= Bowls England National Championships (men's pairs) =

British lawn bowls event

The men's pairs is one of the events at the annual Bowls England National Championships.

== History ==
From 1912 and 1920 the winner received the Sir Thomas Dewar Cup.

== Venues ==
- 1912–1913 (Belmont BC, Streatham)
- 1914, 1926 (Bellingham BC, Bellingham, Catford)
- 1919 (South London & Balham clubs, Balham/Wandsworth)
- 1920 (Great Northern Railway AC, Gordon Hill, London)
- 1921 (Summerhill Gosforth & Portland clubs, Newcastle upon Tyne)
- 1922, 1928, 1935 (Croydon BC, South Croydon)
- 1923 (Wellingborough BC, Wellingborough)
- 1924, 1936, 1938–1939 (Temple Bowling Club, Denmark Hill)
- 1925 (City & Spa clubs, Gloucester)
- 1927 (Preston Park, Brighton)
- 1929 (Victoria Park & Westcote clubs, Leicester)
- 1930–1934, 1937, 1945–1957 (Paddington Recreation Ground)
- 1958–1973 (Watney's Sports Club, Mortlake)
- 1974–2013 (Worthing Bowls Club, Beach House Park)
- 2014–present (Victoria Park, Royal Leamington Spa)

== Sponsors ==
- 1982-1987 (Gateway Building Society)
- 1988-1991 (The Woolwich)
- 1993-1995 (Sanatogen)
- 2001-2001 (Yoplait)
- 2003–2005 (National Express)
- 2006–2006 (Waitrose)
- 2023–2025 (Aviva)

== Past winners ==
Year	County	Champion	Club	County	Runner-up	Club	Score	Ref
1912	Somerset	J. Osmond & S. Clout	Clarence Park	Surrey	Woollacott & Watson	Malden	30–18	
1913	Kent	C. Booth & A. E. Godsall	Forest Hill	Essex	W. T. Darke & F. T. Fisher	Southend-on-Sea	29–16	
1914	Somerset	A.P.Derrick & S.T.Ewens	Bristol	Northumberland	R. B. Charlton & N. C. Barnfather	Hexham-on-Tyne	17–16	
1915–1918 No competition due to war
1919	Bedfordshire	R. Hutchinson & D. B. Dawson	Beech Hill, Luton	Middlesex	A. R. Gordon & E Woodroffe	Met. Special Constabulary, Y Div	27–10	
1920	Somerset	Montagu Cooper & P. E. Hall	Taunton Deane	Middlesex	W. McFarlane & A. Grassick	Crouch Hill	26–16	
1921	Sussex	R. John & T. Harwood	Preston, Brighton	Leicestershire	A. Middleton & W. T. Hart	Abbey Park	28–11	
1922	Durham	J. J. Carr & T. W. Kirtley	Roker Park	Oxfordshire	A. E. Allen & J. G. Darlow	East Oxford	20–14	
1923	Northumberland	Jos. Robinson & James W. Dick	Gosforth	Devon	C. W. Webber & J. Lang	Exeter City	29–13	
1924	Somerset	H. M. Cooper & P. E. Hall	Taunton	Wiltshire	A. E. Harris & R. Uncles	Bradford-on-Avon	21–16	
1925	Leicestershire	A. Ward & A. Middleton	Abbey Park	Hampshire	E.C. Redman & G. F. Crabb	Banister Park	23–20	
1926	Dorset	Bamber & Dewland	Poole Park	Berkshire	L. A. King & Tom Tickle	Park Institute	24–13	
1927	Dorset	Read & Ramsbottom	Poole Park	Kent	W. Jeffrey & C. Walton	Faversham	22–10	
1928	Northamptonshire	W. Pendred & W. J. Mitchell	Wellingborough	Middlesex	W Thomas & F Euscher	Downhills, Tottenham	31–13	
1929	Cumberland	T. Sibson & Dr. Lambert	Carlisle Subscription	Wiltshire	B. S. Case & E. J. Case	Salisbury	30–15	
1930	Somerset	W. F. Wheeler & W. Date	Frome Selwood	Cumberland	H. Graham & J. Turner	Carlisle Subscription	24–12	
1931	Somerset	J. Williams & E. W. Fortune	St. George's	Warwickshire	R. J. Bowden & Rev. J. S. Crole	Tally Ho	29–15	
1932	Northamptonshire	Arthur Bull & George Bull	Wellingborough	Kent	William Jeffrey & Colin Walton	Faversham	25–14	
1933	Kent	Robert Slater & Billy Buckell	Callenders	Hampshire	C.W.Phillips & W.H.Brett	Richmond Park	30–14	
1934	Kent	Robert Slater & Billy Buckell	Callenders	Berkshire	J. F. Thomas & Tom Tickle	Park Institute	21–14	
1935	Yorkshire	Bill Jones & G. Gladders	Saltburn-by-Sea	Kent	H. V. Kay & H. O. Bristow	Blackheath & Greenwich	23–13	
1936	Sussex	J.T.F.Fountain & W.Weekes	White Rock, Hastings	Somerset	R. L. G. Simpson & G. Ellis	Bloomfield, Bath	19–18	
1937	Sussex	Arthur Knowling & Albert Knowling	Worthing	Gloucestershire	J.J. Armer & F.R. Robinson	Bristol St Andrews	27–13	
1938	Sussex	Arthur Knowling & Albert Knowling	Worthing	Yorkshire	R. B. Latheron & E. Raine	Harrogate	22–16	
1939	County Durham	J. Mitchell & R. L. Snowball	Durham City	Northumberland	J. A. Bagley & J. Hall	Summerhill	24–16	
1940–1944 No competition due to war
1945	Kent	G. Douglas & Jack Snelgar	Bellingham	Northamptonshire	W. T. Lawton & Albert Knight	Abington	17–15	
1946	Cornwall	W H Daniel & Maurice Ferris	Penzance	Wiltshire	Cyril Daniel & Reg Cooper	Swindon	24–23	
1947	Worcestershire	Will Lock & Sid Adams	County Ground	Wiltshire	E. E. Jenkins & Ernie Pullin	Chippenham	26–21	
1948	Devon	Harold Shapland & Reg Grater	Tiverton Boro	Yorkshire	Ted Ashton & Albert Allison 'Bert' Keech	Bootham	22–17	
1949	County Durham	Sid Race & Bob Gittins	Darlington R. A.	Buckinghamshire	D. Harvey & G.W. Morton	Marlow	24–20	
1950	Dorset	Percy Baker & Len Piper	Poole Park	Cumberland	Isaac Benson & Joseph Hodgson	Edenside	22–15	
1951	Oxfordshire	Ron Duke & Percy Harvey	South Oxford	Devon	Ben Morgan & Fred Horn	Torquay	19–15	
1952	Devon	Ben Morgan & Fred Horn	Torquay	Northumberland	T. Cook & C. T. Coffer	Collingwood	23–11	
1953	Yorkshire	J. Fowler & T. Mitchell	Bootham	Dorset	Percy Baker & Len Piper	Poole Park	19–15	
1954	County Durham	P. Bell & Wiffles Heath	Dean and Chapter	Wiltshire	G. W. Chapman & W. T. Clements	Trowbridge Town	22–19	
1955	Sussex	Harry Ward & John Scadgell	Worthing	Surrey	Vic Oliver & Harry Gardiner	Croydon	24–14	
1956	County Durham	Harry Watson & Les Watson	Darlington East Park	Wiltshire	Ernie Pullin & Alec Pullin	Chippenham Town	16–14	
1957	Sussex	Gordon Sparkes & Arthur Knowling Jr.	Worthing	Oxfordshire	J.Smart & F.Baldwin	Banbury Borough	22–9	
1958	Surrey	Joe Martin & Arthur Hatto	Mid-Surrey	Nottinghamshire	Stan Morley & Ken Cooper	Lenton Unionists	24–12	
1959	Middlesex	Fred Harris & Jim Brayley	Paddington	Somerset	Roger Harris & David Bryant	Clevedon	19–17	
1960	Buckinghamshire	Charlie Plater & Arthur Philbey	Aylesbury Boro	Somerset	George Brett & Peter Brimble	Bristol	23–12	
1961	Suffolk	Albert Race & Percy Denny	Marlborough	Surrey	Ron Merritt & Reg Norris	Chipstead	17–15	
1962	Dorset	Percy Baker & Harry Shave	Poole Park	Hampshire	George Hooker & Arthur Houghton	Atherley	21–14	
1963	Dorset	Bill Reynolds & Tom Rogers	Greenhill	Cambridgeshire	Horace Lake & Fred Green	March Conservative	22–17	
1964	Worcestershire	Gerald Webb & Peter Coates	M. E. B.	Cumberland	John Dixon & L. Dixon	Penrith Castle Park	19–17	
1965	Somerset	David Rhys-Jones & David Bryant	Clevedon	Sussex	Rex Glover-Phillips & John Scadgell	Worthing	24–21	
1966	Sussex	Rex Glover-Phillips & John Scadgell	Worthing	Kent	Les Rowan & John McMeakin	Sandwich	23–17	
1967	Northamptonshire	Trevor Morgan & John Hope	County Ground	Suffolk	Frank Morris & Vic Woodward	Marlborough	18–15	
1968	Surrey	Alan Barnett & Noel Jackson	Dulwich	Northumberland	Philip Furness & Harry Kinnersley	Morpeth	21–16	
1969	Somerset	David Rhys-Jones & David Bryant MBE	Clevedon	Bedfordshire	Alan Papworth & George Crawley	Arlesey	25–11	
1970	County Durham	Billy Thompson & Tommy Bransby	Pennywell	Lincolnshire	Roy Goom & Alf Beck	Bristol	21–10	
1971	Kent	Denis Cross & Dave Crocker	Livesey Memorial	Warwickshire	Ernest Over & Bert Jacox	Stoke, Coventry	23–17	
1972	Dorset	Ray Dawes & Charles Price	Greenhill	Northumberland	John Comballack & Mike Kirkpatrick	Angus	20–19	
1973	Cumberland	Tommy Armstrong & Ronald Milburn	Penrith Castle Pk	Middlesex	Roger Gibbins & Reginald Paine	L.T.A.S.S.A.	25–15	
1974	Somerset	David Rhys-Jones & David Bryant MBE	Clevedon	Lincolnshire	Bernard Gedney & Fred Smith	Burton House	17–14	
1975	Northumberland	George Davis & John Nelson	North Shields West End	Yorkshire	William Campbell & Peter Inch	Middlesbrough Co-Op	22–14	
1976	Nottinghamshire	Peter Goulding & Jeff Berrington	Plessey	Kent	Maurice Phillips & Frank Sekjer	Thames Poly	16–12	
1977	Worcestershire	Clive Hall & Tony Russell	Brotherhood	Somerset	Paul Branfield & Pip Branfield	Clevedon	21–18	
1978	Northumberland	Stanley Lant & Robert Keenleyside	Angus	Hampshire	Jimmy Hobday & Anthony Gabb	Boscombe Cliff	23–22	
1979	Norfolk	Eddie Bell & Malcolm Wade	Wymondham Dell	Leicestershire	Paul Clarke & Tony Allcock	Belgrave	21–19	
1980	Suffolk	Keith Cady & Roger Denny	Framlingham Castle	Cornwall	Richard Worth & Peter Gilbert	Kensey Vale	24–18	
1981	Lincolnshire	Alan Bates & Richard White	Burton House	Worcestershire	Alec Jackson & Clive Hall	Brotherhood	24–13	
1982	Bedfordshire	David Hirst & John McConnell	Bedford Borough	Northumberland	Alan Mackenzie & Michael McGreevy	Angus	22–12	
1983	County Durham	George Turley & Mal Hughes	Eldon Grove	Yorkshire	Keith Parker & Mick Parker	Scarcroft	17–16	
1984	Kent	Ollie Jones & Len Haynes	Lenham	Buckinghamshire	Jim Higgs & Geoff Springell	Marlow	17–15	
1985	Yorkshire	Peter Richardson & Frank Maxwell	Haxby Road	County Durham	Ken Briscoe & Keith Renwick	Hylton Colliery	16–15	
1986	County Durham	David Kilner & Cliff Simpson	Owton Lodge	Norfolk	Brian Taylor & Gary Blake	County Arts	26–10	
1987	Lancashire	David Holt & Thomas Armstrong	Bolton	Middlesex	Dave Rowlands & Ken Morrison	Uxbridge	23–21	
1988	Leicestershire	John Stephenson & Paul Clarke	Belgrave	Nottinghamshire	Brett Morley & Peter Goulding	Plessey	17–14	
1989	Essex	David McCathie & Paul Maynard	Essex County	Lancashire	Mike Leach & Charles Tattersall	Newton Hall	25–16	
1990	Norfolk	John Ottaway & Roger Guy	Wymondham Dell	Middlesex	Colin Harman & Paul Cater	West Ealing	19–15	
1991	Cumbria	Ronald Gass & John Bell	Wigton	Middlesex	Jim Marsh & Dave Hall	N.P.L.	29–16	
1992	Kent	Gary Smith & Andy Thomson	Blackheath & Greenwich	Sussex	John Durrant & Richard Moses	Hollingbury Park	24–17	
1993	Warwickshire	Rob Robinson & Richard Brittan	Erdington Court	Kent	Gary Smith & Andy Thomson	Blackheath & Greewich	25–24	
1994	Northumberland	Keith Wood & Michael Bennett	Ponteland	County Durham	Alan Theobald & Dave Webb	Gateshead	26–6	
1995	Wiltshire	Mel Biggs & Steve Warren	Westlecot	Essex	J. Donnelly & Roy Farrant	Loxford Park	21–20	
1996	Worcestershire	Ian Maddox & Robert Stanley	Bank House Hotel	Gloucestershire	Andrew Wills & Tony Allcock MBE	Cheltenham	20–19	
1997	Dorset	Shaun Nutman & Adam Tidby	Dorchester	Northumberland	Bryan Taylor & Anthony Kempster	Gosforth	19–14	
1998	Warwickshire	Kenneth Ashby & Graham Ashby	Stoke, Coventry	Lincolnshire	Kim Keilty & Daniel Brown	St Giles, Lincoln	24–12	
1999	Northamptonshire	Barry Fokerd & Paul Broderick	Wellingborough	Kent	Michael Arnold & Gordon Charlton	Sandwich	24–23	
2000	Cumbria	Paul Barlow & Stephen Farish	Wigton	Suffolk	John Rednall & Clive Webb	Felixstowe & Suffolk	24–14	
2001	Cambridgeshire	Maurice Miller & Tony Merrell	March Conservative	Surrey	Ray Otley & Mark Overington	Cranleigh R.B.L.	18–17	
2002	Buckinghamshire	Peter Picknell & Keith Hawes	Iver Heath	Worcestershire	Mark Stones & Grant Burgess	Gilt Edge	17–13	
2003	Suffolk	John Rednall & Clive Webb	Felixstowe & Suffolk	Worcestershire	Simon Jones & Mark Atkins	Worcester	20–10	
2004	Norfolk	Ian Wynter & Jamie Chestney	Downham Ex-Service	Bedfordshire	Rhys Lee & Luke Nunn	Barton-le-Clay	19–16	
2005	Warwickshire	Simon Gilbert & Andrew Smith	Avenue, L Spa	Yorkshire	Scott Burrell & Mark Walton	Nafferton	24–9	
2006	Oxfordshire	Greg Moon & Gary Lucas	Banbury Borough	Dorset	Dave Smith & Neil Burroughs	Greenhill	17–16	
2007	Kent	Colin Goldsmith & Gordon Charlton	Sandwich	Buckinghamshire	Eric Smith & Peter McGuinness	Gerrards Cross	22–21	
2008	Suffolk	Andy Meikle & Adrian Holden	Felixstowe & Suffolk	Cumbria	John Baird & Rick Gallagher	Carlisle Subscription	20–10	
2009	Dorset	Martin Pavey & Jamie Lockwood	Dorchester	Surrey	Michael O'Leary & Jeff O'Leary	Epsom Park	24–11	
2010	Huntingdonshire	Wayne Bailey & Tristan Morton	White Hart	Lancashire	Chris Gale & Jason Parkinson	(Manchester Commonwealth	22–19	
2011	Worcestershire	Dean Hemming & Robert Stanley	Worcester	Nottinghamshire	Duncan Robinson & Brett Morley	Trent Vale	23–11	
2012	Bedfordshire	Rhys Lee & Luke Nunn	Barton-le-Clay	Berkshire	Adrian Chipper & Chris Holliday	Wokingham	19–18	
2013	Essex	Lloyd Sabatini & Edward Morris	Essex County	Northumberland	Steve Pallas & Chris Yeomans	Gosforth	21–16	
2014	Warwickshire	Craig Carter & Tom Millership	Rugby	Lincolnshire	Nick Orrey & Mathew Orrey	Grantham	22–4	
2015	Somerset	Peter Shaw & James Amery	Taunton	Buckinghamshire	Malcolm Drage & Dean Brookes	Bletchley Town	20–16	
2016	Devon	Sam Tolchard & Louis Ridout	Kings Torquay	Herefordshire	Mike Ricketts & Dan Holmes	Ledbury	20–13	
2017	Lincolnshire	Steve Hill & Martin Spencer	Royal Mail Cart	Cumbria	John Baird & Rick Gallagher	Carlisle Subscription	20–19	
2018	Somerset	Neil Williams & Sam Steel	Watchet	Surrey	Mark Dunne & Mark Jones	West End	19–12	
2019	Kent	Jason Haskins & Roger Kendrick	VCD	Isle of Wight	Darren Griffith & Jack Berry	Shanklin	18–8	
2020 No competition due to COVID-19 pandemic								
2021	Norfolk	John Tufts & Wayne Willgress	Norfolk BC	Devon	Sam Tolchard & Louis Ridout	Kings, Torquay	15–6	
2022	Huntingdonshire	Lewis Baker & Nick Brett	Brampton BC	Buckinghamshire	Matt Hyde & Andrew Briden	Gerrards Cross	20–9	
2023	Leicestershire	Nick Wardle & Joe Dawson	Kingscroft	Essex	Steve Gunnell & Edward Morris	Essex County	16–15	
2024	Hunts	Ean Morton & Tristan Morton	Parkway	Warwicks	Dan Box & Andrew Walters	Welford-On-Avon	23–9	
2025	Devon	James Hampton & Sam Tolchard	Kings	Essex	Steve Gunnell & Edward Morris	Essex County	15–11	
2026	Wilts	Kyle Anderson & Scott Edwards	Royal Wootton Bassett	Lincs	Gary Morris & Mathew Whyers	Burton House	25–11	
