= Bowls England National Championships (men's triples) =

British lawn bowls event

The Bowls England National Championships (Men's Triples) is one of the events at the annual Bowls England National Championships.

== Venues ==
- 1945–1957 (Paddington Recreation Ground)
- 1958–1973 (Watney's Sports Club, Mortlake)
- 1974–2013 (Worthing Bowls Club, Beach House Park)
- 2014–present (Victoria Park, Royal Leamington Spa)

== Sponsors ==
- 1982-1987 (Gateway Building Society)
- 1988-1991 (The Woolwich)
- 1993-1995 (Sanatogen)
- 2001-2001 (Yoplait)
- 2003–2005 (National Express)
- 2006–2006 (Waitrose)
- 2023–2025 (Aviva)

== Past winners ==
Year	County	Champion	Club	County	Runner-up	Club	Score	Ref
1945	Cornwall	Leslie Pascoe, Tom McCulloch, Maurice Ferris	Penzance	Middlesex	J.G Peart, H. Anderson, Andy Wilson	Parsons Green	20-10	
1946	Yorkshire	Bill Jones, T. Fennell, Arthur Gladders	Saltburn	Surrey	E Bowditch, A. Brown, W. J. Weare	Magdalen Park	19-9	
1947	Surrey	S. A. Vallance, C. H. Godwin, Charles Walder	Redhill	Sussex	Arthur Knowling, Albert Knowling, Fred Sparks	Worthing	20-19	
1948	[Kent	B. Bassant, Sidney Filmer, Colin Walton	Faversham	Devon	L Parkinson, Harold Webber, N Willington	Torbay Country Club	14-11	
1949	Sussex	Percy Brazier, Harry Skingley, Henry Mann	Worthing Pavilion	Warwickshire	H. Butterill, Frank M. Edge, Howard E. Beard	Three Spires, Coventry	16-8	
1950	Herefordshire	Joe Mee, Dick Beaven, Billy Edwards	Hereford	Northamptonshire	H. Wills, F. Tye, G. Fox	Rushden Town	21-11	
1951	Oxfordshire	E. F. Bowtell, H. C. Halliday, B. L. Rogers	North Oxford	Middlesex	W. Hooper, C. A. Birtles, F. Rogers	Century	21-13	
1952	Berkshire	W. J. Stone, L. G. Stone, F. H Thomas	Reading	County Durham	R. H. Stokeld, T. D. Brown, L. Whitworth	New Herrington	20-13	
1953	County Durham	S. R. Bates, W. R. Vickerton, S. J. Bates	Darlington Woodland	Northamptonshire	Frank Purser, Albert Knight, C. J. Knight	Abington	19-11	
1954	Suffolk	N.Richards, P.Richards, E Dodge	Rookery	Devon	J. P. Copp, R. G. Grater, Harold Shapland	Tiverton Borough	23-9	
1955	Hampshire	J. Jones, E. Maindonald, R. Taylor	Southbourne	Worcestershire	R. A. Fry, E. Perritt, G. Grove	Evesham	23-12	
1956	Warwickshire	H. Bryan, G. Higginson, Arthur H. Meredith	Avenue, Leamington Spa	Wiltshire	Walter Barnett, Bill Winchcombe, Granville Poppitt	Swindon North End	22-18	
1957	Lincolnshire	C.Bass, D.Else, H Campbell	Redbourn	Middlesex	I.Walters, E.Brandon, J Stewart	Crouch Hill	29-15	
1958	Lancashire	C. Garside, W. Mailin, J. Cragg	Blackpool	Hertfordshire	W. McWhirr, A. W. Barker, G.Frost	Townsend, St. Albans	17-10	
1959	Hertfordshire	F.I.Smith, G.W.Scott	Hatfield	Hampshire	E. S. Hayes, H. Lewry, Peter Line	Banister Park	26-10	
1960	Dorset	Percy Baker, Ernie Milnthorpe, Harry Shave	Poole Park	Cumberland	J. Kelly, J. Dominey, J. Hodgson	Edenside	13-12	
1961	Gloucestershire	H.Sadler, F.Price, G.Ham	Stroud	Lincolnshire	P.Blythin, G.Robinson, S.Batchelor	Grimsby New Clee	17-15	
1962	Warwickshire	Thomas R. Whittaker, Gilbert Fuller, Victor Amphlett	Leamington Spa	Middlesex	E. Sussex, W. Simpson, J. Holliday	West Ealing	19-12	
1963	Middlesex	W. J. Thomas, Maurice Ellicott, Jim Girdwood	Paddington	Suffolk	J. Clarke, J. Strang, H.G. Stammers	Rookery	20-14	
1964	Kent	W. Stevenson, J. Drummond, C. V. Sweeting	Forest Hill	Northamptonshire	Stan Carter, Ray Brook, Bobby Stenhouse	Wellingborough Town	17-16	
1965	Northamptonshire	Ernest Willson, Les Coker, Mick Cooper	Kettering Lodge	Surrey	A.Owen, T.G.Howard, A.Martin	Dulwich	21-10	
1966	Somerset	William Elliott, David Rhys Jones, David Bryant	Clevedon	Hampshire	E.Websell, A Ashworth, Harold Powell	British Legion, Farnborough	22-12	
1967	Northumberland	Arnold Bryson, George Boag, Fred Lumley	Summerhill	Isle of Wight	S. Vidler, Cecil Baker, S. G. Wade	Ryde	18-15	
1968	Northamptonshire	Harold Sturgess, Jack Forster, Ron Crawley	Wellingborough Town	Surrey	R. Greenway, J. Slater, Fred Mortimore	Esher	20-18	
1969	Northamptonshire	Eric Randell, George Wills, Mick Cooper	Rushden Town	Kent	J. Armstrong, Les Rowan, John McMeakin	Sandwich	18-15	
1970	Bedfordshire	R. Wicks, Dick Meyrick, W. Mead	Luton, George Kent	Nottinghamshire	R. Smedley, J. Smedley, George Smedley	Yeoman Hill Park	25-11	
1971	Buckinghamshire	John Lewis, Ian Harvey, Arthur Plested	Marlow	Oxfordshire	J. Hazlewood, B. Boscot, Fred Beer	Banbury Chestnuts	16-15	
1972	Cornwall	David Cutler, Chris Yelland, Bill Olver	St. Austell	Yorkshire	T. W. Roberts, E. Fennell, Gill Gillis	Hull Road Park	16-14	
1973	Northumberland	George Watson, Tom Wilkinson, Ronald Bolton	Swan Hunter and W. R. Ltd	County Durham	R. Irwin, A. Ridley, W. C. Watson	Herrington Workmens	14-13	
1974	Warwickshire	John Barratt, Ralph Shakespeare, Ronald Gildert	English Electric	Norfolk	Brian Taylor, Frank Hart, Peter Paul	County Arts	19-16	
1975	Hampshire	G. Kirby, W. Stewart, Harold Powell	British Legion, Farnborough	Cambridgeshire	David Cornwell, John Campton	City of Ely	23-15	
1976	Cumbria	Ron Baxter, Joe Baxter, John Bell	Wigton	Norfolk	Ted Browne, Arthur Waters, Sidney Wisdom	Wymondham Dell	18-11	
1977	Somerset	John Knight, David Rhys Jones, David Bryant MBE	Clevedon	Devon	Eric Fricker, Brian Lee, Norman Chalk	Torbay C.C.	22-13	
1978	Nottinghamshire	William Thompson, Dave Thompson, Geoffrey Mee	Rainworth Miners Welfare	Essex	Roy Howard, Alan McElrea, Ernest Edwards	Crittall Silver End	23-16	
1979	Somerset	Roy Hedges, Frankie Brown, Peter Brimble	Bristol	Somerset	S. Pitman, D. Avery, J. Sleeman	Victoria, Weston-Super-Mare	25-20	
1980	Lancashire	Charles Pilkington, Tony Horobin, Gordon Niven	Heaton Hall	Hampshire	Graham Standley, Norman Shelley, Peter Line	Banister Park	20-12	
1981	Huntingdonshire	George Heathcote, Mick Durber, David Howells	St. Peters	Yorkshire	Melvin West, George Cuthbertson, Gordon Stevenson	Y.P.I. Hull	22-9	
1982	Kent	Bob Stewart, Oliver Jones, Len Haynes	Lenham	Northamptonshire	John Clipston, Eric Thomason, Ernie Tredwell	Kingsthorpe	25-11	
1983	Suffolk	John Barell, Graham Cutts, Roy Cutts	Marlborough	Suffolk	Keith Caddy, Roger Denny, Ken Freeman	Framlingham Castle	19-18	
1984	Somerset	Gordon James, Len Branfield, Pip Branfield	Clevedon	Northamptonshire	Chris Bussey, Rab Donoghue, Tony Holmes	Kettering Lodge	15-12	
1985	Somerset	Kenneth Frost, David Rhys Jones, David Bryant CBE	Clevedon	Cumbria	Ron Baxter, Ronald Gass, John Bell	Wigton	20-11	
1986	Dorset	Adam Tidby, Barry Stone, Chris Martin	Poole Park	Kent	Martin Wilde, Geoff Chapman, Martyn Sekjer	Maidstone	19-6	
1987	Worcestershire	Mark Weaver, John Weaver, Grant Burgess	Worcester County Ground	Gloucestershire	Paul Glastonbury, Martin Brown, Nigel Dolphin	Stroud	24-10	
1988	Leicestershire	Dave Sheppard, John Stephenson, Paul Clarke	Belgrave	Somerset	Ron Tuggey, Dave Bessant, Pip Branfield	Clevedon	17-11	
1989	Sussex	Paul Butler, Colin Knight, Andrew Jordan	Southbourne	Wiltshire	Ken Norman, Arthur Jackson, Hedley Bowen	Swindon	20-18	
1990	Gloucestershire	Andrew Wills, Jack Drummond-Henderson, Tony Allcock	Cheltenham	Warwickshire	Michael Hawkins, David Bennett, Simon Davies	Welford on Avon	18-16	
1991	Cumbria	Paul Barlow, Andrew Baxter, John Bell	Wigton	Oxfordshire	Ian Henwood, Mark Peachy, Robert Mackie	Summertown	16-15	
1992	Buckinghamshire	Maurice Cracknell, Ray Gaskins, Ted Hanger	Chandos Park	Dorset	Bob Powell, Mark Tomberry Adam Tidby	Poole Park	19-3	
1993	Sussex	Paul Lewis, Mark Ireland, David Williams<	Preston, Brighton	Suffolk	Ashley Sale, John Barrell, Roy Cutts	Marlborough	21-20	
1994	Devon	Ted Collins, John C. Evans, Danny Denison	Torquay	Berkshire	Graham Waldron, Robert Newman, Michael Newman	Reading B.C	15-12	
1995	Gloucestershire	Andrew Wills, Simon Jones, Tony Allcock	Cheltenham	Cumbria	Richard Sampson, Trevor Taylor, David Taylor	Courtfield	16-14	
1996	Somerset	Barrie Smith, Mike Davies, Don Fowkes	British Cellophane	Isle of Wight	Chris New, Peter Furmidge, Peter Dunstan	Cowes Medina	21-17	
1997	Cumbria	Paul Barlow, Andrew Baxter, Steven Farish	Wigton	Lincolnshire	Billy Jackson, Kim Kielty, Danny Brown	St. Giles, Lincoln	15-13	
1998	Lancashire	Tony King, Barry Kitson, David Colbourne	Bolton	Kent	Clive Miles, Mike Arnold, Gordon Charlton	Sandwich	23-17	
1999	Hampshire	Dean Morgan, Russell Morgan, Julian Haines	Boscombe Cliff	Warwickshire	Kenneth Ashby, Colin Jacox, Graham Ashby	Stoke, Coventry	19-11	
2000	Northumberland	Paul Ging, Stephen Birdsey, Stanley Lant	Northern Electric	Hampshire	Matthew Marchant, Charlie Bailey, Dorian Bishop	Civil Service Portsmouth	15-12	
2001	Nottinghamshire	Nick Cammack, Duncan Robinson, Brett Morley	Siemens	Kent	Matt Lonie, Dave Clark, Chris Taylor	Folkestone Park	21-11	
2002	Oxfordshire	Gary Lucas, Alan Prew, Greg Moon	Banbury Borough	Nottinghamshire	Michael Bowley, David Baird, Phil Dickens	Cavaliers	23-17	
2003	Berkshire	Bernard Greenough, Robert Newman, Michael Newman	Reading	Suffolk	George Ward, Duncan Snape, Brian Andrews	Melton	15-13	
2004	Yorkshire	Stephen Dilks, Christopher Kelly, Mark Walton	Nafferton	Berkshire	Gordon Knapper, Andrew Knapper, Bill Hing	Desborough	29-6	
2005	Wiltshire	Mel Biggs, Neil Hope, Mark Dyer	Westlecot	Cornwall	Ian Powell, Mark Read, Richard Bray	Stenalees	19-16	
2006	Leicestershire	John Torrington, Steven Wade, Andrew Irons	Blaby	Oxfordshire	Greg Moon, Alan Prew, Gary Lucas	Banbury Borough	19- 5	
2007	Norfolk	Charles West, Chris Willgress, Wayne Willgress	Norfolk	Leicestershire	Matthew Bass, Christoper Rogers, Neil Hope	Holwell Sports	16-14	
2008	Northamptonshire	Richard Mann, Roger Tansley, Vernon Geary	Kingsthorpe	Essex	Lee Chaplin, Kevin Maguire, John Tully	Elm Park	14-12	
2009	Cambridgeshire	Jamie Stewart, Rob Drew, Richard Catton	Cambridge & County	Devon	Dave Veal, Glenn Allen, Robert Paxton	Exonia	17-14	
2010	Suffolk	Mark Todd, John Catchpole, Ian Catchpole	Halesworth Angel	Devon	Tony Coombes, Michael Coombes, Terry Evans	Bitton Park	19- 9	
2011	Devon	Darren James, Neil Popham, Steve Bonetta	Bideford	Bedfordshire	Rhys Lee, Steven Mead, Luke Nunn	Barton-le-Clay	17-15	
2012	Sussex	Glen Newton, Nick Wingfield, Shaun Godfrey	White Rock	Wiltshire	James Nobbs, Neil Smith, Gary Morphet	Wootton Bassett	25-10	
2013	Berkshire	Dan Weatherly-Emberson, Adrian Collins & Andrew Knapper	Tilehurst	Gloucestershire	Nick Holliday, Mark Perry, Stuart Hodges	Cheltenham	19-12	
2014	Wiltshire	Andrew Colebrooke, Russell Francis & Graham Shadwell	Spencer Moulton	Oxfordshire	David Clanfield, Paul Sharman & Alan Prew	Carterton	15-14	
2015	Huntingdonshire	James Harford, Simon Law & Stuart Popple	Parkway	Leicestershire	Ken Frost, Roger Cooper & Shane Hayes	Leicester	16-10	
2016	Devon	Ian Lesley, James Webber & Ollie Lucas	Shaldon	Middlesex	Paul Reynolds, Chris Harris & Tony Waller	Ladygate	15–14	
2017	Huntingdonshire	Ean Morton, Mike Robertson & Tristan Morton	Parkway	Devon	Louis Ridout, Sam Tolchard & Jamie Chestney	Kings Torquay	15–14	
2018	Lancashire	David Lockhart, Ian Mayne & Chris Gale	Heaton Hall	Devon	Louis Ridout, Sam Tolchard & Jamie Chestney	Kings Torquay	18–12	
2019	Berkshire	Scott Winskill, Mark Hancock & Andrew Knapper	Tilehurst	Cumbria	Kevin Harrison, Mark Irwin & Stuart Irwin	Aspatria	16–13	
No competition due to COVID-19 pandemic								
2021	Essex	Christopher Muir, Steve Gunnell & Edward Morris	Essex County	Devon	Lee Phillips, James Hampton & Kevin Phillips	Topsham	18–11	
2022	Cumbria	Kevin Harrison, Mark Irwin & Stuart Irwin	Aspatria	Derbyshire	Josh Grant, Dan Thornhill & Phil Broughton	Stute	14–10	
2023	Bucks	Michael Gomme, Matthew Hyde & Andrew Briden	Gerrards Cross	Essex	Simon Kittle, Steve Gunnell & Ed Morris	Essex County	15–14	
2024	Derbys	Josh Grant, Dan Thornhill & Philip Broughton	Stute	Lancs	Robert Stirling, Anthony Booth-Young & Lloyd Milligan	Heaton Hall	19–14	
2025	Devon	Simon Broom, Jamie Chestney & Jamie Walker	Culm Vale	Northumb	Josh Minto, BJ Byles & Chris Yeomans	Gosforth	15–14	
2026	Cornwall	Adam Brooks, Tim Phillips, Mark Foster	Carnon Downs	Berks	David Murray, Jake Webster, Mikey Titcombe	Shrivenham	20–9	
