= Bowls England National Championships (men's singles four wood) =

British lawn bowls event

The men's singles four wood is one of the events at the annual Bowls England National Championships.

The four-wood singles is the traditional variation of the game; see Glossary of bowls terms.

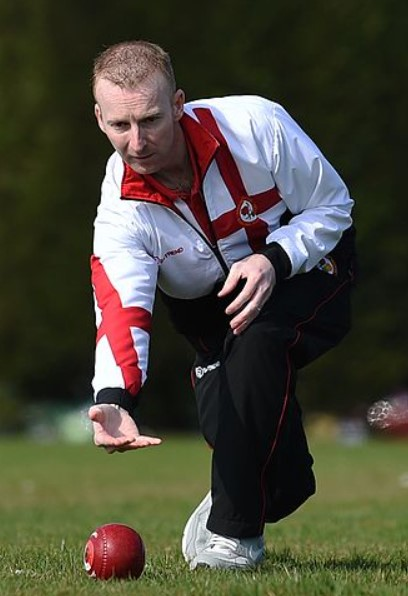
Nick Brett 1999 champion

== History ==
The singles event was originally contested to win the Sir Thomas Brook Hitchen gold medal and then from 1913 and 1920 it was called the Sir Thomas Lipton Cup.

The 1908 final was started at the Upper Clapton greens but was suspended with Knight leading 14–7 following the death of the skip during the fours event. The final resumed at the Streatham Constitutional Club the following day.

== Venues ==
- 1905–1907, 1910 (Upper Clapton BC, Clapton, London)
- 1908 (Streatham Constitutional Club, Streatham)
- 1909 (Leicester BC, Leicester}
- 1911 (Forest Hill BC, Forest Hill, London)
- 1912–1913 (Belmont BC, Streatham)
- 1914, 1926 (Bellingham BC, Bellingham, Catford)
- 1919 (South London & Balham clubs, Balham/Wandsworth)
- 1920 (Great Northern Railway AC, Gordon Hill, London)
- 1921 (Summerhill Gosforth & Portland clubs, Newcastle upon Tyne)
- 1922, 1928, 1935 (Croydon BC, South Croydon)
- 1923 (Wellingborough BC, Wellingborough)
- 1924, 1936, 1938–1939 (Temple Bowling Club, Denmark Hill)
- 1925 (City & Spa clubs, Gloucester)
- 1927 (Preston Park, Brighton)
- 1929 (Victoria Park & Westcote clubs, Leicester)
- 1930–1934, 1937, 1945–1957 (Paddington Recreation Ground)
- 1958–1973 (Watney's Sports Club, Mortlake)
- 1974–2013 (Worthing Bowls Club, Beach House Park)
- 2014–present (Victoria Park, Royal Leamington Spa)

== Sponsors ==
- 1982–1987 (Gateway Building Society)
- 1988–1991 (The Woolwich)
- 1993–1995 (Sanatogen)
- 2001-2001 (Yoplait)
- 2003–2005 (National Express)
- 2006 (Waitrose)
- 2023–2025 (Aviva)

== Past winners ==
Year	County	Champion	Club	County	Runner-up	Club	Score	Ref
1905	Middlesex	James Carruthers	Muswell Hill	Northumberland	James Telford	Newcastle, West End	21–1	
1906	County Durham	C. L. Cummings	Sunderland	Middlesex	A. W. Taylor	Finsbury Park	21–8	
1907	Cumberland	James Emmerson	Edenside, Carlisle	Leicestershire	H. W. Gibson	Leicester	21–12	
1908	Surrey	R. Knight	Loughborough Junction	Cumberland	M. Turner	Carlisle Subscription	21–9	
1909	Northumberland	James W. Dick	Gosforth	Berkshire	Harry Childs	Reading	21–10	
1910	Northamptonshire	Frank Shatford	Conservative Kettering	Somerset	J. Dauncy	Victoria Weston-super-Mare	21–10	
1911	Cumberland	John Postlethwaite	Carlisle Courtfield	Kent	James Work	Tunbridge Wells Grove	21–14	
1912	Middlesex	W. J. Jones	Crouch Hill	Cumberland	G. E. Edmondson	Holme Head, Carlisle	23–12	
1913	County Durham	Charles Gibb	Sunderland Ashbrooke	Middlesex	James Carruthers	Muswell Hill	21–9	
1914	Surrey	Douglas Irvine Watson	Maldon	Surrey	W. Dean	Balham	21–15	
1915–1918 No competition due to war
1919	Kent	Ernie Moore	Bellingham	Hampshire	E. Dean	Richmond Park, Bournemouth	21–16	
1920	Kent	A. E. Godsall	Forest Hill	Northumberland	Willie Hamilton	Summerhill, Newcastle	21–14	
1921	Surrey	A. F. Warner	Belmont	Sussex	J. Harwood	Preston, Brighton	21–3	
1922	Northumberland	Willie Hamilton	Hexham	Devon	C. G. Roach	Plymouth Hoe	21–16	
1923	Leicestershire	William Wade	Hinckley	Buckinghamshire	G. Sainsbury	Wendover & Chiltern Hills	21–15	
1924	Devon	Frederick Hodge	Torrington	Hampshire	Edward Redman	Banister Park	21–18	
1925	Devon	Harold Webber	Plymouth	Somerset	William Jennings	Taunton Deane	21–15	
1926	Devon	Robert Jack	Sir Francis Drake, Plymouth	Kent	Alfred Poingdestre	Bromley	21–16	
1927	Berkshire	Tom Tickle	Park Institute, Reading	Hampshire	Edward Redman	Banister Park	21–17	
1928	Hampshire	George Wright	Southern Railway, Eastleigh	Kent	Bill Barlow	Bellingham	21–14	
1929	Kent	Robert Colquhoun	Bromley	Sussex	Ernie Gudgeon	Preston, Brighton	21–20	
1930	Leicestershire	William Wade	Hinckley	Devon	Harold Webber	Plymouth	21–10	
1931	Isle of Wight	Edwin Topp	Ryde	Gloucestershire	Henry Duggan	Gloucester	21–8	
1932	Dorset	Percy Baker	Poole Park	Somerset	Ernie Fortune	St George's, Bristol	21–14	
1933	Middlesex	James McKinlay	Paddington	Isle of Wight	Percy Guy	Shanklin	21–18	
1934	Hampshire	Archibald Cochrane	Southampton	County Durham	Matthew Burdon	Dunelm	21–7	
1935	Yorkshire	Billy Linton	Smith's Docks	Isle of Wight	Jack Gallagher	Cowes	21–15	
1936	Buckinghamshire	Dick Goodson	Chesham	Sussex	Arthur Knowling Jr.	Worthing	21–16	
1937	Yorkshire	William Prentice	Redcar, Zetland	Devon	Harold Webber	Torbay C. Club	21–14	
1938	Hampshire	Keith Cross	Cosham	Northumberland	Harry Cook	Tynemouth	21–15	
1939	Northumberland	Jack Laws	Summerhill	Oxfordshire	Algernon Allen	City & County Club, Oxford	21–8	
1940–1944 No competition due to war
1945	Yorkshire	Albert Allison 'Bert' Keech	Bootham	Gloucestershire	Robbie Robison	Henleaze	21–19	
1946	Dorset	Percy Baker	Poole Park	Berkshire	Ernest Newton	Windsor & Eton	21–20	
1947	Sussex	Peter Mercer	Worthing	Northumberland	Jimmy Thompson	North Shields	21–14	
1948	Berkshire	Ernie Newton	Windsor & Eton	Gloucestershire	Ernie Fortune	Bristol Greenbank	21–9	
1949	Oxfordshire	Algernon Allen	Oxford City & County	Middlesex	Arthur Collins	West Ealing	21–8	
1950	Northumberland	Jimmy Thompson	North Shields, West End	County Durham	Lloyd Whitworth	New Herrington	21–15	
1951	Hertfordshire	Alfred Pikesley	St. Albans	Bedfordshire	Stanley Jackson	Luton Town	21–17	
1952	Dorset	Percy Baker	Poole Park	Oxfordshire	Algernon Allen	Oxford City & County	21–20	
1953	Essex	Richard Cramp	Clay Hall	Warwickshire	Frank Watts	Rugby	21–12	
1954	Northumberland	John Griffiths	Wallsend Borough	Gloucestershire	George Ham	Stroud	21–14	
1955	Dorset	Percy Baker	Poole Park	Yorkshire	Jack Fletcher	York Co-op	21–13	
1956	Berkshire	Norman Butler	Windsor & Eton	Devon	Charlie Webber	Rock Park, Barnstaple	21–16	
1957	Middlesex	Norman King	Parliament Hill	Hertfordshire	Frank Smith	Hatfield	21–4	
1958	Hampshire	Harry Powell	Farnborough British Legion	Isle of Wight	Frank Crockford	Bembridge	21–10	
1959	Surrey	Kenneth Coulson	Croydon	Yorkshire	Tom Fleming	Middlesbrough, Albert Park	21–11	
1960	Somerset	David Bryant	Clevedon	Yorkshire	Tom Fleming	Middlesbrough, Albert Park	21–11	
1961	Hampshire	Peter Line	Banister Park	Lincolnshire	Ernie Hopcroft	Ruston Bucyrus	21–9	
1962	Dorset	Charles Mercer	Lyme Regis	Surrey	Ernie Lake	Old Coulsdon	21–20	
1963	Cumberland	Charlie Graham	Edenside, Carlisle	Hertfordshire	Harry Haynes	Welwyn Garden City	21–20	
1964	Hampshire	Peter Line	Banister Park	Sussex	John Scadgell	Worthing	21–19	
1965	Sussex	Ralph Lewis	Preston, Brighton	Dorset	Percy Baker	Poole Park	21–16	
1966	Somerset	David Bryant	Clevedon	Northumberland	Harry Kinnersley	Morpeth	21–17	
1967	Worcestershire	Bill Irish	Droitwich, Vines Park	Devon	Fred Horn	Torquay	21–12	
1968	Essex	Norman Groves	Witham	Hampshire	Walter Phillips	Boscombe Cliff	21–15	
1969	Hampshire	Jimmy Davidson	Boscombe Cliff	Dorset	Jim Burns	Greenhill	21–10	
1970	Northumberland	Harry Kershaw	Heaton Victoria	Somerset	Sandy Sandall	St. Andrews	21–12	
1971	Somerset	David Bryant MBE	Clevedon	Cornwall	John Blewett	Penlee	21–18	
1972	Somerset	David Bryant MBE	Clevedon	Yorkshire	Bob Robertson	Middlesbrough Co-op	21–16	
1973	Somerset	David Bryant MBE	Clevedon	Buckinghamshire	Ian Harvey	Marlow	21–12	
1974	Worcestershire	Bill Irish	Droitwich, Vines Park	Northumberland	Tom Wilkinson	Swan Hunter	21–10	
1975	Somerset	David Bryant MBE	Clevedon	Middlesex	Robert Gibbins	L.T.A.S.S.A.	22-15	
1976	Surrey	Tony O'Connell	Wimbledon Durnsford	Lincolnshire	Bill Hobart	Boston Sleaford Road	21–17	
1977	Norfolk	Chris Ward	Cromer	Buckinghamshire	David Goldring	Woburn Sands	21–9	
1978	Somerset	Charlie Burch	Taunton	Somerset	David Bryant MBE	Clevedon	22-11	
1979	Cornwall	David Cutler	St. Austell	Suffolk	Chris Southgate	Risbygate	21–14	
1980	County Durham	Tom Buller	View Lane Park	Dorset	Lou Trim	West Moors Memorial	21–18	
1981	Kent	Andy Thomson	Blackheath & Greenwich	Surrey	Alan Windsor	Woking Park	21–20	
1982	Norfolk	Chris Ward	Cromer	Buckinghamshire	Bret Long	Slough	21–10	
1983	Cumbria	John Bell	Wigton)	Northumberland	Kevin Bone	Gosforth	21–13	
1984	Surrey	Wynne Richards	Mid Surrey	Leicestershire	John Kilyon	Loughborough	21–15	
1985	Devon	Ron Keating	Plymouth Civil Service	Cumbria	Ron Gass	Wigton	21–8	
1986	Surrey	Wynne Richards	Mid Surrey	Cumbria	David Taylor	British Rail	21–18	
1987	Lancashire	David Holt	Bolton	Gloucestershire	Tony Allcock	Cheltenham	21–5	
1988	Cornwall	Richard Bray	Stenalees	Somerset	Ian Middlemast	Bath	21–12	
1989	Norfolk	John Ottaway	Wymondham Dell	Isle of Wight	Barry Croad	Ventnor	25-13	
1990	Gloucestershire	Tony Allcock MBE	Cheltenham	Buckinghamshire	Kirk Smith	Denham	25-12	
1991	Gloucestershire	Tony Allcock MBE	Cheltenham	Warwickshire	David Hobbis	Stratford upon Avon	21–3	
1992	Cumbria	Stephen Farish	Wigton	Yorkshire	Hugh Duff	West Park, Hull	21–18	
1993	Devon	John Wickham	Totnes	Kent	Gordon Charlton	Folkestone Park	21–17	
1994	Nottinghamshire	Brett Morley	G.P.T.	Derbyshire	Paul Wilkinson	Long Eaton Town	21–14	
1995	County Durham	John Leeman	Craghead	Gloucestershire	Les Gillett	Cheltenham	21–13	
1996	Norfolk	John Ottaway	Wymondham Dell	County Durham	Andrew Kirtland	Hundens Park	21–18	
1997	Warwickshire	Richard Brittan	Erdington Court	Hertfordshire	Martyn Coles	Garston	21–17	
1998	Worcestershire	Grant Burgess	Gilt Edge	Oxfordshire	Les Gillett	Banbury Borough	21–20	
1999	Huntingdonshire	Nick Brett	White Hart	Warwickshire	Graham Ashby	Stoke, Coventry	21–20	
2000	Norfolk	John Ottaway	Wymondham Dell	Buckinghamshire	Andrew Wise	Marlow	21–9	
2001	Kent	Gordon Charlton	Sandwich	Warwickshire	Mark Clarke	Kings Heath	21–18	
2002	Hampshire	Martyn Sekjer	Southampton SC	Hertfordshire	Andrew Briden	Herts BC	21–2	
2003	Yorkshire	Paul Allenby	Riverview	Yorkshire	Mark Walton	Nafferton	21–13	
2004	Yorkshire	Mark Walton	Nafferton	Essex	Joe Stamper	Lionmede	21–17	
2005	Middlesex	Simon Jee	Parsons Green	Nottinghamshire	Nick Cammack	Trent Vale	21–11	
2006	Yorkshire	Mark Walton	Nafferton	Gloucestershire	Lee Williamson	Barnwood	21–16	
2007	Essex	Andrew Squire	Maldon	Yorkshire	Mark Walton	Nafferton	21–10	
2008	Devon	Sam Tolchard	Kings, Torquay	Derbyshire	Simon Skelton	Stute	21–8	
2009	Derbyshire	Simon Skelton	Stute	Surrey	Steve Tuohy	Egham	21–20	
2010	Essex	Steven Mitchinson	Romford	Sussex	Scott Edwards	Hove & Kingsway	21–8	
2011	County Durham	David Bolt	Silksworth	Warwickshire	Graham Ashby	Rugby	21–15	
2012	Hampshire	Tom Bishop	Atherley	Norfolk	Wayne Willgress	Norfolk BC	21–20	
2013	Worcestershire	Andrew Walters	Worcester	Suffolk	John Rednall	Felixstowe & Suffolk	21–14	
2014	Gloucestershire	Lee Williamson	Cheltenham	Devon	Jamie Chestney	Kings, Torquay	21–18	
2015	Cumbria	Ben Sherwen	Whitehaven	Yorkshire	Vinnie O'Neill	Middlesbrough	21–19	
2016	Kent	Simon Green	Sandwich	Worcestershire	Andrew Walters	Worcester	21–13	
2017	Northamptonshire	Jamie Walker	Northampton West End	Northamptonshire	Darren Childs	Northampton West End	21–14	
2018	Devon	Louis Ridout	Kings Torquay	Essex	Andrew Squire	Maldon	21–16	
2019	Essex	Ed Morris	Essex County	Northamptonshire	Jamie Walker	Northampton West End	21–14	
2020 No competition due to COVID-19 pandemic								
2021	Devon	Sam Tolchard	Kings, Torquay	County Durham	David Bolt	Silksworth	21–12	
2022	Essex	Ed Morris	Essex County	Warwickshire	Andrew Walters	Welford-on-Avon	21–17	
2023	Kent	Lewis King	Appleyard	Leicestershire	Darren Allsopp	New Lount	21–10	
2024	Devon	Jamie Walker	Culm Vale	Kent	Harry Goodwin	Appleyard	21–11	
2025	Kent	Isaac Jenner	Appleyard	Cumbria	David Forster	Workington	21–19	
2026	Huntingdon	Tristan Morton	Parkway	Leicestershire	Martin Allsopp	New Lount	21–13	
