= Bowls England National Championships (men's fours) =

British lawn bowls event

The men's fours is one of the events at the annual Bowls England National Championships.

== History ==
From 1905 until 1914, the event was called the Charles Wood Australian Cup.

During the 1908 final, the skip of the Upper Clapton team Mr H. Grounds collapsed and died during play. The title was awarded to Carlisle Edenside.

== Venues ==
- 1905–1907, 1910 (Upper Clapton BC, Clapton, London)
- 1908 (Streatham Constitutional Club, Streatham)
- 1909 (Leicester BC, Leicester}
- 1911 (Forest Hill BC, Forest Hill, London)
- 1912–1913 (Belmont BC, Streatham)
- 1914, 1926 (Bellingham BC, Bellingham, Catford)
- 1919 (South London & Balham clubs, Balham/Wandsworth)
- 1920 (Great Northern Railway AC, Gordon Hill, London)
- 1921 (Summerhill Gosforth & Portland clubs, Newcastle upon Tyne)
- 1922, 1928, 1935 (Croydon BC, South Croydon)
- 1923 (Wellingborough BC, Wellingborough)
- 1924, 1936, 1938–1939 (Temple Bowling Club, Denmark Hill)
- 1925 (City & Spa clubs, Gloucester)
- 1927 (Preston Park, Brighton)
- 1929 (Victoria Park & Westcote clubs, Leicester)
- 1930–1934, 1937, 1945–1957 (Paddington Recreation Ground)
- 1958–1973 (Watney's Sports Club, Mortlake)
- 1974–2013 (Worthing Bowls Club, Beach House Park)
- 2014–present (Victoria Park, Royal Leamington Spa)

== Sponsors ==
- 1982–1987 (Gateway Building Society)
- 1988–1991 (The Woolwich)
- 1993–1995 (Sanatogen)
- 2001–2001 (Yoplait)
- 2003–2005 (National Express)
- 2006–2006 (Waitrose)
- 2023–2025 (Aviva)

== Past winners ==
Year	County	Champions	Club	County	Runners-up	Club	Score	Ref
1905	Cumberland	M. Turner, G. W. Hutchinson, F. Telford, William Johnson	Carlisle Subscription	Middlesex	H.Rowlands, J.L.Thomas, C.Welch, H.C.Rowlands	Bounds Green	by 17 points	
1906	Northumberland	James Telford, John Pilluns, Fenwick	Newcastle West End	Middlesex	S. Moore, Newton	Upper Clapton	24–10	
1907	Cumberland	J. A. Halhead, J. Rogerson, J. Wigston, M. Johnstone	Carlisle West End	Kent	Stewart	Forest Hill	21–18	
1908	Cumberland	A. Smith, A. Nelson, T. Ridley, James Emmerson	Carlisle Edenside	Middlesex	Anderson, Woolven, Mackay, H. Grounds	Upper Clapton	w/o / scr	
1909	Northamptonshire	J. T. Goode, C. Vorley, J. W. Bellamy, G. P. Coe	Wellingborough	Northumberland	Lane, Fairfield, James Telford, W F Hamilton	Newcastle West End	20–17	
1910	Somerset	A. H. Pearse, S. O. Hall, W. N. Wake, F. Blackmore	Victoria, Weston-super-Mare	Cumberland	J. J. Ridley, E. Edmondson, H. McQuillan, William Johnson	Carlisle Subscription	17–14	
1911	Oxfordshire	John Fingland, A Thornitt, T Croft, W. A. Wilks	Banbury Chestnuts	Berkshire	T.Waldron, F.E.Blackmore, F.W.Thompson, H.F.Lindars	Reading	24–17	
1912	Northamptonshire	J. T. Goode, Mitchell, G. P. Coe, Woolston	Wellingborough	Middlesex	McKinstry, Brown, Birtles, Croxford	Paddington	25–22	
1913	Surrey	T. G. Dunno, P. Laing, F. MacGregor, W. Taylor	Dulwich	Kent	J. Muter, W. R. Moore, A. J. Tyler, J. Galloway	Bellingham	25–16	
1914	Berkshire	T. Waldron, J. Higgs, J. Burling, H. F. Lindars	Reading	Kent	A. M. Rix, H. G. Woodcock, S. Cornelins, D. T. Baguley	Gillingham	26–10	
1915–1918 No competition due to war
1919	Leicestershire	H Howard, W Glover, J Cope, W Cope	Belgrave, Leicester	Surrey	F Jelf, J Alexander, S Fewings, F MacGregor	Dulwich	30–26	
1920	County Durham	W. T. Wallace, R. Peacock, W. B. Shaw, C. Gibb	Ashbrooke, Sunderland	Oxfordshire	H. E. Alden, T. Basson, J. Elson, F. C. Sherlock	South Oxford	20–15	
1921	Northumberland	S. J. Dawson, W. Oliver, G. Elder, James Frith	Belgrave, Newcastle	Northamptonshire	S. Booth, R. Dexter, C. Vorley, W. J. Mitchell	Wellingborough	22–15	
1922	Leicestershire	H. Howard, W. Glover, J. Cope, W. Cope	Belgrave, Leicester	County Durham	E. Dinsley, T. Eckford, T. F. Heslop, J. J. Hall	Darlington East Park	20–18	
1923	Northumberland	W. Nixon, C. Thompson, W. E. Pitt, F. Hindmarsh	Alnwick	Essex	W. J Rigby, C. J Barratt, W. C Warwick, E. G Griffin	Central Park	26–13	
1924	Essex	F. Lucking, F. Taylor, W. Whife, G. Owen	Southend-on-Sea	Northumberland	J. Bell, J. E Gowland, W Jackson, Frank Taylor	Summerhill	20–19	
1925	Northumberland	S. J. Dawson, J. A. Gibson, A. Butterfield, W. H. Pallett	Belgrave, Newcastle	Berkshire	H. Brown, J. A. Wells, W. Foxcrfot, W. G. Lawrence	Prospect Park	28–14	
1926	Sussex	A.Robinson, C Wheater, W.T.Cripps, R.John	Preston, Brighton	Berkshire	W. J. Jones, H. A. Cannan, T. Webb, F. Bennett	Newbury	25–24	
1927	Kent	A.Y.Robertson, Percy Snow, G.Rogers, J.T.Dalton	Margate	Middlesex	E.Potts, H.S.Wright, J.Booth, Tom Potts	Harrow	18–17	
1928	Bedfordshire	S. J. Tomlin, R. Hawkins, W. Plowman, A. J. Tibbett	Luton Town	Northumberland	J. Parr, J. Gray, J. Buglass, W. E. Pitt	Alnwick	28–10	
1929	Hampshire	D. Spencer, W. G. Dear, T. Hopkins, C. H. Noyce	Basingstoke Town	Somerset	H.Rebbeck, R.Bishop, F.Shell, A.S.Pearce	Frome Selwood Printing Works	22–20	
1930	Middlesex	R. E. Dyer, S. Haigh, A. Richings, Fred Hindmarsh	Lammas, Ealing	Hertfordshire	H. W. Wentworth, F. Williams, A. Pikesley, A. D. Spary	St Albans	19–17	
1931	Surrey	W.J. Suckling, E.W.J. Coffee, W.H. Mowlam, G. Redstone	Kingston Canbury	Isle of Wight	H. Castle, A. J. Hurman, Edwin Topp, T. Hodgkinson	Ryde	24–23	
1932	Hampshire	H. Parsons, E. S. Fuidge, J. Pollock, James Edney	Atherley, Southampton	Somerset	Frank Russ, J.Phipps, Reginald Bryant, W.Price	Sydney Gardens, Bath	23–18	
1933	Hampshire	B. H. Matthews, H. J. Head, H.W. Johnson, J.W. Rhodes	Southsea Waverley	Devon	A. L. Ainsworth, H. A. Bellamy, J. W. Fisher, Harold Webber	Torbay Country Club	27–17	
1934	Sussex	A. Cole, W. T. Bevan, S. C. Griffin, R. Whiteside<	Worthing	Hampshire	J. R. Sims, G. H. Middleton, A. Hitchcock, P. E. Hall	Southbourne	23–13	
1935	County Durham	C. Pickersgill, J. S. Reed, J. Pickersgill, C. Gibb	Sunderland	Warwickshire	C. D. Billington, W. J. Wrigley, J. A. Meredith, F. T. Miller	Avenue, Leamington Spa	20–9	
1936	Hampshire	E. Havelock, A. Walters, H. Perkins, George Curtis	Boscombe Cliff	Middlesex	C. Clark, A. Bailey, S. Nugent, W Glynne	Parsons Green	20–14	
1937	Surrey	J. Killick, P. C. W. Silcock, W. Taylor, J. A. Morrison	Sheen Common	Leicestershire	C.Thorne, J.Garratt, G. Orams, W.F.Wade	Hinckley	19–14	
1938	Middlesex	H.A.Betteridge, G.Canning, Major W.H.Godby, C.A.Birtles	Paddington	Cumberland	H. Stevens, A. Millar, G. Roden, J. Kilgour	Siddick	16–15	
1939	Buckinghamshire	L. Hart, E. Yates, V. Cartwright, E. Jefferies	High Wycombe	Bedfordshire	W. Inskip, A. Gillett, H. Bull, S. Crawley	Bedford Borough	18–14	
1940–1944 No competition due to war
1945	Essex	C. W. J. Miller, W. C. Porter, H. N. Porter, R. Wadsworth	Ilford	Kent	T. H. Harman, B. Bassant, Sidney Filmer, Colin Walton	Faversham	18–11	
1946	Kent	T. H. Harman, B. Bassant, Sidney Filmer, Colin Walton	Faversham	Suffolk	H. Ellis, C. McLaren, F. W. E. Collins, W. F. Stubbs	Marlborough, Ipswich	22–8	
1947	Surrey	G. Godwin, S. A. Vallance, C. H. Godwin, Charles Walder	Redhill	Oxfordshire	J. W. Gordon, M. L. King, H. J. Wallace, S. H. Smith	South Oxford	17–14	
1948	Oxfordshire	H. T. Allen, H. I. Fisher, J. Holden, Algernon R. Allen	Oxford City & County	Gloucestershire	J. Lane, H. Brown, W. Woodward, C. L. M. Smith	Gloucester Wagon Works	20–16	
1949	Bedfordshire	F. Oliver, H. Burgon, C. Jones, C. Tomlin	SKF Luton	County Durham	R. Haggle, J. Rosser, J. Pannett, A. E. Jones	Stockton United	31–16	
1950	Hampshire	L. A. Walters, J. W. Curtis, H. W. Richardson, W. E. Oxenham	Richmond Park	Kent	W. McIver, T. Downing, W. Lines, C Couves	Eltham	21–19	
1951	Oxfordshire	H. T. Allen, J. Fingland, J. Holden, Algernon R. Allen	Oxford City & County	Surrey	H. Ford, H. Foster, J. O. Passell, W. J. Wright	Motspur Park	22–20	
1952	Berkshire	C. Snow, N. Wakefield, R. H. Wrate, V. C. Wakefield	Prospect Park, Reading	Hampshire	Fred Musselwhite, William Leary, W. Brown, Herbert Croat	Fleming Park, Eastleigh	22–21	
1953	Dorset	L. Giles, J. R. Walker, W. Blackmore, R. C. Belben	Poole Park	Hampshire	E. Newnham, F. Cash, H. Coles, J. T. Barclay	Moordown	23–20	
1954	Leicestershire	Jock Latto, R Burton, A Toach, B Branston	Belgrave	Northamptonshire	W. J. Stone, Frank Purser, C. J. Knight, Albert Knight	Abington, Northampton	28–14	
1955	Wiltshire	G. King, John Day, A. Boulter, C. R. Waite	Wootton Bassett	County Durham	J. E. Archibold, D. W. Richie, S. Thompson, J. E. Addis	Eldon Grove, West Hartlepool	20–15	
1956	Hampshire	T. Ellis, R. Squires, L. Lane, A. Spooner	Fleet United	Suffolk	E. A. Baker, A. J Haggar, R. H. Denny, G. W.Last	Rookery	19–17	
1957	Somerset	Reginald Bryant, David Bryant, L.Harris, Roger Harris	Clevedon	Berkshire	M. Manifold, J. Rivers, C. S. Reed, G. K. Collyer	Wokingham	25–15	
1958	Cumberland	H. Heap, J. A. Wilson, G. Sewell, J. Bell	Morton Sundour	Kent	A. L. Ward, W. C. Waghorn, F. H. Watling, S. E. Martin	Livesey Memorial	21–18	
1959	Buckinghamshire	E.Barnard, E.Goodchild, J Paton, W Clark	Princes Risborough	Cornwall	T H Tonkin, F H Tonkin, J. Blewett, J F Stafford	Penlee	17–11	
1960	Essex	A.Pratt, R.Stevens, H. G.Brigstock, P.Smith	Essex County	County Durham	R. Wealands, C. Holiday, G. Coates, C. Richardson	Darlington Park	25–11	
1961	Sussex	Gordon Sparkes & Arthur Knowling Jr, John Scadgell, Harry Ward	Worthing	Herefordshire	J. Finney, G. Mitchell, H. Dickinson, N. Knight	Hereford	27–13	
1962	Buckinghamshire	A.Whitehead, H.Harwood, H.Soen, L.Hall	Slough I.C.I.	Oxfordshire	W. R. Scaldwell, R. J. Room, C. W. Lester, Algernon R. Allen	Oxford City & County	20–16	
1963	Northamptonshire	Stan Carter, Frank Marchant, Les Hough, Bobby Stenhouse	Wellingborough	Buckinghamshire	H. Phillips, J. Abbot, C. Small, A. W. Philbey	Aylesbury Borough	21–12	
1964	Sussex	J. Evans, J. B. Hogan, H. Turrell, Ralph Lewis	Preston, Brighton	Middlesex	Michael Stone, Arthur Stone, Arthur Morgan, Tom Smith	Clissold	21–12	
1965	Hampshire	A. Carter, W. T. Rich, R. A. Stephens, J. A. Gibson	Bournemouth Electric	Essex	F. Humphrey, A. E. Moore, G. H. Salter, W.F. Johns	Colchester West End	26–9	
1966	Northumberland	W. Charlton, Arnold Bryson, George Boag, Fred Lumley	Summerhill	Gloucestershire	R. Aubrey, H.Robertson, A.Bailey, W.Holder	Greyfriars	28–15	
1967	Kent	Jack McMeakin, Ibbotson	Sandwich	Hampshire	I. Williams, M. Roberts, Daniel Hishon, Jack Stainer	Civil Service, Portsmouth	22–20	
1968	Somerset	William Elliott, Reg Bryant, David Rhys Jones, David Bryant	Clevedon	Hampshire	C. Jones, S. Bonner, Jimmy Davidson, Walter Phillips	Boscombe Cliff	21–20	
1969	Somerset	William Elliott, Reg Bryant, David Rhys Jones, David Bryant MBE	Clevedon	Hampshire	B. Galfskiy, W. Stewart, E. C. Wedsell, H. Powell	British Legion Farnborough	20–13	
1970	County Durham	Eric Alderton, Danny Winning, Harold Strong, Bob Main	Blackhall C. W.	Middlesex	G. N. Cook, A. Watterson, A. Smith, T. G. Eburne	Cambridge Park	21–19	
1971	Somerset	John Knight, William Elliott, David Rhys Jones, David Bryant MBE	Clevedon	Lincolnshire	H. Hardy, W. J. Laud, J. W. East, G. Wilson	Royal Mail Cart	27–13	
1972	Lincolnshire	Dick Meades, Brian Sherriff, Dick Vinters, Ray Stanley	Burton House	Middlesex	Maurice Ellicott, Dave Thomas, Stan Hayward, Eddie Hunt	Paddington	25–16	
1973	Dorset	Ken Edmonds, Don Carrier, Eric Blaston, Ron Porter	Poole Park	Somerset	W. Anderson, G. Whitrow, G. Mordock, Frank Worth	Bristol	18–8	
1974	Worcestershire	A.C.Hall, Alec Jackson, R. Watkins, Tony Russell	Brotherhood	Middlesex	Jack Horn, J.Sambrook, P.Down, Tony Bantock	A.E.C.Southall	19–17	
1975	Norfolk	Arthur Rix, Cecil Whitwood, George Ward, Chris Ward	Cromer & District (EBA)	Middlesex	N. M. Thompson, T. Reeves, R. A. Gibbins, Reginald Paine	London Transport	23–19	
1976	Hertfordshire	Reginald Cross, Gordon Turner, Norman Kemp, Ernest Barker	Baldock Town	Somerset	John Knight, William Elliott, David Rhys Jones, David Bryant MBE	Clevedon	25–8	
1977	Essex	Fred Bromley, Dennis Cullum, Clifford Smith, David Wakefield	Aveley	Hampshire	Jack Gough, Norman Shelley, John Wiseman, Peter Line	Atherley	20–15	
1978	Warwickshire	Russ Robinson, Reg Hacker, Ken Dodd, Keith Robinson	Erdington Court	Buckinghamshire	J. Stearn, P. Passfield, G. Stevenson, Len Somers	Chesham	22–10	
1979	Cumbria	Ian Graham, Harry Graham, Jim Heap, Ray Moore	Carlisle Subscription)	Berkshire	George Shepherd, Neil Stradling, Brian Griffiths, Michael Willis	Wantage	20–19	
1980	Norfolk	Graham Pease, George Ward, Reggie Baker, Chris Ward	Cromer & District (EBA)	Hampshire	Graham Standley, Ray Bundy, Norman Shelley, Peter Line	Banister Park	19–16	
1981	County Durham	David Kilner, Maurice Alsop, Ronnie Pringle, Cliff Simpson	Owton Lodge	Northumberland	Steve Proctor, Chris Palmer, Ian Spoor, Kevin Bone	Gosforth	27–11	
1982	Nottinghamshire	A. Lovatt, B. Clark, K. Euerby, Bob Dickens	Castle	Surrey	D. Walsh, J. Fitzharris, D. Campbell, J. Rideout	Old Dean, Camberley	21–14	
1983	Lancashire	Duncan Wilson, Tony Horobin, Alec Atkinson, Gordon Niven	Bolton	Oxfordshire	Peter Sargeant, David Lewis, Clive Weston, Robin Hewson	Summertown	25–18	
1984	Hampshire	Laurie Pull, Peter Pull, Russell Morgan, Chris Paice	Boscombe Cliff	Yorkshire	Ronnie Baker, Dick Moore, Les Berry, Tony Frosdick	Middlesbrough	18–16	
1985	Essex	David Griggs, David Jarrold, Graham Arnold, Jim Aiton	Aldersbrook)	Cambridgeshire	Tony Harley, Mick Chamberlain, Derek Rutter, Colin Chamberlain	Christchurch	27–15	
1986	Buckinghamshire	John Hobden, Martin Ballantyne, Peter Dickinson, Melvin Vickers	Stony Stratford	Sussex	Alan Clarke, Chris Reynolds, Malcolm Fever, Doug Whetstone	Lindfield	27–22	
1987	Buckinghamshire	Derek Plater, Colin Perrotet, Les Richardson, Mick Richardson	Aylesbury Town	Surrey	Mark Whatling, Gary Davidson, Tim Orr, Kelvin Barnard	Temple	20–17	
1988	Oxfordshire	Steve Beacon, Chris Quainton, Chris Allen, Gary Harrington	Summertown	Middlesex	Colin Hopper, Bob Middleton, Gerry Smyth, Steve Halmai	Paddington	15–14	
1989	Kent	John Chandler, Jimmy Cross, Terry Heppell, Martyn Sekjer	Blackheath & Greenwich	Leicestershire	Alan Hewitt, Ian Wynter, David Hemstock, Colin Shaw	Brush	17–16	
1990	Somerset	Steve Gait, Derek Chivers, Terry Perkins, Ian Middlemast	Bath	Nottinghamshire	Paul Jackson, Geoff Hufton Jr., Geoff Hufton Sr., Jamie Mills	Mansfield Colliery	20–13	
1991	Berkshire	John Smith, Bill Bayliss, Ian Baker, Jim Clarke	Wokingham	Wiltshire	Norman Remington, Iain Cameron, Steve Remington, Andy Moore	Spencer, Melksham	21–20	
1992	Hampshire	Ian Rawlinson, Mark Warren, Chris Stanger, Nicky Jones	Bournemouth	Hampshire	Michael Scripps, John Winkley, Robert Robinson, James Marsland	Cove	17–15	
1993	Berkshire	Graham Waldron, Adam Graves, Robert Newman, Michael Newman	Reading	Middlesex	S. Wheeler, W. Hulbert, A. Lines, Gerry Smyth	Shepherds Bush Cricket	22–13	
1994	Gloucestershire	Andrew Wills, Les Gillett, Simon Jones, Tony Allcock MBE	Cheltenham	Hampshire	K. Manderson, D. Archibald, Peter Line, Graham Standley	Atherley	21–13	
1995	Sussex	John Pannett, Michael Rapley, James Morley, Leigh Prince	Hollingbury Park	Middlesex	A. J. L. Barker, R. M. Clarke, L. P. Mulligan, Steven Stockley	Parsons Green	18–17	
1996	Cambridgeshire	Maurice Miller, Brian Baxter, Tony Merrell, Lee Miller	March Conservative	Cumbria	Ken Johnston, David Taylor, Richard Sampson, Trevor Taylor	Courtfield	20–18	
1997	Wiltshire	Mark Dyer, Tony Stevenson, Mel Biggs, Steve Warren	Swindon Westlecot	Somerset	Barrie Smith, Mike Davies, Richard Billington, Don Fowkes	Bridgewater BCL	19–15	
1998	Oxfordshire	Alan Prew, George Moon, Greg Moon, Les Gillett	Banbury Borough	Northumberland	Keith Wood, Mike Bennett, Mick McGreevy, Richard Train	Summerhill	20–13	
1999	Buckinghamshire	Mark Bantock, Alan Price, John McGuinness, Kirk Smith	Gerrards Cross	Kent	Ben Hornsby, Martyn Sekjer, Gary Smith, Andy Thomson	Blackheath & Greenwich	21–5	
2000	Lancashire	Alan Mayne, Gary Harrington, Ian Mayne, David Holt	Acton Bridge	Cumbria	Craig Docherty, David Taylor, Stuart Airey, Trevor Taylor	Courtfield	24–14	
2001	Derbyshire	Andrew Harris, Darren Allsopp, Martin Allsopp, Stuart Thomas	South Derbyshire Miners Welfare	County Durham	Tony Bousfield, Neil Buckley, Peter Edwards, Andrew Kirtland	Darlington Railway Athletic	24–14	
2002	Nottinghamshire	Nick Cammack, Michael Owen, Duncan Robinson, Brett Morley	Siemens	Cornwall	Gary Watkins, Tim Phillips, Mark Foster, Steven Lawer	Carnon Downs	25–12	
2003	Cornwall	Ian Powell, Mike Sturtridge, Ian Ball, Richard Bray	Stenalees	Lancashire	Duncan Wilson, Martin Crellin, Fergus Muat, Alec Atkinson	Manchester Commonwealth	20–17	
2004	Surrey	Norman Vigor, Andy Hawes, Graham Vigor, Dave Clark	Croydon	County Durham	Tony Bousfield, Neil Buckley, Peter Edwards, Andrew Kirtland	Darlington Railway Athletic	22–14	
2005	Berkshire	Dale Hall, Malcolm Edney, Ian Snowden, John Stradling	Hagbourne	Hampshire	Barrie Seymour, Derick Faulkner, Roy Leake, Peter Ward	Ringwood	18–17	
2006	Cornwall	Charlie Gay, Bill Lawer, Dave Perrin, Tim Phillips	Carnon Downs	Lancashire	Mark Dawes, John Walker, Barry Kitson, David Colbourne	Bolton	21–20	
2007	Cumbria	Danny May, Ian Airey, Richard Chandler, Stuart Airey	Carlisle Subscription	Essex	Steven Mahoney, Brian Whiteley, Mark Morhall, Joe Stamper	Falcon	20–18	
2008	Somerset	James Branfield, Pip Branfield, Darren Mason, John Hick	Clevedon	Nottinghamshire	Paul Martlew, Mike Owen, Duncan Robinson, Brett Morley	Trent Vale	18–17	
2009	Leicestershire	John Torrington, Vic Mayes, Steven Wade, Andrew Irons	Blaby	Devon	Mark Hopkins, Jeff Tolchard, Alan Hirst, Sean Johnson	Kings, Torquay	23–22	
2010	Cambridgeshire	Martin Pankhurst, Kevin Bane, Ian Miller, Richard Catton	Cambridge & County	Kent	David Mason, Scott Whiting, Joe Kelly, Grant Allen	Herne Bay	18–17	
2011	Berkshire	Bernard Byles, Matthew Hyde, Simon Jones, Alan Price	Desborough	Somerset	Ben Hamilton, Matt Hamilton, Steve Turner, Louis Ridout	Ilminster	27–14	
2012	Northamptonshire	Mark Corbyn, Darren Lyman, Neil Corbyn, Paul Broderick	Wellingborough	Cambridgeshire	Martin Pankhurst, Kevin Bane, Ian Miller, Richard Catton	Cambridge & County	29–10	
2013	Cornwall	Colin Smith, David Parr, Nigel Laity, Colin Binny	Chacewater	Cambridgeshire	Roger Mansfield, Les Bradford, Neil Flack, Steve Jacobs	Sawston	27–7	
2014	County Durham	Phil Dixon, Neal Ridley, Ian Riches, David Bolt	Silksworth	Yorkshire	Ben Render, Shaun Wells, Dominic Kelly, Nigel Brignall	Nafferton	21–19	
2015	Worcestershire	Tony Yapp, Mark Atkins, Allan Griffiths, Ryan Atkins	St Dunstans	Devon	Joe Melmore, Matt Bass, Louis Ridout, Sam Tolchard	Kings Torquay	19–14	
2016	Northamptonshire	Rob White, Ian Bland, Wayne Stanley, Dominic Graham	Northampton Express	Devon	Ollie Lewis, Stuart Evans, Lee Haywood, Ryan Whitlock	Shaldon	20–19	
2017	Herefordshire	Tom Holmes, Mark Atkins, Phil Middleton, Ryan Atkins	Ledbury	Kent	Josh Tingey, Roger Williams, Dex Weyand, Ken Weyand	St Lawrence	27–12	
2018	Wiltshire	Kyle Anderson, Mike Snell, Dave Godwin, Steve Snell	Royal Wootton Bassett	Lancashire	Jason Parkinson, David Lockhart, Ian Mayne, Chris Gale	Heaton Hall	17–15	
2019	Buckinghamshire	Tom McGuinness, David Ross, Kirk Smith, John McGuinness	Gerrards Cross	Berkshire	Gareth Colebrooke, Ray Nash, Mitchell Cooper, Ryan Buckett	Suttons	23–22	
2020 No competition due to COVID-19 pandemic								
2021	Cumbria	Stephen Cook, Ian Williams, James Park, David Forster	Workington	Buckinghamshire	Tom McGuinness, David Ross, Kirk Smith, John McGuinness	Gerrards Cross	20–5	
2022	Huntingdonshire	Ean Morton, Simon Law, Stuart Popple, Tristan Morton	Parkway	Kent	John Coatham, Jason Haskins, Steve Marrett, Roger Kendrick	VCD	22–17	
2023	Lincolnshire	Steve Hill, Harry Mycock, Dominic McVittie, Martin Spencer	Royal Mail Cart	Leicestershire	Nick Wardle, Jonathan Green, Chris Moore, Joe Dawson	Kingscroft	18–13	
2024	Worcs	Steve Poyner, Chris Barton, Gareth Burbridge, Richard Moule	Vines Park	Surrey	Rob Dodds, Joseph Tindall, Jamie Tindall, Charlie Souter	Southey	18–15	
2025	Derbys	Josh Grant, Ashley Clipston, Dan Thornhill, Philip Broughton	Stute	Leics	Nick Wardle, Jonathan Green, Chris Moore, Joe Dawson	Kingscroft	19–14	
2026	Glos	Louie Hodges, Nig Cansdale, Lee Williamson, Finley Williamson	Cheltenham	Glos	Mike Ricketts, Anthony Cotton, Alex White, Mike Holmes	Cheltenham	20–5	
