= Bowls England National Championships (men's singles two wood) =

British lawn bowls event

The men's singles two wood is one of the events at the annual Bowls England National Championships.

The two-wood singles is a newer variation of the game; see Glossary of bowls terms.

== History ==
The first competition for two wood singles was held in 2012, although the women's equivalent, the Bowls England National Championships (women's singles two wood) was first held in 1939.

== Venues ==
- 2012–2013 (Worthing Bowls Club, Beach House Park)
- 2014–present (Victoria Park, Royal Leamington Spa)

== Sponsors ==
- 2023–2025 (Aviva)

== Past winners ==
Year	Champion	Club	County	Runner-up	Club	County	Score	Ref
2012	Tristan Morton	White Hart Warboys	Hunts	Vinnie O'Neill	Middlesbrough	Yorks	13–12	
2013	Ben Render	Nafferton	Yorks	Louis Ridout	Illminster	Som	16–12	
2014	Andrew Owens	Weston St Andrew	Som	Alex Walton	White Hart Warboys	Hunts	16–9	
2015	Jamie Walker	Northampton West End	Northants	Andrew Squire	Maldon	Essex	17–3	
2016	Sam Tolchard	Kings Torquay	Devon	Bradley Coles	Garston	Herts	17–2	
2017	Sam Watts	Watlington	Oxon	Arron Brownley	Church Warsop	Notts	15–12	
2018	Ed Morris	Essex County	Essex	Peter Ward	Sports Centre Southampton	Hants	14–13	
2019	Shaun Jones	Ross-on-Wye	Heref	Tom Bishop	Bromley	Kent	17–10	
No competition due to COVID-19 pandemic								
2021	Sam Tolchard	Kings, Torquay	Devon	Ed Morris	Essex County	Essex	17–13	
2022	Sam Tolchard	Kings, Torquay	Devon	Jack Emmerson	Newark Northern	Notts	17–13	
2023	Mark Ireland	Avenue Coventry	Warks	Alan Geary	Boscombe Cliff	Hants	16–10	
2024	Tom Bishop	Hollycroft Park	Leics	Mark Housley	Langwith Junction	Notts	17–10	
2025	Dylan Martin	Garston	Herts	Jordan Philpott	Royal Mail Cart	Lincs	17–12	
2026	Chris Brereton	Welford-on-Avon	Warwickshire	Joe Sanford	West Wickham	Kent	15–14	
