= Andrew Walters (bowls) =

English lawn and indoor bowls player

Personal information
- Nationality: British (English)
- Born: 1987 (age 38–39)

Sport
- Sport: Lawn / indoor bowls
- Club: Welford On Avon BC
Medal record
Representing England
European Championships
Gold medal – first place	2019 Guernsey	pairs
Bronze medal – third place	2019 Guernsey	team
English Nationals
Gold medal – first place	2013	singles

Andrew Walters (born 1987) is an English male lawn and indoor bowler. He bowls for Welford upon Avon Bowling Club.

== Career ==
He is an England international and was the National singles champion in 2014 during the Men's National Championships.

In 2019, he won the pairs gold medal and team bronze medal at the European Bowls Championships. In 2022, he reached his third singles final at the National Championships where he lost out to Ed Morris 21-17 at the 2022 Bowls England National Finals.

In 2023, he represented England in the British Isles series. The following year in 2024, he finished runner-up in the national pairs.

== Awards ==
He was awarded the 2009 Young Player of the Year by the World Bowls Tour.

== Personal life ==
He married fellow bowls international Amy Stanton on 22 April 2017.
