= Ian Lesley =

Personal information
- Nationality: English

Sport
- Sport: Lawn bowls
- Club: Shaldon BC
Medal record
Representing England
Atlantic Bowls Championships
Bronze medal – third place	2019 Cardiff	triples

Ian Lesley is an English international lawn bowler.

== Bowls career ==
Lesley became an English national champion in 2016 after winning the triples at the English National Bowls Championships bowling for Shaldon BC. In 2015 he won the triples bronze medal at the Atlantic Bowls Championships.
