= Tom Bishop (bowls) =

English bowls player

Personal information
- Nationality: British (English)
- Born: 1991 (age 34–35)

Sport
- Sport: Lawn bowls
- Club: Hollycroft BC (outdoors); Formally Cyphers IBC
Medal record
Representing England
World Singles Champion of Champions
Gold medal – first place	2013 New Zealand	Men's Singles
English Nationals
Gold medal – first place	2012	singles
Gold medal – first place	2021	mixed fours
Gold medal – first place	2024	2w singles

Tom Bishop (born 1991), is an English male International lawn bowler.

== Bowls career ==
Bishop won the English National title in 2012 representing the Atherley club and Hampshire. By winning the National title he represented England at the 2013 World Singles Champion of Champions event in Christchurch, New Zealand where he won the gold medal after defeating Alistair White of Scotland 8-4, 9-5 in the final.

He switched clubs from Atherley BC in Hampshire to Bromley BC in Kent and was runner-up in the 2019 National Championships Two Wood singles.

He won the National Mixed Fours along with Amy Cheeseman, Christine Hewison and Michael Cheeseman in 2021 and in 2024 won the national two wood singles at the 2024 Bowls England National Finals.

== Personal life ==
He studied Construction Project Management at Aston University.
