= Mick Cooper =

English lawn bowls competitor

Personal information
- Nationality: British (English)
- Born: 24 December 1923 Lutterworth
- Died: 1997 Northamptonshire

Sport
- Sport: Lawn bowls
- Club: Kettering Lodge BC
Medal record
Representing England
World Outdoor Championships
Bronze medal – third place	1966 Kyeemagh	team

Derek Eugene Cooper known as Mick Cooper (1923-1997) was an England international lawn bowls competitor.

== Bowls career ==
He represented England at the 1966 World Outdoor Bowls Championship where he won a bronze medal in the team event (Leonard Trophy). He was a member of the triples and fours.

He won the 1965 and 1969 triples titles, in addition to the 1969 fours title at the England Men's National Championships when bowling for Kettering Lodge BC.

He started bowling in 1951.
