= Charlie Burch =

British lawn bowler

Personal information
- Nationality: British (English)
- Born: 24 November 1919 Woodbridge, Suffolk, England
- Died: 2001 (aged 81) Taunton, Somerset, England

Sport
- Club: Taunton BC
Medal record
Representing England
British Isles Championships
Gold medal – first place	1979	singles

Charles William Mark Burch (24 November 1919 – 2001) was an English international lawn bowler.

== Bowls career ==
Burch became the English National champion in 1978 when he defeated the legendary David Bryant during the 1978 National Championship singles final. He subsequently won the singles at the British Isles Bowls Championships in 1979.

He represented England at the 1978 Commonwealth Games in the fours event, at the 1978 Commonwealth Games in Edmonton, Alberta, Canada.
