= Bob Robertson (bowls) =

English bowls player (1926–2019)

Personal information
- Nationality: British (English)
- Born: 1926
- Died: 3 August 2019 (aged 93) Middlesbrough

Sport
- Club: Middlesbrough Co-operative BC

Robert Robertson (1926–3 August 2019), was an England international lawn bowler.

== Bowls career ==
Robertson finished runner-up to the legendary David Bryant at the 1972 National Championship singles final.

He represented England in the fours event, at the 1974 British Commonwealth Games in Christchurch, New Zealand.

In 1972 he was the Yorkshire singles county champion. In addition he was the pairs champion in 1971, triples in 1969 and fours champion in 1971.

In 1978 he appeared at his second Commonwealth Games when he participated in the fours again.
