= Simon Green (bowls) =

English lawn bowler

Personal information
- Nationality: British (English)
- Born: 1983

Sport
- Sport: Lawn bowls
- Club: Sandwich BC

Simon Green (born 1983) is an English male lawn bowler.

== Bowls career ==
Green became the English champion when he won the singles tournament during the 2016 National Championships.

He bowls for Sandwich Bowling Club.
