= Ben Sherwen =

2015 English lawn bowls champion

Personal information
- Nationality: British (English)
- Born: 1983 (age 41–42)

Sport
- Sport: Lawn bowls
- Club: Whitehaven BC

Ben Sherwen (born 1983) is an English male lawn bowler.

== Bowls career ==
Sherwen became the English champion when he won the singles tournament during the 2015 National Championships.

He bowls for Whitehaven Bowling Club.
