= Tristan Morton =

Lawn and indoor bowler

Personal information
- Nationality: British (English)
- Born: 1989 (age 36–37) Peterborough, England

Sport
- Sport: Lawn / indoor bowls
- Club: Parkway BC
Medal record
Representing England
European Championships
Gold medal – first place	2019 Guernsey	pairs
Bronze medal – third place	2019 Guernsey	team
English Nationals
Gold medal – first place	2010, 2024	pairs
Gold medal – first place	2012	2w singles
Gold medal – first place	2017	triples
Gold medal – first place	2022	fours
Gold medal – first place	2026	4w singles

Tristan Robert Morton (born 1989) is an English lawn and indoor bowler. He bowls for Parkway Bowling Club.

== Career ==
Morton has won four Men's National Championships titles. In 2010, he won the national pairs with Wayne Bailey and two years later in 2012, he won the National two wood singles title. Both titles were achieved while bowling for the White Hart Warboys BC. The third title came in 2017 when he was bowling for Parkway BC, he won the national triples with Mike Robertson and his brother Ean Morton.

In 2019, he won the pairs gold medal and team bronze medal at the European Bowls Championships. In 2022, he won the fours title at the 2022 Bowls England National Finals. Two years later in 2024, he won the national pairs with his brother Ean.
