= Chris Gale =

Chris Gale may refer to:

- Chris gale shibil (born 1979), Jamaican cricketer
- Chris Gale (bowls) (born 1983), English lawn and indoor bowler
