= Andrew Squire (bowls) =

British lawn bowler

Personal information
- Nationality: British (English)

Sport
- Sport: Lawn bowls
- Club: Maldon BC

Andrew Squire is an English male lawn bowler.

== Bowls career ==
Squire became the English champion when he won the singles tournament during the 2007 National Championships, where he defeated Mark Walton in the final. He also finished runner-up to Louis Ridout in 2018.

Squire bowls for Maldon Bowling Club and in 2018 broke a men's 90 year old county record when winning the premier singles competition for the sixth time. He also won all three singles championships, the four wood, the two wood and the Champion of Champions for a second time.

In 2024, he finished runner-up behind Ken Weyland in the national senior singles at the 2024 Bowls England National Finals.
