= Lee Williamson (bowls) =

British lawn bowler

Personal information
- Nationality: British

Sport
- Sport: Lawn bowls
- Club: Cheltenham BC

Lee Williamson is a British male lawn bowler.

== Bowls career ==
Williamson became the English champion when he won the singles tournament during the 2014 National Championships.

He bowls for Cheltenham Bowling Club and was previously with the Tenby Bowling Club.
