= David Bolt (bowls) =

English bowls player (born 1973)

Personal information
- Nationality: English
- Born: 23 December 1978 (age 47) Sunderland

Sport
- Sport: Lawn / indoor bowls
- Club: Silksworth BC; South Shields IBC
Medal record
Representing England
Commonwealth Games
Bronze medal – third place	2018 Gold Coast	fours
Atlantic Bowls Championships
Bronze medal – third place	2019 Cardiff	triples
Hong Kong International Bowls Classic
Gold medal – first place	2016	singles
Silver medal – second place	2017	pairs
British Isles Championships
Gold medal – first place	2015	fours
English Nationals
Gold medal – first place	2011	singles
Gold medal – first place	2014	fours
Silver medal – second place	2021	singles

David Bolt (born 1973) is an English male lawn and indoor bowler.

== Bowls career ==
Bolt is an England international and was the National singles champion in 2011 and National fours champion in 2014 during the Men's National Championships.

In 2016, he won the Hong Kong International Bowls Classic singles title and the following year finished runner-up in the pairs with Taylor Monk.

He was selected as part of the English team for the 2018 Commonwealth Games on the Gold Coast in Queensland where he claimed a bronze medal in the Fours with Jamie Chestney, Louis Ridout and Sam Tolchard.

In 2019 he won the triples bronze medal at the Atlantic Bowls Championships and in 2021 was runner-up to Sam Tolchard in the National singles.

== Personal life ==
Bolt was a postman by trade but set up a bowls shop business at the South Shields Bowling Centre in 2016.
