= John Hick (bowls) =

English lawn bowler

Personal information
- Nationality: English

Sport
- Club: Clevedon BC
Medal record
Representing England
Atlantic Bowls Championships
Gold medal – first place	2011 Paphos	triples

John Hick is an English male international lawn bowler.

== Bowls career ==
Hick became an English national champion in 2008 after winning fours title at the English National Bowls Championships.

He won the triples gold medal at the Atlantic Bowls Championships in 2011.
