= Fred Horn (bowls) =

English lawn bowler

Personal information
- Nationality: British (English)
- Born: 1896
- Died: 1980 (aged 83–84) Torbay, England

Sport
- Club: Torquay BC

Fred Horn (1896 – 1980) was an England international lawn bowler.

== Biography ==
Horn made his England international debut in 1949 and first captained England in 1954. In 1951, he reached the final of the national pairs title, bowling with Ben Morgan for the Torquay Bowls club and the following year in 1952 won the title.

He competed for the England team in the pairs at the 1958 British Empire and Commonwealth Games in Cardiff with Harold Shapland, where they finished in sixth place. He was an English international from 1949 to 1965.

A retired tobacconist, he was living at St. Efrides Road in Torquay during 1959 and was a Devon county singles champion in 1949, 1950, 1954 and 1956.

In 1967, he reached the final of the National singles but lost to 21–12 to Bill Irish.
