= Bill Hobart =

British lawn bowler

Personal information
- Nationality: British (English)
- Born: 9 January 1948 (age 78) Lincolnshire, England

Sport
- Sport: Lawn & indoor bowls
- Club: Boston Sleaford Road BC (outdoors); Boston IBC (indoors)

William J. Hobart (born 9 January 1948) is a former English international lawn and indoor bowler.

== Bowls career ==
He was an English international from 1978 until 1985 (outdoors) and indoors until 1988.

=== Commonwealth Games ===
He represented England in the pairs, at the 1982 Commonwealth Games in Brisbane, Queensland, Australia.

=== National ===
He was runner-up in the 1976 National Championships.

== Personal life ==
He was a director of a company supplying bowls equipment.
