= Gary Harrington =

British lawn bowler

Personal information
- Nationality: British (English)
- Born: 1962 (age 63–64) Oxford, England

Sport
- Sport: Lawn bowls
- Club: Summertown BC; Acton Bridge BC
Medal record
Representing England
British Isles Championships
Gold medal – first place	1989	fours

Gary P Harrington (born 1962) is a former English international lawn bowler.

== Bowls career ==
Harrington won a National Championship in 1993 when he won the Champion of Champions title. He also won two fours titles in 1988 and 2000. During the 1988 success, he received a reprimand in the quarter final match.

He represented England at the 1990 Commonwealth Games in the fours event, at the 1990 Commonwealth Games in Auckland, New Zealand.

He bowled for Oxfordshire and Summertown BC and later Lancashire and Acton Bridge BC.
