= Lawn bowls at the 2018 Commonwealth Games – Men's fours =

2018 Commonwealth Games Lawn Bowls Men's Fours at Broadbeach Bowls Club, Australia

Lawn bowls – Men's fours at the 2018 Commonwealth Games
- Venue: Broadbeach Bowls Club
- Dates: 9 – 13 April 2018
- Competitors: 76 from 19 nations

Medalists
gold medal	Alex Marshall; Derek Oliver; Paul Foster; Ronnie Duncan	Scotland
silver medal	Aron Sherriff; Barrie Lester; Brett Wilkie; Nathan Rice	Australia
bronze medal	David Bolt; Jamie Chestney; Louis Ridout; Sam Tolchard	England

Lawn bowls men's fours at the 2018 Commonwealth Games was held at the Broadbeach Bowls Club in the Gold Coast, Australia from April 9 to 13. A total of 76 athletes from 19 associations participated in the event. Scotland won the gold medal, defeating Australia in the final. England the bronze medal.

== Sectional play ==
The top two from each section advance to the knockout stage.

=== Section A ===
Rank	Nation	Athletes	MP	MW	MT	ML	FR	AG	PD	PTS
1	New Zealand	Ali Forsyth, Blake Signal, Michael Nagy, Paul Girdler	4	4	0	0	73	37	36	12
2	Wales	Jonathan Tomlinson, Marc Wyatt, Ross Owen, Steve Harris	4	3	0	1	60	35	25	9
3	Canada	Cam Lefresne, Chris Stadnyk, Greg Wilson, Ryan Stadnyk	4	2	0	2	61	73	-12	6
4	Papua New Guinea	Fred Koesan, Gabriel Tika, Manu Walo, Polin Pomaleu	4	0	1	3	53	66	-13	1
5	Cook Islands	Adoni Wichman-Rairoa, Aidan Zittersteijn, Lawrence Paniani, Munokokura Pita	4	0	1	3	34	70	-36	1

	New Zealand	Wales	Canada	Papua New Guinea	Cook Islands
New Zealand	—	11–10	21–11	20–12	21–4
Wales	10–11	—	23–10	13–10	14–4
Canada	11–21	10–23	—	19–17	21–12
Papua New Guinea	12–20	10–13	17–19	—	14–14
Cook Islands	4–21	4–14	12–21	14–14	—

=== Section B ===
Rank	Nation	Athletes	MP	MW	MT	ML	FR	AG	PD	PTS
1	India	Alok Lakra, Chandan Singh, Dinesh Kumar, Sunil Bahadur	4	4	0	0	79	38	41	12
2	Australia	Aron Sherriff, Barrie Lester, Brett Wilkie, Nathan Rice	4	3	0	1	87	40	47	9
3	South Africa	Gerry Baker, Jason Evans, Morgan Muvhango, Rudi Jacobs	4	2	0	2	60	59	1	6
4	Norfolk Island	Hadyn Evans, John Christian, Ryan Dixon, Timothy Sheridan	4	1	0	3	35	82	-47	3
5	Botswana	Edwin Nyoka, Kabo Gaboutloeloe, Kitso Robert, Nixon Senna	4	0	0	4	28	70	-42	0

	India	Australia	South Africa	Norfolk Island	Botswana
India	—	19–15	19–7	25–7	16–9
Australia	15–19	—	27–6	24–10	21–5
South Africa	7–19	6–27	—	25–7	22–6
Norfolk Island	7–25	10–24	7–25	—	11–8
Botswana	9–16	5–21	6–22	8–11	—

=== Section C ===
Rank	Nation	Athletes	MP	MW	MT	ML	FR	AG	PD	PTS
1	Northern Ireland	Andrew Kyle, Ian McClure, Martin McHugh, Simon Martin	4	4	0	0	79	33	46	12
2	Malaysia	Fairul Izwan, Syamil Syazwan Ramli, Muhammad Hizlee, Zulhilmie Redzuan	4	3	0	1	71	40	31	9
3	Fiji	David Aitcheson, Kushal Pillay, Rajnesh Prasad, Semesa Naiseruvati	4	2	0	2	47	62	-15	6
4	Namibia	Carel Olivier, Douw Calitz, Graham Snyman, Willem Esterhuizen	4	1	0	3	49	58	-9	3
5	Niue	Des Hipa, Hala Funaki, Keith Papani, Mark Blumsky	4	0	0	4	35	88	-53	0

	Northern Ireland	Malaysia	Fiji	Namibia	Niue
Northern Ireland	—	17–8	24–4	17–11	21–10
Malaysia	8–17	—	18–9	14–11	31–3
Fiji	4–24	9–18	—	14–11	20–9
Namibia	11–17	11–14	11–14	—	16–13
Niue	10–21	3–31	9–20	13–16	—

=== Section D ===
Rank	Nation	Athletes	MP	MW	MT	ML	FR	AG	PD	PTS
1	Scotland	Alex Marshall, Derek Oliver, Paul Foster, Ronnie Duncan	3	3	0	0	66	22	44	9
2	England	David Bolt, Jamie Chestney, Louis Ridout, Sam Tolchard	3	2	0	1	51	22	29	6
3	Brunei	Ampuan Ahad, Haji Naim Brahim, Mohd Israt, Pengiran Haji Tengah	3	1	0	2	24	52	-28	3
4	Singapore	Anthony Loh, Foo Meng Yin, Melvin Tan, Pang Heng Heck	3	0	0	3	20	65	-45	0

	Scotland	England	Brunei	Singapore
Scotland	—	12–8	25–9	29–5
England	8–12	—	18–4	25–6
Brunei	9–25	4–18	—	11–9
Singapore	5–29	6–25	9–11	—

== Knockout stage ==
Quarterfinals
A1	New Zealand	2
D2	England	20
D1	Scotland	13
C2	Malaysia	12
B1	India	15
A2	Wales	17
C1	Northern Ireland	9
B2	Australia	13

Semifinals
D2	England	10
D1	Scotland	18
A2	Wales	5
B2	Australia	15

Finals
D1	Scotland	15
B2	Australia	13
Third place
D2	England	15
A2	Wales	9
