= Dave Crocker (lawn bowler) =

British lawn bowler

David Crocker
Personal information
- Nationality: British (English)
- Born: 29 January 1938 Stepney, London
- Died: November 1998 (aged 60) Tunbridge Wells, Kent, England

Sport
- Sport: Lawn and indoor bowls
- Club: Livesey Memorial BC
Medal record
Representing England
British Isles Championships
Gold medal – first place	1972	pairs

David Crocker (1938–1998) was an England international lawn bowler.

== Bowls career ==
He became a national champion after winning the 1971 National pairs title with Denis Cross. During 1971 he also won the Kent singles, pairs and triples.

The following year he won the British Isles pairs and was capped by England for the first time. Also during the indoor season of 1972 he won the EIBA and British Isles pairs.

He represented England at the 1974 British Commonwealth Games in the fours event, at the 1974 British Commonwealth Games in Christchurch, New Zealand.

== Personal life ==
He was the manager of a gas board conversion unit and first played bowls for the Metrogas Bowls Club in 1961.
