= Grant Burgess =

English lawn bowler

Personal information
- Nationality: British (English)
- Born: 1960 (age 65–66) Kidderminster, Worcestershire, England

Sport
- Club: Chester Road BC
Medal record
Representing England
Men's lawn bowls
English Nationals
Gold medal – first place	1987	triples
Gold medal – first place	1998	singles
Gold medal – first place	2016	senior singles
Gold medal – first place	2021	senior singles

Grant Burgess (born 1960) is a male English international lawn bowler.

== Bowls career ==
Burgess came to prominence in 1987 when he won his first National title. He was bowling for the Worcester County Ground Bowls Club and the triples team of Burgess, Mark Weaver and John Weaver won the title.

His most successful year was in 1998, bowling for the Gilt Edge Bowls Club of Worcestershire he won the prestigious singles title at the National Championships. This second National title earned a call up to represent England in the fours event, at the 1998 Commonwealth Games in Kuala Lumpur, Malaysia. The team of Burgess, Brett Morley, John Bell and Andy Thomson finished 3rd in their group, which meant that they just missed out on a bronze medal.

In 2006, he reached his 21st county championship final and continued to participate in the senior events of competitions and reached the final of the National senior fours in 2019 bowling for Chester Road.

In 2016 and 2021, he won the men's senior singles to claim his third and fourth National titles (bowling for Chester Road), the latter 34 years after his first in 1987.
