= Edward Morris (bowls) =

English bowls player

Ed Morris
Personal information
- Nationality: British (English)
- Born: 1988 (age 37–38)

Sport
- Sport: Lawn bowls
- Club: Essex County BC

Achievements and titles
- Highest world ranking: 17 (June 2024)
Medal record
Representing England
Men's lawn bowls
European Championships
Gold medal – first place	2022 Ayr	pairs
British Isles Championships
Gold medal – first place	2022	Singles
Gold medal – first place	2022	Triples
Gold medal – first place	2023	Singles
English Nationals
Gold medal – first place	2018	Singles 2w
Gold medal – first place	2019, 2022	Singles 4w
Gold medal – first place	2021	Triples
Gold medal – first place	2025	CofC
Gold medal – first place	2026	Mixed pairs

Edward Morris also known as Ed Morris (born 1988) is an English male lawn bowler. He is a two times British champion and four times English champion and bowls for the Essex County Bowling Club.

== Bowls career ==
Morris became the English champion when he won the two wood singles tournament, during the 2018 National Championships. He won a second National title during the 2019 Championships, when he won the singles title.

In 2021, he won a his third title during the 2021 Bowls England National Finals, when he won the triples with Christopher Muir and Steve Gunnell. Several days later he finished runner-up to Sam Tolchard in the two wood singles.

In July 2022, he represented England in the British Isles Bowls Championships held at Llandrindod Wells Bowling Club in both the singles and triples (with Christopher Muir and Steve Gunnell) going on to win both titles. Just two months later he won a fourth national title when sealing victory in the singles once again at the 2022 Bowls England National Finals. He also won the pairs gold at the European Bowls Championships.

In 2023, he won the singles title at the British Isles Bowls Championships, held in Ayr. He was only the second player in the history of the competition to successfully defend his title. Later in 2023, he was selected as part of the team to represent England at the 2023 World Outdoor Bowls Championship. He participated in the men's pairs and the men's fours events.

In 2025, Morris won the champion of champions at the 2025 nationals.
