= Pip Branfield =

British lawn bowler

Personal information
- Nationality: British (English)
- Born: 1952 (age 73–74) Bristol, England

Sport
- Sport: Lawn bowls
- Club: Clevedon BC
Medal record
Representing England
British Isles Championships
Gold medal – first place	1985	triples

Philip 'Pip' J Branfield (born 1952) is a former English international lawn bowler.

== Bowls career ==
Branfield became a National champion in 1984 when he won the national Championship triples for Clevedon and Somerset. The winning team consisted of his father Len Branfield and Gordon James. A second national title arrived 24 years later when he was part of the fours team that won the 2008 National title; remarkably the team included his son James Branfield in addition to Darren Mason and John Hick, which meant he had been a National champion with both his father and son.

He was an England international from 1979 until 1991.

He was selected for England at the 1986 Commonwealth Games in the fours, at the 1986 Commonwealth Games in Edinburgh, Scotland and was a team manager for the 2010 Commonwealth Games.

== Family ==
His daughter is England international bowler Stef Branfield.
