= Edwin Percy Baker =

English bowls player

Percy Baker
Personal information
- Nationality: British (English)
- Born: 19 July 1895 Weston-super-Mare, England
- Died: 3 January 1990 (aged 94) Poole, England

Sport
- Club: Poole Park, Dorset (outdoors); Bournemouth (indoors)
Medal record
Representing (England)
Commonwealth Games
Silver medal – second place	1958 Cardiff	singles
British Isles Championships
Gold medal – first place	1963	pairs

Edwin 'Percy' Baker (1895–1990), was a lawn and indoor bowler. Throughout his career he was known as Percy Baker. Baker was regarded as the greatest English bowler until his records were broken by David Bryant.

== Biography ==
Born at Weston-Super-Mare in Somerset he was a photographer by trade but was persuaded to take up bowling in 1921. He joined the Poole Park Bowling Club and was to win their club singles 22 times. He won 11 county singles over a 37-year period and led Dorset in the Middleton Cup from 1927 until 1969.

He won four English National Singles titles in 1932, 1946, 1952 & 1955, setting a record at the time. He also won two pairs (1950 & 1962) and a triples (1960) at the National Bowls Championships.

Capped by England in 1933, it was not until 1949 that he established his place and captained England from 1950. After suffering a serious illness he recovered in time to represent England in the 1958 British Empire and Commonwealth Games where he won a silver medal in the singles.

Notably, Baker achieved victory in the Bournemouth Open pairs tournament at the age of 76 in 1971 before concluding his illustrious career due to declining vision. He died in a Poole hospital on 3 January 1990, at the age of 94. His legacy extended to his son, Cecil Baker, who also engaged in lawn bowls and represented the Ryde club at the Nationals.
