= Harold Shapland =

English lawn bowler

Personal information
- Nationality: British (English)
- Born: 6 October 1900 Morchard Bishop, Devon, England
- Died: 6 July 1977 (aged 76) Plymouth, Devon, England

Sport
- Club: Tiverton BC

Frederick Shapland (6 October 1900 – 6 July 1977), also known as Harold Shapland, was an England international lawn bowler.

== Bowls career ==
Shapland made his England international debut in 1950.

He competed for the England team in the pairs at the 1958 British Empire and Commonwealth Games in Cardiff with Fred Horn, where they finished in sixth place. He was an English international from 1950-1958.

In 1948, he won the national pairs title, bowling with Reg Grater for the Tiverton Boro club.

== Bowls official ==
He was President of the English Bowling Association in 1959.

== Personal life ==
He was a farmer and company director by trade and Chairman of the British Wool Marketing Board. In 1952 he became Mayor of Tiverton and repeated the role in 1953 and 1971. His son Eric was a third successive generation to be mayor in 1973.
