= John Rednall =

British lawn bowler (born 1964)

Personal information
- Nationality: British (English)
- Born: 26 February 1964 Ipswich, Suffolk, England

Sport
- Club: Felixstowe and Suffolk
Medal record
Representing England
World Outdoor Championships
Bronze medal – third place	2004 Ayr	Men's fours
British Isles Championships
Gold medal – first place	2004	pairs

John Rednall (born 1964) is a former international lawn bowler and indoor bowls player from England. He announced his retirement from international bowls in May 2022 and earned over 100 caps for England.

== Bowls career ==
=== World Outdoor Championships ===
Rednall won a bronze medal in the men's fours at the 2004 World Outdoor Bowls Championship in Ayr.

=== Commonwealth Games ===
He represented England at the 1994 Commonwealth Games in the fours event, at the 1994 Commonwealth Games in Victoria, British Columbia, Canada.

=== National ===
He was the 2003 National Champion in the pairs and subsequently won the British Isles Pairs in 2004. He is also an English national junior and British junior champion, National Champion of Champions, twice been a National Top Club champion, National Two Fours champion and National Top Four winner for Suffolk. He is also an indoor bowls player and won the EIBA National Singles in 2004.

== Personal life ==
He is the director of the Felixstowe and Suffolk Bowling Club. His daughter Katherine Rednall is an indoor world champion.
