= Martyn Sekjer =

British lawn bowler

Personal information
- Born: 1957 (age 68–69) Dartford, England

Sport
- Sport: Lawn bowls
- Club: Maidstone BC; Blackheath & Greenwich BC; Southampton BC
Medal record
Representing England
British Isles Championships
Gold medal – first place	1990	fours

Martyn Sekjer (born 1957) is a former English international lawn bowler and an international selector.

== Bowls career ==
Sekjer became a National champion in 1989 when he won the national Championship fours for Kent and Blackheath & Greenwich.

Thirteen years later he became the English singles champion when he won the 2002 Championship.

He was selected for England at the 1986 Commonwealth Games in the fours, at the 1986 Commonwealth Games in Edinburgh, Scotland

== Bowls management ==
He is an EIBA selector for the England indoor international team.

== Personal life ==
He is a company director by trade.
