= Mark Walton (bowls) =

English bowls player (born 1966)

Personal information
- Nationality: British (English)
- Born: 1966 (age 59–60) Yorkshire, England

Sport
- Sport: Lawn bowls
- Club: Nafferton BC (outdoors)
Medal record
Representing England
World Singles Champion of Champions
Gold medal – first place	2005 New Zealand	Men's Singles
British Isles Championships
Gold medal – first place	2005	triples

Mark Walton (born 1966) is an English international lawn bowler.

== Bowls career ==
Walton won three English National titles in 2004 and 2006 representing the Nafferton Bowls Club and Yorkshire. By winning the National singles title he represented England at the World Singles Champion of Champions event and won the 2005 gold medal in Christchurch, New Zealand defeating Dwayne Cameron of New Zealand in the final. In 2007, he lost in the final of the national singles to Andrew Squire.

In 2004 and 2008, he won the Hong Kong International Bowls Classic singles and pairs titles. In between in 2005, Walton won the mixed pairs title with Michelle Roberts at the IIBC Championships.
