= Sam Tolchard =

English bowls player (born 1989)

Personal information
- Nationality: British (English)
- Born: 27 May 1989 (age 37) Torquay, England

Sport
- Sport: Bowls
- Club: Torquay Utd (indoors); Kings BC (outdoors)

Achievements and titles
- Highest world ranking: 8 (August 2026)
Medal record
Representing England
Men's lawn bowls
Commonwealth Games
Gold medal – first place	2026 Glasgow	singles
Silver medal – second place	2022 Birmingham	pairs
Bronze medal – third place	2014 Glasgow	pairs
Bronze medal – third place	2018 Gold Coast	fours
Bronze medal – third place	2022 Birmingham	fours
Bowls World Cup
Gold medal – first place	2025 Kuala Lumpur	singles
World Champion of Champions
Gold medal – first place	2022 Wellington	singles
Atlantic Bowls Championships
Silver medal – second place	2009 Johannesburg	singles
Silver medal – second place	2009 Johannesburg	triples
Bronze medal – third place	2019 Cardiff	triples
Hong Kong International Bowls Classic
Gold medal – first place	2010	pairs
British Isles Championships
Gold medal – first place	2017	pairs

Sam Tolchard (born 27 May 1989) is an English international lawn and indoor bowler. He reached a career high ranking of world number 8 in August 2026.

== Profile ==
In 2009, he won the singles and triples silver medals at the Atlantic Bowls Championships and the following year in 2010, he won the Hong Kong International Bowls Classic pairs title with Robert Newman.

He competed for England in the men's pairs at the 2014 Commonwealth Games where he won a bronze medal.

He was selected as part of the English team for the 2018 Commonwealth Games on the Gold Coast in Queensland where he claimed a bronze medal in the Fours with David Bolt, Jamie Chestney and Louis Ridout.

In 2019, he won the triples bronze medal at the Atlantic Bowls Championships and in 2020, he was selected for the 2020 World Outdoor Bowls Championship in Australia but the event was cancelled due to the COVID-19 pandemic. In 2022, he competed in the men's pairs and the men's fours at the 2022 Commonwealth Games. Partnering Jamie Walker he won the pairs silver medal, losing out to Wales in the final and in the fours he also secured a bronze medal.

In November 2022, he won the gold medal at the World Singles Champion of Champions in Wellington, New Zealand.

In 2023, he was selected as part of the team to represent England at the 2023 World Outdoor Bowls Championship. He participated in the men's singles and the men's pairs events. In the singles, he won his group undefeated but then lost to Iain McLean at the quarter final stage.

In November 2025, he won the singles gold medal at the 2025 Bowls World Cup, defeating Dinesh Kumar in the final.

Tolchard won the gold medal in the men's singles at the 2026 Commonwealth Games in Glasgow, defeating Izzat Dzulkeple of Malaysia in the final.

== National achievements ==
He has won nine National Championship titles, including six singles titles. He bowls outdoors for Kings BC, who have won the Top Club championship four years running from 2016 to 2019.

=== National titles ===
- 2007 Bowls England National Championships (Men's Champion of Champions)
- 2008 Bowls England National Championships (Men's Singles Four Wood)
- 2016 Bowls England National Championships (men's pairs)
- 2016 Bowls England National Championships (Men's Singles Two Wood)
- 2019 Bowls England National Championships (Men's Champion of Champions)
- 2021 Bowls England National Championships (Men's Singles Four Wood)
- 2021 Bowls England National Championships (Men's Singles Two Wood)
- 2022 Bowls England National Championships (Men's Singles Two Wood)
- 2025 Bowls England National Championships (men's pairs)

== Personal life and family ==
Tolchard is the brother of England international bowler Sophie Tolchard. His father, Ray Tolchard, played cricket for Devon and was a first-class cricket umpire, and his uncle Roger Tolchard played Test cricket for England and county cricket for Leicestershire. Another uncle, Jeffrey Tolchard, also played cricket for Leicestershire and played football for Torquay United and Exeter City.
