= Chris Gale (bowls) =

English bowls player (born 1983)

Personal information
- Nationality: England
- Born: 1983

Sport
- Sport: Lawn / indoor bowls
- Club: Manchester Heaton Hall (outdoors); Blackpool Newton Hall (indoors)

Chris Gale (born 1983) is an English male lawn and indoor bowler.

== Bowls career ==
He is an England international and was the National junior singles runner-up in 2002 and pairs runner-up in 2000 during the Men's National Championships.

He was world ranked 26 in 2017 and bowls outdoors for Manchester Heaton Hall and indoors for Blackpool Newton Hall.

He won the National Championship triples in 2018 and was part of the fours team who finished runner-up.
