= Sanatogen =

Fortified wine and former patent medicine

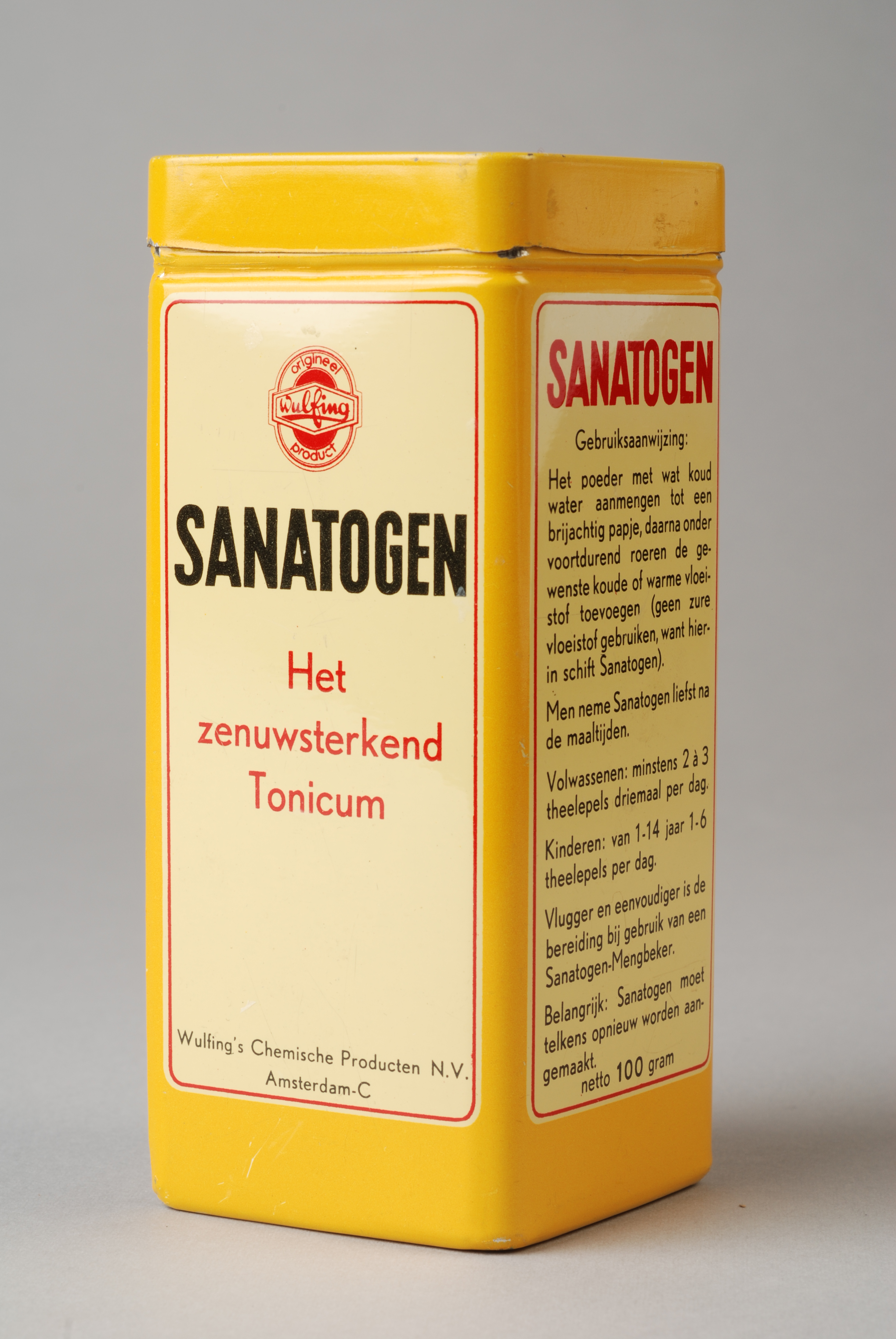
- Product type: Patent medicine
- Current owner: Bauer
- Country: Germany

Sanatogen was a "brain tonic" invented by the Bauer Chemical Company in Germany in 1898 and sold worldwide.

In the US it was advertised as a "nerve revitaliser". The medicine was prohibited in Australia in 1915 during World War I and a British-made substitute "Sanagen" was introduced to the Australian market the following year, claiming to be "identical to Sanatogen". The product became fashionable in China in the early 20th century and won the favour of many renowned people.

The indications or uses for this product provided by the manufacturer were: "Food tonic. A concentrated nutrient with tonic properties... easily digested and absorbed and is recommended as an effective means of reinforcing the daily diet of anaemic and convalescent patients."

== Product information ==
The ingredients have been described as:

- pure milk protein – 95% (drug active ingredients)
- sodium glycerophosphate – 5% (drug active ingredients)

== Marketing ==
The product was marketed extensively in Europe and the US with such slogans as "Endorsed by over 20,000 Physicians".

== Court case ==
In 1913 the product was at the centre of a United States Supreme Court case: Bauer & Cie. v. O'Donnell. The product was also the subject of intellectual property litigation worldwide.

== Other products ==
The Sanatogen brand persists in the UK as a fortified wine, with an alcohol content of 15%.

Sanatogen is also the name of a modern multivitamin product manufactured by Fisons before being sold to Roche, and later Bayer.
