= Louis Ridout =

English bowls player (born 1990)

Personal information
- Nationality: British (English)
- Born: 24 January 1990 (age 36) Taunton, England

Sport
- Sport: Bowls
- Club: Kings (Torquay)

Achievements and titles
- Highest world ranking: 17 (August 2024)
Medal record
Men's lawn bowls
Representing England
World Outdoor Championships
Bronze medal – third place	2023 Gold Coast	triples
Commonwealth Games
Bronze medal – third place	2018 Gold Coast	fours
Gold medal – first place	2022 Birmingham	triples
Bronze medal – third place	2022 Birmingham	fours
Atlantic Bowls Championships
Bronze medal – third place	2015 Paphos	pairs
British Isles Championships
Gold medal – first place	2019	singles
Gold medal – first place	2017	pairs

Louis Ridout (born 24 January 1990) is an English international indoor and outdoor bowls player. He reached a career high ranking of world number 17 in August 2024.

== Bowls career ==
In 2015 he won the pairs bronze medal at the Atlantic Bowls Championships.

In 2016 he won the National title in the Pairs with Sam Tolchard. The bowler who represents Devon represented England during the 2016 World Outdoor Bowls Championship.

He was selected as part of the English team for the 2018 Commonwealth Games on the Gold Coast in Queensland where he claimed a bronze medal in the Fours with David Bolt, Jamie Chestney and Sam Tolchard.

He was crowned National singles champion in August 2018 after defeating Andrew Squire 21–16 in the final. He subsequently became the British singles champion after winning the British Isles Bowls Championships the following year. He bowls for Kings BC, who have won the Top Club championship four years running from 2016 to 2019.

In 2022, he competed in the men's triples and the men's fours at the 2022 Commonwealth Games. The team of Ridout, Nick Brett and Jamie Chestney won the triples gold medal and in the fours he also secured a bronze medal.

In 2023, he was selected as part of the team to represent England at the 2023 World Outdoor Bowls Championship. He participated in the men's triples and the men's fours events. In the triples with Nick Brett and Jamie Walker, he won the bronze medal.
