= Beach House Park, Worthing =

Formal garden in Worthing, England

Beach House Park
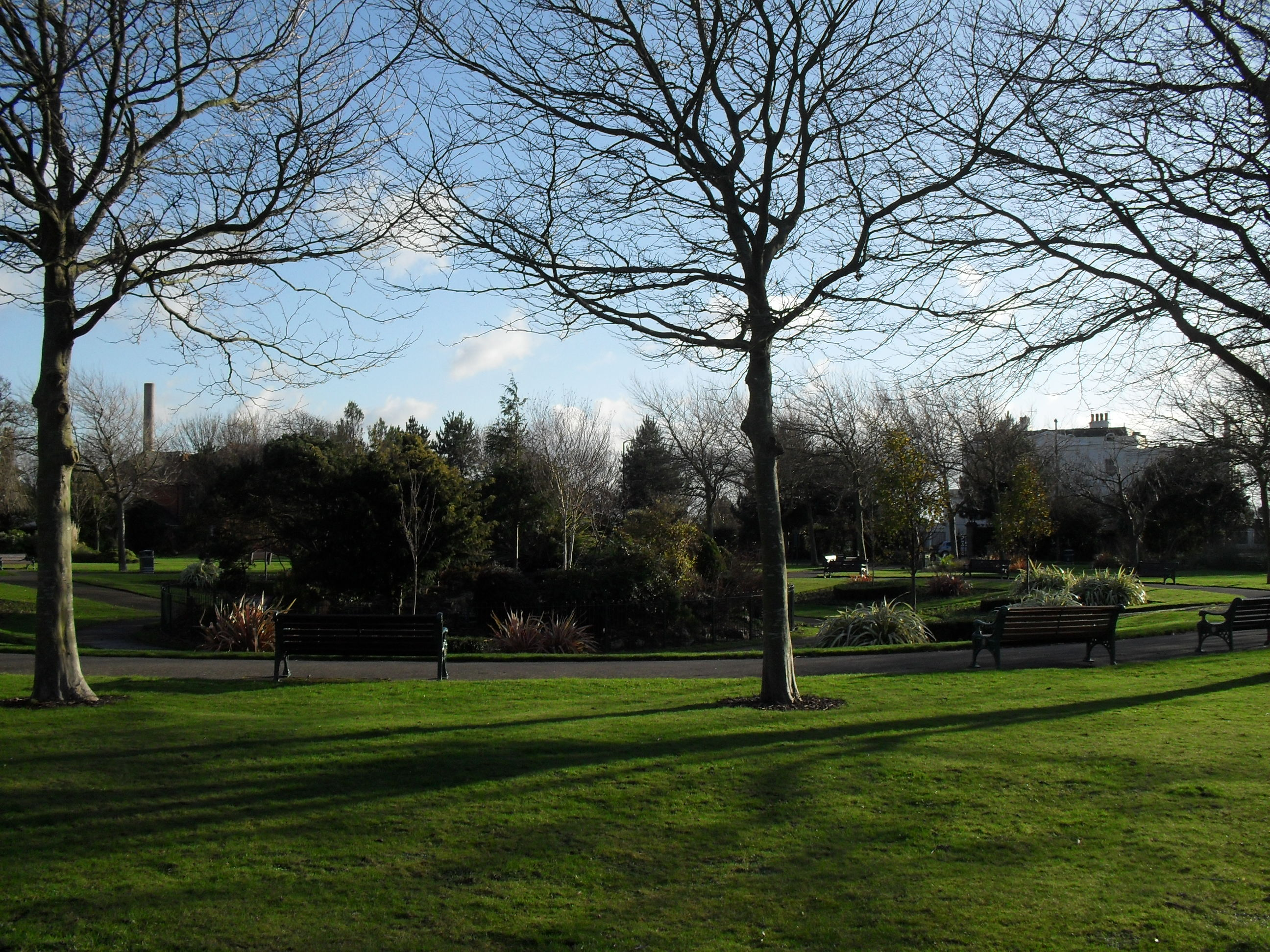
- Looking southwest towards the war pigeon memorial, with Beach House in the background
- Interactive map of Beach House Park
- Type: Public gardens
- Location: Worthing, West Sussex, England
- Coordinates: 50.8136°N 0.3633°W
- Area: 9.57 acres (3.87 ha)
- Created: 1924
- Operator: Worthing Borough Council
- Open: All year

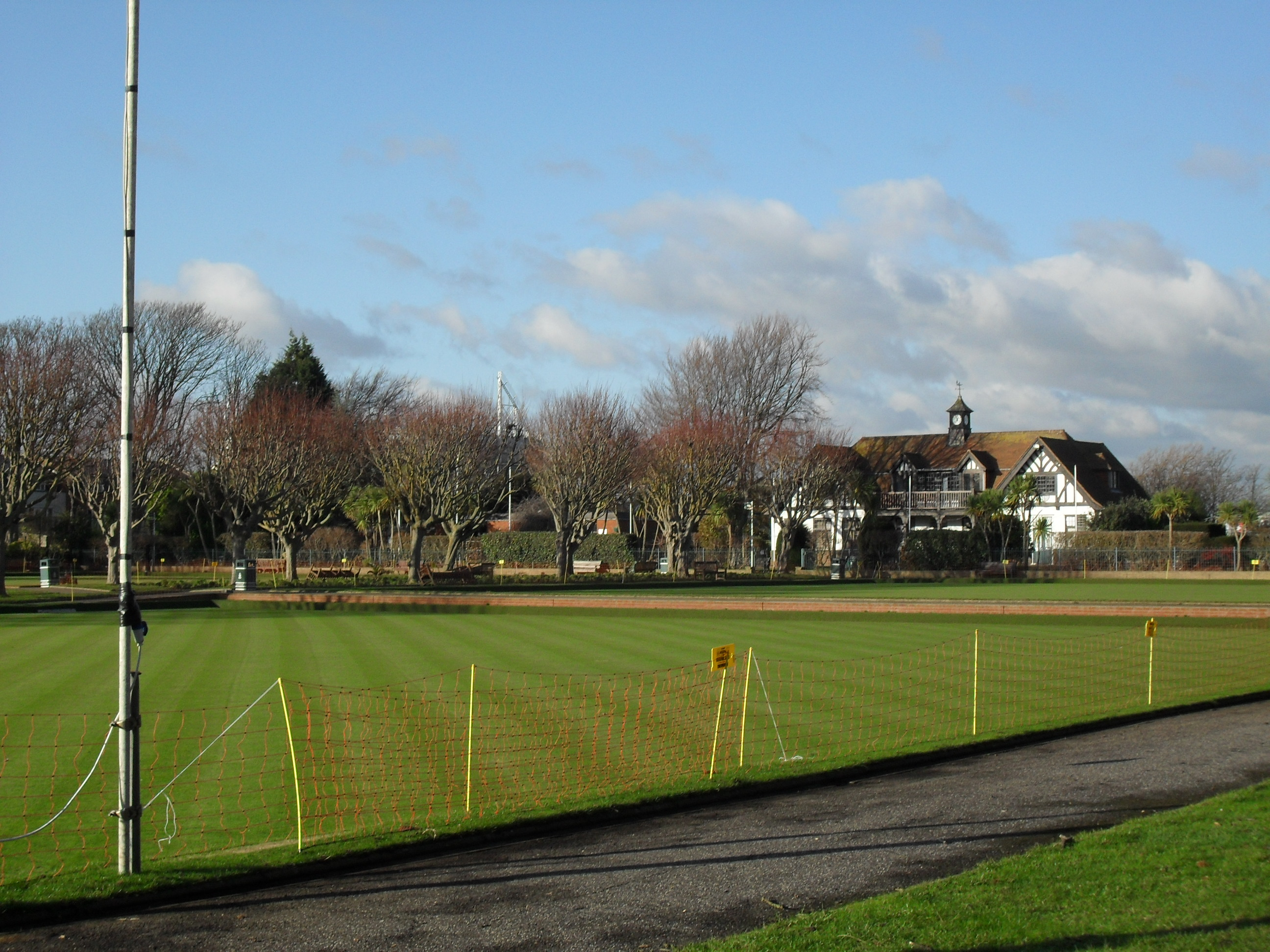
The north side of the park has bowling greens and pavilions.

Beach House Park is a formal garden in Worthing, a town and local government district in West Sussex, England. Opened by Worthing Borough Council in 1924, the 9.57-acre (3.87 ha) park has formal lawns and flowerbeds, bowling greens of international standard, and a war memorial commemorating war pigeons. A café in the grounds was destroyed by fire in 2009.

== History and facilities ==
Beach House, a Grade II*-listed Regency-style villa, was built in about 1820 by John Rebecca. It faced the beach on the English Channel coast, and its grounds extended northwards as far as the east–west Lyndhurst Road. In December 1922, Worthing Borough Council bought a section of these grounds (covering 9.57 acres (3.87 ha) between Brighton Road to the south and Lyndhurst Road to the north) for the benefit of the public. Formal gardens were laid out, and the park opened in early 1924.

The south (Brighton Road) end of the park is planted with shrubs, flowers and trees, while the northern section is given over to bowling greens, tennis courts and associated buildings. Trees run down the eastern and western boundaries, and surround the war pigeon memorial in the centre. The London plane tree (Platanus × hispanica) is the predominant species; many were planted in 1992. There are also Cappadocian Maples (Acer cappadocicum). A herbaceous border runs along the north side of the formal gardens, separating them from the bowling greens. Formal flowerbeds line the pathways in the ornamental gardens and the central pathway from there through the bowling greens.

The park originally had two bowling greens. More were laid out in 1926, 1934 and 1967. Three tennis courts, toilets, a park attendant's office, changing rooms and extra-large outdoor chessboards are also available.

For many years, there was a café in the park. In July 2009, it was severely damaged in an arson attack, but reopened—only to be destroyed by another fire three months later.

== Bowls ==
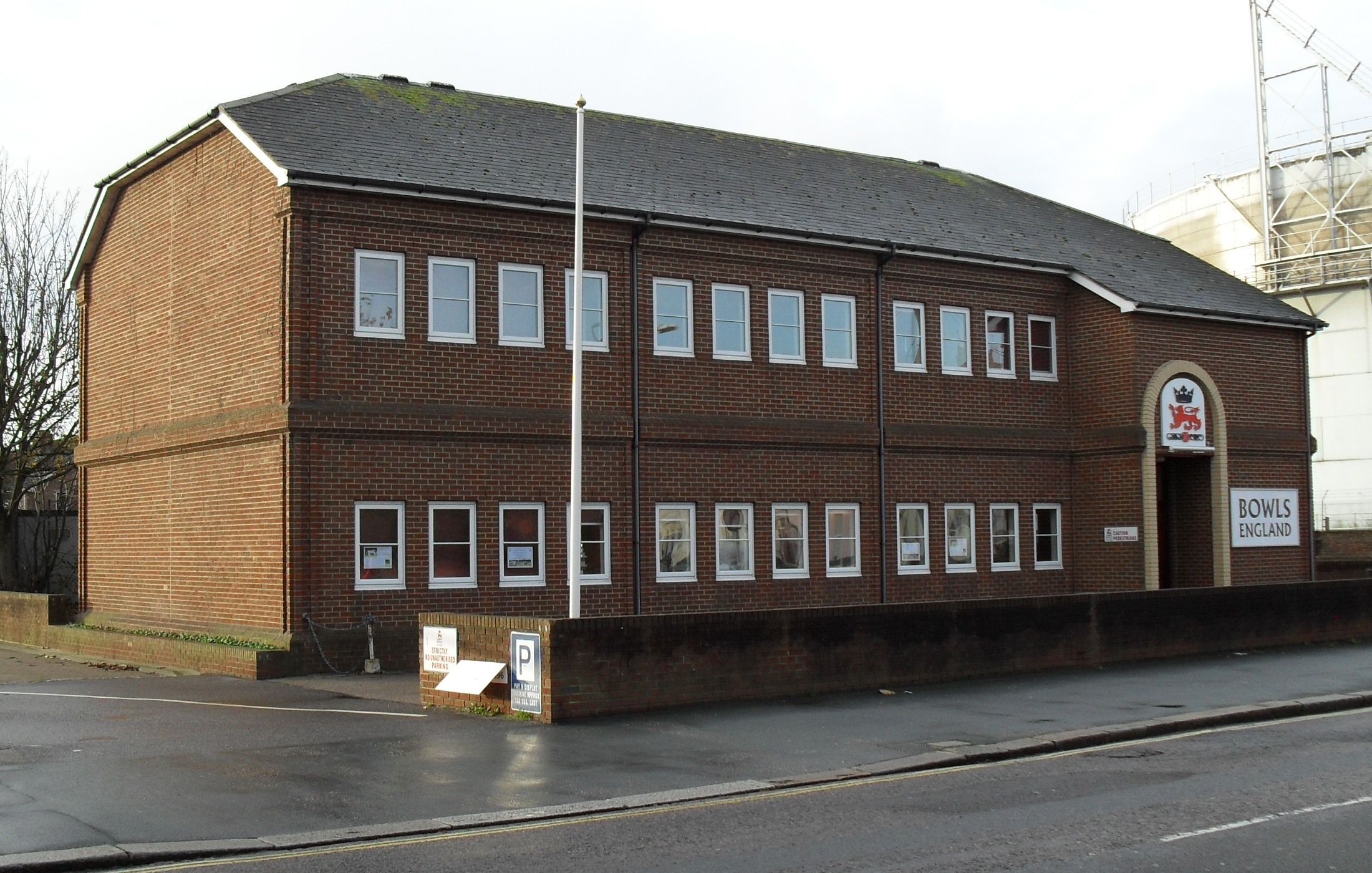
Bowls England's former headquarters face Lyndhurst Road.

Worthing Bowling Club was established in 1907 and was originally based at Homefield Park—the site of the town's only bowling green. In 1924, when Beach House Park's first two greens opened, the club moved there. By 1938, eight clubs had been founded in the park, and a pavilion had been built. In 1972, the second men's Bowls World Championship was staged at Beach House Park, at which time another pavilion was added. Five years later, the third women's World Championship was also held, and in 1979 the Masters Tournament took place. The men's World Championship returned in 1992. All five greens have automatic irrigation facilities. As of 2010, four clubs are based at the park.

Bowls England, formerly the English Bowls Association, moved to the park in 1987 when it built its headquarters on the Lyndhurst Road side. Each summer, it organises the National Championships—an event which has taken place at Beach House Park every year since 1974.

== Pigeon memorial ==
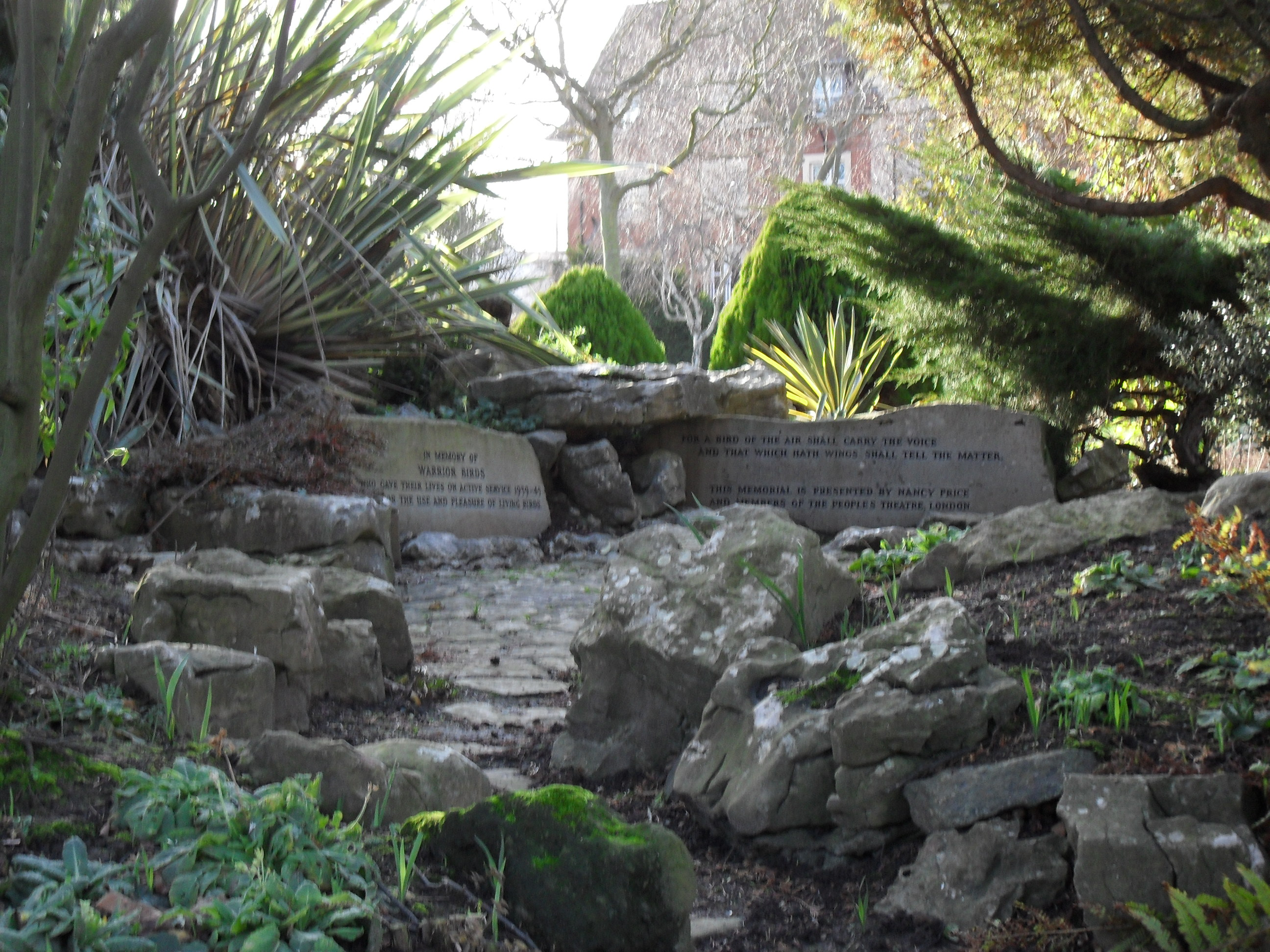
The war pigeon memorial was sculpted in 1949 and unveiled two years later.

In the centre of the formal gardens, there is a memorial to war pigeons: birds used during World War II to carry messages, explosives and other items, in some cases on secret missions. Described as "splendidly conceived and charming", it is thought to be the only such memorial in Britain. The "Warrior Birds" memorial was promoted and commissioned by actress Nancy Price and members of the People's Theatre in London. Local sculptor Leslie Sharp started work on the memorial in 1949, and it was unveiled on 27 July 1951 by the Duke and Duchess of Hamilton.

As originally designed, the memorial consisted of a circular mound planted with shrubs and a rockery with streams and pools of water, two boulders with carved wording, and two stone pigeons. The pigeon sculptures have since been stolen and not replaced, and a fence has been added around the mound. One stone bears the words in memory of warrior birds who gave their lives on active service 1939–45 and for the use and pleasure of living birds; the other reads a bird of the air shall carry the voice and that which hath wings shall tell the matter. this memorial is presented by nancy price and members of the people's theatre, london. The line A bird of the air shall carry the voice and that which hath wings shall tell the matter is a quote from the Book of Ecclesiastes in the Old Testament (Eccl 10:20). A metal panel next to the entrance gate in the fence repeats most of the details from the first stone. The stones, which were quarried in the Forest of Dean, were refurbished and repainted in 1999, and Worthing Borough Council continues to maintain the memorial.
