= David Bryant (bowls) =

British bowls champion (1931–2020)

David Bryant CBE
Personal information
- Nationality: British (English)
- Born: 27 October 1931 Clevedon, North Somerset, England
- Died: 27 August 2020 (aged 88)

Sport
- Sport: Bowls
- Club: Clevedon BC
Medal record
Representing England
Men's Bowls
World Outdoor Bowls Championships
Gold medal – first place	1966 Kyeemagh	Singles
Bronze medal – third place	1966 Kyeemagh	Pairs
Bronze medal – third place	1966 Kyeemagh	Team
Bronze medal – third place	1976 Johannesburg	Singles
Silver medal – second place	1976 Johannesburg	Triples
Silver medal – second place	1976 Johannesburg	Team
Gold medal – first place	1980 Frankston	Singles
Gold medal – first place	1980 Frankston	Triples
Gold medal – first place	1980 Frankston	Team
Bronze medal – third place	1984 Aberdeen	Singles
Silver medal – second place	1984 Aberdeen	Pairs
Bronze medal – third place	1984 Aberdeen	Team
Gold medal – first place	1988 Auckland	Singles
Silver medal – second place	1988 Auckland	Pairs
Gold medal – first place	1988 Auckland	Team
Commonwealth Games
Gold medal – first place	1962 Perth	Singles
Gold medal – first place	1962 Perth	Fours
Gold medal – first place	1970 Edinburgh	Singles
Gold medal – first place	1974 Christchurch	Singles
Gold medal – first place	1978 Edmonton	Singles
World Indoor Bowls Championships
Gold medal – first place	1979 Coatbridge	Singles
Gold medal – first place	1980 Coatbridge	Singles
Gold medal – first place	1981 Coatbridge	Singles
Gold medal – first place	1986 Bournemouth	Pairs
Silver medal – second place	1987 Coatbridge	Singles
Gold medal – first place	1987 Bournemouth	Pairs
Gold medal – first place	1989 Preston	Pairs
Gold medal – first place	1990 Preston	Pairs
Gold medal – first place	1991 Preston	Pairs
Gold medal – first place	1992 Preston	Pairs
Silver medal – second place	1993 Preston	Pairs
Silver medal – second place	1995 Preston	Pairs
British Isles Championships
Gold medal – first place	1961	singles
Gold medal – first place	1972	singles
Gold medal – first place	1973	singles
Gold medal – first place	1974	singles
Gold medal – first place	1966	pairs
Gold medal – first place	1975	pairs
Gold medal – first place	1986	triples
Gold medal – first place	1970	fours
Gold medal – first place	1972	fours

David John Bryant CBE (27 October 1931 – 27 August 2020) was a three-times World (outdoors) singles bowls champion (in 1966, 1980 and 1988), a three-times World indoors singles champion (in 1979, 1980 and 1981) and a four times Commonwealth Games singles gold medallist. He is generally considered to be the greatest bowler of all time, winning 19 World and Commonwealth gold medals in total.

== The beginning ==
Born into a bowling dynasty, his grandfather was a founder member of the Clevedon Bowling Club in Chapel Hill, Clevedon, North Somerset. His father, Reginald Bryant, won three national fours rinks titles. David joined the club when he was 16 and during his first season with the club he won the Clevedon Bowls handicap.

== Bowls career ==
=== World Outdoor Championships ===
He won the inaugural World Outdoor singles title at Kyeemagh in 1966 and went on to win five gold medals (three singles, one triples and one team). He won eleven medals in total (three more silver and three more bronze), from 1966 until 1988.

=== Commonwealth Games ===
Bryant claimed a double gold medal at the 1962 British Empire and Commonwealth Games in Perth in both the singles and fours. This was the catalyst for four singles gold medals and five gold Commonwealth Games gold medals in total. The singles golds were in 1962, 1970, 1974 and 1978. No bowls competition was held at the 1966 Commonwealth Games which arguably stopped Bryant from winning a fifth.

=== World Indoor Championships ===
Bryant also reached legendary status indoors after winning nine World Championships, three in singles and six in the pairs with Tony Allcock.

=== National ===
Bryant also helped his county win the Middleton Cup on numerous occasions, where among his Somerset teammates was former Scottish League international footballer Bobby Black.

In addition to the Middleton Cup victories he was crowned National Champion on 16 occasions for Somerset.

- Singles - 1960, 1966, 1971, 1972, 1973, 1975
- Pairs - 1965, 1969, 1970
- Triples - 1966, 1977, 1985
- Fours - 1957, 1968, 1969, 1971

== Awards ==
In the 1969 New Year Honours, Bryant was appointed a Member of the Order of the British Empire (MBE) for services to bowls. He was promoted to Commander of the Order of the British Empire (CBE) in the 1980 Birthday Honours, again for services to bowls.

== Personal life ==
Bryant was born in Clevedon, North Somerset, on 27 October 1931 and died on 27 August 2020, aged 88. He was famous for smoking a tobacco pipe whilst playing, and in 1986 was honoured with the award for Pipe Smoker of the Year. His father Reginald Bryant won three National fours/rinks titles.

== Bibliography ==
Bryant wrote many books on the subject of bowls, including:

- Bryant on Bowls — Outdoor & Indoor 1966 ISBN 0-304-93687-1
- Bowl with Bryant 1984 ISBN 0-00-218025-1
- The Game of Bowls (co-authored with David Rhys Jones) 1990 ISBN 1-85225-101-8
- Bowl to Win (co-authored with Tony Allcock) 1994 ISBN 0-00-218523-7

== See also ==
- List of Bowls England champions
