= English national bowls championships =

Lawn bowls competitions

English National Bowls Finals
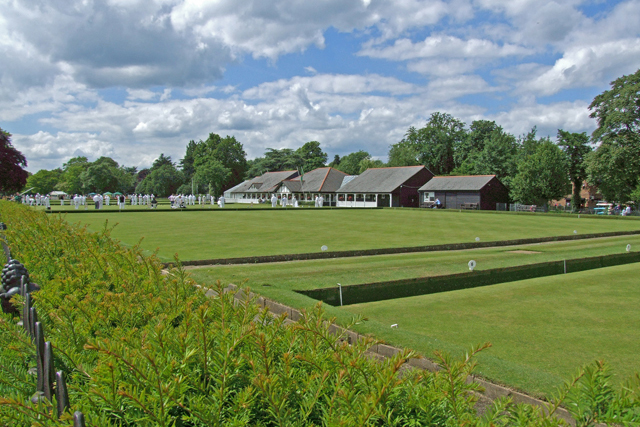
- Victoria Park, Leamington Spa, the current venue of the nationals

Tournament information
- Sport: Lawn bowls
- Location: Royal Leamington Spa, England
- Established: 1905
- Administrator: Bowls England
- Website: Bowls England

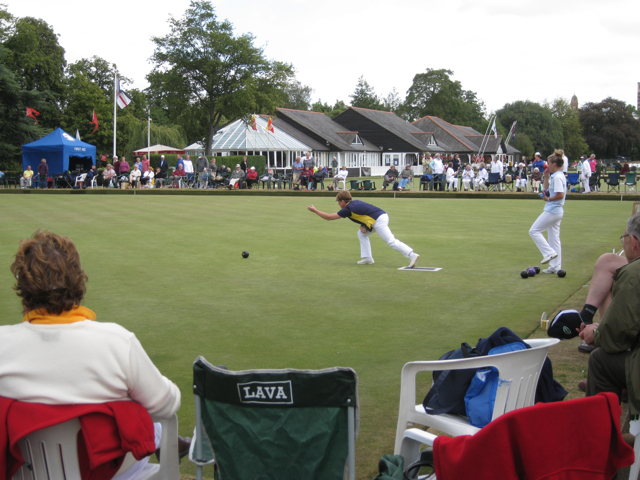
Women's singles match at the 2013 nationals

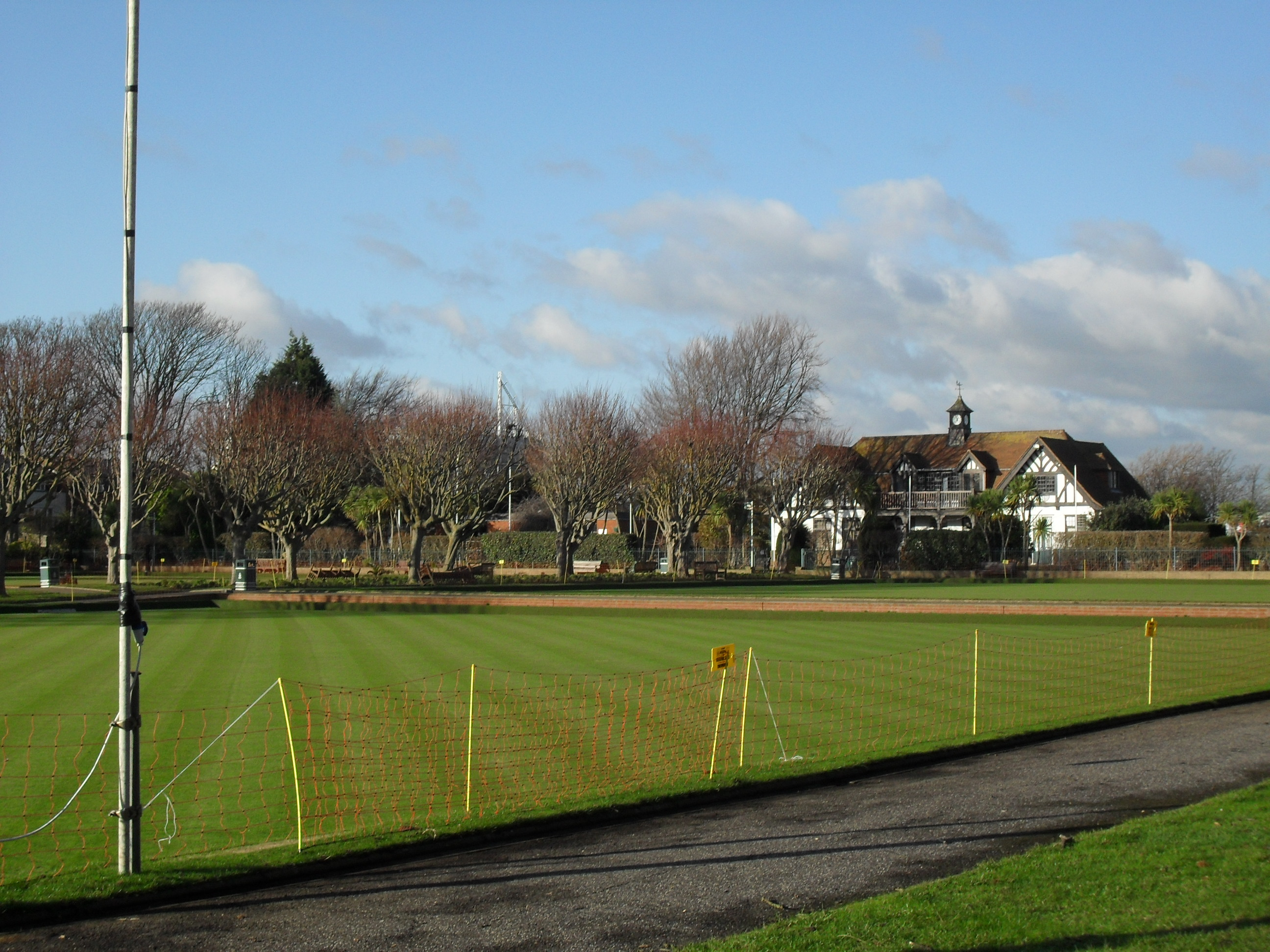
Beach House Park in Worthing, former venue of the men's championships from 1974–2013

The English Bowls Association was the governing body of bowls in England until 2007. From 2008 onwards, Bowls England was formed, which now runs the sport. The national finals for bowls are held annually, where either 1, 2 or 3 representatives from each county compete for the national titles.

Below is a record of all English Bowls Association (EBA) and Bowls England champions. This is a unique record of these champions, as EBA and Bowls England champions will never be recorded together in official handbooks. In addition, only the name of the club of the successful participants has been recorded in the past.

Bowls England was inaugurated after two associations unified to form it, the English Bowling Association (EBA) and the English Women's Bowling Association (EWBA). The events are categorised into national championships and national competitions, with the former being the blue riband events.

The annual championships are currently held at the Royal Leamington Spa Bowling Club in Victoria Park, five minutes walk from the Bowls England headquarters. The 2020 Championships were cancelled due to the COVID-19 pandemic. In 2021, the Championships were streamed live for the first time on YouTube.
