= 2025 Bowls England National Finals =

British lawn bowls event

- Venue: Victoria Park, Leamington Spa
- Location: Royal Leamington Spa; Warwickshire
- Dates: 13 August – 31 August 2025

The 2025 Bowls England National Finals, sponsored by Aviva, are a series of lawn bowls events to determine the National champions of England. The Championships are being held from 13 August to 31 August 2025, at the Royal Leamington Spa Bowls Club in Victoria Park, Leamington Spa. They are organised by Bowls England, and are open to lawn bowlers who qualify via their County Championships.

England international Amy Pharaoh won two national titles in the pairs and triples, in addition to reaching the final of the singles and the mixed pairs. Stef Branfield won her third singles title in five years.

== Results ==
=== Elite events ===
Event	Winner	Runner-up	Score	Ref
men's singles	Isaac Jenner (Appleyard, Kent)	David Forster (Workington, Cumbria)	21–19	
men's 2w singles	Dylan Martin (Garston, Hertfordshire)	Jordan Philpott (Royal Mail Cart, Lincolnshire)	17–12	
men's cofc singles	Edward Morris (Essex County, Essex)	Chris Hanslip (Blossom Way, Lincolnshire)	21–7	
men's pairs	James Hampton; Sam Tolchard (Kings, Devon (South)	Steve Gunnell; Edward Morris (Essex County, Essex)	15–11	
men's triples	Simon Broom; Jamie Chestney; Jamie Walker (Culm Vale, Devon)	Josh Minto; BJ Byles; Chris Yeomans (Gosforth, Northumberland)	15–14	
men's fours	Josh Grant; Ashley Clipston; Dan Thornhill; Philip Broughton (Stute, Derbyshire)	Nick Wardle; Jonathan Green; Chris Moore; Joe Dawson (Kingscroft, Leicestershire)	19–14	
women's singles	Stef Branfield (Clevedon, Somerset)	Sophie Tolchard (Kings, Devon)	21–17	
women's 2w singles	Jane Murphy (Bletchley Town, Buckinghamshire)	Kat Bowman (New Lount, Leicestershire)	16–6	
women's cofc singles	Rhianna Russell (Welwyn & District, Hertfordshire)	Amy Pharaoh (Cleethorpes, Lincolnshire	21–13	
women's pairs	Caroline Cullum; Amy Pharaoh (Cleethorpes, Lincolnshire)	Lauren Selway; Emma Cooper (Kings, Devon)	18–6	
women's triples	Ruby Philpott; Chelsea Spencer; Amy Pharaoh (Cleethorpes, Lincolnshire)	Donna Grant; Katherine Hawes-Watts; Lorraine Kuhler (Headington, Oxfordshire)	19–17	
women's fours	Sara George; Olivia Starr; Laura Holden; Stef Branfield (Clevedon, Somerset)	Karen Millward; Pip Maxwell; Aqua Griffiths; Izzie White (Chester Road, Worcestershire)	18–16	

=== Other events ===
Event	Winner	Runner-up	Score	Ref
men's junior singles	Charlie Beeton (Felixstowe & Suffolk, Suffolk)	Luke Bell (Sports Centre, Southampton, Hants)	21–14	
men's junior pairs	Kieran Jaycock; Thomas Jaycock (Buckinghamshire)	Joe Sanford; Harry Duffield (Kent)	21–20	
men's singles (O60)	Kevin Bone (Lyndhurst, Durham)	Chris Hanslip (Blossom Way, Lincolnshire)	21–18	
men's pairs (O60)	Phil Hackett; Robert Honeywell (Devon)	Gren Richardson; Bob Mcavelia (Northumberland)	17–15	
men's fours (O60)	Phil Sturman; Dave Wilde; Neil Clarke; Mark Sandoz (Gilt Edge, Worcestershire)	Martin Dawkins; Mark Wilkinson; John Winter; Duncan Shearer (Houghton Regis, Bedfordshire)	17–9	
women's junior singles	Izzie White (Chester Road, Worcestershire)	Rhianna Russell (Welwyn & District, Hertfordshire)	21–16	
women's junior pairs	Ava Karanth; Yasmina Hasan (Surrey)	Rhianna Russell; Reba Powell-Birley (Hertfordshire)	19–9	
women's singles (O60)	Pauline Clark (Egham, Surrey)	Brenda Bowyer (Rochford, Essex)	21–12	
women's pairs (O60)	Val Davis; Liz Lock (Devon)	Christine Mitchell; Alison Fail (Wiltshire)	13–12	
women's fours (O60)	Dawn Horne; Anita Cowdrill; Jenny Wickens; Janice White (Royal Leamington Spa, Warwickshire)	Sue Entwistle; Alison Phillips; Jean Smith; Marie Dowson (Guisborough Priory, Yorkshire)	23–12	
mixed pairs	Curtis Johnson; Billie Swift (Kingsthorpe, Northamptonshire)	Alan Dent Jnr; Amy Pharaoh (Cleethorpes, Lincolnshire)	18–15	
mixed fours	Debbie Souter; Liz Anderson; Mark Bishopp; Charlie Souter (Southey, Surrey)	Sue Adams; Amy Spry; Norman Worley; Glen Adams (Hendon, Middlesex)	22–6	

=== Team events ===
Event	Winner	Runner-up	Score	Ref
Middleton Cup (men)	Devon	Lincolnshire	125–111	
Top Club (men)	Gerrards Cross (Bucks)	Avenue (Coventry) (Warks)	3–2	
Balcomb Trophy (men)	Leicestershire	Essex	69–43	
White Rose Trophy (U-25 men)	Huntingdonshire	Gloucestershire	46–34	
Club Two Fours (men)	Shrivenham (Berkshire)	Royal Mail Cart (Lincolnshire)	33–32	
Walker Cup (women)	Devon	Oxfordshire	71–66	
Amy Rose Bowl (U-31 women)	Somerset	East Anglians	40–37	
Johns Trophy (women)	Devon	Northamptonshire	111–65	
Top Club (women)	Royal Leamington Spa (Warks)	Kings (Devon)	3–1	
