= 2022 Bowls England National Finals =

2022 edition of the English national bowls championships

- Venue: Victoria Park, Leamington Spa
- Location: Royal Leamington Spa; Warwickshire
- Dates: 25 August – 11 September 2022

The 2022 Bowls England National Finals are a series of lawn bowls events to determine the National champions of England. The Championships are being held from 25 August to 11 September 2022, at the Royal Leamington Spa Bowls Club in Victoria Park, Leamington Spa. They are organised by Bowls England, and are open to lawn bowlers who qualify via their County Championships.

Sam Tolchard successfully defended his two wood singles title. Rebecca Moorbey became only the second woman (after Sophie Tolchard) to secure both the women's singles and women's junior singles titles.

In the elite pairs events, Nick Brett won his second national title partnering Lewis Baker and Sophie Tolchard won her eighth title partnering Harriet Stevens.

On 8 September 2022, play for 9 September was suspended due to the death of Elizabeth II.

== Results summary ==
=== Elite events ===
Event	Winner	Runner-up	Score
men's singles	Edward Morris (Essex County, Essex)	Andrew Walters (Welford-on-Avon, Warwickshire)	21–17
men's 2w singles	Sam Tolchard (Kings, Torquay, Devon)	Jack Emmerson (Newark Northern, Nottinghamshire)	17–13
men's cofc singles	Harry Goodwin (Appleyard, Kent)	Scott Walton (St Neots, Cambridgeshire)	21–18
men's pairs	Lewis Baker; Nick Brett (Brampton, Hunts)	Matt Hyde; Andrew Briden (Gerrards Cross, Bucks)	20–9
men's triples	Kevin Harrison; Mark Irwin; Stuart Irwin (Aspatria, Cumbria)	Josh Grant; Dan Thornhill; Phil Broughton (Stute, Derbyshire)	14–10
men's fours	Ean Morton; Simon Law; Stuart Popple; Tristan Morton (Parkway, Huntingdonshire)	John Coatham; Jason Haskins; Steve Marrett; Roger Kendrick (VCD, Kent)	22–17
women's singles	Rebecca Moorbey (Parkway, Huntingdonshire)	Elaine Score (The Springhouse, Essex)	21–16
women's 2w singles	Rhianna Russell (Welwyn & District, Hertfordshire)	Jennifer Southby (Bearstead & Thurnham, Kent)	14–12
women's cofc singles	Julie Leake (Poole Park, Dorset)	Sue Allen (Swinton, Yorkshire)	21–9
women's pairs	Sophie Tolchard; Harriet Stevens (King's, Devon)	Tracey Johnson; Joanne Rowe (Borough of Eye, Suffolk)	23–16
women's triples	Denise Hodd; Rachel Mackriell; Nina Allbut (Polegrove, Sussex)	Helen Lewis-Wall; Sally-Ann Lewis-Wall; Jamie-Lea Winch (Kingscroft, Leicestershire)	14–13
women's fours	Helen Butler; Louise Whyers; Penny Strong; Annalisa Dunham; Pearl Flowers (Carters Park, Lincolnshire)	Donna Knight; Carol Gaskins; Katherine Hawes; Lorraine Kuhler (Oxford City & County, Oxfordshire)	20–14

=== Other events ===
Event	Winner	Runner-up	Score
men's junior singles	Daniel Ellicott (Warwickshire)	Lloyd Milligan (Lancashire)	21–20
men's junior pairs	Kieron Kniveton; Scott Eveleigh (Devon)	Luke Bell; Dan Cookman (Hampshire)	16–15
men's senior singles	Jerry Rumball (Garston, Hertfordshire)	Graham Ashby (Nuneaton, Warwickshire)	21–16
men's senior pairs	Steve Smith; Graham Ashby (Warwickshire)	Steve Parr; Ken Weyand (Kent)	19–6
men's senior fours	Vaughan Holland; Paul Bunting; Craig Shaw; Alan Symondson (Reading, Berkshire)	Gary Toward; Graham Chappell; Keith Smith; Joe Breward (Blaby, Leicestershire)	13–12
women's junior singles	Rebecca Moorbey (Parkway, Huntingdonshire)	Olivia Starr (Clevedon, Somerset)	21–15
women's junior pairs	Izzie White; Maddie Burgess (Worcestershire)	Beth Ward; Kat Bowman (Leicestershire)	17–12
women's senior singles	Anne Bernard (Ryde Marina, Isle of Wight)	Caroline Cullum (Cleethorpes, Lincolnshire)	21–12
women's senior pairs	Lynn Williams; Elaine Amery (Somerset)	Patricia Browne; Sheila Storey (Northumberland)	20–12
women's senior fours	Christine Beamish; Sue Bard-Bodek; Sal Butcher; Sue Bernard (Borough Of Eye, Suffolk)	Kirsty Cox; Anne Burchell; Caroline Cullum; Glenys Bolt; Chris Love (Cleethorpes, Lincolnshire)	11–7
mixed pairs	Paul Smyth; Sylvia Bloomfield (Essex)	Russell Francis; Jean Collier (Wiltshire)	13–11
mixed fours	Paul Jenkins; Dennis Hennessy; Faye Ludlow; Hayley Halford (Surrey)	Scott Winskill; Mark Hancock; Jane Murphy; Bev Wall (Berkshire)	13–12

=== Team events ===
Event	Winner	Runner-up	Score
Middleton Cup (men)	Berkshire	Hertfordshire	133–95
Top Club (men)	Cheltenham (Gloucestershire)	Culm Vale (Devon)	3–2
Balcomb Trophy (men)	Essex	Yorkshire	45–27
White Rose Trophy (men)	Kent	Warwickshire	40–26
Club Two Fours (men)	Silksworth (Durham)	Brampton (Huntingdonshire)	32–31
Walker Cup (women)	Kent	Wiltshire	40–29
Amy Rose Bowl (women)	Kent	Northamptonshire	47–32
Johns Trophy (women)	Lincolnshire	Surrey	145–92
Top Club (women)	Kings (Devon)	Gerrards Cross (Buckinghamshire)	3–1
