= 2024 Bowls England National Finals =

British lawn bowls event

- Venue: Victoria Park, Leamington Spa
- Location: Royal Leamington Spa; Warwickshire
- Dates: 15 August – 1 September 2024

The 2024 Bowls England National Finals sponsored by Aviva, are a series of lawn bowls events to determine the National champions of England. The Championships were held from 15 August to 1 September 2024, at the Royal Leamington Spa Bowls Club in Victoria Park, Leamington Spa. They are organised by Bowls England, and are open to lawn bowlers who qualify via their County Championships.

Jamie Walker won the men's singles title.

== Results ==
=== Elite events ===
Event	Winner	Runner-up	Score
men's singles	Jamie Walker (Culm Vale, Devon)	Harry Goodwin (Appleyard, Kent)	21–11
men's 2w singles	Tom Bishop (Hollycroft Park, Leicestershire)	Mark Housley (Langwith Junction, Nottinghamshire)	17–10
men's cofc singles	Joe Dawson (Kingscroft, Leicestershire)	Adam Barker (St Neots, Cambridgeshire)	21–14
men's pairs	Ean Morton; Tristan Morton (Parkway, Huntingdonshire)	Dan Box; Andrew Walters (Welford-On-Avon, Warwickshire)	23–9
men's triples	Josh Grant; Dan Thornhill; Philip Broughton (Stute, Derbyshire)	Robert Stirling; Anthony Booth-Young; Lloyd Milligan (Heaton Hall, Lancashire)	19–14
men's fours	Steve Poyner; Chris Barton; Gareth Burbridge; Richard Moule (Vines Park, Worcestershire)	Rob Dodds; Joseph Tindall; Jamie Tindall; Charlie Souter (Southey, Surrey)	18–15
women's singles	Izzie White (Chester Road, Worcestershire)	Anne Bernard (Ryde Marina, Isle of Wight)	21–10
women's 2w singles	Laura Holden (Clevedon, Somerset)	Lorraine Kuhler (Oxford City & County, Oxfordshire)	15–12
women's cofc singles	Stef Branfield (Clevedon, Somerset)	Sue Allen (Swinton, Yorkshire)	21–16
women's pairs	Katherine Hawes-Watts; Lorraine Kuhler (Oxford City & County, Oxfordshire)	Caroline Cullum; Amy Pharaoh (Cleethorpes, Lincolnshire)	18–11
women's triples	Louise Whyers; Penny Strong; Annalisa Dunham (Burton House, Lincolnshire)	Rebecca Willgress; Christine Rednall; Katherine Rednall (Norfolk BC, Norfolk)	17–12
women's fours	Michelle Meadowcroft; Ellie Hamblett; Emily Kernick; Kirsty Richards (Royal Leamington Spa, Warwicks)	Sara George; Jacquil Branfield; Laura Holden; Stef Branfield (Clevedon, Somerset)	22–9

=== Other events ===
Event	Winner	Runner-up	Score
men's junior singles	Kieran Jaycock (Broadway, Buckinghamshire)	Dylan Martin (Garston, Hertfordshire)	21–9
men's junior pairs	Ryan Corkill; Callum Hodgson (Cumbria)	Carlos Lali; Ryan Lali (Berkshire)	18–14
men's senior singles	Ken Weyland (St. Lawrence, Kent)	Andrew Squire (Maldon, Essex)	21–13
men's senior pairs	Ken Sawyer; Tim Bloomer (Gloucestershire)	Richard Spriggs; Steve Gunnell (Essex)	22–21
men's senior fours	David Lee; Laurence Kelly; Tom Prescott; John Baird (Carlisle Subscription, Cumbria)	David Simpson; John Godman; Kirk Smith; Alan Price (Gerrards Cross, Buckinghamshire)	18–11
women's junior singles	Millie Tuck (Poole Park, Dorset)	Ruby Hill (Cleethorpes, Lincolnshire)	21–15
women's junior pairs	Lily-Mae Adams; Emily Kernick (Warwickshire)	Jemma Tuohy; Yasmina Hasan (Surrey)	19–13
women's senior singles	Fiona Waters (Victoria WSM, Som)	Caroline Campion (Banbury Central, Oxon)	21–15
women's senior pairs	Val Molton; Lindsay Collin (Gloucestershire)	Caroline Campion; Carole Galletly (Oxfordshire)	17–6
women's senior fours	Lesley Johnson; Alice Atwell; Hazel Marke; Margaret Holden (Alton Social, Hampshire)	Dawn Horne; Caroline Edwards; Jenny Wickens; Janice White; Anita Cowdrill (Royal Leamington Spa, Warwickshire)	13–12
mixed pairs	Alan Dent Jnr; Amy Pharaoh (Lincolnshire)	Rhianna Russell; Glenn Williams (Hertfordshire)	23–7
mixed fours	Jacqueline Squires; Debbie Preston; Alex Squires; Lloyd Sabatini (Buckinghamshire)	Rachel Cartwright; Kayleigh Proctor; Simon Richardson; Chris Yeomans (Northumberland)	18–17

=== Team events ===
Event	Winner	Runner-up	Score
Middleton Cup (men)	Wiltshire	Northumberland	106–91
Top Club (men)	Gerrards Cross (Buckinghamshire)	Reading (Berkshire)	3.5–1.5
Balcomb Trophy (men)	Norfolk	Durham	47–23
White Rose Trophy (U-25 men)	Warwickshire	Hampshire	36–28
Club Two Fours (men)	Gerrards Cross, Bucks	Brampton, Hunts	30–27
Walker Cup (women)	Surrey	Northamptonshire	40–32
Amy Rose Bowl (U-31 women)	Kent	Lincolnshire	42–30
Johns Trophy (women)	Lincolnshire	Somerset	125–111
Top Club (women)	Appleyard (Kent)	Southey (Surrey)	2–2 (65-62)
