= Bowls England National Championships (mixed fours) =

British lawn bowls event

The mixed fours is one of the events at the annual Bowls England National Championships.

== Venues ==
- 1989–1989 (Stoke Bowling Club, Coventry)
- 1990–1990 (Swindon)
- 1991–1991 (Nottingham)
- 1994–1994 (Swindon)
- 2014–present (Victoria Park, Royal Leamington Spa)

== Sponsors ==
- 1990–1992 (Liverpool Victoria)
- 2023–2025 (Aviva)

== Past winners ==
| Year | Champions | County | Runners-up | County | Score | Ref |
|---|---|---|---|---|---|---|
| 1989 | Janet Bishop, Pam Margrett, Mike Bishop, Eddie Kavanagh | Gloucs | Janet Tomlin, Dee Wilson, Alant Bates, Mick Tomlin | Lincs | 21–20 | |
| 1990 | Norma May, Sylvia Strutt, Howard Strutt, A. May | Cornwall | Nancy Goosey, Bill Britchford, Mary Britchford, Eric Rodgers | Hants | 31–9 | |
| 1991 | Mrs E. Smith, Mrs A. Moore, C. Bryan, W. Whiteman | Essex | Sally Smith, Jayne Roylance, Ian Wones, Martin Christmas | Norfolk | 15–13 | |
| 1992 | Irene Barber, Brenda Lines, Alan Lines, Gerry Smyth | Middx | Mrs J. Armstrong, Mrs S. Flitcroft, Ian Carruthers, John Wills | Cumbria | 26–14 | |
| 1993 | Pat Launders, Jean Staples, Robin Bellion, Gary Little | Middx | Sue Jones, Jean Perry, Geoffrey Green, Cliff Jones | Warks | 28–16 | |
| 1994 | Miss I. Howlett, Miss C. Swan, David Lockhart, Gordon Niven | Lancs | Mrs R. Bailey, Mrs R. Ford, K. Ford, C. Bailey | Hants | 21–10 | |
| 1995 | Katherine Hawes, Jackie Harrington, Howard Watts, Gary Harrington | Oxon | Mrs S. Chilton, Mrs M. Walker, Edward Boyle, Iain M. Boyle | Yorks | 24–23 | |
| 1996 | Jean Drury, June Hartley, Mark Walton, Neil Brignall | Yorks | Miss S. Lee, Mrs H. Sadler, M. Long, B. Sadler | Norfolk | 20–11 | |
| 1997 | Patricia Smith, Joyce Evans, Gordon Evans, Ian Snowden | Berks | Christine Shearing, Joan Belcher, Peter Shearing, Anthony Shearing | Hants | 22–14 | |
| 1998 | Christine Webb, Jayne Roylance, Trevor Webb, David Ward | Norfolk | Dee Killington, Mary Oliver, John Rodwell, John Tully | Essex | 29–13 | |
| 1999 | Katherine Hawes, Jackie Harrington, Glenn Allen, Howard Watts | Oxon | Jean Drury, June Hartley, Mark Walton, Neil Brignall | Yorks | 19–17 | |
| 2000 | Liz Garrett, Jean Foster, Mark Garrett, Alan Foster | Essex | June Corbett, Sue Gravell, Sid Corbett, Les Sullivan | Wilts | 21–9 | |
| 2001 | Irene Barber, Brenda Lines, Bob Bass, Gerry Smyth | Middx/Bucks | Anne Pearce, Mrs H. Phillips, Chris Thresher, Peter Ward | Hants | 23–19 | |
| 2002 | Rosemary Bailey, Sandy Moyse, Fred Voller, Charles Bailey | Hants | Joyce Bristow, Viv Tomlinson, Fergus Muat, Alec Atkinson | Lancs | 23–11 | |
| 2003 | Margaret Lawson, Mary Entwistle, Paul Dale, Simon Gilbert | Warks | Elizabeth Haynes, Sue Harriott, Terry Reardon, William Davis | Devon | 28–27 | |
| 2004 | Molly Manning, Carol Grenfell, Craig Doughty, Nick Grenfell | Som t | Pat Andrews, Mary Johnson, A. Johnson, Bob Flint | Ken | 19–10 | |
| 2005 | Tina Burgess, Karen Leveridge, Darren Lyman, Paul Broderick | Northants | Kelly Jenkins, Irene Jenkins, Kevin Clarke, Ian Jenkins | Surrey | 23–19 | |
| 2006 | Mrs J. Short, Paul Kinsman, Pam Parkhouse, John Short | Devon | Anne Pearce, Wendy Line, Peter Line, Chris Thresher | Hants | 23–20 | |
| 2007 | Kath Lloyd, Debbie Shadwell, Keith Hutchens, Graham Shadwell | Wilts | June Foster, Sue Westoby, Stephen Dilks, Mark Walton | Yorks | 26–11 | |
| 2008 | Lorraine Hackett, Sophie Tolchard, James Webber, Sam Tolchard | Devon | Sirikan Holmes, Val Chaney, Steven Mitchinson, Jamie Holmes | Essex | 27–12 | |
| 2009 | Christine Gowshall, Stacy Dent; Jonathan Darley, Bernard Gowshall | Lincs | Val Howley, Norah Holder; Darren Holder, Andrew Knapper | Berks | 24–14 | |
| 2010 | Elaine Score, Ann Score, Gerry Bone, Raymond Bone | Essex | Karen Cranham, Jean Philip, Chris Cranham, Leo May | Hants | 24–13 | |
| 2011 | Anne Pearce, Wendy Line, Peter Line, Colin Thresher | Hants | Geraldine Jamieson, Norma Craig, Peter Duffy, Simon Richardson | Northumb | 20–13 | |
| 2012 | Lorraine Hackett, Sophie Tolchard, Phil Hackett, Sam Tolchard | Devon | Lynne Bowen, Amy Stanton, Adrian Burbridge, Andrew Walters | Worcs | 22–8 | |
| 2013 | Ellen Falkner, Jayne Christie; Chris Falkner, Nick Brett | Cambs/Hunts | Sophie Tolchard, Lorraine Hackett; Phil Hackett, Sam Tolchard | Devon | 22–5 | |
| 2014 | Rebecca Wigfield, Katie Smith; Darren Childs & Jamie Walker | Leics; Northants | Carol Grenfell, Janet Hardie; Nick Grenfell, Graham Shadwell | Wilts | 23–15 | |
| 2015 | Sophie Tolchard, Harriet Stevens; Lee Haywood, Ryan Whitlock | Devon | Lisa Smith, Moira Parsons; Matt Wordingham, Andy Smith | Warks | 28–18 | |
| 2016 | Rebecca Wigfield, Katie Smith; Darren Childs, Jamie Walker | Northants | Sue Kemp, Elaine Score, Neil Jackson, Ed Morris | Essex | 19–18 | |
| 2017 | Sue Kemp, Elaine Score; Mark Nullmeyers, Ed Morris | Essex | Carol Galletly, Katherine Hawes; Mark Sykes, Howard Watts | Oxon | 23–16 | |
| 2018 | Debbie Souter, Liz Anderson; Mark Bishopp, Charlie Souter | Surrey | Sue Kemp, Elaine Score; Mark Nullmeyers, Ed Morris | Essex | 18–13 | |
| 2019 | Joan Surman, Penny Callaghan; Lee Williamson, Nathan Kitchen | Glocs | Ruby Hill, Chelsea Tomlin; Ashley Caress, Martin Spence | Lincs | 23–15 | |
| No competition due to COVID-19 pandemic | | | | | | |
| 2021 | Amy Cheeseman, Christine Hewison; Michael Cheeseman, Tom Bishop | Kent | Ellen Falkner MBE, Cheryl Salisbury; Jamie Barker, Scott Walton | Cambs | 13–11 | |
| 2022 | Faye Ludlow, Hayley Halford; Paul Jenkins, Dennis Hennessy | Surrey | Jane Murphy, Bev Wall; Scott Winskill, Mark Hancock | Berks | 13–12 | |
| 2023 | Rachel Cartwright, Kayleigh Proctor; Chris Yeomans, Simon Richardson | Northumb | Chloe Brett, Rebecca Moorbey; Lewis Baker, Nick Brett | Hunts | 21–17 | |
| 2024 | Jacqueline Squires, Debbie Preston; Alex Squires, Lloyd Sabatini | Bucks | Rachel Cartwright, Kayleigh Proctor; Simon Richardson, Chris Yeomans | Northumb | 18–17 | |
| 2025 | Debbie Souter, Liz Anderson; Mark Bishopp, Charlie Souter | Surrey | Sue Adams, Amy Spry; Norman Worley, Glen Adams | Middx | 22–6 | |
| 2026 | James Fitzgerald, Tom Holmes; Hannah Smith, Iona Bird | Glocs | Ian Jenkins, Barry Jenkins, Michael Sigamoney; Kylie Jenkins, Kelly Jenkins, | Surrey | 18–12 | |
