= 2021 Bowls England National Finals =

2021 edition of the English national bowls championships

- Venue: Victoria Park, Leamington Spa
- Location: Royal Leamington Spa; Warwickshire
- Dates: 19 August – 19 September 2021

The 2021 Bowls England National Finals are a series of lawn bowls events to determine the National champions of England. The Championships were held from 19 August to 19 September 2021, at the Royal Leamington Spa Bowls Club in Victoria Park, Leamington Spa. They are organised by Bowls England, and are open to lawn bowlers who qualify via their County Championships. The 2021 finals were streamed live for the first time on YouTube. The National Finals had been cancelled in 2020 due to the COVID-19 pandemic.

Sam Tolchard won his sixth and seventh men's national championship title after winning the men's singles and two wood singles. His sister Sophie Tolchard won her eighth national title when winning the triples with Harriet Stevens and Emma Cooper. Stef Branfield emulated Sam Tolchard in claiming two singles titles at the Championships, the bowler from the Clevedon club (made famous by the legendary David Bryant) won the singles and followed it with the two wood singles a few days later. Branfield nearly made history by winning the champion of champion title as well but lost in the final to Ellen Falkner MBE.

In the women's pairs, sisters Katy Smith and Lucy Smith scored 4 points on the last end to overcome a 3 point deficit to defeat Margaret Smith & Sharmishta Patel.

== Results summary ==
=== Elite events ===
Event	Winner	Runner-up	Score
men's singles	Sam Tolchard (Kings, Torquay, Devon)	David Bolt (Silksworth, Durham)	21–12
men's 2w singles	Sam Tolchard (Kings, Torquay, Devon)	Ed Morris (Essex County, Essex)	17–13
men's cofc singles	Jamie Chestney (Culm Vale, Devon)	Mark Royal (Rookery, Suffolk)	21–11
men's pairs	John Tufts; Wayne Willgress (Norfolk BC, Norfolk)	Sam Tolchard; Louis Ridout (Kings, Torquay, Devon)	15–6
men's triples	Christopher Muir; Steve Gunnell; Ed Morris (Essex County, Essex)	Lee Phillips; James Hampton; Kevin Phillips (Topsham, Devon)	18–11
men's fours	Stephen Cook; Ian Williams; James Park; David Forster (Workington, Cumbria)	Tom McGuinness; David Ross; Kirk Smith; John McGuinness (Gerrards Cross, Buckinghamshire)	20–5
women's singles	Stef Branfield (Clevedon, Somerset)	Chris Mitchell (Purton, Wiltshire)	21–16
women's 2w singles	Stef Branfield (Clevedon, Somerset)	Katherine Hawes (Oxford City & County, Oxfordshire)	16–10
women's cofc singles	Ellen Falkner MBE (Littleport, Cambridgeshire)	Stef Branfield (Clevedon, Somerset)	21–8
women's pairs	Katy Smith; Lucy Smith (Westlecot, Wiltshire)	Margaret Smith; Sharmishta Patel (Sutton, Surrey)	17–16
women's triples	Harriet Stevens; Sophie Tolchard; Emma Cooper (Kings, Torquay, Devon)	Charlotte Emanuel; Kat Hornbrook; Zoe Hollins (Milford, Surrey)	22–9
women's fours	Hayley Kenny; Michelle Squires; Serena Madgewick; Rebecca Smith (Clockhouse, Essex)	Louise Williams; Brenda Benney; Nicola Ellis; Frances Phillips (Helston, Cornwall)	20–13

=== Other events ===
Event	Winner	Runner-up	Score
men's junior singles	Jordan Philpott (Royal Mail Cart, Lincs)	Harry Goodwin (Kings, Torquay, Devon)	21–16
men's junior pairs	Kieron Kniveton; Harry Goodwin (Exonia/Kings, Devon)	Adam Pitfield; Nathan Betts (Burton Latimer Town/NWE, Northants)	15–11
men's senior singles	Grant Burgess (Chester Road, Worcestershire)	Grant Osborne (Sandy Conservative, Bedfordshire)	21–17
men's senior pairs	Stewart Stephens; Jim Garner (Dorset)	Ray Gaskins; Howard Watts (Oxfordshire)	17–10
men's senior fours	Brett Arkley; Tony Humphries; Alex Bryden; Alan Theobald (Dunston, Durham)	Howard Else; Paul Williamson; Leonard Hale; Irvine Powdrill (East Leake, Nottinghamshire)	16–11
women's junior singles	Kat Bowman (Thringstone, Leicestershire)	Alice Lovett (Oakley, Hampshire)	21–10
women's junior pairs	Chloe Brett; Rebecca Moorbey (Huntingdonshire)	Nicole Rogers; Emma Cooper (Devon)	18–14
women's senior singles	Sandra Maguire (Forest Oaks, Nottinghamshire)	Janet Williamson (Hyde Abbey, Hampshire)	21–18
women's senior pairs	Moira Self; Julie Spice (Felixstowe & Suffolk, Suffolk)	Kirsty Cox; Caroline Cullum (Cleethorpes, Lincolnshire)	17–16
women's senior fours	Kirsty Cox; Anne Burchell; Caroline Cullum; Glenys Bolt (Cleethorpes, Lincolnshire)	Lesley Johnson; Alice Atwell; Hazel Marke; Margaret Holden (Alton Social, Hampshire)	17–12
mixed pairs	Ed Morris; Elaine Score (Essex)	Mark Walton; Sue Allen (Yorkshire)	23–5
mixed fours	Michael Cheeseman; Tom Bishop; Amy Cheeseman; Christine Hewison (Kent)	Jamie Barker; Scott Walton; Ellen Falkner MBE; Cheryl Salisbury (Cambridgeshire)	13–11

=== Team events ===
Event	Winner	Runner-up	Score
Middleton Cup (men)	Kent	Northamptonshire	121–111
Top Club (men)	Bromley, Kent	Culm Vale, Devon	3–2
Balcomb Trophy (men)	Northamptonshire	Hampshire	40–34
White Rose Trophy (men)	Buckinghamshire	Northamptonshire	42–30
Club Two Fours (men)	Reading, Berkshire	Burton House, Lincolnshire	28–22
Walker Cup (women)	Lincolnshire	Kent	47–29
Amy Rose Bowl (women)	Somerset	Hertfordshire	48–33
Johns Trophy (women)	Devon	Surrey	113–111
Top Club (women)	Kings, Devon	Appleyard, Kent	3–1
