= Bowls England National Championships (women's champion of champions) =

British lawn bowls event

The women's champion of champions is one of the events at the annual Bowls England National Championships.

== History ==
The event started in 1989, five years after the inauguration of the equivalent men's event, the Bowls England National Championships (men's champion of champions).

== Venues ==
- 1989–present (Victoria Park, Royal Leamington Spa)

== Sponsors ==
- 1991–1994 (Henselite)
- 2000 (National Express)
- 2005 (Thomas Cook)
- 2023–2025 (Aviva)

== Past winners ==
Year	Champion	Club	County	Runner-up	Club	County	Ref
1989	Brenda Brown	Colchester	Essex	Jill Price	Burnham-on-Sea	Somerset	
1990	Gill Fitzgerald	Kettering Lodge	Northamptonshire	Mavis Steele	Sunbury Sports	Middlesex	
1991	Kay Martin	Atherley	Hampshire	Shirley Sullivan	Woodley	Berkshire	
1992	Maureen Tims	Whitnash	Warwickshire	Jill Polley	Great Beddow	Essex	
1993	Margaret Reeve	Caer Glow	Gloucestershire	Linda Jarman	Chesterton	Cambridgeshire	
1994	Jean Baker	Blackwell	Derbyshire	Pam Garden	Egham	Surrey	
1995	Bridget Hay	Leamington Spa	Warwickshire	Yvonne Wallington	Milton Regis	Kent	
1996	Gill Fitzgerald	Kettering Lodge	Northamptonshire	Judy Fawcett	Nafferton	Yorkshire	
1997	Katherine Hawes	Oxford City & County	Oxfordshire	Frances Hewitt	Bridport	Dorset	
1998	Amy Gowshall	Waltham Park	Lincs	Joan Crapper	Beech Hill	Bedfordshire	
1999	Amy Gowshall	Waltham Park	Lincs	Lynne Whitehead	Norfolk BC	Norfolk	
2000	Suzanne Gurr	Folkestone Park	Kent	Cindy Edmondson	Skelton	Cumbria	
2001	Linda Ryan	Civil Service	Kent	Diana Whittingham	Kingsway	Sussex	
2002	Jane Baxter-Avison	Arnold Park	Notts	Ellen Alexander	City of Ely	Cambridgeshire	
2003	Amy Monkhouse	Waltham Park	Lincs	Katherine Hawes	Oxford City & County	Oxfordshire	
2004	Amy Monkhouse	Waltham Park	Lincs	Frances Hewett	Bridport	Dorset	
2005	Sue Evans	Honiton	Devon	Marilyn Gozna	Portishead RBL	Somerset	
2006	Elaine Score	United Services	Essex	Christine Pearson	Moreton-in-Marsh	Gloucestershire	
2007	Amy Monkhouse	Waltham Park	Lincs	Joyce Hadfield	St Austell	Cornwall	
2008	Rebecca Smith	Clock House	Essex	Katherine Hawes	Oxford City & County	Oxfordshire	
2009	Amy Monkhouse	Cleethorpes	Lincolnshire	Natalie Melmore	Kings Torquay	Devon	
2010	Katherine Hawes	Oxford City & County	Oxfordshire	Amy Monkhouse	Cleethorpes	Lincolnshire	
2011	Lynne Bowen	Broadway	Worcestershire	Jo Skelton	Stute	Derbyshire	
2012	Amy Gowshall	Cleethorpes	Lincolnshire	Caroline Campion	Banbury Central	Oxfordshire	
2013	Amy Gowshall	Cleethorpes	Lincolnshire	Julie Leake	Poole Park	Dorset	
2014	Helen McDermaid	Watchet	Somerset	Jean Stephens	Newmarket Avenue	Cambridgeshire	
2015	Donna Brookes	Bletchley Town	Buckinghamshire	Carol Dixon	New Lount	Leicestershire	
2016	Rebecca Wigfield	Desborough Town	Northamptonshire	Elaine Score	The Springhouse	Essex	
2017	Ellen Falkner	Littleport	Cambridgeshire	Kirsty Hembrow	Taunton Deane	Somerset	
2018	Amy Gowshall	Cleethorpes	Lincolnshire	Katherine Hawes	Oxford City & County	Oxfordshire	
2019	Ellen Falkner	Littleport	Cambridgeshire	Amy Gowshall	Cleethorpes	Lincolnshire	
2020 cancelled due to the COVID-19 pandemic							
2021	Ellen Falkner MBE	Littleport	Cambridgeshire	Stef Branfield	Clevedon	Somerset	
2022	Julie Leake	Poole Park	Dorset	Sue Allen	Swinton	Yorkshire	
2023	Annalisa Dunham	Carters Park	Lincs	Donna Rock	Sherborne	Dorset	
2024	Stef Branfield	Clevedon	Som	Sue Allen	Swinton	Yorks	
2025	Rhianna Russell	Welwyn & District	Herts	Amy Pharaoh	Cleethorpes	Lincs	
2026	Maddie Burgess	Kingscroft	Leics	Amy Banes	Sheerness Town (St. Georges)	Kent	
