= Bowls England National Championships (women's junior pairs) =

British lawn bowls event

The women's junior pairs is one of the events at the annual Bowls England National Championships.

== Venues ==
- 1983–present (Victoria Park, Royal Leamington Spa)

== Past winners ==
Year	Champion	County	Runner-up	County	Ref
2004	Sadie Spring & Ellen Falkner	Essex	Natalie Gordon & Sian Gordon	Kent	
2005	Nicola Coombs & Heather Stapleford	Herts	Laura Sutton & Hannah McConnell	Beds	
2006	Charlotte Yates & Emma Bass	Leics	Lorraine Kuhler & Lyndsey Hodd	Sussex	
2007	Amanda Higginbotham & Kylie Hampton	Surrey	Jamie-Lea Winch & Helen Slimm	Warwicks	
2008	Ruth Cullum & Annalisa Bellamy	Lincs	Serena Madgewick & Kelly King	Essex	
2009	Vicky Room & Charlene Turpie	Bucks	Helen Slimm & Jamie-Lea Winch	Warwicks	
2010	Laura Holden & Stef Branfield	Somerset	Amanda Higginbotham & Sophie Tolchard	Devon	
2011	Sophie Inchley & Amy Stanton	Worcs	Tara Cheetham & Helen Mason	Derbys	
2012	Emma Cooper & Lorraine Kuhler	Sussex	Sophie Inchley & Amy Stanton	Worcs	
2013	Emma Cooper & Lorraine Kuhler	Sussex	Maria de Bie & Katie Smith	Leics	
2014	Harriett Segasby & Rebecca Field	Norfolk	Sophie Inchley & Amy Stanton	Worcs	
2015	Emma Cooper & Lorraine Kuhler	Sussex	Amy King & Hayley MacDonald	Yorks	
2016	Sophie Tolchard & Harriet Stevens	Devon	Rebecca McMillan & Laura Holden	Somerset	
2017	Emma Cooper & Morgan Merryweather	Berkshire	Michaela Sabin & Kirsty Richards	Warwickshire	
2018	Devon Cooper & Rachel Tremlett	Hertfordshire	Katy Smith & Lucy Smith	Wiltshire	
2019	Hayley Kenny & Jasmine Wilson	Essex	Devon Cooper & Rachel Tremlett	Hertfordshire	
2020 No competition due to COVID-19 pandemic					
2021	Chloe Brett & Rebecca Moorbey	Huntingdonshire	Nicole Rogers & Emma Cooper	Devon	
2022	Izzie White & Maddie Burgess	Worcestershire	Beth Ward, Kat Bowman	Leicestershire	
2023	Lily-Mae Adams & Emily Kernick	Warwickshire	Molly Feetham & Ruby Hill	Lincolnshire	
2024	Lily-Mae Adams & Emily Kernick	Warks	Jemma Tuohy & Yasmina Hasan	Surrey	
2025	Ava Karanth & Yasmina Hasan	Surrey	Rhianna Russell & Reba Powell-Birley	Herts	
2026	Felicity Sheldrake & Madi King	Som	Victoria Staples & Maddie Burgess	Leics	
