= Bowls England National Championships (men's champion of champions) =

British lawn bowls event

The men's champion of champions is one of the events at the annual Bowls England National Championships.

== Venues ==
- 1984–1986 (Hemel Hempstead BC)
- 1987 (Bilton BC, Rugby)
- 1988–1991 (Bath BC)
- 1992–2013 (Worthing Bowls Club, Beach House Park)
- 2014–present (Victoria Park, Royal Leamington Spa)

== Sponsors ==
- 1985–1986 (Croxley Script)
- 1988–1990 (Bristol & West Building Society)
- 1992 (The Woolwich)
- 1993 (Sanatogen)
- 2023-2025 (Aviva)

== Past winners ==
Year	Champion	Club	County	Runner-up	Club	County	Score	Ref
1984	David Cutler	Civil Service	Devon	Brian Ward	Livesey Memorial	Kent	21–17	
1985	Danny Denison	Newton Abbot	Devon	Roy Cutts	Marlborough Ipswich	Suffolk	21–18	
1986	Danny Denison	Newton Abbot	Devon	Ron Keating	Plymouth Civil Service	Devon	21–10	
1987	Peter Gilbert	Kensey Vale	Cornwall	John Ottaway	Wymondham Dell	Norfolk	21–20	
1988	Tony Allcock	Cheltenham	Glocs	Gary A. Smith	Blackheath & Greenwich	Kent	21–6	
1989	Ralph Shakespeare	Avenue, Leamington Spa	Warks	Iain Boyle	Bert Keech	Yorks	25–17	
1990	Mike Bennett	West Witney	Oxon	John Dobson	Egham	Surrey	25–23	
1991	Tony Allcock MBE	Cheltenham	Glocs	John Kelly	Civil Service	Devon	21–11	
1992	Tony Allcock MBE	Cheltenham	Glocs	John Bell	Wigton	Cumbria	21–20	
1993	Gary Harrington	Summertown	Oxon	Barney Fernandes	Swindon	Wilts	21–15	
1994	Michael Arnold	Margate	Kent	Mark Christmas	Croydon	Essex	21–18	
1995	Charles Wright	White Rock	Sussex	Hughie Whitehead	Shildon	Durham	21–7	
1996	Terry James	Thrapston	Northants	Dean Morgan	Boscombe Cliff	Hants	21–11	
1997	Arthur Jackson	Broadway	Worcs	Robert Dykes	Roker Marine	Durham	21–20	
1998	Ian Mayne	Acton Bridge	Lancs	Andrew Smith	Welford-on-Avon	Warks	21–14	
1999	Danny Denison	Torquay	Devon	John Miller	Arnold Park	Notts	21–11	
2000	Danny Denison	Torquay	Devon	Jimmy Hobday	West Backwell	Som	21–8	
2001	John Ottaway	Wymondham Dell	Norfolk	Nigel Cordy	Cleethorpes	Lincs	21–13	
2002	Mick Sharpe	Kingsthorpe	Northants	Stephen Farish	Wigton	Cumbria	21–17	
2003	Mark Royal	Ipswich	Suffolk	Mick Sharpe	Kingsthorpe	Northants	21–7	
2004	Steve Pickford	Romford	Essex	Brian Taylor	County Arts	Norfolk	21–13	
2005	Paul Broderick	Wellingborough	Kent	Mike Goord	Eltham	Northants	2–0 sets	
2006	Leo May	Pyestock	Hants	Graham White	Meltis 96	Beds	2–1 sets	
2007	Sam Tolchard	Kings, Torquay	Devon	Raymond Gaskins	Princes Risborough	Bucks	21–19	
2008	Billy Jackson	Perry Sports	Lincs	Sam Tolchard	Kings Torquay	Devon	21–19	
2009	John Rednall	Felixstowe & Suffolk	Suffolk	Andrew Walters	Broadway	Worcs	21–19	
2010	David Scott	Cavaliers	Notts	Chris Daniels	Boscombe Cliff	Hants	21–17	
2011	Louis Ridout	Ilminster	Som	Simon Skelton	Stute	Derbys	21–14	
2012	Matthew Coppen	Royston	Herts	Robert Drew	Cambridge & County	Cambs	21–17	
2013	Scott Dunham	Carter's Park	Lincs	Duncan Heard	Woodbridge Hill	Surrey	21–12	
2014	Matthew Marchant	Southsea Waverley	Hants	Paul Woolford	Herne Bay	Kent	21–14	
2015	Jamie Walker	Northampton West End	Northants	Matthew Marchant	Southsea Waverley	Hants	21–9	
2016	Perry Martin	Milton Regis	Kent	Rob Paxton	Crediton	Devon	21–19	
2017	Glenn Williams	Royston	Herts	Russell Francis	Spencer Moulton	Wilts	21–17	
2018	Andrew Broad	St. Stephen	Cornwall	Glen Adams	Hendon	Middx	21–18	
2019	Sam Tolchard	Kings Torquay	Devon	David Pitt	Masonian	Middx	21–4	
2020 No competition due to COVID-19 pandemic								
2021	Jamie Chestney	Culm Vale	Devon	Mark Royal	Rookery	Suffolk	21–11	
2022	Harry Goodwin	Appleyard	Kent	Scott Walton	St Neots	Cambs	21–18	
2023	Graham Ashby	Nuneaton	Warks	Phil Harvey	St Georges Dragons	Northumb	21–13	
2024	Joe Dawson	Kingscroft	Leics	Adam Barker	St Neots	Cambs	21–14	
2025	Edward Morris	Essex County	Essex	Chris Hanslip	Blossom Way	Lincs	21–7	
2026	Tom McGuinness	Gerrards Cross	Bucks	Mark Perrott	Culm Vale	Devon	21–16	
