= Bowls England National Championships (women's junior singles) =

British lawn bowls event

The women's junior singles is one of the events at the annual Bowls England National Championships.

== Venues ==
- 1983–present (Victoria Park, Royal Leamington Spa)

== Sponsors ==
- 1983–1985 (Lombard)
- 1986–1993 (Liverpool Victoria)
- 1995 (Royal Priors)
- 1999 (Rinks Bowls Equipment)
- 2000, 2002–2004 (National Express)
- 2001–2001 (Steradent)
- 2023–2025 (Aviva)

== Past winners ==
Year	Champion	Club	County	Runner-up	Club	County	Ref
1983	Sally Smith	Norwich	Norfolk	Catherine Anton	Peterborough	Hunts	
1984	Sally Smith	Heartsease St Francis	Norfolk	Sharon Rickman	Cuddington	Surrey	
1985	Sue Franklin	Woolpack Wisbech	Norfolk	Linda Beake	Egham	Surrey	
1986	Sue Franklin	Woolpack Wisbech	Norfolk	Gail Hunter	Upminster	Essex	
1987	Catherine Anton	Peterborough	Hunts	Sharon Rickman	Raynes Park	Surrey	
1988	Catherine Anton	Peterborough	Hunts	Jackie Paine	Waltham Abbey	Essex	
1989	Helen Pettitt	Shepherds Bush	Middx	Sarah Irons	Ely	Cambs	
1990	Catherine Anton	Peterborough	Hunts	Bernadette Hill	Billet	Essex	
1991	Catherine Anton	Peterborough	Hunts	Linda Beake	Old Dean	Surrey	
1992	Helen Gapp	Rockland White Hart	Norfolk	Kathryn Hindley	Wilton Salisbury	Wilts	
1993	Lisa Francis	Welford	Warks	Debbie Loveless	Brighton	Sussex	
1994	Lynne Whitehead	Norfolk BC	Norfolk	Kathryn Hindley	Wilton Salisbury	Wilts	
1995	Kathryn Hindley	Wilton Salisbury	Wilts	Wendy James	Wendover & Chiltern	Bucks	
1996	Amy Gowshall	Grimsby Park Avenue	Lincs	Helen Pettit	Shepherds Bush	Middx	
1997	Cheryl Northall	Paignton	Devon	Lynne Whitehead	Norfolk BC	Norfolk	
1998	Lynne Whitehead	Norfolk BC	Norfolk	Rachel Chedgzoy	Stratford Town	Warks	
1999	Amy Gowshall	Waltham Park	Lincs	Nicola Poole	Morchard Bishop	Devon	
2000	Cheryl Northall	Paignton	Devon	Sarah Poyser	Notts Constabulary	Notts	
2001	Amy Gowshall	Waltham Park	Lincs	Cheryl Northall	Torquay	Devon	
2002	Amy Gowshall	Waltham Park	Lincs	Nicola Poole	Morchard Bishop	Devon	
2003	Debbie Sarratt	Old Coulsdon	Surrey	Amy Monkhouse	Waltham Park	Lincs	
2004	Katrina Jones		Bucks	Heather Stapleford	Baldock Town	Herts	
2005	Rebecca Smith		Essex	Gemma Broadhurst		Notts	
2006	Jo Simmons		Derbys	Natalie Melmore	Newton Abbot	Devon	
2007	Natalie Melmore	Newton Abbot	Devon	Kirsty Richards	Bournville	Warks	
2008	Jamie-Lea Winch	Bilton	Warks	Stef Branfield	Clevedon	Som	
2009	Annalisa Bellamy	Carters Park	Lincs	Debbie Sarratt	Old Coulsdon	Surrey	
2010	Abigail Manser	Rookery	Suffolk	Jamie-Lea Winch	Bilton	Warks	
2011	Annalisa Bellamy	Carters Park	Lincs	Rebecca Wigfield	Desborough	Northants	
2012	Jamie-Lea Winch	Thornfield Rugby	Warks	Kirsty Richards	Bournville	Warks	
2013	Sophie Tolchard	Kings Torquay	Devon	Hannah Overton	Parkway	Hunts	
2014	Amy Stanton	Broadway	Worcs	Megan Hunt	West Ealing	Middx	
2015	Sophie Tolchard	Kings Torquay	Devon	Jamie-Lea Winch	Thornfield Rugby	Warks	
2016	Sophie Tolchard	Kings Torquay	Devon	Rebecca Moorbey	St Neots	Cambs	
2017	Katherine Rednall	Felixstowe & Suffolk	Suffolk	Harriet Stevens	Kings Torquay	Devon	
2018	Izzie White	Chester Road	Worcs	Vicky Room	Bletchley Town	Bucks	
2019	Harriet Stevens	Kings Torquay	Devon	Emma Cooper	Kings Torquay	Devon	
2020 No competition due to COVID-19 pandemic							
2021	Kat Bowman	Thringstone	Leics	Alice Lovett	Oakley	Hants	
2022	Rebecca Moorbey	Parkway	Hunts	Olivia Starr	Clevedon	Som	
2023	Emily Kernick	Sherwood Park	Warks	Rebecca Moorbey	Brampton	Hunts	
2024	Millie Tuck	Poole Park	Dorset	Ruby Hill	Cleethorpes	Lincs	
2025	Izzie White	Chester Road	Worcs	Rhianna Russell	Welwyn & District	Herts	
2026	Hannah Smith	Barnwood	Glocs	Jorja Jackson	Brampton	Hunts	
