= Harriet Stevens =

English lawn and indoor bowls player

Personal information
- Nationality: British (English)

Sport
- Club: Kings BC Torquay (outdoor); Exonia (indoor)

Achievements and titles
- Highest world ranking: 11 (September 2024)
Medal record
Representing England
Hong Kong International Bowls Classic
Silver medal – second place	2023	pairs
Silver medal – second place	2024	pairs
British Isles Championships
Gold medal – first place	2023	pairs
Gold medal – first place	2024	triples
European Championships
Gold medal – first place	2024 Ayr	pairs
English Nationals
Gold medal – first place	2016	junior pairs
Gold medal – first place	2019	junior singles
Gold medal – first place	2019	fours
Gold medal – first place	2021	triples
Gold medal – first place	2022	pairs
Gold medal – first place	2023	triples

Harriet Stevens is an English former international lawn and indoor bowler, first capped by the England team in 2018. She reached a career high ranking of world number 11 in September 2024.

== Bowls career ==
=== Indoors ===
Stevens made the EIBA Junior International team in the 2018 home international series in Nottingham. In 2019, she remained in the team, which was her last year of eligibility, in addition to making the EIBA Women's Senior team the same year.

Also in 2019, Stevens won two mixed national titles, winning the mixed fours with Exonia teammates Cassidy Hampton (nee Lenton), Kieran Kniverton and Sam Tolchard and the mixed pairs, a few days later with Sam Tolchard.

=== Outdoors ===
In 2015, Stevens won the national Bowls England National Championships (mixed fours) title with Devon teammates Sophie Tolchard, Lee Haywood and Ryan Whitlock. Stevens returned the following year in 2016 and reached the final of the Bowls England National Championships (women's pairs) with Kings B.C teammate Cassidy Hampton, narrowly losing out on the title by one shot on an extra end against club teammates Sophie Tolchard and Natalie Chestney. In the same year Harriet went on to win the Bowls England National Championships (women's junior pairs), this time teaming up with Sophie Tolchard to beat Somerset in the final.

In 2018, she was named as the junior international captain and lifted the junior trophy at a home series for the ninth consecutive year. Stevens captained the team for the next three years up until her final year in 2022 (played then due to the pandemic).

Stevens bowls for arguably England's top club, the Kings Bowls Club in Torquay and in 2019, Stevens won two national titles at the English national bowls championships; the junior singles and the fours, while eight months pregnant.

In 2021, she won the triples with Sophie Tolchard and Emma Cooper and repeated the success two years later, at the 2023 Bowls England National Finals but this time partnering Tolchard and Nicole Rogers. This was her fifth national title and in between the triples championship gold medals she won the pairs with Tolchard at the 2022 Bowls England National Finals.

In November 2023, she won the silver medal in the pairs with Nicole Rogers, at the prestigious Hong Kong International Bowls Classic. The pair made history by becoming the first English women to reach the final at the Hong Kong Classic.

In 2024, Stevens won the triples title at the British Isles Bowls Championships and shortly afterwards won the pairs gold medal with Nicole Rogers, at the 2024 European Bowls Championships.

Stevens retired from international competition in July 2025.

== Personal life ==
Stevens has a child with fellow English bowls international Sam Tolchard.
