= Emily Kernick =

English bowls player

Personal information
- Nationality: British (English)
- Born: 1999 (age 26–27) England

Sport
- Sport: Bowls
- Club: Royal Leamington Spa (outdoor) / Solihull IBC (indoor)

Achievements and titles
- Highest world ranking: 1 (July 2025)
Medal record
World Indoor Championships (WB)
Gold medal – first place	2025 Aberdeen	mixed pairs
Silver medal – second place	2025 Aberdeen	singles
World Indoor Championships (WBT)
Silver medal – second place	2026 Yarmouth	mixed pairs
European Championships
Bronze medal – third place	2024 Ayr	triples
British Championships
Gold medal – first place	2025 Llandrindod Wells	fours
English Nationals
Gold medal – first place	2023	junior singles & pairs
Gold medal – first place	2024	fours
Gold medal – first place	2026	singles

Emily Kernick (born 1999) is an English international indoor bowler, who won a gold medal at the 2025 World Bowls Indoor Championships and is a national champion and has been capped by England. She reached the ranking of world number 1 in July 2025.

== Bowls career ==
Kernick came to prominence in 2023, when she won the EIBA National Under 25 singles title and won a silver medal with Harry Goodwin at the World Bowls Junior Indoor Championship. In addition, Kernick was capped by England.

Bowling for Sherwood Park, Warwickshire, she won the women's junior singles title and the women's junior pairs at the 2023 Bowls England National Finals.

In 2024, Kernick won a bronze medal at the 2024 European Bowls Championships and won the national indoor singles title at Nottingham. This qualified her to represent England at the 2025 World Bowls Indoor Championships. Kernick also reached the semi final of the National Two Wood Ladies singles.

Further success came in 2024, when bowling for Royal Leamington Spa, she won two gold medals at the 2024 Bowls England National Finals, retaining her junior pairs crown with Lily-Mae Adams and winning the women's fours to qualify for the 2025 British Championships.

Subsequently in 2025, Kernick paired with Dominic McVittie won the pairs gold medal at the 2025 World Bowls Indoor Championships in Aberdeen. She also won silver in the singles. In June she won the fours at the 2025 British Championships.
