= Harry Goodwin (bowls) =

British lawn and indoor bowler

Personal information
- Nationality: British (English)
- Born: 1997 (age 28–29)

Sport
- Sport: Lawn & indoor bowls
- Club: Appleyard BC

Achievements and titles
- Highest world ranking: 5 (September 2024)
Medal record
Men's bowls
Representing England
Hong Kong International Classic
Silver medal – second place	2025	pairs
Nationals
Gold medal – first place	2018, 2021	pairs
World Bowls Junior Indoor Championship
Gold medal – first place	2022	singles
Gold medal – first place	2022	pairs
Silver medal – second place	2023	pairs

Harry Goodwin (born 1997) is an English international lawn and Indoor bowler. He reached a career high ranking of world number 5 in September 2024.

== Bowls career ==
Goodwin began bowling at Totnes BC, when being introduced to bowls by his grandfather Reg in 2003.

Goodwin won national titles for Britain's top team Kings BC in Torquay, when winning the Club Two Fours in 2016 and 2017 and the Top Club four times from 2016 to 2019. Additionally, representing Devon he was part of the county team that won the White Rose Trophy twice and the prestigious Middleton Cup four times.

He has twice won the Junior pairs title at the English national bowls championships in 2018 and 2021 and in-between was called up to the senior England team in 2019.

In February 2022, he won 'England male rising star' at the Bowls England Awards Night. Later that summer, he won the Champion of champions, when bowling for his new club Appleyard BC. He moved clubs from Kings to Appleyard because he had moved to Kent with his partner.

At the end of 2022, he won the men's singles and pairs titles at the IIBC Championships. In 2023, he represented England at the IIBC Championships in East Kilbride. In 2024, Goodwin was defeated by Jamie Walker in the men's singles final at the national championships.
