= Bowls England National Championships (men's junior singles) =

British lawn bowls event

The men's junior singles is one of the events at the annual Bowls England National Championships.

== Venues ==
- 1975–1982 (Saffrons Club, Eastbourne)
- 1983–1987, 1991–2013 (Worthing Bowls Club, Beach House Park)
- 1988–1990 (Bristol BC)
- 2014–present (Victoria Park, Royal Leamington Spa)

== Sponsors ==
- 1980–1987 (Kodak)
- 1988–1990 (Bristol & West Building Society)
- 2023–2025 (Aviva)

== Past winners ==
Year	Champion	Club	County	Runner-up	Club	County	Score	Ref
1974	David Cutler	St. Austell	Cornwall	Tony Allcock	Belgrave	Leics	21–17	
1975	Tony Allcock	Belgrave	Leics	David Snell	St Austell	Cornwall	21–19	
1976	Jimmy Hobday	Boscombe Cliff	Hants	Bob Rodwell	Hatfield	Herts	21–20	
1977	Tony Allcock	Belgrave	Leics	Gary Smith	Old Coleians	Kent	21–13	
1978	Alec Atkinson	Middlesbrough	Yorks	David Dunford	RAE	Hants	21–19	
1979	Peter Mattravers	Ilminster	Som	Derek Plater	Aylesbury Town	Bucks	21–10	
1980	Graham Spencer	Temple	Surrey	Russell Kemp	Fleming Park	Hants	21-15	
1981	Tony Allcock MBE	Cheltenham	Glocs	Keith Blackman	Essex County	Essex	21–12	
1982	Ian Grady	Gaywood Park	Norfolk	David Henley	Palmers	Durham	21–10	
1983	Andrew Irons	Knighton Victoria	Leics	Gerry Smyth	Paddington	Middx	21–19	
1984	Brett Morley	Plessey	Notts	Jim Squires	Fleet	Hants	21–14	
1985	Jeffrey Bates	Falcon	Essex	John Simmons	Garston	Herts	21–8	
1986	Chris Ackland	Brentham	Middx	Paul Sharman	Oxford City & County	Oxon	21–18	
1987	John Rednall	Marlborough Ipswich	Suffolk	Iain Boyle	Weybridge	Surrey	21–12	
1988	Iain Boyle	Bert Keech	Yorks	Mervyn King	Hunstanton	Norfolk	21–15	
1989	Alan Darling	Worthing	Sussex	Mervyn King	Hunstanton	Norfolk	25–24	
1990	Neil Westlake	Winscombe	Som	Mark Bantock	Gerrards Cross	Bucks	25–21	
1991	Barry Jenkins	Hounslow Sports	Middx	Nathan Farrant	Exmouth Madeira	Devon	21–12	
1992	Stuart Thomas	Blossomfield	Warks	Karl Jameson	St. Georges	Northum	21–12	
1993	Les Gillett	Cheltenham	Glocs	Stuart Popple	Parkway	Hunts	21–13	
1994	Steven Mead	Dunstable Town	Beds	David Baxter	Wigton	Cumbria	21–16	
1995	David Bell	Ely Sports & Social	Cambs	Ian Mayne	Bolton	Lancs	21–15	
1996	Jason Parkinson	Bolton	Lancs	Ian Drew	Stenalees	Cornwall	21–5	
1997	Neil Chandler	Victory Park	Glocs	Clive James	Canterbury	Kent	21–6	
1998	Nick Brett	White Hart	Hunts	David Bolt	Silksworth	Durham	21–17	
1999	Graham Shadwell	Cooper Avon	Wilts	Robert Newman	Reading	Berks	21–7	
2000	Mark Bishopp	Weybridge	Surrey	Dean Hemming	Worcester	Worcs	21–15	
2001	David Hubbard	Hove and Kingsway	Sussex	Russell Francis	Spencer Moulton	Wilts	21–13	
2002	Simon Gilbert	Avenue Leamington	Warks	Chris Gale	Acton Bridge	Lancs	21–18	
2003	Tom Cawdell	Luton Town	Beds	Nick Welsh	Rover Cowley	Oxon	21–18	
2004	Robert Chisholm	Northern Electric	Northum	Stephen Winter	House on the Green	Norfolk	21–16	
2005	Mark Dawes	Bolton	Lancs	Stuart Holland	Rosemount	Sussex	2–0* sets	
2006	Matthew Coppen	Royston	Herts	Mark Dawes	Bolton	Lancs	2–1* sets	
2007	Stuart Holland	Rosemount	Sussex	Josh Hadfield	Budleigh Salterton	Devon	21–12	
2008	Aaron Sexton	Preston	Sussex	Ben Paulley	Greenhill	Dorset	21–14	
2009	Jamie Chestney	Hunstanton	Norfolk	Tristan Morton	Parkway	Hunts	21–8	
2010	Mark Nullmeyers	Elm Park	Essex	Tristan Morton	White Hart	Hunts	21–13	
2011	Jamie Walker	Northampton West End	Northants	Kyle Mallandain	Desborough	Berks	21–16	
2012	Martin Spencer	Royal Mail Cart	Lincs	Jamie Walker	Northampton West End	Northants	21–20	
2013	Jamie Walker	Northampton West End	Northants	Liam Pearcey	Rugby	Warks	21–15	
2014	Martin Puckett	Greenhill	Dorset	Tom Muir	Harpenden	Herts	21–11	
2015	Jamie Barker	St Neots	Cambs	Perry Martin	Milton Regis	Kent	21–7	
2016	Jamie Walker	Northampton West End	Northants	Jack Emmerson	Cavaliers	Notts	21–2	
2017	Travis Meller	Shanklin	IOW	Bernard Byles	Reading	Berk	21–20	
2018	Dan Mills	County Arts	Norfolk	Anthony Booth-Young	Bolton	Lancs	21–18	
2019	Jason Avery	Folkestone Park	Kent	Tom Newman	Avon	Wilts	21–11	
2020 No competition due to COVID-19 pandemic								
2021	Jordan Philpott	Royal Mail Cart	Lincs	Harry Goodwin	Kings Torquay	Devon	21–16	
2022	Daniel Ellicott	Avenue Leamington	Warks	Lloyd Milligan	Heaton Hall	Lancs	21–20	
2023	Tom Holmes	Ross-on-Wye	Herefords	Oli Collins	Ilminster	Som	21–11	
2024	Kieran Jaycock	Broadway	Bucks	Dylan Martin	Garston	Herts	21–9	
2025	Charlie Beeton	Felixstowe & Suffolk	Suffolk	Luke Bell	Sports Centre, So'ton	Hants	21–14	
2026	Finley Williamson	Cheltenham	Glocs	David Morrison	Wadebridge	Cornwall	21–13	
