= 2023 Bowls England National Finals =

British lawn bowls event

- Venue: Victoria Park, Leamington Spa
- Location: Royal Leamington Spa; Warwickshire
- Dates: 10–27 August 2023

The 2023 Bowls England National Finals sponsored by Aviva, are a series of lawn bowls events to determine the National champions of England. The Championships are being held from 10 August to 27 August 2023, at the Royal Leamington Spa Bowls Club in Victoria Park, Leamington Spa. They are organised by Bowls England, and are open to lawn bowlers who qualify via their County Championships.

Lewis King and Stef Branfield won the singles titles respectively.

== Results summary ==
=== Elite events ===
Event	Winner	Runner-up	Score
men's singles	Lewis King (Appleyard, Kent)	Darren Allsopp (New Lount, Leics)	21–10
men's 2w singles	Mark Ireland (Avenue Coventry, Warwickshire)	Alan Geary (Boscombe Cliff, Hampshire)	16–10
men's cofc singles	Graham Ashby (Nuneaton, Warwickshire)	Phil Harvey (St Georges Dragons, Northumberland)	21–13
men's pairs	Nick Wardle; Joe Dawson (Kingscroft, Leics)	Steve Gunnell; Ed Morris (Essex County, Essex)	16–15
men's triples	Michael Gomme; Matthew Hyde; Andrew Briden (Gerrards Cross, Bucks)	Simon Kittle; Steve Gunnell; Ed Morris (Essex County, Essex)	15–14
men's fours	Steve Hill; Harry Mycock; Dominic McVittie; Martin Spencer (Royal Mail Cart, Lincolnshire)	Nick Wardle; Jonathan Green; Chris Moore; Joe Dawson (Kingscroft, Leicestershire)	18–13
women's singles	Stef Branfield (Clevedon, Somerset)	Jayne Christie (Potton, Bedfordshire)	21–16
women's 2w singles	Laura Holden (Clevedon, Somerset)	Shannon Maughan (Bletchley Town, Buckinghamshire)	17–10
women's cofc singles	Annalisa Dunham (Carters Park, Lincolnshire)	Donna Rock (Sherborne, Dorset)	21–5
women's pairs	Carol Gaskins; Donna Grant (Oxford City & County, Oxfordshire)	Gill Grantham; Alison Spreadborough (Plymouth Sir Francis Drake, Devon)	19–10
women's triples	Sophie Tolchard; Nicole Rogers; Harriett Stevens (Kings, Devon)	Rachel Gingell; Kelly Jenkins; Pam Garden (Egham, Surrey)	20–8
women's fours	Jemma Tuohy; Yasmina Hasan; Elizabeth Anderson; Debbie Souter (Egham, Surrey)	Sally Gilbert; Angela Service; Helen Moore; Lynn Orlando (Didcot, Berkshire)	18–17

=== Other events ===
Event	Winner	Runner-up	Score
men's junior singles	Tom Holmes (Ross-on-Wye, Herefordshire)	Oli Collins (Ilminster, Somerset)	21–11
men's junior pairs	Oli Collins; Liam White; Somerset	Ryan Brannan; Callum Hodgson; Cumbria	29–7
men's senior singles	Steve Poyner (Vines Park, Worcestershire)	Graham Ashby (Nuneaton, Warwickshire)	21–3
men's senior pairs	Philip Russell; Jerry Rumball; Hertfordshire	Michael Jelfs; Phillip Gladden; Oxfordshire	27–3
men's senior fours	Gary Clark; Martin Sampson; Simon Greenwood; David McCallum (Camberley, Surrey)	Mike Stray; Roy Elkington; David Brammer; Kevin Lewis (Branston, Lincolnshire)	33–5
women's junior singles	Emily Kernick (Sherwood Park, Warwickshire)	Rebecca Moorbey (Brampton, Huntingdonshire)	21–9
women's junior pairs	Lily-Mae Adams; Emily Kernick (Warwickshire)	Molly Feetham; Ruby Hill (Lincolnshire)	20–19
women's senior singles	Kate Kyle (Shepshed Town, Leicestershire)	Sue Allen (Swinton, Yorkshire)	21–17
women's senior pairs	Linda Churchman; Cheryl Salisbury; Cambridgeshire	Margaret Smith; Teresa Orriss; Surrey	13–10
women's senior fours	Leen Hampshire; Carole Wolton; Sandra Aldridge; Anne Bernard (Ryde Marina, Isle of Wight)	Lesley Holmes; Di Wilson-Rogers; Barbara Heath; Lin Mountain (Dunholme St Giles, Lincolnshire)	17–7
mixed pairs	Wayne Willgress; Rebecca Willgress; Norfolk	Grant Burgess; Maddie Burgess; Worcestershire	18–13
mixed fours	Chris Yeomans; Kayleigh Proctor; Rachel Cartwright; Simon Richardson; Northumberland	Chloe Brett; Rebecca Moorbey; Glyn Milbourne; Nick Brett; Huntingdonshire	21–17

=== Team events ===
Event	Winner	Runner-up	Score
Middleton Cup (men)	Lincolnshire	Berkshire	115–98
Top Club (men)	Appleyard BC, Kent	Shanklin, Isle of Wight	3–2
Balcomb Trophy (men)	Essex	Cumbria	45–36
White Rose Trophy (men)	Kent	Cambridgeshire	46–41
Club Two Fours (men)	Shanklin, Isle of Wight	New Lount, Leicestershire	34–31
Walker Cup (women)	Lincolnshire	Norfolk	32–27
Amy Rose Bowl (women)	Kent	Devon	38–37
Johns Trophy (women)	Devon	Surrey	116–110
Top Club (women)	Kings BC Torquay, Devon	Egham BC, Surrey	2–2 (63–53)
