= Bowls England National Championships (men's senior pairs) =

British lawn bowls event

The men's senior pairs is one of the events at the annual Bowls England National Championships.

The event is an age restricted men's event for over 60s (55 from 1988-2025).

== Venues ==
- 2021–present (Victoria Park, Royal Leamington Spa)

== Sponsors ==
- 2026–2026 (Pegasus Homes)

== Past winners ==
| Year | Champions | County | Runners-up | County | Score | Ref |
|---|---|---|---|---|---|---|
| 1974 | Frank Farey & Arthur Parkin | Middx | | | | |
| 1975 | Bill Stowe & Fred Jenkins | Warwicks | Arthur Green & Les Banks | Sussex | 20–15 | |
| 1976 | Les Traves & Ivor Boys | Kent | Eric Thulborn & Alf Page | Cambs | | |
| 1977 | E. Rayner & Fred Summers | Worcs | | | | |
| 1978 | F. Ash & H. Stevenson | Surrey | | | | |
| 1979 | E. C. Weston & E. C. Websell | Hants | | | | |
| 1980 | G. C. Collinson & W. Hughes | Glocs | | | | |
| 1981 | J. Adams & A. Whitehead | Bucks | | | | |
| 1982 | Jim Grigor & Bernard Read | Lincs | | Middx | 24–11 | |
| 1983 | T. S. Fenn & A. P. Lucas | Suffolk | | | | |
| 1984 | Wilf Firby & Harry Wadham | Som | John Nunn & Peter Hills | Suffolk | 21–20 | |
| 1985 | B. Walker & R. Kivell | Devon | | | | |
| 1986 | | | | | | |
| 1987 | Reg Theobald & Cyril Morgan | Middx | Joe Hughes & Raymond Wall | Northumb | 19-18 | |
| 1988 | Alfred Baylis & Tony Russell | Worcs | Bev Thompson & Cecil Exton | Wilts | 25-16 | |
| 1989 | Cyril Bowers & Derek Mee | Notts | Gordon Townsend & Harry Reynolds | Warwicks | 27-16 | |
| 1990 | Reg Jackson & Barney Fernandes | Wilts | Ray Watson & Reg Paine | Middx | 22-12 | |
| 1991 | Ken Manderson & Peter Line | Hants | T. C. Clipston & Terry James | Northants | 25-22 | |
| 1992 | R. S. Bell & J. Stothard | Durham | W. D. Gee & D. Lewis | Bucks | 20-9 | |
| 1993 | Ken Manderson & Peter Line | Hants | Edward Hayward & Walter Hayward | Sussex | 23-11 | |
| 1994 | Brian Arnold & Don Griffin | Hunts | Henry Booth & Alan Leach | Lancs | 15-14 | |
| 1995 | F. A. Palmer & K. Broughton | Sussex | N. Chamberlain & W. Faulkner | Herts | 20-16 | |
| 1996 | Bernard Walsham & Alan Walsham | Lincs | Ken Wardle & Robert Burch | Devon | 17-16 | |
| 1997 | Arthur Peacock & Luke Went | Essex | Michael Truran & Ian Gooding | Sussex | 28-8 | |
| 1998 | Pat Pinnegar & Roy Hennessy | Glocs/Som | Brian Miller & Dennis Alderton | Sussex | 22-16 | |
| 1999 | Michael Haywood & John Godden | Leics | Derek Balfour & Peter Bryant | Berks | 20-14 | |
| 2000 | Chris Reynolds & Ian Watson | Sussex | Douglas Bale & Derek James | Devon | 24-11 | |
| 2001 | F. Smith & R. Walters | Cornwall | D. Weston & D. Crowson | Northants | 23-20 | |
| 2002 | David Macey & David Hynard | Som | Pat Riley & Lyn James | Essex | 28-18 | |
| 2003 | Alan Waite & Peter Picknell | Bucks | Robert Clews & David Snell | Wilts | 22-21 | |
| 2004 | Ken Marsh & Barry Bendall | Hants | J. Wilson & M. Crafer | Essex | 27-11 | |
| 2005 | Attilio Ciampini & Robert Yeamans | Middx | B. Nicholls & J. Dobson | Hants | 29-8 | |
| 2006 | John Crabb & Barry Patterson | Dorset | Alan Cawdell & Len Wildman | Herts | 20–17 | |
| 2007 | William Hamilton & Brian Pigott | Warwicks | Gordon Niven & Graham Booth | Lancs | 30–15 | |
| 2008 | Vic Cole & Malcolm Stark | Essex | Keith Corris & Keith Corris | Cornwall | 21–20 | |
| 2009 | Don Sheriff & Peter Adams | Herts | Roger Martin & Tony Scarr | Hunts | 27–11 | |
| 2010 | David Welsh & James Morley | Sussex | David McManus & Anthony Little | Cumbria | 25–21 | |
| 2011 | David Parr & Charlie Gay | Cornwall | John Abson & Alan Cawdell | Herts | 19–13 | |
| 2012 | Richard Hall & Adrian Burbridge | Worcs | Eddie Hughes & Ray Breame | Cumbria | 25–8 | |
| 2013 | David Snell, Mel Biggs & Paul Sloman | Wilts | Robert Fuller & John Haines | Northants | 20–18 | |
| 2014 | Les Jinks & Dave Brennan | Derbyshire | Alan Ley & Mike Peterson | Oxon | 20–18 | |
| 2015 | David Snell & Mel Biggs | Wilts | Barry Williams & Tony Aubrey | Berks | 26–13 | |
| 2016 | John Bell & Rick Gallagher | Cumbria | Roy Burnett & David Hanger | Dorset | 21–14 | |
| 2017 | Dave Labrum & Malcolm Drage | Bucks | Ian Watson & Keith Holman | Sussex | 23–16 | |
| 2018 | Paul Comley & Colin Whitehead | Oxon | Ronnie Thomas & Kevin Williams | Cornwall | 24–7 | |
| 2019 | Dave Labrum & Malcolm Drage | Bucks | Martin Smith & Mark Atkins | Herefords | 22–15 | |
| 2020 No competition due to COVID-19 pandemic | | | | | | |
| 2021 | Stuart Stephens & Jim Garner | Dorset | Howard Watts & Raymond Gaskins | Oxfordshire | 17–10 | |
| 2022 | Steve Smith & Graham Ashby | Warwicks | Steve Parr & Ken Weyand | Kent | 19–6 | |
| 2023 | Philip Russell & Jerry Rumball | Herts | Michael Jelfs & Phillip Gladden | Oxfordshire | 27–3 | |
| 2024 | Ken Sawyer & Tim Bloomer | Glocs | Richard Spriggs & Steve Gunnell | Essex | 22–21 | |
| 2025 | Phil Hackett & Robert Honeywell | Devon | Gren Richardson & Bob Mcavelia | Northumb | 17–15 | |
| 2026 | John Keat & Chris Daniels | Hants | Phil Downs & Stuart Evans | Devon | 21–10 | |
