= Bowls England National Championships (women's senior singles) =

British lawn bowls event

The women's senior singles is one of the events at the annual Bowls England National Championships.

The event is an age restricted wommen's event aged 60 and over (55 from 1988 to 2025).

== Venues ==
- 2021–present (Victoria Park, Royal Leamington Spa)

== Sponsors ==
- 2026–2026 (Pegasus Homes)

== Past winners ==
Year	Champion	Runner-up	Score	Ref
1974	Clarice Reynolds (Nottinghamshire)			
1975	Mrs G Burrell (Sussex)			
1976	Mrs A Shipton (Dorset)			
1977	Miss E Ward (Surrey)			
1978	Mrs D. Smith (Lincolnshire)	Mrs P. Cobourne (Cambs)	21–20	
1979	Mrs N Caudle (Gloucestershire)			
1980	Mrs S Hurley (Cornwall)			
1981	Mrs H. Goddard (Gloucestershire)	J. Messenger (Cumbria)		
1982	Joyce Duller (Cambridgeshire)	Mary Simmonds (Suffolk)	21–10	
1983	Mrs K Steer (Warwicks)			
1984	Hilda Hill (Warwicks)	Freda Swanwick (Lincs)	21–18	
1985	Mrs A Joyner (Somerset)	Joyce Ward (Norfolk)	21–20	
1986	Mrs K Green (Hampshire)	Jean Gilbert (Northants)		
1987	Doreen Fletcher (Hampshire)	Noreen Wardell (Surrey)	21–18	
1988	Christine Sissons (Yorkshire)	Gwen Daniel (Cornwall)	21–17	
1989	Sylvia Parker (Northants)	Joyce Collins (Sussex)	21–17	
1990	Iris Roberts (Bedfordshire)	Margaret Ketley (Hertfordshire)	21–11	
1991	A Kerslake (Hertfordshire)	S Langdon (Somerset)		
1992	Mavis Steele (Middx)	Jean Woodrough (Wilts)		
1993	G Lloyd (Worcestershire)	D Hutton (Durham)		
1994	Margaret Dyer (Somerset)	Maria Shuttleworth (Northumberland)		
1995	June Foster (Yorkshire)	Rosemary Ludar-Smith (Essex)		
1996	Margaret Dyer (Somerset)	Pam Jones (Surrey)		
1997	Wendy Barnard (Devon)	Daphne Pratt (Hertfordshire)	21–10	
1998	Wendy Barnard (Devon)	Joan Mason (Durham)		
1999	Rosemary Ludar-Smith (Essex)	Elizabeth Garrity (Cumbria)		
2000	Daphne Pratt (Hertfordshire)	Doreen Smith (Cambridgeshire)		
2001	Sue Springell (Buckinghamshire)	Nova Edwards (Somerset)		
2002	Elizabeth Garrity (Cumbria)	Carol Penson (Oxfordshire)		
2003	Sandra Maguire (Nottinghamshire)	Gloria Thomas (Cornwall)		
2004	Val Ayres (Gloucestershire)	Wendy Anderson (Wiltshire)		
2005	Wendy Anderson (Wiltshire)	Di Wilkinson (Warwickshire)		
2006	Janet Scott (Warwickshire)	Val Bingley (Essex)		
2007	Janet Hardiy (Wiltshire)	Sue Harriott (Devon)		
2008	Jayne Roylance (Norfolk)	Ann Anderson (Durham)		
2009	Teresa Pearson (Durham)	Andrea Dickinson (Suffolk)		
2010	Wendy Davies (Sussex)	Pauline Proud (Isle of Wight)		
2011	Liz Garrity (Cumbria)	Carol Gaskins (Oxfordshire)		
2012	Sue Davies (Worcestershire)	Sue Springell (Buckinghamshire)		
2013	Moira Self (Suffolk)	Pauline Proud (Isle of Wight)		
2014	Alex Jacobs (Wiltshire)	Sue Latham (Gloucestershire)		
2015	Alex Jacobs (Wiltshire)	Eleanor Benvie (Lancashire)		
2016	Ann Anderson (Durham)	Bet Aubrey (Berkshire)		
2017	Jenny Dempsey (Northamptonshire)	Brenda Bowyer (Essex)		
2018	Sue Allen (Yorkshire)	Andrea Dickinson (Norfolk)		
2019	Rachel Mackriell (Sussex)	Janet Eames (Nottinghamshire)		
2020 No competition due to COVID-19 pandemic				
2021	Sandra Maguire (Forest Oaks, Notts)	Janet Williamson (Hyde Abbey, Hants)	21–18	
2022	Anne Bernard (Ryde Marina, IOW)	Caroline Cullum (Cleethorpes, Lincs)	21–12	
2023	Kate Kyle (Shepshed Town, Leics)	Sue Allen (Swinton, Yorks)	21–17	
2024	Fiona Waters (Victoria WSM, Som)	Caroline Campion (Banbury Central, Oxon)	21–15	
2025	Pauline Clark (Egham, Surrey)	Brenda Bowyer (Rochford, Essex)	21–12	
2026	Alison Dring (Wellingborough, Northants)	Sue Allen (Thirsk Athletic, Yorks)	21–14	
