= Bowls England National Championships (Amy Rose Bowl) =

British lawn bowls event

The Amy Rose Bowl is one of the events at the annual Bowls England National Championships. It is an Inter-County Double Rink Competition for female players aged 31 or under.

== Past winners ==
| Year | Champion | Runner-up | Score | Ref |
|---|---|---|---|---|
| 2000 | Cumbria | Kent | 51–32 | |
| 2001 | Cumbria | Devon | 43–28 | |
| 2002 | Huntingdonshire | Lincolnshire | 39–32 | |
| 2003 | Lincolnshire | Huntingdonshire | | |
| 2004 | Cumbria | Sussex | 47–23 | |
| 2005 | Surrey | Devon | | |
| 2006 | Surrey | Lincolnshire | 61–27 | |
| 2007 | Devon | Surrey | | |
| 2008 | Yorkshire | Somerset | 38–34 | |
| 2009 | Devon | Surrey | | |
| 2010 | Essex | Yorkshire | | |
| 2011 | Devon | Kent | | |
| 2012 | Devon | Somerset | | |
| 2013 | Devon | Surrey | | |
| 2014 | Sussex | Surrey | | |
| 2015 | Surrey | Somerset | | |
| 2016 | Somerset | Kent | | |
| 2017 | Devon | Somerset | | |
| 2018 | Wiltshire | Cornwall | | |
| 2019 | Northamptonshire | Somerset | | |
| 2020 No competition due to COVID-19 pandemic | | | | |
| 2021 | Somerset | Hertfordshire | 48–33 | |
| 2022 | Kent | Northamptonshire | 47–32 | |
| 2023 | Kent | Devon | 38–37 | |
| 2024 | Kent | Lincolnshire | 42–30 | |
| 2025 | Somerset | East Anglians | 40–37 | |
| 2026 | Surrey | Leicestershire | 27–15 | |
