= Bowls England National Championships (women's senior fours) =

British lawn bowls event

The women's senior fours is one of the events at the annual Bowls England National Championships. The event was inaugurated in 2017.

== Venues ==
- 2021–present (Victoria Park, Royal Leamington Spa)

== Past winners ==
Year	Champions	Club	County	Runners-up	Club	County	Ref
2017	Chris Thomas, Jenny Goodman; Kathy Green, Brenda Davies	Hurstpierpoint	Sussex	Joan Welch, Aileen Weaver; Shirley Bradbury, June Mills	Riverain	Herts	
2018	Lesley Johnson, Brenda Plumpton; Hazel Marke, Margaret Holden	Alton Social	Hants	Carole Baker, Joyce Webster; Jackie Devitt, Brenda Whitehead	Norfolk BC	Norfolk	
2019	Dawn Grisley, Maz Fisher; Jenny Ralph, Jackie Bryant	Potton	Beds	Rachel Mackriell, Mary Bray; Julia Fordham, Denise Hodd	Polegrove	Sussex	
2020	No competition due to COVID-19 pandemic						
2021	Kirsty Cox, Anne Burchell; Caroline Cullum, Glenys Bolt	Cleethorpes	Lincs	Lesley Johnson, Alice Atwell; Hazel Marke, Margaret Holden	Alton Social	Hants	
2022	Christine Beamish, Sue Bard-Bodek; Sal Butcher, Sue Bernard	Borough Of Eye	Suffolk	Kirsty Cox, Anne Burchell; Caroline Cullum, Glenys Bolt, Chris Love	Cleethorpes	Lincs	
2023	Leen Hampshire, Carole Wolton; Sandra Aldridge, Anne Bernard	Ryde Marina	IOW	Lesley Holmes, Di Wilson-Rogers; Barbara Heath, Lin Mountain	Dunholme St Giles	Lincs	
2024	Lesley Johnson, Alice Atwell; Hazel Marke, Margaret Holden	Alton Social	Hants	Dawn Horne, Caroline Edwards; Jenny Wickens, Janice White, Anita Cowdrill	Royal Leamington Spa	Warks	
2025	Dawn Horne, Anita Cowdrill, Jenny Wickens, Janice White	Royal Leamington Spa	Warwicks	Sue Entwistle, Alison Phillips, Jean Smith, Marie Dowson	Guisborough Priory	Yorks	
2026	Elizabeth Anderson, Kate Capon, Shan Maylin, Debbie Souter	Southey	Surrey	Alison Watt, Jo Hearsum, Margaret Adcock, Denise Hodd	Polegrove	Sussex	
