= Bowls England National Championships (Johns Trophy) =

British lawn bowls event

The Johns Trophy is one of the events at the annual Bowls England National Championships.

It is an Inter-County Championship for six rinks of women's teams.

== Past winners ==
| Year | Champion | Runner-up | Score | Ref |
|---|---|---|---|---|
| 1934 | Surrey | Kent | | |
| 1935 | Surrey | Sussex | | |
| 1936 | Sussex | Middlesex | | |
| 1937 | Surrey | Middlesex | | |
| 1938 | Middlesex | Surrey | | |
| 1939 | Devon | Surrey | | |
1940–1945 No competition due to war
| 1946 | Surrey | Devon | | |
| 1947 | Surrey | Kent | | |
| 1948 | Surrey | Essex | | |
| 1949 | Surrey | Essex | | |
| 1950 | Hampshire | Warwickshire | | |
| 1951 | Devon | Durham | | |
| 1952 | Kent | Northumberland | | |
| 1953 | Surrey | Hertfordshire | | |
| 1954 | Surrey | Warwickshire | | |
| 1955 | Kent | Leicestershire | | |
| 1956 | Warwickshire | Devon | | |
| 1957 | Surrey | Warwickshire | | |
| 1958 | Devon | Durham | | |
| 1959 | Durham | Surrey | | |
| 1960 | Nottinghamshire | Devon | | |
| 1961 | Nottinghamshire | Kent | | |
| 1962 | Sussex | Warwickshire | | |
| 1963 | Surrey | Durham | | |
| 1964 | Sussex | Warwickshire | | |
| 1965 | Suffolk | Devon | | |
| 1966 | Devon | Nottinghamshire | | |
| 1967 | Warwickshire | Devon | | |
| 1968 | Durham | Devon | | |
| 1969 | Nottinghamshire | Surrey | | |
| 1970 | Suffolk | Devon | | |
| 1971 | Middlesex | Suffolk | | |
| 1972 | Surrey | Warwickshire | | |
| 1973 | Middlesex | Northamptonshire | | |
| 1974 | Durham | Devon | | |
| 1975 | Middlesex | Suffolk | | |
| 1976 | Surrey | Suffolk | | |
| 1977 | Durham | Somerset | | |
| 1978 | Surrey | Cambridgeshire | | |
| 1979 | Durham | Surrey | | |
| 1980 | Devon | Northamptonshire | | |
| 1981 | Middlesex | Durham | | |
| 1982 | Surrey | Cumbria | | |
| 1983 | Yorkshire | Kent | | |
| 1984 | Kent | Suffolk | | |
| 1985 | Norfolk | Middlesex | | |
| 1986 | Surrey | Durham | | |
| 1987 | Norfolk | Devon | | |
| 1988 | Lincolnshire | Hampshire | | |
| 1989 | Sussex | Yorkshire | | |
| 1990 | Kent | Nottinghamshire | | |
| 1991 | Norfolk | Gloucestershire | | |
| 1992 | Yorkshire | Middlesex | | |
| 1993 | Leicestershire | Kent | | |
| 1994 | Middlesex | Yorkshire | | |
| 1995 | Wiltshire | Sussex | | |
| 1996 | Somerset | Norfolk | | |
| 1997 | Yorkshire | Somerset | | |
| 1998 | Surrey | Leicestershire | | |
| 1999 | Essex | Durham | | |
| 2000 | Surrey | Somerset | | |
| 2001 | Kent | Norfolk | | |
| 2002 | Warwickshire | Devon | | |
| 2003 | Surrey | Hampshire | | |
| 2004 | Kent | Devon | | |
| 2005 | Essex | Hampshire | | |
| 2006 | Lincolnshire | Middlesex | | |
| 2007 | Cambridgeshire | Devon | | |
| 2008 | Hampshire | Hertfordshire | | |
| 2009 | Nottinghamshire | Oxfordshire | | |
| 2010 | Hertfordshire | Somerset | | |
| 2011 | Hampshire | Devon | | |
| 2012 | Lincolnshire | Devon | | |
| 2013 | Devon | Suffolk | | |
| 2014 | Surrey | Devon | | |
| 2015 | Surrey | Leicestershire | | |
| 2016 | Lincolnshire | Kent | | |
| 2017 | Kent | Norfolk | | |
| 2018 | Surrey | Wiltshire | | |
| 2019 | Surrey | Wiltshire | | |
| 2020 No competition due to COVID-19 pandemic | | | | |
| 2021 | Devon | Surrey | 113–111 | |
| 2022 | Lincolnshire | Surrey | 145–92 | |
| 2023 | Devon | Surrey | 116–110 | |
| 2024 | Lincolnshire | Somerset | 125–111 | |
| 2025 | Devon | Northamptonshire | 111–65 | |
| 2026 | Leicestershire | Surrey | 101-92 | |
