= Stef Branfield =

English female lawn and indoor bowler

Personal information
- Nationality: British (English)
- Born: c.1993

Sport
- Sport: Lawn / indoor bowls
- Club: Clevedon BC

Achievements and titles
- Highest world ranking: 14 (November 2025)
Medal record
Women's lawn bowls
Representing England
European Championships
Gold medal – first place	2022 Ayr	singles
Gold medal – first place	2022 Ayr	pairs
British Bowls Championships
Gold medal – first place	2026 Ayr	fours
English Nationals
Gold medal – first place	2021, 2023, 2025	singles
Gold medal – first place	2021	singles 2w
Gold medal – first place	2024	cofc
Gold medal – first place	2025	fours

Stephanie Branfield also known as Stef Branfield (born c.1993) is an English female lawn bowls international. She reached a career high ranking of world number 29 in June 2025.

== Bowls career ==
Branfield has represented England at bowls but came to significant prominence at the 2021 Bowls England National Finals when she won two English National titles representing the Clevdon Bowls Club and Somerset. The first title was the prestigious singles, where she beat Chris Mitchell of Wiltshire 21–16. A few days later she reached the final of the two wood singles, beating Katherine Hawes 16–10.

In 2022, she won double gold at the European Bowls Championships, winning the singles and pairs titles.

In 2023, she won the women's singles for the second time, during the 2023 Bowls England National Finals, defeating Jayne Christie in the final and in 2024 won the champion of champions title. A fifth and sixth title was won, when claiming the women's singles (her third singles title in five years) and fours in 2025.

== Family ==
Her father is former England international bowler Pip Branfield.
