= Bowls England National Championships (men's senior singles) =

British lawn bowls event

The men's senior singles is one of the events at the annual Bowls England National Championships.

The event is an age restricted men's event aged 60 and over (55 from 1988 to 2025).

== Venues ==
- 1974–1987 (Torquay)
- 1988–1988 (Shanklin)
- 1989–1991 (East Cowes)
- 1992–1995 (Wellingborough)
- 1996–1996 (The Park, Nottingham)
- 1997–1997 (Bristol)
- 1999–1999 (Guildford)
- 2000–2000 (Nottingham)
- 2021–present (Victoria Park, Royal Leamington Spa)

== Sponsors ==
- 1974–1987 (Saga)
- 1988–1991 (Warners Bembridge Country Club)
- 1992–1995 (Sanatogen)
- 1997–1999 (Cornhill Insurance)
- 2026–2026 (Pegasus Homes)

== Past winners ==
Year	Champion	Club	County	Runner-up	Club	County	Score	Ref
1974	V. E. Bullock		Hants					
1975	Ted Wood	Sunningdale	Berks					
1976	Sid Andrews	Royston	Herts	A. Blythe	County Arts	Norfolk	21–20	
1977	H. V. Wisdom		Norfolk					
1978	Fred Summers	Worcester	Worcs					
1979	F. James		Northumb					
1980	B. Walker		Devon					
1981	H. W. J. Clarke		Wilts	Tony van Spall		Warwicks	–	
1982	C. Bussey		Northants					
1983	E. R. Bundy		Hants	J. Stone		Lincs	21–14	
1984	Reg Theobald	Wembley	Middx	Sandy Watt Morlands	Morlands	Som	21–14	
1985	Reg Theobald	Wembley	Middx	Ken Terris	County Officers	Kent	21–17	
1986								
1987	Dennis Nicholls	Kirkley Park	Suffolk	Roy Rickard	Plymstock	Devon	21–18	
1988	Geoff Readman	Worcester Co-op	Worcs	Bernard Seabourne	Newquay	Cornwall	21-19	
1989	David Bryant CBE	Clevedon	Som	Barney Fernandes	Swindon	Wilts	25-23	
1990	David Bryant CBE	Clevedon	Som	Alf Chambers	Eye	Suffolk	25-13	
1991	Peter Towers	Fitz Park, Keswick	Cumbria	Dennis Hilton	Larsen	Essex	21-5	
1992	Peter Picknell	Feltham Ex-Servicemen	Middx	Bill Francis	Watford	Herts	21-13	
1993	Jack Davies	Tarring Priory	Sussex	Allan Hall	Watford	Herts	21-18	
1994	Terry James	Thrapston	Northants	C. J. Lees	Woburn Sands	Bucks	21-4	
1995	Robin Walters	Redruth	Cornwall	Jack Ferguson	Angus Sports	Northumb	21-20	
1996	Gary Tyas	Tongham	Surrey	Eddie Furze	Clevedon Promenade	Som	21-18	
1997	Colin Haydon	Swindon Westlecot	Wilts	Colin Owen	Tunbridge Wells	Kent	21-14	
1998	David Richardson	Roebuck	Herts	Peter Gurney	Priory	Beds	21-15	
1999	Peter Line	Atherley	Hants	lan Mayne	Acton Bridge	Lancs	21-15	
2000	Barney Fernandes	Swindon	Wilts	Terry James	Thrapston	Northants	21-15	
2001	Anthony Bishop	Metropolitan Police	Kent	Michael Haywood	Kingscroft	Leics	21-17	
2002	Barney Fernandes	Swindon	Wilts	Kevin Philip	Boscombe Cliff	Hants	21-7	
2003	Barrie Forse	Greyfriars	Glos	Graham Skinner	Ottershaw	Surrey	21-18	
2004	Dave Perrin	Falmouth	Cornwall	Geoffrey Green	Wolvey	Warks	21-12	
2005	Barry Stone	VCD	Kent	Ian Mackenzie	Waverley	Hants	21-9	
2006	John Haines	Desborough Town	Northants	Ian Brewster	Worksop Cricket & SC	Notts	21-13	
2007	John Kelly	Plymouth Civil Service	Devon	John Witcombe	Brierley Park	Notts	21-14	
2008	Graham Skinner	Ottershaw	Surrey	Alan Taylor	G B Britton	Glocs	21-13	
2009	Bill Ward	Leamington Spa	Warks	Ian Wright	Maidenhead Town	Berks	21-9	
2010	Colin Whitehead	Headington	Oxon	Joe Stevens	Epsom	Surrey	21-17	
2011	Mike McDonagh	Cheam	Surrey	Duncan McGovern	Bath	Som	21-10	
2012	Bill Crittle	Wadhurst	Sussex	Bob Wood	Bolton	Lancs	21-15	
2013	Ricky Gallagher	Carlisle Subscription	Cumbria	Mick Evans	Newport Pagnell	Bucks	21-5	
2014	David Snell	Wootton Bassett	Wilts	Jim Marsland	Aldershot Traction	Hants	21-7	
2015	Kevin Phillips	Topsham	Devon	David Drew	St Austell	Cornwall	21-13	
2016	Grant Burgess	Chester Road	Worcs	Stuart Evans	Shaldon	Devon	21-15	
2017	Norman Coad	Carnon Downs	Cornwall	Martin Butchers	Plessey Radar	IOW	21–16	
2018	Gordon Williams	Cornard	Suffolk	Alec Atkinson	Heaton Hall	Lancs	21–6	
2019	Neil Farnish	Gerrards Cross	Bucks	Stuart Evans	Shaldon	Devon	21–16	
2020 No competition due to COVID-19 pandemic								
2021	Grant Burgess	Chester Road	Worcs	Grant Osborne	Sandy Conservative	Beds	21–17	
2022	Jerry Rumball	Garston	Herts	Graham Ashby	Nuneaton	Warks	21–16	
2023	Steve Poyner	Vines Park	Worcs	Graham Ashby	Nuneaton	Warks	21–3	
2024	Ken Weyland	St. Lawrence	Kent	Andrew Squire	Maldon	Essex	21–13	
2025	Kevin Bone	Lyndhurst	Durham	Chris Hanslip	Blossom Way	Lincs	21–18	
2026	Alan George	Spencer Melksham	Wilts	Andrew Bird	Sleaford Town	Lincs	21–20	
