= Bowls England National Championships (men's junior pairs) =

British lawn bowls event

The men's junior pairs is one of the events at the annual English National Bowls Championships.

== Past winners ==
Year	Champions	County	Runners-up	County	Score	Ref
2017	Alex Walton & Jamie Barker	Cambs	Ben Coldrick & Nathan Kitchen	Glos	20–15	
2018	Zach Kidd & Harry Goodwin	Devon	Adam Barker & Jamie Barker	Cambs	17–10	
2019	Alfie Hill & Glen Adams	Middx	Dominic Tuckett & Harry Goodwin	Devon	19–16	
2020 No competition due to COVID-19 pandemic						
2021	Kieron Kniveton & Harry Goodwin	Devon	Adam Pitfield & Nathan Betts	Northants	15–11	
2022	Kieran Kniveton & Scott Eveleigh	Devon	Luke Bell & Dan Cookman	Hants	16–15	
2023	Oli Collins & Liam White	Som	Ryan Brannan & Callum Hodgson	Cumbria	29–7	
2024	Ryan Corkill & Callum Hodgson	Cumbria	Carlos Lali & Ryan Lali	Berks	18–14	
2025	Kieran Jaycock & Thomas Jaycock	Bucks	Joe Sanford & Harry Duffield	Kent	21–20	
2026	Ryan Hard & Joe Sims	Suffolk	Ollie Jeapes & Mack May	Hunts	21–13	
