= Bowls England National Championships (Balcomb Trophy) =

British lawn bowls event

The Balcomb Trophy is one of the events at the annual Bowls England National Championships.

It is an Inter-County Double Rink Competition for men's teams.

== Past winners ==
Year	Champions	Runners-up	Score	Ref
1993	Leicestershire	Lancashire	20-14	
1994	Lincolnshire	Worcestershire	21-15	
1995	Cumbria	Hampshire	18-17	
1996	Buckinghamshire	Essex	18-17	
1997	Nottinghamshire	Cornwall	25-16	
1998	Berkshire	Suffolk	21-16	
1999	Cumbria	Kent	23-20	
2000	Norfolk	Worcestershire	22-19	
2001	Suffolk	Kent	18-15	
2002	Kent	Northumberland	22-13	
2003	Yorkshire	Northamptonshire	23-21	
2004	Kent	Yorkshire	27-20	
2005	Devon	Surrey	20-19	
2006	Berkshire	Devon	39-38	
2007	County Durham	Kent	37-36	
2008	Derbyshire	Cornwall	40-36	
2009	Leicestershire	Cornwall	48-23	
2010	Berkshire	Devon	49-36	
2011	[Lancashire	Cornwall	41-27	
2012	Northumberland	Cornwall	44-42	
2013	Hampshire	Essex	52-34	
2014	Warwickshire	Huntingdonshire	41-38	
2015	Devon	Kent	45–40	
2016	Leicestershire	Northumberland	40–38	
2017	Essex	Devon	43–29	
2018	Lancashire	Cambridgeshire	44–43	
2019	Warwickshire	Essex	40–37	
2020 No competition due to COVID-19 pandemic				
2021	Northamptonshire	Hampshire	40–34	
2022	Essex	Yorkshire	45–27	
2023	Essex	Cumbria	45–36	
2024	Norfolk	Durham	47–23	
2025	Leicestershire	Essex	69–43	
2026	Leicestershire	Huntingdonshire	43–42	
