= Bowls England National Championships (women's top club) =

British lawn bowls event

The women's top club is one of the events at the annual Bowls England National Championships.

== Past winners ==
Year	Champion	County	Runner-up	County	Score	Ref
2008	Oxford City & County	Oxon	Sutton	Surrey		
2009	Kings Torquay	Devon	Wellingborough	Northants		
2010	Portishead RBL	Som	Oxford City & County	Oxon		
2011	Saffron Ladies	Sussex	Forest Oaks	Notts		
2012	Wigton	Cumbria	Croydon	Surrey		
2013	Oxford City & County	Oxon	Egham	Surrey		
2014	Egham	Surrey	Saffron Ladies	Suffolk		
2015	Egham	Surrey	Banbury Central	Oxon		
2016	Wigton	Cumbria	Kings	Devon		
2017	Wigton	Cumbria	Parkway	Hunts		
2018	Kings Torquay	Devon	Sutton	Surrey		
2019	Kings Torquay	Devon	Baldock	Herts		
2020 No competition due to COVID-19 pandemic						
2021	Kings Torquay	Devon	Appleyard	Kent	3–1	
2022	Kings Torquay	Devon	Gerrards Cross	Bucks	3–1	
2023	Kings Torquay	Devon	Egham	Surrey	2–2 (63–53)	
2024	Appleyard	Kent	Southey	Surrey	2–2 (65–62)	
2025	Royal Leamington Spa	Warks	Kings	Devon	3–1	
2026	Royal Leamington Spa	Warks	Cleethorpes	Lincs	4–0	
