= Bowls England National Championships (Walker Cup) =

The Walker Cup is one of the events at the annual Bowls England National Championships.

It is an Inter-County Double Rink Competition for women's teams.

== Past winners ==
| Year | Champion | Runner-up | Score | Ref |
|---|---|---|---|---|
| 1958 | Warwickshire | Buckinghamshire | | |
| 1959 | Durham | Devon | | |
| 1960 | Devon | Leicestershire | | |
| 1961 | Gloucestershire | Northumberland | | |
| 1962 | Surrey | Suffolk | | |
| 1963 | Yorkshire | Devon | | |
| 1964 | Nottinghamshire | Hampshire | | |
| 1965 | Suffolk | Somerset | | |
| 1966 | Suffolk | Middlesex | | |
| 1967 | Middlesex | Suffolk | | |
| 1968 | Hertfordshire | Northumberland | | |
| 1969 | Devon | Bedfordshire | | |
| 1970 | Somerset | Yorkshire | | |
| 1971 | Middlesex | Northumberland | | |
| 1972 | Devon | Nottinghamshire | | |
| 1973 | Hampshire | Lincolnshire | | |
| 1974 | Surrey | Durham | | |
| 1975 | Warwickshire | Gloucestershire | | |
| 1976 | Lincolnshire | Devon | | |
| 1977 | Somerset | Devon | | |
| 1978 | Essex | Norfolk | | |
| 1979 | Warwickshire | Middlesex | | |
| 1980 | Middlesex | Cambridgeshire | | |
| 1981 | Middlesex | Durham | | |
| 1982 | Devon | Lincolnshire | | |
| 1983 | Oxfordshire | Gloucestershire | | |
| 1984 | Middlesex | Huntingdonshire | | |
| 1985 | Surrey | Northamptonshire | | |
| 1986 | Oxfordshire | Hampshire | | |
| 1987 | Nottinghamshire | Middlesex | | |
| 1988 | Oxfordshire | Hertfordshire | | |
| 1989 | Cornwall | Durham | | |
| 1990 | Oxfordshire | Devon | | |
| 1991 | Norfolk | Hampshire | | |
| 1992 | Suffolk | Somerset | | |
| 1993 | Cornwall | Lincolnshire | | |
| 1994 | Surrey | Cornwall | | |
| 1995 | Oxfordshire | Somerset | | |
| 1996 | Somerset | Kent | | |
| 1997 | Yorkshire | Dorset | | |
| 1998 | Surrey | Huntingdonshire | | |
| 1999 | Hertfordshire | Bedfordshire | | |
| 2000 | Lincolnshire | Kent | | |
| 2001 | Huntingdonshire | Cornwall | | |
| 2002 | Durham | Huntingdonshire | | |
| 2003 | Cumbria | Kent | 46–24 | |
| 2004 | Cambridgeshire | Somerset | | |
| 2005 | Huntingdonshire | Gloucestershire | | |
| 2006 | Devon | Kent | | |
| 2007 | Hertfordshire | Bedfordshire | | |
| 2008 | Somerset | Berkshire | | |
| 2009 | Durham | Warwickshire | | |
| 2010 | Devon | Essex | | |
| 2011 | Surrey | Lincolnshire | | |
| 2012 | Huntingdonshire | Cumbria | | |
| 2013 | Durham | Oxfordshire | | |
| 2014 | Surrey | Nottinghamshire | | |
| 2015 | Devon | Lincolnshire | | |
| 2016 | Leicestershire | Devon | | |
| 2017 | Somerset | Kent | | |
| 2018 | Sussex | Yorkshire | | |
| 2019 | Lincolnshire | Northamptonshire | | |
| 2020 No competition due to COVID-19 pandemic | | | | |
| 2021 | Lincolnshire | Kent | 47–29 | |
| 2022 | Kent | Wiltshire | 40–29 | |
| 2023 | Lincolnshire | Norfolk | 32–27 | |
| 2024 | Surrey | Northamptonshire | 40–32 | |
| 2025 | Devon | Oxfordshire | 71–66 | |
| 2026 | Devon | Hampshire | 48–38 | |
