= Bowls England National Championships (mixed pairs) =

British lawn bowls event

The mixed pairs is one of the events at the annual Bowls England National Championships.

The event was inaugurated in Brighton during 1985.

== Venues ==
- 1985–1985 (Brighton)
- 1986–1986 (Bedford)
- 1988–1988 (Maidenhead)
- 2014–present (Victoria Park, Royal Leamington Spa)

== Sponsors ==
- 1986–1988 (McCarthy Stone)
- 2023–2025 (Aviva)

== Past winners ==
Year	Champions	County	Runners-up	County	Score	Ref
1985	John Kilyon & Jean Kilyon	Leics	Mary Player & Ian Spreadborough	Devon	19–18	
1986	June Measures & John McConnell	Beds	Mike Trimble & Patsy Trimble	Wilts	24–19	
1987	Pat James & Terry James	Northants	Wendy Line & Peter Line	Hants	26–25	
1988	Myra Smith & David Wakefield	Essex	Mary Duffy & Trevor West	Surrey	27–12	
1989	Ray Gaskins & Carol Gaskins	Oxon	Wendy Line & Peter Line	Hants	22–15	
1990	Wendy Line & Peter Line	Hants	Pat Bradley & Tony Allcock	Glocs	23–16	
1991	Mr & Mrs Gary Smith	Beds	Mr & Mrs P. Day	Devon	22–16	
1992	Mr & Mrs Alan Jones	Warks	Mr & Mrs R. Riley	Kent	22–21	
1993	Yvonne Lyons & John Crosby	Herts	Mrs B. Carey & B. Kilby	Glocs	26–10	
1994	Mr & Mrs C. Bailey	Hants	Mr & Mrs Roy Rodgers	Bucks	21–13	
1995	Mrs J. Bailey & Phil Dickens	Notts	Jayne Roylance & Chris Ward	Norfolk	21–13	
1996	Allyson Flint & James Marsland	Hants	Enid Adams & Graham Roe	Notts	19–18	
1997	Sue Bard-Bodek & Ken Allen	Middx	Carol McGrail & Timothy Orr	Surrey	29–12	
1998	Barbara Prew & Alan Prew	Glocs/Oxon	Lynne Whitehead & Ian Wones	Norfolk	18–17	
1999	Viv Sayward & Alec Atkinson	Lancs	Mrs J. Turner & Duncan Robinson	Notts	22–10	
2000	Mr & Mrs John Searle	Dorset	Mr & Mrs Ray Gaskins	Oxon/Bucks	22–21	
2001	Sue Harriott & William Davis	Devon	Janet Walby & Steve Marrett	Middx	23–16	
2002	June Hartley & Mark Walton	Yorks	Irene Barber & Gerry Smyth	Bucks/Middx	25–18	
2003	Mr & Mrs Roy Rodgers	Bucks	Noreen Fleet & David Gregory	Cumbria	24–22	
2004e	Tina Burgess & Paul Broderick	Northants	Kitty Mullholland & Calvin Mullholland	Dorset	31–21	
2005	Rebecca Smith & Allan Seth	Essex	Gail Hunter & Richard Bolton	Essex	21–16	
2006	Elaine & Andrew Irons	Leics	Marilyn Gozna & Terry Barnes	Som	19–18	
2007	Tina Burgess & Paul Broderick	Northants	Sue Westoby & Mark Walton	Yorks	17–16	
2008	Sally Butcher & Mark Royal	Suffolk	Jean Arnaud & Peter Ward	Hants	20–9	
2009	Natalie Melmore & Griff Sanders	Devon	Sarah Jenkinson & David Baird	Notts	24–8	
2010	Debbie Shadwell & Graham Shadwell	Wilts	Sue Willmott & David Richardson	Sussex	26–14	
2011	Alan Dent & Amy Gowshall	Lins	Debbie Shadwell & Graham Shadwell	Wilts	19–5	
2012	Debbie Shadwell & Graham Shadwell	Wilts	Catherine Popple & Stuart Popple	Hunts	21–15	
2013	Annalisa Bellamy & Scott Dunham	Lincs	Emily Ferguson & Perry Martin	Kent	23–9	
2014	Katie Smith & Jamie Walker	Leics/Northants	Marilyn Gozna & Ian Chapman	Northants	22–13	
2015	Barbara Bellamy & Sam Tolchard	Devon	Julie Hudson & Chris Daniels	Hants	26–11	
2016	Amy Stanton & Andy Walters	Worcs	Sylvia Bloomfield & Tim Mould	Essex	22–12	
2017	Amy Walters & Andy Walters	Worcs	Elaine Score & Ed Morris	Essex	20–19	
2018	Denise Butchers & Martin Butchers	IOW	Sally Butcher & Mark Royal / Martin Heitzmann (sub)	Sussex	26–20	
2019	Lucy Smith & Mike Titcombe	Wilts	Sara Trotter & Dave Mason	Sussex	24–8	
2020 No competition due to COVID-19 pandemic						
2021	Elaine Score & Ed Morris	Essex	Sue Allen & Mark Walton	Yorks	23–5	
2022	Sylvia Bloomfield & Paul Smyth	Essex	Jean Collier & Russell Francis	Wilts	13–11	
2023	Wayne Willgress & Rebecca Willgress	Norfolk	Grant Burgess & Maddie Burgess	Worcs	18–13	
2024	Alan Dent Jnr & Amy Pharaoh	Lincs	Rhianna Russell & Glenn Williams	Herts	23–7	
2025	Curtis Johnson & Billie Swift	Northants	Alan Dent Jnr & Amy Pharaoh	Lincs	18–15	
2026	Edward Morris & Elaine Score	Essex	Kate Capon & Richard Cushen	Surrey	20–4	
