= Bowls England National Championships (men's senior fours) =

British lawn bowls event

The men's senior fours is one of the events at the annual Bowls England National Championships. The event was inaugurated in 2017.

== Past winners ==
Year	Champions	Club	County	Runners-up	Club	County	Score	Ref
2017	Barry Sictorness, Terry Walton; Chris Cheesley, Mel Biggs	Royal Wootton Bassett	Wilts	George Williams, Cyril Pearson; Michael Creegan & Michael English	Dipton Park	Durham	19–16	
2018	Kevin Embling, Graham Richards; Alan Small, Dave Snell	Royal Wootton Bassett	Wilts	Ron Mayne, Ross Newman; Reg Burton, David Simpson	New Lount	Leics	24–13	
2019	Peter Warne, Michael Blizzard; Bob Harris, Trevor Broad	Thatcham	Berks	Paul Kitchen, Richard Payne; Wayne White, Grant Burgess	Chester Road	Worcs	19–12	
2020 No competition due to COVID-19 pandemic								
2021	Brett Arkley, Tony Humphries; Alex Bryden, Alan Theobald	Dunston	Durham	Howard Else, Paul Williamson; Leonard Hale, Irvine Powdrill	East Leake	Notts	16–11	
2022	Vaughan Holland, Paul Bunting; Craig Shaw, Alan Symondson	Reading	Berks	Gary Toward, Graham Chappell; Keith Smith, Joe Breward	Blaby	Leics	13–12	
2023	Gary Clark, Martin Sampson; Simon Greenwood, David McCallum	Camberley	Surrey	Mike Stray, Roy Elkington; David Brammer, Kevin Lewis	Branston	Lincs	33–5	
2024	David Lee, Laurence Kelly; Tom Prescott, John Baird	Carlisle Subscription	Cumbria	David Simpson, John Godman; Kirk Smith, Alan Price	Gerrards Cross	Bucks	18–11	
2025	Phil Sturman, Dave Wilde, Neil Clarke, Mark Sandoz	Gilt Edge	Worcs	Martin Dawkins, Mark Wilkinson, John Winter, Duncan Shearer	Houghton Regis	Beds	17–9	
2026	Phil Birch, Keith Wooding, Mark Ireland, Graham Ashby	Avenue (Coventry)	Warks	Albert Ward, Gary Dougherty, Ian Jackson, John Mansfield	Blackhall	Durham	13–12	
