= Bowls England National Championships (women's senior pairs) =

British lawn bowls event

The women's senior pairs is one of the events at the annual Bowls England National Championships.

The event is an age restricted women's event for over 60s (55 from 1988-2025).

== Venues ==
- 2021–present (Victoria Park, Royal Leamington Spa)

== Sponsors ==
- 2026–2026 (Pegasus Homes)

== Past winners ==
Year	Champion	County	Runner-up	County	Ref
1974	W Thatcher & J Lucking	Berks			
1975	E Hollick & W Griffiths	Devon			
1976	Ruth Towle & Anne Cockayne	Notts			
1977	Peggy King & Elsie Batchelor	Middx			
1978	R Murray & N Horner	Northumb			
1979	B Robertson & I Smallbone	Worcs			
1980	Olive Bennett & Betty Neillis	Som			
1981	M Hewlett & M Howard	Surrey			
1982	Jean Holden & Betty Warters	Hunts	Gladys Cuthbert & Elsie French	Cambs	
1983	T Drayton & P Soulsby	Surrey	Christine Featherstone & Kathleen Warne	Devon	
1984	Mabel Simons & Claire Reynolds	Notts	Margaret Harrison & Kath Saill	Glocs	
1985	J Ward & another	Norfolk			
1986	L Maynard & G Berry	Herts	B Bratton & A Marshall	Wilts	
1987	Eileen Smith & Joan Steven	Sussex	Elfreda Saunders & Doreen Fletcher	Hants	
1988	Barbara Carey & Peggy Edwards	Glocs	Pauline Bray & Audrey Wright	Northants	
1989	Audrey Galasinski & Philippa Green	Leics	Lilian Wright & Joan Daniels	Cambs	
1990	Peggy Edwards & Barbara Carey	Glocs	Irene Molyneux & Margaret Ellis	Oxon	
1991	M Harrison & D Brown	Dorset	S Drage & J Pittam	Northants	
1992	L Gadd & L Ward	Sussex	H Morley & J Foster	Yorks	
1993	Joyce Morgan & June Larter	Cambs	E Brough & E Massey	Devon	
1994	Joyce Chelin & Brenda Keller	Yorks	Lilian Gibbs & Patsy Walker	Middx	
1995	Pat Oliver & Peggy Roache	Glocs	Rosemary Ludar-Smith	Essex	
1996	Wendy Anderson & Doris Woodley	Wilts	Win Sowerby & Audrey Reeves	Cumbria	
1997	Irene Barber & Pat Launders	Middx	Marian Williams & Molly Rackham	Lincs	
1998	Jean Rees & Mary Collard	Som	Jacqui Cook & Margaret Grosvenor	Warwicks	
1999					
2000	Cindy Edmundson & Noreen Fleet	Cumbria	Joyce Chelin & Anita Haw	Yorks	
2001	Nova Edwards & Jill Price	Bucks	Pat Terry & Joyce Harman	Sussex	
2002	Ruth Bond & Christine Theedom	Devon	Jacqui Cook & Margaret Grosvenor	Warwicks	
2003	Jenny Moore & Wendy Barnard	Devon	Doreen Hodson Smith & Sue Larkins	Herts	
2004	Jenny Whitlock & Edna Bessell	Som	Maureen Christmas & Rene Bretherton	Cambs	
2005	Una Prideaux & Crystal Eathorne	Cornwall	Gill Blackmore & Carolyne Morgan	Oxon	
2006	Jayne Roylance & Margaret Hannant	Norfolk	Brenda Lines & Pam Hughes	Middx	
2007	Janet Cropper & Evelyn Franklin	Lancs	Lilian Fletcher & Brenda Atherton	Notts	
2008	Brenda Thomas & Sue Springell	Bucks	Hazel Bass & Anne Hadley	Hunts	
2009	Margaret McColl & Pam Margrett	Glocs	Mary Taylor & Kay Kerley	Hants	
2010	Gwen Xuereb & Geraldine Reeve	Norfolk	Teresa Pearson & Gill Jones	Durham	
2011	Teresa Pearson & Gill Jones	Durham	Lydia Munn & Carol Morton	Kent	
2012	Judith Staunton & Joan Walmsley	Somerset	Joyce Jones & Janet Cropper	Lancs	
2013	Ingar Newman & Norma Beales	Surrey	Karen Tandler & Marian Wheatley	Herefords	
2014	Yvonne Woodcock & Wendy Davies	Sussex	Carole Robertson & Pamela Armstrong	Bucks	
2015	Pat Logan & Marjorie Crowe	Worcestershire	Judy Bacon & Beverley Wall	Berks	
2016	Carol Inserra & Lynn Green	Leicestershire	Linda Challenger & Lindsay Collin	Glocs	
2017	Lesley Johnson & Margaret Holden	Hampshire	Rita Gerry & Julia Stannard	Glocs	
2018	Glynis Morgan & Joan Rodgerson	Durham	Lesley Johnson & Margaret Holden	Hants	
2019	Lorraine Hume & Rachel Mackriell	Sussex	Pat Clarke & Christine Webb	Norfolk	
No competition due to COVID-19 pandemic					
2021	Moira Self & Julie Spice	Suffolk	Kirsty Cox & Caroline Cullum	Lincolnshire	
2022	Lynn Williams & Elaine Amery	Somerset	Patricia Browne & Sheila Storey	Northumberland	
2023	Linda Churchman & Cheryl Salisbury	Cambs	Margaret Smith & Teresa Orriss	Surrey	
2024	Val Molton & Lindsay Collin	Glocs	Caroline Campion & Carole Galletly	Oxon	
2025	Val Davis & Liz Lock	Devon	Christine Mitchell & Alison Fail	Wilts	
2026	Helen Jones & Doreen De Silva	Sussex	Anne Green & Denise Newport	Bucks	
