= Matthew Marchant =

English male lawn and indoor bowler

Personal information
- Nationality: England
- Born: 1981 (age 44–45)

Sport
- Sport: Lawn / indoor bowls
- Club: Southsea Waverley

Matthew Marchant (born 1981) is an English male lawn and indoor bowler.

He is an England international and was the National Men's Champion of Champions Singles Champion in 2014 during the Men's National Championships.

He bowls outdoors for Southsea Waverley.
