= Bowls England National Championships (club two fours) =

British lawn bowls event

The club two fours is one of the events at the annual Bowls England National Championships.

== Past winners ==
Year	County	Champions	County	Runners-up	Score	Ref
1973	Northumberland	Angus	Kent	Sandwich	Unknown	
1974	Worcestershire	Brotherhood	Gloucestershire	Winget	Unknown	
1975	Yorkshire	Guisborough K.G.V.	Warwickshire	Stoke (Coventry)	Unknown	
1976	Wiltshire	Malmesbury	Leicestershire	Belgrave	44-34	
1977	Devon	Exonia	County Durham	Roker Marine	Unknown	
1978	Devon	Plymouth Hoe	Warwickshire	Stoke (Coventry)	Unknown	
1979	County Durham	Eldon Grove	Warwickshire	Stoke (Coventry)	Unknown	
1980	Buckinghamshire	Chesham	Kent	Bexleyheath Cons.	48-39	
1981	Hampshire	Banister Park	Somerset	Bristol	Unknown	
1982	Somerset	Burnham On Sea	Somerset	Bristol	Unknown	
1983	Warwickshire	G.E.C. Willans	Suffolk	Marlborough	Unknown	
1984	County Durham	View Lane Park	Somerset	Knowle	47-36	
1985	Norfolk	Wymondham Dell	Devon	Plymouth Sir Francis Drake	43-30	
1986	Suffolk	Marlborough	Berkshire	Windsor & Eton	39-34	
1987	Warwickshire	Stoke (Coventry)	Devon	Plymouth North Down	36-32	
1988	County Durham	View Lane Park	Hampshire	Southsea Waverley	50-23	
1989	Nottinghamshire	G.P.T.	Suffolk	Marlborough	45-35	
1990	Lancashire	Bolton	Kent	Blackheath & Greenwich	38-36	
1991	Essex	Liberty of Havering	Huntingdonshire	Belvedere	40-22	
1992	Nottinghamshire	Church Warsop	Warwickshire	Erdington Court	35-34	
1993	Kent	Blackheath & Greenwich	Hampshire	Bournemouth	44-36	
1994	Somerset	Bath	Lancashire	Bolton	51-26	
1995	Somerset	Bristol	Lancashire	Bolton	41-40	
1996	Worcestershire	Bank House Hotel	Essex	Pegasus	42-24	
1997	Northamptonshire	Desborough Town	Essex	Liberty of Havering	32-31	
1998	Suffolk	Marlborough	Cumbria	Wigton	47-29	
1999	Buckinghamshire	Gerrards Cross	Kent	Blackheath & Greenwich	33-30	
2000	Northamptonshire	Desborough Town	Essex	Liberty of Havering	47-39	
2001	Oxfordshire	Banbury Borough	Buckinghamshire	Marlow	46-30	
2002	Lincolnshire	Cleethorpes	Somerset	Bristol	41-33	
2003	Oxfordshire	Banbury Borough	Northamptonshire	Kingsthorpe	43-34	
2004	Kent	Sandwich	Leicestershire	Shepshed Town	42-23	
2005	Cornwall	Carnon Downs	Cumbria	Wigton	36-33	
2006	Nottinghamshire	Cavaliers	Cornwall	Carnon Downs	39-37	
2007	Cornwall	St Austell	Surrey	Croydon	39-31	
2008	Huntingdonshire	White Hart Warboys	Surrey	Egham	40-22	
2009	Devon	Shaldon	Northumberland	Gosforth	37-30	
2010	Cornwall	St Austell	Essex	Essex County	40-34	
2011	County Durham	Darlington Railway Athletic	Devon	Shaldon	39-38	
2012	Hertfordshire	Garston	Somerset	Ilminster	37-33	
2013	Worcestershire	Worcester	Suffolk	Felixstowe & Suffolk	48-32	
2014	Kent	Sandwich	Essex	Essex County	43–27	
2015	Cambridgeshire	Newmarket Avenue	County Durha	Darlington Railway Athletic	38–23	
2016	Devon	Kings	Surrey	Weybridge	39–38	
2017	Devon	Kings	Middlesex	Poplar	39–31	
2018	Buckinghamshire	Gerrards Cross	Hertfordshire	Buntingford	44–20	
2019	Wiltshire	Royal Wootton Bassett	Devon	Kings	40–39	
2020 No competition due to COVID-19 pandemic						
2021	Berkshire	Reading	Lincolnshire	Burton House	28–22	
2022	Durham	Silksworth	Huntingdonshire	Brampton	32–31	
2023	Isle of Wight	Shanklin	Leicestershire	New Lount	34–31	
2024	Bucks	Gerrards Cross	Hunts	Brampton	30–27	
2025	Berks	Shrivenham	Lincs	Royal Mail Cart	33–32	
2026	Northumb	Gosford	Worcs	Worcester	39–28	
