= Danny Denison =

English lawn and indoor bowler

Personal information
- Nationality: British (English)
- Born: Q1, 1962 Newton Abbot, Devon

Sport
- Sport: Lawn & indoor bowls
- Club: Torquay United

Daniel Denison (born 1962) is a former English international lawn and Indoor bowler.

== Bowls career ==
He won the Men's National Fours Championship in 1994 at the National Championships.

He has also won the Men's Champion of Champions Singles Champions on four occasions in 1985, 1986, 1999 and 2000 and the national triples in 1994.

== Personal life ==
His bowling career was interrupted twice following a jail sentence in 2007 for fraud and perjury and a 12-month ban in 2015.

In April 2022, he received a 43-month custodial sentence after pleading guilty to running a fraudulent business. He had defrauded 18 customers out of £135,000.
