= Bowls England National Championships (Middleton Cup) =

British lawn bowls event

The Middleton Cup is one of the events at the annual Bowls England National Championships.

It is an Inter-County Championship for six rinks of men's teams.

== Past winners ==
| Year | Champions | Runners-up | Score | Ref |
|---|---|---|---|---|
| 1911 | Middlesex | Surrey | 88–85 | |
| 1912 | Kent | Devon | | |
| 1913 | Middlesex | Sussex | 82–56 | |
| 1914 | Surrey | Essex | | |
1915–1918 No competition due to war
| 1919 | Bedfordshire | Devon | | |
| 1920 | Surrey | Essex | | |
| 1921 | Surrey | Devon | | |
| 1922 | Bedfordshire | Berkshire | | |
| 1923 | Surrey | Kent | | |
| 1924 | Surrey | Middlesex | | |
| 1925 | Middlesex | Kent | 119–102 | |
| 1926 | Northumberland | Essex | | |
| 1927 | Surrey | Cumberland and Westmorland | | |
| 1928 | Surrey | Devon | | |
| 1929 | Kent | Northumberland | | |
| 1930 | Northumberland | Essex | | |
| 1931 | Surrey | Isle of Wight | | |
| 1932 | Northamptonshire | Surrey | | |
| 1933 | Surrey | Hampshire | | |
| 1934 | Northamptonshire | Hampshire | | |
| 1935 | Hampshire | Northamptonshire | 121–100 | |
| 1936 | Gloucestershire | Surrey | | |
| 1937 | Surrey | Hampshire | | |
| 1938 | Dorset | County Durham | | |
| 1939 | Surrey | Northumberland | | |
1940–1944 No competition due to war
| 1945 | Northumberland | Hampshire | | |
| 1946 | Yorkshire | Sussex | | |
| 1947 | Yorkshire | Devon | | |
| 1948 | Devon | Gloucestershire | | |
| 1949 | Devon | Surrey | | |
| 1950 | Devon | Surrey | | |
| 1951 | Northumberland | Middlesex | | |
| 1952 | Middlesex | Surrey | 121–109 | |
| 1953 | Yorkshire | Surrey | | |
| 1954 | Middlesex | Nottinghamshire | 147–82 | |
| 1955 | Surrey | Somerset | | |
| 1956 | Sussex | Yorkshire | | |
| 1957 | Surrey | Northamptonshire | | |
| 1958 | Surrey | Buckinghamshire | | |
| 1959 | Devon | Northumberland | | |
| 1960 | Surrey | Hampshire | | |
| 1961 | Nottinghamshire | Somerset | | |
| 1962 | Middlesex | Hampshire | 120–118 | |
| 1963 | Hampshire | Essex | 125–114 | |
| 1964 | Leicestershire | Warwickshire | | |
| 1965 | Middlesex | Northamptonshire | 134–89 | |
| 1966 | Norfolk | Hampshire | | |
| 1967 | Hampshire | Middlesex | 117–90 | |
| 1968 | Hampshire | Suffolk | 131–103 | |
| 1969 | Middlesex | Hertfordshire | | |
| 1970 | Warwickshire | Middlesex | 124–115 | |
| 1971 | Hampshire | Middlesex | 110–104 | |
| 1972 | Surrey | County Durham | | |
| 1973 | Yorkshire | Middlesex | | |
| 1974 | Kent | Lincolnshire | | |
| 1975 | Surrey | Hampshire | | |
| 1976 | Lincolnshire | Surrey | | |
| 1977 | Somerset | Middlesex | | |
| 1978 | Yorkshire | Nottinghamshire | | |
| 1979 | Somerset | Hampshire | | |
| 1980 | Northamptonshire | Somerset | 125–112 | |
| 1981 | Somerset | Norfolk | | |
| 1982 | Berkshire | Nottinghamshire | | |
| 1983 | Surrey | Somerset | 109–108 | |
| 1984 | Somerset | Northumberland | 127–103 | |
| 1985 | Northumberland | Lincolnshire | 117–108 | |
| 1986 | Wiltshire | Leicestershire | 129–114 | |
| 1987 | Kent | Essex | 142–89 | |
| 1988 | Northumberland | Lincolnshire | 126–117 | |
| 1989 | Kent | Lancashire | 117–107 | |
| 1990 | Yorkshire | Dorset | 136–113 | |
| 1991 | Kent | Devon | 123–107 | |
| 1992 | Norfolk | Cornwall | 120–112 | |
| 1993 | Kent | Cumbria | 145–73 | |
| 1994 | Cumbria | Middlesex | 102–98 | |
| 1995 | Cumbria | Suffolk | 119–107 | |
| 1996 | Lincolnshire | Worcestershire | 112–102 | |
| 1997 | Norfolk | Lancashire | 113–109 | |
| 1998 | Lancashire | Warwickshire | 117–109 | |
| 1999 | Cumbria | Kent | 125–114 | |
| 2000 | County Durham | Norfolk | 123–117 | |
| 2001 | Cumbria | Kent | 112–109 | |
| 2002 | Devon | Essex | 122–113 | |
| 2003 | Devon | Lincolnshire | 128–122 | |
| 2004 | Devon | Surrey | 116–110 | |
| 2005 | Cumbria | Oxfordshire | 126–115 | |
| 2006 | Norfolk | Cumbria | 108–105 | |
| 2007 | Devon | Huntingdonshire | 125–112 | |
| 2008 | Devon | Norfolk | 120–109 | |
| 2009 | Cornwall | Yorkshire | 128–103 | |
| 2010 | Cornwall | Huntingdonshire | 126–109 | |
| 2011 | Devon | Berkshire | 117–106 | |
| 2012 | Norfolk | Wiltshire | 118–114 | |
| 2013 | Berkshire | Devon | 115–105 | |
| 2014 | Hampshire | Norfolk | 126–106 | |
| 2015 | Devon | Cumbria | 125–113 | |
| 2016 | Devon | Kent | 115–104 | |
| 2017 | Devon | Kent | 127–95 | |
| 2018 | Leicestershire | Devon | 119–119 (9–1 extra ends) | |
| 2019 | Devon | Kent | 120–79 | |
| 2020 No competition due to COVID-19 pandemic | | | | |
| 2021 | Kent | Northamptonshire | 121–111 | |
| 2022 | Berkshire | Hertfordshire | 133–95 | |
| 2023 | Lincolnshire | Berkshire | 115–98 | |
| 2024 | Wiltshire | Northumberland | 106–91 | |
| 2025 | Devon | Lincolnshire | 125–111 | |
| 2026 | Lincolnshire | Buckinghamshire | 104–84 | |
