= Bowls England National Championships (top club) =

British lawn bowls event

The top club is one of the men's team events at the annual Bowls England National Championships. Kings BC, arguably the leading team in England have won the event four years running and the team includes Louis Ridout, Jamie Chestney and Sam Tolchard.

== Past winners ==
Year	Champions	County	Runner-up	County	Score	Ref
2003	Felixstowe & Suffolk	Suffolk	Westlecot	Wilts	3–2	
2004	North Walsham (EBA)	Norfolk	Gerrards Cross	Bucks	3–2	
2005	Gerrards Cross	Bucks	Gosforth	Northumb	3–2	
2006	Felixstowe & Suffolk	Suffolk	Worcester	Worcs	4–1	
2007	Banbury Borough	Oxon	Westlecot	Wiltshire	3–2	
2008	Aldershot Traction Athletic	Hants	Romford	Essex	3–2	
2009	Boscombe Cliff	Hants	Bristol	Som	5–0	
2010	Rugby	Warks	Shaldon	Devon	3–2	
2011	Worcester	Worcs	Rugby	Warks	3–2	
2012	Worcester	Worcs	Shaldon	Devon	3–2	
2013	Cavaliers	Notts	Stenalees	Cornwall	3.5–1.5	
2014	St Austell	Cornwall	Kingsthorpe	Northants	3–2	
2015	Gosforth	Northumb	Garston	Herts	3–2	
2016	Kings Torquay	Devon	Royal Wootton Bassett	Wilts	4–1	
2017	Kings Torquay	Devon	Reading	Berks	5–0	
2018	Kings Torquay	Devon	Norfolk BC	Norfolk	3–2	
2019	Kings Torquay	Devon	Gerrards Cross	Bucks	4–1	
2020 No competition due to COVID-19 pandemic						
2021	Bromley	Kent	Culm Vale	Devon	3–2	
2022	Cheltenham	Glocs	Culm Vale	Devon	3–2	
2023	Appleyard	Kent	Shanklin	IOW	3–2	
2024	Gerrards Cross	Bucks	Reading	Berks	3.5–1.5	
2025	Gerrards Cross	Bucks	Avenue, Coventry	Warks	3–2	
2026	Parkway	Hunts	Cheltenham	Glocs	3–2	
