= Bowls England National Championships (White Rose Trophy) =

British lawn bowls event

The White Rose Trophy is one of the events at the annual Bowls England National Championships. It is an Inter-County Double Rink Competition for male players aged 25 or under.

== Past winners ==
Year	Champions	Runners-up	Score	ref
1993	Essex	Cornwall	37–36	
1994	Cumbria	Northamptonshire	37–36	
1995	Essex	Nottinghamshire	39–38	
1996	Cornwall	Cumbria	46–33	
1997	Northamptonshire	Lincolnshire	34–32	
1998	Leicestershire	Worcestershire	39–35	
1999	Sussex	Northamptonshire	40–35	
2000	Northumberland	Cornwall	40–34	
2001	Norfolk	Lincolnshire	54–24	
2002	Devon	Cumbria	41–39	
2003	Cumbria	Middlesex	49–39	
2004	Surrey	Devon	52–42	
2005	Cumbria	Leicestershire	48–38	
2006	Devon	Leicestershire	42–34	
2007	Cumbria	Somerset	45–29	
2008	Essex	Derbyshire	40–36	
2009	Devon	Leicestershire	45–25	
2010	Devon	Isle of Wight	54–31	
2011	Huntingdonshire	Essex	38–37	
2012	Devon	Norfolk	40–35	
2013	Huntingdonshire	Surrey	49–28	
2014	Surrey	Worcestershire	48–45	
2015	Devon	Northamptonshire	41–31	
2016	Essex	Oxfordshire	43–22	
2017	Devon	Berkshire	41–37	
2018	Northamptonshire	Kent	48–28	
2019	Surrey	Northamptonshire	18–9	
2020 No competition due to COVID-19 pandemic				
2021	Buckinghamshire	Northamptonshire	42–30	
2022	Kent	Warwickshire	40–26	
2023	Kent	Cambridgeshire	46–41	
2024	Warwickshire	Hampshire	36–28	
2025	Huntingdonshire	Gloucestershire	46–34	
2026	Warwickshire	Cornwall	23–16	
