= Lorraine Kuhler =

English bowls player

Personal information
- Nationality: British (English)
- Born: 7 June 1990 (age 36) Brighton, England

Sport
- Sport: Lawn bowls
- Club: Headington Bowls Club (outdoors); Adur IBC (indoors)
Medal record
Representing England
World Outdoor Championships
Gold medal – first place	2023 Gold Coast	fours
Silver medal – second place	2023 Gold Coast	team
Atlantic Bowls Championships
Gold medal – first place	2019 Cardiff	triples
European Championships
Silver medal – second place	2011 Portugal	pairs
Silver medal – second place	2011 Portugal	team
Silver medal – second place	2022 Ayr	triples
Bronze medal – third place	2022 Ayr	fours

Lorraine Kuhler (born 7 June 1990) is an English international lawn and indoor bowler.

== Bowls career ==
Kuhler took up bowls at the age of 11 at her parents' club in Brighton. Kuhler is a National triples champion (2014) and three times winner of the National Junior Pairs at the Bowls England National Championships when bowling for Worthing Pavilion and Sussex. In 2011, she won two medals at the European Bowls Championships in Portugal.

In 2019, she won the gold medal at the Atlantic Bowls Championships and in 2020, she was selected for the 2020 World Outdoor Bowls Championship in Australia but the event was cancelled due to the COVID-19 pandemic. In 2022, she won triples silver and fours bronze at the European Bowls Championships.

In 2023, she was selected as part of the team to represent England at the 2023 World Outdoor Bowls Championship. She participated in the women's triples and the women's fours events. In the fours, her team won the gold medal defeating Australia in the final.

In 2024, Kuhler won the national pairs bowling with her close friend Katherine Hawes-Watts for the Oxford City & County BC at the 2024 Bowls England National Finals.
