= Katherine Hawes =

English female lawn and indoor bowler

Personal information
- Nationality: British (English)
- Born: 9 December 1969 (age 56)

Sport
- Sport: Lawn / indoor bowls
- Club: Headington Bowls Club
Medal record
Women's lawn bowls
Representing England
World Outdoor Championships
Silver medal – second place	2000 Moama	Women's Triples
Gold medal – first place	2000 Moama	Women's Team
Atlantic Bowls Championships
Gold medal – first place	1997 Llandrindod Wells	pairs
Silver medal – second place	1999 Cape Town	fours
English Nationals
Gold medal – first place	1992	triples
Gold medal – first place	1997	singles2w
Gold medal – first place	2010	CofC
Gold medal – first place	2014	fours
Gold medal – first place	2015, 2024	pairs

Katherine Elizabeth Alice Hawes-Watts (born 1969) is an English lawn and indoor bowler international.

== Bowls career ==
=== International events ===
In 1997 she won the pairs gold medal at the Atlantic Bowls Championships with Mary Price.

The following year she represented England at the 1998 Commonwealth Games in the pairs again with Mary Price, at the 1998 Commonwealth Games in Kuala Lumpur, Malaysia.

In 1999 she won a fours silver at the Atlantic Championships in Cape Town and the following year she won a triples silver medal at the 2000 World Outdoor Bowls Championship in Moama, Australia.

=== National events ===
Hawes won national titles in 1992 (National triples), 1997 (1997 National Two Wood singles) 2010 (2010 National Champion of Champions), 2014 (National fours) and 2015 (National pairs).

At the 2021 Bowls England National Finals, she just missed out on winning a sixth title after finishing runner-up to Stef Branfield in the two wood singles, losing 16–10.

In 2024, Hawes-Watts won the national pairs again, bowling with her close friend Lorraine Kuhler for the Oxford City & County BC at the 2024 Bowls England National Finals.
