= Bowls England =

Governing body of bowls in England

- Sport: Bowls
- Jurisdiction: England
- Founded: 2008
- Affiliation: World Bowls
- Location: Royal Leamington Spa
- Chairman: Jo Doust
- CEO: Jon Cockcroft
- Replaced: English Bowling Association and English Women’s Bowling Association
- (founded): 1903

Official website
- www.bowlsengland.com
- (England)

Bowls England governs the game of flat green outdoor bowls for men and women in England. The organisation is responsible for the promotion and development of lawn bowls in England, and is affiliated with the world governing body World Bowls.

== History ==
Bowls in England had been played for centuries, with the first documented evidence of a green having been in existence in Southampton during 1550, although the 'old green' is believed to have existed long before this. Despite such a long history, England failed to organise a national body before their Scottish counterparts and the first English reginal body was the 1882 Northumberland and Durham BA.

The Imperial Bowling Association was created in 1899, although this was also designed to assist the organisation of bowls in other countries and did not have permission to use the Scottish Association's rules. The legendary cricketer W.G. Grace finally pulled the various county associations together on 8 June 1903 to form the English Bowling Association and Grace was elected its first president and the Scottish rules were adopted.

The English national bowls championships were inaugurated in 1905 and on 7 October 1931, the English Women's Bowling Association was formed at the York Hotel.

Bowls England was formed on 1 January 2008 following a merger of the English Bowling Association and the English Women's Bowling Association. The headquarters of Bowls England are located in Victoria Park, Leamington Spa, following a spell at Warwick District Council's headquarters at Riverside House near the park.

Victoria Park, Leamington Spa, having moved from Worthing in 2013. The move was partly due to the fact that both the men's and women's national championships are held at Victoria Park, just five minutes walk away.

There are thirty-five affiliated county bowling associations, to which a total of 2,700 clubs are in membership nationwide. Approximately 100,000 players come under the jurisdiction of this association.

== See also ==
English national bowls championships

== Bibliography ==
- Rae, Simon (1998). W.G.Grace: A Life. ISBN 978-0-571-17855-1.
