= Sophie Tolchard =

English lawn bowler (born 1991)

Personal information
- Nationality: British (English)
- Born: 2 October 1991 (age 34) Torquay, England

Sport
- Sport: Lawn bowls
- Club: Kings BC, Torquay

Achievements and titles
- Highest world ranking: 6 (August 2024)
Medal record
Representing England
World Outdoor Championships
Bronze medal – third place	2016 Christchurch	pairs
Gold medal – first place	2023 Gold Coast	fours
Bronze medal – third place	2023 Gold Coast	pairs
Silver medal – second place	2023 Gold Coast	team
Commonwealth Games
Gold medal – first place	2014 Glasgow	triples
Silver medal – second place	2022 Birmingham	pairs
Atlantic Bowls Championships
Silver medal – second place	2015 Paphos	triples
British Isles Championships
Gold medal – first place	2012	triples
Gold medal – first place	2017	pairs
Gold medal – first place	2017	triples
Gold medal – first place	2019	fours
Gold medal – first place	2023	singles
Gold medal – first place	2024	triples
English Nationals
Gold medal – first place	2011	triples
Gold medal – first place	2015	singles
Gold medal – first place	2016	pairs
Gold medal – first place	2016	triples
Gold medal – first place	2018	singles
Gold medal – first place	2018	fours
Gold medal – first place	2019	singles2w
Gold medal – first place	2021	triples
Gold medal – first place	2022	pairs
Gold medal – first place	2023	triples

Sophie Tolchard (born 2 October 1991) is an English international lawn bowler. She reached a career high ranking of world number 6 in August 2024.

== Bowls career ==
=== World Championships ===
In 2016, she won a pairs bronze medal with Ellen Falkner at the 2016 World Outdoor Bowls Championship in Christchurch.

In 2023, she was selected as part of the team to represent England at the 2023 World Outdoor Bowls Championship. She participated in the women's pairs and the women's fours events. In the fours, her team won the gold medal defeating Australia in the final and one week later in the pairs, she won a bronze medal partnering Amy Pharaoh.

=== Commonwealth Games ===
Sophie has competed at three Commonwealth Games for England. The first in the women's triples at the 2014 Commonwealth Games, where she won a gold medal with partners Ellen Falkner and Sian Gordon. The second was in 2018, when she was selected as part of the English team for the 2018 Commonwealth Games on the Gold Coast in Queensland.

In 2022, she competed in the women's pairs and the Women's fours at the 2022 Commonwealth Games. In the pairs with Amy Pharaoh she secured a silver medal.

=== Atlantic Bowls Championship ===
In 2015, she won the triples silver medal at the Atlantic Bowls Championships. In 2020, she was selected for the 2020 World Outdoor Bowls Championship in Australia.

=== National Championships ===
She has won nine National Championships, three of which have been in the National singles. The recent successes were in 2018 when she beat Amy Gowshall in the singles and was also part of the winning fours, the 2019 Two wood singles, the 2021 triples, with Harriet Stevens and Emma Cooper and the 2022 pairs with Stevens.

In 2023, she won the singles title at the British Isles Bowls Championships, held in Ayr. It was her fifth British Isles title. Later in August, she won the triples with Nicole Rogers and Harriet Stevens, at the 2023 Bowls England National Finals to claim her tenth national title. The three women then went on to win the triples title at the 2024 British Isles Bowls Championships.

== Personal life ==
She is the sister of England international bowler Sam Tolchard. She now works part-time for Coreus.
