= Victoria Park, Leamington Spa =

Public park in Leamington Spa, Warwickshire, England

Coordinates: 52.287°N 1.545°W

Victoria Park is a public park in Leamington Spa, Warwickshire, England. It is situated about half a mile (800 m) west of the town centre and is on the south bank of the River Leam. The total area of the park as it stands today is 18.5 acres (7.5 ha).

== History & Features ==
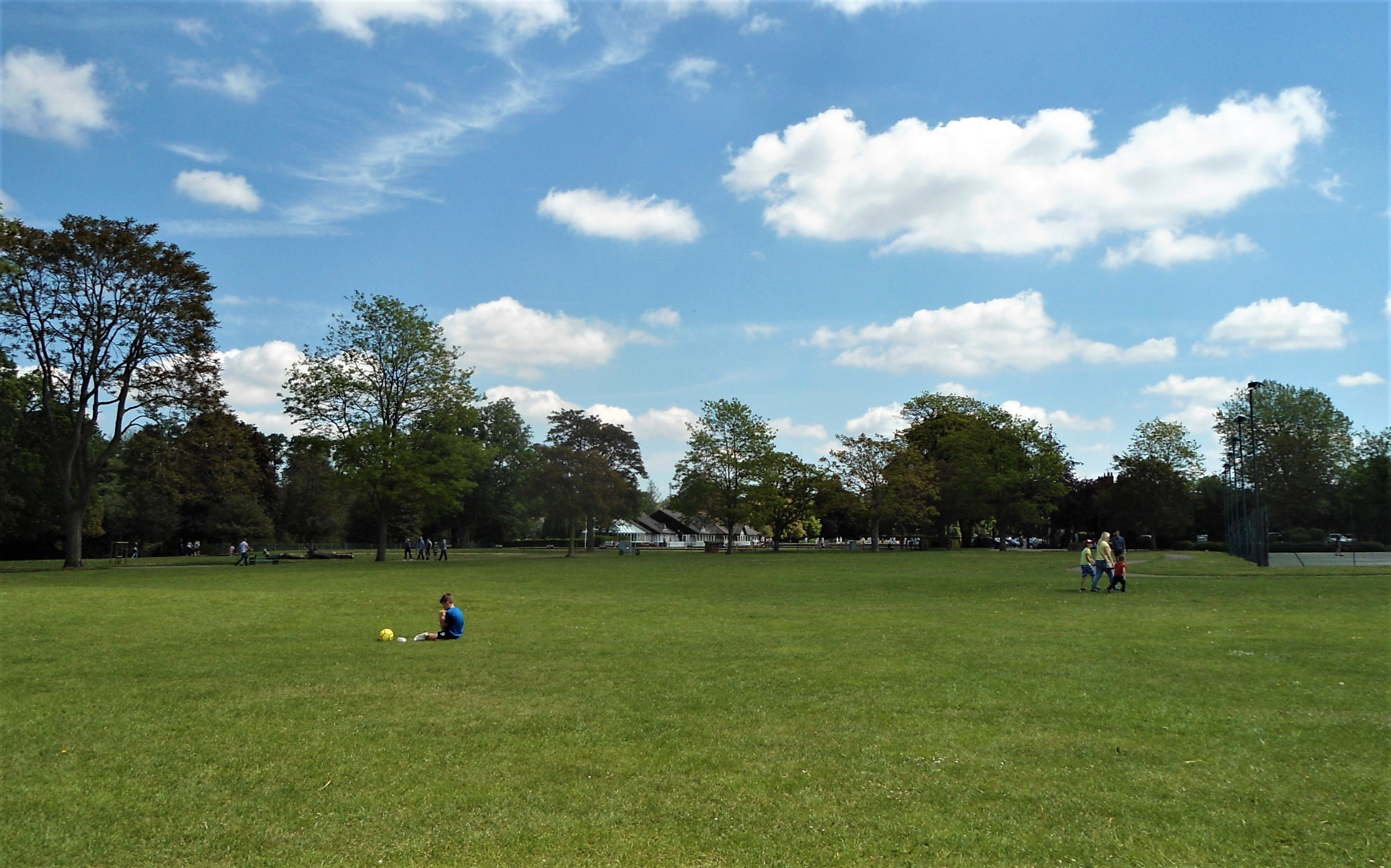
The park in May 2019

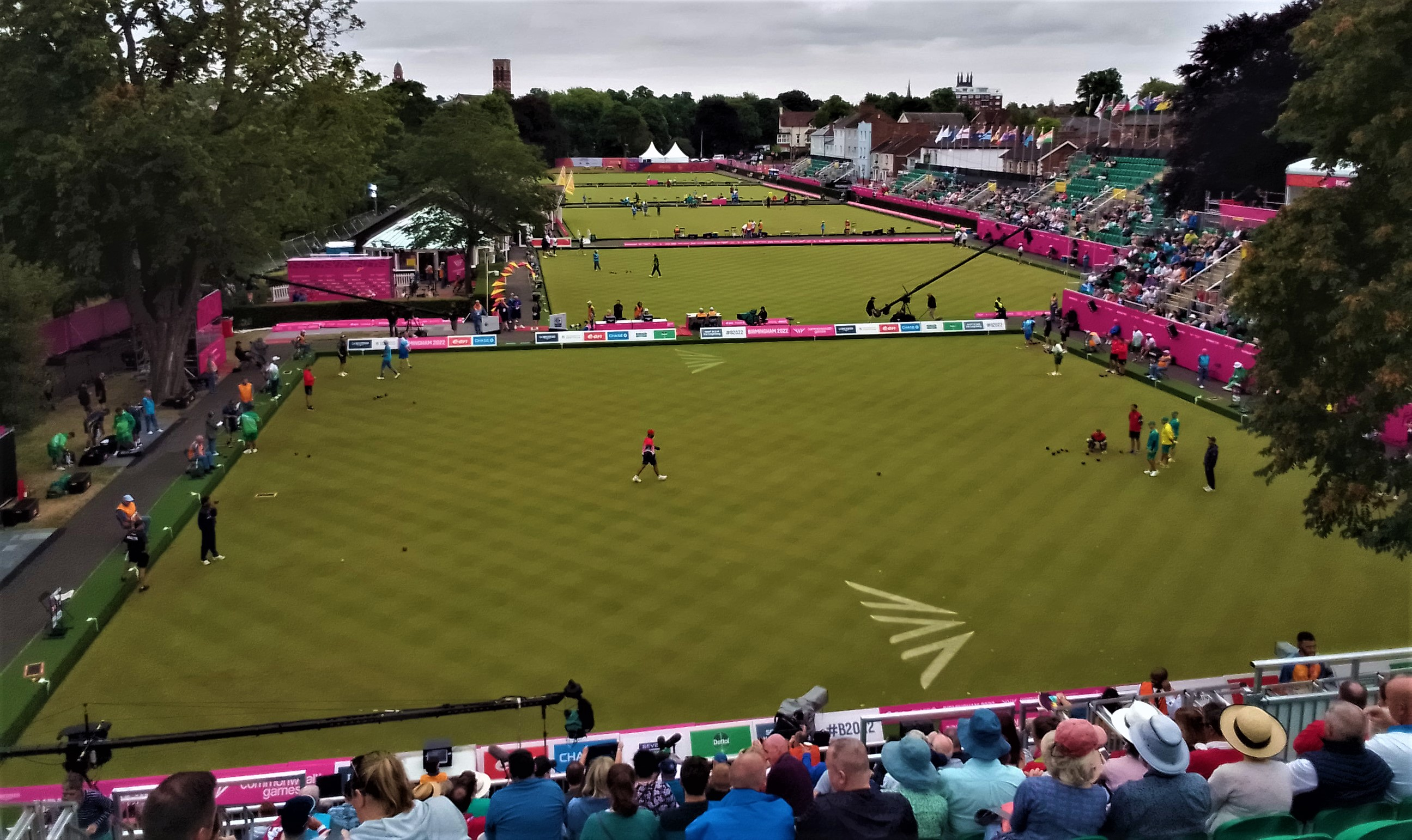
2022 Commonwealth Games

Up until the 1830s the park was just part of farmland on the edge of the growing spa town. It was at that time that one of the local land owning families, the Willes, began to hold archery competitions on the land. In the middle of the nineteenth century Leamington Cricket club made their first home there and in the 1860s the New Riverside Walk was opened. The park was extensively landscaped and redesigned in 1899 to celebrate the Diamond Jubilee of Queen Victoria. Before the Royal Show moved to Stoneleigh Park one of its venues was Victoria Park.

The bowling greens are amongst the best in England, hosting the English Men's and Women's Bowling Championships annually as well as the Women's event at the 2004 World Outdoor Bowls Championship and 1996 World Outdoor Bowls Championship. The bowling greens hosted the lawn bowls events at the 2022 Commonwealth Games where temporary stands seating 5,000 people were used. Most of Leamington's municipal tennis courts are located in the park (more are located at the top of The Parade) as well as extensive children's play areas, a skate park, a paddling pool, and a cafe. The park was chosen to host the 2007 European Race Walking Cup.

== See also ==
- Royal Pump Room Gardens

== Notes ==
- Cave, Lyndon (1988), Royal Leamington Spa, Phillmore & Co, Chichester
