= 1995 World Indoor Bowls Championship =

World Indoor Championships 1995
- 17th World Indoor Bowls Championships
- Location: (England) Preston, Lancashire
- Date: 14–27 February 1995.
- Category: World Indoor Championships

The 1995 Churchill Insurance World Indoor Bowls Championship was held at Preston Guild Hall, Preston, England, from 14–27 February 1995. Andy Thomson won his second consecutive title beating Richard Corsie in the final.
Richard Corsie & Alex Marshall won the Pairs title.

The Women's World Championship took place in Cumbernauld from April 5–7. The event was sponsored by Churchill Insurance and was won by Joyce Lindores.

== Winners ==
Event	Winner
Men's Singles	(England) Andy Thomson
Women's Singles	(Scotland) Joyce Lindores
Men's Pairs	(Scotland) Richard Corsie & (Scotland) Alex Marshall

== Draw and results ==
=== Men's singles ===
First round
1	(England) Andy Thomson	3
(Jersey) David Le Marquand	0
16	(Scotland) Alex Marshall	3
(Canada) Peter Mutter	1
8	(England) Gary Smith	2
(New Zealand) Rowan Brassey	3
9	(Scotland) Graham Robertson	2
(Wales) Robert Weale	3
4	(England) Wynne Richards	3
(Northern Ireland) Jeremy Henry	1
13	(Scotland) Hugh Duff	3
(Scotland) Jan Woodley +	2
5	(England) Tony Allcock	3
(Australia) Steve Glasson	1
12	(Scotland) Willie Wood	2
(South Africa) Neil Burkett	3
3	(Hong Kong) Mark McMahon	3
(Guernsey) Adrian Welch	0
14	(Australia) Ian Taylor	3
(Wales) Jason Greenslade	2
6	(Wales) Stephen Rees	3
(New Zealand) Andrew Curtain	1
11	(England) Mervyn King	3
(Republic of Ireland) Jackie Smyth +	0
2	(Scotland) Richard Corsie	3
(England) Russell Morgan	0
15	(Australia) Cameron Curtis	3
(England) Paul Bennett	0
7	(Wales) John Price	3
(New Zealand) Paul Foster	1
10	(Australia) Ian Schuback	3
(Republic of Ireland) Margaret Johnston +	1

Second round
1	(England) Thomson	3
16	(Scotland) Marshall	0
(New Zealand) Brassey	3
(Wales) Weale	1
4	(England) Richards	2
13	(Scotland) Duff	3
5	(England) Allcock	3
(South Africa) Burkett	2
3	(Hong Kong) McMahon	3
14	(Australia) Taylor	1
6	(Wales) Rees	1
11	(England) King	3
2	(Scotland) Corsie	3
15	(Australia) Curtis	0
7	(Wales) Price	1
10	(Australia) Schuback	3

Quarter-finals
1	(England) Thomson	3
(New Zealand) Brassey	1
13	(Scotland) Duff	2
5	(England) Allcock	3
3	(Hong Kong) McMahon	2
11	(England) King	3
2	(Scotland) Corsie	3
10	(Australia) Schuback	2

Semi-finals
1	(England) Thomson	3
5	(England) Allcock	2
Final
1	(England) Thomson	7	7	7
2	(Scotland) Corsie	2	6	3
11	(England) King	3
2	(Scotland) Corsie	0

+ Margaret Johnston, Jan Woodley & Jackie Smyth were invited to play in the Men's Singles event.

=== Men's Pairs ===
First round

Quarter-finals

Semi-finals

Final

1
(Australia) Ian Schuback

(Australia) Cameron Curtis

3

(Wales) Peter Johnson

(Wales) Michael Kent

1

1
(Australia) Schuback

(Australia) Curtis

3

8
(Northern Ireland) David Corkill

(Northern Ireland) Roy Hattersby

3

8
(Northern Ireland) Corkill

(Northern Ireland) Battersby

2

(South Africa) Neil Burkett

(Canada) Peter Mutter

2

1
(Australia) Schuback

(Australia) Curtis

4
2
2

4
(Wales) John Price

(Wales) Stephen Rees

3

5
(Scotland) Corsie

(Scotland) Marshall

7
7
7

(Jersey) David Le Marquand

(Guernsey) Adrian Welch

1

4
(Wales) Price

(Wales) Rees

2

5
(Scotland) Richard Corsie

(Scotland) Alex Marshall

3

5
(Scotland) Marshall

(Scotland) Corsie

3

(New Zealand) Andrew Curtain

(New Zealand) Rowan Brassey

1

5
(Scotland) Corsie

(Scotland) Marshall

6
7
7
1
7

2
(England) Gary Smith

(England) Andy Thomson

3

3
(England) Allcock

(England) Bryant

7
4
3
7
4

(England) Russell Morgan

(England) Colin Piper

1

2
(England) Smith

(England) Thomson

3

7
(Scotland) Hugh Duff

(Scotland) David Miller

3

7
(Scotland) Duff

(Scotland) Miller

2

(Australia) Steve Glasson

(Australia) Ian Taylor

1

2
(England) Smith

(England) Thomson

7
6
6
3

3
(England) Tony Allcock

(England) David Bryant

3

3
(England) Allcock

(England) Bryant

5
7
7
7

(Northern Ireland) Jeremy Henry

(Northern Ireland) Noel Graham

2

3
(England) Allcock

(England) Bryant

3

6
(Scotland) Graham Robertson

(Hong Kong) Mark McMahon

3

6
(Scotland) Robertson

(Hong Kong) McMahon

0

(England) Greg Harlow

(England) Mervyn King

2

=== Women's singles ===
Quarter-finals
(Scotland) Joyce Lindores	7	0	7	7
(Jersey) Valerie Stead	0	7	0	3
(Wales) Julie Davies	7	7	0	4	7
(England) Mary Price	6	5	7	7	4
(Northern Ireland) Margaret Johnston	7	3	7	7
(New Zealand) Marlene Castle	1	7	2	2
(Guernsey) Anne Simon	7	5	7	7
(Republic of Ireland) P Smythe	3	7	4	3

Semi-finals
(Scotland) Lindores	0	7	7	7
(Wales) Davies	7	6	1	5
(Northern Ireland) Johnston	7	6	7	7
(Guernsey) Simon	6	7	1	1

Final
(Scotland) Lindores	7	3	2	7	7
(Northern Ireland) Johnston	0	7	7	3	3
