= 1996 World Indoor Bowls Championship =

World Indoor Championships 1996
- 18th World Indoor Bowls Championships
- Location: (England) Preston, Lancashire
- Date: 11–24 February 1996.
- Category: World Indoor Championships

The 1996 Churchill Insurance World Indoor Bowls Championship was held at Preston Guild Hall, Preston, England, from 11–24 February 1996. David Gourlay won the title beating Hugh Duff in the final.
Ian Schuback and Kelvin Kerkow won the Pairs title.

The Women's World Championship took place in Guernsey from April 20–21. The event was won by Sandy Hazell.

== Winners ==
Event	Winner
Men's Singles	(Scotland) David Gourlay
Women's Singles	(England) Sandy Hazell
Men's Pairs	(Australia) Ian Schuback & (Australia) Kelvin Kerkow

== Draw and results ==
=== Men's singles ===
First round
1	(England) Andy Thomson	7	7	7
(Australia) Kelvin Kerkow	5	6	5
16	(Northern Ireland) David Corkill	7	7	7
(Hong Kong) Tony Tong	5	2	0
8	(Scotland) Graham Robertson	6	3	7	7	7
(South Africa) Neil Burkett	7	7	5	1	0
9	(England) Wynne Richards	5	7	3	7	7
(Canada) Mark Gilliland	7	1	7	4	4
4	(Australia) Ian Schuback	4	7	1	7	7
(England) Ian Bond	7	3	7	3	4
13	(Australia) Ian Taylor	2	7	3	7	7
(Jersey) Lee Nixon	7	5	7	4	2
5	(Scotland) Hugh Duff	7	7	7
(Wales) Martyn Roberts	6	0	2
12	(England) Gary Smith	7	7	7
(Scotland) Steve Rankin	4	2	3
3	(Australia) Mark McMahon	6	6	7	7	3
(England) Greg Harlow	7	7	5	2	7
14	(New Zealand) Rowan Brassey	7	5	7	1	4
(Guernsey) Adrian Welch	3	7	5	7	7
6	(England) Tony Allcock	5	6	7	7	6
(Scotland) David Gourlay	7	7	4	3	7
11	(Wales) John Price	7	7	7
(Republic of Ireland) Margaret Johnston +	1	2	2
2	(Scotland) Richard Corsie	2	2	7	2
(Republic of Ireland) Jeremy Henry	7	7	4	7
15	(Scotland) Paul Conlan	5	7	2	7	4
(Australia) Adam Jeffery	7	5	7	2	7
7	(England) Mervyn King	7	7	7
(New Zealand) Sid Giddy	3	5	6
10	(Wales) Stephen Rees	2	7	7	5	7
(Scotland) Joyce Lindores +	7	6	2	7	1

Second round
1	(England) Thomson	7	7	7
16	(Northern Ireland) Corkhill	6	6	2
8	(Scotland) Robertson	5	7	5	7	5
9	(England) Richards	7	2	7	5	7
(England) Bond	7	7	7
13	(Australia) Taylor	3	0	7
5	(Scotland) Duff	7	7	7
12	(England) Smith	6	5	4
(England) Harlow	3	7	7	7
(Guernsey) Welch	7	3	4	6
(Scotland) Gourlay	7	5	7	7
11	(Wales) Price	3	7	5	3
(Republic of Ireland) Henry	7	7	7
(Australia) Jeffery	3	2	4
7	(England) King	7	5	7	4	7
10	(Wales) Rees	2	7	0	7	4

Quarter-finals
1	(England) Thomson	6	4	7	7	7
9	(England) Richards	7	7	6	2	4
(England) Bond	7	6	0	7	1
5	(Scotland) Duff	5	7	7	4	7
(England) Harlow	6	2	1
(Scotland) Gourlay	7	7	7
(Republic of Ireland) Henry	5	7	5	0
7	(England) King	7	0	7	7

Semi-finals
1	(England) Thomson	7	7	4	5	5
5	(Scotland) Duff	3	3	7	7	7
Final
5	(Scotland) Duff	7	5	6	7	1
(Scotland) Gourlay	2	7	7	3	7
(Scotland) Gourlay	6	2	7	7	7
7	(England) King	7	7	3	4	1

==== Notes ====
+ Margaret Johnston & Joyce Lindores were invited to play in the Men's Singles event.
Mark McMahon formerly of Hong Kong switched nations to represent Australia.

=== Men's Pairs ===
First round

Quarter-finals

Semi-finals

Final

1
(Scotland) Alex Marshall

(Scotland) Richard Corsie

7
6
7
7

(Wales) Wayne Letman

(Wales) Phil Rowlands

2
7
1
4

1
(Scotland) Marshall

(Scotland) Corsie

7
3
7
7

8
(New Zealand) Rowan Brassey

(New Zealand) Sid Giddy

7
7
7

8
(New Zealand) Brassey

(New Zealand) Giddy

5
7
4
3

(Northern Ireland) Noel Graham

(Northern Ireland) Ian McClure

6
4
6

1
(Scotland) Marshall

(Scotland) Corsie

0
7
7
6
5

4
(Australia) Kelvin Kerkow

(Australia) Ian Schuback

6
7
7
7

4
(Australia) Kerkow

(Australia) Schuback

7
2
5
7
7

(Scotland) David Slaven

(Scotland) John Jackson

7
3
3
5

4
(Australia) Kerkow

(Australia) Schuback

2
7
7
7

5
(Australia) Mark McMahon

(Australia) Ian Taylor

7
7
7

5
(Australia) McMahon

(Australia) Taylor

7
4
0
0

(Jersey) Lee Nixon

(Guernsey) Adrian Welch

3
2
6

4
(Australia) Kerkow

(Australia) Schuback

7
2
7
4
7

2
(England) Tony Allcock

(England) David Bryant

4
3
7
7
6

3
(England) Thomson

(England) Smith

5
7
6
7
4

(England) Stuart Airey

(England) David Taylor

7
7
4
2
7

(England) Airey

(England) Taylor

6
7
3
4

7
(Northern Ireland) Roy Battersby

(Northern Ireland) David Corkill

3

7
(Northern Ireland) Batterbsy

(Northern Ireland) Corkill

7
6
7
7

(South Africa) Neil Burkett

(Australia) Adam Jeffery

2

7
(Northern Ireland) Battersby

(Northern Ireland) Corkill

2

3
(England) Andy Thomson

(England) Gary Smith

7
7
7

3
(England) Thomson

(England) Smith

3

(Canada) Mark Gilliland

(Hong Kong) Tony Tong

3
2
2

3
(England) Thomson

(England) Smith

7
7
7

6
(Scotland) Hugh Duff

(Scotland) David Gourlay

7
2
7
7

6
(Scotland) Duff

(Scotland) Gourlay

6
3
4

(Wales) Garfield Phillips

(Wales) Cliff Williams

2
7
0
4

== Women's singles ==
Quarter-finals
(England) Sandy Hazell
(Scotland) Kate Adams
(England) Jean Baker
(Wales) Betty Morgan

Semi-finals
(England) Hazell	3	7	7	7
(Scotland) Adams	7	0	5	5
(England) Baker	4	7	5	7	7
(Wales) Morgan	7	4	7	4	6

Final
(England) Hazell	7	7	7
(England) Baker	4	1	1
