= 1992 World Indoor Bowls Championship =

World Indoor Championships 1992
- 14th World Indoor Bowls Championships
- Location: (England) Preston, Lancashire
- Date(s): 21 February - 01 March, 1992.
- Category: World Indoor Championships

The 1992 Midland Bank World Indoor Bowls Championship was held at Preston Guild Hall, Preston, England, from 21 February - 1 March 1992.

In the Singles Ian Schuback won the title beating John Price in the final. Schuback had beaten David Holt in the quarter-finals in a match that lasted four hours 45 minutes. In the Pairs David Bryant and Tony Allcock secured their sixth world title and fourth consecutive title.

The Women's World Indoor Championship took place in Guernsey during April with the final being held on 5 April. The event was won by Sarah Gourlay.

== Winners ==
Event	Winner
Men's Singles	(Australia) Ian Schuback
Women's Singles	(Scotland) Sarah Gourlay
Men's Pairs	(England) Tony Allcock & (England) David Bryant

== Draw and results ==
=== Men's singles ===
First round
2	(Australia) Ian Schuback	7	7	4	5	7
(England) Mel Biggs	5	4	7	7	6
(New Zealand) Gary Lawson	7	7	7
15	(Scotland) Graham Robertson	6	6	4
7	(Scotland) Hugh Duff	7	5	7	7
(Northern Ireland) Ian McClure	2	7	5	2
(England) David Holt	7	7	2	7
10	(Scotland) Willie Wood	5	5	7	5
6	(England) Gary Smith	7	7	1	7
(Canada) Keith Roney	4	1	7	1
11	(Northern Ireland) David Corkill	2	7	6	7	7
(Israel) Cecil Bransky	7	0	7	6	6
14	(England) Wynne Richards	7	7	3	7
(New Zealand) Rowan Brassey	2	2	7	0
3	(England) Tony Allcock	2	7	7	7
(Canada) Peter Mutter	7	6	4	2
8	(Wales) John Price	7	7	7
(Australia) Trevor Morris	2	2	4
9	(Australia) Rob Parrella	7	6	5	7	7
(Wales) Carl Lewis	0	7	7	5	3
16	(Northern Ireland) Jim Baker	7	7	7
(New Zealand) Brian Baldwin	5	5	2
1	(Scotland) Richard Corsie	7	5	7	7
(Wales) Jason Greenslade	2	7	3	2
12	(Wales) Stephen Rees	7	7	5	7
(Guernsey) Adrian Welch	3	4	7	2
(England) Jim McCann	7	7	7
5	(Hong Kong) Mark McMahon	3	2	3
4	(England) Andy Thomson	2	7	7	7
(Scotland) Alex Marshall	7	4	4	5
13	(England) David Bryant	7	7	7
(Jersey) Lee Nixon	2	4	3

Second round
2	(Australia) Schuback	7	5	7	7
(New Zealand) Lawson	4	7	0	2
7	(Scotland) Duff
(England) Holt
6	(England) Smith	7	3	4	7	7
11	(Northern Ireland) Corkill	2	7	7	1	4
14	(England) Richards	7	2	2	7	7
3	(England) Allcock	0	7	7	5	5
8	(Wales) Price	7	7	6	7
9	(Australia) Parella	6	5	7	6
16	(Northern Ireland) Baker	7	4	2	7	7
1	(Scotland) Corsie	2	7	7	6	4
12	(Wales) Rees	7	7	4	7
(Scotland) McCann	6	6	7	1
4	(England) Thomson	7	7	2	1	7
13	(England) Bryant	2	6	7	7	6

Quarter-finals
2	(Australia) Schuback	3	7	7	2	7
(England) Holt	7	0	6	7	6
6	(England) Smith	6	2	7	7	7
14	(England) Richards	7	7	1	3	0
8	(Wales) Price	7	5	7	4	7
16	(Northern Ireland) Baker	4	7	3	7	2
12	(Wales) Rees	7	7	7
4	(England) Thomson	6	1	1

Semi-finals
2	(Australia) Schuback	2	7	7	6	7
6	(England) Smith	7	1	4	7	6
Final
2	(Australia) Schuback	5	7	7	7
8	(Wales) Price	7	6	6	4
8	(Wales) Price	7	7	6	5	7
12	(Wales) Rees	4	6	7	7	5

=== Men's Pairs ===
First round

Quarter-finals

Semi-finals

Final

1
(England) David Bryant

(England) Tony Allcock

7
7
5
7

(Republic of Ireland) Ronnie Garland

(Republic of Ireland) Victor McCrea

1
2
7
2

1
(England) Bryant

(England) Allcock

5
7
0
7
7

(England) Mel Biggs

(England) Wynne Richards

7
5
7
7

(England) Biggs

(England) Richards

7
4
7
4
0

(Jersey) Lee Nixon

(Guernsey) Adrian Welch

2
7
6
1

1
(England) Bryant

(England) Allcock

3
7
7
1
7

(Northern Ireland) Ian McClure

(Northern Ireland) Stephen Adamson

1
7
2
7
7

(Northern Ireland) McClure

(Northern Ireland) Adamson

7
1
5
7
3

4
(England) Andy Thomson

(England) Gary Smith

7
5
7
6
6

(Northern Ireland) McClure

(Northern Ireland) Adamson

7
7
4
5
7

5
(Israel) Cecil Bransky

(Hong Kong) Mark McMahon

0
7
7
4
7

5
(Israel) Bransky

(Hong Kong) McMahon

5
4
7
7
3

(Wales) W Killa

(Wales) Brian Kingdon

7
1
0
7
2

1
(England) Bryant

(England) Allcock

7
7
4
7

(Australia) Rob Parrella

(Australia) Ian Schuback

7
4
4
7
7

(Australia) Parrella

(Australia) Schuback

5
3
7
4

(Scotland) David Gourlay Jr.

(Scotland) Robert McCulloch

5
7
7
1
5

(Australia) Parrella

(Australia) Schuback

7
7
7

(New Zealand) Brian Baldwin

(New Zealand) Rowan Brassey

(New Zealand) Baldwin

(New Zealand) Brassey

2
2
5

(Australia) Parrella

(Australia) Schuback

7
7
7

2
(Scotland) Richard Corsie

(Scotland) Willie Wood

7
7
7

2
(Scotland) Corsie

(Scotland) Wood

4
5
6

(New Zealand) Gary Lawson

(Australia) Trevor Morris

2
6
2

2
(Scotland) Corsie

(Scotland) Wood

7
7
7

7
(Scotland) Graham Robertson

(Scotland) Jim Muir

7
7
7

7
(Scotland) Robertson

(Scotland) Muir

0
1
5

(Wales) Jason Greenslade

(Wales) David Harding

3
3
0

== Women's singles ==
=== Group stages ===
Group A
Player 1	Player 2	Score
Cameron	Woodley	4-7 7-6 7-4
Letham	Dingle	7-1 7-2
Cameron	Dingle	7-2 7-0
Letham	Woodley	7-3 7-3
Letham	Cameron	7-4 7-2
Woodley	Dingle	5-7 7-1 7-2

Group B
Player 1	Player 2	Score
Froud	Hankin	7-3 7-4
Nicolle	Bell	7-1 7-2
Hankin	Nicolle	7-2 7-5
Froud	Bell	7-2 7-3
Hankin	Bell	7-3 7-1
Nicolle	Froud	5-7 7-2 7-3

Pos	Player	P	W
1	(Scotland) Margaret Letham	3	3
2	(England) Barbara Cameron	3	2
3	(England) Lorraine Woodley	3	1
4	(Jersey) Sue Dingle	3	0

Pos	Player	P	W
1	(Wales) Sylvia Froud	3	2
2	(England) Doreen Hankin	3	2
3	(Guernsey) Jenny Nicolle	3	2
3	(Republic of Ireland) Eileen Bell	3	0

Group C
Player 1	Player 2	Score
Gourlay	le Feuvre	7-1 7-5
Stead	Jones	7-6 7-3
Jones	Gourlay	5-7 7-4 7-6
Stead	le Feuvre	2-7 7-0 7-6
Gourlay	Stead	7-4 2-7 7-4
le Feuvre	Jones	7-2 7-6

Pos	Player	P	W
1	(Jersey) Val Stead	3	2
2	(Scotland) Sarah Gourlay	3	2
3	(Guernsey) Wilma le Feuvre	3	1
4	(Wales) M Jones	3	1

=== Knockout ===
Quarter-finals
(Scotland) Sarah Gourlay	7	2	7	7
(Northern Ireland) Margaret Letham	2	7	3	1
(Northern Ireland) Margaret Johnston	0	7	7	7
(England) Doreen Hankin	7	3	3	2
(England) Mary Price	3	7	7	7
(Northern Ireland) Barbara Cameron	7	3	3	3
(Wales) Sylvia Froud	0	7	7	7
(Jersey) Val Stead	7	4	3	0

Semi-finals
(Scotland) Gourlay	7	0	7	4	7
(Northern Ireland) Johnston	3	7	5	7	0
(England) Price	7	7	7
(Wales) Froud	5	5	2

Final
(Scotland) Gourlay	4	7	7	7
(England) Price	7	0	3	2
