= 1997 World Indoor Bowls Championship =

Bowls competition

World Indoor Championships 1997
- 19th World Indoor Bowls Championships
- Location: (England) Preston, Lancashire
- Date: 23 January – 2 February 1997
- Category: World Indoor Championships

The 1997 SAGA World World Indoor Bowls Championship was held at Preston Guild Hall, Preston, England, from 23 January – 2 February 1997. In the singles Hugh Duff won his second title beating Andy Thomson in the final. In the pairs Tony Allcock won his seventh title in his first partnering with Mervyn King.

The Women's World Championship sponsored by British Steel took place in Llanelli from 19–20 April. The event was won by Norma Shaw.

== Winners ==
| Event | Winner |
|---|---|
| Men's Singles | (Scotland) Hugh Duff |
| Women's Singles | (England) Norma Shaw |
| Men's Pairs | (England) Tony Allcock & (England) Mervyn King |

== Draw and results ==
=== Men's singles ===
First round
1 | (Scotland) David Gourlay | 3
(Israel) Jeff Rabkin | 1
16 | (England) Greg Harlow | 3
(Australia) Kelvin Kerkow | 0
8 | (Australia) Mark McMahon | 3
(New Zealand) Kevin Schischka | 0
9 | (Scotland) Graham Robertson | 1
(Australia) Steve Glasson | 3
4 | (Scotland) Hugh Duff | 3
(England) Mark Bantock | 1
13 | (England) Gary Smith | 3
(Hong Kong) Tony Tong | 1
5 | (England) Tony Allcock | 3
(Jersey) Adrian Welch | 1
12 | (Wales) Stephen Rees | 3
(Wales) Andrew Bushell | 0
3 | (Scotland) Richard Corsie | 3
(Canada) Steve Wojcik | 0
14 | (Australia) Ian Taylor | 0
(New Zealand) Rowan Brassey | 3
6 | (England) Mervyn King | 3
(Northern Ireland) David Corkill | 0
11 | (Wales) John Price | 3
(Scotland) Paul Foster | 0
2 | (England) Andy Thomson | 3
(Northern Ireland) Phil McFall | 1
15 | (Republic of Ireland) Jeremy Henry | 2
(South Africa) Neil Burkett | 3
7 | (England) Wynne Richards | 3
(Jersey) David Le Marquand | 1
10 | (Australia) Ian Schuback | 3
(Scotland) David Peacock | 0

Second round
1 | (Scotland) Gourlay | 2
16 | (England) Harlow | 3
8 | (Australia) McMahon | 2
(Australia) Glasson | 3
4 | (Scotland) Duff | 3
13 | (England) Smith | 2
5 | (England) Allcock | 3
12 | (Wales) Rees | 1
3 | (Scotland) Corsie | 2
(New Zealand) Brassey | 3
6 | (England) King | 3
11 | (Wales) Price | 2
2 | (England) Thomson | 3
(South Africa) Burkett | 1
7 | (England) Richards | 0
10 | (Australia) Schuback | 3

Quarter-finals
16 | (England) Harlow | 3
(Australia) Glasson | 0
4 | (Scotland) Duff | 3
5 | (England) Allcock | 2
(New Zealand) Brassey | 3
6 | (England) King | 1
2 | (England) Thomson | 3
10 | (Australia) Schuback | 1

Semi-finals
16 | (England) Harlow | 1
4 | (Scotland) Duff | 3
Final
4 | (Scotland) Duff | 7 | 7 | 7
2 | (England) Thomson | 4 | 3 | 4
(New Zealand) Brassey | 2
2 | (England) Thomson | 3

=== Men's Pairs ===
First round

Quarter-finals

Semi-finals

Final

4
(England) Mervyn King

(England) Tony Allcock

3

(New Zealand) Rowan Brassey

(New Zealand) Kevin Schischka

2

4
(England) King

(England) Allcock

3

5
(Wales) John Price

(Wales) Stephen Rees

3

5
(Wales) Price

(Wales) Rees

2

(Hong Kong) Tony Tong

(Canada) Steve Wojcik

1

4
(England) King

(England) Allcock

3

1
(Australia) Kelvin Kerkow

(Australia) Ian Schuback

3

1
(Australia) Kerkow

(Australia) Schuback

0

(Northern Ireland) Mark McPeak

(Northern Ireland) Brian McPeak

1

1
(Australia) Schuback

(Australia) Kerkow

3

(Jersey) David Le Marquand

(Guernsey) Adrian Welch

3

(Jersey) Le Marquand

(Guernsey) Welch

1

8
(South Africa) Neil Burkett

(Israel) Jeff Rabkin

1

4
(England) King

(England) Allcock

7
5
7
7

2
(England) Andy Thomson

(England) Gary Smith

2

(England) Morley

(England) Robinson

0
7
6
4

(England) Brett Morley

(England) Duncan Robinson

3

(England) Morley

(England) Robinson

3

7
(Scotland) Hugh Duff

(Scotland) David Gourlay

3

7
(Scotland) Gourlay

(Scotland) DUff

2

(Scotland) Craig Richmond

(Scotland) Tommy Woods

2

(England) Morley

(England) Robinson

3

3
(Australia) Mark McMahon

(England) Wynne Richards

1

(Australia) Taylor

(Australia) Glasson

2

(Australia) Ian Taylor

(Australia) Steve Glasson

3

(Australia) Taylor

(Australia) Glasson

2

6
(Scotland) Richard Corsie

(Scotland) Graham Robertson

3

6
(Scotland) Corsie

(Scotland) Robertson

1

(Wales) Gareth Jones

(Wales) Gareth Williams

0

== Women's singles ==
=== Group stages ===
Group A
| Player 1 | Player 2 | Score |
|---|---|---|
| Hazell | Horman | 7-6 7-5 |
| Sutherland | Nolan | 7-0 7-6 |
| Sutherland | Hazell | 7-5 6-7 7-3 |
| Nolan | Horman | 7-4 1-7 7-6 |
| Sutherland | Horman | 7-6 7-1 |
| Hazell | Nolan | 7-6 7-0 |

Group B
| Player 1 | Player 2 | Score |
|---|---|---|
| Castle | Lowery | 7-1 4-7 7-6 |
| McAllister | Wilkinson | 7-4 6-7 7-6 |
| Castle | Wilkinson | 7-1 7-1 |
| McAllister | Lowery | 2-7 7-6 7-6 |
| McAllister | Castle | 3-7 7-2 7-3 |
| Wilkinson | Lowery | 7-0 2-7 7-6 |

| Pos | Player | P | W |
|---|---|---|---|
| 1 | (Wales) Ann Sutherland | 3 | 3 |
| 2 | (England) Sandy Hazell | 3 | 2 |
| 3 | (Republic of Ireland) Phyllis Nolan | 3 | 1 |
| 4 | (Jersey) Karina Horman | 3 | 0 |

| Pos | Player | P | W |
|---|---|---|---|
| 1 | (Scotland) Caroline McAllister | 3 | 3 |
| 2 | (New Zealand) Marlene Castle | 3 | 2 |
| 3 | (Republic of Ireland) Muriel Wilkinson | 3 | 1 |
| 3 | (Jersey) Jean Lowery | 3 | 0 |

Group C
| Player 1 | Player 2 | Score |
|---|---|---|
| Shaw | Forrest | 7-1 4-7 7-0 |
| McGarvie | Simon | 7-4 6-7 7-2 |
| Simon | Forrest | 7-1 7-5 |
| Shaw | McGarvie | 7-2 7-4 |
| Shaw | Simon | 7-4 7-1 |
| McGarvie | Forrest | 7-1 7-3 |

Group B
| Player 1 | Player 2 | Score |
|---|---|---|
| Roylance | Merrien | 7-6 7-0 |
| Lei Suk Man | Evans | 7-4 5-7 7-4 |
| Roylance | Evans | 7-4 7-2 |
| Merrien | Lei Suk Man | 7-5 7-3 |
| Evans | Merrien | 7-1 1-7 7-4 |
| Roylance | Lei Suk Man | 7-6 7-0 |

| Pos | Player | P | W |
|---|---|---|---|
| 1 | (England) Norma Shaw | 3 | 3 |
| 2 | (Scotland) Evelyn McGarvie | 3 | 2 |
| 3 | (Guernsey) Ann Simon | 3 | 1 |
| 4 | (Canada) R Forrest | 3 | 0 |

| Pos | Player | P | W |
|---|---|---|---|
| 1 | (England) Jayne Roylance | 3 | 3 |
| 2 | (Guernsey) Alison Merrien | 3 | 1 |
| 3 | (Hong Kong) Lei Suk Man | 3 | 1 |
| 3 | (Wales) Linda Evans | 3 | 1 |

=== Knockout ===
Quarter-finals
(England) Norma Shaw | 7 | 7 | 3 | 7
(England) Sandy Hazell | 4 | 0 | 7 | 2
(New Zealand) Marlene Castle | 7 | 7 | 7
(England) Jayne Roylance | 3 | 3 | 6
(Scotland) Caroline McAllister | 7 | 4 | 7 | 1 | 7
(Scotland) Evelyn McGarvie | 5 | 7 | 0 | 7 | 3
(Guernsey) Alison Merrien | 2 | 7 | 7 | 7
(Wales) Ann Sutherland | 7 | 4 | 1 | 4

Semi-finals
(England) Shaw | 6 | 7 | 4 | 7 | 7
(New Zealand) Castle | 7 | 3 | 7 | 0 | 2
(Scotland) McAllister | 7 | 3 | 4 | 2 | 7
(Guernsey) Merrien | 4 | 6 | 7 | 7 | 5

Final
(England) Shaw | 2 | 7 | 3 | 7 | 7
(Scotland) McAllister | 7 | 3 | 7 | 0 | 5
