= 1991 World Indoor Bowls Championship =

World Indoor Championships 1991
- 13th World Indoor Bowls Championships
- Location: (England) Preston, Lancashire
- Date: 12–24 February 1991.
- Category: World Indoor Championships

The 1991 Midland Bank World Indoor Bowls Championship was held at Preston Guild Hall, Preston, England, from 12–24 February 1991.

In the Singles Richard Corsie won the title beating Ian Schuback in the final.
In the Pairs David Bryant and Tony Allcock secured their fifth world title.

The Women's Indoor World Championship took place in Guernsey during April with the final being held on 21 April. The title was won by Mary Price.

== Winners ==
Event	Winner
Men's Singles	(Scotland) Richard Corsie
Women's Singles	(England) Mary Price
Men's Pairs	(England) Tony Allcock & (England) David Bryant

== Draw and results ==
=== Men's singles ===
First round
13	(Scotland) Richard Corsie	7	7	7
(Wales) Lyn Tanner	2	1	0
4	(Scotland) Hugh Duff	7	7	7
(Australia) Trevor Morris	2	5	4
(Australia) Rob Parrella	4	3	7	7	7
(Scotland) Graham Robertson	7	7	3	6	4
(New Zealand) Maurice Symes	1	7	7	7
(Wales) Stephen Rees	7	1	3	3
(Hong Kong) Mark McMahon	3	7	7	7
(Northern Ireland) Jeremy Henry	7	3	0	5
8	(England) David Bryant	7	7	7
(Australia) Rex Johnston	0	4	4
(England) John Evans	1	7	5	7	7
1	(Wales) John Price	7	6	7	6	6
16	(Northern Ireland) Jim Baker	7	7	7
(Scotland) Tom McLees	1	1	2
3	(Australia) Ian Schuback	2	7	7	7
(Canada) Ronnie Jones	7	2	0	2
14	(Scotland) Jim Muir	4	7	7	3	7
(New Zealand) Rowan Brassey	7	1	4	7	5
6	(Scotland) Willie Wood	7	1	7	7
(Guernsey) Adrian Welch	1	7	6	3
11	(England) Wynne Richards	7	7	4	7
(Canada) Alf Wallace	1	2	7	4
2	(England) Tony Allcock	7	2	7	7
(Scotland) Ian Bruce	5	7	3	0
15	(England) Andy Thomson	7	7	5	5	7
(New Zealand) Brian Baldwin	3	3	7	7	6
7	(England) Gary Smith	7	7	4	1	7
(Northern Ireland) Alan McMullan	2	1	7	7	4
10	(Northern Ireland) David Corkill	3	7	7	7
(Wales) Phil Rowlands	7	3	2	5

Second round
13	(Scotland) Corsie	7	7	4	7
4	(Scotland) Duff	3	4	7	0
(Australia) Parrella	7	6	7	7
(New Zealand) Symes	4	7	3	2
(Hong Kong) McMahon	7	7	4	7
8	(England) Bryant	2	5	7	6
(England) Evans	7	7	7
16	(Northern Ireland) Baker	5	6	2
3	(Australia) Schuback	7	7	6	7
14	(Scotland) Muir	4	5	7	0
6	(Scotland) Wood	7	4	7	7
11	(England) Richards	2	7	3	1
2	(England) Allcock	7	7	7
15	(England) Thomson	3	1	1
7	(England) Smith	7	7	7
10	(Northern Ireland) Corkill	4	4	1

Quarter-finals
13	(Scotland) Corsie	7	7	7
(Australia) Parrella	1	0	4
(Hong Kong) McMahon	7	7	7
(England) Evans	0	6	6
3	(Australia) Schuback	7	0	7	7
6	(Scotland) Wood	5	7	3	1
2	(England) Allcock	7	7	7
7	(England) Smith	6	5	0

Semi-finals
13	(Scotland) Corsie	7	7	7
(Hong Kong) McMahon	2	4	5
Final
13	(Scotland) Corsie	6	7	7	7
3	(Australia) Schuback	7	2	6	5
3	(Australia) Schuback	7	7	0	0	7
2	(England) Allcock	3	4	7	7	1

=== Men's Pairs ===
First round

Quarter-finals

Semi-finals

Final

1
(England) David Bryant

(England) Tony Allcock

7
7
7

(Wales) John Bonatti

(Wales) Derek Forrester

6
1
3

1
(England) Bryant

(England) Allcock

7
7
7

8
(Northern Ireland) Alan McMullan

(Northern Ireland) David Corkill

6
4
7
7
7

8
(Northern Ireland) McMullan

(Northern Ireland) Corkill

4
1
2

(Wales) Carl Lewis

(Wales) John Downey

7
7
1
0
2

1
(England) Bryant

(England) Allcock

7
7
7

4
(Wales) Stephen Rees

(Wales) John Price

7
7
3
1
7

4
(Wales) Rees

(Wales) Price

2
5
3

(New Zealand) Brian Baldwin

(Hong Kong) Mark McMahon

4
5
7
7
6

4
(Wales) Rees

(Wales) Price

7
6
7
7

(England) T Scott

(England) David Webb

3
7
7
1
5

5
(New Zealand) Brassey

(New Zealand) Symes

7
7
0
5

5
(New Zealand) Rowan Brassey

(New Zealand) Maurice Symes

7
5
0
7
7

1
(England) Bryant

(England) Allcock

2
7
4
7
7

6
(Scotland) Willie Wood

(Scotland) Richard Corsie

5
7
7
7

6
(Scotland) Wood

(Scotland) Corsie

7
6
7
4
5

(Northern Ireland) Jim Baker

(Northern Ireland) Marcus Craig

7
6
6
5

6
(Scotland) Wood

(Scotland) Corsie

1
3
7
7
7

(Canada) Ronnie Jones

(Canada) Alf Wallace

2
5
5

3
(England) Smith

(England) Thomson

7
7
5
5
1

3
(England) Gary Smith

(England) Andy Thomson

7
7
7

6
(Scotland) Wood

(Scotland) Corsie

7
7
7

(Guernsey) Adrian Welch

(Scotland) Neil McGhee

4
1
1

2
(Australia) Schuback

(Australia) Morris

6
4
3

2
(Australia) Ian Schuback

(Australia) Trevor Morris

7
7
7

2
(Australia) Schuback

(Australia) Morris

7
7
7

(Scotland) Stephen Rankin

(Scotland) Hugh Duff

7
7
0
7

(Scotland) Rankin

(Scotland) Duff

0
3
2

7
(Australia) Rob Parrella

(Australia) Rex Johnston

5
4
7
4

== Women's singles ==
=== Group stages ===
Group A
Player 1	Player 2	Score
Mulholland	Bougourd	7-3 2-7 7-5
Ackland	Mulholland	7-0 7-0
Ackland	Bougourd	5-7 7-6 7-4

Group B
Player 1	Player 2	Score
Price	Simon	7-2 3-7 7-0
Letham	Simon	7-6 7-5
Letham	Price	7-6 3-7 7-0

Pos	Player	P	W
1	(Wales) Janet Ackland	2	2
2	(Republic of Ireland) Joyce Mulholland	2	1
3	(Guernsey) Fleur Bougourd	2	0

Pos	Player	P	W
1	(Scotland) Margaret Letham	2	2
2	(England) Mary Price	2	1
3	(Jersey) Ann Simon	2	0

Group C
Player 1	Player 2	Score
Jones	Vigor	4-7 7-2 7-2
Lindores	Jones	7-4 7-5
Vigor	Lindores	7-6 7-1

Group D
Player 1	Player 2	Score
Nicolle	Froud	7-2 7-5
Nicolle	Johnston	7-5 7-3
Johnston	Froud	7-5 7-3

Pos	Player	P	W
1	(England) Eileen Vigor	2	2
2	(Scotland) Joyce Lindores	2	1
3	(Wales) Rita Jones	2	0

Pos	Player	P	W
1	(Guernsey) Jenny Nicolle	2	2
2	(Northern Ireland) Margaret Johnston	2	1
3	(Wales) Sylvia Froud	2	0

=== Knockout ===
Quarter-finals
(England) Mary Price	7	7	7
(Wales) Janet Ackland	6	0	2
(Scotland) Margaret Letham	7	7	7
(Republic of Ireland) Joyce Mulholland	0	2	0
(Northern Ireland) Margaret Johnston	4	7	7	7
(England) Eileen Vigor	7	5	3	5
(Guernsey) Jenny Nicolle	7	7	5	0	1
(Scotland) Joyce Lindores	0	2	7	7	1

Semi-finals
(England) Price	7	4	3	7	7
(Scotland) Letham	2	7	7	4	6
(Northern Ireland) Johnston	7	1	7	3	7
(Guernsey) Nicolle	6	7	5	7	3

Final
(England) Price
(Northern Ireland) Johnston
