= 1990 World Indoor Bowls Championship =

Bowls championship held in Preston, Lancashire

World Indoor Championships 1990
- 12th World Indoor Bowls Championships
- Location: (England) Preston, Lancashire
- Date(s): 20 February - 04 March, 1990.
- Category: World Indoor Championships

The 1990 Embassy World Indoor Bowls Championship was held at Preston Guild Hall, Preston, England, from 20 February - 4 March 1990.

In the singles John Price won the title beating Ian Schuback in the final. In the pairs David Bryant and Tony Allcock secured their fourth world title.

The second Women's Indoor World Championship sponsored by Volkswagen took place at the Guernsey Bowling Club from April 21–22 and was won by Fleur Bougourd.

== Winners ==
Event	Winner
Men's Singles	(Wales) John Price
Women's Singles	(Guernsey) Fleur Bougourd
Men's Pairs	(England) Tony Allcock & (England) David Bryant

== Draw and results ==
=== Men's singles ===
First round
1	(Scotland) Richard Corsie	0	7	7	3	7
(Wales) Dai Wilkins	7	2	5	7	2
(England) Andy Thomson	7	7	7
(Northern Ireland) Maurice McKeown	4	3	5
(England) Gary Smith	7	2	2	7	7
(New Zealand) Clive Major	6	7	7	1	2
(Wales) Stephen Rees	7	7	7
(Guernsey) Nick Donaldson	2	4	0
(England) David Bryant	7	7	4	7
(Scotland) Robert McCulloch	4	6	7	2
(Australia) Ian Schuback	7	7	7
(Northern Ireland) Jim Baker	0	6	2
(New Zealand) Rowan Brassey	7	7	7
(Scotland) Neil McGhee	1	1	5
(Scotland) Willie Wood	7	7	7
(New Zealand) Peter Belliss	5	6	3
(Hong Kong) Mark McMahon	4	7	7	0	7
3	(Northern Ireland) David Corkill	7	1	5	7	2
(Israel) Cecil Bransky	5	3	7	7	7
16	(Wales) Bryan Kingdon	7	7	6	5	4
11	(Scotland) Jim Muir	7	7	0	7
(England) Pip Branfield	2	2	7	3
6	(Wales) John Price	7	1	7	7
(Australia) Stewart Davies	0	7	2	3
(Scotland) Hugh Duff	7	7	4	5	7
(Australia) Alex Matthews	5	5	7	7	0
(England) Wynne Richards	7	7	7
(Northern Ireland) Clifford Craig	3	2	6
15	(Scotland) Steven Rankin	5	7	7	6	7
(Australia) Jim Yates	7	2	0	7	5
2	(England) Tony Allcock	7	7	4	2	7
(Wales) Michael Kent	5	4	7	7	3

Second round
1	(Scotland) Corsie	5	0	7	6
(England) Thomson	7	7	4	7
(England) Smith	7	7	4	7
(Wales) Rees	4	3	7	2
(England) Bryant	7	4	2	1
(Australia) Schuback	3	7	7	7
(Scotland) Wood	5	7	7	7
(New Zealand) Brassey	7	5	3	3
(Hong Kong) McMahon	7	4	7	7
(Israel) Bransky	5	7	2	0
11	(Scotland) Muir	0	0	1
6	(Wales) Price	7	7	7
(Scotland) Duff	7	7	7
(England) Richards	2	4	4
15	(Scotland) Rankin	3	4	1
2	(England) Allcock	7	7	7

Quarter-finals
(England) Thomson	7	3	7	2	6
(England) Smith	2	7	2	7	7
(Australia) Schuback	7	2	7	7
(Scotland) Wood	3	7	0	4
(Hong Kong) McMahon	7	3	6	7	2
6	(Wales) Price	2	7	7	0	7
(Scotland) Duff	5	1	1
2	(England) Allcock	7	7	7

Semi-finals
(England) Smith	5	7	5	0
(Australia) Schuback	7	4	7	7
Final
(Australia) Schuback	7	4	2	7	2
6	(Wales) Price	4	7	7	3	7
6	(Wales) Price	7	4	7	3	7
2	(England) Allcock	6	7	1	7	2

=== Men's Pairs ===
First round

Quarter-finals

Semi-finals

Final

(England) David Bryant

(England) Tony Allcock

7
7
6
6
7

(Wales) Rod McHugh

(Wales) Walton Jones

0
3
7
7
6

(England) Bryant

(England) Allcock

7
3
7
6
7

(Northern Ireland) Mike Dunlop

(Northern Ireland) Jim Baker

7
7
7

(Northern Ireland) Dunlop

(Northern Ireland) Baker

3
7
6
7
2

(Northern Ireland) Barry Dunlop

(Northern Ireland) Stan Espie

5
3
1

(England) Bryant

(England) Allcock

7
7
4
7

(Wales) Stephen Rees

(Wales) John Price

7
7
6
7

(Wales) Rees

(Wales) Price

6
3
7
5

(Israel) Cecil Bransky

(Hong Kong) Mark McMahon

6
6
7
5

(Wales) Rees

(Wales) Price

5
6
7
7
7

(England) Gary Smith

(England) Andy Thomson

7
7
4
7

(England) Smith

(England) Thomson

7
7
0
3
4

(Guernsey) Nick Donaldson

(New Zealand) Clive Major

1
3
7
0

(England) Bryant

(England) Allcock

3
7
3
7
7

(Australia) Ian Schuback

(Australia) Jim Yates

7
1
7
3
7

(Australia) Schuback

(Australia) Yates

7
4
7
3
2

(Wales) Jim Hoskins

(Wales) Clive Jenkins

1
7
4
7
3

(Australia) Schuback

(Australia) Yates

3
7
7
7

(Scotland) Adam Robertson

(Scotland) Graham Robertson

7
7
7

(Scotland) Robertson

(Scotland) Robertson

7
5
3
5

(Scotland) Richard Corsie

(Scotland) Hugh Duff

5
2
4

(Australia) Schuback

(Australia) Yates

6
7
7
7

(England) Gerry Smyth

(England) Steve Halmai

7
7
7

(England) Smyth

(England) Halmai

7
5
1
1

(Australia) Stewart Davies

(Australia) Alex Matthews

1
1
5

(England) Smyth

(England) Halmai

7
7
1
7

2
(New Zealand) Peter Belliss

(New Zealand) Rowan Brassey

7
7
7

2
(New Zealand) Brassey

(New Zealand) Belliss

4
4
7
2

(England) Martin Tomlin

(England) Mick Tomlin

2
4
2

=== Women's singles ===
Group A
Player 1	Player 2	Score
Sutherland	McKeag	5-7, 7–2, 7–1
Bougourd	Sutherland	7-4, 7–2
Bougourd	McKeag	7-2, 7–0

Group B
Player 1	Player 2	Score
Wren	Smith	7–0, 7–2
Wren	Johnston	7-6, 7–2
Johnston	Smith	7–4, 7–3

Pos	Player	P	W
1	(Guernsey) Fleur Bougourd	2	2
2	(Scotland) Ann Sutherland	2	1
3	(Republic of Ireland) Belle McKeag	2	0

Pos	Player	P	W
1	(Scotland) Liz Wren	2	2
2	(Northern Ireland) Margaret Johnston	2	1
3	(England) Gill Smith	2	0

Group C
Player 1	Player 2	Score
Conlan	John	7-2, 7–4
Conlan	Froud	7-6, 7–5
Froud	John	7-5, 7–1

Group D
Player 1	Player 2	Score
Steele	Gordon	5–7, 7–2, 7–1
Steele	Simon	7–6, 5–7, 7–6
Gordon	Simon	7-2 7–4

Pos	Player	P	W
1	(Scotland) Jeanette Conlan	2	2
2	(Wales) Sylvia Froud	2	1
3	(Wales) Pam John	2	0

Pos	Player	P	W
1	(England) Mavis Steele	2	2
2	(Northern Ireland) Ellen Gordon	2	1
3	(Guernsey) Ann Simon	2	0

Quarter-finals
(Guernsey) Fleur Bougourd	7	7	3	7
(Northern Ireland) Margaret Johnston	1	6	7	6
(Scotland) Jeanette Conlan	7	7	7
(Northern Ireland) Ellen Gordon	2	1	3
(Scotland) Liz Wren	5	7	1	7	7
(Wales) Ann Sutherland	7	4	7	2	4
(England) Mavis Steele	7	2	7	7
(Wales) Sylvia Froud	3	7	6	6

Semi-finals
(Guernsey) Bougourd	3	7	3	7	7
(Scotland) Conlan	7	1	7	2	1
(Scotland) Wren	7	1	0	7	7
(England) Steele	5	7	7	6	6

Final
(Guernsey) Bougourd	6	7	7	4	7
(Scotland) Wren	7	6	5	7	2
