= 1999 World Indoor Bowls Championship =

World Indoor Championships 1999
- 21st World Indoor Bowls Championships
- Location: (England) Great Yarmouth, Norfolk
- Date: 16–25 January 1999.
- Category: World Indoor Championships

The 1999 Potters Holidays World World Indoor Bowls Championship was held at Potters Leisure Resort, Hopton on Sea, Great Yarmouth, England, from 16 to 25 January 1999.
In the singles the unseeded Alex Marshall won his first title beating David Gourlay in the final.
In the pairs John Price & Stephen Rees beat defending champions Richard Corsie & Graham Robertson in the final.

The women's singles competition took place in Prestwick from April 14–16. The event was won by Caroline McAllister.

== Winners ==
Event	Winner
Men's Singles	(Scotland) Alex Marshall
Women's Singles	(Scotland) Caroline McAllister
Men's Pairs	(Wales) John Price & (Wales) Stephen Rees

== Draw and results ==
=== Men's singles ===
First round
1	(Scotland) Paul Foster	3
(Northern Ireland) David Corkill	1
16	(England) Gary Smith	2
(England) David Holt	3
8	(England) Wynne Richards	2
(Wales) Jason Greenslade	3
9	(Scotland) Graham Robertson	2
(Wales) Robert Weale	3
4	(England) Mervyn King	1
(Scotland) Alex Marshall	3
13	(England) Greg Harlow	0
(England) Ian Bond	3
5	(Wales) John Price	3
(Scotland) Sandy Syme	0
12	(Australia) Mark McMahon	3
(Australia) Steve Anderson	0
3	(England) Andy Thomson	0
(Northern Ireland) Jonathan Ross	3
14	(Australia) Ian Schuback	2
(Australia) Ian Taylor	3
6	(Scotland) David Gourlay	3
(England) Billy Jackson	2
11	(Scotland) Richard Corsie	2
(Hong Kong) Noel Kennedy	3
2	(Scotland) Hugh Duff	1
(Northern Ireland) Jeremy Henry	3
15	(England) Les Gillett	3
(Australia) Steve Glasson	1
7	(Wales) Stephen Rees	3
(Northern Ireland) Neil Booth	2
10	(New Zealand) Rowan Brassey	1
(England) Robert Newman	3

Second round
1	(Scotland) Foster	0
(England) Holt	3
(Wales) Greenslade	1
(Wales) Weale	3
(Scotland) Marshall	3
(England) Bond	1
5	(Wales) Price	2
12	(Australia) McMahon	3
(Northern Ireland) Ross	3
(Australia) Taylor	1
6	(Scotland) Gourlay	3
(Hong Kong) Kennedy	0
(Northern Ireland) Henry	3
15	(England) Gillett	2
7	(Wales) Rees	3
(England) Newman	1

Quarter-finals
(England) Holt	3
(Wales) Weale	1
(Scotland) Marshall	3
12	(Australia) McMahon	2
(Northern Ireland) Ross	2
6	(Scotland) Gourlay	3
(Northern Ireland) Henry	1
7	(Wales) Rees	3

Semi-finals
(England) Holt	2
(Scotland) Marshall	3
Final
(Scotland) Marshall	7	7	7
6	(Scotland) Gourlay	6	2	0
6	(Scotland) Gourlay	3
7	(Wales) Rees	1

=== Men's Pairs ===
First round

Quarter-finals

Semi-finals

Final

1
(Scotland) Richard Corsie

(Scotland) Graham Robertson

3

(Northern Ireland) Peter Black

(Northern Ireland) Nigel Gibson

0

1
(Scotland) Corsie

(Scotland) Robertson

3

8
(New Zealand) Rowan Brassey

(Australia) Steve Glasson

2

(Australia) Schuback

(Australia) Taylor

2

(Australia) Ian Schuback

(Australia) Ian Taylor

3

1
(Scotland) Corsie

(Scotland) Robertson

3

4
(Australia) Mark McMahon

(Scotland) David Gourlay

3

5
(England) Thomson

(England) Smith

2

(England) Les Gillett

(England) Robert Newman

1

4
(Australia) McMahon

(Scotland) Gourlay

0

5
(England) Andy Thomson

(England) Gary Smith

3

(England) Smith

(England) Thomson

3

8
(Wales) Graham Dennis

(Wales) Martyn Roberts

0

1
(Scotland) Corsie

(Scotland) Robertson

6
7
7
1
3

2
(Wales) John Price

(Wales) Stephen Rees

3

2
(Wales) Price

(Wales) Rees

7
5
3
7
7

(England) Alan Springell

(England) Gary Grace

0

2
(Wales) Price

(Wales) Rees

3

7
(England) Mervyn King

(England) Tony Allcock

3

7
(England) King

(England) Allcock

1

(Scotland) Gavin Campbell

(Scotland) Graeme Campbell

2

2
(Wales) Price

(Wales) Rees

3

3
(Scotland) Hugh Duff

(Scotland) Paul Foster

1

6
(England) Richards

(England) Harlow

0

(Wales) Jason Greenslade

(Wales) Robert Weale

3

(Wales) Greenslade

(Wales) Weale

2

6
(England) Wynne Richards

(England) Greg Harlow

3

6
(England) Richards

(England) Harlow

3

(Northern Ireland) Neil Booth

(South Africa) Neil Burkett

0

=== Women's singles ===
Quarter-finals
(Scotland) Caroline McAllister	5	7	7	7
(Wales) Mair Jones	7	0	3	3
(Guernsey) Anne Simon	7	1	7	7
(Scotland) Margaret Letham	2	7	3	5
(Scotland) Kate Adams	1	7	7	7
(Republic of Ireland) Audrey Doggart	7	0	3	0
(Guernsey) Alison Merrien	4	7	7	7
(New Zealand) Marlene Castle	7	6	0	6

Semi-finals
(Scotland) McAllister	6	7	1	7	7
(Guernsey) Simon	7	0	7	5	5
(Scotland) Adams	7	1	7	7
(Guernsey) Merrien	6	7	4	5

Final
(Scotland) McAllister	6	7	5	7	7
(Scotland) Adams	7	1	7	0	2
