= 1998 World Indoor Bowls Championship =

World Indoor Championships 1998
- 20th World Indoor Bowls Championships
- Location: (England) Preston, Lancashire
- Date: 13–23 January 1998.
- Category: World Indoor Championships

The 1998 SAGA World World Indoor Bowls Championship was held at Preston Guild Hall, Preston, England, from 13 to 23 January 1998.
In the Singles the unseeded Paul Foster, a 100-1 outsider won his first title beating Mervyn King in the final.
In the Pairs Richard Corsie and Graham Robertson won defeating Andy Thomson and Gary Smith in the final.

The Women's World Championship took place at the Selwyn Samuel Centre in Llanelli from April 22–28. The event was won by Caroline McAllister.

== Winners ==
Event	Winner
Men's Singles	(Scotland) Paul Foster
Women's Singles	(Scotland) Caroline McAllister
Men's Pairs	(Scotland) Richard Corsie & (Scotland) Graham Robertson

== Draw and results ==
=== Men's singles ===
First round
1	(Scotland) Hugh Duff	2
(England) Les Gillett	3
16	(Australia) Ian Taylor	0
(Scotland) Paul Foster	3
8	(Australia) Ian Schuback	1
(Wales) Jason Greenslade	3
9	(Australia) Mark McMahon	2
(Hong Kong) Noel Kennedy	3
4	(Scotland) Richard Corsie	1
(England) Robert Newman	3
13	(England) Greg Harlow	3
(Northern Ireland) Gary McCloy	0
5	(England) Tony Allcock	1
(Northern Ireland) Neil Booth	3
12	(Wales) John Price	3
(Scotland) Robert Marshall	2
3	(England) Mervyn King	3
(Australia) Steve Glasson	2
14	(England) Gary Smith	3
(Jersey) Lee Nixon	2
6	(Scotland) David Gourlay	2
(England) Billy Jackson	3
11	(New Zealand) Rowan Brassey	3
(Canada) George Whitelaw	2
2	(England) Andy Thomson	1
(Wales) Robert Weale	3
15	(Scotland) Graham Robertson	3
(Guernsey) Adrian Welch	1
7	(England) Wynne Richards	3
(New Zealand) Mike Galloway	1
10	(Wales) Stephen Rees	3
(Republic of Ireland) Jeremy Henry	1

Second round
(England) Gillett	0
(Scotland) Foster	3
(Wales) Greenslade	3
(Hong Kong) Kennedy	0
(England) Newman	3
13	(England) Harlow	2
(Northern Ireland) Booth	1
12	(Wales) Price	3
3	(England) King	3
14	(England) Smith	0
(England) Jackson	3
11	(New Zealand) Brassey	1
(Wales) Weale	1
15	(Scotland) Robertson	3
7	(England) Richards	0
10	(Wales) Rees	3

Quarter-finals
(Scotland) Foster	3
(Wales) Greenslade	2
(England) Newman	0
12	(Wales) Price	3
3	(England) King	3
(England) Jackson	2
15	(Scotland) Robertson	1
10	(Wales) Rees	3

Semi-finals
(Scotland) Foster	3
12	(Wales) Price	1
Final
(Scotland) Foster	7	5	7	7
3	(England) King	1	7	5	4
3	(England) King	3
10	(Wales) Rees	2

=== Men's Pairs ===
First round

Quarter-finals

Semi-finals

Final

1
(England) Mervyn King

(England) Tony Allcock

3

(Wales) Jason Greenslade

(Wales) David Harding

2

1
(England) King

(England) Allcock

7
4
7
6
5

8
(Australia) Mark McMahon

(Australia) Steve Glasson

3

8
(Australia) McMahon

(Australia) Glasson

6
7
1
7
7

(England) Alan Springell

(England) Gary Grace

0

8
(Australia) McMahon

(Australia) Glasson

2

4
(Scotland) Richard Corsie

(Scotland) Graham Robertson

3

4
(Scotland) Corsie

(Scotland) Robertson

3

(Northern Ireland) Jeremy Henry

(Northern Ireland) Neil Booth

2

4
(Scotland) Corsie

(Scotland) Robertson

7
7
7

5
(England) Wynne Richards

(England) Greg Harlow

1

(Northern Ireland) Hogg

(Northern Ireland) McCloy

1
1
4

8
(Northern Ireland) Gary McCloy

(Northern Ireland) Colin Hogg

3

4
(Scotland) Corsie

(Scotland) Robertson

7
4
6
7
7

2
(England) Andy Thomson

(England) Gary Smith

3

2
(England) Thomson

(England) Smith

4
7
7
1
0

(Hong Kong) Noel Kennedy

(Canada) George Whitelaw

2

2
(England) Thomson

(England) Smith

7
7
7

7
(Australia) Ian Schuback

(Australia) Ian Taylor

3

7
(Australia) Schuback

(Australia) Taylor

2
2
5

(Jersey) Lee Nixon

(Guernsey) Adrian Welch

1

2
(England) Thomson

(England) Smith

3

3
(Wales) John Price

(Wales) Stephen Rees

3

3
(Wales) Price

(Wales) Rees

2

(New Zealand) Rowan Brassey

(New Zealand) Mike Galloway

0

3
(Wales) Price

(Wales) Rees

7
5
7
7

6
(Scotland) Hugh Duff

(Scotland) David Gourlay

3

6
(Scotland) Duff

(Scotland) Gourlay

4
7
4
1

(Scotland) Alex Marshall

(Scotland) Alex Ross

1

=== Women's singles ===
==== Group stages ====
Group A
Player 1	Player 2	Score
Shaw	Le Long	7-3 7–1
Davies	Johnston	7-3 7–3
Shaw	Davies	7-0 7–3
Le Long	Johnston	7-1 7–3
Le Long	Davies	2–0
Shaw	Johnston	

Group B
Player 1	Player 2	Score
Horman	Khan	4-7 7-5 7–4
McAllister	Mulholland	7-4 7–3
Horman	McAllister	
Khan	Mulholland	
Khan	Horman	
Mulholland	McAllister	

Pos	Player	P	W
1	(England) Norma Shaw	3	
2	(Guernsey) Lindsey Le Long	3	
3	(Northern Ireland) Margaret Johnston	3	
4	(Wales) Julie Davies	3	

Pos	Player	P	W
1	(Scotland) Caroline McAllister	3	
2	(Jersey) Karina Horman	3	
3	(Republic of Ireland) Joyce Mulholland	3	
3	(New Zealand) Millie Khan	3	

Group C
Player 1	Player 2	Score
Ashby	MacNaughton	7-3 1-7 7–6
Adams	Nicolle	7-2 7–6
Ashby	Adams	
Nicolle	MacNaughton	
MacNaughton	Adams	
Ashby	Nicolle	

Group D
Player 1	Player 2	Score
Shorter	Simon	7-1 7–5
Tanner	Smith	7-5 7–4
Tanner	Shorter	
Smith	Simon	
Tanner	Simon	
Smith	Shorter	

Pos	Player	P	W
1	(England) Carol Ashby	3	
2	(Scotland) Kate Adams	3	
3	(Guernsey) Jenny Nicolle	3	
4	(Canada) Jan MacNaughton	3	

Pos	Player	P	W
1	(Wales) Maureen Tanner	3	
2	(Hong Kong) Linda Smith	3	
3	(England) Liz Shorter	3	
3	(Guernsey) Ann Simon	3	

Quarter-finals
(Scotland) Caroline McAllister	5	7	1	7	7
(Scotland) Kate Adams	7	5	7	4	6
(England) Norma Shaw	5	7	7	7
(Hong Kong) Linda Smith	7	2	3	4
(England) Carol Ashby	7	2	7	7
(Jersey) Lindsey Le Long	3	7	3	4
(Wales) Maureen Tanner

Semi-finals
(Scotland) McAllister	7	7	5	7
(England) Shaw	2	1	7	2
(England) Ashby	7	7	7
(Wales) Tanner	1	4	4

Final
(Scotland) McAllister	7	2	7	7
(England) Ashby	3	7	5	3
