= 1989 World Indoor Bowls Championship =

Bowls championship held in Preston, Lancashire

World Indoor Championships 1989
- 11th World Indoor Bowls Championships
- Location: (England) Preston, Lancashire
- Date: 1-12 March 1989
- Category: World Indoor Championships

The 1989 Embassy World Indoor Bowls Championship was held at Preston Guild Hall, Preston, England, from 1 to 12 March 1989. The event moved to the Preston Guild Hall from Alexandra Palace. Richard Corsie won the title beating Willie Wood in the final.

In the Pairs final David Bryant and Tony Allcock secured their third world title. The Pairs Championship was held alongside the Singles for the first time. There was no Women's event.

== Winners ==
Event	Winner
Men's Singles	(Scotland) Richard Corsie
Men's Pairs	(England) Tony Allcock & (England) David Bryant

== Draw and results ==
=== Men's singles ===
First round
14	(Scotland) Richard Corsie	4	7	6	7	7
(New Zealand) Rowan Brassey	7	4	7	0	4
(New Zealand) Ivan Botica	1	1	7	7	7
3	(England) David Bryant	7	7	6	2	6
6	(Hong Kong) Mark McMahon	7	7	7
(England) Noel Burrows	1	5	5
(England) Brett Morley	3	7	7	7
(Northern Ireland) Jim Baker	7	0	5	4
(England) Gary Smith	7	7	7
15	(Scotland) Colin Sommerville	4	1	6
2	(England) Tony Allcock	7	7	7
(Australia) Denis Dalton	5	2	0
7	(Wales) John Price	5	7	7	7
(Zimbabwe) Garin Beare	7	4	4	4
10	(Scotland) Jim Muir	7	7	4	7
(Northern Ireland) Alan McMullan	4	2	7	4
5	(Scotland) Willie Wood	5	7	0	7	7
(Australia) Jim Yates	7	4	7	6	1
12	(Scotland) John Watson	7	7	7
(Australia) Bill Kidd	2	0	5
13	(England) Wynne Richards	7	7	7
(Guernsey) Gary Pitschou	1	4	0
4	(Northern Ireland) David Corkill	7	7	7
(Wales) Michael Kent	6	0	0
1	(Scotland) Hugh Duff	7	7	7
(Northern Ireland) Cliff Craig	1	1	1
(England) John Rednall	7	7	7
(New Zealand) Peter Belliss	4	5	1
8	(Wales) Stephen Rees	6	7	6	7	7
(Wales) Bryan Kingdon	7	5	7	6	2
(Australia) Ian Schuback	7	5	7	0	7
(England) Roy Cutts	6	7	3	7	5

Second round
14	(Scotland) Corsie	5	2	7	7	7
(New Zealand) Botica	7	7	3	2	1
6	(Hong Kong) McMahon	2	7	7	7
(England) Morley	7	4	3	?
(England) Smith	7	7	7
2	(England) Allcock	2	5	5
7	(Wales) Price	7	7	7
10	(Scotland) Muir	6	2	4
5	(Scotland) Wood	5	7	2	7	7
12	(Scotland) Watson	7	5	7	1	3
13	(England) Richards	7	7	7
4	(Northern Ireland) Corkill	1	5	0
1	(Scotland) Duff	7	6	7	5	7
(England) Rednall	1	7	4	7	2
8	(Wales) Rees	7	7	7
(Australia) Schuback	1	5	2

Quarter-finals
14	(Scotland) Corsie	7	6	7	7
6	(Hong Kong) McMahon	1	7	6	0
(England) Smith	7	7	7
7	(Wales) Price	1	2	5
5	(Scotland) Wood	7	7	7
13	(England) Richards	6	6	5
1	(Scotland) Duff	7	7	2	7
8	(Wales) Rees	6	1	7	2

Semi-finals
14	(Scotland) Corsie	7	7	7
(England) Smith	1	5	5
Final
14	(Scotland) Corsie	7	7	7	7	7
5	(Scotland) Wood	2	5	6	3	0
5	(Scotland) Wood	6	7	7	4	7
1	(Scotland) Duff	7	5	1	7	1

=== Men's Pairs ===
First round

Quarter-finals

Semi-finals

Final

2
(England) David Bryant

(England) Tony Allcock

7
9
9

(Republic of Ireland) Wilf Moore

(Republic of Ireland) Bob Nichol

6
4
0

2
(England) Bryant

(England) Allcock

7
7
6
7

(Scotland) Jim Muir

(Scotland) Angus Blair

9
7
8

(Scotland) Muir

(Scotland) Blair

6
4
7
5

(Guernsey) Gary Pitschou

(Zimbabwe) Garin Beare

8
6
3

2
(England) Bryant

(England) Allcock

6
9
6

3
(England) Andy Thomson

(England) Gary Smith

13
7
9

3
(England) Thomson

(England) Smith

1
2
5

(Wales) Peter Collins

(Wales) Michael Collins

0
4
3

3
(England) Thomson

(England) Smith

1
8
9
4
6

(Northern Ireland) Jim Baker

(Northern Ireland) David Corkill

7
9
4
1
7

(Northern Ireland) Corkill

(Northern Ireland) Baker

6
1
0
5
5

(New Zealand) Ivan Botica

(Hong Kong) Mark McMahon

1
0
6
7
4

2
(England) Bryant

(England) Allcock

9
8
9

4
(New Zealand) Rowan Brassey

(New Zealand) Peter Belliss

8
7
10

4
(Australia) Brassey

(Australia) Belliss

5
2
3

(Australia) Bill Kidd

(Australia) Denis Dalton

6
6
4

4
(New Zealand) Brassey

(New Zealand) Belliss

6
5
1
7

(Wales) Stephen Rees

(Wales) John Price

4
8
7
11

(Wales) Price

(Wales) Rees

5
4
10
6

(Scotland) Gary Bennett

(Scotland) Ken Milne

8
3
1
2

4
(New Zealand) Brassey

(New Zealand) Belliss

8
5
6
5

(England) Gerry Smyth

(England) Steve Halmai

7
5
8

(England) Smyth

(England) Halmai

3
6
1
3

(Wales) Rod McHugh

(Wales) Walton Jones

2
4
2

(England) Smyth

(England) Halmai

8
5
8
7

(England) Roy Cutts

(England) Wynne Richards

8
6
9

(England) Cutts

(England) Richards

4
7
6
5

1
(Australia) Ian Schuback

(Australia) Jim Yates

7
5
1
