= 1993 World Indoor Bowls Championship =

World Indoor Championships 1993
- 15th World Indoor Bowls Championships
- Location: (England) Preston, Lancashire
- Date: 15–27 February 1993.
- Category: World Indoor Championships

The 1993 Midland Bank World Indoor Bowls Championship was held at Preston Guild Hall, Preston, England, from 15–27 February 1993. Richard Corsie won his third title beating Jim McCann in the final.
The Pairs title went to Gary Smith & Andy Thomson.

The Women's World Indoor Championship was held in Guernsey during April with the final being held on 18 April. the winner was Kate Adams.

== Winners ==
Event	Winner
Men's Singles	(Scotland) Richard Corsie
Women's Singles	(Scotland) Kate Adams
Men's Pairs	(England) Gary Smith & (England) Andy Thomson

== Men's singles ==
First round
1	(Australia) Ian Schuback	2
(Guernsey) Mike Nicolle	3
16	(England) Mervyn King	3
(Canada) Bill Boettger	1
8	(Scotland) Richard Corsie	3
(South Africa) Bill Moseley	0
9	(Wales) Stephen Rees	1
(Scotland) David Gourlay	3
4	(Wales) John Price	3
(Northern Ireland) Noel Graham	0
13	(Australia) Rob Parrella	3
(Northern Ireland) Ian McClure	2
5	(England) Gary Smith	3
(Scotland) Ian Hunter	1
12	(Israel) Jeff Rabkin	3
(Wales) Phil Rowlands	1
3	(England) Tony Allcock	3
(Jersey) David Le Marquand	0
14	(Scotland) Jim Muir	3
(New Zealand) Gary Lawson	0
6	(England) David Bryant	2
(Australia) Dennis Katunarich	3
11	(Scotland) Hugh Duff	3
(Wales) Terry Sullivan	3
2	(England) Andy Thomson	0
(Australia) Cameron Curtis	3
15	(Scotland) Jim McCann	3
(New Zealand) Robin Jefferson	2
7	(Scotland) Graham Robertson	3
(New Zealand) Peter Belliss	0
10	(Scotland) Willie Wood	2
(England) Mel Biggs	3

Second round
(Guernsey) Nicolle	1
16	(England) King	3
8	(Scotland) Corsie	3
(Scotland) Gourlay	0
4	(Wales) Price	3
13	(Australia) Parella	1
5	(England) Smith	3
12	(Israel) Rabkin	0
3	(England) Allcock	1
14	(Scotland) Muir	0
(Australia) Katunarich	3
11	(Scotland) Duff	2
(Australia) Curtis	2
15	(Scotland) McCann	3
7	(Scotland) Robertson	3
(England) Biggs	1

Quarter-finals
16	(England) King	2
8	(Scotland) Corsie	3
4	(Wales) Price	2
5	(England) Smith	3
3	(England) Allcock	3
(Australia) Katunarich	2
15	(Scotland) McCann	3
7	(Scotland) Robertson	2

Semi-finals
8	(Scotland) Corsie	7	7	7
5	(England) Smith	3	3	2
Final
8	(Scotland) Corsie	7	7	4	7
15	(Scotland) McCann	4	5	7	5
3	(England) Allcock	4	4	1
15	(Scotland) McCann	7	7	7

== Men's Pairs ==
First round

Quarter-finals

Semi-finals

Final

1
(England) David Bryant

(England) Tony Allcock

3

(Wales) Jonathan Forey

(Wales) John Glover

0

1
(England) Bryant

(England) Allcock

3

(South Africa) Bill Moseley

(Israel) Jeff Rabkin

3

(South Africa) Moseley

(Israel) Rabkin

?

(Northern Ireland) Clifford Craig

(Northern Ireland) Rodney McCutcheon

1

1
(England) Bryant

(England) Allcock

7
1
7
3
7

(Australia) Cameron Curtis

(Australia) Ian Schuback

3

(Australia) Curtis

(Australia) Schuback

5
7
5
7
6

(England) Ted Boyle

(England) Ian Boyle

0

(Australia) Curtis

(Australia) Schuback

3

(New Zealand) Peter Belliss

(New Zealand) Gary Lawson

3

(New Zealand) Belliss

(New Zealand) Lawson

2

(Northern Ireland) Brian Craig

(Northern Ireland) Marcus Craig

0

1
(England) Bryant

(England) Allcock

6
3
6

2
(England) Gary Smith

(England) Andy Thomson

7
7
7

2
(England) Smith

(England) Thomson

7
7
7

(Wales) Colin Edwards

(Wales) Ieuan Evans

3
0
0

2
(England) Smith

(England) Thomson

3

(Scotland) Ian Campbell

(Scotland) Robert Grant

3

(Scotland) Campbell

(Scotland) Grant

0

(Australia) Dennis Katunarich

(Australia) Rob Parrella

1

2
(England) Smith

(England) Thomson

7
7
7

(Northern Ireland) Ian McClure

(Northern Ireland) Steve Adamson

3

(Northern Ireland) Adamson

(Northern Ireland) McClure

5
2
3

(Canada) Bill Boettger

(New Zealand) Robin Jefferson

1

(Northern Ireland) Adamson

(Northern Ireland) McClure

3

(Scotland) Richard Corsie

(Scotland) Graham Robertson

3

(Scotland) Corsie

(Scotland) Robertson

2

(Jersey) David Le Marquand

(Guernsey) Mike Nicolle

0

== Women's singles ==
=== Group stages ===
Group A
Player 1	Player 2	Score
Gourlay	Stead	1-7 7-0 7-5
Thomas	Wilkinson	7-6 4-7 7-1
Gourlay	Thomas	4-7 7-3 7-4
Wilkinson	Stead	4-7 7-4 7-0
Gourlay	Wilkinson	7-3 7-3
Stead	Thomas	7-2 7-1

Group B
Player 1	Player 2	Score
Adams	Castle	7-3 5-7 7-3
Roylance	Montgomerie	7-0 7-0
Montgomerie	Castle	1-7 7-1 7-5
Roylance	Adams	7- 2 5-7 7-3
Roylance	Castle	7-4 7-0
Adams	Montgomerie	7-5 6-7 7-5

Pos	Player	P	W
1	(Scotland) Sarah Gourlay	3	3
2	(Jersey) Val Stead	3	1
3	(Wales) B Thomas	3	1
4	(Republic of Ireland) Muriel Wilkinson	3	1

Pos	Player	P	W
1	(England) Jayne Roylance	3	3
2	(Scotland) Kate Adams	3	2
3	(Republic of Ireland) N Montgomerie	3	1
3	(New Zealand) Marlene Castle	3	0

Group C
Player 1	Player 2	Score
Roney	Mcintosh	7-4 6-7 7-1
le Feuvre	Hankin	2-7 7-1 7-6
le Feuvre	Roney	7-5 7-3
McIntosh	Hankin	7-0 7-1
Hankin	Roney	7-3 7-3
le Feuvre	McIntosh	4-7 7-2 7-4

Group D
Player 1	Player 2	Score
Nicolle	Price	7-4 7-5
Jones	le Marquand	7-2 7-4
Price	Jones	7-4 7-1
le Marquand	Nicolle	7-4 0-7 7-4
Price	le Marquand	7-3 7-4
Nicolle	Jones	7-5 6-7 7-0

Pos	Player	P	W
1	(Guernsey) Wilma le Feuvre	3	3
2	(Scotland) Caroline McIntosh	3	1
3	(Canada) Jean Roney	3	1
4	(England) Doreen Hankin	3	1

Pos	Player	P	W
1	(England) Mary Price	3	2
2	(Guernsey) Jenny Nicolle	3	2
3	(Jersey) Myrtle le Marquand	3	1
4	(Wales) Rita Jones	3	1

=== Knockout ===
Quarter-finals
(Scotland) Kate Adams	7	1	7	7
(Guernsey) Jenny Nicolle	3	7	1	6
(Guernsey) Wilma le Feuvre	7	4	7	7
(Jersey) Val Stead	1	7	5	5
(England) Mary Price	7	7	6	2	7
(Scotland) Sarah Gourlay	1	5	7	7	2
(England) Jayne Roylance	7	1	7	7
(Scotland) Catherine McIntosh	4	7	1	6

Semi-finals
(Scotland) Adams	7	7	7
(Guernsey) le Feuvre	6	6	3
(England) Roylance	0	7	7	1	7
(England) Price	7	5	2	7	1

Final
(Scotland) Adams	7	7	0	7
(England) Roylance	0	1	7	3
