= 1988 World Indoor Bowls Championship =

Bowls championship held in Alexandra Palace, & Bournemouth

World Indoor Championships 1988
- 10th World Indoor Bowls Championships
- Location: (England) Alexandra Palace, & Bournemouth
- Date(s): 5-13 March 1988 & 5-13 Dec 1987+.
- Category: World Indoor Championships

The 1988 Embassy World Indoor Bowls Championship was held at Alexandra Palace, London, England, from 5 to 13 March 1988. The event moved to the newly rebuilt Alexandra Palace from the Coatbridge indoor bowling club. Seeds were introduced for the first time.

Hugh Duff won the title beating Wynne Richards in the final five games to one (7-0, 7-1, 2-7, 7-6, 7-4, 7-4).

The 1988 Midland Bank World Indoor Pairs Championship was held at the Bournemouth International Centre from 5 to 13 December 1987+.(+ Held in Dec 1987 to avoid a clash with the 1988 World Outdoor Championships). Ian Schuback & Jim Yates won the title defeating Andy Thomson & Gary Smith 5-1 in the final (6-3, 7-5, 5-7, 8-2, 7-5, 7-5).

The 1988 Inaugural Women's Championship was held at the Llanelli Indoor Bowling Club from April 29 to 1 May 1. Margaret Johnston won the title beating Edna Bessell in the final 7-3 5-7 7-6 7-2.

== Winners ==
Event	Winner
Men's Singles	(Scotland) Hugh Duff
Men's Pairs	(Australia) Ian Schuback & (Australia) Jim Yates
Women's Singles	(Northern Ireland) Margaret Johnston

== Draw and results ==
=== Men's singles ===
First round
(Scotland) Hugh Duff	7	7	7
(Hong Kong) Noel Kennedy	1	0	2
3	(Northern Ireland) Jim Baker	7	7	7
(New Zealand) Danny O'Connor	0	3	3
6	(Scotland) Willie Wood	7	7	6	7
(Northern Ireland) Eric Sands	6	5	7	2
(Wales) John Price	7	7	7
(Australia) Stan Coomber	5	3	1
2	(England) David Bryant	7	7	7
(Fiji) Peter Fong	0	5	2
(Scotland) Neil McGhee	7	7	7
(New Zealand) Andy Seaton	2	1	3
(Scotland) Jim Muir	7	7	5	7
(England) Andy Thomson	4	5	7	6
(New Zealand) Phil Skoglund	5	7	7	7
(Wales) Jason Greenslade	7	3	4	0
(England) Wynne Richards	3	7	7	7
(Canada) Graham Jarvis	7	0	1	4
(Scotland) Robert McCulloch	7	6	7
4	(New Zealand) Peter Belliss	5	2	7
(Wales) Stephen Rees	7	5	7	7
(England) Gary Smith	1	7	4	6
(Scotland) Ian Bruce	2	4	7	7	7
5	(Northern Ireland) David Corkill	7	7	4	6	2
1	(England) Tony Allcock	7	7	7
(Wales) John E Thomas	0	2	1
(Scotland) Colin Somerville	6	7	7	7
(Jersey) David Le Marquand	7	5	2	5
(Australia) John Snell	4	6	7	7	7
(Northern Ireland) Mike Dunlop	7	7	3	2	5
(Israel) Cecil Bransky	7	7	2	6	7
(England) Nigel Smith	6	1	7	7	5

Second round
(Scotland) Duff	7	7	7
3	(Northern Ireland) Baker	3	5	4
6	(Scotland) Wood	2	7	7	3	7
(Wales) Price	7	1	3	7	4
2	(England) Bryant	6	1	7	7	7
(Scotland) McGhee	7	7	6	5	3
(Scotland) Muir	7	7	7
(New Zealand) Skoglund	0	5	5
(England) Richards	7	7	7
(Scotland) McCulloch	3	4	1
(Wales) Rees	7	4	7	4	7
(Scotland) Bruce	2	7	0	7	2
1	(England) Allcock	2	7	7	7
(Scotland) Somerville	7	5	0	3
(Australia) Snell	7	7	7
(Israel) Bransky	3	0	1

Quarter-finals
(Scotland) Duff	7	6	7	7
6	(Scotland) Wood	5	7	4	5
2	(England) Bryant	7	0	7	7
(Scotland) Muir	5	7	1	5
(England) Richards	7	2	3	7	7
(Wales) Rees	4	7	7	5	6
1	(England) Allcock	7	7	7
(Australia) Snell	3	4	4

Semi-finals
(Scotland) Duff	7	7	7
2	(England) Bryant	4	6	4
Final
(Scotland) Duff	5 sets
(England) Richards	1 sets
(England) Richards	7	7	4	4	7
1	(England) Allcock	6	5	7	7	4

=== Men's Pairs ===
First round

Quarter-finals

Semi-finals

Final

(England) David Bryant

(England) Tony Allcock

6
3
7
9

(Northern Ireland) Stan Espie

(Northern Ireland) Sammy Allen

4
8
4
3

(England) Bryant

(England) Allcock

8
5
1
8

(Fiji) Peter Fong

(Israel) Cecil Bransky

7
0
10
4
6

(Fiji) Fong

(Israel) Bransky

2
3
8
3

(Wales) Carl Lewis

(Wales) Clive Taylor

4
9
0
8
1

(England) Bryant

(England) Allcock

4
4
6
7

(England) Andy Thomson

(England) Gary Smith

2
6
6
7
6

(England) Thomson

(England) Smith

5
7
4
9

(Scotland) Hugh Duff

(Scotland) Willie Wood

7
8
5
2
5

(England) Thomson

(England) Smith

9
5
3
6
7

(Northern Ireland) Alan McMullan

(Northern Ireland) David Corkill

8
8
10

(Northern Ireland) McMullan

(Northern Ireland) Corkill

1
7
7
3
6

(Jersey) John Jones

(Guernsey) Mike Nicolle

2
2
1

(England) Thomson

(England) Smith

1 sets

(Australia) Ian Schuback

(Australia) Jim Yates

7
5
6

(Australia) Schuback

(Australia) Yates

5 sets

(England) Gerry Smyth

(England) Steve Halmai

5
3
5

(Australia) Schuback

(Australia) Yates

8
3
6
2
8

(Wales) Stephen Rees

(Wales) John Price

8
6
7

(Wales) Price

(Wales) Rees

3
6
5
6
3

(Scotland) John Summers

(Scotland) Willie Sullivan

3
2
4

(Australia) Schuback

(Australia) Yates

7
9
10

(Wales) Peter Jenkins

(Wales) Mel Jones

6
6
7
6

(Wales) Jenkins

(Wales) Jones

2
4
0

(Northern Ireland) Eric Sands

(Northern Ireland) Jim Baker

5
5
8
4

(Wales) Jenkins

(Wales) Jones

6
8
7
8

(New Zealand) Phil Skoglund

(New Zealand) Peter Belliss

6
8
1
3
11

(New Zealand) Skoglund

(New Zealand) Belliss

7
6
5
4

(Scotland) David Roberts

(Scotland) Tom Hamill

5
2
7
5
0

=== Women's singles ===
==== Group stages ====
Group A Results

Player 1	Player 2	Score
Johnston	Shaw	2-0
Dodd	Morgan	2-0
Morgan	Galbreath	2-1
Johnston	Dodd	2-1
Shaw	Galbreath	2-0
Johnston	Morgan	2-0
Dodd	Galbreath	2-0
Shaw	Morgan	2-0
Johnston	Galbreath	2-0
Dodd	Shaw	2-0

Pos	Player	P	W
1	(Northern Ireland) Margaret Johnston	4	4
2	(Guernsey) Kay Dodd	4	3
3	(England) Norma Shaw	4	2
4	(Wales) Cynthia Morgan	4	1
5	(Scotland) Joan Galbreath	4	0

Group B Results

Player 1	Player 2	Score
Bessell	Elliott	2-1
Davies	Simon	2-0
Davies	Wren	2-0
Elliott	Simon	2-0
Bessell	Wren	2-0
Elliott	Davies	2-1
Wren	Simon	2-0
Bessell	Davies	2-0
Wren	Elliott	2-1
Bessell	Simon	2-1

Pos	Player	P	W
1	(England) Edna Bessell	4	4
2	(Northern Ireland) Freda Elliott	4	2
3	(Wales) Julie Davies	4	2
4	(Scotland) Liz Wren	4	2
5	(Guernsey) Ann Simon	4	0

==== Medal round ====
Semi-finals
(Northern Ireland) Margaret Johnston	3
(Northern Ireland) Freda Elliott	2
(England) Edna Bessell	3
(Guernsey) Kay Dodd	1

Gold-medal match
(Northern Ireland) Margaret Johnston	3
(England) Edna Bessell	1
