= 2002 World Indoor Bowls Championship =

World Indoor Championships 2002
- 24th World Indoor Bowls Championships
- Location: (England) Great Yarmouth, Norfolk
- Date: 08-26 January 2002.
- Category: World Indoor Championships

The 2002 Potters Holidays World Indoor Bowls Championship was held at Potters Leisure Resort, Hopton on Sea, Great Yarmouth, England, from 08-26 January 2002.
In the singles Tony Allcock completed a shock victory. Unseeded and unfancied the Englishman’s win equalled the record of three title wins by David Bryant and Richard Corsie.
In the pairs Hugh Duff & Paul Foster defeated Greg Harlow & Graham Robertson in the final.

The women's singles competition took place in Belfast from April 18–20. The title was won by Carol Ashby.

== Notes ==
A new scoring format was introduced; a game would now consist of two sets of nine ends. If the two sets resulted in draw (one set each) then a deciding set of just three ends would be played to determine the winner.

== Winners ==
Event	Winner
Men's Singles	(England) Tony Allcock
Women's Singles	(England) Carol Ashby
Men's Pairs	(Scotland) Hugh Duff & (Scotland) Paul Foster

== Draw and results ==
=== Men's singles ===
First round
1	(Scotland) Paul Foster	1	7	2
(England) Mark Bantock	13	2	0
16	(England) David Holt	10	2	0
(Australia) Adam Jeffery	8	12	2
8	(Wales) Stephen Rees	9	7
(Wales) David Harding	8	6
9	(Scotland) Hugh Duff	8	5	0
(Northern Ireland) Gary McCloy	7	9	2
4	(Wales) John Price	9	9
(Wales) Jeffrey Webley	6	3
13	(Northern Ireland) Jonathan Ross	9	9
(England) Wynne Richards	6	1
5	(Wales) Robert Weale	3	7
(England) Tony Allcock	12	8
12	(Wales) Jason Greenslade	6	11	2
(England) Mervyn King	11	2	1
3	(Scotland) Alex Marshall	10	4	2
(England) Billy Jackson	7	11	0
14	(England) Andy Thomson	10	9
(England) Greg Moon	3	5
6	(Scotland) Richard Corsie	11	9
(Northern Ireland) Neil Booth	1	6
11	(Hong Kong) Noel Kennedy	10	7
(England) Greg Harlow	5	7
2	(Scotland) David Gourlay	10	12
(Hong Kong) Danny Ho	8	0
15	(England) Ian Bond	7	12	2
(South Africa) Craig Rimmington	9	2	0
7	(England) Les Gillett	4	2
(England) Simon Skelton	9	7
10	(England) Mark McMahon	12	10
(United States) Neil Furman	1	6

Second round
1	(Scotland) Foster	5	12	2
(Australia) Jeffrey	9	0	0
8	(Wales) Rees	4	1
(Northern Ireland) McCloy	11	10
4	(Wales) Price	8	9	0
13	(Northern Ireland) Ross	5	10	2
(England) Allcock	10	8
12	(Wales) Greenslade	5	6
3	(Scotland) Marshall	6	8
14	(England) Thomson	5	7
6	(Scotland) Corsie	6	9
11	(Hong Kong) Kennedy	6	7
2	(Scotland) Gourlay	9	5	1
15	(England) Bond	5	7	2
(England) Skelton	4	11	1
10	(England) McMahon	10	3	2

Quarter-finals
1	(Scotland) Foster	11	6
(Northern Ireland) McCloy	6	4
13	(Northern Ireland) Ross	5	10	0
(England) Allcock	9	3	2
3	(Scotland) Marshall	6	8
6	(Scotland) Corsie	11	8
15	(England) Bond	11	11
10	(England) McMahon	6	9

Semi-finals
1	(Scotland) Foster	3	6
(England) Allcock	9	6
6	(Scotland) Corsie	9	3	2
15	(England) Bond	4	7	0

Final
(England) Allcock	8	9
6	(Scotland) Corsie	3	4

=== Men's Pairs ===
First round

Quarter-finals

Semi-finals

Final

1
(England) Les Gillett

(England) Mark McMahon

10
9

(Wales) Alan Mathias

(Wales) Philip Rowlands

4
4

1
(England) Gillett

(England) McMahon

2
2

8
(England) Greg Harlow

(Scotland) Graham Robertson

14
9

8
(England) Harlow

(Scotland) Robertson

10
9

(Hong Kong) Jimmy Chiu

(Hong Kong) Jacky Wong

3
4

8
(England) Harlow

(Scotland) Robertson

9
8

4
(Scotland) David Gourlay

(Scotland) Alex Marshall

13
9

4
(Scotland) Gourlay

(Scotland) Marshall

4
4

(New Zealand) Rowan Brassey

(New Zealand) Kerry Chapman

1
1

4
(Scotland) Gourlay

(Scotland) Marshall

13
9

5
(Wales) Jason Greenslade

(Wales) Robert Weale

7
7
2

5
(Wales) Greenslade

(Wales) Weale

1
1

(Scotland) Joey Strickland

(Scotland) George Sneddon

8
5
0

8
(England) Harlow

(Scotland) Robertson

8
8
1

2
(Scotland) Hugh Duff

(Scotland) Paul Foster

10
9

2
(Scotland) Duff

(Scotland) Foster

5
10
2

(South Africa) Duanne Abrahams

(South Africa) Donny Piketh

7
2

2
(Scotland) Duff

(Scotland) Foster

11
10

7
(England) David Holt

(England) Tony Allcock

10
2
1

(England) Theobald

(England) Leeman

3
7

(England) Alan Theobald

(England) John Leeman

3
12
2

2
(Scotland) Duff

(Scotland) Foster

4
6
2

3
(Wales) John Price

(Wales) Stephen Rees

5
8
0

(Northern Ireland) Henry

(Northern Ireland) McClure

9
5
1

(Australia) Mark Casey

(Australia) Adam Jeffery

10
6
2

(Australia) Casey

(Australia) Jeffrey

4
2

6
(England) Gary Smith

(England) Andy Thomson

8
3
0

(Northern Ireland) McClure

(Northern Ireland) Henry

8
10

(Northern Ireland) Ian McClure

(Northern Ireland) Jeremy Henry

6
8
2

=== Women's singles ===
First round
(England) Carol Ashby	6	9
(England) Margaret Johnston	5	7
(New Zealand) Wendy Jensen	9	5
(England) Lynda Jarman	1	5
(Wales) Betty Morgan	3	9	2
(Guernsey) Alison Merrien	7	6	0
(Scotland) Julie Forrest	9	9
(Jersey) Karina Horman	5	1

Semi-finals
(England) Ashby	4	11	2
(New Zealand) Jensen	6	3	1
(Wales) Morgan	10	8
(Scotland) Forrest	8	5

Final
(England) Ashby	11	8
(Wales) Morgan	5	8
