= 1987 World Indoor Bowls Championship =

Bowls championship in Coatbridge and Bournemouth

World Indoor Championships 1987
- 9th World Indoor Bowls Championships
- Location: (Scotland) Coatbridge, & (England) Bournemouth,
- Date(s): 07-15 February & 23–29 March 1987.
- Category: World Indoor Championships

The 1987 Embassy World Indoor Bowls Championship was held at the Coatbridge indoor bowling club, North Lanarkshire, Scotland, from 07 to 13 February 1987.
Tony Allcock won his second consecutive title beating David Bryant in the final by 5-4 (0-7, 7–6, 7–3, 3–7, 6–7, 7–6, 1–7, 7–5, 7–2).

The 1987 Midland Bank World Indoor Pairs Championship was held at the Bournemouth International Centre from 23 to 29 March 1987. David Bryant & Tony Allcock won a second consecutive title defeating Stephen Rees & John Price 5–0 in the final (9-3, 7–2, 6–3, 6–4, 8–4).

== Winners ==
Event	Winner
Men's Singles	(England) Tony Allcock
Men's Pairs	(England) Tony Allcock & (England) David Bryant

== Draw and results ==
=== Men's singles ===
First round
(England) Tony Allcock	7	6	7
(Republic of Ireland) Sam Wylie	6	7	4
(Scotland) Angus Blair	7	3	7
(Wales) John Price	6	7	4
(Scotland) Willie Wood	7	2	7
(Canada) Alf Wallace	5	7	2
(Australia) Rob Parrella	7	2	7
(Northern Ireland) Mike Dunlop	1	7	5
(Scotland) Ian Bruce	7	7
(New Zealand) Phil Skoglund	0	5
(Israel) Cecil Bransky	7	7
(England) Lee Shoobridge	4	6
(Northern Ireland) David Corkill	7	7
(Guernsey) Mike Nicolle	1	4
(Wales) Stephen Rees	5	7
(England) Danny Denison	6	0
(England) David Bryant	7	7
(Israel) Jeff Rabkin	1	0
(Scotland) John Watson	7	7
(Northern Ireland) Rodney McCutcheon	5	6
(Scotland) Jim Muir	7	3	7
(Northern Ireland) Jim Baker	4	7	6
(Wales) Terry Sullivan	7	7
(New Zealand) Ian Dickison	1	1
(Scotland) Hugh Duff	7	7
(New Zealand) Peter Belliss	1	0
(Canada) Bill Boettger	7	7
(England) Neil Thompson	0	6
(Australia) Don Peoples	7	7
(Northern Ireland) Alan McMullan	5	4
(Wales) Lyn Tanner	3	7	7
(England) Roy Cutts	7	2	2

Second round
(England) Allcock	7	7	7
(Scotland) Blair	5	0	3
(Scotland) Wood	5	7	7	7
(Australia) Parrella	7	3	5	0
(Scotland) Bruce	2	7	2	7	7
(Israel) Bransky	7	0	7	3	5
(Northern Ireland) Corkill	7	7	7
(Wales) Rees	6	2	4
(England) Bryant	7	6	7	7
(Scotland) Watson	4	7	4	5
(Scotland) Muir	7	7	6	7
(Wales) Sullivan	1	5	7	3
(Scotland) Duff	7	7	7
(Canada) Boettger	2	1	6
(Australia) Peoples	1	7	7	7
(Wales) Tanner	7	3	2	2

Quarter-finals
(England) Allcock	7	7	5	7
(Scotland) Wood	5	2	7	3
(Scotland) Bruce	7	7	4	7
(Northern Ireland) Corkill	6	2	7	3
(England) Bryant	1	5	7	7	7
(Scotland) Muir	7	7	5	0	4
(Scotland) Duff	7	7	4	7
(Australia) Peoples	4	4	7	5

Semi-finals
(England) Allcock	7	2	7	7
(Scotland) Bruce	2	7	1	0
Final
(England) Allcock	5
(England) Bryant	4
(England) Bryant	7	7	4	5	7
(Scotland) Duff	1	0	7	7	4

=== Men's Pairs ===
First round

Quarter-finals

Semi-finals

Final

(England) David Bryant
(England) Tony Allcock
8
5
8

(Scotland) David Gourlay Sr.
(Scotland) John Watson
2
4
2

(England) Bryant

(England) Allcock

8
9
7

(Wales) Mike Hard
(Wales) Charles McGhee
9
5
2
7

(Wales) Hard

(Wales) McGhee

2
3
2

(Canada) Ronnie Jones
(Canada) Bill Boettger
4
3
7
4

(England) Bryant

(England) Allcock

6
8
8

(Northern Ireland) Jim Baker
(Northern Ireland) Rodney McCutcheon
8
8
6
8

(Northern Ireland) McCutcheon

(Northern Ireland) Baker

3
4
5
5

(England) David Cutler
(England) John Bell
7
1
9
3

(Northern Ireland) McCutcheon

(Northern Ireland) Baker

7
10
6

(Israel) Cecil Bransky

(Israel) Jeff Rabkin

7
10
7

(Israel) Bransky

(Israel) Rabkin

5
1
3

(Wales) Terry Sullivan
(Wales) Dai Wilkins
2
2
6

(England) Bryant

(England) Allcock

9
7
6
6
8

(Wales) John Price

(Wales) Stephen Rees

9
9
9

(Wales) Rees

(Wales) Price

3
2
3
4
4

(Republic of Ireland) Robin Horner

(Republic of Ireland) David Gardener

3
3
3

(Wales) Rees

(Wales) Price

2
7
5
8
11

(Scotland) Angus Blair

(Scotland) Richard Corsie

6
7
9

(Scotland) Blair

(Scotland) Corsie

7
6
7
0
3

(Australia) Don Peoples

(Australia) Rob Parrella

5
2
2

(Wales) Rees

(Wales) Price

6
12
2
5

(Northern Ireland) Alan McMullan

(Northern Ireland) David Corkill

8
1
6
5
6

(Northern Ireland) McMullan

(Northern Ireland) Corkill

5
8
8
3

(England) Gary Smith

(England) Andy Thomson

5
8
5
8
5

(Northern Ireland) McMullan

(Northern Ireland) Corkill

9
8
4
7

(New Zealand) Phil Skoglund

(New Zealand) Peter Belliss

8
8
6
8

(New Zealand) Skoglund

(New Zealand) Belliss

4
5
10
4

(Scotland) Mike Walsh

(Scotland) Neil Gillies

7
1
9
3
