= 2003 World Indoor Bowls Championship =

Bowls championship held in Great Yarmouth, Norfolk

World Indoor Championships 2003
- 25th World Indoor Bowls Championships
- Location: (England) Great Yarmouth, Norfolk
- Date: 06-26 January 2003.
- Category: World Indoor Championships

The 2003 Potters Holidays World Indoor Bowls Championship was held at Potters Leisure Resort, Hopton on Sea, Great Yarmouth, England, on 06-26 January 2003. Tony Allcock won his eighth pairs title.

== Winners ==
Event	Winner
Men's Singles	(Scotland) Alex Marshall
Women's Singles	(England) Carol Ashby
Men's Pairs	(England) Tony Allcock & (England) David Holt

== Draw and results ==
=== Men's singles ===
First round
1	(England) Tony Allcock	10	2	0
(Northern Ireland) Neil Booth	5	10	2
16	(England) Greg Harlow	7	11
(Northern Ireland) David Hamilton	8	3
8	(Wales) Robert Weale	8	4	2
(Northern Ireland) Gary McCloy	6	9	1
9	(Australia) Mark McMahon	7	11	2
(Northern Ireland) Michael Nutt	8	9	1
4	(Scotland) Paul Foster	9	14
(Scotland) John Carswell	7	2
13	(England) Andy Thomson	7	7
(Wales) David Harding	5	6
5	(Wales) John Price	8	5	2
(Scotland) Jonathan Allen	8	5	1
12	(England) David Holt	5	9	1
(England) Billy Jackson	11	4	2
3	(Scotland) Alex Marshall	5	9	2
(England) Mervyn King	8	6	1
14	(Wales) Stephen Rees	6	0
(England) Mark Royal	6	9
6	(England) Ian Bond	2	6
(England) Trevor Taylor	9	7
11	(Northern Ireland) Jonathan Ross	3	1
(England) Chris Young	8	10
2	(Scotland) David Gourlay	8	8
(Wales) Jonathan Tomlinson	6	7
15	(England) Les Gillett	7	2	1
(England) Mark Bantock	5	9	2
7	(Scotland) Richard Corsie	12	8	2
(England) Wynne Richards	2	9	0
10	(Wales) Jason Greenslade	7	2
(Scotland) Darren Burnett	8	9

Second round
(Northern Ireland) Booth	8	2	1
16	(England) Harlow	6	8	2
8	(Wales) Weale	3	5
9	(Australia) McMahon	8	8
4	(Scotland) Foster	6	9	2
13	(England) Thomson	9	3	1
5	(Wales) Price	10	11
(England) Jackson	4	2
3	(Scotland) Marshall	9	10
(England) Royal	1	10
(England) Taylor	6	7
(England) Young	7	7
2	(Scotland) Gourlay	9	9
(England) Bantock	4	4
7	(Scotland) Corsie	4	1
(Scotland) Burnett	6	9

Quarter-finals
16	(England) Harlow	6	3
9	(Australia) McMahon	7	10
4	(Scotland) Foster	5	2
5	(Wales) Price	6	9
3	(Scotland) Marshall	8	4	2
(England) Young	6	10	0
2	(Scotland) Gourlay	11	13
(Scotland) Burnett	2	1

Semi-finals
9	(Australia) McMahon	2	9
5	(Wales) Price	11	11
3	(Scotland) Marshall	10	9
2	(Scotland) Gourlay	3	8

Final
5	(Wales) Price	4	5
3	(Scotland) Marshall	10	6

=== Men's Pairs ===
First round

Quarter-finals

Semi-finals

Final

1
(Scotland) Hugh Duff

(Scotland) Paul Foster

8
8

(South Africa) Craig Rimmington

(South Africa) Gavin Erasmus

3
6

1
(Scotland) Duff

(Scotland) Foster

5
7
2

8
(England) Greg Harlow

(Northern Ireland) Jonathan Ross

10
9

8
(England) Harlow

(Northern Ireland) Ross

7
6
0

(Northern Ireland) David Corkill

(Northern Ireland) Nigel Gibson

4
1

1
(Scotland) Duff

(Scotland) Foster

6
9

4
(England) Ian Bond

(England) Andy Thomson

9
4
2

5
(Wales) Weale

(Wales) Greenslade

7
11

(Scotland) Gary Wiggins

(Scotland) John Carswell

2
9
0

4
(England) Bond

(England) Thomson

3
1

5
(Wales) Jason Greenslade

(Wales) Robert Weale

14
11

5
(Wales) Greenslade

(Wales) Weale

12
14

(United States) Nick Christensen

(United States) John Luster

2
4

5
(Wales) Greenslade

(Wales) Weale

9
4
1

2
(Scotland) David Gourlay

(Scotland) Alex Marshall

13
9

6
(England) Holt

(England) Allcock

3
11
2

(Wales) David Davies

(Wales) John Downey

4
6

2
(Scotland) Gourlay

(Scotland) Marshall

9
9

7
(England) Les Gillett

(Australia) Mark McMahon

8
2
2

7
(England) Gillett

(Australia) McMahon

4
5

(Australia) Brett Wilkie

(Australia) Nathan Rice

2
11
0

2
(Scotland) Gourlay

(Scotland) Marshall

8
5

3
(Wales) John Price

(Wales) Stephen Rees

9
2
2

6
(England) Holt

(England) Allcock

9
5

(New Zealand) Gary Lawson

(New Zealand) Adam Newman

4
8
1

3
(Wales) Price

(Wales) Rees

7
6
0

6
(England) David Holt

(England) Tony Allcock

9
7

6
(England) Holt

(England) Allcock

5
7
2

(England) Robert Paxton

(England) Simon Stevens

7
6

=== Women's singles ===
First round
(England) Cheryl Northall	6	6
(England) Lynne Whitehead	6	5
(England) Ellen Alexander	7	9
(Scotland) Margaret Letham	4	4
(Scotland) Julie Forrest	8	3	2
(England) Amy Monkhouse	4	5	1
(Wales) Lisa Forey	3	5
(England) Carol Ashby	6	5

Semi-finals
(England) Northall	2	7	1
(England) Alexander	9	6	2
(Scotland) Forrest	4	1
(England) Ashby	7	10

Final
(England) Alexander	10	3	0
(England) Ashby	5	9	2
