= 1986 World Indoor Bowls Championship =

Bowls championship held in Coatbridge and Bournemouth

World Indoor Championships 1986
- 8th World Indoor Bowls Championships
- Location: (Scotland) Coatbridge and (England) Bournemouth
- Date(s): 3–9 February and 7–13 April 1986
- Category: World Indoor Championships

The 1986 Embassy World Indoor Bowls Championship was held at the Coatbridge indoor bowling club, North Lanarkshire, Scotland, from 3 February to 9 February 1986. Tony Allcock won the title, beating Phil Skoglund in the final.

The inaugural 1986 Midland Bank World Indoor Pairs Championship was held at the Bournemouth International Centre, from 7 April to 13 April 1986. David Bryant and Tony Allcock won the title, beating Bob Fairbairn and Bob Stephenson in the final, 5 sets to 2 (5–6, 8–3, 8–3, 10–1, 1–9, 8–5, 8–3).

== Winners ==
Event	Winner
Men's singles	(England) Tony Allcock
Men's pairs	(England) Tony Allcock and (England) David Bryant

== Draw and results ==
=== Men's singles ===
First round
(England) Tony Allcock
bye
(England) David Cutler	21
(Scotland) Jim Muir	18
(England) Noel Burrows	21
(Northern Ireland) Rodney McCutcheon	17
(Australia) Don Peoples
bye
(New Zealand) Peter Belliss
bye
(Scotland) Richard Corsie	21
(Scotland) Andy Ross	9
(Wales) Terry Sullivan
bye
(Hong Kong) George Souza	21
(Republic of Ireland) Tommy Reeves	18
(New Zealand) Phil Skoglund	21
(Wales) Peter Evans	20
(Israel) Cecil Bransky
bye
(England) David Bryant
bye
(Northern Ireland) David Hamilton	21
(Canada) Ronnie Jones	13
(England) Roy Cutts	21
(Australia) Kenny Williams	10
(Scotland) John Watson
bye
(Scotland) Bob Sutherland	21
(Guernsey) Michael Pike	13
(Northern Ireland) Jim Baker
bye

Second round
(England) Allcock	21
(England) Cutler	18
(England) Burrows	21
(Australia) Peoples	13
(New Zealand) Belliss	21
(Scotland) Corsie	9
(Wales) Sullivan	21
(Hong Kong) Souza	1
(New Zealand) Skoglund	21
(Israel) Bransky	18
(England) Bryant	21
(Northern Ireland) Hamilton	18
(England) Cutts	21
(Scotland) Watson	15
(Scotland) Sutherland	21
(Northern Ireland) Baker	17

Quarter-finals
(England) Allcock	21
(England) Burrows	18
(New Zealand) Belliss	21
(Wales) Sullivan	20
(New Zealand) Skoglund	21
(England) Bryant	16
(England) Cutts	21
(Scotland) Sutherland	20

Semi-finals
(England) Allcock	21
(New Zealand) Belliss
(New Zealand) Skoglund	21
(England) Cutts

Final
(England) Allcock	21
(New Zealand) Skoglund	15

=== Men's pairs ===
==== Group stages ====
Group A
Player 1	Player 2	Score
Bellis & Skoglund	Sullivan & Evans	9-5 6-4
Fairbairn & Stephenson	Muirhead & Harkness	6-4 6-4
Muirhead & Harkness	Bellis & Skoglund	5-6 10-2 7-4
Sullivan & Evans	Fairbairn & Stephenson	8-5 9-6
Muirhead & Harkness	Sullivan & Evans	4-5 7-6 8-5
Fairbairn & Stephenson	Bellis & Skoglund	2-9 7-5 5-4

Group B
Player 1	Player 2	Score
Baker & Allen	Peoples & Williams	10-2 8-5
Nicol & Bruce	Baker & Allen	1-10 5-3 5-4
Ottaway & Bel	Peoples & Williams	6-3 10-3
Nicol & Bruce	Ottaway & Bell	11-8 8-3
Nicol & Bruce	Peoples & Williams	7-8 9-3 8-2
Ottaway & Bell	Baker & Allen	?

Pos	Player	P	W	L	Sets
1	(England) Bob Fairbairn & Bob Stephenson	3	2	1	4-3
2	(Scotland) Fraser Muirhead & Willie Harkness	3	2	1	4-4
3	(New Zealand) Peter Belliss & Phil Skoglund	3	1	2	4-4
4	(Wales) Terry Sullivan & Russell Evans	3	1	2	3-4

Pos	Player	P	W	L	Sets
1	(Scotland) Bruce Nicol & Ian Bruce	3	3	0	6-2
2	(Northern Ireland) Jim Baker & Sammy Allen	3	1	1	3-2
3	(England) John Ottaway & John Bell	3	1	1	2-2
4	(Australia) Don Peoples & Kenny Williams	3	0	3	0-6

Group C
Player 1	Player 2	Score
Boettger & Jones	Allcock & Bryant	7-4 6-9 7-5
Hamilton & McCutcheon	Thomas & Evans	10-3 8-6
Boettger & Jones	Thomas & Evans	13-0 5-4
Bryant & Allcock	Thomas & Evans	8-7 10-3
Hamilton & McCutcheon	Boettger & Jones	9-4 9-2
Bryant & Allcock	Hamilton & McCutcheon	9-3 9-4

Group D
Player 1	Player 2	Score
Souza & Bransky	Wood & Gourlay	10-3 8-3
Wright & Hill	Montgomery & Brankin	7-5 3-7 8-4
Souza & Bransky	Montgomery & Brankin	5-3 8-5
Wood & Gourlay	Montgomery & Brankin	6-7 6-4 8-2
Wright & Hill	Souza & Bransky	7-6 8-4
Wood & Gourlay	Wright & Hill	6-5 4-7 11-1

Pos	Player	P	W	L	Sets
1	(England) David Bryant & Tony Allcock	3	2	1	5-2
2	(Northern Ireland) David Hamilton & Rodney McCutcheon	3	2	1	4-2
3	(Canada) Bill Boettger & Ronnie Jones	3	2	1	4-3
4	(Wales) John Thomas & David Evans	3	0	3	0-6

Pos	Player	P	W	L	Sets
1	(Wales) Jeff Wright & Ray Hill	3	2	1	5-3
2	(Hong Kong) George Souza & (Israel) Cecil Bransky	3	2	1	4-2
3	(Scotland) Willie Wood & David Gourlay Sr.	3	2	1	4-4
4	(Republic of Ireland) Willie Montgomery & Jim Brankin	3	0	3	2-6

==== Medal round ====
Semi-finals
(England) Bryant (England) Allcock	21
(Wales) Wright (Wales) Hill	?
(England) Fairbairn (England) Stephenson	21
(Scotland) Nicol (Scotland) Bruce	?

Gold-medal match
(England) Bryant (England) Allcock	5
(England) Fairbairn (England) Stephenson	2
