= Sarah Gourlay =

Scottish lawn and indoor bowler

Personal information
- Nationality: British (Scottish)
- Born: 28 September 1937 (age 88)

Sport
- Sport: Lawn and indoor bowls
- Club: Annbank BC
Medal record
Representing Scotland
World Outdoor Championships
Gold medal – first place	1985 Melbourne	Women's fours
Gold medal – first place	1992 Ayr	Women's team
Bronze medal – third place	1996 Leamington Spa	Women's team
Silver medal – second place	2000 Moama	Women's fours
Bronze medal – third place	2000 Moama	Women's team
World Indoor Bowls Championships
Gold medal – first place	1992 Guernsey	Women's singles
Commonwealth Games
Gold medal – first place	1994 Victoria	Women's pairs
Atlantic Bowls Championships
Gold medal – first place	1993 Florida	fours
Bronze medal – third place	1997 Llandrindod Wells	fours

Sarah Gourlay (born 28 September 1937) is a former international lawn and indoor bowler who won world championship gold medals and competed at the Commonwealth Games.

== Career ==
Gourlay played lead for the Scottish fours team when winning the 1985 World Outdoor Bowls Championship gold medal in Brisbane. In 1992 she won the 1992 World Indoor Bowls Championship in Guernsey defeating Mary Price in the final.

In 1993 she won the fours gold medal at the inaugural Atlantic Bowls Championships and four years later won a fours bronze at the Championships.

She competed at the Commonwealth Games in 1986 in the fours event, in 1990 in the pairs event, in 1994 where she won a gold medal in the pairs event, in 1998 in the fours event, and in 2002 in the fours event.

She also won the Scottish National Bowls Championships singles title in 1991 & 1995 and the pairs title in 1968 bowling for Annbank.

She is from the famous Scottish Gourlay bowling family and she married David Gourlay Sr. Her son David Gourlay Jr. is also a renowned lawn and indoor bowler and coach.
