= Fleur Bougourd =

Bowler representing Guernsey

Personal information
- Nationality: Guernsey
Medal record
Representing (Guernsey)
World Indoor Bowls Championships
Gold medal – first place	1990 Guernsey	Women's singles

Fleur Bougourd is an indoor and lawn bowler representing Guernsey.

Bougourd won the Women's singles at the 1990 World Indoor Bowls Championship defeating Liz Wren of Scotland in the final.
