= Jim Yates (bowls) =

Australian lawn bowler

Personal information
- Nationality: Australia
- Born: 11 October 1934 (age 91)
Medal record
Representing Australia
World Indoor Championships
Gold medal – first place	1988	Men's pairs

Jim Yates is a former Australian lawn and indoor bowler and coach, born in Corowa, New South Wales on 11 October 1934.

== Bowls career ==
Yates partnered Ian Schuback when he won the 1988 World Indoor Bowls Championship Pairs. He won the Australian Singles Championship in 1979 and the Adelaide Masters in 1983, 1984 and 1987.

Additionally he has won ten Club Singles Championships and played 211 games for the Victorian State team.
