= Caroline McAllister =

Scottish bowls player

Personal information
- Nationality: Scotland
Medal record
Representing Scotland
World Indoor Bowls Championships
Gold medal – first place	1998 Llanelli	Women's singles
Gold medal – first place	1999 Prestwick	Women's singles

Caroline McAllister is a Scottish international indoor and lawn bowler.

McAllister won the Women's singles at the 1998 World Indoor Bowls Championship defeating Carol Ashby in the final. One year later she became the first player to retain the title by beating Kate Adams in the final at the 1999 World Indoor Bowls Championship.
