= Norma Shaw =

British lawn bowler (1937–2009)

Norma Shaw MBE
Personal information
- Nationality: British (English)
- Born: 8 June 1937
- Died: 10 June 2009 (aged 72)

Sport
- Sport: Bowls
- Club: Norton BC
Medal record
Representing England
World Outdoor Championships
Gold medal – first place	1981 Toronto	Singles
Bronze medal – third place	1981 Toronto	Pairs
Gold medal – first place	1981 Toronto	Team
Bronze medal – third place	1985 Melbourne	Pairs
Silver medal – second place	1985 Melbourne	Team
Silver medal – second place	1988 Auckland	Triples
Silver medal – second place	1988 Auckland	Fours
Gold medal – first place	1988 Auckland	Team
Bronze medal – third place	1992 Ayr	Singles
Bronze medal – third place	1992 Ayr	Triples
Bronze medal – third place	1996 Leamington Spa	Fours
Silver medal – second place	1996 Leamington Spa	Team
Silver medal – second place	2000 Moama	Triples
Gold medal – first place	2000 Moama	Team
Commonwealth Games
Bronze medal – third place	1982 Brisbane	Triples
Bronze medal – third place	1994 Victoria	Singles
Bronze medal – third place	1998 Kuala Lumpur	Fours
World Indoor Championships
Gold medal – first place	1997 Llanelli	Singles
Atlantic Bowls Championships
Gold medal – first place	1993 Florida	singles
Silver medal – second place	1993 Florida	pairs
Silver medal – second place	1995 Durban	singles
Silver medal – second place	1995 Durban	pairs
Silver medal – second place	1999 Durban	fours
British Isles Championships
Gold medal – first place	1990	pairs
Gold medal – first place	1983	triples

Norma Shaw MBE (1937-2009), born near Wakefield, was an English international indoor and lawn bowler.

== Bowls career ==
=== World Championship ===
Norma won twelve World Outdoor Bowls Championship medals. The success started with two gold medals and a bronze medal at the 1981 World Outdoor Bowls Championship in Toronto. Four years later she won a silver medal and another bronze at the 1985 World Outdoor Bowls Championship followed by two more silvers at the 1988 World Outdoor Bowls Championship. Norma then competed in her fourth and fifth successive championships at the 1992 World Outdoor Bowls Championship and 1996 World Outdoor Bowls Championship securing a bronze in both. Her final appearance was at the 2000 World Outdoor Bowls Championship in Moama where she won a bronze in the triples and finished with a gold medal in the team event.

=== Commonwealth Games ===
Norma represented England at four Commonwealth Games winning four medals from 1982 until 1998.

=== World Indoor Bowls Championship ===
Norma also won the 1997 World Indoor Bowls Championship held in Llanelli.

=== Atlantic Championships ===
Norma won five medals Atlantic Bowls Championships including a singles gold medal at the 1993 inaugural tournament in Florida.

=== National ===
Norma won eight National Championships bowling for Durham. Theyincluded the singles in 1998, the pairs in 1980 and 1989, the triples in 1982 and the fours in 1977.

Norma was the first woman to break into the male dominated televised tournaments. She died in June 2009.

== Recognition ==
Shaw was appointed Member of the Order of the British Empire in the 1985 Birthday Honours for services to bowls.
