= Joyce Lindores =

British lawn bowler

Personal information
- Nationality: British (Scottish)
- Born: Joyce Scott; 2 May 1944 Galashiels, Selkirkshire, Scotland
- Died: 18 June 2017 (aged 73) Melbourne, Australia

Sport
- Club: Ettrick Forest BC
Medal record
Representing Scotland
World Outdoor Championships
| Gold medal – first place | 1992 Ayr | Triples |
| Gold medal – first place | 1992 Ayr | Fours |
| Gold medal – first place | 1992 Ayr | Team |
| Bronze medal – third place | 1996 Leamington Spa | Singles |
| Bronze medal – third place | 1996 Leamington Spa | Team |
| Gold medal – first place | 2000 Moama | Pairs |
| Silver medal – second place | 2000 Moama | Fours |
| Bronze medal – third place | 2000 Moama | Team |
Commonwealth Games
| Gold medal – first place | 1998 Kuala Lumpur | Pairs |
| Silver medal – second place | 2006 Melbourne | Pairs |
World Indoor Bowls Championships
| Gold medal – first place | 1995 Cumbernauld | Singles |
Atlantic Bowls Championships
| Bronze medal – third place | 1997 Llandrindod Wells | triples |
| Gold medal – first place | 1999 Cape Town | pairs |
| Silver medal – second place | 2005 Bangor | pairs |
| Silver medal – second place | 2005 Bangor | fours |

Joyce Scott Lindores (2 May 1944 – 18 June 2017) was a Scottish international indoor and lawn bowler.

== Bowls career ==
Lindores won the Women's singles at the 1995 World Indoor Bowls Championship defeating Margaret Johnston in the final. Three years later she won the pairs gold medal with Margaret Letham at the 1998 Commonwealth Games. The pair then won the pairs title at the 2000 World Outdoor Bowls Championship in Moama, Australia.

In 2005 she won the pairs and fours silver medals at the Atlantic Bowls Championships in Bangor, previously she had won a triples bronze in 1997 and pairs gold in 1999.

She also won the Scottish National Bowls Championships singles title in 1988 and 1997 and the pairs in 1993 bowling for Ettrick Forest.

Lindores remained in Melbourne after the 2006 Commonwealth Games held there. She died on 18 June 2017 in Melbourne.
