= David Holt (bowls) =

Bowls player

Personal information
- Nationality: British (English) / Australian
- Born: 9 September 1966 (age 60)

Sport
- Club: Bolton (outdoor); The Bowlers (indoor)
Medal record
Representing (England)
Commonwealth Games
Gold medal – first place	2002 Manchester	fours
World Indoor Championships
Gold medal – first place	2003 Yarmouth	pairs
British Isles Championships
Gold medal – first place	1988 Larne	pairs

David Holt (born 1966) is a former England international lawn and indoor bowler who moved to Australia in 2002.

== The Beginning ==
Holt first became interested in bowling because his father was a crown green bowler, and he started bowling aged 12, joining the Winton crown green bowls club. His first experience of flat green bowling was on a two-rink indoor facility that was opened near to his house at the Swinton Pool Hall.

== Bowls career ==
=== England ===
He won the Lancashire County singles title in 1986 at his first attempt, and a year later claimed both the singles and pairs titles at the England National Championships in Worthing, beating experienced international player Tony Allcock 21-5 in the final of the singles to become the event's youngest ever winner.

He won three outdoor national titles in England, the singles and pairs double in 1987, and the fours in 2000, all representing Lancashire, and also claimed the pairs title, representing England, at the 1988 British Isles Bowls Championships.

In 2002 he skipped an England four consisting of him, John Ottaway, Simon Skelton and Robert Newman to a gold medal at the Commonwealth Games in Manchester. He also claimed the pairs title, with Tony Allcock, at the 2003 World Indoor Bowls Championship.

=== Australia ===
He realised a long-held ambition to play bowls in Australia after a discussion with former Australia international Cameron Curtis, who was representing his country at the World Indoor Bowls Championships and offered to ask his club in Sydney if they would sponsor Holt to play in the New South Wales Premier League. They agreed, and he moved to Australia in 2002 and eventually became an Australian citizen.

He won the New South Wales state singles title in 2003, the Australian Champion of Champions in 2013 with a 21-8 win over Western Australia's Daniel Patterson, and the singles event at the 2014 Australian Indoor Championships, defeating then Australia vice-captain Brett Wilkie 2-1 (9-6, 4-7, 2-1) in a tie-break.

He has represented Australia at the World Champion of Champions, the World Cup indoor singles and the 2017 World Indoor Bowls Championship.
