= Phil Skoglund =

New Zealand lawn bowls player

Phil Skoglund OBE
Personal information
- Born: Philip Charles Skoglund; 20 June 1937 Palmerston North, New Zealand
- Died: 8 May 2015 (aged 77) Palmerston North, New Zealand
- Years active: 1958–2015
- Relative(s): Philip Skoglund (father); Pete Skoglund (uncle)

Sport
- Sport: Bowls
- Club: Northern
Medal record
Representing New Zealand
Commonwealth Games
Silver medal – second place	1978 Edmonton	Fours
Bronze medal – third place	1974 Christchurch	Pairs
Bronze medal – third place	1990 Auckland	Fours
World Outdoor Championships
Bronze medal – third place	1980 Melbourne	Men's pairs
Bronze medal – third place	1980 Melbourne	Men's fours
Silver medal – second place	1984 Aberdeen	Men's fours
Silver medal – second place	1984 Aberdeen	Men's team
Gold medal – first place	1988 Auckland	Men's triples
Silver medal – second place	1988 Auckland	Men's fours
Silver medal – second place	1988 Auckland	Men's team

Philip Charles Skoglund OBE (20 June 1937 – 8 May 2015) was a New Zealand lawn bowls player, and part of New Zealand's greatest lawn bowls family dynasty.

== Early life ==
Born in 1937 at Palmerston North, he was the son of politician and cabinet minister Philip Oscar Skoglund and nephew of champion lawn bowls player Pete Skoglund.

== Bowls career ==
He was the youngest New Zealand National Bowls Championships singles champion at 20, in 1958. He competed in five World Championships (1966, 1972, 1980, 1984 & 1988), winning a gold medal (triples 1988), two silver medals (fours 1984 & 1988) and three bronzes (pairs 1980, fours 1980, triples 1984) He competed in five Commonwealth Games, 1970, 1974, 1978, 1982 and 1990 (not 1986 because of a sport-wide dispute over amateurism). He played indifferently in the singles in 1970, hence has been mainly lead in the pairs and fours skip, despite being National singles champion 1970, 1971, 1972 (and in 1958 & 1966). He won a Commonwealth Games bronze in pairs 1974 and in fours 1990; and a silver in fours, 1978.

Skoglund was appointed an Officer of the Order of the British Empire in the 1988 Queen's Birthday Honours, for services to bowls, and was inducted into the New Zealand Sports Hall of Fame in 1990. In 2013, Skoglund was an inaugural inductee into the Bowls New Zealand Hall of Fame.

== Family ==
His son Philip Skoglund junior played for New Zealand at the 1992 World Bowls and the 1994 Commonwealth Games. Philip Skoglund junior and his brother Raymond Skoglund won the National Pairs in 1999, where Philip junior was also runner-up in the National Singles. Together they were second in the National Fours with their father and Brett O'Riley in 1991.

== Personal life ==
Skoglund was a transport company manager and was married to Carol. He died in Palmerston North in 2015.
