= Mary Price (bowls) =

British bowls player (1943–2023)

Personal information
- Nationality: British (English)
- Born: 27 August 1943
- Died: 5 May 2023 (aged 79)
Medal record
Women's indoor bowls
Representing England
World Outdoor Championships
Silver medal – second place	1988 Auckland	fours
Bronze medal – third place	1988 Auckland	pairs
Gold medal – first place	1988 Auckland	team
Bronze medal – third place	1992 Ayr	fours
Bronze medal – third place	1996 Leamington Spa	fours
Silver medal – second place	1996 Leamington Spa	team
Bronze medal – third place	2000 Moama	pairs
Gold medal – first place	2000 Moama	team
Commonwealth Games
Bronze medal – third place	1986 Edinburgh	fours
Bronze medal – third place	1990 Auckland	fours
Bronze medal – third place	1994 Victoria	pairs
World Indoor Bowls Championships
Gold medal – first place	1991 Guernsey	singles
Atlantic Bowls Championships
Bronze medal – third place	1995 Durban	fours
Gold medal – first place	1997 Llandrindod Wells	singles
Gold medal – first place	1997 Llandrindod Wells	pairs
Silver medal – second place	1999 Cape Town	fours
British Isles Championships
Gold medal – first place	1989	singles
Gold medal – first place	1997	fours

Mary Price (27 August 1943 – 5 May 2023) was an English international lawn bowler and indoor bowler.

== Bowls career ==
Mary Price was from Farnham Common in Slough and played competitive cricket, badminton, squash, and hockey but achieved her greatest successes in bowls. After winning the National title in 1988 she became the first woman in England to win both the indoor and outdoor singles titles. She subsequently won the singles at the British Isles Bowls Championships in 1989. Her greatest win was arguably the singles title at the 1991 World Indoor Bowls Championships.

=== World Outdoor Championships ===
Price won five World Championships medals at consecutive Championships starting with a bronze medal in the pairs and silver medal in the fours at the 1988 World Outdoor Bowls Championship. Four years later in Ayr she won a fours bronze and at the 1996 World Outdoor Bowls Championship in Leamington Spa she won another fours bronze medal. the fifth and final medal arrived in Moama in 2000 when she won a pairs bronze with Jean Baker at the 2000 World Outdoor Bowls Championship.

=== Commonwealth Games ===
Price won three bronze medals at consecutive Commonwealth Games. She gained a bronze medal in the fours at the 1986 Commonwealth Games and bronze medals in the pairs at the 1990 Commonwealth Games and 1994 Commonwealth Games.

=== Atlantic Championships ===
Price won four medals at the Atlantic Bowls Championships. In 1995 she won the fours bronze medal in Durban. Two years later in Wales she won double gold in the singles and pairs (with Katherine Hawes). Her fourth and final medal was in 1999 in the fours.

== Management ==
After retiring from international bowls she continued to participate in regional tournaments with her last win coming in the 2023 EIBA Over-60 pairs tournament. She was also the manager of the England women's team for the 2004 World Championships and on the management team for the Commonwealth Games in 2002, 2006 and 2010. She was also a regional selector until she retired in 2020.

== Death ==
Price died on 5 May 2023, at the age of 79.
