= David Le Marquand =

Jersey lawn bowler

Personal information
- Nationality: British (Jersey)
- Born: 2 September 1950 (age 75)

Sport
- Club: Jersey BC
Medal record
Representing Jersey
British Isles Championships
Gold medal – first place	1998	pairs
European Championships
Gold medal – first place	2003 Portugal	mixed pairs

David Le Marquand (born 1950) is a former Jersey international lawn bowler.

== Bowls career ==
Le Marquand has represented Jersey at four consecutive Commonwealth Games, from 1986 to 1998. He took part in the singles event at the 1986 Commonwealth Games, the pairs event at the 1990 Commonwealth Games, the singles event at the 1994 Commonwealth Games and finally the singles event at the 1998 Commonwealth Games.

He became a British champion after winning the 1998 pairs title, at the British Isles Bowls Championships, with Peter Le Long.
