= Richard Corsie =

Scottish bowls player

Richard Corsie MBE
Personal information
- Born: 27 November 1966 (age 59) Scotland

Sport
- Sport: Lawn and indoor bowls
- Club: Craigentinny BC
Medal record
Representing Scotland
World Outdoor Championships
| Silver medal – second place | 1992 Worthing | Singles |
| Gold medal – first place | 1992 Worthing | Pairs |
| Gold medal – first place | 1992 Worthing | Team |
| Bronze medal – third place | 1996 Adelaide | Singles |
| Silver medal – second place | 1996 Adelaide | Pairs |
| Gold medal – first place | 1996 Adelaide | Team |
World Indoor Bowls Championships
| Gold medal – first place | 1989 Preston | Singles |
| Gold medal – first place | 1991 Preston | Singles |
| Gold medal – first place | 1993 Preston | Singles |
| Silver medal – second place | 1994 Preston | Singles |
| Silver medal – second place | 1995 Preston | Singles |
| Gold medal – first place | 1995 Preston | Pairs |
| Gold medal – first place | 1998 Preston | Pairs |
| Silver medal – second place | 2002 Yarmouth | Singles |
| Silver medal – second place | 2003 Yarmouth | Singles |
Commonwealth Games
| Bronze medal – third place | 1986 Edinburgh | Singles |
| Bronze medal – third place | 1990 Auckland | Singles |
| Gold medal – first place | 1994 Victoria | Singles |

Richard Corsie MBE (born 27 November 1966) is a Scottish international outdoor and indoor bowls player, he is considered to be among the best bowls players of all time.

== Early life ==
Corsie was born on 27 November 1966 and grew up in Edinburgh, Scotland.

== Bowls career ==
Corsie won the World Indoor Bowls Championships singles title three times during his career and also won the pairs title twice with Alex Marshall and Graham Robertson respectively.

He competed at the 1986 Commonwealth Games where he won a bronze medal in the singles event and became the youngest Commonwealth Games medallist in bowling.

He won the pairs title at the 1992 World Outdoor Bowls Championship with Marshall and two years later won a Commonwealth Games gold medal in the singles at the 1994 Commonwealth Games beating his long-time nemesis and friend Tony Allcock in the final.

In 1987, he won the Hong Kong International Bowls Classic singles title, in addition to winning the pairs titles in 1988.

He was the Chairman of the Professional Bowls Association when the World Bowls Tour was formed on 1 January 1997.

== Awards ==
Corsie was appointed Member of the Order of the British Empire (MBE) in the 1999 New Year Honours for services to bowls.

He was inducted into the Scottish Sports Hall of Fame in March 2010.
