= Tony Allcock =

English bowls player

Tony Allcock OBE
Personal information
- Nationality: British (English)
- Born: 11 June 1955 (age 71) Thurmaston, Leicestershire

Sport
- Sport: Bowls
- Club: Belgrave BC; Cheltenham BC
Medal record
Representing England
World Outdoor Championships
Gold medal – first place	1980 Melbourne	triples
Gold medal – first place	1980 Melbourne	team
Gold medal – first place	1984 Aberdeen	fours
Silver medal – second place	1984 Aberdeen	pairs
Bronze medal – third place	1984 Aberdeen	team
Silver medal – second place	1988 Auckland	pairs
Bronze medal – third place	1988 Auckland	fours
Gold medal – first place	1988 Auckland	team
Gold medal – first place	1992 Worthing	singles
Silver medal – second place	1992 Worthing	team
Gold medal – first place	1996 Adelaide	singles
Bronze medal – third place	2000 Johannesburg	singles
Commonwealth Games
Silver medal – second place	1994 Victoria	singles
World Indoor Championships
Gold medal – first place	1986 Coatbridge	singles
Gold medal – first place	1986 Bournemouth	pairs
Gold medal – first place	1987 Coatbridge	singles
Gold medal – first place	1987 Bournemouth	pairs
Gold medal – first place	1989 Preston	pairs
Gold medal – first place	1990 Preston	pairs
Gold medal – first place	1991 Preston	pairs
Gold medal – first place	1992 Preston	pairs
Gold medal – first place	1997 Preston	pairs
Gold medal – first place	2002 Yarmouth	singles
Gold medal – first place	2003 Yarmouth	pairs
British Isles Championships
Gold medal – first place	1992	singles
Gold medal – first place	1995	fours

Anthony Allcock OBE (born 1955) is an English bowls player. Born in Leicestershire, England, he is considered to be one of the leading bowlers of his generation and was twice world outdoor singles champion (1992 and 1996) and three times World Indoor Singles Champion (1986, 1987 and 2002).

== Bowls career ==
=== World Outdoor Championships ===
Allcock won double gold at the 1980 World Outdoor Bowls Championship in Melbourne in the team event (Leonard Cup) and triples with Jimmy Hobday and the legendary David Bryant. Four years later he won two more medals including the gold medal in the fours with George Turley, John Bell and Julian Haines at the 1984 World Outdoor Bowls Championship in Aberdeen. After winning three more medals at the 1988 World Outdoor Bowls Championship in Auckland he went on to win two singles gold medals at successive championships. They were at the 1992 World Outdoor Bowls Championship in Worthing and the 1996 World Outdoor Bowls Championship in Adelaide. With his eleven world indoor titles he has won seventeen world titles in total.

=== Commonwealth Games ===
Allcock played in three successive Commonwealth Games in 1990, 1994 and 1998. He won singles silver medal in the 1994 Commonwealth Games in Victoria, British Columbia, Canada.

Allcock was appointed the bowls performance coach for the England team at the 2002 Commonwealth Games. He is the current Chief Executive of Bowls England.

=== World Indoor Championships ===
Allcock was also three times singles and eight times pairs champion at the World Indoor Bowls Championships. The singles wins were in 1986, 1987 and 2002 and the pairs (six with David Bryant) were in 1986, 1987, 1989, 1990 1991, 1992 (and one each with Mervyn King and David Holt) were in 1997 and 2003. 2003 World Indoor Mixed Pairs Championship with Lynne Whitehead.

=== National ===
He has won eight National Championship titles, singles (1990, 1991), triples (1990, 1995), fours (1994) and junior singles (1975, 1977, 1981) bowling for Belgrave BC and then Cheltenham BC. He has also won the singles at the British Isles Bowls Championships in 1992.

== Personal life ==
Allcock was chief executive of Bowls England from 2008 to 2020. Having been appointed a Member of the Order of the British Empire (MBE) in the 1989 New Year Honours for services to bowls, he was promoted to Officer of the Order of the British Empire (OBE) in the 2019 Birthday Honours for services to lawn bowls.

== Publications and videos ==
Allcock has written several books on bowls, and released a series of instructional videos on the subject.

=== Books ===
- Allcock, Tony (1987) Improve Your Bowls, HarperCollinsWillow, ISBN 978-0-00-218271-3
- Allcock, Tony & Rhys Jones, David (1988) Bowls Skills, Golden Books, ISBN 978-0-600-55778-4
- Allcock, Tony (1989) End to End: A Year in Bowls, Heinemann Kingswood, ISBN 978-0-434-98160-1
- Bryant, David; Allcock, Tony & Horton, Edward (1994) Bowl to Win, HarperCollinsWillow, ISBN 978-0-00-218523-3
- Allcock, Tony Winning Bowls, Hutchinson, ISBN 978-0-09-173677-4

=== Videos ===
- Tony Allcock's Art of Bowls (4 volumes)
