= Graham Robertson (bowls) =

Scottish international indoor and lawn bowler

Personal information
- Nationality: British (Scottish)
- Born: 3 June 1957

Sport
- Sport: Lawn and indoor bowls
- Club: Tranent BC
Medal record
Representing Scotland
World Outdoor Championships
Bronze medal – third place	1992 Worthing	Men's triples
Gold medal – first place	1992 Worthing	Men's fours
Gold medal – first place	1992 Worthing	Men's team
World Indoor Championships
Gold medal – first place	1998	Men's pairs
British Isles Championships
Gold medal – first place	1988	singles

Graham Robertson (born 3 June 1957) is a former Scottish international indoor and lawn bowler. He is the second most capped Scottish international of all time. He was inducted into the Scottish Indoor Bowling Hall of Fame in 2016 and is a former national coach.

== Biography ==
Robertson won a gold medal in the fours with Angus Blair, Willie Wood and Alex Marshall at the 1992 World Outdoor Bowls Championship in Worthing. Robertson won the men's pairs at the 1998 World Indoor Bowls Championship with bowls partner Richard Corsie.

He has represented Scotland three times at the Commonwealth Games from 1986 to 1994. He competed at the 1986 Commonwealth Games in the men's fours event, with Jim Boyle, Willie Harkness and Malcolm Graham, finishing in sixth place.

He won the 1987 Scottish National Bowls Championships and subsequently won the singles at the British Isles Bowls Championships in 1988.

In 1990 and 1993, he won the Hong Kong International Bowls Classic singles title, in addition to winning the pairs titles in 1990.

He is a Managing Director of a Sports Surfaces company called Greengauge.
