= Ian Schuback =

Australian bowls player

Ian Schuback OAM
Personal information
- Born: 4 September 1952 (age 73) Sale, Victoria, Australia
- Years active: 1980–present
- Life partner: Sandy Bolton

Sport
- Sport: Bowls
Medal record
Representing Australia
Commonwealth Games
Silver medal – second place	1986	Men's singles
Gold medal – first place	1990	Men's pairs
World Indoor Championships
Gold medal – first place	1988	Men's pairs
Gold medal – first place	1992	Men's singles
Gold medal – first place	1994	Men's pairs
Gold medal – first place	1996	Men's pairs
Asia Pacific Bowls Championships
Silver medal – second place	1991 Kowloon	triples
Silver medal – second place	1991 Kowloon	fours

Ian David "Shoey" Schuback OAM (born 4 September 1952) is an Australian former lawn and indoor bowler, and the only player from outside the United Kingdom to ever win the World Indoor Bowls Championship.

== Biography ==
Schuback bowled for the Coolangatta club in Queensland and was also a former professional tennis coach.

He started bowling in 1980 after watching the Melbourne World Outdoor Championships. Schuback claimed a Men's Singles silver medal at the 1986 Commonwealth Games and then won the 1988 World Indoor Bowls Championship and the 1990 Commonwealth Games Pairs titles.

He won the 1992 World Indoor Bowls Championships Singles, the 1994 World Indoor Bowls Championship Pairs and the 1996 World Indoor Bowls Championship Pairs.

He won two silver medals at the 1991 Asia Pacific Bowls Championships, in Kowloon, Hong Kong.

In the 2009 Australia Day Honours he was awarded the Medal of the Order of Australia (OAM) for "service to lawn bowls as a coach, competitor and commentator". He was also awarded the Australian Sports Medal on 23 August 2000.

== Bibliography ==
=== Books ===
- Bowls: Unbiased and uncensored
