= Wynne Richards =

British lawn bowler

Personal information
- Nationality: English / Welsh
- Born: 10 June 1950 Merthyr Tydfil, Wales

Sport
- Club: Middlesex (indoor); Richmond BC (outdoor)
Medal record
Representing (England)
World Outdoor Championships
Bronze medal – third place	1988 Auckland	triples
Bronze medal – third place	1988 Auckland	fours
Gold medal – first place	1988 Auckland	team
World Indoor Championships
Silver medal – second place	1988 Alexandra Palace	singles
British Isles Championships
Gold medal – first place	1985	singles

Wynne Richards (born 10 June 1950) is a former international lawn and indoor bowler who has represented England.

== Bowls career ==
Richards was born in Merthyr Tydfil in Wales and began bowling at his father's club Troedyrhiw. Troedyrhiw Bowls Club was also the home club of Leon Stanfield who won the British Isles Singles championship in 1966.

Richards moved to London and represented England before winning the 1984 and 1986 English National Championship singles and the singles at the British Isles Bowls Championships in 1985. He has also won the British Isles indoor singles title in 1985.

His best achievement on the international stage came when he finished runner up to Hugh Duff in the 1988 World Indoor Bowls Championship. In addition he won two bronze medals in the triples and fours at the 1988 World Outdoor Bowls Championship.

He represented England at the 1994 Commonwealth Games in the fours event, at the 1994 Commonwealth Games in Victoria, Canada.
