= Rowan Brassey =

New Zealand lawn bowls competitor

Rowan Brassey MNZM
Personal information
- Nationality: New Zealander
- Born: 18 January 1956 (age 70)

Sport
- Sport: Bowls
- Club: Okahu Bay BC; Avondale BC; Cabramatta BC
Medal record
Representing New Zealand
Commonwealth Games
Silver medal – second place	1982 Brisbane	men's fours
Bronze medal – third place	1994 Victoria	men's fours
Bronze medal – third place	1990 Auckland	men's pairs
World Outdoor Championships
Bronze medal – third place	1984 Aberdeen	Men's triples
Silver medal – second place	1984 Aberdeen	Men's fours
Silver medal – second place	1984 Aberdeen	Men's team
Gold medal – first place	1988 Auckland	Men's pairs
Silver medal – second place	1988 Auckland	Men's fours
Silver medal – second place	1988 Auckland	Men's team
Gold medal – first place	2000 Johannesburg	Men's triples
Bronze medal – third place	2000 Johannesburg	Men's fours
Bronze medal – third place	2000 Johannesburg	Men's team
Silver medal – second place	2004 Ayr	Men's triples
Silver medal – second place	2004 Ayr	Men's team
Asia Pacific Bowls Championships
Silver medal – second place	1987 Lae	singles
Bronze medal – third place	1991 Kowloon	pairs
Gold medal – first place	1995 Dunedin	pairs
Silver medal – second place	1995 Dunedin	singles
Gold medal – first place	1997 Warilla	singles
Gold medal – first place	1997 Warilla	pairs
Bronze medal – third place	2001 Moama	triples
Bronze medal – third place	2001 Moama	fours

Rowan James Brassey MNZM (born 18 January 1956) is a former New Zealand international lawn and indoor bowls player.

== Bowls career ==
An earth-moving contractor by trade, Brassey's first national success was the 1980 New Zealand Open Pairs. He went on to win eight New Zealand National Bowls Championships titles in the pairs (1982) and the fours (1981, 1982, 1990, 1995, 2002, 2003 & 2012/13) when bowling for the Okahu Bay, Avondale and Cabramatta Bowls Clubs respectively.

Brassey has competed at five World Bowls Championships, 1984, 1988, 1992, 1996 & 2000; winning gold in 1988 (pairs, with Peter Belliss), and in 2000 he won the gold medal with Andrew Curtain and Peter Belliss in the men's triples at the 2000 World Outdoor Bowls Championship in Johannesburg.

He has competed at six Commonwealth Games: 1982, 1990, 1994, 1998, 2002 and 2006.

In 1990, Brassey was awarded the New Zealand 1990 Commemoration Medal. In the 2001 New Year Honours, he was appointed a Member of the New Zealand Order of Merit, for services to bowls.

He won eight medals at the Asia Pacific Bowls Championships including three gold medals.

In 2013, Brassey was an inaugural inductee into the Bowls New Zealand Hall of Fame.
