= Hugh Duff (bowls) =

Scottish lawn and indoor bowler

Personal information
- Nationality: British (Scottish)
- Born: c.1966

Sport
- Sport: Lawn & indoor bowls
- Club: West Park Hull BC (outdoors); Auchinleck (indoors)
Medal record
Representing Scotland
Men's bowls
World Indoor Championships
Gold medal – first place	1988	Men's singles
Gold medal – first place	1997	Men's singles
Gold medal – first place	2002	Men's pairs

Hugh Duff is a retired Scottish lawn and indoor bowler. He was a member of the Auchinleck Indoor Bowling Club.

== Biography ==
Duff won two world indoor singles title in 1988 and nine years later in 1997. Duff also partnered fellow Scotsman Paul Foster when winning the 2002 World Indoor Pairs.

Bowling as a member of the West Park, Hull club he finished runner-up to Stephen Farish in the 1992 English national singles. In 1995, he was sent home from the Scottish squad after breaking curfew rules.

After losing in a preliminary match in the 2003 World Indoor Bowls Championship, Duff announced that he would retire from the sport.
