= Mark McMahon (bowls) =

Lawn bowler

Personal information
- Born: 1970 (age 55–56) Scotland
Medal record
Representing Hong Kong
Commonwealth Games
Silver medal – second place	1990 Auckland	Men's singles
Asia Pacific Bowls Championships
Silver medal – second place	1989 Suva	pairs
Silver medal – second place	1989 Suva	fours
Silver medal – second place	1991 Kowloon	pairs
Bronze medal – third place	1993 Victoria	pairs
Silver medal – second place	1993 Victoria	fours
Representing England
World Indoor Championships
Gold medal – first place	2001 Great Yarmouth	Men's pairs

Mark McMahon is a Scottish born indoor and lawn bowls player, who has represented England, Hong Kong and Australia at international level.

== Bowls ==
=== Outdoors ===
He has had a nomadic career being born in Scotland but representing Hong Kong until 1995 and then England and Australia at international level. He represented Hong Kong at three Commonwealth Games in 1986, 1990 and 1994 with his greatest achievement being a silver medal in the singles at the 1990 Commonwealth Games in Auckland, New Zealand.

He won five medals at the Asia Pacific Bowls Championships representing Hong Kong, they were four silver medals and one bronze medal from 1989 to 1993. In 1988, he won the Hong Kong International Bowls Classic pairs title.

=== Indoors ===
He has competed at the World indoor Championships since 1989 and has reached a career best seeding of three and we won the 2001 World Indoor Bowls Championship pairs title in Great Yarmouth with bowls partner Les Gillett.

== Family ==
Both of his parents Bill McMahon and Rosemary McMahon were international bowlers.
