= Gary Smith (bowls) =

Personal information
- Nationality: British (English)
- Born: 13 October 1958 (age 67)

Sport
- Club: Blackheath & Greenwich
Medal record
Representing England
World Indoor Bowls Championships
Gold medal – first place	1993	Men's pairs
Commonwealth Games
Bronze medal – third place	1994 Victoria	Men's pairs
British Isles Championships
Gold medal – first place	1993	pairs

Gary Andrew Smith (born 13 October 1958) is a former English lawn and indoor bowler and is the Chief Executive of World Bowls. He is not to be confused with the Durham indoor bowler Gary R Smith.

== Bowls career ==
Smith partnered Andy Thomson when they won the 1993 World Indoor Bowls Championship Pairs. He started playing at the age of 15 and played for the Blackheath and Greenwich bowls clubs and the Cyphers indoor club at Beckenham.

Indoors, Smith also won the EIBA Pairs in 1986, 1991 & 1994 and Fours in 1983, 1984, 1988, 1990, 1992 & 1993. In 1988 he experienced singles success after winning the EIBA Singles and one year later captured the 1988 CIS Insurance UK singles title.

He represented England in the pairs partnering Andy Thomson, at the 1994 Commonwealth Games in Victoria, and they won a bronze medal.

He is also a three times outdoor National champion. He won the national pairs in 1992, bowling with Andy Thomson for Blackheath & Greenwich.

== Business career ==
Smith was appointed by World Bowls on 24 August 2001. He is the current Chief Executive Officer and also a Director of the World Bowls Tour.
