= David Corkill =

British bowler and commentator (born 1960)

Personal information
- Nationality: Northern Irish
- Born: 15 February 1960 (age 66) Belfast, Northern Ireland

Sport
- Club: Belmont (outdoor); P.T Watson Stadium (indoor)
Medal record
Representing combined Ireland
British Isles Championships
Gold medal – first place	1981	singles
Gold medal – first place	1978	fours

David Corkill (born 15 February 1960) is a Northern Irish sports commentator and former outdoor international lawn and current indoor bowler.

== Bowls career ==
David, from Belfast in Northern Ireland, started bowling at an early age in Tullycarnet Park where he played for Sandown Park. He joined the Knock outdoor club and won the Irish National Bowls Championships Fours title in 1977 and the singles title in 1980 and 1988. He also won the singles at the British Isles Bowls Championships in 1981.

He represented Northern Ireland at the 1982 Commonwealth Games and 1990 Commonwealth Games and the combined Irish team at the World Bowls Championships. He has earned 117 caps for Ireland playing indoors, becoming the most capped bowler in the British Isles.

He was a former Chairperson of the Professional Bowls Association and was a Director for World Bowls from 2002-2006.

== Commentating ==
He is the voice for the BBC during the televised stages of the World Indoor Bowls Championships and in recent years YouTube. He also served as a voiceover commentator for the BBC quiz show The Edge. He was the lead BBC Lawn Bowls commentator at the 2022 Commonwealth Games.
