= Stephen Rees =

Personal information
- Nationality: Wales
- Born: 13 February 1960 (age 66)

Sport
- Club: Old Landorians BC
Medal record
Representing Wales
World Outdoor Championship
Gold medal – first place	2000	Men's fours
World Indoor Championships
Gold medal – first place	1999	Men's pairs

Stephen Rees is a lawn bowler and indoor bowler born on 13 February 1960.

== Bowls career ==
Rees is from St Thomas in Swansea and took up bowls in 1978. He shot to prominence in 1986 when he won the CIS UK singles title defeating David Bryant in the final.

His greatest moment arrived when he won a fours gold medal at the 2000 World Outdoor Bowls Championship in Johannesburg. Another major achievement was winning the 1999 World Indoor Bowls Championship Pairs title with John Price.

He also won the 1990 pairs title at the Welsh National Bowls Championships with Terry Sullivan.
