= John Price (bowls) =

Welsh lawn and indoor bowler and commentator

Personal information
- Nationality: Welsh
- Born: 14 September 1960 (age 65) Port Talbot

Sport
- Club: (indoor) Port Talbot (outdoor) Aberavon
Medal record
Representing Wales
Commonwealth Games
Silver medal – second place	1994	Men's pairs
Silver medal – second place	1998	Men's singles
World Indoor Championships
Gold medal – first place	1990	Men's singles
Gold medal – first place	1999	Men's pairs
Gold medal – first place	2005	Mixed pairs
Gold medal – first place	2006	Mixed pairs
British Isles Championships
Gold medal – first place	1982	pairs
Gold medal – first place	1983	triples

John Haydn Price is a former Welsh international lawn and indoor bowler and current bowls commentator.

== Bowls career ==
=== Early life ===
Brought into the game by his grandparents at the age of 10, and as a schoolboy, he initially played only during the summer holidays, winning a couple of open tournaments in partnership with his father Harry. He started to take bowls seriously after earning his first Wales cap in 1979.

Price is one of the founder members of both the Professional Bowls Association and also the World Bowls Tour, and is a timeless ace on the portable rink, .

=== World Indoor Championships ===
Price is a four times World indoor champion, winning the singles in 1990. Price also made the 2005 final fifteen years after his first singles title was achieved, where he lost to Paul Foster in the final. He teamed up with Stephen Rees to lift the 1999 World Indoor Pairs, and was twice World Mixed Pairs champion when he partnered Carl Ashby in the 2005 and 2006 finals.

=== Commonwealth Games ===
He was a pairs Commonwealth Games silver medallist at the 1994 Commonwealth Games with Robert Weale. He also represented Wales at the 1990 Commonwealth Games.

=== National titles ===
He has amassed ten indoor Welsh National Titles and four indoor British Isle Titles and two Welsh National Bowls Championships outdoor titles, the triples in 1982 and the pairs in 1981, the latter with his father Harry Price when bowling for Aberavon BC. The pair were then successful in winning the corresponding British Isles Bowls Championships.

=== Administration & commentating ===
He is the Vice Chairperson of the Professional Bowls Association. He assists David Corkill in the commentary box for the BBC during the televised stages of the World Indoor Bowls Championships.
