= Darren Gualtieri =

Scottish lawn bowler

Personal information
- Nationality: British (Scottish)
- Born: 26 March 1990 (age 36)

Sport
- Club: Hyndland BC

Achievements and titles
- Highest world ranking: 10 (March 2025)
Medal record
Representing Scotland
World Singles Champion of Champions
Silver medal – second place	2023 Gold Coast	singles
European Championships
Silver medal – second place	2024 Ayr	fours
Silver medal – second place	2024 Ayr	triples
Gold medal – first place	2024 Ayr	team
British Isles Bowls Championships
Silver medal – second place	2024 Leamington Spa	pairs
National Championships
Gold medal – first place	2022 Ayr	singles
Hong Kong International Classic
Gold medal – first place	2024 Hong Kong	pairs
Gold medal – first place	2025 Hong Kong	pairs

Darren Gualtieri (born 26 March 1990) is a Scottish international lawn and indoor bowler. He reached a career high ranking of world number 10 in March 2025.

== Bowls Career ==
Gualtieri reached the semifinal of the SIBA national singles in 2013, losing to eventual champion Thomas Mann of West Lothian IBC. He represented Scotland at under 25 international level both outdoor and indoor.

Gualtieri won a bronze medal in the singles at the 2018 Scottish National Bowls Championships. He lost in the semi final to eventual champion Mark O'Hagan. He then won a gold medal in the singles four years later, at the 2022 National Championships in Ayr, beating former champion Mark Kelsey 21-13 in the final.

Gualtieri was first selected for the Bowls Scotland outdoor international team in 2023, the same year that he was selected for the SIBA Scotland indoor international team.

In 2023, he won a silver medal in the World Singles Champion of Champions at Club Robina in the Gold Coast of Australia. Gualtieri lost to Daniel Salmon of Wales 0-8, 2-3 in the final.

In 2024, alongside brother Ryan Gualtieri, he won a silver medal at the British Isles Bowls Championships in the pairs, losing 14-15 in the final to England's Nick Wardle & Joe Dawson at Leamington Spa. Shortly afterwards, he was selected as part of the team to represent Scotland at the 2024 European Bowls Championships. He participated in the men's triples and the men's fours events. In the triples, Gualtieri alongside Blair Davidson and Dean Riva won a silver medal after losing to England 10-17 in the final. In the fours, Gualtieri alongside Blair Davidson, Darren Weir and Dean Riva won a silver medal after losing to Ireland 12-13 in the final. Scotland secured the overall team event gold.

In November 2024 Gualtieri represented Scotland at the prestigious Hong Kong International Bowls Classic, winning the pairs with Iain McLean after beating England 13-6, 9-7 in the final. Gualtieri also competed in the singles event reaching the last 16.

In December 2024, Gualtieri reached a career high world ranking of 11. In December 2025, he successfully retained the pairs crown at the Hong International Classic, but with a different partner in Gary Prunty.
