= Stephen Hill =

Stephen or Steven Hill may refer to:

== Media ==
- Steven Hill (1922–2016), American actor
- Stephen Clancy Hill (1976–2010), American pornographic actor
- Steven Hill (model) (born 1978), American reality television personality and model
- Stephen Hill (broadcaster), American producer and host of the Hearts of Space radio program
- Stevie B (Steven Bernard Hill, born 1958), American singer, songwriter, and producer
- Stephen Hill (actor) (born 1976), American actor known for 12 Steps to Recovery and Magnum P.I.

== Sports ==
- Steve Hill (footballer) (1940–2010), English footballer
- Stephen Hill (footballer, born 1982), English footballer
- Stephen Hill (Australian footballer) (born 1990), Australian rules footballer
- Stephen Hill (American football) (born 1991), American football player
- Steven Hill (baseball) (born 1985), American baseball player
- Steven Hill (basketball) (born 1985), American professional basketball player
- Steve Hill (horse trainer), trainer of champion Tennessee Walking Horses
- Steven Hill (judoka) (born 1971), Australian judoka
- Steve Hill (bowls) (born 1957), Welsh lawn bowler

== Other ==
- Stephen P. Hill (1806–1884), Baptist clergyman and legislative chaplain
- Steve Hill (evangelist) (1954–2014), clergyman and evangelist
- Stephen John Hill (1809–1891), British colonial governor
- Stephen D. Hill (born 1950), judge on the Kansas Court of Appeals
- Steven Hill (author) (born 1958), political writer, author and political reformer
- Stephen Hill (academic) (1946–2023), professor of management at the University of London
- Stephen Hill (entrepreneur) (born 1962), Australian skateboard and streetwear entrepreneur, producer and advocate
- Steven A. Hill, director of research at Research England
- Stephen Snyder-Hill (born 1970), American Army Officer, LGBT rights activist, known for been booed at the 2011 Republican Party Primary presidential debate in Orlando Florida
