= Garry Hood =

Scottish international lawn bowler

Personal information
- Nationality: British (Scottish)
- Born: c.1962

Sport
- Sport: Lawn and indoor bowls
- Club: Mauchline BC
Medal record
Representing Scotland
British Isles Championships
Gold medal – first place	1996	triples
Scottish Nationals
Gold medal – first place	1995	triples

Garry Hood (born c.1962) is a former international lawn bowler from Scotland who competed at the Commonwealth Games.

== Biography ==
Hood was a member of the Mauchline Bowls Club and represented Scotland at international level.

Hood represented the Scottish team at the 1994 Commonwealth Games in Victoria, Canada, where he competed in the fours event, with Willie Wood, Billy Hay and Ian Laird.

He was the triples champion of Scotland at the 1995 Scottish National Bowls Championships and subsequently qualified to represent Scotland at the British Isles Bowls Championships, wwinning the triples title in 1996.

In 1996 he was appointed the bowls co-ordinator for the Thomson Travel Group in Cyprus.

In 2022, Hood who suffered from Guillain–Barré syndrome, was due to go to his second Commonwealth Games, 28 years after his first. However he lost his place when Bowls Scotland withdrew him following a social media post by Hood.
