= Sandra Steven =

Scottish international lawn bowler

Personal information
- Nationality: British (Scottish)
- Born: 29 November 1969 (age 56)

Sport
- Sport: Lawn and indoor bowls
- Club: Uphall Station BC
Medal record
Representing Scotland
Scottish Nationals
Gold medal – first place	1998	singles
Gold medal – first place	2006, 2008, 2014, 2016, 2017	pairs

Sandra Steven (born 29 November 1969) is an international lawn bowler from Scotland who competed at the Commonwealth Games.

== Biography ==
Steven was a member of the Uphall Station Bowls Club and represented Scotland at international level from 1999 to 2010.

Steven represented the Scottish team at the 2002 Commonwealth Games in Manchester, England, where she competed in the fours event, with Betty Forsyth, Joyce Dickey and Sarah Gourlay.

She was the singles champion of Scotland at the 1998 Scottish National Bowls Championships and won five pairs title with Kirsteen McLelland from 2006 to 2017. She subsequently qualified to represent Scotland at the British Isles Bowls Championships.
