= Joyce Dickey =

Scottish international lawn bowler

Personal information
- Nationality: British (Scottish)
- Born: 27 August 1958 (age 67)

Sport
- Sport: Lawn and indoor bowls
- Club: Hawick BC
Medal record
Representing Scotland
Scottish Nationals
Gold medal – first place	1998	pairs

Joyce Dickey (born 27 August 1958) is an international lawn bowler from Scotland who competed at the Commonwealth Games.

== Biography ==
Dickey began playing bowls in 1980 and was a member of the Hawick Bowls Club. She represented Scotland at international level from 1992 to 2014.

Dickey represented the Scottish team at the 2002 Commonwealth Games in Manchester, England, where she competed in the fours event, with Betty Forsyth, Sandra Steven and Sarah Gourlay.

She was the pairs champion of Scotland with Julie Forrest at the 1998 Scottish National Bowls Championships and subsequently qualified to represent Scotland at the British Isles Bowls Championships.

Dickey was three times winner of the Ayr Bowling tournament in 2008, 2010 and 2012 and as of 2023 was still active in bowls.
