= Len Le Ber =

British lawn bowler

Personal information
- Nationality: British (Guernsey)

Sport
- Club: Vale Recreation BC
Medal record
Representing Guernsey
Atlantic Bowls Championships
Bronze medal – third place	2007 Ayr	triples
British Isles Championships
Gold medal – first place	2009	triples
Gold medal – first place	2013	fours

Len Le Ber is a former international lawn bowler who represented Guernsey.

== Bowls career ==
Le Ber has represented Guernsey at the Commonwealth Games, in the fours at the 2002 Commonwealth Games in Manchester.

In 2007, he won the triples bronze medal at the Atlantic Bowls Championships. He retired from international competition following the 2007 medal.

He is a two times British champion after winning the 2009 triples and the 2013 fours titles, at the British Isles Bowls Championships.

== Personal life ==
His son is Matt Le Ber.
