= George Ferguson (bowls) =

Scottish lawn bowler

Personal information
- Nationality: British (Scottish)
- Born: Scotland

Sport
- Sport: Lawn bowls
- Club: Cumnock Bowling Club
Medal record
Representing Scotland
National Championships
Gold medal – first place	1955	fours/rinks

George Ferguson was a Scottish international lawn bowler who competed at the British Empire and Commonwealth Games (now Commonwealth Games).

== Biography ==
Ferguson was a member of the Cumnock Bowling Club and was part of the Cumnock four of Thomas Smetherham, John Hampson and Alexander Hodge, that won the 1955 McEwan Trophy (the Scottish National Bowls Championships).

He represented the 1958 Scottish team at the 1958 British Empire and Commonwealth Games in Cardiff, Wales, where he participated in the fours/rinks event, with Thomas Smetherham, John Hampson and Alexander Hodge, finishing in sixth place.
