= George Niven (bowls) =

Scottish lawn bowler

Personal information
- Nationality: British (Scottish)
- Born: 1879 Ladhope, Scotland
- Died: 1949 (aged 69–70) Galashiels, Scotland

Sport
- Sport: Lawn bowls
- Club: Abbotsford BC, Galashiels
Medal record
Representing Scotland
National Championships
Gold medal – first place	1933	pairs

George Begbie Niven (1879 – 1949) was a Scottish Lawn bowls international who competed in the 1934 British Empire Games.

== Bowls career ==
Niven was a member of Abbotsford Bowling Club of Galashiels and was a woollen pattern weaver, living at 46 Douglas Place in Galashiels. In 1933, partnering his older brother Alex Niven, they won the inaugural Scottish National Bowls Championships pairs title.

He represented the Scottish team at the 1934 British Empire Games in London, England. He competed in the pairs event with Alex Niven, where they finished in fifth place.

In 1936 he was elected as vice-president of the Gala Abbotsford Bowling Club.
