= Ian Laird =

Scottish international lawn bowler

Personal information
- Nationality: British (Scottish)

Sport
- Sport: Lawn and indoor bowls
- Club: Insch BC

Ian Laird is a former international lawn and indoor bowler from Scotland who competed at the Commonwealth Games.

== Biography ==
Laird was a member of the Insch Bowls Club and represented Scotland at international level.

By profession Laird worked for the Royal Bank of Scotland and by June 1994 had accumulated 33 caps for Scotland in the home international series.

Laird represented the Scottish team at the 1994 Commonwealth Games in Victoria, Canada, where he competed in the fours event, with Willie Wood, Billy Hay and Garry Hood. Also in 1994, he won the Culter Club indoor pairs for the third successive year.
