= Karina Bisson =

British lawn bowler (born 1966)

Karina Bisson (née Karina Horman)
Personal information
- Nationality: British (Jersey)
- Born: 7 June 1966 (age 60)
Medal record
Representing Jersey
World Outdoor Championships
Silver medal – second place	2004 Leamington Spa	fours
Atlantic Bowls Championships
Silver medal – second place	1997 Llandrindod Wells	triples
British Isles Championships
Gold medal – first place	2006	singles
Gold medal – first place	2004	pairs
Gold medal – first place	2009	fours

Karina Anna Bisson (born 1966) is an international lawn and indoor bowler representing Jersey.

== Bowls career ==
In 1997 under her maiden name Karina Horman she won triples silver medal at the Atlantic Bowls Championships. She then just missed out on a medal in the singles at the 2000 World Outdoor Bowls Championship after losing to the legendary Karen Murphy of Australia in the bronze medal play off by a score of 21–4.

Karina was part of the fours team with Christine Grimes, Suzie Dingle and Gean O'Neil that won the silver medal at the 2004 World Outdoor Bowls Championship in Leamington Spa.

Bisson became the first woman from the Channel Islands to win the singles at the British Isles Bowls Championships. The singles success came in 2006, two years after winning the pairs and a third tile arrived in 2009 when she was part of the fours winning team.
