= Christine Grimes =

British lawn and indoor bowler

Personal information
- Nationality: British (Jersey)
- Born: 25 December 1950 (age 75) Middleton
Medal record
Representing Jersey
World Outdoor Championships
Silver medal – second place	2004 Leamington Spa	fours
Atlantic Bowls Championships
Bronze medal – third place	2005 Bangor	triples
Gold medal – first place	2007 Ayr	fours
Bronze medal – third place	2011 Paphos	singles
British Isles Championships
Gold medal – first place	2009	fours
Gold medal – first place	2013	fours
European Championships
Bronze medal – third place	2013 Spain	pairs

Christine Anne Grimes (born 25 December 1950) is an international lawn and indoor bowler representing Jersey.

== Bowls career ==
Christine was part of the fours team with Suzie Dingle, Gean O'Neil and Karina Bisson that won the silver medal at the 2004 World Outdoor Bowls Championship in Leamington Spa.

Grimes has represented Jersey at four Commonwealth Games; in the triples at the 2006 Commonwealth Games, the pairs at the 2010 Commonwealth Games, the fours at the 2014 Commonwealth Games and in the pairs & fours at the 2018 Commonwealth Games.

In 2005 she won the triples bronze medal at the Atlantic Bowls Championships and two years later she won the triples gold medal at the 2009 Atlantic Bowls Championships. In 2011 she won the singles bronze medal at the Atlantic Bowls Championships.

Grimes is a two times British champion after winning the fours titles in 2009 and 2013 at the British Isles Bowls Championships.
