= Alexander Hodge (bowls) =

Scottish lawn bowler

Personal information
- Nationality: British (Scottish)
- Born: Scotland

Sport
- Sport: Lawn bowls
- Club: Cumnock Bowling Club
Medal record
Representing Scotland
National Championships
Gold medal – first place	1955	fours/rinks

Alexander Hodge was a Scottish international lawn bowler who competed at the British Empire and Commonwealth Games (now Commonwealth Games).

== Biography ==
Hodge was a member of the Cumnock Bowling Club and was part of the Cumnock four of Thomas Smetherham, John Hampson and George Ferguson, that won the 1955 McEwan Trophy (the Scottish National Bowls Championships).

Hodge made his international debut in 1958, and represented the 1958 Scottish team at the 1958 British Empire and Commonwealth Games in Cardiff, Wales, where he participated in the fours/rinks event, with Thomas Smetherham, John Hampson and George Ferguson, finishing in sixth place.
