= Robert Sprot =

British lawn bowls player

Bob Sprot
Personal information
- Nationality: British (Scottish)
- Born: 11 December 1873 Cambusnethan, Wishaw, Scotland
- Died: 15 October 1947 (aged 73) Strathaven, South Lanarkshire, Scotland

Sport
- Sport: Lawn bowls
- Club: Wishaw BC
Medal record
Men's Lawn bowls
Representing Scotland
British Empire Games
Gold medal – first place	1934 London	Singles

Robert Sprot (1873-1947) was a British international lawn bowls player who competed in the 1934 British Empire Games.

== Bowls career ==
At the 1934 British Empire Games he won the gold medal in the singles event.

He was capped 33 times and was the Scottish singles champion in 1910, 1920 and 1929 becoming the first player to win the title on three occasions. His uncle George Sprot also won the Scottish National Bowls Championships in 1894 and 1896 (the former being the inaugural singles championship).

His three singles titles stood as a record for 96 years. Although equalled several times by David Dall in 1949, Joseph Black in 1962 and Darren Burnett in 2005, it was not beaten until 2025, when Iain McLean won his fourth.
