= Ross Davis (bowls) =

Bowls player from Jersey (born 1994)

Personal information
- Nickname: Rossco
- Nationality: British (Jersey)
- Born: 5 March 1994 (age 32) Jersey, United Kingdom

Sport
- Sport: Lawn bowls
- Club: Sun BC

Achievements and titles
- Highest world ranking: 15 (October 2024)
Medal record
Representing Jersey
Atlantic Bowls Championships
Bronze medal – third place	2019 Cardiff	pairs
British Isles Championships
Gold medal – first place	2016	fours
Gold medal – first place	2018	singles
Gold medal – first place	2019	pairs
Gold medal – first place	2023	pairs
European Championships
Silver medal – second place	2024 Ayr	singles
Silver medal – second place	2024 Ayr	pairs

Ross Davis (born 5 March 1994) is an international lawn bowls player from Jersey. He reached a career high ranking of world number 15 in October 2024.

== Bowls career ==
=== Commonwealth Games ===
Davis represented Jersey at the 2018 Commonwealth Games on the Gold Coast, Australia. He competed in the triples event where the team reached the quarter-finals. In October 2021, Davis was selected to represent Jersey in the 2022 Commonwealth Games being held in Birmingham. In 2022, he competed in the men's singles and the men's pairs at the 2022 Commonwealth Games. Evans took part in the men's pairs at the 2026 Commonwealth Games in Glasgow, Scotland.

=== Other events ===
Davis has won four British Isles Bowls Championships titles, he won the blue riband event (the singles) in 2018 in addition to the 2016 fours and 2019 and 2023 pairs. In 2019 he won the pairs bronze medal at the Atlantic Bowls Championships. In 2020 he was selected for the 2020 World Outdoor Bowls Championship in Australia.

In 2023, he won the pairs title for the second time, with Malcolm De Sousa at the British Isles Bowls Championships, held in Ayr. In 2024, he won a silver medal in the singles and in the pairs at the 2024 European Bowls Championships.

Davis was serving as the Junior Vice President of Bowls Jersey in 2017.
