= Iain McLean =

Scottish lawn bowler

Personal information
- Nationality: British (Scottish)
- Born: 8 October 1983 (age 43)

Sport
- Sport: Lawn bowls
- Club: Blackwood Victoria BC

Achievements and titles
- Highest world ranking: 3 (December 2024)
Medal record
World Outdoor Championships
| Bronze medal – third place | 2016 Christchurch | fours |
| Bronze medal – third place | 2016 Christchurch | team |
| Bronze medal – third place | 2023 Gold Coast | singles |
| Bronze medal – third place | 2023 Gold Coast | team |
Commonwealth Games
| Bronze medal – third place | 2022 Birmingham | singles |
World Singles Champion of Champions
| Gold medal – first place | 2014 New Zealand | singles |
| Bronze medal – third place | 2025 Australia | singles |
Hong Kong International Classic
| Gold medal – first place | 2024 | singles |
| Gold medal – first place | 2024 | pairs |
British Bowls Championships
| Gold medal – first place | 2026 Ayr | singles |

Iain Donald Smith McLean (born 8 October 1983) is a Scottish international lawn bowler. He reached a career high ranking of world number 3 in December 2024.

== Bowls career ==
McLean won a bronze medal in the fours at the 2016 World Outdoor Bowls Championship in Christchurch, with Alex Marshall, Paul Foster and Ronnie Duncan.

In 2013, he won the Hong Kong International Bowls Classic pairs title with Robert Grant and he also won the gold medal at the 2015 World Cup Singles in Warilla, New South Wales, Australia and in 2014 he became the World Singles Champion of Champions defeating Fairus Jabal of Malaysia in the final.

He won the singles at the Scottish National Bowls Championships (the Roseberry Trophy) in both 2013 and 2015, when bowling for Blackwood Victoria BC.

In 2022, he competed in the men's singles and the men's triples at the 2022 Commonwealth Games. After winning his singles section he went on to win the bronze medal play off defeating Fairul Izwan Abd Muin.

In 2023, he was selected as part of the team to represent Scotland at the 2023 World Outdoor Bowls Championship. He participated in the men's singles and the men's pairs events. In the pairs with Jason Banks, they won their group undefeated but were then knocked out in the quarter finals by Australia and one week later in the singles, he won a bronze medal after reaching the semi final stage, where he lost to Ryan Bester.

In 2024, McLean won his third national singles title, which equalled the all-time record of four other bowlers, Robert Sprot, David Dall, Joseph Black and Darren Burnett. Later that year in November, McLean won the Hong Kong International Bowls Classic singles and pairs events (the latter with Darren Gualtieri). The following year in 2025, McLean won his fourth national singles title to set an all-time record.

== County, national and world honours ==
Outdoor representing Blackwood Victoria BC

- World Singles Champion of Champions 2014, 2026
- Scottish Singles Champion 2013, 2015, 2024, 2025 and 2026
- Lanarkshire Singles Championship 2012, 2014, 2015, 2016 & 2023
- Lanarkshire Champion of Champions 2004, 2011, 2012, 2014, 2015, 2018 & 2023
- Scottish Junior Singles Champion 2002 & 2007

Indoor representing Blantyre MW

- SIBA Junior Singles Champion 2007
- SIBA Mixed Pairs Champion 2024
- SIBA 2 Bowl Pairs Champion 2009 & 2023
- SIBA Singles Champion 2007, 2012 & 2014
- SIBA Triples Champion 2011, 2014, 2020, 2022 & 2025
- SIBA Fours Champion 2006, 2017, 2022 & 2023
- BIBC Singles Champion 2007
- BIBC Triples Champion 2012 & 2022
