= Matt Le Ber =

Guernsey lawn bowler

Personal information
- Nationality: British (Guernsey)
- Born: 17 September 1984 (age 41) Guernsey

Sport
- Sport: Lawn bowls
- Club: Vale Recreation BC
Medal record
Representing Guernsey
Atlantic Bowls Championships
| Silver medal – second place | 2007 Ayr | singles |
British Isles Championships
| Gold medal – first place | 2005 | pairs |
| Gold medal – first place | 2013 | fours |
| Gold medal – first place | 2016 | triples |
European Championships
| Gold medal – first place | 2017 Jersey | pairs |
| Silver medal – second place | 2017 Jersey | team |
| Gold medal – first place | 2019 Guernsey | mixed four |
| Gold medal – first place | 2019 Guernsey | team |

Matthew Len Le Ber (born 1984) is an international lawn bowler from Guernsey.

== Bowls career ==
He made his international debut in 2001 and represented Guernsey at four Commonwealth Games; in the singles at the 2006 Commonwealth Games & 2010 Commonwealth Games, in the singles and triples at the 2014 Commonwealth Games and the pairs at the 2018 Commonwealth Games.

He is a three times British champion winning the 2005 pairs, 2013 fours and 2016 triples at the British Isles Bowls Championships.

In 2007, he won the singles silver medal at the Atlantic Bowls Championships and in 2017 won gold and silver medals at the European Bowls Championships. Two years later in 2019, he won two gold medals at the same Championships.

== Personal life ==
He is an accounts administrator by trade and his father is Len Le Ber (another bowls international).
