= Billy Hay (bowls) =

Scottish international lawn bowler

Willie Hay
Personal information
- Nationality: British (Scottish)
- Born: c.1963
- Died: 28 August 2015

Sport
- Sport: Lawn and indoor bowls
- Club: Oban BC

William "Billy" Hay (c.1963 – 28 August 2015) was an international lawn bowler from Scotland who competed at the Commonwealth Games.

== Biography ==
Hay was a member of the Oban Bowls Club. He made his international debut for Scotland in 1991 and played in the Home Internationals for the next eight years.

Hay represented the Scottish team at the 1994 Commonwealth Games in Victoria, Canada, where he competed in the fours event, with Willie Wood, Ian Laird and Garry Hood. Hay was able to travel to the Games following his company CalMac allowing him time off and the subsequent story in the Oban Times which raised awareness to the need for funds. The local community came together to provide the funds.

He was twice the runner-up of Scotland at the Scottish National Bowls Championships, in the 1995 singles and the 1993 pairs. In 1994 he bowled for Oban in the final of the MacEwan Cup.
