= Leon Stanfield =

British lawn bowler (b.1934)

Personal information
- Nationality: British (Welsh)
- Born: 18 June 1934 Merthyr Tydfil, Wales
- Education: Swansea University
- Occupation: Teacher
- Years active: 1950-2008

Sport
- Sport: Lawn bowls
- Club: Bodmin BC; Troedyrhiw BC
Medal record
Representing Wales
British Isles Championships
Gold medal – first place	1966	singles

James Leon Stanfield (born 18 June 1934) is a former Welsh international lawn bowler.

== Biography ==
Stanfield became the British singles champion after winning the British Isles Bowls Championships in 1966.

Stanfield bowled for Bodmin Bowls Club and represented Cornwall ten times in Middleton Cup games.

He was a teacher by trade and in 1960 he was working at Bodmin Grammar School and married Catherine Betty Langman. He was active in politics for much of his life. He was Secretary of the Bodmin Labour Party in the early 1960s and also served as Secretary for the Bodmin Hockey Club.

In 1966 he left Cornwall for Wales and became Secretary for the Troedyrhiw Bowls Club. In 1977 he won the Welsh Indoor Championship.

He served as councillor on Merthyr Tydfil Borough Council for many years and one of his achievements is helping to set up the Brecon Mountain Steam Railway.
