= Colin Best (bowls) =

Irish lawn bowler

Personal information
- Nationality: Northern Irish

Sport
- Club: Willowfield BC
Medal record
Representing combined Ireland
British Isles Championships
Gold medal – first place	1994	singles

Colin Best is an Irish international lawn bowler and former British champion.

== Bowls career ==
Best won the Irish National Bowls Championships singles in 1993 and subsequently won the singles at the British Isles Bowls Championships in 1994.
