= Gean O'Neil =

Jersey bowls player (1951–2018)

Personal information
- Nationality: British (Jersey)
- Born: 9 February 1951
- Died: 4 October 2019 (aged 68)

Sport
- Club: Jersey BC
Medal record
Representing Jersey
World Outdoor Championships
Silver medal – second place	2004 Leamington Spa	fours
Atlantic Bowls Championships
Bronze medal – third place	2005 Bangor	singles
Bronze medal – third place	2005 Bangor	triples
British Isles Championships
Gold medal – first place	2004	pairs
Gold medal – first place	2009	fours
Gold medal – first place	2013	fours

Gean Pamela O'Neil (1951-2018) was an international lawn and indoor bowler representing Jersey.

== Bowls career ==
Gean was part of the fours team with Christine Grimes, Suzie Dingle and Karina Bisson that won the silver medal at the 2004 World Outdoor Bowls Championship in Leamington Spa.

In 2005 she won the singles and triples bronze medals at the Atlantic Bowls Championships.

O'Neil is a three times British champion after winning the 2004 pairs and the fours titles in 2009 and 2013, at the British Isles Bowls Championships.
