= Jim Kerr (bowls) =

Scottish lawn bowler

Personal information
- Nationality: British (Scottish)
- Born: Scotland

Sport
- Sport: Lawn bowls
- Club: Merchiston Edinburgh BC
Medal record
Representing Scotland
National Championships
Gold medal – first place	1956	pairs

Jim Kerr was a Scottish international lawn bowler who competed at the British Empire and Commonwealth Games (now Commonwealth Games).

== Biography ==
Kerr was a member of the Merchiston Edinburgh Bowling Club and was part of the Merchiston Edinburgh pair with David Smart, that won the District finals to qualify for the 1956 Scottish National Bowls Championships, where they then won the national pairs title.

He represented the 1958 Scottish team at the 1958 British Empire and Commonwealth Games in Cardiff, Wales, where he participated in the pairs event, again with David Smart.

In 1961, Kerr was still actively playing bowls and represented Edinburgh and Leith at regional level.
