= Margaret Russell (bowls) =

Scottish international lawn bowler

Personal information
- Nationality: British (Scottish)
- Born: 3 December 1944 (age 81)

Sport
- Sport: Lawn and indoor bowls
- Club: Livingston Letham BC
Medal record
Representing Scotland
British Isles Championships
Gold medal – first place	1997	pairs
Scottish Nationals
Gold medal – first place	1996	pairs
Gold medal – first place	1999	fours

Margaret Russell (born 3 December 1944) is a former international lawn bowler from Scotland who competed at the Commonwealth Games.

== Biography ==
Russell was a member of the Livingston Letham Bowls Club and represented Scotland at international level from 1998 to 2009.

Russell represented the Scottish team at the 2002 Commonwealth Games in Manchester, England, where she competed in the pairs event, with Joyce Lindores.

She was the pairs champion of Scotland at the 1996 Scottish National Bowls Championships and the fours champion in 1999. She subsequently qualified to represent Scotland at the British Isles Bowls Championships, winning the pairs title with Ann Clark in 1997.
