= Malcolm De Sousa =

Jersey bowls player (born 1991)

Personal information
- Nationality: British (Jersey)
- Born: 12 July 1991 (age 35) Jersey

Sport
- Sport: Lawn bowls
- Club: Sun BC
Medal record
Representing Jersey
Atlantic Bowls Championships
Bronze medal – third place	2011 Paphos	singles
Bronze medal – third place	2011 Paphos	pairs
Silver medal – second place	2019 Cardiff	fours
British Isles Championships
Gold medal – first place	2016	fours
Gold medal – first place	2019	pairs
Gold medal – first place	2023	pairs

Malcolm De Sousa (born 12 July 1991) is an international bowls player from Jersey.

== Bowls career ==
De Sousa represented Jersey at the 2010 Commonwealth Games, the 2014 Commonwealth Games and the 2018 Commonwealth Games

In 2011 he won singles and pairs bronze medals at the Atlantic Bowls Championships and in 2019 he won the fours silver medal at the Atlantic Bowls Championships.

De Sousa has won two British titles, winning the fours in 2016 and pairs in 2019 at the British Isles Bowls Championships. In 2020 he was selected for the 2020 World Outdoor Bowls Championship in Australia.

In October 2021, De Sousa was selected to represent Jersey in the 2022 Commonwealth Games being held in Birmingham. He duly competed in the men's triples and the men's fours at the 2022 Commonwealth Games.

In 2023, he won the pairs title for the second time, with Ross Davis at the British Isles Bowls Championships, held in Ayr. Later in 2023, he was selected as part of the team to represent Jersey at the 2023 World Outdoor Bowls Championship. He participated in the men's singles and the men's pairs events.

Having been selected for his fifth Commonwealth Games, De Sousa was Jersey's flagbearer at the opening ceremony of the 2026 edition in Glasgow, Scotland.
