= Scottish National Bowls Championships =

Lawn bowls competitions

Tournament information
- Sport: Lawn bowls
- Location: Scotland
- Established: 1893
- Administrator: Bowls Scotland
- Website: Bowls Scotland

The Scottish National Bowls Championships is one of the oldest bowls competitions in the world. In 1892, James Brown of Sanquhar Bowling Club and Dr Clark of the Partick Bowling Club formed the Scottish Bowls Association and organised the first rink (fours) championship the following year at the Queen's Park Bowling Club, Glasgow (it was the first national championships and was known as the McEwan Cup).

The first men's singles winner (for the Roseberry Trophy) was George Sprot and his son Bob Sprot was a three-time champion and the first gold medal singles champion at the Commonwealth Games for Scotland.

The championships are organised by Bowls Scotland.

== Past winners ==
=== Men's events ===
==== Singles (Roseberry Trophy) ====
Year	Champion	Runner-up	Ref
1894	George Sprot (Wishaw)	G. McCulloch (Queen's Park, Glasgow)	
1895	J. S. Henderson (Dollar)	T Forrest (Queen's Park, Glasgow)	
1896	George Sprot (Wishaw)	T. Harvey (West End, Edinburgh)	
1897	A. Johnstone (Troon)	W. A. Russell (Carluke)	
1898	William Blackwood (New Cumnock)	J. Mitchell (Bonnybridge)	
1899	Thomas Dickie (Hutchesontown, Glasgow)	William Aird (Burnbank, Glasgow)	
1900	Thomas Allan (Kelso)	A. Hopkins (Galston)	
1901	W. Law (Kilbirnie)	A. Wilson (Rock, Dumbarton)	
1902	A. Wilson (Rock, Dumbarton)	A. Black (Rankinston)	
1903	James Brown, Jnr. (Blantyre)	A. Corbett (Wellcroft, Glasgow)	
1904	J. McNaughton (Camelon, Falkirk)	Thomas Muir (Beith)	
1905	James Aitken (West End, Edinburgh)	Charles Newall (Grosvenor, Greenock)	
1906	Thomas Logan (Whitevale Glasgow)	Alaxander Goldie (Springhill, Kilmarnock)	
1907	Dr J. D. Robson (Maxwelltown, Dumfries)	R Douglas (Stirling)	
1908	William Blackwood (New Cumnock)	W. Brownlie (East Kilbride)	
1909	Tom Wilson (Pollokshaws, Glasgow)	Samuel Niven (Stenhousemuir)	
1910	Robert Sprot (Wishaw)	W. Minford (Hurlford)	
1911	A. Goldie (Hurlford)	W. Armstrong (Alva)	
1912	John Dunsire (Buckhaven)	Aandrew Carmichael (Aidrian, Falkirk)	
1913	John McGhee (Coatbridge)	W. M. Anderson (Grangemouth)	
1914	D. Park (New Cumnock)	J. Mcintosh (Newbattle)	
1915–1918 not held due to World War I
1919	M. Hannah (Lady Alice, Greenock)	William Scouller (Corstorphine, Edinburgh)	
1920	Robert Sprot (Wishaw)	William Scouller (Corstorphine, Edinburgh)	
1921	James Brown, Jnr. (Hamilton)	William Blackwood (New Cumnock)	
1922	William Scouller (Corstorphine, Edinburgh)	J. C. Irving (Lockerbie)	
1923	William Scouller (Corstorphine, Edinburgh)	J. C. Irving (Lockerbie)	
1924	W. Hunter (Leven)	T. Bell (Lochmaben)	
1925	Thomas Duff (Airdrie)	R. S. Wallace (Earlston)	
1926	W. Blue (Caledonia, Paisley)	E. S. Gauld (Whitehall, Aberdeen)	
1927	R. H. Jamieson (Marchmount, Dumfries)	Robert Sprot (Wishaw)	
1928	Peter Craig (West End, Edinburgh)	John Russell (Bishopbriggs, Glasgow)	
1929	Robert Sprot (Wishaw)	A. S. Pearson (Victoria, Greenock)	
1930	John Cowie (Carron and Carronshore)	W. Templeton (Giffnock)	
1931	Peter Brown (Udston, Hamilton)	H. Smith (Elgin)	
1932	Walter Wilson (Scotstounhill, Glasgow)	R. S. Park (Ardeer Iron Works)	
1933	R. Banks (Irvine Winton)	C. Monteith (Kirkconnel)	
1934	J. Kyle (Strathaven)	D. Fairbairn (Lauder)	
1935	A. Clark (Dumbarton)	J.C. Irving (Lockerbie)	
1936	T Agnew (Ayr Hawkhill)	D. L. Brown (Chryston, Glasgow)	
1937	Allan Stewart (Lilybank, Johnstone)	Junor J,. Watt (Kittybrewster & Woodside, Aberdeen)	
1938	J. C. Irving (Lockerbie)	G. Goldie (Kilmarnock)	
1939	D. Miller (Leven)	J. Rae (Caldercraig)	
1940	John Young (Weir's Recreation, Glasgow)	W Arthur (Barrhead)	
1941	Adam Dougall (Kirkhill, Glasgow)	Charlie Miller (St. Vincent, Glasgow)	
1942	W. Cunningham (Dreghorn, Ayrshire)	Bob Kissach (Burnbank, Glasgow)	
1943	David Dall (Blantyre Welfare)	A. McGuinness (Stewart and Lloyd's, Coatbridge)	
1944	David Dall (Blantyre Welfare)	Bob Kissach (Burnbank, Glasgow)	
1945	Jimmy Irving (Lockerbie)	J. A. Goodall (Kirkhill, Glasgow)	
1946	Adam Dougall (Kirkhill, Glasgow)	G. Roger (Uphall Works)	
1947	W. Cunningham (Dreghorn)	J. D. Easton (Priorscroft, Paisley)	
1948	James Barclay (Strathmore Coupar, Angus)	W. J. Smith (Burnside, Glasgow)	
1949	David Dall (Blantyre Welfare)	A. Robertson (Bowhill Institute)	
1950	Jimmy Irving (Lockerbie)	J. Walker (Balfron)	
1951	Norman Campbell (Spittalmyre, Stirling)	D. Stewart (Almond Valley)	
1952	Jimmy Irving (Lockerbie)	John Bradbury (Denny)	
1953	Bob Kissach (Bumbank, Glasgow)	J. Hamilton (Hamilton)	
1954	Bob Crombie (Leslie)	W. Nelson (Harthill)	
1955	Mark Allan (Hamilton Caledonian)	Norman Campbell (Spittalmyre, Stirling)	
1956	C. Grant (Bridgeness and Carriden)	J. Gillespie (Neilston)	
1957	William Downes Jones (Ardrossan)	Andrew Main (Lundin Links)	
1958	Joseph Black (Sanquhar)	J. Paterson (Linwood, Paisley)	
1959	Joseph Black (Sanquhar)	W. Munro (Crosshill)	
1960	A. Brown (Tulliallan)	W. F. Mair (Postal, Edinburgh)	
1961	Ernest Johnson (Dumbarton)	Jacky Forrest (Balerno, Edinburgh)	
1962	Joseph Black (Sanquhar)	A. Marshall (St. Andrews)	
1963	Willie Adrain (Dreghorn)	Willie Smith (Galston, L.W.M.)	
1964	Billy Gibb (Bothwell)	W. Muirhead (Uphall Works)	
1965	John Hershaw (Ardeer Recreation)	J. Hurst (Pilrig, Edinburgh)	
1966	John Hershaw (Ardeer Recreation)	Dick Bernard (Gorebridge)	
1967	William E. Wood Sr. (Gifford)	J. Amos (Camelon, Falkirk)	
1968	John Lamont (Kirn & Hunters Quay)	Duncan McGregor (Victoria Park, Glasgow)	
1969	Bob Motroni (Dumfries)	D. Murray (Lenzie)	
1970	Dick Bernard (Gorebridge)	Willie Wood (Gifford)	
1971	John McAra (Wishaw, South)	David Connell (Dunaskin Doon)	
1972	Andrew Binnie (Mayfield, Edinburgh)	Archie Potts (Maxwelltown, Dumfries)	
1973	Roy White (Sanquhar)	John Slight (Newbattle)	
1974	John Fleming (Mauchline)	Willie Bone (Methilhill)	
1975	Jim McLagan (Methil)	Ian McCowan (Caledonia, Paisley)	
1976	David McGill, jnr (Sighthill, Edinburgh)	George Adrain (Dreghorn)	
1977	John Milgrew (Springhill, Kilmarnock)	Bob Burnett (Ardeer Recreation)	
1978	Harry Reston (Deans)	Jim Oliver (Macmerry)	
1979	Norrie Amos (Buccleuch, Hawick)	Peter Clark (Wellington Park, Greenock)	
1980	Jim Farrow (Cumnock)	Allan Noon (Bridge of Weir)	
1981	Fraser Muirhead (Uphall Station)	Dave McPherson (Oakley M.W.)	
1982	Brian Rattray (Alva)	Willie Paul (Tanfield, Edinburgh)	
1983	John Campbell (Alloa)	Alistair Will (Maud)	
1984	Willie Paul (Tanfield, Edinburgh)	Alec O'Hare (Cambusbarron)	
1985	Willie McLaughlin (Lesmahagow)	Tommy Trotter (Colinton, Edinburgh)	
1986	Angus Blair (Haddington)	Brian Sinclair (Anchor, Paisley)	
1987	Graham Robertson (Tranent)	John Moyes (Dunfermline)	
1988	John Aitken (Kirkliston)	Doug Fletcher (Stenhousemuir)	
1989	Colin Rae (Wilton, Hawick)	Graham Barclay (Stamperland, Clarkston)	
1990	Simon Thomson (Adrian, Falkirk)	Steven Thomson (Prestonpans - Castlepark)	
1991	George Sneddon (Broxburn)	Derek McClue (Glasnock Valley)	
1992	Robert Provan (Airdrie)	David Peacock (Danderhall M.W.)	
1993	George Whitelaw (Storehouse)	Brian Rattray (Alva)	
1994	Colin Peacock (Marchmount, Dumfries)	Jim McGuire (Lochgelly)	
1995	Graeme Archer (Sighthill Edinburgh)	Billy Hay (Oban)	
1996	Pat McNally (Earlston)	Jim Byron (Westermains, Kirkintilloch)	
1997	David Gourlay Jr. (Annbank)	Sandy Deans (Polmaise)	
1998	Raymond Logan (Kirkliston)	Willie Wood MBE (Gifford)	
1999	Darren Burnett (Lochlands, Arbroath)	David Peacock (Danderhall M.W.)	
2000	John McCrorie (Tranent)	William Francis (Fauldhouse)	
2001	George Prosser (Douglas Victoria)	George Adrain (Dreghorn)	
2002	Darren Burnett (Lochlands, Arbroath)	Steven Glen (Ormiston)	
2003	David Anderson (New Deer Turriff)	Stephen Conchar (Castle Douglas)	
2004	Paul Foster (Troon Portland)	Willie Wood MBE (Gifford)	
2005	Darren Burnett (Lochlands, Arbroath)	John Docherty (Burnbank, Hamilton)	
2006	Billy Mellors (Goldenacre)	Craig England (Northfield)	
2007	Sandy Wotherspoon (Port Glasgow)	Ross Carlin (Muirhead & Birkhill)	
2008	Wayne Hogg (Markinch)	Sandy Wotherspoon (Port Glasgow)	
2009	Alister Reid (Seafield, Ayr)	Scott Mackintosh (London Road Foundry)	
2010	Jonathan Ross (Priorscroft)	Robert Marshall (Slateford)	
2011	Mark Kelsey (Rutherglen)	Alan McKay (Westhill)	
2012	Alastair White (Kelso)	Kevin Bain (Hyndland)	
2013	Iain McLean (Blackwood Victoria)	Ian Murray (Turriff)	
2014	Kevin Anderson (Dumbarton)	Alan Gray (Eaglesham)	
2015	Iain McLean (Blackwood Victoria)	Stuart Bebbington (Ayton)	
2016	Derek Oliver (Cockenzie & Port Seton)	John Strachan (Houldsworth)	
2017	Martyn Rice (Dumfries)	Billy Mellors (Haddington)	
2018	Mark O'Hagan (Whitefield)	Craig Adrain (Irvine Park)	
2019	Gordon White (Aberlady)	Martyn Rice (Dumfries)	
2020 and 2021 cancelled due to COVID-19 pandemic
2022	Darren Gualtieri (Hyndland)	Mark Kelsey (Rutherglen)	
2023	Alastair White (Jedburgh)	Alan Gray (Eaglesham)	
2024	Iain McLean (Blackwood Victoria)	Graeme Hume (Townholm)	
2025	Iain McLean (Blackwood Victoria)	Steven Fleming (Buchan Park)	

==== Most singles titles ====
Name	Titles	Year
Iain McLean	5	2013, 2015, 2024, 2025, 2026
Robert Sprot	3	1910, 1920 1929
David Dall	3	1943, 1944, 1949
Joseph Black	3	1958, 1959, 1962
Darren Burnett	3	1999, 2002, 2005

==== Pairs ====
Year	Champion	Runner-Up	Ref
1933	Alex Niven & George Niven (Abbotsford Galashiels)	H. McGinley & A. Stewart (Lilybank Johnston)	
1934	R. Noble & R. Fordyce (Juniper Green Edinburgh)	J. Love & William Lowe (Musselburgh)	
1935	J. Sharp & D. Dunlop (Gourock)	R. Todd & A Coltherd (Thornhill Dumfriesshire)	
1936	T. Campbell & A. J. Smith (Lenzie)	J. Park & Robert Park (Lochmaben)	
1937	T. Clark & R. Gray (New Cumnock)	J. G. Gow & R. Fordyce (Juniper Green Edinburgh)	
1938	T. Samuel & Jacky Forrest (Balerno, Edinburgh)	B. Black & R. Howie (Kilwinning)	
1939	T. McCaughie & W. M. Reid (Cumnock)	J. Graham & J. Bell (Westermains)	
1940	J. Wood & W. McKinlay (Lochwinnoch)	R. Watson & D. Currie (New Cumnock)	
1941	J. Mullet & A. Pettigrew (Halfway and District Cambuslang)	J. McIntyre & J. Arrol (Garelochhead)	
1942	J. Mitchell & W. Square (Linthouse Glasgow)	G. Burns & W. Beath (Kilsyth)	
1943	C. Greenhorn & R. McKendrick (Forth and Wilsontown)	R.Phillips & J. Stalker (Milngavie)	
1944	G. Adams & W. Ferguson (Maxwellton Dumfries)	J. Nelson & H. Muir (Kilwinning)	
1945	T. Park & R. Scott (Sanquhar)	J. Paterson & D. Craig (Douglas Water M.W)	
1946	A. Frame & Tom Bell (Hamilton)	W. Bell & S. Cairns (Maxwelltown Dumfries)	
1947	T. Ure & J. Gray (Auchengeich Welfare)	W. Smith & J. T. Buchanan (Burnside Glasgow)	
1948	Jock McAtee & J. Thomson (Catrine)	T. Adrian & J. R. Young (Irvine Winton)	
1949	J. A. Haddow & J. Haddow (Sanquhar)	J. Greenhorn & R. McKendrick (Forth and Wilsontown)	
1950	W Elliot & E Winning (Catrine)	J. Clark & J. V. Crichion (Edzell)	
1951	A. Young & R. Morton (Wattfield Ayr)	J. L. Laverick & A. Henderson (Coltbridge Edinburgh)	
1952	J. McKay & A. Watson (Maitland Edinburgh)	W. McBlane & Q. McBlane (Glengarnock I W)	
1953	D. Downie & G. Downie (Udston Hamilton)	R. Gordon & J. McBain (The Inverness)	
1954	Bob Simpson & Bob Dalgleish (Glasgow Transport)	W. Brown & W. Fordyce & (Juniper Green Edinburgh)	
1955	N. Cocoran & A. Lyle (Burnbank Glasgow)	D. Smith & A. McMillan (Troon)	
1956	Jim Kerr & David Smart (Merchiston Edinburgh)	A. Downie & David Dall (Blantyre Welfare)	
1957	G. Pollock & R. McCall (Kilmarnock)	J. W. Campbell & A. J. Finlayson (Woodend Glasgow)	
1958	C. Haig & G. McQueen (Rosslyn)	D. Martin & D. McGilvery (Westermains Kirkintilloch)	
1959	J. Adams & J. R. Bradbury (Denny)	J Alexander & Harry Reston (Seafield Bathgate)	
1960	Michael Purdon & Thomas Hamill (Rankin Park Greenock)	A. Mackie & J. Weir (Lundin Links)	
1961	Alan Whyte & William McGregor (J. G. Fleming Houston)	L. Primrose & R. B. Jackson (Queen's Park Glasgow)	
1962	J. Clark & R. Clark (Lesmahagow)	A. McCall & J. Stewart (Denbeath)	
1963	Don Crichton & William Sommerville (Errol)	J. Russell & G. Innes (Hillpark Glasgow)	
1964	L. Lang & J. Weir (Lenzie)	A. Black & J. Byres (Clarkston Glasgow)	
1965	N. Rogerson & Bob Motroni (Dumfries)	W. McMillan & R. Thomson (Deans Livingston Station)	
1966	J. Arthur & T. Trotter (Campsie Lennoxtown)	J. Clark & J. Kissach (Partickhill Glasgow)	
1967	J. Wilson & G. Caruthers (Abbotsford Galashiels)	R. Donaldson & C. McDonald (Rattray Blairgowrie)	
1968	Alex Henderson & Bill Scott (Craigentinny, Edinburgh)	A. Rankin & M. Hailstones (Armadale)	
1969	Jimmy McIntyre & Willie Moore (Dreghorn)	George Clark & Andrew McJimsey (Elphinstone)	
1970	A. Stuart & R. Graham (Abergeldie, Aberdeen)	Jacky Forrest & Willie Dyet (Balerno, Edinburgh)	
1971	Sammy Mackay & Willie Milne (Dalmuir)	John Renwick & Donald Macleod (Wilton Hawick)	
1972	Jacky Forrest & Willie Dyet (Balerno, Edinburgh)	W. Stewart & J. Stewart (Wellington Park Greenock)	
1973	Norrie Pryde & Alex McIntosh (Newbattle)	Mark Young & Bob McCrorie (Newmilns)	
1974	Eddie Robertson & Joe Robertson (Foxley Glasgow)	J. Whiteford & D. McGeoch (Kirkcowan)	
1975	George Palmer & John McFarlane (Elderslie Wallace)	Jim Allardyce & Jim McAra (Wishaw South)	
1976	Billy Cathcart & Donald Anderson (Bellahouston Glasgow)	T. Robertson & R. Gillon (Ladybank)	
1977	T. Beattie & T. Linton (Lockerbie)	J. McDonald A. J. Garrow (Forres)	
1978	Angus Middleton & Willie Whiteford (Rothesay)	N. Cameron & A. Campbell (Cumbernauld)	
1979	Ronald Cass & Neil Currie (Annan)	Willie McLaughlin & Jim Morris (Lesmahagow)	
1980	R. Cunningham & L. Plenderleith (Coldstream)	S. Melkie & Raymond Logan (Kirkliston)	
1981	Allan Mackillop & Harry Smith (Bogleha')	J. Anderson & J. McGrandle (Rock Dumbarton)	
1982	Eddie Hamilton & Frank Hamilton (Thornliebank Glasgow)	Eric Halliday & Willie Gallacher (Anniesland Glasgow)	
1983	Willie Quigley & Peter Clark (Wellington Park Greenock)	Carmyle Glasgow	
1984	J. Young & D. McPherson (Oakley Miners' Welfare)	Andrew Rennie & Alistair Will (Maud)	
1985	Alex McIntosh & Colin Cook (Newbattle)	W. Muir & A. Ballantyne (East Lothian Co op Tranent)	
1986	Jock Brodie & Jackie Greenwood (Alberlady)	Hugh Wilson & Willie Harkness (Glengowan Caldercruix)	
1987	Ian Mclelland & Davie Barr (Springburn Glasgow)	Hugh MacRae & George Mcleod (Highland Inverness)	
1988	John White & Angus Blair (Haddington)	B. Toner & K. Coates (Tollcross Glasgow)	
1989	Gordon Wilson & Tommy Johnston (Winchburgh)	David Smeaton & Bobby Dick (Duffus Park Cupar)	
1990	Ian Emslie & Alistair Will (Maud)	Ken Dobson & Ian Todd (Grangemouth)	
1991	George McLeod & Val Hendry (Granite City, Aberdeen)	Andy Thomson & Willie Wyles (Methil)	
1992	George Ross & Richard Corsie (Craigentinny, Edinburgh)	Jim Murdoch & Ronnie Lawrie (Prestwick)	
1993	Robert Grant & Alex Grant (Overtown & Waterloo)	John Jackson & Billy Hay (Oban)	
1994	Malcolm Mitchell & Graeme Campbell (Maybole Prestonpans)	John Thomson & Jim Pringle (Castlepark)	
1995	Alec Allan & Ian Robertson (Newbridge)	Alan McGuiness & Jim Purves (Caldercraig)	
1996	Alan Gilmour & Gary Mackie (Kirkcaldy West End)	Alex Letham & Andy McRae (Bothwell)	
1997	Gordon Coppard & George Adrain (Dreghorn)	Wallace Stevenson & Robin Higgins (Stranraer)	
1998	Tom O'Hara & John Keir (Prestwick)	David Anderson & David Wardrop (Pumpherston)	
1999	Alan Brown & Peter Wilson (Gorgie Mills Edinburgh)	Ormond Black & Allan Goldie (Crosshouse)	
2000	Brian Jessiman & Derek Logan (Inverurie)	Freddie Kimmens & Brian McAlees (Port Glasgow)	
2001	Willie Rankin & Davie Greig (Kingswood Glasgow)	David Linton & Ray Graham (Lockerbie)	
2002	George Adrain & Frank McCartney (Dreghorn)	West Barns Dunbar	
2003	Lee Haldane & Ian Crowford (Melrose)	Raymond Mearns & John Thain (Keith)	
2004	George Sneddon & Keith Tait (Helensburgh)	Slateford Edinburgh	
2005	Gordon Nelson & Graeme Campbell (Newton Park Ayr)	David Peacock & Henry Aitchison (Danderhall)	
2006	Willie Wood & Brian Bissett (Gifford)	Darren Hush & Colin Mitchell (Carrick Knowe)	
2007	Paul Foster & Barry Nixon (Troon Portland)	Blacklands	
2008	Darren Hush & James Hogg (Carrick Knowe)	John Tait & John Seaton (Maidens)	
2009	Davy Ross & Sandy McDougall (Glenmavis, Bathgate)	Alec Thompson & Graeme McIntosh (Tanfield)	
2010	David Fisher & Steven Fisher (Anchor)	Blantyre	
2011	Mark McLees & Stephan McLellan (Wellington Park)	Gifford	
2012	Darren McKenny & Chris Steven (Pilrig)	Callum Taggart & Alistair Greer (Hyndland)	
2013	Billy Mellors & Alister Kennedy (West Barns)	C Ramsay & M Thomson (Dudhope)	
2014	Johnnie McLean & James Anderson (Campbeltown)	Colin Howie & Paul Foster (Troon Portland)	
2015	Jim Bonnar & Brian Young (Tranent)	Brian Kyle & Alan Hainey (West End Stranraer)	
2016	Richard Wright & Brian Gwynne (Mount Vernon)	Strathmiglo	
2017	Nan Reynolds & Peter Jones (Houldsworth)	Fairfield	
2018	Sandy Wotherspoon & John Fleming (Port Glasgow)	Darren Weir & Andrew Weir (Prestwick)	
2019	Steven Shields & Stewart Anderson (Eddlewood)	Robert Allan Jr. & Stuart Wilson (Clackmannan)	
2020 & 2021 cancelled due to COVID-19 pandemic
2022	James Burnett & Sam Gray (Prestongrange)	Stephen Ralph & Alan Barrie (Kirkintilloch)	
2023	Steven Borthwick & Ryan Gualtieri (Hyndland)	Alan Gourly & Andrew McFarlane (Eastfield)	
2024	Kevin Donaldson & Stuart White, (Gordon)	Malky Thom & Steve McNally (Hillside)	
2025	Colin Howie & Paul Foster MBE (Troon Portland)	Robert Menzies Jnr & Steven Scott (Bogleha)	

==== Triples (Cockburn Trophy ====
Year	Champion	Runner-Up	Ref
1971	Douglas McKie, William McKie, R McRoberts (Dalmellington)	Blacklandmill	
1972	G. Weatherhead, J.McBride, A. P. Morton (Linthouse)	Craigmore Rothesay	
1973	Robert Fowlds, Alex Greig, Peter Ball (Blackburn, West Lothian)	Glasgow Police	
1974	George Adrain, Alec McCartney, Robert Bennie (Dreghorn)	Spittal	
1975	D Munro, W Swanston, P McNally (Brechin)	Beechgrove Moffat	
1976	Joe Bain, Jim Halliday, Willie Halliday (Whitburn)	Castlehill Colliery	
1977	D McLaren, W McPherson, B Petrie (Meikieriggs)	Yarrow Recreation	
1978	Jim Hayes, Jim Clelland, Joe Robertson (Foxley)	Beechgrove Moffat	
1979	W. Campbell, R. Louden, T. Dudgeon (Foxley)	Brock Dumbarton	
1980	Bob Mitchell, Andy Hislop, John Thomson (Kingswood)	Whitburn	
1981	F Gormill, D Christie, Bob Forrest (Overtown and Waterloo)	Strathaven	
1982	F Gormil, D Christie, Bob Forrest (Overtown and Waterloo)	Wellmeadow Paisley	
1983	Ian Murray, Robbie Sangster, Frankie Slater (Turriff)	Dreghorn	
1984	Findley, W. Penman, J. Marnoch (Glenrothes)	Sighthill	
1985	Roy Fulton, Jock McAtee, Les Fowler (Catrine)	Dunbar	
1986	John Eastop, Billy Forrester, Willie Ross (Mount Florida)	Fenwick	
1987	Michael Blackwood, Kevin Middlemiss, Brian Blackwood (Waverley Galashiels)	Glaisnock Valley	
1988	John Douglas, Morris Orr, Derek Pickles (Busby)	Kirkconnel	
1989	Malcolm McNicol, Ross Graham, Graham Laurie (Linlithgow)	Wellington Park	
1990	Alex Hurry, Willie Dyet, Alex Marshall (Gorgie Mills)	Haddington	
1991	A. Hutchinson, P. Canavan, S. Thomson (Adrian)	Forfar	
1992	D Paterson, E Paterson, R Campbell Jr. (Newbridge)	Dalzell	
1993	D. Moore, R. Wilson, P.McCormack (Newmilns)	Tarbolton	
1994	Robert Buddie, Mark McGowan, Andy McIntyre (Houldsworth)	Hawick	
1995	Craig Richmond, Jim Fleming, Garry Hood (Mauchline)	Kirkliston	
1996	Mike Stephen, Gary Simpson, Richie Robinson (Ellon)	Berwick	
1997	Willie Scott, Graham Laurie, Graeme Byrne (Linlithgow)	Edinburgh Northern	
1998	Stewart McMaster, George Sneddon, Jimmy Mallon (Broxburn)	Fenwick	
1999	G Johnston, A Roy, B Elrick (Woodend Aberdeen)	Maryhill	
2000	Jim Florence, Bill Dunleavey, Charlie Greenwood (Aberlady)	Raploch	
2001	David Lugget, Gavin Douglas, Graeme Forsyth (Chirnside)	Tarbolton	
2002	John Johnson, Derek Logie, Jason Williams (Polmaise)	Fauldhouse	
2003	Jim Corrigan, Alan McLean Jr., Brian Sinclair (Anchor Paisley)	Blackwood Victoria	
2004	Scott Duncan, Kevin Hunter, Willie McDonald (Craigentinny, Edinburgh)	Annan	
2005	Alec Higgins, Michael Kelly, David Kelly (Stranraer)	Forehill	
2006	Robert Brown, Graham Thomson, John Docherty (Eddlewood)	Campbeltown	
2007	Ronnie Davidson, Gary Earl, Thomas McCartney (Yoker)	Victoria	
2008	Joe Young, John Bell, Mark McCallum (Clackmannan)	Polmaise	
2009	Keith Shuttleworth, Neil Shuttleworth, Oliver Clingan (New Abbey)	Cockenzie & Port Seton	
2010	Bill McLachlan, Alex Thompson, Graeme McIntosh (Tanfield)	Raploch	
2011	Darren Smith, Gary Nisbet, Andrew Caldwell (Craigentinny)	Port William	
2012	Gary McCann, Scott McInall, Jim McCann (Burnbank Hamilton)	Kirkaldy West End	
2013	Tom Pettigrew, Ryan Crawford, Wayne Hogg (Markinch)	Airdrie Central	
2014	Darren Couper, Paul McAteer, Stuart Hogg (Denny)	Airdrie Central	
2015	Mark Neil, Gary Tait, David Junor (Inverkeithing)	Hyndland	
2016	Kevin Bain, Alistair Greer, Callum Taggart (Hyndland)	Troon Portland	
2017	Brian Salvona, Kevin Boyd & Paul Veitch (Parkside)	Cowdenbeath	
2018	David Comrie, David Comrie, Jamie Cameron (Markinch)	Ayr Seafield	
2019	Grant Hamilton, Cameron Wilson, Drew Boyd (Townholm)	Melrose	
2020 & 2021 cancelled due to COVID-19 pandemic
2022	Steven Guthrie, Francis Leitch & Stuart Gemmell (Auchinleck)	Polmuir	
2023	Derek Hutchison, Connar Robertson, Dylan Robertson (Abbeyview Dunfermline)	Annbank	
2024	Grant Prophet, Calum Willamson, Craig Adrain (Irvine Park)	Airdrie Central	
2025	Peter Thomson, Andy Furye, Darren Burnett (Arbroath)	Tweedmouth	

==== Fours/rinks (McEwan Trophy) ====
Year	Champion	Runner-Up	Ref
1893	J. King, J. Howatson, James Craig, John Niven (Kilwinning)	Carluke	
1894	A. Taylor, James Ferguson, Capt Willison, Bailie Kellie (Kilmarnock London Road)	Pollokshaws	
1895	James Black, James Ferguson, John Ross Jr., Bailie Kellie (Kilmarnock London Road)	Carluke	
1896	Charles Easson, Richard Gibson, John Russell, Tom Frame (Carluke)	Eden Northern	
1897	J. Morgan, J. Wright, A. Haig, R. Richardson (Rosslyn)	Cathcart	
1898	J. W. Robertson, Q. M.Ferguson, R. S. McCubbing, John Paton (Uddingston)	The Edinburgh	
1899	W. C. Callander, Thomas McCrirrick, James Niven, Thomas Douglas (Gala Abbotsford)	Bonnybridge	
1900	(New Cumnock)	Halkshill Largs	
1901	R. Reid, P. Dawson, W. Smith, S. Niven (Stenhousemuir)	Charleston	
1902	John Coulthart, James Little, James Moir, James Christie (Queen's Park)	Carluke	
1903	(Dumbarton)	Darvel	
1904	T. Hutchinson, R. Mather, G. B. Breeze, William Scouller, (Springburn)	Tulliallan	
1905	J. B. Mitchell, G. Paterson, G. Frew, W. C. Laing (Larbert)	Burnbank	
1906	Robert Boyd, John Dow, J. M. Kinnaird, Thomas Douglas (Gala)	Garelochhead	
1907	John Cuthbertson, Alex Dunlop, James Ferguson, John Roberton (Stewarton)	Cathcart	
1908	James Aitken, J. W. Blackley, T. Smith, W. Logan (West End, Edinburgh)	Dunfermline	
1909	Richard Cooke, Alexander Fulton, James Dickie, James Miller (Wellington Park, Greenock)	Newmilns	
1910	J. Jackson, R. Jackson, T. Cochrane, A. F. Thomas (Stonehouse)	Glencairn	
1911	Alex Fullerton, Walter Dalgleish, John Sneddon, William Roxburgh (Titwood)	Milngavie	
1912	James Jack, A. Knox, D. Wilson, James McAlpine (Springhill, Kilmarnock)	Corstorphine	
1913	John Wylie, William Girvan, D.McLeod, H. Richmond (Auchinleck)	Wellmeadow	
1914	A. Cox, R. Risk, Archibald Paterson, James McNaughton (Camelon)	Hamilton	
1915–1918 not held due to World War I
1919	H. Gibson, D. Lowe, J. Love, W. S. Lowe (Musselburgh)	Townhill	
1920	J. Johnstone, A. Cringan, J. Maxwell, J. D. Marchbank (Thornhill)	Wishaw	
1921	J. Pollock, J. Paterson, J. Rae, A. Pettigrew (Halfway and District)	Queen's Park	
1922	W. Smith, W. M. Gilmour, A. Bell, Tom Muir (Beith)	Springboig	
1923	P. Reid, A. Yuille, W. Reid, J. Caldwell (Saltcoats)	Niddrie	
1924	J. Stevenson, D. Gray, A. S. Buchanan, C. Miller (Dalzell)	Coaltown of Wemyss	
1925	J. Eason, G. E. Graham, P. Cook, J. C. Ritchie (Duns)	Colville Park	
1926	J. Hamilton, A. Jenkins, W. Agnew, T. S. Logie (Wellcroft)	Strathaven	
1927	G. Bryce, J. Woods, A. McIlvenna, J. Myles (Shettleston)	Bainsford	
1928	H. Lockhart, D. McIntyre, Lang, J. McCallum (Dumbarton Rock)	Glengowan	
1929	J. Hill, J. Linning, J. McKay, A. Lindsay (Wishaw)	Newmilns	
1930	John Phillips, Richard Gibb, Thomas Wilson, Bryce Morrison (Bishopbriggs)	Alloa East End	
1931	J Waddell Sr., J Trench, D Gray, R Gibb (East Calder)	Dumbarton Rock	
1932	D. Love, J. Smith, W. P. Campbell, W. Farr (Larkhall Miners' Welfare)	Springhill Kilmarnock	
1933	J. Clark, R. Gray, A. Ferguson, H. Lawson (New Cumnock)	Newbattle	
1934	H. Campbell, G. Lauder, T. Carswell, A Dunlop (Victoria Coatbridge)	Stonehouse	
1935	J. Graham, R. Liddell, C. Weir, W. Aitchison (Fauldhouse)	Wishaw	
1936	J. Graham, R. Liddell, C. Weir, W. Aitchison (Fauldhouse)	Newbattle	
1937	John Hampson, T. Caughie, W. McCaughie, J. Penrose (Cumnock)	Bridge of Allan	
1938	J. Ferguson Jr., W. McNeil, R. McRobbie, J. Watson (Hamilton Caledonian)	Dreghorn	
1939	W. Stevenson, J. Lambie, G. Goldie, R. Banks (Kilmarnock)	Titwood	
1940	L. Looker, W. Young, F. C. Rennie, J. Cunningham (Alva South)	Caledonian	
1941	A. Davidson, J. Knox, W. Gardner, A Polson (Abbotsford)	Hyndland	
1942	W. Asher, A. Frew, A. P. Powrie, P. Henderson (Kinnoull, Perth)	Strathaven	
1943	A. Richardson, J. Bell, O. MacKenzie, D. L. Haynes (Lockerbie)	Patons & Baldwin	
1944	A. Richardson, J. Bell, O. MacKenzie, D. L. Haynes (Lockerbie)	Priorscroft	
1945	J. P. Morrison, R. W. Park, A. T. Smith, J. Summers (Strathaven)	Abbotsford	
1946	S. Gillies, J. S Wood, A. G. Mackie, J. Clunie (Lundin Links)	Dumbarton	
1947	A. Gowans, J. H. Gow, E. H. Clark, W. Brown (Juniper Green)	Birkmyre Park	
1948	W. McDonald, R. Short, W. Hazel, R. Russell (Crossgates Miners' Welfare)	Bonnybridge	
1949	G. Morton, R. Crawford, Jimmy McAllister, A. Black (Darvel)	Dalry	
1950	J Mitchell, T Muir, R Baillie, A McCrone (Crosshouse)	Dreghorn	
1951	D. Seaman, J. Pringle, J. Leishman, T. Murray (Twechar M.W.)	Cathcart	
1952	J. Mains, W. B. Wilson, W. C. Fleming, G. Downie (Udston)	Leven	
1953	J. Leich, W. Thorburn, A. Bunyan, R. Glabraith (Galashiels)	Winchburgh	
1954	J. Gourlay, W. Hamilton, W. Douglas, A. Jamieson (Larkhall Welfare)	Chapelhall Welfare	
1955	John Hampson, Thomas Smetherham, George Ferguson, Alexander Hodge (Cumnock)	West Kilbride	
1956	J. Beattie, W. Smith, M. Kenmuir, W. Samson (West Netherton)	Lundin Links	
1957	R. Findlay, R. McKinlay, J. Halliday, S. Stewart (Ayr Cragie)	Townhill	
1958	J. Clark, W. Brown, D. Beattie, R. Clark (Lesmahagow)	Lochgelly	
1959	Andrew Stewart, James Laing, Dave Kirk, Robert Whitehead (Lochgelly)	Charleston	
1960	R. Campbell, J. Mullen, J. Hershaw, Willie Moore (Dreghorn)	Drysdale Recreation	
1961	J. Grandlay, G. Semple, D. MacFarlane, R. Gibb (Bishopbriggs)	Seafield	
1962	T. Winton, T. Lundle, J. Gilbert, F. Glachan (Dalry)	Riverside	
1963	J. O'Donnell, W. Friel, J. McColl, W. McCarroll (Croy)	Kittybrewster and Woodside	
1964	Jacky Forrest, Alex Ross, Laurie McMorran, Willie Dyet (Balerno, Edinburgh)	Campsie	
1965	J. Craig, A. Gardner, R. Archibald, A. Harper (Tulliallan)	Colville Park	
1966	A. Cruickshanks, J. Logan, J. R. Bradbury, J. Adams (Denny)	Burnbank	
1967	S. Renfrew, E. Gibbon, D. Edgar, T. R. Adamson (Mount Florida)	Uphall	
1968	John Slight, David Pearson, Alex McIntosh, Norrie Pryde, (Newbattle)	Maxwelltown	
1969	Jimmy Mess, Charlie Robertson, Willie Allen, George Fisher (Cardonald)	Corstorphine	
1970	I. Campbell, W. Douglas, J. Gladstone, R. G. Virtue (Chirnside)	Queen's Park	
1971	David Beveridge, Jacky Forrest, Laurie McMorran, Willie Dyet (Balerno, Edinburgh)	Whitevale	
1972	A. Nixon, J. Ramsay, Donald Anderson, R. Somerville (Bellahoustan)	Cumnock	
1973	W Blaen, A Gray, J McGinis, J Blaen (Creetown)	Laurieston	
1974	R Thomson, E Thomson, Percy Dickie, G Cowie (Kittybrewster & Woodside)	Kirkconnel	
1975	Larry McMorran, John Summers, Dave Pearson, Willie Dyet (Balerno)	Kirkliston	
1976	A Young, J Grieve, J Adams, J Reekie (Ladybank)	Lochee	
1977	J McNeil, D W Little, T Pearson, W Bell (Prestwick)	Canmore	
1978	Jim Hynd, Willie Hay, Jim Clark, Jim Caldwell (Springhill)	Titwood	
1979	Ian Butler, John Scott, David Currie, Hepburn Milligan (East Linton)	Colville Park	
1980	P McGillvray, A Dickson, P Twatt, Willie Wood (Gifford)	Whitburn	
1981	Jimmy Jack, Jimmy "Bucky" Buchanan, Tommy Summers, David Milne Jr (Singer 1980)	Anniesland	
1982	A Robertson, T Haggerty, J Anderson, R Gibson (Abercon)	Buchan Park	
1983	A. Flood, J. Renfrew, J. Nesbit, Willie Ross, (Mount Florida)	Bridge of Earn	
1984	G Baker, J Cruickshanks, T Johnston, D Boyd (Winchburgh)	West Barns	
1985	Gary Skelton, Graeme Baxter, Duncan Lawson, Peter Coleman (Nethertown)	Gala Galashiels	
1986	Ron Ramsey, Bob Wood, Andrew Ramsay, Bob Marshall (Slateford)	Mearns	
1987	Frank Morrow, Stan Park, Alec Jaffray, Frank Watson (Ferguslie)	Westermains	
1988	K Milne, H Abbott, G Bennett, A Milne (Sauchie)	Kirkliston	
1989	William Watson, Graham Byrne, John Graham, Alan Old (Linlithgow)	The Inverness	
1990	Davie Curran, John Fraser, Sandy Henderson, Jack Jeans (Craigentinny)	Maryhill	
1991	K Logan, G Scott, E Logan, Raymond Logan (Kirkliston)	Rock	
1992	J. Scott, Haw, Lightfoot, Quigley (Wellington Park)	Gala Waverley	
1993	Willie Wells, Stuart Wilson, Graham Lyall, Norrie Amos (Hawick)	Currie	
1994	Will Caine, Graeme Falconer, G Young, Geordie Speirs (Drongan Miner's Welfare)	Spittal	
1995	James Rippey, Robert Menzies, David McLennan, Allan Mackillop (Bogleha')	Dreghorn	
1996	B Mason, D Breen, T Crone, J Peasie (B.P Grangemouth)	Longside	
1997	Mark Baillie, Stan Baillie, Kenny Cairney, Alan Cairney (Stranraer West End BC)	Larbert	
1998	Ian Laverie, Donald Fisher, Alan McHardie, Alan Hainey (Glenluce)	Newton Park	
1999	D. Clarke, B. Nicholson, S. Robertson, J. Young (Blantyre)	Culter	
2000	D Lawrie, D Drysdale, G Taylor, W Arnott (Bathgate)	Stewarton	
2001	Garry McNab, Andy Burt, Graeme Dodds, Angus Blair (Haddington)	Dalzell	
2002	Scott Davies, Bert Barnstaple, Iain Coats, Stuart Simpson (Dalzell)	Orbiston	
2003	Graeme Bremner, Kevin Beaton, David Beaton, Willie Beaton (Aberchirder)	Parkside	
2004	Paul Lyon, Rab Smith, James Brander, Zander Mair (Macduff)	Chryston	
2005	Willie Wyles, Bruce McCall, Mark Stenhouse, Colin Falconer (Methil)	Wellmeadow	
2006	Maurice Brown, Darren Smith, Scott Pirie, Scott Murray (Montrose)	Prestwick	
2007	Chris McCafferty, Andy Grant, Stuart Forrest, Robert Grant (Overtown & Waterloo)	Thornhill	
2008	Joda Reid, Alex McIlravey, Rodger Lynn, Ian Brown (Gourock Park)	Haddington	
2009	Murray Thomson, Brian Jolly, Stewart Anderson, James Gribben Jr. (Glaisnock Valley)	Blackhill	
2010	Gordon Pretice, Derek Campbell. Mark McGowan, Ian Campbell (Houldsworth)	Rock	
2011	Graham Pringle, Craig Aitken, Richard Tough, James Hogg (Carrick Knowe)	Stranraer West End	
2012	S. Guthrie, T. Bohan, S. Gemmell, G. Johnstone (Auchinleck)	Bogleha'	
2013	Shaun Kelly, John McGilvray, Brian McAlees, Mark McLees (Wellington Park)	Adrian	
2014	Steven Scott, Marco Pellegrini, Stephen Lowrie Sr., Marcus McGowan (Pollokshaws)	Bonnyrigg	
2015	Alistair McCallum, Scott Brown, Darren O'Rourke, David Crawford (West Kilbride)	Troon Portland	
2016	Archie Pollock, Ian Robertson, David Robertson, Alistair Robertson (Milngavie)	Eddlewood	
2017	James Boyce, Graham Gunion, Calum Williamson & Martin Williamson (Irvine Park)	Huntly	
2018	Graham Pringle, John Priestley, Stephen Pringle, James Hogg (Carrick Knowe)	Marchmount	
2019	Kevin Hunter, Danny Gormley Jr., Andy Jeffrey, Andy Caldwell (Craigentinny)	Glencarse	
2020 & 2021 cancelled due to COVID-19 pandemic
2022	Josh Spalding, Lewis Betts, Daniel Gormley, Andrew Caldwell (Craigentinny)	Inverkeithing	
2023	Shaun Wilson, Robbie Wilson, Blair Fleming, Christopher Stein (Windygates Durievale)	Quarter	
2024	John Stevenson, Kevin McDougall, Colin Bonner, Ronnie Duncan (Bonnyrigg)	Hyndland	
2025	John Reid Jnr, Robbie Cuthill, Stewart Mcalees, John Fleming Jnr (Port Glasgow)	Quarter	

=== Women's events ===
==== Singles ====
Year	Champion	Ref
1936	Mrs Paton (Wallace and Weir)	
1937	Mrs Kent (Clarkston)	
1938	Mrs H. Murphy (Blackhall)	
1939	Mrs A. Reid (Foxley)	
1940–1945 not held due to World War II
1946	Mrs G. McMurtie (Hawkhill)	
1947	T. McGill (Mauchline)	
1948	W. Copeland (Linthouse)	
1949	C. Westwood (Netherton)	
1950	J. Barr (Overtown & Waterloo)	
1951	H. McGeachan (Halfway & District)	
1952	W. Miller (Ayr)	
1953	T. McGill (Mauchline)	
1954	G. Cameron (Maitiand)	
1955	H. McGeachan (Cambuslang)	
1956	N. Carmichael (Springburn)	
1957	E. Allardice (Daimuir)	
1958	Elizabeth Skeldon (Port William)	
1959	J. Leck (Glasgow Transport)	
1960	M. Chambers (Drumoyne)	
1961	J. Allardice (Callendar M.W.)	
1962	N. Young (Inverkeithing)	
1963	A. Knowles (Kilbarchan)	
1964	K. Baguley (Westermains)	
1965	Mrs Rodgers (Valleyfield)	
1966	J. Hendry (Hamilton Caledonian)	
1967	J. Sharpe (Wardie)	
1968	D. Sinclair (Mosspark)	
1969	R. Bell (Westerton)	
1970	N. Carroll (Newport on Tay)	
1971	Jean Frame (Newmains)	
1972	Betty Todd (Riddrie)	
1973	E. Clark (Croftfoot)	
1974	Betty Ireland (Dalbettie)	
1975	S. Valentine (Lugar)	
1976	Eva Neil (Kirkinill)	
1977	E. Clark (Croftfoot)	
1978	Cissie McParland (Whitiburn)	
1979	Nancy Hyslop (Kingarth)	
1980	Marion Carroll (Irvine Park)	
1981	Jessie Lawson (Ardeer)	
1982	Helen Wright (Cumbernauld)	
1983	Margaret Smith (Belvidere)	
1984	Jean Barnes (Templeton)	
1985	Christine McLean (Cardonald)	
1986	Janice Maxwell (Castle Douglas)	
1987	Annette Evans (Willow Bank)	
1988	Joyce Lindores (Ettrick Forest)	
1989	Liz Wren (Bonnybridge)	
1990	Margaret Ritchie (Wishaw South)	
1991	Sarah Gourlay (Annbank)	
1992	Barbara Green (Port Gordon)	
1993	Joyce Cormack (Seafield, Aberdeen)	
1994	Betty Smith (L.W.M. Galston)	
1995	Sarah Gourlay (Annbank)	
1996	Nan Mulholland (Glengarnock)	
1997	Joyce Lindores (Ettrick Forest)	
1998	Sandra Steven (Uphall Station)	
1999	Margaret Letham (Burnbank Hamilton)	
2000	Eileen Fraser (Balgownie)	
2001	Joyce Miller (Greenfaulds)	
2002	Jean Reid (Waterloo)	
2003	Karen Dawson (Denny)	
2004	Celia Smith (Buckhaven)	
2005	Annemarie Fletcher (Paisley Victoria)	
2006	Kathy Houston (Caledonian)	
2007	Lorraine Malloy (Spring Grove)	
2008	Marie Todd (Newton St Boswells)	
2009	Lorraine Malloy (Spring Grove)	
2010	Caroline Brown (Bellshill & Mossend)	
2011	Yvonne Veitch (East Lothian Co-op)	
2012	Lorna Smith (Linlithgow)	
2013	Lorna Smith (Linlithgow)	
2014	Lorna Smith (Linlithgow)	
2015	Eileen McEwan (Lanark Thistle)	
2016	Donna Fleming (Busby)	
2017	Dee Hoggan (Tranent)	
2018	Laura Welsh (Baillieston)	
2019	Margaret Letham (Burnbank Hamilton)	
2020 & 2021 cancelled due to COVID-19 pandemic
2022	Natalie McWilliams (Crookston)	
2023	Emma Mitchell (Gilmerton)	
2024	Jaclyn Neil (Arthurlie)	
2025	Emma Macleod (Dumbarton)	

==== Most singles titles ====
Name	Titles	Year
Lorna Smith	3	2012, 2013 2014

==== Pairs ====
Year	Champion	Ref
1936	Blackhall	
1937	Shettleston	
1938	Radnor Park	
1939	Hyndland	
1940–1945 not held due to World War II
1946	Fauldhouse	
1947	Hawkhill	
1948	Halfway & District	
1949	Bonnyrigg	
1950	Hawkhill	
1951	Shawlands, Newbattle	
1952	Richardson & Hayes (Lockerbie)	
1953	Ardrossan	
1954	St. Clair	
1955	Milngavie	
1956	Bonnyrigg	
1957	Chryston & District	
1958	Dudley	
1959	Crosshill	
1960	Hillington Estate	
1961	Kelvindale	
1962	Carnoustie	
1963	Fauldhouse	
1964	Rankin Park	
1965	Crosshill	
1966	Mrs Innes & Mrs Summers (Blantyre)	
1967	Mrs Dow & Mrs Denovan (Alloa East End)	
1968	Sarah Gourlay & Mrs Leslie (Annbank)	
1969	Mrs Brown & Mrs McLeod (Queen's Park)	
1970	Mrs Smith & Mrs Wilson (Whitehouse & Grange)	
1971	Mrs I McCulloch & Mrs M Kennedy (Drongan)	
1972	Mrs Woods & Mrs McSorland (Lugar Works)	
1973	Mrs Young & Mrs Chalmers (St. Vincent)	
1974	Mrs M Frame & Mrs A Rice (Marchmount)	
1975	Mrs Clark & Mrs Russell (Bonnybridge)	
1976	Mrs Wilson & Mrs Williamson (Thornhill)	
1977	Mrs Cooper Mrs Allison - Craigentinny	
1978	Mrs McGregor & Mrs McDonald (Mount Vernon)	
1979	Mrs Matthews & Mrs Reid (Ayr)	
1980	Margaret McMillan & Catherine Picken (Giffnock)	
1981	I. Johnston & M. Archibald (Eddlewood)	
1982	Margaret Gray & Annie Knowles (Kirbarchan)	
1983	May Carson & Sarah Morrison (Newbattle)	
1984	Margaret Scott & Ann Leslie (Annbank)	
1985	Janette Thomson & Rena Price (Overtown & Waterloo)	
1986	Ann McPhie & Isobel McPhie (Orbiston)	
1987	L. McDermid & A. MacDonald (Thurso)	
1988	M. Munro & D. Stevely (Mount Vernon)	
1989	Mrs Corkindale & Mrs Chisholm (Planefield)	
1990	Joan Gordon & Helen Cullen (Milngavie)	
1991	W McCrae & V Nairn (Stewarton)	
1992	Ann Bettley & Jean Blades (Airdrie Central)	
1993	Karen D'Agrosa & Joyce Lindores (Ettrick Forest)	
1994	M. Crossley & J. Robertson (Townholm)	
1995	Val Bryce & Dot Barr (Ayr Forehill)	
1996	Ann Clark & Margaret Russell (Livingston Letham)	
1997	Alison Parke & June Struthers (Zetland)	
1998	Julie Forrest & Joyce Dickey (Hawick)	
1999	M. Leishman & Vikki Leishman (Carron and Carronshore)	
2000	Sarah Gourlay & M. Shimmons (Annbank)	
2001	J. Sinclair & M. MacLeod (Invergordon)	
2002	H. Stevenson & T. Matthews (Rutherglen)	
2003	Val Bryce & Dot Barr (Ayr Forehill)	
2004	J. Sinclair & M. MacLeod (Invergordon)	
2005	H. Stevenson & T. Mathews (Rutherglen)	
2006	Sandra Steven & Kirsteen McLelland (Uphall Station)	
2007	Delia Flannigan & Angela Uttley (Blackburn, West Lothian)	
2008	Sandra Steven & Kirsteen McLelland (Uphall Station)	
2009	Leanne Baillie & Lauren Baillie (Cockenzie & Port Seton)	
2010	Sandra Willox & Ann Leiper (Longside)	
2011	Leanne Baillie & Lauren Baillie (Cockenzie & Port Seton)	
2012	Leanne Baillie & Lauren Baillie (Cockenzie & Port Seton)	
2013	Leanne Baillie & Lauren Baillie (Cockenzie & Port Seton)	
2014	Sandra Steven & Kirsteen McLelland (Uphall Station)	
2015	Irene Smith & Marie Milne (Burrelton)	
2016	Sandra Steven & Kirsteen McLelland (Uphall Station)	
2017	Sandra Steven & Kirsteen McLelland (Uphall Station)	
2018	Delia Flannigan & Angela Uttley (Glenmavis) (Cockenzie & Port Seton)	
2019	Hannah Smith & Claire Johnston (Auchinleck)	
2020 & 2021 cancelled due to COVID-19 pandemic
2022	Jean Fisher & Lauren Forgie (Bridge of Allan)	
2023	Susan Allan & Alison Ross (Bainfield)	
2024	Morag Weir & Lynn McLachlan (Dalserf)	
2025	Lyn Houston & Rebecca Houston (Prestwick)	

==== Triples ====
Year	Champion	Ref
1981	N. Cross, J. Duncan, May Bryson (Dalserf)	
1982	Mrs. Alder, Mrs. Speirs, Mrs. Hughes (Riverside, Stirling)	
1983	Ray Quale, Mary Anderson, Isa Hay (Orbiston)	
1984	Phylis Galloway, Marion Graham, Morag Brockett (Bishopbriggs)	
1985	E. McGarvie, A. Graham, Frances Whyte (Priorscroft)	
1986	Mary Kirk, Jean Grant, Grace Freeland (Overtown & Waterloo)	
1987	H. Weather, N. Flett, K. Harrold (Fochabers)	
1988	Helen Bell, Helen Mathieson, Madge Brown (Strichen)	
1989	M. Holland, A. Weir, B. Lessels (Cambuslang)	
1990	May McAvoy, Isobel Pratt, Helen Wylie (Lochwinnoch)	
1991	D. King, M. Steele, A. Burns (Dalry)	
1992	Joan Kyle, Marjory Frost, Irene Bennett (Wilton)	
1993	Helen Bell, Helen Mathieson, Madge Brown (Strichen)	
1994	Jean Armstrong, Grace Scott, Margaret Shearer (Carnwarth)	
1995	Jean Thomson, Mary Wright, Jean Nairn (Dunblane)	
1996	Betty Hadden, Jean Millar, Margaret MacRae (Dalkeith)	
1997	Irene Wilson, Margaret Stavert, Julie Forrest (Hawick)	
1998	Margaret Reid, Margaret Wilson, Kath Stevenson (Stranraer)	
1999	J. Law, D. Nelson, N. Peacock (Bridge of Earn)	
2000	M. Strickland, M. Dougan, J. Ballentine (Currie)	
2001	A. Neilson, M. Balloch, P. Johnston (Zetland)	
2002	M. Bell, L. Harvey, A. Robertson (Kinghorn)	
2003	E. Ferguson, S. Coleman, J. Broadhurst (M'head & Birkhill)	
2004	J. Struthers, M. Balloch, P. Johnston (Zetland)	
2005	L. Allison, N. McKay, V. Sneddon (Denny)	
2006	R. Cochrane, M. Campbell, I. Milne (Strathaven)	
2007	L. Cooper, J. Moonie, S. Sinclair (Burnbank Hamilton)	
2008	B. McKenna, J. Forbes, M. Davidson (Inverness)	
2009	June Wylie, Sheila Hanlon, Peggy Thomson (Castle Kennedy)	
2010	Jennifer Yule, Isabel Gilchrist, Rosemary Speirs (J. G. Fleming)	
2011	Jean Thomson, Jessie Bell, Sadie Spalding (Watson Memorial)	
2012	E. Cooke, Marie Graham, Mary Galbraith (Riccarton)	
2013	June Austin, Evelyn Oliver, Anne Motroni (Dumfries)	
2014	Liz Stewart, Elspeth Brett, Meggie Macdonald (Ardross Alness)	
2015	Esther Beattie, Charlotte Somerville, Mary McKay (Cowdenbeath)	
2016	Morag Jones, June McLaughlin, Helen Nairn (Muirhead & Birkhill)	
2017	Maralyn Murton, Maureen Hyslop, Elizabeth Reid (Ayr Craigie)	
2018	Lynn Stein, Julie Sword, Donna Comrie (Leven)	
2019	Alison Plenderleith, Esther Laidlaw, Elizabeth Halliday (Dalkeith)	
2020 & 2021 cancelled due to COVID-19 pandemic
2022	Chloe Thomson, Tracey Breslin, Nicole McKean (Tanfield)	
2023	Gal Notman, Emma Kennedy, Susan Morrison (Stonehouse)	
2024	Kara Lees, Sophie McGrouther, Lynn Lees (Townhill)	
2025	Laura Mccrorie, Kim Hoggan, Emma Blyth (Tranent)	

==== Fours ====
Year	Champion	Ref
1936	Bearsdon	
1937	Moffat	
1938	Kirkhill	
1939	Linthouse	
1940–1945 not held due to World War II
1946	Clydebank	
1947	Cambuslang	
1948	Blackhhill	
1949	Irvine Winton	
1950	Hamilton Caledonian	
1951	Busby	
1952	Chalmers, Brown, Mclelland Macallan (Milngavie)	
1953	Bridge of Allan	
1954	Auchengeich	
1955	Halfway & District	
1956	Caldercraig	
1957	Tollcross	
1958	Ardrossan	
1960	Killermont	
1961	Watterfield	
1962	West Kilbride	
1963	Ayr	
1964	Woodend	
1965	Bishopbriggs	
1966	Ms Anderson, Goldie, Barbour, Clements (Troon)	
1967	Ms Watson, Liddle, Manzie, Bain (Carrick Knowe)	
1968	Ms Fairweather, Liddle, Watson, Manzie (Carrick Knowe)	
1969	Ms McClellan, Spiers, McFarlane, White (Inkerman)	
1970	Ms Cooper, Good, Tinning, Stewart (Maxwelltown)	
1971	Ms Logan, Smith, Barbour, Bunten (Mauchline)	
1972	Ms Barclay, Nicoll, Thompson, Walker (Crossgates)	
1973	Ms Quigley, Couper, Cleland, Parker (Darvel)	
1974	Ms Simpson, Ross, Aitkin, McFarlane (Kelvindale)	
1975	Ms Brown, Douglas, Benet, Stewart (Rutherglen)	
1976	Ms Jackson, Dunlop, Waterson, Jackson (Coatbrdige)	
1977	Ms Young, Lovell. Rennison, Halliday (Fairfield)	
1978	M Thomson, J McKenzie, J Stark, M Halliday (Whitburn)	
1979	Jess Williams, Margaret Wilson, Margaret Cameron, Isobel Black (Kingston BC, Glasgow)	
1980	M Cummings, Mrs Jackson, Wilson, M Anderson (Castlehill)	
1981	M. Bain, M. Gardiner, N. Hamilton, Janet Menzies (Douglas Victoria)	
1982	Betty Pettigrew, Sadie Young, Tirza Powell, Margaret Logan (Mauchline)	
1983	Jean Wilson, Jane Coulston, Heather Hamilton, Susan Kelly (Stranraer)	
1984	Ms Auld, Kelly, Temple, Greta Crawford (Drumoyne)	
1985	H Boyd, J Auld, A Mitchell, N Graham (Tarbolton)	
1986	N Stevenson, M Thomson, A Watson, Jean McLean (Crookston)	
1987	Jean Armstrong, Margaret Gray, Grace Scott, Margaret Shearer (Carmwath)	
1988	M Scot, E Weir, N McNeil, A Thomson (Denny)	
1989	Ms Stevenson, Gallacher, Watson, Ward (Crookston)	
1990	Bertha Baker, Margaret Taylor, Sarah McKechnie, Dorothy Barr (Ayr Forehill)	
1991	Mrs Hamilton, Robertson, Peters, Bryson (Dalserf)	
1992	J. Gillies, N. Cramb, I. Drockell, A. Blackmore (Ardrossan)	
1993	Peggy Hunter, Frances Allan, Mary Strachan, Nan Hunter (Kirn & Hunter's Quay)	
1994	I. Frew, S. Wallace, M. Nelson, J. Sherlock (Glengowan)	
1995	Ms Gordon, McLelland, Ferguson, Brown (Dumfries)	
1996	M. MacEwen, M Wright M. Stratton, Betty Donaghy (Radnor Park)	
1997	M. Higgins, S. Lee, M. Burrel, I. Renton (Spittal)	
1998	E. Douglas, M. MabonM. Gardiner, M. Milne (Selkirk)	
1999	I. Wright, S. Mitchell, Margaret Russell, Ann Clark (Livingston Letham)	
2000	B. Kennedy, M. Calder, M. Jeffrey, B. Hubbard (Armadale)	
2001	F. Smith, P. Stewart, E. Morran M. Dunning (Muirhead & Birkhill)	
2002	C. Boswell, A. Matthew, S. Slater, J. MacDonald (Colinton)	
2003	E. Goodwin, H. Walker, I. Riddick, J. Marshall (Marchmount)	
2004	M. McCormack, J. Steed, L Fleming, B Anderson (Ardeer Rec)	
2005	K. Moffat, Anne Motroni, J. Oliver, M. Ferguson (Dumfries)	
2006	Louise Hutchison, Barbara Forsyth, Kay Purvis, Sheila Douglas (Chirnside)	
2007	Louise Hutchison, Barbara Forsyth, Kay Purvis, Sheila Douglas (Chirnside)	
2008	H.Sinclair, S.MacKinnon, E. Reid. M. Davie (Strathmiglo)	
2009	I. McDougall, A. Drummond, M. Neilson, M. Lyall (Kilmarnock Portland)	
2010	Vivien Taylor, Moira Cronie, Kath Stevenson, Trish Henderson (Castle Kennedy)	
2011	Margaret Reid, Jean Sutton, Kay McHaffie, Susan Kelly (Stranraer)	
2012	Judy Mowat, Elizabeth Macdonald, Jean Elder, Liz Rhodes (Thurso)	
2013	Molly Morton, Marie Johnston, Liz O'Neil, Ann Gilmour (Townholm)	
2014	Jane Spence, Liz Nelson, Elizabeth Campbell, Anne Brown (Newton Park)	
2015	Pam McGrory, Alison Bradfore, Val Stewart, June Struthers (Zetland)	
2016	Susan Kelly, Kay McHaffie, Doreen Hillen, Margaret Reid (Stranraer)	
2017	Louise Noon, Elizabeth Campbell, Jane Spence, Anne Brown (Newton Park)	
2018	Louise Noon, Jan Docherty, Liz Nelson, Anne Brown (Newton Park)	
2019	Aimmee Thomson, Gillian Kirk, Rebekah Weir, Eilidh Weir (Alloa East End)	
2020 & 2021 cancelled due to COVID-19 pandemic
2022	Alison Brown, Doreen Reeder, Margaret Kain, Vikki Turner (Buchan Park)	
2023	Jane Anderson, Anne Bone, Julie Sword, Lynn Stein (Wingygates Durievale)	
2024	Jane Anderson, Anne Bone, Julie Sword, Lynn Stein (Windygates Durievale)	
2025	Carly Brown, Christine McCrimmond, Ina Todd, Pam Murchie (West Kilbride)	
