= Alex Niven (bowls) =

Scottish lawn bowler

Personal information
- Nationality: British (Scottish)
- Born: 1877 Galashiels, Scotland
- Died: unknown

Sport
- Sport: Lawn bowls
- Club: Abbotsford BC, Galashiels
Medal record
Representing Scotland
National Championships
Gold medal – first place	1933	pairs

Alexander Niven (1877 – date of death unknown) was a Scottish Lawn bowls international who competed in the 1934 British Empire Games.

== Bowls career ==
Niven was a member of Abbotsford Bowling Club of Galashiels and was a Yarn Merchants Clerk, living at 46 Douglas Place in Galashiels. In 1933, partnering his younger brother George Niven, they won the inaugural Scottish National Bowls Championships pairs title.

He represented the Scottish team at the 1934 British Empire Games in London, England. He competed in the pairs event with George Niven, where they finished in fifth place.

In 1939 he was the honorary treasurer of the Border Bowling Association.
