= Kenneth Coulson =

British lawn bowler

Personal information
- Nationality: British (English)
- Born: 3 July 1910 Croydon, Surrey
- Died: December 1987 (aged 77) Worthing

Sport
- Sport: Lawn bowls
- Club: Croydon BC
Medal record
Representing England
British Isles Championships
Gold medal – first place	1960	singles

Kenneth Walter Oxenford Coulson (1910–1987) was an English international lawn bowler.

== Bowls career ==
Coulson became the first British singles champion after winning the British Isles Bowls Championships in 1959, when bowling for England and the Croydon Bowls Club. He qualified for the event by virtue of winning the English singles crown the previous year. He was a motor car salesman by trade and was first capped by England in 1955.
