= Billy Mellors =

Scottish international indoor and lawn bowler

Personal information
- Nationality: Scottish
- Born: 1975 (age 50–51)

Sport
- Club: East Lothian IBC and Haddington
Medal record
Representing Scotland
World Outdoor Championships
Silver medal – second place	2008 Christchurch	pairs
British Isles Championships
Gold medal – first place	2014	pairs

Billy Mellors (born 1975) is a Scottish international indoor and lawn bowler.

== Bowls career ==
His finest moment came when he won the silver medal in the pairs with Darren Burnett at the 2008 World Outdoor Bowls Championship in Christchurch.

He won the Scottish National Bowls Championships in 2006 and also won the 2015 Scottish indoor bowls title
