= Thomas Smetherham =

Scottish lawn bowler

Personal information
- Nationality: British (Scottish)
- Born: Scotland

Sport
- Sport: Lawn bowls
- Club: Cumnock Bowling Club
Medal record
Representing Scotland
National Championships
Gold medal – first place	1955	fours/rinks

Thomas Smetherham also spelt Smetherhem was a Scottish international lawn bowler who competed at the British Empire and Commonwealth Games (now Commonwealth Games).

== Biography ==
Smetherham was a member of the Cumnock Bowling Club and was part of the Cumnock four of John Hampson, George Ferguson and Alexander Hodge, that won the 1955 McEwan Trophy (the Scottish National Bowls Championships).

He represented the 1958 Scottish team at the 1958 British Empire and Commonwealth Games in Cardiff, Wales, where he participated in the fours/rinks event, with John Hampson, George Ferguson and Alexander Hodge, finishing in sixth place.
