= Laura Welsh (bowls) =

Scottish bowls player

Personal information
- Nationality: British (Scottish)
- Born: 20/11/1989

Sport
- Sport: Lawn bowls
- Club: Baillieston BC
Medal record
Representing Scotland
British Isles Championships
Gold medal – first place	2019	singles

Laura Welsh is a Scottish lawn bowler.

== Bowls career ==
In 2018 she won the Scottish National Bowls Championships singles title . After winning the 2018 Scottish National singles title she subsequently won the singles at the British Isles Bowls Championships in 2019.
