= William Downes Jones =

Scottish lawn bowler

Personal information
- Nationality: British (Scottish)
- Born: Scotland

Sport
- Sport: Lawn bowls
- Club: Ardrossan BC
Medal record
Representing Scotland
National Championships
Gold medal – first place	1957	singles

William Downes Jones also known as Willie Jones, was a Scottish international lawn bowler who competed at the British Empire and Commonwealth Games (now Commonwealth Games).

== Biography ==
Jones was a member of the Ardrossan Bowling Club and first represented Scotland at international level in 1950. Living at Barrie Terrace in Ardrossan, he was a shoemaker by trade and represented Ayrshire at county level, winning singles championship in 1947 and 1950.

He won the 1957 Roseberry Trophy (the Scottish National Bowls Championships in singles).

He represented the 1958 Scottish team at the 1958 British Empire and Commonwealth Games in Cardiff, Wales, where he participated in the singles event, just missing out on a medal after finishing fourth.

Jones was part of a bowling family, his brother R. Jones played bowls at district level and his father Dick Jones was still playing bowls at 78 years of age.
