= Suzie Dingle =

Bowler

Personal information
- Nationality: Jersey
- Born: 1 April 1958 (age 68)
Medal record
Representing Jersey
World Outdoor Championships
Silver medal – second place	2004 Leamington Spa	fours

Suzanne Jayne Dingle (born 1958) is an international lawn and indoor bowler representing Jersey.

Suzie was part of the fours team with Christine Grimes, Gean O'Neil and Karina Bisson that won the silver medal at the 2004 World Outdoor Bowls Championship in Leamington Spa.
