= Steve Hill (bowls) =

Welsh international lawn bowler and former British champion

Personal information
- Nationality: British (Welsh)
- Born: 1957 Wales

Sport
- Sport: lawn bowls
- Club: Porthcawl BC
Medal record
Representing Wales
British Isles Championships
Gold medal – first place	2002	singles

Steve Hill (born 1957) is a Welsh international lawn bowler and former British champion.

== Bowls career ==
Hill won the Welsh National Bowls Championships singles in 2001 and subsequently won the singles at the British Isles Bowls Championships in 2002.

Hill bowls for Porthcawl BC.
