= Bowls Scotland =

Scottish governing body for sport of bowls

- Sport: Bowls
- Jurisdiction: Scotland
- Membership: 816 clubs
- Founded: 2011
- Affiliation: World Bowls
- Headquarters: Ayr
- President: Ron McArthur and Marella O'Neill
- (founded): 1892

Official website
- www.bowlsscotland.com
- (Scotland)

Bowls Scotland is the governing body for the sport of bowls in Scotland. A subsidiary of World Bowls, it is responsible for the leadership, development and management of lawn bowls in Scotland. It is headquartered in Ayr.

The organisation's presidents are Ron McArthur (of Zetland Bowling Club), for the men's, and Marella O'Neill (of Dalry Bowling Club), for the women's.

== History ==
In 1848, 200 Scottish clubs came together at Glasgow's Town Hall in a failed attempt to form the world's first national bowls body. However, in 1892, James Brown of Sanquhar Bowling Club and Dr Clark of the Partick Bowling Club formed the Scottish Bowls Association, which began with 173 affiliated clubs. The Scottish Association's rules was later adopted by Australia.

The first championship event (rink/fours) was held the following year in 1893, at the Queen's Park Bowling Club, Glasgow (it was the first national championships and was known as the McEwan Cup). The first singles (originally called the Roseberry Trophy) was held in 1894 and the first women's event, the singles was held in 1936.

The Scottish Bowls Association and Scottish Women's Bowling Association unified in 2011 and underwent rebranding to become Bowls Scotland.

The Bowls Scotland National Championships, held at National Centre for Bowling in Northfield, Ayr, is one of the largest week-long bowls competition in the world. It sees over one thousand players competing for 24 national championships across the men's, women's, youth and para sections.

== Structure ==
As of August 2024, Scotland's 816 bowling clubs are grouped into 32 districts:

- Aberdeen
- Angus
- Ayrshire Mid
- Ayrshire North
- Ayrshire South
- Borders
- Clackmannan & Kinross
- Dumfriesshire & Stewartry
- Dunbartonshire & Argyllshire
- Dunbartonshire East
- East Lothian
- Edinburgh N. E. & Leith
- Edinburgh South West
- Fife North East
- Fife South West
- Glasgow North East
- Glasgow North West
- Glasgow South East
- Glasgow South West
- Kincardine
- Lanarkshire North 1
- Lanarkshire North 2
- Lanarkshire South
- Midlothian
- Moray, Banff & Buchan
- Northern
- Perthshire
- Renfrewshire East
- Renfrewshire West, Bute & Cowal
- Stirlingshire
- West Lothian
- Wigtownshire
