= British Isles Bowls Championships =

Tournament information
- Sport: Lawn bowls
- Established: men (1960) women (1972)
- Website: British Isles Bowls Council

The British Isles Bowls Championships is a tournament held between the champions of their respective nations, from England, Scotland, Wales, a combined Ireland, and more recently Guernsey and Jersey. It was first held in 1960 although the triples event did not start until 1977.

The women's events started in June 1972, with the triples starting in 1982. The first women's singles winner was Lilian Nicholas of Wales. The first men's singles winner was Kenneth Coulson of England and the legendary David Bryant MBE holds the record for the most singles titles with four.

The tournament is held the year after each of the National champions have been crowned. The 2020 edition was initially cancelled due to the COVID-19 pandemic but because there were no National Championships held during 2020 (also due to the pandemic) the 2020 edition was rescheduled for 2021.

== Men's singles ==
| Year | Champion | Nation | Venue | Ref |
|---|---|---|---|---|
| 1959/60 | Kenneth Coulson | England | Paisley Park, Belfast | |
| 1960/61 | David Bryant MBE | England | Eastbourne | |
| 1961/62 | Ernest M. Johnson | Scotland | Glasgow | |
| 1962/63 | Charles Mercer | England | Cardiff | |
| 1963 | Billy Tate | Ireland | Belfast | |
| 1964 | Billy Gibb | Scotland | York | |
| 1965 | John Hershaw | Scotland | Glasgow | |
| 1966 | Leon Stanfield | Wales | Llanarcy | |
| 1967 | Roy Fulton | Ireland | Belfast | |
| 1968 | John Lamont | Scotland | London | |
| 1969 | Bob Motroni | Scotland | Glasgow | |
| 1970 | Paul Wright | Wales | Aberdare | |
| 1971/72 | David Bryant MBE | England | Bristol | |
| 1973 | David Bryant MBE | England | Bournemouth | |
| 1974 | David Bryant MBE | England | Edinburgh | |
| 1975 | Bill Irish | England | Llanelli | |
| 1976 | Jim McLagan | Scotland | Larne | |
| 1977 | David McGill Jr. | Scotland | Worthing | |
| 1978 | John Russell Evans | Wales | Uddington | |
| 1979 | Charlie Burch | England | Pontypool | |
| 1980 | Sammy Allen | Ireland | Nottingham | |
| 1981 | David Corkill | Ireland | Worthing | |
| 1982 | Fraser Muirhead | Scotland | Ayr | |
| 1983 | Chris Ward | England | Cardiff | |
| 1984 | John Bell | England | Larne | |
| 1985 | Wynne Richards | England | Worthing | |
| 1986 | Willie McLaughlin | Scotland | Paisley | |
| 1987 | Angus Blair | Scotland | Llanelli | |
| 1988 | Graham Robertson | Scotland | Larne | |
| 1989 | Richard Bray | England | Worthing | |
| 1990 | John Ottaway | England | Methil | |
| 1991 | Will Thomas | Wales | Ebbw Vale | |
| 1992 | Tony Allcock MBE | England | Larne | |
| 1993 | Alex Lightbody | Ireland | Worthing | |
| 1994 | Colin Best | Ireland | Ayr | |
| 1995 | Brett Morley | England | Llanelli | |
| 1996 | Noel Graham | Ireland | Larne | |
| 1997 | Jeremy Henry | Ireland | Worthing | |
| 1998 | Richard Brittan | England | Ayr | |
| 1999 | Clifford Craig | Ireland | St Brelade, Jersey | |
| 2000 | Nick Brett | England | Llandrindod Wells | |
| 2001 | Robert Weale | Wales | Belfast | |
| 2002 | Steve Hill | Wales | Worthing | |
| 2003 | Darren Burnett | Scotland | Ayr | |
| 2004 | Oliver Morris | Wales | Vale of Glamorgan | |
| 2005 | Martin McHugh | Ireland | Belfast | |
| 2006 | Darren Burnett | Scotland | Clevedon | |
| 2007 | Kevin James | Wales | Sighthill | |
| 2008 | Sandy Wotherspoon | Scotland | Llandrindod Wells | |
| 2009 | Roger Jones | Wales | Belmont | |
| 2010 | Alister Reid | Scotland | Worthing | |
| 2011 | Richard Leonard | Ireland | Sighthill | |
| 2012 | Paul Daly | Ireland | Llandrindod Wells | |
| 2013 | Ian McClure | Ireland | Dublin | |
| 2014 | David Kingdon | Wales | Leamington Spa | |
| 2015 | Jason Greenslade | Wales | Eddlewood | |
| 2016 | Martin McHugh | Ireland | Llandrindod Wells | |
| 2017 | Thomas Greechan | Jersey | Belmont | |
| 2018 | Ross Davis | Jersey | Leamington Spa | |
| 2019 | Louis Ridout | England | Ayr Northfield | |
| 2020 & 2021 cancelled due to COVID-19 pandemic | | | | |
| 2022 | Ed Morris | England | Llandrindod Wells | |
| 2023 | Ed Morris | England | Ayr | |
| 2024 | Ross Owen | Wales | Victoria Park, Leamington Spa | |
| 2025 | Jamie Walker | England | Llandrindod Wells | |
| 2026 | Iain McLean | Scotland | Ayr | |

== Men's pairs ==
| Year | Lead | Skip | Nation | Venue | Ref |
|---|---|---|---|---|---|
| 1960 | Fred Harris | Jim Brayley | England | Belfast | |
| 1961 | Charlie Plater | Arthur Philbey | England | Eastbourne | |
| 1962 | Alan Whyte | William McGregor | Scotland | Glasgow | |
| 1963 | Harry Shave | Percy Baker | England | Cardiff | |
| 1964 | Don Crichton | William Sommerville | Scotland | Belfast | |
| 1965 | Charlie Taylor | Tom Millar | Ireland | York | |
| 1966 | David Rhys-Jones | David Bryant MBE | England | Glasgow | |
| 1967 | Charlie Taylor | Roy Fulton | Ireland | BP Refineries, Llandarcy | |
| 1968 | Charlie Taylor | Roy Fulton | Ireland | Belfast | |
| 1969 | Alex Henderson | Bill Scott | Scotland | London | |
| 1970 | Jimmy McIntyre | Willie Moore | Scotland | Glasgow | |
| 1971 | Albert Ivett | F. Bishop | Wales | Aberdare | |
| 1972 | Denis Cross | Dave Crocker | England | Bristol | |
| 1973 | Jacky Forrest | Willie Dyet | Scotland | Bournemouth | |
| 1974 | Ronald Milburn | Tommy Armstrong | England | Edinburgh | |
| 1975 | David Rhys-Jones | David Bryant MBE | England | Llanelli | |
| 1976 | Lyn Perkins | Spencer Wilshire | Wales | Larne | |
| 1977 | Norman Harris | Ron Harris | Wales | Worthing | |
| 1978 | Jim Gallagher | Cecil Beck | Ireland | Uddington | |
| 1979 | Lyn Perkins | Spencer Wilshire | Wales | Pontypool | |
| 1980 | Joe Rogan | Micky Murray | Ireland | Nottingham | |
| 1981 | Lyn Perkins | Spencer Wilshire | Wales | Worthing | |
| 1982 | John Price | Harry Price | Wales | Ayr | |
| 1983 | Peter Evans | Jock Thompson | Wales | Cardiff | |
| 1984 | Jeff Wright | Paul Webley | Wales | Larne | |
| 1985 | Hugh Dunlop | Ken Hogg | Ireland | Worthing | |
| 1986 | Roy Pinder + | Frank Maxwell | England | Paisley | |
| 1987 | Jock Brodie | Jackie Greenwood | Scotland | Llanelli | |
| 1988 | David Holt | Thomas Armstrong | England | Larne | |
| 1989 | John White | Angus Blair | Scotland | Worthing | |
| 1990 | John Male | Mark Chard | Wales | Methil | |
| 1991 | Ian Emslie | Alistair Will | Scotland | Ebbw Vale | |
| 1992 | Ronald Gass | John Bell | England | Larne | |
| 1993 | Gary Smith | Andy Thomson | England | Worthing | |
| 1994 | Peter Howells | Gareth Jones | Wales | Ayr | |
| 1995 | Keith Wood | Michael Bennett | England | Llanelli | |
| 1996 | Alec Allan | Ian Robertson | Scotland | Larne | |
| 1997 | Alan Gilmour | Gary Mackie | Scotland | Worthing | |
| 1998 | Peter Le Long | David Le Marquand | Channel Islands | Ayr | |
| 1999 | Tom O'Hara | John Keir | Scotland | St Brelade, Jersey | |
| 2000 | Peter Jenkins | Malcolm Bishop | Wales | Llandrindod Wells | |
| 2001 | Paul Barlow | Stephen Farish | England | Belfast | |
| 2002 | Willie Rankin | Davie Greig | Scotland | Worthing | |
| 2003 | Peter Picknell | Keith Hawes | England | Ayr | |
| 2004 | John Rednall | Clive Webb | England | Llandrindod Wells | |
| 2005 | Daniel De La Mare | Matt Le Ber | Guernsey | Belmont BC, Belfast | |
| 2006 | Glyn Thomas | Robert Horgan | Wales | Clevedon | |
| 2007 | Barry Browne | Martin McHugh | Ireland | Sighthill | |
| 2008 | Colin Goldsmith | Gordon Charlton | England | Llandrindod Wells | |
| 2009 | Ian Henderson | Martin Selway | Wales | Belmont BC, Belfast | |
| 2010 | Brian Hughes | Gary Kelly | Ireland | Worthing | |
| 2011 | David Fisher | Steven Fisher | Scotland | Sighthill | |
| 2012 | Mark McLees | Stephan McLellan | Scotland | Llandrindod Wells | |
| 2013 | Chris Steven | Darren McKenny | Scotland | Dublin | |
| 2014 | Alister Kennedy | Billy Mellors | Scotland | Leamington Spa | |
| 2015 | Craig Carter | Tom Millership | England | Eddlewood | |
| 2016 | Rodney Kane | Barry Kane | Ireland | Llandrindod Wells | |
| 2017 | Louis Ridout | Sam Tolchard | England | Belmont BC, Belfast | |
| 2018 | Aaron Tennant | Gary Kelly | Ireland | Leamington Spa | |
| 2019 | Ross Davis | Malcolm De Sousa | Jersey | Ayr Northfield | |
| 2020 & 2021 cancelled due to COVID-19 pandemic | | | | | |
| 2022 | Steve Jones | Sam Roff | Wales | Llandrindod Wells | |
| 2023 | Ross Davis | Malcolm De Sousa | Jersey | Ayr | |
| 2024 | Nick Wardle | Joe Dawson | England | Victoria Park, Leamington Spa | |
| 2025 | Mike Jackson | John Roberts | Wales | Llandrindod Wells | |
| 2026 | Martin McAleese | Willie McCaw | Ireland | Ayr | |

== Men's triples ==
| Year | Lead | Second | Skip | Country | Venue | Ref |
|---|---|---|---|---|---|---|
| 1972 | Arthur Plested | Ian Harvey | John Lewis | England | Bristol | |
| 1973 | David Cutler | Chris Yelland | Bill Olver | England | Bournemouth | |
| 1974 | Robert Fowlds | Alex Greig | Peter Ball | Scotland | Edinburgh | |
| 1975 | George Adrain | Alec McCartney | Robert Bennie | Scotland | Llanelli | |
| 1976 | Raymond Weir | Ken Hogg | Willie Murray | Ireland | Larne | |
| 1977 | Joe Bain | Jim Halliday | Willie Halliday | Scotland | Worthing | |
| 1978 | John Higgins | David Heatley | Sammy Curry | Ireland | Uddington | |
| 1979 | William Thompson | Dave Thompson | Geoffrey Mee | England | Pontypool | |
| 1980 | Robin Gray | Marcus Craig | Jim Craig | Ireland | Nottingham | |
| 1981 | Charles Pilkington | Tony Horobin | Gordon Niven | England | Worthing | |
| 1982 | Paul Moorehead | Richard Darcy | Paul Smyth | Ireland | Ayr | |
| 1983 | John Price | Harry Price | Ray Hill | Wales | Cardiff | |
| 1984 | John Barrell | Graham Cutts | Roy Cutts | England | Larne | |
| 1985 | Gordon James | Len Branfield | Pip Branfield | England | Worthing | |
| 1986 | Kenneth Frost | David Rhys Jones | David Bryant MBE | England | Paisley | |
| 1987 | Mervyn Jess | David Craig | Charlie Davis | Ireland | Llanelli | |
| 1988 | Dickie McDermott | Joe Williamson | Richard McDermott | Ireland | Larne | |
| 1989 | Davy Carson | Davy Heatley | Davy Johnston | Ireland | Worthing | |
| 1990 | Joe Whyte | Clifford Craig | Ernie Parkinson | Ireland | Methilhill | |
| 1991 | Wyn Matthews | Huw Thomas | Steven Thomas | Wales | Ebbw Vale | |
| 1992 | Paul Barlow | Andrew Baxter | John Bell | England | Larne | |
| 1993 | Eric Sands | Willie Smyth | Jackie Smyth | Ireland | Worthing | |
| 1994 | Barry Moffett | Jeremy Henry | Ian McClure | Ireland | Ayr | |
| 1995 | Colin Dickens | Chris Blake | Robert Wason | Wales | Llanelli | |
| 1996 | Craig Richmond | Jim Fleming | Garry Hood | Scotland | Larne | |
| 1997 | Paul Daly | Brian Daly | Davy Hamilton | Ireland | Worthing | |
| 1998 | Paul Barlow | Andrew Baxter | Stephen Farish | England | Ayr Northfield | |
| 1999 | Cecil Aicken | John McLoughlin | Noel Graham | Ireland | St Brelade, Jersey | |
| 2000 | Nick Davies | Andrew Wason | Mark Letman | Wales | Llandrindod Wells | |
| 2001 | Stephen Birdsey | Paul Ging | Stanley Lant | England | Belfast | |
| 2002 | Nick Cammack | Duncan Robinson | Brett Morley | England | Worthing | |
| 2003 | John Johnson | Derek Logie | Jason Williams | Scotland | Ayr | |
| 2004 | Jim Corrigan | Alan McLean Jr. | Brian Sinclair | Scotland | Llandrindod Wells | |
| 2005 | Stephen Dilks | Christopher Kelly | Mark Walton | England | Belmont | |
| 2006 | Chris Williams | David Gough | Wayne Griffiths | Wales | Clevedon | |
| 2007 | Graham Thomson | John Docherty | Robert Brown | Scotland | Sighthill | |
| 2008 | John Rowcliffe | Alan Shaw | Cyril Renouf | Jersey | Llandrindod Wells | |
| 2009 | Dave Lucas | Len Le Ber | Gary Pitschou | Guernsey | Belmont | |
| 2010 | Neil Taylor | Geoff Simons | Ross Tomlinson | Wales | Worthing | |
| 2011 | David Summers | Chris Price | Mark Thomas | Wales | Sighthill | |
| 2012 | Darren Smith | Gary Nisbet | Andrew Caldwell | Scotland | Llandrindod Wells | |
| 2013 | Gary McCann | Scott McInall | Jim McCann | Scotland | Dublin | |
| 2014 | Tom Pettigrew | Ryan Crawford | Wayne Hogg | Scotland | Leamington Spa | |
| 2015 | Michael Higgins | Tony Bell | Andy Hughes | Ireland | Eddlewood | |
| 2016 | John Keat | Nigel Collins | Matt Le Ber | Guernsey | Llandrindod Wells | |
| 2017 | Chris Ashman | Phil Robbins | Paul Taylor | Wales | Belmont | |
| 2018 | Ean Morton | Mike Robertson | Tristan Morton | England | Leamington Spa | |
| 2019 | Phil Carpenter | Jarrad Breen | Ross Owen | Wales | Ayr Northfield | |
| 2020 & 2021 cancelled due to COVID-19 pandemic | | | | | | |
| 2022 | Christopher Muir | Steve Gunnell | Ed Morris | England | Llandrindod Wells | |
| 2023 | Derek Smith | Gary McCloy | Ian McClure | Ireland | Ayr | |
| 2024 | Derek Hutcheson | Connar Robertson | Dylan Robertson | Scotland | Victoria Park, Leamington Spa | |
| 2025 | Mark Letman | Ross Lewis | Daniel Salmon | Wales | Llandrindod Wells | |
| 2026 | Peter Thomson | Andy Furye | Darren Burnett | Scotland | Ayr | |

== Men's fours ==
| Year | Lead | Second | Third | Skip | Country | Venue | Ref |
|---|---|---|---|---|---|---|---|
| 1960 | Andrew Stewart | James Laing | Dave Kirk | Robert Whitehead | Scotland | Belfast | |
| 1961 | Claude Stephens | Lynn Probert | Tom Griffiths | Albert E. Evans | Wales | Eastbourne | |
| 1962 | Gordon Sparks | Harry Ward | Arthur Knowling Jr. | John Scadgell | England | Glasgow | |
| 1963 | Joe McPartland | Gerry McNeill | Jack Webb | Gerry Crossey | Ireland | Cardiff | |
| 1964 | John Russell Evans | Jim Morgan | Ron Thomas | Gareth Humphreys | Wales | Belfast | |
| 1965 | Tom Russell | Bertie McConnell | Billy Clarke | Joe Carlisle | Ireland | York | |
| 1966 | T. Roberts | W. D. Jones | R.J. Bending | Jock Thompson | Wales | Glasgow | |
| 1967 | A Cruickshanks | J Logan | JR Bradbury | J Adams | Scotland | Llandarcy | |
| 1968 | Cecil Beck | R Mills | Walter Gamble | Jimmy Dennison | Ireland | Belfast | |
| 1969 | Jack Webb | Harry Watterson | Jimmy Donnelly | Gerry Crossey | Ireland | London | |
| 1970 | William Elliott | Reg Bryant | David Rhys-Jones | David Bryant MBE | England | Glasgow | |
| 1971 | Tom O'Neil | Bob McDowell | Phil McAlister | Danny Laverty | Ireland | Aberdare | |
| 1972 | John Knight | William Elliott | David Rhys-Jones | David Bryant MBE | England | Bristol | |
| 1973 | Colin Rees | Edward Oliver | John Thomas | Dai Richards | Wales | Bournemouth | |
| 1974 | Willie Harbinson | Tommy Boyd | Gordon Wylie | John Henry | Ireland | Edinburgh | |
| 1975 | Raymond Weir | R Currie | Ken Hogg | Willie Murray | Ireland | Llanelli | |
| 1976 | Larry McMorran | John Summers | Dave Pearson | Willie Dyet | Scotland | Larne | |
| 1977 | Reginald Cross | Gordon Turner | Norman Kemp | Ernest Baker | England | Worthing | |
| 1978 | David Corkill | Ken Kilpatrick | North McQuay | Willie Watson | Ireland | Uddington | |
| 1979 | Jim Hynd | Willie Hay | Jim Clark | Jim Caldwell | Scotland | Pontypool | |
| 1980 | Ian Butler | John Scott | David Currie | Hepburn Milligan | Scotland | Nottingham | |
| 1981 | Hugh Meddins | G Bishop | AR Dibble | Len Webley | Wales | Worthing | |
| 1982 | Paul Moorehead | Richard Darcy | Brian Carpenter | Paul Smyth | Ireland | Ayr | |
| 1983 | Brian Sloan | Morrow Horner | Ian McKeown | Robin Horner | Ireland | Cardiff | |
| 1984 | Duncan Wilson | Tony Horobin | Alec Atkinson | Gordon Niven | England | Larne | |
| 1985 | Laurie Pull | Peter Pull | Russell Morgan | Chris Paice | England | Worthing | |
| 1986 | David Griggs | David Jarrold | Graham Arnold | Jim Aiton | England | Paisley | |
| 1987 | Ronnie Ramsey | Bob Wood | Andrew Ramsay | Robert Marshall | Scotland | Llanelli | |
| 1988 | Brian Begley | Sean Wragg | Dickie Hughes | Vincent Mullan | Ireland | Larne | |
| 1989 | Steve Beackon | Chris Quainton | Chris Allen | Gary Harrington | England | Worthing | |
| 1990 | John Chandler | Jimmy Cross | Terry Heppell | Martyn Sekjer | England | Methilhill | |
| 1991 | Robert Hastings | Jackie Nelson | Rodney McCutcheon | Gary Scott | Ireland | Ebbw Vale | |
| 1992 | Charlie Folkes | John Power | Howard Green | John Dacey | Wales | Larne | |
| 1993 | Brian Weale | Stuart Weale | David Weale | Robert Weale | Wales | Worthing | |
| 1994 | Willie Wells | Stuart Wilson | Graham Lyall | Norrie Amos | Scotland | Ayr | |
| 1995 | Andrew Wills | Les Gillett | Simon Jones | Tony Allcock MBE | England | Llanelli | |
| 1996 | Ian Stewart | James Caldwell | Dessie Hill | Stephen Moran | Ireland | Larne | |
| 1997 | Brian Weale | Stuart Weale | David Weale | Robert Weale | Wales | Worthing | |
| 1998 | Mark Baillie | Stan Baillie | Kenny Cairney | Alan Cairney | Scotland | Ayr Northfield | |
| 1999 | Billy Chambers | Barry Quinn | Gary Clarke | Mark Shannon | Ireland | St Brelade | |
| 2000 | Peter Day | Paul Diment | Andrew Muskett | Pat Currie | Wales | Llandrindod Wells | |
| 2001 | Mark McPeak | Terry Mulholland | Robin Horner | Chris Mulholland | Ireland | Belfast | |
| 2002 | Michael Nutt | Sammy Hall | James Talbot | Neil Booth | Ireland | Worthing | |
| 2003 | Russell Wall | Brian Rich | David Axon | David Harding | Wales | Ayr | |
| 2004 | Ian Powell | Mike Sturtridge | Ian Ball | Richard Bray | England | Llandrindod Wells | |
| 2005 | Paul Lyon | Rab Smith | James Brander | Zander Mair | Scotland | Belmont | |
| 2006 | Sid Le Maitre | Roy Queripel | Mac Timms | Paul Merrien | Guernsey | Clevedon | |
| 2007 | Charlie Gaye | Dave Perrin | Tim Phillips | Bill Lawer | England | Sighthill | |
| 2008 | Danny May | Ian Airey | Richard Chandler | Stuart Airey | England | Llandrindod Wells | |
| 2009 | David Rowlands | Mark Gaskell | Barry Fleming | Andrew Fleming | Wales | Belmont | |
| 2010 | Murray Thomson | Brian Jolly | Stewart Anderson | James Gribben Jr. | Scotland | Worthing | |
| 2011 | Brian Weale | Stuart Weale | David Weale | Robert Weale | Wales | Sighthill | |
| 2012 | Ian Partridge | Darren Clark | Kevin Le Long | Didier Le Falher | Jersey | Llandrindod Wells | |
| 2013 | Len Le Ber | Garry Collins | Gary Pitschou | Matt Le Ber | Guernsey | Dublin | |
| 2014 | Ben Thomas | Lee Daniels | Dai Wilkins | Jeff Wilkins | Wales | Leamington Spa | |
| 2015 | Phil Dixon | Neal Ridley | Ian Riches | David Bolt | England | Eddlewood | |
| 2016 | Ross Davis | Scott Ruderham | Greg Davis | Malcolm De Sousa | Jersey | Llandrindod Wells | |
| 2017 | Brian Weale | Stuart Weale | David Weale | Robert Weale | Wales | Belmont | |
| 2018 | Jordan Davies | Jack Davies+ | Jarrad Breen | Ross Owen | Wales | Leamington Spa | |
| 2019 | Graham Pringle | John Priestley | Stephen Pringle | James Hogg | Scotland | Ayr Northfield | |
| 2020 & 2021 cancelled due to COVID-19 pandemic | | | | | | | |
| 2022 | Tom McGuinness | David Ross | Kirk Smith | John McGuinness | England | Llandrindod Wells | |
| 2023 | Nigel Beggs | Paul Daly | Ryan Cavan | Simon Martin | Ireland | Ayr | |
| 2024 | Steve Hill | Harry Mycock | Dominic McVittie | Martin Spencer | England | Victoria Park, Leamington Spa | |
| 2025 | John Stevenson | Kevin McDougall | Colin Bonner | Ronnie Duncan | Scotland | Llandrindod Wells | |
| 2026 | Josh Grant | Ashley Clipston | Dan Thornhill | Philip Broughton | England | Ayr | |

== Women's singles ==
| Year | Champion | Nation | Venue | Ref |
|---|---|---|---|---|
| 1972 | Lilian Nicholas | Wales | Plymouth | |
| 1973 | Betty Todd | Scotland | Cardonald, Glasgow | |
| 1974 | Eileen Bell | Ireland | Llandrindod Wells | |
| 1975 | Betty Ireland | Scotland | Colinton, Edinburgh | |
| 1976 | Nessie Burnett | Ireland | Knowle, Bristol | |
| 1977 | Jeannie Croot | England | Woodend, Glasgow | |
| 1978 | Dilys Hemming | Wales | Cardiff | |
| 1979 | Eileen Logan | England | Maxwelltown, Dumfries | |
| 1980 | Lorraine Hawes | England | Leamington Spa | |
| 1981 | Phyllis Derrick | England | Edinburgh | |
| 1982 | Margaret Madden | England | Sophia Gardens, Cardiff | |
| 1983 | Eileen Bell | Ireland | Jordanstown, Belfast | |
| 1984 | Jean Valls | England | Leamington Spa | |
| 1985 | Margaret Johnston | Ireland | Edinburgh | |
| 1986 | Eileen Bell | Ireland | Sophia Gardens, Cardiff | |
| 1987 | Betty Maisey | England | Jordanstown, Belfast | |
| 1988 | Annette Evans | Scotland | Spennymoor | |
| 1989 | Mary Price | England | Ayr | |
| 1990 | Liz Wren | Scotland | Saundersfoot | |
| 1991 | Barbara Till | England | Belmont, Belfast | |
| 1992 | Phillis Nolan | Ireland | Bournemouth | |
| 1993 | Phillis Nolan | Ireland | Ayr | |
| 1994 | Dorothy Prior | England | Llandrindod Wells | |
| 1995 | Betty Morgan | Wales | Portrush | |
| 1996 | Margaret Johnston | Ireland | Leamington Spa | |
| 1997 | Margaret Johnston | Ireland | Ayr | |
| 1998 | Betty Morgan | Wales | Rock Park, Llandrindod Wells | |
| 1999 | Margaret Johnston | Ireland | Belfast | |
| 2000 | Hazel Wilson | Wales | Leamington Spa | |
| 2001 | Ann Anderson | England | Kilmarnock | |
| 2002 | Sue Harriott | England | Llandrindod Wells | |
| 2003 | Betty Morgan | Wales | Ballymena | |
| 2004 | Karen Dawson | Scotland | Les Creux, Jersey | |
| 2005 | Phillis Nolan | Ireland | Royal Leamington Spa | |
| 2006 | Karina Bisson | Jersey | Ayr Northfield | |
| 2007 | Kathy Houston | Scotland | Llandrindod Wells | |
| 2008 | Lindsey Greechan | Jersey | Belfast | |
| 2009 | Maree Todd | Scotland | Les Creux BC, Jersey | |
| 2010 | Lorraine Malloy | Scotland | Worthing | |
| 2011 | Caroline Brown | Scotland | Rock Park BC, Llandrindod Wells | |
| 2012 | Ellen Falkner | England | Swansea | |
| 2013 | Lorna Smith | Scotland | St Vincent BC, Glasgow | |
| 2014 | Mandy Cunningham | Ireland | Les Creux BC, Jersey | |
| 2015 | Natalie Melmore | England | Royal Leamington Spa | |
| 2016 | Judith Wason | Wales | Sighthill, Edinburgh | |
| 2017 | Laura Daniels | Wales | Llandrindod Wells | |
| 2018 | Dee Hoggan | Scotland | Belmont BC, Belfast | |
| 2019 | Laura Welsh | Scotland | Les Creux BC, Jersey | |
| 2020 & 2021 cancelled due to COVID-19 pandemic | | | | |
| 2022 | Margaret Letham | Scotland | Llandrindod Wells | |
| 2023 | Emma Gittins | Wales | Ayr | |
| 2024 | Sarah Kelly | Ireland | Victoria Park, Leamington Spaa | |
| 2025 | Shauna O'Neill | Ireland | Llandrindod Wells | |
| 2026 | Shauna O'Neill | Ireland | Ayr | |

== Women's pairs ==
| Year | Champion | Champion | Nation | Venue | Ref |
|---|---|---|---|---|---|
| 1972 | Mrs I McCulloch | Mrs M Kennedy | Scotland | Plymouth | |
| 1973 | E Chapman | W Thatcher | Wales | Cardonald, Glasgow | |
| 1974 | Betty Norbury | Ivy Burns | England | Llandrindod Wells | |
| 1975 | P Mortimer | E Stanberry + | England | Colinton, Edinburgh | |
| 1976 | Joan Hunt | Betty Taylor | England | Knowle, Bristol | |
| 1977 | Margaret Lockwood | Irene Molyneux | England | Woodend, Glasgow | |
| 1978 | Nan Allely | Daisy Fraser | Ireland | Cardiff | |
| 1979 | Anne Pascoe | Gloria Thomas | England | Maxwelltown, Dumfries | |
| 1980 | Anita Kaye | Alice Steventon | England | Leamington Spa | |
| 1981 | Tilly Costley | Lena Simpson | Ireland | Edinburgh | |
| 1982 | Sophia Simmons | Iris Smith | England | Sophia Gardens, Cardiff | |
| 1983 | Margaret Gray | Annie Knowles | Scotland | Jordanstown, Belfast | |
| 1984 | Chris Wessier | Jean Valls | England | Leamington Spa | |
| 1985 | Margaret Johnston | Muriel McCullough | Ireland | Edinburgh | |
| 1986 | Shirley Proctor | Margaret Pomeroy | Wales | Sophia Gardens, Cardiff | |
| 1987 | Freda Brown | Gladys Lye | England | Jordanstown, Belfast | |
| 1988 | Min Keag | Madge Cheddy | Ireland | Spennymoor | |
| 1989 | Shirley Proctor | Margaret Pomeroy | Wales | Ayr | |
| 1990 | Betty Johnson | Norma Shaw | England | Saundersfoot | |
| 1991 | Marlene Burns | Mair Marquis | Wales | Belmont, Belfast | |
| 1992 | Dora Farman | Joan Campbell | England | Bournemouth | |
| 1993 | Linda Evans | Eileen Thomas | Wales | Ayr | |
| 1994 | Betty Morgan | Julie Davies | Wales | Llandrindod Wells | |
| 1995 | Betty Morgan | Julie Davies | Wales | Portrush | |
| 1996 | Betty Morgan | Julie Davies | Wales | Leamington Spa | |
| 1997 | Ann Clark | Margaret Russell | Scotland | Ayr | |
| 1998 | Ann Beale | Carol Duckworth | England | Rock Park, Llandrindod Wells | |
| 1999 | Ruth Simpson | Dorothy Kane | Ireland | Belfast | |
| 2000 | Jean Morris | Jill Edson | England | Leamington Spa | |
| 2001 | Pauline Morgan | Sue Lagdon | England | Kilmarnock | |
| 2002 | Theresa Reinhardt | Maureen Daley | Ireland | Llandrindod Wells | |
| 2003 | Jenny Davies | Betty Morgan | Wales | Ballymena | |
| 2004 | Gean O'Neil | Karina Bisson | Jersey | Les Creux, Jersey | |
| 2005 | Margaret Campbell | Bernie O'Neill | Ireland | Royal Leamington Spa | |
| 2006 | Gaynor Thomas | Sue Dingle | Jersey | Ayr Northfield | |
| 2007 | Maureen Shaw | Margaret Johnston | Ireland | Llandrindod Wells | |
| 2008 | Delia Flannigan | Angela Uttley | Scotland | Belfast | |
| 2009 | Sue Alexander | Ellen Falkner | England | Les Creux BC, Jersey | |
| 2010 | Alicia Weir | Paula Montgomery | Ireland | Worthing | |
| 2011 | Wendy Price | Betty Morgan | Wales | Rock Park BC, Llandrindod Wells | |
| 2012 | Chris Gowshall | Amy Gowshall | England | Swansea | |
| 2013 | Sue Alexander | Ellen Falkner | England | St Vincent BC, Glasgow | |
| 2014 | Helen Greechan | Sue Dingle | Jersey | Les Creux BC, Jersey | |
| 2015 | Jess Sims | Laura Price | Wales | Royal Leamington Spa | |
| 2016 | Lisa Forey | Barbara Griffith | Wales | Sighthill, Edinburgh | |
| 2017 | Sophie Tolchard | Natalie Chestney | England | Llandrindod Wells | |
| 2018 | Sue Alexander | Ellen Falkner | England | Belmont BC, Belfast | |
| 2019 | Suzanne Cotton | Diana Jones | England | Les Creux BC, Jersey | |
| 2020 & 2021 cancelled due to COVID-19 pandemic | | | | | |
| 2022 | Hannah Smith | Claire Johnson | Scotland | Llandrindod Wells | |
| 2023 | Sophie Tolchard | Harriet Stevens | England | Ayr | |
| 2024 | Alis Butten | Anwen Butten | Wales | Victoria Park, Leamington Spa | |
| 2025 | Lauren Gowen | Tracy Gowen | Wales | Llandrindod Wells | |
| 2026 | Lyn Houston | Rebecca Houston | Scotland | Ayr | |

== Women's triples ==
| Year | Champion | Champion | Champion | Nation | Venue | Ref |
|---|---|---|---|---|---|---|
| 1982 | June Searle | I Briggs | Margaret Poots | England | Sophia Gardens, Cardiff | |
| 1983 | J Jones | M Clark | Norma Shaw | England | Jordanstown, Belfast | |
| 1984 | T Tull | A Stone | D Cave | England | Leamington Spa | |
| 1985 | E Clements | E Morrison | Maureen Mallon | Ireland | Edinburgh | |
| 1986 | Betty Jacob | Wendy Line | Enid Fairhall | England | Sophia Gardens, Cardiff | |
| 1987 | Mary Kirk | Jean Grant | Grace Freeland | Scotland | Jordanstown, Belfast | |
| 1988 | Kathleen Megrath | Hilda Hamilton | Eileen Bell | Ireland | Spennymoor | |
| 1989 | Pam John | Eleanor Schmidt | Doreen Rowlands | Wales | Ayr | |
| 1990 | Joan Evans | Brenda Mills, | Betty Morgan | Wales | Saundersfoot | |
| 1991 | Shirley King | Doreen Rowlands | Mary Davies | Wales | Belmont, Belfast | |
| 1992 | P McAlary | B Dunlop | Margaret Johnston | Ireland | Bournemouth | |
| 1993 | Joan Kyle | Marjory Frost | Irene Bennett | Scotland | Ayr | |
| 1994 | Wendy Buckingham | Val Haste | Jill Polley | England | Llandrindod Wells | |
| 1995 | Chris Winter | Pam Garden | Doreen Hankin | England | Portrush | |
| 1996 | Joyce Morgan | Sue Ritchie | June Larter | England | Leamington Spa | |
| 1997 | T Dawson | E Higston | Chrissie O'Gorman | Ireland | Ayr | |
| 1998 | Irene Wilson | Margaret Stavert | Julie Forrest | Scotland | Rock Park, Llandrindod Wells | |
| 1999 | Margaret Reid | Margaret Wilson | Kath Stevenson | Scotland | Belfast | |
| 2000 | Marie Tormey | Patsy McCann | Pauline Day | Ireland | Leamington Spa | |
| 2001 | Joyce Gregg | Anita Stanney | Audrey Doggart | Ireland | Kilmarnock | |
| 2002 | Muriel Wilkinson | Alicia Weir | Paula Montgomery | Ireland | Llandrindod Wells | |
| 2003 | Margaret Hospkins | Jenny Davies | Betty Morgan | Wales | Ballymena | |
| 2004 | Sheila Phillips | Linda Smith | Sharon Parnell | England | Les Creux, Jersey | |
| 2005 | Jean Meneely | Freda Linberry | Wendy Davies | England | Royal Leamington Spa | |
| 2006 | Sarah Newson | Val Newson | Catherine Popple | England | Ayr Northfield | |
| 2007 | Lynne Whitehead | Jean Baker | Pat Oliver | England | Llandrindod Wells | |
| 2008 | Dorothy Bowers | Sue Alexander | Ellen Falkner | England | Belfast | |
| 2009 | Jean Hartley | Pam John | Gill Miles | Wales | Les Creux BC, Jersey | |
| 2010 | June Wylie | Sheila Hanlon | Peggy Thomson | Scotland | Worthing | |
| 2011 | Jealian Willis | Wendy Morris | Linda Evans | Wales | Rock Park BC, Llandrindod Wells | |
| 2012 | Ruth Rogers | Sophie Tolchard | Natalie Melmore | England | Swansea | |
| 2013 | Tracey O'Connor | Katie Nixon | Lindsey Greechan | Jersey | St Vincent BC, Glasgow | |
| 2014 | Kathleen Bowe | Eleanor Gass | Nicola Bowe | England | Les Creux BC, Jersey | |
| 2015 | Kayleigh Morris | Shirley King | Wendy Price | Wales | Royal Leamington Spa | |
| 2016 | Patricia Ross | Hilary Cavan | Alicia Weir | Ireland | Sighthill, Edinburgh | |
| 2017 | Sophie Tolchard | Lorraine Hackett | Natalie Chestney | England | Llandrindod Wells | |
| 2018 | Chris Mitchell | Julie Jones | Alison Fail | England | Belmont BC, Belfast | |
| 2019 | Lynn Stein | Julie Sword | Donna Comrie | Scotland | Les Creux BC, Jersey | |
| 2020 & 2021 cancelled due to COVID-19 pandemic | | | | | | |
| 2022 | Bridget Hodder | Julie Leake | Penny Cresswell | England | Llandrindod Wells | |
| 2023 | Rachel Mackriell | Nina Allbut | Denise Hodd | England | Ayr | |
| 2024 | Sophie Tolchard | Nicole Rogers | Harriet Stevens | England | Victoria Park, Leamington Spa | |
| 2025 | Kara Lees | Sophie McGrouther | Lynn Lees | Scotland | Llandrindod Wells | |
| 2026 | Rachel Cochrane | Hannah Cochrane | Shauna O'Neill | Ireland | Ayr | |

== Women's fours ==
| Year | Champion | Champion | Champion | Champion | Nation | Venue | Ref |
|---|---|---|---|---|---|---|---|
| 1972 | Elsie Patterson | Senga McCrone | Greta Burnett | Queenie Bailey | Ireland | Plymouth | |
| 1973 | Evelyn Williams | K Lake | E Howells | E Thomas | Wales | Cardonald, Glasgow | |
| 1974 | A Allan | G Beattie | M Gennett | Nancy Gibson | Ireland | Llandrindod Wells | |
| 1975 | A Neal | D Redgrave | B Annison | J Youngs | England | Colinton, Edinburgh | |
| 1976 | Shirley Proctor | Joan Osborne | Margaret Pomeroy | Wales | Knowle, Bristol | | |
| 1977 | P Curtis | J Downes | I Radford | M James | Wales | Woodend, Glasgow | |
| 1978 | J Evans | E Bufton | B Mills | Betty Morgan | Wales | Cardiff | |
| 1979 | Anita Kaye | D Caldwell+ | H Allsop | Alice Steventon | England | Maxwelltown, Dumfries | |
| 1980 | Jess Williams | Margaret Wilson | Margaret Cameron | Isobel Black | Scotland | Leamington Spa | |
| 1981 | Gill Miles | Shirley Proctor | Joan Osborn, Margaret Pomeroy | Wales | Edinburgh | | |
| 1982 | A Barberini | J Downs | M James | Rene Radford | Wales | Sophia Gardens, Cardiff | |
| 1983 | Betty Pettigrew | Sadie Young | Thirza Powell | Margaret Logan | Scotland | Jordanstown, Belfast | |
| 1984 | Pamela Gill | Valerie Chapman | Sybil Symonds | Margaret Doggett | England | Leamington Spa | |
| 1985 | Kathleen Megrath | Hilda Hamilton | Eileen Bell | Ellen Cameron | Ireland | Edinburgh | |
| 1986 | Kathleen Megrath | Hilda Hamilton | D McGill | Eileen Bell | Ireland | Sophia Gardens, Cardiff | |
| 1987 | Pat Marchant | Christine O'Gorman | Marie Barber | Alma Prodohl | Ireland | Jordanstown, Belfast | |
| 1988 | Jean Armstrong | Margaret Gray | Grace Scott | Margaret Shearer | Scotland | Spennymoor | |
| 1989 | Daisy Wallace | Doreen Hall | Adah John | Janet Ackland | Wales | Ayr | |
| 1990 | Daisy Wallace | Doreen Hall | Adah John | Janet Ackland | Wales | Saundersfoot | |
| 1991 | Pam Skinner | Val Mitchell | Joy Watts | Louise Thomas | Wales | Belmont, Belfast | |
| 1992 | Audrey Mullins | Patricia Czarnecki | M Price | Rita Jones | Wales | Bournemouth | |
| 1993 | Audrey Mullins | Patricia Czarnecki | M Price | Rita Jones | Wales | Ayr | |
| 1994 | M Killen | Margaret McGarrity | M Hand | M Martin | Ireland | Llandrindod Wells | |
| 1995 | M Murphy | P Murphy | M Schofield | Phillis Nolan | Ireland | Portrush | |
| 1996 | M Murphy | P Murphy | M Schofield | Phillis Nolan | Ireland | Leamington Spa | |
| 1997 | Norma Beales | Sheila O'Hara | Jan Millard | Mary Price | England | Ayr | |
| 1998 | Marianne Acreman | Marilyn Davies | Merle Cox | Joyce Thornton | Wales | Rock Park, Llandrindod Wells | |
| 1999 | Mary Davies | Julie Davies | Doreen Rowlands | Betty Morgan | Wales | Belfast | |
| 2000 | Ina Culligan | Mary Elliott | Deirdre McCulloch | Maeve Hoey | Ireland | Leamington Spa | |
| 2001 | Ann Haywood | Rose Castle | Gill Carver | Shirley Page | England | Kilmarnock | |
| 2002 | Pauline Mackie | Val Wilson | Ann McKiver | Maureen Fearon | Ireland | Llandrindod Wells | |
| 2003 | Myrtle Le Marquand | Jean Holmes | Gene Vibert | Joan de Gruchy | Jersey | Ballymena | |
| 2004 | Emma Thurston | Mary Malton | Wendy Lutkin | Pat Reynolds | England | Les Creux, Jersey | |
| 2005 | Sarah Newson | Doris Flowers | Val Newson | Catherine Popple | England | Royal Leamington Spa | |
| 2006 | Kathy Moffat | Anne Motroni | Jan Oliver | Mary Ferguson | Scotland | Ayr Northfield | |
| 2007 | Lynne Whitehead | Pauline Marples | Jean Baker | Pat Oliver | England | Llandrindod Wells | |
| 2008 | Sally Newson | Julie Masters | Val Newson | Catherine Popple | England | Belfast | |
| 2009 | Carol Allen | Christine Grimes | Gean O'Neil | Karina Bisson | Jersey | Les Creux BC, Jersey | |
| 2010 | Mary Bayliss | Helen Wilson | Phyllis McCandlish | Kay Curran | Ireland | Worthing | |
| 2011 | Natalie Phillips | Jessica Williams | Wendy Price | Betty Morgan | Wales | Rock Park BC, Llandrindod Wells | |
| 2012 | Tracy Dent | Kirsty Burnett | Chris Gowshall | Amy Gowshall | England | Swansea | |
| 2013 | Doreen Moon | Christine Grimes | Alison Camacho | Gean O'Neil | Jersey | St Vincent BC, Glasgow | |
| 2014 | Molly Morton | Marie Johnston | Liz O'Neill | Ann Gilmour | Scotland | Les Creux BC, Jersey | |
| 2015 | Alison Camacho | Pat De Gruchy | Liz Cole | Fay Le Mottee | Jersey | Royal Leamington Spa | |
| 2016 | Margaret Watts | Jeannie Flippance | Katie Smith | Rebecca Wigfield | England | Sighthill, Edinburgh | |
| 2017 | Doreen Hankin | Glenda Dexter | Norma Beales | Pauline Clark | England | Llandrindod Wells | |
| 2018 | Rhian Jones | Mel Thomas | Carolyn James | Anwen Butten | Wales | Belmont BC, Belfast | |
| 2019 | Sophie Tolchard | Kelly Atkinson | Lorraine Hackett | Natalie Chestney | England | Les Creux BC, Jersey | |
| 2020 & 2021 cancelled due to COVID-19 pandemic | | | | | | | |
| 2022 | Pamela Kenny | Gillian Kirk | Rebekah Weir | Eilidh Weir | Scotland | Llandrindod Wells | |
| 2023 | Louise Whyers | Pearl Flowers | Penny Strong | Annalisa Dunham | England | Ayr | |
| 2024 | Anne Bone | Jane Anderson | Julie Sword | Lynn Stein | Scotland | Victoria Park, Leamington Spa | |
| 2025 | Michelle Meadowcroft | Ellie-Marie Hamblett | Emily Kernick | Kirsty Richards | England | Llandrindod Wells | |
| 2026 | Sara George | Olivia Starr | Laura Holden | Stef Branfield | England | Ayr | |
