= 2022 World Indoor Bowls Championship =

Indoor Bowls Championship

- 44th World Indoor Bowls Championship
- Location: (England) Hopton-on-Sea, Great Yarmouth, Norfolk
- Date: 7–23 January 2022
- Category: World Indoor Championships

The 2022 Just World Indoor Bowls Championship took place at Potters Leisure Resort, Hopton-on-Sea, Great Yarmouth, England, from 7–23 January 2022. The event is organised by the World Bowls Tour, and will be televised by the BBC and streamed live on YouTube.

The Open Singles was won by the sixth seed Les Gillett who overcame five times champion Paul Foster. Gillett won the first set by virtue of overtaking Foster's lead during the final ends. Foster comfortably won the second set before Gillett won the tie break.

Katherine Rednall won a record breaking fourth women's singles title.

In the open pairs Stewart Anderson and Darren Burnett defeated defending champions Mark Dawes and Jamie Chestney to win their second title together. Paul Foster and Alison Merrien won the mixed pairs title.

The continued issues with COVID-19 pandemic caused several problems; South African Thinus Olefse and Israel's Noam Yehudai had to pull out of the Open Singles before the tournament began due to travel restrictions, so their places in the draw were taken by England's Scott Edwards and Scotland's John McCrorie respectively. In the Women's World Matchplay, South Africa's Gillian Young was replaced by Wales's Kerry Packwood, while in the Open Pairs, Israeli duo Beverly Polatinsky and Boaz Markus had to withdraw. On the eve of the tournament, USA's Loren Dion and England's William Moulton tested positive for COVID-19, so had to pull out of the Open Pairs and were replaced by Scott Edwards and Wayne Willgress respectively.

== Winners ==
Event	Winner
Open singles	(England) Les Gillett
Women's singles	(England) Katherine Rednall
Open pairs	(Scotland) Stewart Anderson & (Scotland) Darren Burnett
Mixed pairs	(Scotland) Paul Foster & (Guernsey) Alison Merrien
Open Under-25	(Scotland) Daniel Pool

== Draw and results ==
=== Open singles ===
First round
1	(England) Mark Dawes	11	12
(Wales) Graeme Howard	2	2
16	(England) Simon Skelton	7	8
(England) Wayne Willgress	8	8
9	(England) Mervyn King	2	10	2
(England) Scott Edwards	11	8	0
8	(Scotland) David Gourlay	2	5
(England) Pat Briscoe	10	8
5	(Scotland) Paul Foster	11	7	2
(Scotland) John McCrorie	3	9	0
12	(England) Mark Royal	6	6
(England) Katherine Rednall	6	7
13	(Scotland) Michael Stepney	9	10
(England) Ian Honnor	4	5
4	(England) Robert Paxton	5	3
(England) David Bolt	10	10
3	(Scotland) Stewart Anderson	13	8
(Canada) Erik Galipeau	4	8
14	(England) Jamie Chestney	10	6
(England) Jamie Walker	7	6
11	(Scotland) Darren Burnett	7	5
(Hong Kong) Ken Chan	10	9
6	(England) Les Gillett	7	9
(Scotland) Ronnie Duncan	5	4
7	(England) Greg Harlow	8	10
(England) Danny Denison	6	5
10	(Wales) Jason Greenslade	8	9
(England) Trevor Taylor	2	9
15	(Scotland) Alex Marshall	5	10	2
(Northern Ireland) Mark McPeak	6	4	0
2	(England) Nick Brett	9	10
(United States) Loren Dion	4	4

Second round
1	(England) Dawes	7	3	1
(England) Willgress	5	8	2
9	(England) King	10	7	2
(England) Briscoe	5	9	1
5	(Scotland) Foster	7	2	2
(England) Rednall	3	7	0
13	(Scotland) Stepney	9	10
(England) Bolt	4	4
3	(Scotland) Anderson	7	4	0
14	(England) Chestney	6	5	2
(Hong Kong) Chan	5	4
6	(England) Gillett	8	8
7	(England) Harlow	11	4	2
10	(Wales) Greenslade	4	6	1
15	(Scotland) Marshall	8	8
2	(England) Brett	7	4

Quarter-finals
(England) Willgress	9	11
9	(England) King	5	1
5	(Scotland) Foster	8	4	2
13	(Scotland) Stepney	3	8	0
14	(England) Chestney	10	7	0
6	(England) Gillett	1	8	2
7	(England) Harlow	2	3
15	(Scotland) Marshall	10	10

Semi-finals
(England) Willgress	12	7	1
5	(Scotland) Foster	3	8	2
6	(England) Gillett	10	8
15	(Scotland) Marshall	1	4

Final
5	(Scotland) Foster	7	12	1
6	(England) Gillett	8	4	2

=== Women's singles ===
First round
(Wales) Laura Daniels	9	1
(Guernsey) Alison Merrien	9	11
(Scotland) Carla Banks	10	3	2
(Wales) Kerry Packwood	2	12	0
(Northern Ireland) Sandra Bailie	9	6	2
(England) Sophie Tolchard	5	8	1
(England) Katherine Rednall	10	3	2
(Scotland) Julie Forrest	8	8	1

Semi-finals
(Guernsey) Merrien	4	8	2
(Scotland) Banks	9	6	1
(Northern Ireland) Bailie	6	1
(England) Rednall	10	9

Final
(Guernsey) Merrien	2	2
(England) Rednall	13	14

=== Open pairs ===
First round
(England) Mark Dawes (England) Jamie Chestney	11	11
(England) Mark Burdett (England) Ben Harris	2	2
(England) Simon Skelton (Scotland) Michael Stepney	10	7
(England) Trevor Taylor (England) Stuart Airey	3	6
(England) Mervyn King (Scotland) David Gourlay	4	10	1
(United States) Dean Warmington (England) Scott Edwards	12	6	2
(England) Mark Royal (England) Robert Paxton	6	5
(England) Lee Calver (England) Connor Cinato	7	9
(Scotland) Stewart Anderson (Scotland) Darren Burnett	6	10	2
(Northern Ireland) Mark McPeak (Northern Ireland) Stuart Bennett	9	5	0
(Scotland) Paul Foster (Scotland) Alex Marshall	8	11
(Hong Kong) Lyndon Sham (Hong Kong) Ken Chan	7	8
(England) Les Gillett (Wales) Jason Greenslade	3	9	2
(England) Paul Maynard (Scotland) James Rippey	12	6	0
(England) Nick Brett (England) Greg Harlow	7	12	2
(England) Ashley Nethercliffe (England) Wayne Willgress	8	7	1

Quarter-finals
(England) Dawes (England) Chestney	9	7
(England) Skelton (Scotland) Stepney	2	5
(United States) Warmington (England) Edwards	10	11
(England) Calver (England) Cinato	1	3
(Scotland) Anderson (Scotland) Burnett	10	6	2
(Scotland) Foster (Scotland) Marshall	4	7	0
(England) Gillett (Wales) Greenslade	6	4
(England) Brett (England) Harlow	8	11

Semi-finals
(England) Dawes (England) Chestney	10	11
(United States) Warmington (England) Edwards	2	3
(Scotland) Anderson (Scotland) Burnett	9	10
(England) Brett (England) Harlow	8	5

Final
(England) Dawes (England) Chestney	6	11	0
(Scotland) Anderson (Scotland) Burnett	9	7	2

=== Mixed pairs ===
First Round
(Scotland) Julie Forrest (Scotland) Stewart Anderson	5	8	1
(Northern Ireland) Sandra Bailie (England) Mark Dawes	7	3	2
(Wales) Laura Daniels (Scotland) David Gourlay	3	9	1
(Wales) Kerry Packwood (England) Greg Harlow	8	8	2
(Guernsey) Alison Merrien (Scotland) Paul Foster	8	9
(Scotland) Carla Banks (England) Les Gillett	4	4
(England) Sophie Tolchard (England) Nick Brett	2	1
(England) Katherine Rednall (England) Robert Paxton	12	9

Semi-finals
(Northern Ireland) Bailie (England) Dawes	8	10
(Wales) Packwood (England) Harlow	8	4
(Guernsey) Merrien (Scotland) Foster	9	6	2
(England) Rednall (England) Paxton	6	7	0

Final
(Northern Ireland) Bailie (England) Dawes	10	6	0
(Guernsey) Merrien (Scotland) Foster	8	9	2

=== Open Under 25 ===
Semi-finals
(Scotland) Daniel Pool	6	5	2
(England) William Moulton	5	10	1
(Hong Kong) Lyndon Sham	3	2
(Scotland) Darren Weir	10	10

Final
(Scotland) Pool	8	12
(Scotland) Weir	8	8
