= British Isles Indoor Bowls Championships =

Tournament information
- Sport: Indoor bowls
- Established: men (1967) women (1973)
- Website: British Isles Indoor Bowls Council

The British Isles Indoor Bowls Championships is an annual bowling tournament organised by the British Isles Indoor Bowls Council and held between the respective men's and women's champions from England, Scotland, Wales, combined Ireland and combined Channel Islands (Jersey and Guernsey).

== History ==
The men's singles, pairs and fours events started in 1967, with the triples added for the first time in 1972, the junior singles in 1988 and the senior fours in 2009. The first women's events in singles, pairs and fours started in 1973, with triples added for the first time in 1977 and junior singles in 2002.

The first men's singles champion was legendary England bowler David Bryant CBE in 1967, and Enid Fairhall from the Atherley Bowling Club in Hampshire made it an England double by winning the first women's singles title in 1973.

The tournament is usually held during the indoor season after each of the champions won their respective titles, and runs alongside the annual International Series contested by England, Scotland, Wales and combined Ireland.

== Men's Singles Champions ==
Playing for the John Coles Trophy.

Year	Nation	Champion	Nation	Runner-up	Score	Venue	Ref.
1967	England	David Bryant CBE (Bristol) (1/4)	-	-	-	Crystal Palace	
1968	Wales	W J Mills (Llanishen) (1/2)	-	-	-	Cardiff	
1969	England	David Bryant CBE (Bristol) (2/4)	-	-	-	-	
1970	Wales	W J Mills (Llanishen) (2/2)	-	-	-	Belfast	
1971	Scotland	Willie McQueen (Lanarkshire)	-	-	-	-	
1972	Ireland	Brendan McBrien	-	-	-	-	
1973	England	Bryn Mattravers (Ilminster)	-	-	-	Cardiff	
1974	Scotland	W Wilkie (Dundee)	-	-	-	-	
1975	England	Mal Hughes (Hartlepool)	-	-	-	-	
1976	England	Alan Windsor (Wey Valley)	-	-	-	Rugby	
1977	England	David Bryant CBE (Clevedon) (3/4)	-	-	-	Cardiff	
1978	Scotland	J Blake (West of Scotland)	-	-	-	-	
1979	England	David Bryant CBE (Clevedon) (4/4)	-	-	-	-	
1980	Ireland	Billy McKelvey	-	-	-	-	
1981	Ireland	Jim Baker	-	-	-	Cardiff	
1982	Scotland	J Fullarton (Ardrossan)	-	-	-	Teesside	
1983	Scotland	Bob Sutherland (West Lothian)	-	-	-	Ardrossan	
1984	Ireland	Michael Dunlop	-	-	-	Folkestone	
1985	England	Andy Ross (Longmeadow)	-	-	-	-	
1986	Scotland	Jim Muir (Irvine)	-	-	-	-	
1987	Ireland	David Corkill (Belfast)	-	-	-	Aberdeen	
1988	England	Tony Allcock OBE (Cotswold)	-	-	-	Hartlepool	
1989	Wales	Bryan Kingdon (Llanelli)	-	-	-	Swansea	
1990	Scotland	Graham Robertson (East Lothian)	-	-	-	Prestwick	
1991	England	Andy Thomson (Cyphers) (1/2)	-	-	-	-	
1992	England	Andy Thomson (Cyphers) (2/2)	-	-	-	Teignbridge	
1993	Wales	John Price (Swansea)	-	-	-	Swansea	
1994	Ireland	Jeremy Henry	-	-	-	Rushcliffe	
1995	England	Mervyn King (Pinewood Park)	-	-	-	Rushcliffe	
1996	Wales	John Price (Swansea)	-	-	-	Auchinleck	
1997	Scotland	Robert Marshall (Bainfield)	Ireland	Neil Booth (County Antrim)	21-18	Ballymoney	
1998	England	Robert Newman (Whiteknights)	-	-	-	-	
1999	Scotland	Paul Foster MBE (Irvine) (1/3)	-	-	-	Bournemouth	
2000	Ireland	Neil Booth	-	-	-	Prestwick	
2001	Scotland	Darren Burnett (Arbroath) (1/3)	Ireland	David Corkill (Belfast)	21-13	Belfast	
2002	Ireland	Jonathan Ross (1/2)	Wales	Mike Prosser (Rhondda)	21-17	Swansea	
2003	Ireland	Jonathan Ross (2/2)	Scotland	Stuart Cruickshank (Elgin)	21-11	Thornaby	
2004	England	Billy Jackson (Lincoln & District)	Ireland	Jeremy Henry	21-11	Perth	
2005	Scotland	Darren Burnett (Arbroath) (2/3)	-	-	-	Belfast	
2006	Scotland	Darren Burnett (Arbroath) (3/3)	-	-	-	Llanelli	
2007	Scotland	Iain McLean (Blantyre)	Ch Islands	Nick Donaldson (Guernsey)	21-14	Thornaby	
2008	England	Craig Docherty (Cumbria)	-	-	-	Perth	
2009	Scotland	Stewart Anderson (Auchinleck)	Wales	Ben Thomas (Port Talbot)	21-13	Belfast	
2010	Scotland	Michael Stepney (Elgin)	Ireland	Ian McClure	21-9	Perth	
2011	Scotland	Robert Grant (Lanarkshire)	Ireland	David Corkill (Belfast)	21-11	Stanley	
2012	Ireland	Mark McPeak (Belfast)	Scotland	Iain McLean (Blantyre)	21-18	Swansea	
2013	Ireland	Simon Martin (Belfast)	England	Perry Martin (Swale)	21-16	Stanley	
2014	England	Mark Dawes (Blackpool)	Ch Islands	Todd Priaulx (Guernsey)	21-9	Stanley	
2015	Wales	Damian Doubler (Cardiff)	England	Jamie Walker (Wellingborough)	21-19	Stanley	
2016	Wales	David Harding (Cardiff)	England	Greg Harlow (City of Ely)	21-15	Llanelli	
2017	Scotland	Paul Foster MBE (Prestwick) (2/3)	England	Martin Spencer (Spalding)	21-19	Belfast	
2018	Scotland	Paul Foster MBE (Prestwick) (3/3)	-	-	-	Paisley	
2019	England	Jack Bird (Scarborough)	Scotland	Paul Foster MBE (Prestwick)	21-14	Chelmsford	
2020	England	Andrew Walters (Welford-on-Avon)	Scotland	Connor Milne (Turriff)	21-15	Llanelli	
2021	no championship due to COVID-19						
2022	Ireland	Ian McClure (Ballybrakes)	Scotland	Michael Stepney (Elgin)	21-19	Belfast	
2023	England	Martin Puckett (Dorchester)	Scotland	Connor Milne (Turriff)	21-12	Abbeyview	
2024	Ch Islands	Thomas Greechan (Jersey)	Scotland	Michael Stepney (Elgin)	21-17	Chelmsford	
2025	Wales	Ross Owen (Cynon Valley)	England	Dominic McVittie (Spalding)	21-14	Llanelli	
2026	Ireland	Stephen Kirkwood (Belfast)	Ch Islands	Gary Pitschou (Guernsey)	21-18	Belfast	

== Women's Singles Champions ==
Playing for the Ardrossan Trophy.

Year	Nation	Champion	Nation	Runner-up	Score	Venue	Ref.
1973	England	Enid Fairhill (Atherley)	-	-	-	Cardiff	
1974	Ireland	Ellen Cameron	-	-	-	-	
1975	England	Eileen Smith (Worthing)	-	-	-	-	
1976	Scotland	M Ross (Ardrossan)	-	-	-	Rugby	
1977	Wales	Margaret Pomeroy (Cardiff)	-	-	-	Cardiff	
1978	England	Norma Shaw (Teesside) (1/4)	-	-	-	Tolworth	
1979	England	T Barton (Croydon)	-	-	-	Teesside	
1980	England	Norma Shaw (Teesside) (2/4)	-	-	-	Cardiff	
1981	England	Norma Shaw (Teesside) (3/4)	-	-	-	Ardrossan	
1982	England	Irene Molyneux (Cherwell)	-	-	-	Hartlepool	
1983	Wales	Ann Dainton (Vale of Glamorgan)	-	-	-	Prestwick	
1984	Scotland	Sarah Gourlay (Prestwick)	-	-	-	Swansea	
1985	Scotland	Jeanette Conlan (Midlothian)	-	-	-	Auchinleck	
1986	England	Lynda Jarman (Chesterton)	-	-	-	Darlington	
1987	Ireland	Margaret Johnston (Pr Towns) (1/2)	-	-	-	Auchinleck	
1988	England	Norma Shaw MBE (Teesside) (4/4)	-	-	-	Llanelli	
1989	Scotland	Marion Mungall (Coatbridge)	-	-	-	Glasgow	
1990	Ireland	Margaret Johnston (Pr Towns) (2/2)	-	-	-	Cliftonville	
1991	Scotland	Margaret Letham (Blantyre)	-	-	-	Prestwick	
1992	England	Mary Price (Desborough)	-	-	-	Llanelli	
1993	Wales	Betty Morgan (Radnorshire)	Scotland	Catherine McIntosh (Stonehaven)	21-11	Perth	
1994	Wales	Julie Davies (Ogwr) (1/2)	-	-	-	Blackpool	
1995	England	Mary Price (Desborough)	-	-	-	Ballymoney	
1996	Scotland	Joyce Lindores (Tweedbank) (1/2)	-	-	-	Llanelli	
1997	England	Sandy Hazell (Mote Park)	-	-	-	Perth	
1998	Scotland	Caroline McAllister (Lochwinnoch)	Ireland	Margaret Johnston MBE (Pr Towns)	21-11	Darlington	
1999	England	Chris Hiom (Boston)	-	-	-	Belfast	
2000	Wales	Julie Davies (Ogwr) (2/2)	-	-	-	Swansea	
2001	England	Edna Bessell (Yeovil)	Scotland	Betty Brown (Auchinieck)	21-16	Auchinleck	
2002	Ch Islands	Alison Merrien (Guernsey) (1/6)	Wales	Betty Morgan (Radnorshire)	21-13	Bournemouth	
2003	Scotland	Joyce Lindores (Tweedbank) (2/2)	Ireland	Muriel Wilkinson (County Antrim)	21-8	Belfast	
2004	Scotland	Julie Forrest (Teviotdale) (1/5)	Wales	Betty Morgan (Radnorshire)	21-7	Llanelli	
2005	England	Theresa Darnell-Langton (Lod Vale)	Scotland	Margaret Letham (Blantyre)	21-15	Prestwick	
2006	Ch Islands	Alison Merrien (Guernsey) (2/6)	England	Carol Ashby (Eastbourne)	21-17	South Shields	
2007	England	Carol Ashby (Eastbourne)	Ireland	Catherine McMillen (Belfast)	-	Belfast	
2008	Ch Islands	Alison Merrien (Guernsey) (3/6)	-	-	-	Llanelli	
2009	Ch Islands	Alison Merrien (Guernsey) (4/6)	Scotland	Julie Forrest (Teviotdale)	21-15	Belfast	
2010	Scotland	Julie Forrest (Teviotdale) (2/5)	Ch Islands	Lucy Beere (Guernsey)	21-12	Perth	
2011	Scotland	Julie Forrest (Teviotdale) (3/5)	Ireland	Bernie O'Neill (Pr Towns)	21-11	Stanley	
2012	Ch Islands	Alison Merrien MBE (Guernsey) (5/6)	Scotland	Lynn Stein (East Fife)	21-13	Swansea	
2013	England	Rebecca Field (Norfolk)	Scotland	Julie Forrest (Teviotdale)	21-15	Stanley	
2014	Scotland	Lynn Stein (East Fife)	Ch Islands	Alison Merrien MBE (Guernsey)	21-13	Stanley	
2015	Ch Islands	Alison Merrien MBE (Guernsey) (6/6)	Ireland	Chloe Watson (Belfast)	21-11	Stanley	
2016	England	Katherine Rednall (Ipswich) (1/2)	Scotland	Lesley Doig (East Fife)	21-19	Llanelli	
2017	Scotland	Caroline Brown (Blantyre) (1/2)	Ireland	Chloe Watson (Belfast)	21-15	Belfast	
2018	Scotland	Caroline Brown (Blantyre) (2/2)	Ch Islands	Alison Merrien MBE (Guernsey)	21-4	Paisley	
2019	Scotland	Julie Forrest (Teviotdale) (4/5)	Ch Islands	Alison Merrien MBE (Guernsey)	21-17	Chelmsford	
2020	Scotland	Julie Forrest (Teviotdale) (5/5)	Ch Islands	Alison Merrien MBE (Guernsey)	21-13	Llanelli	
2021	no championship due to COVID-19						
2022	Wales	Amy Williams (Newport)	Ch Islands	Alison Merrien MBE (Guernsey)	21-15	Belfast	
2023	England	Kirsty Hembrow (Ilminster)	Wales	Lowri Powell (Taff Ely)	21-12	Abbeyview	
2024	Ch Islands	Alison Merrien MBE (Guernsey) (7/7)	Scotland	Julie Forrest (Teviotdale)	21-16	Chelmsford	
2025	England	Katherine Rednall (Norfolk) (2/2)	Ch Islands	Alison Merrien MBE (Guernsey)	21-10	Llanelli	
2026	England	Sian Honnor (Oyster)	Ch Islands	Alison Merrien MBE (Guernsey)	21-18	Belfast	
