= 2026 World Indoor Bowls Championship =

World Indoor Bowls Championship

- 48th World Indoor Bowls Championship
- Location: (England) Hopton-on-Sea, Great Yarmouth, Norfolk
- Date: 9–25 January 2026
- Category: World Indoor Championships

The 2026 World Indoor Bowls Championship, sponsored by Ambassador Cruise Line, was the 2026 edition of the World Indoor Bowls Championships, held at Potters Resorts, Hopton-on-Sea, Great Yarmouth, England, from 9 to 25 January 2026.

The event was organised by the World Bowls Tour and televised by the BBC and World Bowls Tour via its YouTube and Facebook channels.

Having been runner-up in 2025, England's Robert Paxton went one better and won the open singles title, defeating Paul Foster in the final which went all the way to a third tie-break end after both sets were tied. It was Paxton's second open singles championship following his success at the 2020 event.

England's Katherine Rednall took an afternoon off her job as a teacher to come from a set down against Nicole Rogers to win her seventh ladies singles title on a tie-break. Despite winning the title three years in a row from 2022 to 2024, she had to qualify for the 2026 event and said her victory proved that qualifying for the ladies singles was important for its credibility.

Scotland's Paul Foster and Alex Marshall won a fifth pairs title together, and their first since 2019, by defeating fellow Scots Stewart Anderson and Darren Burnett. Victory moved Foster and Marshall to one win behind England's Tony Allcock and David Bryant, who won the title six times between 1986 and 1992.

On her debut at the event, Northern Ireland's Chloe Wilson teamed up with England's Jamie Walker to win the mixed pairs title, defeating the English pair of Les Gillett and Emily Kernick in the final. Wilson became the first Irish player to win the title and emulated 2025 winner Beth Riva by claiming victory at her first attempt. Walker also claimed his first mixed pairs title after winning the singles event as a qualifier in 2023.

After making its debut as an invitational event in 2025, the four-player masters championship returned in 2026, with the players winning through qualifying events held at Cambridge Chesterton, County Antrim, West Lothian and Hartlepool. Russell Bewick from Hartlepool Indoor Bowls Club won the title, defeating Danny Denison in the final.

== Winners ==
Event	Winner
Open singles	(England) Robert Paxton
Ladies singles	(England) Katherine Rednall
Open pairs	(Scotland) Paul Foster & Alex Marshall
Mixed pairs	(England) Jamie Walker & (Northern Ireland) Chloe Wilson
Masters	(England) Russell Bewick

== Draw and results ==
=== Open singles ===
First round
1	(Scotland) Jason Banks	9	13
(South Africa) Wayne Roberts	6	1
16	(England) Aaron Johnson	10	10
(England) Mikey Titcombe	5	7
9	(England) Nick Brett	9	14
(New Zealand) Clayton Simpson	4	1
8	(England) Mark Dawes	4	9	2
(Australia) Jack McShane	6	7	1
5	(England) Les Gillett	9	11
(New Zealand) Ali Forsyth	4	6
12	(Scotland) Alex Marshall	13	8
(Hong Kong) Dorothy Yu	0	4
13	(Scotland) Michael Stepney	8	5
(England) Greg Harlow	9	9
4	(Scotland) Paul Foster	11	10
(England) Mark Higgins	0	1
3	(England) Robert Paxton	10	11
(Israel) Zvika Hadar	4	1
14	(England) Mervyn King	7	3	2
(England) Paul Hartley	5	9	1
11	(England) Wayne Willgress	0	3
(England) Martin Puckett	13	12
6	(Scotland) David Gourlay	5	11	1
(Australia) Scott Walker	8	5	2
7	(England) Jamie Walker	8	5	2
(England) Brett Arkley	3	10	1
10	(Scotland) Darren Burnett	12	4	2
(England) James Baxter+	3	6	1
15	(Guernsey) Jason Greenslade	6	5
(England) Tom Holmes	7	10
2	(Scotland) Stewart Anderson	12	2	2
(Scotland) Martyn Rice	5	8	1

Second round
1	(Scotland) Banks	8	7	2
16	(England) Johnson	4	11	1
9	(England) Brett	10	4	2
8	(England) Dawes	3	9	0
5	(England) Gillett	10	11
12	(Scotland) Marshall	5	7
(England) Harlow	2	6
4	(Scotland) Foster	11	8
3	(England) Paxton	7	6
14	(England) King	5	6
(England) Puckett	11	11
(Australia) Walker	5	5
7	(England) Walker	5	9	1
10	(Scotland) Burnett	10	7	2
(England) Holmes	4	8	1
2	(Scotland) Anderson	9	4	2

Quarter-finals
1	(Scotland) Banks	10	9
9	(England) Brett	4	5
5	(England) Gillett	3	4
4	(Scotland) Foster	12	12
3	(England) Paxton	11	7
(England) Puckett	2	6
10	(Scotland) Burnett	8	5	2
2	(Scotland) Anderson	5	10	0

Semi-finals
1	(Scotland) Banks	5	3
4	(Scotland) Foster	8	10
3	(England) Paxton	9	6	2
10	(Scotland) Burnett	3	11	0

Final
4	(Scotland) Foster	11	8	1
3	(England) Paxton	11	8	2

+James Baxter was a late replacement in the first round of the singles after the withdrawal of Belfast qualifier Lloyd Milligan.

=== Ladies Singles ===
First round
(Scotland) Julie Forrest	5	12	0
(Scotland) Beth Riva	10	2	2
(England) Nicole Rogers	6	7
(England) Emily Kernick	4	7
(Northern Ireland) Chloe Wilson	3	1
(Scotland) Lesley Doig	8	9
(England) Katherine Rednall	7	8
(New Zealand) Selina Goddard	4	4

Semi-finals
(Scotland) Riva	2	7
(England) Rogers	7	8
(Scotland) Doig	6	5
(England) Rednall	8	9

Final
(England) Rogers	12	4	0
(England) Rednall	7	9	2

=== Open Pairs ===
First round
(Scotland) Jason Banks (Scotland) Michael Stepney
bye
(England) Andy Kyle (Wales) Ryan Davies	12	11
(Australia) Doug Ellis (Australia) Trevor Verran	3	1
(Scotland) Paul Kane (Scotland) John Orr	9	6	2
(South Africa) Jason Evans (South Africa) Shaun Thomas	2	7	1
(England) Les Gillett (England) Wayne Willgress
bye
(Scotland) Paul Foster (Scotland) Alex Marshall
bye
(England) Finlay Williamson (England) Ryan Whitlock	9	12
(Canada) Erik Galipeau (Canada) David Llewellyn	7	6
(England) Jamie Walker (England) Mark Dawes
bye
(England) Paul Hartley (England) David Bolt	10	10
(New Zealand) Garry Cotter (New Zealand) Anthony Oullett	5	4
(England) Jon Wilson (England) Sammy Tindall	13	14
(Israel) Noam Yehudai (Israel) Asaff Iron	1	0
(Scotland) David Gourlay (England) Mervyn King
bye
(England) Robert Paxton (Guernsey) Jason Greenslade
bye
(Australia) Wade Clatworthy (Australia) Scott Walker	9	3	2
(Wales) Ross Owen (Wales) Danny Davies	6	10	0
(England) Nick Brett (England) Aaron Johnson
bye
(Hong Kong) Philip Chan (Hong Kong) Andy Tung	9	10
(United States) Daniel Gorelick (United States) Bill Brault	3	7
(Scotland) Stewart Anderson (Scotland) Darren Burnett
bye
(Scotland) Colin Banks (Scotland) Carla Banks	9	11
(England) Connor Chamberlain (England) Ben Harris	9	1

Second round
(Scotland) Banks (Scotland) Stepney	10	2	2
(England) Kyle (Wales) Davies	1	10	0
(Scotland) Kane (Scotland) Orr	6	10	2
(England) Gillett (England) Willgress	11	7	1
(Scotland) Foster (Scotland) Marshall	11	11
(England) Williamson (England) Whitlock	10	4
(England) Walker (England) Dawes	7	8	2
(England) Hartley (England) Bolt	9	4	0
(England) Wilson (England) Tindall	9	4	2
(Scotland) Gourlay (England) King	5	9	1
(England) Paxton (Guernsey) Greenslade	10	6	2
(Australia) Clatworthy (Australia) Walker	5	9	1
(England) Brett (England) Johnson	8	9
(Hong Kong) Chan (Hong Kong) Tung	6	3
(Scotland) Anderson (Scotland) Burnett	8	8
(Scotland) Banks (Scotland) Banks	3	3

Quarter-finals
(Scotland) Banks (Scotland) Stepney	8	7
(Scotland) Kane (Scotland) Orr	7	3
(Scotland) Foster (Scotland) Marshall	10	6	2
(England) Walker (England) Dawes	7	7	0
(England) Wilson (England) Tindall	6	10
(England) Paxton (Guernsey) Greenslade	5	4
(England) Brett (England) Johnson	1	8	0
(Scotland) Anderson (Scotland) Burnett	11	6	2

Semi-finals
(Scotland) Banks (Scotland) Stepney	7	2
(Scotland) Foster (Scotland) Marshall	7	7
(England) Wilson (England) Tindall	4	3
(Scotland) Anderson (Scotland) Burnett	9	9

Final
(Scotland) Foster (Scotland) Marshall	11	12
(Scotland) Anderson (Scotland) Burnett	5	7

=== Mixed Pairs ===
First Round
(Scotland) Jason Banks (Scotland) Beth Riva	4	4
(England) Mark Dawes (Scotland) Julie Forrest	10	8
(England) Jamie Walker (Northern Ireland) Chloe Wilson	7	7
(Scotland) Stewart Anderson (Scotland) Lesley Doig	7	4
(England) Robert Paxton (England) Katherine Rednall	5	5
(England) Les Gillett (England) Emily Kernick	11	11
(Scotland) David Gourlay (England) Nicole Rogers	3	6
(Scotland) Paul Foster (New Zealand) Selina Goddard	11	10

Semi-finals
(England) Dawes (Scotland) Forrest	5	9	0
(England) Walker (Northern Ireland) Wilson	10	6	2
(England) Gillett (England) Kernick	8	8
(Scotland) Foster (New Zealand) Goddard	7	3

Final
(England) Walker (Northern Ireland) Wilson	7	9
(England) Gillett (England) Kernick	7	8

=== Masters ===
Semi-finals
(England) Danny Denison	13	10
(Northern Ireland) John R Nicholl	1	2
(Scotland) Richard Mark	1	1
(England) Russell Bewick	15	10

Final
(England) Denison	5	2
(England) Bewick	10	12
