= 2019 World Indoor Bowls Championship =

Bowls championship held in Hopton-on-Sea, Great Yarmouth, Norfolk

- 41st World Indoor Bowls Championship
- Location: (England) Hopton-on-Sea, Great Yarmouth, Norfolk
- Date: 10–27 January 2019
- Category: World Indoor Championships

The 2019 Just World Indoor Bowls Championship was held at Potters Leisure Resort, Hopton-on-Sea, Great Yarmouth, England, from 10 to 27 January 2019. The event is organised by the World Bowls Tour.

Stewart Anderson won his second open singles title after defeating surprise qualifier Simon Skelton in the final. Julie Forrest of Scotland defeated Alison Merrien of Guernsey to win the women's singles.

Alex Marshall and Paul Foster won the open pairs title for the fourth time as a pair and the sixth and fifth time respectively. Robert Paxton and Ellen Falkner won the mixed pairs event.

== Winners ==
Event	Winner
Open Singles	(Scotland) Stewart Anderson
Women's Singles	(Scotland) Julie Forrest
Open Pairs	(Scotland) Paul Foster & (Scotland) Alex Marshall
Mixed Pairs	(England) Robert Paxton & (England) Ellen Falkner
Open Under-25 Singles	(Scotland) John Orr

== Draw and results ==
=== Open singles ===
First round
1	(England) Mark Dawes	6	8
(Northern Ireland) Graham McKee	6	3
16	(Scotland) Michael Stepney	10	3	2
(England) Gary R Smith	6	12	1
9	(Scotland) Stewart Anderson	12	9
(Scotland) Colin Walker	6	8
8	(England) Jamie Chestney	10	10
(England) James Rippey	4	4
5	(Scotland) Paul Foster	6	2	2
(Wales) Damian Doubler	4	8	1
12	(England) Les Gillett	7	9
(England) Paul Coleman	5	1
13	(England) Mark Royal	6	10	1
(England) Scott Edwards	7	4	2
4	(England) Robert Paxton	8	7
(England) Ian McIntosh	2	4
3	(Scotland) David Gourlay	7	5
(England) Simon Skelton	8	8
14	(Wales) Jason Greenslade	9	7	2
(South Africa) Craig Rimmington	4	9	0
11	(England) Mervyn King	12	3	2
(England) Shaun Jones	2	8	0
6	(Scotland) Darren Burnett	6	8	2
(Scotland) Andrew Barker	9	3	0
7	(England) Nick Brett	9	6
(England) Andy Squire	3	4
10	(Scotland) Alex Marshall	11	7	2
(New Zealand) Ray Martin	2	8	0
15	(England) Andy Thomson	7	7	2
(England) Wayne Willgress	4	9	0
2	(England) Greg Harlow	11	9
(Australia) Brendan Egan	6	5

Second round
1	(England) Dawes	9	7
16	(Scotland) Stepney	6	7
9	(Scotland) Anderson	12	6
8	(England) Chestney	5	6
5	(Scotland) Foster	4	9	0
12	(England) Gillett	5	2	2
(England) Edwards	7	7
4	(England) Paxton	3	5
(England) Skelton	6	6
14	(Wales) Greenslade	6	5
11	(England) King	4	7
6	(Scotland) Burnett	11	7
7	(England) Brett	12	4	2
10	(Scotland) Marshall	0	9	1
15	(England) Thomson	1	5
2	(England) Harlow	10	10

Quarter-finals
1	(England) Dawes	7	6
9	(Scotland) Anderson	8	11
12	(England) Gillett	10	10
(England) Edwards	2	9
(England) Skelton	6	6
6	(Scotland) Burnett	6	5
7	(England) Brett	9	9
2	(England) Harlow	3	1

Semi-finals
9	(Scotland) Anderson	8	8
12	(England) Gillett	6	7
(England) Skelton	2	8	2
7	(England) Brett	9	7	1

Final
9	(Scotland) Anderson	11	6	2
(England) Skelton	5	8	0

=== Women's singles ===
First round
(England) Katherine Rednall	9	11
(Scotland) Melanie Darroch	9	2
(Wales) Kerry Packwood	2	3
(Scotland) Julie Forrest	10	10
(New Zealand) Helen Carman	5	4
(Guernsey) Alison Merrien	10	12
(England) Ellen Falkner	9	11
(England) Janice Gower	7	9

Semi-finals
(England) Rednall	11	7	1
(Scotland) Forrest	2	8	2
(Guernsey) Merrien	9	9
(England) Falkner	4	3

Final
(Scotland) Forrest	8	9
(Guernsey) Merrien	7	8

=== Open pairs ===
First round

Quarter-finals

Semi-finals

Final

1
(England) Jamie Chestney

(England) Mark Dawes

bye

1
(England) Chestney

(England) Dawes

3
6

5
(Scotland) Alex Marshall

(Scotland) Paul Foster

7
4
2

5
(Scotland) Foster

(Scotland) Marshall

6
6

(Wales) Damian Doubler

(Wales) Daniel Salmon

6
9
0

5
(Scotland) Foster

(Scotland) Marshall

2
8
2

3
(England) Mervyn King

(Scotland) David Gourlay

(Scotland) Walker

(Scotland) Duncan

9
4
1

bye

3
(Scotland) Gourlay

(England) King

4
6

7
(England) Les Gillett

(Wales) Jason Greenslade

5
4
1

(Scotland) Walker

(Scotland) Duncan

7
8

(Scotland) Colin Walker

(Scotland) Ronnie Duncan

4
5
2

5
(Scotland) Foster

(Scotland) Marshall

8
13

4
(England) Robert Paxton

(Scotland) Michael Stepney

2
(England) Harlow

(England) Brett

6
13

bye

4
(England) Paxton

(Scotland) Stepney

6
5

8
(England) Andy Thomson

(England) Mark Royal

4
6

8
(England) Thomson

(England) Royal

7
5

(England) Edward Elmore

(England) Robert Elmore

4
4

8
(England) Thomson

(England) Royal

3
2

2
(England) Nick Brett

(England) Greg Harlow

2
(England) Harlow

(England) Brett

5
7

bye

2
(England) Harlow

(England) Brett

6
9

6
(Scotland) Darren Burnett

(Scotland) Stewart Anderson

4
7
0

(Australia) Rankin

(Australia) McIlroy

5
2

(Australia) David Rankin

(Australia) Kyle McIlroy

6
3
2

=== Mixed pairs ===
Quarter-finals

Semi-finals

Final

(England) Greg Harlow

(England) Katherine Rednall

1
5

(England) Jamie Chestney

(Scotland) Lesley Doig

8
8

(England) Chestney
(Scotland) Doig
4
5

(England) Brett
(New Zealand) Carman
6
6

(Scotland) Stewart Anderson

(Guernsey) Alison Merrien

2
4

(England) Nick Brett

(New Zealand) Helen Carman

13
7

(England) Brett
(New Zealand) Carman
15
3
0

(England) Paxton
(England) Falkner
1
10
2

(Scotland) Darren Burnett

(Scotland) Julie Forrest

5
4

(England) Robert Paxton

(England) Ellen Falkner

7
7

(England) Paxton
(England) Falkner
8
5
2

(Scotland) Foster
(England) Gower
4
6
1

(Scotland) Paul Foster

(England) Janice Gower

4
9

(Scotland) David Gourlay

(Scotland) Melanie Darroch

4
1

=== Open Under 25 Singles ===
Semi-finals
(Northern Ireland) Chloe Watson	3	2
(England) Jordan Philpott	13	7
(New Zealand) Dean Drummond	2	5
(Scotland) John Orr	11	9

Final
(England) Philpott	5	6
(Scotland) Orr	10	8
