= 2024 World Indoor Bowls Championship =

World Indoor Bowls Championship

- 46th World Indoor Bowls Championship
- Location: (England) Hopton-on-Sea, Great Yarmouth, Norfolk
- Date: 5–21 January 2024
- Category: World Indoor Championships

The 2024 World Indoor Bowls Championship was the 2024 edition of the World Indoor Bowls Championship, held at Potters Leisure Resort, Hopton-on-Sea, Great Yarmouth, England, from 5-21 January 2024. The event is organised by the World Bowls Tour and will be televised by the BBC and YouTube. The event is being sponsored for the second consecutive year by Imagine Cruising.

Jamie Walker and Katherine Rednall were the men's and women's defending champions respectively.

In an all-Scottish final, two-time champion and number 4 seed Stewart Anderson beat the six-time champion Alex Marshall MBE. Marshall received a wild card to compete and was unseeded because his form had dropped over the last few years but produced outstanding performances to reach the final, including a faultless semi-final win over friend and rival Paul Foster MBE. Anderson defeated another wild card and debutant Harry Goodwin in the other semi-final before sealing the win over Marshall in the final.

Katherine Rednall started her year in fine form, winning her sixth singles title at the championships, defeating Julie Forrest in a close final. Forrest was always in control in the first set before Rednall dominated the second to force a tie break. Rednall's win was largely due to her choosing short lengths (23 metres) throughout the second set and tie break ends.

In another all-Scottish final Stewart Anderson and Darren Burnett won the open pairs for the third time defeating Paul Foster and Jason Banks. Nick Brett and Julie Forrest, bowling together for the first time in this event, won the mixed pairs for their third and second mixed titles respectively.

Darren Weir completed a Scottish dominated championships with a comprehensive victory over Rebecca Moorbey in the Under-25 event.

== Winners ==
Event	Winner
Open Singles	(Scotland) Stewart Anderson
Ladies Singles	(England) Katherine Rednall
Open Pairs	(Scotland) Stewart Anderson & Darren Burnett
Mixed Pairs	(England) Nick Brett & (Scotland) Julie Forrest
World Under-25s	(Scotland) Darren Weir

== Draw and results ==
=== Open singles ===
First round
1	(England) Jamie Walker	7	9
(Scotland) Iain McLean	4	2
16	(Scotland) Jason Banks	10	8
(Australia) Blake Nairn	7	4
9	(England) Wayne Willgress	7	6	1
(England) Harry Goodwin	4	10	2
8	(Scotland) David Gourlay	9	7
(Wales) Daniel Salmon	3	6
5	(England) Robert Paxton	11	9
(England) Philip Last	2	7
12	(Scotland) Darren Burnett	3	13	0
(Scotland) Darren Weir	10	8	2
13	(England) Jamie Chestney	5	10	0
(England) Jon Wilson	8	4	2
4	(Scotland) Stewart Anderson	7	8
(South Africa) Wayne Roberts	5	3
3	(England) Les Gillett	10	7
(England) David Bolt	5	7
14	(England) Mervyn King	12	7
(Canada) Dylan Jacobs	4	6
11	(England) Greg Harlow	8	3
(Scotland) Alex Marshall	9	9
6	(England) Mark Dawes	11	5	1
(New Zealand) Martin Kreft	4	6	2
7	(England) Nick Brett	13	9
(Northern Ireland) Alastair Coleman	2	6
10	(Guernsey) Jason Greenslade	5	10	1
(Scotland) Billy Mellors	7	4	2
15	(Scotland) Michael Stepney	14	13
(Hong Kong) Desmond Lai	1	4
2	(Scotland) Paul Foster	6	8
(Australia) Aron Sherriff	4	3

Second round
1	(England) Walker	7	7
16	(Scotland) Banks	6	5
(England) Goodwin	8	4	2
8	(Scotland) Gourlay	7	7	0
5	(England) Paxton	10	8	2
(Scotland) Weir	3	11	0
(England) Wilson	4	2
4	(Scotland) Anderson	10	12
3	(England) Gillett	8	9
14	(England) King	7	8
(Scotland) Marshall	8	8	2
(New Zealand) Kreft	3	10	0
7	(England) Brett	6	9
(Scotland) Mellors	5	7
15	(Scotland) Stepney	7	4
2	(Scotland) Foster	10	8

Quarter-finals
1	(England) Walker	9	6	1
(England) Goodwin	3	10	2
5	(England) Paxton	5	1
4	(Scotland) Anderson	8	9
3	(England) Gillett	8	3	1
(Scotland) Marshall	4	8	2
7	(England) Brett	3	2
2	(Scotland) Foster	11	6

Semi-finals
(England) Goodwin	8	4
4	(Scotland) Anderson	9	8
(Scotland) Marshall	6	10	2
2	(Scotland) Foster	7	5	0

Final
4	(Scotland) Anderson	12	13
(Scotland) Marshall	7	10

=== Ladies Singles ===
First round
(England) Katherine Rednall	11	6
(England) Annalisa Dunham	5	6
(Scotland) Ailsa Robertson	2	0
(England) Nicole Rogers	10	11
(United States) Giulia Gallo	4	7
(Wales) Ceri Ann Glen	9	9
(Wales) Lauren Gowen	10	7	1
(Scotland) Julie Forrest	7	9	2

Semi-finals
(England) Rednall	7	4	2
(England) Rogers	5	8	0
(Wales) Glen	5	8
(Scotland) Forrest	9	9

Final
(England) Rednall	5	12	2
(Scotland) Forrest	9	5	1

=== Open Pairs ===
First round
(South Africa) Peter Harvey (South Africa) Kevin Douglas	5	7
(Wales) Sara Nicholls (Wales) Ross Owen	5	8
(Northern Ireland) Mark McPeak (Northern Ireland) Stuart Bennett	12	8
(Canada) Rick Lyons (Canada) Jake Masterson	1	2
(Hong Kong) Alan Yuen (Hong Kong) Timmy Lui	7	4
(England) Ian Catchpole (England) Aaron Johnson	9	7
(England) Paul Wallace (England) Kenny Johnstone	11	4	2
(United States) Jesse May (United States) Rachel Marcuson	4	10	1
(England) Tom Warner (England) Perry Martin	5	9	2
(New Zealand) Martin Kreft (New Zealand) Richard Corry	7	5	0
(Scotland) Ronnie Duncan (Scotland) Colin Walker	4	11	2
(Israel) David Hadar (Israel) Zvika Hadar	7	6	0

Second round
(England) Greg Harlow (England) Nick Brett	10	10
(England) Paul Nicholls (England) Tim Stone	5	5
(England) Mark Dawes (England) Jamie Chestney	9	9
(Wales) Nicholls (Wales) Owen	2	3
(England) Mervyn King (Scotland) David Gourlay	9	4	1
(Northern Ireland) McPeak (Northern Ireland) Bennett	8	7	2
(Scotland) Stewart Anderson (Scotland) Darren Burnett	12	10
(England) Catchpole (England) Johnson	0	4
(England) Les Gillett (England) Wayne Willgress	6	7
(England) Wallace (England) Johnstone	10	7
(England) Robert Paxton (England) Jamie Walker	8	8
(England) Warner (England) Martin	3	4
(Scotland) Michael Stepney (Guernsey) Jason Greenslade	8	9
(Scotland) Duncan (Scotland) Walker	7	5
(Scotland) Jason Banks (Scotland) Paul Foster	9	16
(Australia) Chris Carruthers (Australia) Justin Wright	8	4

Quarter-finals
(England) Harlow (England) Brett	7	4
(England) Dawes (England) Chestney	8	10
(Northern Ireland) McPeak (Northern Ireland) Bennett	4	11	1
(Scotland) Anderson (Scotland) Burnett	11	5	2
(England) Wallace (England) Johnstone	6	5
(England) Paxton (England) Walker	9	7
(Scotland) Stepney (Guernsey) Greenslade	6	6
(Scotland) Banks (Scotland) Foster	8	7

Semi-finals
(Scotland) Anderson (Scotland) Burnett	8	9
(England) Dawes (England) Chestney	6	8
(England) Paxton (England) Walker	9	5	1
(Scotland) Banks (Scotland) Foster	6	10	2

Final
(Scotland) Anderson (Scotland) Burnett	8	11
(Scotland) Banks (Scotland) Foster	5	5

=== Mixed Pairs ===
First Round
(Scotland) Stewart Anderson (Wales) Ceri Ann Glen	9	7
(Scotland) David Gourlay (England) Annalisa Dunham	5	5
(Scotland) Paul Foster (Wales) Lauren Gowen	5	5
(England) Mark Dawes (United States) Giulia Gallo	7	6
(England) Wayne Willgress (England) Nicole Rogers	9	12
(England) Les Gillett (England) Katherine Rednall	4	2
(England) Nick Brett (Scotland) Julie Forrest	8	6
(England) Robert Paxton (Scotland) Ailsa Robertson	7	6

Semi-finals
(Scotland) Anderson (Wales) Glen	4	9	2
(England) Dawes (United States) Gallo	8	4	1
(England) Willgress (England) Rogers	5	5
(England) Brett (Scotland) Forrest	7	7

Final
(Scotland) Anderson (Wales) Glen	2	9	0
(England) Brett (Scotland) Forrest	12	8	2

=== Open Under 25 ===
Semi-finals
(Scotland) Daniel Pool	6	11	0
(England) Rebecca Moorbey	8	2	2
(Scotland) Darren Weir	12	9
(Australia) Jack East	5	5

Final
(England) Moorbey	3	4
(Scotland) Weir	13	16
