= 2017 World Indoor Bowls Championship =

Bowls championship held in Great Yarmouth, Norfolk

- 39th World Indoor Bowls Championship
- Location: (England) Great Yarmouth, Norfolk
- Date: 13–29 January 2017
- Category: World Indoor Championships

The 2017 Just World Indoor Bowls Championship was held at Potters Leisure Resort, Hopton on Sea, Great Yarmouth, England, on 13–29 January 2017.

Paul Foster of Scotland won the open singles to claim his fifth world singles title and Katherine Rednall won her second women's singles crown.

Jason Greenslade of Wales and Les Gillett of England won the Open Pairs whilst Nick Brett and Claire Johnston won the mixed pairs.

Australia's Ellen Ryan became the first female winner of the Open Under 25 Singles.

== Winners ==
Event	Winner
Open Singles	(Scotland) Paul Foster
Women's Singles	(England) Katherine Rednall
Open Pairs	(Wales) Jason Greenslade & (England) Les Gillett
Mixed Pairs	(England) Nick Brett & (Scotland) Claire Johnston
Open Under-25 Singles	(Australia) Ellen Ryan

== Draw and results ==
=== Open singles ===
First round
1	(England) Nick Brett	10	8
(Northern Ireland) Andrew Kyle	5	8
16	(England) Mark Dawes	9	7	1
(Scotland) Charles Bence	4	10	2
9	(Scotland) Stewart Anderson	13	7
(Scotland) Julie Forrest	3	2
8	(England) Andy Thomson	4	3
(Northern Ireland) Graham McKee	9	11
5	(Scotland) David Gourlay	9	7
(England) Chris Gale	4	6
12	(Wales) Jason Greenslade	6	8
(United States) Neil Furman	7	10
13	(Scotland) Jonathan Ross	6	9	0
(England) James Rippey	9	6	2
4	(England) Greg Harlow	10	10
(England) Anthony Webb	5	9
3	(England) Robert Paxton	8	9
(England) Billy Jackson	2	3
14	(England) Jamie Chestney	15	12
(Scotland) Paul Hay	1	3
11	(England) Mark Royal	4	7
(New Zealand) Debbie Wilford	10	7
6	(Scotland) Paul Foster	9	8
(England) Michael Cheeseman	4	6
7	(Scotland) Darren Burnett	12	11
(Australia) Paul Butler	0	5
10	(England) Mervyn King	10	9
(England) Janice Gower	3	7
15	(England) Les Gillett	7	10
(England) Tom Warner	6	6
2	(Scotland) Alex Marshall	13	6
(Wales) Robert Chisholm	1	4

Second round
1	(England) Brett	5	10	2
(Scotland) Bence	7	4	1
9	(Scotland) Anderson	11	12
(Northern Ireland) McKee	4	2
5	(Scotland) Gourlay	9	13
(United States) Furman	5	4
(England) Rippey	3	11	1
4	(England) Harlow	9	10	2
3	(England) Paxton	6	5
14	(England) Chestney	8	6
(New Zealand) Wilford	3	3
6	(Scotland) Foster	11	10
7	(Scotland) Burnett	7	6
10	(England) King	5	6
15	(England) Gillett	6	8
2	(Scotland) Marshall	4	6

Quarter-finals
1	(England) Brett	5	2
9	(Scotland) Anderson	10	10
5	(Scotland) Gourlay	8	4	1
4	(England) Harlow	5	10	2
14	(England) Chestney	10	4	1
6	(Scotland) Foster	6	10	2
7	(Scotland) Burnett	4	4
15	(England) Gillett	8	8

Semi-finals
9	(Scotland) Anderson	7	7	1
4	(England) Harlow	6	9	2
6	(Scotland) Foster	11	5
15	(England) Gillett	4	5

Final
4	(England) Harlow	10	1	0
6	(Scotland) Foster	7	11	2

=== Women's singles ===
First round
(England) Ellen Falkner	7	7
(Scotland) Claire Johnston	7	3
(England) Janice Gower	5	7	2
(England) Katy Smith	6	4	0
(Australia) Karen Murphy	9	5	1
(England) Amy Stanton	6	12	2
(England) Rebecca Field	4	4
(England) Katherine Rednall	6	6

Semi-finals
(England) Falkner	6	8
(England) Gower	5	7
(England) Stanton	3	4
(England) Rednall	8	8

Final
(England) Falkner	5	6
(England) Rednall	10	10

=== Open pairs ===
First round

Quarter-finals

Semi-finals

Final

(England) Mervyn King

(Scotland) David Gourlay

9
12

(Australia) David Holt

(Australia) Des Cann

6
3

(Scotland) Gourlay

(England) King

7
5

(Scotland) Darren Burnett

(Scotland) Stewart Anderson

(Scotland) Anderson

(Scotland) Burnett

3
4

bye

(Scotland) Gourlay

(England) King

8
3
1

(Scotland) Alex Marshall

(Scotland) Paul Foster

(England) Gillett

(Wales) Greenslade

4
7
2

bye

(Scotland) Marshall

(Scotland) Foster

5
10
1

(Wales) Jason Greenslade

(England) Les Gillett

8
5
2

(England) Gillett

(Wales) Greenslade

8
2
2

(England) Danny Brown

(England) Matthew Whyers

1
8
1

(England) Gillett

(Wales) Greenslade

7
8

(England) Robert Paxton

(Scotland) Jonathan Ross

(Wales) Doubler

(Wales) Salmon

7
6

bye

(England) Paxton

(Scotland) Ross

4
6

(England) Jamie Chestney

(England) Mark Dawes

7
6

(England) Chestney

(England) Dawes

5
8

(Scotland) Andrew Barker

(Scotland) Michael Stepney

6
4

(England) Chestney

(England) Dawes

7
9
1

(England) Andy Thomson

(England) Mark Royal

4
4

(Wales) Doubler

(Wales) Salmon

8
1
2

(Wales) Damian Doubler

(Wales) Daniel Salmon

6
9

(Wales) Doubler

(Wales) Salmon

5
8

bye

(England) Brett

(England) Harlow

3
2

(England) Nick Brett

(England) Greg Harlow

=== Mixed pairs ===
Quarter-finals

Semi-finals

Final

(Scotland) Darren Burnett

(England) Katherine Rednall

3
4

(Scotland) David Gourlay

(Australia) Karen Murphy

6
4

(Scotland) Gourlay
(Australia) Murphy
3
8
1

(Scotland) Foster
(England) Field
6
3
2

(Scotland) Paul Foster

(England) Rebecca Field

5
6

(England) Robert Paxton

(England) Ellen Falkner

5
3

(Scotland) Foster
(England) Field
6
9
1

(England) Brett
(Scotland) Johnston
7
7
2

(Scotland) Alex Marshall

(England) Katy Smith

4
4
1

(England) Nick Brett

(Scotland) Claire Johnston

9
3
2

(England) Brett
(Scotland) Johnston
6
8
2

(England) Harlow
(England) Stanton
7
6
0

(England) Andy Thomson

(England) Janice Gower

2
3

(England) Greg Harlow

(England) Amy Stanton

7
6

=== Open Under-25 Singles ===
Semi-finals
(Wales) Joseph Mower	4	5
(England) Martin Puckett	9	6
(Australia) Ellen Ryan	10	4	2
(Scotland) Jason Banks	1	7	1

Final
(England) Puckett	7	10	1
(Australia) Ryan	10	6	2
