= 2020 World Indoor Bowls Championship =

Bowls event

- 42nd World Indoor Bowls Championship
- Location: (England) Hopton-on-Sea, Great Yarmouth, Norfolk
- Date: 9–26 January 2020
- Category: World Indoor Championships

The 2020 Just World Indoor Bowls Championship was held at Potters Leisure Resort, Hopton-on-Sea, Great Yarmouth, England, from 9–26 January 2020. The event was organised by the World Bowls Tour and televised by the BBC.

In the Open Singles, all 16 seeds progressed to round two, which last happened in 2009 but the top four seeds failed to make the semi-final stage. Nick Brett progressed to the final and was attempting to become the first player in the history of the competition to achieve the treble of open singles, open pairs and mixed pairs during the same year. His opponent Robert Paxton (in his third career open singles final) started well in the first set before Brett took control of the set, winning it 10–7. Paxton deservedly took the second set 8-7 despite a late Brett comeback which forced the match into a tie break. The tie break went to the deciding end and Paxton's second bowl on the backhand was good enough to seal the title and deny Brett the treble.

In the Open Pairs, the third seeds Greg Harlow and Nick Brett won the title beating Paul Foster and Alex Marshall in the final which prevented the Scottish pair from winning another pairs event.

Julie Forrest successfully retained her women's crown by defeating Janice Gower in the final.

The mixed pairs saw Nick Brett win a second title and a fifth career world indoor success, he was partnered by Marion Purcell.

== Winners ==
Event	Winner
Open Singles	(England) Robert Paxton
Women's Singles	(Scotland) Julie Forrest
Open Pairs	(England) Greg Harlow & Nick Brett
Mixed Pairs	(England) Nick Brett & (Wales) Marion Purcell
Open Under-25	(England) William Moulton

== Draw and results ==
=== Open singles ===
First round
1	(Scotland) Stewart Anderson	8	10
(Wales) Daniel Salmon	5	4
16	(England) Simon Skelton	4	9	2
(Scotland) Colin Banks	7	5	0
9	(England) Jamie Chestney	10	9
(Scotland) Chris Carswell	4	3
8	(England) Robert Paxton	7	9
(South Africa) Craig Rimmington	5	7
5	(England) Les Gillett	12	8
(Northern Ireland) Scott Jess	2	4
12	(Scotland) Alex Marshall	10	11
(United States) Lawrence Quill	3	3
13	(Scotland) Michael Stepney	11	8
(Australia) Scott Walker	2	7
4	(Scotland) David Gourlay	8	8	2
(Scotland) John McCrorie	3	9	0
3	(Scotland) Paul Foster	6	10
(England) Lee Harris	6	3
14	(England) Mark Royal	9	9
(United States) Dan LeMessurier	7	3
11	(England) Mervyn King	12	7
(New Zealand) Craig Tinker	2	3
6	(England) Nick Brett	8	9
(England) Scott Edwards	3	4
7	(Scotland) Darren Burnett	6	7
(England) Kevin Harrison	6	4
10	(England) Mark Dawes	13	8
(New Zealand) Elliott Mason	4	6
15	(Wales) Jason Greenslade	8	10
(Australia) Brendan Egan	7	2
2	(England) Greg Harlow	12	11
(Australia) Blake Nairn	0	5

Second round
1	(Scotland) Anderson	11	12
16	(England) Skelton	1	3
9	(England) Chestney	6	4
8	(England) Paxton	7	7
5	(England) Gillett	8	11
12	(Scotland) Marshall	3	4
13	(Scotland) Stepney	0	5
4	(Scotland) Gourlay	15	7
3	(Scotland) Foster	7	5	0
14	(England) Royal	6	7	2
11	(England) King	5	7
6	(England) Brett	9	7
7	(Scotland) Burnett	5	5
10	(England) Dawes	11	6
15	(Wales) Greenslade	3	10	2
2	(England) Harlow	10	8	1

Quarter-finals
1	(Scotland) Anderson	7	3	0
8	(England) Paxton	4	10	2
5	(England) Gillett	9	9
4	(Scotland) Gourlay	2	6
14	(England) Royal	8	5	1
6	(England) Brett	7	6	2
10	(England) Dawes	8	8	0
15	(Wales) Greenslade	4	9	2

Semi-finals
8	(England) Paxton	8	10
5	(England) Gillett	5	1
6	(England) Brett	8	8
15	(Wales) Greenslade	7	5

Final
8	(England) Paxton	7	8	2
6	(England) Brett	10	7	1

=== Women's singles ===
First round
(Scotland) Julie Forrest	11	7
(Scotland) Lorna Cameron	4	2
(Guernsey) Alison Merrien	8	7	2
(England) Devon Cooper	4	10	0
(New Zealand) Rhonda Adams	7	2	1
(England) Janice Gower	6	13	2
(England) Nicole Rogers	10	7
(Wales) Marion Purcell	3	6

Semi-finals
(Scotland) Forrest	4	11	2
(Guernsey) Merrien	10	4	0
(England) Gower	8	7
(England) Rogers	4	3

Final
(Scotland) Forrest	8	15
(England) Gower	7	3

=== Open pairs ===
First round

Quarter-finals

Semi-finals

Final

1
(Scotland) Paul Foster
(Scotland) Alex Marshall

bye

1
(Scotland) Foster
(Scotland) Marshall
8
10

(England) Les Gillett
(Wales) Jason Greenslade
5
6
1

(England) Maynard
(England) Rippey
6
2

(England) Paul Maynard
(England) James Rippey
8
4
2

1
(Scotland) Foster

(Scotland) Marshall

5
10
2

4
(Scotland) David Gourlay
(England) Mervyn King

4
(Scotland) Gourlay

(England) King

6
2
1

bye

4
(Scotland) Gourlay

(England) King

8
3
2

(England) Mark Royal
(England) Robert Paxton
10
15

(England) Royal

(England) Paxton

3
9
1

(Scotland) Ronnie Duncan
(Scotland) Colin Walker
5
0

1
(Scotland) Foster

(Scotland) Marshall

6
8
1

3
(England) Greg Harlow
(England) Nick Brett

3
(England) Harlow

(England) Brett

10
6
2

bye

3
(England) Harlow

(England) Brett

8
10

(England) Jamie Chestney
(England) Mark Dawes
7
8

(England) Chestney

(England) Dawes

4
2

(Northern Ireland) Marty Trainor
(Northern Ireland) Andy Duncan
6
1

3
(England) Harlow

(England) Brett

6
6

2
(Scotland) Darren Burnett
(Scotland) Stewart Anderson

2
(Scotland) Anderson

(Scotland) Burnett

3
5

bye

2
(Scotland) Anderson

(Scotland) Burnett

8
7

(Wales) Damian Doubler
(Wales) Daniel Salmon
9
5
1

(Scotland) Stepney

(England) Skelton

4
4

(Scotland) Michael Stepney
(England) Simon Skelton
4
9
2

=== Mixed pairs ===
Quarter-finals

Semi-finals

Final

(England) Robert Paxton

(England) Ellen Falkner

6
6

(Scotland) David Gourlay

(England) Janice Gower

7
7

(Scotland) Gourlay
(England) Gower
8
0
0

(England) Harlow
(Guernsey) Merrien
1
9
2

(England) Greg Harlow

(Guernsey) Alison Merrien

8
5
2

(Scotland) Darren Burnett

(England) Nicole Rogers

7
6
0

(England) Harlow
(Guernsey) Merrien
6
7

(England) Brett
(Wales) Purcell
7
8

(England) Nick Brett

(Wales) Marion Purcell

7
3
2

(Scotland) Paul Foster

(Scotland) Julie Forrest

3
8
0

(England) Brett
(Wales) Purcell
7
5

(Scotland) Anderson
(Scotland) Cameron
3
4

(Scotland) Stewart Anderson

(Scotland) Lorna Cameron

7
8

(England) Les Gillett

(New Zealand) Rhonda Adams

6
3

=== Open Under 25 ===
Semi-finals
(New Zealand) Jesse Russell	4	8
(England) William Moulton	13	9
(Australia) Dale McWhinney	9	6	0
(Scotland) Keiran Clinton	11	5	2

Final
(England) Moulton	12	9
(Scotland) Clinton	10	9
