= 2018 World Indoor Bowls Championship =

Bowls championship held in Hopton-on-Sea, Great Yarmouth, Norfolk

- 40th World Indoor Bowls Championship
- Location: (England) Hopton-on-Sea, Great Yarmouth, Norfolk
- Date: 12–28 January 2018
- Category: World Indoor Championships

The 2018 Just World Indoor Bowls Championship took place at Potters Leisure Resort, Hopton-on-Sea, Great Yarmouth, England, on 12–28 January 2018.

Mark Dawes and Robert Paxton reached the Open singles final with Dawes taking the title on a tie break. Dawes had been the player of the tournament. Katherine Rednall won her third singles title defeating Rebecca Field in the final. The seventh seeds Mark Dawes and Jamie Chestney won the Open pairs final beating Nick Brett and Greg Harlow. Chestney missed the opportunity to win the first set with his last bowl but gained a three count to draw the set 6–6; the second set was won 9–5, helped by a decisive 5–0 count on end five. Chestney also won the Mixed Pairs title with Lesley Doig.

Northern Ireland's Chloe Watson received the Open Under-25 Singles title after her opponent, defending champion Ellen Ryan, was unable to complete the final as she felt unwell.

== Winners ==
Event	Winner
Open Singles	(England) Mark Dawes
Women's Singles	(England) Katherine Rednall
Open Pairs	(England) Mark Dawes & (England) Jamie Chestney
Mixed Pairs	(England) Jamie Chestney & (Scotland) Lesley Doig
Open Under-25 Singles	(Northern Ireland) Chloe Watson

== Draw and results ==
=== Open singles ===
First round
1	(Scotland) Paul Foster	2	12	2
(England) Lea Blackham	8	4	1
16	(Wales) Jason Greenslade	8	6
(Scotland) Robert Gordon	2	6
9	(Scotland) Darren Burnett	9	7
(Northern Ireland) Graham McKee	9	5
8	(England) Jamie Chestney	10	8	2
(England) Chris Gale	1	9	0
5	(Scotland) David Gourlay	8	10
(Scotland) John McCrorie	3	2
12	(England) Mark Dawes	12	12
(Hong Kong) Cy Wong	4	1
13	(England) Mark Royal	12	10
(Australia) Scott Walker	4	5
4	(Scotland) Alex Marshall	5	2
(New Zealand) Andrew Kelly	6	11
3	(England) Nick Brett	10	9
(South Africa) George Lotter	5	7
14	(England) Mervyn King	8	11
(England) Ian McIntosh	3	4
11	(England) Les Gillett	11	8
(England) Simon Skelton	3	7
6	(England) Robert Paxton	9	6	2
(Wales) Daniel Salmon	5	7	1
7	(Scotland) Stewart Anderson	2	9	2
(England) Perry Martin	10	5	1
10	(England) Andy Thomson	3	12	1
(England) Wayne Willgress	9	3	2
15	(Scotland) Jonathan Ross	7	6
(England) Scott Edwards	7	9
2	(England) Greg Harlow	6	9	2
(England) Martin Puckett	7	4	1

Second round
1	(Scotland) Foster	7	4
16	(Wales) Greenslade	8	8
9	(Scotland) Burnett	7	8
8	(England) Chestney	5	4
5	(Scotland) Gourlay	6	6	1
12	(England) Dawes	7	5	2
13	(England) Royal	10	8
(New Zealand) Kelly	4	6
3	(England) Brett	2	6
14	(England) King	8	6
11	(England) Gillett	8	5
6	(England) Paxton	8	9
7	(Scotland) Anderson	9	6
(England) Willgress	9	13
(England) Edwards	6	3
2	(England) Harlow	9	9

Quarter-finals
16	(Wales) Greenslade	10	7	1
9	(Scotland) Burnett	11	6	2
12	(England) Dawes	8	9
13	(England) Royal	7	3
14	(England) King	5	4
6	(England) Paxton	5	6
(England) Willgress	2	10	2
2	(England) Harlow	11	9	0

Semi-finals
9	(Scotland) Burnett	7	5
12	(England) Dawes	8	10
6	(England) Paxton	6	11
(England) Willgress	3	4

Final
12	(England) Dawes	8	6	2
6	(England) Paxton	7	7	0

=== Women's singles ===
First round
(England) Katherine Rednall	10	8
(Scotland) Julie Forrest	5	4
(Australia) Ellen Ryan	8	5	0
(Scotland) Lesley Doig	7	8	2
(England) Janice Gower	6	8
(Guernsey) Alison Merrien	6	5
(England) Rebecca Field	6	9
(Northern Ireland) Chloe Watson	5	7

Semi-finals
(England) Rednall	10	13
(Scotland) Doig	4	2
(England) Gower	4	8	0
(England) Field	11	7	2

Final
(England) Rednall	13	13
(England) Field	6	6

=== Open pairs ===
First round

Quarter-finals

Semi-finals

Final

1
(Wales) Jason Greenslade

(England) Les Gillett

bye

1
(Wales) Greenslade

(England) Gillett

2
4

5
(England) Robert Paxton

(Scotland) Jonathan Ross

8
8

5
(England) Paxton

(Scotland) Ross

10
4

(Australia) Trentan Healey

(Australia) Scott Walker

5
8

5
(England) Paxton

(Scotland) Ross

10
4
0

3
(Scotland) Alex Marshall

(Scotland) Paul Foster

7
(England) Chestney

(England) Dawes

2
6
2

bye

3
(Scotland) Marshall

(United States) Neil Furman+

1
5

7
(England) Jamie Chestney

(England) Mark Dawes

12
4
2

7
(England) Chestney

(England) Dawes

8
7

(Wales) Brian Jones

(Wales) Liam Stone

4
7
1

7
(England) Chestney

(England) Dawes

6
9

4
(England) Mervyn King

(Scotland) David Gourlay

2
(England) Harlow

(England) Brett

6
5

bye

4
(Scotland) Gourlay

(England) King

3
3

8
(England) Andy Thomson

(England) Mark Royal

8
5

8
(England) Thomson

(England) Royal

4
8

(England) Kevin Harrison

(England) Stuart Irwin

4
5

8
(England) Thomson

(England) Royal

4
5
0

2
(England) Nick Brett

(England) Greg Harlow

2
(England) Harlow

(England) Brett

6
4
2

bye

2
(England) Harlow

(England) Brett

3
11
2

6
(Scotland) Darren Burnett

(Scotland) Stewart Anderson

4
10
2

6
(Scotland) Burnett

(Scotland) Anderson

6
4
0

(Scotland) Ronnie Duncan

(Scotland) Colin Walker

5
7
1

+ Furman replaced Paul Foster who withdrew following a family bereavement

=== Mixed pairs ===
Quarter-finals

Semi-finals

Final

(England) Greg Harlow

(England) Katherine Rednall

7
5

(Scotland) Alex Marshall

(Scotland) Julie Forrest

5
3

(England) Harlow
(England) Rednall
5
5

(England) Chestney
(Scotland) Doig
6
5

(Scotland) David Gourlay

(England) Janice Gower

3
5

(England) Jamie Chestney

(Scotland) Lesley Doig

11
5

(England) Chestney
(Scotland) Doig
8
7

(Scotland) Burnett
(England) Field
4
6

(Scotland) Darren Burnett+

(England) Rebecca Field

2
7
2

(England) Nick Brett

(Scotland) Claire Johnston

9
3
1

(Scotland) Burnett
(England) Field
7
4
2

(Scotland) Anderson
(Guernsey) Merrien
5
8
1

(England) Robert Paxton

(Australia) Ellen Ryan

6
4

(Scotland) Stewart Anderson

(Guernsey) Alison Merrien

6
6

+ Burnett replaced Paul Foster who withdrew following a family bereavement

=== Open Under-25 Singles ===
Semi-finals
(Australia) Ellen Ryan	9	8
(England) Connor Cinato	8	7
(Northern Ireland) Chloe Watson	9	7	2
(Scotland) Chris Carswell	6	8	0

Final
(Australia) Ryan+	1	0
(Northern Ireland) Watson	15	0

+ Ellen Ryan defaulted after completing the first set in the final as she was unwell and unable to continue
