= 2021 World Indoor Bowls Championship =

Bowls championship held in Hopton-on-Sea, Great Yarmouth, Norfolk

- 43rd World Indoor Bowls Championship
- Location: (England) Hopton-on-Sea, Great Yarmouth, Norfolk
- Date: 8–24 January 2021
- Category: World Indoor Championships

The 2021 Just World Indoor Bowls Championship took place at Potters Leisure Resort, Hopton-on-Sea, Great Yarmouth, England, from 8–24 January 2021. The event was organised by the World Bowls Tour, televised by the BBC and streamed live on YouTube. The event was played behind closed doors and there was no under-25 competition due to the COVID-19 pandemic. As a consequence of the pandemic there were no overseas players involved.

A fairer system was devised in the Open pairs whereby all competitors would face a first round match and there would be no byes.

Late changes had to be made to the draw, with world number one and 2nd seed Nick Brett unable to participate because he broke his arm following an accident playing golf. Scottish 11th seed Darren Burnett also pulled out through injury, while Colin Walker, Ian Honnor and Caroline Brown withdrew for personal reasons. Brown was replaced by Rebecca Willgress. This also meant Darren Weir, Julie Forrest, Katherine Rednall and Ellen Falkner were added to the Open Singles field, with Weir, Rednall, Falkner and Devon Cooper being added into the Open Pairs.

In the Men's Singles, the quarter-final match between Perry Martin and Wayne Willgress was declared void following a positive COVID-19 test for both players. As a result Mark Dawes (who was due to play the winner in the semi-finals) received a walkover into the final. The other finalist was Greg Harlow who was a comfortable winner over David Gourlay in the only semi final. In the final Dawes controlled the match and won 10-3 11-5 to claim his second singles title.

In the Women's Singles, Laura Daniels claimed her second title success by beating Katherine Rednall in a repeat of the 2015 final in which the Welshwoman also won. Rednall, seven months pregnant, had to compete just minutes after beating Alex Marshall in the second round of the Open Singles. Earlier in the competition, Ellen Falkner had to withdraw from her first round match with Rednall due to a shoulder injury. Defending champion Julie Forrest went out in the first round, beaten by Devon Cooper.

In the Open Pairs, Ellen Falkner partnered by Greg Harlow (the defending champion) became the first woman in the competition's history to reach an open final where they met 2018 champions Mark Dawes & Jamie Chestney. Harlow and Falkner won a tight first set 7-6 with Harlow consistently drawing to win an end. Dawes playing a strong lead helped secure a comfortable second set 9-2, sending the match into a tie break. Dawes and Chestney won the tie break 2-1.

In the Mixed Pairs final Stewart Anderson and Julie Forrest defeated Robert Paxton and Carla Banks.

== Winners ==
Event	Winner
Open Singles	(England) Mark Dawes
Women's Singles	(Wales) Laura Daniels
Open Pairs	(England) Mark Dawes & (England) Jamie Chestney
Mixed Pairs	(Scotland) Stewart Anderson & (Scotland) Julie Forrest

== Draw and results ==
=== Open Singles ===
First round
1	(England) Robert Paxton	7	1+
(England) Jack Bird	8	5
16	(England) Simon Skelton	6	10
(Scotland) Connor Milne	6	3
9	(England) Mervyn King	6	9
(England) Ellen Falkner	4	5
8	(England) Mark Dawes	7	9
(Scotland) Darren Weir	7	7
5	(England) Les Gillett	9	1	1
(England) Perry Martin	8	10	2
12	(England) Mark Royal	7	6
(Wales) Damian Doubler	4	5
13	(Scotland) Michael Stepney	7	8	1
(England) Wayne Willgress	8	2	2
4	(Scotland) Paul Foster	12	11
(Northern Ireland) Sam Barkley	2	7
3	(Scotland) Stewart Anderson	10	8	2
(England) Andrew Walters	4	9	0
14	(England) Jamie Chestney	6	6
(Wales) Daniel Salmon	6	10
(Scotland) Julie Forrest	3	8	2
(Scotland) Jason Banks	11	7	0
6	(England) Greg Harlow	6	2	2
(England) Andy Thomson	3	8	1
7	(Scotland) David Gourlay	7	8
(England) Scott Edwards	4	6
10	(Wales) Jason Greenslade	10	7
(Northern Ireland) Stuart Bennett	2	6
15	(Scotland) Alex Marshall	12	9
(Scotland) James Rippey	7	5
(England) Katherine Rednall	6	7	2
(England) Stuart Irwin	9	6	0

Second round
(England) Bird	5	3
16	(England) Skelton	8	8
9	(England) King	7	3	1
8	(England) Dawes	6	12	2
(England) Martin	10	6
12	(England) Royal	7	2
(England) Willgress	7	5
4	(Scotland) Foster	6	4
3	(Scotland) Anderson	4	9	2
(Wales) Salmon	9	2	1
(Scotland) Forrest	8	6
6	(England) Harlow	8	7
7	(Scotland) Gourlay	8	7
10	(Wales) Greenslade	8	5
15	(Scotland) Marshall	5	5
(England) Rednall	7	5

Quarter-finals
16	(England) Skelton	4	5
8	(England) Dawes	7	7
(England) Martin	w/d
(England) Willgress	w/d
3	(Scotland) Anderson	8	3	1
6	(England) Harlow	6	8	2
7	(Scotland) Gourlay	5	7	2
(England) Rednall	9	4	0

Semi-finals
8	(England) Dawes	w/o
6	(England) Harlow	9	7
7	(Scotland) Gourlay	5	3

Final
8	(England) Dawes	10	11
6	(England) Harlow	3	5

+ Paxton conceded

=== Women's singles ===
First round
(Scotland) Julie Forrest	7	4	0
(England) Devon Cooper	3	10	2
(England) Katherine Rednall	w/o
(England) Ellen Falkner	w/d
(Wales) Marion Purcell	5	8
(England) Rebecca Willgress	10	10
(Wales) Laura Daniels	7	7	2
(Scotland) Carla Banks	8	6	1

Semi-finals
(England) Cooper	2	4
(England) Rednall	9	8
(England) Willgress	4	8	0
(Wales) Daniels	8	5	2

Final
(England) Rednall	14	4	0
(Wales) Daniels	2	11	2

=== Open Pairs ===
First round
(England) Greg Harlow (England) Ellen Falkner	8	7
(Wales) Daniel Salmon (Wales) Damian Doubler	3	6
(England) Les Gillett (Wales) Jason Greenslade	7	8	0
(England) Perry Martin (England) Wayne Willgress	8	7	2
(Scotland) Michael Stepney (England) Simon Skelton	6	8	2
(England) Andrew Walters (England) Scott Edwards	7	7	0
(Scotland) Paul Foster (Scotland) Alex Marshall	9	10
(Scotland) Darren Weir (Scotland) James Rippey	2	1
(England) Mark Royal (England) Robert Paxton	6	11
(England) Andy Thomson (England) Devon Cooper	5	3
(England) Jamie Chestney (England) Mark Dawes	8	9
(Scotland) Jason Banks (Scotland) Connor Milne	5	4
(Scotland) David Gourlay (England) Mervyn King	9	8
(Northern Ireland) Stuart Bennett (Northern Ireland) Sam Barkley	5	7
(England) Katherine Rednall (Scotland) Stewart Anderson	8	4	1
(England) Jack Bird (England) Stuart Irwin	5	6	2

Quarter-finals
(England) Harlow (England) Falkner	4	8	2
(England) Martin (England) Willgress	10	5	1
(Scotland) Stepney (England) Skelton	7	5	2
(Scotland) Foster (Scotland) Marshall	6	8	1
(England) Royal (England) Paxton	4	9	0
(England) Chestney (England) Dawes	9	7	2
(Scotland) Gourlay (England) King	5	3
(England) Bird (England) Irwin	6	10

Semi-finals
(England) Harlow (England) Falkner	4	8	2
(Scotland) Stepney (England) Skelton	9	3	0
(England) Chestney (England) Dawes	9	9
(England) Bird (England) Irwin	6	1

Final
(England) Harlow (England) Falkner	7	2	1
(England) Chestney (England) Dawes	6	9	2

=== Mixed pairs ===
First Round
(England) Mervyn King (Wales) Marion Purcell	6	5
(England) Robert Paxton (Scotland) Carla Banks	7	9
(Scotland) David Gourlay (England) Katherine Rednall	9	5	2
(England) Greg Harlow (England) Rebecca Willgress	9	5	1
(England) Mark Dawes (England) Ellen Falkner	6	4
(Scotland) Stewart Anderson (Scotland) Julie Forrest	8	9
(Scotland) Paul Foster (Wales) Laura Daniels	2	4
(England) Les Gillett (England) Devon Cooper	10	7

Semi-finals
(England) Paxton (Scotland) Banks	6	9
(Scotland) Gourlay (England) Rednall	6	4
(Scotland) Anderson (Scotland) Forrest	12	11
(England) Gillett (England) Cooper	1	3

Final
(England) Paxton (Scotland) Banks	3	5
(Scotland) Anderson (Scotland) Forrest	8	6
