= 2016 World Indoor Bowls Championship =

Bowls championship held in Great Yarmouth, Norfolk

World Indoor Championships 2016
- 38th World Indoor Bowls Championships
- Location: (England) Great Yarmouth, Norfolk
- Date: 08-24 January 2016.
- Category: World Indoor Championships

The 2016 Just Retirement World Indoor Bowls Championship was held at Potters Leisure Resort, Hopton on Sea, Great Yarmouth, England, from 08-24 January 2016.
Nick Brett won the blue riband event (the Men's Singles) for the first time after beating Robert Paxton in a competitive final. In the Open Pairs Stewart Anderson and Darren Burnett recorded their first title success. Burnett doubled up by winning the Mixed Pairs title with Katherine Rednall. Ellen Falkner won the Women's Singles defeating Rebecca Field in the final. This was Falkner's third title and was achieved ten years after her last success.

Wales' Joseph Mower won the inaugural U25 singles event, beating countryman Ross Owen in a tie-break.

== Winners ==
Event	Winner
Men's Singles	(England) Nick Brett
Women's Singles	(England) Ellen Falkner
Open Pairs	(Scotland) Stewart Anderson & (Scotland) Darren Burnett
Mixed Pairs	(Scotland) Darren Burnett & (England) Katherine Rednall
Open Under-25 Singles	(Wales) Joseph Mower

== Draw and results ==
=== Men's singles ===
First round
1	(Scotland) Alex Marshall	9	7
(Northern Ireland) Gary Kelly	5	5
16	(England) Mark Dawes	9	10
(Australia) Jamie Smith	2	2
8	(England) Mervyn King	7	7
(Wales) Steve Harris	6	7
9	(Scotland) Stewart Anderson	12	8
(New Zealand) Rob Ashton	1	3
4	(England) Robert Paxton	9	8
(England) Robert Chisholm	3	4
13	(England) Mark Royal	8	10
(United States) Neil Furman	3	2
5	(England) Andy Thomson	5	9	1
(England) Connor Cinato	8	6	2
12	(Wales) Jason Greenslade	8	3	1
(England) Jamie Chestney	7	8	2
3	(Scotland) Paul Foster	9	3	1
(England) Matthew Orrey	1	9	2
14	(Wales) John Price	10	4	1
(England) Simon Skelton	5	9	2
6	(Scotland) David Gourlay	7	10
(England) Gary R Smith	6	6
11	(Scotland) Jonathan Ross	3	10	2
(Scotland) Ryan Clark	8	3	0
2	(England) Nick Brett	12	8
(England) James Rippey	3	4
15	(England) Les Gillett	10	4	2
(England) Jason Parkinson	5	7	1
7	(Scotland) Darren Burnett	8	7
(Scotland) Colin Walker	7	2
10	(England) Greg Harlow	9	7
(Scotland) Ronnie Duncan	4	7

Second round
1	(Scotland) Marshall	7	7	2
16	(England) Dawes	7	7	1
8	(England) King	2	8	1
9	(Scotland) Anderson	11	3	2
4	(England) Paxton	6	12	2
13	(England) Royal	7	5	0
(England) Cinato	3	3
(England) Chestney	10	8
(England) Orrey	7	7	2
(England) Skelton	10	6	1
6	(Scotland) Gourlay	7	9
11	(Scotland) Ross	2	4
2	(England) Brett	9	8
15	(England) Gillett	4	5
7	(Scotland) Burnett	4	6
10	(England) Harlow	9	6

Quarter-finals
1	(Scotland) Marshall	10	9
9	(Scotland) Anderson	2	2
4	(England) Paxton	7	7
(England) Chestney	3	7
(England) Orrey	3	4
6	(Scotland) Gourlay	9	5
2	(England) Brett	9	7
10	(England) Harlow	3	7

Semi-finals
1	(Scotland) Marshall	12	4	1
4	(England) Paxton	3	7	2
6	(Scotland) Gourlay	7	6	0
2	(England) Brett	6	7	2

Final
4	(England) Paxton	9	9
2	(England) Brett	9	12

=== Women's singles ===
First round
(Wales) Laura Thomas	13	12
(England) Janice Gower	2	3
(England) Ellen Falkner	4	8	2
(Scotland) Julie Forrest	9	6	1
(England) Rebecca Field	11	7
(Guernsey) Alison Merrien	9	7
(Northern Ireland) Cliodhna Eadie	6	2	2
(England) Katherine Rednall	5	8	0

Semi-finals
(Wales) Thomas	5	9	1
(England) Falkner	6	5	2
(England) Field	3	7	2
(Northern Ireland) Eadie	8	6	1

Final
(England) Falkner	10	8
(England) Field	9	7

=== Open Pairs ===
First round

Quarter-finals

Semi-finals

Final

(Scotland) Stewart Anderson

(Scotland) Darren Burnett

7
8

(England) Louis Ridout

(England) Sam Tolchard

5
6

(Scotland) Anderson

(Scotland) Burnett

12
6
2

(England) Nick Brett

(England) Greg Harlow

(England) Brett

(England) Harlow

7
10
1

bye

(Scotland) Anderson

(Scotland) Burnett

9
9

(England) Mark Royal

(England) Andy Thomson

(England) Royal

(England) Thomson

4
5

bye

(England) Royal

(England) Thomson

6
8

(Wales) Jason Greenslade

(Wales) John Price

6
11

(Wales) Price

(Wales) Greenslade

5
4

(Wales) Mark Harding

(Wales) Philip Rowland

5
2

(Scotland) Anderson

(Scotland) Burnett

10
10

(Scotland) Ronnie Duncan

(Scotland) Colin Walker

9
12

(Scotland) Duncan

(Scotland) Walker

7
6

(England) Mervyn King

(Scotland) David Gourlay

6
4

(Scotland) Duncan

(Scotland) Walker

10
4
2

(England) Simon Skelton

(England) Robert Paxton

(England) Skelton

(England) Paxton

7
9
0

bye

(Scotland) Duncan

(Scotland) Walker

3
9
2

(Scotland) Paul Foster

(Scotland) Alex Marshall

(Scotland) Foster

(Scotland) Marshall

9
4
1

bye

(Scotland) Foster

(Scotland) Marshall

8
10

(Northern Ireland) Chris Eadie

(Northern Ireland) David Corkill

9
9

(Northern Ireland) Eadie

(Northern Ireland) Corkill

7
3

(Scotland) Jonathan Ross

(England) Les Gillett

9
8

=== Mixed Pairs ===
Quarter-finals

Semi-finals

Final

(England) Nick Brett

(Guernsey) Alison Merrien

6
7
2

(England) Robert Paxton

(Wales) Marion Purcell

6
7
1

(England) Brett
(Guernsey) Merrien
3
6

(Scotland) Marshall
(Scotland) Forrest
9
7

(Scotland) Alex Marshall

(Scotland) Julie Forrest

8
7

(England) Andy Thomson

(Northern Ireland) Cliodhna Eadie

7
7

(Scotland) Marshall
(Scotland) Forrest
5
9

(Scotland) Burnett
(England) Rednall
11
14

(Scotland) Darren Burnett

(England) Katherine Rednall

11
10

(Scotland) David Gourlay

(England) Janice Gower

8
3

(Scotland) Burnett
(England) Rednall
7
10

(Scotland) Foster
(England) Field
4
2

(Scotland) Paul Foster

(England) Rebecca Field

7
8

(England) Mervyn King

(Wales) Laura Thomas

5
3

=== Open Under 25 Singles ===
Semi-finals
(Wales) Joseph Mower	15	6
(England) Jake Willgress	0	4
(England) Tom Smith	6	4
(Wales) Ross Owen	9	8

Final
(Wales) Mower	9	5	2
(Wales) Owen	4	11	1
