= 2015 World Indoor Bowls Championship =

Bowls championship held in Great Yarmouth, Norfolk

World Indoor Championships 2015
- 37th World Indoor Bowls Championships
- Location: (England) Great Yarmouth, Norfolk
- Date: 09-25 January 2015.
- Category: World Indoor Championships

The 2015 Just Retirement World Indoor Bowls Championship was held at Potters Leisure Resort, Hopton on Sea, Great Yarmouth, England, from 09-25 January 2015. The men's singles title was won for a record-extending sixth time by Scotland's Alex Marshall, who beat Andy Thomson in the final.
Robert Paxton & Simon Skelton won their first Pairs title, stopping Alex Marshall & Paul Foster from winning a fourth title.
Robert Paxton & Marion Purcell won their first Mixed Pairs title, stopping Paul Foster & Laura Thomas from winning a third consecutive title.
Laura Thomas won her first title, defeating defending champion Katherine Rednall in the final.

== Winners ==
Event	Winner
Men's Singles	(Scotland) Alex Marshall
Women's Singles	(Wales) Laura Thomas
Open Pairs	(England) Robert Paxton & (England) Simon Skelton
Mixed Pairs	(England) Robert Paxton & (Wales) Marion Purcell

== Draw and results ==
=== Men's singles ===
First round
1	(Scotland) Darren Burnett	7	8
(Scotland) Andrew Barker	5	6
16	(Scotland) Wayne Hogg	13	4	1
(Scotland) Graeme Donaldson	0	7	2
8	(Scotland) Stewart Anderson	6	12	2
(Scotland) Colin Walker	9	5	1
9	(England) Greg Harlow	5	9	2
(England) Martin Puckett	7	5	1
4	(England) Nick Brett	12	11
(New Zealand) Andy McLean	5	7
13	(Scotland) Jonathan Ross	8	11
(England) Billy Jackson	5	5
5	(Scotland) Alex Marshall	10	5	2
(Wales) Liam Bouse	5	8	0
12	(Wales) Jason Greenslade	5	3
(Australia) Ben Twist	9	8
3	(England) Robert Paxton	5	11	2
(England) Craig Newton	7	2	1
14	(England) Mark Royal	4	10	2
(Northern Ireland) Mark McPeak	9	4	1
6	(Scotland) David Gourlay	4	7	2
(Wales) Robert Weale	5	6	0
11	(Wales) John Price	9	2	2
(England) David Bolt	4	8	0
2	(Scotland) Paul Foster	9	12
(England) Mark Dawes	7	3
15	(England) Simon Skelton	6	8	0
(England) Tony Webb	11	2	2
7	(England) Mervyn King	10	9
(England) Ben Sherwen	1	6
10	(England) Andy Thomson	7	7	2
(Wales) Damian Doubler	6	8	0

Second round
1	(Scotland) Burnett	7	6	2
(Scotland) Donaldson	6	7	0
8	(Scotland) Anderson	6	6
9	(England) Harlow	6	9
4	(England) Brett	11	6
13	(Scotland) Ross	5	5
5	(Scotland) Marshall	9	13
(Australia) Twist	3	4
3	(England) Paxton	6	6
14	(England) Royal	4	6
6	(Scotland) Gourlay	10	8
11	(Wales) Price	4	5
2	(Scotland) Foster	9	7
(England) Webb	2	5
7	(England) King	11	6	1
10	(England) Thomson	7	8	2

Quarter-finals
1	(Scotland) Burnett	1	1
9	(England) Harlow	11	11
4	(England) Brett	4	14	1
5	(Scotland) Marshall	11	4	2
3	(England) Paxton	6	6
6	(Scotland) Gourlay	12	6
2	(Scotland) Foster	6	4
10	(England) Thomson	7	7

Semi-finals
9	(England) Harlow	6	5
5	(Scotland) Marshall	7	7
6	(Scotland) Gourlay	6	8	0
10	(England) Thomson	7	3	2

Final
5	(Scotland) Marshall	11	10
10	(England) Thomson	9	3

=== Women's singles ===
First round
(England) Victoria Bilson	11	10
(Canada) Laura Hawryszko	5	3
(England) Katherine Rednall	8	10
(Wales) Marion Purcell	6	5
(Scotland) Julie Forrest	7	8	1
(England) Amy Stanton	8	3	2
(England) Rebecca Field	6	6
(Wales) Laura Thomas	9	7

Semi-finals
(England) Bilson	5	4
(England) Rednall	10	8
(England) Stanton	2	7	0
(Wales) Thomas	12	6	2

Final
(England) Rednall	5	9
(Wales) Thomas	14	10

=== Men's Pairs ===
First round

Quarter-finals

Semi-finals

Final

(England) Greg Harlow

(England) Nick Brett

bye

(England) Harlow

(England) Brett

11
10

(Scotland) Darren Burnett

(Scotland) Stewart Anderson

7
7
2

(Scotland) Burnett

(Scotland) Anderson

2
8

(Wales) Robert Chisholm

(Wales) Ross Owen

8
6
0

(England) Harlow

(England) Brett

5
4

(England) Robert Paxton

(England) Simon Skelton

(England) Paxton

(England) Skelton

10
12

bye

(England) Paxton

(England) Skelton

7
8

(Wales) John Price

(Wales) Jason Greenslade

7
7

(England) Jackson

(England) Smith

4
5

(England) Billy Jackson

(England) Gary R Smith

8
7

(England) Paxton

(England) Skelton

5
15
2

(Scotland) David Gourlay

(England) Mervyn King

(Scotland) Marshall

(Scotland) Foster

12
5
1

bye

(Scotland) Gourlay

(England) King

5
7

(Scotland) Jonathan Ross

(Scotland) Wayne Hogg

5
10
2

(Scotland) Ross

(Scotland) Hogg

7
7

(Australia) Barrie Lester

(Australia) Josh Thornton

8
3
1

(Scotland) Ross

(Scotland) Hogg

7
6

(Scotland) Paul Foster

(Scotland) Alex Marshall

(Scotland) Marshall

(Scotland) Foster

7
8

bye

(Scotland) Marshall

(Scotland) Foster

5
13
2

(England) Andy Thomson

(England) Mark Royal

3
3

(Scotland) Duncan

(Scotland) Walker

9
6
1

(Scotland) Ronnie Duncan

(Scotland) Colin Walker

7
7

=== Mixed Pairs ===
Quarter-finals
(Scotland) Darren Burnett (Canada) Laura Hawryszko	1	8
(Scotland) Paul Foster (Wales) Laura Thomas	11	8
(England) Nick Brett (England) Rebecca Field	10	2	1
(Scotland) Stewart Anderson (England) Amy Stanton	5	10	2
(England) Robert Paxton (Wales) Marion Purcell	10	7
(Scotland) David Gourlay (England) Victoria Bilson	3	5
(Scotland) Alex Marshall (Scotland) Julie Forrest	8	9
(England) Mervyn King (England) Katherine Rednall	6	5

Semi-finals
(Scotland) Foster (Wales) Thomas	9	7
(Scotland) Anderson (England) Stanton	4	4
(England) Paxton (Wales) Purcell	8	6
(Scotland) Marshall (Scotland) Forrest	7	6

Final
(Scotland) Foster (Wales) Thomas	10	7	1
(England) Paxton (Wales) Purcell	8	9	2
