= 2023 World Bowls Indoor Championships =

Indoor Bowls Championship

- 2nd
- Location: (Australia) Warilla Bowls & Recreation Club; Barrack Heights, New South Wales
- Date: 7–12 May 2023

The 2023 World Bowls Indoor Championships took place at the Warilla Bowls & Recreation Club in Barrack Heights, New South Wales, Australia from 7 to 12 May 2023. The event was organised by World Bowls and the International Indoor Bowls Council (IIBC).

The format of the Championships is one player representing each county in the singles and two in the pairs. A round robin will end with the top two in the singles progressing to the knock out rounds but only the group winner in the pairs progressing to the knock out round.

== Winners ==
Event	Winner
Men's singles	(Australia) Aron Sherriff
Women's singles	(Scotland) Julie Forrest
Mixed pairs	(Australia) Aron Sherriff & (Australia) Kelsey Cottrell

== Results ==
=== Men's singles ===
First round

Section 1
Pos	Name	W	D	L	Pts
1	(Australia) Aron Sherriff	4	4	0	8
2	(Cook Islands) Royden Aperau	4	2	2	4 (+6)
3	(Namibia) Carel Olivier	4	2	2	4 (-8)
4	(Philippines) Christopher Dagpin	4	2	2	4 (-10)
5	(United States) Scottie Marzonie	4	0	4	0

Section 2
Pos	Name	W	D	L	Pts
1	(Scotland) Michael Stepney	5	5	0	10
2	(South Africa) Wayne Rittmuller	5	4	1	8
3	(Fiji) Zainal Mohammed	5	2	3	4
4	(Hong Kong) Eric Lam	5	2	3	4
5	(Sweden) Pontus Palmkvist	5	1	4	2
6	(Turkey) Ozkan Akar	5	1	4	2

Section 3
Pos	Name	W	D	L	Pts
1	(Malaysia) Izzat Dzulkeple	5	5	0	10
2	John Nicoll	5	4	1	8
3	(Switzerland) Markus Merz	5	3	2	6
4	(Tonga) Chris Smith	5	1	4	2
5	(Botswana) Pako Sephetsolo	5	1	4	2
6	(Macau) Johnny Ng	1	4	0	2

Section 4
Pos	Name	W	D	L	Pts
1	(New Zealand) Andrew Kelly	5	5	0	10
2	(England) Martin Puckett	5	3	2	6
3	(Thailand) Wattana Kadkhunthod	5	3	2	6
4	(Canada) Jerome Kirby	5	2	3	0
5	(Hungary) Zoltan Pavelka	5	1	4	2
6	(Sri Lanka) Susil Ramanayake	5	0	5	0

Section 5
Pos	Name	W	D	L	Pts
1	(Scotland) Connor Milne	5	5	0	10
2	(Jersey) Malcolm De Sousa	5	4	1	8
3	(Malta) Troy Lorimer	5	2	3	4
4	(Singapore) Anthony Loh	5	2	3	4
5	(Kenya) Benson Wambugu	5	2	3	4
6	(Jamaica) Martin Edwards	5	0	5	0

Section 6
Pos	Name	W	D	L	Pts
1	(Wales) Daniel Salmon	5	4	1	8
2	(Guernsey) Ian Merrien	5	4	1	8
3	(Netherlands) Frank De Vries	5	3	2	6
4	Cecil Alexander	5	2	3	4
5	(Norfolk Island) Phil Jones	5	2	3	4
6	(Japan) Masahiro Kawamoto	5	0	5	0

Second round

Player 1	Player 2	Score
Sheriff	De Sousa	7–5, 6–4
Salmon	Aperau	10–1, 6–6
Milne	Kadkhunthod	5–4, 5–5
Puckett	Nicoll	10–1, 8–3
Kelly	Olivier	7–6, 6–4
Dzulkeple	De Fries	10–0, 6–2
Stepney	Merz	7–6, 9–4
Merrien	Rittmuller	8–1, 6–6

Quarter finals

Player 1	Player 2	Score
Puckett	Milne	4–4, 5–5, 1–0
Sherriff	Salmon	4–7, 8–2, 1–0
Kelly	Dzulkeple	9–3, 3–8, 1–0
Stepney	Merrien	7–3, 7–4

Semi finals

Player 1	Player 2	Score
Sherriff	Puckett	8–5, 4–5, 1–0
Kelly	Stepney	1–8, 8–4, 3–0

Final

Player 1	Player 2	Score
Sherriff	Kelly	10–8, 5–8, 1–0

=== Women's singles ===
First round

Section 1
Pos	Name	W	D	L	Pts
1	(Malaysia) Alyani Jamil	4	4	0	8
2	(Guernsey) Alison Merrien MBE	4	2	2	6
3	(United States) Dee McSparran	4	2	2	4
4	(Cook Islands) Teokotai Rahui	4	1	3	2
5	(Singapore) Li Li Leng	4	0	4	0

Section 2
Pos	Name	W	D	L	Pts
1	(New Zealand) Katelyn Inch	4	4	0	8
2	Lesley Mills	4	3	1	6
3	(Canada) Linda Ng	4	2	2	4
4	(Israel) Amalia Levy	4	1	3	2
5	(Kenya) Ester Ndungu	4	0	4	0

Section 3
Pos	Name	W	D	L	Pts
1	(England) Kirsty Hembrow	4	4	0	8
2	(Thailand) Palita Gangur	4	2	2	4
3	(Philippines) Marisa Baronda	4	2	2	4
4	(Netherlands) Ineke Spangenberg	4	1	3	2
5	(Namibia) Petronella Nreedt	4	1	3	2

Section 4
Pos	Name	W	D	L	Pts
1	(Scotland) Julie Forrest	4	4	0	8
2	(Malta) Connie-Leigh Rixon	4	3	1	6
3	(Japan) Yoko Goda	4	2	2	4
4	(Jersey) Megan Kivlin	4	1	3	2
5	(Botswana) Lebogang Makhupe	4	0	4	0

Section 5
Pos	Name	W	D	L	Pts
1	(South Africa) Colleen Piketh	4	3	1	6
2	(Australia) Kelsey Cottrell	4	2	2	4 (+22)
3	(Tonga) Milika Nathan	4	2	2	4 (-8)
4	(China) Pian Lai	4	2	2	4 (-28)
5	(Norfolk Island) Shae Wilson	4	1	3	2

Section 6
Pos	Name	W	D	L	Pts
1	(Hong Kong) Dorothy Yu	5	4	1	8
2	(Wales) Amy Williams	5	4	1	8
3	(Scotland) Lorraine Craig	5	4	1	8
4	(Switzerland) Marianne Kuenzie	5	2	3	4
5	(Sri Lanka) Kumari Mangos	5	1	3	2
6	(Turkey) Pinar Kapusuz	5	0	5	0

Second round

Player 1	Player 2	Score
Forrest	Gangur	5–12, 8–3, 1–0
Hembrow	Goda	9–1, 7–5
Alyani	Craig	7–1, 5–3
Merrien	Mills	6–7, 6–4, 1–0
Inch	McSparran	10–0, 9–3
Yu	Nathan	8–4, 7–2
Piketh	Rixon	3–6, 7–2, 1–0
Williams	Cottrell	4–4, 6–5

Quarter finals

Player 1	Player 2	Score
Forrest	Hembrow	11–1, 10–5
Alyani	Merrien	5–7, 6–5, 1–0
Inch	Yu	7–6, 8–3
Williams	Piketh	5–7, 5–4, 2–0

Semi finals

Player 1	Player 2	Score
Forrest	Alyani	6–3, 5–3
Inch	Williams	9–7, 4–7, 2–0

Final

Player 1	Player 2	Score
Forrest	Inch	6–5, 2–8, 1–0

=== Mixed pairs ===
First round

Section 1
Pos	Name	W	D	L	Pts
1	(Jersey) De Sousa & Kivlin	3	3	0	6
2	(Malaysia) Dzulkeple & Alyani	3	2	1	4
3	(Fiji) Mohammed & (Australia) Lauren Banks	3	1	2	2
4	(Botswana) Sepetsolo & Makhupe	3	0	3	0

Section 2
Pos	Name	W	D	L	Pts
1	(Malta) Lorimer & Rixon	3	3	1	6
2	(Hong Kong) Lam & Yu	3	1	2	2
3	(South Africa) Rittmuller & Piketh	3	1	2	2
4	(Switzerland) Mertz & Kuenzle	3	1	2	2

Section 3
Pos	Name	W	D	L	Pts
1	(Scotland) Stepney & Forrest	3	3	0	6
2	(Tonga) Smith & Nathan	3	2	1	4
3	(Philippines) Dagpin & Baronda	3	1	2	2
4	(Norfolk Island) Jones & Wilson	3	0	3	0

Section 4
Pos	Name	W	D	L	Pts
1	(Namibia) Olivier & Breedt	3	3	0	6
2	Nicholl & Mills	3	1	2	2
3	(Canada) Kirby & Ng	3	1	2	2
4	(Hungary) Pavelka & (Australia) Serena Bonnell	3	1	2	2

Section 5
Pos	Name	W	D	L	Pts
1	(Guernsey) Merrien & Merrien	3	2	1	4 (+13)
2	(New Zealand) Kelly & Inch	3	2	1	4 (+2)
3	(Macau) Ng & (China) Lai	3	1	2	2
4	(Cook Islands) Aperau & Rahui	3	1	2	2

Section 6
Pos	Name	W	D	L	Pts
1	(Wales) Salmon & Williams	4	4	0	8
2	(Japan) Kawamoto & Goda	4	3	1	6
3	(Jamaica) Edwards & (Australia) Grace Moloney	4	2	2	4
4	(Sri Lanka) Ramanayake & Magos	4	1	3	2
5	(Kenya) Wambugu & Ndungu	4	0	4	0

Section 7
Pos	Name	W	D	L	Pts
1	(Australia) Sherriff & Cottrell	4	4	0	8
2	(Scotland) Milne & Craig	4	2	2	4
3	(Thailand) Kadkhunthod & Gangur	4	2	2	4
4	(United States) Marzonie & McSparran	4	1	3	2
5	Alexander & (Israel) Levy	4	1	3	2

Section 8
Pos	Name	W	D	L	Pts
1	(England) Puckett & Hembrow	4	3	1	6 (+48)
2	(Sweden) Palmkvist & (Australia) Chloe Morrison	4	3	1	6 (+10)
3	(Netherlands) De Vries & Spangenberg	4	2	2	4
4	(Turkey) Akar & Kapusuz	4	1	3	2
5	(Singapore) Loh & Leng	4	1	3	2

Quarter finals

Player 1	Player 2	Score
Puckett & Hembrow	Lorimer & Rixon	1–10, 6–3, 1–0
Sherriff & Cottrell	De Sousa & Kivlin	12–1, 4–2
Stepney & Forrest	Olivier & Breedt	7–2, 9–2
Merrien & Merrien	Salmon & Williams	7–7, 9-5

Semi finals

Player 1	Player 2	Score
Sherriff & Cottrell	Puckett & Hembrow	9–1, 7–1
Stepney & Forrest	Merrien & Merrien	4–3, 3–8, 1–0

Final

Player 1	Player 2	Score
Sherriff & Cottrell	Stepney & Forrest	5–4, 6–5
