= Scott Edwards (bowls) =

Personal information
- Nationality: British (English)
- Born: 1973 (age 52–53)

Sport
- Sport: Lawn & indoor bowls
- Club: Westlecot
- Partner: Lucy Smith
Medal record
English Nationals
| Gold medal – first place | 2026 | pairs |

Scott Edwards is an English male indoor and lawn bowler.

== Bowls career ==
He has qualified for the World Indoor Bowls Championships on six occasions in 2013, 2018, 2019, 2020, 2021, 2022 & 2023. Edwards reached the quarter-final of the singles in 2019 losing out to Les Gillett and the semi-final of the pairs in 2022.

In the International Open he has knocked out two world champions, in 2017 he defeated Paul Foster and in 2018 he defeated Mark Dawes. He finished the 2017/18 season ranked number 1 in the Open Singles Circuit with a record points score of 490. In 2018/19 he was ranked PBA European No.1

He was the National singles runner-up in 2010 during the Men's National Championships. He is two times winner of the Bournemouth Open.

As of 2023, he is the World No.19 indoors, Open Singles Circuit No.1

== UK Career wins ==
- Bournemouth Open Singles x2
- Bournemouth Open Triples x3
- Worthing Pavilion Open Singles x2
- Atherley Open Singles (outdoor)
- Cheltenham Open Singles x2
- Hove Open Singles
- Worthing Open Singles
- Salisbury Open Singles
- Adur Open Singles
- Welford Open Singles
- Loddon Vale Open Singles
- Dolphin Open Singles x2
- Five Rivers Open Singles
- Atherley Open Singles (indoor)
- Daventry Open Singles
- North Wilts Open Singles
- Desborough Open Singles
- Palmerston Open Singles x2
- Wellingborough Open Singles
- Donyngs Open Singles
- Seven consecutive Open pairs titles over 3 years at the Bournemouth Open, Worthing Open and Hove Open

== Occupation ==
Scott was a full time professional poker player between the years of 2010 and 2016.
