= Carla Banks =

Scottish lawn and indoor bowler (born 1999)

Personal information
- Nationality: British (Scottish)
- Born: 8 February 1999 (age 27)

Sport
- Sport: Lawn bowls
- Club: Inverurie BC (outdoors); Garioch IBC (indoors)
Medal record
Women's bowls
Representing Scotland
World Outdoor Championships
Bronze medal – third place	2023 Gold Coast	fours
European Championships
Silver medal – second place	2024 Ayr	triples
Silver medal – second place	2024 Ayr	fours

Carla Banks (born 1999) is a Scottish international lawn and indoor bowler.

== Bowls career ==
Banks won the 2015 Under 18 National Singles and the 2017 Under 25 National Singles.

In 2020, she was selected for the 2020 World Outdoor Bowls Championship in Australia, as the women's team travelling reserve but the event was cancelled due to the COVID-19 pandemic. She made her debut at the World Indoor Championships during the 2021 World Indoor Bowls Championship and reached the mixed pairs final with Robert Paxton before losing out to Stewart Anderson and Julie Forrest in the final.

In 2023, she was selected as part of the team to represent Scotland at the 2023 World Outdoor Bowls Championship. She participated in the women's triples and the women's fours events. In the fours, her team won the bronze medal. Banks won double silver in the triples and fours at the 2024 European Bowls Championships.

== Family ==
Her father Colin Banks and her brother Jason Banks are both international bowlers.
