= Chloe Watson =

Chloe Watson may refer to:

- Chloe Watson (bowls)
- Chloe Watson (boxer)
