= 2023 World Bowls Championship =

2023 World Bowls Championship may refer to:

- 2023 World Outdoor Bowls Championship (the sport's blue riband event)
- 2023 World Indoor Bowls Championship (organised by the World Bowls Tour)
- 2023 World Bowls Indoor Championships (organised by World Bowls)
