= Stuart Irwin =

English lawn and indoor bowls player

Personal information
- Nationality: British (English)
- Born: 1982

Sport
- Club: Aspatria BC (outdoor/indoor)

Stuart Irwin (born 1982) is an English indoor bowler.

== Bowls career ==
Irwin started bowling aged 13 and made his debut at the World Championships during the 2018 World Indoor Bowls Championship in the open pairs with Kevin Harrison but they were defeated by Andy Thomson and Mark Royal. During the same year he was part of the record breaking Cumbria team that won the 2018 Denny Cup.

Three years later he participated in the singles and pairs at the 2021 World Indoor Bowls Championship, reaching the semi-finals of the open pairs with Jack Bird.

In 2023, he represented England in the British Isles series.

== Personal life ==
He is a bricklayer by trade.
