= Amy Stanton =

Amy Walters (née Stanton)
Personal information
- Nationality: British (English)
- Born: May 1, 1989 (age 37)

Sport
- Sport: bowls
- Club: Welford-on-Avon IBC/Broadway BC
Medal record
European Championships
Gold medal – first place	2015 Israel	pairs
Gold medal – first place	2015 Israel	mixed pairs
Gold medal – first place	2015 Israel	team

Amy Walters (née Amy Stanton) is an English international lawn and indoor bowler and a Bowls England official.

== Bowls career ==
Walters (as Amy Stanton) won the 2011 Women's Junior Pairs Champions National title. The following year Amy Stanton became the first female to win the women's WIBC Championships three years running.

In 2014 she became the Women's Junior Singles Champion and she was a semi finalist in the 2015 World Indoor Bowls Championship & 2017 World Indoor Bowls Championship.

In 2015, he won three gold medals at the European Bowls Championships in Israel.

Stanton has twice won the Mixed National titles in 2016 & 2017 with Andy Walters. In between the two titles she married Andy Walters on 22 April 2017.
