= Devon Cooper =

English bowler

Personal information
- Nationality: British (English)
- Born: August 2001

Sport
- Club: Baldock Town BC (outdoor); Riverain BC (indoor)
Medal record
Representing England
European Championships
| Bronze medal – third place | 2019 Guernsey | pairs |
| Bronze medal – third place | 2019 Guernsey | team |

Devon Cooper (born 2001) is a female English international outdoor and indoor bowler.

== Bowls career ==
Cooper won the English Junior National pairs title in 2018 and was runner-up the following year, bowling for Hertfordshire. Also in 2019, bowling with her pairs partner Rachael Tremlett, she won the 2019 British Isles Junior Pairs Championship and was subsequently nominated for the Bowls England Junior Woman Bowler of the Year. In 2019, she was called up to make her English international debut for the BIWBC International Series and won two bronze medals at the European Bowls Championships.

Indoors, she became the youngest ever national pairs winner in 2016 and made her debut at the World Championships during the 2020 World Indoor Bowls Championship. During the 2021 World Indoor Bowls Championship, she reached the women's singles semi finals after defeating the defending champion Julie Forrest in the first round.

== Personal life ==
Cooper is a student at Durham University.
