= William Moulton (bowls) =

English lawn bowls player

Personal information
- Nationality: British (English)
- Born: 1999 Sidcup, England

Sport
- Sport: bowls
- Club: VCD BC / Atherley IBC
Medal record
Men's bowls
Representing England
World Indoor Bowls Championships
Gold medal – first place	2020 Yarmouth	U25 singles

William Moulton (born 1999), is an English bowls player who won the World Under-25 title at the 2020 World Indoor Bowls Championship and is a junior international. As reigning champion, he was knocked out of the 2022 World Indoor Bowls Championship by Daniel Pool.

Moulton attended the University of Southampton and bowls outdoors for the VCD Club and indoors for the Atherley Club.
