= Lea Blackham =

British lawn bowler (born 1950)

Personal information
- Nationality: British (English)
- Born: 1950 (age 75–76)

Sport
- Sport: Indoor bowls
- Club: Ipswich IBC

Lea Blackham from Polstead, (born 1950), is an English male indoor bowler.

== Career ==
Blackham is an England Senior National Champion and qualified from the Bromley playoffs to play in the 2018 World Indoor Bowls Championship. He started bowling at the age of 53 at the Sudbury Bowls Club but now bowls indoors for the Ipswich IBC and is the Boxford Bowls Club chairman.
