= Katherine Rednall =

English bowls player (born 1996)

Personal information
- Born: 7 January 1996 (age 30) Ipswich, England

Sport
- Club: Ipswich & District (indoors); Felixstowe & Suffolk BC (outdoors)

Achievements and titles
- Highest world ranking: 2 (August 2026)
Medal record
Representing England
World Outdoor Championships
| Bronze medal – third place | 2023 Gold Coast | singles |
| Silver medal – second place | 2023 Gold Coast | team |
Commonwealth Games
| Bronze medal – third place | 2018 Gold Coast | triples |
| Gold medal – first place | 2026 Glasgow | singles |
Bowls World Cup
| Silver medal – second place | 2025 Kuala Lumpur | singles |
World Indoor Bowls Championships
| Gold medal – first place | 2014 Great Yarmouth | singles |
| Gold medal – first place | 2016 Great Yarmouth | mixed pair |
| Gold medal – first place | 2017 Great Yarmouth | singles |
| Gold medal – first place | 2018 Great Yarmouth | singles |
| Gold medal – first place | 2022 Great Yarmouth | singles |
| Gold medal – first place | 2023 Great Yarmouth | singles |
| Gold medal – first place | 2024 Great Yarmouth | singles |
| Gold medal – first place | 2026 Great Yarmouth | singles |
| Silver medal – second place | 2021 Great Yarmouth | singles |
European Championships
| Bronze medal – third place | 2019 Guernsey | mixed four |
| Bronze medal – third place | 2019 Guernsey | team |

Katherine Rednall (born 7 January 1996) is an English lawn and indoor bowler from Stowmarket. She is record seven times women's world indoor singles champion. She reached a career high ranking (outdoors) of world number 2 in August 2026.

== Bowls career ==
=== Indoors ===
Rednall became the youngest ever winner of a World Indoor Bowls title after she won the 2014 World Indoor Bowls Championship Women's Singles at the age of just 18. Rednall reached the final of the 2015 World Indoor Bowls Championship losing out to Laura Thomas in the decider. Rednall experienced further success after winning the Mixed Pairs title in 2016 with bowls partner Darren Burnett.

She won a second singles title in 2017 after defeating Ellen Falkner in the final and a third singles title during the 2018 World Indoor Bowls Championship defeating Rebecca Field in the final.

During the 2021 World Indoor Bowls Championship she was seven months pregnant and performed well reaching the women's final, the mixed pairs semi final and was also the first woman to reach the Open singles quarter final. The following year during the 2022 World Indoor Bowls Championship, she won a record breaking fourth singles title.

At the 2023 World Indoor Bowls Championship, Rednall won her fifth women's singles to extend her record, she fought back after losing the first set to defeat Ceri Ann Glen in the tie break set. Rednall started the year of 2024 in fine form, winning her sixth singles title at the 2024 World Indoor Bowls Championship, where she defeated Julie Forrest in the final.

Having had to go through qualifying to get into the event, Rednall won her seventh world indoor title at the 2026 championship, defeating Nicole Rogers in the final which went to a deciding tiebreak.

At the 2026 Commonwealth Games, which was played indoors in Glasgow, Rednall won the gold medal in the women's singles, defeating Guernsey's Alison Merrien in the final.

=== Outdoors ===
She was selected as part of the English team for the 2018 Commonwealth Games on the Gold Coast in Queensland where she won a bronze medal in the Triples with Ellen Falkner and Sian Honnor. In 2019, she won two bronze medals at the European Bowls Championships.

In 2020, she was selected for the 2020 World Outdoor Bowls Championship in Australia but the event was cancelled due to the COVID-19 pandemic. In 2023, she was selected again as part of the team to represent England at the 2023 World Outdoor Bowls Championship. She participated in the women's singles and the women's triples events. In the singles, Rednall won her group before reaching the semi final where she lost to Kelly McKerihen.

In November 2025, she won the silver medal at the 2025 Bowls World Cup, losing to Emma Firyana Saroji in the final

== Personal life ==
Rednall is the daughter of England international John Rednall. She studied for a degree in fashion and textiles at the University of Essex and enjoys playing the saxophone.
