= Jack Bird (bowls) =

British indoor bowler

Personal information
- Nationality: British (English)
- Born: 1997

Sport
- Club: Scarborough (indoor)

Jack Bird (born 1997) is an English international indoor bowler.

== Bowls career ==
In 2013 Bird won the Yorkshire singles and under-25 singles. Five years later in 2018 he became the English indoor champion after winning the National Men's Indoor Singles title defeating Ryan Whitlock 21–10. He subsequently won the British Isles Indoor title the following year which included a final win over multiple world champion Paul Foster.

He made his debut at the World Championships during the 2021 World Indoor Bowls Championship reaching the semi-finals of the open pairs with Stuart Irwin.

== Personal life ==
He is a motor mechanic by trade.
