= Laura Daniels =

Welsh bowls player (born 1985)

Personal information
- Nationality: British (Welsh)
- Born: Laura Thomas; 31 May 1985 (age 41) Neath, Wales

Sport
- Sport: Lawn & indoor bowls
- Club: Brynhyfryd Bowls Club
Medal record
World Outdoor Championships
| Gold medal – first place | 2016 Christchurch | Women's pairs |
| Silver medal – second place | 2016 Christchurch | Women's team |
Commonwealth Games
| Silver medal – second place | 2018 Gold Coast | Women's singles |
World Indoor Championships
| Gold medal – first place | 2013 Yarmouth | Mixed pairs |
| Gold medal – first place | 2014 Yarmouth | Mixed pairs |
| Gold medal – first place | 2015 Yarmouth | Women's singles |
| Gold medal – first place | 2021 Yarmouth | Women's singles |
Atlantic Bowls Championships
| Silver medal – second place | 2015 Paphos | fours |
British Isles Championships
| Gold medal – first place | 2017 | singles |

Laura Daniels (née Laura Thomas; born 31 May 1985) is a Welsh lawn and indoor bowler.

== Bowls career ==
=== World Outdoor Championship ===
In 2016, Daniels won the gold medal with Jess Sims in the pairs at the 2016 World Outdoor Bowls Championship in Christchurch. In 2020, she was selected for the 2020 World Outdoor Bowls Championship in Australia but the event was cancelled due to the COVID-19 pandemic.

In 2023, she was selected as part of the team to represent Wales at the 2023 World Outdoor Bowls Championship. She participated in the women's triples and the women's fours events. In the fours, her team reached the quarter final before being beaten by England.

=== Commonwealth Games ===
She was selected as part of the Welsh team for the 2018 Commonwealth Games on the Gold Coast in Queensland where she claimed a silver medal in the Singles losing out to Jo Edwards in the final.

In 2022, she competed in the women's singles and the women's triples at the 2022 Commonwealth Games.

=== World Indoor Championship ===
Laura won the Women's singles title at the 2015 World Indoor Bowls Championship defeating defending champion Katherine Rednall in the final. Daniels claimed a second singles title in 2021 by beating Katherine Rednall again, in a repeat of the 2015 final.

Additionally she partnered with Paul Foster to win World Indoor Bowl's Mixed Pairs titles in 2013 and 2014.

=== National ===
After her 2016 Welsh National Bowls Championships singles success, she subsequently won the singles at the British Isles Bowls Championships in 2017. She also won the Welsh National singles title in 2018.

== Personal life ==
Her brother Ben Thomas is also a multiple Welsh National Bowls Championships title winner.
