= Connor Milne =

Scottish lawn bowler

Personal information
- Nationality: British (Scottish)
- Born: 1994 (age 31–32)

Sport
- Club: Turriff BC (indoor)
Medal record
Representing Scotland
European Championships
Silver medal – second place	2019 Guernsey	pairs
Silver medal – second place	2019 Guernsey	team
Gold medal – first place	2022 Ayr	fours

Connor Milne (born 1994) is a Scottish international lawn and indoor bowler.

== Bowls career ==
In 2019, Milne was selected for the European Bowls Championships, where he won two silver medals in the pairs and team events.

In January 2020, he won the Scottish Indoor National title bowling for the Turriff Bowls Club, defeating Colin Walker in the final.

He made his indoor debut at the World Championships during the 2021 World Indoor Bowls Championship. The following year in 2022, he won fours gold at the European Bowls Championships.
