= Jamie Walker (bowls) =

English international bowls player (born 1991)

Personal information
- Nationality: British (English)
- Born: 20 December 1991 (age 34) Northampton, England

Sport
- Club: Culm Vale

Achievements and titles
- Highest world ranking: 9 (September 2024)
Medal record
Men's bowls
Representing England
World Outdoor Championships
Gold medal – first place	2016 Christchurch	triples
Bronze medal – third place	2023 Gold Coast	triples
Commonwealth Games
Silver medal – second place	2022 Birmingham	Men's pairs
Silver medal – second place	2026 Glasgow	men's pairs
Atlantic Bowls Championships
Gold medal – first place	2015 Paphos	singles
Bronze medal – third place	2015 Paphos	triples
Gold medal – first place	2019 Cardiff	singles
Gold medal – first place	2019 Cardiff	pairs
European Championships
Gold medal – first place	2013 Spain	mixed
Gold medal – first place	2013 Spain	team
World Indoor Bowls Championships
Gold medal – first place	2023 Yarmouth	singles
Gold medal – first place	2026 Yarmouth	mixed pairs
British Bowls Championships
Gold medal – first place	2025 Llandrindod Wells	singles

Jamie Walker (born 20 December 1991) is an English international bowls player. He reached a career high ranking of world number 9 in September 2024.

== Bowls career ==
=== Outdoors ===
In 2013, he won two gold medals at the European Bowls Championships in Spain.

He was named as the 2015 Thomas Taylor 'Bowler of the Year' after securing a National title in 2015 and winning the singles gold medal and the triples bronze medal at the Atlantic Bowls Championships. In 2016 he won two more National titles, the Junior singles and Mixed fours at Leamington Spa.

In December 2016 he was part of the triples team with Andy Knapper and Robert Paxton who won the gold medal at the 2016 World Outdoor Bowls Championship in Christchurch.

By the end of 2017 he had won six National Championship titles in 2011, 2013, 2015 (x 2), 2016 and 2017.

In 2019 he won the singles and pairs gold medal at the Atlantic Bowls Championships and in 2020 he was selected for the 2020 World Outdoor Bowls Championship in Australia.

In 2022, he competed in the men's singles and the men's pairs at the 2022 Commonwealth Games. Partnering Sam Tolchard he won the pairs silver medal, losing out to Wales in the final.

In 2023, he was selected as part of the team to represent England at the 2023 World Outdoor Bowls Championship. He participated in the men's triples and the men's fours events. In the triples with Nick Brett and Louis Ridout, he won the bronze medal.

In 2024, Walker defeated Harry Goodwin in the men's singles final at the 2024 national championships to record his second singles title success and subsequently won the singles at the 2025 British Championships. In the summer of 2025 he won a 11th national title after claiming the triples.

=== Indoors ===
Walker made a sensational debut at the 2023 World Indoor Bowls Championship by winning the singles event, beating Jason Banks in the final.

At the 2026 World Indoor Bowls Championship he teamed up with Chloe Wilson to win the mixed pairs title.

At the 2026 Commonwealth Games, which was played indoors in Glasgow , he combined with Nick Brett to win the silver medal in the men's pairs, losing to Northern Ireland's Gary Kelly and Adam McKeown on a tiebreak end in the final.

=== National titles ===
- 2011 junior singles
- 2013 junior singles
- 2014 mixed pairs
- 2014 mixed fours
- 2016 junior singles
- 2017 singles
- 2015 2w singles
- 2015 CofC singles
- 2016 mixed fours
- 2024 singles
- 2025 triples
