= Chloe Watson (bowls) =

Irish lawn and Indoor bowler

Personal information
- Nationality: British (Northern Irish)
- Born: 1997 (age 28–29) Dundonald
- Education: Bangor Academy and Sixth Form College
- Occupation: Sales person extrodannaire @ KN

Sport
- Country: Ireland
- Sport: Lawn & Indoor Bowls
- Club: Northern Ireland Civil Service (outdoors); Belfast BC (indoors).
Medal record
Representing combined Ireland
World Indoor Bowls Championships
Gold medal – first place	World U25 singles Potters	2018
IIBC Championships
Silver medal – second place	U25 Mixed Pairs	2013
Gold medal – first place	World U25 Ladies Singles	2014
Silver medal – second place	U25 Mixed Pairs	2014
Silver medal – second place	Mixed Pairs	2015
Silver medal – second place	Ladies Singles	2016
Silver medal – second place	Mixed Pairs	2016
Silver medal – second place	U25 Ladies Singles	2017
Gold medal – first place	World Ladies Singles	2017
National Indoor Championships
Gold medal – first place	Ladies Under 25s Singles	2013
Gold medal – first place	Ladies Under 25s Singles	2014
Gold medal – first place	Ladies Triples	2014
Gold medal – first place	Ladies Under 25s Singles	2015
Gold medal – first place	Ladies Singles	2015
Gold medal – first place	Ladies Triples	2015
Gold medal – first place	Ladies Fours	2015
Gold medal – first place	Ladies Under 25s Singles	2016
Gold medal – first place	Ladies Singles	2016
Gold medal – first place	Ladies Pairs	2016
Gold medal – first place	Ladies Triples	2016
Gold medal – first place	Ladies Fours	2016
Gold medal – first place	Ladies Under 25s Singles	2017
Gold medal – first place	Ladies Singles	2017
Gold medal – first place	Ladies Triples	2017
Gold medal – first place	Ladies Fours	2017
Gold medal – first place	Ladies Under 25s Singles	2018
Silver medal – second place	Ladies Singles	2018
Gold medal – first place	Ladies Pairs	2018
Gold medal – first place	Ladies Triples	2018
Gold medal – first place	Ladies Fours	2018
Gold medal – first place	Ladies Triples	2022
British Indoor Championships
Gold medal – first place	Mixed Under 18s Pairs	2014
Silver medal – second place	Ladies Under 25s Singles	2014
Silver medal – second place	Ladies Singles	2015
Silver medal – second place	Ladies Singles	2017
Gold medal – first place	Ladies Triples	2017
Gold medal – first place	Ladies Pairs	2018
National Outdoor Championships
Gold medal – first place	Under 25 Singles
Gold medal – first place	Under 25 Singles
Gold medal – first place	Under 25 Pairs	2016
Gold medal – first place	Triples	2016

Chloe Watson (born 1997) is an Irish international lawn and Indoor bowler.

== Bowls career ==
Beginning her career within the sport of Bowls in 2008, Watson gained her first International cap at the age of 10 representing Ireland in Cardiff, Wales. Since then, Chloe has played 195+ games representing Ireland and has been named The Belfast Telegraphs Sports Person of the Year.

=== Indoor ===
Watson has won over 30 Irish national indoor titles and to date is the only Irish Lady in history to hold all 5 titles in 1 year (2016), U25 Singles, Ladies Singles, Ladies Pairs, Ladies Triples & Ladies Fours; the singles, triples and fours in 2015, 2016 and 2017 and the pairs in 2016. She is also a winner of the World IIBC Under-25 Women's singles title and won the 2017 World IIBC Senior Championship in Swansea to seal her place in the 2018 World Indoor Bowls Championship (Potters) which she also went on to win at Under 25 level.

=== Outdoor ===
She won the 2016 triples title at the Irish National Bowls Championships bowling for the Northern Ireland Civil Service (NICS) Bowls Club & U25 Pairs as well as being a several times U25 singles winner
