= Perry Martin =

British lawn and indoor bowler

Personal information
- Nationality: British (English)
- Born: 9 March 1993 (age 32)

Sport
- Sport: Lawn & indoor bowls
- Club: Boscombe Cliff (outdoors); Dolphin (indoors)

Perry Martin (born 1993) is an English international lawn and Indoor bowler.

== Bowls career ==
He won the Men's Champion of Champions Singles Champions in 2016 at the National Championships. Martin was the 2015 National Junior Championship Runner-up.

As of 2020 he was ranked number 20 in the world (indoors). Martin reached the quarterfinals of men's singles at the 2021 World Indoor Bowls Championship but he and his quarterfinal opponent Wayne Willgress were both forced to withdraw following a positive Coronavirus test.
