= Robert Paxton (bowls) =

English bowls player (born 1978)

Personal information
- Nationality: British (English)
- Born: 11 June 1978 (age 48) Exeter
- Occupation: Sales manager at Bond Bowls
- Employer: Bond Bowls

Sport
- Sport: Bowls
- Club: Crediton & Exonia

Achievements and titles
- Highest world ranking: 12 (August 2026)
Medal record
Representing England
World Outdoor Championships
Gold medal – first place	2016 Christchurch	triples
Commonwealth Games
Bronze medal – third place	2018 Gold Coast	singles
World Indoor Bowls Championships
Gold medal – first place	2015	Men's pairs
Gold medal – first place	2015	Mixed pairs
Silver medal – second place	2016	Men's singles
Silver medal – second place	2018	Men's singles
Gold medal – first place	2019	Mixed pairs
Gold medal – first place	2020	Men's singles
Silver medal – second place	2021	Mixed Pairs
Silver medal – second place	2025	Men's singles
Silver medal – second place	2025	Men's Pairs
Gold medal – first place	2026	Men's singles
European Championships
Gold medal – first place	2013 Spain	mixed
Gold medal – first place	2013 Spain	team

Robert Paxton (born 11 June 1978) is an English international outdoor and indoor bowls player. He reached a career high ranking of world number 12 in August 2026, although he has previously carried a ranking of number 2 on the World Bowls Tour.

== Bowls career ==
Robert is from Crediton, Devon and plays out of the Exonia club indoors and out of Crediton BC. and won the 2011 Scottish International Open. In 2013, he won two gold medals at the European Bowls Championships in Spain.

In 2015 Paxton partnered Simon Skelton when they won the 2015 World Indoor Bowls Championship Pairs title and the 2015 world mixed pairs title with Marion Purcell and he held a career high world indoor ranking of 2 in 2015. The following year he was runner up in the singles in the 2016 World Indoor Bowls Championship, beaten in the final by Nick Brett.

In December 2016, he was part of the triples team with Andy Knapper and Jamie Walker who won the gold medal at the 2016 World Outdoor Bowls Championship in Christchurch.

In 2018, he reached the World Indoor Bowls Championship open singles final losing out to Mark Dawes in a hard fought final. Dawes had been the player of the tournament and Paxton did well to take the final to a tie break. He was also selected as part of the English team for the 2018 Commonwealth Games on the Gold Coast in Queensland where he won a bronze medal in the Singles.

In 2019, he won the mixed pairs gold with Ellen Falkner at the 2019 World Indoor Bowls Championship. The following year he finally won the world indoor open singles title after reaching his third final at the 2020 World Indoor Bowls Championship and was also selected for the 2020 World Outdoor Bowls Championship in Australia.

Having been runner-up in 2025, Paxton went one better and won his second world indoor open singles title at the 2026 World Indoor Bowls Championship, defeating Paul Foster in the final which went all the way to a third tie-break end after both sets were tied.
