= Wayne Willgress =

English lawn and indoor bowls player

Personal information
- Nationality: English
- Born: 31 August 1988 (age 37) Mulbarton, Norfolk, England

Sport
- Sport: Lawn & indoor bowls
- Club: Norfolk BC (indoors & outdoors)
Medal record
Representing England
Men's lawn bowls
English Nationals
Gold medal – first place	2007	triples
Gold medal – first place	2021	pairs
Gold medal – first place	2023	mixed pairs

Wayne Willgress (born 1988) in Mulbarton, Norfolk, is an English male lawn and indoor bowler.

== Bowls career ==
Willgress was an England Junior international and was the National triples champion in 2007 and singles runner-up in 2012 during the Men's National Championships.

He knocked out the world number one Greg Harlow to reach the semi-finals of the 2018 World Indoor Bowls Championship. Willgress reached the quarter-finals of Men's Singles at the 2021 World Indoor Bowls Championship but he and his quarter final opponent Perry Martin were both forced to withdraw following a positive Coronavirus test.

In 2021, he won the pairs National title with John Tufts. Two years later, he won another national title at the 2023 Bowls England National Finals, partnering his wife Rebecca in the mixed pairs.

== Personal life ==
His wife is England international Rebecca Willgress, formerly Rebecca Field. He works as a self-employed painter and decorator.
