= Martin Puckett =

English lawn and Indoor bowler

Personal information
- Nationality: British (English)
- Born: 1992 (age 33–34)

Sport
- Sport: Lawn & indoor bowls
- Club: indoors Moonfleet 2002–2017; Dorchester 2018 outdoors Greenhill 2009-
Medal record
Men's bowls
Representing England

Martin Puckett (born 1992) is an English international male lawn and Indoor bowler.

== Biography ==
He won the National Junior title in 2014. In 2015 he was selected for the England team for the 2015 British Isles Senior International Series.

In 2019, Puckett won the senior mixed doubles title with Devon Cooper at the IIBC Championships.

In February 2019, Puckett won the Men's English National Indoor Singles Champion of Champions.

In March 2022, Puckett won the Men's English National Indoor Singles Championship.
