= James Rippey =

British bowler (born 1977)

Personal information
- Nationality: British (Scottish/English)
- Born: 1977 (age 47–48) Scotland

Sport
- Sport: Bowls
- Club: Colchester Indoor Bowls Club, Essex (Indoors) & West Lothian (Indoors)

James Rippey (born 1977) is a Scottish born international indoor and lawn bowler who has represented both Scotland and England. He was a regular qualifier for World Bowls Tour events and was ranked as high as world number 17. As of 2019, he was ranked 21 by the World Bowls Tour.

== Career ==
Rippey won the Scottish national fours title aged just 17. He went on to captain the U25s England outdoor side and has won English indoor Singles, Pairs and Triples titles. He qualified for the 2016, 2017, 2019 (Singles & Pairs), 2020, 2021, 2022 and 2024 (Singles and Pairs) World Indoor Bowls Championships.

James has qualified for the PBA Scottish International Open in 2018, 2022, 2023 and 2024. In 2018, he defeated the world champion Mark Dawes in the first round of the Scottish International Open.
