= Jamie Chestney =

English bowls player (born 1986)

Personal information
- Nationality: British (English)
- Born: 15 November 1986 (age 39) Kings Lynn, England

Sport
- Club: Culm Vale (outdoor); Exonia BC (indoor)
Medal record
Representing England
Commonwealth Games
Silver medal – second place	2014 Glasgow	fours
Bronze medal – third place	2018 Gold Coast	fours
Gold medal – first place	2022 Birmingham	triples
Bronze medal – third place	2022 Birmingham	fours
World Outdoor Championships
Bronze medal – third place	2012 Adelaide	pairs
World Indoor Bowls Championships
Gold medal – first place	2018 Yarmouth	pairs
Gold medal – first place	2018 Yarmouth	Mixed pairs
Gold medal – first place	2021 Yarmouth	pairs
Atlantic Bowls Championships
Gold medal – first place	2011 Paphos	singles
Gold medal – first place	2011 Paphos	triples
English Nationals
Gold medal – first place	2004	pairs
Gold medal – first place	2009	junior singles
Gold medal – first place	2021	cofc
Gold medal – first place	2025	triples

Jamie Chestney (born 15 November 1986) is an English male international lawn and indoor bowler.

== Bowls career ==
=== International achievements ===
His first major international medal came in 2011 when he won the singles and triples gold medals at the Atlantic Bowls Championships. The following year he gained a bronze medal at the 2012 World Outdoor Bowls Championship in the pairs competition with Graham Shadwell. Two years later he competed for England in the men's fours at the 2014 Commonwealth Games where he won a silver medal.

He finished runner-up in the 2016 International Open and the following year won the Cooperative Funeralcare International Open.

In 2018, he won the World Indoor Open Pairs title with Mark Dawes and then won the Mixed Pairs title the following day with Lesley Doig.

In 2018 he was also selected as part of the English team for the 2018 Commonwealth Games on the Gold Coast in Queensland where he claimed a bronze medal in the Fours with David Bolt, Louis Ridout and Sam Tolchard.

Chestney won a third world indoor title when winning the open pairs at the 2021 World Indoor Bowls Championship for the second time with Mark Dawes.

In 2022, he competed in the men's triples and the men's fours at the 2022 Commonwealth Games. The team of Chestney, Nick Brett and Louis Ridout won the triples gold medal and in the fours he also secured a bronze medal.

=== National achievements ===
Chestney is a four times national champion, winning National Championship titles in 2004, 2009, 2021 and 2025. Chestney was aged just 17 when he won the pairs title with Ian Wynter in 2004.

He was part of the Kings Bowls Club, who have won the Top Club championship four years running from 2016-2019. He then joined the Culm Vale club.

National titles

- 2004 Bowls England National Championships (men's pairs)
- 2009 Bowls England National Championships (Men's Junior Singles)
- 2021 Bowls England National Championships (Men's Champion of Champions)
- 2025 Bowls England National Championships (men's triples)
