= Daniel Salmon (bowls) =

Welsh bowls player (born 1994)

Personal information
- Nationality: British (Welsh)
- Born: 21 July 1994 (age 32)
- Home town: Cardiff, Wales

Sport
- Country: Wales
- Sport: Lawn & indoor bowls
- Club: Cardiff IBC / Penylan

Achievements and titles
- Highest world ranking: 8 (August 2024)
Medal record
Men's bowls
Representing Wales
Commonwealth Games
Gold medal – first place	2018 Gold Coast	pairs
Gold medal – first place	2022 Birmingham	pairs
World Singles Champion of Champions
Gold medal – first place	2023 Gold Coast	singles
World Indoor Championships
Silver medal – second place	2017 Yarmouth	Open pairs
Atlantic Bowls Championships
Bronze medal – third place	2019 Cardiff	singles
Hong Kong International Classic
Silver medal – second place	2025	singles
British Bowls Championships
Gold medal – first place	2025 Llandrindod Wells	triples
Welsh Nationals
Gold medal – first place	2022	singles
Gold medal – first place	2021, 2024	triples
Gold medal – first place	2022	fours

Daniel Salmon (born 21 July 1994) is a Welsh international lawn and indoor bowler. He reached a career high ranking of world number 8 in August 2024.

== Bowls career ==
He made his first indoor international appearance aged just 15 in 2010 becoming the youngest person to represent Wales indoors.

In 2017 he reached the final of the open pairs during the 2017 World Indoor Bowls Championship with his playing partner Damian Doubler and won the 2017 World Youth Championships at Broadbeach Bowls Club on Australia’s Gold Coast.

He was selected as part of the Welsh team for the 2018 Commonwealth Games on the Gold Coast in Queensland where he claimed a gold medal in the Pairs with Marc Wyatt.

In 2019, he won the singles bronze medal at the Atlantic Bowls Championships and in 2020 he was selected for the 2020 World Outdoor Bowls Championship in Australia but the event was cancelled due to the COVID-19 pandemic. In 2021, he won the men's triples title at the 2021 Welsh National Bowls Championships.

In 2022, he competed in the men's singles and the men's pairs at the 2022 Commonwealth Games. Salmon won his second consecutive Commonwealth pairs gold medal, but this time partnering Jarrad Breen. Shortly after the Games he went on to claim two national titles by winning both the singles and fours at the Welsh National Championships, bowling for Penylan.

In 2023, he was selected as part of the team to represent Wales at the 2023 World Outdoor Bowls Championship. He participated in the men's singles and the men's pairs events. In the pairs with Jarrad Breen, they reached the quarter finals before losing to Malaysia.

Shortly after the 2023 World Championships and still on the Gold Coast, Salmon won the World Singles Champion of Champions title to become the first Welsh men's winner of the event. He defeated Scot Darren Gualtieri in the final, 8–0, 3–2. Following success in the Welsh national triples he subsequently won the triples at the 2025 British Championships.

Salmon was chosen as Wales' 2026 Commonwealth Games opening ceremony baton bearer.
