= Potters Resorts =

British holiday company

Coordinates: 52.5343855°N 1.7299122°E

- Company type: Private company
- Industry: Leisure; Hospitality
- Founded: 1 January 1920 (first site, Hemsby)
- Founder: Herbert Potter
- Headquarters: Hopton-on-Sea, Norfolk, England
- Number of locations: 2
- Services: All-Inclusive Short Breaks
- Owners: The Potter Family
- Number of employees: 800
- Website: pottersresorts.com

Potters Resorts is a short breaks holiday company in the United Kingdom, operating two five-star resorts in Norfolk and Essex. The company has been privately owned by the Potter Family since opening its first location in Hemsby, Norfolk in 1920 after solicitors' clerk Herbert Potter won £500 in a Sunday Chronicle newspaper competition. It was called 'Potters' and is widely recognised as the first permanent and mixed use holiday camp in the United Kingdom, with timber huts for accommodation and permanent main buildings. 'Potters' moved to Hopton-on-Sea in 1924.

Now under the management of fourth generation John Potter, the company acquired a second location at Five Lakes Resort in Essex in 2021, which relaunched as Potters Resorts Five Lakes in 2022.

== Locations ==
Potters Resorts own and operate a coastal location at Hopton-on-Sea in Norfolk and a countryside location at Five Lakes in Maldon, Essex. Both resorts are open all year round.

Country	Resort	Nearest city or town	County	Nearest motorway or dual carriageway junction	Year opened
United Kingdom	Hopton-on-Sea	Great Yarmouth and Lowestoft	Norfolk	A47	1920 (originally in Hemsby)
United Kingdom	Five Lakes	Colchester and Tiptree	Essex	A12	2022

=== Hopton-on-Sea ===
Located in the small seaside village of Hopton-on-Sea between the towns of Gorleston, Norfolk and Lowestoft, Suffolk is the company's original Resort and current headquarters. 'Potters' first opened in 1920 at nearby Hemsby, close to Great Yarmouth, before moving to Hopton-on-Sea in 1924, close to the railway station. In 1934, having acquired new land by the seaside, 'Potters Beach Camp' was opened where Potters Resorts Hopton-on-Sea remains today.

=== Five Lakes ===
Located in the village of Tolleshunt Knights and close to the Blackwater Estuary National Nature Reserve, the site originally opened in 1974 as Manifold Golf Club. Under new ownership, Five Lakes Resort opened in 1995 complete with a 114-hotel room, a new golf course and additional spa facilities. The resort operated as a corporate hospitality venue until its acquisition by Potters Resorts in 2021.
