= Les Gillett =

English lawn bowls player

Personal information
- Nationality: British (English)
- Born: 17 November 1970 (age 56) North Cotswold, England

Sport
- Club: (indoor) Leicester (outdoor) Oxfordshire & Banbury Borough BC
Medal record
Representing England
World Indoor Championships
Gold medal – first place	2001 Yarmouth	Men's pairs
Gold medal – first place	2017 Yarmouth	Open pairs
Gold medal – first place	2022 Yarmouth	Open singles
British Isles Championships
Gold medal – first place	1995 Llanelli	fours
English Nationals
Gold medal – first place	1994	fours
Gold medal – first place	1998	fours

Leslie John Gillett (born 17 November 1970) is an English international indoor and lawn bowls player. He is nicknamed Razor.

== Bowls career ==
=== Indoor career ===
Gillett won the 2001 World Indoor Bowls Championship pairs title in Great Yarmouth with bowls partner Mark McMahon. Sixteen years later he won his second title when he won the Open pairs with Jason Greenslade at the 2017 World Indoor Bowls Championship in Great Yarmouth.

At the 2022 World Indoor Bowls Championship, Gillett (as the sixth seed) finally won the Open singles title after defeating five-time champion Paul Foster in a tie-break set in the final. Gillett won the first set by virtue of overtaking Foster's lead during the final ends. Foster comfortably won the second set before Gillett won the tie break.

Other major wins include the 1997 International Open and 2002 Welsh Open. He now represents the Leicester indoor club.

=== Outdoor career ===
Gillett is a two times winner at the National Championships in the (national fours) in 1994, when representing Cheltenham and Gloucestershire BC and 1998, when representing Oxfordshire and Banbury Borough BC. He has also been twice runner-up in the singles and won the national junior singles in 1993.

After the 1994 fours success Gillett subsequently won the 1995 British Isles Bowls Championships in Llanelli.

== Personal life ==
He is an estimator/buyer by trade and is married to Sadie Gillett with three children. In 2026 he was appointed the bowls manager at the Potters Leisure Resort.
