= Julie Forrest =

Scottish lawn and indoor bowler (born 1968)

Personal information
- Nationality: British (Scottish)
- Born: 3 November 1968 (age 57)

Sport
- Sport: Indoor Bowls, Lawn Bowls
- Club: Hawick BC

Achievements and titles
- Highest world ranking: 2 (March 2025)
Medal record
Representing Scotland
Women's Bowls
World Outdoor Championships
Silver medal – second place	2000 Johannesburg	fours
Bronze medal – third place	1996 Leamington Spa	team
Bronze medal – third place	2000 Johannesburg	team
World Indoor Championships
Gold medal – first place	2019 Yarmouth	singles
Gold medal – first place	2020 Yarmouth	singles
Gold medal – first place	2021 Yarmouth	mixed pairs
Gold medal – first place	2024 Yarmouth	mixed pairs
Gold medal – first place	2025 Yarmouth	singles
World Cup Singles
Silver medal – second place	2015 Warilla	Singles
British Isles Championships
Gold medal – first place	1998	triples
WB Indoor Championships
Gold medal – first place	2022 Bristol	singles
Gold medal – first place	2023 Warilla	singles

Julie Forrest (born 3 November 1968) is a Scottish bowls player. She reached a career high ranking of world number 2 in March 2025.

== Bowls career ==
=== Outdoors ===
Julie has won three World Outdoor medals, a silver medal in the fours at the 2000 World Outdoor Bowls Championship in Johannesburg and two bronze medals as part of the Scottish team that competed in the Taylor Trophy. She also competed at the 1996, 2000 and 2016.

She was selected to represent Scotland at the Commonwealth Games in 1998 and also won the Scottish National Bowls Championships pairs title in 1988 and triples title in 1997 bowling for Hawick.

=== Indoors ===
Most of her success has come indoors with her most significant wins being the three WBT women's singles titles and two WB women's singles titles.

Forrest competed in the 2015 World Cup Singles, where she won a silver medal after losing out to Siti Zalina Ahmad in the final, the event is the southern hemisphere equivalent of the World Indoor title. The following year, Forrest finished runner-up at the 2016 World Indoor Bowls Championship in the mixed pairs,

At the 2019 World Indoor Bowls Championship she defeated Alison Merrien in the final and at the 2020 World Indoor Bowls Championship, she defeated Janice Gower in the final.

Forrest went on to win her third World indoor title by winning the mixed pairs with Stewart Anderson at the 2021 World Indoor Bowls Championship.

She has won seven IIBC indoor titles, including a record four ladies singles titles (2004, 2010, 2013, 2014) and three mixed pairs titles (2002, 2003, 2013). Forrest also won the last three editions of the WBT Scottish Women's Masters. She is also a record six-time Scottish indoor champion and a three-time British Isles indoor champion in singles competition.

In 2022, Forrest won the women's singles at the inaugural World Bowls Indoor Championships, defeating Gloria Ha in the final. The following year she retained the title after beating Katelyn Inch in Warilla, Australia.

Forrest started 2024 in good form winning the 2024 World Indoor Bowls Championship mixed pairs with Nick Brett, as the pair bowled together for the first time in the Championships.

At the 2025 World Indoor Bowls Championship, she won her third ladies' singles title, defeating Beth Riva in the final.

== Awards ==
Forrest is a member of the Teviotdale Indoor Bowls Club in the Scottish Borders. She is also an Honorary Life Member of the Scottish Indoor Bowling Association (SIBA). Forrest has been playing with Tiger Bowls since 2003. She was inducted into the Scottish Borders Hall of Fame in 2007.
