= Mark Dawes =

English lawn bowler (born 1983)

Personal information
- Nationality: British (English)
- Born: 7 January 1983 (age 43)

Sport
- Sport: Lawn & indoor bowls

Achievements and titles
- Highest world ranking: 21 (November 2025)
Medal record
Men's bowls
Representing England
World Indoor Bowls Championships
Gold medal – first place	2018 Yarmouth	Open singles
Gold medal – first place	2018 Yarmouth	Open pairs
Gold medal – first place	2021 Yarmouth	Open singles
Gold medal – first place	2021 Yarmouth	Open pairs

Mark Dawes (born 1983) is an English international lawn and indoor bowler and a four times world indoor champion.

== Bowls career ==
He won the Men's National Junior title in 2005 at the National Championships. By 2014, he had reached a career high world indoor ranking of 8.

In 2018, he won the World Indoor Open Pairs title with Jamie Chestney. and then followed this by taking the World Open Singles Championship, defeating Robert Paxton in a hard fought final. Dawes had been the player of the tournament and Paxton did well to take the final to a tie break.

In 2020, his indoor club, Blackpool Newton Hall BC, permanently closed and Dawes was forced to find a new club.

Despite the loss of his club he won a third world indoor title when winning the open pairs at the 2021 World Indoor Bowls Championship for the second time with Jamie Chestney. Dawes then reproduced his good form to win the singles event for the second time, defeating Greg Harlow in the final 10-3 11-5 and record a fourth world indoor title in total.
