= 2022 World Bowls Indoor Championships =

Indoor Bowls Championship

- 1st
- Location: (England) County of Bristol IBC, Bristol
- Date: 25–29 April 2022

The 2022 World Bowls Indoor Championships took place at County of Bristol IBC, Bristol, England, from 25 to 29 April 2022. The event was organised by World Bowls and the International Indoor Bowls Council (IIBC).

The Championships are the inaugural edition because two attempts at holding the event in 2020 and 2021 were cancelled due to the COVID-19 pandemic. In 2019, World Bowls came to an agreement with the IIBC (formerly the WIBC). The agreement was to merge their two international indoor championships, the World Cup Singles and the IIBC Championships. The Championships were streamed live by the English Indoor Bowling Association's platform EIBA TV.

The format of the Championships is one player representing each county in the singles and two in the pairs. A round robin will end with the top two in the singles progressing to the knock out rounds but only the group winner in the pairs progressing to the knock out round.

Scottish bowlers dominated the first Championships, with Michael Stepney defeating fellow Scot Stewart Anderson in the men's singles final and Julie Forrest claiming the women's singles final after beating Gloria Ha.

Stewart Anderson and Alison Merrien MBE won the mixed pairs defeating Michael Stepney and Claire Anderson in the final.

== Winners ==
Event	Winner
Men's singles	(Scotland) Michael Stepney
Women's singles	(Scotland) Julie Forrest
Mixed pairs	(Scotland) Stewart Anderson & (Guernsey) Alison Merrien MBE

== Results ==
=== Men's singles ===
First round

Pool 1
Pos	Name	W	D	L	Pts
1	(Scotland) Stewart Anderson	3	3	0	9
2	(Hong Kong) Arthur Lam	3	2	1	6
3	(Botswana) Remmy Kebapestse	3	1	2	3
4	(Hungary) Zoltan Pavelka	3	0	3	0

Pool 2
Pos	Name	W	D	L	Pts
1	(Guernsey) Ian Merrien	3	3	0	9
2	(Thailand) Wattana Kadkhunthod	3	2	1	6
3	(Australia) Robert Briglia	3	1	2	3
4	(Jamaica) Robert Simpson	3	0	3	0

Pool 3
Pos	Name	W	D	L	Pts
1	(Wales) Robert Chisholm	3	3	0	9
2	(Isle of Man) Mark McGreal	3	2	1	6
3	(Pakistan) Mohammed Qureshi	3	1	2	3
4	(Kenya) Benson Wambugu	3	0	0	3

Pool 4
Pos	Name	W	D	L	Pts
1	(South Africa) Jason Evans	3	3	0	9
2	(Singapore) Zoher Motiwalla	3	2	1	6
3	(Jersey) Alexander Stewart	3	1	2	3
4	(Sweden) Olle Backgren	3	0	3	0

Pool 5
Pos	Name	W	D	L	Pts
1	(England) David Bolt	3	3	0	9
2	(Scotland) Michael Stepney	3	2	1	6
3	(Spain) Graham Cathcart	3	1	2	3
4	(Namibia) Ronan Olivier	3	0	3	0

Pool 6
Pos	Name	W	D	L	Pts
1	Gary Kelly	3	3	0	9
2	(Malaysia) Fairus Jabal	3	2	1	6
3	Cecil Alexander	3	1	2	3
4	(Netherlands) Henk Veenstra	3	0	3	0

Pool 7
Pos	Name	W	D	L	Pts
1	(England) Andrew Walters	3	3	0	9
2	(Israel) Selwyn Hare	3	2	1	6
3	(United States) Bill Brault	3	1	2	3
4	(Turkey) Ozkan Akar	3	0	3	0

Pool 8
Pos	Name	W	D	L	Pts
1	(Canada) Hiren Bhartu	3	3	0	9
2	Andrew Duncan	3	2	1	6
3	(Switzerland) Tom Schneiter	3	1	2	3
4	(Sri Lanka) Susil Don-Ramanayake	3	0	3	0

Second round

Player 1	Player 2	Score
Anderson	Kadkunthod	7–13 10–5 1–0
Chisholm	Motiwalla	12–6 10–7
Bolt	Jabal	8–7 7–3
Walters	Duncan	8–8 9–6
Merrien	Lam	6–6 10–2
Evans	McGreal	11–10 5–9 1–0
Kelly	Stepney	3–14 4–8
Barthu	Hare	11–3 10–5

Quarter finals

Player 1	Player 2	Score
Anderson	Chisholm	12–6 12–4
Bolt	Walters	10–7 4–7 0–1
Merrien	Evans	9–9 5–7
Stepney	Barthu	9–3 10–10

Semi finals

Player 1	Player 2	Score
Anderson	Walters	7–11 5–4 1–0
Evans	Stepney	3–9 1–11

Final

Player 1	Player 2	Score
Anderson	Stepney	5–10 12–5 0–0

=== Women's singles ===
First round

Pool 1
Pos	Name	W	D	L	Pts
1	Sandra Bailie	3	3	0	9
2	(Namibia) Marietjie Van den Bergh	3	2	1	6
3	(Canada) Bobbi Charlton	3	1	2	3
4	(Jamaica) Maureen Caesar	3	0	3	0

Pool 2
Pos	Name	W	D	L	Pts
1	(Wales) Amy Williams	3	3	0	9
2	(Jersey) Megan Kivlin	3	2	1	6
3	(Botswana) Marea Modutlwa	3	1	2	3
4	(Australia) Genevieve Delves	3	0	3	0

Pool 3
Pos	Name	W	D	L	Pts
1	(Wales) Kerry Packwood	3	3	0	9
2	(England) Devon Cooper	3	2	1	6
3	(Israel) Ruthie Gilor	3	1	2	3
4	(Singapore) May Lee	3	0	3	0

Pool 4
Pos	Name	W	D	L	Pts
1	(England) Ruby Hill	3	2	1	6
2	(Netherlands) Saskia Schaft	3	2	1	6
3	(Isle of Man) Janice Pilling	3	1	2	3
4	(Thailand) Tanida Kachanthornpak	3	1	2	3

Pool 5
Pos	Name	W	D	L	Pts
1	(Hong Kong) Gloria Ha	3	2	1	6
2	(South Africa) Colleen Piketh	3	2	1	6
3	(Guernsey) Rose Ogier	3	2	1	6
4	Daphne Arthur-Almond	3	0	3	0

Pool 6
Pos	Name	W	D	L	Pts
1	(Scotland) Claire Anderson	3	3	0	9
2	Lara Reaney	3	2	1	6
3	(Isle of Man) Paula Garrett	3	1	2	3
4	(Sri Lanka) Arosha Jayasundara	3	0	3	0

Pool 7
Pos	Name	W	D	L	Pts
1	(Malaysia) Alyani Jamil	3	3	0	9
2	(Scotland) Julie Forrest	3	2	1	6
3	(Spain) Carol Broomfield	3	1	2	3
4	(Kenya) Sophy Kihuyu	3	0	3	0

Pool 8
Pos	Name	W	D	L	Pts
1	(United States) Anne Nunes	3	3	0	9
2	(Guernsey) Alison Merrien MBE	3	2	1	6
3	(Switzerland) Marianne Kuenzle	3	1	2	3
4	(Turkey) Rahsan Akar	3	0	3	0

Second round

Player 1	Player 2	Score
Bailie	Kilvin	13–4 4–8 1–0
Packwood	Schaft	12–1 10–3
Ha	Reaney	9–4 6–9 1–0
Jamal	Merrien MBE	2–11 5–7
Williams	Van Den Bergh	12–5 7–7
Hill	Cooper	5–8 14–6 0–1
Anderson	Piketh	8–7 5–8 1–0
Nunes	Forrest	0–13 3–9

Quarter finals

Player 1	Player 2	Score
Bailie	Packwood	7–6 7–7
Merrien MBE	Ha	10–0 7–8 0–1
Cooper	Williams	9–3 1–12 0–1
Forrest	Anderson	9–4 5–8 1–0

Semi finals

Player 1	Player 2	Score
Bailie	Ha	3–10 5–10
Williams	Forrest	4–9 7–8

Final

Player 1	Player 2	Score
Forrest	Ha	9–4 10–2

=== Mixed pairs ===
First round

Pool 1
Pos	Name	W	D	L	Pts
1	Kelly & Reaney	3	3	0	9
2	(Isle of Man) McGreal & Garrett	3	2	1	6
3	(Turkey) Akar & Akar	3	1	2	3
4	(Israel) Hare & Gilor	3	0	3	0

Pool 2
Pos	Name	W	D	L	Pts
1	(Guernsey) Merrien & Ogier	3	2	1	6
2	(Sweden) Backgren & (Wales) Williams	3	2	1	6
3	(Malaysia) Jabal & Jamil	3	1	2	3
4	(Botswana) Kebapetse & Modutlwa	3	1	2	3

Pool 3
Pos	Name	W	D	L	Pts
1	(Scotland) Anderson & (Guernsey) Merrien MBE	3	3	0	9
2	(Pakistan) Qureshi & (Scotland) Forrest	3	1	2	3
3	(Singapore) Motiwalla & Lee	3	1	2	3
4	(Australia) Briglia & Delves	3	1	2	3

Pool 4
Pos	Name	W	D	L	Pts
1	(England) Walters & Hill	3	3	0	9
2	(Thailand) Kadkhunthod & Kachanthornpak	3	2	1	6
3	Alexander & Arthur-Almond	3	1	2	3
4	(Namibia) Olivier & Van den Bergh	3	0	3	0

Pool 5
Pos	Name	W	D	L	Pts
1	(Wales) Chisholm & Packwood	3	3	0	9
2	(United States) Brault & Nunes	3	2	1	6
3	(Hungary) Pavelka & (England) Cooper	3	1	2	3
4	(Sri Lanka) Don-Ramanayake & Jayasundara	3	0	3	0

Pool 6
Pos	Name	W	D	L	Pts
1	(Scotland) Stepney & Anderson	3	3	0	9
2	(Hong Kong) Lam & Ha	3	2	1	6
3	(Switzerland) Schneiter & Kuenzle	3	1	2	3
4	(Jamaica) Simpson & Caesar	3	0	3	0

Pool 7
Pos	Name	W	D	L	Pts
1	Duncan & Bailie	3	3	0	9
2	(Netherlands) Veenstra & Schaft	3	2	1	6
3	(Jersey) Stewart & Kivlin	3	1	2	3
4	(Kenya) Wambugu & Kihuyu	3	0	3	0

Pool 8
Pos	Name	W	D	L	Pts
1	(South Africa) Evans & Piketh	3	3	0	9
2	(Canada) Bhartu & Charlton	3	2	1	6
3	(Spain) Cathcart & Broomfield	3	1	2	3
4	(England) Bolt & (Isle of Man) Pilling	3	0	3	0

Quarter finals

Player 1	Player 2	Score
Kelly & Reaney	Merrien & Ogier	11–4 12–7
Anderson & Merrien MBE	Walters & Hill	8–6 5–14 1–0
Chisholm & Packwood	Stepney & Anderson	6–11 7–15
Duncan & Bailie	Evans & Piketh	10–7 6–7 0–1

Semi finals

Player 1	Player 2	Score
Stepney & Anderson	Evans & Piketh	5–8 8–6 1–0
Anderson & Merrien MBE	Kelly & Reaney	10–1 14–3

Final

Player 1	Player 2	Score
Anderson & Merrien MBE	Stepney & Anderson	7–9 8–6 1–0
