= 2024 World Bowls Indoor Championships =

Indoor Bowls Championship

- 3rd
- Location: Guernsey Indoor Bowling Association, Channel Islands
- Date: 21–27 April 2024

The 2024 World Bowls Indoor Championships took place at the Guernsey Indoor Bowling Association in the Channel Islands from 21 to 27 April 2024. The event was organised by World Bowls and the International Indoor Bowls Council (IIBC).

The format of the Championships is one player representing each county in the singles and two in the pairs. A round robin determines the top player/team in each section progressing to the quarter finals and the second place player/team progressing to the knockout round. One second place team was also drawn out of the hat to progress to the quarter final.

Jason Greenslade representing Guernsey after switching from Wales, won the men's singles event.

== Winners ==
Event	Winner
Men's singles	(Guernsey) Jason Greenslade
Women's singles	(Malaysia) Nor Farah Ain Abdullah
Mixed pairs	(Australia) Ray Pearse & (Australia) Samantha Atkinson

== Results ==
=== Men's singles ===
First round

Section 1
Pos	Name	Pts
1	(Australia) Ray Pearse	15
2	Simon Martin	9
3	(Turkey) Ozkan Akar	9
4	(United States) Loren Dion	6
5	(Hong Kong) Stanley Gon Lap Lai	6
6	(Jamaica) Robert Simpson	0

Section 2
Pos	Name	Pts
1	(Malaysia) Izzat Dzulkeple	12
2	(Spain) Peter Bonsor	12
3	(Jersey) Derek Boswell	9
4	(Malta) Joe Saragozza	6
5	(Norfolk Island) Jordy Jones	3
6	(Singapore) Chiu Pok Man	3

Section 3
Pos	Name	Pts
1	(Wales) Jason Greenslade	15
2	(Scotland) Michael Stepney	12
3	(Namibia) Carel Aron Olivier	9
4	(Switzerland) Beat Matti	6
5	(Sweden) Olle Backgren	3
6	(France) Guillaume Hertzog	0

Section 4
Pos	Name	Pts
1	(New Zealand) Shannon McIlroy	12
2	(Isle of Man) Clive McGreal	9
3	(Wales) Kristian Crocker	6
4	(Japan) Hisaharu Satoh	3
5	(Hungary) Gabor Foti	0

Section 5
Pos	Name	Pts
1	(England) Harry Goodwin	15
2	(South Africa) Jason Evans	9
3	(Macau) Johnny Ng	9
4	(Canada) Mike McNorton	9
5	(Falkland Islands) Oliver Thompson	3
6	(Botswana) Micharl Gabobewe	0

Knockout round

Player 1	Player 2	Score
Martin	Evans	8–0, 7–6
Bonsor	McGreal	5–5, 9–4

Quarter finals

Player 1	Player 2	Score
Greenslade	Bonsor	9–4, 6–6
Dzulkeple	Pearse	3–5, 8–3, 1–0
McIlroy	Stepney	5–4, 8–3, 1–0
Goodwin	Martin	10–1, 8–5

Semi finals

Player 1	Player 2	Score
Greenslade	McIlroy	5–2, 3–4, 1–0
Dzulkeple	Goodwin	5–5, 7–2

Final

Player 1	Player 2	Score
Greenslade	Dzulkeple	6–5, 9–3

=== Women's singles ===
First round

Section 1
Pos	Name	Pts
1	(Scotland) Natalie McWilliams	12
2	(Malaysia) Nor Farah Ain Abdullah	6
3	(South Africa) Esme Haley	6
4	(Spain) Lisa Bonsor	3
5	(Turkey) Rahsan Akar	3

Section 2
Pos	Name	Pts
1	(Malta) Connie Rixon	12
2	(Jersey) Lindsey Greechan	12
3	(Scotland) Julie Forrest	12
4	(Hong Kong) Gloria Yat Ting	6
5	(Japan) Keiko Kurohara	6
6	(United States) Mary Thompson	0

Section 3
Pos	Name	Pts
1	(Australia) Samantha Atkinson	9
2	(Norfolk Island) Petal Jones	9
3	(Wales) Sara Nicholls	6
4	(Singapore) Lee Beng Hua	3
5	(Israel) Irit Grencel	3

Section 4
Pos	Name	Pts
1	(New Zealand) Tayla Bruce	15
2	(Canada) Linda Ng	12
3	(Botswana) Lephai Marea Modutlwa	9
4	(France) Cindy Royet	6
5	(Macau) Pian Lai	3
6	(Jamaica) Maureen Caesar	0

Section 5
Pos	Name	Pts
1	(Guernsey) Rose Ogier	12
2	(England) Rebecca McMillian	12
3	Sandra Bailie MBE	9
4	(Switzerland) Marianne Kuenzle	9
5	(Isle of Man) Caroline Whitehead	0
6	(Namibia) Yvonne Oliver	0

Knockout round

Player 1	Player 2	Score
Ng	Greechan	7–1, 7–3
McMillan	Jones	5–4, 9–4

Quarter finals

Player 1	Player 2	Score
Abdullah	Atkinson	6–5, 9–1
Ng	Ogier	8–0, 4–3
Rixon	Bruce	7–4, 4–5, 1–0
McWilliams	McMillan	7–7, 6–6, 1–0

Semi finals

Player 1	Player 2	Score
Abdullah	Ng	8–4, 7–7
Rixon	McWilliams	1–7, 8–1, 1–0

Final

Player 1	Player 2	Score
Abdullah	Rixon	6–2, 6–3

=== Mixed pairs ===
First round

Section 1
Pos	Name	Pts
1	(Wales) Crocker & Nicholls	12
2	(Australia) Pearse & Atkinson	9
3	(Namibia) Olivier & Olivier	9
4	(Isle of Man) McGreal & Whitehead	3
5	(Switzerland) Matti & Kuenzle	0

Section 2
Pos	Name	Pts
1	(Sweden) Backgren & (Guernsey) Merrien	12
2	(Malaysia) Dzulkeple & Abdullah	12
3	(Jersey) Boswell & Greechan	9
4	(Malta) Saragozza & Rixon	6
5	(Norfolk Island) Jones & Jones	3
6	(Hungary) Foti & (Israel) Grencel	3

Section 3
Pos	Name	Pts
1	(Canada) McNorton & Ng	15
2	Martin & Bailie MBE	12
3	(Macau) Ng & Lai	9
4	(Falkland Islands) Thompson & (Scotland) McWilliams	6
5	(Botswana) Gabobewe & Modutlwa	3
6	(Jamaica) Simpson & Caesar	3

Section 4
Pos	Name	Pts
1	(New Zealand) McIlroy & Bruce	12
2	(England) Goodwin & McMillan	12
3	(Hong Kong) Lai & Ha	6
4	(United States) Dion & Thompson	6
5	(Singapore) Pok Man & Beng Hua	6
6	(France) Hertzog & Royet	3

Section 5
Pos	Name	Pts
1	(Scotland) Stepney & Forrest	15
2	(Guernsey) Greenslade & Ogier	12
3	(Spain) Bonsor & Bonsor	6
4	(Japan) Satou & Kurohara	6
5	(South Africa) Evans & Haley	6
6	(Turkey) Akar & Rahsan	3

Knockout round

Player 1	Player 2	Score
Dzulkeple & Abdullah	Martin & Bailie MBE	6–2, 11–6
Goodwin & McMillan	Greenslade & Ogier	5–8, 10–6, 1–0

Quarter finals

Player 1	Player 2	Score
Pearse & Atkinson	Stepney & Forrest	13–6, 7–7
Goodwin & McMillan	Backgren & Merrien	9–2, 8–3
Dzulkeple & Abdullah	Crocker & Nicholls	12–8, 7–4
McNorton & Ng	McIlroy & Bruce	7–6, 4–5, 1–0

Semi finals

Player 1	Player 2	Score
Pearse & Atkinson	Dzulkeple & Abdullah	9–2, 11–3
Goodwin & McMillan	McNorton & Ng	8–3, 8–3

Final

Player 1	Player 2	Score
Pearse & Atkinson	Goodwin & McMillan	9–1, 2–9, 1–0
