= 2025 World Bowls Indoor Championships =

Indoor Bowls Championship

- 4th
- Location: Aberdeen Indoor Bowling Club, Aberdeen, Scotland
- Date: 20–26 April 2025

The 2025 World Bowls Indoor Championships took place at the Aberdeen Indoor Bowling Club in Aberdeen, Scotland, from 20 to 26 April 2025.

The format of the Championships is one player representing each county in the singles and two in the pairs. In the singles, a round robin determines the top player in each section progressing to the quarter final and the second and third placed players progressing to the knockout round. The mixed pairs was slightly different in that a draw determined the knockout round, due to the fact that 12 teams qualified from the six group round robin stage.

Australia's Jack McShane won the singles defeating Dominic McVittie in the final, while Sophie McGrouther became world champion after a tie break victory over Emily Kernick. The English pair of McVittie and Kernick gained consolation by winning the mixed pairs title.

== Winners ==
Event	Winner
Men's singles	(Australia) Jack McShane
Women's singles	(Scotland) Sophie McGrouther
Mixed pairs	(England) Dominic McVittie & Emily Kernick

== Results ==
=== Men's singles ===
First round

Section 1
Pos	Name	Pts
1	Andrew Kyle	21
2	(Isle of Man) Mark McGreal	15
3	(Guernsey) Ian Merrien	15
4	(Israel) Boaz Markus	12
5	(Turkey) Ozkan Akar	6
6	(Canada) Mike McNorton	6
7	(Norfolk Island) Tim Sheridan	6
8	(Sweden) Olle Backgren	3

Section 2
Pos	Name	Pts
1	(Wales) Ross Owen	21
2	(New Zealand) Keanu Darby	18
3	(England) Dominic McVittie	15
4	(United States) Bill Brault	9
5	(Cyprus) Loukas Paraskeva	9
6	(Hungary) Gabor Foti	6
7	(Jamaica) Robert Simpson	3
8	(France) Patrick Piguet	3

Section 3
Pos	Name	Pts
1	(South Africa) Jason Evans	21
2	(Malaysia) Haiqal Azami	18
3	(Spain) Peter Bonsor	15
4	(Malta) Peter Ellul	12
5	(Jersey) Ian Hodgetts	9
6	(Falkland Islands) Oliver Thompson	6
7	(Switzerland) Beat Mattn	3
8	(Botswana) George Ngata Kieni	0

Section 4
Pos	Name	Pts
1	(Scotland) Stewart Anderson	21
2	(Australia) Jack McShane	18
3	(Hong Kong) Anthony So	15
4	(Namibia) Christol Steenkamp	9
5	(Macau) Johnny Yuk Kay Ng	9
6	(Pakistan) Mohammed Qureshi	6
7	(Japan) Takashi Ohira	6
8	(Netherlands) Jan Sinnema	0

Knockout round

Player 1	Player 2	Score
McVittie	McGreal	6–9, 8–1, 6–0
McShane	Bonsor	9–4, 7–4
Darby	Merrien	5–8, 4–9
Azami	So	1–10, 6–9

Quarter finals

Player 1	Player 2	Score
Kyle	McShane	4–5, 6–3 1–3
Owen	So	8–2, 8–4
Evans	Merrien	7–4, 3–8, 4–1
Anderson	McVittie	4–9, 3–6

Semi finals

Player 1	Player 2	Score
Owen	McVittie	2–6, 3–5
Evans	McShane	5–5, 5–6

Final

Player 1	Player 2	Score
McShane	McVittie	9–4, 7–2

=== Women's singles ===
First round

Section 1
Pos	Name	Pts
1	(Guernsey) Alison Merrien	18
2	(Scotland) Claire Anderson	12
3	(South Africa) Esme Kruger	9
4	(Malaysia) Nor Farah Ain Abdullah	9
5	(Hong Kong) Ada Lai	9
6	(Cyprus) Soledad Robertson	6
7	(Macau) Pian Yuk Ping Lai	0

Section 2
Pos	Name	Pts
1	(Australia) Kelsey Cottrell	15
2	(Malta) Connie Rixon	15
3	(Jersey) Rachel Macdonald	12
4	(Turkey) Rahsan Akar	9
5	(Canada) Linda Ng	6
6	(United States) Giulia Gallo	3
7	(Namibia) Diana Viljoen	3

Section 3
Pos	Name	Pts
1	(New Zealand) Tayla Bruce	18
2	(England) Emily Kernick	15
3	(Isle of Man) Caroline Whitehead	12
4	Zoe Minish	9
5	(Switzerland) Caroline Lehmann	6
6	(France) Cindy Royet	3
7	(Jamaica) Maureen Caesar	0

Section 4
Pos	Name	Pts
1	(Malaysia) Emma Firyana Saroji	15
2	(Scotland) Sophie McGrouther	15
3	(Wales) Lauren Gowen	12
4	(Norfolk Island) Shae Wilson	12
5	(Spain) Lisa Bonsor	6
6	(Japan) Sayuri Abiru	3
7	(Botswana) Auleria Shieunda Fuller	0

Knockout round

Player 1	Player 2	Score
Anderson	Macdonald	9–1, 4–9, 6–0
McGrouther	Whitehead	9–5, 14–0
Rixon	Kruger	4–9, 7–2, 1–2
Kernick	Gowen	5–4, 3–5, 2–1

Quarter finals

Player 1	Player 2	Score
Merrien	McGrouther	6–4, 1–9, 0–4
Cottrell	Kernick	4–5, 5–7
Bruce	Anderson	7–1, 3–6, 4–0
Saroji	Kruger	7–4, 8–1

Semi finals

Player 1	Player 2	Score
Saroji	Kernick	1–6, 1–9
Bruce	McGrouther	5–4, 4–6, 1–2

Final

Player 1	Player 2	Score
McGrouther	Kernick	4–6, 5–4, 6–0

=== Mixed pairs ===
First round

Section 1
Pos	Name	Pts
1	(England) McVittie & Kernick	12
2	Kyle & Minish	9
3	(Macau) Lai & Ng	6
4	(Jersey) Hodgetts & Macdonald	3
5	(Japan) Abiru & Ohira	0

Section 2
Pos	Name	Pts
1	(Israel) Markus & (Scotland) Kim Watt	12
2	(Netherlands) Sinnema & (Scotland) Ariana Mowat	9
3	(France) Piguet & Royet	6
4	(Namibia) Steenkamp & Viljoen	3
5	(Botswana) Kieni & Fuller	0

Section 3
Pos	Name	Pts
1	(Wales) Owen & Gowen	12
2	(New Zealand) Darby & Bruce	9
3	(Hong Kong) So & Lai	6
4	(Spain) Bonsor & Bonsor	3
5	(Isle of Man) McGreal & Whitehead	0

Section 4
Pos	Name	Pts
1	(Scotland) Anderson & Anderson	12
2	(South Africa) Evans & Kruger	9
3	(Hungary) Foti & (Scotland) Katie Rendall	6
4	(Jamaica) Simpson & Caesar	3
5	(Switzerland) Matti & Lehmann	0

Section 5
Pos	Name	Pts
1	(Australia) McShane & Cottrell	12
2	(Guernsey) Merrien & Merrien	12
3	(Norfolk Island) Sheridan & Wilson	9
4	(Malta) Ellul & Rixon	6
5	(Sweden) Backgren & (Malaysia) Abdullah	3
6	(Pakistan) Qureshi & (Scotland) Lauren Roddie	3

Section 6
Pos	Name	Pts
1	(Cyprus) Paraskeva & Robertson	12
2	(Malaysia) Azami & Saroji	12
3	(Turkey) Akar & Akar	9
4	(Falkland Islands) Thompson & (Scotland) McGrouther	6
5	(Canada) McNorton & Ng	3
6	(United States) Brault & Gallo	3

Knockout round

Player 1	Player 2	Score
Anderson & Anderson	Sinneman & Mowat	11–6, 11–5
Kyle & Minish	Evans & Kruger	7–7, 9–5
Merrien & Merrien	Darby & Bruce	5–6, 14–2, 5–3
McShane & Cottrell	Azami & Saroji	9–1, 7–5

Quarter finals

Player 1	Player 2	Score
McVittie & Kernick	McShane & Cottrell	9–2, 7–5
Merrien & Merrien	Markus & Watt	8–1, 9–3
Owen & Gowen	Kyle & Minish	8–3, 4–3
Anderson & Anderson	Paraskeva & Robertson	8–6, 16–2

Semi finals

Player 1	Player 2	Score
McVittie & Kernick	Anderson & Anderson	2–7, 6–5, 3–2
Merrien & Merrien	Owen & Gowen	0–7, 3–7

Final

Player 1	Player 2	Score
McVittie & Kernick	Owen & Gowen	6–6, 6–5
