= 2025 World Indoor Bowls Championship =

World Indoor Bowls Championship

- 47th World Indoor Bowls Championship
- Location: (England) Hopton-on-Sea, Great Yarmouth, Norfolk
- Date: 10–26 January 2025
- Category: World Indoor Championships

The 2025 World Indoor Bowls Championship, sponsored by Ambassador Cruise Line, was the 2025 edition of the World Indoor Bowls Championships, held at Potters Resorts, Hopton-on-Sea, Great Yarmouth, England, from 10 to 26 January 2025.

The event was organised by the World Bowls Tour and was televised by the BBC and World Bowls Tour via its YouTube and Facebook channels.

Stewart Anderson and Katherine Rednall were defending the men's and women's singles titles, respectively. Anderson lost in the quarter-finals to David Gourlay. Rednall was defeated in the first round by eventual champion Julie Forrest in a repeat of the 2024 final.

In May 2024, World Bowls Tour announced on its Facebook page that the Open Under 25 event would not take place in 2025. A four-player invitational Masters event, featuring 2009 open singles champion Billy Jackson, and BBC commentator David Corkhill, was added to the schedule as a replacement.

Scottish pair Jason Banks and Michael Stepney won the open pairs before Banks teamed up with Beth Riva the following day to also win the mixed pairs title.

Julie Forrest won the ladies' singles title for a third time, defeating Riva in the final which went to a tiebreak.

Ian Bond became the inaugural Masters champion with a win over Billy Jackson in the final, after the pair had beaten Graham Robertson and David Corkhill respectively in the semi-finals.

Jason Banks won the open singles title for the first time, defeating 2020 champion Robert Paxton in the final. He became the first player to win the open singles, open pairs and mixed pairs in the same year at the event.

== Winners ==
Event	Winner
Open Singles	(Scotland) Jason Banks
Ladies Singles	(Scotland) Julie Forrest
Open Pairs	(Scotland) Jason Banks & Michael Stepney
Mixed Pairs	(Scotland) Jason Banks & Beth Riva
Masters	(England) Ian Bond

== Draw and results ==
=== Open singles ===
First round
1	(Scotland) Stewart Anderson	13	12
(Israel) Daniel Alonim	1	5
16	(Guernsey) Jason Greenslade	2	6	1
(England) Sam Tolchard	7	4	2
9	(England) Wayne Willgress	7	10
(Scotland) Darren Weir	6	4
8	(Scotland) David Gourlay	7	10
(Scotland) James Rippey	6	5
5	(England) Robert Paxton	8	7
(Northern Ireland) Adam McKeown	5	6
12	(Scotland) Darren Burnett	8	10
(Australia) Blake Nairn	7	1
13	(Scotland) Michael Stepney	11	8
(Hong Kong) Jordi Lo	4	7
4	(England) Les Gillett	11	11
(New Zealand) Aiden Takarua	4	1
3	(England) Jamie Walker	8	10	0
(England) Paul Hartley	10	3	2
14	(England) Mervyn King	6	8	0
(South Africa) Colleen Piketh+	7	7	2
11	(England) Nick Brett	6	7
(England) Martin Heitzman	6	8
6	(England) Mark Dawes	9	9
(Scotland) Ronnie Duncan	4	7
7	(Scotland) Jason Banks	10	8
(Malaysia) Izzat Dzulkeple	5	4
10	(Scotland) Alex Marshall	4	9	2
(England) David Bolt	6	3	0
15	(England) Greg Harlow	2	10	1
(Australia) Darren Rowland	9	3	2
2	(Scotland) Paul Foster	8	10
(England) Jamie Chestney	8	7

Second round
1	(Scotland) Anderson	7	9
(England) Tolchard	7	4
9	(England) Willgress	6	4
8	(Scotland) Gourlay	6	9
5	(England) Paxton	9	7
12	(Scotland) Burnett	5	6
13	(Scotland) Stepney	7	2
4	(England) Gillett	10	8
(England) Hartley	9	12
(South Africa) Piketh	3	3
(England) Heitzman	5	4
6	(England) Dawes	10	9
7	(Scotland) Banks	9	7
10	(Scotland) Marshall	6	6
(Australia) Rowland	5	5
2	(Scotland) Foster	11	9

Quarter-finals
1	(Scotland) Anderson	6	7
8	(Scotland) Gourlay	8	9
5	(England) Paxton	10	7
4	(England) Gillett	4	5
(England) Hartley	7	6	0
6	(England) Dawes	5	7	2
7	(Scotland) Banks	10	3	2
2	(Scotland) Foster	4	10	1

Semi-finals
8	(Scotland) Gourlay	2	10	1
5	(England) Paxton	11	5	2
6	(England) Dawes	4	7
7	(Scotland) Banks	8	8

Final
5	(England) Paxton	4	8
7	(Scotland) Banks	10	12

+Colleen Piketh replaced Gerry Baker in the first round of the open singles

=== Ladies Singles ===
First round
(England) Katherine Rednall	9	8	1
(Scotland) Julie Forrest	4	9	2
(Malaysia) Nor Farah Ain Abdullah	4	2
(England) Nicole Rogers	9	11
(England) Lucy Smith	5	3
(England) Chelsea Spencer	9	11
(Scotland) Beth Riva	8	7
(South Africa) Colleen Piketh	2	5

Semi-finals
(Scotland) Forrest	3	7	2
(England) Rogers	8	5	1
(England) Spencer	9	7	0
(Scotland) Riva	10	2	2

Final
(Scotland) Forrest	11	8	2
(Scotland) Riva	8	9	0

=== Open Pairs ===
First round
(Scotland) Stewart Anderson (Scotland) Darren Burnett
bye
(Hong Kong) Po Ting Hei (Hong Kong) Jason Choi	7	9	2
(Canada) David Llewellyn (Canada) Gary Pickering	9	6	1
(England) Mervyn King (Scotland) David Gourlay
bye
(Australia) Tamara Arnold (Australia) Wesley Neilson	2	4
(England) Trevor Taylor (Scotland) Connor Milne	12	9
(Scotland) Jason Banks (Scotland) Michael Stepney
bye
(South Africa) Christoffel Lambrechts (South Africa) Fred Botha	2	8	0
(New Zealand) Anthony Oullet (New Zealand) Chris Smith	10	7	2
(England) Les Gillett (England) Wayne Willgress
bye
(England) Chris Rodgers (England) Steve Wade	6	12	0
(United States) Anne Nunes (United States) Bill Brault	7	4	2
(England) Mark Dawes (England) Jamie Walker
bye
(Israel) Amnon Amar (Israel) Itai Rigbi	2	2
(Scotland) Kieran Ward (Scotland) Mark Renwick	18	11
(England) Robert Paxton (Guernsey) Jason Greenslade
bye
(Thailand) Frank De Vries (Thailand) Darren Chatwin	10	9
(Scotland) Stuart Pagan (Scotland) Paul D Brown	7	4
(England) Nick Brett (England) Greg Harlow
bye
(Australia) Blake Nairn (Australia) Sean Mawdsley	2	4
(Wales) Daniel Salmon (Wales) Damian Doubler	7	8
(Scotland) Paul Foster (Scotland) Alex Marshall
bye
(England) Jack Butcher (Scotland) James Rippey	4	3
(Republic of Ireland) Matthew Crawford (Republic of Ireland) Mark Foster	8	10

Second round
(Scotland) Anderson (Scotland) Burnett	7	13	0
(Hong Kong) Hei (Hong Kong) Choi	8	2	2
(England) King (Scotland) Gourlay	7	4	2
(England) Taylor (Scotland) Milne	5	7	0
(Scotland) Banks (Scotland) Stepney	14	7
(New Zealand) Oullet (New Zealand) Smith	0	7
(England) Gillett (England) Willgress	10	11
(United States) Nunes (United States) Brault	4	3
(England) Dawes (England) Walker	11	13
(Scotland) Ward (Scotland) Renwick	2	0
(England) Paxton (Guernsey) Greenslade	7	10
(Thailand) De Vries (Thailand) Chatwin	5	2
(England) Harlow (England) Brett	4	5
(Wales) Salmon (Wales) Doubler	10	6
(Scotland) Foster (Scotland) Marshall	8	9	1
(Republic of Ireland) Crawford (Republic of Ireland) Foster	1	10	2

Quarter-finals
(Hong Kong) Hei (Hong Kong) Choi	1	9	0
(England) King (Scotland) Gourlay	10	4	2
(Scotland) Banks (Scotland) Stepney	8	10
(England) Gillett (England) Willgress	3	4
(England) Dawes (England) Walker	4	5
(England) Paxton (Guernsey) Greenslade	9	6
(Wales) Salmon (Wales) Doubler	5	6	2
(Republic of Ireland) Crawford (Republic of Ireland) Foster	6	5	1

Semi-finals
(England) King (Scotland) Gourlay	2	11	1
(Scotland) Banks (Scotland) Stepney	8	9	2
(England) Paxton (Guernsey) Greenslade	11	5
(Wales) Salmon (Wales) Doubler	7	5

Final
(Scotland) Banks (Scotland) Stepney	10	6	2
(England) Paxton (Guernsey) Greenslade	9	8	0

=== Mixed Pairs ===
First Round
(England) Nick Brett (Scotland) Julie Forrest	4	4
(Scotland) Paul Foster (England) Katherine Rednall	9	6
(Scotland) Stewart Anderson (Malaysia) Nor Farah Ain Abdullah	7	7
(England) Jamie Walker (South Africa) Colleen Piketh	7	6
(England) Robert Paxton (England) Lucy Smith	4	5
(Scotland) Jason Banks (Scotland) Beth Riva	9	6
(England) Mark Dawes (England) Chelsea Spencer	6	3
(England) Les Gillett (England) Nicole Rogers	9	9

Semi-finals
(Scotland) Foster (England) Rednall	10	6
(Scotland) Anderson (Malaysia) Abdullah	3	6
(Scotland) Banks (Scotland) Riva	8	11
(England) Gillett (England) Rogers	6	1

Final
(Scotland) Foster (England) Rednall	5	10
(Scotland) Banks (Scotland) Riva	12	10

=== Masters ===
Semi-finals
(England) Billy Jackson	9	3	2
(Northern Ireland) David Corkill	7	12	1
(Scotland) Graham Robertson	4	3
(England) Ian Bond	9	8

Final
(England) Jackson	7	6
(England) Bond	7	7

== Controversy ==
In January 2025, the World Bowls Tour (WBT) became the subject of significant controversy over the participation of Israeli athletes in the World Indoor Bowls Championships. Initially, the WBT announced the exclusion of Israeli players, citing security concerns following protests at previous events. The organisers banned Israeli players Daniel Alomin, Amnon Amar and Itai Rigbi from competing, citing "significant escalation in related political concerns". The move created a significant reaction, with MP Rupert Lowe stating "Sport should be a unifier, and it should be above politics".

The decision drew widespread criticism, with Jewish organisations and local parliamentarians condemning it as discriminatory. Following public backlash, the WBT reversed its decision on 31 December 2024, allowing Israeli athletes to compete. The organisation implemented additional security measures to address concerns and ensure the safety of all participants.
