= Lauren Gowen =

Welsh bowls player (born 2004)

Personal information
- Nationality: British (Welsh)
- Born: 2003 (age 22–23) Penygraig, Wales

Sport
- Sport: indoor and lawn bowls
- Club: Newport (indoors) / Cardiff BC (outdoor)

Achievements and titles
- Highest world ranking: 15 (July 2025)
Medal record
World Bowls Indoor Championships
Silver medal – second place	2025 Aberdeen	mixed pairs
European Championships
Bronze medal – third place	2024 Ayr	fours
British Bowls Championships
Gold medal – first place	2025 Llandrindod Wells	pairs

Lauren Marie Gowen (born 2003) is a Welsh international lawn & indoor bowler, who won a silver medal at the 2025 World Bowls Indoor Championships and is a Welsh national champion and has been capped by Wales. She reached a career high ranking of world number 15 in June 2024.

== Bowls career ==
Gowen came to prominence aged just 10-years-old, when she made history for Wales becoming the youngest bowler ever to play for Wales in the British Under-25s Championship.

In 2024, Gowen reached the quarter-finals at the World Bowls Junior Indoor Championship and won a bronze medal in the fours at the 2024 European Bowls Championships.

In 2024, Gowen won the national U25 indoor singles title and the 2025 British Isles U25 title. Subsequently in 2025, Gowen paired with Ross Owen, won the silver medal in the mixed pairs event at the 2025 World Bowls Indoor Championships in Aberdeen.

Further success arrived when she won the pairs at the 2025 British Championships. She represented Wales at the women's pairs with Amy Williams at the 2026 Commonwealth Games and reached the semi finals.
