= Beth Riva =

Scottish lawn and indoor bowler (born 2003)

Personal information
- Nationality: British (Scottish)
- Born: 2003

Sport
- Sport: Indoor and lawn Bowls

Achievements and titles
- Highest world ranking: 27 (March 2025)
Medal record
Representing Scotland
Women's Bowls
World Indoor Championships
Gold medal – first place	2025 Yarmouth	mixed pairs
Silver medal – second place	2025 Yarmouth	singles

Beth Riva (born 2003) is a Scottish bowls player who won the World Championship mixed pairs in 2025. She reached a career high ranking of world number 27 in March 2025.

== Bowls career ==
In 2022 after being capped as an under-25 Scottish International, Riva was chosen by Team Scotland's Achieve programme to travel to the 2022 Commonwealth Games as part of the Team Scotland experience.

Riva teamed up with Jason Banks to win the 2025 World Indoor Bowls Championship mixed pairs title. In the first round the pair defeated Robert Paxton and Lucy Smith in straight sets before winning their semi-final match against Les Gillett and Nicole Rogers again in straight sets. Riva and Banks then won the final against tournament favourites Paul Foster and Katherine Rednall without dropping a set. Riva was studying law at Edinburgh Napier University at the time. She was also runner-up in the ladies' singles, defeating Chelsea Spencer in the semifinals, before losing the final to Julie Forrest.

== Family ==
Her uncle is six-times world indoor singles champion Alex Marshall.
