= World lawn and indoor bowls events =

World lawn bowls list and schedule of events

These are the premier International Bowls Events between national bowls organisations affiliated to World Bowls, the PBA, World Bowls Tour and the IIBC.

== Calendar ==
=== Outdoor ===
Event	Venue	Next edition
World Championships	(England) Leamington Spa	July 2027
World Singles Champion of Champions	(Australia) Barham, NSW	6–10 October 2026
World Cup	Hong Kong, China	November 2026
European Bowls Championships	tbc	tba 2026
17th Asian Lawn Bowls Championship	(India) New Delhi	2026
Southeast Asian Games	(Malaysia) Kuala Lumpur, Penang & Sarawak	tbc 2027
Hong Kong International Bowls Classic	Hong Kong	November 2026
Pacific Games	(Tonga) Nuku'alofa	tbc 2031

=== Indoor ===
Event	Venue	Next edition
World Bowls Indoor Championships	tbc	tbc 2026
Scottish International Open	(Scotland) West Lothian IBC, Livingston	21-23 October 2025
World Indoor Bowls Championships	(England) Yarmouth	9-25 January 2026
World Bowls Junior Indoor Championship	(Northern Ireland) Ballyclare	1–4 December 2025
Commonwealth Games	(Scotland) Glasgow	24 July – 2 August 2026

== World Outdoor Bowls Championships ==
The sport's premier event and organised by World Bowls. First held in 1966, the World Outdoor Bowls Championships for men and women are held every 4 years. From 2008 the men's and women's events are held together. Qualifying national bowls organisations (usually countries) are represented by a team of 5 players, who play once as a single and a four, then again as a pair and a triple. Gold, silver, and bronze medals are awarded in each of the 4 disciplines, and there is also a trophy for the best overall team — the Leonard Trophy for men and the Taylor Trophy for women.

== Commonwealth Games ==
Organised by the Commonwealth Games Federation. First held in 1930, the Commonwealth Games Bowls Championships for men and women are held every 4 years. Women's events were added from 1982. Four gold medals are competed for in the singles, pairs, triples and fours.

== World Indoor Bowls Championships ==
One of two World Championship indoor events. Organised by the PBA/World Bowls Tour. First held in 1979, the World Indoor Bowls Championships for men and women are held every year. There are currently five events, the open singles, the open pairs, the women's singles, the mixed pairs and open under-25 singles. It is currently organised by the Professional Bowls Association and the World Bowls Tour and involves mainly Northern Hemisphere nations.

== World Bowls Indoor Championship ==
One of two World Championship indoor events. Organised jointly by World Bowls and the IIBC. A new event starting in 2022 (a merger of the former World Cup Singles and IIBC championships. Rival competition to the PBA and WBT event listed above.

== World Singles Champion of Champions ==
Organised by World Bowls. A leading outdoor event held annually between the winners of the respective National Championships.

== Pacific Games ==
Organised by Pacific Games Council. A leading outdoor event held every four years between the Pacific Islands nations as part of the Pacific Games.

== Southeast Asian Games ==
Organised by Southeast Asian Games Federation. A leading outdoor event held every two years between the Southeast Asian nations as part of the Southeast Asian Games.

== Asian Lawn Bowls Championship ==
Organised by World Bowls. A leading outdoor event held annually between the Asian nations.

== European Bowls Championships ==
Organised by Bowls Europe Ltd. A leading outdoor event held annually between European nations.

== Other leading events ==
- Hong Kong International Bowls Classic (outdoors)
- Asia Pacific Bowls Championships (outdoors/defunct)
- Atlantic Bowls Championships (outdoors/defunct)
- World Cup Singles (indoors/defunct)
- Scottish International Open (indoors)
- World Bowls Junior Indoor Championship (indoors)
