= The Greechans =

The Greechans are a family of bowls players from Jersey. Both Lindsey Greechan and Thomas Greechan, compete both indoor and outdoor, as does their daughter Chloe Greechan and son Taylor Greechan. Thomas, Lindsey and Helen (Thomas' late mother) are all British champions while Thomas, Lindsey and Chloe have all won the IIBC Championships on at least one occasion each. Lindsey, Thomas and Helen have also represented Jersey at the Commonwealth Games.

== Bowls Profiles ==
=== Helen Greechan ===
Helen Greechan
Personal information
- Nationality: British (Jersey)
- Died: 28 December 2020

Sport
- Club: Jersey BC
Medal record
British Isles Championships
Gold medal – first place	2014	pairs

Helen Russell Greechan represented Jersey in the women's triples at the 2010 Commonwealth Games and has won the 2014 pairs title at the British Isles Women's Bowls Championships.

== Titles and finals ==
	Championship	Event	Year	Result	Ref
Lindsey; Greechan	IIBC Championships (WIBC)	Ladies U25 Singles	2002	Won	
Lindsey; Greechan	IIBC Championships (WIBC)	Ladies U25 Singles	2004, 2006	Runner-up	
Lindsey; Greechan	IIBC Championships (WIBC)	U25 Mixed Pairs	2004, 2005	Runner-up	
Lindsey; Greechan	IIBC Championships (WIBC)	Ladies Singles	2014	Runner-up	
Lindsey; Greechan	Atlantic Rim Games	Women's Fours	2007	Won	
Lindsey; Greechan	British Isles Bowls Championships	Ladies Singles	2008	Won	
Lindsey; Greechan	British Isles Bowls Championships	Ladies Singles	2013	Runner-up	
Lindsey; Greechan	British Isles Bowls Championships	Ladies Triples	2011	Runner-up	
Lindsey; Greechan	British Isles Bowls Championships	Ladies Triples	2013	Won	
Lindsey; Greechan	British Isles Indoor Championships (BIWIBC)	Ladies U25 Singles	2003, 2004	Runner-up	
Lindsey; Greechan	British Isles Indoor Championships (BIWIBC)	Ladies Pairs	2011	Runner-up	
Lindsey; Greechan	British Isles Indoor Championships (BIWIBC)	Ladies Fours	2014	Runner-up	
Lindsey; Greechan	Channel Islands Outdoor Championships	Ladies Singles	2007	Won	
Lindsey; Greechan	Channel Islands Outdoor Championships	Ladies Triples	2009, 2010, 2012, 2015	Won	
Lindsey; Greechan	Channel Islands Outdoor Championships	Open U35 Singles	2004	Won	
Lindsey; Greechan	Channel Islands Outdoor Championships	Mixed Pairs	2004, 2005	Won	
Lindsey; Greechan	Channel Islands Outdoor Championships	Open Pairs	2004	Won	
Lindsey; Greechan	Channel Islands Outdoor Championships	Open Fours	2004	Won	
Lindsey; Greechan	Channel Islands Indoor Championships	Ladies U25 Singles	2004, 2006	Won	
Lindsey; Greechan	Channel Islands Indoor Championships	Ladies U25 Singles	2005	Runner-up	
Lindsey; Greechan	Channel Islands Indoor Championships	Ladies Triples	2005	Won	
Lindsey; Greechan	Channel Islands Indoor Championships	Ladies Triples	2004, 2006, 2007	Runner-up	
Lindsey; Greechan	Channel Islands Indoor Championships	Ladies Fours	2004, 2005, 2006, 2007	Runner-up	
Lindsey; Greechan	Channel Islands Indoor Championships	Ladies Pairs	2007	Runner-up	
Lindsey; Greechan	Jersey Outdoor Championships (BJA)	Ladies Sets Singles	2005, 2006, 2008	Won	
Lindsey; Greechan	Jersey Outdoor Championships (BJA)	Ladies Singles	2007, 2008, 2012, 2013	Won	
Lindsey; Greechan	Jersey Outdoor Championships (BJA)	Ladies Pairs	2008	Won	
Lindsey; Greechan	Jersey Outdoor Championships (BJA)	Ladies Triples	2009, 2010, 2012, 2015	Won	
Lindsey; Greechan	Jersey Outdoor Championships (BJA)	Ladies Champion of Champions	2014	Won	
Lindsey; Greechan	Jersey Indoor Championships (JIBA)	Ladies Singles	2005, 2008, 2013	Runner-up	
Lindsey; Greechan	Jersey Indoor Championships (JIBA)	Ladies Triples	2005, 2006	Won	
Lindsey; Greechan	Jersey Indoor Championships (JIBA)	Ladies Fours	2002, 2003, 2004, 2005	Won	
Thomas; Greechan	World Champion of Champions (WB)	Men's Singles	2011	Won	
Thomas; Greechan	Atlantic Rim Games	Men's Fours	2007	Runner-up	
Thomas; Greechan	British Isles Indoor Championships (BIIBC)	Men's Fours	2010, 2012	Won	
Thomas; Greechan	Channel Islands Outdoor Championships	Men's Singles	1999, 2007	Won	
Thomas; Greechan	Channel Islands Outdoor Championships	Men's Pairs	2000, 2002	Won	
Thomas; Greechan	Channel Islands Outdoor Championships	Men's U25 Singles	2000	Won	
Thomas; Greechan	Channel Islands Outdoor Championships	Men's Fours	2002, 2004, 2010, 2014	Won	
Thomas; Greechan	Channel Islands Outdoor Championships	Men's Triples	2005	Won	
Thomas; Greechan	Channel Islands Indoor Championships	Men's Pairs	2004	Runner-up	
Thomas; Greechan	Channel Islands Indoor Championships	Men's Triples	2006	Won	
Thomas; Greechan	Channel Islands Indoor Championships	Men's Triples	2004	Runner-up	
Thomas; Greechan	Channel Islands Indoor Championships	Men's Fours	2004, 2006	Won	
Thomas; Greechan	Jersey Outdoor Championships (BJA)	U25 Men's Singles	1996, 1998, 2000, 2001	Won	
Thomas; Greechan	Jersey Outdoor Championships (BJA)	Men's Pairs	2000, 2002	Won	
Thomas; Greechan	Jersey Outdoor Championships (BJA)	Men's Weekend Singles	2000	Won	
Thomas; Greechan	Jersey Outdoor Championships (BJA)	Men's Fours	2002, 2004, 2010, 2014	Won	
Thomas; Greechan	Jersey Outdoor Championships (BJA)	Men's Triples	2005	Won	
Thomas; Greechan	Jersey Outdoor Championships (BJA)	Men's Sets Singles	2005, 2011	Won	
Thomas; Greechan	Jersey Outdoor Championships (BJA)	Men's Singles	2007, 2008, 2010	Won	
Chloe; Greechan	IIBC Championships (WIBC)	Mixed Pairs	2016	Won	
Chloe; Greechan	Channel Islands Indoor Championships	Women's Pairs	2023	Won	
Chloe; Greechan	Channel Islands Outdoor Championships	Open Novices Singles	2015	Won	
Chloe; Greechan	Jersey Outdoor Championships (BJA)	Open Pairs	2013	Won	
Chloe; Greechan	Jersey Outdoor Championships (BJA)	U18 Open Pairs	2013, 2014	Won	
Chloe; Greechan	Jersey Outdoor Championships (BJA)	Novices Singles	2015	Won	
Chloe; Greechan	Jersey Outdoor Championships (BJA)	Mixed Pairs	2015	Runners-up	
Lindsey & Thomas; Greechan	IIBC Championships (WIBC)	Mixed Pairs	2008	Runners-up |	
Lindsey & Thomas; Greechan	Channel Islands Outdoor Championships	Open Fours	2005	Runners-up	
Lindsey & Thomas; Greechan	Channel Islands Outdoor Championships	Mixed Pairs	2012	Won	
Lindsey & Thomas; Greechan	Jersey Outdoor Championships (BJA)	Mixed Pairs	2012	Won	
Lindsey & Chloe; Greechan	Jersey Outdoor Championships (BJA)	Ladies Triples	2015	Won	
Thomas & Chloe; Greechan	IIBC Championships (WIBC)	Mixed Pairs	2015	Won	
