= 2000 World Outdoor Bowls Championship – Men's singles =

World bowls event

World Outdoor Championships 2000 men's singles
- 9th World Outdoor Bowls Championships
- Location: , Johannesburg, South Africa
- Date(s): 1 April - 15 April 2000
- Category: World Bowls Championship

The 2000 Men's World Outdoor Bowls Championship men's singles was held at Marks Park Bowling Club, in Johannesburg, South Africa, from 1 to 15 April 2000.

Jeremy Henry of Ireland won the gold medal.

== Qualifying round ==
=== Section A ===
Pos	Player	P	W	L	Pts	Shots
1	Jeremy Henry	10	8	2	9	+70
2	(England) Tony Allcock	10	8	2	9	+69
3	(Zimbabwe) Richie Hayden	10	8	2	9	+50
4	(Scotland) Alex Marshall	10	6	4	7	+33
5	(South Africa) Gerry Baker	10	6	4	7	+26
6	(Malaysia) Sazali Sani	10	6	4	7	-10
7	(Zambia) Eddie Nkole	10	6	4	7	-13
8	(Fiji) Caucau Turagabeci	10	4	6	5	+20
9	(Namibia) Sandy Joubert	10	1	9	2	-72
10	(Argentina) Alberto Geddes	10	1	9	2	-79
11	(Botswana) Tony Allen	10	1	9	2	-88

=== Section B ===
Pos	Player	P	W	L	Pts	Shots
1	(Australia) Steve Glasson	11	8	3	8	+57
2	(Israel) Jeff Rabkin	11	8	3	8	+48
3	(Hong Kong) Noel Kennedy	11	8	3	8	+46
4	(New Zealand) Andrew Curtain	11	8	3	8	+40
5	(Wales) John Price	11	7	4	7	+24
6	(Norfolk Island) Barry Wilson	11	5	6	5	-23
7	(Jersey) Thomas Greechan	11	5	6	5	-26
8	(Eswatini) Derek James	11	4	7	4	-19
9	(Canada) James Covell	11	4	7	5	-26
10	(Singapore) Chai Hon Yoong	11	4	7	4	-29
11	(Guernsey) Dave Trebert	11	3	8	3	-31
12	(United States) Tom Stirratt	11	2	9	2	-61

== Finals ==
Semifinals
Henry	21
(Israel) Rabkin	13
(Australia) Glasson	21
(England) Allcock	16

Gold medal
Henry	21
(Australia) Glasson	14

== Results ==
Men's singles section A
Round 1 – 9 Apr		
Scotland	Botswana	21–8
Ireland	Fiji	21–19
Zimbabwe	Argentina	21–20
South Africa	Zambia	21–5
England	Malaysia	21–12
Round 2 – 9 Apr		
Scotland	Namibia	21–18
Zambia	Fiji	21–20
South Africa	Argentina	21–8
Zimbabwe	Ireland	21–19
Malaysia	Botswana	21–12
Round 3 – 10 Apr		
Fiji	Argentina	21–7
Zimbabwe	South Africa	21–16
England	Scotland	21–11
Zambia	Ireland	21–11
Namibia	Botswana	21–10
Round 4 – 10 Apr		
Scotland	Malaysia	21–6
Fiji	South Africa	21–10
Zimbabwe	Zambia	21–11
England	Namibia	21–2
Ireland	Argentina	21–7
Round 5 – 11 Apr		
Zimbabwe	Fiji	21–13
Zambia	Argentina	21–17
Malaysia	Namibia	21–14
Ireland	South Africa	21–7
England	Botswana	21–16
Round 6 – 11 Apr		
Fiji	Botswana	21–7
Zambia	Scotland	21–17
South Africa	Malaysia	21–10
Ireland	Namibia	21–10
England	Zimbabwe	21–17
Round 7 – 11 Apr		
Fiji	Namibia	21–16
Zambia	Botswana	21–19
South Africa	England	21–20
Ireland	Scotland	21–19
Malaysia	Argentina	21–16
Round 8 – 12 Apr		
Scotland	Fiji	21–19
Malaysia	Zambia	21–20
South Africa	Botswana	21–8
England	Argentina	21–7
Zimbabwe	Namibia	21–11
Round 9 – 13 Apr		
England	Zambia	21–13
Scotland	South Africa	21–14
Ireland	Botswana	21–4
Argentina	Namibia	21–9
Malaysia	Zimbabwe	21–17
Round 10 – 13 Apr		
Malaysia	Fiji	21–17
Zambia	Namibia	21–18
Ireland	England	21–9
Botswana	Argentina	21–13
Zimbabwe	Scotland	21–16
Round 11 – 14 Apr		
England	Fiji	21–14
South Africa	Namibia	21–14
Ireland	Malaysia	21–17
Scotland	Argentina	21–10
Zimbabwe	Botswana	21–9

Men's singles section B
Round 1 – 9 Apr		
Hong Kong	Guernsey	21–12
Israel	Australia	21–11
(Eswatini) Swaziland	Jersey	21–12
New Zealand	Wales	21–19
Canada	United States	21–18
Singapore	Norfolk Island	21–18
Round 2 – 9 Apr		
Wales	Hong Kong	21–13
New Zealand	Israel	21–13
Jersey	United States	21–7
Norfolk Island	(Eswatini) Swaziland	21–19
Australia	Guernsey	21–14
Canada	Singapore	21–9
Round 3 – 10 Apr		
Israel	Canada	21–17
New Zealand	United States	21–5
Singapore	Wales	21–14
Australia	Jersey	21–20
(Eswatini) Swaziland	Hong Kong	21–19
Norfolk Island	Guernsey	21–10
Round 4 – 10 Apr		
Israel	Jersey	21–7
New Zealand	Canada	21–16
Wales	Norfolk Island	21–16
Australia	United States	21–11
Hong Kong	Singapore	21–18
Guernsey	(Eswatini) Swaziland	21–8
Round 5 – 11 Apr		
Israel	United States	21–11
New Zealand	Singapore	21–19
Wales	Canada	21–14
Australia	(Eswatini) Swaziland	21–18
Hong Kong	Norfolk Island	21–6
Jersey	Guernsey	21–19
Round 6 – 11 Apr		
Israel	(Eswatini) Swaziland	21–18
New Zealand	Norfolk Island	21–6
Wales	United States	21–13
Australia	Canada	21–4
Hong Kong	Jersey	21–10
Singapore	Guernsey	21–16
Round 7 – 12 Apr		
Israel	Singapore	21–12
New Zealand	Jersey	21–9
Wales	(Eswatini) Swaziland	21–11
Norfolk Island	Australia	21–17
Canada	Hong Kong	21–12
United States	Guernsey	21–17
Round 8 – 13 Apr		
Hong Kong	Israel	21–17
Wales	Guernsey	21–18
Norfolk Island	United States	21–20
Australia	New Zealand	21–12
Canada	Jersey	21–15
(Eswatini) Swaziland	Singapore	21–13
Round 9 – 13 Apr		
Wales	Israel	21–11
Guernsey	New Zealand	21–20
Jersey	Norfolk Island	21–14
Hong Kong	Australia	21–16
(Eswatini) Swaziland	Canada	21–9
Singapore	United States	21–16
Round 10 – 14 Apr		
Israel	Norfolk Island	21–13
New Zealand	(Eswatini) Swaziland	21–14
Jersey	Wales	21–19
Australia	Singapore	21–8
Hong Kong	United States	21–11
Guernsey	Canada	21–13
Round 11 – 14 Apr		
Israel	Guernsey	21–9
Hong Kong	New Zealand	21–13
Jersey	Singapore	21–19
Australia	Wales	21–5
Norfolk Island	Canada	21–18
United States	(Eswatini) Swaziland	21–9
