= Mohammed Qureshi =

Pakistan bowls player

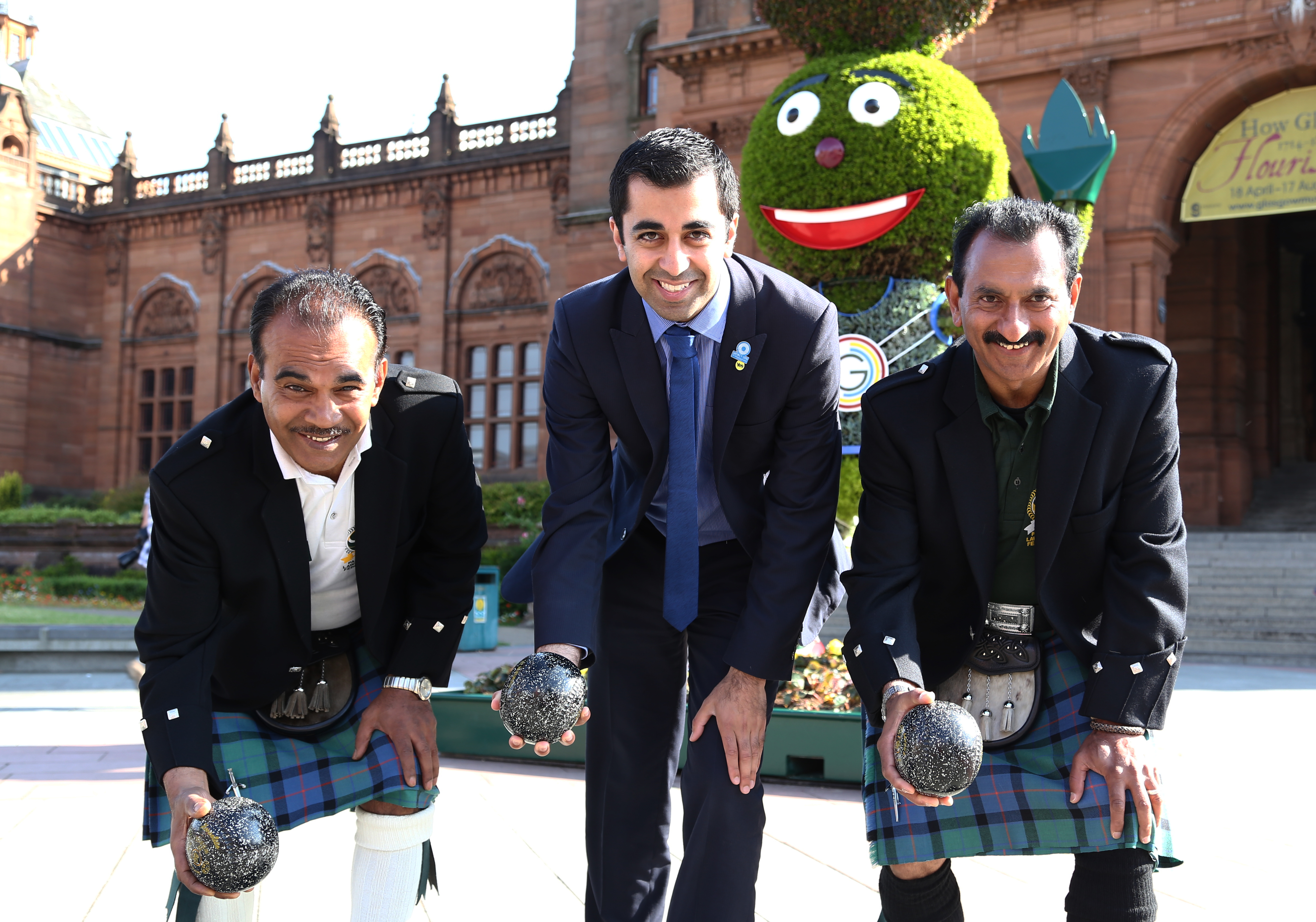
- Qureshi (left) with Scottish politician Humza Yousaf in 2014

Personal information
- Nationality: Pakistani
- Born: 20 August 1958 (age 68) Multan, Punjab, Pakistan

Sport
- Sport: Bowls

Mohammed Ayub Qureshi (born 20 August 1958), commonly known as Chico, is an international lawn and indoor bowler from Pakistan. He is based in Glasgow, Scotland, where he has lived for over 50 years and represented Pakistan at the 2014 Commonwealth Games as part of the nation's debut team in the sport. Born in Multan, Punjab, Pakistan, Qureshi balances his athletic pursuits with co-owning the Ali Shan Tandoori Restaurant alongside teammate Muzahir Ali Shan. He was introduced to lawn bowls by his bank manager and has since become a two-time club champion in Glasgow, fostering connections within the local community, including notable figures like Scottish politician Alex Salmond.

Qureshi has also competed in events like the 10th Asian Lawn Bowls Championship in 2014, contributing to Pakistan's growing presence in regional competitions, and represented Pakistan at the 2022 and 2025 World Bowls Indoor Championships. He once again represented Pakistan at the 2026 Commonwealth Games, competing in both men's singles and pairs alongside Maqsood Wasim Khan.

== Bowls career ==
Qureshi represented Pakistan at the 2014 Commonwealth Games in the Lawn bowls tournament held in Glasgow. It was the first time that Pakistan competed in bowls at the Commonwealth Games. His international breakthrough came in 2014 when he received an unexpected call-up to Pakistan's men's triples team for the Commonwealth Games in Glasgow, competing with Maqsood Khan and Muzahir Shan but failing to advance beyond the preliminary rounds after losses to teams from the Falkland Islands, Australia, England, Malaysia, and Papua New Guinea. Despite the results, his participation marked a milestone for Pakistan in lawn bowls, a sport relatively new to the country, and helped inspire greater interest domestically.

Qureshi represented Pakistan at the 10th Asian Lawn Bowls Championship in 2014, as part of the national team. The Pakistan men's team placed 9th overall, earning 6 points across all events with no advancement beyond the group stages.

In 2022, he qualified to represent Pakistan at the Inaugural World Bowls Indoor Championships. The event had been cancelled in 2020 and 2021 due to the COVID-19 pandemic. Qureshi also participated in the 2025 World Bowls Indoor Championships held at the Aberdeen Indoor Bowling Club in Scotland. Partnering with Scotland's Lauren Roddie in the mixed pairs sectional play, they suffered a 6-3, 7-4 defeat to Australia's Kelsey Cottrell and Jack McShane, resulting in elimination from contention for top placement. In the men's singles, he faced Australia's Jack McShane and lost 11-3, 15-1 in their sectional match. At the 2026 Commonwealth Games, in the singles, he secured two group-stage wins against Fiji's Arun Kumar Prasad and Jamaica's Robert Simpson, while in the pairs alongwith Maqsood Wasim Khan, he managed a drawn result against Fiji but lost to New Zealand, Australia, Northern Ireland, Tonga and the duo did not advance to the knockout rounds.

Throughout his international career in non-Commonwealth events, Qureshi has made at least two notable appearances in global and regional championships, contributing to Pakistan's efforts in both outdoor lawn bowls and indoor variants, though without securing medals or podium finishes.
