= Sophie McGrouther =

Scottish bowls player

Personal information
- Nationality: British (Scottish)
- Born: c.2003 Scotland

Sport
- Sport: Bowls
- Club: Townhill BC (outdoor) / Abbeyview IBC (indoor)

Achievements and titles
- Highest world ranking: 14 (February 2026)
Medal record
World Bowls Indoor Championships
Gold medal – first place	2025 Aberdeen	singles
British Championships
Gold medal – first place	2025 Llandrindod Wells	triples
Scottish Nationals
Gold medal – first place	2024	triples

Sophie McGrouther (born c.2003) is a Scottish international indoor bowler, who won the gold medal at the 2025 World Bowls Indoor Championships, She is also a national champion and has been capped by Scotland and reached a career high ranking of world number 14 in February 2026.

== Bowls career ==
McGrouther started bowling at the age of 10 after being introduced to the sport at school. She joined the Townhill Bowling Club and the Abbeyview Indoor Bowling Club.

In 2023 McGrouther lost to Lauren Gowen in the U25 final of the British Isles Indoor Championship singles final but won the 2024 title. McGrouther also won two consecutive Scottish U25 Singles titles in 2023 and 2024.

In 2024, McGrouther became national outdoor champion in the triples at the Scottish National Bowls Championships with Kara and Lynn Lees, which led to winning the triples at the 2025 British Championships.

She also won the national indoor singles title, which qualified her to represent Scotland at the 2025 World Bowls Indoor Championships. Subsequently in 2025, McGrouther achieved her best feat to date, winning the singles gold medal at the 2025 World Bowls Indoor Championships in Aberdeen.
