= 2026 European Bowls Championships =

European Bowls Championship

- 14th
- Location: Northfield Bowls Club, Ayr, Scotland
- Date: 3–8 September 2026
- Category: European Bowls Championships

The 2026 European Bowls Championships is the 2026 edition of the European Bowls Championships, held at Llandrindod Wells Bowls Club, Wales, from 19 to 26 September 2026. The event was organised by Bowls Europe Ltd, the corporate arm of the governing federation, Bowls Europe, and teams competed in the classic four disciplines of singles, pairs, triples and fours (rinks) events.

== Participating nations ==
The following nations entered the competition:

- Bermuda *
- Cyprus
- Czech Republic
- Falkland Islands *

- Guernsey
- Hungary
- Ireland
- Isle of Man
- Israel

- Italy
- Jersey
- Netherlands
- Portugal
- Scotland

- Spain
- Sweden
- Switzerland
- Turkey
- Wales

- Bermuda and the Falkland Islands take part in European Competition due to close cultural ties with the Home Nations.

== Medal winners ==
The following bowlers won medals at the 2026 European Bowls Championships.

- 22 September : Men's pairs and triples, women's singles and fours.
- 26 September : Men's singles and fours, women's pairs and triples.

| Event | Gold | Silver | Bronze |
|---|---|---|---|
| Men's singles | | | |
| Men's pairs | Ireland; Ryan McElroy; Mark Wilson | Spain; Darren Reynolds; Peter Bonsor | Netherlands; Frank de Vries; Ralph de Rooij |
| Men's triples | Ireland; Stuart Bennett; Stephen Kirkwood; Martin McHugh | Portugal; Geoffrey Worrall; Amar nath Nachimuthu; Joaquim da Mota Brito Cruz | Wales; Rhys Jackson; Ryan Mountstephen; Carl Wood |
| Men's fours | | | |
| Women's singles | Saskia Schaft; Netherlands | Rachel Macdonald; Jersey | Leah McCloy; Scotland |
| Women's pairs | | | |
| Women's triples | | | |
| Women's fours | Scotland; Dawn Anderson; Claire McCurdie; Sarah-Jane Ewing; Gail Notman | Jersey; Lynne Cummins; Estelle Burns; Kim Hutchings; Fiona Archibald | Wales; Jasmine Staton; Laura Daniels; Ysie White; Caroline Taylor |

== Medal table ==
After 8 events

* Host nation (Wales)

| Rank | Nation | Gold | Silver | Bronze | Total |
|---|---|---|---|---|---|
| 1 | Ireland (IRE) | 4 | 1 | 1 | 6 |
| 2 | Scotland (SCO) | 1 | 2 | 1 | 4 |
| 3 | Jersey (JEY) | 1 | 2 | 0 | 3 |
| 4 | Wales (WAL)* | 1 | 1 | 3 | 5 |
| 5 | Netherlands (NED) | 1 | 0 | 2 | 3 |
| 6 | Portugal (POR) | 0 | 1 | 0 | 1 |
| 6 | Spain (ESP) | 0 | 1 | 0 | 1 |
| 8 | Czech Republic (CZE) | 0 | 0 | 1 | 1 |
| Totals (8 entries) | | 8 | 8 | 8 | 24 |
