= Emma McIntyre =

Scottish lawn bowler

Personal information
- Nationality: British (Scottish)
- Born: 30 December 1992 (age 33) Scotland

Sport
- Sport: Lawn & indoor bowls
- Club: Dumbarton BC
Medal record
Representing Scotland
World Outdoor Championships
Bronze medal – third place	2023 Gold Coast	pairs
European Bowls Championships
Bronze medal – third place	2017 Jersey	mixed fours
Bronze medal – third place	2017 Jersey	team
Silver medal – second place	2022 Ayr	singles
Bronze medal – third place	2022 Ayr	pairs
Silver medal – second place	2024 Ayr	triples
Silver medal – second place	2024 Ayr	fours

Emma McIntyre (born 30 December 1992) is a Scottish international lawn and indoor bowler.

== Bowls career ==
McIntyre, who bowls for Dumbarton BC came to prominence after winning the women's national under 25 indoor title and winning the 2018 IIBC Championships mixed doubles title with Stewart Anderson.

She has four medals at the 2017 and 2022 European Bowls Championships, which included a silver medal in the singles, where she lost out in the final to Stef Branfield.

Her performances at the European Championships led to her being selected by the national team, to represent them at the sport's blue riband event, the 2023 World Bowls Championship. She participated in the women's singles and the women's pairs events. In the pairs partnering Claire Anderson she won a bronze medal, losing to Malaysia in the semi final.

McIntyre won double silver in the triples and fours at the 2024 European Bowls Championships.
