= 2012 World Outdoor Bowls Championship – Women's singles =

Lawn bowls event

World Outdoor Championships 2012 women's singles
- 12th World Outdoor Bowls Championships
- Location: Adelaide, Australia
- Date(s): 24 November – 9 December 2012.
- Category: 2012 World Outdoor Bowls Championship

The 2012 World Outdoor Bowls Championship women's singles was held at the Lockleys Bowling Club in Adelaide, Australia. Some of the qualifying Rounds were held at the nearby Holdfast Bowling Club in Glenelg North.

Karen Murphy won the women's singles Gold.

== Section tables ==
=== Pool 1 ===
Pos	Player	P	W	L	F	A	Pts	Shots
1	(New Zealand) Val Smith	11	8	3	221	148	16	+73
2	(Australia) Karen Murphy	11	8	3	212	147	16	+65
3	(Canada) Kelly McKerihen	11	8	3	215	184	16	+31
4	(Norfolk Island) Debbie Wilford	11	8	3	186	158	16	+28
5	(Israel) Ruthie Gilor	11	7	4	186	185	14	+1
6	(Wales) Caroline Taylor	11	6	5	204	177	12	+27
7	(China) Yu Xiao Yan	11	5	6	169	202	10	-33
8	(Thailand) Songsin Tsao	11	5	6	178	211	10	-33
9	(Philippines) Milagros Witheridge	11	4	7	187	188	8	-1
10	(Spain) Lynn Greenland	11	3	8	169	204	6	-35
11	(Jersey) Karina Bisson	11	3	8	163	206	6	-43
12	(Botswana) Pauline Lekone	11	1	10	138	218	2	-80

=== Pool 2 ===
Pos	Player	P	W	L	F	A	Pts	Shots
1	(England) Natalie Melmore	11	8	3	215	143	16	+72
2	(South Africa) Tracy-Lee Botha	11	7	4	205	169	14	+36
3	Cliodhan Eadie	11	7	4	211	177	14	+34
4	(Hong Kong) Tammy Tham	11	7	4	212	180	14	+32
5	(Brunei) Umar Sit Ervi Fedarussanti	11	7	4	216	192	14	+24
6	(Scotland) Claire Johnston	11	6	5	214	160	12	+54
7	(Malaysia) Emma Firyana Saroji	11	6	5	189	176	12	+13
8	(Netherlands) Saskia Schaft	11	6	5	187	194	12	-7
9	(Japan) Yoko Goda	11	5	6	169	204	10	-35
10	(Cyprus) Dorothy Gibbons	11	4	7	150	200	8	-50
11	(United States) Kimberly Heiser	11	2	9	122	223	4	-101
12	(Fiji) Elizabeth Moceiwai	11	1	10	154	226	2	-72

== Finals ==
Play Offs
(England) Melmore
bye
(Australia) Murphy	21
(South Africa) Botha	11
(New Zealand) Smith
bye
(Canada) McKerihen	21
Eadie	18

Semifinals
(England) Melmore	15
(Australia) Murphy	21
(New Zealand) Smith	21
(Canada) McKerihen	12

Gold medal
(Australia) Murphy	21
(New Zealand) Smith	17

== Results ==
Women's singles section 1
Round 1 – Nov 29		
New Zealand	Australia	21–20
Canada	Philippines	21–13
Wales	Jersey	21–14
Israel	Spain	21–18
China	Thailand	21–19
Norfolk Island	Botswana	21–12
Round 2 – Nov 29		
Israel	Wales	21–17
Australia	Philippines	21–15
Canada	New Zealand	21–18
China	Botswana	21–13
Norfolk Island	Thailand	21–11
Jersey	Spain	21–8
Round 3 – Nov 30		
Norfolk Island	Philippines	21–12
Spain	Botswana	21–18
New Zealand	Wales	21–17
Australia	Jersey	21–10
Canada	China	21–12
Thailand	Israel	21–17
Round 4 – Nov 30		
Jersey	Botswana	21–11
Wales	Norfolk Island	21–9
China	Philippines	21–16
Canada	Thailand	21–20
Australia	Spain	21–12
Israel	New Zealand	21–16
Round 5 – Nov 30		
Canada	Spain	21–19
New Zealand	Thailand	21–4
Philippines	Israel	21–12
Wales	Botswana	21–19
Norfolk Island	Jersey	21–6
Australia	China	21–7
Round 6 – Dec 1		
Wales	Canada	21–11
Israel	China	21–14
Thailand	Spain	21–19
Australia	Botswana	21–4
Jersey	Philippines	21–19
New Zealand	Norfolk Island	21–1
Round 7 – Dec 1		
New Zealand	Botswana	21–12
Australia	Wales	21–20
China	Spain	21–9
Israel	Jersey	21–9
Thailand	Philippines	21–18
Norfolk Island	Canada	21–18
Round 8 – Dec 2		
Wales	China	21–9
New Zealand	Jersey	21–12
Canada	Australia	21–7
Norfolk Island	Israel	21–5
Spain	Philippines	21–10
Botswana	Thailand	21–8
Round 9 – Dec 2		
Philippines	Botswana	21–4
Israel	Canada	21–18
New Zealand	Spain	21–14
Thailand	Wales	21–18
Norfolk Island	Australia	21–17
China	Jersey	21–19
Round 10 – Dec 3		
New Zealand	China	21–5
Israel	Botswana	21–9
Spain	Norfolk Island	21–8
Australia	Thailand	21–11
Philippines	Wales	21–6
Canada	Jersey	21–17
Round 11 – Dec 3		
Wales	Spain	21–7
Norfolk Island	China	21–14
Australia	Israel	21–5
Canada	Botswana	21–15
Philippines	New Zealand	21–19
Thailand	Jersey	21–13

Women's singles section 2
Round 1 – Nov 29		
Netherlands	Cyprus	21–16
Brunei	Fiji	21–16
Japan	United States	21–16
England	Malaysia	21–20
Scotland	South Africa	21–14
Ireland	Hong Kong	21–16
Round 2 – Nov 29		
Ireland	Netherlands	21–17
England	Scotland	21–15
Brunei	United States	21–14
Fiji	Japan	21–16
Hong Kong	Cyprus	21–10
South Africa	Malaysia	21–17
Round 3 – Nov 30		
South Africa	Japan	21–9
England	Ireland	21–19
Cyprus	United States	21–11
Hong Kong	Malaysia	21–7
Brunei	Scotland	21–18
Netherlands	Fiji	21–15
Round 4 – Nov 30		
United States	Hong Kong	21–20
Japan	Ireland	21–15
Brunei	South Africa	21–18
Malaysia	Cyprus	21–7
England	Netherlands	21–9
Scotland	Fiji	21–20
Round 5 – Nov 30		
Scotland	Cyprus	21–3
England	Fiji	21–5
Netherlands	South Africa	21–19
Ireland	United States	21–3
Japan	Hong Kong	21–19
Brunei	Malaysia	21–18
Round 6 – Dec 1		
Ireland	Scotland	21–14
South Africa	Hong Kong	21–10
England	Japan	21–2
Malaysia	United States	21–12
Netherlands	Brunei	21–18
Cyprus	Fiji	21–10
Round 7 – Dec 1		
Hong Kong	Netherlands	21–9
South Africa	Fiji	21–8
Scotland	Japan	21–10
England	United States	21–3
Malaysia	Ireland	21–12
Cyprus	Brunei	21–17
Round 8 – Dec 2		
Ireland	Brunei	21–20
Hong Kong	England	21–19
Scotland	Malaysia	21–1
Japan	Netherlands	21–20
South Africa	Cyprus	21–11
United States	Fiji	21–12
Round 9 – Dec 2		
Netherlands	Scotland	21–19
South Africa	United States	21–12
Cyprus	England	21–15
Ireland	Fiji	21–12
Malaysia	Japan	21–16
Hong Kong	Brunei	21–14
Round 10 – Dec 3		
Hong Kong	Scotland	21–20
Malaysia	Fiji	21–18
South Africa	Ireland	21–18
Brunei	England	21–13
Netherlands	United States	21–2
Japan	Cyprus	21–8
Round 11 – Dec 3		
Hong Kong	Fiji	21–7
Scotland	United States	21–7
England	South Africa	21–7
Ireland	Cyprus	21–11
Brunei	Japan	21–11
Malaysia	Netherlands	21–6
