= Dominic McVittie =

English bowls player

Personal information
- Nationality: British (English)
- Born: June 1993 (age 33) Lancashire, England

Sport
- Sport: Bowls
- Club: Royal Mail Cart, Lincolnshire (outdoor) / Spalding Lightning IBC (indoor)

Achievements and titles
- Highest world ranking: 6 (October 2025)
Medal record
World Bowls Indoor Championships
Gold medal – first place	2025 Aberdeen	mixed pairs
Silver medal – second place	2025 Aberdeen	singles
European Bowls Championships
Gold medal – first place	2025	mixed pairs
Hong Kong International Classic
Silver medal – second place	2025	pairs
British Isles Championships
Gold medal – first place	2024	fours
English Nationals
Gold medal – first place	2023	fours

Dominic Edward McVittie (born June 1993) is an English international indoor bowler, who won the world pairs gold medal at the 2025 World Bowls Indoor Championships. He is a national champion and has been capped by England. He reached a career high ranking of world number 6 in October 2025.

== Bowls career ==
McVittie came to prominence after winning the 2016 National Under 25 Singles and the World Bowls Junior Indoor Championship mixed triples title in 2017. The following year he helped Lancashire win the 2018 Balcomb Trophy.

Bowling for Royal Mail Cart, Lincolnshire, he won the men's fours title at the 2023 Bowls England National Finals. The winning team represented England at the British Isles Bowls Championships, where they claimed the gold medal.

McVittie reached five consecutive national indoor finals before winning the EIBA Men's Champion of Champions title in 2024 and then one month later won the national singles title at Nottingham defeating Paul Hartley in the final. This qualified him to represent England at the 2025 World Bowls Indoor Championships.

McVittie, a primary school teacher by trade was then selected to represent England during 2024.

In 2025, bowling for his indoor team Spalding, McVittie teamed up with Annie Dunham to win the national mixed pairs indoor title.

Subsequently in 2025, McVittie paired with Emily Kernick won the gold medal at the 2025 World Bowls Indoor Championships in Aberdeen. He also won the silver in the singles.

In September 2025, McVittie again paired with Annie Dunham won the gold medal at the 2025 European Mixed Pairs Championships in Jersey.

In 2026, at the EIBA National Finals at Nottingham, McVittie defeated Mark Hughes to lift the National Singles title for a second time in three years. Weeks later, he joined forces with club mate Jordan Philpott to lift the EIBA National Pairs title for the first time.
