= Lindsey Greechan =

Jersey bowls player

Personal information
- Nationality: British (Channel Islander)
- Born: 22 March 1981 (age 45) Jersey

Sport
- Sport: Lawn bowls
- Club: St Brelade BC

Achievements and titles
- Highest world ranking: 31 (December 2024)
Medal record
Representing Jersey
World Singles Champion of Champions
Bronze medal – third place	2008 Aberdeen	Women's Singles
British Isles Bowls Championships
Gold medal – first place	2008 Belfast	Women's Singles
Gold medal – first place	2013 Leamington Spa	Women's fours
Atlantic Bowls Championships
Gold medal – first place	2007 Ayr	Women's Fours
IIBC Championships
Silver medal – second place	2008	Mixed Pairs
Silver medal – second place	2014	Women's Singles
European Championships
Silver medal – second place	2024 Ayr	singles
Bronze medal – third place	2024 Ayr	pairs

Lindsey Greechan is an international lawn bowls player from Jersey. She became the British singles champion after winning the British Isles Bowls Championships in 2008.

== Bowls career ==
=== Commonwealth Games ===
Lindsey Greechan represented Jersey in lawn bowls at the 2014 Commonwealth Games. With Katie Nixon, the pair lost to Northern Ireland in the pairs bronze medal match 15–14. Had they won the match, they would have been Jersey's first medalists at the Commonwealth Games for 24 years.

=== Other events ===
She became the first bowls player from Jersey to win an IIBC Championships at any level in 2002, when she won the Junior Ladies title. She helped Jersey defeat England in a test series for the first time in 2004.

At the Atlantic Bowls Championships in 2007, Lindsey won gold with Jersey in the women's fours event. In 2008, she came away with a bronze medal at the women's World Singles Champion of Champions event.

Lindsey has won Jersey's women's outdoor Bowler of the Year three times, in 2008, 2010, and 2012. Her mother, Gina Le Long, father, Peter Le Long, and brother, Kevin Le Long, have all played or play bowls competitively as well at national and international level for Jersey.

Greechan won a silver medal in the women's singles and a bronze medal in the pairs with daughter Chloe Greechan, at the 2024 European Bowls Championships.

=== Family ===
Greechan is part of a successful bowls family that includes her husband Thomas and daughter Chloe.
