= Andrew Duncan (bowls) =

Irish lawn and indoor bowls player

Personal information
- Nationality: British (Northern Irish)
- Born: 1989 (age 36–37)

Sport
- Sport: Bowls
- Club: CAIBC / Ballymena
Medal record
Representing combined Ireland
Hong Kong International Bowls Classic
Silver medal – second place	2015	singles

Andrew Duncan (born 1989) is an international lawn and indoor bowler from Northern Ireland.

== Bowls career ==
In 2015, he won the silver medal at the prestigious Hong Kong International Bowls Classic.

He won the Irish National indoor title, which qualified him to represent the combined Irish team at the 2022 World Bowls Indoor Championships.
