= Samantha Atkinson =

Australian lawn bowler

Personal information
- Nationality: Australian
- Born: c.1994 Australia

Sport
- Sport: Bowls
- Club: Dandenong BC

Achievements and titles
- Highest world ranking: 6 (June 2024)
Medal record
Representing Australia
WB Indoor Championships
Gold medal – first place	2024 Guernsey	mixed pairs

Samantha Atkinson (born c.1994) is an Australian international lawn and indoor bowler and world indoor champion. She reached a career high ranking of world number 6 in June 2024.

== Bowls career ==
Atkinson came to prominence in 2023, after winning the 2023 Australian Indoor Championships women's singles title.

Together with Ray Pearse, she won the mixed pairs title at the 2024 World Bowls Indoor Championships, held at the Guernsey Indoor Bowling Association.

By winning the 2024 world indoor mixed pairs title, she propelled herself into a world ranking high of 6.
