= Mo Monkton =

English bowls player

Personal information
- Nationality: British (English)
- Born: November 1955

Sport
- Sport: Lawn bowls
- Club: Ilminster, Somerset
Medal record
Representing England
European Championships
Gold medal – first place	2007 Cyprus	team
Bronze medal – third place	2007 Cyprus	singles
Silver medal – second place	2009 Cyprus	team
National championships
Gold medal – first place	1998	pairs
Silver medal – second place	1998	triples

Maureen Monkton (born November 1955) is a former English international lawn and indoor bowler and the Performance Director for the England bowls team.

== Bowls career ==
Monkton started bowling in 1990. In 1998, she won the national pairs and finished runner up in the national triples at the English national bowls championships.

In 2007, she won two medals at the European Bowls Championships in Cyprus. She won a gold medal in the team and a bronze medal in the singles. Two years later she won a silver medal at the same event and venue in the team event.

From 2012 until 2018, Monkton was a regional selector and then became manager of the England women's team, in addition to being the team manager for Disability Bowls England. In 2023, she became the Performance Director for the England bowls team and will lead the team at the 2023 World Outdoor Bowls Championship in Australia.
