= Jack McShane =

Australian lawn bowler

Personal information
- Nationality: Australian
- Born: 2005

Sport
- Sport: Bowls
- Club: Club Merrylands

Achievements and titles
- Highest world ranking: 2 (December 2024)
Medal record
World Bowls Indoor Championships
Gold medal – first place	2025 Aberdeen	singles
Australian nationals/open
Gold medal – first place	2022	pairs
Gold medal – first place	2022	fours

Jack McShane is an international Australian lawn and indoor bowler, who won the world singles gold medal at the 2025 World Bowls Indoor Championships. He reached a career high ranking of world number 2 in December 2024.

== Bowls career ==
McShane started bowling at the age of 3 and came to prominence in 2022 after winning the pairs with Shawn Thompson at the Australian National Bowls Championships and subsequently being awarded the 2022 Bowls Australia under-18 Bowler of the Year.

During 2024, McShane won the 2024 Australian Open pairs with Joey Clarke and the 2024 Australian Indoor Championships singles which propelled him to number 2 in the world, in addition to qualification for him to represent Australia at the 2025 World Bowls Indoor Championships.

Subsequently in 2025, McShane won the gold medal at the 2025 World Bowls Indoor Championships in Aberdeen.
