= Ruby Hill (bowls) =

English bowls player

Personal information
- Nationality: British (English)
- Born: 2000 (age 25–26) England

Sport
- Sport: Bowls
- Club: Burton House (outdoor) / Spalding IBC (indoor)
Medal record
European Championships
Silver medal – second place	2022 Ayr	triples
Bronze medal – third place	2022 Ayr	fours
Bronze medal – third place	2024 Ayr	triples

Ruby Hill is an English international indoor bowler.

== Bowls career ==
In 2022, she won the English National Under-25 indoor title, which qualified her to represent England at the 2022 World Bowls Indoor Championships. She had previously won the 2020 National indoor triples. Also in 2022, she won triples silver and fours bronze at the European Bowls Championships.

In 2023, she represented England in the British Isles series. and in 2024, Hill was named in the team for the European Bowls Championships.

Hill won a bronze medal in the triples at the 2024 European Bowls Championships and in December 2024, Hill won the silver medal in the mixed pairs at the World Bowls Junior Indoor Championship.
