= 2024 European Bowls Championships =

European Bowls Championship

- 14th
- Location: Northfield Bowls Club, Ayr, Scotland
- Date: 3–8 September 2024
- Category: European Bowls Championships

The 2024 European Bowls Championships was the 2024 edition of the European Bowls Championships, held at the Northfield Bowls Club, in Ayr, Scotland, from 3–8 September 2024. The event was organised by Bowls Europe Ltd and teams of five competed in singles, pairs, triples and fours (rinks) events.

Joe Dawson won the men's singles and Amy Pharaoh won the women's singles. England won four gold medals in total adding the men's triples and women's pairs to the singles. Ireland won three golds and Wales one, with hosts Scotland surprisingly failing to win an elite event.

== Medal winners ==
Event	Gold	Silver	Bronze
Men's singles	(England) Joe Dawson	(Jersey) Ross Davis	(Scotland) Aaron Betts
Men's pairs	Simon Martin; Jack Moffett	(Jersey) Greg Davis; Kevin Le Long	(Scotland) Aaron Betts; Darren Weir
Men's triples	(England) Jack Emmerson; Martin Spencer; Andrew Briden	(Scotland) Blair Davidson; Darren Gualtieri; Dean Riva	Ryan McElroy; Shane Leonard; Mark Wilson
Men's fours	Simon Martin; Jack Moffett; Ryan McElroy; Mark Wilson	(Scotland) Blair Davidson; Darren Gualtieri; Darren Weir; Dean Riva	(Israel) Selwyn Hare; Noam Yehudai; Allan Saitowitz; Dani Slodowniki
Women's singles	(England) Amy Pharaoh	(Jersey) Lindsey Greechan	(Guernsey) Lucy Beere MBE
Women's pairs	(England) Nicole Rogers; Harriet Stevens	Hannah Cochrane; Shauna O'Neill	(Jersey) Chloe Greechan; Lindsey Greechan
Women's triples	(Wales) Sara Nicholls; Jodie McCarthy; Caroline Taylor	(Scotland) Emma McIntyre; Carla Banks; Gail Notman	(England) Ruby Hill; Emily Kernick; Amy Pharaoh
Women's fours	Hannah Cochrane; Rachel Cochrane; Lara Reaney; Chloe Wilson	(Scotland) Emma McIntyre; Carla Banks; Megan Grantham; Gail Notman	(Wales) Lauren Gowen; Jodie McCarthy; Emma Gittins; Caroline Taylor
