= Nicole Rogers =

English lawn and indoor bowls player

Personal information
- Nationality: British (English)
- Born: 1998 (age 27–28)

Sport
- Club: Kings BC Torquay (Outdoor); Exonia (Indoor)

Achievements and titles
- Highest world ranking: 4 (September 2024)
Medal record
Representing England
World Indoor Bowls Championships
Silver medal – second place	2026 Yarmouth	singles
Hong Kong International Bowls Classic
Silver medal – second place	2023	pairs
British Isles Championships
Gold medal – first place	2024	triples
European Championships
Gold medal – first place	2024 Ayr	pairs
English Nationals
Gold medal – first place	2023	triples
World Bowls Junior Indoor Championship
Gold medal – first place	2018	singles
Bronze medal – third place	2019	singles

Nicole Rogers is a female English international lawn and indoor bowler. She reached a career high ranking of world number 4 in September 2024.

== Bowls career ==
In 2018, she won the World under 25 title at the World Bowls Junior Indoor Championship and she secured a bronze medal the following year. Also, in 2020 she reached the semi-finals of the women's singles at the 2020 World Indoor Bowls Championship. Shortly after she won the English under 25 title which was followed by the British under 25 title in March 2020.

In 2023, Rogers reached the semi-finals of the women's singles and the open under 25 singles at the 2023 World Indoor Bowls Championship. Later in August, she won her first major national title, winning the triples with Sophie Tolchard and Harriet Stevens for the King's Club in Torquay at the 2023 Bowls England National Finals. Later in November 2023, she won the silver medal in the pairs with Harriet Stevens, at the Hong Kong International Bowls Classic. Also in 2023, she represented England in the British Isles series.

In 2024, Rogers reached the semi-finals of the women's singles and the mixed pairs at the 2024 World Indoor Bowls Championship. Later in June, Rogers won the triples title at the British Isles Bowls Championships and shortly afterwards won the pairs gold medal with Harriet Stevens, at the 2024 European Bowls Championships.

In 2025, Rogers reached the semi-finals of the women's singles and the mixed pairs at the 2025 World Indoor Bowls Championship. Later in 2025, Rogers reached the final of the inaugural World Bowls Series Finals.

In 2026, Rogers reached the final of the women's singles at the 2026 World Indoor Bowls Championship.

== Personal life ==
She was a student at the University of Exeter.
