= Robert Briglia =

Australian bowls player

Personal information
- Nationality: Australian

Sport
- Sport: Bowls
- Club: Middle Park BC

Robert Briglia is an Australian international lawn and indoor bowler.

== Bowls career ==
In 2019, he won the Australian National indoor title, which qualified him to represent Australia at the 2022 World Bowls Indoor Championships. The event had been cancelled in 2020 and 2021 due to the COVID-19 pandemic.
