= Amy Williams (bowls) =

Welsh bowls player

Personal information
- Nationality: British (Welsh)
- Born: 1993 (age 32–33) Wales

Sport
- Sport: Bowls
- Club: Newport IBC

Achievements and titles
- Highest world ranking: 20 (June 2024)

Amy Williams (born 1993) is a Welsh international indoor bowler. She reached a career high ranking of world number 20 in June 2024.

== Bowls career ==
In 2022, she won the Welsh National indoor title, which qualified her to represent Wales at the 2022 World Bowls Indoor Championships. Williams is also a two times winner of the under-25 title at the IIBC Championships.

She represented Wales at the women's pairs with Lauren Gowen at the 2026 Commonwealth Games and reached the semi finals.
