= Philippine Lawn Bowls Association =

Governing body for the sport of bowls in the Philippines

- Sport: Bowls
- Jurisdiction: Philippines
- Affiliation: World Bowls
- Headquarters: Sunset Valley Mansion
- Location: Clark Bowling Greens, Angeles City, Philippines
- President: Benito Pascual
- Secretary: Alexander Dy-Reyes
- (Philippines)

The Philippine Lawn Bowls Association, listed by World Bowls as the Philippine LBA, is the national governing body for lawn bowls in the Philippines. Based in Angeles City, the organisation is responsible for the promotion and development of lawn bowls in the Philippines, and is affiliated with the world governing body World Bowls.

== History ==
Before the 2019 SEA Games, the national team lacked a competition venue; Clark Development Corporation (CDC) made land available near Friendship Gate, and players and staff helped build the greens with contractors. At the 15th Asian Lawn Bowls Championship in Pattaya in March 2024, the Philippines finished second overall with three gold, one silver, and three bronze medals, and won the women's division overall title.
