= Irish Bowling Association =

Governing body for the sport of bowls for men in Ireland

- Sport: Bowls
- Jurisdiction: Ireland
- Abbreviation: IBA
- Founded: 1904
- Affiliation: World Bowls
- Headquarters: Co. Antrim, Northern Ireland
- Secretary: John Millar

Official website
- www.irishbowlingassociation.co.uk
- (Northern Ireland) & (Republic of Ireland)

The Irish Bowling Association is the governing body for the sport of bowls for men in Ireland. The organisation is responsible for the promotion and development of lawn bowls in Northern Ireland and the Republic of Ireland, and is affiliated with the world governing body World Bowls. The IBA also falls under the umbrella of the Irish Bowls Federation.

== History ==
Bowls in Ireland began with Scottish and English settlers in Northern Ireland during the 17th century.

In 1903, J. C. Hunter of Belfast visited England following an invitation by W.G. Grace and this led to five clubs forming the Irish Bowls Association (IBA) in 1904. However, it was not until the affiliation of the Dublin-based Kenilworth Bowling Club to the IBA that the organisation encompassed all of Ireland.

The Irish National Bowls Championships were inaugurated in 1908.

The Irish Women's Bowling Association was formed in 1947 and as of 2024, Ireland was the only country from the leading bowls nations still to have separate associations for men and women.
