= Lynn Greenland =

Spanish lawn bowler

Personal information
- Nationality: Spanish
Medal record
Representing Spain
European Championships
Gold medal – first place	2013 Spain	pairs
Bronze medal – third place	2013 Spain	mixed
Bronze medal – third place	2013 Spain	team

Lynn Greenland is an international lawn bowler representing Spain.

== Bowls career ==
Greenland joined the Spanish squad in 2007. She represented Spain in the singles event and pairs event at the 2012 World Outdoor Bowls Championship. In 2013, she won three medals including a gold medal at the European Bowls Championships in Spain.
