= Ray Pearse =

Australian lawn bowler

Personal information
- Nationality: Australian
- Born: 25 July 1984 (age 41)
- Occupation: bowls coach

Sport
- Sport: Bowls
- Club: Taren Point

Achievements and titles
- Highest world ranking: 11 (September 2024)
Medal record
Representing Australia
WB Indoor Championships
Gold medal – first place	2024 Guernsey	mixed pairs
Asia Pacific Bowls Championships
Bronze medal – third place	2015 Christchurch	pairs
Silver medal – second place	2015 Christchurch	fours
Bronze medal – third place	2019 Gold Coast	singles
Silver medal – second place	2019 Gold Coast	pairs

Ray Pearse (born 25 July 1984) is an international Australian lawn bowler.

== Bowls career ==
Pearse has won four medals at the Asia Pacific Bowls Championships, a silver medal and bronze medal in 2015 and a bronze in the singles and a silver in the pairs with Nathan Rice at the 2019 Asia Pacific Bowls Championships in the Gold Coast, Queensland.

Pearse won the 2018 Australian National Bowls Championships and also won the NSW Champion of Club Champions Singles and NSW State Singles titles in 2018.

In 2021, he won his second Australian Open crown, this time in the pairs.

Together with Samantha Atkinson, he won the pairs title at the 2024 World Bowls Indoor Championships, held at the Guernsey Indoor Bowling Association. The success in 2024 continued when Pearse won the Australian Open fours title with Peter Taylor, Gary Kelly and Carl Healey, it was Pearse's third Australian Open title.
