= Matt Solway =

Guernsey lawn bowler

Personal information
- Nationality: British (Guernsey)
- Born: 11 February 1985 (age 41)

Sport
- Sport: Lawn bowls
Medal record
Representing Guernsey
European Championships
Gold medal – first place	2015 Israel	pairs
Silver medal – second place	2015 Israel	mixed pairs
Silver medal – second place	2015 Israel	team
Gold medal – first place	2017 Jersey	pairs
Silver medal – second place	2017 Jersey	team
Silver medal – second place	2022 Ayr	pairs

Matt Solway (born 11 February 1985) is an international lawn bowler from Guernsey. He is a six time European champion and has represented Guernsey at the Commonwealth Games on two occasions.

== Biography ==
Solway has won six medals at the European Bowls Championships; the pairs, mixed pairs and team in 2015 and pairs and team in 2017 and the pairs in 2022. In 2018, he made his Commonwealth Games debut for Guernsey at the 2018 Commonwealth Games. He has also competed in the 2016 World Outdoor Bowls Championship and was due to compete in the cancelled 2020 World Outdoor Bowls Championship.

In 2022, he was selected for the 2022 Commonwealth Games in Birmingham where he competed in the men's pairs event.

In 2023, he was selected to represent Guernsey at the 2023 World Outdoor Bowls Championship.
