= Todd Priaulx =

Guernsey lawn bowler

Personal information
- Nationality: British (Guernsey)
- Born: 1 December 1988 (age 37) Guernsey

Sport
- Sport: Lawn bowls
- Club: Guernsey BC
Medal record
Representing Guernsey
Atlantic Bowls Championships
| Bronze medal – third place | 2015 Paphos | singles |
European Championships
| Gold medal – first place | 2019 Guernsey | mixed four |
| Gold medal – first place | 2019 Guernsey | team |
| Silver medal – second place | 2022 Ayr | pairs |

Todd Priaulx is an international lawn bowler from Guernsey.

== Bowls career ==
Priaulx represented Guernsey at the 2014 Commonwealth Games and the 2018 Commonwealth Games. The following year in 2015, he won the singles bronze medal at the Atlantic Bowls Championships.

In 2019, he won two gold medals at the European Bowls Championships. In 2022, he competed in the men's singles and the men's pairs at the 2022 Commonwealth Games.
