= Chelsea Spencer (bowls) =

English bowls player (born 1993)

Chelsea Spencer (née Tomlin)
Personal information
- National team: England
- Born: 1993

Sport
- Club: Spalding Indoor Bowls Club

Chelsea Spencer (née Tomlin) (born 1993) is an English bowls player. She has won multiple national indoor titles and reached the semi-finals in the women's singles at the 2025 World Indoor Bowls Championship.

== Career ==
Spencer began playing bowls at the age of nine, following in the footsteps of her father, Martin Tomlin and grandfather, Mick Tomlin, who competed together in the men's pairs at the 1990 World Indoor Bowls Championship.

Having played for England at under-18 and under-25 levels, she made her full international debut in 2017. A year later, Spencer won the English national women's indoor pairs and mixed fours titles as well as captaining England to the British under-25 team championship. She claimed the English national indoor two bowl women's singles title in 2019 and 2022.

Spencer qualified for the 2025 World Indoor Bowls Championship. After taking part in the mixed pairs alongside Mark Dawes, she made it through to the semi-finals of the women's singles with a win over Lucy Smith. Spencer lost her semi-final match to Beth Riva in a tiebreak after the two sets were split.

== Personal life ==
Spencer is a qualified nurse who works as a ward sister at Pilgrim Hospital in Boston, Lincolnshire.
