= Mark Wilson (bowls) =

Northern Irish lawn bowler (born 1984)

Personal information
- Nationality: British (Northern Irish)
- Born: 1984

Sport
- Sport: Lawn bowls
- Club: Cookstown BC (outdoors)

Achievements and titles
- National finals: 2026 IBA Singles Winner 2024 IBA Pairs Winner 2023 IBA Fours Winner 2019 IBA Pairs Winner 2017 IBA Singles Winner 2011 IBA Pairs Winner 2001 IBA Youth Singles Winner
- Highest world ranking: 16 (October 2024)
Medal record
Gold Medal European Championships Pairs 2026
Gold Medal European Championships Fours 2026
IBA Singles Winner 2026
City of Belfast Singles Winner 2026
Silver Medal Atlantic International Challenge 2025
British Bowls Championships Pairs Silver Medal 2025 & 2022
Gold Medal European Championships Fours 2024
Bronze Medal European Championships 2024
Irish Bowling Association Pairs Winner 2024
Gold Medal Hong Kong Classic Singles 2023
Bronze Medal Hong Kong Classic Pairs 2023
Irish Bowling Association Fours Winner 2023 Gold Medal European Championships Triples 2022
Bronze Medal European Championships Fours 2022
Irish Bowling Association Pairs Winner 2011 & 2019
Atlantic Rim Fours Bronze Medalist 2019
Irish Bowling Association Singles Winner 2017
Silver Medal European Championships Pairs 2017
Silver Medal European Championships Fours 2017
Gold Medal European Championships Overall Team 2017
Bronze Medal Hong Kong Classic Pairs 2016
Bronze Medal European Championships Pairs 2013

Mark Wilson (born 1984) is a Northern Irish lawn bowler. He reached a career high ranking of world number 16 in October 2024.

== Bowls career ==
Wilson is a six time National Champion, winning two singles, three pairs and one fours title at the Irish National Bowls Championships. In 2017, he won three medals at the European Bowls Championships, he had previously won a bronze in 2013 at the Championships.

In 2019, he won the fours bronze medal at the Atlantic Bowls Championships and in 2020 he was selected for the 2020 World Outdoor Bowls Championship in Australia but the event was cancelled due to the COVID-19 pandemic.

In 2022, he won a triples gold at the European Bowls Championships. In 2023, he won the gold medal in the singles at the Hong Kong International Bowls Classic. Wilson won gold in the fours and bronze in the triples at the 2024 European Bowls Championships.
