= Thomas Greechan =

Scottish bowls player (born 1976)

Personal information
- Nationality: British (Scottish / Jersey)
- Born: 19 June 1976 (age 50) Glasgow, Scotland

Sport
- Sport: Lawn bowls
- Club: St Brelade BC
Medal record
Representing Jersey
World Singles Champion of Champions
Gold medal – first place	2011 Hong Kong	Men's Singles
British Isles Bowls Championships
Gold medal – first place	2016 Belmont	Men's Singles
IIBC Championships
Gold medal – first place	2015 Grainville	Mixed Pairs
Silver medal – second place	2008 Swansea	Mixed Pairs
Atlantic Bowls Championships
Silver medal – second place	2007 Ayr	Men's Fours
British Isles Championships
Gold medal – first place	2017	singles

Thomas Greechan (born 19 June 1976) is a Scottish born international lawn bowls player from Jersey. He became the British singles champion after winning the British Isles Bowls Championships in 2016.

== Bowls career ==
=== World Championships ===
Greechan has competed for Jersey at two World Bowls Championships in 2000 and 2012.

=== Commonwealth Games ===
He has represented Jersey at two Commonwealth Games; at the 2002 and the 2014 Commonwealth Games.

=== Other events ===
In addition to his British Isles Championship success he won the Jersey's first World Singles Champion of Champions in 2011, in Hong Kong. He beat Jonathan Ross of Scotland in a tie-break set 5–0, despite dropping the first set.

Greechan also medalled at the 2007 Atlantic Bowls Championships, with silver in the men's fours event. Jersey's bowls team, which finished second in the overall combined medal table at the Games, narrowly missed out on 2008 Channel Islands' Team of the Year to Jersey's cricketers.

In April 2015, Greechan won the IIBC Championships Mixed Pairs world title with his 14-year-old daughter, Chloe.

=== Family and awards ===
In 2012, Thomas Greechan was voted Channel Islands' Sports Personality of the Year and won Sports Person of the Year in Jersey. He has also been selected as Jersey's men's outdoor Bowler of the Year twice, in 2005, and 2006.
