= Jason Banks (bowls) =

Scottish lawn bowler (born 1996)

Personal information
- Nationality: British (Scottish)
- Born: 29 June 1996 (age 30)

Sport
- Club: Inverurie BC (outdoors); Garioch IBC (indoors)

Achievements and titles
- Highest world ranking: 1 (March 2025)
Medal record
Representing Scotland
World Outdoor Championships
Silver medal – second place	2023 Gold Coast	fours
Bronze medal – third place	2023 Gold Coast	team
Bowls World Cup
Silver medal – second place	2025 Kuala Lumpur	men's pairs
European Championships
Bronze medal – third place	2017 Jersey	pairs
Bronze medal – third place	2017 Jersey	mixed four
Bronze medal – third place	2017 Jersey	team
Gold medal – first place	2022 Ayr	fours
Bronze medal – third place	2022 Ayr	pairs
World Indoor Bowls Championships
Silver medal – second place	2023 Yarmouth	singles
Silver medal – second place	2024 Yarmouth	Open pairs
Gold medal – first place	2025 Yarmouth	Open pairs
Gold medal – first place	2025 Yarmouth	Mixed pairs
Gold medal – first place	2025 Yarmouth	singles

Jason Banks (born 1996) is a Scottish international lawn and indoor bowler. He reached a career high ranking of world number 1 in March 2025.

== Bowls career ==
Banks reached the 2014 National Indoor Singles final and in 2019 won the National Under 25 Singles. In 2019 he won the Junior singles title at the IIBC Championships. In 2017, he won three medals at the European Bowls Championships.

In 2020, he was selected for the 2020 World Outdoor Bowls Championship in Australia as the men's team travelling reserve but the event was cancelled due to the COVID-19 pandemic. In 2022, he won fours gold and pairs bronze at the European Bowls Championships.

Banks recorded his best result to date when he reached the final of the 2023 World Indoor Bowls Championship, he was unlucky to lose to Jamie Walker after playing so consistently in the final.

In 2023, he was selected as part of the team to represent Scotland at the 2023 World Outdoor Bowls Championship. He participated in the men's pairs and the men's fours events. In the pairs with Iain McLean, they won their group undefeated but were then knocked out in the quarter finals by Australia. One week later in the fours partnering Derek Oliver, Paul Foster and Alex Marshall, the team won their group before reaching the final against Australia, where he won a silver medal after losing 12–10.

Playing with Michael Stepney, Banks won the open pairs title at the 2025 World Indoor Bowls Championship, defeating Jason Greenslade and Robert Paxton in the final and then the following day he claimed the mixed pairs title, teaming with Beth Riva to beat Paul Foster and Katherine Rednall in the final. Banks became the first player in the history of the WBT World Indoor Championship to win three events at one Championships, when he won the open singles title on the final day of the 2025 edition.

In November 2025, he won the silver medal after reaching the final of the 2025 Bowls World Cup, where he partnered Paul Foster in the pairs event.

== Family ==
His father Colin Banks and his sister Carla Banks are both international bowlers.
