= Ian Merrien =

Guernsey international lawn bowler (born 1973)

Personal information
- Full name: Ian Michael Merrien
- Nationality: British (Guernsey)
- Born: 23 July 1973 (age 53) Guernsey
- Height: 1.72 m (5 ft 8 in) (2002)
- Weight: 73 kg (161 lb) (2002)
- Spouse: Alison Merrien
Medal record
Representing Guernsey
Atlantic Bowls Championships
Bronze medal – third place	2007 Ayr	triples
World Bowls Indoor Championships
Bronze medal – third place	2025 Aberdeen	mixed pairs

Ian Michael Merrien (born 23 July 1973) is a Guernsey international lawn bowler.

== Bowls career ==
Merrien has represented Guernsey at three Commonwealth Games; in the singles at the 2002 Commonwealth Games, in the triples at the 2006 Commonwealth Games and in the pairs at the 2014 Commonwealth Games.

In 2007, he won the triples bronze medal at the Atlantic Bowls Championships.

Merrien partnering his wife, won the mixed pairs bronze medal at the 2025 World Bowls Indoor Championships in Aberdeen.

He was the Guernsey's 2026 Commonwealth Games opening ceremony baton bearer.

== Personal life ==
He is married to world champion bowler Alison Merrien.
