= Gary Mackie =

Scottish international lawn bowler

Personal information
- Nationality: British (Scottish)
- Born: 30 December 1970 (age 55)

Sport
- Sport: Lawn and indoor bowls
- Club: Kirkcaldy West End BC
Medal record
Representing Scotland
British Isles Championships
Gold medal – first place	1997	pairs
Scottish Nationals
Gold medal – first place	1996	pairs

Gary Mackie (born 30 December 1970) is a former international lawn bowler from Scotland who competed at the Commonwealth Games.

== Biography ==
Mackie was a member of the Kirkcaldy West End Bowls Club and represented Scotland at international level from 1998 to 2006.

Mackie represented the Scottish team at the 2002 Commonwealth Games in Manchester, England, where he competed in the fours event, with Graeme Archer, Willie Wood and David Peacock.

He was the pairs champion of Scotland at the 1996 Scottish National Bowls Championships and subsequently qualified to represent Scotland at the British Isles Bowls Championships, where they won the fours title in 1973.

In 2018, he won the Fife Bowling Association Fours competition.
