= Damian Doubler =

Welsh bowls player

Personal information
- Nationality: British (Welsh)
- Born: 1989 (age 36–37)

Sport
- Sport: Lawn and Indoor Bowls
- Club: Cardiff IBC (indoors); Penylan BC (outdoors)
Medal record
Men's Bowls
Representing Wales
World Indoor Championships
Silver medal – second place	2017 Yarmouth	Open pairs
British Isles Indoor Championships
Gold medal – first place	2015 Stanley	singles
Gold medal – first place	2017 Belfast	triples
Gold medal – first place	2024 Chelmsford	fours
Welsh Nationals (Outdoor)
Gold medal – first place	2006	U25 singles
Gold medal – first place	2021	fours
Welsh Nationals (Indoor)
Gold medal – first place	2012	singles
Gold medal – first place	2014	singles
Gold medal – first place	2016	pairs
Gold medal – first place	2016	triples
Gold medal – first place	2019	triples
Gold medal – first place	2021	fours
Gold medal – first place	2022	pairs
Gold medal – first place	2023	fours
IIBC Championships
Gold medal – first place	2012	singles
Gold medal – first place	2014	mixed pairs

Damain Doubler (born 1989) is a Welsh international lawn and indoor bowler.

== Bowls career ==
In 2014 he won the World Indoor Bowls Council Mens Singles Championship having previously won the 2012 mixed pairs title at the same event.

In 2017, he reached the final of the open pairs during the 2017 World Indoor Bowls Championship with his playing partner Daniel Salmon

Outdoors, Doubler won his first National title in 2006 after winning the men's under 25 singles title at the 2006 Welsh National Bowls Championships, bowling for Penylan BC.

In 2017 he won the National Fours title having previously finished runner-up in the same event during the 2017 Championships.
