= Colin Peacock =

Scottish lawn bowler

Personal information
- Nationality: British (Scottish)
- Born: 26 May 1960 (age 66)

Sport
- Club: Marchmount BC, Dumfries
Medal record
Scottish National Championships
Gold medal – first place	1994	singles

Colin Peacock (born 1960) is a former Scottish international lawn bowler.

== Bowls career ==
Peacock has represented Scotland at the Commonwealth Games, in the triples event at the 2006 Commonwealth Games.

He became the Scottish champion after winning the singles title at the 1994 Scottish National Bowls Championships, bowling for, Marchmount Bowling Club,
