= Mark McGreal =

Isle of Man bowls player (born 1986)

Personal information
- Nationality: British
- Born: 2 May 1986 (age 40) Pontypridd, Wales

Sport
- Sport: Bowls

Mark McGreal (born 2 May 1986) is an international lawn and indoor bowler from the Isle of Man.

== Bowls career ==
In 2018, McGreal represented the Isle of Man at the 2018 Commonwealth Games in the Lawn bowls tournament held on the Gold Coast in Australia.

In 2022, he won his fourth Isle of Man National indoor singles title, which qualified him to represent the Isle of Man at the 2022 World Bowls Indoor Championships. The event had been cancelled in 2020 and 2021 due to the COVID-19 pandemic.

In 2025, McGreal won his fifth Isle of Man National indoor singles title, which qualified him to represent the Isle of Man at the 2025 World Bowls Indoor Championships. McGreal qualified for the knockout stages having finished second in his section during the pool stages.

In 2026, he was selected to represent the Isle of Man at the 2026 Commonwealth Games.

== Personal life ==
McGreal was born in Wales to a Welsh father and Manx mother.
