= Nor Farah Ain Abdullah =

Malaysian lawn bowler

Personal information
- Nationality: Malaysian
- Born: circa.2000/2001 Malaysia

Achievements and titles
- Highest world ranking: 1 (March 2025)
Medal record
Representing Malaysia
WB Indoor Championships
Gold medal – first place	2024 Guernsey	singles
Asian Lawn Bowls Championship
Gold medal – first place	2024 Pattaya	fours

Nor Farah Ain Abdullah (born circa.2000/2001) is an international lawn and indoor bowler from Malaysia. She reached a career high ranking of world number 1 in March 2025.

== Bowls career ==
Abdullah came to prominence in 2024 after winning the gold medal in the fours at the 15th Asian Lawn Bowls Championship, held in Pattaya, Thailand, during March 2024.

Two months later in May, she lifted the women's singles title at the 2024 World Bowls Indoor Championships, held at the Guernsey Indoor Bowling Association.
