= International Indoor Bowls Council =

Sports organisation

International Indoor Bowls Council (IIBC)
- Type: Sports federation
- Website: https://iibc.org.uk/

International Indoor Bowls Council (IIBC for short) is an international sport federation of Bowls.

In 2019, the IIBC came to an agreement with the World Bowls to merge their two international indoor championships, the World Cup Singles and the IIBC Championships. The new event would be called the World Bowls Indoor Championships.

== Events held by the IIBC ==
- World Bowls Indoor Championships (indoors), annually
- IIBC Championships (indoors), annually for the under-25 age bracket

== Rival organisations ==
- World Bowls, (controlling body for the laws of the sport and the organisers of the World Bowls Championships (outdoor))
- World Bowls Tour (organiser of the World Indoor Bowls Championships)

== Founder members ==
- The English Indoor Bowling Association
- The Association of Irish Indoor Bowls
- The Scottish Indoor Bowling Association
- The Welsh Indoor Bowling Association

== Members ==
The following are a list of member nations and organisations of the IIBC:

- English Indoor Bowling Association (EIBA)
- Guernsey Indoor Bowling Association (GIBA)
- Association of Irish Indoor Bowls (AIBA)
- Irish Women's Indoor Bowling Association (IWIBA)
- Isle of Man Bowling Association (IMBA)
- Jersey Indoor Bowling Association (JIBA)
- Nederlandse Indoor & Outdoor Bowls Bond (NIOBB)
- Scottish Indoor Bowling Association (SIBA)
- Welsh Indoor Bowls Association (WIBA)
- Welsh Ladies Indoor Bowls Association (WLIBA)

== See also ==
- World Bowls events
