= Andrew Kyle =

Irish bowler (born 1978)

Personal information
- Nationality: British (Northern Irish)
- Born: 8 July 1978 (age 47) Larne, Northern Ireland

Sport
- Sport: Lawn & indoor bowls
- Club: County Antrim (indoors); Larne BC (outdoors)
Medal record
Representing combined Ireland
Atlantic Bowls Championships
Bronze medal – third place	2019 Cardiff	triples
European Championships
Silver medal – second place	2017 Jersey	pairs
Silver medal – second place	2017 Jersey	mixed four
Gold medal – first place	2017 Jersey	team

Andrew Kyle (born 8 July 1978) is a Northern Irish international lawn and indoor bowler.

Kyle bowls for County Antrim Bowling Club indoors and Larne Bowling Club outdoors and in 2016 represented a combined Irish team at the Bowls World Cup in Australia. In 2017, he won three medals at the European Bowls Championships.

Kyle was selected as part of the Northern Ireland team for the 2018 Commonwealth Games on the Gold Coast in Queensland.

In 2019, he won the fours bronze medal at the Atlantic Bowls Championships.
