= World Bowls =

Sports organisation

- Formation: 2001
- Type: Sports federation
- Headquarters: Melbourne, Australia
- Members: 84 members
- Official language: English
- President: Brett O'Riley
- Website: https://www.worldbowls.com/

World Bowls is an international sport federation of Bowls. World Bowls administers bowls around the world and is responsible for the sports premier event, the World Bowls Championship which is held every four years.

The organisation was founded in 2001 in an attempt to unite some of the multiple bowls bodies running the sport. The founding was a merger of previous organisations; the World Bowls Board and the International Women's Bowling Board.

In 2019, World Bowls came to an agreement with the International Indoor Bowls Council (IIBC). The agreement was to merge their two international indoor championships, the World Cup Singles and the IIBC Championships. The new event would be called the World Bowls Indoor Championships.

In 2021, Australian Darryl Clout was elected World Bowls President following the resignation of John Bell. In 2022, the headquarters for World Bowls moved from Edinburgh in Scotland to Melbourne in Australia. The plans to hold a World championship every two years were scrapped and a new event called the World Cup was introduced instead.

In 2024, Brett O'Riley from New Zealand became President of World Bowls.

== Main events held by World Bowls ==
- World Bowls Championship (outdoors), blue riband event of the sport (held every four years)
- World Cup (outdoors), every four years
- World Singles Champion of Champions (outdoors), annually
- World Bowls Indoor Championships (indoors), annually and the rival of the BBC televised World Indoor Bowls Championships

== Rival organisations ==
- World Bowls Tour (represents professional indoor bowlers and promotes several indoor events including the BBC televised World Indoor Bowls Championships)

== World Bowls members ==
List as of November 2024:

- Africa:
1. Botswana (Botswana BA)
2. Ghana (Ghana BA)
3. Kenya (Kenya BA)
4. Malawi (BA of Malawi)
5. Namibia (Namibia BA)
6. Nigeria (Nigeria Bowling Federation)
7. South Africa (Bowls South Africa)
8. Zambia (Zambia BA)
9. Zimbabwe (Bowls Zimbabwe)
- Americas:
1. Argentina (Federacion Argentina De Bowls)
2. Brazil (Bowls Brazil)
3. Canada (Bowls Canada Boulingrin)
4. Falkland Islands (Falkland Islands L.B.A)
5. Jamaica (Jamaica Lawn Bowling Association)
6. United States (Bowls USA)
- Asia:
1. Brunei (Brunei Darussalam LBA)
2. China (Chinese Multi Bowls Association)
3. Hong Kong (Hong Kong LBA)
4. India (Bowling Federation of India)
5. Iran (Bowling & Billiard Federation of I.R.Iran)
6. Japan (Bowls Japan)
7. Macau (Macao Lawn Bowls General Association)
8. Malaysia (Malaysia LBF)
9. Pakistan (Pakistan Lawn Bowls Federation)
10. Philippines (Philippine LBA)
11. Singapore (Bowls Singapore)
12. South Korea (South Korea BA)
13. Sri Lanka (Lawn Bowls Federation of Sri Lanka)
14. Thailand (Lawn Bowls Association of Thailand)
- Europe:
1. Cyprus (Bowls Cyprus)
2. Czech Republic (Czech Bowls Association)
3. England (Bowls England)
4. France (Federation Francaise de Lawn Bowls)
5. Germany (German Bowls Federation)
6. Guernsey (Bowls Guernsey Association)
7. Hungary (Bowls Hungary)
8. Ireland, combined ((IBA)/(WIBA))
9. Isle of Man (Bowls Isle of Man)
10. Israel (Israel LBA)
11. Jersey (Bowls Jersey)
12. Malta (Malta Lawn Bowls Federation)
13. Netherlands (Nederlandse Bowls Bond)
14. Portugal (Bowls Portugal)
15. Scotland (Bowls Scotland)
16. Spain (Lawn Bowls Spain)
17. Sweden (Swedish Bowls Federation)
18. Switzerland (Swiss Bowls)
19. Turkey (Turkish Bocce, Bowls, Bowling and Darts Federation)
20. Wales (Welsh Lawn Bowls)
- Oceania:
1. Australia (Bowls Australia)
2. Cook Islands (Bowls Cook Island)
3. Fiji (Bowls Fiji)
4. New Zealand (Bowls New Zealand)
5. Niue (Niue Lawn Bowls Association)
6. Norfolk Island (Norfolk Island Bowling Club & Bowls Council)
7. Papua New Guinea (Bowls - PNG)
8. Samoa (Samoan Bowling Association)
9. Tokelau (Bowls Tokelau)
10. Tonga (Tonga Lawn Bowls Federation)
- Former Members:
1. Eswatini (Swaziland Bowling Association)

== Regions ==
59 Countries in 5 Zones

Zone	Region	Countries
1	Africa	9
4	Americas	6
2	Asia	14
5	Europe	20
3	Oceania	10
Total	World	59

== See also ==
- World lawn and indoor bowls events
