= World Bowls Junior Indoor Championship =

Annual indoor bowls event

Tournament information
- Sport: Indoor bowls
- Established: 1998
- Administrator: World Bowls and IIBC
- Participants: under–25 age group
- Website: IIBC

The World Bowls Junior Indoor Championship (formerly the IIBC Championships) are an annual indoor bowls world championship event for the under–25 age group, run by the governing body of the sport, World Bowls in collaboration with the International Indoor Bowls Council (IIBC).

== History ==
The under–25 age group events were established in 1998 and continue today. From 2000 until 2019 there were disciplines at senior level. In 2019, the IIBC came to an agreement with the World Bowls organisation. The agreement was to merge their two international indoor championships, the IIBC Championships and the World Cup Singles. The new event would be called the World Bowls Indoor Championships.

In 2004, the mixed pairs event was added to the under 25 championships for the first time. In 2005, Guernsey hosted the under 25 championships for the first time. In 2012, Amy Stanton became the first female to win the women's title three years running. In 2014, Chloe Watson became the first Irish and youngest ever winner of the women's title at the age of 17.

== Past winners ==
=== U25 events ===
Year	Men's Singles		Women's Singles		Mixed Doubles		Ref
Year	Winner	Finalist	Winner	Finalist	Winner	Finalist	Ref
1998	(Scotland) Darren Burnett	(England) Mark Royal	Did not take place		Did not take place		
1999	(Scotland) Darren Burnett	(Australia) Brett Duprez	(Australia) Karen Murphy	Claire Kelly	Did not take place		
2000	(Scotland) Darren Burnett	(Northern Ireland) Barry Browne	(Australia) Stacey Collier	(England) Cheryl Northall	Did not take place		
2001	(Scotland) Darren Burnett	(Northern Ireland) Andrew Kyle	(Scotland) Caroline Brown	(Australia) Yvonne Lovelock	Did not take place		
2002	(Australia) Mark Casey	(Israel) Boaz Marcus	(Jersey) Lindsey Greechan	(Scotland) Caroline Brown	Did not take place		
2003	(England) Simon Jones	(Scotland) Stuart Cruickshank	(England) Claire Spreadbury	(Australia) Lynsey Armitage	Did not take place		
2004	(New Zealand) Jamie Hill	(Scotland) Wayne Hogg	(England) Amy Monkhouse	(Jersey) Lindsey Greechan	(Scotland) Wayne Hogg; Catherine Beattie	(Canada) Ryan Bester (Jersey) Lindsey Greechan	
2005	(Scotland) Wayne Hogg	(England) Mark Dawes	(England) Gemma Broadhurst	(Scotland) Michelle Cooper	(Scotland) Wayne Hogg; Catherine McMillen	(England) Mark Dawes (Jersey) Lindsey Greechan	
2006	(England) Jamie Chestney	(Malaysia) Safuan Said	(Wales) Kerry Packwood	(Jersey) Lyndsey Greechan	(England) Lucy Beere (Wales) David Axon	(Malaysia) Nor Iryani Azmi (Guernsey) Craig Dorey	
2007	(Northern Ireland) Barry Kane	(Malaysia) M Hizlee A Rais	(Malaysia) Nur Fidrah Noh	(Wales) Hannah Smith	(Malaysia) Zuraini Khalid (England) Sam Tolchard	(Malaysia) Shafeeqah Yahya; Barry Kane	
2008	(Scotland) Stewart Anderson	(Scotland) Ronnie Duncan	(England) Jamie-Lea Winch	(Wales) Kerry Packwood	(Scotland) Lisa Barrett (Guernsey) Craig Dorey	(England) Amy Stanton; Patrick Burns	
2009	(Scotland) Stewart Anderson	(Scotland) Brian Irvine	(Wales) Kerry Packwood	(Scotland) Michelle Cooper	Clionda Boyce (Guernsey) Dan De la Mere	(Wales) Kerry Packwood (Jersey) Jamie McDonald	
2010	(Scotland) Steven Allan	(Scotland) Stewart Anderson	(England) Amy Stanton	(Wales) Hanna Clarke	(Scotland) Michelle Cooper (Wales) Owain Dando	(Wales) Hanna Clarke (Scotland) Steven Allan	
2011	(England) Shaun Jones	(Northern Ireland) Darren Atkinson	(England) Amy Stanton	(England) Rebecca Field	(Guernsey) Sophie Rabey (Scotland) Calum Logan	(England) Amy Stanton (Wales) Ross Owen	
2012	(England) Perry Martin	(Scotland) Calum Logan	(England) Amy Stanton	(Scotland) Michelle Keenan	(Guernsey) Lauren Batiste (England) Perry Martin	(Guernsey) Sophie Rabey (Scotland) Calum Logan	
2013	(Scotland) Martin Williamson	(England) Perry Martin	(Scotland) Carrie McLean	(England) Amy Stanton	(Guernsey) Sophie Rabey (Scotland) Calum Logan	(Northern Ireland) Chloe Watson (England) Scott Whiting	
2014	(England) Jamie Watkins	(Wales) Liam Bouse	(Northern Ireland) Chloe Watson	(Wales) Amy Williams	(England) Victoria Bilson (Wales) Liam Bouse	(Northern Ireland) Chloe Watson (Scotland) Martin Jenkins	
2015	(England) Ryan Atkins	(Scotland) John Fleming	(Wales) Amy Williams	(Scotland) Claire Walker	(England) Ryan Atkins (Scotland) Carrie McLean	(Scotland) John Fleming (Wales) Ysie White	
2016/17	(Jersey) Scott Baxter	(Wales) Jarrad Breen	(England) Katherine Rednall	(Scotland) Carla Banks	(Scotland) Rebecca Houston (Canada) Erik Galipeau (England) Dominic McVittie	(Wales) Katie Thomas (Jersey) Scott Baxter (Scotland) Connor Milne	
2017/18	(England) Edward Elmore	(Wales) Ross Owen	(Wales) Amy Williams	(Northern Ireland) Chloe Watson	(Canada) Emma Boyd (Wales) Daniel Salmon (Scotland) Mark O'Hagan	(Canada) Owen Kirby (England) Edward Elmore (Scotland) Emma McIntyre	
2018/19	Robert Kirkwood	(Scotland) Stephen Lowrie	(England) Nicole Rogers	(England) Chelsea Tomlin	(Hong Kong) Yau Tze Fung (Hong Kong) Leung Seen Wah	(Wales) Dan Salmon (Wales) Lowri Powell	
2019/20	(Scotland) Jason Banks	(England) Connor Cinato	(Tonga) Paris Baker	(Australia) Jessica Srisamruaybai	Adam McKeown; Zoe Minish	(Wales) Jordan Driscoll (Tonga) Paris Baker	
2021	cancelled due to COVID-19 pandemic						
2022	(England) Harry Goodwin	(Australia) Nick Cahill	(Australia) Brianna Smith	(Hong Kong) Yu See Sin	(England) Harry Goodwin (England) Ruby Hill	(Australia) Nick Cahill (Australia) Brianna Smith	
2023	(Australia) Nathan Black	(Malaysia) Idham Amin Ramlan	Shauna O'Neill	(Scotland) Aimee Harris	Ryan McElroy; Shauna O'Neill	(England) Harry Goodwin; Emily Kernick	
2024	(Australia) Kane Nelson	(Scotland) Paul Innes	(Malta) Rebecca Rixon	(Philippines) Angeleca Abatayo	(Australia) Kane Nelson; Kira Bourke	(England) Aaron Johnson; Ruby Hill	

=== Discontinued senior events ===
The senior events (now defunct) ran from 2000 to 2019.

In 2010, Wales' Kerry Packwood recorded the first ever whitewash and the highest score in the championships history, in a first round win against Mary Alderson from the Isle of Man, winning the match in straight sets 17–0, 19–0. In 2013, Jersey staged the senior championships for the first time. It has previously staged the under 25 event. In 2014, Julie Forrest of Scotland became the first person to win the men's or women's title for a record fourth time. In 2015, Chloe Greechan of Jersey became the youngest ever bowls world champion at 14-years-old, winning the mixed pairs title with her father, Thomas Greechan.

Year	Men's Singles		Women's Singles		Mixed Doubles		Ref
Year	Winner	Finalist	Winner	Finalist	Winner	Finalist	Ref
2000	(Scotland) Graeme Archer	(Scotland) Darren Burnett	(New Zealand) Marlene Castle	Margaret Johnston			
2001	(Scotland) Darren Burnett	Michael Nutt	(Scotland) Betty Brown	(Australia) Marion Pedell	(Guernsey) Alison Merrien (Guernsey) Adrian Welch		
2002	(England) David Miller	(Wales) Jeff Webley	(England) Carol Ashby	(Wales) Betty Morgan	(Scotland) Julie Forrest (Scotland) Mark Johnston		
2003	Stevie Moran	(Guernsey) Neal Mollet	(England) Carol Ashby	(New Zealand) Wendy Jensen	(Scotland) Julie Forrest (Scotland) Mark Johnston		
2004	(England) Mark O'Riordan	(Australia) Steve Glasson	(Scotland) Julie Forrest	(England) Carol Ashby	(Guernsey) Alison Merrien (Guernsey) Neal Mollet		
2005	(England) Jeff Wells	(Scotland) Darren Burnett	(Scotland) Margaret Letham	(Scotland) Julie Forrest	(England) Michelle Roberts (England) Mark Walton		
2006	(Guernsey) Nicky Donaldson	(Scotland) Andrew Barker	(Scotland) Margaret Letham	(England) Carol Ashby	(England) Sue Estoby (England) Mark Walton		
2007	(England) Mervyn King	(Guernsey) Gary Pitschou	(Scotland) Claire Johnston	(England) Carol Ashby	(Scotland) Claire Johnston (Scotland) Iain McLean		
2008	(Scotland) Colin Walker	Garry Kelly	(England) Sarah Seymour	(Scotland) Claire Johnston	(England) Suzanne King (England) Mervyn King		
2009	(Scotland) Neil Speirs	(Scotland) Stewart Anderson	(Guernsey) Alison Merrien	(Wales) Kerry Packwood	(Scotland) Margaret Letham (Scotland) Neil Speirs		
2010	(England) Graham Smith	(Scotland) Michael Stepney	(Scotland) Julie Forrest	Muriel Wilkinson	(Scotland) Margaret Letham (Scotland) Stewart Anderson		
2011	(England) Graham Smith	(Scotland) Stewart Anderson	(Wales) Betty Morgan MBE	(Scotland) Julie Forrest	(Wales) Carl Wood (Wales) Betty Morgan		
2012	(Scotland) Steve Allan	(Guernsey) Gary Pitchou	(Wales) Laura Thomas	(Jersey) Alison Comacho	(Wales) Kerry Packwood (Wales) Damian Doubler	(Wales) Marion Purcell (Scotland) Steve Allan	
2013	(Scotland) Steve Allan	Simon Martin	(Scotland) Julie Forrest	(Wales) Laura Thomas	(Scotland) Julie Forrest (Scotland) Jonathan Ross		
2014	(Wales) Damian Doubler	(England) Mark Dawes	(Scotland) Julie Forrest	(Jersey) Lindsey Greechan	(Scotland) Lynn Stein (Scotland) Iain McLean		
2015	(Jersey) Scott Baxter	(Scotland) Michael Stepney	(Guernsey) Alison Merrien MBE	(Scotland) Leanne Fuyre	(Jersey) Chloe Greechan (Jersey) Thomas Greechan		
2016	(Northern Ireland) Andrew Kyle	(Scotland) Martin Williamson	(England) Katherine Rednall	(Northern Ireland) Chloe Watson	(Jersey) Chloe Greechan (Jersey) Malcolm De Sousa	(Northern Ireland) Chloe Watson (Northern Ireland) Andrew Kyle	
2017	(Wales) Jarrad Breen	(Wales) Damian Doubler	(Northern Ireland) Chloe Watson	(Scotland) Claire Johnston	(England) Annalisa Dunham (England) Martin Spencer	(England) Amy Stanton (Wales) Damian Doubler	
2018	(Scotland) Stewart Anderson	(England) Andy Squire	(Guernsey) Alison Merrien MBE	(Wales) Kerry Packwood	(Scotland) Stewart Anderson (Scotland) Emma McIntyre	(Guernsey) Alison Merrien MBE (Guernsey) Ian Merrien	
2019	(Scotland) Stewart Anderson	(England) Devon Cooper	(Guernsey) Alison Merrien MBE	(Wales) Jack Breen	(England) Martin Puckett (England) Devon Cooper	(Wales) Mike Brain (Wales) Kerry Packwood	

- DISCONTINUED
