= Saskia Schaft =

Dutch international lawn bowler

Personal information
- Nationality: Dutch
- Born: 1965

Sport
- Club: Almere BC
Medal record
Representing Netherlands
World Singles Champion of Champions
| Silver medal – second place | 2014 Christchurch | singles |
Atlantic Bowls Championships
| Bronze medal – third place | 2009 Johannesburg | singles |
| Silver medal – second place | 2015 Paphos | singles |
European Championships
| Silver medal – second place | 2015 Israel | pairs |
| Bronze medal – third place | 2015 Israel | team |

Saskia Schaft (born 1965), is a Dutch international lawn bowler.

== Bowls career ==
=== World Championships ===
She competed for the Netherlands at the 2012 World Outdoor Bowls Championship in Australia and 2016 World Outdoor Bowls Championship in New Zealand. In 2020 she was selected for the 2020 World Outdoor Bowls Championship in Australia.

=== World Singles Champion of Champions ===
Schaft was runner-up to Lorna Smith in the 2016 World Singles Champion of Champions.

=== Atlantic Championships ===
In 2009 she won the singles bronze medal at the Atlantic Bowls Championships and in 2015 she won the singles silver medal at the Atlantic Bowls Championships.

=== Dutch title National Championships Singles ===
- Indoor: 2011, 2012, 2014, 2015, 2016, 2018, 2019, 2021, 2022, 2023, 2024, 2025
- Outdoor: 2007, 2008, 2009, 2010, 2012, 2015, 2018
- Other disciplines indoor: 8
- Other disciplines outdoor: 14

=== European Championships ===
Llandrindod Wells (Wales) 2026:

- Gold medal single
- Bronze medal pairs with Ineke Spangenberg

https://bowlseurope.com/semi-finals-finals-22-september/

https://bowlseurope.com/semi-finals-and-finals-26-september/
