= European Bowls Championships =

European lawn bowls event

Tournament information
- Sport: Lawn bowls
- Location: Europe
- Established: 1997
- Administrator: Bowls Europe Ltd
- Website: Bowls Europe

The European Bowls Championship formerly the European Bowls Team Championships is a biennial continental lawn bowls tournament for European nations. From its inauguration in 1997 until September 2021, the tournament was organised by the European Bowls Union (EBU).

In September 2021, the members of what was the "European Bowls Union" (E.B.U.) voted unanimously, to rebrand and be replaced by the newly formed, limited company, Bowls Europe Ltd (registered in Scotland). The competition now features the traditional four disciplines of singles, pairs, triples and fours.

== History ==
The tournament was established to enable smaller countries in Europe to participate competitively against other more established bowls playing countries maintaining the principal aim, of fostering and developing the sport of lawn bowls throughout Europe.

The first championship was held in 1997, with financial help from the Guernsey Tourist Board. The format of the championship in 1997, was a team event consisting of two sets of mixed pairs from each country competing. In addition, there was a men's and women's singles event, with the winners of each meeting in the Champion of champions match. In 1999, singles and mixed pairs were played as part of the team event.

== Participating nations ==
There are currently 19 member nations affiliated to Bowls Europe.

- Cyprus
- Czech Republic
- England
- France
- Germany
- Guernsey
- Hungary
- Ireland
- Isle of Man
- Israel
- Jersey
- Netherlands
- Portugal
- Scotland
- Spain
- Sweden
- Switzerland
- Turkey
- Wales

== Championship Medalists ==
Year	Host	Event	Gold	Silver	Bronze
European Team Bowls Championship - European Bowls Union (EBU).
1997	Saint Peter Port, Guernsey	Men's singles	(England) John Bell	Gary McCloy	(Scotland) George Adrain / (Scotland) David Gourlay
1997	Saint Peter Port, Guernsey	Women's singles	(Wales) Judith Wason	Margaret Johnston	(Spain) Pam Cole / (Spain) Crystal Toleman
1997	Saint Peter Port, Guernsey	Champion of champions	(England) John Bell	(Wales) Judith Wason	not awarded
1997	Saint Peter Port, Guernsey	Team champions (mixed pairs)	Gary McCloy; Noel Graham; Margaret Johnston; Dorothy Kane	(Wales); Will Thomas; Dai Wilkins; Ann Dainton; Judith Wason	(Scotland); David Gourlay; George Adrain; Sarah Gourlay; Joyce Lindores
1999	Les Creux BC, Jersey	Team champions (singles & mixed pairs)	(Scotland); Gary Mackie; David Peacock; Julie Forrest; Joyce Lindores	(England); Mervyn King; Alan Prew; Norma Shaw; Mary Price	Gary McCloy; Noel Graham; Margaret Johnston; Dorothy Kane
2001	Les Creux BC, Jersey	Team champions (singles & mixed pairs)	(Scotland); Gary Mackie; David Peacock; Betty Forsyth; Sandra Steven	(Wales); Ian Slade; Richard Bowen; Ann Dainton; Shirley King	McCloy; Myles Greenfield; Margaret Johnston; Donna McNally
2001	Les Creux BC, Jersey	Individual award	(Scotland) Sandra Steven	Gary McCloy	(England) David Holt
2003	Vilamoura BC, Portugal	Team champions (singles & mixed pairs)	(England); Jayne Christie	(Israel); Raymond Sher; Ruthie Gilor	
2005	Vilamoura BC, Portugal	Team champions (singles & mixed pairs)	(Scotland); Colin Peacock; Anna Watson	(England); Catherine Popple; Liz Smerdon	Martin McHugh; Neil Booth; Margaret Johnston; Barbara Cameron
2005	Vilamoura BC, Portugal	Individual award	(England) Catherine Popple		(Guernsey) Alison Merrien
2007	Athena Beach, Cyprus	Team champions	(England); Nick Brett; Simon Skelton; Catherine Popple; Mo Monkton	(Scotland); Iain McLean; Grant Logan; Lynn Stein; Caroline Brown	(Spain); Nick Cole; Jackie Breslin; Pam Cole; Maggie Lawley
2007	Athena Beach, Cyprus	Individual award	(England) Catherine Popple	(Scotland) Iain McLean	(Scotland) Lynn Stein
2007	Athena Beach, Cyprus	Men's singles	(Scotland) Iain McLean	(England) Nick Brett (England) Simon Skelton	Not awarded
2007	Athena Beach, Cyprus	Women's singles	(England) Catherine Popple	(Scotland) Lynn Stein	(England) Mo Monkton
2009	Athena Beach, Cyprus	Team champions	(Scotland); Colin Peacock; Jim Gilrut; Lynn Stein; Michelle Cooper	(England); Nick Brett; Simon Skelton; Sue Davies; Mo Monkton	(Guernsey); Matt Le Ber; Garry Collins; Alison Merrien; Lucy Beere
2009	Athena Beach, Cyprus	Individual award	(Jersey) Cyril Renouf	(Guernsey) Lucy Beere	(Scotland) Colin Peacock
2009	Athena Beach, Cyprus	Men's singles	(Jersey) Cyril Renouf	(Scotland) Colin Peacock	(England) Nick Brett
2009	Athena Beach, Cyprus	Women's singles	(Guernsey) Lucy Beere	(Cyprus) Linda Ryan	(Scotland) Lynn Stein
2009	Athena Beach, Cyprus	Mixed pairs	{{}}	(Guernsey); Garry Collins; Alison Merrien	{{}}
2011	Portugal; Vilamoura BC	Men's Pairs	Wales; Marc Wyatt; David Harding	England; Tristan Morton; Andrew Catton	Ireland; Stephen Shields; Gary McCloy
2011	Portugal; Vilamoura BC	Ladies Pairs	Jersey; Katie Nixon; Joan Renouf	England; Lorraine Kuhler; Annalisa Bellamy	Wales; Lisa Forey; Caroline Taylor
2011	Portugal; Vilamoura BC	Mixed Pairs	Wales; Wyatt; Harding; Forey; Taylor	Scotland; Derek Oliver; Robert Grant; Susan Murray; Claire Douglas	Israel; Tzvika Hadar; Danny Slodovnik; Tami Kamzel; Ruthie Gilor
2011	Portugal; Vilamoura BC	Team Champions	Wales; Wyatt; Harding; Forey; Taylor	England; Morton; Catton; Kuhler; Bellamy	Scotland; Oliver; Grant; Murray; Douglas
2013	Spain; Emerald Isle BC; San Miguel BC	Men's Pairs	Scotland; Colin Walker; Derek Oliver	Wales; Roger Jones; Wayne Griffiths	Ireland; Stephen Shields; Mark Wilson
2013	Spain; Emerald Isle BC; San Miguel BC	Ladies Pairs	Spain; Janet Dando; Lynn Greenland	England; Jamie-Lea Winch; Wendy King	Jersey; Christine Grimes; Joan Renouf
2013	Spain; Emerald Isle BC; San Miguel BC	Mixed Fours	England; Jamie Walker; Robert Paxton; Winch; King	Scotland; Walker; Oliver; Susan Murray; Lynn Stein	Spain; Pete Bonsor; Graham Cathcart; Dando; Greenland
2013	Spain; Emerald Isle BC; San Miguel BC	Team Champions	England; Walker; Paxton; Winch; King	Scotland; Walker; Oliver; Murray; Stein	Spain; Bonsor; Cathcart; Dando; Greenland
2015	Israel; Ramat Gan BC	Men's Pairs	Guernsey; Matt Solway; Matt Le Ber	Jersey; Derek Boswell; Cyril Renouf	England; Alex Walton; Ashley Caress
2015	Israel; Ramat Gan BC	Ladies Pairs	England; Rebecca Field; Amy Stanton	Netherlands; Saskia Schaft; Norma Duin	Guernsey; Jackie Nicolle; Lucy Beere
2015	Israel; Ramat Gan BC	Mixed Fours	England; Walton; Caress; Field; Stanton	Guernsey; Matt Solway; Le Ber; Nicholle; Beere	Ireland; Stuart Bennett; Aaron Tennant; Sile Garvey; Sarah-Jane Coleman
2015	Israel; Ramat Gan BC	Team Champions	England; Walton; Caress; Field; Stanton	Guernsey; Matt Solway; Le Ber; Nicholle; Beere	Netherlands; Ralph de Rooij; Frank de Vries; Schaft; Duin
2017	Jersey; Les Creux BC	Men's Pairs	Guernsey; Matt Solway; Matt Le Ber	Ireland; Andrew Kyle; Mark Wilson	Scotland; Jason Banks; Greg McLachlin
2017	Jersey; Les Creux BC	Women's Pairs	England; Jamie-Lea Winch; Rebecca Wigfield	Ireland; Catherine Beattie; Megan Wilson	Cyprus; Diane Roberts; Linda Ryan
2017	Jersey; Les Creux BC	Mixed Fours	Wales; Chris Klefenz; Chris Ashman; Bethan Russ; Emma Gittins	Ireland; Kyle; Wilson; Beattie; Wilson	Scotland; Banks; McLachlin; Emma McIntyre; Natalie Docherty
2017	Jersey; Les Creux BC	Team Champions	Ireland; Kyle; Wilson; Beattie; Wilson	Guernsey; Matt Solway; Le Ber; Jackie Nicolle; Lucy Beere	Scotland; Banks; McLachlin; Emma McIntyre; Docherty
2019	Guernsey; Vale Rec; Delancey Park; Beau Sejour	Men's Pairs	England; Andrew Walters; Tristan Morton	Scotland; Darren Weir; Connor Milne	Wales; Owain Dando; Daniel Davies
2019	Guernsey; Vale Rec; Delancey Park; Beau Sejour	Women's Pairs	Guernsey; Rose Ogier; Lucy Beere	Jersey; Kim Gallichan; Fiona Archibald	England; Devon Cooper; Katherine Rednall
2019	Guernsey; Vale Rec; Delancey Park; Beau Sejour	Mixed Fours	Guernsey; Todd Priaulx; Matt Le Ber; Ogier; Beere	France; Virgile Machado; Amaury Dumont; Olivia Four; Cindy Royet	President's Select; David Weale; John Colley; Jenny Kimber; Gwen De la Mare
2019	Guernsey; Vale Rec; Delancey Park; Beau Sejour	Team Champions	Guernsey; Priaulx; Le Ber; Ogier; Beere	Scotland; Weir; Milne; Dee Hoggan; Natalie Docherty	England; Walters; Morton; Cooper; Rednall
European Bowls Championship - Bowls Europe Ltd.
2022	Scotland; Ayr	Men's Singles	Ireland; Gary Kelly	Jersey; Michael Rive	Scotland; Mark O'Hagan
2022	Scotland; Ayr	Men's Pairs	England; Tom McGuinness; Ed Morris	Guernsey; Matt Solway; Todd Priaulx	Scotland; Jason Banks; John Fleming Jnr.
2022	Scotland; Ayr	Men's Triples	Ireland; Aaron Tennant; Gary Kelly; Mark Wilson	Scotland; Blair Davidson; Mark O'Hagan; Connor Milne	Israel; Tzvika Hadar; Selwyn Hare; Allan Saitowitz
2022	Scotland; Ayr	Men's Fours	Scotland; Blair Davidson; Jason Banks; John Fleming Jnr. Connor Milne	England; Tom McGuinness; Ed Morris; Lee Calver; Harry Goodwin	Ireland; Aaron Tennant; Stuart Bennett; Stephen Kirkwood; Mark Wilson
2022	Scotland; Ayr	Women's Singles	England; Stef Branfield	Scotland; Emma Mcintyre	Israel; Ruthie Gilor
2022	Scotland; Ayr	Women's Pairs	England; Emma Cooper; Stef Branfield	Ireland; Sarah Kelly; Shauna O'Neil	Scotland; Emma Mcintyre; Rachael Sinclair
2022	Scotland; Ayr	Women's Triples	Ireland; Ashleigh Rainey; Lara Reaney; Chloe Wilson	England; Ruby Hill; Laura Holden; Lorraine Kuhler	Scotland; Kimbereley Dodds; Dawn Anderson; Megan Grantham
2022	Scotland; Ayr	Women's Fours	Scotland; Kimbereley Dodds; Dawn Anderson; Megan Grantham; Rachael Sinclair	Jersey; Kim Gallichan; Gina de Long; Rachael MacDonald; Megan Kivlin	England; Emma Cooper; Ruby Hill; Laura Holden; Lorraine Kuhler
2024	Scotland; Ayr	2024 European Bowls Championships			
2026	Wales; Llandrindod Wells	2026 European Bowls Championships			
