= World Bowls Indoor Championships =

Bowls event

Tournament information
- Sport: indoor bowls
- Location: Various
- Established: 2019
- Administrator: World Bowls and IIBC
- Website: World Bowls

The World Bowls Indoor Championships is bowls event inaugurated in 2019 by the organisations known as World Bowls and the International Indoor Bowls Council (IIBC). It is contested annually between bowlers from national bowls organisations. The competition is the rival event to the World Bowls Tour's blue riband event called the World Indoor Bowls Championships.

In 2019, World Bowls came to an agreement with the IIBC (formerly the WIBC). The agreement was to merge their two international indoor championships, the World Cup Singles and the IIBC Championships. The new event would be called the World Bowls Indoor Championships. The event was due to start on 20 April 2020 but due to the COVID-19 pandemic it was unable to be held until 2022.

The Championships feature men's and women's singles and mixed pairs.

== Past winners ==
Year	Venue	Men's singles	Women's singles	Mixed pairs
2022	County of Bristol IBC, England	(Scotland) Michael Stepney	(Scotland) Julie Forrest	(Scotland) Stewart Anderson & (Guernsey) Alison Merrien MBE
2023	Warilla B&RC, Australia	(Australia) Aron Sherriff	(Scotland) Julie Forrest	(Australia) Aron Sherriff & (Australia) Kelsey Cottrell
2024	Guernsey IB Centre, Guernsey	(Guernsey) Jason Greenslade	(Malaysia) Nor Farah Ain Abdullah	(Australia) Ray Pearse & (Australia) Samantha Atkinson
2025	Aberdeen IBC, Scotland	(Australia) Jack McShane	(Scotland) Sophie McGrouther	(England) Dominic McVittie & (England) Emily Kernick
2026	Ocean Grove, Victoria, Australia	(Wales) Iain McLean	(Guernsey) Alison Merrien MBE	(Australia) Corey Wedlock & (Australia) Kelsey Cottrell
