= 2016 US Open Lawn Bowls Championship =

Bowls USA 2016 US Open
- 39th US Outdoor Bowls Championships
- Location: Sarasota Florida, United States
- Date: November 12–19, 2016
- Category: Bowls USA 2016 US Open

The 2016 US Open Lawn Bowls Championship was held at Sarasota Lawn Bowling Club, Florida, United States, in November 2016.

== Winners ==
Event	Winner
Men's pairs 1 st	(England) Garry Watts & (England) Rae Ney
Men's pairs 2 nd	(Scotland) Alin Lozada & (England) Alin Lozada
Men's pairs 3 rd	(Israel) George Kaminsky & (Israel) Derek Boswell
Men's pairs 4 th	(United States) Marcus Zeino & (United States) Bill Ashley

=== Open men's pairs ===
First round
1	(Scotland) Paul Foster & (Scotland) Alex Marshall	9	7
(Northern Ireland) Gary Kelly	5	5
16	(England) Mark Dawes	9	10
(Australia) Jamie Smith	2	2
8	(England) Mervyn King	7	7
(Wales) Stephen Harris	6	7
9	(Canada) David Jefferie&Americo Silvestro	12
(United States) Marcus Zeino & Bill Ashley	22
4	(England) Robert Paxton	9	8
(England) Robert Chisholm	3	4
13	(England) Mark Royal	8	10
(United States) Neil Furman	3	2
5	(England) Andy Thomson	5	9	1
(England) Connor Cinato	8	6	2
12	(Wales) Jason Greenslade	8	3	1
(England) Jamie Chestney	7	8	2
3	(Scotland) Paul Foster	9	3	1
(England) Matthew Orrey	1	9	2
14	(Wales) John Price	10	4	1
(England) Simon Skelton	5	9	2
6	(Scotland) David Gourlay	7	10
(England) Gary R Smith	6	6
11	(Scotland) Jonathan Ross	3	10	2
(Scotland) Ryan Clark	8	3	0
2	(England) Nick Brett	12	8
(England) Jamie Rippey	3	4
15	(England) Les Gillett	10	4	2
(England) Jason Parkinson	5	7	1
7	(Scotland) Darren Burnett	8	7
(Scotland) Colin Walker	7	2
10	(England) Greg Harlow	9	7
(Scotland) Ronnie Duncan	4	7

Second round
1	(Scotland) Marshall	7	7	2
16	(England) Dawes	7	7	1
8	(Canada) Andre Bessette & Terry Taylor	14
9	(United States) Marcus Zeino & Bill Ashley	21
4	(England) Paxton	6	12	2
13	(England) Royal	7	5	0
(England) Cinato	3	3
(England) Chestney	10	8
(England) Orrey	7	7	2
(England) Skelton	10	6	1
6	(Scotland) Gourlay	7	9
11	(Scotland) Ross	2	4
2	(England) Brett	9	8
15	(England) Gillett	4	5
7	(Scotland) Burnett	4	6
10	(England) Harlow	9	6

Quarter-finals
1	(Scotland) George Whitelaw & John Dunn	17
9	(United States) Marcus Zeino & Bill Ashley	23
4	(England) Paxton	7	7
(England) Chestney	3	7
(England) Orrey	3	4
6	(Scotland) Gourlay	9	5
2	(England) Brett	9	7
10	19

Semi-finals
1	(United States) Marcus Zeino & Bill Ashley	17
4	(England) Garry Watts & Rae Ney	19
Final
(England) Garry Watts & Rae Ney VS (Scotland) Alin Lozada & Alin Lozadal
(United States) Marcus Zeino & Bill Ashley VS (Israel) George Kaminsky & Derek Boswell
6	(Scotland) Gourlay	7	6	0
2	(England) Brett	6	7	2
