= 2013 World Indoor Bowls Championship =

Bowls championship held in Great Yarmouth, Norfolk

World Indoor Championships 2013
- 35th World Indoor Bowls Championships
- Location: (England) Great Yarmouth, Norfolk
- Date(s): January, 2013.
- Category: World Indoor Championships

The 2013 World Indoor Bowls Championship was held at Potters Leisure Resort, Hopton-on-Sea, Great Yarmouth, England, in January 2013.

The event was sponsored by Fred. Olsen Cruise Lines and was the 35th annual World Indoor Bowls Championships. The men's singles title was won by Stewart Anderson, while the ladies singles was won by Rebecca Field.

The 2013 tournament saw the introduction of the shot clock, used for the first time at the World Championships. It was previously trialled at the 2012 Scottish International Open and has been used in Australia. Each player is allowed 30 seconds to play their shot, and if they run out of time, the hooter will sound and their bowl is removed. However, players can use up to four time-outs in a match - which resets the clock to 60 seconds - and are given an extra time-out if the match goes to a tie-break set.

== Winners ==
Event	Winner
Men's Singles	(Scotland) Stewart Anderson
Women's Singles	(England) Rebecca Field
Open Pairs	(Scotland) Paul Foster & (Scotland) Alex Marshall
Mixed Pairs	(Scotland) Paul Foster & (Wales) Laura Thomas

== Draw and results ==
=== Men's singles ===
==== Finals ====
Semi-finals
9	(Scotland) Anderson	5	9
4	(Scotland) Gourlay	5	4
(Scotland) Walker	5	8	0
3	(Scotland) Foster	7	4	2

Final
9	(Scotland) Anderson	10	10
3	(Scotland) Foster	10	9

==== Top half ====
First round
1	(England) Andy Thomson	8	3
(New Zealand) Phil Bennett	8	8
16	(England) Nick Brett	5	12	2
(Wales) Robert Chisholm	7	6	1
9	(Scotland) Stewart Anderson	8	9
(England) Mark Dawes	8	5
8	(England) Simon Skelton	8	5
(Scotland) Steve Allan	8	7
4	(Scotland) David Gourlay	9	9
(Australia) Kelvin Kerkow	6	5
13	(Scotland) Alex Marshall	9	9
(England) Scott Edwards	8	6
5	(Scotland) Darren Burnett	5	6
(Northern Ireland) Clifford Craig	12	10
12	(Wales) John Price	8	8
(England) Jamie Chestney	5	4

Second round
(New Zealand) Bennett	4	3
16	(England) Brett	9	7
9	(Scotland) Anderson	7	3	2
(Scotland) Allan	6	9	1
4	(Scotland) Gourlay	9	12
13	(Scotland) Marshall	4	1
(Northern Ireland) Craig	5	4
12	(Wales) Price	8	8

Quarter-finals
16	(England) Brett	4	7	1
9	(Scotland) Anderson	9	6	2
4	(Scotland) Gourlay	11	12
12	(Wales) Price	2	4

Semi-finals
9	(Scotland) Anderson	5	9
4	(Scotland) Gourlay	5	4

==== Bottom half ====
First round
2	(England) Greg Harlow	4	9	1
(Scotland) Colin Walker	9	3	2
15	(Wales) Robert Weale	8	4
(Australia) Ray Pearse	12	6
7	(England) Mark Royal	14	13
(South Africa) Tracy Meyeridricks	4	0
10	(England) Robert Paxton	8	4	2
(Scotland) Robert Gordon	6	7	0
3	(Scotland) Paul Foster	11	11
(Wales) Steve Harris	2	5
14	(Wales) Jason Greenslade	4	10	2
(England) Bill Jackson	9	1	1
6	(England) Mervyn King	9	12
(England) Les Gillett	6	3
11	(Scotland) Jonathan Ross	12	7	2
(England) Pat Briscoe	7	8	1

Second round
(Scotland) Walker	10	2	2
(Australia) Pearse	4	8	1
7	(England) Royal	10	7	0
10	(England) Paxton	3	8	2
3	(Scotland) Foster	10	10
14	(Wales) Greenslade	3	4
6	(England) King	7	4	2
11	(Scotland) Ross	6	14	1

Quarter-finals
(Scotland) Walker	7	7
10	(England) Paxton	6	7
3	(Scotland) Foster	11	9
6	(England) King	3	5

Semi-finals
(Scotland) Walker	5	8	0
3	(Scotland) Foster	7	4	2

=== Women's singles ===
First round
(England) Rebecca Field	5	10	2
(Wales) Laura Thomas	9	5	0
(Wales) Kerry Packwood	4	13	2
(England) Debbie Stavrou	9	5	0
(Australia) Karen Murphy	10	5	0
(Wales) Kelly Packwood	3	9	2
(Guernsey) Alison Merrien	9	6	2
(England) Ellen Falkner	4	7	1

Semi-finals
(England) Field	8	8
(Wales) Kerry Packwood	7	7
(Wales) Kelly Packwood	6	1
(Guernsey) Merrien	7	11

Final
(England) Field	11	8	2
(Guernsey) Merrien	7	10	1

=== Open Pairs ===
First round
1	(Scotland) Paul Foster (Scotland) Alex Marshall
bye
(England) Andy Thomson (England) Mark Royal	11	8
(England) Scott Edwards (England) Leigh Prince	2	6
(England) Simon Skelton (England) Mervyn King	9	16
(Wales) Gareth Rees (Wales) Gavin Rees	4	0
4	(England) Robert Paxton (Scotland) David Gourlay
bye
(England) Billy Jackson (Wales) John Price	10	2	2
(Northern Ireland) John McCullough (Northern Ireland) Roy Battersby	3	8	0
2	(England) Greg Harlow (England) Nick Brett
bye
(Wales) Robert Weale (Wales) Jason Greenslade	9	11
(Scotland) Graeme Donaldson (Scotland) Colin Walker	4	7
3	(Scotland) Darren Burnett (Scotland) Stewart Anderson
bye

Quarter-finals
1	(Scotland) Foster (Scotland) Marshall	6	11	2
(England) Thomson (England) Royal	9	3	1
(England) Skelton (England) King	10	6
4	(Scotland) Gourlay (England) Paxton	0	6
(England) Jackson (Wales) Price	2	4
2	(England) Harlow (England) Brett	8	8
(Wales) Greenslade (Wales) Weale	5	4
3	(Scotland) Burnett (Scotland) Anderson	8	13

Semi-finals
1	(Scotland) Foster (Scotland) Marshall	5	8	2
(England) King (England) Skelton	7	7	1
2	(England) Harlow (England) Brett	5	5
3	(Scotland) Burnett (Scotland) Anderson	7	9

Final
1	(Scotland) Foster (Scotland) Marshall	9	7	2
3	(Scotland) Burnett (Scotland) Anderson	7	8	1

=== Mixed Pairs ===
Quarter-finals
(England) Mervyn King (Guernsey) Alison Merrien	13	7	2
(Scotland) David Gourlay (England) Debbie Stavrou	8	10	1
(Scotland) Darren Burnett (Australia) Karen Murphy	9	6
(England) Andy Thomson (England) Ellen Falkner	4	6
(Scotland) Paul Foster (Wales) Laura Thomas	5	8	2
(England) Simon Skelton (Wales) Kelly Packwood	6	5	1
(England) Mark Royal (Wales) Kerry Packwood	7	2	2
(England) Greg Harlow (England) Rebecca Field	2	10	1

Semi-finals
(England) King (Guernsey) Merrien	3	13	1
(Scotland) Burnett (Australia) Murphy	8	3	2
(Scotland) Foster (Wales) Thomas	9	11
(England) Royal (Wales) Packwood	1	3

Final
(Scotland) Burnett (Australia) Murphy	5	6
(Scotland) Foster (Wales) Thomas	12	10
