= 2012 World Indoor Bowls Championship =

Bowls championship held in Great Yarmouth, Norfolk

World Indoor Championships 2012
- 34th World Indoor Bowls Championships
- Location: (England) Great Yarmouth, Norfolk
- Date(s): January, 2012.
- Category: World Indoor Championships

The 2012 World Indoor Bowls Championship was held at Potters Leisure Resort, Hopton on Sea, Great Yarmouth, England, in January 2012.

== Winners ==
Event	Winner
Men's Singles	(England) Andy Thomson
Women's Singles	(Australia) Karen Murphy
Open Pairs	(Scotland) Paul Foster & (Scotland) Alex Marshall
Mixed Pairs	(Scotland) David Gourlay & (England) Debbie Stavrou

== Draw and results ==
=== Men's singles ===
==== Finals ====
Semi-finals
8	(Scotland) David Gourlay	4	2
13	(Wales) Jason Greenslade	9	8
3	(Scotland) Darren Burnett	8	5	1
10	(England) Andy Thomson	6	10	2

Final
13	(Wales) Greenslade	4	9
10	(England) Thomson	11	10

==== Top half ====
First round
1	(Scotland) Paul Foster	9	5
(Wales) Ross Owen	9	7
16	(Wales) John Price	9	9
(England) Brett Arkley	0	6
9	(Scotland) Jonathan Ross	7	10
(England) Ian Bond	2	0
8	(Scotland) David Gourlay	6	8
(Scotland) Colin Walker	6	5
4	(England) Mark Royal	10	9
(Scotland) Paul Boyd	5	4
13	(Wales) Jason Greenslade	7	11
(England) Neil Smith	5	2
5	(England) Mervyn King	4	3
(Scotland) Wayne Hogg	10	8
12	(Scotland) Stewart Anderson	7	11	2
(Australia) Tony Wood	10	1	0

Second round
(Wales) Owen	5	8	1
16	(Wales) Price	11	5	2
9	(Scotland) Ross	3	5
8	(Scotland) Gourlay	9	7
4	(England) Royal	7	11	1
13	(Wales) Greenslade	10	5	2
(Scotland) Hogg	7	6	2
12	(Scotland) Anderson	6	12	1

Quarter-finals
16	(Wales) Price	3	3
8	(Scotland) Gourlay	8	11
13	(Wales) Greenslade	7	8
(Scotland) Hogg	5	6

Semi-finals
8	(Scotland) Gourlay	4	2
13	(Wales) Greenslade	9	8

==== Bottom half ====
First round
2	(England) Greg Harlow	6	9	2
(England) David Bolt	8	3	0
15	(England) Nick Brett	12	9
(Republic of Ireland) Simon Martin	1	3
7	(Scotland) Alex Marshall	5	10	0
(South Africa) Craig Rimmington	8	2	2
10	(England) Andy Thomson	8	4	2
(Australia) Brett Wilkie	4	10	1
3	(Scotland) Darren Burnett	10	7
(England) Tim Stone	5	6
14	(England) Billy Jackson	6	0
(England) Robert Paxton	10	14
6	(England) Simon Skelton	8	10
(England) Philip Last	6	6
11	(Wales) Robert Weale	9	9
(Hong Kong) Cy Wong	4	5

Second round
2	(England) Harlow	6	9	1
15	(England) Brett	10	7	2
(South Africa) Rimmington	1	3
10	(England) Thomson	11	11
3	(Scotland) Burnett	9	0	2
(England) Paxton	7	13	0
6	(England) Skelton	4	7
11	(Wales) Weale	7	8

Quarter-finals
15	(England) Brett	11	5	1
10	(England) Thomson	6	9	2
3	(Scotland) Burnett	7	8
11	(Wales) Weale	7	7

Semi-finals
10	(England) Thomson	6	10	2
3	(Scotland) Burnett	8	5	1

=== Women's singles ===
First round
(England) Rebecca Field	10	7
(Scotland) Julie Forrest	6	7
(Australia) Karen Murphy	9	14
(England) Janice Gower	5	4
(England) Debbie Stavrou	8	4	2
(Wales) Kerry Packwood	6	9	0
(Guernsey) Alison Merrien	5	7
(England) Amy Stanton	4	5

Semi-finals
(England) Field	6	10	1
(Australia) Murphy	8	4	2
(England) Stavrou	9	9
(Guernsey) Merrien	3	8

Final
(Australia) Murphy	4	7	2
(England) Stavrou	10	6	1

=== Open Pairs ===
First round
1	(Scotland) Paul Foster & (Scotland) Alex Marshall
bye
(Wales) Daniel Salmon & (Wales) Neil Collett	6	8
(England) Mervyn King & (England) Simon Skelton	3	6
4	(England) Mark Royal & (England) Andy Thomson
bye
(Wales) John Price & (Scotland) Jonathan Ross	7	10
(England) Ian Bond & (England) Luke Harwood	6	1
(Wales) Robert Weale & (Wales) Jason Greenslade	12	12
(Scotland) Colin Walker & (Scotland) Ronnie Duncan	6	3
3	(Scotland) Darren Burnett & (Scotland) Stewart Anderson
bye
(Australia) Ben Twist & (Australia) Karen Murphy	10	10
(Scotland) David Gourlay & (England) Billy Jackson	3	7
2	(England) Greg Harlow & (England) Nick Brett
bye

Quarter-finals
1	(Scotland) Foster & (Scotland) Marshall	5	7
(Wales) Salmon & (Wales) Collett	5	4
4	(England) Royal & (England) Thomson	5	13	2
(Scotland) Ross & (Wales) Price	7	3	0
(Wales) Weale & (Wales) Greenslade	8	8
3	(Scotland) Burnett & (Scotland) Anderson	3	4
2	(England) Harlow & (England) Brett	6	8	2
(Australia) Twist & (Australia) Murphy	7	3	0

Semi-finals
1	(Scotland) Foster & (Scotland) Marshall	5	7	2
4	(England) Royal & (England) Thomson	7	6	1
(Wales) Weale & (Wales) Greenslade	6	7
2	(England) Harlow & (England) Brett	5	5

Final
1	(Scotland) Foster & (Scotland) Marshall	7	11
(Wales) Weale & (Wales) Greenslade	6	1

=== Mixed Pairs ===
Quarter-finals
(Scotland) Paul Foster & (Wales) Kerry Packwood	5	9	2
(England) Mervyn King & (Australia) Karen Murphy	11	5	1
(England) Mark Royal & (England) Rebecca Field	5	5
(Scotland) Darren Burnett & (Scotland) Julie Forrest	11	6
(Scotland) David Gourlay & (England) Debbie Stavrou	7	8	2
(England) Greg Harlow & (England) Amy Stanton	9	6	0
(England) Simon Skelton & (Guernsey) Alison Merrien	7	7	2
(Scotland) Alex Marshall & (England) Janice Gower	6	8	0

Semi-finals
(Scotland) Foster & (Wales) Packwood	11	11
(Scotland) Burnett & (Scotland) Forrest	4	3
(Scotland) Gourlay & (England) Stavrou	7	7
(England) Skelton & (Guernsey) Merrien	7	2

Final
(Scotland) Foster & (Wales) Packwood	3	9	1
(Scotland) Gourlay & (England) Stavrou	9	6	2
