= 2014 World Indoor Bowls Championship =

Bowls championship held in Great Yarmouth, Norfolk

World Indoor Championships 2014
- 36th World Indoor Bowls Championships
- Location: (England) Great Yarmouth, Norfolk
- Date: January 10–25, 2014.
- Category: World Indoor Championships

The 2014 Just Retirement World Indoor Bowls Championship was held at Potters Leisure Resort, Hopton on Sea, Great Yarmouth, England, between January 10–25, 2014. It was won for the first time by Scotland's Darren Burnett. It was sponsored by Just Retirement Group. It was also notable for Shaun Williamson singing (Something Inside) So Strong before the men's singles final.

== Winners ==
Event	Winner
Men's Singles	(Scotland) Darren Burnett
Women's Singles	(England) Katherine Rednall
Open Pairs	(England) Greg Harlow & (England) Nick Brett
Mixed Pairs	(Scotland) Paul Foster & (Wales) Laura Thomas

== Draw and results ==
=== Men's singles ===
==== Finals ====
Semi-finals
8	(Scotland) Burnett	9	12
4	(England) Paxton	6	2
2	(Scotland) Foster	4	4
6	(England) King	9	12

Final
8	(Scotland) Burnett	5	10	2
6	(England) King	7	8	1

==== Top half ====
First round
1	(Scotland) Stewart Anderson	9	9
(England) Joshua Grant	5	2
16	(Wales) Robert Weale	9	3	2
(Scotland) Michael Stepney	2	8	0
8	(Scotland) Darren Burnett	9	12
(New Zealand) Bart Robertson	4	3
9	(England) Greg Harlow	8	8
(Northern Ireland) Gary Kelly	3	4
4	(England) Robert Paxton	8	12
(England) Matt Whyers	6	2
13	(Wales) Jason Greenslade	2	10	2
(England) Billy Jackson	8	5	1
5	(England) Andy Thomson	10	9
(Scotland) John Carswell	5	5
12	(Wales) John Price	12	11
(England) Jake Willgress	1	4

Second round
1	(Scotland) Anderson	10	12
16	(Wales) Weale	2	2
8	(Scotland) Burnett	10	2	2
9	(England) Harlow	5	12	1
4	(England) Paxton	8	7
13	(Wales) Greenslade	6	7
5	(England) Thomson	7	10	2
12	(Wales) Price	10	4	1

Quarter-finals
1	(Scotland) Anderson	7	3	1
8	(Scotland) Burnett	6	9	2
4	(England) Paxton	10	8
5	(England) Thomson	8	2

Semi-finals
8	(Scotland) Burnett	9	12
4	(England) Paxton	6	2

==== Bottom half ====
First round
2	(Scotland) Paul Foster	4	10	2
(Wales) Daniel Salmon	7	3	0
15	(England) Simon Skelton	7	4	1
(England) Danny Denison	5	7	2
7	(Scotland) Alex Marshall	11	8
(Scotland) Julie Forrest	2	3
10	(England) Mark Royal	3	6	0
(England) Gary R Smith	6	5	2
3	(Scotland) David Gourlay	3	8	1
(England) Les Gillett	8	3	2
14	(Scotland) Jonathan Ross	10	7	2
(Scotland) Steve Allan	7	9	0
6	(England) Mervyn King	13	11
(South Africa) Shawn Nell	2	9
11	(England) Nick Brett	w/o
(Australia) Grant Nicol

Second round
2	(Scotland) Foster	9	9
15	(England) Denison	2	3
7	(Scotland) Marshall	8	11
(England) Smith	3	6
(England) Gillett	6	4
14	(Scotland) Ross	7	8
6	(England) King	6	7	2
11	(England) Brett	7	5	1

Quarter-finals
2	(Scotland) Foster	10	5	2
7	(Scotland) Marshall	5	7	0
14	(Scotland) Ross	8	3
6	(England) King	10	7

Semi-finals
2	(Scotland) Foster	4	4
6	(England) King	9	12

=== Women's singles ===
First round
(Guernsey) Alison Merrien	7	12
(Australia) Karen Murphy	7	3
(England) Katherine Rednall	6	12
(England) Eleanor Gass	5	3
(England) Rebecca Field	11	7	2
(England) Victoria Bilson	4	9	1
(Scotland) Julie Forrest	8	10
(England) Janice Gower	7	9

Semi-finals
(Guernsey) Merrien	5	4
(England) Rednall	11	8
(England) Field	7	8
(Scotland) Forrest	2	3

Final
(England) Rednall	14	11
(England) Field	4	3

=== Open pairs ===
First round
1	(Scotland) Paul Foster & Alex Marshall
bye
(Scotland) Darren Burnett & Stewart Anderson	7	15
(Wales) Robert Chisholm & Ross Owen	6	1
(Wales) John Price & Jason Greenslade	5	7	2
(England) Tom Bishop & Michael Cheeseman	6	4	1
4	(England) Robert Paxton & Simon Skelton
bye
(England) Greg Harlow & Nick Brett	13	8
(Scotland) Michael Stepney & Andrew Barker	1	6
2	(Scotland) David Gourlay & (England) Mervyn King
bye
(Wales) Robert Weale & (Scotland) Jonathan Ross	3	7	2
(Australia) Steve Hamai & Jason Carpenter	8	4	1
3	(England) Andy Thomson & Mark Royal
bye

Quarter-finals
1	(Scotland) Foster & Marshall	9	12
(Scotland) Burnett & Anderson	6	4
(Wales) Price & Greenslade	10	8
4	(England) Paxton & Skelton	4	6
(England) Harlow & Brett	8	9
2	(Scotland) Gourlay & (England) King	5	3
(Wales) Weale & (Scotland) Ross	7	8	2
3	(England) Thomson & Royal	9	7	0

Semi-finals
1	(Scotland) Foster & Marshall	11	10
(Wales) Price & Greenslade	5	5
(England) Harlow & Brett	11	8
(Scotland) Ross & (Wales) Weale	2	4

Final
1	(Scotland) Foster & Marshall	4	7
(England) Harlow & Brett	13	7

=== Mixed pairs ===
Quarter-finals
(Scotland) Paul Foster & (Wales) Laura Thomas	10	10
(England) Mervyn King & (England) Rebecca Field	4	6
(Scotland) David Gourlay & (England) Eleanor Gass	6	9
(England) Robert Paxton & (England) Victoria Bilson	6	4
(England) Andy Thomson & (England) Katherine Rednall	3	13	2
(Scotland) Alex Marshall & (Guernsey) Alison Merrien	9	1	1
(England) Greg Harlow & (England) Janice Gower	10	9
(Scotland) Darren Burnett & (Australia) Karen Murphy	4	3

Semi-finals
(Scotland) Foster & (Wales) Thomas	7	9
(Scotland) Gourlay & (England) Gass	6	1
(England) Thomson & Rednall	8	6	2
(England) Harlow & Gower	7	7	1

Final
(Scotland) Foster & (Wales) Thomas	10	11
(England) Thomson & Rednall	8	3
