= World Bowls Tour Awards =

- Country: United Kingdom
- Presented by: World Bowls Tour (WBT)
- First award: 2008
- Website: World Bowls Tour (WBT)

The World Bowls Tour Awards are the annual awards ceremony hosted by the World Bowls Tour to recognise the achievements of the bowls players who compete on the World Bowls Tour (WBT). The annual event is usually held in January, which take place just before the World Indoor Bowls Championships begins. The annual World Bowls Tour Hall of Fame induction happens at the annual awards ceremony too, which was launched along with the inaugural World Bowls Tour Awards ceremony in 2008.

== Winners ==
Year	Awards	Winner	Ref
2008	WBT Player of the Year; Players' Player of the Year; Young Player of the Year; Performance of the Year; Lifetime Achievement Award; WBT Hall of Fame inductees	(Scotland) Alex Marshall (Scotland) Paul Foster (England) Jamie Chestney (Scotland) Paul Foster (England) The Potters Resort (Scotland) Richard Corsie (England) Tony Allcock (Scotland) Paul Foster (England) David Bryant (Scotland) Alex Marshall	
2009	WBT Player of the Year; Players' Player of the Year; Fans' Player of the Year; Young Player of the Year; Performance of the Year; Best Qualifying Performance; Shot of the Year; Lifetime Achievement Award; Services to Bowls Award; WBT Hall of Fame inductee	(Scotland) Alex Marshall (England) Mark Royal (England) Greg Harlow (England) Andrew Walters (England) Mark Royal (Scotland) Darren Burnett (England) Simon Skelton (England) Wynne Richards (England) Nigel Oldfield (England) Andy Thomson	
2010	WBT Player of the Year; Players' Player of the Year; Fans' Player of the Year; Young Player of the Year; Performance of the Year; Best Qualifying Performance; Shot of the Year; Lifetime Achievement Award; Services to Bowls Award; WBT Hall of Fame inductee	(Scotland) Paul Foster (Scotland) Paul Foster (England) Mervyn King (Wales) Robert Chisholm (England) Billy Jackson (Scotland) Stewart Anderson (England) Ian Bond (England) Ken Fawcett / (Wales) John Price (Wales) David Rhys Jones (Scotland) David Gourlay	
2011	WBT Player of the Year; Players' Player of the Year; Fans' Player of the Year; Young Player of the Year; Performance of the Year; Best Qualifying Performance; Shot of the Year; Four Touchers; Lifetime Achievement award Services to Bowls Award; Unsung Heroes Award	(England) Mervyn King (England) Mervyn King (England) Greg Harlow (Scotland) Stuart Anderson (Scotland) Stuart Anderson (England) Robert Paxton (England) Robert Paxton (England) Robert Paxton (England) Andy Thomson (England) Dales Sports Surfaces (England) Anglia Bowls Stewards	
2012	WBT Player of the Year; Players' Player of the Year; Fans' Player of the Year; Best Qualifying Performance; Shot of the Year	(Scotland) Paul Foster (Scotland) Paul Foster (England) Greg Harlow (England) Robert Paxton (Scotland) Paul Foster	
2013	WBT Player of the Year; Players' Player of the Year; Fans' Player of the Year; Performance of the Year; Shot of the Year; Lifetime Achievement Award; Service to Bowls Award; WBT Hall of Fame inductee	(England) Andy Thomson (England) Andy Thomson (Scotland) Paul Foster (Scotland) Paul Foster (Scotland) Paul Foster (Scotland) Anne Dunwoodie (Scotland) Sandra McLeish (Guernsey) Alison Merrien	
2014	Fans' Player of the Year; Performance of the Year; Lifetime Achievement Award	(Scotland) Alex Marshall (Scotland) Alex Marshall (Scotland) Willie Wood	
2015	WBT Player of the Year; Players’ Player of the Year; Young Bowler of the Year; Match of the Year; Performance of the Year; Best Qualifying Performance; Four Touchers; Lifetime Achievement Award; Services to Bowls Award	(England) Nick Brett (England) Nick Brett (England) Katherine Rednall (England) Nick Brett vs (England) Mervyn King (Scotland) Darren Burnett (England) Billy Jackson (Scotland) Jonathan Ross (Scotland) David Gourlay (England) Mark Hedges	
2016	Player of the Year; Players Player of the Year; Young Player of the Year; Performance of the Year; Match of the Year; Best European Qualifying Performance; Best Overseas Qualifying Performance; Lifetime Achievement; Services to Bowls	(England) Nick Brett (England) Nick Brett (England) Connor Cinato (Scotland) Alex Marshall (Scotland) David Gourlay vs (England) Andy Thomson (England) Jamie Chestney (United States) Neil Furman (Scotland) Sandra McLeish (England) John Taylor	
2017	Player of the Year; Players Player of the Year; Young Player of the Year; Performance of the Year; Match of the Year; Best European Qualifying Performance; Best Overseas Qualifying Performance; WBT Hall of Fame inductee Services to Bowls	(England) Nick Brett (England) Nick Brett (Wales) Joseph Mower (Scotland) David Gourlay (England) Nick Brett vs (Scotland) Stewart Anderson (England) Trevor Taylor (New Zealand) Murray Glassey (Scotland) Darren Burnett (Scotland) Dewars Centre & Perth Indoor Bowls Club	
2018	Player of the Year; Players Player of the Year; Young Player of the Year; Performance of the Year; Match of the Year; Best European Qualifying Performance; Best Overseas Qualifying Performance; WBT Hall of Fame inductee Lifetime Achievement Award	(Scotland) Paul Foster (England) Jamie Chestney (Australia) Ellen Ryan (England) Jamie Chestney (England) Mark Dawes vs (Scotland) Stewart Anderson (Northern Ireland) Graham McKee (New Zealand) Gary Pickering (Wales) John Price (Wales) David Rhys Jones	
2019	Player of the Year; Players Player of the Year; Performance of the Year; Match of the Year; Best European Qualifying Performance; Best Overseas Qualifying Performance; WBT Hall of Fame inductee Lifetime Achievement Award; Services to Bowls	(Scotland) David Gourlay (England) Mark Dawes (Scotland) Michael Stepney (Scotland) Michael Stepney vs (Scotland) Paul Foster (Scotland) Colin Walker (United States) Dan LeMessurier (England) Greg Harlow (Scotland) Alex Marshall (England) Janice Gower	
