= 2011 World Indoor Bowls Championship =

Bowls championship held in Great Yarmouth, Norfolk

World Indoor Championships 2011
- 33rd World Indoor Bowls Championships
- Location: (England) Great Yarmouth, Norfolk
- Date: 5 – 23 January 2011.
- Category: World Indoor Championships

The 2011 World Indoor Bowls Championship was held at Potters Leisure Resort, Hopton on Sea, Great Yarmouth, England, from 5 to 23 January 2011.

== Winners ==
Event	Winner
Men's Singles	(Scotland) Paul Foster
Women's Singles	(Guernsey) Alison Merrien
Open Pairs	(Scotland) Paul Foster & (Scotland) Alex Marshall
Mixed Pairs	(England) Simon Skelton & (Guernsey) Alison Merrien

== Draw and results ==
=== Men's singles ===
==== Finals ====
Semi-finals
1	(England) Harlow	6	7	1
4	(Scotland) Marshall	9	5	2
2	(Scotland) Foster	10	9
3	(England) Royal	3	2

Final
4	(Scotland) Marshall	5	8
2	(Scotland) Foster	11	8

==== Top half ====
First round
1	(England) Greg Harlow	7	13
(Northern Ireland) Gary Kelly	4	3
16	(Wales) John Price	6	8
(Wales) John Roberts	6	5
8	(England) Mervyn King	10	5
(Scotland) John Candlish	4	5
9	(England) Billy Jackson	2	8	0
(England) Brett Arkley	9	7	2
4	(Scotland) Alex Marshall	9	11
(England) Glenn Skipp	4	3
13	(Scotland) David Gourlay	9	8	1
(England) Tim Stone	8	10	2
5	(England) Simon Skelton	8	11
(England) Philip Last	6	4
12	(Wales) Robert Weale	8	13
(South Africa) Craig Rimmington	7	1

Second round
1	(England) Harlow	10	12
16	(Wales) Price	5	3
8	(England) King	5	7
(England) Arkley	6	7
4	(Scotland) Marshall	8	4	2
(England) Stone	3	9	1
5	(England) Skelton	4	7
12	(Wales) Weale	10	9

Quarter-finals
1	(England) Harlow	13	10
(England) Arkley	4	6
4	(Scotland) Marshall	7	9	2
12	(Wales) Weale	8	1	0

Semi-finals
1	(England) Harlow	6	7	1
4	(Scotland) Marshall	9	5	2

==== Bottom half ====
First round
2	(Scotland) Paul Foster	9	8
(Scotland) Stewart Anderson	1	4
15	(Scotland) Jonathan Ross	6	9
(Australia) Barrie Lester	4	5
7	(England) Ian Bond	6	5
(England) Andrew Ware	6	8
10	(England) Andy Thomson	8	7
(England) Richard Moses	7	5
3	(England) Mark Royal	5	13
(England) Jamie Chestney	5	0
14	(Australia) Kelvin Kerkow	4	6
(England) Nick Brett	10	6
6	(Wales) Jason Greenslade	10	8
(United States) Neil Furman	5	3
11	(Scotland) Darren Burnett	7	8	2
(Scotland) Steven Glen	5	11	0

Second round
2	(Scotland) Foster	8	8
15	(Scotland) Ross	7	6
7	(England) Ware	4	9	1
10	(England) Thomson	9	5	2
3	(England) Royal	8	6
(England) Brett	3	6
6	(Wales) Greenslade	9	6	0
11	(Scotland) Burnett	8	9	2

Quarter-finals
2	(Scotland) Foster	7	2	2
10	(England) Thomson	6	11	1
3	(England) Royal	7	9	2
11	(Scotland) Burnett	8	3	0

Semi-finals
2	(Scotland) Foster	10	9
3	(England) Royal	3	2

=== Women's singles ===
First round
1	(Guernsey) Alison Merrien	9	7
8	(England) Janice Gower	3	5
4	(Scotland) Julie Forrest	9	10
5	(England) Debbie Stavrou	4	2
3	(Australia) Karen Murphy	6	10	2
6	(England) Ellen Falkner	9	4	0
2	(Wales) Kerry Packwood	10	2	2
7	(England) Carol Ashby	0	13	1

Semi-finals
(Guernsey) Merrien	8	9
(Scotland) Forrest	3	1
(Australia) Murphy	6	10	2
(Wales) Packwood	7	2	0

Final
(Guernsey) Merrien	9	0	2
(Australia) Murphy	5	11	1

=== Open Pairs ===
First round

Quarter-finals

Semi-finals

Final

(Scotland) Alex Marshall

(Scotland) Paul Foster

bye

(Scotland) Marshall

(Scotland) Foster

8
8
2

(England) Jamie Chestney

(England) Nick Brett

9
9

(England) Chestney

(England) Brett

5
9
0

(Scotland) Darren Burnett

(Northern Ireland) Jonathan Ross

6
3

(Scotland) Marshall

(Scotland) Foster

6
10

(Australia) Kelvin Kerkow

(England) Mervyn King

10
7

(Australia) Kerkow

(England) King

5
7

(Wales) Owian Dando

(Wales) Paul Williams

5
7

(Australia) Kerkow

(England) King

10
7

(England) Greg Harlow

(Wales) John Price

(England) Harlow

(Wales) Price

2
7

bye

(Scotland) Marshall

(Scotland) Foster

3
7
2

(Scotland) Andrew Barker

(Scotland) Michael Stepney

7
7

(Scotland) Stepney

(Scotland) Barker

8
3
0

(Wales) Jason Greenslade

(Wales) Robert Weale

5
7

(Scotland) Stepney

(Scotland) Baker

12
8

(England) Ian Bond

(England) Andy Thomson

(England) Bond

(England) Thomson

1
6

bye

(Scotland) Stepney

(Scotland) Barker

11
8

(England) Mark Royal

(England) Simon Skelton

(England) Royal

(England) Skelton

3
4

bye

(England) Royal

(England) Skelton

8
7

(England) Billy Jackson

(Scotland) David Gourlay

6
9

(England) Jackson

(Scotland) Gourlay

6
7

(Australia) Barrie Lester

(Australia) Jay Globits

5
8

=== Mixed Pairs ===
Quarter-finals
(England) Simon Skelton & (Guernsey) Alison Merrien	8	10
(Scotland) Alex Marshall & (England) Carol Ashby	3	3
(England) Ian Bond & (Scotland) Julie Forrest	8	10
(England) Mark Royal & (England) Janice Gower	4	2
(Scotland) Paul Foster & (England) Debbie Stavrou	11	6	0
(England) Mervyn King & (Australia) Karen Murphy	5	9	2
(Wales) Jason Greenslade & (Wales) Kerry Packwood	7	5	0
(England) Greg Harlow & (England) Ellen Falkner	5	7	2

Semi-finals
(England) Skelton & (Guernsey) Merrien	9	9
(England) Bond & (Scotland) Forrest	3	1
(England) King & (Australia) Murphy	4	5
(England) Harlow & (England) Falkner	7	5

Final
(England) Skelton & (Guernsey) Merrien	5	8	2
(England) Harlow & (England) Falkner	7	7	0
