= 2010 Welsh International Open =

The 2010 Welsh International Open was a professional bowls tournament. It was held between 30 January and 5 February 2010 at the City & County of Swansea Indoor Bowls Club, Swansea, Wales.

Darren Burnett won in the final 9-4, 9-5 against Simon Skelton.

== Seeds ==
1. (England) Robert Chisholm (first round)
2. (Scotland) Alex Marshall (second round)
3. (England) Mark Royal (second round)
4. (Scotland) Paul Foster (second round)
5. (England) Greg Harlow (first round)
6. (Scotland) David Gourlay (first round)
7. (Wales) Jason Greenslade (first round)
8. (England) Andy Thomson (first round)
9. (England) Mervyn King (quarter-finals)
10. (Wales) Robert Weale (semi-finals)
11. (England) Billy Jackson (second round)
12. (Australia) Kelvin Kerkow (first round)
13. (England) Ian Bond (quarter-finals)
14. (England) Les Gillett (first round)
15. (England) Simon Skelton (runner-up)
16. (Scotland) Darren Burnett (champion)

== Main draw ==
First Round
1	(England) Robert Chisholm	5	7
(Australia) Gerard Beath	10	7
15	(England) Simon Skelton	7	8
(England) Neil Smith	6	4
9	(England) Mervyn King	9	8
(Wales) John Roberts	4	4
6	(Scotland) David Gourlay	9	8	0
(South Africa) Bobby Donnelly	0	9	2
5	(England) Greg Harlow	0	10	1
(Israel) Zvika Hadar	9	4	2
10	(Wales) Robert Weale	9	5	2
(New Zealand) Chris Lourie	3	9	1
13	(England) Ian Bond	7	13
(Hong Kong) Osman Adem	6	1
4	(Scotland) Paul Foster	11	7
(Scotland) Gary Hutchison	1	3
3	(England) Mark Royal	6	11
(Scotland) Jamie Hanlan	6	3
12	(Australia) Kelvin Kerkow	6	4
(England) Tim Stone	7	12
14	(England) Les Gillett	4	7
(Australia) Brett Wilkie	6	11
7	(Wales) Jason Greenslade	3	5
(England) Nick Brett	10	5
8	(England) Andy Thomson	5	9	0
(Ireland) Jonathan Ross	7	6	2
11	(England) Billy Jackson	11	9
(United States) Phillip Dunn	2	4
16	(Scotland) Darren Burnett	11	8
(Canada) Hirendra Bhartu	3	3
2	(Scotland) Alex Marshall	4	8	2
(Ireland) David Corkill	9	6	0

Second Round
(Australia) Gerard Beath	5	3
15	(England) Simon Skelton	7	8
9	(England) Mervyn King	10	10
(South Africa) Bobby Donnelly	5	2
(Israel) Zvika Hadar	3	4
10	(Wales) Robert Weale	12	11
13	(England) Ian Bond	4	8	2
4	(Scotland) Paul Foster	9	3	0
3	(England) Mark Royal	3	6
(England) Tim Stone	8	12
(Australia) Brett Wilkie	10	7
(England) Nick Brett	6	3
(Ireland) Jonathan Ross	6	9
11	(England) Billy Jackson	5	6
16	(Scotland) Darren Burnett	11	2	2
2	(Scotland) Alex Marshall	3	11	1

Quarter-finals
15	(England) Simon Skelton	9	6	2
9	(England) Mervyn King	7	9	0
10	(Wales) Robert Weale	4	8	2
13	(England) Ian Bond	10	3	1
(England) Tim Stone	4	4
(Australia) Brett Wilkie	10	8
(Ireland) Jonathan Ross	7	6
16	(Scotland) Darren Burnett	8	6

Semi-finals
15	(England) Simon Skelton	10	8
10	(Wales) Robert Weale	5	2
(Australia) Brett Wilkie	5	10	1
16	(Scotland) Darren Burnett	9	2	2

Final
15	(England) Simon Skelton	4	5
16	(Scotland) Darren Burnett	9	9
