= 2007–08 World Bowls Tour =

The World Bowls Tour (WBT) is a limited company formed in September 1996 by the Professional Bowls Association, and the two major governing bodies for world flat green bowls, World Bowls and the World Indoor Bowls Council (WIBC).

The primary object of WBT is to set up a series of premier bowls events at which the top players in the world can play.

== Players ==
The top 16 players automatically entered into the four main tournaments. The rest of the players are made up of qualifiers.

The top 16 for the 2007–08 season are:

1. (Australia) David Gourlay
2. (England) Greg Harlow
3. (Scotland) Paul Foster
4. (Scotland) Alex Marshall
5. (Wales) Jason Greenslade
6. (Wales) Robert Weale
7. (England) Andy Thomson
8. (England) Mervyn King
9. (Australia) Kelvin Kerkow
10. (Republic of Ireland) Jonathan Ross
11. (England) Ian Bond
12. (England) Mark McMahon
13. (England) Mark Royal
14. (England) Billy Jackson
15. (England) Les Gillett
16. (Wales) John Price

== Calendar ==
- Co-operative Funeralcare World Matchplay 2007, Ponds Forge, Sheffield, 21–22 June 2007
- Engage International Open 2007, Ponds Forge, Sheffield, 28 October to 4 November 2007
- The Great British Mobility Group Scottish International Open 2007, Dewars, Perth, 24 November to 1 December 2007
- Potters Holidays World Indoor Bowls Championships 2007, Potters Leisure Resort, Norfolk, 7–27 January 2008
- Welsh International Open 2007, Selwyn Samuel Centre, Llanelli, Wales, 2–8 February 2008

== Events ==
The 2007–08 season saw the arrival of a new tournament, the 'Co-operative Funeralcare World Matchplay 2007'.

As well as this new event, the four main tournaments open to all the top 16 players will be played in their traditional months.

=== Co-operative Funeralcare World Matchplay 2007 ===
Greg Harlow extended his run at Ponds Forge, Sheffield to 18 games when he beat Mervyn King in the Co-operative Funeralcare World Match Play Championship.

Every game of the tournament was broadcast live on Sky Sports – the first time that the broadcaster had given the World Bowls Tour such lengthily coverage.

Harlow, 38, has won the three previous International Open's at Ponds Forge – a record that no one has managed to do.

“It's unbelievable, I don't know what it is - I just wish we could play all our WBT events here,” said an ecstatic Harlow after being asked by Sky Sports presenter Lee McKenzie to explain the secret of his success at the Sheffield venue.

==== Results ====
Semi-finals [8] Mervyn King (ENG) bt [4] Alex Marshall (SCO) 11–6, 9-7
[2] Greg Harlow (ENG) bt [6] Robert Weale (WAL) 6–5, 5-5
Final:
[2] Greg Harlow (ENG) bt [8] Mervyn King (ENG) 10–8, 4–10, 2-0

Date	Place	Event	Winner	Second	SF's	QF's
June 21 – June 22, 2007	Sheffield, England	World Matchplay 2007	(England) Greg Harlow	(England) Mervyn King	(Scotland) Alex Marshall (Wales) Robert Weale	(Australia) David Gourlay (Wales) Jason Greenslade (Scotland) Paul Foster (England) Andy Thomson

=== Engage International Open 2007 ===
The Engage International Open took place between November 10 till November 11. The competition was covered by BBC Television, who aired live coverage. Scotland's Paul Foster captured his first ever International Open title in Sheffield after winning a match tie-breaker with Jason Greenslade.
The three-time World Singles Champion from Troon notched up a maximum count of four shots on the first end before going on to take the first set 15–5.
Welshman Greenslade hit back, edging a closely fought second set 6–5.
But in the three-end tie-break, Foster won 2–1 to claim one of the few WBT ranking titles to elude him so far.
"Obviously this was an important triumph for me as it plugged a significant gap in my CV and to win two successive WBT ranking events is no mean achievement," he said.

==== Results ====
Semi-finals:
[5] Jason Greenslade (WAL) bt [4] Alex Marshall (SCO) 7-7, 8-6
[3] Paul Foster (SCO) bt [2] David Gourlay (AUS) 4–8, 11–3, 2-1

Final:
[3] Paul Foster (SCO) bt [5] Jason Greenslade (WAL) 15–5, 5–6, 2-1

Date	Place	Event	Winner	Second	SF's	QF's
October 28 – November 4, 2007	Sheffield, England	Int'l Open 2007	(Scotland) Paul Foster	(Wales) Jason Greenslade	(Scotland) Alex Marshall (Australia) David Gourlay	(England) Greg Harlow (Wales) Robert Weale (England) Andy Thomson (England) Mervyn King

=== The Great British Mobility Group Scottish International Open 2007 ===
Andy Thomson won the Great British Mobility Scottish International Open at Perth, beating Mark Royal 11-5 8–5 in the final at the Dewar's Centre. The St Andrews-born number eight seed, representing England, was always in control against Royal, seeded 13.
Royal had earlier shocked top seed Kevin Kerkow as well as ending Paul Foster's hopes of holding three World Bowls Tour titles simultaneously.
Thomson was responsible for defeating second seed David Gourlay.

==== Results ====
Semi-finals:
(13) M Royal (Eng) bt Holder (1) K Kerkow (Aus) 7-10 9-8 2-1
(8) A Thomson (Eng) bt (6) J Greenslade (Wal) 10-9 2-10 2-1

Final:
(8) Andy Thomson (Eng) bt (13) Mark Royal (Eng) 11-5 8–5,

Date	Place	Event	Winner	Second	SF's	QF's
November 24 – December 1, 2007	Perth, Scotland	Scottish Int'l Open 2007	(England) Andy Thomson	(England) Mark Royal	(Australia) Kelvin Kerkow (Wales) Jason Greenslade	(Wales) Robert Weale (England) Les Gillett (England) Nicky Brett (Australia) David Gourlay

== See also ==
- 2006-07 World Bowls Tour
