= 2023 World Indoor Bowls Championship =

Indoor Bowls Championship

- 45th World Indoor Bowls Championship
- Location: (England) Hopton-on-Sea, Great Yarmouth, Norfolk
- Date: 6–22 January 2023
- Category: World Indoor Championships

This page is about the World Bowls Tour Championships.

The 2023 Imagine Cruising World Indoor Bowls Championship took place at Potters Leisure Resort, Hopton-on-Sea, Great Yarmouth, England, from 6 to 22 January 2023.

There were two preliminary round ties in the open singles, with Jason Banks beating Darren Weir and Jon Wilson defeating Scott Edwards. Banks went on to reach the final where he met Jamie Walker. This was first time that the open/men's singles final featured two unseeded players since seeds were introduced in 1988. Previously, eight unseeded players had reached finals (five went on to win) but all eight had played seeded players in the final.

In the final, Walker gained a five shot lead after just two ends but Banks continually played close to the jack and drew level before Walker won the last end with the last bowl. The second set was also close with Banks leading before Walker managed to level the set on the last end and by doing so win the title.

Katherine Rednall won her fifth women's singles to extend her record, she fought back after losing the first set to defeat Ceri Ann Glen in the tie break set.

Greg Harlow and Nick Brett won the Open Pairs defeating Jason Greenslade and Michael Stepney in the final. It was Brett's six title and Harlow's fifth title over all disciplines.

Stewart Anderson and Ceri Ann Glen won the mixed pairs final, it was Anderson's sixth win over all disciplines.

Scotland's Daniel Pool became the first player to win consecutive Under-25 Singles titles.

== Winners ==
Event	Winner
Open Singles	(England) Jamie Walker
Women's Singles	(England) Katherine Rednall
Open Pairs	(England) Greg Harlow & Nick Brett
Mixed Pairs	(Scotland) Stewart Anderson & (Wales) Ceri Ann Glen
Open Under-25 Singles	(Scotland) Daniel Pool

== Draw and results ==
=== Open Singles ===
First round
1	(England) Les Gillett	10	12
(England) Stuart Irwin	1	6
16	(England) Simon Skelton	1	4
(Scotland) Jason Banks	10	8
9	(Guernsey) Jason Greenslade	10	9
(United States) Neil Furman	4	2
8	(England) Mervyn King	9	9
(South Africa) Thinus Oelofse	2	5
5	(England) Mark Dawes	9	10
(Australia) Sean Mawdsley	4	2
12	(Scotland) Michael Stepney	7	6	2
(England) Sam Tolchard	9	5	1
13	(Scotland) David Gourlay	10	14
(Canada) Kody Olthof	3	4
4	(England) Nick Brett	10	5	2
(Northern Ireland) Jonathan Ross	5	7	0
3	(Scotland) Stewart Anderson	6	7
(England) David Bolt	5	3
14	(England) Wayne Willgress	9	6
(England) Katherine Rednall	8	4
11	(Scotland) Alex Marshall	4	5
(England) Mark Royal	7	9
6	(England) Greg Harlow	6	5
(England) Jamie Walker	7	5
7	(England) Jamie Chestney	6	5
(England) Jon Wilson	9	7
10	(England) Robert Paxton	13	9
(Israel) Noam Yehudai	5	5
15	(Scotland) Darren Burnett	6	11	2
(New Zealand) Colin Rogan	9	5	0
2	(Scotland) Paul Foster	14	8
(Hong Kong) Jason Choi	0	3

Second round
1	(England) Les Gillett	5	8
(Scotland) Jason Banks	10	11
9	(Guernsey) Jason Greenslade	6	14
8	(England) Mervyn King	6	2
5	(England) Mark Dawes	6	8
12	(Scotland) Michael Stepney	5	6
13	(Scotland) David Gourlay	8	5	2
4	(England) Nick Brett	7	10	0
3	(Scotland) Stewart Anderson	6	2	1
14	(England) Wayne Willgress	5	8	2
(England) Mark Royal	4	7	0
(England) Jamie Walker	7	2	2
(England) Jon Wilson	2	5
10	(England) Robert Paxton	11	6
15	(Scotland) Darren Burnett	5	0
2	(Scotland) Paul Foster	10	11

Quarter-finals
(Scotland) Jason Banks	11	10
9	(Guernsey) Jason Greenslade	6	9
5	(England) Mark Dawes	8	7
13	(Scotland) David Gourlay	2	2
14	(England) Wayne Willgress	7	8	0
(England) Jamie Walker	7	8	2
10	(England) Robert Paxton	7	10
2	(Scotland) Paul Foster	7	1

Semi-finals
(Scotland) Jason Banks	7	8	2
5	(England) Mark Dawes	8	5	0
(England) Jamie Walker	9	8	2
10	(England) Robert Paxton	9	8	0

Final
(Scotland) Jason Banks	7	7
(England) Jamie Walker	8	7

=== Women's Singles ===
First round
(England) Katherine Rednall	12	7
(New Zealand) Clare Hendra	2	7
(England) Nicole Rogers	13	12
(South Africa) Gillian Young	4	7
(Wales) Ceri Ann Glen	6	9	2
(Scotland) Julie Forrest	8	8	0
(Guernsey) Alison Merrien MBE	5	2
(Australia) Lisa Featherby	7	7

Semi-finals
(England) Katherine Rednall	12	9
(England) Nicole Rogers	4	1
(Wales) Ceri Ann Glen	8	10
(Australia) Lisa Featherby	6	6

Final
(England) Katherine Rednall	7	12	2
(Wales) Ceri Ann Glen	12	5	1

=== Open Pairs ===
First round
(England) Jack Wells (England) Sam King	8	10
(South Africa) Thinus Oelofse (South Africa) Gillian Young	3	1
(Israel) Ruthie Gilor (Israel) Tzvika Hadar	4	3
(Wales) Daniel Salmon (Wales) Damian Doubler	9	11
(England) Paul Hartley (England) David Bolt	12	11
(United States) Scottie Marzonie (United States) Frank Napoli	5	7
(Northern Ireland) Mark McPeak (Northern Ireland) Stuart Bennett	8	12	1
(Australia) Sean Mawdsley (United States) Neil Furman	9	3	2
(England) Louis Ridout (England) Sam Tolchard	4	5
(Canada) Kody Olthof (Canada) Dylan Jacobs	9	7
(New Zealand) Colin Rogan (New Zealand) Garry Cotter	9	6	1
(Scotland) Chris Carswell (Scotland) John Carswell	4	9	2

Second round
(Scotland) Stewart Anderson (Scotland) Darren Burnett	8	11
(England) Jack Wells (England) Sam King	3	5
(England) Mervyn King (Scotland) David Gourlay	8	4
(Hong Kong) Ken Chan (Hong Kong) Jason Choi	8	9
(England) Robert Paxton (England) Simon Skelton	5	4
(Wales) Daniel Salmon (Wales) Damian Doubler	8	6
(England) Nick Brett (England) Greg Harlow	8	8
(England) Paul Hartley (England) David Bolt	7	3
(Scotland) Paul Foster (Scotland) Alex Marshall	11	10
(Australia) Sean Mawdsley (United States) Neil Furman	6	3
(Guernsey) Jason Greenslade (Scotland) Michael Stepney	5	11	2
(Canada) Kody Olthof (Canada) Dylan Jacobs	7	4	0
(England) Mark Dawes (England) Jamie Chestney	7	7	0
(England) Jamie Walker (England) Perry Martin	2	8	2
(England) Les Gillett (England) Wayne Willgress	11	2	2
(Scotland) Chris Carswell (Scotland) John Carswell	4	7	0

Quarter-finals
(Scotland) Stewart Anderson (Scotland) Darren Burnett	4	6
(Hong Kong) Ken Chan (Hong Kong) Jason Choi	8	9
(Wales) Daniel Salmon (Wales) Damian Doubler	4	6
(England) Nick Brett (England) Greg Harlow	8	6
(Scotland) Paul Foster (Scotland) Alex Marshall	3	7	1
(Guernsey) Jason Greenslade (Scotland) Michael Stepney	8	6	2
(England) Jamie Walker (England) Perry Martin	6	6
(England) Les Gillett (England) Wayne Willgress	5	5

Semi-finals
(Hong Kong) Ken Chan (Hong Kong) Jason Choi	9	6	0
(England) Nick Brett (England) Greg Harlow	5	9	2
(Guernsey) Jason Greenslade (Scotland) Michael Stepney	7	10
(England) Jamie Walker (England) Perry Martin	6	1

Final
(England) Nick Brett (England) Greg Harlow	10	9
(Guernsey) Jason Greenslade (Scotland) Michael Stepney	4	5

=== Mixed Pairs ===
First Round
(Scotland) Paul Foster (Guernsey) Alison Merrien	8	9
(England) Jamie Chestney (New Zealand) Clare Hendra	3	4
(England) Mark Dawes (Scotland) Julie Forrest	10	5
(England) Les Gillett (England) Katherine Rednall	4	5
(England) Mervyn King (Australia) Lisa Featherby	9	10
(England) Greg Harlow (South Africa) Gillian Young	6	2
(England) Nick Brett (England) Nicole Rogers	11	3	1
(Scotland) Stewart Anderson (Wales) Ceri Ann Glen	9	9	2

Semi-finals
(Scotland) Paul Foster (Guernsey) Alison Merrien	6	2	2
(England) Mark Dawes (Scotland) Julie Forrest	5	7	1
(England) Mervyn King (Australia) Lisa Featherby	6	11	0
(Scotland) Stewart Anderson (Wales) Ceri Ann Glen	9	6	2

Final
(Scotland) Paul Foster (Guernsey) Alison Merrien	8	2
(Scotland) Stewart Anderson (Wales) Ceri Ann Glen	8	11

=== Open Under 25 ===
Semi-finals
(Scotland) Daniel Pool	13	13
(South Africa) Gillian Young	3	1
(England) Nicole Rogers	6	5
(Scotland) Darren Weir	8	6

Final
(Scotland) Daniel Pool	8	7	2
(Scotland) Darren Weir	6	12	0
