= 2005 World Indoor Bowls Championship =

World Indoor Championships 2005
- 27th World Indoor Bowls Championships
- Location: (England) Great Yarmouth, Norfolk
- Date(s): January, 2005.
- Category: World Indoor Championships

The 2005 Potters Holidays World Indoor Bowls Championship was held at Potters Leisure Resort, Hopton on Sea, Great Yarmouth, England, in 2005.

== Winners ==
Event	Winner
Men's Singles	(Scotland) Paul Foster
Women's Singles	(England) Ellen Falkner
Men's Pairs	(Australia) Kelvin Kerkow & (England) Mervyn King
Mixed Pairs	(Wales) John Price & (England) Carol Ashby

== Draw and results ==
=== Men's singles ===
==== Finals ====
Semi-finals
8	(Wales) Price	11	7
4	(England) Thomson	3	7
7	(England) Bond	9	7	2
3	(Scotland) Foster	4	12	1

Final
8	(Wales) Price	10	7
3	(Scotland) Foster	10	8

==== Top half ====
First round
1	(Scotland) Alex Marshall	12	10
(New Zealand) Neville Risbridge	8	4
16	(England) Billy Jackson	5	6	2
(Australia) Steve Halmai	6	5	1
8	(Wales) John Price	11	7
(England) Adam Tidby	0	7
9	(Wales) Jason Greenslade	7	7
(Wales) Martin Selway	5	5
4	(England) Andy Thomson	11	7
(Scotland) Wayne Hogg	6	3
13	(England) Greg Harlow	10	7	1
(England) Simon Skelton	9	11	2
5	(Wales) Robert Weale	10	2	2
(Scotland) Joey Strickland	5	11	1
12	(Hong Kong) Noel Kennedy	8	10
(Scotland) Neil Speirs	8	7

Second round
1	(Scotland) Marshall
16	(England) Jackson	w/o
8	(Wales) Price	7	8	2
9	(Wales) Greenslade	11	7	1
4	(England) Thomson	9	11
(England) Skelton	3	6
5	(Wales) Weale	9	5	0
12	(Hong Kong) Kennedy	8	6	2

Quarter-finals
16	(England) Jackson	6	7
8	(Wales) Price	7	9
4	(England) Thomson	6	8
12	(Hong Kong) Kennedy	6	6

Semi-finals
8	(Wales) Price	11	7
4	(England) Thomson	3	7

==== Bottom half ====
First round
2	(Australia) David Gourlay	4	9	1
(England) Stuart Airey	8	4	2
15	(England) Mark Royal	3	8
(England) Graham Smith	12	8
7	(England) Ian Bond	10	8
(New Zealand) Ken Walker	1	7
10	(Northern Ireland) Jonathan Ross	12	7
(England) Mervyn King	7	6
3	(Scotland) Paul Foster	9	10
(Scotland) Darren Burnett	9	6
14	(England) Les Gillett	11	13
(England) David Howes	7	5
6	(Australia) Mark McMahon	7	11
(Northern Ireland) Neil Booth	3	4
11	(Australia) Kelvin Kerkow	6	6
(England) David Bolt	12	8

Second round
(England) Airey	6	8
(England) Smith	4	4
7	(England) Bond	9	6	2
10	(Northern Ireland) Ross	4	9	1
3	(Scotland) Foster	8	7	2
14	(England) Gillett	10	2	0
6	(Australia) McMahon	8	4	0
(England) Bolt	5	13	2

Quarter-finals
(England) Airey	6	6
7	(England) Bond	8	6
3	(Scotland) Foster	12	6	2
(England) Bolt	10	10	0

Semi-finals
7	(England) Bond	6	3
3	(Scotland) Foster	6	9

=== Women's singles ===
First round
(England) Lynne Whitehead	7	7
(Scotland) Julie Forrest	10	9
(Scotland) Caroline Brown	11	8
(England) Michelle Barlow	6	5
(England) Ellen Falkner	7	10
(England) Sarah McKay	2	4
(England) Carol Ashby	9	0	2
(New Zealand) Noreen Stratford	8	11	1

Semi-finals
(Scotland) Forrest	6	5
(Scotland) Brown	6	12
(England) Falkner	8	9
(England) Ashby	6	5

Final
(Scotland) Brown	8	6	1
(England) Falkner	6	11	2

=== Men's Pairs ===
First round
1	(Northern Ireland) Ian McClure (Northern Ireland) Jeremy Henry	5	6
(United States) Ed Quo (England) Mark Royal	10	7
8	(Australia) Kelvin Kerkow (England) Mervyn King	14	13
(Hong Kong) Gary Knowles (Hong Kong) John Lunn	7	1
4	(England) Ian Bond (England) Andy Thomson	8	8
(England) David Miller (England) Barry Jenkins	3	7
5	(Wales) Jason Greenslade (Wales) Robert Weale	13	11	2
(South Africa) Duanne Abrahams (South Africa) Greg Bingham	3	3	1
3	(Australia) David Gourlay (Australia) Mark McMahon	2	7	1
(Scotland) Graeme Donaldson (Scotland) Stuart Cruikshank	9	6	2
6	(Wales) John Price (Wales) Stephen Rees	13	5	2
(New Zealand) Kevin Robinson (New Zealand) Neville Risbridge	3	12	0
7	(England) Greg Harlow (Northern Ireland) Jonathan Ross	9	7
(Wales) Ian Butler (Wales) Ian Slade	4	5
2	(Scotland) Alex Marshall (Scotland) Paul Foster	9	4	2
(Australia) Steve Halmai (Australia) Frank Vella	5	8	1

Quarter-finals
(United States) Quo & (England) Royal
8	(England) King & (Australia) Kerkow
4	(England) Bond & (England) Thomson	6	7
5	(Wales) Greenslade & (Wales) Weale	6	6
(Scotland) Donaldson & (Scotland) Cruikshank	8	6
6	(Wales) Rees & (Wales) Price	9	6
7	(England) Harlow & (Northern Ireland) Ross	4	2
2	(Scotland) Foster & (Scotland) Marshall	9	10

Semi-finals
(England) King & (Australia) Kerkow	6	10
4	(England) Bond & (England) Thomson	6	7
6	(Wales) Rees & (Wales) Price	8	4	1
7	(Northern Ireland) Ross & (England) Harlow	6	8	2

Final
8	(England) King & (Australia) Kerkow	8	9
(Northern Ireland) Ross & (England) Harlow	6	7

=== Mixed Pairs ===
Quarter-finals
(Wales) John Price & (England) Carol Ashby	4	9	2
(Australia) Mark McMahon & (New Zealand) Noreen Stratford	9	6	1
(Australia) David Gourlay & (England) Sarah McKay	1	7	2
(England) Andy Thomson & (England) Ellen Falkner	10	6	1
(Wales) Robert Weale & (England) Michelle Barlow	7	8
(Northern Ireland) Jonathan Ross & (England) Gemma Broadhurst	7	5
(Scotland) Paul Foster & (Scotland) Caroline Brown	11	4	2
(Australia) Kelvin Kerkow & (England) Amy Monkhouse	10	10	0

Semi-finals
(Wales) Price & (England) Ashby	8	7
(Australia) Gourlay & (England) McKay	4	7
(Wales) Weale & (England) Barlow	7	5	2
(Scotland) Foster & (Scotland) Brown	6	9	1

Final
(Wales) Price & (England) Ashby	3	12	2
(Wales) Weale & (England) Barlow	10	6	1
