= Premier League Bowls =

- Sport: Bowls
- Founded: 2008
- Folded: 2011
- Broadcaster: Sky Sports

Premier League Bowls was a bowls tournament staged between 2008 and 2011, set-up by Barry and Eddie Hearns' Matchroom Sport promotions. The tournament featured six world class bowls players from the World Bowls Tour (WBT) playing in a league format with two semi-finals and a final after the completion of the league stages.

== History ==
The first two editions of the tournament were played indoors at Potters Leisure Resort in Great Yarmouth, England. The last two editions of the tournament were played outdoors in 2010 and 2011, after the event was moved to the Athena Beach Hotel in Paphos, Cyprus, with Wyldecrest Park Homes announced as the new tournament sponsors in 2010.

== Entrants ==
Only both of the Scottish former World Indoor champions and Pairs partners Alex Marshall and Paul Foster competed in all four editions of Premier League Bowls.

2008	2009	2010	2011
(Scotland) Alex Marshall	(Scotland) Alex Marshall	(Scotland) Alex Marshall	(Scotland) Alex Marshall
(England) Andy Thomson	(England) Billy Jackson	(Scotland) Darren Burnett	(Australia) Kelvin Kerkow
(Australia) Ceri Ann Davies	(Scotland) Darren Burnett	(England) Greg Harlow	(England) Mark Royal
(England) Greg Harlow	(England) Greg Harlow	(England) Ian Bond	(England) Mervyn King
(England) Mark Royal	(Scotland) Paul Foster	(England) Mervyn King	(Scotland) Paul Foster
(Scotland) Paul Foster	(England) Robert Chisholm	(Scotland) Paul Foster	(Wales) Robert Weale

== Finals ==
Year	Winner	Result	Runner up	Ref
2008	(Scotland) Paul Foster (1/3)	6–3, 5–1	(Scotland) Alex Marshall	
2009	(Scotland) Paul Foster (2/3)	5–2, 4–4	(Scotland) Darren Burnett	
2010	(England) Mervyn King	8–1, 1–10, 1–0	(Scotland) Alex Marshall	
2011	(Scotland) Paul Foster (3/3)	4–5, 9–5, 1–0	(England) Mark Royal	
