= 2012 World Outdoor Bowls Championship – Men's pairs =

Lawn bowls event

World Outdoor Championships 2012 men's pairs
- 12th World Outdoor Bowls Championships
- Location: Adelaide, Australia
- Date(s): 24 November - 9 December 2012.
- Category: 2012 World Outdoor Bowls Championship

The 2012 World Outdoor Bowls Championship men's pairs was held at the Lockleys Bowling Club in Adelaide, Australia. Some of the qualifying Rounds were held at the nearby Holdfast Bowling Club in Glenelg North.

Alex Marshall and Paul Foster won the men's pairs Gold.

== Section tables ==
=== Pool 1 ===
| Pos | Player | P | W | D | L | F | A | Pts | Shots |
|---|---|---|---|---|---|---|---|---|---|
| 1 | (Canada) Ryan Bester & John Bezear | 11 | 10 | 0 | 1 | 231 | 133 | 20 | +98 |
| 2 | (England) Jamie Chestney & Graham Shadwell | 11 | 10 | 0 | 1 | 217 | 148 | 20 | +69 |
| 3 | (Wales) Robert Weale & Jason Greenslade | 11 | 9 | 0 | 2 | 248 | 140 | 18 | +108 |
| 4 | (New Zealand) Richard Girvan & Shannon McIlroy | 11 | 7 | 0 | 4 | 204 | 164 | 14 | +40 |
| 5 | (Jersey) Malcolm De Sousa & Greg Davis | 11 | 6 | 1 | 4 | 207 | 178 | 13 | +29 |
| 6 | (Malaysia) Muhammad Hizlee Abdul Rais & Soufi Rusli | 11 | 5 | 1 | 5 | 204 | 174 | 11 | +30 |
| 7 | (Zimbabwe) Richard Hayden & Cliff Robertson | 11 | 4 | 1 | 6 | 176 | 196 | 9 | -20 |
| 8 | (United States) Neil Furman & Aaron Zangl | 11 | 4 | 0 | 7 | 178 | 201 | 8 | -23 |
| 9 | (Philippines) Christopher Dagpin & Hommer Mercado | 11 | 3 | 1 | 7 | 175 | 206 | 7 | -31 |
| 10 | (Spain) Frank Pain & Paul Brown | 11 | 3 | 0 | 8 | 164 | 182 | 6 | -18 |
| 11 | (Hong Kong) Danny Ho & Andy Chan | 11 | 3 | 0 | 8 | 176 | 203 | 6 | -27 |
| 12 | (Japan) Hirokazu Mori & Junki Goda | 11 | 0 | 0 | 11 | 98 | 353 | 0 | -255 |

=== Pool 2 ===
| Pos | Player | P | W | D | L | F | A | Pts | Shots |
|---|---|---|---|---|---|---|---|---|---|
| 1 | (Scotland) Alex Marshall & Paul Foster | 11 | 10 | 0 | 1 | 243 | 128 | 20 | +115 |
| 2 | (Australia) Aron Sherriff & Leif Selby | 11 | 9 | 1 | 1 | 250 | 128 | 19 | +122 |
| 3 | (Republic of Ireland) Ian McClure & Martin McHugh | 11 | 9 | 0 | 2 | 203 | 145 | 18 | +58 |
| 4 | (Namibia) Willem Esterhuizen & Douw Calitz | 11 | 8 | 0 | 3 | 227 | 141 | 16 | +86 |
| 5 | (South Africa) Gerry Baker & Petrus Breitenbach | 11 | 7 | 1 | 3 | 228 | 145 | 15 | +83 |
| 6 | China | 11 | 5 | 0 | 6 | 203 | 154 | 10 | +49 |
| 7 | (Brazil) Peter Gordon & Alex Lojelo Munn | 11 | 5 | 0 | 6 | 152 | 204 | 10 | -52 |
| 8 | (Fiji) Semesa Naiseruvati & David Aitcheson | 11 | 2 | 3 | 6 | 131 | 214 | 7 | -83 |
| 9 | (Botswana) Oabona Motladiile & Joshua Mothusi | 11 | 2 | 1 | 8 | 145 | 209 | 5 | -64 |
| 10 | Thailand | 10 | 2 | 0 | 8 | 135 | 221 | 4 | -86 |
| 11 | (Israel) Colin Silberstein & Roy Ben-Ari | 11 | 1 | 2 | 8 | 127 | 236 | 4 | -109 |
| 12 | (Brunei) Mohd Salleh Mohd Huzaimi & Another | 11 | 1 | 0 | 10 | 117 | 236 | 2 | -119 |

== Finals ==
Play Offs
Scotland
bye
England | 24
Wales | 9
Canada
bye
Australia | 23
(Republic of Ireland) Ireland | 14

Semifinals
Scotland | 13
England | 12
Canada | 12
Australia | 25

Gold medal
Scotland | 18
Australia | 13

== Results ==
Men's pairs section 1
| Round 1 - Nov 29 | | |
| New Zealand | Malaysia | 18-13 |
| England | Canada | 19-17 |
| Zimbabwe | Hong Kong | 20-17 |
| Wales | Spain | 20-10 |
| Jersey | Philippines | 16-14 |
| United States | Japan | 24-11 |
| Round 2 - Nov 29 | | |
| Philippines | Japan | 27-18 |
| Canada | New Zealand | 26-13 |
| United States | Jersey | 20-14 |
| Wales | Hong Kong | 24-11 |
| Spain | Jersey | 18-11 |
| England | Malaysia | 20-9 |
| Round 3 - Nov 30 | | |
| England | United States | 20-15 |
| Spain | Japan | 30-4 |
| New Zealand | Hong Kong | 24-14 |
| Zimbabwe | Malaysia | 16-15 |
| Canada | Philippines | 21-14 |
| Wales | Jersey | 23-11 |
| Round 4 - Nov 30 | | |
| Zimbabwe | Japan | 25-12 |
| Malaysia | Spain | 21-13 |
| Wales | New Zealand | 24-10 |
| Canada | Jersey | 20-8 |
| Hong Kong | United States | 21-15 |
| England | Philippines | 17-16 |
| Round 5 - Nov 30 | | |
| Canada | Spain | 23-13 |
| Jersey | New Zealand | 21-18 |
| Wales | England | 27-10 |
| Hong Kong | Japan | 31-7 |
| Zimbabwe | United States | 20-19 |
| Malaysia | Philippines | 30-10 |
| Round 6 - Dec 1 | | |
| Malaysia | Japan | 29-8 |
| Wales | Philippines | 24-11 |
| Jersey | Spain | 19-18 |
| Canada | Hong Kong | 23-10 |
| England | Zimbabwe | 18-16 |
| New Zealand | United States | 20-6 |
| Round 7 - Dec 1 | | |
| Wales | Zimbabwe | 25-12 |
| England | Jersey | 15-14 |
| Canada | United States | 22-11 |
| New Zealand | Japan | 34-7 |
| Malaysia | Hong Kong | 15-15 |
| Philippines | Spain | 16-14 |
| Round 8 - Dec 2 | | |
| Philippines | Hong Kong | 21-14 |
| New Zealand | Zimbabwe | 21-13 |
| Canada | Malaysia | 20-13 |
| Wales | United States | 16-13 |
| England | Spain | 20-6 |
| Jersey | Japan | 39-4 |
| Round 9 - Dec 2 | | |
| Hong Kong | Jersey | 19-19 |
| Malaysia | United States | 24-17 |
| New Zealand | Spain | 16-9 |
| Canada | Wales | 18-8 |
| England | Japan | 44-6 |
| Zimbabwe | Philippines | 14-14 |
| Round 10 - Dec 3 | | |
| Canada | Zimbabwe | 14-13 |
| Jersey | Malaysia | 23-11 |
| United States | Spain | 18-15 |
| New Zealand | Philippines | 18-14 |
| Wales | Japan | 43-10 |
| England | Hong Kong | 17-10 |
| Round 11 - Dec 3 | | |
| Spain | Hong Kong | 18-14 |
| United States | Philippines | 20-18 |
| Malaysia | Wales | 24-14 |
| Canada | Japan | 27-11 |
| England | New Zealand | 17-12 |
| Jersey | Zimbabwe | 23-16 |

Men's pairs section 2
| Round 1 - Nov 29 | | |
| Australia | Scotland | 16-16 |
| Brunei | Botswana | 18-16 |
| Ireland | Namibia | 22-11 |
| Brazil | Israel | 28-11 |
| China | Thailand | 16-14 |
| South Africa | Fiji | 34-7 |
| Round 2 - Nov 29 | | |
| Botswana | Thailand | 18-10 |
| Scotland | South Africa | 23-20 |
| China | Brunei | 23-11 |
| Namibia | Brazil | 23-12 |
| Ireland | Israel | 21-8 |
| Australia | Fiji | 24-9 |
| Round 3 - Nov 30 | | |
| Australia | Ireland | 19-10 |
| China | Brazil | 20-11 |
| Fiji | Brunei | 15-11 |
| Botswana | Israel | 20-13 |
| Scotland | Namibia | 21-14 |
| South Africa | Thailand | 27-9 |
| Round 4 - Nov 30 | | |
| Namibia | Brunei | 22-10 |
| Ireland | Botswana | 14-10 |
| Fiji | Thailand | 19-11 |
| South Africa | China | 17-16 |
| Scotland | Brazil | 18-12 |
| Australia | Israel | 29-13 |
| Round 5 - Nov 30 | | |
| Brazil | Fiji | 17-15 |
| Namibia | Botswana | 15-12 |
| Ireland | Brunei | 26-5 |
| Scotland | China | 20-8 |
| South Africa | Israel | 16-16 |
| Australia | Thailand | 25-11 |
| Round 6 - Dec 1 | | |
| Australia | Botswana | 27-11 |
| Brazil | Thailand | 15-10 |
| China | Israel | 24-7 |
| Namibia | South Africa | 15-14 |
| Ireland | Fiji | 19-11 |
| Scotland | Brunei | 40-7 |
| Round 7 - Dec 1 | | |
| Ireland | Brazil | 24-18 |
| China | Fiji | 26-9 |
| South Africa | Brunei | 16-14 |
| Scotland | Botswana | 24-13 |
| Australia | Namibia | 22-15 |
| Thailand | Israel | 27-19 |
| Round 8 - Dec 2 | | |
| Brazil | Brunei | 16-11 |
| Israel | Fiji | 14-14 |
| China | Botswana | 28-12 |
| Namibia | Thailand | 33-2 |
| Scotland | Ireland | 19-15 |
| South Africa | Australia | 14-13 |
| Round 9 - Dec 2 | | |
| South Africa | Brazil | 30-6 |
| Scotland | Israel | 23-4 |
| Namibia | China | 20-16 |
| Australia | Brunei | 27-9 |
| Ireland | Thailand | 17-16 |
| Fiji | Botswana | 15-15 |
| Round 10 - Dec 3 | | |
| Ireland | South Africa | 20-15 |
| Australia | China | 18-13 |
| Namibia | Fiji | 29-3 |
| Scotland | Thailand | 25-5 |
| Brazil | Botswana | 20-12 |
| Israel | Brunei | 15-14 |
| Round 11 - Dec 3 | | |
| Namibia | Israel | 30-7 |
| Australia | Brazil | 30-7 |
| Thailand | Brunei | 20-7 |
| South Africa | Botswana | 25-6 |
| Scotland | Fiji | 14-14 |
| Ireland | China | 15-14 |
