= Rebecca Field (bowls) =

English international lawn & indoor bowls player

Personal information
- Nickname: Bex
- Nationality: British (English)
- Born: 1990 York, Yorkshire, England
Medal record
Representing England
World Indoor Bowls Championships
Gold medal – first place	2013	singles
Silver medal – second place	2014	singles
Silver medal – second place	2016	singles
Silver medal – second place	2018	singles
European Championships
Gold medal – first place	2015 Israel	pairs
Gold medal – first place	2015 Israel	mixed pairs
Gold medal – first place	2015 Israel	team

Rebecca Field married name Rebecca Willgress is an English international lawn & indoor bowls player. Field was the 2013 World Indoor singles champion.

== Personal life ==
Field starting playing bowls at the age of eight, in her local village hall in York, giving the short mat game a go. She was attracted to the sport following a big drive in the 1990s to get people playing indoor bowls in their communities. Subsequent moves to Boston, Lincolnshire with her family and then to study at the University of East Anglia in Norwich only increased her appetite for the game. Field has language degrees in French and Spanish and currently works for a Norwich-based marketing firm.

Field is a supporter of the Championship team Norwich City Football Club.

== Bowls career ==
=== Indoors ===
Field plays and competes for the Norfolk Bowling Club in Norwich. She competed as a junior (U25) international player for several years and won multiple titles. Amongst her accomplishments as a junior, is being a two-time English and British Isles indoor singles champion.

Field first competed for the England senior ladies team at indoor level in 2011, when she was named in the squad for the BIWIBC International Series. Field competed at her first World Indoor Championships in 2012 in the ladies singles event. Organisers invited Field to the competition after being impressed with her recent rise in the sport.

Field reached her first World Indoor Bowls ladies singles final in 2013, defeating Alison Merrien in a tie-break set becoming the youngest ever winner of the event at 23. The victory gained Field a wild card entry into the WBT International Open and direct qualification for the World Indoor Championships in 2014, where she was beaten by 18-year-old Katherine Rednall in the final.

Field was twice runner-up in the 2016 World Indoor Bowls Championship and 2018 World Indoor Bowls Championship losing to Ellen Falkner and Katherine Rednall respectively.

=== Outdoors ===
Field won her first outdoor titles, winning the ladies two-wood singles and junior pairs events at the National Championships in 2014. She first competed for the England senior ladies team at outdoor level in 2015, when she was named in the squad for BWIBC International Series. Also at outdoor level in 2015, Field was selected to represent England at the European Team Championships and Atlantic Rim Games. She won gold in the ladies pairs, mixed fours and team events at the European Team Championships.

In 2018, she finished runner-up to Amy Gowshall in the National Two Wood Singles. Five years later, she won another national title at the 2023 Bowls England National Finals, partnering her husband Wayne in the mixed pairs.

== Titles and finals ==
Legend
'World' Championships
European Championships
British Championships
English Championships
County Championships
Other

Year		Org	Competition	Level	Event		Ref
2016	Outdoor	BE	Bowls England National Championships	Senior	Ladies Fours	Runner-up	
2016	Outdoor	NBA	NBA Women's County Finals	Senior	Ladies 4-Wood Singles	Won	
2016	Outdoor	NBA	NBA Women's County Finals	Senior	Ladies Triples	Won	
2016	Outdoor	NBA	NBA Women's County Finals	Senior	Ladies Rinks	Won	
2016	Outdoor	BIWBC	BIWBC International Series	Senior	Ladies Team	Won	
2016	Indoor	BIWIBC	BIWIBC International Series	Senior	Ladies Team		
2016	Indoor	EWIBA	EIBA / EWIBA National Championships	Senior	Vivienne Trophy	Won	
2016	Indoor	EWIBA	EIBA / EWIBA National Championships	Senior	Egham Trophy	Won	
2016	Indoor	EWIBA	EIBA / EWIBA National Championships	Senior	Atherley Trophy	Won	
2016	Indoor	PBA	World Indoor Bowls Championships	Senior	Ladies Singles	Runner-up	
2015	Outdoor	EBU	European Bowls Championships	Senior	Ladies Pairs	Won	
2015	Outdoor	EBU	European Bowls Championships	Senior	Mixed Fours	Won	
2015	Outdoor	EBU	European Bowls Championships	Senior	Combined Team	Won	
2015	Outdoor	BIWBC	BIWBC International Series	Senior	Ladies Team	Won	
2015	Indoor	BIWIBC	BIWIBC International Series	Senior	Ladies Team	Won	
2015	Indoor	BIWIBC	BIIBC / BIWIBC Championships	Senior	Ladies Triples	Won	
2015	Indoor	BIWIBC	BIIBC / BIWIBC Championships		Combined Team^{1}	Won	
2015	Indoor	EWIBA	EIBA / EWIBA National Championships	Senior	Ladies Champion of Champions	Won	
2014	Outdoor	BE	Bowls England National Championships	Senior	Ladies 2-Wood Singles	Won	
2014	Outdoor	BE	Bowls England National Championships	Junior	Ladies Pairs	Won	
2014	Indoor	BIWIBC	BIWIBC International Series	Senior	Ladies Team	Won	
2014	Indoor	BIWIBC	BIWIBC Under-25 International Series	Jnr / U25	Ladies Team	Won	
2014	Indoor	EWIBA	EIBA / EWIBA National Championships	Senior	Ladies Triples	Won	
2014	Indoor	EWIBA	EIBA / EWIBA National Championships	Senior	Mixed Fours	Runner-up	
2014	Indoor	PBA	World Indoor Bowls Championships	Senior	Ladies Singles	Runner-up	
2013	Outdoor	BIWBC	BIWBC Under-25 International Series	Jnr / U25	Ladies Team	Won	
2013	Indoor	BIWIBC	BIWIBC International Series	Senior	Ladies Team	Won	
2013	Indoor	BIWIBC	BIWIBC Under-25 International Series	Jnr / U25	Ladies Team	Won	
2013	Indoor	BIWIBC	BIIBC / BIWIBC Championships	Senior	Ladies Singles	Won	
2013	Indoor	BIWIBC	BIIBC / BIWIBC Championships		Combined Team^{1}	Won	
2013	Indoor	EWIBA	EIBA / EWIBA National Championships	Senior	Ladies Fours	Runner-up	
2013	Indoor	EWIBA	EIBA / EWIBA National Championships	Senior	Mixed Fours	Won	
2013	Indoor	PBA	World Indoor Bowls Championships	Senior	Ladies Singles	Won	
2012	Indoor	NCWIBA	NCIBA / NCWIBA County Championships	Senior	Ladies Singles	Won	
2012	Indoor	BIWIBC	BIWIBC International Series	Senior	Ladies Team	Won	
2012	Indoor	BIWIBC	BIWIBC Under-25 International Series	Jnr / U25	Ladies Team	Won	
2012	Indoor	WIBC	WIBC Under-25 Championships	U25	Ladies Singles	Runner-up	
2012	Indoor	EWIBA	EIBA / EWIBA National Championships	Senior	Ladies Singles	Won	
2011	Outdoor	NBA	NBA Women's County Finals	U25	Ladies Singles	Runner-up	
2011	Indoor	BIWIBC	BIWIBC International Series	Senior	Ladies Team	Won	
2011	Indoor	BIWIBC	BIWIBC Under-25 International Series	Jnr / U25	Ladies Team	Won	
2011	Indoor	BIWIBC	BIIBC / BIWIBC Championships	Jnr / U25	Ladies Singles	Won	
2011	Indoor	EWIBA	EIBA / EWIBA National Championships	U25	Ladies Singles	Won	
2010	Indoor	BIWIBC	BIWIBC Under-25 International Series	Jnr / U25	Ladies Team	Won	
2010	Indoor	BIWIBC	BIIBC / BIWIBC Championships	Senior	Ladies Pairs	Won	
2009	Indoor	BIWIBC	BIIBC / BIWIBC Championships	Jnr / U25	Ladies Singles	Won	
2009	Indoor	EWIBA	EIBA / EWIBA National Championships	Senior	Ladies Pairs	Runner-up	
2009	Indoor	EWIBA	EIBA / EWIBA National Championships	U25	Ladies Singles	Won	

^{1}The Gedling Trophy is awarded to the best overall performing nation.

== Awards ==
- Norwich Sportsperson of the Year (2013)

== Personal life ==
Her husband is England international Wayne Willgress.
