= Jason Choi =

Lawn bowl player from Hong Kong

Personal information
- Nationality: Chinese (Hongkonger)
Medal record
Representing (Hong Kong)
Asia Pacific Bowls Championships
Bronze medal – third place	2015 Christchurch	fours

Jason Choi is an international lawn bowler from China (Hong Kong).

== Bowls career ==
Choi was selected as part of the five man team by Hong Kong for the 2016 World Outdoor Bowls Championship, which was held in Avonhead, Christchurch, New Zealand.

He won a fours bronze medal (with Chun Yat Wong, Tony Cheung and Terry Kung), at the 2015 Asia Pacific Bowls Championships, held in Christchurch, New Zealand.

In 2023, Choi reached the semi-finals of the open pairs with Ken Chan at the 2023 World Indoor Bowls Championship. On their way to the semi-finals they defeated the world champions Darren Burnett and Stewart Anderson in the quarter-finals.
