= Marion Purcell =

Personal information
- Nationality: Wales
- Born: 1960 (age 65–66) Pontypool

Sport
- Club: Islwyn-Torfaen (Indoor); Whiteheads, Newport (outdoor)
Medal record
Representing Wales
World Indoor Bowls Championships
Gold medal – first place	2015	Mixed pairs
Gold medal – first place	2020	Mixed pairs

Marion Purcell is a Welsh international lawn and indoor bowler.

== Bowls career ==
In 2015, she won the mixed pairs title at the 2015 World Indoor Bowls Championship with Robert Paxton. She won a second title partnering Nick Brett in the mixed pairs at the 2020 World Indoor Bowls Championship.
