= World Bowls Tour =

Sports organisation

- Abbreviation: WBT
- Formation: 1997
- Headquarters: Lancaster, United Kingdom
- Chairperson (PBA): David Bolt

The World Bowls Tour is an organisation that promotes indoor bowls and organises competitions including the World Indoor Bowls Championships, operating primarily in the United Kingdom.

== History ==
In 1990, the sport was experiencing period of fragmentation following the loss of the television coverage of the World Indoor Bowls Championships. John Hall, the President of the English Bowls Association, unsuccessfully called for closer co-operation between the indoor and outdoor games. In 1992, a player-led organisation formed the Professional Bowls Association, during the 1992 World Indoor Bowls Championship, which was held in the Preston Guildhall to promote indoor bowls worldwide and on television.

On 1 January 1997, under the then-chairman Richard Corsie, the PBA created the World Bowls Tour and after the 1997 championship replaced the World Indoor Bowls Council as the leading indoor organisation. The purpose of the World Bowls Tour was to create championships and competitions to further the aims of the PBA.

== Structure ==
Position	Name
Chairperson	David Bolt
Tournament Director	Tom Weir
Assistant Tournament Director & Finance Director	Martin Gale
Corporate Director	Jason Parkinson

== Events ==
=== Former events ===
==== International Open ====
- Previous names: CIS UK Championship (1983-1993), Saga/BUPA Care Homes International Open (1994-2004), engage International Open (2005-2008), Co-op International Open (2013-2018)

Year	Winner	Runner-Up	Score	Ref
1983	(England) David Bryant (1/2)	(Scotland) Bob Sutherland	7–4 7–3 7–1	
1984	(Wales) Terry Sullivan	(England) Tony Allcock	5–4 (sets)	
1985	(Northern Ireland) Jim Baker	(Scotland) John Watson	5–7 4–7 7–0 7–3 7–3 7–6 7–4	
1986	(Wales) Stephen Rees	(England) David Bryant	7–3 7–2 7–0 7–1 2–7 3–7 4–7 4–7 7–0	
1987	(England) Tony Allcock	(Northern Ireland) David Corkill	7–6 1–7 2–7 7–3 7–0 4–7 7–4 5–7 7–5	
1988	(England) Gary Smith	(Scotland) Richard Corsie	6–7 7–5 7–5 7–6 7–6 3–7 6–7 7–0	
1989	(England) David Bryant (2/2)	(Northern Ireland) David Corkill	1–5 5–7 7–6 7–5 7–3	
1991	(England) Andy Thomson (1/3)	(England) Tony Allcock	6–7 4–7 7–5 7–2 7–1	
1992	(England) Andy Thomson (2/3)	(Wales) John Price	7–3 3–7 7–5 7–5	
1994	(Hong Kong) Mark McMahon	(England) Andy Thomson	4–7 7–5 7–3 7–0	
1995	(Scotland) Hugh Duff	(Australia) Ian Schuback	2–7 7–3 7–4 7–1	
1997	(England) Les Gillett	(Scotland) David Gourlay	7–5 7–0 6–7 7–4	
1998	(Scotland) David Gourlay (1/5)	(Wales) John Price	7–0 0–7 7–6 3–7 7–2	
1999	(Australia) Ian Schuback	(Scotland) David Gourlay	5–7 6–7 7–5 7–3 7–2	
2000	(Scotland) David Gourlay (2/5)	(Wales) John Price	7–2 7–2 0–7 5–7 7–3	
2001	(England) Ian Bond	(England) Greg Harlow	7–4 6–8 2–1	
2002	(Scotland) David Gourlay (3/5)	(Wales) Jason Greenslade	9–7 6–7 2–1	
2003	(England) Andy Thomson (3/3)	(England) Les Gillett	9–10 13–4 2–1	
2004	(England) Greg Harlow (1/3)	(Australia) David Gourlay	10–4 4–8 2–0	
2005	(England) Greg Harlow (2/3)	(Wales) Robert Weale	8–12 10–5 2–0	
2006	(England) Greg Harlow (3/3)	(Australia) David Gourlay	12–7 10–8	
2007	(Scotland) Paul Foster (1/2)	(Wales) Jason Greenslade	15–5 5–6 2–1	
2008	(Scotland) Darren Burnett	(Australia) Brett Wilkie	13–4 10–9	
2009–2012 not held
2013	(Scotland) Alex Marshall	(England) Robert Paxton	10–2 10–1	
2014	(Scotland) Paul Foster (2/2)	(Scotland) Alex Marshall	9–8 15–3	
2015	(England) Nick Brett	(Scotland) Alex Marshall	12–4 9–8	
2016	(Scotland) David Gourlay (4/5)	(England) Jamie Chestney	11–9 10–6	
2017	(England) Jamie Chestney	(Scotland) Stewart Anderson	9–4 8–6	
2018	(Scotland) David Gourlay (5/5)	(England) Greg Harlow	11–9 5–9 2–1	
not held since 2018

==== Welsh International Open ====
- Previous names: Welsh Masters / Welsh Grand Prix

Year	Winner	Runner-Up
2002	(England) Les Gillett	(Wales) Robert Weale
2003	(England) Tony Allcock	(Scotland) David Gourlay
2004	(Australia) Kelvin Kerkow (1/2)	(England) Andy Thomson
2005	(Australia) Kelvin Kerkow (2/2)	(Wales) Robert Weale
2006	(Wales) Jason Greenslade	(Australia) David Gourlay
2007	(Scotland) Paul Foster	(Wales) Robert Weale
2008	(England) Mark Royal (1/2)	(England) Greg Harlow
2009	(Wales) Robert Chisholm	(England) Simon Skelton
2010	(Scotland) Darren Burnett	(England) Simon Skelton
2011	(England) Mark Royal (2/2)	(Scotland) David Gourlay
2012	(Scotland) David Gourlay	(England) Greg Harlow
not held since 2013

==== World Matchplay ====
Year	Winner	Runner-Up
2007	(England) Greg Harlow	(England) Mervyn King
2008	(England) Andy Thomson	(Scotland) Alex Marshall
2009	(England) Mervyn King	(Australia) David Gourlay
2010	(England) Ian Bond	(Wales) Jason Greenslade
not held since 2010

== Statistics ==
=== Most successful bowlers (singles only) ===
Bowler	World Indoor Bowls Championships	The International Open	Scottish International Open	Welsh International Open	World Match Play	Total wins
(Scotland) Paul Foster	5	2	3	1	-	11
(Scotland) (Australia) David Gourlay	1	5	2	1	-	9
(England) Greg Harlow	1	3	3	-	1	8
(England) Andy Thomson	3	3	1	-	1	8
(Scotland) Alex Marshall	6	1	-	-	-	7
(England) David Bryant	3	2	1	-	-	6
(England) Tony Allcock	3	1	-	1	-	5
(Wales) John Price	1	4	-	-	-	5
(Scotland) Stewart Anderson	2	-	3	-	-	5
(Scotland) Richard Corsie	3	-	1	-	-	4
(England) Nick Brett	1	1	2	-	-	4

=== Youngest player ===
The youngest player is Desmond Lai from Hong Kong, who at the age of 15 (January 2024) took part in the 2024 World Bowls Indoor Championships.

== See also ==
- World Bowls Tour Awards
