= Terry Kung =

Lawn bowler from Hong Kong

Personal information
- Nationality: Hongkonger
Medal record
Representing (Hong Kong)
Asia Pacific Bowls Championships
Bronze medal – third place	2015 Christchurch	fours

Terry Kung is an international lawn bowler from Hong Kong.

== Bowls career ==
Kung was selected as part of the five man team by Hong Kong for the 2016 World Outdoor Bowls Championship, which was held in Avonhead, Christchurch, New Zealand.

He won a fours bronze medal (with Chun Yat Wong, Tony Cheung and Jason Choi), at the 2015 Asia Pacific Bowls Championships, held in Christchurch, New Zealand.
