= Derek Oliver =

Scottish lawn bowler

Personal information
- Nickname: Del Boy
- Nationality: British (Scottish)
- Born: 23 April 1984 (age 42) Edinburgh, Scotland

Sport
- Sport: Lawn & indoor bowls
- Club: East Lothian IBC; Cockenzie & Port Seton BC

Achievements and titles
- Highest world ranking: 46 (September 2024)
Medal record
Representing Scotland
World Outdoor Championships
Silver medal – second place	2023 Gold Coast	triples
Silver medal – second place	2023 Gold Coast	fours
Bronze medal – third place	2023 Gold Coast	team
Commonwealth Games
Gold medal – first place	2018 Gold Coast	triples
Gold medal – first place	2018 Gold Coast	fours
Atlantic Bowls Championships
Gold medal – first place	2019 Cardiff	fours
Silver medal – second place	2019 Cardiff	triples
World Singles Champion of Champions
Bronze medal – third place	2017 Sydney	Singles
European Championships
Silver medal – second place	2011 Portugal	mixed
Bronze medal – third place	2011 Portugal	team
Gold medal – first place	2013 Spain	pairs
Silver medal – second place	2013 Spain	mixed
Silver medal – second place	2013 Spain	team

Derek Oliver (born 23 April 1984) is a Scottish lawn and Indoor bowler.

== Profile ==
He lives in Cockenzie and plays for the East Lothian Indoor Bowls Club and the Cockenzie & Port Seton Bowls Club.

== Bowls career ==
In 2011, he won two medals at the European Bowls Championships in Portugal and three medals at the 2013 Championships in Spain. and the Scottish National Indoor Pairs.

In 2016, he won the Scottish National Bowls Championships.

In 2018, he was selected as part of the Scottish team for the 2018 Commonwealth Games on the Gold Coast in Queensland where he claimed two gold medals in the Triples with Darren Burnett and Ronnie Duncan and the Fours with Alex Marshall, Duncan and Paul Foster.

In 2019, he won the fours gold medal and triples silver medal at the Atlantic Bowls Championships and in 2020, he was selected for the 2020 World Outdoor Bowls Championship in Australia but the event was cancelled due to the COVID-19 pandemic.

In 2023, he was selected as part of the team to represent Scotland at the 2023 World Outdoor Bowls Championship. He participated in the men's triples and the men's fours events. In the triples, with Paul Foster and Alex Marshall he won the silver medal. One week later in the fours partnering Foster, Marshall and Jason Banks, the team won their group before reaching the final against Australia, where he won a second silver medal after losing 12–10.
