= John Orr (bowls, born 1995) =

Scottish lawn bowls player

Personal information
- Nationality: British (Scottish)
- Born: 1994 (age 31–32)

Sport
- Sport: Bowls
Medal record
Men's bowls
Representing Scotland
World Indoor Bowls Championships
Gold medal – first place	2019 Yarmouth	U25 singles

John Orr (born 1994), is a Scottish bowls player who won the World Under-25 title at the 2019 World Indoor Bowls Championship and is a current Scottish international.

He attended Calderglen High School and grew up in St Leonards, East Kilbride.

He has also won the Scottish indoor pairs in 2025 & triples in 2019 along with British isles indoor triples in 2020.
