= Kelly Packwood =

Welsh bowls player

Personal information
- Nationality: British (Welsh)
- Born: 10 August 1986 (age 39) Newport, Wales

Sport
- Sport: indoor and lawn bowls
- Club: Pontyfelin (outdoors); Torfaen (indoors)

Achievements and titles
- Highest world ranking: 34 (August 2024)
Medal record
Representing Wales
Welsh Nationals
Gold medal – first place	2009	pairs
Gold medal – first place	2016	triples

Kelly Packwood (born 1986) is a Welsh international lawn & indoor bowler.

== Bowls career ==
In 2012, she won the Hong Kong International Bowls Classic pairs title with Judith Wason.

Kelly represented Wales at the 2014 Commonwealth Games and only just missed out on a bronze medal losing out to South Africa in the bronze medal play off in the Women's triples with Kathy Pearce and Lisa Forey.

Her best performance indoors was reaching the semi-finals of the 2013 World Indoor Bowls Championship.

== Personal life ==
Her twin sister is fellow international bowler Kerry Packwood.
