= Daniel Pool =

Scottish bowls player

Personal information
- Nationality: British (Scottish)
- Born: 2000

Sport
- Club: Cumbria IBC (indoor); Annan BC (outdoor)
Medal record
Representing Scotland
World U25 Indoor Championships
Gold medal – first place	2022 Yarmouth	singles
Gold medal – first place	2023 Yarmouth	singles

Daniel Pool (born 1999) is a Scottish indoor bowler.

== Bowls career ==
In 2021, Pool was selected for the Scotland under 18s squad. He is twice the World Indoor U25 Champion after winning the title at the 2022 World Indoor Bowls Championship and the 2023 World Indoor Bowls Championship. He defeated fellow Scot Darren Weir in both finals.
