= Darren Weir =

Scottish bowls player

Personal information
- Nationality: British (Scottish)
- Born: 21 May 1999 (age 27)

Sport
- Sport: Lawn Bowls
- Club: Ardrossan IBC (Indoor); Troon BC (Outdoor)
Medal record
Representing Scotland
World Indoor Championships
Gold medal – first place	2024	U25 singles
European Championships
Silver medal – second place	2019 Guernsey	Pairs
Silver medal – second place	2019 Guernsey	Team
Silver medal – second place	2024 Ayr	Fours
Bronze medal – third place	2024 Ayr	Pairs

Darren Weir (born 1999) is a Scottish international lawn and indoor bowler.

== Bowls career ==
Weir won the Scottish under-18 title in 2016 and is a three times consecutive Scottish under-21 champion indoors (2018–20).

In 2019, Weir was selected for the European Bowls Championships, where he won two silver medals. He made his debut at the indoor World Championships during the 2021 World Indoor Bowls Championship.

He was twice defeated in the final of both the 2022 and 2023 Under 25 World Bowls Championship by fellow Scot Daniel Pool. In 2024, he won the Under-25 singles title at the 2024 World Indoor Bowls Championship. Weir won two medals in the pairs and fours at the 2024 European Bowls Championships.

== Personal life ==
He works as a Communications Officer for Bowls Scotland.
