= Kate Adams =

Scottish bowler

Personal information
- Nationality: Scotland
Medal record
Representing Scotland
World Indoor Bowls Championships
Gold medal – first place	1993 Guernsey	Women's singles

Kate Adams is a retired Scottish international indoor and lawn bowler.

Adams won the Women's singles at the 1993 World Indoor Bowls Championship defeating Jayne Roylance in the final.
