= Steven Glenn =

Canadian football player (born 1971)

Profile
- Positions: Long snapper, Linebacker

Personal information
- Born: May 4, 1971 (age 55); Ottawa, Ontario, Canada

Career information
- College: Ottawa

Career history
- 1996: Montreal Alouettes
- 1996–1998: BC Lions
- 1999–2001: Winnipeg Blue Bombers
- 2002–2004: Ottawa Renegades
- 2005: Saskatchewan Roughriders

Steven Glenn (born May 4, 1971 in Ottawa, Ontario) is a Canadian former professional football linebacker who played ten seasons in the Canadian Football League from 1996 to 2005 for five different teams.
