= Kerry Packwood =

Welsh bowls player

Personal information
- Nationality: British (Welsh)
- Born: 10 August 1986 (age 39) Newport, Wales

Sport
- Sport: indoor and lawn bowls
- Club: Islwyn (indoors)

Achievements and titles
- Highest world ranking: 32 (June 2024)

Kerry Packwood (born 1986) is a Welsh international lawn & indoor bowler.

== Bowls career ==
Kerry is a former indoor national champion and three times under-25 indoor national champion. Her best performance indoors was reaching the semi-finals of the 2010 World Indoor Bowls Championship, 2011 World Indoor Bowls Championship and 2013 World Indoor Bowls Championship.

== Personal life ==
Her twin sister is fellow international bowler Kelly Packwood.

Her former partner is Stewart Anderson, with whom she has a daughter.
