= Gary R Smith =

English bowler (born 1962)

Gary R. Smith
Personal information
- Nationality: England
- Born: 1 April 1962 (age 64)

Sport
- Sport: Indoor bowls
- Club: Durham IBC

Gary R Smith (born 1962) is an English international indoor bowler. He is not to be confused with the former international bowler Gary Smith.

== Career ==
He has been a bowler since 1998, and won the National Indoor title in 2008.

He played for the Stanley Indoor club before moving to play for Sunderland and then on to Durham.
