= Paul Foster (bowls) =

Scottish bowls player

Paul Foster MBE
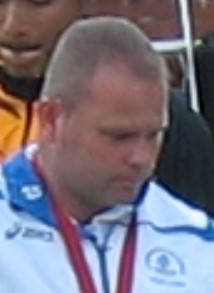
- Paul Foster at the medal award ceremony for the men's pairs at the 2014 Commonwealth Games in Glasgow

Personal information
- Nationality: British (Scottish)
- Born: 13 March 1973 (age 53) Irvine, Scotland

Sport
- Sport: Bowls
- Club: Troon Portland BC

Achievements and titles
- Highest world ranking: 1
Medal record
Representing Scotland
Lawn Bowls
World Outdoor Championships
Gold medal – first place	2012 Adelaide	Men's Pairs
Silver medal – second place	2012 Adelaide	Leonard Trophy
Bronze medal – third place	2016 Christchurch	Men's Pairs
Bronze medal – third place	2016 Christchurch	Men's Fours
Bronze medal – third place	2016 Christchurch	Leonard Trophy
Silver medal – second place	2023 Gold Coast	triples
Silver medal – second place	2023 Gold Coast	fours
Bronze medal – third place	2023 Gold Coast	Leonard Trophy
Commonwealth Games
Gold medal – first place	2006 Melbourne	Men's Pairs
Gold medal – first place	2014 Glasgow	Men's Pairs
Gold medal – first place	2014 Glasgow	Men's Fours
Gold medal – first place	2018 Gold Coast	Men's Fours
Silver medal – second place	2018 Gold Coast	Men's Pairs
Bronze medal – third place	2022 Birmingham	Men's Pairs
Bowls World Cup
Silver medal – second place	2025 Kuala Lumpur	men's pairs
Atlantic Bowls Championships
Gold medal – first place	2015 Paphos	Men's Team
Gold medal – first place	2019 Cardiff	Men's Fours
Gold medal – first place	2019 Cardiff	Men's Team
Silver medal – second place	2015 Paphos	Men's Pairs
Silver medal – second place	2015 Paphos	Men's Fours
Silver medal – second place	2019 Cardiff	Men's Pairs
Indoor Bowls
World Indoor Championships
Gold medal – first place	1998 Preston	Men's Singles
Gold medal – first place	2001 Yarmouth	Men's Singles
Gold medal – first place	2002 Yarmouth	Open Pairs
Gold medal – first place	2005 Yarmouth	Men's Singles
Gold medal – first place	2011 Yarmouth	Men's Singles
Gold medal – first place	2011 Yarmouth	Open Pairs
Gold medal – first place	2012 Yarmouth	Open Pairs
Gold medal – first place	2013 Yarmouth	Open Pairs
Gold medal – first place	2013 Yarmouth	Mxed Pairs
Gold medal – first place	2014 Yarmouth	Mxed Pairs
Gold medal – first place	2017 Yarmouth	Open Singles
Gold medal – first place	2019 Yarmouth	Open Pairs
Gold medal – first place	2022 Yarmouth	Mixed Pairs
Gold medal – first place	2026 Yarmouth	Open Pairs
Silver medal – second place	2001 Yarmouth	Men's Pairs
Silver medal – second place	2012 Yarmouth	Mixed Pairs
Silver medal – second place	2013 Yarmouth	Men's Singles
Silver medal – second place	2014 Yarmouth	Open Pairs
Silver medal – second place	2015 Yarmouth	Open Pairs
Silver medal – second place	2015 Yarmouth	Mixed Pairs
Silver medal – second place	2022 Yarmouth	Open Singles
Silver medal – second place	2023 Yarmouth	Mixed Pairs

Paul James Foster MBE (born 13 March 1973) is a multiple world bowls champion from Scotland. He plays at Troon Portland (Outdoor) & Ambassador Prestwick (Indoor) bowling clubs. Foster has won four Commonwealth Games gold medals and 13 world indoor titles. Foster returned to number 1 in the world rankings in 2026.

== Bowling career ==
=== Indoor career ===
Foster is the second most prolific winner of the World Indoor Championship singles title, behind six-times winner, pairs partner and close friend Alex Marshall. He has five wins from seven final appearances (in 1998, 2001, 2005, 2011 and 2017), with his two defeats coming in the 2013 final to Stewart Anderson and in the 2022 final to Les Gillett.

In addition, Foster has won another nine world indoor titles, bringing his career record to 14. He has won the pairs six times, once with Hugh Duff in 2002 and five times with Alex Marshall (2011, 2012, 2013, 2019 and 2026). He has won the Mixed Pairs title with Laura Thomas in 2013 and 2014 and with Alison Merrien in 2022.

He was the first bowler to win back-to-back major WBT titles and a record firth major WBT title in 2007, and in 2009, he added a record sixth, which made him the WBT world number one for the first time. So far, Foster has a record 11 WBT majors to his name.

=== Outdoor career ===
==== Commonwealth Games ====
Foster has four Commonwealth Games gold medals, two in pairs competition with his partner, Alex Marshall (in 2006 and 2014), and two in the fours event (in 2014 and 2018 both with Marshall too).

He won a pairs silver as part of the Scottish team for the 2018 Commonwealth Games with Alex Marshall. He then won a fourth career Commonwealth Games gold in the Fours with Marshall, Ronnie Duncan and Derek Oliver.

In 2022, he competed in the men's pairs and the men's fours at the 2022 Commonwealth Games. Partnering Marshall, they won the pairs bronze medal.

==== World Championships ====
During the 2012 World Outdoor Bowls Championship Foster and Marshall added the World Outdoor Pairs title, becoming the first players to win the indoor and outdoor pairs titles in the same year. In 2016, two more bronze medals were added, when he competed in the 2016 World Outdoor Bowls Championship in Christchurch.

In 2020, he was selected for the 2020 World Outdoor Bowls Championship in Australia but the event was cancelled due to the COVID-19 pandemic.

In 2023, he was selected as part of the team to represent Scotland at the 2023 World Outdoor Bowls Championship. He participated in the men's triples and the men's fours events. In the triples, with Alex Marshall and Derek Oliver, he won the silver medal. One week later in the fours partnering Marshall, Oliver and Jason Banks, the team won their group before reaching the final against Australia, where he won a second silver medal after losing 12–10.

==== Other ====
In 2025, Foster won his third Scottish National Bowls Championships, after winning the pairs with Colin Howie. In November 2025, he won the silver medal after reaching the final of the 2025 Bowls World Cup, where he partnered Jason Banks in the pairs event.

=== Awards ===
He was inducted into the World Bowls Tour (WBT) Hall of Fame in 2008, as well as winning Players' Player of the Year and Performance of the Year at the inaugural World Bowls Tour Awards in 2008. In 2010, Foster won WBT Player of the Year and Players' Player of the Year. In 2012, he was again voted WBT Player of the Year and Players' Player of the Year, also winning Shot of the Year He won another three awards in 2013, which were for Fans' Player of the Year, Performance of the Year, and Shot of the Year.

Foster was selected as SIBA Men's Indoor Player of the Year in 2017 and 2018. He was also inducted in to SIBA Hall of Fame in 2018. At the Team Scotland Sports Awards, Foster and Marshall were voted Team of the Year in 2019.

Foster was appointed Member of the Order of the British Empire (MBE) in the 2014 New Year Honours for services to bowls.

== Honours (wins and gold only) ==
Year	Achievement
2022	World Indoor Mixed Pairs champion
2019	World Indoor Open Pairs champion
2019	Atlantic Fours Gold medalist
2019	Atlantic Team Gold medalist
2018	BIIBC British Indoor Singles winner
2018	Commonwealth Fours Gold medalist
2017	BIIBC British Indoor Singles winner
2017	World Indoor Open Singles champion
2015	Atlantic Team Gold medalist
2014	WBT International Open winner
2014	Commonwealth Fours Gold medalist
2014	Commonwealth Pairs Gold medalist
2014	World Indoor Mixed Pairs champion
2013	World Indoor Pairs champion
2013	World Indoor Mixed Pairs champion
2012	World Outdoor Pairs champion
2012	World Indoor Pairs champion
2012	WBT Scottish International Open winner
2011	World Indoor Pairs champion
2011	World Indoor Singles champion
2011	Premier League winner
2009	WBT Scottish International Open winner
2009	Premier League winner
2008	Premier League winner
2007	WBT Welsh International Open winner
2007	WBT International Open winner
2007	Scottish National Bowls Championships Pairs winner
2006	Commonwealth Pairs Gold medalist
2005	World Indoor Singles champion
2004	Scottish National Bowls Championships Singles winner
2002	World Indoor Pairs champion
2001	World Indoor Singles champion
1999	BIIBC British Indoor Singles winner
1999	BIIBC Indoor Team (RB Hilton Trophy)
1998	World Indoor Singles champion
1998	WIBC Indoor Singles champion
1998	SIBA Scottish Indoor Singles winner
1997	SIBA Scottish Indoor Junior Singles winner
