= Ronnie Duncan =

Scottish international lawn bowler

Personal information
- Nationality: Scottish
- Born: 22 September 1983 (age 42) Edinburgh, Scotland

Sport
- Sport: Lawn bowls
- Club: Bonnyrigg BC
Medal record
Representing Scotland
World Outdoor Championships
Bronze medal – third place	2016 Christchurch	fours
Bronze medal – third place	2016 Christchurch	team
Commonwealth Games
Gold medal – first place	2018 Gold Coast	triples
Gold medal – first place	2018 Gold Coast	fours
Atlantic Bowls Championships
Gold medal – first place	2019 Cardiff	fours
Silver medal – second place	2019 Cardiff	triples
British Bowls Championships
Gold medal – first place	2025 Llandrindod Wells	fours

Ronald Duncan (born 22 September 1983) is a Scottish international lawn bowler.

== Bowls career ==
He won the indoor National Pairs Championship in 2014, partnering Colin Walker. During the 2016 World Indoor Bowls Championship pairs they were beaten finalists, losing out to fellow Scots Stewart Anderson and Darren Burnett.

Duncan won a bronze medal in the fours at the 2016 World Outdoor Bowls Championship in Christchurch with Alex Marshall, Paul Foster and Iain McLean.

In 2018 he was selected as part of the Scottish team for the 2018 Commonwealth Games on the Gold Coast in Queensland where he claimed two gold medals in the Triples with Darren Burnett and Derek Oliver and the Fours with Marshall, Oliver and Foster.

Once again partnering Colin Walker the pair reached the semi-finals during the 2019 World Indoor Bowls Championship. Also during 2019 he won the fours gold medal and triples silver medal at the Atlantic Bowls Championships

In 2020 he was selected for the 2020 World Outdoor Bowls Championship in Australia.

In 2024, Duncan won his first Scottish National Bowls Championships, by winning the fours with Bonnyrigg BC and subsequently won the fours at the 2025 British Championships.
