= Alison Merrien =

British lawn bowler (born 1974)

Alison Merrien MBE
Personal information
- Full name: Alison Jayne Merrien
- Nationality: British (Channel Islander)
- Born: 28 November 1974 (age 51) Guernsey
- Height: 1.64 m (5 ft 5 in) (2006)
- Weight: 74 kg (163 lb) (2006)
- Spouse: Ian Merrien

Sport
- Club: Guernsey Bowls Stadium

Achievements and titles
- Highest world ranking: 11 (June 2024)
Medal record
Representing Guernsey
Commonwealth Games
Silver medal – second place	2026 Glasgow	singles
World Indoor Bowls Championships
Gold medal – first place	2011 Yarmouth	singles
Gold medal – first place	2011 Yarmouth	mixed pairs
Silver medal – second place	2019 Yarmouth	singles
Gold medal – first place	2022 Yarmouth	mixed pairs
Silver medal – second place	2022 Yarmouth	singles
Silver medal – second place	2023 Yarmouth	mixed pairs
World Cup Singles
Gold medal – first place	2008 Warilla	singles
Silver medal – second place	2011 Warilla	singles
Gold medal – first place	2012 Warilla	singles
Silver medal – second place	2013 Warilla	singles
Silver medal – second place	2014 Warilla	singles
World Champion of Champions
Silver medal – second place	2003 Moama	singles
Gold medal – first place	2007 Warilla	singles
WB Indoor Championships
Gold medal – first place	2022 Bristol	mixed pairs
Bronze medal – third place	2025 Aberdeen	mixed pairs

Alison Jayne Merrien MBE (born 28 November 1974) is an indoor bowls player from Saint Peter Port, Guernsey. She reached a career high ranking of world number 11 in June 2024.

== Bowls career ==
By virtue of winning her national title she qualified to represent Guernsey at the World Singles Champion of Champions in 2007 where she defeated Siti Zalina Ahmad in the final to win the gold medal.

Merrien won double gold in the women's singles defeating Karen Murphy and the mixed pairs with Simon Skelton the 2011 World Indoor Bowls Championship. She won a third medal eight years later in 2019 losing out to Julie Forrest of Scotland in the final. In 2022, she finally claimed a third title when winning the mixed pairs with Paul Foster and also reached the women's singles final. She also reached the mixed pairs final in 2023.

In the southern hemisphere equivalent the World Cup Singles she has won two titles in 2008 and 2012 and has finished runner up on three more occasions. In 2022, Merrien won the mixed pairs at the inaugural World Bowls Indoor Championships, partnering Stewart Anderson, they defeated Michael Stepney and Claire Anderson in the final.

In addition she has claimed three IIBC singles titles in 2009, 2011 & 2015 and the mixed pairs Championship in 2001 and 2004.

Nationally she has won the British Isles Indoor Women's Singles Championship in 2002, 2006, 2008, 2009, 2012 and 2015 and the British Isles Indoor Women's Pairs Championship in 2015

Merrien was Guernsey's 2026 Commonwealth Games opening ceremony flagbearer. On the final day of the Games, she won the silver medal in the women's singles, losing to England's Katherine Rednall in the final.

== Awards ==
Merrien was appointed a Member of the Order of the British Empire (MBE) for services to bowls in the 2012 New Year Honours, and is married to Ian Merrien who is also a successful bowls player.
