= Colin Walker (bowls) =

Personal information
- Nationality: British (Scottish)
- Born: 3 November 1975 (age 50)

Sport
- Sport: Lawn & indoor bowls
- Club: Midlothian (indoors); Pathhead (outdoors)
Medal record
Men's bowls
Representing Scotland
World Indoor Championships
Silver medal – second place	2016 Yarmouth	Open pairs
European Championships
Gold medal – first place	2013 Spain	pairs
Silver medal – second place	2013 Spain	mixed
Silver medal – second place	2013 Spain	team

Colin Walker (born 3 November 1975) is a Scottish international lawn and Indoor bowler.

== Bowls career ==
In 2013, he won three medals at the European Bowls Championships in Spain.

He won the National Pairs Championship in 2014 at the National Championships partnering Ronnie Duncan. During the 2016 World Indoor Bowls Championship pairs they were beaten finalists, losing out to fellow Scots Stewart Anderson and Darren Burnett. The pair also reached the semi-finals during the 2019 World Indoor Bowls Championship.

Significant career wins include the 2018 Scottish Masters.
