= Karen Murphy (bowls) =

Australian bowls player

Personal information
- Nationality: Australian
- Born: 18 December 1974 (age 51) Kiama, Australia
Medal record
Representing Australia
World Outdoor Championships
Silver medal – second place	2000 Moama	pairs
Bronze medal – third place	2000 Moama	singles
Silver medal – second place	2000 Moama	team
Bronze medal – third place	2004 Leamington Spa	pairs
Silver medal – second place	2004 Leamington Spa	team
Gold medal – first place	2008 Christchurch	fours
Bronze medal – third place	2008 Christchurch	pairs
Gold medal – first place	2008 Christchurch	team
Gold medal – first place	2012 Adelaide	singles
Gold medal – first place	2012 Adelaide	triples
Gold medal – first place	2012 Adelaide	team
Gold medal – first place	2016 Christchurch	singles
Gold medal – first place	2016 Christchurch	team
Commonwealth Games
Silver medal – second place	1998 Kuala Lumpur	fours
Silver medal – second place	2002 Manchester	singles
Gold medal – first place	2006 Melbourne	pairs
Silver medal – second place	2014 Glasgow	triples
World Indoor Bowls Championships
Silver medal – second place	2011 Yarmouth	singles
Gold medal – first place	2012 Yarmouth	singles
Asia Pacific Bowls Championships
Gold medal – first place	1997 Warilla	triples
Gold medal – first place	1997 Warilla	fours
Gold medal – first place	1999 Kuala Lumpur	pairs
Gold medal – first place	2001 Melbourne	fours
Bronze medal – third place	2003 Brisbane	singles
Gold medal – first place	2005 Melbourne	pairs
Gold medal – first place	2007 Christchurch	pairs
Silver medal – second place	2007 Christchurch	singles
Bronze medal – third place	2009 Kuala Lumpur	pairs
Silver medal – second place	2011 Adelaide	fours
Bronze medal – third place	2011 Adelaide	pairs
Gold medal – first place	2015 Christchurch	singles
Gold medal – first place	2015 Christchurch	pairs

Karen Anne Murphy AM (born 18 December 1974) is an Australian international lawn bowler and indoor bowler.

== Bowls career ==
=== World championships ===
After winning pairs silver and singles bronze in Moama in 2000 and pairs bronze in 2004, Murphy went on to win World Championship golds. Murphy won the 2008 World Outdoor Bowls Championship in the fours, 2012 World Outdoor Bowls Championship in the triples and twice in the singles at the 2012 World Outdoor Bowls Championship and the 2016 World Outdoor Bowls Championship. She successfully defended her title in the singles at the 2016 World Outdoor Bowls Championship in Christchurch after defeating Lesley Doig in the final. This achievement is generally agreed to have elevated her to being the best female bowler since Margaret Johnston.

=== Commonwealth Games ===
She has won gold medals at the 2006 Commonwealth Games in the pairs. In addition she has won three Commonwealth Games silver medals, the most recent being in the Women's triples at the 2014 Commonwealth Games.

=== Asia Pacific Championships ===
She has won a remarkable 13 medals at the Asia Pacific Bowls Championships, of which no less than eight have been gold in colour.

=== Nationals ===
In 2023, Murphy won the Australian National Bowls Championships fours title with Jamie-Lee Worsnop, Ellen Falkner and Ellen Ryan, to add to her three Australian Open titles.

=== Indoors ===
In 2012, she also won the World Indoor Bowls Championship title, a fine achievement bearing in mind that she does not compete every year in the event held in England.

== Awards ==
She has also been a guest commentator during the World Indoor Bowls Championships for the BBC. She was a Director for World Bowls from 2014-2018.

Murphy was awarded Member of the Order of Australia (AM) in the 2021 Australia Day Honours, for "For significant service to lawn bowls as an elite player at the international level."

In 2024, she was inducted into the Sport Australia Hall of Fame.
