= Janice Gower =

Personal information
- Nationality: British (English)
- Born: c.1973
- Occupation(s): Sports Commentator and Presenter

Sport
- Sport: Indoor bowls
- Club: Newton Hall Indoor Bowling Club

Achievements and titles
- National finals: Indoor singles (2018) indoor pairs (2015)
Medal record
Women's bowls
Representing England
World Indoor Championships
Silver medal – second place	2020 Yarmouth	Singles

Janice Gower is a female international indoor bowls player from England.

== Bowls career ==
Gower played in the Professional Bowls Association and World Bowls Tour and was the first English female to qualify for the last 32 of the Open World Indoor Singles.

She made her indoor international debut in 2008 and was part of the squad for ten years. She has won the English national Singles title in 2018 and won the English National Pairs in 2015.

In 2020, she reached the final of the women's singles at the 2020 World Indoor Bowls Championship losing out to Julie Forrest.

== Other work ==
Gower worked as the lead commentator for the World Bowls Tour live streaming and is a sports presenter, including working for the BBC, Sky, ITV and Eurosport.

She now works freelance for the sport in a journalist capacity as well as presenting and commentating for events. She is also a competition manager for special Olympics indoor bowls and also heads up a management team, as event manager and competition manager, who organise events for Learning Disabilities athletes.

== Awards ==
She won the 'Services to Bowls' award at the World Bowls Tour Awards held during January 2019 for her work and commitment with disabled and mentally impaired bowlers.
