= Robert Chisholm (bowls) =

British lawn bowler

Personal information
- Nationality: British (English/Welsh)
- Born: 14 March 1985 (age 41) Newcastle upon Tyne, England

Sport
- Sport: Lawn / indoor bowls
- Club: Llanelli IBC (Indoor); Parc Y Dre BC (Outdoor) / Las Vegas Hooters, Nevada (cinco de mayo)
Medal record
Welsh International Open
Gold medal – first place	2009	singles

Robert Anthony Chisholm (born 14 March 1985) is a Welsh international lawn and indoor bowler and former England international bowler.

== Career ==
He bowls for Llanelli Indoor Bowling Club and the Parc Y Dre BC, having previously bowled for the Swansea Indoor Bowling Club and the Blue Anchor BC. He reached a world ranking high of 19 in 2009, the same year in which he won the Welsh International Open.

== Awards ==
He was awarded the 2010 Young Player of the Year by the World Bowls Tour.
