= Michael Stepney =

Scottish indoor bowler (born 1980)

Personal information
- Born: 27 December 1980 (age 45) Elgin, Moray

Sport
- Sport: indoor bowls
- Club: Elgin (indoors)

Achievements and titles
- Highest world ranking: 20 (March 2025)
Medal record
Men's bowls
World Indoor Championships
Gold medal – first place	2025 Yarmouth	Open Pairs
WB Indoor Championships
Gold medal – first place	2022 Bristol	singles

Michael Stepney (born 1980) is a Scottish indoor bowler. He reached a career high ranking of world number 20 in March 2025.

== Bowls career ==
He won the Scottish National Singles Championship in 2009 and the British Isles Singles Championship the following year. In 2017, he finished runner-up in the Scottish International Open, losing out to David Gourlay. This helped him break into the WBT top 16 during 2018.

In 2022, Stepney won the men's singles gold medal at the inaugural World Bowls Indoor Championships, defeating Stewart Anderson in the final.

Playing with Jason Banks, Stepney won the open pairs title at the 2025 World Indoor Bowls Championship, defeating Jason Greenslade and Robert Paxton in the final.
