= Nick Brett =

English lawn bowler (born 1974)

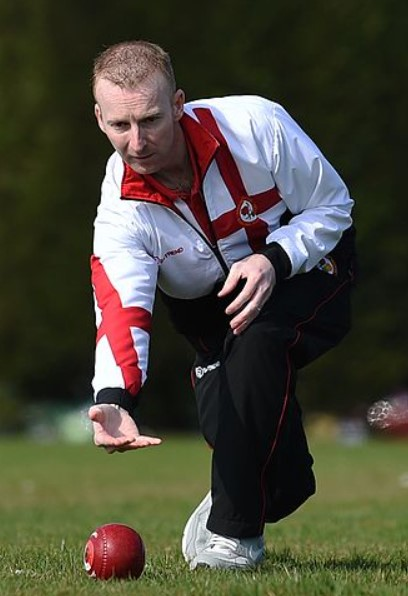
- Brett in 2015

Personal information
- Born: 14 May 1974 (age 52) Peterborough, England

Sport
- Sport: Bowls
- Club: Brampton BC; Huntingdon IBC

Achievements and titles
- Highest world ranking: 19 (August 2024)
Medal record
Representing England
Men's Bowls
World Outdoor Championships
Bronze medal – third place	2023 Gold Coast	triples
Commonwealth Games
Gold medal – first place	2022 Birmingham	triples
Bronze medal – third place	2022 Birmingham	fours
Silver medal – second place	2026 Glasgow	pairs
World Indoor Bowls Championships
Gold medal – first place	2014	pairs
Gold medal – first place	2016	singles
Gold medal – first place	2017	mixed pairs
Gold medal – first place	2020	pairs
Gold medal – first place	2020	mixed pairs
Gold medal – first place	2023	pairs
Gold medal – first place	2024	mixed pairs
British Isles Championships
Gold medal – first place	2000	singles
National championships
Gold medal – first place	1999	singles
Gold medal – first place	2022	pairs

Nick Brett (born 14 May 1974) is an English lawn and indoor bowler. He reached a career high ranking of world number 19 in August 2024.

== Bowls career ==
Brett bowls for the Huntingdon indoor bowls club and Brampton outdoor bowls club. He was ranked the indoor world number 1 in 2015 and 2016. and also won an outdoors National Title in 1999 and subsequent singles at the British Isles Bowls Championships in 2000.

Brett's greatest achievement before 2016 was winning the 2014 World Indoor Bowls Championship Pairs title partnering Greg Harlow. It was during the 2016 World Indoor Bowls Championship that Brett became the World Singles Champion for the first time beating Robert Paxton in a competitive final.

Brett followed up his 2016 success by winning the mixed pairs title at the 2017 World Indoor Bowls Championship with Claire Johnston of Scotland. He then joined an exclusive group of players who have won five or more world indoor titles after winning both the open pairs and mixed pairs at the 2020 World Indoor Bowls Championship and he narrowly failed to become the first player to win the treble after losing to Paxton in the open singles final. Other major indoor wins include the 2015 International Open and the 2013 and 2014 Scottish International Open.

In 2020, he was selected for the 2020 World Outdoor Bowls Championship in Australia but the event was cancelled due to the COVID-19 pandemic. World ranked number one indoors he was unable to participate in the 2021 World Indoor Bowls Championship because he broke his arm following an accident playing golf.

In 2022, he competed in the men's triples and the men's fours at the 2022 Commonwealth Games. The team of Brett, Louis Ridout and Jamie Chestney won the triples gold medal and in the fours he also secured a bronze medal. The success during 2022 continued when he secured a second national title, winning the 2022 pairs with Lewis Baker.

At the 2023 World Indoor Bowls Championship, Brett won the Open Pairs with Greg Harlow again, defeating Jason Greenslade and Michael Stepney in the final. It was Brett's sixth title over all disciplines.

In 2023, he was selected as part of the team to represent England at the 2023 World Outdoor Bowls Championship. He participated in the men's triples and the men's fours events. In the triples with Jamie Walker and Louis Ridout, he won a bronze medal.

Brett started 2024 in good form winning the 2024 World Indoor Bowls Championship mixed pairs with Julie Forrest, as the pair bowled together for the first time in the Championships.

At the 2026 Commonwealth Games, he combined with Jamie Walker to win the silver medal in the men's pairs, losing to Northern Ireland's Gary Kelly and Adam McKeown on a tiebreak end in the final.

== Personal life ==
Brett is a supervisor by trade and is married with two children. Due to injury in 2021 he was unable to compete in the World Indoor Championships and consequently joined the commentary team for the event.
