= Alex Marshall (bowls) =

Scottish bowls player (born 1967)

Alex Marshall MBE
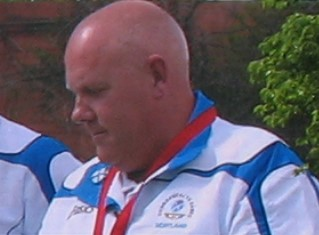
- Marshall at the 2014 at the Commonwealth Games

Personal information
- Nationality: British (Scottish)
- Born: 8 February 1967 (age 59) Edinburgh, Scotland

Sport
- Sport: Bowls
Medal record
Representing Scotland
Event	1st	2nd	3rd
World Outdoor Championships	7	6	4
World Indoor Championships	15	6	0
Commonwealth Games	5	1	0
Atlantic Championships	3	3	0
Hong Kong Classic	3	0	0
Lawn bowls
World Outdoor Championships
Gold medal – first place	1992 Worthing	Men's Pairs
Gold medal – first place	1992 Worthing	Men's Fours
Gold medal – first place	1992 Worthing	Leonard Trophy
Gold medal – first place	1996 Adelaide	Leonard Trophy
Silver medal – second place	1996 Adelaide	Men's Pairs
Gold medal – first place	2000 Johannesburg	Men's Pairs
Silver medal – second place	2000 Johannesburg	Leonard Trophy
Gold medal – first place	2004 Ayr	Leonard Trophy
Silver medal – second place	2004 Ayr	Men's Singles
Gold medal – first place	2012 Adelaide	Men's Pairs
Silver medal – second place	2012 Adelaide	Leonard Trophy
Bronze medal – third place	2012 Adelaide	Men's Fours
Bronze medal – third place	2016 Christchurch	Men's Pairs
Bronze medal – third place	2016 Christchurch	Men's Fours
Bronze medal – third place	2016 Christchurch	Leonard Trophy
Silver medal – second place	2023 Gold Coast	triples
Silver medal – second place	2023 Gold Coast	fours
Bronze medal – third place	2023 Gold Coast	Leonard Trophy
Commonwealth Games
Gold medal – first place	2002 Manchester	Men's Pairs
Gold medal – first place	2006 Melbourne	Men's Pairs
Gold medal – first place	2014 Glasgow	Men's Pairs
Gold medal – first place	2014 Glasgow	Men's Fours
Gold medal – first place	2018 Gold Coast	Men's Fours
Silver medal – second place	2018 Gold Coast	Men's pairs
Bronze medal – third place	2022 Birmingham	Men's pairs
Atlantic Championships
Gold medal – first place	2015 Paphos	Men's Team
Silver medal – second place	2015 Paphos	Men's Pairs
Silver medal – second place	2015 Paphos	Men's Fours
Gold medal – first place	2019 Cardiff	Men's Fours
Gold medal – first place	2019 Cardiff	Men's Team
Silver medal – second place	2019 Cardiff	Men's Pairs

Alex "Tattie" Marshall MBE (born 8 February 1967) is a Scottish bowls player.

== Career ==
Marshall plays at Gifford Bowls Club (outdoor) and East Lothian Indoor Bowling Club. He began bowling at the age of eight supported by both his father and grandfather and first represented his country in 1988.

He is a record-breaking six-time World Indoor Singles Champion and also has eight World Indoor Pairs titles to his credit (six Open Pairs and two Mixed Pairs). He has won seven World Outdoor Championship Gold medals (Pairs in 1992, 2000 and 2012, Fours in 1992, and Team in 1992, 1996 and 2004).

His other achievements include four Commonwealth Games Gold medals (Pairs in 2002, 2006 and 2014, and Fours in 2014), one Atlantic Games Team Gold (in 2015), and three Hong Kong International Classic Pairs titles (in 1993, 1996 and 2002).

In 2012, Marshall and Paul Foster became the first pair to win the World Indoor and Outdoor Pairs titles in the same year. In 2013, he claimed his first major WBT title outside the World Indoor title at the UK International Open. In 2014, he won the Australian Premier League with the Murray Steamers and was named Most Valuable Player at the end of the season. Marshall would also offer a challenge to Short mat bowls players from England, Scotland, Wales, and Ireland aiming to defeat them in a game of short mat bowls. Marshall would defeat Scotland's Lawrence Moffat and Wales' Ceri Jones; but would lose to Wales' multiple time world champion Steven Williams, and Irelands Dessie Hamilton. In the rubber match, he would draw against England's Dominic Reed. However, Reed would win the game's extra end.

In 2016, two more bronze medals were added when he competed in the 2016 World Outdoor Bowls Championship in Christchurch. He added a pairs silver as part of the Scottish team for the 2018 Commonwealth Games with Paul Foster. He then set a gold medal record for Scotland by winning the gold medal in the Fours with Ronnie Duncan, Derek Oliver and Paul Foster.

The success continued in 2019, when he won another open pairs at the 2019 World Indoor Bowls Championship, this was a fourth with Paul Foster and sixth in total. This was his 14th World indoor gold medal.

In 2020, he was selected for the 2020 World Outdoor Bowls Championship in Australia but the event was cancelled due to the COVID-19 pandemic. In 2022, he competed in the men's pairs and the men's fours at the 2022 Commonwealth Games. Partnering Foster, they won the pairs bronze medal.

In 2023, he was selected as part of the team to represent Scotland at the 2023 World Outdoor Bowls Championship. He participated in the men's triples and the men's fours events. In the triples, with Paul Foster and Derek Oliver, he won the silver medal. One week later in the fours partnering Foster, Oliver and Jason Banks, the team won their group before reaching the final against Australia, where he won a second silver medal after losing 12–10.

Marshall won a seventh world indoor pairs title (and sixth with Foster) at the 2026 World Indoor Bowls Championship, defeating fellow Scots Stewart Anderson and Darren Burnett. Victory moved Foster and Marshall to one win behind England's Tony Allcock and David Bryant, who won the title six times between 1986 and 1992.

== Awards ==
Marshall was appointed a Member of the Order of the British Empire (MBE) in the 2007 New Year Honours for services to bowls.

== World Indoor Performance timeline ==
	1994	1995	1996	1997	1998	1999	2000	2001	2002	2003	2004	2005	2006	2007	2008	2009
Men's Singles	DNE	R2	DNE	DNE	DNE	W	SF	SF	QF	W	W	R2	R2	W	W	R2
Open Pairs	QF	W	SF	DNE	R1	DNE	W	R1	SF	SF	QF	QF	SF	R1	SF	R1
Mixed Pairs	Not held										W	DNE	QF	SF	RU	SF

	2010	2011	2012	2013	2014	2015	2016	2017	2018	2019	2020	2021	2022	2023	2024	2025	2026
Men's Singles	R2	RU	R1	R2	QF	W	SF	R2	R1	R2	R2	R2	SF	R1	RU	R2	R2
Open Pairs	QF	W	W	W	RU	RU	SF	QF	QF	W	RU	QF	QF	QF	DNE	R2	W
Mixed Pairs	W	R1	R1	DNE	QF	SF	RU	QF	QF	DNE	DNE	DNE	DNE	DNE	DNE	DNE	DNE

Men's Doubles partners = 2000 - 2003 David Gourlay, 2004 - 2017 & 2019 Paul Foster, 2018 Neil Furman
Mixed Doubles partners = 2004 Amy Monkhouse, 2006 Laura Hawryszko, 2007 Alison Merrien, 2008 Caroline Brown, 2009 Debbie Stavrou, 2010 - 2011 Carol Ashby, 2012 Janice Gower, 2014 Alison Merrien, 2015 - 2016 Julie Forrest.
