= Greg Harlow =

English lawn and indoor bowls player (born 1968)

Personal information
- Nationality: British (English)
- Born: 6 July 1968 (age 58) Ely, Cambridgeshire, England
Medal record
Representing England
World Indoor Bowls Championships
Gold medal – first place	2007	mixed pairs
Gold medal – first place	2010	singles
Gold medal – first place	2014	pairs
Gold medal – first place	2020	pairs
Gold medal – first place	2023	pairs

Greg Harlow (born 6 July 1968) is an English international indoor bowls player.

== Bowls career ==
=== World Indoor Championships ===
Born in Ely, Greg Harlow rose to the world ranking of number one indoors during 2006. Despite being world number one it was not until 2007 that he won his first title at the World Indoor Bowls Championships. That victory was the mixed pairs at the 2007 World Indoor Bowls Championship with Jo Morris.

His finest moment arrived when winning the 2010 World Indoor Bowls Championship where he defeated Stewart Anderson of Scotland in the final. A third title was won when he won the men's pairs with Nick Brett at the 2014. He repeated the success of winning the pairs with Brett again, when they won the 2020 World Indoor Bowls Championship open pairs title.

His world ranking has remained high retaining the world number ranking in 2012, 2017 and 2018 but had been unlucky in the World indoors by finishing runner-up on seven occasions.

At the 2021 World Indoor Bowls Championship, his open pairs partner Ellen Falkner became the first female player to reach the final of an open event. Harlow continued to have a successful tournament by reaching the Open Singles final but was beaten by an in-form Mark Dawes.

At the 2023 World Indoor Bowls Championship, Harlow won the Open Pairs with Nick Brett again, defeating Jason Greenslade and Michael Stepney in the final. It was Harlow's fifth title over all disciplines.

=== Other events ===
Other career achievements include winning the International Open three years in a row (2004, 2005, 2006), the Scottish International Open three times in 2008, 2015 & 2016, the Welsh Masters Championship two years running 1999 & 2000 and the World Matchplay in 2007.

== Personal life ==
He has been a Bowls Ambassador and manager for Potters Leisure Resort, retiring from the post in Autumn 2025. He was previously a work associate of Mark Royal.
