= Simon Skelton =

English bowls player (born 1972)

Personal information
- Nationality: British (English)
- Born: 7 April 1972 (age 54)
Medal record
Representing England
Commonwealth Games
Gold medal – first place	2002	Men's fours
World Indoor Bowls Championships
Gold medal – first place	2011	Mixed pairs
Gold medal – first place	2015	Men's pairs
Silver medal – second place	2019	Men's Singles

Simon Skelton is an English international lawn and indoor bowler.

== Bowls career ==
Skelton bowls for the Nottingham indoor club and Stute outdoor bowls club. During the 2002 Commonwealth Games he was part of the fours that won the gold medal with John Ottaway, Robert Newman and David Holt.

In addition to his international achievements he also won a National Championship title in 2009 representing Derbyshire and Stute BC.

In 2011 he won the mixed pairs title at the 2011 World Indoor Bowls Championship with Alison Merrien and in 2015 World Indoor Bowls Championship he won the open pairs title with Robert Paxton.

He reached the final of the open singles at the 2019 World Indoor Bowls Championship as a qualifier but lost to Stewart Anderson in the final. He also lost to Anderson in the final of the 2019 Scottish International Open.
