= Mark Royal =

English lawn and indoor bowls player

Personal information
- Nationality: English
- Born: 18 January 1975 (age 51)

Sport
- Sport: Lawn & indoor bowls
- Club: Rookery (outdoors); Mid Suffolk (indoors)
Medal record
Men's bowls
Representing England
English Nationals
Gold medal – first place	2003	cofc
Silver medal – second place	2021	cofc

Mark Royal (born 1975) is an English international lawn and indoor bowler.

== Bowls career ==
=== Outdoors ===
Royal won the Men's Champion of Champions singles title in 2003, at the National Championships. In 2021, he reached the final of the event again, only to lose out to Jamie Chestney 21–11.

=== Indoors ===
Indoors he reached a career high world indoor ranking of 2 in 2009 and has been in the worlds top 16 since 2003.

Major successes include winning the Welsh Open in 2008 and 2011.

Mark bowls with Drakes Pride 4 Heavy.

== Awards ==
He was awarded the 2009 Players Player of the Year and Performance of the Year by the World Bowls Tour.

== Personal life ==
By trade he is a Director of Jack and Bowl. He is married with three children and formerly worked with Potters Leisure Resort and its manager Greg Harlow.
