= Darren Burnett =

Scottish bowls player (born 1976)

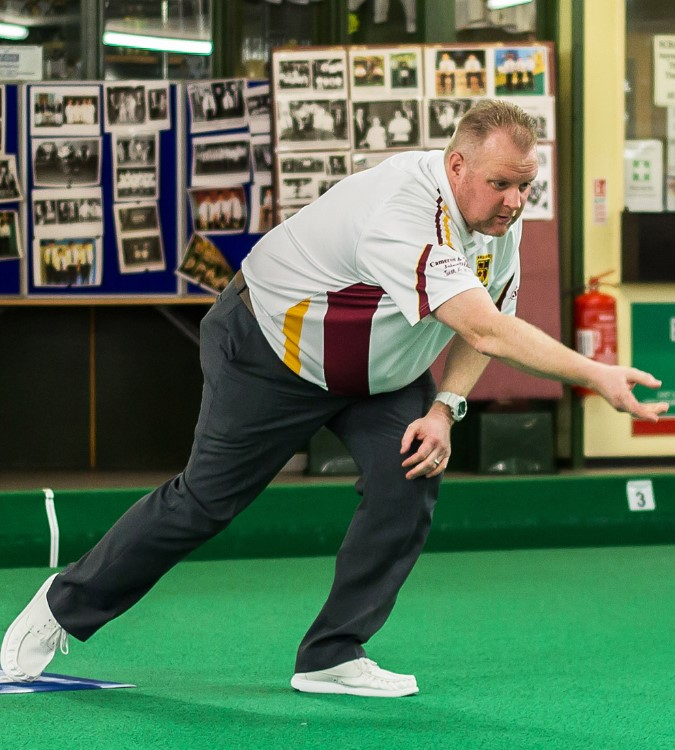
- Burnett in 2016

Personal information
- Full name: Darren William Burnett
- Born: 27 May 1976 (age 50) Arbroath, Scotland

Sport
- Sport: Lawn bowls
- Club: Arbroath & District (indoor); Arbroath BC (outdoors)
Medal record
Representing Scotland
World Outdoor Championships
Silver medal – second place	2008 Christchurch	Men's pairs
Gold medal – first place	2012 Adelaide	Men's triples
Bronze medal – third place	2012 Adelaide	Men's fours
Silver medal – second place	2012 Adelaide	Men's team
Bronze medal – third place	2016 Christchurch	Men's singles
Bronze medal – third place	2016 Christchurch	Men's team
Commonwealth Games
Gold medal – first place	2014 Glasgow	Men's singles
Gold medal – first place	2018 Gold Coast	Men's triples
World Indoor Bowls Championships
Gold medal – first place	2014 Yarmouth	Singles
Gold medal – first place	2016 Yarmouth	Open pairs
Gold medal – first place	2016 Yarmouth	Mixed pairs
Gold medal – first place	2022 Yarmouth	Open pairs
Gold medal – first place	2024 Yarmouth	Open pairs
Atlantic Bowls Championships
Bronze medal – third place	2007 Ayr	pairs
Gold medal – first place	2015 Paphos	triples
Silver medal – second place	2015 Paphos	singles
Silver medal – second place	2019 Cardiff	singles
Silver medal – second place	2019 Cardiff	triples
British Championships
Gold medal – first place	2003, 2006	singles
Gold medal – first place	2026	triples

Darren William Burnett (born 27 May 1976 in Arbroath) is a Scottish lawn bowler and indoor bowler.

== Bowls career ==
=== Commonwealth Games ===
At the 2014 Commonwealth Games, he won a gold medal in men's singles after defeating Canada's Ryan Bester. In 2018 he was selected as part of the Scottish team for the 2018 Commonwealth Games on the Gold Coast in Queensland where he claimed another gold medal in the Triples with Ronnie Duncan and Derek Oliver.

In 2022, he competed in the men's triples and the men's fours at the 2022 Commonwealth Games.

=== World Championships ===
He has won four medals at the World Bowls Championship. The first came during the 2008 World Outdoor Bowls Championship in Christchurch when he won a silver medal and then four years later won a gold and bronze during the 2012 World Outdoor Bowls Championship in the pairs and triples. The fourth medal was in the singles at the 2016 World Outdoor Bowls Championship in Christchurch. In 2020 he was selected for the 2020 World Outdoor Bowls Championship in Australia.

=== World Indoor Championships ===
He has a good record indoors and was the singles world champion in 2014. Burnett enjoyed a very successful 2016 World Indoor Bowls Championship after securing both the Open Pairs title with Stewart Anderson and the Mixed Pairs title with Katherine Rednall. Burnett claimed a fourth title when winning the open pairs for the second time with Stewart Anderson in 2022. He won an all-Scottish final in the open pairs in 2024, partnering Stewart Anderson again.

=== Nationals ===
In 2005, Burnett equalled the record for wins in the Scottish National men's singles championship, winning his third to join Robert Sprot, David Dall and Joseph Black. The record stood until 2025 when Iain McLean won a fourth. He subsequently won the singles at the British Isles Bowls Championships in 2003 and 2006.

In 2025, Burnett won his fourth National title, after winning the triples with Peter Thomson and Andy Furye.

=== Other events ===
Other major wins include winning the World Singles Champion of Champions in 2006, the 1991 & 2001 Scottish International Open, the 2008 International Open, the 2010 Welsh International Open.

In June 2023, he announced his retirement from international competitions.

== Personal life ==
He works as a policeman in Arbroath, Scotland and is married with two children.
