= Jason Greenslade =

Wales and Guernsey international indoor and lawn bowler

Personal information
- Full name: Jason John Greenslade
- Nationality: Welsh
- Born: 6 March 1970 (age 56) Penarth, Wales

Sport
- Club: Sully (indoor); Dinas Powys (outdoor)

Achievements and titles
- Highest world ranking: 28 (March 2025)
Medal record
Representing Wales
World Outdoor Championships
Bronze medal – third place	2004 Ayr	Men's pairs
Commonwealth Games
Bronze medal – third place	2002 Manchester	Men's fours
World Indoor Bowls Championships
Silver medal – second place	2003 Yarmouth	Men's pairs
Silver medal – second place	2007 Yarmouth	Men's pairs
Silver medal – second place	2012 Yarmouth	Men's singles
Gold medal – first place	2017 Yarmouth	Open pairs
Silver medal – second place	2025 Yarmouth	Open pairs
Atlantic Bowls Championships
Gold medal – first place	2009 Johannesburg	Men's pairs
Bronze medal – third place	2009 Johannesburg	Men's singles
British Isles Championships
Gold medal – first place	2015	singles
WB Indoor Championships
Gold medal – first place	2024 Guernsey	singles

Jason John Greenslade (born 6 March 1970) is an international indoor and lawn bowler. Originally representing Wales, after moving to Guernsey in 2022 he later represented them in competition. He reached a career high ranking of world number 28 in March 2025.

== Bowls career ==
=== Outdoors ===
Greenslade took up bowling at the age of eight after his parents (both Welsh internationals) introduced him to the sport.

In 2001, he won the Hong Kong International Bowls Classic singles title.

He has competed three Commonwealth Games in the 2002 Commonwealth Games at Heaton Park, Manchester (where he won a bronze in the fours, in the 2006 Commonwealth Games at the John Cain Memorial Park in Thornbury, Victoria, Australia and in the 2010 Commonwealth Games at the Yamuna Sports Complex in Delhi. His outdoor club is Dinas Powys. In 2009 he won the pairs gold medal and singles bronze medal at the Atlantic Bowls Championships.

He was the Welsh National singles champion in 2011 as 2014 and won the singles at the British Isles Bowls Championships in 2015.

=== Indoors ===
Greenslade finished runner-up to Andy Thomson in the 2012 World Indoor Bowls Championship and runner-up twice in the Pairs in the 2003 World Indoor Bowls Championship and 2007 World Indoor Bowls Championship with partner Robert Weale. He also won a bronze medal at the 2004 World Outdoor Bowls Championship in the pairs again with Robert Weale.

Individual success includes the 2004 Scottish Masters and 2006 Welsh International Open but his greatest achievement indoors was winning the Open pairs with bowls partner Les Gillett at the 2017 World Indoor Bowls Championship in Great Yarmouth. His indoor club is Sully.

After switching to represent Guernsey he won the singles title at the 2024 World Bowls Indoor Championships, held at the Guernsey Indoor Bowling Association.
