= 2006–07 World Bowls Tour =

The 2006–07 World Bowls Tour is a multi competition tournament over a season in bowls. The season started on 29 October 2006 and lasted until 9 February 2007. The World Bowls Tour is organised by the Professional Bowls Association, the World Bowls Ltd and the World Indoor Bowls Council. It is made up of four ranking event tournaments, The tournaments are:

- The engage International Open 2006, at Ponds Forge, Sheffield
- The Great British Mobility Group Scottish International Open 2006, at Dewars Centre, Perth
- Potters Holidays World Indoor Bowls Championships 2007, at Potters Holiday Resort, Hopton, Norfolk
- Welsh International Open 2007 at Selwyn Samuel Centre, Llanelli

== Players ==
The top 16 players automatically entered into the four main tournaments. The rest of the players are made up of qualifiers. The top 16 for the 2006–07 season were:

1. (England) Greg Harlow
2. (Wales) Jason Greenslade
3. (Scotland) David Gourlay
4. (England) Andy Thomson
5. (Scotland) Paul Foster
6. (Scotland) Alex Marshall
7. (England) Ian Bond
8. (Wales) Robert Weale
9. (Australia) Kelvin Kerkow
10. (England) Mark Royal
11. (Wales) John Price
12. (Northern Ireland) Jonathan Ross
13. (Australia) Mark McMahon
14. (England) Bill Jackson
15. (England) Mervyn King
16. (England) Les Gillett

== Calendar ==
Date	Place	Event	Winner	Second	Semi finalists	Quarter finalists
29 October– 5 November 2006	Sheffield, England	Int'l Open 2006	(England) Greg Harlow	(Australia) David Gourlay	(Scotland) Paul Foster (Australia) Mark McMahon	(England) Mark Royal (Wales) Richard Morgan (Northern Ireland) Jonathan Ross (England) Mervyn King
25 November– 2 December 2006	Perth, Scotland	Scottish Int'l Open 2006	(Australia) Kelvin Kerkow	(Australia) David Gourlay	(England) Greg Harlow (Wales) Robert Weale	(England) Chris Young (Scotland) Alex Marshall (Scotland) Paul Foster (England) Mark Royal
8 January– 14 January 2007	Norfolk, England	World Indoor Pairs 2007	(Australia) David Gourlay & (England) Billy Jackson	(Wales) Robert Weale & (Wales) Jason Greenslade	(England) Andy Thomson & (England) Ian Bond (Scotland) Wayne Hogg & (Scotland) Neil Speirs	(Wales) Stephen Rees & (Wales) John Price (England) Danny Brown & (England) James Heath (England) Mervyn King & (Australia) Kelvin Kerkow (Northern Ireland) Jonathan Ross & (England) Greg Harlow
8 January– 28 January 2007	Norfolk, England	World Indoor Singles 2007	(Scotland) Alex Marshall	(England) Mervyn King	(Scotland) David Gourlay (Wales) Jason Greenslade	(Wales) Robert Weale (England) Andy Thomson (England) Jamie Chestney (England) Billy Jackson
19 January– 21 January 2007	Norfolk, England	Mixed Pairs World Matchplay 2007	(England) Jo Morris & (England) Greg Harlow	(New Zealand) Noreen Stratford & (England) Ian Bond	(Guernsey) Alison Merrien & (Scotland) Alex Marshall (Scotland) Caroline Brown & (Wales) Jason Greenslade	(England) Carol Ashby & (Wales) John Price (United States) Rosa Gandara & (Australia) David Gourlay (England) Ellen Falkner & (Scotland) Paul Foster (Canada) Laila Hassan & (England) Andy Thomson
19 January– 24 January 2007	Norfolk, England	Ladies World Matchplay 2007	(Scotland) Caroline Brown	(England) Ellen Falkner	(England) Debbie Stavrou (England) Carol Ashby	(Scotland) Karen Dawson (New Zealand) Noreen Statford (United States) Rosa Gandara (England) Jo Morris
3 February– 9 February 2007	Llanelli, Wales	Welsh Int'l Open 2007	(Scotland) Paul Foster	(Wales) Robert Weale	(Northern Ireland) Jonathan Ross (Australia) David Gourlay	(Wales) Jason Greenslade (Scotland) Alex Marshall (England) Ian Bond (England) Ian Meyer

== See also ==
- 2007-08 World Bowls Tour
- 2007 in bowls
