= 2007 World Indoor Bowls Championship =

Bowls championship held in Great Yarmouth, Norfolk

World Indoor Championships 2007
- 29th World Indoor Bowls Championships
- Location: (England) Great Yarmouth, Norfolk
- Date: 08-28 January 2007.
- Category: World Indoor Championships

The 2007 World Indoor Bowls Championships was held at Potters Leisure Resort, Hopton on Sea, Great Yarmouth, England, from 08-28 January 2007. The event was sponsored by Potters Holidays.
Alex Marshall won the men's singles defeating Mervyn King in the final achieving a record fourth title. Marshall won the title despite carrying a back injury and being seeded only seventh.

== Winners ==
Event	Winner
Men's Singles	(Scotland) Alex Marshall
Women's Singles	(Scotland) Caroline Brown
Men's Pairs	(England) Billy Jackson & (Australia) David Gourlay
Mixed Pairs	(England) Greg Harlow & (England) Jo Morris

== Draws and results ==
=== Men's singles ===
First round
1	(England) Mervyn King	9	6
(England) Mark Smith	2	6
16	(England) Les Gillett	7	9
(Canada) Hiren Bhartu	2	7
8	(England) Ian Bond	8	9
(Scotland) Steven Morgan	6	5
9	(Wales) Robert Weale	5	8	2
(New Zealand) Rowan Brassey	8	2	1
4	(Australia) David Gourlay	9	12
(South Africa) Theuns Fraser	8	2
13	(Northern Ireland) Jonathan Ross	10	7
(United States) Richard Broad	3	5
5	(England) Andy Thomson	11	7
(England) Paul Coleman	3	4
12	(Wales) John Price	9	6	0
(England) Danny Brown	4	7	2
3	(Wales) Jason Greenslade	9	8
(England) Graham Smith	7	8
14	(Australia) Mark McMahon	9	9
(Northern Ireland) Stephen Moran	3	3
6	(Scotland) Paul Foster	7	8
(England) Richard Moses	7	5
11	(England) Mark Royal	2	7
(England) Jamie Chestney	7	7
2	(England) Greg Harlow	6	9
(England) Chris Young	5	7
15	(England) Billy Jackson	11	4	2
(Australia) Ricky Lindbeck	2	7	0
7	(Scotland) Alex Marshall	12	12
(Hong Kong) Heron Lau	2	0
10	(Australia) Kelvin Kerkow	7	10
(Scotland) Charles Millar	7	6

Second round
1	(England) King	11	8	2
16	(England) Gillett	5	10	1
8	(England) Bond	8	2	1
9	(Wales) Weale	3	11	2
4	(Australia) Gourlay	14	4	2
13	(Northern Ireland) Ross	6	6	0
5	(England) Thomson	6	8
(England) Brown	5	5
3	(Wales) Greenslade	8	11
14	(Australia) McMahon	3	6
6	(Scotland) Foster	5	5
(England) Chestney	7	9
2	(England) Harlow	6	5
15	(England) Jackson	7	6
7	(Scotland) Marshall	9	8
10	(Australia) Kerkow	7	5

Quarter-finals
1	(England) King	7	10
9	(Wales) Weale	5	6
4	(Australia) Gourlay	6	12	2
5	(England) Thomson	7	2	1
3	(Wales) Greenslade	9	9
(England) Chestney	9	6
15	(England) Jackson	4	6
7	(Scotland) Marshall	8	7

Semi-finals
1	(England) King	11	10
4	(Australia) Gourlay	1	4
3	(Wales) Greenslade	6	5
7	(Scotland) Marshall	7	7

Final
1	(England) King	7	4	0
7	(Scotland) Marshall	6	13	2

=== Men's Pairs ===
First round

Quarter-finals

Semi-finals

Final

1
(Australia) David Gourlay

(England) Billy Jackson

9
8

(Wales) John Roberts

(Wales) Martin Selway

4
4

1
(Australia) Gourlay

(England) Jackson

11
4
2

8
(Wales) John Price

(Wales) Stephen Rees

8
6

8
(Wales) Price

(Wales) Rees

0
8
1

(New Zealand) Paul Girdler

(New Zealand) Ken Walker

8
5

1
(Australia) Gourlay

(England) Jackson

7
4
2

4
(England) Ian Bond

(England) Andy Thomson

9
5
2

4
(England) Bond

(England) Thomson

5
9
0

(Australia) Anthony Laguzza

(Australia) Aron Sherriff

7
10
0

4
(England) Bond

(England) Thomson

8
6

5
(Scotland) Alex Marshall

(Scotland) Paul Foster

6
11
1

(England) Brown

(England) Heath

6
5

(England) Danny Brown

(England) James Heath

7
2
2

1
(Australia) Gourlay

(England) Jackson

14
9

2
(England) Greg Harlow

(Northern Ireland) Jonathan Ross

9
11

3
(Wales) Greenslade

(Wales) Weale

3
6

(Canada) Kevin Jones

(Canada) Martin Haalstra

4
3

2
(England) Harlow

(Northern Ireland) Ross

5
5

7
(England) Mark Royal

(England) Simon Skelton

8
6

(Scotland) Hogg

(Scotland) Speirs

6
5

(Scotland) Wayne Hogg

(Scotland) Neil Speirs

10
8

(Scotland) Hogg

(Scotland) Speirs

3
4

3
(Wales) Jason Greenslade

(Wales) Robert Weale

12
10

3
(Wales) Greenslade

(Wales) Weale

11
9

(South Africa) Theuns Fraser

(South Africa) Nick Rusling

0
4

3
(Wales) Greenslade

(Wales) Weale

7
9

6
(Australia) Kelvin Kerkow

(England) Mervyn King

9
9

6
(Australia) Kerkow

(England) King

6
3

(Northern Ireland) Noel Graham

(Northern Ireland) Clifford Craig

8
9

=== Women's singles ===
First round
(Scotland) Caroline Brown
bye
(United States) Rosa Gandara	11	8
(Hong Kong) Candy Leung	3	3
(England) Carol Ashby	9	12
(Canada) Leila Hassan	2	3
(England) Jo Morris
bye
(England) Ellen Falkner
bye
(Scotland) Karen Dawson	11	12
(South Africa) Tracy Meyeridricks	3	0
(England) Debbie Stavrou	7	9
(Guernsey) Alison Merrien	6	7
(New Zealand) Noreen Stratford
bye

Second round
(Scotland) Brown	13	10
(United States) Gandara	4	12
(England) Ashby	7	8
(England) Morris	6	7
(England) Falkner	13	9
(Scotland) Dawson	8	4
(England) Stavrou	10	7	2
(New Zealand) Stratford	5	8	1

Quarter-finals
(Scotland) Brown	7	9
(England) Ashby	6	8
(England) Falkner	7	9	2
(England) Stavrou	10	8	1

Semi-finals
(Scotland) Brown	9	10
(England) Falkner	4	5

=== Mixed Pairs ===
Quarter-finals
(Australia) David Gourlay & (United States) Rosa Gandara	5	5
(England) Ian Bond & (New Zealand) Noreen Stratford	7	8
(Scotland) Alex Marshall & (Guernsey) Alison Merrien	12	7
(Wales) John Price & (England) Carol Ashby	2	3
(Wales) Jason Greenslade & (Scotland) Caroline Brown	9	7
(Scotland) Paul Foster & (England) Ellen Falkner	6	5
(England) Andy Thomson & (Canada) Laila Hassan	3	5
(England) Greg Harlow & (England) Jo Morris	8	7

Semi-finals
(England) Bond & (New Zealand) Stratford	7	11
(Scotland) Marshall & (Guernsey) Merrien	7	4
(Wales) Greenslade & (Scotland) Brown	4	5
(England) Harlow & (England) Morris	11	9

Final
(England) Bond & (New Zealand) Stratford	4	2
(England) Harlow & (England) Morris	9	13

== See also ==
- 2007 in bowls
