= 2001 World Indoor Bowls Championship =

Bowls championship held in Great Yarmouth (men), Belfast (women)

World Indoor Championships 2001
- 23rd World Indoor Bowls Championships
- Location: (England) Great Yarmouth (men) (Northern Ireland) Belfast (women)
- Date(s): 8–27 January 2001 (men); 28–30 March 2001 (women)
- Category: World Indoor Championships

The 2001 Potters Holidays World World Indoor Bowls Championship was held at Potters Leisure Resort, Hopton on Sea, Great Yarmouth, England, from 8–21 January 2001, with the pairs following on from the 23–27 January 2001.

In the singles Paul Foster won his second title beating Richard Corsie in the final.

In the pairs Les Gillett and Mark McMahon defeated Hugh Duff & Paul Foster in the final.

The women's singles competition took place in Belfast from March 28–30. The title was won by Betty Brown.

== Winners ==
Event	Winner
Men's Singles	(Scotland) Paul Foster
Women's Singles	(Scotland) Betty Brown
Men's Pairs	(England) Les Gillett & (England) Mark McMahon

== Draw and results ==
=== Men's singles ===
==== First round ====
Player 1	Player 2	Score
(Wales) Jason Greenslade	(Scotland) D Wilson	7-4 2-7 7-2 0-7 7-2
(Australia) Ian Taylor	(South Africa) Bruce Makkink	4-7 7-3 7-4 7-0
(England) Ian Bond	(New Zealand) Kerry Chapman	7-0 7-3 7-2
(England) Chris Young	(Wales) Les Saunders	7-4 7-2 7-4
(Northern Ireland) Neil Booth	(Jersey) Lee Nixon	7-3 7-2 2-1
(England) Gary Smith	(England) Simon Lilley	7-3 3-7 3-7 7-5 7-4
(England) Billy Jackson	(New Zealand) Stephen Posa	7-0 7-5 4-7 7-5
(Australia) Kevin Walsh	(Wales) Phil Rowlands	7-0 1-7 7-4 7-5
(England) David Holt	(United States) Frank Souza	7-5 7-5 7-4
(South Africa) Gerry Baker	(Australia) Steve Glasson	5-7 7-3 7-6 5-7 7-5
(Northern Ireland) Jeremy Henry	(Scotland) Graeme Archer	7-6 7-5 5-7 2-7 7-6
(England) Robert Newman	(Hong Kong) Danny Ho	7-4 7-2 7-2
(Northern Ireland) Jonathan Ross	(Northern Ireland) Michael Nutt	7-3 5-7 1-7 7-1 7-4
(New Zealand) Rowan Brassey	(Canada) Christie Grahame	7-3 6-7 7-0 7-1
(England) Greg Moon	(England) Greg Harlow	5-7 7-4 3-7 7-2 7-1
(Australia) Rex Johnston	(Australia) Steve Glasson	7-2 1-7 3-7 7-1 7-0

Second round
1	(Wales) Robert Weale	7	1	7	7
(Northern Ireland) Jeremy Henry	5	7	3	2
16	(Scotland) Graham Robertson	2	6	4
(Australia) Kevin Walsh	7	7	7
8	(Scotland) Hugh Duff	7	7	7
(England) Greg Moon	6	3	2
9	(Scotland) Paul Foster	3
(Australia) Rex Johnston	1
4	(Wales) Stephen Rees	3	3	4
(Northern Ireland) Jonathan Ross	7	7	7
13	(England) Wynne Richards	6	0	6
(Northern Ireland) Neil Booth	7	7	7
5	(Scotland) Alex Marshall	7	7	7
(Australia) Ian Taylor	3	4	3
12	(Hong Kong) Noel Kennedy	3	5	3
(England) Billy Jackson	7	7	7
3	(Wales) John Price	7	5	7	7
(South Africa) Gerry Baker	2	7	4	5
14	(Scotland) Richard Corsie	6	1	7	7	7
(England) Robert Newman	7	7	6	0	?
6	(England) Les Gillett	3	7	7	7
(Wales) Jason Greenslade	7	6	6	3
11	(England) Mark McMahon	7	7	2	7
(England) Chris Young	5	4	7	3
2	(Scotland) David Gourlay	7	6	7	3	7
(New Zealand) Rowan Brassey	2	7	4	7	6
15	(England) Tony Allcock	7	1	4	7	7
(England) Ian Bond	4	7	7	5	6
7	(England) Andy Thomson	5	4	5
(England) David Holt	7	7	7
10	(England) Mervyn King	7	7	7
(England) Gary Smith	3	3	6

Third round
1	(Wales) Weale	7	7	7
(Australia) Walsh	4	2	4
8	(Scotland) Duff	7	7	4	2	3
9	(Scotland) Foster	3	2	7	7	7
(Northern Ireland) Ross	4	7	4	2
(Northern Ireland) Booth	7	2	7	7
5	(Scotland) Marshall	7	7	5	7
12	(England) Jackson	3	5	7	4
3	(Wales) Price	6	7	3	4
14	(Scotland) Corsie	7	5	7	7
6	(England) Gillett	7	4	7	7
11	(England) McMahon	5	7	4	4
2	(Scotland) Gourlay	7	3	7	7
15	(England) Allcock	3	7	3	4
(England) Holt	7	7	4	7
10	(England) King	3	2	7	2

Quarter-finals
1	(Wales) Weale	5	6	6
9	(Scotland) Foster	7	7	7
(Northern Ireland) Booth	5	3	2
5	(Scotland) Marshall	7	7	7
14	(Scotland) Corsie	7	7	7
6	(England) Gillett	4	6	2
2	(Scotland) Gourlay	6	7	7	7
(England) Holt	7	3	1	0

Semi-finals
9	(Scotland) Foster	7	1	7	7
5	(Scotland) Marshall	6	7	5	5
Final
9	(Scotland) Foster	1	7	7	7
14	(Scotland) Corsie	7	3	2	4
14	(Scotland) Corsie	7	7	7
2	(Scotland) Gourlay	2	3	4

=== Men's Pairs ===
First round

Quarter-finals

Semi-finals

Final

1
(Scotland) David Gourlay

(Scotland) Alex Marshall

6
3
3

(England) David Holt

(England) Tony Allcock

7
7
7

(England) Holt

(England) Allcock

0
7
7
7

8
(England) Greg Harlow

(England) Mervyn King

4
7
7
7

8
(England) Harlow

(England) King

7
6
2
5

(England) Mark Bantock

(England) Robert Newman

7
3
4
3

(England) Holt

(England) Allcock

4
6
4

4
(Scotland) Richard Corsie

(Scotland) Graham Robertson

1
7
5
1

5
(Scotland) Duff

(Scotland) Foster

7
7
7

(Northern Ireland) Jonathan Ross

(England) Ian Bond

7
5
7
7

(Northern Ireland) Ross

(England) Bond

5
6
7
3

5
(Scotland) Hugh Duff

(Scotland) Paul Foster

2
7
5
7
7

5
(Scotland) Duff

(Scotland) Foster

7
7
5
7

(Northern Ireland) Robert Corry

(Northern Ireland) Roy Battersby

7
5
7
5
4

5
(Scotland) Duff

(Scotland) Foster

7
4
3
7
3

2
(England) Gary Smith

(England) Andy Thomson

7
2
6
3

7
(England) Gillett

(England) McMahon

6
7
7
3
7

(Wales) Jeff Webley

(Wales) Nigel Leigh

6
7
7
7

(Wales) Webley

(Wales) Leigh

7
6
1
2

7
(England) Les Gillett

(England) Mark McMahon

7
7
7

7
(England) Gillett

(England) McMahon

3
7
7
7

(England) Billy Jackson

(England) Wynne Richards

5
4
5

7
(England) Gillett

(England) McMahon

2
5
7
7
7

3
(Wales) John Price

(Wales) Stephen Rees

7
4
7
7

6
(Wales) Greenslade

(Wales) Weale

7
7
3
6
2

(New Zealand) Rowan Brassey

(Hong Kong) Noel Kennedy

4
7
0
2

3
(Wales) Price

(Wales) Rees

7
0
7
6
3

6
(Wales) Jason Greenslade

(Wales) Robert Weale

7
7
7

6
(Wales) Greenslade

(Wales) Weale

3
7
5
7
7

(Scotland) Joey Strickland

(Scotland) George Sneddon

5
3
0

=== Women's singles ===
First round
(Scotland) Betty Brown	5	7	7
(England) Edna Bessell	7	1	4
(New Zealand) Marlene Castle	7	7
(England) Cheryl Northall	2	3
(Australia) Marilyn Peddell	7	7
(Jersey) Gaynor Thomas	5	5
(Israel) Tami Kamzel	7	7
(Canada) Lynn McElroy	3	5

Semi-finals
(Scotland) Brown	4	7	7
(New Zealand) Castle	7	4	0
(Australia) Peddell	7	7
(Israel) Kamzel	2	0

Final
(Scotland) Brown	7	1	7	7
(Australia) Peddell	1	7	4	6
