= 2010 World Indoor Bowls Championship =

Bowls championship held in Great Yarmouth, Norfolk

World Indoor Championships 2010
- 32nd World Indoor Bowls Championships
- Location: (England) Great Yarmouth, Norfolk
- Date: 05-24 January 2010.
- Category: World Indoor Championships

The 2010 World Indoor Bowls Championships was held at Potters Leisure Resort, Hopton on Sea, Great Yarmouth, England, from 05 to 24 January 2010.

== Winners ==
Event	Winner
Men's Singles	(England) Greg Harlow
Women's Singles	(England) Debbie Stavrou
Men's Pairs	(England) Andy Thomson & (England) Ian Bond
Mixed Pairs	(Scotland) Alex Marshall & (England) Carol Ashby

== Draw and results ==
=== Men's singles ===
==== Finals ====
Semi-finals
x	(England) Paxton	8	4
5	(England) Harlow	9	8
x	(Scotland) Anderson	8	11
x	(England) Brett	2	8

Final
5	(England) Harlow	9	10
x	(Scotland) Anderson	8	3

==== Top half ====
First round
1	(England) Billy Jackson	7	8	1
(Canada) Hirendra Bhartu	7	8	2
16	(Northern Ireland) Jonathan Ross	8	7	2
(Scotland) Willie Wood	4	8	1
8	(England) Andy Thomson	6	5
(England) Robert Paxton	7	6
9	(England) Mervyn King	5	6
(Australia) Steve Glasson	6	6
4	(Scotland) Paul Foster	2	6	2
(Wales) Richard Morgan	8	4	1
13	(England) Les Gillett	2	3
(Scotland) Darren Burnett	11	8
5	(England) Greg Harlow	7	8
(Wales) Phillip Rowlands	2	7
12	(England) Ian Bond	5	4
(Australia) Ben Twist	7	8

Second round
(Canada) Bhartu	5	3
16	(Northern Ireland) Ross	9	8
(England) Paxton	9	5	2
(Australia) Glasson	2	7	1
4	(Scotland) Foster	7	9
(Scotland) Burnett	7	8
5	(England) Harlow	10	9
(Australia) Twist	5	7

Quarter-finals
16	(Northern Ireland) Ross	5	8
(England) Paxton	8	9
4	(Scotland) Foster	6	3
5	(England) Harlow	6	8

Semi-finals
(England) Paxton	8	4
5	(England) Harlow	9	8

==== Bottom half ====
First round
2	(Scotland) Alex Marshall	10	7
(England) Tim Stone	6	3
15	(Australia) Mark McMahon	6	5
(Scotland) Stewart Anderson	8	11
7	(Wales) Jason Greenslade	11	6
(Australia) Brett Wilkie	6	6
10	(Wales) Robert Weale	8	8	1
(Wales) John Price	13	3	2
3	(England) Mark Royal	7	5	0
(Wales) Jarrad Breen	2	7	2
14	(England) Simon Skelton	3	6
(England) Nick Brett	8	7
6	(Scotland) David Gourlay	10	9
(Scotland) Gary Hutchison	6	1
11	(Australia) Kelvin Kerkow	13	10
(Hong Kong) Stephen Chan	6	2

Second round
2	(Scotland) Marshall	10	4	1
(Scotland) Anderson	4	9	2
7	(Wales) Greenslade	7	6
(Wales) Price	9	9
(Wales) Breen	5	3
(England) Brett	5	8
6	(Scotland) Gourlay	7	7
11	(Australia) Kerkow	3	7

Quarter-finals
(Scotland) Anderson	13	8
(Wales) Price	0	6
(England) Brett	12	5	2
6	(Scotland) Gourlay	6	6	0

Semi-finals
(Scotland) Anderson	8	11
(England) Brett	2	8

=== Men's Pairs ===
First round

Quarter-finals

Semi-finals

Final

1
(Australia) Kelvin Kerkow

(England) Mervyn King

11
8

(Scotland) Andrew Barker

(Scotland) Michael Stepney

6
7

1
(Australia) Kerkow

(England) King

5
8

8
(England) Les Gillett

(Wales) Richard Morgan

10
11

8
(England) Gillett

(Wales) Morgan

5
6

(New Zealand) Phil Bennett

(New Zealand) Geoff Wilson

1
3

1
(Australia) Kerkow

(England) King

3
6

4
(England) Nick Brett

(England) Greg Harlow

4
6

5
(Australia) Gourlay

(England) Jackson

9
9

(Australia) Brett Wilkie

(Australia) Mark Casey

6
8

(Australia) Wilkie

(Australia) Casey

3
3

5
(Australia) David Gourlay

(England) Billy Jackson

8
8

5
(Australia) Gourlay

(England) Jackson

11
10

(Wales) John Price

(Wales) David Axon

3
6

5
(Australia) Gourlay

(England) Jackson

9
5
1

2
(Scotland) Alex Marshall

(Scotland) Paul Foster

10
7

7
(England) Thomson

(England) Bond

4
8
2

(Canada) Hirendra Bhartu

(Canada) Fred Fong

3
4

2
(Scotland) Marshall

(Scotland) Foster

5
5

7
(England) Ian Bond

(England) Andy Thomson

11
7

7
(England) Bond

(England) Thomson

6
7

(South Africa) Craig Rimmington

(South Africa) Rino Lozzi

3
5

7
(England) Bond

(England) Thomson

7
4
2

3
(England) Mark Royal

(England) Simon Skelton

4
11
2

3
(England) Royal

(England) Skelton

5
7
1

(Northern Ireland) Gary McCloy

(Northern Ireland) Ian McClure

9
3
0

3
(England) Royal

(England) Skelton

10
6
2

6
(Wales) Jason Greenslade

(Wales) Robert Weale

5
6

(England) Chestney

(England) Smith

2
8
0

(England) Jamie Chestney

(England) Graham Smith

10
9

=== Women's singles ===
First round
(England) Debbie Stavrou
bye
(England) Ellen Falkner	7	4
(Israel) Ruthie Gilor	9	8
(England) Stephanie Crates	6	6
(United States) Dee McSparran	9	6
(England) Sarah Seymour
bye
(Guernsey) Alison Merrien
bye
(England) Janice Gower	14	8
(United States) Mary Ann Beath	5	4
(England) Carol Ashby
bye
(Wales) Kerry Packwood	9	8
(Scotland) Melanie Cruickshank	8	8

Second round
(England) Stavrou	8	9
(Israel) Gilor	2	3
(United States) McSparran	11	4	2
(England) Seymour	7	8	1
(Guernsey) Merrien	13	7
(England) Gower	6	6
(England) Ashby	1	5
(Wales) Packwood	10	10

Quarter-finals
(England) Stavrou	10	11
(United States) McSparran	4	5
(Guernsey) Merrien	11	10
(Wales) Packwood	6	3

Semi-finals
(England) Stavrou	9	5	2
(Guernsey) Merrien	7	9	0

=== Mixed Pairs ===
Quarter-finals
(Scotland) David Gourlay & (Australia) Ceri Ann Davies	10	3	2
(England) Andy Thomson & (Israel) Ruthie Gilor	2	9	0
(Wales) Jason Greenslade & (Wales) Kerry Packwood	7	2	0
(Scotland) Paul Foster & (England) Debbie Stavrou	12	10	2
(England) Mark Royal & (United States) Dee McSparran	9	9
(England) Mervyn King & (Guernsey) Alison Merrien	8	8
(Scotland) Alex Marshall & (England) Carol Ashby	3	10	2
(England) Greg Harlow & (England) Sarah Seymour	11	4	0

Semi-finals
(Scotland) Gourlay & (Australia) Davies	5	9	2
(Scotland) Foster & (England) Stavrou	7	4	1
(England) Royal & (United States) McSparran	1	6
(Scotland) Marshall & (England) Ashby	11	8

Final
(Scotland) Gourlay & (Australia) Davies	9	5	0
(Scotland) Marshall & (England) Ashby	6	10	2
