= 2006 World Indoor Bowls Championship =

Bowls championship held in Great Yarmouth, Norfolk

World Indoor Championships 2006
- 28th World Indoor Bowls Championships
- Location: (England) Great Yarmouth, Norfolk
- Date(s): January, 2006.
- Category: World Indoor Championships

The 2006 Potters Holidays World Indoor Bowls Championship was held at Potters Leisure Resort, Hopton on Sea, Great Yarmouth, England, in 2006. The event was sponsored by Potters Holidays.

== Winners ==
Event	Winner
Men's Singles	(England) Mervyn King
Women's Singles	(England) Ellen Falkner
Men's Pairs	(England) Billy Jackson & (Australia) David Gourlay
Mixed Pairs	(Wales) John Price & (England) Carol Ashby

=== Men's singles ===
==== Finals ====
Semi-finals
(England) Paxton	3	10	1
(England) King	11	7	2
(New Zealand) Hill	6	2
14	(England) Harlow	10	8

Final
(England) King	12	13
14	(England) Harlow	8	9

==== Top half ====
First round
1	(Scotland) Paul Foster	7	10
(England) Gordon Charlton	6	2
16	(Hong Kong) Noel Kennedy	10	7
(Canada) Kevin Jones	9	6
8	(Wales) Jason Greenslade	8	4
(England) Robert Paxton	10	6
9	(Australia) Mark McMahon	7	8
(England) George Tubby	5	6
4	(Scotland) Alex Marshall	9	8
(Scotland) Graham Robertson	8	3
13	(England) Billy Jackson	8	4
(England) Mervyn King	9	8
5	(Australia) Kelvin Kerkow	4	8
(Wales) Stephen Rees	8	9
12	(England) Les Gillett	5	6
(England) Danny Denison	6	6

Second round
1	(Scotland) Foster	12	9
16	(Hong Kong) Kennedy	2	7
(England) Paxton	11	2	2
9	(Australia) McMahon	3	7	0
4	(Scotland) Marshall	1	1
(England) King	11	9
(Wales) Rees	6	8
(England) Denison	5	7

Quarter-finals
1	(Scotland) Foster	9	4	0
(England) Paxton	4	8	2
(England) King	7	9
(Wales) Rees	7	3

Semi-finals
(England) Paxton	3	10	1
(England) King	11	7	2

==== Bottom half ====
First round
2	(England) Andy Thomson	5	7
(New Zealand) Jamie Hill	8	11
15	(England) Mark Royal	5	10	2
(Scotland) Wayne Hogg	10	4	0
7	(Wales) John Price	8	1	1
(Republic of Ireland) Barry Browne	7	10	2
10	(England) Ian Bond	8	3	0
(Wales) Richard Morgan	5	9	2
3	(Australia) David Gourlay	6	5	2
(England) Stuart Airey	4	8	1
14	(England) Greg Harlow	7	7
(England) Robert Newman	6	5
6	(Wales) Robert Weale	12	6	1
(England) Graham Smith	5	7	2
11	(Northern Ireland) Jonathan Ross	10	8
(Australia) Ian Rocky Stone	1	3

Second round
(New Zealand) Hill	10	12
15	(England) Royal	1	6
(Republic of Ireland) Browne	4	6
(Wales) Morgan	9	6
3	(Australia) Gourlay	8	7
14	(England) Harlow	8	10
(England) Smith	3	10	2
11	(Northern Ireland) Ross	11	4	1

Quarter-finals
(New Zealand) Hill	11	8
(Wales) Morgan	6	8
14	(England) Harlow	12	6	2
(England) Smith	4	7	1

Semi-finals
(New Zealand) Hill	6	2
14	(England) Harlow	10	8

=== Women's singles ===
First round
(Canada) Laura Hawryszko	5	3
(South Africa) Judy Penfold	6	11
(England) Ellen Falkner
bye
(New Zealand) Rozanna Muriwai	9	8	2
(United States) Rosa Gandara	9	8	0
(Scotland) Caroline Brown
bye
(England) Jo Morris
bye
(England) Theresa Darnell-Langton	11	10
(England) Amy Monkhouse	4	7
(England) Gemma Broadhurst	10	8
(England) Sarah McKay	1	6
(England) Carol Ashby
bye

Quarter-final
(South Africa) Penfold	1	3
(England) Falkner	11	10
(New Zealand) Muriwai	3	6
(Scotland) Brown	10	10
(England) Morris	7	10
(England) Darnell-Langton	6	16
(England) Broadhurst	10	10
(England) Ashby	10	8

Semi-final
(England) Falkner	6	9
(Scotland) Brown	6	8
(England) Morris	10	7
(England) Broadhurst	7	3

Final
(England) Falkner	11	11
(England) Morris	2	5

=== Men's Pairs ===
First round
1	(Australia) Kelvin Kerkow & (England) Mervyn King	12	9
(South Africa) Donny Piketh & (South Africa) John Connellan	1	5
8	(England) Les Gillett & (England) Simon Skelton	5	8	2
(England) Chris Young & (England) Paul Coleman	6	4	0
4	(Scotland) Alex Marshall & (Scotland) Paul Foster	10	7	2
(Northern Ireland) Ian McClure & (Northern Ireland) Jeremy Henry	6	10	0
5	(Wales) Jason Greenslade & (Wales) Robert Weale	6	11
(Wales) Leslie Saunders & (Wales) Steve Harris	5	3
3	(Australia) David Gourlay & (England) Billy Jackson	7	7
(United States) Ed Quo & (United States) Neil Furman	6	5
6	(Wales) John Price & (Wales) Stephen Rees	12	11
(New Zealand) Robbie Thomson & (New Zealand) Andrew McCallum	4	3
7	(England) Greg Harlow & (Northern Ireland) Jonathan Ross	5	8	2
(Australia) Anthony Laguzza & (Australia) Aron Sherriff	6	4	0
2	(England) Ian Bond & (England) Andy Thomson	8	9
(Scotland) Paul O'Donnell & (Scotland) John McCrorie	4	1

Quarter-finals
1	(England) King & (Australia) Kerkow	5	7	2
8	(England) Gillett & (England) Skelton	6	3	1
4	(Scotland) Marshall & (Scotland) Foster	8	9
5	(Wales) Greenslade & (Wales) Weale	8	7
3	(Australia) Gourlay & (England) Jackson	8	7
6	(Wales) Rees & (Wales) Price	6	5
7	(England) Harlow & (Northern Ireland) Ross	7	12	2
2	(England) Bond & (England) Thomson	9	0	0

Semi-finals
1	(England) King & (Australia) Kerkow	9	10
4	(Scotland) Marshall & (Scotland) Foster	4	6
3	(Australia) Gourlay & (England) Jackson	10	7
7	(Northern Ireland) Ross & (England) Harlow	8	3

Final
1	(England) King & (Australia) Kerkow	6	12	0
3	(Australia) Gourlay & (England) Jackson	9	3	2

=== Mixed Pairs ===
Quarter-finals
(Wales) John Price & (England) Carol Ashby	12	9
(Australia) Kelvin Kerkow & (England) Jo Morris	1	4
(Scotland) Paul Foster & (United States) Rosa Gandara	9	6
(Scotland) Alex Marshall & (Canada) Laura Hawryszko	7	4
(Wales) Robert Weale & (England) Amy Monkhouse	7	8
(Wales) Jason Greenslade & (Scotland) Caroline Brown	7	5
(Scotland) David Gourlay & (England) Ellen Falkner	8	10
(England) Andy Thomson & (New Zealand) Rozanna Muriwai	8	1

Semi-finals
(Wales) Price & (England) Ashby	9	7	2
(Scotland) Foster & (United States) Gandara	2	8	0
(Wales) Weale & (England) Monkhouse	9	6	2
(Australia) Gourlay & (England) Falkner	5	8	1

Final
(Wales) Price & (England) Ashby	13	8
(Wales) Weale & (England) Monkhouse	3	8
