= 2004 World Indoor Bowls Championship =

Bowls championship held in Great Yarmouth, Norfolk

World Indoor Championships 2004
- 26th World Indoor Bowls Championships
- Location: (England) Great Yarmouth, Norfolk
- Date: 05-25 January 2004.
- Category: World Indoor Championships

The 2004 Potters Holidays World Indoor Bowls Championship was held at Potters Leisure Resort, Hopton on Sea, Great Yarmouth, England, from 05-25 January 2004.
An inaugural event was introduced for mixed pairs.

== Winners ==
Event	Winner
Men's Singles	(Scotland) Alex Marshall
Women's Singles	(England) Carol Ashby
Men's Pairs	(Northern Ireland) Ian McClure & Jeremy Henry
Mixed Pairs	(Scotland) Alex Marshall & (England) Amy Monkhouse

== Draw and results ==
=== Men's singles ===
==== Finals ====
Semi-finals
1	(Scotland) Marshall	10	4	2
5	(Wales) Weale	5	7	0
7	(Australia) McMahon	9	7	2
(England) Smith	4	12	1

Final
1	(Scotland) Marshall	13	9
7	(Australia) McMahon	3	8

==== Top half ====
First round
1	(Scotland) Alex Marshall	4	7
(England) Danny Denison	3	6
16	(England) Billy Jackson	11	5	0
(Wales) Richard Morgan	3	9	2
8	(England) Andy Thomson	4	10	0
(Scotland) Neil Speirs	9	7	2
9	(Wales) Jason Greenslade	6	11	2
(Republic of Ireland) Mark McPeak	7	3	0
4	(Wales) John Price	1	4
(Australia) Steve Glasson	10	8
13	(Northern Ireland) Jonathan Ross	7	10
(England) Brett Arkley	2	2
5	(Wales) Robert Weale	11	10
(Scotland) Hugh Duff	2	1
12	(England) Les Gillett	3	8	1
(Northern Ireland) Neil Booth	6	7	2

Second round
1	(Scotland) Marshall	8	8	2
(Wales) Morgan	9	5	1
(Scotland) Speirs	9	3	2
9	(Wales) Greenslade	4	10	0
(Australia) Glasson	7	5	1
13	(Northern Ireland) Ross	5	12	2
5	(Wales) Weale	8	7
(Northern Ireland) Booth	6	3

Quarter-finals
1	(Scotland) Marshall	8	9	2
(Scotland) Speirs	10	3	0
5	(Wales) Weale	8	7
13	(Northern Ireland) Ross	6	3

Semi-finals
1	(Scotland) Marshall	10	4	2
5	(Wales) Weale	5	7	0

==== Bottom half ====
First round
2	(Scotland) David Gourlay	11	10
(Northern Ireland) David Corkill	8	5
15	(England) Mark Royal	6	3
(Australia) Kelvin Kerkow	11	8
7	(Australia) Mark McMahon	12	9
(Northern Ireland) Gary McCloy	10	5
10	(Hong Kong) Noel Kennedy	9	11
(United States) Neil Furman	3	1
3	(Scotland) Paul Foster	10	1	2
(England) Chris Gale	8	10	0
14	(Wales) Stephen Rees	2	4
(England) Graham Smith	9	8
6	(England) Ian Bond	11	7
(Scotland) Wayne Hogg	5	6
11	(England) Greg Harlow	8	4
(England) Simon Skelton	8	11

Second round
2	(Scotland) Gourlay	5	5
(Australia) Kerkow	10	5
7	(Australia) McMahon	6	11	2
10	(Hong Kong) Kennedy	8	3	0
3	(Scotland) Foster	11	5	0
(England) Smith	6	7	2
6	(England) Bond	9	7
(Wales) Skelton	5	3

Quarter-finals
(Australia) Kerkow	5	8	1
7	(Australia) McMahon	6	4	2
3	(England) Smith	7	4	2
6	(England) Bond	6	11	1

Semi-finals
7	(Australia) McMahon	9	7	2
(England) Smith	4	12	1

=== Women's singles ===
First round
(England) Lynne Whitehead	10	8
(England) Cheryl Northall	5	5
(England) Sarah McKay	13	6
(Wales) Betty Morgan	7	6
(England) Carol Ashby	7	9
(England) Amy Monkhouse	6	5
(Scotland) Julie Forrest	9	0	2
(England) Ellen Falkner	8	11	1

Semi-finals
(England) Whitehead	12	4	2
(England) McKay	1	6	1
(England) Ashby	11	8
(Scotland) Forrest	4	3

Final
(England) Whitehead	8	7
(England) Ashby	9	12

=== Men's Pairs ===
First round
1	(England) David Holt (England) Chris Young	9	9
(England) Martin Phillips (England) Kevin Elkins	6	4
8	(England) Greg Harlow (Northern Ireland) Jonathan Ross	12	10
(Hong Kong) Loy Phillip D'Souza (Hong Kong) Randolph Lakoon	2	2
4	(Wales) Stephen Rees (Wales) John Price	9	8
(Wales) Jonathan Forey (Wales) Jeff Webley	3	2
5	(Wales) Jason Greenslade (Wales) Robert Weale	8	9	2
(New Zealand) Rowan Brassey (New Zealand) Jamie Hill	13	5	1
3	(Scotland) Alex Marshall (Scotland) Paul Foster	8	8
(Scotland) Willie Wood (Scotland) Craig MacFarlane	5	1
6	(England) Ian Bond (England) Andy Thomson	3	10	2
(Australia) Rob Thompson (Australia) Shane Globits	8	7	0
7	(England) Les Gillett (Hong Kong) Noel Kennedy	10	12
(South Africa) David Smith (South Africa) Pat Karam	5	3
2	(Scotland) David Gourlay (Australia) Mark McMahon	7	6
(Northern Ireland) Ian McClure (Northern Ireland) Jeremy Henry	7	7

Quarter-finals
1	(England) Holt (England) Young	11	8
8	(England) Harlow (Northern Ireland) Ross	0	4
4	(Wales) Rees (Wales) Price	8	1	0
5	(Wales) Greenslade (Wales) Weale	6	10	2
3	(Scotland) Marshall (Scotland) Foster	4	6
6	(England) Bond (England) Thomson	8	8
7	(England) Wynne Richards + (Hong Kong) Kennedy	3	4
(Northern Ireland) McClure (Northern Ireland) Henry	11	8

Semi-finals
1	(England) Holt (England) Young	9	6
5	(Wales) Weale (Wales) Greenslade	3	4
6	(England) Bond (England) Thomson	9	8	1
(Northern Ireland) Henry (Northern Ireland) McClure	10	3	2

Final
1	(England) Holt (England) Young	3	5
(Northern Ireland) Henry (Northern Ireland) McClure	14	11

+ Wynne Richards replaced the injured Les Gillett

=== Mixed Pairs ===
Quarter-finals
(Scotland) David Gourlay (Wales) Betty Morgan	7	7	2
(Wales) John Price (England) Sara McKay	8	6	0
(Scotland) Alex Marshall (England) Amy Monkhouse	13	12
(Australia) Mark McMahon (England) Ellen Falkner	5	2
(Wales) Robert Weale (England) Cheryl Northall	9	8
(Scotland) Paul Foster (England) Lynne Whitehead	8	8
(England) Andy Thomson (England) Carol Ashby	6	9	2
(England) Ian Bond (Scotland) Julie Forrest	7	4	0

Semi-finals
(Scotland) Gourlay (Wales) Morgan	6	4
(Scotland) Marshall (England) Monkhouse	10	9
(Wales) Weale (England) Northall	7	5	1
(England) Thomson (England) Ashby	5	7	2

Final
(Scotland) Marshall (England) Monkhouse	9	11	2
(England) Thomson (England) Ashby	10	7	0
