= Scottish International Open =

International indoor bowls competition

- Sport: Bowls
- Founded: 1989
- Continent: International (PBA / World Bowls Tour)

The Scottish International Open is an international indoor bowls competition held annually at in Scotland. It is the secondary event held by the organisation known as the World Bowls Tour, ranking behind their primary event, the World Indoor Bowls Championships.

== Past winners ==
Year	Winner	Runner-Up	Score	Ref
1989	(Scotland) Angus Blair	(Wales) John Price	7–6 7–5 7–5	
1990	(England) David Bryant	(England) Tony Allcock	7–5 5–7 7–4 1–7 7–5	
1991	(Wales) John Price (1/4)	(England) Gary Smith	7–2 7–6 7–3	
1992	(Scotland) Graham Robertson (1/3)	(Wales) John Price	5–7 7–6 7–4 7–2	
1993	(Scotland) Graham Robertson (2/3)	(Scotland) Richard Corsie	3–7 7–3 7–2 7–5	
1994	(Wales) John Price (2/4)	(Scotland) Graham Robertson	7–0 7–2 7–4	
1995	(Wales) John Price (3/4)	(England) Andy Thomson	7–3 0–7 7–4 7–5	
1996	(Scotland) Graham Robertson (3/3)	(Scotland) David Gourlay	7–5 7–4 7–3	
1997	(Wales) John Price (4/4)	(Scotland) Richard Corsie	7–0 7–3 7–4	
1998	(Scotland) Richard Corsie	(Scotland) Paul Foster	1–7 7–6 7–2 5–7 7–6	
1999	(Scotland) Darren Burnett (1/2)	(Australia) Mark McMahon	7–0 3–7 7–1 7–2	
2000	(England) Greg Moon	(Scotland) Darren Burnett	7–6 7–3	
2001	(Scotland) Darren Burnett (2/2)	(Wales) Mike Prosser	5–7 13–3 2–0	
2002	(Scotland) David Gourlay (1/2)	(Scotland) Darren Burnett	6–4 10–2	
2003	(England) Ian Bond (1/2)	(England) Greg Harlow	11–6 8–8	
2004	(Wales) Jason Greenslade	(Scotland) David Gourlay	8–8 10–1	
2005	(England) Ian Bond (2/2)	(Scotland) Alex Marshall	8–4 9–4	
2006	(Australia) Kelvin Kerkow	(Australia) David Gourlay	11–5 11–3	
2007	(England) Andy Thomson	(England) Mark Royal	11–5 8–5	
2008	(England) Greg Harlow (1/3)	(Wales) John Price	11–6 16–1	
2009	(Scotland) Paul Foster (1/3)	(England) Ian Bond	8–3 7–8 2–0	
2010	(England) Mervyn King	(Scotland) Stewart Anderson	7–5 8–5	
2011	(England) Robert Paxton	(England) Greg Harlow	2–11 10–2 2–0	
2012	(Scotland) Paul Foster (2/2)	(England) Nick Brett	11–5 9–8	
2013	(England) Nick Brett (1/2)	(Scotland) Paul Foster	5–7 9–6 2–1	
2014	(England) Nick Brett (2/2)	(Scotland) Paul Foster	5–10 9–6 2–0	
2015	(England) Greg Harlow (2/3)	(Wales) Jason Greenslade	11–4 6–8 2–1	
2016	(England) Greg Harlow (3/3)	(Scotland) Paul Foster	4–10 12–4 2–1	
2017	(Scotland) David Gourlay (2/2)	(Scotland) Michael Stepney	11–7 9–4	
2018	(Scotland) Stewart Anderson (1/4)	(Scotland) Paul Foster	8–6 12–4	
2019	(Scotland) Paul Foster (3/3)	(England) Nick Brett	10–4, 11–3	
2020 and 2021 cancelled due to COVID-19 pandemic				
2022	(Scotland) Stewart Anderson (2/4)	(England) Simon Skelton	10–4, 10–2	
2023	(Scotland) Stewart Anderson (3/4)	(England) Jamie Walker	12–6, 6–3	
2024	(Scotland) Jason Banks	(England) Aaron Johnson	9–8, 11–1	
2025	(Scotland) Stewart Anderson (4/4)	(England) Mark Dawes	5–5, 9–4	

Previous names

- Scottish Masters (1989–1997) (2001–2002)
- Glasgow Classic (1998–1999)
- British Isles Invitation (2000-2000)

== See also ==
World lawn and indoor bowls events
