= 2000 World Indoor Bowls Championship =

World Indoor Championships 2000
- 22nd World Indoor Bowls Championships
- Location: (England) Great Yarmouth, Norfolk
- Date(s): 10–29 January 2000 (men); 13–16 April 2000 (women)
- Category: World Indoor Championships

The 2000 Potters Holidays World World Indoor Bowls Championship was held at Potters Leisure Resort, Hopton on Sea, Great Yarmouth, England, from 10 to 23 January 2000, with the pairs following on from 26 to 29 January 2000.

In the singles Robert Weale won the title beating John Price in the final.

In the pairs final David Gourlay & Alex Marshall defeated Gary Smith & Andy Thomson.

The women's singles competition took place at the Watson Stadium in Belfast from April 13–16. The event was sponsored by Golden Charter and the title was won by Marlene Castle.

== Winners ==
Event	Winner
Men's Singles	(Wales) Robert Weale
Women's Singles	(New Zealand) Marlene Castle
Men's Pairs	(Scotland) David Gourlay & (Scotland) Alex Marshall

== Draw and results ==
=== First round ===
Player 1	Player 2	Score
(Australia) Ian Taylor	(Northern Ireland) Paul Daly	7-3 7-3 7-5
(New Zealand) Kerry Chapman	(South Africa) Neil Burkett	7-5 4-7 7-4 5-7 7-6
(Australia) Kevin Walsh	(Wales) Mark Anstey	7-6 7-0 7-5
(England) Ian Bond	(Hong Kong) Adam Poynton	7-3 7-6 7-6
(England) David Holt	(Northern Ireland) Michael Nutt	5-7 7-5 3-7 7-6 7-5
(South Africa) Gerry Baker	(Australia) Steve Glasson	4-7 7-5 7-2 7-1
(Hong Kong) Noel Kennedy	(Wales) Jonathan Forey	
(Scotland) Craig Richmond	(Northern Ireland) Jeremy Henry	7-6 3-7 7-5 4-7 7-2
(England) Robert Newman	(Canada) Nick Watkins	7-5 7-3 7-6
(Northern Ireland) Jonathan Ross	(Israel) Cecil Bransky	7-6 5-7 7-4 7-2
(England) Tony Allcock	(England) Martin Pulling	7-4 7-4 7-2
(England) Greg Harlow	(Scotland) Paul Conlan	7-5 7-3 7-6
(Wales) Les Saunders	(Northern Ireland) Neil Booth	2-7 7-4 7-5 7-5
(Wales) Nigel Williams	(England) Noel Burrows	4-7 7-4 7-2 7-2
(Scotland) Richard Corsie	(Jersey) Adrian Welch	7-5 7-2 7-3
(England) Billy Jackson	(Northern Ireland) David Corkill	7-6 5-7 7-4 7-4

=== Men's singles ===
Second round
1	(Scotland) Alex Marshall	7	7	2	5	7
(England) David Holt	2	0	7	7	5
16	(England) Wynne Richards	5	4	7	7	7
(Australia) Ian Taylor	7	7	1	0	5
8	(Australia) Mark McMahon	0
(South Africa) Gerry Baker	3
9	(Scotland) Paul Foster	7	5	7	5	1
(Hong Kong) Noel Kennedy	5	7	0	7	7
4	(England) Andy Thomson	7	7	7
(Scotland) Craig Richmond	3	2	1
13	(Wales) Robert Weale	7	7	7
(England) Robert Newman	2	5	4
5	(Wales) Stephen Rees	7	7	7
(Northern Ireland) Jonathan Ross	5	5	3
12	(Scotland) Graham Robertson	7	0	2	5
(England) Tony Allcock	5	7	7	7
3	(Wales) John Price	7	7	7
(New Zealand) Kerry Chapman	1	2	6
14	(England) Gary Smith	4	5	6
(Australia) Kevin Walsh	7	7	7
6	(Scotland) Hugh Duff	2	7	2	7	6
(England) Billy Jackson	7	6	7	6	7
11	(New Zealand) Rowan Brassey	7	5	6	3
(Scotland) Richard Corsie	3	7	7	7
2	(Scotland) David Gourlay	7	7	5	7
(Wales) Nigel Williams	1	5	7	2
15	(Wales) Jason Greenslade	1	1	3
(Wales) Les Saunders	7	7	7
7	(England) Mervyn King	2	6	4
(England) Ian Bond	7	7	7
10	(England) Les Gillett	1	7	7	7
(England) Greg Harlow	7	0	4	1

Third round
1	(Scotland) Marshall	7	1	7	7
16	(England) Richards	3	7	6	2
(South Africa) Baker	7	2	3	7	2
(Hong Kong) Kennedy	4	7	7	4	7
4	(England) Thomson	6	1	5
13	(Wales) Weale	7	7	7
5	(Wales) Rees	2	4	1
(England) Allcock	7	7	7
3	(Wales) Price	7	7	7
(Australia) Walsh	1	1	1
(England) Jackson	2	3	3
(Scotland) Corsie	7	7	7
2	(Scotland) Gourlay	6	7	7	7
(Wales) Saunders	7	3	2	3
(England) Bond	2	4	6
10	(England) Gillett	7	7	7

Quarter-finals
1	(Scotland) Marshall	4	7	7	7
(Hong Kong) Kennedy	7	0	4	3
13	(Wales) Weale	7	7	7
(England) Allcock	6	5	4
3	(Wales) Price	7	7	7
(Scotland) Corsie	3	4	2
2	(Scotland) Gourlay	7	2	7	6	6
10	(England) Gillett	0	7	4	7	7

Semi-finals
1	(Scotland) Marshall	3	7	5	7	1
13	(Wales) Weale	7	0	7	2	7
Final
13	(Wales) Weale	7	4	7	7
3	(Wales) Price	6	7	1	3
3	(Wales) Price	1	7	7	7
10	(England) Gillett	7	6	6	4

=== Men's Pairs ===
First round

Quarter-finals

Semi-finals

Final

1
(Wales) John Price

(Wales) Stephen Rees

7
7
7

(Scotland) Brian Stillie

(Scotland) Ian Sneddon

4
5
4

1
(Wales) Price

(Wales) Rees

3
7
7
1
7

8
(Scotland) Richard Corsie

(Scotland) Graham Robertson

7
7
5
7

8
(Scotland) Corsie

(Scotland) Robertson

7
1
6
7
6

(Wales) Peter Huntley

(Wales) Ian Slade

1
3
7
5

1
(Wales) Price

(Wales) Rees

7
2
6
4

4
(England) Gary Smith

(England) Andy Thomson

7
7
6
7

4
(England) Thomson

(England) Smith

6
7
7
7

(Northern Ireland) Robert Corry

(Northern Ireland) Roy Battersby

2
6
7
6

4
(England) Smith

(England) Thomson

7
7
7

5
(New Zealand) Rowan Brassey

(Australia) Mark McMahon

5
7
7
3
5

(England) Lockhart

(England) Holt

4
4
1

(England) David Lockhart

(England) David Holt

7
1
5
7
7

4
(England) Smith

(England) Thomson

7
5
6
7
2

2
(Scotland) David Gourlay

(Scotland) Alex Marshall

7
7
7

2
(Scotland) Gourlay

(Scotland) Marshall

4
7
7
6
7

(Australia) Ian Taylor

(England) Billy Jackson

0
4
6

2
(Scotland) Gourlay

(Scotland) Marshall

0
7
7
1
7

7
(England) Les Gillett

(England) Robert Newman

7
3
4
7
7

7
(England) Newman

(England) Gillett

7
4
5
7
3

(Northern Ireland) Jonathan Ross

(England) Ian Bond

6
7
7
4
6

2
(Scotland) Gourlay

(Scotland) Marshall

7
7
4
7

3
(Scotland) Hugh Duff

(Scotland) Paul Foster

7
2
7
6
7

3
(Scotland) Foster

(Scotland) Duff

3
2
7
0

(England) Wynne Richards

(England) Tony Allcock

2
7
3
7
4

3
(Scotland) Duff

(Scotland) Foster

7
7
6
2
7

6
(England) Greg Harlow

(England) Mervyn King

7
2
5
4

(Wales) Greenslade

(Wales) Weale

3
6
7
7
4

(Wales) Jason Greenslade

(Wales) Robert Weale

2
7
7
7

=== Women's singles ===
Quarter-finals
(New Zealand) Marlene Castle	1	7	5	7	7
(Northern Ireland) Phillis Nolan	7	3	7	5	5
(England) Ann Knott	7	7	2	7
(Australia) Karen Murphy	3	4	7	3
(Northern Ireland) Margaret Johnston	7	7	6	7
(Wales) Julie Davies	2	0	7	6
(Scotland) Kate Adams	7	6	7	7
(Scotland) Caroline McAllister	1	7	2	5

Semi-finals
(New Zealand) Castle	7	7	7
(England) Knott	6	4	4
(Northern Ireland) Johnston	7	3	7	7
(Scotland) Adams	5	7	4	2

Final
(New Zealand) Castle	7	1	5	7	7
(Northern Ireland) Johnston	1	7	7	3	1
