= 2009 World Indoor Bowls Championship =

Bowls championship held in Great Yarmouth, Norfolk

World Indoor Championships 2009
- 31st World Indoor Bowls Championships
- Location: (England) Great Yarmouth, Norfolk
- Date: 05-26 January 2009.
- Category: World Indoor Championships

The 2009 World Indoor Bowls Championships was held at Potters Leisure Resort, Hopton on Sea, Great Yarmouth, England, from 05-26 January 2009. The event was sponsored by Potters Holidays.

Billy Jackson won the Men's singles defeating Robert Weale in the final.

== Winners ==
Event	Winner
Men's Singles	(England) Billy Jackson
Women's Singles	(England) Debbie Stavrou
Men's Pairs	(Australia) Kelvin Kerkow & (England) Mervyn King
Mixed Pairs	(Australia) David Gourlay & (Australia) Ceri Ann Davies

== Draw and results ==
=== Men's singles ===
==== Finals ====
Semi-finals
16	(England) Skelton	3	7
12	(England) Jackson	8	9
14	(England) McMahon	4	3
10	(Wales) Weale	10	8

Final
12	(England) Jackson	11	10
10	(Wales) Weale	6	10

==== Top half ====
First round
1	(Scotland) Alex Marshall	10	6
(England) Robert Paxton	5	5
16	(England) Simon Skelton	9	6	2
(Northern Ireland) Jeremy Henry	6	7	1
8	(England) Andy Thomson	12	9
(England) Graham Smith	6	7
9	(England) Ian Bond	5	8	2
(England) Stephen Tuohy	7	3	0
12	(England) Billy Jackson	7	8
(Wales) Richard Morgan	5	4
5	(Scotland) Paul Foster	9	10
(New Zealand) Denis Leeden	4	6
13	(England) Les Gillett	8	7
(Wales) John Price	5	7
4	(Wales) Jason Greenslade	7	7
(New Zealand) Phil Skoglund	6	5

Second round
1	(Scotland) Marshall	7	6
16	(England) Skelton	8	8
8	(England) Thomson	10	7	2
9	(England) Bond	6	11	1
12	(England) Jackson	2	7	2
5	(Scotland) Foster	9	4	1
13	(England) Gillett	10	7
4	(Wales) Greenslade	5	7

Quarter-finals
16	(England) Skelton	7	11
8	(England) Thomson	6	11
12	(England) Jackson	7	12
13	(England) Gillett	4	1

Semi-finals
16	(England) Skelton	3	7
12	(England) Jackson	8	9

==== Bottom half ====
First round
14	(England) Mark McMahon	9	6	2
(Scotland) Darren Burnett	6	10	1
3	(Australia) David Gourlay	5	9	2
(England) Paul Coleman	9	6	1
6	(England) Mark Royal	10	9
(Australia) Dean Barker	1	1
11	(Australia) Kelvin Kerkow	10	8
(New Zealand) Brian Cathro	4	7
10	(Wales) Robert Weale	9	9
(South Africa) Johann du Plessis	2	8
7	(England) Mervyn King	11	3	2
(England) Tim Stone	1	8	1
15	(Northern Ireland) Jonathan Ross	6	10
(Scotland) Colin Walker	4	7
2	(England) Greg Harlow	9	7
(Wales) Jonathan Tomlinson	9	5

Second round
14	(England) McMahon	8	11	2
3	(Australia) Gourlay	3	12	1
6	(England) Royal	4	8	2
11	(Australia) Kerkow	9	6	0
10	(Wales) Weale	8	2	2
7	(England) King	6	8	0
15	(Northern Ireland) Ross	5	4
2	(England) Harlow	5	9

Quarter-finals
14	(England) McMahon	7	6	2
6	(England) Royal	8	5	1
10	(Wales) Weale	2	8	2
2	(England) Harlow	7	5	1

Semi-finals
14	(England) McMahon	4	3
10	(Wales) Weale	10	8

=== Men's Pairs ===
First round

Quarter-finals

Semi-finals

Final

1
(England) Ian Bond

(England) Andy Thomson

8
8

(New Zealand) Paul Girdler

(New Zealand) Ken Walker

4
4

1
(England) Bond

(England) Thomson

7
9

8
(Northern Ireland) Jonathan Ross

(England) Simon Skelton

9
3
2

8
(England) Skelton

(Northern Ireland) Ross

5
1

(Scotland) Chris McGready

(Scotland) Ross Dennis

4
12
0

1
(England) Bond

(England) Thomson

4
4

4
(Australia) David Gourlay

(England) Billy Jackson

11
10

4
(Australia) Gourlay

(England) Jackson

8
8

(Australia) Richard Strawbridge

(Australia) Steve Halmai

2
6

4
(Australia) Gourlay

(England) Jackson

8
8
2

5
(Wales) Jason Greenslade

(Wales) Robert Weale

11
5
2

5
(Wales) Greenslade

(Wales) Weale

9
6
1

(England) Neil Chandler

(England) David Howes

2
7
0

4
(Australia) Gourlay

(England) Jackson

7
8

2
(Scotland) Alex Marshall

(Scotland) Paul Foster

9
5
1

6
(Australia) Kerkow

(England) King

9
8

(Northern Ireland) Jeremy Henry

(Northern Ireland) Ian McClure

3
7
2

(Northern Ireland) Henry

(Northern Ireland) McClure

4
3

7
(England) Les Gillett

(Wales) Richard Morgan

12
10

7
(England) Gillett

(Wales) Morgan

8
7

(Israel) Boaz Markus

(Israel) Lawrence Hurwitz

3
4

7
(England) Gillett

(Wales) Morgan

6
5

3
(England) Mark Royal

(England) Greg Harlow

7
1

6
(Australia) Kerkow

(England) King

9
5

(Wales) Mark Harding

(Wales) Phil Rowlands

7
10

(Wales) Harding

(Wales) Rowlands

5
7

6
(Australia) Kelvin Kerkow

(England) Mervyn King

8
7

6
(Australia) Kerkow

(England) King

7
8

(South Africa) Rino Lozzi

(South Africa) Craig Rimmington

5
5

=== Women's singles ===
First round
(England) Debbie Stavrou
bye
(England) Ellen Falkner	7	7
(Norfolk Island) Carmen Anderson	6	7
(England) Sarah Seymour	11	10
(United States) Rosa Gandara	4	4
(New Zealand) Desiree Lambert
bye
(Guernsey) Alison Merrien	13	9
(United States) Lorraine Hitchcock	2	4
(Australia) Ceri Ann Davies
bye
(England) Carol Ashby	7	9
bye	6	7
(Scotland) Claire Johnston	7	8	2
(England) Julie Saunders	8	7	0

Second round
(England) Stavrou	5	3	2
(England) Falkner	10	10	1
(England) Seymour	11	10
(New Zealand) Lambert	2	3
(Guernsey) Merrien	11	9
(Australia) Davies	6	1
(England) Ashby	10	5	2
(Scotland) Johnston	1	6	0

Quarter-finals
(England) Stavrou	8	11
(England) Seymour	8	5
(Guernsey) Merrien	9	7	2
(England) Ashby	4	8	0

Semi-finals
(England) Stavrou	12	6	2
(Guernsey) Merrien	7	7	1

=== Mixed Pairs ===
Quarter-finals
(Scotland) David Gourlay & (Australia) Ceri Ann Davies	7	11
(England) Mervyn King & (England) Carol Ashby	2	5
(Wales) Jason Greenslade & (United States) Lorraine Hitchcock	8	9
(Scotland) Paul Foster & (New Zealand) Desiree Lambert	7	6
(England) Mark Royal & (England) Sarah Seymour	6	10
(England) Greg Harlow & (United States) Rosa Gandara	6	4
(Scotland) Alex Marshall & (England) Debbie Stavrou	9	12
(England) Andy Thomson & (Guernsey) Alison Merrien	3	3

Semi-finals
(Scotland) Gourlay & (Australia) Davies	9	10
(Wales) Greenslade & (United States) Hitchcock	4	5
(England) Royal & (England) Seymour	5	10	2
(Scotland) Marshall & (England) Stavrou	6	5	1

Final
(Scotland) Gourlay & (Australia) Davies	11	12
(England) Royal & (England) Seymour	2	0
