= 2008 World Indoor Bowls Championship =

Bowls championship held in Great Yarmouth, Norfolk

World Indoor Championships 2008
- 30th World Indoor Bowls Championships
- Location: (England) Great Yarmouth, Norfolk
- Date(s): 08-27, January, 2008.
- Category: World Indoor Championships

The 2008 World Indoor Bowls Championships was held at Potters Leisure Resort, Hopton on Sea, Great Yarmouth, England, from 08-27 January 2008. The event was sponsored by Potters Holidays.
Alex Marshall won the men's singles defeating Ian Bond in the final achieving a record fifth title. Despite the fact that a women's singles tournament was held Ceri Ann Davies also competed in the men's singles competition, and became the first woman to win matches in the final stages of the event with victories over Glenn Skipp in the preliminary round, and Jamie Hill in the first round.

== Winners ==
Event	Winner
Men's Singles	(Scotland) Alex Marshall
Women's Singles	(Australia) Ceri Ann Davies
Men's Pairs	(England) Andy Thomson & (England) Ian Bond
Mixed Pairs	(Australia) David Gourlay & (Australia) Ceri Ann Davies

== Draw and results ==
=== Men's singles ===
First round
1	(Scotland) Alex Marshall	11	8	2
(Republic of Ireland) Gary Kelly	2	9	0
16	(New Zealand) Jamie Hill	10	1	0
(Australia) Ceri Ann Davies +	4	11	2
8	(Australia) Kelvin Kerkow	6	8	2
(England) Adam Tidby	7	7	0
9	(England) Mervyn King	10	9
(England) Danny Brown	5	1
4	(Scotland) Paul Foster	11	10
(Wales) David Axon	6	2
13	(England) Billy Jackson	12	11
(Australia) Steve Glasson	1	5
5	(Wales) Jason Greenslade	5	10	2
(Scotland) John McHutcheson	10	4	0
12	(England) Mark Royal	16	10
(South Africa) Robin Ashby	0	0
3	(England) Greg Harlow	9	3
(England) Simon Skelton	9	10
14	(England) Les Gillett	9	10
(England) Andrew Ware	5	3
6	(Wales) Robert Weale	7	7
(England) Stephen Knight	7	8
11	(England) Mark McMahon	10	5	1
(New Zealand) Neil Fisher	6	7	2
2	(Scotland) David Gourlay	8	4	0
(England) Graham Smith	3	9	2
15	(Wales) John Price	10	11
(England) Danny Denison	7	4
7	(England) Andy Thomson	9	11
(England) Philip Last	4	0
10	(England) Ian Bond	6	10	2
(New Zealand) Terry Johnson	9	6	1

Second round
1	(Scotland) Marshall	6	6	2
(Australia) Davies+	5	8	0
8	(Australia) Kerkow	9	6	0
9	(England) King	2	8	2
4	(Scotland) Foster	7	3
13	(England) Jackson	7	8
5	(Wales) Greenslade	6	5
12	(England) Royal	6	8
(England) Skelton	9	11
14	(England) Gillett	3	11
(England) Knight	4	9	2
(New Zealand) Fisher	9	7	0
(England) Smith	7	9
15	(Wales) Price	6	9
7	(England) Thomson	3	10	1
10	(England) Bond	11	6	2

Quarter-finals
1	(Scotland) Marshall	6	10
9	(England) King	5	2
13	(England) Jackson	7	5
12	(England) Royal	6	5
(England) Skelton	7	10
(England) Knight	5	9
(England) Smith	7	4
10	(England) Bond	9	11

Semi-finals
1	(Scotland) Marshall	10	8
13	(England) Jackson	6	3
(England) Skelton	5	4
10	(England) Bond	5	9

Final
1	(Scotland) Marshall	10	11
10	(England) Bond	2	5

=== Men's Pairs ===
First round

Quarter-finals

Semi-finals

Final

1
(Australia) David Gourlay

(England) Billy Jackson

9
11

(Scotland) Stewart Anderson

(Scotland) John Candlish

4
3

1
(Australia) Gourlay

(England) Jackson

10
7

8
(England) Les Gillett

(Wales) Richard Morgan

9
8
2

8
(England) Gillett

(Wales) Morgan

7
4

(Australia) Ray Pearse

(Australia) Bernie Melville

6
9
0

1
(Australia) Gourlay

(England) Jackson

5
6

4
(Wales) Jason Greenslade

(Wales) Robert Weale

9
5
1

5
(England) Bond

(England) Thomson

10
6

(England) Gary Kelly

(England) Simon Colvin

5
8
2

(England) Kelly

(England) Colvin

2
5

5
(England) Ian Bond

(England) Andy Thomson

9
10

5
(England) Thomson

(England) Bond

9
9

(Wales) Mark Harding

(Wales) Phil Rowlands

5
8

5
(England) Thomson

(England) Bond

4
11
2

2
(England) Greg Harlow

(England) Mark McMahon

11
5
2

2
(England) Harlow

(England) McMahon

11
6
1

(England) Neil Smith

(England) Adam Tidby

5
10
1

2
(England) Harlow

(England) McMahon

7
9

7
(England) Mark Royal

(Wales) John Price

11
8

7
(England) Royal

(Wales) Price

2
4

(New Zealand) Paul Girdler

(New Zealand) Ken Walker

6
6

2
(England) Harlow

(England) McMahon

8
11

3
(Scotland) Alex Marshall

(Scotland) Paul Foster

8
12

3
(Scotland) Marshall

(Scotland) Foster

8
5

(South Africa) Steve Martitz

(South Africa) Louis Fourie

6
2

3
(Scotland) Marshall

(Scotland) Foster

12
9

6
(Australia) Kelvin Kerkow

(England) Mervyn King

12
9

6
(Australia) Kerkow

(England) King

9
3

(Canada) Francis Yau

(Canada) Jamie MacGowan

2
5

=== Women's singles ===
First round
(Australia) Ceri Ann Davies	13	7
(New Zealand) Linda Ralph	3	3
(Scotland) Caroline Brown
bye
(New Zealand) Desiree Lambert	7	11
(United States) Mary Ann Beath	4	2
(Scotland) Claire Johnston
bye
(England) Debbie Stavrou
bye
(Guernsey) Alison Merrien	11	9
(Scotland) Karen Dawson	4	5
(England) Carol Ashby	7	9
bye	6	7
(Australia) Georgia White	11	11
(England) Helen Tuohy	2	3

Second round
(Australia) Davies	9	9
(Scotland) Brown	8	9
(New Zealand) Lambert	5	10	2
(Scotland) Johnston	8	4	1
(England) Stavrou	9	11
(Guernsey) Merrien	7	4
(England) Ashby	10	14
(Australia) White	6	2

Quarter-finals
(Australia) Davies	14	9
(New Zealand) Lambert	1	3
(England) Stavrou	8	2	2
(England) Ashby	5	12	0

Semi-finals
(Australia) Davies	11	10
(England) Stavrou	7	1

=== Mixed Pairs ===
Quarter-finals
(Scotland) David Gourlay & (Australia) Ceri Ann Davies	7	8
(Wales) Robert Weale & (New Zealand) Desire Lambert	5	7
(Scotland) Paul Foster & (New Zealand) Linda Ralph	8	7	2
(England) Andy Thomson & (England) Debbie Stavrou	5	9	1
(Wales) Jason Greenslade & (Australia) Georgia White	5	7	1
(England) Greg Harlow & (Scotland) Claire Johnston	10	6	2
(Scotland) Alex Marshall & (Scotland) Caroline Brown	9	8
(England) Mervyn King & (England) Carol Ashby	7	7

Semi-finals
(Scotland) Gourlay & (Australia) Davies	12	12
(Scotland) Foster & (New Zealand) Ralph	2	5
(Wales) Harlow & (Scotland) Johnston	3	3
(Scotland) Marshall & (Scotland) Brown	9	10

Final
(Scotland) Gourlay & (Australia) Davies	10	5	2
(Scotland) Marshall & (Scotland) Brown	7	11	1
