= 1994 World Indoor Bowls Championship =

World Indoor Championships 1994
- 16th World Indoor Bowls Championships
- Location: (England) Preston, Lancashire
- Date: 21 February - 6 March 1994
- Category: World Indoor Championships

The 1994 Churchill Insurance World Indoor Bowls Championship was held at Preston Guild Hall, Preston, England, from 21 February until 6 March 1994. Churchill Insurance signed a new three-year deal worth £750,000 to sponsor the event, taking over from Midland Bank.
Andy Thomson won his first title beating Richard Corsie in the final.
In the Men's Pairs final Ian Schuback & Cameron Curtis defeated the defending champions Andy Thomson & Gary Smith.

The Women's World Championship was held in Cumbernauld from April 24–25 and was sponsored by Churchill Insurance. The winner was Jan Woodley.

== Winners ==
Event	Winner
Men's Singles	(England) Andy Thomson
Women's Singles	(Scotland) Jan Woodley
Men's Pairs	(Australia) Ian Schuback & (Australia) Cameron Curtis

== Draw and results ==
=== Men's singles ===
First round
1	(Scotland) Richard Corsie	3
(Northern Ireland) Ian McClure	1
16	(England) Mervyn King	3
(Israel) Jeff Rabkin	1
8	(Australia) Robert Parrella	1
(Guernsey) Adrian Welch	3
9	(England) David Bryant	2
(Australia) Ian Taylor	3
4	(Wales) John Price	3
(Canada) Steve Forrest	0
13	(Hong Kong) Mark McMahon	3
(New Zealand) Gary Lawson	0
5	(England) Gary Smith	3
(New Zealand) Sid Giddy	1
12	(Scotland) Graham Robertson	3
(South Africa) Kevin Campbell	0
3	(Australia) Ian Schuback	2
(Scotland) David Hendry	3
14	(Scotland) Willie Wood	3
(Wales) David Evans	1
6	(England) Andy Thomson	3
(Scotland) Andy Blair	0
11	(Scotland) Jim McCann	1
(Northern Ireland) Neil Booth	3
2	(England) Tony Allcock	3
(Jersey) Brian Bisson	0
15	(England) Wynne Richards	3
(Wales) Len Webley	1
7	(Scotland) Hugh Duff	3
(Australia) Cameron Curtis	1
10	(Wales) Stephen Rees	3
(England) Russell Morgan	1

Second round
1	(Scotland) Corsie	3
16	(England) King	2
(Guernsey) Welch	1
(Australia) Taylor	3
4	(Wales) Price	2
13	(Hong Kong) McMahon	3
5	(England) Smith	1
12	(Scotland) Robertson	3
(Scotland) Hendry	1
14	(Scotland) Wood	3
6	(England) Thomson	3
(Northern Ireland) Booth	1
2	(England) Allcock	2
15	(England) Richards	3
7	(Scotland) Duff	2
10	(Wales) Rees	3

Quarter-finals
1	(Scotland) Corsie	3
(Australia) Taylor	2
13	(Hong Kong) McMahon	3
12	(Scotland) Robertson	1
14	(Scotland) Wood	2
6	(England) Thomson	3
15	(England) Richards	0
10	(Wales) Rees	3

Semi-finals
1	(Scotland) Corsie	3
13	(Hong Kong) McMahon	1
Final
1	(Scotland) Corsie	2	0	7	6
6	(England) Thomson	7	7	6	7
6	(England) Thomson	3
10	(Wales) Rees	2

=== Men's Pairs ===
First round

Quarter-finals

Semi-finals

Final

1
(England) Andy Thomson

(England) Gary Smith

3

(Scotland) Frazer Marshall

(Scotland) Robert Muirhead

0

1
(England) Smith

(England) Thomson

3

8
(Australia) Robert Parrella

(Australia) Ian Taylor

3

8
(Australia) Parrella

(Australia) Taylor

1

(Wales) Brian Relland

(Wales) Damian Kelly

0

1
(England) Smith

(England) Thomson

3

4
(Wales) John Price

(Wales) Stephen Rees

3

4
(Wales) Price

(Wales) Rees

0

(Hong Kong) Mark McMahon

(Canada) Steve Forrest

1

4
(Wales) Price

(Wales) Rees

3

5
(Scotland) Richard Corsie

(Scotland) Alex Marshall

3

5
(Scotland) Marshall

(Scotland) Corsie

1

(England) Russell Morgan

(England) Wynne Richards

1

1
(England) Smith

(England) Thomson

1
5
7
0

2
(England) Tony Allcock

(England) David Bryant

3

3
(Australia) Schuback

(Australia) Curtis

7
7
5
7

(New Zealand) Gary Lawson

(New Zealand) Sid Giddy

1

2
(England) Allcock

(England) Bryant

3

7
(Northern Ireland) David Corkill

(Northern Ireland) Alan McMullan

3

7
(Northern Ireland) Corkill

(Northern Ireland) McMullan

1

(England) Keith Renwick

(England) Dave Williams

0

2
(England) Allcock

(England) Bryant

1

3
(Australia) Ian Schuback

(Australia) Cameron Curtis

3

3
(Australia) Schuback

(Australia) Curtis

3

(Northern Ireland) Jeremy Henry

(Northern Ireland) Ian McClure

0

3
(Australia) Schuback

(Australia) Curtis

3

6
(South Africa) Kevin Campbell

(Israel) Jeff Rabkin

3

6
(South Africa) Campbell

(Israel) Rabkin

1

(Jersey) Brian Bisson

(Guernsey) Adrian Welch

1

=== Women's singles ===
Quarter-finals
(Scotland) Jan Woodley	1	0	7	7	7
(Scotland) Kate Adams	7	7	6	5	0
(Guernsey) Anne Simon	7	6	7	0	7
(Guernsey) Jackie Nicolle	0	7	6	7	2
(Northern Ireland) Margaret Johnston	1	2	4
(England) Mary Price	7	7	7
(Scotland) Jeanette Conlan	7	7	7
(Jersey) Val Stead	2	6	3

Semi-finals
(Scotland) Woodley	7	7	7
(Guernsey) Simon	3	6	5
(England) Price	7	0	7	7
(Scotland) Conlan	3	7	2	5

Final
(Scotland) Woodley	5	7	7	5	7
(England) Price	7	1	5	7	5
