= Great British Mobility Group =

The Great British Mobility Group
- Type: Private
- Industry: Mobility Aids
- Founded: 2004
- Founder: Tim Hedgecock
- Defunct: July 7, 2016
- Headquarters: Brinsea, North Somerset, England
- Area served: Great Britain
- Products: Adjustable Beds, Lift Chairs
- Number of employees: 29
- Parent: The Mobility Rental Group Ltd

Great British Mobility Group Ltd. was a U.K based company that supplied mobility aids such as electric adjustable beds and rise and recline chairs. They specialised in British made mobility products for the elderly and disabled. The company went into administration in 2012 and was dissolved on 7 July 2016.

== History ==
Tim Hedgecock originally started selling rise and recline chairs in 2004 and with his partner founded the Grey Chair Company Ltd.. In 2005 this was followed with the founding of the Grey Bed Company Ltd. supplying adjustable beds for people with impaired mobility. In September 2005 the two companies were merged to form The Great British Mobility Group.

Since founding, The Grey Mobility Group has been based in North Somerset, initially in Congresbury then Hewish, close to Weston-Super-Mare. The company headquarters are now located in the Hamlet of Brinsea in North Somerset where the company was originally formed. They originally had a warehouse at Colonnade Point in ProLogis Park, Coventry which opened in 2007 and have currently opened a new distribution warehouse in Coventry during February 2012.

The Grey Mobility Group Ltd was put into administration in January 2012, due to debts to trade creditors totalling £3m. In February 2012, the assets and intellectual property of the company were sold to the main creditor The Mobility Rental Group Ltd. by insolvency practitioners Begbies Traynor. During the restructuring, all 27 employees' jobs were saved. Under the restructuring, Great British Mobility still fills all customer orders and trades under the same company name.

Phillip John Gorman and Peter Richard James frost of Hazelwoods LLP, Windsor House, Barnett Way, Barnwood, Gloucester GL4 3RT were appointed joint supervisors of the company on 28 July 2012 pursuant to Part 1 of the Insolvency Act. whereby a Company Voluntary Arrangement had been put in place.

== Philanthropy ==
Grey Mobility sponsored the Scottish International Bowls Tournament for the 2006–07 and 2007-2008 seasons. The company also hosted a golf tournament to raise money for charity. In 2009, they raised £20,000 for the St Andrew's Church in Congresbury and other local organisations at a golf tournament.
