= 1985 World Indoor Bowls Championship =

Bowls event

1985 World Indoor Championships
- 7th World Indoor Bowls Championships
- Location: (Scotland) Coatbridge, North Lanarkshire
- Date(s): 5–10 February 1985
- Category: World Indoor Championships
- Prize money: £6,000

The 1985 Embassy World Indoor Bowls Championship was held at the Coatbridge indoor bowling club, North Lanarkshire, Scotland, 5–10 February 1985. Terry Sullivan won the title beating Cecil Bransky in the final 21–18.

== Men's singles ==
First round
(Wales) Terry Sullivan	21
(Northern Ireland) Michael Dunlop	12
(England) Nigel Smith	21
(Scotland) Bob Sutherland	5
(Australia) Don Peoples	21
(Jersey) Graham Tredant	11
(Northern Ireland) Sammy Allen	21
(England) David Bryant	20
(Israel) Cecil Bransky	21
(Hong Kong) George Souza	12
(Wales) John Russell Evans	21
(New Zealand) Keith Slight	9
(Northern Ireland) Jim Baker	21
(Scotland) Frank McCartney	18
(Canada) Ronnie Jones	21
(England) Andy Ross	6

Quarter-finals
(Wales) Sullivan	21
(England) Smith	11
(Australia) Peoples	21
(Northern Ireland) Allen	13
(Israel) Bransky	21
(Wales) Evans	19
(Northern Ireland) Baker	21
(Canada) Jones	11

Semi-finals
(Wales) Sullivan	21
(Australia) Peoples	17
(Israel) Bransky	21
(Northern Ireland) Baker	20

Final
(Wales) Sullivan	21
(Israel) Bransky	18
