= Betty Brown (bowls) =

Scottish bowls player

Personal information
- Nationality: Scotland
Medal record
Representing Scotland
World Indoor Bowls Championships
Gold medal – first place	2001 Llanelli	Women's singles

Betty Brown from Auchinleck is a Scottish international indoor and lawn bowler.

Brown won the Women's singles at the 2001 World Indoor Bowls Championship defeating Marilyn Peddell in the final.
