= Terry Sullivan (bowls) =

British

Personal information
- Nationality: British (Welsh)
- Born: 6 November 1935 (age 90)
- Occupation: President
- Employer: Swansea Bowling Association

Sport
- Club: Swansea IBC; Old Landorians; Oystermouth BC
Medal record
Representing Wales
World Indoor Bowls Championships
Gold medal – first place	1985 Coatbridge	Men's singles

Terry Sullivan (born 6 November 1935) is a Welsh former international indoor and outdoor bowler. He is the President of the Swansea Bowling Association and has held this role since 2020.

== Biography ==
Sullivan, an electrical works manager by trade, became a Welsh international in 1980. He won the Welsh National singles indoor title in February 1983.

After winning the CIS UK Indoor singles at Preston in 1984, he achieved his greatest moment when winning the 1985 World Indoor Bowls Championship crown.

Outdoors he won the 1990 pairs title at the Welsh National Bowls Championships with Stephen Rees.

Later, he continued to bowl locally as a member of the Oystermouth Bowls Club in Swansea.
