= Marilyn Peddell =

Australian bowls player

Personal information
- Nationality: Australian
Medal record
Representing Australia
World Outdoor Championships
Gold medal – first place	1996 Leamington Spa	fours
Commonwealth Games
Silver medal – second place	1998 Kuala Lumpur	fours
Asia Pacific Bowls Championships
Gold medal – first place	1997 Warilla	fours
Silver medal – second place	1997 Warilla	pairs
Bronze medal – third place	2001 Melbourne	singles

Marilyn Gay Peddell is an international lawn and indoor bowls competitor for Australia, from Bribie Island.

== Bowls career ==
In 1996, Peddell won the gold medal in the fours at the 1996 World Outdoor Bowls Championship in Adelaide. Two years later she won a silver medal at the 1998 Commonwealth Games in the fours. In addition she finished runner-up to Betty Brown in the 2001 World Indoor Bowls Championship at Great Yarmouth.

She won three medals at the Asia Pacific Bowls Championships including a 1997 fours gold medal in Warilla.

She won the Kingscliff Pairs in 1996 and in 2002 and has won the Queensland Champion of Champions singles title in 2008 and 2009.

She was the runner-up in the 'W.I.B.C.' Ladies Singles for the Christine Peacock Trophy in 2000/2001. She lost the last game of the Asia Pacific championship which cost her the gold medal, and she was afterwards excluded from the Australian team in 2002. A portrait of her was hung in the Archibald Prize in 2000.
