= Cameron Curtis =

Australian lawn and indoor bowler and coach

Personal information
- Born: 1971 Manly, New South Wales, Australia
Medal record
Representing Australia
World Outdoor Championships
Bronze medal – third place	1996 Adelaide	pairs
Bronze medal – third place	1996 Adelaide	fours
Commonwealth Games
Gold medal – first place	1994	Men's pairs
World Indoor Championships
Gold medal – first place	1994	Men's pairs
Asia Pacific Bowls Championships
Gold medal – first place	1993 Victoria	singles
Silver medal – second place	1993 Victoria	pairs

Cameron Curtis is an Australian lawn and indoor bowler and coach.

== Bowls career ==
=== International ===
Cameron won the 1994 World Indoor Bowls Championship partnering Ian Schuback. In the same year he won the Pairs Gold Medal at the 1994 Commonwealth Games in Victoria, Canada. Curtis became the national coach for Australia and led the team to a record medal haul at the 2006 Commonwealth Games.

He won a gold and silver medal at the 1993 Asia Pacific Bowls Championships, in Victoria, Canada.

== National ==
Curtis won the 1990 Australian National Bowls Championships in the fours.
