= Jan Woodley =

Personal information
- Nationality: Scotland
Medal record
Representing Scotland
World Indoor Bowls Championships
Gold medal – first place	1994 Cumbernauld	Women's singles

Jannet White Woodley (Jan Woodley) is a Scottish international indoor and lawn bowler.

Jan won the Women's singles at the 1994 World Indoor Bowls Championship defeating Mary Price in the final.
