= 1983 World Indoor Bowls Championship =

Bowls competition

World Indoor Championships 1983
- 5th World Indoor Bowls Championships
- Location: (Scotland) Coatbridge, North Lanarkshire
- Date: 8-13 February 1983.
- Category: World Indoor Championships

The 1983 Embassy World Indoor Bowls Championship was held at the Coatbridge indoor bowling club, North Lanarkshire, Scotland, 8–13 February 1983.
Bob Sutherland won the title beating Burnham Gill in the final 21-10. David Bryant defeated Clive White 21–11 in the third place play off.

== Men's singles ==
First round
(Scotland) Bob Sutherland	21
(New Zealand) Jim Scott	11
(Scotland) John Fullarton	21
(Hong Kong) Philip Chok	9
(England) David Bryant	21
(Wales) John Squires	16
(Zimbabwe) Garin Beare	21
(Scotland) Willy McQueen	16
(Canada) Burnham Gill	21
(England) Tony Allcock	20
(Scotland) John Watson	21
(England) Mike Luker	17
(Australia) Clive White	21
(United States) Bobby McGaffney	2
(Scotland) Willie Wood	21
Billy McKelvey	11

Quarter-finals
(Scotland) Sutherland	21
(Scotland) Fullarton	10
(England) Bryant	21
(Zimbabwe) Beare	9
(Canada) Gill	21
(Scotland) Watson	18
(Australia) White	21
(Scotland) Wood	14

Semi-finals
(Scotland) Sutherland	21
(England) Bryant	20
(Canada) Gill	21
(Australia) White	12

Final
(Scotland) Sutherland	21
(Canada) Gill	10
