= World Indoor Bowls Championships =

International lawn bowl competition

- Current season, competition or edition: 2026 World Indoor Bowls Championship
- Sport: Bowls
- Founded: 1979
- Continent: International (Professional Bowls Association / World Bowls Tour)
- Most recent champions: 2026 Open singles (England) Robert Paxton; 2026 Women's singles (England) Katherine Rednall; 2026 Open pairs (Scotland) Paul Foster & (Scotland) Alex Marshall; 2026 Mixed pairs (Northern Ireland) Chloe Wilson & (England) Jamie Walker
- Broadcasters: BBC Two, YouTube

The World Indoor Bowls Championship is an international bowls competition held annually at Potters Resorts in Hopton on Sea.

In recent history matches are streamed live on YouTube & Facebook, attracting around four million views annually. The last week of the competition is televised live on BBC where the open singles and open pairs', women's singles and mixed pairs' finals are shown.

== History ==
The competition was first held in 1979 in Coatbridge, Scotland as a men's singles only event. The first event was sponsored by Embassy Cigarettes.

In 1986, the men's pairs competition was added to the championship. In 1988, a rule change allowed women to compete for the first time and the women's singles competition was created. This rule change also changed expanded the men's singles and pairs competition and both become open tournaments.

In 1989, the championships moved to the Guild Hall in Preston, England and Churchill Insurance took over the sponsorship. While the competition was being held in Preston, Midland Bank and SAGA were also sponsors at various times.

In 1999, Potters Holidays took over the sponsorship and, as part of the agreement, the event moved to its current home at the company's resort in Hopton-on-Sea. The mixed pairs competition was added to the championship in 2004.

== Men's/Open singles champions ==
Year	Winner
1979	(England) David Bryant (1/3)
1980	(England) David Bryant (2/3)
1981	(England) David Bryant (3/3)
1982	(Scotland) John Watson
1983	(Scotland) Bob Sutherland
1984	(Northern Ireland) Jim Baker
1985	(Wales) Terry Sullivan
1986	(England) Tony Allcock (1/3)
1987	(England) Tony Allcock (2/3)
1988	(Scotland) Hugh Duff (1/2)
1989	(Scotland) Richard Corsie (1/3)
1990	(Wales) John Price
1991	(Scotland) Richard Corsie (2/3)
1992	(Australia) Ian Schuback
1993	(Scotland) Richard Corsie (3/3)
1994	(England) Andy Thomson (1/3)

Year	Winner
1995	(England) Andy Thomson (2/3)
1996	(Scotland) David Gourlay
1997	(Scotland) Hugh Duff (2/2)
1998	(Scotland) Paul Foster (1/5)
1999	(Scotland) Alex Marshall (1/6)
2000	(Wales) Robert Weale
2001	(Scotland) Paul Foster (2/5)
2002	(England) Tony Allcock (3/3)
2003	(Scotland) Alex Marshall (2/6)
2004	(Scotland) Alex Marshall (3/6)
2005	(Scotland) Paul Foster (3/5)
2006	(England) Mervyn King
2007	(Scotland) Alex Marshall (4/6)
2008	(Scotland) Alex Marshall (5/6)
2009	(England) Billy Jackson
2010	(England) Greg Harlow

Year	Winner
2011	(Scotland) Paul Foster (4/5)
2012	(England) Andy Thomson (3/3)
2013	(Scotland) Stewart Anderson (1/3)
2014	(Scotland) Darren Burnett
2015	(Scotland) Alex Marshall (6/6)
2016	(England) Nick Brett
2017	(Scotland) Paul Foster (5/5)
2018	(England) Mark Dawes (1/2)
2019	(Scotland) Stewart Anderson (2/3)
2020	(England) Robert Paxton (1/2)
2021	(England) Mark Dawes (2/2)
2022	(England) Les Gillett
2023	(England) Jamie Walker
2024	(Scotland) Stewart Anderson (3/3)
2025	(Scotland) Jason Banks
2026	(England) Robert Paxton (2/2)

Wins by individual (Open Singles only)

	Name	Titles	Runners up	Winning Years
(Scotland)	Alex Marshall	6	2	1999, 2003, 2004, 2007, 2008, 2015
(Scotland)	Paul Foster	5	3	1998, 2001, 2005, 2011, 2017
(Scotland)	Richard Corsie	3	4	1989, 1991, 1993
(England)	Andy Thomson	3	2	1994, 1995, 2012
(England)	David Bryant	3	1	1979, 1980, 1981
(Scotland)	Stewart Anderson	3	1	2013, 2019, 2024
(England)	Tony Allcock	3	-	1986, 1987, 2002
(England)	Robert Paxton	2	3	2020, 2026
(Scotland)	Hugh Duff	2	1	1988, 1997
(England)	Mark Dawes	2	-	2018, 2021
(Wales)	John Price	1	3	1990
(England)	Mervyn King	1	3	2006
(England)	Greg Harlow	1	3	2010
(Australia)	Ian Schuback	1	2	1992
(Northern Ireland)	Jim Baker	1	1	1984
(Scotland)	David Gourlay	1	1	1996
(Wales)	Robert Weale	1	1	2000
(England)	Nick Brett	1	1	2016
(Scotland)	Jason Banks	1	1	2025
(Scotland)	John Watson	1	-	1982
(Scotland)	Bob Sutherland	1	-	1983
(Wales)	Terry Sullivan	1	-	1985
(England)	Billy Jackson	1	-	2009
(Scotland)	Darren Burnett	1	-	2014
(England)	Les Gillett	1	-	2022
(England)	Jamie Walker	1	-	2023

Performance by country (Open singles only)

Country	Titles
Scotland	24
England	19
Wales	3
Australia	1
Northern Ireland	1
Total	48

== Women's singles champions ==
Year	Winner
1988	(Northern Ireland) Margaret Johnston
1990	(Guernsey) Fleur Bougourd
1991	(England) Mary Price
1992	(Scotland) Sarah Gourlay
1993	(Scotland) Kate Adams
1994	(Scotland) Jan Woodley
1995	(Scotland) Joyce Lindores
1996	(England) Sandy Hazell
1997	(England) Norma Shaw
1998	(Scotland) Caroline McAllister (1/2)
1999	(Scotland) Caroline McAllister (2/2)
2000	(New Zealand) Marlene Castle
2001	(Scotland) Betty Brown

Year	Winner
2002	(England) Carol Ashby (1/3)
2003	(England) Carol Ashby (2/3)
2004	(England) Carol Ashby (3/3)
2005	(England) Ellen Falkner (1/3)
2006	(England) Ellen Falkner (2/3)
2007	(Scotland) Caroline Brown
2008	(Australia) Ceri Ann Davies
2009	(England) Debbie Stavrou (1/2)
2010	(England) Debbie Stavrou (2/2)
2011	(Guernsey) Alison Merrien
2012	(Australia) Karen Murphy
2013	(England) Rebecca Field
2014	(England) Katherine Rednall (1/7)

Year	Winner
2015	(Wales) Laura Daniels (1/2)
2016	(England) Ellen Falkner (3/3)
2017	(England) Katherine Rednall (2/7)
2018	(England) Katherine Rednall (3/7)
2019	(Scotland) Julie Forrest (1/3)
2020	(Scotland) Julie Forrest (2/3)
2021	(Wales) Laura Daniels (2/2)
2022	(England) Katherine Rednall (4/7)
2023	(England) Katherine Rednall (5/7)
2024	(England) Katherine Rednall (6/7)
2025	(Scotland) Julie Forrest (3/3)
2026	(England) Katherine Rednall (7/7)

== Open pairs champions ==
The Open Pairs (formerly the Men's Open pairs) allows anyone to compete, this is not to be confused with the Mixed Pairs. It was a men's only competition until 2012.

Year	Winner
1986	(England) Tony Allcock (1/8) & David Bryant (1/6)
1987	(England) Tony Allcock (2/8) & David Bryant (2/6)
1988	(Australia) Ian Schuback (1/3) & Jim Yates
1989	(England) Tony Allcock (3/8) & David Bryant (3/6)
1990	(England) Tony Allcock (4/8) & David Bryant (4/6)
1991	(England) Tony Allcock (5/8) & David Bryant (5/6)
1992	(England) Tony Allcock (6/8) & David Bryant (6/6)
1993	(England) Gary Smith & Andy Thomson (1/3)
1994	(Australia) Ian Schuback (2/3) & Cameron Curtis
1995	(Scotland) Richard Corsie & Alex Marshall (1/7)
1996	(Australia) Ian Schuback (3/3) & Kelvin Kerkow (1/3)
1997	(England) Tony Allcock (7/8) & Mervyn King (1/3)
1998	(Scotland) Richard Corsie & Graham Robertson
1999	(Wales) John Price & Stephen Rees
2000	(Scotland) David Gourlay & Alex Marshall (2/7)
2001	(England) Les Gillett (1/2) & Mark McMahon
2002	(Scotland) Hugh Duff & Paul Foster (1/6)
2003	(England) Tony Allcock (8/8) & David Holt
2004	(Northern Ireland) Ian McClure & Jeremy Henry
2005	(Australia) Kelvin Kerkow (2/3) & (England) Mervyn King (2/3)
2006	(England) Billy Jackson (1/2) & (Australia) David Gourlay (1/2)

Year	Winner
2007	(England) Billy Jackson (2/2) & (Australia) David Gourlay (2/2)
2008	(England) Andy Thomson (2/3) & Ian Bond (1/2)
2009	(Australia) Kelvin Kerkow (3/3) & (England) Mervyn King (3/3)
2010	(England) Andy Thomson (3/3) & Ian Bond (2/2)
2011	(Scotland) Paul Foster (2/6) & Alex Marshall (3/7)
2012	(Scotland) Paul Foster (3/6) & Alex Marshall (4/7)
2013	(Scotland) Paul Foster (4/6) & Alex Marshall (5/7)
2014	(England) Greg Harlow (1/3) & Nick Brett (1/3)
2015	(England) Robert Paxton & Simon Skelton
2016	(Scotland) Stewart Anderson (1/3) & Darren Burnett (1/3)
2017	(England) Les Gillett (2/2) & (Wales) Jason Greenslade
2018	(England) Mark Dawes (1/2) & Jamie Chestney (1/2)
2019	(Scotland) Paul Foster (5/6) & Alex Marshall (6/7)
2020	(England) Greg Harlow (2/3) & Nick Brett (2/3)
2021	(England) Mark Dawes (2/2) & Jamie Chestney (2/2)
2022	(Scotland) Stewart Anderson (2/3) & Darren Burnett (2/3)
2023	(England) Greg Harlow (3/3) & Nick Brett (3/3)
2024	(Scotland) Stewart Anderson (3/3) & Darren Burnett (3/3)
2025	(Scotland) Jason Banks (1/1) & Michael Stepney (1/1)
2026	(Scotland) Paul Foster (6/6) & Alex Marshall (7/7)

== Mixed pairs champions ==
Year	Winner
2004	(Scotland) Alex Marshall (1/2) & (England) Amy Monkhouse
2005	(Wales) John Price (1/2) & (England) Carol Ashby (1/3)
2006	(Wales) John Price (2/2) & (England) Carol Ashby (2/3)
2007	(England) Greg Harlow & (England) Jo Morris
2008	(Australia) David Gourlay (1/3) & Ceri Ann Davies (1/3)
2009	(Australia) David Gourlay (2/3) & Ceri Ann Davies (2/3)
2010	(Scotland) Alex Marshall (2/2) & (England) Carol Ashby (3/3)
2011	(England) Simon Skelton & (Guernsey) Alison Merrien (1/2)
2012	(Scotland) David Gourlay (3/3) & (England) Debbie Stavrou
2013	(Scotland) Paul Foster (1/3) & (Wales) Laura Thomas (1/2)
2014	(Scotland) Paul Foster (2/3) & (Wales) Laura Thomas (2/2)
2015	(England) Robert Paxton (1/2) & (Wales) Marion Purcell (1/2)

Year	Winner
2016	(Scotland) Darren Burnett & (England) Katherine Rednall
2017	(England) Nick Brett (1/3) & (Scotland) Claire Johnston
2018	(England) Jamie Chestney & (Scotland) Lesley Doig
2019	(England) Robert Paxton (2/2) & (England) Ellen Falkner
2020	(England) Nick Brett (2/3) & (Wales) Marion Purcell (2/2)
2021	(Scotland) Stewart Anderson (1/2) & (Scotland) Julie Forrest (1/2)
2022	(Scotland) Paul Foster (3/3) & (Guernsey) Alison Merrien (2/2)
2023	(Scotland) Stewart Anderson (2/2) & (Wales) Ceri Ann Glen (3/3)
2024	(England) Nick Brett (3/3) & (Scotland) Julie Forrest (2/2)
2025	(Scotland) Jason Banks (1/1) & (Scotland) Beth Riva (1/1)
2026	(Northern Ireland) Chloe Wilson (1/1) & (England) Jamie Walker (1/1)

== Open under–25 champions ==
Year	Winner
2016	(Wales) Joseph Mower
2017	(Australia) Ellen Ryan
2018	(Northern Ireland) Chloe Watson

Year	Winner
2019	(Scotland) John Orr
2020	(England) William Moulton
2022	(Scotland) Daniel Pool (1/2)

Year	Winner
2023	(Scotland) Daniel Pool (2/2)
2024	(Scotland) Darren Weir

== Players with five or more titles ==
Name	Open singles	Women's singles	Open Pairs	Mixed Pairs	Total
(Scotland) Alex Marshall	6	N/A	7	2	15
(Scotland) Paul Foster	5	N/A	6	3	14
(England) Tony Allcock	3	N/A	8	-	11
(England) David Bryant	3	N/A	6	-	9
(Scotland) Stewart Anderson	3	N/A	3	2	8
(England) Katherine Rednall	-	7	-	1	8
(England) Nick Brett	1	N/A	3	3	7
(Scotland) / (Australia) David Gourlay	1	N/A	3	3	7
(England) Carol Ashby	-	3	-	3	6
(England) Andy Thomson	3	N/A	3	-	6
(Scotland) Darren Burnett	1	N/A	3	1	5
(Scotland) Richard Corsie	3	N/A	2	-	5
(England) Greg Harlow	1	N/A	3	1	5
(Scotland) Julie Forrest	-	3	-	2	5

== See also ==
- World lawn and indoor bowls events
