= Adjustable bed =

Type of bed which can be adjusted as needed

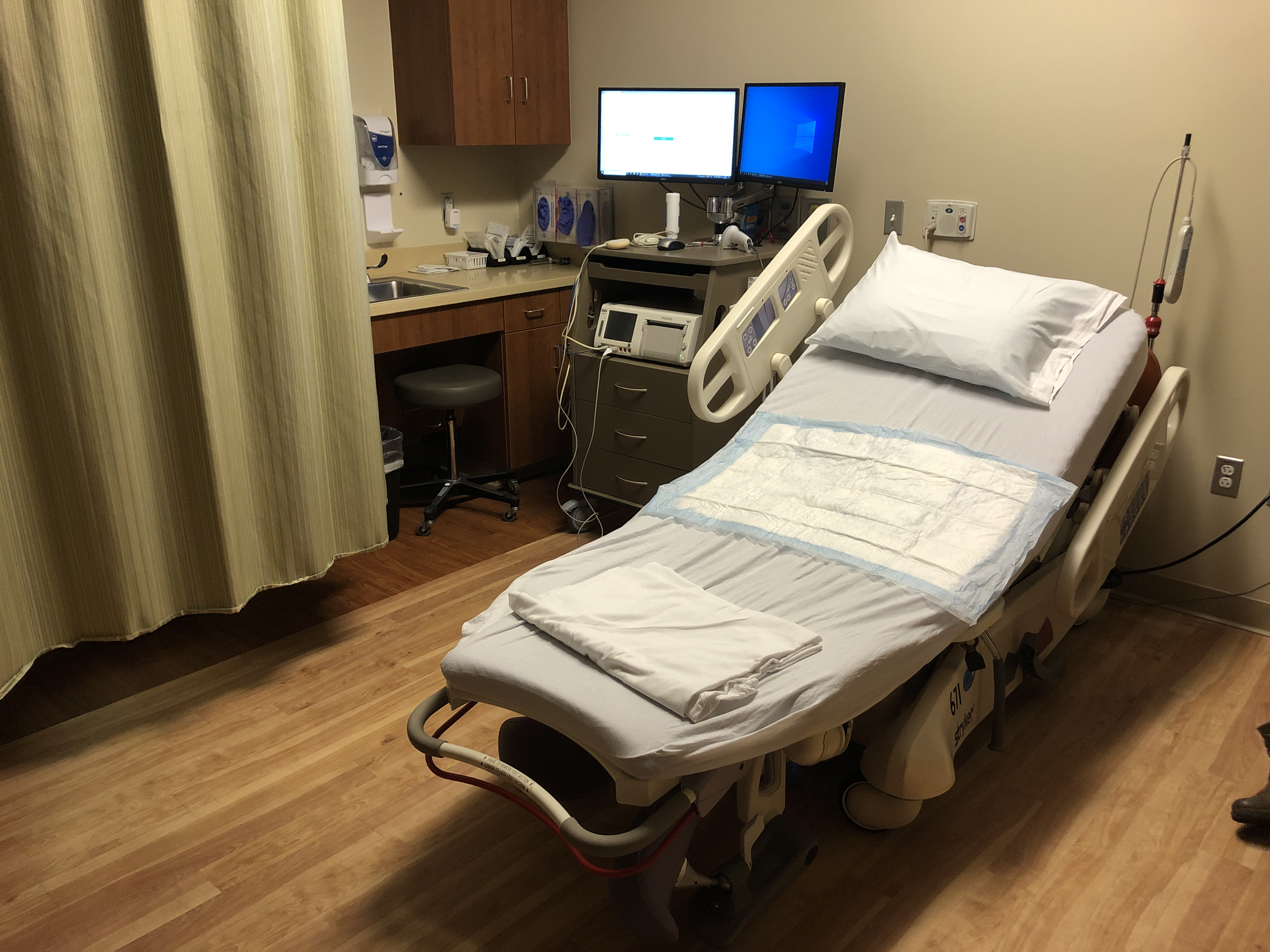
An adjustable bed in a hospital

An adjustable bed is a bed which has a multi-hinged lying surface which can be profiled to a number of different positions. Common adjustments include inclining the upper body and raising the lower body independently of each other. Other common features include height adjustment and tilting the bed to raise the upper body or the lower body into the Trendelenburg or reverse Trendelenburg positions.

The market for motorized adjustable bed bases is expanding, as the mattress industry has begun to heavily promote them to consumers as a comfort and lifestyle choice.

== Types and descriptions ==
Adjustable beds have been used in hospitals for a long time, but have become more commonly used in homecare over the past three decades, as they have been found to provide relief from various conditions. They can help provide a more comfortable sleep for those recovering from surgery, aiding circulation, breathing and swelling. Adjustable beds used in hospitals and homecare are similar in basic functionality. The four main options available in the homecare industry are: Standard – Standard profiling beds can be lowered to around 40cm and raised to around 80cm and have a maximum user weight capacity of at least 28 stone (180kg). Low – Similar to the standard profiling bed, however the low bed has a minimum platform height of 21cm. Ultra-Low – Designed for use without side rails this bed can be lowered to just 67mm from the floor so that if the user falls from the bed, the impact is minimized, especially when used in conjunction with a crash mat. Bariatric – These weight baring beds should have a weight capacity of no less than 45 stone (286kg) and be no less than 120cm wide. Hospital beds must be able to withstand more rigorous and regular cleaning in order to reduce contamination. Therefore, any electrical bed components used in the hospital environment need to meet minimum waterproofing standards in order to withstand the cleaning process. Homecare beds are less likely to be subjected to such intense cleaning, even if used within a care home, and this allows manufacturers to design beds whose aesthetics match home furnishings by using divan style beds or by using wooden veneer and laminates.

The basic and most popular structure is of a slatted base with a twin drive or a triple drive motor. The support of the mattress comes from the flexibility of the slats and their elastic mountings on the frame. The slatted bases are economic price-wise and can be lifted with lightweight actuators. The more advanced structure is the fully flexible base; it provides support to the mattress in every pressure point. They also require more powerful motors due to their weight. Fully flexible bases are usually made of zoned fillings of HR or of cold foam, sometimes covered with either latex or 3D mesh (spacer fabric) layer. The fully flexible bases are more solid and many would say more comfortable in providing a better support to the mattress.

Both slatted or fully flexible bases can consist of four joints (back/stable/leg/foot) or 5 joints (neck/back/stable/leg/foot), usually operated by twin drive motors that operate the back and leg joint, and the movement of the neck and foot joint is semi automatic (sometimes there are motors with three actuators - also for the neck, and even with four - one for every joint). Another structural difference is the sliding back mechanism (sometimes called wall hugger or wall climber) which allows to minimise the gap with the back wall when the bed is uplifted, keeps the bedside table within reach, and enables the partners using the bed (if split) to keep eye contact at all times. In the 90's the sliding back mechanism was found only in the elite luxury products but it is becoming more common with the popular models, even with those that use slatted bases.

The increasing popularity of motorised adjustable beds for homecare is also partly due to the benefits provided to the caretaker, by allowing him or her to work at a comfortable height and reduce the risk of back injuries. Height adjustment and raising the upper body also assists users in getting out of bed with little or no assistance dependent on their condition.

In Europe, all adjustable beds for use within healthcare must be CE marked and also be compliant with EN1970.
