= 2007 in bowls =

Year 2007 in bowls also includes events in the autumn of 2006, since they belong to the same bowls season.

== International championships ==
World Indoor Bowls Championships, Norfolk, England: 8–28 January
Discipline	Men	Women	Mixed
Singles	(Scotland) Alex Marshall	(Scotland) Caroline Brown	N/A
Pairs	(Australia) (England) David Gourlay & Billy Jackson	N/A	(England) Jo Morris & Greg Harlow

== World Bowls Tour ==
engage International Open 2006, Sheffield, England: 29 October – 5 November
Discipline	Winner	Runner-up
Men Singles	(England) Greg Harlow	(Australia) David Gourlay

Scottish International Open 2006, Perth, Scotland: 25 November – 2 December
Discipline	Winner	Runner-up
Men Singles	(Australia) Kelvin Kerkow	(Australia) David Gourlay

Welsh International Open 2007, Llanelli, Wales: 3–9 February
Discipline	Winner	Runner-up
Men Singles	(Scotland) Paul Foster	(Wales) Robert Weale

== Other international competitions ==
Australian Bowls Open, Thornbury, Australia: 18–24 February
Discipline	Men	Women	Mixed
Singles			
Pairs			
