= Ceri Ann Davies =

Welsh-Australian international lawn and indoor bowler and four-time World Champion

Personal information
- Nationality: Australian & British (Welsh)
- Born: 15 December 1978 (age 47) Sandfields, Port Talbot, Wales

Sport
- Sport: Bowls

Achievements and titles
- Highest world ranking: 40 (June 2024)
Medal record
Representing Australia
Commonwealth Games
| Silver medal – second place | 2006 Melbourne | Women's triples |
Asia Pacific Bowls Championships
| Bronze medal – third place | 2007 Christchurch | fours |
Representing Wales
World Indoor Bowls Championships
| Gold medal – first place | 2008 | women's singles |
| Gold medal – first place | 2008 | mixed pairs |
| Gold medal – first place | 2009 | mixed pairs |
| Gold medal – first place | 2023 | mixed pairs |

Ceri Ann Davies (born 15 December 1978), married name Ceri Ann Glen is an international lawn bowls player and four-time indoors World Champion.

== Bowls career ==
Davies made her debut for Wales aged just eleven. Davies competed for Wales from 1991 to 2004.

She moved to Australia where she was courted by their Talent Identification Programme. After switching allegiance to Australia she won a silver medal in the triples at the 2006 Commonwealth Games in Melbourne. Davies received her Australian Citizenship two days before the Games, after being awarded a 'distinguished talents' visa and awarded the 69th Ladies Cap for Australia. In addition to the 2006 Commonwealth Games, Davies competed for Australia in the Trans Tasman Championships against New Zealand, the Tri Series against New Zealand and Malaysia, Multi- Nations against South Africa & Scotland and the Asia Pacific Championships. She won a bronze medal at the 2007 Asia Pacific Bowls Championships in Christchurch. She won numerous state titles in Queensland, and skipped Queensland to the Australia Sides Championships in 2006 & 2007. Davies became the first female to compete in the inaugural Premier League, where she played third to Shane Globits to win the Premier League title for Paradise Point Bowls Club. She was a member of Helensvale Bowls Club and also had a professional contract with Mount Gravatt Bowls Club, all in Queensland.

In 2008, Davies qualified for the World Indoor Singles Championship, and in doing so became one of the few women to qualify for the Open Singles Event. Davies defeated Glenn Skipp of England and then Jamie Hill of New Zealand to reach the last 16 of the tournament before losing to four-time world champion, Alex Marshall on a tie break. Despite this defeat, Davies went on to win the women's singles, defeating Debbie Stavrou in the final, and the mixed pairs with David Gourlay.

One year later, at the 2009 World Indoor Bowls Championship with David Gourlay, they retained their mixed pairs title, with Davies 6-month pregnant with her first child. The following year, going for the treble, the pair were defeated in the final on a tie break.

In 2023, after a 13-year break, and just five month after returning to the sport, Davies qualified once again for the World Indoor Championships. Representing Wales, she won the 2023 World Indoor Bowls Championship mixed pairs final, with Stewart Anderson. She also reached the final of Ladies Matchplay Singles.

== Professional career ==
Ceri Ann Davies has worked as the Team GB programme manager for Olympic and Paralympic Archery for Great Britain.

Davies has supported a number of athletes with their wellbeing and performance, including Liam Pitchford, Great Britain's former number-1 table tennis player.

Davies also coached Pitchford's teammate, Paul Drinkhall. Together, their partnership also made history when Drinkhall became the first British player to win two World Tour titles, and Davies is believed to be the first female coach to coach a male table tennis player to a World Tour Title.

Davies now works in Risk & Performance in finance as an Executive Director of a High Performance Consultancy firm and is also an Independent Non-Executive Director on the Board of Bowls Wales. After losing her brother Gareth Davies to suicide she became a programme director for the Scottish Association for Mental Health.

== Personal life ==
She has cited her pride of being from a working class community and learning her sport alongside her family. She lives in Scotland with her husband and two children.
