= Bob Sutherland =

Personal information
- Nationality: Scotland
- Born: 21 May 1942
- Died: 30 March 1997 (aged 54)
Medal record
Representing (Scotland)
World Indoor Bowls Championships
| Gold medal – first place | 1983 Coatbridge | Men's singles |

Bob Sutherland (21 May 1942 – 30 March 1997) was a former Scottish lawn and indoor bowler. Sutherland was born on 21 May 1942 and was a member of the Bathgate outdoor bowls club and West Lothian indoor bowls club.

Sutherland was signed by Glasgow Rangers in 1959 and stayed with them until 1964 before moving to Stirling Albion F.C. A knee injury forced him to retire from football and he started bowling in 1968. He won the Scottish national indoor singles and British isles indoor singles in 1983; this was the same year in which he achieved his greatest success when winning the 1983 World Indoor Bowls Championship.

Sutherland died of cancer on 30 March 1997.
