= Jo Morris (bowls) =

Personal information
- Nationality: England

Sport
- Club: Egerton Park (Indoor)
Medal record
Representing England
World Indoor Bowls Championships
Gold medal – first place	2007 Yarmouth	Mixed pairs

Jo Morris is an English international lawn and indoor bowler.

In 2007, she won the mixed pairs title at the 2007 World Indoor Bowls Championship with Greg Harlow.
