= Hiren Bhartu =

Canadian bowls player

Personal information
- Nationality: Canadian
- Born: 14 May 1958 (age 68) Fiji
Medal record
Representing Canada
World Outdoor Championships
Bronze medal – third place	2008 Christchurch	Men's triples

Hirendra Bhartu (born May 14, 1958) is a Canadian professional indoor and lawn bowler from Suva, Fiji. He has won twenty nine Canadian national titles from 2005 to 2019 in Men's Singles and Mens Pairs as well as Mixed Pairs.14 titles with BCB competition and 15 titles with Professional Bowls Canada.

== Bowls career ==
Hirendra began his lawn bowling career at Nanaimo Lawn Bowling Club in 1995. In 2006, after honing his talent for indoor bowls at the Pacific Indoor Club in Vancouver, BC, he catapulted onto the international lawn bowling scene by soundly defeating his Canadian counterparts in all 4 of the Canadian PBA qualifiers in order to play in the World Bowls Tour. This accomplishment allowed him to compete with some of the finest lawn bowlers in the world in 4 prestigious events; the Scottish International Masters in Perth Scotland, Potters World Indoor Singles, and the Engage International Open,

Hirendra Represented Canada at the 2008 World Outdoor Bowls Championship held in Christchurch, NZ, winning a bronze medal.

Hirendra went on to represent Canada at the 2010 Commonwealth Games, Delhi as vice on the men's triples team. The team did not make the play-offs.

Hirendra is currently bowling as a member of Bowls BC out of the North Island Zone on Vancouver Island. In 2015 Hirendra won the BC Provincial Championship in Men's Pairs (4th win) and Mixed Pairs (5th win).

In 2022, he qualified to represent Canada at the 2022 World Bowls Indoor Championships. The event had been cancelled in 2020 and 2021 due to the COVID-19 pandemic.
