= Debbie Stavrou =

English international lawn and indoor bowler

Personal information
- Nationality: England
Medal record
Representing England
World Indoor Bowls Championships
Gold medal – first place	2009	Women's singles
Gold medal – first place	2010	Women's singles
Gold medal – first place	2012	Mixed pairs

Debbie Stavrou is an English international lawn and indoor bowler.

In 2009, she won the women's singles title at the 2009 World Indoor Bowls Championship defeating Alison Merrien in the final. The following year a second successive title came her way when she beat Alison Merrien once again in the 2010 World Indoor Bowls Championship. In 2012, she won the mixed pairs final with David Gourlay.
