= Carol Ashby =

English indoor bowls player

Personal information
- Nationality: England
- Citizenship: Australia
- Born: 1967 (age 58–59) Pembury, Kent
- Height: 169 cm (5 ft 7 in)

Sport
- Sport: Lawn bowls
- Partner: None
- Former partner: Graeme Archer
- Retired: From lawn bowls 2015
Medal record
Women's indoor bowls
Representing England
World Indoor Bowls Championships
Gold medal – first place	2002	Women's singles
Gold medal – first place	2003	Women's singles
Gold medal – first place	2004	Women's singles
Gold medal – first place	2005	Mixed pairs
Gold medal – first place	2006	Mixed pairs
Gold medal – first place	2010	Mixed pairs

Carol Ashby is a retired six times world indoor bowls champion from England but holds Australian citizenship.

== Bowls career ==
Ashby won the women's singles title at the 2002 World Indoor Bowls Championship, 2003 World Indoor Bowls Championship and 2004 World Indoor Bowls Championship. She gained as much press coverage for her image despite the fact that she was a three times world singles champion. In addition to the three singles titles she also won three mixed pairs titles in 2005, 2006 and 2010. The 2005 and 2006 wins were with John Price of Wales and during the 2010 championships she partnered Alex Marshall of Scotland.

In 2014, whilst living in Australia she married Scottish international bowler Graeme Archer and in 2015 retired from bowls. In 2016 her relationship with Archer ended when he returned to Scotland to live.
