= Jeremy Henry =

Personal information
- Full name: Jeremy Norman Henry
- Nationality: Northern Irish / Australian
- Born: 3 April 1974 (age 52) Northern Ireland

Sport
- Club: Warilla BC previously Portrush BC
Medal record
Representing Ireland
World Outdoor Championships
Gold medal – first place	1996 Adelaide	Men's pairs
Gold medal – first place	2000 Johannesburg	Men's singles
Bronze medal – third place	2004 Ayr	Men's team
British Isles Championships
Gold medal – first place	1997	singles
Gold medal – first place	1994	triples
Representing Northern Ireland
Commonwealth Games
Bronze medal – third place	1998 Kuala Lumpur	Men's singles
Silver medal – second place	2002 Manchester	Men's singles
Silver medal – second place	2006 Melbourne	Men's triples
World Indoor Championships
Gold medal – first place	2004	Men's pairs

Jeremy Norman Henry (born 3 April 1974) is a former Irish and current Australian lawn and indoor bowler born in Northern Ireland.

== Bowls career ==
=== Outdoor Bowls ===
Henry has achieved major success in the sport winning two gold medals in the World Outdoor Bowls Championship and three Commonwealth Games medals.

In 1996 he won the gold in the pairs with Sammy Allen at the 1996 World Outdoor Bowls Championship in Adelaide, Australia. Four years later he won a second gold at the 2000 World Outdoor Bowls Championship in the singles in Johannesburg, South Africa.

In the Commonwealth Games he won the bronze medal at the 1998 Commonwealth Games in the singles at Bukit Kiara, Kuala Lumpur in Malaysia and four years later won silver at the 2002 Commonwealth Games in Heaton Park, Manchester. Another silver medal in 2006 came in the triples event.

All of the medals were won representing a combined Ireland team or Northern Ireland (Commonwealth Games) before Henry emigrated to Australia where he resides and plays for Warilla and has been capped by Australia.

He has also won six outdoor Irish National Bowls Championships; the 1996 and 2001 singles, the 1990, 1994 and 2003 pairs titles and the 1993 triples title. He has also won the singles at the British Isles Bowls Championships in 1997. In 2006, he won the Hong Kong International Bowls Classic singles title.

=== Indoor bowls ===
He won a 2004 World Indoor Bowls Championship pairs title with Ian McClure and after emigrating most of his career has been revolved around indoor bowls. He has taken advantage of the fact that the World Cup Singles are held at his home club which had contributed in a record six title wins in 2012, 2013, 2014, 2016, 2017 and 2018.
