= David Gourlay (bowls) =

Scottish-Australian lawn & indoor bowler

David Gourlay MBE
Personal information
- Nickname: Goraz
- Nationality: Scottish
- Born: 22 April 1966 (age 60) Glasgow, Scotland

Sport
- Club: Prestwick B.C (indoor); Annbank BC, Crookston BC (outdoor)
Medal record
Representing Scotland & Australia
World Indoor Bowls Championships
Gold medal – first place	1996	Men's singles
Gold medal – first place	2000	Men's pairs
Gold medal – first place	2006	Men's pairs
Gold medal – first place	2007	Men's pairs
Gold medal – first place	2008	Mixed pairs
Gold medal – first place	2009	Mixed pairs
Gold medal – first place	2012	Mixed pairs

David Gourlay is a Scottish (and former Australian) international lawn & indoor bowler from the Prestwick Bowling Club and Crookston Bowling Club. He is also a Commonwealth Games medal winning coach.

== Bowls career ==
Gourlay, a Glaswegian, first took up the game aged 11 following the success of his father David Gourlay Sr. at the 1982 Commonwealth Games and his mother Sarah Gourlay at the 1985 World Outdoor Championships.

He has won 15 World Bowls Tour Titles with the highlight being the World Indoor Singles title in 1996. He represented Scotland at the 1998 Commonwealth Games in Kuala Lumpur.

He is related to the Scottish footballers James Gourlay and Jimmy Gourlay.

== Occupation & coaching ==
Following a spell in Australia from 2005-2009 where Gourlay played and coached in the outdoor and indoor game, he returned to Scotland and set up a bowls retail outlet business http://www.davidgourlaybowls.co.uk Bowls Scotland appointed Gourlay as their new head coach for the 2014 Glasgow Commonwealth Games. After a successful 2014 Commonwealth Games where Scotland won four medals Gourlay stepped down as the head coach.

He returned as head coach for the Scottish team for the 2018 Commonwealth Games on the Gold Coast in Queensland

In the 2018 Birthday Honours, Gourlay was appointed Member of the Order of the British Empire (MBE) for services to bowls.

== Achievements ==
Gourlay has won seven World Indoor Bowls titles -

- 1996 World Indoor Men's Singles Champion
- 2000 World Indoor Men's Pairs Champion with Alex Marshall
- 2006 World Indoor Men's Pairs Champion with Billy Jackson
- 2007 World Indoor Men's Pairs Champion with Billy Jackson
- 2008 World Indoor Mixed Pairs Champion with Ceri Ann Davies
- 2009 World Indoor Mixed Pairs Champion with Ceri Ann Davies
- 2012 World Indoor Mixed Pairs Champion with Debbie Stavrou

== Other achievements ==
- Represented Scotland Commonwealth Games, Malaysia 1998.
- Five times winner of the International Open - 1998, 2000, 2002, 2016, 2018
- Twice winner of the Scottish International Open - 2002, 2017
- Winner of the Welsh International Open - 2012
