= Kelvin Kerkow =

Australian bowls player

Personal information
- Full name: Kelvin Ivan Kerkow
- Nickname: Spike
- Nationality: Australian
- Born: 22 April 1969 (age 57) Kingaroy, Queensland, Australia
- Height: 1.75 m (5 ft 9 in) (2011)
- Weight: 75 kg (165 lb) (2011)

Sport
- Sport: Bowls
- Club: South Tweed Sports Club
Medal record
Bowls
Representing Australia
World Outdoor Championships
Bronze medal – third place	1996 Adelaide	singles
Bronze medal – third place	1996 Adelaide	triples
Silver medal – second place	2004 Ayr	fours
Commonwealth Games
Gold medal – first place	2006 Melbourne	singles
World Indoor Championships
Gold medal – first place	1996 Preston	pairs
Gold medal – first place	2005 Great Yarmouth	pairs
Gold medal – first place	2009 Great Yarmouth	pairs
Asia Pacific Bowls Championships
Gold medal – first place	1995 Dunedin	singles
Silver medal – second place	1995 Dunedin	triples
Silver medal – second place	1997 Warilla	singles
Gold medal – first place	2001 Melbourne	fours
Bronze medal – third place	2003 Brisbane	pairs
Gold medal – first place	2003 Brisbane	fours
Silver medal – second place	2005 Melbourne	pairs

Kelvin Kerkow OAM (born 22 April 1969) is an Australian lawn bowls and indoor bowls player and author.

== Early life ==
Kerkow was born in 1969 in Kingaroy, Queensland. At the age of seven, he contracted Guillain–Barré syndrome which led to him being unable to walk for several years. His parents, Ivan and Joan introduced him to bowls when he was unable to play contact sports due to his limited mobility.

== Bowls career ==
Outdoors he won two bronze medals in the singles and triples in the 1996 World Outdoor Bowls Championship and a silver medal in the fours at the 2004 World Outdoor Bowls Championship. He also secured the 2006 Commonwealth Games singles gold medal in Melbourne. He is also a three times title winner at the Asia Pacific Bowls Championships in 1995, 2001 and 2003.

Indoors Kelvin has won three World Indoor Championships Pairs gold medals. In the 1996 World Indoor Bowls Championship he partnered Ian Schuback, and in the 2005 World Indoor Bowls Championship and 2009 World Indoor Bowls Championship he partnered Mervyn King. In addition he has won the gold medal at the 2007 World Cup Singles in Warilla, New South Wales, Australia, the 2006 Scottish International Open and was twice winner of the Welsh International Open in 2004 and 2005.

== Other Achievements ==
- Australian Indoor Singles Winner
- Welsh Master Invitation champion 1997
- World Bowls Singles Bronze Medallist 1996
- Australian Representative 1995-2008
- Gold Coast Winter Carnival Singles 1995
- Hub of the Hunter invitation Singles 1994
- Welsh invitation Singles 1996
- Coolangatta Master of Masters 1993
- Golden Nugget invitation Singles 1994 &1997
- Halekulani invitation Singles 1995
- Mt Isla Invitation Singles 1999
- Halekulani Invitation Singles 1999

== Publications ==
In January 2009 Kerkow released his autobiography Rolled Gold in which he tells the story of his childhood battle with Guillain–Barré syndrome and how lawn bowls helped him overcome his disability with help from his friend Steve Glasson.

== Honours ==
In 2000, Kerkow was a recipient of the Australian Sports Medal. Kerkow received the Medal of the Order of Australia in 2010 for his services as a player, coach and mentor. In 2017, Kerkow was inducted as a Legend in the Bowls Australia Hall of Fame.
