= Ian Bond =

English bowler

Personal information
- Nationality: British (English)
- Born: 8 June 1973 (age 53)
Medal record
Representing England
Commonwealth Games
Silver medal – second place	2006	Men's pairs
World Indoor Bowls Championships
Gold medal – first place	2008	Men's pairs
Gold medal – first place	2010	Men's pairs

Ian John Bond (born 8 June 1973) is an English international lawn and indoor bowler.

== Career ==
Bond plays for the Exonia indoor bowls club and the Crediton outdoor bowls club.

He won the Pairs title at the 2008 World Indoor Bowls Championship and repeated the feat securing the 2010 World Indoor Bowls Championship whilst partnering Andy Thomson on both occasions. Also in 2010 he became the World Matchplay champion.

At the 2025 World Indoor Bowls Championship, Bond became the inaugural invitational Masters champion with a win over Billy Jackson in the final, after defeating Graham Robertson in the semi-finals.

Other achievements include winning the -
2001 BUPA Care Homes Open
2003 Scottish Masters
2005 Scottish International Open 2005
