= Billy Jackson (bowls) =

British lawn & indoor bowler

Personal information
- Nationality: British (English)
- Born: 2 March 1970 (age 56) Lincoln, England

Sport
- Club: Lincoln & District IBC; St. Giles, Lincoln
Medal record
Representing England
World Indoor Bowls Championships
Gold medal – first place	2006	Men's pairs
Gold medal – first place	2007	Men's pairs
Gold medal – first place	2009	Men's singles

William Jackson (born 1970, Lincolnshire) is an English international indoor and lawn bowler.

== Career ==
Jackson was the winner of the 2006 and 2007 World Indoor Pairs title (with David Gourlay) and the 2009 singles title at the World Indoor Bowls Championships. He also won the WBT Super Bowls title in 2014 at Blackpool Newton Hall. Since 1998 he has competed for England 54 times at indoor international level.

He has won the indoor National singles in 2003, pairs in 2001, triples in 2007 along with the mixed fours the same year and won the indoor British Isles singles in 2004 and the pairs in 2002. He is the only Lincolnshire indoor bowler to have won all 4 county titles not just only in the same season, but he won all 4 finals on the same day in an epic day which lasted for 17 hours.

He was honoured in 2009 by winning the Sportsman of the Year award at the Lincolnshire Sports Awards and also he received the City of Lincoln Civic Award from the Mayor.

Outdoors he finished runner-up in the Bowls England National Championships (men's triples) in 1997, bowling for St. Giles, Lincoln.

== Family ==
Billy was born to parents William and Hilary. He is married to Rachael and has two sons, Ryan (born 1996), and Benjamin (born 2003).
