= Mervyn King (bowls) =

English lawn bowler (born 1966)

Personal information
- Born: 4 January 1966 (age 60) King's Lynn, England

Sport
- Country: England
- Sport: Lawn bowls
- Club: Hunstanton
Medal record
Representing England
Men's Lawn bowls
Commonwealth Games
Silver medal – second place	2010 Delhi	Men's pairs
World Indoor Championships
Gold medal – first place	1997 Preston	Men's pairs
Gold medal – first place	2005 Yarmouth	Men's pairs
Gold medal – first place	2006 Yarmouth	Men's singles
Gold medal – first place	2009 Yarmouth	Men's pairs
World Outdoor Championships
Bronze medal – third place	2004 Ayr	Men's triples
Bronze medal – third place	2004 Ayr	Men's fours

Mervyn John King (born 4 January 1966, in King's Lynn) is an international lawn and indoor bowler from Fakenham.

== Bowls career ==
King was twice runner-up in national junior singles in 1988 and 1989.

King represented England at three Commonwealth Games, the 2002, 2006 and the 2010 Commonwealth Games where he won a silver medal, with Stuart Airey, in the men's pairs competition.

He has also won two bronze medals at the 2004 World Outdoor Bowls Championship in Ayr in the triples and fours events.

He is a leading player on the indoor circuit and has remained in the world's top sixteen since 2006 and has won the world singles indoor title in 2006 and is also three times world indoor pairs champion in 1997 with Tony Allcock and twice with Kelvin Kerkow in 2005 and 2009. Other major wins include 2009 World Matchplay and 2010 Scottish International Open.

== Personal life ==
He is a pest controller by trade and is married with three children and two step children.
