= Andy Thomson (bowls) =

British lawn bowler

Andy Thomson MBE
Personal information
- Nationality: Scottish / English
- Born: 26 November 1955 (age 70) Fife, Scotland

Sport
- Club: Bromley (indoor); Blackheath & Greenwich (outdoor)
Medal record
Representing England
World Outdoor Championships
Silver medal – second place	1992 Worthing	team
Gold medal – first place	1996	Men's fours
Bronze medal – third place	2004	Men's triples
Bronze medal – third place	2004	Men's fours
World Indoor Bowls Championships
Gold medal – first place	1993	Men's pairs
Gold medal – first place	1994	Men's singles
Gold medal – first place	1995	Men's singles
Gold medal – first place	2008	Men's pairs
Gold medal – first place	2010	Men's pairs
Gold medal – first place	2012	Men's singles
Commonwealth Games
Bronze medal – third place	1994 Victoria	Men's pairs
British Isles Championships
Gold medal – first place	1993	pairs

Andrew Edward Thomson is a British former international lawn and indoor bowler. Known as Andy Thomson he was born in Fife, Scotland, on 26 November 1955, and represented Scotland before deciding to represent England.

== Bowls career ==
Thomson won the Buckhaven Club Championship at the age of 16 and one year later was the Fife under-30 champion. In 1978 he won the Scottish junior indoor title. After moving to Kent he claimed the 1981 EBA national singles.

In 1981, he defeated Alan Windsor in the English national singles.

He represented England at the 1986 Commonwealth Games in the singles, at the 1986 Commonwealth Games in Edinburgh, Scotland. Eight years later he partnered Gary Smith in the pairs and they won a bronze medal at the 1994 Commonwealth Games.

In 1993 he partnered Gary Smith as the pair won the World Indoor Bowls Championships pairs title. He had won the 1992 national pairs with Smith the year before. Then in successive seasons he won the 1994 and 1995 World Indoor Bowls Championships men's singles title. In 1996 he was part of the men's fours who won the World Championships in Adelaide, Australia.

In 2008 & 2010 he won the pairs title with Ian Bond and also became World Matchplay champion in 2008. At the WBT 2010 Awards Dinner he was awarded the 'Lifetime Achievement' Award as well as picking up his third World Indoor Pairs title.

In 2012 Andy Thomson won his third World Indoor Singles title, 17 years after his previous success. Three years later he reached the final once more, but was defeated by Alex Marshall.

Thomson spoke out against the new timing clock introduced for the 2013 World Indoor Championships.

He was appointed Member of the Order of the British Empire (MBE) in the 2013 New Year Honours for services to bowls.

In September 2018 Thomson retired from the England indoor team after reaching 114 caps. He later announced his full retirement following his wildcard participation in the 2021 World Indoor Bowls Championship.

== Coaching ==
Thomson is a tactical coach for Bowls Australia and is part of the coaching team for the 2022 Commonwealth Games.
