= Robert Weale =

Welsh bowls player (born 1963)

Personal information
- Nationality: British (Welsh)
- Born: 3 April 1963 (age 63) Hereford, Herefordshire, England
- Education: John Beddoes School

Sport
- Club: Presteigne BC
Medal record
Representing Wales
Commonwealth Games
Gold medal – first place	1986 Edinburgh	Men's fours
Silver medal – second place	1998 Kuala Lumpur	Men's pairs
Silver medal – second place	1994 Victoria	Men's pairs
Bronze medal – third place	2002 Manchester	Men's singles
Silver medal – second place	2006 Melbourne	Men's singles
Gold medal – first place	2010 Delhi	Men's singles
World Outdoor Championships
Bronze medal – third place	1988 Auckland	Men's pairs
Bronze medal – third place	1996 Adelaide	Men's pairs
Silver medal – second place	1996 Adelaide	Men's fours
Gold medal – first place	2000 Johannesburg	Men's fours
Bronze medal – third place	2004 Ayr	Men's pairs
World Indoor Bowls Championships
Gold medal – first place	2000 Yarmouth	Singles
Atlantic Bowls Championships
Gold medal – first place	2009 Johannesburg	pairs
Bronze medal – third place	2009 Johannesburg	fours
Silver medal – second place	2015 Paphos	triples
British Isles Championships
Gold medal – first place	1993	fours
Gold medal – first place	1997	fours
Gold medal – first place	2001	singles
Gold medal – first place	2011	fours
Gold medal – first place	2017	fours

Robert Arthur Weale (born in Hereford on 3 April 1963), is a Welsh international lawn and indoor bowls player. Weale is originally from Presteigne and was educated at John Beddoes School, but now lives in Hereford. In 2022, he was inducted into the Welsh Sports Hall of fame. In 2025, he was inducted into the Inaugural World Bowls Hall of Fame.

== Bowls career ==
Weale made his international debut in 1982. He was the youngest competitor in the 1984 World Outdoor Bowls Championship in Aberdeen, where he competed in the triples and fours events.

=== World Titles ===
Weale's career-best performance came in January 2000, when he won the 2000 World Indoor Bowls Championship singles title at Potters. Just a few months later, Weale won the men's fours title at the 2000 World Outdoor Bowls Championship, in Johannesburg in April 2000.

1988 Auckland
bronze medal in the men's pairs
1996 Adelaide
bronze medal in the men's pairs & silver medal in the men's fours
2000 Johannesburg
gold medal in the men's fours
2004 Ayr
bronze medal in the men's pairs

=== Commonwealth Games ===
Weale has won six Commonwealth Games medals achieved from eight successive games, a record. The achievement of winning medals over eight games is a record for a lawn bowls player and equals the record for a competitor across all sports. Weale was given the honour of carrying the Welsh flag & led the Welsh team out at the 1998 opening ceremony and he carried the Welsh flag during the 2010 closing ceremony.

1986 Commonwealth Games in Edinburgh
Gold Medal in the men's fours; with Jim Morgan, Hafod Thomas, and Will Thomas
1994 Commonwealth Games in Victoria
silver medal in the men's pairs; with John Price
1998 Commonwealth Games in Kuala Lumpur
silver medal in the men's pairs; with Will Thomas
2002 Commonwealth Games in Manchester
bronze medal in the men's singles
2006 Commonwealth Games in Melbourne
silver medal in the men's singles
2010 Commonwealth Games in Delhi
gold medal in the men's singles. Weale defeated Australian, Leif Selby

=== Welsh Titles ===
Weale won his first Welsh National Bowls Championships singles in 2000 and subsequently won the singles at the British Isles Bowls Championships in 2001. He won his second Welsh singles title in 2005 before winning a third in August 2012, defeating Paul Taylor of Bridgend 21-11. He also skipped the Weale family quartet to the Welsh outdoor fours title, on eight occasions. The Weale bowling family includes his three brothers (all former national champions) Brian, David and Stuart, sister-in-law Joanna Weale and daughter Rhiannon.

He has also won the Welsh Indoor singles on three occasions. In August 2005, he created a record by becoming the only man to hold both titles simultaneously.
