= Jonny Ross =

Northern Irish bowler (born 1973)

Jonathan Ross
Personal information
- Nationality: Northern Irish
- Born: 28 December 1973 (age 52)

Sport
- Club: (indoor) West of Scotland (outdoor) Priorscroft
Medal record
Representing Ireland
World Outdoor Championships
| Gold medal – first place | 2004 Ayr | Men's fours |
| Bronze medal – third place | 2004 Ayr | Men's team |

Jonathan Stewart Ross is a Northern Irish bowler who was born in Lisburn. He now represents Scotland after moving there.

== Bowls career ==
He was part of the winning Irish Fours team in the 2004 World Bowls Championships held in Ayr, Scotland with Jim Baker, Neil Booth and Noel Graham.

He also won the British Isles Singles titles in 2001 and 2002 and was the first Irish player to win the Scottish outdoors singles title.

Jonathan partnered Noel Graham to win the prestigious Hong Kong International Bowls Classic pairs title on a record equalling three occasions.

In 2006, he represented Northern Ireland at the Commonwealth Games in Melbourne, Australia.

He won the 2010 singles title at the Scottish National Bowls Championships bowling for the Priorscroft Bowls Club.
