= List of Commonwealth Games medallists in lawn bowls =

This is the complete list of Commonwealth Games medallists in lawn bowls from 1930 to 2022.

== Men's events ==
=== Singles ===
Games	Gold	Silver	Bronze
1930	Robert Colquhoun; England	James Thoms; South Africa	William Fielding; New Zealand
1934	Robert Sprot; Scotland	William McDonald; Canada	Charles Abbott; South Africa
1938	Horace Harvey; South Africa	Frank Livingstone; New Zealand	Jack Low; Australia
1950	James Pirret; New Zealand	Albert Newton; Australia	Lionel Garnett; Fiji
1954	Ralph Hodges; Southern Rhodesia	James Pirret; New Zealand	Arthur Saunders; South Africa
1958	Pinky Danilowitz; South Africa	Percy Baker; England	(Federation of Rhodesia and Nyasaland) Bill Jackson (CAF)
1962	David Bryant; England	Joseph Black; Scotland	Alan Bradley; Rhodesia and Nyasaland
1970	David Bryant; England	Neal Bryce; Zambia	Roy Fulton; Northern Ireland
1974	(England) David Bryant	(Australia) Clive White	(Scotland) Willie Wood
1978	David Bryant; England	John Snell; Australia	John Russell Evans; Wales
1982	Willie Wood; Scotland	Rob Parrella; Australia	Peter Belliss; New Zealand
1986	Ian Dickison; New Zealand	Ian Schuback; Australia	Richard Corsie; Scotland
1990	Rob Parrella; Australia	Mark McMahon; Hong Kong	Richard Corsie; Scotland
1994	Richard Corsie; Scotland	Tony Allcock; England	Rob Parrella; Australia; Ken Wallis; Hong Kong
1998	Roy Garden; Zimbabwe	John Price; Wales	Gerry Baker; South Africa; Jeremy Henry; Northern Ireland
2002	Bobby Donnelly; South Africa	Jeremy Henry; Northern Ireland	Mike Kernaghan; New Zealand
2002	Bobby Donnelly; South Africa	Jeremy Henry; Northern Ireland	Robert Weale; Wales
2006	Kelvin Kerkow; Australia	Robert Weale; Wales	Ryan Bester; Canada
2010	Robert Weale; Wales	Leif Selby; Australia	Gary Kelly; Northern Ireland
2014	Darren Burnett; Scotland	Ryan Bester; Canada	Aron Sherriff; Australia
2018	Aaron Wilson; Australia	Ryan Bester; Canada	Robert Paxton; England
2022	Aaron Wilson; Australia	Gary Kelly; Northern Ireland	Iain McLean; Scotland

=== Pairs ===
Games	Gold	Silver	Bronze
1930	England; Tommy Hills; George Wright	New Zealand; William Fielding; Peter McWhannell	Canada (CAN); Wilt Moore; Arthur Reid
1934	England; Tommy Hills; George Wright	Canada (CAN); William Hutchinson; Alfred Langford	Wales; Thomas Davies; Stan Weaver
1938	New Zealand; Walter Denison; Lance Macey	Australia; Percy Hutton; Howard Mildren	South Africa (SAF); D.A. Adamson; J.R. Appleford
1950	New Zealand; Phil Exelby; Robert Henry	South Africa (SAF); W. Gibb; H. J. van Zyl	Fiji; Leslie Brown; James Poulton
1954	Northern Ireland; William Rosbotham; Percy Watson	Canada (CAN); Sam Gardiner; Dick Williams	Scotland; George Budge; John Carswell
1958	New Zealand; John Morris; Ted Pilkington	South Africa (SAF); John Myrdal; Rudolph van Vuuren	Southern Rhodesia; Hector Philp; William Yuill
1962	New Zealand; Bob McDonald; Robbie Robson	Scotland; Thomas Hamill; Michael Purdon	Rhodesia and Nyasaland; Charles Bradley; Bill Jackson
1970	England; Norman King; Peter Line	New Zealand; Bob McDonald; Robbie Robson	Northern Ireland; Jimmy Donnelly; Syd Thompson
1974	(Scotland) Jack Christie; Alex McIntosh	(England) John Evans; Peter Line	(New Zealand) Bob McDonald; Phil Skoglund
1978	Hong Kong (HKG); Saco Delgado; Eric Liddell	Scotland; Alex McIntosh; Willie Wood	Wales; Jim Morgan; Ray Williams
1982	Scotland; David Gourlay Sr. John Watson	Wales; Lyn Perkins; Spencer Wilshire	Australia; Denis Dalton; Peter Rheuben
1986	Scotland; George Adrain; Grant Knox	Canada; Bill Boettger; Ronnie Jones	England; Chris Ward; David Ward
1990	Australia; Trevor Morris; Ian Schuback	Canada; George Boxwell; Alf Wallace	New Zealand; Rowan Brassey; Maurice Symes
1994	Australia; Cameron Curtis; Rex Johnston	Wales; John Price; Robert Weale	England; Gary Smith; Andy Thomson; Northern Ireland; Stephen Adamson; Sammy Allen
1998	Australia; Brett Duprez; Mark Jacobsen	Wales; Will Thomas; Robert Weale	Malaysia; Mohamed Aziz Maswadi; Mohamed Tazman Tahir; South Africa; Theuns Fraser; Rudi Jacobs
2002	Scotland; Alex Marshall; George Sneddon	England; Stephen Farish; Dean Morgan	Malaysia; Mohamed Aziz Maswadi; Safuan Said
2002	Scotland; Alex Marshall; George Sneddon	England; Stephen Farish; Dean Morgan	South Africa; Shaun Addinall; Gerry Baker
2006	Scotland Alex Marshall; Paul Foster	England Ian Bond; Mark Bantock	Australia Barrie Lester; Nathan Rice
2010	South Africa Shaun Addinall; Gerry Baker	England Stuart Airey; Merv King	Malaysia Khairul Annuar Abdul Kadir; Fairul Izwan Abd Muin
2014	Scotland; Paul Foster; Alex Marshall	Malaysia; Muhammad Hizlee Abdul Rais; Fairul Izwan Abd Muin	England; Andrew Knapper; Sam Tolchard
2018	Wales; Daniel Salmon; Marc Wyatt	Scotland; Paul Foster; Alex Marshall	Cook Islands; Taiki Paniani; Aidan Zittersteijn
2022	Wales; Daniel Salmon; Jarrad Breen	England; Jamie Walker; Sam Tolchard	Scotland; Paul Foster; Alex Marshall

=== Triples ===
Games	Gold	Silver	Bronze
2006	Australia Bill Cornehls; Mark Casey; Wayne Turley	Northern Ireland Jeremy Henry; Mark McPeak; Neil Booth	South Africa Eric Johannes; Gidion Vermeulen; Neil Burkett
2010	South Africa Johann Pierre du Plessis; Wayne Perry; Gidion Vermeulen	Australia Mark Casey; Wayne Turley; Brett Wilkie	England Mark Bantock; Rob Newman; Graham Shadwell
2014	South Africa; Prince Neluonde; Petrus Breitenbach; Bobby Donnelly	Northern Ireland; Paul Daly; Neil Mulholland; Neil Booth	Wales; Paul Taylor; Jonathan Tomlinson; Marc Wyatt
2018	Scotland; Darren Burnett; Derek Oliver; Ronnie Duncan	Australia; Aron Sherriff; Barrie Lester; Nathan Rice	Norfolk Island; Hadyn Evans; Phillip Jones; Ryan Dixon
2022	England; Louis Ridout; Nick Brett; Jamie Chestney	Australia; Barrie Lester; Carl Healey; Ben Twist	Wales; Owain Dando; Ross Owen; Jonathan Tomlinson

=== Fours ===
Games	Gold	Silver	Bronze
1930	England; Ernie Gudgeon; James Edney; James Frith; Albert Hough	Canada (CAN); Harry Allen; Jimmy Campbell; Mitch Thomas; Billy Rae	Scotland; David Fraser; John Orr; Tom Chambers (*); William Campbell
1934	England; Fred Biggin; Ernie Gudgeon; Percy Tomlinson; Robert Slater	Northern Ireland; Percy Watson; Charlie Clawson; George Watson; Cecil Curran	Scotland; William Lowe; Charles Tait; James Morrison; James Brown
1938	New Zealand; Alec Robertson; Ernie Jury; Bill Bremner; Bill Whittaker	South Africa (SAF); F. Stevenson; J. G. Donaldson; Norman Snowy Walker; T. H. Samson	Australia; Aub Murray; Charlie McNeill; Harold Murray; Tom Kinder
1950	South Africa (SAF); Alfred Blumberg; Herbert Currer; Harry Atkinson; Norman Snowy Walker	Australia; Charles Cordaiy; James Cobley; John Cobley; Len Knight	New Zealand; Fred Russell; Arthur Engebretsen; Noel Jolly; Pete Skoglund
1954	South Africa (SAF); Frank Mitchell; George Wilson; John Anderson; Wilfred Randall	Hong Kong (HGK); Alfred Coates; Jose da Luz; Raoul da Luz; Robert Gourlay	Southern Rhodesia (SRH); Alan Bradley; Alex Pascoe; Fred Hockin; Ronnie Turner
1958	England; Norman King; John Bettles; Walter Phillips; John Scadgell	South Africa (SAF); Wilfred Randall; Edward Stuart; Edward Williams; Norman Snowy Walker	Northern Rhodesia (NRH); Alex Pascoe; Charles Bradley; Basil Wells; Ronnie Turner
1962	England; David Bryant; Les Watson; Sydney Drysdale; Tom Fleming	Scotland; Michael Purdon; Thomas Hamill; Joseph Black; William Moore	Rhodesia and Nyasaland (RHO); John Milligan; Malcolm Bibb; Ronnie Turner; Victor Blyth
1970	Hong Kong (HKG); Abdul Kitchell; Saco Delgado; George Souza Sr. Roberto da Silva	Scotland; Alex McIntosh; David Pearson; John Slight; Norman Pryde	Northern Ireland; Edward Gordon; Harold Stevenson; John Higgins; William Tate
1974	New Zealand; David Baldwin; Kerry Clark; Gordon Jolly; John Somerville	Australia; Errol Bungey; Errol Stewart; Keith Poole; Robert King	Scotland; John Marshall; John McRae; Morgan Moffat; Bill Scott
1978	Hong Kong (HGK); Philip Chok; M. B. Hassan Jr. Omar Dallah; Roberto da Silva	New Zealand; David Baldwin; Morgan Moffat; John Malcolm; Phil Skoglund	Wales; Ellis Stanbury; Gwyn Evans; Ian Sutherland; John Thomson
1982	Australia; Rob Dobbins; Keith Poole; Bert Sharp; Don Sherman	New Zealand; Rowan Brassey; Morgan Moffat; Danny O'Connor; Jim Scott	Northern Ireland; Sammy Allen; Frank Campbell; Willie Watson; John McCloughlin
1986	Wales; Hafod Thomas; Jim Morgan; Robert Weale; Will Thomas	Canada; Dan Milligan; Dave Brown; Dave Houtby; Dave Duncalf	Northern Ireland; Billie Montgomery; Ernie Parkinson; Roy McCune; Willie Watson
1990	Scotland; Denis Love; George Adrain; Ian Bruce; Willie Wood	Northern Ireland; Jim Baker; John McCloughlin; Rodney McCutcheon; Sammy Allen	New Zealand; Kevin Darling; Peter Shaw; Phil Skoglund; Stewart McConnell
1994	South Africa; Alan Lofthouse; Donald Piketh; Neil Burkett; Robert Rayfield	Australia; Ian Taylor; Robert Ball; Stephen Anderson; Steve Srhoy	New Zealand; Bruce McNish; Peter Belliss; Rowan Brassey; Stewart Buttar
1994	South Africa; Alan Lofthouse; Donald Piketh; Neil Burkett; Robert Rayfield	Australia; Ian Taylor; Robert Ball; Stephen Anderson; Steve Srhoy	Northern Ireland; Ian McClure; John McCloughlin; Noel Graham; Victor Dallas
1998	Northern Ireland; Gary McCloy; Ian McClure; Martin McHugh; Neil Booth	Australia; Adam Jeffery; Kevin Walsh; Rex Johnston; Stewart Davies	South Africa; Bruce Makkink; Mike Redshaw; Neil Burkett; Robert Rayfield
1998	Northern Ireland; Gary McCloy; Ian McClure; Martin McHugh; Neil Booth	Australia; Adam Jeffery; Kevin Walsh; Rex Johnston; Stewart Davies	Wales; Dai Wilkins; Ian Slade; Mark Anstey; Neil Rees
2002	England; David Holt; John Ottaway; Robert Newman; Simon Skelton	South Africa; Duanne Abrahams; Kevin Campbell; Neil Burkett; Theuns Fraser	Northern Ireland; Jim Baker; Michael Nutt; Neil Booth; Noel Graham
2002	England; David Holt; John Ottaway; Robert Newman; Simon Skelton	South Africa; Duanne Abrahams; Kevin Campbell; Neil Burkett; Theuns Fraser	Wales; Dai Wilkins; Ian Slade; Jason Greenslade; Richard Bowen
2014	Scotland; David Peacock; Neil Speirs; Paul Foster; Alex Marshall	England; John McGuinness; Andrew Knapper; Stuart Airey; Jamie Chestney	Australia; Wayne Ruediger; Brett Wilkie; Nathan Rice; Matt Flapper
2018	Scotland; Alex Marshall; Paul Foster; Derek Oliver; Ronnie Duncan	Australia; Aron Sherriff; Barrie Lester; Nathan Rice; Brett Wilkie	England; David Bolt; Jamie Chestney; Sam Tolchard; Louis Ridout
2022	Northern Ireland; Sam Barkley; Adam McKeown; Ian McClure; Martin McHugh	India; Sunil Bahadur; Navneet Singh; Chandan Kumar Singh; Dinesh Kumar	England; Louis Ridout; Nick Brett; Jamie Chestney; Sam Tolchard

== Women's events ==
=== Singles ===
Games	Gold	Silver	Bronze
1986	Wendy Line; England	Senga McCrone; Scotland	Babs Anderson; Botswana
1990	Geua Vada Tau; Papua New Guinea	Millie Khan; New Zealand	Margaret Johnston; Northern Ireland
1994	Margaret Johnston; Northern Ireland	Rita Jones; Wales	Carmen Anderson; Norfolk Island; Norma Shaw; England
1998	Lesley Hartwell; South Africa	Saedah Abdul Rahim; Malaysia	Jean Baker; England; Millie Khan; New Zealand
2002	Siti Zalina Ahmad; Malaysia	Karen Murphy; Australia	Marlene Castle; New Zealand
2002	Siti Zalina Ahmad; Malaysia	Karen Murphy; Australia	Lorna Trigwell; South Africa
2006	Siti Zalina Ahmad; Malaysia	Betty Morgan; Wales	Lorna Trigwell; South Africa
2010	Natalie Melmore; England	Val Smith; New Zealand	Kelsey Cottrell; Australia
2014	Jo Edwards; New Zealand	Natalie Melmore; England	Colleen Piketh; South Africa
2018	Jo Edwards; New Zealand	Laura Daniels; Wales	Colleen Piketh; South Africa
2022	Ellen Ryan; Australia	Lucy Beere; Guernsey	Siti Zalina Ahmad; Malaysia

=== Pairs ===
Games	Gold	Silver	Bronze
1986	Northern Ireland; Freda Elliott; Margaret Johnston	Guernsey; Jenny Nicolle; Marie Smith	England; Betty Stubbings; Jean Valls
1990	New Zealand; Judy Howat; Marie Watson	Australia; Edda Bonutto; Maureen Hobbs	England; Mary Price; Jayne Roylance
1994	Scotland; Sarah Gourlay; Frances Whyte	South Africa; Lyn Dwyer; Jo Peacock	England; Brenda Atherton; Mary Price
1994	Scotland; Sarah Gourlay; Frances Whyte	South Africa; Lyn Dwyer; Jo Peacock	Wales; Janet Ackland; Ann Dainton
1998	Scotland; Margaret Letham; Joyce Lindores	Namibia; Cathelean du Plessis; Lynne Lindsay-Payne	Australia; Gordana Baric; Willow Fong
1998	Scotland; Margaret Letham; Joyce Lindores	Namibia; Cathelean du Plessis; Lynne Lindsay-Payne	Wales; Rita Jones; Ann Sutherland
2002	New Zealand; Jo Edwards; Sharon Sims	South Africa; Ellen Cawker; Jill Hackland	England; Amy Gowshall; Lynne Whitehead
2002	New Zealand; Jo Edwards; Sharon Sims	South Africa; Ellen Cawker; Jill Hackland	Wales; Anwen Butten; Joanna Weale
2006	Australia Karen Murphy; Lynsey Armitage	Scotland Joyce Lindores; Kay Moran	New Zealand Jan Khan; Marina Khan
2010	England Ellen Falkner; Amy Monkhouse	Malaysia Nor Hashimah Ismail; Zuraini Khalid	Wales Anwen Butten; Hannah Smith
2014	South Africa; Tracy-Lee Botha; Colleen Piketh	England; Jamie-Lea Winch; Natalie Melmore	Northern Ireland; Mandy Cunningham; Barbara Cameron
2018	Malaysia; Emma Firyana; Siti Zalina	South Africa; Colleen Piketh; Nicolene Neal	Scotland; Claire Johnston; Lesley Doig
2022	Australia; Kristina Krstic; Ellen Ryan	England; Amy Pharaoh; Sophie Tolchard	New Zealand; Katelyn Inch; Selina Goddard

=== Triples ===
Games	Gold	Silver	Bronze
1982	Zimbabwe Anna Bates; Flo Kennedy; Margaret Mills	New Zealand Pearl Dymond; Joyce Osborne; Jennie Simpson	England Norma Shaw; Mavis Steele; Betty Stubbings
2006	Malaysia Azlina Arshad; Nor Hashimah Ismail; Nor Iryani Azmi	Australia Ceri Ann Davies; Noi Tucker; Roma Dunn	England Amy Monkhouse; Jean Baker; Sue Harriott
2010	South Africa Tracy-Lee Botha; Susan Nel; Santjie Steyn	Australia Claire Duke; Julie Keegan; Sharyn Renshaw	England Sian Gordon; Sandy Hazell; Jamie-Lea Winch
2014	England; Sophie Tolchard; Ellen Falkner; Sian Gordon	Australia; Lynsey Clarke; Karen Murphy; Kelsey Cottrell	South Africa; Esme Steyn; Santjie Steyn; Susan Nel
2018	Australia; Carla Krizanic; Natasha Scott; Rebecca Van Asch	Scotland; Caroline Brown; Kay Moran; Stacey McDougall	England; Ellen Falkner; Katherine Rednall; Sian Honnor
2022	England; Jamie-Lea Winch; Natalie Chestney; Sian Honnor	Malaysia; Nur Ain Nabilah Tarmizi; Syafiqa Haidar Afif Abdul Rahman; Azlina Arshad	New Zealand; Nicole Toomey; Tayla Bruce; Val Smith

=== Fours ===
Games	Gold	Silver	Bronze
1986	Wales; Linda Parker; Linda Evans; Joan Ricketts; Rita Jones	Australia; Audrey Hefford; Betty Schenke; Clarice Power; Patricia Smith	England; Barbara Fuller; Brenda Atherton; Madge Allan; Mary Price
1990	Australia; Audrey Rutherford; Daphne Shaw; Dorothy Roche; Marion Stevens	New Zealand; Adrienne Lambert; Lyn McLean; Marlene Castle; Rhoda Ryan	Hong Kong; Jenny Wallis; Naty Rozario; Angela Chau; Yee Lai Lee
1994	South Africa; Anna Pretorius; Colleen Grondein; Hester Bekker; Lorna Trigwell	Papua New Guinea; Cunera Monalua; Elizabeth Bure; Linda Ahmat; Wena Piande	New Zealand; Adrienne Lambert; Ann Muir; Colleen Ferrick; Marlene Castle; Scotland; Dorothy Barr; Elizabeth Dickson; Betty Forsyth; Janice Maxwell
1998	South Africa; Hester Bekker; Loraine Victor; Lorna Trigwell; Trish Steyn	Australia; Lee Poletti; Karen Murphy; Margaret Sumner; Marilyn Peddell	England; Catherine Anton; Mandy Jacklin; Norma Shaw; Shirley Page
1998	South Africa; Hester Bekker; Loraine Victor; Lorna Trigwell; Trish Steyn	Australia; Lee Poletti; Karen Murphy; Margaret Sumner; Marilyn Peddell	Malaysia; Siti Zalina Ahmad; Haslah Hassan; Nor Azwa Mohamed Di; Nor Hashimah Ismail
2002	England; Carol Duckworth; Ellen Alexander; Gill Mitchell; Shirley Page	Canada; Andrea Weigand; Anita Nivala; Melissa Ranger; Shirley Fitzpatrick-Wong	New Zealand; Anne Lomas; Jan Khan; Patsy Jorgensen; Wendy Jensen
2002	England; Carol Duckworth; Ellen Alexander; Gill Mitchell; Shirley Page	Canada; Andrea Weigand; Anita Nivala; Melissa Ranger; Shirley Fitzpatrick-Wong	Wales; Ann Sutherland; Gill Miles; Nina Shipperlee; Pam John
2014	South Africa; Esme Steyn; Santjie Steyn; Tracy-Lee Botha; Susan Nel	Malaysia; Emma Firyana Saroji; Nur Fidrah Noh; Nor Hashimah Ismail; Azlina Arshad	New Zealand; Selina Goddard; Amy McIlroy; Val Smith; Mandy Boyd
2018	Australia; Carla Krizanic; Kelsey Cottrell; Natasha Scott; Rebecca Van Asch	South Africa; Elma Davis; Esme Kruger; Johanna Snyman; Nicolene Neal	Malta; Connie-Leigh Rixon; Rebecca Rixon; Rosemaree Rixon; Sharon Callus
2022	India; Rupa Rani Tirkey; Nayanmoni Saikia; Lovely Choubey; Pinki Singh	South Africa; Thabelo Muvhango; Bridget Calitz; Esme Kruger; Johanna Snyman	New Zealand; Selina Goddard; Nicole Toomey; Tayla Bruce; Val Smith

== Para-sport ==
=== Men's visually impaired singles ===
Games	Gold	Silver	Bronze
1994	Robert Brand; Scotland	John Hubbard; Australia	Craig Nolan; New Zealand; Carlos Braga Antunes; Hong Kong

=== Women's visually impaired singles ===
Games	Gold	Silver	Bronze
1994	Catherine Portas; New Zealand	Gloria Hopkins; Wales	Margaret Lynne; England; Sunny Tank; Hong Kong

Games	Gold	Silver	Bronze
2002	Ruth Small; England	Constance Sibanda; Zimbabwe	Vivian Berkeley; Canada; Mukri Moira; Malaysia

=== Mixed pairs ===
Event	Gold	Silver	Bronze
2014	South Africa; Gwen Nel; Annatjie van Rooyen; Geoff Newcombe; Herman Scholtz	Scotland; David Thomas; Ron McArthur; Robert Conway; Irene Edgar	Australia; Tony Scott; Bruce Jones; Joy Forster; Peter Scott
2018	Australia; Jake Fehlberg; Lynne Seymour	South Africa; Philippus Walker; Nozipho Schroeder	Wales; Gilbert Miles; Julie Thomas

=== Open triples ===
Event	Gold	Silver	Bronze
2014	South Africa; Deon Van De Vyver; Roger Hagerty; Lobban Derrick	New Zealand; Lynda Bennett; Barry Wynks; Mark Noble	England; Bob Love; David Fisher; Paul Brown
2018	Australia; Josh Thornton; Ken Hanson; Tony Bonnell	New Zealand; Barry Wynks; Bruce Wakefield; Mark Noble	South Africa; Christopher Patton; Tobias Botha; Willem Viljoen

== See also ==
- World Bowls Events
- Lawn bowls at the Commonwealth Games
