= Lawn bowls at the Commonwealth Games =

Commonwealth Games sport

Tournament information
- Sport: Lawn bowls
- Location: Various
- Established: 1930
- Administrator: Commonwealth Games Federation

Bowls is one of the sports at the quadrennial Commonwealth Games competition. It has been a Commonwealth Games sport since the inaugural edition of the event's precursor, the 1930 British Empire Games. It is a core sport and must be included in the sporting programme of each edition of the Games; however, it was not included in the programme of the 1966 Commonwealth Games in Kingston, Jamaica due to no sufficient bowling greens being available. Along with swimming, athletics, cycling, table tennis, powerlifting and triathlon, bowls is one of the EAD (Elite Athletes with a Disability) sports. In 2026 for the first time the indoor version of the sport shall be held.

== Editions ==
Games	Year	Host city	Host country	Best Nation
I	1930	Hamilton, Ontario	Canada	England
II	1934	London	England	England
III	1938	Sydney, New South Wales	Australia	New Zealand
IV	1950	Auckland	New Zealand	New Zealand
V	1954	Vancouver, British Columbia	Canada	Southern Rhodesia, South Africa
VI	1958	Cardiff	Wales	South Africa
VII	1962	Perth, Western Australia	Australia	England
IX	1970	Edinburgh	Scotland	England
X	1974	Christchurch	New Zealand	England
XI	1978	Edmonton, Alberta	Canada	Hong Kong
XII	1982	Brisbane, Queensland	Australia	Scotland
XIII	1986	Edinburgh	Scotland	Wales
XIV	1990	Auckland	New Zealand	Australia
XV	1994	Victoria, British Columbia	Canada	Scotland
XVI	1998	Kuala Lumpur	Malaysia	South Africa
XVII	2002	Manchester	England	England
XVIII	2006	Melbourne, Victoria	Australia	Australia
XIX	2010	Delhi	India	South Africa
XX	2014	Glasgow	Scotland	South Africa
XXI	2018	Gold Coast, Queensland	Australia	Australia
XXII	2022	Birmingham	England	Australia
XXIII	2026	Glasgow	Scotland	England

== Commonwealth champions ==
Commonwealth champions tabulated:

=== Men's singles ===
Year	Winner
1930	(England) Robert Colquhoun
1934	(Scotland) Robert Sprot
1938	(South Africa) Horace Harvey
1950	(New Zealand) James "Ham" Pirret
1954	(Southern Rhodesia) Ralph Hodges
1958	(South Africa) Phineas 'Pinky' Danilowitz
1962	(England) David Bryant (1/4)
1970	(England) David Bryant (2/4)
1974	(England) David Bryant (3/4)
1978	(England) David Bryant (4/4)
1982	(Scotland) Willie Wood

Year	Winner
1986	(New Zealand) Ian Dickison
1990	(Australia) Rob Parrella
1994	(Scotland) Richard Corsie
1998	(Zimbabwe) Roy Garden
2002	(South Africa) Bobby Donnelly
2006	(Australia) Kelvin Kerkow
2010	(Wales) Robert Weale
2014	(Scotland) Darren Burnett
2018	(Australia) Aaron Wilson (1/2)
2022	(Australia) Aaron Wilson (2/2)
2026	(England) Sam Tolchard

=== Men's pairs ===
Year	Winner
1930	(England) Tommy Hills & George Wright (1/2)
1934	(England) Tommy Hills & George Wright (2/2)
1938	(New Zealand) Lance Macey & Walter Denison
1950	(New Zealand) Robert Henry & Phil Exelby
1954	(Northern Ireland) William Rosbotham & Percy Watson
1958	(New Zealand) John Morris & Ted Pilkington
1962	(New Zealand) Bob McDonald & Robbie Robson
1970	(England) Norman King & Peter Line
1974	(Scotland) Jack Christie & Alex McIntosh
1978	(Hong Kong) Eric Liddell & Saco Delgado
1982	(Scotland) John Watson & David Gourlay Sr.

Year	Winner
1986	(Scotland) Grant Knox & George Adrain
1990	(Australia) Ian Schuback & Trevor Morris
1994	(Australia) Rex Johnston & Cameron Curtis
1998	(Australia) Brett Duprez & Mark Jacobsen
2002	(Scotland) Alex Marshall (1/3) & George Sneddon
2006	(Scotland) Alex Marshall (2/3) & Paul Foster (1/2)
2010	(South Africa) Shaun Addinall & Gerry Baker
2014	(Scotland) Alex Marshall (3/3) & Paul Foster (2/2)
2018	(Wales) Daniel Salmon (1/2) & Marc Wyatt
2022	(Wales) Daniel Salmon (2/2) & Jarrad Breen
2026	(Northern Ireland) Gary Kelly & Adam McKeown

=== Men's triples ===
Year	Winner
2006	(Australia) Bill Cornehls, Mark Casey & Wayne Turley
2010	(South Africa) Johann du Plessis, Wayne Perry & Gidion Vermeulen
2014	(South Africa) Petrus Breitenbach, Prince Neluonde & Bobby Donnelly
2018	(Scotland) Darren Burnett, Derek Oliver & Ronnie Duncan
2022	(England) Louis Ridout, Nick Brett & Jamie Chestney
2026	not held

=== Men's fours ===
Year	Winner
1930	(England) Ernie Gudgeon, James Edney, James Frith & Albert Hough
1934	(England) Robert Slater, Ernie Gudgeon, Percy Tomlinson & Fred Biggin
1938	(New Zealand) Bill Bremner, Alec Robertson, Ernie Jury & Bill Whittaker
1950	(South Africa) Herbert Currer, Harry Atkinson, Alfred Blumberg & Snowy Walker
1954	(South Africa) Frank Mitchell, George Wilson, John Anderson & Wilfred Randall
1958	(England) Norman King, John Bettles, Walter Phillips & John Scadgell
1962	(England) David Bryant, Les Watson, Sidney Drysdale & Tom Fleming
1970	(Hong Kong) Abdul Kitchell, Saco Delgado, George Souza Sr. & Roberto da Silva
1974	(New Zealand) Kerry Clark, David Baldwin, John Somerville & Gordon Jolly
1978	(Hong Kong) Philip Chok, M B Hassan Jr., Omar Dallah & Roberto da Silva

Year	Winner
1982	(Australia) Rob Dobbins, Keith Poole, Bert Sharp & Don Sherman
1986	(Wales) Hafod Thomas, Jim Morgan, Robert Weale & Will Thomas
1990	(Scotland) Denis Love, George Adrain, Ian Bruce & Willie Wood
1994	(South Africa) Alan Lofthouse, Donald Piketh, Neil Burkett & Robert Rayfield
1998	(Northern Ireland) Gary McCloy, Ian McClure(1/2), Martin McHugh(1/2) & Neil Booth
2002	(England) John Ottaway, Simon Skelton, Robert Newman & David Holt
2014	(Scotland) Alex Marshall (1/2), Paul Foster (1/2), Neil Speirs & David Peacock
2018	(Scotland) Alex Marshall (2/2), Paul Foster (2/2), Derek Oliver & Ronnie Duncan
2022	(Northern Ireland) Sam Barkley, Adam McKeown, Ian McClure(2/2), Martin McHugh(2/2)
2026	not held

=== Women's singles ===
Year	Winner
1986	(England) Wendy Line
1990	(Papua New Guinea) Geua Vada Tau
1994	(Northern Ireland) Margaret Johnston
1998	(South Africa) Lesley Hartwell
2002	(Malaysia) Siti Zalina Ahmad (1/2)
2006	(Malaysia) Siti Zalina Ahmad (2/2)

Year	Winner
2010	(England) Natalie Melmore
2014	(New Zealand) Jo Edwards (1/2)
2018	(New Zealand) Jo Edwards (2/2)
2022	(Australia) Ellen Ryan
2026	(England) Katherine Rednall

=== Women's pairs ===
Year	Winner
1986	(Northern Ireland) Margaret Johnston & Freda Elliott
1990	(New Zealand) Judy Howat & Marie Watson
1994	(Scotland) Frances Whyte & Sarah Gourlay
1998	(Scotland) Margaret Letham & Joyce Lindores
2002	(New Zealand) Jo Edwards & Sharon Sims
2006	(Australia) Lynsey Armitage & Karen Murphy

Year	Winner
2010	(England) Ellen Falkner & Amy Monkhouse
2014	(South Africa) Tracy-Lee Botha & Colleen Piketh
2018	(Malaysia) Emma Firyana Saroji & Siti Zalina Ahmad
2022	(Australia) Kristina Krstic & Ellen Ryan
2026	(England) Amy Pharaoh & Sian Honnor

=== Women's triples ===
Year	Winner
1982	(Zimbabwe) Flo Kennedy, Anna Bates & Margaret Mills
2006	(Malaysia) Azlina Arshad, Nor Iryani Azmi & Nor Hashimah Ismail
2010	(South Africa) Tracy-Lee Botha, Susan Nel & Santjie Steyn
2014	(England) Sophie Tolchard, Ellen Falkner & Sian Gordon (1/2)
2018	(Australia) Carla Krizanic, Natasha Scott & Rebecca Van Asch
2022	(England) Jamie-Lea Winch, Natalie Chestney & Sian Honnor (2/2)
2026	not held

=== Women's fours ===
Year	Winner
1986	(Wales) Linda Parker, Linda Evans, Joan Ricketts & Rita Jones
1990	(Australia) Audrey Rutherford, Daphne Shaw, Dorothy Roche, Marion Stevens
1994	(South Africa) Anna Pretorius, Colleen Grondein, Hester Bekker (1/2), Lorna Trigwell (1/2)
1998	(South Africa) Loraine Victor, Trish Steyn, Hester Bekker (2/2), Lorna Trigwell (2/2)

Year	Winner
2002	(England) Ellen Alexander, Shirley Page, Gill Mitchell, Carol Duckworth
2014	(South Africa) Esme Steyn, Santjie Steyn, Tracy-Lee Botha, Susan Nel
2018	(Australia) Carla Krizanic, Kelsey Cottrell, Natasha Scott, Rebecca Van Asch
2022	(India) Rupa Rani Tirkey, Nayanmoni Saikia, Lovely Choubey, Pinki Singh
2026	not held

=== Para-sport ===
Men's blind singles

Year	Winner
1994	(Scotland) Robert Brand

Men's Pairs

Year	Winner
2022	(Scotland); Garry Brown and Kevin Wallace

Women's blind singles

Year	Winner
1994	(New Zealand) Catherine Portas
2002	(England) Ruth Small

Women's Pairs

Year	Winner
2022	(Scotland); Rosemary Lenton; Pauline Wilson

Mixed Pairs

Year	Winner
2018	(Australia) Jake Fehlberg, Lynne Seymour
2022	(Scotland); Melanie Inness; Robert Barr

Open triples

Year	Winner
2002	(Scotland) David Heddie, Ivan Prior & John Robertson
2014	(South Africa) Deon Van De Vyver, Roger Hagerty & Lobban Derrick
2018	(Australia) Josh Thornton, Ken Hanson & Tony Bonnell

Mixed fours B2 & B3

Year	Winner
2014	(South Africa) Geoffrey Newcombe, Gyndolene Nel, Hermanus Scholtz & Annatjie van Rooyen

== All-time overall medal table ==
*Note: From editions 1994 to 2002, two bronze medals were awarded in each event.

Updated after the 2026 Commonwealth Games

Overall table including All time Lawn Bowls and Bowls Medal Table
Rank	Nation	Gold	Silver	Bronze	Total
1	England	24	13	24	61
2	Australia	19	25	11	55
3	Scotland	19	10	13	42
4	South Africa	17	12	15	44
5	New Zealand	16	14	18	48
6	Northern Ireland	6	5	14	25
7	Wales	5	11	16	32
8	Malaysia	4	7	9	20
9	Hong Kong	3	2	4	9
10	Zimbabwe	3	1	2	6
11	India	1	1	0	2
11	Papua New Guinea	1	1	0	2
13	Canada	0	10	3	13
14	Guernsey	0	3	0	3
15	Zambia	0	1	1	2
16	Ireland	0	1	0	1
16	Namibia	0	1	0	1
18	Rhodesia and Nyasaland	0	0	4	4
19	Norfolk Island	0	0	3	3
20	Fiji	0	0	2	2
21	Botswana	0	0	1	1
21	Cook Islands	0	0	1	1
21	Malta	0	0	1	1
Totals (23 entries)		118	118	142	378

=== Lawn Bowls and Bowls All-Time Medal Table ===
*Note : From editions 1994 to 2002, two bronze medals were awarded in each event.

Updated after the 2026 Commonwealth Games

Rank	Nation	Gold	Silver	Bronze	Total
1	England	23	12	19	54
2	Australia	15	22	9	46
3	South Africa	15	11	13	39
4	New Zealand	15	10	17	42
5	Scotland	13	9	11	33
6	Northern Ireland	6	5	14	25
7	Wales	5	8	14	27
8	Malaysia	4	7	6	17
9	Hong Kong	3	2	2	7
10	Zimbabwe	3	0	2	5
11	India	1	1	0	2
11	Papua New Guinea	1	1	0	2
13	Canada	0	10	2	12
14	Guernsey	0	3	0	3
15	Zambia	0	1	1	2
16	Ireland	0	1	0	1
16	Namibia	0	1	0	1
18	Rhodesia and Nyasaland	0	0	4	4
19	Norfolk Island	0	0	3	3
20	Fiji	0	0	2	2
21	Botswana	0	0	1	1
21	Cook Islands	0	0	1	1
21	Malta	0	0	1	1
Totals (23 entries)		104	104	122	330

=== Para-Lawn Bowls and Bowls All-time medal table ===
*Note : From editions 1994 to 2002, two bronze medals were awarded in each event.

Para-Lawns bowls appeared in editions 1994, 2002, 2014-26

Updated after the 2026 Commonwealth Games

Rank	Nation	Gold	Silver	Bronze	Total
1	Scotland	6	1	0	7
2	Australia	4	3	2	9
3	South Africa	2	1	2	5
4	New Zealand	1	4	1	6
5	England	1	1	5	7
6	Wales	0	3	2	5
7	Zimbabwe	0	1	0	1
8	Malaysia	0	0	3	3
9	Hong Kong	0	0	2	2
10	Canada	0	0	1	1
Totals (10 entries)		14	14	18	46

== See also ==
- World Bowls Events
- List of Commonwealth Games medallists in lawn bowls
