= Papua New Guinea at the Commonwealth Games =

- CGF code: PNG
- CGA: Papua New Guinea Olympic Committee
- Website: pngolympic.org
- Medals Ranked 27th: Gold 5 Silver 8 Bronze 2 Total 15

Commonwealth Games appearances (overview)
- 1962; 1966; 1970; 1974; 1978; 1982; 1986; 1990; 1994; 1998; 2002; 2006; 2010; 2014; 2018; 2022; 2026; 2030

Papua New Guinea made its Commonwealth Games début in the 1962 British Empire and Commonwealth Games in Perth, Western Australia. The country has competed in 15 editions of the Games, as of 2022

Since 1962, Papua New Guinea have won a total of 14 medals in 5 sports. Weightlifting has been the most successful sport with 7 medals followed by Boxing with 3, Lawn bowls with 2, Swimming with 2, and Shooting with 1 medal.

== Medals ==
After the 2018 Commonwealth Games, Papua New Guinea ranks 26th on the All-time Commonwealth Games medal table.

| | (gold) | (silver) | (bronze) | Total |
|---|---|---|---|---|
| Papua New Guinea | 5 | 8 | 2 | 15 |

=== List of gold medallists ===
| Medal | Name | Games | Sport | Event |
|---|---|---|---|---|
| Gold | Geua Tau | 1990 Auckland | Lawn Bowls | Singles-Women |
| Gold | Ryan Pini | 2006 Melbourne | Swimming | Men's 100 metres butterfly |
| Gold | Dika Toua | 2014 Glasgow | Weightlifting | Women's 53 kg |
| Gold | Steven Kari | 2014 Glasgow | Weightlifting | Men's 94 kg |
| Gold | Steven Kari | 2018 Gold Coast | Weightlifting | Men's 94 kg |

=== List of silver medallists ===
| Medal | Name | Games | Sport | Event |
|---|---|---|---|---|
| Silver | Robert Stewart | 1966 Kingston | Rifle | Fullbore Rifle Queens Prize (Pair) - Open |
| Silver | Tumat Sogolik | 1978 Edmonton | Boxing | Bantamweight Division |
| Silver | Cunera Monalua; Elizabeth Bure; Linda Ahmat; Wena Piande | 1994 Victoria | Lawn Bowls | Women's Fours - round robin |
| Silver | Dika Toua | 2006 Melbourne | Weightlifting | Women's 53 kg |
| Silver | Dika Toua | 2018 Gold Coast | Weightlifting | Women's −53 kg |
| Silver | Ryan Pini | 2010 Delhi | Swimming | Men's 100 metres butterfly |
| Silver | Morea Baru | 2018 Gold Coast | Weightlifting | Men's −62 kg |
| Silver | Morea Baru | 2022 Birmingham | Weightlifting | Men's 61 kg |

=== List of Bronze medallists ===
| Medal | Name | Games | Sport | Event |
|---|---|---|---|---|
| Bronze | Kenneth Hopkins | 1962 Perth | Boxing | Men's light middleweight |
| Bronze | Lynch Ipera | 1998 Kuala Lumpur | Boxing | Men's featherweight |

== Games Summary ==
| Games | Gold | Silver | Bronze | Total | Rank | Competitors | Officials | Flag Bearer Opening | Flag Bearer Closing |
|---|---|---|---|---|---|---|---|---|---|
| (Australia) 1962 Perth | 0 | 0 | 1 | 1 | 17 | | | | |
| (Jamaica) 1966 Kingston | 0 | 1 | 0 | 1 | 20 | | | | |
| (Scotland) 1970 Edinburgh | 0 | 0 | 0 | 0 | - | | | | |
| (New Zealand) 1974 Christchurch | 0 | 0 | 0 | 0 | - | | | | |
| (Canada) 1978 Edmonton | 0 | 1 | 0 | 1 | 18 | | | | |
| (Australia) 1982 Brisbane | 0 | 0 | 0 | 0 | - | | | | |
| (New Zealand) 1990 Auckland | 1 | 0 | 0 | 1 | 19 | | | | |
| (Canada) 1994 Victoria | 0 | 1 | 0 | 1 | 20 | | | Geua Vada Tau | |
| (Malaysia) 1998 Kuala Lumpur | 0 | 0 | 1 | 1 | 32 | | | | |
| (England) 2002 Manchester | 0 | 0 | 0 | 0 | - | | | | |
| (Australia) 2006 Melbourne | 1 | 1 | 0 | 2 | 18 | | | | |
| (India) 2010 Delhi | 0 | 1 | 0 | 1 | 29 | | | Barbara Stubbings | |
| (Scotland) 2014 Glasgow | 2 | 0 | 0 | 2 | 16 | | | Steven Kari | |
| (Australia) 2018 Gold Coast | 1 | 2 | 0 | 3 | 22 | | | Vero Nime | |
| (England) 2022 Birmingham | 0 | 1 | 0 | 1 | 35 | | | Rellie Kaputin and John Ume | |
| Total | 5 | 8 | 2 | 14 | 26 | | | | |

== Notable achievements ==
First medal

- Kenneth Hopkins won Papua New Guinea's first ever Commonwealth Games medal in Boxing during the nation's debut commonwealth games in 1962. It was a bronze medal in the men's 71 kg category.

First gold medal

- Geua Tau won the country's first Commonwealth games gold by defeating New Zealand's Millie Khan 25-18 in lawn bowls for the women's singles event at the 1990 Commonwealth Games.

Most gold medals

- Steven Kari has won the most gold medals for Papua New Guinea in Weightlifting. Kari has won 2 gold medals both in successive games in 2014, and 2018.

Most medals

- Dika Toua is the country's most decorated athlete at the Commonwealth games with 3 medals (1 gold and 2 silvers) in Weightlifting. The weightlifter won gold in 2014 and silver medals 1 in 2006 and the other in 2018.
