= 2000 World Outdoor Bowls Championship – Women's singles =

World bowls event

World Outdoor Championships 2000 – women's singles
- 9th World Outdoor Bowls Championships
- Location: Moama, Australia
- Date(s): 8 March - 25 March 2000
- Category: World Outdoor Championships

The 2000 World Outdoor Bowls Championship women's singles was held in Moama, Australia, from 8–25 March 2000.

The gold medal was won by Margaret Johnston of Ireland.

== Section tables ==
=== Section A ===
Pos	Player	P	W	L	Pts
1	Margaret Johnston	16	13	3	26 (+117)
2	(Jersey) Karina Horman	16	13	3	26 (+73)
3	(Scotland) Margaret Letham	16	12	4	24
4	(New Zealand) Marlene Castle	16	11	5	22
5	(Norfolk Island) Carmen Anderson	16	10	6	20 (+56)
6	(South Africa) Lesley Hartwell	16	10	6	20 (+43)
7	(Papua New Guinea) Geua Vada Tau	16	10	6	20 (+35)
8	(Fiji) Radhika Prasad	16	9	7	18
9	(Zimbabwe) Cora Howard-Williams	16	8	8	16 (+19)
10	(Zambia) Hilda Luipa	16	8	8	16 (-4)
11	(India) Renu Mohta	16	8	8	16 (-29)
12	(Spain) Doreen Ives	16	6	10	12
13	(Cook Islands) Kanny Vaile	16	5	11	10 (-35)
14	(Singapore) Rosemary Tessensohn	16	5	11	10 (-64)
15	(United States) Katy Stone	16	5	11	10 (-69)
16	(Netherlands) Norma Duin	16	3	13	6
17	(Brazil) Lair Biagnini	16	0	16	0

=== Section B ===
Pos	Player	P	W	L	Pts
1	(Wales) Rita Jones	16	14	2	28 (+188)
2	(Australia) Karen Murphy	16	14	2	28 (+159)
3	(England) Jean Baker	16	14	2	28 (+124)
4	(Eswatini) Karin McGravie	16	12	4	24
5	(Guernsey) Alison Merrien	16	10	6	20 (+83)
6	(Israel) Ruthie Gilor	16	10	6	20 (+39)
7	(Kenya) Maureen Burns	16	10	6	20 (+12)
8	(Canada) Margaret Richards	16	10	6	20 (+6)
9	(Malaysia) Nor Hashimah Ismail	16	9	7	18
10	(Namibia) Jean Joubert	16	8	8	16
11	(Hong Kong) Anna Clarke	16	6	10	12
12	(Argentina) Alicia Goodliffe	16	5	11	10 (-54)
13	(Brunei) Suhana Hati Mohd Daud	16	5	11	10 (-70)
14	(Botswana) Lynda Houghton	16	5	11	10 (-76)
15	(Thailand) Jit Healy	16	3	13	6
16	(Samoa) Faaniniv a Paulo	16	1	15	2
17	(Japan) C Ito	16	0	16	0

== Results ==
Women's singles section A
Round 1 - (17 Mar)		
Scotland	Norfolk Island	21–6
Jersey	Spain	21–16
{{}}	{{}}	21–
{{}}	{{}}	21–
{{}}	{{}}	21–
{{}}	{{}}	21–
{{}}	{{}}	21–
{{}}	{{}}	21–
Round 2 - (17 Mar)		
Scotland	United States	21–10
Jersey	Brazil	21–15
Ireland	Spain	21–6
{{}}	{{}}	21–
{{}}	{{}}	21–
{{}}	{{}}	21–
{{}}	{{}}	21–
{{}}	{{}}	21–
Round 3 - (18 Mar)		
Ireland	Papua New Guinea	21–6
Jersey	Fiji	21–14
Scotland	Cook Islands	21–11
Norfolk Island	Singapore	21–6
{{}}	{{}}	21–
{{}}	{{}}	21–
{{}}	{{}}	21–
{{}}	{{}}	21–
Round 4 - (18 Mar)		
Ireland	Zambia	21–20
Norfolk Island	Jersey	21–13
Scotland	New Zealand	21–18
{{}}	{{}}	21–
{{}}	{{}}	21–
{{}}	{{}}	21–
{{}}	{{}}	21–
{{}}	{{}}	21–
Round 5 - (18 Mar)		
Singapore	Zambia	21–15
Ireland	Netherlands	21–7
Jersey	Papua New Guinea	21–8
Norfolk Island	Brazil	21–1
South Africa	United States	21–18
Fiji	Spain	21–19
New Zealand	Cook Islands	21–10
Scotland	India	21–9
Round 6 - (19 Mar)		
Ireland	Cook Islands	21–10
Norfolk Island	Spain	21–12
Jersey	Zambia	21–12
Scotland	Singapore	21–3
{{}}	{{}}	21–
{{}}	{{}}	21–
{{}}	{{}}	21–
{{}}	{{}}	21–
Round 7 - (19 Mar)		
Ireland	Brazil	21–7
Jersey	India	21–11
Fiji	Norfolk Island	21–9
{{}}	{{}}	–
{{}}	{{}}	–
{{}}	{{}}	–
{{}}	{{}}	–
{{}}	{{}}	–
Round 8 - (20 Mar)		
Spain	Singapore	21–10
Jersey	Cook Islands	21–20
South Africa	Netherlands	21–9
India	Ireland	21–19
Fiji	United States	21–10
Zambia	New Zealand	21–18
Scotland	Brazil	21–3
Papua New Guinea	Zimbabwe	21–11
Round 9 - (20 Mar)		
Cook Islands	United States	21–12
India	Zimbabwe	21–10
Jersey	Singapore	21–9
Zambia	Norfolk Island	21–13
Papua New Guinea	Netherlands	21–6
Ireland	South Africa	21–14
Fiji	Scotland	21–16
Spain	Brazil	21–12
Round 10 - (21 Mar)		
Scotland	Zimbabwe	21–18
Jersey	Ireland	21–15
Fiji	Zambia	21–20
South Africa	New Zealand	21–15
Singapore	Brazil	21–7
Norfolk Island	Papua New Guinea	21–17
India	Spain	21–11
United States	Netherlands	21–9
Round 11 - (21 Mar)		
Scotland	Zambia	21–7
Ireland	Fiji	21–6
Zimbabwe	Brazil	21–8
Spain	Papua New Guinea	21–17
Cook Islands	Netherlands	21–11
United States	Singapore	21–18
Norfolk Island	New Zealand	21–9
South Africa	India	21–20
Round 12 - (22 Mar)		
Papua New Guinea	Scotland	21–19
Norfolk Island	Cook Islands	21–13
India	Brazil	21–14
Spain	Netherlands	21–4
Jersey	South Africa	21–12
New Zealand	Fiji	21–12
United States	Zambia	21–18
Ireland	Zimbabwe	21–7
Round 13 - (22 Mar)		
Scotland	Spain	21–16
New Zealand	Jersey	21–14
Norfolk Island	United States	21–11
Fiji	Papua New Guinea	21–11
Ireland	Singapore	21–17
Zambia	Zimbabwe	21–11
India	Cook Islands	21–16
Netherlands	Brazil	21–14
Round 14 - (23 Mar)		
New Zealand	Netherlands	21–9
Cook Islands	South Africa	21–14
Fiji	Brazil	21–4
Ireland	Norfolk Island	21–18
India	Zambia	21–19
Jersey	United States	21–15
Zimbabwe	Spain	21–7
Papua New Guinea	Singapore	21–17
Round 15 - (23 Mar)		
Jersey	Scotland	21–11
New Zealand	Ireland	21–13
South Africa	Zambia	21–14
Spain	United States	21–11
Singapore	India	21–18
Netherlands	Fiji	21–18
Cook Islands	Brazil	21–13
Zimbabwe	Norfolk Island	21–20
Round 16 - (24 Mar)		
Netherlands	Jersey	21–14
Scotland	Ireland	21–16+
Spain	Cook Islands	21–17
Papua New Guinea	India	21–5
Zimbabwe	United States	21–10
South Africa	Singapore	21–13
Zambia	Brazil	21–18
{{}}	{{}}	21–
Round 17 - (24 Mar)		
Ireland	United States	21–10
Scotland	Netherlands	21–10
Jersey	Zimbabwe	21–10
Papua New Guinea	New Zealand	21–16
Zambia	Cook Islands	21–17
Norfolk Island	India	21–8
Fiji	Singapore	21–11
South Africa	Spain	21–9

+ Ireland awarded match following appeal over bowls used by Scotland

Women's singles section B
Round 1 - (17 Mar)		
Wales	England	21–9
Guernsey	Thailand	21–6
{{}}	{{}}	21–
{{}}	{{}}	21–
{{}}	{{}}	21–
{{}}	{{}}	21–
{{}}	{{}}	21–
{{}}	{{}}	21–
Round 2 - (17 Mar)		
England	Japan	21–4
Wales	Argentina	21–4
Guernsey	Samoa	21–7
{{}}	{{}}	21–
{{}}	{{}}	21–
{{}}	{{}}	21–
{{}}	{{}}	21–
{{}}	{{}}	21–
Round 3 - (18 Mar)		
Wales	Samoa	21–7
Guernsey	Malaysia	21–3
England	Namibia	21–7
{{}}	{{}}	21–
{{}}	{{}}	21–
{{}}	{{}}	21–
{{}}	{{}}	21–
{{}}	{{}}	21–
Round 4 - (18 Mar)		
Guernsey	Botswana	21–9
England	Malaysia	21–14
Wales	Canada	21–8
{{}}	{{}}	21–
{{}}	{{}}	21–
{{}}	{{}}	21–
{{}}	{{}}	21–
{{}}	{{}}	21–
Round 5 - (18 Mar)		
Australia	Japan	21–1
Canada	Samoa	21–19
Malaysia	Israel	21–17
(Eswatini) Swaziland	Namibia	21–8
Wales	Thailand	21–4
England	Brunei	21–10
Kenya	Guernsey	21–19
Argentina	Botswana	21–6
Round 6 - (19 Mar)		
England	Kenya	21–8
Guernsey	Hong Kong	21–17
Wales	Namibia	21–7
{{}}	{{}}	21–
{{}}	{{}}	21–
{{}}	{{}}	21–
{{}}	{{}}	21–
{{}}	{{}}	21–
Round 7 - (19 Mar)		
Wales	Botswana	21–1
England	Guernsey	21–19
{{}}	{{}}	21–
{{}}	{{}}	21–
{{}}	{{}}	21–
{{}}	{{}}	21–
{{}}	{{}}	21–
{{}}	{{}}	21–
Round 8 - (20 Mar)		
Namibia	Kenya	21–7
Guernsey	Argentina	21–11
Australia	Thailand	21–3
Wales	Brunei	21–7
Canada	(Eswatini) Swaziland	21–16
Botswana	Japan	21–8
Malaysia	Samoa	21–13
Israel	Hong Kong	21–7
Round 9 - (20 Mar)		
Argentina	Samoa	21–18
Israel	Japan	21–12
Kenya	Brunei	21–15
Australia	Botswana	21–5
England	(Eswatini) Swaziland	21–10
Wales	Guernsey	21–9
Hong Kong	Thailand	21–4
Malaysia	Namibia	21–3
Round 10 - (21 Mar)		
Israel	England	21–12
Wales	Hong Kong	21–7
(Eswatini) Swaziland	Guernsey	21–17
Argentina	Japan	21–18
Kenya	Thailand	21–14
Namibia	Brunei	21–17
Australia	Malaysia	21–5
Canada	Botswana	21–19
Round 11 - (21 Mar)		
(Eswatini) Swaziland	Wales	21–19
England	Canada	21–8
Samoa	Japan	21–7
Hong Kong	Brunei	21–7
Australia	Guernsey	21–10
Thailand	Botswana	21–17
Namibia	Argentina	21–16
Kenya	Israel	21–8
Round 12 - (22 Mar)		
Kenya	Japan	21–9
Brunei	Thailand	21–17
Wales	Israel	21–14
Guernsey	Canada	21–16
Botswana	Malaysia	21–18
Australia	Hong Kong	21–9
England	Samoa	21–14
(Eswatini) Swaziland	Argentina	21–20
Round 13 - (22 Mar)		
Australia	Namibia	21–5
Israel	Guernsey	21–12
England	Argentina	21–14
Brunei	Japan	21–11
(Eswatini) Swaziland	Hong Kong	21–16
Canada	Malaysia	21–19
Thailand	Samoa	21–9
Wales	Kenya	21–12
Round 14 - (23 Mar)		
Guernsey	Brunei	21–13
England	Australia	21–13
Canada	Japan	21–19
(Eswatini) Swaziland	Thailand	21–12
Botswana	Samoa	21–16
Kenya	Hong Kong	21–7
Namibia	Israel	21–14
Malaysia	Argentina	21–12
Round 15 - (23 Mar)		
Wales	Malaysia	21–11
England	Hong Kong	21–13
Guernsey	Japan	21–5
Kenya	Argentina	21–20
Namibia	Thailand	21–16
(Eswatini) Swaziland	Botswana	21–15
Brunei	Samoa	21–16
Canada	Australia	21–16
Round 16 - (24 Mar)		
Australia	Wales	21–19
England	Botswana	21–7
Argentina	Hong Kong	21–17
Malaysia	Japan	21–0
(Eswatini) Swaziland	Brunei	21–15
Kenya	Samoa	21–9
Israel	Thailand	21–16
Canada	Namibia	21–11
Round 17 - (24 Mar)		
Guernsey	Namibia	21–10
Wales	Japan	21–2
England	Thailand	21–6
Kenya	Botswana	21–12
(Eswatini) Swaziland	Samoa	21–10
Malaysia	Hong Kong	21–4
Israel	Canada	21–9
Australia	Argentina	21–9

== Bronze-medal match ==
(Australia) Murphy bt (Jersey) Horman 21-4

== Gold-medal match ==
Johnston bt (Wales) Jones 21-14
