= Lawn bowls at the 1994 Commonwealth Games =

- Venue: Juan de Fuca Bowling Club
- Location: Victoria, Canada
- Dates: 18–28 August 1994

Lawn bowls at the 1994 Commonwealth Games was the 14th appearance of the lawn bowls at the Commonwealth Games. Competition at the 1994 Commonwealth Games took place at the Juan de Fuca Bowling Club in Victoria, Canada, from 18 August until 28 August 1994.

Scotland topped the lawn bowls medal table by virtue of winning three gold medals.

== Medal table ==
* Host nation (Canada)

Rank	Nation	Gold	Silver	Bronze	Total
1	Scotland	3	0	1	4
2	South Africa	2	1	0	3
3	Australia	1	2	1	4
4	New Zealand	1	0	3	4
5	Northern Ireland	1	0	2	3
6	Wales	0	3	1	4
7	England	0	1	4	5
8	Papua New Guinea	0	1	0	1
9	Hong Kong	0	0	3	3
10	Norfolk Island	0	0	1	1
Totals (10 entries)		8	8	16	32

== Medallists ==
Event	Gold	Silver	Bronze	Bronze
Men's singles	(Scotland) Richard Corsie	(England) Tony Allcock	(Australia) Rob Parrella	(Hong Kong) Ken Wallis
Men's pairs	(Australia) Rex Johnston; Cameron Curtis	(Wales) Robert Weale; John Price	(England) Andy Thomson; Gary Smith	(Northern Ireland) Sammy Allen; Stephen Adamson
Men's Fours	(South Africa) Alan Lofthouse; Donald Piketh; Neil Burkett; Robert Rayfield	(Australia) Ian Taylor; Robert Ball; Stephen Anderson; Steve Srhoy	(Northern Ireland) Ian McClure; John McCloughlin; Noel Graham; Victor Dallas	(New Zealand) Bruce McNish; Peter Belliss; Rowan Brassey; Stewart Buttar
Women's singles	(Northern Ireland) Margaret Johnston	(Wales) Rita Jones	(England) Norma Shaw	(Norfolk Island) Carmen Anderson
Women's pairs	(Scotland) Frances Whyte; Sarah Gourlay	(South Africa) Jo Peacock; Lyn Dwyer	(Wales) Ann Dainton; Janet Ackland	(England) Brenda Atherton; Mary Price
Women's Fours	(South Africa) Anna Pretorius; Colleen Grondein; Hester Bekker; Lorna Trigwell	(Papua New Guinea) Cunera Monalua; Elizabeth Bure; Linda Ahmat; Wena Piande	(New Zealand) Adrienne Lambert; Ann Muir; Colleen Ferrick; Marlene Castle	(Scotland) Dorothy Barr; Betty Forsyth; Elizabeth Dickson; Janice Maxwell

Para sport

Event	Gold	Silver	Bronze	Bronze
Men's Blind Singles	(Scotland) Robert Brand	(Australia) John Hubbard	(New Zealand) Craig Nolan	(Hong Kong) Carlos Braga Antunes
Women's Blind Singles	(New Zealand) Catherine Portas	(Wales) Gloria Hopkins	(England) Margareth Lyne	(Hong Kong) Sunny Tang

== Results ==
=== Men's singles – round robin ===
==== Section A ====
Pos	Player	P	W	L	Pts
1	(England) Tony Allcock	10	9	1	9
2	(Australia) Rob Parrella +	10	8	2	8
3	(Zimbabwe) Mark McCormick	10	8	2	8
4	(New Zealand) Gary Lawson	10	6	4	6
5	(Northern Ireland) Jackie Smyth	10	6	4	6
6	(Cook Islands) Philip Ulrich	10	5	5	5
7	(Norfolk Island) Dan Thornton	10	4	6	4
8	(Namibia) Ian Crawford	10	3	7	3
9	(Papua New Guinea) Kundy Micky	10	3	7	3
10	(Botswana) Allen Bergg	10	2	8	2
11	(Brunei) Haji Naim Brahim	10	1	9	1

==== Section B ====
Pos	Player	P	W	L	Pts
1	(Scotland) Richard Corsie	10	9	1	9
2	(Hong Kong) Ken Wallis +	10	8	2	8
3	(Jersey) David Le Marquand	10	7	3	7
4	(Canada) Mark Gilliland	10	6	4	6
5	(South Africa) Kevin Campbell	10	5	5	5
6	(Wales) Will Thomas	10	5	5	5
7	(Zambia) Jacob van Deventer	10	5	5	5
8	(Guernsey) Adrian Welch	10	4	6	4
9	(Singapore) Hon Yoong Chai	10	4	6	4
10	(Kenya) Charles Wambagu	10	2	8	2
11	(Samoa) Tulloa E Fua	10	1	9	1

+ Awarded Bronze medals

==== Final ====
(Scotland) Corsie bt (England) Allcock 25-20

=== Men's pairs – round robin ===
==== Section A ====
Pos	Player	P	W	D	L	Pts
1	(Australia) Rex Johnston & Cameron Curtis	8	6	1	1	13
2	(England) Andy Thomson & Gary Smith +	8	5	1	2	11
3	(South Africa) Ashley van Winkel & Theuns Fraser	8	5	1	2	11
4	(Scotland) Alex Marshall & Graham Robertson	8	5	0	3	10
5	(New Zealand) Mike Kernaghan & Phil Skoglund	8	4	2	2	10
6	(Hong Kong) Mark McMahon & Bill McMahon	8	4	1	3	9
7	(Canada) Kevin Jones & Peter Mutter	8	1	2	5	4
8	(Guernsey) Bernard Simon & Neal Mollet	8	1	0	7	2
9	(Jersey) Douglas Littlechild & Lee Nixon	8	1	0	7	2

==== Section B ====
Pos	Player	P	W	D	L	Pts
1	(Wales) Robert Weale & John Price	8	6	0	2	12
2	(Northern Ireland) Sammy Allen & Stephen Adamson +	8	6	0	2	12
3	(Cook Islands) David Akaruru & Ieremia Tuteru	8	5	0	3	10
4	(Samoa) Iosefa Leavasa & Tapusatele Tuatagaloa	8	5	0	3	10
5	(Zambia) Duncan Naysmith & Ian Henderson	8	4	0	4	8
6	(Kenya) Alan Gilham & Oliver Fowler	8	4	0	4	8
7	(Norfolk Island) Barry Wilson & John Christian	8	3	0	5	6
8	(Brunei) Awg MD Salleh & Lokman HJ Mohd Salleh	8	3	0	5	6
9	(Papua New Guinea) Kossy Torao & Paddy Fagan	8	0	0	8	0

+ Awarded Bronze medals

==== Final ====
Australia bt Wales 18-14

=== Men's Fours – round robin ===
==== Section A ====
Pos	Player	P	W	D	L	F	A	Pts
1	(South Africa) Alan Lofthouse, Donald Piketh, Neil Burkett, Robert Rayfield	9	8	0	1	232	128	16
2	(Northern Ireland) Ian McClure, John McCloughlin, Noel Graham, Victor Dallas +	9	7	0	2	183	159	14
3	(Scotland) Garry Hood, Ian Laird, Willie Wood, Billy Hay	9	5	0	4	201	176	10
4	(Namibia) Douw Calitz, Hans Calitz, John Shelley, Shane Westerdale	9	5	0	4	184	198	10
5	(Hong Kong) George Souza Jr., Jun Ho, Mel Stewart, Noel Kennedy	9	4	0	5	174	162	8
6	(Jersey) Barry Noel, Alan Syvret, Allan Quemard, Cyril Renouf	9	4	0	5	178	183	8
7	(Botswana) Arthur Hicks, Clifton Richardson, Ray Mascarenhas, Timothy Morton	9	4	0	5	178	188	8
8	(Norfolk Island) Graeme Woolley, Norman Lecren, Sidney Cooper, William Adams	9	3	0	6	170	205	6
9	(Cook Islands) Here Greig, Joseph Akaruru, M Pitatotoo, Teanua Kamana	9	2	1	6	167	198	5
10	(Zambia) Billy Kasonkomona, Edwin Mbewe, Rothman Mwinga, Stanley Maynard	9	2	1	6	155	225	5

==== Section B ====
Pos	Player	P	W	D	L	Pts
1	(Australia) Ian Taylor, Robert Ball, Stephen Anderson, Steve Srhoy	9	8	0	1	16
2	(New Zealand) Bruce McNish, Peter Belliss, Rowan Brassey, Stewart Buttar +	9	7	0	2	14
3	(England) John Bell, John Rednall, Roy Cutts, Wynne Richards	9	6	1	2	13
4	(Wales) Dai Wilkins, Jim Hoskins, Phil Rowlands, Wyn Matthews	9	5	0	4	10
5	(Canada) Dave Brown, Dave Houtby, Ronnie Jones, Bill Boettger	9	5	0	4	10
6	(Zimbabwe) Garin Beare, Richard Hayden, Roy Garden, William Cumming	9	5	4	4	10
7	(Papua New Guinea) Iamo Ila, Iga Noma, Jack Wau, Tau Nancie	9	4	1	4	9
8	(Samoa) A Toalepailii, Fagalima Saifiti, Faimanu Amitunai, Mefiposeta Taulealo	9	3	0	6	6
9	(Malaysia) Mohs Aziz, S Sazeli, Shah Shalhuddin, Zakaria Yahya	9	1	0	8	0
10	(Brunei) Haji Abdul Hamid, Haji MD Taha, Haji PKN PG, Rasil Haji Ahmad	9	0	0	9	0

+ Awarded Bronze medals

==== Final ====
South Africa bt Australia 21-18

=== Women's singles – round robin ===
==== Section A ====
Pos	Player	P	W	L	Pts
1	(Northern Ireland) Margaret Johnston	8	6	2	6
2	(England) Norma Shaw +	8	6	2	6
3	(New Zealand) Judy Howat	8	6	2	6
4	(Scotland) Joyce Lindores	8	5	3	5
5	(Botswana) Babs Anderson	8	5	3	5
6	(Samoa) Leute Fua	8	3	5	3
7	(Kenya) Maureen Burns	8	2	6	2
8	(Cook Islands) Dorothy Paniani	8	2	6	2
9	(Zambia) Joyce Henderson	8	0	8	0

==== Section B ====
Pos	Player	P	W	L	Pts
1	(Wales) Rita Jones	10	7	2	7
2	(Norfolk Island) Carmen Anderson +	9	7	2	7
3	(Guernsey) Jenny Nicolle	9	7	2	7
4	(Eswatini) Liz James	9	7	2	7
5	(Australia) Edda Bonutto	9	4	5	4
6	(Hong Kong) Rosemary McMahon	9	3	6	3
7	(Papua New Guinea) Geua Vada Tau	9	3	6	3
8	(Canada) Jean Roney	9	3	6	3
9	(South Africa) Barbara Redshaw	9	2	7	2
10	(Jersey) Val Stead	9	2	7	2

+ Awarded Bronze medals

==== Final ====
(Northern Ireland) Johnston bt (Wales) Jones 25-17

=== Women's pairs – round robin ===
==== Section A ====
Pos	Player	P	W	D	L	Pts
1	(South Africa) Jo Peacock & Lyn Dwyer	8	6	1	1	13
2	(Wales) Ann Dainton & Janet Ackland +	8	5	1	2	11
3	(Northern Ireland) Barbara Cameron & Freda Elliott	8	4	2	2	10
4	(Zambia) Helen Graham & Margaret Hughes	8	4	1	3	9
5	(Eswatini) Mariana Goddard & Wendy Vickery	8	4	0	4	8
6	(Hong Kong) Linda Smith & Rae O'Donnell	8	3	0	5	6
7	(Papua New Guinea) Agnes Dean & Kieng Panap	8	3	0	5	6
8	(Cook Islands) Rebecca Akaruru & Tuhe Arahu	8	2	1	5	5
9	(Norfolk Island) Gabrielle Robertson & Winifred Buffett	8	1	0	7	2

==== Section B ====
Pos	Player	P	W	D	L	Pts
1	(Scotland) Frances Whyte & Sarah Gourlay	8	6	0	2	12
2	(England) Brenda Atherton & Mary Price +	8	6	0	2	12
3	(New Zealand) Marie Watson & Millie Khan	8	5	1	2	11
4	(Australia) Daphne Shaw & Marion Stevens	8	5	0	3	10
5	(Guernsey) Anne Simon & Sonia Hurford	8	4	0	4	8
6	(Samoa) Akenese Westerlund & Lagi Letoa	8	3	1	4	7
7	(Jersey) Sheila Syvret & Mavis Le Marquand	8	3	0	5	6
8	(Botswana) Jacqueline Rhodes & Shirley Baylis	8	3	0	5	6
9	(Canada) Christine Adams & Leona Peterson	8	0	0	8	0

+ Awarded Bronze medals

==== Final ====
Scotland bt South Africa 32-18

=== Women's Fours – round robin ===
==== Section A ====
Pos	Player	P	W	D	L	Pts
1	(South Africa) Anna Pretorius, Colleen Grondein, Hester Bekker, Lorna Trigwell	7	5	0	2	10
2	(Scotland) Dorothy Barr, Betty Forsyth, Elizabeth Dickson, Janice Maxwell +	7	5	0	2	10
3	(England) Catherine Anton, Jayne Roylance, Jean Baker, Wendy Line	7	5	0	2	10
4	(Hong Kong) Angela Chau, Jenny Wallis, Neung Ching, Sinina Yau	7	4	0	3	8
5	(Zimbabwe) Anne Morris, Margaret Mills, Patricia Landman, Patricia Woolley	7	3	1	3	7
6	(Cook Islands) Deborah Numa, Kanny Vaile, Ramona Ash, Tremoana Damm	7	2	0	5	4
7	(Samoa) Faalelei Tuatagoloa, Faamomoi Rokeni, Marie Toalepaiaii, Seupepe Sasagi	7	2	0	5	4
8	(Zambia) B van Deventer, Beatrice Mali, Chenela Lungu, Marguerite De Brito	7	1	1	5	3

==== Section B ====
Pos	Player	P	W	D	L	Pts
1	(Papua New Guinea) Cunera Monalua, Elizabeth Bure, Linda Ahmat, Wena Piande	7	5	0	2	10
2	(New Zealand) Adrienne Lambert, Ann Muir, Colleen Ferrick, Marlene Castle +	7	5	0	2	10
3	(Guernsey) Eunice Thompson, Jean Simon, Mavis Morris, Sally Paul	7	4	1	2	9
4	(Wales) Betty Morgan, Linda Evans, Mary Davies, Val Howell	7	4	0	3	8
5	(Namibia) Anne Ainsworth, Jean Joubert, Lynen King, Robyn Crawford	7	4	0	3	8
6	(Australia) Betty Herbertson, Dorothy Lergesner, Judith Nash, Margaret Sumner	7	2	1	4	5
7	(Canada) Alice Duncalf, Anita Nivala, Margaret Fettes, Margaret Richards	7	2	0	5	4
8	(Norfolk Island) Coral Nichol, Joyce Dyer, Kathleen Bailey, Marie Forsyth	7	1	0	6	2

+ Awarded Bronze medals

==== Final ====
South Africa bt Papua New Guinea 24-17

== See also ==
- List of Commonwealth Games medallists in lawn bowls
- Lawn bowls at the Commonwealth Games
