= Norfolk Island at the 1994 Commonwealth Games =

- CG code: NFI
- CGA: Norfolk Island Amateur Sports and Commonwealth Games Association
- Website: oceaniasport.com/

in Victoria, British Columbia, Canada
- Competitors: 16 in 2 sports
- Medals Ranked T27th: Gold 0 Silver 0 Bronze 1 Total 1

Commonwealth Games appearances (overview)
- 1986; 1990; 1994; 1998; 2002; 2006; 2010; 2014; 2018; 2022; 2026; 2030

Norfolk Island competed at the 1994 Commonwealth Games in Victoria, British Columbia, Canada, which were held from 18 to 28 August 1994. It was Norfolk Island's third appearance at the Commonwealth Games since its debut in 1986. The country's total delegation contained 22 members, including 16 athletes. Carmen Anderson's bronze in the women's singles lawn bowling event marked the first ever Commonwealth Games medal for the island.

== Background ==
The Games were held from 18 to 28 August 1994 in the city of Victoria, British Columbia, Canada. The island's participation in the 1994 Games marked the island's third appearance in the Commonwealth Games, having not missed a Games since the island debuted in 1986.

In the lead-up to the Games, Norfolk Island team members organized fundraisers to send the delegation to the Games, including fish fries, raffles, and cake sales. The Norfolk Island delegation arrived on the same charter flight at the Victoria International Airport as the Australian delegation. At roughly 1,800 residents, the island was the smallest territory represented at the Games. However, with 22 total members in the delegation, the island had the largest number of delegates per capita. 16 athletes represented the island: 14 in lawn bowls and two in shooting.

Prior to the Games, Times Colonist sportswriter Cleve Dheensaw identified two athletes as the most likely to win Norfolk Island's first medal: lawn bowler Carmen Anderson in the women's singles event and shooter Milton Bradley in the trap event.

== Medalists ==
Medal	Name	Sport	Event	Date
Bronze	Carmen Anderson	Lawn bowls	Women's singles	27 August

== Lawn bowls ==
Norfolk Island sent 14 lawn bowlers to compete in six lawn bowling events at the Games: men's and women's fours, pairs, and singles. Upon the conclusion of fours pool play on 25 August, the men's team finished with two points in pool B play, placing eighth, or last, in the pool. The women's team recorded six points in pool A play, placing eighth out of ten.

The following day, pairs play concluded. The men's pairs squad totaled six points, finishing seventh out of the nine members in pool B. The women's pairs squad, who finished with two points in pool A, placed ninth, or last, in the pool.

"We only have one club and there are 30 women members. To win a bronze medal here against the best in the world — it's unbelievable."

— Anderson, 27 Augusts

Dan Thornton represented the island in the men's singles event. After the final day of play on 27 August, Thornton finished with four points, placing him seventh in pool A, outside of medal contention.

Carmen Anderson represented the island in the women's singles lawn bowling event. After the end of round-robin play on 27 August, Anderson had seven points, second in pool B behind bowler Rita Jones of Wales. Anderson shared bronze with Norma Shaw of England, who placed second in pool A. The medal marked the first ever medal at the Commonwealth Games for Norfolk Island. In an interview with The Sydney Morning Herald following the medal win, Anderson said "we have already phoned home and everyone on the island knows about it."

== Shooting ==
Two trap shooters, both men, represented the island in two events. On 20 August, Milton Bradley and William Sanders participated in the trap – pairs event. The duo shot a score of 141, placing 18th out of 19th, ahead of the team from Swaziland, who shot an 89. The gold medal winners, Thomas Hewitt and Samuel Allen of Northern Ireland, shot a 188. On 24 and 25 August, Bradley competed in the individual trap event, shooting a score of 94, good for 33rd place out of 40 competitors, which was not enough to advance past the preliminary round. The gold medal winner, Mansher Singh of India, shot a 117 in the preliminary round.

Athlete	Event	Preliminary		Final	
Athlete	Event	Points	Rank	Points	Rank
Milton Bradley	Open trap	94	33	Did not advance	
Milton Bradley; William Sanders	Trap – pairs	—N/a		141	18
