= Papua New Guinea at the 2010 Commonwealth Games =

- CGF code: PNG
- CGA: Papua New Guinea Olympic Committee
- Website: oceaniasport.com/png

in Delhi, India
- Flag bearers: Opening: Closing:
- Medals Ranked 19th: Gold 0 Silver 1 Bronze 0 Total 1

Commonwealth Games appearances (overview)
- 1962; 1966; 1970; 1974; 1978; 1982; 1986; 1990; 1994; 1998; 2002; 2006; 2010; 2014; 2018; 2022; 2026; 2030

Papua New Guinea competed at the 2010 Commonwealth Games held in Delhi, India, from 3 to 14 October 2010. Papua New Guineans was taking part (possibly among other events) in rugby.

The "Queen's Baton" visited Papua New Guinea on 24 April prior to the Games. Governor-General Sir Paulias Matane was the first bearer of the Baton during its stop in the country.

Swimmer Ryan Pini, who had won gold in the 100 metres butterfly at the 2006 Games, reached the final in both the 50m butterfly and the 100m butterfly. He finished fifth in the former; the final of the latter has not yet taken place, but he was described as having "a good chance of retaining the title after cruising through the qualifying rounds".

== Medalists ==
| Medal | Name | Sport | Event | Date |
|---|---|---|---|---|
| Silver | Ryan Pini | Aquatics | Men's 100m Butterfly | October 8 |

== Team Papua New Guinea at the 2010 Commonwealth Games ==
- to be completed

== See also ==
- Papua New Guinea at the 2006 Commonwealth Games
