= Joyce Miller (bowls) =

Scottish international lawn bowler

Personal information
- Nationality: British (Scottish)

Sport
- Sport: Lawn and indoor bowls
- Club: Greenfaulds BC
Medal record
Representing Scotland
Scottish Nationals
Gold medal – first place	2001	singles

Joyce Miller is a former international lawn and indoor bowler from Scotland who competed at the Commonwealth Games.

== Biography ==
Miller was a member of the Greenfaulds Bowls Club and represented Scotland at international level from 1993 to 1997 and again from 2004 to 2009. Miller became a qualified Scottish Bowling Association coach and coached at Greenfaulds from 1987 and was the Dunbartonshire county champion.

Miller represented the Scottish team at the 1998 Commonwealth Games in Kuala Lumpur, Malaysia, where she competed in the fours event, with Betty Forsyth, Sarah Gourlay and Liz Dickson.

She was the singles champion of Scotland at the 2001 Scottish National Bowls Championships and subsequently qualified to represent Scotland at the British Isles Bowls Championships.
