= Scotland at the 1998 Commonwealth Games =

- CG code: SCO
- CGA: Commonwealth Games Scotland
- Website: teamscotland.scot

in Kuala Lumpur, Malaysia
- Flag bearers: Opening: Dougie Walker; Closing: Shirley McIntosh
- Medals Ranked 11th: Gold 3 Silver 2 Bronze 7 Total 12

Commonwealth Games appearances (overview)
- 1930; 1934; 1938; 1950; 1954; 1958; 1962; 1966; 1970; 1974; 1978; 1982; 1986; 1990; 1994; 1998; 2002; 2006; 2010; 2014; 2018; 2022; 2026; 2030

Scotland competed at the 1998 Commonwealth Games in Kuala Lumpur, Malaysia, from 11 September until 21 September 1998.

Scotland came 11th overall in the medal table with 3 gold, 2 silver and 7 bronze medals.

== Medals ==
	(gold)	(silver)	(bronze)	Total
Scotland	3	2	7	12

== Medallists ==
=== Gold ===
- Alex Arthur (boxing)
- Peter Nicol (squash)
- Women's pairs (lawn bowls)

=== Silver ===
- Allison Curbishley (athletics)
- Alison Sheppard (swimming)

=== Bronze ===
- Colin McNeil (boxing)
- Jackie Townsley (boxing)
- Men's doubles (squash)
- Women's doubles (badminton)
- Men's 10m air rifle pairs (shooting)
- Women's 50m three-positions rifle pairs (shooting)
- Women's 50m prone rifle pairs (shooting)

== Team and results ==
=== Athletics ===
Men

Athlete	Events	Club	Medals
Ross Baillie	110m hurdles		
Martin Bell	20 km walk		
Elliot Bunney	100m		
David Cavers	marathon		
Ian Gillespie	5000m		
Grant Graham	800m		
Stephan William Moore Hayward	shot put		
Jamie Quarry	decathlon		
Alexis Sharp	decathlon		
Dougie Walker	200m		
Graham Ross White	50 km walk		
Stephen Whyte	hammer throw		

Women

Athlete	Events	Club	Medals
Allison Curbishley	400m		Silver medal
Lorna Jackson	javelin		
Vikki McPherson	10,000m		
Alison Murray-Jessee	pole vault		
Pauline Richards	heptathlon		
Malgorzata Waldrop	100m		

=== Badminton ===
Men

Athlete	Events	Club	Medals
Bruce Flockhart	singles	Dunfermline	
Alastair Gatt	doubles, mixed	Edinburgh	
David Gilmour	singles	Hamilton	
Russell Hogg	doubles, mixed	Dunfermline	
Jim Mailer	singles	Stirling	
Kenny Middlemiss	doubles, mixed	Edinburgh	
Craig Robertson	doubles, singles	Fauldhouse	

Women

Athlete	Events	Club	Medals
Alexis Blanchflower	doubles, mixed	Glasgow	
Anne Gibson	singles	Dumfries	
Gillian Martin	singles	Brookfield	
Kirsteen McEwan	singles, doubles, mixed	Bridge of Weir	
Elinor Middlemiss	doubles, mixed	Edinburgh	Bronze medal
Fiona Sneddon	singles	Lochgelly	
Sandra Watt	doubles	Innerleithen	Bronze medal

=== Boxing ===
Athlete	Events	Club	Medals
Alex Arthur	57 kg featherweight	Leith Victoria AAC, Edinburgh	Gold medal
Alan Foster	75 kg middleweight		
Colin McNeil	67 kg welterweight	Fauldhouse ABC	Bronze medal
Lee Sharp	63.5 kg light-welterweight		
Jackie Townsley	71 kg light-middleweight	Cleland Miners' ABC, Motherwell	Bronze medal

=== Cricket ===
Squad

- George Salmond (c)
- Mike Allingham
- John Blain
- James Brinkley
- Stephen Crawley
- Alec Davies (wk)
- Nick Dyer
- Douglas Lockhart
- Drew Parsons
- Bruce Patterson
- Keith Sheridan
- Ian Stanger
- Greig Williamson
- Craig Wright

Summary

Team	Event	Group stage				Semifinal	Final / BM	
Team	Event	Opposition Result	Opposition Result	Opposition Result	Rank	Opposition Result	Opposition Result	Rank
Scotland men	Men's tournament	Pakistan; No result	New Zealand; L by 177 runs	Kenya; L by 5 wickets	4	did not advance		13

Group stage

Group D
Pos	Team	Pld	W	L	T	NR	Pts	NRR
1	New Zealand	3	3	0	0	0	6	1.799
2	Pakistan	3	1	1	0	1	3	0.480
3	Kenya	3	1	2	0	0	2	−0.697
4	Scotland	3	0	2	0	1	1	−2.401

Source: ESPNcricinfo

9 September 1998
10:00
Scorecard

Pakistan; 201/5 (50 overs)	v	Scotland; 31/3 (17.2 overs)
Akhtar Sarfraz 66 (61); Mike Allingham 2/46 (10 overs)		Stephen Crawley 12 (52); Shoaib Akhtar 2/7 (5 overs)

No result
Victoria Institution, Kuala Lumpur
Umpires: Nizam Baksh (Can) and Russell Tiffin (Zim)

- Scotland won the toss and elected to field.
- No further play was possible due to rain after 17.2 overs into Scotland's innings.
- Points: Pakistan 1, Scotland 1.

13 September 1998
10:00
Scorecard

New Zealand; 278/6 (50 overs)	v	Scotland; 101 (42.4 overs)
Stephen Fleming 102 (135); James Brinkley 3/55 (10 overs)		George Salmond 31 (73); Chris Harris 4/25 (10 overs)

New Zealand won by 177 runs
Kelab Aman, Kuala Lumpur
Umpires: Beattie Arlow (NI) and Darrell Hair (Aus)

- Scotland won the toss and elected to field.
- Points: New Zealand 2, Scotland 0.
- Scotland were eliminated as a result of this match.

15 September 1998
10:00
Scorecard

Scotland; 156/8 (50 overs)	v	Kenya; 157/5 (37.3 overs)
Bruce Patterson 31 (82); Maurice Odumbe 5/38 (10 overs)		Ravindu Shah 48 (63); Keith Sheridan 2/24 (10 overs)

Kenya won by 5 wickets
Rubber Research Institute Ground, Shah Alam
Umpires: Beattie Arlow (NI) and Steve Bucknor (Jam)

- Scotland won the toss and elected to bat.
- Edward Mboya (Ken) played his final List A match.
- Maurice Odumbe (Ken) took his only List A five-wicket haul.
- Points: Kenya 2, Scotland 0.

=== Cycling ===
Men

Athlete	Events	Club	Medals
James Gladwell	road race, time trial		
Chris Hoy	1 km time trial, sprint		
Craig Maclean	1 km time trial, points, sprint		
James Millar	points		
Richard Moore	road race, time trial		
Brian Smith	road race		
Neil Walker	road race, points		
Drew Wilson	road race		

Women

Athlete	Events	Club	Medals
Zoe Anderson	road race		

=== Gymnastics ===
Men

Athlete	Events	Club	Medals
Barry Collie	all-around, team		
Steve Frew	all-around team		
Jon Mutch	all-around team		

Women

Athlete	Events	Club	Medals
Laura Mackie	rhythmic all-around, team		

=== Lawn bowls ===
Men

Athlete	Events	Club	Medals
George Adrain	fours	Dreghorn BC	
John Aitken	fours	Kirkliston BC	
David Gourlay	pairs	Annbank BC	
Kenny Logan	fours	Kirkliston BC	
Alex Marshall	pairs	Gorgie Mills BC, Edinburgh	
Jim McIntyre	fours	Houldsworth BC	
Willie Wood	singles	Gifford BC	

Women

Athlete	Events	Club	Medals
Liz Dickson	fours	Eyemouth BC	
Julie Forrest	singles	Hawick BC	
Betty Forsyth	fours	Blantyre BC	
Sarah Gourlay	fours	Annbank BC	
Margaret Letham	pairs	Burnbank Hamilton BC	Gold medal
Joyce Lindores	pairs	Ettrick Forest BC	Gold medal
Joyce Miller	fours	Greenfaulds BC	

=== Shooting ===
Men

Athlete	Events	Medals
Richard Grisenthwaite	fullbore rifle, fullbore rifle pair	
Robin Law	air rifle, air rifle pair, 3Pos, 3Pos pair	Bronze medal
David Lewis	air pistol	
Ewen MacColl	trap, trap pair	
David Marello	trap, trap pair	
Ian Marsden	skeet, skeet pair	
Martin Pennington	air pistol	
David Rattray	air rifle, air rifle pair	Bronze medal
Ronald Sellar	3Pos, pair, prone, pair	
Ian Shaw	fullbore rifle, fullbore rifle pair	
Martin Sinclair	prone, prone pair	
Mike Thomson	skeet, skeet pair	

Women

Athlete	Events	Medals
Susan Bell	prone, prone pair	Bronze medal
Patricia Littlechild	air rifle, air rifle pair	
Shirley McIntosh	rifle 3Pos, rifle 3Pos pair, prone, prone pair	,
Janis Thomson	air rifle, air rifle pair, 3Pos, 3Pos pair	Bronze medal

=== Squash ===
Men

Athlete	Events	Club	Medals
Stuart Cowie	singles, doubles, mixed	Bridge of Allan	Bronze medal
David Heath	singles, doubles, mixed	Oban	
Martin Heath	singles, doubles, mixed	Oban	
Peter Nicol	singles, doubles, mixed	Inverurie	,

Women'

Athlete	Events	Club	Medals
Senga Macfie	singles, doubles, mixed	Bridge of Allan	
Claire Waddell	singles, doubles, mixed	Bridge of Allan	

=== Swimming ===
Athlete	Events	Club	Medals
Michael Cole	200 medley		
Ian Edmond	100, 200m breaststroke		
Paul Latimer	100, 200m butterfly, 200 medley		
David Leith	400 free		
Bryan Morgan	50, 100m free		
Graeme Smith	400, 1500m free		
Gregor Tait	100, 200m backstroke		

Women

Athlete	Events	Club	Medals
Diana Borland	200 free, 4x100 free		
Kerry Martin	50m free, 100m butterfly, 4x100 free		
Lymm Mclaren	50m free		
Pauline McLean	4x100 free		
Beverley Robertson	100, 200m breaststroke		
Alison Sheppard	50, 100m free, 4x100 free		Silver medal
Kirsty Thomson	100, 200m backstroke		

=== Tenpin bowling ===
Men

Athlete	Events	Club	Medals
Robert Baird	singles, doubles, mixed		
Robert Birnie	singles, doubles, mixed		

Women

Athlete	Events	Club	Medals
Carol Pirie	singles, doubles, mixed		
Laura Rhoney	singles, doubles, mixed		

=== Weightlifting ===
Athlete	Events	Medals
Martin Boland	69 kg	
Paul Coyle	77 kg	
David Murray	94 kg	
Thomas Neil	105 kg	
Dennis O'Brien	62 kg	
Alan Ogilive	56 kg	
Stuart Yule	94 kg	

== See also ==
- Commonwealth Games Council for Scotland
