= Papua New Guinea at the 2006 Commonwealth Games =

- CG code: PNG
- CGA: Papua New Guinea Olympic Committee
- Website: oceaniasport.com/png

in Melbourne, Australia
- Flag bearers: Opening: Closing:
- Medals: Gold 1 Silver 1 Bronze 0 Total 2

Commonwealth Games appearances (overview)
- 1962; 1966; 1970; 1974; 1978; 1982; 1986; 1990; 1994; 1998; 2002; 2006; 2010; 2014; 2018; 2022; 2026; 2030

Papua New Guinea was represented at the 2006 Commonwealth Games in Melbourne by a 38-member strong contingent comprising a number of sportspersons and officials.

== 2006 Commonwealth Games Medal Count- Medals ==
	(gold)	(silver)	(bronze)	Total
Papua New Guinea	1	1	0	2

== Medalists ==
=== Gold ===
- Ryan Pini, Swimming, Men's 100m Butterfly

=== Silver ===
- Dika Loa Toua, Weightlifting, Women's 53 kg

=== Bronze ===
- none
