= Scotland at the 1994 Commonwealth Games =

- CG code: SCO
- CGA: Commonwealth Games Scotland
- Website: www.teamscotland.scot

in Victoria, Canada
- Flag bearers: Darrin Morris (Opening) (Closing)
- Medals Ranked 7th: Gold 6 Silver 3 Bronze 11 Total 20

Commonwealth Games appearances (overview)
- 1930; 1934; 1938; 1950; 1954; 1958; 1962; 1966; 1970; 1974; 1978; 1982; 1986; 1990; 1994; 1998; 2002; 2006; 2010; 2014; 2018; 2022; 2026; 2030

Scotland competed at the 1994 Commonwealth Games in Victoria, British Columbia, Canada, from 18 to 28 August 1994.

The team was announced on 29 June 1994.

Scotland finished 7th in the medal table with six gold medals, three silver medals and eleven bronze medals.

== Medallists ==
=== Gold ===
- Richard Corsie (lawn bowls)
- Shirley McIntosh (shooting)
- Yvonne Murray (athletics)
- Paul Shepherd (boxing)
- Women's pairs (lawn bowls)

=== Silver ===
- John Wilson (boxing)
- Men's smallbore rifle, three positions pair (shooting)
- Women's smallbore rifle, prone pairs (shooting)

=== Bronze ===
- Alister Allan (shooting)
- Graeme English (wrestling)
- Patricia Littlechild (shooting)
- Calum McNeil (wrestling)
- Geoff Parsons (athletics)
- Joseph Townsley (boxing)
- Fraser Walker (swimming)
- Joanne Walker (gymnastics)
- Men's air rifle pairs (shooting)
- Men's skeet pairs (shooting)

== Team ==
=== Athletics ===
Men

Athlete	Events	Club	Medals
Martin Bell	30km walk		
Gareth Brown	800, 1500		
Elliot Bunney	100		
Kenneth William Campbell	110m hurdles		
James Russell Devine	hammer throw		
Jamie Henderson	100, 4x100m relay		
John MacKenzie	long jump, triple jump		
Ian Mackie	200, 4x100m relay		
Tom McKean	800		
Duncan Mathieson	long jump, 4x100m relay		
Darrin Morris	discus throw		
Geoff Parsons	high jump		Bronze medal
Jamie Quarry	decathlon		
Chris Robison	10,000		
John Ian Sherban	10,000		
David Strang	800, 1500		
Douglas Walker	200, 4x100m relay		
Brian Whittle	400		
Stephen Anthony Whyte	hammer throw, shot put		

Women

Athlete	Events	Club	Medals
Laura Margaret Adam	3,000m		
Karen Costello	javelin throw		
Alison Grey	discus throw, shot put		
Lynn Harding	marathon		
Ruth Irving	long jump		
Emma Lindsay	heptathlon		
Jane Low	400m hurdles		
Karen MacLeod	marathon		
Vikki McPherson	10,000m		
Hazel Melvin	high jump		
Yvonne Murray	3,000, 10,000m		Gold medal
Melanie Neef	400m		
Verity Snook-Larby	10km walk		

=== Badminton ===
Men

Athlete	Events	Club	Medals
Bruce Flockhart	singles, doubles, mixed	Dunfermline	
Gordon Haldane	doubles, mixed	Kirkcaldy	
Russell Hogg	doubles, mixed	Dunfermline	
Kenny Middlemiss	doubles, mixed	Edinburgh	

Women

Athlete	Events	Club	Medals
Elinor Allen	doubles, mixed	Edinburgh	
Jenny Allen	singles, doubles	Edinburgh	
Anne Gibson	singles, mixed	Dumfries	
Jillian Haldane	mixed	Kirkcaldy	
Aileen Travers	singles, mixed	Perth	

=== Boxing ===
Athlete	Events	Club	Medals
Brian Carr	57kg featherweight		
James Coyle	60kg lightweight		
Ronnie McPhee	54kg bantamweight		
Lee Munro	-48kg light-flyweight		
James Pender	63.5kg light-welterweight		
Paul Shepherd	51kg flyweight	Sparta ABC, Edinburgh	Gold medal
Joe Townsley	71kg light-middleweight	Cleland Miners' ABC	Bronze medal
John Wilson	81kg light-heavyweight	Sparta ABC, Edinburgh	Silver medal
Alan Wolecki	67kg welterweight		

=== Cycling ===
Men

Athlete	Events	Club	Medals
Stewart Brydon	scratch,		
Graeme Herd	scratch, points		
Kenneth Riddle	road race		
Roddy Riddle	road race, points		
Anthony Stirrat	scratch, time trial points		
Andrew Wilson	road race		
Andrew Young	road race		

Women

Athlete	Events	Club	Medals
Sarah Phillips	road race, pursuit, points		

=== Gymnastics ===
Men

Athlete	Events	Medals
Steve Frew	all-around, horizontal pommel	

Women

Athlete	Events	Medals
Gayle Gosden	rhythmic team	
Lynsey Johnston	rhythmic all-around, team	
Sinead Lyons	all-around	
Joanne Walker	rhythmic all-around, clubs, hoop, ribbon	Bronze medal

=== Lawn bowls ===
Men

Athlete	Events	Club	Medals
Richard Corsie	singles	Craigentinny BC, Edinburgh	Gold medal
Billy Hay	fours	Oban BC	
Garry Hood	fours	Mauchline BC	
Ian Laird	fours	Insch BC	
Alex Marshall	pairs	Gorgie Mills BC, Edinburgh	
Graham Robertson	pairs	Tranent BC	
Willie Wood	fours	Gifford BC	

Women

Athlete	Events	Club	Medals
Dorothy Barr	fours	Forehill BC, Ayr	Bronze medal
Elizabeth Dickson	fours	Eyemouth BC	Bronze medal
Betty Forsyth	fours	Blantyre BC	Bronze medal
Sarah Gourlay	pairs	Annbank BC	Gold medal
Joyce Lindores	singles	Ettrick Forest BC	
Janice Maxwell	fours	Castle Douglas BC	Bronze medal
Frances Whyte	pairs	Priorscroft BC	Gold medal

=== Shooting ===
Men

Athlete	Events	Medals
Alister Allan	air rifle, pair, prone, pair, rifle 3pos, pair	,
Mike Baillie-Hamilton	fullbore rifle, fullbore pair	
James Cairns	centre fire, pair, rapid fire	
Hugh Hunter	centre fire, centre fire pair, rapid fire	
Robin Law	air rifle, air rifle pair	Bronze medal
Ewen MacColl	trap, trap pair	
Ian Marsden	skeet, skeet pair	Bronze medal
Bill Murray	rifle 3Pos, rifle 3Pos pair	Silver medal
John Oliphant	prone, prone pair	
Gary Peacock	trap, trap pair	
Lindsay Peden	fullbore rifle, fullbore pair	
David Rattray	air rifle, pair	Bronze medal
Mike Thomson	skeet, skeet pair	Bronze medal

Women

Athlete	Events	Medals
Patricia Littlechild	rifle 3Pos, pair, prone, prone pair	,
Shirley McIntosh	rifle 3Pos, pair, prone, prone pair	,

=== Swimming ===
Men

Athlete	Events	Club	Medals
Andrew Aitken	100, 200m backstroke, 200 free		
Neil Hudghton	100, 200m breaststroke		
Jonathan Hunter	100, 200m backstroke, 50m free		
Jonathan Kerr	200 backstroke, 200, 400 medley		
Graeme Smith	400, 1500m free		
Euan Stewart	100 breaststroke, 100 butterfly, 50, 100 free		
Fraser Walker	200 medley		Bronze medal

Women

Athlete	Events	Club	Medals
Jill Ewing	100m backstroke, 100m butterfly		
Angela Pendrich	100, 200 free, 200 butterfly		
Alison Sheppard	50, 100m free		

=== Synchronised swimming ===
Athlete	Events	Club	Medals
Sarah Burgon	solo, duet	Edinburgh SSC	
Jane Liston	duet	Edinburgh SSC	

=== Weightlifting ===
Athlete	Events	Club	Medals
Raymond Cavanagh	76kg		
Charles Hamilton	83kg		
David Leverage	64kg		
John McEwan	83kg		
Charles Murray	99kg		
Thomas Neil	99kg		
James Owens	76kg		

=== Wrestling ===
Athlete	Events	Medals
James Breen	62kg featherweight	
David Connelly	52kg flyweight	
Graeme English	90kg light-heavyweight	Bronze medal
Calum McNeil	74kg welterweight	Bronze medal
Gregor McNeil	68kg lightweight	
Paul Nedley	57kg bantamweight	
Douglas Thomson	+100kg super-heavyweight	
Thomas Watson	82kg middleweight	
