= Dorothy Barr =

Scottish international lawn bowler

Personal information
- Nationality: British (Scottish)

Sport
- Sport: Lawn and indoor bowls
- Club: Ayr Forehill BC
Medal record
Representing Scotland
Commonwealth Games
Bronze medal – third place	1994 Victoria	Women's Fours

Dorothy Barr is a former international lawn bowler from Scotland who competed at the Commonwealth Games.

== Biography ==
Barr represented the Scottish team at the 1994 Commonwealth Games in Victoria, Canada, where she competed in the fours event. At the Games, she won a bronze medal with Betty Forsyth, Elizabeth Dickson and Janice Maxwell.
