= Antony James =

British swimmer (born 1989)

Personal information
- Full name: Antony John James
- National team: Great Britain
- Born: 5 November 1989 (age 36) Plymouth, England
- Height: 1.80 m (5 ft 11 in)
- Weight: 85 kg (187 lb; 13.4 st)

Sport
- Sport: Swimming
- Strokes: Butterfly

Antony John James (born 5 November 1989) is a convicted rapist, former English competitive swimmer. He represented Great Britain in the Olympics, the FINA World Aquatics Championships and the European Championships, and England in the Commonwealth Games where he won silver in 2010 in Delhi in the 100 metres butterfly. At the 2012 Summer Olympics in London, he competed in the men's 100-metre butterfly. Alongside swimming he has completed a BSc in Psychology at Plymouth University.

In September 2024, James went on trial for 16 sexual offences including the alleged rape of two teenage girls between 2012 and 2022; he denied all charges. On 16 October, James was found guilty of raping both girls, as well as "sexually touching" one when she was under 16, and soliciting sexually explicit pictures from the other when she was also under 16. He was found not guilty of two further image-related offences and of one charge of controlling behaviour, with the jury unable to reach a verdict on six separate charges. On 26 February 2025, James was sentenced to prison for 21 years, and placed on the sex offenders' registry for life.

== International results ==
Year	Competition	Event	Result	Time
2009	European Short Course Championships	50 m Butterfly	12th	23.08
2009	European Short Course Championships	100 m Butterfly	7th	50.66
2010	European Championships	50 m Butterfly	17th	24.38
2010	European Championships	100 m Butterfly	8th	52.67
2010	European Championships	4 x 100 m Medley Relay	4th	3:35.74
2010	Commonwealth Games	50 m Butterfly	8th	24.63
2010	Commonwealth Games	100 m Butterfly	2nd	52.50
2010	Commonwealth Games	4 x 100 m Medley Relay	3rd	3:36.31
2011	European Short Course Championships	100 m Butterfly	15th	52.32
2011	European Short Course Championships	100 m Individual Medley	33rd	56.62
2011	European Short Course Championships	4 x 50 m Freestyle Relay	7th	1:28.28
2011	European Short Course Championships	4 x 50 m Medley Relay	5th	1:35.07
2011	World Championships	50 m Butterfly	15th	23.74
2011	World Championships	100 m Butterfly	19th	52.68
2012	Olympic Games	100 m Butterfly	31st	53.25
