= Ann Muir =

New Zealand lawn bowler (born 1946)

Ann Muir QSM
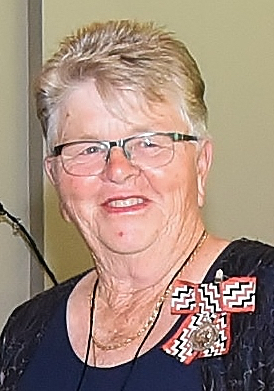
- Muir in 2017

Personal information
- Full name: Ann Shirley Muir
- Born: 24 July 1946 (age 80) Auckland, New Zealand
- Height: 1.60 m (5 ft 3 in)

Sport
- Country: New Zealand
- Sport: Lawn bowls
- Club: Kensington Bowling Club
Medal record
Women's lawn bowls
Representing New Zealand
Commonwealth Games
Bronze medal – third place	1994 Victoria	Women's fours
Asia Pacific Bowls Championships
Bronze medal – third place	1993 Victoria	Fours

Ann Shirley Muir QSM (born 24 July 1946) is a New Zealand international lawn bowls player and administrator.

== Bowls career ==
Muir won a fours bronze medal at the Asia Pacific Bowls Championships.

Muir competed at the 1994 Commonwealth Games in the women's fours, where she won the bronze medal along with her teammates Adrienne Lambert, Colleen Ferrick and Marlene Castle.

Muir won the 2013/14 pairs title and the 2005 fours title at the New Zealand National Bowls Championships when bowling for the Kensington Bowls Club.

== Honours ==
A former president of Bowls New Zealand, and Bowls New Zealand Coach of the Year in 2016, Muir was awarded the Queen's Service Medal, for services to bowls and the community, in the 2017 Queen's Birthday Honours.
