= Adrienne Lambert =

New Zealand lawn bowler

Personal information
- Born: Adrienne Marie Parker; 1938 or 1939 (age 87–88)

Sport
- Country: New Zealand
- Sport: Lawn bowls
- Club: Matamata Bowling CLub
Medal record
Representing New Zealand
World Outdoor Championships
Silver medal – second place	1992 Ayr	triples
Silver medal – second place	1992 Ayr	fours
Bronze medal – third place	1992 Ayr	team
Commonwealth Games
Silver medal – second place	1990 Auckland	fours
Bronze medal – third place	1994 Victoria	fours
Asia Pacific Bowls Championships
Silver medal – second place	1989 Suva	triples
Gold medal – first place	1989 Suva	fours
Silver medal – second place	1991 Kowloon	fours
Silver medal – second place	1993 Victoria	triples
Bronze medal – third place	1993 Victoria	fours

Adrienne Marie Lambert (née Parker; born 1938 or 1939) is a former international lawn bowler from New Zealand.

== Bowls career ==
Lambert won a gold and silver medals at the 1989 Asia Pacific Bowls Championships, in Suva, Fiji. She went on to win three more medals at further Championships.

The following year she won a silver medal in the women's fours with Lyn McLean, Marlene Castle and Rhoda Ryan at the 1990 Commonwealth Games in Auckland.

Four years later she won a bronze medal in the women's fours with Ann Muir, Colleen Ferrick and Marlene Castle at the 1994 Commonwealth Games in Victoria, British Columbia.

In between the Games, Lambert won double silver in the triples and fours at the 1992 World Outdoor Bowls Championship in Ayr.

In addition Lambert has won the 1988 pairs title and the 1981, 1989, 1990 and 1991 fours title at the New Zealand National Bowls Championships when bowling for the Matamata Bowls Club.

She was the manager of the New Zealand women's team from 1996 until 2000.
