= Colleen Ferrick =

New Zealand lawn bowler

Personal information
- Nationality: New Zealander
- Born: 1942 (age 83–84)

Sport
- Club: Taradale
Medal record
Representing New Zealand
Commonwealth Games
Bronze medal – third place	1994 Victoria	Women's fours
Asia Pacific Bowls Championships
Silver medal – second place	1993 Victoria	triples
Bronze medal – third place	1993 Victoria	fours

Colleen Ferrick is a former New Zealand international lawn bowler.

== Bowls career ==
Ferrick won two medals at the 1993 Asia Pacific Bowls Championships in the 1993 triples and fours.

She won a bronze medal in the Women's fours at the 1994 Commonwealth Games in Victoria with Adrienne Lambert, Ann Muir and Marlene Castle.

She joined the Heretaunga Ladies Bowling Club in 1979 and later became the President at Heretaunga and Hawke's Bay. She has won one national title and 42 senior club titles.
