= Anna Pretorius =

Personal information
- Nationality: South Africa
Medal record
Representing South Africa
Commonwealth Games
Gold medal – first place	1994 Victoria	Women's fours

Anna Pretorius is a South African former international lawn bowler.

Pretorius won a gold medal in the Women's fours at the 1994 Commonwealth Games in Victoria with Colleen Grondein, Lorna Trigwell and Hester Bekker. It was the first time that South Africa had won a gold medal since 1958, following the return from their Anti-Apartheid Movement Commonwealth ban enforced in 1961.

Her daughter Linda Ralph won a New Zealand bowls national title after emigrating to that country.
