= Lorna Trigwell =

South African international lawn bowler

Personal information
- Nationality: South African / Scottish
- Born: 1 February 1954 (age 72)

Sport
- Sport: lawn bowls
- Club: Linlithgow BC
Medal record
Representing South Africa
Commonwealth Games
Gold medal – first place	1994 Victoria	Women's fours
Gold medal – first place	1998 Kuala Lumpur	Women's fours
Bronze medal – third place	2002 Manchester	Women's singles
Bronze medal – third place	2006 Melbourne	Women's singles
World Outdoor Championships
Silver medal – second place	1996 Leamington Spa	Women's fours
Gold medal – first place	1996 Leamington Spa	Women's team
Bronze medal – third place	2000 Johannesburg	Women's triples
Silver medal – second place	2004 Leamington Spa	Women's singles
Gold medal – first place	2008 Christchurch	Women's triples
Atlantic Bowls Championships
Gold medal – first place	1995 Durban	pairs
Silver medal – second place	1995 Durban	fours
Gold medal – first place	1997 Llandrindod Wells	fours
Gold medal – first place	1999 Cape Town	fours
Silver medal – second place	2007 Ayr	fours
Representing Scotland
Atlantic Bowls Championships
Gold medal – first place	2011 Paphos	triples
Bronze medal – third place	2015 Paphos	triples
British Isles Championships
Gold medal – first place	2013	singles

Lorna Marie-Therese Trigwell, married name Lorna Smith, is a South African international lawn bowler. She is regarded as one of the leading players in the world after winning multiple medals.

== Bowls career ==
=== Commonwealth Games ===
Trigwell has won four Commonwealth Games medals at consecutive games. In 1994, she won a gold medal in the Women's fours at the 1994 Commonwealth Games in Victoria with Anna Pretorius, Colleen Grondein and Hester Bekker. It was the first time that South Africa had won a gold medal since 1958, following the return from their Anti-Apartheid Movement Commonwealth ban enforced in 1961.

Four years later she repeated the feat in Kuala Lumpur when winning gold with Hester Bekker, Loraine Victor, and Trish Steyn at the Women's fours. She then won consecutive singles bronze medals at the 2002 Commonwealth Games and the 2006 Commonwealth Games.

=== World Outdoor Championships ===
She has won three World Outdoor Championship medals at consecutive championships. After three bronze medals and a silver medal a fourth gold arrived in 2008, when she won the triples by winning the Women's Triples at the 2008 World Outdoor Bowls Championship in Christchurch.

=== Atlantic Championships ===
In 1995 she won the pairs gold medal (with Jo Peacock and the fours silver medal at the Atlantic Bowls Championships. Two years later she won fours gold at Llandrindod Wells and in Cape Town in 1999 she repreated the fours gold success. A fifth medal was won in 1997 when winning a silver in the fours.

In 2011 under her married name of Lorna Smith and bowling for Scotland she won the triples gold medal at the Championships and in 2015 she won the triples bronze medal bringing her total to seven medal of which four were gold.

=== Scotland ===
In 2008 she emigrated to Scotland and took up residence there. From 2012-2014 she set a Scottish record of three consecutive Scottish National Bowls Championships, bowling for the Linlithgow Bowling Club. Controversy followed after the 2012 success because she was then overlooked by the Scottish selectors for the 2012 World Outdoor Bowls Championship and as a consequence made herself unavailable for the 2014 Commonwealth Games.
