= Janice Maxwell =

Scottish lawn bowler

Personal information
- Nationality: British (Scottish)
- Born: 1 December 1946

Sport
- Club: Castle Douglas BC
Medal record
Representing Scotland
World Outdoor Championships
Gold medal – first place	1992 Ayr	triples
Gold medal – first place	1992 Ayr	fours
Gold medal – first place	1992 Ayr	team
Commonwealth Games
Bronze medal – third place	1994 Victoria	fours
Atlantic Bowls Championships
Gold medal – first place	1993 Florida	fours
Bronze medal – third place	1997 Llandrindod Wells	fours

Janice H. Maxwell (born 1 December 1946) is a former Scottish International and triple World Bowls gold medal winning lawn bowler.

== Bowls career ==
Watson represented the Scottish team at the 1990 Commonwealth Games in Auckland, New Zealand, where she competed in the fours event, with Ann Watson, Joyce Lindores and Annette Evans. At the time of the Games she was an auxiliary nurse.

In 1992 she won a gold medal in both the triples and the fours at the 1992 World Outdoor Bowls Championship in Ayr. She also won a bronze medal in the fours at the 1994 Commonwealth Games in Victoria with Betty Forsyth, Elizabeth Dickson and Dorothy Barr.

In 1993 she won the fours gold medal at the inaugural Atlantic Bowls Championships and four years later won a fours bronze at the Championships.

She also won the Scottish National Bowls Championships singles title in 1986 bowling for Castle Douglas, beating Annette Evans of Willow Bank BC 21-19 in the final, played at Stewarton BC.

In 2014, Janice set a record for her club by winning her 25th championship for Castle Douglas.
