= Stephen Adamson =

Northern Irish international lawn bowler

Personal information
- Nationality: British (Northern Irish)
- Born: c.1965

Sport
- Sport: Lawn and indoor bowls
- Club: Dunbarton BC
Medal record
Representing Ireland
World Outdoor Championships
Silver medal – second place	1992 Worthing	pairs
Representing Northern Ireland
Commonwealth Games
Bronze medal – third place	1994 Victoria	pairs

Stephen Adamson (born c.1965) is an Irish international lawn and indoor bowler.

== Biography ==
He won a silver medal in the pairs at the 1992 World Outdoor Bowls Championship in Worthing.

Adamson represented the Northern Irish team at the 1994 Commonwealth Games in Victoria, Canada. He competed in the pairs event, with Sammy Allen and won a bronze medal.

In addition to his international success he also won the 1990 Irish National Bowls Championships singles.
