= Robert Ball (bowls) =

Australian lawn bowler

Personal information
- Nationality: Australia
- Born: July 17, 1956 (age 69)
Medal record
Representing (Australia)
Commonwealth Games
Silver medal – second place	1994 Victoria	fours

Robert Ball (born July 17, 1956) is a former Australian international lawn bowler.

He won a silver medal in the fours with Ian Taylor, Stephen Anderson and Steve Srhoy at the 1994 Commonwealth Games in Victoria.
