= Bruce McNish =

Sport
- Country: New Zealand
- Sport: Lawn bowls
- Club: Greymouth, Musgrave Hill
Medal record
Representing New Zealand
Commonwealth Games
Bronze medal – third place	1994 Victoria	fours

Bruce McNish is a former New Zealand international lawn bowler.

== Bowls career ==
McNish won a bronze medal at the 1994 Commonwealth Games in the fours event in Victoria, British Columbia, Canada with Stewart Buttar, Peter Belliss and Rowan Brassey.

He won the 1994 pairs title and the 1983, 1988, 1993, 1994 and 2008 fours titles at the New Zealand National Bowls Championships bowling for various clubs.
