= Ian Taylor (bowls) =

Australian bowls player

Personal information
- Nationality: Australia
- Born: 19 November 1957
Medal record
Representing (Australia)
World Outdoor Championships
Bronze medal – third place	1996 Adelaide	triples
Bronze medal – third place	1996 Adelaide	fours
Commonwealth Games
Silver medal – second place	1994 Victoria	fours

Ian Taylor (born 1957) is a former Australian international lawn and indoor bowler.

In the 1996 World Outdoor Bowls Championship he won two bronze medals in the triples and fours.

He also won a silver medal in the fours with Stephen Anderson, Robert Ball and Steve Srhoy at the 1994 Commonwealth Games in Victoria.
