= Swimming at the 2010 Commonwealth Games – Men's 100 metre butterfly =

Men's 100 metre butterfly at the 2010 Commonwealth Games
- Venue: SPM Swimming Pool Complex
- Dates: 7 October 2010 (heats & semis); 8 October 2010 (final)
- Competitors: 35 from 22 nations
- Winning time: 51.69

Medalists
gold medal	Geoff Huegill	Australia
silver medal	Ryan Pini	Papua New Guinea
silver medal	Antony James	England

The Men's 100 metre butterfly event at the 2010 Commonwealth Games took place on 7 and 8 October 2010, at the SPM Swimming Pool Complex. Ryan Pini of Papua New Guinea was the defending champion, and was in Delhi to defend his title, appearing as one of his country's best hopes for a medal.

Five heats were held, with most containing the maximum number of swimmers (eight). The top sixteen advanced to the semifinals and the top eight from there qualified for the finals.

== Records ==
Prior to this competition, the existing world and Commonwealth Games records were as follows.

World record	Michael Phelps (USA)	49.82	Rome, Italy	1 August 2009
Commonwealth record				
Games record	Geoff Huegill (AUS)	52.36	Manchester, United Kingdom	30 July 2002

The following records were established during the competition:

Date	Event	Name	Nationality	Time	Record
8 October	Final	Geoff Huegill	Australia	51.69	CG

== Results ==
=== Heats ===
The heats began at 8:30am.

Rank	Heat	Lane	Name	Nationality	Time	Notes
1	3	4	Geoff Huegill	Australia	52.87	Q
2	4	5	Chris Wright	Australia	53.89	Q
3	3	6	Andrew Mayor	Scotland	53.94	Q
4	5	3	Ryan Pini	Papua New Guinea	54.17	Q
5	3	5	Antony James	England	54.19	Q
6	3	2	Shaune Fraser	Cayman Islands	54.38	Q
7	5	5	Michael Rock	England	54.42	Q
8	4	2	Stefan Hirniak	Canada	54.51	Q
9	4	3	Moss Burmester	New Zealand	54.69	Q
10	5	4	Jason Dunford	Kenya	54.85	Q
11	5	2	Ian Powell	Guernsey	55.04	Q
12	5	6	Daniel Bego	Malaysia	55.13	Q
13	3	7	Virdhawal Khade	India	55.17	Q
14	5	7	Cadell Lyons	Trinidad and Tobago	55.86	Q
15	4	7	Cameron Brodie	Scotland	56.20	Q
16	4	8	Jarryd Gregoire	Trinidad and Tobago	56.55	Q
17	4	6	Chad le Clos	South Africa	56.56	
18	5	1	Joshua Mc Leod	Trinidad and Tobago	56.68	
19	3	1	Dzulhaili Kamal	Singapore	56.82	
20	1	3	Arjun Muralidharan	India	57.24	
21	4	1	Conor Leaney	Northern Ireland	58.11	
22	5	8	Arren Quek	Singapore	58.50	
23	2	5	Ben Lowndes	Guernsey	59.41	
24	2	4	Luke Hall	Swaziland	59.44	
25	2	3	Ian Hubert	Guernsey	59.61	
26	3	8	Conrad Francis	Sri Lanka	1:00.22	
27	2	7	James Sanderson	Gibraltar	1:01.42	
28	2	2	Colin Bensadon	Gibraltar	1:01.57	
29	1	5	Akmal Khan	Samoa	1:02.21	
30	2	6	Shane Mangroo	Seychelles	1:03.66	
31	2	1	Peter Pokawin	Papua New Guinea	1:04.57	
32	2	8	Milimo Mweetwa	Zambia	1:04.97	
33	1	4	Mujahid Mohamed	Maldives	1:37.41	
	3	3	Darian Townsend	South Africa		DNS
	4	4	Andrew Lauterstein	Australia		DNS

=== Semifinals ===
The semifinals began at 5:14 pm.

Rank	Heat	Lane	Name	Nationality	Time	Notes
1	1	2	Jason Dunford	Kenya	52.39	Q
2	2	4	Geoff Huegill	Australia	52.53	Q
3	1	4	Chris Wright	Australia	53.04	Q
4	2	3	Antony James	England	53.08	Q
5	1	5	Ryan Pini	Papua New Guinea	53.12	Q
6	1	6	Stefan Hirniak	Canada	53.85	Q
7	1	3	Shaune Fraser	Cayman Islands	53.88	Q
8	2	5	Andrew Mayor	Scotland	54.31	Q
9	2	1	Virdhawal Khade	India	54.34	
10	2	2	Moss Burmester	New Zealand	54.43	
11	1	7	Daniel Bego	Malaysia	54.77	
12	2	6	Michael Rock	England	55.20	
13	2	7	Ian Powell	Guernsey	55.24	
14	2	8	Cameron Brodie	Scotland	55.39	
15	1	8	Jarryd Gregoire	Trinidad and Tobago	56.53	
16	1	1	Cadell Lyons	Trinidad and Tobago	56.73	

=== Final ===
The final took place on 8 October at 4:00 pm.

Rank	Lane	Name	Nationality	Time	Notes
1st place, gold medalist(s)	5	Geoff Huegill	Australia	51.69	CG
= (silver)	2	Ryan Pini	Papua New Guinea	52.50	
= (silver)	6	Antony James	England	52.50	
=4	3	Chris Wright	Australia	52.66	
=4	4	Jason Dunford	Kenya	52.66	
6	7	Stefan Hirniak	Canada	53.83	
7	8	Andrew Mayor	Scotland	53.85	
8	1	Shaune Fraser	Cayman Islands	54.03	
