= Colleen Grondein =

South African international lawn bowler

Personal information
- Nationality: South African

Sport
- Club: Lahee Park
Medal record
Representing South Africa
Commonwealth Games
Gold medal – first place	1994 Victoria	Women's fours
Atlantic Bowls Championships
Gold medal – first place	1995 Durban	triples
Silver medal – second place	1995 Durban	fours

Colleen Grondein is a former South African international lawn bowler.

== Bowls career ==
Grondein won a gold medal in the Women's fours at the 1994 Commonwealth Games in Victoria with Anna Pretorius, Lorna Trigwell and Hester Bekker. It was the first time that South Africa had won a gold medal since 1958, following the return from their Anti-Apartheid Movement Commonwealth ban enforced in 1961.

In 1995 she won the triples gold medal and fours silver medal at the Atlantic Bowls Championships in her home country.

She bowls for the Lahee Park Bowling Club.
