= Steve Srhoy =

Australian lawn bowler and coach

Personal information
- Nationality: Australian
- Born: 21 January 1940
Medal record
Representing (Australia)
Commonwealth Games
Silver medal – second place	1994 Victoria	fours
Asia Pacific Bowls Championships
Silver medal – second place	1993 Victoria	pairs
Gold medal – first place	1993 Victoria	fours

Stipan 'Steve' Srhoy (born 1940) is a former Australian international lawn bowler and coach.

== Bowls career ==
He won a silver medal in the fours with Ian Taylor, Robert Ball and Stephen Anderson at the 1994 Commonwealth Games in Victoria.

He coached the 2002 Commonwealth Games Australian bowls team.

He won two medals at the 1993 Asia Pacific Bowls Championships including a gold medal in the fours, in Victoria, Canada.
