= Stephen Anderson (bowls) =

Australian lawn bowler (born 1958)

Personal information
- Nationality: Australian
- Born: 30 January 1958 (age 68)
Medal record
Representing (Australia)
World Outdoor Championships
Bronze medal – third place	1996 Adelaide	triples
Bronze medal – third place	1996 Adelaide	fours
Commonwealth Games
Silver medal – second place	1994 Victoria	fours
Asia Pacific Bowls Championships
Gold medal – first place	1993 Victoria	triples
Gold medal – first place	1993 Victoria	fours
Silver medal – second place	1995 Dunedin	triples
Bronze medal – third place	1995 Dunedin	fours

Stephen Anderson (born 30 January 1958) is an Australian former international lawn bowler.

== Bowls career ==
In the 1996 World Outdoor Bowls Championship he won two bronze medals in the triples and fours.

He also won a silver medal in the fours with Ian Taylor, Robert Ball and Steve Srhoy at the 1994 Commonwealth Games in Victoria.

Anderson won four medals at the 1993 and 1995 Asia Pacific Bowls Championships including double gold in the triples and fours, in Victoria, Canada.
