= Elizabeth Dickson (bowls) =

Scottish lawn bowler (died 2022)

Personal information
- Nationality: British (Scottish)
- Died: 2022

Sport
- Sport: Lawn and indoor bowls
- Club: Eyemouth BC
Medal record
Representing Scotland
Commonwealth Games
Bronze medal – third place	1994 Victoria	fours
Atlantic Bowls Championships
Gold medal – first place	1995 Durban	fours

Elizabeth "Liz" Dickson (died 2022) was a Scottish international lawn bowler.

== Biography ==
Dickson represented Scotland for 25 years at BIWBC Senior International level from 1998 to 2012. Dickson was a member of the Eyemouth BC. In 1994, she was selected by Scotland for the fours event at the 1994 Commonwealth Games in Victoria, British Columbia, Canada and won a bronze medal with Betty Forsyth, Janice Maxwell and Dorothy Barr.

In 1995 she won the fours gold medal at the Atlantic Bowls Championships.

Dickson represented the Scottish team again at the 1998 Commonwealth Games in Kuala Lumpur, Malaysia, where she competed in the fours event, with Betty Forsyth, Sarah Gourlay and Joyce Miller.

Dickson died in 2022.
