= Lyn Dwyer =

Personal information
- Nationality: South African
Medal record
Representing South Africa
Commonwealth Games
Silver medal – second place	1994 Victoria	Women's pairs
Atlantic Bowls Championships
Gold medal – first place	1995 Durban	triples
Silver medal – second place	1995 Durban	fours

Lyn Dwyer is a former South African international lawn bowler.

== Bowls career ==
Dwyer won a silver medal in the Women's pairs at the 1994 Commonwealth Games in Victoria with Jo Peacock.

In 1995 she won the triples gold medal and fours silver medal at the Atlantic Bowls Championships.
