= Stewart Buttar =

New Zealandian lawn bowler (1954–2006)

Personal information
- Born: 1954 Dunedin, New Zealand
- Died: 2 March 2006 (aged 51–52)

Sport
- Country: New Zealand
- Sport: Lawn bowls
- Club: Burnside
Medal record
Men's lawn bowls
Representing New Zealand
Commonwealth Games
Bronze medal – third place	1994 Victoria	Fours

Stewart Buttar (1954 – 2 March 2006) was a New Zealand international lawn bowler and national coach.

== Bowls career ==
Buttar won a bronze medal at the 1994 Commonwealth Games in the fours event in Victoria, British Columbia, Canada with Bruce McNish, Peter Belliss and Rowan Brassey.

He was a New Zealand National Bowls Championships champion, a feat matched by his son Nick Buttar. In all Buttar won three National titles; the singles in 1994 and the pairs in 1993 & 1994.

== Coaching ==
Stewart Buttar later became the national coach of the New Zealand team but died in 2006 from cancer.
