= Jo Peacock =

Personal information
- Nationality: South African
Medal record
Representing South Africa
World Outdoor Championships
Gold medal – first place	1996 Leamington Spa	Women's team
Commonwealth Games
Silver medal – second place	1994 Victoria	Women's pairs
Atlantic Bowls Championships
Gold medal – first place	1995 Durban	singles
Gold medal – first place	1995 Durban	pairs

Jo Peacock is a former South African international lawn bowler.

== Bowls career ==
Peacock won a silver medal in the Women's pairs at the 1994 Commonwealth Games in Victoria with Lyn Dwyer.

In 1995 she won the singles and pairs gold medals at the Atlantic Bowls Championships, the latter partnering Lorna Trigwell.
