= Neil Burkett =

South African lawn and indoor bowler

Personal information
- Full name: Neil Anthony Burkett
- Nationality: South African
- Born: 16 March 1948 (age 78)
Medal record
Representing South Africa
World Outdoor Championships
Bronze medal – third place	1992 Worthing	fours
Silver medal – second place	2000 Johannesburg	fours
Commonwealth Games
Gold medal – first place	1994 Victoria	fours
Bronze medal – third place	1998 Kuala Lumpur	fours
Silver medal – second place	2002 Manchester	fours
Bronze medal – third place	2006 Melbourne	triples

Neil Anthony Burkett (born 16 March 1948) is a South African international lawn and indoor bowler.

== Bowls career ==
Burkett won two World Bowls Championship medals; a fours bronze at the 1992 World Outdoor Bowls Championship in Worthing and a silver medal in the fours at the 2000 World Outdoor Bowls Championship in Johannesburg.

He has also won four Commonwealth Games medals including a gold medal in the fours at the 1994 Commonwealth Games in Victoria with Alan Lofthouse, Donald Piketh and Robert Rayfield.

In 1996, he won the Hong Kong International Bowls Classic pairs title with Gerry Baker.
