= Robert Rayfield =

South African bowls player (1944–2021)

Robbie Rayfield
Personal information
- Nationality: South African
- Born: 1944
- Died: March 2021 (aged 77)
Medal record
Representing South Africa
World Outdoor Championships
Silver medal – second place	1992 Worthing	triples
Bronze medal – third place	1992 Worthing	fours
Commonwealth Games
Gold medal – first place	1994 Victoria	fours
Bronze medal – third place	1998 Kuala Lumpur	fours

Robert Rayfield (1944-2021) known as Robbie Rayfield was a South African international lawn and indoor bowler.

He won the triples silver medal and fours bronze medal at the 1992 World Outdoor Bowls Championship in Worthing.

He won a gold medal in the fours at the 1994 Commonwealth Games in Victoria with Alan Lofthouse, Donald Piketh and Neil Burkett and four years later won a bronze medal in the fours at the 1998 Commonwealth Games in Kuala Lumpur with Burkett, Bruce Makkink and Mike Redshaw.
