= Alan Lofthouse =

Personal information
- Nationality: South Africa
Medal record
Lawn bowls
Representing South Africa
Commonwealth Games
Gold medal – first place	1994 Victoria	fours

Alan Lofthouse is a former South African international lawn and indoor bowler.

He won a gold medal in the fours at the 1994 Commonwealth Games in Victoria with Robert Rayfield, Donald Piketh and Neil Burkett.

In November 2014, Alan Lofthouse and Geoff Perrow won the Western Province pairs.
