= Wena Piande =

PNG international lawn bowler

Personal information
- Nationality: Papua New Guinea
Medal record
Representing Papua New Guinea
Commonwealth Games
Silver medal – second place	1994 Victoria	Women's fours

Wena Piande is a former Papua New Guinea international lawn bowler.

Piande won a silver medal in the Women's fours at the 1994 Commonwealth Games in Victoria with Elizabeth Bure, Linda Ahmat and Cunera Monalua.
