= Linda Ahmat =

Papua New Guinea lawn bowler (born 1952)

Personal information
- Nationality: Papua New Guinea
- Born: 23 September 1952 (age 73)
Medal record
Representing Papua New Guinea
Commonwealth Games
Silver medal – second place	1994 Victoria	Women's fours

Linda Ahmat (born 1952) is a former Papua New Guinea international lawn bowler.

Ahmat won a silver medal in the Women's fours at the 1994 Commonwealth Games in Victoria with Cunera Monalua, Elizabeth Bure and Wena Piande.

She has also competed in the fours event at the 2002 Commonwealth Games.
