= Scotland at the Commonwealth Games =

- CG code: SCO
- CGA: Commonwealth Games Scotland
- Website: teamscotland.scot
- Medals Ranked 6th: Gold 145 Silver 152 Bronze 244 Total 541

Commonwealth Games appearances (overview)
- 1930; 1934; 1938; 1950; 1954; 1958; 1962; 1966; 1970; 1974; 1978; 1982; 1986; 1990; 1994; 1998; 2002; 2006; 2010; 2014; 2018; 2022; 2026; 2030

Scotland is one of only six countries to have competed in every Commonwealth Games since the first Empire Games in 1930. The others are Australia, Canada, England, New Zealand and Wales. The Commonwealth Games is the only major multi-sport event in which Scottish athletes and teams compete as Scotland; otherwise Scotland participates in multi-sport events as part of a Great Britain team.

The country has hosted the Commonwealth Games three times, Edinburgh in 1970 and 1986, and Glasgow in 2014. Glasgow is set to host the XXIII Commonwealth Games in 2026. The inaugural Commonwealth Youth Games were held in Edinburgh in 2000.

== Milestones and achievements ==
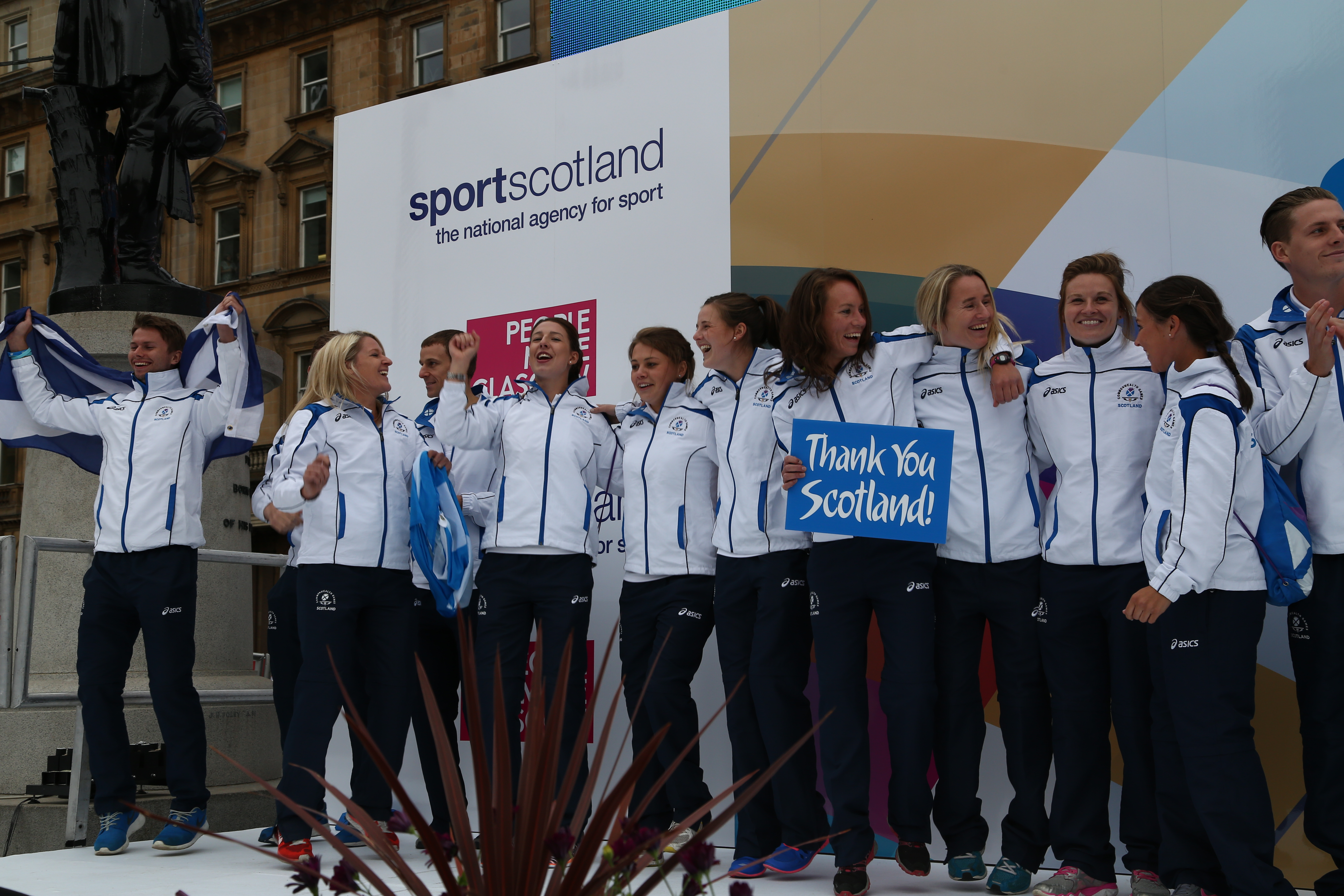
Athletes from Team Scotland parade through Glasgow following the 2014 Games.

Scotland sent a team of 259 athletes and 166 officials to the 2022 Commonwealth Games in Birmingham, England, and won 51 medals (13 Gold, 11 Silver and 27 Bronze). After the 2018 Commonwealth Games in Gold Coast, Queensland, Australia, Scotland was seventh in the all-time tally of medals, with an overall total of 451 medals (119 Gold, 132 Silver and 200 Bronze). Scotland's most successful Commonwealth medallist by total medals is swimmer Duncan Scott, with 3 Gold, 2 Silver and 8 Bronze medals from 2014 to 2022. In 2018, Lawn Bowler Alex Marshall became the most successful athlete by Golds, winning his fifth Gold Medal which gave him 6 overall, having also won a Silver at the Gold Coast Games. This was also followed by a bronze in Birmingham 2022.

Other successful medallists include athlete Allan Wells (a total of 4 Gold, 1 Silver & 1 Bronze in two Games – 1978 & 1982) and Peter Heatly (diving Gold's in three successive Games & 1 Silver & 1 Bronze – 1950, 1954 & 1958). Lawn bowler Willie Wood is the first competitor to have competed in seven Commonwealth Games, from 1974 to 2002, missing 1986 because of a dispute over amateurism.

Scotland won its 500th overall medal at the 2022 Commonwealth Games in Birmingham, England after runner Eilish McColgan won silver in the Women's 5,000m. These games were also the best performing for Scotland outwith Glasgow 2014.

== Medal tally ==
Host country (Scotland)

Games	Gold	Silver	Bronze	Total
1930 Hamilton	2	3	5	10
1934 London	5	4	16	25
1938 Sydney	0	2	3	5
1950 Auckland	5	3	2	10
1954 Vancouver	6	2	5	13
1958 Cardiff	5	5	3	13
1962 Perth	4	7	3	14
1966 Kingston	1	4	4	9
1970 Edinburgh*	6	8	11	25
1974 Christchurch	3	5	11	19
1978 Edmonton	3	6	5	14
1982 Brisbane	8	6	12	26
1986 Edinburgh*	3	12	18	33
1990 Auckland	5	7	10	22
1994 Victoria	6	3	11	20
1998 Kuala Lumpur	3	2	7	12
2002 Manchester	6	8	16	30
2006 Melbourne	11	7	11	29
2010 Delhi	9	10	7	26
2014 Glasgow*	19	15	19	53
2018 Gold Coast	9	13	22	44
2022 Birmingham	13	12	26	51
2026 Glasgow*	13	9	17	39
Totals (23 entries)	145	153	244	542

== Flag and victory anthem ==
Logo of Team Scotland

During the Commonwealth Games, Team Scotland use the national flag of Scotland, The Saltire, as their visual identification flag. From 2010 onwards, Scotland has used "Flower of Scotland" as the victory anthem. This replaces "Scotland the Brave" which was used at previous between 1958 and 2006. Prior to 1958, "Scots Wha Hae" was used. The new anthem was chosen in January 2010 by athletes that had been selected to participate in the 2010 games. The shortlist of anthems also included "Scotland the Brave", "Loch Lomond" and "Highland Cathedral".

== Host nation ==
Scotland has hosted the main Commonwealth Games four times – 1970 and 1986 were both hosted in Edinburgh, whilst the 2014 and 2026 editions of the games were held in Glasgow. Edinburgh also hosted the inaugural Commonwealth Youth Games in 2000.

== Commonwealth Games council and member governing bodies ==
The Commonwealth Games Council for Scotland (CGCS) is the national sporting organisation responsible for entering a Scottish team in the Commonwealth Games and the Commonwealth Youth Games. It is also responsible for organising bids for hosting the Commonwealth Games. The CGCS headquarters is at Airthrey Castle, on the campus of the University of Stirling.

Membership of the CGCS consists of representatives of the governing bodies predominantly of sports in the Commonwealth Games programme although membership is open to wider organisations such as Scottish Disability Sport sharing CGS values:

- Aquatics: Scottish Swimming
- Archery: Scottish Archery Association
- Athletics: Scottish Athletics
- Badminton: Badminton Scotland
- Basketball: Basketball Scotland
- Beach Volleyball: Scottish Volleyball
- Boxing: Amateur Boxing Scotland
- Canoeing: Scottish Canoe Association
- Cricket: Cricket Scotland
- Cycling: Scottish Cycling
- Fencing: Scottish fencing
- Field hockey: Scottish Hockey Union
- Gymnastics: Scottish Gymnastics
- Judo: Judo Scotland
- Lawn bowling (men's): Scottish Bowling Association
- Lawn bowling (women's): Scottish Women's Bowling Association
- Netball: Netball Scotland
- Rowing: Scottish Amateur Rowing Association
- Rugby union: Scottish Rugby Union
- Shooting: Scottish Target Shooting Federation
- Squash: Scottish Squash
- Tennis: Tennis Scotland
- Table Tennis: Table Tennis Scotland
- Tenpin bowling: Scottish Tenpin Bowling Association
- Triathlon: Scottish Triathlon Association
- Weightlifting: Scottish Amateur Weightlifters Association
- Wrestling: Scottish Wrestling Association
- Disabled sport: Scottish disability sport

== See also ==
- 2014 Commonwealth Games
- Glasgow bid for the 2014 Commonwealth Games
- Scotland at the 2010 Commonwealth Games
- Scotland at the 2006 Commonwealth Games
- Scotland at the 2002 Commonwealth Games
- Scotland at the 1998 Commonwealth Games
- All-time medal tally of Commonwealth Games
- Sport in Scotland
