= Elizabeth Bure =

Papua New Guinean international lawn bowler

Personal information
- Nationality: Papua New Guinea
- Born: 25 February 1948 (age 78)
Medal record
Representing Papua New Guinea
Commonwealth Games
Silver medal – second place	1994 Victoria	Women's fours

Elizabeth Bure (born 1948) is a former Papua New Guinea international lawn bowler.

Bure won a silver medal in the Women's fours at the 1994 Commonwealth Games in Victoria with Cunera Monalua, Linda Ahmat and Wena Piande.

She has also competed in the fours event at the 2002 Commonwealth Games and the triples event at the 2010 Commonwealth Games.
