= Donald Piketh =

Personal information
- Nationality: South Africa
- Born: 21 March 1966
Medal record
Representing South Africa
Commonwealth Games
Gold medal – first place	1994 Victoria	fours

Donald Piketh (born 1966) is a former South African international lawn and indoor bowler.

He won a gold medal in the fours at the 1994 Commonwealth Games in Victoria with Robert Rayfield, Alan Lofthouse and Neil Burkett.
