= Cunera Monalua =

Papua New Guinean lawn bowler

Personal information
- Nationality: Papua New Guinean
- Born: 11 September 1953 (age 72)
Medal record
Representing Papua New Guinea
Commonwealth Games
Silver medal – second place	1994 Victoria	Women's fours
Asia Pacific Bowls Championships
Gold medal – first place	1987 Lae	triples

Cunera Monalua is a former Papua New Guinea international lawn bowler.

== Bowls career ==
Monalua won a triples gold medal at the Asia Pacific Bowls Championships in Lae, Papua New Guinea.

She won a silver medal in the Women's fours at the 1994 Commonwealth Games in Victoria with Elizabeth Bure, Linda Ahmat and Wena Piande.

Sixteen years later she competed in the pairs event at the 2010 Commonwealth Games. Monalua has also won a gold medal in the triples at the Asia Pacific Bowls Championships.
