= Robert Parrella =

Australian bowls player

Rob Parrella OAM
Personal information
- Nationality: Australian
- Born: 9 June 1944 Italy
- Died: 30 December 2025 Australia

Sport
- Sport: Lawn bowls
Medal record
Representing Australia
Commonwealth Games
Silver medal – second place	1982 Brisbane	singles
Gold medal – first place	1990 Auckland	singles
Bronze medal – third place	1994 Victoria	singles
Asia Pacific Bowls Championships
Gold medal – first place	1989 Suva	singles
Gold medal – first place	1989 Suva	pairs
Gold medal – first place	1991 Kowloon	singles

Robert Parrella (9 June 1944 - 28 December 2025) was an Australian international lawn and indoor bowler.

== Early life ==
Parrella was born in Naples, Italy and arrived in Queensland at the age of 10.

== Bowls career ==
Parrella began playing bocce as a child in Italy. In 1974 he was an Australian bocce champion.

=== Commonwealth Games ===
Parrella came to prominence when winning a silver medal in the 1982 Commonwealth Games behind Willie Wood. Despite this success he fell out of favour with the Australian selectors and it was not until 1989 that he represented his country again.

In the 1990 Commonwealth Games he won the singles Gold and in the 1994 Commonwealth Games he won a bronze medal in the singles.

=== World Championships ===
He only competed in one World Outdoor Championship in 1992.

=== Asia Pacific Championships ===
He has won three gold medals at the Asia Pacific Bowls Championships in 1989 (singles and pairs) and 1991 (singles).

=== National ===
He has twice been Australian National Bowls Championships singles champion and four times pairs champion.

=== Awards ===
Parrella was awarded the Medal of the Order of Australia (OAM) on Australia Day 1996 for service to sport, particularly lawn bowls and on 14 July 2000 he was awarded the Australian Sports Medal for significant contribution to lawn bowls as a competitor.

Other awards include recognition as Bowls Australia Athlete of the Year in 1989 and induction into the Queensland Sports Hall of Fame on 4 December 2009.
