= Carmen Anderson =

Norfolk Islander lawn bowler

Personal information
- Nationality: Norfolk Islander
- Born: 18 July 1955 (age 70) Albuera, Philippines
Medal record
Representing Norfolk Island
World Outdoor Championships
Gold medal – first place	1996 Leamington Spa	Women's singles
Commonwealth Games
Bronze medal – third place	1994 Victoria	Women's singles
Asia Pacific Bowls Championships
Gold medal – first place	1991 Kowloon	singles
Gold medal – first place	1993 Victoria	singles
Gold medal – first place	1995 Dunedin	singles
Gold medal – first place	1997 Warilla	pairs
Silver medal – second place	2001 Melbourne	singles
Silver medal – second place	2009 Kuala Lumpur	pairs
Bronze medal – third place	2011 Adelaide	singles
Silver medal – second place	2015 Christchurch	singles
Bronze medal – third place	2015 Christchurch	pairs
Silver medal – second place	2019 Gold Coast	singles
Representing Philippines
Asia Pacific Bowls Championships
Gold medal – first place	2003 Brisbane	singles

Carmelita 'Carmen' Anderson (née Bishop) is a Norfolk Islander lawn bowls international.

== Bowls career ==
=== World Championship ===
Anderson won the gold medal in the singles at the 1996 World Outdoor Bowls Championship in Leamington Spa. In 2020, she was selected for the 2020 World Outdoor Bowls Championship in Australia but the event was cancelled due to the COVID-19 pandemic.

In 2023, she was selected as part of the team to represent the Norfolk Islands at the 2023 World Outdoor Bowls Championship. She participated in the women's pairs and the women's fours events. In the pairs partnering Shae Wilson, she won her group undefeated but lost to Malta in the quarter finals.

=== Commonwealth Games ===
She won Norfolk Island's first medal at the 1994 Commonwealth Games in Victoria, Canada, when she won a bronze medal. In 2022, she competed in the women's pairs and the Women's fours at the 2022 Commonwealth Games.

=== Asia Pacific ===
Anderson is one of the most successful female bowlers of all time at the Asia Pacific Bowls Championships where she has won eleven medals including five golds (four in singles competition). Her eleventh medal came at the 2019 Asia Pacific Bowls Championships in the Gold Coast, Queensland.

== Personal life ==
She holds Australian citizenship and received the Medal of the Order of Australia in 1999.
