= Rita Jones =

Welsh lawn and indoor bowler

Personal information
- Nationality: Welsh
- Born: 1938 (age 87–88)

Sport
- Club: Gilfach Bargoed BC, Merthyr BC & Islwyn BC
Medal record
lawn bowls
World Outdoor Championships
Bronze medal – third place	1985 Melbourne	triples
Silver medal – second place	2000 Moama	singles
Commonwealth Games
Gold medal – first place	1986 Edinburgh	fours
Silver medal – second place	1994 Victoria	singles
Bronze medal – third place	1998 Kuala Lumpur	pairs
Atlantic Bowls Championships
Silver medal – second place	1993 Florida	singles
Gold medal – first place	1993 Florida	triples
Silver medal – second place	1995 Durban	triples
Silver medal – second place	1997 Llandrindod Wells	fours
British Isles Championships
Gold medal – first place	1992	fours
Gold medal – first place	1993	fours

Rita Jones is a former Welsh international lawn and indoor bowler.

== Bowls career ==
In 1985 Jones won a triples bronze medal at the 1985 World Outdoor Bowls Championship in Preston, Victoria, Melbourne, Australia.

She won the gold medal in the fours at the 1986 Commonwealth Games in Edinburgh, a silver medal at the 1994 Commonwealth Games and a bronze medal in the pairs with Ann Sutherland at the 1998 Commonwealth Games in Kuala Lumpur.

Jones has won four medals at the Atlantic Bowls Championships including a gold medal in the triples at the 1993 inaugural tournament in Florida.

Jones has also won the 15 National indoor singles titles; five singles in 1979, 1984, 1986, 1991 and 1992, the pairs in 1993, the triples four times and fours on five occasions.
