= Geua Vada Tau =

Papua New Guinean Lawn Bowler (born 1957)

Geua Vada-Tau
Personal information
- Born: 3 May 1957 (age 69) Port Moresby, Papua New Guinea

Sport
- Sport: Lawn Bowls
- Event: Singles
Medal record
Women's Lawn bowls
Representing Papua New Guinea
Commonwealth Games
Gold medal – first place	1990 Auckland	Singles
- Updated on 23 August 2017

Geau Vada-Tau (born 3 May 1957) is a Papua New Guinean lawn bowler. Tau came to prominence in 1990 when she won the gold medal in the singles at the Auckland Commonwealth Games without losing a game. She became a national heroine as the first Commonwealth Games gold medalist from Papua New Guinea. Tau plays for the Boroko Club in Port Moresby.
