= Papua New Guinea at the 1994 Commonwealth Games =

Sporting event delegation

Flag of Papua New Guinea

Papua New Guinea at the 1994 Commonwealth Games was abbreviated PNG. It won one silver medal at the games.

== Medals ==
| | Gold | Silver | Bronze | Total |
|---|---|---|---|---|
| Papua New Guinea | 0 | 1 | 0 | 1 |

=== Gold ===
- none

=== Silver ===
- National team—Bowls, Women's Fours

=== Bronze ===
- none
