= Hester Bekker =

South African bowler

Personal information
- Nationality: South African

Sport
- Club: Leases, Sables
Medal record
Representing South Africa
World Outdoor Championships
Gold medal – first place	1996 Leamington Spa	triples
Silver medal – second place	1996 Leamington Spa	fours
Gold medal – first place	1996 Leamington Spa	team
Commonwealth Games
Gold medal – first place	1994 Victoria	fours
Gold medal – first place	1998 Kuala Lumpur	fours
Atlantic Bowls Championships
Gold medal – first place	1995 Durban	triples
Silver medal – second place	1995 Durban	fours
Gold medal – first place	1997 Llandrindod Wells	fours
Gold medal – first place	1999 Cape Town	fours
Silver medal – second place	1999 Cape Town	pairs

Hester Bekker is a former international lawn and indoor bowls competitor for South Africa.

== Bowls career ==
In 1996, Bekker won the gold medal in the triples at the 1996 World Outdoor Bowls Championship in Adelaide. Four years later, Bekker just missed out on a bronze medal after losing the triples bronze play off match in Moama.

She was part of the fours team that won the gold medal at both the 1994 Commonwealth Games, it was the first time that South Africa had won a gold medal since 1958, following the return from their Anti-Apartheid Movement Commonwealth ban enforced in 1961.

She won another gold at the 1998 Commonwealth Games.

Bekker has won five medals at the Atlantic Bowls Championships. In 1995 she won triples gold medal and fours silver medal in her home country. Two years later in 1997 she won the fours gold medal in Wales before winning two more medals in Cape Town during 1999, including a third Atlantic Championships gold.
