= Marlene Castle =

New Zealand lawn bowls competitor (born 1944)

Personal information
- Born: 13 March 1944 (age 82) Auckland, New Zealand
- Spouse: Bruce Castle
- Relative: Raelene Castle (daughter)

Sport
- Country: New Zealand
- Sport: Lawn bowls
- Club: Orewa BC
Medal record
Representing New Zealand
World Outdoor Championships
Silver medal – second place	1992 Ayr	triples
Silver medal – second place	1992 Ayr	fours
Bronze medal – third place	1992 Ayr	team
Bronze medal – third place	2004 Leamington Spa	triples
Commonwealth Games
Silver medal – second place	1990 Auckland	fours
Bronze medal – third place	1994 Victoria	fours
Bronze medal – third place	2002 Manchester	singles
World Indoor Championships
Gold medal – first place	2000 Belfast	singles
Asia Pacific Bowls Championships
Silver medal – second place	1989 Suva	triples
Gold medal – first place	1989 Suva	fours
Silver medal – second place	1991 Kowloon	fours
Silver medal – second place	1993 Victoria	singles
Gold medal – first place	1995 Dunedin	triples
Gold medal – first place	1995 Dunedin	fours
Silver medal – second place	1997 Warilla	triples
Silver medal – second place	1997 Warilla	fours
Gold medal – first place	1999 Kuala Lumpur	singles
Gold medal – first place	2001 Melbourne	singles
Silver medal – second place	2001 Melbourne	triples
Silver medal – second place	2003 Brisbane	singles

Marlene Robyn Castle (born 13 March 1944) is a lawn and indoor bowls international for New Zealand.

== Bowls career ==
The veteran of four Commonwealth Games won her first medal at the 1990 Commonwealth Games, earning a silver in the women's fours. Again as part of the women's fours team she won a bronze medal at the 1994 Commonwealth Games. Her last Commonwealth medal was at the 2002 Commonwealth Games where she won a bronze in the women's singles.

Castle has won twelve medals at the Asia Pacific Bowls Championships including five gold medals.

Castle won the 2001 pairs title and the 1999 fours title at the New Zealand National Bowls Championships when bowling for the Orewa Bowls Club.

== Awards ==
In 1990, Castle was awarded the New Zealand 1990 Commemoration Medal. In 2013, she was an inaugural inductee into the Bowls New Zealand Hall of Fame.

== Personal life ==
Her husband is Bruce Castle, a former New Zealand Kiwis captain, and her daughter Raelene Castle is a sports administrator. Raelene has previously served as the chief executive officer of Netball New Zealand and the Canterbury-Bankstown Bulldogs, and became the CEO of Rugby Australia in December 2017.
