= Betty Forsyth =

Scottish bowls player (1945–2021)

Personal information
- Full name: Elizabeth Leishman Forsyth
- Nationality: British (Scottish)
- Born: 6 April 1945
- Died: May 2021 (aged 76)

Sport
- Sport: Lawn bowls
- Club: Blantyre BC
Medal record
Women's lawn bowls
Representing Scotland
World Outdoor Championships
Bronze medal – third place	1996 Leamington Spa	Women's Team
Silver medal – second place	2000 Moama	Women's Fours
Bronze medal – third place	2000 Moama	Women's Team
Commonwealth Games
Bronze medal – third place	1994 Victoria	Women's Fours
Atlantic Bowls Championships
Gold medal – first place	1995 Durban	fours
Silver medal – second place	2005 Bangor	fours

Elizabeth Leishman Forsyth (6 April 1945 – May 2021) was a Scottish international female lawn and indoor bowler.

== Bowls career ==
Forsyth represented Scotland in the fours at the 1994 Commonwealth Games in Victoria, British Columbia, Canada and won a bronze medal, the 1998 Commonwealth Games, 2002 Commonwealth Games and 2006 Commonwealth Games.

She also won a fours silver medal at the 2000 World Outdoor Bowls Championship in Moama, Australia.

In 1995 she won the fours gold medal at the Atlantic Bowls Championships and ten years later won the fours silver medal at the Championships.
