= 2000 World Outdoor Bowls Championship – Men's fours =

World bowls event

World Outdoor Championships 2000 men's fours
- 9th World Outdoor Bowls Championships
- Location: , Johannesburg, South Africa
- Date(s): 1 April - 15 April 2000
- Category: World Bowls Championship

The 2000 Men's World Outdoor Bowls Championship men's fours was held at Marks Park Bowling Club, in Johannesburg, South Africa, from 1 to 15 April 2000.

Mark Williams, Robert Weale, Stephen Rees and Will Thomas of Wales won the gold medal.

== Qualifying round ==
=== Section A ===
Pos	Player	P	W	D	L	Pts
1	(Scotland) Robert Marshall, George Sneddon, Jim McIntyre & Willie Wood	10	7	1	2	17
2	(New Zealand) Russell Meyer, Paul Girdler, Rowan Brassey & Peter Belliss	10	7	0	3	16 (+46)
3	(Hong Kong) Anthony Carstairs, Willie Lai, Adam Poynton, James Cheng	10	7	0	3	16 (+28)
4	(England) John Ottaway, Stuart Airey, David Holt & Andy Thomson	10	6	0	4	14 (+47)
5	(Canada) Chris Grahame, Nick Watkins, Dave Anderson & Mark Sandford	10	6	0	4	14 (+12)
6	(Israel) Yair Lieberthal, Moshe Renan, Chaim Shefer, George Kaminsky	10	5	1	4	13 (+1)
7	Malaysia	10	5	1	4	13 (-8)
8	Fiji	10	4	0	6	10
9	Botswana	10	2	1	7	7
10	Zambia	10	2	0	8	6 (-50)
11	Argentina	10	2	0	8	6 (-84)

=== Section B ===
Pos	Player	P	W	D	L	Pts
1	(Wales) Mark Williams, Robert Weale, Stephen Rees & Will Thomas	11	9	1	1	19
2	(South Africa) Bruce Makkink, Bobby Donnelly, Shaun Addinall & Neil Burkett	11	8	1	2	17
3	(Australia) Adam Jeffery, Mark Jacobsen, Brett Duprez & Rex Johnston	11	8	0	3	16
4	Namibia	11	7	0	4	14 (+33)
5	Martin McHugh, Neil Booth, Ian McClure & Gary McCloy	11	7	0	4	14 (+32)
6	Zimbabwe	11	6	0	5	12
7	(Jersey) Allan Quemard, Cyril Renouf, Frank Hambly & Lee Nixon	11	5	1	5	11
8	(United States) Ian Ho, Barry Pickup, Jim Copeland +, Doug McArthur & Joel Stearn	11	5	0	6	10
9	Norfolk Island	11	4	0	7	8
10	(Eswatini) Swaziland	11	3	1	7	7
11	(Guernsey) Gary Pitschou, Paul Ingrouille, Dennis Baglin & Dave Lucas	11	2	0	9	4
12	Singapore	11	0	0	11	0

+ Replacement

== Finals ==
Semifinals
Wales	23
New Zealand	19
South Africa	20
Scotland	8

Gold medal
Wales	21
South Africa	12

== Results ==
Men's fours section A
Round 1 - 9 Apr		
Hong Kong	Scotland	21–18
Canada	Israel	19–16
New Zealand	England	14–13
Malaysia	Fiji	19–17
Argentina	Zambia	23–19
Round 2 - 9 Apr		
England	Scotland	26–22
Israel	Hong Kong	21–15
New Zealand	Canada	21–16
Malaysia	Argentina	17–14
Botswana	Zambia	16–14
Round 3 - 10 Apr		
England	Israel	21-12
Hong Kong	Canada	22-17
Malaysia	Botswana	19-19
Scotland	New Zealand	18-12
Fiji	Argentina	29-23
Round 4 - 10 Apr		
Fiji	England	21-19
Scotland	Malaysia	29-10
New Zealand	Argentina	33-14
Israel	Zambia	22-12
Canada	Botswana	28-18
Round 5 - 11 Apr		
Scotland	Fiji	27-16
England	Argentina	32-15
Hong Kong	Botswana	20-18
New Zealand	Malaysia	24-14
Zambia	Canada	15-10
Round 6 - 11 Apr		
Malaysia	England	26-23
Hong Kong	Fiji	29-16
New Zealand	Zambia	29-12
Israel	Botswana	27-17
Canada	Argentina	31-11
Round 7 - 12 Apr		
Zambia	England	25-11
Scotland	Botswana	31-13
Malaysia	Hong Kong	23-21
New Zealand	Fiji	22-19
Israel	Argentina	23-18
Round 8 - 12 Apr		
Scotland	Argentina	28-16
Hong Kong	Zambia	18-13
Botswana	New Zealand	20-15
Israel	Fiji	22-19
Canada	Malaysia	23-22
Round 9 - 12 Apr		
England	Botswana	23-14
Scotland	Zambia	28-17
Hong Kong	Argentina	24-13
Malaysia	Israel	30-16
Canada	Fiji	23-22
Round 10 - 13 Apr		
England	Hong Kong	26-11
Scotland	Canada	20-12
Argentina	Botswana	28-15
New Zealand	Israel	24-17
Fiji	Zambia	20-12
Round 11 - 13 Apr		
England	Canada	21-12
Scotland	Israel	15-15
Hong Kong	New Zealand	24-15
Fiji	Botswana	33-16
Zambia	Malaysia	22-21

Men's fours section B
Round 1 - 9 Apr		
South Africa	Namibia	20–12
Wales	(Eswatini) Swaziland	29–11
Australia	Ireland	25–19
United States	Guernsey	28–24
Jersey	Singapore	21–12
Zimbabwe	Norfolk Island	17–16
Round 2 - 9 Apr		
South Africa	Guernsey	22–12
Namibia	(Eswatini) Swaziland	24–20
Australia	Singapore	31–10
Wales	United States	20–10
Zimbabwe	Jersey	23–16
Ireland	Norfolk Island	17–16
Round 3 - 10 Apr		
Guernsey	(Eswatini) Swaziland	23-21
Wales	Namibia	27-23
Norfolk Island	Singapore	28-12
South Africa	United States	23-9
Jersey	Australia	19-17
Ireland	Zimbabwe	29-11
Round 4 - 10 Apr		
Namibia	Guernsey	24-15
South Africa	Wales	27-18
Australia	Norfolk Island	21-11
(Eswatini) Swaziland	United States	31-23
Ireland	Jersey	23-17
Zimbabwe	Singapore	34-14
Round 5 - 11 Apr		
Wales	Guernsey	22-13
South Africa	(Eswatini) Swaziland	23-14
Australia	Zimbabwe	21-10
Namibia	United States	30-18
Norfolk Island	Jersey	18-18
Ireland	Singapore	30-12
Round 6 - 12 Apr		
Jersey	Guernsey	25-17
South Africa	Singapore	35-9
Namibia	Zimbabwe	19-12
United States	Argentina	21-19
(Eswatini) Swaziland	Ireland	22-20
Wales	Norfolk Island	27-6
Round 7 - 12 Apr		
Australia	Guernsey	23-13
South Africa	Jersey	21-20
Namibia	Norfolk Island	23-21
United States	Singapore	24-14
Zimbabwe	(Eswatini) Swaziland	28-7
Wales	Ireland	23-13
Round 8 - 12 Apr		
Guernsey	Singapore	36-12
Zimbabwe	South Africa	22-20
Namibia	Jersey	23-16
(Eswatini) Swaziland	Norfolk Island	18-18
United States	Ireland	27-18
Wales	Australia	15-15
Round 9 - 13 Apr		
Ireland	Guernsey	24-12
South Africa	Norfolk Island	33-16
Namibia	Singapore	30-12
Jersey	United States	21-17
Australia	(Eswatini) Swaziland	27-15
Wales	Zimbabwe	25-19
Round 10 - 13 Apr		
Zimbabwe	Guernsey	21-16
South Africa	Australia	20-20
Ireland	Namibia	16-14
Norfolk Island	United States	21-13
Jersey	(Eswatini) Swaziland	20-14
Wales	Singapore	21-9
Round 11 - 13 Apr		
Norfolk Island	Guernsey	22-14
Ireland	South Africa	24-22
Australia	Namibia	30-19
United States	Zimbabwe	20-19
(Eswatini) Swaziland	Singapore	29-11
Wales	Jersey	25-15
