= 2000 World Outdoor Bowls Championship – Men's triples =

World bowls event

World Outdoor Championships 2000 men's triples
- 9th World Outdoor Bowls Championships
- Location: , Johannesburg, South Africa
- Date(s): 1–15 April 2000
- Category: World Bowls Championship

The 2000 Men's World Outdoor Bowls Championship men's triples was held at Marks Park Bowling Club, in Johannesburg, South Africa, from 1 to 15 April 2000.

Andrew Curtain, Rowan Brassey and Peter Belliss of New Zealand won the gold medal.

== Qualifying round ==
=== Section A ===
Pos	Player	P	W	D	L	F	A	Pts	Shots
1	(Scotland) Robert Marshall, Jim McIntyre & Willie Wood	10	9	0	1	235	111	18	+124
2	Martin McHugh, Ian McClure & Gary McCloy	10	8	0	2	198	132	16	+66
3	(Wales) Mark Williams, Stephen Rees & Will Thomas	10	8	0	2	198	141	16	+57
4	(South Africa) Bruce Makkink, Bobby Donnelly & Neil Burkett	10	6	1	3	211	133	15	+78
5	Malaysia	10	4	2	4	167	188	10	-21
6	(Canada) Chris Grahame, Nick Watkins & James Covell	10	4	1	5	162	169	9	-7
7	Zambia	10	3	0	7	147	201	6	-54
8	Botswana	10	3	0	7	146	209	6	-63
9	(Hong Kong) Willie Lai, Adam Poynton & James Cheng	10	3	0	7	133	204	6	-71
10	Namibia	10	2	1	7	177	200	5	-23
11	Argentina	10	2	1	7	135	221	5	-86

=== Section B ===
Pos	Player	P	W	D	L	F	A	Pts	Shots
1	(New Zealand) Andrew Curtain, Rowan Brassey & Peter Belliss	11	11	0	0	232	105	22	+127
2	(Australia) Adam Jeffery, Steve Glasson & Rex Johnston	11	9	0	2	202	152	18	+50
3	Zimbabwe	11	8	0	3	211	164	16	+47
4	(Israel) Moshe Renan, Chaim Shefer, George Kaminsky	11	7	0	4	211	142	14	+69
5	(England) Stuart Airey, David Holt & Tony Allcock	11	7	0	4	214	153	14	+61
6	(Eswatini) Swaziland	11	6	0	5	163	206	12	-43
7	Fiji	11	5	0	6	227	193	10	+34
8	(Jersey) Cyril Renouf, Frank Hambly & Lee Nixon	11	5	0	6	197	195	10	+2
9	(United States) Tom Stirrat, Doug McArthur & Joel Stearn	11	4	0	7	172	178	8	-6
10	Norfolk Island	11	2	0	9	137	225	4	-88
11	Singapore	11	1	0	10	116	236	2	-120
12	(Guernsey) Dave Trebert, Dennis Baglin & Dave Lucas	11	1	0	10	123	256	2	-133

== Finals ==
Semifinals
New Zealand	16
(Republic of Ireland) Ireland	13
Australia	20
Scotland	13

Gold medal
New Zealand	23
Australia	13

== Results ==
Men's triples section A
Round 1 – 1 Apr		
South Africa	Argentina	30–8
Zambia	Hong Kong	22–7
Wales	Ireland	15–14
Scotland	Malaysia	33–13
Canada	Namibia	24–17
Round 2 – 2 Apr		
South Africa	Namibia	16–15
Hong Kong	Wales	22–8
Scotland	Botswana	22–6
Ireland	Argentina	20–19
Malaysia	Canada	21–18
Round 3 – 2 Apr		
Wales	South Africa	17–14
Ireland	Hong Kong	22–11
Scotland	Namibia	24–13
Argentina	Zambia	14–13
Botswana	Malaysia	27–14
Round 4 – 3 Apr		
South Africa	Hong Kong	42–4
Ireland	Zambia	22–13
Botswana	Namibia	20–14
Wales	Argentina	27–11
Scotland	Canada	19–9
Round 5 – 3 Apr		
Ireland	South Africa	21–11
Wales	Zambia	36–5
Canada	Botswana	24–14
Hong Kong	Argentina	19–10
Malaysia	Namibia	15–15
Round 6 – 3 Apr		
South Africa	Malaysia	22–12
Botswana	Argentina	27–9
Scotland	Zambia	23–20
Canada	Hong Kong	17–15
Ireland	Namibia	26–14
Round 7 – 4 Apr		
South Africa	Botswana	29–6
Malaysia	Zambia	23–9
Namibia	Hong Kong	25–10
Scotland	Argentina	34–11
Wales	Canada	21–15
Round 8 – 5 Apr		
Scotland	South Africa	20–8
Zambia	Canada	18–13
Malaysia	Hong Kong	20–14
Wales	Namibia	20–14
Ireland	Botswana	27–8
Round 9 – 5 Apr		
Namibia	Zambia	32–16
Scotland	Hong Kong	28–4
Argentina	Malaysia	20–20
Wales	Botswana	26–13
Ireland	Canada	17–13
Round 10 – 6 Apr		
South Africa	Canada	14–14
Zambia	Botswana	16–15
Argentina	Namibia	20–16
Malaysia	Wales	21–15
Scotland	Ireland	20–14
Round 11 – 6 Apr		
South Africa	Namibia	26–16
Hong Kong	Botswana	27–10
Canada	Argentina	15–13
Wales	Scotland	13–12
Ireland	Malaysia	15–8

Men's triples section B
Round 1 – 1 Apr		
New Zealand	Jersey	21–11
England	Israel	21–14
Guernsey	Singapore	22–10
Australia	Fiji	16–14
Zimbabwe	Norfolk Island	18–13
(Eswatini) Swaziland	United States	18–12
Round 2 – 2 Apr		
New Zealand	United States	21–10
Israel	Singapore	29–8
Zimbabwe	Fiji	27–17
Australia	(Eswatini) Swaziland	22–13
England	Norfolk Island	19–10
Jersey	Guernsey	20–12
Round 3 – 2 Apr		
New Zealand	Guernsey	23–7
Zimbabwe	Israel	18–12
Norfolk Island	Fiji	18–17
Australia	United States	18–17
England	Singapore	23–11
(Eswatini) Swaziland	Jersey	19–14
Round 4 – 3 Apr		
New Zealand	Singapore	29–9
Israel	Guernsey	21–9
Fiji	(Eswatini) Swaziland	30–9
Australia	Norfolk Island	18–15
Zimbabwe	England	19–15
United States	Jersey	17–14
Round 5 – 3 Apr		
New Zealand	Norfolk Island	20–8
Israel	(Eswatini) Swaziland	30–8
Fiji	Guernsey	35–8
Australia	Singapore	21–9
England	United States	21–8
Zimbabwe	Jersey	25–14
Round 6 – 4 Apr		
New Zealand	Zimbabwe	22–9
Israel	United States	16–13
Fiji	Singapore	26–11
Australia	Guernsey	18–15
England	(Eswatini) Swaziland	24–8
Jersey	Norfolk Island	21–14
Round 7 – 4 Apr		
New Zealand	(Eswatini) Swaziland	23–7
England	Guernsey	31–6
Australia	Zimbabwe	22–9
Israel	Norfolk Island	21–7
Jersey	Singapore	25–10
Fiji	United States	27–13
Round 8 – 5 Apr		
New Zealand	England	17–11
Jersey	Fiji	28–12
United States	Norfolk Island	33–6
Australia	Israel	13–12
Zimbabwe	Guernsey	30–5
(Eswatini) Swaziland	Singapore	18–8
Round 9 – 5 Apr		
New Zealand	Fiji	18–14
Israel	Jersey	26–12
Norfolk Island	Guernsey	21–18
England	Australia	21–19
(Eswatini) Swaziland	Zimbabwe	19–16
United States	Singapore	13–8
Round 10 – 6 Apr		
New Zealand	Australia	16–10
Jersey	England	17–14
(Eswatini) Swaziland	Guernsey	25–10
Israel	Fiji	21–11
Zimbabwe	United States	18–14
Singapore	Norfolk Island	21–8
Round 11 – 6 Apr		
New Zealand	Israel	22–9
Fiji	England	24–14
United States	Guernsey	22–11
Australia	Jersey	25–11
Zimbabwe	Singapore	22–11
(Eswatini) Swaziland	Norfolk Island	19–17
