= 1992 World Outdoor Bowls Championship =

Bowls championship held in Worthing, England (Men's) Ayr, Scotland (women's)

World Outdoor Championships 1992
- 7th World Outdoor Bowls Championships
- Location: Worthing, England (Men's) Ayr, Scotland (women's)
- Date: 8–23 August 1992 (men's); 6–20 June 1992 (Women's)
- Category: World Bowls Championship

The 1992 Men's Woolwich World Outdoor Bowls Championship was held at Beach House Park, Worthing, England, from 8 to 23 August 1992.

The 1992 Women's Henselite World Championship was held at the Northfield Bowling Complex in Ayr, Scotland, from 6 to 20 June 1992.

== Medallists ==
Event	Gold	Silver	Bronze
Men's singles	(England); Tony Allcock	(Scotland); Richard Corsie	(Israel); Jeff Rabkin
Men's pairs	(Scotland); Richard Corsie; Alex Marshall	Sammy Allen; Stephen Adamson	(Canada); Ronnie Jones; Bill Boettger
Men's triples	(Israel); Leon Blum; Lawrence Mendelsohn; Cecil Bransky	(South Africa); Cyril Lahana; Robert Rayfield; Kevin Campbell	(Scotland); Graham Robertson; Willie Wood; Angus Blair
Men's fours	(Scotland); Graham Robertson; Alex Marshall; Willie Wood; Angus Blair	(Canada); Ronnie Jones; Dave Brown; Dave Houtby; Bill Boettger	(South Africa); Cyril Lahana; Neil Burkett; Robert Rayfield; Kevin Campbell
Men's team	Scotland	England	Israel
Women's singles	Margaret Johnston	(Australia); Audrey Rutherford	(England); Norma Shaw
Women's pairs	Margaret Johnston; Phillis Nolan	(Jersey); Mavis Le Marquand; Sheila Syvret	(Zambia); Helen Graham; Margaret Hughes
Women's triples	(Scotland); Joyce Lindores; Janice Maxwell; Frances Whyte	(New Zealand); Marlene Castle; Millie Khan; Adrienne Lambert	(England); Barbara Till; Edna Bessell; Norma Shaw; Babs Barlow
Women's fours	(Scotland); Joyce Lindores; Janice Maxwell; Frances Whyte; Senga McCrone	(New Zealand); Marlene Castle; Marie Watson; Adrienne Lambert; Judy Howat	(England); Jean Baker; Barbara Till; Edna Bessell; Mary Price
Women's team	Scotland	Ireland	New Zealand

== Results ==
=== Men's singles – round robin ===
Section A

Pos	Player	P	W	L	F	A	Pts	Shots
1	(England) Tony Allcock	13	11	2			22	+107
2	(Wales) Will Thomas	13	11	2			22	+101
3	(Zimbabwe) Mark McCormick	13	10	3			20	
4	(New Zealand) Peter Belliss	13	10	3			20	
5	(Zambia) Duncan Naysmith	13	8	5			16	
6	(Jersey) David Le Marquand	13	8	5			16	
7	(Canada) Peter Mutter	13	7	6			14	
8	(Kenya) Richard Dugdale	13	6	7			12	
9	(Guernsey) Mike Smith	13	5	8			10	
10	(United States) Frank Souza	13	5	8			10	
11	(Cook Islands) Joe Akaruru	13	4	9			8	
12	(Norfolk Island) Barry Wilson	13	4	9			8	
13	(Eswatini) Hayley Abrahams	13	2	11			4	
14	(Japan) Stephen Wedge	13	0	13			0	

Section B

Pos	Player	P	W	L	F	A	Pts	Shots
1	(Scotland) Richard Corsie	13	12	1	323	199	24	+124
2	(Israel) Jeff Rabkin	13	11	2	317	192	22	+125
3	(South Africa) Bill Moseley	13	11	2	310	224	22	+86
4	(Hong Kong) Mark McMahon	13	9	4	300	200	18	+100
5	(Argentina) Jose Riveros	13	9	4	310	231	18	+79
6	(Namibia) Ian Crawford	13	8	5	282	255	16	+27
7	(Australia) Robert Parrella	13	7	6	276	240	14	+36
8	Stephen Adamson	13	6	7	254	254	12	0
9	(Fiji) Caucau Turagabeci	13	6	7	263	264	12	-1
10	(Botswana) Cliff Richardson	13	5	8	237	310	10	-64
11	(Singapore) Chai Hon Yoong	13	4	9	217	300	8	-83
12	(Thailand) Sujit Sopon	13	3	10	170	321	6	-151
13	(India) Pratap Bengani	13	2	11	200	308	4	-108
14	(Papua New Guinea) Rudy Wild	13	0	13	164	325	0	-161

Third place playoff

(Israel) Rabkin bt (Wales) Thomas 25–24

Final

(England) Allcock bt (Scotland) Corsie 25–20

=== Men's pairs – round robin ===
Section A

Pos	Player	P	W	L	F	A	Pts	Shots
1	(Scotland) Richard Corsie & Alex Marshall	13						
2	(Fiji) Pani Matailevu & Caucau Turagabeci	13						
3	(Wales) Robert Weale & Will Thomas	13						
4	(New Zealand) Peter Belliss & Rowan Brassey	13						
5	(Australia) Robert Parrella & Ian Taylor	13						
6	(United States) Frank Souza & Merton Isaacman	13						
7	Botswana	13						
8	(Guernsey) Adrian Welch & Mike Nicolle	13						
9	(Hong Kong) Mel Stewart & David Tso	13						
10	Cook Islands	13						
11	(Jersey) David Le Marquand & Marcel Coutoly	13						
12	Kenya	13						
13	India	13						
14	(Japan) Toshiharu Yanaghi & Makoto Yamoto	13						

Section B

Pos	Player	P	W	L	F	A	Pts	Shots
1	Sammy Allen & Stephen Adamson	13						
2	(Canada) Ronnie Jones & Bill Boettger	13						
3	(England) Tony Allcock & John Ottaway	13						
4	(Israel) George Kaminsky & Jeff Rabkin	13						
5	(South Africa) Bill Moseley & Neil Burkett	13						
6	Zimbabwe	13						
7	Zambia	13						
8	Argentina	13						
9	(Namibia) Peet Opperman & John Shelley	13						
10	Papua New Guinea	13						
11	(Norfolk Island) Rod Karl & Barry Wilson	13						
12	(Jersey) Swaziland	13						
13	(Kenya) Singapore	13						
14	(Thailand) Prakorb Nicrodhanon & S Viswanath	13						

Third-place playoff

Canada bt Fiji 19–17

Final

Scotland bt Ireland 35–14

=== Men's triples – round robin ===
Section A

Pos	Player	P	W	L	F	A	Pts	Shots
1	(South Africa) Cyril Lahana, Robert Rayfield, Kevin Campbell	13						
2	(England) Roy Cutts, Andy Thomson, John Bell	13						
3	(Hong Kong) George Souza Jr., Mark McMahon, Noel Kennedy	13						
4	(New Zealand) Maurice Symes, Ken Walker, Phil Skoglund	13						
5	(Australia) Trevor Morris, Paul Richards, Dennis Katunarich	13						
6	Namibia	13						
7	Zimbabwe	13						
8	Botswana	13						
9	(United States) Jack Behling, George Ralston Jr. & Steve Jones	13						
10	Fiji	13						
11	(Eswatini) Swaziland	13						
12	(Guernsey) Mike Smith, Paul Ingroulle, Ken Mellor	13						
13	Thailand	13						
14	Japan	13						

Section B

Pos	Player	P	W	L	F	A	Pts	Shots
1	(Israel) Leon Blum, Lawrence Mendelsohn, Cecil Bransky	13						
2	(Scotland) Graham Robertson, Willie Wood, Angus Blair	13						
3	Canada	13						
4	(Wales) Stephen Rees, John Price & Spencer Wilshire	13						
5	Victor Dallas, John McCloughlin, Ernie Parkinson	13						
6	(Jersey) Tim Mallett, Allan Quemard, Alan Syvret & Frank Hambly+	13						
7	Singapore	13						
8	Zambia	13						
9	Argentina	13						
10	Kenya	13						
11	Cook Islands	13						
12	Papua New Guinea	13						
13	India	13						
14	Norfolk Island	13						

+ replacement

Third-place playoff

Scotland bt England 24–14

Final

Israel bt South Africa 23–11

=== Men's fours – round robin ===
Section A

Pos	Player	P	W	D	L	F	A	Pts	Shots
1	(Canada) Ronnie Jones, Dave Brown, Dave Houtby, Bill Boettger	13	11	0	2	325	208	22	+117
2	(South Africa) Cyril Lahana, Neil Burkett, Robert Rayfield, Kevin Campbell	13	10	1	2	334	166	21	+168
3	(England) John Ottaway, Roy Cutts, Andy Thomson, John Bell	13	10	0	3	326	243	20	+83
4	(Australia) Trevor Morris, Ian Taylor, Paul Richards, Dennis Katunarich	13	9	0	4	287	224	18	+63
5	Victor Dallas, John McCloughlin, Sammy Allen, Ernie Parkinson	13	8	0	5	292	201	16	+91
6	Fiji	13	8	0	5	272	249	16	+23
7	(Guernsey) Adrian Welch, Ken Mellor, Paul Ingrouille, Mike Nicolle	13	7	0	6			14	
8	Zimbabwe	13	5	0	8	254	237	10	+17
9	(Jersey) Alan Syvret, Allan Quemard, Frank Hambly, Marcel Coutouly	13	5	0	8	263	262	10	+1
10	Botswana	13	5	0	8	247	278	10	-31
11	Kenya	13	5	0	8	228	275	10	-47
12	Singapore	13	4	0	9	221	300	8	-79
13	Cook Islands	13	3	1	9	242	265	7	-23
14	Japan	13	0	0	13			0	

Section B

Pos	Player	P	W	D	L	F	A	Pts	Shots
1	(Scotland) Graham Robertson, Alex Marshall, Willie Wood, Angus Blair	13							
2	(Wales) Robert Weale, Stephen Rees, John Price, Spencer Wilshire	13							
3	(Israel) George Kaminsky, Leon Blum, Lawrence Mendelsohn, Cecil Bransky	13							
4	(Hong Kong) George Souza Jr., Mel Stewart, David Tso, Noel Kennedy	13							
5	(New Zealand) Maurice Symes, Rowan Brassey, Ken Walker, Phil Skoglund	13							
6	(Eswatini) Swaziland	13							
7	(United States) Merton Isaacman, Steve Jones, George Ralston Jr. & Jack Behling	13							
8	Namibia	13							
9	Papua New Guinea	13							
10	Argentina	13							
11	Zambia	13							
12	Norfolk Island	13							
13	India	13							
14	Thailand	13							

Third-place playoff

South Africa bt Wales 21–15

Final

Scotland bt Canada 18–15

=== W.M.Leonard Trophy ===
Pos	Team	Singles	Pairs	Triples	Fours	Total
1	Scotland	27	28	26	28	109
2	England	28	24	25	23	100
3	Israel	26	21	28	24	99
4	South Africa	23	20	27	26	96
5	Wales	25	23	19	25	92
6	Canada	15	26	23	27	91

=== Women's singles – round robin ===
Section A

Pos	Player	P	W	L	F	A	Pts	Shots
1	(Australia) Audrey Rutherford	13	10	3			10	+54
2	(Eswatini) Liz James	13	9	4			9	+63
3	(Scotland) Sarah Gourlay	13	9	4			9	+62
4	(South Africa) Anna Pretorius	13	7	6			7	+19
5	(Jersey) Sheila Syvret	13	7	6			7	+13
6	(Zimbabwe) Jenny Rickenberg	13	7	6			7	+10
7	(Zambia) Helen Graham	13	7	6			7	+4
8	(Wales) Janet Ackland	13	7	6			7	-1
9	(United States) Ann Beckley	13	7	6			7	-5
10	(Fiji) Vimla Swamy	13	7	6			7	-12
11	(Botswana) Babs Anderson	13	5	8			5	-10
12	(Hong Kong) Rae O'Donnell	13	4	9			4	-5
13	(Argentina) Maria de Gismondi	13	3	10			3	-108
14	(India) Renu Mohta	13	2	11			2	-84

Section B

Pos	Player	P	W	L	F	A	Pts	Shots
1	Margaret Johnston	11						+108
2	(England) Norma Shaw	11						+85
3	(Norfolk Island) Carmen Bishop	11						+19
4	(Israel) Helen Gordon	11						+7
5	(New Zealand) Millie Khan	11						+16
6	(Papua New Guinea) Geua Vada Tau	11						-13
7	(Guernsey) Jenny Nicolle	11						-15
8	(Namibia) Annette Breitenbach	11						-28
9	(Spain) Patsy Fisher	11						-8
10	(Canada) Dorothy Macey	11						-49
11	(Singapore) Mary Ware	11						-49
12	(Kenya) Maureen Burns	11						-83

Third-place playoff

(England) Shaw bt (Eswatini) James 25–10

Final

Johnston bt (Australia) Rutherford 25–10

=== Women's pairs – round robin ===
Section A

Pos	Player	P	W	D	L	F	A	Pts	Shots
1	Margaret Johnston & Phillis Nolan	12	9	0	3	292	180	18	+112
2	(New Zealand) Marie Watson & Judy Howat	12	8	0	4	267	188	16	+79
3	(Hong Kong) Rae O'Donnell & Rosemary McMahon	12	8	0	4	242	213	16	+29
4	(United States) Anne Barber & Ann Beckley	12	8	0	4	237	227	16	+10
5	(Guernsey) Jenny Nicolle & Anne Simon	12	7	1	5	271	202	15	+69
6	Australia	12	7	0	5	257	216	14	+41
7	(Canada) Elaine Jones & Alice Duncalf	12	7	0	5	250	223	14	+27
8	(Eswatini) Swaziland	12	7	0	5	231	217	14	+14
9	Zimbabwe	12	6	1	5	208	213	13	-5
10	South Africa	12	6	0	6	240	243	12	-3
11	Kenya	12	3	0	9	197	279	6	-82
12	Argentina	12	1	0	11	167	324	2	-157
13	India	12	0	0	12	260	356	0	-96

Section B

Pos	Player	P	W	D	L	F	A	Pts	Shots
1	(Jersey) Mavis Le Marquand & Sheila Syvret	12	10	0	2	268	213	20	+55
2	(Zambia) Helen Graham & Margaret Hughes	12	8	3	1	234	168	19	+66
3	(Scotland) Sarah Gourlay & Senga McCrone	12	8	1	3	283	177	17	+106
4	(Wales) Janet Ackland & Betty Morgan	12	7	3	2	256	177	17	+85
5	Israel	12	7	0	5	225	219	14	+6
6	(Papua New Guinea) Geua Vada Tau & Maggie Worri	12	6	1	5	230	245	13	-15
7	Norfolk Island	12	6	1	5	221	244	13	-23
8	Singapore	12	5	1	6	205	244	11	-39
9	(England) Jean Baker & Mary Price	12	5	0	7	254	222	10	+32
10	Botswana	12	5	0	7	243	216	10	+27
11	Namibia	12	4	1	7	195	271	9	-76
12	(Fiji) Radhika Prasad and Vimla Swamy	12	2	1	9	202	282	5	-80
13	Spain	12	0	0	12	159	303	0	-144

Third-place playoff

Zambia bt New Zealand 18–14

Final

Ireland bt Jersey 23–11

=== Women's triples – round robin ===
Section A

Pos	Player	P	W	D	L	F	A	Pts	Shots
1	(Scotland) Joyce Lindores, Janice Maxwell, Frances Whyte	11	9	1	1	238	150	19	+88
2	(Wales) Val Howell, Mary Davies & Rita Jones	11	9	0	2	207	143	18	+64
3	Maureen Montgomery, Joyce Mulholland & Marie Martin	11	6	2	3	189	182	14	+7
4	Australia	11	6	0	5	200	166	12	+34
5	Spain	11	6	0	5	190	194	12	-4
6	Kenya	11	5	1	5	181	159	11	+22
7	(United States) Gwen Amos, Isabel Forbes, Tecla Shepard	11	5	1	5	190	201	11	-11
8	(Jersey) M Allan, D Barrett & Jean Jones	11	4	1	6	150	201	9	-51
9	Botswana	11	4	0	7	187	208	8	-21
10	Fiji	11	3	0	8	179	198	6	-19
11	Zambia	11	3	0	8	150	196	6	-46
12	(Eswatini) Swaziland	11	3	0	8	166	229	6	-63

Section B

Pos	Player	P	W	D	L	F	A	Pts	Shots
1	(New Zealand) Marlene Castle, Millie Khan & Adrienne Lambert	12	9	0	3	244	150	18	+94
2	(England) Barbara Till, Edna Bessell, Norma Shaw & Babs Barlow+	12	8	1	3	207	160	17	+47
3	South Africa	12	8	0	4	263	180	16	+83
4	Namibia	12	8	0	4	227	171	16	+56
5	Zimbabwe	12	7	0	5	224	189	14	35
6	Israel	12	6	1	5	213	202	13	+11
7	(Hong Kong) Jenny Wallis, Linda Smith & Lena Yeung	12	6	1	5	209	202	13	+7
8	(Guernsey) B Le Cras, C le Poidevin & Sally Paul	12	6	0	6	201	207	12	-6
9	Canada	12	6	0	6	194	206	12	-12
10	(Argentina) Cuella Abelle, Graciela de Edwards & Susana de Martinez	12	5	0	7	194	194	10	0
11	Papua New Guinea	12	3	2	7	175	225	8	-50
12	India	12	2	1	9	151	268	5	-117
13	Singapore	12	1	0	11	139	287	2	-148

+ Replacement

Third-place playoff

England bt Wales 18–14

Final

Scotland bt New Zealand 27–16

=== Women's fours – round robin ===
Section A

Pos	Player	P	W	D	L	F	A	Pts	Shots
1	(Scotland) Joyce Lindores, Janice Maxwell, Frances Whyte, Senga McCrone	11						22	+64
2	(Australia) Edda Bunutto, Daphne Shaw, Melva Pearce & Margaret Sumner	11						20	+51
3	Maureen Montgomery, Joyce Mulholland, Marie Martin & Phillis Nolan	11						20	+9
4	South Africa	11						19	+45
5	Zimbabwe	11						18	+60
6	Israel	11						15	0
7	(Jersey) M Allan, D Barrett Mavis Le Marquand & Jean Jones	11						13	-24
8	Zambia	11						13	-29
9	Botswana	11						13	-31
10	(United States) Anne Barber, Gwen Amos, Isabel Forbes & Tecla Shepard	11						12	-9
11	(Eswatini) Swaziland	11						8	-47
12	Kenya	11						7	-89

Section B

Pos	Player	P	W	D	L	F	A	Pts	Shots
1	(New Zealand) Marlene Castle, Marie Watson, Adrienne Lambert & Judy Howat	12						24	+128
2	(England) Jean Baker, Barbara Till, Edna Bessell & Mary Price	12						22	+79
3	Namibia	12						19	+77
4	(Wales) Val Howell, Mary Davies, Rita Jones & Betty Morgan	12						18	+74
5	Papua New Guinea	12						18	+49
6	Canada	12						16	+64
7	(Hong Kong) Rosemary McMahon, Jenny Wallis, Linda Smith & Lena Yeung	12						14	+9
8	(Guernsey) B Le Cras, C Le Poidevin, Sally Paul & Anne Simon	12						13	+15
9	Fiji	12						12	+9
10	Spain	12						8	-18
11	Argentina	12						8	-175
12	India	12						6	-152
13	Singapore	12						4	-129

Third-place playoff

England bt Australia 22–2

Final

Scotland bt New Zealand 22–21

=== Taylor Trophy ===
Pos	Team	Singles	Pairs	Triples	Fours	Total
1	Scotland+	22	21	25	25	93
2	Ireland	26	26	20	21	93
3	New Zealand	18	23	24	24	89
4	Australia	25	15	18	22	80
5	England	24	9	23	23	79
6	Wales	11	20	22	18	71
7	South Africa	19	8	21	19	67
8	Israel	20	18	14	15	67
9	Jersey	17	25	10	12	64
10	Zimbabwe	16	10	16	17	59
11	Namibia	12	6	19	20	57
12	Zambia	14	24	5	11	54
13	Guernsey	13	17	11	10	51
14	Papua New Guinea	15	16	4	16	51

+ Scotland by virtue of +320 shots to +246 shots.
