= 2004 World Outdoor Bowls Championship – Men's triples =

World outdoor bowls championship

World Bowls Championship 2004 men's triples
- 10th World Outdoor Bowls Championships
- Location: Ayr, Scotland
- Date(s): 23 July – 7 August 2004
- Category: World Bowls Championship

The 2004 World Outdoor Bowls Championship men's triples was held at the Northfield Bowls Complex in Ayr, Scotland, from 23 July to 7 August 2004.

Jim McIntyre, Willie Wood and David Peacock of Scotland won the gold medal.

== Qualifying round ==
Four sections, three teams from each section qualify for the championship round.

=== Section 1 ===
Pos	Player	P	W	D	L	F	A	Pts	Diff
1	(New Zealand) Rowan Brassey, Sean Johnson, Gary Lawson	5	3	1	1	99	71	7	+28
2	(Hong Kong) Adam Poynton, Jimmy Chiu, Loy D'Souza	5	3	0	2	84	78	6	+6
3	(Philippines) Christopher Dagpin, Angelo Morales, Peter O'Donnell	5	2	1	2	92	75	5	+17
4	(Israel) Tzvika Hadar, Raymond Sher, Jeff Rabkin	5	2	0	3	90	103	4	-13
5	(Canada) David Anderson, Ryan Bester, Lyall Adams	5	2	0	3	78	94	4	-16
6	(Namibia) Sandy Joubert, John Shelley, Ewald Vermeulen	5	2	0	3	70	92	4	-22

=== Section 2 ===
Pos	Player	P	W	D	L	F	A	Pts	Diff
1	(South Africa) Eric Johannes, Michael Steyn, Neil Burkett	5	4	0	1	118	57	8	+61
2	(Australia) Steve Glasson, Kelvin Kerkow, Michael Wilks	5	3	0	2	81	70	6	+11
3	(Eswatini) Louis Erasmus, Derek James, William James	5	3	0	2	77	66	6	+11
4	(United States) Richard Broad, Jack Behling, Neil Furman	5	3	0	2	83	90	6	-7
5	(Brazil) Mercantonio Fabra, Fabo Melo, Ascendino Melo	5	2	0	3	77	87	4	-10
6	(Samoa) Talaimanu Keti, John Silva, Iremia Leautuli	5	0	0	5	51	117	0	-66

=== Section 3 ===
Pos	Player	P	W	D	L	F	A	Pts	Diff
1	(Zimbabwe) Denis Streak, Chinky Marillier, Richie Hayden	5	4	1	0	110	65	9	+45
2	(Jersey) Alan Shaw, Lee Nixon, David Le Marquand	5	3	1	1	116	72	7	+44
3	(Scotland) Jim McIntyre, Willie Wood, David Peacock	5	3	0	2	101	61	6	+40
4	(Malaysia) Ramble Dallan Rice-Oxley, Fairul Izwan Abd Muin, Mohamed Aziz Maswadi	5	2	0	3	85	99	4	-14
5	(Spain) Matt Tew, Stephen McManus, John Sullivan	5	1	0	4	63	98	2	-35
6	(Japan) Hiroyuki Oda, Stephen Wedge, Makoto Yamada	5	1	0	4	54	134	2	-180

=== Section 4 ===
Pos	Player	P	W	D	L	F	A	Pts	Diff
1	(England) Mervyn King, Robert Newman, Andy Thomson	5	4	0	1	123	67	8	+56
2	Jonathan Ross, Jeremy Henry, Neil Booth	5	4	0	1	98	49	8	+49
3	(Kenya) Andrew Jones, Kiernan Day, Ian Stamp	5	3	0	2	81	76	6	+5
4	(Wales) Neil Rees, Dai Wilkins, Will Thomas	5	2	0	3	108	79	4	+29
5	(Fiji) Shushil Deo Sharma, Rajnish Lal, Keshwa Goundar	5	2	0	3	73	105	4	-32
6	(Norfolk Island) Warren Cranston, Noel Rawlinson, Philip Billman	5	0	0	5	47	154	0	-107

== Championship round ==
=== Section 1 ===
Pos	Player	P	W	D	L	F	A	Pts
1	New Zealand	5	5	0	0	120	60	10
2	Ireland	5	4	0	1	84	71	8
3	South Africa	5	2	0	3	101	65	4
4	Philippines	5	2	0	3	76	96	4
5	Jersey	5	2	0	3	79	103	4
6	Kenya	5	0	0	5	58	123	0

=== Section 2 ===
Pos	Player	P	W	D	L	F	A	Pts
1	Scotland	5	5	0	0	90	55	10
2	England	5	3	0	2	88	68	6
3	Zimbabwe	5	3	0	2	87	81	6
4	Australia	5	2	0	3	85	90	4
5	(Eswatini) Swaziland	5	1	0	4	87	100	2
6	Hong Kong	5	1	0	4	60	103	2

== Bronze medal match ==
England beat Ireland 23–10.

== Gold medal match ==
Scotland beat New Zealand 15–11.

== Results ==
Men's triples section 1
Round 1 – Jul 24		
Hong Kong	Namibia	18–12
Canada	Israel	22–16
New Zealand	Philippines	18–18
Round 2 – Jul 24		
Canada	Philippines	18–16
Israel	Hong Kong	28–21
Namibia	New Zealand	18–11
Round 3 – Jul 25		
Namibia	Canada	19–17
Philippines	Israel	22–13
New Zealand	Hong Kong	19–10
Round 4 – Jul 25		
Hong Kong	Philippines	17–13
Israel	Namibia	23–12
New Zealand	Canada	25–15
Round 5 – Jul 26		
Hong Kong	Canada	18–6
Philippines	Namibia	23–9
New Zealand	Israel	26–10

Men's triples section 2
Round 1 – Jul 24		
Australia	Samoa	20–11
South Africa	(Eswatini) Swaziland	24–6
United States	Brazil	22–16
Round 2 – Jul 24		
Brazil	Australia	16–12
South Africa	United States	28–9
(Eswatini) Swaziland	Samoa	23–8
Round 3 – Jul 25		
United States	Australia	15–14
South Africa	Samoa	24–9
(Eswatini) Swaziland	Brazil	19–10
Round 4 – Jul 25		
Australia	(Eswatini) Swaziland	16–11
South Africa	Brazil	25–14
United States	Samoa	29–14
Round 5 – Jul 26		
Australia	South Africa	19–17
United States	(Eswatini) Swaziland	8–18
Brazil	Samoa	21–9

Men's triples section 3
Round 1 – Jul 24		
Jersey	Spain	25–10
Scotland	Japan	30–5
Zimbabwe	Malaysia	31–15
Round 2 – Jul 24		
Japan	Malaysia	20–15
Scotland	Spain	23–8
Zimbabwe	Jersey	19–19
Round 3 – Jul 25		
Malaysia	Spain	21–12
Jersey	Scotland	18–15
Zimbabwe	Japan	29–7
Round 4 – Jul 25		
Jersey	Japan	39–10
Scotland	Malaysia	21–16
Zimbabwe	Spain	17–12
Round 5 – Jul 26		
Malaysia	Jersey	18–15
Scotland	Zimbabwe	12–14
Japan	Spain	12–21

Men's triples section 4
Round 1 – Jul 24		
Kenya	Fiji	18–8
Ireland	Norfolk Island	30–5
England	Wales	17–13
Round 2 – Jul 24		
England	Norfolk Island	52–5
Ireland	Kenya	15–12
Wales	Fiji	31–14
Round 3 – Jul 25		
England	Kenya	20–14
Fiji	Ireland	13–12
Wales	Norfolk Island	32–7
Round 4 – Jul 25		
Ireland	England	21–5
Fiji	Norfolk Island	24–15
Kenya	Wales	21–18
Round 5 – Jul 26		
Kenya	Norfolk Island	16–15
Ireland	Wales	20–14
England	Fiji	29–14

men's triples Championship Section A
Round 1 – Jul 26		
New Zealand	South Africa	19–15
Ireland	Jersey	18–14
Philippines	Kenya	19–10
Round 2 – Jul 27		
New Zealand	Jersey	26–13
Ireland	Kenya	16–15
South Africa	Philippines	30–8
Round 3 – Jul 27		
South Africa	Kenya	33–8
New Zealand	Ireland	22–14
Philippines	Jersey	27–7
Round 4 – Jul 28		
New Zealand	Philippines	26–9
Jersey	Kenya	28–16
Ireland	South Africa	13–7
Round 5 – Jul 28		
Ireland	Philippines	23–13
Jersey	South Africa	17–16
New Zealand	Kenya	27–9

men's triples Championship Section B
Round 1 – Jul 26		
Zimbabwe	England	14–13
Australia	Hong Kong	17–10
Scotland	(Eswatini) Swaziland	19–15
Round 2 – Jul 27		
Zimbabwe	Hong Kong	27–12
Scotland	Australia	27–6
England	(Eswatini) Swaziland	17–16
Round 3 – Jul 27		
Scotland	England	15–14
Zimbabwe	Australia	23–16
Hong Kong	(Eswatini) Swaziland	19–18
Round 4 – Jul 28		
(Eswatini) Swaziland	Zimbabwe	28–15
Scotland	Hong Kong	17–12
England	Australia	20–16
Round 5 – Jul 28		
England	Hong Kong	24–7
Australia	(Eswatini) Swaziland	30–10
Scotland	Zimbabwe	17–12
