= 1996 World Outdoor Bowls Championship =

World Outdoor Championships 1996
- 8th World Outdoor Bowls Championships
- Location: Adelaide, Australia (Men's) Royal Leamington Spa, England (Women's)
- Date: 18–31 March 1996 (Men's); 3–18 August 1996 (Women's)
- Category: World Bowls Championship

The 1996 Men's World Outdoor Bowls Championship was held at the Lockleys Bowls Club in Adelaide, Australia, from 18 to 31 March 1996.

The 1996 Women's World Outdoor Bowls Championship was held at Victoria Park, Leamington Spa, England from 3 to 18 August 1996.

== Medallists ==
Event	Gold	Silver	Bronze	Bronze
Men's singles	(England); Tony Allcock	(Israel); Jeff Rabkin	(Australia); Kelvin Kerkow	(Scotland); Richard Corsie
Men's pairs	(Republic of Ireland); Sammy Allen; Jeremy Henry	(Scotland); Richard Corsie; Alex Marshall	(Wales); Robert Weale; Will Thomas	(Australia); Cameron Curtis; Rex Johnston
Men's triples	(Scotland); George Adrain; Kenny Logan; Willie Wood	(New Zealand); Peter Belliss; Andrew Curtain; David File	(South Africa); Theuns Fraser; Ashley van Winkel; Kevin Campbell	(Australia); Kelvin Kerkow; Ian Taylor; Stephen Anderson
Men's fours	(England); Andy Thomson; Brett Morley; David Cutler; John Bell	(Wales); Chris Blake; Jason Davies; Will Thomas; Robert Weale	(Australia); Ian Taylor; Cameron Curtis; Rex Johnston; Stephen Anderson	(New Zealand); Andrew Curtain; David File; Gary Lawson; Peter Belliss
Men's team	Scotland			N/A
Women's singles	(Norfolk Island); Carmen Anderson	(England); Wendy Line	(Scotland); Joyce Lindores	N/A
Women's pairs	(Republic of Ireland); Margaret Johnston; Phillis Nolan	(Jersey); Jean Jones; Sheila Syvret	(Fiji); Litia Tikoisuva; Radhika Prasad	N/A
Women's triples	(South Africa); Jannie de Beer; Barbara Redshaw; Hester Bekker	(Australia); Margaret Sumner; Gordana Baric; Daphne Shaw	(Wales); Ann Sutherland; Judith Wason; Betty Morgan	N/A
Women's fours	(Australia); Gordana Baric; Marilyn Peddell; Margaret Sumner; Daphne Shaw	(South Africa); Jannie de Beer; Marge Ellis; Barbara Redshaw; Lorna Trigwell; Hester Bekker	(England); Norma Shaw; Gill Fitzgerald; Mary Price; Jean Baker	N/A
Women's team	South Africa	England	Scotland	N/A

== Results ==
=== Men's singles – round robin ===
Section A

Pos	Player	P	W	L	F	A	Pts	Shots
1	(England) Tony Allcock	6	6	0	150	90	12	+60
2	(Hong Kong) Noel Kennedy	6	5	1	149	100	10	+49
3	(Argentina) Jose Riveros	6	3	3	132	106	6	+26
4	(Kenya) Oliver Fowler	6	3	3	124	123	6	+1
5	(Fiji) Panipasa Matailevu	6	2	4	106	134	4	-28
6	(Samoa) Faimanu Amituanai	6	2	4	103	139	4	-36
7	(Thailand) Thira Mathai	6	0	6	78	150	0	-72

Section B

Pos	Player	P	W	L	F	A	Pts	Shots
1	(Scotland) Richard Corsie	7	6	1	173	93	12	+80
2	(New Zealand) Rowan Brassey	7	6	1	159	98	12	+61
3	(Republic of Ireland) Sammy Allen	7	5	2	162	117	10	+45
4	(Guernsey) Jonathan Queripel	7	5	2	145	142	10	+3
5	(Norfolk Island) Barry Wilson	7	3	4	132	141	6	-9
6	(Eswatini) Allan Thomas	7	2	5	104	163	4	-59
7	(Zambia) Jacob Vanderventer	7	1	6	108	170	2	-62
8	(Brazil) Patrick Knight	7	0	7	116	175	0	-59

Section C

Pos	Player	P	W	L	F	A	Pts	Shots
1	(Israel) Jeff Rabkin	7	6	1	173	118	12	+55
2	(South Africa) Neil Burkett	7	6	1	164	111	12	+53
3	(Namibia) Douw Calitz	7	4	3	163	129	8	+34
4	(Canada) Mark Gilliland	7	4	3	148	128	8	+20
5	(Botswana) Arthur Hicks	7	4	3	159	151	8	+8
6	(Papua New Guinea) J Poyep Pomaleau	7	2	5	125	157	4	-32
7	(Malaysia) Z Baba	7	2	5	107	156	4	-49
8	(Singapore) Hon Yoong Chai	7	0	7	86	175	0	-89

Section D

Pos	Player	P	W	L	F	A	Pts	Shots
1	(Australia) Kelvin Kerkow	6	6	0	150	82	12	+68
2	(Zimbabwe) Mark McCormick	6	5	1	144	90	10	+54
3	(Wales) John Price	6	4	2	136	106	8	+30
4	(Jersey) David Le Marquand	6	3	3	130	116	6	+14
5	(Cook Islands) Pita Totoo	6	2	4	97	134	4	-37
6	(Malawi) P Shaw	6	1	5	100	139	2	-39
7	(United States) Tom Dion	6	0	6	60	150	0	-72

Finals

Semifinals
(England) Allcock	25
(Australia) Kerkow	21
(Israel) Rabkin	25
(Scotland) Corsie	16

Gold medal
(England) Allcock	25
(Israel) Rabkin	15

=== Men's pairs – round robin ===
Section A

Pos	Player	P	W	D	L	F	A	Pts	Shots
1	(Scotland) Richard Corsie & Alex Marshall	7	7	0	0	180	111	14	+69
2	(South Africa) Donald Piketh & Neil Burkett	7							
3	Norfolk Island	7							
4	Namibia	7							
5	(Argentina) Sebastian Sanchez Keenan & Jose Riveros	7							
6	(Israel) George Kaminsky & Chaim Miller	7							
7	Western Samoa	7							
8	Malawi	7	1	0	6	97	199	2	-102

Section B

Pos	Player	P	W	D	L	F	A	Pts	Shots
1	(Republic of Ireland) Sammy Allen & Jeremy Henry	6	5	0	1	167	85	10	+82
2	(New Zealand) Rowan Brassey & Gary Lawson	6							
3	(Hong Kong) Noel Kennedy & Willie Lai	6							
4	Kenya	6	2	1	3	97	130	5	-33
5	(Cook Islands) Inatio Akaruru & Another	6	2	0	4	92	150	4	-58
6	(United States) Jack Behling & Tom Dion	6							
7	Malaysia	6							

Section C

Pos	Player	P	W	D	L	F	A	Pts	Shots
1	(Wales) Robert Weale & Will Thomas	6							
2	Jersey	6							
3	Canada	6							
4	(Eswatini) Swaziland	6							
5	Zimbabwe	6							
6	Papua New Guinea	6							
7	Thailand	6	1	0	5	92	176	2	-84

Section D

Pos	Player	P	W	D	L	F	A	Pts	Shots
1	(Australia) Cameron Curtis & Rex Johnston	7							
2	(England) Tony Allcock & Andy Thomson	7							
3	(Fiji) Panipasa Matailevu & Caucau Turagabeci	7							
4	Singapore	7							
5	(Guernsey) Jon Queripel & Bernie Simon	7							
6	Botswana	7							
7	(Brazil) Andre Luiz Binello & Garoldo Sa Campos	7							
8	(Zambia) Jacob Vanderventer & Arthur Kayesa	7							

Finals

Semifinals
Scotland	22
Australia	11
(Republic of Ireland) Ireland	17
Wales	12

Gold medal
Scotland	19
(Republic of Ireland) Ireland	21

=== Men's triples – round robin ===
Section A

Pos	Player	P	W	D	L	F	A	Pts	Shots
1	(Australia) Kelvin Kerkow, Ian Taylor, Stephen Anderson	6	6	0	0	132	64	12	+68
2	(Israel) Jeff Rabkin, Leon Blum & Lawrence Mendelsohn	6	5	0	1	128	73	10	+55
3	(United States) Skippy Arculli, Jack Lucey & Michael Siddall	6	3	1	2	113	96	7	+17
4	Namibia	6	2	1	3	121	99	5	+22
5	Guernsey	6	2	0	4	90	111	4	-21
6	Singapore	6	1	0	5	86	129	2	-43
7	Kenya	6	1	0	5	59	157	2	-98

Section B

Pos	Player	P	W	D	L	F	A	Pts	Shots
1	(South Africa) Theuns Fraser, Ashley van Winkel, Kevin Campbell	7	6	0	1	177	85	12	+92
2	(Republic of Ireland) Ian McClure, Gary McCloy & Noel Graham	7	6	0	1	180	90	12	+90
3	Wales	7	5	0	2	180	107	10	+73
4	(Eswatini) Swaziland	7	3	0	4	83	122	6	-39
5	Malaysia	7	2	1	4	108	111	5	-3
6	Argentina	7	2	1	4	96	133	5	-37
7	Cook Islands	7	2	0	5	96	147	4	-51
8	Thailand	7	1	0	6	80	205	2	-125

Section C

Pos	Player	P	W	D	L	F	A	Pts	Shots
1	(Scotland) George Adrain, Kenny Logan, Willie Wood	6	6	0	0	133	57	12	+76
2	Canada	6	4	1	1	116	87	9	+29
3	Jersey	6	3	1	2	109	95	7	+14
4	Brazil	6	3	0	3	96	105	6	-9
5	Botswana	6	3	0	3	99	110	6	-11
6	Zambia	6	1	0	5	85	124	2	-39
7	Western Samoa	6	0	0	6	79	139	0	-60

Section D

Pos	Player	P	W	D	L	F	A	Pts	Shots
1	(New Zealand) Peter Belliss, Andrew Curtain, David File	7	7	0	0			14	
2	(England) Brett Morley, David Cutler & John Bell	7	6	0	1	141	101	12	+40
3	Fiji	7	5	0	2	155	110	10	+45
4	(Hong Kong) Mel Stewart, Ken Wallis & Danny Ho	7	3	0	4	148	107	6	+41
5	(Zimbabwe) Hilton Marillos, Michael McNeill & Cedric Edwards	7	3	0	4			6	
6	Norfolk Island	7	2	0	5	84	118	4	-34
7	Papua New Guinea	7	2	0	5	91	130	4	-39
8	Malawi	7	0	0	7	60	218	0	-158

Finals

Semifinals
Scotland	23
South Africa	11
New Zealand	18
Australia	17

Gold medal
Scotland	26
New Zealand	5

=== Men's fours – round robin ===
Section A

Pos	Player	P	W	D	L	F	A	Pts	Shots
1	(Australia) Ian Taylor, Cameron Curtis, Rex Johnston, Stephen Anderson	7	6	0	1	191	96	12	+95
2	Scotland	7	6	0	1	189	111	12	+78
3	(Republic of Ireland) Noel Graham, Jeremy Henry, Ian McClure, Gary McCloy	7	5	1	1	181	115	11	+66
4	Zimbabwe	7	4	0	3	142	129	8	+13
5	Jersey	7	3	0	4	166	124	6	+42
6	Malawi	7	2	0	5	96	209	4	-113
7	(Cook Islands) Inatio Akaruru	7	1	1	5	105	181	3	-76
8	Singapore	7	0	0	7	82	187	0	-105

Section B

Pos	Player	P	W	D	L	F	A	Pts	Shots
1	(New Zealand) Andrew Curtain, David File, Gary Lawson, Peter Belliss	6	4	0	2	151	99	8	+52
2	(Hong Kong) Willie Lai, Mel Stewart, Ken Wallis & Danny Ho	6	4	0	2	126	111	8	+15
3	Namibia	6	4	0	2	118	114	8	+4
4	Canada	6	3	1	2	121	112	7	+9
5	Papua New Guinea	6	3	0	3	112	117	6	-5
6	(Norfolk Island) John Christian, Graeme Forsyth, Sid Cooper, Garry Ryan	6	2	1	3	112	120	5	-8
7	Brazil	6	0	0	6	94	161	0	-67

Section C

Pos	Player	P	W	D	L	F	A	Pts	Shots
1	(England) Andy Thomson, Brett Morley, David Cutler & John Bell	7	7	0	0	280	87	14	+143
2	South Africa	7	5	0	2			10	
3	Guernsey	7	5	0	2	149	134	10	+15
4	Malaysia	7	4	0	3	150	134	8	+14
5	(Eswatini) Swaziland	7	4	0	3	156	145	8	+11
6	Botswana	7	2	0	5	122	170	4	-48
7	Kenya	7	1	0	6	105	183	2	-78
8	Thailand	7	0	0	7			0	

Section D

Pos	Player	P	W	D	L	F	A	Pts	Shots
1	(Wales) Chris Blake, Jason Davies, Will Thomas, Robert Weale	6	6	0	0	185	87	12	+98
2	Israel	6	4	0	2	142	100	8	+42
3	Fiji	6	3	0	3	136	107	6	+29
4	(United States) Jack Behling, Skippy Arculli, Jack Lucey & Michael Siddall	6	3	0	3	111	118	6	-7
5	Western Samoa	6	3	0	3	92	158	6	-66
6	Argentina	6	2	0	4	136	131	4	+5
7	Zambia	6	0	0	6	90	191	0	-101

Finals

Semifinals
England	26
New Zealand	16
Wales	23
Australia	22

Gold medal
England	20
Wales	9

=== Women's singles – round robin ===
Section A

Pos	Player	P	W	L	F	A	Pts	Shots
1	(England) Wendy Line	15						
2	(Scotland) Joyce Lindores	15						
3	(Republic of Ireland) Margaret Johnston	15						
4	(Botswana) Babs Anderson	15						
5	(Fiji) Litia Tikoisuva	15						
6	(Zambia) Matimba Like	15						
7	(New Zealand) Judy Howat	15						
8	(Malaysia) Nor Hashimah Ismail	15						
9	(Zimbabwe) Cora Howard-Williams	15						
10	(Israel) Merle Swerdlow	15						
11	(Cook Islands) Dorothy Paniani	15						
12	(Namibia) Jean Joubert	15						
13	(Kenya) Maureen Burns	15						
14	(Netherlands) Marie Taylor	15						
15	(Argentina) Maria Vasquez	15						
16	(United States) Regina Banares	15						

Section B

Pos	Player	P	W	L	F	A	Pts	Shots
1	(Norfolk Island) Carmen Anderson	13						
2	(Wales) Rita Jones	13						
3	(Australia) Willow Fong	13						
4	(South Africa) Jo Peacock	13						
5	(Guernsey) Anne Simon	13						
6	(Eswatini) Liz James	13						
7	(Canada) Anita Nivala	13						
8	(Jersey) Val Stead	13						
9	(Hong Kong) Angela Chau	13						
10	(Papua New Guinea) Lady Karina Okuk	13						
11	(Samoa) Manuia Porter	13						
12	(Singapore) Rita Pereira	13						
13	(Spain) Dorrien Ives	13						
14	(Japan) N Yoshimoto	13						

Bronze medal match
(Scotland) Lindores bt (Wales) Jones 25-4

Gold medal match
(Norfolk Island) Anderson bt (England) Line 25-9

=== Women's pairs – round robin ===
Section A

Pos	Player	P	W	D	L	F	A	Pts	Shots
1	(Republic of Ireland) Margaret Johnston & Phillis Nolan	15							
2	(South Africa) Jo Peacock & Lorna Trigwell	15							
3	Papua New Guinea	15							
4	Zimbabwe	15							
5	(Wales) Rita Jones & Ann Dainton	15							
6	Norfolk Island	15							
7	Cook Islands	15							
8	Israel	15							
9	Namibia	15							
10	(Eswatini) Swaziland	15							
11	Zambia	15							
12	(Hong Kong) Linda Smith & Rosemary Allen	15							
13	Spain	15							
14	Argentina	15							
15	Netherlands	15							
16	Japan	15							

Section B

Pos	Player	P	W	D	L	F	A	Pts	Shots
1	(Jersey) Jean Jones & Sheila Syvret	14							
2	(Fiji) Litia Tikoisuva & Radhika Prasad	14							
3	(Scotland) Julie Forrest & Joyce Lindores	14							
4	(England) Norma Shaw, Mavis Wellington+, Gill Fitzgerald	14							
5	(Australia) Marilyn Peddell & Willow Fong	14							
6	Canada	14							
7	(Guernsey) Anne Simon & Jean Simon	14							
8	(United States) Heather Lewis & Kottia Spangler	14							
9	New Zealand	14							
10	Kenya	14							
11	Botswana	14							
12	Malaysia	14							
13	Western Samoa	14							
14	Singapore	14							
15	(India) Jeanette Lewis & Shashe Chabra	14							

+ Replacement

Bronze medal match
Fiji bt South Africa 28-17

Gold medal match
(Republic of Ireland) Ireland bt Jersey 21-19

=== Women's triples – round robin ===
Section A

Pos	Player	P	W	D	L	F	A	Pts	Shots
1	(South Africa) Jannie de Beer, Barbara Redshaw, Hester Bekker	14							
2	(England) Wendy Line, Jean Baker, Mary Price	14							
3	(Scotland) Margaret Letham, Betty Forsyth, Sarah Gourlay	14							
4	(Guernsey) Jean Martel, Jennifer Nicolle & Sally Paul	14							
5	Namibia	14							
6	(Eswatini) Swaziland	14							
7	Zambia	14							
8	Cook Islands	14							
9	Canada	14							
10	United States	14							
11	Fiji	14							
12	Singapore	14							
13	Malaysia	14							
14	Kenya	14							
15	Spain	14							

Section B

Pos	Player	P	W	D	L	F	A	Pts	Shots
1	(Australia) Margaret Sumner, Gordana Baric, Daphne Shaw	14							
2	(Wales) Ann Sutherland, Judith Wason, Betty Morgan	14							
3	Botswana	14							
4	New Zealand	14							
5	(Jersey) Sue Noel, Karina Horman & Val Stead	14							
6	Israel	14							
7	(Hong Kong) Rosemary McMahon, Elizabeth Li & Angela Chau	14							
8	(Republic of Ireland) Pauline Mackie, Helen Taylor & Christine O'Gorman	14							
9	Papua New Guinea	14							
10	Norfolk Island	14							
11	Argentina	14							
12	Netherlands	14							
13	India	14							
14	Western Samoa	14							
15	Japan	14							

Bronze medal match
Wales bt England 17-14

Gold medal match
South Africa bt Australia 19-12

=== Women's fours – round robin ===
Section A

Pos	Player	P	W	D	L	F	A	Pts	Shots
1	(South Africa) Jannie de Beer, Marge Ellis+, Barbara Redshaw, Lorna Trigwell, Hester Bekker	14							
2	(England) Norma Shaw, Gill Fitzgerald, Mary Price, Jean Baker	14							
3	(Scotland) Margaret Letham, Julie Forrest, Betty Forsyth & Sarah Gourlay	14							
4	Israel	14							
5	(Eswatini) Swaziland	14							
6	Cook Islands	14							
7	Botswana	14							
8	Zambia	14							
9	(Republic of Ireland) Pauline Mackie, Christine O'Gorman, Helen Taylor & Phillis Nolan	14							
10	(Hong Kong) Rosemary McMahon, Linda Smith, Elizabeth Li & Rosemary Allen	14							
11	Singapore	14							
12	United States	14							
13	Kenya	14							
14	Netherlands	14							
15	Malaysia	14							

+ Replacement

Section B

Pos	Player	P	W	D	L	F	A	Pts	Shots
1	(Australia) Gordana Baric, Marilyn Peddell, Margaret Sumner, Daphne Shaw	14							
2	(New Zealand) Millie Khan, Bett Prattley, Marie Watson & Marlene Castle	14							
3	(Wales) Ann Sutherland, Ann Dainton, Judith Wason & Betty Morgan	14							
4	(Jersey) Sue Noel, Karina Horman, Jean Jones & Sheila Syvret	14							
5	(Canada) Alice Duncalf, Jean Roney, Maureen Thompson & Noreen Welsh	14							
6	Fiji	14							
7	Papua New Guinea	14							
8	Spain	14							
9	Norfolk Island	14							
10	Namibia	14							
11	(Guernsey) Jean Simon, Jean Martel, Sally Paul & Jennifer Nicolle	14							
12	India	14							
13	Western Samoa	14							
14	Argentina	14							
15	Japan	14							

Bronze medal match
England bt New Zealand 24-21

Gold medal match
Australia bt South Africa 18-15

=== Taylor Trophy ===
Pos	Team	Singles	Pairs	Triples	Fours	Total
1	South Africa	24	28	30	29	111
2	England	29	25	27	28	109
3	Scotland	28	27	26	26	107
4	Australia	25	22	29	30	106
5	Wales	27	23	28	25	103
6	Jersey	16	30	21	23	90
7	(Republic of Ireland) Ireland	26	31	15	14	86
8	New Zealand	18	15	24	27	84
9	Fiji	22	29	10	20	79
10	Botswana	23	10	25	18	76
11	Norfolk Island	30	21	11	13	75
12	Guernsey	21	19	23	10	73
13	Canada	17	20	13	22	72
14	Israel	11	17	20	24	72
15	(Eswatini) Swaziland	20	12	19	21	72
16	Papua New Guinea	12	26	14	17	69
17	Zambia	19	11	18	16	64
18	Cook Islands	10	18	16	19	63
19	Namibia	7	14	22	11	54
20	Hong Kong	13	8	17	12	50
21	Zimbabwe	14	24	0	0	38
