= Wales at the 1998 Commonwealth Games =

Wales at the 1988 Commonwealth Games
- CG code: WAL
- CGA: Wales at the Commonwealth Games
- Website: teamwales.cymru

in Kuala Lumpur, Malaysia
- Medals Ranked 10th: Gold 3 Silver 4 Bronze 8 Total 15

Commonwealth Games appearances (overview)
- 1930; 1934; 1938; 1950; 1954; 1958; 1962; 1966; 1970; 1974; 1978; 1982; 1986; 1990; 1994; 1998; 2002; 2006; 2010; 2014; 2018; 2022; 2026; 2030

Wales competed at the 1998 Commonwealth Games in Kuala Lumpur, Malaysia, from 11 to 21 September 1998.

Wales came 10th overall with 3 gold, 4 silver and 8 bronze medals.

== Medals ==
(gold)	(silver)	(bronze)	Total	
WAL	3	4	8	15

== Medallists ==
=== Gold ===
- Desmond Davies (Shooting, skeet individual)
- Kelly Morgan (Badminton, singles)
- Iwan Thomas (Athletics, 400 metres)

=== Silver ===
- Christian Malcolm (Athletics, 200 metres)
- Dave Morgan (Weightlifting, 77 kg snatch)
- John Price (Lawn bowls, singles)
- Robert Weale & Will Thomas (Lawn bowls, pairs)

=== Bronze ===
- Kevin Evans (Boxing, Heavyweight 91kg)
- Alex Gough (Squash, singles)
- Tony Morgan (weightlifter, 69 kg snatch)
- Shaun Pickering (Athletics, shot put)
- Jamie Baulch, Matthew Elias, Paul Gray, Iwan Thomas (Athletics, 4 x 400 metres relay)
- Rita Jones & Ann Sutherland (Lawn bowls, pairs)
- Dai Wilkins, Ian Slade, Mark Anstey, Neil Rees (Lawn bowls, fours)
- David Davies & Christopher Hockley (Shooting, Fullbore rifle open pair)

== Team and sports ==
=== Athletics ===
Athlete	Event/s	Notes
Phil Banning	n/a	Coach
Jamie Baulch	400 metres, 4×400m relay	
Nigel Bevan	Javelin	
Steve Brace	Marathon	
Rhian Clarke	Pole vault	
Julie Crane	High jump	
Delyth Davies	n/a	Manager
Emma Davies	800 metres	
Mike Delaney	n/a	Manager
Matthew Elias	400 metres hurdle, 4×400m relay	
Paul Gray	110 metres hurdles, 4×400m relay	
Jamie Henthorn	100/200 metres, 4×100 metres relay	
Rachel King	100 metres hurdles	
Angharad Mair	Marathon	
Christian Malcolm	100, 200 metres, 4×100 metres relay	
Sarah Moore	Hammer throw	
Hayley Nash	10,000 metres	
Rachel Newcombe	800 metres	
Lee Newman	Discus	
Shaun Pickering	shot put	
Dale Rixon	Marathon	
Philippa Roles	discus	
Christan Stephenson	1500 metres	
Adrian Thomas	n/a	Coach
Iwan Thomas	400 metres, 4×400m relay	
Doug Turner	200 metres, 4×100 metres relay	
Kevin Williams	100 metres, 4×100 metres relay	

=== Badminton ===
Men

Athlete	Event/s	Notes
Michael Ford	n/a	Manager
Andrew Groves-Burke	doubles, mixed, team	Cardiff
Matthew Hughes	doubles, team	Llanfairfechan
Geraint Lewis	singles, doubles, team	Beddau
John Leung	singles, doubles, mixed, team	Birmingham
Chris Rees	n/a	Coach
Richard Vaughan	singles, team	Llanfairfechan

Women

Athlete	Event/s	Notes
Robyn Ashworth	doubles, mixed, team	Newport
Natasha Groves-Burke	singles, doubles, mixed, team	Cardiff
Katy Howell	singles, doubles, team	Swansea
Kelly Morgan	singles, team	Tonteg
Gail Osborne	singles, doubles, team	Beddau

=== Boxing ===
Athlete	Event/s	Club
Steven Donaldson	light-heavyweight 81kg	Highfields ABC, Cardiff
Kevin Evans	heavyweight 91kg	Carmarthen ABC
Ceri Hall	lightweight 60kg	Penyrheol ABC, Swansea
Darren Hayde	flyweight 51kg	Splott Adventure ABC, Cardiff
Sean Pepperall	middleweight 75kg	Vale ABC, Cardiff
Karl Thomas	welterweight 67kg	Pontypridd ABC

=== Cycling ===
Athlete	Event/s	Notes
Matthew Beckett		
Matt Cosgrove		
Paul Esposti		
Clare Greewnood		
Louise Jones		
Phil Jones		
Sion Jones		
Anthony Malarczyk		
Megan Hughes	24km points	
Alvn Owen		
Matthew Postle		
Ceri Pritchard		
Huw Pritchard	40km points	
Dave Rand		
Paul Sheppard	40km points	
Shane Sutton		
Simon Taylor		
Chris Williams		
Julian Winn		

=== Diving ===
Athlete	Event/s	Notes
Robert Morgan	Platform	

=== Field Hockey ===
Men

Athlete	Event/s	Notes
Chris Ashcroft	Team	Cannock HC
David Bunyan	n/a	Coach
Alistair Carruthers	Team	Canterbury HC
Anthony Colclough	Team	Teddington HC
Paul Edwards	Team	Cannock HC
Graeme Egan	Team	Bournville HC
Martin Gilbody	n/a	Manager
Owen Griffiths-Jones	Team	Hounslow HC
Andrew Grimes	Team	Southgate HC
David Hacker	Team	Canterbury HC
Ian Hughes-Rowlands	Team	Cannock HC
Zak Jones	Team	Hounslow HC
Martin Lindley	Team	
Richard Markham	Team	Guildford HC
Tyrone Moore	Team	Whitchurch HC
Clive O'Sullivan	Team	Isca HC
Simon Organ	Team	Cannock HC
Kevin Priday	Team	Guildford HC, goalkeeper
Jamie Westerman	Team	Stourport HC
Michael Williamson	Team	Hounslow HC

Women

Athlete	Event/s	Notes
Ann Bevan	Team	Penarth HC
Michelle Daltry	Team	Colwyn Bay HC
Margaret Edwards	n/a	Manager
Louise Ellis	Team	Clifton HC
Emma James	Team	Swansea HC
Caroline Jones	Team	Newtown HC
Margaret Medlow	n/a	Coach
Charlotte Merrett	Team	Sutton Coldfield HC
Rachel O'Brien	Team	Clifton HC
Sarah Powell	Team	Swansea HC
Michelle Robertson	Team	Clifton HC
Kate Thomas	Team	Loughborough Students' HC
Michelle Thomas	Team	Colwyn Bay HC
Rachel Thomas	Team	Colwyn Bay HC
Lynda Watkin	Team	Capt, Swansea HC
Annie Williams	Team	Hampstead & Westminster HC
Justine Williams	Team	Leicester HC
Lauren Williams	Team	Hampstead & Westminster HC

=== Gymnastics ===
Athlete	Event/s	Notes
Neil Burton		
Joanne Coombs		
Jeanette Cotter		Rhythmic gymnastics
Garath Davies		
David Eaton		
Jennifer Maonton Gardiner	all-round	Rhythmic
Garath Irwin		
Sue John		
Natalie Lucitt		
Emma Macleoad		
Papul Morris		
Tanline Mortimer		
Michelle Parker		
Colin Still		
Tason Wink		

=== Lawn bowls ===
Men

Athlete	Events	Club
Mark Anstey	fours	Beaufort BC
John Price	singles	Aberavon BC
Neil Rees	fours	Parc-y-Dre BC, Llanelli
Ian Slade	fours	Pontyminster BC
Will Thomas	pairs	Pontrhydyfen BC
Robert Weale	pairs	Presteigne BC
Dai Wilkins	fours	Pontrhydyfen

Women

Athlete	Events	Club
Rita Jones	pairs	Gilfach Bargoed BC
Sarah Mansbridge	fours	Saundersfoot BC
Gill Miles	fours	Sophia Gardens BC
Betty Morgan	fours	Llandrindod Wells BC
Kathy Pearce	fours	Berriew BC
Ann Sutherland	pairs	Croesyceiliog BC
Judith Wason	singles	Cardiff BC

=== Netball ===
Squad

- Janet Allen
- Ceri Battle
- Dawn Donovan
- Mair Evans
- Clare Hawkins
- Kara Jackson
- Claire Kendrick
- Elizabeth Rees
- Pamela Walker
- Helen Weston

Summary

Wales finished 9th in the netball at the 1998 Commonwealth Games. In the group stages, they won one and drew one their five matches.

Group B

14 September 1998	Cook Islands	59–59	Wales

15 September 1998	South Africa	66–27	Wales

16 September 1998	New Zealand	94–21	Wales

17 September 1998	Malawi	57–50	Wales

18 September 1998	Wales	63–45	Sri Lanka

Pos	Team	P	W	D	L	GF	GA	GD	Pts
1	New Zealand	5	5	0	0	416	141	+275	10
2	South Africa	5	4	0	1	315	207	+108	8
3	Cook Islands	5	2	1	2	283	330	-47	5
4	Malawi	5	2	0	3	283	270	-13	4
5	Wales	5	1	1	3	220	321	-101	3
6	Sri Lanka	5	0	0	5	157	405	-248	0

Qualified for Semi-final 1
Qualified for Semi-final 2

=== Rugby sevens ===
Athlete	Event/s	Notes
Gareth Cooper	Team	
Scott Gibbs	Team	
Kevin Hopkins	Team	
Rob Howley	Team	
Dafydd James	Team	
Jamie Ringer	Team	
Matthew Robinson	Team	
John Ryan	Team	Coach
Gareth Thomas	Team	
Craig Warlow	Team	
Chris Wyatt	Team	
Gareth Wyatt	Team	

=== Shooting ===
Athlete	Event/s	Notes
Malcolm Allen	Skeet pairs	
James Birkett-Evans	Trap pairs	
Martyn Blake		
Johanne Brekke	smallbore rifle (3 positions) pair, prone pair	
Fred Brown		
Steve Craft	Centre & Rapid fire pistol indiv/pair	
Richard Craven		
David Davies	Fullbore rifle open indiv/pair	
Desmond Davies	skeet individual/pair	
Gwyn Davies		
Robert Davies	Trap pairs	
Stuart Daltry		
Richard Edwards		
David George		
Paul Grey	n/a	Coach
Ian Harris		
Christopher Hockley	Fullbore rifle open indiv/pair	
Julie Malcolm	rifle 3-position indiv/pair, Air rifle pair, prone pair	
Patricia Mumford		
John Osborne		
Steve Pengelly	Centre & Rapid fire pistol indiv/pair	
Terry Wakefield		
Rhian Wyke	Air Rifle Pair	

=== Squash ===
Men

Athlete	Event/s	Notes/club
Matthew Benjamin	singles, men's doubles	St. Mellons Cardiff
Gareth Davies	men's doubles, mixed doubles	St. Mellons Cardiff
Andrew Evans	n/a	Coach
David Evans	singles, men's doubles	Maesteg
Alex Gough	singles, men's doubles	St. Mellons Cardiff
Chris Robertson	n/a	Coach
Greg Tippings	singles, mixed doubles	UWIC, Cardiff

Women

Athlete	Event/s	Notes
Katrina Hogan	Women's doubles, mixed doubles	St. Mellons, Cardiff
Sian Johnson	women's doubles, mixed doubles	Cardiff SC

=== Swimming ===
Men

Athlete	Event/s	Notes
Andre Ayers		
Leighton Coleman		
Martyn Davies		
David Haller	n/a	Coach
Adam Johnson		
Chris Jones		
Mark Jones		
Jonathon Lewis		
Mike Roberts	n/a	Manager
Gary Rosser		
Mike Watkins		

Women

Athlete	Event/s	Notes
Bethan Francis Coole	200m backstroke	
Catrin Davies	50, 100m freestyle	
Suzanne Flook	200m butterfly	
Victoria Hale	50, 200m freestyle	
Sara Hopkins	50, 100m freestyle	
Charlotte Niblett	200m butterfly, 200, 400 medley	
Caroline Warren	100m breaststroke	

=== Tenpin bowling ===
Men

Athlete	Event/s	Notes
Ronald Chamberlain	singles	
Geoff Gladwyn-Ball	singles	

Women

Athlete	Event/s	Notes
Cynthia Fortt	singles	
Tricia Outrim	singles	

=== Weightlifting ===
Athlete	Event/s	Notes
Robert Earwicker	94 kg	
Marius Hardiman	77kg	
Gareth Hives	105 kg	
Alan Lee	n/a	Coach
Dave Morgan	77 kg	
Tony Morgan	69 kg	
Arfon Roberts	69kg	
Jonathan Roberts	94 kg	
Neil Taylor	85kg	
