= Marge =

Marge is a feminine given name, often a shortened form of Marjorie, Margot, or Margaret. Notable people with the name include:

== People ==
- Marge (cartoonist) (1904–1993), pen name of Marjorie Henderson Buell, American cartoonist
- Marge Anderson (1932–2013), Ojibwe Elder and politician for the Mille Lacs Band of Ojibwe
- Marge Anthony (1935–2013), Canadian broadcaster and media executive
- Marge Bishop (1910–1960), New Zealand cricketer
- Marge Burns (1925–2009), American golfer
- Marge Calhoun (1926–2017), American surfer
- Marge Callaghan (1921–2019), American baseball player
- Marge Carey (1938–2012), British trade unionist who served as President of the Union of Shop, Distributive and Allied Workers (USDAW) from 1997 to 2006
- Marge Chadderdon (born 1937), Republican Idaho State Representative
- Marge Champion (1919–2020), American dancer and choreographer
- Marge Ellis (1926–2021), South African lawn bowler
- Marge Frantz (1922–2015), American activist and women's studies academic
- Marge Hurlbert, American aviator
- Marge Kõrkjas (born 1974), Estonian Paralympic swimmer
- Marge Kotlisky (1927–1997), American actress
- Marge Organo, Filipina glass artist
- Marge Ostroushko (born 1951), public radio producer
- Marge Petty, American politician
- Marge Piercy (born 1936), American poet, novelist, and social activist
- Marge Ragona (born 1929), American religious leader and politician
- Marge Redmond (1924–2020), American actress and singer
- Marge Roukema (1929–2014), American politician
- Marge Schott (1928–2004), American baseball team owner
- Marge Shepardson, American politician
- Marge Simon (born 1942), American artist and writer
- Marge Summit (1935–2023), American LGBT activist
- Marge Villa (1924–2023), American utility player in the All-American Girls Professional Baseball League

== Fictional characters ==
- Marge Dursley, in the Harry Potter series
- Marge Green, on the BBC soap opera EastEnders
- Marge Gunderson, from the 1996 film Fargo
- Marge Simpson, on the animated series The Simpsons
- Marge Thompson, in A Nightmare on Elm Street
