= Jason Davis =

Jason Davis may refer to:

- Jason Davis (actor, born 1984), American actor featured in Rush Hour and Recess
- Jason Davis (American actor), American actor known from Prison Break
- Jason Davis (American football) (born 1983), American football fullback
- Jason Davis (baseball) (born 1980), former Major League Baseball pitcher
- Jason Davis (boxer) (born 1982), American boxer, see Joan Guzmán
- Jason Davis (footballer) (born 1984), Bermudian international soccer player
- Jason Davis, aka Jabba (presenter) (born 1973), Australian radio and television personality

== See also ==
- Jay Davis, actor
- Jason Davies, Welsh bowls player
- Jason Vaughan-Davies (born 1974), Zimbabwean cricketer
