= Andrew Curtain =

New Zealand lawn bowls player

Personal information
- Nationality: New Zealander
- Born: 29 December 1967 (age 58) Christchurch
- Employer(s): self employed; Director at Direct Paper Ltd

Sport
- Sport: Lawn bowls
Medal record
Representing New Zealand
World Outdoor Championships
Silver medal – second place	1996 Adelaide	triples
Bronze medal – third place	1996 Adelaide	fours
Gold medal – first place	2000 Johannesburg	triples
Bronze medal – third place	2000 Johannesburg	team
Asia Pacific Bowls Championships
Gold medal – first place	1995 Dunedin	triples
Gold medal – first place	1995 Dunedin	fours
Gold medal – first place	1997 Warilla	triples
Gold medal – first place	1997 Warilla	fours
Bronze medal – third place	1999 Kuala Lumpur	singles

Andrew Curtain (born 1967) is a former New Zealand international lawn bowls player.

== Bowls career ==
Curtain won two medals at the 1996 World Outdoor Bowls Championship; a silver in the triples and a bronze in the fours.

He won the gold medal with Rowan Brassey and Peter Belliss in the men's triples at the 2000 World Outdoor Bowls Championship in Johannesburg.

Curtain also represented New Zealand at the 2002 Commonwealth Games.

He won five medals at the Asia Pacific Bowls Championships of which four were gold.

He won the 1997 & 2008 pairs title and the 1993, 1994, 1996, 1997 & 2004 fours title at the New Zealand National Bowls Championships when bowling for the various bowls clubs.
