= Marge Ellis =

South African lawn bowler (1926–2021)

Personal information
- Nationality: South African
- Born: 10 August 1926
- Died: 30 December 2021 (aged 96)

Sport
- Club: Hillary BC & Port Natal
Medal record
Representing South Africa
World Outdoor Championships
Silver medal – second place	1996 Leamington Spa	fours
Gold medal – first place	1996 Leamington Spa	team

Marjory Ellis (10 August 1926 – 30 December 2021) was a South African international lawn bowler and national team manager.

== Bowls career ==
Ellis won a silver medal in the fours as an injury replacement bowler, when called in from her managers position, at the 1996 World Outdoor Bowls Championship in Leamington Spa with Jannie de Beer, Barbara Redshaw, Lorna Trigwell and Hester Bekker.

== Later life and death ==
In 2017, Ellis, then aged 91, was honoured by the Hillary Bowling Club.

Ellis died on 30 December 2021, at the age of 95.
