= Steve Glasson =

Australian bowls player

Personal information
- Full name: Stephen John Glasson
- Nickname: Biscuits
- Nationality: Australian
- Born: 10 April 1969 (age 57) Sydney, New South Wales, Australia

Sport
- Sport: Bowls
- Club: St Johns Park Bowling Club
- Now coaching: Australian bowls team

Achievements and titles
- Highest world ranking: 1
Medal record
Representing Australia
World Outdoor Championships
Silver medal – second place	2000 Johannesburg	singles
Silver medal – second place	2000 Johannesburg	triples
Gold medal – first place	2000 Johannesburg	team
Gold medal – first place	2004 Ayr	singles
Asia Pacific Bowls Championships
Silver medal – second place	1995 Dunedin	pairs
Bronze medal – third place	1995 Dunedin	fours
Silver medal – second place	1997 Warilla	fours
Gold medal – first place	1999 Kuala Lumpur	triples
Gold medal – first place	2001 Melbourne	triples
Bronze medal – third place	2001 Melbourne	singles
Bronze medal – third place	2003 Brisbane	pairs
Bronze medal – third place	2005 Melbourne	singles

Stephen John Glasson OAM (born 10 April 1969) is an Australian bowls player. He was number one in the world in 2004 and was ranked first in Australia between 1997 and 2005. He is currently the Australian national bowls coach.

== Early life ==
Glasson was born in Sydney, New South Wales in 1969. His father, Bob Glasson was a former Queensland bowls representative. Glasson took up bowls as a young child in the mid-1970s.

While working as a bank teller as a teenager, his bank was held up. He decided to change jobs, becoming an apprentice greenkeeper at a bowls club.

== Playing career ==
=== World Championships ===
In 2004 Glasson became world singles champion when he won a gold medal at the 2004 World Outdoor Bowls Championship in Scotland, becoming the first Australian to be world number one in men's singles.

=== Asia Pacific Championships ===
He won eight medals at the Asia Pacific Bowls Championships including two gold medals.

=== National ===
Glasson won the Australian National Indoor championship nine times (1994, 1997–1999, 2001–2005). He was the number one ranked player in Australia between 1997 and 2005.

=== Commonwealth Games ===
Glasson competed in the singles at the 1998 Commonwealth Games and 2002 Commonwealth Games. He was omitted from the Australian team for the 2006 Commonwealth Games after a dispute over fitness requirements set down by Bowls Australia. Bowls Australia claimed that poor form had also been a contributory factor.

== Coaching career ==
In 2011 he replaced Rex Johnston as Bowls Australia national coach. In 2012, he only played occasionally to focus on his off-field role as a coach.

== Personal life ==
His son Mitchell is a professional football player.

== Honours ==
In 2000 Glasson was awarded the Australian Sports Medal for his playing and coaching achievements. He was inducted into the Bowls Australia Hall of Fame in 2011. He was further honoured in 2012, awarded the Medal of the Order of Australia (OAM).

=== Other major bowling achievements ===
- 4xNSW Premier League Titles With St Johns Park Bowling Club
- Mazda Jack High Winner-1997
- World Indoor Pairs Semi-Finalist-Twice 1998&2000
- South African Masters Runner Up-1999
