= Paul Richards (bowls) =

Australian lawn bowler

Personal information
- Nationality: Australian
- Died: 1995
Medal record
Representing (Australia)
Asia Pacific Bowls Championships
Silver medal – second place	1991 Kowloon	triples
Silver medal – second place	1991 Kowloon	fours

Paul Richards (died 1995) was an Australian international lawn bowler.

== Bowls career ==
Richards represented Australia from 1986 to 1992. He won double silver at the 1991 Asia Pacific Bowls Championships, held in Kowloon and won the 1986 and 1987 Hong Kong International Bowls Classic singles title.

He took part in the 1992 World Outdoor Bowls Championship.

He was posthumously inducted into the Bowls South Australia Hall of Fame in 2011 (he had died in 1995).
