= Edna Bessell =

English lawn bowler

Personal information
- Nationality: British (English)
- Born: Q3, 1946 (age 79–80) Gloucestershire

Sport
- Club: Yeovil BC
Medal record
Representing England
World Outdoor Championships
Bronze medal – third place	1992 Ayr	Triples
Bronze medal – third place	1992 Ayr	Fours
Atlantic Bowls Championships
Silver medal – second place	1993 Florida	triples
Bronze medal – third place	1993 Florida	fours
Gold medal – first place	2005 Bangor	fours
Bronze medal – third place	2005 Bangor	pairs
Silver medal – second place	2009 Johannesburg	pairs

Edna Ida May Bessell MBE (née Tovey), born 1946, is a former international lawn bowler from England.

== Bowls career ==
She won a bronze medal in the Triples with Barbara Till, Norma Shaw and Babs Barlow at the 1992 World Outdoor Bowls Championship. Barlow was the English president had stepped in to replace the injured Norma Shaw. She also won a second bronze in the fours with Jean Baker, Till and Mary Price.

In 1993 she won the triples silver medal and fours bronze medal at the inaugural Atlantic Bowls Championships.

In 2005 she won the fours gold medal and pairs bronze medal at the Atlantic Championships and in 2009 she won the pairs silver medal at the Atlantic Bowls Championships.

Bessell also won four national singles titles representing Somerset. She later became team manager for England's women and was appointed MBE.
