= Helen Graham (bowler) =

Personal information
- Nationality: Zambia
Medal record
Representing Zambia
World Outdoor Championships
Bronze medal – third place	1992 Ayr	pairs

Helen Graham is a former international lawn bowler from Zambia.

Helen Graham began bowling in 1978 after immigrating there during the same year, she has won the national singles and the Six African States Tournament.

She won a bronze medal in the pairs at the 1992 World Outdoor Bowls Championship in Ayr with Margaret Hughes. She also competed in two Commonwealth Games in 1990 and 1994.
