= Paul Girdler =

New Zealand international lawn bowler

Personal information
- Born: 17 March 1964 (age 62) Edinburgh, New Zealand
- Height: 187 cm (6 ft 2 in)
Medal record
Representing New Zealand
World Outdoor Championships
Bronze medal – third place	2000 Johannesburg	pairs
Bronze medal – third place	2000 Johannesburg	fours
Bronze medal – third place	2000 Johannesburg	team
Silver medal – second place	2004 Ayr	team
Asia Pacific Bowls Championships
Gold medal – first place	2001 Melbourne	pairs
Bronze medal – third place	2001 Melbourne	fours
Silver medal – second place	2003 Brisbane	fours
Gold medal – first place	2015 Christchurch	triples
Gold medal – first place	2015 Christchurch	fours

Paul Girdler (born 1964 in Edinburgh) is a New Zealand international lawn bowler.

== Bowls career ==
In 2000 he won a pairs bronze medal with Russell Meyer at the 2000 World Outdoor Bowls Championship in Johannesburg. He is also a two-time Asia Pacific Championship gold medallist.

He won five medals at the Asia Pacific Bowls Championships, of which three have been gold medals. In 2005, he won the Hong Kong International Bowls Classic singles title, in addition to winning the pairs title in 2002.

He was selected as part of the New Zealand team for the 2018 Commonwealth Games on the Gold Coast in Queensland.
