= Babs Barlow =

English lawn bowler

Personal information
- Nationality: England

Sport
- Club: Exonia BC
Medal record
Representing England
World Outdoor Championships
Bronze medal – third place	1992 Ayr	Triples

Babs Barlow is a former international lawn bowler and bowls president from England.

She won a bronze medal in the Triples with Barbara Till, Norma Shaw and Edna Bessell at the 1992 World Outdoor Bowls Championship. Barlow was the English president and stepped in to replace the injured Norma Shaw.

Barlow was DCLBA President in 1987 and Bowls England in President 1992 and played club bowls for Exonia BC.
