= Daphne Shaw =

Australian former lawn bowls player

Personal information
- Nationality: Australian
- Born: 1943

Sport
- Club: North Haven
Medal record
Representing Australia
World Outdoor Championships
Gold medal – first place	1996 Leamington Spa	fours
Silver medal – second place	1996 Leamington Spa	triples
Commonwealth Games
Gold medal – first place	1990 Auckland	fours
Asia Pacific Bowls Championships
Bronze medal – third place	1991 Kowloon	singles
Gold medal – first place	1991 Kowloon	pairs

Daphne Ann Shaw is a former international lawn bowls competitor for Australia.

== Bowls career ==
Shaw started bowling in 1977 and won the 1979 North Haven Club Championship.

In 1990 she won a gold medal at the 1990 Commonwealth Games in Auckland. In 1991 Daphne won the NSW Champion of Club Champions singles title and won a gold medal in the pairs and a silver in the singles at the Asia Pacific Bowls Championships. In 1996 she won the gold medal in the fours and silver medal in the triples at the 1996 World Outdoor Bowls Championship in Adelaide.

She was inducted into Bowls NSW Hall of Fame in 2016 and in May 2021, she opened a new green at the New Haven Bowls Club, which is named after her.

== Personal life ==
Daphne married her husband Colin in 1963 and has been the mentor for Karen Murphy.
