= Roy Cutts =

British lawn bowler

Personal information
- Nationality: British (English)
- Born: 14 May 1953 Suffolk

Sport
- Club: Marlborough, Ipswich (outdoor); Ipswich (Indoor); Suffolk (county)
Medal record
Representing England
World Outdoor Championships
Silver medal – second place	1992 Worthing	team
British Isles Championships
Gold medal – first place	1984	triples

Roydon Cutts better known as Roy Cutts (born 1953) is an English international lawn and indoor bowler.

== Bowls career ==
Cutts made his international debut in 1979 and represented England during the 1990 Commonwealth Games in Auckland, New Zealand and represented England at the 1994 Commonwealth Games in Victoria, British Columbia, Canada.

He has won the 1983 national triples title bowling for Marlborough BC and Suffolk.
