= Kenny Logan (bowls) =

Scottish lawn bowler

Personal information
- Nationality: British (Scottish)

Sport
- Sport: Lawn and indoor bowls
- Club: Kirkliston BC
Medal record
Representing Scotland
World Outdoor Championships
Gold medal – first place	1996 Adelaide	triples
Gold medal – first place	1996 Adelaide	team

Kenny Logan is a former international lawn bowler from Scotland who won world championship gold and competed at the Commonwealth Games.

== Biography ==
Logan was born into a bowls family, his father Rennie Logan was also a Scottish international lawn bowler.

In 1995, he won the Hong Kong International Bowls Classic pairs title with Alex Marshall.

He won a gold medal in the triples at the 1996 World Outdoor Bowls Championship in Adelaide.

Logan represented the Scottish team at the 1998 Commonwealth Games in Kuala Lumpur, Malaysia, where he competed in the fours event, with Willie Wood, John Aitken and George Adrain.
