= Ashley van Winkel =

South African lawn bowler

Personal information
- Nationality: South Africa
Medal record
Representing South Africa
World Outdoor Championships
Bronze medal – third place	1996 Adelaide	triples

Ashley van Winkel is a former South African international lawn bowler.

He won a bronze medal in the triples at the 1996 World Outdoor Bowls Championship in Adelaide.
