= John Bell (bowls) =

British lawn bowler

Personal information
- Nationality: British (English)
- Born: 14 January 1947 (age 79)

Sport
- Sport: Lawn bowls
- Club: Wigton BC (outdoors); Cumbria BC (indoors)
Medal record
Representing England
World Outdoor Championships
Gold medal – first place	1980 Melbourne	Men's team
Gold medal – first place	1984 Aberdeen	Men's fours
Bronze medal – third place	1984 Aberdeen	Men's team
Gold medal – first place	1988 Auckland	Men's team
Bronze medal – third place	1988 Auckland	Men's triples
Bronze medal – third place	1988 Auckland	Men's fours
Silver medal – second place	1992 Worthing	Men's team
Gold medal – first place	1996 Adelaide	Men's fours
British Isles Championships
Gold medal – first place	1984	singles
Gold medal – first place	1992	pairs
Gold medal – first place	1992	triples

John Nicholson Bell (born 14 January 1947) is a former English lawn and indoor bowler, commentator and World Bowls President.

== Bowls career ==
=== World Championships ===
Bell won his first gold medal as part of the England team that won the team event (Leonard Cup) at the 1980 World Outdoor Bowls Championship in Melbourne. Four years later he won another gold at the 1984 World Outdoor Bowls Championships. Following a team gold and double bronze in the triples and fours at the 1988 Auckland Bell won a fourth gold medal in the fours with Andy Thomson, Brett Morley and David Cutler at the 1996 World Outdoor Bowls Championship.

=== Commonwealth Games ===
Bell represented England at the 1994 Commonwealth Games in the fours at the 1994 Commonwealth Games and the fours at the 1998 Commonwealth Games in Kuala Lumpur.

=== National ===
Bell made his first appearance in the National Championships at Mortlake in 1966 when he was just 18. He won National Championship titles in the singles in 1983, the triples in 1976 and pairs and triples in 1991. He also won the singles at the British Isles Bowls Championships in 1984. In 2016, he won the senior pairs title.

He bowled for the Wigton Club (outdoors) and the Cumbria Club in Carlisle (indoors). In the mid-1980s he joined the BBC bowls commentary team.

== Business career ==
Bell was the Head of Tourism for Carlisle City Council. He was appointed as the President of World Bowls on 6 December 2012, a position he held until 2021.
