= Cyril Lahana =

South African lawn bowler

Personal information
- Nationality: South Africa
Medal record
Representing South Africa
World Outdoor Championships
Silver medal – second place	1992 Worthing	triples
Bronze medal – third place	1992 Worthing	fours

Cyril Lahana is a former South African international lawn bowler.

He won the triples silver medal and fours bronze medal at the 1992 World Outdoor Bowls Championship in Worthing.
