= George Sneddon =

Scottish athlete

Personal information
- Nationality: Scottish
- Born: 13 December 1949 (age 76) Winchburgh

Sport
- Club: Broxburn
Medal record
Representing Scotland
World Outdoor Championships
Gold medal – first place	2000 Johannesburg	pairs
Bronze medal – third place	2000 Johannesburg	fours
Silver medal – second place	2000 Johannesburg	team
Gold medal – first place	2004 Ayr	team
Commonwealth Games
Gold medal – first place	2002 Manchester	pairs

George Sneddon (born 1949) in Winchburgh is a former Scottish international lawn and indoor bowls player.

== Bowls career ==
He won a gold medal in the pairs with Alex Marshall at the 2000 World Outdoor Bowls Championship in Johannesburg. He also won a bronze medal in the fours.

Sneddon won the gold medal in the pairs once again (with Marshall) but at the 2002 Commonwealth Games.

He was National singles champion in 1991 and triples champion in 1998.

In 2000, he won the Hong Kong International Bowls Classic singles title and the following year won the pairs title with Marshall.
