= Angus Blair =

Scottish bowler

Personal information
- Nationality: British (Scottish)
- Born: 13 May 1965

Sport
- Sport: Lawn and indoor bowls
- Club: Haddington BC (outdoor); Midlothian IBC (indoor)
Medal record
Representing Scotland
World Outdoor Championships
Gold medal – first place	1992 Worthing	fours
Gold medal – first place	1992 Worthing	team
Bronze medal – third place	1992 Worthing	triples
British Isles Championships
Gold medal – first place	1987	singles
Gold medal – first place	1989	pairs

Angus Ogilvie Blair (born 13 May 1965) is a former Scottish international lawn and indoor bowler.

== Biography ==
Blair made his international debut in 1984 and won a gold medal in the fours and a bronze medal in the singles at the 1992 World Outdoor Bowls Championship in Worthing.

He won the 1986 Scottish National Bowls Championships singles crown and subsequently won the singles at the British Isles Bowls Championships in 1987.

Blair represented the Scottish team at the 1990 Commonwealth Games in Auckland, New Zealand, where he competed in the pairs event, with Graham Robertson.

He also won the national pairs in 1988 and the fours in 2001.
