= Cecil Bransky =

South African bowler (born 1942)

Personal information
- Native name: ססיל ברנסקי
- Nationality: South African / Israeli
- Born: 15 May 1942 South Africa

Sport
- Club: Ra'anana Bowling Club
Medal record
Representing (Israel)
World Outdoor Championships
Gold medal – first place	1992 Worthing	triples
Bronze medal – third place	1992 Worthing	team

Cecil Bransky (Hebrew: ססיל ברנסקי; born 15 May 1942) is a former lawn and indoor international bowler.

== Bowls career ==
Cecil was born in South Africa and reached the 1971 South African National Bowls Championships singles final and one year later went one better by winning it, bowling for Balfour Park, South Transvaal.

Later he moved to Israel and won twelve national titles. He was the 1985 World Indoor Bowls Championship runner up. He won a Gold medal in the triples during the 1992 World Outdoor Bowls Championships. Because he moved to Israel he was able to compete in international competition despite the South African ban during his active years.

In 1993, he won the Hong Kong International Bowls Classic pairs title with Jeff Rabkin.
