= 2000 World Outdoor Bowls Championship =

World bowls event

World Outdoor Championships 2000
- 9th World Outdoor Bowls Championships
- Location: Johannesburg, South Africa (men's); Moama, Australia (Women's)
- Date: 1 April – 15 April 2000 (Men's); 8 March – 25 March 2000 (women's)
- Category: World Outdoor Championships

The 2000 Men's World Outdoor Bowls Championship was held at Marks Park Bowling Club, in Johannesburg, South Africa, from 1 to 15 April 2000.

The 2000 Women's World Outdoor Bowls Championship was held at Moama Bowling Club in Moama, Australia, from 8 to 25 March 2000.

== Medallists ==
Event	Gold	Silver	Bronze	Bronze
Men's singles	Jeremy Henry	(Australia); Steve Glasson	(Israel); Jeff Rabkin	(England); Tony Allcock
Men's pairs	(Scotland); Alex Marshall; George Sneddon	(South Africa); Shaun Addinall; Gerry Baker	(Australia); Brett Duprez; Mark Jacobsen	(New Zealand); Russell Meyer; Paul Girdler
Men's triples	(New Zealand); Andrew Curtain; Rowan Brassey; Peter Belliss	(Australia); Adam Jeffery; Steve Glasson; Rex Johnston	(Scotland); Robert Marshall; Jim McIntyre; Willie Wood	Martin McHugh; Ian McClure; Gary McCloy
Men's fours	(Wales); Mark Williams; Robert Weale; Stephen Rees; Will Thomas	(South Africa); Bruce Makkink; Bobby Donnelly; Shaun Addinall; Neil Burkett	(Scotland); Robert Marshall; George Sneddon; Jim McIntyre; Willie Wood	(New Zealand); Russell Meyer; Paul Girdler; Rowan Brassey; Peter Belliss
Men's team	Australia	Scotland	New Zealand	N/A
Women's singles	Margaret Johnston	(Wales); Rita Jones	(Australia); Karen Murphy	N/A
Women's pairs	(Scotland); Margaret Letham; Joyce Lindores	(Australia); Karen Murphy; Arrienne Wynen	(England); Jean Baker; Mary Price	N/A
Women's triples	(New Zealand); Sharon Sims; Anne Lomas; Patsy Jorgensen	(England); Katherine Hawes; Jill Polley; Norma Shaw	(Australia); Willow Fong; Margaret Sumner; Roma Dunn	N/A
Women's fours	(New Zealand); Jan Khan; Patsy Jorgensen; Sharon Sims; Anne Lomas	(Scotland); Julie Forrest; Betty Forsyth; Sarah Gourlay; Joyce Lindores	(Australia); Willow Fong; Margaret Sumner; Roma Dunn; Arrienne Wynen	N/A
Women's team	England	Australia	Scotland	N/A

== Results ==
=== W.M.Leonard Trophy (team) ===
The W.M Leonard Trophy was awarded to the best overall performance calculated from all four disciplines.

Pos	Team	Total	singles	pairs	triples	fours
1	Australia	88				
2	Scotland	86+				
3	New Zealand	86+				
4	South Africa	80				
5	Wales	77				
6	Ireland	77				
7	England	65				
8	Zimbabwe	62				
9	Hong Kong	61				
10	Israel	56				
11	Malaysia	55				
12	Canada	45				
13	Jersey	42				
14	Fiji	41				
15	United States	38				
16	(Eswatini) Swaziland	34				
17	Zambia	33				
18	Namibia	27				
19	Norfolk Island	25				
20	Guernsey	16				
21	Botswana	15				
22	Argentina	13				
23	Singapore	10				

+ Scotland won bronze on shots 370.20 to 248.40

=== Taylor Trophy (team) ===
The Taylor Trophy was awarded to the best overall performance calculated from points accumulated from the round-robin phase.

Pos	Team	Total	singles	pairs	triples	fours
1	England	111	28	27	30	26
2	Australia	110	28	30	26	26
3	Scotland	106	24	28	24	30
4	New Zealand	104	22	25	28	29
5	Wales	99	28	20	25	26
6	Jersey	98	26	18	26	28
7	South Africa	88	20	16	26	26
8	Ireland	86	26	17	24	19
9	Malaysia	85	18	20	20	27
10	(Eswatini) Swaziland	79	24	22	20	13
11	Israel	73	20	14	20	19
12	Papua New Guinea	72	20	26	8	18
13	Guernsey	71	20	21	16	14
14	Norfolk Island	71	20	21	17	13
15	Canada	71	20	14	20	17
16	Zimbabwe	66	16	14	18	18
17	Fiji	65	18	22	12	13
18	Zambia	63	16	16	9	22
19	Namibia	61	16	18	14	13
20	Hong Kong	60	12	16	14	18
21	Spain	58	12	16	18	12
22	United States	58	10	24	8	16
23	Cook Islands	57	10	18	12	17
24	Kenya	46	20	4	11	11
25	Botswana	44	10	8	16	10
26	India	40	16	2	21	1
27	Brunei	39	10	6	9	14
28	Samoa	37	2	12	13	10
29	Singapore	36	10	9	7	10
30	Thailand	31	6	14	5	6
31	Argentina	31	10	6	6	9
32	Netherlands	27	6	10	8	3
33	Brazil	24	0	6	10	8
34	Japan	9	0	4	3	2
