= Marius Hardiman =

British weightlifter

Personal information
- Nationality: British
- Weight: 83 kg (183 lb)

Sport
- Sport: Weightlifting
- Events: 83 kg, 85 kg, 82.5 kg
- Club: Morris Motors Weightlifting Club, Oxford Powersports
- Team: Wales, Great Britain
- Retired: 1999

Achievements and titles
- Personal bests: Snatch: 157.5 kg (1995); Clean & Jerk: 190 kg (1995); Total: 347.5 kg (1995)

Marius Hardiman is a former British weightlifter who competed in the 82.5 kg, 83 kg, 85 kg and 77 kg categories. He now coaches weightlifting at Oxford Powersports.

He competed for the Welsh team at the 1998 Commonwealth Games in Kuala Lumpur, Malaysia.
