= David Cutler (bowls) =

British lawn bowler

Personal information
- Nationality: British (English)
- Born: 1 August 1954 (age 71)

Sport
- Club: St Austell BC
Medal record
Representing England
World Outdoor Championships
Gold medal – first place	1996 Adelaide	Men's fours
British Isles Championships
Gold medal – first place	1973	triples

David Cutler (born 1 August 1954) is a former English international lawn and indoor bowler.

== Bowls career ==
Cutler won his first national triples title in 1972 aged 18 and at the time he was the youngest ever national champion. He represented St Austell BC and was both an England international indoors and outdoors representative. He won the 1974 national junior singles, and won the prestigious national singles in 1979.

He was part of the fours team with John Bell, Andy Thomson and Brett Morley that won the gold medal at the 1996 World Outdoor Bowls Championship in Adelaide. He also represented England, at the 1998 Commonwealth Games in Kuala Lumpur, Malaysia.

== Personal life ==
He was an Inland revenue officer by trade.
