= David File =

New Zealand lawn and indoor bowls player

Personal information
- Nationality: New Zealander
- Born: 1966 (age 59–60) Gisborne, New Zealand
Medal record
Representing New Zealand
World Outdoor Championships
| Silver medal – second place | 1996 Adelaide | triples |
| Bronze medal – third place | 1996 Adelaide | fours |
Asia Pacific Bowls Championships
| Gold medal – first place | 1995 Dunedin | triples |
| Gold medal – first place | 1995 Dunedin | fourss |

David File (born 1967) is a former New Zealand international lawn bowler.

== Bowls career ==
He won two medals at the 1996 World Outdoor Bowls Championship; a silver in the triples and a bronze in the fours.

He won double gold at the 1995 Asia Pacific Bowls Championships, in Dunedin, New Zealand.

He was given a ten-year ban by Bowls Gisborne East Coast in 2010 for lewd behaviour, which was later revoked by Bowls New Zealand.
