= Mavis Le Marquand =

Personal information
- Nationality: Jersey
Medal record
Representing Jersey
World Outdoor Championships
Silver medal – second place	1992 Ayr	pairs

Mavis Le Marquand is a former international lawn bowler from Jersey.

She won a silver medal in the pairs at the 1992 World Outdoor Bowls Championship in Ayr with Sheila Syvret.

She also competed at the 1994 Commonwealth Games.
