= Margaret Hughes (bowler) =

Personal information
- Nationality: Zambia
Medal record
Representing Zambia
World Outdoor Championships
Bronze medal – third place	1992 Ayr	pairs

Margaret Hughes is a former international lawn bowler from Zambia.

Margaret Hughes became a resident of Zambia in 1964 and began bowling in 1971, she made her debut for Zambia at the 1985 World Outdoor Bowls Championship.

She won a bronze medal in the pairs at the 1992 World Outdoor Bowls Championship in Ayr with Helen Graham. She also competed in the 1994 Commonwealth Games.
