= Jill Polley =

British lawn bowler

Personal information
- Nationality: British (English)

Sport
- Sport: Lawn / indoor bowls
- Club: Great Baddow BC
Medal record
Women's lawn bowls
Representing England
World Outdoor Championships
Silver medal – second place	2000 Moama	Women's Triples
Gold medal – first place	2000 Moama	Women's Team
British Isles Championships
Gold medal – first place	1994	triples

Jill Polley is an English international lawn and indoor bowler.

== Bowls career ==
She won a triples silver medal at the 2000 World Outdoor Bowls Championship in Moama, Australia.

Polley was the 1993 National triples champion at the National Championships.

Polley is the Secretary of the Essex County Bowling Association.
