= Arrienne Wynen =

Australian international lawn bowler

Personal information
- Nationality: Australian
- Born: 9 April 1955 (age 71)

Sport
- Sport: Lawn bowls
Medal record
Women's lawn bowls
Representing Australia
World Outdoor Championships
Silver medal – second place	2000 Moama	pairs
Bronze medal – third place	2000 Moama	fours
Silver medal – second place	2000 Moama	team
Asia Pacific Bowls Championships
Gold medal – first place	2001 Melbourne	triples
Gold medal – first place	2001 Melbourne	fours

Arrienne Wynen is an Australian international female lawn bowler.

== Bowls career ==
Wynen represented Australia in the fours at the 2002 Commonwealth Games.

Wynen won a pairs silver medal with Karen Murphy and fours bronze medal at the 2000 World Outdoor Bowls Championship in Moama, Australia.

She won double gold at the 2001 Asia Pacific Bowls Championships in Melbourne.
