= 2000 World Outdoor Bowls Championship – Men's pairs =

World bowls event

World Outdoor Championships 2000 men's pairs
- 9th World Outdoor Bowls Championships
- Location: , Johannesburg, South Africa
- Date(s): 1 April - 15 April 2000
- Category: World Bowls Championship

The 2000 Men's World Outdoor Bowls Championship men's pairs was held at Marks Park Bowling Club, in Johannesburg, South Africa, from 1 to 15 April 2000.

Alex Marshall & George Sneddon of Scotland won the gold medal.

== Qualifying round ==
=== Section A ===
Pos	Player	P	W	D	L	Pts	Shots
1	(New Zealand) Russell Meyer & Paul Girdler	10	8	0	2	18	+33
2	(Australia) Brett Duprez & Mark Jacobsen	10	7	1	2	17	+52
3	(Hong Kong) Anthony Carstairs & Noel Kennedy	10	7	0	3	16	+66
4	Malaysia	10	6	0	4	14	+14
5	Jeremy Henry & Neil Booth	10	5	1	4	13	+32
6	(Jersey) Allan Quemard & Thomas Greechan	10	5	1	4	13	+10
7	(Fiji) Caucau Turagabeci & Shorab Khan	10	5	0	5	12	+12
8	(Zambia) Eddie Nkole & Stan Maynard	10	4	1	5	11	-19
9	(Guernsey) Gary Pitschou & Paul Ingrouille	10	3	2	5	10	-11
10	Argentina	10	1	0	9	4	-69
11	Botswana	10	1	0	9	4	-120

=== Section B ===
Pos	Player	P	W	D	L	Pts	Shots
1	(Scotland) Alex Marshall & George Sneddon	11	11	0	0	22	+115
2	(South Africa) Shaun Addinall & Gerry Baker	11	6	2	3	14	+74
3	(Wales) John Price & Robert Weale	11	6	2	3	14	+56
4	(United States) Ian Ho, Barry Pickup & David Kempthorne +	11	7	0	4	14	+26
5	Zimbabwe	11	6	1	4	13	+25
6	(Canada) Dave Anderson & Mark Sandford	11	6	0	5	12	+42
7	(England) John Ottaway & Andy Thomson	11	6	0	5	12	+29
8	(Eswatini) Swaziland	11	5	0	6	10	-22?
9	(Israel) Jeff Rabkin & Yair Lieberthal	11	4	1	6	9	+24?
10	Norfolk Island	11	2	0	9	4	-104?
11	Namibia	11	2	0	9	4	-105
12	Singapore	11	2	0	9	4	-158?

+ Replacement

== Finals ==
Semifinals
Scotland	19
Australia	17
South Africa	22
New Zealand	17

Gold medal
Scotland	24
South Africa	14

== Results ==
men's pairs Section A
Round 1 - 1 Apr		
Ireland	Hong Kong	27-13
Guernsey	Botswana	33-16
New Zealand	Argentina	19-18
Zambia	Fiji	30-11
Australia	Jersey	23-18
Round 2 - 1 Apr		
Ireland	Argentina	24-19
New Zealand	Jersey	18-15
Australia	Hong Kong	24-23
Fiji	Botswana	33-15
Malaysia	Zambia	27-14
Round 3 - 2 Apr		
Ireland	Malaysia	23-17
Hong Kong	Fiji	31-16
Australia	Zambia	22-22
Jersey	Botswana	29-13
Guernsey	Argentina	22-17
Round 4 - 3 Apr		
Ireland	Zambia	25-8
New Zealand	Botswana	31-9
Hong Kong	Malaysia	22-11
Australia	Fiji	22-18
Jersey	Guernsey	22-22
Round 5 - 3 Apr		
Australia	Botswana	30-10
New Zealand	Guernsey	18-16
Fiji	Jersey	33-15
Hong Kong	Zambia	25-15
Malaysia	Argentina	23-19
Round 6 - 4 Apr		
Ireland	Fiji	16-13
New Zealand	Malaysia	21-20
Australia	Guernsey	27-16
Jersey	Zambia	24-18
Argentina	Botswana	24-19
Round 7 - 4 Apr		
Ireland	Guernsey	21-21
New Zealand	Fiji	21-13
Hong Kong	Botswana	26-16
Malaysia	Australia	19-15
Zambia	Argentina	21-18
Round 8 - 5 Apr		
Jersey	Ireland	21–18
Hong Kong	Argentina	28–7
Malaysia	Botswana	28–17
New Zealand	Australia	25–15
Fiji	Guernsey	26–15
Round 9 - 6 Apr		
Australia	Ireland	23–15
Jersey	Argentina	24–13
Guernsey	Zambia	23–16
Hong Kong	New Zealand	23–15
Fiji	Malaysia	29–18
Round 10 - 6 Apr		
New Zealand	Ireland	16–14
Australia	Argentina	29–12
Hong Kong	Jersey	16–19
Zambia	Botswana	19–15
Malaysia	Guernsey	23–16
Round 11 - 7 Apr		
Botswana	Ireland	25–22
Zambia	New Zealand	25–17
Hong Kong	Guernsey	22–13
Malaysia	Jersey	21–17
Fiji	Argentina	22–19

men's pairs Section B
Round 1 - 1 Apr		
Canada	Zimbabwe	19-18
United States	South Africa	23-18
(Eswatini) Swaziland	England	17-14
Scotland	Singapore	24-9
Israel	Namibia	32-9
Norfolk Island	Wales	23-13
Round 2 - 1 Apr		
Scotland	Zimbabwe	27-14
United States	Singapore	24-11
England	Wales	23-19
South Africa	Canada	14-12
Norfolk Island	Namibia	26-20
(Eswatini) Swaziland	Israel	24-11
Round 3 - 2 Apr		
United States	Zimbabwe	32-23
South Africa	Singapore	32-8
Wales	Israel	17-17
Scotland	Canada	21-15
England	Norfolk Island	27-13
Namibia	(Eswatini) Swaziland	17-14
Round 4 - 3 Apr		
Zimbabwe	Singapore	19-14
Scotland	South Africa	20-19
England	Israel	23-14
Canada	United States	28-8
(Eswatini) Swaziland	Norfolk Island	19-16
Wales	Namibia	23-15
Round 5 - 4 Apr		
Zimbabwe	South Africa	16-16
Scotland	United States	23-14
England	Namibia	21-17
Canada	Singapore	21-11
Israel	Norfolk Island	27-8
Wales	(Eswatini) Swaziland	26-17
Round 6 - 4 Apr		
Zimbabwe	Norfolk Island	25-21
Scotland	Wales	20-12
Singapore	Namibia	19-10
Canada	England	21-12
(Eswatini) Swaziland	United States	20-16
South Africa	Israel	28-13
Round 7 - 4 Apr		
Zimbabwe	England	20-18
Scotland	Norfolk Island	20-16
Israel	Singapore	41-10
Wales	Canada	23-13
United States	Namibia	28-24
South Africa	(Eswatini) Swaziland	23-17
Round 8 - 5 Apr		
Scotland	Namibia	35–9
Wales	Zimbabwe	23–11
England	South Africa	22–20
United States	Israel	21–19?
Canada	(Eswatini) Swaziland	25–13?
Singapore	Norfolk Island	22–10?
Round 9 - 5 Apr		
Scotland	Israel	26–22
Wales	Singapore	34–8
South Africa	Namibia	36–28
United States	England	26–15
Canada	Norfolk Island	32–13
Zimbabwe	(Eswatini) Swaziland	26–14
Round 10 - 6 Apr		
Zimbabwe	Namibia	36–9
Scotland	England	17–10
(Eswatini) Swaziland	Singapore	26–7
Israel	Canada	21–17
United States	Norfolk Island	37–9
Wales	South Africa	17–17
Round 11 - 7 Apr		
Zimbabwe	Israel	24–14
Scotland	(Eswatini) Swaziland	29–7
England	Singapore	36–10
Namibia	Canada	22–15
Wales	United States	27–14
South Africa	Norfolk Island	42–12
