= Barbara Till =

British lawn bowler

Personal information
- Nationality: British (English)

Sport
- Club: Milton Park
Medal record
Representing England
World Outdoor Championships
Bronze medal – third place	1992 Ayr	Triples
Bronze medal – third place	1992 Ayr	Fours
British Isles Championships
Gold medal – first place	1991	singles

Barbara Till is a former international lawn bowler from England.

== Bowls career ==
Till won a bronze medal in the Triples with Edna Bessell, Norma Shaw and Babs Barlow at the 1992 World Outdoor Bowls Championship. Barlow was the English president and had stepped in to replace the injured Norma Shaw. She also won a second bronze in the fours with Jean Baker, Bessell and Mary Price.

Till also won a national singles title in 1990 representing Hampshire and subsequently won the singles at the British Isles Bowls Championships in 1991.
