= Brett Morley =

Lawn bowler

Personal information
- Nationality: British (English)
- Born: 28 May 1960

Sport
- Club: Plessey Bowling Club (outdoor); Nottingham (indoor)
Medal record
Representing (England)
World Outdoor Championships
| Gold medal – first place | 1996 Adelaide | fours |
British Isles Championships
| Gold medal – first place | 1995 | singles |
| Gold medal – first place | 2002 | triples |

Brett Morley (born 1960) is an England international lawn and indoor bowler.

== Bowls career ==
He followed his father Stanley Morley in gaining international honours and won a gold medal in the fours with Andy Thomson, David Cutler and John Bell at the 1996 World Outdoor Bowls Championship in Worthing.

He also represented England at the 1998 Commonwealth Games in the fours event, at the 1998 Commonwealth Games in Kuala Lumpur, Malaysia.

Morley was the National champion in 1994 and subsequently won the singles at the British Isles Bowls Championships in 1995. He had previously won the national junior singles in 1984.

In 2001, he won the national triples.
