= Sheila Syvret =

Personal information
- Nationality: Jersey
- Born: September 9, 1943 (age 82)
Medal record
Representing Jersey
World Outdoor Championships
| Silver medal – second place | 1992 Ayr | pairs |
| Silver medal – second place | 1996 Leamington Spa | pairs |

Sheila Syvret is a former international lawn bowler from Jersey.

She won a silver medal in the pairs at the 1992 World Outdoor Bowls Championship in Ayr with Mavis Le Marquand and four years later repeated the success by claiming another pairs silver at the 1996 World Outdoor Bowls Championship in Leamington Spa, with Jean Jones.

She also competed in three Commonwealth Games in 1990, 1994 and 2002.
