= John Aitken (bowls) =

Scottish international lawn bowler

Personal information
- Nationality: British (Scottish)
- Born: 19 September 1954 (age 71)

Sport
- Sport: Lawn and indoor bowls
- Club: Kirkliston BC
Medal record
Representing Scotland
Scottish Nationals
Gold medal – first place	1988	singles

John Aitken (born 19 September 1954) is a former international lawn bowler from Scotland who competed at the Commonwealth Games.

== Biography ==
Aitken was a member of the Kirkliston Bowls Club.

A structural engineer by profession, he represented Scotland at international level from 1991 to 1999 and again in 2009.

Aitken represented the Scottish team at the 1998 Commonwealth Games in Kuala Lumpur, Malaysia, where he competed in the fours event, with Willie Wood, Kenny Logan and George Adrain.

He was the singles champion of Scotland at the 1988 Scottish National Bowls Championships and subsequently qualified to represent Scotland at the British Isles Bowls Championships.
