= Gordana Baric =

Australian lawn bowls player

Personal information
- Nationality: Australia
- Born: 10 June 1944 (age 82)

Sport
- Club: Mulgrave CC/Ringwood BC
Medal record
Representing Australia
World Outdoor Championships
Gold medal – first place	1996 Leamington Spa	fours
Silver medal – second place	1996 Leamington Spa	triples
Commonwealth Games
Bronze medal – third place	1998 Kuala Lumpur	pairs

Gordana Baric (born 1944) is a former international lawn bowls competitor for Australia.

In 1996 she won the gold medal in the fours and silver medal in the triples at the 1996 World Outdoor Bowls Championship in Adelaide. Two years later she won a bronze medal at the 1998 Commonwealth Games in the pairs with Willow Fong.
