= Lawrence Mendelsohn =

Israeli lawn bowler

Personal information
- Native name: לורנס מנדלסון
- Nationality: Israel
Medal record
Representing (Israel)
World Outdoor Championships
Gold medal – first place	1992 Worthing	triples
Bronze medal – third place	1992 Worthing	team

Lawrence Mendelsohn (Hebrew: לורנס מנדלסון) is a former Israel international lawn bowler.

He won a gold medal in the triples during the 1992 World Outdoor Bowls Championship in Worthing.
