= Barbara Redshaw =

South African lawn and indoor bowler

Personal information
- Nationality: South African

Sport
- Club: South Transvaal; Italian Club Johannesburg
Medal record
Representing South Africa
World Outdoor Championships
Gold medal – first place	1996 Leamington Spa	triples
Silver medal – second place	1996 Leamington Spa	fours
Gold medal – first place	1996 Leamington Spa	team
Atlantic Bowls Championships
Bronze medal – third place	1993 Florida	singles
Gold medal – first place	1997 Llandrindod Wells	fours

Barbara Redshaw is a former international lawn and indoor bowls competitor for South Africa.

== Bowls career ==
In 1993 she won the singles bronze medal at the inaugural Atlantic Bowls Championships.

In 1996 she won the gold medal in the triples at the 1996 World Outdoor Bowls Championship in Adelaide.

In 1997 she won the fours gold medal at the Atlantic Bowls Championships with Jannie de Beer, Lorna Trigwell and Hester Bekker.
