= Jean Jones (lawn bowler) =

Personal information
- Nationality: British (Jersey)
- Born: October 17, 1932 (age 93)
Medal record
Representing Jersey
World Outdoor Championships
Silver medal – second place	1996 Leamington Spa	pairs
Atlantic Bowls Championships
Bronze medal – third place	1995 Durban	triples

Jean Jones (born 1932), is a former international lawn bowler from Jersey.

== Bowls career ==
In 1995, she won the triples bronze gold medal at the Atlantic Bowls Championships with Denise Falkner and Val Stead.

The following year she won a silver medal in the pairs at the 1996 World Outdoor Bowls Championship in Leamington Spa with Sheila Syvret.

She also competed in the Commonwealth Games during 1998.
