= Val Stead =

British lawn bowler

Personal information
- Nationality: British (Jersey)
Medal record
Representing Jersey
Atlantic Bowls Championships
Bronze medal – third place	1995 Durban	triples

Valerie Stead is a former international lawn bowler from Jersey.

== Bowls career ==
In 1995, she won the triples bronze medal at the Atlantic Bowls Championships with Denise Falkner and Jean Jones.

She has represented Jersey at the Commonwealth Games, in the singles at the 1994 Commonwealth Games.
