= Mark Williams (bowls) =

Personal information
- Nationality: British (Welsh)
Medal record
Representing Wales
World Outdoor Championship
Gold medal – first place	2000 Johannesburg	fours

Mark Williams is a Welsh international lawn and indoor bowler.

Williams won a fours gold medal at the 2000 World Outdoor Bowls Championship in Johannesburg with Stephen Rees, Will Thomas and Robert Weale.
