= Tony Morgan (weightlifter) =

British weightlifter

Personal information
- Nationality: British
- Born: 13 June 1969 (age 57) Cambridge, England

Sport
- Sport: Weightlifting
Medal record
Representing Wales
Commonwealth Games
Bronze medal – third place	1998 Kuala Lumpur	69 kg snatch

Tony Morgan (born 13 June 1969) is a British weightlifter. He competed in the men's middleweight event at the 1992 Summer Olympics.

== Personal life ==
He lives in Royston, Hertfordshire, with his wife and two children.
