= Marge Shepardson =

American politician

Member of New Hampshire House of Representatives for Cheshire 10
- In office 2012–2018

Personal details
- Party: Democratic

Marjorie J. "Marge" Shepardson is an American politician. She was a member of the New Hampshire House of Representatives. Shephardson represented Cheshire's 10th district.
