= Judith Wason =

Welsh bowls player

Personal information
- Nationality: British (Welsh)
- Born: 1962 (age 63–64)

Sport
- Club: Cardiff BC
Medal record
Representing Wales
World Outdoor Championships
| Bronze medal – third place | 1996 Leamington Spa | triples |
Atlantic Bowls Championships
| Silver medal – second place | 1995 Durban | triples |
British Isles Championships
| Gold medal – first place | 2016 | singles |

Judith Wason is a Welsh international lawn bowler .

== Bowls career ==
She was first capped by Wales in 1991 and in 1995 she won the triples silver medal at the Atlantic Bowls Championships.

She won a bronze medal in the triples at the 1996 World Outdoor Bowls Championship in Leamington Spa with Ann Sutherland and Betty Morgan. She also competed in the Commonwealth Games during 1998.

In 2012, she won the Hong Kong International Bowls Classic pairs title with Kelly Packwood.

After her 2015 Welsh National Bowls Championships singles success she subsequently won the singles at the British Isles Bowls Championships in 2016. She had previously won the Welsh National singles title in 1994.

== Personal life ==
She is married to Welsh bowler Andrew Wason.
