= Margaret Sumner =

Australian lawn bowls player (1941–2022)

Personal information
- Nationality: Australian
- Born: 7 July 1941 Terang, Australia
- Died: 16 October 2022 (aged 81) Warrnambool, Australia
Medal record
Representing Australia
World Outdoor Championships
Gold medal – first place	1996 Leamington Spa	fours
Silver medal – second place	1996 Leamington Spa	triples
Bronze medal – third place	2000 Moama	triples
Bronze medal – third place	2000 Moama	fours
Silver medal – second place	2000 Moama	team
Commonwealth Games
Silver medal – second place	1998 Kuala Lumpur	fours
Asia Pacific Bowls Championships
Silver medal – second place	1995 Dunedin	triples
Silver medal – second place	1995 Dunedin	fours
Gold medal – first place	1997 Warilla	triples
Gold medal – first place	1997 Warilla	fours

Margaret Sumner (née Terrington; 7 July 1941 – 16 October 2022) was an international lawn bowls competitor for Australia.

== Biography ==
Sumner was born on 7 July 1941. In 1996, she won the gold medal in the fours and silver medal in the triples at the 1996 World Outdoor Bowls Championship in Adelaide. Two years later she won a bronze medal at the 1998 Commonwealth Games in the pairs.

Sumner won four medals at the Asia Pacific Bowls Championships including double gold medal in the 1997 triples and fours at Warilla, Australia.

Sumner won the Terang Bowling Club Championship 18 times and married Allan Sumner in 1966.

Sumner died in Warrnambool on 16 October 2022, at the age of 81.
