= Jason Davies =

Personal information
- Nationality: Wales

Sport
- Club: Port Talbot BC
Medal record
Representing Wales
World Outdoor Championship
Silver medal – second place	1996 Adelaide	fours

Jason Davies is a Welsh international lawn and indoor bowler.

He won a silver medal in the fours at the 1996 World Outdoor Bowls Championship in Adelaide.
