= Jason Vaughan-Davies =

Zimbabwean cricketer (born 1974)

Personal information
- Full name: William Jason Vaughan-Davies
- Born: 29 June 1974 (age 52); Salisbury, Rhodesia
- Batting: Right-handed
- Bowling: Right-arm medium

Domestic team information
- Years: Team
- 2000/01: Mashonaland A

Career statistics
Competition	FC
Matches	1
Runs scored	14
Batting average	14.00
100s/50s	0/0
Top score	14
Catches/stumpings	1/–
- Source: ESPNcricinfo, 15 July 2021

William Jason Vaughan-Davies (born 29 June 1974) is a former Zimbabwean cricketer. Born in Salisbury (now Harare), he played one first-class match for Mashonaland A during the 2000–01 Logan Cup.
