= Jannie de Beer (bowls) =

Personal information
- Nationality: South African

Sport
- Club: Centurion Bowling Club
Medal record
Representing South Africa
World Outdoor Championships
Gold medal – first place	1996 Leamington Spa	triples
Silver medal – second place	1996 Leamington Spa	fours
Gold medal – first place	1996 Leamington Spa	team
Atlantic Bowls Championships
Gold medal – first place	1997 Llandrindod Wells	fours

Jannie de Beer is a former international lawn and indoor bowls competitor for South Africa.

== Bowls career ==
In 1996 she won the gold medal in the triples and a silver medal in the fours at the 1996 World Outdoor Bowls Championship in Adelaide.

The following year she won the fours gold medal at the Atlantic Bowls Championships in Llandrindod Wells with Barbara Redshaw, Lorna Trigwell and Hester Bekker.

She plays for the Centurion Bowling Club in Gauteng North.
