= Adam Jeffery =

Australian lawn bowler

Personal information
- Nationality: Australian
- Born: 30 December 1971 (age 54) Tumut
Medal record
Representing Australia
World Outdoor Championships
Silver medal – second place	2000 Johannesburg	triples
Gold medal – first place	2000 Johannesburg	team
Commonwealth Games
Silver medal – second place	1998 Kuala Lumpur	fours
Asia Pacific Bowls Championships
Gold medal – first place	1999 Kuala Lumpur	triples
Gold medal – first place	1999 Kuala Lumpur	fours
Gold medal – first place	2001 Melbourne	triples
Gold medal – first place	2001 Melbourne	fours

Adam Jeffery (born 1971) is an Australian international lawn bowler.

== Bowls career ==
Jeffery won a silver medal in the triples at the 2000 World Outdoor Bowls Championship in Johannesburg.

In addition he has won a medal at the Commonwealth Games winning a silver medal at the 1998 Commonwealth Games in Kuala Lumpur and in 2015 he was inducted into the Australian Hall of Fame.

He has a 100% success rate at the Asia Pacific Bowls Championships, winning four golds from four events. and won three consecutive Hong Kong International Bowls Classic singles titles, in 1997, 1998 and 1999.
