= Robert Marshall (bowls) =

Personal information
- Nationality: Scotland
- Born: 1964 (age 61–62)

Sport
- Club: Slateford (Edinburgh)
Medal record
Representing Scotland
World Outdoor Championships
Bronze medal – third place	2000 Johannesburg	triples
Bronze medal – third place	2000 Johannesburg	fours
Silver medal – second place	2000 Johannesburg	team

Robert Marshall (born 1964) is a Scottish international lawn and indoor bowler.

He won double bronze in the triples and fours at the 2000 World Outdoor Bowls Championship in Johannesburg and is the older brother of Alex Marshall.
