= Jeff Rabkin =

Former Israel international bowls player

Personal information
- Native name: ג'ף רבקין
- Nationality: Israeli
- Born: 1958 (age 67–68) South Africa

Sport
- Sport: Lawn and indoor bowls
Medal record
Representing Israel
World Outdoor Championships
Bronze medal – third place	1992 Worthing	singles
Bronze medal – third place	1992 Worthing	team
Silver medal – second place	1996 Adelaide	singles
Bronze medal – third place	2000 Johannesburg	singles

Jeff Rabkin (Hebrew: ג'ף רבקין; born 1958 in South Africa) is a former Israeli international bowls player.

== Bowls career ==
Born in South Africa, he started playing at age 18. After emigrating to Israel in 1985, he won the Israeli national title seven times and the masters sixteen times. In February 2000, he reached a career-high ranking of world number one. He was an Israeli multi champion.

He won three medals in the singles event at consecutive World Bowls Championships; a bronze in 1992 World Outdoor Bowls Championship in Worthing, a silver at the 1996 World Outdoor Bowls Championship in Adelaide, and another bronze at the 2000 World Outdoor Bowls Championship in Johannesburg.

In 1993, he won the Hong Kong International Bowls Classic pairs title alongside Cecil Bransky.

Rabkin finished runner-up behind Darren Burnett of Scotland at the 2006 World Singles Champion of Champions in Christchurch, New Zealand.
