= Linda Smith (bowls) =

Personal information
- Nationality: Hongkonger

Sport
- Sport: Lawn bowls
Medal record
Representing (Hong Kong) Hong Kong
Asia Pacific Bowls Championships
Gold medal – first place	1991 Kowloon	triples

Linda Smith is a former Hong Kong international lawn bowler.

== Bowls career ==
Smith has represented Hong Kong at the Commonwealth Games, in the pairs event at the 1994 Commonwealth Games.

She won a triples gold medal at the 1991 Asia Pacific Bowls Championships in Kowloon.
