= Jim McIntyre (bowls) =

Personal information
- Nationality: British (Scottish)

Sport
- Club: Houldsworth Bowling Club
Medal record
Representing Scotland
World Outdoor Championships
Bronze medal – third place	2000 Johannesburg	triples
Bronze medal – third place	2000 Johannesburg	fours
Silver medal – second place	2000 Johannesburg	team
Gold medal – first place	2004 Ayr	triples
Gold medal – first place	2004 Ayr	team

James McIntyre is a Scottish international lawn and indoor bowler.

== Career ==
McIntyre made his Scottish debut in 1994.

He won double bronze in the triples and fours at the 2000 World Outdoor Bowls Championship in Johannesburg before winning a gold medal in the triples at the 2004 World Outdoor Bowls Championship in Ayr with Willie Wood and David Peacock.
