= Rex Johnston (bowls) =

Australian lawn bowler

Personal information
- Nickname: Paddles
- Nationality: Australian
- Born: 7 October 1950 (age 75) Coffs Harbour
Medal record
Representing Australia
World Outdoor Championships
Bronze medal – third place	1996 Adelaide	pairs
Bronze medal – third place	1996 Adelaide	fours
Silver medal – second place	2000 Johannesburg	triples
Gold medal – first place	2000 Johannesburg	team
Commonwealth Games
Gold medal – first place	1994 Victoria	pairs
Silver medal – second place	1998 Kuala Lumpur	fours
Asia Pacific Bowls Championships
Gold medal – first place	1989 Suva	triples
Gold medal – first place	1989 Suva	fours
Silver medal – second place	1995 Dunedin	pairs
Bronze medal – third place	1995 Dunedin	fours
Silver medal – second place	1997 Warilla	fours
Gold medal – first place	1999 Kuala Lumpur	triples
Gold medal – first place	1999 Kuala Lumpur	fours
Gold medal – first place	2001 Melbourne	triples
Gold medal – first place	2001 Melbourne	fours

Rex Johnston (born 1950) is an Australian international lawn bowler.

== Bowls career ==
=== World Championships ===
Johnston won two bronze medals in the pairs and fours at the 1996 World Outdoor Bowls Championship in Adelaide. He won a silver medal in the triples at the 2000 World Outdoor Bowls Championship in Johannesburg.

=== Commonwealth Games ===
In addition he has appeared at four Commonwealth Games, winning a gold medal at the 1994 Commonwealth Games, and a silver at the 1998 Commonwealth Games and won he pairs title at the Australian National Bowls Championships in 1987.

=== Other ===
He won nine medals at the Asia Pacific Bowls Championships including six gold medals. In 1989, he won the Hong Kong International Bowls Classic pairs title.

=== Coaching and awards ===
He coached Malta at the 2006 Commonwealth Games, and from 2009-11 he was the Australian National Coach.

In October 2017 he was entered into the Bowls Australia Sporting Hall of Fame as one of only three "legends" of the sport.
