= Peter Belliss =

New Zealand lawn bowler (born 1951)

Peter Belliss MBE
Personal information
- Born: Peter James Belliss; 12 November 1951 (age 74) Wanganui, New Zealand
- Relative: Moke Belliss (grandfather)

Sport
- Country: New Zealand
- Sport: Lawn bowls
- Club: Aramoho Bowling Club
Medal record
Men's lawn bowls
Representing New Zealand
World Outdoor Bowls Championships
Gold medal – first place	1984 Aberdeen	Men's singles
Silver medal – second place	1984 Aberdeen	Men's team
Gold medal – first place	1988 Auckland	Men's pairs
Silver medal – second place	1988 Auckland	Men's team
Silver medal – second place	1996 Adelaide	Men's triples
Bronze medal – third place	1996 Adelaide	Men's fours
Gold medal – first place	2000 Johannesburg	Men's triples
Bronze medal – third place	2000 Johannesburg	Men's fours
Bronze medal – third place	2000 Johannesburg	Men's team
Commonwealth Games
Bronze medal – third place	1994 Victoria	men's fours
Bronze medal – third place	1982 Brisbane	men's singles
Asia Pacific Bowls Championships
Bronze medal – third place	1991 Kowloon	singles
Bronze medal – third place	1991 Kowloon	pairs
Gold medal – first place	1995 Dunedin	triples
Gold medal – first place	1995 Dundein	fours
Gold medal – first place	1997 Warilla	triples
Gold medal – first place	1997 Warilla	fours

Peter James Belliss MBE (born 12 November 1951) is a former lawn bowls player for New Zealand.

== Background ==
Belliss was born in Wanganui in 1951, attending (and playing rugby football at) Wanganui Boys' College. He started playing in the 1970s in the Aramaho (Wanganui) club; Joseph Romanos called him The young Turk of lawn bowls. He had been a railways fitter, and in 1982 was the first New Zealand lawn bowler to turn professional.

== Bowls career ==
At the World Bowls Championships, Belliss won the 1984 singles in Aberdeen against local player Willie Wood, the 1988 pairs with Rowan Brassey, and men's triples with Brassey and Andrew Curtain at the 2000 World Outdoor Bowls Championship in Johannesburg.

He has competed at four Commonwealth Games: 1982 (winning bronze), 1994 (winning bronze), 1998, and 2002; missing 1986 as a professional and 1990 as he had played in South Africa five years previously.

He won six medals at the Asia Pacific Bowls Championships including four gold medals and in 1983 and 1989, he won the Hong Kong International Bowls Classic singles title.

He won the 1981, 1986 and 1992 singles titles, the 1992 and 1995 pairs titles, and the 2009, 2014/15 and 2016/17 fours titles at the New Zealand National Bowls Championships when bowling for the Aramoho Bowling Club.

== Coaching ==
He was a coach at the 2006 Commonwealth Games.

== Honours ==
In the 1988 Queen's Birthday Honours, Belliss was appointed a Member of the Order of the British Empire, for services to bowls. In 2013, Belliss was an inaugural inductee into the Bowls New Zealand Hall of Fame.
