= Will Thomas (bowls) =

Welsh lawn and indoor bowler (born 1954)

Personal information
- Nationality: British (Welsh)
- Born: 21 October 1954

Sport
- Sport: Lawn and indoor bowls
- Club: Pontrhydyfen BC
Medal record
Representing Wales
World Outdoor Championship
| Bronze medal – third place | 1988 Auckland | pairs |
| Silver medal – second place | 1996 Adelaide | fours |
| Bronze medal – third place | 1996 Adelaide | pairs |
| Gold medal – first place | 2000 Johannesburg | fours |
Representing Wales
Commonwealth Games
| Gold medal – first place | 1986 Edinburgh | fours |
| Silver medal – second place | 1998 Kuala Lumpur | pairs |
British Isles Championships
| Gold medal – first place | 1991 | singles |

William "Will" Thomas (born 21 October 1954) is a former international lawn and indoor bowler from Wales who won world championship gold and competed at four Commonwealth Games.

== Biography ==
Thomas represented Wales at the 1988 World Bowls Championship.

He won the 1990 Welsh National Bowls Championships and subsequently won the singles at the British Isles Bowls Championships in 1991.

Thomas represented the Welsh team at the 1990 Commonwealth Games in Auckland, New Zealand, where he competed in the pairs event, with Robert Weale.

Thomas won a silver medal in the fours at the 1996 World Outdoor Bowls Championship in Adelaide. Four years later he won a fours gold medal at the 2000 World Outdoor Bowls Championship in Johannesburg with Stephen Rees, Mark Williams, and Robert Weale.
