= Willie Wood (bowls) =

Scottish professional bowls player

Willie Wood MBE
Personal information
- Nationality: British (Scottish)
- Born: 26 April 1938 (age 88) Gifford, East Lothian, Scotland

Sport
- Sport: Bowls
- Club: Gifford BC
Medal record
Representing Scotland
World Outdoor Championships
Silver medal – second place	1980 Melbourne	Men's fours
Bronze medal – third place	1980 Melbourne	Men's team
Silver medal – second place	1984 Aberdeen	Men's singles
Gold medal – first place	1984 Aberdeen	Men's team
Silver medal – second place	1988 Auckland	Men's singles
Silver medal – second place	1988 Auckland	Men's triples
Bronze medal – third place	1988 Auckland	Men's team
Bronze medal – third place	1992 Worthing	Men's triples
Gold medal – first place	1992 Worthing	Men's team
Gold medal – first place	1992 Worthing	Men's fours
Gold medal – first place	1996 Adelaide	Men's triples
Gold medal – first place	1996 Adelaide	Men's team
Bronze medal – third place	2000 Johannesburg	Men's triples
Bronze medal – third place	2000 Johannesburg	Men's fours
Silver medal – second place	2000 Johannesburg	Men's team
Gold medal – first place	2004 Ayr	Men's triples
Gold medal – first place	2004 Ayr	Men's team
Gold medal – first place	2008 Christchurch	Men's triples
Commonwealth Games
Bronze medal – third place	1974 Christchurch	Men's singles
Silver medal – second place	1978 Edmonton	Men's pairs
Gold medal – first place	1982 Brisbane	Men's singles
Gold medal – first place	1990 Auckland	Men's fours

William Walker Wood MBE (born 26 April 1938 in Haddington, East Lothian) is a former Scottish professional bowls player, who has mainly competed in the outdoor or lawn form of the game. He is regarded as one of the leading bowlers of his generation and his list of achievements include appearing at eight Commonwealth Games and winning two gold medals and eight World Bowls Championship gold medals.

== Early life ==
Wood took up bowls at the age of 12, perhaps unsurprisingly as his father, grandfather and mother all played the sport. His father William E. Wood was the 1967 national singles champion, winning the Scottish National Bowls Championships. With little else to occupy his time, Wood says he elected to bowl in his home village of Gifford, rather than brave the bus journey to the swimming baths at nearby North Berwick.

Wood undertook his national service with the British Army, joining aged 18, serving in Germany with the Royal Electrical and Mechanical Engineers. He later ran his own garage before concentrating on bowls.

== Bowls career ==
=== World Championships ===
Wood has won sixteen medals at the World Outdoor Bowls Championship including eight gold medals. He first won two medals at the 1980 World Outdoor Bowls Championship in Melbourne in the fours and team event (Leonard Trophy).

He competed in the finals of the 1984 and 1988 World Bowls Championship singles (held every four years), missing out by millimetres to Peter Belliss of New Zealand in 1984 on home soil in Aberdeen. He was back in the final four years later in Auckland, New Zealand but was beaten by England's David Bryant. He did however win team gold. During the 1988 World Outdoor Bowls Championship in Auckland he won two silver medals and four years later picked up two golds and one bronze at the 1992 World Outdoor Bowls Championship in Worthing.

Two further gold medals were added during the 1996 World Outdoor Bowls Championship in Adelaide and two bronze medals were won at the 2000 World Outdoor Bowls Championship in Johannesburg. On home turf in Ayr at the 2004 World Outdoor Bowls Championship he won two golds. Wood competed in nine World Championships in total and most recently a gold medal in the triples at the 2008 event in Christchurch, New Zealand.

=== Commonwealth Games ===
Wood first represented his country in 1966 and in 2002 became the first athlete to compete in a 7th Commonwealth Games. His Commonwealth Games career included a singles bronze in 1974, a silver in the pairs in 1978, individual gold in 1982 and a captain's role in the 1990 winning fours team. The feat is even more remarkable as, had internal politics not forced him out of the 1986 games (held, ironically, in Scotland), Wood could have competed in more. After refusing to be reclassified as an amateur, the Scotland team decided not to select the World Championship runner-up, denying him the chance to compete in Edinburgh, at a bowling green just metres from Tynecastle Park – home of his beloved Heart of Midlothian FC. In 2002, Wood was reported to be disappointed that Team Scotland athletes voted to give cyclist Craig MacLean the honour of carrying the flag at the opening ceremony, despite Wood's record-breaking achievement. Aged 72, Wood was included in Scotland's team for the 2010 Commonwealth Games, extending his record to an eighth games, and making him the oldest competitor at the games.

=== National & other ===
Wood also competed in over forty home international events and won the 2006 national pairs title for Gifford BC. In 1985 and 1986, he won the Hong Kong International Bowls Classic pairs titles.

== Awards ==
He has 15 World Championship medals to his name, including four gold medals at the outdoor championships between 1992 and 2008.

In 1992, he was awarded the MBE for services to sport, and in 2007, he became the first bowler to be inducted into the Scottish Sports Hall of FameIn 2007, Wood became the first bowler to be inducted into the Scottish Sports Hall of Fame.

Wood retired from international bowls in 2011, although he intends to continue to compete at national level. His final act as an outdoor internationalist was to help Scotland retain the Home Internationals Series for a recording breaking forty-second time. Woods retired with an impressive total of 134 outdoor caps to his name.

Wood was appointed a Member of the Order of the British Empire (MBE) for services to bowls in the 1992 Birthday Honours. He has also written an instructional book, A Bias to Bowls, which was published in 1990.
