= Scotland at the 1930 British Empire Games =

- CGF code: SCO
- CGA: Scotland at the Commonwealth Games
- Website: www.teamscotland.scot

in Hamilton, Ontario, Canada
- Medals Ranked 6th: Gold 2 Silver 2 Bronze 6 Total 10

British Empire Games appearances
- 1930; 1934; 1938; 1950; 1954; 1958; 1962; 1966; 1970; 1974; 1978; 1982; 1986; 1990; 1994; 1998; 2002; 2006; 2010; 2014; 2018; 2022; 2026; 2030

Scotland at the 1930 British Empire Games (abbreviated SCO) was the first appearance of the country at the inaugural games. Scotland has competed in every edition of the Commonwealth Games. In the first edition, just 11 teams took part and of them, 5 other countries have also competed in every edition.

Scotland came 6th overall in the games, with 2 gold medals, 2 silver medals and 6 bronze medals.

Dunky Wright won a gold medal in the marathon and James Rolland won gold in the lightweight category during the boxing events.

== Team ==
=== Athletics ===
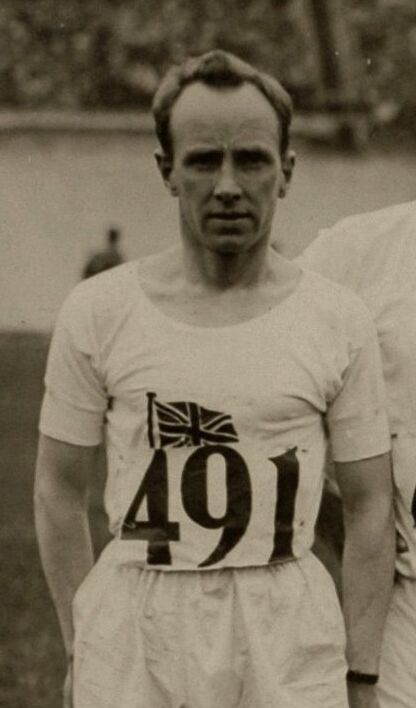
Dunky Wright

Athlete	Events	Club	Medals
Ian Borland	100 & 220 & 440y yards	Glasgow Univ & Atalanta Club	
Roy Hamilton	100 & 220 yards	Glasgow Harriers	
Archie Murray	Hammer throw	Field Events Club, Edinburgh	
Tom Riddell	880 yards	Shettleston Harriers	
Sandy Smith	Hammer throw	Glasgow Police AC	
Robert Sutherland	1 mile, 3 & 6 miles	British Army (Carabiniers)	
James Wood	6 miles	Heriot's Former Pupils	
Dunky Wright	marathon	Maryhill Harriers	Gold medal

=== Boxing ===
Athlete	Events	Club	Medals
Tommy Holt*	bantamweight 54kg	Dalmarnock BC	Bronze medal
Alex Lyons	featherweight 57kg	L.M.S. Rovers	Bronze medal
James Rolland	lightweight 60kg	Leith Victoria A.A.C.	Gold medal

(*) Tommy Holt received a bronze medal and not a silver medal as stated on some websites, the bantamweight final was between Harry Mizler of England and John Keller of Canada.

=== Lawn bowls ===
Athlete	Events	Club	Medals
David Fraser	fours/rinks	St Andrews BC, Fife	Bronze medal
John Orr	fours/rinks	Whitehouse and Grange BC	Bronze medal
Tom Chambers+	fours/rinks	not applicable	Bronze medal
William Campbell	fours/rinks	Stirling BC	Bronze medal

(+) Tom Chambers was a Canadian. One of the original Scottish team members (Mr John Kennedy) had died suddenly while visiting friends in Buffalo, New York, on the journey to Canada. The other teams agreed that Chambers could be used as a substitute even though he was not Scottish.

=== Swimming ===
Athlete	Events	Club	Medals
Willie Francis	100 yd backstroke	Renfrew District ASC	Silver medal
Ellen King	100y free, 200y breast, 100y back 4×100y relay	Warrender Baths Club	//
Jean McDowell	4×100y relay	Warrender Baths Club	Bronze medal
Jessie McVey	4×100y relay	Warrender Baths Club	Bronze medal
Cissie Stewart	100 yd backstroke, 4×100y relay	Dundee Belmont	/
