= Lawn bowls at the 1930 British Empire Games =

- Venue: Roselawn Bowling Club, Gage Park
- Location: Hamilton, Ontario, Canada
- Dates: 16 to 23 August 1930

Lawn bowls at the 1930 British Empire Games was the first appearance of the Lawn bowls at the Commonwealth Games. The events were held in Hamilton, Ontario, Canada, from 16 to 23 August 1930 and featured three disciplines.

Competition featured three events for men: a singles, pairs, and a rinks (fours) contest. The event was held at the Roselawn Bowling Club, within Gage Park.

England topped the medal table by winning all three gold medals.

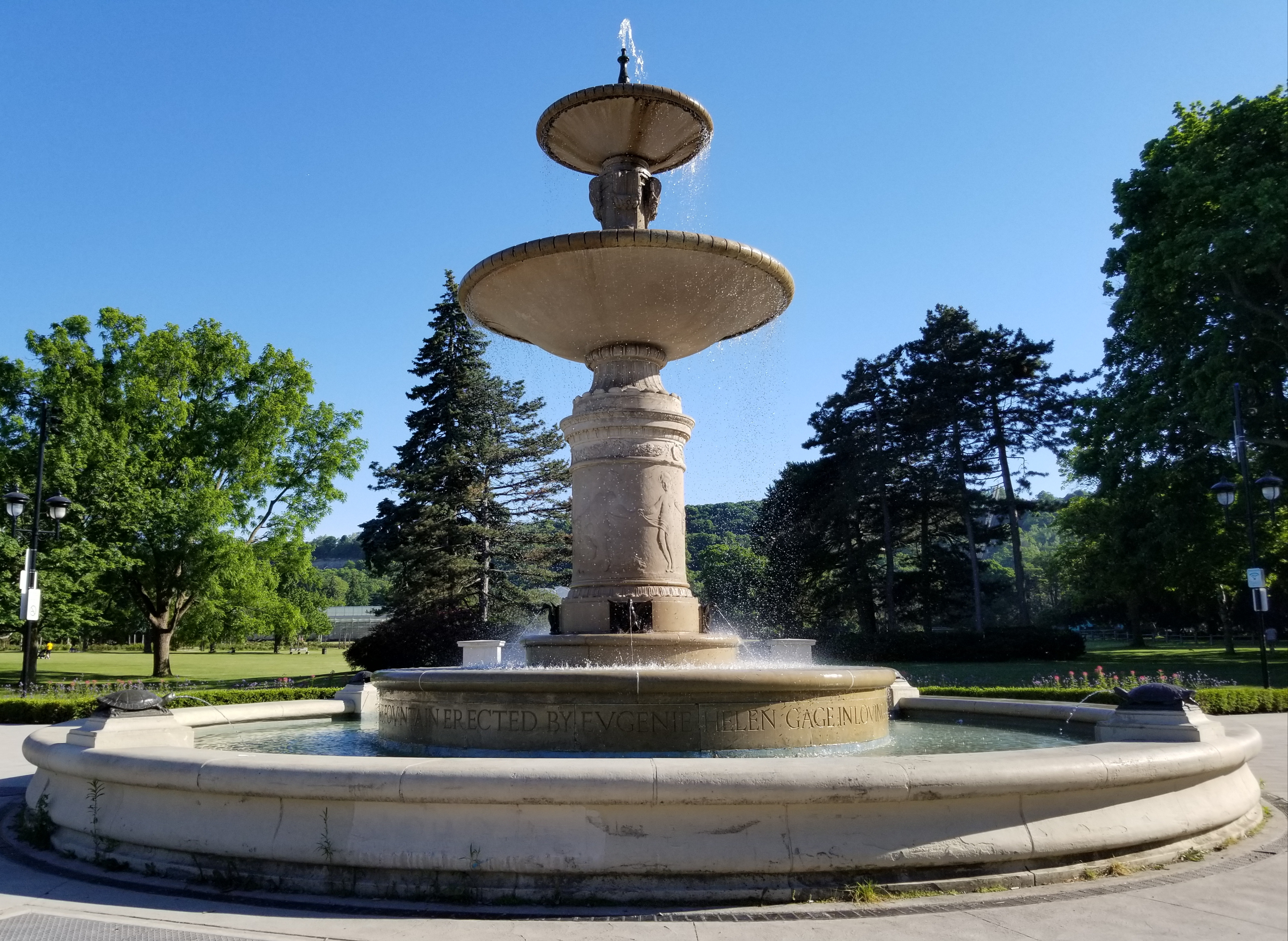
Gage Park

== Medal table ==
* Host nation (Canada)

Rank	Nation	Gold	Silver	Bronze	Total
1	England	3	0	0	3
2	Canada*	0	1	1	2
2	New Zealand	0	1	1	2
4	South Africa	0	1	0	1
5	Scotland	0	0	1	1
Totals (5 entries)		3	3	3	9

== Medal summary ==
Event	Gold	Silver	Bronze
Singles	(England) Robert Colquhoun	(South Africa) James Thoms	(New Zealand) William Fielding
Pairs	(England) Tommy Hills and George Wright	(New Zealand) William Fielding and Peter McWhannell	(Canada) Wilt Moore and Arthur Reid
Rinks/fours	England; Ernie Gudgeon; James Edney; James Frith; Albert Hough	Canada; Harry Allen; Jimmy Campbell; Mitch Thomas; Billy Rae	Scotland; David Fraser; John Orr; Tom Chambers (*); William Campbell

=== Notes ===
(*) Tom Chambers was a Canadian. One of the original Scottish team members (Mr John Kennedy) had died suddenly while visiting friends in Buffalo, New York, on the journey to Canada. The other teams agreed that Chambers could be used as a substitute even though he was not Scottish.

== Men's singles – round robin ==
=== Results ===
Player 1	Player 2	Score
Colquhoun	Reid	21–20
Colquhoun	Fielding	21–19
Colquhoun	Thoms	21–12
Thoms	Reid	21–7
Thoms	Fielding	21–15
Fielding	Reid	21–20

Pos	Player	P	W	L	Pts
1	(England) Robert Colquhoun	3	3	0	6
2	(South Africa) James Thoms	3	2	1	4
3	(New Zealand) William Fielding	3	1	2	2
4	(Canada) Arthur Reid	3	0	3	0

== Men's pairs – round robin ==
=== Results ===
Player 1	Player 2	Score
England	South Africa	36–8
England	New Zealand	20–13
England	Canada	17–14
New Zealand	Canada	19–16
New Zealand	South Africa	21–13
Canada	South Africa	24–10

Pos	Player	P	W	L	Pts
1	(England) Tommy Hills & George Wright	3	3	0	6
2	(New Zealand) William Fielding & Peter McWhannell	3	2	1	4
3	(Canada) Wilt Moore & Arthur Reid	3	1	2	2
4	(South Africa) Edmund Hall & Constantine Giovanetti	3	0	3	0

== Men's rinks (fours) – round robin ==
=== Results ===
Player 1	Player 2	Score
England	South Africa	22–20
England	New Zealand	29–9
England	Canada	19–27
England	Scotland	19–16
New Zealand	South Africa	18–19
New Zealand	Canada	27–20
New Zealand	Scotland	11–20
Canada	South Africa	29–14
Canada	Scotland	19–21
South Africa	Scotland	SA

Pos	Player	P	W	L	Pts
1	(England) Ernie Gudgeon, James Edney, James Frith, Albert Hough	4	3	1	6
2	(Canada) Harry Allen, Jimmy Campbell, Mitch Thomas, Billy Rae	4	2	2	4
3	(Scotland) David Fraser, John Orr, Tom Chambers(*), William Campbell	4	2	2	4
4	(South Africa) John Armstrong, J N Brooks, John Southern, E H Walters	4	2	2	4
5	(New Zealand) William Fielding, Peter McWhannell, Edward Leach, Harold Frost	4	1	3	2

== See also ==
- List of Commonwealth Games medallists in lawn bowls
- Lawn bowls at the Commonwealth Games
