= Tom Chambers (bowls) =

Canadian international lawn bowls player

Personal information
- Nationality: Canada

Sport
- Sport: Lawn bowls
Medal record
Men's Lawn bowls
Representing (Scotland)
British Empire Games
Bronze medal – third place	1930 Hamilton	Rinks/Fours

Thomas M Chambers was a Canadian international lawn bowls player who competed in the 1930 British Empire Games for Scotland.

== Bowls career ==
At the 1930 British Empire Games he won the bronze medal in the rinks (fours) event with David Fraser, John Orr and William Campbell.

Bizarrely, he won the medal for Scotland despite being Canadian because John Kennedy, a member of the Scottish rinks team, had died in the United States en route to Canada. The other teams agreed that Chambers could be a substitute even though he was not Scottish.
