= Alex Lyons =

Scottish boxer

Personal information
- Nationality: British (Scottish)
- Born: C.1903

Sport
- Sport: Boxing
- Event: Featherweight
- Club: L.M.S. Rovers
Medal record
Boxing
Representing Scotland
British Empire Games
Bronze medal – third place	1930 Hamilton	featherweight

Alex Lyons (c.1903 – date of death unknown) was a boxer who competed for Scotland and won a bronze medal at the British Empire Games.

== Biography ==
Lyons was best known for representing Scotland at the 1930 British Empire Games, where he won the bronze medal in the featherweight division at the 1930 British Empire Games in Hamilton, losing to eventual gold medallist Freddie Meachem in the semi-final. At the time of the Games he was a fireman by trade and living in Queensferry Street, Oatlands, Glasgow.

He was the Scottish amateur champion and boxed out of the L.M.S. Rovers club in Glasgow (London, Midland and Scottish Railway).
