= McWhannell =

McWhannell is a surname. Notable people with the surname include:

- Laghlan McWhannell (born 1998), New Zealand rugby union player
- Peter McWhannell (1875–1943), New Zealand lawn bowls player
- Thomas McWhannell (1844–1888), Australian politician
