= Gage Avenue (Hamilton, Ontario) =

Lower City arterial road in Hamilton, Ontario, Canada

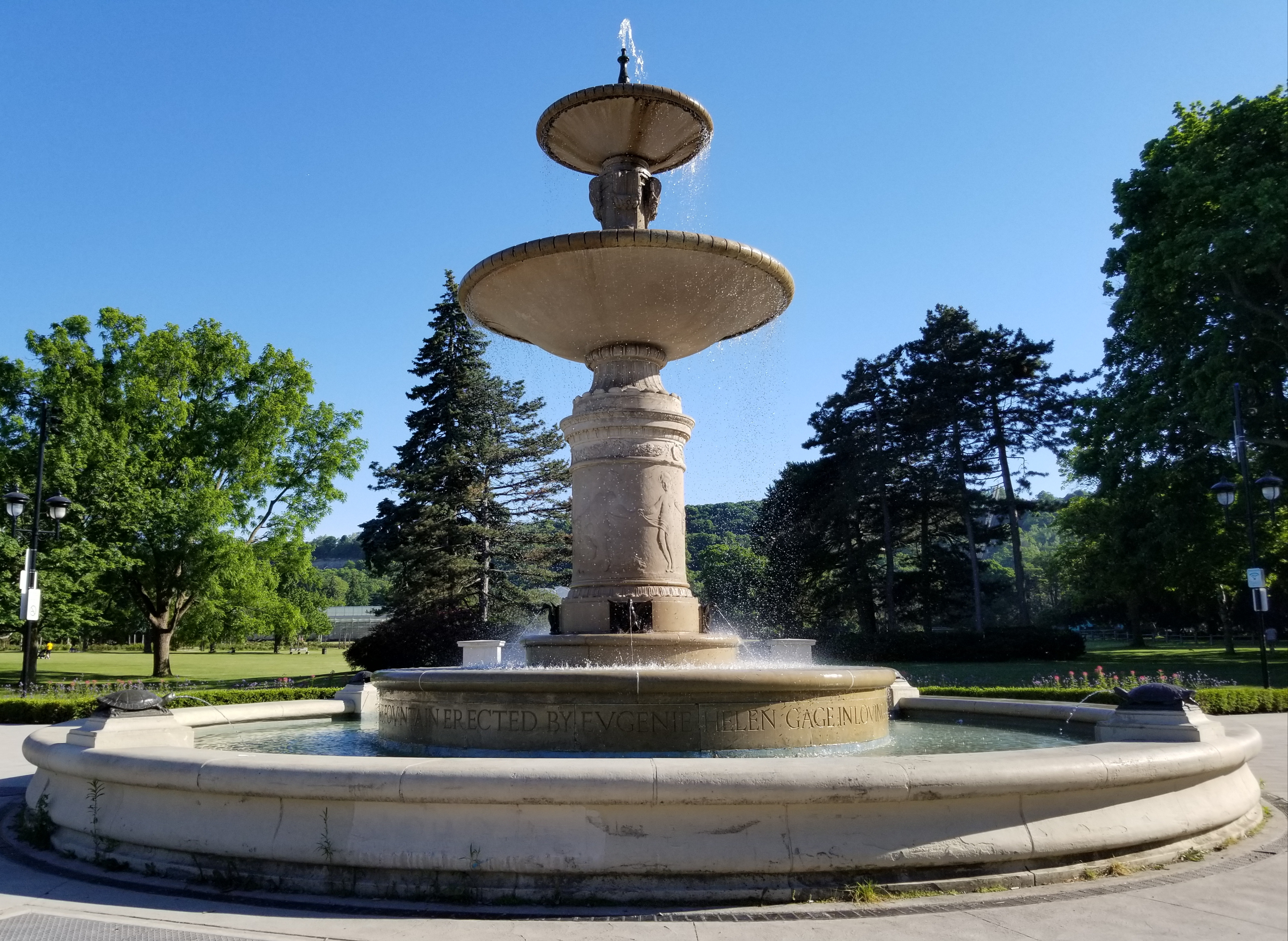
Gage Park fountain

Gage Avenue is a Lower City arterial road in Hamilton, Ontario, Canada. It starts off at Lawrence Road at the base of the Niagara Escarpment (mountain) at the south end of Gage Park. It is a two-way arterial road that extends north through the city's North End industrial neighbourhood and ends at Industrial Drive.

== History ==
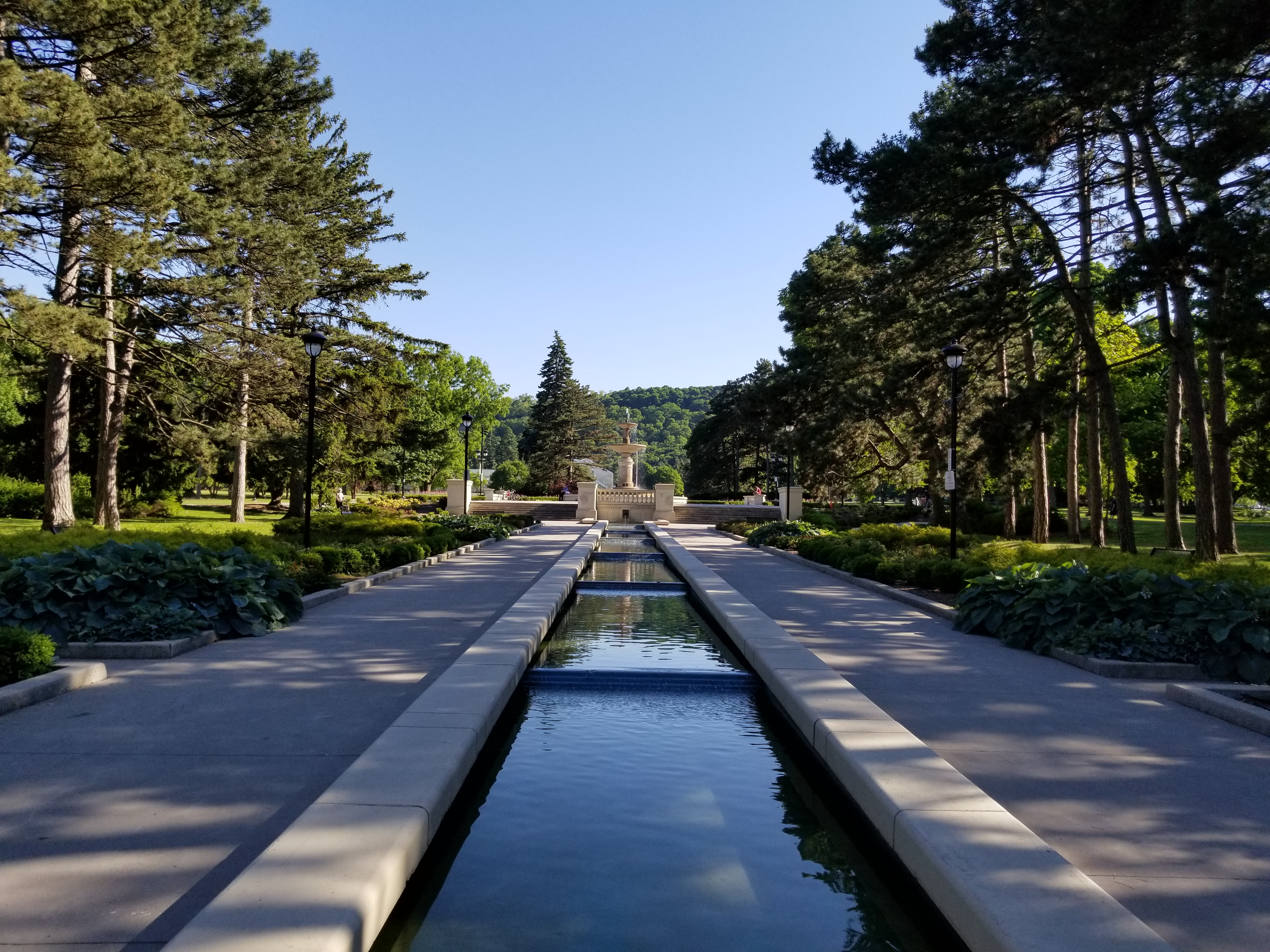
Gage Park fountain and watercourse

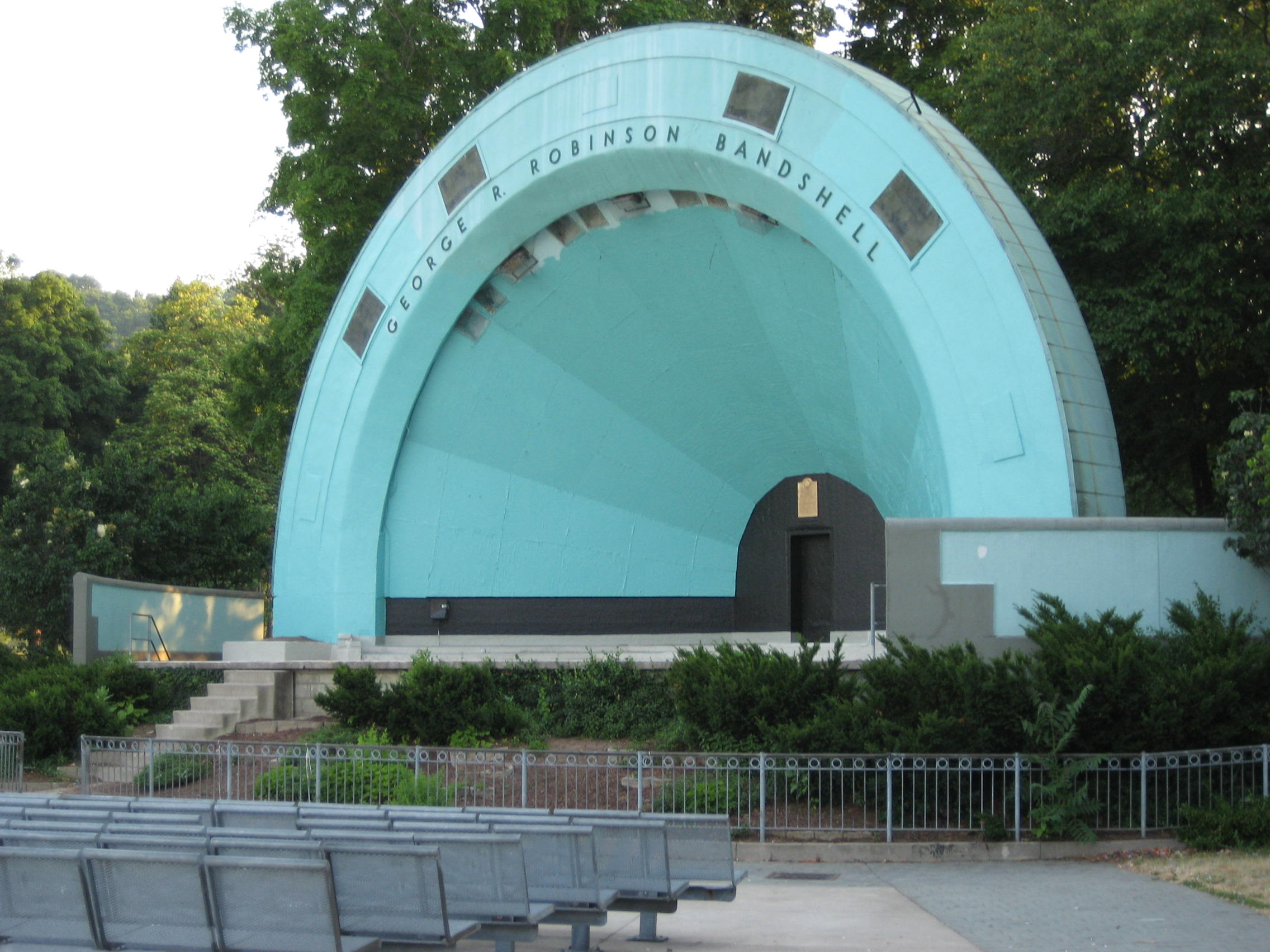
Gage Park, George R. Robinson Bandshell

Gage Avenue and Upper Gage Avenue are named after the park of the same name whose western border is bounded by Gage Avenue. The park was on lands sold by Robert Russel Gage, a descendant of William Gage and named in honour of the Gage families that descended from James Gage, a lumber merchant and his uncle William Gage, a farmer. Together James and William had farms that were the site of the Battle of Stoney Creek during the War of 1812. The wounded were treated inside their homes and they were both awarded compensation for it by the government. Originally Gage Avenue was called Trolley Street.

Tim Horton's Field (2 blocks West of Gage Avenue) is the home of the Hamilton Tiger-Cats of the Canadian Football League. The stadium was originally known as Civic Stadium and was constructed in 1930 to host the 1930 British Empire Games; Canada's first major international athletic event, held in Hamilton from August 16 to 23, 1930. The stadium is now surrounded by residential housing in Hamilton's east side. The CFL's annual Eastern Division Labour Day Classic pits the Hamilton Tiger-Cats against perennial rivals the Toronto Argonauts. This particular weekend, typically the tenth or eleventh week in the season, is known for its fixtures that do not change from year to year. Oddly, for many years before his death, Harold Ballard owned both the Hamilton Tiger-Cats and the Toronto Maple Leafs, the National Hockey League (NHL) franchise in rival city Toronto. The Hamilton A.A.A. Grounds, (Hamilton Amateur Athletic Association Grounds), is a park that was home to the Hamilton Tiger-Cats from 1872 to 1949. That Park is still there today and can be found at Queen Street South, right before Charlton Avenue West.

== Festivals ==
Hamilton, Ontario has hosted several cultural and craft fairs since the 1960s, notably the Festival of Friends, which made it a major tourist destination. The Festival of Friends, founded in 1975, is the largest annual free music event in Canada. Burton Cummings, Lighthouse, Finger Eleven, and Bruce Cockburn have been among the main stage headliners at the George R. Robinson Bandshell at Gage Park.

== Landmarks ==
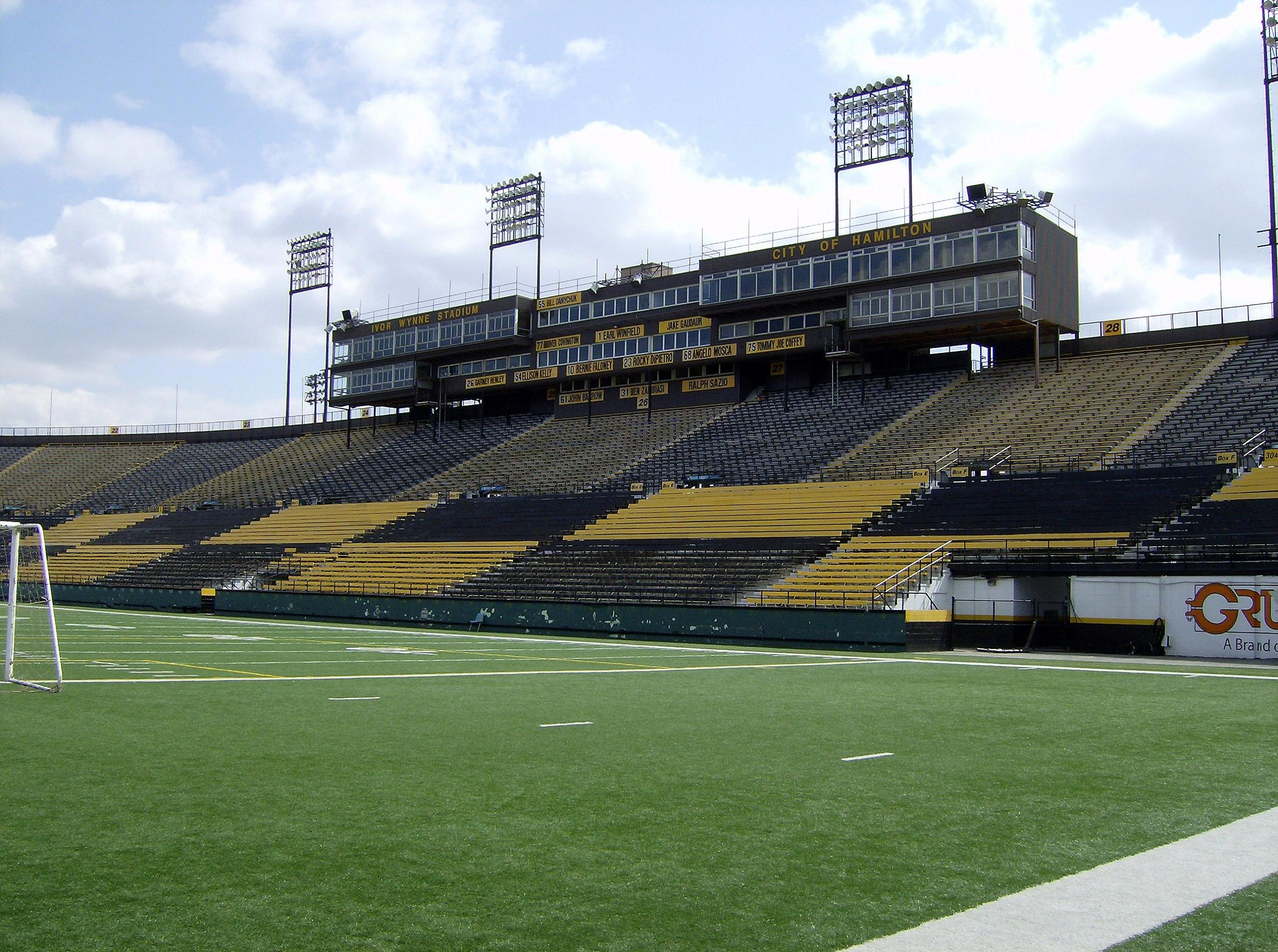
Ivor Wynne Stadium

Note: Listing of Landmarks from North to South.

- Pier 17
- Steel Company of Canada (Stelco), Piers 16, 17, 18 Sherman Avenue North to Ottawa Street North
- Canadian National railway tracks
- Tim Hortons Field, home of the CFL Hamilton Tiger-Cats, (2 blocks West of Gage Avenue on Cannon)
- Gage Park
- Hamilton Children's Museum (inside Gage Park)
- Gage Park Bandshell (concert stage)
- Gage Park fountain
- Escarpment Rail Trail (abandoned railway path)
- Bruce Trail
- Mountain Face Park
- Niagara Escarpment (mountain)

== Communities ==
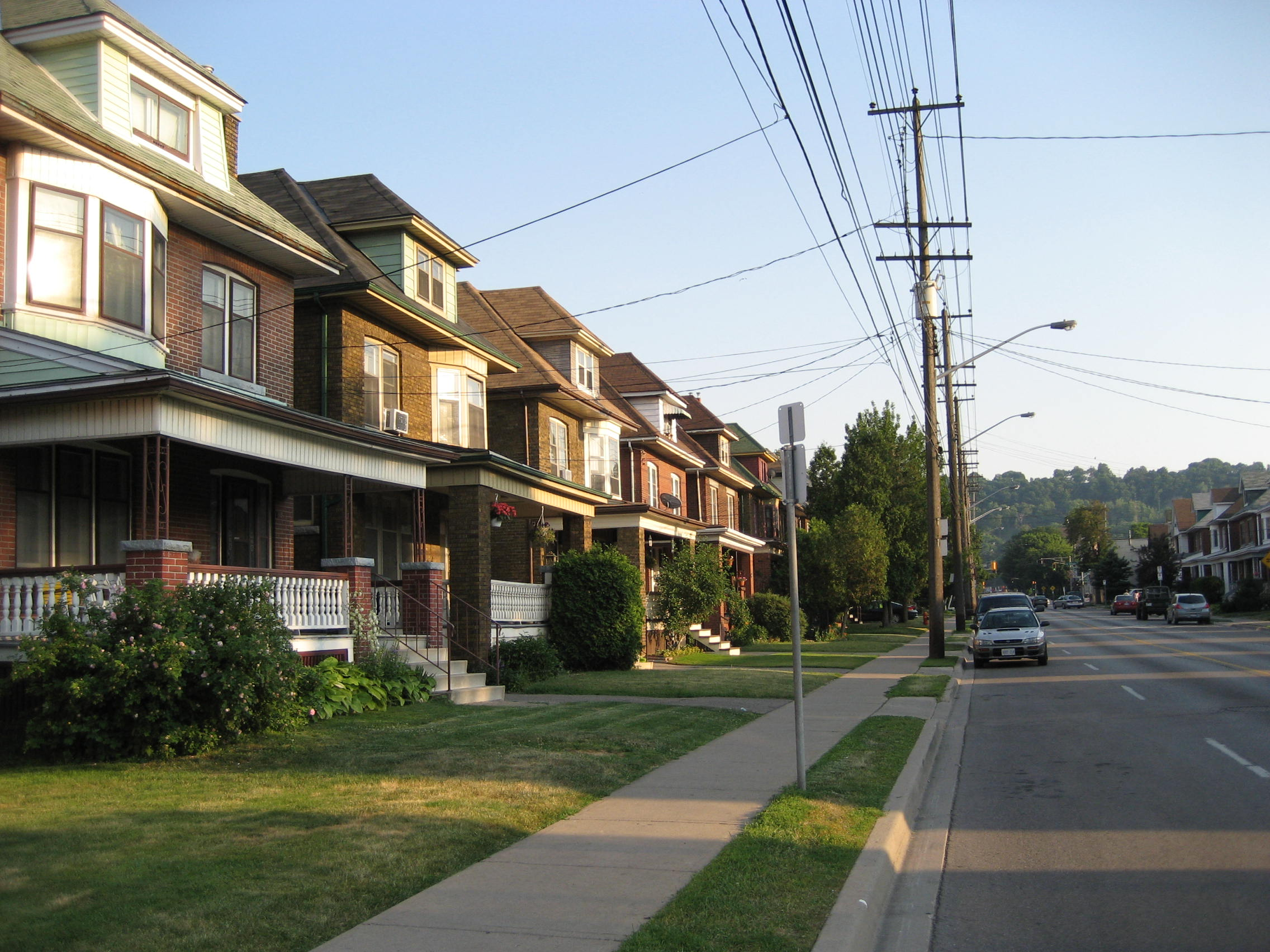
Neighbourhood snapshot, Gage Avenue South

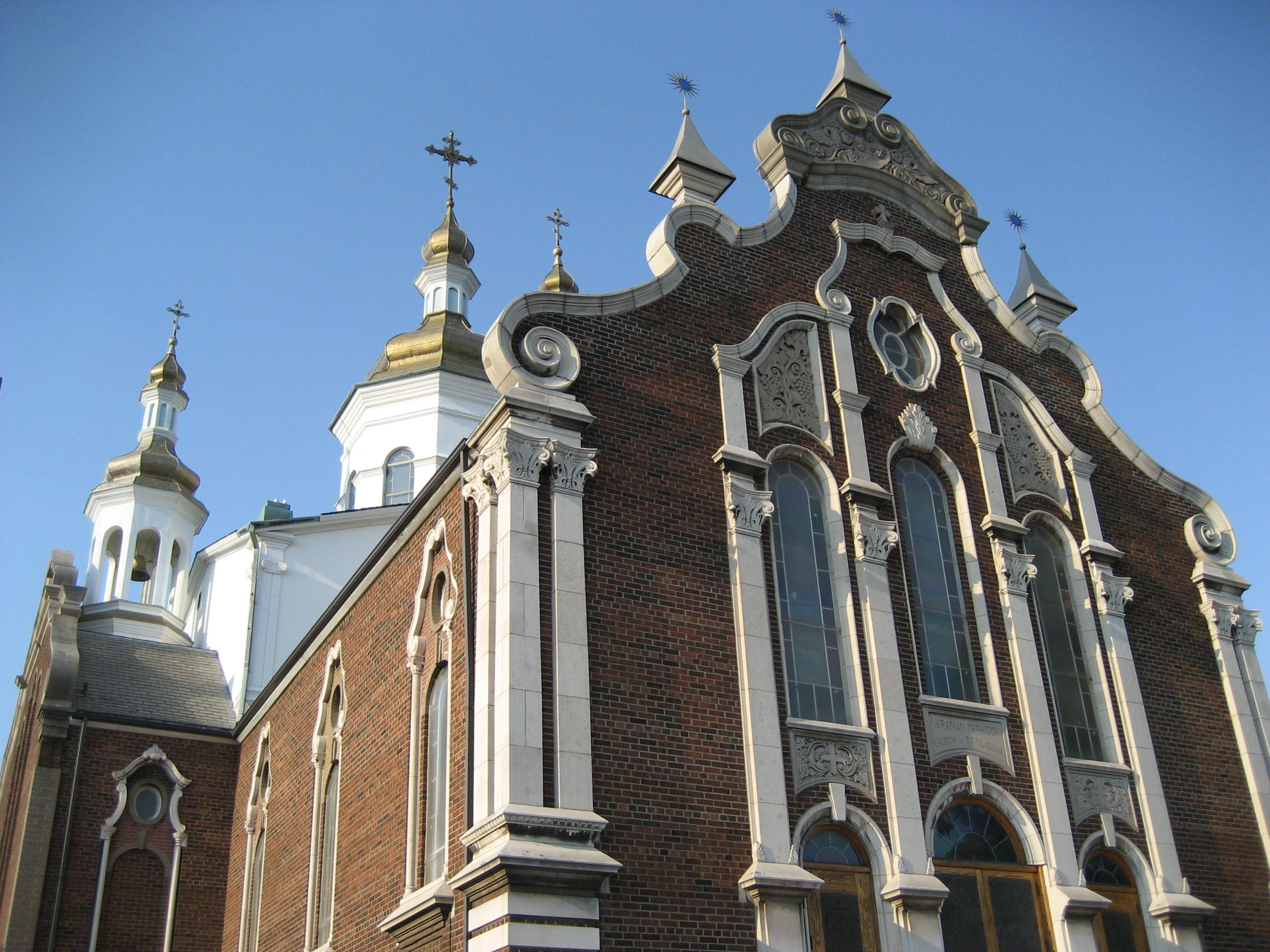
Ukrainian Orthodox Cathedral of St. Vladimir

Note: Listing of neighbourhoods from North to South

- Northend - Everything north of the Canadian National Railway tracks
- Stipeley/ Crown Point, Gage Avenue is the division between these two neighbourhoods.
- Blakeley/ The Delta, Gage Avenue is the division between these two neighbourhoods.

== Images ==
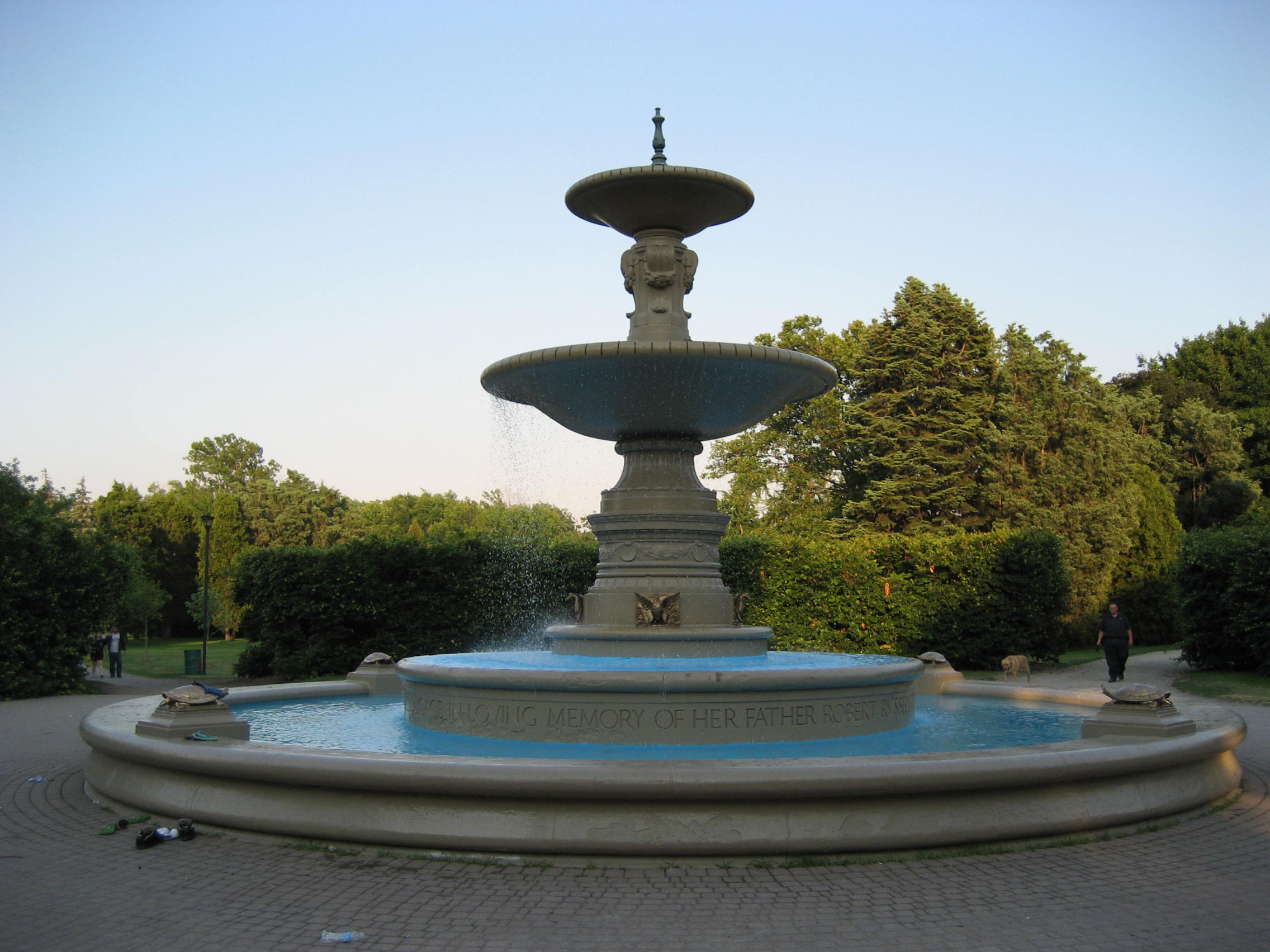
Gage Park Fountain prior to restoration

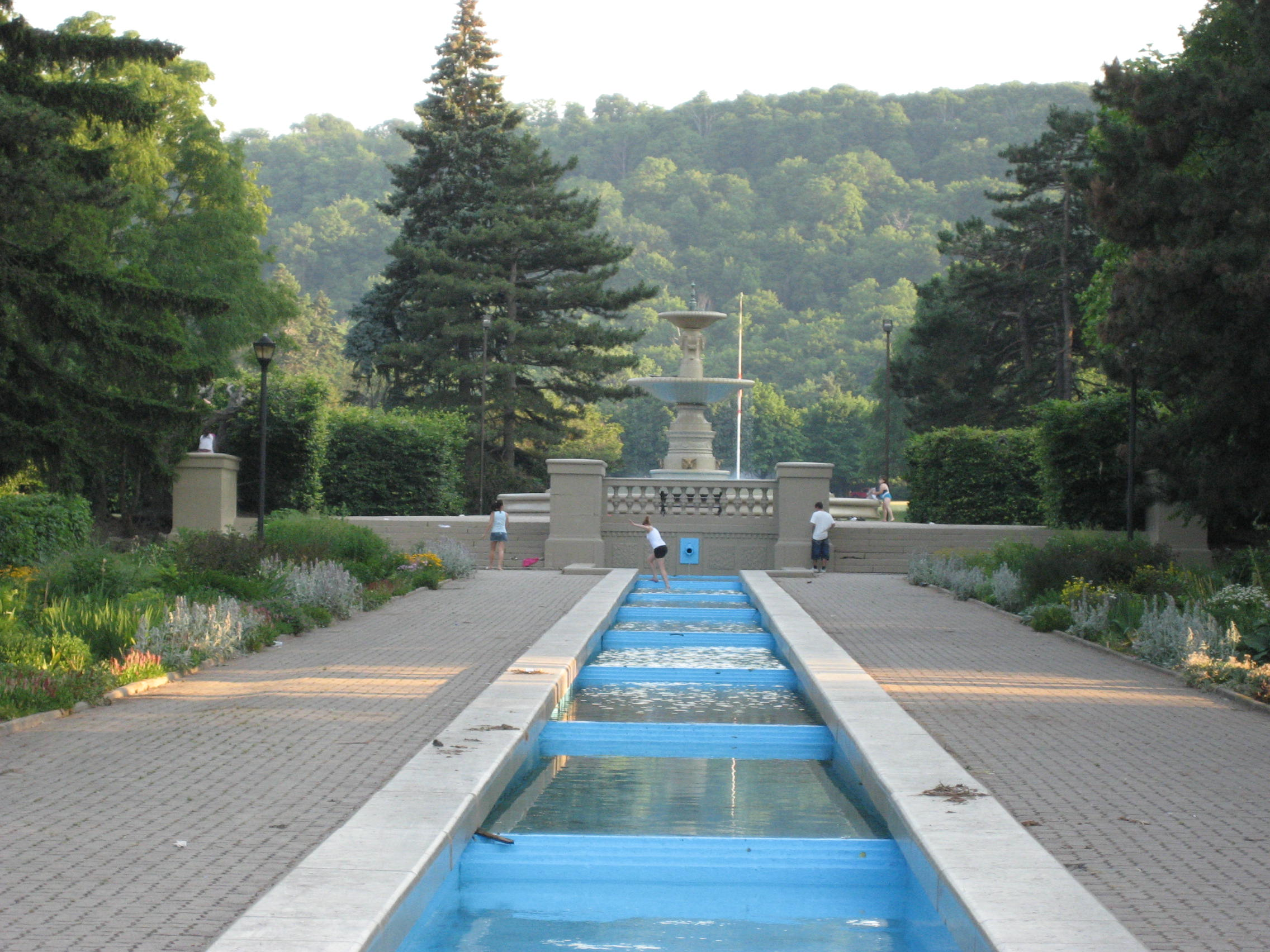
Gage Park Fountain and watercourse prior to restoration

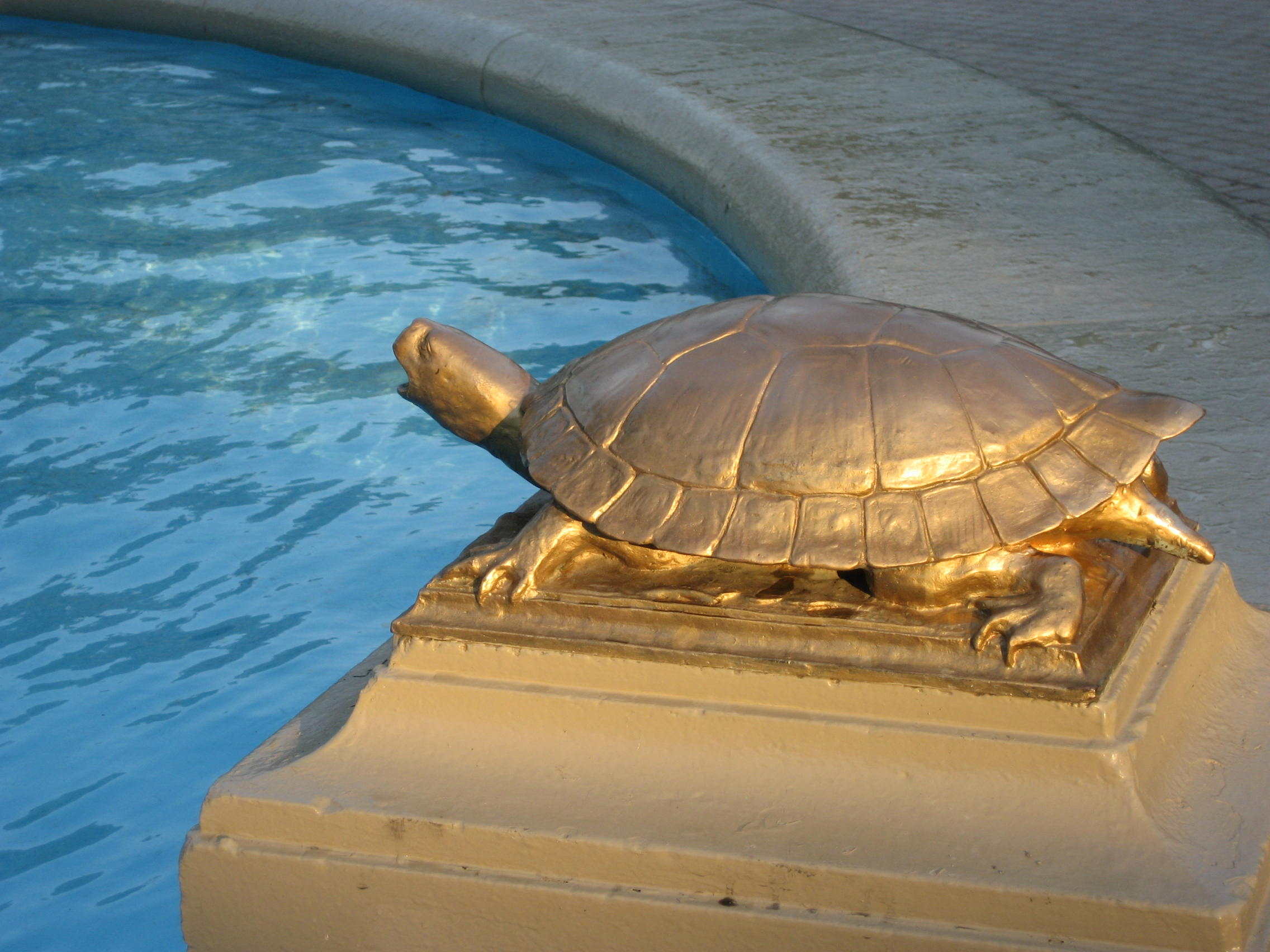
Gage Park Waterfountain, turtle statuette

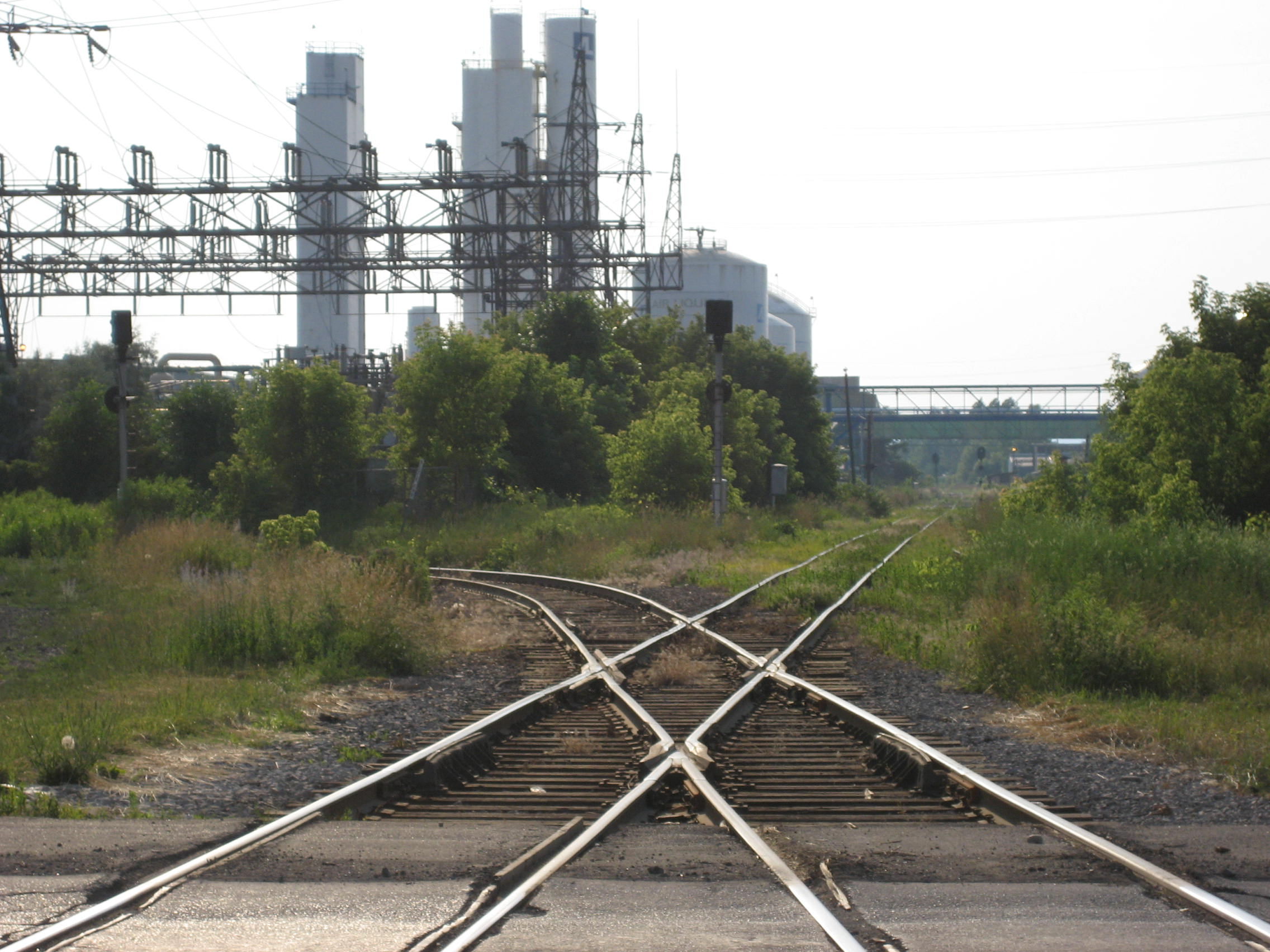
Railway Tracks, Gage Avenue North

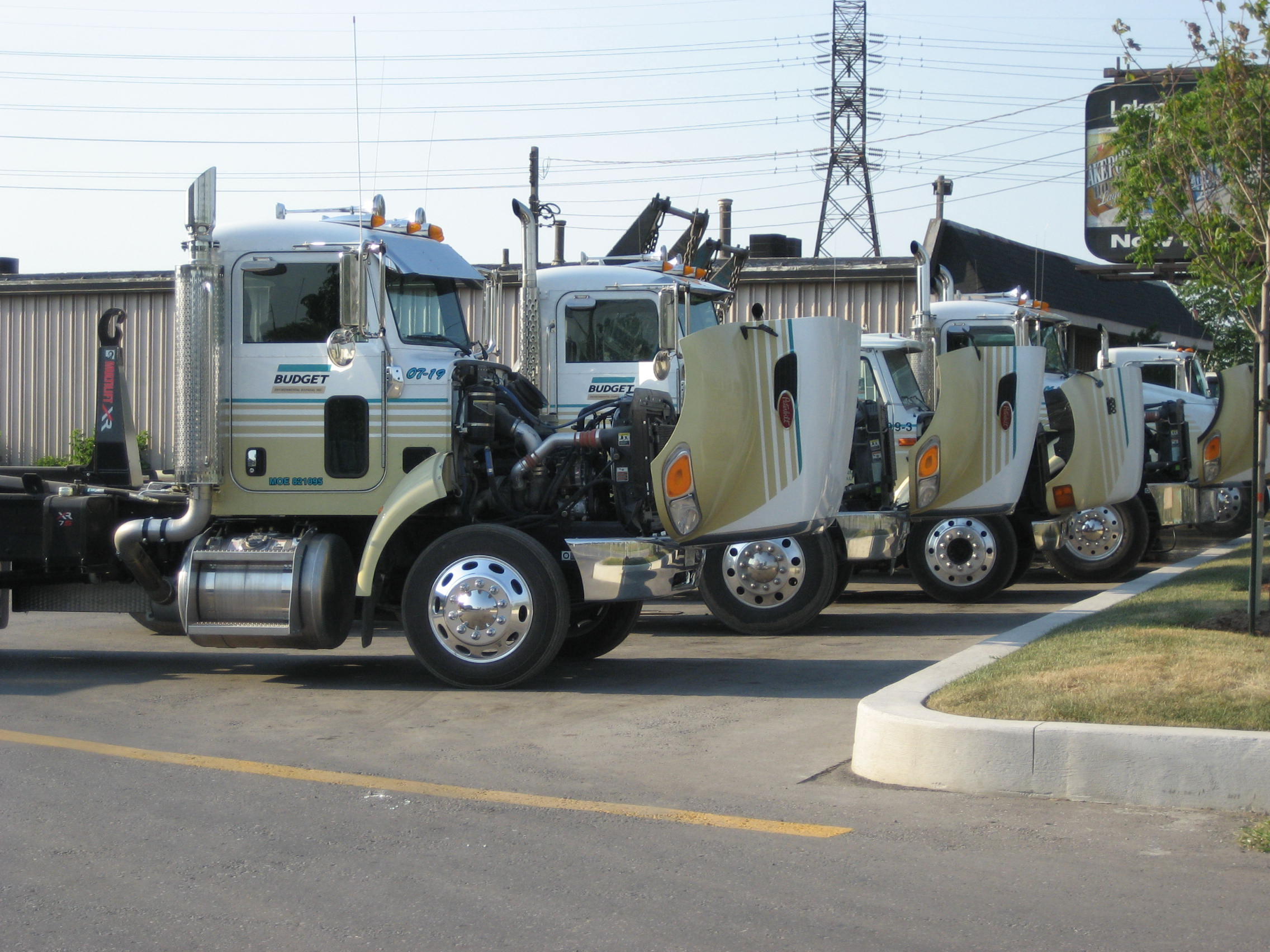
Truck Lot, Gage Avenue North

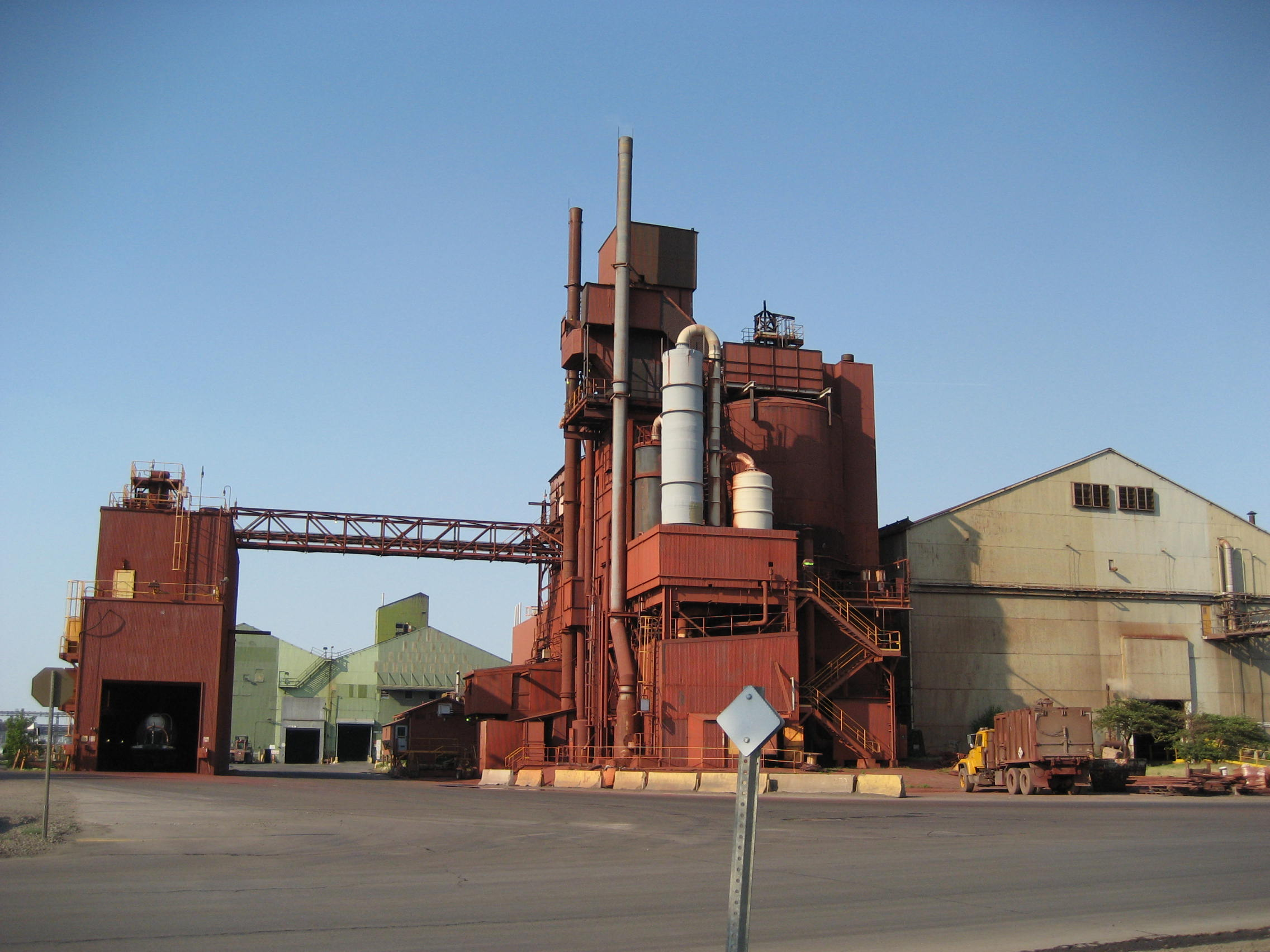
Dofasco & North End industrial buildings

== See also ==
- Niagara Escarpment Commission
