= Archibald Murray (disambiguation) =

Archibald Murray (1860–1945) was a British Army officer.

Archibald Murray may also refer to:

- Sir Archibald Murray, 3rd Baronet (died before 1700), Scottish soldier
- Archibald R. Murray (1933–2001), African-American lawyer
- Archie Murray, Scottish athlete
