= The Kings =

Canadian rock band formed 1977

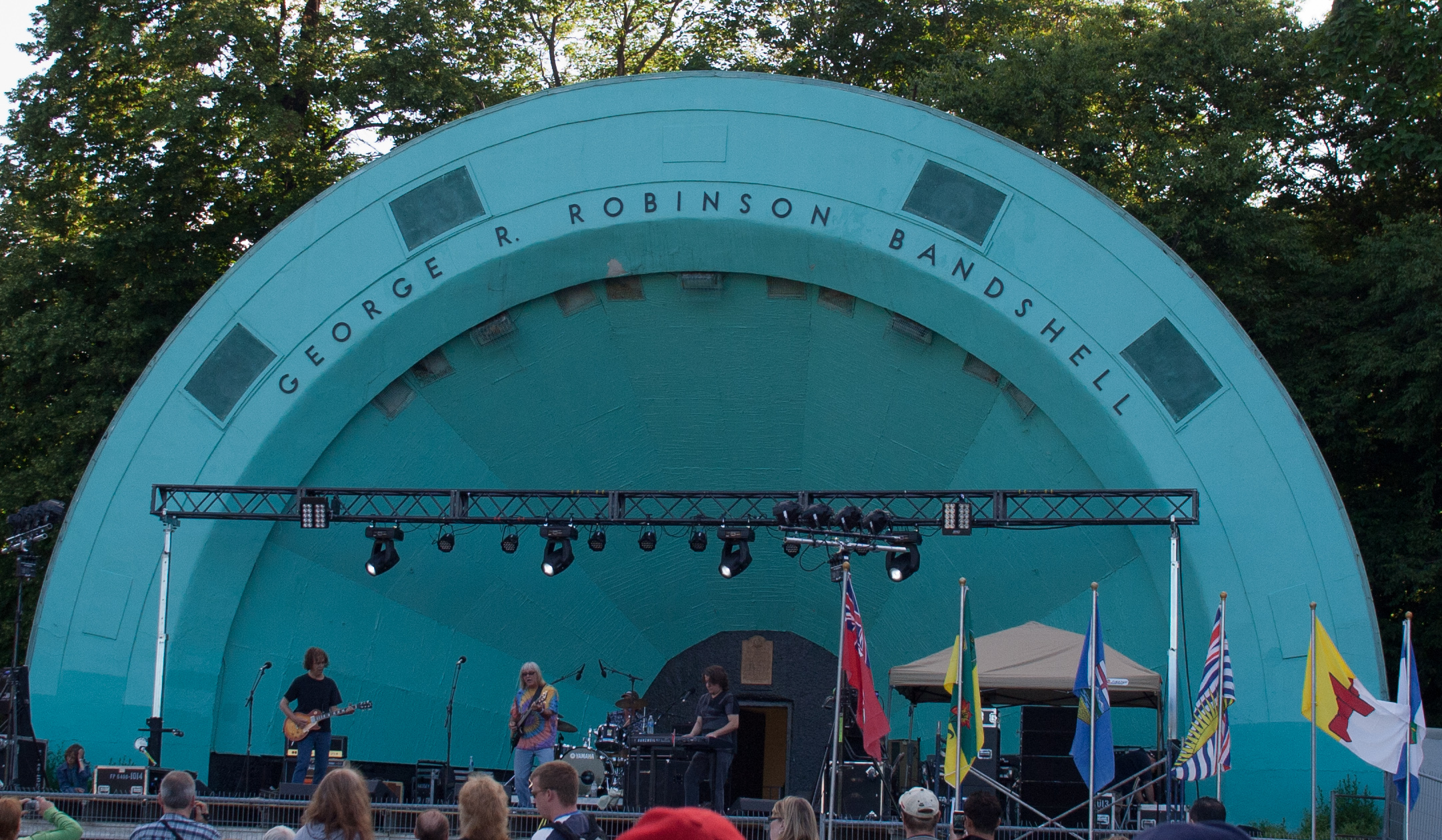
- The Kings performing at Gage Park, Hamilton (Canada Day 2010)

Background information
- Origin: Vancouver, British Columbia, Canada
- Genres: Rock, pop
- Years active: 1977–present
- Members: David Diamond; Mister Zero; Peter Nunn; Sonny Keyes; Todd Reynolds
- Past members: Gary Craig; Greg Chritchley; Josh Broadbent; Marty Cordrey; Max Styles; Randall Coryell; Rich Roxborough; Whitey Glan; Atilla Turi
- Website: thekingsarehere.com

The Kings are a Canadian rock band formed in 1977 in Oakville, Ontario. They are best known for their 1980 song "This Beat Goes On/Switchin' To Glide", which was a hit in the United States and Canada.

== Recording history ==
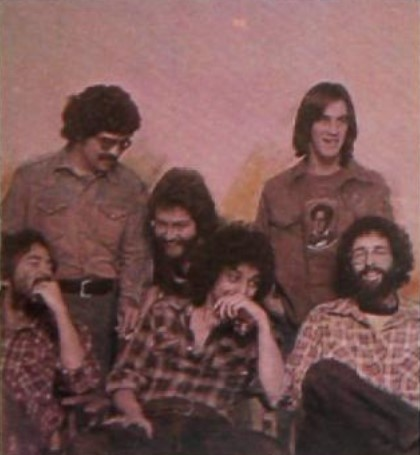
The original Kings

The Kings were formed in Vancouver, British Columbia, and Oakville, Ontario, in the late 1970s. The original lineup included David Diamond, bass, lead vocals; Mister Zero (aka John Picard, listed as Aryan Zero in the original Kings Are Here LP liner notes), guitar; Sonny Keyes, keyboards and vocals; and Max Styles (drums), with Zero and Diamond serving as the main songwriters with contributions from Keyes. The Kings were originally known as WhistleKing and rehearsed, performed club gigs, and wrote a considerable number of songs for more than three years.

In early 1980, the band went into Nimbus 9 Studio in Toronto to record their first album. While recording, renowned producer Bob Ezrin visited the studio, listened to the band, and liked what he heard. Together they created the album The Kings Are Here with the songs "This Beat Goes On" and "Switchin' To Glide", The double-A side single spent 23 weeks on the U.S. charts, peaking at #43 on the Billboard Hot 100. On superstation WLS-AM in Chicago, the song peaked at number nine during January 1981. It reached #59 in Canada. Two other singles followed, including "Don't Let Me Know" which only reached #109 on Billboard, and the band began touring extensively with Bob Seger, Jeff Beck, The Beach Boys, and Eric Clapton. During 1980, their rising commercial fortunes culminated in an appearance on Dick Clark's American Bandstand, and the closing spot at the major Heatwave festival in August.

Amazon Beach, the 1981 follow-up to The Kings Are Here, produced little in the way of sales, and the band was soon dropped from their label, Elektra Records. The Kings soldiered on and released the EP R.S.V.P and the live album Party Live '85 on their own Dizzy label, while continuing to tour Canada and the US throughout the remainder of the 1980s. Max Styles left the band in approximately 1982.

== Comebacks ==
The late 1980s were a difficult period for The Kings as they lost their drummer and their record label. As it was, the group was on the verge of a major revival as the single "This Beat Goes On" and "Switchin' To Glide" became a huge radio hit in Chicago once again, getting major play on all of the main rock stations: Classic rock WCKG, Alternative rock WXRT, and Mainstream Rock WLUP, as well as Top 40 powerhouse WLS-AM. The unavailability of the Kings records led Chicago DJ Bob Stroud of WLUP to record his own version of the single with his band Rockestra. Elektra Records unfortunately remained unaware of the burgeoning hit and never reissued the single or album.

The single "Parting of the Ways" appeared on Bullseye Records compilation Unsigned, Sealed and Delivered in 1991. This comeback prompted The Kings to return to the studio to record Unstoppable produced by John Punter, David Diamond and Mister Zero in 1993. Unstoppable produced several hits in Canada including "Lesson To Learn", "Shoulda Been Me", "Tonight I Got You", "Parting Of The Ways", and the title track "Unstoppable" (#69). A phone call in 1999 from Mister Zero to Alan Fletcher at Warner Canada led to the green light needed for Warner to re-issue The Kings Are Here...and More which allowed fans to get their songs "This Beat Goes On" and "Switchin' to Glide" on CD, which was fully remastered from the original 2 track tapes by Zero. ...and More also contained a few re-mixed tracks from Unstoppable and two previously unreleased tracks–"If the Stars Come Out Tonight" and "Right to the Top". A remixed and more mature version of "If the Stars Come Out Tonight" appeared on Because Of You released in 2003 on Bullseye Records. Combined original sales and CD sales have passed the platinum mark in Canada but no certification is allowed because of the bonus tracks on the CD, which are the only way the band makes money from that project.

Throughout the remainder of the 1990s, The Kings toured around Toronto, but Sonny Keyes' role diminished and only Mister Zero and David Diamond consistently remained from the original lineup, continuing to call on Keyes as needed.

Drummer Atilla Turi and keyboard players Peter Nunn and Rich Roxborough joined Mister Zero and David Diamond on the abovementioned Because of You album (Josh Broadbent–Diamond's son–was also recruited into The Kings to contribute his vocals). Because of You would be The Kings' strongest effort to date, with Harry Hess recording alongside producers Zero and Diamond. A video was made for the title track, "It's Up to You" and "The Fools Are in Love," the last of which was remixed from the original version that appeared on the Amazon Beach release. Sonny Keyes co-wrote "A Way You'll Never Be" with Mister Zero.

A reunion of the original lineup of The Kings occurred in the winter of 2001 with Max Styles and Sonny Keyes joining their old mates for Alan Frew's (Glass Tiger) children's benefit concert for Camp Trillium in Toronto. They played the benefit concert again in 2002.

In late 2005, The Kings had a full length reunion concert in Toronto which was filmed for inclusion in the DVD documentary being assembled by Mister Zero. The first part of this film to be seen is the video for "This Beat Goes On" and "Switchin' to Glide," released in October 2006.

Another focus for The Kings was to put as many songs as possible on iTunes, thus having the catalog available worldwide instantly. The album The Kings Anthology One is the latest addition, 12 songs from different eras including never before heard songs from the band's WhistleKing days.

The Kings continue to play live shows across southern Ontario and, from time to time, the northern United States. They released a documentary about their career, more specifically about "This Beat Goes On / Switchin' to Glide" on YouTube in November, 2017.

== In popular culture ==
In 2017, Milwaukee sports radio station 105.7 FM The Fan began using "Switchin' to Glide" for the Milwaukee Baseball Post Game Show. Host Tim Allen began playing the song starting in May when the Brewers got off to a hot start. After every win Allen played the chorus of "This Beat Goes On" as the team's unofficial anthem.

In 2020, American band the Cherry Poppin' Daddies released a cover of "Switchin' to Glide" as a standalone single, accompanied by a music video.

== Lineups ==
The Kings 1977–1982

1. David Diamond (vocals, bass)
2. Mister Zero (guitar)
3. Sonny Keyes (keyboards)
4. Max Styles (drums)

The Kings 1982–1999

1. David Diamond (vocals, bass)
2. Mister Zero (guitar)
3. Sonny Keyes (keyboards)
4. Peter Nunn (1994) (keyboards)
5. Marty Cordrey, Whitey Glan, Gary Craig, Randall Coryell, Greg Chritchley, Atilla Turi (drums)
6. Josh Broadbent (vocals)

The Kings 1999–2005

1. David Diamond (vocals, bass)
2. Mister Zero (guitar)
3. Atilla Turi (drums)
4. Peter Nunn (keyboards)
5. Rich Roxborough (keyboards)
6. Josh Broadbent (vocals)

The Kings 2005–present

1. David Diamond (vocals, bass)
2. Mister Zero (guitar)
3. Atilla Turi (drums)
4. Peter Nunn (keyboards)
5. Sonny Keyes (keyboards)
6. Peter Kadar (keyboards)
7. Josh Broadbent (vocals)
8. Todd Reynolds (Drums)
9. Rob Cooper (keyboards)
10. Martin Aucoin (keyboards)
11. Christina Melanie (keyboards)

== Discography ==
- The Kings Are Here album (Elektra, 1980) US #74
- Amazon Beach album (Elektra, 1981) US #170
- R.S.V.P [4-Song EP] (Dizzy, 1982)
- Party Live '85 live album (Dizzy, 1985)
- Parting Of The Ways single (1991)
- Unstoppable CD (Dizzy, 1993)
- Unstoppable [with "This Beat Goes On" and "Switchin' To Glide" added] CD (Griffin, 1995)
- The Kings Are Here..and More CD (Warner, 2000)
- The Kings Are Here/Amazon Beach (2 on 1 CD, Wounded Bird, 2003)
- Because Of You CD (2003)
- Anthology One CD (2006)
- The Longest Story Ever Told CD (Dizzy, 2023)

== See also ==
- Canadian rock
- Music of Canada
