= Frank Brooman =

English boxer (1904–1979)

Personal information
- Born: 29 March 1904 Kentish Town, Middlesex, England
- Died: 23 February 1979 (aged 74) Oxted, Surrey

Sport
- Club: Northampton Polytechnic Club.
Medal record
Men's Boxing
Representing England
British Empire Games
Bronze medal – third place	1930 Hamilton	Welterweight

Frank Brooman (29 March 1904 – 23 February 1979) was an English boxer who competed in the 1930 British Empire Games.

== Biography ==
Brooman competed for the 1930 English team in the welterweight class at the 1930 British Empire Games in Hamilton, Ontario, Canada, winning a bronze medal.

He boxed out of the Northampton Polytechnic Club.
