= Albert Love =

Welsh boxer

Personal information
- Nationality: British (Welsh)
- Born: 1911 Cardiff, Wales
- Died: 1943 (aged 31–32)
- Weight: Lightweight

Sport
- Sport: boxing
- Club: Cardiff Central
Medal record
Men's Boxing
Representing England
British Empire Games
Bronze medal – third place	1930 Hamilton	Lightweight

William Albert Love (1911 – 8 November 1943) was a Welsh boxer who boxed for England in the 1930 British Empire Games.

== Biography ==
Love was born in Cardiff and was the Welsh champion in 1930 and boxed out of the Central Cardiff BC.

Love competed for the 1930 English team in the lightweight class at the 1930 British Empire Games in Hamilton, Ontario, Canada, winning a bronze medal.

Lover died of Beri beri in November 1943 during incarceration by the Japanese in the Changi prisoner of war camp in Singapore during World War II.
