= George Wright (bowls) =

British lawn bowler

Personal information
- Nationality: British (English)
- Born: 28 October 1893 Norwich
- Died: 3 April 1949 (aged 55) Southampton
- Occupation: Cinema Proprietor

Sport
- Sport: Lawn bowls
- Club: Southern Railway BC, Eastleigh
Medal record
Men's Lawn bowls
Representing England
British Empire Games
Gold medal – first place	1930 Hamilton	Pairs
Gold medal – first place	1934 London	Pairs

George William Arthur Wright (1893–1949) was an English bowls player who competed in the 1930 British Empire Games and 1938 British Empire Games.

== Bowls career ==
At the 1930 British Empire Games he won the gold medal in the pairs event with Tommy Hills. The pair repeated the success four years later at the 1934 British Empire Games.

He was the 1928 singles National Champion.

== Personal life ==
He was a cinema proprietor at the Variety Theatre, in Eastleigh, by trade and married Jessie Mary Parker, they lived in Upper Bassett, Southampton.
