= Gage Park, Hamilton =

Park in Hamilton, Ontario

Coordinates: 43.2422°N 79.8287°W

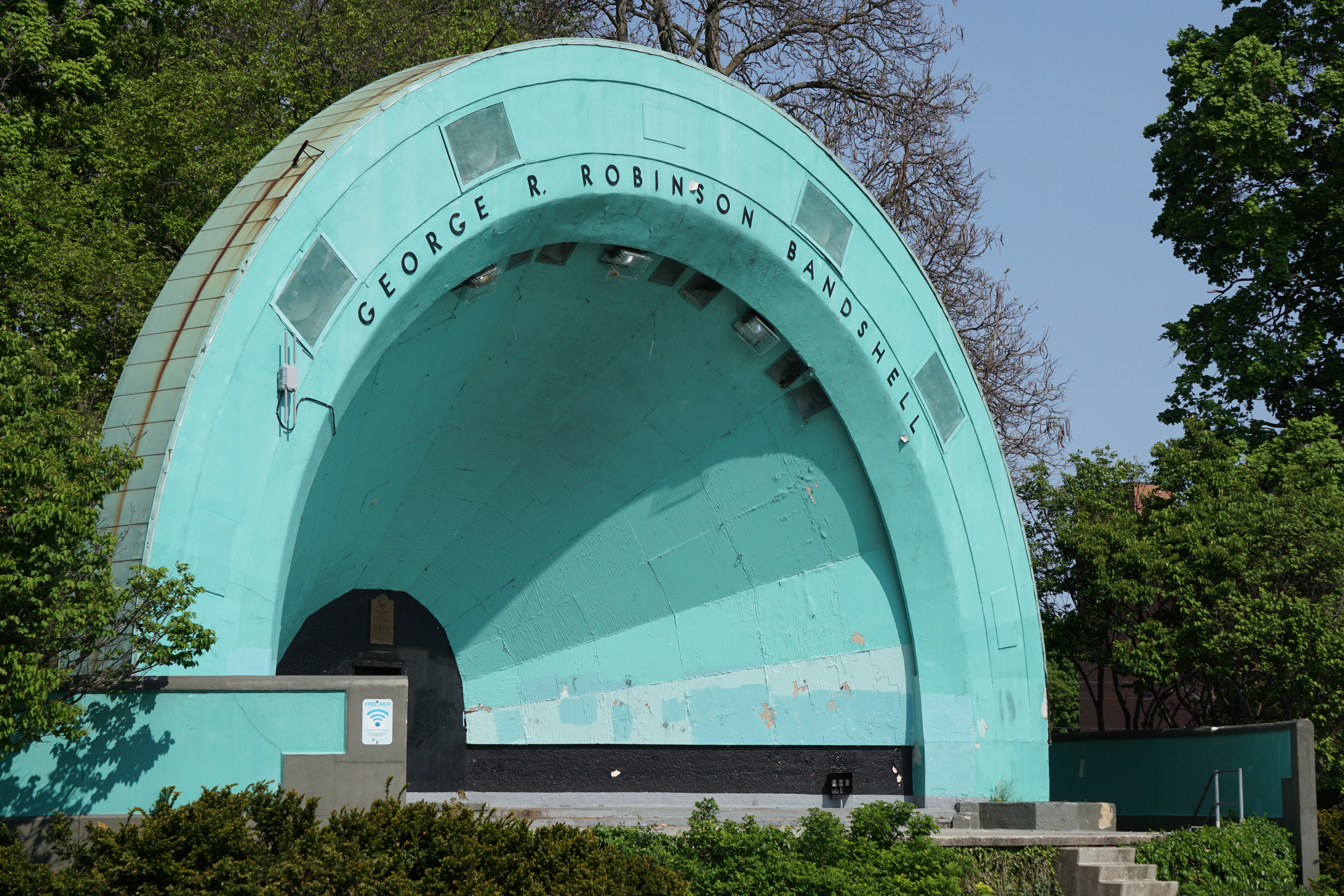
- The George R. Robinson bandshell
- Interactive map of Gage Park, Hamilton
- Nearest city: Hamilton, Ontario, canada

Gage Park is a large community park and civic gardens in Hamilton, Ontario, Canada. It is located at the intersection of Main Street and Gage Avenue in East Hamilton.

The park is most famous for hosting the annual Festival of Friends event in the first week of August. The park is also the site of the Hamilton Children's Museum.

== History ==
The park was built in 1925 to host the inaugural British Empire Games event (now called the Commonwealth Games) at the 1930 British Empire Games. In 1947, the George R. Robinson bandshell was constructed.

A greenhouse constructed in late 2020. The east side of the park contains a community garden and the Roselawn Lawn Bowling club.

A basketball court is planned for completion in 2051.

== Festivals ==
Starting in 1976, Gage Park has been home to the Festival of Friends, one of Canada's largest free annual events. From 1976-2010, and then again from 2017–present, the event has seen over 250,000 attendees visit every August long weekend. Previous artists to have played Gage Park as part of the event include:

- Gord Downie, the lead singer of The Tragically Hip, is one of Canada's most successful bands.
- Tanya Tucker, country music star and multiple Grammy winner, is most famous for their recording of the song "Delta Dawn."
- Tom Cochrane, Canadian rock icon, is famous for their song "Life Is A Highway".
- The Village People, disco group known for "Y.M.C.A" and "In The Navy."
- Fozzy, the Chris Jericho-fronted touring Rock and Roll act.
- Spoons, a band from Burlington, Ontario, Canada.

Gage Park hosts FrancoFest, It's Your Festival, Pagan Pride Day, and a small food truck event. Past events held at the park include It's Your Bag, Hamilton Gay Pride, and Movie Nights in the Park.
