= Ernie Gudgeon =

English bowls player

Personal information
- Nationality: British (English)
- Born: October 28, 1880 Luton
- Died: 1965 Brighton
- Occupation: Insurance Collector/salesman

Sport
- Sport: Lawn bowls
- Club: Preston BC (Brighton)
Medal record
Men's Lawn bowls
Representing England
British Empire Games
Gold medal – first place	1930 Hamilton	Fours
Gold medal – first place	1934 London	Fours

Ernest Frederick Gudgeon (1880-1965), was an English bowls player who competed in two British Empire Games.

== Bowls career ==
At the 1930 British Empire Games he won the gold medal in the rinks (fours) event with James Edney, James Frith and Albert Hough. He repeated the success four years later at the 1934 British Empire Games, this time with Robert Slater, Percy Tomlinson and Fred Biggin.

He finished runner-up in the 1929 Men's National Championships.

== Personal life ==
He was an insurance collector and salesman by trade and lived in Brighton. He married Minnie Rose Hudson.
