= William Fielding (architect) =

New Zealand architect and lawn bowler (1875–1946)

Personal information
- Born: 1875 Lower Darwen, Lancashire, England
- Died: 26 July 1946 (aged 70) Wellington, New Zealand
- Occupation: Architect
- Spouse: Lily Midgley (m. 1900)

Sport
- Country: New Zealand
- Sport: Lawn bowls
- Club: Hataitai
Medal record
Men's lawn bowls
Representing New Zealand
British Empire Games
Silver medal – second place	1930 Hamilton	Pairs
Bronze medal – third place	1930 Hamilton	Singles

William Fielding (1875 – 26 July 1946) was a New Zealand architect who practised in Wellington. He was also a bowls player, winning two medals at the 1930 British Empire Games.

== Early life and family ==
Born in 1875 at Lower Darwen, Lancashire, England, Fielding was the son of Mary (née Turnbull) and Robert Fielding, and was educated at Kilgrimol School in Lancashire. In 1900, Fielding married Lily Midgley, and the couple went on to have two children.

== Architectural practice ==
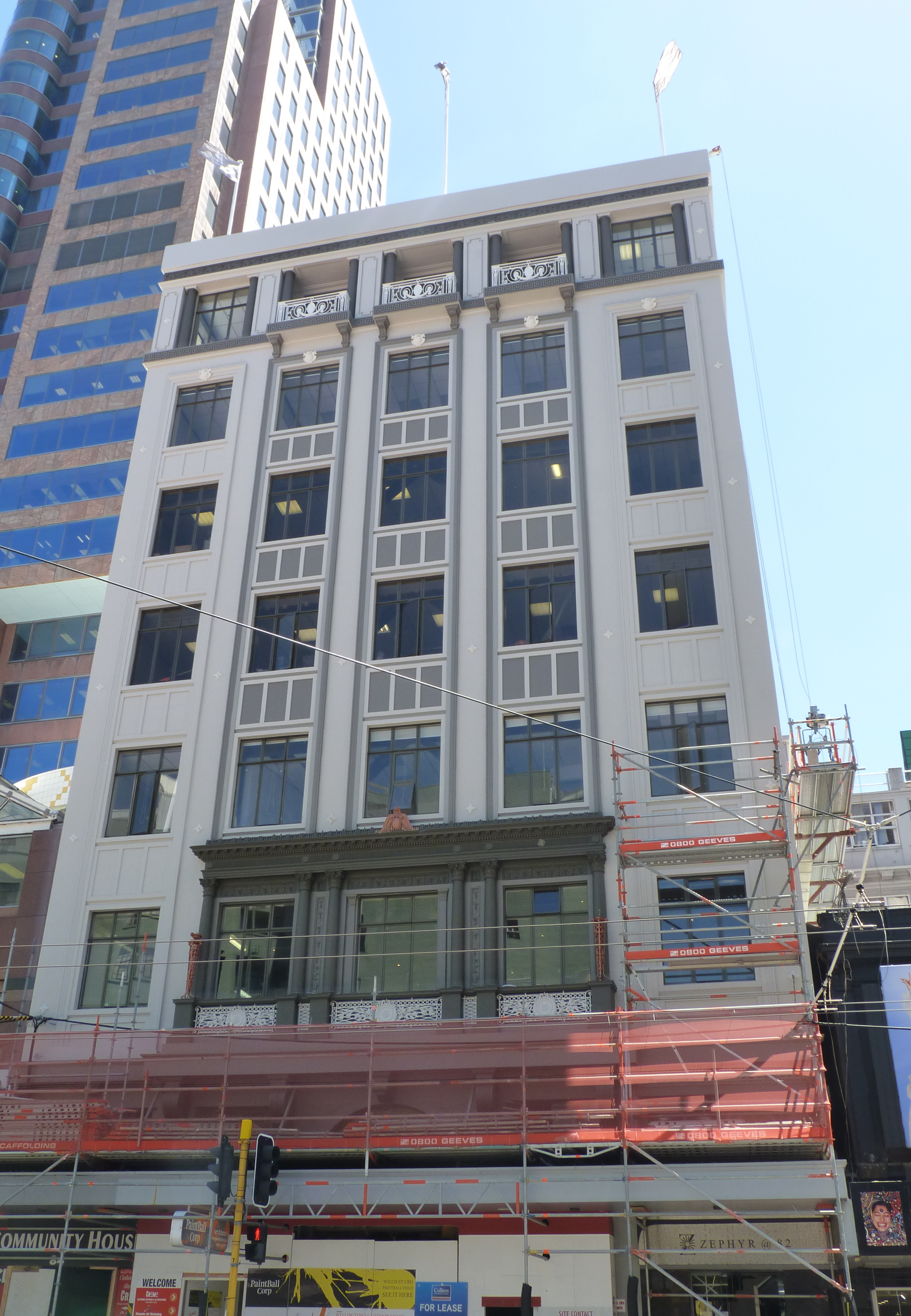
The former Evening Post Building, Wellington, designed by Fielding and completed in 1928.

Fielding trained as an architect under John Whitaker, and later became a junior partner with Manchester architect, John Dent Harker. Fielding is known to have worked on the St Annes-on-the-Sea Carnegie Library designed by Harker. Moving to New Zealand around 1908, Fielding established his own practice in Wellington in 1909, and designed nearly 300 buildings in the city and elsewhere. SIgnificant examples of his work include:

- Assembly Hall for the Vogeltown and Mornington Public Hall Society, Vennell Street, Brooklyn.
- Capitol Theatre, Miramar.
- Congregational Church, 45 Cambridge Terrace, Te Aro.
- Evening Post Building, 82 Willis Street, Te Aro.
- Flats for Mrs Turner-Cottier, 83 Kent Terrace, Te Aro.
- Kilbirnie Wesleyan Church, Waitoa Road, Hataitai.
- Lampard Flats, 284–286 Cuba Street, Te Aro.
- Plumbers Building, 122–124 Wakefield Street, Te Aro.
- Rosco Tearooms, 2–6 Coleman Place, Palmerston North.
- St Christopher's Church, 27 Ventnor Street, Seatoun.
- Ward Memorial Methodist Church and Hall, 69 Northland Road, Northland.
- Wellington Trades' Hall Building, 124–128 Vivian Street, Te Aro.

He also supervised the restoration of Antrim House in Wellington following a fire in 1940.

Fielding was admitted LRIBA in 1913, and elected a Fellow of the New Zealand Institute of Architects in 1915. He served as chairman of the Wellington branch of the New Zealand Institute of Architects.

== Lawn bowls ==
A member of the Hataitai Bowling Club, Fielding represented New Zealand at the 1930 British Empire Games in Hamilton, Ontario, and competed in the singles, pairs, and fours. He won the silver medal with his partner Peter McWhannell in the pairs event, and In the singles competition he won the bronze medal. The foursome of Fielding, McWhannell, Edward Leach, and Harold Frost finished fifth.

== Death ==
Fielding died on 26 July 1946, and his funeral was held at the Congregational Church in Cambridge Terrace, Wellington, which he had designed. He was buried at Karori Cemetery, Wellington.
