= Athletics at the 1930 British Empire Games – Men's hammer throw =

Men's hammer throw at the Commonwealth Games

The men's hammer throw event at the 1930 British Empire Games was held on 21 August at the Civic Stadium in Hamilton, Canada.

== Results ==
Rank	Name	Nationality	Result	Notes
1st place, gold medalist(s)	Malcolm Nokes	England	154 ft 7 in (47.12 m)	
2nd place, silver medalist(s)	Bill Britton	Ireland	153 ft 10 in (46.89 m)	
3rd place, bronze medalist(s)	John Cameron	Canada	145 ft 10 in (44.45 m)	
4	Sandy Smith	Scotland	145 ft 4 1/2 in (44.31 m)	
5	Archie Murray	Scotland	140 ft 1 in (42.70 m)	
6	Archie McDiarmid	Canada	139 ft 3 in (42.44 m)	
?	Charles Hermann	Canada	??.??	
?	George Sutherland	Canada	??.??	
?	Kenneth Pridie	England	??.??	
?	Johannes Viljoen	South Africa	??.??	
?	Harry Hart	South Africa	??.??	
