= James Thoms =

Personal information
- Nationality: South Africa
- Born: 12 February 1869 Kirkcaldy, Fife
- Died: Unknown

Sport
- Sport: Lawn bowls
Medal record
Men's Lawn bowls
Representing (South Africa)
British Empire Games
Silver medal – second place	1930 Hamilton	Singles

James Cockburn Thoms (1869 – ?), was a Scottish born, South African international lawn bowls player who competed in the 1930 British Empire Games and 1934 British Empire Games.

== Bowls career ==
At the 1930 British Empire Games he won the silver medal in the singles.

== Personal life ==
While in Scotland he resided at Edgemont Gardens, Langside, Glasgow.
