= Billy Rae =

Canadian international lawn bowls player

Personal information
- Nationality: Canada

Sport
- Sport: Lawn bowls
Medal record
Men's Lawn bowls
Representing (Canada)
British Empire Games
Silver medal – second place	1930 Hamilton	Rinks/Fours

William Rae was a Canadian international lawn bowls player who competed in the 1930 British Empire Games.

== Bowls career ==
At the 1930 British Empire Games he won the silver medal in the rinks (fours) event with Harry Allen, Jimmy Campbell and Mitch Thomas.
