= Tommy Hills =

English bowls player

Personal information
- Nationality: British (English)
- Born: January 22, 1884 Scotland
- Died: 1963 Woolwich, England
- Occupation: Auctioneer/Estate Agent

Sport
- Sport: Lawn bowls
- Club: Eltham BC
Medal record
Men's Lawn bowls
Representing England
British Empire Games
Gold medal – first place	1930 Hamilton	Pairs
Gold medal – first place	1934 London	Pairs

Thomas Curtis Hills (1884-1963), was an English bowls player who competed in three British Empire Games.

== Bowls career ==
At the 1930 British Empire Games he won the gold medal in the pairs event with George Wright.

The pair repeated the success four years later at the 1934 British Empire Games. He also represented England at the 1938 British Empire Games in Sydney, Australia, where he competed in the singles event, finishing in fourth place.

== Personal life ==
He was an auctioneer and estate agent by trade and married Beatrice Nellie Foster, they lived in Lewisham.
