= Wilt Moore =

Canadian bowls player

Personal information
- Nationality: Canada

Sport
- Sport: Lawn bowls
- Club: Vancouver
Medal record
Men's Lawn bowls
Representing (Canada)
British Empire Games
Bronze medal – third place	1930 Hamilton	Pairs

Wilt W Moore was a Canadian international lawn bowls player who competed in the 1930 British Empire Games.

== Bowls career ==
At the 1930 British Empire Games he won the bronze medal in the pairs event with his Vancouver teammate Arthur Reid.
