= James Frith (bowls) =

English bowls player

Personal information
- Nationality: British (English)
- Born: 16 November 1860 Chapel-en-le-Frith, Derbyshire
- Died: 18 November 1946 (aged 86) Newcastle upon Tyne
- Occupation: Life Assurance agent

Sport
- Sport: Lawn bowls
- Club: Belgrave BC
Medal record
Men's Lawn bowls
Representing England
British Empire Games
| Gold medal – first place | 1930 Hamilton | Fours |

James Frith (1860-1946) was an English bowls player who competed in the 1930 British Empire Games.

== Bowls career ==
At the 1930 British Empire Games he won the gold medal in the rinks (fours) event with Ernie Gudgeon, Albert Hough and James Edney.

He was a 1921 rinks (fours) national champion bowling for the Belgrave Bowls Club, Northumberland.

== Personal life ==
He was an Life Assurance agent by trade and lived in Newcastle upon Tyne.
