= Tommy Holt =

Scottish boxer

Personal information
- Nationality: British (Scottish)
- Born: C.1910

Sport
- Sport: Boxing
- Event: Bantamweight
- Club: Dalmarnock BC
Medal record
Boxing
Representing Scotland
British Empire Games
Bronze medal – third place	1930 Hamilton	bantamweight

Thomas Holt (c.1910 – date of death unknown) was a boxer who competed for Scotland and won a bronze medal at the British Empire Games.

== Biography ==
Holt was best known for representing Scotland at the 1930 British Empire Games, where he won the bronze medal in the bantamweight division at the 1930 British Empire Games in Hamilton, losing to eventual gold medallist Harry Mizler in the semi-final. At the time of the Games he was a slaterer (slate roofs) by trade and living in Calross Street, Glasgow.

He was the Scottish amateur champion and turned professional soon after the Games. As a professional boxer, he was active between 1930 and 1935.
