= James Edney =

English bowls player

Personal information
- Nationality: British (English)
- Born: 26 June 1870 Dibden, England
- Died: 1951 (aged 80–81) Southampton, England
- Occupation: Wholesale Grocer

Sport
- Sport: Lawn bowls
- Club: Atherley BC, Southampton
Medal record
Men's Lawn bowls
Representing England
British Empire Games
| Gold medal – first place | 1930 Hamilton | Fours |

James Edney (1870-1951), was an English bowls player who competed in the 1930 British Empire Games.

== Bowls career ==
At the 1930 British Empire Games he won the gold medal in the rinks (fours) event with Ernie Gudgeon, James Frith and Albert Hough.

He was the 1932 fours (rinks) National Champion bowling for Atherley BC, Southampton.

== Personal life ==
He was a wholesale grocer by trade and lived in Southampton. He married Edith Catherine Edis, who accompanied him to Hamilton in 1930.
