= Albert Hough =

English bowls player

Personal information
- Nationality: British (English)
- Born: 1877 Sheffield, England
- Died: 1960 (aged 82–83) Northumberland, England
- Occupation: Law Accountant

Sport
- Sport: Lawn bowls
- Club: Gosforth BC
Medal record
Men's Lawn bowls
Representing England
British Empire Games
Gold medal – first place	1930 Hamilton	Fours

Albert Percy Hough (1877–1960), was an English bowls player who competed in the 1930 British Empire Games.

== Bowls career ==
At the 1930 British Empire Games he won the gold medal in the rinks (fours) event with Ernie Gudgeon, James Frith and James Edney.

== Personal life ==
He was a law accountant by trade and lived in Newcastle upon Tyne. He married Florence Selina Shepherd.
