= James Rolland (boxer) =

Scottish boxer

Personal information
- Nationality: British (Scottish)
- Born: c.1908
- Years active: 1927–1934

Sport
- Sport: Boxing
- Event: Flyweight/Lightweight
- Club: Leith Victoria A.A.C.
Medal record
Boxing
Representing Scotland
British Empire Games
Gold medal – first place	1930 Hamilton	lightweight

James Rolland (c.1908 – date of death unknown) was a boxer who competed for Scotland, who won a gold medal at the British Empire Games.

== Biography ==
Rolland from Leith in Scotland, boxed out of the Leith Victoria A.A.C., making his debut on 19 March 1927 and competing until 11 August 1934. He had a record of 20 wins and four losses.

In 1927 boxing at flyweight, he won the A.B.A. title, in addition to winning the Scottish flyweight title. After stepping up in weight, he won the 1930 Scottish lightweight title.

He was best known for representing Scotland at the 1930 British Empire Games, where he won the gold medal in the lightweight division at the 1930 British Empire Games in Hamilton, defeating Cosmo Canzano of Canada in the final. At the time of the Games he was living in Baltic Street, Leith and working as a plumber.

Rolland won the European Police Lightweight Championship title in Berlin after moving to Nottingham, where he joined police force. In 1934, he won a second ABA title, this time at lightweight.
