= The Kings Are Here =

Studio album by The Kings
- Released: 1980
- Studio: Nimbus 9 "Soundstage", Toronto
- Genre: Rock
- Length: 30:42
- Label: Elektra; WEA Canada
- Producer: Bob Ezrin

The Kings chronology
The Kings Are Here (1980)	Amazon Beach (1981)

Singles from The Kings Are Here
- 1. "Switchin' to Glide" Released: 1980; 2. "This Beat Goes On" / "Switchin' to Glide" Released: 1980; 3. "Don't Let Me Know" Released: 1980

Professional ratings
Review scores
Source	Rating
AllMusic	4/5 stars

The Kings Are Here is the debut Canadian album by the Kings, released in 1980 and certified Platinum in 2021. Its first two tracks, "This Beat Goes On" and "Switchin' to Glide", are usually played together and reached number 59 on the RPM singles chart in Canada.

The album was reissued on CD for the first time in 1999 with five bonus tracks as The Kings Are Here and More.

== Background ==
The Kings Are Here was produced by Bob Ezrin, who had just completed working on Pink Floyd's The Wall. Taking some time off, Ezrin was back home in Toronto and stopped by the Soundstage studio, where he had worked with Alice Cooper and others. There he encountered the Kings recording a self-funded album and, liking what he heard, agreed to mix the tracks "This Beat Goes On" and "Switchin' to Glide". However, realizing that he was not satisfied with the recordings, Ezrin took the tapes to Elektra Records in Los Angeles and secured the band a deal with the label. Ezrin then made the Kings re-rehearse and re-arrange the songs for a month before they re-recorded the album, with some songs having been re-written.

The album went Gold in Canada and peaked at number 74 on Billboard's Top 200 in October 1980, spending 26 weeks on the chart. The single "Switchin' to Glide"/"This Beat Goes On" reached number 43 on Billboard's Hot 100.

The Kings released one more album on Elektra, the Ezrin produced and less successful Amazon Beach (number 170), before signing with Capitol Canada for the R.S.V.P. EP in 1982.

== Track listing ==
All tracks are written by David Diamond and Aryan Zero, except where noted.

No.	Title	Writer(s)	Length
1.	"This Beat Goes On"		3:08
2.	"Switchin' to Glide"		2:32
3.	"It's Okay"		2:53
4.	"Go Away"		3:45
5.	"Partyitis"		3:49
6.	"Run Shoes Running"		2:32
7.	"Anti Hero Man"		3:25
8.	"Love Store"		3:28
9.	"Don't Let Me Know"		3:58
10.	"My Habit"	Diamond, Zero, Bill Lanza	3:40
Total length:			30:42

1999 bonus tracks
No.	Title	Writer(s)	Length
11.	"Right to the Top" (new track)		3:30
12.	"If the Stars Come Out Tonight" (new track)		4:20
13.	"Unstoppable" (from Unstoppable, 1993)		3:51
14.	"Shoulda Been Me" (from Unstoppable)		3:07
15.	"If We Don't Belong Together" (originally from Unstoppable; reworked and remixed)	Sonny Keyes, Zero	4:36

== Personnel ==
The Kings

- David Diamond – vocals, bass
- Mister Zero – guitar
- Sonny Keyes – keyboards, vocals
- Max Styles – drums

Technical

- Bob Ezrin – producer
- Michael McCarty – associate producer, engineer
- Robert Hrycyna – associate producer, engineer
- Ben Rogers – engineer
- John Rosenthal – engineer
- Rick Hart – engineer
- Doug Sax – mastering
- Hugh Syme – design, art direction
- Deborah Samuel – photography
