= Robert Colquhoun (bowls) =

English bowls player

Personal information
- Nationality: British (English)
- Born: 15 November 1882 Rochester, Kent
- Died: 28 June 1970 (aged 87) Bromley, Greater London
- Occupation: Coal Merchant

Sport
- Sport: Lawn bowls
- Club: Bromley BC (outdoors); Crystal Palace (indoors)
Medal record
Men's Lawn bowls
Representing England
British Empire Games
Gold medal – first place	1930 Hamilton	Singles

Robert George Colquhoun (1882-1970), was an English bowls player who competed in the 1930 British Empire Games.

== Bowls career ==
He was the champion of Bromley, Kent and England in 1929 and was an English international from 1929 to 1933.

At the 1930 British Empire Games he won the gold medal in the singles event.

He was the 1929 singles National Champion.

== Personal life ==
He was a retired Army Officer and coal merchant by trade. He married Nellie Maud Sands, who joined him in Canada during the Games.
