= Sandy Smith (hammer thrower) =

Scottish athlete (1885–??)

Personal information
- Nationality: British (Scottish)
- Born: c.1885

Sport
- Sport: Athletics
- Event(s): Hammer throw, shot put, discus throw
- Club: Glasgow Police AC

Alexander Smith (1885 – date of death unknown) was a track and field athlete from Scotland who competed at the 1930 British Empire Games (now Commonwealth Games).

== Biography ==
Smith was a sergeant with the Glasgow Police and was a member of their athletics club when he won the 1929 Scottish AAA Championship hammer throw and weight (shot put) titles.

Smith throwing for the Glasgow Police AC, retained the hammer and weight titles at the 1930 Scottish AAA Championships.

Leaving Scotland on the Anchor-Donaldson liner Audania, he arrived in Canada and represented the Scottish Empire Games team at the 1930 British Empire Games in Hamilton, Ontario, Canada, participating in one event, the hammer throw. At the time of the Games, he was 45 years old, living at 1286 Springburn Road in Glasgow.

In 1932 nearing the age of 50, he was still competing at the highest level and was with the St Rollox Police Division. At the 1934 Scottish AAA Championships he won both the hammer and discus titles.

Smith was a four-times British hammer thow champion by virtue of being the highest placed British athlete at the AAA Championships in 1933, 1934, 1936 and 1937.
