= James Gage =

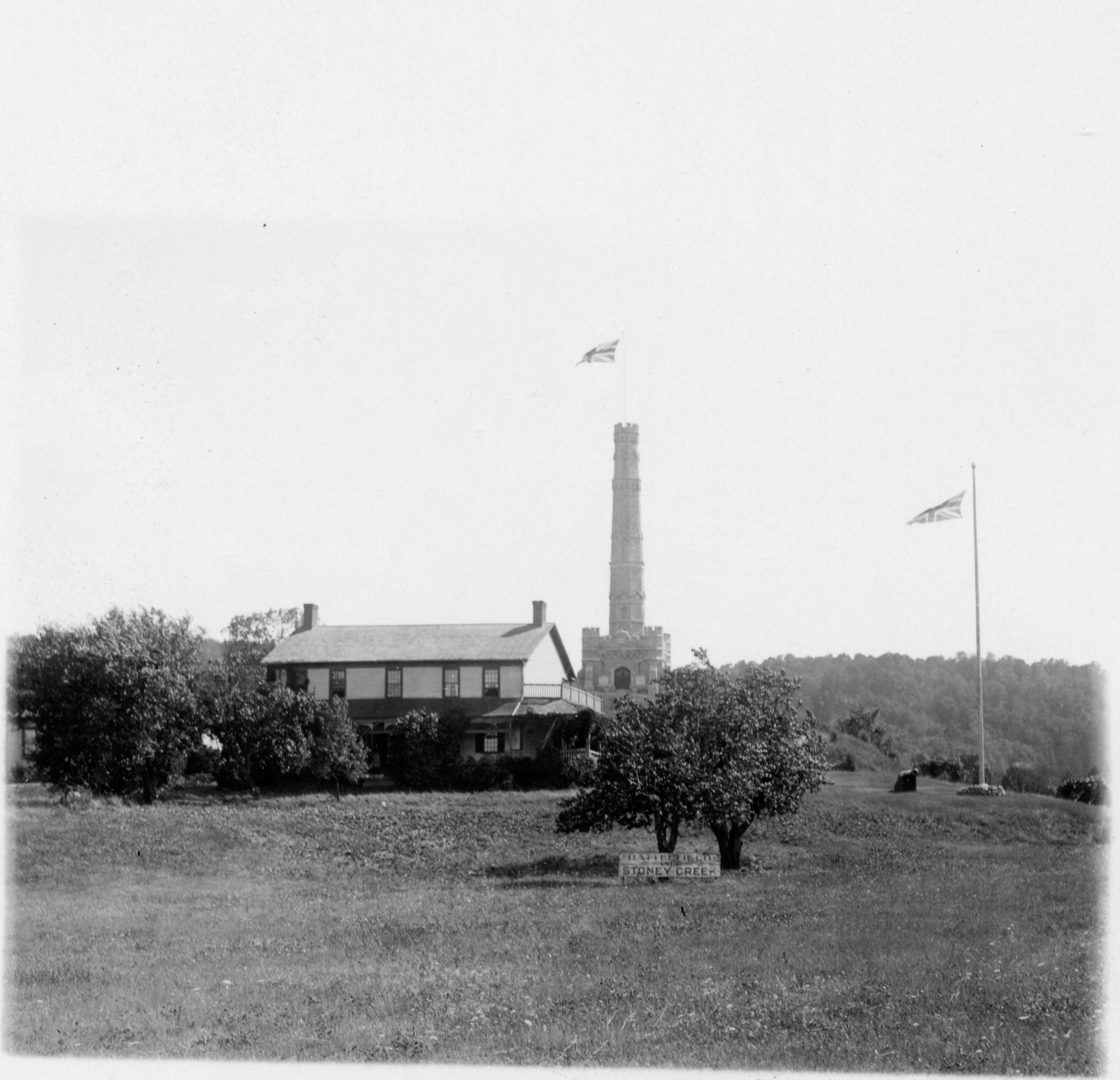
Overlooking the James Gage farmhouse with the Battlefield Monument in the background, Stoney Creek, Ontario, [ca. 1930]

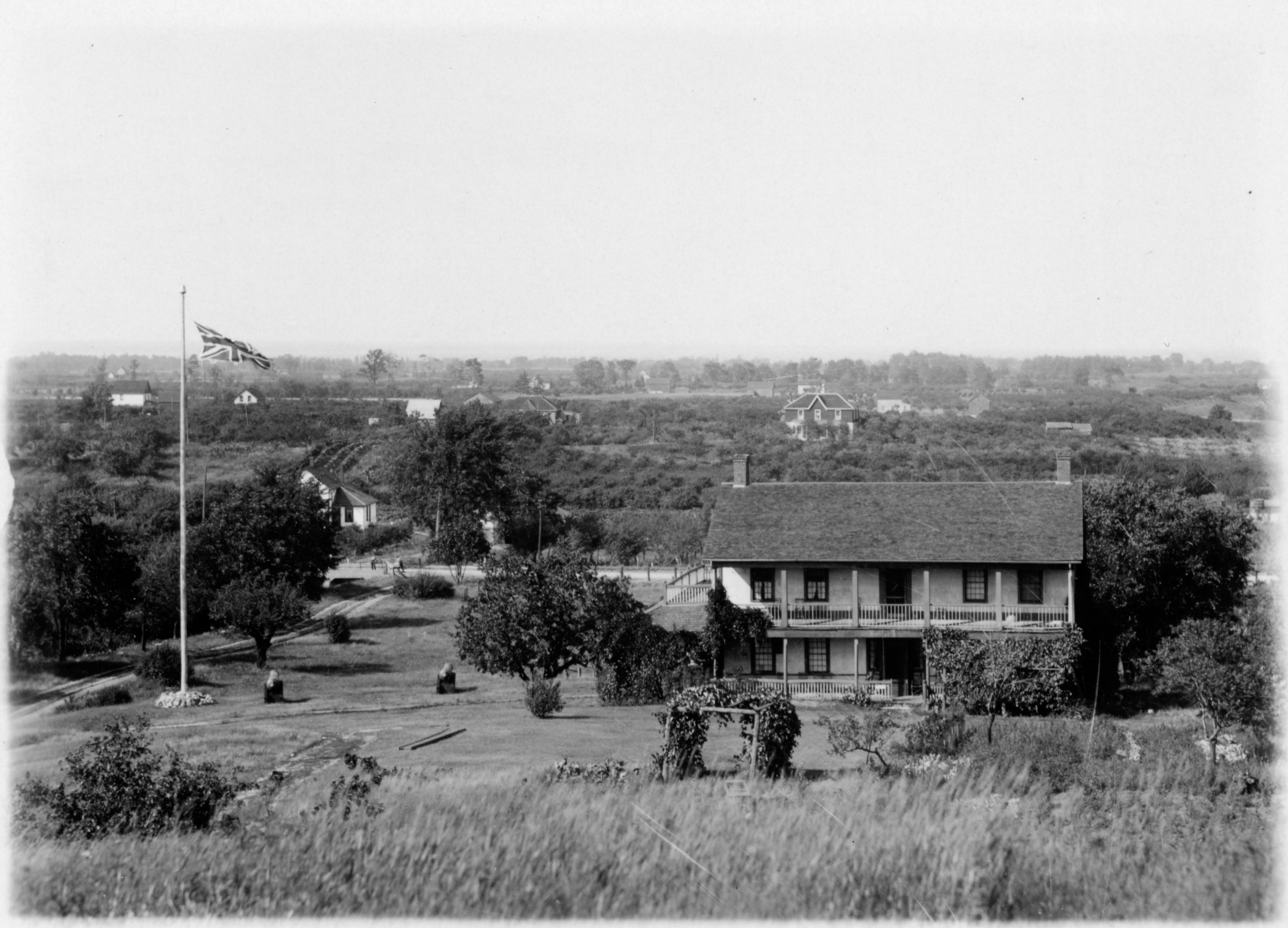
Overlooking the James Gage farmhouse, [ca. 1930]

James Gage (25 June 1774 – 15 February 1854) was born in Greenbush, New York. His father, also James Gage, served as a private in the New York militia during the Revolutionary War, and was killed fighting the British in 1777. His mother, Mary, moved with the family to Stoney Creek in 1790 and began farming.

Gage married in 1796 and eventually took over the family's farm. He served in the 5th Regiment of Lincoln Militia during the War of 1812. His farm was the site of a major British victory at the Battle of Stoney Creek. Wounded British soldiers were treated inside his and his uncle William's homes, and they were later awarded compensation for it by the government.

After the war, he opened a general store and became known as a successful merchant and miller. In 1854, Gage died in Hamilton, Ontario and was buried in Hamilton Cemetery.

== Tribute ==
Gage's farmland (along with his uncle's) was later sold by lawyer Robert Russel Gage, a direct descendant of James' uncle. Today, the property serves as the Battlefield House museum and park. Gage Avenue and Upper Gage Avenue in the city of Hamilton, Ontario are named simply because the avenue below the mountain brow is located along the western border of the park.
