= Boxing at the 1930 British Empire Games =

- Venue: Barton Street Arena
- Location: Hamilton, Ontario, Canada
- Dates: 16 – 23 August 1930

At the 1930 British Empire Games, the boxing competition was held in Hamilton, Ontario, Canada, and featured contests in eight weight classes.

The boxing and wrestling events were held at the Barton Street Arena. England claimed five of the eight gold medals.

== Medal table ==
* Host nation (Canada)

Medals won by nation with totals, ranked by number of golds—sortable
Rank	Nation	Gold	Silver	Bronze	Total
1	England (ENG)	5	1	2	8
2	South Africa (SAF)	2	1	2	5
3	Scotland (SCO)	1	0	2	3
4	Canada (CAN)*	0	5	1	6
5	Australia (AUS)	0	1	0	1
Totals (5 entries)		8	8	7	23

== Medal summary ==
Event	Gold	Silver	Bronze
Flyweight 51kg	Jacob Smith (SAF)	Thomas Pardoe (ENG)	Ross Galloway (CAN)
Bantamweight 54kg	Harry Mizler (ENG)	John Keller (CAN)	Tommy Holt (SCO)*
Featherweight 57kg	Freddie Meachem (ENG)	Lawrence Stevens (SAF)	Alex Lyons (SCO)
Lightweight 60kg	James Rolland (SCO)	Cosmo Canzano (CAN)	Albert Love (ENG)
Welterweight 67kg	Leonard Hall (SAF)	Howard Williams (CAN)	Frank Brooman (ENG)
Middleweight 75kg	Fred Mallin (ENG)	Dudley Gallagher (AUS)	Ernest Peirce (SAF)
Light heavyweight 81kg	Joe Goyder (ENG)	Al Pitcher (CAN)	Joey Basson (SAF)
Heavyweight 91kg	Anthony Stuart (ENG)	William Skimming (CAN)	Only two entrants

(*) Tommy Holt received a bronze medal and not a silver medal as stated on some websites, the bantamweight final was between Harry Mizler of England and John Keller of Canada.

== Results ==
Flyweight

- semi final - Pardoe bt Galloway on points
- Final - Smith bt Pardoe on points

Bantamweight

- semi final - Mizler bt Holt (stopped in 2nd round)
- Final - Mizler bt Keller on points

Featherweight

- 2nd Rd - Meacham bt Paul Mecteau (Canada) on points
- semi final - Meacham bt Lyons on points
- semi final - Stevens bt Lafosse (Newfoundland) on points
- Final - Meacham by Stevens on points

=== Lightweight ===
- semi final - Rowland bt Love on points
- Final - Rowland bt Canzano on points

Welterweight

- semi final - Hall bt Brooman on points
- Final - Hall bt Williams on points

Middleweight

- semi final - Mallin bt E Phillips (Canada) on points
- semi final - Gallagher bt Peirce on split decision 2-1
- Final - Mallin bt Gallagher on points

Light heavyweight

- semi final - Goyder bt Basson on points
- Final - Goyder bt Pitcher on points

Heavyweight

- Final - Signaller Stuart bt Skimming (skimming retired after round 2)
