= Peter McWhannell =

New Zealand lawn bowler (1875–1943)

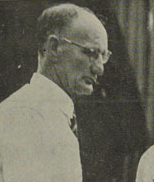
- McWhannell in 1940

Personal information
- Born: 3 March 1875 Coatbridge, Lanarkshire, Scotland
- Died: 26 July 1943 (aged 68) Wellington, New Zealand
- Occupation: Engineer
- Spouse: Mary Cook McCole Love (m. 1905)

Sport
- Country: New Zealand
- Sport: Lawn bowls
- Club: Hataitai
Medal record
Men's lawn bowls
Representing New Zealand
British Empire Games
Silver medal – second place	1930 Hamilton	Pairs

Peter McWhannell (3 March 1875 – 26 July 1943) was a New Zealand lawn bowls player who competed for his country at the 1930 British Empire Games, winning a silver medal in the pairs competition.

== Early life and family ==
Born in Coatbridge, Lanarkshire, Scotland, in 1875, McWhannell served his engineering apprenticeship on the Clyde. He emigrated to New Zealand in the early 1900s, initially settling in Dunedin before moving to Wellington. In 1905 he married Mary Cook McCole Love, and the couple went on to have two children.

McWhannell was foreman at Robertson's foundry in Wellington, and subsequently established his own engineering firm of Ross, Jory, and McWhannell.

== Lawn bowls ==
Initially a member of the Newtown Bowling Club, McWhannell moved to the Hataitai Bowling Club when it was established in 1910, and served as that club's president in 1918. He skipped Hataitai teams to five titles at Wellington tournaments, and won numerous club championships. He was the Hataitai singles champion in 1912, 1917, 1920 and 1935; pairs champion in 1916, 1924, 1927 and 1937; and fours champion in 1918, 1929, 1935, 1938 and 1939.

At the 1930 British Empire Games in Hamilton, Ontario, he competed in the pairs and fours. He won the silver medal with his partner William Fielding in the pairs event. The foursome of McWhannell, Fielding, Edward Leach, and Harold Frost finished in fifth place in the fours competition.

Not long before his death, McWhannell was elected a life member of the Hataitai Bowling Club.

== Death ==
McWhannell died at his home in the Wellington suburb of Hataitai on 26 July 1943, and his ashes were buried at Karori Cemetery. His wife, Mary McWhannell, died in 1961.
