= Edward Leach (bowls) =

Personal information
- Born: 4 December 1879 Walsall, Staffordshire, England
- Died: 30 October 1949 (aged 69) Auckland, New Zealand
- Occupation: Baker

Sport
- Country: New Zealand
- Sport: Lawn bowls
- Club: Stratford

Edward Leach (4 December 1879 – 30 October 1949) was a New Zealand bowls player who represented his country at the 1930 British Empire Games.

Born in Walsall, Staffordshire, England, on 4 December 1879, Leach was the son of John and Ann Leach. He became a baker and later emigrated to New Zealand.

A member of the Stratford Bowling Club, Leach represented New Zealand in the fours at the 1930 British Empire Games in Hamilton, Ontario. The foursome of Leach, William Fielding, Peter McWhannell, and Harold Frost finished fifth.

Leach later moved to Auckland, where he became president of the Saint Heliers Bowling Club. He served as vice president of the Tamaki Returned Servicemen's Association and president of the Tamaki Orphans' Club.

Leach died on 30 October 1949, and he was buried at Purewa Cemetery, Auckland.
