= Freddie Meachem =

English boxer (1907–1973)

Personal information
- Nationality: British (English)
- Born: 22 April 1907 Southwark, England
- Died: 1973 Kent, England
- Weight: Featherweight

Boxing career
Medal record
Men's Boxing
Representing England
British Empire Games
| Gold medal – first place | 1930 Hamilton | Lightweight |

Frank Richard Meachem (1907–1973) was an English boxer. He fought as Freddie Meachem.

== Biography ==
He competed in the featherweight class at the 1930 British Empire Games for the 1930 English team, where he won a gold medal. He was a civil servant at the time of the 1930 Games.

He was three times England's Amateur Boxing Association Senior Champion in 1928 and 1929 representing Civil Service ABC at featherweight and also the 1932 lightweight champion.
