= Archie Murray =

Scottish athlete (1902–??)

Personal information
- Nationality: British (Scottish)
- Born: c.1902

Sport
- Sport: Athletics
- Event(s): Hammer throw, Shot put
- Club: Field Events Club, Edinburgh

Archibald Moir Murray (1902 – date of death unknown) was a track and field athlete from Scotland who competed at the 1930 British Empire Games (now Commonwealth Games).

== Biography ==
Murray specialised in both the hammer throw and putting the weight and was a member of the Field Events Club in Edinburgh. He was the 1928 Scottish hammer throw champion.

Leaving Scotland on the Anchor-Donaldson liner Audania, he arrived in Canada and represented the Scottish Empire Games team at the 1930 British Empire Games in Hamilton, Ontario, Canada, participating in one event, the hammer throw. At the time of the Games he was 28 years old and was living at 20 Warriston Crescent in Edinburgh and was a teacher by profession.

In 1933 he won both the hammer throw and putting the weight against the Atalanta Club (the combined Scottish Universities team).
