= Harold Frost (bowls) =

New Zealand bowls player

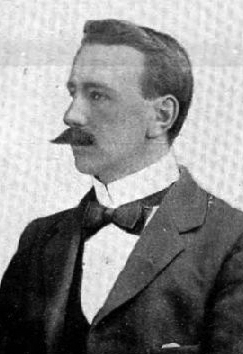

Personal information
- Full name: Harold William Frost
- Born: 1874; Birkenhead, Cheshire, England
- Died: 5 September 1950 (aged 76); Auckland, New Zealand
- Occupation: Dentist
- Spouse: Florence Gruchy (m. 1898)

Sport
- Country: New Zealand
- Sport: Lawn bowls
- Club: Carlton

Harold William Frost (1874 – 5 September 1950) was a New Zealand bowls player who represented his country at the 1930 British Empire Games.

== Early life and family ==
Born in 1874 at Birkenhead, Cheshire, England, Frost emigrated to New Zealand with his family when he was seven years old. He studied at the University of Otago and the University of Pennsylvania, becoming a dentist. He began practising in Napier, where he married Florence Gruchy at Napier Cathedral on 9 June 1898. The couple went on to have four children. Frost lived in Wellington for about 20 years, before moving to Auckland in about 1928.

== Lawn bowls ==
A member of the Carlton Bowling Club, Frost represented New Zealand at the 1930 British Empire Games in Hamilton, Ontario, in the fours. The foursome of Frost, William Fielding, Peter McWhannell and Edward Leach finished fifth.

== Death ==
Frost died in Auckland on 5 September 1950.
