= John Orr (bowls, born 1870) =

Scottish lawn bowls player

Personal information
- Nationality: British (Scottish)
- Born: 1870
- Occupation: Doctor

Sport
- Sport: Lawn bowls
- Club: Whitehouse and Grange BC
Medal record
Men's Lawn bowls
Representing Scotland
British Empire Games
Bronze medal – third place	1930 Hamilton	Fours

John Orr (1870-date of death unknown), was a Scottish international lawn bowls player who competed in the 1930 British Empire Games.

== Bowls career ==
Orr was a member of the Whitehouse and Grange Bowls Club of Edinburgh.

At the 1930 British Empire Games he won the bronze medal in the rinks (fours) event with David Fraser, William Campbell and Canadian Tom Chambers who joined the team following the death of original team member John Kennedy.

== Personal life ==
He was a doctor by trade and lived in Park Terrace, Edinburgh.
