= William Campbell (bowls) =

Scottish lawn bowler

Personal information
- Nationality: British (Scottish)
- Born: 1878
- Died: July 1939 (aged 60) Stirling, Scotland
- Occupation: Commission Agent

Sport
- Sport: Lawn bowls
- Club: Stirling BC
Medal record
Men's Lawn bowls
Representing Scotland
British Empire Games
Bronze medal – third place	1930 Hamilton	Fours

William Campbell (1878 – July 1939) was a Scottish international lawn bowls player who competed in the 1930 British Empire Games.

== Bowls career ==
Campbell was a member of the Stirling Bowls Club.

At the 1930 British Empire Games he won the bronze medal in the rinks (fours) event with David Fraser, John Orr and Canadian Tom Chambers who joined the team following the death of original team member John Kennedy.

He died at his home at 27 Millar Place in Stirling during July 1939.

== Personal life ==
He was a Commission Agent by trade and lived in Miller Place, Stirling.
