= David Fraser (bowls) =

Scottish lawn bowler

Personal information
- Nationality: British (Scottish)
- Born: 1878
- Died: Unknown

Sport
- Sport: Lawn bowls
- Club: St Andrews BC, Fife
Medal record
Men's Lawn bowls
Representing Scotland
British Empire Games
Bronze medal – third place	1930 Hamilton	Fours

David Fraser (1878–?), was a Scottish international lawn bowls player who competed in the 1930 British Empire Games.

== Bowls career ==
Fraser was a member of the St Andrews Bowls Club of Fife.

At the 1930 British Empire Games he won the bronze medal in the rinks (fours) event with John Orr, William Campbell and Canadian Tom Chambers who joined the team following the death of original team member John Kennedy.

== Personal life ==
He lived in St Andrews, Fife.
