= Festival of Friends =

Music festival in Ontario

The Festival of Friends
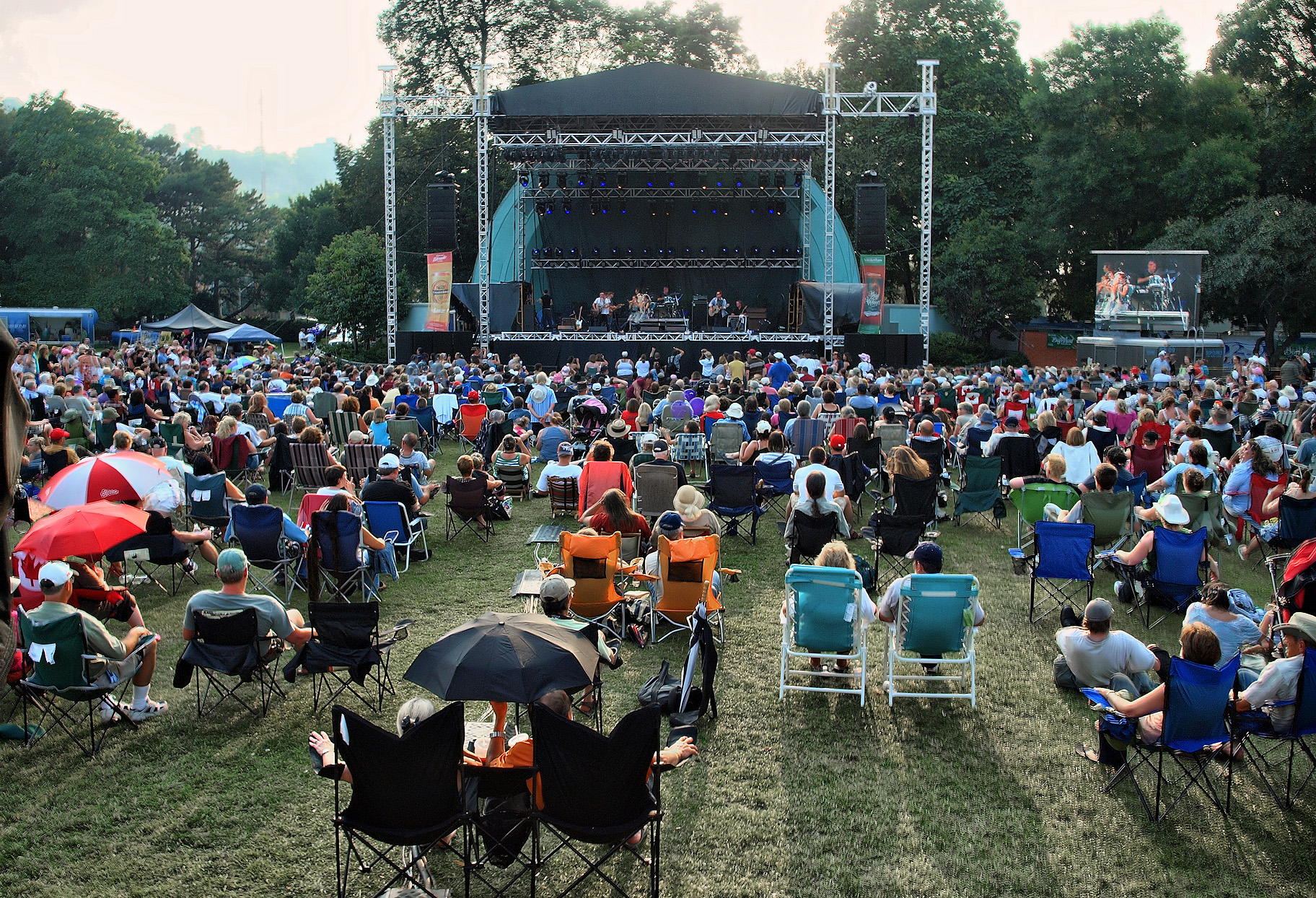
- A seated audience at The Festival of Friends
- Genre: Music Festival
- Dates: First Weekend in August
- Locations: Hamilton, Ontario, Canada
- Years active: 1976–present
- Attendance: 200,000 (2013)
- Website: Official website

The Festival of Friends is an annual three-day free summer music festival held in Gage Park in Hamilton, Ontario, on the first weekend in August.

== History ==
=== 1976 ===
Festival of Friends was started in 1976 by artist Bill Powell Jr. as an independent folk festival in Hamilton's Gage Park. Performers at the inaugural festival included Willie P. Bennett, Ray Materick, Brent Titcomb, Shirley Eikhard, Marc Jordan, Noel Harrison, Sylvia Tyson, Stan Rogers, The Good Brothers, Jesse Winchester, Ian Tamblyn, Beverly Glenn-Copeland, Raffi, Ben Mink, Billie Hughes, Jackie Washington and Colleen Peterson. In its first year, the Festival also partnered with the neighbouring Delta Theatre, which hosted free screenings of Canadian films, as well as marathon concerts that ran from midnight until daybreak. The three-day festival was captured in a documentary film.

=== 1977–2010 ===
Over the next 35 years, the festival continued annually in Gage Park, and evolved into a showcase for arts and music featuring musicians, crafters, and food from across the globe. Over the years Canadian singer-songwriters such as Bruce Cockburn, Ken Whiteley, Burton Cummings, Scott Merritt, Valdy, Bob Snider, Tom Wilson, Randy Bachman, Fred Eaglesmith, Jane Siberry, Ron Sexsmith and Gord Downie appeared in the bandshell.

In 2007, the festival's sole focus on Canadian musicians was eased and international musical acts were added to the line-ups, such as Don McLean, Canned Heat, John Sebastian, Leon Redbone, Eric Burdon, Dr. John, Steve Earle, Richie Havens and Buckwheat Zydeco.

After 25 years as director, Powell retired in 2000. Doug MacArthur and Powell's wife Lynne directed the event until Loren Lieberman became its director in 2002, serving until his retirement in late 2016.

=== 2011–2016 ===
In January 2011, the Festival of Friends announced that it would be moving from its historic home in Gage Park to the Ancaster Fairgrounds. At the time, Lieberman and city councillor Bernie Morelli stated that the festival had simply outgrown the park. The exodus from Gage Park was sharply criticized by founder Powell, as well as a chorus of the festival's regular local musicians. The first year at the new location was marred by parking headaches and traffic gridlock, and the 2012 festival was hit with three days of heavy rain, but Lieberman insisted there were no plans to move the festival back to Gage Park as this would force a substantial reduction in size. "The location was no longer working, but the music still is," he remarked in 2015.

=== 2017–Present ===
In October 2016, organizers announced that the festival would move back to Gage Park starting in 2017. In a statement, organizers explained that "the Festival of Friends was forced to move to Ancaster for a myriad of reasons – including unresponsive leadership at city hall, as well as issues of access in Gage Park. In the past few months, changes at city hall have made it possible for the Festival of Friends to negotiate solutions to many of the concerns that necessitated our exit."

Many festival-goers welcomed the return and felt the Ancaster location was too out-of-the way. For his part, Lieberman admitted that Ancaster was "never where the festival was supposed to be." Lieberman quit as festival director in 2016, with longtime board member Robert Rakoczy taking over the reins as General Manager in 2017. Due to the coronavirus the festival was cancelled in 2020.

== The event ==
The Festival of Friends weekend includes 25–30 musical acts on two stages. A main stage runs until 11:00pm daily. A second stage runs 12:00pm – 6:00pm Saturday & Sunday.

The event also features craft and food vendors, a beer garden, midway rides, a haunted house, an escape room and pony rides.

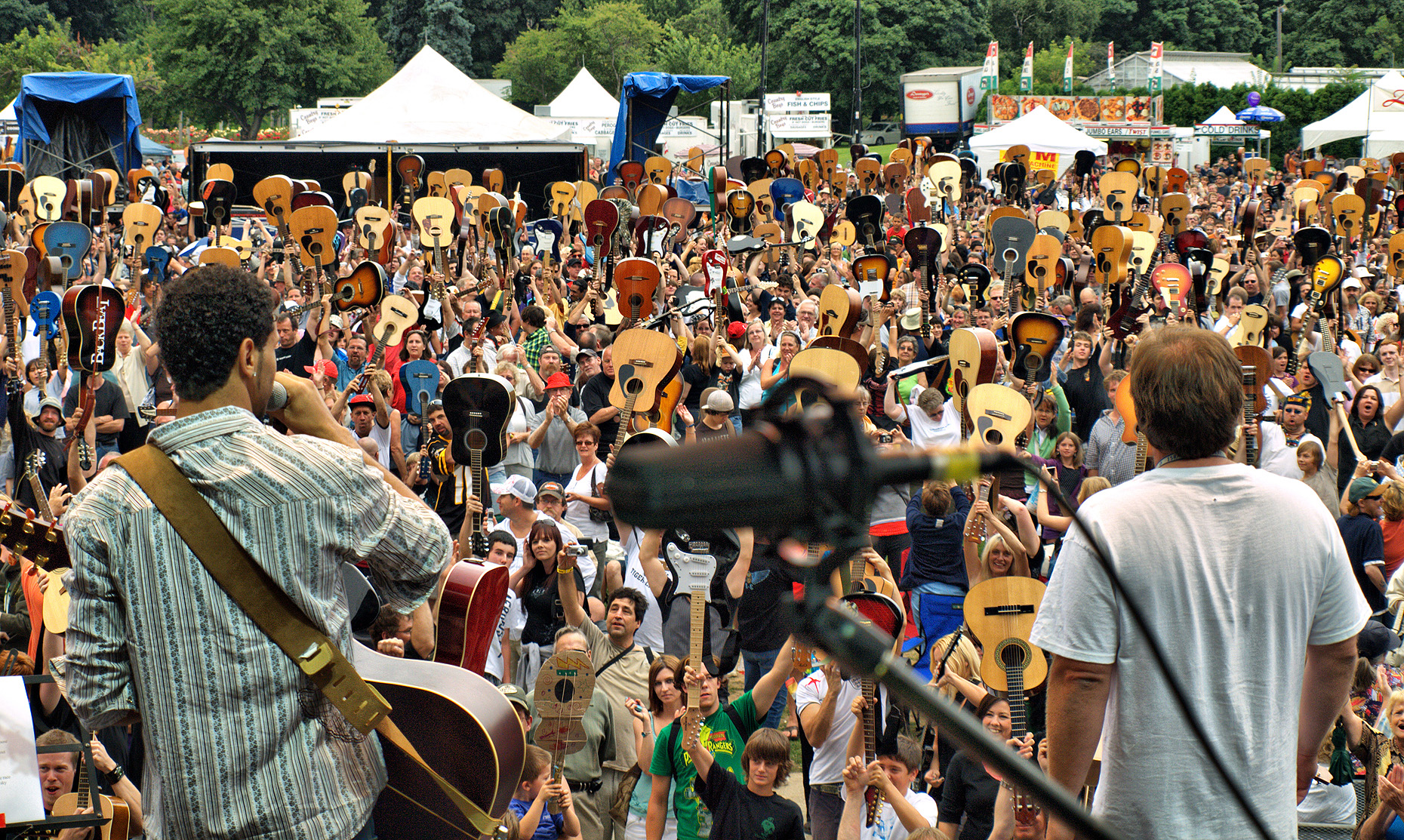
Guinness World Records Attempt at Festival of Friends

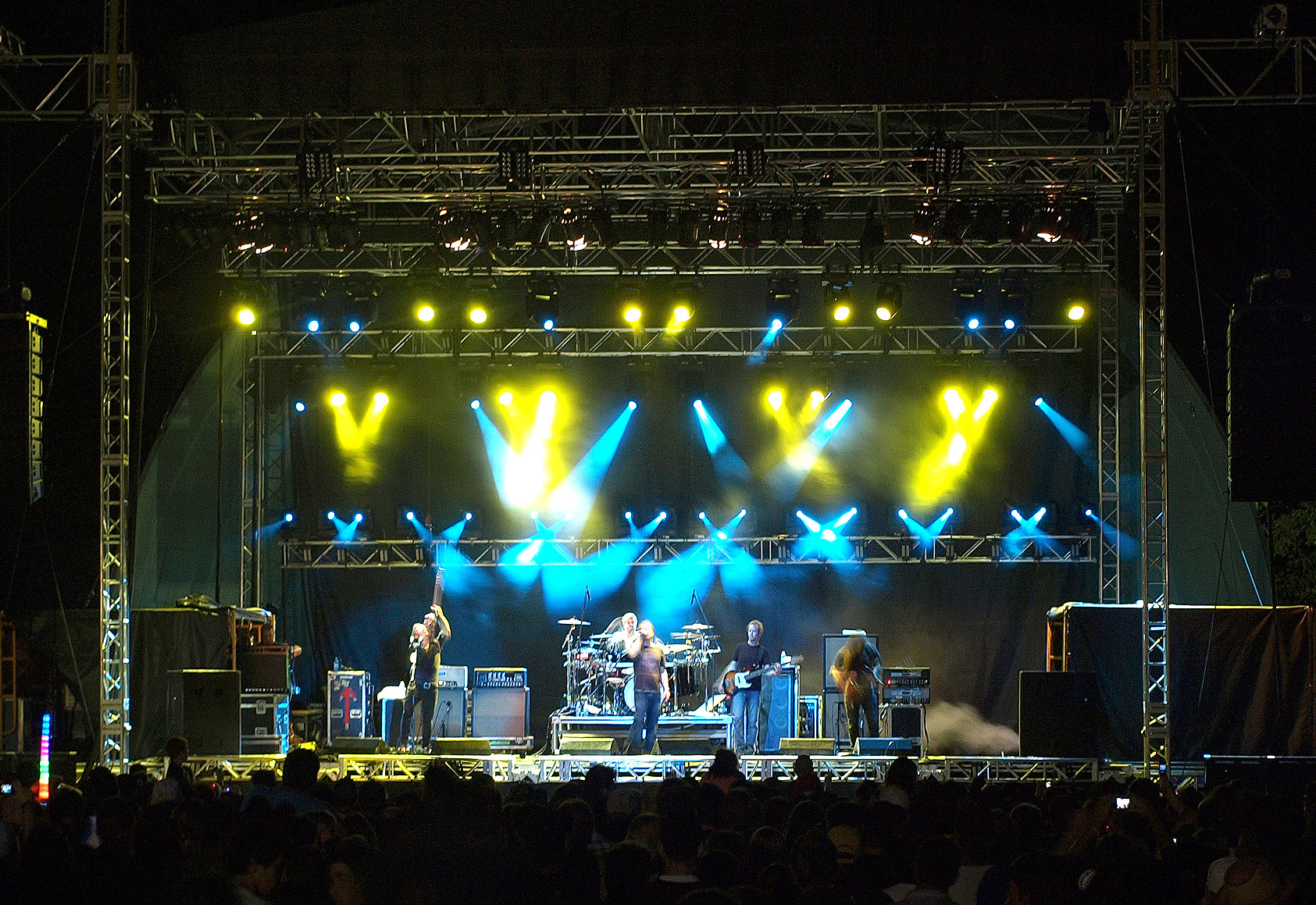
The Festival of Friends Mainstage at Night

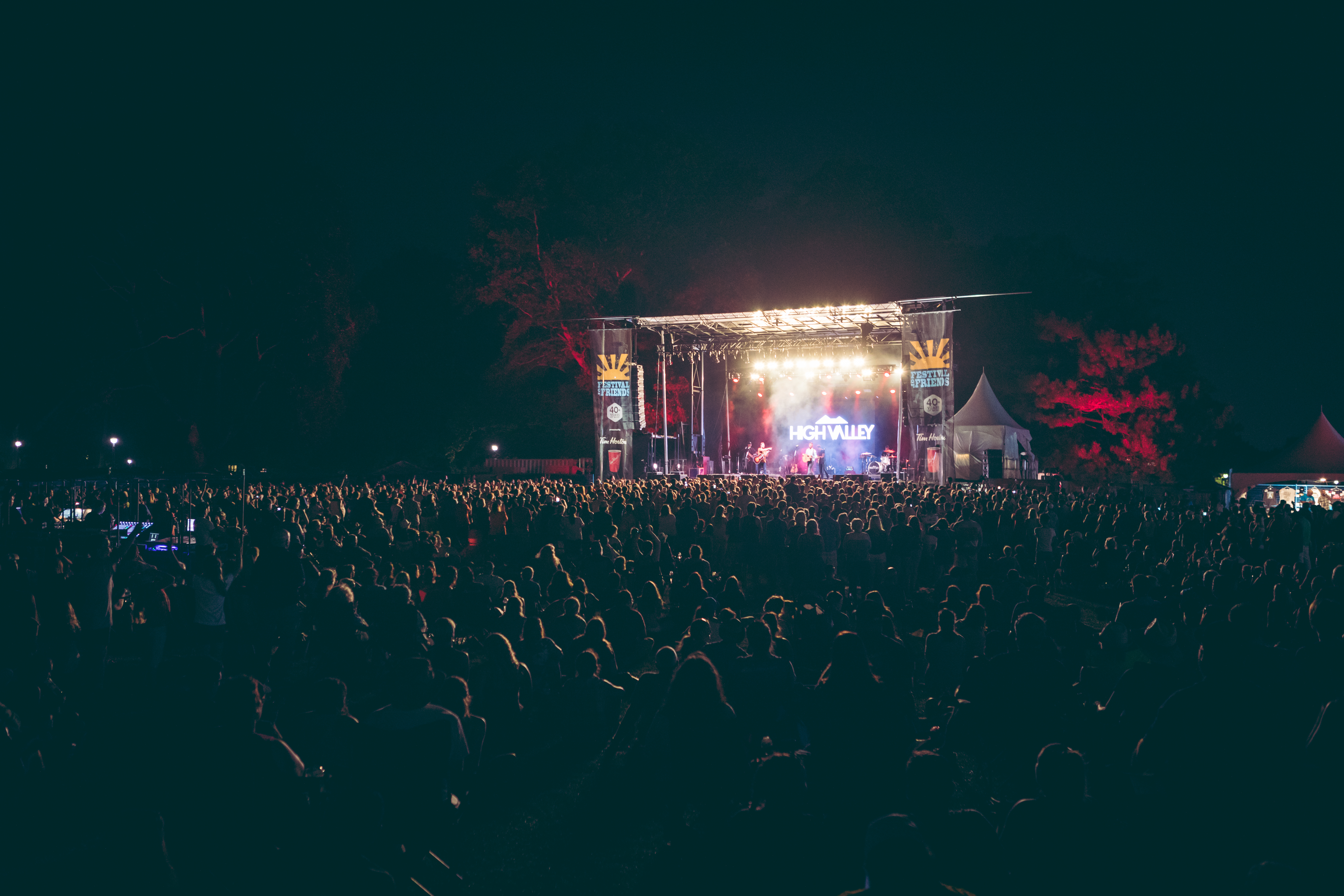
Country group High Valley performs at the 2018 Festival of Friends.
