= Canadian National Bowls Championships =

National Lawn bowls event

Tournament information
- Sport: Lawn bowls
- Location: Canada
- Established: 1954
- Administrator: Bowls Canada
- Website: Bowls Canada

The Canadian National Bowls Championships is organised by Bowls Canada. The first National Championships was held in 1954 for the men's singles, pairs and fours (rinks).

== History ==
The first mention of bowls in Canada was in 1734, when a British garrison at Nova Scotia was granted land to lay down a green.

In 1930, bowls featured at the inaugural Commonwealth Games in Hamilton, Ontario. There were singles, pairs and rinks events.

Two years later in April 1932, the CLBA was constituted, assisted by Alfred Langford. The first President Dr. Weston Krupp and first Vice-president Walter H Cowan were both elected at the inaugural meeting held at the High Park Club, Toronto.

== Men's champions ==
Year	Singles	Pairs	Triples	Fours	Ref
1954	John Linford	Sam Gardiner, Dick Williams	n/a	Edward Brown, H. Jenkins, George Mackintosh, Billy Calder	
1955	John Martin	J. Lang, H. Wheant	n/a	Harry Gardler, Harry Robertson, Stirling Shields, H.C. Woodin	
1956	John Linford	G.W. Davies, W. Black	n/a	Bert Gallagher, Harry Gardler, Harry Robertson, Stirling Shields	
1957	John Linford	Sandy Houston, G. Dewar	n/a	Bert Gallagher, Harry Gardler, Harry Robertson, Stirling Shields	
1958	Neal Salkeld	Graham Jarvis, Tom Jarvis	n/a	L. Somerville, G. Binnie, D. Binnie, Billy Calder	
1959	Harold Clayton	John Miller, G.C. Watkins	n/a	J.H. McGuigan, G.T. Vogt, W. Huston, J.R. Gillette	
1960	M. Durante	J. Hunter, G. Jackson	n/a	Joe Dorsch, L. Moser, Ray Reidel, E. Engle	
1961	J.D. Anderson	G. Rickson, W. Malin	n/a	Edward Brown, George Mackintosh, R.L. McGurk, T. Dickie	
1962	Stirling Shields	Ross Moir, Aiia Hoar	n/a	Edward Brown, Billy Calder, R.L. McGurk, T. Dickie	
1963	Sandy Houston	Joe Dorsch, Ray Reidel	n/a	E.L. Corcoran, C. Christensen, D. McQueen, A. Anthony	
1964	Karl Beacom	Joe Dorsch, Ray Reidel	n/a	S.E. Bond, J.A. Wheler, G.J. Picken, W. Cowling	
1965	Sandy Houston	T. Griffith, Edward Brown	n/a	Don Beaupit, Jim Smart, Bill Gilbert, Fred Marcante	
1966	G. MacMillan	Ronnie Jones, George Robbins	n/a	Al Badley, Carl Theil, W. Devenny, Keith Snider	
1967	Ronnie Jones	Edward Brown, R.L. McGurk	n/a	J. Jarvis, M.M Nelson, T.C. Malcom, G. Anderson	
1968	Bruce Matheson	E. Munro, H. Justason	n/a	Gerry Whitley, D. Grant, H. Maxwell, W.C. Wert	
1969	Harold Clayton	Harry Elliott, John Henderson	n/a	Ted Hodgson, James Denholm, Sam Caffyn, Tom Jarvis	
1970	John Henderson	A. Johnson, C. Burns	n/a	Bill Deakin, Neal Salkeld, Karl Beacom, Jim Law	
1971	Harry Figg	Robert McIntosh, Jim Watkin	n/a	F. Johnson, G. Anderson, Sam Caffyn, B. Leadbetter	
1972	Barrie McFadden	Neal Salkeld, Jim Law	n/a	M. Valoma, T. Lennie, P. Blustein, J. Morrisson	
1973	Dave Burrows	James Macauley, Edward Franklin	n/a	J. Tidd, J. Sproule, A. Brown, R. Campbell	
1974	Ronnie Jones	J. Forbes, G. Knox	n/a	R. Larochelle, W. Kalke, B. Corcoran, Graham Jarvis	
1975	Bruce Matheson	Brad Fleming, Burnie Gill	n/a	J. Tidd, J. MacNeil, J. Wightman	
1976	Bill Postlewaite	K. Thompson, A. Ballem	n/a	D. Anthony, W. Kalke, H. Wheant, Bruce Matheson	
1977	Tom Jarvis	L. Sousae, John Henderson	n/a	Jim Law, Bill Boettger, Ted Nowak, George Boxwell	
1978	John Henderson	Fred Bacon, Glen Patton	n/a	Bob Watkin, Bob McIntosh, Bill Watkin, Jim Watkin	
1979	Ronnie Jones	Bob McQuillan, George Boxwell	n/a	Cameron Smith, Bob Stewart, Bob Gray, Ian Smith	
1980	Dave Duncalf	Graham Jarvis, Dave Brown	n/a	Bob McQuillan, Louis Sousqe, Wayne Hopwood, Jack Mitchell	
1981	Alf Wallace	Dave Duncalf, Bob McQuillan	n/a	Tom Bowness, Ian Jones, Ron James, Bill Watkin	
1982	Robert Walker	John Bush, Dave Houtby	n/a	Wilfred Wright, Richard Klemmer, Brad Flemming, Wayne Wright	
1983	Mark Gilliland	Alf Wallace, Jim Dobson	n/a	Bill Boettger, Bill Amos, Bill Law, Jim Law	
1984	Bob Scullion	George Boxwell, Robert Walker	n/a	Dave Duncalf, Dale Haggerty, Don Brown, Dave Brown	
1985	Graham Jarvis	B. McCartney, R. Ellis	n/a	Kevin Jones, Ronnie Jones, Huron Wintermute, Ken McIntyre	
1986	Dave Duncalf	Bob Scullion, Dave Brown	n/a	G. Ashford, L. Adams, W. Sembaluk, J. Toal	
1987	Dennis Mullane	Keith Roney, Don Kuntz	n/a	Kevin Jones, Ronnie Jones, H. Wintermute, K. McIntyre	
1988	G. Singleton	D. Robinson, E. Acorn	n/a	George Boxwell, B. McQuillan, B. Hinksman, B. Taylor	
1989	Steve Forrest	Alf Wallace, Greg Dolsky	n/a	Keith Roney, J. Zivec, Don Kuntz, D. Pope	
1990	John Donohue	Dave Houtby, Omar Ivanovskis	n/a	Peter Fish, Dave Brown, Dave Duncalf, Mark Raymond	
1991	Mark Gilliland	Keith Roney, Don Kuntz	n/a	Graham Smith, Stephen Wood, Ian Smith, Ron Wood	
1992	Mark Gilliland	G. Singleton, M. Whyte	n/a	Steve Forrest, N. Watkins, J. Aitken, M. Raymond	
1993	Mark Gilliland	Keith Roney, Don Kuntz	n/a	L. Adams, Steve Wojcik, W. Sembaluk	
1994	Greg Dolsky	Lyall Adams, Steve Wojcik	n/a	John Donohue, Monty Adkin, Bob North, Ian Jones	
1995	Mark Gilliland	Cam Smith, Geoff Pershick	n/a	Keith Roney, Don Kuntz, Mark Sutyla, Tom Brown	
1996	Alf Wallace	Dennis Mullance, Terry O'Neill	n/a	Graham Jarvis, Bruce Matheson, Larry Clark, Edwin Waterson	
1997	Mark Sutyla	Steve Wojcik, Mike Cobb	n/a	Danny Ho, Mel Eccles, Jimmy Lai, Lou Sousae	
1998	Alf Wallace	Brad Fleming, Wayne Wright	n/a	Steve Wojcik, Jim Dobson, Stan Nelson, Mike Cobb	
1999	T. Rosario	Alf Wallace, Greg Dolsky	n/a	Chris Grahame, Danny Ho, John Aveline, Alan Webster	
2000	Nick Watkins	Steve Shinnie, G. Law	n/a	E. Waterson, Harry Rihela, Steve Santana, J. de Bruin	
2001	Edwin Waterston	Steve Ogden, Rob Krepps	n/a	Ivan Johannson, Gil Freschauf, Art Wieliczko, Barnes	
2002	David Anderson	Alf Wallace, Lyall Adams	n/a	Dave Houtby, Mark Sandford, Hugh Branston, Ian Jones	
2003	Ryan Stadnyk	Wayne Wright, Don Caswell	n/a	Steve McKerihen, David Anderson, Devonshire, Fred Wallbank	
2004	Alf Wallace	Ryan Bester, Bob Bester	n/a	Ian Jones, Dave Houtby, Hugh Branston, Herb Nesbitt Jr.	
2005	Kevin Jones	Ryan Bester, Bob Bester	n/a	Steve McKerihen, David Anderson, Devonshire, Fred Wallbank	
2006	Mark Sandford	Hirendra Bhartu, Tim Mason	n/a	Ryan Bester, Mike Bester, Bob Bester, Chris Bester	
2007	Chad Trites	Keith Roney, David Calam	n/a	Steve McKerihen, David Anderson, Devonshire, Fred Wallbank	
2008	Hirendra Bhartu	Mark Sandford, Jeff Harding	n/a	Lyall Adams, Pat Bird, Peter Mok, Ivan Johannsen	
2009	Vern Greenhill	Steve Ogden, Stephen Bezanson	n/a	Mike Doskas, Roger Smith, John Devlin, Stephen Sliman	
2010	Michel Larue	Steve Ogden, Stephen Bezanson	n/a	Steve McKerihen, David Anderson, John Devonshire, Fred Wallbank	
2011	Steve Santana	Chris Stadnyk, Jeff Harding	n/a	Jon Pituley, Michael Pituley, Grant Wilkie, Murray Pituley	
2012	Jeff Harding	Steve Ogden, Stephen Bezanson	n/a	Steve McKerihen, David Anderson, Adam McKerihen, Fred Walbank	
2013	David Anderson	Kevin Jones, James Covell	Pat Beggs, Jeff Mulhearn, Elden McLaughlin	Christie Grahame, Dave Baldwin, Stanley Chow, James Chen	
2014	Alfred Wallace	Jonathan Braun, James MacGowan	Keith Roney, Alex Scott, Grant Wilkie	Cary Manns, Vince Mai, Kin On Lau, Clement Law	
2015	John Bjornson	Greg Wilson, Derek Dillon	Roy Reige, Paul Maskell, Keith Johnson	Jon Pituley, Alex Scott, Michael Pituley, Grant Wilkie	
2016	Pat Bird	Jonathan Pituley, Michael Pituley	Steve Ogden, Steve Bezanson, Terry O'Neil	Steve McKerihen, Dave Anderson, Jeff Harding, Fred Wallbank	
2017	Jerome Kirby	Dave Steffen, Rob Steffen	Alex Scott, Grant Wilkie, Murray Pituley	Pat Bird, Lyall Adams, Francis Standen, Herman Cooper	
2018	Earl Luk	Jon Macdonald, Pat Bird	n/a	Jurgen Fessler, Gary Pickering, Michael Spadafora, Mike Wagner	
2019	Michael Leong	Michael Pituley, Jonathan Pituley	n/a	Derek McKie, Lyall Mix, James Smith, Everett Zwiers	
2020 & 2021 cancelled due to COVID-19 pandemic					
2022	Pat Bird	Steve Ogden, Stephen Bezanson	n/a	Pat Bird, Francis Standen, Mike O’Reilly, Jon MacDonald	
2023	Pat Bird	David Anderson, Jeffrey Harding	n/a	Jonathan Pituley, Carter Watson, Brandon Watson, Murray Pituley	
2024	Owen Kirby	Mike Bester, Owen Kirby	Brad Roden, Pat Bird, Nathan Findlay	Greg Wilson, Brad Roden, Nathan Findlay, Mike O'Reilly	

== Women's champions ==
Year	Singles	Pairs	Triples	Fours	Ref
1972	Kaye Minions	Shirley Otis, Nellie Klipp	K. Watt, J. Armstrong, E. Hodkinson		n/a
1973	Kaye Minions	Lilian Crocker, J. Catlow	C. Newbigging, M. Strachan, J. Whitfield	n/a	
1974	Muriel Holness	Mary Hoskin, Norma Grant	D. Wagg, R. Laushway, E. Crossen	n/a	
1975	A. Watson	M. Paterson, Dorothy Randle	Shirley Otis, Nellie Klipp, June Bell	n/a	
1976	June Bell	I. Appleby, B. Crick	S. Kinton, Freda Munro, D. Stirling	n/a	
1977	C. McGregor	Debbie Ballem, E. Mobbs	F. Sims, A. Pentland, M. Townsend	n/a	
1978	Nell Hunter	Doris Ralph, Minnie Price	Agnes Bowlby, Jean Wintermute, Dorothy Mogridge	n/a	
1979	Selena Silva	Dorothy Randle, Mari Paterson	Agnes Bowlby, Jean Wintermute, Dorothy Mogridge	n/a	
1980	Dorothy Randle	Peggy Sims, Sue Kinton	Annette Tidd, Joan Sproule, Janet Campbell	n/a	
1981	Jean Black	Kathy Finch, Ruth Fouts	Trudy Corcoran, Ethel Jones, Evelyn Bell	n/a	
1982	Dorothy Randle	Ruth Fouts, Kathy Finch	Shirley Otis, Norma Grant, Lynda Robbins	n/a	
1983	Nell Hunter	Dorothy Macey, Alice Duncalf	Kathy Finch, Ruth Fouts, Doreen Jarvie	n/a	
1984	Nell Hunter	Dorothy Macey, Alice Duncalf	Debbie Neilson, Peggy Dobson, Margaret Hughes	n/a	
1985	Jean Wintermute	Debbie Foster, J. Wightman	Dorothy Macey, Alice Duncalf, M. Veitch	n/a	
1986	Kathy Finch	Dorothy Macey, Alice Duncalf	Vivian Dearborn, Helen Whalley, Irene Darling	n/a	
1987	Christine Adams	Dorothy Macey, Alice Duncalf	Kathy Finch, S. Broomhall, S. Duncan	n/a	
1988	T. Relmer	Dorothy Macey, Sheila Buttar	E. Green, E. Bell, E. Skiles	n/a	
1989	Jean Roney	D. Neilson, Freda Munro	n/a	Dorothy Macey, Sheila Buttar, S. Broomhall, H. Lam	
1990	Dorothy Macey	Rosina Toal, Margaret Fettes	n/a	Elaine Jones, Marlene Cleutinx, Joan Beveridge, Clarice Fitzpatrick	
1991	Dot Bennett	Mark Meaney, Nell Hunter	n/a	Margaret Richards, Pierette Dery, Johanne Ducap, Laurie Develin	
1992	Margaret Richards	D. Sibley, J. Margurum	n/a	Alice Duncalf, Leona Peterson, Selina Jarvis, A. Eccles	
1993	Jean Roney	Dorothy Macey, B. Harrington	n/a	Alice Duncalf, Leona Peterson, Selina Jarvis, A. Eccles	
1994	Laura Dewald	Elaine Jones, Betty Johnson	n/a	Alice Duncalf, Leona Peterson, Selina Jarvis, Juanita Tucker	
1995	Alice Duncalf	Doreen Creaney, Glenna Boston	n/a	Jean Roney, Clem Grant, Irma Bricker, Kelly Rasmussen	
1996	Margaret Richards	Selina Jarvis, Beryl Harrington	n/a	Marlene Cleutinx, Myrna Oliver, Audrey Schmidt, Glenda Buhr	
1997	Sheila Buttar	Laura Dewald, Harriette Pituley	n/a	Jean Roney, Anita Nivala, Clem Grant, Irma Bricker	
1998	Sheila Buttar	Betty Walker, Lynn McElroy	n/a	Laura Dewald, Cecilia Gillespie, Merle Ackerman, Harriette Pituley	
1999	Doreen Creaney	Shirley Fitzpatrick-Wong, Clarice Fitzpatrick	n/a	Andrea Weigand, Jo Ann Bugler, Gloria McFalls, Carol Carter	
2000	Vivian Condran	Melissa Ranger, D. Ranger	n/a	Laura Dewald, Cecilia Gillespie, Merle Ackerman, Harriette Pituley	
2001	Lynn McElroy	Jean Roney, Rachel Larson	n/a	Laura Dewald, Merle Ackerman, Sylvia Muz, Jean Van Iderstine	
2002	Clarice Fitzpatrick	Annette Tidd, Debbie Foster	n/a	Walker, Lynn McElroy, Elston, Johnson	
2003	Melissa Ranger	Jean Roney, Merle Ackerman	n/a	Shirley Fitzpatrick-Wong, Elaine Jones, Clarice Fitzpatrick, Marilyn Baron	
2004	Laila Hassan	Annette Tidd, Debbie Foster	n/a	Jo Ann Bugler, Goria McFalls, Diane Terry, Carol Carter	
2005	Shirley Ko	Maureen Thompson, Carol Carter	n/a	Cecilia Gillespie, Sylvia Muz, Heather Howard, Wendy	
2006	Leanne Chinery	Harriette Pituley, Rachel Larson	n/a	Elaine Jones, Clarice Fitzpatrick, Anne Wright, Marilyn Baron	
2007	Elaine Jones	Clarice Fitzpatrick, Marilyn Baron	n/a	Jo Ann Bugler, Maureen Thompson, Gloria McFalls, Carol Carter	
2008	Elaine Jones	Marlene Cleutinx, Carolynn Doan	n/a	Shirley Fitzpatrick-Wong, Clarice Fitzpatrick, Donna Law, Marilyn Baron	
2009	Josephine Lee	Shirley Fitzpatrick-Wong, Clarice Fitzpatrick	n/a	Patricia Walker, Cathy Wieliczko, Gayell Slater, Julie Ford	
2010	Clarice Fitzpatrick	Rosina Toal, Laura Lochanski	n/a	Margaret Fettes, Gayell Slater, Cathy Wieliczko, Patricia Walker	
2011	Elaine Jones	Betty Van Walleghem, Sandra Mulholland	n/a	Kelly McKerihen, Laura Seed, Lisa McKerihen, Heather Battles	
2012	Shirley Fitzpatrick-Wong	Clarice Fitzpatrick, Marilyn Baron	n/a	Elaine Jones, Betty Van Walleghem, Betty Grundy, Sandra Mulholland	
2013	Fran Scott	Cecilia Gillespie, Gayell Slater	n/a	Harriette Pituley, Jean Roney, Rachel Larson, Fran Scott	
2014	Jean Roney	Betty Van Walleghem, Sandra Mulholland	n/a	Jean Roney, Jordan Kos, Clem Grant, Carolyn Jones	
2015	Harriette Pituley	Laila Hassan, Chrystal Shephard	n/a	Mary Wright, Anne Mathie, Belle Chan, Anne Van Bastelaere	
2016	Mary Wright	Vivien Chan, Gigi Chan	n/a	Elizabeth Cormack, Laila Hassan, Gloria Cheung, Helena Ho	
2017	Mary Wright	Clairce Fitzpatrick & Shirley Fitzpatrick-Wong	n/a	Josephine Lee, Pricilla Westlake, Sarina Mak, Gigi Chan	
2018	Shirley Fitzpatrick-Wong	Cecilia Gillespie, Pat Vos	n/a	Josephine Lee, Pricilla Westlake, Sarina Mak, Gigi Chan	
2019	Cathy Larking	Peggy Plathan, Patricia Walker	n/a	Claire Day, Amanda Berg, Jennifer MacDonald, Val Wilson	
2020 & 2021 cancelled due to COVID-19 pandemic					
2022	Jordan Kos	Elizabeth Cormack, Chrystal Shephard	n/a	Tammy Foster-Veinot, Jackie Foster, Debbie Foster, Lorraine Bezanson	
2023	Claire Day	Elizabeth Cormack, Chrystal Shephard	n/a	Harriette Pituley, Rachel Larson, Heather Howard, Eileen McLelland	
2024	Betty Van Walleghem	Jan Robinson, Bev Robinson	Cathy Selzler, Shannon Roden, June Ji	Tammy Foster-Veinot, Jackie Foster, Ann Marie Siteman, Lorraine Bezanson	
