= Lawn bowls at the 1998 Commonwealth Games =

- Venue: National Lawn Bowls Centre, Bukit Kiara Sports Complex
- Location: Kuala Lumpur, Malaysia
- Dates: 11 to 21 September 1998

Lawn bowls at the 1998 Commonwealth Games was the 15th appearance of lawn bowls at the Commonwealth Games. Competition took place at the National Lawn Bowls Centre, part of the Bukit Kiara Sports Complex in Kuala Lumpur, Malaysia, from 11 September until 21 September 1998.

South Africa topped the lawn bowls medal table by virtue of winning two gold medals.

== Medal table ==
* Host nation (Malaysia)

Rank	Nation	Gold	Silver	Bronze	Total
1	South Africa	2	0	3	5
2	Australia	1	2	1	4
3	Northern Ireland	1	0	1	2
4	Scotland	1	0	0	1
4	Zimbabwe	1	0	0	1
6	Wales	0	2	2	4
7	Malaysia	0	1	2	3
8	Namibia	0	1	0	1
9	England	0	0	2	2
10	New Zealand	0	0	1	1
Totals (10 entries)		6	6	12	24

== Medallists ==
Event	Gold	Silver	Bronze	Bronze
Men's singles	(Zimbabwe); Roy Garden	(Wales); John Price	(South Africa); Gerry Baker	(Northern Ireland); Jeremy Henry
Men's pairs	(Australia); Brett Duprez; Mark Jacobsen	(Wales); Robert Weale; Will Thomas	(South Africa); Theuns Fraser; Rudi Jacobs	(Malaysia); Mohamed Aziz Maswadi; Mohamed Tazman Tahir
Men's fours	(Northern Ireland); Gary McCloy; Ian McClure; Martin McHugh; Neil Booth	(Australia); Adam Jeffery; Kevin Walsh; Rex Johnston; Stewart Davies	(South Africa); Bruce Makkink; Mike Redshaw; Neil Burkett; Robert Rayfield	(Wales); Dai Wilkins; Ian Slade; Mark Anstey; Neil Rees
Women's singles	(South Africa); Lesley Hartwell	(Malaysia); Saedah Abdul Rahim	(New Zealand); Millie Khan	(England); Jean Baker
Women's pairs	(Scotland); Margaret Letham; Joyce Lindores	(Namibia); Cathelean du Plessis; Lynne Lindsay-Payne	(Australia); Gordana Baric; Willow Fong	(Wales); Rita Jones; Ann Sutherland
Women's fours	(South Africa); Hester Bekker; Loraine Victor; Lorna Trigwell; Trish Steyn	(Australia); Lee Poletti; Karen Murphy; Margaret Sumner; Marilyn Peddell	(England); Catherine Anton; Mandy Jacklin; Norma Shaw; Shirley Page	(Malaysia); Siti Zalina Ahmad; Haslah Hassan; Nor Azwa Mohamed Di; Nor Hashimah Ismail

== Results ==
=== Men's singles – round robin ===
Section A

Pos	Player	P	W	L	F	A	Pts
1	(Zimbabwe) Roy Garden	10	9	1	244	164	18
2	(Northern Ireland) Jeremy Henry +	10	8	2	242	145	16
3	(Australia) Steve Glasson	10	7	3	234	160	14
4	(Fiji) Caucau Turagabeci	10	7	3	211	169	14
5	(England) Tony Allcock	10	6	4	221	174	12
6	(Jersey) David Le Marquand	10	6	4	215	202	12
7	(Guernsey) Neal Mollett	10	5	5	210	212	10
8	(Cook Islands) Ieremia Tuteru	10	3	7	161	234	6
9	(Papua New Guinea) Iamo Ila	10	2	8	179	229	4
10	(Kenya) Charles Wambugu	10	2	8	123	239	4
11	(Samoa) Taituuga Rokeni	10	0	10	138	250	0

Section B

Pos	Player	P	W	L	F	A	Pts
1	(Wales) John Price	10	8	2	234	174	16
2	(South Africa) Gerry Baker +	10	7	3	224	151	14
3	(Scotland) Willie Wood	10	7	3	238	178	14
4	(Canada) Kevin Jones	10	7	3	204	197	14
5	(New Zealand) Rowan Brassey	10	6	4	244	203	12
6	(Malaysia) Syed Mohamad Syed Akil	10	6	4	202	217	12
7	(Botswana) Cliff Richardson	10	5	5	199	216	10
8	(Norfolk Island) Keith Turton	10	3	7	198	231	6
9	(Namibia) Douw Calitz	10	3	7	197	214	6
10	(Zambia) Alexander Kayesa	10	3	7	195	235	6
11	(Brunei) Piut Haji Matrais	10	0	10	131	250	0

+ Awarded Bronze medals

==== Final ====
(Zimbabwe) Garden bt (Wales) Price 25-14

=== Men's pairs – round robin ===
Section A

Pos	Player	P	W	D	L	Pts
1	(Wales) Robert Weale & Will Thomas	10				
2	(Malaysia) Mohamed Aziz Maswadi & Mohamed Tazman Tahir +	10				
3	(Northern Ireland) Noel Graham & Sammy Allen	10				
4	(Zambia) David Culenga & Stanley Maynard	10				
5	(Papua New Guinea) Martin Seeto & Albert Barakeina	10				
6	(New Zealand) Brian Baldwin & Bruce McNish	10				
7	(Namibia) Jurie Calitz & Petrus Opperman	10				
8	(Canada) Jamie McLellan & Mark Sandford	10				
9	(Brunei) Haji Naim Brahim & Salleh HJ Hitam	10				
10	(Samoa) Leau Tolepaialii & Letufuga Olopoto	10				

Section B

Pos	Player	P	W	D	L	Pts
1	(Australia) Brett Duprez & Mark Jacobsen	8				
2	(South Africa) Theuns Fraser & Rudi Jacobs +	8				
3	(Scotland) Alex Marshall & David Gourlay Jr.	8				
4	(Fiji) Peter Thaggard & Arun Kumar	8				
5	(England) John Ottaway & David Cutler	8				
6	(Norfolk Island) Barry Wilson & John Christian	8				
7	(Cook Islands) Takai Tuatai & David Akaruru	8				
8	(Kenya) Alan Gilham & Geoff Collie	8				
9	(Eswatini) Allan Thomas & Dave Thompson	8				

+ Awarded Bronze medals

==== Final ====
Australia bt Wales 16-14

=== Men's fours – round robin ===
Section A

Pos	Player	P	W	D	L	F	A	Pts
1	(Australia) Adam Jeffery, Kevin Walsh, Rex Johnston, Stewart Davies	9						
2	(South Africa) Bruce Makkink, Mike Redshaw, Neil Burkett, Robert Rayfield +	9						
3	(England) Brett Morley, Grant Burgess, John Bell, Andy Thomson	9						
4	(Scotland) Kenny Logan, Jim McIntyre, John Aitken, George Adrain	9						
5	(Namibia) John Shelley, Graham Snyman, Willem Esterhuizen Sr., Alexander Joubert	9						
6	(Fiji) Ratish Lal, Saijad Khan, Rajnish Lal, Ram Shankar	9						
7	(Zimbabwe) Richard Hayden, William Cumming, Michael McNeill, Robert Robison	9						
8	(Papua New Guinea) Nadu Namun, Kossy Torao, Kundi Miki, Jack Wau	9						
9	(Samoa) Taumaatu Turituri, Toleafoa Faasau, Piliato Tuuau, Tuliloa Fua	9						
10	(Botswana) Ray Marscarenhas, Tim Morton, Ian Martin, Arthur Hicks	9						

Section B

Pos	Player	P	W	D	L	F	A	Pts
1	(Northern Ireland) Gary McCloy, Ian McClure, Martin McHugh, Neil Booth	9						
2	(Wales) Dai Wilkins, Ian Slade, Mark Anstey, Neil Rees +	9						
3	(New Zealand) Peter Belliss, Andrew Curtain, Peter Shaw, Russell Meyer	9						
4	(Guernsey) Ian Merrien, Dennis Baglin, Paul Ingrouille, Dave Lucas	9						
5	(Canada) Ian Jones, Keith Roney, Stephen Wojcik, Kevin Jones	9						
6	(Malaysia) Mohd Afendy Tan Abdullah, Jozaini Johari, Nurdin Sabli, Sazeli Sani	9						
7	(Eswatini) Terence Smith, David Bramley, Leon Takis, David Tolson	9						
8	(Norfolk Island) Graeme Woolley, Mitchel Graham, David Smith, Gregory Hinks	9						
9	(Brunei) Haji Norhadi Haji Mohd, Piut Haji Matrais, Ghafar PDH Taha, Lokman Haji Salleh	9						
10	(Cook Islands) Vainepoto-O-Nga-Ua Tokorangi, Hererua Howard, Eric Ponia, Philip Urlich	9						

+ Awarded Bronze medals

==== Final ====
Northern Ireland bt Australia 26-21

=== Women's singles – round robin ===
Section A

Pos	Player	P	W	L	F	A	Pts
1	(South Africa) Lesley Hartwell	8	7	1	188	136	14
2	(New Zealand) Millie Khan +	8	6	2	173	130	12
3	(Zimbabwe) Anne Carrington	8	5	3	184	174	10
4	(Scotland) Julie Forrest	8	5	3	156	164	10
5	(Northern Ireland) Margaret Johnston	8	3	5	177	162	6
6	(Norfolk Island) Carmen Anderson	8	3	5	156	156	6
7	(Jersey) Karina Horman	8	3	5	170	185	6
8	(Fiji) Radhika Prasad	8	3	5	146	195	6
9	(Papua New Guinea) Wagi Bai	8	1	7	136	184	2

Section B

Pos	Player	P	W	L	F	A	Pts
1	(Malaysia) Saedah Abdul Rahim	8	7	1	194	124	14
2	(England) Jean Baker +	8	7	1	195	131	14
3	(Australia) Roma Dunn	8	7	1	199	136	14
4	(Wales) Judith Wason	8	5	3	178	149	10
5	(Cook Islands) Tanimetua Harry	8	3	5	165	180	6
6	(Samoa) Lagi Letoa	8	3	5	116	166	6
7	(Zambia) Matimba Like	8	2	6	128	178	4
8	(Namibia) Anne Ainsworth	8	1	7	152	194	2
9	(Botswana) Babs Anderson	8	1	7	127	196	2

+ Awarded Bronze medals

==== Final ====
(South Africa) Hartwell bt (Malaysia) Rahim 25-14

=== Women's pairs – round robin ===
Section A

Pos	Player	P	W	D	L	F	A	Pts
1	(Scotland) Margaret Letham & Joyce Lindores	10						
2	(Wales) Rita Jones & Ann Sutherland +	10						
3	(New Zealand) Judith Payne & Marlene Castle	10						
4	(Fiji) Doreen Newton & Litia Tikoisuva	10						
5	(Malaysia) Siti Hawa Ali & Bah Chu Mei	10						
6	(Zambia) Beatrice Mali & Hilda Luipa	10						
7	(England) Katherine Hawes & Mary Price	10						
8	(Kenya) Susan Kariuki & Bharti Babla	10						
9	(Norfolk Island) Pauline Turton & Essie Sanchez	10						
10	(Guernsey) Eunice Trebert & Alison Merrien	10						
11	(Northern Ireland) Paula Montgomery & Barbara Cameron	10						

Section B

Pos	Player	P	W	D	L	F	A	Pts
1	(Namibia) Cathelean du Plessis & Lynne Lindsay-Payne	9						
2	(Australia) Gordana Baric & Willow Fong +	9						
3	(Jersey) Jean Jones & Sheila Syvret	9						
4	(South Africa) Sharon Glenn & Jill Hackland	9						
5	(Papua New Guinea) Maggie Worri & Helen Manau	9						
6	(Zimbabwe) Cora Howard-Williams & Judith Penfold	9						
7	(Canada) On-Kow Au & Marlene Cleutinx	9						
8	(Cook Islands) Rebecca Akaruru & Makiua Tairi	9						
9	(Eswatini) Jaqueline Reeve & Karin McGravie	9						
10	(Samoa) Perka Lee & Manuia Porter	9						

+ Awarded Bronze medals

==== Final ====
Scotland bt Namibia 31-8

=== Women's fours – round robin ===
Section A

Pos	Player	P	W	D	L	F	A	Pts
1	(Australia) Lee Poletti, Karen Murphy, Margaret Sumner, Marilyn Peddell	8						
2	(England) Catherine Anton, Mandy Jacklin, Norma Shaw, Shirley Page +	8						
3	(Guernsey) Jean Martel, June Finnigan, Sheila Cave, Sally Paul	8						
4	(Scotland) Joyce Miller, Liz Dickson, Betty Forsyth, Sarah Gourlay	8						
5	(Namibia) Jean Joubert, Robyn Crawford, Patricia Shelley, Debora Esterhuizen	8						
6	(Northern Ireland) Alicia Crangle, Geraldine Law, Donna McNally, Patricia Horner	8						
7	(Canada) Doreen Creaney, Anita Nivala, Margaret Richards, Jean Roney	8						
8	(Fiji) S. Lacakavukavu, Sereana Smith, Akanisi Stephens, Vimla Swamy	8						
9	(Botswana) Shirley Baylis, Linda Hunt, Lebo Moroke, Thambie Drewett	8						

Section B

Pos	Player	P	W	D	L	F	A	Pts
1	(South Africa) Hester Bekker, Loraine Victor, Lorna Trigwell, Trish Steyn	8						
2	(Malaysia) Siti Zalina Ahmad, Haslah Hassan, Nor Azwa Mohamed Di, Nor Hashimah Ismail +	8						
3	(New Zealand) Anne Lomas, Karen Coombe, Sharon Sims, Patsy Jorgensen	8						
4	(Wales) Kathy Pearce, Sarah Mansbridge, Gill Miles, Betty Morgan	8						
5	(Samoa) Faaniniv a Paulo, Faamumoi Rokeni, Akenese Westerlund, T. Tuiletufuga	8						
6	(Eswatini) Dawn Squires, Geraldine Thomas, Wendy Vickery, Mariana Goddard	8						
7	(Norfolk Island) Gae Robertson, Kitha Bailey, Joyce Dyer, Beverly Wheeler	8						
8	(Papua New Guinea) Lalu Kisokol, Cunera Monalua, Olive Babaga, Linda Ahmat	8						
9	(Cook Islands) Kanny Vaile, Dorothy Paniani, Tremoana Damm, Ngatungawe Tere	8						

+ Awarded Bronze medals

==== Final ====
South Africa bt Australia 17-16

== See also ==
- List of Commonwealth Games medallists in lawn bowls
- Lawn bowls at the Commonwealth Games
