= South Africa at the 1998 Commonwealth Games =

- Flag of South Africa
- CGF code: RSA
- CGA: South African Sports Confederation and Olympic Committee
- Website: teamsa.co.za

in Kuala Lumpur, Malaysia 11 September 1998 – 21 September 1998
- Medals Ranked 5th: Gold 9 Silver 11 Bronze 14 Total 34

Commonwealth Games appearances (overview)
- 1930; 1934; 1938; 1950; 1954; 1958; 1962–1990; 1994; 1998; 2002; 2006; 2010; 2014; 2018; 2022; 2026; 2030

South Africa competed at the 1998 Commonwealth Games in Kuala Lumpur, Malaysia from 11 to 21 September 1998. It was South Africa's 8th appearance at the Commonwealth Games.

== Medalists ==
The following South African competitors won medals at the games. In the discipline sections below, the medalists' names are bolded.

Medal	Name	Sport	Event
Gold	Riaan Botha	Athletics	Men's pole vault
Gold	Burger Lambrechts	Athletics	Men's shot put
Gold	Marius Corbett	Athletics	Men's javelin throw
Gold	Hestrie Storbeck	Athletics	Women's high jump
Gold	South Africa men's national cricket team: Shaun Pollock; Paul Adams; Dale Benkenstein; Nicky Boje; Mark Boucher; Derek Crookes; Alan Dawson; Steve Elworthy; Herschelle Gibbs; Andrew Hudson; Jacques Kallis; Makhaya Ntini; Michael Rindel; Henry Williams	Cricket	Men's tournament
Gold	Simon Hutcheon	Gymnastics	Men's vault
Gold	Lesley Hartwell	Lawn bowls	Women's singles
Gold	Hester Bekker; Loraine Victor; Lorna Trigwell; Trish Steyn	Lawn bowls	Women's fours
Gold	Gavin van Rhyn; Michael Thiele	Shooting	Men's 50 metre rifle prone pairs
Silver	Hezekiél Sepeng	Athletics	Men's 800 metres
Silver	Frantz Kruger	Athletics	Men's discus throw
Silver	Elmarie Gerryts	Athletics	Women's pole vault
Silver	Christian Brezeanu	Gymnastics	Men's floor
Silver	Christian Brezeanu	Gymnastics	Men's vault
Silver	Allan McDonald	Shooting	Men's 25 metre centre-fire pistol individual
Silver	Francois Van Tonder	Shooting	Men's 50 metre pistol individual
Silver	Allan McDonald	Shooting	Men's 25 metre rapid fire pistol individual
Silver	Val Martin; Donna Potgieter	Shooting	Women's 50 metre rifle three positions pairs
Silver	Brendon Dedekind	Swimming	Men's 50 metre freestyle
Silver	Ryk Neethling	Swimming	Men's 1500 metre freestyle
Bronze	Johan Botha	Athletics	Men's 800 metres
Bronze	Shaun Bownes	Athletics	Men's 110 metres hurdles
Bronze	Chris Harmse	Athletics	Men's hammer throw
Bronze	Veronica Abrahamse	Athletics	Women's shot put
Bronze	Phumzile Matyhila	Boxing	Flyweight
Bronze	David George	Cycling	Men's road time trial
Bronze	Athol Myhill	Gymnastics	Men's rings
Bronze	Gerald Baker	Lawn bowls	Men's singles
Bronze	Theuns Fraser; Rudi Jacobs	Lawn bowls	Men's pairs
Bronze	Bruce Makkink; Mike Redshaw; Neil Burkett; Robert Rayfield	Lawn bowls	Men's fours
Bronze	Allan McDonald; André van Emmenis	Shooting	Men's 25 metre rapid fire pistol pairs
Bronze	Gavin van Rhyn; André van Emmenis	Shooting	Men's 50 metre rifle prone individual
Bronze	Natalie Grainger; Claire Nitch	Squash	Women's doubles
Bronze	Rodney Durbach; Natalie Grainger	Squash	Mixed doubles

== Cricket ==
South Africa named the below squad for the tournament.

Roster

- Shaun Pollock (c)
- Paul Adams
- ~~Adam Bacher~~
- Dale Benkenstein
- Nicky Boje
- Mark Boucher (wk)
- Derek Crookes
- Alan Dawson
- Steve Elworthy
- Herschelle Gibbs
- Andrew Hudson
- Jacques Kallis
- ~~Lance Klusener~~
- Makhaya Ntini
- Michael Rindel
- Henry Williams

Lance Klusener withdrew from the South African squad after sustaining an ankle injury during the third Test of South Africa's tour of England in July. Adam Bacher was also unavailable for the Games, suffering an injury to his shoulder. They were replaced by Alan Dawson and Andrew Hudson, respectively.

Summary

Team	Event	Group stage				Semifinal	Final / BM	
Team	Event	Opposition Result	Opposition Result	Opposition Result	Rank	Opposition Result	Opposition Result	Rank
South Africa men	Men's tournament	Northern Ireland; W by 4 wickets (D/L)	Bangladesh; W by 5 wickets	Barbados; W by 4 wickets	1 Q	Sri Lanka; W by 1 wicket	Australia; W by 4 wickets	1st place, gold medalist(s)

Group stage

Group C
Pos	Team	Pld	W	L	T	NR	Pts	NRR
1	South Africa	3	3	0	0	0	6	1.143
2	Barbados	3	2	1	0	0	4	1.330
3	Northern Ireland	3	1	2	0	0	2	−0.643
4	Bangladesh	3	0	3	0	0	0	−1.547

Source: ESPNcricinfo

10 September 1998
10:00
Scorecard

Northern Ireland; 89/5 (38.1 overs)	v	South Africa; 133/6 (31.4 overs)
Neil Carson 22* (54); Jacques Kallis 1/3 (4 overs)		Dale Benkenstein 44* (64); Ryan Eagleson 3/28 (7.4 overs)

South Africa won by 4 wickets (D/L method)
Kelab Aman, Kuala Lumpur
Umpires: Eddie Nicholls (Guy) and Subhash Modi (Ken)

- South Africa won the toss and elected to field.
- Rain halted play after 38.1 overs in the Northern Ireland innings. South Africa's target was 131 runs from 38 overs.
- Neil Carson (NI) made his List A debut.
- Paul McCrum (NI) played his final List A match.
- Points: South Africa 2, Northern Ireland 0.

13 September 1998
10:00
Scorecard

Bangladesh; 79 (38.4 overs)	v	South Africa; 80/5 (24.3 overs)
Faruque Ahmed 20 (48); Jacques Kallis 3/13 (7 overs)		Herschelle Gibbs 26* (51); Mohammad Rafique 2/16 (7.3 overs)

South Africa won by 5 wickets
Perbadanan Kemajuan Negeri Selangor Sports Complex, Petaling Jaya
Umpires: Eddie Nicholls (Guy) and Subhash Modi (Ken)

- South Africa won the toss and elected to field.
- Points: South Africa 2, Bangladesh 0.
- Bangladesh were eliminated as a result of this match.

15 September 1998
10:00
Scorecard

Barbados; 254/6 (50 overs)	v	South Africa; 257/6 (48.2 overs)
Philo Wallace 74 (73); Alan Dawson 2/47 (8 overs)		Jacques Kallis 71 (96); Ottis Gibson 3/38 (9 overs)

South Africa won by 4 wickets
Kelab Aman, Kuala Lumpur
Umpires: K. T. Francis (SL) and V. K. Ramaswamy (Ind)

- Barbados won the toss and elected to bat.
- Points: South Africa 2, Barbados 0.
- South Africa qualified for the semi-finals and Barbados were eliminated as a result of this match.

Semi-final

16 September 1998
10:00
Scorecard

Sri Lanka; 130 (44 overs)	v	South Africa; 131/9 (47 overs)
Avishka Gunawardene 53 (87); Nicky Boje 4/16 (9 overs)		Michael Rindel 25 (28); Thilan Samaraweera 2/13 (10 overs)

South Africa won by 1 wicket
Perbadanan Kemajuan Negeri Selangor Sports Complex, Petaling Jaya
Umpires: Darrell Hair (Aus) and Russell Tiffin (Zim)

- South Africa won the toss and elected to field.

Gold medal match

19 September 1998
10:00
Scorecard

Australia; 183 (49.3 overs)	v	South Africa; 184/6 (46 overs)
Steve Waugh 90* (109); Shaun Pollock 4/19 (9 overs)		Michael Rindel 67 (106); Darren Lehmann 3/14 (4 overs)

South Africa won by 4 wickets
Perbadanan Kemajuan Negeri Selangor Sports Complex, Petaling Jaya
Umpires: K. T. Francis (SL) and Steve Bucknor (Jam)

- South Africa won the toss and elected to field.
- The crowd of 7,532 was the largest recorded crowd for a cricket match in Malaysia.
- This marked the first championship for South Africa at an ICC global event or a global multi-sport event. However, the matches did not have ODI status.

== Netball ==
Squad

- Marilyn Agliotti
- Patricia Basson
- Kerry Bee
- Bronwyn Bock
- Florinda Brand
- Pietie Coetzee
- Dominique Harverson
- Annie Kloppers
- Desmarie Kotze
- Manzo Machago
- Rosina Mogale
- Desree Neville
- Lana van der Westhuizen
- Irene van Dyk
- Letitia Vorster

Summary

South Africa finished 4th in the netball at the 1998 Commonwealth Games. In the group stages, they won four of their five matches. However, in the semi-finals they lost 68–38 to Australia. In the bronze medal playoff they lost 56–54 England.

Group B

14 September 1998	South Africa	91–22	Sri Lanka

15 September 1998	South Africa	66–27	Wales

16 September 1998	South Africa	55–45	Malawi

17 September 1998	South Africa	68–50	Cook Islands

18 September 1998	New Zealand	63–35	South Africa

Pos	Team	P	W	D	L	GF	GA	GD	Pts
1	New Zealand	5	5	0	0	416	141	+275	10
2	South Africa	5	4	0	1	315	207	+108	8
3	Cook Islands	5	2	1	2	283	330	-47	5
4	Malawi	5	2	0	3	283	270	-13	4
5	Wales	5	1	1	3	220	321	-101	3
6	Sri Lanka	5	0	0	5	157	405	-248	0

Qualified for Semi-final 1
Qualified for Semi-final 2

Playoffs
Semi-final 1

19 September 1998	Australia	68–38	South Africa

Bronze medal match

21 September 1998	England	56–54	South Africa
