= Malaysia at the 1999 SEA Games =

Malaysia at the 1999 Southeast Asian Games
- IOC code: MAS
- NOC: Olympic Council of Malaysia
- Website: www.olympic.org.my (in English)

in Bandar Seri Begawan
- Competitors: 307 in 20 sports
- Flag bearer: Sapok Biki
- Medals Ranked 2nd: Gold 57 Silver 45 Bronze 42 Total 144

Southeast Asian Games appearances (overview)
- 1959; 1961; 1965; 1967; 1969; 1971; 1973; 1975; 1977; 1979; 1981; 1983; 1985; 1987; 1989; 1991; 1993; 1995; 1997; 1999; 2001; 2003; 2005; 2007; 2009; 2011; 2013; 2015; 2017; 2019; 2021; 2023; 2025; 2027; 2029

Malaysia competed in the 1999 Southeast Asian Games held in Bandar Seri Begawan, Brunei from 7 to 15 August 1999.

== Medal summary ==
=== Medals by sport ===
Sport	Gold	Silver	Bronze	Total	Rank
Athletics	12	0	0	12	
Badminton	1	3	3	7	2
Diving	0	1	1	2	
Golf	0	1	1	2	
Lawn bowls	4	1	1	6	1
Squash	4	0	0	4	1
Table tennis	0	0	1	1	5
Total	57	45	42	144	2

=== Medallists ===
Medal	Name	Sport	Event
Gold	Arumugam Munusamy	Athletics	Men's 1500 metres
Gold	Munusamy Ramachandran	Athletics	Men's 5000 metres
Gold	Munusamy Ramachandran	Athletics	Men's 10,000 metres
Gold	Nur Herman Majid	Athletics	Men's 110 metres hurdles
Gold	Loo Kum Zee	Athletics	Men's high jump
Gold	Wong Tee Kue	Athletics	Men's hammer throw
Gold	Mohd Malik Ahmad Tobias	Athletics	Men's decathlon
Gold	Harbans Narinder Singh	Athletics	Men's 20 kilometres road walk
Gold	Manimagalay Nadarajah	Athletics	Women's 400 metres
Gold	Yuan Yufang	Athletics	Women's 10,000 metres
Gold	Noraseela Mohd Khalid	Athletics	Women's 400 metres hurdles
Gold	Yuan Yufang	Athletics	Women's 10,000 metres track walk
Gold	Chew Choon Eng; Chor Hooi Yee	Badminton	Mixed doubles
Gold	Ibrahim Jusoh; Mohamed Tazman Tahir	Lawn bowls	Men's pairs
Gold	Firdaus Ghuas; Jozaini Johari; Zuraidi Puteh; Sazeli Saniff	Lawn bowls	Men's fours
Gold	Siti Zalina Ahmad; Nor Hashimah Ismail	Lawn bowls	Women's pairs
Gold	Nor Azwa Mohamed Di; Siti Hawa Ali; Bah Chu Mei; Haslah Hassan	Lawn bowls	Women's four
Gold		Squash	Men's singles
Gold		Squash	Women's singles
Gold		Squash	Men's team
Gold		Squash	Women's team
Gold		Taekwondo	
Silver	Wong Choong Hann	Badminton	Men's singles
Silver	Rosman Razak; Norhasikin Amin	Badminton	Mixed doubles
Silver	Malaysia national badminton team: Chew Choon Eng; Choong Tan Fook; Jason Wong; Lee Chee Leong; Lee Wan Wah; Roslin Hashim; Rosman Razak; Tan Kim Her; Wong Choong Hann; Yong Hock Kin	Badminton	Men's team
Silver	Leong Mun Yee	Diving	Women's 3 metre springboard
Silver		Golf	
Silver	Saedah Abdul Rahim	Lawn bowls	Women's singles
Bronze	Roslin Hashim	Badminton	Men's singles
Bronze	Choong Tan Fook; Lee Wan Wah	Badminton	Men's doubles
Bronze	Malaysia national badminton team: Ang Li Peng; Joanne Quay; Lee Yin Yin; Ng Mee Fen; Woon Sze Mei	Badminton	Women's team
Bronze	Leong Mun Yee	Diving	Women's 10 metre platform
Bronze		Golf	
Bronze	Syed Mohamad Syed Akil	Lawn bowls	Men's singles
Bronze	Eng Tian Syh; Chan Koon Wah; Choo Sim Guan; Ng Shui Leong	Table tennis	Men's team

== Football ==
=== Men's tournament ===
Group B

Team	Pld	W	D	L	GF	GA	GD	Pts
Indonesia	4	3	1	0	11	1	+10	10
Singapore	4	3	1	0	8	3	+5	10
Malaysia	4	2	0	2	10	10	0	6
Brunei	4	0	1	3	4	11	−7	1
Cambodia	4	0	1	3	5	13	−8	1

31 July 1999

Singapore	2 – 1	Malaysia
Nazri Nasir 59'; Mohd Noor Ali 86'		Azizul Kamaluddin 87'

Berakas Sports Complex, Bandar Seri Begawan
Attendance: 2,000
Referee: Permpanich Pongsathorn (Thailand)

2 August 1999

Indonesia	6 – 0	Malaysia
Harianto Prasetyo 6'; Rochi Putiray 9', 84'; Bambang Pamungkas 51', 58'; Ali Sunan 82'

Berakas Track and Field Complex, Bandar Seri Begawan
Attendance: 2,000
Referee: Permpanich Pongsathorn (Thailand)

4 August 1999

Cambodia	2 – 7	Malaysia
Hok Sochetra 17'; Chan Arunreath 36'		Ahmad Shahrul Azhar Sofian 8', 46', 89'; Wan Rohaimi Wan Ismail 22', 71'; Rusdi Suparman 66', 81'

Berakas Sports Complex, Bandar Seri Begawan
Attendance: 1,000
Referee: Nguyen Van Mui (Vietnam)

6 August 1999

Brunei	0 – 2	Malaysia
		Asmawi Bakiri 18'; Azizul Kamaluddin 85'

Berakas Track and Field Complex, Bandar Seri Begawan
Attendance: 3,000
Referee: Nguyen Van Mui (Vietnam)
