= 2004 World Outdoor Bowls Championship – Men's fours =

Lawn bowls event

World Bowls Championship 2004 men's fours
- 10th World Outdoor Bowls Championships
- Location: Ayr, Scotland
- Date(s): 23 July – 7 August, 2004
- Category: World Bowls Championship

The 2004 World Outdoor Bowls Championship men's fours was held at the Northfield Bowls Complex in Ayr, Scotland, from 23 July – 7 August 2004.

Jonathan Ross, Noel Graham, Neil Booth and Jim Baker of Ireland won the gold medal.

== Qualifying round ==
Four sections, three teams from each section qualify for championship round.

=== Section 1 ===
Pos	Player	P	W	D	L	F	A	Pts
1	Jonathan Ross, Noel Graham, Neil Booth, Jim Baker	5	4	0	1	105	65	8
2	(Spain) Matt Tew, Russell Marks, Stephen McManus, John Sullivan	5	4	0	1	82	93	8
3	(Wales) Neil Rees, Dai Wilkins, Robert Weale, Jason Greenslade	5	3	0	2	113	62	6
4	(Zimbabwe) Adrien Mellows, Roy Garden, Chinky Marillier & Richard Hayden	5	3	0	2	90	69	6
5	(Eswatini) David Bramley, Mark Svenningsen, Louis Erasmus & Derek James	5	1	0	4	63	98	2
6	(Japan) Hiroyuki Oda, Daisuke Takimura, Stephen Wedge & Makoto Yamada	5	0	0	5	49	117	0

=== Section 2 ===
Pos	Player	P	W	D	L	F	A	Pts
1	(England) John Rednall, Mervyn King, Robert Newman, Andy Thomson	5	4	0	1	99	65	8
2	(South Africa) Eric Johannes, Michael Steyn, Neil Burkett, Gerry Baker	5	3	0	2	113	77	6
3	(Namibia) Sandy Joubert, John Shelley, Ewald Vermeulen, Graham Snyman	5	3	0	2	89	80	6
4	(United States) Hugh Finlay, Richard Broad, Jack Behling & Neil Furman	5	3	0	2	83	85	6
5	(Malaysia) Safuan Said, Ramble Dallan Rice-Oxley, Fairul Izwan Abd Muin & Mohamed Aziz Maswadi	5	1	0	4	70	99	2
6	(Norfolk Island) Warren Cranston, Ian Webb, Philip Billman & Noel Rawlinson	5	1	0	4	58	106	2

=== Section 3 ===
Pos	Player	P	W	D	L	F	A	Pts
1	(Scotland) Jim McIntyre, Willie Wood, David Peacock, George Sneddon	5	5	0	0	112	58	10
2	(Philippines) Damien Allison, Angelo Morales, Peter O'Donnell, Harry Anderson	5	3	0	2	96	85	6
3	(Brazil) Ascendino Melo, Fabo Melo, Mercantonio Fabra, Gary Oughton	5	2	1	2	78	86	5
4	(Hong Kong) Adam Poynton, Robin Chok, Jimmy Chiu & Loy D'Souza	5	2	0	3	68	90	4
5	(Israel) Aryeh Ben Dor, Tzvika Hadar, Colin Silberstein & Raymond Sher	5	1	1	3	81	84	3
6	(Fiji) Semesa Naiseruvati, Shushil Deo Sharma, Rajnish Lal & Keshwa Goundar	5	0	0	5	71	103	0

=== Section 4 ===
Pos	Player	P	W	D	L	F	A	Pts
1	(Australia) Brett Duprez, Kelvin Kerkow, Kevin Walsh, Michael Wilks	5	5	0	0	101	61	10
2	(Canada) Keith Roney, Lyall Adams, Wayne Wright, Ryan Bester	5	4	0	1	101	62	8
3	(New Zealand) Rowan Brassey, Sean Johnson, Gary Lawson, Paul Girdler	5	2	0	3	115	62	4
4	(Kenya) Andrew Jones, Allan Gilham, Kiernan Day & Ian Stamp	5	2	0	3	85	97	4
5	(Samoa) Talaimanu Keti, Harry Porter, John Silva & Namulauulu Letufaga	5	2	0	3	52	132	4
6	(Jersey) Alan Shaw, Derek Boswell, David Le Marquand & Lee Nixon	5	0	0	5	66	106	0

== Championship round ==
=== Section 1 ===
Pos	Player	P	W	L	F	A	Pts
1	Australia	5	5	0	118	66	10
2	England	5	3	2	98	710	6
3	Spain	5	2	3	77	80	4
4	Wales	5	2	3	76	90	4
5	Namibia	5	2	3	65	101	4
6	Philippines	5	1	4	81	104	2

=== Section 2 ===
Pos	Player	P	W	L	F	A	Pts
1	Ireland	5	5	0	102	54	10
2	New Zealand	5	4	1	97	78	8
3	Scotland	5	2	3	86	81	4
4	South Africa	5	2	3	92	92	4
5	Canada	5	2	3	78	82	4
6	Brazil	5	0	5	495	117	0

== Bronze medal match ==
England beat New Zealand 18–17.

== Gold medal match ==
Combined Ireland beat Australia 19–18.

== Results ==
Men's fours section 1
Round 1 – Aug 1		
Ireland	Zimbabwe	17–16
Spain	(Eswatini) Swaziland	19–18
Wales	Japan	32–4
Round 2 – Aug 1		
Ireland	(Eswatini) Swaziland	23–8
Spain	Wales	18–17
Zimbabwe	Japan	24–7
Round 3 – Aug 2		
Ireland	Japan	22–12
Wales	(Eswatini) Swaziland	29–7
Spain	Zimbabwe	19–15
Round 4 – Aug 2		
Ireland	Spain	28–6
(Eswatini) Swaziland	Japan	19–11
Zimbabwe	Wales	19–14
Round 5 – Aug 3		
Spain	Japan	20–15
Wales	Ireland	21–14
Zimbabwe	(Eswatini) Swaziland	16–11

Men's fours section 2
Round 1 – Aug 1		
England	Malaysia	17–14
South Africa	Norfolk Island	29–5
United States	Namibia	14–13
Round 2 – Aug 1		
England	United States	22–11
Norfolk Island	Malaysia	19–10
South Africa	Namibia	29–15
Round 3 – Aug 2		
England	Norfolk Island	28–11
Namibia	Malaysia	24–11
South Africa	United States	26–17
Round 4 – Aug 2		
Namibia	England	19–14
Malaysia	South Africa	22–19
United States	Norfolk Island	21–11
Round 5 – Aug 3		
United States	Malaysia	20–13
Namibia	Norfolk Island	18–12
England	South Africa	18–10

Men's fours section 3
Round 1 – Aug 1		
Brazil	Fiji	17–14
Scotland	Philippines	15–11
Hong Kong	Israel	15–14
Round 2 – Aug 1		
Philippines	Israel	23–17
Scotland	Brazil	28–9
Fiji	Hong Kong	14–13
Round 3 – Aug 2		
Hong Kong	Philippines	18–16
Israel	Brazil	15–15
Scotland	Fiji	21–16
Round 4 – Aug 2		
Philippines	Fiji	28–19
Brazil	Hong Kong	21–11
Scotland	Israel	23–11
Round 5 – Aug 3		
Philippines	Brazil	18–16
Israel	Fiji	24–8
Scotland	Hong Kong	25–11

Men's fours section 4
Round 1 – Aug 1		
Australia	Canada	16–11
Jersey	Kenya	15–11
New Zealand	Samoa	42–2
Round 2 – Aug 1		
Australia	Jersey	23–18
Canada	Samoa	21–11
Kenya	New Zealand	21–20
Round 3 – Aug 2		
Australia	Samoa	21–10
Canada	Kenya	26–13
New Zealand	Jersey	27–7
Round 4 – Aug 2		
Australia	Kenya	26–12
Jersey	Samoa	20–19
Canada	New Zealand	17–16
Round 5 – Aug 3		
Canada	Jersey	26–6
Australia	New Zealand	15–11
Kenya	Samoa	28–10

Men's singles championship section A
Round 1 – Aug 3		
Australia	England	21–9
Spain	Philippines	24–15
Wales	Namibia	15–13
Round 2 – Aug 4		
Australia	Namibia	32–10
Spain	England	18–13
Philippines	Wales	24–13
Round 3 – Aug 4		
England	Philippines	28–7
Namibia	Spain	16–10
Australia	Wales	22–14
Round 4 – Aug 5		
England	Namibia	30–10
Wales	Spain	19–13
Australia	Philippines	26–21
Round 5 – Aug 5		
Namibia	Philippines	16–14
Australia	Spain	17–12
England	Wales	18–15

Men's singles championship section B
Round 1 – Aug 3		
Ireland	Scotland	14–12
South Africa	Canada	23–17
New Zealand	Brazil	15–13
Round 2 – Aug 4		
Ireland	South Africa	20–14
New Zealand	Canada	19–15
Scotland	Brazil	27–7
Round 3 – Aug 4		
South Africa	Brazil	22–11
New Zealand	Scotland	27–15
Ireland	Canada	16–10
Round 4 – Aug 5		
Ireland	Brazil	33–7
New Zealand	South Africa	25–16
Canada	Scotland	16–13
Round 5 – Aug 5		
Ireland	New Zealand	19–11
Scotland	South Africa	19–17
Canada	Brazil	20–11
