= 2004 World Outdoor Bowls Championship – Men's pairs =

World bowls event

World Bowls Championship 2004 men's pairs
- 10th World Outdoor Bowls Championships
- Location: Ayr, Scotland
- Date(s): 23 July – 7 August, 2004
- Category: World Bowls Championship

The 2004 World Outdoor Bowls Championship men's pairs was held at the Northfield Bowls Complex in Ayr, Scotland, from 23 July to 7 August 2004.

Keith Roney and Ryan Bester of Canada won the gold medal.

== Qualifying round ==
Four sections, three teams from each section qualify for Championship round.

=== Section 1 ===
Pos	Player	P	W	D	L	F	A	Pts	Diff
1	(Canada) Keith Roney & Ryan Bester	5	4	0	1	103	71	8	+32
2	(Scotland) Alex Marshall & George Sneddon	5	4	0	1	92	71	8	+21
3	(Israel) Aryeh Ben Dor & Colin Silberstein	5	3	0	2	103	74	6	+29
4	(Brazil) Gary Oughton & Patrick Knight	5	2	0	3	91	90	4	+1
5	(Kenya) Eric Langton & Allan Gilham	5	1	0	4	75	97	2	-22
6	(Malaysia) Mohd Afendy Tan Abdullah & Safuan Said	5	1	0	4	55	116	2	-61

=== Section 2 ===
Pos	Player	P	W	D	L	F	A	Pts	Diff
1	(South Africa) Donald Piketh & Gerry Baker	5	4	0	1	117	70	8	+47
2	(Philippines) Damien Allison & Harry Anderson	5	4	0	1	90	83	8	+7
3	(Jersey) Alan Quemard & Derek Boswell	5	3	0	2	101	68	6	+33
4	(United States) Hugh Findlay & Merton Isaacman	5	2	0	3	90	93	4	-3
5	(Eswatini) David Bramley & Mark Svenningsen	5	2	0	3	74	80	4	-6
6	(Norfolk Island) Ian Webb & Ron Campion	5	0	0	5	55	133	0	-78

=== Section 3 ===
Pos	Player	P	W	D	L	F	A	Pts	Diff
1	(Wales) Jason Greenslade & Robert Weale	5	4	0	1	93	70	8	+23
2	(New Zealand) Russell Meyer & Paul Girdler	5	4	0	1	95	79	8	+16
3	(Zimbabwe) Adrien Mellows & Roy Garden	5	3	0	2	98	83	6	+15
4	(Fiji) Semesa Naiseruvati & Caucau Turagabeci	5	3	0	2	96	82	6	+14
5	(Spain) Russell Marks & John Young	5	1	0	4	81	84	2	-3
6	(Samoa) Harry Porter & Iremia Leautuli	5	0	0	5	62	127	0	-65

=== Section 4 ===
Pos	Player	P	W	D	L	F	A	Pts	Diff
1	Noel Graham & Jim Baker	5	4	0	1	99	62	8	+37
2	(Namibia) Douw Calitz & Graham Snyman	5	4	0	1	91	77	8	+14
3	(Hong Kong) Robin Chok & Danny Ho	5	3	1	1	90	71	7	+19
4	(England) John Rednall & Stephen Farish	5	2	0	3	98	85	4	+13
5	(Australia) Brett Duprez & Kevin Walsh	5	1	1	3	92	97	3	-5
6	(Japan) Daisuke Takimura & Junichiro Yoshida	5	0	0	5	46	124	0	-78

== Championship round ==
=== Section 1 ===
Pos	Player	P	W	D	L	F	A	Pts
1	Canada	5	4	0	1	82	81	8
2	Wales	5	3	0	2	102	71	6
3	Zimbabwe	5	3	0	2	78	80	6
4	Hong Kong	5	2	0	3	90	78	4
5	Namibia	5	2	0	3	75	76	4
6	Philippines	5	1	0	4	62	103	2

=== Section 2 ===
Pos	Player	P	W	D	L	F	A	Pts
1	Ireland	5	4	0	1	82	65	8
2	New Zealand	5	4	0	1	83	72	8
3	Scotland	5	3	0	2	105	69	6
4	South Africa	5	3	0	2	79	74	6
5	Israel	5	1	0	4	66	113	2
6	Jersey	5	0	0	5	71	93	0

== Bronze medal match ==
Wales beat New Zealand 15–9.

== Gold medal match ==
Canada beat Ireland 19–15.

== Results ==
Men's pairs qualifying section 1
Round 1 – Jul 24		
Canada	Kenya	29–10
Malaysia	Israel	14–13
Scotland	Brazil	22–12
Round 2 – Jul 24		
Canada	Brazil	20–18
Kenya	Malaysia	27–8
Israel	Scotland	22–15
Round 3 – Jul 25		
Israel	Brazil	22–15
Canada	Malaysia	22–11
Scotland	Kenya	17–15
Round 4 – Jul 25		
Israel	Kenya	27–9
Brazil	Malaysia	29–12
Scotland	Canada	13–12
Round 5 – Jul 26		
Canada	Israel	20–19
Scotland	Malaysia	25–10
Brazil	Kenya	16–14

Men's pairs qualifying section 2
Round 1 – Jul 24		
Philippines	Jersey	21–12
South Africa	Norfolk Island	31–6
United States	(Eswatini) Swaziland	19–13
Round 2 – Jul 24		
Jersey	Norfolk Island	29–8
South Africa	(Eswatini) Swaziland	27–7
Philippines	United States	16–15
Round 3 – Jul 25		
Philippines	South Africa	24–18
(Eswatini) Swaziland	Norfolk Island	22–11
Jersey	United States	29–9
Round 4 – Jul 25		
South Africa	Jersey	20–15
(Eswatini) Swaziland	Philippines	22–7
United States	Norfolk Island	29–12
Round 5 – Jul 26		
Philippines	Norfolk Island	22–18
South Africa	United States	23–18
Jersey	(Eswatini) Swaziland	16–10

Men's pairs qualifying section 3
Round 1 – Jul 24		
New Zealand	Spain	15–10
Wales	Fiji	18–15
Zimbabwe	Samoa	28–11
Round 2 – Jul 24		
New Zealand	Fiji	21–19
Wales	Samoa	22–11
Zimbabwe	Spain	23–14
Round 3 – Jul 25		
Fiji	Spain	19–13
New Zealand	Samoa	25–16
Zimbabwe	Wales	20–13
Round 4 – Jul 25		
Fiji	Samoa	20–17
New Zealand	Zimbabwe	22–14
Wales	Spain	20–12
Round 5 – Jul 26		
New Zealand	Wales	12–20
Fiji	Zimbabwe	23–13
Samoa	Spain	7–32

Men's pairs qualifying section 4
Round 1 – Jul 24		
Namibia	Australia	17–13
Hong Kong	England	18–11
Ireland	Japan	20–4
Round 2 – Jul 24		
England	Australia	28–12
Hong Kong	Japan	25–13
Ireland	Namibia	20–15
Round 3 – Jul 25		
Australia	Japan	34–10
Namibia	England	23–20
Hong Kong	Ireland	15–12
Round 4 – Jul 25		
Ireland	Australia	25–16
England	Japan	27–10
Namibia	Hong Kong	18–15
Round 5 – Jul 26		
Australia	Hong Kong	17–17
Namibia	Japan	18–9
England	Ireland	12–22

Men's pairs championship section A
Round 1 – Jul 26		
Wales	Canada	23–6
Philippines	Namibia	15–12
Zimbabwe	Hong Kong	17–14
Round 2 – Jul 27		
Canada	Philippines	22–14
Zimbabwe	Wales	22–15
Hong Kong	Namibia	15–11
Round 3 – Jul 27		
Canada	Hong Kong	18–16
Namibia	Zimbabwe	21–8
Wales	Philippines	25–9
Round 4 – Jul 28		
Zimbabwe	Philippines	15–13
Canada	Namibia	19–12
Wales	Hong Kong	21–15
Round 5 – Jul 28		
Namibia	Wales	19–18
Hong Kong	Philippines	29–11
Canada	Zimbabwe	17–16

Men's pairs championship section B
Round 1 – Jul 26		
Ireland	South Africa	14–13
Scotland	New Zealand	20–14
Israel	Jersey	18–15
Round 2 – Jul 27		
South Africa	Scotland	15–13
Ireland	Israel	22–10
New Zealand	Jersey	16–15
Round 3 – Jul 27		
South Africa	Jersey	19–17
New Zealand	Israel	22–12
Ireland	Scotland	17–14
Round 4 – Jul 28		
Scotland	Israel	35–11
New Zealand	South Africa	15–13
Ireland	Jersey	17–12
Round 5 – Jul 28		
New Zealand	Ireland	16–12
Scotland	Jersey	23–12
South Africa	Israel	19–15
