= Greg Wilson (bowls) =

Canadian lawn bowler

Personal information
- Nationality: Canadian
- Born: 2 March 1982 (age 44) Oakville, Ontario

Sport
- Sport: Bowls
- Club: Calgary BC
Medal record
Representing Canada
Asia Pacific Bowls Championships
| Bronze medal – third place | 2011 Adelaide | fours |
| Bronze medal – third place | 2019 Gold Coast | fours |

Greg Wilson (born 2 March 1982) is a male international Canadian lawn bowler.

== Caree r ==
Wilson competed in the triples and fours at the 2018 Commonwealth Games held in the Gold Coast, Queensland. Wilson won his second bronze medal in the fours with Rob Law, Pat Bird and Cam Lefresne at the 2019 Asia Pacific Bowls Championships, held in the Gold Coast, Queensland. He had previously won a fours bronze in 2011.

In 2020 he was selected for the 2020 World Outdoor Bowls Championship in Australia.

In 2022, he competed in the men's triples and the men's fours at the 2022 Commonwealth Games.

In 2024, Wilson won the fours title at the Canadian National Bowls Championships. This was his second national title having previously won the pairs in 2015.
