= Margaret Fettes =

Canadian international lawn bowls player

Personal information
- Nationality: Canadian
Medal record
Representing (Canada)
Asia Pacific Bowls Championships
Gold medal – first place	1993 Victoria	fours

Margaret Fettes is a former Canadian international lawn bowler.

== Bowls career ==
Fettes has represented Canada at the Commonwealth Games, in the fours at the 1994 Commonwealth Games.

She won the fours gold medal at the 1993 Asia Pacific Bowls Championships, in Victoria, Canada, with Anita Nivala, Jean Roney and Margaret Richards. She has won two Canadian National titles.

She was a Director for World Bowls from 2003 to 2012.
