= Bradley Robinson (bowls) =

South African lawn bowler

Personal information
- Nationality: South African
- Born: 2 June 1983 (age 43) South Africa

Sport
- Sport: Lawn & indoor bowls
- Club: Bryanston Sports
Medal record
Representing South Africa
National Championships
Gold medal – first place	2023	pairs
Silver medal – second place	2017	singles
Silver medal – second place	2021	singles

Bradley Robinson (born 2 June 1983) is a South African international lawn and indoor bowler.

== Bowls career ==
Robinson came to prominence after twice winning the silver medal at the South African National Bowls Championships in 2017 and 2012 respectively. He won the first silver, bowling for Lynwood BC and was defeated in the final by Wayne Rittmuller and then bowling for Bryanston Sports, he reached the final again in 2021, losing to Niksa Benguric.

Robinson was selected by the South African national team to represent them at the 2022 Commonwealth Games in Birmingham, England. he competed in the men's triples and the wen's fours events.

He finally won a national title, when winning the pairs with Gerry Baker in May 2023.

In August 2023, Robinson was selected by the national team again, to represent them at the sport's blue riband event, the 2023 World Bowls Championship. He participated in the men's triples and the men's fours events.
