= Stewart Davies (bowls) =

Australian bowls player

Personal information
- Nationality: Australia
- Born: 22 April 1955
Medal record
Representing (Australia)
Commonwealth Games
Silver medal – second place	1998 Kuala Lumpur	fours

Stewart Davies (born 1955) is a former Australian international lawn and indoor bowler.

He won a silver medal in the fours with Adam Jeffery, Kevin Walsh and Rex Johnston at the 1998 Commonwealth Games in Kuala Lumpur.
