= Lawn bowls at the 1999 SEA Games =

Lawn bowls competition

Lawn bowls at the 1999 Southeast Asian Games
- Venue: Hassanal Bolkiah National Stadium
- Location: Bandar Seri Begawan, Brunei
- Date: 7 to 15 August 1999

Lawn bowls at the 1999 Southeast Asian Games took place in the Hassanal Bolkiah National Stadium in Bandar Seri Begawan, Brunei from 7 to 15 August 1999.

== Medal table ==
* Host nation (Brunei)

Rank	Nation	Gold	Silver	Bronze	Total
1	Malaysia (MAS)	4	1	1	6
2	Brunei (BRU)*	1	2	3	6
3	Singapore (SIN)	1	2	2	5
4	Thailand (THA)	0	1	0	1
Totals (4 entries)		6	6	6	18

== Medalists ==
=== Men ===
Event	Gold	Silver	Bronze
Singles	Brunei; Pengiran Tengah Tajuddin	Singapore; Chai Hon Yoong	Malaysia; Syed Mohamad Syed Akil
Pairs	Malaysia; Ibrahim Jusoh; Mohamed Tazman Tahir	Brunei; Haji Naim Brahim; Lokman Salleh	Singapore; Irvin Leishman; Robin Tessensohn
Fours	Malaysia; Firdaus Ghuas; Jozaini Johari; Zuraidi Puteh; Sazeli Sani	Brunei; Piut Matris; Mat Rasil Ahmad; Abdul Ghafar Taha; Salleh Awang Hitam	Singapore; Goh Eng Han; Sarbo; George Abraham; Arumugam Samynathan

=== Women ===
Event	Gold	Silver	Bronze
Singles	Singapore; Rosemary Tessensohn	Malaysia; Saedah Abdul Rahim	Brunei; Amalia Matali
Pairs	Malaysia; Siti Zalina Ahmad; Nor Hashimah Ismail	Singapore; Mary Cheah Eok Lim; Yong Yew Foong	Brunei; Mahanim Hussin; Suhana Daud
Fours	Malaysia; Nor Azwa Mohamed Di; Siti Hawa Ali; Bah Chu Mei; Haslah Hassan	Thailand; Anong Gantanant; Vivatana Itipanitong; Jintana Visanuvimoi; Mayuree Healy	Brunei; Sharitah Normah; Siti Aishah Bakar; Lilimaryani Salleh; Rainah Abdul Samat
