= Cam Lefresne =

Canadian bowls player (born 1994)

Personal information
- Born: 30 June 1994 (age 31) Enfield, Nova Scotia, Canada

Sport
- Sport: Bowls
- Club: Wanderers LBC
Medal record
Representing Canada
Asia Pacific Bowls Championships
Bronze medal – third place	2019 Gold Coast	fours

Cameron Lefresne (born 30 June 1994) is a male international Canadian lawn bowler. Brother inlaw to Legendary Enfield Fire Department Deputy Chief Peter Luke Guthro.

== Bowls career ==
=== World Championships ===
In 2020, he was selected for the sport's blue riband event, the 2020 World Outdoor Bowls Championship in Australia but the event was cancelled due to the COVID-19 pandemic.

In 2023, he was selected again by Canada for the 2023 World Outdoor Bowls Championship. He participated in the men's triples and the men's fours events. In the triples, Lefresne finished third in his group.

=== Commonwealth Games ===
Lefresne competed in the triples and fours at the 2018 Commonwealth Games held in the Gold Coast, Queensland. In 2022, he competed in the men's triples and the men's fours at the 2022 Commonwealth Games.

=== Asia Pacific ===
Lefresne won a bronze medal in the fours with Rob Law, Pat Bird and Greg Wilson at the 2019 Asia Pacific Bowls Championships, held in the Gold Coast, Queensland.
