= Pat Bird =

Canadian bowls player

Personal information
- Nationality: Canadian
- Born: 1965 (age 60–61) Calgary, Alberta

Sport
- Sport: Bowls
- Club: Rotary Park LBC; Calgary LBC

Achievements and titles
- Highest world ranking: 23 (November 2025)
Medal record
Representing Canada
Asia Pacific Bowls Championships
Bronze medal – third place	2019 Gold Coast	fours

Pat Bird (born 1965), is a male international Canadian lawn bowler. He reached a career high ranking of world number 34 in July 2025.

== Career ==
Bird won a bronze medal in the fours with Rob Law, Cam Lefresne and Greg Wilson at the 2019 Asia Pacific Bowls Championships, held in the Gold Coast, Queensland.

In 2016, 2022 and 2023, Bird won the singles title at the Canadian National Bowls Championships. The following year in 2024 he secured his 8th national title when winning the triples.
