= Mike Redshaw =

South African lawn and indoor bowler

Personal information
- Nationality: South Africa

Sport
- Club: Italian Club Johannesburg
Medal record
Representing South Africa
Commonwealth Games
Bronze medal – third place	1998 Kuala Lumpur	fours

Mike Redshaw is a former South African international lawn and indoor bowler.

Redshaw won a bronze medal in the fours at the 1998 Commonwealth Games in Kuala Lumpur with Neil Burkett, Bruce Makkink and Robert Rayfield.
