= Mark Gilliland =

Canadian lawn bowler (1949–2023)

Personal information
- Born: February 18, 1949 London Ontario, Canada
- Died: August 10, 2023 (aged 74) Myrtle Beach, South Carolina, US
Medal record
Representing (Canada)
Asia Pacific Bowls Championships
Bronze medal – third place	1987 Lae	triples
Gold medal – first place	1993 Victoria	pairs

Mark Gilliand (February 18, 1949 – August 10, 2023) was an international lawn bowler from Canada.

== Bowls career ==
Gilliland has represented Canada at the Commonwealth Games, in the singles at the 1994 Commonwealth Games.

He won two medals at the Asia Pacific Bowls Championships including a gold medal in the pairs at the 1993 event in Victoria.

He is the five times Canadian lawn bowling singles champion (1983, 1991, 1992, 1993, 1995).
