= Sharon Glenn =

Personal information
- Nationality: South African

Sport
- Club: Bedfordview BC
Medal record
Representing (South Africa)
Atlantic Bowls Championships
Gold medal – first place	2005 Bangor	pairs

Sharon Glenn is a South African international lawn bowler.

== Bowls career ==
Glenn has represented South Africa at the Commonwealth Games, in the pairs event (with Jill Hackland) at the 1998 Commonwealth Games.

She won a pairs gold medal with Esme Steyn, at the 2005 Atlantic Bowls Championships in Bangor.

In 2012, she finished runner-up to Esme Steyn in the singles at the South African National Bowls Championships.
