= Jason Evans (bowls) =

South African lawn bowler

Personal information
- Nationality: South African
- Born: 6 December 1971 (age 54) Neath, Wales
- Occupation: self employed

Sport
- Sport: Lawn bowls
- Club: Morningside Country Club
- Partner: Louise Evans

Achievements and titles
- Highest world ranking: 45 (October 2024)
Medal record
Representing South Africa
Men's lawn bowls
Atlantic Bowls Championships
Gold medal – first place	2019 Cardiff	triples
World Bowls Indoor Championships
Bronze medal – third place	2025 Aberdeen	singles
National Championships
Silver medal – second place	2013	fours
Gold medal – first place	2021	pairs
Silver medal – second place	2022	singles

Jason Evans (born 1971) in Neath, Wales, is a South African lawn bowler.

== Bowls career ==
He competed in the pairs and fours at the 2014 Commonwealth Games and was selected as part of the South Africa team for the 2018 Commonwealth Games on the Gold Coast in Queensland. 2022 Commonwealth Games Birmingham

He finished runner-up in the 2013 fours at the National Championships bowling for the Belgravia Bowls Club.

In 2019 he won the triples gold medal at the Atlantic Bowls Championships and in 2020, he was selected for the 2020 World Outdoor Bowls Championship in Australia but the event was cancelled due to the COVID-19 pandemic.

In 2021, he won the men's pairs title at the South African National Bowls Championships. In 2022, he competed in the men's singles and the men's triples at the 2022 Commonwealth Games.

In 2023, he was selected as part of the team to represent South Africa at the 2023 World Outdoor Bowls Championship. He participated in the men's triples and the men's fours events.

After winning the 2024 South African national indoor singles he subsequently won the bronze medal at the 2025 World Bowls Indoor Championships in Aberdeen.
