= 1984 World Indoor Bowls Championship =

Bowls championship held in Coatbridge, North Lanarkshire

World Indoor Championships 1984
- 6th World Indoor Bowls Championships
- Location: (Scotland) Coatbridge, North Lanarkshire
- Date: 7–12 February 1984
- Category: World Indoor Championships

The 1984 Embassy World Indoor Bowls Championship was held at the Coatbridge indoor bowling club, North Lanarkshire, Scotland, 7–12 February 1984.
Jim Baker won the title beating Nigel Smith in the final 21–18.

== Men's singles ==
First round
(Northern Ireland) Jim Baker | 21
(Australia) Kenny Williams | 7
(Scotland) Jim Boyle | 21
(Jersey) John Jones | 9
(Scotland) Bob Sutherland | 21
(Northern Ireland) Sammy Allen | 16
(England) Cliff Simpson | 21
(Hong Kong) Edwin Chok | 9
(England) Nigel Smith | 21
(Guernsey) Tom Beattie | 8
(Scotland) Willie Wood | 21
(Canada) Dave Brown | 15
(England) David Bryant | 21
(Wales) Terry Sullivan | 17
(Northern Ireland) David Corkill | 21
(New Zealand) Ian Dickison | 13

Quarter-finals
(Scotland) Baker | 21
(Scotland) Boyle | 15
(Scotland) Sutherland | 21
(England) Simpson | 10
(England) Smith | 21
(Scotland) Wood | 18
(England) Bryant | 21
(Northern Ireland) Corkill | 20

Semi-finals
(Northern Ireland) Baker | 21
(Scotland) Sutherland | 14
(England) Smith | 21
(England) Bryant | 15

Final
(Northern Ireland) Baker | 21
(England) Smith | 18
