= Jim Baker (bowls) =

Northern Irish former bowler

Personal information
- Nationality: British (Northern Irish)
- Born: 18 February 1958 (age 68) Belfast, Northern Ireland

Sport
- Club: Cliftonville BC; Ballymena BC
Medal record
Representing Ireland
World Outdoor Championships
Gold medal – first place	1984 Aberdeen	triples
Gold medal – first place	1988 Auckland	fours
Gold medal – first place	2004 Ayr	fours
Silver medal – second place	2004 Ayr	pairs
Bronze medal – third place	2004 Ayr	team
Representing Northern Ireland
World Indoor Championships
Gold medal – first place	1984 Coatbridge	singles
Commonwealth Games
Silver medal – second place	1990 Auckland	fours
Bronze medal – third place	2002 Manchester	fours

Jim Baker is a former Northern Irish international lawn and indoor bowler.

== Bowls career ==
Baker won the 1984 World Indoor Bowls Championship, becoming the first and to date only open champion from Northern Ireland. He was also runner-up in 1982.

Baker was part of the gold medal-winning triples for the combined Irish team in the 1984 World Outdoor Bowls Championship and gold medal-winning fours in the 1988 World Outdoor Bowls Championship. He won a silver with Northern Ireland at the 1990 Commonwealth Games in Auckland, New Zealand.

In the 2004 World Championship, he won a third gold medal for the combined Irish team in the fours with Jonathan Ross, Noel Graham and Neil Booth and a silver medal with Noel Graham in the pairs during the 2004 World Outdoor Bowls Championship.

In addition, he won another Commonwealth Games medal at the 2002 Games in Manchester.

At national level, he also won the 1989 Irish National Bowls Championships singles, bowling for Cliftonville Bowls Club.
