= Bowls Canada =

Governing body for the sport of lawn bowls in Canada

- Sport: Bowls
- Jurisdiction: Canada
- Founded: 1932
- Affiliation: World Bowls
- Location: Ottawa, Ontario
- CEO: Britany Gordon

Official website
- bowlscanada.com/en/
- (Canada)

Bowls Canada is the governing body for the sport of bowls in Canada. The organization is responsible for the promotion and development of lawn bowls in Canada, and is affiliated with the world governing body World Bowls.

The organization arranges tournaments such as men's and women's Canadian National Bowls Championships, with competition in the bowls disciplines of singles, pairs and fours/rinks. There are ten Provincial Associations which make up Bowls Canada.

== History ==
Bowls in the Canada is believed to have started in 1734 following the laying of a green by the Garrison of Nova Scotia in Annapolis Royal, Nova Scotia. The Caer Howell Club was established in 1832 and the first Province to organise itself was Ontario, with the formation of the Ontario Bowling Association in 1888. The Manitoba Lawn Bowling Association was formed in 1907.

Five men from Toronto formed the Dominion Lawn Bowling Association (DLBA) in 1924, consisting of six Provinces. In 1930 the first ever Commonwealth Games (the Empire Games as it was known then) took place in Hamilton, Ontario, and featured bowls as a core sport.

During April 1932, a man called Alfred Langford was instrumental in helping transform the DLBA into the Canadian Lawn Bowling Council, which later became the Canadian Lawn Bowling Association (CLBA). The Canadian National Bowls Championships were introduced in 1954.

In 1983, the CLBA and Women's National Associations merged to create Lawn Bowls Canada LBC and in 1999, LBC became the name used today, Bowls Canada.

== See also ==
- Canadian National Bowls Championships
- Sport in Canada
