= Wayne Roberts (bowls) =

South African lawn bowler

Personal information
- Born: c.1989 South Africa

Sport
- Sport: Lawn & indoor bowls
- Club: Hillcrest BC

Achievements and titles
- Highest world ranking: 4 (October 2024)
Medal record
Representing South Africa
African States Tournament
Gold medal – first place	2023	singles
Gold medal – first place	2023	triples
National Championships
Gold medal – first place	2023	fours
Gold medal – first place	2024	singles

Wayne Roberts (born 1989) is a South African international lawn and indoor bowler. He reached a career high ranking of world number 4 in October 2024.

== Bowls career ==
Roberts came to prominence in 2023, after winning the men's fours title at the National Championships, bowling for Stella Park BC, where he teamed up with Doug Bashford, Roger Boulle and Nick Horne.

Roberts was selected by the South African national team to represent them at the African States Tournament in June 2023, where he made his international debut. He won the gold medal in the singles and the triples.

In 2024, Roberts won the singles title at the National championships bowling for Hillcrest BC, which propelled him to a world ranking of 10 and he was subsequently selected for the national team at the 2024 African States Tournament in Botswana.
