= Lynne Lindsay-Payne =

Namibian lawn bowler

Personal information
- Nationality: Namibia
- Born: 23 April 1951 (age 75) Namibia
Medal record
Representing Namibia
Commonwealth Games
Silver medal – second place	1998 Kuala Lumpur	pairs

Lynne Lindsay-Payne is a former international lawn bowls competitor for Namibia.

In 1998 she won a silver medal at the 1998 Commonwealth Games in the pairs with Cathelean du Plessis.

She was married to fellow Namibian bowls player Malcolm Lindsay-Payne.
