= Cathelean du Plessis =

South African lawn bowler

Personal information
- Nationality: Namibian
- Born: 9 December 1941 (age 84) South Africa
Medal record
Representing Namibia
Commonwealth Games
Silver medal – second place	1998 Kuala Lumpur	pairs
Atlantic Bowls Championships
Bronze medal – third place	1993 Florida	pairs

Cathelean Marie du Plessis is a South African born, former international lawn bowls competitor for Namibia.

== Bowls career ==
In 1993, she won the pairs bronze medal with Anne Ainsworth, at the inaugural Atlantic Bowls Championships.

In 1998 she won a silver medal at the 1998 Commonwealth Games in the pairs with Lynne Lindsay-Payne.
