= Mandy Jacklin =

British lawn bowler (born 1966)

Mandy Jacklin (née Brundle)
Personal information
- Nationality: British (English)
- Born: Q4.1966 Greater London, England

Sport
- Club: Peterborough & District
Medal record
Representing England
Commonwealth Games
Bronze medal – third place	1998 Kuala Lumpur	fours

Samanda Jacklin (née Brundle) better known as Mandy is a former English international lawn bowler.

In 1998 she represented England at the 1998 Commonwealth Games at the 1998 Commonwealth Games in Kuala Lumpur and won a bronze medal in the fours event with Norma Shaw, Catherine Anton and Shirley Page.

Under her maiden name of Mandy Brundle she won a national champion title in the fours, representing Huntingdonshire.
