= South African National Bowls Championships =

National Lawn bowls event

Tournament information
- Sport: Lawn bowls
- Location: South Africa
- Established: 1897
- Administrator: Bowls South Africa
- Website: Bowls South Africa

The South African National Bowls Championships is organised by Bowls South Africa (BSA). The first National Singles Championships were held in 1897 in Kimberley despite the fact that the South African Bowls Association was not formed until 1904.

The Rinks was first held in 1906 at Kimberley. The winner received the Pyott Cup and runner-up the Dewar Shield (until 1927 when the Dewar Shield was renamed the Sir David Harris Cup). The event was not held during the Second World War and when it returned in 1948, it featured a squad of up to five players.

== Men's events ==
=== Singles ===
Year	Champion	Runner-Up	Ref
1897	F Wightman (Kimberley)		
1898	James Watson (Gardens)	G Hankinson (Gardens)	
1899	W H Smith (Kimberley)	J Johnston (Gardens)	
1903	J P Williamson (Kimberley)	R Sumner (Kimberley)	
1904	J F Thomson (Port Elizabeth)	D Byrne (Kimberley)	
1905	George Roulston (Kimberley)	H Parkin (Port Elizabeth)	
1906	R Sumner (Kimberley)	D Byrne (Kimberley)	
1907	J F Thomson (Port Elizabeth)	J Bauchop (Pretoria)	
1908	F Wightman (Kimberley)	R Rosser (Gardens)	
1909	S B Malcolm (Pretoria)	A H Stirrat (Johannesburg)	
1910	J Bauchop (Pretoria)	J F Gough (Victoria Park)	
1911	J Roxburgh (Gardens)	J Farish (Port Elizabeth)	
1912	James Gilbert (Port Elizabeth)	R Sumner (Kimberley)	
1913	R Paterson (Johannesburg)	D Watson (Durban)	
1914	W Paterson (Johannesburg)	T A Duncan (East London)	
1919	J Johnson (Green & Sea Point)	W Lester (Wynberg)	
1920	R W Boyd (Kimberley Mine)	A W T Downie (Pretoria)	
1921	A G Webber (Berea)	J A Stewart (Maritzburg East)	
1922	T McMurray (Kensington)	R Sumner (Kimberley Mine)	
1923	T McMurray (Kensington)	J A Stewart (Maritzburg East)	
1924	J G Donaldson (Brakpan)	D Cuthbert (Crown Mines)	
1925	H J Matthew (Boskburg)	C Marr (New Modder)	
1926	J E Miller (Grahamstown)	C J Crawford (Rondebosch)	
1927	H J Matthew (Boskburg)	A J Ogg (Port Elizabeth)	
1928	A Kopel (Boskburg)	D Sneddon (Stadium)	
1929	L Sewell (Plumstead)	W McCracken (Liesbeck Park)	
1930	F Stevenson (Brakpan)	W Gibb (Kimberley Mine)	
1931	J Steel (Brakpan)	H S Walters (Wanderers)	
1932	N Foulds (Camps Bay)	A McMillan (Berea)	
1933	John Southern (Stadium)	H Oldbury (Kensington)	
1934	John Southern (Stadium)	C A Proudfoot (Observatory)	
1935	W F Keppler (Maritzburg Railway)	J Clark (Bloemfontein)	
1936	J G Donaldson (Brakpan)	S Young (West Rand Cons.)	
1937	Horace Harvey (Brakpan)	J Henderson (Maritzburg)	
1938	J Thomson (Durban Prisons)	W Eaton (Rondebosch)	
1939	Tony Willmott (Durban Deep)	Norman Snowy Walker (Pretoria West)	
1940	Gert Fourie (Parys)	W Davidson (Pretoria)	
1948	C Marshall (S.A Lands)	S S Paterson (Durban)	
1949	G Jacobs (Berea Park)	H J van Zyl (Green & Sea Point)	
1950	T Winter (Wit. Knights)	F Matthews (Silverton)	
1951	I G Moir (Berea)	O V Gillman (V.F.P Johannesburg)	
1952	Herbert Currer (Pretoria West)	C K Crossman (Kroonstad)	
1953	Arthur Saunders (East London Railway)	H C Dyer (Silverton)	
1954	Norman Snowy Walker (Pretoria West)	D E Singer (Stella Park)	
1955	E C "Eddie" Hillier (Klipbank)	Herbert Currer (Pretoria West)	
1956	H J van Zyl (Pinelands)	A I MacNamara (Robinson Deep)	
1957	Pinky Danilowitz (Kadimah)	E Lyttle (Mowbray)	
1958	M D Vilettaz (Pretoria)	R A Coats (Old Edwardians)	
1959	Norman Snowy Walker (Pretoria West)	Bill Stead (Balfour Park)	
1960	Douglas Anderson (Durban CC)	Ray Ferguson	
1961	Norman Snowy Walker (Pretoria West)	Harold Eaton (Johannesburg)	
1962	Kelvin Lightfoot (Westmorepark)	Rudolph van Vuuren (Westmorepark)	
1963	Hugh Lobban (Wanderers)	Kelvin Lightfoot (Westmorepark)	
1964	Gert "Blackie" Swart (Roodepoort)	Pinky Danilowitz (Kadimah)	
1965	Norman Snowy Walker (Pretoria West)	Noel Spence-Ross (Roosevelt Park)	
1966	Basil Wells (Pretoria West)	Tommy Harvey (Belgravia)	
1967	Brian Ellwood (Berea Park)	Bert Stanley (Stella Park)	
1968	Kelvin Lightfoot (Westmorepark)	Rudolph van Vuuren (Westmorepark)	
1969	Peter Wilson (Pretoria)	Ernie Harvey (Roodepoort)	
1971	Edgar Davey (Florida, West Transvaal)	Cecil Bransky (Balfour Park, South Transvaal)	
1972	Cecil Bransky (Balfour Park, South Transvaal)		
1973	Teddy Miller (Balfour Park)	Nando Gatti (Olympics)	
1974	Kevin Campbell (CBC Pretoria)	Stan Greenwood (Ridge Park)	
1975	Doug Watson (Springwood)	David Pelkowitz (Beaconsfield)	
1977	Dennis Rayfield (Olympics)	Kelvin Lightfoot (Westmorepark)	
1982	Neal Burkett (Westview)	Fred Wilson (Walmer)	
1983	Lex Morton (Florida)	Bill Moseley (Ridge Park)	
1984	Bill Moseley (Ridge Park)	Tony Waters (Kyalami CC)	
1985	Dennis Grainger (Mowbray)	Doug Watson (Springwood)	
1986	Kevin Campbell (PHSOB)	Frans du Plessis (Pretoria Prison Services)	
1987	Nino Oberto (Bedfordview)	Cyril Lahana (George Lea Park)	
1988	Kevin Kobusch (DHSOB)	Rob Owlsley (Langholm)	
1989	Kevin Kobusch (DHSOB)		
1990	David Poultney (Ladybrand)		
1991	Cliffie Kay		
1992	Ashley van Winkel (Constantia)	Stan Brown (Wanderers)	
1994	Kevin Kobusch (DHSOB)	Clive Webb (Grifo)	
1996	Keith Rees-Gibbs (Benoni Municipals)		
2006	Wayne Perry (Bloemfontein Municipals)		
2009	Wayne Perry (Bloemfontein Municipals)	Reagan Jacobus (Westville)	
2010	Bruce Makkink (R.D.L.I)	Hertzog Meiring (BFN)	
2011	Bruce Makkink (R.D.L.I)	Andrew Barrow (Delville Germiston)	
2012	Arthur Langley (Somerset East)	Willie Kilian (Walmer)	
2013	Bobby Donnelly (Wanderers)	Francois Koen (Wingate Park)	
2014	Morgan Muvhango (Discovery)	Billy Radloff (George)	
2015	Rudi Jacobs (Parys)	Thinus Oelofse (Brakpan Mines)	
2016	Kenny Kyriacou (PHSOB)	Joel Roebert (WPCC)	
2017	Wayne Rittmuller (Stella Park)	Bradley Robinson (Lynwood)	
2018	Wayne Rittmuller (Stella Park)	Joel Roebert (Mowbray)	
2019	Grant George (Lekkerbreek)	Wayne York (Ramblers)	
2020	cancelled due to COVID-19 pandemic		
2021	Niksa Benguric (Wingate Park)	Bradley Robinson (Bryanston Sports)	
2022	Shaun Thomas (Roosevelt Park)	Jason Evans (Morningside CC)	
2023	Paul White (Westville)	Jason Evans (Morningside CC)	
2024	Wayne Roberts (Hillcrest)	Paul White (Westville)	
2025	Brendan Ferns (Wingate Park)	Wayne Perry (Wingate Park)	

=== Pairs ===
Year	Champion	Runner-Up	Ref
1959	Kelvin Lightfoot		
1971	Doug Watson (Springwood)		
2009	Bobby Donnelly & Shaun Lotter (Johannesburg Northern Suburbs)	Dawie Nell & Philip Bailey (CCB Old Boys)	
2010	Clinton Ingliis, Graham Turner, Chris Scaife (Westville)	Gidion Vermeulen & Gawie Lessing (Westville)	
2011	Daniel Loubser & Joel Roebert (WPCC)	Wayne York, Louis Heyns (BFN Municipals)	
2012	Billy Radloff & Japie Combrink (George)	Nick Rusling & Louis Fourie (Discovery)	
2013	Robin Ashby & Thomas Minnie, (Harlequins)	Dylon Stafford & Shaun Nell (Wanderers JHBG)	
2014	Joel Roebert & Robin Gibbs (WPCC)	Tony van der Poel & David Pillay (Milnerton)	
2015	Robby Piketh & Theo van der Walt (Edgemead)	Adrian Rakic & Michael Mashabela (Dunkeld)	
2016	Robby Piketh & Theo van der Walt (Edgemead)	Gerry Baker & Kepler Wessels (Belgravia)	
2017	Morgan Muvhango & Wilson Malobolo (The Nest)	Pierre Breitenbach & Carl Smit (Potchefstroom Town)	
2018	Gawie du Toit & Tinus Crous (Correctional Services)	Alexander Miller & Tommy Potgieter (Stella Park)	
2019	Brendan Ferns & Andre Rousseau & Ernst Wagner (Wingate Park)	Gerald May & Gordon May (Edenvale)	
2020	cancelled due to COVID-19 pandemic		
2021	Jason Evans & Luan Cronje (Roosevelt Park)	Wayne Roberts & Deon Audie (Stella Park)	
2022	Wayne Rittmuller & Jason Lott (Hillary)	Brendan Ferns & Andre Rousseau (Wingate Park)	
2023	Bradley Robinson & Gerry Baker (Morningside CC)	Jason Evans & John Ingram (Morningside CC)	
2024	Wilson Malobolo & Prince Neluonde (Bryanston Sports)	Otto Holicki & Warren Steyn (Linden)	
2025	Billy Radloff & John Rimbault (Knysna)	Mike Underwood & Logan Subramony (Comrades)	

=== Fours/rinks ===
Year	Champion	Runner-Up	Ref
1906	Kimberley Mine		
1907	Gardens, Cape Town	Kimberley	
1908	Johannesburg	Johannesburg & Gardnes	
1909	Gardens, Cape Town	Kimberley	
1910	Port Elizabeth+	Kimberley Mine+	
1911	Johannesburg	Johannesburg	
1912	Kimberley Mine	Maritzburg	
1913	Johannesburg	Wynberg, Cape Town	
1914	Kimberley Mine	Kimberley Mine	
1919	Wynberg, Cape Town	East Rand Proprietary Mines	
1920	Boskburg	Kimberley Mine	
1921	Brakpan Mines	Brakpan Mines	
1922	Mowbray, Cape Town	Boksburg	
1923	Durban	Port Elizabeth	
1924	Green & Sea Point	Green & Sea Point	
1925	Kimberley Mine	State Mines	
1926	Crown Mines	Kimberley Mine	
1927	Observatory, Cape Town	Crown Mines	
1928	Johannesburg	Kensington	
1929	Kimberley Mine	Crown Mines	
1930	Stadium	Boksburg	
1931	Maritzburg East	Berea	
1932	Pretoria City	Hoy Park	
1933	K and A E Railway	Brakpan	
1934	Observatory	Orangia	
1935	Pretoria West	Brakpan	
1936	Brakpan	Kimberley Mine	
1937	Grahamstown	Brakpan Mine	
1938	Durban	East Rand Proprietary Mines	
1939	Southern Suburbs	Berea Park	
1940	Mowbray	Kimberley Mine	
1948	Norman Snowy Walker, D D Reich, Herbert Currer, Y Sinclair, R Sinclair (Pretoria West)	J Lindsay, S S Paterson, J Keir, A F T Whyte, John Anderson (Durban)	
1949	J S Anderson, J Lindsay, G W Grose, A F T Whyte, John Anderson (Durban)	J F A Oordt, A F Lawson, W Millican, V Beagley, E E Kahn (Wanderers)	
1950	W G Lavington, M T Phillips, Tommy Press, Frank Mitchell, P C Burnley (Pretoria)	W Jackson, R Bayne, H Price, G M Fullerton, I Grant (Johannesburg)	
1951	Wilfred Randall, C Williams, J N Pearce, H B Williams, J McMillan (Kensington)	Norman Snowy Walker, Herbert Currer, Y Sinclair, R Sinclair, R B Dunlop (Pretoria West)	
1952	Frank Mitchell, M D Vilettaz, J F G Slattery, P C Burnley, P A Street (Pretoria)	E McElroy, W A Thompson, J Taylor, C W Whiting, J P Zietsman (Regent)	
1953	C A Proudfoot, H C Millar, A A Robb, D C A Begg, A F Buchanan (Rondebosch)	W S Snowden, D A Walker, D W Norris, L Glover, A F J Hayes, A V Smith (Hoy Park)	
1954	Norman Snowy Walker, Herbert Currer, Y Sinclair, H Rynners, J Campbell (Pretoria West)	W May, J Henderson, C Perry, W J James (Ridgeview)	
1955	W Atkinson, N McPhail, H E Bell, A P Murray, C de V Thompson (Chamber of Mines)	Tommy Press, C G Barnard, W Rodd, J A Tennant, A Mattison (Roodepoort)	
1956	John Myrdal, C E Elsworth, C R Corbishley, A H Rider, D S Keggie (Sherwood)	Wilfred Randall, J N Pearce, H B Williams, J Rayner, C B Hubbard (Kensington)	
1957	Edward Stuart, G A Dixon, C Wilson, A Green, J Chadwick (Observatory)	F Black, G Templer, A Sharwood, H Beyers, L Ward (Humewood)	
1958	M D Vilettaz, Frank Mitchell, M C Leslie, P C Burnley, P T J Wilson (Pretoria)	D A Adamson, J W Trevorrow, W G Funston, W Bell, A Horwitz (Brooklyn)	
1962	Kelvin Lightfoot		
1968	Doug Watson (Springwood)		
1971	P. Ravenna, Bill Moseley, R. Wood, G. Walker, H. Boon (Ridge Park)		
1972	F. Golding, T. Hall, M. Vey, A.McClymont, J. Bull (Germiston)		
1975	Nando Gatti		
2009	Ronnie Palmer (Potchefstroom)	Theo van der Walt (Discovery)	
2010	Nic Russling, Mervyn Lynn, John Bedford-Owen, Louis Fourie (Discovery)	Clinton Bisset, Robbie Johnston, Gary Moffat, Deon Maritz (Bluff)	
2011	Bruce Makkink, Colin Best, Andrew Caldwell, Kerry Gilder (RDLI)	Gerry Baker, Bill Moseley, Johnnie Pieterse, Dave Renaud (Belgravia)	
2012	Robin Ashby, Dawie Nel, Willem van Niekerk, Thomas Minnie (Harlequins)	Billy Radloff, Japie Combrink, Piet Lourens, Peter Hufkie (George)	
2013	Pierre Breitenbach, Pikkie Abbott, Jakkals Mouton, Smithie Smit (Potchefstroom Town)	Gerry Baker, Jason Evans, Kepler Wessels, Johnnie Pieterse (Belgravia)	
2014	Duanne Abrahams, Des Day, Allen Rowe, Martin Lewis (Bedfordview)	Gary Roach, Ghanie Pick, Enricko Lombard, Jaco Koegelenberg (SANDF)	
2015	Robby Piketh, Theo van der Walt, Tony O’Reilly, Chas O'Reilly (Edgemead)	Francois Koen, Tommy Jamie, Basil Le Grange, Bernardus van der Spuy (Wingate Park)	
2016	Theuns Fraser, Mike Marnewick, Morgan Muvhango, Wilson Malobolo (The Nest)	Dave Riley, Louis Tolmay, Joe Marais, Daniel Taljaard (Umhlali)	
2017	Francois Koen, Tommy Jamie, Jaco du Preez, Bernardus van der Spuy (Wingate Park)	Kenny Kyriacou, Nico Boezart, Robert Parsons, Cobus Britz (PHSOB)	
2018	Hennie Slabbert, Gary Vermaak, Hilton Cherry, Shaun Cherry (The Woods)	Charles Joyce, Duncan Spence-Ross, Francois Steyn, Paolo Vitali (Knysna)	
2019	Jake Ireland, Ian Ireland, Haig Randall, Barry Ireland (Jeppe Quondam)	Craig Rimmington, Cecil Behrens, Wade Ferguson, Willem Giesing (Brakpan Mines)	
2020	cancelled due to COVID-19 pandemic		
2021	Mike O'Connor Snr, Dylan Mitchell, Garth Wait, Buks Botma (Pretoria Municipals)	Ferdie Jansen, Andre Meyer, Jaco Diedericks, Andre Human (Rustenburg Impala)	
2022	Wilson Malobolo, Prince Neluonde, Ian Mckenzie, Greg Valjalo, Kelvine Theunis (Bryanston Sports)	Greg Burns, David Nel, Gordon May, Matthew Phiri (Edenvale)	
2023	Wayne Roberts, Doug Bashford, Roger Boulle, Nick Horne (Stella Park)	Niksa Benguric, Dylan Mitchell, Pieter Fourie, Stevan Scott	
2024	Brian Dail, Gavin Erasmus, Gianni Gatti, Alan Gordon (Bedfordview)	Jason Evans, Shaum Thomas, Robby Piketh, Donald Piketh (Morningside CC)	
2025	Niksa Benguric, Charles Mathewson, Wayne Perry, Driann van Niekerk (Wingate Park)	Paul White, Doug Bashford, Arnold Muscat, Roger Boulle (Westville)	

== Women's events ==
=== Singles ===
Year	Champion	Runner-Up	Ref
2010	Cheryl Mostert (Ladysmith)	Heather Phelan (Collegians)	
2011	Esme Steyn (Linden)	Louise Larkin (RDLI)	
2012	Esme Steyn (Linden)	Sharon Glenn (Bedfordview)	
2013	Jill Hackland (Umhlali)	Maria Dreyer (Northlands)	
2014	Nici Neal (Leases)	Nan Roos (Dundee)	
2015	Trish Young (WPCC)	Linda Stringer (Constantia)	
2016	Nici Neal (Leases)	Sue Tarr (Harlequins)	
2017	Loraine Victor (Wingate Park)	Elma Davis (George)	
2018	Esme Kruger (CBCOB)	Hana Gevers (Dundee)	
2019	Lourenza van der Merwe (Western Suburbs)	Bridget Calitz (Leases)	
2020	cancelled due to COVID-19 pandemic		
2021	Esme Haley (Linden)	Nici Neal (Leases)	
2022	Ina Fourie (CBCOB)	Helen Jansen (Rustenburg)	
2023	Charlotte Rossouw (Henley on Klip)	Sue Tarr (Harlequins)	
2024	Anneke Scheepers (Goodwood)	Sylvia Burns (Mowbray)	
2025	Bridget Herselman (Leases)	Leila Snyman (Krugersdorp)	

=== Pairs ===
Year	Champion	Runner-Up	Ref
2010	Antoinette Jacobs & Tracy Meyeridricks (Bryanston Sports)	Loraine Victor, Esme Kruger (Wingate Park)	
2011	Patricia Stallwood & Margaretha Thomas (Durbanville)	Glenda Matthews & Bronwyn Webber (RDLI)	
2012	Tracy Meyeridricks & Charlotte Rossouw (Bryanston Sports)	Glenda Matthews & Bronwyn Webber (RDLI)	
2013	Tracy Meyeridricks & Charlotte Rossouw (Bryanston Sports)	Nan Roos & Hanna Gevers (Vryheid)	
2014	Rika Lynn, Ute Smith (Discovery)	Susan Nel & Anette de Wet (Rustenberg Impala)	
2015	Nan Roos & Noela Dreyer (Dundee)	Rosa Tunstead & Ilda Forbes (Walmer)	
2016	Elma Davis & Arlene Bosse (George) (EDB)	Tracy Meyeridricks & Charlotte Rossouw (Bryanston Sports)	
2017	Anita Groenewald & Sylvia Burns (Edgemead)	Sue Tarr & Liette Jordaan Van Zyl (Harlequins)	
2018	Colleen Piketh & Elma Davis (George)	Nan Roos & Noela Dreyer (Dundee)	
2019	Sue Tarr & Liette Jordaan Van Zyl (Harlequins)	Nan Roos & Noela Dreyer (Dundee)	
2020	cancelled due to COVID-19 pandemic		
2021	Colleen Piketh & Thabelo Muvhango (Discovery)	Esme Kruger & Trudie le Grange (CBCOB)	
2022	Nan Roos & Jenny Raymond (Hartenbos)	Sheila Smith & Beata Coetzer (Alberton)	
2023	Heather Pembroke & Esme Haley (Linden)	Taz Bright & Colleen Marshall (Mowbray/Constantia)	
2024	Heather Pembroke & Thabelo Muvhango (Ferndale)	Esme Kruger & Lara York (Hartenbos)	
2025	Anneke Scheepers & Megan Ferreira (Goodwood)	Claudette Mostert & Verinia Gardiner (Benoni)	

=== Fours ===
Year	Champion	Runner-Up	Ref
2010	Ellen Cawker, Marthie Pringle, Lenie Geyer, Maureen Muller (Margate)	Loraine Victor, Ina Jooste, Esme Kruger, Arlene Neukircher (Wingate Park)	
2011	Kobie Stander, Denise Westerveld, Dora Vosloo, Helen Proctor (Margate)	Nanette Roos, Yvonne Steenkamp, Hanna Gevers, Noela Dreyer (Vryheid)	
2012	Loraine Victor, Esme Kruger, Vicky Frost, Jean Erasmus (Wingate Park)	Sheila Buncombe, Eileen Burt, Sylvia Joubert, Trish Watling (Edenvale)	
2013	Elma Davis, Maureen Muller, Theuna Grobler, Rozanne Rossouw (George)	Lolly Reed, Estelle Hamblin, Wilna Gouws, Liese Hayward (Western Suburbs)	
2014	Elma Davis, Maureen Muller, Arlene Bosse, Jenny Raymand (George)	Linda van der Berg, Tracy Herrigton, Dawn Vosloo, Di Smith (Belgravia)	
2015	Elma Davis, Maureen Muller, Arlene Bosse, Jenny Raymond (George)	Cheery Ann Mills, Mary Barnard, Walda Gary, Vanessa Herron (Boksburg)	
2016	Nici Neal, Lynne Marnewick, Debbie Peruca, Karen Gerber (Leases)	Nan Roos, Sylvia Malan, Noela Dreyer, Essel Schoeman (Dundee)	
2017	Maggie van Zyl, Rene Swanepoel, Lydia Maritz, Margaret Thomas (Durbanville)	Marina Brink, Trysie Jute, Julie van der Westhuizen, Rona Grobler (Gordons Bay)	
2018	Loraine Victor, Jean Erasmus, Gillian Bingham, Rea Potgieter (Wingate Park)	Cherry-Ann Mills, Tracy Graham, Eileen Frame, Ronwen Monoyoudis (Boksburg)	
2019	Patricia Tiltmann, Nola Warner, Jane Bursey, Jayne Minnie (Old Selbornians)	Annette Dimant, Claire Turner, Dot Savage, Jenny Eagar (Bryanston Sports)	
2020	cancelled due to COVID-19 pandemic		
2021	Esme Kruger, Ina Fourie, Trudie le Grange, Rolinda Fourie (CBCOB)	Sega Mokoto, Baby Mojanaga, Rhonda Kallis, Natasha Kallis (Potchefstroom)	
2022	Sue Tarr, Liette Jordaan-van Zyl, Chantal Nell, Leone Du Rand (Harlequins)	Dezi Rosenblatt, Desire Vermaak, Charlene Colyn, Lanell Cherry (The Woods)	
2023	Jacqui Janse van Rensburg, Emma Murphy, Francesca Baleri, Shannon Davies	Michele Schliesser, Esme Murphy, Joyce Erasmus, Hayley Erasmus	
2024	Tracy Meyeridricks, Taz Bright, Colleen Marshall, Charlotte Rossouw (Henley on Klip)	Esme Kruger, Lara York, Nan Roos, Rolinda Fourie (Hartenbos)	
2025	Tracy Meyeridricks, Taz Bright, Colleen Marshall, Charlotte Rossouw (Henley on Klip)	Esme Kruger, Lara York, Ina Fourie, Rolinda Fourie (Hartenbos)	
