= Niksa Benguric =

South African lawn bowler

Personal information
- Nationality: South African
- Born: 17 September South Africa

Sport
- Sport: Lawn & indoor bowls
- Club: Wingate Park BC

Achievements and titles
- Highest world ranking: 28 (October 2024)
Medal record
Representing South Africa
African States Tournament
Gold medal – first place	2023	triples
Gold medal – first place	2023	fours
National Championships
Gold medal – first place	2021	singles

Niksa Benguric is a South African international lawn and indoor bowler. He reached a career high ranking of world number 28 in October 2024.

== Bowls career ==
Benguric came to prominence after becoming the champion of South Africa in 2021. He won the men's singles title at the National Championships, bowling for Wingate Park BC, defeating Bradley Robinson in the final. This qualified him to play in the World Singles Champion of Champions in 2022.

Benguric was selected by the South African national team to represent them at the African States Tournament in June 2023, where he made his international debut. He won the gold medal in the triples and the fours. Also in 2023, Benguric representing Gauteng North, won the South African Masters title.

In August 2023, Benguric was selected by the national team again, to represent them at the sport's blue riband event, the 2023 World Bowls Championship. He participated in the men's pairs and the men's fours events.

Benguric was selected for the national team at the 2024 African States Tournament in Botswana.
