= Bowls South Africa =

Governing body for the sport of bowls in South Africa

- Sport: Bowls
- Jurisdiction: South Africa
- Abbreviation: Bowls SA, BSA
- Founded: 1904
- Affiliation: World Bowls
- Headquarters: Johannesburg
- Location: Block 2, Unit 5, Visiomed Office Park, 269 Beyers Naude Drive, Blackheath, Johannesburg 2195
- President: David Hamer
- CEO: Bobby Donnelly
- Sponsor: Personal Trust Barton Insurance Brokers

Official website
- www.bowlssa.co.za
- (South Africa)

Bowls South Africa (Bowls SA), (BSA) is the governing body for the sport of bowls in South Africa. Bowls South Africa is responsible for the promotion and development of lawn bowls in South Africa, and is affiliated with the world governing body World Bowls, as well as SASCOC.

Bowls SA organise tournaments such as men's and women's South African National Bowls Championships, with competition in the main bowls disciplines of fours, pairs and singles, as well as Mixed Pairs Championships. Affiliate member associations (or Districts), alongside associate members and bowling clubs assist with the nurturing and training of potential bowls players.

== History ==
Bowls as a sport began in South Africa around 1882, when the initial bowling green was commissioned at St Georges Park in Port Elizabeth. These were followed by Kimberley in 1889, Gardens (Capetown) in 1895 and Victoria Park in 1898. Together the four clubs formed the South African Bowling Association, which was founded in 1904 as the governing body for the sport of bowls in South Africa.

The National Championships began in 1897.

The growth of the women's game led to the establishment of South African Women's Bowling Association in 1935 to control and promote the women's game. The two controlling bodies merged in 1996 to establish Bowls South Africa.

== See also ==
- South African National Bowls Championships
- Sport in South Africa
- 1976 World Outdoor Bowls Championship
- Lawn bowls at the Commonwealth Games
