= Stephen Bezanson =

Canadian lawn bowler

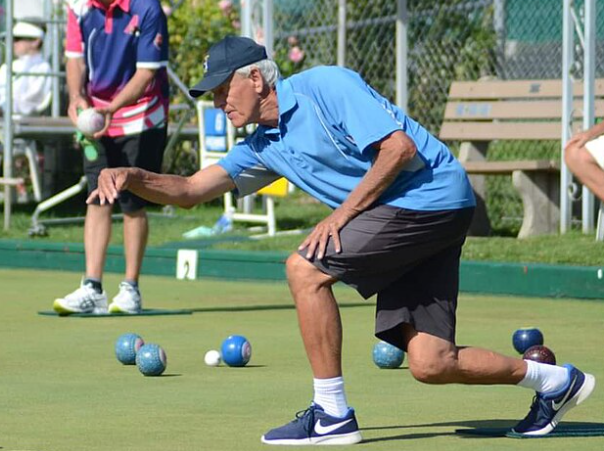
- Steve Bezanson, Canadian lawn bowler in 2024

Personal information
- Nationality: Canadian

Sport
- Club: Wanderers LBC
Medal record
Representing (Canada)
Asia Pacific Bowls Championships
Silver medal – second place	2001 Melbourne	fours

Stephen Manson Bezanson is a former Canadian international lawn bowler.

== Bowls career ==
Bezanson has represented Canada at the Commonwealth Games, in the fours at the 2002 Commonwealth Games.

He won a fours silver medal at the 2001 Asia Pacific Bowls Championships in Melbourne.

He has won eight Canadian National titles.
