= Nor Azwa Mohamed Di =

Malaysian lawn bowls international

Personal information
- Nationality: Malaysian
Medal record
Representing Malaysia
Commonwealth Games
Bronze medal – third place	1998 Kuala Lumpur	fours
Southeast Asian Games
Gold medal – first place	1999 Bandar Seri Begawan	fours

Nor Azwa Mohamed Di is a Malaysian lawn bowls international.

Nor won a bronze medal in the Women's fours at the Commonwealth Games in Kuala Lumpur with Siti Zalina Ahmad, Haslah Hassan and Nor Hashimah Ismail.

In 1999, she won the gold medal in the fours event at the 1999 Southeast Asian Games in Bandar Seri Begawan.
