= Anne Ainsworth =

Namibian lawn bowls competitor (born 1951)

Personal information
- Nationality: Namibian
- Born: 13 March 1951 (age 75)
Medal record
Representing Namibia
Atlantic Bowls Championships
Bronze medal – third place	1993 Florida	pairs

Anne Ainsworth (born 1951) is a former international lawn bowls competitor for Namibia.

== Bowls career ==
In 1993, she won the pairs bronze medal with Cathelean du Plessis, at the inaugural Atlantic Bowls Championships in Florida.

She has represented Namibia at the Commonwealth Games, in the fours event, at the 1994 Commonwealth Games.
