= Haslah Hasan =

Malaysian national and international coach

Haslah Haji Hasan
Personal information
- Nationality: Malaysian
- Born: 5 April 1965 (age 61)

Sport
- Club: Selangor
Medal record
Representing Malaysia
Commonwealth Games
Bronze medal – third place	1998 Kuala Lumpur	fours
Asia Pacific Bowls Championships
Bronze medal – third place	1995 Dunedin	triples
Bronze medal – third place	2001 Melbourne	triples
Bronze medal – third place	2001 Melbourne	fours
Gold medal – first place	2003 Brisbane	triples
Silver medal – second place	2003 Brisbane	fours
Southeast Asian Games
Gold medal – first place	1999 Bandar Seri Begawan	fours
Gold medal – first place	2001 Kuala Lumpur	fours
Gold medal – first place	2005 Angeles City	pairs
Asian Lawn Bowls Championship
Gold medal – first place	2003 Kuala Lumpur	triples
Gold medal – first place	2003 Kuala Lumpur	fours
Gold medal – first place	2005 Kuala Lumpur	fours

Haslah Haji Hasan is a Malaysian lawn bowls international and national coach.

== Biography ==
Haslah Hasan won a bronze medal in the Women's fours at the Commonwealth Games in Kuala Lumpur with Siti Zalina Ahmad, Nor Azwa Mohamed Di and Nor Hashimah Ismail.

She has won five medals at the Asia Pacific Bowls Championships including a gold medal in the 2003 triples, in Brisbane, Australia and also won a three gold medals in the Lawn bowls at the Southeast Asian Games (twice in the fours and once in the pairs).

She has coached the elite women's Malaysian national team from 2009.
