= George Boxwell =

Canadian international lawn bowler

Personal information
- Nationality: Canada
Medal record
Representing Canada
Commonwealth Games
Silver medal – second place	1990 Auckland	pairs

George Boxwell is a former Canadian international lawn bowler.

He won a silver medal for Canada when he was part of the pairs team at the 1990 Commonwealth Games in Auckland, New Zealand. His pairs partner was Alf Wallace.

He is a four times national champion spanning from 1977 to 1988.
