= Alf Wallace =

Canadian international lawn bowler

Personal information
- Nationality: Canadian
Medal record
Representing Canada
Commonwealth Games
Silver medal – second place	1990 Auckland	pairs
Asia Pacific Bowls Championships
Bronze medal – third place	1985 Tweed Heads	triples

Alf Wallace is a former Canadian international lawn bowler.

He competed in the singles at the 1986 Commonwealth Games in Edinburgh, Scotland. Four years later he won a silver medal for Canada when he was part of the pairs team at the 1990 Commonwealth Games in Auckland, New Zealand. His pairs partner was George Boxwell.

He won the triples bronze medal at the inaugural 1985 Asia Pacific Bowls Championships.

He is an eight times national champion spanning from 1981 to 2001.
