= Harriette Pituley =

Personal information
- Nationality: Canadian
- Born: 19 June 1958 (age 68)

Sport
- Sport: Lawn bowls
Medal record
Representing Canada
Atlantic Bowls Championships
Bronze medal – third place	2007 Ayr	triples
Bronze medal – third place	2007 Ayr	fours
Asia Pacific Bowls Championships
Bronze medal – third place	2011 Adelaide	fours

Harriette Pituley (born 1958) is a Canadian International lawn bowler.

== Biography ==
In 2007, Pituley won the triples and fours bronze medals at the Atlantic Bowls Championships.

Four years later she won another bronze medal but this time in the fours at the 2011 Asia Pacific Bowls Championships in Adelaide. She has won six Canadian National titles.

She was selected to represent Canada at the 2010 Commonwealth Games, where she competed in the triples event.
