= Margaret Richards (bowls) =

Personal information
- Nationality: Canadian
Medal record
Representing (Canada)
Asia Pacific Bowls Championships
| Gold medal – first place | 1993 Victoria | fours |

Margaret Richards is a former Canadian international lawn bowler.

== Bowls career ==
Richards has represented Canada at the Commonwealth Games, in the fours at the 1994 Commonwealth Games.

She won the fours gold medal at the 1993 Asia Pacific Bowls Championships, in Victoria, Canada, with Anita Nivala, Jean Roney and Margaret Fettes. She has won three Canadian National titles.
