= Lesley Hartwell =

Personal information
- Nationality: South African
- Born: 1949 (age 76–77) Port Elizabeth
Medal record
Representing South Africa
Commonwealth Games
Gold medal – first place	1998 Kuala Lumpur	Women's singles
Atlantic Bowls Championships
Silver medal – second place	1999 Cape Town	Women's pairs

Lesley Hartwell (born 1949) is a former South African international lawn bowler.

== Career ==
In 1998 Hartwell won the Women's singles gold medal in lawn bowling at the 1998 Commonwealth Games in Kuala Lumpur. She defeated local hero Saedah Abdul Rahim of Malaysia 25-14 in the final after recovering from a 3-11 deficit.

The following year in 1999, she won the singles silver medal at the Atlantic Bowls Championships in her home country.

She still represents the Eastern Province.
