= Noel Graham (bowls) =

Northern Irish international lawn and indoor bowler

Personal information
- Nationality: British (Northern Irish)
- Born: 2 November 1968 (age 57)

Sport
- Sport: Lawn and indoor bowls
- Club: Lisnagarvey BC
Medal record
Representing Ireland
World Outdoor Championships
Gold medal – first place	2004 Ayr	fours
Silver medal – second place	2004 Ayr	pairs
Bronze medal – third place	2004 Ayr	team
British Isles Championships
Gold medal – first place	1996	singles
Gold medal – first place	1999	triples
Representing Northern Ireland
Commonwealth Games
Bronze medal – third place	1994 Victoria	fours
Bronze medal – third place	2002 Manchester	fours

Noel Henry Graham (born 2 November 1968) is a former international lawn and indoor bowler from Northern Ireland.

== Biography ==
Graham (born 1968) won a bronze medal in the fours at 1994 Commonwealth Games in Victoria and repeated the feat eight years later at the 2002 Commonwealth Games in Manchester.

In the World Championships he won gold medal in the fours with Jonathan Ross, Neil Booth and Jim Baker and a silver medal with Jim Baker in the pairs during the 2004 World Outdoor Bowls Championship.

In 1995, he won the Hong Kong International Bowls Classic singles title, in addition to winning three pairs titles in 1999, 2000 and 2005. He won the 1995 Irish National Bowls Championships singles and subsequently won the singles at the British Isles Bowls Championships in 1996.

Graham retired from international competition in 2014.
