= Mohamed Tazman Tahir =

Malaysian lawn bowler

Personal information
- Nationality: Malaysian
Medal record
Representing Malaysia
Commonwealth Games
Bronze medal – third place	1998 Kuala Lumpur	pairs
Asia Pacific Bowls Championships
Bronze medal – third place	2001 Melbourne	fours
Southeast Asian Games
Gold medal – first place	1999 Bandar Seri Begawan	pairs
Gold medal – first place	2001 Kuala Lumpur	pairs

Mohamed Tazman Tahir is a former Malaysian international lawn bowler.

== Bowls career ==
Tahir won the bronze medal in the pairs with Mohamed Aziz Maswadi at the 1998 Commonwealth Games in Kuala Lumpur. In 1999, he won the gold medal in the pairs event at the 1999 Southeast Asian Games in Bandar Seri Begawan.

He won the fours bronze medal at the 2001 Asia Pacific Bowls Championships, in Melbourne. He won a second gold medal at the 2001 South East Asian Games.
