= Wayne Rittmuller =

South African lawn bowler

Personal information
- Nationality: South African
- Born: 18 June 1982 (age 44) South Africa

Sport
- Sport: Lawn bowls
- Club: Stella Park BC
Medal record
Representing South Africa
Men's lawn bowls
National Championships
Gold medal – first place	2017	singles
Gold medal – first place	2018	singles
Gold medal – first place	2022	pairs

Wayne Neville Rittmuller (born 18 June 1982) is a South African international lawn bowler and three times national champion of South Africa. He has represented South Africa at the Commonwealth Games.

== Biography ==
Rittmuller started playing bowls aged 12 and played for Wentworth Bowling Club from 2001 to 2005. He won the South African national singles title two years in succession in 2017 and 2018 at the South African National Bowls Championships, when bowling for Stella Park (Port Natal). In 2022, he won his third title but this time in the pairs with Jason Lott for the Hillary BC.

In 2022, he was selected for the 2022 Commonwealth Games in Birmingham where he competed in the men's pairs event and the men's fours event.

In 2023, he was selected as part of the team to represent South Africa at the 2023 World Outdoor Bowls Championship. He participated in the men's singles and the men's pairs events.
