= Steve McKerihen =

Canadian lawn bowler

Personal information
- Nationality: Canadian
- Born: 7 January 1957 (age 69) Toronto, Canada

Sport
- Sport: Lawn bowls
- Club: Etobicoke BC
Medal record
Representing Canada
Asia Pacific Bowls Championships
Silver medal – second place	2007 Christchurch	triples
Bronze medal – third place	2007 Christchurch	fours

Steven John McKerihen (born 1957) is a Canadian international lawn bowler.

== Bowls career ==
He started bowling at the age of eight in 1965, at the Toronto-Boulevard Club. In 2007, he won the silver in the triples and bronze in the fours at the Asia Pacific Bowls Championships in Christchurch, New Zealand.

He has been selected twice for the triples team by Canada for the Commonwealth Games; at the 2006 Commonwealth Games in Melbourne and the 2010 Commonwealth Games in Delhi.

McKerihen is the most successful fours skip in Canadian lawn bowls history, with six gold medals as skip in the fours at the Canadian Championships.

== Personal life ==
He is a teacher by trade. His daughter is Kelly McKerihen.
