= Kevin Jones (bowls) =

Canadian lawn bowler

Personal information
- Nationality: Canadian
- Born: 10 January 1964 (age 62) London, Ontario, Canada

Sport
- Sport: Lawn bowls
Medal record
Representing Canada
Asia Pacific Bowls Championships
Bronze medal – third place	1987 Lae, PNG	triples
Bronze medal – third place	1997 Warilla	fours

Kevin Jones (born January 10, 1964) is a Canadian international lawn bowler.

== Bowls career ==
Jones won two bronze medals in the triples and fours respectively at the Asia Pacific Bowls Championships in 1987 and 1997.

He was selected to represent Canada at three Commonwealth Games; the 1994 Commonwealth Games, 1998 Commonwealth Games and the 2014 Commonwealth Games.

== Family ==
His father is Ronnie Jones.
