= Rudi Jacobs =

South African lawn bowler

Josephus 'Rudi' Jacobs
Personal information
- Nationality: South African
- Born: 16 June 1960 (age 64); Heilbron, South Africa

Sport
- Sport: Lawn bowls
- Club: Parys Bowling Club

Josephus 'Rudi' Jacobs (born 1960) is a South African lawn bowler.

== Bowls career ==
Jacobs was selected for the Lawn bowls squad at the 2014 Commonwealth Games but was replaced by Petrus Breitenbach. In 2018 Jacobs was selected as part of the South Africa team for the 2018 Commonwealth Games on the Gold Coast in Queensland.

Jacobs won the 2015 singles at the National Championships bowling for the Parys Bowls Club.
