= Roy Garden =

Zimbabwean bowls player (1961–2023)

Personal information
- Nationality: Zimbabwean
- Born: 20 March 1961 Bulawayo, Southern Rhodesia
- Died: 20 January 2023 (aged 61) Harare, Zimbabwe
Medal record
lawn bowls
Commonwealth Games
Gold medal – first place	1998 Kuala Lumpur	singles

Roy George Garden (20 March 1961 – 20 January 2023) was an international lawn and indoor bowler from Zimbabwe.

Garden was born in Bulawayo in 1961 and was educated in Bulawayo, Harare and Mutare. He joined the police force in 1980, briefly serving in the British South Africa Police before it became the Zimbabwe Republic Police. He left the police in 1983. In 1998, he competed in the Commonwealth Games where he won the gold medal in the singles at the 1998 Commonwealth Games in Kuala Lumpur, Malaysia.

He retired from international competition in January 2014. He died on 20 January 2023 at the age of 62.
