= Saedah Abdul Rahim =

Malaysian international lawn bowler

Personal information
- Nationality: Malaysian
- Born: 1968 (age 57–58) Klang
Medal record
Representing Malaysia
Commonwealth Games
Silver medal – second place	1998 Kuala Lumpur	Women's singles
Asia Pacific Bowls Championships
Bronze medal – third place	1995 Dunedin	pairs
Bronze medal – third place	1997 Warilla	fours

Saedah Abdul Rahim is a former Malaysian international lawn bowler.

== Bowls career ==
In 1998 Saedah won the Women's singles silver medal at the 1998 Commonwealth Games in Kuala Lumpur. She lost in the final to Lesley Hartwell of South Africa despite leading the match 11–3.

Saedah, was a bronze medallist at the 1995 and 1997 Asia Pacific Bowls Championships in Dunedin and Warilla respectively.
