= Bruce Makkink =

South African international lawn bowler

Personal information
- Nationality: South Africa

Sport
- Sport: Lawn bowls
- Club: Port Natal; RDLI
Medal record
Representing South Africa
World Outdoor Championships
Silver medal – second place	2000 Johannesburg	fours
Commonwealth Games
Bronze medal – third place	1998 Kuala Lumpur	fours

Bruce Makkink is a South African international lawn bowler.

== Bowls career ==
He won a silver medal in the fours at the 2000 World Outdoor Bowls Championship in Johannesburg.

He also won a bronze medal in the fours at the 1998 Commonwealth Games in Kuala Lumpur.

He won three titles at the National Championships bowling for the R.D.L.I Sport Club. They were the 2010 & 2011 singles and 2011 fours.
