= Rob Law =

Canadian lawn bowler (born 1997)

Personal information
- Born: 16 October 1997 (age 28) Winnipeg, Manitoba, Canada

Sport
- Sport: Bowls
- Club: Norwood LBC

Achievements and titles
- Highest world ranking: 36 (August 2026)
Medal record
Representing Canada
Asia Pacific Bowls Championships
| Bronze medal – third place | 2019 Gold Coast | pairs |
| Bronze medal – third place | 2019 Gold Coast | fours |

Robert Law (born 16 October 1997) is a Canadian international lawn and indoor bowler. He reached a career high ranking of world number 36 in August 2026.

== Bowls career ==
=== World Championships ===
In 2020, he was selected for the 2020 World Outdoor Bowls Championship in Australia but the event was cancelled due to the COVID-19 pandemic.

In 2023, he was selected again by Canada for the 2023 World Outdoor Bowls Championship. He participated in the men's triples and the men's fours events. In the triples, Law finished third in his group.

=== Commonwealth Games ===
In 2022, he competed in the men's triples and the men's fours at the 2022 Commonwealth Games.

=== Asia Pacific ===
Law won two bronze medals at the 2019 Asia Pacific Bowls Championships, in the pairs with Ryan Bester and the fours, held in the Gold Coast, Queensland.
