= Gerald Baker (bowls) =

South African lawn bowler

Gerry Baker
Personal information
- Nationality: South African
- Born: 7 October 1960 (age 65) Bloemfontein, South Africa

Sport
- Club: Morningside Bowls Club
Medal record
Men's lawn bowls
Representing South Africa
Commonwealth Games
Bronze medal – third place	1998 Kuala Lumpur	Men's singles
Bronze medal – third place	2002 Manchester	Men's pairs
Gold medal – first place	2010 Delhi	Men's pairs
World Outdoor Bowls Championships
Silver medal – second place	2000 Johannesburg	Men's pairs
Bronze medal – third place	2012 Adelaide	Men's singles
Bronze medal – third place	2012 Adelaide	Men's team
Atlantic Bowls Championships
Gold medal – first place	2007 Ayr	fours
Gold medal – first place	2009 Johannesburg	singles
Gold medal – first place	2011 Paphos	pairs

Gerald Salem Baker (born 7 October 1960), known as Gerry Baker, is a lawn bowler.

== Bowls career ==
Baker is from Bloemfontein, in South Africa and has won three medals at the World Outdoor Championships and three medals at the Commonwealth Games. He broke a South African record by appearing at six Commonwealth Games.

In 1996, he won the Hong Kong International Bowls Classic pairs title with Neil Burkett. In 1998 he won a bronze medal in the singles at the 1998 Kuala Lumpur Commonwealth Games and two years later he teamed up with Shaun Addinall to claim a Pairs silver medal in the 2000 World Outdoor Bowls Championship in Johannesburg. Another bronze arrived in 2002 with Addinall in the Pairs during the 2002 Manchester Commonwealth Games before he and Addinall finally won a Gold Medal in the Pairs at the 2010 Delhi Commonwealth Games.

In 2007 he won the fours gold medal at the Atlantic Bowls Championships. In 2009 he won the singles gold medal at the Atlantic Championships and two years later won the pairs gold medal at the 2011 Atlantic Championships.

His most recent success came in the 2012 World Outdoor Bowls Championship when he picked up a fifth medal of note by claiming bronze in the Singles in Adelaide.

He was selected as part of the South Africa team for the 2018 Commonwealth Games on the Gold Coast in Queensland (his sixth Games).

At national level he has finished runner-up three times at the South African National Bowls Championships bowling for the Belgravia Bowls Club. He finally won a national title, when winning the pairs with Bradley Robinson in May 2023.

== Business career ==
Baker was appointed as a Director of World Bowls on 1 June 2020.
