= Kevin Walsh (bowls) =

Australian lawn bowler

Personal information
- Nationality: Australian
- Born: 20 May 1969 (age 57)
Medal record
Representing Australia
World Outdoor Championships
Silver medal – second place	2004 Ayr	fours
Commonwealth Games
Silver medal – second place	1998 Commonwealth Games	fours
Asia Pacific Bowls Championships
Silver medal – second place	1997 Warilla	fours
Gold medal – first place	2003 Brisbane	fours
Silver medal – second place	2003 Brisbane	triples

Kevin Walsh (born 1969) is a former Australian international lawn bowler.

== Bowls career ==
Walsh made his Australian debut in 1996 and won the silver medal in the fours at the 1998 Commonwealth Games in Kuala Lumpur.

He won a silver medal in the fours at the 2004 World Outdoor Bowls Championship and announced his international retirement in 2005.

He won three medals at the Asia Pacific Bowls Championships, including a gold medal in the 2003 fours, in Brisbane.
