= Jean Roney =

Canadian bowls player (born 1945)

Personal information
- Nationality: Canadian
- Born: 11 September 1945 (age 80) Nokomis, Saskatchewan, Canada
Medal record
Representing (Canada)
Asia Pacific Bowls Championships
Gold medal – first place	1993 Victoria	fours
Bronze medal – third place	1995 Dunedin	fours

Jean Marie Roney (born 1945) is a former Canadian international lawn bowler.

== Bowls career ==
Roney has represented Canada at two Commonwealth Games at the 1994 Commonwealth Games and the 2006 Commonwealth Games.

She won two medals at the Asia Pacific Bowls Championships, including a gold medal in the 1993 fours in her home country. She has won 11 Canadian National titles.

== Personal life ==
She is a forensic scientist by trade and is married to fellow international bowler Keith Roney.
