= Keith Roney =

Canadian international lawn bowler (born 1948)

Personal information
- Nationality: Canadian
- Born: February 7, 1948 (age 78) Regina, Saskatchewan

Sport
- Sport: Lawn bowls
- Club: Regina Lawn Bowling Club
Medal record
Representing Canada
World Outdoor Championships
Gold medal – first place	2004 Ayr	pairs
Bronze medal – third place	2008 Christchurch	triples
Asia Pacific Bowls Championships
Bronze medal – third place	1993 Victoria	fours
Bronze medal – third place	1995 Dunedin	triples
Bronze medal – third place	1997 Warilla	triples
Gold medal – first place	2003 Brisbane	pairs

Keith Norman Roney (born February 11, 1948) is a Canadian international lawn bowler.

== Bowls career ==
He was born in Regina, Saskatchewan, he grew up in Bulyea, Saskatchewan and first began bowling in 1979. He has won 27 medals at the Canadian Championships and was inducted into the Saskatchewan Sports Hall of Fame.

He won four medals at the Asia Pacific Bowls Championships including a gold medal in the 2003 pairs, in Brisbane, Australia.

Roney won the gold medal in the pairs with Ryan Bester at the 2004 World Outdoor Bowls Championship in Ayr.

== Personal life ==
He is married to fellow international bowler Jean Roney.
