= Australia at the 1986 Commonwealth Games =

- CG code: AUS
- CGA: Australian Commonwealth Games Association
- Website: commonwealthgames.org.au

in Edinburgh, Scotland
- Competitors: 235 in 11 sports
- Flag bearers: Opening: Michael Turtur; Closing:Gael Martin
- Officials: 69
- Medals Ranked 3rd: Gold 40 Silver 46 Bronze 35 Total 121

Commonwealth Games appearances (overview)
- 1930; 1934; 1938; 1950; 1954; 1958; 1962; 1966; 1970; 1974; 1978; 1982; 1986; 1990; 1994; 1998; 2002; 2006; 2010; 2014; 2018; 2022; 2026; 2030

Australia participated at the 1986 Commonwealth Games in Edinburgh, Scotland in 24 July and 2 August 1986. . It was Australia's thirteenth appearance at the Commonwealth Games, having competed at every Games since their inception in 1930. Australia won medals in eleven of the eleven sports that it entered

== Medallists ==
The following Australian competitors won medals at the games.

Medal	Name	Sport	Event
Gold	Robert De Castella	Athletics	Men's marathon
Gold	Simon Baker	Athletics	Men's 30km walk
Gold	Gary Honey	Athletics	Men's long jump
Gold	Debbie Flintoff	Athletics	Women's 400 metres
Gold	Lisa Martin	Athletics	Women's marathon
Gold	Debbie Flintoff	Athletics	Women's 400 metres hurdles
Gold	Christine Stanton	Athletics	Women's high jump
Gold	Gael Martin	Athletics	Women's shot put
Gold	Gael Martin	Athletics	Women's discus throw
Gold	Michael Scandolera; Audrey Tuckey	Badminton	Mixed doubles
Gold	Martin Vinnicombe	Cycling	Men's time trial
Gold	Gary Neiwand	Cycling	Men's sprint
Gold	Dean Woods	Cycling	Men's individual pursuit
Gold	Glenn Clarke; Brett Dutton; Bill Hardy; Wayne McCarney; Dean Woods	Cycling	Men's team pursuit
Gold	Wayne McCarney; Dean Woods	Cycling	Men's 10 miles scratch
Gold	Shaun Panayi	Diving	Men's 3 metres springboard
Gold	Craig Rogerson	Diving	Men's 10 metres platform
Gold	James Galloway; Malcolm Batten; Andrew Cooper; Mike McKay; Mark Doyle; James Tomkins; Ion Popa; Steve Evans; Dale Caterson	Rowing	Men's eights
Gold	Peter Antonie	Rowing	Men's lightweight single sculls
Gold	Annelies Voorthuis; Deborah Bassett; Vicki Spooner; Margot Foster; Marilyn Kidd; Robyn Grey-Gardner; Susan Chapman; Ursula Kay; Kaylynn Fry	Rowing	Women's eights
Gold	Adair Ferguson	Rowing	Women's lightweight single sculls
Gold	Phil Adams; Rod Hack	Shooting	Open centre-fire pistol – Pairs
Gold	Pat Murray	Shooting	Open rapid-fire pistol
Gold	Alan Smith	Shooting	Open small bore rifle, prone
Gold	Stan Golinski	Shooting	Open full bore rifle
Gold	Greg Fasala	Swimming	Men's 100 metres freestyle
Gold	Robert Gleria	Swimming	Men's 200 metres freestyle
Gold	Duncan Armstrong	Swimming	Men's 400 metres freestyle
Gold	Jason Plummer	Swimming	Men's 1500 metres freestyle
Gold	Greg Fasala; Matthew Renshaw; Mark Stockwell; Neil Brooks	Swimming	Men's 4 x 100 metres freestyle
Gold	Duncan Armstrong; Peter Dale; Roberto Gleria; Thomas Stachewicz	Swimming	Men's 4 x 200 metres freestyle
Gold	Susie Baumer	Swimming	Women's 200 metres freestyle
Gold	Georgina Parkes	Swimming	Women's 200 metres backstrokee
Gold	Suzanne Landells	Swimming	Women's 200 metres individual medley
Gold	Suzanne Landells	Swimming	Women's 400 metres individual medley
Gold	Jenni Burke; Michelle Pearson; Sarah Thorpe; Susie Baumer	Swimming	Women's 4 x 200 metres freestyle
Gold	Greg Hayman	Weightlifting	Men's flyweight
Gold	Nick Voukelatos	Weightlifting	Men's bantamweight
Gold	Bill Stellios	Weightlifting	Men's middleweight
Gold	Dean Lukin	Weightlifting	Men's super heavyweight
Silver	Darren Clark	Athletics	Men's 400 metres
Silver	Bruce Frayne; Miles Murphy; David Johnston; Darren Clark	Athletics	Men's 4 x 400 metres
Silver	Joe Quigley	Athletics	Men's shot put
Silver	Paul Nandapi	Athletics	Men's discus throw
Silver	Jane Flemming	Athletics	Women's heptathlon
Silver	Sze Yu	Badminton	Mixed singles
Silver	Ian Schuback	Lawn bowls	Men's singles
Silver	Audrey Hefford; Betty Schenke; Clarice Power; Patricia Smith	Lawn bowls	Women's fours
Silver	David Clencie	Boxing	Light welterweight
Silver	Rick Finch	Boxing	Light middleweight
Silver	Jeff Harding	Boxing	Middleweight
Silver	Dean Woods	Cycling	Men's 10 miles scratch
Silver	Jenny Donnet	Diving	Women's 3 metres springboard
Silver	Valerie Beddoe	Diving	Women's 10 metres platform
Silver	Richard Powell	Rowing	Men's singles sculls
Silver	Paul Reedy; Brenton Terrell	Rowing	Men's double sculls
Silver	Simon Cook; Brian Digby; Merrick Howes; Joseph Joyce	Rowing	Men's Lightweight coxless four
Silver	Deborah Bassett; Susan Chapman-Popa; Robyn Grey-Gardner; Marilyn Kidd; Kaylynn Fry	Rowing	Women's coxed four
Silver	Deborah Clingeleffer; Amanda Cross; Virginia Lee; Karin Riedel	Rowing	Women's lightweight coxless four
Silver	Phil Adams; Rod Hack	Shooting	Open free pistol
Silver	Phil Adams; Rod Hack	Shooting	Open centre-fire pistol
Silver	Phil Adams; Bruce Favell	Shooting	Open air pistol - pairs
Silver	Pat Murray; Jack Mast	Shooting	Open rapid-fire pistol – pairs
Silver	Donald Brook; Alan Smith	Shooting	Open small bore rifle, prone – pairs
Silver	James Corbett; Stan Golinski	Shooting	Open full bore rifle – pairs
Silver	Wolfgang Jobst; Anton Wurfel	Shooting	Open air rifle – pairs
Silver	Neil Brooks	Swimming	Men's 100 metres freestyle
Silver	Peter Dale	Swimming	Men's 200 metres freestyle
Silver	Michael McKenzie	Swimming	Men's 1500 metres freestyle
Silver	Rob Woodhouse	Swimming	Men's 200 metres individual medley
Silver	Rob Woodhouse	Swimming	Men's 400 metres individual medley
Silver	Angela Harris	Swimming	Women's 100 metres freestyle
Silver	Susie Baumer	Swimming	Women's 400 metres freestyle
Silver	Julie McDonald	Swimming	Women's 800 metres freestyle
Silver	Georgina Parkes	Swimming	Women's 100 metres backstroke
Silver	Karen Phillips	Swimming	Women's 200 metres butterfly
Silver	Jodi Clatworthy	Swimming	Women's 400 metres individual medley
Silver	David Lowenstein	Weightlifting	Men's featherweight
Silver	Ron Laycock	Weightlifting	Men's lightweight
Silver	Robert Kabbas	Weightlifting	Men's light heavyweight
Silver	Gino Frantangelo	Weightlifting	Men's heavyweight
Silver	James McAlary	Wrestling	Men's flyweight
Silver	Dan Cumming	Wrestling	Men's featherweight
Silver	Geoffrey Marsh	Wrestling	Men's welterweight
Silver	Zsigmund Kelevitz	Wrestling	Men's lightweight
Silver	Wally Koenig	Wrestling	Men's middleweight
Bronze	Steve Moneghetti	Athletics	Men's marathon
Bronze	Don Wright	Athletics	Men's 110 metres hurdles
Bronze	Neil Honey	Athletics	Men's 110 pole vault
Bronze	Peter Beames	Athletics	Men's triple jump
Bronze	Stuart Gyngell	Athletics	Men's shot put
Bronze	Werner Reiterer	Athletics	Men's discus throw
Bronze	Phil Spivey	Athletics	Men's hammer throw
Bronze	Glynis Nunn	Athletics	Women's 110 metres hurdles
Bronze	Jenny Laurendet	Athletics	Women's 400 metres hurdles
Bronze	Maree Chapman; Sharon Stewart; Julie Schwass; Debbie Flintoff	Athletics	Women's 4 x 400 metres
Bronze	Robyn Strong	Athletics	Women's long jump
Bronze	Sue Howland	Athletics	Women's javelin throw
Bronze	Rhonda Cator; Karen Jupp; Paul Kong; Gordon Lang; Darren McDonald; Julie McDonald; Mike Scandolera; Tracey Small; Audrey Tuckey; Sze Yu	Badminton	Mixed team
Bronze	Max Rainsford	Cycling	Men's time trial
Bronze	Jeff Leslie	Cycling	Men's road race
Bronze	Craig Rogerson	Diving	Men's 3 metres springboard
Bronze	Julie Kent	Diving	Women's 10 metres platform
Bronze	Mark Doyle; James Galloway; Mike McKay; James Tomkins; Dale Caterson	Rowing	Men's coxed four
Bronze	Catherine Hall; Alison Smith	Rowing	Women's coxless pair
Bronze	Phil Adams; Bengt Sandström	Shooting	Open free pistol – pairs
Bronze	Rod Hack	Shooting	Open centre-fire pistol
Bronze	Terry Rumbel; Domingo Diaz	Shooting	Open trap - pairs
Bronze	Thomas Stachewicz	Swimming	Men's 200 metres freestyle
Bronze	Brett Stocks	Swimming	Men's 100 metres breaststroke
Bronze	Carl Wilson; Brett Stocks; Barry Armstrong; Greg Fasala	Swimming	Men's 4 x 100 metres medley
Bronze	Jenni Burke	Swimming	Women's 400 metres freestyle
Bronze	Jenni Burke	Swimming	Women's 800 metres freestyle
Bronze	Nicole Livingstone	Swimming	Women's 100 metres backstroke
Bronze	Jodi McGibbon	Swimming	Women's 200 metres backstroke
Bronze	Dimity Douglas	Swimming	Women's 100 metres breaststroke
Bronze	Dimity Douglas	Swimming	Women's 200 metres breaststroke
Bronze	Angela Harris; Jacqueline Grant; Julie Pugh; Sarah Thorpe	Swimming	Women's 4 x 100 metres freestyle
Bronze	Angela Harris; Dimity Douglas; Georgina Parkes; Karen Phillips	Swimming	Women's 4 x 100 metres medley
Bronze	Lisa Lieschke; Donna Rankin	Synchronised Swimming	Women's duet
Bronze	Charles Garzarella	Weightlifting	Men's super heavyweight

Medals by sport
Sport	1st place, gold medalist(s)	2nd place, silver medalist(s)	3rd place, bronze medalist(s)	
Aquatics	13	13	14	33
Athletics	9	5	12	26
Cycling	5	1	2	8
Shooting	4	7	3	14
Rowing	4	5	2	11
Weightlifting	4	4	1	9
Badminton	1	1	1	3
Wrestling	0	5	0	5
Boxing	0	3	0	3
Lawn bowls	0	2	0	2
Total	40	46	35	121

Medals by gender
Gender	Gold medal	Silver medal	Bronze medal	Total
Male	22	26	15	63
Female	13	12	16	41
Mixed / open	5	8	4	17
Total	40	46	35	121

== Aquatics ==
The aquatics events were held at the Royal Commonwealth Pool.

=== Diving ===
Men

Athlete	Event	Final	
Athlete	Event	Points	Rank
Shaun Panayi	Springboard	648.33	(gold)
Craig Rogerson	Springboard	620.43	(bronze)
Steve Foley	Springboard	619.47	4
Craig Rogerson	Highboard	600.87	(gold)
Steve Foley	Highboard	527.31	7
Nathan Meade	Highboard	509.97	8

Women

Athlete	Event	Final	
Athlete	Event	Points	Rank
Jennifer Donnet	Springboard	494.52	(silver)
Valerie Beddoe	Springboard	481.59	4
Julie Kent	Springboard	451.47	6
Valerie Beddoe	Highboard	414.78	(silver)
Julie Kent	Highboard	411.18	(bronze)
Carol Boots	Highboard	346.41	8

=== Swimming ===
Men

Athlete	Event	Heat		Final	
Athlete	Event	Time	Rank	Time	Rank
Mark Stockwell	100 metre freestyle	51.48	1 Q	51.61	7
Neil Brooks	100 metre freestyle	51.82	2 Q	51.18	(silver)
Gregory Fasala	100 metre freestyle	51.39	1 Q	50.95	(gold)
Robert Gleria	200 metre freestyle	1:53.20	1 Q	1:50.57	(gold)
Thomas Stachewicz	200 metre freestyle	1:52.51	1 Q	1:51.21	(bronze)
Peter Dale	200 metre freestyle	1:51.39	1 Q	1:51.16	(silver)
Duncan Armstrong	400 metre freestyle	3:54.91	1 Q	3:52.25	(gold)
Michael McKenzie	400 metre freestyle	4:02.10	3	did not advance	
Jason Plummer	1500 metre freestyle	15:53.02	1 Q	15:12.62	(gold)
Michael McKenzie	1500 metre freestyle	15:49.21	3 Q	15:12.72	(silver)
Thomas Stachewicz	100 metre backstroke	58.81	3 Q	58.64	7
David Orbell	100 metre backstroke	58.93	3	did not advance	
Carl Wilson	100 metre backstroke	58.26	2 Q	58.28	5
David Orbell	200 metre backstroke	2:06.49	3 Q	2:05.59	6
Carl Wilson	200 metre backstroke	2:07.43	4	did not advance	
Robert Woodhouse	200 metre backstroke	2:06.86	4	did not advance	
Brett Stocks	100 metre breaststroke	1:04.30	1 Q	1:03.75	(bronze)
Lance Leech	100 metre breaststroke	1:05.95	2	did not advance	
Rodney Lawson	100 metre breaststroke	1:04.51	2 Q	1:04.72	4
Lance Leech	200 metre breaststroke	2:23.92	2	did not advance	
Rodney Lawson	200 metre breaststroke	2:21.95	2 Q	2:20.87	5
Brett Stocks	200 metre breaststroke	2:22.29	3 Q	2:23.29	8
Barry Armstrong	100 metre butterfly	54.75	1 Q	54.84	4
Peter Gee	100 metre butterfly	56.89	2	did not advance	
Anthony McDonald	100 metre butterfly	55.24	2 Q	55.31	5
Peter Gee	200 metre butterfly	2:02.04	2 Q	2:00.93	4
Anthony McDonald	200 metre butterfly	2:03.23	3 Q	2:01.46	6
Paul Lee	200 metre butterfly	2:06.30	5	did not advance	
Darren Stewart	200 metre individual medley	2:10.16	4	did not advance	
Robert Woodhouse	200 metre individual medley	2:06.56	3 Q	2:04.19	(silver)
Anthony McDonald	200 metre individual medley	2:08.00	3 Q	2:08.44	8
Robert Woodhouse	400 metre Individual Medley	4:31.25	2 Q	4:22.51	(silver)
Paul Lee	400 metre Individual Medley	4:37.69	4	did not advance	
Gregory Fasala; Matthew Renshaw; Mark Stockwell; Neil Brooks	4x100 metre freestyle relay	—N/a		3:21.58	(gold)
Thomas Stachewicz; Duncan Armstrong; Robert Gleria; Peter Dale	4x200 metre freestyle relay	—N/a		7:23.49	(gold)
Carl Wilson; Brett Stocks; Barry Armstrong; Gregory Fasala	4x100 metre medlay relay	3:53.67	1 Q	3:45.86	(bronze)

Women

Athlete	Event	Heat		Final	
Athlete	Event	Time	Rank	Time	Rank
Sarah Thorpe	100 metre freestyle	58.55	1 Q	58.17	5
Angela Harris	100 metre freestyle	57.85	1 Q	57.64	(silver)
Julie Pugh	100 metre freestyle	58.46	2 Q	58.10	4
Susie Baumer	200 metre freestyle	—N/a		2:00.61	(gold)
Michelle Pearson	200 metre freestyle	—N/a		2:04.85	6
Suzie Baumer	400 metre freestyle	4:16.80	1 Q	4:12.77	(silver)
Jenni Burke	400 metre freestyle	4:19.07	2 Q	4:14.22	(bronze)
Anna McVann	400 metre freestyle	4:22.06	4 Q	4:22.17	8
Jenni Burke	800 metre freestyle	8:45.76	2 Q	8:41.64	(bronze)
Julie McDonald	800 metre freestyle	8:47.04	2 Q	8:29.52	(silver)
Anna McVann	800 metre freestyle	8:53.06	3 Q	8:53.03	6
Audrey Moore	100 metre backstroke	1:05.09	2 Q	1:05.17	6
Georgina Parkes	100 metre backstroke	1:04.74	1 Q	1:04.07	(silver)
Nicole Livingstone	100 metre backstroke	1:04.56	1 Q	1:04.42	(bronze)
Georgina Parkes	200 metre backstroke	2:16.13	1 Q	2:14.88	(gold)
Jody McGibbon	200 metre backstroke	2:19.31	2 Q	2:17.66	(bronze)
Audrey Moore	200 metre backstroke	2:20.54	2 Q	2:19.20	4
Cindy-Lu Fitzpatrick	100 metre breaststroke	1:14.11	3 Q	1:14.38	8
Dimity Douglas	100 metre breaststroke	1:12.27	1 Q	1:11.98	(bronze)
Collette Gunn	100 metre breaststroke	1:15.24	5	did not advance	
Cindy-Lu Fitzpatrick	200 metre breaststroke	2:37.88	1 Q	2:36.58	6
Colette Gunn	200 metre breaststroke	2:41.57	3	did not advance	
Dimity Douglas	200 metre breaststroke	2:36.92	2 Q	2:34.54	(bronze)
Karen Phillips	100 metre butterfly	1:03.74	2 Q	1:03.24	4
Angela Harris	100 metre butterfly	1:03.03	1 Q	1:03.42	5
Celina Hardy	100 metre butterfly	1:03.70	2 Q	1:03.45	6
Celina Hardy	200 metre butterfly	2:16.21	1 Q	2:14.63	5
Karen Phillips	200 metre butterfly	2:13.11	1 Q	2:12.71	(silver)
Collette Gunn	200 metre butterfly	2:21.50	4	did not advance	
Jodie Clatworthy	200 metre individual medley	2:21.78	2 Q	2:21.07	5
Suzanne Landells	200 metre individual medley	2:19.61	2 Q	2:17.02	(gold)
Michelle Pearson	200 metre individual medley	2:21.55	3 Q	2:21.35	6
Jodie Clatworthy	400 metre individual medley	4:55.03	2 Q	4:49.67	(silver)
Suzanne Landells	400 metre individual medley	4:50.32	2 Q	4:45.82	(gold)
Michelle Pearson	400 metre individual medley	4:56.11	3 Q	4:55.10	6
Jacki Grant; Sarah Thorpe; Julie Pugh; Angela Harris	4x100 metre freestyle relay	—N/a		3:50.06	(bronze)
Jenni Burke; Sarah Thorpe; Susie Baumer; Michelle Pearson	4x200 metre freestyle relay	—N/a		8:12.09	(gold)
Georgina Parkes; Dimity Douglas; Karen Phillips; Angela Harris	4×100 metre medley relay	—N/a		4:15.06	(bronze)

=== Synchronised swimming ===
Athlete	Event	Final	
Athlete	Event	Points	Rank
Lisa Lieschke	Synchronised solo	171.30	4
Donna Rankin; Lisa Lieschke	Synchronised duet	173.00	(bronze)

== Athletics ==
Men
Track and road

Athlete	Event	Heat		Semifinal		Final	
Athlete	Event	Time	Rank	Time	Rank	Time	Rank
Chris Perry	100 metres	11	5 q	11.03	7	did not advance	
Robert Stone	100 metres	10.51	5 q	Disq.		did not advance	
Gerrard Keating	100 metres	10.56	3 Q	10.60	4 q	10.55	7
John Dinan	200 metres	20.99	1 Q	21.14	1 Q	21.07	7
Miles Murphy	200 metres	21.41	4 Q	21.44	5	did not advance	
Robert Stone	200 metres	21.01	3 Q	21.03	4 Q	20.94	4
Bruce Frayne	400 metres	46.99	2 Q	47.09	1 Q	47.29	7
Darren Clark	400 metres	46.12	1 Q	47.61	2 Q	45.98	(silver)
David Johnston	400 metres	47.13	3 Q	47.22	2 Q	47.24	6
Pat Scammell	800 metres	1:49.68	1 Q	1:49.24	3 Q	1:45.86	4
Peter Bourke	800 metres	1:51.23	1 Q	1:48.40	5 q	did not advance	
Peter Bourke	1500 metres	—N/a		3:44.77	3 Q	3:54.48	5
Mike Hillardt	1500 metres	—N/a		3:42.76	2 Q	3:56.90	8
Pat Scammell	1500 metres	—N/a		3:42.92	4 Q	3:55.28	6
Steve Moneghetti	10,000 metres	—N/a				28:29.20	5
Don Wright	110 metres hurdle	—N/a		13.77	2 Q	13.64	(bronze)
Ken Gordon	400 metres hurdles	—N/a		52.66	2 Q	51.59	8
Robert Stone; John Dinan; Gary Honey; Gerrard Keating	4 × 100 metres relay	—N/a				Disq.	
Bruce Frayne; Miles Murphy; David Johnston; Darren Clark	4 × 400 metres relay	—N/a				3:07.81	(silver)
Robert de Castella	Marathon	—N/a				2:10.15	(gold)
Steve Moneghetti	Marathon	—N/a				2:11.18	(bronze)
Simon Baker	30 kilometres walk	—N/a				2:07.47	(gold)
Willi Sawall	30 kilometres walk	—N/a				2:14.29	5

Field

Athlete	Event	Final	
Athlete	Event	Result	Rank
Neil Honey	Pole vault	5.20	(bronze)
Simon Arkell	Pole vault	4.75	7
Gary Honey	Long jump	8.08	(gold)
David Culbert	Long jump	7.41	7
Peter Beames	Triple jump	16.42	(bronze)
Gary Honey	Triple jump	16.16	4
Joe Quigley	Shot put	17.97	(silver)
Stuart Gyngell	Shot put	17.70	(bronze)
John Minns	Shot put	16.99	6
Paul Nandapi	Discus throw	57.74	(silver)
Werner Reiterer	Discus throw	57.34	(bronze)
Vlad Slavnic	Discus throw	54.48	7
Phil Spivey	Hammer throw	70.30	(bronze)
Joe Quigley	Hammer throw	69.30	5
Hans Lotz	Hammer throw	66.14	7
Murray Keen	Javelin throw	68.14	8

Combined events – Decathlon

Athlete	Event	100 m	LJ	SP	HJ	400 m	110H	DT	PV	JT	1500 m	Final	Rank
Stuart Andrews	Result	10.96	6.87	12.92	1.93	49.09	15.71	43.64	4.40	54.26	4:35.01	7512	5
Stuart Andrews	Points	870	783	662	740	857	766	739	731	652	712	7512	5
Peter Fossey	Result	11.08	6.95	12.16	1.96	50.98	16.71	38.08	0.00	0.00	—N/a	DNF	
Peter Fossey	Points	843	802	616	767	770	655	626	—N/a	—N/a	—N/a	DNF	
Simon Shirley	Result	11.22	7.28	11.84	1.99	49.11	15.70	34.58	3.80	55.22	4:21.66	7290	8
Simon Shirley	Points	812	881	597	794	856	767	555	562	666	800	7290	8

Women
Track and road

Athlete	Event	Semifinal		Final	
Athlete	Event	Time	Rank	Time	Rank
Kerry Johnson	100 metres	11.76	5	did not advance	
Maree Chapman	200 metres	23.43	3 Q	23.64	5
Kerry Johnson	200 metres	23.96	5	did not advance	
Sharon Stewart	200 metres	23.83	5	did not advance	
Maree Chapman	400 metres	53.84	3 Q	52.08	6
Debbie Flintoff	400 metres	52.92	1 Q	51.29	(gold)
Sharon Stewart	400 metres	53.91	4 q	53.53	7
Julie Schwass	800 metres	2:03.88	4 q	2:05.14	8
Penny Just	1500 metres	4:27.69	3 Q	4:17.13	7
Jane Flemming	100 metres hurdles	13.45	2 Q	13.69	6
Glynis Nunn	100 metres hurdles	13.31	2 Q	13.44	(bronze)
Jenny Laurendet	100 metres hurdles	13.56	5	did not advance	
Debbie Flintoff	400 metres hurdles	58.06	2 Q	54.94	(gold)
Jenny Laurendet	400 metres hurdles	58.25	1 Q	56.57	(bronze)
Kerry Johnson; Robyn Lorraway; Nicole Boegan; Jane Flemming	4 × 100 metres relay	—N/a		DNF	
Maree Chapman; Sharon Stewart; Julie Schwass; Debbie Flintoff	4 × 400 metres relay	—N/a		3:32.86	(bronze)
Lisa Martin	Marathon	—N/a		2:26.07	(gold)

Field

Athlete	Event	Final	
Athlete	Event	Result	Rank
Chris Stanton	High jump	1.92	(gold)
Vanessa Browne	High jump	1.83	9
Jenny Talbot	High jump	1.75	11
Robyn Lorraway	Long jump	6.35	(bronze)
Nicole Boegman	Long jump	6.06	8
Megan McLean	Long jump	5.86	10
Gael Martin	Shot put	19.00	(gold)
Astra Etienne	Shot put	16.33	6
Gael Martin	Discus throw	56.42	(gold)
Astra Etienne	Discus throw	49.80	8
Sue Howland	Javelin throw	64.74	(bronze)
Jeanette Kieboom	Javelin throw	56.18	4

Combined events – Heptathlon

Athlete	Event	100H	HJ	SP	200 m	LJ	JT	800 m	Final	Rank
Sharon Jaklofsky-Smith	Result	14.90	1.61	11.12	DNS	—N/a			DNF	
Sharon Jaklofsky-Smith	Points	855	747	603	DNS	—N/a			DNF	
Jane Flemming	Result	13.32	1.79	12.70	24.17	6.33	43.12	2:15.63	6278	(silver)
Jane Flemming	Points	1077	966	707	964	953	727		6278	(silver)
Jocelyn Millar-Cubit	Result	13.76	1.76	10.42	24.86	5.84	33.50	—N/a	DNF	
Jocelyn Millar-Cubit	Points	1013	928	557	900	801	543	—N/a	DNF	

== Badminton ==
Athlete	Event	Round of 16	Quarterfinals	Semifinals	Final/ Bronze Medal Match	Rank
Athlete	Event	Opposition Score	Opposition Score	Opposition Score	Opposition Score	Rank
Darren McDonald	Men's singles	Steve Baddeley (ENG); L (15-4, 15-8)	did not advance			
Michael Scandolera	Men's singles	Phil Horne (NZL); L (w/o)	did not advance			
Sze Yu	Men's singles	Glenn Stewart (NZL); W (15-8, 15-1)	Ken Middlemiss (SCO); W (15-4, 15-0)	Nick Yates (ENG); W (15-6, 15-9)	Steve Baddeley (ENG); L (15-8, 15-8)	(silver)
Tracey Small	Women's singles	Linda Cloutier (CAN); L (11-2, 11-9)	did not advance			
Rhonda Cator	Women's singles	Gillian Clark (ENG); L (11-3, 11-4)	did not advance			
Darren McDonald; Gordon Lang	Men's doubles	Peter Ferguson; George Stephenson (NIR); W (11-15, 15-4, 18-16)	Andy Goode; Nigel Tier (ENG); L (13-15, 15-8, 15-10)	did not advance		
Michael Scandolera; Paul Kong	Men's doubles	Paul Martin; Ian Anderson (IOM); W (15-2, 15-1)	Lyndon Williams; Chris Rees (WAL); W (18-13, 15-12)	Billy Gilliland; Dan Travers (SCO); L (15-9, 9-15, 15-2)	did not advance	
Rhonda Cator; Audrey Tuckey	Women's doubles	Bridget Hunt; Susan Gammle (GUE); W (15-7, 15-5)	Johanne Falardeau; Denyse Julien (CAN); L (18-13, 15-11)	did not advance		
Karen Jupp; Tracey Small	Women's doubles	Wendy Luxton; Frances Smith (GUE); W (12-15, 15-4, 15-6)	Gillian Clark; Gillian Gowers (ENG); L (15-2, 15-1)	did not advance		
Darren McDonald; Julie McDonald	Mixed doubles	Billy Gilliland; Christine Heatly (SCO); L (17-14, 15-9)	did not advance			
Paul Kong; Tracey Small	Mixed doubles	Andy Goode; Fiona Elliott (ENG); L (15-11, 17-14)	did not advance			
Michael Scandolera; Audrey Tuckey	Mixed doubles	Dan Travers; Ellinor Allen (SCO); W (15-5, 15-0)	Nigel Tier; Gillian Gowers (ENG); W (15-7, 17-15)	Ken Poole; Linda Cloutier (CAN); W (15-12, 12-15, 15-2)	Andy Goode; Fiona Elliott (ENG); W (15-7, 15-5)	(gold)
Australia	Mixed team	—N/a	New Zealand; W 4-1; England; L 3-2	Canada; L 5-0	Scotland; W 3-2	(bronze)

== Boxing ==
Men

Athlete	Event	Quarterfinals	Semifinals	Final	
Athlete	Event	Opposition Result	Opposition Result	Opposition Result	Rank
Roger Spiteri	Featherweight (57kg)	Bill Downey (CAN) L	did not advance		
Brian Williams	Lightweight (60kg)	Joe Jacobs (ENG) L	did not advance		
David Clencie	Light welterweight (63.5kg)	Apelu Ioane (NZL) W	Solomon Kondowe (MAW) W	Howard Grant (CAN) L	(silver)
Darren Obah	Welterweight (67kg)	Joseph Dlamini (SWZ) W Darren Dyer (ENG) L	did not advance		
Rick Finch	Light middleweight (71kg)	George Nyirenda (MAW) W	Alec Mullen (SCO) W	Dan Sherry (CAN) L	(silver)
Jeff Harding	Middleweight (75kg)	Paul Lewis (WAL) W	Patrick Tinney (NIR) W	Rod Douglas (ENG) L	(silver)

== Cycling ==
Men

Athlete	Event	Heat		Quarterfinal		Semifinal		Final/Bronze Medal Match	
Athlete	Event	Time/ Score	Rank	Time/ Score	Result	Time/ Score	Result	Time/ Score	Rank
Martin Vinnicombe	Time trial	—N/a						1:06.23	(gold)
Max Rainsford	Time trial	—N/a						1:07.34	(bronze)
Wayne McCarney	Time trial	—N/a						1:07.42	4
Gary Neiwand	Sprint	Q		2-0	W	2-0	W	W	(gold)
Dean Woods	Individual pursuit	4:43.92	1 Q	4:44.72	W	W		W	(gold)
Michael Turtur	Individual pursuit	4:54.35	3 Q	5:01.21	L	did not advance			
Rik Patterson	Individual pursuit	4:54.88	5 Q	4:53.93	L	did not advance			
Glenn Clarke; Brett Dutton; Wayne McCarney; Dean Woods	Team pursuit	4:24.75	1 Q	—N/a		W		4:26.94	(gold)
Wayne McCarney	10 mile scratch	—N/a						19:40.61	(gold)
Dean Woods	10 mile scratch	—N/a						19:40.61	(silver)
Michael Turtur	10 mile scratch	—N/a						-	7
Glenn Clarke	10 mile scratch	—N/a						-	unplaced
Jeff Leslie	Road race	—N/a						4:08.50	(bronze)
Stephen Hodge	Road race	—N/a						4:11.21	6
Murray Donald; Greg Dwiar; Jeff Leslie; Stephen Rooney	Team time trial	—N/a						2:16.41	4

== Lawn bowls ==
The lawn bowls were held at Balgreen.

Men

Athlete	Event	Round Robin												Rank
Athlete	Event	Score	Score	Score	Score	Score	Score	Score	Score	Score	Score	Score	Score	Rank
Ian Schuback	Singles	David (BOT); W 21 - 4	Young (MAW); L 16 - 21	Fong (FIJ); W 21 - 5	Corsie (SCO); W 21 - 13	Hill (WAL); W 21 - 15	Espie (NIR); W 21 - 20	Dickison (NZL); L 21 - 10	Le Marquand (JEY); W 21 - 10	Bosley (HKG); W 21 - 18	Smith (GGY); W 21 - 15	Wallace (CAN); W 21 - 5	Thomson (ENG); L 21 - 14	(silver)
Arthur Black; Kevin Henricks	Pairs	Botswana; W 24 - 13	Malawi; L 20 - 16	New Zealand; L 23 - 18	Fiji; W 27 - 18	Wales; W 18 - 17	Northern Ireland; L 33 - 19	England; L 21 - 16	Canada; L 21 - 12	Guernsey; L 23 - 19	Hong Kong; L 20 - 19	Jersey; W 27 - 13	Scotland; L 27 - 14	9
Bryce Stewart; Michael Hill; Peter Sardelic; Raymond Laycock	Fours	Botswana; W 27 - 14	Wales; L 19 - 11	Swaziland; L 20 - 19	Scotland; W 22 - 15	Northern Ireland; W 21 - 17	New Zealand; W 23 - 17	Hong Kong; L 35 - 7	Guernsey; L 25 - 18	England; W 17 - 16	Fiji; L 21 - 15	Canada; W 18 - 15	—N/a	9

Women

Athlete	Event	Round Robin												Rank
Athlete	Event	Score	Score	Score	Score	Score	Score	Score	Score	Score	Score	Score	Score	Rank
Greeta Fahey	Singles	Anderson (BOT); L 21 - 4	Bell (NIR); W 21 - 6	Dainton (WAL); L 21 - 19	Lum On (FIJ); L 21 - 19	McCrone (SCO); L 21 - 20	Line (ENG); W 21 - 16	Ryan (NZL); W 21 - 19	Blattman (JER); W 21 - 19	Humphreys (HKG); W 21 - 16	Hunter (CAN); L 21 - 12	le Tissier (GGY); W 21 - 8	—N/a	5
Beryl Godfrey; Hilda Pochon	Pairs	Botswana; W 24 - 16	England; L 22 - 12	Wales; L 28 - 14	Scotland; W 19 - 17	Guernsey; L 24 - 21	Northern Ireland; L 23 - 8	New Zealand; L 19 - 16	Hong Kong; W 22 - 17	Fiji; W 23 - 14	Canada; L 29 - 12	—N/a		9
Patricia Smith; Clarice Power; Betty Schenke; Audrey Hefford	Fours	England; W 18 - 16	New Zealand; W 27 - 13	Wales; L 21 - 18	Swaziland; W 25 - 12	Scotland; L 18 - 14	Northern Ireland; W 25 - 9	Botswana; W 20 - 14	Fiji; W	Malawi; W 23 - 17	Guernsey; W 27 - 13	Canada; W 17 - 15	Hong Kong; L 19 - 14	(silver)

== Rowing ==
Men

Athlete	Event	Heat		Repechage		Final	
Athlete	Event	Time	Rank	Time	Rank	Time	Rank
Richard Powell	Single sculls	7:12.34	1 Q	—N/a		7:32.64	(silver)
Paul Reedy; Brenton Terrell	Double sculls	7:11.28	2	6:40.24	1 Q	6:21.17	(silver)
Iain Belot; Glenn Myler	Coxless pairs	7:31.85	4	7:29.59	4	6:52.34	5
Craig Muller; James Battersby; Neil Myers; David Doyle	Coxless fours	6:47.12	2	Q		6:09.48	4
James Galloway; Michael McKay; Mark Doyle; James Tomkins; Dale Caterson	Coxed fours	6:43.68	3	6:37.37	1 Q	6:10.57	(bronze)
Mark Doyle; Malcolm Batten; James Galloway; Michael McKay; Andrew Cooper; James Tomkins; Ion Popa; Stephen Evans; Dale Caterson	Eights	—N/a				5:44.42	(gold)
Peter Antonie	Lightweight single sculls	7:12.68	1 Q	—N/a		7:16.43	(gold)
Merrick Howes; Simon Cook; Joe Joyce; Brian Digby	Lightweight coxless fours	—N/a				6:27.71	(silver)

Women

Athlete	Event	Final	
Athlete	Event	Time	Rank
Adair Ferguson	Single sculls	7:56.49	4
Alison Smith; Kate Hall	Coxless pairs	7:53.09	(bronze)
Marilyn Kidd; Debbie Bassett; Sue Chapman-Popa; Robyn Grey-Gardner; Kay Lyn Fry	Coxed fours	6:54.31	(silver)
Vicki Spooner; Urszula Kay; Marilyn Kidd; Annelies Voorthuis; Sue Chapman-Popa; Robyn Grey-Gardner; Debbie Bassett; Margot Foster; Kay Lyn Fry	Eights	6:43.69	(gold)
Adair Ferguson	Lightweight single sculls	7:45.49	(gold)
Debbie Clingeleffer; Virginia Lee; Amanda Cross; Gayle Toogood	Lightweight coxless fours	6:59.68	(silver)

== Shooting ==
Open events
Pistol

Athlete	Event	Final	
Athlete	Event	Points	Rank
Phillip Adams	Free Pistol	549	(silver)
Bengt Sandstrom	Free Pistol	545	6
Phillip Adams; Bengt Sandstrom	Free Pistol – Pairs	1085	(bronze)
Phillip Adams	Centre-Fire Pistol	582	(silver)
Roderick Hack	Centre-Fire Pistol	580	(bronze)
Phillip Adams; Roderick Hack	Centre-Fire Pistol – Pairs	1165	(gold)
Pat Murray	Rapid-Fire Pistol	591	(gold)
Jack Mast	Rapid-Fire Pistol	580	7
Pat Murray; Jack Mast	Rapid-Fire Pistol – Pairs	1152	(silver)
Phillip Adams	Air Pistol	572	4
Neil Flavell	Air Pistol	560	11
Phillip Adams; Neil Flavell	Air Pistol – Pairs	1143	(silver)

Rifle

Athlete	Event	Final	
Athlete	Event	Points	Rank
Alan Smith	Rifle Prone	599	(gold)
Donald Brook	Rifle Prone	595	7
Donald Brook; Alan Smith	Rifle Prone – Pairs	1171	(silver)
Donald Brook	Rifle Three Positions	1134	7
Alan Smith	Rifle Three Positions	1125	9
Donald Brook; Alan Smith	Rifle Three Positions – Pairs	2234	4
Stan Golinski	Full Bore Rifle	396	(gold)
Jim Corbett	Full Bore Rifle	395	4
Stan Golinski; Jim Corbett	Full Bore Rifle – Pairs	583	(silver)
Antol Wurfel	Air Rifle	578	4
Wolfgang Jobst	Air Rifle	568	12
Wolfgang Jobst; Antol Wurfel	Air Rifle – Pairs	1152	(silver)

Shotgun

Athlete	Event	Final	
Athlete	Event	Points	Rank
Terry Rumbel	Trap	189	4
Domingo Diaz	Trap	187	8
Terry Rumbel; Domingo Diaz	Trap – Pairs	183	(bronze)
Ian Hale	Skeet	188	11
Alex Crikis	Skeet	186	13
Ian Hale; Alex Crikis	Skeet – Pairs	188	4

== Weightlifting ==
Athlete	Event	Weight Lifted		Total	Rank
Athlete	Event	Snatch	Clean & jerk	Total	Rank
Greg Hayman	52kg	87.5	125	212.5	(gold)
Nick Voukelatos	56kg	110 GR	135	245 GR	(gold)
David Lowenstein	60kg	110	140	250	(silver)
Danny Mudd	60kg	115	0	115	
Ron Laycock	67.5kg	130	177.5	307.5	(silver)
Bill Sellios	75kg	135	167.5	302.5	(gold)
Robert Kabbas	82.5kg	145	180	325	(silver)
Gino Fratangelo	110kg	165	207.5	372.5	(silver)
Dean Lukin	110kg +	170	222.5	392.5	(gold)
Charles Garzarella	110kg +	152.5	190	342.5	(bronze)

== Wrestling ==
Athlete	Event	Group rounds		Finals	
Athlete	Event	Opposition Result	Opposition Result	Opposition Result	Rank
James McAlary	Flyweight (52kg)	Shane Stannett (NZL) W	Jesmond Giordmania (MLT) W	Chris Woodcroft (CAN) L	(silver)
Paul Kirkby	Bantamweight (57kg)	Brian Aspen (ENG) L	Mitch Ostberg (CAN) L	Paul Ferrugia (MLT) W	5
Dan Cumming	Featherweight (62kg)	Gavin Beswick (ENG) W	Brian Miller (SCO) W	Paul Hughes (CAN) L	(silver)
Zsigi Kelevitz	Lightweight (68kg)	—N/a	Chris McKay (SCO) W	Dave McKay (CAN) L	(silver)
Geoff Marsh	Welterweight (74kg)	Calum McNeill (SCO) W	Zane Coleman (NZL) W	Gary Holmes (CAN) L	(silver)
Wally Koenig	Middleweight (82kg)	—N/a	Paul Beattie (SCO) W	Chris Rinke (CAN) L	(silver)
Alan Thompson	Light heavyweight (90kg)	—N/a	Noel Loban (ENG) L	Graeme English (SCO) L	4
Gabriel Toth	Heavyweight (100kg)	Villame Takayawa (FIJ) W	Clark Davis (CAN) L Ivan Weir (NIR) W	David Kilpin (ENG) L	4
Dru Schaffer	Super heavyweight (130kg)	—N/a	Albert Patrick (SCO) L	Keith Peache (ENG) L	4

== Officials ==
- Chef de Mission & General Manager - Arthur Tunstall
- Assistant General Managers - John Boultbee, Sol Spitalnic
- Manageress Extra Sports - Marjorie Nelson
- Administrative Officer - Peter Anderson
- Transport Officer - Ray Godkin
- Office Assistants - Lynne Bates, Jeanette Brown
- Attache - Kenneth Breechin
- Advance Party - Peggy Tunstall
- Medical - Team Doctors - Dr Christopher Gale, Dr Brian Sando; Physiotherapists - Thomas Dobson, Peter Duras; Masseur - Michael Kewley; Chiropractor - Noel Patterson
- Section Officials
  - Athletics Manager - Ray Drury
  - Assistant Managers - Margaret Mahoney, Maurie Plant, Coach Co-ordinator - John Boas, Tony Benson, Merv Kemp, Norm Osborne, Tony Rice
  - Badminton
    - Manager - Don Stockins
    - Coach - Charles Stapleton
  - Lawn bowls
    - Manager - Roderick Wishart
    - Men's Coach - Kenneth Pearce
    - Ladies Coach - Jean McKinnin
  - Boxing
    - Manager - Leslie Harrod
  - Coach - Bruce Farthing
  - Cycling
    - Manager - Jock Bullen
    - Track Coach - Charlie Walsh
    - Road Coach - Brian Gould
    - Mechanic - Bob Farley
  - Rowing
    - Manager - Stephen Hinchy
    - Assistant Manager/Doctor - Dr Bill Webb
    - Coaches - Reinhold Batschi, Brian Dalton, Geoffrey Hunter, Noel Langton, Robert Marlow, Brian Richardson, Peter Shakespear, David Yates
  - Shooting
    - Manager - Alastair Macpherson
    - Fullbore Coach - John Collinson
    - Smallbore Coach - David MacFarlane
    - Pistol Coach - Tibor Gonczol
    - Clay Target Coach - Peter Quire
  - Swimming
    - Manager - Tom Brazier
    - Assistant Manager - Evelyn Dill-Macky
    - Head Coach - Terry Buck
    - Coaches - Graeme Brown, Joe King, Laurie Lawrence, Bill Sweetenham, Ken Wood; Doctor - Peter Fricker
    - Physiologist - Robert Treffene
    - Psychologist - Jeffrey Bond
  - Diving
    - Manager - Bill Richards
    - Coach - Bruce Prance
  - Synchronised Swimming
    - Manager/Coach - Stephan Critoph
  - Weightlifting
    - Manager - Bruce Walsh
    - Coaches - Lyn Jones, Michael Noonan
  - Wrestling
    - Manager - Reg Marsh
    - Coach - Witold Rejilich

== See also ==
- Australia at the 1984 Summer Olympics
- Australia at the 1988 Summer Olympics
