= Wales at the 1986 Commonwealth Games =

- CG code: WAL
- CGA: Commonwealth Games Wales

in Edinburgh, Scotland
- Medals Ranked 5th: Gold 6 Silver 5 Bronze 12 Total 23

Commonwealth Games appearances (overview)
- 1930; 1934; 1938; 1950; 1954; 1958; 1962; 1966; 1970; 1974; 1978; 1982; 1986; 1990; 1994; 1998; 2002; 2006; 2010; 2014; 2018; 2022; 2026; 2030

Wales competed at the 1986 Commonwealth Games in Edinburgh, Scotland, from 24 July to 2 August 1986.

Wales finished fifth in the medals table with 6 gold, 5 silver and 12 bronze medals.

== Medallists ==
| Medal | Name | Sport | Event |
|---|---|---|---|
| Gold | Kirsty Wade | Athletics | Women's 800 metres |
| Gold | Kirsty Wade | Athletics | Women's 1500 metres |
| Gold | Hafod Thomas; Jim Morgan; Robert Weale; Will Thomas | Lawn bowls | Men's fours |
| Gold | Linda Parker; Linda Evans; Joan Ricketts; Rita Jones | Lawn bowls | Women's fours |
| Gold | Ray Williams | Weightlifting | Men's 60 kg |
| Gold | David Morgan | Weightlifting | Men's 82.5 kg |
| Silver | Colin Jackson | Athletics | Men's 110 metres hurdle |
| Silver | Roger Hackney | Athletics | Men's 3000 metres steeplechase |
| Silver | Venissa Head | Athletics | Women's Discus throw |
| Silver | Neil Haddock | Boxing | Lightweight (60 kg) |
| Silver | Aneurin Evans | Boxing | Super Heavyweight (>91 kg) |
| Bronze | Steve Jones | Athletics | Men's 10,000 metres |
| Bronze | Angela Tooby | Athletics | Women's 10,000 metres |
| Bronze | Helen Miles; Sian Morris; Sallyanne Short; Carmen Smart | Athletics | Women's 4 × 100 metres relay |
| Bronze | Robert Morgan | Aquatics | Men's highboard |
| Bronze | Kerry Webber | Boxing | Flyweight (51 kg) |
| Bronze | Glyn Thomas | Boxing | Light middleweight (71 kg) |
| Bronze | Byron Pullen | Boxing | Light heavyweight (81 kg) |
| Bronze | Terry Wakefield; Colin Harris | Shooting | Open rifle prone – pairs |
| Bronze | Roland Phillips | Shooting | Open trap |
| Bronze | Jeffrey Bryce | Weightlifting | Men's 60 kg |
| Bronze | Neil Taylor | Weightlifting | Men's 75 kg |
| Bronze | Andrew Davies | Weightlifting | Men's 110 kg |

Medals by sport
| Sport | Gold medal | Silver medal | Bronze medal | Total |
| Athletics | 2 | 3 | 3 | 8 |
| Lawn bowls | 2 | 0 | 0 | 2 |
| Weightlifting | 2 | 0 | 3 | 5 |
| Boxing | 0 | 2 | 3 | 5 |
| Aquatics | 0 | 0 | 1 | 1 |
| Shooting | 0 | 0 | 2 | 2 |
| Total | 6 | 5 | 12 | 23 |

Medals by gender
| Gender | Gold medal | Silver medal | Bronze medal | Total |
| Male | 3 | 4 | 8 | 15 |
| Female | 3 | 1 | 2 | 6 |
| Mixed / open | 0 | 0 | 2 | 2 |
| Total | 6 | 5 | 12 | 23 |

== Athletics ==
Men
Track and road

| Athlete | Event | Heat | | Semifinal | | Final | |
| Athlete | Event | Time | Rank | Time | Rank | Time | Rank |
|---|---|---|---|---|---|---|---|
| Mal Edwards | 800 metres | 1:49.81 | 3 Q | 1:49.33 | 4 | 1:47.27 | 5 |
| Paul Williams | 800 metres | 1:52.55 | 4 Q | 1:48.52 | 6 | did not advance | |
| Neil Horsfield | 1500 metres | —N/a | | 3:42.83 | 3 Q | 3:57.08 | 9 |
| Steve Jones | 10,000 metres | —N/a | | | | 28:02.48 | (bronze) |
| Nigel Walker | 110 metres hurdle | —N/a | | 13.64 | 1 Q | 13.69 | 4 |
| Colin Jackson | 110 metres hurdle | —N/a | | 13.69 | 1 Q | 13.42 | (silver) |
| Roger Hackney | 3000 metres steeplechase | —N/a | | | | 8:25.15 | (silver) |
| Ieuan Ellis | Marathon | —N/a | | | | 2:15.12 | 7 |
| Stephen Johnson | 30 kilometres walk | —N/a | | | | 2:21.05 | 8 |

Field

| Athlete | Event | Final | |
| Athlete | Event | Result | Rank |
|---|---|---|---|
| Shaun Pickering | Shot put | 16.79 | 8 |
| Shaun Pickering | Discus throw | 51.30 | 9 |
| Shaun Pickering | Hammer throw | 62.64 | 9 |
| Colin Mackenzie | Javelin | 70.82 | 7 |

Women
Track and road

| Athlete | Event | Semifinal | | Final | |
| Athlete | Event | Time | Rank | Time | Rank |
|---|---|---|---|---|---|
| Sallyanne Short | 100 metres | 11.60 | 5 q | 11.74 | 8 |
| Helen Miles | 100 metres | 11.63 | 6 | did not advance | |
| Carmen Smart | 100 metres | 11.83 | 6 | did not advance | |
| Sian Morris | 200 metres | 23.82 | 4 q | 23.97 | 7 |
| Sallyanne Short | 200 metres | 24.06 | 6 | did not advance | |
| Sian Morris | 400 metres | 54.75 | 5 | did not advance | |
| Kirsty Wade | 800 metres | 2:03.94 | 1 Q | 2:00.94 | (gold) |
| Kirsty Wade | 1500 metres | 4:27.20 | 2 Q | 4:10.91 | (gold) |
| Angela Tooby | 10,000 metres | —N/a | | 32:25.38 | (bronze) |
| Susan Tooby | 10,000 metres | —N/a | | 32:56.78 | 6 |
| Kay Morley | 100 metres hurdles | 13.52 | 4 q | 13.83 | 7 |
| Alyson Vandenbroek-Evans | 400 metres hurdles | 58.83 | 4 q | 58.31 | 8 |
| Helen Miles; Sian Morris; Sallyanne Short; Carmen Smart | 4 × 100 metres relay | —N/a | | 45.37 | (bronze) |

Field

| Athlete | Event | Final | |
| Athlete | Event | Result | Rank |
|---|---|---|---|
| Gillian Regan | Long jump | 6.05 | 9 |
| Venissa Head | Discus throw | 56.20 | (silver) |
| Karen Hough | Javelin | 53.32 | 6 |

== Badminton ==
| Athlete | Event | Round of 16 | Quarterfinals | Semifinals | Final/ Bronze Medal Match | Rank |
| Athlete | Event | Opposition Score | Opposition Score | Opposition Score | Opposition Score | Rank |
|---|---|---|---|---|---|---|
| Phil Sutton | Men's singles | Phil Horne (NZL); L (15–12, 15–11) | did not advance | | | |
| Lesley Roberts | Women's singles | Bridget Hunt (GUE); W (11–2, 11–6) | Fiona Elliott (ENG); L (11–2, 11–1) | did not advance | | |
| Lyndon Williams; Chris Rees | Men's doubles | Yeung Yik Kei; Hung Lai (HKG); W (15–11, 15–8) | Michael Scandolera; Paul Hong (AUS) | did not advance | | |
| Sarah Doody; Lesley Roberts | Women's doubles | Claire Sharpe; Linda Cloutier (CAN); L (15-3, 15-12) | did not advance | | | |
| Lyndon Williams; Sarah Doody | Mixed doubles | Darren McDonald; Julie McDonald (AUS); L (15-11, 15-5) | did not advance | | | |
| Wales; Sutton, Williams, Rees, Doody, Roberts | Mixed team | —N/a | Australia W (3–2); New Zealand L (5–0) | did not advance | | |

== Boxing ==
| Athlete | Event | Quarterfinals | Semifinals | Finals | |
| Athlete | Event | Opposition Result | Opposition Result | Opposition Result | Rank |
|---|---|---|---|---|---|
| Robert Regan | Light flyweight (48kg) | Mark Epton (ENG) L | did not advance | | |
| Kerry Webber | Flyweight (51kg) | —N/a | Leonard Makhanya (SWZ) L | did not advance | (bronze) |
| Sean Ward | Bantamweight (54kg) | Glen Brooks (SCO) L | did not advance | | |
| Antonio Khan | Featherweight (57kg) | Christopher Carleton (NIR) L | did not advance | | |
| Jonathan Alsop | Light welterweight (63.5 kg) | Howard Grant (CAN) L | did not advance | | |
| Neil Haddock | Lightweight (60kg) | —N/a | Lyton Mphande (MAW) W | Asif Dar (CAN) L | (silver) |
| Cliff Piper | Welterweight (67kg) | Darren Dyer (ENG) L | did not advance | | |
| Glyn Thomas | Light middleweight (71kg) | Charles Mahlalela (SWZ) W | Dan Sherry (CAN) L | did not advance | (bronze) |
| Paul Lewis | Middleweight (75kg) | Jeff Harding (AUS) L | did not advance | | |
| Byron Pullen | Light heavyweight (81kg) | Gerald Storey (NIR) W | Harry Lawson (SCO) L | did not advance | (bronze) |
| Kevin McCormack | Heavyweight (91kg) | Douglas Young (SCO) L | did not advance | | |
| Aneurin Evans | Super Heavyweight (>91kg) | —N/a | | Lennox Lewis (CAN) L | (silver) |

== Cycling ==
Men

| Athlete | Event | Heat | | Quarterfinal | | Semifinal | | Final/Bronze Medal Match | |
| Athlete | Event | Time/ Score | Rank | Time/ Score | Result | Time/ Score | Result | Time/ Score | Rank |
|---|---|---|---|---|---|---|---|---|---|
| Steve Paulding | Time trial | —N/a | | | | | | 1:09.73 | 14 |
| Norton Davies | Time trial | —N/a | | | | | | 1:11.90 | 17 |
| Timothy Davies | Time trial | —N/a | | | | | | 1:12.05 | 18 |
| Timothy Davies | Individual pursuit | 5:07.00 | 12 | did not advance | | | | | |
| Mark Adrian Westwood | Individual pursuit | 5:39.28 | 17 | did not advance | | | | | |
| Timothy Davies; Mark Westwood; Norton Davies; Mike Murphy | Team pursuit | 4:56.71 | 5 | did not advance | | | | | |
| Steve Paulding | 10 miles scratch | —N/a | | | | | | - | unplaced |
| Mike Murphy | 10 miles scratch | —N/a | | | | | | - | unplaced |
| Mark Westwood | 10 miles scratch | —N/a | | | | | | - | dnf |
| Norton Davies | 10 miles scratch | —N/a | | | | | | - | dnf |
| Stuart Coles; John Evans; Norman Hughes; Ian Keith Jones | Road team time trial | —N/a | | | | | | 2:26.27 | 8 |
| Stuart Coles | Road race | —N/a | | | | | | 4:12.56 | 12 |
| Ian Keith Jones | Road race | —N/a | | | | | | 4:13.85 | 15 |

== Diving ==
The diving events were held at the Royal Commonwealth Pool.

Men

| Athlete | Event | Final | |
| Athlete | Event | Points | Rank |
|---|---|---|---|
| Robert Morgan | Springboard | 594.12 | 6 |
| Andy Budd | Springboard | 490.77 | 12 |
| Robert Morgan | Highboard | 561.54 | (bronze) |

== Judo ==
Demonstration event only

Men

| Athlete | Events | Club | Medals |
|---|---|---|---|
| Andrew Burt | 95kg half-heavyweight | Afan Lido JC, Port Talbot | |
| Russell Copp | 60kg extra-lightweight | Afan Lido JC, Port Talbot | Bronze medal |
| Ian King | +95kg heavyweight | Afan Lido JC, Port Talbot | |
| Dorian Mansell | 71kg lightweight | Afan Lido JC, Port Talbot | |
| Darren Draper | 71kg lightweight | Ren-Bu-Kai JC, Newport | |
| Mike Reynolds | 78kg half-middleweight | Afan Lido JC, Port Talbot | |
| Alan Tarr | 86kg middleweight | Sekiryukwai JC, Cardiff | |
| Paul Warren | 71kg lightweight | Afan Lido JC,Port Talbot | |
| Craig Weaver | 65kg half-lightweight | Ren-Bu-Kai JC, Newport | |

Women

| Athlete | Events | Club | Medals |
|---|---|---|---|
| Saskia Blair | 72kg half-heavyweight | Sekiryukwai JC, Cardiff | |
| Pavla Bloor | 66kg middleweight | Sanshirokwai JC, Llanelli | |
| Julie Collings | 66kg middleweight | Pembroke Dock | |
| Helen Duston | 48kg extra-lightweight | Sanshirokwai JC, Llanelli | |
| Lisa Griffiths | 52kg half-lightweight | Sanshirokwai JC, Llanelli | Bronze medal |
| Sharon James | 61kg half-middleweight | Sanshirokwai, Llanelli | |
| Helen Morgan | 56kg lightweight | Afan Lido JC, Port Talbot | Bronze medal |
| Diana Price | 72kg half-heavyweight | Afan Lido JC, Port Talbot | |
| Suzanne Simpkins | +72kg heavyweight | Kyo-ei-kai JC, Pontypool | Bronze medal |

== Lawn bowls ==
The lawn bowls were held at Balgreen.

Men

| Athlete | Event | Round Robin | | | | | | | | | | | | Rank |
| Athlete | Event | Score | Score | Score | Score | Score | Score | Score | Score | Score | Score | Score | Score | Rank |
|---|---|---|---|---|---|---|---|---|---|---|---|---|---|---|
| Ray Hill (Aberavon BC) | Singles | Thomson (ENG); L 21 - 19 | Fong (FIJ); W 21-20 | Wallace (CAN); L 21 - 18 | David (BOT); W 21 - 6 | Schuback (AUS); L 21 - 15 | Smith (GUE); W 21 - 6 | Corsie (SCO); L 21 - 14 | Dickison (NZL); L 21 - 15 | Espie (NIR); L 21 - 19 | Young (MAW); W 21 - 15 | Le Marquand (JER); W 21 - 18 | Bosley (HKG); W 21 - 12 | 7 |
| Spencer Wilshire (Tonypandy BC); Lyn Perkins (Tonypandy BC) | Pairs | Canada; L 21 - 14 | England; W 21 - 19 | Botswana; L 19 - 17 | Guernsey; W 26 - 21 | Australia; L 18 - 17 | Hong Kong; W 22 - 13 | Scotland; L 20 - 18 | New Zealand; W 24 - 15 | Fiji; W 22 - 12 | Jersey; W 27 - 17 | Malawi; W 24 - 14 | Northern Ireland; W 19 - 18 | 4 |
| Hafod Thomas (Loughor BC); Jim Morgan (Barry Athletic BC); Robert Weale (Presteigne BC); Will Thomas (Pontrhydyfen BC) | Fours | Canada; D 17 - 17 | England; W 19 - 17 | Australia; W 19 - 11 | Botswana; W 25-17 | Swaziland; W 22 - 13 | Scotland; W 22 - 13 | Fiji; W 21 - 14 | Northern Ireland; L 16 - 13 | New Zealand; W 21 - 15 | Guernsey; W 18 - 16 | Hong Kong; L | —N/a | (gold) |

Women

| Athlete | Event | Round Robin | | | | | | | | | | | | Rank |
| Athlete | Event | Score | Score | Score | Score | Score | Score | Score | Score | Score | Score | Score | Score | Rank |
|---|---|---|---|---|---|---|---|---|---|---|---|---|---|---|
| Ann Dainton (Barry Plastics BC) | Singles | Lum On (FIJ); L 21 - 19 | Line (ENG); L 21 - 13 | Anderson (BOT); W 21 - 19 | Hunter (CAN); W 21 - 1 | Fahey (AUS); W 21 - 19 | Blattman (JER); W 21 - 11 | Humphreys (HKG); L 21 - 13 | McCrone (SCO); L 21 - 19 | Ryan (NZL); L 21 - 5 | Bell (NIR); L 21 - 11 | le Tissier (GUE); W 21 - 3 | —N/a | 10 |
| Janet Ackland (Penarth Belle Vue BC); Margaret Pomeroy (Sophia Gardens BC) | Pairs | Canada; L 19 - 16 | Botswana; W 33 - 6 | Australia; W 28 - 14 | Scotland; W 23 - 17 | England; W 25 - 16 | New Zealand; L 16 - 19 | Northern Ireland; L 24 - 19 | Fiji; W 21 - 12 | Guernsey; L 20 - 17 | Hong Kong; W 22 - 19 | —N/a | | 5 |
| Linda Parker (Knighton BC); Linda Evans (Port Talbot BC); Joan Ricketts (Bailey Park BC); Rita Jones (Gilfach Bargoed BC) | Fours | Botswana; L 21 - 13 | Australia; W 21 - 18 | Hong Kong; W 22 - 17 | Scotland; L 26 - 16 | Swaziland; W 23 - 13 | Guernsey; W 23 - 9 | England; W 25 - 21 | Canada; W 33 - 12 | Northern Ireland; W 25 - 16 | New Zealand; W 17 - 14 | Malawi; W | Fiji; W 18 - 15 | (gold) |

== Rowing ==
Men

| Athlete | Event | Heat | | Repechage | | Final | |
| Athlete | Event | Time | Rank | Time | Rank | Time | Rank |
|---|---|---|---|---|---|---|---|
| Chris Howell | Single sculls | 7:46.49 | 4 | 7:31.03 | 3 Q | 7:50.42 | 6 |
| Lewis Hancock; Robert Luke | Double sculls | 7:44.77 | 4 | 6:56.09 | 4 Q | 6:35.84 | 6 |
| Philip Gregory; Christopher Jones | Coxless pairs | 7:49.39 | 3 | 7:55.70 | 5 Q | 7:00.32 | 6 |
| David Kidwell; Iestyn Roberts; Chris Howell; Martin Hyndman | Coxless fours | 7:10.94 | 4 | 5 | | did not advance | |
| Nicholas Hartland; Paul Taylor; Ivor Lloyd; Michael Partridge; Chris Jenkins | Coxed fours | 7:42.10 | 3 | 6:52.07 | 4 Q | 6:41.07 | 6 |
| Guy Thomas; Iestyn Roberts; Michael Hnatiw; Robin Roberts; Ivor Lloyd; Paul Taylor; Nicholas Hartland; Michael Partridge; Chris Jenkins | Eights | —N/a | | | | 6:20.81 | 6 |
| Robin Williams | Lightweight single sculls | 7:44.83 | 4 | 7:30.75 | 3 Q | 7:35.95 | 4 |
| David Kidwell; Stephen Redwood; Jeremy Edwards; Martin Hyndman | Lightweight coxless fours | —N/a | | | | 6:43.83 | 5 |

Women

| Athlete | Event | Final | |
| Athlete | Event | Time | Rank |
|---|---|---|---|
| Rhian Davies | Single sculls | 8:21.41 | 5 |
| Jo Treweek; Louise Kingsley; Katharine Hartland; Fiona Price | Coxed fours | 7:27.86 | 5 |
| Rhian Davies | Lightweight single sculls | 8:18.24 | 6 |
| Jo Treweek; Louise Kingsley; Katharine Hartland; Fiona Price | Lightweight coxless four | 7:11.70 | 4 |

== Shooting ==
Open events
Pistol

| Athlete | Event | Final | |
| Athlete | Event | Points | Rank |
|---|---|---|---|
| Albie Fox | Free Pistol | 519 | 16 |
| David Nash | Centre-Fire Pistol | 571 | 10 |
| Steven Mitchell | Centre-Fire Pistol | 567 | 13 |
| David Nash; Steven Mitchell | Centre-Fire Pistol – Pairs | 1137 | 5 |
| Gareth Irving | Rapid-Fire Pistol | 582 | 4 |
| Michael Jay | Rapid-Fire Pistol | 576 | 10 |
| Gareth Irving; Michael Jay | Rapid-Fire Pistol – Pairs | 1150 | 4 |

Rifle

| Athlete | Event | Final | |
| Athlete | Event | Points | Rank |
|---|---|---|---|
| Terry Wakefield | Rifle Prone | 596 | 5 |
| Colin Harris | Rifle Prone | 596 | 6 |
| Terry Wakefield; Colin Harris | Rifle Prone – Pairs | 1166 | (bronze) |
| David Arnold | Rifle Three Positions | 1121 | 10 |
| Chris Hockley | Full Bore Rifle | 389 | 12 |
| Chris Hockley; John Vivian | Full Bore Rifle – Pairs | 565 | 10 |
| David Arnold | Air Rifle | 576 | 7 |
| Stuart Daltrey | Air Rifle | 573 | 9 |
| Stuart Daltrey; David Arnold | Air Rifle – Pairs | 1132 | 6 |

Shotgun

| Athlete | Event | Final | |
| Athlete | Event | Points | Rank |
|---|---|---|---|
| Roland Phillips | Trap | 192 | (bronze) |
| Stuart Clubbe | Trap | 184 | 10 |
| Roland Phillips; Stuart Clubbe | Trap – Pairs | 174 | 6 |
| Terry Griffiths | Skeet | 184 | 15 |
| Phil Lewellyn | Skeet | 183 | 17 |
| Terry Griffiths; Phil Lewellyn | Skeet – Pairs | 168 | 10 |

== Swimming ==
Men

| Athlete | Event | Heat | | Final | |
| Athlete | Event | Time | Rank | Time | Rank |
|---|---|---|---|---|---|
| Tony Day | 400 metre freestyle | 3:59.87 | 2 Q | 3:58.20 | 5 |
| Ian Rosser | 400 metre freestyle | 4:09.27 | 5 | did not advance | |
| Steven Gywnne | 400 metre freestyle | 4:05.01 | 6 | did not advance | |
| Steven Gwynne | 1500 metre freestyle | 16:09.71 | 6 | did not advance | |
| Ian Rosser | 100 metre backstroke | 1:00.17 | 6 | did not advance | |
| Gareth Williams | 100 metre backstroke | 1:02.71 | 7 | did not advance | |
| Ian Rosser | 200 metre backstroke | 2:07.49 | 5 | did not advance | |
| Gareth Williams | 200 metre backstroke | 2:12.00 | 6 | did not advance | |
| Bruce Perry | 100 metre breaststroke | 10.60 | 5 | did not advance | |
| Bruce Perry | 200 metre breaststroke | disq. | | did not advance | |
| Gareth Williams | 100 metre butterfly | 1:02.77 | 6 | did not advance | |
| Ian Roser | 200 metre individual medley | 2:12.02 | 4 | did not advance | |
| Tony Day | 400 metre Individual Medley | 4:32.60 | 4 Q | 4:30.02 | 7 |
| Steven Gwynne; Ian Rosser; Bruce Perry; Tony Day | 4x200 metre freestyle relay | —N/a | | 7:54.98 | 5 |
| Ian Rosser; Bruce Perry; Steven Gwynne; Gareth Williams | 4x100 metre medlay relay | 4:09.56 | 4 Q | 4:07.54 | 8 |

Women

| Athlete | Event | Heat | | Final | |
| Athlete | Event | Time | Rank | Time | Rank |
|---|---|---|---|---|---|
| Samantha Lewis | 100 metre freestyle | 1:04.35 | 6 | did not advance | |
| Maxine McKinnell | 100 metre freestyle | 59.70 | 4 | did not advance | |
| Nicky Cumbers | 100 metre freestyle | 1:00.96 | 5 | did not advance | |
| Nicky Cumbers | 400 metre freestyle | 4:31.08 | 6 | did not advance | |
| Nicky Cumbers | 800 metre freestyle | 9:10.76 | 6 | did notadvance | |
| Claire Reeve | 100 metre breaststroke | 1:15.87 | 5 | did not advance | |
| Claire Tucker | 100 metre breaststroke | 1:13.90 | 3 Q | 1:13.94 | 6 |
| Claire Tucker | 200 metre breaststroke | 2:39.39 | 4 | did not advance | |
| Claire Reeve | 200 metre breaststroke | 2:43.74 | 5 | did not advance | |
| Maxine McKinnell | 100 metre butterfly | 1:05.93 | 6 | did not advance | |
| Samantha Lewis | 200 metre butterfly | 2:23.31 | 5 | did not advance | |
| Nicky Cumbers | 200 metre individual medley | disq. | | did not advance | |
| Maxine McKinnell; Samantha Lewis; Claire Tucker; Nicky Cumbers | 4x100 metre freestyle relay | —N/a | | 4:02.99 | 6 |
| Claire Tucker; Claire Reeve; Samantha Lewis; Maxine McKinnell | 4×100 metre medley relay | —N/a | | 4:30.70 | 5 |

== Weightlifting ==
| Athlete | Event | Weight Lifted | | Total | Rank |
| Athlete | Event | Snatch | Clean & jerk | Total | Rank |
|---|---|---|---|---|---|
| Chris Edward | 56kg | 87.5 | 107.5 | 195 | 5 |
| Ray Williams | 60kg | 102.5 | 132.5 | 235.0 | (gold) |
| Jeffrey Bryce | 60kg | 112.5 | 140.0 | 252.5 | (bronze) |
| Neil Taylor | 75kg | 120.0 | 150.0 | 170.0 | (bronze) |
| David Morgan | 82.5kg | 160.0 | 190.0 | 350.0 | (gold) |
| Gareth Hives | 90kg | 120.0 | 160.0 | 280.0 | 6 |
| Andrew Davies | 110kg | 170.0 | 200.0 | 370.0 | (bronze) |
| Steven Wilson | 110kg plus | 152.5 | 187.5 | 340.0 | 4 |
| Kenneth Webster | 110kg plus | 140.0 | 170.0 | 310.0 | 5 |
