= Lorraway =

Lorraway is a surname. Notable people with the surname include:

- Ken Lorraway (1956–2007), Australian triple jumper
- Robyn Lorraway (born 1961), Australian long jumper, wife of Ken
