= Athletics at the 1986 Commonwealth Games – Women's long jump =

Women's long jump event at 1986 Commonwealth Games

Women's long jump at the Commonwealth Games

The women's long jump event at the 1986 Commonwealth Games was held on 1 August at the Meadowbank Stadium in Edinburgh.

== Results ==
| Rank | Name | Nationality | #1 | #2 | #3 | #4 | #5 | #6 | Result | Notes |
|---|---|---|---|---|---|---|---|---|---|---|
| 1st place, gold medalist(s) | Joyce Oladapo | England | 6.43 | x | – | – | – | – | 6.43 | |
| 2nd place, silver medalist(s) | Mary Berkeley | England | x | x | 6.29 | 6.40 | | | 6.40 | |
| 3rd place, bronze medalist(s) | Robyn Lorraway | Australia | x | 6.35 | x | 6.11 | x | 6.27 | 6.35 | |
| 4 | Kim Hagger | England | 6.22 | 6.29 | x | 6.16 | 6.34 | 6.33 | 6.34 | |
| 5 | Sharon Clarke | Canada | x | 5.86 | 6.20 | x | x | | 6.20 | |
| 6 | Jayne Mitchell | New Zealand | 6.01 | 5.97 | 6.07 | | | | 6.19 | |
| 7 | Tracey Smith | Canada | 6.13 | x | | | | | 6.13 | |
| 8 | Nicole Boegman | Australia | 4.93 | x | 6.05 | 6.06 | x | | 6.06 | |
| 9 | Gill Regan | Wales | 6.05 | 5.97 | 5.98 | 5.98 | 5.96 | | 6.05 | |
| 10 | Megan McLean | Australia | 5.74 | 5.86 | | | | | 5.86 | |
| 11 | Linda Spenst | Canada | 5.63 | | | | | | 5.80 | |
| 12 | Lorraine Campbell | Scotland | x | 5.58 | 5.65 | | | | 5.65 | |
