= Athletics at the 1986 Commonwealth Games – Women's 4 × 100 metres relay =

Women's 4 × 100 metres relay at the Commonwealth Games

The women's 4 × 100 metres relay event at the 1986 Commonwealth Games was held on 2 August at the Meadowbank Stadium in Edinburgh.

== Results ==
| Rank | Lane | Nation | Athletes | Time | Notes |
|---|---|---|---|---|---|
| 1st place, gold medalist(s) | 2 | England | Paula Dunn, Kathy Cook, Joan Baptiste, Heather Oakes | 43.39 | |
| 2nd place, silver medalist(s) | 4 | Canada | Angela Bailey, Esmie Lawrence, Angela Phipps, Angella Issajenko | 43.83 | |
| 3rd place, bronze medalist(s) | 6 | Wales | Helen Miles, Sian Morris, Sallyanne Short, Carmen Smart | 45.37 | |
| 4 | 5 | Scotland | Ann Girvan, Kaye Jeffrey, Angela Bridgeman, Sandra Whittaker | 45.84 | |
| | 3 | Australia | Kerry Johnson, Robyn Lorraway, Nicole Boegman, Jane Flemming | DNF | |
