= Athletics at the 1986 Commonwealth Games – Men's 110 metres hurdles =

Men's 110 metres hurdles at the Commonwealth Games

The men's 110 metres hurdles event at the 1986 Commonwealth Games was held on 26 and 27 July at the Meadowbank Stadium in Edinburgh.

== Medalists ==
Gold	Silver	Bronze
Mark McKoy; Canada	Colin Jackson; Wales	Don Wright; Australia

== Results ==
=== Heats ===
Qualification: First 3 of each heat (Q) and the next 2 fastest (q) qualified for the final.

Wind:
Heat 1: +2.9 m/s, Heat 2: +1.8 m/s

Rank	Heat	Name	Nationality	Time	Notes
1	1	Nigel Walker	Wales	13.64	Q
2	1	Mark McKoy	Canada	13.68	Q
3	2	Colin Jackson	Wales	13.69	Q
4	2	Don Wright	Australia	13.77	Q
5	1	Wilbert Greaves	England	13.80	Q
6	2	Jeff Glass	Canada	13.87	Q
7	2	Jon Ridgeon	England	13.88	q
8	1	David Nelson	England	14.13	q
9	1	John Wallace	Scotland	14.23	
10	1	Neil Fraser	Scotland	14.28	
11	2	Glenn MacDonald	Scotland	14.37	
12	2	Kieran Moore	Northern Ireland	14.72	

=== Final ===
Wind: +4.5 m/s

Rank	Lane	Name	Nationality	Time	Notes
1st place, gold medalist(s)	3	Mark McKoy	Canada	13.31	
2nd place, silver medalist(s)	4	Colin Jackson	Wales	13.42	
3rd place, bronze medalist(s)	5	Don Wright	Australia	13.64	
4	6	Nigel Walker	Wales	13.69	
5	8	Jon Ridgeon	England	13.76	
6	1	Wilbert Greaves	England	13.76	
7	7	David Nelson	England	13.97	
8	2	Jeff Glass	Canada	14.39	
