= Joyce Oladapo =

English long jumper (born 1964)

Personal information
- Nationality: British (English)
- Born: 11 February 1964 (age 62) Lambeth, London, England

Sport
- Sport: Athletics
- Club: Bromley Ladies
Medal record
Athletics
Representing England
Commonwealth Games
Gold medal – first place	1986 Edinburgh	long jump

Joyce Elena Oladapo (married name Hepher; born 11 February 1964) is an English retired long jumper.

== Biography ==
Oladapo, born in London, finished second behind Australian Robyn Lorraway in the long jump event at the 1983 WAAA Championships but by virtue of being the highest placed British athlete she became the British long jump champion.

In 1984, she jumped the qualifying distance required to compete at the 1984 Summer Olympics, however she achieved this two days after the British athletics team had been submitted to the International Olympic Committee, and was thus unable to be selected: she instead competed in the long jump at the Friendship Games in Prague, which were held as an event for sportspeople from Communist countries who were boycotting that year's Olympics.

Oladapo won the WAAA title outright at the 1985 WAAA Championships.

Oladapo represented England and won a gold medal in the long jump event, at the 1986 Commonwealth Games in Edinburgh, Scotland.

Her personal best jump was 6.75 m (22 ft 1 1/2 in), achieved in September 1985 in London.

== International competitions ==
Year	Competition	Venue	Position	Event	Notes
1981	European Junior Championships	Utrecht, Netherlands	3rd	Long jump	
1986	Commonwealth Games	Edinburgh, Scotland	1st	Long jump	
