= Mark Doyle (rower) =

Australian rower (born 1963)

Personal information
- Full name: Mark Andrew Doyle
- Born: 29 May 1963 (age 63) Melbourne, Australia
- Education: Xavier College
- Years active: 1982–1988
- Height: 193 cm (6 ft 4 in)
- Weight: 193 cm / 91 kg

Sport
- Sport: Rowing
- Club: Mercantile Rowing Club

Achievements and titles
- National finals: King's Cup 1982-1988
Medal record
Men's rowing
Representing Australia
World Championships
| Gold medal – first place | 1986 Nottingham | M8+ |
Commonwealth Games
| Gold medal – first place | 1986 Edinburgh | Eight |
| Bronze medal – third place | 1986 Edinburgh | Coxed Four |

Mark Andrew Doyle (born 29 May 1963) is an Australian former national champion, World Champion, Olympian and Commonwealth Games gold medal-winning rower.

== Club and state rowing ==
Doyle was born in Melbourne and commenced his rowing career at Xavier College. His senior rowing was with Mercantile Rowing Club where his father Brian Doyle was a club stalwart and coach.

Doyle represented Victoria at the Australian Rowing Championships in the men's Interstate Eight-Oared Championship – the King's Cup on six occasions from 1982 to 1988. He was in consecutive winning Victorian crews from 1985 to 1988.

In Mercantile colours he contested national championship titles at the Australian Rowing Championships on various occasions. He raced for the coxed four title in 1983, and both the men's pair and coxed four in 1982, 1984, 1985, 1986 and 1987. He won the 1986 Australian coxed four championship in a Mercantile crew with his older brother David.

== International representative rowing ==
Doyle's first national representative selection was to the 1982 Match des Seniors in Vienna, Austria – the equivalent at the time of today's World Rowing U23 Championships. Doyle rowed in the coxless pair with his brother David to a gold medal victory.

Doyle's first senior representative selection was to 1986 World Rowing Championships in Nottingham, England. He rowed in the two seat of the victorious Australian men's eight. It was Australia's first and only World Championship title in the men's VIII. That same year at the 1986 Commonwealth Games in Edinburgh, in that same crew Doyle won gold in the Australian men's VIII. Doyle also rowed in a coxed four to a bronze medal at those same games.

At the 1987 World Rowing Championships in Copenhagen Doyle was again in the five seat of Australian eight. That crew placed fourth. For the 1988 Summer Olympics in Seoul, Doyle rowed in the five seat of the men's eight to a fifth placing.
