= Julie Kent (diver) =

Australian diver

Personal information
- Born: 19 April 1965 (age 61) Hobart, Australia
- Children: Michael Joseph Perrone

Sport
- Sport: Diving
Medal record
Representing Australia
Commonwealth Games
Bronze medal – third place	1986 Edinburgh	10m platform

Julie Kent (born 19 April 1965) is a retired Australian diver. She represented Australia at the 1984 and 1988 Olympic Games, as well as the 1982 and 1986 Commonwealth Games. She won a bronze medal in the 10m platform in the 1986 Commonwealth Games. World Age Group Champion 1983, winner of Federation of Australian sport Junior athlete of the year 1983. She was an Australian Institute of Sport scholarship holder.

Kent was a selector for diving Australia for a number of years and managed the most successful Olympic Diving team in at the 2004 Olympic Games.

In 1997, Kent became the first woman president of the Tasmanian Olympic Council. In 2007, she was entered onto the Tasmanian Honour Roll of Women. As of 2019, she was unemployed after running a cafe business for seven years.

Julie Kent is the daughter of late Tasmanian entrepreneur and politician, Michael Kent.
