= Dale Caterson =

Australian rowing cox

Personal information
- Born: 19 July 1961 (age 64) Sydney
- Years active: 1983–1991

Sport
- Sport: Rowing
- Club: Sydney Rowing Club
Medal record
Men's rowing
Representing Australia
World Championships
Gold medal – first place	1986 Nottingham	Eight
Commonwealth Games
Gold medal – first place	1986 Edinburgh	Eight
Bronze medal – third place	1986 Edinburgh	Coxed Four

Dale Caterson (born 19 July 1961) is an Australian former national champion, World Champion, Olympian and Commonwealth Games gold medal-winning rowing coxswain. He is Australia's first World Champion coxswain, having steered the 1986 World Championship men's eight to victory.

== Club and state rowing ==
He was born in Sydney and his senior rowing was with the Sydney Rowing Club.

Caterson was first selected to steer a New South Wales state crew in the 1983 men's Interstate Eight-Oared Championship racing for the King's Cup. He again coxed New South Wales King's Cup eights in 1984 (to victory), 1985, 1987, 1990 and 1991.

He steered Mosman and composite coxed fours in national title attempts at the Australian Rowing Championships in 1983, 1985 (to victory), 1987 and 1988.

== International representative rowing ==
Caterson's first World Championship national representation was in the men's lightweight eight at the 1984 World Rowing Championships in Montreal, a lightweight only regatta being an Olympic year. The following year at Hazewinkel 1985 he coxed the Australian heavyweight men's eight who placed ninth.

At the 1986 World Rowing Championships in Nottingham, England, Caterson steered the Australian men's eight to a gold medal. It was Australia's first and only World Championship title in the men's heavyweight eight and Caterson became the first coxswain to steer an Australian coxed boat to a world title. That same year at the 1986 Commonwealth Games in Edinburgh, that same crew with Caterson in the stern also won gold in the Australian men's eight. Caterson also steered a coxed four to a bronze medal at those same games.

At the 1987 World Rowing Championships in Copenhagen Caterson coxed the Australian eight to a fourth place and he held his role in the men's eight for the 1988 Summer Olympics in Seoul. That crew placed fifth. He took a break after the Olympics but was back on the water at state and national level in 1990. His final national representative coxing duties were in the Australian men's eight at both the 1990 and 1991 World Rowing Championships.
