= Athletics at the 1986 Commonwealth Games – Women's heptathlon =

Women's heptathlon at the Commonwealth Games

The women's heptathlon event at the 1986 Commonwealth Games was held on 26 and 27 July at the Meadowbank Stadium in Edinburgh.

== Results ==
The highest mark recorded in each event is highlighted in yellow

Rank	Athlete	Nationality	100m H	HJ	SP	200m	LJ	JT	800m	Points	Notes
1st place, gold medalist(s)	Judy Simpson	England	13.11	1.85	14.36	24.99	6.21	36.52	2:13.72	6282w	
2nd place, silver medalist(s)	Jane Flemming	Australia	13.32	1.79	12.70	24.17	6.33	43.12	2:15.63	6278w	
3rd place, bronze medalist(s)	Kim Hagger	England	13.45	1.79	12.20	25.02	6.30	35.72	2:28.49	5823w	
4	Joanne Mulliner	England	14.31	1.79	12.91	25.35	5.81	35.24	2:20.68	5659w	
5	Linda Spenst	Canada	13.82	1.73	9.95	25.50	5.93	40.30	2:16.52	5634	
6	Terry Genge	New Zealand	13.92	1.61	13.22	25.60	6.02	34.68	2:14.62	5632	
7	Lyn Osmers	New Zealand	15.21	1.79	11.33	26.38	5.75	48.74		5511	
8	Val Walsh	Scotland	14.26	1.76	11.11	25.59	5.51	36.82		5420	
	Jocelyn Millar-Cubit	Australia	13.76	1.76	10.42	24.86	5.84	33.30	DNS	DNF	
	Alison Armstrong	Canada	14.68	1.70	12.73	26.78	5.31	DNS	–	DNF	
	Sharon Jaklofsky-Smith	Australia	14.90	1.61	11.12	DNS	–	–	–	DNF	
