= Art Boileau =

Canadian long-distance runner

Arthur Boileau
Personal information
- Born: October 9, 1957 (age 68) Edmonton, Alberta, Canada
- Home town: North Vancouver, British Columbia, Canada

Sport
- Sport: Running
- Event(s): 10,000 metres, Half Marathon, Marathon
- College team: University of Oregon

Arthur Boileau (born October 9, 1957) is a Canadian long-distance runner who was a two-time winner of the Los Angeles Marathon, winning in both 1987 and 1989. Boileau also finished 2nd in the 1986 Boston Marathon. He also represented Canada in two consecutive Summer Olympics in the men's marathon. In the 1984 Summer Olympics in Los Angeles, California, he finished in 44th, and four years later in Seoul, South Korea he placed 28th. Born in Edmonton, Alberta, Boileau is currently a resident of North Vancouver, British Columbia.

== Achievements ==
Year	Competition	Venue	Position	Event	Notes
Representing Canada
1981	Fukuoka Marathon	Fukuoka, Japan	10th	Marathon	2:13:31
1983	World Championships	Helsinki, Finland	11th	Marathon	2:11:30
1984	Olympic Games	Los Angeles, United States	44th	Marathon	2:22:43
1986	Boston Marathon	Boston, United States	2nd	Marathon	2:11:15
1986	Commonwealth Games	Edinburgh, Scotland	5th	Marathon	2:12:58
1987	Los Angeles Marathon	Los Angeles, United States	1st	Marathon	2:13:08
1988	Olympic Games	Seoul, South Korea	28th	Marathon	2:18:20
1989	Los Angeles Marathon	Los Angeles, United States	1st	Marathon	2:13:01
1993	World Championships	Stuttgart, Germany	26th	Marathon	2:27:30

== See also ==
- Canadian records in track and field
