= James Galloway (rower) =

Australian rower (born 1964)

James Galloway OAM
Personal information
- Born: 11 April 1964 (age 62) Canberra, Australia
- Education: Telopea Park School; Narrabundah College
- Years active: 1982–1988

Sport
- Sport: Rowing
- Club: Canberra Rowing Club
Medal record
Men's rowing
Representing Australia
World Championships
Gold medal – first place	1986 Nottingham	M8+
Commonwealth Games
Gold medal – first place	1986 Edinburgh	Eight
Bronze medal – third place	1986 Edinburgh	Coxed Four

James Galloway (born 11 April 1964) is an Australian former national champion, World Champion and Commonwealth Games gold medal-winning rower.

== Club and state rowing ==
Galloway was born in Canberra and commenced his rowing career at Telopea Park School and in his senior years at Narrabundah College. His senior club rowing was with the Canberra Rowing Club and the Australian Institute of Sport where he was on a full scholarship from 1985 to 1988.

Galloway's first national title was won when he was still at school. He won a junior title at the 1982 Australian Rowing Championships in an u/19 pair. The following year he won a national u/23 title in a composite coxed four. In 1984 he teamed again with his Narrabundah partner Paul Thompson to win an u/23 coxless pair title at the Australian Championships.

Galloway competed only once in the men's Interstate Eight-Oared Championship at the Australian Rowing Championships – the King's Cup. He raced in the New South Wales 1988 crew.

== International representative rowing ==
National representative selection came early for Galloway, his 1982 national u/19 title win saw him selected with his Canberra partner Paul Thompson to the 1982 World Rowing Junior Championships in Piediluco, Italy where they placed fourth.

Galloway's first senior representative selection was to the 1986 World Rowing Championships in Nottingham, England. He rowed in the bow seat of the victorious Australian men's eight. It was Australia's first and only World Championship title in the men's VIII. That same year at the 1986 Commonwealth Games in Edinburgh, in that same crew Galloway won gold in the Australian men's VIII and also rowed to a bronze medal in a coxed four.

At the 1987 World Rowing Championships in Copenhagen Galloway was picked in the coxed four who placed eighth.

Galloway's final Australian representative appearance was in the men's eight selected for the 1988 Summer Olympics. Galloway rowed in the bow seat of the eight who placed fifth in the Olympic final.
