= Adair Ferguson =

Australian rower

Personal information
- Born: 5 October 1955 (age 70)

Sport
- Sport: Rowing
- Club: Commercial Rowing Club
Medal record
Women's rowing
Representing Australia
World Rowing Championships
Gold medal – first place	1985 Hazelwinkel	LW1X
Commonwealth Games
Gold medal – first place	1986 Edinburgh	LW1X

Adair Janelle Ferguson OAM (born 5 October 1955) is an Australian former World Champion lightweight rower. She became Australia's first female world champion rower in 1985 in only her second year of rowing.

== Club and state rowing ==
Ferguson had represented Queensland in cross country running before taking up rowing with the Commercial Rowing Club in Brisbane at the age of 29 and winning various Queensland titles in 1984, her first year.

In 1985, only her second season of rowing and her first as a sculler, she was undefeated throughout Australia and at the 1985 Australian Rowing Championships won the national lightweight single scull title and also raced in an open-weight double scull to second place. At the Interstate Regatta at those same championships she represented Queensland for the women's national single sculling title and won the Nell Slatter Trophy. She repeated this feat in 1988 and 1990. She was the Australian lightweight sculls champion in 1985 and 1989; the heavyweight sculls champion in 1986; and shared the double sculls title in 1986 and 1988.

After a break and motherhood Ferguson returned to rowing at the elite national level in the mid 90s. She again won the Australian national lightweight single sculls title in 1993 and 1994.

== National representative rowing ==
Ferguson's stellar rise at the 1985 nationals saw her selected to represent Australia at the 1985 World Rowing Championships at Hazewinkel. She beat her fancied Romanian rival Maria Micșa and in the process became Australia's first ever female rowing world champion. She attempted to defend her title at Nottingham 1986 but finished fifth.

Ferguson won two selection trials for the 1986 Edinburgh Commonwealth Games - the New South Wales and Victorian titles. She was picked in that squad, went to Edinburgh but contracted a virus and was laid up in bed in the lead-up to the event. Her main competition was the New Zealand sculler, Philippa Baker who passed Ferguson with 800m to go. Ferguson summoned all her resources to get to the front and won the gold medal in a tight finish.

Ferguson made national selection in the late 1980s and raced the lightweight single scull at Bled 1989 and Lake Barrington 1990.

Ferguson represented Australia eight times at various international competitions but never at an Olympic Games. 1988 was considered to be her best chance of winning a medal but that year the Australian selectors decided not to send any female rowing competitors.

== Accolades ==
She was named the 1985 Australian Athlete of the Year; in achieving the honour she beat fellow nominees Jeff Fenech and Allan Border.

In 1986 she was admitted to the Sport Australia Hall of Fame. In 1987 she was awarded the Medal of the Order of Australia (OAM) for her services to rowing.

== After rowing ==
Ferguson has degrees in medicine, science and human movement, and a graduate diploma in nutritional science. She practices as a general practitioner and is a Fellow of the Royal Australian College of General Practitioners.

She stood as the Australian Democrats candidate in the blue ribbon Liberal seat of Ryan in the 1990 federal election.
