= Athletics at the 1986 Commonwealth Games – Men's pole vault =

Men's pole vault at the Commonwealth Games

The men's pole vault event at the 1986 Commonwealth Games was held on 1 August at the Meadowbank Stadium in Edinburgh.

== Results ==
| Rank | Name | Nationality | 4.45 | 4.75 | 4.90 | 5.00 | 5.10 | 5.20 | 5.30 | 5.40 | Result | Notes |
|---|---|---|---|---|---|---|---|---|---|---|---|---|
| 1st place, gold medalist(s) | Andy Ashurst | England | – | – | xo | o | – | o | o | xxx | 5.30 | GR |
| 2nd place, silver medalist(s) | Bob Ferguson | Canada | | | | | | | | | 5.20 | |
| 3rd place, bronze medalist(s) | Neil Honey | Australia | – | – | o | o | o | xo | xxx | | 5.20 | |
| 4 | Dave Steen | Canada | | | | | | | | | 5.10 | |
| 5 | Brian Hooper | England | – | – | – | o | – | xxx | | | 5.00 | |
| 6 | Daley Thompson | England | – | – | o | – | xxx | | | | 4.90 | |
| 7 | Simon Arkell | Australia | | | | | | | | | 4.75 | |
| 8 | Brad McStravick | Scotland | | | | | | | | | 4.45 | |
| | Steve Wilson | Australia | | | | | | | | | NM | |
