= Deborah Clingeleffer =

Australian rower

Debbie Clingeleffer
Personal information
- Full name: Deborah Heather Clingeleffer-Woodford
- Born: 15 July 1959 Sydney, Australia
- Died: 10 May 2016 (aged 66) Geelong, Victoria

Sport
- Sport: Rowing
Medal record
Women's rowing
Representing Australia
Commonwealth Games
Silver medal – second place	1986 Edinburgh	Lwt W4-

Deborah Heather Clingeleffer-Woodford (15 July 1959 – 10 May 2016) was an Australian representative lightweight rower and educator. She won a silver medal at the 1986 Commonwealth Games in a lightweight coxless four.

== Club and state rowing ==
Clingeleffer was born in Sydney, Australia and attended Sydney University. Her senior rowing was from the Mosman Rowing Club. In later life she rowed from the Corio Bay Rowing Club in Geelong.

She made her representative debut for New South Wales racing for the 1986 Women's Lightweight Four Championship (the Victoria Cup) at the Australian Rowing Championships. She raced in another Victoria Cup lightweight four for New South Wales in 1987 to a silver medal. At the 1986 and 1987 Australian Rowing Championships in Mosman colours she contested the Australian lightweight coxless four title, taking the solver medal in 1987.

== National representative rowing ==
Clingeleffer made her Australian representative debut at the 1986 Commonwealth Games when she was selected in the three seat of Australia's lightweight four which rowed to a silver medal. The Australian squad carried on from the Commonwealth Games to the 1986 World Rowing Championships and Clingeleffer kept her seat in the lightweight women's four which finished in fourth place at Nottingham.

Clingeleffer stayed in the Australian lightweight squad into 1987 and made the trip to the 1987 World Rowing Championships. She ended up a reserve for the lightweight four and did not race in Copenhagen.

== Educator ==
Clingeleffer taught at Geelong Grammar School from 1991 to 2016 and was Director of Learning there from 2003 until her death. She coached numerous Geelong Grammar girls crews. She died from a blood clot complication following surgery on a broken leg which she suffered at a school staff netball game in April 2016.
