= Angela Russell (swimmer) =

Australian swimmer

Personal information
- Born: 2 March 1967 (age 59)

Sport
- Sport: Swimming
- Strokes: Freestyle
Medal record
Women's swimming
Representing Australia
Commonwealth Games
Silver medal – second place	1982 Brisbane	100 m freestyle
Silver medal – second place	1986 Edinburgh	100 m freestyle
Bronze medal – third place	1986 Edinburgh	4×100 m freestyle
Bronze medal – third place	1986 Edinburgh	4×100 m medley
Pan Pacific Championships
Silver medal – second place	1985 Tokyo	4×100 m freestyle
Bronze medal – third place	1985 Tokyo	50 m freestyle

Angela Mary Russell (born 2 March 1967) is a former Australian freestyle swimmer. She competed in three events at the 1984 Summer Olympics.
