= Ken Lorraway =

Australian triple jumper

Personal information
- Nationality: Australian
- Born: 6 February 1956 Wagga Wagga, Australia
- Died: 4 January 2007 (aged 50) Canberra, Australia
- Height: 181 cm (5 ft 11 in)
- Weight: 78 kg (172 lb)

Sport
- Sport: Athletics
- Event: Triple jump
- Club: ACT

Kenneth John Lorraway (6 February 1956 – 4 January 2007) was an Australian triple jumper, who represented his native country twice at the Summer Olympics: 1980 and 1984 and Commonwealth Games: 1978 and 1982. His best Olympic result was finishing in 8th place in Moscow, USSR with a leap of 16.44 metres.

== Biography ==
He was born in Wagga Wagga, New South Wales. He attended Watson High School in Canberra and participated in junior athletics with the North Canberra Athletic Club. Between 1974 and 1978, he attended the Southern Illinois University in the United States on an athletic scholarship. In 1978, he was selected as an All American. He won the silver medal at the 1982 Commonwealth Games after an epic battle with Keith Connor. He won Australian national senior triple jump title five times between 1979/80 to 1984/84. He was also a successful long jumper. He was an inaugural athletics scholarship holder at the Australian Institute of Sport (AIS) where he was coached by Kelvin Giles.

Lorraway won the British AAA Championships title in the triple jump event at the 1982 AAA Championships.

He married AIS long jumper Robyn Strong, a silver medallist at the 1982 Commonwealth Games. They had three children - two boys Alex and Sebastian and a daughter Madeline. Alex has followed in his father's footsteps as a triple jumper. In 1997, he was inducted into the ACT Sports Hall of Fame.

Lorraway died in Canberra, aged fifty, of a suspected heart attack.

== Achievements ==
Year	Competition	Venue	Position	Event	Notes
Representing Australia
1978	Commonwealth Games	Edmonton, Canada	4th	Triple Jump	16.27 m
1978	Commonwealth Games	Edmonton, Canada	8th	Long Jump	7.57 m
1980	Olympic Games	Moscow, Soviet Union	8th	Triple Jump	16.44 m final; 16.80 m Final
1982	Commonwealth Games	Brisbane, Australia	2nd	Triple Jump	17.54 m
1984	Olympic Games	Los Angeles, United States	19th	Triple jump	15.92 m
