= Donald Brook (sport shooter) =

Australian sport shooter

Personal information
- Born: 17 September 1938 (age 87)

Sport
- Sport: Sports shooting
Medal record
Men's shooting
Representing Australia
Commonwealth Games
Silver medal – second place	1986 Edinburgh	Full bore rifle - Pairs

Donald William Brook (born 17 September 1938) is an Australian former sports shooter. He competed at the 1972, 1976 and the 1988 Summer Olympics.
