= Marilyn Kidd =

Australian rower

Marilyn Joan Kidd
Personal information
- Born: 23 November 1964 (age 61)

Sport
- Country: Australia
Medal record
Commonwealth Games
Gold medal – first place	1986 Edinburgh	Eights
Silver medal – second place	1986 Edinburgh	Coxed four

Marilyn Joan Kidd (born 23 November 1964) is an Australian rower.

Kidd competed at the 1986 Commonwealth Games where she won a gold medal in the eights event and a silver medal in the coxed four event.
