= Vlad Slavnic =

Australian discus thrower (born 1958)

Vlad Slavnic (born 10 September 1958) is a retired Australian discus thrower.

He finished seventh at the 1986 Commonwealth Games. Slavnic also became Australian champion in 1982. His personal best throw was 64.10 metres, achieved in January 1988 in Melbourne.
