= Athletics at the 1986 Commonwealth Games – Men's discus throw =

Men's discus throw at the Commonwealth Games

The men's discus throw event at the 1986 Commonwealth Games was held on 1 August at the Meadowbank Stadium in Edinburgh.

== Results ==
Rank	Name	Nationality	#1	#2	#3	#4	#5	#6	Result	Notes
1st place, gold medalist(s)	Ray Lazdins	Canada	56.88	58.86	55.22	58.22	56.52	56.68	58.86	
2nd place, silver medalist(s)	Paul Nandapi	Australia	55.88	57.60	56.06	57.74	55.70		57.74	
3rd place, bronze medalist(s)	Werner Reiterer	Australia	56.94	x	56.16	55.70	57.34		57.34	
4	Paul Mardle	England	53.60	56.90	56.90	55.52	55.46		56.90	
5	Graham Savory	England	56.28	56.42	53.76	55.70	55.50		56.42	
6	Richard Slaney	England	52.60	x	x	x			56.00	
7	Vlad Slavnic	Australia	54.48						54.48	
8	George Patience	Scotland	51.04	x	52.54	51.96	50.58		52.54	
9	Shaun Pickering	Wales							51.30	
10	John Reynolds	Northern Ireland							45.34	
