= Dimity Douglas =

Australian swimmer (born 1970)

Personal information
- Nationality: Australian
- Born: 3 July 1970 (age 55)
- Height: 182 cm (6 ft 0 in)
- Weight: 63 kg (139 lb)

Sport
- Sport: Swimming
- Strokes: Breaststroke
Medal record
Women's swimming
Representing Australia
Commonwealth Games
Bronze medal – third place	1986 Edinburgh	100 m breaststroke
Bronze medal – third place	1986 Edinburgh	200 m breaststroke
Bronze medal – third place	1986 Edinburgh	4 x 100 medley
Pan Pacific Games
Silver medal – second place	1985 Tokyo	4 x 100 medley

Dimity Jean Douglas (born 3 July 1970) is an Australian swimmer. At age 12 years and 56 days, Dimity made history by being the youngest athlete to ever represent Australia at any Games when she competed in the 100m breaststroke at the 1982 Brisbane Commonwealth Games. She went on to compete in three events at the 1984 Summer Olympics, three events at the 1985 Tokyo Pan Pacific Games and three events at the 1986 Edinburgh Commonwealth Games.
