= Deborah Bassett =

Australian rower (born 1965)

Personal information
- Born: 7 December 1965 (age 60)

Sport
- Country: Australia
Medal record
Commonwealth Games
Gold medal – first place	1986 Edinburgh	Eights
Silver medal – second place	1986 Edinburgh	Coxed four

Deborah Bassett (born 7 December 1965) is an Australian rower.

Bassett competed at the 1986 Commonwealth Games where she won a gold medal in the eights event and a silver medal in the coxed four event.
