= Athletics at the 1986 Commonwealth Games – Men's marathon =

Men's marathon at the Commonwealth Games

The men's marathon event at the 1986 Commonwealth Games was held in Edinburgh, Scotland on 1 August 1986.

== Results ==
Rank	Name	Nationality	Time	Notes
1st place, gold medalist(s)	Robert De Castella	Australia	2:10:15	
2nd place, silver medalist(s)	Dave Edge	Canada	2:11:08	
3rd place, bronze medalist(s)	Steve Moneghetti	Australia	2:11:18	
4	John Graham	Scotland	2:12:10	
5	Art Boileau	Canada	2:12:58	
6	Philip O'Brien	England	2:14:54	
7	Ieuan Ellis	Wales	2:15:12	
8	Kevin Forster	England	2:16:36	
9	Martin Deane	Northern Ireland	2:16:49	
10	Fraser Clyne	Scotland	2:17:30	
11	Peter Butler	Canada	2:18:52	
12	Sam Hlawe	Swaziland	2:20:06	
13	John Campbell	New Zealand	2:21:25	
14	Bigboy Matlapeng	Botswana	2:24:05	
15	Grenville Wood	Australia	2:26:48	
16	Kenneth Hlasa	Lesotho	2:29:47	
17	Golekane Mosweu	Botswana	2:33:23	
18	Johnson Mbangiwa	Botswana	2:36:13	
19	Brian Holden	Guernsey	2:39:12	
20	Toka Maama	Lesotho	2:45:13	
	Charles Spedding	England	DNF	
