= Athletics at the 1986 Commonwealth Games – Men's 10,000 metres =

Athletics event

Men's 10,000 metres at the Commonwealth Games

The men's 10,000 metres event at the 1986 Commonwealth Games was held on 26 July 1986 at the Meadowbank Stadium in Edinburgh.

== Results ==
Rank	Name	Nationality	Time	Notes
1st place, gold medalist(s)	Jon Solly	England	27:57.42	
2nd place, silver medalist(s)	Steve Binns	England	27:58.01	
3rd place, bronze medalist(s)	Steve Jones	Wales	28:02.48	
4	Paul McCloy	Canada	28:29.11	
5	Steve Moneghetti	Australia	28:29.20	
6	Paul Williams	Canada	28:41.79	
7	Terry Greene	Northern Ireland	28:47.18	
8	Peter Butler	Canada	28:50.81	
9	John Bowden	New Zealand	29:25.65	
10	Mike McLeod	England	29:57.23	
11	Allister Hutton	Scotland	30:16.50	
12	Jamie Marsh	Guernsey	33:27.28	
	Paul Sheard	Guernsey	DNF	
