= Ray Williams (weightlifter) =

Welsh weightlifter

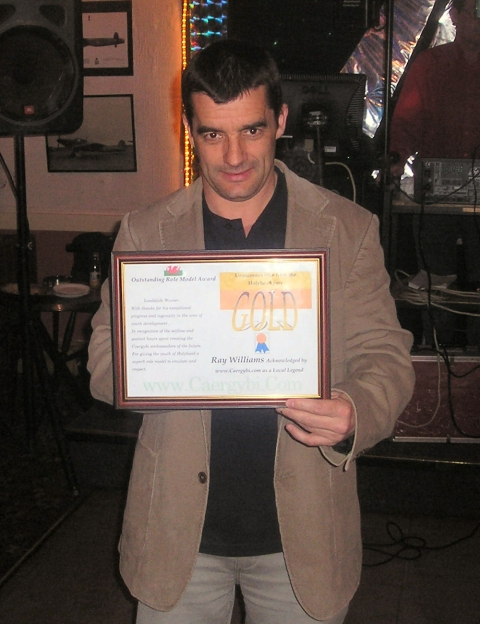
- Ray Williams in 2006

Personal information
- Full name: Raymond Williams
- Born: 9 September 1959 (age 66) Holyhead, Wales
Medal record
Representing Wales
Commonwealth Games
Men’s Weightlifting
Gold medal – first place	1986 Edinburgh	Featherweight - overall

Raymond Williams (born 9 September 1959 in Holyhead, North Wales) is a Welsh weightlifter.

Williams was voted Young Welsh Sports Personality of the Year in 1977 after being placed in the junior weightlifting championships. He joined the army and served with the Royal Welch Fusiliers until 2003.

Returning to the sport, Williams won the Welsh weightlifting championships in 1983 and the Celtic Nations title the following year.

Williams won the gold medal in the featherweight class at the 1986 Commonwealth Games in Edinburgh, beating David Lowenstein of Australia and Jeffrey Brice, a fellow Welshman.

In 2003, Williams was appointed as the first National Weightlifting Coach for Wales.
