= Brian Digby =

Australian former lightweight rower

Sport
- Country: Australia
- Sport: Rowing
- Club: Barwon Rowing Club

Achievements and titles
- National finals: Penrith Cup 1983-1992
Medal record
Men's rowing
Representing Australia
World Rowing Championships
Silver medal – second place	1983 Duisburg	LM8+
Commonwealth Games
Silver medal – second place	1986 Edinburgh	LM4-

Brian Digby is an Australian former lightweight rower. He was an eleven-time national champion, an Australian national representative at seven World Rowing Championships and a Commonwealth Games. He won silver medals at the 1986 Commonwealth Games and at the 1983 World Rowing Championships. For a five year period from 1984 to 1988 he was the consistent stroke of the Australian national champion lightweight coxless four.

== Club and state rowing ==
Digby's senior rowing was from the Barwon Rowing Club in Geelong. He commenced as a coxswain and later moved into lightweight rowing. In 1974 he first made Victorian state selection as the cox of the 1974 Victorian youth eight contesting the Noel Wilkinson Trophy at the Interstate Regatta within the Australian Rowing Championships.

Between 1983 and 1992 he made seven state appearances, all at stroke of the Victorian lightweight coxless four contesting the Penrith Cup at the Interstate Regatta. He led those crews to four victories and three second placings.

In Barwon colours he contested various national championship events at the Australian Rowing Championships throughout the 1980s. He contested the lightweight coxless four in 1982, 1983 and won that event in 1984, 1985, 1986, 1987 and 1988. He won the national title in the lightweight eight in 1983 and 1984. His lightweight coxless four campaigns from 1983 to 1985 were rowed with his brother Bill.

== International representative rowing ==
Digby made his Australian representative debut in the bow seat of the 1983 lightweight eight who contested and won the silver medal the 1983 World Rowing Championships in Duisburg. In 1984 he stroked the Australian lightweight coxless which placed sixth at the 1984 World Rowing Championships in Montreal. In 1985 he was back in the lightweight eight when they placed fifth at the World Championships in Hazewinkel.

In 1986 Digby was selected to stroke the Australian lightweight four for the 1986 Commonwealth Games. That crew won the silver medal and then went on to the 1986 World Rowing Championships where they placed fourth. In 1987 Digby stroked the Australian lightweight eight at the World Championships. They missed the A final and placed eighth overall.

After a two year absence Digby was back at the stern end of the Australian lightweight eight for the 1990 World Rowing Championships at home on Lake Barrington in Tasmania. That crew placed fifth. He made his final national representative appearance at the 1992 World Rowing Championships in Montreal in the coxless four which placed eighth.

All told Digby made seven World Championship appearances for Australia in lightweight crews - five times at stroke.

== Administrator ==
Post-competitive rowing Digby remained involved with the Barwon Rowing Club and the Geelong Rowing Association. He spent 16 years as an administrator of the Geelong Rowing Association and was instrumental in driving improvements and enhancements of the Barwon River rowing course as a regatta venue.
