= Athletics at the 1986 Commonwealth Games – Women's 400 metres =

Women's 400 metres at the Commonwealth Games

The women's 400 metres event at the 1986 Commonwealth Games was held on 26 and 27 July at the Meadowbank Stadium in Edinburgh.

== Medalists ==
| Gold | Silver | Bronze |
|---|---|---|
| Debbie Flintoff; Australia | Jillian Richardson; Canada | Kathy Cook; England |

== Results ==
=== Heats ===
Qualification: First 3 of each heat (Q) and the next 2 fastest (q) qualified for the final.

| Rank | Heat | Name | Nationality | Time | Notes |
|---|---|---|---|---|---|
| 1 | 2 | Debbie Flintoff | Australia | 52.92 | Q |
| 2 | 2 | Jillian Richardson | Canada | 53.11 | Q |
| 3 | 1 | Charmaine Crooks | Canada | 53.39 | Q |
| 4 | 2 | Marita Payne | Canada | 53.51 | Q |
| 5 | 1 | Kathy Cook | England | 53.69 | Q |
| 6 | 1 | Maree Chapman | Australia | 53.84 | Q |
| 7 | 2 | Sharon Stewart | Australia | 53.91 | q |
| 8 | 2 | Angela Piggford | England | 54.18 | q |
| 9 | 1 | Helen Barnett | England | 54.29 | |
| 10 | 1 | Sian Morris | Wales | 54.75 | |
| 11 | 2 | Dawn Kitchen | Scotland | 55.52 | |
| 12 | 1 | Fiona Hargreaves | Scotland | 55.76 | |
| 13 | 1 | Linsey Macdonald | Scotland | 58.26 | |
| 14 | 2 | Mary-Estelle Kapalu | Vanuatu | 58.43 | |

=== Final ===
| Rank | Lane | Name | Nationality | Time | Notes |
|---|---|---|---|---|---|
| 1st place, gold medalist(s) | 6 | Debbie Flintoff | Australia | 51.29 | |
| 2nd place, silver medalist(s) | 3 | Jillian Richardson | Canada | 51.62 | |
| 3rd place, bronze medalist(s) | 8 | Kathy Cook | England | 51.88 | |
| 4 | 4 | Marita Payne | Canada | 52.00 | |
| 5 | 5 | Charmaine Crooks | Canada | 52.02 | |
| 6 | 1 | Maree Chapman | Australia | 52.08 | |
| 7 | 7 | Sharon Stewart | Australia | 53.53 | |
| 8 | 2 | Angela Piggford | England | 53.97 | |
