= Athletics at the 1986 Commonwealth Games – Men's 30 kilometres walk =

Men's 30 kilometres walk at the Commonwealth Games

The men's 10,000 metres event at the 1986 Commonwealth Games was held on 31 July in Edinburgh.

== Results ==
| Rank | Name | Nationality | Time | Notes |
|---|---|---|---|---|
| 1st place, gold medalist(s) | Simon Baker | Australia | 2:07:47 | |
| 2nd place, silver medalist(s) | Guillaume LeBlanc | Canada | 2:08:38 | |
| 3rd place, bronze medalist(s) | Ian McCombie | England | 2:10:36 | |
| 4 | Chris Maddocks | England | 2:12:42 | |
| 5 | Willi Sawall | Australia | 2:14:29 | |
| 6 | Murray Day | New Zealand | 2:15:11 | |
| 7 | Martin Rush | England | 2:16:01 | |
| 8 | Ossie Johnson | Wales | 2:21:05 | |
| 9 | Graham Seatter | New Zealand | 2:22:48 | |
| 10 | Steve Partington | Isle of Man | 2:23:02 | |
| | François Lapointe | Canada | DQ | |
