= Domingo Diaz =

Australian sports shooter

Personal information
- Nationality: Australian
- Born: 4 February 1948 (age 78)

Sport
- Sport: Sports shooting
Medal record
Commonwealth Games
Bronze medal – third place	1986 Edinburgh	Men's Open Trap - Pairs

Domingo Diaz (born 4 February 1948) is an Australian sports shooter. He competed in the mixed trap event at the 1988 Summer Olympics.
