= Wolfgang Jobst =

Australian sports shooter (born 1956)

Personal information
- Nationality: Australian
- Born: 6 October 1956
- Died: 23 August 2022 (aged 65)

Sport
- Sport: Sports shooting
Medal record
Men's shooting
Representing Australia
Commonwealth Games
Silver medal – second place	1986 Edinburgh	Air rifle - Pairs

Wolfgang Jobst (6 October 1956 – 23 August 2022) was an Australian sports shooter. He competed in the men's 10 metre air rifle event at the 1988 Summer Olympics.
