= Athletics at the 1986 Commonwealth Games – Men's shot put =

Men's shot put at the Commonwealth Games

The men's shot put event at the 1986 Commonwealth Games was held on 2 August at the Meadowbank Stadium in Edinburgh.

== Results ==
Rank	Name	Nationality	#1	#2	#3	#4	#5	#6	Result	Notes
1st place, gold medalist(s)	Billy Cole	England	17.02	x	18.15	17.70	18.16	17.92	18.16	
2nd place, silver medalist(s)	Joe Quigley	Australia	17.97	x	16.70	16.79	x	x	17.97	
3rd place, bronze medalist(s)	Stuart Gyngell	Australia	16.37	17.62	17.70	x	x	16.93	17.70	
4	Graham Savory	England							17.31	
5	Rob Venier	Canada	15.66	17.16	16.81				17.26	
6	John Minns	Australia	16.83	16.99	16.58	16.76			16.99	
7	Luby Chambul	Canada	x	16.29	16.86				16.86	
8	Shaun Pickering	Wales	16.40						16.79	
9	Eric Irvine	Scotland							16.73	
10	Andy Vince	England							16.68	
11	John Reynolds	Northern Ireland							15.92	
12	Tony Satchwell	Jersey							15.47	
