= David Doyle (rower) =

Australian rower (born 1961)

Personal information
- Nationality: Australian
- Born: 10 July 1961 (age 64) Melbourne
- Height: 192 cm (6 ft 4 in)
- Weight: 93 kg (205 lb)

Sport
- Country: Australia
- Sport: Rowing
- Club: Mercantile Rowing Club

Achievements and titles
- National finals: King's Cup 2001-2007
Medal record
Representing Australia
World Rowing Championships
Bronze medal – third place	1983 Duisburg	M8+
World Rowing U23 Championships
Gold medal – first place	1982 Vienna	M2-

David Doyle (born 10 July 1961) is an Australian former rower. He was an Australian national champion and U23 world champion, an Olympian and won a bronze medal at the 1983 World Rowing Championships.

== Club and state rowing ==
Doyle was born in Melbourne and commenced his rowing career at Xavier College. His senior rowing was with Mercantile Rowing Club where his father Brian Doyle was a club stalwart and coach.

Doyle represented Victoria at the Australian Rowing Championships in the men's Interstate Eight-Oared Championship – the King's Cup on six occasions from 1981 to 1987. He was in three consecutive King's Cup winning Victorian crews from 1985 to 1987.

In Mercantile colours he contested national championship titles at the Australian Rowing Championships on various occasions. He raced for the coxed four title in 1981 and 1983, and both the men's pair and coxed four in 1982, 1984, 1985, 1986 and 1987. He won the 1986 Australian coxed four championship in 1986 in a Mercantile crew with his younger brother Mark.

== International representative rowing ==
Doyle's first national representative selection was to the 1982 Match des Seniors in Vienna, Austria - the then equivalent of today's World Rowing U23 Championships. Doyle rowed in the coxless pair with his brother Mark to a gold medal victory.

In 1983 Doyle secured a seat in the Australian eight selected within a limited squad sent to the 1983 World Rowing Championships in Duisburg Germany. The eight performed well in lead up regattas at Vichy, Ratzeburg and Nottingham. In the final at the World Championships the Australian crew drew a bad lane and lost the benefit of the tail breeze however they raced a strong second 1000m and finished in third place for a bronze medal.

For the 1984 Los Angeles Olympics Doyle was selected in Australia's coxless four. They showed good form in the lead up competitions but finished in overall eight place in Los Angeles.

== Post rowing ==
Doyle works as an architect in Melbourne.
