= Athletics at the 1986 Commonwealth Games – Women's discus throw =

Women's discus throw at the Commonwealth Games

The women's discus throw event at the 1986 Commonwealth Games was held at the Meadowbank Stadium in Edinburgh on 27 July 1986.

The winning margin was 22 cm which as of 2024 remains the only time the women's discus throw has been won by less than 50 cm at these games.

== Results ==
| Rank | Name | Nationality | #1 | #2 | #3 | #4 | #5 | #6 | Result | Notes |
|---|---|---|---|---|---|---|---|---|---|---|
| 1st place, gold medalist(s) | Gael Martin | Australia | | | | | | | 56.42 | |
| 2nd place, silver medalist(s) | Venissa Head | Wales | | | | | | | 56.20 | |
| 3rd place, bronze medalist(s) | Karen Pugh | England | 54.72 | 52.84 | 53.18 | | | | 54.72 | PB |
| 4 | Julia Avis | England | | 52.48 | 47.04 | | | | 52.48 | |
| 5 | Gale Zaphiropoulos-Dolegiewicz | Canada | | | | | | | 52.28 | |
| 6 | Kathryn Farr | England | | | | | | | 51.08 | |
| 7 | Michelle Brotherton | Canada | | | | | | | 49.84 | |
| 8 | Astra Etiene | Australia | 49.80 | 47.84 | x | | | | 49.80 | |
| 9 | Jackie McKernan | Northern Ireland | 48.46 | 49.08 | | | | | 49.08 | |
| 10 | Melody Torcolacci | Canada | | | | | | | 47.56 | |
| 11 | Morag Bremner | Scotland | | | | | | | 47.06 | |
