= Alan Smith (sport shooter) =

Australian sports shooter

Personal information
- Nationality: Australian
- Born: 8 June 1958 (age 68)

Sport
- Sport: Sports shooting
Medal record
Men's shooting
Representing Australia
Commonwealth Games
Gold medal – first place	1982 Brisbane	Smallbore rifle – Individual
Gold medal – first place	1986 Edinburgh	Small bore rifle
Silver medal – second place	1986 Edinburgh	Small bore rifle - Pairs

Alan Keith Smith (born 8 June 1958) is an Australian sports shooter. He competed at the 1984 Summer Olympics and the 1988 Summer Olympics.
