= Neil Honey =

Australian pole vaulter

Personal information
- Born: 9 April 1963 (age 63)

Sport
- Country: Australia
- Sport: Athletics
- Event: Pole vault
Medal record
Commonwealth Games
Bronze medal – third place	1986 Edinburgh	Pole vault

Neil Honey (born 4 April 1963) is an Australian former athlete who specialised in pole vault.

Honey, a native of Melbourne, attended both Parade College and Keon Park Technical School.

Active in the 1980s, Honey was a three-time national champion in pole vault and had a personal best of 5.35m. He placed sixth in the pole vault at the 1985 IAAF World Cup, won bronze at the 1986 Commonwealth Games and was fourth at the 1990 Commonwealth Games.

Honey, younger brother of long jumper Gary, married Australian netball representative Di Atkinson. One of their daughters Taylor plays netball for the Melbourne Vixens and their son Josh is an AFL player for Carlton.
