= Helen Miles =

Welsh sprinter

Personal information
- Nationality: British (Welsh)
- Born: 2 March 1967 (age 59) Bridgend, Wales
- Height: 160 cm (5 ft 3 in)
- Weight: 55 kg (121 lb)

Sport
- Sport: Athletics
- Event: Sprints
- Club: Cardiff AAC
Medal record
Representing Great Britain
European Junior Championships
Bronze medal – third place	1985 Cottbus	100 metres
Bronze medal – third place	1985 Cottbus	4 x 100 m
Representing Wales
Commonwealth Games
Bronze medal – third place	1986 Edinburgh	4 x 100 m

Helen Louise Miles (born 2 March 1967) is a Welsh former sprinter who competed mainly in the 100 metres. She represented Great Britain at the 1988 Olympic Games in Seoul. In 1985, she won a European Junior bronze medal in the 100 metres.

== Biography ==
Miles was born in Bridgend, Wales. She first came to prominence at the 1985 European Junior Championships in Cottbus, where she won two bronze medals, in the 100 metres, running 11.63 secs and the 4 × 100 m relay.

In 1986, she represented Wales at the Commonwealth Games in Edinburgh, winning a bronze medal in the sprint relay, her teammates were Sian Morris, Sallyanne Short and Carmen Smart.

In 1988, Miles earned Olympic selection in the 100 metres. In Seoul, she was eliminated in the heats running 11.88, after sustaining an injury.

In 2024, Miles and her bronze medal teammates were inducted into the Welsh Athletics Hall of Fame.

== Achievements ==
- 5 Times Welsh 100 metres Champion (1984,88,90,91,93)
- 3 Times Welsh 200 metres Champion (1984,91,93)

Year	Competition	Venue	Position	Event	Notes
Representing Great Britain / Wales
1985	European Junior Championships	Cottbus, East Germany	3rd	100 m	11.63
1985	European Junior Championships	Cottbus, East Germany	3rd	4 × 100 m	44.78
1986	Commonwealth Games	Edinburgh, Scotland	heats	100 m	11.63
1986	Commonwealth Games	Edinburgh, Scotland	3rd	4 × 100 m	45.37
1988	Olympic Games	Seoul, South Korea	heats	100 m	11.83
