= Don Wright (athlete) =

Australian hurdler (born 1959)

Personal information
- Full name: Donald Ernest Wright
- Born: 26 April 1959 (age 67)
Medal record
Men's athletics
Representing Australia
Commonwealth Games
Bronze medal – third place	1982 Brisbane	110 m hurdles
Bronze medal – third place	1986 Edinburgh	110 m hurdles

Donald Ernest Wright (born 26 April 1959) is a retired Australian high hurdler, who reached the semi-finals of his event at the 1983 World Championships and the 1984 Summer Olympics. He was a two-time bronze medallist in at the Commonwealth Games in 1982 and 1986. He is also a seven-time national champion in the 110 m hurdles.

Donald Wright held the prestigious high school record for the 110m hurdles at Warwick State High until it was sensationally broken by Peter Tuthill 8 years after it was set.
