= Aquatics at the 1986 Commonwealth Games =

- Venue: Royal Commonwealth Pool
- Location: Edinburgh, Scotland
- Date: 24 July to 2 August 1986

Aquatics at the 1986 Commonwealth Games was the 13th appearances of both Swimming at the Commonwealth Games and Diving at the Commonwealth Games. However, synchronised swimming made its debut.

Competition featured 4 diving events, 30 swimming events and two synchronised swimming events and was held in Edinburgh, Scotland, from 24 July to 2 August 1986.

The events were held at the Royal Commonwealth Pool, which also hosted the events in 1970.

Canada topped the medal table with 15 gold medals.

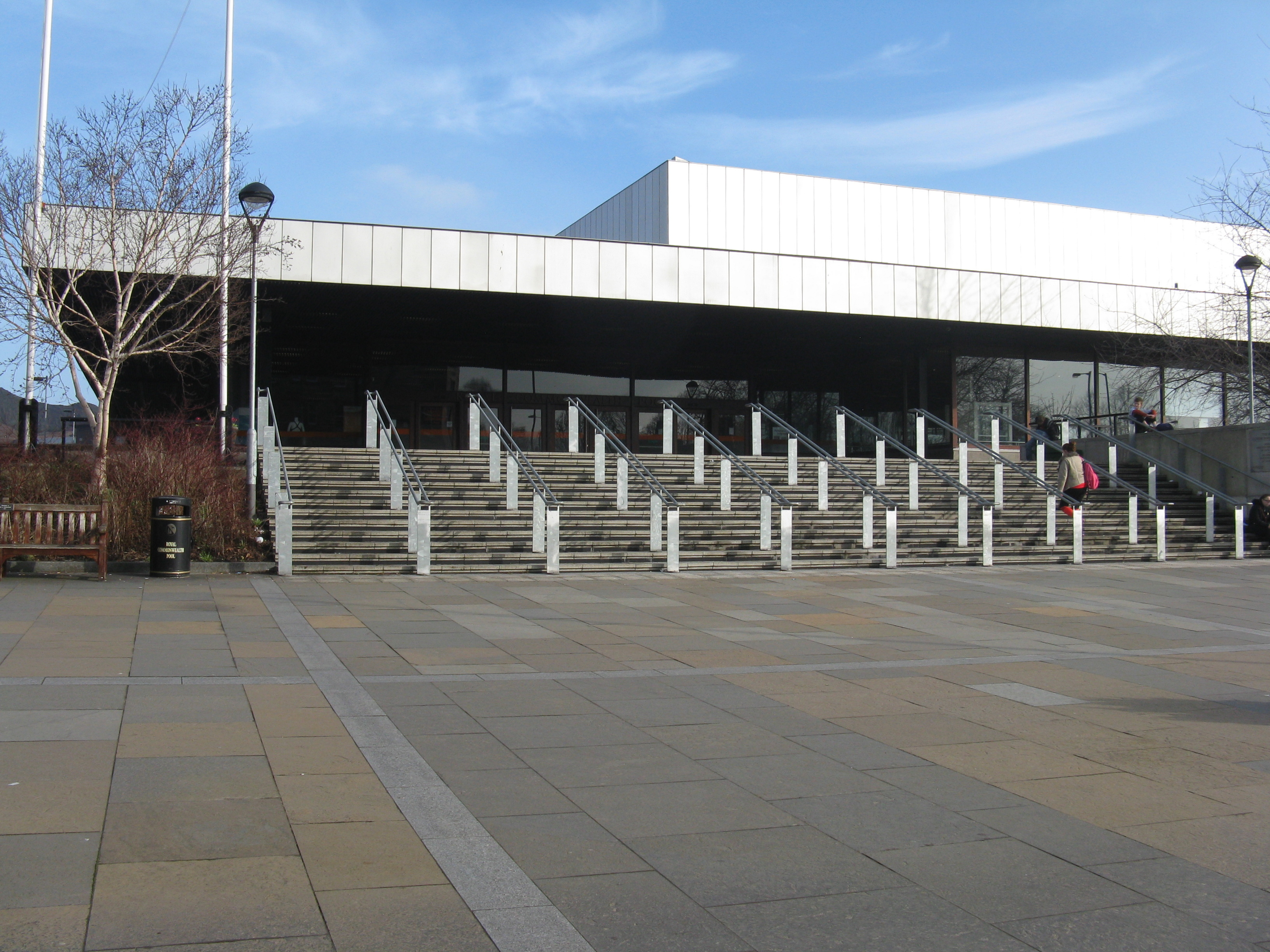
The Royal Commonwealth Pool

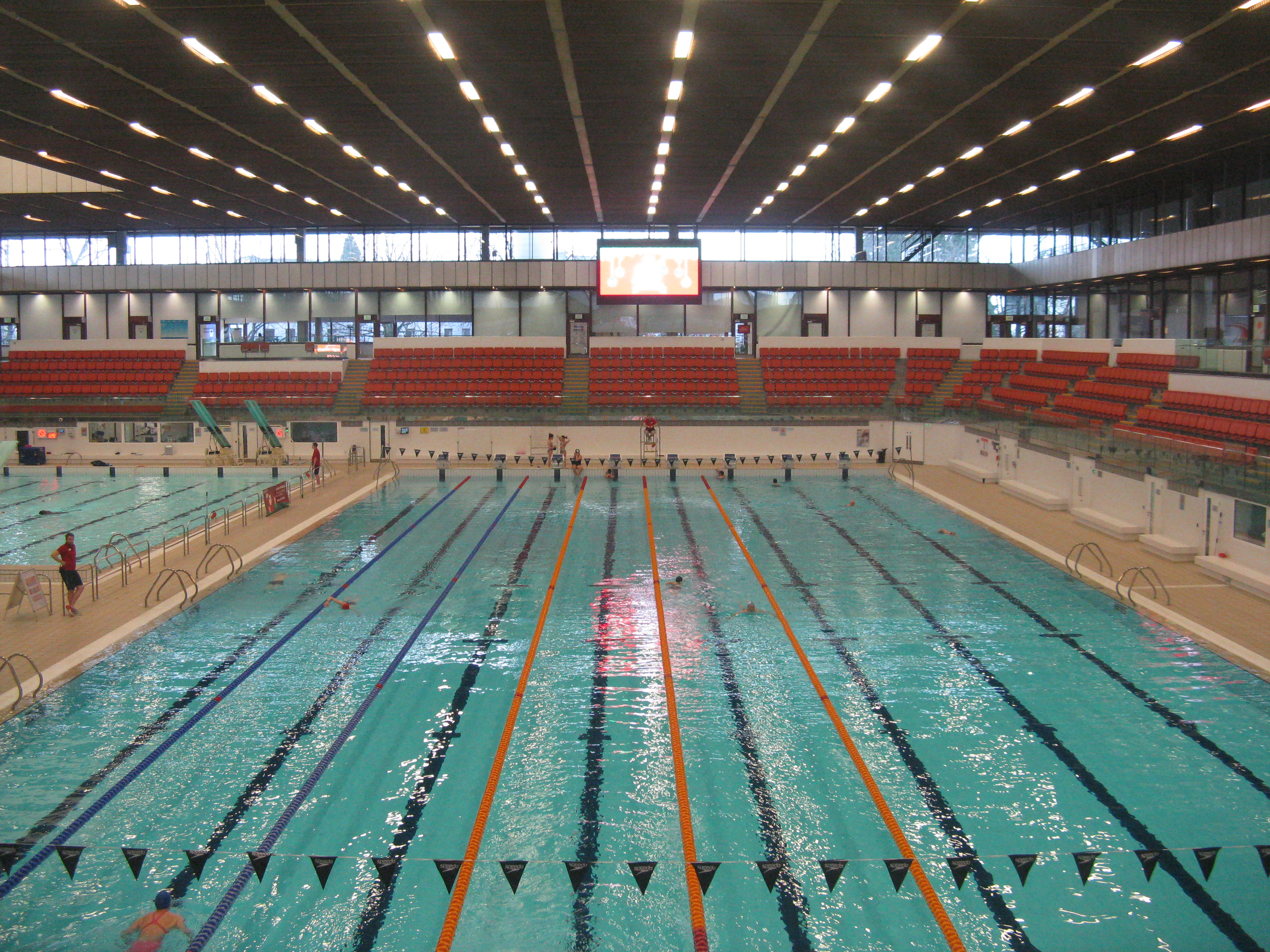
The pool in 2015

== Medal table (all aquatics events) ==
* Host nation (Scotland)

Rank	Nation	Gold	Silver	Bronze	Total
1	Canada	15	9	9	33
2	Australia	13	13	14	40
3	England	6	9	9	24
4	New Zealand	2	3	1	6
5	Scotland*	0	2	2	4
6	Wales	0	0	1	1
Totals (6 entries)		36	36	36	108
