= Stuart Gyngell =

Australian shot put athlete

Personal information
- Born: Stuart Paul Gyngell; 25 November 1963 (age 62)

Sport
- Country: Australia
- Sport: Athletics
- Event: Shot put
Medal record
Commonwealth Games
Bronze medal – third place	1986 Edinburgh	Shot put

Stuart Paul Gyngell (born 25 November 1963) is an Australian former athlete who specialised in shot put.

Gyngell, a Sydney-based thrower, set a national shot put record in 1985 of 18.89m. He was Australia's national title holder in the shot put in both 1985 and 1986. At the 1986 Commonwealth Games in Edinburgh, he claimed a bronze medal in the shot put, finishing behind Billy Cole and Joe Quigley. Soon after he gave up competitive athletics, partly motivated by an ambition to become a Christian minister. He is also qualified as a veterinary surgeon.
