= Sian Morris =

Welsh sprinter

Personal information
- Nationality: British (Welsh)
- Born: 16 June 1965 (age 61) Merthyr Tydfil district, Wales

Sport
- Sport: Athletics
- Event: Sprints
- Club: Port Talbot Harriers; Cardiff AAC
Medal record
Representing Wales
Commonwealth Games
Bronze medal – third place	1986 Edinburgh	4 x 100 m

Sian Morris (born 16 June 1965) is a retired Welsh sprinter.

== Biography ==
In 1980, as a student at Ysgol Gymraeg Ystalyfera Bro Dur, Morris aged 15, won the 100 and 200 metres at the Welsh AAA Championships in Cwmbran. She was running for Port Talbot Harriers at the time.

At the 1986 Commonwealth Games, the most successful games for Wales ever, she won a bronze medal in the 4 × 100 metres relay together with Helen Miles, Sallyanne Short and Carmen Smart. She also finished seventh in the 200 metres, Wales' best ever placement in this event, and competed in the 400 metres without reaching the final.

Morris also became Welsh champion in the 400 metres in 1985 and 1986. Her personal best time in this event was 52.80 seconds, achieved in Finland in 1983 breaking the Welsh under 20 record, a record which is still held. She competed for Great Britain in the European junior championships in 1983. .

In 2024, Morris and her bronze medal teammates were inducted into the Welsh Athletics Hall of Fame.
