= Rowing at the Commonwealth Games =

Rowing is one of the sports at the quadrennial Commonwealth Games competition. It has been a Commonwealth Games sport since 1930. It was held at every edition from 1938 to 1962, but was not held again until 1986, and has not been part of the Games program since. It is an optional sport and may, or may not, be included in the sporting programme of future editions of the Games.

A separate event, the Commonwealth Rowing Championships, has been held in Commonwealth Games years since 2002. Commonwealth Rowing Regatta events were also held in 1994 and 1999.

== Editions ==
Games	Year	Host city	Host country	Best nation
I	1930	Hamilton, Ontario	Canada	England
III	1938	Sydney	Australia	Australia
IV	1950	Auckland	New Zealand	Australia
V	1954	Vancouver	Canada	New Zealand
VI	1958	Cardiff	Wales	England
VII	1962	Perth	Australia	England
XIII	1986	Edinburgh	Scotland	England

== All-time medal table ==
Rank	Nation	Gold	Silver	Bronze	Total
1	Australia	16	10	8	34
2	England	13	12	14	39
3	New Zealand	9	14	7	30
4	Canada	7	7	9	23
5	Wales	0	1	1	2
6	Guyana	0	0	1	1
6	Scotland	0	0	1	1
6	South Africa	0	0	1	1
Totals (8 entries)		45	44	42	131
