= Robyn Lorraway =

Australian long jumper

Robyn Lorraway née Strong
Personal information
- Nationality: Australian
- Born: 20 July 1961 (age 64)
- Height: 168 cm (5 ft 6 in)
- Weight: 54 kg (119 lb)

Sport
- Sport: Athletics
- Event: long jump
Medal record
Athletics
Commonwealth Games
Silver medal – second place	1982 Brisbane	Women's Long Jump
Bronze medal – third place	1986 Edinburgh	Women's Long Jump

Robyn Edna Lorraway, née Strong (born 20 July 1961) was an Australian long jumper from Australia winning medals at the Commonwealth Games and competing at the 1984 Summer Olympics.

== Biography ==
As Robyn Strong, she moved from Victoria to become an inaugural Australian Institute of Sport athletics scholarship holder. She was coached by Kelvin Giles.

Strong won the British WAAA Championships title in the long jump event at the 1982 WAAA Championships and later that year at the 1982 Commonwealth Games in Brisbane, she won the silver medal in the women's long jump.

After the Games, she married Ken Lorraway. At the 1984 Olympic Games in Los Angeles, she finished sixth in the final on the women's long jump. At the 1986 Commonwealth Games in Edinburgh, she won the bronze medal in the long jump.

She won the Australian national Women's Long Jump title in 1983, 1984 and 1986. At the national titles, she came second in the Women's 100 m hurdles from 1979 to 1982.

Her husband Ken died suddenly in 2007. They had three children - two boys Alex and Sebastian and a daughter Madeline. Alex has followed in his father's footsteps as a triple jumper. In 1985, she was ACT Female Sportstar of the Year.
