= Athletics at the 1986 Commonwealth Games =

Athletics at the 13th Commonwealth Games
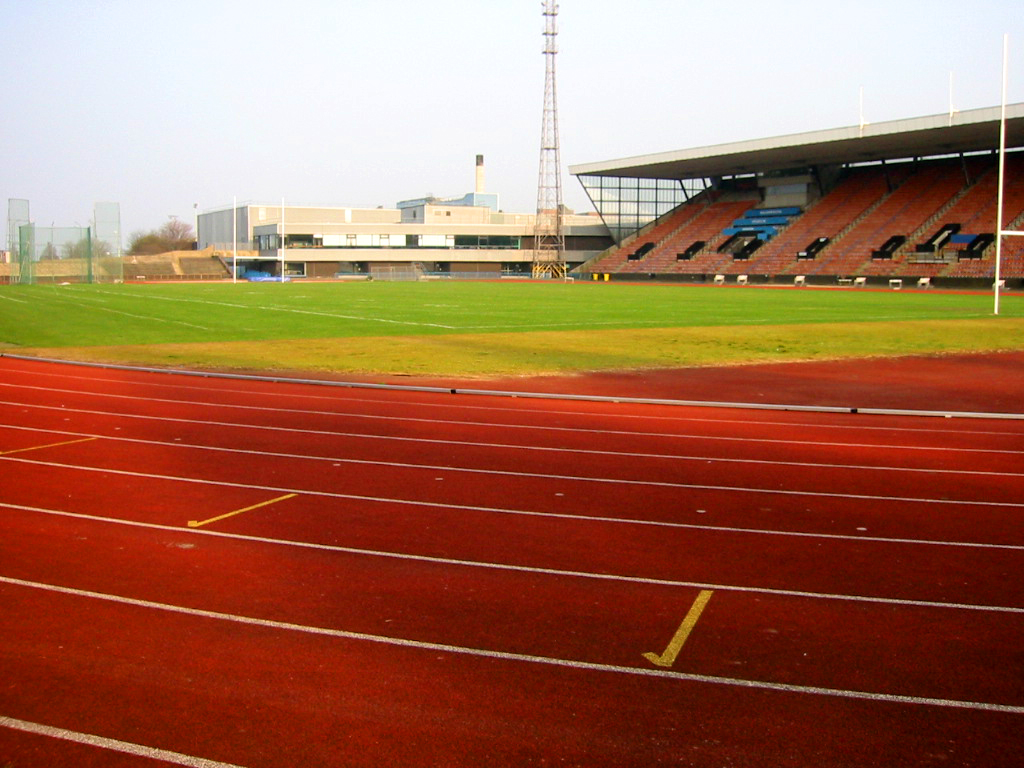
- Dates: 26 July–2 August 1986
- Host city: Edinburgh, Scotland
- Venue: Meadowbank Stadium
- Level: Senior
- Events: 41
- Participation: 417 athletes from 19 nations
- Records set: 5 Games records

At the 1986 Commonwealth Games, the athletics events were held at the Meadowbank Stadium in Edinburgh, Scotland. A total of 41 events were contested, of which 23 by male and 18 by female athletes.

The majority of African, Asian and Caribbean countries boycotted the event due to the United Kingdom's sporting links with apartheid-era South Africa. As a result, the medallists came from only seven nations, comprising the four constituent countries of the UK, Australia, New Zealand and Canada. England easily topped the medal table with eighteen gold medals and 48 medals in total. Canada was second, with ten golds and 28 medals overall, while Australia took third place with nine golds and a total of 26 medals. The hosts Scotland won one gold and six medals while Northern Ireland (typically weak in the sport) had one of their best games, with one gold and four medals overall.

== Medal summary ==
=== Men ===
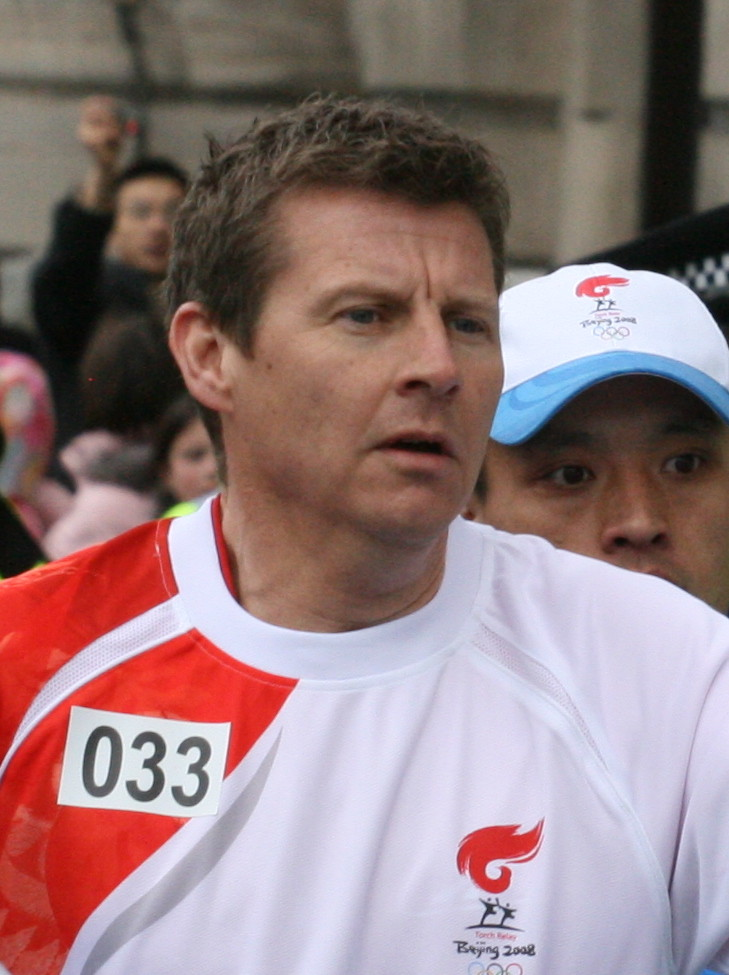
Steve Cram did an 800/1500 m middle-distance double for England.

Event	Gold		Silver		Bronze	
100 metres	Ben Johnson (CAN)	10.07	Linford Christie (ENG)	10.28	Mike McFarlane (ENG)	10.35
200 metres	Atlee Mahorn (CAN)	20.31	Todd Bennett (ENG)	20.54	Ben Johnson (CAN)	20.64
400 metres	Roger Black (ENG)	45.57	Darren Clark (AUS)	45.98	Phil Brown (ENG)	46.80
800 metres	Steve Cram (ENG)	1:43.22 GR	Tom McKean (SCO)	1:44.80	Peter Elliott (ENG)	1:45.42
1500 metres	Steve Cram (ENG)	3:50.87	John Gladwin (ENG)	3:52.17	David Campbell (CAN)	3:54.06
5000 metres	Steve Ovett (ENG)	13:24.11	Jack Buckner (ENG)	13:25.87	Tim Hutchings (ENG)	13:26.84
10,000 metres	Jon Solly (ENG)	27:57.42	Steve Binns (ENG)	27:58.01	Steve Jones (WAL)	28:02.48
Marathon	Rob de Castella (AUS)	2:10:15	Dave Edge (CAN)	2:11:08	Steve Moneghetti (AUS)	2:11:18
3000 metres steeplechase	Graeme Fell (CAN)	8:24.49	Roger Hackney (WAL)	8:25.15	Colin Reitz (ENG)	8:26.14
110 metres hurdles (wind: +4.5 m/s)	Mark McKoy (CAN)	13.31 (w)	Colin Jackson (WAL)	13.42 (w)	Don Wright (AUS)	13.64 (w)
400 metres hurdles	Phil Beattie (NIR)	49.60	Max Robertson (ENG)	49.77	John Graham (CAN)	50.25
4 × 100 metres relay	Canada; Mark McKoy; Atlee Mahorn; Desai Williams; Ben Johnson	39.15	England; Lincoln Asquith; Daley Thompson; Mike McFarlane; Clarence Callender	39.19	Scotland; Jamie Henderson; Cameron Sharp; George McCallum; Elliot Bunney	40.41
4 × 400 metres relay	England; Kriss Akabusi; Roger Black; Todd Bennett; Phil Brown	3:07.19	Australia; Bruce Frayne; Miles Murphy; David Johnston; Darren Clark	3:07.81	Canada; Anton Skerritt; Andre Smith; John Graham; Atlee Mahorn	3:08.69
30 kilometres walk	Simon Baker (AUS)	2:07:47 GR	Guillaume Leblanc (CAN)	2:08:38	Ian McCombie (ENG)	2:10:36
High jump	Milton Ottey (CAN)	2.30 m	Geoff Parsons (SCO)	2.28 m	Alain Metellus (CAN); Henderson Pierre (ENG)	2.14 m
Pole vault	Andy Ashurst (ENG)	5.30 m	Bob Ferguson (CAN)	5.20 m	Neil Honey (AUS)	5.20 m
Long jump	Gary Honey (AUS)	8.08 m	Fred Salle (ENG)	7.83 m	Kyle McDuffie (CAN)	7.79 m
Triple jump	John Herbert (ENG)	17.27 m	Mike Makin (ENG)	16.87 m	Peter Beames (AUS)	16.42 m
Shot put	Billy Cole (ENG)	18.16 m	Joe Quigley (AUS)	17.97 m	Stuart Gyngell (AUS)	17.70 m
Discus throw	Ray Lazdins (CAN)	58.86 m	Paul Nandapi (AUS)	57.74 m	Werner Reiterer (AUS)	57.34 m
Hammer throw	Dave Smith (ENG)	74.06 m	Martin Girvan (NIR)	70.48 m	Phil Spivey (AUS)	70.30 m
Javelin throw	David Ottley (ENG)	80.62 m GR	Mick Hill (ENG)	78.56 m	Gavin Lovegrove (NZL)	76.22 m
Decathlon	Daley Thompson (ENG)	8663 pts GR	Dave Steen (CAN)	8173 pts	Simon Poelman (NZL)	8015 pts

=== Women ===
Event	Gold		Silver		Bronze	
100 metres	Heather Oakes (ENG)	11.20	Paula Dunn (ENG)	11.21	Angella Issajenko (CAN)	11.21
200 metres	Angella Issajenko (CAN)	22.91	Kathy Cook (ENG)	23.18	Sandra Whittaker (SCO)	23.46
400 metres	Debbie Flintoff (AUS)	51.29	Jillian Richardson (CAN)	51.62	Kathy Cook (ENG)	51.88
800 metres	Kirsty Wade (WAL)	2:00.94	Diane Edwards (ENG)	2:01.12	Lorraine Baker (ENG)	2:01.79
1500 metres	Kirsty Wade (WAL)	4:10.91	Debbie Bowker (CAN)	4:11.94	Lynn Williams (CAN)	4:12.66
3000 metres	Lynn Williams (CAN)	8:54.29	Debbie Bowker (CAN)	8:54.83	Yvonne Murray (SCO)	8:55.32
10,000 metres	Liz Lynch (SCO)	31:41.42	Anne Audain (NZL)	31:53.31	Angela Tooby (WAL)	32:25.38
Marathon	Lisa Martin (AUS)	2:26:07	Lorraine Moller (NZL)	2:28:17	Odette Lapierre (CAN)	2:31:48
100 metres hurdles	Sally Gunnell (ENG)	13.29	Wendy Jeal (ENG)	13.41	Glynis Nunn (AUS)	13.44
400 metres hurdles	Debbie Flintoff (AUS)	54.94	Donalda Duprey (CAN)	56.55	Jenny Laurendet (AUS)	56.57
4 × 100 metres relay	England; Paula Dunn; Kathy Cook; Joan Baptiste; Heather Oakes	43.39	Canada; Angela Bailey; Esmie Lawrence; Angela Phipps; Angella Issajenko	43.83	Wales; Helen Miles; Sian Morris; Sallyanne Short; Carmen Smart	45.37
4 × 400 metres relay	Canada; Charmaine Crooks; Marita Payne; Molly Killingbeck; Jillian Richardson	3:28.92	England; Jane Parry; Linda Keough; Angela Piggford; Kathy Cook	3:32.82	Australia; Maree Chapman; Sharon Stewart; Julie Schwass; Debbie Flintoff	3:32.86
High jump	Christine Stanton (AUS)	1.92 m	Sharon McPeake (NIR)	1.90 m	Janet Boyle (NIR)	1.90 m
Long jump	Joyce Oladapo (ENG)	6.43 m	Mary Berkeley (ENG)	6.40 m	Robyn Lorraway (AUS)	6.35 m
Shot put	Gael Martin (AUS)	19.00 m	Judy Oakes (ENG)	18.75 m	Myrtle Augee (ENG)	17.52 m
Discus throw	Gael Martin (AUS)	56.42 m	Venissa Head (WAL)	56.20 m	Karen Pugh (ENG)	54.72 m
Javelin throw	Tessa Sanderson (ENG)	69.80 m GR	Fatima Whitbread (ENG)	68.54 m	Sue Howland (AUS)	64.74 m
Heptathlon	Judy Simpson (ENG)	6282 pts	Jane Flemming (AUS)	6278 pts	Kim Hagger (ENG)	5823 pts

== Medal table ==
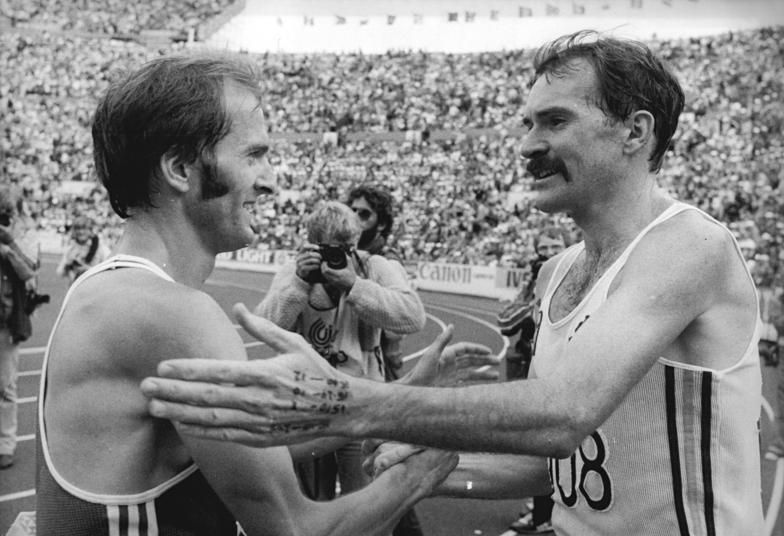
Robert de Castella (right) won the marathon title for Australia.

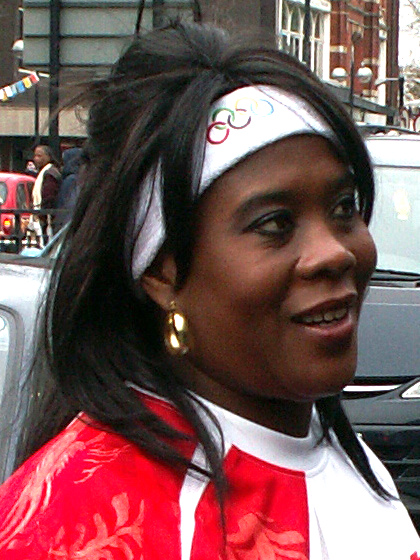
Tessa Sanderson set a Games record for the javelin gold medal.

* Host nation (Scotland)

Rank	Nation	Gold	Silver	Bronze	Total
1	England	18	18	12	48
2	Canada	10	9	9	28
3	Australia	9	5	12	26
4	Wales	2	3	3	8
5	Scotland*	1	2	3	6
6	Northern Ireland	1	2	1	4
7	New Zealand	0	2	2	4
Totals (7 entries)		41	41	42	124

== Participation ==
- Australia (60)
- Botswana (8)
- Canada (79)
- Cook Islands (1)
- England (109)
- Fiji (6)
- Gibraltar (3)
- Hong Kong (1)
- Guernsey (4)
- Isle of Man (5)
- Jersey (2)
- Lesotho (5)
- Malawi (3)
- New Zealand (25)
- Northern Ireland (17)
- Scotland (56)
- Swaziland (3)
- Vanuatu (4)
- Wales (26)
