= Scotland at the 1986 Commonwealth Games =

- CG code: SCO
- CGA: Commonwealth Games Scotland

in Edinburgh, Scotland
- Flag bearers: Opening: Closing: Albert Patrick
- Medals Ranked 6th: Gold 3 Silver 12 Bronze 18 Total 33

Commonwealth Games appearances (overview)
- 1930; 1934; 1938; 1950; 1954; 1958; 1962; 1966; 1970; 1974; 1978; 1982; 1986; 1990; 1994; 1998; 2002; 2006; 2010; 2014; 2018; 2022; 2026; 2030

Scotland competed in the 1986 Commonwealth Games as the host nation in Edinburgh from 24 July to 2 August, the second time the games were held in Edinburgh.

The Scottish team covered 12 sports.

Scotland finished sixth in the medals table with 3 gold, 12 silver and 18 bronze medals.

== Medallists ==
Medal	Name	Sport	Event
Gold	Liz Lynch	Athletics	Women's 10,000 metres
Gold	Billy Gilliland; Dan Travers	Badminton	Men's doubles
Gold	Grant Knox; George Adrain	Lawn bowls	Men's pairs
Silver	Tom McKean	Athletics	Men's 800 metres
Silver	Geoff Parsons	Athletics	Men's high jump
Silver	James McAllister	Boxing	Welterweight (– 67 kg)
Silver	Harry Lawson	Boxing	Light Heavyweight (– 81 kg)
Silver	Doug Young	Boxing	Heavyweight (– 91 kg)
Silver	Senga McCrone	Lawn bowls	Women's singles
Silver	Alister Allan	Shooting	Rifle Prone
Silver	Alister Allan	Shooting	Rifle Three Positions
Silver	Jean Hill	Swimming	Women's 100m breaststroke
Silver	Jean Hill	Swimming	Women's 200m medley
Silver	Charlie Revolta	Weightlifting	Flyweight
Silver	Albert Patrick	Wrestling	Super heavyweight
Bronze	Sandra Whittaker	Athletics	Women's 200 metres
Bronze	Yvonne Murray	Athletics	Women's 3000 metres
Bronze	Jamie Henderson; Cameron Sharp; George McCallum; Elliot Bunney	Athletics	Men's 4 × 100 metres relay
Bronze	Billy Gilliland; Christine Heatly	Badminton	Mixed doubles
Bronze	Wilson Docherty	Boxing	Light Flyweight (– 48 kg)
Bronze	Glen Brooks	Boxing	Bantamweight (– 54 kg)
Bronze	Alec Mullen	Boxing	Light Middleweight (– 71 kg)
Bronze	George Ferrie	Boxing	Middleweight (– 75 kg)
Bronze	Eddie Alexander	Cycling	Men's sprint
Bronze	Richard Corsie	Lawn bowls	Men's singles
Bronze	Ewan Pearson; David Riches	Rowing	Men's coxless pair
Bronze	John Knowles	Shooting	Rifle Prone
Bronze	Alister Allan; Bill MacNeil	Shooting	Rifle Three Positions – Pairs
Bronze	Ruth Gilfillan	Swimming	Women's 200m freestyle
Bronze	Neil Cochrane	Swimming	Men's 200m individual medley
Bronze	Alan Ogilvie	Weightlifting	Flyweight
Bronze	David Connelly	Wrestling	Light flyweight
Bronze	Graeme English	Wrestling	Light heavyweight

Medals by sport
Sport	Gold medal	Silver medal	Bronze medal	Total
Athletics	1	2	3	6
Lawn Bowls	1	1	1	3
Badminton	1	0	1	2
Boxing	0	3	4	7
Shooting	0	2	2	4
Swimming	0	2	2	4
Wrestling	0	1	2	3
Weightlifting	0	1	1	2
Cycling	0	0	1	1
Rowing	0	0	1	1
Total	3	12	18	33

Medals by gender
Gender	Gold medal	Silver medal	Bronze medal	Total
Male	2	7	12	21
Female	1	3	3	7
Mixed / open	0	2	3	5
Total	3	12	18	33

== Aquatics ==
The aquatics events were held at the Royal Commonwealth Pool.

=== Diving ===
Men

Athlete	Event	Final	
Athlete	Event	Points	Rank
Peter Smith	Springboard	443.37	14
Stephen Forrest	Springboard	400.86	15

Women

Athlete	Event	Final	
Athlete	Event	Points	Rank
Jane Ogden	Highboard	321.48	10

=== Swimming ===
Men

Athlete	Event	Heat		Final	
Athlete	Event	Time	Rank	Time	Rank
Graeme Wilson	100 metre freestyle	53.15	4	did not advance	
Duncan Cruikshank	100 metre freestyle	55.67	5	did not advance	
Colin Bole	100 metre freestyle	52.30	3	did not advance	
Neil Cochran	200 metre freestyle	1.52.69	1 Q	1.52.49	5
Graeme Wilson	200 metre freestyle	1.55.74	3	did not advance	
Craig Nelson	400 metre freestlye	4.09.46	6	did not advance	
Campbell McNeil	400 metre freestlye	4.10.30	5	did not advance	
Duncan Cruikshank	400 metre freestlye	4.03.35	4	did not advance	
Campbell McNeil	1500 metre freestyle	16.29.27	7	did not advance	
David Cruikshank	1500 metre freestyle	15.54.24	4 Q	15.44.73	7
Neil Cochran	100 metre backstroke	58.76	2 Q	58.82	8
Craig Nelson	100 metre backstroke	1.01.09	6	did not advance	
Neil Cochran	200 metre backstroke	2.05.94	3 Q	2.06.52	7
Craig Nelson	200 metre backstroke	2.10.53	5	did not advance	
Gary Watson	100 metre breaststroke	1.05.13	1 Q	1.05.20	5
Iain Campbell	100 metre breaststroke	1.05.14	3 Q	1.05.30	6
Iain Campbell	200 metre breaststroke	2.21.62	2 Q	2.21.31	6
Neil Hudghton	200 metre breaststroke	2.23.39	3	did not advance	
Gary Watson	200 metre breaststroke	2.26.94	5	did not advance	
Richard Leishman	100 metre butterfly	57.28	3	did not advance	
William McGoldrick	100 metre butterfly	57.86	4	did not advance	
Andrew J Smith	200 metre butterfly	2.09.52	5	did not advance	
Richard Leishman	200 metre butterfly	2.06.29	4	did not advance	
William McGoldrick	200 metre butterfly	2.06.98	5	did not advance	
Neil Cochran	200 metre individual medley	2.05.16	1 Q	2.04.34	(bronze)
Robin Brew	200 metre individual medley	2.08.76	2	did not advance	
Campbell McNeil	400 metre Individual Medley	4.51.12	6	did not advance	
Andrew J Smith	400 metre Individual Medley	4.39.70	6	did not advance	
Colin Bole; Graeme Watson; Paul Brew; Neil Cochran	4x100 metre freestyle relay	—N/a		3.29.79	4
Graeme Wilson; Paul Brew; Colin Bole; Neil Cochran	4x200 metre freestyle relay	—N/a		7.36.31	4
Craig Nelson; Gary Watson; Richard Leishman; Colin Bole	4x100 metre medlay relay	4.02.86	3 Q	3.54.05	5

Women

Athlete	Event	Heat		Final	
Athlete	Event	Time	Rank	Time	Rank
Linda Donnelly	100 metre freestyle	59.17	2	did not advance	
Stephanie Watson	100 metre freestyle	59.70	4	did not advance	
Ruth Gilfillan	100 metre freestyle	59.27	3	did not advance	
Ruth Gilfillan	200 metre freestyle	—N/a		2.03.88.4	(bronze)
Linda Donnelly	400 metre freestyle	4.25.19	6	did not advance	
Ruth Gilfillan	400 metre freestyle	4.19.34	3 Q	4.17.25	5
Elaine Gilfillan	400 metre freestyle	4.31.27	7	did not advance	
Ruth Gilfillan	800 metre freestyle	8.57.99	4	did not advance	
Shona Cowie	800 metre freestyle	9.16.52	5	did not advance	
Anna Ratcliff	100 metre backstroke	1.08.66	5	did not advance	
Beverley Rose	100 metre backstroke	1.05.71	3 Q	1.05.63	8
Jill Ewing	100 metre backstroke	1.06.25	4	did not advance	
Beverley Rose	200 metre backstroke	2.22.60	4	did not advance	
Jill Ewing	200 metre backstroke	2.23.61	5	did not advance	
Anna Ratcliff	200 metre backstroke	2.24.51	5	did not advance	
Jean Hill	100 metre breaststroke	1.11.90	2 Q	1.11.38	(silver)
Shona Smart	100 metre breaststroke	1.15.81	4	did not advance	
Sandra MacDonald	100 metre breaststroke	1.16.70	6	did not advance	
Jean Hill	200 metre breaststroke	2.36.31	2 Q	2.35.00	4
Shona Smart	200 metre breaststroke	2.43.36	4	did not advance	
Sandra MacDonald	100 metre butterfly	1.05.26	4	did not advance	
Shona Smart	100 metre butterfly	1.05.05	4	did not advance	
Lorraine Montford	200 metre butterfly	2.20.35	3 Q	2.19.63	8
Shona Smart	200 metre butterfly	2.21.19	3	did not advance	
Anna Ratcliff	200 metre individual medley	2.28.69	6	did not advance	
Jean Hill	200 metre individual medley	2.18.78	1 Q	2.17.21	(silver)
Shona Smart	200 metre individual medley	2.21.97	4 Q	2.21.71	7
Jean Hill	400 metre individual medley	4.56.19	3 Q	4.54.11	5
Shona Smart	400 metre individual medley	5.03.28	6	did not advance	
Ruth Gilfillan; Elaine Gilfillan; Stephanie Watson; Linda Donnelly	4x100 metre freestyle relay	—N/a		3.55.89	4
Ruth Gilfillan; Elaine Gilfillan; Shona Smart; Linda Donnelly	4x200 metre freestyle relay	—N/a		8.26.58	4
Beverley Rose; Jean Hill; Shona Smart; Linda Donnelly	4×100 metre medley relay	—N/a		4.17.89	4

=== Synchronised swimming ===
Athlete	Event	Final	
Athlete	Event	Time	Rank
Kim McIntosh	Synchronised solo	165.93	5
Kim McIntosh; Morwenna Penrose	Synchronised duet	164.05	4

== Athletics ==
Men
Track and road

Athlete	Event	Heat		Semifinal		Final	
Athlete	Event	Time	Rank	Time	Rank	Time	Rank
Cameron Sharp	100 metres	10.57	3 Q	10.63	6	did not advance	
Jamie Henderson	100 metres	10.29	2 Q	10.59	3 Q	10.68	8
Elliot Bunney	100 metres	10.32	1 Q	10.31	3 Q	10.37	5
George McCallum	200 metres	21.60	5 Q	21.39	5	did not advance	
Brian Whittle	200 metres	21.34	4 Q	21.69	6	did not advance	
Brian Nicoll	400 metres	49.91	5 Q	50.07	6	did not advance	
Martin Johnston	400 metres	48.19	4 Q	48.57	5	did not advance	
Brian Whittle	400 metres	46.69	1 Q	47.56	4 Q	47.10	5
Paul Forbes	800 metres	1:50.07	4 Q	1:48.29	4 Q	1:51.29	7
Tom McKean	800 metres	1:53:31	4 Q	1:49.02	2 Q	1:44.80	(silver)
John Robson	1500 metres	—N/a		3:43.21	6 Q	3:57.20	10
Alistair Currie	1500 metres	—N/a		3:44.82	5	did not advance	
Nat Muir	5000 metres	—N/a				13:40.92	8
Allister Hutton	10,000 metres	—N/a				30:16.50	11
John Wallace	110 metres hurdle	—N/a		10.32	5	did not advance	
Glenn MacDonald	110 metres hurdle	—N/a		14.37	5	did not advance	
Mark Hardie	400 metres hurdles	55.68	5	did not advance			
Mark Fulton	400 metres hurdles	57.90	6	did not advance			
Dave McCutcheon	400 metres hurdles	53.58	6	did not advance			
Tom Hanlon	3000 metres steeplechase	—N/a				8:53.56	10
Colin Hume	3000 metres steeplechase	—N/a				9:05.40	11
Richard Charleston	3000 metres steeplechase	—N/a				9:21.73	12
Jamie Henderson; Cameron Sharp; George McCallum; Elliot Bunney	4 × 100 metres relay	—N/a				40.41	(bronze)
Martin Johnston; Tom McKean; Paul Forbes; Brian Whittle	4 × 400 metres relay	—N/a				3:18.03	4
John Graham	Marathon	—N/a				2:12.10	4
Fraser Clyne	Marathon	—N/a				2:17.30	10

Field

Athlete	Event	Final	
Athlete	Event	Distance	Rank
Geoff Parsons	High jump	2.28	(silver)
Bradley McStravick	Pole vault	4.45	8
Ken McKay	Long jump	7.39	8
Craig Duncan	Triple jump	15.68	7
Eric Irvine	Shot put	16.73	9
George Patience	Discus throw	52.54	8
Chris Black	Hammer throw	63.88	8

Combined events – Decathlon

Athlete	Event	100 m	LJ	SP	HJ	400 m	110H	DT	PV	JT	1500 m	Final	Rank
Brad McStravick	Result	10.83	6.73	13.47	1.93	49.52	15.15	40.52	4.40	56.06	4:33.05	7563	4
Brad McStravick	Points	899	750	696	740	837	831	675	731	679	725	7563	4

Women
Track and road

Athlete	Event	Semifinal		Final	
Athlete	Event	Time	Rank	Time	Rank
Kaye Jeffrey	100 metres	11.55	4 Q	11.59	6
Sandra Whittaker	100 metres	11.60	3 Q	11.59	5
Angela Bridgeman	200 metres	24.13	6	did not advance	
Sandra Whittaker	200 metres	23.41	2 Q	23.46	(bronze)
Fiona Hargreaves	400 metres	55.76	6	did not advance	
Dawn Kitchen	400 metres	55.52	6	did not advance	
Anne Purvis	800 metres	2:02.47	1 Q	2:02.17	4
Elizabeth MacArthur	800 metres	2:04.40	4	did not advance	
Christine Whittingham	1500 metres	4:28.04	6	did not advance	
Yvonne Murray	1500 metres	4:11.82	1 Q	4:14.36	5
Lynne MacDougall	1500 metres	4:13.07	3 Q	4:17.25	8
Yvonne Murray	3000 metres	—N/a		8:55.32	(bronze)
Marsela Robertson	3000 metres	—N/a		9:51.33	9
Liz Lynch	10,000 metres	—N/a		31:41.42	(gold)
Andrea Everett	10,000 metres	—N/a		33:56.43	9
Christine Price	10,000 metres	—N/a		33:59.90	10
Pat Rollo	100 metres hurdles	14	7	did not advance	
Ann Girvan	100 metres hurdles	13.60	6	did not advance	
Moira McBeath	400 metres hurdles	1.04.03	6	did not advance	
Ann Girvan; Kaye Jeffrey; Angela Bridgeman; Sandra Whittaker	4 × 100 metres relay	—N/a		45.84	4
Sandra Whittaker; Anne Purvis; Dawn Kitchen; Fiona Hargreaves	4 × 400 metres relay	—N/a		3:42.86	4
Lorna Irving	Marathon	—N/a		2:36.34	5

Field

Athlete	Event	Final	
Athlete	Event	Distance	Rank
Jayne Barnetson	High jump	1.83	7
Lorraine Campbell	Long jump	5.65	12

Combined events – Heptathlon

Athlete	Event	100H	HJ	SP	200 m	LJ	JT	800 m	Final	Rank
Valerie Walsh	Result	14.26	1.76	11.11	25.59	5.51	36.82	—N/a	5420	8
Valerie Walsh	Points	942	928	602	833	703	606	—N/a	5420	8

== Badminton ==
Athlete	Event	Round of 16	Quarterfinals	Semifinals	Final/ Bronze Medal Match	Rank
Athlete	Event	Opposition Score	Opposition Score	Opposition Score	Opposition Score	Rank
Alex White	Men's singles	Yeung Yik Kei (HKG); W (15-6, 15-2)	Mike Butler (CAN); W (15-2, 15-6)	Steve Baddeley (ENG); L (15-10, 14-4)	Nick Yates (ENG); L (15-9, 15-10)	4
Ken Middlemiss	Men's singles	John Goss (CAN); W (15-5, 15-9)	Sze Yu (AUS); L (15-4, 15-0)	did not advance		
Elinor Allen	Women's singles	Denyse Julien (CAN); L (11-3, 11-5)	did not advance			
Billy Gilliland; Dan Travers	Men's doubles	Phil Horne; Graeme Robson (NZL); W (15-2, 11-15, 18-14)	Mike Butler; Ken Poole (CAN); W (15-3, 15-3)	Michael Scandolera; Paul Kong (AUS); W (15-9, 9-15, 15-2)	Andy Goode; Nigel Tier (ENG); W (15-8, 15-8)	(gold)
Alex White; Iain Pringle	Men's doubles	Andy Goode; Nigel Tier (ENG); L (10-15, 15-6, 17-16)	did not advance			
Elinor Allen; Jenny Allen	Women's doubles	Gillian Clark; Gillian Gowers (ENG); L (15-2, 15-9)	did not advance			
Christine Heatly; Aileen Nairn	Women's doubles	Johanne Falardeau; Denyse Julien (CAN); L (15-3, 15-8)	did not advance			
Ken Middlemiss; Aileen Nairn	Mixed doubles	Ken Poole; Linda Cloutier (CAN); L (15-9, 15-10)	did not advance			
Dan Travers; Elinor Allen	Mixed doubles	Michael Scandolera; Audrey Tuckey (AUS); L (15-5, 15-0)	did not advance			
Iain Pringle; Jenny Allen	Mixed doubles	Paul Martin; Sharron Baird (IOM); W (15-1, 15-1)	Andy Goode; Fiona Elliott (ENG); L (15-0, 15-0)	did not advance		
Billy Gilliland; Christine Heatly	Mixed doubles	Darren McDonald; Julie McDonald (AUS); W (17-14, 15-9)	Glenn Stewart; Karen Phillips (NZL); W (15-5, 15-3)	Andy Goode; Fiona Elliott (ENG); L (15-14, 18-15)	Ken Poole; Linda Cloutier (CAN); W (15-12, 17-14)	(bronze)
Scotland (+ Alison Fulton)	Mixed team	—N/a	Hong Kong W 5-0; Guernsey W 5-0; Canada L 3-2	England; L 4-1	Australia; L 3-2	4

== Boxing ==
Men

Athlete	Event	Quarterfinals	Semifinals	Finals	
Athlete	Event	Opposition Result	Opposition Result	Opposition Result	Rank
Wilson Docherty	Light flyweight (48kg)	—N/a	Mark Epton (ENG) L	did not advance	(bronze)
Drew Docherty	Flyweight (51kg)	Steve Beaupré (CAN) L	did not advance		
Glen Brooks	Bantamweight (54kg)	Sean Ward (WAL) W	Sean Murphy (ENG) L	did not advance	(bronze)
Charlie Kane	Featherweight (57kg)	Chris Carleton (NIR) L	did not advance		
Jim Pender	Light welterweight (63.5kg)	Howard Grant (CAN) L	did not advance		
James McAllister	Welterweight (67kg)	Sterling Ebanks (CAY) W	John Shaw (CAN) W	Darren Dyer (ENG) L	(silver)
Alec Mullen	Light middleweight (71kg)	Se'ese Fidow (SAM) W	Rick Finch (AUS) L	did not advance	(bronze)
George Ferrie	Middleweight (75kg)	James Iauhuat (VAN) W	Rod Douglas (ENG) L	did not advance	(bronze)
Harry Lawson	Light heavyweight (81kg)	Noel Thomas (CAY) W	Byron Pullen (WAL) W	Jim Moran (ENG) L	(silver)
Doug Young	Heavyweight (91kg)	Kevin McCormack (WAL) W	Eric Cardouza (ENG) W	Jimmy Peau (NZL) L	(silver)

== Cycling ==
Men

Athlete	Event	Heat		Quartfinal		Semifinal		Final/Bronze Medal Match	
Athlete	Event	Time/ Score	Rank	Time/ Score	Result	Time/ Score	Result	Time/ Score	Rank
Eddie Alexander	Time trial	—N/a						1.08.13	8
Stewart Brydon	Time trial	—N/a						1.10.16	15
Alistair Adams	Time trial	—N/a						1.10.66	16
Eddie Alexander	Sprint	Q		2-0	W	2-1	L	2-0	(bronze)
Stewart Brydon	Sprint	R		2-0	L	did not advance			
Ken Clark	Individual pursuit	5:08:37	13	did not advance					
Alistair Adams	Individual pursuit	5:19:85	15	did not advance					
Ken Clark	10 miles scratch	—N/a						-	8
Alistair Adams	10 miles scratch	—N/a						-	unplaced
Eddie Alexander	10 miles scratch	—N/a						-	unplaced
Ken Clark; David Hannah; Malcolm Little; Bob Melrose	Road team time trial	—N/a						2.22.49	7
Andrew Wilson	Road race	—N/a						4:11.79	8
Brian Smith	Road race	—N/a						4:13.68	14
Bob Melrose	Road race	—N/a						4:14.06	23
Michaal Lawson	Road race	—N/a						4:36.95	29

== Judo ==
Demonstration event only

Men

Athlete	Events	Medals
Willie Bell	65kg half-lightweight	Bronze medal
Willie Buchanon	65kg half-lightweight	
Graham Campbell	95kg half-heavyweight	Bronze medal
Tom Cullen	71kg lightweight	
Billy Cusack	71kg lightweight	
John McNeil	86kg middleweight	
Martin McSorley	78kg half-middleweight	Silver medal
David Patterson	+95kg heavyweight	
Mark Preston	60kg extra-lightweight	

Women

Athlete	Events	Medals
Eileen Boyle	66kg middleweight	Gold medal
Jacqueline Cairns	52kg lightweight	
Rhonda Craig	61kg half-middleweight	
Loretta Doyle	52kg half-lightweight	Silver medal
Pauline McCormick	+72kg heavyweight	
Lorna McNeil	72kg half-heavyweight	Bronze medal
Anne Marie Mulholland	48kg extra-lightweight	Silver medal
Claire Shiach	52kg half-lightweight	Bronze medal

== Lawn bowls ==
The lawn bowls were held at Balgreen. Men

Athlete	Events	Club
George Adrain	pairs	Armadale BC
Jim Boyle	fours	Whitburn BC
Richard Corsie	singles	Craigentinny BC
Willie Harkness	fours	Glengowan BC
Grant Knox	pairs	Armadale BC
John Watson	fours	Tranent BC
Malcolm Graham	fours	Linlithgow BC

Women

Athlete	Events	Club
Greta Boyle	pairs	Ardeer Recreation BC
Annette Evans	fours	Willowbank BC, Glasgow
Sarah Gourlay	fours	Annbank BC
Senga McCrone	singles	Buccleuch BC, Hawick
Janet Menzies	fours	Douglas Victoria BC
Nan Mulholland	pairs	Glengarnock BC
Frances Whyte	fours	Priorscroft BC, Paisley

Men

Athlete	Event	Round Robin												Rank
Athlete	Event	Score	Score	Score	Score	Score	Score	Score	Score	Score	Score	Score	Score	Rank
Richard Corsie	Singles	Fong (FIJ); W 21 - 18	Smith (GGY); W 21 - 17	Thomson (ENG); W 21 - 12	Wallace (CAN); L 21 - 19	Schuback (AUS); L 21 - 13	David (BOT); W 21 - 7	Young (MAW); W 21 - 10	Hill (WAL); W 21 - 14	Bosley (HKG); W 21 - 7	Espie (NIR); W 21 - 19	Dickison (NZL); L 21 - 12	Le Marquand (JEY); W 21 - 8	(bronze)
Grant Knox; George Adrain	Pairs	Fiji; W 30 - 13	England; W 22 - 12	Canada; W 24 - 17	Botswana; W 28 - 14	Jersey; W 21 - 11	Wales; W 20 - 18	Hong Kong; W 21 - 13	Guernsey; W 25 - 12	Malawi; W 22 - 11	Northern Ireland; W 26 - 14	New Zealand; W 17 - 13	Australia; W 27 - 14	(gold)
Graham Robertson; Jim Boyle; Malcolm Graham; Willie Harkness	Fours	Guernsey; W 26 - 11	Fiji; W 19 - 15	England; W 23 - 15	Canada; L 30 - 14	Botswana; W 26 - 18	Australia; L 22 - 15	Wales; L 22 - 13	Swaziland; W 24 - 19	Hong Kong; W 22 - 15	Northern Ireland; L 31 - 15	New Zealand; L 25 - 17	—N/a	6

Women

Athlete	Event	Round Robin												Rank
Athlete	Event	Score	Score	Score	Score	Score	Score	Score	Score	Score	Score	Score	Score	Rank
Senga McCrone	Singles	le Tissier (GGY); W 21 - 1	Line (ENG); L 21 - 8	Hunter (CAN); W 21 - 20	Ryan (NZL); W 21 - 18	Anderson (BOT); W 21-7	Fahey (AUS); W 21 - 20	Blattman (JER); W 21 - 6	Dainton (WAL); W 21 - 19	Humphreys (HKG); L 21 - 11	Bell (NIR); W 21 - 8	Lum On (FIJ); W	—N/a	(silver)
Nan Mulholland; Greta Boyle	Pairs	Fiji; W 18 - 14	England; W 25 - 10	Canada; L 17 - 13	Botswana; L 18 - 17	Australia; L 19 - 17	Wales; L 23 - 17	Hong Kong; L 24 - 15	Northern Ireland; W 20 - 15	New Zealand; W 22 - 20	Guernsey; L	—N/a		8
Annette Evans; Frances Whyte; Jen Menzies; Sarah Gourlay	Fours	Malawi; D 19 - 19	England; L 19 - 18	Swaziland; L 23 - 18	Canada; W 21 - 16	New Zealand; W 22 - 18	Fiji; W 25 - 18	Australia; W 18 - 14	Wales; W 26 - 16	Botswana; L 21 - 12	Guernsey; L 21 - 19	Hong Kong; W 24 - 19	Northern Ireland; W 24 - 14	7

== Rowing ==
Men

Athlete	Event	Heat		Repechage		Final	
Athlete	Event	Time	Rank	Time	Rank	Time	Rank
Phillip Kittermaster	Single sculls	7:40.34	2	7:28.52	2 Q	7:45.67	4
Ian Wilson; Russell Lucas	Double sculls	7:40.56	3	7:00.36	5	did not advance	
Ewan Pearson; David Riches	Coxless pairs	7:01.54	1 Q	—N/a		6:43.06	(bronze)
Martin Holmes; Douglas McFarlane; William Brown; Quintin McKellar	Coxless fours	7:01.54	3	3 Q		6:21.26	5
John Bowie; David Nolan; Charles Ivatt; David Ivatt	Coxed fours	7:25.62	2	6:50.91	3 Q	6:38.14	5
Charles Ivatt; John Bowie; Archie McConnell; Doug McFarlane; Martin Holmes; Quintin McKellar; William Brown; David Ivatt; Joe Kelly	Eights	—N/a				5:54.50	5
Jim Sloan	Lightweight single sculls	7:41.7	3	7:37:34	5	did not advance	
Tom Baxter; Duncan Warwick; Auster McNaughton; David Nolan	Lightweight coxless fours	—N/a				6:52.48	6

Women

Athlete	Event	Final	
Athlete	Event	Time	Rank
Fiona Nowak; Amanda Towrie	Double sculls	7:56.03	4
Fiona Freckleton; Morag Simpson	Coxless pairs	8:10.47	4
Karen Barton; Eleanor McNish; Christine Brown; Patricia McKellar	Coxed fours	7:31.54	6
Carol-Ann Wood	Lightweight single sculls	8:06.46	5
Karen Barton; Eleanor McNish; Christine Brown; Patricia McKellar	Lightweight coxless four	7:18.31	5

== Shooting ==
Open events
Pistol

Athlete	Event	Final	
Athlete	Event	Points	Rank
Ian Lang	Free Pistol	536	10
Robin MacDonald	Free Pistol	521	13
Robin MacDonald; Ian Lang	Free Pistol – Pairs	1023	6
Stuart Rankine	Centre-Fire Pistol	575	7
Jim Tollan	Centre-Fire Pistol	575	8
Stuart Rankine; Jim Tollan	Centre-Fire Pistol – Pairs	1139	4
Hugh Love	Rapid-Fire Pistol	578	8
Hugh Hunter	Rapid-Fire Pistol	577	9
Hugh Love; Hugh Hunter	Rapid-Fire Pistol – Pairs	1144	6
Ian Lang	Air Pistol	562	9
Stuart Rankine	Air Pistol	562	10
Ian Lang; Stuart Rankine	Air Pistol – Pairs	1116	6

Rifle

Athlete	Event	Final	
Athlete	Event	Points	Rank
Alister Allan	Rifle Prone	598	(silver)
John Knowles	Rifle Prone	597	(bronze)
Alister Allan; John Knowles	Rifle Prone – Pairs	1155	6
Alister Allan	Rifle Three Positions	1167	(silver)
Bill Macneil	Rifle Three Positions	1120	11
Alister Allan; Bill Macneil	Rifle Three Positions – Pairs	2241	(bronze)
Richard Simpson	Full Bore Rifle	394	5
Arthur Clarke	Full Bore Rifle	391	8
Arthur Clarke; Richard Simpson	Full Bore Rifle – Pairs	5817	6
Bill Macneil	Air Rifle	577	6
Alister Allan	Air Rifle	569	11
Alister Allan; Bill Macneil	Air Rifle – Pairs	1137	4

Shotgun

Athlete	Event	Final	
Athlete	Event	Points	Rank
Martin Girvan	Trap	189	5
Sandy Dunbar	Trap	180	14
Martin Girvan; Sandy Dunbar	Trap – Pairs	180	5
Ian Marsden	Skeet	193	6
Jim Dunlop	Skeet	192	7
Ian Marsden; Jim Dunlop	Skeet – Pairs	184	8

== Weightlifting ==
Five competitors withdrew from the flyweight event due to the 1986 Commonwealth Games boycott resulting in the category only having three competitors. According to games rules this meant that only the gold medal was awarded. A Games Federation meeting two days later overturned this decision and the silver medal was awarded to Charlie Revolta and the bronze to Alan Ogilvie.

Athlete	Event	Weight Lifted		Total	Rank
Athlete	Event	Snatch	Clean & jerk	Total	Rank
Charlie Revolta	Flyweight	82.5	102.5	185	(silver)
Alan Ogilvie	Flyweight	75	102.5	177.5	(bronze)
John McNiven	56kg	85	110	195	4
Norman Cummingham	67.5kg	102.5	125	227.5	4
Graham Cummingham	67.5kg	90	105	195	5
Jim Strachan	75kg	105	130	235	4
John McNiven Jun	75kg	100	130	230	5
Charles Murray	90kg	120	165	265	5

== Wrestling ==
Men

Athlete	Event	Group rounds		Finals	
Athlete	Event	Opposition Result	Opposition Result	Opposition Result	Rank
David Connelly	Light flyweight (48kg)	Duncan Burns (ENG) L	Ron Moncur (CAN) L	—N/a	(bronze)
Paul Nedley	Bantamweight (57kg)	Paul Farrugia (MLT) W	Steven Reinsfield (NZL) L	Brian Aspen (ENG) L	4
Brian Miller	Featherweight (62kg)	Gavin Beswick (ENG) L	Dan Cumming (CAN) L	Mark Bowman (NIR) W	5
Chris McKay	Lightweight (68kg)	—N/a	Zsigi Kelevitz (AUS) L	Steve Cooper (ENG)	4
Calum McNeill	Welterweight (74kg)	Geoff Marsh (AUS) L	Zane Coleman (NZL) L	Fitzlloyd Walker (ENG) L	4
Paul Beattie	Middleweight (82kg)	Wally Koenig (AUS) L	did not advance		
Graeme English	Light heavyweight (90kg)	—N/a	Doug Cox (CAN) L	Alan Thompson (AUS) W	(bronze)
Willie Robertson	Heavyweight (100kg)	David Kilpin (ENG) L	Robert Algie (NZL) L	Ivan Weir (NIR) W	5
Albert Patrick	Super heavyweight (130kg)	—N/a	Dru Schaffer (AUS) W	Wayne Brightwell (CAN) L	(silver)
