= Scotland at the 1990 Commonwealth Games =

- CGF code: SCO
- CGA: Commonwealth Games Scotland
- Website: www.teamscotland.scot

in Auckland, New Zealand
- Flag bearer: Opening: Richard Corsie
- Medals Ranked 9th: Gold 5 Silver 7 Bronze 10 Total 22

Commonwealth Games appearances (overview)
- 1930; 1934; 1938; 1950; 1954; 1958; 1962; 1966; 1970; 1974; 1978; 1982; 1986; 1990; 1994; 1998; 2002; 2006; 2010; 2014; 2018; 2022; 2026; 2030

Scotland competed at the 1990 Commonwealth Games in Auckland, New Zealand, from 27 January to 3 February 1990. The nation was represented by the Commonwealth Games Council for Scotland (CGCE) and joined the Commonwealth of Nations as part of the United Kingdom in 1931.

Scotland came 9th overall with 5 gold, 7 silver and 10 bronze medals.

== Medallists ==
=== Gold ===
- Loretta Cusack (judo)
- Charlie Kane (boxing)
- Liz McColgan (Women's 10,000 metres).
- Men's fours (lawn bowls)
- Men's skeet pairs (shooting)

=== Silver ===
- Yvonne Murray (3000m)
- Alan Ogilvie (weightlifting snatch)
- Alan Ogilvie (weightlifting overall)
- Mark Preston (judo)
- Claire Shiach (judo)
- Winston Sweatman (judo)
- Men's 4 × 100 m relay (athletics)

=== Bronze ===
- David Anderson (boxing)
- Richard Corsie (lawn bowls)
- Graham Campbell (judo)
- Graham Campbell (judo, open)
- Billy Cusack (judo)
- Liz McColgan (3,000 metres)
- Alan Ogilvie (weightlifting C&j)
- Geoff Parsons (high jump)
- Donna Robertson (judo)
- Men's smallbore rifle, Three Positions pair (shooting)

== Team ==
=== Athletics ===
Men

| Athlete | Events | Club | Medals |
|---|---|---|---|
| Elliot Bunney | 100, 4x100 relay | | |
| David James Clark | 100, 200, 4x100 relay | | |
| Mark Davidson | 400m hurdles, 4x100, 4x400 relay | | Silver medal |
| Craig Bruce Duncan | triple jump | | |
| Tom Hanlon | steeplechase | | |
| Jamie Henderson | 100, 200, 4x100 relay | | |
| Duncan Mathieson | decathlon, 4x400 relay | | Silver medal |
| Tom McKean | 800m, 4x400 relay | | Silver medal |
| Darrin Lee Morris | discus throw | | |
| Geoff Parsons | high jump | | Bronze medal |
| Stephen Ritchie | high jump | | |
| David Strang | 800m, 4x400 relay | | Silver medal |
| Brian Whittle | 400, 4x400 relay | | Silver medal |
| Stephen Anthony Whyte | hammer throw, shot put | | |

Women

| Athlete | Events | Club | Medals |
|---|---|---|---|
| Sheila Catford | marathon | | |
| Nicola Emblem | javelin, shot put | | |
| Lynn Harding | marathon | | |
| Karen Hutcheson | 1500m, 3000m | | |
| Lynne MacIntyre | 1500m | | |
| Karen MacLeod | 10,000m | | |
| Liz McColgan | 3,000, 10,000m | | Gold medal Bronze medal |
| Yvonne Murray | 1500, 3000m | | Silver medal |
| Janis Neilson | 100, 200m | | |
| Shona Mary Urquhart | heptathlon, high jump | | |

=== Badminton ===
Men

| Athlete | Events | Club | Medals |
|---|---|---|---|
| Anthony Gallagher | singles, doubles, team | Perth | |
| Kenny Middlemiss | singles, mixed, team | Edinburgh | |
| Kevin Scott | singles, doubles, mixed | Guildford | |
| Dan Travers | doubles, mixed, team | Glasgow | |
| Alex White | singles, doubles, mixed | Kilmarnock | |

Women

| Athlete | Events | Club | Medals |
|---|---|---|---|
| Elinor Allen | doubles, mixed, team | Edinburgh | |
| Jenny Allen | singles, doubles, mixed, team | Edinburgh | |
| Anne Gibson | singles, doubles, team | Dumfries | |
| Gillian Martin | singles, mixed | Brookfield | |
| Aileen Nairn | singles, doubles, mixed | Perth | |

=== Boxing ===
| Athlete | Events | Club | Medals |
|---|---|---|---|
| Dave Anderson | 60 kg lightweight | | Bronze medal |
| Andrew Caulfield | 81 kg light-heavyweight | | |
| Mike Deveney | 57 kg featherweight | | |
| Wilson Docherty | 54 kg bantamweight | Croy Miners Welfare ABC | |
| Charlie Kane | 63.5 kg light-welterweight | | Gold medal |
| John McLean | 51 kg flyweight | | |
| Steven Morrison | 71 kg light-middleweight | | |
| James Pender | 67 kg welterweight | | |
| Paul Weir | -48 kg Light-flyweight | | |
| Stephen Wilson | 75 kg middleweight | | |

=== Cycling ===
| Athlete | Events | Club | Medals |
|---|---|---|---|
| Eddie Alexander | scratch, sprint | | |
| Stewart Brydon | scratch, sprint, points | | |
| Andrew Ferry | road race, team time trial | | |
| Andrew Matheson | road race, team time trial | | |
| Brian Smith | road race, team time trial | | |
| David Smith | road race, team time trial | | |
| Andrew Young | road race | | |

=== Diving ===
Men

| Athlete | Events | Club | Medals |
|---|---|---|---|
| Stephen Forrest | | | |
| Peter Smit | | | |

=== Gymnastics ===
Men

| Athlete | Events | Medals |
|---|---|---|
| Derek Callahan | all-round, team | |
| Steve Frew | all-round, team | |
| Stuart McMahon | all-round, team | |

Women

| Athlete | Events | Medals |
|---|---|---|
| Faith Arnott | all-round, team, floor | |
| Ruth Gibson | all-round, team | |
| Catherine Hughes | rhythmic | |
| Susan Martin | all-round, team | |
| Laura Jevons | rhythmic | |

=== Judo ===
Men

| Athlete | Events | Medals |
|---|---|---|
| Ian Armstrong | 78 kg half-middleweight | |
| Gordon Cameron | 60 kg extra-lightweight | |
| Graham Campbell | 95 kg half-heavyweight, open | , |
| Billy Cusack | 71 kg lightweight | Bronze medal |
| Mark Preston | 65 kg half-lightweight | Silver medal |
| Winston Sweatman | 86 kg middleweight | Silver medal |

Women

| Athlete | Events | Medals |
|---|---|---|
| Doreen Bagnall | 66 kg, middleweight, open | |
| Loretta Cusack | 56 kg lightweight | Gold medal |
| Michele McQuarrie | 56 kg lightweight | |
| Donna Robertson | 48 kg extra-lightweight | Bronze medal |
| Claire Shiach | 52 kg half-lightweight | Silver medal |

=== Lawn bowls ===
Men

| Athlete | Events | Club | Medals |
|---|---|---|---|
| George Adrain | fours | Dreghorn BC | Gold medal |
| Angus Blair | pairs | Haddington BC | |
| Ian Bruce | fours | Kincardine O'Neil BC | Gold medal |
| Richard Corsie | singles | Craigentinny BC | Bronze medal |
| Denis Love | fours | Dumfries BC | Gold medal |
| Graham Robertson | pairs | Tranent BC | |
| Willie Wood | fours | Gifford BC | Gold medal |

Women

| Athlete | Events | Club | Medals |
|---|---|---|---|
| Annette Evans | fours | Willowbank BC, Glasgow | |
| Sarah Gourlay | pairs | Annbank BC | |
| Joyce Lindores | fours | Ettrick Forest BC | |
| Janice Maxwell | fours | Castle Douglas BC | |
| Senga McCrone | singles | Buccleuch BC, Hawick | |
| Ann Watson | fours | Loanhead BC | |
| Frances Whyte | pairs | Priorscroft BC | |

=== Shooting ===
| Athlete | Events | Medals |
|---|---|---|
| Alister Allan | air rifle, air rifle pair, rifle 3positions, prone, pair | |
| Arthur Clarke | fullbore rifle, fullbore rifle pair | |
| Peter Croft | clay pigeon trap, trap pair | |
| Jim Dunlop | skeet, skeet pair | Gold medal |
| John Knowles | prone, prone pair | |
| Robin Law | air rifle, pair, rifle 3positions, pairs | Bronze medal |
| Ian Marsden | skeet, skeet pair | Gold medal |
| Derek McIntosh | air pistol, air pistol pair, free pistol, free pistol pair | |
| Bill Murray | rifle 3position pair | Bronze medal |
| Gary Peacock | clay pigeon trap, trap pair | |
| James Scobie | fullbore rifle, fullbore rifle pair | |
| William Thomson | free pistol, free pistol pair, centre fire, pair | |
| Jim Tollan | air pistol, air pistol pair, centre fire, centre fire pair | |

=== Swimming ===
Men

| Athlete | Events | Club | Medals |
|---|---|---|---|
| Paul Brew | 200, 400 medley, 400 free | | |
| Peter Henry | 200 butterfly, 200, 400 free, 200 medley | | |
| Neil Hudghton | 100, 200m breaststroke | | |
| Jonathan Kerr | 100, 200m backstroke, 200, 400 medley | | |
| Richard Leishman | 100, 200m butterfly | | |
| Campbell McNeil | 100, 200, 1500 freestyle | | |
| Sean McQuaid | 100, 200m Freestyle | | |
| Craig Noble | 1500 free | | |
| Michael Peyrebrune | 100, 200m backstroke | | |
| Gary Watson | 100m breaststroke, 50 free | | |

Women

| Athlete | Events | Club | Medals |
|---|---|---|---|
| Linda Donnelly | 50, 100, 200 free | | |
| Jill Ewing | 100, 200 backstroke | | |
| Ruth Gilfillan | 100, 200, 400 free | | |
| Jean Hill | 100, 200 breaststroke, 200 medley | | |
| Joanne McHarg | 50 free | | |
| Alison Sheppard | 100 backstroke, 50, 200 free | | |

=== Weightlifting ===
| Athlete | Events | Club | Medals |
|---|---|---|---|
| Graham Cunningham | 60 kg | | |
| Norman Cunningham | 67.5 kg | | |
| John McEwan | 82.5 kg | | |
| Alexander McFarlane | 52 kg | | |
| Denis O'Brien | 56 kg bantamweight | | |
| Alan Ogilvie | 56 kg bantamweight | | ,, |
