= Athletics at the 1986 Commonwealth Games – Men's 200 metres =

Men's 200 metres at the Commonwealth Games

The men's 200 metres event at the 1986 Commonwealth Games was held on 28 and 31 July at the Meadowbank Stadium in Edinburgh.

== Medalists ==
Gold	Silver	Bronze
Atlee Mahorn; Canada	Todd Bennett; England	Ben Johnson; Canada

== Results ==
=== Heats ===
Qualification: First 4 of each heat (Q) and the next 4 fastest (q) qualified for the semifinals.

Wind:
Heat 1: +0.9 m/s, Heat 2: +0.3 m/s, Heat 3: +1.6 m/s

Rank	Heat	Name	Nationality	Time	Notes
1	3	Todd Bennett	England	20.83	Q
2	3	Ben Johnson	Canada	20.84	Q
3	2	Atlee Mahorn	Canada	20.98	Q
4	1	John Dinan	Australia	20.99	Q
5	3	Robert Stone	Australia	21.01	Q
6	2	Simon Baird	Northern Ireland	21.04	Q
7	2	John Regis	England	21.26	Q
8	3	Brian Whittle	Scotland	21.34	Q
9	2	Miles Murphy	Australia	21.41	Q
10	2	George McCallum	Scotland	21.60	q
11	2	Jerry Jeremiah	Vanuatu	21.87	q
12	3	Sunday Maweni	Botswana	21.89	q
13	3	Odiya Silweya	Malawi	22.15	q
14	2	Maloni Bole	Fiji	22.20	
15	1	Michael Dwyer	Canada	22.22	Q
16	1	Reuben Kaiaha Wotu	Vanuatu	22.50	Q
17	1	Clifford Sibusiso Mamba	Swaziland	22.87	Q
18	3	William Akanoa	Cook Islands	23.55	
	1	Linford Christie	England	DNS	
	1	Cameron Sharp	Scotland	DNS	

=== Semifinals ===
Qualification: First 4 of each semifinal qualified directly (Q) for the final.

Wind:
Heat 1: +1.6 m/s, Heat 2: +2.6 m/s

Rank	Heat	Name	Nationality	Time	Notes
1	2	Atlee Mahorn	Canada	20.68	Q
2	2	Todd Bennett	England	20.86	Q
3	2	Michael Dwyer	Canada	20.97	Q
4	2	Robert Stone	Australia	21.03	Q
5	1	John Dinan	Australia	21.14	Q
6	1	John Regis	England	21.23	Q
7	1	Simon Baird	Northern Ireland	21.28	Q
8	1	Ben Johnson	Canada	21.28	Q
9	1	George McCallum	Scotland	21.39	
10	2	Miles Murphy	Australia	21.44	
11	2	Brian Whittle	Scotland	21.69	
12	2	Jerry Jeremiah	Vanuatu	21.90	
13	1	Sunday Maweni	Botswana	22.21	
14	1	Odiya Silweya	Malawi	22.41	
15	1	Reuben Kaiaha Wotu	Vanuatu	22.88	
16	2	Clifford Sibusiso Mamba	Swaziland	22.89	

=== Final ===
Wind: +2.2 m/s

Rank	Lane	Name	Nationality	Time	Notes
1st place, gold medalist(s)	4	Atlee Mahorn	Canada	20.31	
2nd place, silver medalist(s)	3	Todd Bennett	England	20.54	
3rd place, bronze medalist(s)	2	Ben Johnson	Canada	20.64	
4	5	Robert Stone	Australia	20.94	
5	1	Simon Baird	Northern Ireland	20.96	
6	6	Michael Dwyer	Canada	20.98	
7	8	John Dinan	Australia	21.07	
8	7	John Regis	England	21.08	
