= Athletics at the 1986 Commonwealth Games – Men's 100 metres =

Men's 100 metres at the 1986 Commonwealth Games
- Venue: Meadowbank Stadium
- Dates: 26-27 July
- Competitors: 19 from 11 nations
- Winning time: 10.07

Medalists
gold medal	Ben Johnson	Canada
silver medal	Linford Christie	England
bronze medal	Mike McFarlane	England

The men's 100 metres event at the 1986 Commonwealth Games was held at the Meadowbank Stadium in Edinburgh on 26 and 27 July 1986.

The winning margin was 0.21 seconds which as of 2024 remains the only time the men's 100 metres was won by more than 0.2 seconds at these games since the introduction of fully automatic timing.

== Results ==
=== Heats ===
Qualification: First 4 of each heat (Q) and the next 4 fastest (q) qualified for the semifinals.

Wind:

- Heat 1: +2.0 m/s
- Heat 2: +3.0 m/s
- Heat 3: +2.5 m/s

Rank	Heat	Name	Nationality	Time	Notes
1	2	Ben Johnson	Canada	10.15	Q
2	2	Jamie Henderson	Scotland	10.29	Q
3	1	Linford Christie	England	10.31	Q
4	3	Elliot Bunney	Scotland	10.32	Q
5	2	Mike McFarlane	England	10.38	Q
6	2	Simon Baird	Northern Ireland	10.40	Q
7	1	Desai Williams	Canada	10.49	Q
7	3	Clarence Callender	England	10.49	Q
9	2	Robert Stone	Australia	10.51	q
10	3	Gerrard Keating	Australia	10.56	Q
11	1	Cameron Sharp	Scotland	10.57	Q
12	1	Jerry Jeremiah	Vanuatu	10.66	Q
13	3	Michael Dwyer	Canada	10.81	Q
14	3	Maloni Bole	Fiji	10.94	q
15	3	Nelson Chan Ka Chiu	Hong Kong	10.95	q
16	1	Chris Perry	Australia	11.00	q
17	2	Sunday Maweni	Botswana	11.01	
18	2	Clifford Sibusiso Mamba	Swaziland	11.05	
19	1	William Akanoa	Cook Islands	11.81	

=== Semifinals ===
Qualification: First 4 of each semifinal qualified directly (Q) for the final.

Wind:

- Heat 1: -1.5 m/s
- Heat 2: +3.2 m/s

Rank	Heat	Name	Nationality	Time	Notes
1	2	Ben Johnson	Canada	10.18	Q
2	1	Linford Christie	England	10.29	Q
2	2	Mike McFarlane	England	10.29	Q
4	2	Elliot Bunney	Scotland	10.31	Q
5	2	Clarence Callender	England	10.32	Q
6	1	Desai Williams	Canada	10.41	Q
7	2	Michael Dwyer	Canada	10.42	
8	2	Robert Stone	Australia	10.47	
9	1	Jamie Henderson	Scotland	10.59	Q
10	1	Gerrard Keating	Australia	10.60	Q
11	1	Simon Baird	Northern Ireland	10.62	
12	1	Cameron Sharp	Scotland	10.63	
13	2	Jerry Jeremiah	Vanuatu	10.79	
14	1	Maloni Bole	Fiji	10.96	
15	2	Chris Perry	Australia	11.03	
16	1	Nelson Chan Ka Chiu	Hong Kong	11.11	

=== Final ===
Wind: +1.6 m/s

Rank	Lane	Name	Nationality	Time	Notes
1st place, gold medalist(s)	3	Ben Johnson	Canada	10.07	
2nd place, silver medalist(s)	6	Linford Christie	England	10.28	
3rd place, bronze medalist(s)	4	Mike McFarlane	England	10.35	
4	1	Desai Williams	Canada	10.36	
5	5	Elliot Bunney	Scotland	10.37	
6	7	Clarence Callender	England	10.42	
7	2	Gerrard Keating	Australia	10.55	
8	8	Jamie Henderson	Scotland	10.68	
