= Athletics at the 1986 Commonwealth Games – Men's 4 × 100 metres relay =

Men's 4 × 100 metres relay at the Commonwealth Games

The men's 4 × 100 metres relay event at the 1986 Commonwealth Games was held on 2 August at the Meadowbank Stadium in Edinburgh.

== Results ==
Rank	Lane	Nation	Athletes	Time	Notes
1st place, gold medalist(s)	2	Canada	Mark McKoy, Atlee Mahorn, Desai Williams, Ben Johnson	39.15	
2nd place, silver medalist(s)	6	England	Lincoln Asquith, Daley Thompson, Mike McFarlane, Clarence Callender	39.19	
3rd place, bronze medalist(s)	5	Scotland	Jamie Henderson, Cameron Sharp, George McCallum, Elliot Bunney	40.41	
4	4	Fiji	Maloni Bole, Joseph Rodan, Albert Miller, Samuela Yavala	43.11	
	3	Australia	Robert Stone, John Dinan, Gary Honey, Gerrard Keating	DQ	
