= Swimming at the 2014 Commonwealth Games – Women's 100 metre backstroke =

Women's 100 metre backstroke at the 2014 Commonwealth Games
- Venue: Tollcross International Swimming Centre
- Dates: 25 July 2014 (heats & semis); 26 July 2014 (final)
- Competitors: 28 from 15 nations
- Winning time: 59.37 GR

Medalists
gold medal	Emily Seebohm	Australia
silver medal	Georgia Davies	Wales
bronze medal	Belinda Hocking	Australia

The women's 100 metre backstroke event at the 2014 Commonwealth Games as part of the swimming programme took place on 25 and 26 July at the Tollcross International Swimming Centre in Glasgow, Scotland.

The medals were presented by Suzanne Weckend-Dill, Athlete Representative of the Commonwealth Games Federation and the quaichs were presented by James Hickman, Global Sports Marketing Manager of Speedo.

== Records ==
Prior to this competition, the existing world and Commonwealth Games records were as follows.

World record	Gemma Spofforth (GBR)	58.12	Rome, Italy	28 July 2009
Commonwealth record	Gemma Spofforth (ENG)	58.12	Rome, Italy	28 July 2009
Games record	Emily Seebohm (AUS)	59.53	Delhi, India	9 October 2010

The following records were established during the competition:

Date	Event	Name	Nationality	Time	Record
25 July	Heat	Emily Seebohm	Australia	59.51	GR
26 July	Final	Emily Seebohm	Australia	59.37	GR

== Results ==
=== Heats ===
Rank	Heat	Lane	Name	Nationality	Time	Notes
1	4	4	Emily Seebohm	Australia	59.51	Q, GR
2	2	4	Belinda Hocking	Australia	59.78	Q
3	4	5	Sinead Russell	Canada	1:00.15	Q
4	3	5	Lauren Quigley	England	1:00.67	Q
5	4	3	Brooklynn Snodgrass	Canada	1:00.70	Q
6	2	5	Elizabeth Simmonds	England	1:00.79	Q
7	3	4	Georgia Davies	Wales	1:00.86	Q
8	2	6	Kathleen Dawson	Scotland	1:00.91	Q
9	3	3	Madison Wilson	Australia	1:01.05	Q
10	2	3	Hilary Caldwell	Canada	1:01.10	Q
11	4	6	Jessica Fullalove	England	1:01.58	Q
12	3	2	Rachel Williams	Wales	1:02.98	Q
13	3	6	Jessica Ashley-Cooper	South Africa	1:03.61	Q
14	2	2	Danielle Stirrat	Wales	1:04.76	Q
15	3	7	Kimiko Raheem	Sri Lanka	1:06.36	Q
=16	4	7	Danielle Hill	Northern Ireland	1:07.18	QSO
=16	3	8	Talisa Lanoe	Kenya	1:07.18	QSO
18	4	1	Lauren Hew	Cayman Islands	1:07.34	
19	2	7	Bethany Firth	Northern Ireland	1:08.30	
20	3	1	Lara Butler	Cayman Islands	1:08.37	
21	4	8	Courtney Butcher	Guernsey	1:08.46	
22	2	1	Danielle Awori	Kenya	1:08.63	
23	1	4	Evelina Afoa	Samoa	1:09.13	
24	1	5	Anita Field	Kenya	1:11.08	
25	1	3	Kiran Khan	Pakistan	1:13.91	
26	2	8	Savannah Tkatchenko	Papua New Guinea	1:14.90	
	1	6	Areeba Shaikh	Pakistan		DSQ
	4	2	Tao Li	Singapore		DNS

==== Qualification swim-off ====
Rank	Lane	Name	Nationality	Time	Notes
1	5	Danielle Hill	Northern Ireland	1:05.36	Q
2	4	Talisa Lanoe	Kenya	1:07.30	

=== Semifinals ===
Rank	Heat	Lane	Name	Nationality	Time	Notes
1	2	4	Emily Seebohm	Australia	59.59	Q
2	2	6	Georgia Davies	Wales	59.63	Q
3	2	5	Sinead Russell	Canada	59.91	Q
=4	1	3	Elizabeth Simmonds	England	59.98	Q
=4	1	4	Belinda Hocking	Australia	59.98	Q
6	2	3	Brooklynn Snodgrass	Canada	1:00.26	Q
7	2	2	Madison Wilson	Australia	1:00.34	Q
8	1	5	Lauren Quigley	England	1:00.37	Q
9	1	2	Hilary Caldwell	Canada	1:00.77	
10	1	6	Kathleen Dawson	Scotland	1:01.17	
11	2	7	Jessica Fullalove	England	1:01.20	
12	1	7	Rachel Williams	Wales	1:02.48	
13	2	1	Jessica Ashley-Cooper	South Africa	1:03.07	
14	1	1	Danielle Stirrat	Wales	1:04.86	
15	1	8	Danielle Hill	Northern Ireland	1:06.17	
16	2	8	Kimiko Raheem	Sri Lanka	1:06.33	

=== Final ===
Rank	Lane	Name	Nationality	Time	Notes
1st place, gold medalist(s)	4	Emily Seebohm	Australia	59.37	GR
2nd place, silver medalist(s)	5	Georgia Davies	Wales	59.58	
3rd place, bronze medalist(s)	6	Belinda Hocking	Australia	59.93	
4	8	Lauren Quigley	England	1:00.19	
5	2	Elizabeth Simmonds	England	1:00.26	
6	3	Sinead Russell	Canada	1:00.27	
7	1	Madison Wilson	Australia	1:00.45	
8	7	Brooklynn Snodgrass	Canada	1:00.58	
