= Lawn bowls at the 1990 Commonwealth Games =

- Venue: Pakuranga Bowls Club, Pakuranga Heights
- Location: Auckland, New Zealand
- Dates: 24 January – 3 February 1990

Lawn bowls at the 1990 Commonwealth Games was the 13th appearance of the lawn bowls at the Commonwealth Games. Competition at the 1990 Commonwealth Games took place at the Pakuranga Bowls Club in Pakuranga Heights in Auckland, New Zealand, from 24 January until 3 February 1990.

Australia topped the lawn bowls medal table by virtue of winning three gold medals.

Scotland won the men's fours.

== Medal table ==
* Host nation (New Zealand)

Rank	Nation	Gold	Silver	Bronze	Total
1	Australia	3	1	0	4
2	New Zealand*	1	2	2	5
3	Scotland	1	0	1	2
4	Papua New Guinea	1	0	0	1
5	Hong Kong	0	1	1	2
5	Northern Ireland	0	1	1	2
7	Canada	0	1	0	1
8	England	0	0	1	1
Totals (8 entries)		6	6	6	18

== Medallists ==
Event	Gold	Silver	Bronze
Men's singles	(Australia) Rob Parrella	(Hong Kong) Mark McMahon	(Scotland) Richard Corsie
Men's pairs	(Australia) Ian Schuback; Trevor Morris	(Canada) Alf Wallace; George Boxwell	(New Zealand) Maurice Symes; Rowan Brassey
Men's fours	(Scotland) Denis Love; George Adrain; Ian Bruce; Willie Wood	(Northern Ireland) Jim Baker; John McCloughlin; Sammy Allen; Rodney McCutcheon	(New Zealand) Kevin Darling; Peter Shaw; Phil Skoglund; Stewart McConnell
Women's singles	(Papua New Guinea) Geua Vada Tau	(New Zealand) Millie Khan	(Northern Ireland) Margaret Johnston
Women's pairs	(New Zealand) Judy Howat; Marie Watson	(Australia) Edda Bonutto; Maureen Hobbs	(England) Mary Price; Jayne Roylance
Women's fours	(Australia) Audrey Rutherford; Daphne Shaw; Dorothy Roche; Marion Stevens	(New Zealand) Adrienne Lambert; Lyn McLean; Marlene Castle; Rhoda Ryan	(Hong Kong) Jenny Wallis; Naty Rozario; Angela Chau; Yee Lai Lee

== Results ==
=== Men's singles – round robin ===
==== Section A ====
Pos	Player	P	W	L	F	A	Pts
1	(Hong Kong) Mark McMahon	7	7	0	175	99	14
2	(Scotland) Richard Corsie	7	5	2	157	97	10
3	(New Zealand) Ian Dickison	7	5	2	162	115	10
4	(Wales) John Price	7	5	2	150	115	10
5	(Norfolk Island) Barry Wilson	7	3	4	126	153	6
6	(Samoa) Dick Hunt	7	2	5	121	161	4
7	(Botswana) Ray Mascarenhas	7	1	6	96	155	2
8	(Cook Islands) Philip Ulrich	7	0	7	83	175	0

==== Section B ====
Pos	Player	P	W	L	F	A	Pts
1	(Australia) Rob Parrella	7	6	1	170	100	12
2	(England) David Bryant	7	6	1	164	97	12
3	(Northern Ireland) David Corkill	7	5	2	162	131	10
4	(Zimbabwe) Garin Beare	7	4	3	145	126	8
5	(Canada) Burnie Gill	7	4	3	146	129	8
6	(Guernsey) Mike Smith	7	2	5	105	141	4
7	(Papua New Guinea) Tau Tau	7	1	6	120	168	2
8	(India) Sreenivasa Pai	7	0	7	55	175	0

==== Finals ====
Third-place play-off
(Scotland) Corsie bt (England) Bryant 25–17
Final
(Australia) Parrella bt (Hong Kong) McMahon 25–14

=== Men's pairs – round robin ===
==== Section A ====
Pos	Player	P	W	D	L	F	A	Pts
1	(Australia) Ian Schuback & Trevor Morris	8	7	0	1	201	121	14
2	(New Zealand) Maurice Symes & Rowan Brassey	8	7	0	1	182	131	14
3	(England) Andy Thomson & Gary Smith	8	5	0	3	190	148	10
4	(Scotland) Angus Blair & Graham Robertson	8	4	0	4	174	158	8
5	(Zimbabwe) Richard Wightman & William Cumming	8	4	0	4	137	162	8
6	(Guernsey) Michael De Carteret & Norman Le Ber	8	3	1	4	167	177	7
7	(Jersey) David Le Marquand & Marcel Coutouly	8	2	1	5	155	179	5
8	(Northern Ireland) Ernie Parkinson & Victor Dallas	8	2	0	6	158	170	4
9	(Papua New Guinea) Kossy Torao & Phillip Guimap	8	1	0	7	112	230	2

==== Section B ====
Pos	Player	P	W	D	L	F	A	Pts
1	(Canada) Alf Wallace & George Boxwell	7	7	0	0	164	124	14
2	(Wales) Robert Weale & Will Thomas	7	6	0	1	174	116	12
3	(Hong Kong) Koon Leung Ho & Noel Kennedy	7	5	0	2	201	106	10
4	(Samoa) Peniamina Asi & Taituuga Rokeni	7	4	0	3	166	131	8
5	(India) Basant Rampuria & Vipin Dhawan	7	2	1	4	145	158	5
6	(Botswana) Johnie Kakakis & Thomas Foster	7	2	0	5	117	175	4
7	(Norfolk Island) Thornton Yager & William Adams	7	1	1	5	111	146	3
8	(Cook Islands) Ieremia Tuteru & Inatio Akaruru	7	0	0	7	101	223	0

==== Finals ====
Third-place play-off
New Zealand bt Wales 24–17
Final
Australia bt Canada 23–15

=== Men's fours – round robin ===
==== Section A ====
Pos	Player	P	W	D	L	F	A	Pts
1	(Northern Ireland) Jim Baker, John McCloughlin, Sammy Allen, Rodney McCutcheon	8	6	1	1	178	118	13
2	(Australia) Denis Dalton, Dennis Katunarich, Ken Woods, Rex Johnston	8	6	0	2	186	111	12
3	(Hong Kong) Ken Wallis, Mel Stewart, Roger Pickford, Bill McMahon	8	6	0	2	175	125	12
4	(England) Tony Allcock, Gary Harrington, John Ottaway, Roy Cutts	8	5	1	2	180	118	11
5	(Wales) Alan Beer, David Vowles, Dai Wilkins, Trevor Mounty	8	5	0	3	178	141	10
6	(Zimbabwe) Cornelius Krige, Duncan Naysmith, Ian Henderson, Jacob van Deventer	8	2	0	6	135	191	4
7	(Samoa) Fepuleai Sae, Saivaega Vasa, Tapusatele Tuatagaloa, Taualeoo Faasoo	8	2	0	6	150	210	4
8	(Norfolk Island) Garry Ryan, John Christian, Keith Turton, Sidney Cooper	8	2	0	6	131	191	4
9	(Eswatini) David Clarke, David Goddard, Hayley Abrahams, John Kemp	8	1	0	7	130	238	2

==== Section B ====
Pos	Player	P	W	D	L	F	A	Pts
1	(Scotland) Denis Love, George Adrain, Ian Bruce, Willie Wood	7	6	1	0	162	101	13
2	(New Zealand) Kevin Darling, Peter Shaw, Phil Skoglund, Stewart McConnell	7	5	0	2	176	102	10
3	(Papua New Guinea) Ambane Wau, Karo Vali, Martin Seeto, Tau Nancie	7	3	2	3	142	125	8
4	(Canada) Dave Brown, Peter Mutter, Robert Scullion, Bill Boettger	7	4	0	3	151	136	8
5	(Botswana) Cliff Richardson, David Murray, John Baylis, John Thackray	7	3	0	5	133	143	6
6	(Cook Islands) Abela Amarama, David Towgood, Eric Ponia, Toka Rahui	7	3	0	5	114	166	6
7	(Zambia) Ian Henderson, Corneilus Krige, Duncan Naysmith, Jacob van Deventer	7	1	1	5	108	134	3
8	(India) Gopiram Sharma, Pratap Bengani, Rajendra Bengani, Surya Saigal	7	1	0	6	103	182	2

==== Finals ====
Third-place play-off
New Zealand bt Australia 21-13
Final
Scotland bt Northern Ireland 19–14

=== Women's singles – round robin ===
==== Section A ====
Pos	Player	P	W	L	F	A	Pts
1	(New Zealand) Millie Khan	8	8	0	200	10	16
2	(Australia) Audrey Hefford	8	6	2	180	111	12
3	(England) Wendy Line	8	5	3	195	163	10
4	(Zimbabwe) Anne Morris	8	4	4	180	173	8
5	(Samoa) Vaiee Siaosi	8	4	4	149	190	8
6	(Hong Kong) Rosemary McMahon	8	3	5	139	172	6
7	(Jersey) Sheila Syvret	8	3	5	143	183	6
8	(Norfolk Island) Emmeline Browning	8	2	6	126	190	4
9	(Botswana) Babs Anderson	8	1	7	165	185	2

==== Section B ====
Pos	Player	P	W	D	L	F	A	Pts
1	(Papua New Guinea) Geua Vada Tau	7	7	0	0	176	99	14
2	(Northern Ireland) Margaret Johnston	7	6	0	1	169	103	12
3	(Scotland) Senga McCrone	7	4	0	3	157	137	8
4	(Wales) Janet Ackland	7	4	0	3	140	135	8
5	(Guernsey) Kathleen Dodd	7	2	1	4	119	151	5
6	(Zambia) Beatrice Mali	7	2	0	5	137	171	4
7	(Cook Islands) Ngamarama Benjamina	7	2	0	5	108	161	4
8	(India) Fatima Reimer	7	0	1	6	116	165	1

==== Finals ====
Third-place play-off
(Northern Ireland) Johnston bt (New Zealand) Hefford 25–15
Final
(Papua New Guinea) Vada Tau bt (New Zealand) Khan 25–18

=== Women's pairs – round robin ===
==== Section A ====
Pos	Player	P	W	D	L	F	A	Pts
1	(Australia) Edda Bonutto & Maureen Hobbs	7	6	0	1	197	112	12
2	(England) Mary Price & Jayne Roylance	7	5	1	1	152	118	11
3	(Northern Ireland) Eileen Bell & Nan Allely	7	4	0	3	142	130	8
4	(Papua New Guinea) Alu David & Kathy Panap	7	3	1	3	155	153	7
5	(Cook Islands) Rouru Paniani & Tereapii Ulrich	7	3	0	4	131	146	6
6	(Canada) Elaine Jones & Roseann Toal	7	3	0	4	135	162	6
7	(Wales) Mary Hughes & Pam Griffiths	7	2	0	5	124	144	4
8	(Zimbabwe) Judith Penfold & Winnona Butcher	7	1	0	6	98	169	2

==== Section B ====
Pos	Player	P	W	D	L	F	A	Pts
1	(New Zealand) Judy Howat & Marie Watson	6	5	0	1	160	95	10
2	(Scotland) Frances Whyte & Sarah Gourlay	6	5	0	1	132	84	10
3	(Guernsey) Hazel Dorey & Sonia Murphy	6	4	0	2	128	106	8
4	(Botswana) Heather Roberts & Jacqueline Rhodes	6	3	0	3	123	110	6
5	(Samoa) Faalelai Tuatagoloa & Marie Toalepaiaii	6	3	0	3	115	130	6
6	(Norfolk Island) Anne Paton & Gabrielle Robertson	6	1	0	5	96	140	2
7	(Hong Kong) Gillian Sperring & Josephine Hollis	6	0	0	6	62	151	0

==== Finals ====
Third-place play-off
England bt Scotland 22–14
Final
New Zealand bt Australia 23–13

=== Women's fours – round robin ===
==== Section A ====
Pos	Player	P	W	D	L	F	A	Pts
1	(New Zealand) Adrienne Lambert, Lynette McLean, Marlene Castle, Rhoda Ryan	7	6	0	1	161	98	12
2	(Scotland) Ann Watson, Annette Evans, Janice Maxwell, Joyce Lindores	7	5	0	2	141	135	10
3	(England) Dorothy Lewis, Mavis Steele, Norma May, Norma Shaw	7	4	0	3	147	120	8
4	(Wales) Ann Dainton, Linda Evans, Rita Jones, Stella Oliver	7	4	0	3	150	114	8
5	(Zimbabwe) Joan du Preez, Margaret Mills, Margaret Whittall, Onei Dophin	7	3	1	3	172	126	7
6	(Papua New Guinea) Kathy Sigimet, Maggie Worri, Norma Samba, Walo Pisak	7	3	1	3	130	162	7
7	(Norfolk Island) Beatrice Karl, Carmen Bishop, Esterlina Greenham, Pauline Turton	7	1	0	6	92	161	2
8	(Samoa) Faamomoi Rokeni, Leute Fua, Seupepe Sasagi, Su Neemia	7	1	0	6	107	184	2

==== Section B ====
Pos	Player	P	W	D	L	F	A	Pts
1	(Australia) Audrey Rutherford, Daphne Shaw, Dorothy Roche, Marion Stevens	6	6	0	0	189	80	12
2	(Hong Kong) Jenny Wallis, Naty Rozario, Angela Chau, Yee Lai Lee	6	5	0	1	125	103	10
3	(Botswana) Eve Thomas, Jane Mitchell, Shirley Baylis, Yvonne Richards	6	4	0	2	150	108	8
4	(Canada) Clarice Fitzpatrick, Dorothy Bennett, Dorothy Macey, Marlene Cleutinx	6	2	0	4	113	135	4
5	(Cook Islands) Makiua Tairi, Tanimetua Harry, Tara Pita, Toka Tuteru	6	2	0	4	108	137	4
6	(Eswatini) Cynthia Thompson, Liz James, Mariana Goddard, Wendy Vickery	6	1	0	5	88	140	2
7	(Zambia) Ann Meir, Elizabeth Naysmith, Helen Graham, Marguerite De Brito	6	1	0	5	86	156	2

==== Finals ====
Third-place play-off
Hong Kong bt Scotland 21–20
Final
Australia bt New Zealand 20-18

== See also ==
- List of Commonwealth Games medallists in lawn bowls
- Lawn bowls at the Commonwealth Games
