= Grant Knox =

Scottish lawn bowler

Personal information
- Nationality: British (Scottish)
- Born: 8 June 1960

Sport
- Sport: Lawn bowls
- Club: Armadale BC (outdoor); West Lothian (indoor)
Medal record
Representing Scotland
World Outdoor Championships
| Bronze medal – third place | 1988 Auckland | team |
Commonwealth Games
| Gold medal – first place | 1986 Edinburgh | pairs |

Grant Knox (born 8 June 1960) is a former Scottish international lawn and indoor bowler who competed at the Commonwealth Games and won a gold medal.

== Biography ==
Knox took up bowling at the age of 14 because of his father Joe and together they won the Armadel pairs and the 1981 and 1985 Aberdeen Championships.

Knox was selected to rpresent the Scottish team at the 1986 Commonwealth Games in Edinburgh, Scotland. A joiner by profession at the time of the Games he participated in the pairs event and won a gold medal in the pairs with George Adrain at the
