= Cayman Islands at the 2010 Commonwealth Games =

- Flag of the Cayman Islands
- CGF code: CAY
- CGA: Cayman Islands Olympic Committee
- Website: caymanolympic.org.ky

in Delhi, India
- Competitors: 17
- Flag bearers: Opening: Closing:
- Medals: Gold 1 Silver 0 Bronze 0 Total 1

Commonwealth Games appearances (overview)
- 1978; 1982; 1986; 1990; 1994; 1998; 2002; 2006; 2010; 2014; 2018; 2022; 2026; 2030

Cayman Islands competed in the 2010 Commonwealth Games held in Delhi, India, from 3 to 14 October 2010. They won their first ever gold medal through Cydonie Mothersille in the 200m athletics for women.

== Medalists ==
| Medal | Name | Sport | Event | Date |
|---|---|---|---|---|
| Gold | Cydonie Mothersill | Athletics | Women's 200m | October 12 |

=== Swimming ===
| Event | Swimmer(s) | Heats | | Final | |
| Event | Swimmer(s) | Result | Rank | Result | Rank |
|---|---|---|---|---|---|
| 200m Women's Freestyle | Tori Alden Flowers | 02:21.80 | 27 | DNQ | 27 |
