= Maureen Hobbs =

Personal information
- Nationality: Australia
Medal record
Representing Australia
Commonwealth Games
Silver medal – second place	1990 Auckland	pairs

Maureen Elizabeth Hobbs is a female former international lawn bowler from New Zealand.

She won a silver medal in the women's pairs with Edda Bonutto at the 1990 Commonwealth Games in Auckland.
