= Naty Rozario =

Personal information
- Nationality: Hong Kong
Medal record
Representing (Hong Kong) Hong Kong
World Outdoor Championships
Bronze medal – third place	1988 Auckland	triples
Commonwealth Games
Bronze medal – third place	1990 Auckland	fours

Natividad 'Naty' Rozario is a former Hong Kong international lawn bowler.

Rozario won a bronze medal in the triples at the 1988 World Outdoor Bowls Championship in Auckland with Rae O'Donnell and Sandra Zakoske.

She also won a bronze medal in the fours at the 1990 Commonwealth Games in Auckland with Jenny Wallis, Angela Chau and Yee Lai Lee.
