= Cayman Islands at the 2006 Commonwealth Games =

- Flag of the Cayman Islands
- CG code: CAY
- CGA: Cayman Islands Olympic Committee
- Website: caymanolympic.org.ky

in Melbourne, Australia
- Flag bearers: Opening: Closing:
- Medals: Gold 0 Silver 0 Bronze 0 Total 0

Commonwealth Games appearances (overview)
- 1978; 1982; 1986; 1990; 1994; 1998; 2002; 2006; 2010; 2014; 2018; 2022; 2026; 2030

The Official Logo of the Cayman Islands Commonwealth Games Association

The British overseas territory of the Cayman Islands was represented at the 2006 Commonwealth Games in Melbourne.

== Medals ==
- None

== Results by event ==
=== Athletics ===
Ronald Forbes
Robert Ibeh
Stephen Antoine Ovar Johnson
Michael Letterlough
Cydonie Mothersille
Kirk Streete-Thompson

=== Cycling ===
Duke Perrigoff Merren

=== Shooting ===
Thomas George Ebanks
Robert Harris
Christopher Jackson
Edison McLean

=== Squash ===
Jeffery Broderick
Chantelle Day

=== Swimming ===
Shaune Fraser
Andrew Mackay
Jennifer Powell
Heather Roffey

== See also ==
- Cayman Islands at the 2004 Summer Olympics
- Cayman Islands at the 2007 Pan American Games
- Cayman Islands at the 2008 Summer Olympics
