= Willie Harkness =

Scottish international lawn bowler

Personal information
- Nationality: British (Scottish)
- Born: c.1964

Sport
- Sport: Lawn and indoor bowls
- Club: Glengowan BC, Coatbridge IBC

Willie Harkness (born c.1964) is a former international lawn bowler from Scotland who competed at the Commonwealth Games.

== Biography ==
At the age of 13 he won the Adam Howieson Open Youth singles title and the Philpstoun singles title and later won the national junior singles in 1981. Harkness was a member of the Glengowan Bowls Club in Caldercruix and the Coatbridge Indoor Bowls Club and represented Scotland at international level both outdoors and indoors.

Harkness represented the Scottish team at the 1986 Commonwealth Games in Edinburgh, Scotland, where he competed in the fours event, with Jim Boyle, Graham Robertson and Malcolm Graham, finishing in sixth place. At the time of the Games he was a planning technician with the West Lothian District Council and lived at Church Court in Philpstoun.

He was the runner-up of Scotland in the pairs at the 1986 Scottish National Bowls Championships.
