= Ian Bruce (bowls) =

Scottish lawn bowler

Personal information
- Nationality: British (Scottish)
- Born: 2 January 1952

Sport
- Sport: Lawn and indoor bowls
- Club: Kincardine O'Neil BC
Medal record
Representing Scotland
Commonwealth Games
Gold medal – first place	1990 Auckland	fours

Ian Stanley Bruce (born 2 January 1952) is a former international lawn bowler from Scotland who competed at the Commonwealth Games.

== Biography ==
Bruce represented the Scottish team and won a gold medal when he was part of the fours team at the 1990 Commonwealth Games in Auckland, New Zealand. The team consisted of George Adrain, Denis Love and Willie Wood. At the time of the Games he was an assistant bank manager.
