= Alan Beer (bowls) =

Welsh international lawn bowler

Personal information
- Nationality: British (Welsh)
- Born: c.1944

Sport
- Sport: Lawn and indoor bowls
- Club: Aberavon BC; Swansea IBC

Alan Beer (born c.1944) is a former international lawn bowler from Wales who competed at the Commonwealth Games.

== Biography ==
Beer was a member of the Aberavon Bowls Club and the Swansea Indoor Bowls Club. He represented Wales at international level.

Beer represented the Welsh team at the 1990 Commonwealth Games in Auckland, New Zealand, where he competed in the fours event, with Trevor Mounty, David Vowles and Dai Wilkins.
