= Tasmyn Benny =

New Zealand boxer (born 1998)

Personal information
- Nationality: New Zealander
- Born: 20 October 1998 (age 27)
- Height: 1.65 m (5 ft 5 in)
- Weight: 48 kg (106 lb)

Sport
- Sport: Boxing
- Weight class: Light flyweight
Medal record
Women's amateur boxing
Representing New Zealand
Commonwealth Games
Bronze medal – third place	2018 Gold Coast	Light flyweight

Tasmyn Benny (born 20 October 1998) is a boxer from New Zealand. In 2018 she competed in boxing at the Commonwealth Games on the Gold Coast, Australia, winning a bronze medal. As of March 2018 she is the top ranked 48 kg Elite Female boxer in New Zealand, and seventh ranked in the Commonwealth.

Benny is from Thames, in the North Island of New Zealand. She is of Ngāti Porou, Ngāpuhi and Waikato Tainui descent. She attended Turua Primary School before Hauraki Plains College, and joined the Royal New Zealand Navy after completing high school. Benny played netball as a teenager, and started boxing to get fit for games, however she enjoyed boxing so much she gave up netball to focus on boxing. Her first competitive fight was at the age of 16.

== Awards and recognitions ==
- 2019 Gladrap Boxing Awards Amateur of the year (Nominated)
