= Yee Lai Lee =

Personal information
- Nationality: Hong Kong
Medal record
Representing (Hong Kong) Hong Kong
Commonwealth Games
Bronze medal – third place	1990 Auckland	fours

Yee Lai Lee is a former Hong Kong international lawn bowler.

She won a bronze medal in the fours at the 1990 Commonwealth Games in Auckland with Naty Rozario, Jenny Wallis and Angela Chau.
