= Senga McCrone =

Scottish lawn bowls player (1934–2020)

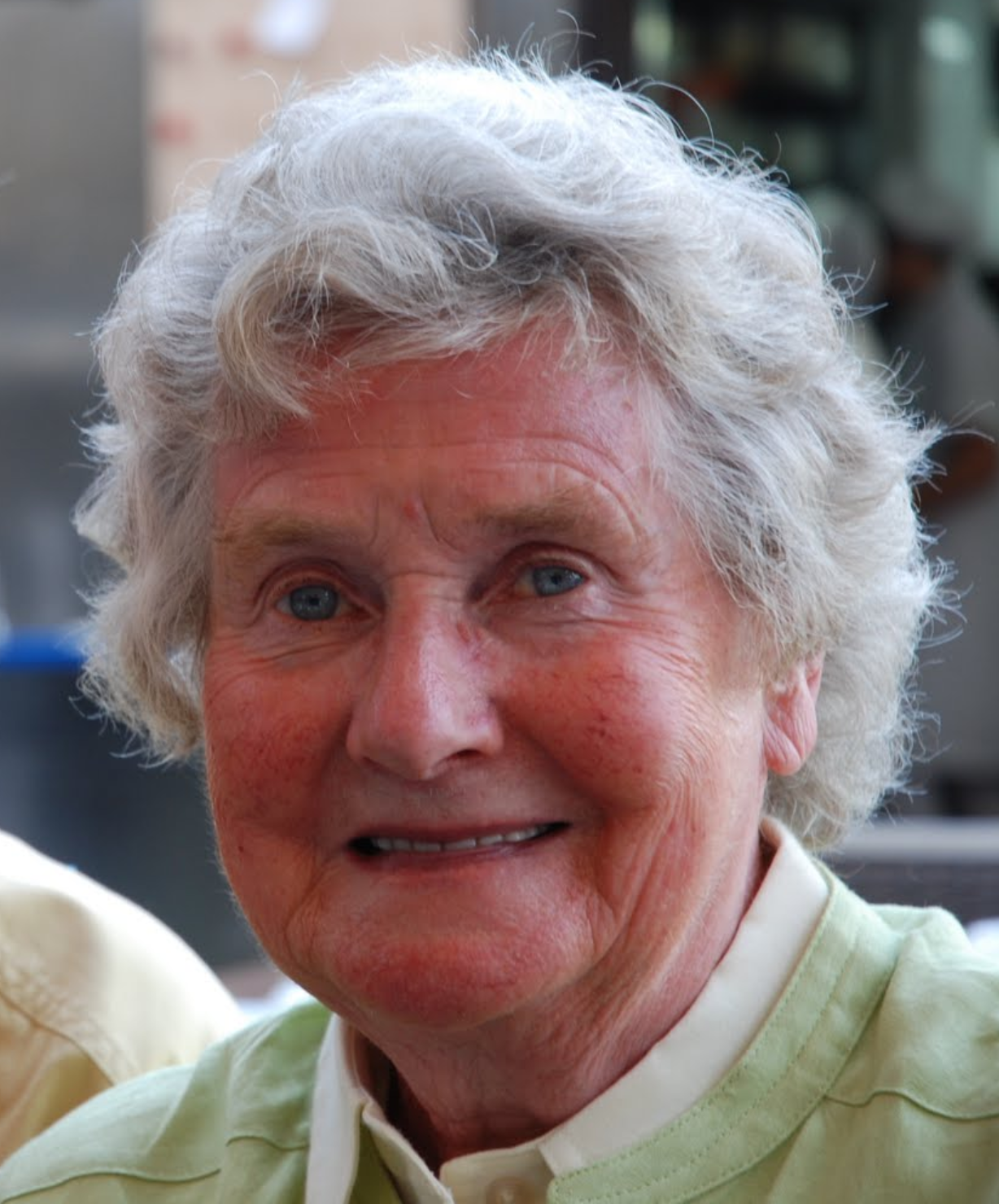

Personal information
- Born: 11 June 1934 Kilmarnock, Scotland
- Died: 29 November 2020 (aged 86) Melrose, Scottish Borders, Scotland

Sport
- Club: Lisnagarvey BC; Buccleuch BC, Hawick
Medal record
Representing Scotland
World Outdoor Championships
Gold medal – first place	1992 Ayr	fours
Gold medal – first place	1992 Ayr	team
Commonwealth Games
Silver medal – second place	1986 Edinburgh	singles
Atlantic Bowls Championships
Gold medal – first place	1993 Florida	fours

Senga McCrone (11 June 1934 – 29 November 2020) was a Scottish international lawn and indoor bowler.

== Biography ==
In 1971 as a member of the Lisnagarvey Club she won the 1971 Irish National Bowls Championships fours title. The success meant qualification for the British Isles Bowls Championships and subsequently she won the fours title in 1972 for the combined Ireland team.

McCrone represented the Scottish team at the 1986 Commonwealth Games in Edinburgh, Scotland, and won a silver medal in the singles, becoming the first Scottish woman to win a Commonwealth Games medal in bowls.

McCrone represented the Scottish team at the 1990 Commonwealth Games in Auckland, New Zealand, where she competed in the singles event. At the time of the Games she was a bookkeeper.

She won a gold medal in the fours at the 1992 World Outdoor Bowls Championship in Worthing but pulled out of the 1994 Commonwealth Games team, following a dispute over her position in the fours team.

In 1993 she won the fours gold medal at the inaugural Atlantic Bowls Championships.

== Personal life ==
Senga grew up in Hurlford, East Ayrshire before moving to Northern Ireland in her thirties. It was during this time that she began bowling for the Lisnagarvey Bowling Club near Belfast. In later life she lived in Hawick with her husband Jimmy and they had two sons. She died on 29 November 2020 at the Borders General Hospital.
