= Denis Love =

Scottish lawn bowler (1955–2012)

Personal information
- Nationality: British (Scottish)
- Born: 10 June 1952
- Died: 3 January 2012 (aged 56–57)

Sport
- Sport: Lawn and indoor bowls
- Club: Dumfries BC
Medal record
Representing Scotland
Commonwealth Games
Gold medal – first place	1990 Auckland	fours

Denis Love (10 June 1952 – 2012), was a Scottish international lawn bowler.

== Biography ==
Love represented the Scottish team at the 1990 Commonwealth Games in Auckland, New Zealand, where he competed in the fours event, and won a gold medal. The team consisted of George Adrain, Ian Bruce and Willie Wood.
