= Cayman Islands at the Commonwealth Games =

- Flag of the Cayman Islands
- CG code: CAY
- CGA: Cayman Islands Olympic Committee
- Website: caymanolympic.org.ky
- Medals Ranked 47th: Gold 1 Silver 0 Bronze 1 Total 2

Commonwealth Games appearances (overview)
- 1978; 1982; 1986; 1990; 1994; 1998; 2002; 2006; 2010; 2014; 2018; 2022; 2026; 2030

The Cayman Islands have attended ten Commonwealth Games, beginning in 1978. They have won two medals during this time: a bronze from Kareem Streete-Thompson in the 2002 long jump and a gold by Cydonie Mothersille at the 2010 Games in the 200 metres.

== Medal tally ==
| | (gold) | (silver) | (bronze) | Total |
|---|---|---|---|---|
| Cayman Islands | 1 | 0 | 1 | 2 |

| Games | Gold | Silver | Bronze | Total |
|---|---|---|---|---|
| 1978 Edmonton | 0 | 0 | 0 | 0 |
| 1982 Brisbane | 0 | 0 | 0 | 0 |
| 1986 Edinburgh | 0 | 0 | 0 | 0 |
| 1990 Auckland | 0 | 0 | 0 | 0 |
| 1994 Victoria | 0 | 0 | 0 | 0 |
| 1998 Kuala Lumpur | 0 | 0 | 0 | 0 |
| 2002 Manchester | 0 | 0 | 1 | 1 |
| 2006 Melbourne | 0 | 0 | 0 | 0 |
| 2010 Delhi | 1 | 0 | 0 | 1 |
| 2014 Glasgow | 0 | 0 | 0 | 0 |
| 2018 Gold Coast | 0 | 0 | 0 | 0 |
| 2022 Birmingham | 0 | 0 | 0 | 0 |
| 2026 Glasgow | 0 | 0 | 0 | 0 |
| Total | 1 | 0 | 1 | 2 |
