= Boxing at the 2018 Commonwealth Games – Women's light flyweight =

Boxing competitions

Boxing – Women's light flyweight at the 2018 Commonwealth Games
- Venue: Oxenford Studios
- Dates: 8 – 14 April 2018
- Competitors: 8 from 8 nations

Medalists
gold medal	Mary Kom	India
silver medal	Kristina O'Hara	Northern Ireland
bronze medal	Anusha Koddithuwakku	Sri Lanka
bronze medal	Tasmyn Benny	New Zealand

The women's light flyweight boxing competitions at the 2018 Commonwealth Games in Gold Coast, Australia took place between 8 and 14 April at Oxenford Studios. Women light flyweights were limited to those boxers weighing less than 48 kilograms. This event made its Commonwealth Games debut.

Like all Commonwealth boxing events, the competition was a straight single-elimination tournament. Both semifinal losers were awarded bronze medals, so no boxers competed again after their first loss. Bouts consisted of three rounds of three minutes each, with one-minute breaks between rounds. Beginning this year, the competition was scored using the "must-ten" scoring system.

== Schedule ==
The schedule is as follows:

All times are Australian Eastern Standard Time (UTC+10)

Date	Time	Round
Sunday 8 April 2018	14:02/20:32	Quarter-finals
Wednesday 11 April 2018	14:02	Semi-finals
Saturday 14 April 2018	19:32	Final

== Results ==
The draw is as follows:

Quarterfinals
Brandy Barnes (CAY)
Anusha Koddithuwakku (SRI)	RSC
Mary Kom (IND)	5
Megan Gordon (SCO)	0
Kristina O'Hara (NIR)	3
Lynsey Holdaway (WAL)	2
Lethabo Modukanele (BOT)	0
Tasmyn Benny (NZL)	5

Semifinals
Anusha Koddithuwakku (SRI)	0
Mary Kom (IND)	5
Kristina O'Hara (NIR)	5
Tasmyn Benny (NZL)	0

Final
Mary Kom (IND)	5
Kristina O'Hara (NIR)	0
