= Trevor Mounty =

Welsh international lawn bowler

Personal information
- Nationality: British (Welsh)
- Born: c.1950

Sport
- Sport: Lawn and indoor bowls
- Club: Abertridwr BC; Merthyr Tydfil IBC
Medal record
Representing Wales
Welsh Nationals
Gold medal – first place	1976	triples
Gold medal – first place	1982	fours
Gold medal – first place	1990	fours

Trevor Mounty (born c.1950) is a former international lawn bowler from Wales who competed at the Commonwealth Games.

== Biography ==
Mounty a clothing cutter by profession was a member of the Abertridwr Bowls Club and the Merthyr Tydfil Indoor Bowls Club. He was a winner of the now defunct Welsh national U35 singles and represented Wales at international level.

Mounty represented the Welsh team at the 1990 Commonwealth Games in Auckland, New Zealand, where he competed in the fours event, with Alan Beer, David Vowles and Dai Wilkins.

He was a three-times champion of Wales at the Welsh National Bowls Championships, winning the triples in 1976 and the fours in 1982 and 1990.
