= Angela Chau =

Hong Kong lawn bowler (died 2020)

Personal information
- Nationality: Hongkonger
- Died: 31 October 2020

Sport
- Club: Club de Recreio
Medal record
Representing (Hong Kong) Hong Kong
Commonwealth Games
Bronze medal – third place	1990 Auckland	fours
Asia Pacific Bowls Championships
Silver medal – second place	1993 Victoria	fours
Bronze medal – third place	1993 Victoria	triples
Bronze medal – third place	1995 Dunedin	singles
Bronze medal – third place	1997 Warilla	triples
Bronze medal – third place	1999 Kuala Lumpur	triples
Bronze medal – third place	2001 Melbourne	triples

Sau Ling 'Angela' Chau (date of birth unknown - 2020) was a Hong Kong international lawn bowler.

== Bowls career ==
She won a bronze medal in the fours at the 1990 Commonwealth Games in Auckland with Naty Rozario, Jenny Wallis and Yee Lai Lee. In addition she competed at the 1994 Commonwealth Games.

She has won twenty national titles (two in the singles, four in the pairs, five in the triples and nine in the fours). In addition she won six medals at the Asia Pacific Bowls Championships.

Chau died on 31 October 2020.
