= Ken Wallis (bowls) =

Hong Kong lawn bowler

Personal information
- Nationality: Hongkonger
- Born: 1943 (age 82–83) England
Medal record
Representing (Hong Kong) Hong Kong
Commonwealth Games
| Bronze medal – third place | 1994 Victoria | fours |
Asia Pacific Bowls Championships
| Silver medal – second place | 1993 Victoria | fours |
| Bronze medal – third place | 1995 Dunedin | fours |

Kenneth G Wallis (born 1943) is a former Hong Kong international lawn bowler and footballer.

== Bowls career ==
Wallis competed for Hong Kong in the fours tournament at the 1990 Commonwealth Games.

Four years later he won a bronze medal in the singles at the 1994 Commonwealth Games in Canada. In addition he competed in the fours at the 1990 Commonwealth Games.

He won two medals at the Asia Pacific Bowls Championships.

== Football career ==
He was a member of the Hong Kong squad and played in the 1965 and 1966 Merdeka Cup.

== Personal life ==
He moved to Hong Kong from Britain in 1962 to join the Royal Hong Kong Police Force. He married Jenny Wallis and they moved to Australia when Jenny was appointed director of the Hong Kong Economic & Trade Office in Sydney.
