= Greta Boyle =

Scottish international lawn bowler

Personal information
- Nationality: British (Scottish)

Sport
- Sport: Lawn and indoor bowls
- Club: Ardeer Recreation BC; Irvine Winton BC

Greta Boyle is a former international lawn bowler from Scotland who competed at the Commonwealth Games.

== Biography ==
Boyle was a member of the Ardeer Recreation Bowls Club and represented Scotland at international level.

In 1982 and 1983 she reached the final of the Scottish National Bowls Championships and was the winner of the 1982 Glasgow Bowling Association singles.

Boyle represented the Scottish team at the 1986 Commonwealth Games in Edinburgh, Scotland, where she competed in the pairs event, with Nan Mulholland.

She also bowled for Irvine Winton Bowls Club and won the 1989 Ayr Bowls tournament. In 1992 she emigrated to South Africa.
