= Swimming at the 2014 Commonwealth Games – Women's 50 metre backstroke =

Women's 50 metre backstroke at the 2014 Commonwealth Games
- Venue: Tollcross International Swimming Centre
- Dates: 28 July 2014 (heats & semis); 29 July 2014 (final)
- Competitors: 35 from 23 nations
- Winning time: 27.56 GR

Medalists
gold medal	Georgia Davies	Wales
silver medal	Lauren Quigley	England
bronze medal	Brooklynn Snodgrass	Canada

The women's 50 metre backstroke event at the 2014 Commonwealth Games as part of the swimming programme took place on 28 and 29 July at the Tollcross International Swimming Centre in Glasgow, Scotland.

The medals were presented by Helen Jaques, Aquatics Competition Manager, Glasgow 2014 and the quaichs were presented by Miriam Moyo, Commonwealth Games Federation Regional Vice-President, Africa and President of the National Olympic Committee of Zambia.

== Records ==
Prior to this competition, the existing world and Commonwealth Games records were as follows.

World record	Zhao Jing (CHN)	27.06	Rome, Italy	30 July 2009
Commonwealth record	Sophie Edington (AUS)	27.51	Rome, Italy	29 July 2009
Games record	Sophie Edington (AUS)	28.00	Delhi, India	8 October 2010

The following records were established during the competition:

Date	Event	Name	Nationality	Time	Record
28 July	Heat	Georgia Davies	Wales	27.90	GR
28 July	Semifinal	Emily Seebohm	Australia	27.89	GR
28 July	Semifinal	Georgia Davies	Wales	27.61	GR
29 July	Final	Georgia Davies	Wales	27.56	GR

== Results ==
=== Heats ===
Rank	Heat	Lane	Name	Nationality	Time	Notes
1	5	4	Georgia Davies	Wales	27.90	Q, GR
2	3	4	Emily Seebohm	Australia	28.03	Q
3	4	4	Lauren Quigley	England	28.39	Q
4	3	5	Kathleen Dawson	Scotland	28.56	Q
5	5	5	Madison Wilson	Australia	28.60	Q
6	4	5	Brooklynn Snodgrass	Canada	28.80	Q
7	3	3	Elizabeth Simmonds	England	29.00	Q
8	4	3	Belinda Hocking	Australia	29.01	Q
9	5	6	Tao Li	Singapore	29.11	Q
10	4	6	Hilary Caldwell	Canada	29.31	Q
11	5	3	Jessica Fullalove	England	29.43	Q
12	5	7	Lauren Hew	Cayman Islands	30.55	Q
13	5	2	Caroline Puamau	Fiji	30.73	Q
14	3	6	Danielle Hill	Northern Ireland	30.77	Q
15	3	7	Niamh Robinson	Isle of Man	31.03	Q
16	4	2	Kimiko Raheem	Sri Lanka	31.14	Q
17	2	4	Courtney Butcher	Guernsey	31.37	
18	3	2	Joyce Tafatatha	Malawi	31.90	
19	2	6	Talisa Lanoe	Kenya	31.92	
20	5	1	Cheyenne Rova	Fiji	32.26	
21	3	8	Evelina Afoa	Samoa	32.28	
22	4	8	Nadeera Jayasekera	Sri Lanka	32.31	
23	5	8	Danielle Awori	Kenya	32.41	
24	2	2	Emily Chan Chee	Mauritius	32.63	
25	2	3	Felicity Passon	Seychelles	32.74	
26	4	1	Bethany Firth	Northern Ireland	32.80	
27	1	3	Anita Field	Kenya	32.86	
28	2	5	Savannah Tkatchenko	Papua New Guinea	33.01	
29	4	7	Jade Howard	Zambia	33.10	
30	2	7	Kiran Khan	Pakistan	33.11	
31	1	5	Izzy Joachim	Saint Vincent and the Grenadines	33.52	
32	1	4	Bisma Khan	Pakistan	33.65	
33	2	8	Tegan McCarthy	Papua New Guinea	33.74	
34	2	1	Onika George	Guyana	34.64	
35	3	1	Irene Prescott	Tonga	34.66	

=== Semifinals ===
Rank	Heat	Lane	Name	Nationality	Time	Notes
1	2	4	Georgia Davies	Wales	27.61	Q, GR
2	2	5	Lauren Quigley	England	27.72	Q
3	1	4	Emily Seebohm	Australia	27.89	Q, GR
4	1	3	Brooklynn Snodgrass	Canada	28.25	Q
5	2	3	Madison Wilson	Australia	28.40	Q
6	1	5	Kathleen Dawson	Scotland	28.55	Q
7	2	6	Elizabeth Simmonds	England	28.63	Q
8	1	6	Belinda Hocking	Australia	28.87	Q
9	2	2	Tao Li	Singapore	29.13	
10	1	2	Hilary Caldwell	Canada	29.37	
11	2	7	Jessica Fullalove	England	29.42	
12	2	1	Caroline Puamau	Fiji	30.46	
13	1	1	Danielle Hill	Northern Ireland	30.87	
14	1	7	Lauren Hew	Cayman Islands	31.08	
15	1	8	Kimiko Raheem	Sri Lanka	31.11	
16	2	8	Niamh Robinson	Isle of Man	31.30	

=== Final ===
Rank	Lane	Name	Nationality	Time	Notes
1st place, gold medalist(s)	4	Georgia Davies	Wales	27.56	GR
2nd place, silver medalist(s)	5	Lauren Quigley	England	27.69	
3rd place, bronze medalist(s)	6	Brooklynn Snodgrass	Canada	27.97	
4	3	Emily Seebohm	Australia	27.98	
5	7	Kathleen Dawson	Scotland	28.47	
6	1	Elizabeth Simmonds	England	28.54	
7	8	Belinda Hocking	Australia	28.58	
8	2	Madison Wilson	Australia	28.86	
