= Nan Mulholland =

Scottish international lawn bowler

Personal information
- Nationality: British (Scottish)

Sport
- Sport: Lawn and indoor bowls
- Club: Glengarnock BC
Medal record
Representing Scotland
Scottish Nationals
Gold medal – first place	1996	Singles

Nan Mulholland is a former international lawn bowler from Scotland who competed at the Commonwealth Games.

== Biography ==
Mulholland was a member of the Glengarnock Bowls Club and represented Scotland at international level. She was the 1983 West of Scotland champion.

Mulholland represented the Scottish team at the 1986 Commonwealth Games in Edinburgh, Scotland, where she competed in the pairs event, with Greta Boyle.

In 1989 she retired form international duty but in 1996 she was the champion of Scotland in the singles at the Scottish National Bowls Championships and subsequently qualified to represent Scotland at the British Isles Bowls Championships.
