= Cayman Islands at the 2018 Commonwealth Games =

- Flag of the Cayman Islands
- CG code: CAY
- CGA: Cayman Islands Olympic Committee
- Website: caymanolympic.org.ky

in Gold Coast, Australia 4 April 2018 – 15 April 2018
- Competitors: 21 in 7 sports
- Flag bearer: Carl Morgan (opening)
- Medals: Gold 0 Silver 0 Bronze 0 Total 0

Commonwealth Games appearances (overview)
- 1978; 1982; 1986; 1990; 1994; 1998; 2002; 2006; 2010; 2014; 2018; 2022; 2026; 2030

The Cayman Islands competed at the 2018 Commonwealth Games in the Gold Coast, Australia from April 4 to April 15, 2018. The Cayman Islands announced a team of 22 athletes. However, Jamal Walton did not compete. It was The Cayman Islands' 11th appearance at the Commonwealth Games.

Long jumper Carl Morgan was the country's flag bearer during the opening ceremony.

== Competitors ==
The following is the list of number of Cayman Islands competitors participating at the Games per sport/discipline.

Sport	Men	Women	Total
Athletics	4	0	4
Boxing	1	1	2
Cycling	1	0	1
Gymnastics	0	2	2
Shooting	1	0	1
Squash	3	4	7
Swimming	2	2	4
Total	12	9	21

== Athletics ==
The Cayman Islands announced a team of 4 male athletes.

Men
Track & road events

Athlete	Event	Heat		Semifinal		Final	
Athlete	Event	Result	Rank	Result	Rank	Result	Rank
Kemar Hyman	100 m	10.24	1 Q	10.10	1 Q	10.21	5
Ronald Forbes	110 m hurdles	13.88	6	—N/a		did not advance	

Field events

Athlete	Event	Qualification		Final	
Athlete	Event	Distance	Rank	Distance	Rank
Carl Morgan	Long jump	NM		did not advance	
Alex Pascal	Javelin throw	66.66	18	did not advance	

== Boxing ==
The Cayman Islands announced a team of 2 athletes (1 man, 1 woman) that competed at the 2018 Commonwealth Games.

Athlete	Event	Round of 32	Round of 16	Quarterfinals	Semifinals	Final	Rank
Athlete	Event	Opposition Result	Opposition Result	Opposition Result	Opposition Result	Opposition Result	Rank
Dariel Ebanks	Men's −75 kg	Don Vilitama (NIU); W W/O	Benjamin Whittaker (ENG); L 0–5	did not advance			
Brandy Barnes	Women's −48 kg	—N/a	Anusha Koddithuwakku (SRI); L RSC	did not advance			

== Cycling ==
The Cayman Islands announced a team of 1 athlete (1 man) that competed at the 2018 Commonwealth Games.

=== Road ===
Men

Athlete	Event	Time	Rank
Michael Testori	Road race	DNF	

== Gymnastics ==
The Cayman Islands announced a team of 2 athletes (2 women) that competed at the 2018 Commonwealth Games.

=== Artistic ===
Women
Individual Qualification

Athlete	Event	Apparatus				Total	Rank
Athlete	Event	V	UB	BB	F	Total	Rank
Samantha Peene	Qualification	9.500	8.950	4.950	8.975	32.375	33
Raegan Rutty	Qualification	11.600	7.350	7.300	10.100	36.350	30

== Shooting ==
The Cayman Islands announced a team of 1 athlete (1 man) that competed at the 2018 Commonwealth Games.

Athlete	Event	Qualification		Final	
Athlete	Event	Points	Rank	Points	Rank
Christopher Jackson	Men's Trap	115	9	did not advance	

== Squash ==
The Cayman Islands announced a team of 7 athletes (3 men, 4 women) that competed at the 2018 Commonwealth Games.

Individual

Athlete	Event	Round of 64	Round of 32	Round of 16	Quarterfinals	Semifinals	Final	
Athlete	Event	Opposition Score	Opposition Score	Opposition Score	Opposition Score	Opposition Score	Opposition Score	Rank
Jacob Kelly	Men's singles	Williams (NZL); L 0 - 3	did not advance					
Cameron Stafford	Men's singles	Pal Sandhu (IND); L 1 - 3	did not advance					
Eilidh Bridgeman	Women's singles	Bye	Saxby (AUS); L 0 - 3	did not advance				
Samantha Hennings	Women's singles	Santana (MLT); L 0 - 3	did not advance					
Caroline Laing	Women's singles	Haywood (BAR); L 2 - 3	did not advance					

Doubles

Athlete	Event	Group stage				Round of 16	Quarterfinals	Semifinals	Final	
Athlete	Event	Opposition Score	Opposition Score	Opposition Score	Rank	Opposition Score	Opposition Score	Opposition Score	Opposition Score	Rank
Alexander Frazer; Jacob Kelly	Men's doubles	Alexander / Palmer (AUS); L 0 - 2	Binnie / Walters (JAM); L 0 - 2	—N/a	3	did not advance				
Eilidh Bridgeman; Caroline Laing	Women's doubles	Massaro / Perry (ENG); L 0 - 2	Aitken / Thomson (SCO); L 0 - 2	Duncalf / Waters (ENG); L 0 - 2	4	—N/a	did not advance			
Samantha Hennings; Marlene West	Women's doubles	Grinham / Urquhart (AUS); L 0 - 2	Fernandes / Fung-A-Fat (GUY); W 2 - 0	Cornett / Todd (CAN); L 0 - 2	3	—N/a	did not advance			
Marlene West; Cameron Stafford	Mixed doubles	Rell / Nimji (KEN); W 2 - 0	Evans / Creed (WAL); L 0 - 2	—N/a	2 Q	Urquhart / Pilley (AUS); L 0 - 2	did not advance			
Caroline Laing; Jacob Kelly	Mixed doubles	Aitken / Moran (SCO); L 0 - 2	Chinappa / Pal Sandhu (IND); L 0 - 2	—N/a	3	did not advance				

== Swimming ==
The Cayman Islands announced a team of 4 athletes (2 men, 2 women) that competed at the 2018 Commonwealth Games.

Men

Athlete	Event	Heat		Semifinal		Final	
Athlete	Event	Time	Rank	Time	Rank	Time	Rank
David Ebanks	50 m breaststroke	30.04	21	did not advance			
David Ebanks	100 m breaststroke	1:09.55	26	did not advance			
Iain McCallum	100 m freestyle	54.56	43	did not advance			
Iain McCallum	50 m butterfly	25.99	32	did not advance			
Iain McCallum	100 m butterfly	58.08	22	did not advance			

Women

Athlete	Event	Heat		Semifinal		Final	
Athlete	Event	Time	Rank	Time	Rank	Time	Rank
Lauren Hew	50 m freestyle	26.59	15 Q	26.61	15	did not advance	
Lauren Hew	100 m freestyle	58.79	20	did not advance			
Lauren Hew	200 m freestyle	2:07.21	16	—N/a		did not advance	
Lauren Hew	50 m backstroke	31.35	26	did not advance			
Lauren Hew	100 m backstroke	1:06.41	22	did not advance			
Lauren Hew	200 m backstroke	2:27.88	15	—N/a		did not advance	
Lauren Hew	50 m butterfly	29.38	20	did not advance			
Alison Jackson	50 m freestyle	27.34	21	did not advance			
Alison Jackson	100 m freestyle	59.54	22	did not advance			
Alison Jackson	200 m freestyle	2:12.08	18	—N/a		did not advance	
Alison Jackson	400 m freestyle	4:42.01	19	—N/a		did not advance	

== See also ==
- Cayman Islands at the 2018 Summer Youth Olympics
