= Kristina O'Hara =

Irish boxer (born 1996)

Personal information
- Born: 8 April 1996 (age 30) Belfast, Northern Ireland
- Height: 163 cm (5 ft 4 in)
- Weight: light flyweight

Boxing career
- Stance: Orthodox

Boxing record
- Total fights: 106 amateur
- Wins: 105
- Win by KO: 65
- Losses: 1
- No contests: 0
Medal record
Representing Northern Ireland
Commonwealth Games
Silver medal – second place	2018 Gold Coast	light flyweight

Kristina O'Hara (born 8 April 1996) is a boxer from Belfast.

== Early life ==
O'Hara attended St Louise's Comprehensive College in Belfast.

== Career ==
O'Hara first attended Emerald Boxing Club in Lenadoon.

O'Hara boxes with St John Bosco BC in west Belfast.

She won gold at the European Union Junior Championships in Hungary in 2013 and followed it with silver at the European Youths in Italy a year later.

A light flyweight, she won silver at the 2018 Commonwealth Games.
