= Stella Oliver =

Welsh international lawn bowler

Personal information
- Nationality: British (Welsh)

Sport
- Sport: Lawn and indoor bowls
- Club: Stradey BC, Llanelli; Llanelli IBC

Stella Oliver is a former international lawn bowler from Wales who competed at the Commonwealth Games.

== Biography ==
Oliver was a member of the Stradey Bowls Club in Llanelli and the Llanelli Indoor Bowls Club. She won the Welsh indoor pairs and British Isles Indoors pairs in 1985 and 1987 respectively and represented Wales at international level.

Oliver represented the Welsh team at the 1990 Commonwealth Games in Auckland, New Zealand, where she competed in the fours event, with Ann Dainton, Rita Jones and Linda Evans.
