= Malcolm Graham (bowls) =

Scottish international lawn bowler

Personal information
- Nationality: British (Scottish)

Sport
- Sport: Lawn and indoor bowls
- Club: Linlithgow BC

Malcolm Graham is a former international lawn bowler from Scotland who competed at the Commonwealth Games.

== Biography ==
Graham was a member of the Linlithgow Bowls Club and won the 1981 National Junior singles. He represented Scotland at international level.

Graham represented the Scottish team at the 1986 Commonwealth Games in Edinburgh, Scotland, where he competed in the fours event, with Jim Boyle, Graham Robertson and Willie Harkness, finishing in sixth place.

In 1987 Graham was dating fellow international bowler Elizabeth Ann.
