= Cayman Islands at the 1986 Commonwealth Games =

- CGF code: CAY

in Edinburgh, Scotland
- Medals: Gold 0 Silver 0 Bronze 0 Total 0

Commonwealth Games appearances (overview)
- 1978; 1982; 1986; 1990; 1994; 1998; 2002; 2006; 2010; 2014; 2018; 2022; 2026; 2030

Cayman Islands competed in the 1986 Commonwealth Games in Edinburgh between 24 July–2 August. Cayman Islands did not win any medals at the games.

== Boxing ==
Men

Athlete	Event	Quarterfinals	Semifinals	Final	
Athlete	Event	Opposition Result	Opposition Result	Opposition Result	Rank
Sterling Ebanks	Welterweight (67kg)	James McAllister (SCO) L	did not advance		
Noel Thomas	Light heavyweight (81kg)	Harry Lawson (SCO) L	did not advance		

== Cycling ==
Men

Athlete	Event	Heat		Quarterfinal		Semifinal		Final/Bronze Medal Match	
Athlete	Event	Time/ Score	Rank	Time/ Score	Rank	Time/ Score	Rank	Time/ Score	Rank
Aldyn Wint	Time trial	—						1:20.33	26
Cayman Islands	Team time trial	—						2:52.53	11
