= Linda Evans (bowls) =

Welsh international lawn bowler

Personal information
- Nationality: British (Welsh)

Sport
- Sport: Lawn and indoor bowls
- Club: Port Talbot BC
Medal record
Representing Wales
World Outdoor Championships
| Bronze medal – third place | 2004 Leamington Spa | fours |
| Bronze medal – third place | 2004 Leamington Spa | team |
Commonwealth Games
| Gold medal – first place | 1986 Edinburgh | fours |
Atlantic Bowls Championships
| Silver medal – second place | 1993 Florida | fours |
British Isles Championships
| Gold medal – first place | 1993 | pairs |
| Gold medal – first place | 2011 | triples |

Linda Evans is a former international lawn and indoor bowler from Wales who competed at the Commonwealth Games.

== Biography ==
Evans was part of the fours team that won the gold medal at the 1986 Commonwealth Games in Edinburgh and also won a bronze medal in the fours at the 2004 World Outdoor Bowls Championship in Leamington Spa.

Evans represented the Welsh team at the 1990 Commonwealth Games in Auckland, New Zealand, where she competed in the fours event, with Ann Dainton, Rita Jones and Stella Oliver.

In 1993, she won the fours silver medal at the inaugural Atlantic Bowls Championships.

She was selected as one of the Welsh coaches at the 2010 Commonwealth Games and is a representative of the Welsh Bowls Federation.
