= Wales at the 1990 Commonwealth Games =

- CG code: WAL
- CGA: Wales at the Commonwealth Games
- Website: teamwales.cymru

in Auckland, New Zealand
- Medals Ranked 6th: Gold 10 Silver 3 Bronze 12 Total 25

Commonwealth Games appearances (overview)
- 1930; 1934; 1938; 1950; 1954; 1958; 1962; 1966; 1970; 1974; 1978; 1982; 1986; 1990; 1994; 1998; 2002; 2006; 2010; 2014; 2018; 2022; 2026; 2030

Wales competed at the 1990 Commonwealth Games in Auckland, New Zealand, from 24 January – 3 February 1990.

Wales came 6th overall with 10 gold, 3 silver and 12 bronze medals. However, the medal count was somewhat inflated by 12 weightlifting medals won by 6 competitors because of the new system of awarding three medals per weight, in the snatch, clean and jerk and the overall lifts.

== Medallists ==
=== Gold ===
- Andrew Davies (weightlifting - overall)
- Andrew Davies (weightlifting - snatch)
- Andrew Davies (weightlifting - c&j)
- Colin Jackson (athletics)
- Louise Jones (cycling)
- Bob Morgan (diving)
- Dave Morgan (weightlifting - overall)
- Dave Morgan (weightlifting - snatch)
- Dave Morgan (weightlifting - c&j)
- Kay Morley (athletics)

=== Silver ===
- Helen Duston (judo)
- Karl Jones (weightlifting)
- Men's trap pairs (shooting

=== Bronze ===
- Aled Arnold (weightlifting - snatch)
- Aled Arnold (weightlifting - c&j)
- James Charles (judo)
- Paul Edwards (athletics)
- Lisa Griffiths (judo)
- Ian Hamer (athletics)
- Michael Jay (shooting
- Phillipa Knowles (judo)
- Mark Roach (weightlifting - overall)
- Mark Roach (weightlifting - c&j)
- Moira Sutton (judo)
- Steve Wilson (weightlifting)

== Team ==
=== Athletics ===
Men

Athlete	Events	Club	Medals
Nigel Bevan	javelin throw		
Steve Brace	marathon		
Paul Edwards	shot put		Bronze medal
Roger Hackney	5000m 3000m steeplechase		
Ian Hamer	1500m, 5000m		Bronze medal
Neil Horsfield	800m, 1500m		
Colin Jackson	110m hurdles		Gold medal
Steve Jones	10,000m, marathon		
Nigel Walker	110m hurdles		

Women

Athlete	Events	Club	Medals
Kay Morley	100m hurdles		Gold medal
Sallyanne Short	100m, 200m		
Carmen Smart	100m		
Angela Tooby	10,000m		
Caroline Helen White	javelin throw		

=== Badminton ===
Men

Athlete	Events	Club	Medals
Chris Rees	singles, mixed	Penarth Badminton Club	

Women

Athlete	Events	Club	Medals
Sarah Williams	singles, mixed	Penarth Badminton Club	

=== Boxing ===
Athlete	Events	Club	Medals
Jason Matthews	60 kg lightweight	Aberbargoed ABC	
Kevin McCormack	+91 kg heavyweight	Coed Eva ABC, Cwmbran	
Michael Smyth	63.5 kg light-welterweight	Rhoose ABC	
John Williams	57 kg featherweight	Pontypool and Panteg ABC	

=== Cycling ===
Men

Athlete	Events	Club	Medals
John Evans	road race, team time trial		
Norman Hughes	road race, team time trial		
Richard Hughes	road race, team time trial, scratch, pursuit, points		
Steve Paulding	scratch, sprint, 1 km time trial		
Matt Postle	road race, team time trial		

Women

Athlete	Events	Club	Medals
Clare Greenwood	road race, pursuit		
Louise Jones	road race, sprint		Gold medal
Sally McKenzie	road race, pursuit		

=== Diving ===
Men

Athlete	Events	Club	Medals
Bob Morgan	1m, 3m springboard, platform		Gold medal

Women

Athlete	Events	Club	Medals
Olivia Clark	1m, 3m springboard, platform		

=== Gymnastics ===
Men

Athlete	Events	Medals
David Buffin	parallel bars, team	
David Griffiths	all-around, rings, team	
Andrew Morris	all-around, floor, horizontal, parallel, pommel, vault, team	
Peter Sloman	all-around, team	

Women

Athlete	Events	Medals
Katherine Bennion	all-around, team	
Rachel Breese	all-around, team	
Cerian Nicholson	team	
Helen Richards	all-around, vault, team	

=== Judo ===
Men

Athlete	Events	Club	Medals
James Charles	60 kg extra-lightweight	Ren-Bu-Kai JC, Newport	Bronze medal
Daniel Davies	78 kg half-middleweight	Llanelli	
Andrew Jenkins	71 kg lightweight	Afan Lido JC, Port Talbot	
Dafydd Thomas	65 kg half-lightweight	Swansea	
Simon Woods	86 kg middleweight	Deeside	

Women

Athlete	Events	Club	Medals
Helen Duston	48 kg extra-lightweight	Sanshirokwai JC, Llanelli	Silver medal
Lisa Griffiths	52 kg half-lightweight	Sanshirokwai JC, Llanelli	Bronze medal
Phillipa Knowles	72 kg half-heavyweight	St Andrews JC, Newport	Bronze medal
Moira Sutton	56 kg lightweight	Newport	Bronze medal

=== Lawn bowls ===
Men

Athlete	Events	Club	Medals
Alan Beer	fours	Aberavon BC	
Trevor Mounty	fours	Abertridwr BC	
John Price	singles	Aberavon BC	
Will Thomas	pairs	Pontrhydyfen BC	
David Vowles	fours	Dinas Powys BC	
Robert Weale	pairs	Presteigne BC	
Dai Wilkins	fours	Pontrhydyfen BC	

Women

Athlete	Events	Club	Medals
Janet Ackland	singles	Penarth Belle Vue BC	
Ann Dainton	fours	Barry Plastics BC	
Linda Evans	fours	Port Talbot BC	
Pam Griffiths	pairs	Merthyr West End BC	
Mary Hughes	pairs	Skewen BC	
Rita Jones	fours	Gilfach Bargoed BC	
Stella Oliver	fours	Stradey BC	

=== Shooting ===
Athlete	Events	Medals
James Birkett-Evans	trap, pair	Silver medal
John Dallimore	free rifle-prone, pair	
Desmond Davies	skeet, pair	
Colin D. Evans	trap, pair	Silver medal
Christopher Hockley	fullbore rifle, pair	
Michael Jay	centre fire pistol, pair, rapid fire pistol	Bronze medal
Antony Lewis	skeet, pair	
Dion O'Leary	fullbore rifle, pair	
Stephen Pengelly	centre fire pistol, pair, rapid fire pair	
Terence Wakefield	free rifle-prone, pair	

=== Swimming ===
Men

Athlete	Events	Club	Medals
Richard Brown	100, 200m breaststroke, medley relay		
Tony Day	400, 1500m free, 400 medley		
David Jones	100 butterflly, 50, 100m free, medley relay		
Ian Rosser	100, 200m backstroke, 400 medley, medley relay		
Michael Watkins	100, 200 butterfly, 200 free, 200 medley, medley relay		

Women

Athlete	Events	Club	Medals
Joanne Evans	100, 200m backstroke		
Julia Henwood	100, 200m breaststroke		
Deborah Jones	100, 200, 400, 800m free		
Maxine Lock	100m butterfly, 50m, 100m free		
Helen Mansfield	100, 200m free, 200 medley		

=== Weightlifting ===
Athlete	Events	Medals
Aled Arnold	110 kg heavyweight	,
Jeffrey Bryce	60 kg featherweight	
Ricky Chaplin	75 kg middleweight	
Andrew Davies	+110 kg super-heavyweight	,,
Gareth Hives	100 kg heavyweight	
Karl Jones	75 kg middleweight	Silver medal
Dave Morgan	82.5 kg light-heavyweight	,,
Mark Roach	67.5 kg lightweight	,
Raymond Williams	67.5 kg lightweight	
Steven Wilson	110 kg heavyweight	Bronze medal
