= Cayman Islands at the 2014 Commonwealth Games =

- Flag of the Cayman Islands
- CG code: CAY
- CGA: Cayman Islands Olympic Committee
- Website: caymanolympic.org.ky

in Glasgow, Scotland
- Competitors: 28 in 7 sports
- Flag bearer: Michele Smith
- Medals: Gold 0 Silver 0 Bronze 0 Total 0

Commonwealth Games appearances (overview)
- 1978; 1982; 1986; 1990; 1994; 1998; 2002; 2006; 2010; 2014; 2018; 2022; 2026; 2030

The Cayman Islands competed in the 2014 Commonwealth Games in Glasgow, Scotland from 23 July – 3 August 2014. A team of 28 athletes in 7 sports represented the country, the largest team ever being sent by the territory.

== Athletics ==
The athletics team consists of ten athletes.

Men
Track & road events

| Athlete | Event | Heat | | Semifinal | | Final | |
| Athlete | Event | Result | Rank | Result | Rank | Result | Rank |
|---|---|---|---|---|---|---|---|
| Kemar Hyman | 100 m | 10.20 | 4 Q | 10.31 | 20 | did not advance | |
| David Hamil | 200 m | 22.02 | 57 | did not advance | | | |
| Tyrell Cuffy | 200 m | 21.75 | 46 | did not advance | | | |
| Ronald Forbes | 110 m hurdles | 13.89 | 11 | —N/a | | did not advance | |
| Tyrell Cuffy; Kemar Hyman; David Hamil; Troy Long | 4 × 100 m relay | 40.50 | 12 | —N/a | | did not advance | |

Field Events

| Athlete | Event | Qualification | | Final | |
| Athlete | Event | Distance | Rank | Distance | Rank |
|---|---|---|---|---|---|
| Carl Morgan | Long jump | 6.99 | 21 | did not advance | |
| Carlos Morgan | Long jump | 7.41 | 17 | did not advance | |

Women
Field events

| Athlete | Event | Qualification | | Final | |
| Athlete | Event | Distance | Position | Distance | Position |
|---|---|---|---|---|---|
| Elizabeth Dadzie | Long jump | 6.12 PB | 19 | did not advance | |
| Ashleigh Nalty | High jump | 1.71 | 24 | did not advance | |

Key

- Note–Ranks given for track events are within the athlete's heat only
- Q = Qualified for the next round
- q = Qualified for the next round as a fastest loser or, in field events, by position without achieving the qualifying target
- NR = National record
- N/A = Round not applicable for the event

== Boxing ==
Only one boxer was included in the final squad.

| Athlete | Event | Round of 32 | Round of 16 | Quarterfinals | Semifinals | Final | |
| Athlete | Event | Opposition Result | Opposition Result | Opposition Result | Opposition Result | Opposition Result | Rank |
|---|---|---|---|---|---|---|---|
| Tafari Ebanks | Bantamweight | Bye | Umings (PNG); W KO2 | Njangiru (KEN); L 0 - 3 | did not advance | | |

== Cycling ==
Only one cyclist was included in the final squad.

=== Road ===
Men

| Athlete | Event | Time | Rank |
|---|---|---|---|
| Michele Smith | Road race | DNF | |
| Michele Smith | Time trial | 58:49.64 | 36 |

== Gymnastics ==
Only one gymnast was included in the final squad.

=== Artistic ===
Individuals

| Athlete | Event | Qualification | | | | | | Final | | | | | |
| Athlete | Event | Apparatus | | | | Total | Rank | Apparatus | | | | Total | Rank |
| Athlete | Event | F | V | UB | BB | Total | Rank | F | V | UB | BB | Total | Rank |
|---|---|---|---|---|---|---|---|---|---|---|---|---|---|
| Bethany Dikau | Individual | 10.766 | 11.000 | 7.666 | 9.466 | 38.898 | 37 | did not advance | | | | | |

== Shooting ==
Three shooters were included in the final squad.

Men

| Athlete | Event | Qualification | | Semifinals | | Final | |
| Athlete | Event | Points | Rank | Points | Rank | Points | Rank |
|---|---|---|---|---|---|---|---|
| Christopher Jackson | Trap | 97 | 26 | did not advance | | | |
| Edison McLean | Skeet | 113 | 11 | did not advance | | | |
| Andrew Schirn | Skeet | 103 | 20 | did not advance | | | |

== Squash ==
Six squash athletes were included in the final squad.

Individual

| Athlete | Event | Round of 128 | Round of 64 | Round of 32 | Round of 16 | Quarterfinals | Semifinals | Final | Rank |
| Athlete | Event | Opposition Score | Opposition Score | Opposition Score | Opposition Score | Opposition Score | Opposition Score | Opposition Score | Rank |
|---|---|---|---|---|---|---|---|---|---|
| Julian Jervis | Men's Singles | Bye | C Simpson (GUE); L 0-3 | did not advance | | | | | |
| Daniel Murphy | Men's Singles | H Bains (KEN); L 0-3 | did not advance | | | | | | |
| Cameron Stafford | Men's Singles | Bye | C Navas (GIB); W 3-0 | A Walker (BOT); L 0-3 | did not advance | | | | |
| Eilidh Bridgeman | Women's Singles | —N/a | Bye | L Wee Wern (MAS); L 0-3 | did not advance | | | | |

Doubles

| Athlete | Event | Group Stage | | | | Round of 16 | Quarterfinal | Semifinal | Final | Rank |
| Athlete | Event | Opposition Score | Opposition Score | Opposition Score | Rank | Opposition Score | Opposition Score | Opposition Score | Opposition Score | Rank |
|---|---|---|---|---|---|---|---|---|---|---|
| Julian Jervis; Myron Blair | Men's doubles | India; L 1 - 2 | Uganda; W 2 - 0 | Wales; L 0 - 2 | 3 | did not advance | | | | |
| Cameron Stafford; Marlene West | Mixed doubles | Australia; L 1 - 2 | Zambia; W 2 - 0 | Northern Ireland; L 1 - 2 | 3 | did not advance | | | | |
| Daniel Murphy; Eilidh Bridgeman | Mixed doubles | Malaysia; L 0 - 2 | Papua New Guinea; W 2 - 1 | Scotland; L 0 - 2 | 3 | did not advance | | | | |

== Swimming ==
Six swimmers were included in the final squad.

Men

| Athlete | Event | Heat | | Semifinal | | Final | |
| Athlete | Event | Time | Rank | Time | Rank | Time | Rank |
|---|---|---|---|---|---|---|---|
| Brett Fraser | 50 m freestyle | 22.79 | 11 Q | 22.87 | 13 | did not advance | |
| Geoffrey Butler | 200 m freestyle | 1:57.13 | 25 | —N/a | | did not advance | |
| Geoffrey Butler | 400 m freestyle | 4:06.78 | 22 | —N/a | | did not advance | |
| Geoffrey Butler | 1500 m freestyle | 16:14.39 | 16 | —N/a | | did not advance | |
| Alex McCallum | 50 m backstroke | 28.27 | 25 | did not advance | | | |
| Alex McCallum | 100 m backstroke | 1:01.22 | 26 | did not advance | | | |
| Alex McCallum | 200 m backstroke | 2:13.87 | 16 | —N/a | | did not advance | |
| David Ebanks | 50 m breaststroke | 30.04 | =19 | did not advance | | | |
| David Ebanks | 100 m breaststroke | 1:08.36 | 25 | did not advance | | | |
| Brett Fraser | 50 m butterfly | 24.01 | 9 Q | 23.96 | 8 Q | 23.66 | 5 |

Women

| Athlete | Event | Heat | | Semifinal | | Final | |
| Athlete | Event | Time | Rank | Time | Rank | Time | Rank |
|---|---|---|---|---|---|---|---|
| Lauren Hew | 50 m backstroke | 30.55 | 12 Q | 31.08 | 14 | did not advance | |
| Lara Butler | 100 m backstroke | 1:08.37 | 20 | did not advance | | | |
| Lauren Hew | 100 m backstroke | 1:07.34 | 18 | did not advance | | | |
| Lauren Hew | 200 m backstroke | 2:27.16 | 15 | —N/a | | did not advance | |
| Lara Butler | 100 m butterfly | 1:05.69 | 23 | did not advance | | | |
| Lara Butler | 200 m butterfly | 2:22.53 | 20 | —N/a | | did not advance | |
| Lara Butler | 200 m individual medley | 2:27.49 | 21 | —N/a | | did not advance | |
