= Edda Bonutto =

Australian bowls player

Personal information
- Nationality: Australian
- Born: 16 February 1939
- Died: 26 June 1998 (aged 59)
Medal record
Representing Australia
Commonwealth Games
Silver medal – second place	1990 Auckland	pairs
Asia Pacific Bowls Championships
Gold medal – first place	1991 Kowloon	pairs
Bronze medal – third place	1991 Kowloon	fours

Edda Bonutto (16 February 1939 – 26 June 1998) was an Australian female international lawn bowler.

== Bowls career ==
She won a silver medal in the women's pairs with Maureen Hobbs at the 1990 Commonwealth Games in Auckland.

Four years later she competed in the singles at the 1994 Commonwealth Games in Victoria, British Columbia, Canada.

She won two medals at the 1991 Asia Pacific Bowls Championships, including a gold in the pairs with Daphne Shaw, in Kowloon, Hong Kong.
