= Jenny Wallis =

Lawn bowler from Hong Kong

Personal information
- Nationality: Hongkonger
Medal record
Representing (Hong Kong) Hong Kong
Commonwealth Games
Bronze medal – third place	1990 Auckland	fours
Asia Pacific Bowls Championships
Bronze medal – third place	1993 Victoria	triples
Silver medal – second place	1993 Victoria	fours

Jenny Wallis is a former Hong Kong international lawn bowler.

== Bowls career ==
She won a bronze medal in the fours at the 1990 Commonwealth Games in Auckland, with Naty Rozario, Angela Chau and Yee Lai Lee. In addition she competed in the fours at the 1994 Commonwealth Games.

She won a fours silver medal and a triples bronze medal at the 1993 Asia Pacific Bowls Championships in Victoria, Canada.

== Personal life ==
She married Ken Wallis and they moved to Australia when she was appointed director of the Hong Kong Economic & Trade Office in Sydney.
