= David Vowles =

Welsh international lawn bowler

Personal information
- Nationality: British (Welsh)
- Born: born c.1960

Sport
- Sport: Lawn and indoor bowls
- Club: Barry Central BC; Dinas Powys BC

David Vowles (born c.1960) is a former international lawn bowler from Wales who competed at the Commonwealth Games.

== Biography ==
Vowles was a member of the Barry Central Bowls Club and in 1978 won the club novices trophy before winning the Welsh U23 title in 1982.

He represented Wales at the 1988 World Bowls Championship and in 1989, he left Barry Central to play for Dinas Powys Bowls Club.

Vowles, a civil servant by profession, lived on Cora Street in Barry and represented the Welsh team at the 1990 Commonwealth Games in Auckland, New Zealand, where he competed in the fours event, with Alan Beer, Trevor Mounty and Dai Wilkins.
