= Lyn McLean =

NZ international lawn bowler (1944–2017)

Personal information
- Born: 1944 or 1945
- Died: 6 May 2017 (aged 72) Foxton Beach, New Zealand

Sport
- Country: New Zealand
- Sport: Lawn bowls
- Club: Foxton and Beach Bowling Club; Manawatu Bowling Club
Medal record
Women's bowls
Representing New Zealand
Commonwealth Games
Silver medal – second place	1990 Auckland	Fours
Asia Pacific Bowls Championships
Gold medal – first place	1989 Suva	Fours
Silver medal – second place	1989 Suva	Pairs

Lynette Zoe McLean (1944 or 1945 – 6 May 2017) was an international lawn bowler from New Zealand.

== Biography ==
McLean was educated at Freyberg High School and started bowling in 1975 at Northern Bowling Club.

She won two medals at the Asia Pacific Bowls Championships including a gold medal in the 1989 fours, in Suva, Fiji.

She won a silver medal in the women's fours with Adrienne Lambert, Marlene Castle and Rhoda Ryan at the 1990 Commonwealth Games in Auckland.

She died at her home in Foxton Beach on 6 May 2017, aged 72, following a heart attack.
