= Wang Menghan =

- 王梦菡
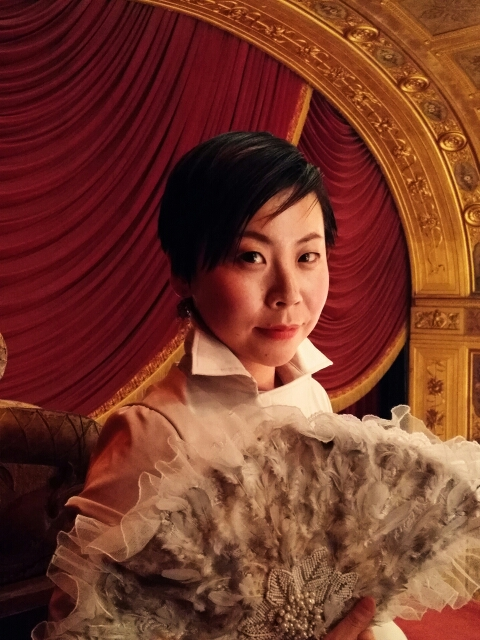
- Wang Menghan
- Born: Harbin, Heilongjiang, China
- Writing career
- Pen name: Tau Tau
- Language: Chinese, English, Italian, German

Wang Menghan (Chinese: 王梦菡), also known as Tau Tau (Chinese: 中国桃), is an author and filmmaker. She was born in Harbin and grew up in Shanghai. She lived in North Africa for many years and now lives in Berlin.

== Introduction ==
At the age of 16, she published her first novel, The Ivory Fairytale (Chinese: 象牙童话), based on her life in Shanghai No. 3 girls’ high school. This book was later adapted for the screen and won the national award of Chinese Central Ministry of Culture for TV film and radio drama script. She wrote columns for periodicals such as Der Bund and Shanghai Times. In 2005, she published collections of column articles, Qing Ren Di Tu (Chinese: 情人地图) and Ye Ren Bu Luo (Chinese: 野人部落). Her novel Foxy (Chinese: 狐香) was published in 2008, and Shake Shake, North Africa (Chinese: 北非，摇摇摇) in 2011.

In 2015 she wrote and directed the short film Angry Fruits Hotel. In 2016, she produced the Germany-China co-production feature film Open Wound, which won 21 international film awards including a best producer award in 2017 at Hollywood International Moving Pictures Film Festiva. Her feature debut movie NO ZUO NO DIE, written and directed by herself, started filming in Hessen, Germany.
