= Lauren Quigley =

English swimmer (born 1995)

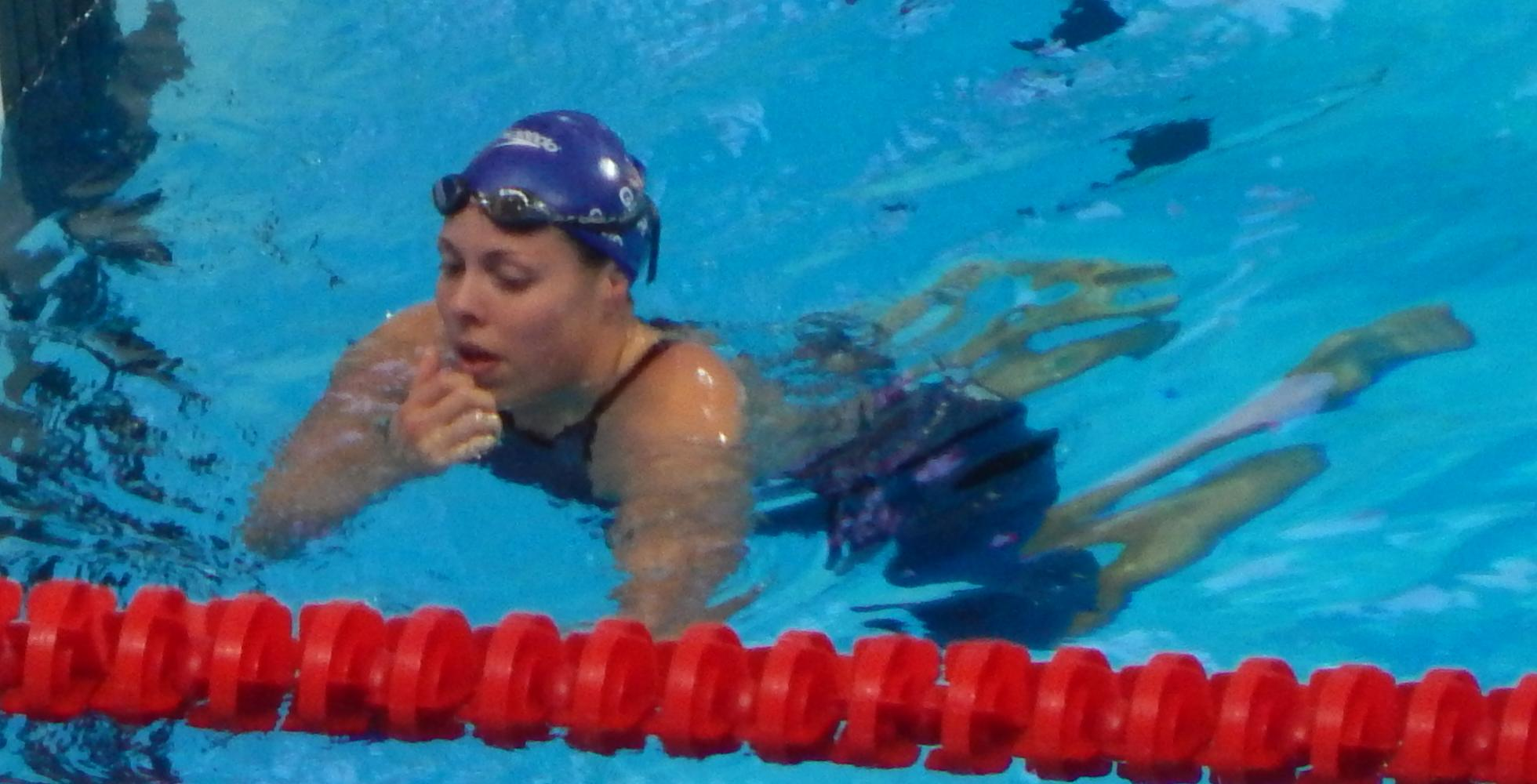

Personal information
- Full name: Lauren Alice Quigley
- National team: Great Britain
- Born: 28 February 1995 (age 31) Stockport, England

Sport
- Sport: Swimming
- Strokes: Backstroke
Medal record
Women's swimming
Representing England
Commonwealth Games
Silver medal – second place	2014 Glasgow	50 m backstroke
Silver medal – second place	2014 Glasgow	4x100 m freestyle
Silver medal – second place	2014 Glasgow	4x100 m medley

Lauren Alice Quigley (born 28 February 1995) is an English competitive swimmer who has represented Great Britain at the FINA world championships and England in the Commonwealth Games. She competed primarily in backstroke and freestyle events. At the 2014 Commonwealth Games in Glasgow, she won three silver medals: 50-metre backstroke, 4x100-metre freestyle relay, and 4x100-metre medley relay.
