= Ann Dainton =

Welsh lawn bowler

Personal information
- Nationality: British (Welsh)
- Born: 8 May 1940 (age 86)

Sport
- Sport: Lawn and indoor bowls
- Club: Cardiff & Vale of Glamorgan
Medal record
Representing Wales
Commonwealth Games
Bronze medal – third place	1994 Victoria	Women's pairs

Ann Dainton (born 8 May 1940) is a Welsh former international lawn and indoor bowler.

== Biography ==
Dainton competed in the singles at the 1986 Commonwealth Games in Edinburgh, Scotland and four years later represented the Welsh team at the 1990 Commonwealth Games in Auckland, New Zealand, where she competed in the fours event, with Rita Jones, Stella Oliver and Linda Evans.

Four years later she won a bronze medal at her third Commonwealth Games at the 1994 Commonwealth Games in the pairs event with Janet Ackland.

She is a nine times national indoor champion (singles 1982, 1983 1985), (triples 1984, 1986, 1992, 2000) and (fours 1980, 2006).
