= Brooklynn Snodgrass =

Canadian swimmer

Brooklyn Snodrass
Personal information
- Nationality: Canada
- Born: April 19, 1994 (age 32) Estevan, Saskatchewan
- Height: 1.83 m (6 ft 0 in)
- Weight: 71 kg (157 lb; 11.2 st)

Sport
- Sport: Swimming
- Strokes: Backstroke, IM
Medal record
Pan Pacific Championships
Bronze medal – third place	2014 Gold Coast	4×100 m medley
Commonwealth Games
Bronze medal – third place	2014 Glasgow	50 m backstroke

Brooklynn Snodgrass (born April 19, 1994) is a swimmer competing for Canada. She won a bronze medal in the 50 m at the 2014 Commonwealth Games in Glasgow.
