= Jim Boyle (bowls) =

Scottish international lawn bowler

Personal information
- Nationality: Scottish
- Born: 1935
- Died: 11 October 2015 (aged 79–80)

Sport
- Sport: Lawn and indoor bowls
- Club: Whitburn BC
Medal record
Representing Scotland
World Outdoor Championships
Silver medal – second place	1984 Aberdeen	triples
Bronze medal – third place	1984 Aberdeen	fours
Gold medal – first place	1984 Aberdeen	team

Jim Boyle (1935 – 11 October 2015) was a Scottish international lawn and indoor bowls player.

== Biography ==
Boyle won a silver medal in the triples and a bronze medal in the fours at the 1984 World Outdoor Bowls Championship in Aberdeen.

He made his Scottish international debut indoors in 1971 and outdoors in 1972.

He competed at the 1986 Commonwealth Games in the men's fours event, with Graham Robertson, Willie Harkness and Malcolm Graham, finishing in sixth place.
