= Rhoda Ryan =

New Zealand lawn bowler

Personal information
- Born: Rhoda Constance Hawke; 4 January 1925
- Died: 22 April 2002 (aged 77) Matamata, New Zealand

Sport
- Country: New Zealand
- Sport: Lawn bowls
- Club: Stratford BC; Matamata Bowling Club
Medal record
Representing New Zealand
World Outdoor Championships
Bronze medal – third place	1985 Melbourne	singles
Bronze medal – third place	1985 Melbourne	team
Commonwealth Games
Silver medal – second place	1990 Auckland	pairs
Asia Pacific Bowls Championships
Gold medal – first place	1985 Tweed Heads	pairs
Silver medal – second place	1985 Tweed Heads	singles

Rhoda Constance Ryan (née Hawke; 4 January 1925 – 22 April 2002) was an international lawn bowls competitor for New Zealand.

== Bowls career ==
Ryan won the singles bronze medal at the 1985 World Outdoor Bowls Championship in Melbourne, Australia. In 1990 she represented New Zealand at the Commonwealth Games and won a silver medal in the fours with Adrienne Lambert, Lyn McLean and Marlene Castle.

She won two medals at the Asia Pacific Bowls Championships including a gold medal in the 1985 pairs at Tweed Heads, New South Wales.

Ryan won the 1980 singles, the 1973 & 1988 pairs and the 1981, 1989, 1990, 1991 and 1994 fours titles at the New Zealand National Bowls Championships when bowling mainly for the Matamata Bowls Club and over 50 club titles.

The eight times National Champion died in April 2002.
