= George McCallum (sprinter) =

Scottish athlete

Personal information
- Born: 30 January 1963 (age 63) Stirling, Scotland

Sport
- Sport: Athletics
- Event: Sprinting
Medal record
Representing Scotland
Commonwealth Games
Bronze medal – third place	1986 Edinburgh	4x100 m relay

George McCallum (born 30 January 1963) is a Scottish former athlete who competed in sprinting events.

McCallum, the son of a former Third Lanark footballer, was born and raised in Stirling. In 1984 he achieved the 100 metre and 200 metre double at the Scottish championships. He won the Scottish 200 metres title again in 1986, to earn a place on Scotland's Commonwealth Games team. At the Commonwealth Games he narrowly missed a place in the 200 metres final with a ninth placing but ran on the bronze medal-winning 4 × 100 m relay team.

A graduate of Heriot-Watt University, McCallum works in the finance industry.
