= Richard Leishman =

British swimmer

Personal information
- Born: 17 October 1969 (age 56) Halifax, England

Sport
- Sport: Swimming

Richard Leishman (born 17 October 1969) is a British swimmer.

He competed in two events at the 1992 Summer Olympics and competed for Scotland at the 1986 Commonwealth Games.
