= Paul Brew =

British swimmer

Personal information
- Born: 20 November 1965 (age 60) Portsmouth, England

Sport
- Sport: Swimming

Paul Brew (born 20 November 1965) is a male retired swimmer who competed for Great Britain and Scotland.

== Swimming career ==
Brew competed in the men's 400 metre individual medley at the 1988 Summer Olympics. He represented Scotland at the 1986 Commonwealth Games in Edinburgh, Scotland and at the 1990 Commonwealth Games in Auckland, New Zealand. At the ASA National British Championships he won the 200 metres medley title in 1984 and 1986 and the 400 metres medley title in 1989.

== Personal life ==
His brother Robin Brew is also a former international swimmer. His daughter Chloe Brew competed in the Olympic Games for Great Britain in rowing in 2020.
