= Gerrard Keating =

Australian sprinter (born 1962)

Gerrard Keating (born 3 December 1962) is a former Australian 100 metre sprinter.

Originally from Ballarat, Victoria, he was a champion junior sprinter and won the Australian 100 metre championship in 1986. In 1981 he competed at the Pacific Conference Games where he finished 4th in the 100 metres, and took the silver with the Australian sprint relay team in the 4 × 100 m. He then competed for Oceania at the 1981 World Cup in the 100 metres where he finished 7th, and then 8th in the relay. In 1982 he competed at the Commonwealth Games in Brisbane where he finished 9th in the 100 metre final, and 4th in the sprint relay final. He went on to compete at the 1983 World Championships in Helsinki where he got as far as the 2nd round in the 100 metres and relay before he was eliminated. In 1985 he competed again at the World Cup 100 metres finishing in 5th, and again with the relay that finished 6th. In 1986 he competed at the Commonwealth Games where he reached the 100 metre final and finished 7th.

After retiring from running, Keating became an athletics coach, coaching 2007 Stawell Gift winner Nathan Allan and 2009 favourite, Chris Hickey.

Keating's PB for the 100m is 10.22, the former Australian National record, run at the 1985 World Cup in Canberra, Australia, on 4 October.
