= Ruth Gilfillan =

British swimmer

Personal information
- Born: 6 March 1967 (age 59) Glasgow, Scotland

Sport
- Sport: Swimming
Medal record
Representing Scotland
Commonwealth Games
Bronze medal – third place	1986 Edinburgh	200 metre freestyle

Ruth Gilfillan (born 6 March 1967) is a British swimmer. Gilfillan competed in two events at the 1988 Summer Olympics. She won the 1987 and 1991 ASA National Championship 200 metres freestyle titles and the 1987, 1988 and 1991 ASA National Championship 400 metres freestyle titles. She competed for Scotland at the 1986 Commonwealth Games where she won a bronze medal in the 200 metre freestyle.
