= Jean Hill (swimmer) =

British swimmer

Personal information
- Born: 15 July 1964 (age 62) Larkhall, Scotland

Sport
- Sport: Swimming
- Club: Larkhall Avondale SC; Cumbernauld Amateur SC
Medal record
Representing Scotland
Commonwealth Games
Silver medal – second place	1986 Edinburgh	200m Individual Medley
Silver medal – second place	1986 Edinburgh	100m Breaststroke

Jean Cameron Hill (born 15 July 1964) is a British swimmer. Hill competed at the 1984 Summer Olympics and the 1988 Summer Olympics. At the ASA National British Championships she won the 200 metres breaststroke title in 1991. She represented Scotland at the 1986 Commonwealth Games where she won silver medals in the 200m Individual Medley and 100m Breaststroke events.
