= Sunday Maweni =

Botswana sprinter

Personal information
- Nationality: Botswana
- Born: 1 January 1959 (age 67)

Sport
- Sport: Sprinting
- Event: 400 metres

Sunday Maweni (born 1 January 1959) is a Botswana sprinter. He competed in the men's 400 metres at the 1988 Summer Olympics.
