= Linda Donnelly =

British swimmer

Personal information
- Born: 21 October 1969 (age 56) Bellshill, North Lanarkshire

Sport
- Sport: Swimming

Linda Donnelly (born 21 October 1969) is a British swimmer. She competed in the women's 4 × 100 metre freestyle relay at the 1988 Summer Olympics.

She competed for Scotland at the 1986 Commonwealth Games where she competed in the 100 metre freestyle, 400 metre freestyle, 4x100 metre freestyle relay, 4x200 metre freestyle relay and 4×100 metre medley relay events.
