= Jerry Jeremiah =

Vanuatuan sprinter

Personal information
- Born: August 1, 1963 (age 62) Malakula, Malampa, Vanuatu
- Height: 1.65 m (5 ft 5 in)
- Weight: 65 kg (143 lb)

Sport
- Country: Vanuatu
- Sport: Athletics
- Event: 100 metres

Jerome "Jerry" Jeremiah (born 1 August 1963, in Malakula) is a Vanuatuan sprinter.

Jeremiah competed at the 1988 Summer Olympics held in Seoul, in his country's first-ever appearance at the Summer Olympics.

He entered the 100 metres and ran a time of 10.96 seconds and finished 8th in his heat and thus didn't qualify for the next round.

He also ran in the 200 metres and recorded a time of 22.01 seconds and finished 7th in his heat but again he failed to qualify for the next round.

He also competed at the 1986 Commonwealth Games and at the 1987 World Championships in Athletics and 1991 World Championships in Athletics.
