= Robert Stone (sprinter) =

Australian sprinter (born 1965)

Robert Stone (born 5 January 1965) is an Australian former sprinter who competed in the 1988 Summer Olympics.

He won the Australian Championship 200 in 1986 and 1990.

Also competed at the 1986 Edinburgh Commonwealth Games, where he finished 4th in the 200m final.
