= George Adrain =

Scottish lawn bowler

Personal information
- Nationality: British (Scottish)
- Born: 12 April 1953 (age 73)

Sport
- Club: Dreghorn BC
Medal record
Representing Scotland
Commonwealth Games
Gold medal – first place	1986 Edinburgh	pairs
Gold medal – first place	1990 Auckland	fours
World Outdoor Championships
Bronze medal – third place	1988 Auckland	team
Gold medal – first place	1996 Adelaide	triples
Gold medal – first place	1996 Adelaide	team
Representing United States
World Outdoor Championships
Gold medal – first place	1984 Aberdeen	pairs

George Adrain (born 12 April 1953) is a former Scottish international lawn bowler.

== Personal life ==
George is from a famous bowling family, his father (Willie Adrain) and uncle also called (Willie) were both Scottish internationals. He started bowling aged 14 in early 1968 after being introduced to the sport by his father.

== Bowls career ==
George won the Scottish Triples in 1974 and British Triples in 1975. His biggest achievement came in the 1984 World Outdoor Championships in Aberdeen but bizarrely it was representing the United States. Jim Candelet fell ill during the competition leaving Skippy Arculli without a partner so Adrain the Scottish reserve took his place and the pair went on to win the gold medal.

He won two gold medals for Scotland however when he partnered Grant Knox to win the Pairs Gold at the 1986 Commonwealth Games in Edinburgh and was part of the fours team at the 1990 Commonwealth Games in Auckland, New Zealand. The team consisted of Denis Love, Ian Bruce and Willie Wood.

He was also part of the triples team that took Gold at the 1996 World Outdoor Championships. His clubs were the Dreghorn (Outdoors) and Irvine (Indoors).

He also won the Scottish National Bowls Championships triples title in 1974 and the pairs title in 1997 and 2002. In 1985, he won the Hong Kong International Bowls Classic singles title, in addition to winning two pairs titles in 1985 and 1986.
