= Maloni Bole =

Fijian sprinter (born 1968)

Personal information
- Nationality: Fijian
- Born: 22 November 1968 (age 57)

Sport
- Sport: Sprinting
- Event: 100 metres

Maloni Bole (born 22 November 1968) is a Fijian sprinter. He competed in the men's 100 metres at the 1988 Summer Olympics.
