= List of Commonwealth Games medallists in cycling =

This is the complete list of Commonwealth Games medalists in cycling from 1934 to 2022.

== Men's track ==
=== Time trial ===
Games	Gold	Silver	Bronze
1934	Dunc Gray; Australia	Bob McLeod; Canada	Ted Clayton; South Africa
1938	Bob Porter; Australia	Tasman Johnson; Australia	Ernie Mills; England
1950	Russell Mockridge; Australia	Sid Patterson; Australia	Tommy Godwin; England
1954	Dick Ploog; Australia		Keith Harrison; England
1954	Alfred Swift; South Africa		Keith Harrison; England
1958	Neville Tong; England	Warren Scarfe; Australia	Warwick Dalton; New Zealand
1962	Peter Bartels; Australia	Ian Chapman; Australia	Roger Whitfield; England
1966	Roger Gibbon; Trinidad and Tobago	Philip Bristow-Stagg; Australia	Richard Hine; Australia
1970	Harry Kent; New Zealand	Leslie King; Trinidad and Tobago	Jocelyn Lovell; Canada
1974	Richard Paris; Australia	John Nicholson; Australia	Ian Hallam; England
1978	Jocelyn Lovell; Canada	Kenrick Tucker; Australia	Gordon Singleton; Canada
1982	Craig Adair; New Zealand	Chris Wilson; Australia	Terrence Tinsley; England
1986	Martin Vinnicombe; Australia	Gary Anderson; New Zealand	Max Rainsford; Australia
1990	Martin Vinnicombe; Australia	Gary Anderson; New Zealand	Jon Andrews; New Zealand
1994	Shane Kelly; Australia	Darryn Hill; Australia	Tim O'Shannessey; Australia
1998	Shane Kelly; Australia	Jason Queally; England	Joshua Kersten; Australia
2002	Chris Hoy; Scotland	Jason Queally; England	Jamie Staff; England
2006	Ben Kersten; Australia	Jason Queally; England	Chris Hoy; Scotland
2010	Scott Sunderland; Australia	Mohd Rizal Tisin; Malaysia	Eddie Dawkins; New Zealand
2014	Scott Sunderland; Australia	Simon van Velthooven; New Zealand	Matt Archibald; New Zealand
2018	Matthew Glaetzer; Australia	Eddie Dawkins; New Zealand	Callum Skinner; Scotland
2022	Matthew Glaetzer; Australia	Thomas Cornish; Australia	Nicholas Paul; Trinidad and Tobago

=== Sprint ===
Games	Gold	Silver	Bronze
1934	Ernest Higgins; England	Horace Pethybridge; Australia	Ted Clayton; South Africa
1938	Dunc Gray; Australia	Bob Porter; Australia	George Giles; New Zealand
1950	Russell Mockridge; Australia	Sid Patterson; Australia	Graham Avery; New Zealand
1954	Cyril Peacock; England	+not awarded	Thomas Shardelow; South Africa
1958	Dick Ploog; Australia	Karl Barton; England	Lloyd Binch; England
1962	Tom Harrison; Australia	Karl Barton; England	Ian Browne; Australia
1966	Roger Gibbon; Trinidad and Tobago	Jim Booker; England	Daryl Perkins; Australia
1970	John Nicholson; Australia	Gordon Johnson; Australia	Leslie King; Trinidad and Tobago
1974	John Nicholson; Australia	Xavier Mirander; Jamaica	Ian Atherly; Trinidad and Tobago
1978	Kenrick Tucker; Australia	Trevor Gadd; England	David Weller; Jamaica
1982	Kenrick Tucker; Australia	Mike McRedmond; New Zealand	Murray Steele; New Zealand
1986	Gary Neiwand; Australia	Alex Ongaro; Canada	Eddie Alexander; Scotland
1990	Gary Neiwand; Australia	Curt Harnett; Canada	Jon Andrews; New Zealand
1994	Gary Neiwand; Australia	Curt Harnett; Canada	Darryn Hill; Australia
1998	Darryn Hill; Australia	Sean Eadie; Australia	Barry Forde; Barbados
2002	Ryan Bayley; Australia	Sean Eadie; Australia	Jobie Dajka; Australia
2006	Ryan Bayley; Australia	Ross Edgar; Scotland	Travis Smith; Canada
2010	Shane Perkins; Australia	Scott Sunderland; Australia	Sam Webster; New Zealand
2014	Sam Webster; New Zealand	Jason Kenny; England	Eddie Dawkins; New Zealand
2018	Sam Webster; New Zealand	Jack Carlin; Scotland	Jacob Schmid; Australia
2022	Matthew Richardson; Australia	Nicholas Paul; Trinidad and Tobago	Jack Carlin; Scotland

+ Lionel Cox did not receive a silver medal, the Australian cycling team refused to participate in the gold and bronze medal playoffs and were subsequently disqualified.

=== Team sprint ===
Games	Gold	Silver	Bronze
2002	Australia; Jobie Dajka; Sean Eadie; Ryan Bayley	England; Jamie Staff; Jason Queally; Andy Slater	Scotland; Chris Hoy; Craig MacLean; Ross Edgar
2006	Scotland; Ross Edgar; Chris Hoy; Craig MacLean	England; Matthew Crampton; Jason Queally; Jamie Staff	Australia; Ryan Bayley; Shane Kelly; Shane Perkins
2010	Australia; Daniel Ellis; Jason Niblett; Scott Sunderland	New Zealand; Eddie Dawkins; Ethan Mitchell; Sam Webster	Malaysia; Azizulhasni Awang; Josiah Ng; Mohd Rizal Tisin
2014	New Zealand; Eddie Dawkins; Ethan Mitchell; Sam Webster	England; Philip Hindes; Jason Kenny; Kian Emadi	Australia; Matthew Glaetzer; Nathan Hart; Shane Perkins
2018	New Zealand; Ethan Mitchell; Sam Webster; Edward Dawkins	England; Ryan Owens; Joseph Truman; Philip Hindes	Australia; Nathan Hart; Jacob Schmid; Patrick Constable; Matthew Glaetzer*
2022	Australia; Leigh Hoffman; Matthew Richardson; Matthew Glaetzer	England; Ryan Owens; Hamish Turnbull; Joe Truman	New Zealand; Bradly Knipe; Sam Dakin; Sam Webster

=== Individual pursuit ===
Games	Gold	Silver	Bronze
1950	Cyril Cartwright; England	Russell Mockridge; Australia	Les Lock; New Zealand
1954	Norman Sheil; England	Peter Brotherton; England	Robert Fowler; South Africa
1958	Norman Sheil; England	Tom Simpson; England	Warwick Dalton; New Zealand
1962	Maxwell Langshaw; Australia	Richard Hine; Australia	Harry Jackson; England
1966	Hugh Porter; England	John Bylsma; Australia	Richard Hine; Australia
1970	Ian Hallam; England	Danny Clark; Australia	Blair Stockwell; New Zealand
1974	Ian Hallam; England	William Moore; England	Gary Sutton; Australia
1978	Mike Richards; New Zealand	Gary Campbell; Australia	Tony Doyle; England
1982	Michael Turtur; Australia	Shaun Wallace; England	Alex Stieda; Canada
1986	Dean Woods; Australia	Colin Sturgess; England	Gary Anderson; New Zealand
1990	Gary Anderson; New Zealand	Mark Kingsland; Australia	Darren Winter; Australia
1994	Bradley McGee; Australia	Shaun Wallace; England	Stuart O'Grady; Australia
1998	Bradley McGee; Australia	Luke Roberts; Australia	Matt Illingworth; England
2002	Bradley McGee; Australia	Bradley Wiggins; England	Paul Manning; England
2006	Paul Manning; England	Rob Hayles; England	Steve Cummings; England
2010	Jack Bobridge; Australia	Jesse Sergent; New Zealand	Michael Hepburn; Australia
2014	Jack Bobridge; Australia	Alex Edmondson; Australia	Marc Ryan; New Zealand
2018	Charlie Tanfield; England	John Archibald; Scotland	Dylan Kennett; New Zealand
2022	Aaron Gate; New Zealand	Tom Sexton; New Zealand	Conor Leahy; Australia

=== Team pursuit ===
Games	Gold	Silver	Bronze
1974	England; Mick Bennett; Rik Evans; Ian Hallam; William Moore	Australia; Murray Hall; Kevin Nichols; Garry Reardon; Gary Sutton	New Zealand; Paul Brydon; René Heyde; Russell Nant; Blair Stockwell
1978	Australia; Colin Fitzgerald; Kevin Nichols; Gary Sutton; Shane Sutton	New Zealand; Kevin Blackwell; Anthony Cuff; Neil Lyster; Jack Swart	England; Tony Doyle; Paul Fennell; Tony James; Glen Mitchell
1982	Australia; Michael Grenda; Kevin Nichols; Michael Turtur; Gary West	New Zealand; Clem Captein; Brian Fowler; Graeme Miller; Murray Steele	England; Paul Curran; Tony Mayer; Darryl Webster; Shaun Wallace
1986	Australia; Glenn Clarke; Brett Dutton; Bill Hardy; Wayne McCarney; Dean Woods	New Zealand; Gary Anderson; Russell Clune; Stephen Swart; Andrew Whitford	England; Chris Boardman; Gary Coltman; Rob Muzio; Jon Walshaw; Guy Rowland
1990	New Zealand; Gary Anderson; Nigel Donnelly; Glenn McLeay; Stuart Williams	Australia; Brett Aitken; Stephen McGlede; Shaun O'Brien; Darren Winter	England; Chris Boardman; Simon Lillistone; Bryan Steel; Glen Sword
1994	Australia; Brett Aitken; Bradley McGee; Stuart O'Grady; Tim O'Shannessey	England; Tony Doyle; Rob Hayles; Chris Newton; Bryan Steel	New Zealand; Brendon Cameron; Julian Dean; Glen Thomson; Lee Vertongen
1998	Australia; Bradley McGee; Brett Lancaster; Luke Roberts; Michael Rogers; Timothy Lyons	England; Bradley Wiggins; Colin Sturgess; Jon Clay; Matt Illingworth; Rob Hayles	New Zealand; Brendon Cameron; Greg Henderson; Lee Vertongen; Tim Carswell
2002	Australia; Graeme Brown; Luke Roberts; Mark Renshaw; Peter Dawson; Stephen Wooldridge	England; Bradley Wiggins; Bryan Steel; Chris Newton; Paul Manning; Stephen Cummings	New Zealand; Greg Henderson; Hayden Roulston; Lee Vertongen; Matthew Randall
2006	England; Steve Cummings; Rob Hayles; Paul Manning; Chris Newton	Australia; Ashley Hutchinson; Matthew Goss; Stephen Wooldridge; Mark Jamieson	New Zealand; Hayden Godfrey; Timothy Gudsell; Marc Ryan; Peter Latham; Jason Allen
2010	Australia; Jack Bobridge; Michael Freiberg; Michael Hepburn; Dale Parker	New Zealand; Sam Bewley; Westley Gough; Marc Ryan; Jesse Sergent	Northern Ireland; Sean Downey; Martyn Irvine; Philip Lavery; David McCann
2014	Australia; Jack Bobridge; Luke Davison; Alex Edmondson; Glenn O'Shea	England; Steven Burke; Ed Clancy; Andy Tennant; Bradley Wiggins	New Zealand; Shane Archbold; Pieter Bulling; Marc Ryan; Dylan Kennett
2018	Australia; Alex Porter; Sam Welsford; Leigh Howard; Kelland O'Brien	England; Oliver Wood; Kian Emadi; Charlie Tanfield; Ethan Hayter	Canada; Michael Foley; Jay Lamoureux; Derek Gee; Aidan Caves
2022	New Zealand; Aaron Gate; Jordan Kerby; Tom Sexton; Campbell Stewart	England; Dan Bigham; Charlie Tanfield; Ethan Vernon; Oli Wood	Australia; Joshua Duffy; Graeme Frislie; Conor Leahy; Lucas Plapp; James Moriarty

=== Scratch ===
Games	Gold	Silver	Bronze
1934	Bob McLeod; Canada	Ted Clayton; South Africa	William Harvell; England
1938	William Maxfield; England	Ray Hicks; England	Syd Rose; South Africa
1950	Bill Heseltine; Australia	Les Lock; New Zealand	Ken Caves; Australia
1954	Lindsay Cocks; Australia	Keith Harrison; England	Don Skene; Wales
1958	Ian Browne; Australia	Warren Johnston; New Zealand	Don Skene; Wales
1962	Doug Adams; Australia	Warren Johnston; New Zealand	John Clarey; England
1966	Ian Alsop; England	Hilton Clarke; Australia	Trevor Bull; England
1970	Jocelyn Lovell; Canada	Brian Temple; Scotland	Vernon Stauble; Trinidad and Tobago
1974	Steve Heffernan; England	Murray Hall; Australia	Ian Hallam; England
1978	Jocelyn Lovell; Canada	Shane Sutton; Australia	Gary Sutton; Australia
1982	Kevin Nichols; Australia	Gary Hammond; Australia	Michael Turtur; Australia
1986	Wayne McCarney; Australia	Dean Woods; Australia	Gary Anderson; New Zealand
1990	Gary Anderson; New Zealand	Shaun O'Brien; Australia	Stephen McGlede; Australia
1994	Stuart O'Grady; Australia	Glenn McLeay; New Zealand	Brian Walton; Canada
1998	Michael Rogers; Australia	Shaun Wallace; England	Timothy Barswell; New Zealand
2002	Graeme Brown; Australia	Huw Pritchard; Wales	Tony Gibb; England
2006	Mark Cavendish; Isle of Man	Ashley Hutchinson; Australia	James McCallum; Scotland
2010	Cameron Meyer; Australia	Michael Freiberg; Australia	Zachary Bell; Canada
2014	Shane Archbold; New Zealand	Glenn O'Shea; Australia	Rémi Pelletier-Roy; Canada
2018	Sam Welsford; Australia	Campbell Stewart; New Zealand	Christopher Latham; England
2022	Corbin Strong; New Zealand	John Archibald; Scotland	William Roberts; Wales

=== Tandem ===
Games	Gold	Silver	Bronze
1970	Gordon Johnson; Ron Jonker; Australia	Jocelyn Lovell; Barry Harvey; Canada	John Hatfield; John Beswick; Wales
1974	Geoffrey Cooke; Ernie Crutchlow; England	John Rush; Danny O'Neil; Australia	Paul Medhurst; Philip Harland; New Zealand
1978	Jocelyn Lovell; Gordon Singleton; Canada	Trevor Gadd; Dave Le Grys; England	Ron Boyle; Steve Goodall; Australia

=== Points race ===
Games	Gold	Silver	Bronze
1990	Robert Burns; Australia	Craig Connell; New Zealand	Alistair Irvine; Northern Ireland
1994	Brett Aitken; Australia	Stuart O'Grady; Australia	Dean Woods; Australia
1998	Glen Thomson; New Zealand	Rob Hayles; England	Greg Henderson; New Zealand
2002	Greg Henderson; New Zealand	Mark Renshaw; Australia	Chris Newton; England
2006	Sean Finning; Australia	Hayden Roulston; New Zealand	Geraint Thomas; Wales
2010	Cameron Meyer; Australia	George Atkins; England	Mark Christian; Isle of Man
2014	Tom Scully; New Zealand	Peter Kennaugh; Isle of Man	Aaron Gate; New Zealand
2018	Mark Stewart; Scotland	Campbell Stewart; New Zealand	Ethan Hayter; England
2022	Aaron Gate; New Zealand	Campbell Stewart; New Zealand	Oli Wood; England

=== Keirin ===
Games	Gold	Silver	Bronze
2006	Ryan Bayley; Australia	Travis Smith; Canada	Ross Edgar; Scotland
2010	Josiah Ng; Malaysia	David Daniell; England	Simon van Velthooven; New Zealand
2014	Matthew Glaetzer; Australia	Sam Webster; New Zealand	Azizulhasni Awang; Malaysia
2018	Matthew Glaetzer; Australia	Lewis Oliva; Wales	Edward Dawkins; New Zealand
2022	Nicholas Paul; Trinidad and Tobago	Jack Carlin; Scotland	Shah Sahrom; Malaysia

== Men's road ==
=== Road race ===
Games	Gold	Silver	Bronze
1938	Hennie Binneman; South Africa	John Brown; New Zealand	Ray Jones; England
1950	Hector Sutherland; Australia	Nick Carter; New Zealand	Jack Fowler; Australia
1954	Eric Thompson; England	John Baird; New Zealand	Bernard Pusey; England
1958	Ray Booty; England	Frank Brazier; Australia	Stuart Slack; Isle of Man
1962	Wes Mason; England	Anthony Walsh; New Zealand	Laurie Byers; New Zealand
1966	Peter Buckley; Isle of Man	Des Thomson; New Zealand	Laurie Byers; New Zealand
1970	Bruce Biddle; New Zealand	Raymond Bilney; Australia	John Trevorrow; Australia
1974	Clyde Sefton; Australia	Phil Griffiths; England	Remo Sansonetti; Australia
1978	Phil Anderson; Australia	Pierre Harvey; Canada	Garry Bell; New Zealand
1982	Malcolm Elliott; England	Steve Bauer; Canada	Roger Sumich; New Zealand
1986	Paul Curran; England	Brian Fowler; New Zealand	Jeff Leslie; Australia
1990	Graeme Miller; New Zealand	Brian Fowler; New Zealand	Scott Goguen; Canada
1994	Mark Rendell; New Zealand	Brian Fowler; New Zealand	Willem Engelbrecht; South Africa
1998	Jay Sweet; Australia	Rosli Effandy; Malaysia	Eric Wohlberg; Canada
2002	Stuart O'Grady; Australia	Cadel Evans; Australia	Baden Cooke; Australia
2006	Mathew Hayman; Australia	David George; South Africa	Allan Davis; Australia
2010	Allan Davis; Australia	Hayden Roulston; New Zealand	David Millar; Scotland
2014	Geraint Thomas; Wales	Jack Bauer; New Zealand	Scott Thwaites; England
2018	Steele Von Hoff; Australia	Jon Mould; Wales	Clint Hendricks; South Africa
2022	Aaron Gate; New Zealand	Daryl Impey; South Africa	Finn Crockett; Scotland

=== Team time trial ===
Games	Gold	Silver	Bronze
1982	England; Joseph Waugh; Malcolm Elliott; Bob Downs; Steve Lawrence	Australia; John Watters; Remo Sansonetti; Ricky Flood; Michael Lynch	New Zealand; Blair Stockwell; Jack Swart; Stephen Carton; Stephen Cox
1986	England; Alan Gornall; Deno Davie; Keith Reynolds; Paul Curran	New Zealand; Blair Cox; Graeme Miller; Greg Fraine; Paul Leitch	Northern Ireland; Alastair Irvine; Cormac McCann; Joseph Barr; Martin Quinn
1990	New Zealand; Brian Fowler; Gavin Stevens; Graeme Miller; Ian Richards	Canada; Chris Koberstein; David Spears; Peter Verhesen; Sean Way	England; Chris Boardman; Peter Longbottom; Ben Luckwell; Wayne Randle
1994	Australia; Phil Anderson; Brett Dennis; Henk Vogels; Damian McDonald	England; Peter Longbottom; Matt Illingworth; Simon Lillistone; Paul Jennings	New Zealand; Brian Fowler; Paul Leitch; Tim Pawson; Mark Rendell

=== Individual time trial ===
Games	Gold	Silver	Bronze
1998	Eric Wohlberg; Canada	Stuart O'Grady; Australia	David George; South Africa
2002	Cadel Evans; Australia	Michael Rogers; Australia	Nathan O'Neill; Australia
2006	Nathan O'Neill; Australia	Benjamin Day; Australia	Gordon McCauley; New Zealand
2010	David Millar; Scotland	Alex Dowsett; England	Luke Durbridge; Australia
2014	Alex Dowsett; England	Rohan Dennis; Australia	Geraint Thomas; Wales
2018	Cameron Meyer; Australia	Harry Tanfield; England	Hamish Bond; New Zealand
2022	Rohan Dennis; Australia	Fred Wright; England	Geraint Thomas; Wales

== Men's mountain biking ==
=== Cross country ===
Games	Gold	Silver	Bronze
2002	Roland Green; Canada	Seamus McGrath; Canada	Liam Killeen; England
2006	Liam Killeen; England	Oli Beckingsale; England	Seamus McGrath; Canada
2014	Anton Cooper; New Zealand	Sam Gaze; New Zealand	Daniel McConnell; Australia
2018	Sam Gaze; New Zealand	Anton Cooper; New Zealand	Alan Hatherly; South Africa
2022	Sam Gaze; New Zealand	Ben Oliver; New Zealand	Alex Miller; Namibia

== Men's para-track ==
=== Tandem sprint B ===
Event	Gold	Silver	Bronze
2014	Scotland; Neil Fachie; Craig MacLean (pilot)	Australia; Kieran Modra; Jason Niblett (pilot)	Australia; Paul Kennedy; Thomas Clarke (pilot)
2018	Scotland; Neil Fachie; Matt Rotherham (pilot)	Wales; James Ball; Peter Mitchell (pilot)	Australia; Brad Henderson; Tom Clarke (pilot)
2022	Wales; James Ball; Matt Rotherham (Guide)	Scotland; Neil Fachie; Lewis Stewart (Guide)	Australia; Beau Wootton; Luke Zaccaria (Guide)

=== Tandem 1 km time trial B ===
Event	Gold	Silver	Bronze
2014	Scotland; Neil Fachie; Craig MacLean (pilot)	Australia; Kieran Modra; Jason Niblett (pilot)	Wales; Matt Ellis; Ieuan Williams (pilot)
2018	Scotland; Neil Fachie; Matt Rotherham (pilot)	Wales; James Ball; Peter Mitchell (pilot)	Australia; Brad Henderson; Tom Clarke (pilot)
2022	Scotland; Neil Fachie; Lewis Stewart (Guide)	Wales; James Ball; Matt Rotherham (Guide)	England; Stephen Bate; Christopher Latham (Guide)

== Women's track ==
=== Sprint ===
Games	Gold	Silver	Bronze
1990	Louise Jones; Wales	Julie Speight; Australia	Sue Golder; New Zealand
1994	Tanya Dubnicoff; Canada	Michelle Ferris; Australia	Donna Wynd; New Zealand
1998	Tanya Dubnicoff; Canada	Michelle Ferris; Australia	Lori-Ann Muenzer; Canada
2002	Kerrie Meares; Australia	Lori-Ann Muenzer; Canada	Anna Meares; Australia
2006	Victoria Pendleton; England	Anna Meares; Australia	Kerrie Meares; Australia
2010	Anna Meares; Australia	Becky James; Wales	Emily Rosemond; Australia
2014	Stephanie Morton; Australia	Anna Meares; Australia	Jessica Varnish; England
2018	Stephanie Morton; Australia	Natasha Hansen; New Zealand	Kaarle McCulloch; Australia
2022	Ellesse Andrews; New Zealand	Kelsey Mitchell; Canada	Emma Finucane; Wales

=== Kierin ===
Games	Gold	Silver	Bronze
2018	Stephanie Morton; Australia	Kaarle McCulloch; Australia	Natasha Hansen; New Zealand
2022	Ellesse Andrews; New Zealand	Sophie Capewell; England	Kelsey Mitchell; Canada

=== Individual pursuit ===
Games	Gold	Silver	Bronze
1990	Madonna Harris; New Zealand	Kathy Watt; Australia	Kelly-Ann Way; Canada
1994	Kathy Watt; Australia	Sarah Ulmer; New Zealand	Jacqui Nelson; New Zealand
1998	Sarah Ulmer; New Zealand	Alayna Burns; Australia	Yvonne McGregor; England
2002	Sarah Ulmer; New Zealand	Katherine Bates; Australia	Alison Wright; Australia
2006	Katie Mactier; Australia	Katherine Bates; Australia	Emma Jones; England
2010	Alison Shanks; New Zealand	Wendy Houvenaghel; Northern Ireland	Tara Whitten; Canada
2014	Joanna Rowsell; England	Annette Edmondson; Australia	Amy Cure; Australia
2018	Katie Archibald; Scotland	Rebecca Wiasak; Australia	Annette Edmondson; Australia
2022	Bryony Botha; New Zealand	Maeve Plouffe; Australia	Neah Evans; Scotland

=== Points race ===
Games	Gold	Silver	Bronze
1994	Yvonne McGregor; England	Jacqui Nelson; New Zealand	Sally Hodge; Wales
1998	Alayna Burns; Australia	Sarah Ulmer; New Zealand	Annie Gariepy; Canada
2002	Katherine Bates; Australia	Rochelle Gilmore; Australia	Clara Hughes; Canada
2006	Katherine Bates; Australia	Rochelle Gilmore; Australia	Katie Cullen; Scotland
2010	Megan Dunn; Australia	Lauren Ellis; New Zealand	Tara Whitten; Canada
2014	Laura Trott; England	Elinor Barker; Wales	Katie Archibald; Scotland
2018	Elinor Barker; Wales	Katie Archibald; Scotland	Neah Evans; Scotland
2022	Georgia Baker; Australia	Neah Evans; Scotland	Eluned King; Wales

=== Time trial ===
Games	Gold	Silver	Bronze
2002	Kerrie Meares; Australia	Julie Paulding; England	Lori-Ann Muenzer; Canada
2006	Anna Meares; Australia	Victoria Pendleton; England	Kerrie Meares; Australia
2010	Anna Meares; Australia	Kaarle McCulloch; Australia	Becky James; Wales
2014	Anna Meares; Australia	Stephanie Morton; Australia	Jessica Varnish; England
2018	Kaarle McCulloch; Australia	Stephanie Morton; Australia	Emma Cumming; New Zealand
2022	Kristina Clonan; Australia	Kelsey Mitchell; Canada	Sophie Capewell; England

=== Team sprint ===
Games	Gold	Silver	Bronze
2010	Australia; Anna Meares; Kaarle McCulloch	Scotland; Jenny Davis; Charline Joiner	Canada; Monique Sullivan; Tara Whitten
2014	not held		
2018	Stephanie Morton; Australia	Natasha Hansen; New Zealand	Kaarle McCulloch; Australia
2022	New Zealand; Ellesse Andrews; Olivia King; Rebecca Petch	Canada; Lauriane Genest; Kelsey Mitchell; Sarah Orban	Wales; Rhian Edmunds; Emma Finucane; Lowri Thomas

=== Team pursuit ===
Games	Gold	Silver	Bronze
2018	Australia; Alexandra Manly; Annette Edmondson; Ashlee Ankudinoff; Amy Cure	New Zealand; Kirstie James; Rushlee Buchanan; Racquel Sheath; Bryony Botha	Canada; Allison Beveridge; Annie Foreman-Mackey; Ariane Bonhomme; Stephanie Roorda
2022	Australia; Georgia Baker; Sophie Edwards; Chloe Moran; Maeve Plouffe	New Zealand; Ellesse Andrews; Bryony Botha; Michaela Drummond; Emily Shearman	England; Laura Kenny; Josie Knight; Maddie Leech; Sophie Lewis

=== Scratch ===
Games	Gold	Silver	Bronze
2010	Megan Dunn; Australia	Jo Kiesanowski; New Zealand	Anna Blyth; England
2014	Annette Edmondson; Australia	Amy Cure; Australia	Elinor Barker; Wales
2018	Amy Cure; Australia	Neah Evans; Scotland	Emily Kay; England
2022	Laura Kenny; England	Michaela Drummond; New Zealand	Maggie Coles-Lyster; Canada

== Women's road ==
=== Road race ===
Games	Gold	Silver	Bronze
1990	Kathy Watt; Australia	Lisa Brambani; England	Kathleen Shannon; Australia
1994	Kathy Watt; Australia	Linda Jackson; Canada	Alison Sydor; Canada
1998	Lyne Bessette; Canada	Susy Pryde; New Zealand	Anna Wilson; Australia
2002	Nicole Cooke; Wales	Sue Palmer-Komar; Canada	Rachel Heal; England
2006	Natalie Bates; Australia	Oenone Wood; Australia	Nicole Cooke; Wales
2010	Rochelle Gilmore; Australia	Lizzie Armitstead; England	Chloe Hosking; Australia
2014	Lizzie Armitstead; England	Emma Pooley; England	Ashleigh Moolman Pasio; South Africa
2018	Chloe Hosking; Australia	Georgia Williams; New Zealand	Danielle Rowe; Wales
2022	Georgia Baker; Australia	Neah Evans; Scotland	Sarah Roy; Australia

=== Team time trial ===
Games	Gold	Silver	Bronze
1994	Australia; Catherine Reardon; Kathy Watt; Louise Nolan; Rachel Victor	Canada; Alison Sydor; Anne Samplonius; Clara Hughes; Lesley Tomlinson	England; Julia Freeman; Maria Lawrence; Maxine Johnson; Yvonne McGregor

=== Individual time trial ===
Games	Gold	Silver	Bronze
1998	Anna Wilson; Australia	Linda Jackson; Canada	Kathy Watt; Australia
2002	Clara Hughes; Canada	Anna Millward; Australia	Lyne Bessette; Canada
2006	Oenone Wood; Australia	Kathy Watt; Australia	Sara Carrigan; Australia
2010	Tara Whitten; Canada	Linda Villumsen; New Zealand	Julia Shaw; England
2014	Linda Villumsen; New Zealand	Emma Pooley; England	Katrin Garfoot; Australia
2018	Katrin Garfoot; Australia	Linda Villumsen; New Zealand	Hayley Simmonds; England
2022	Grace Brown; Australia	Anna Henderson; England	Georgia Williams; New Zealand

== Women's mountain biking ==
=== Cross country ===
Event	Gold	Silver	Bronze
2002	Chrissy Redden; Canada	Susy Pryde; New Zealand	Mary Grigson; Australia
2006	Marie-Hélène Prémont; Canada	Rosara Joseph; New Zealand	Kiara Bisaro; Canada
2014	Catharine Pendrel; Canada	Emily Batty; Canada	Rebecca Henderson; Australia
2018	Annie Last; England	Evie Richards; England	Haley Smith; Canada
2022	Evie Richards; England	Zoe Cuthbert; Australia	Candice Lill; South Africa

== Women's para-track ==
=== Tandem sprint B ===
Event	Gold	Silver	Bronze
2014	England; Sophie Thornhill; Helen Scott (pilot)	Scotland; Aileen McGlynn; Louise Haston (pilot)	Australia; Brandie O'Connor; Breanna Hargreave (pilot)
2018	England; Sophie Thornhill; Helen Scott (pilot)	Only medal awarded	
2022	Australia; Jessica Gallagher; Caitlin Ward (Pilot)	Scotland; Aileen McGlynn; Ellie Stone (Pilot)	Not awarded.

=== Tandem 1 km time trial B ===
Event	Gold	Silver	Bronze
2014	England; Sophie Thornhill; Helen Scott (pilot)	Scotland; Aileen McGlynn; Louise Haston (pilot)	Australia; Brandie O'Connor; Breanna Hargreave (pilot)
2018	England; Sophie Thornhill; Helen Scott (pilot)	Only medal awarded	
2022	Australia; Jessica Gallagher; Caitlin Ward (Pilot)	England; Sophie Unwin; Georgia Holt (Pilot)	Scotland; Aileen McGlynn; Ellie Stone (Pilot)
