= Cycling at the 1986 Commonwealth Games =

- Venue: Track: Meadowbank Velodrome; Road: Edinburgh City Bypass
- Location: Edinburgh, Scotland
- Dates: 24 July to 2 August 1986

Cycling at the 1986 Commonwealth Games was the 12th appearance of Cycling at the Commonwealth Games. The events were held in Edinburgh, Scotland, from 24 July to 2 August 1986.

The track events were held at the Meadowbank Velodrome, which had also hosted the track cycling at the 1970 British Commonwealth Games. The track was 250 metres in circumference and was six metres in width with 45 degree banking. A refurbishment of the track was required on the velodrome for the 1986 Games at the cost of £400,000.

The road race was a 105 miles route, consisting of 16 laps of approximately 7 miles, centered on the dual carriageway of the Edinburgh City Bypass.

Australia topped the cycling medal table, by virtue of winning all of the five track gold medals available.

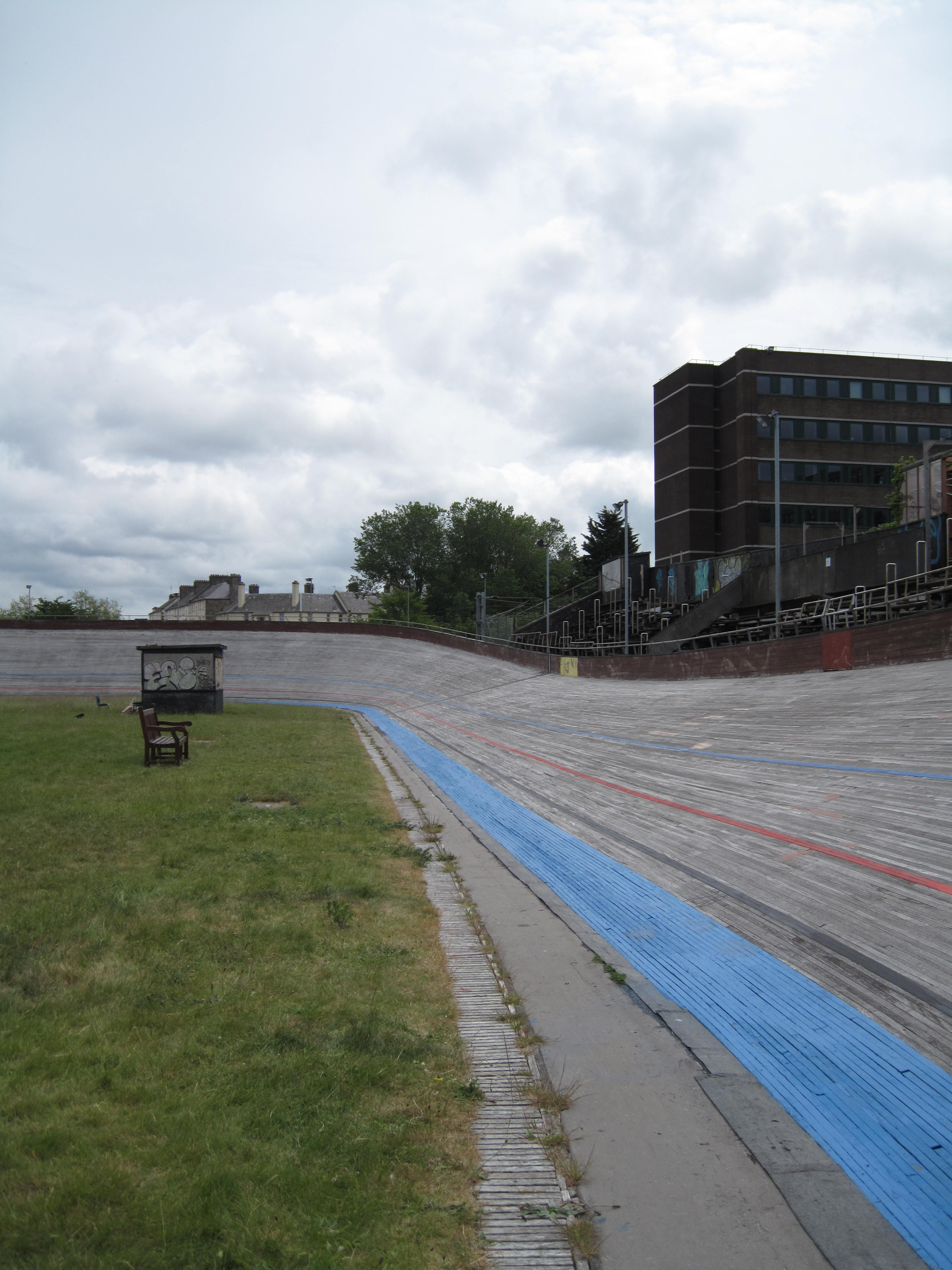
The Meadowbank Velodrome in 2015

== Medal table ==
* Host nation (Scotland)

Rank	Nation	Gold	Silver	Bronze	Total
1	Australia	5	1	2	8
2	England	2	1	1	4
3	New Zealand	0	4	2	6
4	Canada	0	1	0	1
5	Northern Ireland	0	0	1	1
5	Scotland*	0	0	1	1
Totals (6 entries)		7	7	7	21

== Medallists ==
Event	Gold	Silver	Bronze
Time trial	Martin Vinnicombe (AUS)	Gary Anderson (NZL)	Max Rainsford (AUS)
Sprint	Gary Neiwand (AUS)	Alex Ongaro (CAN)	Eddie Alexander (SCO)
Individual pursuit	Dean Woods (AUS)	Colin Sturgess (ENG)	Gary Anderson (NZL)
Team pursuit	Australia; Glenn Clarke; Brett Dutton; Bill Hardy; Wayne McCarney; Dean Woods	New Zealand; Gary Anderson; Russell Clune; Stephen Swart; Andrew Whitford	England; Chris Boardman; Gary Coltman; Rob Muzio; Jon Walshaw; Guy Rowland
10 miles scratch	Wayne McCarney (AUS)	Dean Woods (AUS)	Gary Anderson (NZL)
Road race	Paul Curran (ENG)	Brian Fowler (NZL)	Jeff Leslie (AUS)
Road team time trial	England; Alan Gornall; Deno Davie; Keith Reynolds; Paul Curran	New Zealand; Blair Cox; Graeme Miller; Greg Fraine; Paul Leitch	Northern Ireland; Alastair Irvine; Cormac McCann; Joe Barr; Martin Quinn

== Individual road race ==
Pos	Athlete	Time
1	(England) Paul Curran	4:08:50
2	(New Zealand) Brian Fowler	4:08:50
3	(Australia) Jeff Leslie	4:08:50
4	(England) Deno Davie	4:10:79
5	(New Zealand) Graeme Miller	4:10:79
6	(Australia) Stephen Hodge	4:10:81
7	(New Zealand) Stephen Cox	4:10:85
8	(Scotland) Andrew Wilson	4:11:79
9	(England) Alan Gornall	4:11:95
10	(England) Chris Lillywhite	4:12:06
11	(New Zealand) Craig Griffin	4:12:07
12	(Wales) Stuart Coles	4:12:56
13	(Northern Ireland) Cormac McCann	4:12:68
14	(Scotland) Brian Smith	4:13:68
15	(Wales) Ian Keith Jones	4:13:85
16	(Isle of Man) Stephen Porter	4:13:86
17	(Guernsey) Philip Sheard	4:13:86
18	(Isle of Man) Richard Fletcher	4:13:87
19	(Canada) Gervais Rioux	4:13:88
20	(Jersey) Tony Cornic	4:13:88
21	(Australia) Ronald Christian Versteegh	4:13:90
22	(Northern Ireland) Séamus Downey	4:13:90
23	(Scotland) Bob Melrose	4:14:06
24	(Northern Ireland) Alastair Irvine	4:18:74
25	(Isle of Man) Andrew Nicholson	4:33:04
26	(Guernsey) Ian Brown	4:33:04
27	(Northern Ireland) Ian Chivers	4:33:04
28	(Jersey) Toby Aubert	4:34:98
29	(Scotland) Michael Lawson	4:36:95

== Road team time trial ==
Pos	Team	Time
1	(England) Gornall, Davie, Reynolds, Curran	2:13:16
2	(New Zealand) Cox, Miller, Fraine, Leitch	2:14:50
3	(Northern Ireland) Irvine, McCann, Barr, Quinn	2:16:13
4	(Australia) Donald, Dwiar, Leslie, Rooney	2:16.41
5	(Canada) Spicer, Deslongchamps, Murray, Waddell	2:18.19
6	(Isle of Man) Kelly, Kennaugh, Fletcher, Porter	2:20.75
7	(Scotland) Hannah, Clark, Little, Melrose	2:22.49
8	(Wales) Coles, Evans, Hughes, Jones	2:26.27
9	(Hong Kong) Chak Bor Hui, Siu On Law, Tai-Ming, Yiu Chung Choy	2:30.39
10	(Guernsey) Brown, Rhodes, Sheard, Davies	2:30.47

== 1,000 metres match sprint ==
Pos	Athlete
1	(Australia) Gary Neiwand
2	(Canada) Alex Ongaro
3	(Scotland) Eddie Alexander
4	(England) Paul McHugh
5	(New Zealand) William Rastrick
6	(New Zealand) Mike McRedmond
7	(Canada) Curtis Harnett
8	(Scotland) Stewart Brydon
-	(Cayman Islands) Aldyn Wint
-	(Isle of Man) Gary Colin Hinds
-	(Isle of Man) Adrian Martin Mooney
-	(New Zealand) Murray Steele
-	(Wales) Steve Paulding
-	(Wales) Norton Davies
-	(Wales) Mike Murphy

Quarter finals

- Neiwand bt McRedmond 2–0
- McHugh bt Harnett 2–1
- Ongaro bt Brydon 2–0
- Alexander bt Rastrick 2–0

Semi finals

- Neiwand bt McHugh 2–0
- Ongaro bt Alecander 2–1

Bronze

- Alexander bt McHugh 2–0

Final

- Neiwand bt Ongaro 2–1

== Individual pursuit ==
Pos	Athlete
1	(Australia) Dean Woods
2	(England) Colin Sturgess
3	(New Zealand) Gary Anderson
4	(England) Rob Muzio
5	(Australia) Rik Patterson
6	(New Zealand) Andrew Whitford
7	(Australia) Mike Turtur
8	(England) Chris Boardman

Quarter finals

- Anderson 4.52.11 bt Patterson 4.53.93
- Muzio 4.57.35 bt Turtur 5.01.21
- Sturgess 4.49.80 bt Whitford 4.58.26
- Woods 4.44.72 bt Boardman caught 12 laps

Semi finals

- Sturgess 4.45.15 bt Anderson 4.45.33
- Woods bt Muzio caught 7 laps

Bronze

- Anderson 4.54.35 bt Muzio 4.54.87

Final

- Woods 4.43.92 bt Sturgess 4.51.23

== Team pursuit ==
Pos	Team
1	(Australia) Clarke, Dutton, Hardy, McCarney,Woods
2	(New Zealand) Anderson, Clune, Swart, Whitford
3	(England) Boardman, Coltman, Muzio, Walshaw, Rowland
4	(Canada) Beauchemin, Manson, McNutt, Vignaduzzi
5	(Wales) Westwood, Murphy, N. Davies, T. Davies

Semi finals

- New Zealand 4.29.17 bt England 4.31.37
- Australia bt Canada caught after 7 laps

Bronze medal

- England bt Canada caught after 15 laps

Final

- Australia 4.26.94 bt New Zealand 4.34.03

== Ten miles scratch race (64 laps) ==
Pos	Athlete	Time
1	(Australia) Wayne McCarney	19:40.61
2	(Australia) Dean Woods	
3	(New Zealand) Gary Anderson	
4	(England) Jon Walshaw	
5	(Canada) Patrick Beauchemin	
6	(Canada) Gianni Vignaduzzi	
7	(Australia) Mike Turtur	
8	(Scotland) Ken Clark	
9	(Northern Ireland) Alastair Irvine	
10	(Northern Ireland) David McCall	
11	(New Zealand) Murray Steele	
12	(England) Adrian Adgar	
13	(Isle of Man) Gary Colin Hinds	
