= Cycling at the 1974 British Commonwealth Games =

- Venue: Track: Denton Park Velodrome; Road: Cashmere Circuit
- Location: Christchurch, New Zealand
- Dates: 24 January to 2 February 1974

Cycling at the 1974 British Commonwealth Games was the 9th appearance of Cycling at the Commonwealth Games. The events were held in Christchurch, New Zealand, from 24 January to 2 February 1974.

The track events were held at Denton Park Velodrome on Chalmers Street in the west of Christchurch, which underwent reconstruction specifically for the Games. A new covered stand was added and the test event was the National Championships.

The road race was held in the south of Christchurch and was known as the Cashmere circuit, taking in Cashmere, Beckenham and Huntsbury. The distance was 114 miles, consisting of 17 laps of approximately 6.5 miles and included the Hackthorne Road 380 feet hill climb on each lap. 44 riders started at 7am on the last day of the Games.

England topped the cycling medal table, by virtue of winning four gold medals.

== Medal table ==
* Host nation (New Zealand)

Medals won by nation with totals, ranked by number of golds—sortable
Rank	Nation	Gold	Silver	Bronze	Total
1	England	4	2	2	8
2	Australia	3	4	2	9
3	Jamaica	0	1	0	1
4	New Zealand*	0	0	2	2
5	Trinidad and Tobago	0	0	1	1
Totals (5 entries)		7	7	7	21

== Medallists ==
Event	Gold	Silver	Bronze
Time trial	(Australia) Dick Paris	(Australia) John Nicholson	(England) Ian Hallam
Sprint	(Australia) John Nicholson	(Jamaica) Xavier Mirander	(Trinidad and Tobago) Ian Atherly
Individual pursuit	(England) Ian Hallam	(England) Willi Moore	(Australia) Gary Sutton
Team pursuit	(England) Mick Bennett; Rik Evans; Ian Hallam; Willi Moore	(Australia) Murray Hall; Kevin Nichols; Garry Reardon; Gary Sutton	(New Zealand) Paul Brydon; René Heyde; Russell Nant; Blair Stockwell
10 miles scratch	(England) Steve Heffernan	(Australia) Murray Hall	(England) Ian Hallam
Tandem	(England) Geoff Cooke; Ernest Crutchlow	(Australia) John Rush; Danny O'Neil	(New Zealand) Paul Medhurst; Philip Harland
Road race	(Australia) Clyde Sefton	(England) Phil Griffiths	(Australia) Remo Sansonetti

== Results ==
=== Road Race ===
Pos	Athlete	Time
1	(Australia) Clyde Sefton	5:07:16.87 hours
2	(England) Phil Griffiths	5:07:45.95
3	(Australia) Remo Sansonetti	5:17:26.08
4	(New Zealand) Vern Hanaray	5:17:27.83
5	(New Zealand) Garry Bell	5:18:25.83
6	(England) Phil Edwards	5:19:18.35
7	(Scotland) William Nickson	5:19:18.48
8	(England) Peter Watson	5:19:18.89
9	(Scotland) Alex Gilchrist	5:19:23.37
10	(Canada) Max Grace	5:20:17.16
11	(Northern Ireland) Dave Kane	5:25:31.97
12	(Isle of Man) Gordon Gale	5:25:37.40

=== 10 miles scratch race ===
Pos	Athlete	Time
1	(England) Steve Heffernan	20:51.25 mins
2	(Australia) Murray Hall	20:51.61
3	(England) Ian Hallam	20:51.66
4	(Australia) Kevin Nichols	20:51.72
5	(England) Mick Bennett	20:51.73
6	(New Zealand) Paul Brydon	20:51.78
7	(Canada) Brian Keast	20:51.79
8	(Isle of Man) Michael Kelly	20:52.46
9	(Jersey) Allan Miller	
10	(Isle of Man) Bernard Shimell	

=== 4,000m individual pursuit ===
Pos	Athlete
1	(England) Ian Hallam
2	(England) Willi Moore
3	(Australia) Gary Sutton
4	(New Zealand) Blair Stockwell
5	(Australia) John Edward Sanders
5	(Scotland) William Nickson
5	(England) Mick Bennett
5	(Australia) Dick Paris

Quarter-final

Athlete	Athlete	Score
Moore	Nickson	5.10.90/5:21.84
Sutton	Bennett	5.10.11/5:19.97
Hallam	Sanders	5.04.12/5:17.45
Stockwell	Paris	5.21.19/5:30.77

Semi finals

Athlete	Athlete	Score
Hallam	Sutton	5.09.63/5.17.17
Moore	Stockwell	5.06.19/5.09.17

Third place

Athlete	Athlete	Score
Sutton	Stockwell	5.09.17/5.09.47

Final

Athlete	Athlete	Score
Hallam	Moore	5.05.46/5.11.81

=== Time trial (1km) ===
Pos	Athlete	Time
1	(Australia) Dick Paris	1:11.85 mins
2	(Australia) John Nicholson	1:11.92
3	(England) Ian Hallam	1:12.15
4	(New Zealand) Rene Heyde	1:12.16
5	(Australia) Gary Reardon	1:12.72
6	(New Zealand) Jacob Schriek	1:12.81
7	(Jamaica) Xavier Mirander	1:13.39
8	(England) Rik Evans	1:13.68
9	(England) Steve Heffernan	1:13.74
10	(New Zealand) John Dean	1:14.22
11	(Trinidad and Tobago) Ian Atherly	1:14.53
12	(Trinidad and Tobago) Noel Lucas	1:15.66
13	(Scotland) William Nickson	1:15.67
14	(Wales) John Tudor	1:15.85
15	(Canada) Brian Keast	1:16.55
16	(Wales) John Pritchard	1:16.86
17	(Scotland) Alex Gilchrist	1:17.14
18	(Scotland) John Clark	1:17.38
19	(Malaysia) Daud Ibrahim	1:17.58
20	(Wales) Phillip Taylor	1:17.90

=== 1,000m match sprint ===
Pos	Athlete
1	(Australia) John Nicholson
2	(Jamaica) Xavier Mirander
3	(Trinidad and Tobago) Ian Atherly
4	(Australia) Greg Williams
5	(New Zealand) Paul Medhurst
6	(Australia) Gregory John Barnes
7	(New Zealand) Bryce Preston
8	(England) Ernie Crutchlow

Quarter-final

Athlete	Athlete	Score
Atherly	Barnes	2–1
Williams	Crutchlow	2–0
Mirander	Preston	2–0
Nicholson	Medhurst	2–0

Semi finals

Athlete	Athlete	Score
Nicholson	Atherly	2–0
Mirander	Williams	2–0

Third place

Athlete	Athlete	Score
Atherly	Williams	2–0

Final

Athlete	Athlete	Score
Nicholson	Mirander	2–0

=== Tandem (2,000m) ===
Pos	Athlete
1	(England) Geoff Cooke & Ernie Crutchlow
2	(Australia) John Rush & Danny O'Neil
3	(New Zealand) Paul Medhurst & Philip Harland
4	(Wales) John Hatfield & John Tudor

Semi finals

Athlete	Athlete
Australia	New Zealand
England	Wales

Third place

Athlete	Athlete
New Zealand	Wales

Final

Athlete	Athlete
England	Australia

=== Team pursuit ===
Pos	Athlete
1	(England) Bennett, Evans, Hallam, Moore
2	(Australia) Hall, Nichols, Reardon, Sutton
3	(New Zealand) Brydon, Heyde, Nant, Stockwell
4	(Scotland) Clark, Gilchrist, Gordon, Nickson
5	(Wales) Hatfield, Smith, Taylor, Demery

Semi finals

Team	Team	Time
Australia	New Zealand	4.53.24
England	Scotland	4.31.31

Third place

Team	Team	Time
New Zealand	Scotland	4:45.90/4:57.99

Final

Team	Team	Time
England	Australia	4:40.50/4:49.22
