= Cycling at the 1986 Commonwealth Games – Men's 1 km time trial =

Cycling Track – Men's 1km time trial at the 1986 Commonwealth Games
- Venue: Meadowbank Velodrome
- Location: Edinburgh, Scotland
- Dates: July 1986
- Competitors: 26

Medalists
gold medal	Martin Vinnicombe	Australia
silver medal	Gary Anderson	New Zealand
bronze medal	Maxwell Rainsford	Australia

The men's 1 km time trial at the 1986 Commonwealth Games, was part of the cycling programme, which took place in July 1986.

== Results ==
Rank	Rider	Time
1st place, gold medalist(s)	Martin Vinnicombe (AUS)	1:06.230
2nd place, silver medalist(s)	Gary Anderson (NZL)	1:06.334
3rd place, bronze medalist(s)	Maxwell Rainsford (AUS)	1:07.346
4	Wayne McCarney (AUS)	1:07.429
5	Paul Manson (CAN)	1:07.834
6	Gary Coltman (ENG)	1:07.835
7	Curtis Harnett (CAN)	1:07.899
8	Eddie Alexander (SCO)	1:08.132
9	Pierre Jordan (NZL)	1:08.633
10	Murray Steele (NZL)	1:08:661
11	Gary Altwasser (CAN)	1:08.850
12	Jon Walshaw (ENG)	1:09.126
13	Colin Sturgess (ENG)	1:09.280
14	Steve Paulding (WAL)	1:09.739
15	Stewart Brydon (SCO)	1:10.165
16	Alistair Adams (SCO)	1:10.668
17	Norton Davies (WAL)	1:11.909
18	Timothy Davies (WAL)	1:12.059
19	Adrian Mooney (IOM)	1:12.516
20	Gary Hinds (IOM)	1:14.655
21	David McCall (NIR)	1:16.176
22	William Rusia (FIJ)	1:16.618
23	Ian Brown (GUE)	1:17.387
24	Steve Davies (GUE)	1:17.741
25	Housen Fong (FIJ)	1:19.644
26	Aldyn Wint (CAY)	1:20.335
