= Cycling at the 1938 British Empire Games =

- Venue: Henson Park, Marrickville (track); Centennial Park (road)
- Location: Sydney, Australia
- Dates: 5 – 12 February 1938

Cycling at the 1938 British Empire Games was the second appearance of Cycling at the Commonwealth Games. The track events took place at Henson Park, Marrickville, an asphalt and bitumen outdoor track, while the road race was centered around Centennial Park.

Australia topped the cycling medal table with two gold medals.

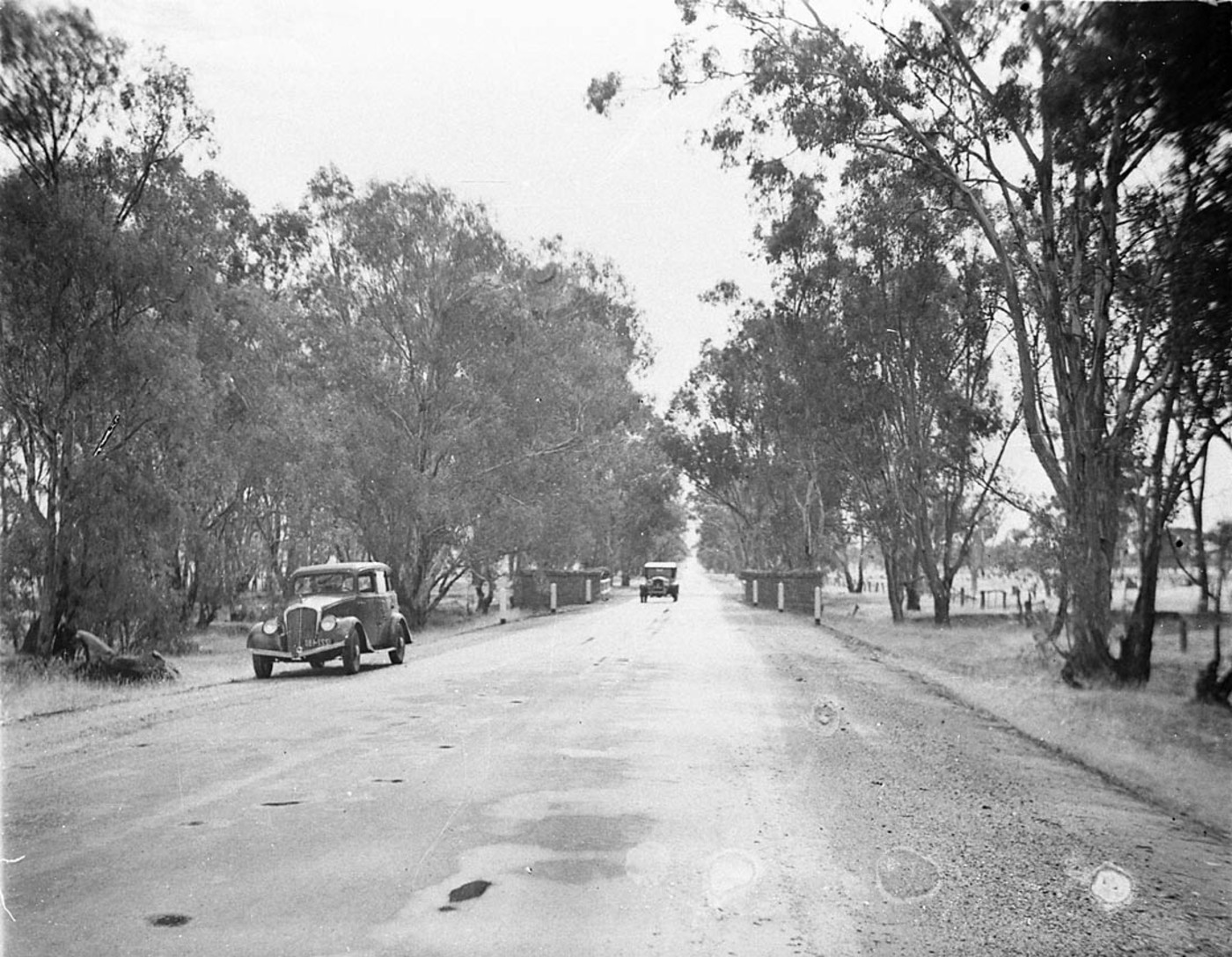
Centennial Park hosted the road race

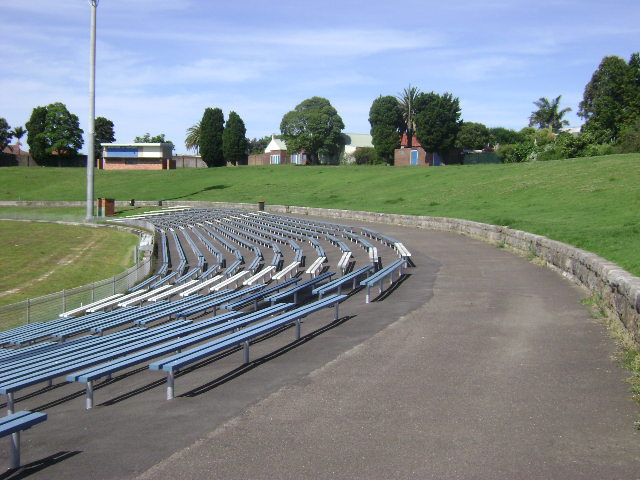
Henson Park hosted the track races

== Medal table ==
* Host nation (Australia)

Rank	Nation	Gold	Silver	Bronze	Total
1	Australia*	2	2	0	4
2	England	1	1	2	4
3	South Africa (SAF)	1	0	1	2
4	New Zealand	0	1	1	2
Totals (4 entries)		4	4	4	12

== Medal winners ==
Event	Gold	Silver	Bronze
Time Trial	Bob Porter (AUS)	Tassy Johnson (AUS)	Ernie Mills (ENG)
Sprint 1000 yd	Dunc Gray (AUS)	Bob Porter (AUS)	George Giles (NZL)
10-mile Scratch	William Maxfield (ENG)	Ray Hicks (ENG)	(South Africa) Sidney Rose (SAF)
Road Race	(South Africa) Hennie Binneman (SAF)	John Brown (NZL)	Ray Jones (ENG)

== Results ==
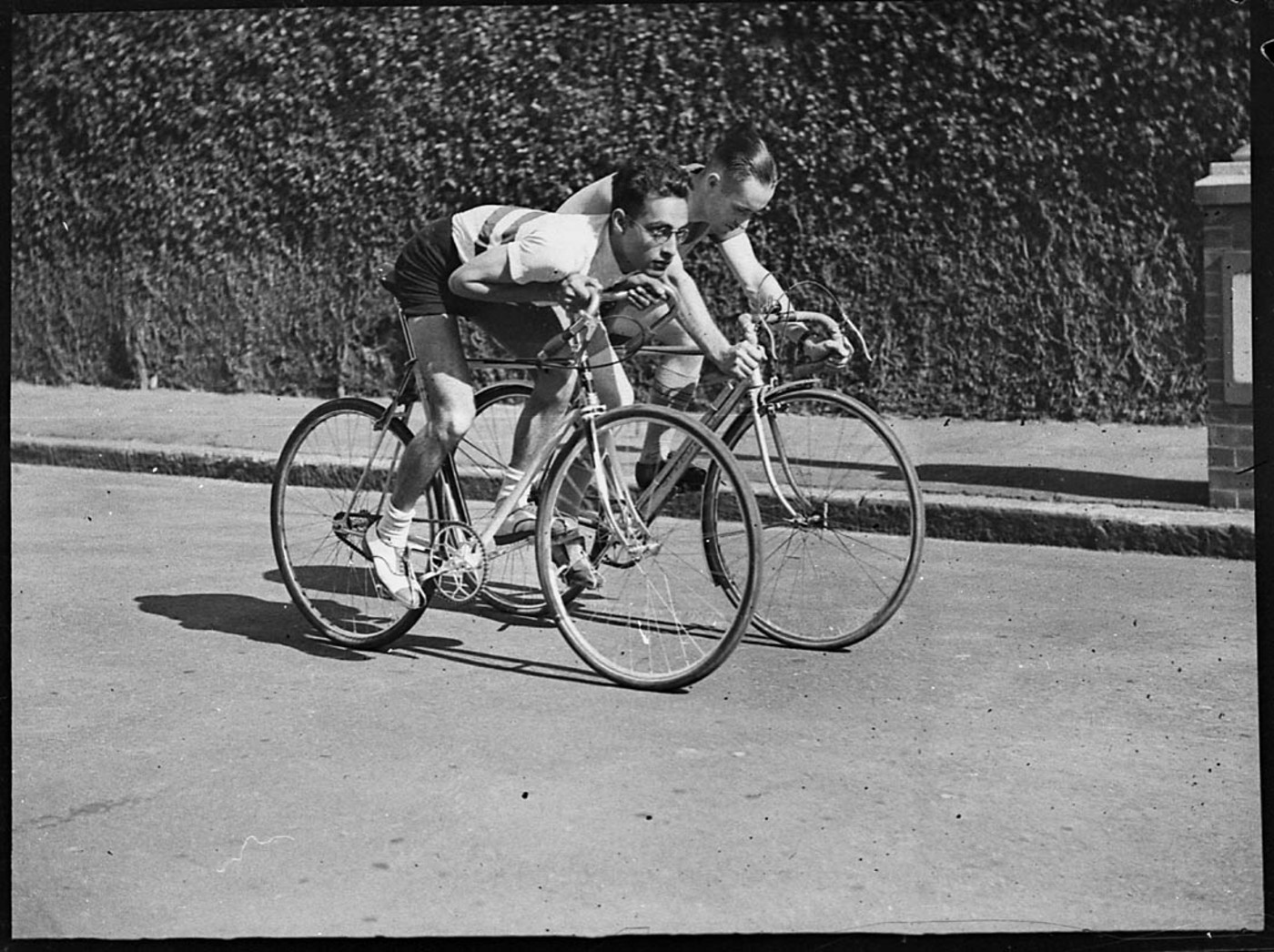
1938 Games cyclists, racing or training

=== 1,000m Time Trial ===
Pos	Athlete	Time
1	(Australia) Bob Porter	1:15.2 mins
2	(Australia) Tasman Johnson	1:15.7 mins
3	(England) Ernie Mills	1:15.9 mins
4	(England) William Maxfield	1:16.3 mins
5	(Australia) Dunc Gray	1:16.5 mins
6	(New Zealand) Ron Ulmer	1:16.6 mins
8	(England) Ray Hicks	1:16.9 mins
9	(New Zealand) George Giles	1:17.3 mins
10	(Canada) Morris Robinson	1:17.7 mins
11	(Canada) Islwyn Lampard	1:18.8 mins
12	(South Africa) Sidney Rose	1:18.8 mins
13	(South Africa) Hennie Binneman	1:20.5 mins
14	(India) Janki Das	1:22.8 mins

=== 10 mile scratch race ===
Mills team rode Maxfield and Hicks before pulling out on the last lap.

Pos	Athlete	Time
1	(England) William Maxfield	24:44.0
2	(England) Ray Hicks	
3	(South Africa) Sidney Rose	
4	(Australia) Fred Ashby	
5	(Australia) John Molloy	
6	(Wales) Reg Braddick	
	(England) Ernie Mills	unplaced
	(South Africa) Hennie Binneman	unplaced
	(Canada) Morris Robinson	unplaced
	(Canada) George Graves	unplaced
	(Canada) Islwyn Lampard	unplaced
	(New Zealand) George Giles	unplaced
	(New Zealand) Gordon Patrick	unplaced
	(New Zealand) Ron Ulmer	unplaced
	(Australia) Charlie E. Wright	dnf, mechanical
	(India) Janki Das	dnf fell

=== 1,000 yards sprint championship ===
First Round

- (New Zealand) George Giles bt (India) Janki Das
- (New Zealand) Ron Ulmer bt (Australia) Dunc Gray
- (Australia) Tassy Johnson bt (Canada) Islwyn Lampard
- (England) William Maxfield bt (South Africa) Sidney Rose
- (England) Ray Hicks bt (Canada) Morris Robinson
- (New Zealand) Roy Taylor bt (New Zealand) Bob Porter

Repechage

- Gray bt Robinson
- Porter bt Lampard

Quarter finals

- Ulmer bt Hicks
- Giles bt Johnson
- Gray bt Taylor
- Porter bt Maxfield

Semi finals

- Gray bt Ulmer
- Porter bt Giles

Third place

- Giles bt Ulmer

Final

- Gray bt Porter by a wheel

=== Road Race ===
Pos	Athlete	Time
1	(South Africa) Hennie Binneman	2'53:29.6
2	(New Zealand) John Brown	s.t
3	(England) Ray Jones	s.t
4	(England) Ernie Mills	
5	(Canada) Morris Robinson	
6	(Australia) Fred Hines	
	(Australia) Alick Yuille	dnf
	(Australia) Harold Clayton	dnf
	(Canada) George Graves	dnf
	(Canada) Islwyn Lampard	dnf
	(England) William Maxfield	dnf
	(India) Janki Das	dnf
	(New Zealand) Frank Grose	dnf
	(New Zealand) Ronald Triner	dnf
	(South Africa) Sidney Rose	dnf
	(Wales) Reg Braddick	dnf

== See also ==
- List of Commonwealth Games medallists in cycling
- Cycling at the Commonwealth Games
