= Gordon Patrick (cyclist) =

New Zealand cyclist

Personal information
- Full name: Alexander Gordon Patrick
- Born: 13 June 1914 Mount Eden, Auckland, New Zealand
- Died: 19 March 2014 (aged 99) Pakuranga, New Zealand
- Relative: Ronald Triner (cousin) Dr Alexandra Muthu (granddaughter) Victor Bruce Patrick (son) Dr Alasdair Patrick (grandson) Andrew Patrick (grandson) Tessa Patrick (daughter) Carrie Patrick (daughter) Ian Patrick (son) Ross Patrick (son)

Sport
- Country: New Zealand
- Sport: Cycling
- Club: Manukau Amateur Cycling Club

Achievements and titles
- National finals: Paced 10-mile champion (1937)

Alexander Gordon Patrick (13 June 1914 – 19 March 2014) was a New Zealand track cyclist who represented his country at the 1938 British Empire Games.

== Early life and family ==
Born in the Auckland suburb of Mount Eden on 13 June 1914, Patrick was the son of Andrew Taylor Patrick and Ethel Mary Patrick (née Triner). Through his mother, he was a first cousin of Ronald Triner, who also represented New Zealand as a cyclist at the 1938 British Empire Games.

== Cycling ==
A member of the Manuaku Amateur Cycling Club, Patrick was third, behind Ron Ulmer and Frank Grose, in the paced 10-mile race at the New Zealand cycling championships in 1935. He went on to win the same event at the national championships in 1937, recording a time of 20:33.

At the 1938 British Empire Games in Sydney, Patrick competed in the 10-mile scratch race but was unplaced.

== Military service ==
During World War II, Patrick served as a corporal in the Royal New Zealand Air Force.

== Sailing ==
Patrick was an accomplished sailor of the Mistral class of two-handed dinghy, originally designed by Des Townson in 1959, and was a life member of the New Zealand Mistral Owners' Association. He also used his skills as a woodwork teacher to build wooden Mistrals.

== Death ==
Patrick died in Pakuranga on 19 March 2014, aged 99 years.
