= 1938 Australian Track Cycling Championships =

- Venue: Melbourne, Australia
- Date: 15 – 20 December 1937
- Velodrome: Exhibition Track
- Events: 7

The 1938 Australian Track Cycling Championships were held in Melbourne from 15 to 20 December 1937. The decision to hold the 1938 championships in 1937 came as a surprise to many, including the Queensland Amateur Cyclists Union. The Championships also doubled as the trials for the 1938 British Empire Games.

Event	Gold	Silver	Bronze
1 Mile Scratch Race	Bob Porter (NSW)	Tassy Johnson (Vic)	Dunc Gray (NSW)
5 Mile Scratch Race	J. Molloy	Tassy Johnson (Vic)	Fred Ashby (Vic / Carnegie)
10 Mile Scratch Race	Fred Ashby (Vic / Carnegie)	J. Molloy	Tassy Johnson (Vic)
1,000 Metres Sprint	Dunc Gray (NSW)	Billy Guyatt (Vic)	Tassy Johnson (Vic)
1,000 Metre Time Trial	Dunc Gray (NSW)	Fred Ashby (Vic / Carnegie), Peter Thomas - equal	n/a
1 Mile Junior Championship (paced)	J. Walsh (NSW)	H. Solomon	?
5 Mile Junior Scratch Race	H. Solomon	J. Walsh (NSW)	Jenkins

Healing Shield Winners: Victoria
