= 1963 Australian Track Cycling Championships =

- Venue: Brisbane, Australia (amateur) / Melbourne, Australia (professional)
- Date(s): 2–9 March 1963
- Velodrome: Hawthorne Park Velodrome (amateur) / Olympic Velodrome (professional)
- Events: 18

The 1963 Australian Track Cycling Championships were held from 2–9 March 1963. The amateur titles were held at the Hawthorne Park Velodrome in Brisbane, while the Professional titles were held concurrently at the Olympic Velodrome in Melbourne.

== Amateur Championships ==
The amateur championships were held at the Hawthorne Park velodrome, Brisbane. The championships were marred by a bad fall when ex-Olympian Lionel Cox fell and crashed head first into a lamp post. Visiting riders believed this (and other falls) were in part due to the poor track conditions.

Event	Gold	Silver	Bronze
Senior Men
1,000m Sprint	T. Harrison (Vic)	R. Clark (Qld)	I. Chapman (W.A.)
4,000m Individual Pursuit	Henk Vogels (W.A.)	Dick Paris (NSW)	Bob Baird (SA)
4,000m Team Pursuit	Victoria (Paul Bowker, Ian Browne, Vic Browne, John Hind)	New South Wales (Dick Paris, John Bullen, John Lawrence, John Hardacre)	TBC
10 Mile Scratch Race	R. Clark (Qld)	Paul Bowker (Vic / Carnegie)	J. Bullen (NSW)
2,000m Tandem	Mal McCredle, Ron Bonham (NSW)	Lionel Cox, John Hardacre (NSW)	TBC
Junior Men
1,000m Sprint	Gordon Johnson (Vic)	Keith Bannon (NSW)	Hal Galloway (NSW)
5 Mile Scratch Race	Gordon Johnson (Vic)	Keith Bannon (NSW)	V. Smith (Vic)

Healing Shield Winners: TBC

== Professional Championships ==
The professional championships were held at the Olympic Velodrome in Melbourne, with some events being held on the same night as the 1963 Austral Wheel Race. The championships brought together Australia's best professional sprinters, including Ron Grenda, Barry Waddell, Sid Patterson and Dick Ploog. Grenda was the upset winner in the 1,000m sprint, after Barry Waddell was disqualified in the final. The 1963 championships also saw the emergence of Graeme Gilmore (racing as a junior), who later went on to win multiple local and international races

Event	Gold	Silver	Bronze
Senior Men
1,000m Sprint	Ron Grenda (Tas)	Barry Waddell (Vic)	Dick Ploog (Vic)
5,000m Individual Pursuit	John Perry (Vic)	Alex Fulcher (NSW)	Peter Panton (Vic)
5,000m Team Pursuit	Victoria (Sid Patterson, Barry Waddell, John Perry, Peter Panton)	Tasmania	New South Wales
1 Mile Scratch	Ron Grenda (Tas)	Charlie Smith (Vic)	Barry Waddell (Vic)
5 Mile Scratch	John Perry (Vic)	Ron Grenda (Tas)	Sid Patterson (Vic)
10 Mile Scratch	Barry Waddell (Vic)	Sid Patterson (Vic)	John Perry (Vic)
Junior Men
1,000m Sprint	Graeme Gilmore (Tas)	Marshall Summers (Qld)	Terry Lyons (W.A.)
1 Mile Scratch	E. Strudwick (W.A.)	Marshall Summers (Qld)	R. Glover (NSW)
5 Mile Scratch	Graeme Gilmore (Tas)	Terry Lyons (W.A.)	B. Rogers (S.A.)
2,000m Team Pursuit	Tasmania	Victoria	tbc

Rubina Joy Cup: Tasmania
