= Peter Thoeming =

Australian long-distance motorcycle rider (1947)

Joerg Richard Peter Thoeming, sometimes known as The Bear, is an Australian writer and photographer specialising in motorcycle travel and adventure writing. He has edited five motorcycle magazines and written several books on those and other topics. Thoeming has ridden a small motorcycle around the world (1977 – 1981) and ridden well over a million kilometres on six continents. For HEMA maps he wrote four editions of the Australia Motorcycle Atlas, and provided many of the photographs.

== Early life ==
Thoeming was born near Brunswick, Germany in 1947 before emigrating to Australia in 1959 with his parents. Naturalised in 1965, he studied economics at Sydney University (1965–1968) but left without taking his degree to begin a career as a graphic artist after designing university publications both at Sydney and New South Wales universities.. Thoeming used his middle name Peter from this time because Joerg was too difficult for English speakers to pronounce. In 1971 he became art director of the Australian Record Company, the Australian subsidiary of CBS Records. He designed many band logos and record covers.

== Motorcyclist ==
In 1978, Thoeming set out to ride a Honda XL250 around the world. He broke the journey to ride a Yamaha XS1100 through Europe, North Africa and Turkey. He then completed the original journey on the Honda through the US, returning in 1981. Along the way he contributed monthly articles to Two Wheels magazine and audio tapes to what was then ABC Radio 2JJ. At this time he acquired the nickname "The Bear".

Thoeming encouraged the creation of the Ulysses Club, Australia's largest motorcycle club with branches in several other countries. He designed the club logo.

== Writer & Editor ==
On his return to Australia, Thoeming wrote a book about the journey. He was also appointed editor of Two Wheels magazine. In 1982, he launched his own magazine, Bike Australia. He sold this in 1986 and built a career as a writer for business and government. Thoeming returned to motorcycle writing in 1990 to launch Australian Road Rider magazine. He subsequently launched Cruiser and Trike magazine for the same publisher before launching Australian Motorcyclist Magazine in 2013. This is now the only monthly general interest motorcycle magazine in Australia, with an emphasis on travel. He continues to travel by motorcycle, and write extensively for ADVrider.com, among other publications.

He has also written several company histories including one of the brewer Too-hey entitled Here's Too'ee, and edited The Great Australasian Beer Guide.

== Consultant ==
In 1985, Thoeming produced a report for Melbourne charity Harrison House, an agency of the Uniting Church, outlining the potential and procedures for training unemployed youths as motorcycle mechanics. As part of a year-long project for Australia Post, he redesigned the load-carrying system and delivery methods for motorcycle deliveries to improve safety. He also wrote Motorcycle Riders' Handbooks for VicRoads and the Roads and Traffic Authority of NSW. In 2007, he researched and prepared the draft of the City of Sydney's Motorcycle and Scooter Strategy and Action Plan.

== List of works ==
=== Books ===
- Motorcycle Touring JRP Thoeming and Peter Rae (London: Osprey Publishing, 1982. ISBN 9780850454369)
- The Wonderful World of Motorcycling JRP Thoeming, Writer and Editor (Sydney: Yaffa Publishing Group 1990)
- 200 Kilometres Around Sydney JRP Thoeming (Sydney: Gregory's Publishing Company, 1991. ISBN 0-7319-0390-0)
- The Australian Immigration Book JRP Thoeming (Sydney: Made to Measure Publications, 1996)
- Here’s Too’ee: The Story of Tooheys JRP Thoeming (Bathurst: Crawford House Publishing, 1997. ISBN 1-863331-38-7)
- Motorcycling in Australia JRP Thoeming (Sydney: Bear Face Books, 2001. ISBN 0 9586975-2-3)
- The Great Australia Gazetteer 3 Editions JRP Thoeming, contributor (Sydney: Focus Publishing. 2001, ISBN 187535988-5. 2002, ISBN 1 920683 19-4. 2003, ISBN 192068303-8)
- Creating a Better Future – The AMP Story JRP Thoeming with Marcella Hunter (Sydney: Focus Publishing, 2002. ISBN 1 875359 89 3)
- On the Road Again JRP Thoeming (Sydney: Bear Face Books, 2003. ISBN 0 9586975-3-1)
- Botany Mill – A Century of Paper from Botany Bay JRP Thoeming (Sydney, Bear Face Books, 2004. ISBN 0-9586975-8-2))
- Australia Motorcycle Atlas 4 Editions JRP Thoeming (Eight Mile Plains, Qld: Hema Maps Vol 2 to 5, 2005 – 2012. Vol 5 ISBN 978-1-86500-615-4)
- Superbrands JRP Thoeming, Writer and Editor (Sydney: Richardson & Young. Vol 3 ISBN 978-0957700017, Vol 4 ISBN 0957700024, Vol 5 ISBN 978-0-9577000-3-1)
- America’s Greatest Brands JRP Thoeming, Production Manager (Rye, New York: Superbrands International 2008. ISBN 0-9706860-0-5)
- Epic Drives of the World JRP Thoeming, contributor (London, Lonely Planet. ISBN 978-1-78657-864-8)
- Around the World JRP Thoeming, contributor (London: Lonely Planet, ISBN 9781788689373)

=== Magazines ===
- Two Wheels JRP Thoeming, Writer and Editor (Sydney: KG Murray Publishing, 1981)
- Bike Australia JRP Thoeming, Writer and Editor (Melbourne: AMCN, 1981 – 1984; Sydney: Yaffa Publishing, 1984 – 1988)
- The Great Australasian Beer Guide JRP Thoeming, Writer and Editor (Sydney: Federal Publishing, 1989 – 1993)
- Road Rider JRP Thoeming, Writer and Editor (Sydney: Universal Publishing, 1996 – 2013)
- Cruiser and Trike JRP Thoeming, Writer and Editor (Sydney: Universal Publishing, 2007 – 2013)
- Australian Motorcyclist JRP Thoeming, Writer and Editor (Sydney, Australian Motorcyclist Magazine, 2013 to present)

=== Online ===
- Adventure Rider JRP Thoeming, Associate Editor (USA: Adventure Rider, 2019 to present)
