= 1939 Australian Track Cycling Championships =

- Venue: Sydney, Australia
- Date: 25 February - 1 March 1939
- Velodrome: Sports Arena
- Events: 7

The 1939 Australian Track Cycling Championships were held on the board track at the Sydney Sports Arena from 25 February to 1 March 1939. This was the first time the Australian Championships were held at this track. The (amateur) championships coincided with a 'test match' between Australian and World cycling teams. The 1939 championships also doubled as trials for the 1940 Summer Olympics (which were later cancelled due to World War II).

Event	Gold	Silver	Bronze
1 Mile Scratch Race	Fred Ashby (Vic / Carnegie)	Bob Porter (NSW)	W. Beer
5 Mile Scratch Race	Bob Porter (NSW)	Fred Ashby (Vic / Carnegie)	TBC
10 Mile Scratch Race	Dunc Gray (NSW)	Alan Scott (NSW)	Fred Ashby (Vic / Carnegie)
1,000 Metres Sprint	Dunc Gray (NSW)	Fred Ashby (Vic / Carnegie)	TBC
1,000 Metre Time Trial	Dunc Gray (NSW)	Bob Porter (NSW)	Fred Ashby (Vic / Carnegie)
1 Mile Junior Championship (paced)	J. Walsh (NSW)	TBC	TBC
5 Mile Junior Scratch Race	J. Walsh (NSW)	TBC	TBC

Healing Shield Winners: New South Wales
