= Alan Gornall =

English retired cyclist

Personal information
- Born: 7 May 1960
- Died: Clitheroe, Lancashire, England
Medal record
Cycling
Representing England
Commonwealth Games
Gold medal – first place	1986 Edinburgh	team time trial

Alan J Gornall (born 1960), is an English retired cyclist.

== Cycling career ==
He represented England and competed in the road race and won a gold medal in the road team time trial with Deno Davie, Keith Reynolds and Paul Curran, at the 1986 Commonwealth Games in Edinburgh, Scotland.

He was a professional from 1987-1989.

== Personal life ==
His sister Linda Gornall was also an England international cyclist.
