= Ray Hicks (cyclist) =

British competitive cyclist (1917–1974)

Raymond Hicks
Personal information
- Born: 3 March 1917
- Died: 12 January 1974 (aged 56) Honiton, Devon, England

Cycling career
- Sport: Cycling
Medal record
Men's Cycling
Representing England
British Empire Games
Silver medal – second place	1938 Sydney	10 mile scratch

Raymond Hicks (3 March 1917 – 12 January 1974) was a British cyclist. He competed in the sprint and 1km track time trial events at the 1936 Summer Olympics.

== Cycling career ==
Hicks' first race of his cycling career took place at Chichester, Sussex, in March 1934, where he won a 1-mile handicapped race. Throughout the year, he earned victories in both one and half-mile events. The following year, Hicks earned the National Cyclists' Union London Centre and Southern Counties 1,000-metre sprint titles. In 1936, he was beaten by Dennis Horn during the NCU One Mile Grass Track Championship.

Hicks was selected for the sprint and 1 km track time trial at the 1936 Summer Olympics, finishing 7th in the latter. He competed in the sprint in the 1937 World Championships in Copenhagen, Denmark, the following year but was eliminated after a training accident the day before the event. He lost three nails off his heavily bandaged right hand and skin from one of his thighs and received ankle injuries.

Hicks also competed in the 1938 British Empire Games at Sydney, Australia, representing the English team, he won a silver medal behind William Maxfield in the 10-mile track scratch event.
