= Michael Hollingsworth (cyclist) =

Australian cyclist

Michael Hollingworth
Personal information
- Born: 16 October 1943 (age 82)
- Height: 170 cm (5 ft 7 in)
- Weight: 67 kg (148 lb)

Cycling career
- Sport: Cycling

Michael Hollingsworth (also Hollingworth, born 16 October 1943) is a former Australian road and track cyclist. Hollingworth competed in the individual road race at the 1964 Summer Olympics in Tokyo. He finished the race in 14th place, two places behind Eddy Merckx.

After the 1964 Olympics, Hollingsworth turned professional and competed in the Sun Tour six times and won several stages of the race.

Hollingsworth has been a member of Carnegie Caulfield Cycling Club since 1959. He has served as club president and currently coaches junior cyclists at the club.
