= 1940 Australian Track Cycling Championships =

Cycling Competition

- Venue: Brisbane, Australia
- Date(s): 9–11 March 1940
- Velodrome: Lang Park
- Events: 8

The 1940 Australian Track Cycling Championships were held at Lang Park Velodrome in Brisbane, Australia from March 9 to March 11, 1940. The titles were dominated by 18 year old Jack Welsh (NSW) who equalled a 26-year-old record by winning four out of 5 of the senior men's individual titles.

Event	Gold	Silver	Bronze
1 Mile Scratch Race	Jack Walsh (NSW)	Fred Ashby (Vic/Carnegie)	H. Clayton (Qld)
5 Mile Scratch Race	Jack Walsh (NSW)	Fred Ashby (Vic/Carnegie)	W. Doggett (Vic)
10 Mile Scratch Race	Jack Walsh (NSW)	Dunc Gray (NSW)	W. Doggett (Vic)
1,000 Metres Sprint	Jack Walsh (NSW)	N. Ballard (NSW)	H. Clayton (Qld)
1,000 Metre Time Trial	Dunc Gray (NSW)	N. Ballard (NSW)	Fred Ashby (Vic/Carnegie)
2 Mile Team Pursuit	Victoria (F. Ashby and ?)	xxx	xxx
1 Mile Junior Championship	C. Barclay (Vic)	A. Stewart (Qld)	J. Kohlenberg (NSW)
5 Mile Junior Scratch Race	J. Kohlenberg (NSW)	C. Barclay (Vic)	G. Goule (Vic)

Healing Shield Winners: NSW
