= Deno Davie =

English cyclist

Personal information
- Born: 22 May 1965 (age 61) Macclesfield, Cheshire, England
Medal record
Cycling
Representing England
Commonwealth Games
Gold medal – first place	1986 Edinburgh	team time trial

Deno M Davie (born 1965), is an English retired cyclist.

== Cycling career ==
He represented England and competed in the road race and won a gold medal in the road team time trial with Alan Gornall, Keith Reynolds and Paul Curran, at the 1986 Commonwealth Games in Edinburgh, Scotland.

He won one National Championship and was a professional from 1988-1991.
