= John Brown (cyclist) =

New Zealand cyclist

Personal information
- Born: 7 January 1916 Lesmahagow. Lanarkshire, Scotland
- Died: 12 April 1990 (aged 74)
- Spouse: Meryla Bruford Webb (m. 1939)

Sport
- Country: New Zealand
- Sport: Cycling
- Club: Manukau Amateur Cycling Club
Medal record
Representing New Zealand
Men's Cycling
British Empire Games
Silver medal – second place	1938 Sydney	Road Race

John Brown (7 January 1916 – 12 April 1990) was a New Zealand cyclist who won a silver medal at the 1938 British Empire Games.

== Biography ==
Born in Lesmahagow, Lanarkshire, Scotland, on 7 January 1916, Brown was the son of Elizabeth Pearson Stewart and her husband John Brown, a coalminer. After the family emigrated to New Zealand, Brown took up the sport of cycling in 1932 when he joined the Manukau Amateur Cycling Club in Auckland. He finished third in his first race, and second-fastest in his next race three weeks later. Less than two months after starting competitive junior cycling, Brown was riding off scratch and winning races. The following season, he joined the senior ranks.

In October 1934, Brown won the Auckland provincial 100-mile road-race championship, completing the 105-mile course from Papakura to Ngāruawāhia and back in a time of 5:10:38. In 1937, he recorded a race record time of 4:28:25 in winning the same event. Three weeks later, he won the North Island amateur 100-mile road title, riding the race from Palmerston North to Wellington in a time of 4:38:17.4.

In November 1937, Brown was selected as one of New Zealand's three representatives in the road race at the 1938 British Empire Games in Sydney. In that event, he finished second, half a wheel behind the gold medalist, Hennie Binneman of South Africa.

On 18 February 1939, Brown married Meryla Bruford Webb at St Peter's Anglican church, Onehunga. The couple went on to have two children.

Brown died on 12 April 1990.
