= Reg Braddick =

Welsh cyclist

Personal information
- Born: 4 August 1913 Cardiff, Wales
- Died: December 1999

Cycling career
- Sport: Cycling
- Disciplines: Road & Track
- Role: Rider

Professional teams
- 1930au: Cardiff 100 Miles Road Club
- Cardiff Ajax CC

Major wins
- (United Kingdom) British Champion

Reginald Kenneth Braddick (4 August 1913 – December 1999) was a Welsh racing cyclist from Cardiff, Wales.

== Biography ==
Braddick's interest in cycling started as a butcher's delivery boy in Cardiff.

In 1938 he represented Wales at the 1938 British Empire Games in Sydney, Australia, reaching the final of the 10 mile scratch race.

He won the 1944 NCU national road championship and the following year he opened Reg Braddick Cycles on Broadway, Roath, Cardiff, in 1945 and had the idea of starting Cardiff Ajax Cycling Club in the flat above the shop. Riders who started with the club include Sally Hodge and Nicole Cooke. The shop was run by his son David, daughter-in-law, Janet and granddaughter, Suzy.

== Palmarès ==
1944
1st (United Kingdom) British National Road Race Championships – NCU
