= Guy Rowland =

Personal information
- Nationality: England
- Born: 1964 (age 61–62) London
Medal record
Cycling
Representing England
Commonwealth Games
Bronze medal – third place	1986 Edinburgh	team pursuit

Guy Rowland (born 1964) is a male retired cyclist who competed for England.

== Cycling career ==
He represented England and won a bronze medal in the 4,000 metres team pursuit event, with Chris Boardman, Rob Muzio, Gary Coltman and Jon Walshaw, at the 1986 Commonwealth Games in Edinburgh, Scotland.

He won two National Championships.
