= Carnegie Caulfield Cycling Club =

Australian cycling club

- Type: Cycling club
- Members: ~500
- President: Linda Hunter
- Website: www.carnegiecycling.com.au

Carnegie Caulfield Cycling Club is an Australian cycling club based in the eastern suburbs of Melbourne. Established in the early 1900s, it has a long history of road, criterium and track racing. Carnegie-Caufield riders have won multiple cycling premierships at both senior and junior level. Its members have additionally gone on to win multiple national and world championships as well as participate at the Olympics.

== History ==
Originally known as the Carnegie Amateur Cycling Club, the history of the club dates back over 100 years. Early races were typically handicap races over 10–60-mile road courses, often starting at the Rosstown Hotel before making their way along Dandenong Road.

The club also played a significant role in the local community, in particular through its support for the Oakleigh Carnival. Around this time, the club formalised the first incarnation of its junior program recorded in 1931 after early success in the Victoria Club Premierships. The Carnegie senior team concurrently won major races.

During the 1950s, Carnegie track racing, held at its local track Packer Park, drew crowds of up to 4,000 spectators who observed what were considered some of Australia’s best amateur and professional riders at the time. The quality of Carnegie's track racing was a key driver behind the push by the NSW Cycling Union to move the 1956 Melbourne Olympics track cycling programme to the Carnegie velodrome after delays in the resurfacing of the Olympic Park Velodrome. Although the push did not succeed, subsequent issues with the Olympic track created a second push to move a later event, the Australian Titles, to the Carnegie Velodrome.

Club logo circa 1980

Carnegie's track racing program became even more popular during the 1960s and 1970s with the Caulfield Cup on Wheels, becoming the leading race for amateur cyclists in Melbourne. The event was often held on the same night as the Melbourne Cup on Wheels, an equivalent race for professional cyclists.

In 1984, Carnegie Amateurs Cycling Club merged with Brighton-South Caulfield Professional Cyclists Association to form Carnegie Caulfield Cycling Club.

More recently, the club's summer criterium racing has increased in popularity, attracting some of the best riders in the world. Club racing is regularly covered in leading cycling publications.

== Racing ==
The club hosts a range of races over the course of the year. In summer, criterium races are held on Sunday mornings at Glenvale Crescent and Tuesday evenings at Sandown Raceway. The club also holds track racing and training during summer. Over winter, the club runs longer road races east of Melbourne.

=== Criterium racing ===
Between October and April each summer, Carnegie Caulfield holds weekly criterium races on Sunday mornings at Glenvale Crescent, Mulgrave and on Tuesday evenings at Sandown Raceway. Races are typically between 45 and 60 minutes and are conducted on circuits with little to no vehicle traffic. Racing caters for all levels of riders, from elite male and female professionals to juniors and novice riders. Over 300 riders often attend a day's racing. At the elite end, A Grade has hosted some of the world's best riders, including:

- Tour de France yellow jersey winner, and UCI World Road Race Champion Cadel Evans
- Tour de France yellow jersey winner, Olympic Gold Medallist, UCI World Pursuit Champion and World Hour Record Holder Sir Bradley Wiggins
- Tour de France green jersey winner Baden Cooke
- Vuelta a Espana King of the Mountains winner Simon Clarke
- Giro d'Italia King of the Mountains winner Matt Lloyd
- Milan–San Remo and Liège–Bastogne–Liège winner Simon Gerrans

Glenvale Crescent has also hosted some of the world's leading female riders, including:

- Olympic Road Race Gold Medallist, UCI World Road Race Champion, Nicole Cooke
- Olympic Road Race Gold Medallist, Elizabeth Tadich
- Olympic Road Race Gold Medallist, Kathy Watt
- World Individual Pursuit Champion, Katie Mactier
- Two-time winner of UCI World Cup Anna Millward

For most of the season, women race alongside men, with prizes paid for the first 3 women across the line in each grade. Prizes can expand to more racers depending on the number of total participants. There are also 2–3 women's only races held over the course of the summer criterium racing season.

The club also conducts a cycling clinic for junior riders at both Glendale Crescent and Sandown each week. Riders are taught bunch riding and racing skills by Tokyo Olympian Mick Hollingworth.

Race entries are accepted on the day.

Carnegie Caulfield's summer criterium are internationally renowned.

Multiple independent websites provided advice to new riders looking to get into racing with Carnegie Caulfield

=== Track racing ===
Carnegie Caulfield offers track racing for riders of all levels. The club has also received significant support from state and federal government, most recently in relation to installing new flood lighting

=== Winter road racing ===
Over winter, Carnegie Caulfield holds mass start and handicap races east of Melbourne. Races are typically between 80 km and 100 km. The club also holds a major race at Phillip Island Grand Prix Circuit each year in May.

== Elite team ==
Carnegie Caulfield's elite team has had a successful history over several decades. The team has raced at high-profile events such as the Bay Classic Series. More recently, the club entered a team in the Victoria Racing Series. The 2015 team was composed of

- Jack Hickey
- Adam Mulford
- Stefan Imberger
- Alex Holden
- Matthew Bennett
- Simon Frost
- Jakey Klajnblat

== Junior development program ==
The club also offers a comprehensive training program for junior riders. The program, coached by Olympian Hilton Clarke Snr., has produced over 15 world and over 100 national champions. Several riders have gone on to have a successful careers on the World Tour Cycling circuit.

== Awards ==
Carnegie Caulfield has been awarded the Australian Club Premiership by Cycling Australia 7 times in the last 10 years

== Club members ==
=== Olympians and Paralympians ===
Club riders have represented Australia at 13 Olympic and Paralympics Games

1956 – Melbourne
41st, Individual Road Race – John O'Sullivan

1964 – Tokyo
14th, Individual Road Race – Mick Hollingworth
Qtr Finals, Tandem – Daryl Perkins

1968 – Mexico City
14th, 1000m Time Trial – Hilton Clarke
10th, Tandem – Hilton Clarke

1984 – Los Angeles
14th, 1000m Time Trial – Max Rainsford
Repechage, Sprint – Max Rainsford
DNF, Individual Road Race – Gary Trowell

1998 – Calgary
14th, 1,500m Speed Skating – Danny Kah
10th, 5,000m Speed Skating – Danny Kah

1992 – Barcelona
12th, Team Time Trial – Robert Crowe

1992 – Albertville
34th, 1,000m Speed Skating – Danny Kah
23rd, 1,500m Speed Skating – Danny Kah
20th, 5,000m Speed Skating – Danny Kah
12th, 10,000m Speed Skating – Danny Kah

1994 – Lillehammer
25th, 1,500m Speed Skating – Danny Kah
25th, 5,000m Speed Skating – Danny Kah

1996 – Atlanta
Individual Road Race (CP4) – Peter Homann
Individual Time Trial (CP4) – Peter Homann
Omnium (LC2) – Paul Lake
17th, Individual Road Race – Anna Millward
10th, Individual Time Trial – Anna Millward
Semi-final, 5,000m (Athletics) – Julian Paynter

2000 – Sydney
Individual Road Race (CP4) – Peter Homann
Team Sprint (LC1-3) – Paul Lake
3,000m Individual Pursuit (LC2) – Paul Lake
Individual Time Trial (CP4) – Peter Homann
1,000m Individual Time Trial (LC2) – Paul Lake

2004 – Athens
Team Sprint (CP3-4) – Peter Homann
3,000m Individual Pursuit – Katie Mactier
Individual Road Race / Time Trial (CP Div 4) – Peter Homann
3,000m Individual Pursuit (CP Div 4) – Peter Homann

2008 – Beijing
3,000m Individual Pursuit LC1- Michael Gallagher
Individual Road Race LC1 – Michael Gallagher
7th, 3,000m Individual Pursuit – Katie Mactier
4th, Team Sprint – Mark French
Repechage, Sprint – Mark French

2012 – London
3,000m Individual Pursuit C5- Michael Gallagher
Individual Time Trial C5 – Michael Gallagher
Sprint – Shane Perkins
4th, Team Sprint – Shane Perkins

=== World Champions ===
Carnegie Caulfield riders have won 15 World Championships since 1988.

1988
Sprint (Pro) – Stephen Pate

2001
Sprint (U/19) – Mark French
Team Sprint (U/19) – Mark French

2004
Sprint (U/19) – Shane Perkins
4km Team Pursuit (U/19) – Simon Clarke
4 km Individual Pursuit (U/19) – Michael Ford
4 km Team Pursuit (U/19) – Michael Ford

2009
500m Time Trial (Masters 60–64) – John Hunt

2011
Kieren – Shane Perkins
4km Team Pursuit (U/19) – Jack Cummings

2012
Team Sprint – Shane Perkins
Sprint (U/19) – Jacob Schmid
Kieren (U/19) – Jacob Schmid
4km Team Pursuit (U/19) – Jack Cummings

2014
Sprint (U/19) – Courtney Field

2015
4km Team Pursuit (U/19) – James Tickner

=== National Champions ===
Club members have won over 100 Australian Champions

1938
10 Mile Scratch Race (Amateur) – Fred Ashby

1939
1 Mile Scratch Race (Amateur) – Fred Ashby

1940
2-mile Team Pursuit (Amateur) – Fred Ashby

1962
Tandem (Amateur) – Bill Bowker

1963
4km Team Pursuit (Amateur) – Paul Bowker

1966
1000m Time Trial (Amateur) – Hilton Clarke Snr.
4km Team Pursuit (Amateur) – Hilton Clarke Snr.

1967
1000m Time Trial (Amateur) – Hilton Clarke Snr.
10-mile Scratch Race (Amateur) – Hilton Clarke Snr.
4km Team Pursuit (Amateur) – Hilton Clarke Snr.

1968
1000m Time Trial (Amateur) – Hilton Clarke Snr.
4km Team Pursuit (Amateur) – Hilton Clarke Snr.

1969
4km Team Pursuit (Pro) – Hilton Clarke Snr.

1970
1 mile Scratch Race (Pro) – Hilton Clarke Snr.
5-mile Scratch Race (Pro) – Hilton Clarke Snr.

1971
5-mile Scratch Race (Pro) – Hilton Clarke Snr.

1972
5-mile Scratch Race (Pro) – Hilton Clarke Snr.

1974
1000m Time Trial (Pro) – Hilton Clarke Snr.
Madison (Pro) – Hilton Clarke Snr.

1975
4km Team Pursuit (Pro) – Hilton Clarke Snr.

1976
10km Scratch Race (Pro) – Hilton Clarke Snr.
4km Team Pursuit (Pro) – Hilton Clarke Snr.

1983
1000m Time Trial – Max Rainsford

1984
1000m Time Trial – Max Rainsford
20km Scratch Race (Amateur) – Stephen Pate

1985
20km Scratch Race (Amateur) – Stephen Pate
1000m Time Trial (U/19) – Darren King
4km Pursuit – Randall McGregor

1986
20km Scratch Race (Amateur) – Stephen Pate

1986
Sprint (Pro) – Stephen Pate
Keiren (Pro) – Stephen Pate
20km Scratch Race (Pro) – Stephen Pate

1987
4km Team Pursuit (Pro) – Stephen Pate

1988
Sprint (Pro) – Stephen Pate
Keirin (Pro) – Stephen Pate
20km Scratch Race (Pro) – Stephen Pate
1 Mile Scratch Race (Pro) – Stephen Pate

1989
Sprint (Pro) – Stephen Pate
Keirin (Pro) – Stephen Pate
1 Mile Scratch Race (Pro) – Stephen Pate
20km Scratch Race (Pro) – Stephen Pate
4km Team Pursuit (Pro) – Stephen Pate

1990
Sprint (Pro) – Stephen Pate
Keirin (Pro) – Stephen Pate
1 Mile Scratch Race (Pro) – Stephen Pate
Elimination (Pro) – Stephen Pate

1991
Keirin (Pro) – Stephen Pate
1 Mile Scratch Race (Pro) – Stephen Pate
20km Scratch Race (Pro) – Stephen Pate
Elimination (Pro) – Stephen Pate
4km Team Pursuit (Pro) – Stephen Pate

1992
Keirin (Pro) – Stephen Pate

1993
Sprint (Pro) – Stephen Pate
Keirin (Pro) – Stephen Pate
1km Scratch Race (Pro) – Stephen Pate
20km Scratch Race (Pro) – Stephen Pate
Elimination (Pro) – Stephen Pate
4km Team Pursuit (Pro) – Stephen Pate

1995
20km Scratch Race – Stephen Pate
Keiren – Stephen Pate

1996
40km Points Score – Stephen Pate
Madison – Stephen Pate

1997
Criterium – Stephen Pate
Madison – Stephen Pate

1998
Madison – Stephen Pate

2000
Madison – Stephen Pate
500m Time Trial (U/17) – Mark French
10km Scratch Race (U/17) – Mark French
Flying 200m Time Trial (U/15) – Shane Perkins
500m Time Trial (U/15) – Shane Perkins
Sprint (U/15) – Shane Perkins
10km Scratch Race (U/15) – Michael Ford
Road Race (U/15) – Michael Ford
Criterium (U/15) – Michael Ford

2001
Road Time Trial – Kristjan Snorrason
Flying 200m Time Trial (U/19) – Mark French
1000m Time Trial (U/19) – Mark French
Sprint (U/19) – Mark French
Kierin (U/19) – Mark French
Flying 200m Time Trial (U/17) – Shane Perkins
Sprint (U/17) – Shane Perkins

2002
3km Team Pursuit (U/17) – Simon Clarke
Flying 200m Time Trial (U/19) – Mark French
1000m Time Trial (U/19) – Mark French
Sprint (U/19) – Mark French
Kierin (U/19) – Mark French
Flying 200m Time Trial (U/17) – Shane Perkins
500m Time Trial (U/17) – Shane Perkins
4km Team Pursuit (U/19) – Jonny Clarke

2003
4km Team Pursuit (U/19) – Simon Clarke
Flying 200m Time Trial (U/19) – Shane Perkins
1000m Time Trial (U/19) – Shane Perkins
Sprint (U/19) – Shane Perkins
Madison (U/19) – Michael Ford

2004
Flying 200m Time Trial (U/19) – Shane Perkins
Sprint (U/19) – Shane Perkins
4km Team Pursuit (U/19) – Simon Clarke
4km Individual Pursuit (U/19) – Michael Ford
4km Team Pursuit (U/19) – Michael Ford
Madison (U/19) – Michael Ford

2007
4km Team Pursuit – Michael Ford

2010
2km Individual Pursuit (U/15) – Jack Hickey
Hill Climb (U/15) – Courtney Field
Sprint (U/15) – Courtney Field
500m Time Trial (U/15) – Courtney Field
2km Individual Pursuit (U/17) – Jack Cummings
2km Team Pursuit (U/17) – Jack Cummings / Evan Hull / Tom Hamilton
750m Team Sprint (U/17) – Jack Cummings / Evan Hull
10km Scratch Race (U/17) – Evan Hull

2011
Hill Climb (U/15) – Courtney Field
Sprint (U/15) – Courtney Field
500m Time Trial (U/15) – Courtney Field
Scratch Race (U/15) – Courtney Field
Road Race (U/15) – Courtney Field
Criterium (U/15) – Courtney Field
3km Team Pursuit (U/17) – Jack Hickey
3km Team Pursuit (U/17) – Matt Ross
500m Time Trial (U/17) – Ruby Greig
500m Time Trial (U/19) – Adele Sylvester
Sprint (U/19) – Adele Sylvester

2012
Sprint (U/17) – Courtney Field
500m Time Trial (U/17) – Courtney Field
Team Sprint (U/17) – Courtney Field
Sprint (U/19) – Jacob Schmid
Kieren (U/19) – Jacob Schmid

2013
Cyclo-cross – Lisa Jacob
Sprint (U/17) – Courtney Field
Team Sprint (U/17) – Courtney Field
Scratch Race (U/17) – Courtney Field
500m Time Trial (U/17) – Courtney Field
Criterium (U/15) – Alana Field

2014
Cyclo-cross – Lisa Jacob
Sprint (U/19) – Courtney Field
Team Sprint (U/19) – Courtney Field
Kieren (U/19) – Courtney Field
2km Individual Pursuit (U/15) – Georgia Cummings
Points Race (U/15) – Georgia Cummings
3km Team Pursuit (U/17) – Ryan Koroknai
2km Team Pursuit (U/17) – Alana Field
Team Sprint (U/19) – David Koroknai

2015
Cyclo-cross – Lisa Jacob

=== Club champions ===
1999
Road, Elite Men – Kristjan Snorrason

2000
Track, Elite Men – Nick Groves
Road, Elite Men – Kristjan Snorrason

2001
Road, Elite Men – Kristjan Snorrason

2013
Road, Elite Men – Trent Morey

2014
Road, Elite Men – Tim Jamieson
Road, Elite Women – Amber Saunders

2015 Road, Elite Men – Adam Mulford
