= Alastair Irvine =

Northern Irish cyclist

Personal information
- Nationality: British (Northern Irish)
- Born: c.1961 Northern Ireland

Sport
- Sport: Cycling
- Event: Road
- Club: North Down CC
Medal record
Representing Northern Ireland
Commonwealth Games
Bronze medal – third place	1986 Edinburgh	Road team time trial
Bronze medal – third place	1990 Auckland	Points race

Alastair Irvine (born c.1961) is a former cyclist from Northern Ireland, who competed at two Commonwealth Games and won a bronze medal.

== Biography ==
Irvine represented the Northern Ireland Cycling Federation and rode for the Toyota North Down team. He was the 1981 Cyclo-Cross champion of Ireland and the 1986 100km champion of Ireland at the Irish National Cycling Championships.

Irvine represented Northern Ireland at the 1986 Commonwealth Games in the team time trial event, winning a bronze medal with Cormac McCann, Joe Barr and Martin Quinn. Four year later he won a bronze medal in the points race at the 1990 Commonwealth Games.

Irvine lived in Mallorca for 20 years and worked for the Sunsport Coaching company, leading cycling groups on the island.
