= Martin Quinn (cyclist) =

Northern Irish cyclist

Personal information
- Nationality: British (Northern Irish)
- Born: c.1964 Northern Ireland

Sport
- Sport: Cycling
- Event: Road
- Club: Cyprus CC
Medal record
Representing Northern Ireland
Commonwealth Games
Bronze medal – third place	1986 Edinburgh	Road team time trial

Martin Quinn (born c.1964) is a former cyclist from Northern Ireland, who competed at the Commonwealth Games and won a bronze medal.

== Biography ==
Quinn was from Carrickfergus and was a member of the King's Moss Cycling Club before joining the Cyprus Cycling Club. Quinn was the 1982 and 1983 time trial champion of Ireland at the Irish National Cycling Championships.

Quinn represented Northern Ireland at the 1986 Commonwealth Games in the team time trial event, winning a bronze medal with Alastair Irvine, Cormac McCann and Joe Barr.
