= Ray Jones (cyclist) =

English cyclist (1918–1990)

Personal information
- Nationality: British (English)
- Born: 14 February 1918
- Died: July 1990 (aged 72)

Sport
- Sport: Cycling
- Club: Wolverhampton Wheelers
Medal record
Men's Cycling
Representing England
British Empire Games
| Bronze medal – third place | 1938 Sydney | Road time trial |

Raymond Colin Jones (14 February 1918 – July 1990) was an English road cyclist.

== Biography ==
He was born in Birmingham, England and went to school in Wolverhampton. He rode for Wolverhampton Wheelers.

He started racing in 1936, having two Olympic trials that year and at the 1937 world championship he finished fifth, and 12th at the 1938 championship. In the same years he finished second in the Isle of Man time trial.

In 1938, he came third in the road race at the British Empire Games and therefore secured the bronze medal.

At the time of the 1938 Games he was a carpenter. He joined the Royal Air Force in February 1940 and was demobilized in 1945.
