= Rob Muzio =

English cyclist (born 1965)

Personal information
- Born: 17 February 1965 (age 61) Leicester, England
Medal record
Cycling
Representing England
Commonwealth Games
Bronze medal – third place	1986 Edinburgh	team pursuit

Robert 'Rob' Muzio (born 1965), is an English retired cyclist.

== Cycling career ==
He represented England and competed in the 4,000 metres individual pursuit and won a bronze medal in the 4,000 metres team pursuit event, with Chris Boardman, Gary Coltman, Adrian Adgar and Jon Walshaw, at the 1986 Commonwealth Games in Edinburgh, Scotland.

He was a professional from 1987-1988.
