= Joe Barr (cyclist) =

Northern Irish cyclist

Personal information
- Nationality: British (Northern Irish)
- Born: 13 June 1959 Derry, Northern Ireland

Sport
- Sport: Cycling
- Event: Road
- Club: Cyprus CC
Medal record
Representing Northern Ireland
Commonwealth Games
cycling
| Bronze medal – third place | 1986 Edinburgh | Road team time trial |

Joseph Barr (born 13 June 1959) is a former cyclist from Northern Ireland, who competed at the Commonwealth Games and won a bronze medal.

== Biography ==
Barr was a member of the Cyprus Cycling Club and won the 1986 Northern Ireland road race championship. and finished third at the 1985 Irish National Cycling Championships road race.

Barr represented Northern Ireland at the 1986 Commonwealth Games in the team time trial event, winning a bronze medal with Alastair Irvine, Cormac McCann and Martin Quinn.
