= Ulysses Club =

Australian motorcycle club

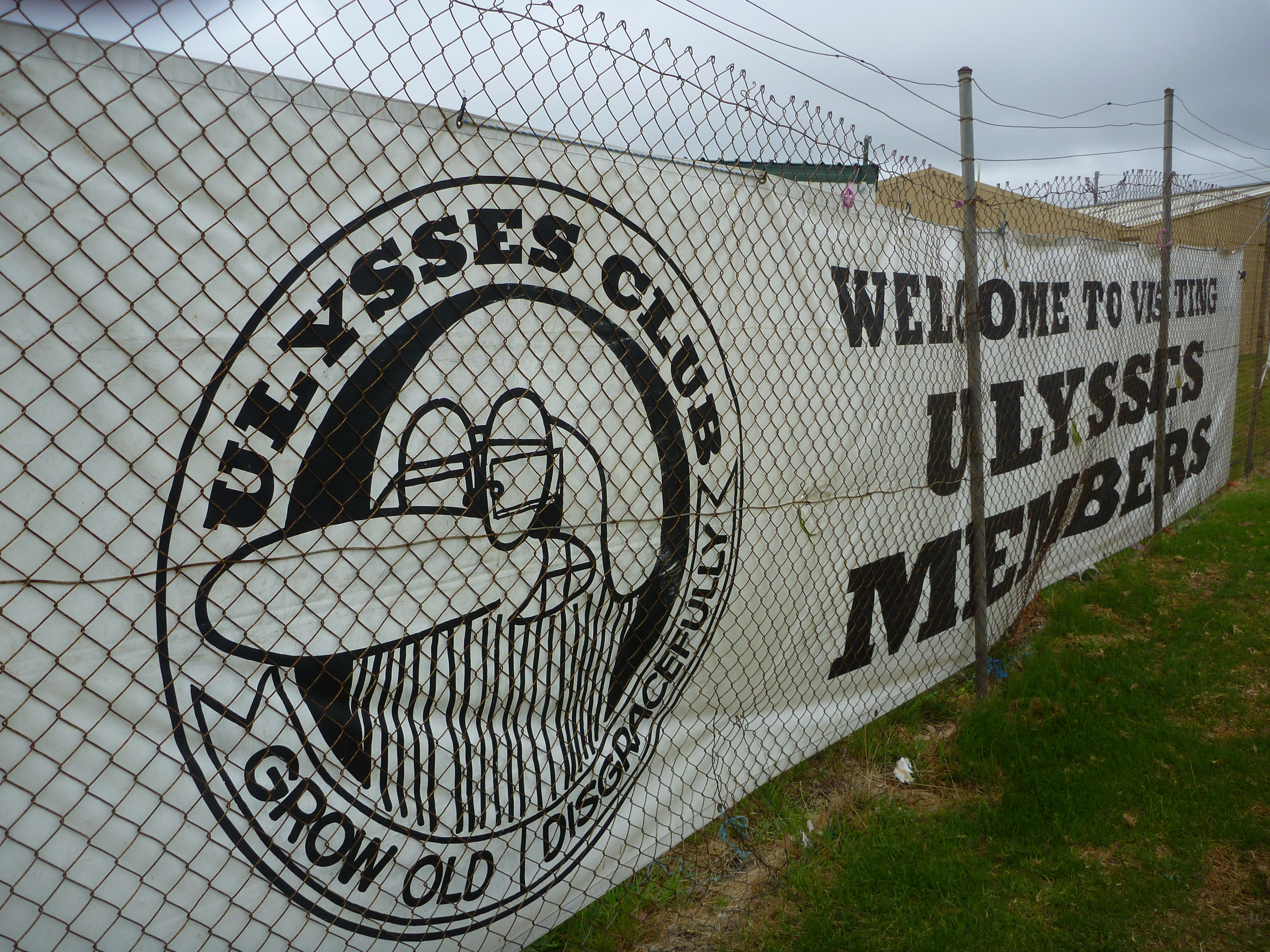
Annual General Meeting Banner, Albany 2010

The Ulysses Club is a club for motorcyclists over age 40 in Australia. A sibling organisation of the same name exists in New Zealand.

== History ==
The Ulysses Club was formed for motorcyclists aged 40 years and older at the instigation of Stephen Dearnley in Sydney, Australia in December 1983 in reply to a letter in the now defunct Bike Australia magazine, the editor being Peter "The Bear" Thoeming. The name Ulysses Club was the idea of Rob Hall, while the club's motto of "Grow Old Disgracefully" was devised by his then-girlfriend Pat Lynch. Peter "The Bear" Thoeming sketched the "old man" logo that is still used by the club in its original hand-sketched form. The inaugural meeting of the club was held in Sydney on 6 December 1983 when the five people present approved a draft constitution and the Ulysses Club was duly formed. From this meeting a draft constitution was adopted, and the three basic principles or purposes of the club were formulated. These principles are:

1. To provide ways in which older motorcyclists can get together for companionship and mutual support;
2. To show by example that motor cycling can be an enjoyable and practical activity for riders of all ages;
3. To draw the attention of public and private institutions to the needs and views of older riders.

These original purposes are entrenched in the club's constitutions and have remained unchanged. At that initial meeting the five founding members became an interim management committee, until two months later, on 7 February 1984, 11 of the club's total membership of 25 members attended the club's first annual general meeting, formally electing the very first National Committee and adopting the club's constitution.

The name comes from Ulysses by Alfred, Lord Tennyson. It tells how the great Greek hero Ulysses, now middle-aged and securely in charge of his kingdom of Ithaca, is getting bored with things around him and longs to go adventuring again with his shipmates of old. It describes very well indeed the sort of person who still has enough spark to go on riding into middle and later years.

It is the largest organisation of its kind with over 138 branches in Australia and it now has branches in Germany, Vietnam (2008), South Africa (1997), Norway, Zimbabwe, the Netherlands, Switzerland, France, Great Britain and Cuba, with external members of the Australian club in Italy, Papua New Guinea, Singapore, Fiji, China, Austria, Thailand and the United States.

Membership of the club is open to any person, subject to National Committee approval, who has attained the age of 40 years and who holds a current motorcycle licence. Additionally, the spouse or regular companion of a member, who has attained the age of 40 years, may also be admitted as a member on application.

Membership now stands around 16,000.

== New Zealand ==
A number of New Zealanders joined the Ulysses Club in the 1980s, creating an informal "New Zealand branch" with about 100 members, but the cost of administering members across the Tasman and sending them the newsletter cost the club more than the membership fees, so in 1988 the Secretary Pete Reynolds visited members in Hawkes Bay and Invercargill and encouraged them to form a New Zealand organisation. By the end of 1988, the New Zealand Ulysses Club had a membership of 360.

By early 2013, the club had 3000 current members in 29 branches.

== Annual general meeting ==
The club's annual general meeting (AGM) is held each year between 1 January and 30 June. The purpose of the AGM is to affirm minutes of the previous meeting, receive reports, consider the financial statements for the year ending 31 December previous and to elect office bearers.

== Ulysses Club National Rally ==
Each year the Ulysses Club National Rally is held in a different location throughout Australia. The locations of the Ulysses Club National Rally are chosen by the National Committee and ratified by the Extended NatCom meeting, usually three years prior to the event being held. The Ulysses Club National Rally event has formal fixtures running for four days of the event, namely the Road Safety Forum on the Thursday, the Extended NatCom meeting held on the Friday, the Grand Parade and Opening / Civic Ceremony on the Saturday morning and the AGM itself on the Saturday afternoon. These are followed by the Saturday night dinner and the Sunday morning church service, and finally the closing ceremony after the church service. Additional to these fixtures, trade displays, bike test rides, organised rides, and social gatherings have been included in past events by the host committee, starting as early as the Monday preceding the actual meeting weekend, for the benefit and entertainment of visiting members.

In 2009 the Annual General Meeting was held in Penrith, New South Wales and attracted some 3,500 members to the city. Albany, Western Australia was the scene of the 2010 Annual General Meeting and club members camped at Centennial Oval for the week of the event. Approximately 3200 members attended the event.

The 2011 annual general meeting was held in Newcastle, New South Wales with about 3,000 members participating in the parade through town prior to the meeting commencing. In 2012 Mildura was selected as the venue for the event with approximately 4,000 members attending and contributing between A$5 to 10 million to the local economy.
