= Ernie Crutchlow =

British cyclist (born 1948)

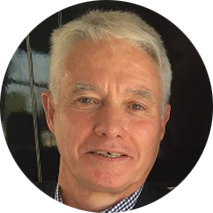

Personal information
- Born: 6 November 1948 (age 77) Nuneaton, Warwickshire, England
- Height: 5 ft 9 in (175 cm)
- Weight: 70 kg (154 lb)

Cycling career
- Sport: Cycling

Amateur team
- Coventry C.C.
Medal record
Cycling
Representing England
British Commonwealth Games
Gold medal – first place	1974 Christchurch	tandem

Ernest Edward Crutchlow (born 6 November 1948) is a British former international cyclist.

== Biography ==
Crutchlow competed in the sprint event at the 1972 Summer Olympics.

He represented England in the 1,000 metres match sprint, at the 1970 British Commonwealth Games in Edinburgh, Scotland. Four years later he competed in the match sprint once again and the tandem (in which he won a gold medal) at the 1974 British Commonwealth Games in Christchurch, New Zealand.

He was the British National sprint champion in 1970, 1971, 1972 and 1973 (amateurs) and 1980 (profs).And he was also the British National tandem sprint champion in 1973 and 1974 (amateurs). Crutchlow also won the City of Manchester Grand Prix in 1973.
