= René Heyde =

New Zealand cyclist (born 1954)

Personal information
- Born: 1954 (age 71–72)

Sport
- Sport: Track cycling
Medal record
Representing New Zealand
Men's track cycling
British Commonwealth Games
Bronze medal – third place	1974 Christchurch	Team pursuit

René Marcel Gerald Anthony Heyde (born 1954) is a New Zealand former track cyclist. After a difficult time as a youth, he started track cycling in 1971 and only narrowly missed going to the Munich Olympics the following year. He won a bronze medal at the 1974 British Commonwealth Games in his home town, Christchurch.

== Early life ==
Heyde was born in 1954 and grew up in Christchurch, where he had a difficult childhood. His parents split when he was young. Aged 9, he and his two younger brothers stayed at the Christchurch respite centre. Aged 10, the brothers were uplifted from his father by police, to be cared for in welfare homes for the next four years. Heyde went to 14 different schools before he dropped out.

== Cycling career ==
While he was at Christchurch Boys' High School, Heyde was stroke for their rowing eight. He competed in road cycling in 1970 but did not make an impression. While in Year 12, he started track cycling on 23 January 1971 and within four weeks, he managed to win Canterbury championship medals. Heyde was in contention for the New Zealand track cycling team for the 1972 Summer Olympics. Four of the five competitors had been chosen already at trials in Christchurch, and Heyde was invited to the final trials on 18 March 1972 in Wanganui the following weekend. As Heyde had crashed at the Christchurch trials and was injured, Neil Lyster received a last-minute invitation although Heyde had outperformed him in Christchurch. Whilst Heyde did ride in Wanganui and Lyster did not, Lyster was chosen ahead of Heyde to join the Olympic team.

Heyde won the 1973 national championship in 4,000 metres (2.5 mi) individual pursuit. At the 1974 British Commonwealth Games in Christchurch, he won the bronze medal in the men's 4000 m team pursuit, alongside Paul Brydon, Russell Nant and Blair Stockwell. At those games, he also competed in the men's 1 km time trial, recording a time of 1:12.16 to finish fourth, 0.01 s behind the bronze medallist, Ian Hallam.

By 1975, Heyde had switched from cycling to road running.

== Later life ==
In later life, Heyde was a community work supervisor. At age 70, Heyde stated that the child trauma of an uncertain future has never left him, and he expects the dread will always stay with him.

From 1 August 2024, Heyde is planning to ride 4,000 kilometres (2,500 mi) from Perth to Geelong as a fundraiser for the Cholmondeley Children's Centre.
