= Cormac McCann =

Northern Irish cyclist

Personal information
- Born: 8 February 1964 (age 62) Belfast, Northern ireland
- Height: 178 cm (5 ft 10 in)
- Weight: 70 kg (154 lb)

Sport
- Event: Road
- Club: Phoenix CC
Medal record
Representing Northern Ireland
Commonwealth Games
Bronze medal – third place	1986 Edinburgh	Road team time trial

Cormac McCann (born 8 February 1964) is a former cyclist from Northern Ireland, who competed at the 1988 Summer Olympics for Ireland.

== Biography ==
McCann was a member of the Phoenix Cycling Club.

McCann represented Northern Ireland at the 1986 Commonwealth Games in the team time trial event, winning a bronze medal with Alastair Irvine, Joe Barr and Martin Quinn.

At the 1988 Olympic Games in Seoul, he participated in the road race and the 100 km team time trial.
