= Rik Evans =

British cyclist

Personal information
- Nationality: United Kingdom
- Born: 29 May 1954 (age 72) Bromley

Sport
- Sport: Track Cycling
Medal record
Track Cycling
Representing (United Kingdom) Great Britain
UCI Track Cycling World Championships
Silver medal – second place	1973 San Sebastián	team pursuit
Representing England
Commonwealth Games
Gold medal – first place	1974 Christchurch	team pursuit

Richard 'Rik' Evans (born 1954), is a male retired cyclist who competed for Great Britain and England.

== Cycling career ==
Evans represented Great Britain in the 1973 UCI Track Cycling World Championships winning a silver medal in the team pursuit.

He represented England and won a gold medal in the team pursuit event, at the 1974 British Commonwealth Games in Christchurch, New Zealand. He rode for London and was the 1977 National team pursuit champion.
