= Russell Nant =

New Zealand cyclist (born 1952)

Personal information
- Born: Russell David Nant; 1952 (age 73–74) Palmerston North, New Zealand

Sport
- Country: New Zealand
- Sport: Track cycling
Medal record
Representing New Zealand
Men's track cycling
British Commonwealth Games
Bronze medal – third place	1974 Christchurch	Team pursuit

Russell David Nant (born 1952) is a New Zealand road and track cyclist.

Nant was born in Palmerston North in 1952. He won the bronze medal in the men's 4000 m team pursuit, alongside Paul Brydon, René Heyde and Blair Stockwell, at the 1974 British Commonwealth Games in Christchurch. At those games, he also competed in the men's 4000 m individual pursuit, but did not progress beyond the qualification round.

In 1978, Nant won two stages of the Herald Sun Tour of Victoria in Australia. The following year, he won the sprint ace title in the Tour of Southland.

At the 2005 New Zealand national championships, Nant placed fourth in the veteran 4 / athletes with disabilities men's 70 km road race. In 2009, he won the men's 55–59 division of the Yarrows Cycle Challenge in New Plymouth.
