= Jon Walshaw =

English cyclist

Personal information
- Born: 21 March 1967 (age 59) Howden, East Riding of Yorkshire, England
Medal record
Cycling
Representing England
Commonwealth Games
Bronze medal – third place	1986 Edinburgh	team pursuit

Jonathan 'Jon' Walshaw (born 1967), is an English retired cyclist.

== Cycling career ==
He represented England and competed in the 10 mile scratch race and 1 km time trial and won a bronze medal in the 4,000 metres team pursuit event, with Chris Boardman, Rob Muzio, Guy Rowland and Gary Coltman, at the 1986 Commonwealth Games in Edinburgh, Scotland.

Walshaw was a British track champion, winning the British National Omnium Championships in 1988. He was a professional from 1988-1993.
