= William Maxfield (cyclist) =

British cyclist

Bill Maxfield
Personal information
- Nationality: British (English)
- Born: Third quarter 1916 Sheffield, England
- Died: 27 December 1943

Sport
- Sport: Cycling
- Club: Kentish Wheelers
Medal record
Cycling
Representing England
British Empire Games
| Gold medal – first place | 1938 Sydney | 10 miles scratch |

William Wallace Maxfield (1916–1943) was a male cyclist who competed for England. During his years of competition he was known as Bill Maxfield.

== Cycling career ==
Maxfield represented England and won a gold medal in the 10 miles scratch race at the 1938 British Empire Games in Sydney, Australia. He also competed in three other events; the Road Race, the 1,000 metres Match Sprint and the 1 km Time Trial.

In 1939, he won the British National Individual Sprint Championships at Herne Hill.

== Personal life ==
Maxfield was a storekeeper by trade and lived in Hambrook Road, London during 1938.

He was killed during World War II, when serving as a Flight Lieutenant with RAF Coastal Command. He was the captain of Handley Page Halifax "D" of No. 502 Squadron RAF which took off from RAF St Davids at 1244 hours on 27 December 1943. The aircraft was part of an anti shipping strike in the North Atlantic and it was last seen over an enemy vessel at 1750 hours, and last heard from when it transmitted an SOS signal from 45° 48' N 13° 20' W at 1945 hours. He is commemorated at the Runnymede Memorial.
