= Paul Leitch =

New Zealand cyclist (born 1963)

Personal information
- Born: 19 April 1963 (age 63) Auckland, New Zealand

Cycling career
- Sport: Cycling

Paul Leitch (born 19 April 1963) is a New Zealand cyclist. He competed at the 1988 Summer Olympics and the 1992 Summer Olympics.
