= Ron Ulmer =

New Zealand cyclist (1913–1989)

Ronald Edward Ulmer (6 September 1913 – 27 December 1989) was a New Zealand track cyclist. He was born in Wellington.

== Biography ==
In the 1938 British Empire Games he competed in the 10 miles track race, the 1 km time trial (coming 6th), and the sprint (coming 4th).

He was a national champion several times over and later proprietor of Bluebird Cycles in Petone in the Hutt Valley.

He was the father of junior road cycling champion Gary Ulmer and the grandfather of Olympic cyclist Sarah Ulmer, who said in 1991 that she had inherited Ron Ulmer's 1950 Zeus cycle from her father.
