= Ronald Triner =

New Zealand cyclist (1917–1943)

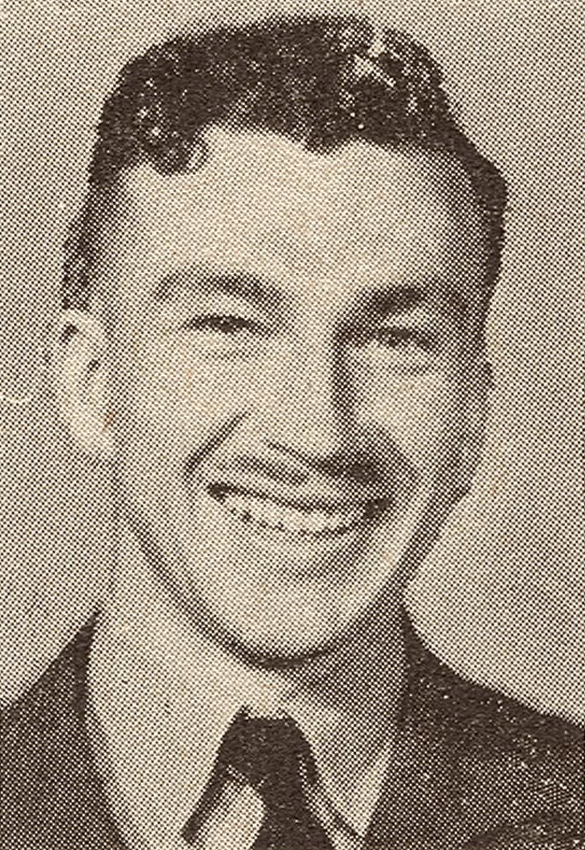
Ronald Triner

Ronald Stanley Triner (24 December 1917 – 6 May 1943) was a New Zealand road cyclist. He was killed in an air crash during World War II.

In the 1938 British Empire Games he competed in the Road Race, and he was a New Zealand cycling champion.

He was born in Auckland, and was a radio mechanic with Radio (1936) Ltd. He enlisted in the Royal New Zealand Air Force in 1939. In 1943 he was the navigator of a Hudson aircraft that crashed on takeoff from Waipapakauri in Northland for an antisubmarine patrol. Pilot Officer Triner and Sergeant William Nicholls were both killed.
