= Adrian Adgar =

English cyclist

Personal information
- Nationality: England
- Born: 1965 (age 60–61) Nottingham

Adrian Adgar (born 1965) is a retired cyclist who competed for England.

== Cycling career ==
Adgar finished runner-up in the 1987 British National Madison Championships with Paul Wain. He represented England in the 10 miles scratch race event, at the 1986 Commonwealth Games in Edinburgh, Scotland. Adrian Adgar competed in the Men's 10 Mile Scratch Race at the 1986 Commonwealth Games in Edinburgh, Scotland.
