= Gary Anderson (cyclist) =

New Zealand cyclist (born 1967)

Gary Anderson MBE
Personal information
- Full name: Gary John Anderson
- Born: 18 September 1967 (age 59) London, England

Cycling career
- Sport: Cycling
Medal record
Representing New Zealand
Men's track cycling
Olympic Games
Bronze medal – third place	1992 Barcelona	4000m Individual Pursuit
Commonwealth Games
Gold medal – first place	1990 Auckland	4000m Individual Pursuit
Gold medal – first place	1990 Auckland	4000m Team Pursuit
Gold medal – first place	1990 Auckland	10 Mile Track Race
Silver medal – second place	1986 Edinburgh	4000m Team Pursuit
Silver medal – second place	1986 Edinburgh	1000m Time Trial
Silver medal – second place	1990 Auckland	1000m Time Trial
Bronze medal – third place	1986 Edinburgh	4000m Individual Pursuit
Bronze medal – third place	1986 Edinburgh	10 Mile Track Race

Gary John Anderson MBE (born 18 September 1967) is a former track and road cyclist from New Zealand who won an Olympic bronze medal and three Commonwealth Games gold medals.

== Cycling career ==
Anderson attended four Olympics. He finished third in the 4000m pursuit at the 1992 Olympic Games in Barcelona, Spain, and achieved the following placings at his other games:

- 1988 Seoul (4000m Ind. Pursuit): 7th
- 1996 Atlanta (4000m Ind. Pursuit): 13th
- 2000 Sydney (4000m Ind. Pursuit): 6th

Anderson won eight medals at the Commonwealth Games, including three golds at the 1990 Commonwealth Games in Auckland.

In the 1990 Queen's Birthday Honours, Anderson was appointed a Member of the Order of the British Empire, for services to cycling. He was also awarded the New Zealand 1990 Commemoration Medal.

Anderson raced with a heart defect which could make his heart race under stress. He was in top form prior to the 1998 Commonwealth Games in Kuala Lumpur but was injured in a crash and instead commentated for Television New Zealand. After returning for his final Games in Sydney he turned to coaching and managing.

== Personal life ==
In 1999 while at the New Zealand National track cycling championships, Anderson was involved in an altercation with a member of the Ulysses Motorcycle Club. This resulted in an inquiry by Cycling New Zealand into the matter.

Awards
Preceded by Anthony Mosse	Lonsdale Cup of the New Zealand Olympic Committee; 1990	Succeeded by Anna Simcic
