= Greg Fraine =

New Zealand cyclist (born 1962)

Personal information
- Born: 12 October 1962 (age 64) Sydney, Australia

Cycling career
- Sport: Cycling
Medal record
Representing New Zealand
Men's road cycling
Commonwealth Games
Silver medal – second place	1986 Edinburgh	Road Team Time Trial

Gregory John Fraine (born 12 October 1962) is a New Zealand cyclist. He competed in the team time trial at the 1988 Summer Olympics.
