= Philip Harland =

New Zealand cyclist

Medal record
Men's Track cycling
Representing New Zealand
British Commonwealth Games
Bronze medal – third place	1974 Christchurch	tandem sprint

Philip Harland is a former track cyclist from New Zealand. He won the bronze medal in the men's tandem sprint at the 1974 British Commonwealth Games partnering Paul Medhurst.
