= Gary Coltman =

British cyclist

Personal information
- Born: 29 June 1965 (age 61) Leicester, England
Medal record
Cycling
Representing England
Commonwealth Games
Bronze medal – third place	1986 Edinburgh	team pursuit

Gary Coltman (born 1965), is an English retired cyclist and organiser of the Lincoln Grand Prix.

== Cycling career ==
He represented England and competed in the 4,000 metres individual pursuit and won a bronze medal in the 4,000 metres team pursuit event, with Chris Boardman, Rob Muzio, Guy Rowland and Jon Walshaw, at the 1986 Commonwealth Games in Edinburgh, Scotland.

Coltman was a 5 times British track champion, winning the British National Omnium Championships from 1989 to 1993 and was a professional from 1988 to 1996.

== Management ==
In 2013 he became the head of performance for Scottish Cycling.

== Personal life ==
His daughter Amelia Coltman in a skeleton bob racer.
