= Jeff Leslie =

Australian cyclist (born 1952)

Personal information
- Born: 11 December 1952 (age 73)

Cycling career
- Sport: Cycling
Medal record
Men's road cycling
Representing Australia
Commonwealth Games
Bronze medal – third place	1986 Edinburgh	Road race

Jeffrey Francis Leslie (born 11 December 1952) is an Australian former cyclist. He competed in the individual road race and the team time trial events at the 1984 Summer Olympics.
