= Andrew Whitford =

New Zealand cyclist

Personal information
- Born: 17 March 1965 (age 61) Manchester, England

Cycling career
- Sport: Cycling

Andrew Whitford (born 17 March 1965) is a New Zealand former cyclist. He competed in the team pursuit event at the 1988 Summer Olympics.
