= Murray Hall (cyclist) =

Australian cyclist and author

Personal information
- Full name: Murray Hall
- Born: 1 October 1953 (age 73) Melbourne, Australia

Cycling career
- Sport: Cycling
- Role: Rider
Medal record
Representing AUS
Men's cycling
Commonwealth Games
Silver medal – second place	1974 Christchurch	Team Pursuit
Silver medal – second place	1974 Christchurch	10 mile Scratch

Murray Hall (born 1 October 1953) is a former Australian racing cyclist. He finished in second place in the Australian National Road Race Championships in 1985. before turning his hand to writing and publishing his first book, Walk A War In My Shoes (non-fiction) in 2018, and his second book, Unlikely Barons (fiction) in 2022.

Murray commenced competitive cycling as a 12 year old in December 1965 with the Mordialloc Amateur Cycling Club, (Victoria – Australia).

1967

Victorian under 14 Schoolboy Champion

1969-71

Multiple Victorian and Australian Championships in Juvenile and under 18 divisions on road and track disciplines of sprint, time trial and scratch race.

1971

1st Australian Team Pursuit Championship (Southcott Cup). Youngest recorded rider to compete in a winning team.

1972-74

Competed extensively, (Amateur) in UK, Europe, Canada and Caribbean.

1972 – 73

1st Australian Tandem Championship. (Partnered with Ken Davis)

1st Thornbury Cup, Brighton – England.

3rd 20 km Championship of London.

1st British Madison Championship. (Partnered with Tom Moloney)

4th London 6-Day race. (Partnered with Tom Moloney)

4th Ghent 6-Day race. (Partnered with Tom Moloney)

1st Berlin Point Race Championship, (Winter track)

1974

2nd Commonwealth Games Teams Pursuit

2nd Commonwealth Games 10-mile scratch race

2nd “Tarax” 12-hour Madison. (Partnered with David Allan)

7th Brno-Czechoslovakia, 6-Day race. (Partnered with David Allan)

1st British Team Pursuit Championship

1st Sprint Championship of London

1975

1st Echuca Omnium Championship (Previous wins also in 73 & 74)

3rd Australian Scratch Race Championship

3rd Australian 4 km Pursuit Championship

1st Australian Team Pursuit Championship, (Southcott Cup)

1976

3rd “Tarax” 12-hour Madison. (Partnered with Terry Hammond)

2nd Australian Team Pursuit Championship, (Southcott Cup)

1977

2nd Australian Scratch Race Championship

2nd Australian 4 km Pursuit Championship

2nd Australian Team Pursuit Championship, (Southcott Cup)

1978

2nd Australian Team Pursuit Championship, (Southcott Cup)

Turned Professional in March.

4th Australian Grand Prix Road Race – Sandown Park

1st Mersey Wheelrace – Devonport

1979

1st Launceston 6-Day Race. (Partnered with David Sanders)

1st Australian 5 km Pursuit Championship

2nd Australian Team Pursuit Championship

1980

1st Launceston 6-Day Race. (Partnered with David Sanders)

2nd Australian 5 km Pursuit Championship

1st Australian Team Pursuit Championship

1st Australian Madison Championship. (Partnered with David Sanders)

1981

1st Burnie Wheelrace

1st Tour of The North – Tasmania

4th Launceston to Hobart

3rd Australian 5 km Pursuit Championship

3rd Australian Points Race Championship

1st Australian Team Pursuit Championship

3rd Sun Tour – 2 x Stage wins

1982

Fastest time – Melbourne to Yarrawonga

1st Launceston to Hobart

1st Australian Grand Prix Road Race – Sandown Park

Sun Tour – 2 x Stage wins

1983

2nd Australian 5 km Pursuit Championship

2nd Australian Team Pursuit Championship

1984

3rd Australian 5 km Pursuit Championship

3rd Australian Points Race Championship

1st Australian Team Pursuit Championship

1985

1st Griffin Tour – Western Australia

1st Beverley to Perth

3rd Australian Points Race Championship

1st Australian Team Pursuit Championship

1st Australian 10 km Scratch Race Championship

2nd Australian Road Race Championship

3rd Australian Criterium Championship

1986

3rd Australian 5 km Pursuit Championship

2nd Australian Madison Championship. (Partnered with Anthony Hughes)

2nd Australian 10 km Scratch Race Championship

1990

1st Australian Team Pursuit Championship

Published Work

Murray Hall is the author of Walk a War In My Shoes and Unlikely Barons. Both of which are available at good online retailers, including Amazon and Booktopia.

Walk a War In My Shoes was published in November 2018 and is the memoir of Murray's Great-Uncle Ernest Alfred Hall. After finding Ernest's letters home from World War One, Murray knew he had to share the story, and spent five years researching and walking the steps that his Great-Uncle took prior to his death.

Unlikely Barons was published in December 2022 and is a crime fiction novel of two friends who just wanted to get ahead, in the wild west town of Broome, Western Australia.
