= Brett Dutton =

Australian cyclist (born 1966)

Personal information
- Full name: Brett Allan Dutton
- Born: 18 November 1966 (age 59)

Cycling career
- Sport: Cycling
- Current team: St George Continental Cycling Team
- Disciplines: Track; Road
- Role: Rider (retired); Directeur sportif

Managerial team
- 2016–: St George Merida Cycling Team
Medal record
Representing Australia
Men's track cycling
Olympic Games
Bronze medal – third place	1988 Seoul	Men's team pursuit
Commonwealth Games
Gold medal – first place	1986 Edinburgh	Team pursuit

Brett Allan Dutton (born 18 November 1966) is an Australian former professional cyclist, who currently works as a directeur sportif for UCI Continental team St George Continental Cycling Team. He won the bronze medal in Men's team pursuit in the 1988 Summer Olympics.

Dutton set the fastest time in the Goulburn to Sydney Classic in 1992 run from Goulburn to Liverpool.
