= Wayne McCarney =

Australian cyclist

Personal information
- Born: 30 June 1966 (age 60) Colac, Victoria

Cycling career
- Sport: Cycling
- Discipline: Track
Medal record
Representing Australia
Men's track cycling
Olympic Games
| Bronze medal – third place | 1988 Seoul | Men's team pursuit |
Commonwealth Games
| Gold medal – first place | 1986 Edinburgh | Men's Team pursuit |

Wayne McCarney (born 30 June 1966) is an Australian cyclist. He won the bronze medal in Men's team pursuit in the 1988 Summer Olympics.
