= Martin Vinnicombe =

Australian cyclist

Personal information
- Full name: James Martin Vinnicombe
- Born: 5 December 1964 (age 61) Melbourne, Victoria, Australia
- Weight: 86 kg (190 lb)

Cycling career
- Sport: Cycling
- Discipline: Track
- Role: Rider
- Rider type: Sprinter

Professional team
- 1992–1994: Giramondo Cycles & Clarence Street Cyclery
Medal record
Men's track cycling
Representing Australia
Olympic Games
Silver medal – second place	1988 Seoul	1 km time trial
World Championships (Amateur)
Gold medal – first place	1987 Vienna	1 km time trial
Silver medal – second place	1986 Colorado Springs	1 km time trial
Silver medal – second place	1989 Lyon	1 km time trial
Silver medal – second place	1990 Maebashi	1 km time trial
Bronze medal – third place	1985 Bassano del Grappa	1 km time trial
Commonwealth Games
Gold medal – first place	1986 Edinburgh	Time trial
Gold medal – first place	1990 Auckland	Time trial

James “Martin” Vinnicombe (born 5 December 1964) is an Australian former professional track cyclist who competed at the 1988 Summer Olympics in Seoul, winning a silver medal in 1,000 metres (3,300 ft) time trial. He tested positive for steroids in 1991, but accusations were overturned and Vinnicombe received $240,000 in compensation for false allegations in defamation. His former manager, Phill Bates, told the Sydney Morning Herald in 1996: "If you’re not cheating, you’re not trying." At 22 years of age, Vinnicombe won the world championship in 1 km (0.62 mi) time trial in 1987, being the first ever Australian to become world champion, He also won the silver medal three times (1986, 1989 and 1990) and the bronze medal once (1985). Vinnicombe has placed 9 times at the world championships in 1,000m time trial event.

As part of the lead up to the 2008 Summer Olympics in Beijing, Vinnicombe had been selected to be in charge of coaching Chinese cyclists in the Fujian province, but in 2005 was banned from the country for four years and fined after one of his cyclists tested positive for steroids but was overturned and received compensation for false charges, Vinnicombe denied any wrongdoing.

In 2012 he was offered to be in the cycling hall of fame.
