= Tassy Johnson =

Australian cyclist (1916–1981)

Personal information
- Born: 22 September 1916 Victoria, Australia
- Died: 24 April 1981 (aged 64) Essendon, Victoria, Australia

Cycling career
- Sport: Cycling

Tasman Ian Johnson (22 September 1916 – 24 April 1981) was an Australian cyclist. He competed in the individual road race and the time trial events at the 1936 Summer Olympics in Berlin and won a silver medal in the Time Trial at the 1938 British Empire Games in Sydney.

Following his retirement from cycling, Johnson refereed 27 of the 29 Herald-Sun cycling tours of Victoria, Australian championships and the Bendigo Madison.

Johnson died of a heart attack aged 65 in Melbourne on 24 April 1981.

Tassy Johnson was the father of Gordon Johnson.
