= Keith Reynolds =

British cyclist

Personal information
- Born: 25 December 1963 (age 62) Solihull, England

Cycling career
- Sport: Cycling
Medal record
Cycling
Representing England
Commonwealth Games
Gold medal – first place	1986 Edinburgh	team time trial

Keith Reynolds (born 25 December 1963) is a British former cyclist. Following national success as a junior where he won the season long National Junior Road Series in 1981, he competed in the team time trial event at the 1984 Summer Olympics.

He also represented England and won a gold medal in the road team time trial, at the 1986 Commonwealth Games in Edinburgh, Scotland.
