= Richard Paris (cyclist) =

Australian cyclist (1942–2017)

Personal information
- Full name: Richard Ian Paris
- Nickname: Dick Paris
- Born: 8 April 1942
- Died: 4 October 2017 (aged 75)
- Height: 174 cm (5 ft 9 in)
- Weight: 76 kg (168 lb)

Cycling career
- Sport: Cycling
Medal record
Representing AUS
Men's cycling
Commonwealth Games
Gold medal – first place	1974 Christchurch	Time trial

Richard Paris (8 April 1942 – 4 October 2017) was an Australian cyclist. He competed in the 1000m time trial at the 1964 Summer Olympics. Paris set the fastest time in the amateur Goulburn to Sydney Classic in 1973 run in reverse direction from Milperra to Goulburn.
