= Hennie Binneman =

South African cyclist (1914–1968)

Personal information
- Born: 30 April 1914 Bellville, Western Cape, South Africa
- Died: 19 March 1968 (aged 53) Gordon's Bay, South Africa

Cycling career
- Sport: Cycling

Hendrik Jacobus Gijsbert Binneman (30 April 1914 – 19 March 1968) was a South African cyclist. He competed in the individual road race event at the 1936 Summer Olympics.
