= Paul Brydon (cyclist) =

New Zealand cyclist

Personal information
- Born: 8 December 1951 (age 74) Christchurch, New Zealand
Medal record
Men's Track cycling
Representing New Zealand
Commonwealth Games
Bronze medal – third place	1974 Christchurch	Team Pursuit

Paul David Brydon (born 8 December 1951) is a former road and track cyclist from New Zealand, who won the bronze medal in the men's 4000 m team pursuit at the 1974 Commonwealth Games in his native Christchurch. Brydon also represented his native country at the 1972 Summer Olympics in Munich, West Germany, where he finished in 50th place in the men's individual road race.
