= Canada at the 1986 Commonwealth Games =

- CGF code: CAN
- CGA: Commonwealth Games Canada

in Edinburgh, Scotland
- Medals Ranked 2nd: Gold 51 Silver 34 Bronze 30 Total 115

Commonwealth Games appearances (overview)
- 1930; 1934; 1938; 1950; 1954; 1958; 1962; 1966; 1970; 1974; 1978; 1982; 1986; 1990; 1994; 1998; 2002; 2006; 2010; 2014; 2018; 2022; 2026; 2030

Other related appearances
- Newfoundland (1930, 1934)

Canada competed in the 1986 Commonwealth Games in Edinburgh between 24 July–2 August.

Canada finished sixth in the medals table with 51 gold, 34 silver and 30 bronze medals.

== Medallists ==
Medal	Name	Sport	Event
Gold	Ben Johnson	Athletics	Men's 100 metres
Gold	Atlee Mahorn	Athletics	Men's 200 metres
Gold	Mark McKoy	Athletics	Men's 110 metres hurdle
Gold	Graeme Fell	Athletics	Men's 3000 metres steeplechase
Gold	Mark McKoy; Atlee Mahorn; Ben Johnson; Desai Williams	Athletics	Men's 4 × 100 metres relay
Gold	Milt Ottey	Athletics	Men's high jump
Gold	Ray Lazdins	Athletics	Men's discus throw
Gold	Angella Issajenko	Athletics	Women's 200 metres
Gold	Lynn Williams	Athletics	Women's 3000 metres
Gold	Charmaine Crooks; Marita Payne; Molly Killingbeck; Jillian Richardson	Athletics	Women's 4 × 400 metres relay
Gold	Scotty Olson	Boxing	Men's light flyweight (48 kg)
Gold	Bill Downey	Boxing	Men's featherweight (57 kg)
Gold	Asif Dar	Boxing	Men's lightweight (60 kg)
Gold	Howard Grant	Boxing	Men's light welterweight (63.5 kg)
Gold	Dan Sherry	Boxing	Men's light middleweight (71 kg)
Gold	Lennox Lewis	Boxing	Men's super Heavyweight (>91 kg)
Gold	Debbie Fuller	Diving	Women's springboard
Gold	Debbie Fuller	Diving	Women's highboard
Gold	Mark Tewksbury	Swimming	Men's 100m backstroke
Gold	Sandy Goss	Swimming	Men's 200m backstroke
Gold	Victor Davis	Swimming	Men's 100m breaststroke
Gold	Alex Baumann	Swimming	Men's 200m individual medlay
Gold	Alex Baumann	Swimming	Men's 400m individual medlay
Gold	Mike West; Darcy Wallingford; Claude Lamy; Sandy Goss; Mark Tewksbury; Victor Davis; Tom Ponting; Alex Baumann	Swimming	Men's 4x100 metre medlay relay
Gold	Jane Kerr	Swimming	Women's 100m freestyle
Gold	Allison Higson	Swimming	Women's 100m breaststroke
Gold	Allison Higson	Swimming	Women's 200m breaststroke
Gold	Donna McGinnis	Swimming	Women's 200m butterfly
Gold	Angela Nugent; Jane Kerr; Patricia Noall; Pamela Rai	Swimming	Women's 4x100 metre freestyle relay
Gold	Sylvie Frechette	Synchronised swimming	Women's solo
Gold	Michelle Cameron; Carolyn Waldo	Synchronised Swimming	Women's duet
Gold	Pat Walker; Bruce Ford	Rowing	Men's double sculls
Gold	Pat Turner; Kevin Neufeld; Paul Steele; Grant Main	Rowing	Men's coxless fours
Gold	Kathryn Barr; Andrea Schreiner	Rowing	Women's coxless pairs
Gold	Jane Tregunno; Jenny Wallinga; Tina Clarke; Tricia Smith; Lesley Thompson	Rowing	Women's coxed fours
Gold	Tom Guinn; Claude Beaulieu	Shooting	Open free pistol – pairs
Gold	Michael Ashcroft; Gale Stewart	Shooting	Open rifle prone – pairs
Gold	Alain Marion; Wilf Baldwin	Shooting	Open full bore rifle – pairs
Gold	Guy Lorion	Shooting	Open air rifle
Gold	Guy Lorion; Sharon Bowes	Shooting	Open air rifle – pairs
Gold	Denis Garon	Weightlifting	Men's 100 kg
Gold	Kevin Roy	Weightlifting	Men's 110 kg
Gold	Ron Moncur	Wrestling	Men's light flyweight (48 kg)
Gold	Chris Woodcroft	Wrestling	Men's flyweight (52 kg)
Gold	Mitch Ostberg	Wrestling	Men's bantamweight (57 kg)
Gold	Paul Hughes	Wrestling	Men's featherweight (62 kg)
Gold	Dave McKay	Wrestling	Men's lightweight (68 kg)
Gold	Gary Holmes	Wrestling	Men's welterweight (74 kg)
Gold	Chris Rinke	Wrestling	Men's middleweight (82 kg)
Gold	Clark Davis	Wrestling	Men's heavyweight (100 kg)
Gold	Wayne Brightwell	Wrestling	Men's super heavyweight (130 kg)
Silver	Dave Edge	Athletics	Men's marathon
Silver	Guillaume LeBlanc	Athletics	Men's 30 kilometres walk
Silver	Bob Ferguson	Athletics	Men's pole vault
Silver	Dave Steen	Athletics	Men's decathlon
Silver	Jillian Richardson	Athletics	Women's 400 metres
Silver	Debbie Bowker	Athletics	Women's 1500 metres
Silver	Debbie Bowker	Athletics	Women's 3000 metres
Silver	Donalda Duprey	Athletics	Women's 400 metres hurdles
Silver	Angela Bailey; Esmie Lawrence; Angela Phipps; Angella Issajenko	Athletics	Women's 4 × 100 metres relay
Silver	John Nash	Diving	Men's springboard
Silver	David Bédard	Diving	Men's highboard
Silver	Victor Davis	Swimming	Men's 200m breaststroke
Silver	Tom Ponting	Swimming	Men's 200m butterfly
Silver	Vlastimil Cerny; Sandy Goss; Blair Hicken; Alex Baumann	Swimming	Men's 4x100 metre freestyle relay
Silver	Sandy Goss; Scott Flowers; Tom Ponting; Paul Szekula	Swimming	Men's 4x200 metre freestyle relay
Silver	Jane Kerr	Swimming	Women's 200m freestyle
Silver	Cindy Õunpuu	Swimming	Women's 200m breaststroke
Silver	Barbara McBain; Allison Higson; Donna McGinnis; Jane Kerr	Swimming	Women's 4×100 metre medley relay
Silver	Denyse Julien; Johanne Falardeau	Badminton	Women's doubles
Silver	Canada	Badminton	Mixed team
Silver	Alex Ongaro	Cycling	Men's sprint
Silver	Ronnie Jones; Bill Boettger	Lawn bowls	Men's pairs
Silver	Dan Milligan; Dave Brown; Dave Houtby; Dave Duncalf	Lawn bowls	Men's fours
Silver	Peter Tatersall	Rowing	Men's lightweight single sculls
Silver	Lisa Wright	Rowing	Women's single sculls
Silver	Heather Clarke; Lisa Robertson	Rowing	Women's double sculls
Silver	Tom Guinn	Shooting	Open air pistol
Silver	Michel Dion; Jean-François Sénécal	Shooting	Open rifle three positions – pairs
Silver	Alain Marion	Shooting	Open full bore rifle
Silver	Sharon Bowes	Shooting	Open air rifle
Silver	Brian Gabriel; Don Kwasnycia	Shooting	Open skeet – pairs
Silver	Louis Payer	Weightlifting	Men's 75 kg
Silver	David Bolduc	Weightlifting	Men's 110 kg
Silver	Doug Cox	Wrestling	Men's light heavyweight (90 kg)
Bronze	Ben Johnson	Athletics	Men's 200 metres
Bronze	David Campbell	Athletics	Men's 1500 metres
Bronze	John Graham	Athletics	Men's 400 metres hurdles
Bronze	Anton Skerritt; Andre Smith; John Graham; Atlee Mahorn	Athletics	Men's 4 × 400 metres relay
Bronze	Alain Metellus	Athletics	Men's high jump
Bronze	Kyle McDuffie	Athletics	Men's long jump
Bronze	Angella Issajenko	Athletics	Women's 100 metres
Bronze	Lynn Williams	Athletics	Women's 1500 metres
Bronze	Odette Lapierre	Athletics	Women's marathon
Bronze	Steve Beaupré	Boxing	Men's flyweight (51 kg)
Bronze	John Shaw	Boxing	Men's welterweight (67 kg)
Bronze	Brent Kosolofski	Boxing	Men's light heavyweight (81 kg)
Bronze	Dominic d'Amico	Boxing	Men's heavyweight (91 kg)
Bronze	Kathy Keleman	Diving	Women's springboard
Bronze	Chris Chalmers	Swimming	Men's 1500m freestyle
Bronze	Mike West	Swimming	Men's 100m backstroke
Bronze	Sean Murphy	Swimming	Men's 200m backstroke
Bronze	Tom Ponting	Swimming	Men's 100m butterfly
Bronze	Jill Horstead	Swimming	Women's 200m butterfly
Bronze	Jane Kerr	Swimming	Women's 200m individual medley
Bronze	Sophie Dufour; Donna McGinnis; Jane Kerr; Patricia Noall	Swimming	Women's 4x200 metre freestyle relay
Bronze	Bob Thomas; Ryan Tierney; Brian Peaker; Dave Henry	Rowing	Men's lightweight coxless fours
Bronze	Heather Hattin	Rowing	Women's lightweight single sculls
Bronze	Wendy Wiebe; Marlene Vanderhorst; Anne Dorst; Marnie Hamilton	Rowing	Women's lightweight coxless fours
Bronze	Mark Howkins	Shooting	Open rapid-fire pistol
Bronze	Mark Howkins; Andre Chevrefils	Shooting	Open rapid-fire pistol – pairs
Bronze	Jean-François Sénécal	Shooting	Open rifle three positions
Bronze	Brian Gabriel	Shooting	Open skeet
Bronze	Langis Cote	Weightlifting	Men's 67.5 kg
Bronze	Guy Greavette	Weightlifting	Men's 90 kg

Medals by sport
Sport	Gold medal	Silver medal	Bronze medal	Total
Aquatics	15	9	8	32
Athletics	10	9	9	28
Wrestling	9	1	0	10
Boxing	6	0	4	10
Shooting	5	5	4	14
Rowing	4	3	3	10
Weightlifting	2	2	2	6
Badminton	0	2	0	2
Lawn bowls	0	2	0	2
Cycling	0	1	0	1
Total	51	34	30	115

Medals by gender
Gender	Gold medal	Silver medal	Bronze medal	Total
Male	32	17	17	66
Female	14	11	9	34
Mixed / open	5	6	4	15
Total	51	34	30	115

== Aquatics ==
The aquatics events were held at the Royal Commonwealth Pool.

=== Diving ===
Men

Athlete	Event	Final	
Athlete	Event	Points	Rank
John Nash	Springboard	647.64	(silver)
Randy Sageman	Springboard	615.99	5
David Bédard	Springboard	585.24	7
David Bédard	Highboard	576.81	(silver)
John Nash	Highboard	560.25	4
Jeff Hirst	Highboard	555.66	5

Women

Athlete	Event	Final	
Athlete	Event	Points	Rank
Debbie Fuller	Springboard	513.09	(gold)
Kathy Keleman	Springboard	484.65	(bronze)
Jenny Tysdale	Springboard	440.70	7
Debbie Fuller	Highboard	431.61	(gold)
Jenny McArton	Highboard	389.46	5
Jenny Tysdale	Highboard	383.88	6

=== Swimming ===
Men

Athlete	Event	Heat		Final	
Athlete	Event	Time	Rank	Time	Rank
Sandy Goss	100 metre freestyle	51.61	1 Q	51.45	4
Vlastimil Cerny	100 metre freestyle	51.95	2 Q	51.53	6
Blair Hicken	100 metre freestyle	51.72	2 Q	51.61	7
Tom Ponting	200 metre freestyle	1:52.72	2 Q	1:52.37	4
Sandy Goss	200 metre freestyle	1:53.85	3	did not advance	
Scott Flowers	200 metre freestyle	1:53.17	2 Q	1:53.76	7
Scott Flowers	400 metre freestyle	3:57.66	3 Q	3:57.43	4
Chris Bowie	400 metre freestyle	4:00.32	4 Q	3:58.28	7
Turlough O'Hare	400 metre freestyle	3:58.81	2 Q	3:58.33	8
Harry Taylor	1500 metre freestyle	15:54.50	2 Q	15:24.54	5
Turlough O'Hare	1500 metre freestyle	16:06.16	5	did not advance	
Chris Chalmers	1500 metre freestyle	15:42.62	1 Q	15:18.05	(bronze)
Sean Murphy	100 metre backstroke	58.03	1 Q	57.93	4
Mike West	100 metre backstroke	57.85	2 Q	57.46	(bronze)
Mark Tewksbury	100 metre backstroke	57.33	1 Q	56.45	(gold)
Sandy Goss	200 metre backstroke	2:03.67	1 Q	2:02.55	(gold)
Mike West	200 metre backstroke	2:05.57	2 Q	2:04.86	5
Sean Murphy	200 metre backstroke	2:04.32	1 Q	2:03.05	(bronze)
Rob Chernoff	100 metre breaststroke	1:06.57	3	did not advance	
Darcy Wallingford	100 metre breaststroke	1:05.84	2 Q	1:05.61	7
Victor Davis	100 metre breaststroke	1:02.56	1 Q	1:03.01	(gold)
Alex Baumann	200 metre breaststroke	2:21.53	1 Q	2:20.83	4
Rob Chernoff	200 metre breaststroke	2:23.22	3	did not advance	
Victor Davis	200 metre breaststroke	2:17.96	1 Q	2:16.70	(silver)
Vlastimil Cerny	100 metre butterfly	56.11	2 Q	55.74	6
Tom Ponting	100 metre butterfly	54.68	1 Q	54.56	(bronze)
Claude Lamy	100 metre butterfly	56.66	4	did not advance	
Tom Ponting	200 metre butterfly	1:59.94	1 Q	1:58.54	(silver)
Michael Meldrum	200 metre butterfly	2:05.04	3	did not advance	
Vlastimil Cerny	200 metre butterfly	2:03.41	3 Q	2:01.33	5
Victor Davis	200 metre individual medley	2:06.18	1 Q	2:05.75	5
Alex Baumann	200 metre individual medley	2:05.91	1 Q	2:01.80	(gold)
Rob Chernoff	200 metre individual medley	2:08.28	4	2:08.81	7
Alex Baumann	400 metre Individual Medley	4:28.35	1 Q	2:05.10	(gold)
Jon Kelly	400 metre Individual Medley	4:30.63	3 Q	4:27.26	5
Deke Botsford	400 metre Individual Medley	4:32.89	5	4:33.05	8
Vlastimil Cerny; Sandy Goss; Blair Hicken; Alex Baumann	4x100 metre freestyle relay	—N/a		3:22.98	(silver)
Sandy Goss; Scott Flowers; Tom Ponting; Paul Szekula	4x200 metre freestyle relay	—N/a		7:29.52	(silver)
Mike West (Heat); Darcy Wallingford (Heat); Claude Lamy (Heat); Sandy Goss (Heat); Mark Tewksbury (Final); Victor Davis (Final); Tom Ponting (Final); Alex Baumann (Final)	4x100 metre medlay relay	3:54.77	1 Q	3:44.00	(gold)

Women

Athlete	Event	Heat		Final	
Athlete	Event	Time	Rank	Time	Rank
Pamela Rai	100 metre freestyle	58.76	2 Q	58.81	7
Jane Kerr	100 metre freestyle	57.64	1 Q	57.62	(gold)
Patricia Noall	100 metre freestyle	59.14	3 Q	58.94	8
Jane Kerr	200 metre freestyle	—N/a		2:03.40	(silver)
Patricia Noall	200 metre freestyle	—N/a		2:05.04	6
Debbie Wurzburger	400 metre freestyle	4:19.98	4 Q	4:20.97	7
Donna McGinnis	400 metre freestyle	4:16.93	2 Q	4:16.21	4
Sara Frisby	400 metre freestyle	4:25.25	5	did not advance	
Debbie Wurzburger	800 metre freestyle	8:45.94	3 Q	8:44.16	5
Kim Milne	800 metre freestyle	8:54.00	4 Q	8:57.94	8
Barbara McBain	100 metre backstroke	1:05.84	3	did not advance	
Jennifer McElroy	100 metre backstroke	1:07.83	5	did not advance	
Pascale Choquet	100 metre backstroke	1:06.41	5	did not advance	
Jane Kerr	200 metre backstroke	2:27.10	5	did not advance	
Pascale Choquet	200 metre backstroke	2:21.57	3 Q	2:22.02	8
Barabara McCain	200 metre backstroke	2:22.09	4	did not advance	
Kathy Pearson	100 metre breaststroke	1:14.21	3	did not advance	
Allison Higson	100 metre breaststroke	1:11.78	1 Q	1:10.84	(gold)
Cindy Õunpuu	100 metre breaststroke	1:12.63	2 Q	1:12.55	5
Allison Higson	200 metre breaststroke	2:36.21	1 Q	2:31.20	(gold)
Cindy Õunpuu	200 metre breaststroke	2:34.81	1 Q	2:32.63	(silver)
Susan Atkey	200 metre breaststroke	2:41.44	4	did not advance	
Jill Horstead	100 metre butterfly	1:04.69	3	did not advance	
Pamela Rai	100 metre butterfly	1:03.80	3 Q	1:03.48	7
Michelle MacPherson	100 metre butterfly	1:03.99	3 Q	1:03.66	8
Sophie Dufour	200 metre butterfly	2:21.61	4	did not advance	
Jill Horstead	200 metre butterfly	2:16.51	2 Q	2:14.53	(bronze)
Donna McGinnis	200 metre butterfly	2:12.71	1 Q	2:11.97	(gold)
Jane Kerr	200 metre individual medley	2:21.11	1 Q	2:18.73	(bronze)
Jennifer McElroy	200 metre individual medley	2:22.74	3 Q	Disqualified	
Karin Helmstaedt	200 metre individual medley	2:22.48	5 Q	2:21.05	4
Donna McGinnis	400 metre individual medley	4:54.42	1 Q	4:51.62	4
Sara Frisby	400 metre individual medley	5:03.07	5	did not advance	
Jennifer McElroy	400 metre individual medley	5:01.74	5	did not advance	
Angela Nugent; Jane Kerr; Patricia Noall; Pamela Rai	4x100 metre freestyle relay	—N/a		3:48.45	(gold)
Sophie Dufour; Donna McGinnis; Jane Kerr; Patricia Noall	4x200 metre freestyle relay	—N/a		8:20.78	(bronze)
Barbara McBain; Allison Higson; Donna McGinnis; Jane Kerr	4×100 metre medley relay	—N/a		4:14.89	(silver)

Synchronised swimming

Athlete	Event	Final	
Athlete	Event	Points	Rank
Sylvie Frechette	Synchronised solo	199.50	(gold)
Michelle Cameron; Carolyn Waldo	Synchronised duet	199.54	(gold)

== Athletics ==
Men
Track and road

Athlete	Event	Heat		Semifinal		Final	
Athlete	Event	Time	Rank	Time	Rank	Time	Rank
Desai Williams	100 metres	10.49	2 Q	10.41	2 Q	10.36	4
Ben Johnson	100 metres	10.15	1 Q	10.18	1 Q	10.07	(gold)
Michael Dwyer	100 metres	10.81	4 Q	10.42	5	did not advance	
Michael Dwyer	200 metres	22.22	2 Q	20.97	3 Q	20.98	6
Atlee Mahorn	200 metres	20.98	1 Q	20.68	1 Q	20.31	(gold)
Ben Johnson	200 metres	20.84	2 Q	21.28	4	20.64	(bronze)
Anton Skerritt	400 metres	47.53	3 Q	47.74	5 q	47.97	8
Andre Smith	400 metres	47.21	3 Q	47.96	4	did not advance	
Brian Thompson	800 metres	1:53.25	2 Q	1:50.25	7	did not advance	
Simon Hoogewerf	800 metres	1:51.90	3 Q	1:47.63	2 Q	1:49.04	6
David Campbell	1500 metres	—N/a		3:44.78	4 Q	3:54.06	(bronze)
Simon Hoogewerf	1500 metres	—N/a		3:46.80	7	did not advance	
Robert Lonergan	1500 metres	—N/a		3:43.48	7	did not advance	
Paul Williams	5000 metres	—N/a				13:28.51	4
Paul McCloy	5000 metres	—N/a				13:42.57	9
Robert Lonergan	5000 metres	—N/a				13:47.44	10
Paul McCloy	10,000 metres	—N/a				28.29	4
Paul Williams	10,000 metres	—N/a				28.41	6
Mark McKoy	110 metres hurdle	—N/a		13.68	2 Q	13.31	(gold)
Jeff Glass	110 metres hurdle	—N/a		13.87	3 Q	14.39	8
John Graham	400 metres hurdles	—N/a		52.63	1 Q	50.25	(bronze)
Lloyd Guss	400 metres hurdles	—N/a		52.36	3 Q	20.56	4
Pierre Leveille	400 metres hurdles	—N/a		52.75	4 q	51.54	7
Graeme Fell	3000 metres steeplechase	—N/a				8:24.48	(gold)
Phillip Laheurte	3000 metres steeplechase	—N/a				8:52.53	9
Robert Rice	3000 metres steeplechase	—N/a				9:25.84	13
Mark McKoy; Atlee Mahorn; Ben Johnson; Desai Williams	4 × 100 metres relay	—N/a				39.15	(gold)
Anton Skerritt; Andre Smith; John Graham; Atlee Mahorn	4 × 400 metres relay	—N/a				3:08.69	(bronze)
Dave Edge	Marathon	—N/a				2:11.08	(silver)
Art Boileau	Marathon	—N/a				2:12.58	5
Peter Butler	Marathon	—N/a				2:18.52	11
Guillaume LeBlanc	30 kilometres walk	—N/a				2:08.38	(silver)
François Lapointe	30 kilometres walk	—N/a				DSQ	

Field

Athlete	Event	Final	
Athlete	Event	Result	Rank
Milt Ottey	High jump	2.30	(gold)
Alain Metellus	High jump	2.14	(bronze)
Nathaniel Crooks	High jump	2.10	6
Bob Ferguson	Pole vault	5.20	(silver)
Dave Steen	Pole vault	5.10	4
Kyle McDuffie	Long jump	7.79	(bronze)
Edrick Floréal	Long jump	7.50	6
George Wright	Triple jump	15.86	6
Edrick Floréal	Triple jump	15.58	8
Rob Venier	Shot put	17.26	5
Luby Chambul	Shot put	16.86	7
Ray Lazdins	Discus throw	58.86	(gold)

Combined events – Decathlon

Athlete	Event	100 m	LJ	SP	HJ	400 m	110H	DT	PV	JT	1500 m	Final	Rank
Gordon Orlikow	Result	11.14	7.14	12.42	1.90	49.91	14.70	37.34	4.40	51.14	4:29.35	7424	6
Gordon Orlikow	Points	830	847	632	714	819	886	611	731	605	749	7424	6
Dave Steen	Result	11.14	7.40	13.22	2.02	48.45	14.91	43.63	5.00	60.18	4:22.65	8173	(silver)
Dave Steen	Points	830	910	681	822	887	860	738	910	741	794	8173	(silver)
Mike Smith	Result	11.14	7.01	12.64	1.99	48.74	15.48	37.34	3.80	60.72	4:38.48	7363	7
Mike Smith	Points	830	816	645	794	874	792	611	562	749	690	7363	7

Women
Track and road

Athlete	Event	Semifinal		Final	
Athlete	Event	Time	Rank	Time	Rank
Angela Bailey	100 metres	11.31	2 Q	11.35	4
Angella Issajenko	100 metres	11.25	2 Q	11.21	(bronze)
Esmie Lawrence	100 metres	11.68	5	did not advance	
Angella Issajenko	200 metres	22.96	1 Q	22.91	(gold)
Esmie Lawrence	200 metres	23.70	4 q	23.87	6
Charmaine Crooks	400 metres	53.39	1 Q	52.02	5
Jillian Richardson	400 metres	53.11	2 Q	51.62	(silver)
Marita Payne	400 metres	53.51	3 Q	52.00	4
Renée Belanger	800 metres	2:03.46	3 Q	2:03.85	6
Camille Cato	800 metres	2:04.08	5 q	2:03.26	5
Brit McRoberts	800 metres	2:04.33	3 Q	2:05.10	7
Debbie Bowker	1500 metres	4:26.72	1 Q	4:11.94	2nd place, silver medalist(s)
Lynn Williams	1500 metres	4:13.39	4 Q	4:12.66	3rd place, bronze medalist(s)
Lynn Williams	3000 metres	—N/a		8:54.29	(gold)
Debbie Bowker	3000 metres	—N/a		8:45.83	(silver)
Nancy Rooks	10,000 metres	—N/a		32:30.71	4
Sue Lee	10,000 metres	—N/a		32:30.75	5
Carole Rouillard	10,000 metres	—N/a		33:22.31	8
Faye Blackwood	100 metres hurdles	13.71	6	did not advance	
Yolande Jones	100 metres hurdles	13.79	7	did not advance	
Julie Rocheleau	100 metres hurdles	13.32	3 Q	13.46	4
Gwen Wall	400 metres hurdles	57.38	1 Q	57.49	4
Donalda Duprey	400 metres hurdles	58.95	3 Q	56.55	(silver)
Andrea Page	400 metres hurdles	1:00.96	5	did not advance	
Angela Bailey; Esmie Lawrence; Angela Phipps; Angella Issajenko	4 × 100 metres relay	—N/a		43.83	(silver)
Charmaine Crooks; Marita Payne; Molly Killingbeck; Jillian Richardson	4 × 400 metres relay	—N/a		3:28.92	(gold)
Odette Lapierre	Marathon	—N/a		2:31.48	(bronze)
Lizanne Bussieres	Marathon	—N/a		2:35.18	4

Field

Athlete	Event	Final	
Athlete	Event	Result	Rank
Debbie Brill	High jump	1.88	5
Linda McCurdy-Cameron	High jump	1.80	10
Alison Armstrong	High jump	No height recorded	
Sharon Clarke	Long jump	6.20	4
Tracy Smith	Long jump	6.13	7
Linda Spenst	Long jump	5.80	11
Melody Torcolacci	Shot put	16.76	4
Rosemary Hauch	Shot put	15.29	7
Gale Zaphiropoulos	Discus throw	52.28	5
Michelle Brotherton	Discus throw	49.84	7
Celine Chartrand	Javelin throw	55.80	5
Faye Roblin	Javelin throw	50.92	8
Kirsty Evans	Javelin throw	49.50	9

Combined events – Heptathlon

Athlete	Event	100H	HJ	SP	200 m	LJ	JT	800 m	Final	Rank
Linda Spenst	Result	13.82	1.73	9.95	25.50	5.93	40.30	2:16.52	5634	5
Linda Spenst	Points	1004	891	526	841	828	673		5634	5
Alison Armstrong	Result	14.68	1.70	12.73	26.78	5.31	—N/a		DNF	
Alison Armstrong	Points	884	855	709	730	645	—N/a		DNF	

== Badminton ==
Athlete	Event	Round of 16	Quarterfinals	Semifinals	Final/ Bronze Medal Match	Rank
Athlete	Event	Opposition Score	Opposition Score	Opposition Score	Opposition Score	Rank
Mike Butler	Men's singles	Kerrin Harrison (NZL); W (15–5, 15–8)	Alexander White (SCO); L (15–2, 15–6)	did not advance		
John Goss	Men's singles	Kenny Middlemiss (SCO); L (15–5, 15–9)	did not advance			
Linda Cloutier	Women's singles	Tracey Small (AUS); W (11–2, 11–9)	Helen Troke (ENG); L (11–2, 11–0)	did not advance		
Claire Sharpe	Women's singles	Amy Chan (HKG); W (11–8, 4–11, 11–8)	Gillian Clark (ENG); L (11-11, 11–6)	did not advance		
Denyse Julien	Women's singles	Elinor Allen (SCO); W (11–3, 11–5)	Gillian Gowers (ENG); W (12–0, 11–6)	Fiona Elliott (ENG); L (11–6, 11–0)	Gillian Clark (ENG); L (11–3, 11–3)	4
Sandra Skillings	Women's singles	Fiona Elliott (ENG); L (11–0, 11–4)	did not advance			
Mike Butler; Ken Poole	Men's doubles	Bill Thompson; Rikki Keag (NIR); W (17–16, 15–4)	Billy Gilliland; Dan Travers (SCO); L (15–3, 15–3)	did not advance		
Mike de Belle; Mike Bitten	Men's doubles	Ismail Shareef; Mohamed Vajeeh (MAL); W (15–0, 15–1)	Kerrin Harrison; Glenn Stewart (NZL); L (12–15, 15–10, 18–13)	did not advance		
Claire Sharpe; Linda Cloutier	Women's doubles	Sarah Doody; Lesley Roberts (WAL); W (15–3, 15–12)	Barbara Beckett; Holly Lane (NIR); W (15–9, 15–1)	Gillian Clark; Gillian Gowers (ENG); L (15–10, 15–6)	Helen Troke; Fiona Elliott (ENG); L (15–8, 15–11)	4
Denyse Julien; Johanne Falardeau	Women's doubles	Christine Heatly; Aileen Nairn (SCO); W (15–3, 15–8)	Rhonda Cator; Audrey Tuckey (AUS); W (18–13, 15–11)	Helen Troke; Fiona Elliott (ENG); W (15–11, 15–2)	Gillian Clark; Gillian Gowers (ENG); L (15–6, 15–7)	(silver)
Ken Poole; Linda Cloutier	Mixed doubles	Ken Middlemiss; Alieen Nairn (SCO); W (15–9, 15–10)	Richard Outterside; Gillian Clark (ENG); W (6–15, 15–6, 15–7)	Michael Scandolera; Audrey Tuckey (AUS); L (15–12, 12–15, 15–2)	Billy Gilliland; Christine Heatly (SCO); L (15–12, 17–14)	4
John Goss; Sandra Skillings	Mixed doubles	Glenn Stewart; Karen Phillips (NZL); L (15–5, 15–10)	did not advance			
Canada	Mixed team	—N/a	Isle of Man; W 5–0; Scotland; W 3-2	Australia; W 5–0	England; L 5–0	(silver)

== Boxing ==
Men

Athlete	Event	Quarterfinals	Semifinals	Final	
Athlete	Event	Opposition Result	Opposition Result	Opposition Result	Rank
Scotty Olson	Light flyweight (48kg)	—N/a	Johnston Todd (NIR) W	Mark Epton (ENG) W	(gold)
Steve Beaupré	Flyweight (51kg)	Andrew Docherty (SCO) W	John Lyon (ENG) L	did not advance	(bronze)
Chuck Evans	Bantamweight (54kg)	Roy Nash (NIR) L	did not advance		
Bill Downey	Featherweight (57kg)	Roger Spiteri (AUS) W	John Wallace (NZL) W	Peter English (ENG) W	(gold)
Asif Dar	Lightweight (60kg)	Gerard McKenna (NIR) W	Joseph Jacobs (ENG) W	Neil Haddock (WAL) W	(gold)
Howard Grant	Light welterweight (63.5kg)	Musa Lushabab (SAM) W	Brendan Lowe (NIR) W	David Clencie (AUS) W	(gold)
John Shaw	Welterweight (67kg)	Tauvela Ioane (SAM) W	James McAllister (SCO) L	did not advance	(bronze)
Dan Sherry	Light middleweight (71kg)	Brendan O'Hara (NIR) W	Glyn Thomas (WAL) W	Rick Finch (AUS) W	(gold)
Eggerton Marcus	Middleweight (75kg)	Rod Douglas (ENG) L	did not advance		
Brent Kosolofski	Light heavyweight (81kg)	Raeli Raeli (NZL) W	Jim Moran (ENG) L	did not advance	(bronze)
Dominic d'Amico	Heavyweight (91kg)	—N/a	Jimmy Peau (NZL) L	did not advance	(bronze)
Lennox Lewis	Super Heavyweight (>91kg)	—N/a	James Ayebola (ENG) W	Aneurin Evan (WAL) W	(gold)

== Cycling ==
Men

Athlete	Event	Heat		Quarterfinal		Semifinal		Final/Bronze Medal Match	
Athlete	Event	Time/ Score	Rank	Time/ Score	Result	Time/ Score	Result	Time/ Score	Rank
Paul Manson	Time trial	—N/a						1:07.83	5
Curtis Harnett	Time trial	—N/a						1:07.89	7
Gary Altwasser	Time trial	—N/a						1:08.85	11
Alex Ongaro	Sprint	Q		2-0	W	2-1	W	2-1	(silver)
Curtis Harnett	Sprint	Q		2-1	L	did not advance			
Paul Manson	Individual pursuit	5:03.87	9	did not advance					
Patrick Beauchemin	Individual pursuit	5:06.69	11	did not advance					
Jacques Naubert	Individual pursuit	5:08.47	14	did not advance					
Mitchell Smith	Individual pursuit	5:53.66	18	did not advance					
Patrick Beauchemin; Paul Manson; Todd McNutt; Gianni Vignaduzzi	Team pursuit	4:38.16	Q	—N/a		L		L	4
Patrick Beauchemin	10 miles scratch	—N/a						-	5
Gianni Vignaduzzi	10 miles scratch	—N/a						-	6
Gary Altwasser	10 miles scratch	—N/a						-	unplaced
?	10 miles scratch	—N/a						-	unplaced
Dany Deslongchamps; Paul Murray; Bruce Spicer; Yvan Waddell	Road team time trial	—N/a						2:18.19	5
Gervais Rioux	Road race	—N/a						4:13:88	18

== Lawn bowls ==
The lawn bowls were held at Balgreen.

Men

Athlete	Event	Round Robin												Rank
Athlete	Event	Score	Score	Score	Score	Score	Score	Score	Score	Score	Score	Score	Score	Rank
Alf Wallace	Singles	Hill (WAL); W 21 - 18	Corsie (SCO); W 21 - 19	Espie (NIR); W 21 - 14	Young (MAW); W 21 - 10	Dickison (NZL); L 21 - 20	Le Marquand (JEY); W 21 – 6	Bosley (HKG); W 21 – 5	Mike Smith (GGY); W 21 – 18	Fong (FIJ); W 21 – 19	Thomson (ENG); L 21 – 14	Schuback (AUS); L 21 – 5	L 21 – 14	4
Ronnie Jones; Bill Boettger	Pairs	Wales; W 21 - 14	Scotland; L 24 - 17	Northern Ireland; W 19 - 10	New Zealand; W 19 - 17	Malawi; W 18 - 10	Jersey; W 31 – 11	Botswana; L 22 – 21	Australia; W 21 – 12	England; L 26 – 17	Fiji; W 20 – 12	Guernsey; W 21 – 15	Hong Kong; W 23 – 14	(silver)
Dan Milligan; Dave Brown; Dave Houtby; Dave Duncalf	Fours	Wales; D 17 - 17	Swaziland; W 35 - 0	Scotland; W 30 - 14	Northern Ireland; W 26 - 14	New Zealand; L 20 - 14	Hong Kong; L 27 – 19	Guernsey; W 28 – 17	Fiji; W 23 – 15	England; L 23 – 19	Botswana; W 17 – 15	Australia; L 18 – 15	—N/a	(silver)

Women

Athlete	Event	Round Robin												Rank
Athlete	Event	Score	Score	Score	Score	Score	Score	Score	Score	Score	Score	Score	Score	Rank
Nell Hunter	Singles	Dainton (WAL); L 21 - 1	McCrone (SCO); L 21 - 20	Ryan (NZL); L 27 - 7	Bell (NIR); L 21 - 20	Blattman (JEY); W 21 – 18	Anderson (BOT); L 21 – 16	Humphreys (HKG); W 21 – 7	Tissier (GGY); W 21 – 1	Lum On (FIJ); W 21 – 13	Line (ENG); W 21 – 15	Fahey (AUS); W 21 – 12	—N/a	4
Dorothy Macey; Alice Duncalf	Pairs	Wales; W 19 - 16	Scotland; W 17 - 13	Northern Ireland; L 27 - 23	New Zealand; L 23 - 19	Hong Kong; L 21 - 10	Canada; W 27 – 19	Guernsey; L 19 – 18	England; L 24 – 12	Botswana; W 23 – 14	Australia; W 29 – 12	—N/a		7
Dorothy Mogridge; Elaine Jones; Jean Wintermute; Mari Paterson	Fours	Swaziland; W 22 – 11	Guernsey; L 20 - 12	Scotland; L 21 - 16	Botswana; L 23 - 10	Northern Ireland; W 28 - 13	Malawi; W 25 - 24	New Zealand; L 21 – 15	Hong Kong; L 21 – 20	Wales; L 33 – 12	England; L 23 – 9	Australia; L 17 – 15	Fiji; D	12

== Rowing ==
The women's eights team finished third however no medal was awarded as there were not enough teams competing.

Men

Athlete	Event	Heat		Repechage		Final	
Athlete	Event	Time	Rank	Time	Rank	Time	Rank
Mike Hughes	Single sculls	7:38.96	3	7:30.01	3 Q	7:49.04	5
Pat Walker; Bruce Ford	Double sculls	7:15.91	1 Q	—N/a		6:19.43	(gold)
Dave Johnson; Harold Backer	Coxless pairs	7:49.93	2	7:10.81	1 Q	6:46.41	4
Pat Turner; Kevin Neufeld; Paul Steele; Grant Main	Coxless fours	6:38.87	1 Q	—N/a		6:00.56	(gold)
Bruce Robertson; Ian McKerlich; John Wallace; Darby Berhout; Tan Barkley	Coxed fours	7:06.41	1 Q	—N/a		6:14.66	4
John Ossowski; Eric Kovits; John Houlding; Dave Ross; Andy Crosby; Mark Fortune; Jason Dorland; Don Telfer; Brian McMahon	Eights	—N/a				5:47.99	4
Peter Tatersall	Lightweight single sculls	7:12.68	2	7:21.39	1 Q	7:26.65	(silver)
Bob Thomas; Ryan Tierney; Brian Peaker; Dave Henry	Lightweight coxless fours	—N/a				6:35.66	(bronze)

Women

Athlete	Event	Final	
Athlete	Event	Time	Rank
Lisa Wright	Single sculls	7:48.90	(silver)
Heather Clarke; Lisa Robertson	Double sculls	7:39.86	(silver)
Kathryn Barr; Andrea Schreiner	Coxless pairs	7:34.51	(gold)
Jane Tregunno; Jenny Wallinga; Tina Clarke; Tricia Smith; Lesley Thompson	Coxed fours	6:50.13	(gold)
Sandy Coppinger; Gil Saxby; Carla Pace; Cathy Harry; Angie Schneider; Brenda Taylor; Sarah Ogilvy; Cathy Lund; Susan Beck	Eights	6:51.81	3
Heather Hattin	Lightweight single sculls	7:52.14	(bronze)
Wendy Wiebe; Marlene Vanderhorst; Anne Dorst; Marnie Hamilton	Lightweight coxless fours	7:01.18	(bronze)

== Shooting ==
Open events
Pistol

Athlete	Event	Final	
Athlete	Event	Points	Rank
Tom Guinn	Free Pistol	547	5
Claude Beaulieu	Free Pistol	538	8
Tom Guinn; Claude Beaulieu	Free Pistol – Pairs	1099	(gold)
Sherman Arnold	Centre-Fire Pistol	569	12
Mark Howkins	Rapid-Fire Pistol	585	(bronze)
Andre Chevrefils	Rapid-Fire Pistol	581	6
Mark Howkins; Andre Chevrefils	Rapid-Fire Pistol – Pairs	1150	(bronze)
Tom Guinn	Air Pistol	574	(silver)
Robert Horne	Air Pistol	565	8
Tom Guinn; Robert Horne	Air Pistol – Pairs	1136	4

Rifle

Athlete	Event	Final	
Athlete	Event	Points	Rank
Gale Stewart	Rifle Prone	597	4
Michael Ashcroft	Rifle Prone	593	11
Michael Ashcroft; Gale Stewart	Rifle Prone – Pairs	1175	(gold)
Jean-François Sénécal	Rifle Three Positions	1150	(bronze)
Michel Dion	Rifle Three Positions	1148	4
Michel Dion; Jean-François Sénécal	Rifle Three Positions – Pairs	2276	(silver)
Alain Marion	Full Bore Rifle	253	(silver)
Wilf Baldwin	Full Bore Rifle	247	15
Alain Marion; Wilf Baldwin	Full Bore Rifle – Pairs	583	(gold)
Guy Lorion	Air Rifle	588	(gold)
Sharon Bowes	Air Rifle	583	(silver)
Guy Lorion; Sharon Bowes	Air Rifle – Pairs	1167	(gold)

Shotgun

Athlete	Event	Final	
Athlete	Event	Points	Rank
George Leary	Trap	94	6
John Primrose	Trap	92	2
John Primrose; George Leary	Trap – Pairs	183	4
Brian Gabriel	Skeet	195	(bronze)
Don Kwasnycia	Skeet	190	9
Brian Gabriel; Don Kwasnycia	Skeet – Pairs	193	(silver)

== Weightlifting ==
Athlete	Event	Weight Lifted		Total	Rank
Athlete	Event	Snatch	Clean & jerk	Total	Rank
Langis Cote	67.5kg	130	160	290	(bronze)
Louis Payer	75kg	135	165	300	(silver)
Neale McDevitt	82.5kg	130	175	305	5
Gilles Poirier	82.5kg	135	170	305	6
Guy Greavette	90kg	155	185	340	(bronze)
Gabriel Leduc	90kg	150	170	320	4
Denis Garon	100kg	155	205	355	(gold)
Paramajit Gill	100kg	145	180	325	4
Kevin Roy	110kg	165	210	375	(gold)
David Bolduc	110kg +	157.5	190	347.5	(silver)

== Wrestling ==
Athlete	Event	Group rounds		Finals	
Athlete	Event	Opposition Result	Opposition Result	Opposition Result	Rank
Ron Moncur	Light flyweight (48kg)	Duncan Burns (ENG) W	David Connelly (SCO) L	—N/a	(gold)
Chris Woodcroft	Flyweight (52kg)	—N/a	Nigel Donohue (ENG) W	James McAlary (AUS) W	(gold)
Mitch Ostberg	Bantamweight (57kg)	Paul Kirkby (AUS) W	Brian Aspen (ENG) W	Stephen Reinfield (NZL) W	(gold)
Paul Hughes	Featherweight (62kg)	Mark Bowman (NIR) W	Stephen Bell (NZL) W	Dan Cumming (AUS) W	(gold)
Dave McKay	Lightweight (68kg)	—N/a	Steven Cooper (ENG) W	Zsigi Kelevitz (AUS) W	(gold)
Gary Holmes	Welterweight (74kg)	—N/a	Fitz Walker (ENG) W	Geoff Marsh (AUS) W	(gold)
Chris Rinke	Middleweight (82kg)	Eddie Cusak (NIR) W	Tony Bull (ENG) W	Wally Koenig (AUS) W	(gold)
Doug Cox	Light heavyweight (90kg)	—N/a	Graham English (SCO) W	Noel Loban (ENG) L	(silver)
Clark Davis	Heavyweight (100kg)	Ivan Weir (NIR) W	Gabriel Toth (AUS) W	Robert Algie (NZL) W	(gold)
Wayne Brightwell	Super heavyweight (130kg)	—N/a	Keith Peache (ENG) W	Albert Patrick (SCO) W	(gold)
