= New Zealand at the 1986 Commonwealth Games =

- CGF code: NZL
- CGA: New Zealand Olympic and Commonwealth Games Association
- Website: www.olympic.org.nz

in Edinburgh, Scotland
- Competitors: 127
- Flag bearer: Stephanie Foster
- Officials: 45
- Medals Ranked 4th: Gold 8 Silver 16 Bronze 14 Total 38

Commonwealth Games appearances (overview)
- 1930; 1934; 1938; 1950; 1954; 1958; 1962; 1966; 1970; 1974; 1978; 1982; 1986; 1990; 1994; 1998; 2002; 2006; 2010; 2014; 2018; 2022; 2026; 2030

New Zealand at the 1986 Commonwealth Games was represented by a team of 127 competitors and 45 officials. Selection of the team for the Games in Edinburgh, Scotland, was the responsibility of the New Zealand Olympic and Commonwealth Games Association. New Zealand's flagbearer at the opening and closing ceremonies was sculler Stephanie Foster. The New Zealand team finished fourth on the medal table, winning a total of 38 medals, eight of which were gold.

New Zealand has competed in every games, starting with the British Empire Games in 1930 at Hamilton, Ontario.

== Medal tables ==
Medal	Name	Sport	Event
Gold	Jimmy Peau	Boxing	Men's heavyweight
Gold	Ian Dickison	Lawn bowls	Men's singles
Gold	Robin Clarke; Stephanie Foster	Rowing	Women's double scull
Gold	Stephanie Foster	Rowing	Women's single scull
Gold	Greg Yelavich	Shooting	Open air pistol
Gold	Greg Yelavich	Shooting	Open free pistol
Gold	Sylvia Hume	Swimming	Women's 100 m backstroke
Gold	Anthony Mosse	Swimming	Men's 200 m butterfly
Silver	Anne Audain	Athletics	Women's 10,000 m
Silver	Lorraine Moller	Athletics	Women's marathon
Silver	Gary Anderson	Cycling	Men's 1 km time trial
Silver	Gary Anderson; Russell Clune; Stephen Swart; Andrew Whitford	Cycling	Men's 4000 m team pursuit
Silver	Blair Cox; Greg Fraine; Paul Leitch; Graeme Miller	Cycling	Men's 100 km team time trial
Silver	Brian Fowler	Cycling	Men's individual road race
Silver	Nigel Atherfold; Andrew Bird; Bruce Holden; Greg Johnston; Chris White	Rowing	Men's coxed four
Silver	Philippa Baker; Andrew Bird; Bruce Holden; Greg Johnston; Chris White	Rowing	Women's lightweight single scull
Silver	Neil Gibson; Shane O'Brien; Andrew Stevenson; Don Symon	Rowing	Men's coxless four
Silver	Barrie Mabbott; Ian Wright	Rowing	Men's coxless pair
Silver	Paul Kingsman	Swimming	Men's 100 m backstroke
Silver	Paul Kingsman	Swimming	Men's 200 m backstroke
Silver	Anthony Mosse	Swimming	Men's 100 m butterfly
Silver	Clayton Chelley	Weightlifting	Men's bantamweight
Silver	Robert Algie	Wrestling	Men's heavyweight
Silver	Steve Reinsfield	Wrestling	Men's bantamweight
Bronze	Gavin Lovegrove	Athletics	Men's javelin throw
Bronze	Simon Poelman	Athletics	Men's decathlon
Bronze	Kerrin Harrison; Glenn Stewart	Badminton	Men's doubles
Bronze	Johnny Wallace	Boxing	Men's featherweight
Bronze	Gary Anderson	Cycling	Men's 10 mile scratch race
Bronze	Gary Anderson	Cycling	Men's 4000 m individual pursuit
Bronze	Mike Burrell; Neil Gibson; Andy Hay; Barrie Mabbott; Shane O'Brien; Andrew Stevenson; Don Symon; Carl Vincent; Ian Wright	Rowing	Men's eight
Bronze	Eric Verdonk	Rowing	Men's single scull
Bronze	John Farrell; John Woolley	Shooting	Open skeet pairs
Bronze	Rex Hamilton; Barry O'Neale	Shooting	Open centre-fire pistol pairs
Bronze	Barrie Wickins; Greg Yelavich	Shooting	Open air pistol pairs
Bronze	Mike Davidson	Swimming	Men's 400 m freestyle
Bronze	Katie Sadleir	Synchronised swimming	Women's solo
Bronze	Stephen Bell	Wrestling	Men's featherweight

Medals by sport
Sport	Gold medal	Silver medal	Bronze medal	Total
Rowing	2	4	2	8
Swimming	2	3	1	6
Shooting	2	0	3	5
Boxing	1	0	1	2
Lawn bowls	1	0	0	1
Cycling	0	4	2	6
Athletics	0	2	2	4
Wrestling	0	2	1	3
Weightlifting	0	1	0	1
Badminton	0	0	1	1
Synchronised swimming	0	0	1	1
Total	8	16	14	38

Medals by gender
Gender	Gold medal	Silver medal	Bronze medal	Total
Male	3	13	10	26
Female	3	3	1	7
Mixed / open	2	0	3	5
Total	8	16	14	38

== Competitors ==
The following table lists the number of New Zealand competitors participating at the Games according to gender and sport.

Sport	Men	Women	Total
Athletics	13	12	25
Badminton	4	4	8
Boxing	5	—N/a	5
Cycling	15	—N/a	15
Diving	2	1	3
Lawn bowls	7	7	14
Rowing	21	2	23
Shooting	11	0	11
Swimming	9	4	13
Synchronised swimming	—N/a	1	1
Weightlifting	4	—N/a	4
Wrestling	5	—N/a	5
Total	96	31	127

== Athletics ==
=== Track and road ===
Athlete	Event	Heat		Final	
Athlete	Event	Result	Rank (Note: Ranks given are within the heat)	Result	Rank
Anne Audain	Women's 10,000 m	—N/a		31:53.31	2nd place, silver medalist(s)
John Bowden	Men's 10,000 m	—N/a		29:25.65	9
David Burridge	Men's 5000 m	—N/a		13:36.79	6
John Campbell	Men's marathon	—N/a		2:21:25	13
Murray Day	Men's 30 km walk	—N/a		2:15:11	6
Debbie Elsmore	Women's 10,000 m	—N/a		DNF	
Terry Genge	Women's 100 m hurdles	14.06	8	did not advance	
Michael Gilchrist	Men's 1500 m	3:45.91	6	did not advance	
Michael Gilchrist	Men's 3000 m steeplechase	—N/a		8:43.96	6
Anne Hare	Women's 1500 m	4:14.44	5 q	4:17.56	9
Christine McMiken	Women's 10,000 m	—N/a		DNF	
Lorraine Moller	Women's 3000 m	—N/a		9:03.89	5
Lorraine Moller	Women's marathon	—N/a		2:28:17	2nd place, silver medalist(s)
Mary O'Connor	Women's marathon	—N/a		2:46.48	9
Wayne Paul	Men's 5000 m	53.39	4	did not advance	
Christine Pfitzinger	Women's 1500 m	4:27.70	4 Q	4:16.81	6
Christine Pfitzinger	Women's 3000 m	—N/a		9:09.35	6
Peter Renner	Men's 1500 m	3:47.06	9	did not advance	
Peter Renner	Men's 3000 m steeplechase	—N/a		8:27.12	4
Kerry Rodger	Men's 5000 m	—N/a		13:52.04	11
Graham Seatter	Men's 30 km walk	—N/a		2:22:48	9
Lynette Stock	Women's 100 m hurdles	13.67	5	did not advance	
John Walker	Men's 5000 m	—N/a		13:35.34	5

=== Field ===
Athlete	Event	Final	
Athlete	Event	Result	Rank
Gavin Lovegrove	Men's javelin throw	76.22 m	3rd place, bronze medalist(s)
Jayne Mitchell	Women's long jump	6.19 m	6
Lyn Osmers	Women's javelin throw	38.70 m	12
John Stapylton-Smith	Men's javelin throw	65.76 m	9
Trudy Woodhead	Women's high jump	1.86 m	6

=== Combined ===
Men's decathlon

Athlete	100 m	Long jump	Shot put	High jump	400 m	110 m hurdles	Discus throw	Pole vault	Javelin throw	1500 m	Overall points	Rank
Simon Poelman	10.80; 906 pts	7.02 m 818 pts	14.32 m 748 pts	2.05 m 850 pts	51.07; 766 pts	14.51; 910 pts	44.40 m 754 pts	4.80 m 849 pts	56.68 m 688 pts	4:32.87; 726 pts	8015 pts	3rd place, bronze medalist(s)

Women's heptathlon

Athlete	100 m hurdles	Shot put	High jump	200 m	Long jump	Javelin throw	800 m	Overall points	Rank
Terry Genge	13.92; 990 pts	13.22 m 742 pts	1.61 m 747 pts	25.60; 833 pts	6.02 m 856 pts	34.68 m 566 pts	2:14.62; 898 pts	5632 pts	6
Lyn Osmers	15.21; 814 pts	11.33 m 617 pts	1.79 m 966 pts	26.38; 764 pts	5.75 m 774 pts	48.74 m 836 pts	2:26.29; 740 pts	5511 pts	7

== Badminton ==
=== Singles ===
Athlete	Event	Round of 64	Round of 32	Round of 16	Quarterfinal	Semifinal	Final / BM	Rank
Athlete	Event	Opposition Result	Opposition Result	Opposition Result	Opposition Result	Opposition Result	Opposition Result	Rank
Kerrin Harrison	Men's singles	Bye	Rees (WAL); W 9–15 15–10 15–5	Butler (CAN); L 5–15 8–15	did not advance			
Phil Horne	Men's singles	Bye	Sutton (WAL); W 15–12 15–11	Scandolera (AUS); W W/O	Yates (ENG); L 2–15 2–15	did not advance		
Katrin Lockey	Women's singles	Bye	Gammie (GUE); W 11–0 11–0	Troke (ENG); L 4–11 1–11	did not advance			
Karen Phillips	Women's singles	Bye	Clark (ENG); L 3–11 2–11	did not advance				
Graeme Robson	Men's singles	Bye	Tse (HKG); W 15–4 15–5	McKenna (GUE); W 15–3 15–4	Baddeley (ENG); L 5–15 9–15	did not advance		
Glenn Stewart	Men's singles	Bye	Le Tisser (GUE); W 15–0 15–5	Sze (AUS); L 8–15 1–15	did not advance			
Toni Whittaker	Women's singles	Bye	Tong (HKG); W 12–9 11–5	Gowers (ENG); L 2–11 8–11	did not advance			

=== Doubles ===
Athlete	Event	Round of 32	Round of 16	Quarterfinal	Semifinal	Final / BM	Rank
Athlete	Event	Opposition Result	Opposition Result	Opposition Result	Opposition Result	Opposition Result	Rank
Kerrin Harrison; Glenn Stewart	Men's doubles	Sutton / Spencer (WAL); W 15–10 15–9	Podger / Stuart (GUE); W 15–1 15–5	De Belle / Bitten (CAN); W 12–15 15–10 18–13	Goode / Tier (ENG); L 9–15 5–15	Scandolera / Kong (AUS); W 15–12 15–11	3rd place, bronze medalist(s)
Phil Horne; Graeme Robson	Men's doubles	Bye	Gilliland / Travers (SCO); L 2–15 15–11 14–18	did not advance			
Katrin Lockey; Toni Whittaker	Women's doubles	—N/a	Chan / Poon (HKG); W 18–14 15–7	Troke / Elliott (ENG); L 12–15 5–15	did not advance		
Karen Phillips; Ann Stephens (NIR)	Women's doubles	—N/a	Troke / Elliott (ENG); L 4–15 2–15	did not advance			
Phil Horne; Katrin Lockey	Mixed doubles	Pringle / Allen (SCO); L 15–11 13–18 5–15	did not advance				
Graeme Robson; Toni Whittaker	Mixed doubles	Butler / Sharpe (CAN); L 10–15 12–15	did not advance				
Glenn Stewart; Karen Phillips	Mixed doubles	Keag / Stephens (NIR); W 15–8 5–15 15–9	Goss / Skillings (CAN); W 15–5 15–10	Gilliland / Heatly (SCO); L 5–15 3–15	did not advance		

=== Teams ===
Athlete	Event	Group stage				Semifinal	Final / BM	Rank
Athlete	Event	Opposition Result	Opposition Result	Opposition Result	Opposition Result	Opposition Result	Opposition Result	Rank
Kerrin Harrison; Phil Horne; Katrin Lockey; Karen Phillips; Graeme Robson; Glenn Stewart; Toni Whittaker	Mixed team	England; L 1–4	Australia; L 1–4	Northern Ireland; W 5–0	Wales; W 5–0	did not advance		

== Boxing ==
Athlete	Event	Round of 16	Quarterfinal	Semifinal	Final	Rank
Athlete	Event	Opposition Result	Opposition Result	Opposition Result	Opposition Result	Rank
Shane Buckley	Bantamweight	Evans (CAN); L	did not advance			
Johnny Wallace	Featherweight	Bye	Mkangala (MAW); W	Downey (CAN); L	Did not advance	3rd place, bronze medalist(s)
Apelu Ioane	Light welterweight	Bye	Clencie (AUS); L	did not advance		
Raeli Raeli	Light heavyweight	—N/a	Kosolofski (CAN); L	did not advance		
Jimmy Peau	Heavyweight	—N/a	Bye	D'Amico (CAN); W	Young (SCO); W	1st place, gold medalist(s)

== Cycling ==
=== Road ===
Athlete	Event	Time	Rank
Stephen Cox	Men's individual road race	4:11:25	7
Brian Fowler	Men's individual road race	4:08:50	2nd place, silver medalist(s)
Craig Griffin	Men's individual road race	4:12:47	11
Graeme Miller	Men's individual road race	4:11:19	5
Blair Cox; Greg Fraine; Paul Leitch; Graeme Miller	Men's 100 km team time trial	2:14:50	2nd place, silver medalist(s)

=== Track ===
Men's 1000 m sprint

Athlete	Round 1	First-round repechages	Round 2	Second-round repechages	Quarterfinals	Semifinals	Final / BM	Rank
Athlete	Opposition Result	Opposition Result	Opposition Result	Opposition Result	Opposition Result	Opposition Result	Opposition Result	Rank
Mike McRedmond	L	W	L	W	Neiwand (AUS); L, L	did not advance		6
William Rastrick	W	Bye	L	W	Alexander (SCO); L, L	did not advance		5
Murray Steele	L	W	L	L	did not advance			

Men's 1 km time trial

Athlete	Time	Rank
Gary Anderson	1:06.334	2nd place, silver medalist(s)
Pierre Jordan	1:08.633	9
Murray Steele	1:08.661	10

Men's 4000 m pursuit

Athlete	Event	Qualification		Quarterfinals	Semifinals	Final / BM	Rank
Athlete	Event	Time	Rank	Opponent Result	Opponent Result	Opponent Result	Rank
Gary Anderson	Individual pursuit	4:54.87	4 Q	Patterson (AUS); W 4:52.11	Sturgess (ENG); L	Muzio (ENG); W 4:51.073	3rd place, bronze medalist(s)
Stephen Swart	Individual pursuit	5:04.27	10	did not advance			
Andrew Whitford	Individual pursuit	4:56.08	6 Q	Sturgess (ENG); L	did not advance		6
Gary Anderson; Russell Clune; Stephen Swart; Andrew Whitford	Team pursuit	4:29.87	2 Q	—N/a	England; W 4:29.17	Australia; L	2nd place, silver medalist(s)

Men's 10 miles scratch race

Athlete	Time	Rank
Gary Anderson		3rd place, bronze medalist(s)
Murray Steele		11
Mike McRedmond	DNF	
William Rastrick	DNF	

== Diving ==
Athlete	Event	Points	Rank
Nicky Cooney	Women's 3 m springboard	469.62	5
Mark Graham	Men's 3 m springboard	478.14	13
Raymond Vallance	Men's 3 m springboard	528.21	9
Raymond Vallance	Men's 10 m platform	449.37	11

== Lawn bowls ==
Athlete	Event	Round robin												Rank
Athlete	Event	Opposition Score	Opposition Score	Opposition Score	Opposition Score	Opposition Score	Opposition Score	Opposition Score	Opposition Score	Opposition Score	Opposition Score	Opposition Score	Opposition Score	Rank
Ian Dickison	Men's singles	Young (MAW); W 21–16	Thomson (ENG); W 21–20	Bosley (HKG); W 21–4	Smith (GUE); W 21–8	Fong (FIJ); W 21–14	Le Marquand (JER); W 21–12	Wallace (CAN); W 21–20	David (BOT); W 21–16	Schuback (AUS); W 21–10	Hill (WAL); W 21–15	Corsie (SCO); W 21–12	Espie (NIR); L 18–21	1st place, gold medalist(s)
Maurice Symes; Wayne Nairn	Men's pairs	Jersey; D 21–21	Australia; W 23–18	Fiji; W 23–17	Northern Ireland; L 12–20	England; L 15–22	Canada; L 17–19	Botswana; W 25–14	Wales; L 15–24	Guernsey; W 24–21	Malawi; W 25–14	Scotland; L 13–17	Hong Kong; L 20–23	7
Stewart McConnell; Keith Slight; John Murtagh; Morgan Moffat	Men's fours	Northern Ireland; L 13–27	Guernsey; W 17–13	Hong Kong; W 21–18	Fiji; W 32–10	England; W 22–19	Canada; W 20–14	Botswana; L 16–23	Australia; L 17–23	Wales; L 15–21	Swaziland; W 29–14	Scotland; W 25–17	—N/a	4
Rhoda Ryan	Women's singles	Blattman (JER); W 21–16	McCrone (SCO); L 18–21	Le Tissier (GUE); W 21–10	Humphreys (HKG); L 14–21	Lum On (FIJ); L 20–21	Hunter (CAN); W 21–7	Line (ENG); L 4–21	Anderson (BOT); L 18–21	Fahey (AUS); L 19–21	Dainton (WAL); W 21–5	Bell (NIR); W 21–19	—N/a	9
Joyce Osborne; Millie Khan	Women's pairs	Fiji; W 26–12	Hong Kong; L 14–25	Guernsey; L 16–21	Northern Ireland; L	England; L	Canada; W 23–19	Botswana; W 36–8	Australia; W 19–16	Wales; W 26–19	Scotland; L 20–22	—N/a		6
Daphne Le Breton; Vera Bindon; Denise Page; Jennifer Simpson	Women's fours	Australia; L 13–27	Scotland; L 18–22	Hong Kong; W 28–19	Guernsey; W 21–12	England; L 9–32	Fiji; L 15–29	Canada; W 21–15	Botswana; W 26–18	Malawi; W 30–11	Wales; L 14–17	Northern Ireland; W 24–16	Swaziland; W 33–10	5

== Rowing ==
Athlete	Event	Heats		Repechage		Final	
Athlete	Event	Time	Rank	Time	Rank	Time	Rank
Eric Verdonk	Men's single scull	7:23.74	2 R	7:22.38	1 Q	7:39.11	3rd place, bronze medalist(s)
Stephanie Foster	Women's single scull	—N/a				7:43.22 GR	1st place, gold medalist(s)
Dale Maher; Eric Verdonk	Men's double scull	7:24.70	2 R	6:46.44	2 Q	6:28.95	4
Robin Clarke; Stephanie Foster	Women's double scull	—N/a				7:21.52	1st place, gold medalist(s)
Dale Maher	Men's lightweight single scull	7:41.55	3 R	7:33.50	4 Q	7:44.14	6
Philippa Baker	Women's lightweight single scull	—N/a				7:45.82	2nd place, silver medalist(s)
Barrie Mabbott; Ian Wright	Men's coxless pair	7:27.76	2 R	7:15.78	2 Q	6:42.63	2nd place, silver medalist(s)
Andrew Stevenson; Don Symon; Neil Gibson; Shane O'Brien	Men's coxless four	6:42.41	1 Q	Bye		6:00.85	2nd place, silver medalist(s)
Bruce Holden; Chris White; Greg Johnston; Nigel Atherfold; Andrew Bird (cox)	Men's coxed four	6:30.99	2 R	6:48.30	2 Q	6:09.89	2nd place, silver medalist(s)
Gary Hay; Martin Eade; Michael Westenra; Simon Koller	Men's lightweight coxless four	—N/a				6:37.14	4
Andrew Stevenson; Barrie Mabbott; Carl Vincent; Don Symon; Ian Wright; Mike Burrell; Neil Gibson; Shane O'Brien; Andy Hay (cox)	Men's eight	—N/a				5:47.97	3rd place, bronze medalist(s)

== Shooting ==
=== Pistol ===
Athlete	Event	Points	Rank
Rex Hamilton	Open centre-fire pistol	579	4
Rex Hamilton	Open free pistol	547	4
Barry O'Neale	Open centre-fire pistol	577	5
Barry O'Neale	Open rapid-fire pistol	567	14
Barrie Wickins	Open air pistol	570	6
Greg Yelavich	Open air pistol	575	1st place, gold medalist(s)
Greg Yelavich	Open free pistol	551	1st place, gold medalist(s)
Barrie Wickins; Greg Yelavich	Open air pistol pairs	1140	3rd place, bronze medalist(s)
Rex Hamilton; Barry O'Neale	Open centre-fire pistol pairs	1153	3rd place, bronze medalist(s)
Rex Hamilton; Greg Yelavich	Open free pistol pairs	1067	5

=== Rifle ===
Athlete	Event	Points	Rank
Eddie Adlam	Open air rifle	574	8
Eddie Adlam	Open small-bore rifle 3 position	1136	6
Chester Burt	Open full-bore rifle	389	11
Frank Godfrey	Open full-bore rifle	388	14
Roger Harvey	Open small-bore rifle prone	593	13
Stephen Petterson	Open air rifle	561	13
Stephen Petterson	Open small-bore rifle prone	594	8
Eddie Adlam; Stephen Petterson	Open air rifle pair	1118	7
Eddie Adlam; Stephen Petterson	Open small-bore rifle 3 position pair	2198	6
Chester Burt; Frank Godfrey	Open full-bore rifle pairs	582	5
Roger Harvey; Stephen Petterson	Open small-bore rifle prone pair	1162	=4

=== Shotgun ===
Athlete	Event	Points	Rank
John Farrell	Open skeet	192	7
John Woolley	Open skeet	194	4
John Farrell; John Woolley	Open skeet pairs	189	3rd place, bronze medalist(s)

== Swimming ==
Athlete	Event	Heat		Final	
Athlete	Event	Result	Rank	Result	Rank
Ross Anderson	Men's 100 m butterfly	55.66	6 Q	55.93	7
Ross Anderson	Men's 200 m butterfly	2:03.01	6 Q	2:02.96	8
Ross Anderson	Men's 100 m freestyle	52.83	12	did not advance	
Carmel Clark	Women's 100 m backstroke	1:05.49	7 Q	1:05.34	7
Carmel Clark	Women's 200 m backstroke	2:19.36	4 Q	2:19.29	5
Carmel Clark	Women's 200 m individual medley	2:24.43	11	did not advance	
Mike Davidson	Men's 200 m freestyle	1:57.89	13	did not advance	
Mike Davidson	Men's 400 m freestyle	3:58.96	6 Q	3:56.96	3rd place, bronze medalist(s)
Mike Davidson	Men's 1500 m freestyle	15:55.23	7 Q	15:38.54	6
Grant Forbes	Men's 100 m breaststroke	1:05.89	8 Q	1:06.34	8
Grant Forbes	Men's 200 m breaststroke	2:24.89	12	did not advance	
Brent Foster	Men's 200 m freestyle	1:59.07	16	did not advance	
Brent Foster	Men's 400 m freestyle	4:15.75	14	did not advance	
Brent Foster	Men's 200 m individual medley	2:14.25	13	did not advance	
Brent Foster	Men's 400 m individual medley	4:43.33	11	did not advance	
Sylvia Hume	Women's 100 m backstroke	1:05.02	3 Q	1:04.00	1st place, gold medalist(s)
Sylvia Hume	Women's 200 m backstroke	2:21.95	9	did not advance	
Sylvia Hume	Women's 100 m freestyle	1:01.83	22	did not advance	
Gary Hurring	Men's 100 m backstroke	58.97	11	did not advance	
Gary Hurring	Men's 200 m backstroke	2:10.20	14	did not advance	
Paul Kingsman	Men's 100 m backstroke	57.76	2 Q	57.17	2nd place, silver medalist(s)
Paul Kingsman	Men's 200 m backstroke	2:05.19	3 Q	2:02.90	2nd place, silver medalist(s)
Richard Lockhart	Men's 100 m breaststroke	1:06.74	13	did not advance	
Richard Lockhart	Men's 200 m breaststroke	2:25.50	13	did not advance	
Fiona McLay	Women's 100 m freestyle	59.62	11	did not advance	
Fiona McLay	Women's 200 m freestyle	2:04.95	4 Q	2:04.01	4
Fiona McLay	Women's 400 m freestyle	4:32.52	14	did not advance	
Anthony Mosse	Men's 100 m butterfly	54.61	2 Q	54.31	2nd place, silver medalist(s)
Anthony Mosse	Men's 200 m butterfly	2:00.26	2 Q	1:57.27 GR	1st place, gold medalist(s)
Kirk Torrance	Men's 100 m backstroke	58.81	9	did not advance	
Kirk Torrance	Men's 200 m backstroke	2:06.63	8 Q	2:07.79	8
Kirk Torrance	Men's 100 m butterfly	58.10	15	did not advance	
Kerrylyne Torrance	Women's 100 m backstroke	1:06.16	10	did not advance	
Kerrylyne Torrance	Women's 200 m backstroke	2:21.45	7 Q	2:19.87	6
Kerrylyne Torrance	Women's 100 m butterfly	1:05.64	12	did not advance	
Kerrylyne Torrance	Women's 100 m freestyle	1:02.44	24	did not advance	
Paul Kingsman; Anthony Mosse; Grant Forbes; Ross Anderson	Men's 4 × 100 m medley relay	3:54.84	3 Q	3:48.58	4
Carmel Clark; Fiona McLay; Kerrylyne Torrance; Sylvia Hume	Women's 4 × 100 m freestyle relay	—N/a		4:02.43	5

== Synchronised swimming ==
Athlete	Event	Points	Rank
Katie Sadleir	Women's solo	175.08	3rd place, bronze medalist(s)

== Weightlifting ==
Athlete	Event	Snatch	Clean and jerk	Total	Rank
Clayton Chelley	Bantamweight	95.0 kg	122.5 kg	217.5 kg	2nd place, silver medalist(s)
Michael Bernard	Light heavyweight	NVL	DNF		
Allister Nalder	Middle heavyweight	147.5 kg	NVL	DNF	
Kevin Blake	Sub heavyweight	147.5 kg	175.0 kg	322.5 kg	5

== Wrestling ==
Athlete	Event	Group rounds		Final / BM	Rank
Athlete	Event	Opposition Result	Opposition Result	Opposition Result	Rank
Shane Stannett	Flyweight	McAlary (AUS); L	Giordmania (MLT); W	Donohue (ENG); L	4
Steve Reinsfield	Bantamweight	Farrugia (MLT); W	Nedley (SCO); W	Ostberg (CAN); L	2nd place, silver medalist(s)
Stephen Bell	Bantamweight	Bowman (NIR); W	Hughes (CAN); L	Beswick (ENG); W	3rd place, bronze medalist(s)
Zane Coleman	Welterweight	Marsh (AUS); L	McNeil (SCO); L	did not advance	
Robert Algie	Heavyweight	Kilpin (ENG); W	Robertson (SCO); W	Davis (CAN); L	2nd place, silver medalist(s)

== Officials ==
- Team manager – Bruce Ullrich
- Assistant general manager – Graeme McCabe
- Women's manager – Barbara Levido
- Director of medical services – Matt Marshall
- Team doctor – Dave Gerrard
- Physiotherapists – Mark Oram, Ian Sim, Tony Snell, Marion Thogersen
- Athletics section manager – Steve Hollings
- Badminton section manager – Mary Mansell
- Bowls section managers – Kerry Clark, Pat Weaver
- Boxing section manager – Trevor Mitchell
- Cycling section manager – Bruce Dawe
- Rowing section manager – Dudley Storey
- Shooting section manager – Graeme Hudson
- Swimming section manager – David Mahon
- Weightlifting section manager – Bruce Cameron
- Wrestling section manager – Brian Stannett

== See also ==
- New Zealand Olympic Committee
- New Zealand at the Commonwealth Games
- New Zealand at the 1984 Summer Olympics
- New Zealand at the 1988 Summer Olympics
