= Synchronised swimming at the 1986 Commonwealth Games =

- Venue: Royal Commonwealth Pool
- Location: Edinburgh, Scotland
- Date: 24 July to 2 August 1986

Synchronised swimming at the 1986 Commonwealth Games was the debut appearances of synchronised swimming at the Commonwealth Games.

Competition featured two events and was held in Edinburgh, Scotland, from 24 July to 2 August 1986.

They events were held at the Royal Commonwealth Pool, which also hosted the events in 1970.

Canada topped the medal table winning both of the gold medals that were available.

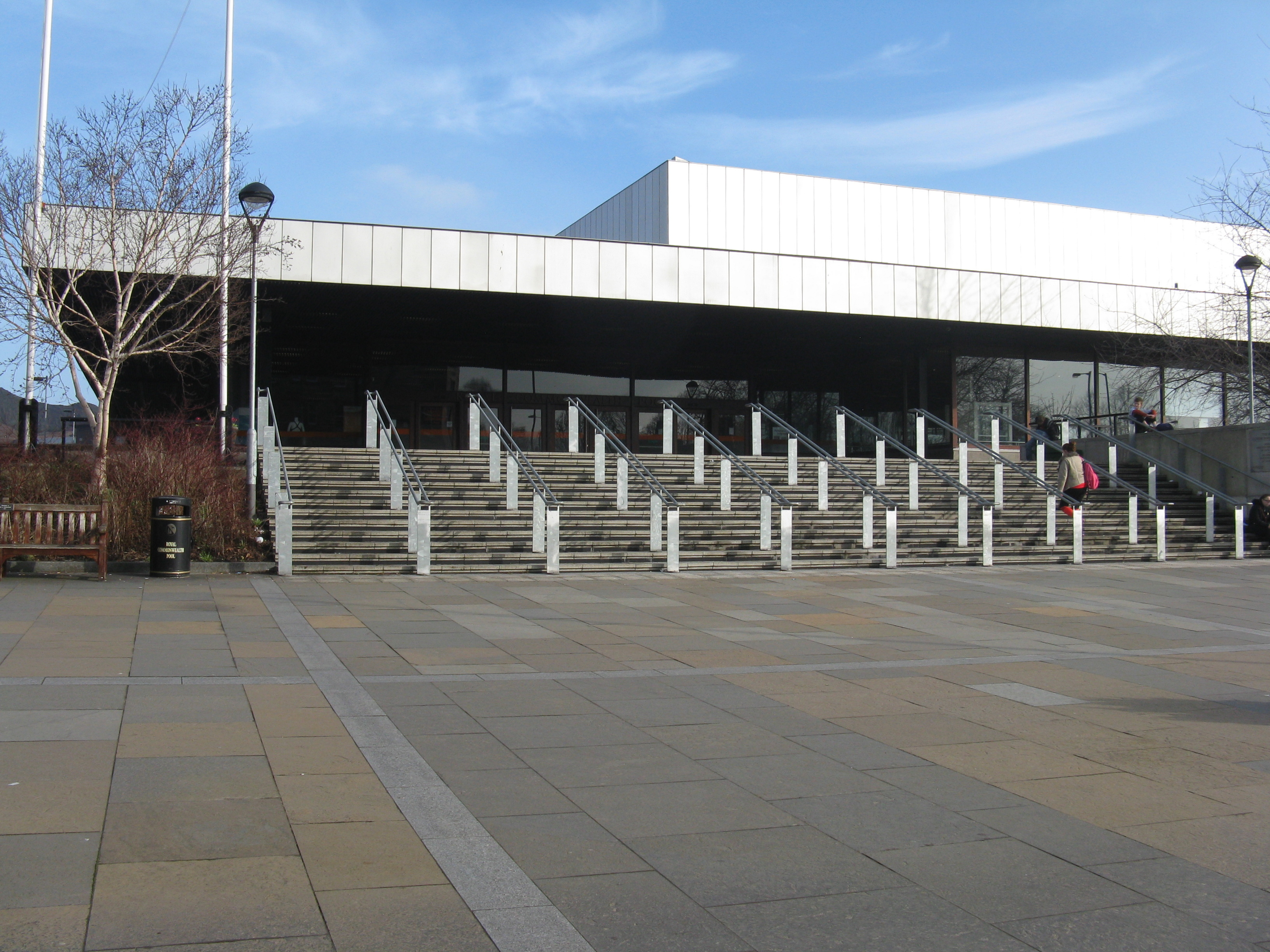
The Royal Commonwealth Pool

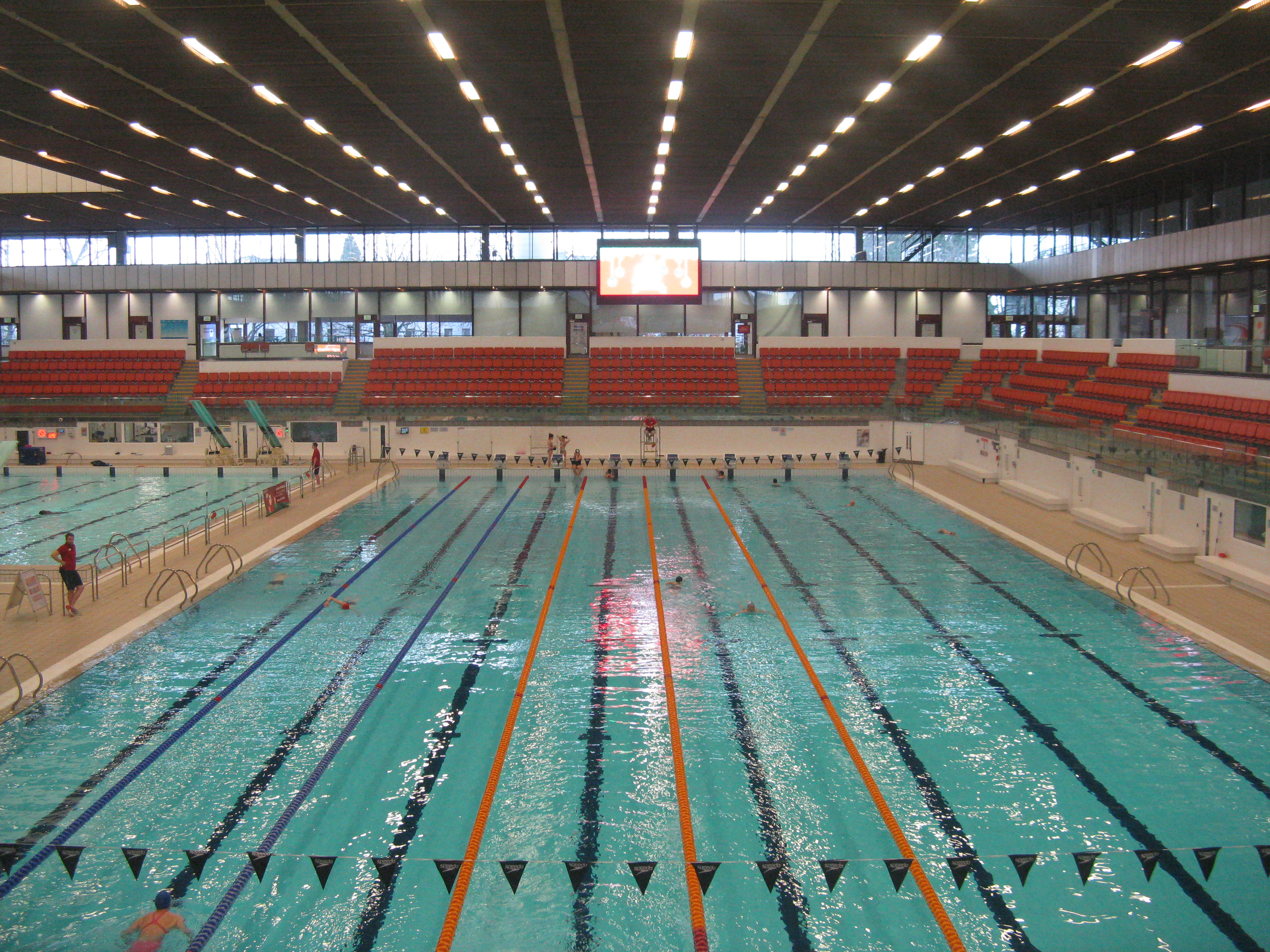
The pool in 2015

== Medal table ==
* Host nation (Scotland)

Rank	Nation	Gold	Silver	Bronze	Total
1	Canada	2	0	0	2
2	England	0	2	0	2
3	Australia	0	0	1	1
3	New Zealand	0	0	1	1
Totals (4 entries)		2	2	2	6

== Medallists ==
Event	Gold		Silver		Bronze	
Solo	Sylvie Fréchette; Canada	199.5	Amanda Dodd; England	188.05	Katie Sadleir; New Zealand	175.08
Duet	Michelle Cameron; Carolyn Waldo; Canada	199.54	Amanda Dodd; Nicola Shearn; England	186.59	Lisa Lieschke; Donna Rankin; Australia	173
