= Rex Hamilton =

New Zealand sport shooter (1928–2010)

Personal information
- Full name: Rex William Hamilton
- Born: 6 October 1928 Gisborne, New Zealand
- Died: 30 December 2010 (aged 82) Hamilton, New Zealand
- Occupation: Carpenter

Sport
- Country: New Zealand
- Sport: Shooting
Medal record
Shooting
Representing New Zealand
Commonwealth Games
Silver medal – second place	1982 Brisbane	Free pistol pairs
Bronze medal – third place	1986 Edinburgh	Centre-fire free pistol pairs

Rex William Hamilton (6 October 1928 – 30 December 2010) was a New Zealand sport shooter. He represented his country in the pistol shooting events at the 1982 and 1986 Commonwealth Games, winning two medals.

At the 1982 Commonwealth Games in Brisbane, Hamilton won the silver medal in the open 50 metres free pistol pairs, with Barrie Wickins, and the pair combined to finish fourth in the open 10 metres air pistol pairs. In the individual events, Hamilton placed fifth in the open 50 metres free pistol, 10th in the open 10 metres air pistol, and 16th in the open 25 metres centre-fire pistol.

Four years later, at the 1986 Commonwealth Games in Edinburgh, Hamilton teamed up with Barry O'Neale to win the bronze medal in the open 25 metres centre-fire pistol pairs, and Greg Yelavich in the open 50 metres free pistol pairs, finishing fifth. Hamilton placed fourth in both the open 25 metres centre-fire pistol and 50 metres free pistol individual events.

Hamilton was born on 6 October 1928, and worked as a carpenter. He died in Hamilton on 30 December 2010, and his ashes were buried in Taruheru Cemetery, Gisborne.
