= Bruce Holden =

New Zealand rower

Medal record

Men's rowing

Representing New Zealand

World Rowing Championships
Silver medal – second place	1986 Nottingham	M4+

Bruce Holden is a former New Zealand rower.

At the 1986 World Rowing Championships at Nottingham in the United Kingdom, he won a silver medal in the men's coxed four with Nigel Atherfold, Greg Johnston, Chris White, and Andrew Bird as cox.
