= Nigel Atherfold =

New Zealand rower

Personal information
- Born: Nigel William Atherfold; 13 June 1963 (age 63)
- Height: 189 cm (6 ft 2 in)
- Weight: 89 kg (196 lb)
Medal record
Men's rowing
Representing New Zealand
World Championships
Gold medal – first place	1983 Wedau	Eight
Silver medal – second place	1986 Nottingham	Coxed four

Nigel William Atherfold (born 13 June 1963) is a former New Zealand rower.

At the 1983 World Rowing Championships at Wedau in Duisburg, Germany, he won a gold medal with the New Zealand eight as the bowman. At the 1986 World Rowing Championships at Nottingham in the United Kingdom, he won a Silver in the men's coxed four with Bruce Holden, Greg Johnston, Chris White, and Andrew Bird as cox.
