= Athletics at the 1986 Commonwealth Games – Men's 400 metres hurdles =

Men's 400 metres hurdles at the Commonwealth Games

The men's 400 metres hurdles event at the 1986 Commonwealth Games was held on 27 and 28 July at the Meadowbank Stadium in Edinburgh.

== Medalists ==
Gold	Silver	Bronze
Phil Beattie; Northern Ireland	Max Robertson; England	John Graham; Canada

== Results ==
=== Heats ===
Qualification: First 3 of each heat (Q) and the next 2 fastest (q) qualified for the final.

Rank	Heat	Name	Nationality	Time	Notes
1	2	Phil Beattie	Northern Ireland	51.63	Q
2	2	Max Robertson	England	52.26	Q
3	2	Lloyd Guss	Canada	52.36	Q
4	1	John Graham	Canada	52.63	Q
5	1	Ken Gordon	Australia	52.66	Q
6	2	Pierre Leveille	Canada	52.75	q
7	1	Gary Oakes	England	53.02	Q
8	2	Mark Holtom	England	53.11	q
9	1	Wayne Paul	New Zealand	53.39	
10	2	Dave McCutcheon	Scotland	53.58	
11	1	Mark Hardie	Scotland	55.68	
12	1	Mark Fulton	Scotland	57.90	
	2	Joseph Rodan	Fiji	DNS	

=== Final ===
Rank	Lane	Name	Nationality	Time	Notes
1st place, gold medalist(s)	4	Phil Beattie	Northern Ireland	49.60	PB
2nd place, silver medalist(s)	3	Max Robertson	England	49.77	
3rd place, bronze medalist(s)	5	John Graham	Canada	50.25	
4	6	Lloyd Guss	Canada	50.56	
5	2	Mark Holtom	England	50.58	
6	1	Gary Oakes	England	50.82	
7	8	Pierre Leveille	Canada	51.54	
8	7	Ken Gordon	Australia	51.59	
