= Kyle McDuffie =

Canadian long jumper

Personal information
- Citizenship: Canadian

Sport
- Country: Canada
- Sport: Long jump

Achievements and titles
- National finals: 1985, 1987
- Commonwealth finals: 1986
Medal record
Representing Canada
Commonwealth Games
Bronze medal – third place	1986 Edinburgh	Long jump

Kyle McDuffie (born 28 August 1960) is a Canadian former long jumper who won a bronze medal at the 1986 Commonwealth Games in Edinburgh, Scotland. McDuffie won the Canadian national championships in 1985 and 1987. In 1987, he came second in a long jump event in Vancouver, British Columbia, Canada.
