= Greg Johnston (rower) =

New Zealand rower (born 1959)

Personal information
- Born: Peter Gregory Johnston; 16 May 1959 (age 67) Devonport, New Zealand
- Height: 195 cm (6 ft 5 in)
- Weight: 91 kg (201 lb)

Sport
- Sport: Rowing
- Club: Waikato Rowing Club
Medal record
Men's rowing
Representing New Zealand
Olympic Games
Bronze medal – third place	1988 Seoul	Coxed four
World Championships
Gold medal – first place	1983 Duisburg	Coxed four
Silver medal – second place	1979 Bled	Eight
Silver medal – second place	1986 Nottingham	Coxed four
Bronze medal – third place	Karapiro 1978	Eight
Commonwealth Games
Silver medal – second place	1986 Edinburgh	Coxed four

Peter Gregory Johnston (born 16 May 1959), known as Greg Johnston, is a former New Zealand rower who won an Olympic bronze medal at the 1988 Summer Olympics in Seoul. During his rowing career, Johnston has won 26 national championship titles in rowing, and was world champion in 1983 in the coxed four event.

== National rowing ==
Johnston was born in 1959 in Devonport, New Zealand. He received his secondary education at Melville High School in Hamilton, where he was dux. He was discovered as a rowing talent by Harry Mahon, who was a teacher at the school and later became national rowing coach. Johnston joined the Waikato Rowing Club and from 1978 onwards, he won a total of 26 national rowing titles: ten titles in the eight, nine titles in the four, two titles in coxless pair, and five titles in coxed pair.

== International rowing ==
His first international success came in the 1978 World Rowing Championships at Lake Karapiro, his home training ground, when he won bronze with the New Zealand eight. A year later, Johnston's New Zealand eight won silver at the 1979 World Rowing Championships in Bled, Yugoslavia. He was selected for the 1980 Summer Olympics in Moscow but did not compete due to New Zealand joining the Olympic boycott.

At the 1981 World Rowing Championships, the eight missed the A final and came seventh overall. At the 1983 World Rowing Championships in Duisburg, Germany, he was a member of the coxed four (alongside Conrad Robertson, Keith Trask, Les O'Connell, and Brett Hollister as cox) and won gold. At the 1984 Summer Olympics in Los Angeles, Johnston was again member of the New Zealand eight and they entered the competition as the favourite, with their strongest competitor, East Germany, absent due to the Eastern Bloc boycott, the Kiwis were the favourite to win the event. In the end, the eight finished a disappointing fourth and missed out on a medal.

At the 1986 World Rowing Championships at Nottingham in the United Kingdom, he won a silver in the men's coxed four with Nigel Atherfold, Bruce Holden, Chris White, and Andrew Bird as cox. At the 1986 Commonwealth Games he was in the coxed four which won the silver medal.

At the 1988 Summer Olympics, Johnston won bronze in the coxed four along with George Keys, Ian Wright, Chris White and Andrew Bird (cox).

== Later life ==
After retiring from rowing, Johnston lived on the West Coast and worked as an accountant. He also worked as a policeman and as a deer farmer in Geraldine. Together with his brother, he owns a deer farm near Kaikōura. He is now married with two children and three grandchildren. Johnston now lives in Kaipaki.
