= Athletics at the 1986 Commonwealth Games – Men's long jump =

Men's long jump at the Commonwealth Games

The men's long jump event at the 1986 Commonwealth Games was held on July, 31, at the Meadowbank Stadium in Edinburgh.

== Results ==
Rank	Name	Nationality	#1	#2	#3	#4	#5	#6	Result	Notes
1st place, gold medalist(s)	Gary Honey	Australia	7.79	8.08	7.88	7.94			8.08	
2nd place, silver medalist(s)	Fred Salle	England	7.48	7.68	7.52	x	7.73	7.83	7.83	
3rd place, bronze medalist(s)	Kyle McDuffie	Canada	7.22	7.58					7.79	
4	John King	England	7.44	7.17	7.58				7.70	
5	Derrick Brown	England	7.58						7.65	
6	Edrick Floréal	Canada	6.71	x	7.01				7.50	
7	Dave Culbert	Australia	7.00	x	7.13				7.41	
8	Ken McKay	Scotland	x	x	7.39				7.39	
9	Nelson Chan Ka-chiu	Hong Kong	6.53	x	6.83				6.83	
10	Simon Shirley	Australia	x						6.71	
11	William Akanoa	Cook Islands	x	x	6.01				6.01	
