= Langis Côté =

Canadian weightlifter (born 1965)

Personal information
- Born: 15 June 1965 (age 61) Jonquière, Quebec, Canada

Sport
- Sport: Weightlifting

Langis Côté (born 15 June 1965) is a Canadian weightlifter. He competed in the men's lightweight event at the 1988 Summer Olympics.
