= Dave Steen (decathlete) =

Canadian decathlete (born 1959)

Personal information
- Full name: David Lee Steen
- Born: 14 November 1959 (age 66) New Westminster, British Columbia, Canada
- Height: 185 cm (6 ft 1 in)
- Weight: 80 kg (176 lb)
Medal record
Men's athletics
Representing Canada
Olympic Games
Bronze medal – third place	1988 Seoul	Decathlon
Commonwealth Games
Silver medal – second place	1982 Brisbane	Decathlon
Silver medal – second place	1986 Edinburgh	Decathlon
Pan American Games
Gold medal – first place	1983 Caracas	Decathlon
Universiade
Gold medal – first place	1983 Edmonton	Decathlon

David Lee Steen, CM (born 14 November 1959) is a Canadian retired decathlete, a three-time member of the Canadian Summer Olympic Games team and the first Canadian to score more than 8,000 points in the decathlon.

He was named after his uncle, David Lorne Steen, a Canadian shot putter and gold medallist at the 1966 Commonwealth Games. His father, Don Steen, was Canadian decathlon champion in 1956.

Steen was a two-time All American for the California Golden Bears track and field team, placing in the decathlon top five at the 1979 and 1980 NCAA Division I Outdoor Track and Field Championships.

Earlier in his career, Steen excelled in the jump events, establishing personal bests of 7.37m, 2.03m, and 14.25m in the long, high, and triple jump while attending Burnaby Central Secondary.

Steen won the decathlon gold medal at the 1977 Canada Games. Steen was named to the 1980 Canadian Olympic team, but did not compete due to the American-led boycott of the 1980 Summer Olympics. He won a silver medal at the 1982 Commonwealth Games and gold at the 1983 Pan American Games. After a disappointing eighth-place finish at the 1984 Summer Olympics, Steen won silver at the 1986 Commonwealth Games and won the bronze medal at the 1988 Summer Olympics.

In 1990, Steen was made a Member of the Order of Canada. He has been inducted into the BC Sports Hall of Fame (1991) and Canada's Sports Hall of Fame (1992).

He now resides in Tecumseh, Ontario, with his wife Andrea Conlon, who was also a Canadian Olympic athlete. Together they have four children, Kory, Jordie, Jacey and Jack. He works as a firefighter.

== Sources ==
- "Dave Steen". cshof.ca. Canada's Sports Hall of Fame.
- "Dave Steen". olympic.ca. Canadian Olympic Committee. Archived from the original on 29 September 2007.
