= Tony Bull (wrestler) =

British wrestler

Personal information
- Nationality: British
Medal record
Wrestling
Representing England
Commonwealth Games
Bronze medal – third place	1986 Edinburgh	82kg middleweight

Tony Bull is a British retired wrestler.

== Wrestling career ==
Bull represented England and won a bronze medal in the 82 kg middleweight division, at the 1986 Commonwealth Games in Edinburgh, Scotland.
