= David Kilpin =

British wrestler

Personal information
- Nationality: British (English)
- Born: 4th quarter 1954 London, England

Sport
- Sport: Amateur wrestling
Medal record
Men's freestyle wrestling
Representing England
Commonwealth Games
Bronze medal – third place	1986 Edinburgh	100 kg

David Kilpin (born 1954) is a British retired wrestler who competed at the Commonwealth Games and won a bronze medal.

== Biography ==
Kilpin represented England and won a bronze medal in the 100 kg heavyweight division, at the 1986 Commonwealth Games in Edinburgh, Scotland.

Kilpin was the British champion after winning the 1987 heavyweight title at the British Wrestling Championships.

Kilpin was a policeman by profession and at the time of the 1986 Commonwealth Games lived in Forestdale, South Croydon.
