= Gary Holmes (wrestler) =

Canadian wrestler (born 1965)

Personal information
- Nationality: Canadian
- Born: 10 November 1965 (age 60) Georgetown, British Guiana

Sport
- Sport: Wrestling
Medal record
Representing Canada
Commonwealth Games
Gold medal – first place	1986 Edinburgh	-74kg freestyle
Pan American Games
Silver medal – second place	1999 Winnipeg	-85kg freestyle
Bronze medal – third place	1987 Indianapolis	-74kg freestyle

Gary Holmes (born 10 November 1965) is a Canadian wrestler. He competed at the 1988 Summer Olympics and the 1992 Summer Olympics. He is the brother of Lawrence Holmes.
