= Christine Clarke =

Canadian rower

Personal information
- Born: 11 August 1960 (age 65) Scarborough, Ontario, Canada

Sport
- Sport: Rowing

Christine Clarke (born 11 August 1960) is a Canadian rower. She competed in the women's eight event at the 1984 Summer Olympics.
