= Daniel Cumming =

Australian wrestler (born 1960)

Personal information
- Nationality: Australian
- Born: 8 December 1960 (age 65)

Sport
- Sport: Wrestling
Medal record
Wrestling
Representing Australia
Commonwealth Games
| Silver medal – second place | 1986 Edinburgh | Featherweight |

Daniel Henry Cumming (born 8 December 1960) is an Australian wrestler. He competed in the men's freestyle 62 kg at the 1988 Summer Olympics.
