= Sylvia Hume =

New Zealand swimmer (born 1968)

Personal information
- Born: 1 February 1968 (age 58) Auckland, New Zealand

Sport
- Sport: Swimming
Medal record
Women's swimming
Representing New Zealand
Commonwealth Games
| Gold medal – first place | 1986 Brisbane | 100 m backstroke |

Sylvia Margaret Hume (born 1 February 1968), also known by her married name Sylvia Sinclair, is a New Zealand swimmer.

Hume won gold in 100 m backstroke at the 1986 Commonwealth Games in Edinburgh, Scotland. She competed in two events at the 1988 Summer Olympics. She retired from the sport at age 22. She lives in Bath, England with her husband and their two sons.
