= Don Kwasnycia =

Canadian sports shooter (born 1952)

Personal information
- Born: 30 April 1952 (age 74) Toronto, Ontario, Canada

Sport
- Sport: Sports shooting
Medal record
Representing Canada
Commonwealth Games
Silver medal – second place	1986 Edinburgh	Skeet
Pan American Games
Silver medal – second place	1995 Mar del Plata	Skeet team
Bronze medal – third place	1987 Indianapolis	Skeet team

Don Kwasnycia (born 30 April 1952) is a Canadian sports shooter. He competed in the mixed skeet event at the 1988 Summer Olympics.
