= John Farrell (sport shooter) =

New Zealand sports shooter

Personal information
- Full name: John Campbell Farrell
- Nationality: New Zealand
- Born: 30 July 1954 (age 71) Dannevirke, New Zealand

Sport
- Sport: Sports shooting

John Campbell Farrell (born 30 July 1954) is a New Zealand former sports shooter. He competed in the mixed skeet event at the 1988 Summer Olympics.
