= Mark Howkins =

Canadian sports shooter (born 1953)

Personal information
- Nationality: Canadian
- Born: 17 June 1953 (age 71); Brisbane, Australia

Sport
- Sport: Sports shooting

Mark Howkins (born 17 June 1953 in Brisbane, Australia) is a Canadian sports shooter. He competed at the 1984 Summer Olympics and the 1988 Summer Olympics, and finished 13th and 29th respectively in the Rapid Fire Pistol 25m event.

== mj'kmExternal links ==
- Mark Howkins at Olympedia
