= David Connelly (wrestler) =

British wrestler

Personal information
- Born: 1967 or 1968 (age 58–59) Scotland

Sport
- Sport: Wrestling
- Club: Cumbernauld/Tryst AWC
Medal record
Men's freestyle wrestling
Representing Scotland
Commonwealth Games
Bronze medal – third place	1986 Edinburgh	Light-flyweight

David Connelly (born 1967 or 1968) is a former freestyle wrestler from Scotland who competed at two Commonwealth Games, winning a bronze medal.

== Biography ==
Connelly was a member of the Tryst Amateur Wrestling Club (formerly Cumbernauld).

Connelly represented the Scottish team at the 1986 Commonwealth Games in Edinburgh, Scotland, where he competed in the light-flyweight category, winning a bronze medal.

After missing the 1990 Commonwealth Games due to wrestling being replaced by judo, he returned to represent the Scottish team again at the 1994 Commonwealth Games in Victoria, Canada, where he competed in the slightly heavier 52kg flyweight category.

He was a MOT tester by profession.

His son Ross Connelly has won titles at the British Wrestling Championships and represented Scotland at the 2018 and 2022 Commonwealth Games.
