= Paul Sheard =

Australian-American economist (born 1954)

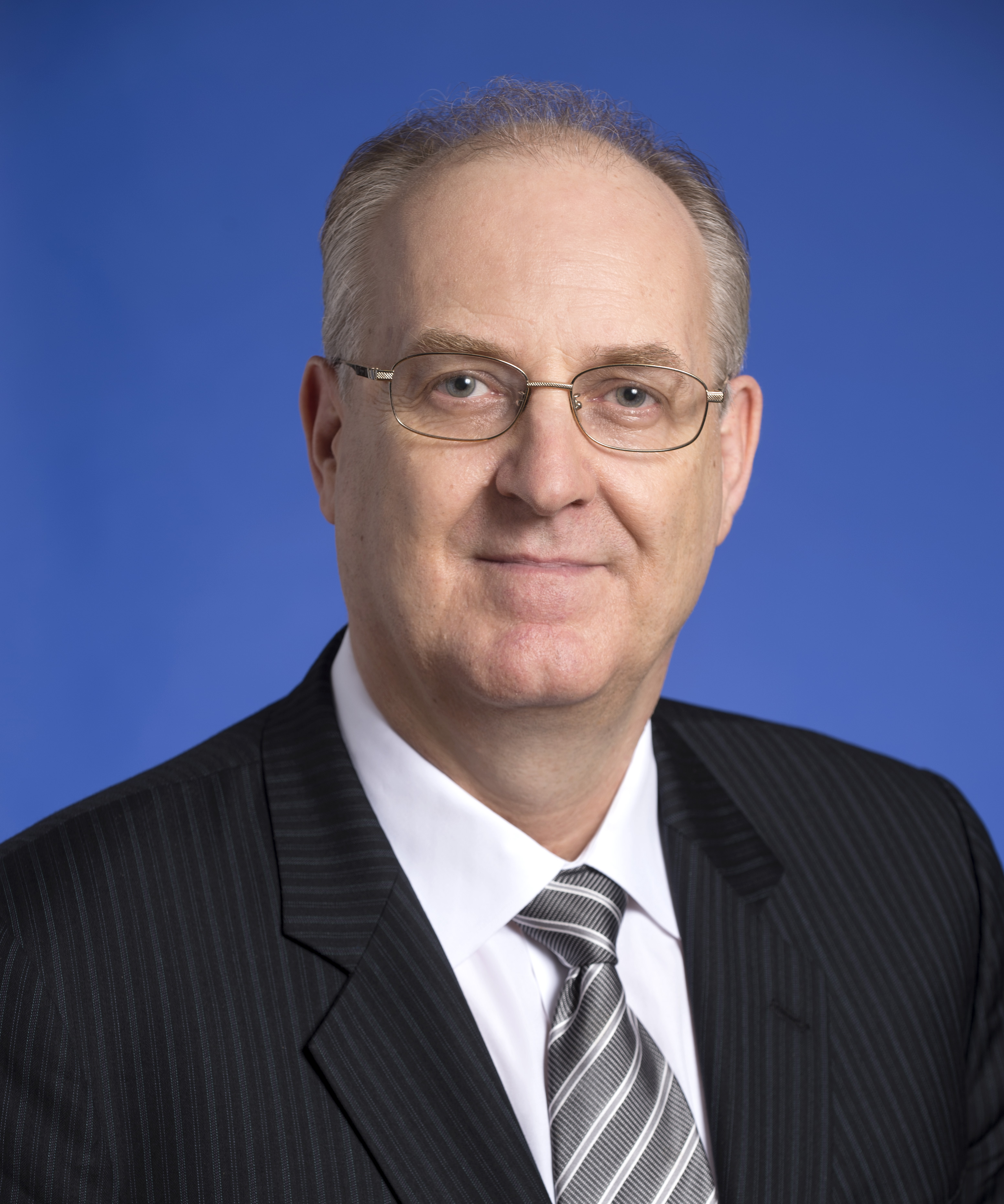
- Born: November 25, 1954 (age 71); Glenelg, South Australia, Australia
- Education: BA (Hons), Monash University; PhD, MEc, Australian National University
- Occupation: Economist
- Spouse: Yoshiko Sheard

Paul James Sheard (born November 25, 1954) is an Australian-American economist. Most recently he was Research Fellow and earlier M-RCBG Senior Fellow at Harvard Kennedy School's Mossavar-Rahmani Center for Business and Government, after previously being Vice Chairman of S&P Global. Sheard has held chief economist positions at Lehman Brothers, Nomura Securities, Standard & Poor's Ratings Services, and S&P Global. Prior to entering financial markets in 1995, he was an academic economist based in Australia, Japan and the United States, specializing in the Japanese economy and the economics of firm organization. He was a member of the World Economic Forum's Global Future Council on the New Agenda for Fiscal and Monetary Policy (2020-2022), having been a member of the WEF's Global Future Council on the New Economic Agenda (2018-2020) and of its Global Agenda Council on the International Monetary System (2010-2012). He is a member of the board of the Foreign Policy Association and is a member of the advisory board of the Levy Economics Institute of Bard College. He is a member of the Bretton Woods Committee, the Council on Foreign Relations, the Economic Club of New York and the National Committee on U.S.-China Relations. He attends and speaks regularly at conferences around the world, and his views on the global economy and economic policy are frequently cited in the international press.

== Career ==
Sheard was Kiyoshi Kojima Postdoctoral Fellow at the Australia-Japan Research Centre, ANU, Lecturer in Economics, and later Associate Professor of Economics at Osaka University. He held visiting scholar positions at Osaka University, the Bank of Japan, and Stanford University, where he was also visiting assistant professor of economics.

In January 1995, Sheard became Japan Strategist for Baring Asset Management and later Head of Japan Equity Investments. In September 2000, he was appointed Chief Economist for Asia of Lehman Brothers and became Global Chief Economist of Lehman in April 2006. When Lehman failed in September 2008, after a stint at Barclays Capital, in November 2008 Sheard was appointed Global Chief Economist and Head of Economic Research at Nomura Securities, based in New York. In June 2012, he moved to Standard & Poor's Ratings Services as Global Chief Economist and Head of Global Economics and Research and a member of the firm's executive committee, later becoming Chief Economist and Executive Vice President of S&P Global, the parent firm.

Sheard served as a member of committees of the Japanese Government's Economic Deliberation Council, in 1997-98 as an appointee of Prime Minister Ryutaro Hashimoto and in 1998-99 as an appointee of Prime Minister Keizo Obuchi. He served as a member of the oversight board of the Japanese Government's Research Institute of Economy, Trade and Industry, 2001–2006. From 2003 to 2010, Sheard served as a non-executive director of ORIX Corporation, a large Japanese financial services firm.

== Contributions ==
Sheard's academic work analyzed the economic rationale of distinct features of Japanese corporate organization, including the role of multi-tier subcontracting networks in the auto sector; the role of main banks and interlocking shareholdings in creating an internalized market for corporate control that supported the "lifetime" employment system; the informational and risk-sharing role of general trading companies (Sogo shosha) as financial intermediaries; and assessing the arguments that Japanese firms avoided short-termism. In the "structural impediments" debate of the early 1990s, Sheard argued that many of the features criticized as "non-tariff barriers" or as being anti-competitive were better understood in terms of how firms and markets in Japan were efficiently organized. He pointed out that the common practice of characterizing keiretsu or affiliated enterprise groups in Japan as "horizontal groups" was confusing because to many foreign observers "horizontal" connoted within-same-market whereas most of the relationships in question were "vertical" (between stages of production) or between-market in nature.

As a markets economist in Tokyo, Sheard was active in the policy debate, identifying two factors as contributing to Japan's falling into and remaining in deflation: the failure of the government to aggressively recapitalize the banks after it issued a blanket guarantee of deposits in June 1995 and the aggregate demand management policy mix, under macro deleveraging, of "timid" monetary policy and stop-start fiscal policy.

After the 2008 financial crisis and Great Recession, Sheard argued that sustained, aggressive monetary and fiscal policy expansion was needed to restore lost aggregate demand in the developed economies.

He has argued that quantitative easing (QE), far from being inflationary "money printing," is best viewed as a "debt management operation of the consolidated government" whereby the central bank retires government debt securities and refinances them into central bank money, and that, contrary to common parlance, banks cannot "lend out" their excess reserves. Sheard argues that, QE being a mild form of monetary easing, the unwinding of QE, in principle, is an innocuous process.

Invoking the metaphor of a "Monetary Garden of Eden", Sheard has argued that monetary and fiscal policies should be viewed as "two sides of the same sovereign coin" and much more closely coordinated and aligned, particularly when the threat to full employment and price stability is "from below," and that the macroeconomic policy framework needs to be reformed to enable that.

Sheard has argued that monetary union without fiscal union in the euro area is unsustainable, describing the architecture of the euro area at the time of the sovereign debt crisis as akin to putting countries, when hit by a sudden loss of aggregate demand, in a "macroeconomic vice," and that a steady-state solution must involve "either less monetary union or more fiscal union." Sheard identifies the fundamental problem with the economic and political architecture of the European Union as being the "selective sharing of sovereignty," viewing Brexit as being as much about the future of the EU as about the UK's relationship with the EU.

Long a critic of the Bank of Japan's monetary policy communication and action, Sheard has been a strong supporter of the Bank's April 2013 policy shift under Governor Haruhiko Kuroda, describing it as the monetary policy equivalent of a Copernican Revolution.

== Education ==
Sheard received a Bachelor of Arts (Honours in Japanese and Geography) from Monash University (1981) and a PhD in Japanese Economy (1986) and Master of Economics (1988) from the ANU.

== Awards and recognition ==
Sheard's 1981 undergraduate thesis was awarded the Institute of Australian Geographers’ Honours Thesis of the Year. His 1997 book in Japanese, Mein Banku Shihon Shugi no Kiki (The Crisis of Main Bank Capitalism), published by Toyo Keizai Shinposha, was awarded the 1998 Suntory Gakugei Prize in the Economics-Politics Section. In 2006, Sheard was recognized by Advance as one of 100 Leading Global Australians.

In May 2019, Monash University conferred an honorary Doctor of Laws on Sheard.

== Books ==
- The Power of Money: How Governments and Banks Create Money and Help Us All Prosper, Matt Holt Books, 2023, ISBN 9781637743157
- International Adjustment and the Japanese Firm (editor), Allen & Unwin, 1991, ISBN 1 86373 418X
- Japanese Firms, Finance, and Markets (editor), Addison Wesley Longman, 1996, ISBN 0582 81108 2
- Mein banku shihon shugi no kiki: biggu ban de kawaru Nihongata keiei (The Crisis of Main Bank Capitalism: How Japanese-style Management Will Change with "Big Bang") (in Japanese), Toyo Keizai Shinposha,1997, ISBN 4-492-39248-3
- Kigyo mega saihen: Shin Nihongata shihon shugi no maku ake (Corporate Mega Restructuring: The Curtain Opens on a New Japanese Capitalism) (in Japanese), Toyo Keizai Shinposha, 2000, ISBN 4-492-39335-8
