= Rob Chernoff =

Canadian swimmer

Personal information
- Born: 13 August 1965 (age 60) Regina, Saskatchewan, Canada

Sport
- Sport: Swimming

Rob Chernoff (born 13 August 1965) is a Canadian former swimmer. He competed in the men's 200 metre individual medley at the 1984 Summer Olympics.
