= Athletics at the 1986 Commonwealth Games – Men's 5000 metres =

Competition in the Commonwealth Games in 1986

Men's 5000 metres at the Commonwealth Games

The men's 5000 metres event at the 1986 Commonwealth Games was held on 31 July at the Meadowbank Stadium in Edinburgh.

== Results ==
Rank	Name	Nationality	Time	Notes
1st place, gold medalist(s)	Steve Ovett	England	13:24.11	
2nd place, silver medalist(s)	Jack Buckner	England	13:25.87	
3rd place, bronze medalist(s)	Tim Hutchings	England	13:26.84	
4	Paul Williams	Canada	13:28.51	
5	John Walker	New Zealand	13:35.34	
6	David Burridge	New Zealand	13:36.79	
7	Terry Greene	Northern Ireland	13:39.11	
8	Nat Muir	Scotland	13:40.92	
9	Paul McCloy	Canada	13:42.57	
10	Rob Lonergan	Canada	13:47.44	
11	Kerry Rodger	New Zealand	13:52.04	
12	Peter McColgan	Northern Ireland	13:58.75	
13	George Mambosasa	Malawi	14:18.33	
14	Thabiso Moqhali	Lesotho	14:48.91	
15	Jamie Marsh	Guernsey	15:26.22	
16	Paul Sheard	Guernsey	15:52.32	
	Richard Charleston	Scotland	DNS	
