= Athletics at the 1986 Commonwealth Games – Men's javelin throw =

The men's javelin throw event at the 1986 Commonwealth Games was held on 2 August at the Meadowbank Stadium in Edinburgh. This was the first edition using the new model javelin.

== Results ==
Rank	Name	Nationality	#1	#2	#3	#4	#5	#6	Result	Notes
1st place, gold medalist(s)	Dave Ottley	England	80.56	80.62					80.62	
2nd place, silver medalist(s)	Mick Hill	England	75.40	77.48	78.56	75.54	75.58		78.56	PB
3rd place, bronze medalist(s)	Gavin Lovegrove	New Zealand	72.40						76.22	
4	Daryl Brand	England	71.46	72.70					72.70	
5	Mike Mahovlich	Canada	71.42						71.42	
6	Pete Massfeller	Canada	70.30	x					70.86	
7	Colin Mackenzie	Wales	66.18						70.82	
8	Murray Keen	Australia	67.42						68.14	
9	John Stapylton-Smith	New Zealand	65.76						65.76	
10	Tim Newenham	Wales	57.70	64.44	65.48				65.48	
11	Michael Brennan	Canada	62.60	x	64.68				64.68	
12	Stewart Maxwell	Scotland	61.98						62.34	
