= Kevin Roy (weightlifter) =

Canadian weightlifter (born 1963)

Personal information
- Born: 21 April 1963 (age 63) Sudbury, Ontario, Canada

Sport
- Sport: Weightlifting

Kevin Roy (born 21 April 1963) is a Canadian weightlifter. He competed in the men's heavyweight I event at the 1984 Summer Olympics.
