= Denis Garon =

Canadian weightlifter (born 1963)

Personal information
- Born: 10 March 1963 (age 63) Quebec City, Quebec, Canada

Sport
- Sport: Weightlifting

Denis Garon (born 10 March 1963) is a Canadian weightlifter. He competed at the 1984 Summer Olympics, the 1988 Summer Olympics and the 1992 Summer Olympics.
