= John Graham (hurdler) =

Canadian hurdler (born 1965)

Personal information
- Born: November 20, 1965 (age 60) Moose Jaw, Saskatchewan, Canada

Sport
- Sport: Track and field Bobsleigh
Medal record
Representing Canada
Commonwealth Games
Bronze medal – third place	1986 Edinburgh	400m hurdles
Bronze medal – third place	1986 Edinburgh	4x400m relay
Bronze medal – third place	1990 Auckland	400m hurdles

John Graham (born November 20, 1965) is a Canadian retired track and field athlete, who competed in the 400 metres and 400 metre hurdles. John was University of Calgary's Athlete of the Year in 1985 winning the 300m and 600m, 4 × 200 m and 4 × 400 m races at Canada West and the National Collegiate Championships. In 1989, he won those same events again claiming the Canadian athlete of the meet for the second time. He represented his Canada on the national team from 1985 to 1991 and the 1988 Summer Olympics in Seoul, South Korea. John won three bronze medals in the Commonwealth Games in 1986 and 1990. Along the way, he captured 11 National Championships and set numerous national records both indoor and outdoors.

John was also a member of the Canadian bobsleigh team. Graham was the Brakeman for Canada 1 which won the 1990 World Cup 4-man bobsleigh Championship. Canada 1 set several push records and won 3 national titles over Graham's 4 years with Chris Lori as driver.
