= Wrestling at the 1986 Commonwealth Games =

- Venue: Edinburgh Playhouse
- Location: Edinburgh, Scotland
- Dates: 24 July to 2 August 1986

Wrestling at the 1986 Commonwealth Games was the 13th appearance of Wrestling at the Commonwealth Games. The events were held in Edinburgh, Scotland, from 24 July to 2 August 1986. The competition featured contests in ten weight classes.

The events took place in the Edinburgh Playhouse on Greenside Place.

Canada topped the wrestling medal table by virtue of winning nine of the ten gold medals on offer. The domination of the Canadian team was primarily due to there being no wrestlers from India and Pakistan due to the boycott.

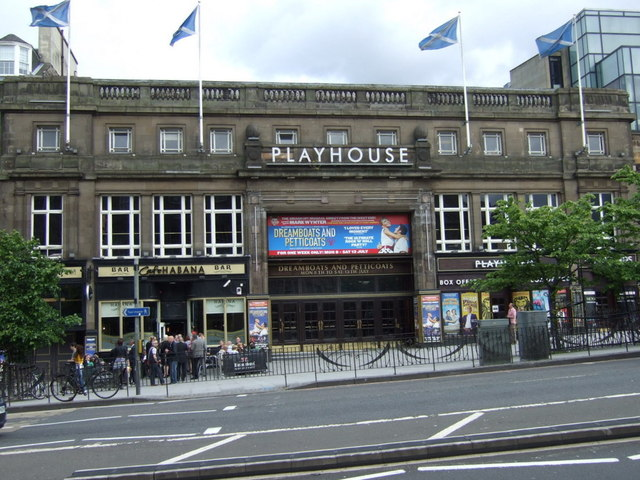
The Playhouse in 2013

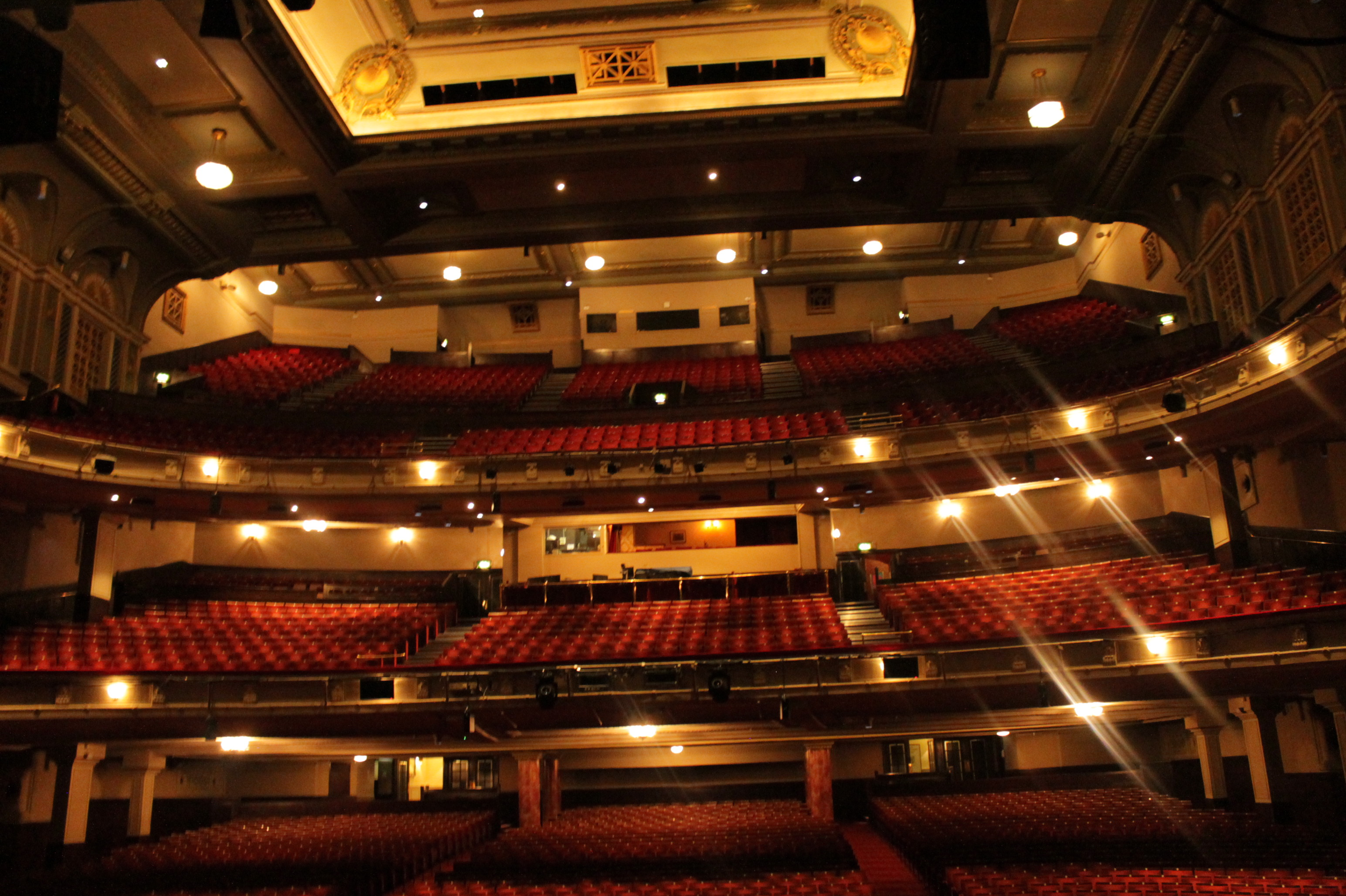
The interior in 2023

== Medal table ==
* Host nation (Scotland)

Medals won by nation with totals, ranked by number of golds—sortable
| Rank | Nation | Gold | Silver | Bronze | Total |
|---|---|---|---|---|---|
| 1 | Canada | 9 | 1 | 0 | 10 |
| 2 | England | 1 | 1 | 7 | 9 |
| 3 | Australia | 0 | 5 | 0 | 5 |
| 4 | New Zealand | 0 | 2 | 1 | 3 |
| 5 | Scotland* | 0 | 1 | 2 | 3 |
| Totals (5 entries) | | 10 | 10 | 10 | 30 |

== Medallists ==
| Event | Gold | Silver | Bronze |
|---|---|---|---|
| Light flyweight 48kg | Ron Moncur (CAN) | Duncan Burns (ENG) | David Connelly (SCO) |
| Flyweight 52kg | Chris Woodcroft (CAN) | James McAlary (AUS) | Nigel Donohue (ENG) |
| Bantamweight 57kg | Mitch Ostberg (CAN) | Steve Reinsfield (NZL) | Brian Aspen (ENG) |
| Featherweight 62kg | Paul Hughes (CAN) | Dan Cumming (AUS) | Stephen Bell (NZL) |
| Lightweight 68kg | Dave McKay (CAN) | Zsigmund Kelevitz (AUS) | Steve Cooper (ENG) |
| Welterweight 74kg | Gary Holmes (CAN) | Geoffrey Marsh (AUS) | Fitz Walker (ENG) |
| Middleweight 82kg | Chris Rinke (CAN) | Wally Koenig (AUS) | Tony Bull (ENG) |
| Light heavyweight 90kg | Noel Loban (ENG) | Doug Cox (CAN) | Graeme English (SCO) |
| Heavyweight 100kg | Clark Davis (CAN) | Robert Algie (NZL) | David Kilpin (ENG) |
| Super heavyweight +100kg | Wayne Brightwell (CAN) | Albert Patrick (SCO) | Keith Peache (ENG) |

== Results ==
=== Light flyweight 48kg ===
- Three competitors only

| Round | Winner | Loser |
|---|---|---|
| round-robin | Ron Moncur (CAN) | Duncan Burns (ENG) |
| round-robin | Duncan Burns (ENG) | David Connelly (SCO) |
| round-robin | Ron Moncur (CAN) | David Connelly (SCO) |

Final positions: 1. Moncur 2. Burns 3. Connelly

=== Flyweight 52kg ===
| Round | Winner | Loser |
|---|---|---|
| Group A | James McAlary (AUS) | Shane Stannett (NZL) |
| Group A | Shane Stannett (NZL) | Jesmond Giordemaina (MLT) |
| Group A | James McAlary (AUS) | Jesmond Giordemaina (MLT) |
| Group B | Chris Woodcroft (CAN) | Nigel Donohue (ENG) |
| Bronze medal | Nigel Donohue (ENG) | Shane Stannett (NZL) |
| Gold medal | Chris Woodcroft (CAN) | James McAlary (AUS) |

Final positions: 1. Woodcroft 2. McAlary 3. Donohue 4. Stannett 5. Giordemaina

=== Bantamweight 57kg ===
| Round | Winner | Loser |
|---|---|---|
| Group A | Brian Aspen (ENG) | Paul Kirkby (AUS) |
| Group A | Mitch Ostberg (CAN) | Paul Kirkby (AUS) |
| Group A | Mitch Ostberg (CAN) | Brian Aspen (ENG) |
| Group B | Steve Reinsfield (NZL) | Paul Farrugia (MLT) |
| Group B | Steve Reinsfield (NZL) | Paul Nedley (SCO) |
| Group B | Paul Nedley (SCO) | Paul Farrugia (MLT) |
| 5th/6th | Paul Kirkby (AUS) | Paul Farrugia (MLT) |
| Bronze medal | Brian Aspen (ENG) | Paul Nedley (SCO) |
| Gold medal | Mitch Ostberg (CAN) | Steve Reinsfield (NZL) |

Final positions: 1. Ostberg 2. Reinsfield 3. Aspen 4. Nedley 5. Kirby 6. Farrugia

=== Featherweight 62kg ===
| Round | Winner | Loser |
|---|---|---|
| Group A | Paul Hughes (CAN) | Mark Bowman (NIR) |
| Group A | Stephen Bell (NZL) | Mark Bowman (NIR) |
| Group A | Paul Hughes (CAN) | Stephen Bell (NZL) |
| Group B | Gavin Beswick (ENG) | Brian Miller (SCO) |
| Group B | Dan Cumming (AUS) | Gavin Beswick (ENG) |
| Group B | Dan Cumming (AUS) | Brian Miller (SCO) |
| 5th/6th | Brian Miller (SCO) | Mark Bowman (NIR) |
| Bronze medal | Stephen Bell (NZL) | Gavin Beswick (ENG) |
| Gold medal | Paul Hughes (CAN) | Dan Cumming (AUS) |

Final positions: 1. Hughes 2. Cumming 3. Bell 4. Beswick 5. Miller 6. Bowman

=== Lightweight 68kg ===
| Round | Winner | Loser |
|---|---|---|
| Group A | Zsigmond Kelevitz (AUS) | Chris McKay (SCO) |
| Group A | Dave McKay (CAN) | Steve Cooper (ENG) |
| Bronze medal | Steve Cooper (ENG) | Chris McKay (SCO) |
| Gold medal | Dave McKay (CAN) | Zsigmond Kelevitz (AUS) |

Final positions: 1. D. McKay 2. Kelevitz 3. Cooper 4. C.McKay

=== Welterweight 74kg ===
| Round | Winner | Loser |
|---|---|---|
| Group A | Geoffrey Marsh (AUS) | Calum McNeill (SCO) |
| Group A | Geoffrey Marsh (AUS) | Zane Coleman (NZL) |
| Group A | Calum McNeill (SCO) | Zane Coleman (NZL) |
| Group B | Gary Holmes (CAN) | Fitz Walker (ENG) |
| Bronze medal | Fitz Walker (ENG) | Calum McNeill (SCO) |
| Gold medal | Gary Holmes (CAN) | Geoffrey Marsh (AUS) |

Final positions: 1. Holmes 2. Marsh 3. Walker 4. McNeil 5. Coleman

=== Middleweight 82kg ===
| Round | Winner | Loser |
|---|---|---|
| Group A | Chris Rinke (CAN) | Eddie Cusak (NIR) |
| Group A | Chris Rinke (CAN) | Tony Bull (ENG) |
| Group A | Tony Bull (ENG) | Eddie Cusak (NIR) |
| Group B | Wally Koenig (AUS) | Paul Beattie (SCO) |
| Bronze medal | Tony Bull (ENG) | Paul Beattie (SCO) |
| Gold medal | Chris Rinke (CAN) | Wally Koenig (AUS) |

Final positions: 1. Rinke 2. Koenig 3. Bull 4. Beattie 5. Cusak

=== Light heavyweight 90kg ===
| Round | Winner | Loser |
|---|---|---|
| Group A | Noel Loban (ENG) | Alan Thompson (AUS) |
| Group B | Doug Cox (CAN) | Graeme English (SCO) |
| Bronze medal | Graeme English (SCO) | Alan Thompson (AUS) |
| Gold medal | Noel Loban (ENG) | Doug Cox (CAN) |

Final positions: 1. Loban 2. Cox 3. English 4. Thompson

=== Heavyweight 100kg ===
| Round | Winner | Loser |
|---|---|---|
| Group A | Clark Davis (CAN) | Ivan Weir (NIR) |
| Group A | Gabriel Toth (AUS) | Ivan Weir (NIR) |
| Group A | Clark Davis (CAN) | Gabriel Toth (AUS) |
| Group A | Ivan Weir (NIR) | Villame Takayawa (FIJ) |
| Group A | Gabriel Toth (AUS) | Villame Takayawa (FIJ) |
| Group B | David Kilpin (ENG) | Willie Robertson (SCO) |
| Group B | Robert Algie (NZL) | Willie Robertson (SCO) |
| Group B | Robert Algie (NZL) | David Kilpin (ENG) |
| 5th/6th | Willie Robertson (SCO) | Ivan Weir (NIR) |
| Bronze medal | David Kilpin (ENG) | Gabriel Toth (AUS) |
| Gold medal | Clark Davis (CAN) | Robert Algie (NZL) |

Final positions: 1. Davis 2. Algie 3. Kilpin 4. Toth 5. Robertson 6. Weir 7. Takayawa

=== Super heavyweight +100kg ===
| Round | Winner | Loser |
|---|---|---|
| Group A | Albert Patrick (SCO) | Dru Schaffer (AUS) |
| Group B | Wayne Brightwell (CAN) | Keith Peache (ENG) |
| Bronze medal | Keith Peache (ENG) | Dru Schaffer (AUS) |
| Gold medal | Wayne Brightwell (CAN) | Albert Patrick (SCO) |

Final positions: 1. Brightwell 2. Patrick 3. Peache 4. Schaffer

== See also ==
- List of Commonwealth Games medallists in wrestling
