= Athletics at the 1986 Commonwealth Games – Women's 10,000 metres =

Women's 10,000 metres at the Commonwealth Games

The women's 10,000 metres event at the 1986 Commonwealth Games was held at the Meadowbank Stadium in Edinburgh on 28 July 1986. It was the first time that this event was contested at the Commonwealth Games.

The winning margin was 11.89 seconds which as of 2024 remains the only time the women's 10,000 metres was won by more than ten seconds at these games.

== Results ==
Rank	Name	Nationality	Time	Notes
1st place, gold medalist(s)	Liz Lynch	Scotland	31:41.42	GR
2nd place, silver medalist(s)	Anne Audain	New Zealand	31:53.31	
3rd place, bronze medalist(s)	Angela Tooby	Wales	32:25.38	
4	Nancy Rooks	Canada	32:30.71	
5	Susan Lee	Canada	32:30.75	
6	Susan Tooby	Wales	32:56.78	
7	Marina Samy	England	33:10.94	
8	Carole Rouillard	Canada	33:22.31	
9	Andrea Everett	Scotland	33:56.43	
10	Christine Price	Scotland	33:59.90	
11	Debbie Peel	England	36:03.79	
	Chris McMiken	New Zealand	DNF	
	Jill Clarke	England	DNF	
	Debbie Elsmore	New Zealand	DNF	
	Lisa Martin	Australia	DNS	
