= Athletics at the 1986 Commonwealth Games – Women's marathon =

Women's marathon at the Commonwealth Games

The women's marathon event at the 1986 Commonwealth Games was held in Edinburgh, Scotland on 1 August 1986. It was the first time that women contested the marathon at the Commonwealth Games.

== Results ==
Rank	Name	Nationality	Time	Notes
1st place, gold medalist(s)	Lisa Martin	Australia	2:26:07	
2nd place, silver medalist(s)	Lorraine Moller	New Zealand	2:28:17	
3rd place, bronze medalist(s)	Odette Lapierre	Canada	2:31:48	
4	Lizanne Bussieres	Canada	2:35:18	
5	Lorna Irving	Scotland	2:36:34	
6	Angela Pain	England	2:37.57	
7	Glynis Penny	England	2:38:47	
8	Moira O'Neill	Northern Ireland	2:42:29	
9	Mary O'Connor	New Zealand	2:46:48	
10	Vanessa Tilbury	Botswana	2:47:24	
11	Maureen Oddie	Isle of Man	2:59:05	
-	Julia Gates	England	DNF	
