= Athletics at the 1986 Commonwealth Games – Men's decathlon =

Men's decathlon at the Commonwealth Games

The men's decathlon event at the 1986 Commonwealth Games was held on 27 and 28 July at the Meadowbank Stadium in Edinburgh.

== Results ==
The highest mark recorded in each event is highlighted in yellow. Daley Thompson came first in an unprecedented eight events which as of August 2024 has not been seen before or since. The corresponding record for the Olympic Games is four (achieved most recently by Bryan Clay in 2008) and for the World Athletics Championships it is five, achieved by former world record holder Dan O'Brien (USA) in Tokyo in 1991.

Rank	Athlete	Nationality	100m	LJ	SP	HJ	400m	110m H	DT	PV	JT	1500m	Points	Notes
1st place, gold medalist(s)	Daley Thompson	England	10.37	7.70	15.01	2.08	47.30	14.22	43.72	5.10	60.82	4:39.63	8663	GR
2nd place, silver medalist(s)	Dave Steen	Canada	11.14	7.40	13.22	2.02	48.45	14.91	43.62	5.00	60.18	4:22.65	8173	
3rd place, bronze medalist(s)	Simon Poelman	New Zealand	10.80	7.02	14.32	2.05	51.07	14.51	44.40	4.80	56.68	4:32.87	8015	
4	Brad McStravick	Scotland	10.83	6.73	13.47	1.93	49.52	15.15	40.52	4.40	56.06	4:33.05	7563	
5	Stuart Andrews	Australia	10.96	6.87	12.92	1.93	49.09	15.71	43.64	4.40	54.26	4:35.01	7512	
6	Gordon Orlikow	Canada	11.14	7.14	12.42	1.90	49.91	14.70	37.34	4.40	51.14	4:29.35	7424	
7	Mike Smith	Canada	11.14	7.01	12.64	1.99	48.74	15.48	37.34	3.80	60.72	4:38.48	7363	
8	Simon Shirley	Australia	11.22	7.28	11.84	1.99	49.11	15.70	34.58	3.80	55.22	4:21.66	7290	
9	Greg Richards	England	11.43	6.85	12.92	1.87	50.23	15.00	42.72	4.60	50.02	4:48.04	7278	
10	Albert Miller	Fiji	11.28	6.49	12.49	1.96	50.72	14.93	40.70	4.10	55.44	4:48.44	7158	
11	Alf Oddie	Isle of Man	11.81	6.37	10.67	1.78	54.11	17.61	33.54	3.60	52.64	4:37.58	6058	
	Eugene Gilkes	England	10.65	7.06	14.62	1.99	DQ	15.20	44.54	4.40	DNS	–	DNF	
	Peter Fossey	Australia	11.08	6.95	12.16	1.96	50.98	16.71	38.08	NM	DNS	–	DNF	
