= Andrew Bird (rowing) =

New Zealand rowing cox (born 1967)

Personal information
- Born: Andrew David Bird; 17 March 1967 (age 59) Greymouth, New Zealand

Sport
- Sport: Rowing
Medal record
Men's rowing
Representing New Zealand
Olympic Games
Bronze medal – third place	1988 Seoul	Coxed four
World Championships
Silver medal – second place	1986 Nottingham	Coxed four

Andrew David Bird (born 17 March 1967) is a former New Zealand rowing cox who won an Olympic bronze medal at the 1988 Summer Olympics in Seoul.

Bird was born in Greymouth, New Zealand, in 1967. He won bronze in the coxed four along with George Keys, Greg Johnston, Ian Wright and Chris White. In 1986 Bird won silver medals in the coxed four at both the Commonwealth Games in Edinburgh and the World Rowing Championships in Nottingham. In 1987 he coxed the men's eight at the World Championships in Denmark.

He lives in Wellington where he is the principal of Kelburn Normal primary school. His daughter, Lucy Bird, won gold as a coxswain for the women's premier eight at the 2016 New Zealand rowing nationals.
