= Lawn bowls at the 2014 Commonwealth Games =

- Venue: Kelvingrove Lawn Bowls Centre
- Dates: 24 July – 1 August 2014

Lawn bowls at the 2014 Commonwealth Games was the 19th appearance of lawn bowls at the Commonwealth Games. The lawn bowls competition was held at the Kelvingrove Lawn Bowls Centre in Glasgow, Scotland from 24 July to 1 August 2014.

Lawn bowls is one of ten core sports at the Commonwealth Games and has been continuously held at every Games since the 1930 British Empire Games, with the exception of the 1966 British Empire and Commonwealth Games in Kingston, Jamaica. The men's and women's fours events returned to the program for the first time since the 2002 Commonwealth Games and two new para-sports events made their debut at these Games.

== Schedule ==
All times are British Summer Time (UTC+1)

P	Preliminaries	¼	Quarterfinals	½	Semifinals	F	Final

Date →	Thu 24		Fri 25		Sat 26		Sun 27			Mon 28		Tue 29		Wed 30		Thu 31			Fri 1	
Event ↓	M	A	M	A	M	A	M		A	M	A	M	A	M	A	M		A	M	A
Men's singles									P		P					¼	½			F
Men's pairs	P					¼	½			F										
Men's triples	P					¼	½			F										
Men's fours							P				P				P	¼		½	F	
Women's singles	P					¼	½		F											
Women's pairs										P		P				¼	½		F	
Women's triples										P					¼	½		F		
Women's fours	P					¼	½	F												
Mixed para-sport pairs	P			½	F															
Open para-sport triples										P		P			½	F				

M = Morning session, A = Afternoon session

== Events ==
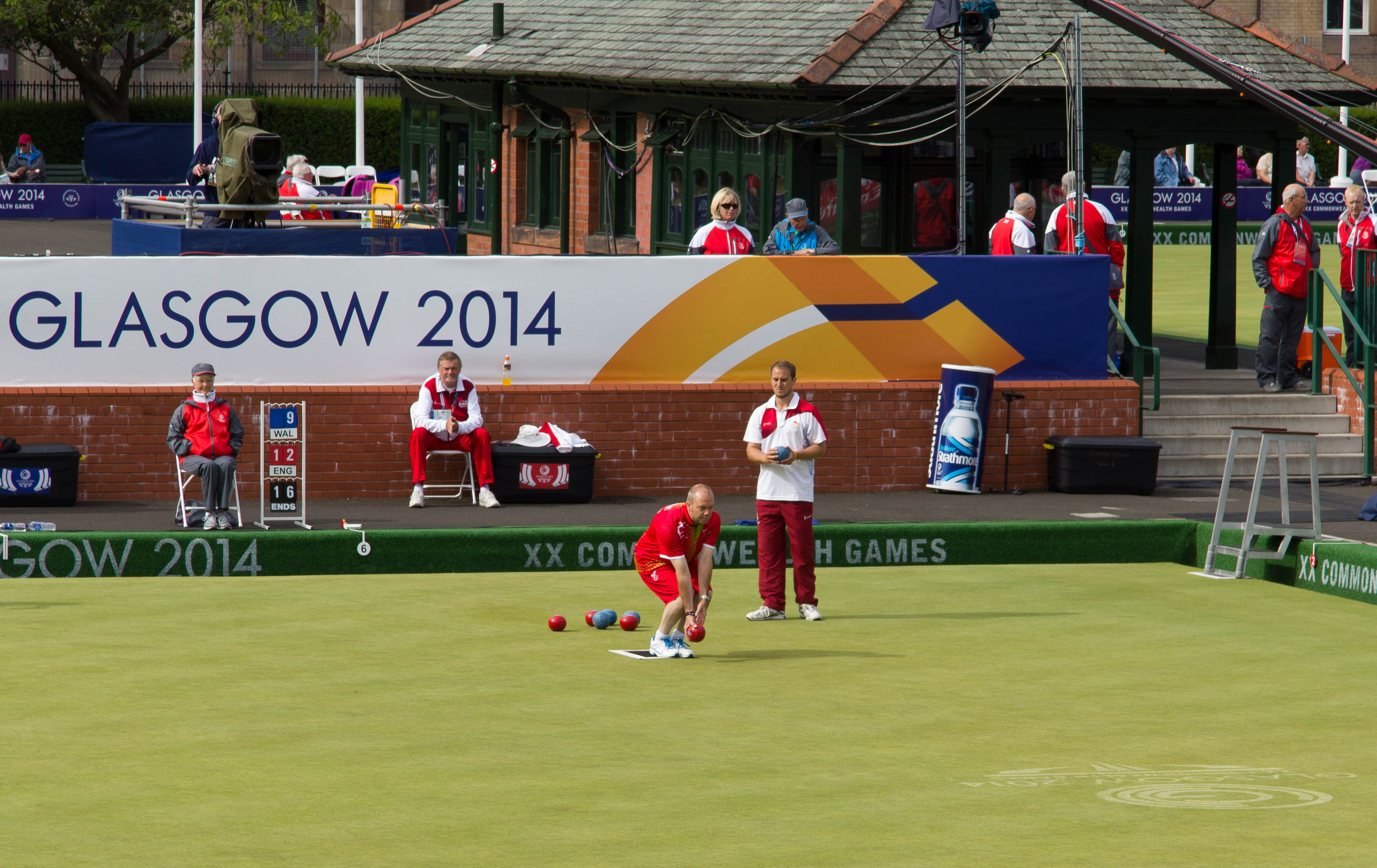
Lawn bowls action at the games.

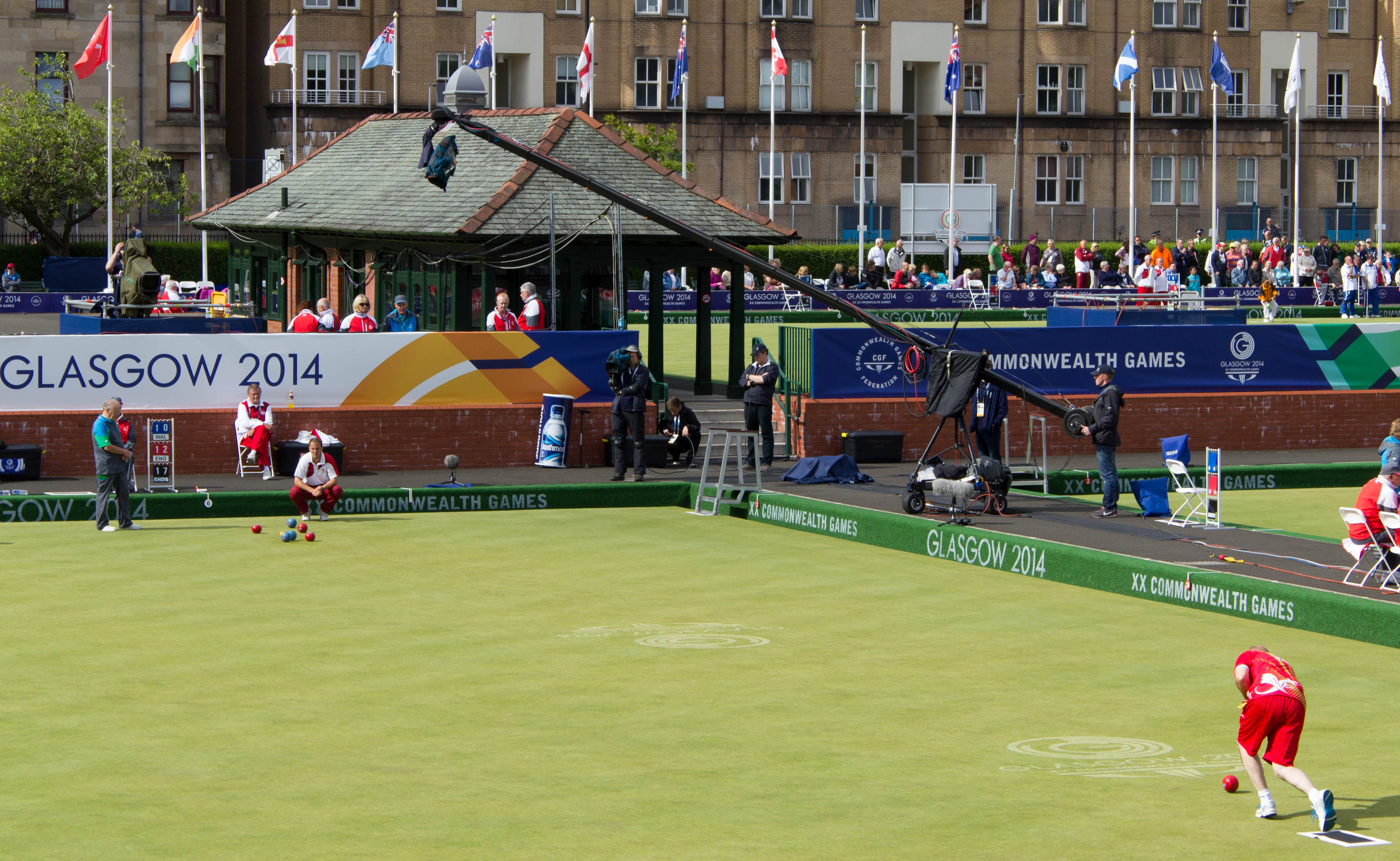
Lawn bowls action at the games.

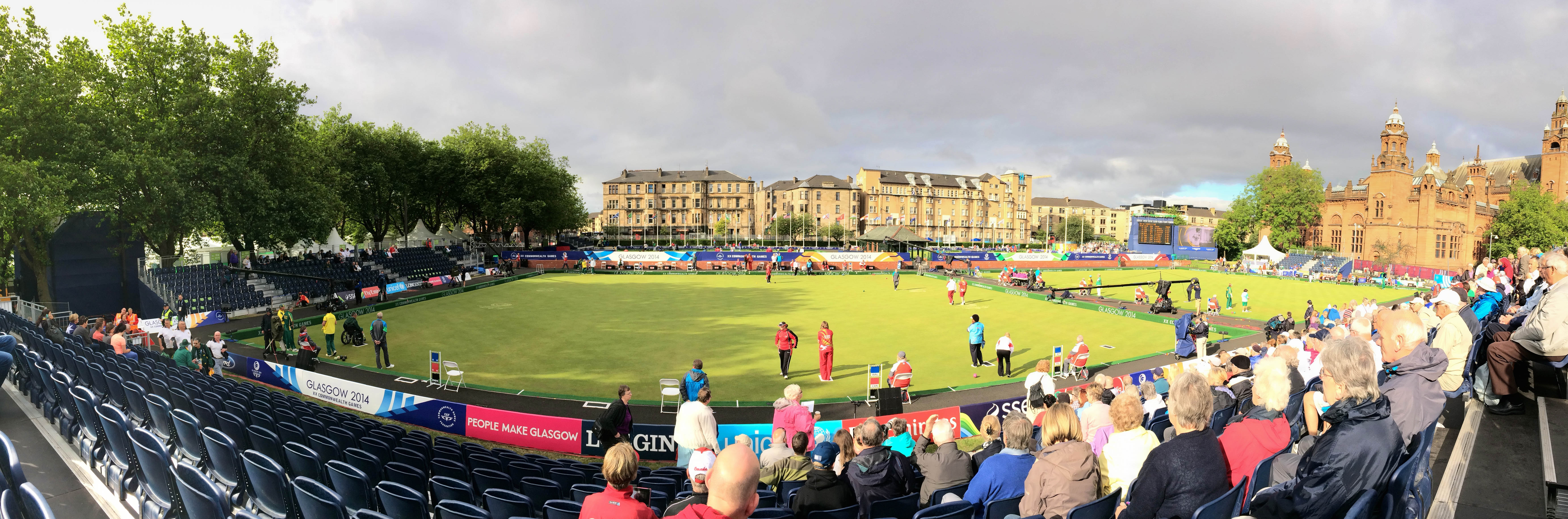
Lawn bowls action at the games.

=== Men ===
Event	Gold	Silver	Bronze
Singles	Darren Burnett; Scotland	Ryan Bester; Canada	Aron Sherriff; Australia
Pairs	Scotland; Paul Foster; Alex Marshall	Malaysia; Muhammad Hizlee Abdul Rais; Fairul Izwan Abd Muin	England; Andrew Knapper; Sam Tolchard
Triples	South Africa; Prince Neluonde; Petrus Breitenbach; Bobby Donnelly	Northern Ireland; Paul Daly; Neil Mulholland; Neil Booth	Wales; Paul Taylor; Jonathan Tomlinson; Marc Wyatt
Fours	Scotland; David Peacock; Neil Speirs; Paul Foster; Alex Marshall	England; John McGuinness; Andrew Knapper; Stuart Airey; Jamie Chestney	Australia; Wayne Ruediger; Brett Wilkie; Nathan Rice; Matt Flapper

=== Women ===
Event	Gold	Silver	Bronze
Singles	Jo Edwards; New Zealand	Natalie Melmore; England	Colleen Piketh; South Africa
Pairs	South Africa; Tracy-Lee Botha; Colleen Piketh	England; Jamie-Lea Winch; Natalie Melmore	Northern Ireland; Mandy Cunningham; Barbara Cameron
Triples	England; Sophie Tolchard; Ellen Falkner; Sian Gordon	Australia; Lynsey Clarke; Karen Murphy; Kelsey Cottrell	South Africa; Esme Steyn; Santjie Steyn; Susan Nel
Fours	South Africa; Esme Steyn; Santjie Steyn; Tracy-Lee Botha; Susan Nel	Malaysia; Emma Firyana Saroji; Nur Fidrah Noh; Nor Hashimah Ismail; Azlina Arshad	New Zealand; Selina Goddard; Amy McIlroy; Val Smith; Mandy Boyd

=== Para-sport ===
Event	Gold	Silver	Bronze
Mixed para-sport pairs	South Africa; Gwen Nel; Annatjie van Rooyen; Geoff Newcombe; Herman Scholtz	Scotland; David Thomas; Ron McArthur; Robert Conway; Irene Edgar	Australia; Tony Scott; Bruce Jones; Joy Forster; Peter Scott
Open para-sport triples	South Africa; Deon Van De Vyver; Roger Hagerty; Lobban Derrick	New Zealand; Lynda Bennett; Barry Wynks; Mark Noble	England; Bob Love; David Fisher; Paul Brown

== Medal table ==
* Host nation (Scotland)

Rank	Nation	Gold	Silver	Bronze	Total
1	South Africa	5	0	2	7
2	Scotland*	3	1	0	4
3	England	1	3	2	6
4	New Zealand	1	1	1	3
5	Malaysia	0	2	0	2
6	Australia	0	1	3	4
7	Northern Ireland	0	1	1	2
8	Canada	0	1	0	1
9	Wales	0	0	1	1
Totals (9 entries)		10	10	10	30

== See also ==
- List of Commonwealth Games medallists in lawn bowls
- Lawn bowls at the Commonwealth Games
