= Lawn bowls at the 2014 Commonwealth Games – Men's triples =

Lawn bowls – Men's triples at the 2014 Commonwealth Games
- Venue: Kelvingrove Lawn Bowls Centre
- Dates: 24–28 July 2014
- Competitors: 66 from 22 nations

Medalists
gold medal	Prince Neluonde; Petrus Breitenbach; Bobby Donnelly	South Africa
silver medal	Paul Daly; Neil Mulholland; Neil Booth	Northern Ireland
bronze medal	Paul Taylor; Jonathan Tomlinson; Marc Wyatt	Wales

The Men's triple at the 2014 Commonwealth Games, was part of the lawn bowls competition, which took place between 24 and 28 July 2014 at the Kelvingrove Lawn Bowls Centre. South Africa won the gold medal, defeating Northern Ireland in the final. Wales won the bronze medal.

== Sectional play ==
=== Section A ===
Rank	Nation	Team	MP	MW	MT	ML	For	Ag	PD	Pts
1	Wales	Paul Taylor, Jonathan Tomlinson, Marc Wyatt	4	4	0	0	92	35	+57	12
2	Scotland	Darren Burnett, David Peacock, Neil Speirs	4	3	0	1	93	47	+46	9
3	Namibia	Gedion Appollis, Ewald Vermeulen, Steven Peake	4	2	0	2	61	69	-8	6
4	India	Kamal Kumar Sharma, Sunil Bahadur, Samit Malhorta	4	1	0	3	52	71	-19	3
5	Niue	Keith Papani, Asu Pulu, Karl Samupo	4	0	0	4	32	108	-76	0

24 July, 08:45
Team	1	2	3	4	5	6	7	8	9	10	11	12	13	14	15	16	17	18	Final
Scotland	2	4	5	7	7	8	10	13	14	15	15	19	19	20	22	22	26	27	27
India	0	0	0	0	1	1	1	1	1	1	2	2	4	4	4	6	6	6	6
Report

24 July, 08:45
Team	1	2	3	4	5	6	7	8	9	10	11	12	13	14	15	16	17	18	Final
Wales	4	5	5	5	6	8	9	12	12	12	15	18	18	24	26	30	31	34	34
Niue	0	0	1	2	2	2	2	2	3	4	4	4	5	5	5	5	5	5	5
Report

24 July, 15:45
Team	1	2	3	4	5	6	7	8	9	10	11	12	13	14	15	16	17	18	Final
Wales	1	4	5	7	7	10	11	13	13	15	16	16	16	16	20	21	24	24	24
Namibia	0	0	0	0	2	2	2	2	3	3	3	4	5	6	6	6	6	7	7
Report

24 July, 15:45
Team	1	2	3	4	5	6	7	8	9	10	11	12	13	14	15	16	17	18	Final
Niue	0	1	2	3	3	3	3	3	5	5	5	5	7	8	10	11	11	12	12
India	2	2	2	2	3	7	8	9	9	10	15	17	17	17	17	17	21	21	21
Report

25 July, 08:45
Team	1	2	3	4	5	6	7	8	9	10	11	12	13	14	15	16	17	18	Final
Scotland	1	2	4	4	6	8	12	15	17	20	23	27	27	27	28	30	32	32	32
Niue	0	0	0	1	1	1	1	1	1	1	1	1	2	3	3	3	3	6	6
Report

25 July, 08:45
Team	1	2	3	4	5	6	7	8	9	10	11	12	13	14	15	16	17	18	Final
Namibia	0	0	1	1	1	1	2	3	3	5	7	7	8	8	10	10	13	15	15
India	1	2	2	3	4	5	5	5	6	6	6	7	7	10	10	12	12	12	12
Report

25 July, 15:45
Team	1	2	3	4	5	6	7	8	9	10	11	12	13	14	15	16	17	18	Final
Scotland	0	0	2	5	7	11	11	13	16	19	19	21	22	22	22	24	24	24	24
Namibia	1	4	4	4	4	4	8	8	8	8	10	10	10	11	12	12	17	18	18
Report

25 July, 15:45
Team	1	2	3	4	5	6	7	8	9	10	11	12	13	14	15	16	17	18	Final
Scotland	0	0	2	5	7	11	11	13	16	19	19	21	22	22	22	24	24	24	24
Namibia	1	4	4	4	4	4	8	8	8	8	10	10	10	11	12	12	17	18	18
Report

25 July, 15:45
Team	1	2	3	4	5	6	7	8	9	10	11	12	13	14	15	16	17	18	Final
Wales	1	1	4	4	4	6	9	10	13	14	14	16	16	17	17	17	17	17	17
India	0	1	1	2	3	3	3	3	3	3	6	6	7	7	9	10	11	13	13
Report

26 July, 08:45
Team	1	2	3	4	5	6	7	8	9	10	11	12	13	14	15	16	17	18	Final
Scotland	1	1	1	2	3	5	6	6	6	7	8	8	8	9	10	10	10	10	10
Wales	0	3	4	4	4	4	4	5	8	8	8	12	13	13	13	14	16	17	17
Report

26 July, 08:45
Team	1	2	3	4	5	6	7	8	9	10	11	12	13	14	15	16	17	18	Final
Namibia	0	1	5	5	5	5	5	5	9	10	11	12	13	16	17	17	20	21	21
Niue	2	2	2	3	4	5	6	8	8	8	8	8	8	8	8	9	9	9	9
Report

=== Section B ===
Rank	Nation	Team	MP	MW	MT	ML	For	Ag	PD	Pts
1	Australia	Wayne Ruediger, Nathan Rice, Matt Flapper	5	5	0	0	96	57	+39	15
2	England	John McGuinness, Stuart Airey & Jamie Chestney	5	4	0	1	107	60	+47	12
3	Malaysia	Fairus Jabal, Zulhilmie Redzuan & Mohd Amir Mohd Yusof	5	3	0	2	100	67	+33	9
4	Falkland Islands	Patrick Morrison, Barry Ford, Michael Reive	5	2	0	3	61	112	-51	6
5	Papua New Guinea	Patrick Ikirima, Harry Doutara & Lucas Roika	5	1	0	4	67	88	-21	3
6	Pakistan	Maqsood Khan, Mohammed Qureshi & Muzahir Shan	5	0	0	5	60	107	-47	0

24 July, 08:45
Team	1	2	3	4	5	6	7	8	9	10	11	12	13	14	15	16	17	18	Final
Australia	2	2	2	2	7	7	8	9	9	10	10	11	11	11	12	14	18	19	19
Pakistan	0	1	3	6	6	7	7	7	8	8	9	9	11	12	12	12	12	12	12
Report

24 July, 08:45
Team	1	2	3	4	5	6	7	8	9	10	11	12	13	14	15	16	17	18	Final
Malaysia	4	5	5	5	5	5	5	6	6	7	8	8	8	9	10	12	14	17	17
Papua New Guinea	0	0	2	4	7	8	11	11	12	12	12	14	15	15	15	15	15	15	15
Report

24 July, 08:45
Team	1	2	3	4	5	6	7	8	9	10	11	12	13	14	15	16	17	18	Final
England	4	7	10	10	13	13	16	19	19	22	23	23	24	24	24	26	28	31	31
Falkland Islands	0	0	0	1	1	3	3	3	4	4	4	5	5	6	8	8	8	8	8
Report

24 July, 15:45
Team	1	2	3	4	5	6	7	8	9	10	11	12	13	14	15	16	17	18	Final
Australia	2	2	3	3	3	4	7	8	11	13	14	15	18	20	20	20	21	23	23
Falkland Islands	0	1	1	2	3	3	3	3	3	3	3	3	3	3	4	5	5	5	5
Report

24 July, 15:45
Team	1	2	3	4	5	6	7	8	9	10	11	12	13	14	15	16	17	18	Final
Malaysia	1	1	1	5	6	7	7	8	9	9	9	9	9	9	10	13	13	13	13
England	0	1	3	3	3	3	5	5	5	7	8	9	10	12	12	12	14	15	15
Report

24 July, 15:45
Team	1	2	3	4	5	6	7	8	9	10	11	12	13	14	15	16	17	18	Final
Papua New Guinea	1	1	2	3	3	4	5	5	8	8	8	11	11	11	11	14	15	17	17
Pakistan	0	2	2	2	3	3	3	5	5	6	7	7	8	10	12	12	12	12	12
Report

25 July, 08:45
Team	1	2	3	4	5	6	7	8	9	10	11	12	13	14	15	16	17	18	Final
Australia	2	2	4	5	5	7	8	9	9	10	11	15	15	15	17	18	18	20	20
Papua New Guinea	0	1	1	1	4	4	4	4	6	6	6	6	7	9	9	9	10	10	10
Report

25 July, 08:45
Team	1	2	3	4	5	6	7	8	9	10	11	12	13	14	15	16	17	18	Final
Malaysia	1	5	9	11	11	13	13	14	15	20	21	23	23	24	24	25	29	31	31
Falkland Islands	0	0	0	0	3	3	4	4	4	4	4	4	7	7	8	8	8	8	8
Report

25 July, 08:45
Team	1	2	3	4	5	6	7	8	9	10	11	12	13	14	15	16	17	18	Final
England	2	4	6	6	9	9	11	11	11	11	11	14	17	18	18	18	21	24	24
Pakistan	0	0	0	1	1	2	2	3	5	6	7	7	7	7	8	9	9	9	9
Report

25 July, 15:45
Team	1	2	3	4	5	6	7	8	9	10	11	12	13	14	15	16	17	18	Final
Australia	2	3	4	5	6	8	8	8	10	12	13	13	13	13	13	13	15	17	17
England	0	0	0	0	0	0	3	5	5	5	5	6	11	12	14	15	15	15	15
Report

25 July, 15:45
Team	1	2	3	4	5	6	7	8	9	10	11	12	13	14	15	16	17	18	Final
Malaysia	1	3	7	10	10	14	15	15	17	17	19	19	19	23	23	23	23	24	24
Pakistan	0	0	0	0	1	1	1	2	2	5	5	6	8	8	10	11	12	12	12
Report

25 July, 15:45
Team	1	2	3	4	5	6	7	8	9	10	11	12	13	14	15	16	17	18	Final
Papua New Guinea	0	0	0	0	0	2	2	3	6	6	8	8	8	8	10	10	10	12	12
Falkland Islands	1	4	5	6	7	7	8	8	8	9	9	10	11	13	13	15	17	17	17
Report

26 July, 08:45
Team	1	2	3	4	5	6	7	8	9	10	11	12	13	14	15	16	17	18	Final
Australia	2	2	5	5	7	8	9	11	11	11	11	11	12	13	15	17	17	17	17
Malaysia	0	2	2	5	5	5	5	5	6	7	9	9	9	12	12	12	13	15	15
Report

26 July, 08:45
Team	1	2	3	4	5	6	7	8	9	10	11	12	13	14	15	16	17	18	Final
England	2	6	8	10	11	11	14	14	14	15	15	16	18	18	18	18	19	22	22
Papua New Guinea	0	0	0	0	0	2	2	3	6	6	6	8	8	10	11	13	13	13	13
Report

26 July, 08:45
Team	1	2	3	4	5	6	7	8	9	10	11	12	13	14	15	16	17	18	Final
Pakistan	4	4	4	4	6	9	9	9	9	9	10	13	15	15	15	15	15	15	15
Falkland Islands	0	1	2	3	3	3	4	5	7	13	13	13	13	15	16	17	19	23	23
Report

=== Section C ===
Rank	Nation	Team	MP	MW	MT	ML	For	Ag	PD	Pts
1	New Zealand	Ali Forsyth, Shannon McIlroy, Tony Grantham	5	5	0	0	113	54	+59	15
2	Jersey	Greg Davis, Jamie MacDonald, John Lowery	5	4	0	1	111	58	+53	12
3	Guernsey	Garry Collins, Todd Priaulx, Matt Le Ber	5	3	0	2	86	73	+13	9
4	Canada	Kevin Jones, Tim Mason, Chris Stadnyk	5	2	0	3	76	90	-14	6
5	Norfolk Island	Phil Jones, Pete Walkinshaw, Baz Wilson	5	1	0	4	56	104	-48	3
6	Zambia	Bright Mwanza, Mweetwa Siamoongwa, George Chibwe	5	0	0	5	51	117	-63	0

24 July, 08:45
Team	1	2	3	4	5	6	7	8	9	10	11	12	13	14	15	16	17	18	Final
New Zealand	0	1	2	2	4	5	6	6	9	9	10	11	13	13	14	14	14	16	16
Guernsey	1	1	1	3	3	3	3	4	4	7	7	7	7	8	8	9	13	13	13
Report

24 July, 08:45
Team	1	2	3	4	5	6	7	8	9	10	11	12	13	14	15	16	17	18	Final
Jersey	3	6	9	11	11	13	13	13	16	16	18	20	21	21	22	26	27	31	31
Zambia	0	0	0	0	1	1	2	7	7	8	8	8	8	9	9	9	9	9	9
Report

24 July, 08:45
Team	1	2	3	4	5	6	7	8	9	10	11	12	13	14	15	16	17	18	Final
Canada	1	1	2	4	4	6	6	7	10	10	10	13	14	14	17	18	18	18	18
Norfolk Island	0	1	1	1	2	2	3	3	3	4	7	7	7	8	8	8	10	11	11
Report

24 July, 15:45
Team	1	2	3	4	5	6	7	8	9	10	11	12	13	14	15	16	17	18	Final
New Zealand	2	7	11	13	13	13	14	17	18	20	20	22	22	23	24	25	26	29	29
Norfolk Island	0	0	0	0	2	3	5	5	5	5	5	6	6	6	6	6	6	6	6
Report

24 July, 15:45
Team	1	2	3	4	5	6	7	8	9	10	11	12	13	14	15	16	17	18	Final
Jersey	1	2	5	5	5	9	12	15	15	15	15	17	19	19	21	25	27	28	28
Canada	0	0	0	3	5	5	5	5	6	7	8	8	8	10	10	10	10	10	10
Report

24 July, 15:45
Team	1	2	3	4	5	6	7	8	9	10	11	12	13	14	15	16	17	18	Final
Zambia	0	0	0	0	0	2	3	3	4	4	5	7	7	8	8	9	9	11	11
Guernsey	2	4	7	8	10	10	10	11	11	12	12	12	13	13	14	14	16	16	16
Report

25 July, 08:45
Team	1	2	3	4	5	6	7	8	9	10	11	12	13	14	15	16	17	18	Final
New Zealand	0	2	3	4	6	8	8	8	11	13	13	17	18	18	18	21	21	26	26
Zambia	1	1	1	1	1	1	3	4	4	4	6	6	6	8	9	9	10	10	10
Report

25 July, 08:45
Team	1	2	3	4	5	6	7	8	9	10	11	12	13	14	15	16	17	18	Final
Jersey	0	1	4	4	5	5	7	9	9	10	10	10	13	14	15	18	18	19	19
Norfolk Island	1	1	1	2	2	3	3	3	4	4	5	7	7	7	7	7	8	8	8
Report

25 July, 08:45
Team	1	2	3	4	5	6	7	8	9	10	11	12	13	14	15	16	17	18	Final
Canada	2	2	3	5	5	5	5	5	5	7	8	9	10	12	12	13	16	16	16
Guernsey	0	1	1	1	4	6	9	10	15	15	15	15	15	15	16	16	16	18	18
Report

25 July, 15:45
Team	1	2	3	4	5	6	7	8	9	10	11	12	13	14	15	16	17	18	Final
New Zealand	2	6	6	6	6	6	11	11	12	13	14	14	19	19	19	19	19	20	20
Canada	0	0	3	6	8	9	9	11	11	11	11	12	12	13	14	15	16	16	16
Report

25 July, 15:45
Team	1	2	3	4	5	6	7	8	9	10	11	12	13	14	15	16	17	18	Final
Jersey	0	1	4	5	7	8	9	10	12	12	13	16	16	16	18	21	21	24	24
Guernsey	3	3	3	3	3	3	3	3	3	5	5	5	6	7	7	7	9	9	9
Report

25 July, 15:45
Team	1	2	3	4	5	6	7	8	9	10	11	12	13	14	15	16	17	18	Final
Zambia	0	2	2	4	5	5	5	5	6	6	6	6	6	6	7	7	8	8	8
Norfolk Island	3	3	6	6	6	12	14	15	15	16	17	18	21	22	22	24	24	25	25
Report

26 July, 08:45
Team	1	2	3	4	5	6	7	8	9	10	11	12	13	14	15	16	17	18	Final
New Zealand	0	2	3	4	4	7	8	10	11	11	11	11	13	16	17	20	20	22	22
Jersey	1	1	1	1	2	2	2	2	2	6	7	8	8	8	8	8	9	9	9
Report

26 July, 08:45
Team	1	2	3	4	5	6	7	8	9	10	11	12	13	14	15	16	17	18	Final
Canada	1	2	5	6	7	9	10	11	12	13	13	14	15	15	15	15	16	16	16
Zambia	0	0	0	0	0	0	0	0	0	0	3	3	3	7	9	10	10	13	13
Report

26 July, 08:45
Team	1	2	3	4	5	6	7	8	9	10	11	12	13	14	15	16	17	18	Final
Guernsey	1	3	4	5	6	6	6	9	11	11	16	16	20	20	21	26	30	30	30
Norfolk Island	0	0	0	0	0	1	2	2	2	3	3	4	4	5	5	5	5	6	6
Report

=== Section D ===
Rank	Nation	Team	MP	MW	MT	ML	For	Ag	PD	Pts
1	Northern Ireland	Paul Daly, Neil Mulholland, Neil Booth	4	3	0	1	78	55	+23	9
2	South Africa	Prince Neluonde, Petrus Breitenbach, Bobby Donnelly	4	3	0	1	68	59	+9	9
3	Fiji	Abdul Kalim, Ratish Lal, Daniel Lum On	4	2	0	2	60	60	0	6
4	Kenya	Joseph Kitosi, Cephas Kimani, Michael Sewe	4	1	1	2	56	72	-16	4
5	Cook Islands	Vaine Henry, Phillip Jim, Pi Paniani	4	0	1	3	48	64	-16	1

24 July, 08:45
Team	1	2	3	4	5	6	7	8	9	10	11	12	13	14	15	16	17	18	Final
Northern Ireland	1	5	5	7	7	7	7	10	12	14	16	16	18	21	21	21	21	21	21
Kenya	0	0	1	1	2	3	4	4	4	4	4	5	5	5	7	8	12	13	13
Report

24 July, 08:45
Team	1	2	3	4	5	6	7	8	9	10	11	12	13	14	15	16	17	18	Final
Fiji	0	0	0	1	3	4	4	5	7	9	10	11	11	12	12	12	13	14	14
Cook Islands	2	3	4	4	4	4	5	5	5	5	5	5	6	6	7	8	8	8	8
Report

24 July, 15:45
Team	1	2	3	4	5	6	7	8	9	10	11	12	13	14	15	16	17	18	Final
Northern Ireland	0	0	0	2	3	7	7	10	11	12	12	12	13	14	14	14	17	17	17
Cook Islands	1	2	4	4	4	4	5	5	5	5	7	8	8	8	10	14	14	15	15
Report

24 July, 15:45
Team	1	2	3	4	5	6	7	8	9	10	11	12	13	14	15	16	17	18	Final
South Africa	3	3	3	3	4	4	6	9	14	14	16	16	16	16	17	17	17	17	17
Fiji	0	1	2	3	3	4	4	4	4	7	7	9	10	12	12	13	14	16	16
Report

25 July, 08:45
Team	1	2	3	4	5	6	7	8	9	10	11	12	13	14	15	16	17	18	Final
South Africa	0	3	5	6	6	6	7	8	8	8	9	12	13	13	14	15	15	18	18
Cook Islands	1	1	1	1	4	5	5	5	6	7	7	7	7	8	8	8	10	10	10
Report

25 July, 08:45
Team	1	2	3	4	5	6	7	8	9	10	11	12	13	14	15	16	17	Final
Fiji	2	2	2	2	4	10	10	11	13	14	14	16	16	16	17	18	22	22
Kenya	0	1	2	3	3	3	6	6	6	6	7	7	8	12	12	12	12	12
Report

25 July, 15:45
Team	1	2	3	4	5	6	7	8	9	10	11	12	13	14	15	16	17	18	Final
Northern Ireland	1	3	5	7	10	10	10	12	14	15	17	17	18	19	22	22	23	23	23
Fiji	0	0	0	0	0	3	4	4	4	4	4	6	6	6	6	7	7	8	8
Report

25 July, 15:45
Team	1	2	3	4	5	6	7	8	9	10	11	12	13	14	15	16	17	18	Final
South Africa	0	0	1	1	2	2	3	7	7	7	7	7	7	10	11	11	13	14	14
Kenya	2	3	3	4	4	5	5	5	8	10	12	13	14	14	14	16	16	16	16
Report

26 July, 08:45
Team	1	2	3	4	5	6	7	8	9	10	11	12	13	14	15	16	17	18	Final
Northern Ireland	1	3	4	7	7	7	7	8	8	8	12	12	13	15	15	15	17	17	17
South Africa	0	0	0	0	2	4	6	6	8	11	11	12	12	12	15	18	18	19	19
Report

26 July, 08:45
Team	1	2	3	4	5	6	7	8	9	10	11	12	13	14	15	16	17	18	Final
Kenya	0	0	3	4	6	6	7	8	8	9	9	10	10	12	12	15	15	15	15
Cook Islands	1	2	2	2	2	4	4	4	7	7	8	8	9	9	10	10	14	15	15
Report

== Knockout stage ==
Quarterfinals
A1	Wales	16
B2	England	15
D1	Northern Ireland	19
A2	Scotland	12
B1	Australia	16
C2	Jersey	13
C1	New Zealand	17
D2	South Africa	19

Semifinals
A1	Wales	12
D1	Northern Ireland	20
B1	Australia	14
D2	South Africa	18

Final
D1	Northern Ireland	10
D2	South Africa	19
Third place
A1	Wales	16
B1	Australia	13

=== Quarterfinals ===
26 July, 16:45
Team	1	2	3	4	5	6	7	8	9	10	11	12	13	14	15	16	17	18	Final
Wales	0	2	5	6	7	7	7	8	11	12	13	15	15	15	15	15	15	16	16
England	1	1	1	1	1	4	5	5	5	5	5	5	7	10	11	13	15	15	15
Report

26 July, 16:45
Team	1	2	3	4	5	6	7	8	9	10	11	12	13	14	15	16	17	18	Final
Australia	1	1	1	3	5	5	5	7	9	9	12	12	13	14	14	16	16	16	16
Jersey	0	1	3	3	3	4	5	5	5	7	7	10	10	10	11	11	12	13	13
Report

26 July, 16:45
Team	1	2	3	4	5	6	7	8	9	10	11	12	13	14	15	16	17	18	Final
New Zealand	3	3	3	3	3	8	8	8	9	10	13	13	13	13	13	13	17	17	17
South Africa	0	2	3	4	6	6	7	11	11	11	11	13	14	15	17	18	18	19	19
Report

26 July, 16:45
Team	1	2	3	4	5	6	7	8	9	10	11	12	13	14	15	16	17	Final
Northern Ireland	0	1	2	2	3	4	4	7	8	9	9	9	12	15	16	18	19	19
Scotland	4	4	4	5	5	5	7	7	7	7	10	12	12	12	12	12	12	12
Report

=== Semifinals ===
27 July, 08:45
Team	1	2	3	4	5	6	7	8	9	10	11	12	13	14	15	16	17	18	Final
Wales	3	4	7	7	7	7	7	8	8	8	10	10	10	10	12	12	12	12	12
Northern Ireland	0	0	0	3	4	5	6	6	7	8	8	12	13	14	14	16	18	20	20
Report

27 July, 08:45
Team	1	2	3	4	5	6	7	8	9	10	11	12	13	14	15	16	17	18	Final
Australia	0	1	4	5	5	5	5	5	5	6	7	11	12	12	13	13	14	14	14
South Africa	3	3	3	3	4	7	9	11	13	13	13	13	13	14	14	16	16	16	16
Report

=== Finals ===
==== Gold medal ====
28 July, 08:45
Rank	Team	1	2	3	4	5	6	7	8	9	10	11	12	13	14	15	16	17	Final
2nd place, silver medalist(s)	Northern Ireland	0	0	1	2	2	2	2	3	3	3	3	5	8	10	10	10	10	10
1st place, gold medalist(s)	South Africa	1	2	2	2	3	5	6	6	9	11	14	14	14	14	16	17	19	19
Report

==== Bronze medal ====
28 July, 08:45
Rank	Team	1	2	3	4	5	6	7	8	9	10	11	12	13	14	15	16	17	18	Final
3rd place, bronze medalist(s)	Wales	1	2	4	4	6	6	6	8	10	10	11	11	12	12	13	16	16	16	16
4	Australia	0	0	0	2	2	5	7	7	7	9	9	10	10	11	11	11	12	13	13
Report
