= Robert Love (disambiguation) =

Robert Love (born 1981) is an American software engineer and author.

Robert Love or Bob Love may also refer to:

- Robert Love (soldier) (1760–1845), soldier in the American Revolutionary War
- Joseph Robert Love (1839–1914), known as Dr. Robert Love, Bahamian-born medical doctor, clergyman, teacher, journalist, and politician
- Bob Love (footballer) (1896–1960), Australian footballer
- Robert J. Love (1917–1986), American Korean War fighter ace
- Bob Love (1942–2024), American basketball player
- Bob Love (bowls) (born 1954), British bowler
- Robert Love, American naval historian
- Robert Love, journalist and biographer of Pierre Bernard
