= Lawn bowls at the 2014 Commonwealth Games – Men's fours =

Lawn bowls – Men's fours at the 2014 Commonwealth Games
- Venue: Kelvingrove Lawn Bowls Centre
- Dates: 27 July – 01 August 2014
- Competitors: 80 from 20 nations

Medalists
gold medal	Alex Marshall; David Peacock; Neil Speirs; Paul Foster	Scotland
silver medal	Andrew Knapper; Jamie Chestney; John McGuinness; Stuart Airey	England
bronze medal	Brett Wilkie; Matt Flapper; Nathan Rice; Wayne Ruediger	Australia

The Men's fours at the 2014 Commonwealth Games, was part of the lawn bowls competition, which took place between 27 July and 1 August 2014 at the Kelvingrove Lawn Bowls Centre. Scotland won the gold medal, defeating England in the final. Australia won the bronze medal.

== Sectional play ==
=== Section A ===
Rank	Nation	Team	MP	MW	MT	ML	For	Ag	PD	Pts
1	Australia	Wayne Ruediger, Brett Wilkie; Matt Flapper, Nathan Rice	4	4	0	0	72	37	+35	12
2	Norfolk Island	Phil Jones, Pete Walkinshaw; Tim Sheridan, Baz Wilson	4	2	0	2	37	58	-21	6
3	New Zealand	Ali Forsyth, Richard Girvan; Blake Signal, Tony Grantham	4	1	1	2	61	55	+6	4
4	Malaysia	Fairus Jabal, Zulhilmie Redzuan; Mohd Amir Mohd Yusof, Fairul Izwan Abd Muin	4	1	1	2	62	59	+3	4
5	Papua New Guinea	Patrick Ikirima, Harry Doutara; Lucas Roika, Joe Morgan	4	1	0	3	35	58	-23	3

27 July, 12:30
Team	1	2	3	4	5	6	7	8	9	10	11	12	13	14	15	Final
Australia	1	4	4	8	8	8	10	11	13	14	16	17	17	17	20	20
Papua New Guinea	0	0	1	1	3	4	4	4	4	4	4	4	6	8	8	8
Report

27 July, 12:30
Team	1	2	3	4	5	6	7	8	9	10	11	12	13	14	15	Final
New Zealand	0	3	5	5	5	9	12	12	15	15	18	20	22	22	26	26
Norfolk Island	2	2	2	3	4	4	4	5	5	6	6	6	6	9	9	9
Report

28 July, 17:45
Team	1	2	3	4	5	6	7	8	9	10	11	12	13	14	15	Final
New Zealand	0	0	0	3	3	3	3	5	6	6	10	11	12	13	14	14
Malaysia	2	4	5	5	7	8	9	9	9	14	14	14	14	14	14	14
Report

28 July, 17:45
Team	1	2	3	4	5	6	7	8	9	10	11	12	13	14	15	Final
Norfolk Island	0	0	0	0	0	0	0	0	0	0	0	0	0	0	0	W/O
Papua New Guinea	0	0	0	0	0	0	0	0	0	0	0	0	0	0	0	DNS
Report

29 July, 11:45
Team	1	2	3	4	5	6	7	8	9	10	11	12	13	14	15	Final
Australia	3	3	7	9	10	10	10	10	10	12	14	15	17	19	20	20
Norfolk Island	0	1	1	1	1	2	6	8	10	10	10	10	10	10	10	10
Report

29 July, 11:45
Team	1	2	3	4	5	6	7	8	9	10	11	12	13	14	15	Final
Malaysia	0	0	2	4	9	13	16	20	20	21	24	24	24	24	26	26
Papua New Guinea	1	3	3	3	3	3	3	3	5	5	5	7	9	11	11	11
Report

29 July, 18:45
Team	1	2	3	4	5	6	7	8	9	10	11	12	13	14	15	Final
Australia	0	3	4	4	6	7	7	7	7	9	9	10	14	14	16	16
Malaysia	1	1	1	3	3	3	5	6	7	7	8	8	8	10	10	10
Report

29 July, 18:45
Team	1	2	3	4	5	6	7	8	9	10	11	12	13	14	15	Final
New Zealand	0	0	1	1	2	5	7	8	8	10	11	12	12	12	12	12
Papua New Guinea	4	8	8	9	9	9	9	9	10	10	10	10	12	13	16	16
Report

30 July, 15:45
Team	1	2	3	4	5	6	7	8	9	10	11	12	13	14	15	Final
Australia	1	1	2	3	3	3	5	5	6	7	9	13	13	15	16	16
New Zealand	0	2	2	2	3	6	6	7	7	7	7	7	9	9	9	9
Report

30 July, 15:45
Team	1	2	3	4	5	6	7	8	9	10	11	12	13	14	15	Final
Malaysia	0	0	2	3	3	3	7	9	9	10	12	12	12	12	12	12
Norfolk Island	3	7	7	7	8	10	10	10	11	11	11	13	15	17	18	18
Report

=== Section B ===
Rank	Nation	Team	MP	MW	MT	ML	For	Ag	PD	Pts
1	India	Kamal Kumar Sharma, Chandan Kumar Singh; Samit Malhorta, Dinesh Kumar	4	4	0	0	74	38	+36	12
2	South Africa	Prince Neluonde, Petrus Breitenbach; Jason Evans, Gerry Baker	4	3	0	1	82	42	+40	9
3	Canada	Kevin Jones, Tim Mason; Chris Stadnyk, George Whitelaw	4	2	0	2	45	50	-5	6
4	Falkland Islands	Gerald Reive, Michael Reive; Patrick Morrison, Barry Ford	4	1	0	3	29	89	-60	3
5	Namibia	Gedion Appollis, Ewald Vermeulen; Steven Peake, Douw Calitz	4	0	0	4	43	54	-11	0

27 July, 12:30
Team	1	2	3	4	5	6	7	8	9	10	11	12	13	14	15	Final
South Africa	0	1	1	6	7	7	8	8	8	9	10	10	11	12	12	12
India	3	3	5	5	5	6	6	9	11	11	11	13	13	13	17	17
Report

27 July, 12:30
Team	1	2	3	4	5	6	7	8	9	10	11	12	13	14	15	Final
Canada	2	3	3	5	5	5	6	9	11	13	14	14	14	14	16	16
Falkland Islands	0	0	1	1	2	3	3	3	3	3	3	4	5	6	6	6
Report

28 July, 17:45
Team	1	2	3	4	5	6	7	8	9	10	11	12	13	14	15	Final
Canada	0	1	1	1	2	2	2	2	2	5	5	8	9	11	11	11
Namibia	1	1	2	3	3	4	5	6	8	8	9	9	9	9	10	10
Report

28 July, 17:45
Team	1	2	3	4	5	6	7	8	9	10	11	12	13	14	15	Final
Falkland Islands	1	1	2	2	3	3	3	3	3	4	4	5	5	6	6	6
India	0	1	1	2	2	3	4	8	10	10	12	12	17	17	22	22
Report

29 July, 11:45
Team	1	2	3	4	5	6	7	8	9	10	11	12	13	14	15	Final
South Africa	4	4	11	12	13	14	20	26	28	28	28	31	34	39	40	40
Falkland Islands	0	1	1	1	1	1	1	1	1	3	5	5	5	5	5	5
Report

29 July, 11:45
Team	1	2	3	4	5	6	7	8	9	10	11	12	13	14	15	Final
Namibia	2	2	2	2	4	4	4	4	5	6	7	11	11	11	12	12
India	0	1	3	8	8	12	13	15	15	15	15	15	16	17	17	17
Report

29 July, 18:45
Team	1	2	3	4	5	6	7	8	9	10	11	12	13	14	15	Final
South Africa	1	2	3	5	7	7	8	10	10	10	12	12	13	14	14	14
Namibia	0	0	0	0	0	1	1	1	3	4	4	7	7	7	10	10
Report

29 July, 18:45
Team	1	2	3	4	5	6	7	8	9	10	11	12	13	14	15	Final
Canada	0	1	2	2	2	3	3	3	5	5	6	6	6	8	8	8
India	2	2	2	3	5	5	8	9	9	10	10	13	14	14	18	18
Report

30 July, 15:45
Team	1	2	3	4	5	6	7	8	9	10	11	12	13	14	15	Final
South Africa	1	2	3	4	4	4	4	4	5	7	8	12	15	15	16	16
Canada	0	0	0	0	1	2	5	9	9	9	9	9	9	10	10	10
Report

30 July, 15:45
Team	1	2	3	4	5	6	7	8	9	10	11	12	13	14	15	Final
Namibia	4	4	4	4	4	4	6	7	8	10	10	10	10	10	11	11
Falkland Islands	0	1	3	5	6	8	8	8	8	8	9	10	11	12	12	12
Report

=== Section C ===
Rank	Nation	Team	MP	MW	MT	ML	For	Ag	PD	Pts
1	England	Andrew Knapper, Jamie Chestney; John McGuinness, Stuart Airey	4	3	1	0	67	44	+23	9
2	Northern Ireland	Neil Booth, Paul Daly; Ian McClure, Neil Mulholland	4	2	1	1	56	40	+16	7
3	Cook Islands	Vaine Henry, Phillip Jim; Pi Paniani, Tuatiaki Papatua	4	2	0	2	47	66	-19	6
4	Jersey	Greg Davis, Jamie MacDonald; John Lowery, Thomas Greechan	4	1	0	3	51	58	-7	3
5	Zambia	Bright Mwanza, Mweetwa Siamoongwa; Christe Kapata, George Chibwe	4	1	0	3	44	57	-13	3

27 July, 12:30
Team	1	2	3	4	5	6	7	8	9	10	11	12	13	14	15	Final
Northern Ireland	1	1	1	2	2	3	3	5	5	6	6	8	9	9	11	11
Zambia	0	1	5	5	6	6	7	7	8	8	9	9	9	10	10	10
Report

27 July, 12:30
Team	1	2	3	4	5	6	7	8	9	10	11	12	13	14	15	Final
England	2	2	2	6	8	8	12	14	14	17	17	20	20	20	22	22
Cook Islands	0	2	3	3	3	4	4	4	5	5	9	9	10	11	11	11
Report

28 July, 17:45
Team	1	2	3	4	5	6	7	8	9	10	11	12	13	14	Final
England	2	4	4	4	5	5	5	11	11	11	11	14	14	14	14
Jersey	0	0	1	2	2	4	5	5	6	7	8	8	11	12	12
Report

28 July, 17:45
Team	1	2	3	4	5	6	7	8	9	10	11	12	13	14	Final
Cook Islands	1	1	2	2	3	7	7	7	10	10	12	12	12	14	14
Zambia	0	1	1	3	3	3	6	7	7	8	8	9	11	11	11
Report

29 July, 11:45
Team	1	2	3	4	5	6	7	8	9	10	11	12	13	14	Final
Northern Ireland	1	1	2	4	7	9	9	11	12	14	15	15	19	21	21
Cook Islands	0	2	2	2	2	2	3	3	3	3	3	4	4	4	4
Report

29 July, 11:45
Team	1	2	3	4	5	6	7	8	9	10	11	12	13	14	15	Final
Jersey	0	2	4	4	5	6	9	11	11	12	12	12	12	13	13	13
Zambia	3	3	3	4	4	4	4	4	5	5	7	10	13	13	14	14
Report

29 July, 18:45
Team	1	2	3	4	5	6	7	8	9	10	11	12	13	14	Final
Northern Ireland	1	1	1	1	1	2	3	5	7	7	9	10	10	12	12
Jersey	0	1	3	8	12	12	12	12	12	13	13	13	14	14	14
Report

29 July, 18:45
Team	1	2	3	4	5	6	7	8	9	10	11	12	13	14	15	Final
England	0	3	3	6	8	10	11	12	12	12	18	19	19	19	19	19
Zambia	3	3	4	4	4	4	4	4	5	6	6	6	7	8	9	9
Report

30 July, 15:45
Team	1	2	3	4	5	6	7	8	9	10	11	12	13	14	Final
Northern Ireland	1	1	1	5	5	6	6	6	6	8	10	10	10	12	12
England	0	1	2	2	4	4	6	7	9	9	9	11	12	12	12
Report

30 July, 15:45
Team	1	2	3	4	5	6	7	8	9	10	11	12	13	14	15	Final
Jersey	0	0	0	2	5	6	6	9	9	11	11	11	12	12	12	12
Cook Islands	1	3	4	4	4	4	7	7	12	12	15	16	16	17	18	18
Report

=== Section D ===
Rank	Team	Team	MP	MW	MT	ML	For	Ag	PD	Pts
1	Scotland	Paul Foster, Alex Marshall; David Peacock, Neil Speirs	4	4	0	0	67	43	+24	12
2	Wales	Mark Harding, Paul Taylor; Jonathan Tomlinson, Marc Wyatt	4	3	0	1	75	36	+39	9
3	Fiji	Abdul Kalim, Arun Kumar; Ratish Lal, Daniel Lum On	4	2	0	2	60	43	+17	6
4	Kenya	Joseph Kitosi, Gichango Njuguna; Cephas Kimanio, Michael Sewe	4	1	0	3	51	57	-6	3
5	Niue	Keith Papani, Asu Pulu; Karl Samupo, Frederick Tafatu	4	0	0	4	28	102	-74	0

27 July, 12:30
Team	1	2	3	4	5	6	7	8	9	10	11	12	13	14	15	Final
Scotland	0	2	2	3	7	11	12	12	15	17	19	20	22	22	22	22
Niue	2	2	3	3	3	3	3	4	4	4	4	4	4	5	9	9
Report

27 July, 12:30
Team	1	2	3	4	5	6	7	8	9	10	11	12	13	14	15	Final
Fiji	0	3	3	5	6	6	7	10	11	11	12	14	15	15	17	17
Kenya	3	3	4	4	4	5	5	5	5	6	6	6	6	7	7	7
Report

28 July, 17:45
Team	1	2	3	4	5	6	7	8	9	10	11	12	13	14	15	Final
Scotland	0	1	1	5	6	8	8	8	10	10	12	13	13	13	16	16
Kenya	1	1	2	2	2	2	3	4	4	7	7	7	9	10	10	10
Report

28 July, 17:45
Team	1	2	3	4	5	6	7	8	9	10	11	12	13	14	Final
Wales	1	2	2	4	4	4	7	7	9	9	12	13	13	13	16
Fiji	0	0	1	1	2	3	3	4	4	5	5	5	6	7	7
Report

29 July, 11:45
Team	1	2	3	4	5	6	7	8	9	10	11	12	13	14	15	Final
Wales	2	4	5	7	7	8	9	9	10	10	14	16	16	21	21	21
Kenya	0	0	0	0	3	3	3	4	4	5	5	5	6	6	7	7
Report

29 July, 11:45
Team	1	2	3	4	5	6	7	8	9	10	11	12	13	14	15	Final
Fiji	5	5	5	6	7	8	9	9	12	14	16	17	21	21	21	21
Niue	0	1	2	2	2	2	2	3	3	3	3	3	3	4	6	6
Report

29 July, 18:45
Team	1	2	3	4	5	6	7	8	9	10	11	12	13	14	15	Final
Scotland	0	0	0	0	3	3	4	7	9	11	13	15	17	17	17	17
Fiji	4	5	7	11	11	12	12	12	12	12	12	12	12	13	15	15
Report

29 July, 18:45
Team	1	2	3	4	5	6	7	8	9	10	11	12	13	14	15	Final
Wales	0	5	8	10	10	12	17	17	20	25	25	30	30	32	32	32
Niue	1	1	1	1	3	3	3	4	4	4	6	6	8	8	10	10
Report

30 July, 15:45
Team	1	2	3	4	5	6	7	8	9	10	11	12	13	14	15	Final
Scotland	0	0	2	2	5	6	6	7	7	7	8	8	11	11	12	12
Wales	1	2	2	3	3	3	4	4	6	7	7	8	8	9	9	9
Report

30 July, 15:45
Team	1	2	3	4	5	6	7	8	9	10	11	12	13	14	15	Final
Niue	0	0	0	0	1	1	1	1	1	1	1	1	1	3	3	3
Kenya	2	4	6	7	7	11	14	18	19	22	23	24	25	25	27	27
Report

== Knockout stage ==
Quarterfinals
A1	Australia	19
D2	Wales	14
D1	Scotland	15
B2	South Africa	7
B1	India	26
A2	Norfolk Island	4
C1	England	18
C2	Northern Ireland	11

Semifinals
A1	Australia	10
D1	Scotland	15
B1	India	12
C1	England	14

Finals
D1	Scotland	16
C1	England	8
Third place
A1	Australia	15
B1	India	14

=== Quarterfinals ===
31 July, 12:45
Team	1	2	3	4	5	6	7	8	9	10	11	12	13	14	15	Final
Australia	3	3	3	4	7	7	11	11	15	15	15	15	15	17	19	19
Wales	0	1	2	2	2	4	4	6	6	8	10	11	14	14	14	14
Report

31 July, 12:45
Team	1	2	3	4	5	6	7	8	9	10	11	12	Final
India	1	6	8	13	14	14	21	23	25	25	26	26	26
Norfolk Island	0	0	0	0	0	1	1	1	1	2	2	4	4
Report

31 July, 12:45
Team	1	2	3	4	5	6	7	8	9	10	11	12	13	14	15	Final
England	0	3	4	6	7	8	8	8	9	9	9	9	16	17	18	18
Northern Ireland	1	1	1	1	1	1	3	5	5	7	9	11	11	11	11	11
Report

31 July, 12:45
Team	1	2	3	4	5	6	7	8	9	10	11	12	13	14	Final
Scotland	1	3	3	3	3	6	7	9	11	11	11	13	13	14	14
South Africa	0	0	2	3	4	4	4	4	4	5	6	6	7	7	7
Report

=== Semifinals ===
31 July, 17:30
Team	1	2	3	4	5	6	7	8	9	10	11	12	13	14	15	Final
Australia	1	1	1	1	2	3	4	4	5	5	5	6	6	8	10	10
Scotland	0	1	3	7	7	7	7	9	9	12	14	14	15	15	15	15
Report

31 July, 17:30
Team	1	2	3	4	5	6	7	8	9	10	11	12	13	14	15	Final
India	0	2	5	5	6	6	6	7	8	9	9	9	9	12	12	12
England	3	3	3	4	4	6	7	7	7	7	9	12	13	13	14	14
Report

=== Finals ===
==== Gold medal match ====
01 August, 12:45
Rank	Team	1	2	3	4	5	6	7	8	9	10	11	12	13	14	Final
1st place, gold medalist(s)	Scotland	1	1	4	4	5	6	7	9	10	11	14	14	16	16	16
2nd place, silver medalist(s)	England	0	1	1	5	5	5	5	5	5	5	5	7	7	8	8
Report

==== Bronze medal match ====
01 August, 12:45
Rank	Team	1	2	3	4	5	6	7	8	9	10	11	12	13	14	15	Final
3rd place, bronze medalist(s)	Australia	0	0	2	2	5	5	5	5	9	9	9	11	12	13	15	15
4	India	2	4	4	6	6	9	10	11	11	13	14	14	14	14	14	14
Report
