= Lawn bowls at the 2014 Commonwealth Games – Women's singles =

Lawn bowls – Women's singles at the 2014 Commonwealth Games
- Venue: Kelvingrove Lawn Bowls Centre
- Dates: 24–27 July 2014
- Competitors: 22 (Discipline: Barefoot) from 22 nations

Medalists
| gold medal | Jo Edwards | New Zealand |
| silver medal | Natalie Melmore | England |
| bronze medal | Colleen Piketh | South Africa |

The Women's singles at the 2014 Commonwealth Games, was part of the lawn bowls competition, which took place between 24 and 27 July 2014 at the Kelvingrove Lawn Bowls Centre, Glasgow. New Zealand s Jo Edwards won the gold medal, defeating Natalie Melmore of England in the final. Colleen Piketh from South Africa won the bronze medal.

== Sectional Play ==
=== Section A ===
| Rank | Name | MP | MW | MT | ML | For | Ag | PD | Pts |
|---|---|---|---|---|---|---|---|---|---|
| 1 | Caroline Brown (SCO) | 5 | 4 | 0 | 1 | 95 | 57 | +38 | 12 |
| 2 | Caroline Taylor (WAL) | 5 | 3 | 0 | 2 | 98 | 78 | +20 | 9 |
| 3 | Kelsey Cottrell (AUS) | 5 | 3 | 0 | 2 | 93 | 75 | +18 | 9 |
| 4 | Lucy Beere (GUE) | 5 | 3 | 0 | 2 | 80 | 83 | -3 | 9 |
| 5 | Matimba Like (ZAM) | 5 | 2 | 0 | 3 | 76 | 94 | -18 | 6 |
| 6 | Bernice McGreal (IOM) | 5 | 0 | 0 | 5 | 69 | 105 | -36 | 0 |

24 July, 11:45
| Name | 1 | 2 | 3 | 4 | 5 | 6 | 7 | 8 | 9 | 10 | 11 | 12 | 13 | 14 | Final |
|---|---|---|---|---|---|---|---|---|---|---|---|---|---|---|---|
| Kelsey Cottrell (AUS) | 2 | 2 | 4 | 6 | 6 | 9 | 9 | 9 | 12 | 15 | 15 | 18 | 19 | 21 | 21 |
| Bernice McGreal (IOM) | 0 | 3 | 3 | 3 | 4 | 4 | 5 | 8 | 8 | 8 | 10 | 10 | 10 | 10 | 10 |
Report

24 July, 11:45
| Name | 1 | 2 | 3 | 4 | 5 | 6 | 7 | 8 | 9 | 10 | 11 | 12 | 13 | 14 | Final |
|---|---|---|---|---|---|---|---|---|---|---|---|---|---|---|---|
| Caroline Brown (SCO) | 0 | 0 | 3 | 3 | 4 | 5 | 5 | 6 | 9 | 12 | 15 | 17 | 18 | 21 | 21 |
| Lucy Beere (GUE) | 1 | 2 | 2 | 4 | 4 | 4 | 5 | 5 | 5 | 5 | 5 | 5 | 5 | 5 | 5 |
Report

24 July, 11:45
| Name | 1 | 2 | 3 | 4 | 5 | 6 | 7 | 8 | 9 | 10 | 11 | 12 | 13 | 14 | 15 | 16 | 17 | 18 | 19 | 20 | 21 | 22 | 23 | 24 | 25 | 26 | 27 | 28 | Final |
|---|---|---|---|---|---|---|---|---|---|---|---|---|---|---|---|---|---|---|---|---|---|---|---|---|---|---|---|---|---|
| Caroline Taylor (WAL) | 1 | 1 | 1 | 3 | 4 | 4 | 7 | 7 | 8 | 8 | 9 | 9 | 10 | 11 | 12 | 12 | 12 | 12 | 13 | 13 | 13 | 15 | 15 | 16 | 17 | 18 | 18 | 21 | 21 |
| Matimba Like (ZAM) | 0 | 2 | 3 | 3 | 3 | 4 | 4 | 5 | 5 | 6 | 6 | 7 | 7 | 7 | 7 | 8 | 9 | 10 | 10 | 11 | 12 | 12 | 13 | 13 | 13 | 13 | 15 | 15 | 15 |
Report

24 July, 18:45
| Name | 1 | 2 | 3 | 4 | 5 | 6 | 7 | 8 | 9 | 10 | 11 | 12 | 13 | 14 | 15 | 16 | 17 | 18 | 19 | 20 | 21 | 22 | 23 | 24 | 25 | 26 | Final |
|---|---|---|---|---|---|---|---|---|---|---|---|---|---|---|---|---|---|---|---|---|---|---|---|---|---|---|---|
| Kelsey Cottrell (AUS) | 0 | 0 | 2 | 2 | 2 | 2 | 3 | 3 | 4 | 5 | 5 | 5 | 5 | 6 | 8 | 11 | 13 | 14 | 14 | 15 | 15 | 17 | 19 | 19 | 19 | 19 | 19 |
| Matimba Like (ZAM) | 3 | 4 | 4 | 5 | 7 | 8 | 8 | 9 | 9 | 9 | 10 | 11 | 12 | 12 | 12 | 12 | 12 | 12 | 13 | 13 | 14 | 14 | 14 | 17 | 18 | 21 | 21 |
Report

24 July, 18:45
| Name | 1 | 2 | 3 | 4 | 5 | 6 | 7 | 8 | 9 | 10 | 11 | 12 | 13 | 14 | 15 | 16 | 17 | 18 | 19 | 20 | 21 | 22 | Final |
|---|---|---|---|---|---|---|---|---|---|---|---|---|---|---|---|---|---|---|---|---|---|---|---|
| Caroline Brown (SCO) | 3 | 4 | 7 | 7 | 8 | 11 | 11 | 11 | 13 | 13 | 13 | 16 | 16 | 18 | 18 | 19 | 19 | 19 | 19 | 19 | 20 | 21 | 21 |
| Caroline Taylor (WAL) | 0 | 0 | 0 | 1 | 1 | 1 | 2 | 4 | 4 | 5 | 7 | 7 | 10 | 10 | 12 | 12 | 14 | 16 | 17 | 18 | 18 | 18 | 18 |
Report

24 July, 18:45
| Name | 1 | 2 | 3 | 4 | 5 | 6 | 7 | 8 | 9 | 10 | 11 | 12 | 13 | 14 | 15 | 16 | 17 | 18 | 19 | 20 | 21 | 22 | 23 | Final |
|---|---|---|---|---|---|---|---|---|---|---|---|---|---|---|---|---|---|---|---|---|---|---|---|---|
| Lucy Beere (GUE) | 0 | 1 | 2 | 2 | 2 | 3 | 3 | 6 | 6 | 7 | 8 | 9 | 9 | 11 | 11 | 12 | 13 | 13 | 15 | 19 | 19 | 19 | 21 | 21 |
| Bernice McGreal (IOM) | 1 | 1 | 1 | 2 | 3 | 3 | 4 | 4 | 5 | 5 | 5 | 5 | 6 | 6 | 7 | 7 | 7 | 8 | 8 | 8 | 9 | 10 | 10 | 10 |
Report

25 July, 11:45
| Name | 1 | 2 | 3 | 4 | 5 | 6 | 7 | 8 | 9 | 10 | 11 | 12 | 13 | 14 | 15 | Final |
|---|---|---|---|---|---|---|---|---|---|---|---|---|---|---|---|---|
| Kelsey Cottrell (AUS) | 1 | 5 | 6 | 6 | 6 | 9 | 11 | 11 | 12 | 12 | 13 | 13 | 15 | 17 | 21 | 21 |
| Lucy Beere (GUE) | 0 | 0 | 0 | 1 | 4 | 4 | 4 | 7 | 7 | 8 | 8 | 12 | 12 | 12 | 12 | 12 |
Report

25 July, 11:45
| Name | 1 | 2 | 3 | 4 | 5 | 6 | 7 | 8 | 9 | 10 | 11 | 12 | 13 | 14 | 15 | 16 | 17 | Final |
|---|---|---|---|---|---|---|---|---|---|---|---|---|---|---|---|---|---|---|
| Caroline Brown (SCO) | 3 | 4 | 8 | 8 | 9 | 10 | 10 | 10 | 12 | 14 | 15 | 16 | 18 | 19 | 19 | 19 | 21 | 21 |
| Matimba Like (ZAM) | 0 | 0 | 0 | 1 | 1 | 1 | 2 | 3 | 3 | 3 | 3 | 3 | 3 | 3 | 4 | 5 | 5 | 5 |
Report

25 July, 11:45
| Name | 1 | 2 | 3 | 4 | 5 | 6 | 7 | 8 | 9 | 10 | 11 | 12 | 13 | 14 | 15 | 16 | Final |
|---|---|---|---|---|---|---|---|---|---|---|---|---|---|---|---|---|---|
| Caroline Taylor (WAL) | 0 | 1 | 3 | 3 | 6 | 8 | 8 | 9 | 11 | 11 | 11 | 13 | 17 | 17 | 17 | 21 | 21 |
| Bernice McGreal (IOM) | 2 | 2 | 2 | 4 | 4 | 4 | 6 | 6 | 6 | 7 | 8 | 8 | 8 | 9 | 10 | 10 | 10 |
Report

25 July, 18:45
| Name | 1 | 2 | 3 | 4 | 5 | 6 | 7 | 8 | 9 | 10 | 11 | 12 | 13 | 14 | 15 | 16 | 17 | 18 | 19 | 20 | 21 | Final |
|---|---|---|---|---|---|---|---|---|---|---|---|---|---|---|---|---|---|---|---|---|---|---|
| Kelsey Cottrell (AUS) | 1 | 2 | 2 | 2 | 2 | 2 | 2 | 2 | 2 | 4 | 4 | 5 | 5 | 5 | 5 | 6 | 6 | 6 | 9 | 11 | 11 | 11 |
| Caroline Taylor (WAL) | 0 | 0 | 1 | 3 | 4 | 5 | 7 | 9 | 12 | 12 | 13 | 13 | 14 | 15 | 16 | 16 | 17 | 18 | 18 | 18 | 21 | 21 |
Report

25 July, 18:45
| Name | 1 | 2 | 3 | 4 | 5 | 6 | 7 | 8 | 9 | 10 | 11 | 12 | 13 | 14 | 15 | 16 | 17 | 18 | Final |
|---|---|---|---|---|---|---|---|---|---|---|---|---|---|---|---|---|---|---|---|
| Caroline Brown (SCO) | 3 | 5 | 6 | 6 | 6 | 6 | 10 | 10 | 11 | 13 | 14 | 14 | 15 | 19 | 19 | 20 | 20 | 21 | 21 |
| Bernice McGreal (IOM) | 0 | 0 | 0 | 1 | 2 | 3 | 3 | 5 | 5 | 5 | 5 | 6 | 6 | 6 | 7 | 7 | 8 | 8 | 8 |
Report

25 July, 18:45
| Name | 1 | 2 | 3 | 4 | 5 | 6 | 7 | 8 | 9 | 10 | 11 | 12 | 13 | 14 | 15 | 16 | 17 | 18 | 19 | 20 | Final |
|---|---|---|---|---|---|---|---|---|---|---|---|---|---|---|---|---|---|---|---|---|---|
| Lucy Beere (GUE) | 0 | 3 | 3 | 5 | 7 | 11 | 11 | 14 | 14 | 14 | 14 | 17 | 17 | 17 | 17 | 18 | 18 | 19 | 19 | 21 | 21 |
| Matimba Like (ZAM) | 1 | 1 | 2 | 2 | 2 | 2 | 3 | 3 | 6 | 7 | 8 | 8 | 9 | 10 | 11 | 11 | 12 | 12 | 14 | 14 | 14 |
Report

26 July, 08:45
| Name | 1 | 2 | 3 | 4 | 5 | 6 | 7 | 8 | 9 | 10 | 11 | 12 | 13 | 14 | 15 | 16 | 17 | 18 | Final |
|---|---|---|---|---|---|---|---|---|---|---|---|---|---|---|---|---|---|---|---|
| Kelsey Cottrell (AUS) | 1 | 1 | 3 | 3 | 3 | 3 | 3 | 5 | 9 | 10 | 10 | 11 | 12 | 14 | 15 | 15 | 17 | 21 | 21 |
| Caroline Brown (SCO) | 0 | 1 | 1 | 2 | 5 | 7 | 9 | 9 | 9 | 9 | 10 | 10 | 10 | 10 | 10 | 11 | 11 | 11 | 11 |
Report

26 July, 08:45
| Name | 1 | 2 | 3 | 4 | 5 | 6 | 7 | 8 | 9 | 10 | 11 | 12 | 13 | 14 | 15 | 16 | 17 | 18 | 19 | Final |
|---|---|---|---|---|---|---|---|---|---|---|---|---|---|---|---|---|---|---|---|---|
| Caroline Taylor (WAL) | 0 | 0 | 0 | 0 | 2 | 2 | 2 | 2 | 2 | 2 | 3 | 4 | 4 | 5 | 9 | 12 | 14 | 17 | 17 | 17 |
| Lucy Beere (GUE) | 1 | 2 | 3 | 4 | 4 | 5 | 8 | 11 | 13 | 16 | 16 | 16 | 18 | 18 | 18 | 18 | 18 | 18 | 21 | 21 |
Report

26 July, 08:45
| Name | 1 | 2 | 3 | 4 | 5 | 6 | 7 | 8 | 9 | 10 | 11 | 12 | 13 | 14 | 15 | 16 | 17 | 18 | 19 | 20 | 21 | 22 | 23 | Final |
|---|---|---|---|---|---|---|---|---|---|---|---|---|---|---|---|---|---|---|---|---|---|---|---|---|
| Bernice McGreal (IOM) | 0 | 2 | 2 | 2 | 2 | 3 | 3 | 3 | 3 | 3 | 3 | 4 | 7 | 8 | 9 | 10 | 10 | 11 | 11 | 12 | 12 | 12 | 12 | 12 |
| Matimba Like (ZAM) | 1 | 1 | 2 | 4 | 5 | 5 | 6 | 8 | 9 | 11 | 12 | 12 | 12 | 12 | 12 | 12 | 15 | 15 | 16 | 16 | 17 | 20 | 21 | 21 |
Report

=== Section B ===
| Rank | Name | MP | MW | MT | ML | For | Ag | PD | Pts |
|---|---|---|---|---|---|---|---|---|---|
| 1 | Jo Edwards (NZL) | 4 | 4 | 0 | 0 | 84 | 51 | +33 | 12 |
| 2 | Carmen Anderson (NFI) | 4 | 3 | 0 | 1 | 79 | 54 | +25 | 9 |
| 3 | Nayanmoni Saikia (IND) | 4 | 2 | 0 | 2 | 58 | 67 | -9 | 6 |
| 4 | Siti Zalina Ahmad (MAS) | 4 | 1 | 0 | 3 | 68 | 65 | +3 | 3 |
| 5 | Hina Rereiti (NIU) | 4 | 0 | 0 | 4 | 32 | 84 | -52 | 0 |

24 July, 11:45
| Name | 1 | 2 | 3 | 4 | 5 | 6 | 7 | 8 | 9 | 10 | 11 | 12 | 13 | 14 | 15 | 16 | 17 | 18 | Final |
|---|---|---|---|---|---|---|---|---|---|---|---|---|---|---|---|---|---|---|---|
| Carmen Anderson (NFI) | 1 | 2 | 2 | 5 | 8 | 9 | 9 | 9 | 9 | 10 | 12 | 14 | 14 | 16 | 17 | 17 | 18 | 21 | 21 |
| Hina Rereiti (NIU) | 0 | 0 | 4 | 4 | 4 | 4 | 6 | 7 | 8 | 8 | 8 | 8 | 9 | 9 | 9 | 12 | 12 | 12 | 12 |
Report

24 July, 11:45
| Name | 1 | 2 | 3 | 4 | 5 | 6 | 7 | 8 | 9 | 10 | 11 | 12 | 13 | 14 | 15 | 16 | 17 | 18 | 19 | 20 | Final |
|---|---|---|---|---|---|---|---|---|---|---|---|---|---|---|---|---|---|---|---|---|---|
| Siti Zalina Ahmad (MAS) | 0 | 2 | 4 | 6 | 6 | 6 | 8 | 8 | 8 | 8 | 8 | 8 | 11 | 11 | 11 | 11 | 13 | 13 | 15 | 15 | 15 |
| Nayanmoni Saikia (IND) | 3 | 3 | 3 | 3 | 4 | 6 | 6 | 8 | 11 | 12 | 13 | 14 | 14 | 16 | 17 | 19 | 19 | 20 | 20 | 21 | 21 |
Report

24 July, 18:45
| Name | 1 | 2 | 3 | 4 | 5 | 6 | 7 | 8 | 9 | 10 | 11 | 12 | 13 | 14 | 15 | 16 | 17 | 18 | 19 | 20 | Final |
|---|---|---|---|---|---|---|---|---|---|---|---|---|---|---|---|---|---|---|---|---|---|
| Jo Edwards (NZL) | 0 | 3 | 4 | 4 | 4 | 5 | 6 | 6 | 8 | 9 | 10 | 11 | 11 | 13 | 13 | 15 | 15 | 17 | 18 | 21 | 21 |
| Nayanmoni Saikia (IND) | 2 | 2 | 2 | 3 | 4 | 4 | 4 | 5 | 5 | 5 | 5 | 5 | 6 | 6 | 8 | 8 | 10 | 10 | 10 | 10 | 10 |
Report

24 July, 18:45
| Name | 1 | 2 | 3 | 4 | 5 | 6 | 7 | 8 | 9 | 10 | 11 | 12 | 13 | 14 | 15 | 16 | 17 | 18 | 19 | 20 | 21 | 22 | 23 | Final |
|---|---|---|---|---|---|---|---|---|---|---|---|---|---|---|---|---|---|---|---|---|---|---|---|---|
| Carmen Anderson (NFI) | 0 | 1 | 1 | 3 | 4 | 4 | 4 | 4 | 5 | 5 | 5 | 8 | 9 | 11 | 14 | 16 | 16 | 17 | 18 | 18 | 19 | 20 | 21 | 21 |
| Siti Zalina Ahmad (MAS) | 1 | 1 | 2 | 2 | 2 | 4 | 5 | 7 | 7 | 10 | 12 | 12 | 12 | 12 | 12 | 12 | 14 | 14 | 14 | 15 | 15 | 15 | 15 | 15 |
Report

25 July, 11:45
| Name | 1 | 2 | 3 | 4 | 5 | 6 | 7 | 8 | 9 | 10 | 11 | 12 | 13 | 14 | 15 | Final |
|---|---|---|---|---|---|---|---|---|---|---|---|---|---|---|---|---|
| Jo Edwards (NZL) | 3 | 3 | 3 | 5 | 7 | 10 | 10 | 13 | 13 | 15 | 16 | 16 | 16 | 19 | 21 | 21 |
| Hina Rereiti (NIU) | 0 | 1 | 2 | 2 | 2 | 2 | 3 | 3 | 4 | 4 | 4 | 7 | 8 | 8 | 8 | 8 |
Report

25 July, 11:45
| Name | 1 | 2 | 3 | 4 | 5 | 6 | 7 | 8 | 9 | 10 | 11 | 12 | 13 | 14 | 15 | 16 | Final |
|---|---|---|---|---|---|---|---|---|---|---|---|---|---|---|---|---|---|
| Carmen Anderson (NFI) | 2 | 2 | 2 | 5 | 5 | 8 | 9 | 9 | 12 | 14 | 15 | 17 | 17 | 19 | 20 | 21 | 21 |
| Nayanmoni Saikia (IND) | 0 | 1 | 2 | 2 | 4 | 4 | 4 | 5 | 5 | 5 | 5 | 5 | 6 | 6 | 6 | 6 | 6 |
Report

25 July, 18:45
| Name | 1 | 2 | 3 | 4 | 5 | 6 | 7 | 8 | 9 | 10 | 11 | 12 | 13 | 14 | 15 | 16 | 17 | 18 | 19 | 20 | 21 | 22 | 23 | 24 | 25 | Final |
|---|---|---|---|---|---|---|---|---|---|---|---|---|---|---|---|---|---|---|---|---|---|---|---|---|---|---|
| Jo Edwards (NZL) | 2 | 3 | 5 | 5 | 6 | 7 | 8 | 9 | 11 | 11 | 11 | 14 | 14 | 14 | 14 | 15 | 16 | 16 | 17 | 18 | 18 | 18 | 19 | 19 | 21 | 21 |
| Siti Zalina Ahmad (MAS) | 0 | 0 | 0 | 2 | 2 | 2 | 2 | 2 | 2 | 4 | 6 | 6 | 7 | 9 | 10 | 10 | 10 | 12 | 12 | 12 | 13 | 14 | 14 | 17 | 17 | 17 |
Report

25 July, 18:45
| Name | 1 | 2 | 3 | 4 | 5 | 6 | 7 | 8 | 9 | 10 | 11 | 12 | 13 | 14 | Final |
|---|---|---|---|---|---|---|---|---|---|---|---|---|---|---|---|
| Hina Rereiti (NIU) | 0 | 4 | 4 | 5 | 5 | 7 | 9 | 9 | 10 | 10 | 10 | 10 | 10 | 10 | 10 |
| Nayanmoni Saikia (IND) | 3 | 3 | 4 | 4 | 8 | 8 | 8 | 9 | 9 | 12 | 14 | 16 | 20 | 21 | 21 |
Report

26 July, 08:45
| Name | 1 | 2 | 3 | 4 | 5 | 6 | 7 | 8 | 9 | 10 | 11 | 12 | 13 | 14 | 15 | 16 | 17 | 18 | 19 | 20 | Final |
|---|---|---|---|---|---|---|---|---|---|---|---|---|---|---|---|---|---|---|---|---|---|
| Jo Edwards (NZL) | 1 | 1 | 4 | 6 | 9 | 9 | 10 | 10 | 12 | 12 | 13 | 14 | 14 | 15 | 15 | 17 | 17 | 19 | 19 | 21 | 21 |
| Carmen Anderson (NFI) | 0 | 3 | 3 | 3 | 3 | 4 | 4 | 6 | 6 | 7 | 7 | 7 | 11 | 11 | 14 | 14 | 15 | 15 | 16 | 16 | 16 |
Report

26 July, 08:45
| Name | 1 | 2 | 3 | 4 | 5 | 6 | 7 | 8 | 9 | 10 | Final |
|---|---|---|---|---|---|---|---|---|---|---|---|
| Siti Zalina Ahmad (MAS) | 2 | 3 | 6 | 8 | 8 | 10 | 12 | 16 | 18 | 21 | 21 |
| Hina Rereiti (NIU) | 0 | 0 | 0 | 0 | 2 | 2 | 2 | 2 | 2 | 2 | 2 |
Report

=== Section C ===
| Rank | Name | MP | MW | MT | ML | For | Ag | PD | Pts |
|---|---|---|---|---|---|---|---|---|---|
| 1 | Catherine McMillen (NIR) | 5 | 4 | 0 | 1 | 96 | 72 | +24 | 12 |
| 2 | Natalie Melmore (ENG) | 5 | 4 | 0 | 1 | 96 | 72 | +24 | 12 |
| 3 | Lindsey Greechan (JER) | 5 | 4 | 0 | 1 | 94 | 76 | +18 | 12 |
| 4 | Mirriam Nyokabi Ndungu (KEN) | 5 | 2 | 0 | 3 | 79 | 79 | 0 | 6 |
| 5 | Carmela Spiteri (MLT) | 5 | 1 | 0 | 4 | 66 | 96 | -30 | 3 |
| 6 | Alofa Adam (SAM) | 5 | 0 | 0 | 5 | 69 | 105 | -36 | 0 |

24 July, 11:45
| Name | 1 | 2 | 3 | 4 | 5 | 6 | 7 | 8 | 9 | 10 | 11 | 12 | 13 | 14 | 15 | 16 | 17 | 18 | Final |
|---|---|---|---|---|---|---|---|---|---|---|---|---|---|---|---|---|---|---|---|
| Natalie Melmore (ENG) | 2 | 3 | 4 | 5 | 6 | 8 | 9 | 12 | 15 | 15 | 18 | 18 | 18 | 18 | 19 | 19 | 19 | 21 | 21 |
| Carmela Spiteri (MLT) | 0 | 0 | 0 | 0 | 0 | 0 | 0 | 0 | 0 | 1 | 1 | 2 | 3 | 5 | 5 | 6 | 7 | 7 | 7 |
Report

24 July, 11:45
| Name | 1 | 2 | 3 | 4 | 5 | 6 | 7 | 8 | 9 | 10 | 11 | 12 | 13 | 14 | 15 | 16 | 17 | Final |
|---|---|---|---|---|---|---|---|---|---|---|---|---|---|---|---|---|---|---|
| Catherine McMillen (NIR) | 0 | 2 | 5 | 7 | 7 | 7 | 8 | 8 | 10 | 10 | 10 | 10 | 12 | 14 | 16 | 19 | 21 | 21 |
| Mirriam Nyokabi Ndungu (KEN) | 1 | 1 | 1 | 1 | 2 | 3 | 3 | 5 | 5 | 6 | 9 | 10 | 10 | 10 | 10 | 10 | 10 | 10 |
Report

24 July, 11:45
| Name | 1 | 2 | 3 | 4 | 5 | 6 | 7 | 8 | 9 | 10 | 11 | 12 | 13 | 14 | 15 | 16 | 17 | 18 | 19 | Final |
|---|---|---|---|---|---|---|---|---|---|---|---|---|---|---|---|---|---|---|---|---|
| Lindsey Greechan (JER) | 0 | 3 | 3 | 5 | 6 | 8 | 9 | 9 | 9 | 11 | 11 | 12 | 13 | 14 | 14 | 17 | 17 | 19 | 21 | 21 |
| Alofa Adam (SAM) | 2 | 2 | 3 | 3 | 3 | 3 | 3 | 5 | 6 | 6 | 8 | 8 | 8 | 8 | 9 | 9 | 10 | 10 | 10 | 10 |
Report

24 July, 18:45
| Name | 1 | 2 | 3 | 4 | 5 | 6 | 7 | 8 | 9 | 10 | 11 | 12 | 13 | 14 | 15 | 16 | 17 | 18 | 19 | 20 | 21 | 22 | Final |
|---|---|---|---|---|---|---|---|---|---|---|---|---|---|---|---|---|---|---|---|---|---|---|---|
| Natalie Melmore (ENG) | 0 | 0 | 0 | 2 | 4 | 6 | 9 | 9 | 9 | 11 | 11 | 11 | 14 | 14 | 14 | 14 | 15 | 16 | 17 | 17 | 17 | 21 | 21 |
| Alofa Adam (SAM) | 2 | 4 | 6 | 6 | 6 | 6 | 6 | 8 | 10 | 10 | 11 | 14 | 14 | 17 | 18 | 18 | 18 | 18 | 19 | 19 | 20 | 20 | 20 |
Report

24 July, 18:45
| Name | 1 | 2 | 3 | 4 | 5 | 6 | 7 | 8 | 9 | 10 | 11 | 12 | 13 | 14 | 15 | 16 | 17 | 18 | 19 | 20 | 21 | 22 | Final |
|---|---|---|---|---|---|---|---|---|---|---|---|---|---|---|---|---|---|---|---|---|---|---|---|
| Catherine McMillen (NIR) | 0 | 2 | 2 | 2 | 2 | 3 | 4 | 4 | 4 | 5 | 5 | 7 | 8 | 8 | 8 | 8 | 9 | 9 | 10 | 11 | 12 | 12 | 12 |
| Lindsey Greechan (JER) | 1 | 1 | 2 | 4 | 7 | 7 | 7 | 8 | 9 | 9 | 11 | 11 | 11 | 13 | 14 | 15 | 15 | 17 | 17 | 17 | 17 | 21 | 21 |
Report

24 July, 18:45
| Name | 1 | 2 | 3 | 4 | 5 | 6 | 7 | 8 | 9 | 10 | 11 | 12 | 13 | 14 | Final |
|---|---|---|---|---|---|---|---|---|---|---|---|---|---|---|---|
| Mirriam Nyokabi Ndungu (KEN) | 1 | 2 | 2 | 2 | 5 | 8 | 11 | 11 | 14 | 16 | 17 | 19 | 20 | 21 | 21 |
| Carmela Spiteri (MLT) | 0 | 0 | 1 | 2 | 2 | 2 | 2 | 3 | 3 | 3 | 3 | 3 | 3 | 3 | 3 |
Report

25 July, 11:45
| Name | 1 | 2 | 3 | 4 | 5 | 6 | 7 | 8 | 9 | 10 | 11 | 12 | 13 | 14 | 15 | 16 | 17 | 18 | 19 | 20 | 21 | 22 | Final |
|---|---|---|---|---|---|---|---|---|---|---|---|---|---|---|---|---|---|---|---|---|---|---|---|
| Natalie Melmore (ENG) | 0 | 0 | 0 | 1 | 3 | 6 | 6 | 6 | 6 | 7 | 9 | 10 | 12 | 12 | 15 | 15 | 18 | 19 | 19 | 20 | 20 | 21 | 21 |
| Mirriam Nyokabi Ndungu (KEN) | 1 | 2 | 3 | 3 | 3 | 3 | 4 | 6 | 7 | 7 | 7 | 7 | 7 | 9 | 9 | 11 | 11 | 11 | 12 | 12 | 14 | 14 | 14 |
Report

25 July, 11:45
| Name | 1 | 2 | 3 | 4 | 5 | 6 | 7 | 8 | 9 | 10 | 11 | 12 | 13 | 14 | 15 | 16 | 17 | 18 | 19 | 20 | Final |
|---|---|---|---|---|---|---|---|---|---|---|---|---|---|---|---|---|---|---|---|---|---|
| Catherine McMillen (NIR) | 0 | 0 | 1 | 1 | 1 | 2 | 2 | 2 | 6 | 6 | 6 | 6 | 8 | 10 | 12 | 15 | 15 | 19 | 20 | 21 | 21 |
| Alofa Adam (SAM) | 1 | 2 | 2 | 5 | 6 | 6 | 7 | 9 | 9 | 10 | 11 | 12 | 12 | 12 | 12 | 12 | 14 | 14 | 14 | 14 | 14 |
Report

25 July, 11:45
| Name | 1 | 2 | 3 | 4 | 5 | 6 | 7 | 8 | 9 | 10 | 11 | 12 | 13 | 14 | 15 | 16 | 17 | 18 | 19 | 20 | 21 | 22 | 23 | Final |
|---|---|---|---|---|---|---|---|---|---|---|---|---|---|---|---|---|---|---|---|---|---|---|---|---|
| Lindsey Greechan (JER) | 2 | 2 | 2 | 2 | 2 | 3 | 3 | 6 | 6 | 6 | 6 | 7 | 8 | 8 | 11 | 12 | 14 | 14 | 18 | 18 | 18 | 20 | 21 | 21 |
| Carmela Spiteri (MLT) | 0 | 2 | 3 | 6 | 9 | 9 | 11 | 11 | 12 | 13 | 14 | 14 | 14 | 16 | 16 | 16 | 16 | 18 | 18 | 19 | 20 | 20 | 20 | 20 |
Report

25 July, 18:45
| Name | 1 | 2 | 3 | 4 | 5 | 6 | 7 | 8 | 9 | 10 | 11 | 12 | 13 | 14 | 15 | 16 | 17 | Final |
|---|---|---|---|---|---|---|---|---|---|---|---|---|---|---|---|---|---|---|
| Natalie Melmore (ENG) | 0 | 2 | 5 | 5 | 6 | 10 | 10 | 11 | 11 | 13 | 13 | 16 | 16 | 16 | 18 | 19 | 21 | 21 |
| Lindsey Greechan (JER) | 1 | 1 | 1 | 3 | 3 | 3 | 5 | 5 | 7 | 7 | 8 | 8 | 9 | 10 | 10 | 10 | 10 | 10 |
Report

25 July, 18:45
| Name | 1 | 2 | 3 | 4 | 5 | 6 | 7 | 8 | 9 | 10 | 11 | 12 | 13 | 14 | 15 | 16 | 17 | 18 | 19 | Final |
|---|---|---|---|---|---|---|---|---|---|---|---|---|---|---|---|---|---|---|---|---|
| Catherine McMillen (NIR) | 0 | 0 | 0 | 0 | 2 | 5 | 7 | 8 | 11 | 13 | 13 | 13 | 14 | 14 | 14 | 15 | 18 | 18 | 21 | 21 |
| Carmela Spiteri (MLT) | 1 | 3 | 4 | 6 | 6 | 6 | 6 | 6 | 6 | 6 | 9 | 10 | 10 | 11 | 13 | 13 | 13 | 15 | 15 | 15 |
Report

25 July, 18:45
| Name | 1 | 2 | 3 | 4 | 5 | 6 | 7 | 8 | 9 | 10 | 11 | 12 | 13 | 14 | 15 | 16 | 17 | 18 | 19 | 20 | 21 | Final |
|---|---|---|---|---|---|---|---|---|---|---|---|---|---|---|---|---|---|---|---|---|---|---|
| Mirriam Nyokabi Ndungu (KEN) | 1 | 2 | 2 | 2 | 3 | 5 | 7 | 9 | 9 | 10 | 11 | 11 | 11 | 12 | 14 | 16 | 16 | 17 | 18 | 19 | 21 | 21 |
| Alofa Adam (SAM) | 0 | 0 | 2 | 5 | 5 | 5 | 5 | 5 | 8 | 8 | 8 | 9 | 12 | 12 | 12 | 12 | 13 | 13 | 13 | 13 | 13 | 13 |
Report

26 July, 08:45
| Name | 1 | 2 | 3 | 4 | 5 | 6 | 7 | 8 | 9 | 10 | 11 | 12 | 13 | 14 | 15 | 16 | 17 | 18 | Final |
|---|---|---|---|---|---|---|---|---|---|---|---|---|---|---|---|---|---|---|---|
| Natalie Melmore (ENG) | 0 | 4 | 4 | 4 | 4 | 5 | 7 | 7 | 8 | 8 | 8 | 8 | 10 | 10 | 10 | 10 | 12 | 12 | 12 |
| Catherine McMillen (NIR) | 2 | 2 | 3 | 4 | 5 | 5 | 5 | 6 | 6 | 7 | 10 | 13 | 13 | 15 | 16 | 17 | 17 | 21 | 21 |
Report

26 July, 08:45
| Name | 1 | 2 | 3 | 4 | 5 | 6 | 7 | 8 | 9 | 10 | 11 | 12 | 13 | 14 | 15 | 16 | 17 | 18 | 19 | 20 | 21 | 22 | Final |
|---|---|---|---|---|---|---|---|---|---|---|---|---|---|---|---|---|---|---|---|---|---|---|---|
| Lindsey Greechan (JER) | 2 | 3 | 5 | 6 | 6 | 6 | 7 | 8 | 10 | 10 | 10 | 10 | 10 | 12 | 12 | 13 | 15 | 16 | 17 | 20 | 20 | 21 | 21 |
| Mirriam Nyokabi Ndungu (KEN) | 0 | 0 | 0 | 0 | 2 | 3 | 3 | 3 | 3 | 4 | 7 | 9 | 11 | 11 | 12 | 12 | 12 | 12 | 12 | 12 | 13 | 13 | 13 |
Report

26 July, 08:45
| Name | 1 | 2 | 3 | 4 | 5 | 6 | 7 | 8 | 9 | 10 | 11 | 12 | 13 | 14 | 15 | 16 | 17 | 18 | 19 | 20 | 21 | 22 | 23 | Final |
|---|---|---|---|---|---|---|---|---|---|---|---|---|---|---|---|---|---|---|---|---|---|---|---|---|
| Carmela Spiteri (MLT) | 0 | 0 | 0 | 2 | 2 | 3 | 3 | 3 | 7 | 8 | 8 | 10 | 10 | 12 | 12 | 13 | 13 | 17 | 18 | 19 | 20 | 20 | 21 | 21 |
| Alofa Adam (SAM) | 1 | 2 | 3 | 3 | 4 | 4 | 6 | 7 | 7 | 7 | 8 | 8 | 9 | 9 | 10 | 10 | 11 | 11 | 11 | 11 | 11 | 12 | 12 | 12 |
Report

=== Section D ===
| Rank | Name | MP | MW | MT | ML | For | Ag | PD | Pts |
|---|---|---|---|---|---|---|---|---|---|
| 1 | Colleen Piketh (RSA) | 4 | 3 | 0 | 1 | 76 | 59 | +17 | 9 |
| 2 | Teokotai Jim (COK) | 4 | 3 | 0 | 1 | 76 | 62 | +14 | 9 |
| 3 | Kelly McKerihen (CAN) | 4 | 2 | 0 | 2 | 80 | 69 | +11 | 6 |
| 4 | Catherine Wimp (PNG) | 4 | 2 | 0 | 2 | 68 | 69 | -1 | 6 |
| 5 | Elizabeth Moceiwai (FIJ) | 4 | 0 | 0 | 4 | 43 | 84 | -41 | 0 |

24 July, 11:45
| Name | 1 | 2 | 3 | 4 | 5 | 6 | 7 | 8 | 9 | 10 | 11 | 12 | 13 | 14 | 15 | 16 | 17 | 18 | 19 | 20 | 21 | 22 | 23 | 24 | 25 | 26 | 27 | 28 | Final |
|---|---|---|---|---|---|---|---|---|---|---|---|---|---|---|---|---|---|---|---|---|---|---|---|---|---|---|---|---|---|
| Kelly McKerihen (CAN) | 2 | 2 | 3 | 3 | 4 | 5 | 5 | 5 | 5 | 5 | 5 | 7 | 7 | 7 | 7 | 7 | 7 | 8 | 9 | 9 | 10 | 11 | 13 | 13 | 16 | 19 | 20 | 20 | 20 |
| Teokotai Jim (COK) | 0 | 1 | 1 | 3 | 3 | 3 | 6 | 7 | 9 | 10 | 11 | 11 | 13 | 14 | 15 | 16 | 17 | 17 | 17 | 18 | 18 | 18 | 18 | 20 | 20 | 20 | 20 | 21 | 21 |
Report

24 July, 11:45
| Name | 1 | 2 | 3 | 4 | 5 | 6 | 7 | 8 | 9 | 10 | 11 | 12 | 13 | 14 | 15 | 16 | 17 | 18 | 19 | Final |
|---|---|---|---|---|---|---|---|---|---|---|---|---|---|---|---|---|---|---|---|---|
| Elizabeth Moceiwai (FIJ) | 0 | 0 | 0 | 0 | 1 | 5 | 5 | 5 | 5 | 5 | 5 | 5 | 6 | 6 | 8 | 8 | 9 | 9 | 9 | 9 |
| Catherine Wimp (PNG) | 2 | 5 | 6 | 7 | 7 | 7 | 8 | 9 | 12 | 13 | 14 | 15 | 15 | 16 | 16 | 17 | 17 | 18 | 21 | 21 |
Report

24 July, 18:45
| Name | 1 | 2 | 3 | 4 | 5 | 6 | 7 | 8 | 9 | 10 | 11 | 12 | 13 | 14 | 15 | 16 | 17 | 18 | 19 | 20 | 21 | 22 | 23 | Final |
|---|---|---|---|---|---|---|---|---|---|---|---|---|---|---|---|---|---|---|---|---|---|---|---|---|
| Kelly McKerihen (CAN) | 2 | 3 | 6 | 7 | 7 | 8 | 8 | 9 | 10 | 10 | 10 | 10 | 12 | 14 | 14 | 14 | 16 | 16 | 17 | 17 | 17 | 18 | 18 | 18 |
| Catherine Wimp (PNG) | 0 | 0 | 0 | 0 | 4 | 4 | 5 | 5 | 5 | 6 | 8 | 9 | 9 | 9 | 11 | 12 | 12 | 14 | 14 | 17 | 18 | 18 | 21 | 21 |
Report

24 July, 18:45
| Name | 1 | 2 | 3 | 4 | 5 | 6 | 7 | 8 | 9 | 10 | 11 | 12 | Final |
|---|---|---|---|---|---|---|---|---|---|---|---|---|---|
| Colleen Piketh (RSA) | 1 | 4 | 5 | 9 | 13 | 13 | 15 | 15 | 17 | 18 | 18 | 21 | 21 |
| Elizabeth Moceiwai (FIJ) | 0 | 0 | 0 | 0 | 0 | 3 | 3 | 4 | 4 | 4 | 8 | 8 | 8 |
Report

25 July, 11:45
| Name | 1 | 2 | 3 | 4 | 5 | 6 | 7 | 8 | 9 | 10 | 11 | 12 | 13 | 14 | 15 | 16 | 17 | 18 | 19 | 20 | 21 | 22 | 23 | 24 | 25 | Final |
|---|---|---|---|---|---|---|---|---|---|---|---|---|---|---|---|---|---|---|---|---|---|---|---|---|---|---|
| Colleen Piketh (RSA) | 0 | 2 | 4 | 5 | 5 | 5 | 6 | 7 | 9 | 9 | 11 | 11 | 11 | 11 | 12 | 12 | 14 | 16 | 16 | 17 | 17 | 18 | 19 | 19 | 21 | 21 |
| Catherine Wimp (PNG) | 1 | 1 | 1 | 1 | 3 | 4 | 4 | 4 | 4 | 5 | 5 | 6 | 8 | 9 | 9 | 11 | 11 | 11 | 13 | 13 | 15 | 15 | 15 | 17 | 17 | 17 |
Report

25 July, 11:45
| Name | 1 | 2 | 3 | 4 | 5 | 6 | 7 | 8 | 9 | 10 | 11 | 12 | 13 | 14 | 15 | 16 | 17 | 18 | 19 | 20 | Final |
|---|---|---|---|---|---|---|---|---|---|---|---|---|---|---|---|---|---|---|---|---|---|
| Elizabeth Moceiwai (FIJ) | 4 | 4 | 6 | 6 | 6 | 7 | 8 | 8 | 9 | 9 | 10 | 10 | 10 | 12 | 12 | 12 | 12 | 12 | 12 | 12 | 12 |
| Teokotai Jim (COK) | 0 | 1 | 1 | 2 | 4 | 4 | 4 | 6 | 6 | 8 | 8 | 9 | 10 | 10 | 12 | 16 | 17 | 18 | 19 | 21 | 21 |
Report

25 July, 18:45
| Name | 1 | 2 | 3 | 4 | 5 | 6 | 7 | 8 | 9 | 10 | 11 | 12 | 13 | 14 | 15 | 16 | 17 | 18 | 19 | Final |
|---|---|---|---|---|---|---|---|---|---|---|---|---|---|---|---|---|---|---|---|---|
| Kelly McKerihen (CAN) | 0 | 0 | 2 | 3 | 3 | 4 | 4 | 5 | 5 | 6 | 9 | 11 | 11 | 14 | 17 | 17 | 20 | 20 | 21 | 21 |
| Elizabeth Moceiwai (FIJ) | 3 | 5 | 5 | 5 | 7 | 7 | 8 | 8 | 9 | 9 | 9 | 9 | 12 | 12 | 12 | 13 | 13 | 14 | 14 | 14 |
Report

25 July, 18:45
| Name | 1 | 2 | 3 | 4 | 5 | 6 | 7 | 8 | 9 | 10 | 11 | 12 | 13 | 14 | 15 | 16 | 17 | 18 | Final |
|---|---|---|---|---|---|---|---|---|---|---|---|---|---|---|---|---|---|---|---|
| Colleen Piketh (RSA) | 0 | 0 | 2 | 3 | 5 | 8 | 8 | 10 | 10 | 13 | 13 | 16 | 17 | 17 | 17 | 17 | 19 | 21 | 21 |
| Teokotai Jim (COK) | 1 | 2 | 2 | 2 | 2 | 2 | 3 | 3 | 5 | 5 | 6 | 6 | 6 | 9 | 12 | 13 | 13 | 13 | 13 |
Report

26 July, 08:45
| Name | 1 | 2 | 3 | 4 | 5 | 6 | 7 | 8 | 9 | 10 | 11 | 12 | 13 | 14 | 15 | 16 | 17 | 18 | 19 | 20 | Final |
|---|---|---|---|---|---|---|---|---|---|---|---|---|---|---|---|---|---|---|---|---|---|
| Kelly McKerihen (CAN) | 0 | 3 | 3 | 4 | 5 | 7 | 8 | 8 | 8 | 9 | 11 | 11 | 13 | 13 | 17 | 17 | 18 | 18 | 18 | 21 | 21 |
| Colleen Piketh (RSA) | 1 | 1 | 2 | 2 | 2 | 2 | 2 | 4 | 5 | 5 | 5 | 6 | 6 | 7 | 7 | 9 | 9 | 11 | 13 | 13 | 13 |
Report

26 July, 08:45
| Name | 1 | 2 | 3 | 4 | 5 | 6 | 7 | 8 | 9 | 10 | 11 | 12 | 13 | 14 | 15 | 16 | 17 | 18 | 19 | 20 | 21 | 22 | Final |
|---|---|---|---|---|---|---|---|---|---|---|---|---|---|---|---|---|---|---|---|---|---|---|---|
| Teokotai Jim (COK) | 0 | 1 | 1 | 1 | 2 | 4 | 5 | 6 | 7 | 7 | 8 | 8 | 11 | 12 | 12 | 14 | 14 | 16 | 16 | 18 | 20 | 21 | 21 |
| Catherine Wimp (PNG) | 1 | 1 | 2 | 3 | 3 | 3 | 3 | 3 | 3 | 4 | 4 | 5 | 5 | 5 | 7 | 7 | 8 | 8 | 9 | 9 | 9 | 9 | 9 |
Report

== Knockout stage ==
Quarterfinal
A1 | Caroline Brown (SCO) | 20
C1 | Natalie Melmore (ENG) | 21
D1 | Colleen Piketh (RSA) | 21
D2 | Teokotai Jim (COK) | 20
B1 | Jo Edwards (NZL) | 21
B2 | Carmen Anderson (NFI) | 17
C2 | Catherine McMillen (NIR) | 21
A2 | Caroline Taylor (WAL) | 13

Semifinal
C1 | Natalie Melmore (ENG) | 21
D1 | Colleen Piketh (RSA) | 18
B1 | Jo Edwards (NZL) | 21
C2 | Catherine McMillen (NIR) | 8

Finals
C1 | Natalie Melmore (ENG) | 15
B1 | Jo Edwards (NZL) | 21
Third place
D1 | Colleen Piketh (RSA) | 21
C2 | Catherine McMillen (NIR) | 10

=== Quarterfinals ===
26 July, 16:45
| Name | 1 | 2 | 3 | 4 | 5 | 6 | 7 | 8 | 9 | 10 | 11 | 12 | 13 | 14 | 15 | 16 | 17 | 18 | 19 | 20 | 21 | 22 | 23 | 24 | 25 | 26 | 27 | 28 | Final |
|---|---|---|---|---|---|---|---|---|---|---|---|---|---|---|---|---|---|---|---|---|---|---|---|---|---|---|---|---|---|
| Caroline Brown (SCO) | 2 | 3 | 3 | 3 | 4 | 5 | 5 | 5 | 5 | 8 | 8 | 8 | 8 | 9 | 9 | 12 | 13 | 13 | 13 | 14 | 16 | 18 | 19 | 19 | 19 | 20 | 20 | 20 | 20 |
| Natalie Melmore (ENG) | 0 | 0 | 1 | 3 | 3 | 3 | 6 | 7 | 9 | 9 | 10 | 11 | 12 | 12 | 14 | 14 | 14 | 15 | 17 | 17 | 17 | 17 | 17 | 18 | 19 | 19 | 20 | 21 | 21 |
Report

26 July, 16:45
| Name | 1 | 2 | 3 | 4 | 5 | 6 | 7 | 8 | 9 | 10 | 11 | 12 | 13 | 14 | 15 | 16 | 17 | 18 | 19 | 20 | 21 | 22 | 23 | 24 | 25 | 26 | 27 | Final |
|---|---|---|---|---|---|---|---|---|---|---|---|---|---|---|---|---|---|---|---|---|---|---|---|---|---|---|---|---|
| Jo Edwards (NZL) | 0 | 0 | 2 | 2 | 3 | 3 | 3 | 4 | 5 | 5 | 6 | 7 | 10 | 10 | 11 | 12 | 12 | 12 | 15 | 16 | 17 | 19 | 19 | 20 | 20 | 20 | 21 | 21 |
| Carmen Anderson (NFI) | 1 | 2 | 2 | 3 | 3 | 4 | 7 | 7 | 7 | 8 | 8 | 8 | 8 | 9 | 9 | 9 | 10 | 11 | 11 | 11 | 11 | 11 | 13 | 13 | 16 | 17 | 17 | 17 |
Report

26 July, 16:45
| Name | 1 | 2 | 3 | 4 | 5 | 6 | 7 | 8 | 9 | 10 | 11 | 12 | 13 | 14 | 15 | 16 | 17 | 18 | 19 | 20 | 21 | 22 | 23 | 24 | Final |
|---|---|---|---|---|---|---|---|---|---|---|---|---|---|---|---|---|---|---|---|---|---|---|---|---|---|
| Catherine McMillen (NIR) | 2 | 2 | 3 | 4 | 4 | 4 | 5 | 5 | 6 | 7 | 9 | 9 | 10 | 10 | 10 | 12 | 12 | 13 | 14 | 16 | 16 | 17 | 19 | 21 | 21 |
| Caroline Taylor (WAL) | 0 | 1 | 1 | 1 | 3 | 4 | 4 | 5 | 5 | 5 | 5 | 6 | 6 | 9 | 10 | 10 | 12 | 12 | 12 | 12 | 13 | 13 | 13 | 13 | 13 |
Report

26 July, 16:45
| Name | 1 | 2 | 3 | 4 | 5 | 6 | 7 | 8 | 9 | 10 | 11 | 12 | 13 | 14 | 15 | 16 | 17 | 18 | 19 | 20 | 21 | 22 | 23 | 24 | 25 | Final |
|---|---|---|---|---|---|---|---|---|---|---|---|---|---|---|---|---|---|---|---|---|---|---|---|---|---|---|
| Colleen Piketh (RSA) | 0 | 2 | 2 | 5 | 8 | 8 | 9 | 10 | 11 | 11 | 14 | 14 | 15 | 15 | 15 | 15 | 16 | 16 | 17 | 17 | 18 | 18 | 19 | 19 | 21 | 21 |
| Teokotai Jim (COK) | 2 | 2 | 5 | 5 | 5 | 9 | 9 | 9 | 9 | 10 | 10 | 11 | 11 | 12 | 13 | 14 | 14 | 15 | 15 | 17 | 17 | 19 | 19 | 20 | 20 | 20 |
Report

=== Semifinals ===
27 July, 08:45
| Name | 1 | 2 | 3 | 4 | 5 | 6 | 7 | 8 | 9 | 10 | 11 | 12 | 13 | 14 | 15 | 16 | 17 | 18 | 19 | 20 | 21 | 22 | 23 | 24 | 25 | 26 | Final |
|---|---|---|---|---|---|---|---|---|---|---|---|---|---|---|---|---|---|---|---|---|---|---|---|---|---|---|---|
| Natalie Melmore (ENG) | 0 | 1 | 3 | 3 | 4 | 4 | 5 | 5 | 5 | 5 | 6 | 6 | 6 | 8 | 10 | 11 | 12 | 13 | 13 | 14 | 14 | 16 | 16 | 17 | 19 | 21 | 21 |
| Colleen Piketh (RSA) | 1 | 1 | 1 | 2 | 2 | 3 | 3 | 7 | 8 | 9 | 9 | 12 | 13 | 13 | 13 | 13 | 13 | 13 | 14 | 14 | 17 | 17 | 18 | 18 | 18 | 18 | 18 |
Report

27 July, 08:45
| Name | 1 | 2 | 3 | 4 | 5 | 6 | 7 | 8 | 9 | 10 | 11 | 12 | 13 | 14 | Final |
|---|---|---|---|---|---|---|---|---|---|---|---|---|---|---|---|
| Jo Edwards (NZL) | 0 | 1 | 4 | 6 | 9 | 12 | 12 | 12 | 14 | 17 | 17 | 17 | 18 | 21 | 21 |
| Catherine McMillen (NIR) | 1 | 1 | 1 | 1 | 1 | 1 | 2 | 3 | 3 | 3 | 6 | 8 | 8 | 8 | 8 |
Report

=== Finals ===
==== Gold medal ====
27 July, 17:30
| Rank | Name | 1 | 2 | 3 | 4 | 5 | 6 | 7 | 8 | 9 | 10 | 11 | 12 | 13 | 14 | 15 | 16 | 17 | 18 | 19 | 20 | 21 | 22 | 23 | 24 | Final |
|---|---|---|---|---|---|---|---|---|---|---|---|---|---|---|---|---|---|---|---|---|---|---|---|---|---|---|
| 2nd place, silver medalist(s) | Natalie Melmore (ENG) | 0 | 0 | 0 | 1 | 1 | 1 | 1 | 1 | 2 | 2 | 2 | 3 | 4 | 4 | 6 | 6 | 7 | 9 | 10 | 12 | 12 | 13 | 15 | 15 | 15 |
| 1st place, gold medalist(s) | Jo Edwards (NZL) | 1 | 3 | 7 | 7 | 9 | 11 | 12 | 13 | 13 | 14 | 15 | 15 | 15 | 17 | 17 | 18 | 18 | 18 | 18 | 18 | 20 | 20 | 20 | 21 | 21 |
Report

==== Bronze medal ====
27 July, 17:30
| Rank | Name | 1 | 2 | 3 | 4 | 5 | 6 | 7 | 8 | 9 | 10 | 11 | 12 | 13 | 14 | 15 | 16 | 17 | Final |
|---|---|---|---|---|---|---|---|---|---|---|---|---|---|---|---|---|---|---|---|
| 3rd place, bronze medalist(s) | Colleen Piketh (RSA) | 1 | 2 | 2 | 2 | 2 | 3 | 3 | 4 | 6 | 8 | 9 | 11 | 14 | 14 | 18 | 18 | 21 | 21 |
| 4 | Catherine McMillen (NIR) | 0 | 0 | 2 | 4 | 6 | 6 | 7 | 7 | 7 | 7 | 7 | 7 | 7 | 8 | 8 | 10 | 10 | 10 |
Report
