= Catherine Beattie (bowls) =

Northern Irish bowls player

Personal information
- Nationality: British (Northern Irish)
- Born: 11 July 1981 (age 44) Armagh, Northern Ireland

Sport
- Sport: Lawn & indoor bowls
- Club: County Antrim (indoors); Larne BC (outdoors)
Medal record
Representing combined Ireland
Atlantic Bowls Championships
Gold medal – first place	2011 Paphos	singles
Gold medal – first place	2015 Paphos	singles
European Championships
Silver medal – second place	2017 Jersey	pairs
Silver medal – second place	2017 Jersey	mixed four
Gold medal – first place	2017 Jersey	team

Catherine Beattie (née Catherine McMillen, born 1981) is a Northern Irish international lawn & indoor bowler.

== Bowls career ==
Beattie represented a combined Ireland under her maiden name of Catherine McMillen and won the singles gold medal at the Atlantic Bowls Championships. She also represented Northern Ireland during the 2014 Commonwealth Games before she was married. McMillen lost in the bronze medal play off in the singles at the 2014 Commonwealth Games to Colleen Piketh. In 2015 she won the singles gold medal at the Atlantic Bowls Championships.

In 2017, she won three medals at the European Bowls Championships and one year later was selected as part of the Northern Ireland team for the 2018 Commonwealth Games on the Gold Coast in Queensland.

In 2020, she was selected for the 2020 World Outdoor Bowls Championship in Australia.
