= Lawn bowls at the 2014 Commonwealth Games – Open para-sport triples =

Lawn bowls – Open para-sport triples at the 2014 Commonwealth Games
- Venue: Kelvingrove Lawn Bowls Centre
- Dates: 28–31 July 2014
- Competitors: 21 from 7 nations

Medalists
gold medal	Deon van de Vyver; Derrick Lobban; Roger Hagerty	South Africa
silver medal	Barry Wynks; Lynda Bennett; Mark Noble	New Zealand
bronze medal	Bob Love; David Fisher; Paul Brown	England

The open para-sport triples at the 2014 Commonwealth Games, was part of the lawn bowls category, which took place between 28 and 31 July 2014 at the Kelvingrove Lawn Bowls Centre. South Africa won the gold medal, defeating New Zealand in the final. England won the bronze medal.

== Sectional play ==
=== Section A ===
Rank	Team	MP	MW	MT	ML	For	Ag	PD	Pts
1	South Africa	2	1	1	0	31	19	+12	4
2	New Zealand	2	1	1	0	21	18	+3	4
3	Australia	2	0	0	2	17	32	-15	0

28 July, 08:45
Team	1	2	3	4	5	6	7	8	9	10	11	12	13	14	15	Final
New Zealand	0	0	0	1	1	2	4	4	6	6	7	8	10	11	11	11
Australia	1	2	3	3	4	4	4	5	5	7	7	7	7	7	8	8
Report

29 July, 08:45
Team	1	2	3	4	5	6	7	8	9	10	11	12	13	14	15	Final
South Africa	3	5	6	9	10	11	12	12	13	13	17	17	17	21	21	21
Australia	0	0	0	0	0	0	0	3	3	4	4	6	8	8	9	9
Report

29 July, 15:45
Team	1	2	3	4	5	6	7	8	9	10	11	12	13	14	15	Final
South Africa	2	2	3	4	4	5	6	7	7	8	8	8	8	10	10	10
New Zealand	0	1	1	1	4	4	4	4	5	5	6	8	9	9	10	10
Report

=== Section B ===
Rank	Team	MP	MW	MT	ML	For	Ag	PD	Pts
1	Scotland	3	3	0	0	63	28	35	9
2	England	3	2	0	1	47	41	+6	6
3	Wales	3	1	0	2	33	44	-11	3
4	Malaysia	3	0	0	3	29	59	-30	0

28 July, 08:45
Team	1	2	3	4	5	6	7	8	9	10	11	12	13	14	15	Final
Scotland	4	5	6	6	6	8	12	13	17	21	23	24	25	25	25	25
Malaysia	0	0	0	1	3	3	3	3	3	3	3	3	3	5	6	6
Report

28 July, 08:45
Team	1	2	3	4	5	6	7	8	9	10	11	12	13	14	15	Final
England	2	3	4	5	5	5	5	5	6	6	7	8	12	12	14	14
Wales	0	0	0	0	1	5	7	8	8	9	9	9	9	10	10	10
Report

29 July, 08:45
Team	1	2	3	4	5	6	7	8	9	10	11	12	13	14	15	Final
Scotland	0	2	3	3	3	5	5	6	8	6	7	8	12	12	14	14
Wales	0	0	0	0	1	5	7	8	8	9	9	9	9	10	10	10
Report

29 July, 08:45
Team	1	2	3	4	5	6	7	8	9	10	11	12	13	14	15	Final
England	3	4	4	4	4	4	7	8	12	15	16	16	18	18	19	19
Malaysia	0	0	1	4	6	7	7	7	7	7	7	8	8	9	9	9
Report

29 July, 15:45
Team	1	2	3	4	5	6	7	8	9	10	11	12	13	14	15	Final
Scotland	0	5	6	6	6	7	10	11	11	14	14	16	16	20	20	20
England	1	1	1	5	7	7	7	7	11	11	12	12	14	14	14	14
Report

29 July, 15:45
Team	1	2	3	4	5	6	7	8	9	10	11	12	13	14	15	Final
Wales	1	3	3	3	3	5	5	5	6	8	10	11	12	12	15	15
Malaysia	0	0	5	8	9	9	11	12	12	12	12	12	12	14	14	14
Report

== Semifinals ==
30 July, 15:45
Team	1	2	3	4	5	6	7	8	9	10	11	12	13	14	15	Final
South Africa	0	1	1	1	4	5	5	6	7	8	8	11	12	13	15	15
England	3	3	4	5	5	5	6	6	6	6	9	9	9	9	9	9
Report

30 July, 15:45
Team	1	2	3	4	5	6	7	8	9	10	11	12	13	14	15	Final
Scotland	0	3	4	4	4	5	6	7	8	8	8	8	8	9	9	9
New Zealand	1	1	1	2	5	5	5	5	5	7	9	10	11	11	13	13
Report

== Finals ==
=== Gold medal match ===
31 July, 08:45
Rank	Team	1	2	3	4	5	6	7	8	9	10	11	12	13	14	15	Final
1st place, gold medalist(s)	South Africa	2	2	4	7	7	7	7	9	9	10	10	11	12	12	13	13
2nd place, silver medalist(s)	New Zealand	0	1	1	1	4	5	7	7	8	8	9	9	9	11	11	11
Report

=== Bronze medal match ===
31 July, 08:45
Rank	Team	1	2	3	4	5	6	7	8	9	10	11	12	13	14	15	16	Final
3rd place, bronze medalist(s)	England	0	2	2	2	2	5	5	6	6	7	7	8	8	10	12	16	16
4	Scotland	2	2	3	4	4	5	7	7	8	8	11	11	12	12	12	12	12
Report
