= Lawn bowls at the 2014 Commonwealth Games – Mixed para-sport pairs =

Lawn bowls – Mixed para-sport pairs at the 2014 Commonwealth Games
- Venue: Kelvingrove Lawn Bowls Centre
- Dates: 24–26 July 2014
- Competitors: 32 from 8 nations

Medalists
gold medal	Gwen Nel; Geoff Newcombe; Annatjie van Rooyen; Herman Scholtz	South Africa
silver medal	Robert Conway; Irene Edgar; Ron McArthur; David Thomas	Scotland
bronze medal	Joy Forster; Bruce Jones; Peter Scott; Tony Scott	Australia

The Mixed para-sport pairs at the 2014 Commonwealth Games, was part of the Lawn bowls category, which took place between 24 and 26 July 2014 at the Kelvingrove Lawn Bowls Centre. South Africa won the gold medal, defeating Scotland in the final. Australia won the bronze medal.

== Sectional play ==
=== Section A ===
Rank	Team	MP	MW	MT	ML	For	Ag	PD	Pts
1	South Africa	3	3	0	0	55	19	+36	9
2	New Zealand	3	2	0	1	38	32	+6	6
3	Canada	3	1	0	2	31	51	-20	3
4	Malaysia	3	0	0	3	23	45	-22	0

24 July, 11:45
Team	1	2	3	4	5	6	7	8	9	10	11	12	13	14	15	Final
Canada	0	0	0	0	0	0	0	0	0	3	4	4	5	5	5	5
South Africa	2	3	4	7	10	12	14	16	19	19	19	20	20	21	23	23
Report

24 July, 11:45
Team	1	2	3	4	5	6	7	8	9	10	11	12	13	14	Final
New Zealand	2	2	2	2	4	4	4	4	5	6	6	8	9	11	11
Malaysia	0	1	2	3	3	4	5	7	7	7	8	8	8	8	8
Report

24 July, 18:45
Team	1	2	3	4	5	6	7	8	9	10	11	12	13	Final
Canada	1	1	4	4	5	5	9	10	11	11	12	12	16	16
Malaysia	0	1	1	2	2	4	4	4	4	7	7	8	8	8
Report

24 July, 18:45
Team	1	2	3	4	5	6	7	8	9	10	11	12	13	14	15	Final
New Zealand	0	0	0	1	1	2	2	3	3	3	6	6	7	7	7	7
South Africa	1	3	4	4	5	5	6	6	8	9	9	10	10	11	14	14
Report

25 July, 11:45
Team	1	2	3	4	5	6	7	8	9	10	11	12	13	14	15	Final
Canada	0	2	2	5	5	5	5	5	6	8	9	10	10	10	10	10
New Zealand	1	1	4	4	7	10	11	13	13	13	13	13	17	18	20	20
Report

25 July, 11:45
Team	1	2	3	4	5	6	7	8	9	10	11	12	13	14	15	Final
Malaysia	0	0	0	1	2	3	3	3	4	4	4	4	5	5	7	7
South Africa	3	6	8	8	8	8	10	12	12	15	16	17	17	18	18	18
Report

=== Section B ===
Rank	Team	MP	MW	MT	ML	For	Ag	PD	Pts
1	Scotland	3	3	0	0	41	22	+19	9
2	Australia	3	1	0	2	46	38	+8	3
3	England	3	1	0	2	31	35	-4	3
4	Wales	3	1	0	2	24	47	-23	3

24 July, 11:45
Team	1	2	3	4	5	6	7	8	9	10	11	12	13	14	Final
Wales	0	0	3	3	4	4	5	5	6	6	6	6	6	6	6
Scotland	1	3	3	4	4	5	5	8	8	10	12	14	15	16	16
Report

24 July, 11:45
Team	1	2	3	4	5	6	7	8	9	10	11	12	13	14	15	Final
England	0	1	1	1	4	4	7	7	8	12	12	12	13	17	17	17
Australia	1	1	2	6	6	7	7	8	8	8	9	12	12	12	13	13
Report

24 July, 18:45
Team	1	2	3	4	5	6	7	8	9	10	11	12	13	Final
England	0	0	1	2	3	3	4	4	4	5	6	7	7	7
Scotland	1	4	4	4	4	5	5	6	9	9	9	9	10	10
Report

24 July, 18:45
Team	1	2	3	4	5	6	7	8	9	10	11	12	13	14	15	Final
Wales	0	0	0	0	0	0	0	0	1	3	3	3	3	3	6	6
Australia	2	5	6	7	10	12	15	18	18	18	19	22	23	24	24	24
Report

25 July, 11:45
Team	1	2	3	4	5	6	7	8	9	10	11	12	13	14	15	Final
England	1	2	2	3	3	4	4	4	5	5	5	6	7	7	7	7
Wales	0	0	1	1	3	3	4	5	5	6	7	7	7	10	12	12
Report

25 July, 11:45
Team	1	2	3	4	5	6	7	8	9	10	11	12	13	14	Final
Scotland	0	0	3	6	6	7	9	9	10	12	13	14	15	15	14
Australia	1	3	3	3	6	6	6	7	7	7	7	7	7	9	9
Report

== Semifinals ==
25 July, 18:45
Team	1	2	3	4	5	6	7	8	9	10	11	12	13	14	Final
South Africa	0	2	4	8	11	11	12	14	16	16	18	19	23	23	23
New Zealand	1	1	1	1	1	2	2	2	2	4	4	4	4	5	5
Report

25 July, 18:45
Team	1	2	3	4	5	6	7	8	9	10	11	12	13	14	15	Final
Scotland	1	1	1	5	5	6	6	11	13	14	14	17	18	18	18	18
Australia	0	1	3	3	6	6	7	7	7	7	10	10	10	12	14	14
Report

== Finals ==
=== Gold medal ===
26 July, 11:45
Rank	Team	1	2	3	4	5	6	7	8	9	10	11	12	13	14	15	Final
1st place, gold medalist(s)	South Africa	1	2	2	2	5	5	7	8	8	9	10	10	10	13	14	14
2nd place, silver medalist(s)	Scotland	0	0	1	2	2	5	5	5	6	6	6	8	10	10	10	10
Report

=== Bronze medal ===
26 July, 11:45
Rank	Team	1	2	3	4	5	6	7	8	9	10	11	12	13	14	15	Final
3rd place, bronze medalist(s)	Australia	2	5	5	6	7	7	7	7	8	8	9	12	13	14	14	14
4	New Zealand	0	0	3	3	3	5	7	8	8	9	9	9	9	9	11	11
Report
