= Percy Love =

Australian rules footballer

Personal information
- Full name: Percy Albert Ernest Love
- Born: 6 October 1899; South Yarra, Victoria
- Died: 19 May 1976 (aged 76); Cheltenham, Victoria
- Original team: Prahran

Playing career^{1}
Years	Club	Games (Goals)
1919	Melbourne	11 (6)
- ^{1} Playing statistics correct to the end of 1919.

Percy Albert Ernest Love (6 October 1899 – 19 May 1976) was an Australian rules footballer who played with Melbourne in the Victorian Football League (VFL). Brother of Bob Love.
