= Lawn bowls at the 2018 Commonwealth Games – Open para-sport triples =

Lawn bowls – Open para-sport triples at the 2018 Commonwealth Games
- Venue: Broadbeach Bowls Club
- Dates: 5 – 12 April 2018
- Competitors: 18 from 6 nations

Medalists
gold medal	Josh Thornton; Ken Hanson; Tony Bonnell	Australia
silver medal	Barry Wynks; Bruce Wakefield; Mark Noble	New Zealand
bronze medal	Christopher Patton; Tobias Botha; Willem Viljoen	South Africa

Lawn bowls open para-sport triples at the 2018 Commonwealth Games was held at the Broadbeach Bowls Club in the Gold Coast, Australia from April 5 to 12. A total of 18 athletes from 6 associations participated in the event.

== Sectional play ==
The top four advances to the knockout round.

=== Section A ===
Rank	Nation	Athletes	MP	MW	MT	ML	FR	AG	PD	PTS
1	Australia	Josh Thornton, Ken Hanson, Tony Bonnell	5	4	0	1	81	55	26	12
2	England	Kieran Rollings, Michael Robertson, Paul Brown	5	3	1	1	73	62	11	11
3	New Zealand	Barry Wynks, Bruce Wakefield, Mark Noble	5	3	0	2	85	54	31	9
4	South Africa	Christopher Patton, Tobias Botha, Willem Viljoen	5	2	1	2	70	56	14	7
5	Scotland	Garry Brown, Michael Nicoll, Michael Simpson	5	1	0	4	59	72	-13	3
6	Wales	Jonathan Hubbard, Pauline Wilson, Raymond Lillycorp	5	1	0	4	40	109	-69	0

== Knockout stage ==
Semifinal
1	Australia	15
4	South Africa	7
2	England	11
3	New Zealand	18

Final
1	Australia	14
3	New Zealand	13
Bronze medal
4	South Africa	16
2	England	13
