= Irene Edgar =

Scottish lawn bowler

Personal information
- Nationality: Scottish
- Born: 21 October 1957 (age 68)

Sport
- Country: Scotland
- Sport: Bowls
Medal record
Commonwealth Games
| Silver medal – second place | 2014 Glasgow | mixed para-sport pairs |

Irene Edgar (born 21 October 1957) is a Scottish lawn bowler.

Edgar has a visual impairment.

She competed at the 2014 Commonwealth Games where she won a silver medal in the mixed para-sport pairs event. She also competed at the 2018 Commonwealth Games.
