= Bruce Wakefield =

New Zealand lawn bowls competitor

Personal information
- Born: 7 November 1960 (age 65) Waimate, New Zealand
Medal record
Para-sport lawn bowls
Representing New Zealand
Commonwealth Games
Silver medal – second place	2018 Gold Coast	Open triples

Bruce Wakefield (born 7 November 1960) is a New Zealand lawn bowler. He won the silver medal, along with teammates Mark Noble and Barry Wynks, in the Open para-sport triples event at the 2018 Commonwealth Games.
