= Lawn bowls at the 2010 Commonwealth Games – Women's singles =

The women's singles competition began on 9 October 2010. and finished on 13 October 2010. Natalie Melmore of England won the gold medal, defeating New Zealand's Val Smith in the final. Kelsey Cottrell from Australia won the bronze medal.

== Results ==
=== Qualifying – round robin ===
==== Section A ====
Pos	Player	P	W	L	F	A	Pts	Sets
1	(Malaysia) Siti Zalina Ahmad	10	10	0	212	88	20	+20
2	(Scotland) Claire Johnston	10	7	3	169	141	14	+1
3	(New Zealand) Val Smith	10	6	4	158	139	12	+4
4	(Norfolk Island) Carmen Anderson	10	5	5	144	135	10	+3
5	(Canada) Josephine Lee	10	5	5	134	147	10	-1
6	(Guernsey) Alison Merrien	10	5	5	148	156	10	-2
7	(India) Farzana Khan	10	5	5	125	162	10	-5
8	(South Africa) Helen Grundlingh	10	4	6	153	138	8	+1
9	(Botswana) Lebogang Mascarenhas	10	4	6	131	151	8	-5
10	(Malta) Carmela Spiteri	10	3	7	117	168	6	-9
11	(Jersey) Rachel MacDonald	10	2	8	110	176	4	-7

==== Section B ====
Pos	Player	P	W	L	F	A	Pts	Sets
1	(Australia) Kelsey Cottrell	9	9	0	189	96	18	+12
2	(England) Natalie Melmore	9	7	2	175	99	14	+8
3	(Wales) Carol Difford	9	5	4	157	117	10	+4
4	(Malawi) Zelda Humphreys	9	5	4	116	160	10	+1
5	(Zambia) Kasonde Hilda	9	5	4	118	135	10	-2
6	(Niue) Hina Rereiti	9	4	5	125	130	8	-1
7	(Samoa) Dolly Maessen	9	4	5	107	150	8	-3
8	(Papua New Guinea) Michelle Soten	9	2	7	127	145	4	-6
9	(Kenya) Susan Kariuki	9	2	7	117	146	4	-6
10	(Cook Islands) Irene Tupuna	9	2	7	105	158	4	-7

=== Finals ===
Quarterfinals
Siti Zalina Ahmad (MAS)
Bye
Carol Difford (WAL)	6	1
Natalie Melmore (ENG)	6	13
Kelsey Cottrell (AUS)
Bye
Claire Johnston (SCO)	7	5
Val Smith (NZL)	9	6

Semifinals
Siti Zalina Ahmad (MAS)	6	2	1
Natalie Melmore (ENG)	5	9	2
Kelsey Cottrell (AUS)	7	8	3
Val Smith (NZL)	9	4	4

Gold Medal Match
Natalie Melmore (ENG)	7	11
Val Smith (NZL)	6	2
Bronze Medal Match
Siti Zalina Ahmad (MAS)	5	10	1
Kelsey Cottrell (AUS)	12	6	2

== See also ==
- Lawn bowls at the 2010 Commonwealth Games
