= Barry Wynks =

New Zealand lawn bowler (1952–2020)

Barry Wynks QSM
Personal information
- Full name: Barry Graham Wynks
- Born: 5 November 1952 Palmerston North, New Zealand
- Died: 10 December 2020 (aged 68) Palmerston North, New Zealand
Medal record
Para-sport lawn bowls
Representing New Zealand
Commonwealth Games
Silver medal – second place	2018 Gold Coast	Open triples
Silver medal – second place	2014 Glasgow	Open triples

Barry Graham Wynks QSM (5 November 1952 – 10 December 2020) was a New Zealand lawn bowler.

Wynks won the silver medal, along with teammates Lynda Bennett and Mark Noble, in the Open para-sport triples event at the 2014 Commonwealth Games. He won another silver medal, along with teammates Mark Noble and Bruce Wakefield, in the Open para-sport triples event at the 2018 Commonwealth Games.

An accomplished table tennis player, Wynks represented the Manawatu centre for many years, and reached the last 32 in the men's singles at the New Zealand table tennis championships in 1972 and 1973. In the 1982 New Year Honours, Wynks was awarded the Queen's Service Medal for community service.

Wynks died on 10 December 2020 at the age of 68.
