= David Fisher (bowls) =

British lawn bowler

Personal information
- Nationality: British
- Born: 24 February 1956 (age 70) Iserlohn, Germany
- Height: 5 ft 11 in (180 cm)
- Weight: 83 kg (183 lb)

Sport
- Sport: Lawn bowls
- Event: Open para-sport triples
Medal record
Representing England
Men's lawn bowls
Commonwealth Games
| Bronze medal – third place | 2014 Glasgow | Open para-sport triples |

David Fisher (born 24 February 1956) is a British lawn bowler. He competed for England in the open para-sport triples event at the 2014 Commonwealth Games where he won a bronze medal.
