= Lynda Bennett =

New Zealand lawn bowler

Personal information
- Nationality: New Zealand
- Born: 10 April 1954 (age 72) Whakatāne, New Zealand
- Height: 1.61 m (5 ft 3 in)
Medal record
Para-sport lawn bowls
Representing New Zealand
Commonwealth Games
Silver medal – second place	2014 Glasgow	Open triples

Lynda Bennett (born 10 April 1954) is a New Zealand lawn bowler. She won the silver medal, along with teammates Barry Wynks and Mark Noble, in the Open para-sport triples event at the 2014 Commonwealth Games.
