= Natalie Melmore =

English lawn bowler (born 1989)

Natalie Chestney
Personal information
- Nationality: British (English)
- Born: Natalie Melmore; 28 July 1989 (age 37) Torquay, England

Sport
- Sport: Lawn bowls
Medal record
Representing England
World Outdoor Championships
Bronze medal – third place	2012 Adelaide	women's singles
Commonwealth Games
Gold medal – first place	2010 Delhi	women's singles
Silver medal – second place	2014 Glasgow	women's singles
Silver medal – second place	2014 Glasgow	women's pairs
Gold medal – first place	2022 Birmingham	women's triples
Atlantic Bowls Championships
Silver medal – second place	2011 Paphos	singles
Silver medal – second place	2011 Paphos	triples
Bronze medal – third place	2019 Cardiff	singles
Bronze medal – third place	2019 Cardiff	pairs
British Isles Championships
Gold medal – first place	2015	singles
Gold medal – first place	2012	fours
Gold medal – first place	2017	pairs
Gold medal – first place	2017	triples
Gold medal – first place	2019	fours

Natalie Melmore (married name Natalie Chestney, born 28 July 1989 in Torquay) is a lawn bowler from Newton Abbot.

== Bowls career ==
Natalie represented England at the 2010 Commonwealth Games where she won a gold medal in the women's singles event. In 2011 she won the singles and triples silver medals at the Atlantic Bowls Championships.

Natalie went on to win a further two silver medals in the 2014 Commonwealth Games in the women's singles and women's pairs events with partner Jamie-Lea Winch.

In 2016 she secured a fourth and fifth National title win and in 2018 was part of the fours that won the National Championships. After her 2014 singles success she subsequently won the singles at the British Isles Bowls Championships in 2015.

She was selected as part of the English team for the 2018 Commonwealth Games on the Gold Coast in Queensland. In 2019 she won the singles and pairs bronze medals at the Atlantic Bowls Championships.

In 2022, she competed in the women's triples and the Women's fours at the 2022 Commonwealth Games. She won the gold medal in the triples with Jamie-Lea Winch and Sian Honnor.

== Personal life ==
In 2015, she married Jamie Chestney.
