= Mark Noble (sportsman) =

New Zealand chess and lawn bowls player (born 1962)

Personal information
- Born: Mark Fredrick Noble; 30 September 1962 (age 64) Wellington, New Zealand
- Chess career
- Title: FIDE Master (1992); ICCF Grandmaster (2010)
- FIDE rating: 2211 (February 2018)
- Peak rating: 2320 (January 1991)
- ICCF rating: 2475 (October 2021)
- ICCF peak rating: 2575 (April 2011)

Sport
- Country: New Zealand
- Sport: Chess; Lawn bowls
Medal record
Para-sport lawn bowls
Representing New Zealand
Commonwealth Games
Silver medal – second place	2026 Glasgow	Men's pairs B6–8
Silver medal – second place	2018 Gold Coast	Open triples
Silver medal – second place	2014 Glasgow	Open triples

Mark Fredrick Noble (born 30 September 1962) is a New Zealand chess and lawn bowls player. He was awarded the title of International Correspondence Chess Grandmaster (GM) in 2010, the first New Zealand player to be awarded this title, and holds the title of FIDE Master (FM) for over the board chess. He also holds the FIDE title of National Arbiter.

At the age of 13, he was disabled after being hit by a motorist, smashing his left hip. However, as a lawn bowler, he generally competes with able-bodied players.

Noble competed in the Open para-sport triples event at the 2014 Commonwealth Games where he won the silver medal with teammates Lynda Bennett and Barry Wynks. He won another silver medal, along with teammates Bruce Wakefield and Barry Wynks, in the Open para-sport triples event at the 2018 Commonwealth Games.

In the Men's pairs B6–8 event at the 2026 Commonwealth Games, Noble secured the silver medal with partner Kurt Smith.
