= Bob Love (footballer) =

Australian rules footballer

Personal information
- Full name: Robert James Henry Love
- Born: 20 July 1896; South Yarra, Victoria
- Died: 15 March 1960 (aged 63); Camberwell, Victoria
- Original team: Prahran

Playing career^{1}
Years	Club	Games (Goals)
1919	Melbourne	8 (1)
- ^{1} Playing statistics correct to the end of 1919.

Robert James Henry Love (20 July 1896 – 15 March 1960) was an Australian rules footballer who played with Melbourne in the Victorian Football League (VFL). He was the brother of Percy Love.
