= Paul Brown (bowls) =

British lawn bowler

Personal information
- Nationality: British
- Born: 29 December 1978 (age 47) Bristol, England
- Height: 5 ft 11 in (180 cm)
- Weight: 71 kg (157 lb)

Sport
- Sport: Lawn bowls
- Event: Open para-sport triples
Medal record
Men's lawn bowls
Representing England
Commonwealth Games
Bronze medal – third place	2014 Glasgow	Open para-sport triples

Paul Brown (born 29 December 1978) is a British lawn bowler. He competed for England at the 2014 Commonwealth Games in the open para-sport triples event, where he won a bronze medal. Brown competed again for England at the 2018 Commonwealth Games in the open para-sport triples event. He competed for Wales at the 2022 Commonwealth Games in the men's pairs B6–8 event.
