= Colleen Piketh =

South African lawn bowler (born 1972)

Personal information
- Nationality: South African
- Born: 26 December 1972 (age 53) Johannesburg, South Africa

Sport
- Sport: Lawn bowls
- Club: Bedfordview BC; George BC; Discovery BC
Medal record
Representing South Africa
World Outdoor Championships
| Bronze medal – third place | 2012 Adelaide | Women's fours |
Commonwealth Games
| Gold medal – first place | 2014 Glasgow | Women's pairs |
| Bronze medal – third place | 2014 Glasgow | Women's singles |
| Silver medal – second place | 2018 Gold Coast | Women's pairs |
| Bronze medal – third place | 2018 Gold Coast | Women's singles |
Atlantic Bowls Championships
| Gold medal – first place | 2007 Ayr | singles |
| Silver medal – second place | 2011 Paphos | pairs |
| Silver medal – second place | 2011 Paphos | fours |
| Gold medal – first place | 2015 Paphos | pairs |
| Gold medal – first place | 2019 Cardiff | pairs |
National Championships
| Gold medal – first place | 2021 | pairs |
| Gold medal – first place | 2021 | pairs |

Colleen Piketh (née Webb; born 26 December 1972) is a South African international lawn bowler.

== Bowls career ==
In 2007 she won the singles gold medal at the Atlantic Bowls Championships. In 2011 she won the pairs and fours silver medals at the Atlantic Bowls Championships.

Piketh competed in the women's pairs and the women's singles events at the 2014 Commonwealth Games where she won a gold and bronze medal respectively. She won a gold medal in the women's pairs at the World Bowls Atlantic Bowls Championships in Cyprus in 2015, together with Nici Neal. Piketh also competed in the singles format at the same tournament, losing to Guernsey's Lucy Beere 21–15 in the medal playoff game.

Piketh was part of South Africa's team for the 2018 Commonwealth Games in Gold Coast, Australia, where she won a bronze medal in the singles event and a silver medal in the pairs.

She won the 2018 pairs at the South African National Bowls Championships bowling for the George Bowls Club with Elma Davis.

In 2019, she won the pairs gold medal at the Atlantic Bowls Championships and in 2020, she was selected for the 2020 World Outdoor Bowls Championship in Gold Coast, Australia, but the event was cancelled due to the COVID-19 pandemic.

In 2021, she won a second women's pairs title at the South African National Bowls Championships, this time partnering Thabelo Muvhango for the Discovery Bowls Club. In 2022, she competed in the women's singles and the women's pairs at the 2022 Commonwealth Games.

In 2023, she was selected again as part of the team to represent South Africa at the 2023 World Outdoor Bowls Championship. She participated in the women's singles and the women's pairs events. In the singles, Piketh finished second in her group before losing her quarter final to Katherine Rednall.

Piketh was selected for the national team at the 2024 African States Tournament in Botswana.
