= Bob Love (bowls) =

British lawn bowler (born 1954)

Bob Love BEM
Personal information
- Nationality: British
- Born: 24 April 1954 (age 72) Birmingham, England
- Height: 5 ft 8 in (173 cm)
- Weight: 70 kg (150 lb)

Sport
- Sport: Lawn bowls and indoor bowls
- Event: Open para-sport triples
- Club: Tamworth IBC
Medal record
Representing England
Men's lawn bowls
Commonwealth Games
Bronze medal – third place	2014 Glasgow	Open para-sport triples

Robert Alan Love (born 24 April 1954) is a British lawn bowler. He competed for England in the open para-sport triples event at the 2014 Commonwealth Games where he won a bronze medal. Bob currently plays at Tamworth IBC in inter club competitions and leagues.
