= Matt Flapper =

Australian international lawn bowler

Personal information
- Nationality: Australian
- Born: 13 November 1978 (age 47) Creswick, Victoria, Australia

Sport
- Sport: Lawn bowls
Medal record
Representing Australia
Men's lawn bowls
Commonwealth Games
Bronze medal – third place	2014 Glasgow	Men's fours

Matt Flapper (born 15 November 1978) is an Australian international lawn bowler. He competed in the men's fours at the 2014 Commonwealth Games where he won a bronze medal.
