= Petrus Breitenbach =

South African lawn bowler

Personal information
- Nationality: South African
- Born: 25 March 1987 (age 39) Potchefstroom, South Africa
- Height: 6 ft 0 in (183 cm)
- Weight: 105 kg (231 lb)

Sport
- Club: Potchefstroom Town BC
Medal record
Men's lawn bowls
Representing South Africa
Commonwealth Games
Gold medal – first place	2014 Glasgow	Men's triples
World Outdoor Championships
Silver medal – second place	2012 Adelaide	Men's fours
Bronze medal – third place	2012 Adelaide	Men's team

Petrus 'Pierre' Breitenbach (born 25 March 1987) is a South African lawn bowler.

== Bowls career ==
He competed in the men's triples at the 2014 Commonwealth Games where he won a gold medal.

He won the 2013 fours at the National Championships bowling for the Potchefstroom Town Bowls Club.

In 2020 he was selected for the 2020 World Outdoor Bowls Championship in Australia. In 2022, he competed in the men's triples and the men's fours at the 2022 Commonwealth Games.
