= Neil Speirs =

Scottish lawn bowler

Personal information
- Born: 18 January 1979 (age 47) Edinburgh, Scotland
- Height: 6 ft 0 in (183 cm)
- Weight: 89 kg (196 lb)

Sport
- Sport: Lawn bowls
- Club: Kirkliston (Outdoor)
Medal record
Representing Scotland
Men's lawn bowls
Commonwealth Games
Gold medal – first place	2014 Glasgow	Men's fours
World Cup Singles
Gold medal – first place	2006 Warilla	singles
Atlantic Bowls Championships
Gold medal – first place	2015 Paphos	triples
Silver medal – second place	2015 Paphos	fours

Neil Speirs (born 18 January 1979) is a Scottish international lawn bowler.

== Bowls career ==
He competed for Scotland in the men's fours at the 2014 Commonwealth Games where he won a gold medal.

He had won the gold medal at the 2006 World Cup Singles in Warilla, New South Wales, Australia. In 2015, he won the triples gold medal and fours silver medal at the Atlantic Bowls Championships.
