= John McGuinness (bowls) =

British lawn bowler

Personal information
- Nationality: England
- Born: 17 May 1967 (age 59) Derry, Northern Ireland
- Height: 5 ft 11 in (180 cm)
- Weight: 90 kg (200 lb)

Sport
- Country: England
- Sport: Lawn bowls
- Event: Men's fours
Medal record
Representing England
Men's Lawn bowls
Commonwealth Games
Silver medal – second place	2014 Glasgow	Men's fours

John McGuinness (born 17 May 1967) is an English lawn bowler. He competed in the men's fours at the 2014 Commonwealth Games where he won a silver medal.
