= Kelvingrove Lawn Bowls Centre =

Sports complex in Glasgow, Scotland

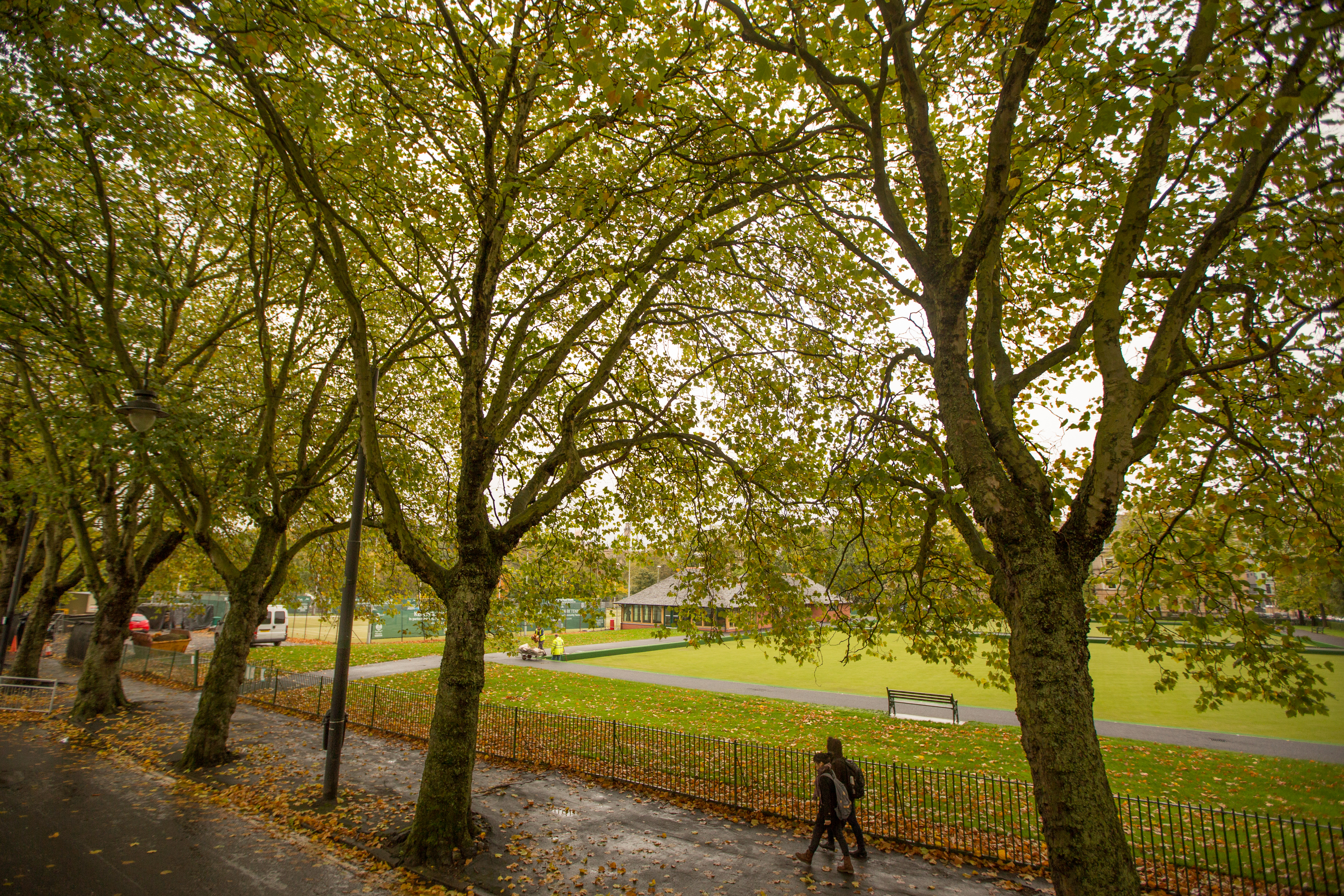
Kelvingrove Lawn Bowls Centre

The Kelvingrove Lawn Bowls and Tennis Centre is a sports complex located in Glasgow, Scotland. Located on Kelvin Way off Sauchiehall Street and adjacent to the Kelvingrove Art Gallery and Museum, Kelvingrove Park and the Yorkhill and Kelvingrove residential neighbourhoods, it is owned by Glasgow City Council and was a venue for the 2014 Commonwealth Games and has been used for the purpose since at least 1910. In addition to a number of lawn bowls greens, the facility has six artificial grass tennis courts which are available to the public to play for free.

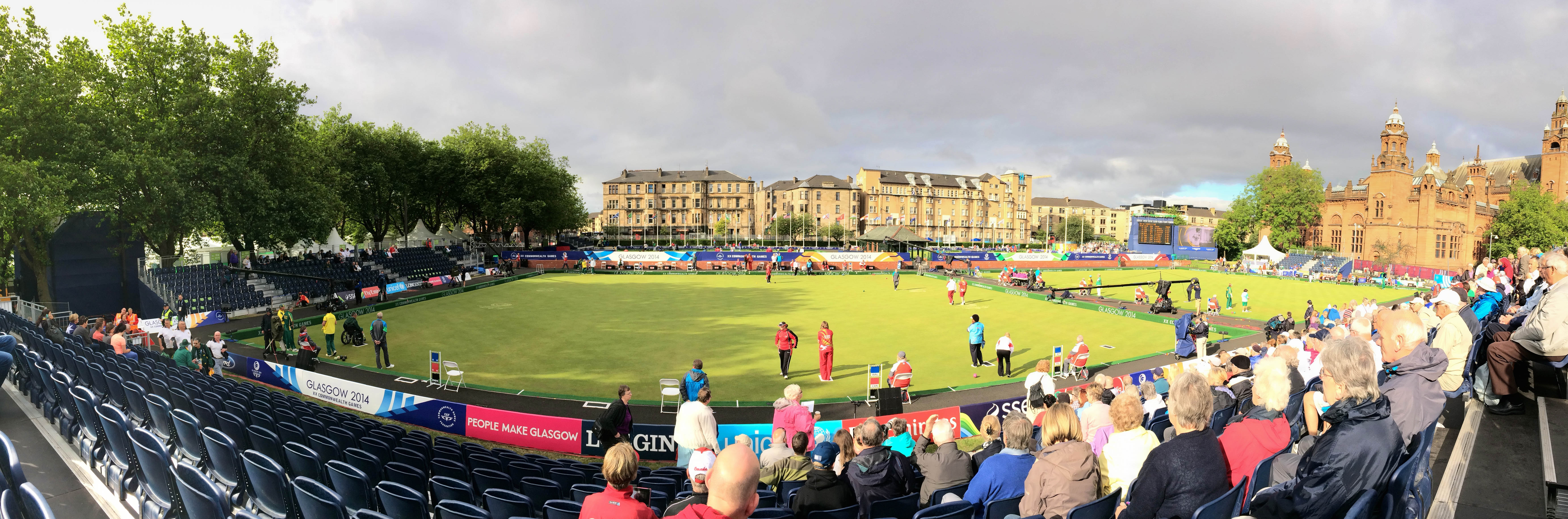
The bowls centre during the 2014 Commonwealth Games

Prior to becoming an extension of the park to serve as the venue for the International Exhibition of Science, Art and Industry in 1888, the land was occupied by Kelvinbank House, a mansion dating from the 1780s, with the property sited almost exactly on the location of the bowling centre pavilion.

== See also ==
- Lawn bowls at the 2014 Commonwealth Games
