= Lawn bowls at the 2014 Commonwealth Games – Men's singles =

Lawn bowls – Men's singles at the 2014 Commonwealth Games
- Venue: Kelvingrove Lawn Bowls Centre
- Dates: 27 July – 01 August 2014
- Competitors: 23 from 23 nations

Medalists
gold medal	Darren Burnett	Scotland
silver medal	Ryan Bester	Canada
bronze medal	Aron Sherriff	Australia

The Men's singles at the 2014 Commonwealth Games, was part of the lawn bowls competition, which took place between 27 July and 1 August 2014 at the Kelvingrove Lawn Bowls Centre. Scotland's Darren Burnett won the gold medal, defeating Ryan Bester of Canada in the final. Aron Sherriff from Australia won the bronze medal.

== Sectional play ==
=== Section A ===
Rank	Team	MP	MW	MT	ML	For	Ag	PD	Pts
1	Aron Sherriff (AUS)	4	4	0	0	84	52	+32	12
2	Sam Tolchard (ENG)	4	3	0	1	81	62	+19	9
3	Rob Weale (WAL)	4	2	0	2	65	68	-3	6
4	Ngugi Waweru Njuguna (KEN)	4	1	0	3	66	72	-6	3
5	Dalton Tagelagi (NIU)	4	0	0	4	42	84	-42	0

27 July, 17:30
Name	1	2	3	4	5	6	7	8	9	10	11	12	13	14	15	16	Final
Aron Sherriff (AUS)	0	1	3	6	9	12	12	12	13	13	14	16	17	18	18	21	21
Dalton Tagelagi (NIU)	1	1	1	1	1	1	3	4	4	5	5	5	5	5	6	6	6
Report

27 July, 17:30
Name	1	2	3	4	5	6	7	8	9	10	11	12	Final
Rob Weale (WAL)	0	0	4	8	8	8	8	12	13	16	19	21	21
Ngugi Waweru Njuguna (KEN)	1	2	2	2	5	7	8	8	8	8	8	8	8
Report

29 July, 08:45
Name	1	2	3	4	5	6	7	8	9	10	11	12	13	14	15	16	17	18	19	20	21	22	23	24	25	Final
Rob Weale (WAL)	1	1	2	4	4	5	5	5	5	5	5	5	6	8	8	9	10	10	10	12	12	12	12	12	12	12
Sam Tolchard (ENG)	0	1	1	1	3	3	4	5	7	8	9	11	11	11	12	12	12	13	14	14	15	17	19	20	21	21
Report

29 July, 08:45
Name	1	2	3	4	5	6	7	8	9	10	11	12	13	14	15	16	17	18	Final
Ngugi Waweru Njuguna (KEN)	2	3	5	5	5	8	8	11	11	13	17	17	18	19	19	20	20	21	21
Dalton Tagelagi (NIU)	0	0	0	1	2	2	3	3	4	4	4	5	5	5	8	8	9	9	9
Report

29 July, 15:45
Name	1	2	3	4	5	6	7	8	9	10	11	12	13	14	15	16	17	18	19	20	21	22	23	Final
Aron Sherriff (AUS)	2	2	3	5	5	5	6	8	8	8	8	10	10	10	12	13	14	16	16	16	16	19	21	21
Ngugi Waweru Njuguna (KEN)	0	1	1	1	2	4	4	4	5	7	8	8	9	12	12	12	12	12	13	15	17	17	17	17
Report

29 July, 15:45
Name	1	2	3	4	5	6	7	8	9	10	11	12	13	14	15	16	Final
Sam Tolchard (ENG)	0	2	4	4	7	7	7	7	9	13	13	16	18	19	20	21	21
Dalton Tagelagi (NIU)	1	1	1	3	3	4	6	7	7	7	9	9	9	9	9	9	9
Report

30 July, 08:45
Name	1	2	3	4	5	6	7	8	9	10	11	12	13	14	15	16	17	18	19	20	21	22	23	24	25	26	27	28	Final
Aron Sherriff (AUS)	0	3	3	3	3	5	5	5	6	9	10	10	10	12	13	14	14	14	16	16	18	18	18	19	19	20	20	21	21
Sam Tolchard (ENG)	2	2	3	4	5	5	6	7	7	7	7	8	9	9	9	9	10	11	11	12	12	13	14	14	17	17	18	18	18
Report

30 July, 08:45
Name	1	2	3	4	5	6	7	8	9	10	11	12	13	14	15	16	17	18	19	20	21	22	23	Final
Rob Weale (WAL)	0	3	5	5	7	7	7	7	7	9	9	12	14	16	16	16	17	17	17	19	19	19	21	21
Dalton Tagelagi (NIU)	1	1	1	2	2	4	6	7	8	8	9	9	9	9	10	11	11	12	14	14	16	18	18	18
Report

30 July, 15:45
Name	1	2	3	4	5	6	7	8	9	10	11	12	13	14	15	16	17	18	19	20	Final
Aron Sherriff (AUS)	2	3	5	5	7	7	10	13	14	15	15	15	16	16	16	17	19	19	20	21	21
Rob Weale (WAL)	0	0	0	2	2	3	3	3	3	3	5	6	6	7	9	9	9	11	11	11	11
Report

30 July, 15:45
Name	1	2	3	4	5	6	7	8	9	10	11	12	13	14	15	16	17	18	19	20	21	22	23	24	Final
Sam Tolchard (ENG)	0	1	2	2	3	5	5	5	5	5	9	9	10	10	12	12	15	17	17	17	17	17	18	21	21
Ngugi Waweru Njuguna (KEN)	2	2	2	3	3	3	5	7	8	9	9	9	9	12	12	14	14	14	16	17	19	20	20	20	20
Report

=== Section B ===
Rank	Team	MP	MW	MT	ML	For	Ag	PD	Pts
1	Ryan Bester (CAN)	4	4	0	0	84	55	29	12
2	Muhammad Hizlee Abdul Rais (MAS)	4	3	0	1	74	65	9	9
3	Sunil Bahadur (IND)	4	2	0	2	71	72	-1	6
4	Samuela Tuikiligana (FIJ)	4	1	0	3	71	79	-8	3
5	Muhammad Shahzad (PAK)	4	0	0	4	54	83	-29	0

27 July, 17:30
Name	1	2	3	4	5	6	7	8	9	10	11	12	13	14	15	16	17	18	19	20	21	22	23	24	25	26	Final
Muhammad Hizlee Abdul Rais (MAS)	2	2	4	6	8	8	9	9	11	11	11	11	11	11	12	12	12	14	15	15	17	17	19	20	20	21	21
Sunil Bahadur (IND)	0	2	2	2	2	4	4	5	5	7	8	9	11	12	12	13	16	16	16	17	17	19	19	19	20	20	20
Report

27 July, 17:30
Name	1	2	3	4	5	6	7	8	9	10	11	12	13	14	15	16	17	18	19	20	21	Final
Samuela Tuikiligana (FIJ)	2	2	6	6	6	6	9	11	14	15	15	16	17	18	18	18	19	19	20	20	21	21
Muhammad Shahzad (PAK)	0	1	1	3	5	6	6	6	6	6	7	7	7	7	8	11	11	13	13	16	16	16
Report

29 July, 08:45
Name	1	2	3	4	5	6	7	8	9	10	11	12	13	14	15	16	17	18	19	20	21	22	Final
Ryan Bester (CAN)	2	2	5	5	5	6	7	7	7	7	9	10	10	13	15	15	15	16	16	19	19	21	21
Muhammad Shahzad (PAK)	0	2	2	3	4	4	4	5	6	7	7	7	8	8	8	9	10	10	12	12	15	15	15
Report

29 July, 08:45
Name	1	2	3	4	5	6	7	8	9	10	11	12	13	14	15	16	17	18	19	20	21	22	23	24	25	Final
Muhammad Hizlee Abdul Rais (MAS)	0	2	3	3	4	5	6	8	8	8	8	10	13	15	16	18	18	18	18	18	18	18	18	20	21	21
Samuela Tuikiligana (FIJ)	1	1	1	2	2	2	2	2	4	5	6	6	6	6	6	6	7	9	11	15	16	17	19	19	19	19
Report

29 July, 15:45
Name	1	2	3	4	5	6	7	8	9	10	11	12	13	14	15	16	17	18	Final
Ryan Bester (CAN)	3	4	5	7	10	11	12	12	12	12	14	15	15	16	16	16	19	21	21
Sunil Bahadur (IND)	0	0	0	0	0	0	0	3	5	7	7	7	8	8	9	10	10	10	10
Report

29 July, 15:45
Name	1	2	3	4	5	6	7	8	9	10	11	12	13	14	15	16	17	18	19	20	21	22	23	24	25	Final
Muhammad Hizlee Abdul Rais (MAS)	0	2	3	3	4	5	6	8	8	8	8	10	13	15	16	18	18	18	18	18	18	18	18	20	21	21
Samuela Tuikiligana (FIJ)	1	1	1	2	2	2	2	2	4	5	6	6	6	6	6	6	7	9	11	15	16	17	19	19	19	19
Report

30 July, 08:45
Name	1	2	3	4	5	6	7	8	9	10	11	12	13	14	15	16	17	18	19	20	21	22	23	24	25	26	27	28	Final
Ryan Bester (CAN)	0	1	1	3	3	3	4	4	5	5	6	6	6	7	7	7	8	11	11	12	14	14	14	16	17	20	20	21	21
Samuela Tuikiligana (FIJ)	1	1	2	2	3	4	4	5	5	7	7	8	11	11	13	14	14	14	15	15	15	16	18	18	18	18	19	19	19
Report

30 July, 08:45
Name	1	2	3	4	5	6	7	8	9	10	11	12	13	14	15	16	17	18	19	20	21	22	23	24	25	Final
Sunil Bahadur (IND)	0	0	1	2	6	6	6	8	8	8	9	9	10	11	11	11	12	12	14	15	18	18	19	20	20	20
Muhammad Shahzar (PAK)	1	2	2	2	2	3	6	6	8	10	10	11	11	11	14	15	15	16	16	16	16	17	17	17	18	18
Report

30 July, 15:45
Name	1	2	3	4	5	6	7	8	9	10	11	12	13	14	15	16	17	18	19	20	Final
Ryan Bester (CAN)	0	0	2	4	6	9	10	11	11	13	14	15	15	17	17	19	20	20	20	21	21
Muhammad Hizlee Abdul Rais (MAS)	1	2	2	2	2	2	2	2	4	4	4	4	6	6	7	7	7	9	11	11	11
Report

30 July, 15:45
Name	1	2	3	4	5	6	7	8	9	10	11	12	13	14	15	16	17	18	19	20	21	22	Final
Samuela Tuikiligana (FIJ)	1	2	4	4	4	4	4	5	5	5	6	6	6	6	7	9	9	10	10	12	12	12	12
Sunil Bahadur (IND)	0	0	0	2	3	4	5	5	7	9	9	10	14	15	15	15	16	16	19	19	20	21	21
Report

=== Section C ===
Rank	Team	MP	MW	MT	ML	For	Ag	PD	Pts
1	Shannon McIlroy (NZL)	6	5	0	1	124	73	51	15
2	Martin McHugh (NIR)	6	5	0	1	112	83	29	15
3	Malcolm De Sousa (JER)	6	4	0	2	105	102	3	12
4	Leonard Callus (MLT)	6	3	0	3	93	107	-14	9
5	Peter Juni (PNG)	6	2	0	4	103	104	-1	6
6	John Christian (NFI)	6	1	0	5	93	125	-32	3
7	Petelo Gabriel (SAM)	6	1	0	5	83	119	-36	3

27 July, 17:30
Name	1	2	3	4	5	6	7	8	9	10	11	12	13	14	15	16	17	18	19	20	21	22	Final
Shannon McIlroy (NZL)	0	0	1	2	3	4	5	6	8	9	10	10	10	10	11	14	14	17	18	18	20	21	21
Petelo Gabriel (SAM)	1	2	2	2	2	2	2	2	2	2	2	4	5	6	6	6	8	8	8	10	10	10	10
Report

27 July, 17:30
Name	1	2	3	4	5	6	7	8	9	10	11	12	13	14	15	16	17	18	19	20	21	22	23	Final
Malcolm De Sousa (JER)	0	0	0	0	0	0	2	5	7	7	8	11	12	12	16	16	16	17	17	18	19	19	21	21
Leonard Callus (MLT)	1	4	5	6	7	8	8	8	8	9	9	9	9	10	10	12	14	14	15	15	15	18	18	18
Report

27 July, 17:30
Name	1	2	3	4	5	6	7	8	9	10	11	12	13	14	15	16	17	18	19	20	21	22	23	24	Final
Martin McHugh (NIR)	3	3	5	6	6	6	7	7	7	10	12	12	13	13	14	15	15	16	17	19	19	20	20	21	21
Peter Juni (PNG)	0	2	2	2	5	6	6	8	9	9	9	10	10	12	12	12	14	14	14	14	15	15	18	18	18
Report

28 July, 17:45
Name	1	2	3	4	5	6	7	8	9	10	11	12	13	14	15	Final
Shannon McIlroy (NZL)	1	2	2	2	6	7	9	9	12	13	13	15	17	19	21	21
Martin McHugh (NIR)	0	0	1	2	2	2	2	4	4	4	7	7	7	7	7	7
Report

28 July, 17:45
Name	1	2	3	4	5	6	7	8	9	10	11	12	13	14	15	16	17	18	Final
Malcolm De Sousa (JER)	0	1	2	2	4	4	6	6	7	10	12	14	14	16	20	20	20	21	21
John Christian (NFI)	1	1	1	4	4	7	7	8	8	8	8	8	9	9	9	10	12	12	12
Report

28 July, 17:45
Name	1	2	3	4	5	6	7	8	9	10	11	12	13	14	15	16	Final
Petelo Gabriel (SAM)	2	2	2	3	3	3	3	3	4	5	5	6	6	8	8	8	8
Peter Juni (PNG)	0	2	5	5	7	9	10	12	12	12	14	14	15	15	18	21	21
Report

29 July, 08:45
Name	1	2	3	4	5	6	7	8	9	10	11	12	13	14	15	16	17	18	19	20	21	22	23	Final
Shannon McIlroy (NZL)	2	3	4	6	6	6	9	9	9	11	13	13	13	13	14	14	14	15	17	18	18	21	21	21
Peter Juni (PNG)	0	0	0	0	1	3	3	4	5	6	6	7	9	10	10	11	12	12	12	12	13	13	13	13
Report

29 July, 08:45
Name	1	2	3	4	5	6	7	8	9	10	11	12	13	14	15	16	17	18	19	Final
Martin McHugh (NIR)	2	2	2	3	3	5	7	10	10	10	11	13	14	14	17	18	18	20	21	21
Petelo Gabriel (SAM)	0	3	5	5	6	6	6	6	7	8	8	8	8	10	10	10	13	13	13	13
Report

29 July, 08:45
Name	1	2	3	4	5	6	7	8	9	10	11	12	13	14	15	16	17	18	19	20	21	22	Final
John Christian (NFI)	0	0	0	0	1	2	2	2	2	3	5	5	5	6	6	6	9	9	11	14	14	14	14
Leonard Callus (MLT)	1	2	3	4	4	4	7	8	9	9	9	11	13	13	14	16	16	17	17	17	19	21	21
Report

29 July, 15:45
Name	1	2	3	4	5	6	7	8	9	10	11	Final
Shannon McIlroy (NZL)	0	3	3	6	7	10	12	13	16	19	21	21
Leonard Callus (MLT)	1	1	2	2	2	2	2	2	2	2	2	2
Report

29 July, 15:45
Name	1	2	3	4	5	6	7	8	9	10	11	12	13	14	15	16	17	18	19	20	21	22	23	24	25	Final
Malcolm De Sousa (JER)	1	1	1	2	2	4	4	5	5	7	7	8	8	9	9	9	9	9	11	12	12	12	12	12	12	12
Peter Juni (PNG)	0	1	2	2	3	3	4	4	6	6	7	7	9	9	11	12	13	14	14	14	15	17	18	19	21	21
Report

29 July, 15:45
Name	1	2	3	4	5	6	7	8	9	10	11	12	13	14	15	16	17	18	19	20	21	22	23	24	Final
John Christian (NFI)	0	1	4	5	5	5	5	5	6	7	7	7	8	9	10	10	10	10	11	11	11	12	14	14	14
Petelo Gabriel (SAM)	4	4	4	4	5	6	7	8	8	8	9	10	10	10	10	11	14	16	16	17	20	20	20	21	21
Report

30 July, 08:45
Name	1	2	3	4	5	6	7	8	9	10	11	12	13	14	15	16	17	18	19	20	21	22	23	24	25	26	27	Final
Shannon McIlroy (NZL)	0	0	0	1	1	2	2	3	3	4	5	6	6	7	8	10	10	11	11	14	14	15	15	15	18	18	21	21
John Christian (NFI)	1	4	5	5	8	8	9	9	11	11	11	11	13	13	13	13	14	14	15	15	16	16	18	19	19	20	20	20
Report

30 July, 08:45
Name	1	2	3	4	5	6	7	8	9	10	11	12	13	14	15	16	17	18	Final
Malcolm De Sousa (JER)	1	1	2	3	3	3	4	4	5	5	5	5	7	7	9	9	9	9	9
Martin McHugh (NIR)	0	3	3	3	6	7	7	10	10	11	12	14	14	16	16	18	20	21	21
Report

30 July, 08:45
Name	1	2	3	4	5	6	7	8	9	10	11	12	13	14	15	16	17	18	19	20	Final
Leonard Callus (MLT)	1	3	4	6	6	6	7	7	9	10	12	12	15	16	17	17	17	18	20	21	21
Peter Juni (PNG)	0	0	0	0	2	3	3	5	5	5	5	6	6	6	6	8	10	10	10	10	10
Report

30 July, 11:45
Name	1	2	3	4	5	6	7	8	9	10	11	12	13	14	15	16	17	18	19	20	21	Final
Malcolm De Sousa (JER)	2	3	4	5	5	5	8	8	8	8	8	11	13	13	14	17	17	18	18	19	21	21
Petelo Gabriel (SAM)	0	0	0	0	1	3	3	4	5	6	7	7	7	9	9	9	10	10	11	11	11	11
Report

30 July, 11:45
Name	1	2	3	4	5	6	7	8	9	10	11	12	13	14	15	16	17	18	Final
Martin McHugh (NIR)	1	2	2	2	4	5	5	7	10	11	15	15	17	17	17	19	20	21	21
Leonard Callus (MLT)	0	0	1	3	3	3	5	5	5	5	5	6	6	9	10	10	10	10	10
Report

30 July, 11:45
Name	1	2	3	4	5	6	7	8	9	10	11	12	13	14	15	16	17	18	19	20	21	22	23	24	Final
John Christian (NFI)	0	0	1	1	2	3	4	6	6	6	8	8	9	10	10	11	11	11	13	16	16	16	20	21	21
Peter Juni (PNG)	1	3	3	5	5	5	5	5	7	11	11	12	12	12	15	15	16	18	18	18	19	20	20	20	20
Report

30 July, 15:45
Name	1	2	3	4	5	6	7	8	9	10	11	12	13	14	15	16	17	18	19	20	21	22	23	24	25	26	Final
Shannon McIlroy (NZL)	0	1	1	1	2	2	3	3	3	3	6	7	8	9	10	13	15	16	16	17	17	17	18	19	19	19	19
Malcolm De Sousa (JER)	2	2	5	6	6	7	7	9	11	13	13	13	13	13	13	13	13	13	14	14	15	17	17	17	19	21	21
Report

30 July, 15:45
Name	1	2	3	4	5	6	7	8	9	10	11	12	13	14	15	16	17	18	Final
Martin McHugh (NIR)	1	2	4	5	5	8	10	12	12	13	13	15	15	15	15	18	18	21	21
John Christian (NFI)	0	0	0	0	2	2	2	2	3	3	4	4	6	7	10	10	12	12	12
Report

30 July, 15:45
Name	1	2	3	4	5	6	7	8	9	10	11	12	13	14	15	16	17	18	19	20	21	22	23	24	25	26	27	Final
Petelo Gabriel (SAM)	0	2	3	3	4	4	4	8	8	9	9	12	13	14	14	14	14	15	16	16	16	16	18	18	18	20	20	20
Leonard Callus (MLT)	1	1	1	2	2	3	4	4	6	6	7	7	7	7	8	9	10	10	10	14	15	17	17	18	19	19	21	21
Report

=== Section D ===
Rank	Team	MP	MW	MT	ML	For	Ag	PD	Pts
1	Darren Burnett (SCO)	5	4	0	1	103	50	53	12
2	Harry Musonda (ZAM)	5	3	0	2	92	73	19	9
3	Willem Esterhuizen (NAM)	5	3	0	2	91	86	5	9
4	Munokokura Pita (COK)	5	2	0	3	68	81	-13	6
5	Matt Le Ber (GUE)	5	2	0	3	77	97	-20	6
6	Bobby Donnelly (RSA)	5	1	0	4	54	98	-44	3

27 July, 17:30
Name	1	2	3	4	5	6	7	8	9	10	11	12	13	14	15	Final
Bobby Donnelly (RSA)	0	0	1	2	4	4	7	7	7	7	7	7	7	10	10	10
Harry Musonda (ZAM)	2	3	3	3	3	5	5	8	12	16	17	18	20	20	21	21
Report

27 July, 17:30
Name	1	2	3	4	5	6	7	Final
Darren Burnett (SCO)	4	6	8	11	13	17	21	21
Munokokura Pita (COK)	0	0	0	0	0	0	0	0
Report

27 July, 17:30
Name	1	2	3	4	5	6	7	8	9	10	11	12	13	14	15	16	17	18	Final
Willem Esterhuizen (NAM)	2	5	5	7	8	8	9	9	11	11	14	14	16	16	17	20	20	21	21
Matt Le Ber (GUE)	0	0	1	1	1	2	2	4	4	5	5	6	6	8	8	8	9	9	9
Report

28 July, 17:45
Name	1	2	3	4	5	6	7	8	9	10	11	12	13	14	15	16	17	18	19	20	Final
Bobby Donnelly (RSA)	0	0	0	4	4	8	8	8	9	9	10	12	12	12	14	14	15	15	16	16	16
Willem Esterhuizen (NAM)	1	3	4	4	7	7	9	12	12	15	15	15	16	18	18	19	19	20	20	21	21
Report

28 July, 17:45
Name	1	2	3	4	5	6	7	8	9	10	11	12	13	14	15	16	17	18	19	20	21	22	23	Final
Harry Musonda (ZAM)	2	3	6	6	6	7	7	7	9	11	12	12	12	12	15	15	15	17	17	17	18	18	18	18
Matt Le Ber (GUE)	0	0	0	3	4	4	6	8	8	8	8	9	11	14	14	16	17	17	18	19	19	20	21	21
Report

29 July, 08:45
Name	1	2	3	4	5	6	7	8	9	10	11	12	13	14	15	16	17	18	19	20	21	Final
Bobby Donnelly (RSA)	1	1	4	4	6	7	7	10	10	11	12	12	12	12	12	13	15	16	16	20	21	21
Matt Le Ber (GUE)	0	1	1	3	3	3	4	4	5	5	5	6	7	8	11	11	11	11	14	14	14	14
Report

29 July, 08:45
Name	1	2	3	4	5	6	7	8	9	10	11	12	13	14	15	16	17	18	Final
Willem Esterhuizen (NAM)	3	3	7	7	8	8	10	10	10	10	10	10	10	10	10	10	11	11	11
Harry Musonda (ZAM)	0	2	2	4	4	5	5	7	8	9	11	14	16	17	19	20	20	21	21
Report

29 July, 15:45
Name	1	2	3	4	5	6	7	8	9	10	11	12	Final
Bobby Donnelly (RSA)	0	0	0	0	0	0	0	0	1	1	1	1	1
Munokokura Pita (COK)	2	3	5	6	8	11	12	14	14	15	19	21	21
Report

29 July, 15:45
Name	1	2	3	4	5	6	7	8	9	10	11	12	13	14	15	16	17	18	19	20	21	Final
Darren Burnett (SCO)	2	3	3	4	5	5	5	5	7	9	10	13	14	16	16	16	18	19	19	19	21	21
Matt Le Ber (GUE)	0	0	1	1	1	3	6	7	7	7	7	7	7	7	8	9	9	9	9	12	12	12
Report

30 July, 08:45
Name	1	2	3	4	5	6	7	8	9	10	11	12	13	14	15	16	17	18	19	20	21	22	23	24	25	26	Final
Darren Burnett (SCO)	1	1	1	1	4	4	4	4	6	6	6	6	7	8	8	11	12	13	17	17	17	17	18	19	19	19	19
Willem Esterhuizen (NAM)	0	1	3	4	4	5	7	8	8	9	10	12	12	12	13	13	13	13	13	14	15	16	16	16	20	21	21
Report

30 July, 08:45
Name	1	2	3	4	5	6	7	8	9	10	11	12	13	14	15	16	17	18	19	20	21	22	23	24	25	26	Final
Munokokura Pita (COK)	0	0	0	1	2	2	3	3	4	5	8	8	8	9	9	10	12	12	12	13	13	13	15	16	16	16	16
Matt Le Ber (GUE)	1	2	4	4	4	5	5	7	7	7	7	8	9	9	11	11	11	14	16	16	18	19	19	19	20	21	21
Report

30 July, 11:45
Name	1	2	3	4	5	6	7	8	9	10	11	12	13	14	15	16	17	18	Final
Darren Burnett (SCO)	3	6	7	7	7	9	9	10	14	16	16	17	17	18	18	18	20	21	21
Harry Musonda (ZAM)	0	0	0	1	2	2	4	4	4	4	6	6	8	8	10	11	11	11	11
Report

30 July, 11:45
Name	1	2	3	4	5	6	7	8	9	10	11	12	13	14	15	16	17	18	19	20	21	22	Final
Willem Esterhuizen (NAM)	1	1	1	3	3	3	3	3	3	4	6	8	8	10	10	11	12	12	14	17	17	17	17
Munokokura Pita (COK)	0	1	2	2	4	5	6	8	11	11	11	11	12	12	13	13	13	16	16	16	18	21	21
Report

30 July, 15:45
Name	1	2	3	4	5	6	7	8	9	10	11	12	13	14	15	16	17	18	19	Final
Bobby Donnelly (RSA)	0	0	0	0	0	0	0	2	2	2	2	3	3	4	4	5	5	6	6	6
Darren Burnett (SCO)	1	3	4	5	6	7	8	8	9	13	14	14	18	18	19	19	20	20	21	21
Report

30 July, 15:45
Name	1	2	3	4	5	6	7	8	9	10	11	12	13	14	15	16	Final
Harry Musonda (ZAM)	1	3	3	5	5	5	6	8	10	12	12	14	15	17	18	21	21
Munokokura Pita (COK)	0	0	1	1	5	9	9	9	9	9	10	10	10	10	10	10	10
Report

== Knockout stage ==
Quarterfinals
A1	Aron Sherriff (AUS)	21
B2	Muhammad Hizlee Abdul Rais (MAS)	19
D1	Darren Burnett (SCO)	21
C2	Martin McHugh (NIR)	20
B1	Ryan Bester (CAN)	21
D2	Harry Musonda (ZAM)	5
C1	Shannon McIlroy (NZL)	21
A2	Sam Tolchard (ENG)	12

Semifinals
A1	Aron Sherriff (AUS)	15
D1	Darren Burnett (SCO)	21
B1	Ryan Bester (CAN)	21
C1	Shannon McIlroy (NZL)	10

Finals
D1	Darren Burnett (SCO)	21
B1	Ryan Bester (CAN)	9
Third place
A1	Aron Sherriff (AUS)	21
C1	Shannon McIlroy (NZL)	8

=== Quarterfinals ===
31 July, 08:45
Name	1	2	3	4	5	6	7	8	9	10	11	12	13	14	15	16	17	18	19	20	21	22	23	24	Final
Aron Sherriff (AUS)	0	0	0	0	2	2	2	3	4	6	7	7	7	8	10	10	10	12	12	14	16	18	20	21	21
Muhammad Hizlee Abdul Rais (MAS)	1	2	3	5	5	6	9	9	9	9	9	12	15	15	15	16	18	18	19	19	19	19	19	19	19
Report

31 July, 08:45
Name	1	2	3	4	5	6	7	8	9	10	11	12	13	14	Final
Ryan Bester (CAN)	0	1	4	5	7	7	7	7	9	11	15	18	20	21	21
Harry Musonda (ZAM)	1	1	1	1	1	3	4	5	5	5	5	5	5	5	5
Report

31 July, 08:45
Name	1	2	3	4	5	6	7	8	9	10	11	12	13	14	15	16	17	18	19	20	21	Final
Shannon McIlroy (NZL)	2	3	3	4	5	5	6	6	6	8	8	11	11	11	14	16	16	17	17	20	21	21
Sam Tolchard (ENG)	0	0	1	1	1	3	3	4	5	5	7	7	9	10	10	10	11	11	12	12	12	12
Report

31 July, 08:45
Name	1	2	3	4	5	6	7	8	9	10	11	12	13	14	15	16	17	18	19	20	21	22	23	24	25	26	27	Final
Darren Burnett (SCO)	0	0	0	2	4	4	5	5	5	5	5	6	6	7	9	13	14	15	16	16	16	16	16	17	19	20	21	21
Martin McHugh (NIR)	2	4	6	6	6	7	7	8	9	10	11	11	13	13	13	13	13	13	13	15	17	18	20	20	20	20	20	20
Report

=== Semifinals ===
31 July, 12:45
Name	1	2	3	4	5	6	7	8	9	10	11	12	13	14	15	16	17	18	19	20	21	22	23	24	25	Final
Aron Sherriff (AUS)	2	3	4	4	5	5	5	5	5	5	6	8	9	9	12	12	13	13	13	15	15	15	15	15	15	15
Darren Burnett (SCO)	0	0	0	1	1	2	3	6	7	8	8	8	8	9	9	11	11	13	15	15	16	17	18	20	21	21
Report

31 July, 12:45
Name	1	2	3	4	5	6	7	8	9	10	11	12	13	14	15	16	17	18	19	20	21	22	Final
Ryan Bester (CAN)	1	2	2	4	4	6	6	8	8	9	10	13	15	15	16	16	17	18	19	19	20	21	21
Shannon McIlroy (NZL)	0	0	1	1	2	2	4	4	5	5	5	5	5	6	6	7	7	7	7	10	10	10	10
Report

=== Finals ===
==== Gold medal match ====
01 August, 17:45
Rank	Name	1	2	3	4	5	6	7	8	9	10	11	12	13	14	15	16	17	18	19	Final
1st place, gold medalist(s)	Darren Burnett (SCO)	0	0	0	1	5	8	10	10	12	13	13	13	14	14	14	17	18	20	21	21
2nd place, silver medalist(s)	Ryan Bester (CAN)	1	2	3	3	3	3	3	5	5	5	6	7	7	8	9	9	9	9	9	9
Report

==== Bronze medal match ====
01 August, 17:45
Rank	Name	1	2	3	4	5	6	7	8	9	10	11	12	13	14	15	16	17	18	19	Final
3rd place, bronze medalist(s)	Aron Sherriff (AUS)	0	2	3	4	6	7	11	12	13	13	15	16	16	17	17	17	18	18	21	21
4	Shannon McIlroy (NZL)	1	1	1	1	1	1	1	1	1	2	2	2	4	4	5	6	6	8	8	8
Report
