= Lawn bowls at the 2014 Commonwealth Games – Men's pairs =

Bowls event

Lawn bowls – Men's pairs at the 2014 Commonwealth Games
- Venue: Kelvingrove Lawn Bowls Centre
- Dates: 24–28 July 2014
- Competitors: 60 from 20 nations

Medalists
| gold medal | Paul Foster; Alex Marshall | Scotland |
| silver medal | Muhammad Hizlee Abdul Rais; Fairul Izwan Abd Muin | Malaysia |
| bronze medal | Andrew Knapper; Sam Tolchard | England |

The Men's pair at the 2014 Commonwealth Games, was part of the lawn bowls competition, which took place between 24 and 28 July 2014 at the Kelvingrove Lawn Bowls Centre. Scotland's Paul Foster and Alex Marshall won the gold medal, defeating Muhammad Hizlee Abdul Rais and Fairul Izwan Abd Muin of Malaysia in the final. Andrew Knapper and Sam Tolchard from England won the bronze medal.

== Sectional play ==
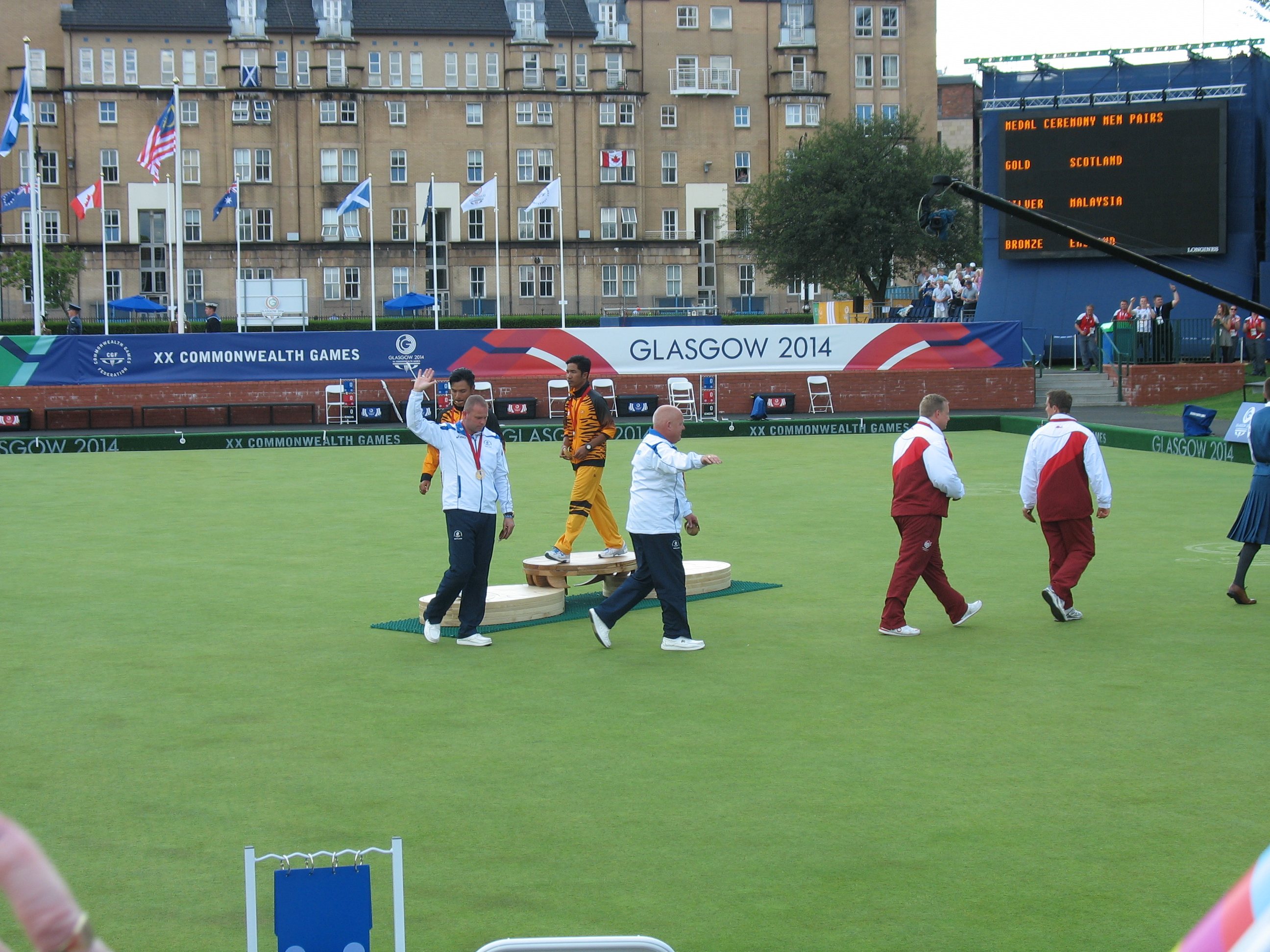
Paul Foster and Alex Marshall at the medal ceremony

=== Section A ===
| Rank | Nation | Team | MP | MW | MT | ML | For | Ag | PD | Pts |
|---|---|---|---|---|---|---|---|---|---|---|
| 1 | Scotland | Paul Foster & Alex Marshall | 4 | 4 | 0 | 0 | 81 | 37 | +44 | 12 |
| 2 | New Zealand | Blake Signal & Richard Girvan | 4 | 3 | 0 | 1 | 66 | 48 | +18 | 9 |
| 3 | South Africa | Gerry Baker & Jason Evans | 4 | 2 | 0 | 2 | 78 | 46 | +32 | 6 |
| 4 | Zambia | Harry Musonda & Christe Kapata | 4 | 1 | 0 | 3 | 41 | 92 | -51 | 3 |
| 5 | Niue | Frederick Tafatu & Dalton Tagelagi | 4 | 0 | 0 | 4 | 35 | 78 | -43 | 0 |

24 July, 11:45
| Team | 1 | 2 | 3 | 4 | 5 | 6 | 7 | 8 | 9 | 10 | 11 | 12 | 13 | 14 | 15 | 16 | 17 | 18 | Final |
|---|---|---|---|---|---|---|---|---|---|---|---|---|---|---|---|---|---|---|---|
| Scotland | 1 | 1 | 2 | 5 | 6 | 7 | 8 | 9 | 12 | 13 | 14 | 15 | 15 | 15 | 19 | 20 | 21 | 25 | 25 |
| Zambia | 0 | 2 | 2 | 2 | 2 | 2 | 2 | 2 | 2 | 2 | 2 | 2 | 3 | 4 | 4 | 4 | 4 | 4 | 4 |
Report

24 July, 11:45
| Team | 1 | 2 | 3 | 4 | 5 | 6 | 7 | 8 | 9 | 10 | 11 | 12 | 13 | 14 | 15 | 16 | 17 | 18 | Final |
|---|---|---|---|---|---|---|---|---|---|---|---|---|---|---|---|---|---|---|---|
| New Zealand | 0 | 0 | 2 | 3 | 4 | 6 | 6 | 8 | 9 | 9 | 11 | 11 | 12 | 13 | 13 | 14 | 14 | 14 | 14 |
| Niue | 1 | 2 | 2 | 2 | 2 | 2 | 3 | 3 | 3 | 4 | 4 | 5 | 5 | 5 | 7 | 7 | 10 | 11 | 11 |
Report

24 July, 18:45
| Team | 1 | 2 | 3 | 4 | 5 | 6 | 7 | 8 | 9 | 10 | 11 | 12 | 13 | 14 | 15 | 16 | 17 | 18 | Final |
|---|---|---|---|---|---|---|---|---|---|---|---|---|---|---|---|---|---|---|---|
| New Zealand | 0 | 1 | 2 | 4 | 4 | 4 | 4 | 5 | 7 | 8 | 9 | 9 | 10 | 12 | 13 | 14 | 15 | 16 | 16 |
| South Africa | 2 | 2 | 2 | 2 | 3 | 5 | 6 | 6 | 6 | 6 | 6 | 8 | 8 | 8 | 8 | 8 | 8 | 8 | 8 |
Report

24 July, 18:45
| Team | 1 | 2 | 3 | 4 | 5 | 6 | 7 | 8 | 9 | 10 | 11 | 12 | 13 | 14 | 15 | 16 | 17 | 18 | Final |
|---|---|---|---|---|---|---|---|---|---|---|---|---|---|---|---|---|---|---|---|
| Niue | 3 | 3 | 3 | 3 | 3 | 4 | 6 | 7 | 7 | 8 | 9 | 9 | 9 | 9 | 9 | 10 | 10 | 12 | 12 |
| Zambia | 0 | 2 | 4 | 6 | 7 | 7 | 7 | 7 | 9 | 9 | 9 | 10 | 11 | 13 | 17 | 17 | 18 | 18 | 18 |
Report

25 July, 11:45
| Team | 1 | 2 | 3 | 4 | 5 | 6 | 7 | 8 | 9 | 10 | 11 | 12 | 13 | 14 | 15 | 16 | 17 | 18 | Final |
|---|---|---|---|---|---|---|---|---|---|---|---|---|---|---|---|---|---|---|---|
| Scotland | 0 | 0 | 0 | 1 | 3 | 6 | 8 | 9 | 11 | 11 | 14 | 14 | 14 | 14 | 15 | 17 | 19 | 21 | 21 |
| Niue | 1 | 2 | 3 | 3 | 3 | 3 | 3 | 3 | 3 | 4 | 4 | 5 | 6 | 7 | 7 | 7 | 7 | 7 | 7 |
Report

25 July, 11:45
| Team | 1 | 2 | 3 | 4 | 5 | 6 | 7 | 8 | 9 | 10 | 11 | 12 | 13 | 14 | 15 | 16 | 17 | 18 | Final |
|---|---|---|---|---|---|---|---|---|---|---|---|---|---|---|---|---|---|---|---|
| South Africa | 2 | 5 | 5 | 11 | 11 | 11 | 12 | 16 | 19 | 22 | 22 | 23 | 23 | 23 | 23 | 25 | 28 | 30 | 30 |
| Zambia | 0 | 0 | 1 | 1 | 3 | 4 | 4 | 4 | 4 | 4 | 6 | 6 | 7 | 8 | 9 | 9 | 9 | 9 | 9 |
Report

25 July, 18:45
| Team | 1 | 2 | 3 | 4 | 5 | 6 | 7 | 8 | 9 | 10 | 11 | 12 | 13 | 14 | 15 | 16 | 17 | 18 | Final |
|---|---|---|---|---|---|---|---|---|---|---|---|---|---|---|---|---|---|---|---|
| Scotland | 0 | 2 | 3 | 3 | 3 | 4 | 4 | 6 | 6 | 6 | 6 | 6 | 7 | 7 | 7 | 10 | 11 | 16 | 16 |
| South Africa | 1 | 1 | 1 | 3 | 5 | 5 | 6 | 6 | 8 | 10 | 11 | 12 | 12 | 14 | 15 | 15 | 15 | 15 | 15 |
Report

25 July, 18:45
| Team | 1 | 2 | 3 | 4 | 5 | 6 | 7 | 8 | 9 | 10 | 11 | 12 | 13 | 14 | 15 | 16 | 17 | 18 | Final |
|---|---|---|---|---|---|---|---|---|---|---|---|---|---|---|---|---|---|---|---|
| New Zealand | 0 | 0 | 2 | 2 | 6 | 7 | 8 | 8 | 10 | 11 | 13 | 13 | 16 | 16 | 18 | 20 | 22 | 25 | 25 |
| Zambia | 2 | 3 | 3 | 5 | 5 | 5 | 5 | 7 | 7 | 7 | 7 | 8 | 8 | 10 | 10 | 10 | 10 | 10 | 10 |
Report

26 July, 11:45
| Team | 1 | 2 | 3 | 4 | 5 | 6 | 7 | 8 | 9 | 10 | 11 | 12 | 13 | 14 | 15 | 16 | 17 | 18 | Final |
|---|---|---|---|---|---|---|---|---|---|---|---|---|---|---|---|---|---|---|---|
| Scotland | 0 | 1 | 2 | 2 | 2 | 4 | 5 | 7 | 9 | 9 | 13 | 13 | 16 | 16 | 16 | 16 | 18 | 19 | 19 |
| New Zealand | 1 | 1 | 1 | 2 | 3 | 3 | 3 | 3 | 3 | 4 | 4 | 7 | 7 | 8 | 9 | 11 | 11 | 11 | 11 |
Report

26 July, 11:45
| Team | 1 | 2 | 3 | 4 | 5 | 6 | 7 | 8 | 9 | 10 | 11 | 12 | 13 | 14 | 15 | 16 | 17 | 18 | Final |
|---|---|---|---|---|---|---|---|---|---|---|---|---|---|---|---|---|---|---|---|
| South Africa | 0 | 0 | 0 | 1 | 2 | 7 | 9 | 10 | 11 | 13 | 17 | 18 | 19 | 19 | 19 | 20 | 24 | 25 | 25 |
| Niue | 1 | 2 | 3 | 3 | 3 | 3 | 3 | 3 | 3 | 3 | 3 | 3 | 3 | 4 | 5 | 5 | 5 | 5 | 5 |
Report

=== Section B ===
| Rank | Nation | Team | MP | MW | MT | ML | For | Ag | PD | Pts |
|---|---|---|---|---|---|---|---|---|---|---|
| 1 | Australia | Brett Wilkie & Aron Sherriff | 4 | 4 | 0 | 0 | 84 | 38 | +46 | 12 |
| 2 | Namibia | Douw Calitz & Willem Esterhuizen | 4 | 3 | 0 | 1 | 66 | 61 | +5 | 9 |
| 3 | Norfolk Island | John Christian & Tim Sheridan | 4 | 2 | 0 | 2 | 62 | 56 | +6 | 6 |
| 4 | Jersey | Malcolm De Sousa & Thomas Greechan | 4 | 1 | 0 | 3 | 57 | 64 | -7 | 3 |
| 5 | Cook Islands | Munokokura Pita & Tuatiaki Papatua | 4 | 0 | 0 | 4 | 46 | 96 | -50 | 0 |

24 July, 11:45
| Team | 1 | 2 | 3 | 4 | 5 | 6 | 7 | 8 | 9 | 10 | 11 | 12 | 13 | 14 | 15 | 16 | 17 | 18 | Final |
|---|---|---|---|---|---|---|---|---|---|---|---|---|---|---|---|---|---|---|---|
| Australia | 0 | 0 | 3 | 7 | 7 | 8 | 13 | 14 | 14 | 16 | 16 | 21 | 21 | 22 | 22 | 23 | 23 | 25 | 25 |
| Cook Islands | 1 | 2 | 2 | 2 | 3 | 3 | 3 | 3 | 6 | 6 | 7 | 7 | 8 | 8 | 10 | 10 | 11 | 11 | 11 |
Report

24 July, 11:45
| Team | 1 | 2 | 3 | 4 | 5 | 6 | 7 | 8 | 9 | 10 | 11 | 12 | 13 | 14 | 15 | 16 | 17 | 18 | Final |
|---|---|---|---|---|---|---|---|---|---|---|---|---|---|---|---|---|---|---|---|
| Namibia | 3 | 5 | 5 | 5 | 6 | 6 | 7 | 9 | 11 | 14 | 15 | 15 | 16 | 19 | 19 | 19 | 20 | 20 | 20 |
| Norfolk Island | 0 | 0 | 1 | 3 | 3 | 4 | 4 | 4 | 4 | 4 | 4 | 5 | 5 | 5 | 7 | 8 | 8 | 9 | 9 |
Report

24 July, 18:45
| Team | 1 | 2 | 3 | 4 | 5 | 6 | 7 | 8 | 9 | 10 | 11 | 12 | 13 | 14 | 15 | 16 | 17 | 18 | Final |
|---|---|---|---|---|---|---|---|---|---|---|---|---|---|---|---|---|---|---|---|
| Namibia | 1 | 1 | 1 | 4 | 5 | 6 | 6 | 9 | 9 | 9 | 9 | 9 | 11 | 11 | 12 | 13 | 14 | 15 | 15 |
| Jersey | 0 | 1 | 2 | 2 | 2 | 2 | 3 | 3 | 6 | 7 | 8 | 9 | 9 | 14 | 14 | 14 | 14 | 14 | 14 |
Report

24 July, 18:45
| Team | 1 | 2 | 3 | 4 | 5 | 6 | 7 | 8 | 9 | 10 | 11 | 12 | 13 | 14 | 15 | 16 | 17 | 18 | Final |
|---|---|---|---|---|---|---|---|---|---|---|---|---|---|---|---|---|---|---|---|
| Norfolk Island | 1 | 1 | 6 | 6 | 8 | 9 | 14 | 15 | 15 | 15 | 15 | 15 | 15 | 18 | 20 | 22 | 23 | 26 | 26 |
| Cook Islands | 0 | 1 | 1 | 2 | 2 | 2 | 2 | 2 | 4 | 5 | 7 | 9 | 10 | 10 | 10 | 10 | 10 | 10 | 10 |
Report

25 July, 11:45
| Team | 1 | 2 | 3 | 4 | 5 | 6 | 7 | 8 | 9 | 10 | 11 | 12 | 13 | 14 | 15 | 16 | 17 | 18 | Final |
|---|---|---|---|---|---|---|---|---|---|---|---|---|---|---|---|---|---|---|---|
| Australia | 3 | 3 | 3 | 4 | 4 | 4 | 5 | 5 | 7 | 7 | 8 | 8 | 9 | 9 | 10 | 12 | 14 | 14 | 14 |
| Norfolk Island | 0 | 1 | 2 | 2 | 3 | 4 | 4 | 5 | 5 | 6 | 6 | 7 | 7 | 9 | 9 | 9 | 9 | 10 | 10 |
Report

25 July, 11:45
| Team | 1 | 2 | 3 | 4 | 5 | 6 | 7 | 8 | 9 | 10 | 11 | 12 | 13 | 14 | 15 | 16 | 17 | 18 | Final |
|---|---|---|---|---|---|---|---|---|---|---|---|---|---|---|---|---|---|---|---|
| Jersey | 0 | 0 | 0 | 0 | 1 | 1 | 1 | 5 | 7 | 9 | 11 | 11 | 12 | 13 | 17 | 20 | 22 | 24 | 24 |
| Cook Islands | 1 | 3 | 6 | 6 | 7 | 9 | 11 | 11 | 11 | 11 | 11 | 12 | 12 | 12 | 12 | 12 | 12 | 12 | 12 |
Report

25 July, 18:45
| Team | 1 | 2 | 3 | 4 | 5 | 6 | 7 | 8 | 9 | 10 | 11 | 12 | 13 | 14 | 15 | 16 | 17 | 18 | Final |
|---|---|---|---|---|---|---|---|---|---|---|---|---|---|---|---|---|---|---|---|
| Australia | 1 | 2 | 2 | 5 | 5 | 8 | 10 | 10 | 10 | 11 | 13 | 14 | 14 | 15 | 16 | 18 | 20 | 20 | 20 |
| Jersey | 0 | 0 | 1 | 1 | 2 | 2 | 2 | 4 | 5 | 5 | 5 | 5 | 6 | 6 | 6 | 6 | 6 | 7 | 7 |
Report

25 July, 18:45
| Team | 1 | 2 | 3 | 4 | 5 | 6 | 7 | 8 | 9 | 10 | 11 | 12 | 13 | 14 | 15 | 16 | 17 | 18 | Final |
|---|---|---|---|---|---|---|---|---|---|---|---|---|---|---|---|---|---|---|---|
| Namibia | 2 | 3 | 3 | 8 | 9 | 10 | 10 | 10 | 10 | 12 | 12 | 14 | 17 | 18 | 18 | 21 | 21 | 21 | 21 |
| Cook Islands | 0 | 0 | 1 | 1 | 1 | 1 | 3 | 4 | 6 | 6 | 8 | 8 | 8 | 8 | 10 | 10 | 12 | 13 | 13 |
Report

26 July, 11:45
| Team | 1 | 2 | 3 | 4 | 5 | 6 | 7 | 8 | 9 | 10 | 11 | 12 | 13 | 14 | 15 | 16 | 17 | 18 | Final |
|---|---|---|---|---|---|---|---|---|---|---|---|---|---|---|---|---|---|---|---|
| Australia | 3 | 3 | 5 | 6 | 9 | 9 | 13 | 15 | 16 | 16 | 20 | 23 | 23 | 23 | 23 | 24 | 24 | 25 | 25 |
| Namibia | 0 | 1 | 1 | 1 | 1 | 2 | 2 | 2 | 2 | 3 | 3 | 3 | 4 | 5 | 8 | 8 | 10 | 10 | 10 |
Report

26 July, 11:45
| Team | 1 | 2 | 3 | 4 | 5 | 6 | 7 | 8 | 9 | 10 | 11 | 12 | 13 | 14 | 15 | 16 | 17 | 18 | Final |
|---|---|---|---|---|---|---|---|---|---|---|---|---|---|---|---|---|---|---|---|
| Jersey | 0 | 0 | 0 | 1 | 1 | 2 | 3 | 3 | 7 | 7 | 10 | 11 | 11 | 11 | 11 | 12 | 12 | 12 | 12 |
| Norfolk Island | 1 | 2 | 3 | 3 | 6 | 6 | 6 | 8 | 8 | 9 | 9 | 9 | 10 | 11 | 12 | 12 | 15 | 17 | 17 |
Report

=== Section C ===
| Rank | Nation | Team | MP | MW | MT | ML | For | Ag | PD | Pts |
|---|---|---|---|---|---|---|---|---|---|---|
| 1 | Malaysia | Muhammad Hizlee Abdul Rais & Fairul Izwan Abd Muin | 5 | 4 | 0 | 1 | 94 | 57 | +37 | 12 |
| 2 | Northern Ireland | Martin McHugh & Ian McClure | 5 | 3 | 0 | 2 | 100 | 72 | +28 | 9 |
| 3 | Malta | John Borg & Leonard Callus | 5 | 3 | 0 | 2 | 78 | 84 | -6 | 9 |
| 4 | Papua New Guinea | Joe Morgan & Peter Juni | 5 | 2 | 0 | 3 | 70 | 71 | -1 | 6 |
| 5 | Canada | Ryan Bester & George Whitelaw | 5 | 2 | 0 | 3 | 65 | 86 | -21 | 6 |
| 6 | Samoa | Edward Bell & Petelo Gabriel | 5 | 1 | 0 | 4 | 60 | 97 | -37 | 3 |

24 July, 11:45
| Team | 1 | 2 | 3 | 4 | 5 | 6 | 7 | 8 | 9 | 10 | 11 | 12 | 13 | 14 | 15 | 16 | 17 | 18 | Final |
|---|---|---|---|---|---|---|---|---|---|---|---|---|---|---|---|---|---|---|---|
| Canada | 0 | 2 | 3 | 3 | 7 | 7 | 7 | 7 | 7 | 9 | 12 | 16 | 16 | 18 | 19 | 19 | 20 | 20 | 20 |
| Samoa | 2 | 2 | 2 | 3 | 3 | 7 | 8 | 9 | 10 | 10 | 10 | 10 | 11 | 11 | 11 | 13 | 13 | 15 | 15 |
Report

24 July, 11:45
| Team | 1 | 2 | 3 | 4 | 5 | 6 | 7 | 8 | 9 | 10 | 11 | 12 | 13 | 14 | 15 | 16 | 17 | Final |
|---|---|---|---|---|---|---|---|---|---|---|---|---|---|---|---|---|---|---|
| Northern Ireland | 0 | 1 | 1 | 2 | 2 | 5 | 6 | 6 | 6 | 10 | 13 | 14 | 15 | 15 | 16 | 16 | 16 | 16 |
| Malta | 2 | 2 | 3 | 3 | 4 | 4 | 4 | 5 | 8 | 8 | 8 | 8 | 8 | 12 | 12 | 17 | 18 | 18 |
Report

24 July, 11:45
| Team | 1 | 2 | 3 | 4 | 5 | 6 | 7 | 8 | 9 | 10 | 11 | 12 | 13 | 14 | 15 | 16 | 17 | 18 | Final |
|---|---|---|---|---|---|---|---|---|---|---|---|---|---|---|---|---|---|---|---|
| Malaysia | 0 | 1 | 1 | 2 | 2 | 3 | 4 | 4 | 5 | 6 | 7 | 9 | 9 | 9 | 9 | 11 | 11 | 12 | 12 |
| Papua New Guinea | 2 | 2 | 3 | 3 | 4 | 4 | 4 | 5 | 5 | 5 | 5 | 5 | 6 | 7 | 10 | 10 | 11 | 11 | 11 |
Report

24 July, 18:45
| Team | 1 | 2 | 3 | 4 | 5 | 6 | 7 | 8 | 9 | 10 | 11 | 12 | 13 | 14 | 15 | 16 | 17 | 18 | Final |
|---|---|---|---|---|---|---|---|---|---|---|---|---|---|---|---|---|---|---|---|
| Canada | 0 | 0 | 1 | 1 | 1 | 2 | 3 | 4 | 5 | 5 | 5 | 7 | 7 | 7 | 7 | 8 | 10 | 10 | 10 |
| Papua New Guinea | 2 | 4 | 4 | 5 | 8 | 8 | 8 | 8 | 8 | 9 | 9 | 9 | 12 | 13 | 15 | 15 | 15 | 16 | 16 |
Report

24 July, 18:45
| Team | 1 | 2 | 3 | 4 | 5 | 6 | 7 | 8 | 9 | 10 | 11 | 12 | 13 | 14 | 15 | 16 | 17 | 18 | Final |
|---|---|---|---|---|---|---|---|---|---|---|---|---|---|---|---|---|---|---|---|
| Northern Ireland | 0 | 0 | 0 | 4 | 4 | 6 | 6 | 7 | 8 | 8 | 9 | 11 | 11 | 11 | 11 | 13 | 13 | 14 | 14 |
| Malaysia | 1 | 2 | 4 | 4 | 5 | 5 | 9 | 9 | 9 | 12 | 12 | 12 | 14 | 16 | 19 | 19 | 19 | 22 | 22 |
Report

24 July, 18:45
| Team | 1 | 2 | 3 | 4 | 5 | 6 | 7 | 8 | 9 | 10 | 11 | 12 | 13 | 14 | 15 | 16 | 17 | 18 | Final |
|---|---|---|---|---|---|---|---|---|---|---|---|---|---|---|---|---|---|---|---|
| Malta | 1 | 3 | 3 | 3 | 6 | 7 | 8 | 8 | 8 | 8 | 8 | 8 | 10 | 10 | 12 | 12 | 13 | 15 | 15 |
| Samoa | 0 | 0 | 2 | 3 | 3 | 3 | 3 | 4 | 8 | 9 | 11 | 14 | 14 | 17 | 17 | 18 | 18 | 18 | 18 |
Report

25 July, 11:45
| Team | 1 | 2 | 3 | 4 | 5 | 6 | 7 | 8 | 9 | 10 | 11 | 12 | 13 | 14 | 15 | 16 | 17 | 18 | Final |
|---|---|---|---|---|---|---|---|---|---|---|---|---|---|---|---|---|---|---|---|
| Canada | 0 | 1 | 1 | 2 | 2 | 2 | 2 | 2 | 2 | 4 | 4 | 4 | 5 | 5 | 6 | 6 | 6 | 6 | 6 |
| Malta | 1 | 1 | 5 | 5 | 6 | 7 | 8 | 9 | 10 | 10 | 11 | 13 | 13 | 15 | 15 | 17 | 19 | 20 | 20 |
Report

25 July, 11:45
| Team | 1 | 2 | 3 | 4 | 5 | 6 | 7 | 8 | 9 | 10 | 11 | 12 | 13 | 14 | 15 | 16 | 17 | 18 | Final |
|---|---|---|---|---|---|---|---|---|---|---|---|---|---|---|---|---|---|---|---|
| Northern Ireland | 0 | 0 | 2 | 5 | 8 | 9 | 9 | 11 | 11 | 12 | 13 | 14 | 14 | 14 | 15 | 16 | 19 | 19 | 19 |
| Papua New Guinea | 1 | 3 | 3 | 3 | 3 | 3 | 4 | 4 | 5 | 5 | 5 | 5 | 6 | 8 | 8 | 8 | 8 | 13 | 13 |
Report

25 July, 11:45
| Team | 1 | 2 | 3 | 4 | 5 | 6 | 7 | 8 | 9 | 10 | 11 | 12 | 13 | 14 | 15 | 16 | 17 | 18 | Final |
|---|---|---|---|---|---|---|---|---|---|---|---|---|---|---|---|---|---|---|---|
| Malaysia | 3 | 3 | 4 | 4 | 6 | 7 | 7 | 11 | 13 | 13 | 14 | 14 | 14 | 14 | 15 | 17 | 19 | 19 | 19 |
| Samoa | 0 | 2 | 2 | 3 | 3 | 3 | 4 | 4 | 4 | 6 | 6 | 7 | 8 | 10 | 10 | 10 | 10 | 11 | 11 |
Report

25 July, 18:45
| Team | 1 | 2 | 3 | 4 | 5 | 6 | 7 | 8 | 9 | 10 | 11 | 12 | 13 | 14 | 15 | 16 | 17 | 18 | Final |
|---|---|---|---|---|---|---|---|---|---|---|---|---|---|---|---|---|---|---|---|
| Canada | 0 | 0 | 0 | 2 | 5 | 6 | 7 | 8 | 10 | 10 | 10 | 11 | 11 | 11 | 11 | 11 | 12 | 14 | 14 |
| Malaysia | 1 | 2 | 3 | 3 | 3 | 3 | 3 | 3 | 3 | 5 | 7 | 7 | 8 | 10 | 11 | 13 | 13 | 13 | 13 |
Report

25 July, 18:45
| Team | 1 | 2 | 3 | 4 | 5 | 6 | 7 | 8 | 9 | 10 | 11 | 12 | 13 | 14 | 15 | 16 | 17 | 18 | Final |
|---|---|---|---|---|---|---|---|---|---|---|---|---|---|---|---|---|---|---|---|
| Northern Ireland | 0 | 4 | 6 | 6 | 11 | 12 | 13 | 14 | 16 | 17 | 17 | 18 | 18 | 21 | 24 | 25 | 27 | 29 | 29 |
| Samoa | 1 | 1 | 1 | 2 | 2 | 2 | 2 | 2 | 2 | 2 | 3 | 3 | 4 | 4 | 4 | 4 | 4 | 4 | 4 |
Report

25 July, 18:45
| Team | 1 | 2 | 3 | 4 | 5 | 6 | 7 | 8 | 9 | 10 | 11 | 12 | 13 | 14 | 15 | 16 | 17 | 18 | Final |
|---|---|---|---|---|---|---|---|---|---|---|---|---|---|---|---|---|---|---|---|
| Malta | 1 | 3 | 3 | 4 | 4 | 4 | 4 | 6 | 7 | 10 | 11 | 13 | 14 | 14 | 14 | 18 | 18 | 18 | 18 |
| Papua New Guinea | 0 | 0 | 2 | 2 | 3 | 5 | 7 | 7 | 7 | 7 | 7 | 7 | 7 | 10 | 11 | 11 | 15 | 16 | 16 |
Report

26 July, 11:45
| Team | 1 | 2 | 3 | 4 | 5 | 6 | 7 | 8 | 9 | 10 | 11 | 12 | 13 | 14 | 15 | 16 | 17 | 18 | Final |
|---|---|---|---|---|---|---|---|---|---|---|---|---|---|---|---|---|---|---|---|
| Canada | 0 | 0 | 2 | 5 | 6 | 7 | 7 | 7 | 7 | 7 | 9 | 13 | 13 | 14 | 15 | 15 | 15 | 15 | 15 |
| Northern Ireland | 3 | 5 | 5 | 5 | 5 | 5 | 8 | 10 | 11 | 13 | 13 | 13 | 17 | 17 | 17 | 18 | 20 | 22 | 22 |
Report

26 July, 11:45
| Team | 1 | 2 | 3 | 4 | 5 | 6 | 7 | 8 | 9 | 10 | 11 | 12 | 13 | 14 | 15 | 16 | 17 | 18 | Final |
|---|---|---|---|---|---|---|---|---|---|---|---|---|---|---|---|---|---|---|---|
| Malaysia | 3 | 7 | 7 | 7 | 10 | 13 | 16 | 16 | 16 | 18 | 18 | 19 | 22 | 22 | 22 | 26 | 27 | 28 | 28 |
| Malta | 0 | 0 | 1 | 2 | 2 | 2 | 2 | 3 | 4 | 4 | 5 | 5 | 5 | 6 | 7 | 7 | 7 | 7 | 7 |
Report

26 July, 11:45
| Team | 1 | 2 | 3 | 4 | 5 | 6 | 7 | 8 | 9 | 10 | 11 | 12 | 13 | 14 | 15 | 16 | 17 | 18 | Final |
|---|---|---|---|---|---|---|---|---|---|---|---|---|---|---|---|---|---|---|---|
| Samoa | 1 | 3 | 4 | 4 | 4 | 5 | 7 | 7 | 7 | 7 | 8 | 9 | 9 | 9 | 10 | 10 | 11 | 12 | 12 |
| Papua New Guinea | 0 | 0 | 0 | 2 | 3 | 3 | 3 | 7 | 9 | 11 | 11 | 11 | 12 | 13 | 13 | 14 | 14 | 14 | 14 |
Report

=== Section D ===
| Rank | Nation | Team | MP | MW | MT | ML | For | Ag | PD | Pts |
|---|---|---|---|---|---|---|---|---|---|---|
| 1 | England | Andrew Knapper & Sam Tolchard | 3 | 3 | 0 | 0 | 60 | 39 | +21 | 9 |
| 2 | Wales | Mark Harding & Robert Weale | 3 | 2 | 0 | 1 | 54 | 47 | +7 | 6 |
| 3 | India | Chandan Kumar Singh & Dinesh Kumar | 3 | 1 | 0 | 2 | 41 | 56 | -15 | 3 |
| 4 | Fiji | Arun Kumar & Samuela Tuikiligana | 3 | 0 | 0 | 3 | 40 | 53 | -13 | 0 |

24 July, 11:45
| Team | 1 | 2 | 3 | 4 | 5 | 6 | 7 | 8 | 9 | 10 | 11 | 12 | 13 | 14 | 15 | 16 | 17 | 18 | Final |
|---|---|---|---|---|---|---|---|---|---|---|---|---|---|---|---|---|---|---|---|
| England | 1 | 2 | 4 | 7 | 7 | 11 | 11 | 11 | 11 | 13 | 13 | 15 | 16 | 16 | 16 | 16 | 17 | 19 | 19 |
| India | 0 | 0 | 0 | 0 | 2 | 2 | 3 | 5 | 6 | 6 | 7 | 7 | 7 | 8 | 9 | 12 | 12 | 12 | 12 |
Report

24 July, 18:45
| Team | 1 | 2 | 3 | 4 | 5 | 6 | 7 | 8 | 9 | 10 | 11 | 12 | 13 | 14 | 15 | 16 | 17 | 18 | Final |
|---|---|---|---|---|---|---|---|---|---|---|---|---|---|---|---|---|---|---|---|
| Wales | 0 | 1 | 3 | 3 | 5 | 6 | 7 | 8 | 8 | 9 | 9 | 11 | 13 | 13 | 13 | 14 | 18 | 18 | 18 |
| Fiji | 5 | 5 | 5 | 6 | 6 | 6 | 6 | 6 | 7 | 7 | 8 | 8 | 8 | 9 | 11 | 11 | 11 | 12 | 12 |
Report

25 July, 11:45
| Team | 1 | 2 | 3 | 4 | 5 | 6 | 7 | 8 | 9 | 10 | 11 | 12 | 13 | 14 | 15 | 16 | 17 | 18 | Final |
|---|---|---|---|---|---|---|---|---|---|---|---|---|---|---|---|---|---|---|---|
| Fiji | 1 | 1 | 4 | 5 | 7 | 7 | 7 | 7 | 7 | 8 | 9 | 10 | 10 | 10 | 10 | 10 | 11 | 11 | 11 |
| India | 0 | 1 | 1 | 1 | 1 | 2 | 3 | 4 | 7 | 7 | 7 | 7 | 9 | 10 | 11 | 14 | 14 | 15 | 15 |
Report

25 July, 18:45
| Team | 1 | 2 | 3 | 4 | 5 | 6 | 7 | 8 | 9 | 10 | 11 | 12 | 13 | 14 | 15 | 16 | 17 | 18 | Final |
|---|---|---|---|---|---|---|---|---|---|---|---|---|---|---|---|---|---|---|---|
| England | 2 | 3 | 6 | 8 | 9 | 10 | 10 | 10 | 10 | 10 | 13 | 14 | 14 | 17 | 19 | 19 | 20 | 20 | 20 |
| Fiji | 0 | 0 | 0 | 0 | 0 | 0 | 4 | 5 | 6 | 8 | 8 | 8 | 14 | 14 | 14 | 16 | 16 | 17 | 17 |
Report

25 July, 18:45
| Team | 1 | 2 | 3 | 4 | 5 | 6 | 7 | 8 | 9 | 10 | 11 | 12 | 13 | 14 | 15 | 16 | 17 | 18 | Final |
|---|---|---|---|---|---|---|---|---|---|---|---|---|---|---|---|---|---|---|---|
| Wales | 0 | 1 | 1 | 1 | 3 | 3 | 7 | 9 | 9 | 12 | 15 | 16 | 16 | 18 | 18 | 19 | 22 | 26 | 26 |
| India | 2 | 2 | 4 | 5 | 5 | 7 | 7 | 7 | 9 | 9 | 9 | 9 | 12 | 12 | 14 | 14 | 14 | 14 | 14 |
Report

25 July, 18:45
| Team | 1 | 2 | 3 | 4 | 5 | 6 | 7 | 8 | 9 | 10 | 11 | 12 | 13 | 14 | 15 | 16 | 17 | 18 | Final |
|---|---|---|---|---|---|---|---|---|---|---|---|---|---|---|---|---|---|---|---|
| England | 1 | 2 | 4 | 4 | 6 | 9 | 13 | 13 | 13 | 16 | 18 | 18 | 19 | 19 | 19 | 20 | 21 | 21 | 21 |
| Wales | 0 | 0 | 0 | 1 | 1 | 1 | 1 | 4 | 6 | 6 | 6 | 7 | 7 | 8 | 9 | 9 | 9 | 10 | 10 |
Report

== Knockout stage ==
Quarterfinals
A1 | Scotland | 25
A2 | New Zealand | 9
D1 | England | 15
C2 | Northern Ireland | 14
B1 | Australia | 12
B2 | Namibia | 19
C1 | Malaysia | 17
D2 | Wales | 9

Semifinals
A1 | Scotland | 16
D1 | England | 15
B2 | Namibia | 15
C1 | Malaysia | 23

Finals
A1 | Scotland | 20
C1 | Malaysia | 3
Third place
D1 | England | 19
B2 | Namibia | 12

=== Quarterfinals ===
26 July, 16:45
| Team | 1 | 2 | 3 | 4 | 5 | 6 | 7 | 8 | 9 | 10 | 11 | 12 | 13 | 14 | 15 | Final |
|---|---|---|---|---|---|---|---|---|---|---|---|---|---|---|---|---|
| Scotland | 2 | 5 | 5 | 7 | 8 | 8 | 10 | 11 | 12 | 16 | 17 | 20 | 20 | 23 | 25 | 25 |
| New Zealand | 0 | 0 | 5 | 5 | 5 | 6 | 6 | 6 | 6 | 6 | 6 | 6 | 9 | 9 | 9 | 9 |
Report

26 July, 16:45
| Team | 1 | 2 | 3 | 4 | 5 | 6 | 7 | 8 | 9 | 10 | 11 | 12 | 13 | 14 | 15 | 16 | 17 | Final |
|---|---|---|---|---|---|---|---|---|---|---|---|---|---|---|---|---|---|---|
| Australia | 0 | 0 | 0 | 0 | 0 | 0 | 0 | 0 | 4 | 5 | 5 | 6 | 9 | 9 | 10 | 10 | 12 | 12 |
| Namibia | 1 | 2 | 5 | 8 | 9 | 12 | 13 | 15 | 15 | 15 | 16 | 16 | 16 | 18 | 18 | 19 | 19 | 19 |
Report

26 July, 16:45
| Team | 1 | 2 | 3 | 4 | 5 | 6 | 7 | 8 | 9 | 10 | 11 | 12 | 13 | 14 | 15 | 16 | 17 | Final |
|---|---|---|---|---|---|---|---|---|---|---|---|---|---|---|---|---|---|---|
| Malaysia | 4 | 4 | 4 | 7 | 9 | 10 | 11 | 13 | 13 | 14 | 14 | 15 | 15 | 15 | 16 | 17 | 17 | 17 |
| Wales | 0 | 1 | 2 | 2 | 2 | 2 | 2 | 2 | 4 | 4 | 5 | 5 | 6 | 7 | 7 | 7 | 9 | 9 |
Report

26 July, 16:45
| Team | 1 | 2 | 3 | 4 | 5 | 6 | 7 | 8 | 9 | 10 | 11 | 12 | 13 | 14 | 15 | 16 | 17 | 18 | Final |
|---|---|---|---|---|---|---|---|---|---|---|---|---|---|---|---|---|---|---|---|
| England | 1 | 1 | 3 | 4 | 4 | 5 | 5 | 5 | 5 | 5 | 5 | 5 | 8 | 10 | 11 | 11 | 13 | 15 | 15 |
| Northern Ireland | 0 | 1 | 1 | 1 | 3 | 3 | 6 | 7 | 8 | 9 | 12 | 13 | 13 | 13 | 13 | 14 | 14 | 14 | 14 |
Report

=== Semifinals ===
27 July, 08:45
| Team | 1 | 2 | 3 | 4 | 5 | 6 | 7 | 8 | 9 | 10 | 11 | 12 | 13 | 14 | 15 | 16 | 17 | 18 | Final |
|---|---|---|---|---|---|---|---|---|---|---|---|---|---|---|---|---|---|---|---|
| Scotland | 0 | 1 | 2 | 2 | 2 | 2 | 2 | 4 | 4 | 6 | 6 | 8 | 10 | 10 | 10 | 14 | 14 | 16 | 16 |
| England | 1 | 1 | 1 | 4 | 5 | 6 | 8 | 8 | 10 | 10 | 11 | 11 | 11 | 12 | 13 | 13 | 15 | 15 | 15 |
Report

27 July, 08:45
| Team | 1 | 2 | 3 | 4 | 5 | 6 | 7 | 8 | 9 | 10 | 11 | 12 | 13 | 14 | 15 | 16 | 17 | Final |
|---|---|---|---|---|---|---|---|---|---|---|---|---|---|---|---|---|---|---|
| Namibia | 0 | 0 | 0 | 0 | 1 | 1 | 4 | 4 | 4 | 4 | 6 | 11 | 12 | 12 | 13 | 15 | 15 | 15 |
| Malaysia | 1 | 3 | 7 | 8 | 8 | 10 | 10 | 12 | 16 | 18 | 18 | 18 | 18 | 22 | 22 | 22 | 23 | 23 |
Report

=== Finals ===
==== Gold medal ====
28 July, 12:45
| Rank | Team | 1 | 2 | 3 | 4 | 5 | 6 | 7 | 8 | 9 | 10 | 11 | 12 | 13 | 14 | 15 | Final |
|---|---|---|---|---|---|---|---|---|---|---|---|---|---|---|---|---|---|
| 1st place, gold medalist(s) | Scotland | 1 | 3 | 5 | 8 | 10 | 12 | 14 | 14 | 16 | 17 | 18 | 19 | 19 | 19 | 20 | 20 |
| 2nd place, silver medalist(s) | Malaysia | 0 | 0 | 0 | 0 | 0 | 0 | 0 | 0 | 0 | 0 | 0 | 0 | 2 | 3 | 3 | 3 |
Report

==== Bronze medal ====
28 July, 12:45
| Rank | Team | 1 | 2 | 3 | 4 | 5 | 6 | 7 | 8 | 9 | 10 | 11 | 12 | 13 | 14 | 15 | 16 | 17 | Final |
|---|---|---|---|---|---|---|---|---|---|---|---|---|---|---|---|---|---|---|---|
| 3rd place, bronze medalist(s) | England | 1 | 4 | 4 | 6 | 8 | 12 | 12 | 12 | 12 | 12 | 14 | 14 | 18 | 18 | 18 | 18 | 19 | 19 |
| 4 | Namibia | 0 | 0 | 1 | 1 | 1 | 1 | 2 | 4 | 5 | 6 | 6 | 8 | 8 | 10 | 11 | 12 | 12 | 12 |
Report
