= Fiji at the 2014 Commonwealth Games =

- CG code: FIJ
- CGA: Fiji Association of Sports and National Olympic Committee
- Website: www.fijiolympiccommittee.com

in Glasgow, Scotland
- Competitors: 26 in 6 sports
- Flag bearer: Litia Tikoisuva
- Officials: Lyndall Fisher (chef de mission)
- Medals Ranked =35th: Gold 0 Silver 0 Bronze 1 Total 1

Commonwealth Games appearances (overview)
- 1938; 1950; 1954; 1958; 1962; 1966; 1970; 1974; 1978; 1982; 1986; 1990–1994; 1998; 2002; 2006; 2010; 2014; 2018; 2022; 2026; 2030

Fiji competed at the 2014 Commonwealth Games in Glasgow from 23 July to 3 August. This marks Fiji's return to the Commonwealth Games. The country was suspended from the Commonwealth of Nations in September 2009 following the 2006 military coup which brought Commodore Voreqe Bainimarama to power. With elections due on 17 September to restore democracy after eight years of military-led rule, Fiji's suspension was lifted in March 2014. After missing the 2010 Commonwealth Games in Delhi, the country was thus able to return in time for Glasgow however it came too late for them to enter a team in the rugby sevens tournament. The Fiji Association of Sports and National Olympic Committee confirmed a delegation of twenty-six athletes in six sports.

== Medalists ==
Medal	Name	Sport	Event	Date
Bronze	Apolonia Vaivai	Weightlifting	Women's 75 kg	July 29

== Athletics ==
Key

- Note – Ranks given for track events are within the athlete's heat only
- Q = Qualified for the next round
- q = Qualified for the next round as a fastest loser or, in field events, by position without achieving the qualifying target
- NR = National record
- N/A = Round not applicable for the event

Men
Track & road events

Athlete	Event	Heat		Semifinal		Final	
Athlete	Event	Result	Rank	Result	Rank	Result	Rank
Ratu Banuve Tabakaucoro	100 m	10.51	30	did not advance			
Ratu Banuve Tabakaucoro	200 m	21.04	26 Q	DSQ		did not advance	

Field Events

Athlete	Event	Qualification		Final	
Athlete	Event	Distance	Rank	Distance	Rank
Eugene Vollmer	Triple jump	15.79	13	did not advance	
Leslie Copeland	Javelin throw	75.59	9 q	68.50	10

Women
Track & road events

Athlete	Event	Heat		Semifinal		Final	
Athlete	Event	Result	Rank	Result	Rank	Result	Rank
Younis Bese	100 m	12.42	37	did not advance			
Younis Bese	200 m	25.84	35	did not advance			

== Judo ==
Men

Athlete	Event	Round of 32	Round of 16	Quarterfinal	Semifinal	Repechage	Final / BM	Rank
Athlete	Event	Opposition Result	Opposition Result	Opposition Result	Opposition Result	Opposition Result	Opposition Result	Rank
Josateki Naulu	−81 kg	Bye	B Munyonga (ZAM); L 0001–1000	did not advance				

== Lawn bowls ==
Men

Athlete	Event	Group Stage		Quarterfinal	Semifinal	Final	Rank
Athlete	Event	Opposition Score	Rank	Opposition Score	Opposition Score	Opposition Score	Rank
Samuela Tuikiligana	Singles	Shahzad (PAK); W 21 – 16; Abdul Rais (MAS); L 19 – 21; Bester (CAN); L 19 – 21; Bahadur (IND); L 12 – 21	4	did not advance			
Arun Kumar; Samuela Tuikiligana	Pairs	Wales; L 12 - 18; India; L 11 - 15; England; L 17 - 20	4	did not advance			
Abdul Kalim; Ratish Lal; Daniel Lum On	Triples	Cook Islands; W 14 - 8 South Africa; L 16 - 17; Kenya; W 22 - 12; Northern Ireland; L 8 - 23	3	did not advance			
Abdul Kalim; Arun Kumar; Ratish Lal; Daniel Lum On	Fours	Kenya; W 17 - 7 Wales; L 7 - 13; Niue; W 21 - 6 Scotland; L 15 - 17	3	did not advance			

Women

Athlete	Event	Group Stage		Quarterfinal	Semifinal	Final	Rank
Athlete	Event	Opposition Score	Rank	Opposition Score	Opposition Score	Opposition Score	Rank
Elizabeth Moceiwai	Singles	Wimp (PNG); L 9 – 21; Piketh (RSA); L 8 – 21; Jim (COK); L 12 – 21; McKerihen (CAN); L 14 – 21	5	did not advance			
Salanieta Gukivuli; Elizabeth Moceiwai	Pairs	Jersey; L 15 - 17; Kenya; L 15 - 19; New Zealand; L 9 - 16; India; W 15 - 10	5	did not advance			
Doreen O'Connor; Radhika Prasad; Litia Tikoisuva	Triples	Canada; W 17 - 16; Cook Islands; W 16 - 12; New Zealand; L 11 - 21; Zambia; L 13 - 16	2 Q	Australia; L 8 - 25	did not advance		
Salanieta Gukivuli; Doreen O'Connor; Radhika Prasad; Litia Tikoisuva	Fours	India; W 19 - 8 Northern Ireland; W 18 - 4 Niue; W 19 - 12; Malaysia; L 12 - 22	2 Q	Malaysia; L 8 - 23	did not advance		

== Shooting ==
Men

Athlete	Event	Qualification		Semifinals		Final	
Athlete	Event	Points	Rank	Points	Rank	Points	Rank
Glenn Kable	Trap	110	9	did not advance			

== Swimming ==
Men

Athlete	Event	Heat		Semifinal		Final	
Athlete	Event	Time	Rank	Time	Rank	Time	Rank
William Clark	50 m freestyle	23.91	25	did not advance			
Meli Malani	50 m freestyle	23.98	27	did not advance			
William Clark	100 m freestyle	55.09	=40	did not advance			
Meli Malani	100 m freestyle	54.05	35	did not advance			
William Clark	100 m backstroke	1:01.76	28	did not advance			
Meli Malani	50 m breaststroke	29.87	18	did not advance			
Meli Malani	50 m butterfly	25.90	25	did not advance			
Meli Malani	100 m butterfly	1:00.91	29	did not advance			

Women

Athlete	Event	Heat		Semifinal		Final	
Athlete	Event	Time	Rank	Time	Rank	Time	Rank
Matelita Buadromo	50 m freestyle	27.75	33	did not advance			
Caroline Puamau	50 m freestyle	26.87	19	did not advance			
Cheyenne Rova	50 m freestyle	27.84	35	did not advance			
Tieri Erasito	100 m freestyle	1:03.12	35	did not advance			
Caroline Puamau	100 m freestyle	59.04	25	did not advance			
Cheyenne Rova	100 m freestyle	1:00.41	29	did not advance			
Matelita Buadromo	200 m freestyle	2:07.77	24	—N/a		did not advance	
Caroline Puamau	50 m backstroke	30.73	13 Q	30.46	12	did not advance	
Cheyenne Rova	50 m backstroke	32.26	20	did not advance			
Tieri Erasito	50 m butterfly	31.40	41	did not advance			
Caroline Puamau	50 m butterfly	29.46	29	did not advance			
Cheyenne Rova	50 m butterfly	30.67	37	did not advance			
Tieri Erasito	100 m butterfly	1:08.08	25	did not advance			
Caroline Puamau	100 m butterfly	1:04.72	21	did not advance			
Tieri Erasito	200 m butterfly	2:28.08	23	—N/a		did not advance	
Matelita Buadromo	200 m individual medley	2:26.00	19	—N/a		did not advance	
Matelita Buadromo; Tieri Erasito; Caroline Puamau; Cheyenne Rova	4 × 100 m freestyle relay	4:02.80	9	—N/a		did not advance	

== Weightlifting ==
Men

Athlete	Event	Snatch		Clean & Jerk		Total	Rank
Athlete	Event	Result	Rank	Result	Rank	Total	Rank
Tevita Tawai	−77 kg	115	13	165	8	280	10

Women

Athlete	Event	Snatch		Clean & Jerk		Total	Rank
Athlete	Event	Result	Rank	Result	Rank	Total	Rank
Seruwaia Malani	−48 kg	55	8	65	7	120	7
Julia Timi	−63 kg	70	13	NM		DNF	
Apolonia Vaivai	−75 kg	97	3	112	3	209	3rd place, bronze medalist(s)
