= Cook Islands at the 2014 Commonwealth Games =

- Flag of the Cook Islands
- CGF code: COK
- CGA: Cook Islands Sports and National Olympic Committee
- Website: www.oceaniasport.com/cookis

in Glasgow, Scotland
- Competitors: 25 in 4 sports
- Flag bearer: Patricia Taea
- Medals: Gold 0 Silver 0 Bronze 0 Total 0

Commonwealth Games appearances (overview)
- 1974; 1978; 1982; 1986; 1990; 1994; 1998; 2002; 2006; 2010; 2014; 2018; 2022; 2026; 2030

The Cook Islands competed in the 2014 Commonwealth Games in Glasgow, Scotland from 23 July to 3 August 2014. The country participated in the Commonwealth Games for the tenth time, and has never previously won a medal.

== Athletics ==
Key

- Note – Ranks given for track events are within the athlete's heat only
- Q = Qualified for the next round
- q = Qualified for the next round as a fastest loser or, in field events, by position without achieving the qualifying target
- NR = National record
- N/A = Round not applicable for the event

Men
Track & road events

Athlete	Event	Heat		Semifinal		Final	
Athlete	Event	Result	Rank	Result	Rank	Result	Rank
Alex Beddoes	800 m	1:53.16	22	did not advance			

Women
Track & road events

Athlete	Event	Heat		Semifinal		Final	
Athlete	Event	Result	Rank	Result	Rank	Result	Rank
Patricia Taea	100 m	12.68	42	did not advance			
Patricia Taea	200 m	26.14	38	did not advance			

== Lawn bowls ==
Men

Athlete	Event	Group Stage		Quarterfinal	Semifinal	Final	Rank
Athlete	Event	Opposition Score	Rank	Opposition Score	Opposition Score	Opposition Score	Rank
Munokokura Pita	Singles	Burnett (SCO); L 0 – 21; Donnelly (RSA); W 21 – 1 Le Ber (GUE); L 16 – 21; Esterhuizen (NAM); W 21 – 17; Musonda (ZAM); L 10 – 21	5	did not advance			
Tuatiaki Papatua; Munokokura Pita	Pairs	Australia; L 11 - 25; Norfolk Island; L 10 - 26; Jersey; L 12 - 24; Namibia; L 13 - 21	5	did not advance			
Vaine Henry; Phillip Jim; Pi Paniani	Triples	Fiji; L 8 - 14; Northern Ireland; L 15 - 17; South Africa; L 10 - 18; Kenya; D 15 - 15	5	did not advance			
Vaine Henry; Phillip Jim; Pi Paniani; Tuatiaki Papatua	Fours	England; L 11 - 22; Zambia; W 14 - 11; Northern Ireland; L 4 - 21; Jersey; W 18 - 12	3	did not advance			

Women

Athlete	Event	Group Stage		Quarterfinal	Semifinal	Final	Rank
Athlete	Event	Opposition Score	Rank	Opposition Score	Opposition Score	Opposition Score	Rank
Teokotai Jim	Singles	McKerihen (CAN); W 21 – 20; Moceiwai (FIJ); W 21 – 12; Piketh (RSA); L 13 – 21; Wimp (PNG); W 21 – 9	2 Q	Piketh (RSA); L 20 – 21	did not advance		
Teokotai Jim; Linda Vavia	Pairs	England; L 13 - 15; Canada; L 5 - 25; Wales; L 13 - 14	4	did not advance			
Antonina Browne; Matangaro Tupuna; Mata Vaile	Triples	New Zealand; L 7 - 21; Zambia; W 22 - 8 Fiji; L 12 - 16; Canada; L 13 - 20	5	did not advance			
Antonina Browne; Matangaro Tupuna; Mata Vaile; Linda Vavia	Fours	Scotland; L 11 - 16; Papua New Guinea; W 21 - 16; Jersey; W 12 - 7 Australia; L 6 - 19	4	did not advance			

== Rugby sevens ==
Cook Islands has qualified a rugby sevens team.

Roster

- Harry Berryman
- Ashley Drake
- Sean Fletcher
- James Iopu
- Junior Kiria
- Koiatu Koiatu
- Simon Marcel
- Gregory Mullany
- Teu Paerau
- Josh Petero
- James Raea
- Twoboys Taia

Team	Pld	W	D	L	PF	PA	PD	Pts	Qualification
South Africa	3	3	0	0	106	0	+106	9	Medal competition
Kenya	3	2	0	1	63	25	+38	7	Medal competition
Cook Islands	3	1	0	2	33	88	−55	5	Bowl competition
Trinidad and Tobago	3	0	0	3	15	104	−89	3	Bowl competition

26 July 2014
11:16

Kenya	28–0	Cook Islands
	Report

Ibrox Stadium, Glasgow

26 July 2014
14:40

Cook Islands	33–10	Trinidad and Tobago
	Report

Ibrox Stadium, Glasgow

26 July 2014
19:30

South Africa	50–0	Cook Islands
	Report

Ibrox Stadium, Glasgow

Bowl Quarterfinals

27 July 2014
11:38

Cook Islands	31–7	Barbados
	Report

Ibrox Stadium, Glasgow

Bowl Semifinals

27 July 2014
17:38

Papua New Guinea	12–24	Cook Islands
	Report

Ibrox Stadium, Glasgow

Bowl Finals

27 July 2014
20:10

Canada	50–7	Cook Islands
	Report

Ibrox Stadium, Glasgow

== Weightlifting ==
Women

Athlete	Event	Snatch		Clean & Jerk		Total	Rank
Athlete	Event	Result	Rank	Result	Rank	Total	Rank
Luisa Peters	+75 kg	100	6	125	6	225	6
