= Norfolk Island at the 2014 Commonwealth Games =

- CG code: NFK
- CGA: Norfolk Island Amateur Sports and Commonwealth Games Association
- Website: oceaniasport.com/

in Glasgow, Scotland
- Competitors: 24 in 4 sports
- Flag bearer: John Christian
- Medals: Gold 0 Silver 0 Bronze 0 Total 0

Commonwealth Games appearances (overview)
- 1986; 1990; 1994; 1998; 2002; 2006; 2010; 2014; 2018; 2022; 2026; 2030

Norfolk Island competed in the 2014 Commonwealth Games in Glasgow, Scotland from 23 July to 3 August 2014. 24 athletes in four sports will represent the country.

== Badminton ==
Individual

Athlete	Event	Round of 64	Round of 32	Round of 16	Quarterfinals	Semifinals	Final
Athlete	Event	Opposition Score	Opposition Score	Opposition Score	Opposition Score	Opposition Score	Opposition Score
Richard Cribb	Men's singles	Merrilees (SCO); L 0 - 2	did not advance				
Michael Donohoe	Men's singles	Cupidon (SEY); L 0 - 2	did not advance				
Jason Quintal	Men's singles	Thorpe (BAR); L 0 - 2	did not advance				
Tez Gray	Women's singles	Utimawa (KIR); W w/o	Hendahewa (SRI); L 0 - 2	did not advance			
Jo Snell	Women's singles	Chambers (NIR); L 0 - 2	did not advance				

Doubles

Athlete	Event	Round of 64	Round of 32	Round of 16	Quarterfinals	Semifinals	Final
Athlete	Event	Opposition Score	Opposition Score	Opposition Score	Opposition Score	Opposition Score	Opposition Score
Richard Cribb; Michael Donohoe	Men's doubles	Bye	Malaysia; L 0 - 2	did not advance			
Tez Gray; Jo Snell	Women's doubles	—N/a	Australia; L 0 - 2	did not advance			
Michael Donohoe; Jo Snell	Mixed doubles	Kenya; L 0 - 2	did not advance				
Richard Cribb; Tez Gray	Mixed doubles	Ghana; L 0 - 2	did not advance				

Mixed team

Pool E

Pos	Team	Pld	W	L	GF	GA	GD	PF	PA	PD	Pts	Qualification
1	Singapore	3	3	0	30	1	+29	644	278	+366	3	Quarterfinals
2	South Africa	3	2	1	18	14	+4	551	457	+94	2	
3	Jamaica	3	1	2	15	18	−3	527	510	+17	1	
4	Norfolk Island	3	0	3	0	30	−30	153	630	−477	0	

Source: glasgow2014.com

Norfolk Island
0
Commonwealth Arena, Glasgow
24 July

South Africa
5

			1	2	3
1	(Norfolk Island) (South Africa)	Jason Quintal / Terry Gray; Andries Malan / Jennifer Fry	3; 21	3; 21
2	(Norfolk Island) (South Africa)	Richard Cribb; Jacob Maliekal	3; 21	2; 21
3	(Norfolk Island) (South Africa)	Joanne Snell; Elme de Villiers	5; 21	4; 21
4	(Norfolk Island) (South Africa)	Jason Quintal / Michael Donohoe; Andries Malan / Willem Viljoen	3; 21	3; 21
5	(Norfolk Island) (South Africa)	Joanne Snell / Terry Gray; Sandra le Grange / Elme de Villiers	10; 21	8; 21

Norfolk Island
0
Commonwealth Arena, Glasgow
25 July

Jamaica
5

			1	2	3
1	(Norfolk Island) (Jamaica)	Michael Donohoe / Joanne Snell; Garron Palmer / Geordine Henry	4; 21	6; 21
2	(Norfolk Island) (Jamaica)	Richard Cribb; Gareth Henry	7; 21	3; 21
3	(Norfolk Island) (Jamaica)	Terry Gray; Ruth Williams	7; 21	10; 21
4	(Norfolk Island) (Jamaica)	Jason Quintal / Michael Donohoe; Gareth Henry / Garron Palmer	2; 21	5; 21
5	(Norfolk Island) (Jamaica)	Terry Gray / Joanne Snell; Ruth Williams / Gareth Henry	7; 21	10; 21

Singapore
5
Commonwealth Arena, Glasgow
26 July

Norfolk Island
0

			1	2	3
1	(Singapore) (Norfolk Island)	Terry Hee / Fu Mingtian; Michael Donohoe / Joanne Snell	21; 3	21; 10
2	(Singapore) (Norfolk Island)	Derek Wong; Richard Cribb	21; 2	21; 1
3	(Singapore) (Norfolk Island)	Liang Xiaoyu; Terry Gray	21; 5	21; 7
4	(Singapore) (Norfolk Island)	Chayut Triyachart / Danny Bawa Chrisnanta; Richard Cribb / Michael Donohoe	21; 7	21; 3
5	(Singapore) (Norfolk Island)	Shinta Mulia Sari / Yao Lei; Joanne Snell / Terry Gray	21; 7	21; 3

== Lawn bowls ==
Men

Athlete	Event	Group Stage		Quarterfinal	Semifinal	Final	Rank
Athlete	Event	Opposition Score	Rank	Opposition Score	Opposition Score	Opposition Score	Rank
John Christian	Singles	de Sousa (JER); L 12 – 24; Callus (MLT); L 14 – 21; Gabriel (SAM); L 14 – 21; McIlroy (NZL); L 20 – 21; Juni (PNG); W 21 – 20; McHugh (NIR); L 12 – 21	6	did not advance			
John Christian; Tim Sheridan	Pairs	Namibia; L 9 - 20; Cook Islands; W 26 - 10; Australia; L 10 - 14; Jersey; W 17 - 12	3	did not advance			
Phil Jones; Pete Walkinshaw; Baz Wilson	Triples	Canada; L 11 - 18; New Zealand; L 6 - 29; Jersey; L 8 - 19; Zambia; W 25 - 8 Guernsey; L 6 - 30	5	did not advance			
Phil Jones; Tim Sheridan; Pete Walkinshaw; Baz Wilson	Fours	New Zealand; L 9 - 26; Papua New Guinea; W w/o Australia; L 10 - 20; Malaysia; W 18 - 12	2 Q	India; L 4 - 26	did not advance		

Women

Athlete	Event	Group Stage		Quarterfinal	Semifinal	Final	Rank
Athlete	Event	Opposition Score	Rank	Opposition Score	Opposition Score	Opposition Score	Rank
Carmen Anderson	Singles	Rereiti (NIU); W 21 – 12; Ahmad (MAS); W 21 – 15; Saikia (IND); W 21 – 6 Edwards (NZL); L 16 – 21	2 Q	Edwards (NZL); L 17 – 21	did not advance		
Carmen Anderson; Essie Sanchez	Pairs	South Africa; W 26 - 10; Samoa; W 21 - 15; Scotland; L 13 - 14; Zambia; W 18 - 13	2 Q	England; L 12 - 17	did not advance		
Tess Evans; Petal Jones; Wendy Nagy	Triples	South Africa; L 12 - 15; Wales; L 12 - 14	3	did not advance			
Tess Evans; Petal Jones; Wendy Nagy; Essie Sanchez	Fours	South Africa; W 17 - 13; England; L 7 - 22; Canada; L 13 - 14	3	did not advance			

== Shooting ==
Men

Athlete	Event	Qualification		Final	
Athlete	Event	Points	Rank	Points	Rank
Bill Burton	Trap	79	35	did not advance	
Bill Burton	Double trap	DNS		did not advance	
Bill Burton	Skeet	70	27	did not advance	
Graham Cock	25 metre rapid fire pistol	449	10	did not advance	
Kevin Coulter	10 metre air pistol	482	30	did not advance	
Kevin Coulter	50 metre pistol	396	24	did not advance	
Douglas Creek	10 metre air pistol	518	28	did not advance	
Douglas Creek	50 metre pistol	464	23	did not advance	
Mitchell Meers	Trap	90	29	did not advance	
Mitchell Meers	Double trap	75	15	did not advance	
Mitchell Meers	Skeet	76	25	did not advance	

Women

Athlete	Event	Qualification		Final	
Athlete	Event	Points	Rank	Points	Rank
Jacqui Grundy	10 metre air pistol	329	28	did not advance	
Jacqui Grundy	25 metre pistol	510	24	did not advance	
Denise Reeves	10 metre air pistol	336	26	did not advance	
Denise Reeves	25 metre pistol	493	25	did not advance	

== Squash ==
Two squash athletes are representing the island.

Doubles

Athlete	Event	Group Stage				Round of 16	Quarterfinal	Semifinal	Final	
Athlete	Event	Opposition Score	Opposition Score	Opposition Score	Rank	Opposition Score	Opposition Score	Opposition Score	Opposition Score	Rank
Duncan Gray; Mitchell Graham	Men's doubles	New Zealand; L 0 - 2	Sri Lanka; L 1 - 2	Australia; L 0 - 2	4	did not advance				

== See also ==
- Sport in Norfolk Island
