= Niue at the 2014 Commonwealth Games =

- CGF code: NIU
- CGA: Niue Island Sports Association National Olympic Committee
- Website: oceaniasport.com/niue

in Glasgow, Scotland
- Competitors: 26 in 4 sports
- Flag bearer: Hina Rereiti
- Medals: Gold 0 Silver 0 Bronze 0 Total 0

Commonwealth Games appearances (overview)
- 2002; 2006; 2010; 2014; 2018; 2022; 2026; 2030

Niue competed in the 2014 Commonwealth Games in Glasgow, Scotland from 23 July to 3 August 2014. Niue participated in the Commonwealth Games for the fourth time, and has never previously won a medal. Niue's team consisted of 26 athletes in four sports.

== Athletics ==
Key

- Note – Ranks given for track events are within the athlete's heat only
- Q = Qualified for the next round
- q = Qualified for the next round as a fastest loser or, in field events, by position without achieving the qualifying target
- NR = National record
- N/A = Round not applicable for the event
- Bye = Athlete not required to compete in round

Men
Field events

Athlete	Event	Qualification		Final	
Athlete	Event	Distance	Position	Distance	Position
Jinnam Hopotoa	Discus throw	40.32	18	did not advance	
Ikipa Misikea	Javelin throw	51.68	21	did not advance	
Misinia Misikea	Javelin throw	47.95	22	did not advance	

== Lawn bowls ==
Team Manager (Men's) - Mark Blumsky, Team Manager (Women's) - Pilena Motufoou, Coach - Ezra Talamahina.

Men

Athlete	Event	Group Stage		Quarterfinal	Semifinal	Final	Rank
Athlete	Event	Opposition Score	Rank	Opposition Score	Opposition Score	Opposition Score	Rank
Dalton Tagelagi	Singles	Sherriff (AUS); L 6 – 21; Njuguna (KEN); L 9 – 21; Tolchard (ENG); L 9 – 21; Weale (WAL); L 18 – 21	5	did not advance			
Frederick Tafatu; Dalton Tagelagi	Pairs	New Zealand; L 11 - 14; Zambia; L 12 - 18; Scotland; L 7 - 21; South Africa; L 5 - 25	5	did not advance			
Keith Papani; Asu Pulu; Karl Samupo	Triples	Wales; L 5 - 34; India; L 12 - 21; Scotland; L 6 - 32; Namibia; L 9 - 21	5	did not advance			
Keith Papani; Asu Pulu; Karl Samupo; Frederick Tafatu	Fours	Scotland; L 9 - 22; Fiji; L 6 - 21; Wales; L 10 - 32; Kenya; L 3 - 27	5	did not advance			

Women

Athlete	Event	Group Stage		Quarterfinal	Semifinal	Final	Rank
Athlete	Event	Opposition Score	Rank	Opposition Score	Opposition Score	Opposition Score	Rank
Hina Rereiti	Singles	Anderson (NFI); L 12 – 21; Edwards (NZL); L 8 – 21; Saikia (IND); L 10 – 21; Ahmad (MAS); L 2 – 21	5	did not advance			
Josephine Peyroux; Hina Rereiti	Pairs	Australia; L 9 - 30; Papua New Guinea; L 16 - 19; Northern Ireland; D 18 - 18; Malaysia; L 5 - 29	5	did not advance			
Catherine Papani; Jade Posimani; Rosaalofa Rex	Triples	Australia; L 10 - 24; India; L 1 - 30; Jersey; L 15 - 16; Malaysia; L 8 - 26	5	did not advance			
Catherine Papani; Josephine Peyroux; Jade Posimani; Rosaalofa Rex	Fours	Malaysia; L 8 - 17; India; L 12 - 20; Northern Ireland; L 9 - 31; Fiji; L 12 - 19	5	did not advance			

== Shooting ==
Men

Athlete	Event	Qualification		Final	
Athlete	Event	Points	Rank	Points	Rank
Hivi Puheke	Double trap	52	17	did not advance	
SioneBelle Togiavalu	Double trap	68	16	did not advance	
Edward Sietu	Trap	84	33	did not advance	
Clayton Viliamu	Trap	90	30	did not advance	
Morgan Magatogia	Skeet	DNS		did not advance	

Women

Athlete	Event	Qualification		Final	
Athlete	Event	Points	Rank	Points	Rank
Clemencia Sioneholo	Trap	31	16	did not advance	
Kirsty Togiavalu	Trap	24	17	did not advance	

== Weightlifting ==
Men

Athlete	Event	Snatch		Clean & Jerk		Total	Rank
Athlete	Event	Result	Rank	Result	Rank	Total	Rank
Jack Feleti	−77 kg	95	23	123	24	218	23
Zeke Pullan	−85 kg	No Mark		did not finish			
Rexricco Melekitama	−105 kg	91	12	125	11	216	11
Daniel Nemani	+105 kg	145	8	176	10	321	9

Women

Athlete	Event	Snatch		Clean & Jerk		Total	Rank
Athlete	Event	Result	Rank	Result	Rank	Total	Rank
Malia Vea	−75 kg	50	9	70	9	120	9
Vitolia Tauasi	+75 kg	67	14	78	14	145	14
