= Lawn bowls at the 2014 Commonwealth Games – Women's pairs =

Lawn bowls – Women's pairs at the 2014 Commonwealth Games
- Venue: Kelvingrove Lawn Bowls Centre
- Dates: 28 July-01 August 2014
- Competitors: 38 from 19 nations

Medalists
gold medal	Colleen Piketh; Tracy-Lee Botha	South Africa
silver medal	Jamie-Lea Winch; Natalie Melmore	England
bronze medal	Barbara Cameron; Mandy Cunningham	Northern Ireland

The Women's pair at the 2014 Commonwealth Games, was part of the lawn bowls competition, which took place between 28 July and 1 August 2014 at the Kelvingrove Lawn Bowls Centre. South Africa's Colleen Piketh and Tracy-Lee Botha won the gold medal, defeating Jamie-Lea Winch and Natalie Melmore of England in the final. Barbara Cameron and Mandy Cunningham from Northern Ireland won the bronze medal.

== Sectional play ==
=== Section A ===
Rank	Team	Team	MP	MW	MT	ML	For	Ag	PD	Pts
1	Australia	Carla Odgers & Natasha Scott	4	4	0	0	84	50	+34	12
2	Northern Ireland	Barbara Cameron & Mandy Cunningham	4	2	1	1	76	66	+10	7
3	Malaysia	Siti Zalina Ahmad & Nor Hashimah Ismail	4	2	0	2	72	60	+12	6
4	Papua New Guinea	Jane Wangon & Catherine Wimp	4	1	0	3	57	65	-8	3
5	Niue	Josephine Peyroux & Hina Rereiti	4	0	1	3	48	96	-48	1

28 July, 08:45
Team	1	2	3	4	5	6	7	8	9	10	11	12	13	14	15	16	17	18	Final
Australia	4	8	11	12	15	17	22	22	22	22	22	23	23	23	25	26	28	30	30
Niue	0	0	0	0	0	0	0	1	2	4	7	7	8	9	9	9	9	9	9
Report

28 July, 08:45
Team	1	2	3	4	5	6	7	8	9	10	11	12	13	14	15	16	17	18	Final
Malaysia	0	1	1	3	3	3	8	8	10	11	12	13	13	17	17	17	17	17	17
Papua New Guinea	1	1	3	3	5	7	7	8	8	8	8	8	9	9	10	11	12	13	13
Report

29 July, 08:45
Team	1	2	3	4	5	6	7	8	9	10	11	12	13	14	15	16	17	18	Final
Malaysia	0	0	0	1	2	2	2	2	2	2	2	2	3	5	7	7	11	12	12
Northern Ireland	4	5	9	9	9	11	14	16	19	21	22	23	23	23	23	24	24	24	24
Report

29 July, 08:45
Team	1	2	3	4	5	6	7	8	9	10	11	12	13	14	15	16	17	18	Final
Papua New Guinea	1	2	3	3	3	4	6	6	10	10	10	10	13	13	15	17	17	19	19
Niue	0	0	0	2	3	3	3	5	5	8	11	13	13	15	15	15	16	16	16
Report

29 July, 15:45
Team	1	2	3	4	5	6	7	8	9	10	11	12	13	14	15	16	17	18	Final
Australia	1	1	3	3	3	4	5	6	6	6	6	6	8	10	11	12	12	13	13
Papua New Guinea	0	1	1	4	6	6	6	6	7	9	10	11	11	11	11	11	12	12	12
Report

30 July, 08:45
Team	1	2	3	4	5	6	7	8	9	10	11	12	13	14	15	16	17	18	Final
Australia	2	3	7	7	10	12	15	15	16	16	17	17	17	17	19	19	23	23	23
Northern Ireland	0	0	0	1	1	1	1	4	4	6	6	7	9	10	10	14	14	15	15
Report

30 July, 08:45
Team	1	2	3	4	5	6	7	8	9	10	11	12	13	14	15	16	17	18	Final
Malaysia	1	1	2	5	7	10	12	13	13	14	15	15	18	22	26	26	26	29	29
Niue	0	1	1	1	1	1	1	1	2	2	2	3	3	3	3	4	5	5	5
Report

30 July, 11:45
Team	1	2	3	4	5	6	7	8	9	10	11	12	13	14	15	16	17	18	Final
Australia	3	6	6	8	10	13	13	13	13	13	14	14	14	16	17	17	17	18	18
Malaysia	0	0	3	3	3	3	5	6	8	9	9	10	11	11	11	13	14	14	14
Report

30 July, 11:45
Team	1	2	3	4	5	6	7	8	9	10	11	12	13	14	15	16	17	18	Final
Northern Ireland	2	4	4	6	8	8	8	10	10	10	12	13	16	17	17	18	18	19	19
Papua New Guinea	0	0	2	2	2	5	8	8	10	11	11	11	11	11	12	12	13	13	13
Report

=== Section B ===
Rank	Team	Team	MP	MW	MT	ML	For	Ag	PD	Pts
1	New Zealand	Jo Edwards & Val Smith	4	4	0	0	79	47	+32	12
2	Jersey	Katie Nixon & Lindsey Greechan	4	2	0	2	58	60	-2	6
3	India	Tania Choudhury & Pinki	4	2	0	2	55	63	-8	6
4	Fiji	Salanieta Gukivuli & Elizabeth Moceiwai	4	1	0	3	54	62	-8	3
5	Kenya	Eunice Mbugua & Susan Kariuki	4	1	0	3	58	72	-14	3

28 July, 08:45
Team	1	2	3	4	5	6	7	8	9	10	11	12	13	14	15	16	17	18	Final
New Zealand	0	0	3	5	5	5	7	7	7	8	10	13	16	16	18	18	20	21	21
Kenya	4	5	5	5	6	9	9	10	11	11	11	11	11	12	12	14	14	14	14
Report

28 July, 08:45
Team	1	2	3	4	5	6	7	8	9	10	11	12	13	14	15	16	17	18	Final
Jersey	0	1	1	1	2	2	3	5	5	5	6	6	10	11	11	11	11	12	12
India	4	4	5	6	6	8	8	8	9	10	10	11	11	11	12	13	14	14	14
Report

29 July, 08:45
Team	1	2	3	4	5	6	7	8	9	10	11	12	13	14	15	16	17	18	Final
Jersey	2	6	8	8	10	10	10	11	12	12	13	14	15	16	16	16	16	17	17
Fiji	0	0	0	3	3	5	7	7	7	9	9	9	9	9	10	13	15	15	15
Report

29 July, 08:45
Team	1	2	3	4	5	6	7	8	9	10	11	12	13	14	15	16	17	18	Final
India	0	0	3	7	7	7	7	10	10	12	12	12	12	13	14	18	19	20	20
Kenya	1	2	2	2	3	4	6	6	8	8	10	11	12	12	12	12	12	12	12
Report

29 July, 15:45
Team	1	2	3	4	5	6	7	8	9	10	11	12	13	14	15	16	17	18	Final
New Zealand	0	0	1	1	2	4	6	7	8	8	9	13	15	19	22	24	24	24	24
India	1	6	6	7	7	7	7	7	7	8	8	8	8	8	8	8	9	11	11
Report

29 July, 15:45
Team	1	2	3	4	5	6	7	8	9	10	11	12	13	14	15	16	17	18	Final
Fiji	0	1	1	1	3	3	5	8	8	8	8	12	13	13	13	15	15	15	17
Kenya	1	1	2	3	3	5	5	5	6	7	10	10	10	12	16	16	18	19	19
Report

30 July, 08:45
Team	1	2	3	4	5	6	7	8	9	10	11	12	13	14	15	16	17	18	Final
New Zealand	0	2	2	3	3	3	4	6	9	11	11	12	12	12	13	15	16	16	16
Fiji	1	1	2	2	3	4	4	4	4	4	5	5	7	8	8	8	8	9	9
Report

30 July, 08:45
Team	1	2	3	4	5	6	7	8	9	10	11	12	13	14	15	16	17	18	Final
Jersey	0	0	1	3	4	4	8	8	8	8	8	8	11	12	13	15	15	16	16
Kenya	1	2	2	2	2	4	4	5	7	10	11	12	12	12	12	12	13	13	13
Report

30 July, 11:45
Team	1	2	3	4	5	6	7	8	9	10	11	12	13	14	15	16	17	18	Final
New Zealand	1	1	2	4	4	5	6	6	6	6	6	7	11	13	14	14	17	18	18
Jersey	0	3	3	3	4	4	4	5	8	9	11	11	11	11	11	13	13	13	13
Report

30 July, 11:45
Team	1	2	3	4	5	6	7	8	9	10	11	12	13	14	15	16	17	18	Final
Fiji	0	0	2	2	3	3	5	7	8	9	9	10	11	11	14	14	14	15	15
India	1	2	2	3	3	5	5	5	5	5	6	6	6	7	7	8	10	10	10
Report

=== Section C ===
Rank	Team	Team	MP	MW	MT	ML	For	Ag	PD	Pts
1	Norfolk Island	Carmen Anderson & Essie Sanchez	4	3	0	1	78	52	+26	9
2	South Africa	Colleen Piketh & Tracy-Lee Botha	4	3	0	1	72	66	+6	9
3	Scotland	Caroline Brown & Lorraine Malloy	4	2	1	1	74	59	+15	7
4	Zambia	Matimba Like & Banda Foster	4	1	1	2	77	73	+4	4
5	Samoa	Sulami Asa & Alofa Adam	4	0	0	4	46	97	-51	0

28 July, 08:45
Team	1	2	3	4	5	6	7	8	9	10	11	12	13	14	15	16	17	18	Final
Scotland	0	6	6	7	9	10	10	10	10	11	12	17	18	18	21	22	23	25	25
Samoa	1	1	2	2	2	2	3	5	8	8	8	8	8	9	9	9	9	9	9
Report

28 July, 08:45
Team	1	2	3	4	5	6	7	8	9	10	11	12	13	14	15	16	17	18	Final
South Africa	0	1	3	6	6	12	15	15	16	17	17	17	17	18	19	19	19	20	20
Zambia	1	1	1	1	4	4	4	6	6	6	8	11	12	12	12	14	18	18	18
Report

29 July, 08:45
Team	1	2	3	4	5	6	7	8	9	10	11	12	13	14	15	16	17	18	Final
South Africa	0	0	0	0	1	1	1	1	1	2	5	5	6	7	8	8	8	10	10
Norfolk Island	1	3	6	10	10	13	14	15	17	17	17	18	18	18	18	24	26	26	26
Report

29 July, 08:45
Team	1	2	3	4	5	6	7	8	9	10	11	12	13	14	15	16	17	18	Final
Zambia	0	0	1	1	1	3	4	8	8	13	14	16	17	17	21	23	25	25	25
Samoa	3	4	4	7	8	8	8	8	9	9	9	9	9	12	12	12	12	14	14
Report

29 July, 15:45
Team	1	2	3	4	5	6	7	8	9	10	11	12	13	14	15	16	17	18	Final
Scotland	1	3	3	6	7	9	9	9	10	14	16	16	16	16	16	19	21	21	17
Zambia	0	0	2	2	2	2	4	7	7	7	7	11	13	15	20	20	20	21	21
Report

29 July, 15:45
Team	1	2	3	4	5	6	7	8	9	10	11	12	13	14	15	16	17	18	Final
Norfolk Island	0	0	2	5	7	7	7	7	7	8	11	11	14	14	16	17	18	21	21
Samoa	4	7	7	7	7	8	9	11	12	12	12	14	14	15	15	15	15	15	15
Report

30 July, 08:45
Team	1	2	3	4	5	6	7	8	9	10	11	12	13	14	15	16	17	18	Final
Scotland	1	1	1	1	5	5	6	6	6	8	9	9	9	9	10	12	12	14	14
Norfolk Island	0	1	2	3	3	6	6	7	8	8	8	10	11	12	12	12	13	13	13
Report

30 July, 08:45
Team	1	2	3	4	5	6	7	8	9	10	11	12	13	14	15	16	17	18	Final
South Africa	1	4	5	5	6	8	11	12	16	16	16	19	20	20	20	23	23	26	26
Samoa	0	0	0	1	1	1	1	1	1	3	5	5	5	6	7	7	8	8	8
Report

30 July, 11:45
Team	1	2	3	4	5	6	7	8	9	10	11	12	13	14	15	16	17	18	Final
Scotland	0	0	0	2	2	2	2	2	4	5	6	8	9	9	11	12	14	14	14
South Africa	4	6	10	10	11	12	13	14	14	14	14	14	14	15	15	15	15	16	16
Report

30 July, 11:45
Team	1	2	3	4	5	6	7	8	9	10	11	12	13	14	15	16	17	18	Final
Norfolk Island	0	0	0	2	4	5	5	6	8	8	8	9	9	10	11	13	16	18	18
Zambia	1	2	4	4	4	4	10	10	10	11	12	12	13	13	13	13	13	13	13
Report

=== Section D ===
Rank	Team	Team	MP	MW	MT	ML	For	Ag	PD	Pts
1	Wales	Anwen Butten & Caroline Taylor	3	2	1	0	48	38	+10	7
2	England	Jamie-Lea Winch & Natalie Melmore	3	2	1	0	44	41	+3	7
3	Canada	Leanne Chinery & Jackie Foster	3	1	0	2	48	38	+10	3
4	Cook Islands	Teokotai Jim & Linda Vavia	3	0	0	3	31	54	-23	0

28 July, 08:45
Team	1	2	3	4	5	6	7	8	9	10	11	12	13	14	15	16	17	18	Final
England	0	2	3	3	7	7	8	8	9	11	11	11	12	13	15	15	15	15	15
Cook Islands	2	2	2	5	5	6	6	7	7	7	8	10	10	10	10	11	12	13	13
Report

29 July, 08:45
Team	1	2	3	4	5	6	7	8	9	10	11	12	13	14	15	16	17	18	Final
Wales	0	1	2	3	6	6	7	7	8	8	10	11	11	12	16	17	17	19	19
Canada	1	1	1	1	1	2	2	3	3	6	6	6	8	8	8	8	10	10	13
Report

29 July, 15:45
Team	1	2	3	4	5	6	7	8	9	10	11	12	13	14	15	16	17	18	Final
Canada	0	1	2	6	6	8	9	13	16	17	18	20	22	22	23	24	25	25	25
Cook Islands	1	1	1	1	2	2	2	2	2	2	2	2	2	3	3	3	3	5	5
Report

30 July, 08:45
Team	1	2	3	4	5	6	7	8	9	10	11	12	13	14	15	16	17	18	Final
England	1	3	5	5	8	9	9	10	10	11	11	13	13	14	14	14	14	14	14
Canada	0	0	0	1	1	1	5	5	6	6	7	7	8	8	10	11	12	13	13
Report

30 July, 08:45
Team	1	2	3	4	5	6	7	8	9	10	11	12	13	14	15	16	17	18	Final
Wales	0	1	3	3	3	3	4	6	9	10	11	11	12	13	13	13	14	14	14
Cook Islands	1	1	1	2	4	5	5	5	5	5	5	6	6	6	8	9	9	13	13
Report

30 July, 11:45
Team	1	2	3	4	5	6	7	8	9	10	11	12	13	14	15	16	17	18	Final
England	2	3	4	4	6	7	7	7	9	10	10	10	11	11	12	12	13	15	15
Wales	0	0	0	3	3	3	6	7	7	7	8	9	9	12	12	15	15	15	15
Report

== Knockout stage ==
Quarterfinals
A1	Australia	11
B2	Jersey	16
D1	Wales	15
C2	South Africa	20
B1	New Zealand	10
A2	Northern Ireland	14
C1	Norfolk Island	12
D2	England	17

Semifinals
B2	Jersey	9
C2	South Africa	20
A2	Northern Ireland	14
D2	England	19

Finals
C2	South Africa	20
D2	England	17
Third place
B2	Jersey	14
A2	Northern Ireland	15

=== Quarterfinals ===
31 July, 08:45
Team	1	2	3	4	5	6	7	8	9	10	11	12	13	14	15	16	17	18	Final
Australia	0	1	2	3	4	5	6	7	7	9	9	10	10	11	11	11	11	11	11
Jersey	4	4	4	4	4	4	4	4	6	6	7	7	8	8	11	13	15	16	16
Report

31 July, 08:45
Team	1	2	3	4	5	6	7	8	9	10	11	12	13	14	15	16	17	18	Final
New Zealand	0	2	2	3	6	7	8	8	8	8	8	10	10	10	10	10	10	10	10
Northern Ireland	1	1	2	2	2	2	2	3	4	5	6	6	7	8	9	10	13	14	14
Report

31 July, 08:45
Team	1	2	3	4	5	6	7	8	9	10	11	12	13	14	15	16	17	18	Final
Norfolk Island	1	1	1	3	3	3	4	5	5	5	6	6	6	6	10	10	12	12	12
England	0	2	6	6	7	8	8	8	10	11	11	12	13	14	14	16	16	17	17
Report

31 July, 08:45
Team	1	2	3	4	5	6	7	8	9	10	11	12	13	14	15	16	17	18	Final
Wales	0	5	5	5	5	5	5	7	8	8	8	9	12	12	12	13	15	15	15
South Africa	3	3	4	6	8	10	11	11	11	14	15	15	15	17	18	18	18	20	20
Report

=== Semifinals ===
31 July, 12:45
Team	1	2	3	4	5	6	7	8	9	10	11	12	13	14	15	16	17	Final
Jersey	1	1	2	2	3	3	3	3	4	4	5	5	6	7	9	9	9	9
South Africa	0	1	1	4	4	8	11	12	12	14	14	17	17	17	17	18	20	20
Report

31 July, 12:45
Team	1	2	3	4	5	6	7	8	9	10	11	12	13	14	15	16	17	18	Final
Northern Ireland	1	1	1	1	2	5	5	5	6	6	6	8	8	8	12	13	13	14	14
England	0	1	3	5	5	5	6	9	9	10	11	11	13	15	15	16	19	19	19
Report

=== Finals ===
==== Gold medal match ====
01 August, 08:45
Rank	Team	1	2	3	4	5	6	7	8	9	10	11	12	13	14	15	16	17	18	19	Final
1st place, gold medalist(s)	South Africa	0	4	5	7	7	7	7	8	10	11	11	11	11	11	14	14	16	17	20	20
2nd place, silver medalist(s)	England	1	1	1	1	5	6	10	10	10	10	11	12	14	16	16	17	17	17	17	17
Report

==== Bronze medal match ====
01 August, 08:45
Rank	Team	1	2	3	4	5	6	7	8	9	10	11	12	13	14	15	16	17	18	Final
4	Jersey	3	3	4	4	5	5	6	7	9	9	10	10	10	12	13	13	14	14	14
3rd place, bronze medalist(s)	Northern Ireland	0	2	2	3	3	5	5	5	5	9	9	10	12	12	12	14	14	15	15
Report
