= Mandy Cunningham =

Northern Ireland lawn bowler (born 1964)

Personal information
- Nationality: Northern Irish
- Born: 11 June 1964 (age 62) Belfast, Northern Ireland

Sport
- Sport: Lawn bowls
- Club: Ewarts BC
Medal record
Representing Northern Ireland
Women's lawn bowls
Commonwealth Games
Bronze medal – third place	2014 Glasgow	Women's pairs
Representing combined Ireland
Atlantic Bowls Championships
Bronze medal – third place	2005 Bangor	fours
Bronze medal – third place	2009 Johannesburg	fours
British Isles Championships
Gold medal – first place	2014	singles

Mandy Cunningham (born 11 June 1964) is a lawn bowler from Northern Ireland.

== Bowls career ==
In 2005 she won the fours bronze medal at the Atlantic Bowls Championships and four years later she won the fours bronze medal at the 2009 Atlantic Championships.

She competed for Northern Ireland in the women's pairs event at the 2014 Commonwealth Games where she won a bronze medal.

She won the 2011 and 2013 singles title at the Irish National Bowls Championships bowling for the Ewarts Bowls Club. After the 2013 success she subsequently won the singles at the British Isles Bowls Championships in 2014.
