= Semesa Naiseruvati =

Fijian lawn bowler

Personal information
- Born: 20 September 1963 (age 62) Vutuna, Vanua Balavu, Colony of Fiji, British Empire

Sport
- Sport: Lawn bowls
Medal record
Representing Fiji
Asia Pacific Bowls Championships
Gold medal – first place	2011 Adelaide	triples
Pacific Games
Gold medal – first place	2019 Samoa	Men's singles

Semesa Vakalelea Naiseruvati (born 20 September 1963) is a Fijian international lawn bowler.

== Bows career ==
Naiseruvati won the gold medal in the triples with Daniel Lum On and Samuela Tuikiligana at the 2011 Asia Pacific Bowls Championships in Adelaide.

He was selected to represent Fiji at the 2018 Commonwealth Games in the Gold Coast, where he competed in the triples and fours.

After winning the singles gold medal at the Lawn bowls at the 2019 Pacific Games he announced his retirement, but later changed his mind.

In 2022, he competed in the men's singles and the men's triples at the 2022 Commonwealth Games.

In 2023, he was selected as part of the team to represent Fiji at the 2023 World Outdoor Bowls Championship. He participated in the men's triples and the men's fours events.
