= Shooting at the 2014 Commonwealth Games – Men's trap =

Shooting – Men's trap at the 2014 Commonwealth Games
- Venue: Barry Buddon Shooting Centre
- Dates: 28 & 29 July 2014
- Competitors: 36 from 21 nations
- Winning score: 11

Medalists
| gold medal | Adam Vella | Australia |
| silver medal | Aaron Heading | England |
| bronze medal | Manavjit Singh Sandhu | India |

The Men's trap event took place on 28 and 29 July 2014 at the Barry Buddon Shooting Centre. There was a qualification to determine the final participants. The two rounds of qualification were held on 28 July and the last three rounds of qualification, the semifinals and the finals were held on 29 July.

== Results ==
=== Qualification ===
| Rank | Name | 1 | 2 | 3 | 4 | 5 | Points | Notes |
|---|---|---|---|---|---|---|---|---|
| 1 | Michael Diamond (AUS) | 24 | 25 | 23 | 24 | 25 | 121 | Q |
| 2 | Aaron Heading (ENG) | 23 | 24 | 25 | 23 | 24 | 119 | Q |
| 3 | Mansher Singh (IND) | 25 | 25 | 21 | 23 | 23 | 117 | Q |
| 4 | Manavjit Singh Sandhu (IND) | 25 | 24 | 25 | 24 | 19 | 117 | Q |
| 5 | Yannis Ailiotis (CYP) | 24 | 21 | 23 | 25 | 22 | 115 | Q |
| 6 | Adam Vella (AUS) | 23 | 24 | 24 | 21 | 22 | 114 | Q |
| 7 | Marios Sofocleous (CYP) | 22 | 22 | 20 | 23 | 24 | 111 | |
| 8 | Mike Wixey (WAL) | 18 | 22 | 22 | 25 | 23 | 110 | |
| 9 | Glenn Kable (FIJ) | 21 | 23 | 22 | 22 | 22 | 110 | |
| 10 | Paul Shaw (CAN) | 22 | 22 | 21 | 24 | 21 | 110 | |
| 11 | Brian Galea (MLT) | 24 | 22 | 22 | 20 | 21 | 109 | |
| 12 | Drew Shaw (CAN) | 23 | 22 | 20 | 21 | 22 | 108 | |
| 13 | Jonathan Reid (SCO) | 22 | 22 | 20 | 21 | 22 | 107 | |
| 14 | Neil Parsons (IOM) | 23 | 21 | 23 | 20 | 20 | 107 | |
| 15 | Myles Browne-Cole (NZL) | 22 | 22 | 20 | 23 | 19 | 106 | |
| 16 | David Walton (IOM) | 21 | 22 | 23 | 22 | 18 | 106 | |
| 17 | Bernard Yeoh (MAS) | 21 | 21 | 23 | 21 | 19 | 105 | |
| 18 | Jonathan Davis (WAL) | 21 | 20 | 20 | 23 | 20 | 104 | |
| 19 | John Macdonald (SCO) | 23 | 20 | 22 | 21 | 18 | 104 | |
| 20 | David Henning (NIR) | 23 | 19 | 20 | 20 | 21 | 103 | |
| 21 | Charles Chen Seong Fook (MAS) | 21 | 20 | 22 | 19 | 21 | 103 | |
| 22 | David Beattie (NIR) | 22 | 23 | 19 | 19 | 18 | 101 | |
| 23 | David Sipling (ENG) | 24 | 22 | 21 | 17 | 17 | 101 | |
| 24 | Kevin Cowles (GIB) | 23 | 19 | 16 | 20 | 20 | 98 | |
| 25 | Gary Cooper (GIB) | 19 | 17 | 20 | 23 | 18 | 97 | |
| 26 | Chris Jackson (CAY) | 22 | 20 | 20 | 19 | 16 | 97 | |
| 27 | Eddie Chan (SAM) | 21 | 17 | 19 | 19 | 19 | 95 | |
| 28 | Saul Pitaluga (FAI) | 20 | 15 | 20 | 18 | 19 | 92 | |
| 29 | Mitchell Meers (NFI) | 19 | 13 | 20 | 21 | 17 | 90 | |
| 30 | Clayton Viliamu (NIU) | 19 | 18 | 16 | 20 | 17 | 90 | |
| 31 | Paul Loibl (SAM) | 19 | 12 | 19 | 14 | 22 | 86 | |
| 32 | Shaun Barnes (JAM) | 16 | 16 | 16 | 19 | 19 | 86 | |
| 33 | Edward Sietu (NIU) | 16 | 18 | 19 | 17 | 14 | 84 | |
| 34 | Andrew Wigmore (BIZ) | 18 | 15 | 14 | 14 | 18 | 79 | |
| 35 | Bill Burton (NFI) | 16 | 16 | 14 | 16 | 17 | 79 | |
| 36 | Shaun Jaffray (FAI) | 14 | 12 | 17 | 16 | 14 | 73 | |

=== Semifinals ===
| Rank | Name | Points | Notes |
|---|---|---|---|
| 1 | Adam Vella (AUS) | 15 | QG |
| 2 | Aaron Heading (ENG) | 14 | QG |
| 3 | Manavjit Singh Sandhu (IND) | 13 | QB |
| 4 | Michael Diamond (AUS) | 12+3 | QB |
| 5 | Yannis Ailiotis (CYP) | 12+2 | |
| 6 | Mansher Singh (IND) | 11 | |

QB: Qualified to Bronze

QG: Qualified to Gold

=== Finals ===
| Rank | Name | Points | Notes |
|---|---|---|---|
| 1st place, gold medalist(s) | Adam Vella (AUS) | 11 | |
| 2nd place, silver medalist(s) | Aaron Heading (ENG) | 9 | |
| 3rd place, bronze medalist(s) | Manavjit Singh Sandhu (IND) | 11+1 | |
| 4 | Michael Diamond (AUS) | 11+0 | |
