= Tracy-Lee Botha =

South African lawn bowler (born 1988)

Personal information
- Nationality: South African
- Born: 23 November 1988 (age 37) Johannesburg, South Africa
- Height: 5 ft 5 in (165 cm)
- Weight: 66 kg (146 lb)

Sport
- Sport: Lawn bowls
Medal record
Representing South Africa
Women's lawn bowls
Commonwealth Games
Gold medal – first place	2010 Delhi	Women's triples
Gold medal – first place	2014 Glasgow	Women's pairs
Gold medal – first place	2014 Glasgow	Women's fours
Atlantic Bowls Championships
Silver medal – second place	2011 Paphos	pairs

Tracy-Lee Botha (born 23 November 1988) is a South African lawn bowler.

== Bowls career ==
In 2011 she won the pairs silver medal at the Atlantic Bowls Championships.

She competed in the women's pairs and the women's fours events at the 2014 Commonwealth Games where she won two gold medals.

She was selected as part of the South Africa team for the 2018 Commonwealth Games on the Gold Coast in Queensland.
