= Cycling at the 2014 Commonwealth Games – Men's cross-country =

Cycling – Men's cross-country at the 2014 Commonwealth Games
- Venue: Cathkin Braes Mountain Bike Trails
- Dates: 29 July 2014
- Competitors: 35 from 19 nations
- Winning time: 1:38.26

Medalists
gold medal	Anton Cooper	New Zealand
silver medal	Sam Gaze	New Zealand
bronze medal	Daniel McConnell	Australia

The men's cross country mountain biking competition at the 2014 Commonwealth Games in Glasgow, Scotland was held on 29 July at the Cathkin Braes Mountain Bike Trails. Mountain biking returned to the program, after last being competed back in 2006.

== Schedule ==
All times are British Summer Time

Date	Time	Round
Tuesday 29 July 2014	15:01	Final

== Result ==
Final results:

Rank	Rider	Time
1st place, gold medalist(s)	Anton Cooper (NZL)	1:38:26
2nd place, silver medalist(s)	Sam Gaze (NZL)	1:38:29
3rd place, bronze medalist(s)	Daniel McConnell (AUS)	1:38:36
4	Max Plaxton (CAN)	1:38:49
5	Grant Ferguson (SCO)	1:41:35
6	Liam Killeen (ENG)	1:41:57
7	Raphaël Gagné (CAN)	1:43:03
8	Cameron Ivory (AUS)	1:43:20
9	Paul Oldham (ENG)	1:43:29
10	Kenta Gallagher (SCO)	1:43:45
11	Gareth Montgomerie (SCO)	1:46:28
12	Andrew Blair (AUS)	1:48:16
13	Philip Buys (RSA)	1:48:34
14	James Roe (GUE)	1:50:46
15	Yannick Lincoln (MRI)	1:51:23
16	Marios Athanasiadis (CYP)	1:52:42
17	Elliot Baxter (IOM)	1:53:06
18	Heiko Redecker (NAM)	1:53:44
19	Rhys Hidrio (JER)	LAP
20	Christos Loizou (CYP)	LAP
21	Phetetso Monese (LES)	LAP
22	Richard Tanguy (JER)	LAP
23	James Patterson (JER)	LAP
24	Samson Gichuru (KEN)	LAP
25	Michael Serafin (GUE)	LAP
26	Roger Robert Aiken (NIR)	LAP
27	Sebastien Tyack (MRI)	LAP
28	Teboho Khantsi (LES)	LAP
29	Antony Muite (KEN)	LAP
30	Robert Barnes (JAM)	LAP
31	William Kelly (SWZ)	LAP
32	Benard Kabiro (KEN)	LAP
33	Moshoeshoe Khumalo (SWZ)	LAP
	Leonard Tsoyo (MAW)	DNS
	Missi Kathumba (MAW)	DNS
