= Daniel Lum On =

Fijian lawn bowler

Personal information
- Born: 5 October 1962 (age 63) Suva, Colony of Fiji, British Empire

Sport
- Sport: Lawn bowls
Medal record
Representing Fiji
Asia Pacific Bowls Championships
Gold medal – first place	2011 Adelaide	triples

Daniel Lum On (born 1962) is a Fijian international lawn bowler.

== Bows career ==
Lum On won the gold medal in the triples with Semesa Naiseruvati and Samuela Tuikiligana at the 2011 Asia Pacific Bowls Championships in Adelaide.

He was selected to represent Fiji at the 2014 Commonwealth Games, where he competed in the triples and fours events.
