= Muhammad Hizlee Abdul Rais =

Malaysian lawn bowler

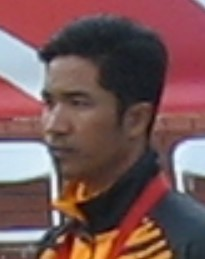
- Rais at the 2014 Commonwealth Games

Personal information
- Nationality: Malaysian
- Born: 23 February 1989 (age 37) Kuala Lumpur, Malaysia

Sport
- Sport: Lawn bowls
- Event(s): Men's singles Men's pairs

Achievements and titles
- Highest world ranking: 22 (September 2024)
Medal record
Representing Malaysia
Men's lawn bowls
Commonwealth Games
Silver medal – second place	2014 Glasgow	Men's pairs
World Singles Champion of Champions
Gold medal – first place	2012 Cyprus	Men's Singles
Asia Pacific Bowls Championships
Bronze medal – third place	2011 Adelaide	fours
Silver medal – second place	2015 Christchurch	pairs
Bronze medal – third place	2015 Christchurch	singles
Bronze medal – third place	2019 Gold Coast	triples
Bronze medal – third place	2019 Gold Coast	fours
Hong Kong International Bowls Classic
Gold medal – first place	2023	pairs
Southeast Asian Games
Gold medal – first place	2017 Kuala Lumpur	pairs
Asian Lawn Bowls Championship
Gold medal – first place	2014 Shenzhen	fours
Gold medal – first place	2017 New Delhi	pairs
Gold medal – first place	2023 Kuala Lumpur	fours

Muhammad Hizlee Abdul Rais (born 23 February 1989) is a Malaysian lawn bowler.

== Bowls career ==
=== World Championships ===
Rais was selected by the Malaysian national team, to represent them at the sport's blue riband event, the 2023 World Bowls Championship. He participated in the men's triples and the men's fours events. The Malaysian team ranked seventh in the world at the start of the tournament, were given the target of reaching the semi finals. In the triples, his team reached the quarter final before losing to Ireland.

=== Commonwealth Games ===
Rais competed in both the men's singles and the men's pairs events at the 2014 Commonwealth Games. He failed to qualify from the group stages in the men's singles event, but won a silver medal in the men's pairs

=== Other events ===
In 2012 he became the World Singles Champion of Champions defeating Stanley Lai of Hong Kong in the final.

Rais has won five medals at the Asia Pacific Bowls Championships, including a double bronze the 2019 Asia Pacific Bowls Championships in the Gold Coast, Queensland and a gold medal in the Lawn bowls at the 2017 Southeast Asian Games.

In 2023, he won the fours gold medal at the 14th Asian Lawn Bowls Championship in Kuala Lumpur before sealing a gold medal in the pairs with Izzat Dzulkeple, at the Hong Kong International Bowls Classic.
