= Samuela Tuikiligana =

Fijian international lawn bowler (born 1958)

Personal information
- Born: 17 April 1958 (age 68) Lakeba, Colony of Fiji, British Empire

Sport
- Club: Suva BC
Medal record
Representing Fiji
World Outdoor Championships
Silver medal – second place	2008 Christchurch	Men's triples
Asia Pacific Bowls Championships
Gold medal – first place	2011 Adelaide	triples

Samuela Tuikiligana (born 1958) is a Fijian international lawn bowler.

In 2008 he won the silver medal in the triples at the 2008 World Outdoor Bowls Championship in Christchurch along with Curtis Mar and Keshwa Goundar.

He won the gold medal in the triples with Semesa Naiseruvati and Daniel Lum On at the 2011 Asia Pacific Bowls Championships in Adelaide.
