= Peter Jüni =

Swiss physician

Peter Jüni FESC

Scientific Director of the Ontario COVID-19 Science Advisory Table
- In office July 2020 – May 2022

Personal details
- Education: Bern University
- Scientific career
- Fields: Cardiology; epidemiology
- Workplaces: Bern University; St Michael's Hospital; University of Toronto

Peter Jüni FESC is a Swiss physician, general internist, and epidemiologist based in England.

He was previously both a member of, and the scientific director of, the Ontario COVID-19 Science Advisory Table, and also a director of a research centre at St Michael's Hospital in Toronto.

He is a fellow of the European Society of Cardiology, and a Tier 1 Canada Research Chair in Clinical Epidemiology of Chronic Diseases.

== Early life and education ==
Jüni was born just outside of Bern, Switzerland.

He graduated from Bern University with a degree in medicine, specialised in internal medicine, and was a Research Fellow at University of Bristol in the Department of Social Medicine.

== Career ==
After his research, Jüni returned to the University Bern, where he founded their clinical trials unit in 2007 and became Director of the Institute of Social and Preventive Medicine in 2013.

In 2016, e moved to Toronto, and joined St Michael's Hospital and was appointed professor of medicine at the University of Toronto. Jüni was the director of the Applied Health Research Centre (AHRC) at the Li Ka Shing Knowledge Institute and the Canada Research Chair in Clinical Epidemiology of Chronic Diseases.

Jüni was part of the Ontario COVID-19 Science Advisory Table, sitting on the Drugs & Biologics Clinical Practice Guidelines Working Group, and serving as the Scientific Director from July 2020 to May 2022. During his time at the advisory table, he participated on the table's Modelling Consensus Table, and recommended better protections and paid sick days for the front-line workers who were disproportionately impacted by the disease. He also criticised of the Ontario provincial government's response to the pandemic and has stated that "the government continues to ignore the advice of experts." After leaving the advisory table, Jüni took a job at Oxford University, in England. Jüni is a fellow of the European Society of Cardiology.

== Research ==
Jüni has published over 300 scientific papers in the fields of cardiology and epidemiology, for which he has been recognized as a Highly Cited Researcher by Thomson Reuters. He has previously performed cardiovascular research funded by AstraZeneca, Biotronik, Biosensors International, Eli Lilly and Company, and The Medicines Company, and has acted as an advisor to Amgen, AVA Pharmaceuticals, and Fresenius. He has further acted as an unpaid member of steering groups or executive committees of clinical trials for Abbott Vascular, St. Jude Medical, and Terumo.

Jüni was a principal investigator on a study called Coagulopathy of COVID-19: a Pragmatic Randomized Controlled Trial of Therapeutic Anticoagulation versus Standard Care funded by a joint grant from Defence Research and Development Canada, the Department of National Defence, St. Michael's Hospital Foundation, St. Joseph's Health Centre Foundation, and the International Network of Venous Thromboembolism Clinical Research Networks (INVENT).

He is an investigator for a study to evaluate favipiravir for potential chemoprophylaxis against COVID-19 in long-term care facilities, sponsored by Appili Therapeutics.

Jüni is a co-investigator in a research project titled From idea to reality: COVID-19 Vaccination for Children and Youth, taking place between June 2021 and May 2022. Funded by the Canadian Institutes of Health Research, the intended outcome of the study is to examine vaccine safety and efficacy of COVID-19 vaccines in children and youth, to provide confidence to parents considering vaccinating their children, and increase vaccine uptake. A continuation of the study was funded in December 2021, with the expanded goal of applying previously gathered data to "enhance COVID-19 vaccine acceptability, curtail vaccine hesitancy, and promote equitable vaccine distribution." He is also a co-investigator on a study titled Identifying strategies to (re)build trust in Canadian social institutions and increase public acceptance of COVID-19 countermeasures.

== Personal life ==
Jüni is married, and has four children.
