= Willem Esterhuizen =

Namibian lawn bowler (1985–2020)

Willem Esterhuizen Jr.
Personal information
- Nationality: Namibian
- Born: 8 August 1985 Windhoek, Namibia
- Died: 9 January 2020 (aged 34)

Sport
- Sport: Lawn bowls
Medal record
Representing Namibia
Atlantic Bowls Championships
Bronze medal – third place	2019 Cardiff	triples

Willem Erasmus Esterhuizen Jr. (1985–2020) was an international lawn bowler from Namibia.

== Bowls career ==
Esterhuizen represented Namibia at four Commonwealth Games; in 2006, 2010, 2014 and 2018. before his untimely death.

In 2019 Esterhuizen won the triples bronze medal at the Atlantic Bowls Championships.

He died in 2020.

His father (also named Willem Erasmus Esterhuizen, born 9 March 1952) competed at the 1998, 2002 & 2006 Commonwealth Games and his mother (Deborah J Esterhuizen, born 11 May 1951) represented Namibia at the 1998 Commonwealth Games.
