= Namibia at the 2014 Commonwealth Games =

- CG code: NAM
- CGA: Namibian National Olympic Committee

in Glasgow, Scotland
- Flag bearer: Helalia Johannes
- Medals Ranked 26th: Gold 0 Silver 1 Bronze 2 Total 3

Commonwealth Games appearances (overview)
- 1994; 1998; 2002; 2006; 2010; 2014; 2018; 2022; 2026; 2030

Namibia competed in the 2014 Commonwealth Games in Glasgow, Scotland from July 23 to August 3, 2014.

== Athletics ==
Men

Athlete	Event	Heat		Semifinal		Final	
Athlete	Event	Result	Rank	Result	Rank	Result	Rank
Namupala Reonard	Marathon	—N/a				did not finish	

Athlete	Event	Qualification		Final	
Athlete	Event	Distance	Rank	Distance	Rank
Etchegaray Nguluwe	Discus throw (F42/44)	—N/a		28.88 PB	12

Women

Athlete	Event	Heat		Semifinal		Final	
Athlete	Event	Result	Rank	Result	Rank	Result	Rank
Lahja Ishitile; David Ndeilenga (guide)	100 m (T12)	13.40 SB	2 q	—N/a		13.48	3rd place, bronze medalist(s)
Johanna Katjikuru	100 m (T12)	15.38 SB	4	—N/a		did not advance	
Helalia Johannes	Marathon	—N/a				2:32:02	5
Beata Naigambo	Marathon	—N/a				2:35.21	10
Leena Ekandjo	Marathon	—N/a				did not finish	

Athlete	Event	Qualification		Final	
Athlete	Event	Distance	Position	Distance	Position
Johanna Benson	Long jump (F37/38)	—N/a		3.82 PB	3rd place, bronze medalist(s)

== Cycling ==
=== Mountain biking ===
Athlete	Event	Time	Rank
Heiko Redecker	Men's cross-country	1:53.44	18
Vera Adrian	Women's cross-country	LAP	16

=== Road ===
Men

Athlete	Event	Time	Rank
Dan Craven	Road race	4:22:08	9

Women

Athlete	Event	Time	Rank
Vera Adrian	Road race	DNF	
Vera Adrian	Time trial	50:21.56	27
Irene Steyn	Road race	DNF	
Irene Steyn	Time trial	51:16.04	28

== Shooting ==
Women
Shotgun

Athlete	Event	Qualification		Semifinals		Final/BM	
Athlete	Event	Points	Rank	Points	Rank	Points	Rank
Gaby Diana Ahrens	Trap	63	12	did not advance			

== Triathlon ==
Athlete	Event	Swim (1.5 km)	Bike (40 km)	Run (10 km)	Total Time	Rank
Drikus Coetzee	Men's	20:54	1:05:14	41:15	2:08:23	25

== Weightlifting ==
Powerlifting

Athlete	Event	Total	Rank
Ruben Soroseb	Men's +72 kg	167.4	6

== Wrestling ==
Men's freestyle

Athlete	Event	Round of 32	Round of 16	Quarterfinal	Semifinal	Repechage	Final / BM	
Athlete	Event	Opposition Result	Opposition Result	Opposition Result	Opposition Result	Opposition Result	Opposition Result	Rank
Angula Shikongo	−97 kg	—N/a	Rattigan (ENG); L 2-6	did not advance				
