= Jersey at the 2014 Commonwealth Games =

- CGF code: JEY
- CGA: Commonwealth Games Association of Jersey
- Website: cgaj.org

in Glasgow, Scotland
- Competitors: 40
- Flag bearer: Steve Le Couilliard
- Medals: Gold 0 Silver 0 Bronze 0 Total 0

Commonwealth Games appearances (overview)
- 1958; 1962; 1966; 1970; 1974; 1978; 1982; 1986; 1990; 1994; 1998; 2002; 2006; 2010; 2014; 2018; 2022; 2026; 2030

Jersey competed in the 2014 Commonwealth Games in Glasgow, Scotland from 23 July to 3 August 2014.

== Athletics ==
Men

Athlete	Event	Qualification		Final	
Athlete	Event	Distance	Rank	Distance	Rank
Simon Phelan	High jump	2.06	22	Did not advance	
Zane Duquemin	Shot put	18.90	9 q	18.16	9
Zane Duquemin	Discus throw	57.26	12 q	59.39	8

Women

Athlete	Event	Qualification		Final	
Athlete	Event	Distance	Position	Distance	Position
Shadine Duquemin	Discus throw	48.77	14	Did not advance	

== Badminton ==
Mixed team

Pool F

Pos	Team	Pld	W	L	GF	GA	GD	PF	PA	PD	Pts	Qualification
1	England	3	3	0	30	1	+29	638	305	+333	3	Quarterfinals
2	Jersey	3	2	1	20	12	+8	558	518	+40	2	
3	Northern Ireland	3	1	2	11	23	−12	528	629	−101	1	
4	Mauritius	3	0	3	4	29	−25	412	684	−272	0	

Source: glasgow2014.com

Mauritius
0
Commonwealth Arena, Glasgow
24 July

Jersey
5

			1	2	3
1	(Mauritius) (Jersey)	Yeldy Louison / Sahir Edoo; Alexander Hutchings / Mariana Agathangelou	10; 21	9; 21
2	(Mauritius) (Jersey)	Julien Paul; Mark Constable	9; 21	10; 21
3	(Mauritius) (Jersey)	Kate Foo Kune; Elizabeth Cann	12; 21	18; 21
4	(Mauritius) (Jersey)	Julien Paul / Aatish Lubah; Mark Constable / Alexander Hutchings	19; 21	22; 20	18; 21
5	(Mauritius) (Jersey)	Kate Foo Kune / Yeldy Louison; Elizabeth Cann / Mariana Agathangelou	10; 21	6; 21

England
5
Commonwealth Arena, Glasgow
25 July

Jersey
0

			1	2	3
1	(England) (Jersey)	Chris Langridge / Heather Olver; Mark Constable / Mariana Agathangelou	21; 7	21; 13
2	(England) (Jersey)	Rajiv Ouseph; Alexander Hutchings	21; 8	21; 8
3	(England) (Jersey)	Sarah Walker; Elizabeth Cann	21; 15	21; 13
4	(England) (Jersey)	Chris Adcock / Andrew Ellis; Mark Constable / Alexander Hutchings	21; 7	21; 12
5	(England) (Jersey)	Lauren Smith / Gabby Adcock; Solen Pasturel / Mariana Agathangelou	21; 8	21; 10

Jersey
5
Commonwealth Arena, Glasgow
26 July

Northern Ireland
0

			1	2	3
1	(Jersey) (Northern Ireland)	Alexander Hutchings / Mariana Agathangelou; Ciaran Chambers / Sinead Chambers	21; 14	21; 16
2	(Jersey) (Northern Ireland)	Mark Constable; Tony Stephenson	21; 16	21; 8
3	(Jersey) (Northern Ireland)	Elizabeth Cann; Alannah Stephenson	21; 12	21; 15
4	(Jersey) (Northern Ireland)	Alexander Hutchings / Mark Constable; Ciaran Chambers / Tony Murphy	21; 18	17; 21	21; 18
5	(Jersey) (Northern Ireland)	Elizabeth Cann / Mariana Agathangelou; Sinead Chambers / Caroline Black	21; 9	21; 18

== Cycling ==
=== Mountain biking ===
Athlete	Event	Time	Rank
Rhys Hidrio	Men's cross-country	LAP	19
James Patterson	Men's cross-country	LAP	23
Richard Tanguy	Men's cross-country	LAP	22

== Gymnastics ==
Artistic

Women's

Athlete	Vault	Uneven Bars	Balance Beam	Floor	Overall	Rank
Charlotte Pollard	12.600	9.766	10.366	11.266	43.988	33

== Shooting ==
Men
Pistol/Small bore

Athlete	Event	Qualification		Final	
Athlete	Event	Points	Rank	Points	Rank
David Turner	10 m air rifle	606.9	14	Did not advance	
George Winstanley	25 m rapid fire pistol	525	9	Did not advance	
Richard John Bouchard	50 m rifle prone	606.1	24	Did not advance	
Stephen Le Couilliard	50 m rifle prone	Did not finish	40	Did not advance	

Full bore

Athlete	Event	Stage 1	Stage 2	Stage 3	Total	
Athlete	Event	Points	Points	Points	Points	Rank
Barry le Cheminant	Individual	104-10v	150-22v	136-8v	390-40v	7
Dan Richardson	Individual	104-12v	150-18v	130-9v	384-39v	16
Barry le Cheminant; Dan Richardson	Pairs	298-37v	287-20v	—	585-57v	5

Women
Pistol/Small bore

Athlete	Event	Qualification		Final	
Athlete	Event	Points	Rank	Points	Rank
Ling Chiao Nicole Tan	10 metre air pistol	372	14	Did not advance	
Nicola Holmes	25 m pistol	551	15	Did not advance	

== Swimming ==
Men

Athlete	Event	Heat		Semifinal		Final	
Athlete	Event	Time	Rank	Time	Rank	Time	Rank
Tom Gallichan	50 m freestyle	23.97	26	Did not advance			
Tom Gallichan	100 m freestyle	52.00	23	Did not advance			
Tom Gallichan	200 m freestyle	1:58.01	27	—		Did not advance	
Tom Gallichan	50 m backstroke	27.19	16 Q	27.16	16	Did not advance	
Tom Gallichan	100 m backstroke	58.92	19	Did not advance			
Tom Gallichan	200 m backstroke	2:09.15	11	—		Did not advance	
Ian Black	50 m breaststroke	28.64	13 Q	28.87	=12	Did not advance	
Ian Black	100 m breaststroke	1:04.43	15 Q	1:04.00	14	Did not advance	
Tom Gallichan	50 m butterfly	25.34	17	Did not advance			

== Triathlon ==
Athlete	Event	Swim (1.5 km)	Bike (40 km)	Run (10 km)	Total Time	Rank
Daniel Halksworth	Men's	18:09	59:33	36:14	1:54:53	17
Thomas Perchard	Men's	20:50	1:05:14	37:10	2:04:16	24
