= Australia at the 2014 Commonwealth Games =

- CG code: AUS
- CGA: Australian Commonwealth Games Association
- Website: commonwealthgames.org.au

in Glasgow, Scotland
- Competitors: 409
- Flag bearers: Opening: Anna Meares; Closing: Mark Knowles
- Officials: 184
- Medals Ranked 2nd: Gold 49 Silver 42 Bronze 46 Total 137

Commonwealth Games appearances (overview)
- 1930; 1934; 1938; 1950; 1954; 1958; 1962; 1966; 1970; 1974; 1978; 1982; 1986; 1990; 1994; 1998; 2002; 2006; 2010; 2014; 2018; 2022; 2026; 2030

Australia competed at the 2014 Commonwealth Games in Glasgow, Scotland, between 23 July and 3 August 2014.

It was the nation's 20th appearance at the Commonwealth Games, having competed at every Games since their inception in 1930. 417 athletes competed for Australia, the largest team at the competition, just ahead of England with 416 athletes. It is also the greatest number of athletes to represent Australia at any Commonwealth Games.

== Administration ==
In 2013, Steve Moneghetti was appointed as Chef de Mission, a position he held at the 2010 Commonwealth Games. Dianne Gallagher was appointed as Team General Manager. Brian Roe was appointed as Assistant Team General Manager, Dr Grace Bryant OAM as Team Medical Director and Ian Hanson as Team Media Director.

Section Managers

- Nathan Sims (Athletics), Rhonda Cator (Badminton), Allan Nicolson Snr (Boxing), Paul Brosnan (Cycling), Michael Hetherington (Diving), Adam Sachs (Gymnastics), Andrew Smith (Hockey Men), Ben Tarbox (Hockey Women), Marie (Midge) Hill (Judo), Peter Brown (Lawn Bowls), Julie Richardson (Netball), Luca Liussi (Rugby 7s), Tim Mahon (Shooting), Michael Scott ( (Swimming), Scott Houston (Table Tennis), Bernard Savage (Triathlon), Robert Mitchell (Weightlifting), Alan Landy (Wrestling)

Medical

- Doctors: Dr Michael Makdissi, Dr Sandra Mejak, Dr Hugh Seward and Dr Greg Lovell
- Physiotherapists: Peter Blanch (Head), Keren Faulkner, Jon Davis, Kylie Holt, Andrew McGough and Paula Peralta
- Soft Tissue Therapists: Tony Bond (Head), Howard Arbthnot, Stuart Hinds, Delwyn Griffith, Georgette (Georgie) Stephens and Natasha Brock
- Clinic Administrator: Linda Philpot

Administration

- Athlete Liaison Officer: Petria Thomas OAM
- Administration Officers: Rohan Short, Andrew Matthews, Dianne O'Neill, Carol Grant, Robyn Shaw
- Administration Assistants: Amy Handley, Tim Arnold, Peter Tate, Cathy Perre, Emma Whitelaw

Media

- Media Officers: Len Johnson, Tracy Parish, Lachlan Searle and David Moase

== Medallists ==
Medal	Name	Sport	Event	Date
Gold	Jack Bobridge; Luke Davison; Alex Edmondson; Glenn O'Shea	Cycling	Men's team pursuit	24 July
Gold	Anna Meares	Cycling	Women's 500 m time trial	24 July
Gold	Rowan Crothers	Swimming	Men's 100 m freestyle S9	24 July
Gold	Emma McKeon	Swimming	Women's 200 m freestyle	24 July
Gold	Bronte Campbell; Cate Campbell; Alicia Coutts*; Brittany Elmslie*; Madeline Groves*; Emma McKeon; Melanie Schlanger	Swimming	Women's 4 × 100 m freestyle relay	24 July
Gold	Jack Bobridge	Cycling	Men's individual pursuit	25 July
Gold	Laura Coles	Shooting	Women's skeet	25 July
Gold	Thomas Fraser-Holmes	Swimming	Men's 200 m freestyle	25 July
Gold	Matthew Abood; Tommaso D'Orsogna; Jayden Hadler*; James Magnussen; Cameron McEvoy; Neil McKendry*; Kenneth To*	Swimming	Men's 4 × 100 m freestyle relay	25 July
Gold	Maddison Elliott	Swimming	Women's 100 m freestyle S8	25 July
Gold	Leiston Pickett	Swimming	Women's 50 m breaststroke	25 July
Gold	Scott Sunderland	Cycling	Men's time trial	26 July
Gold	Annette Edmondson	Cycling	Women's scratch race	26 July
Gold	Daniel Repacholi	Shooting	Men's 10 m air pistol	26 July
Gold	Daniel Fox	Swimming	Men's 200 m freestyle S14	26 July
Gold	Emily Seebohm	Swimming	Women's 100 m backstroke	26 July
Gold	Taylor McKeown	Swimming	Women's 200 m breaststroke	26 July
Gold	Bronte Barratt; Alicia Coutts; Brittany Elmslie; Remy Fairweather*; Emma McKeon; Madeline Groves*	Swimming	Women's 4 × 200 m freestyle relay	26 July
Gold	Michael Shelley	Athletics	Men's marathon	27 July
Gold	Jodi Elkington	Athletics	Women's long jump (F37/38)	27 July
Gold	Matthew Glaetzer	Cycling	Men's keirin	27 July
Gold	Stephanie Morton	Cycling	Women's sprint	27 July
Gold	James Magnussen	Swimming	Men's 100 m freestyle	27 July
Gold	Ben Treffers	Swimming	Men's 50 m backstroke	27 July
Gold	Thomas Fraser-Holmes; Mack Horton*; Cameron McEvoy; Neil McKendry; David McKeon	Swimming	Men's 4 × 200 m freestyle relay	27 July
Gold	Belinda Hocking	Swimming	Women's 200 m backstroke	27 July
Gold	Warren Potent	Shooting	Men's 50 m rifle prone	28 July
Gold	Laetisha Scanlan	Shooting	Women's trap	28 July
Gold	Mitch Larkin	Swimming	Men's 200 m backstroke	28 July
Gold	Cate Campbell	Swimming	Women's 100 m freestyle	28 July
Gold	David Chapman	Shooting	Men's 25 m rapid fire pistol	29 July
Gold	Adam Vella	Shooting	Men's trap	29 July
Gold	Daniel Tranter	Swimming	Men's 200 m individual medley	29 July
Gold	Bronte Campbell*; Cate Campbell; Alicia Coutts*; Belinda Hocking*; Sally Hunter*; Emma McKeon; Emily Seebohm; Lorna Tonks	Swimming	Women's 4 × 100 m medley relay	29 July
Gold	Kim Mickle	Athletics	Women's javelin throw	30 July
Gold	Angela Ballard	Athletics	Women's 1500 metres (T54)	31 July
Gold	Sally Pearson	Athletics	Women's 100 m hurdles	1 August
Gold	Eleanor Patterson	Athletics	Women's high jump	1 August
Gold	Dani Samuels	Athletics	Women's discus throw	1 August
Gold	Domonic Bedggood; Matthew Mitcham	Diving	Men's 10 m synchronised platform	1 August
Gold	Alana Boyd	Athletics	Women's pole vault	2 August
Gold	Andrew Moloney	Boxing	Men's flyweight	2 August
Gold	Shelley Watts	Boxing	Women's lightweight	2 August
Gold	Esther Qin	Diving	Women's 3 m springboard	2 August
Gold	Australia women's national field hockey team: Madonna Blyth; Edwina Bone; Jane Claxton; Casey Eastham; Anna Flanagan; Kate Jenner; Jodie Kenny; Rachael Lynch; Karri McMahon; Georgia Nanscawen; Ashleigh Nelson; Georgie Parker; Brooke Peris; Emily Smith; Jayde Taylor; Kellie White	Hockey	Women's tournament	2 August
Gold	Australia men's national field hockey team: Daniel Beale; Kiel Brown; Andrew Charter; Chris Ciriello; Matthew Gohdes; Kieran Govers; Fergus Kavanagh; Mark Knowles; Trent Mitton; Eddie Ockenden; Simon Orchard; Andrew Philpott; Matthew Swann; Jake Whetton; Tristan White; Aran Zalewski	Hockey	Men's tournament	3 August
Gold	Australia national netball team: Caitlin Bassett; Tegan Caldwell; Bianca Chatfield; Julie Corletto; Laura Geitz; Kimberlee Green; Renae Hallinan; Sharni Layton; Natalie Medhurst; Kimberley Ravaillion; Madison Robinson; Caitlin Thwaites	Netball	Women's tournament	3 August
Gold	David Palmer; Cameron Pilley	Squash	Men's doubles	3 August
Gold	Rachael Grinham; David Palmer	Squash	Mixed doubles	3 August
Silver	Stephanie Morton	Cycling	Women's 500 m time trial	24 July
Silver	Matthew Cowdrey	Swimming	Men's 100 m freestyle S9	24 July
Silver	David McKeon	Swimming	Men's 400 m freestyle	24 July
Silver	Alex Edmondson	Cycling	Men's individual pursuit	25 July
Silver	Annette Edmondson	Cycling	Women's individual pursuit	25 July
Silver	Kieran Modra; Jason Niblett (pilot)	Cycling	Men's tandem time trial B	25 July
Silver	Cameron McEvoy	Swimming	Men's 200 m freestyle	25 July
Silver	Mitch Larkin	Swimming	Men's 100 m backstroke	25 July
Silver	Thomas Fraser-Holmes	Swimming	Men's 400 m individual medley	25 July
Silver	Kieran Modra; Jason Niblett (pilot)	Cycling	Men's tandem sprint B	26 July
Silver	Amy Cure	Cycling	Women's scratch race	26 July
Silver	Grant Irvine	Swimming	Men's 200 m butterfly	26 July
Silver	Cate Campbell	Swimming	Women's 50 m freestyle	26 July
Silver	Sally Hunter	Swimming	Women's 200 m breaststroke	26 July
Silver	Glenn O'Shea	Cycling	Men's scratch race	27 July
Silver	Anna Meares	Cycling	Women's sprint	27 July
Silver	Cameron McEvoy	Swimming	Men's 100 m freestyle	27 July
Silver	Mitch Larkin	Swimming	Men's 50 m backstroke	27 July
Silver	Emily Seebohm	Swimming	Women's 200 m backstroke	27 July
Silver	Madeleine Scott	Swimming	Women's 100 m breaststroke SB9	27 July
Silver	Alicia Coutts	Swimming	Women's 200 m individual medley	27 July
Silver	Josh Beaver	Swimming	Men's 200 m backstroke	28 July
Silver	Jesse Aungles	Swimming	Men's 200 m individual medley SM8	28 July
Silver	Bronte Campbell	Swimming	Women's 100 m freestyle	28 July
Silver	Lorna Tonks	Swimming	Women's 100 m breaststroke	28 July
Silver	Georgia Rose Brown; Larissa Miller; Lauren Mitchell; Mary Anne Monckton; Olivia Vivian	Gymnastics	Women's artistic team all-around	29 July
Silver	Cameron McEvoy	Swimming	Men's 50 m freestyle	29 July
Silver	Mack Horton	Swimming	Men's 1500 m freestyle	29 July
Silver	Josh Beaver*; Tommaso D'Orsogna*; Jayden Hadler; Mitch Larkin; James Magnussen; Cameron McEvoy*; Christian Sprenger; Kenneth To*	Swimming	Men's 4 × 100 m medley relay	29 July
Silver	Katherine Downie	Swimming	Women's 200 m individual medley SM10	29 July
Silver	Simplice Ribouem	Weightlifting	Men's 94 kg	29 July
Silver	Matthew Mitcham	Diving	Men's 1 m springboard	30 July
Silver	Kurt Fearnley	Athletics	Men's 1500 metres (T54)	31 July
Silver	Rohan Dennis	Cycling	Men's road time trial	31 July
Silver	Larissa Miller	Gymnastics	Women's uneven bars	31 July
Silver	Kelsey Cottrell; Karen Murphy; Lynsey Clarke	Lawn bowls	Women's triples	31 July
Silver	Matthew Mitcham; Grant Nel	Diving	Men's 3 m synchronised springboard	1 August
Silver	Maddison Keeney	Diving	Women's 1 m springboard	1 August
Silver	Lauren Mitchell	Gymnastics	Women's floor	1 August
Silver	Mary-Anne Monckton	Gymnastics	Women's balance beam	1 August
Silver	Joseph Goodall	Boxing	Men's super heavyweight	2 August
Silver	Jian Fang Lay; Miao Miao	Table tennis	Women's doubles	2 August
Bronze	Matthew Glaetzer; Nathan Hart; Shane Perkins	Cycling	Men's team sprint	24 July
Bronze	Brandie O'Connor; Breanna Hargreave (pilot)	Cycling	Women's tandem sprint B	24 July
Bronze	Amy Meyer	Judo	Women's 48 kg	24 July
Bronze	Chloe Rayner	Judo	Women's 48 kg	24 July
Bronze	Brenden Hall	Swimming	Men's 100 m freestyle S9	24 July
Bronze	Bronte Barratt	Swimming	Women's 200 m freestyle	24 July
Bronze	Keryn McMaster	Swimming	Women's 400 m individual medley	24 July
Bronze	Amy Cure	Cycling	Women's individual pursuit	25 July
Bronze	Jake Benstead	Judo	Men's 73 kg	25 July
Bronze	Jake Andrewartha	Judo	Men's +100 kg	26 July
Bronze	Josh Beaver	Swimming	Men's 100 m backstroke	25 July
Bronze	Lakeisha Patterson	Swimming	Women's 100 m freestyle S8	25 July
Bronze	Emma McKeon	Swimming	Women's 100 m butterfly	25 July
Bronze	Paul Kennedy; Thomas Clarke (pilot)	Cycling	Men's tandem sprint B	26 July
Bronze	Tony Scott; Bruce Jones; Joy Forster; Peter Scott	Lawn bowls	Mixed para-sport pairs	26 July
Bronze	Lalita Yauhleuskaya	Shooting	Women's 25 m pistol	26 July
Bronze	Bronte Campbell	Swimming	Women's 50 m freestyle	26 July
Bronze	Belinda Hocking	Swimming	Women's 100 m backstroke	26 July
Bronze	Ryan Bailie; Emma Jackson; Emma Moffatt; Aaron Royle	Triathlon	Mixed relay	26 July
Bronze	Jessica Trengove	Athletics	Women's marathon	27 July
Bronze	Brandie O'Connor; Breanna Hargreave (pilot)	Cycling	Women's tandem time trial B	27 July
Bronze	Australia national rugby union team (sevens): Cameron Clark; Tom Cusack; Pama Fou; Con Foley; Liam Gill; Greg Jeloudev; Tom Lucas; Sean McMahon; Sam Mayers; James Stannard	Rugby sevens	Men's event	27 July
Bronze	Tommaso D'Orsogna	Swimming	Men's 100 m freestyle	27 July
Bronze	Brittany Elmslie	Swimming	Women's 50 m butterfly	27 July
Bronze	Miao Miao; Jian Fang Lay; Ziyu Zhang	Table tennis	Women's team	27 July
Bronze	François Etoundi	Weightlifting	Men's 77 kg	27 July
Bronze	Daniel Repacholi	Shooting	Men's 50 m pistol	28 July
Bronze	Matson Lawson	Swimming	Men's 200 m backstroke	28 July
Bronze	Christian Sprenger	Swimming	Men's 50 m breaststroke	28 July
Bronze	Blake Cochrane	Swimming	Men's 200 m individual medley SM8	28 July
Bronze	Emma McKeon	Swimming	Women's 100 m freestyle	28 July
Bronze	Madeline Groves	Swimming	Women's 200 m butterfly	28 July
Bronze	Daniel McConnell	Cycling	Men's cross-country	29 July
Bronze	Rebecca Henderson	Cycling	Women's cross-country	29 July
Bronze	James Magnussen	Swimming	Men's 50 m freestyle	29 July
Bronze	Bronte Barratt	Swimming	Women's 400 m freestyle	29 July
Bronze	Kelsey-Lee Roberts	Athletics	Women's javelin throw	30 July
Bronze	Grant Nel	Diving	Men's 1 m springboard	30 July
Bronze	Annabelle Smith; Maddison Keeney	Diving	Women's synchronised 3 m springboard	30 July
Bronze	Katrin Garfoot	Cycling	Women's road time trial	31 July
Bronze	Damon Kelly	Weightlifting	Men's +105 kg	31 July
Bronze	Esther Qin	Diving	Women's 1 m springboard	1 August
Bronze	Aron Sherriff	Lawn bowls	Men's singles	1 August
Bronze	Matt Flapper; Nathan Rice; Wayne Ruediger; Brett Wilkie	Lawn bowls	Men's fours	1 August
Bronze	Hamish Peacock	Athletics	Men's javelin throw	2 August
Bronze	Kasey Brown; Cameron Pilley	Squash	Mixed doubles	3 August

Medals by sport
Sport	1st place, gold medalist(s)	2nd place, silver medalist(s)	3rd place, bronze medalist(s)	Total
Swimming	19	21	17	57
Athletics	8	1	3	12
Cycling	7	9	8	24
Shooting	6	0	2	8
Diving	2	3	3	8
Boxing	2	1	0	3
Squash	2	0	1	3
Hockey	2	0	0	2
Netball	1	0	0	1
Gymnastics	0	4	0	4
Lawn bowls	0	1	3	4
Weightlifting	0	1	2	3
Table tennis	0	1	1	2
Judo	0	0	4	4
Rugby sevens	0	0	1	1
Triathlon	0	0	1	1
Total	49	42	46	137

Medals by day
Day	1st place, gold medalist(s)	2nd place, silver medalist(s)	3rd place, bronze medalist(s)	Total
24 July	5	3	7	15
25 July	6	6	5	17
26 July	7	5	7	19
27 July	8	7	7	22
28 July	4	4	6	14
29 July	4	6	4	14
30 July	1	1	3	5
31 July	1	4	2	7
1 August	4	4	3	11
2 August	5	2	1	8
3 August	4	0	1	5
Total	49	42	46	137

Medals by gender
Day	1st place, gold medalist(s)	2nd place, silver medalist(s)	3rd place, bronze medalist(s)	Total
Men	22.5	23	21.5	67
Women	26.5	19	24.5	70
Total	49	42	46	137

* – Indicates the athlete competed in preliminaries but not the final

== Athletics ==
Athletics Australia announced 103 athletes on 5 June 2014. Tristan Thomas (400m hurdles) was originally selected but withdrew due to injury. On 21 June, Brooke Stratton (long jump) revealed that she would not be able to compete due to injury. On 26 July 2014, Alex Rowe withdrew from 800m due to a hamstring injury.

Men
Track & road events

Athlete	Event	Heat		Semifinal		Final	
Athlete	Event	Result	Rank	Result	Rank	Result	Rank
Sean Roberts	100 m (T37)	12.99	3 q	—N/a		13.10	6
Jarrod Geddes	200 m	21.03	3	did not advance			
Steven Solomon	400 m	46.26	2 q	DNF		did not advance	
Josh Ralph	800 m	1:52.48	5	did not advance			
Jeff Riseley	800 m	1:48.63	1 Q	1:47.82	5	did not advance	
Ryan Gregson	1500 m	3:41.91	7	—N/a		did not advance	
Jeff Riseley	1500 m	3:40.79	2 Q	—N/a		3:40.24	5
Richard Colman	1500 m (T54)	3:30.09	3 Q	—N/a		3:24.37	4
Kurt Fearnley	1500 m (T54)	3:19.65	1 Q	—N/a		3:23.08	2nd place, silver medalist(s)
Richard Nicholson	1500 m (T54)	3:30.12	4 q	—N/a		3:32.11	7
Collis Birmingham	5000 m	—N/a				13:35.44	12
Ben St Lawrence	10000 m	—N/a				28:49.41	16
Harry Summers	10000 m	—N/a				29:00.56	18
Sam Baines	110 m hurdles	14.03	5	—N/a		did not advance	
Nicholas Hough	110 m hurdles	13.70	3 q	—N/a		13.57	4
Ian Dewhurst	400 m hurdles	50.45	12	did not advance			
James Nipperess	3000 m steeplechase	—N/a				9:16.76	9
Jarrod Geddes; Jake Hammond; Nicholas Hough; Tim Leathart	4 × 100 m relay	DQ		—N/a		did not advance	
Alexander Beck; Craig Burns; Ian Dewhurst*; Jarrod Geddes; John Steffensen	4 × 400 m relay	3:05.41	2 Q	—N/a		3:04.19	6
Liam Adams	Marathon	—N/a				2:13.49	7
Martin Dent	Marathon	—N/a				2:19.22	19
Michael Shelley	Marathon	—N/a				2:11:15	1st place, gold medalist(s)

Field events

Athlete	Event	Qualification		Final	
Athlete	Event	Distance	Rank	Distance	Rank
Robert Crowther	Long jump	7.72	5 q	7.96	6
Henry Frayne	Long jump	7.85	4 q	NM	
Fabrice Lapierre	Long jump	7.95	2 Q	8.00	4
Nik Bojic	High jump	2.20	=1 q	2.21	12
Brandon Starc	High jump	2.20	=1 q	2.21	8
Matthew Boyd	Pole vault	—N/a		NM	
Joel Pocklington	Pole vault	—N/a		5.20	7
Damien Birkinhead	Shot put	19.20	6 q	19.59	5
Benn Harradine	Discus throw	61.06	3 q	61.91	4
Julian Wruck	Discus throw	59.02	4 q	58.37	9
Don Elgin	Discus throw (F42/44)	—N/a		37.72	8
Paul Raison	Discus throw (F42/44)	—N/a		44.44	7
Luke Cann	Javelin throw	79.36	2 Q	75.93	7
Hamish Peacock	Javelin throw	79.08	2 Q	81.75	3rd place, bronze medalist(s)
Joshua Robinson	Javelin throw	78.32	4 Q	79.95	4
Timothy Driesen	Hammer throw	69.63	3 q	69.94	5
Huw Peacock	Hammer throw	63.95	7	did not advance	

Combined events – Decathlon

Athlete	Event	100 m	LJ	SP	HJ	400 m	110H	DT	PV	JT	1500 m	Final	Rank
Stephen Cain	Result	11.33	6.73	13.87	1.99	51.07	14.85	44.87	4.90	62.68	4:40.29	7787	5
Stephen Cain	Points	789	750	720	794	766	868	764	880	778	678	7787	5
Jake Stein	Result	DQ	7.15	14.80	1.96	50.63	15.09	50.37	4.10	68.25	4:53.12	7005	14
Jake Stein	Points	0	850	777	767	786	839	878	745	763	600	7005	14

Women
Track & road events

Athlete	Event	Heat		Semifinal		Final	
Athlete	Event	Result	Rank	Result	Rank	Result	Rank
Melissa Breen	100 m	11.54	1 q	11.45	5	did not advance	
Ella Nelson	200 m	23.57	3 Q	23.50	6	did not advance	
Ashleigh Whittaker	200 m	24.47	4 q	24.49	7	did not advance	
Morgan Mitchell	400 m	54.28	3 q	53.37	6	did not advance	
Anneliese Rubie	400 m	52.86	4 q	52.55	4	did not advance	
Katherine Katsanevakis	800 m	2:05.41	4	did not advance			
Brittany McGowan	800 m	2:03.08	3 Q	2:08.79	8	did not advance	
Zoe Buckman	1500 m	4:11.56	6	—N/a		did not advance	
Melissa Duncan	1500 m	4:05.76	5 q	—N/a		4:14.10	10
Kaila McKnight	1500 m	4:06.06	6 q	—N/a		4:12.77	8
Angela Ballard	1500 m (T54)	4:01.69	2 Q	—N/a		3:59.20	1st place, gold medalist(s)
Christie Dawes	1500 m (T54)	3:53.07	2 Q	—N/a		4:03.43	4
Emily Brichacek	5000 m	—N/a				15:39.96	7
Eloise Wellings	5000 m	—N/a				15:14.99	5
Michelle Jenneke	100 m hurdles	13.33	4 q	—N/a		13.36	5
Shannon McCann	100 m hurdles	13.34	2 Q	—N/a		13.60	8
Sally Pearson	100 m hurdles	12.69	1 Q	—N/a		12.67	1st place, gold medalist(s)
Lyndsay Pekin	400 m hurdles	57.92	4	—N/a		did not advance	
Lauren Wells	400 m hurdles	55.72	2 Q	—N/a		56.09	4
Madeline Heiner	3000 m steeplechase	—N/a				9:34.01	4
Genevieve LaCaze	3000 m steeplechase	—N/a				9:37.04	5
Victoria Mitchell	3000 m steeplechase	—N/a				9:49.05	9
Melissa Breen; Michelle Cutmore*; Margaret Gayen; Ella Nelson; Ashleigh Whittaker	4 × 100 m relay	44.45	2 Q	—N/a		44.21	5
Jess Gulli*; Morgan Mitchell; Lyndsay Pekin*; Anneleise Rubie; Caitlin Sargent; Lauren Wells	4 × 400 m relay	3:32.40	2 Q	—N/a		3:30.27	4
Sarah Klein	Marathon	—N/a				2:35.21	10
Melanie Panayiotou	Marathon	—N/a				2:35.01	8
Jessica Trengove	Marathon	—N/a				2:30.12	3rd place, bronze medalist(s)

Field events

Athlete	Event	Qualification		Final	
Athlete	Event	Distance	Position	Distance	Position
Margaret Gayen	Long jump	6.34	3 q	6.34	6
Jessica Penney	Long jump	6.14	10	did not advance	
Rae Anderson	Long jump (T37/38)	—N/a		3.67	7
Jodi Elkington	Long jump (T37/38)	—N/a		4.31	1st place, gold medalist(s)
Ella Pardy	Long jump (T37/38)	—N/a		3.62	9
Linda Leverton	Triple jump	13.48	4 q	13.69	5
Ellen Pettitt	Triple jump	13.34	6 q	13.54	6
Hannah Joye	High jump	1.85	4 q	1.89	6
Eleanor Patterson	High jump	1.85	=1 q	1.94	1st place, gold medalist(s)
Zoe Timmers	High jump	1.85	3 q	1.78	=10
Alana Boyd	Pole vault	—N/a		4.50	1st place, gold medalist(s)
Liz Parnov	Pole vault	—N/a		NM	
Vicky Parnov	Pole vault	—N/a		NM	
Kim Mulhall	Shot put	—N/a		14.55	11
Christie Chamberlain	Discus throw	52.64	10 q	52.61	10
Taryn Gollshewsky	Discus throw	58.24	3 Q	53.04	9
Dani Samuels	Discus throw	64.53	1 Q	64.88	1st place, gold medalist(s)
Kelsey-Lee Roberts	Javelin throw	—N/a		62.95	3rd place, bronze medalist(s)
Kim Mickle	Javelin throw	—N/a		65.96 GR	1st place, gold medalist(s)
Kathryn Mitchell	Javelin throw	—N/a		62.59	4
Gabrielle Neighbour	Hammer throw	61.23	7 Q	61.84	8
Lara Neilsen	Hammer throw	59.28	10 Q	60.18	9

Combined events – Heptathlon

Athlete	Event	100H	HJ	SP	200 m	LJ	JT	800 m	Final	Rank
Sophie Stanwell	Result	14.18	1.69	11.96	24.35	5.99	36.77	2:14.28	4851	4
Sophie Stanwell	Points	953	842	658	947	846	605	903	4851	4

– Katherine Katsanevakis replaced Kelly Hetherington who withdrew due to injury.

Officials:

- Simon Nathan (head of delegation)
- Eric Hollingsworth (head coach)
- Nathan Sims (section manager)
- Sharon Hannan (assistant section managers)
- Andrew Faichney (assistant section managers)

== Badminton ==
Badminton Australia announced a team of 10 athletes on 5 June 2014.

Singles & doubles

Athlete	Event	Round of 64	Round of 32	Round of 16	Quarterfinal	Semifinal	Final / BM	
Athlete	Event	Opposition Score	Opposition Score	Opposition Score	Opposition Score	Opposition Score	Opposition Score	Rank
Jeff Tho	Men's singles	Githitu (KEN); W 2 – 0	Malcouzanne (SEY); W 2 – 0	Kashyap (IND); L 0 – 2	did not advance			
Robin Middleton; Ross Smith	Men's doubles	Bye	Padmore / Thorpe (BAR); W 2 – 0	Campbell / MacHugh (SCO); W 2 – 0	Goh / Tan (MAS); L 0 – 2	did not advance		
Raymond Tam; Glenn Warfe	Men's doubles	Bye	Haque / Jaman (BAN); W 2 – 0	Cupidon / Malcouzanne (SEY); W 2 – 0	Landridge / Mills (ENG); L 0 – 2	did not advance		
Verdet Kessler	Women's singles	Eastmond (BAR); W 2 – 0	Gilmour (SCO); L 0 – 2	did not advance				
Jacqueline Guan; Gronya Somerville	Women's doubles	—N/a	Thomas / Turner (WAL); L 1 – 2	did not advance				
Tang; Veeran	Women's doubles	—N/a	Gray / Snell (NFI); W 2 – 0	Gutta / Ponnappa (IND); L 1 – 2	did not advance			
Jacqueline Guan; Jeff Tho	Mixed doubles	Rasheed / Rasheed (MDV); W 2 – 0	Minto / Stewart (FAI); W 2 – 0	Landridge / Olver (ENG); L 0 – 2	did not advance			
Ross Smith; Renuga Veeran	Mixed doubles	Bye	Triyachart / Yao (SIN); L 1 – 2	did not advance				

Officials: Head Coach – Lasse Bundgaard, Coach – Ricky Yu, Section Manager -Rhonda Cator

Mixed team

Pool D

Pos	Team	Pld	W	L	GF	GA	GD	PF	PA	PD	Pts	Qualification
1	Canada	3	3	0	25	6	+19	626	386	+240	3	Quarterfinals
2	Australia	3	2	1	23	8	+15	596	412	+184	2	Quarterfinals
3	Wales	3	1	2	14	18	−4	556	494	+62	1	
4	Falkland Islands	3	0	3	0	30	−30	144	630	−486	0	

Source: glasgow2014.com

Australia
4
Commonwealth Arena, Glasgow
24 July

Wales
1

			1	2	3
1	(Australia) (Wales)	Ross Smith / Renuga Veeran; Sarah Thomas / Oliver Gwilt	21; 15	21; 12
2	(Australia) (Wales)	Jeff Tho; Daniel Font	16; 21	21; 13	13; 21
3	(Australia) (Wales)	Verdet Kessler; Carissa Turner	22; 20	21; 13
4	(Australia) (Wales)	Ross Smith / Robin Middleton; Joe Morgan / Nicolas Strange	21; 12	21; 14
5	(Australia) (Wales)	Renuga Veeran / He Tian Tang; Sarah Thomas / Carissa Turner	21; 16	21; 13

Australia
5
Commonwealth Arena, Glasgow
25 July

Falkland Islands
0

			1	2	3
1	(Australia) (Falkland Islands)	Raymond Tam / Gronya Somerville; Douglas Clark / Anna Luxton	21; 7	21; 7
2	(Australia) (Falkland Islands)	Jeff Tho; Dominic Jaffray	21; 6	21; 2
3	(Australia) (Falkland Islands)	Verdet Kessler; Laura Minto	21; 4	21; 3
4	(Australia) (Falkland Islands)	Raymond Tam / Glenn Warfe; Douglas Clark / Ross Stewart	21; 8	21; 10
5	(Australia) (Falkland Islands)	Gronya Somerville / Jacqueline Guan; Laura Minto / Louise Williams	21; 4	21; 4

Australia
2
Commonwealth Arena, Glasgow
25 July

Canada
3

			1	2	3
1	(Australia) (Canada)	Ross Smith / Renuga Veeran; Toby Ng / Alex Bruce	21; 11	21; 17
2	(Australia) (Canada)	Jeff Tho; Andrew D'Souza	10; 21	8; 21
3	(Australia) (Canada)	Verdet Kessler; Michelle Li	16; 21	13; 21
4	(Australia) (Canada)	Ross Smith / Robin Middleton; Adrian Liu / Derrick Ng	21; 11	21; 17
5	(Australia) (Canada)	Renuga Veeran / He Tian Tang; Michelle Li / Rachel Honderich	24; 26	12; 21

Quarterfinals

Singapore
3
Commonwealth Arena, Glasgow
26 July

Australia
0

			1	2	3
1	(Singapore) (Australia)	Danny Bawa Chrisnanta / Vanessa Neo; Ross Smith / Renuga Veeran	21; 15	21; 14
2	(Singapore) (Australia)	Derek Wong; Jeff Tho	21; 7	21; 13
3	(Singapore) (Australia)	Chayut Triyachart / Danny Bawa Chrisnanta; Ross Smith / Robin Middleton	21; 17	21; 19
4	(Singapore) (Australia)	Liang Xiaoyu; Verdet Kessler				not played
5	(Singapore) (Australia)	Shinta Mulia Sari / Yao Lei; Renuga Veeran / Tang Hetian				not played

== Boxing ==
Boxing Australia announced a team of 11 boxers on 28 May 2014.

Men

Athlete	Event	Round of 32	Round of 16	Quarterfinals	Semifinals	Final	
Athlete	Event	Opposition Result	Opposition Result	Opposition Result	Opposition Result	Opposition Result	Rank
Andrew Moloney	Flyweight	Bye	Taiwo (NGR); W 3 – 0	Dalton (NIR); W 3 – 0	Mcfadden (SCO); W 2 – 1	Waseem (PAK); W 3 – 0	1st place, gold medalist(s)
Jackson Woods	Bantamweight	Bye	McGoldrick (WAL); L 1 – 2	did not advance			
Nick Cooney	Lightweight	Othman (MAS); W 3 – 0	Flynn (SCO); L 0 – 3	did not advance			
Daniel Lewis	Welterweight	Sillah (SLE); W KO	Ademuyiwa (NGR); W 3 – 0	Jangra (IND)	did not advance		
Mark Lucas	Middleweight	Nawarathna (SRI); W 3 – 0	Abaka (KEN); L 0 – 3	did not advance			
Jordan Samardali	Light heavyweight	Charles (LCA); W 2 – 0	Fata Kelepi (SAM); W 2 – 1	St Pierre (MRI); L TKO	did not advance		
Jai Opetaia	Heavyweight	—N/a	Hala (SAM); W 3 – 0	Apochi (NGR); L 0 – 3	did not advance		
Joseph Goodall	Super heavyweight	—N/a	Mailata (NZL); W 3 – 0	Major (BAH); W 3 – 0	Ajagba (NGR); W 3 – 0	Joyce (ENG); L 0 – 3	2nd place, silver medalist(s)

Women

Athlete	Event	Round of 16	Quarterfinals	Semifinals	Final	
Athlete	Event	Opposition Result	Opposition Result	Opposition Result	Opposition Result	Rank
Kristy Harris	Flyweight	Ongare (KEN); W 3 – 0	Bujold (CAN); L 3 – 0	did not advance		
Shelley Watts	Lightweight	Jonas (ENG); W 2 – 1	Ratna (MRI); W TKO	Audley-Murphy (NIR); L 3 – 0	Devi (IND); W 3 – 0	1st place, gold medalist(s)
Kaye Scott	Middleweight	Andiego (KEN); W 3 – 0	Price (WAL); L 0 – 3	did not advance		

Officials: Head Coach – Kevin Smith, Assistant coach – Don Abnett, Section Manager – Allan Nicholson

== Cycling ==
Cycling Australia announced a team of 41 athletes on 10gicke 2014.

=== Road ===
Men

Athlete	Event	Time	Rank
Simon Clarke	Road race	DNF	
Rohan Dennis	Road race	DNF	
Caleb Ewan	Road race	4:24:27	12
Nathan Haas	Road race	DNF	
Michael Hepburn	Road race	DNF	
Mark Renshaw	Road race	4:17:34	5
Rohan Dennis	Time trial	47:51.08	2nd place, silver medalist(s)
Luke Durbridge	Time trial	45:57.73	9
Michael Hepburn	Time trial	49:10.83	6

Women

Athlete	Event	Time	Rank
Tiffany Cromwell	Road race	2:39:54	4
Gracie Elvin	Road race	2:41:02	6
Katrin Garfoot	Road race	DNF	
Shara Gillow	Road race	2:44:12	17
Chloe Hosking	Road race	2:51:00	26
Melissa Hoskins	Road race	2:44:12	10
Katrin Garfoot	Time trial	43:13.91	3rd place, bronze medalist(s)
Shara Gillow	Time trial	43:33.70	6

=== Track ===
Sprint

Athlete	Event	Qualification		Round 1	Repechage	Quarterfinals	Semifinals	Final	
Athlete	Event	Time	Rank	Opposition Time	Opposition Time	Opposition Time	Opposition Time	Opposition Time	Rank
Matthew Glaetzer	Men's sprint	9.779 GR	1 Q	Crampton (ENG); 10.252 W	Bye	Kenny (ENG); L, L	Did not advance	5th – 8th classification 10.507 W	5
Peter Lewis	Men's sprint	9.975	4 Q	Phillip (TRI); 10.363 W	Bye	Archibald (NZL); 10.664 W, 10.314 W	Kenny (ENG); 10.544 W, L, L	Bronze medal final Dawkins (NZL); L, L	4
Matthew Glaetzer; Nathan Hart; Shane Perkins	Men's team sprint	44.027	3 Q	—N/a				Canada; 43.709 W	3rd place, bronze medalist(s)
Thomas Clarke; Paul Kennedy	Men's tandem sprint B	10.593	4 Q	—N/a			Modra/ Niblett (AUS); L, L	Bronze medal final Ellis/ Williams (WAL); 10.891 W, 11.185 W	3rd place, bronze medalist(s)
Kieran Modra; Jason Niblett	Men's tandem sprint B	10.050 GR	1 Q	—N/a			Clarke/ Kennedy (AUS); 11.381 W, 11.816 W	Fachie/ Maclean (SCO); 11.167 W, L, L	2nd place, silver medalist(s)
Anna Meares	Women's sprint	11.171	2 Q	—N/a		Davis (SCO); 12.719 W, 12.032 W	Varnish (ENG); 12.004 W, 11.675 W	Morton (AUS); 11.734 L, 11.422 L	2nd place, silver medalist(s)
Stephanie Morton	Women's sprint	10.984 GR	1 Q	—N/a		Khan (ENG); 11.639 W, 11.596 W	Mustapa (MAS); 11.920 W, 11.898 W	Meares (AUS); 11.734 W, 11.422 W	1st place, gold medalist(s)
Breanna Hargrave; Brandie O'Connor	Women's tandem sprint B	11.623	3 Q	—N/a			Scott; Thornhill (ENG); L, L	Johnson; Takos (AUS); 12.596 W, 12.409 W	3rd place, bronze medalist(s)
Felicity Johnson; Holly Takos	Women's tandem sprint B	11.695	4 Q	—N/a			Haston; Mcglynn (SCO); L, L	Hargrave; O'Connor (AUS); L, L	4

Pursuit

Athlete	Event	Qualification		Final	
Athlete	Event	Time	Rank	Opponent Results	Rank
Jack Bobridge	Men's pursuit	4:19.211	1 Q	Edmondson (AUS); 4:19.650 W	1st place, gold medalist(s)
Alex Edmondson	Men's pursuit	4:20.853	2 Q	Bobridge (AUS); 4:24.620 L	2nd place, silver medalist(s)
Miles Scotson	Men's pursuit	4.24.819	6	did not advance	
Jack Bobridge; Luke Davison; Alex Edmondson; Glenn O'Shea	Men's team pursuit	3:57.939	1 Q	England; 3:54.851 W GR	1st place, gold medalist(s)
Amy Cure	Women's pursuit	3:31.543	3 Q	Archibald (SCO); 3:35.384 W	3rd place, bronze medalist(s)
Annette Edmondson	Women's pursuit	3:30.728	2 Q	Rowsell (ENG); 3:35.450 L	2nd place, silver medalist(s)

Time trial

Athlete	Event	Time	Rank
Scott Sunderland	Men's time trial	1:00.675 GR	1st place, gold medalist(s)
Thomas Clarke; Paul Kennedy	Men's tandem time trial B	1:05.261	4
Kieran Modra; Jason Niblett	Men's tandem time trial B	1:02.244	2nd place, silver medalist(s)
Anna Meares	Women's time trial	33.435 GR	1st place, gold medalist(s)
Stephanie Morton	Women's time trial	34.079	2nd place, silver medalist(s)
Breanna Hargrave; Brandie O'Connor	Women's tandem time trial B	1:10.543	3rd place, bronze medalist(s)
Felicity Johnson; Holly Takos	Women's tandem time trial B	1:11.826	4

Points race

Athlete	Event	Qualification		Final	
Athlete	Event	Points	Rank	Points	Rank
Jack Bobridge	Men's point race	28	=2 Q	42	6
Glenn O'Shea	Men's point race	3	=9 Q	30	7
Miles Scotson	Men's point race	7	7 Q	DNF	
Amy Cure	Women's points race	—N/a		32	4
Annette Edmondson	Women's points race	—N/a		10	9
Melissa Hoskins	Women's points race	—N/a		4	11

Scratch race

Athlete	Event	Qualification	Final
Luke Davison	Men's scratch race	3 Q	DNF
Alex Edmondson	Men's scratch race	5 Q	DNF
Glenn O'Shea	Men's scratch race	4 Q	2nd place, silver medalist(s)
Amy Cure	Women's scratch race	—N/a	2nd place, silver medalist(s)
Annette Edmondson	Women's scratch race	—N/a	1st place, gold medalist(s)
Melissa Hoskins	Women's scratch race	—N/a	15

Keirin

Athlete	Event	Round 1	Repechage	Semifinals	Final
Matthew Glaetzer	Men's keirin	1 Q	Bye	3 Q	1st place, gold medalist(s)
Peter Lewis	Men's keirin	1 Q	Bye	2 Q	5
Shane Perkins	Men's keirin	4 R	1 Q	3 Q	4

=== Mountain Bike ===
Athlete	Event	Time	Rank
Andrew Blair	Men's cross-country	1:48:16	12
Cameron Ivory	Men's cross-country	1:43:20	8
Daniel McConnell	Men's cross-country	1:38:36	3rd place, bronze medalist(s)
Rebecca Henderson	Women's cross-country	1:40:51	3rd place, bronze medalist(s)
Peta Mullens	Women's cross-country	1:49:06	12
Tory Thomas	Women's cross-country	1:52:32	13

== Diving ==
Diving Australia announced a team of 12 athletes on 12 April 2014.

Men

Athlete	Event	Preliminaries		Final	
Athlete	Event	Points	Rank	Points	Rank
Matthew Mitcham	1 m springboard	383.65	2 Q	404.85	2nd place, silver medalist(s)
Grant Nel	1 m springboard	352.60	5 Q	403.40	3rd place, bronze medalist(s)
Grant Nel	3 m springboard	335.25	15	did not advance	
Domonic Bedggood	10 m platform	390.25	8 Q	397.55	7
Matthew Mitcham	10 m platform	450.80	2 Q	420.00	4
Matthew Mitcham; Grant Nel	3 m synchronised springboard	—N/a		403.14	2nd place, silver medalist(s)
Domonic Bedggood; Matthew Mitcham	10 m synchronised platform	—N/a		399.54	1st place, gold medalist(s)

Women

Athlete	Event	Preliminaries		Final	
Athlete	Event	Points	Rank	Points	Rank
Maddison Keeney	1 m springboard	275.20	3 Q	281.959	2nd place, silver medalist(s)
Esther Qin	1 m springboard	283.50	1 Q	278.65	3rd place, bronze medalist(s)
Georgina Sheehan	1 m springboard	248.75	10 Q	278.60	4
Maddison Keeney	3 m springboard	336.75	2 Q	308.20	=4
Esther Qin	3 m springboard	324.60	3 Q	347.25	1st place, gold medalist(s)
Annabelle Smith	3 m springboard	290.25	8 Q	298.95	8
Rachel Bugg	10 m platform	281.95	10 Q	247.90	12
Lara Tarvit	10 m platform	301.60	7 Q	341.60	4
Melissa Wu	10 m platform	302.30	6 Q	259.20	11
Anna Gelai; Esther Qin	3 m synchronised springboard	—N/a		290.10	4
Maddison Keeney; Annabelle Smith	3 m synchronised springboard	—N/a		294.72	3rd place, bronze medalist(s)
Rachel Bugg; Melissa Wu	10 m synchronised platform	—N/a		292.50	5

== Gymnastics ==
Gymnastics Australia announced a team of 10 artistic gymnasts on 25 May 2014 and 3 rhythmic gymnasts on 1 June.

=== Artistic ===
Men
Team

Athlete	Event	Apparatus						Total	Rank
Athlete	Event	Floor	Pommel horse	Rings	Vault	Parallel bars	Horizontal bar	Total	Rank
Sean O'Hara	Team	13.866	12.066	13.366	13.633	12.600	13.766 Q	79.297	10 Q
Kent Pieterse	Team	13.933	—N/a	—N/a	13.966 Q	—N/a	13.766	—N/a	
Jack Rickards	Team	—N/a	11.300	13.633	—N/a	13.033	—N/a	—N/a	
Naoya Tsukahara	Team	13.866	13.266	14.308 Q	12.866	14.691 Q	13.900 Q	82.897	6 Q
Luke Wadsworth	Team	13.366	12.633	13.933	14.316	14.366 Q	13.433	82.047	7 Q
Total	Team	41.665	37.965	41.874	41.915	42.090	41.432	246.941	4

Individual

Athlete	Event	Apparatus						Total	Rank
Athlete	Event	Floor	Pommel horse	Rings	Vault	Parallel bars	Horizontal bar	Total	Rank
Sean O'Hara	All-around	13.666	11.833	13.000	13.833	14.133	12.966	79.431	11
Naoya Tsukahara	All-around	13.933	12.833	14.733	14.466	14.141	13.633	83.739	5
Luke Wadsworth	All-around	13.900	12.233	13.733	14.300	13.800	13.666	81.632	9
Naoya Tsukahara	Rings	—N/a		14.700	—N/a			14.700	4
Kent Pieterse	Vault	—N/a			14.099	—N/a		14.099	4
Naoya Tsukahara	Parallel bars	—N/a				14.133	—N/a	14.133	5
Luke Wadsworth	Parallel bars	—N/a				12.400	—N/a	12.400	7
Sean O'Hara	Horizontal bar	—N/a					12.700	12.700	7
Naoya Tsukahara	Horizontal bar	—N/a					14.066	14.066	5

Women
Team

Athlete	Event	Apparatus				Total	Rank
Athlete	Event	Floor	Vault	Uneven bars	Balance beam	Total	Rank
Georgia-Rose Brown	Team	11.066	14.133 Q	14.083 Q	11.200	50.482	14 Q
Larrissa Miller	Team	12.166	—N/a	14.433 Q	—N/a	—N/a	
Lauren Mitchell	Team	14.100 Q	13.433	—N/a	13.966 Q	—N/a	
Mary-Anne Monckton	Team	—N/a	14.000	13.333	13.100 Q	—N/a	
Olivia Vivian	Team	13.166	12.533	13.800	11.266	50.765	11 Q
Total	Team	39.432	41.533	42.316	38.332	161.343	2nd place, silver medalist(s)

Individual

Athlete	Event	Apparatus				Total	Rank
Athlete	Event	Floor	Vault	Uneven bars	Balance beam	Total	Rank
Georgia-Rose Brown	All-around	12.533	14.133	13.066	10.866	50.598	13
Olivia Vivian	All-around	13.366	12.466	13.800	13.000	52.632	5
Lauren Mitchell	Floor	13.833	—N/a			13.833	2nd place, silver medalist(s)
Georgia-Rose Brown	Vault	—N/a	13.833	—N/a		13.833	7
Georgia-Rose Brown	Uneven bars	—N/a		13.566	—N/a	13.566	5
Larrissa Miller	Uneven bars	—N/a		14.566	—N/a	14.566	2nd place, silver medalist(s)
Lauren Mitchell	Balance beam	—N/a			13.000	13.000	6
Mary-Anne Monckton	Balance beam	—N/a			13.666	13.666	2nd place, silver medalist(s)

=== Rhythmic ===
Team

Athlete	Event	Apparatus				Total	Rank
Athlete	Event	Hoop	Ball	Clubs	Ribbon	Total	Rank
Jaelle Cohen	Team	12.075	12.250	12.150	12.200	48.675	15 Q
Danielle Prince	Team	13.600	13.425	13.700	13.000	53.725	10 Q
Amy Quinn	Team	11.050	12.725	10.600	11.600	—N/a	
Total	Team	36.725	38.400	36.450	36.800	126.725	5

Individual

Athlete	Event	Apparatus				Total	Rank
Athlete	Event	Hoop	Ball	Clubs	Ribbon	Total	Rank
Jaelle Cohen	All-around	12.050	11.600	11.850	11.550	47.050	14
Danielle Prince	All-around	12.500	12.900	13.325	13.000	51.725	9

== Hockey ==
Hockey Australia announced a team of 32 players on 24 June 2014.

=== Men ===
- Daniel Beale
- Kiel Brown
- Andrew Charter
- Chris Ciriello
- Matt Gohdes
- Kieran Govers
- Fergus Kavanagh
- Mark Knowles
- Trent Mitton
- Eddie Ockenden
- Simon Orchard
- Andrew Philpott
- Matthew Swann
- Jake Whetton
- Tristan White
- Aran Zalewski
- Head coaches Graham Reid and Paul Gaudoin
- Assistant coach Ben Bishop

Pool A

Pos	Team	Pld	W	D	L	GF	GA	GD	Pts	Qualification
1	Australia	4	4	0	0	22	3	+19	12	Semi-finals
2	India	4	3	0	1	16	9	+7	9	Semi-finals
3	South Africa	4	2	0	2	9	12	−3	6	
4	Scotland	4	1	0	3	6	16	−10	3	
5	Wales	4	0	0	4	6	19	−13	0	

Source: FIH
Rules for classification: 1) points; 2) goal difference; 3) goals scored; 4) head-to-head result.

26 July 2014
14:00

Australia	7–1	Wales
Ciriello 6'; Govers 7'; Whetton 29', 44', 46'; Gohdes 66', 69'	Report	Kyriakides 50'

Umpires:
Martin Madden (SCO)
Gavin Caldecott (CAN)

28 July 2014
09:00

South Africa	0–6	Australia
	Report	Mitton 8', 24'; Ciriello 27'; Orchard 46'; Govers 48', 64'

Umpires:
Dan Barstow (ENG)
Gareth Greenfield (NZL)

29 July 2014
14:00

India	2–4	Australia
R. Singh 35'; Ra. Singh 49'	Report	C. Ciriello 15', 50'; Orchard 17'; Whetton 27'

Umpires:
Martin Madden (SCO)
Dan Barstow (ENG)

31 July 2014
14:00

Australia	5–0	Scotland
Ciriello 19'; Gohdes 23', 25'; Govers 38'; Whetton 43'	Report

Umpires:
Lim Hong Zhen (SIN)
Will Drury (WAL)

Semifinal

2 August 2014
10:00

Australia	4–1	England
White 3'; Orchard 12'; Ciriello 62'; Ockenden 69'	Report	Martin 52'

Umpires:
Martin Madden (SCO)
Peter Wright (RSA)

Gold medal match

3 August 2014
12:15

(gold) Australia	4–0	India (silver)
Ciriello 13', 29', 47'; Ockenden 51'	Report

Umpires:
Dan Barstow (ENG)
Martin Madden (SCO)

=== Women ===
- Madonna Blyth
- Edwina Bone
- Jane Claxton
- Casey Eastham
- Anna Flanagan
- Kate Jenner
- Jodie Kenny
- Rachael Lynch
- Karri McMahon
- Georgia Nanscawen
- Ashleigh Nelson
- Georgie Parker
- Brooke Peris
- Emily Smith
- Jayde Taylor
- Kellie White
- Head coach Adam Commens
- Assistant coaches Jason Duff and Mark Hickman

Pool B

Team	Pld	W	D	L	GF	GA	GD	Pts	Qualification
Australia	4	4	0	0	25	0	+25	12	Semi-finals
England	4	3	0	1	9	4	+5	9	Semi-finals
Scotland	4	2	0	2	5	11	−6	6	
Malaysia	4	0	1	3	0	11	−11	1	
Wales	4	0	1	3	0	13	−13	1	

24 July 2014
09:00

Australia	4–0	Malaysia
Kenny 7'; White 20'; Parker 30', 49'	Report

Umpires:
Sarah Wilson (SCO)
Wendy Stewart (CAN)

25 July 2014
14:00

Australia	9–0	Wales
Kenny 12', 22', 26'; Parker 14', 45', 50'; Smith 25'; Peris 40'; Nanscawen 53'	Report

Umpires:
Annelize Rostron (RSA)
Nur Hafizah Azman (MAS)

27 July 2014
09:00

Scotland	0–9	Australia
	Report	Kenny 3', 20', 47'; Nelson 19'; Flanagan 53', 60'; Nanscawen 55'; Smith 63'; Taylor 67'

Umpires:
Dino Willox (WAL)
Ayana McClean (TRI)

28 July 2014
14:00

Australia	3–0	England
Kenny 12', 50'; Smith 13'	Report

Umpires:
Aleesha Unka (NZL)
Sarah Wilson (SCO)

Semifinal

1 August 2014
12:15

Australia	7–1	South Africa
Smith 17'; White 21', 47'; Parker 49', 57'; Claxton 50'; Nanscawen 67'	Report	Evans 53'

Umpires:
Aleesha Unka (NZL)
Sarah Wilson (SCO)

Gold medal match

2 August 2014
20:15

(gold) Australia	1–1	England (silver)
Kenny 70'	Report	Owsley 48'
Penalties
Eastham (penalty shoot-out scored); White (penalty shoot-out missed); Parker (penalty shoot-out scored); Kenny (penalty shoot-out missed); Blyth (penalty shoot-out scored)	3–1	(penalty shoot-out scored) Twigg; (penalty shoot-out missed) Danson; (penalty shoot-out missed) Gilbert; (penalty shoot-out missed) White

Umpires:
Dino Willox (WAL)
Wendy Stewart (CAN)

== Judo ==
Judo Federation of Australia announced a team of 13 athletes on 30 May 2014.

Men

Athlete	Event	Round of 32	Round of 16	Quarterfinals	Semifinals	Repechage	Final/BM	
Athlete	Event	Opposition Result	Opposition Result	Opposition Result	Opposition Result	Opposition Result	Opposition Result	Rank
Tom Pappas	-60 kg	—N/a	Chana (IND); L 000–002	did not advance				
Steven Brown	-66 kg	Bye	Krassas (CYP); L 000–110	did not advance				
Jake Bensted	-73 kg	Bye	Repiyallage (SRI); W' 100–000	Ganzo (KEN); W 100–000	Williams (ENG); L 000–000	Bye	Dawson (SCO); W 100–000	3rd place, bronze medalist(s)
Arnie Dickins	-73 kg	Bye	Williams (ENG); L 001–010	did not advance				
Mark Anthony	-90 kg	—N/a	Bezzina (MLT); W 102–001	Hall (ENG); W 011–000	Purssey (SCO); L 000–010	Bye	Burns (SCO); L 0021–0010	4
Duke Didier	-100 kg	—N/a	Bye	Shah (PAK); L 000–100	Did not advance	Rancev (WAL); W 100–000	Koster (NZL); L0001–0003	4
Jake Andrewartha	+100 kg	—N/a	Bye	Shaw (WAL); W 100–010	Snyman (RSA); L 000–100	Bye	Kuman (IND); W 1001–0000	3rd place, bronze medalist(s)

Women

Athlete	Event	Round of 16	Quarterfinals	Semifinals	Repechage	Final/BM	
Athlete	Event	Opposition Result	Opposition Result	Opposition Result	Opposition Result	Opposition Result	Rank
Amy Meyer	-48 kg	Bye	Likmabam (IND); L 000–100	Did not advance	Chindele (ZAM); W 011–001	Okey (BAR); W 000–000	3rd place, bronze medalist(s)
Chloe Rayner	-48 kg	Bye	Chindele (ZAM); W 000–000	Likmabam (IND); L 000–102	Bye	Monabang (CMR); W 010–000	3rd place, bronze medalist(s)
Hannah Trotter	-52 kg	Bye	Thoudam (IND); L 000–002	Did not advance	Francis-Methot (CAN); L 010–010	did not advance	
Katharina Heacker	-63 kg	Bye	Yeats-Brown (ENG); W 101–000	Clark (SCO); L 000–100	Bye	Pitman (ENG); L 000–010	4
Catherine Arscott	-70 kg	Bye	Huidrom (IND); W 001–000	de Villiers (NZL); L 000–000	Bye	Renaud-Roy (CAN); L 000–100	4
Sara Collins	-70 kg	Bye	Conway (SCO); L 000–100	Did not advance	Renaud-Roy (CAN); L 000–100	did not advance	

== Lawn Bowls ==
Bowls Australia announced a team of 17 athletes.

Men

Athlete	Event	Preliminary round						Quarterfinals	Semifinals	Final/BM	Rank
Athlete	Event	Match 1	Match 2	Match 3	Match 4	Match 5	Rank	Quarterfinals	Semifinals	Final/BM	Rank
Athlete	Event	Opposition Result	Opposition Result	Opposition Result	Opposition Result	Opposition Result	Rank	Opposition Result	Opposition Result	Opposition Result	Rank
Aron Sherriff	Singles	Tagelagi (NIU); W 21 – 6	Njuguna (KEN); W 21 – 17	Tolchard (ENG); W 21 – 18	Weale (WAL); W 21 – 11	—N/a	1 Q	Rais (MAS); W 21 – 19	Burnett (SCO); L 15 – 21	McIlroy (NZL); W 21 – 8	3rd place, bronze medalist(s)
Aron Sherriff; Brett Wilkie	Pairs	Papatua / Pita (COK); W 25 – 11	Christian / Sheridan (NFI); W 14 – 10	de Sousa / Greechan (JER); W 20 – 7	Calitz / Esterhuizen (NAM); W 25 – 10	—N/a	1 Q	Calitz / Esterhuizen (NAM); L 12 – 19	did not advance		
Matt Flapper; Nathan Rice; Wayne Ruediger	Triples	Pakistan; W 19 – 12	Falkland Islands; W 23 – 5	Papua New Guinea; W 20 – 10	England; W 17 – 15	Malaysia; W 17 – 15	1 Q	Jersey; W 16 – 13	South Africa; L 14 – 18	Wales; L 13 – 16	4
Matt Flapper; Nathan Rice; Wayne Ruediger; Brett Wilkie	Fours	Papua New Guinea; W 20 – 8	Norfolk Island; W 20 – 10	Malaysia; W 16 – 10	New Zealand; W 16 – 9	—N/a	1 Q	Wales; W 19 – 14	Scotland; L 10 – 15	India; W 15 – 14	3rd place, bronze medalist(s)

Women

Athlete	Event	Preliminary round						Quarterfinals	Semifinals	Final/BM	Rank
Athlete	Event	Match 1	Match 2	Match 3	Match 4	Match 5	Rank	Quarterfinals	Semifinals	Final/BM	Rank
Athlete	Event	Opposition Result	Opposition Result	Opposition Result	Opposition Result	Opposition Result	Rank	Opposition Result	Opposition Result	Opposition Result	Rank
Kelsey Cottrell	Singles	McGreal (IOM); W 21 – 10	Like (ZAM); L 19 – 21	Beere (GUE); W 21 – 12	Taylor (WAL); L 11 – 21	Brown (SCO); W 21 – 11	3	did not advance			
Carla Odgers; Natasha Scott	Pairs	Peyroux / Rereiti (NIU); W 30 – 9	Wangon / Wimp (PNG); W 13 – 12	Cameron / Cunningham (NIR); W 23 – 15	Ahmad / Ismail (MAS); W 18 – 14	—N/a	1 Q	Greechan / Nixon (JER); L 11 – 16	did not advance		
Lynsey Clarke; Kelsey Cottrell; Karen Murphy	Triples	Niue; W 24 – 10	India; D 13 – 13	Jersey; W 16 – 15	Malaysia; W 20 – 10	—N/a	1 Q	Fiji; W 25 – 8	South Africa; W 17 – 8	England; L 4 – 22	2nd place, silver medalist(s)
Lynsey Clarke; Karen Murphy; Carla Odgers; Natasha Scott	Fours	Papua New Guinea; W 12 – 10	Jersey; L 13 – 14	Cook Islands; W 19 – 6	Scotland; L 13 – 16	—N/a	3	did not advance			

Mixed para-sport

Athlete	Event	Preliminary round				Semifinals	Final/BM	Rank
Athlete	Event	Match 1	Match 2	Match 3	Rank	Semifinals	Final/BM	Rank
Athlete	Event	Opposition Result	Opposition Result	Opposition Result	Rank	Opposition Result	Opposition Result	Rank
Joy Forster; Bruce Jones; Peter Scott; Tony Scott	Pairs	England; L 13 – 17	Wales; W 24 – 6	Scotland; L 9 – 15	2 Q	Scotland; L 14 – 18	New Zealand; W 14 – 11	3rd place, bronze medalist(s)
Anthony Bonnell; James Reynolds; Tim Slater	Triples	New Zealand; L 8 – 11	South Africa; L 9 – 21	—N/a	3	did not advance		

Officials:Section Manager – Peter Brown, National Coach – Steve Glasson, Assistant Coach – Robert Dobbins, Para-sport Coach – Gary Willis, Team Manager – Faye Luke

== Netball ==
Netball Australia announced a team of 12 athletes. Team – Laura Geitz (captain), Bianca Chatfield (vice-captain), Caitlin Bassett, Tegan Caldwell, Julie Corletto, Kimberlee Green, Renae Hallinan, Sharni Layton, Natalie Medhurst, Kimberley Ravaillion, Madison Robinson, Caitlin Thwaites
Officials: Section Manager – Julie Richardson, Head Coach – Lisa Alexander, Assistant Coach – Michelle den Dekker, Coach – Margaret Caldow, Physiotherapist – Steven Hawkins.

Pool B

Team	Pld	W	L	PF	PA	PD	Pts	Qualification
Australia	5	5	0	322	185	+137	10	Semi-finals
England	5	4	1	293	160	+133	8	Semi-finals
South Africa	5	3	2	249	222	+27	6	
Wales	5	2	3	199	255	−56	4	
Trinidad and Tobago	5	1	4	167	282	−115	2	
Barbados	5	0	5	162	288	−126	0	

Source: glasgow2014.com

24 July 2014
13:30

Report
Australia
63 – 36
Wales

SECC Precinct
Umpires:
Ian Fuller (ENG)
Terrence Peart (JAM)
Reserve umpire:
Marie-Louw Van Der Merve (RSA)
Bassett 24/28 (86%)
Caldwell 12/15 (80%)
Medhurst 8/11 (73%)
Thwaits 19/23 (83%)

James 8/11 (73%)
Lewis 24/35 (69%)
Moseley 4/7 (57%)

26 July 2014
09:30

Report
Australia
49 – 48
England

SECC Precinct
Umpires:
Yvonne Morgan (NZL)
Jonathan Bredin (NZL)
Reserve umpire:
Marie-Louw Van Der Merve (RSA)
Bassett 36/52 (69%)
Caldwell 2/5 (40%)
Medhurst 11/13 (85%)

Corbin 19/24 (79%)
Harten 29/37 (78%)

27 July 2014
11:30

Report
Barbados
27 – 77
Australia

SECC Precinct
Umpires:
Jonathan Bredin (NZL)
Ian Fuller (ENG)
Reserve umpire:
Tracy Smith (ENG)
Browne 6/7 (86%)
Piggott 2/4 (50%)
Thomas 8/11 (73%)
Wharton 11/12 (92%)

Caldwell 35/39 (90%)
Thwaits 42/50 (84%)

28 July 2014
11:30

Report
Trinidad and Tobago
34 – 69
Australia

SECC Precinct
Umpires:
Tracy Smith (ENG)
Yvonne Morgan (NZL)
Reserve umpire:
Ian Fuller (ENG)
Cooper 15/24 (63%)
McCollin 10/15 (67%)
Wilson 9/13 (69%)

Bassett 21/23 (91%)
Caldwell 17/20 (85%)
Medhurst 10/14 (71%)
Thwaits 21/23 (91%)

30 July 2014
09:30

Report
Australia
64 – 40
South Africa

SECC Precinct
Umpires:
Jonathan Bredin (NZL)
Ian Fuller (ENG)
Reserve umpire:
Gary Burgess (ENG)
Bassett 30/33 (91%)
Caldwell 7/10 (70%)
Medhurst 21/23 (91%)
Thwaits 6/6 (100%)

Bootha 4/8 (50%)
Holtzhausen 8/8 (100%)
Myburgh 2/3 (67%)
Potgieter 26/29 (90%)

Semifinal

2 August 2014
12:15

Report
Australia
57 – 42
Jamaica

SECC Precinct
Umpires:
Jonathan Bredin (NZL)
Ian Fuller (ENG)
Reserve umpire:
Gary Burgess (ENG)
Bassett 41/51 (80%)
Medhurst 16/18 (89%)

Beckford 10/13 (77%)
Reid 32/37 (86%)

Gold medal game

3 August 2014
12:30

Report
(silver) New Zealand
40 – 58
Australia (gold)

SSE Hydro
Umpires:
Ian Fuller (ENG)
Gary Burgess (ENG)
Reserve umpire:
Terrence Peart (JAM)
Brown 11/16 (69%)
Latu 7/7 (100%)
Tutaia 22/31 (71%)

Bassett 49/53 (92%)
Medhurst 9/11 (82%)

== Rugby Sevens ==
Australian Rugby Union announced a team of 12 athletes on 7 July 2014.
Team – Cameron Clark, Tom Cusack, Pama Fou, Con Foley, Liam Gill, Greg Jeloudev, Tom Lucas, Sean McMahon, Sam Mayers, James Stannard

Pool D

Team	Pld	W	D	L	PF	PA	PD	Pts	Qualification
Australia	3	3	0	0	120	19	+101	9	Medal competition
England	3	2	0	1	104	15	+89	7	Medal competition
Uganda	3	1	0	2	22	97	−75	5	Bowl competition
Sri Lanka	3	0	0	3	21	136	−115	3	Bowl competition

26 July 2014
10:54

Australia	62–7	Sri Lanka
	Report

Ibrox Stadium, Glasgow

26 July 2014
13:12

Australia	43–5	Uganda
	Report

Ibrox Stadium, Glasgow

26 July 2014
21:48

England	7–15	Australia
	Report

Ibrox Stadium, Glasgow

Quarterfinal

27 July 2014
12:28

Australia	21–19	Wales
	Report

Ibrox Stadium, Glasgow

Semifinal

27 July 2014
18:44

New Zealand	19–7	Australia
	Report

Ibrox Stadium, Glasgow

Bronze medal match

27 July 2014
21:15

Australia	24–0	Samoa
	Report

Ibrox Stadium, Glasgow

== Shooting ==
Shooting Australia announced a team of 29 athletes.

Men
Pistol/Small bore

Athlete	Event	Qualification		Final	
Athlete	Event	Points	Rank	Points	Rank
Blake Blackburn	10 m air pistol	562	14	did not advance	
Daniel Repacholi	10 m air pistol	574	3 Q	199.5	1st place, gold medalist(s)
David Chapman	25 m rapid fire pistol	568	3 Q	23	1st place, gold medalist(s)
Bruce Quick	25 m rapid fire pistol	572	2 Q	8	6
Bruce Quick	50 m pistol	535	8 Q	68.8	8
Daniel Repacholi	50 m pistol	543	4 Q	166.6	3rd place, bronze medalist(s)
Jack Rossiter	10 m air rifle	611.9	10	did not advance	
Dane Sampson	10 m air rifle	613.9	7 Q	77.8	8
Warren Potent	50 m rifle prone	624.5 GR	1 Q	204.3	1st place, gold medalist(s)
Dane Sampson	50 m rifle prone	619.9	4 Q	160.8	4
Michael Brown	50 m rifle 3 positions	1107	13	did not advance	
Dane Sampson	50 m rifle 3 positions	1144	5 Q	391.4	8

Shotgun

Athlete	Event	Qualification		Semifinals		Final/BM	
Athlete	Event	Points	Rank	Points	Rank	Points	Rank
Michael Diamond	Trap	121	1 Q	12	4 QB	11	4
Adam Vella	Trap	114	6 Q	15	1 QG	11	1st place, gold medalist(s)
Russell Mark	Double trap	123	10	did not advance			
Tom Turner	Double trap	128	6 Q	25	6	did not advance	
Paul Adams	Skeet	121	2 Q	11	6	did not advance	
Keith Ferguson	Skeet	115	9	did not advance			

Full bore

Athlete	Event	Stage 1		Stage 2		Stage 3		Total	
Athlete	Event	Points	Rank	Points	Rank	Points	Rank	Points	Rank
James Corbett	Individual	101 – 12v	20	150 – 26v	1	136 – 10v	=10	387 – 48v	11
Geoff Grenfell	Individual	105 – 10v	1	149 – 20v	10	133 – 8v	16	387 – 38v	12
James Corbett; Geoff Grenfell	Pairs	300 – 42v	2	286 – 24v	8	—N/a		586 – 66v	4

Women
Pistol/Small bore

Athlete	Event	Qualification		Semifinals		Final	
Athlete	Event	Points	Rank	Points	Rank	Points	Rank
Emily Esposito	10 m air pistol	373	11	—N/a		did not advance	
Lalita Yauhleuskaya	10 m air pistol	379	2 Q	—N/a		157.7	4
Hayley Chapman	25 m pistol	567	8 Q	12	6	did not advance	
Lalita Yauhleuskaya	25 m pistol	578	2 Q	13	4 QB	10	3rd place, bronze medalist(s)
Emma Adams	10 m air rifle	406.9	14	—N/a		did not advance	
Jennifer Hens	10 m air rifle	409.6	12	—N/a		did not advance	
Jennifer Hens	50 m rifle prone	—N/a				613.3	10
Robyn Ridley	50 m rifle prone	—N/a				615.7	4
Robyn Ridley	50 m rifle 3 positions	568	7 Q	—N/a		384.2	8
Alethea Sedgman	50 m rifle 3 positions	566	10	—N/a		did not advance	

Shotgun

Athlete	Event	Qualification		Semifinals		Final/BM	
Athlete	Event	Points	Rank	Points	Rank	Points	Rank
Laetisha Scanlan	Trap	66	6 Q	14	1 QG	13	1st place, gold medalist(s)
Catherine Skinner	Trap	71	1 Q	9	5	did not advance	
Emma Cox	Double trap	—N/a				85	6
Gaye Shale	Double trap	—N/a				80	7
Laura Coles	Skeet	70	1 Q	15	1 QG	14	1st place, gold medalist(s)
Lauryn Mark	Skeet	68	4 Q	9	6	did not advance	

== Squash ==
Squash Australia announced a team of 10 athletes.

Individual

Athlete	Event	Round of 128	Round of 64	Round of 32	Round of 16	Quarterfinals	Semifinals	Final	
Athlete	Event	Opposition Score	Opposition Score	Opposition Score	Opposition Score	Opposition Score	Opposition Score	Opposition Score	Rank
Ryan Cuskelly	Men's singles	Bye	Maina (KEN); W 3 – 0	Delierre (CAN); W 3 – 2	Simpson (GUE); L 1 – 3	did not advance			
Steven Finitsis	Men's singles	Bye	Lengwe (ZAM); W 3 – 0	Makin (WAL); W 3 – 0	Ghosal (IND); L 2 – 3	did not advance			
Cameron Pilley	Men's singles	Bye	Wilson (TRI); W 3 – 0	Seth (GUY); W 3 – 0	Lobban (SCO); W 3 – 0	Barker (ENG); L 0 – 3	did not advance		
Kasey Brown	Women's singles	—N/a	Bye	Udangawa (SRI); W 3 – 0	Perry (NIR); L 1 – 3	did not advance			
Sarah Cardwell	Women's singles	—N/a	Bye	Cornett (CAN); L 0 – 3	did not advance				
Rachael Grinham	Women's singles	—N/a	Bye	Methsarani (SRI); W 3 – 0	Waters (ENG); L 1 – 3	did not advance			

Doubles

Athlete	Event	Group stage				Round of 16	Quarterfinals	Semifinals	Final	
Athlete	Event	Opposition Score	Opposition Score	Opposition Score	Rank	Opposition Score	Opposition Score	Opposition Score	Opposition Score	Rank
Ryan Cuskelly; Matthew Karwalski	Men's doubles	Gunawardena / Suwaris (SRI); W 2 – 0	Beddoes / Coll (NZL); W 2 – 0	Graham / Gray (NFI); W 2 – 0	1 Q	Franklin / Kyme (BER); W 2 – 0	Clyne / Leitch (SCO); L 0 – 2	did not advance		
David Palmer; Cameron Pilley	Men's doubles	Gautier / Taylor (JER); W 2 – 0	Binnie / Burrowes (JAM); W 2 – 0	—N/a	1 Q	Hindle / Zammit-Lewis (MLT); W 2 – 0	Crawford / Lobban (SCO); W 2 – 0	Selby / Willstrop (ENG); W 2 – 0	Grant / Matthew (ENG); W 2 – 1	1st place, gold medalist(s)
Kasey Brown; Rachael Grinham	Women's doubles	Arnold / Raj (MAS); W 2 – 0	Camilleri / Urquhart (AUS); W 2 – 0	Cauchi / Sultana (MLT); W 2 – 0	1 Q	—N/a	Evans / Saffery (WAL); W 2 – 0	Chinappa / Pallikal (IND); L 1 – 2	Beddoes / Waters (ENG); L 0 – 2	4
Lisa Camilleri; Donna Urquhart	Women's doubles	Cauchi / Sultana (MLT); W 2 – 0	Brown / Grinham (AUS); L 0 – 2	Arnold / Raj (MAS); W 2 – 0	2 Q	—N/a	Duncalf / Massaro (ENG); L 0 – 2	did not advance		
Kasey Brown; Cameron Pilley	Mixed doubles	Arjoon / Fernandes (GUY); W 2 – 0	Arnold / Bong (MAS); W 2 – 0	—N/a	1 Q	Clark / Moran (SCO); W 2 – 0	Coll / Landers-Murphy (NZL); W 2 – 0	Grinham / Palmer (AUS); L 0 – 2	King / Knight (NZL); W 2 – 1	3rd place, bronze medalist(s)
Rachael Grinham; David Palmer	Mixed doubles	Stafford / West (CAY); W 2 – 1	Craig / Perry (NIR); W 2 – 0	Chilambew / Chimfwembe (ZAM); W 2 – 0	1 Q	Creed / Evans (WAL); W 2 – 0	Ghosal / Pallikal (IND); W 2 – 0	Brown / Pilley (AUS); W 2 – 0	Barker / Waters (ENG); W 2 – 0	1st place, gold medalist(s)

Officials: Section Manager – ; Coaches – Sarah Fitz-Gerald, Rodney Eyles

== Swimming ==
After the 2014 Australian Championships and Commonwealth Games Trials, Swimming Australia announced a team of 59 athletes.

Men

Athlete	Event	Heat		Semifinal		Final	
Athlete	Event	Time	Rank	Time	Rank	Time	Rank
Matthew Abood	50 m freestyle	22.09	2 Q	22.07	3 Q	22.14	4
James Magnussen	50 m freestyle	22.33	4 Q	22.23	5 Q	22.10	3rd place, bronze medalist(s)
Cameron McEvoy	50 m freestyle	22.04	1 Q	21.94	2 Q	22.00	2nd place, silver medalist(s)
Tommaso D'Orsogna	100 m freestyle	49.73	6 Q	49.05	3 Q	49.04	3rd place, bronze medalist(s)
James Magnussen	100 m freestyle	48.47	1 Q	48.21	1 Q	48.11	1st place, gold medalist(s)
Cameron McEvoy	100 m freestyle	49.46	2 Q	48.60	2 Q	48.34	2nd place, silver medalist(s)
Matthew Cowdrey	100 m freestyle S9	56.99	2 Q	—N/a		56.33	2nd place, silver medalist(s)
Rowan Crothers	100 m freestyle S9	55.31	1 Q	—N/a		54.58 WR	1st place, gold medalist(s)
Brenden Hall	100 m freestyle S9	57.14	3 Q	—N/a		56.85	3rd place, bronze medalist(s)
Thomas Fraser-Holmes	200 m freestyle	1:47.01	2 Q	—N/a		1:45.08	1st place, gold medalist(s)
Cameron McEvoy	200 m freestyle	1:46.39	1 Q	—N/a		1:45.56	2nd place, silver medalist(s)
David McKeon	200 m freestyle	1:47.99	7 Q	—N/a		1:46.74	4
Joshua Alford	200 m freestyle S14	2:03.99	5 Q	—N/a		2:03.43	6
Daniel Fox	200 m freestyle S14	1:57.16 WR	1 Q	—N/a		1:57.89	1st place, gold medalist(s)
Mitchell Kilduff	200 m freestyle S14	2:01.17	2 Q	—N/a		2:01.37	4
Jordan Harrison	400 m freestyle	3:47.75	8 Q	—N/a		3:48.09	6
Mack Horton	400 m freestyle	3:47.33	7 Q	—N/a		3:44.91	4
David McKeon	400 m freestyle	3:45.23	1 Q	—N/a		3:44.09	2nd place, silver medalist(s)
Jordan Harrison	1500 m freestyle	15:10.88	=6 Q	—N/a		14:55.71	4
Mack Horton	1500 m freestyle	15:08.43	4 Q	—N/a		14:48.76	2nd place, silver medalist(s)
Mathew Levings	1500 m freestyle	15:13.53	9	—N/a		did not advance	
Joshua Beaver	50 m backstroke	25.28	=2 Q	25.20	4 Q	25.19	5
Mitch Larkin	50 m backstroke	25.53	7 Q	25.22	6 Q	24.80	2nd place, silver medalist(s)
Ben Treffers	50 m backstroke	25.28	=2 Q	24.78	1 Q	24.67	1st place, gold medalist(s)
Joshua Beaver	100 m backstroke	53.68	2 Q	53.74	4 Q	53.75	= (bronze)
Mitch Larkin	100 m backstroke	54.18	3 Q	53.33	1 Q	53.59	2nd place, silver medalist(s)
Ben Treffers	100 m backstroke	54.74	6 Q	54.60	8 Q	53.84	5
Joshua Beaver	200 m backstroke	1:58.34	4 Q	—N/a		1:56.19	2nd place, silver medalist(s)
Mitch Larkin	200 m backstroke	1:57.44	1 Q	—N/a		1:55.83	1st place, gold medalist(s)
Matson Lawson	200 m backstroke	1:57.79	2 Q	—N/a		1:56.63	3rd place, bronze medalist(s)
Christian Sprenger	50 m breaststroke	27.57	5 Q	27.11	3 Q	27.46	3rd place, bronze medalist(s)
Kenneth To	50 m breaststroke	29.17	16 Q	29.33	14	did not advance	
Christian Sprenger	100 m breaststroke	1:02.30	11 Q	1:01.73	10	did not advance	
Christian Sprenger	200 m breaststroke	2:11.96	8 Q	—N/a		2:12.69	8
Daniel Tranter	200 m breaststroke	DNS		—N/a		did not advance	
Jayden Hadler	50 m butterfly	23.87	7 Q	23.67	6 Q	23.76	6
Kenneth To	50 m butterfly	24.50	12 Q	24.26	11	did not advance	
Chris Wright	50 m butterfly	23.91	8 Q	23.78	7 Q	23.97	8
Tommaso D'Orsogna	100 m butterfly	53.53	8 Q	52.74	5 Q	52.45	5
Jayden Hadler	100 m butterfly	52.81	2 Q	53.12	8 Q	52.42	4
Chris Wright	100 m butterfly	52.89	3 Q	52.58	4 Q	52.88	8
Grant Irvine	200 m butterfly	1:58.39	7 Q	—N/a		1:56.34	2nd place, silver medalist(s)
Mitchell Pratt	200 m butterfly	1:57.95	4 Q	—N/a		1:57.13	5
Daniel Tranter	200 m butterfly	1:58.30	6 Q	—N/a		1:57.31	6
Thomas Fraser-Holmes	200 m individual medley	2:00.97	8 Q	—N/a		1:58.86	4
Mitch Larkin	200 m individual medley	DNS		—N/a		did not advance	
Daniel Tranter	200 m individual medley	1:59.05	1 Q	—N/a		1:57.83	1st place, gold medalist(s)
Jesse Aungles	200 m individual medley SM8	2:31.97	2 Q	—N/a		2:31.25	2nd place, silver medalist(s)
Blake Cochrane	200 m individual medley SM8	2:34.83	3 Q	—N/a		2:32.72	3rd place, bronze medalist(s)
Thomas Fraser-Holmes	400 m individual medley	4:15.34	4 Q	—N/a		4:12.04	2nd place, silver medalist(s)
Jared Gilliland	400 m individual medley	4:21.78	10	—N/a		did not advance	
Travis Mahoney	400 m individual medley	4:14.99	2 Q	—N/a		4:18.51	6
Matthew Abood; Tommaso D'Orsogna; Jayden Hadler*; James Magnussen; Cameron McEvoy; Ned McKendry*; Kenneth To*	4 × 100 m freestyle relay	3:16.91	1 Q	—N/a		3:13.44 GR	1st place, gold medalist(s)
Thomas Fraser-Holmes; Mack Horton*; Cameron McEvoy; Ned McKendry; David McKeon	4 × 200 m freestyle relay	7:12.85	1 Q	—N/a		7:07.38 GR	1st place, gold medalist(s)
Joshua Beaver*; Tommaso D'Orsogna*; Jayden Hadler; Mitch Larkin; James Magnussen; Cameron McEvoy*; Christian Sprenger; Kenneth To*	4 × 100 m medley relay	3:37.36	1 Q	—N/a		3:32.21	2nd place, silver medalist(s)

Women

Athlete	Event	Heat		Semifinal		Final	
Athlete	Event	Time	Rank	Time	Rank	Time	Rank
Bronte Campbell	50 m freestyle	24.52 GR	3 Q	24.62	5 Q	24.20	3rd place, bronze medalist(s)
Cate Campbell	50 m freestyle	24.33	2 Q	24.17 GR	2 Q	24.00	2nd place, silver medalist(s)
Melanie Schlanger	50 m freestyle	24.87	5 Q	24.59	4 Q	24.39	5
Bronte Campbell	100 m freestyle	54.42	=3 Q	53.67	2 Q	52.86	2nd place, silver medalist(s)
Cate Campbell	100 m freestyle	53.20	1 Q	53.19	1 Q	52.68 GR	1st place, gold medalist(s)
Emma McKeon	100 m freestyle	54.19	2 Q	53.92	3 Q	53.61	3rd place, bronze medalist(s)
Maddison Elliott	100 m freestyle S8	1:06.45	1 Q	—N/a		1:05.32 WR	1st place, gold medalist(s)
Lakeisha Patterson	100 m freestyle S8	1:10.54	3 Q	—N/a		1:08.98	3rd place, bronze medalist(s)
Bronte Barratt	200 m freestyle	1:58.71	8 Q	—N/a		1:56.62	3rd place, bronze medalist(s)
Brittany Elmslie	200 m freestyle	1:59.18	10	—N/a		did not advance	
Emma McKeon	200 m freestyle	1:56.57 GR	1 Q	—N/a		1:55.57 GR	1st place, gold medalist(s)
Jessica Ashwood	400 m freestyle	4:11.23	9	—N/a		did not advance	
Bronte Barratt	400 m freestyle	4:08.81	3 Q	—N/a		4:06.02	3rd place, bronze medalist(s)
Remy Fairweather	400 m freestyle	4:07.35	2 Q	—N/a		4:07.65	6
Jessica Ashwood	800 m freestyle	8:34.21	5 Q	—N/a		8:29.32	6
Alanna Bowles	800 m freestyle	8:25.19	3 Q	—N/a		8:24.74	4
Laura Crockart	800 m freestyle	8:37.22	8 Q	—N/a		8:41.64	8
Belinda Hocking	50 m backstroke	29.01	8 Q	28.87	8 Q	28.58	7
Emily Seebohm	50 m backstroke	28.03	2 Q	27.89 GR	3 Q	27.98	4
Madison Wilson	50 m backstroke	28.60	5 Q	28.40	5 Q	28.86	8
Belinda Hocking	100 m backstroke	59.78	2 Q	59.98	=4 Q	59.93	3rd place, bronze medalist(s)
Emily Seebohm	100 m backstroke	59.51 GR	1 Q	59.59	1 Q	59.37 GR	1st place, gold medalist(s)
Madison Wilson	100 m backstroke	1:01.05	9 Q	1:00.34	7 Q	1:00.45	7
Belinda Hocking	200 m backstroke	2:11.07	3 Q	—N/a		2:07.24 GR	1st place, gold medalist(s)
Emily Seebohm	200 m backstroke	2:11.47	4 Q	—N/a		2:08.51	2nd place, silver medalist(s)
Madison Wilson	200 m backstroke	2:11.53	5 Q	—N/a		2:10.35	6
Sally Hunter	50 m breaststroke	31.13	6 Q	31.60	10	did not advance	
Leiston Pickett	50 m breaststroke	30.70	4 Q	30.64	2 Q	30.59	1st place, gold medalist(s)
Lorna Tonks	50 m breaststroke	31.70	10 Q	31.44	7 Q	31.48	7
Sally Hunter	100 m breaststroke	1:08.42	3 Q	1:07.97	4 Q	1:08.26	4
Leiston Pickett	100 m breaststroke	1:09.46	8 Q	1:08.83	8 Q	1:08.46	5
Lorna Tonks	100 m breaststroke	1:09.03	5 Q	1:07.65	3 Q	1:07.34	2nd place, silver medalist(s)
Katherine Downie	100 m breaststroke SB9	1:24.23	5 Q	—N/a		1:24.04	6
Madeleine Scott	100 m breaststroke SB9	1:22.28	3 Q	—N/a		1:21.38	2nd place, silver medalist(s)
Sally Hunter	200 m breaststroke	2:26.69	4 Q	—N/a		2:23.33	2nd place, silver medalist(s)
Taylor McKeown	200 m breaststroke	2:26.38	3 Q	—N/a		2:22.36	1st place, gold medalist(s)
Tessa Wallace	200 m breaststroke	2:27.77	6 Q	—N/a		2:27.41	8
Alicia Coutts	50 m butterfly	26.43	4 Q	26.49	8 Q	26.52	7
Brittany Elmslie	50 m butterfly	26.18	2 Q	25.91	3 Q	25.91	3rd place, bronze medalist(s)
Madeline Groves	50 m butterfly	26.74	9 Q	26.62	9	did not advance	
Alicia Coutts	100 m butterfly	57.93	1 Q	58.07	3 Q	58.21	4
Ellen Gandy	100 m butterfly	58.92	7 Q	58.48	6 Q	58.93	8
Emma McKeon	100 m butterfly	58.83	6 Q	58.40	4 Q	57.66	3rd place, bronze medalist(s)
Alanna Bowles	200 m butterfly	2:12.31	9	—N/a		did not advance	
Ellen Gandy	200 m butterfly	2:09.96	5 Q	—N/a		2:09.51	7
Madeline Groves	200 m butterfly	2:08.51	1 Q	—N/a		2:08.44	3rd place, bronze medalist(s)
Alicia Coutts	200 m individual medley	2:12.00	2 Q	—N/a		2:10.30	2nd place, silver medalist(s)
Kotuku Ngawati	200 m individual medley	2:17.04	12	—N/a		did not advance	
Emily Seebohm	200 m individual medley	2:14.66	6 Q	—N/a		2:14.37	7
Katherine Downie	200 m individual medley SM10	2:36.76	3 Q	—N/a		2:31.98	2nd place, silver medalist(s)
Madeleine Scott	200 m individual medley SM10	2:44.90	4 Q	—N/a		2:40.61	4
Ellen Gandy	400 m individual medley	4:51.54	10	—N/a		did not advance	
Keryn McMaster	400 m individual medley	4:40.11	4 Q	—N/a		4:36.35	3rd place, bronze medalist(s)
Jessica Pengelly	400 m individual medley	4:42.89	6 Q	—N/a		4:47.00	7
Bronte Campbell; Cate Campbell; Alicia Coutts*; Brittany Elmslie*; Madeline Groves*; Emma McKeon; Melanie Schlanger	4 × 100 m freestyle relay	3:34.57 GR	1 Q	—N/a		3:30.98 WR	1st place, gold medalist(s)
Bronte Barratt; Alicia Coutts; Brittany Elmslie; Remy Fairweather*; Madeline Groves*; Emma McKeon	4 × 200 m freestyle relay	7:57.95	1 Q	—N/a		7:49.90 GR	1st place, gold medalist(s)
Bronte Campbell*; Cate Campbell; Alicia Coutts*; Belinda Hocking*; Sally Hunter*; Emma McKeon; Emily Seebohm; Lorna Tonks	4 × 100 m medley relay	3:59.44	1 Q	—N/a		3:56.23 GR	1st place, gold medalist(s)

Qualifiers for the latter rounds (Q) of all events were decided on a time only basis, therefore positions shown are overall results versus competitors in all heats.
* – Indicates athlete swam in the preliminaries but not in the final race.

Eamon Sullivan withdrew due to injury on 6 June and was replaced by Matthew Abood. Meagen Nay and Jacqueline Freney withdrew due to injury and illness on 7 July and were replaced by Madison Wilson and Lakeisha Patterson respectively.

Officials: Head of Delegation – Michael Scott, National Head Coach – Jacco Verhaeren, Coaches – Brant Best, Peter Bishop, Matthew Brown, Simon Cusack, John Fowlie, Rob Hindmarsh, Craig Jackson, Chris Mooney, Vince Raleigh, Richard Scarce, Rohan Taylor

== Table tennis ==
Table Tennis Australia selected a team of 10 athletes.

Men

Athlete	Event	Preliminary round				Round of 32	Round of 16	Quarterfinals	Semifinals	Final / BM	Rank
Athlete	Event	Match 1	Match 2	Match 3	Rank	Round of 32	Round of 16	Quarterfinals	Semifinals	Final / BM	Rank
Athlete	Event	Opposition Result	Opposition Result	Opposition Result	Rank	Opposition Result	Opposition Result	Opposition Result	Opposition Result	Opposition Result	Rank
William Henzell	Singles	Bye				Rizal (MAS); W 4 – 2	Rumgay (SCO); W 4 – 1	Gao (SIN); L 1 – 4	did not advance		
David Powell	Singles	Muturi (KEN); W 4 – 0	Matlhatsi (BOT); W 4 – 0	—N/a	1 Q	Desai (IND); L 3 – 4	did not advance				
Kane Townsend	Singles	Marsh (JAM); W 4 – 0	Farley (BAR); W 4 – 0	—N/a	1 Q	Toriola (NGR); L 1 – 4	did not advance				
William Henzell; David Powell	Doubles	—N/a				Jayasinghe / Ranasingha (SRI); W 3 – 1	Ho / Thériault (CAN); L 1 – 3	did not advance			
Heming Hu; Chris Yan	Doubles	—N/a				Ferdinand / Pierre (LCA); W 3 – 0	Drinkhall / Pitchford (ENG); L 1 – 3	did not advance			
William Henzell; Heming Hu; David Powell; Kane Townsend; Xin Yan	Team	Saint Lucia; W 3 – 0	Malaysia; W 3 – 2	Zambia; W 3 – 0	1 Q	—N/a		Nigeria; L 2 – 3	did not advance		

Women

Athlete	Event	Preliminary round			Round of 32	Round of 16	Quarterfinals	Semifinals	Final / BM	Rank
Athlete	Event	Match 1	Match 2	Rank	Round of 32	Round of 16	Quarterfinals	Semifinals	Final / BM	Rank
Athlete	Event	Opposition Result	Opposition Result	Rank	Opposition Result	Opposition Result	Opposition Result	Opposition Result	Opposition Result	Rank
Zhenhua Dederko	Singles	Bye			Carey (WAL); W 4 – 3	Feng (SIN); L 1 – 4	did not advance			
Jian Fang Lay	Singles	Bye			Givan (NIR); W 4 – 0	Patkar (IND); W 4 – 3	Owen (WAL); W 4 – 1	Yu (SIN); L 0 – 4	Lin (SIN); L 0 – 4	4
Ziyu Zhang	Singles	Loi (PNG); W 4 – 0	Kwong (MRI); W 4 – 0	1 Q	Luo (CAN); L 3 – 4	did not advance				
Zhenhua Dederko; Ziyu Zhang	Doubles	—N/a			Chung / Quashie (TRI); W 3 – 0	Kumaresan / Patkar (IND); L 2 – 3	did not advance			
Jian Fang Lay; Miao Miao	Doubles	—N/a			Mohamed / Nimal (MDV); W 3 – 0	Ho / le Ferve (ENG); W 3 – 0	Lin / Zhou (SIN); W 3 – 2	Luo / Zhang (CAN); W 3 – 0	Feng / Yu (SIN); L 1 – 3	2nd place, silver medalist(s)
Zhenhua Dederko; Jian Fang Lay; Miao Miao; Melissa Tapper; Ziyu Zhang	Team	Guyana; W 3 – 0	Scotland; W 3 – 0	1 Q	—N/a		Wales; W 3 – 0	Malaysia; L 1 – 3	India; W 3 – 1	3rd place, bronze medalist(s)

Mixed

Athlete	Event	Round of 64	Round of 32	Round of 16	Quarterfinals	Semifinals	Final / BM	Rank
Athlete	Event	Opposition Result	Opposition Result	Opposition Result	Opposition Result	Opposition Result	Opposition Result	Rank
William Henzell; Miao Miao	Doubles	Jackson / Sun (NZL); W 3 – 0	Madurangi / Sirisena (SRI); W 3 – 2	le Ferve / Walker (ENG); W 3 – 2	Feng / Zhan (SIN); L 0 – 3	did not advance		
Heming Hu; Melissa Tapper	Doubles	Ringui / Shah (KEN); W 3 – 0	Wang / Zhang (CAN); L 0 – 3	did not advance				
Jian Fang Lay; David Powell	Doubles	Lewis / Parham (JAM); W 3 – 0	Edwards / Phillips (WAL); W 3 – 0	Achanta / Kumaresan (IND); L 2 – 3	did not advance			
Xin Yan; Ziyu Zhang	Doubles	Foo / Ng (MAS); W 3 – 1	Drinkhall / Drinkhall (ENG); L 0 – 3	did not advance				

Officials: Section Manager – Scott Houston, Head Coach – Jens Lang, Assistant Coach – Nam Ho Oh

== Triathlon ==
Triathlon Australia selected a team of 6 athletes.

Athlete	Event	Swim (1.5 km)	Trans 1	Bike (43 km)	Trans 2	Run (10 km)	Total	Rank
Ryan Bailie	Men's	18:11	0:30	59:45	0:24	31:53	1:50:43	5
Aaron Royale	Men's	18:12	0:31	59:42	0:22	32:16	1:51:03	8
Dan Wilson	Men's	18:44	0:33	59:07	0:22	32:50	1:51:36	9
Ashleigh Gentle	Women's	20:24	0:36	1:06:14	0:27	35:43	2:03:24	9
Emma Jackson	Women's	19:57	0:36	1:03:39	0:24	34:58	1:59.34	5
Emma Moffatt	Women's	19:43	0:38	1:03:50	0:25	36:55	2:01:31	7

Mixed Relay

Athletes	Event	Total Times per Athlete (Swim 250 m, Bike 6 km, Run 1.6 km)	Total Group Time	Rank
Emma Moffatt; Aaron Royale; Emma Jackson; Ryan Bailie	Mixed relay	19:29; 17:22; 19:17; 18:04	1:14:14	3rd place, bronze medalist(s)

== Weightlifting ==
Weightlifting Australia announced a team of 19 athletes on 18 March 2014.

Men

Athlete	Event	Snatch	Clean & Jerk	Total	Rank
Vannara Be	62 kg	116	140	256	9
François Etoundi	77 kg	137	177	314	3rd place, bronze medalist(s)
Malek Chamoun	85 kg	NM	DNS	DNF	
Simplice Ribouem	94 kg	153	196	349	2nd place, silver medalist(s)
Max Dal Santo	105 kg	136	176	312	6
Robert Galsworthy	105 kg	142	183	325	5
Damon Kelly	+105 kg	171	217	388	3rd place, bronze medalist(s)
Christopher Rae	+105 kg	156	180	336	7

Women

Athlete	Event	Snatch	Clean & Jerk	Total	Rank
Tegan Napper	48 kg	68	87	155	4
Socheata Be	53 kg	77	96	173	7
Erika Ropati-Frost	53 kg	76	99	175	5
Seen Lee	58 kg	87	103	190	6
Kylie Lindbeck	75 kg	92	105	197	5
Deborah Acason	+75 kg	108	128	236	4

Powerlifting

Athlete	Event	Total	Rank
Abebe Fekadu	Men's 72 kg	176.6	4
Leigh Skinner	Men's +72 kg	155.7	9
Ben Wright	Men's +72 kg	152.1	10
Jessica Formosa	Women's +61 kg	57.3	4

Officials:

- Dr Robin Mitchell (section manager)
- Michael Keelan (head coach)
- Jourik Sarkisian (coach)
- Miles Wydall (coach)
- Anthony Dove (coach)
- Scott Upston (EAD Powerlifting)
- William Nancarrow ( EAD Powerlifting coach)

== Wrestling ==
Wrestling Australia announced a team of nine athletes on 30 May 2014.
Only freestyle wrestling events are being held in Glasgow.

Men

Athlete	Event	Round of 32	Round of 16	Quarterfinal	Semifinal	Repechage	Final / BM	
Athlete	Event	Opposition Result	Opposition Result	Opposition Result	Opposition Result	Opposition Result	Opposition Result	Rank
Shane Parker	57 kg	—N/a	Harper (SCO); W 4 – 0	Hussain (PAK); L 1 – 4	did not advance			
Deon Swart	61 kg	—N/a	Ramm (ENG); L 1 – 4	did not advance				
Mehrdad Tarash	65 kg	Koczarian (NIR); W 3 – 1	van Rensburg (RSA); L 0 – 5	did not advance				
Jayden Lawrence	74 kg	Bye	Kumar (IND); L 0 – 4	did not advance		Sandrage (SRI); W 5 – 0	Bibo (NGR); L 0 – 5	4
Ali Abdo	86 kg	—N/a	Tagziev (CAN); L 0 – 4	did not advance		Inam (PAK); L 0 – 5	did not advance	

Women

Athlete	Event	Round of 16	Quarterfinal	Semifinal	Repechage	Final / BM	
Athlete	Event	Opposition Result	Opposition Result	Opposition Result	Opposition Result	Opposition Result	Rank
Rupinder Kaur	53 kg	—N/a	Letchidjio (CMR); L 0 – 5	did not advance			
Carissa Holland	58 kg	Bye	Ford (NZL); L 0 – 5	did not advance			
Stevie Grace Kelly	63 kg	Bye	Connolly (WAL); L 0 – 4	did not advance			

== See also ==
- Australia at the 2012 Summer Olympics
- Australia at the 2016 Summer Olympics
