= Cycling at the 2014 Commonwealth Games – Men's tandem 1 km time trial B =

Cycling Track – Men's tandem 1km time trial B at the 2014 Commonwealth Games
- Venue: Sir Chris Hoy Velodrome
- Dates: 25 July 2014
- Competitors: 5 from 4 nations

Medalists
gold medal	Neil Fachie; Craig MacLean (Pilot)	Scotland
silver medal	Kieran Modra; Jason Niblett (Pilot)	Australia
bronze medal	Matt Ellis; Ieuan Williams (Pilot)	Wales

The Men's tandem 1 km time trial B at the 2014 Commonwealth Games, was part of the cycling programme, which took place on 25 July 2014.

== Results ==
Rank	Country	Riders	Time	Average Speed (km/h)
1st place, gold medalist(s)	Scotland	Neil Fachie; Craig MacLean (Pilot)	1:02.096 GR	57.974
2nd place, silver medalist(s)	Australia	Kieran Modra; Jason Niblett (Pilot)	1:02.244	57.836
3rd place, bronze medalist(s)	Wales	Matt Ellis; Ieuan Williams (Pilot)	1:04.095	56.166
4	Australia	Paul Kennedy; Thomas Clarke (Pilot)	1:05.261	55.163
5	Northern Ireland	James Brown; Dave Readle (Pilot)	1:09.413	51.863
