= Cycling at the 2014 Commonwealth Games – Women's tandem 1 km time trial B =

Cycling Track – Women's tandem 1km time trial B at the 2014 Commonwealth Games
- Venue: Sir Chris Hoy Velodrome
- Dates: 27 July 2014
- Competitors: 6 from 4 nations

Medalists
gold medal	Sophie Thornhill; Helen Scott (Pilot)	England
silver medal	Aileen McGlynn; Louise Haston (Pilot)	Scotland
bronze medal	Brandie O'Connor; Breanna Hargrave (Pilot)	Australia

The Women's tandem 1 km time trial B at the 2014 Commonwealth Games, was part of the cycling programme, which took place on 27 July 2014.

== Results ==
Rank	Country	Riders	Time	Average Speed (km/h)	Notes
1st place, gold medalist(s)	England	Sophie Thornhill; Helen Scott (Pilot)	1:08.187	52.795	GR
2nd place, silver medalist(s)	Scotland	Aileen McGlynn; Louise Haston (Pilot)	1:09.771	51.597	
3rd place, bronze medalist(s)	Australia	Brandie O'Connor; Breanna Hargrave (Pilot)	1:10.543	51.032	
4	Australia	Felicity Johnson; Holly Takos (Pilot)	1:11.826	50.121	
5	Scotland	Laura Cluxton; Fiona Duncan (Pilot)	1:12.132	49.908	
6	Wales	Rhiannon Henry; Rachel James (Pilot)	1:12.719	49.505	
