= Cycling at the 2014 Commonwealth Games – Men's tandem sprint B =

Part of cycling programme

Cycling Track – Men's tandem sprint B at the 2014 Commonwealth Games
- Venue: Sir Chris Hoy Velodrome
- Dates: 26 July 2014
- Competitors: 10 from 4 nations

Medalists
gold medal	Neil Fachie; Craig MacLean (Pilot)	Scotland
silver medal	Kieran Modra; Jason Niblett (Pilot)	Australia
bronze medal	Paul Kennedy; Thomas Clarke (Pilot)	Australia

The Men's tandem sprint B at the 2014 Commonwealth Games, was part of the cycling programme, which took place on 26 July 2014.

== Results ==
=== Qualifying ===
Rank	Country	Riders	Time	Average Speed (km/h)	Notes
1	Australia	Kieran Modra; Jason Niblett (Pilot)	10.050 GR	71.641	Q
2	Scotland	Neil Fachie; Craig MacLean (Pilot)	10.213	70.498	Q
3	Wales	Matt Ellis; Ieuan Williams (Pilot)	10.409	69.170	Q
4	Australia	Paul Kennedy; Thomas Clarke (Pilot)	10.593	67.969	Q
5	Northern Ireland	James Brown; Dave Readle (Pilot)	11.406	63.124	

=== Semi-finals ===
Heat	Rank	Country	Riders	Race 1	Race 2	Race 3	Notes
1	1	Australia	Kieran Modra; Jason Niblett (Pilot)	11.381 (63.263 km/h)	11.816 (60.934 km/h)		Q
1	2	Australia	Paul Kennedy; Thomas Clarke (Pilot)				
2	1	Scotland	Neil Fachie; Craig MacLean (Pilot)	10.993 (65.496 km/h)	10.981 (65.567 km/h)		Q
2	2	Wales	Matt Ellis; Ieuan Williams (Pilot)				

=== Finals ===
Rank	Country	Riders	Race 1	Race 2	Race 3
1st place, gold medalist(s)	Scotland	Neil Fachie; Craig MacLean (Pilot)		10.920 (65.934 km/h)	10.874 (66.212 km/h)
2nd place, silver medalist(s)	Australia	Kieran Modra; Jason Niblett (Pilot)	11.167 (64.475 km/h)		
3rd place, bronze medalist(s)	Australia	Paul Kennedy; Thomas Clarke (Pilot)	10.891 (66.109 km/h)	11.185 (64.371 km/h)	
4	Wales	Matt Ellis; Ieuan Williams (Pilot)			
