= Cycling at the 2014 Commonwealth Games – Women's tandem sprint B =

Cycling Track – Women's tandem sprint B at the 2014 Commonwealth Games
- Venue: Sir Chris Hoy Velodrome
- Dates: 24 July 2014
- Competitors: 6 from 4 nations

Medalists
gold medal	Sophie Thornhill; Helen Scott (Pilot)	England
silver medal	Aileen McGlynn; Louise Haston (Pilot)	Scotland
bronze medal	Brandie O'Connor; Breanna Hargrave (Pilot)	Australia

The Women's tandem sprint B at the 2014 Commonwealth Games, was part of the cycling programme, which took place on 24 July 2014.

== Results ==
=== Qualifying ===
Rank	Country	Riders	Time	Average Speed (km/h)	Notes
1	England	Sophie Thornhill; Helen Scott (Pilot)	11.277 GR	63.846	Q
2	Scotland	Aileen McGlynn; Louise Haston (Pilot)	11.419	63.052	Q
3	Australia	Brandie O'Connor; Breanna Hargrave (Pilot)	11.623	61.946	Q
4	Australia	Felicity Johnson; Holly Takos (Pilot)	11.695	61.564	Q
5	Wales	Rhiannon Henry; Rachel James (Pilot)	11.917	60.417	
6	Scotland	Laura Cluxton; Fiona Duncan (Pilot)	11.929	60.357	

=== Semi-finals ===
Heat	Rank	Country	Riders	Race 1	Race 2	Race 3	Notes
1	1	England	Sophie Thornhill; Helen Scott (Pilot)	12.390 (58.111 km/h)	12.318 (58.451 km/h)		Q
1	2	Australia	Felicity Johnson; Holly Takos (Pilot)				
2	1	Scotland	Aileen McGlynn; Louise Haston (Pilot)	12.274 (58.660 km/h)	12.199 (59.021 km/h)		Q
2	2	Australia	Brandie O'Connor; Breanna Hargrave (Pilot)				

=== Finals ===
Rank	Country	Riders	Race 1	Race 2	Race 3
1st place, gold medalist(s)	England	Sophie Thornhill; Helen Scott (Pilot)	12.021 (59.895 km/h)	12.319 (58.446 km/h)	
2nd place, silver medalist(s)	Scotland	Aileen McGlynn; Louise Haston (Pilot)			
3rd place, bronze medalist(s)	Australia	Brandie O'Connor; Breanna Hargrave (Pilot)	12.596 (57.161 km/h)	12.409 (58.022 km/h)	
4	Australia	Felicity Johnson; Holly Takos (Pilot)			
5	Scotland	Laura Cluxton; Fiona Duncan (Pilot)	12.860 (55.987 km/h)		
6	Wales	Rhiannon Henry; Rachel James (Pilot)			
