= Cycling at the 2014 Commonwealth Games – Women's sprint =

Cycling Track – Women's sprint at the 2014 Commonwealth Games
- Venue: Sir Chris Hoy Velodrome
- Dates: 26–27 July 2014
- Competitors: 13 from 7 nations

Medalists
gold medal	Stephanie Morton	Australia
silver medal	Anna Meares	Australia
bronze medal	Jess Varnish	England

The Women's sprint at the 2014 Commonwealth Games, as part of the cycling programme, took place on 26 and 27 July 2014.

== Results ==
=== Qualification ===
Rank	Rider	Time	Avg speed (km/h)	Notes
1	Stephanie Morton (AUS)	10.984	65.549	Q, GR
2	Anna Meares (AUS)	11.171	64.452	Q
3	Jess Varnish (ENG)	11.279	63.835	Q
4	Stephanie Mckenzie (NZL)	11.336	63.514	Q
5	Fatehah Mustapa (MAS)	11.433	62.975	Q
6	Victoria Williamson (ENG)	11.529	62.451	Q
7	Jenny Davis (SCO)	11.580	62.176	Q
8	Danni Khan (ENG)	11.661	61.744	Q
9	Eleanor Richardson (SCO)	12.211	58.963	
10	Deborah (IND)	12.483	57.678	
11	Mahitha Mohan (IND)	13.059	55.134	
12	Kezia Vargheese (IND)	13.162	54.702	
13	Dahlia Palmer (JAM)	15.220	47.306	

=== Quarter-finals ===
Heat	Rank	Rider	Race 1	Race 2	Race 3	Notes
1	1	Stephanie Morton (AUS)	11.639	11.596		Q
1	2	Danni Khan (ENG)				
2	1	Anna Meares (AUS)	12.719	12.032		Q
2	2	Jenny Davis (SCO)				
3	1	Jess Varnish (ENG)	11.942	12.099		Q
3	2	Victoria Williamson (ENG)				
4	1	Fatehah Mustapa (MAS)	12.139	12.184		Q
4	2	Stephanie Mckenzie (NZL)				

=== Semi-finals ===
Heat	Rank	Rider	Race 1	Race 2	Race 3	Notes
1	1	Stephanie Morton (AUS)	11.920	11.898		Q
1	2	Fatehah Mustapa (MAS)				
2	1	Anna Meares (AUS)	12.004	11.675		Q
2	2	Jess Varnish (ENG)				

=== 5th–8th Places ===
Rank	Rider	Time	Avg speed (km/h)	Notes
5	Victoria Williamson (ENG)	12.356	58.271	
6	Stephanie Mckenzie (NZL)			
7	Danni Khan (ENG)			
8	Jenny Davis (SCO)			

=== Finals ===
Rank	Rider	Race 1	Race 2	Race 3	Notes
Gold Medal Races
1st place, gold medalist(s)	Stephanie Morton (AUS)	11.734 (61.360 km/h)	11.422 (63.036 km/h)		
2nd place, silver medalist(s)	Anna Meares (AUS)				
Bronze Medal Races
3rd place, bronze medalist(s)	Jess Varnish (ENG)	11.944 (60.281 km/h)	11.856 (60.728 km/h)		
4	Fatehah Mustapa (MAS)				
