= Athletics at the 2014 Commonwealth Games – Women's long jump (F37/38) =

The Women's long jump (T37/38) at the 2014 Commonwealth Games as part of the athletics programme was held at Hampden Park on 27 July 2014.

The T37/38 long jump was open to athletes with cerebral palsy under the T37 and T38 classifications. As T37 competitors are deemed to have a greater lack of mobility than T38 athletes a points system is used to bring a form of parity to the results. Therefore, T38 athletes may clear a greater distance but could be ranked lower in the final table than a T37 athlete.

== Results ==
Rank	Name	Classification	Distance	Notes
1st place, gold medalist(s)	Jodi Elkington (AUS)	T37	4.39	WL
2nd place, silver medalist(s)	Bethy Woodward (ENG)	T37	4.00	PB
3rd place, bronze medalist(s)	Johanna Benson (NAM)	T37	3.82	PB
4	Olivia Breen (WAL)	T38	4.06	
5	Juanelie Meijer (RSA)	T38	4.06	
6	Beverley Jones (WAL)	T37	3.71	
7	Rae Anderson (AUS)	T37	3.67	
8	Fiona Clarke (ENG)	T38	3.79	
9	Ella Pardy (AUS)	T38	3.62	
10	Latifat Balogun (NGR)	T38	3.54	
11	Igolukumo Ekioukeowei (NGR)	T38	2.37	
