= Cycling at the 2014 Commonwealth Games – Men's individual pursuit =

Cycling Track – Men's individual pursuit at the 2014 Commonwealth Games
- Venue: Sir Chris Hoy Velodrome
- Dates: 24–25 July 2014
- Competitors: 19 from 10 nations

Medalists
gold medal	Jack Bobridge	Australia
silver medal	Alex Edmondson	Australia
bronze medal	Marc Ryan	New Zealand

The Men's individual pursuit at the 2014 Commonwealth Games, was part of the cycling programme, which took place on 25 July 2014.

== Results ==
=== Qualifying ===
Rank	Rider	Time	Average Speed (km/h)	Notes
1	Jack Bobridge (AUS)	4:19.211	55.553	Q
2	Alex Edmondson (AUS)	4:20.853	55.203	Q
3	Owain Doull (WAL)	4:21.369	55.094	Q
4	Marc Ryan (NZL)	4:22.511	54.854	Q
5	Andy Tennant (ENG)	4:23.723	54.602	
6	Miles Scotson (AUS)	4:24.819	54.376	
7	Patrick Bevin (NZL)	4:26.909	53.950	
8	Dylan Kennett (NZL)	4:26.930	53.946	
9	Remi Pelletier (CAN)	4:28.525	53.626	
10	Steven Burke (ENG)	4:31.752	52.989	
11	Mark Stewart (SCO)	4:32.279	52.886	
12	Ed Veal (CAN)	4:33.775	52.597	
13	Theuns van der Bank (RSA)	4:40.041	51.421	
14	Morne van Niekerk (RSA)	4:44.415	50.630	
15	Oupa Maluleke (RSA)	4:48.368	49.936	
16	Manjeet Singh (IND)	4:55.164	48.786	
17	Sombir (IND)	4:57.202	48.451	
18	Amit Kumar (IND)	4:58.444	48.250	
19	Muhammad Shakeel (PAK)	DNS		

=== Finals ===
Rank	Rider	Time	Average Speed (km/h)	Notes
Gold Medal Races
1st place, gold medalist(s)	Jack Bobridge (AUS)	4:19.650	55.459	
2nd place, silver medalist(s)	Alex Edmondson (AUS)	4:24.620	54.417	
Bronze Medal Races
3rd place, bronze medalist(s)	Marc Ryan (NZL)	4:23.559	54.636	
4	Owain Doull (WAL)	4:25.664	54.203	
