= Cycling at the 2014 Commonwealth Games – Women's 500 m time trial =

Cycling Track – Women's 500 m time trial at the 2014 Commonwealth Games
- Venue: Sir Chris Hoy Velodrome
- Dates: 24 July 2014
- Competitors: 14 from 8 nations

Medalists
gold medal	Anna Meares	Australia
silver medal	Stephanie Morton	Australia
bronze medal	Jess Varnish	England

The Women's 500 m time trial at the 2014 Commonwealth Games, was part of the cycling programme, which took place on 24 July 2014. The winner Anna Meares, retained her title from the 2010 Women's 500 m time trial event.

== Results ==
Rank	Rider	Time	Average Speed (km/h)
1st place, gold medalist(s)	Anna Meares (AUS)	33.435 GR	53.835
2nd place, silver medalist(s)	Stephanie Morton (AUS)	34.079	52.818
3rd place, bronze medalist(s)	Jess Varnish (ENG)	34.267	52.528
4	Stephanie Mckenzie (NZL)	34.444	52.258
5	Fatehah Mustapa (MAS)	34.667	51.922
6	Danni Khan (ENG)	35.420	50.818
7	Victoria Williamson (ENG)	35.465	50.754
8	Eleanor Richardson (SCO)	36.147	49.796
9	Jenny Davis (SCO)	36.179	49.752
10	Deborah (IND)	36.611	49.165
11	Mahitha Mohan (IND)	38.869	46.309
12	Dahlia Palmer (JAM)	39.041	46.105
13	Kezia Vargheese (IND)	39.387	45.700
14	Rahila Bano (PAK)	DNS	
