= Swimming at the 2014 Commonwealth Games – Men's 100 metre freestyle S9 =

Men's 100 metre freestyle S9 at the 2014 Commonwealth Games
- Venue: Tollcross International Swimming Centre
- Dates: 24 July 2014
- Competitors: 5 from 3 nations
- Winning time: 54.58 WR

Medalists
gold medal	Rowan Crothers	Australia
silver medal	Matthew Cowdrey	Australia
bronze medal	Brenden Hall	Australia

The men's 100 metre freestyle S9 event at the 2014 Commonwealth Games as part of the swimming programme took place on 24 July at the Tollcross International Swimming Centre in Glasgow, Scotland.

The medals were presented by Sir Philip Craven, President of the International Paralympic Committee and the quaichs were presented by David Grevemberg, CEO of Glasgow 2014.

== Records ==
Prior to this competition, the existing world and Commonwealth Games records were as follows.

World record	Matthew Cowdrey (AUS)	55.20	Adelaide, Australia	19 March 2012
Commonwealth record				
Games record	N/A	N/A	N/A	N/A

The following records were established during the competition:

Date	Event	Name	Nationality	Time	Record
24 July	Heat	Rowan Crothers	Australia	54.58	WR

== Results ==
=== Heats ===
Rank	Heat	Lane	Name	Nationality	Time	Notes
1	1	4	Rowan Crothers	Australia	55.31	Q
2	1	5	Matthew Cowdrey	Australia	56.99	Q
3	1	3	Brenden Hall	Australia	57.14	Q
4	1	6	Prasanta Karmakar	India	1:04.86	Q
5	1	2	Scody Victor	Mauritius	1:19.08	Q

=== Final ===
Rank	Lane	Name	Nationality	Time	Notes
1st place, gold medalist(s)	4	Rowan Crothers	Australia	54.58	WR
2nd place, silver medalist(s)	5	Matthew Cowdrey	Australia	56.33	
3rd place, bronze medalist(s)	3	Brenden Hall	Australia	56.85	
4	6	Prasanta Karmakar	India	1:04.73	
5	2	Scody Victor	Mauritius	1:18.89	
