= Breanna Hargrave =

Australian track cyclist

Personal information
- Born: 9 February 1983 (age 43) Adelaide

Cycling career
- Sport: Cycling
- Discipline: Track cycling
- Role: Rider
Medal record
Women's track cycling
Representing Australia
Commonwealth Games
Bronze medal – third place	2014 Glasgow	Tandem sprint B
Bronze medal – third place	2014 Glasgow	Tandem 1km time trial B

Breanna Hargrave (born 9 February 1983) is an Australian track cyclist.

Hargrave moved from athletics to track cycling at 28 years old as part of a ‘talent transfer’ program at the South Australian Sports Institute. She runs a physiotherapy practice in Norwood, South Australia. She won two bronze medals with Brandie O’Connor in the tandem events at the 2014 Commonwealth Games. She is also a five time Australian Champion and a 20 time National Championship Medallist and a 6 time Oceania Championship Medallist. Hargrave was selected to represent Australia aged 39 at the 2022 Commonwealth Games to compete against athletes half her age after Hargrave broke an eight-year-old Aussie record set by Anna Meares for the 500-metre time trial at the Adelaide SuperDrome.
