= Brandie O'Connor =

Australian bicycle racer

Personal information
- Nationality: Australia
- Born: 24 December 1973 (age 52) Brisbane

Sport
- Sport: Para-cycling
- Disability: Visual impairment
- Club: Vikings Cycling Club
- Coached by: Alex Bird
Medal record
Women's para-cycling
Representing Australia
UCI Para-cycling Track World Championships
Silver medal – second place	2014 Aguascalientes	Women's tandem sprint B
Silver medal – second place	2014 Aguascalientes	Women's tandem 1 km time trial B
Silver medal – second place	2015 Appledoon	Women’s Tandem Sprint
Commonwealth Games
Bronze medal – third place	2014 Glasgow	Women's tandem sprint B
Bronze medal – third place	2014 Glasgow	Women's tandem 1 km time trial B

Brandie O’Connor (born 24 December 1973) is a vision impaired Australian paracyclist and has won medals at the World Championships and Commonwealth Games..

== Personal ==
O'Connor was born on 24 December 1973 in Brisbane, Queensland. She was born with rod monochromatism which affects her ability to see. O’Connor describes her condition, "what I see at 6 meters, 'normal' eyes see at 60 meters." She has a Bachelor of Commerce and works as a policy officer.

== Career ==
In 2006, O’Connor started training and identified a pilot (person who is fully sighted and steers the bike) in Kerry Knowler. Breaking her clavicle and two ribs in a cycling accident this put O’Connor out of action until late 2007. O’Connor tried adaptive rowing and tried for the Beijing Paralympics but missed out. She made her international cycling debut at the 2010 UCI Paracycling Road World Championships in Canada. In 2012, she competed at the UCI Para-cycling Track World Championships in Los Angeles, United States and finished fourth in the Women's Individual Time Trial and fifth in the 3 km Pursuit. With pilot Breanna Hargrave, she won silver medals in the Women's Tandem Sprint and Tandem 1 km Time Trial at the 2014 UCI Para-Cycling Track World Championships. O'Connor and Hargrave won bronze medals in the Women's Tandem Sprint B and Women's Tandem 1 km Time Trial B at the 2014 Commonwealth Games in Glasgow, Scotland. At the 2015, UCI Para-cycling Track World Championships in Apledoorn, Netherlands, O'Connor and Hargrave won a silver medal in the Women's Tandem Sprint and fifth in the Women 1 km Time Trial.
