= Jodi Elkington-Jones =

Australian Paralympic athlete (born 1993)

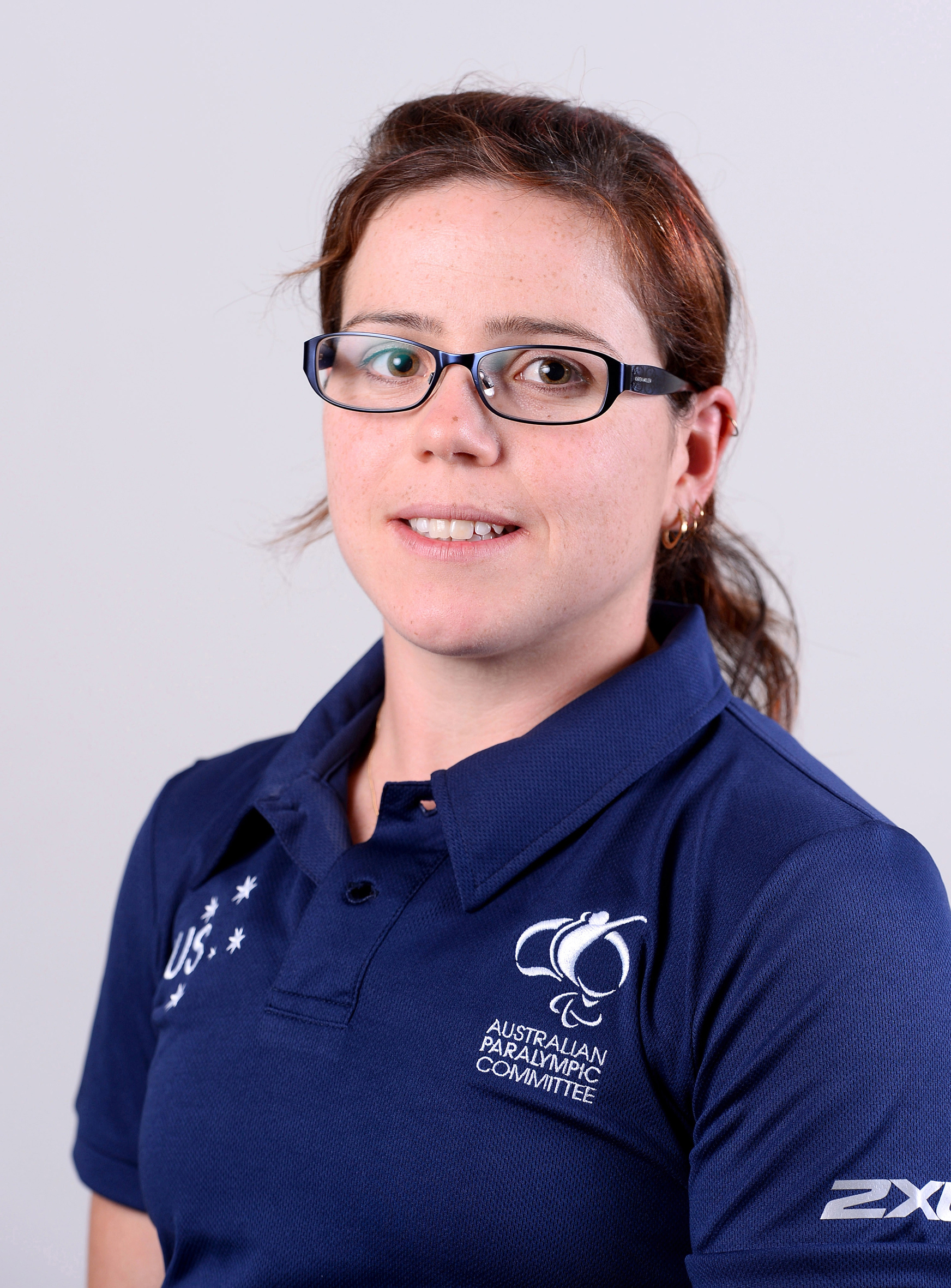
- 2016 Australian Paralympic team portrait of Elkington

Personal information
- Nationality: Australian
- Born: 17 May 1993 (age 33) Wodonga, Victoria

Sport
- Country: Australia
- Sport: Athletics
- Events: 100 m, 200 m, Long Jump
- Club: Wodonga Athletics Club
Medal record
Track and field (athletics) T37
Paralympic Games
Bronze medal – third place	2016 Rio	Women's Long Jump T37
Bronze medal – third place	2016 Rio	Women's 4×100 m relay - T35-38
Commonwealth Games
Gold medal – first place	2014 Glasgow	Women's long jump (F37/38)

Jodi Elkington-Jones (born 17 May 1993) is an Australian athlete who has cerebral palsy. She represented Australia at the 2012 Summer Paralympics and has also competed in two Commonwealth Games, winning gold in the 2014 Games in the F37/38 long jump. She represented Australia at the 2016 Rio Paralympics in athletics.

== Personal ==
Elkington was born on 17 May 1993 in Wodonga, Victoria. At the age of eighteen months, she was diagnosed with cerebral palsy and this effects her mobility on the right side of her body. Her cousin is runner Jarrem Pearce. Elkington went to school at Wodonga South Primary School. Outside of athletics Elinkton enjoys netball, umpiring games. She married Warrick Jones in May 2015.

== Athletics ==
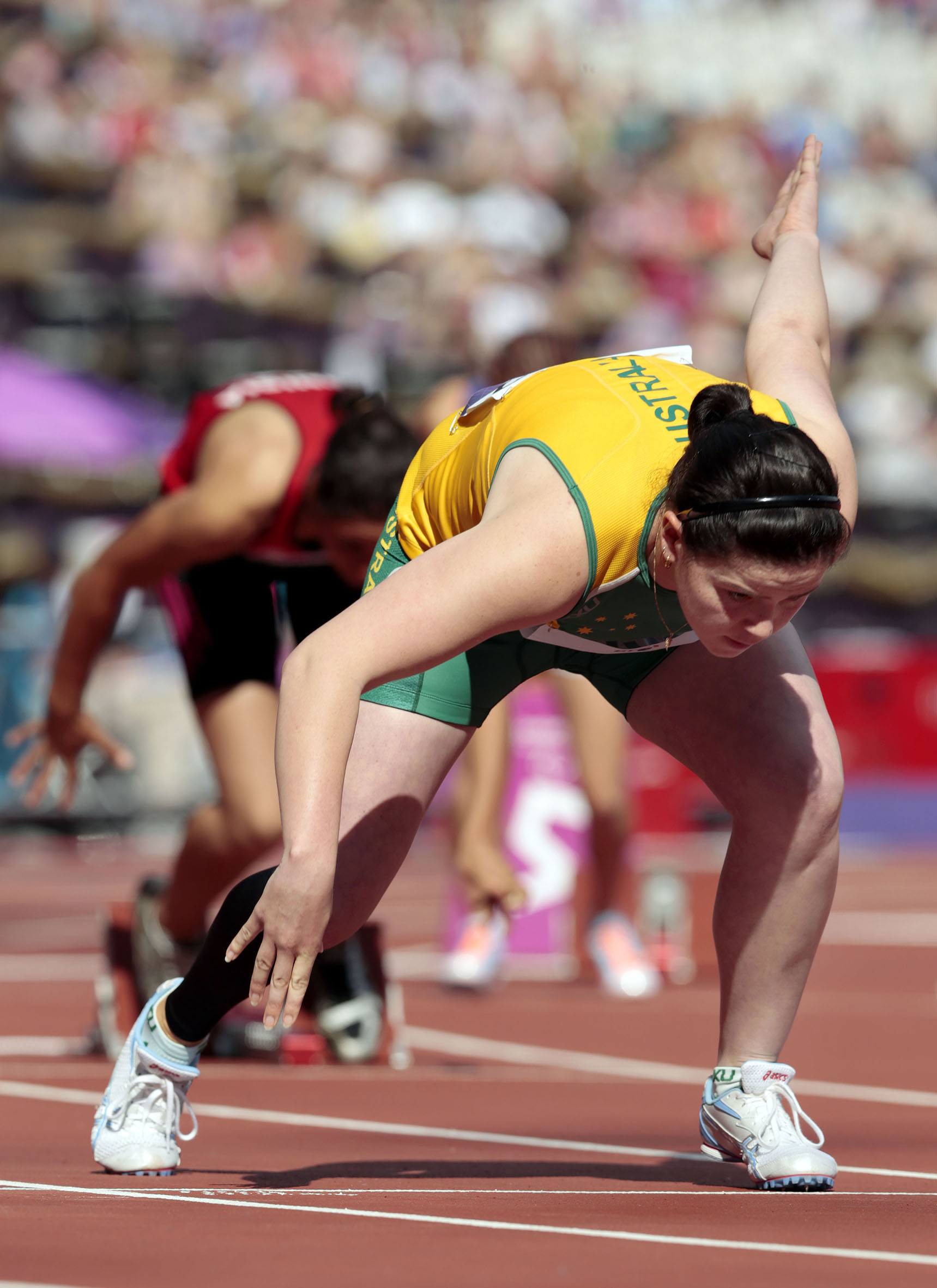
Elkington at the 2012 London Paralympics

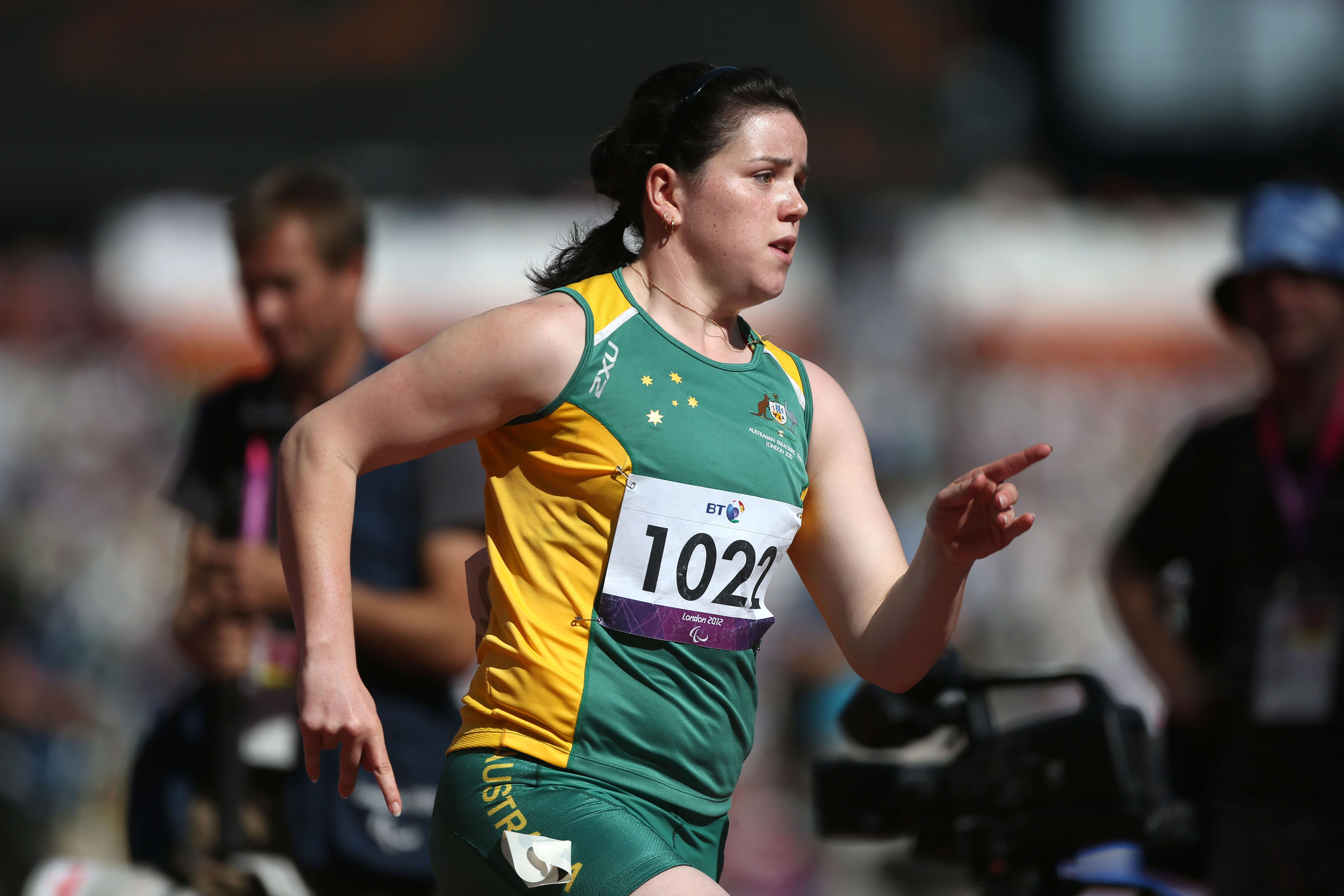
Elkington at the 2012 London Paralympics

Elkington is a T37 classified athlete competing in 100 m, 200 m and long jump events. She is a member of the Wodonga Athletics Club.

She first became involved in Paralympic sport in year six when her school teacher Leon Price convinced her to try swimming. She represented Victoria at a State level for three years but was forced to give up swimming after injuries to her right elbow that required corrective surgery. Elkington started competing in athletics in 2008, following a 2007 Australian Paralympic talent search event. She became a member of Wodonga Athletics Track and under local coach, Greg Simpson she was selected to represent Victoria at the Pacific School Games in Canberra in 2008.

She first represented Australia at the 2010 Commonwealth Games. In the T37 100 m race, she finished fourth with a time of 15.08. While there, she had health issues related to the food. She was Australia's only elite athlete with a disability at the Games. At the 2011 Australian Athletics Championships, she finished second in the 200 m event. She competed in the 2011 IPC Athletics World Championships in four events with her best result being fourth in the Women's 400 m T37. She competed in the 2012 Australian Athletics Championships. With a time of 70.42 seconds, she won the 400 metre event.

Prior to the 2012 London Paralympics, she was an Australian Institute of Sport (AIS) scholarship holder and was coached by Iryna Dvoskina. Elkington finished 6th fastest in the Women's T37 400m at the 2012 London Games with a time of 1:11.49. She also placed 4th with the rest of her team in the Women's 4 × 100 m Relay – T35/T38 class.

After the London Paralympics, gave up athletics for a short period due to the pressures of being an AIS athlete. At the 2014 Commonwealth Games in Glasgow, she won the gold medal in the Women's Long Jump T37/38.

At the 2015 IPC Athletics World Championships in Doha, she finished fifth in the Women's Long Jump T37 and twelfth in the Women's 100 m T37.

At the 2016 Rio Paralympics, she won the bronze medal in the Women's Long Jump T37 with a jump of 4.30m.

In 2015, she lives in Sydney and is a New South Wales Institute of Sport scholarship holder.
