= Michael Scott (sports administrator) =

Australian sports administrator

Michael Scott (born 9 February 1956) is a leading Australian sports administrator. He was the inaugural Director of the New South Wales Institute of Sport and the sixth Director of the Australian Institute of Sport. In September 2017, he was appointed chief executive officer of High Performance Sport New Zealand.

== Personal ==
He was born on 9 February 1956 in Melbourne, Victoria. He has a Master of Science in Physical Education, Eastern Kentucky University. His son is Gavin Scott, born in 1993. He has just completed his Honours year at the University of Melbourne. His daughter, Tara Scott, was born 14 August 1996. Tara has battled type one diabetes since she was 11 years old.

== Sporting career ==
Scott was a swimming and surf life saving representative for Victoria. His first job in sport was as Head Coach of the Women's Swimming Team Miami University of Ohio. From 1991 to 1994, he was Director of Sport and Recreation Victoria. From 1994 to 1997, he was the Chief Executive of South Australian Department of Sport and Recreation. In 1997, he was appointed the inaugural Director of the New South Wales Institute of Sport. In 2001, he was appointed the sixth Director of the Australian Institute of Sport, a position which he held until 2005. From 2005 to 2007, he was the chief executive officer for the 2007 World Aquatics Championships. In 2008, he was appointed National Performance director for British Swimming. He resigned from the position in November 2012 after a review required him to work full-time in Great Britain. Whilst holding the position, he split his time between Australia and Great Britain. In April 2013, he was appointed Director of High Performance at Swimming Australia. In February 2015, he accepted the position of CEO of Rowing Australia. In September 2017, he was appointed chief executive officer of High Performance Sport New Zealand.

Other sports administration positions held by Scott include: Chairman of the National Elite Sports Council (1999), Board Member of the Victorian Institute of Sport (1993–1994) and Team Manager of the Australian Paralympic Swim Team at the 2000 Sydney Paralympics.

== Recognition ==
- 1999 - Sports Federation of New South Wales Sports Administrator of the Year Award
- 2000 - Sport Industry Australia's Sport's Great Achiever Award
- 2000 - Australian Sports Medal
