= Jason Niblett =

Australian cyclist (born 1983)

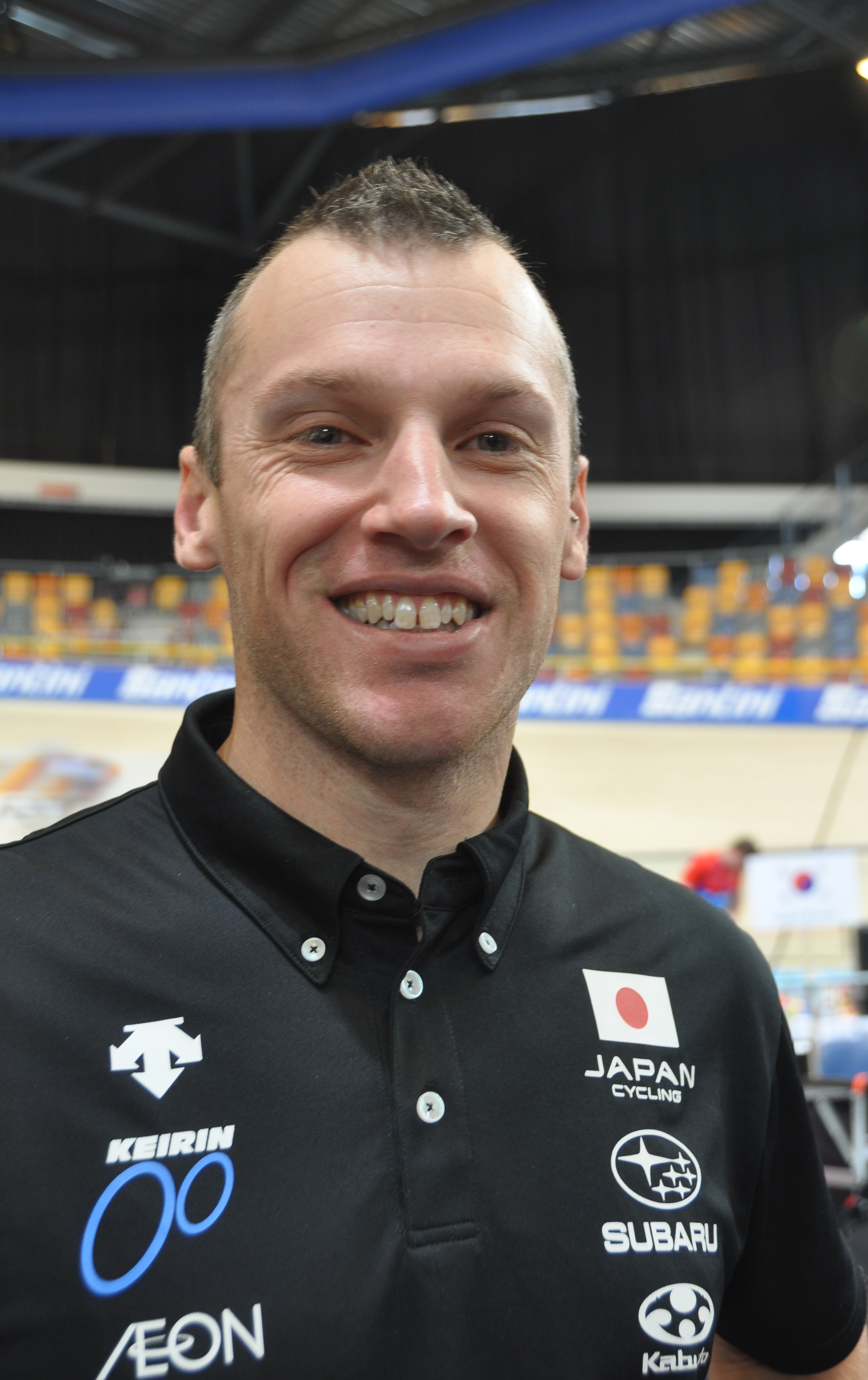

Personal information
- Full name: Jason Niblett
- Born: 18 February 1983 (age 43) Horsham, Victoria

Cycling career
- Sport: Cycling
- Discipline: Track
- Role: Rider, Pilot
- Rider type: Sprinter, Tandem Class Blind
Medal record
Men's track cycling
Representing Australia
World Championships
Bronze medal – third place	2011 Apeldoorn	Team sprint
Commonwealth Games
Gold medal – first place	2010 Delhi	Team sprint
Silver medal – second place	2014 Glasgow	Men's tandem 1 km time trial B
Silver medal – second place	2014 Glasgow	Men's tandem sprint B

Jason Niblett (born 18 February 1983 in Horsham, Victoria) is an Australian professional racing cyclist. He was an Australian Institute of Sport scholarship holder.

Niblett served as pilot to Kieran Modra at the 2014 Commonwealth Games in Glasgow, Scotland, where the pair won two silver medals in the Men's tandem sprint B and Men's tandem time trial. In November 2014, Niblett and Modra were awarded the South Australian Institute of Sport Male Athlete with a Disability of the Year award.

== Career highlights ==
2000
1st Team Sprint, World Championships – Juniors
2001
1st Team Sprint, World Championships – Juniors
2004
1st Team Sprint, Oceania Games, Melbourne
2005
1st Team Sprint, Australian National Track Championships, Adelaide
2006
2nd Sprint, Oceania Games, Melbourne
2nd Team Sprint, Oceania Games, Melbourne
2008
3rd Team Sprint, World Cup, Los Angeles
2010
1st Team Sprint, Commonwealth Games, Delhi
