= Holly Takos =

Australian cyclist

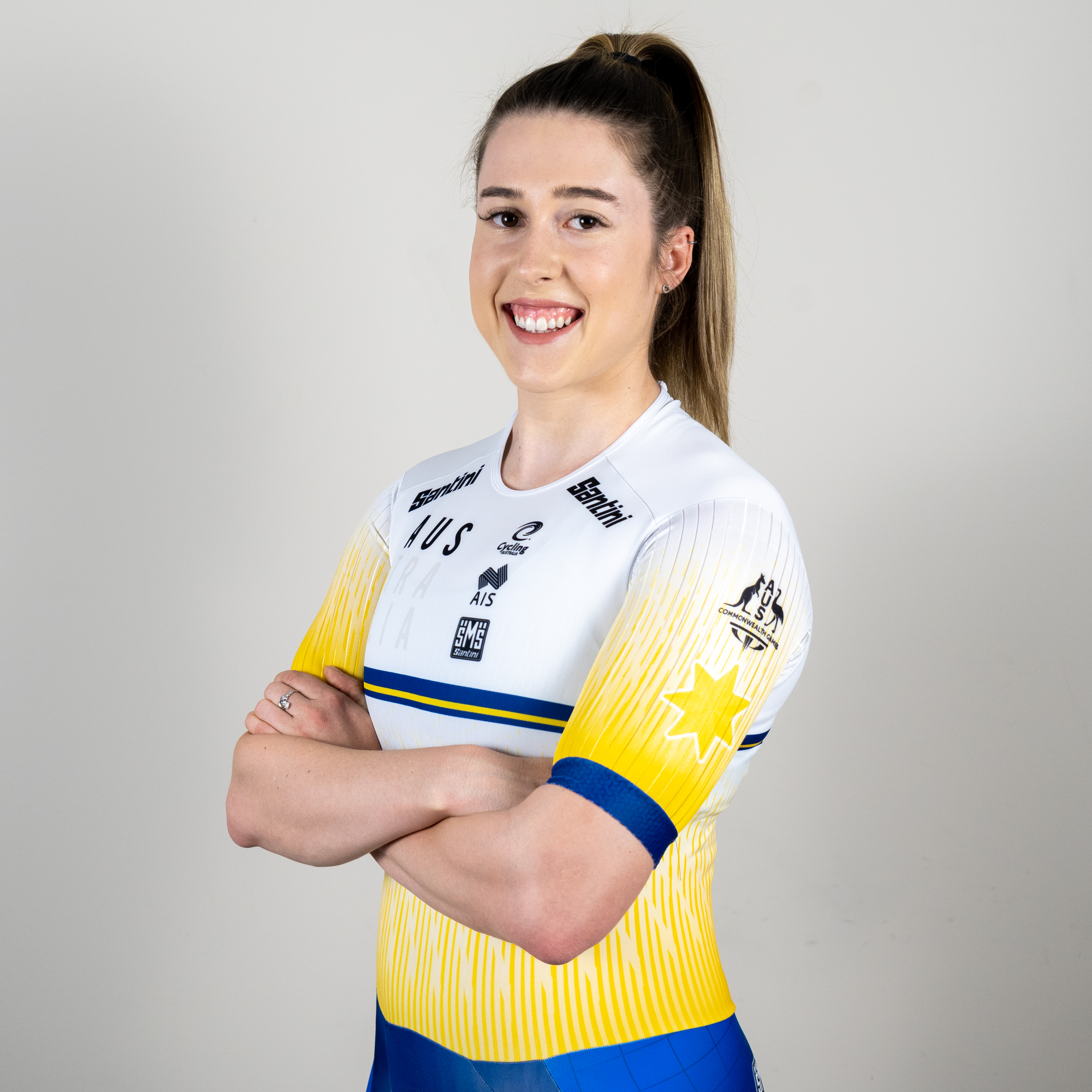

Personal information
- Born: 21 December 1995 (age 30)

Cycling career
- Sport: Cycling
- Discipline: Track cycling
- Rider type: Sprinter

Holly Takos (born 21 December 1995) is an Australian female Track Cyclist. She represents Australia at international competitions, including at the 2017 UCI Track Cycling World Championships.

== Career results ==
2016
1st Women's Keirin, Oceania Track Cycling Championships
1st Women's Team Sprint, Oceania Track Cycling Championships
4th Women's Sprint, Oceania Track Cycling Championships
4th Women's Team Sprint, UCI Track Cycling World Cup 1
5th Women's Sprint, UCI Track Cycling World Cup 1
2017
1st Women's Team Sprint, Australian National Track Cycling Championships
4th Women's Sprint, Australian National Track Cycling Championships
2018
1st Women's Team Sprint, Australian National Track Cycling Championships
