= Thomas Clarke (cyclist) =

Australian cyclist (born 1995)

Personal information
- Full name: Thomas Clarke
- Born: 6 April 1995 (age 31) Canberra, Australian Capital Territory, Australia

Cycling career
- Sport: Cycling
- Current team: Retired
- Discipline: Track
- Role: Rider
- Rider type: Sprinter, tandem pilot
Medal record
Track cycling
Representing Australia
Commonwealth Games
Bronze medal – third place	2014 Glasgow	Tandem sprint B (pilot)
Bronze medal – third place	2018 Gold Coast	Tandem 1 km time trial B (pilot)
Bronze medal – third place	2018 Gold Coast	Tandem sprint B (pilot)

Thomas Clarke (born 6 April 1995) is an Australian former track cyclist. He won three bronze medals as a sighted tandem pilot in para-cycling events at the 2014 and 2018 Commonwealth Games, and won the individual sprint and team sprint at the Hong Kong round of the 2018–19 UCI Track Cycling World Cup. He was the Australian national keirin champion in 2019.

== Early life ==
Clarke was born in Canberra and is a fourth-generation track cyclist; his father, grandfather and great-grandfather all raced on the track. He came through the ACT Academy of Sport before relocating to Adelaide in early 2015 to join the South Australian Sports Institute (SASI) cycling program under coach Jason Niblett. He rode for the Kilkenny Cycling Club and studied media and marketing at the University of Adelaide.

== Career ==
=== Tandem pilot ===
At the 2014 Commonwealth Games in Glasgow, Clarke piloted vision-impaired rider Paul Kennedy to a bronze medal in the men's tandem sprint B, one of the first para-cycling track events held at a Commonwealth Games.

Clarke later formed a tandem pairing with vision-impaired South Australian rider Brad Henderson. At the Australian Para-cycling Track National Championships in December 2017, the pair won both the tandem 1000 m time trial and the tandem sprint, securing selection consideration for the 2018 Commonwealth Games. At the 2018 UCI Para-cycling Track World Championships in Rio de Janeiro they placed fourth in the tandem 1 km time trial.

At the 2018 Commonwealth Games on the Gold Coast, Henderson and Clarke won bronze in the men's tandem 1000 m time trial B on the opening day of competition, Australia's first para-sport medal of the Games, in a personal best time of 1:01.512. The following day the pair added a second bronze medal in the men's tandem sprint B, defeating Malaysia in the bronze medal final.

=== Sprint ===
Alongside his piloting, Clarke competed as an individual sprinter. He was part of the Australian team at the Cali and Los Angeles rounds of the 2016–17 UCI Track Cycling World Cup, racing the sprint and keirin in Los Angeles on a borrowed bike after the team's equipment was delayed in transit from Colombia. He won the elite men's team sprint at the 2018 Australian National Track Championships with Patrick Constable and Matthew Glaetzer.

As a member of Cycling Australia's Podium Potential Academy, Clarke competed at UCI Track Cycling World Cup rounds in several countries. At the Cambridge round of the 2018–19 UCI Track Cycling World Cup in New Zealand he won team sprint silver with Nathan Hart and Jacob Schmid. The following week in Hong Kong he won gold in the individual sprint, defeating teammate James Brister in an all-Australian final, and a second gold in the team sprint with Matthew Richardson and Brister. Australia was crowned overall winner of the 2018–19 World Cup series following the Hong Kong round.

At the 2019 Australian National Track Championships, Clarke won the elite men's keirin title.

== Major results ==
2014
3rd, Tandem sprint B (pilot for Paul Kennedy), 2014 Commonwealth Games, Glasgow
2017
1st, Tandem 1000 m time trial and tandem sprint (pilot for Brad Henderson), Australian Para-cycling Track National Championships
2018
1st, Team sprint, Australian National Track Championships (with Patrick Constable and Matthew Glaetzer)
3rd, Tandem 1000 m time trial B (pilot for Brad Henderson), 2018 Commonwealth Games, Gold Coast
3rd, Tandem sprint B (pilot for Brad Henderson), 2018 Commonwealth Games, Gold Coast
4th, Tandem 1 km time trial, UCI Para-cycling Track World Championships, Rio de Janeiro
2019
1st, Sprint, UCI Track Cycling World Cup, Hong Kong
1st, Team sprint, UCI Track Cycling World Cup, Hong Kong (with Matthew Richardson and James Brister)
2nd, Team sprint, UCI Track Cycling World Cup, Cambridge (with Nathan Hart and Jacob Schmid)
1st, Keirin, Australian National Track Championships
