= Cycling at the 2014 Commonwealth Games – Men's road race =

Cycling – Men's road race at the 2014 Commonwealth Games
- Venue: Glasgow Green
- Dates: 3 August 2014
- Competitors: 149 from 37 nations

Medalists
| gold medal | Geraint Thomas | Wales |
| silver medal | Jack Bauer | New Zealand |
| bronze medal | Scott Thwaites | England |

The Men's road race at the 2014 Commonwealth Games, as part of the cycling programme, took place on 3 August 2014 over a distance of 168.2 km. The race was won by Geraint Thomas of Wales.

== Results ==
140 riders were on the start list but only 12 reached the finish line :

| Rank | Rider | Time |
|---|---|---|
| Gold medal | Geraint Thomas (WAL) | 4:13:05 |
| Silver medal | Jack Bauer (NZL) | +1:21 |
| Bronze medal | Scott Thwaites (ENG) | s.t. |
| 4 | Russell Downing (ENG) | +4:29 |
| 5 | Mark Renshaw (AUS) | s.t. |
| 6 | Luke Rowe (WAL) | +4:32 |
| 7 | Greg Henderson (NZL) | +5:15 |
| 8 | Peter Kennaugh (IOM) | s.t. |
| 9 | Dan Craven (NAM) | +9:03 |
| 10 | Scott Davies (WAL) | +10:10 |
| 11 | David Millar (SCO) | +10:21 |
| 12 | Caleb Ewan (AUS) | +11:22 |
| | Danny Lloyd Laud (ANG) | DNF |
| | Kris Pradel (ANG) | DNF |
| | Sherwin Osborne (ANG) | DNF |
| | Justin Hodge (ANG) | DNF |
| | Benjamin Phillip (ANG) | DNF |
| | Jyme Bridges (ANT) | DNF |
| | Marvin Spencer (ANT) | DNF |
| | Andre Simon (ANT) | DNF |
| | Simon Clarke (AUS) | DNF |
| | Nathan Haas (AUS) | DNF |
| | Michael Hepburn (AUS) | DNF |
| | Rohan Dennis (AUS) | DNF |
| | Chad Albury (BAH) | DNF |
| | Anthony Colebrook (BAH) | DNF |
| | Jay Major (BAH) | DNF |
| | D'Angelo Sturrup (BAH) | DNF |
| | Roy Colebrook Jr. (BAH) | DNF |
| | Jamol Eastmond (BAR) | DNF |
| | Jesse Kelly (BAR) | DNF |
| | Ron Vasquez (BIZ) | DNF |
| | Giovanni Lovell (BIZ) | DNF |
| | Gregory Lovell (BIZ) | DNF |
| | Joel Borland (BIZ) | DNF |
| | Dominique Mayho (BER) | DNF |
| | Muhammad I'maadi Abd Aziz (BRU) | DNF |
| | William Routley (CAN) | DNF |
| | Svein Tuft (CAN) | DNF |
| | Ed Veal (CAN) | DNF |
| | Nicholas Barton (CAN) | DNF |
| | Remi Pelletier (CAN) | DNF |
| | Zachary Bell (CAN) | DNF |
| | Michele Smith (CAY) | DNF |
| | Christos Loizou (CYP) | DNF |
| | Marios Athanasiadis (CYP) | DNF |
| | Thomas Moses (ENG) | DNF |
| | Paul Oldham (ENG) | DNF |
| | Alex Dowsett (ENG) | DNF |
| | Ian Stannard (ENG) | DNF |
| | Samuel Anim (GHA) | DNF |
| | Anthony Boayke Dankwa (GHA) | DNF |
| | Abdul Umar (GHA) | DNF |
| | Mohammed Osman (GHA) | DNF |
| | Tobyn Horton (GUE) | DNF |
| | James McLaughlin (GUE) | DNF |
| | Matt Osborn (GUE) | DNF |
| | Michael Serafin (GUE) | DNF |
| | Aaron Bailey (GUE) | DNF |
| | James Roe (GUE) | DNF |
| | Geron Williams (GUY) | DNF |
| | Marlon Williams (GUY) | DNF |
| | Alanzo Greaves (GUY) | DNF |
| | Raynauth Jeffrey (GUY) | DNF |
| | Scott Savory (GUY) | DNF |
| | Arvind Panwar (IND) | DNF |
| | Amit Kumar (IND) | DNF |
| | Sombir (IND) | DNF |
| | Suresh Bishnoi (IND) | DNF |
| | Manjeet Singh (IND) | DNF |
| | Shreedhar Savanur (IND) | DNF |
| | Jake Kelly (IOM) | DNF |
| | Mark Christian (IOM) | DNF |
| | Elliot Baxter (IOM) | DNF |
| | Andrew Roche (IOM) | DNF |
| | Joseph Kelly (IOM) | DNF |
| | Robert Barnes (JAM) | DNF |
| | Marloe Rodman (JAM) | DNF |
| | Oneil Samuels (JAM) | DNF |
| | Richard Tanguy (JER) | DNF |
| | Christian Spence (JER) | DNF |
| | Suleiman Waithuweka Kangangi (KEN) | DNF |
| | Paul Ngasike Agorir (KEN) | DNF |
| | John Njoroge Muya (KEN) | DNF |
| | David Njau (KEN) | DNF |
| | Antony Muite (KEN) | DNF |
| | Teboho Khantsi (LES) | DNF |
| | Pheteso Monese (LES) | DNF |
| | Missi Thomas Kathumba (MAW) | DNF |
| | Mataya Tsoyo (MAW) | DNF |
| | Muhammad Fauzan Ahmad Lutfi (MAS) | DNF |
| | Loh Sea Keong (MAS) | DNF |
| | Yannick Lincoln (MRI) | DNF |
| | Jordan Lebon (MRI) | DNF |
| | Sebastien Tyack (MRI) | DNF |
| | Mike Chong Chin (MRI) | DNF |
| | Till Drobisch (NAM) | DNF |
| | Gerhard Mans (NAM) | DNF |
| | Heiko Redecker (NAM) | DNF |
| | Costa Seibib (NAM) | DNF |
| | Loto Petrus (NAM) | DNF |
| | Thomas Scully (NZL) | DNF |
| | Shane Archbold (NZL) | DNF |
| | Jesse Sergent (NZL) | DNF |
| | Mike Northey (NZL) | DNF |
| | Sean Downey (NIR) | DNF |
| | Connor McConvey (NIR) | DNF |
| | Roger Robert Aiken (NIR) | DNF |
| | Peter Hawkins (NIR) | DNF |
| | Fraser Duncan (NIR) | DNF |
| | Philip Lavery (NIR) | DNF |
| | Janvier Hadi (RWA) | DNF |
| | Adrien Niyonshuti (RWA) | DNF |
| | Gasore Hategeka (RWA) | DNF |
| | Valens Ndayisenga (RWA) | DNF |
| | Jean Bosco Nsengimana (RWA) | DNF |
| | Bonaventure Uwizeyimana (RWA) | DNF |
| | Grant Ferguson (SCO) | DNF |
| | James McCallum (SCO) | DNF |
| | Andrew Fenn (SCO) | DNF |
| | Jack Pullar (SCO) | DNF |
| | Evan Oliphant (SCO) | DNF |
| | Antoine Arrisol (SEY) | DNF |
| | Edward Pothin (SEY) | DNF |
| | Chris Germain (SEY) | DNF |
| | Moses Sesay (SLE) | DNF |
| | Jeevan Jayasinghe (SRI) | DNF |
| | Buddhika Warnakulasooriya (SRI) | DNF |
| | Cameron Adams (SVG) | DNF |
| | Orano Andrews (SVG) | DNF |
| | Ara Monadjem (SWZ) | DNF |
| | Morgan Rudd (SWZ) | DNF |
| | Sebastian Kigongo Semakula (UGA) | DNF |
| | Leon Matovu (UGA) | DNF |
| | Richard Loning'o Laizer (TAN) | DNF |
| | Emmanuel Philimon Mollely (TAN) | DNF |
| | Owain Doull (WAL) | DNF |
| | Samuel Harrison (WAL) | DNF |
| | Jonathan Mould (WAL) | DNF |
| | Christopher Symonds (GHA) | DNS |
