= Cycling at the Island Games =

Cycling is an event at the Island Games, the biennial multi-sports event for island nations, territories and dependencies.

Cycling at the Island Games started in 1985, with women competing from 1997.

The minimum age for competitors is 17 in the year of the event. Each island can enter up to 5 male and 3 female competitors per event.

Recommended Programme:

- Time Trial
- Mountain Bike Criterium
- Road Race
- Mountain Bike Cross Country
- Road Criterium

Optional events may be possible.

== Events ==
Most cycling events are road cycling.

Event	I 1985	II 1987	III 1989	IV 1991	V 1993	VI 1995	VII 1997	VIII 1999	IX 2001	X 2003	XI 2005	XII 2007	XIII	XIV 2011	XV 2013	XVI 2015	XVII 2017	XVIII 2019	XIX 2023
Current events
Time trial							X	X		X	X	X		X	X	X	X	X	X
Town centre criterium	X	X	X	X	X	X	X	X	X	X	X	X		X	X	X	X	X	X
Road race	X	X	X	X	X	X	X	X	X	X	X	X		X	X	X	X	X	X
Mountain biking									X	X	X	X		X	X	X	X	X	X
Cross country									X	X	X	X		X	X	X	X		X

== Top Medalists ==
	Gold Medals		Total Medals	
	No:	Team	No:	Team
Men's Individual	20	Isle of Man	52	Isle of Man
Men's Team Events	20	Isle of Man	27	Isle of Man
Men's Mountain Bike	17	Isle of Man	29	Isle of Man
Women's Individual	9	Guernsey; Isle of Man	23	Isle of Man
Women's Team Events	7	Guernsey	20	Guernsey
Women's Mountain Bike	8	Western Isles	14	Western Isles

== Men's Individual ==
	Gold Medals		Total Medals	
	No:	Team	No:	Team
Men's Individual	20; 10	Isle of Man; Saaremaa	52; 20	Isle of Man; Saaremaa

=== Men's Time Trial ===
Year	Games	Host	Gold	Silver	Bronze
1997	VII	Jersey	Isle of Man	Shetland	Saaremaa
1999	VIII	Gotland	Isle of Man	Shetland	Saaremaa
2003	X	Guernsey	Andrew Roche; Isle of Man	Paul Brehaut; Guernsey	Elliot Baxter; Isle of Man
2005	XI	Shetland	Isle of Man	Shetland	Jersey
2007	XII	Rhodes	Isle of Man	Jersey	Bermuda
2011	XIV	Isle of Wight	Andrew Roche; Isle of Man	James McLaughlin; Guernsey	Nic Hutchings; Isle of Wight
2013	XV	Bermuda	Andrew Roche; Isle of Man	Torkil Veyhe; Faroe Islands	Shannon Lawrence; Bermuda
2015	XVI	Jersey	Torkil Veyhe; Faroe Islands	Edward Perry; Isle of Man	Nathan Draper; Isle of Man
2017	XVII	Gotland	Torkil Veyhe; Faroe Islands	Jack Rebours; Jersey	Daniel Halksworth; Jersey
2019	XVIII	Gibraltar	Mihkel Räim; Saaremaa	Sam Culverwell; Guernsey	Adam Scarffe; Isle of Man
2023	XIX	Guernsey	Kevin Chant; Isle of Wight	Sam Culverwell; Guernsey	John Pallot; Jersey

=== Men's Town Centre Criterium ===
Year	Games	Host			
Year	Games	Host	Gold	Silver	Bronze
1985	I	Isle of Man	Isle of Man	Isle of Man	Isle of Man
1987	II	Guernsey	Isle of Man	Jersey	Isle of Man
1989	III	Faroe Islands	Isle of Man	Isle of Man	Isle of Man
1991	IV	Åland	Saaremaa	Isle of Man	Guernsey
1993	V	Isle of Wight	Isle of Man	Isle of Wight	Isle of Man
1995	VI	Gibraltar	Saaremaa	Guernsey	Faroe Islands
1997	VII	Jersey	Saaremaa	Isle of Man	Faroe Islands
1999	VIII	Gotland	Saaremaa	Isle of Man	Saaremaa
2001	IX	Isle of Man	Isle of Man	Isle of Man	Faroe Islands
2003	X	Guernsey	Mark Cavendish; Isle of Man	Sam Firby; Jersey	Indrek Rannama; Saaremaa
2005	XI	Shetland	Isle of Man	Jersey	Saaremaa
2007	XII	Rhodes	Guernsey	Bermuda	Isle of Man
2011	XIV	Isle of Wight	Tobyn Horton; Guernsey	Greg Mansell; Jersey	Indrek Rannama; Saaremaa
2013	XV	Bermuda	Tobyn Horton; Guernsey	Richard Tanguy; Jersey	Gregg Mansell; Jersey
2015	XVI	Jersey	Dominique Mayho; Bermuda	Nathan Draper; Isle of Man	Leon Mazzone; Isle of Man
2017	XVII	Gotland	Karl Lauk; Saaremaa	Torkil Veyhe; Faroe Islands	Matthew Oliviera; Bermuda
2019	XVIII	Gibraltar	Sam Culverwell; Guernsey	Oskar Nisu; Saaremaa	Albert Barcelo; Menorca
2023	XIX	Guernsey	Sam Culverwell; Guernsey	Jörgen Matt; Saaremaa	John Pallot; Jersey

=== Men's Road Race ===
Year	Games	Host			
Year	Games	Host	Gold	Silver	Bronze
1985	I	Isle of Man	Isle of Man	Isle of Man	Isle of Man
1987	II	Guernsey	Isle of Man	Jersey	Isle of Man
1989	III	Faroe Islands	Isle of Man	Isle of Man	Isle of Man
1991	IV	Åland	Jersey	Isle of Man	Saaremaa
1993	V	Isle of Wight	Isle of Man	Isle of Wight	Jersey
1995	VI	Gibraltar	Saaremaa	Faroe Islands	Jersey
1997	VII	Jersey	Saaremaa	Isle of Man	Isle of Man
1999	VIII	Gotland	Saaremaa	Faroe Islands	Saaremaa
2001	IX	Isle of Man	Isle of Man	Jersey	Isle of Man
2003	X	Guernsey	Isle of Man	Isle of Man	Faroe Islands
2005	XI	Shetland	Bermuda	Isle of Man	Isle of Man
2007	XII	Rhodes	Saaremaa	Isle of Man	Bermuda
2011	XIV	Isle of Wight	Mihkel Räim; Saaremaa	James McLaughlin; Guernsey	Andrew Roche; Isle of Man
2013	XV	Bermuda	Tobyn Horton; Guernsey	Torkil Veyhe; Faroe Islands	Andrew Roche; Isle of Man
2015	XVI	Jersey	Mihkel Räim; Saaremaa	Nathan Draper; Isle of Man	Torkil Veyhe; Faroe Islands
2017	XVII	Gotland	Mihkel Räim; Saaremaa	Davur Magnussen; Faroe Islands	Karl Lauk; Saaremaa
2019	XVIII	Gibraltar	Mihkel Räim; Saaremaa	Nathan Draper; Isle of Man	Steven Kalf; Saaremaa
2023	XIX	Guernsey	Sam Culverwell; Guernsey	Karl Patrick Lauk; Saaremaa	Roberto Ledesma Estevez; Menorca

== Men's team ==
	Gold Medals		Total Medals	
	No:	Team	No:	Team
Men's Team Events	20; 7	Isle of Man; Saaremaa	27; 22	Isle of Man; Jersey

=== Men's Time Trial Team Event ===
Year	Games	Host			
Year	Games	Host	Gold	Silver	Bronze
1985	I	Isle of Man	Isle of Man	Isle of Wight	(Anglesey) Ynys Môn
1987	II	Guernsey	Isle of Man	Jersey	Guernsey
1989	III	Faroe Islands	Isle of Man	(Anglesey) Ynys Môn	Guernsey
1991	IV	Åland	Jersey	Saaremaa	Isle of Man
1993	V	Isle of Wight	Isle of Man	Jersey	Isle of Wight
1995	VI	Gibraltar	Jersey	Isle of Man	Faroe Islands
1997	VII	Jersey	Isle of Man	Guernsey	Jersey
1999	VIII	Gotland	Isle of Man	Guernsey	Jersey
2001	IX	Isle of Man	Isle of Man	Jersey	Shetland
2003	X	Guernsey	Isle of Man	Jersey	Guernsey
2005	XI	Shetland	Isle of Man	Jersey	Shetland
2007	XII	Rhodes	Isle of Man	Jersey	Bermuda
2011	XIV	Isle of Wight	Isle of Man	Guernsey	Isle of Wight
2013	XV	Bermuda	Isle of Man	Guernsey	Jersey
2015	XVI	Jersey	Isle of Man	Jersey	Faroe Islands
2017	XVII	Gotland	Jersey	Guernsey	Faroe Islands
2019	XVIII	Gibraltar	Isle of Man	Saaremaa	Guernsey
2023	XIX	Guernsey	Isle of Wight	Guernsey	Jersey

=== Men's Town Centre Criterium Team Event ===
Year	Games	Host			
Year	Games	Host	Gold	Silver	Bronze
2011	XIV	Isle of Wight	Isle of Man	Guernsey	Saaremaa
2015	XVI	Jersey	Isle of Man	Jersey	Saaremaa
2017	XVII	Gotland	Saaremaa	Bermuda	Isle of Man
2019	XVIII	Gibraltar	Saaremaa	Guernsey	Isle of Man
2023	XIX	Guernsey	Saaremaa	Isle of Man	Jersey

=== Men's Road Race Team Event ===
Year	Games	Host			
Year	Games	Host	Gold	Silver	Bronze
2003	X	Guernsey	Isle of Man	Jersey	Saaremaa
2005	XI	Shetland	Isle of Man	Bermuda	Jersey
2007	XII	Rhodes	Saaremaa	Faroe Islands	Jersey
2011	XIV	Isle of Wight	Isle of Man	Guernsey	Saaremaa
2013	XV	Bermuda	Guernsey	Isle of Man	Jersey
2015	XVI	Jersey	Isle of Man	Saaremaa	Jersey
2017	XVII	Gotland	Saaremaa	Isle of Man	Faroe Islands
2019	XVIII	Gibraltar	Saaremaa	Isle of Man	Jersey
2023	XIX	Guernsey	Saaremaa	Guernsey	Isle of Wight

== Men's Mountain Bike ==
	Gold Medals		Total Medals	
	No:	Team	No:	Team
Men's Mountain Bike	17; 7	Isle of Man; Guernsey	29; 28	Isle of Man; Guernsey

=== Men's Mountain Bike Cross Country ===
Year	Games	Host			
Year	Games	Host	Gold	Silver	Bronze
2001	IX	Isle of Man	Elliot Baxter; Isle of Man	Peter Kennaugh; Isle of Man	Andrew Scott; Prince Edward Island
2003	X	Guernsey	Elliot Baxter; Isle of Man	Nick Charlton Smith; Isle of Wight	Rob Smart; Guernsey
2005	XI	Shetland	Andy Roche; Isle of Man	Jimmy Carling; Guernsey	James Patterson; Jersey
2007	XII	Rhodes	Elliot Baxter; Isle of Man	not awarded	Robin Ovenden; Jersey
2011	XIV	Isle of Wight	Rob Smart; Guernsey	Elliot Baxter; Isle of Man	Diego Escudero Escriba; Menorca
2013	XV	Bermuda	El Hihioui Kamal; Menorca	Elliot Baxter; Isle of Man	Helgi Winther Olsen; Faroe Islands
2015	XVI	Jersey	Nicholas Corlett; Isle of Man	Kamal El Hihioui; Menorca	James Roe; Guernsey
2017	XVII	Gotland	James Roe; Guernsey	Nicholas Corlett; Isle of Man	Elliot Baxter; Isle of Man
2023	XVIII	Guernsey	Rhys Hydrio; Jersey	James Roe; Guernsey	Brad Vaudin; Guernsey

=== Men's Mountain Bike Cross Country Team Event ===
Year	Games	Host			
Year	Games	Host	Gold	Silver	Bronze
2001	IX	Isle of Man	Isle of Man	Guernsey	Saaremaa
2003	X	Guernsey	Guernsey	Isle of Wight	Isle of Man
2005	XI	Shetland	Isle of Man	Guernsey	Jersey
2007	XII	Rhodes	Isle of Man	Jersey	Guernsey
2011	XIV	Isle of Wight	Guernsey	Isle of Man	Menorca
2013	XV	Bermuda	Guernsey	Menorca	Isle of Man
2015	XVI	Jersey	Isle of Man	Jersey	Menorca
2017	XVII	Gotland	Isle of Man	Guernsey	Jersey
2023	XVIII	Guernsey	Jersey	Guernsey	Isle of Man

=== Men's Mountain Bike Criterium ===
Year	Games	Host			
Year	Games	Host	Gold	Silver	Bronze
2003	X	Guernsey	Elliott Baxter; Isle of Man	Nick Mann; Guernsey	Nick Charlton-Smith; Isle of Wight
2005	XI	Shetland	Andrew Roche; Isle of Man	Jimmy Carling; Guernsey	James Patterson; Jersey
2007	XII	Rhodes	Elliot Baxter; Isle of Man	Xavier Mercadel; Menorca	Robin Ovenden; Jersey
2011	XIV	Isle of Wight	Rob Smart; Guernsey	James Roe; Guernsey	Andrew Colver; Guernsey
2013	XV	Bermuda	El Hihioui Kamal; Menorca	Elliot Baxter; Isle of Man	Leon Mazzone; Isle of Man
2015	XVI	Jersey	Nicholas Corlett; Isle of Man	Rhys Hidrio; Jersey	James Roe; Guernsey
2017	XVII	Gotland	Nicholas Corlett; Isle of Man	James Roe; Guernsey	Sam Culverwell; Guernsey
2023	XVIII	Guernsey	Rhys Hydrio; Jersey	James Roe; Guernsey	Brad Vaudin; Guernsey

=== Men's Mountain Bike Criterium Team Event ===
Year	Games	Host			
Year	Games	Host	Gold	Silver	Bronze
2015	XVI	Jersey	Isle of Man	Jersey	Guernsey
2017	XVII	Gotland	Isle of Man	Guernsey	Jersey
2023	XVIII	Guernsey	Guernsey	Jersey	Isle of Man

== Women's Individual ==
	Gold Medals		Total Medals	
	No:	Team	No:	Team
Women's Individual	9	Guernsey; Isle of Man	23; 22	Isle of Man; Guernsey

=== Women's Time Trial ===
Year	Games	Host			
Year	Games	Host	Gold	Silver	Bronze
1997	VII	Jersey	Isle of Man	Jersey	Guernsey
1999	VIII	Gotland	Guernsey	Isle of Man	Jersey
2001	IX	Isle of Man	Guernsey	Rhodes	Isle of Man
2003	X	Guernsey	Ann Bowditch; Guernsey	Lynn Patchett; Bermuda	Julia Hawley; Bermuda
2005	XI	Shetland	Bermuda	Rhodes	Guernsey
2007	XII	Rhodes	Rhodes	Rhodes	Bermuda
2011	XIV	Isle of Wight	Christine Mclean; Shetland	Susan Townsend; Jersey	Karina Bowie; Guernsey
2013	XV	Bermuda	Ann Bowditch; Guernsey	Susan Townsend; Jersey	Súsanna Skylv Sørensen; Faroe Islands
2015	XVI	Jersey	Kimberley Ashton; Jersey	Elizabeth Holden; Isle of Man	Christine McLean; Shetland
2017	XVII	Gotland	Christine McLean; Shetland	Karina Bowie; Guernsey	Florence Cox; Jersey
2019	XVIII	Gibraltar	Becky Storrie; Isle of Man	Florence Cox; Jersey	Nuria Pico; Menorca
2023	XIX	Guernsey	Hannah Brehaut; Guernsey	Flo Thomas; Jersey	Gwenno Hughes; Ynys Môn

=== Women's Town Centre Criterium ===
Year	Games	Host			
Year	Games	Host	Gold	Silver	Bronze
1999	VIII	Gotland	Isle of Man	Guernsey	Isle of Man
2001	IX	Isle of Man	Isle of Man	Guernsey	Rhodes
2003	X	Guernsey	Guernsey	Isle of Man	Isle of Man
2005	XI	Shetland	Bermuda	Isle of Man	Guernsey
2007	XII	Rhodes	Rhodes	Rhodes	Rhodes
2011	XIV	Isle of Wight	Ann Bowditch; Guernsey	Laura Wasley; Isle of Man	Kim Ashton; Jersey
2013	XV	Bermuda	Ann Bowditch; Guernsey	Karen Bordage; Bermuda	Kerry MacPhee; Western Isles
2015	XVI	Jersey	Kimberley Ashton; Jersey	Elizabeth Holden; Isle of Man	Clare Treharne; Jersey
2017	XVII	Gotland	Zandra Larsson; Gotland	Zoenique Williams; Bermuda	Florence Cox; Jersey
2019	XVIII	Gibraltar	Tara Ferguson; Isle of Man	Rebecca Catley; Jersey	Ellen Barker; Isle of Man
2023	XIX	Guernsey	Olivia Lett; Gibraltar	Flo Thomas; Jersey	Elaine Pratts; Gibraltar

=== Women's Road Race ===
Year	Games	Host			
Year	Games	Host	Gold	Silver	Bronze
1999	VIII	Gotland	Isle of Man	Jersey	Guernsey
2001	IX	Isle of Man	Isle of Man	Guernsey	Isle of Man
2003	X	Guernsey	Bermuda	Bermuda	Guernsey
2005	XI	Shetland	Isle of Man	Isle of Man	Bermuda
2007	XII	Rhodes	Rhodes	Bermuda	Rhodes
2011	XIV	Isle of Wight	Kim Ashton; Jersey	Ruth Moll; Menorca	Ann Bowditch; Guernsey
2013	XV	Bermuda	Nicole Mitchell; Bermuda	Karen Bordage; Bermuda	Ann Bowditch; Guernsey
2015	XVI	Jersey	Kimberley Ashton; Jersey	Elizabeth Holden; Isle of Man	Gabriella Arnold; Bermuda
2017	XVII	Gotland	Tara Ferguson; Isle of Man	Zoenique Williams; Bermuda	Nicole Mitchell; Bermuda
2019	XVIII	Gibraltar	Florence Cox; Jersey	Ellen Barker; Isle of Man	Rebecca Catley; Jersey
2023	XIX	Guernsey	Jamie-Lee Wright; Guernsey	Hannah Brehaut; Guernsey	Flo Thomas; Jersey

== Women's team ==
	Gold Medals		Total Medals	
	No:	Team	No:	Team
Women's Team Events	7; 5; 5; 5	Guernsey; Jersey; Bermuda; Isle of Man	20; 17	Guernsey; Isle of Man

=== Women's Time Trial Team Event ===
Year	Games	Host			
Year	Games	Host	Gold	Silver	Bronze
1999	VIII	Gotland	Guernsey	Isle of Man	not awarded
2001	IX	Isle of Man	Isle of Man	Guernsey	Rhodes
2003	X	Guernsey	Bermuda	Guernsey	Isle of Man
2005	XI	Shetland	Bermuda	Isle of Man	Guernsey
2007	XII	Rhodes	Rhodes	Bermuda	Isle of Man
2011	XIV	Isle of Wight	Guernsey	Jersey	Isle of Man
2013	XV	Bermuda	Guernsey	Jersey	Western Isles
2015	XVI	Jersey	Jersey	Shetland	Guernsey
2017	XVII	Gotland	Guernsey	Jersey	Isle of Man
2019	XVIII	Gibraltar	Isle of Man	Jersey	Guernsey
2023	XIX	Guernsey	Guernsey	Gibraltar	not awarded

=== Women's Town Centre Criterium Team Event ===
Year	Games	Host			
Year	Games	Host	Gold	Silver	Bronze
2011	XIV	Isle of Wight	Guernsey	Isle of Man	Jersey
2015	XVI	Jersey	Jersey	Guernsey	Bermuda
2017	XVII	Gotland	Bermuda	Isle of Man	Jersey
2019	XVIII	Gibraltar	Isle of Man	Jersey	Guernsey
2023	XIX	Guernsey	Gibraltar	not awarded	not awarded

=== Women's Road Race Team Event ===
Year	Games	Host			
Year	Games	Host	Gold	Silver	Bronze
2003	X	Guernsey	Bermuda	Isle of Man	Guernsey
2005	XI	Shetland	Isle of Man	Bermuda	Jersey
2007	XII	Rhodes	Rhodes	Isle of Man	Bermuda
2011	XIV	Isle of Wight	Jersey	Guernsey	Isle of Man
2013	XV	Bermuda	Bermuda	Guernsey	Jersey
2015	XVI	Jersey	Jersey	Bermuda	Guernsey
2017	XVII	Gotland	Isle of Man	Bermuda	Guernsey
2019	XVIII	Gibraltar	Jersey	Isle of Man	Guernsey
2023	XIX	Guernsey	Guernsey	Jersey	Gibraltar

== Women's Mountain Bike ==
	Gold Medals		Total Medals	
	No:	Team	No:	Team
Women's Mountain Bike	8; 5	Western Isles; Guernsey	14; 12	Western Isles; Guernsey

=== Women's Mountain Bike Cross Country ===
Year	Games	Host			
Year	Games	Host	Gold	Silver	Bronze
2003	X	Guernsey	Guernsey	Isle of Man	
2007	XII	Rhodes	Guernsey		
2011	XIV	Isle of Wight	Ruth Moll; Menorca	Jacqui Fletcher; Isle of Man	Ann Bowditch; Guernsey
2015	XVI	Jersey	Kerry Macphee; Western Isles	Kirsty Macphee; Western Isles	Helene Monpetit; Jersey
2017	XVII	Gotland	Kerry Macphee; Western Isles	Kirsty Macphee; Western Isles	Nuria Pico; Menorca
2023	XIX	Guernsey	Núria Bosch Picó; Menorca	Kerry MacPhee; Western Isles	Emily Bridson; Jersey

=== Women's Mountain Bike Cross Country Team Event ===
Year	Games	Host			
Year	Games	Host	Gold	Silver	Bronze
2011	XIV	Isle of Wight	Isle of Man	Guernsey	
2015	XVI	Jersey	Western Isles	Jersey	Guernsey
2017	XVII	Gotland	Western Isles	Isle of Man	Jersey
2023	XIX	Guernsey	Guernsey	Isle of Man	not awarded

=== Women's Mountain Bike Criterium ===
Year	Games	Host			
Year	Games	Host	Gold	Silver	Bronze
2003	X	Guernsey	Guernsey	Isle of Man	
2007	XII	Rhodes	Guernsey		
2011	XIV	Isle of Wight	Ruth Moll; Menorca	Ann Bowditch; Guernsey	Jacqui Fletcher; Isle of Man
2015	XVI	Jersey	Kerry Macphee; Western Isles	Kirsty Macphee; Western Isles	Megan Dowinton; Guernsey
2017	XVII	Gotland	Kerry Macphee; Western Isles	Kirsty Macphee; Western Isles	Nuria Pico; Menorca
2023	XIX	Guernsey	Núria Bosch Picó; Menorca	Kerry MacPhee; Western Isles	Kirree Quayle; Isle of Man

=== Women's Mountain Bike Criterium Team Event ===
Year	Games	Host			
Year	Games	Host	Gold	Silver	Bronze
2015	XVI	Jersey	Western Isles	Jersey	Guernsey
2017	XVII	Gotland	Western Isles	Isle of Man	Jersey
2023	XIX	Guernsey	Isle of Man	Guernsey	not awarded
