= Cycling at the 2011 Island Games =

Cycling at the 2011 Island Games was held from 26 June–1 July 2011 at the Military Road, VentnorTown and Cheverton Farm.

== Events ==
=== Medal table ===
Rank	Nation	Gold	Silver	Bronze	Total
1	Guernsey (GGY)	7	9	4	20
2	Isle of Man (IOM)	5	5	4	14
3	Jersey (JEY)	2	3	2	7
4	Menorca	2	1	2	5
5	Saare County	1	0	3	4
6	Shetland (SHE)	1	0	0	1
7	Isle of Wight (IOW)	0	0	2	2
Totals (7 entries)		18	18	17	53

=== Men ===
Event	Gold		Silver		Bronze	
Road Race	Mihkel Räim (Saaremaa)	3:05:14	James McLaughlin (GGY)	s.t.	Andrew Roche (IOM)	3:05:19
Road Race Team	Isle of Man		Guernsey		Saare County	
Time Trial	Andrew Roche (IOM)	58:21	James McLaughlin (GGY)	58:47	Nic Hutchings (Isle of Wight)	1:00:01
Time Trial Team	Isle of Man		Guernsey		Isle of Wight	
Criterion	Tobyn Horton (GGY)	1:04:47	Greg Mansell (Jersey)	1:04:51	Indrek Rannama (Saaremaa)	s.t.
Cross Country	Rob Smart (GGY)	01:19:20	Elliot Baxter (IOM)	+2:10	Diego Escudero Escriba (Menorca)	+3:47
Cross Country Team	Guernsey		Isle of Man		Menorca	
MTB Criterium	Rob Smart (GGY)		James Roe (GGY)		Andrew Colver (GGY)	
MTB Criterium Team	Isle of Man		Guernsey		Saare County	

=== Women ===
Event	Gold		Silver		Bronze	
Road Race	Kim Ashton (Jersey)	2:10:58	Ruth Moll (Menorca)	2:11:02	Ann Bowditch (GGY)	s.t.
Road Race Team	Jersey		Guernsey		Isle of Man	
Time Trial	Christine Mclean (Shetland Islands)	47:40	Sue Townsend (Jersey)	47:46	Karina Bowie (GGY)	48:10
Time Trial Team	Guernsey		Jersey		Isle of Man	
Criterion	Ann Bowditch (GGY)	39:41	Laura Wasley (IOM)	s.t.	Kim Ashton (Jersey)	s.t.
Cross Country	Ruth Moll (GGY)	57:39	Jacqui Fletcher (Menorca)	+3:01	Ann Bowditch (GGY)	+4:10
Cross Country Team	Isle of Man		Guernsey			
MTB Criterium	Ruth Moll (Menorca)		Ann Bowditch (GGY)		Jacqui Fletcher (IOM)	
MTB Criterium Team	Guernsey		Isle of Man		Jersey	
