= Cycling at the 2014 Commonwealth Games – Women's road time trial =

Cycling – Women's road time trial at the 2014 Commonwealth Games
- Venue: Glasgow Green
- Dates: 31 July 2014
- Competitors: 32 from 17 nations
- Winning time: 42:25.46

Medalists
gold medal	Linda Villumsen	New Zealand
silver medal	Emma Pooley	England
bronze medal	Katrin Garfoot	Australia

The Women's road time trial at the 2014 Commonwealth Games, as part of the cycling programme, was held on 31 July 2014.

== Route ==
The 29.6 km (18.4 mi) event started at Glasgow Green at 10am, with each of the riders beginning by heading east to Dennistoun and Haghill. The route continued north-east through Riddrie to the main circuit. The riders turned west and then north towards Barmulloch and Robroyston, before heading east through Auchinloch and on to Chryston. The route then headed south to Muirhead and turned west through Stepps and Millerston, back towards the finish at Glasgow Green.

== Results ==
Rank	Rider	Time
1st place, gold medalist(s)	Linda Villumsen (NZL)	42:25.46
2nd place, silver medalist(s)	Emma Pooley (ENG)	42:31.49
3rd place, bronze medalist(s)	Katrin Garfoot (AUS)	43:13.91
4	Jaime Nielsen (NZL)	43:29.85
5	Katie Archibald (SCO)	43:30.01
6	Shara Gillow (AUS)	43:33.70
7	Elinor Barker (WAL)	43:56.44
8	Lucy Coldwell (SCO)	44:03.40
9	Anna Turvey (SCO)	44:08.62
10	Jasmin Glaesser (CAN)	44:12.64
11	Reta Trotman (NZL)	44:30.12
12	Amy Roberts (WAL)	44:30.63
13	Joanna Rowsell (ENG)	44:45.87
14	Anna Christian (IOM)	45:48.65
15	Ashleigh Moolman (RSA)	45:58.07
16	Laura Brown (CAN)	46:35.77
17	Antri Christoforou (CYP)	46:53.93
18	Tamiko Butler (ANT)	47:17.99
19	Aurelie Halbwach (MRI)	47:25.71
20	Heidi Dalton (RSA)	48:22.03
21	Nicole Mitchell (BER)	48:33.06
22	Joanna Watts (GUE)	48:49.15
23	Ann Bowditch (GUE)	49:02.97
24	Leah Kirchmann (CAN)	49:05.24
25	Karina Bowie (GUE)	49:46.64
26	Laura Wasley (IOM)	50:07.14
27	Vera Adrian (NAM)	50:21.56
28	Irene Steyn (NAM)	51:16.04
29	Claire Fraser-Green (GUY)	53:02.61
30	Sriyalatha Wickramasingha (SRI)	54:33.67
31	Bianca Hernould (JAM)	55:32.10
	Ciara Horne (WAL)	DNS
