= Cycling at the 2014 Commonwealth Games – Women's road race =

Cycling – Women's road race at the 2014 Commonwealth Games
- Venue: Glasgow Green
- Dates: 3 August 2014
- Competitors: 62 from 20 nations

Medalists
gold medal	Lizzie Armitstead	England
silver medal	Emma Pooley	England
bronze medal	Ashleigh Moolman	South Africa

The Women's road race at the 2014 Commonwealth Games, as part of the cycling programme, was held on 3 August 2014.

== Results ==
Rank	Bib	Rider	Time
1st place, gold medalist(s)	14	Lizzie Armitstead (ENG)	2:38:43
2nd place, silver medalist(s)	18	Emma Pooley (ENG)	2:39:08
3rd place, bronze medalist(s)	45	Ashleigh Pasio (RSA)	2:39:54
4	2	Tiffany Cromwell (AUS)	2:39:54
5	42	Linda Villumsen (NZL)	2:39:57
6	3	Gracie Elvin (AUS)	2:41:02
7	49	Katie Archibald (SCO)	2:41:02
8	11	Leah Kirchmann (CAN)	2:44:12
9	39	Joanne Kiesanowski (NZL)	2:44:12
10	7	Melissa Hoskins (AUS)	2:44:12
11	17	Dani King (ENG)	2:44:12
12	15	Hannah Barnes (ENG)	2:44:12
13	63	Amy Roberts (WAL)	2:44:12
14	37	Rushlee Buchanan (NZL)	2:44:12
15	41	Reta Trotman (NZL)	2:44:12
16	40	Jaime Nielsen (NZL)	2:44:12
17	5	Shara Gillow (AUS)	2:44:12
18	25	Anna Christian (IOM)	2:44:12
19	16	Lucy Garner (ENG)	2:44:12
20	19	Laura Trott (ENG)	2:44:12
21	35	Lydia Helene Boylan (NIR)	2:50:55
22	46	An-Li Kachelhoffer (RSA)	2:51:00
23	52	Gemma Neill (SCO)	2:51:00
24	1	Tamiko Butler (ANT)	2:51:00
25	10	Jasmin Glaesser (CAN)	2:51:00
26	6	Chloe Hosking (AUS)	2:51:00
27	50	Anne Ewing (SCO)	2:51:00
	4	Katrin Garfoot (AUS)	DNF
	8	Nicole Mitchell (BER)	DNF
	9	Laura Brown (CAN)	DNF
	12	Stephanie Roorda (CAN)	DNF
	13	Antri Christoforou (CYP)	DNF
	20	Marina Bleasdale (GUE)	DNF
	21	Ann Bowditch (GUE)	DNF
	22	Karina Bowie (GUE)	DNF
	23	Joanna Watts (GUE)	DNF
	24	Claire Fraser-Green (GUY)	DNF
	26	Laura Wasley (IOM)	DNF
	27	Bianca Hernould (JAM)	DNF
	28	Doreen Musoliza Lwimbuli (KEN)	DNF
	29	Joyce Nyaruri Matara (KEN)	DNF
	30	Jane Njeri Mwangi (KEN)	DNF
	31	Joyce Muthoni Mwangi (KEN)	DNF
	32	Aurelie Halbwach (MRI)	DNF
	33	Vera Adrian (NAM)	DNF
	34	Irene Steyn (NAM)	DNF
	36	Claire Oakley (NIR)	DNF
	43	Heidi Dalton (RSA)	DNF
	44	Lise Olivier (RSA)	DNF
	47	Anriette Schoeman (RSA)	DNF
	48	Cherise Stander (RSA)	DNF
	51	Charline Joiner (SCO)	DNF
	53	Eileen Roe (SCO)	DNF
	54	Claire Thomas (SCO)	DNF
	55	Dinesha Adikari Mudiyanselage (SRI)	DNF
	56	Sriyalatha Wickramasingha (SRI)	DNF
	57	Carol Du-Pont (SWZ)	DNF
	58	Linda Loffler (SWZ)	DNF
	59	Dinize Wilsch (SWZ)	DNF
	60	Elinor Barker (WAL)	DNF
	61	Katie Curtis (WAL)	DNF
	62	Hayley Jones (WAL)	DNF
	38	Emily Collins (NZL)	DSQ
