= Cycling at the 2014 Commonwealth Games – Men's road time trial =

Cycling – Men's road time trial at the 2014 Commonwealth Games
- Venue: Glasgow Green
- Dates: 31 July 2014
- Competitors: 60 from 28 nations
- Winning time: 47:41.78

Medalists
| gold medal | Alex Dowsett | England |
| silver medal | Rohan Dennis | Australia |
| bronze medal | Geraint Thomas | Wales |

The Men's road time trial at the 2014 Commonwealth Games, as part of the cycling programme, was held on 31 July 2014.

== Route ==
The 40 km (25 mi) event started at Glasgow Green at 12:30pm, with each of the riders beginning by heading east to Dennistoun and Haghill. The route continued north-east through Riddrie to the main circuit. The riders turned west and then north towards Barmulloch and Robroyston, before heading east through Auchinloch and on to Chryston and Moodiesburn. The route then headed south to the outskirt of Glenboig and then began to return west, passing through Muirhead, Stepps and Millerston, back towards the finish at Glasgow Green.

== Results ==
| Rank | Rider | Time |
|---|---|---|
| 1st place, gold medalist(s) | Alex Dowsett (ENG) | 47:41.78 |
| 2nd place, silver medalist(s) | Rohan Dennis (AUS) | 47:51.08 |
| 3rd place, bronze medalist(s) | Geraint Thomas (WAL) | 47:55.82 |
| 4 | Svein Tuft (CAN) | 48:33.24 |
| 5 | Jesse Sergent (NZL) | 48:33.73 |
| 6 | Michael Hepburn (AUS) | 49:10.83 |
| 7 | Steve Cummings (ENG) | 49:14.86 |
| 8 | David Millar (SCO) | 49:56.23 |
| 9 | Luke Durbridge (AUS) | 49:57.73 |
| 10 | James McLaughlin (GUE) | 50:39.64 |
| 11 | Mark Christian (IOM) | 50:50.54 |
| 12 | Michael Hutchinson (NIR) | 52:05.64 |
| 13 | Marcus Christie (NIR) | 52:12.68 |
| 14 | Zachary Bell (CAN) | 52:15.38 |
| 15 | Andrew Roche (IOM) | 52:33.61 |
| 16 | Scott Davies (WAL) | 52:33.90 |
| 17 | Luke Rowe (WAL) | 52:47.97 |
| 18 | Till Drobisch (NAM) | 54:20.04 |
| 19 | Janvier Hadi (RWA) | 54:44.18 |
| 20 | Muhammad Fauzan Ahmad Lutfi (MAS) | 54:55.64 |
| 21 | Yannick Lincoln (MRI) | 55:08.31 |
| 22 | Aaron Bailey (GUE) | 55:52.17 |
| 23 | Valens Ndayisenga (RWA) | 56:38.87 |
| 24 | Gerhard Mans (NAM) | 56:47.02 |
| 25 | John Muya (KEN) | 56:47.69 |
| 26 | Dominique Mayho (BER) | 56:54.73 |
| 27 | David Njau (KEN) | 57:10.11 |
| 28 | Arvind Panwar (IND) | 57:21.52 |
| 29 | Giovanni Lovell (BIZ) | 58:21.13 |
| 30 | Raynauth Jeffrey (GUY) | 58:27.76 |
| 31 | Christian Spence (JER) | 58:29.27 |
| 32 | Matt Osborn (GUE) | 58:40.72 |
| 33 | Lee Calderon (GIB) | 58:48.36 |
| 34 | Andre Simon (ANT) | 58:49.06 |
| 35 | Julian Bellido (GIB) | 58:49.28 |
| 36 | Michele Smith (ANG) | 58:49.64 |
| 37 | Sombir (IND) | 59:10.76 |
| 38 | Marlon Williams (GUY) | 59:19.27 |
| 39 | Mike Chong Chin (MRI) | 59:23.11 |
| 40 | Danny Laud (ANG) | 59:50.44 |
| 41 | Joel Borland (BIZ) | 59:58.98 |
| 42 | Buddhika Warnakulasooriya (SRI) | 1:00:02.52 |
| 43 | Mark Francis (GIB) | 1:00:07.38 |
| 44 | Samuel Anim (GHA) | 1:00:48.00 |
| 45 | Antoine Arrisol (SEY) | 1:01:09.58 |
| 46 | Christopher Symonds (GHA) | 1:01:12.56 |
| 47 | Jyme Bridges (ANT) | 1:01:15.52 |
| 48 | Edward Pothin (SEY) | 1:01:27.19 |
| 49 | Marvin Spencer (ANT) | 1:01:15.52 |
| 50 | Chad Albury (BAH) | 1:02:42.43 |
| 51 | Kris Pradel (ANG) | 1:03:19.89 |
| 52 | Sherwin Osborne (ANG) | 1:03:34.60 |
| 53 | Mataya Tsoyo (MAW) | 1:05:07.13 |
| 54 | Missi Kathumba (MAW) | 1:05:35.36 |
| 55 | Jay Major (BAH) | 1:06:21.32 |
| 56 | Moses Sesay (SLE) | 1:11:00.11 |
| − | Suleiman Kangangi (KEN) | DNF |
| − | Joseph Kelly (IOM) | DNS |
| − | Richard Tanguy (JER) | DNS |
| − | Adrien Niyonshuti (RWA) | DNS |
