= Guernsey at the 2014 Commonwealth Games =

- CG code: GGY
- CGA: Guernsey Commonwealth Games Association
- Website: guernseycga.org.gg

in Glasgow, Scotland
- Flag bearer: Chris Simpson
- Medals: Gold 0 Silver 0 Bronze 0 Total 0

Commonwealth Games appearances (overview)
- 1970; 1974; 1978; 1982; 1986; 1990; 1994; 1998; 2002; 2006; 2010; 2014; 2018; 2022; 2026; 2030

Guernsey competed in the 2014 Commonwealth Games in Glasgow, Scotland from 23 July to 3 August 2014.

== Athletics ==
Men

Athlete	Event	Round 1		Semifinal		Final	
Athlete	Event	Result	Rank	Result	Rank	Result	Rank
Tom Druce	200 m	Did not start		Did not advance			
Tom Druce	400 m	49.62	4	Did not advance			

Women

Athlete	Event	Round 1		Semifinal		Final	
Athlete	Event	Result	Rank	Result	Rank	Result	Rank
Sarah Mercier	1500 metres	4:24.05 NR	8	—N/a		Did not advance	
Sarah Mercier	5000 metres	—N/a				16:31.05 NR	15
Kylie Robilliard	100 metres hurdles	14.20	6	—N/a		Did not advance	

== Badminton ==
Mixed team

Pool C

Pos	Team	Pld	W	L	GF	GA	GD	PF	PA	PD	Pts	Qualification
1	Scotland	3	3	0	30	0	+30	636	283	+353	3	Quarterfinals
2	New Zealand	3	2	1	20	10	+10	562	408	+154	2	
3	Guernsey	3	1	2	7	26	−19	409	666	−257	1	
4	Seychelles	3	0	3	6	27	−21	410	660	−250	0	

Source: glasgow2014.com

New Zealand
5
Commonwealth Arena, Glasgow
24 July

Guernsey
0

			1	2	3
1	(New Zealand) (Guernsey)	Oliver Leydon-Davis / Susannah Leydon-Davis; Daniel Penney / Gayle Lloyd	21; 9	21; 14
2	(New Zealand) (Guernsey)	Joe Wu; Stuart Hardy	21; 6	21; 8
3	(New Zealand) (Guernsey)	Michelle Chan; Elena Johnson	21; 12	21; 9
4	(New Zealand) (Guernsey)	Kevin Dennerly-Minturn / Oliver Leydon-Davis; Stuart Hardy / Daniel Penney	21; 10	21; 12
5	(New Zealand) (Guernsey)	Michelle Chan / Madeleine Stapleton; Elena Johnson / Gayle Lloyd	21; 16	21; 13

Scotland
5
Commonwealth Arena, Glasgow
24 July

Guernsey
0

			1	2	3
1	(Scotland) (Guernsey)	Martin Campbell / Jillie Cooper; Stuart Hardy / Gayle Lloyd	21; 7	21; 7
2	(Scotland) (Guernsey)	Kieran Merrilees; Daniel Penney	21; 7	21; 4
3	(Scotland) (Guernsey)	Kirsty Gilmour; Elena Johnson	21; 4	21; 7
4	(Scotland) (Guernsey)	Robert Blair / Paul van Rietvelde; Daniel Penney / Stuart Hardy	21; 3	21; 7
5	(Scotland) (Guernsey)	Jillie Cooper / Rebekka Findlay; Elena Johnson / Gayle Lloyd	21; 8	21; 7

Guernsey
3
Commonwealth Arena, Glasgow
25 July

Seychelles
2

			1	2	3
1	(Guernsey) (Seychelles)	Stuart Hardy / Gayle Lloyd; Georgie Cupidon / Juliette Ah-Wan	23; 21	11; 21	11; 21
2	(Guernsey) (Seychelles)	Daniel Penney; Kervin Ghislain	21; 16	22; 24	21; 17
3	(Guernsey) (Seychelles)	Elena Johnson; Allisen Camille	21; 14	21; 13
4	(Guernsey) (Seychelles)	Daniel Penney / Stuart Hardy; Georgie Cupidon / Steve Malcouzanne	16; 21	14; 21
5	(Guernsey) (Seychelles)	Elena Johnson / Gayle Lloyd; Juliette Ah-Wan / Allisen Camille	21; 17	16; 21	21; 19

== Cycling ==
=== Mountain biking ===
Athlete	Event	Time	Rank
James Roe	Men's cross-country	1:50:46	14
Michael Serafin	Men's cross-country	LAP	25

=== Road ===
Men

Athlete	Event	Time	Rank
James McLaughlin	Time trial	50:39.64	10

Women

Athlete	Event	Time	Rank
Marina Bleasdale	Road race	DNF	
Ann Bowditch	Road race	DNF	
Ann Bowditch	Time trial	49:02.97	23
Karina Bowie	Road race	DNF	
Karina Bowie	Time trial	49:46.64	25
Joanna Watts	Road race	DNF	
Joanna Watts	Time trial	48:49.15	22

== Judo ==
Men

Athlete	Event	Round of 32	Round of 16	Quarterfinals	Semifinals	Repechage	Final / BM	
Athlete	Event	Opposition Result	Opposition Result	Opposition Result	Opposition Result	Opposition Result	Opposition Result	Rank
Louis Plevin	−90 kg	Piontek (RSA); L 0000–1010	Did not advance					

== Shooting ==
Men

Athlete	Event	Stage 1	Stage 2	Stage 3	Total	
Athlete	Event	Points	Points	Points	Points	Rank
Nick Mace	Queen's prize individual	104-10v	147-15v	139-3v	390-28v	8
Peter Jory	Queen's prize individual	100-8v	147-9v	131-11v	378-28v	19
Peter Jory; Nick Mace	Queen's prize pairs	293-32v	281-16v	—N/a	574-48v	11

Women

Athlete	Event	Qualification		Final	
Athlete	Event	Points	Rank	Points	Rank
Tara Laine	10 metre air pistol	367	16	Did not advance	
Nikki Trebert	10 metre air pistol	51	23	Did not advance	
Tara Laine	25 m pistol	538	18	Did not advance	
Nikki Trebert	25 m pistol	536	19	Did not advance	

== Swimming ==
Men

Athlete	Event	Heat		Semifinal		Final	
Athlete	Event	Time	Rank	Time	Rank	Time	Rank
Miles Munro	50 m freestyle	22.94	13 Q	22.82	12	Did not advance	
Miles Munro	100 m freestyle	52.06	25	Did not advance			
Xander Beaton	50 m backstroke	28.86	26	Did not advance			
James Jurkiewicz	50 m backstroke	27.89	22	Did not advance			
James Jurkiewicz	100 m backstroke	1:00.29	24	Did not advance			
James Jurkiewicz	200 m backstroke	2:11.61	14	—N/a		Did not advance	
Luke Belton	50 m breaststroke	30.04	=19	Did not advance			
Thomas Hollingsworth	50 m breaststroke	30.64	25	Did not advance			
Luke Belton	100 m breaststroke	1:05.17	18	Did not advance			
Thomas Hollingsworth	100 m breaststroke	1:05.73	19	Did not advance			
Luke Belton	200 m breaststroke	2:21.28	13	—N/a		Did not advance	
Thomas Hollingsworth	200 m breaststroke	2:22.38	14	—N/a		Did not advance	
Xander Beaton	50 m butterfly	26.53	29	Did not advance			
Thomas Hollingsworth	50 m butterfly	26.22	28	Did not advance			
Miles Munro	50 m butterfly	25.16	=15 Q	24.49	13	Did not advance	
Thomas Hollingsworth	100 m butterfly	56.68	20	Did not advance			
Luke Belton	200 m individual medley	2:13.54	17	—N/a		Did not advance	
Thomas Hollingsworth	200 m individual medley	2:08.35	16	—N/a		Did not advance	
Thomas Hollingsworth; Ben Lowndes; Miles Munro; Jeremy Osborne	4 × 100 m freestyle relay	3:28.43	11	—N/a		Did not advance	
Luke Belton; James Jurkiewicz; Oliver Nightingale; Jeremy Osborne	4 × 200 metre freestyle relay	7:55.33	9	—N/a		Did not advance	
Luke Belton; Thomas Hollingsworth; James Jurkiewicz; Miles Munro	4 × 100 m medley relay	3:52.89	10	—N/a		Did not advance	

Women

Athlete	Event	Heat		Semifinal		Final	
Athlete	Event	Time	Rank	Time	Rank	Time	Rank
Courtney Butcher	50 m freestyle	27.48	28	Did not advance			
Courtney Butcher	100 m freestyle	59.79	27	Did not advance			
Courtney Butcher	50 m backstroke	31.37	17	Did not advance			
Courtney Butcher	100 m backstroke	1:08.46	21	Did not advance			
