= Cycling at the 2013 Island Games =

Cycling, for the 2013 Island Games, took place throughout the whole of Bermuda. This sport was contested from the 14 to 18 July 2013.

== Medal summary ==
=== Medal table ===
- Bermuda 2013 IG Cycling Medalists

* Host nation (Bermuda)

Rank	Nation	Gold	Silver	Bronze	Total
1	Guernsey	7	2	1	10
2	Isle of Man	2	3	3	8
3	Bermuda*	2	2	1	5
4	Menorca	2	1	0	3
5	Jersey	0	3	4	7
6	Faroe Islands	0	2	2	4
7	Western Isles	0	0	2	2
Totals (7 entries)		13	13	13	39

=== Men ===
Event	Gold		Silver		Bronze	
Road race	Tobyn Horton (GGY)	2:49:25.986	Torkil Veyhe (FRO)	2:49:40.466	Andrew Roche (IOM)	2:49:40.495
Time trial	Andrew Roche (IOM)	56:44.586	Torkil Veyhe (FRO)	59:48.660	Shannon Lawrence (BER)	1:00:42.536
Mountain bike criterium	El Hihioui Kamal (Menorca)	58:40.545	Elliot Baxter (IOM)	58:41.177	Leon Mazzone (IOM)	58:44.028
Mountain bike cross-country	El Hihioui Kamal (Menorca)	1:22:50.205	Elliot Baxter (IOM)	1:23:09.956	Helgi Winther Olsen (FRO)	1:24:43.355
Road race team	Guernsey; Aaron Bailey; Joshua Gosselin; Tobyn Horton; Matthew Osborn; Philip Touzeau		Isle of Man; Elliott Baxter; Darren Bell; Tom Black; Robin Garry; Paul Kneen; Josh Knights; Leon Mazzone; Christopher Nicholson; Andrew Roche; Robert Sorby		Jersey; Greg Mansell; Ryan O'Shea; Robin Ovenden; Christian Spence; Richard Tanguy	
Time trial team	Isle of Man; Elliott Baxter; Darren Bell; Tom Black; Robin Garry; Paul Kneen; Josh Knights; Leon Mazzone; Christopher Nicholson; Andrew Roche; Robert Sorby	3:01:08.750	Guernsey; Aaron Bailey; Joshua Gosselin; Tobyn Horton; Matthew Osborn; Philip Touzeau	3:03:48.341	Jersey; Greg Mansell; Ryan O'Shea; Robin Ovenden; Christian Spence; Richard Tanguy	3:04:33.416
Town centre criterium	Tobyn Horton (GGY)	59:36.691	Richard Tanguy (Jersey)	59:39.141	Greg Mansell (Jersey)	1:00:05.653
Mountain bike cross-country team	Guernsey; Andrew Colver; James Roe; Michael Serafin; Danny Shaw; Rob Smart		Menorca; Diego Escudero Escriba; El Hihioui Kamal; Pere Timoner		Isle of Man; Elliott Baxter; Darren Bell; Tom Black; Robin Garry; Paul Kneen; Josh Knights; Leon Mazzone; Christopher Nicholson; Andrew Roche; Robert Sorby	

=== Women ===
Event	Gold		Silver		Bronze	
Road race	Nicole Mitchell (BER)	2:08:19.161	Karen Bordage (BER)	2:08:19.211	Ann Bowditch (GGY)	2:08:19.600
Time trial	Ann Bowditch (GGY)	57:29.660	Susan Townsend (Jersey)	57:43.222	Súsanna Skylv Sørensen (FRO)	57:47.980
Road race team	Bermuda; Karen Bordage; Earlena Ingham; Nicole Mitchell		Guernsey; Marina Bleasdale; Ann Bowditch; Karina Bowie		Jersey; Kimberley Ashton; Susan Townsend	
Time trial team	Guernsey; Marina Bleasdale; Ann Bowditch; Karina Bowie	1:55:25.666	Jersey; Kimberley Ashton; Susan Townsend	1:56:33.109	Western Isles; Christina Mackenzie; Kerry MacPhee	1:58:12.458
Town centre criterium	Ann Bowditch (GGY)	40:10.841	Karen Bordage (BER)	40:11.445	Kerry MacPhee (Western Isles)	40:11.828
