= Sailing at the 2013 Island Games =

Sailing at the 2013 Island Games took place at the Spanish Point Boat Club in Pembroke Parish, Bermuda. Competition took place from 14 to 19 July 2013.

== Medal table ==
* Host nation (Bermuda)

Rank	Nation	Gold	Silver	Bronze	Total
1	(Anglesey) Ynys Môn	2	1	1	4
2	Åland	1	1	1	3
3	Bermuda*	0	1	1	2
Totals (3 entries)		3	3	3	9

Source: Bermuda 2013 Sailing Medal Tally

== Medal summary ==
=== Events ===
Event	Gold		Silver		Bronze	
Laser standard rig	Eifion Mon; Ynys Môn	20	Niklas Areschoug; Åland Islands	21	Dyfrig Mon; Ynys Môn	29
Laser radial rig	Markus Rönnberg; Åland Islands	25	Bleddyn Mon; Ynys Môn	31	Kalin Hillier; Bermuda	31
Team	Ynys Môn	100	Bermuda	106	Åland Islands	110
