= Madison Genesis =

British professional road cycling team

Team information
- UCI code: MGT
- Registered: United Kingdom
- Founded: 2013
- Disbanded: 2019
- Discipline: Road
- Status: UCI continental
- Bicycles: Genesis
- Components: Shimano
- Website: Team home page

Key personnel
- Team manager: Roger Hammond

Team name history
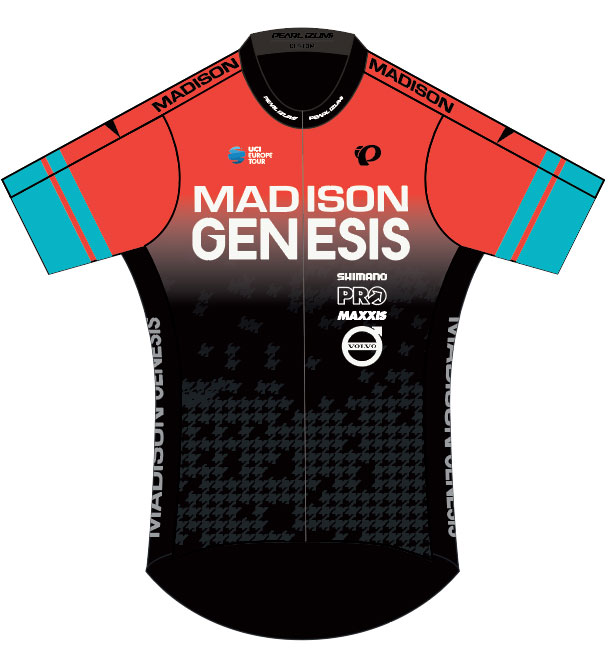
Madison Genesis jersey
Jersey

Madison Genesis was a British-based professional road cycling team, registered at UCI Continental level and competing in domestic and European competitions between 2013 and 2019.

Founded in 2013, the team was announced in July 2012 as a platform for developing UK road cycling talent. Team manager Roger Hammond stated that the team's success would be judged on how many riders progress on to the next level of UCI Professional Continental or World Tour racing.

Since, Alex Peters – one of Hammond's first signings – joined world tour Team Sky for 2016, while Scott Davies joined Dimension Data for 2018.

Tom Scully progressed from Madison Genesis in 2014-15, to professional continental team Drapac in 2016 and rode for world tour Cannondale-Drapac in 2017 and in 2018 EF Education First-Drapac p/b Cannondale.

Mark McNally joined professional continental squad Wanty Groupe Gobert in 2016.

In 2018 Connor Swift took the team's biggest victory, becoming British national road race champion.

In 2019, Swift joined UCI Pro Continental team Arkéa–Samsic midseason, while Matthew Holmes and Jonathan Dibben signed for World Tour team Lotto-Soudal at the end of the year.

The team announced it would cease racing at the end of the 2019 season.

== History ==
=== Formation ===
Brainchild of Madison CEO Dominic Langan, Madison Genesis was born in early 2012. Langan enlisted the advice of consultant Anthony McCrossan to help set up the team. Roger Hammond was chosen as team manager when McCrossan and Madison marketing director Kellie Parsons met. They exchanged folded pieces of paper – both containing the name of their preferred choice for the role – both reading Hammond.

=== Team progression ===
Hammond was hired and ten riders were signed to compete in the 2013 season. In year one the team would finish second at the Tour Series, with wins for Ian Bibby at the London Nocturne and Dean Downing at the Beaumont Trophy. Ahead of 2014, Hammond expressed how changes in personnel would improve the squad.

“What we have tried to do is introduce more riders, add more versatility in the team with more strength in-depth so that we can rotate the core of the team within the rotation of the team. So now we can have two rotations; the core of the team and the whole of the team. Hopefully, with that we can then balance motivation, form and racing at the right time".

Another second place at the Tour Series in 2014 was supplemented with a stage win at the An Post Ras for Liam Holohan, while Alex Peters won the under-23 general classification at the same race.

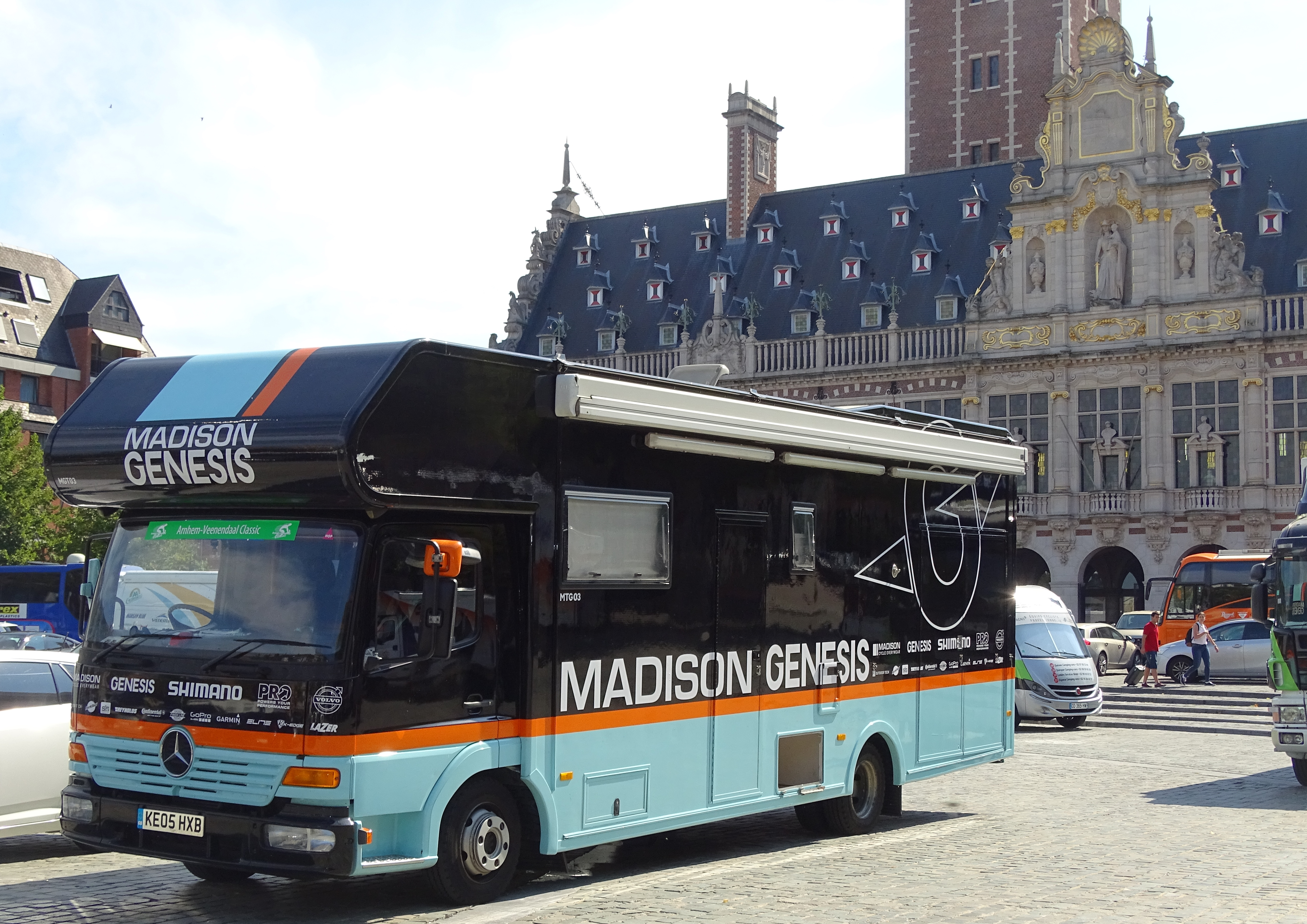

In 2015 Madison Genesis enjoyed its strongest season, which culminated in winning the Pearl Izumi Tour Series – along with Erick Rowsell taking eighth in the Tour de Yorkshire. Hammond's analysis revealed a team on the up.

"If we look at the goals we really went for – the Tour de Normandie, Tour de Yorkshire and Tour Series – then we can be really pleased. To be just three seconds off the overall win in Normandie was a really good start for us. "We then managed to be pretty competitive at the Tour de Yorkshire, and to get a top ten on GC in its first year was a really impressive result for us. "Even with bad luck in the final week of the Tour Series we’ve managed to hold on. We could have done without the bad luck but I’m really pleased to have won.”

Madison Genesis finished 2015 wearing the King of the Mountains jersey for three stages of the Tour of Britain, which produced a memorable battle until the final climb, where Hammond sent the entire squad to the front of the peloton, to chase the breakaway and try to regain the jersey.

In 2016, it was announced that Hammond would become a sports director at World Tour team Dimension Data - but would continue to act as a consultant to Madison Genesis. Mark Cavendish's CVNDSH Scholarship would support Madison Genesis riders with training and tactical advice.

Ex-team rider Mike Northey would transition to become Madison Genesis team manager in May 2016, after being forced to retire following the diagnosis of a heart virus earlier that year.

On the road, the team remained at the forefront of the British domestic scene, with Tom Stewart recording wins at the Lincoln GP, Velothon Wales and GP of Wales. Gruffudd Lewis wore the Best British Rider jersey at the Tour de Yorkshire while also scoring 2nd at the Cicle Classic 1.2, Tobyn Horton scored a top-ten position at RideLondon, while Erick Rowsell survived in the breakaway to finish third on stage five of the Tour of Britain.

In 2017 the team signed four new riders - Alex Paton, Johnny McEvoy, Rich Handley and Connor Swift - with Tristan Robbins, Felix English and Tom Stewart departing.

Connor Swift scored all three of the team's victories, with two coming at the Tour Series and one at the Leicester Castle Classic.

After the 2017 Tour of Britain, Mike Northey stepped down from his role as team manager to return home to his family in New Zealand.

In October 2017, Colin Sturgess was named as the team's new manager and five new signings were announced. George Atkins, Mike Cuming, Isaac Mundy, George Pym and Neil van der Ploeg all joined the 12-rider squad.

Success followed with Johnny McEvoy winning the Spring Cup series and Connor Swift becoming British national road race champion and winning the Wales Open Crit.

In October 2018, it was announced that Sturgess would depart the team, and Roger Hammond would return as manager.

Five new riders were announced for 2019 - Ian Bibby, Joe Laverick, Tom Moses, Jon Mould and Joey Walker.

In 2019 the team enjoyed success with Connor Swift and Joey Walker taking individual Tour Series victories, Ian Bibby winning the Lancaster GP and Matt Holmes winning the Manx International, finishing sixth at the Tour de Yorkshire and the best placed British rider at the Tour of Britain, with 15th overall.

The team announced it would cease racing at the end of the 2019 season.

== Bikes ==
In 2013 and 2014 Madison Genesis exclusively rode steel Genesis Volare bikes.

The team also had the choice of using the new carbon Genesis Zero frames for the 2014 Tour of Britain, with an updated version of the Zero launched for the team at the 2015 Tour of Britain.

A prototype bike appeared under Connor Swift at the 2017 Leicester Castle Classic - this was confirmed as the Genesis Zero SL, which the team raced throughout 2018.

Riders choose between carbon and steel bikes "dependant on the race and terrain faced."

== Major wins ==
2013
Stage 2 Totnes-Vire, Alex Peters
Les Ingman Memorial Trophy, Alex Peters
London Nocturne, Ian Bibby
Beaumont Trophy, Dean Downing
Elite Circuit Series – Sheffield GP, Dean Downing
UCI Track World Cup – Manchester (Team Pursuit), Andrew Tennant

2014
UCI Track World Cup – Guadalajara (Madison), Tom Scully
Overall Tour of the Reservoir, Alex Peters

Stage 1, Alex Peters

Stage 7 Rás Tailteann, Liam Holohan
London Nocturne, Tobyn Horton
Tour Series round 10, Tom Stewart
Tour Series round 9, team competition
Tour Series round 9, Tom Stewart
Tour Series round 8, Tobyn Horton
Tour Series round 2, team competition
Fenioux Track Championships (Omnium), Tom Scully
Beverley Criterium, Michael Northey

2015
Sheffield GP, Tom Scully
Tour Series round 1 - individual, Tom Scully
Tour Series round 2 - team competition
Tour Series round 3 - team competition
Tour Series round 4 - team competition
Tour Series round 6 - team competition
Tour Series round 10 - team competition
Overall Tour Series
Tour of the Reservoir, Erick Rowsell

2016
GP of Wales, Tom Stewart
Tour Series round 10 - individual, Alex Blain
Tour Series round 9 - team competition
Velothon Wales, Tom Stewart
Lincoln GP, Tom Stewart
Tour Series round 3, team competition
Stage 2 Tour of the Reservoir, Erick Rowsell
Totes-Vire, Matt Holmes

2017
Leicester Castle Classic, Connor Swift
Tour Series round 10, individual, Connor Swift
Tour Series round 6, individual, Connor Swift

2018
British national road race championships, Connor Swift
Wales Open Crit, Connor Swift

2019
Tour Series round 1, individual, Connor Swift
Tour Series round 4, individual, Joey Walker
Lancaster GP, Ian Bibby
Manx International, Matt Holmes

== National and continental championships ==
2013
European Track Championships (team pursuit), Andrew Tennant
2014
British U23 National Time Trial Championships, Scott Davies
Irish National Criterium Championships, Peter Hawkins
European Track Championships (team pursuit), Andrew Tennant
European Track Championships (individual pursuit), Andrew Tennant
2018
British National Road Race Championships, Connor Swift

== Team roster ==
Rider	Date of birth
Ian Bibby (GBR)	20 December 1986 (age 39)
Mike Cuming (GBR)	18 December 1990 (age 35)
Jonathan Dibben (GBR)	12 February 1994 (age 32)
Richard Handley (GBR)	1 September 1990 (age 36)
Matt Holmes (GBR)	8 December 1993 (age 32)
Tobyn Horton (GBR)	7 October 1986 (age 40)
Joe Laverick (GBR)	6 December 2000 (age 25)
Jonathan McEvoy (GBR)	2 August 1989 (age 37)

Rider	Date of birth
Tom Moses (GBR)	3 May 1992 (age 34)
Jon Mould (GBR)	4 April 1991 (age 35)
George Pym (GBR)	30 May 1994 (age 32)
Erick Rowsell (GBR)	20 July 1990 (age 36)
Connor Swift (GBR)	30 October 1995 (age 31)
Joey Walker (GBR)	15 September 1997 (age 29)

== Previous squads ==
=== 2018 ===
Rider	Date of birth
George Atkins (GBR)	18 August 1991 (age 35)
Mike Cuming (GBR)	18 December 1990 (age 35)
Taylor Gunman (NZL)	14 March 1991 (age 35)
Richard Handley (GBR)	1 September 1990 (age 36)
Matt Holmes (GBR)	8 December 1993 (age 32)
Tobyn Horton (GBR)	7 October 1986 (age 40)

Rider	Date of birth
Jonathan McEvoy (GBR)	2 August 1989 (age 37)
Isaac Mundy (GBR)	29 July 1990 (age 36)
Neil van der Ploeg (AUS)	23 September 1987 (age 39)
George Pym (GBR)	30 May 1994 (age 32)
Erick Rowsell (GBR)	20 July 1990 (age 36)
Connor Swift (GBR)	30 October 1995 (age 31)

=== 2017 ===
Rider	Date of birth
Alexandre Blain (FRA)	7 March 1981 (age 45)
Matt Cronshaw (GBR)	30 December 1988 (age 37)
Joe Evans (GBR)	2 December 1996 (age 29)
Taylor Gunman (NZL)	14 March 1991 (age 35)
Richard Handley (GBR)	1 September 1990 (age 36)
Matt Holmes (GBR)	8 December 1993 (age 32)

Rider	Date of birth
Tobyn Horton (GBR)	7 October 1986 (age 40)
Gruffudd Lewis (GBR)	10 November 1987 (age 39)
Jonathan McEvoy (GBR)	2 August 1989 (age 37)
Alex Paton (GBR)	10 May 1990 (age 36)
Erick Rowsell (GBR)	20 July 1990 (age 36)
Connor Swift (GBR)	30 October 1995 (age 31)

=== 2016 ===
Rider	Date of birth
Matt Cronshaw (GBR)	30 December 1988 (age 37)
Joe Evans (GBR)	2 December 1996 (age 29)
Matt Holmes (GBR)	8 December 1993 (age 32)
Felix English (IRE)	11 October 1992 (age 34)
Tobyn Horton (GBR)	7 October 1986 (age 40)
Gruffudd Lewis (GBR)	10 November 1987 (age 39)

Rider	Date of birth
Alexandre Blain (FRA)	7 March 1981 (age 45)
Mike Northey (NZL)	24 March 1987 (age 39)
Taylor Gunman (NZL)	14 March 1991 (age 35)
Tom Stewart (GBR)	9 January 1990 (age 36)
Tristan Robbins (GBR)	26 March 1996 (age 30)
Erick Rowsell (GBR)	20 July 1990 (age 36)

=== 2015 ===
Rider	Date of birth
Matt Cronshaw (GBR)	30 December 1988 (age 37)
Joe Evans (GBR)	2 December 1996 (age 29)
Matt Holmes (GBR)	8 December 1993 (age 32)
Martyn Irvine (IRE)	6 June 1985 (age 41)
Tobyn Horton (GBR)	7 October 1986 (age 40)
Liam Holohan (GBR)	22 February 1988 (age 38)
Dominic Jelfs (GBR)	31 March 1990 (age 36)

Rider	Date of birth
Mike Northey (NZL)	24 March 1987 (age 39)
James McLaughlin (GBR)	2 October 1990 (age 36)
Tom Scully (NZL)	14 January 1990 (age 36)
Mark McNally (GBR)	20 July 1989 (age 37)
Tom Stewart (GBR)	9 January 1990 (age 36)
Tristan Robbins (GBR)	26 March 1996 (age 30)
Erick Rowsell (GBR)	20 July 1990 (age 36)

=== 2014 ===
Rider	Date of birth
Ian Bibby (GBR)	22 December 1986 (age 39)
Scott Davies (GBR)	5 August 1995 (age 31)
Pete Hawkins (IRE)	16 December 1985 (age 40)
Matt Holmes (GBR)	8 December 1993 (age 32)
Liam Holohan (GBR)	22 February 1988 (age 38)
Tobyn Horton (GBR)	7 October 1986 (age 40)
Dominic Jelfs (GBR)	31 March 1990 (age 36)

Rider	Date of birth
Mike Northey (GBR)	24 March 1987 (age 39)
Alex Peters (GBR)	31 March 1994 (age 32)
Tom Scully (NZL)	14 January 1990 (age 36)
Chris Snook (GBR)	22 December 1986 (age 39)
Tom Stewart (GBR)	9 January 1990 (age 36)
Andy Tennant (GBR)	9 March 1987 (age 39)

=== 2013 ===
Rider	Date of birth
Sebastian Baylis (GBR)	19 February 1994 (age 32)
Ian Bibby (GBR)	22 December 1986 (age 39)
Dean Downing (GBR)	24 January 1975 (age 51)
Liam Holohan (GBR)	22 February 1988 (age 38)
Dominic Jelfs (GBR)	31 March 1990 (age 36)

Rider	Date of birth
Alex Peters (GBR)	31 March 1994 (age 32)
Jack Pullar (GBR)	15 November 1989 (age 36)
Chris Snook (GBR)	22 December 1986 (age 39)
Andy Tennant (GBR)	9 March 1987 (age 39)
Brennan Townshend (GBR)	8 July 1993 (age 33)
