= Isle of Man at the 2014 Commonwealth Games =

- Flag of the Isle of Man
- CG code: IOM
- CGA: Commonwealth Games Association of the Isle of Man
- Website: cga.im

in Glasgow, Scotland
- Flag bearer: Tim Kneale
- Medals Ranked 29th: Gold 0 Silver 1 Bronze 0 Total 1

Commonwealth Games appearances (overview)
- 1958; 1962; 1966; 1970; 1974; 1978; 1982; 1986; 1990; 1994; 1998; 2002; 2006; 2010; 2014; 2018; 2022; 2026; 2030

Isle of Man competed in the 2014 Commonwealth Games in Glasgow, Scotland from 23 July to 3 August 2014.

== Athletics ==
Men

Athlete	Event	Round 1		Semifinal		Final	
Athlete	Event	Result	Rank	Result	Rank	Result	Rank
Keith Gerrard	10,000 m	—N/a				29:46.85	22

Women

Athlete	Event	Round 1		Semifinal		Final	
Athlete	Event	Result	Rank	Result	Rank	Result	Rank
Harriet Pryke	400 m	56.15	6	Did not advance			

Athlete	Event	Qualification		Final	
Athlete	Event	Distance	Position	Distance	Position
Reagan Dee	High jump	1.71	=18	Did not advance	
Olivia Curran	Pole vault	—N/a		No Mark	

== Cycling ==
=== Mountain biking ===
Athlete	Event	Time	Rank
Elliot Baxter	Men's cross-country	1:53:06	17

=== Road ===
Men

Athlete	Event	Time	Rank
Peter Kennaugh	Road race	4:18:20	8

Women

Athlete	Event	Time	Rank
Anna Christian	Road race	2:44:12	18
Anna Christian	Time trial	45:48.65	14
Laura Wasley	Road race	DNF	
Laura Wasley	Time trial	50:07.14	26

=== Track ===
Points race

Athlete	Event	Qualification		Final	
Athlete	Event	Points	Rank	Points	Rank
Mark Christian	Men's point race	28	2 Q	DNF	
Joseph Kelly	Men's point race	4	8 Q	DNF	
Peter Kennaugh	Men's point race	29	1 Q	84	2nd place, silver medalist(s)

Scratch race

Athlete	Event	Qualification	Final
Athlete	Event	Rank	Rank
Mark Christian	Men's scratch race	6 Q	4
Joseph Kelly	Men's scratch race	4 Q	5
Peter Kennaugh	Men's scratch race	2 Q	13

== Gymnastics ==
=== Artistic ===
Men

Athlete	Event	Final							
Athlete	Event	Apparatus						Total	Rank
Athlete	Event	F	PH	R	V	PB	HB	Total	Rank
Alexander Hedges	Team	12.900	11.733	12.033	12.866	12.608	11.758	—N/a	
Harshul Measuria	Team	12.825	10.633	10.766	11.533	11.533	11.800	—N/a	
Mukunda Measuria	Team	11.633	9.766	6.033	11.100	12.500	10.400	—N/a	
Anand Patel	Team	10.700	10.533	6.666	13.266	12.400	10.800	—N/a	
Total	Team	37.758	32.899	29.465	37.665	37.508	34.358	209.253	11

Women

Athlete	Event	Final					
Athlete	Event	Apparatus				Total	Rank
Athlete	Event	V	UB	BB	F	Total	Rank
Nicole Burns	Team	12.866	9.433	10.100	12.433	—N/a	
Tara Donnelly	Team	13.300	10.000	11.483	11.733	—N/a	
Grace Harrison	Team	13.300	9.633	11.366	12.833	—N/a	
Kaitlin Kneen	Team	12.633	10.433	9.666	11.733	—N/a	
Total	Team	39.466	30.066	32.949	36.999	139.480	10

Individual all around final

Athlete	Event	Final					
Athlete	Event	Apparatus				Total	Rank
Athlete	Event	V	UB	BB	F	Total	Rank
Grace Harrison	Individual	13.133	11.533	10.333	12.600	47.599	21

== Shooting ==
Men
Pistol/Small bore

Athlete	Event	Qualification		Final	
Athlete	Event	Points	Rank	Points	Rank
Harry Creevy	50 m rifle prone	614.1	16	Did not advance	
Benjamin Kelly	50 m rifle prone	604.5	26	Did not advance	

Shotgun

Athlete	Event	Qualification		Semifinals		Final/BM	
Athlete	Event	Points	Rank	Points	Rank	Points	Rank
Neil Parsons	Trap	107	14	Did not advance			
David Walton	Trap	106	16	Did not advance			
Jake Keeling	Double trap	124	9	Did not advance			
Tim Kneale	Double trap	120	12	Did not advance			
James Bradley	Skeet	102	21	Did not advance			
David Clague	Skeet	111	16	Did not advance			

Women
Pistol/Small bore

Athlete	Event	Qualification		Final	
Athlete	Event	Points	Rank	Points	Rank
Rachel Glover	10 m air rifle	398.0	23	Did not advance	
Gemma Kermode	10 m air rifle	393.5	25	Did not advance	
Rachel Glover	50 m rifle prone	—N/a		608.5	17
Lara Anne Ward	50 m rifle prone	—N/a		606.1	19
Rachel Glover	50 m rifle 3 positions	548	20	Did not advance	
Gemma Kermode	50 m rifle 3 positions	554	18	Did not advance	

== Swimming ==
Men

Athlete	Event	Heat		Semifinal		Final	
Athlete	Event	Time	Rank	Time	Rank	Time	Rank
Tom Bielich	50 m freestyle	24.51	34	Did not advance			
Alex Bregazzi	50 m freestyle	25.08	38	Did not advance			
Tom Bielich	100 m freestyle	54.01	34	Did not advance			
Alex Bregazzi	100 m freestyle	54.00	33	Did not advance			
Alex Bregazzi	200 m freestyle	1:56.49	24	—N/a		Did not advance	
Alex Bregazzi	400 m freestyle	4:12.59	24	—N/a		Did not advance	
Grant Halsall	50 m backstroke	26.51	13 Q	26.72	14	Did not advance	
Grant Halsall	100 m backstroke	57.82	15 Q	56.78	14	Did not advance	
Grant Halsall	200 m backstroke	2:05.30	10	—N/a		Did not advance	
Guy Davies	50 m breaststroke	30.28	23	Did not advance			
Guy Davies	100 m breaststroke	1:05.92	20	Did not advance			
Guy Davies	200 m breaststroke	2:19.72	12	—N/a		Did not advance	
Alex Bregazzi	100 m butterfly	59.69	26	Did not advance			
Grant Halsall	100 m butterfly	54.00	13 Q	54.15	13	Did not advance	
Alex Bregazzi	200 m butterfly	2:15.42	15	—N/a		Did not advance	
Tom Bielich; Alex Bregazzi; Guy Davies; Grant Halsall	4 × 100 m freestyle relay	3:37.31	12	—N/a		Did not advance	
Tom Bielich; Alex Bregazzi; Guy Davies; Grant Halsall	4 × 200 metre freestyle relay	8:06.38	10	—N/a		Did not advance	
Tom Bielich; Alex Bregazzi; Guy Davies; Grant Halsall	4 × 100 m medley relay	3:58.66	12	—N/a		Did not advance	

Women

Athlete	Event	Heat		Semifinal		Final	
Athlete	Event	Time	Rank	Time	Rank	Time	Rank
Laura Kinley	50 m freestyle	27.34	25	Did not advance			
Charlotte Atkinson	100 m freestyle	58.82	23	Did not advance			
Niamh Robinson	50 m backstroke	31.03	15 Q	31.30	16	Did not advance	
Laura Kinley	50 m breaststroke	31.97	12 Q	32.05	11	Did not advance	
Niamh Robinson	50 m breaststroke	33.28	16 Q	33.38	15	Did not advance	
Laura Kinley	100 m breaststroke	1:10.90	16 Q	1:10.99	16	Did not advance	
Niamh Robinson	100 m breaststroke	1:15.74	26	Did not advance			
Laura Kinley	200 m breaststroke	2:36.25	14	—N/a		Did not advance	
Niamh Robinson	200 m breaststroke	2:40.00	19	—N/a		Did not advance	
Charlotte Atkinson	50 m butterfly	27.63	17	Did not advance			
Niamh Robinson	50 m butterfly	29.30	27	Did not advance			
Charlotte Atkinson	100 m butterfly	59.80	11 Q	1:00.12	11	Did not advance	
Charlotte Atkinson	200 m butterfly	2:16.64	16	—N/a		Did not advance	
Niamh Robinson	200 m individual medley	2:23.75	18	—N/a		Did not advance	

== Triathlon ==
Athlete	Event	Swim (1.5 km)	Bike (40 km)	Run (10 km)	Total Time	Rank
Andrew Nash	Men's	23:16	LAP			
