= Basketball at the 2013 Island Games =

Basketball, for the 2013 Island Games, took place at the Bermuda College. It took place from 13 to 18 July 2013.

Due to that only two island entities (Bermuda and Saaremaa) have entered their men's basketball squads to these Games, only the gold medal was awarded here. Bermuda won the gold medal here.

== Medal table ==
* Host nation (Bermuda)

| Rank | Nation | Gold | Silver | Bronze | Total |
|---|---|---|---|---|---|
| 1 | Bermuda* | 1 | 0 | 0 | 1 |
| Totals (1 entries) | | 1 | 0 | 0 | 1 |

== Results ==
| Event | Gold | Silver | Bronze |
|---|---|---|---|
| Men's | Bermuda; Christopher Crumpler; Vernon Lambe III; Sullivan Phillips; Steven Simons; Jaren Haley; John Lee; Yusef Riley; Shannon Thompson; Aaron Jackson; Jason Lowe; Jason Simons; William Trott; Dean Jones | | |
