= Golf at the 2013 Island Games =

Coordinates: 32.2609°N 64.8738°W

Golf, for the 2013 Island Games, took place at the Port Royal Golf Course in Southampton Parish, Bermuda. The competition ran from 15 to 18 July 2013.

== Medal table ==
- Bermuda 2013 IG Golf Medal Tally

* Host nation (Bermuda)

Rank	Nation	Gold	Silver	Bronze	Total
1	Bermuda (BER)*	1	1	0	2
1	Guernsey (GGY)	1	1	0	2
3	Gotland (Gotland)	1	0	1	2
3	Jersey (JEY)	1	0	1	2
5	Isle of Wight (IOW)	0	2	0	2
6	Cayman Islands (CAY)	0	0	1	1
6	Åland (ALA)	0	0	1	1
Totals (7 entries)		4	4	4	12

=== Medal summary ===
==== Men ====
Event	Gold		Silver		Bronze	
Individual	Gavin O'Neill (Jersey)	297	Jarryd Dillas (BER)	298	Johan Lindholm (ALA)	301
Team	Bermuda	905	Isle of Wight	906	Jersey	912

==== Women ====
Event	Gold		Silver		Bronze	
Individual	Lina Billing (Gotland)	313	Aimee Ponte (GGY)	318	Samantha Widmer (CAY)	320
Team	Guernsey	997	Isle of Wight	1000	Gotland	1009
