= Pedal Heaven Race Team =

Pedal Heaven

Team information
- UCI code: PHE
- Registered: United Kingdom
- Founded: 2008
- Discipline: Road
- Status: Elite National (2014–2015); UCI Continental (2016–)
- Bicycles: Specialized
- Components: Shimano Dura Ace groupset, Edco wheels, Continental tyres, Pro Vision clothing
- Website: Team home page

Key personnel
- General manager: Craig Peter
- Team managers: Tim Elverson (Directeur Sportif); Anders Christensen (Assistant DS); Simon Holt (Assistant DS); James Taylor(Assistant DS)

Team name history
- 2008-2013 2014 2015 2016–: Pedal Heaven RT; Pedal Heaven Colbornes RT; Pedal Heaven RT; Pedal Heaven
Pedal Heaven Race Team jersey
Jersey

Pedal Heaven Race Team is a professional men's cycling team based in Great Britain, which competes in elite road bicycle racing events under UCI Continental rules.

== Major wins ==
2014
Imperial Winter Series 7 (Hillingdon), Jake Martin
South of England Road Championships, Alex Paton
Hillingdon Grand Prix, Alex Paton
Ottershaw Series 1, Lewis Atkins
Ottershaw Series 2, Lewis Atkins
Ottershaw Series 3, Lewis Atkins
Durham University Cyclo Cross, Alex Paton
2015
Evesham Vale RR, Dave McGowan
March Hare Classic, Rory Townsend
Peter Young Memorial RR, Rory Townsend
BUCS Road Race Championship, Rory Townsend
Guildford Criterium, Alex Paton
Stage 2 Suir Valley, David McGowan
South East Divisional Championships, Rob Moore
Welsh Road Championships, Stevie Williams
2016
East and South-East Regional Cyclocross Championships (Senior Men), Alex Paton
Tour of Al Zubarah (UCI 2.2, Prologue (ITT)), Jacob Tipper
Perfs Pedal RR, Rory Townsend
BUCS Road Race Championships, Harry Tanfield
Roy Thame Cup, Matthew Clarke (Excel Academy)
Jim Rogers Memorial RR, James Gullen
Evesham Vale RR, Jacob Tipper
SERRL Summer Series #3, Will Harper (Excel Academy)
2nd Jock Wadley Memorial RR, Lloyd Chapman
Duncan Sparrow RR, James Gullen
Wally Gimber Trophy, Lloyd Chapman
3rd Chorley Grand Prix, Dexter Gardias

== Team roster ==
As of 16 January 2016.

Rider	Date of birth
Ian Wilkinson (GBR)	14 April 1979 (age 47)
James Gullen (GBR)	15 October 1989 (age 36)
Will Fox (GBR)	28 October 1988 (age 37)
Harry Tanfield (GBR)	17 November 1994 (age 31)
Mitchell Webber (GBR)	6 June 1995 (age 31)
Jack Pullar (GBR)	15 November 1989 (age 36)

Rider	Date of birth
Rory Townsend (GBR)	30 May 1995 (age 31)
Dave McGowan (GBR)	29 August 1980 (age 46)
Jake Womersley (GBR)	12 December 1995 (age 30)
Harrison Jones (GBR)	18 February 1997 (age 29)
Joseph Fry (GBR)	25 January 1997 (age 29)
Grant Ferguson (GBR)	15 November 1993 (age 32)
Lloyd Chapman (GBR)	30 August 1989 (age 37)
Dexter Gardias (GBR)	3 December 1990 (age 35)
Jacob Tipper (GBR)	2 December 1991 (age 34)
Alex Paton (GBR)	10 May 1990 (age 36)
Max Stedman (GBR)	22 March 1996 (age 30)

== Excel Academy team ==
The Excel Academy team is a feeder team running in parallel to the UCI Continental team, with its own dedicated race calendar and plan enabling ambitious riders to develop with the support of more experienced team members.

As of 16 January 2016.

Rider	Date of birth
Alex Richardson (GBR)	{{{birthdate}}}
Will Harper (GBR)	{{{birthdate}}}
David Hewett (GBR)	11 September 1994 (age 31)
George Ellis (GBR)	30 June 1994 (age 32)
Tom Mazzone (GBR)	9 July 1993 (age 33)
Matthew Clarke (GBR)	24 April 1994 (age 32)

Rider	Date of birth
Lewis Atkins (GBR)	25 May 1988 (age 38)
Warren Jesse (GBR)	{{{birthdate}}}
Rob McCarthy (GBR)	12 August 1985 (age 41)
Jake Yarranton (GBR)	{{{birthdate}}}
Paul Pickup (GBR)	{{{birthdate}}}
Anders Christensen (GBR)	{{{birthdate}}}
