= Volleyball at the 2013 Island Games =

Volleyball, for the 2013 Island Games, took place at the Berkeley Institute (Pembroke Parish) and the Cedarbridge Academy (Devonshire Parish). This event took place from 14 to 19 July 2013.

== Medal table ==
* Host nation (Bermuda)

Rank	Nation	Gold	Silver	Bronze	Total
1	Saare County	1	1	0	2
2	Faroe Islands	1	0	0	1
3	Åland	0	1	0	1
4	Bermuda*	0	0	1	1
4	Greenland	0	0	1	1
Totals (5 entries)		2	2	2	6

Source: Bermuda 2013 Volleyball Medal Tally

== Events ==
- Bermuda 2013 Volleyball Results

Event	Gold	Silver	Bronze
Men	Saare County	Åland Islands	Bermuda
Women	Faroe Islands	Saare County	Greenland
