= Triathlon at the 2013 Island Games =

Triathlon, for the 2013 Island Games, were held at Clearwater Beach on St. David's Island, Bermuda. All events for this sport were contested on 14 July 2013.

== Medal table ==
- Bermuda 2013 Triathlon Medal Tally

* Host nation (Bermuda)

Rank	Nation	Gold	Silver	Bronze	Total
1	Western Isles	2	0	0	2
2	Orkney	1	1	0	2
3	Gibraltar	1	0	0	1
4	Bermuda*	0	1	1	2
4	Shetland	0	1	1	2
6	Faroe Islands	0	1	0	1
7	Guernsey	0	0	1	1
7	Isle of Man	0	0	1	1
Totals (8 entries)		4	4	4	12

== Events ==
- 2013 IG Triathlon Results Page

Event	Gold	Silver	Bronze
Men's individual	Bobby Oag (Orkney)	Gudmundur Joensen (FRO)	Peter Fenwick (Shetland)
Women's individual	Kerry MacPhee (Western Isles)	Lynsey Henderson (Shetland)	Laurie Orchard (BER)
Men's team	Gibraltar	Orkney	Isle of Man
Women's team	Western Isles	Bermuda	Guernsey
