= Beach volleyball at the 2013 Island Games =

Beach volleyball, for the 2013 Island Games, took place at the National Sports Center (North Field) in Devonshire Parish. Competition took place from 13 to 17 July 2013.

== Medal table ==
| Rank | Nation | Gold | Silver | Bronze | Total |
|---|---|---|---|---|---|
| 1 | Menorca | 1 | 0 | 1 | 2 |
| 2 | Saare County | 1 | 0 | 0 | 1 |
| 3 | Cayman Islands | 0 | 2 | 0 | 2 |
| 4 | Gotland | 0 | 0 | 1 | 1 |
| Totals (4 entries) | | 2 | 2 | 2 | 6 |

Source: Bermuda 2013 Beach Volleyball Medal Tally

== Events ==
| Event | Gold | Silver | Bronze |
|---|---|---|---|
| Men | Saare County; Siim Põlluäär; Keith Pupart | Cayman Islands; Richard Campbell; Philippe Deslandes | Menorca; Ramon Linares; José María Olivar |
| Women | Menorca; Maria Bonafont; Vanesa Ruiz | Cayman Islands; Cristin Alexander; Jessica Wolfenden | Gotland; Jenny Sander; Sofia Wahlén |

== Group stage ==
=== Men ===
==== Pool C ====
| Pos | Team | Pld | W | L | Pts | SW | SL | SR | SPW | SPL | SPR |
|---|---|---|---|---|---|---|---|---|---|---|---|
| 1 | Yves Charbonneau – David Gazzard (Bermuda1) | 1 | 1 | 0 | 2 | 2 | 0 | MAX | 42 | 27 | 1.556 |
| 2 | Ramon Linares – José María Olivar (Menorca) | 1 | 1 | 0 | 2 | 2 | 0 | MAX | 42 | 32 | 1.313 |
| 3 | Shervin Rankin – Olney Thompson (Cayman Islands2) | 1 | 0 | 1 | 1 | 0 | 2 | 0.000 | 32 | 42 | 0.762 |
| 4 | Jens Heri Bolstad Mortensen – Alex Troleis (Faroe Islands1) | 1 | 0 | 1 | 1 | 0 | 2 | 0.000 | 27 | 42 | 0.643 |

| 14 July 2013; 10:00 | Charbonneau – Gazzard | 2–0 | Mortensen – Troleis | National Sports Centre North Field |
| 14 July 2013; 10:00 | (21–13, 21–14) | | | National Sports Centre North Field |

| 14 July 2013; 11:00 | Linares – Olivar | 2–0 | Rankin – Thompson | National Sports Centre North Field |
| 14 July 2013; 11:00 | (21–16, 21–16) | | | National Sports Centre North Field |

| 14 July 2013; 16:00 | Mortensen – Troleis | v | Linares – Olivar | National Sports Centre North Field |

| 15 July 2013; 09:00 | Charbonneau – Gazzard | v | Rankin – Thompson | National Sports Centre North Field |

| 15 July 2013; 19:00 | Rankin – Thompson | v | Mortensen – Troleis | National Sports Centre North Field |

| 16 July 2013; 10:00 | Charbonneau – Gazzard | v | Linares – Olivar | National Sports Centre North Field |
