= Sailboarding at the 2013 Island Games =

Sailboarding, also known as Windsurfing for the 2013 Island Games, will take place at the Spanish Point Boat Club in Pembroke Parish. The schedule states that medals will be awarded on 19 July 2013. However, depending on the weather, preliminary races could occur from 13 to 18 July 2013.

== Medal table ==
- Bermuda 2013 Sailboarding Medal Tally

* Host nation (Bermuda)

Rank	Nation	Gold	Silver	Bronze	Total
1	Cayman Islands (CAY)	1	0	0	1
1	Jersey (JEY)	1	0	0	1
3	Guernsey (GGY)	0	1	0	1
4	Bermuda (BER)*	0	0	1	1
Totals (4 entries)		2	1	1	4

=== Medal summary ===
Event	Gold		Silver		Bronze	
Individual	Andrew Petts; Cayman Islands	27	Pierre le Page; Guernsey	54	Alex Jones; Bermuda	55
Team	Jersey	386	Not awarded		Not awarded	
