= Jack Pullar =

British cyclist

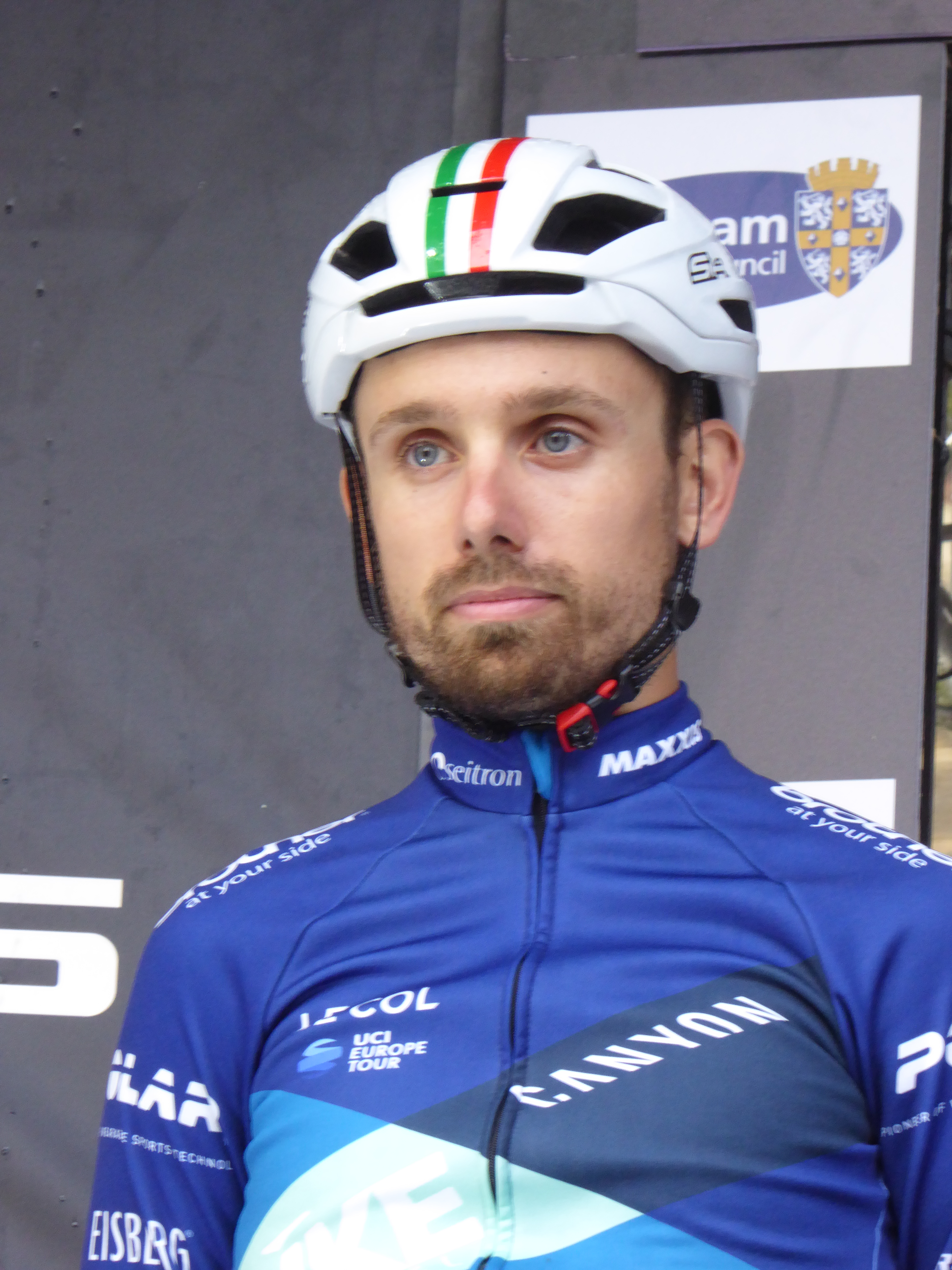
- Pullar in 2017.

Personal information
- Full name: Jack Campbell Pullar
- Born: 15 November 1989 (age 36) Lancaster, Lancashire, United Kingdom

Cycling career
- Sport: Cycling
- Current team: Retired
- Discipline: Road
- Role: Rider

Amateur teams
- 2006: Lune Racing Cycling Club
- 2007–2009: KUK Kinesis
- 2010: Herbalife–Leisure Lakes Bikes.com
- 2011: Vanillabikes.com
- 2012: Wheelbase MGD
- 2014–2015: Velosure Starley Racing

Professional teams
- 2013: Madison Genesis
- 2016: Pedal Heaven
- 2017–2018: Bike Channel–Canyon

Jack Campbell Pullar (born 15 November 1989) is a British former racing cyclist, who rode professionally between 2013 and 2018 for Canyon Eisberg, Pedal Heaven, Madison Genesis, Velosure-Starley Racing, Wheelbase and Vanilla Bikes. Pullar has worked with coach and teammate James Gullen.

Pullar won the British National Hill Climb Championships in 2012.

Pullar was part of the Scottish national team during the 2014 Commonwealth Games where he competed in the Men's Road Race alongside David Millar, Evan Oliphant and Andrew Fenn, although he failed to finish in a race of attrition with only twelve finishers.

== Major results ==
2012
1st National Hill Climb Championships
2013
4th Stockton Town Centre Race
8th Ryedale Grand Prix
9th Colne Grand Prix
2014
6th Cycle Wiltshire Grand Prix
8th Lincoln Grand Prix
2016
2nd Jim Rogers Memorial Road Race
2nd Ryedale Grand Prix
3rd Eddie Soens Memorial
