= Greg Mansell =

British former racing driver and road cyclist (born 1987)

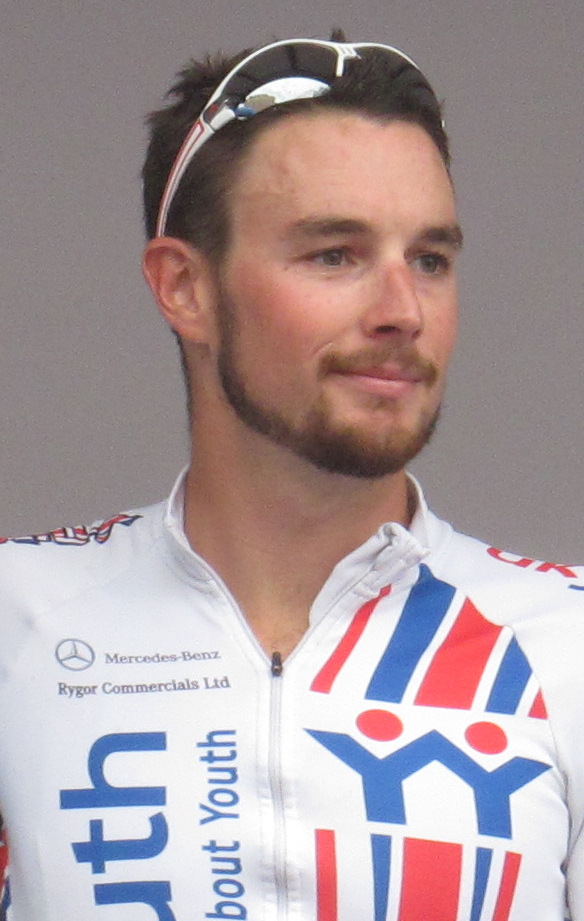
- Mansell in 2012
- Nationality: (United Kingdom) British
- Born: Greg Nigel Mansell; 8 November 1987 (age 39) Douglas, Isle of Man

Formula Renault 3.5 Series career
- Debut season: 2009
- Current team: Comtec Racing
- Car number: 17
- Former teams: Ultimate Motorsport
- Starts: 15
- Wins: 0
- Poles: 0
- Fastest laps: 0
- Best finish: 15th in 2010

Previous series
- 2008 2006–07 2006: Atlantic Championship; British Formula Three; Formula BMW UK

Greg Nigel Mansell (born 8 November 1987) is a British former racing driver and road cyclist, currently racing in cycling's Halfords Tour Series, having previously competed in motorsports Formula Renault 3.5 Series. He is the son of 1992 Formula One world champion and 1993 PPG IndyCar World Series champion, Nigel Mansell, and younger brother of fellow racing driver Leo Mansell.

== Motorsports ==
Greg and his older brother raced in the same series until 2009, starting with Karting in 2005. The brothers moved into single-seater racing in 2006, in the Formula BMW UK series.

In Formula BMW, the brothers disappointed, however, with Greg managing just 24 points, and Leo not managing any, while champion Niall Breen amassed 305.

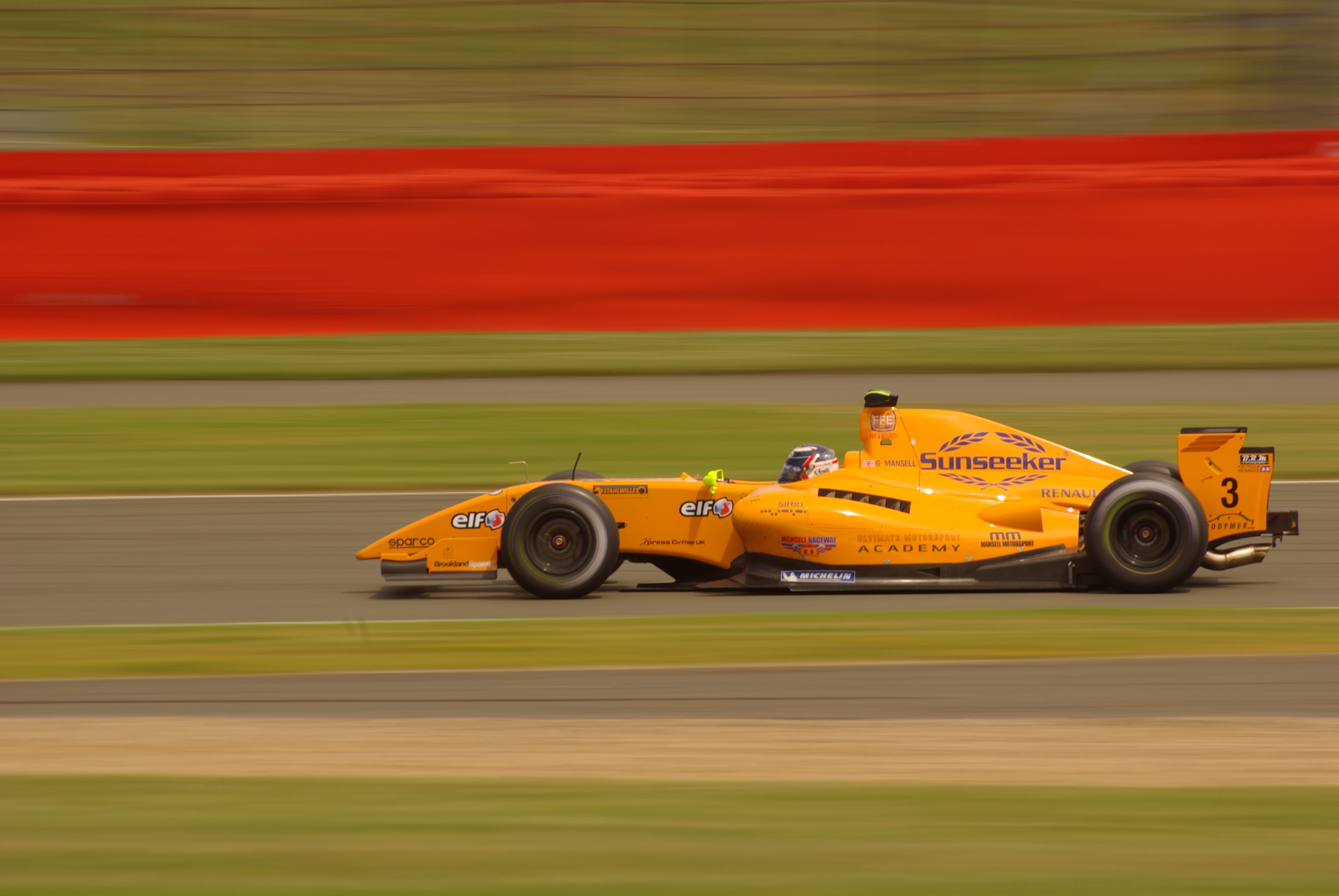
Mansell driving for Ultimate Motorsport at the Silverstone round of the 2009 Formula Renault 3.5 Series season.

Despite this, the pair were granted drives in the finale of the 2006 British Formula Three Championship at Thruxton, driving for the Fortec Motorsport team, in Invitational Class, with Greg finishing in a promising eighth position with the second fastest time in the first race, with engine over heating he struggled to 18th in the second race.

Greg finished third and on the podium for the first time in 2007 at Donington Park in the 3rd British Formula Three round, and had two more podiums after that with 16 top ten finishes.

For 2008, Greg and Leo Mansell moved to the American Atlantics, both driving for Walker Racing. The following year, Greg returned to Europe to compete in the 2009 Formula Renault 3.5 Series season, racing for both Ultimate Motorsport and Comtec Racing, finishing 26th in the championship. He will continue with Comtec into the 2010 season, partnering Stefano Coletti.

In addition to competing in the Formula Renault 3.5 series in 2010, he also co-drove a Ginetta-Zytek GZ09S – with his brother Leo and father Nigel – in select Le Mans Series events and in the 24 Hours of Le Mans. At the 8 Hours of Castellet they finished ninth overall (eighth in LMP1), but their Le Mans effort was cut short due to a tyre failure and crash by Nigel early in the event. But the comeback was set and the brothers won their first race back in the car at Hungary 1000 km finishing 1st in LMP1.

== Cycling ==
Greg Mansell
Personal information
- Full name: Greg Nigel Mansell
- Born: 8 November 1987 (age 39) Douglas (Isle of Man)

Cycling career
- Sport: Cycling
- Current team: Retired
- Discipline: Road
- Role: Rider
- Rider type: Sprinter

Professional teams
- 2011–2013: UK Youth
- 2014: NFTO

Having competed in swimming since 2006, Mansell started competing in cycling at the start of the 2011 season, taking his first ever win at the Mountbatten Circuit Race in Swinemouth earlier that year. He competed in the 2011 Halfords Tour Series for Team UK Youth. He finished 11th in the Men's Omnium at the 2012 British National Track Cycling Championships and 8th in the same event in 2013.

Mansell won an individual bronze representing Jersey in the Town centre criterium at the 2013 Island Games. He was also a member of the bronze winning Jersey team in Men's Team Road Race and Men's Time Trial Team Award.

For the 2014 season, Mansell rode for NFTO Pro Cycling, alongside former UK Youth riders Jon Mould and Josh Hunt.

== Motorsport Racing record ==
=== American open–wheel racing results ===
(key) (Races in bold indicate pole position) (Races in italics indicate fastest lap)

==== Atlantic Championship ====
Year	Team	1	2	3	4	5	6	7	8	9	10	11	12	Rank	Points
2008	Walker Racing	LBH; 13	LS; Ret	MTT; DNS	EDM1; 9	EDM2; Ret	ROA1; 12	ROA2; 13	TRR; 9	NJ; 7	UTA; 9	ATL; 5		**10th**	**167**
2009	Genoa Racing	SEB	UTA	NJ1	NJ2	LIM	ACC1	ACC2	MOH	TRR	MOS	ATL; Ret	LS	**20th**	**4**

=== Complete Formula Renault 3.5 Series results ===
(key) (Races in bold indicate pole position) (Races in italics indicate fastest lap)

Year	Team	1	2	3	4	5	6	7	8	9	10	11	12	13	14	15	16	17	Pos	Points
2009	Ultimate Motorsport	CAT; 1; 13	CAT; 2; 10	SPA; 1; 13	SPA; 2; 9	MON; 1; 13	HUN; 1; 15	HUN; 2 Ret	SIL; 1; 11	SIL; 2; 22	BUG; 1; 12	BUG; 2 Ret	ALG; 1; 11	ALG; 2; 13	NÜR; 1	NÜR; 2			26th	4
2009	Comtec Racing																ALC; 1; 10	ALC; 2; 14	26th	4
2010	Comtec Racing	ALC; 1; 8	ALC; 2 Ret	SPA; 1; 5	SPA; 2; 14	MON; 1; 15	BRN; 1; 11	BRN; 2; 14	MAG; 1; 18	MAG; 2; 12	HUN; 1 Ret	HUN; 2; 5	HOC; 1; 6	HOC; 2 Ret	SIL; 1; 10	SIL; 2 Ret	CAT; 1; 9	CAT; 2; 16	15th	23

=== Complete 24 Hours of Le Mans results ===
Year	Team	Co-Drivers	Car	Class	Laps	Pos.	Class Pos.
2010	(United Kingdom) Beechdean Mansell	(United Kingdom) Nigel Mansell (United Kingdom) Leo Mansell	Ginetta-Zytek GZ09S	LMP1	4	DNF	DNF
