= Tobyn Horton =

British cyclist (born 1986)

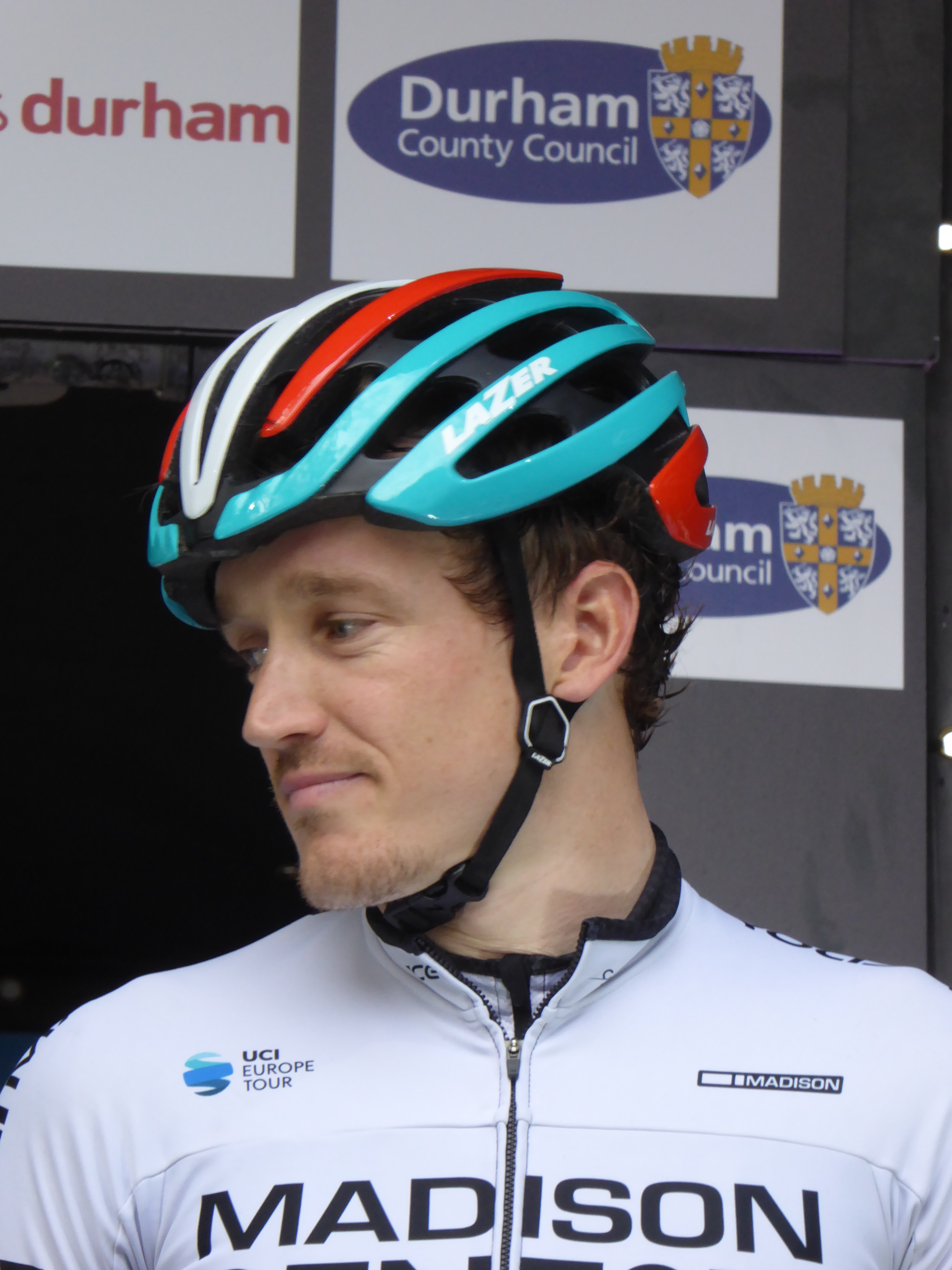
- Horton in 2017.

Personal information
- Full name: Tobyn Scott Horton
- Born: 7 October 1986 (age 40) Guernsey
- Height: 1.73 m (5 ft 8 in)
- Weight: 70 kg (150 lb; 11 st)

Cycling career
- Sport: Cycling
- Current team: Retired
- Discipline: Road
- Role: Rider
- Rider type: Criterium

Amateur teams
- 2005–2006: Kingsnorth International Wheelers
- 2007: Team Onder Ons Parike
- 2008–2009: Team Deschuytter Westkerke

Professional teams
- 2010: Team Sprocket Pro Cycling
- 2011: Motorpoint Pro–Cycling Team
- 2012: Team Raleigh–GAC
- 2013: Team UK Youth
- 2014–2019: Madison Genesis
Medal record
Representing Guernsey
Men's road cycling
Island Games
Gold medal – first place	2013 Bermuda	Road Race
Gold medal – first place	2011 Isle of Wight	Criterium
Gold medal – first place	2013 Bermuda	Criterium

Tobyn Scott Horton (born 7 October 1986) is a British former professional road racing cyclist from Guernsey. Originally a Mountain bike specialist as a child he later switched to road racing; he was successful at Island Games and British Domestic levels, also competing in the Commonwealth Games representing Guernsey and the Tour Series, in which he took wins for a number of professional teams.

== Major results ==
2008
8th East Midlands International CiCLE Classic
2009
10th East Midlands International CiCLE Classic
2010
5th Tour of the Reservoir
5th Ronde van Midden-Nederland
10th Ronde Pévéloise
2011
Island Games

1st Criterium
4th Time trial
8th Road race

8th London Nocturne
2012
6th London Nocturne
8th Ster van Zwolle
2013
Island Games

1st Road race
1st Criterium
4th Time trial

2014
1st London Nocturne
4th Beaumont Trophy
2015
5th Arno Wallaard Memorial
8th London Nocturne
2016
8th London–Surrey Classic
2018
7th Road race, Commonwealth Games
10th Rutland–Melton CiCLE Classic
