= Andrew Roche =

Manx cyclist (born 1971)

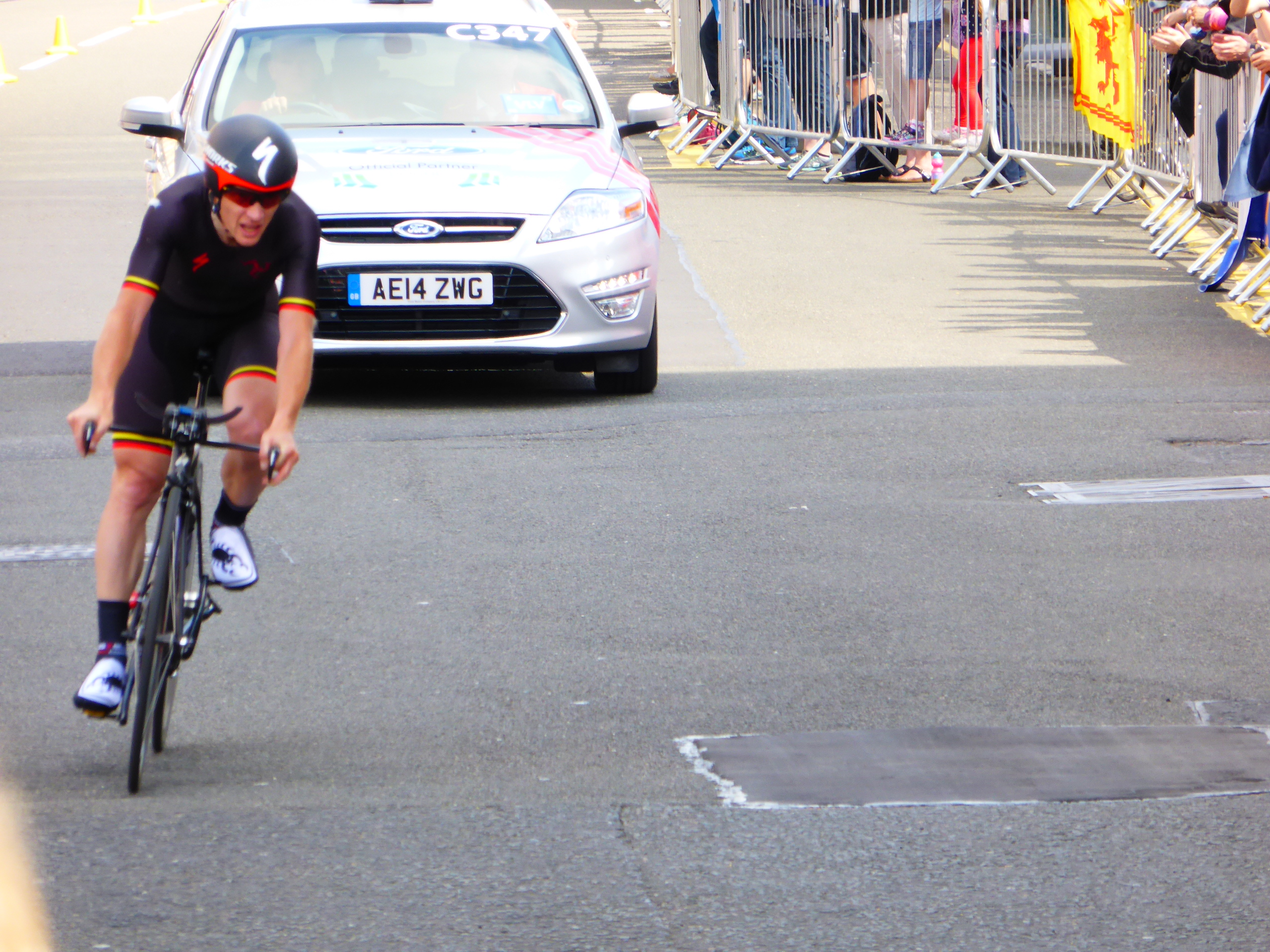
- Roche at the 2014 Commonwealth Games

Personal information
- Born: November 22, 1971 (age 54) Ramsey, Isle of Man

Cycling career
- Sport: Cycling
- Discipline: Road
- Role: Rider

Amateur teams
- 1996–2003: Ellan Vannin Cycling Club
- 2004: Team Maestro
- 2007: Pinarello RT

Professional teams
- 2003: Team Maestro–Nella
- 2005: Team Rochelle
- 2006: Team Murphy & Gunn
- 2008–2011: Pinarello Racing Team

Major wins
- Rás Tailteann, 1997
Medal record
Men's cycling
Representing Isle of Man
Island Games
Gold medal – first place	2003 Guernsey	individual time trial
Gold medal – first place	2005 Shetland	mountain bike cross-country individual
Gold medal – first place	2005 Shetland	mountain bike criterium individual
Gold medal – first place	2011 Isle of Wight	individual time trial
Gold medal – first place	2011 Isle of Wight	team time trial
Gold medal – first place	2011 Isle of Wight	mountain bike criterium team
Gold medal – first place	2011 Isle of Wight	team road race
Bronze medal – third place	2011 Isle of Wight	individual road race
Gold medal – first place	2013 Bermuda	individual time trial
Gold medal – first place	2013 Bermuda	team time trial
Silver medal – second place	2013 Bermuda	team road race
Bronze medal – third place	2013 Bermuda	mountain bike cross-country team
Bronze medal – third place	2013 Bermuda	individual road race

Andrew Roche (born 22 November 1971) is a Manx cyclist. He won the Rás Tailteann in 1997, and has competed at seven Commonwealth Games.

== Early life ==
Roche grew up in Ramsey, Isle of Man.

== Career ==
Roche began cycling competitively in 1984, aged 12, and began road racing in 1986. He competed in his first major tournament at the 1990 Commonwealth Games; he also appeared at the Games in 1994, 1998, 2002, 2006, 2010 and 2014. His best finish was at the 2006 road time trial, in which he finished 11th. He was second at the Manx International in 1992 and won the Rás Tailteann in 1997. Roche also competed at several Island Games and carried the Manx flag at the 2010 Commonwealth Games opening ceremony.

He currently works as a coach with his company, Watts Up Performance.
