= James McLaughlin (cyclist) =

Guernsey cyclist (born 1990)

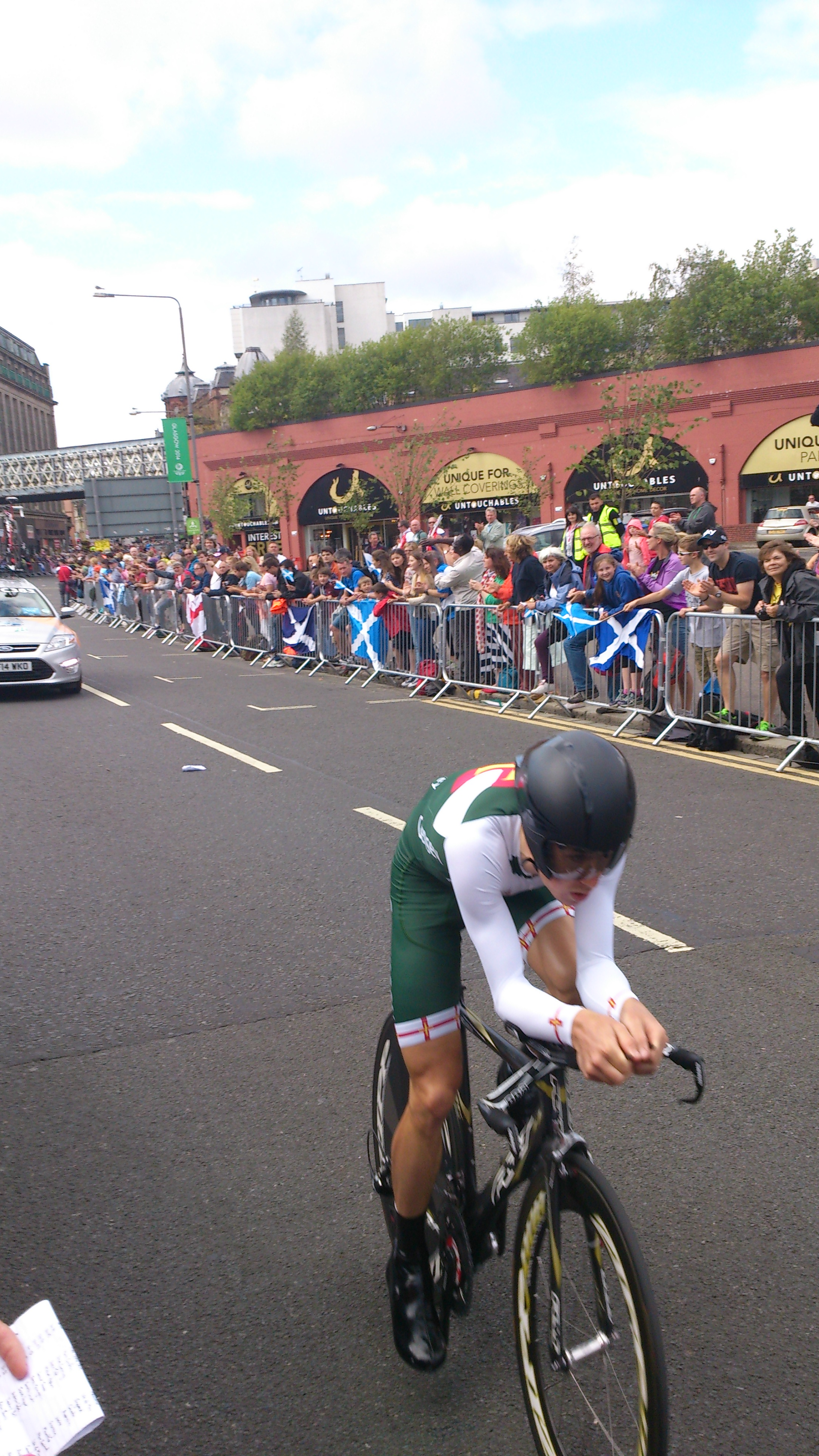
- McLaughlin at the 2014 Commonwealth Games

Personal information
- Born: 2 October 1990 (age 36) Guernsey
- Height: 1.72 m (5 ft 8 in)
- Weight: 63 kg (139 lb; 9.9 st)

Cycling career
- Sport: Cycling
- Current team: Retired
- Discipline: Road
- Role: Rider; Team manager
- Rider type: Time trialist; Climber

Amateur teams
- 2005–2012: Guernsey Velo Club
- 2013: Sojasun-Espoir
- 2018: Guernsey Velo Club

Professional teams
- 2015: Madison Genesis
- 2016: Team Felbermayr–Simplon Wels
- 2017: Hrinkow Advarics Cycleang

Managerial team
- 2015–2019: Morgan Sharpe
Medal record
Representing Guernsey
Men's road cycling
Island Games
Silver medal – second place	2011 Isle of Wight	Time trial
Silver medal – second place	2011 Isle of Wight	Time trial team
Silver medal – second place	2011 Isle of Wight	Road race
Silver medal – second place	2011 Isle of Wight	Road race team

James McLaughlin (born 2 October 1990) is a Guernsey former road racing cyclist. He has been successful at Island Games and continental levels, also competing in the Commonwealth Games representing Guernsey.

McLaughlin placed 10th at the Commonwealth Games Time Trial in 2014 making him the highest placed rider not competing for a WorldTour team and earning him a professional contract with Madison Genesis the following year.

== Major results ==
2008
2nd Time trial, National Junior Road Championships
2011
Island Games

2nd Time trial
2nd Road race

5th Overall Cinturón a Mallorca
2014
5th Time trial, National Road Championships
10th Time trial, Commonwealth Games
2015
10th Chrono des Nations
10th Chrono Champenois
2016
4th GP Kranj
2018
6th Time trial, Commonwealth Games
