= 2013 Island Games =

International multi-sport event

- Host: Bermuda
- Teams: 22 islands
- Athletes: 1,127
- Events: 185 in 15 sports
- Opening: 13 July 2013
- Closing: 19 July 2013
- Opened by: Elizabeth II
- Main venue: National Stadium

The XV Island Games (also known as the 2013 NatWest Island Games for sponsorship reasons) were held in Bermuda from 13 to 19 July 2013. Bermuda was selected to host the Games by default after Prince Edward Island withdrew from the International Island Games Association.

It was the first time that the Games were held outside Europe.

== Participating islands ==
22 island entities of the IIGA from Europe, South Atlantic and the Caribbean area competed in these games. Rhodes and Sark declined invitations to the Games.

- Åland Islands (64)
- Alderney (6)
- Bermuda (Host) (100)
- Cayman Islands (69)
- Falkland Islands (49)
- Faroe Islands (84)
- Frøya (16)
- Gibraltar (75)
- Gotland (58)
- Greenland (74)
- Guernsey (100)
- Hitra (34)
- Isle of Man (85)
- Isle of Wight (30)
- Jersey (79)
- Menorca (33)
- Orkney (29)
- Saaremaa (43)
- Shetland Islands (46)
- (Saint Helena) St. Helena (8)
- Western Isles (22)
- (Anglesey) Ynys Môn (23)

== Sports ==
Numbers in parentheses indicate the number of medal events contested in each sport.

- Athletics (39)
- Badminton (6)
- Basketball (1)
- Cycling (13)
  - Mountain biking (3)
  - Road (4)
  - Time trial (4)
  - Town centre criterium (2)
- Football (2)
- Golf (4)
- Gymnastics (24)
- Sailboarding (2)
- Sailing (3)
- Shooting (30)
- Squash (6)
- Swimming (43)
- Tennis (7)
- Triathlon (4)
- Volleyball
  - Beach volleyball (2)
  - Indoor volleyball (2)

== Calendar ==
| OC | Opening ceremony | ● | Event competitions | 1 | Event finals | CC | Closing ceremony |

| July 2013 | 13th Sat | 14th Sun | 15th Mon | 16th Tue | 17th Wed | 18th Thu | 19th Fri | Gold medals |
|---|---|---|---|---|---|---|---|---|
| Ceremonies | OC | | | | | | CC | |
| Athletics | | | 9 | 7 | 6 | 6 | 11 | 39 |
| Badminton | | ● | 1 | ● | ● | ● | 5 | 6 |
| Basketball | | ● | | ● | | 1 | | 1 |
| Beach volleyball | | ● | ● | ● | 2 | | | 2 |
| Cycling | | 4 | 1 | 4 | 2 | 2 | | 13 |
| Football | | ● | ● | ● | ● | 2 | | 2 |
| Golf | | | ● | ● | ● | 4 | | 4 |
| Gymnastics | | 2 | | 12 | | 10 | | 24 |
| Sailboarding | | ● | ● | 2 | | | | 2 |
| Sailing | | ● | ● | ● | | ● | 3 | 3 |
| Shooting | | 6 | 5 | 4 | 5 | 3 | 1 | 30 |
| Squash | | ● | 2 | 3 | ● | ● | 1 | 6 |
| Swimming | | | 11 | 11 | 10 | 11 | | 43 |
| Tennis | | ● | 2 | ● | ● | ● | 5 | 7 |
| Triathlon | | 4 | | | | | | 4 |
| Volleyball | | ● | ● | ● | ● | ● | 2 | 2 |
| Total gold medals | | 16 | 31 | 43 | 25 | 39 | 28 | 188 |
| July 2013 | 13th Sat | 14th Sun | 15th Mon | 16th Tue | 17th Wed | 18th Thu | 19th Fri | Gold medals |

== Medal table ==
* Host nation (Bermuda)

| Rank | Nation | Gold | Silver | Bronze | Total |
|---|---|---|---|---|---|
| 1 | Isle of Man | 36 | 36 | 25 | 97 |
| 2 | Bermuda* | 27 | 19 | 31 | 77 |
| 3 | Jersey | 23 | 29 | 28 | 80 |
| 4 | Cayman Islands | 20 | 18 | 8 | 46 |
| 5 | Guernsey | 19 | 18 | 24 | 61 |
| 6 | Gotland | 18 | 6 | 8 | 32 |
| 7 | Faroe Islands | 10 | 12 | 14 | 36 |
| 8 | Saare County | 8 | 5 | 2 | 15 |
| 9 | Shetland | 5 | 8 | 3 | 16 |
| 10 | Menorca | 5 | 3 | 7 | 15 |
| 11 | Western Isles | 4 | 2 | 4 | 10 |
| 12 | Gibraltar | 3 | 5 | 8 | 16 |
| 13 | (Anglesey) Ynys Môn | 3 | 3 | 5 | 11 |
| 14 | Orkney | 1 | 4 | 1 | 6 |
| 15 | Åland | 1 | 3 | 9 | 13 |
| 16 | Greenland | 1 | 2 | 1 | 4 |
| 17 | Saint Helena | 1 | 2 | 0 | 3 |
| 18 | Isle of Wight | 0 | 3 | 0 | 3 |
| 19 | Hitra Municipality | 0 | 0 | 1 | 1 |
| 20 | Alderney | 0 | 0 | 0 | 0 |
| 20 | Falkland Islands | 0 | 0 | 0 | 0 |
| 20 | Frøya | 0 | 0 | 0 | 0 |
| Totals (22 entries) | | 185 | 178 | 179 | 542 |

Source: Final medal tally, from the official Medal Tally page.
