= Laura Wasley =

Manx cyclist

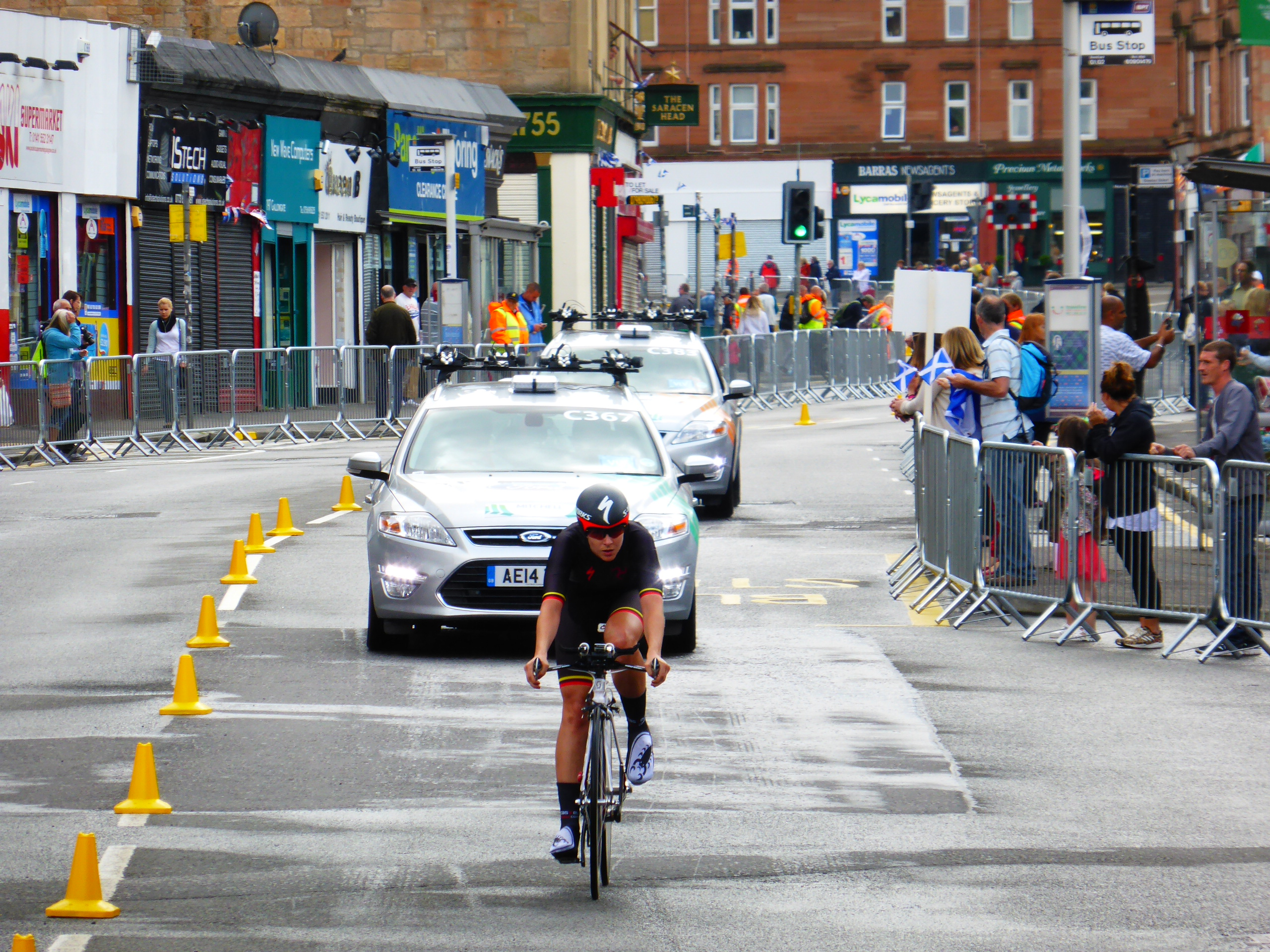
- Wasley at the 2014 Commonwealth Games

Personal information
- Born: 18 February 1984 (age 42) Douglas, Isle of Man
- Height: 1.69 m (5 ft 7 in)
- Weight: 59 kg (130 lb; 9.3 st)

Cycling career
- Sport: Cycling
- Discipline: Road
- Role: Rider
Medal record
Event	1st	2nd	3rd
Island Games	0	1	0
Representing Isle of Man

Laura Wasley (born 18 February 1984) is a Manx cyclist who has represented the Isle of Man at the 2011 Island Games and the 2014 Commonwealth Games. Wasley works as a civil servant.

== Career ==
Wasley competed for the Isle of Man at the 2011 Island Games on the Isle of Wight. She won a silver medal in the criterium race, and also came sixth in the time trial and eighth in the road race. In 2012, Wasley won a round of a time trial league; she raced for Team Manx Telecom. For the 2013 season, Wasley signed for the Scott Contessa Epic team, for whom she competed in the 2013 and 2014 British Road Championships riding. In 2013, she finished 28th of 31 competitors in the time trial, finishing outside the time limit in the road race, and in 2014, she did not finish the road race.

Wasley represented the Isle of Man at the 2014 Commonwealth Games in Glasgow. She did not finish the road race, and came 26th overall in the time trial. Prior to the Games, she was part of the Queen's Baton Relay when it visited the Isle of Man, and during the Games, Wasley had lunch with Queen Elizabeth II. Later in the year, she competed at the Tour of the Reservoir in Northumberland.
