= Ann Bowditch =

Guernsey cyclist

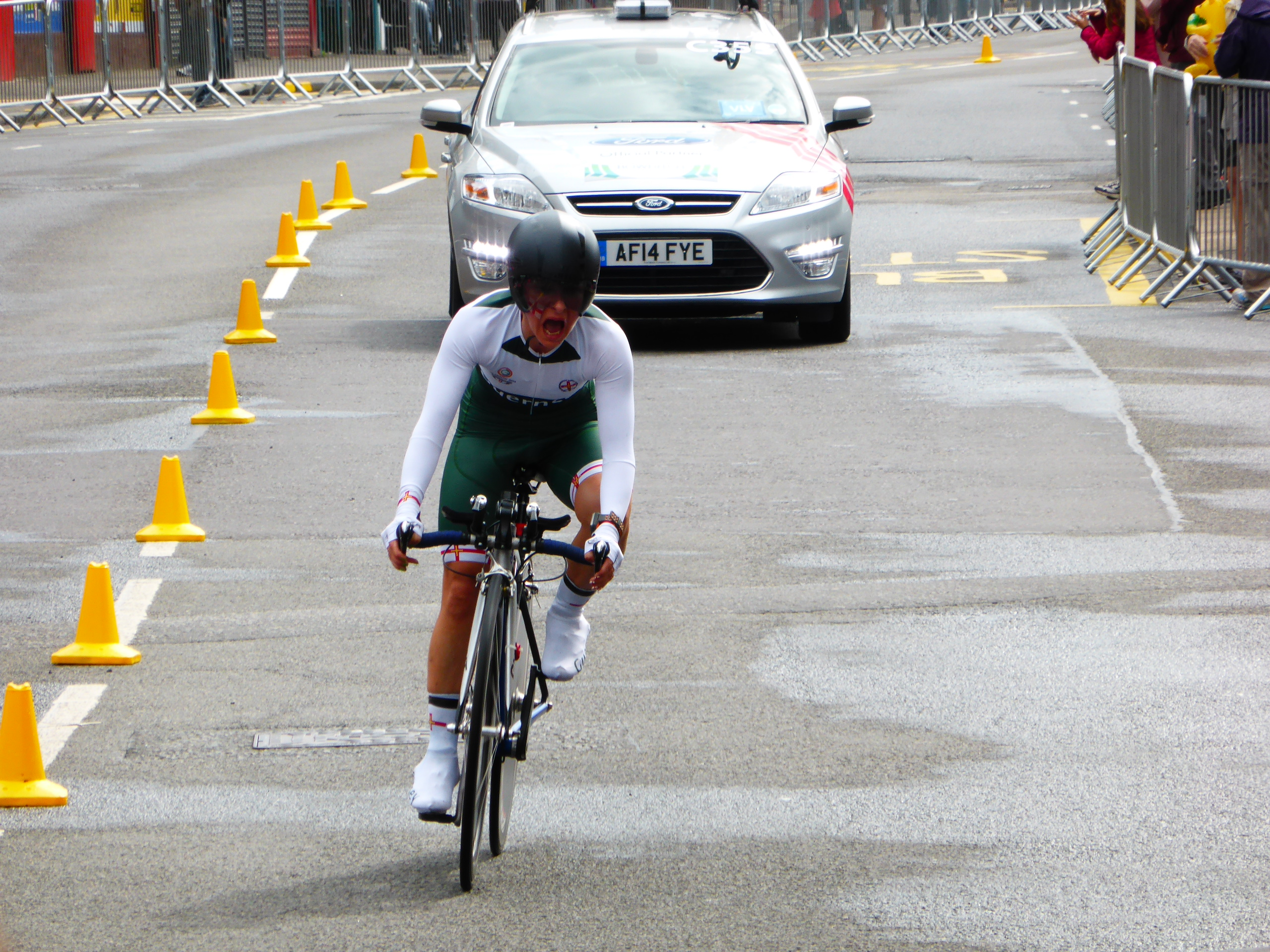
- Bowditch at the 2014 Commonwealth Games

Personal information
- Born: 21 January 1971 (age 55) Guernsey

Cycling career
- Sport: Cycling
- Discipline: Road cycling

Ann Bowditch is a road cyclist from Guernsey. She has represented Guernsey in three Commonwealth Games - 2002, 2010, 2014.

Ann won the British National Hillclimb Championship 3 times in 2004, 2005 and 2006.
