= Hong Kong National Bowls Championships =

National Lawn bowls event

Tournament information
- Sport: Lawn bowls
- Location: Hong Kong, China
- Established: 1909
- Administrator: Lawn Bowls Association of Hong Kong, China
- Website: HKLBA

The Hong Kong National Bowls Championships is organised by the Lawn Bowls Association of Hong Kong, China. The first National Championships was held in 1909 for the men's singles event.

== History ==
Bowls in Hong Kong started on the lawn of the 9 Knutsford Terrace in Kowloon in 1897. This led to the formation of the Kowloon Bowling Green Club. In 1908 an association was formed that was affiliated to the English Bowls Association but played to the rules of the Scottish Bowling Association. On 11 March 1961, the Hong Kong Lawn Bowls Association was formed. The HKLBA also organises the prestigious Hong Kong International Bowls Classic.

== Men's champions ==
Year	Singles	Pairs	Triples	Fours/Rinks
1909	S. Bell	n/a	n/a	n/a
1910	D. Gourlay	n/a	n/a	n/a
1911	G. R. Edwards	n/a	n/a	n/a
1912	W. Russell	n/a	n/a	n/a
1913	O. Russell	n/a	n/a	n/a
1914 to 1919 not held due to World War I
1920	J. Maclachlan	n/a	n/a	n/a
1921	J. Clark	n/a	n/a	n/a
1922	R. Wallace	n/a	n/a	n/a
1923	U. M. Omar	n/a	n/a	n/a
1924	G. Green	n/a	n/a	n/a
1925	F. Gullen	n/a	n/a	n/a
1926	A. Gourlay	n/a	n/a	n/a
1927	R. Laysley	n/a	n/a	n/a
1928	J. Ferguson	n/a	n/a	n/a
1929	R. F. da Luz	n/a	n/a	n/a
1930	A. M. Holland	n/a	n/a	n/a
1931	U. M. Omar	n/a	n/a	n/a
1932	L. A. Gutierrez	n/a	n/a	n/a
1933	A. Hyde-Lay	n/a	n/a	n/a
1934	A. W. Grimmitt	F. J. Jones, A. W. Grimmitt	n/a	n/a
1935	R. Duncan	M. J. Medina, J. Kavanagh	n/a	P.T.Farrell, R.Duncan, J.C.Brown, A.W.Holland
1936	A. E. Coates	R. Duncan, S. Randle	n/a	J.S.Landolt, A.S.Gomes, W.V.Field, R.F.da Luz
1937	U. M. Omar	M. Omar, U. M. Omar	n/a	J.R.Soares, J.W.Leonard, L.C.R.Souza, C.S.Rosselet
1938	B. W. Bradbury	C. M. Silva, F. X. Soares	n/a	A.F.Noronha, C.A.Lopes, J.E.Noronha, C.G.Silva
1939	U. M. Omar	F. V. V. Ribeiro, H. A. Alves	n/a	F.A.Machado, C.M.Silva, J.Ribeiro, F.X.M.Silva
1940	M. N. Rakusen	H. A. Alves, F. V. V. Ribeiro	n/a	R.Basa, A.E.Coates, J.S.Landolt, C.S.Rosselet
1941	A. M. Holland	S. R. Solina, K. M. Omar	n/a	L.Sykes, W.McNeill, R.Duncan, A.J.Hall
1942 to 1946 not held due to World War II
1947	J. S. Landolt	A. M. Omar, U. M. Omar	A. M. Omar, K. M. Omar, U. M. Omar	H.F.Shields, C.Dowman, S.Randle, A.J.Hall
1948	Jose da Luz	W. Hong Sling, A. M. Omar	n/a	I.M.Omar, K.M.Omar, A.M.Omar, U.M.Omar
1949	U. M. Omar	K. M. Rumjahn, S. M. Rumjahn	A. L. G. Eastman, W. C. Simpson, J. McKelvie	Augusto Pedro Pereira, J.H. Xavier, J.C. Remedios, C.C. Pereira
1950	C. C. Pereira	F. Lee, W. C. Ogley	J. Tindall, F. Greenwood, L. Sykes	E.Greenwood, A.L.G.Eastman, W.C.Simpson, L.Sykes
1951	W. Hong Sling	Jose da Luz, Raoul da Luz	K. M. Omar, A. M. Omar, U. M. Omar	I.M.Omar, K.M.Omar, A.M.Omar, U.M.Omar
1952	W. C. Simpson	Augusto Pedro Pereira, Jose da Luz	W. H. College, F. Howarth, W. H. Cowie	A.R.A. Rahman, K.M. Rumjahn, M.B. Hassan, U.A. Rumjahn
1953	M. B. Hassan Sr.	F. Lee, J. S. Landolt	J. Chubb, T. E. Baker, W. Hong Sling	S.Talford, A.M.Banks, A. Campbell, (sub.R, Gourlay), A.G. Coles
1954	A. H. Seemin	A. L. G. Eastman, W. C. Simpson	J. Cubb, T. E. Baker, W. Hong Sling	P.R. Ragi, F.O. Madar, F.R. Kermani, M.J. Divecha
1955	Eric Liddell	Jose da Luz, Raoul da Luz	G. Hong Choy, F. O. Madar, S. Leonard	L.M.S.Silva, G.Santos, R.Tay, P.K.Lau
1956	C. A. Coelho	A. H. Seemin, I. Ali	J. C. Fonseca, Augusto Pedro Pereira, C. C. Pereira	A.H.Seemin, A.R.Rahman, M.B.Hassan, O.R.Sadick
1957	Raoul da Luz	E. G. Barros, F. Lee	E. G. Barros, F. W. Hollands, C. R. Rosselet	R.C.Sales, S.A.Collaco, Augusto Pedro Pereira, C.C.Pereira
1958	F. R. Kermani	E. G. Barros, F. Lee	D. C. Symons, J. Chubb, T. E. Baker	J.M.Gutierrez, H.A.Ozorio, S.E.Souza, C.E.Passos
1959	George Souza Sr.	C. C. Pereira, Augusto Pedro Pereira	A. G. Skeoch, A. Lapsley, A. E. Eilliott	P.Manson, A.M.L.Soares, A.E.Coates, George Souza Sr.
1960	F. R. Kermani	A. M. Alves, A. A. Lopes	P. Hughes, T. Kavanagh, Eric Liddell	F.Lee, C.K.Sung, P.K.Lau, J.S.Landolt
1961	D. C. Symons	F. Lee, E. G. Barros	A. G. Skeoch, R. S. Gourlay, W. M. Davidson	R.L.Laurel, A.M.Omar, F.R Kermani, George Souza Sr.
1962	N. A. Beltrao	F. R. Kermani, D. J. Hunt	A. W. Lapsley, A. G. Skeoch, W. M. Davidson	A.Seemin, J.S.A.Curreem, M.B.Hassan Sr., S.Bucks
1963	Eduardo Maria Remedios	F. R. Kermani, Eric Liddell	A. W. Lapsley, A. G. Skeoch, A. E. Elliott	A.A.Crestejo, P.B.Gardner, Eduardo Maria Remedios, F.R.Kermani
1964	W. Hong Sling	W. Chambers, A. E. Elliott	R. Omar, I. Kitchell, A. M. Omar	M.A.Baptista, A.M.L.Soares, A.M.Alves, George Souza Sr.
1965	Augusto Pedro Pereira	C. M. Santos, Roberto da Silva	M. A. el Arculli, Oscar Adem, Omar Dallah	Oscar Adem, S.Yusuf, Omar Dallah, Abdul Kitchell
1966	A. W. Lapsley	S. Ramchand, A. W. Lapsley	George Souza Jr., P. Hughes, Eric Liddell	C.M.Santos, R.E.Heng, A.A.da Silva, Augusto Pedro Pereira
1967	W. Hong Sling	P. B. Gardner, Eduardo Maria Remedios	C. M. Santos, A. B. Marques, Eduardo Maria Remedios	N.Hart-Baker, P.Wood, K.Ball, T.Sanders
1968	Oscar Adem	Eduardo Maria Remedios, P. B. Gardner	H. Van Echten, F. Philips, J. Rigby	Ronald Raymond Girard, Eric Liddell, R.C. Girard, J.Sheedy
1969	Saco Delgado	Tso Hung, C. A. Coelho	A. M. Baptista, R. F. Pedruce, E. M. Rozario	Tso Hung, J.Lai, C.A.Coelho, M.Q.Wong
1970	N. Hart-Baker	L. Nutt, D. Weeks	A. M. Santos, J. Lai, Eduardo Maria Remedios	George Souza Jr., P.R.Ragi, A.M.Alves, George Souza Sr.
1971	Eric Liddell	B. Manchester, R. Bone	A. Wallwork, F. Kavanagh, J. Thorpe	R.Bucks, T.Choy, S.Bucks, Eduardo Maria Remedios
1972	Oscar Adem	Saco Delgado, A. A. Lopes	A. H. Seemin, P. Mak, George Souza Jr.	D. Davenport, E.M. Rozario, C.S. Dang, P.K. Yip
1973	Saco Delgado	George Souza Jr., George Souza Sr.	Tso Hung, W. Ogley, C. A. Coelho	C.M. Santos, A.A. da Silva, C.A. Figueiredo, Roberto da Silva
1974	M. B. Hassan Jr.	C. M. Santos, Roberto da Silva	J. Tso, David Tso, Oscar Adem	G.Collopy, Y.Y.Chung, R.Russell, F.W.Hollands
1975	A. A. Lopes	Saco Delgado, A. A. Lopes	G. McTavish, A. Fisher, R. C. Girard	R.Williamson, S.Bucks, A.B.Marques, Eduardo Maria Remedios
1976	George Yam	P. Hogg, B. Douglass	P. Souza, A. Alves, George Souza Sr.	P.Smith, L.Hewa, G.Howlett, C.S.Dang
1977	George Yam	A. M. Alves, George Souza Jr.	George Souza Sr., A. Dibble, A. M. Alves	M.Morris, B.Kelly, H.Bennett, H.Ridsdale
1978	Philip Chok	Abdul Kitchell, Omar Dallah	F. Kermani, A. Alves, G. A Souza	Ray Dewhurst, D. Howe, G. Birtles, K.J. Bosley
1979	George Souza Jr.	M. F. Koo, M. H. Kan	M. H. Kan, Oscar Adem, R. Tay	M.F.Kee, C.Carillo, R.Tay, George Souza Jr.
1980	G. Dang	J. Armitage, P. O'Dea, L. D'Souza	K. A. Yuen, David Tso, George Souza Jr.	L.Elves (K.Bosley), D.Howe, B.Edwards, J.McAffrey
1981	David Tso	P.F. Smith, Eduardo Maria Remedios	F. Carvalho, C. Antunes, E. M. Rozario	T.Rozario, G.Roazrio, G.L.Souza, Roberto da Silva
1982	George Souza Jr.	Bill McMahon, D. Overman	Philip Chok, Edwin Chok, George Souza Jr.	P.S.Hui, J.Collaco, M.Randall, C.Coelho
1983	Edwin Chok	Edwin Chok, Philip Chok	Philip Chok, Edwin Chok, George Souza Jr.	P.Tsao, A.Swift, L.Hewa, D.Davenport
1984	C. S. Dang	G. Chan, R. Au	Larry Parker, G. Young, D. Overman	George Yam, Ian Ho, S.Y.Mong, C.S.Dang
1985	Mark McMahon	J. Armitage, Ken Wallis	S. Lau, J. Wong, George Souza Jr.	M.M. Hassan, Slawee Kadir, S.M. Hassan, B.M. Hassan
1986	George Souza Jr.	Noel Kennedy, Danny Ho	S. Lau, J. Wong, George Souza Jr.	P.Cheung, S.Lau, J.Wong, George Souza Jr.
1987	Noel Kennedy	T. Chok, Philip Chok	P. Mak, C.C. Chen, David Tso	P.Cheung, S.Lau, J.Wong, George Souza Jr.
1988	George Souza Jr.	L. Mitchell, T. Blair	S. Mak, N. Tso, J. Wong	P.Cheung, S.Lau, J.Wong, George Souza Jr.
1989	Ian Ho	Ian Ho, Mark McMahon	S. Mak, N. Tso, J. Wong	K.T.Wong, T.W.Mak, R.Chin, R.Au
1990	George Souza Jr.	Mel Stewart, Ken Wallis	A. A. Da Luz, B. Wong, T. Rozario	P.Cheung, T.Chok, David Tso, George Souza Jr.
1991	Tommy Rozario	E. Chan, J. Wong	J. Tso, G. Chan, W. Ho	P.Cheung, T.Chok, David Tso, George Souza Jr.
1992	George Souza Jr.	Mel Stewart, Ken Wallis	P. Tsao, D. Ho, I. Ho	M.Hassan, Slawee Kadir, S.Hassan, B.M.Hassan
1993	Ken Wallis	Mark McMahon, Bill McMahon	A. Lo, Dawood Karamdin, W. Ho	M. Hassan, Slawee Kadir, S. Hassan, B.M. Hassan
1994	Bill McMahon	M. Chow, R. Au	D. Tau, M. Wu, George Souza Jr.	D. McManus, T. Rozario, J.Burt, Bill McMahon
1995	Tony Abraham	Willie Lai, Danny Ho	Mel Stewart, Ken Wallis, Danny Ho	Adam Poynton, Harry Thornton, Anthony Carstairs, Noel Kennedy
1996	Anthony Carstairs	Mel Stewart, Ken Wallis	Mel Stewart, Ken Wallis, D. Ho	P.Chan, R.Chin, Tony Tong, Bill McMahon
1997	Jacky Wong	Willie Lai, Jacky Wong	S. Lau, A. Fan, Jacky Wong	P.Chan, R.Chin, Tony Tong, Bill McMahon
1998	Noel Kennedy	J. Melbourne, Ken Wallis	P. Chan, David Tso, Bill McMahon	P. Fong, K.T. Fung, V. Cheung, Jacky Wong
1999	A. Fernandes	Anthony Carstairs, Noel Kennedy	Adam Poynton, Anthony Carstairs, Noel Kennedy	D.Leung, P.Ng, S.Cheung, Y.K.Ha
2000	Tony Tong	Anthony Carstairs, Noel Kennedy	R. Au, G. Ma, F. Cheng	Adam Poynton, Harry Thornton, Anthony Carstairs, Noel Kennedy
2001	Jimmy Chiu	Anthony Carstairs, Noel Kennedy	K. K. Yeung, Nelson To, James Cheng	E.Curlewis, C.Imeson, Jimmy Chiu, Loy D'Souza
2002	Adam Poynton	Adam Poynton, Noel Kennedy, Heron Lau	L. Fernandes, K.K. Au, A. Fernandes	C.C. Ip, C.H. Heung, S.K. Ng, K.Kadir
2003	Noel Kennedy	Adam Poynton, Noel Kennedy	James Keung, Jimmy Chiu, James Cheng	Y.S. Leung, Pat Lai, James Keung, D. Ho
2004	Adam Poynton	Robin Chok, Jacky Wong	Ken Chan, Jerry Ng, Noel Kennedy	C.P. So, R. Ho, M. Chow, C.Y. Yu
2005	James Cheng	H. Wai, Suen Chi Sing	Jacky Wong, T. Chok, S. Lau	Noel Kennedy, Ken Chan, Jerry Ng, Lee Ka Hon
2006	Jimmy Chiu	B. Mehta, K. K. Yeung	Jimmy Chiu, Chadwick Chen, K. K. Yeung	B.Leung, T.Chiu, Heron Lau, J.Cheng
2007	Noel Kennedy	Ken Chan, Noel Kennedy	Ken Chan, Jerry Ng, Noel Kennedy	Y.S. Leung, K.H. Wong, C.T. Wong, S.K. Ng
2008	James Keung	K. L. Cheung, Kenny Ng	Ken Chan, Jerry Ng, Noel Kennedy	Lee Ka Hon, Ken Chan, Jerry Ng, Jordi Lo
2009	Heron Lau	Tony Chan, Colin Nam	Jerry Ng, Alex Ng, Ken Chan	Paul Sze, Andy Chan, Nelson To, Milo Lai
2010	Li Ming Sum	Robin Chok, Jimmy Chiu	Jerry Ng, Alex Ng, Ken Chan	Bernard Leung, Lee Ka Hon, Heron Lau, James Cheng
2011	Stanley Lai	Ken Chan, Jerry Ng	Eddie Tang, Chung Ming Sang, Peter Li	Leung Chun Wo, Tommy Chui, C.P. So, C.Y. Yu
2012	Ken Chan	Tony Cheung, Heron Lau	Jimmy Tam, John Ng, Kevin Fung	Wong Chun Yat, Raymond Ho, Heron Lau, Ko Ha Lee
2013	Ken Chan	Ken Chan, Noel Kennedy	Chan Wah, Theodore Li, Edward Cheng	Kenny Tam, C.T. Wong, Terry Kung, S.K. Ng
2014	Stanley Lai	Terence Lee, Wong Chun Yat	Bernard Leung, Timmy Kwong, Danny Ho	Jason Tsang, Alan Yuen, Kevin Chan, Jason Choi
2015	Ken Chan	Jordi Lo, Wong Chun Yat	Jerry Ng, Noel Kennedy, Ken Chan	Imen Tang, Simpson Chang, Jordi Lo, David Tso
2016	Chadwick Chen	Imen Tang, Stanley Lai	Martin Sham, Kenneth Fung, Tony Cheung	Tsang Man Lung, Adrian Yau, James Po, Jason Choi
2017	Tony Cheung	Albert Lo, Robin Chok	Peter Lau, Milo Lai, Dave Hanson	Imen Tang, Martin Sham, Jordi Lo, Liu Chin Hong
2018	Tony Cheung	Jerry Ng, Arthur Lam	Tony Chok, John Fung, Howard Poon	Imen Tang, Martin Sham, Jordi Lo, Liu Chin Hong
2019	Imen Tang	Bosco Li, Ken Chan	Chun Yat Wong, Ko Ha Lee, Ken Chan	Warren Cheung, Ian Yau, Suen Chi Sing, Patrick Choi
2020	Kenny Tam	Ken Chan, Ko Ha Lee	Ka Ki Ng, Paul Lee Ngan Ho, T.P. Choi	Bronson Fung, Chun Yat Wong, Ko Ha Lee, Ken Chan
2021	Warren Cheung	Chris Chow, Kenny So	Bosco Li, Jerry Ng, Arthur Lam	Edmond Chan, Patrick Choi, Warren Cheung, Y.S.Leung
2022	Ko Ha Lee	Howard Poon, Ko Ha Lee	Ko Ha Lee, Howard Poon, Imen Tang	Boota Singh, Peter KW Chan, George Law, James Cheng
2023	Jerry Ng	James Po, Kevin Fung	Lui Chin Hong, C Y Yu, O B Adem	Lyndon Sham, Longinus Ha, Anthony Yip, Kenny Tam
2024	Ko Ha Lee	Tony Cheung, Danny Ho	Kenneth Fung, Terry Kung, Stephen Sy	Stephen Sy, James Po, Heron Lau, Adrian Yau

== Women's champions ==
Year	Singles	Pairs	Triples	Fours/Rinks
1968	Selina Silva	S. Silva, J. Remedios	H. Kwong, A. Remedios, B. Silva	n/a
1969	Jo Hollis	M. Ma, I. Souza	J. Skeoch, S. Skeoch, J. Banks	n/a
1970	Selina Silva	M. Ma, I. Souza	M. Ma, I. Souza, S. Silva	n/a
1972	Eve Scott	Elvie Chok, B. Silva	B. Silva, A. Remedios, Elvie Chok	n/a
1973	Selina Silva	Naty Rozario, Lena Sadick	B. Silva, A. Remedios, Elvie Chok	I. Souza, Irene Silva, S. Silva, Helen Wong
1974	Helen Wong	A. Remedios, I. Souza	M. Smither, Marie Ribeiro Ramchand, J. Banks	P. Sung, Irene Silva, S. Silva, Helen Wong
1975	Elvie Chok	B. Silva, Jo Hollis	C. Smith, E. Scott, B. Silker	Naty Rozario, Linda Serodia, H. Xavier, M. Rozario
1976	Lena Sadick	M. Azevedo, Elvie Chok	I. Hughes, Elvie Chok, Helen Wong	Naty Rozario, Linda Serodia, H. Xavier, M. Rozario
1977	Sandra Zakoske	I. Hughes, Lena Sadick	Rae O'Donnell, F. Woods, Lena Sadick	Naty Rozario, Linda Serodia, H. Xavier, M. Rozario
1978	Helen Wong	A. Remedios, M. Rozario	M. Lambert, Lena Sadick, Helen Wong	B. Silva, A. Remedios, Irene Silva, Helen Wong
1979	Maisie Azevedo	V. Cheung, Helen Wong	M. Walker, M. Reynolds, M. Adair	M. Abbas, Dorothy Hughes, Marie Ribeiro Ramchand, Lena Sadick
1980	Helen Wong	M. Cawley, M. Walker	V. Cheung, Lena Sadick, Helen Wong	H. Corley, E. Giles, B. Howell, Rae O'Donnell
1981	Bea Silva	C. McCarthy, I. Kennedy	V. Cheung, H. Karamdin, P. Sung	Naty Rozario, V. Cheung, Irene Silva, Helen Wong
1982	Lena Sadick	B. Silva, M. Azevedo	Linda King, Irene Silva, Helen Wong	Naty Rozario, V. Cheung, Irene Silva, Helen Wong
1983	Marie Cawley	Joan Humphreys, Lena Sadick	C. Smith, C. McCarthy, I. Kennedy	B. Silva, Joan Humphreys, Rosemary McMahon, Lena Sadick
1984	Haruko Corley	Linda King, Elvie Chok	P. Hussain, P. Hussain, Joan Humphreys	B. Silva, Joan Humphreys, Rosemary McMahon, Lena Sadick
1985	Joan Humphreys	E. Giles, Rae O'Donnell	H. Hayes, J. Jarvis, L. Walton	Nora Wu, Joan Humphreys, Rae O'Donnell, Helen Wong
1986	Lena Sadick	P. Simpson, F. Tuft	Linda King, Helen Wong, Lena Sadick	L. Brindle, D. Poynton, M. O'Reilly, F. Tuft
1987	Joan Humphreys	E. Giles, Rae O'Donnell	Angela Chau, Naty Rozario, Lena Sadick	Angela Chau, Naty Rozario, H. Xavier, Lena Sadick
1988	Linda Smith	Rosemary McMahon, W. Overman	Angela Chau, Naty Rozario, Lena Sadick	Portia Lau, L. Hassan, Linda Serodia, J. Wong
1989	Rosemary McMahon	Rita Chan, J. Law	Portia Lau, I. Kennedy, Sandra Zakoske	S. Au, G. Chu, O.K. Lee, G. Mak
1990	Linda Smith	M. Fitzgerald, B. Dick	Eva Ho, Jenny Wallis, Rae O'Donnell	Eva Ho, Jo Hollis, Jenny Wallis, Rae O'Donnell
1991	Rae O'Donnell	Angela Chau, L. Yeung	Eva Ho, Jenny Wallis, Rae O'Donnell	Eva Ho, Jo Hollis, Jenny Wallis, Rae O'Donnell
1992	Lena Yeung	H. Noronha, S. Yau	S. Lo, Angela Chau, L. Yeung	H. Noronha, S. Yau, Angela Chau, L. Yeung
1993	Noelene Hill	Jenny Wallis, Rae O'Donnell	M. Scott, H. Young, Rosemary McMahon	S. Lo, M. Siqueira, L. Da Luz, J. Wong
1994	Rosemary McMahon	S. Wong, Elizabeth Li	M. Siqueira, L. Da Luz, J. Wong	Rita Chan, S. Wong, Grace Chu, E. Mak
1995	Stella Lo	J. Lo, W. Wan	S. Lo, Alice Antunes, Fanny Fernandes	L. Yeung, Angela Chau, Anna Clarke, Elizabeth Li
1996	Lena Yeung	L. da Luz, J. Wong	J. Law, J. Luk, Stephanie Chung	L. Yeung, Angela Chau, Anna Clarke, Elizabeth Li
1997	Danna Chiu	J. Brennan, Rosemary McMahon	E. Wong, W. Wong, Stephanie Chung	L. Yeung, Angela Chau, Anna Clarke, Elizabeth Li
1998	Jenny Wallis	Danna Chiu, J. Nam	S.L. Siu, L. da Luz, Julia Wong	J. Lam, C. Sheck, J. Luk, G. Rahman
1999	Angela Chau	Angela Chau, L. Yeung	C. Wu, R. Wong, W. Luk	Angela Chau, E. Hui, H. Lai, L. Yeung
2000	Anna Chan	Angela Chau, L. Yeung	Julia Wong, L. da Luz, H. Lai	Fanny Fernandes, Alice Antunes, R. Wong, H. Noronha
2001	Lena Yeung	Danna Chiu, J. Nam	L. Yeung, Anna Clarke, Angela Chau	Anna Clarke, H. Ha, J. Law, C. Wong
2002	Angela Chau	M Lai, Q. Lai	L. Yeung, Anna Clarke, Angela Chau	L. Yeung, Anna Clarke, Ho Fong, Angela Chau
Official National Championship
2001	Stephanie Chung	Grace Chu, H. Ha	H. Ko, W. Wai, Stephanie Chung	Grace Chu, H. Wee, Camilla Leung, H. Ha
2002	Winnie Wai	J. Nam, Danna Chiu	GGrace Chu, Camilla Leung, H. Ha	A. Chan, M. Ho, S. Karamdin, Danna Chiu
2003	Grace Chu	F. Lau, W. Wan	Grace Chu, Camilla Leung, H. Ha	Angela Chau, F. Ho, R. Wong, L. Yeung
2004	Queenie Lai	Elizabeth Li, Camilla Leung	L. Da Luz, Alice Antunes, Fanny Fernandes	Grace Chu, C. Leung, H. Ha, Elizabeth Li
2005	Rita Shek	D. Leung, Wanis Sze	Camilla Leung, Elizabeth Li, Grace Chu	Grace Chu, S. Ou, Camilla Leung, Elizabeth Li
2006	Winnie Wai	C. Suen, Linda Robertson	Q. Lai, P. Ma, Elizabeth Li	Q. Lai, L. Lai, M. Lai, D. Ng
2007	Camilla Leung	S. Lee, L. Pek	Winnie Wai, P. Ma, E. Cormack	C. Suen, S. Chan, V. Ngai, S. Karamdin
2008	Camilla Leung	Grace Chu, Rita Shek	Rita Au Yeung, W. M. Chan, Jessie So	Camilla Leung, Alice Antunes, Linda Da Luz, Erica Wong
2009	Peggy Ma	Angela Chau, Hannah Ha	Anna Chan, Joanna Nam, Danna Chiu	Shirley Ma, Liza Poon, Joanna Nam, Danna Chiu
2010	Grace Chu	Tammy Tham, Wanis Sze	Flora Wong, Rosa Mok, Alice Lee	Phyllis Wong, Carmen Suen, Winnie Wai, Fanny Fernandes
2011	Mercredi Yeung	Winnie Wai, Fanny Fernandes	P.Y. Chan, Flora Wong, Rosa Mok, Alice Lee	Michelle Cheng, Lily Chan, Annie Yeung, Linda Robertson
2012	Elisa Cheung	Anne Gately, Emmie Wong	Amy Wong, Florence Lau, Sanlia Wong	Iris Cheung, Daisy Mcine, Dorothy Yu, Connie Wong
2013	Anna Chan	Esther Yu, Eva Hui	Rita Tong, Janet Ferreira, Celena Kwok	Rita Tsui, Priscilla Lam, Grace Chu, Hannah Ha
2014	Dorothy Yu	Rita Tsui, Tammy Tham	Phyllis Wong, Shirley Ma, Camilla Leung	Cindy Lau, Susana Shea, Camilla Leung, Elisa Cheung
2015	Tammy Tham	Rita Shek, Wanis Sze	May Poon, Flora Ni, Priscilla Lam	Candy Ng, Rita Tsui, Tammy Tham, Angela Chau
2016	Dorothy Yu	Stella Lo, Lee Wong	Rita Tsui, Mercredi Yeung, Tammy Tham	Shadow Law, Jenny Miu, Daphne Leung, Joanna Nam
2017	Shirley Ko	Angel So, Andrea Chan	Daisy Kwok, Florence Lau, Sanlia Wong	Fiona Ng, Cheryl Chan, Eva Hui, Esther T.H. Yu
2018	Helen Cheung	Dorothy Yu, Vivian Yip	Shirley Ma, Phyllis Wong, Grace Chu	Josephine Lam, Connie Chung, Rita Shek, Wanis Sze
2019	Camilla Leung	Dorothy Yu, Vivian Yip	B. Wong, P. Chiu, R. Ng	Phoebe Ho, Priscilla Lam, Lydia Yan, Camilla Leung
2020	Helen Cheung	J. Cheung, M. Ip	Audrey Lai, Abbie Chan, Gloria Ha	Susanna Lo, Cindy Lau, Ada Lai, Helen Cheung
2021	Andrea Leung	Christina Chung, Eva Kwok	Christina Yeung, Phoebe Ho, Camilla Leung	Grace Chu, May Poon, Shirley Ma, Phyllis Wong
2022	Gloria Ha	Irene Chow, Alice Chan	Rita Shek, Honor Siu, Christina Yeung	Allyson Ko, Valerie Lau, Letty Chan, Elisa Cheung
2023	Gloria Ha	Cora Ng, Kristin Salvador	Audrey Han, Daphne Leung, Jenny Miu	Cheryl Chan, Erica Leung, Alice Lee, Esther Yu
2024	Gloria Ha	Angel So, Andrea Chan	Mable Chan, Tammy Tham, Helen Cheung	Rita Shek, Eva Yu, Yu Yee Sin, Gloria Ha
