= Omar Dallah =

Hong Kong field hockey player

Personal information
- Nationality: Hong Kong
- Born: 12 August 1936
- Died: 1997
Medal record
Representing Hong Kong
Commonwealth Games
Gold medal – first place	1978 Edmonton	men's fours
World Outdoor Championships
Gold medal – first place	1980 Melbourne	men's fours

Omar Kachong Dallah (12 August 1936 – 1997) was a Hong Kong international lawn and indoor bowler and field hockey international. Appearing as a member of Hong Kong's 1964 Olympics hockey team, he later became the national team's captain and then coach. As a men's fours bowler, he and his teammates won gold in the 1978 Edmonton Commonwealth Games, and 1980 Melbourne World Outdoor Championships.

== Biography ==
=== Hockey ===
Dallah represented Hong Kong in hockey at the 1962 Asian Games, the 1964 Tokyo Olympic Games, and (as captain) in the 1966 Asian Games. He coached Hong Kong's national team, including for the 1970 and 1978 Asian Games, both in Bangkok.

=== Bowls ===
Dallah won a gold medal in the fours as skip (captain) at both the 1978 Commonwealth Games in Edmonton (with Philip Chok, M. B. Hassan Jr., and Roberto da Silva), and the 1980 World Outdoor Bowls Championship in Melbourne (with Hassan Jr., George Souza Jr., and Eric Liddell). Besides these major events, Dallah also won a few other international invitation tournaments.

Dallah went on to represent Hong Kong in the 1984 World Bowls Championship at Aberdeen, Scotland where he also skipped the team and just lost out on a fours bronze medal after being defeated by Scotland 30–15 in the play off.

Other representative bowls appearances included the Commonwealth Games in 1974 (Christchurch), and 1982 (Brisbane); the World Bowls Championships in 1976 (Johannesburg) and 1980 (Frankston); the Mazda Jack High International Invitation Singles 1981 in Victoria, Australia; the Rest Of The World Team tour of the British Isles in 1980; the Kodak Masters Invitation UK in 1981; and the Sydney International Masters Invitation in 1983.

Dallah was one of the founders of the Hong Kong International Bowls Classic along with Philip Chok and Geoff Murphy (the former president of the HK Lawn Bowls Association). His home club in Hong Kong was the Indian Recreation Club, which was situated adjacent to the Hong Kong Stadium.

=== Personal life ===
Dallah was educated at St. Joseph's College in Hong Kong. He joined the Hong Kong Civil Service in the late 1950s, rising through the ranks from Office Assistant / Clerk to Principal Executive Officer. He retired in 1983, and moved with his family to Sydney, Australia.

He also played a major role in the establishment of the O. R. Sadick Islamic Centre located at Wan Chai.

Dallah died in March, 1997. He was aged 60.
