= David McGill (bowls) =

Scottish lawn and indoor bowler and commentator (1947–2022)

Personal information
- Nationality: British (Scottish)
- Born: 1947 Edinburgh, Scotland
- Died: 21 January 2022 (aged 74) Edinburgh, Scotland

Sport
- Sport: Lawn bowls
- Club: Sighthill BC / Braid BC
Medal record
Representing Scotland
World Outdoor Championships
Silver medal – second place	1980 Melbourne	triples
Bronze medal – third place	1980 Melbourne	singles
Bronze medal – third place	1980 Melbourne	team
British Isles Championships
Gold medal – first place	1977	singles

David McGill (1947 – 21 January 2022) was a Scottish international lawn and indoor bowler and commentator.

== Bowls career ==
=== World Championship ===
McGill won a silver medal in the triples with John Summers and Willie McQueen and two bronze medals in the singles and team event (Leonard Trophy) at the 1980 World Outdoor Bowls Championship in Melbourne.

=== Commonwealth Games ===
In 1978 MGill represented Scotland in the singles at the Commonwealth Games.

=== National ===
McGill was a member of the Sighthill Bowls Club and was the 1976 national champion and subsequently won the singles at the British Isles Bowls Championships in 1977.

== Commentating ==
He was an architect by trade and has also commentated for the BBC in televised bowls competitions.
