= Hong Kong International Bowls Classic =

International lawn bowls event

- Sport: Bowls
- Founded: 1981

The Hong Kong International Bowls Classic is a highly prestigious event in the lawn bowls calendar. It began as a men's pairs competition in 1981, with a men's singles event added in 1983. In 2008, the program was expanded to include singles and pairs competitions for women.

The event was cancelled in 2019 due to the 2019–20 Hong Kong protests and the 2020 and 2021 editions were cancelled due to the COVID-19 pandemic.

== Men's Finalists ==
Year	Singles		Pairs		Ref
Year	Winner	Finalist	Winner	Finalist	Ref
1981	no singles event held		(Australia) Rob Dobbins (Australia) Darby Ross	(England) Jimmy Hobday (England) Tony Allcock	
1983	(New Zealand) Peter Belliss	(England) John Bell	(Hong Kong) Philip Chok (Hong Kong) George Souza Jr.	(New Zealand) Peter Belliss (New Zealand) Phil Skoglund	
1984	(Hong Kong) George Souza Jr.	(England) John Bell	(Hong Kong) Philip Chok (Hong Kong) George Souza Jr.	(Australia) Denis Dalton (Australia) Dennis Katunarich	
1985	(Scotland) George Adrain	(Israel) Cecil Bransky	(Scotland) Willie Wood (Scotland) George Adrain	(Australia) Denis Dalton (Australia) Ken Williams	
1986	(Australia) Paul Richards	(Australia) Bob Fishlock	(Scotland) Willie Wood (Scotland) George Adrain	(New Zealand) Rowan Brassey (New Zealand) Peter Belliss	
1987	(Australia) Paul Richards	(Hong Kong) Noel Kennedy	(Scotland) Brian Middlemass (Scotland) Richard Corsie	(Northern Ireland) Willie Watson (Northern Ireland) Ernie Parkinson	
1988	(Scotland) Richard Corsie	(Australia) Barry Salter	(Hong Kong) Noel Kennedy (Hong Kong) Mark McMahon	(England) Brett Morley (England) John Bell	
1989	(New Zealand) Peter Belliss	(Australia) Trevor Morris	(Australia) Rex Johnston (Australia) Trevor Morris	(England) Brett Morley (England) Ron Gass	
1990	(Scotland) Graham Robertson	(England) Wynne Richards	(Scotland) Graham Robertson (Scotland) Alex Marshall	(Hong Kong) David Tso (Hong Kong) George Souza Jr.	
1993	(Scotland) Graham Robertson	(Israel) Cecil Bransky	(Israel) Jeff Rabkin (Israel) Cecil Bransky	(South Africa) Kevin Campbell (South Africa) Ashley van Winkel	
1994	(Hong Kong) Noel Kennedy	(Canada) Bill Boettger	(Hong Kong) David Tso (Hong Kong) George Souza Jr.	(South Africa) Donny Piketh (South Africa) Neil Burkett	
1995	(Northern Ireland) Noel Graham	(South Africa) Neil Burkett	(Scotland) Kenny Logan (Scotland) Alex Marshall	(South Africa) Donny Piketh (South Africa) Neil Burkett	
1996	(Australia) John Noonan	(South Africa) Gerry Baker	(South Africa) Gerry Baker (South Africa) Neil Burkett	(New Zealand) Andrew Curtain (New Zealand) David File	
1997	(Australia) Adam Jeffery	(Jersey) David Le Marquand	(England) Stuart Airey (England) Andrew Wills	(South Africa) Gerry Baker (South Africa) Neil Burkett	
1998	(Australia) Adam Jeffery	(Hong Kong) Willie Lai	(England) Stuart Airey (England) Andrew Wills	(Wales) Jason Greenslade (Wales) Robert Price	
1999	(Australia) Adam Jeffery	(Hong Kong) Noel Kennedy	(Northern Ireland) Noel Graham (Northern Ireland) Jonathan Ross	(Wales) David Harding (Wales) Andrew Fleming	
2000	(Scotland) George Sneddon	(New Zealand) Peter Belliss	(Northern Ireland) Noel Graham (Northern Ireland) Jonathan Ross	(South Africa) Bobby Donnelly (South Africa) Neil Burkett	
2001	(Wales) Jason Greenslade	(South Africa) Neil Burkett	(Scotland) George Sneddon (Scotland) Alex Marshall	(Wales) Jason Greenslade (Wales) Robert Jones	
2002	(Scotland) David Peacock	(Scotland) George Sneddon	(New Zealand) Russell Meyer (New Zealand) Paul Girdler	(Australia) Tom Ellem (Australia) Kelvin Kerkow	
2004	(England) Mark Walton	(South Africa) Eric Johannes	(England) Mark Walton (England) Graham Shadwell	(Northern Ireland) Jim Baker (Northern Ireland) Noel Graham	
2005	(New Zealand) Paul Girdler	(Hong Kong) Heron Lau	(Northern Ireland) Noel Graham (Northern Ireland) Jonathan Ross	(Hong Kong) K H Lee (Hong Kong) Ken Chan	
2006	(Northern Ireland) Jeremy Henry	(Scotland) Wayne Hogg	(South Africa) Neil Burkett (South Africa) Wayne Perry	(Northern Ireland) Paul Daly (Northern Ireland) Jeremy Henry	
2007	(New Zealand) Mark Watt	(England) Mervyn King	(Hong Kong) Ken Chan (Hong Kong) Noel Kennedy	(Wales) Mark Harding (Wales) Stephen Harris	
2008	(England) Mark Walton	(Australia) Leif Selby	(England) Mark Walton (England) Graham Shadwell	(Hong Kong) Chadwick Chen (Hong Kong) Jimmy Chiu	
2009	(Australia) Leif Selby	(Philippines) Hommer Mercado	(New Zealand) Andrew Kelly (New Zealand) Richard Collett	(Malaysia) Safuan Said (Malaysia) Fairul Izwan Abd Muin	
2010	(England) Robert Newman	(New Zealand) Andrew Kelly	(England) Sam Tolchard (England) Robert Newman	(Scotland) Robert Marshall (Scotland) Iain McLean	
2012	(Australia) Barrie Lester	(Australia) Matthew Baus	(Australia) Barrie Lester (Australia) Matthew Baus	(Northern Ireland) Graham McKee (Northern Ireland) Mark McPeak	
2013	(England) Richard Catton	(Hong Kong) Stanley Lai	(Scotland) Iain McLean (Scotland) Robert Grant	(New Zealand) Dan Delany (New Zealand) Richard Girvan	
2014	(Scotland) Robert Grant	(Malaysia) Muhammad Hizlee Abdul Rais	(Philippines) Christopher Dagpin (Philippines) Angelo Morales	(Australia) Mathew Pietersen (Australia) Matthew Baus	
2015	(Hong Kong) Jordi Lo	(Northern Ireland) Andrew Duncan	(Australia) Nathan Pedersen (Australia) Corey Wedlock	(Wales) Marc Wyatt (Wales) Robert Weale	
2016	(England) David Bolt	(Wales) David Kingdon	(Australia) Nathan Pedersen (Australia) Corey Wedlock	(Scotland) Kevin Anderson (Scotland) Ryan Burnett	
2017	(Australia) Jesse Noronha	(Scotland) John Fleming	(Australia) Jesse Noronha (Australia) Ben Twist	(England) David Bolt (England) Taylor Monk	
2018	(Australia) Ben Twist	(Northern Ireland) Aaron Tennant	(Northern Ireland) Aaron Tennant (Northern Ireland) Ian McClure	(Philippines) Curte Guarin (Philippines) Angelo Morales	
2019 cancelled due to the 2019–20 Hong Kong protests. 2020 to 2022 cancelled due to COVID-19 pandemic.					
2023	Mark Wilson	(Malaysia) Izzat Dzulkeple	(Malaysia) Izzat Dzulkeple (Malaysia) Hizlee Rais	(New Zealand) Sheldon Bagrie-Howley (New Zealand) Craig Tinker	
2024	(Scotland) Iain McLean	(Australia) Kyle Hansen	(Scotland) Iain McLean (Scotland) Darren Gualtieri	(England) Tom McGuinness (England) Harry Goodwin	
2025	(New Zealand) Aiden Takarua	(Wales) Daniel Salmon	(Scotland) Darren Gualtieri (Scotland) Gary Prunty	(England) Harry Goodwin (England) Dominic McVittie	

== Women's Finalists ==
Year	Singles		Pairs		Ref
Year	Winner	Finalist	Winner	Finalist	Ref
2008	(Scotland) Margaret Letham	(Canada) Shirley Ko	(Malaysia) Siti Zalina Ahmad (Malaysia) Nor Hashimah Ismail	(Wales) Hannah Smith (Wales) Anwen Butten	
2009	(New Zealand) Genevieve Baildon	(Canada) Josephine Lee	(Australia) Kelsey Cottrell (Australia) Julie Keegan	(Malaysia) Siti Zalina Ahmad (Malaysia) Nor Hashimah Ismail	
2010	(Malaysia) Nor Hashimah Ismail	(Malaysia) Siti Zalina Ahmad	(Australia) Kelsey Cottrell (Australia) Julie Keegan	(Philippines) Milagros Witheridge (Philippines) Sonia Bruce	
2012	(England) Sandy Hazell	(Hong Kong) Camilla Leung	(Wales) Judith Wason (Wales) Kelly Packwood	(Malaysia) Nor Hashimah Ismail (Hong Kong) Pinky Chan	
2013	(Scotland) Lorraine Malloy	(Philippines) Milagros Witheridge	(Australia) Kelsey Cottrell (Australia) Carla Odgers	(New Zealand) Val Smith (New Zealand) Mandy Boyd	
2014	(Malaysia) Siti Zalina Ahmad	(Philippines) Sonia Bruce	(Philippines) Ainie Knight (Philippines) Sonia Bruce	(Australia) Kelsey Cottrell (Australia) Carla Odgers	
2015	(Hong Kong) Dorothy Yu	(Hong Kong) Millicent Lai	(Hong Kong) Amy Choi (Hong Kong) Vivian Yip	(Australia) Kristina Krstic (Australia) Karen Murphy	
2016	(Malaysia) Zuraini Khalid	(Hong Kong) Dorothy Yu	(Philippines) Rosita Bradborn (Philippines) Sonia Bruce	(Malaysia) Zuraini Khalid (Malaysia) Noorazlinda Zakaria	
2017	(Hong Kong) Vivian Yip	(Australia) Julie Keegan	(Thailand) Songsin Tsao (Thailand) Jintana Visanuvimol	(South Africa) Nici Neal (Thailand) Colleen Piketh	
2018	(Malaysia) Siti Zalina Ahmad	(Malaysia) Emma Firyana Saroji	(Australia) Natasha Scott (Australia) Ellen Ryan	(Malaysia) Emma Firyana Saroji (Malaysia) Siti Zalina Ahmad	
2019 cancelled due to the 2019–20 Hong Kong protests. 2020 to 2022 cancelled due to COVID-19 pandemic.					
2023	(Hong Kong) Jenny Miu	(Hong Kong) Shandy Yu	(Scotland) Dee Hoggan (Scotland) Rachel Sinclair	(England) Nicole Rogers (England) Harriet Stevens	
2024	(Hong Kong) Cheryl Chan	(Philippines) Rosita Bradborn	(Canada) Emma Boyd (Canada) Kelly McKerihen	(England) Emma Cooper (England) Harriet Stevens	
2025	(Hong Kong) Dorothy Yu	(South Africa) Esme Kruger	(Scotland) Jess Weir (Scotland) Alison Lamont	(Hong Kong) Cheryl Chan (Hong Kong) Helen Cheung	

== See also ==
- World Bowls Events
