= George Souza =

George Souza may refer to:

- George Souza Jr. (born 1942), Hong Kong lawn and indoor bowler
- George Souza Sr. (1917–1983), Hong Kong lawn bowler
