= Oscar Adem =

Hong Kong bowler

Personal information
- Nationality: Hong Kong
Medal record
Representing Hong Kong
World Outdoor Championships
Bronze medal – third place	1972 Worthing	men's fours

Oscar Adem is a former Hong Kong international lawn and indoor bowler.

He won the bronze medal in the men's fours event at the 1972 World Outdoor Bowls Championship in Worthing with Saco Delgado, Abdul Kitchell and Roberto da Silva.
