= Lawn bowls at the 1978 Commonwealth Games =

- Venue: Commonwealth Lawn Bowling Club; Coronation Park Greens
- Location: Edmonton, Alberta, Canada
- Dates: 3 August – 12 August 1978

Lawn bowls at the 1978 Commonwealth Games was the tenth appearance of the Lawn bowls at the Commonwealth Games. Competition at the 1978 Commonwealth Games took place in Edmonton, Alberta, Canada from 3 to 12 August 1978.

The Commonwealth Lawn Bowling Club in Coronation Park, Woodcroft, played host to the bowling events.

Hong Kong topped the lawn bowls medal table by virtue of winning two gold medals.

== Medal table ==
* Host nation (Canada)

| Rank | Nation | Gold | Silver | Bronze | Total |
|---|---|---|---|---|---|
| 1 | Hong Kong | 2 | 0 | 0 | 2 |
| 2 | England | 1 | 0 | 0 | 1 |
| 3 | Australia | 0 | 1 | 0 | 1 |
| 3 | New Zealand | 0 | 1 | 0 | 1 |
| 3 | Scotland | 0 | 1 | 0 | 1 |
| 6 | Wales | 0 | 0 | 3 | 3 |
| Totals (6 entries) | | 3 | 3 | 3 | 9 |

== Medallists ==
| Event | Gold | Silver | Bronze |
|---|---|---|---|
| Men's singles | (England); David Bryant | (Australia); John Snell | (Wales); John Russell Evans |
| Men's pairs | (Hong Kong); Eric Liddell; Saco Delgado | (Scotland); Alex McIntosh; Willie Wood | (Wales); Jim Morgan; Ray Williams |
| Men's fours | (Hong Kong); Philip Chok; M B Hassan Jr. Omar Dallah; Roberto da Silva | (New Zealand); David Baldwin; Morgan Moffat; John Malcolm; Phil Skoglund | (Wales); Ellis Stanbury; Gwyn Evans; Ian Sutherland; Jock Thompson |

== Results ==
David Bryant defended his title with a fourth successive Commonwealth Games singles gold medal, the fifth of his medals cache despite not competing in 1966.
Hong Kong win both the Pairs and Fours.

=== Men's singles – round robin ===
| Pos | Player | P | W | L | F | A | Pts |
|---|---|---|---|---|---|---|---|
| 1 | (England) David Bryant | 15 | 13 | 2 | 310 | 172 | 26 |
| 2 | (Australia) John Snell | 15 | 11 | 4 | 288 | 210 | 22 |
| 3 | (Wales) John Russell Evans | 15 | 11 | 4 | 286 | 215 | 22 |
| 4 | (New Zealand) Kerry Clark | 15 | 10 | 5 | 292 | 205 | 20 |
| 5 | (Scotland) David McGill | 15 | 10 | 5 | 277 | 233 | 20 |
| 6 | (Canada) Bruce Matheson | 15 | 9 | 6 | 280 | 238 | 18 |
| 7 | (Hong Kong) George Souza Jr. | 15 | 9 | 6 | 269 | 231 | 18 |
| 8 | (Jersey) Arthur McKernan | 15 | 9 | 6 | 268 | 250 | 18 |
| 9 | (Papua New Guinea) Robert Madden | 15 | 8 | 8 | 260 | 245 | 16 |
| 10 | (Northern Ireland) Stan Espie | 15 | 7 | 8 | 242 | 266 | 14 |
| 11 | (Guernsey) Charlie Woodhard | 15 | 7 | 8 | 235 | 276 | 14 |
| 12 | (Malawi) Cyril Turner | 15 | 5 | 10 | 220 | 278 | 10 |
| 13 | (Fiji) Ram Harakh | 15 | 5 | 10 | 218 | 279 | 10 |
| 14 | (Samoa) Si’imoa Tolova’a | 15 | 4 | 11 | 198 | 296 | 8 |
| 15 | (Eswatini) Thomas Green | 15 | 2 | 13 | 192 | 289 | 4 |
| 16 | (Kenya) Denis Gosden | 15 | 0 | 15 | 163 | 315 | 0 |

=== Men's pairs – round robin ===
| Pos | Player | P | W | D | L | F | A | Pts |
|---|---|---|---|---|---|---|---|---|
| 1 | (Hong Kong) Eric Liddell & Saco Delgado | 13 | 10 | 0 | 3 | 291 | 213 | 20 |
| 2 | (Scotland) Alex McIntosh & Willie Wood | 13 | 9 | 0 | 4 | 321 | 211 | 18 |
| 3 | (Wales) Jim Morgan & Ray Williams | 13 | 9 | 0 | 4 | 304 | 213 | 18 |
| 4 | (Australia) Bruno Panozzo & Geoff Oakley | 13 | 9 | 0 | 4 | 301 | 216 | 18 |
| 5 | (Canada) Graham Jarvis & Ronnie Jones | 13 | 9 | 0 | 4 | 296 | 221 | 18 |
| 6 | (New Zealand) Ivan Kostanich & Bob McDonald | 13 | 8 | 1 | 4 | 286 | 239 | 17 |
| 7 | (Northern Ireland) Brendan McBrien & John Higgins | 13 | 8 | 0 | 5 | 275 | 228 | 16 |
| 8 | (England) Chris Ward & Jim Ashman | 13 | 7 | 1 | 5 | 259 | 237 | 15 |
| 9 | (Papua New Guinea) Robert Balenzuela & William Madden | 13 | 7 | 0 | 6 | 230 | 256 | 14 |
| 10 | (Samoa) Fetalaiga Kirisome & Maurice Fenn | 13 | 3 | 1 | 9 | 198 | 291 | 7 |
| 11 | (Fiji) George Thaggard & Peter Oates | 13 | 3 | 0 | 10 | 217 | 282 | 6 |
| 12 | (Kenya) Harry Smith & Reg Fright | 13 | 2 | 2 | 9 | 217 | 350 | 6 |
| 13 | (Eswatini) Derek Pocock & Michael O'Connor | 13 | 2 | 1 | 10 | 181 | 347 | 5 |
| 14 | (Malawi) Edward Davy & Peter Crossan | 13 | 2 | 0 | 11 | 205 | 277 | 4 |

=== Men's fours – round robin ===
| Pos | Player | P | W | D | L | F | A | Pts |
|---|---|---|---|---|---|---|---|---|
| 1 | (Hong Kong) Philip Chok, M B Hassan Jr., Omar Dallah, Roberto da Silva | 14 | 12 | 0 | 2 | 300+ | 226+ | 24 |
| 2 | (New Zealand) David Baldwin, Morgan Moffat, John Malcolm, Phil Skoglund | 14 | 11 | 1 | 2 | 333 | 223 | 23 |
| 3 | (Wales) Ellis Stanbury, Gwyn Evans, Ian Sutherland, Jock Thompson | 14 | 9 | 2 | 3 | 304 | 225 | 20 |
| 4 | (Northern Ireland) Jimmy Donnelly, Michael Dunlop, Willie Murray, Willie Watson | 14 | 9 | 1 | 4 | 297+ | 211+ | 19 |
| 5 | (Scotland) Doug Copland, John Fleming, Dick Bernard, Willie Adrain | 14 | 8 | 2 | 4 | 303 | 256 | 18 |
| 6 | (England) Charlie Burch, Mal Hughes, Bob Robertson, Bill Irish | 14 | 8 | 1 | 5 | 285 | 218 | 17 |
| 7 | (Australia) Clarence Watkins, Errol Bungey, John Wilson, Philip Bushby | 14 | 7 | 0 | 6 | 272 | 256 | 15 |
| 8 | (Zambia) George Hodkinson, Jeffrey McLean, John Keeling, Thomas Powell | 14 | 7 | 0 | 7 | 275 | 265 | 14 |
| 9 | (Guernsey) Clarence Blondel, Cyril Smith, Derek Hurford, Norman Leber | 14 | 6 | 0 | 7 | 254 | 303 | 13 |
| 10 | (Kenya) Clifford De Rungary, High Barnes, Sydney Meredith, Williams Watson | 14 | 5 | 0 | 8 | 232 | 323 | 11 |
| 11 | (Papua New Guinea) Robert Henderson, Rolf Meyer, Thomas Menton, Thomas Langton | 14 | 5 | 0 | 9 | 254 | 263 | 10 |
| 12 | (Fiji) Asaili Hughes, Neumi Tabuyaqona, Peter Fong, Peter Underhill | 14 | 4 | 1 | 8 | 251 | 291 | 10 |
| 13 | (Canada) Barrie McFadden, Burnie Gill, James Morrison, Neal Salkeld | 14 | 4 | 0 | 10 | 249 | 293 | 8 |
| 14 | (Eswatini) David Thompson, John Thomas, Ken Thomson, Willem Lorentz | 14 | 3 | 0 | 11 | 206 | 320 | 6 |
| 15 | (Samoa) Ale Sam Ale, Falevi Petana, Lata’a Devoe, Sioane Tapasu Lino | 14 | 1 | 0 | 11 | 208 | 350 | 2 |

+ Missing Hong Kong v N Ireland score

== See also ==
- List of Commonwealth Games medallists in lawn bowls
- Lawn bowls at the Commonwealth Games
