= 1980 World Outdoor Bowls Championship =

World bowls event

Men's World Outdoor Championships 1980
- 4th Men's World Outdoor Bowls Championships
- Location: Frankston, Melbourne, Australia
- Date(s): 17 January - 02 February, 1980.
- Category: World Bowls Championship

The 1980 Men's World Outdoor Bowls Championship was held at the City of Frankston Bowling Club in Frankston, Melbourne, Australia, from 17 January to 2 February 1980.

The Australian government would not allow the South African team to compete because of the South African policy of apartheid.

David Bryant won his second singles title following his triumph in the 1966 competition.

Australia won the pairs, England won the triples and Hong Kong won the fours. The Leonard Trophy went to England who beat Australia into first place by virtue of having a higher shot percentage.

== Medallists ==
| Event | Gold | Silver | Bronze |
|---|---|---|---|
| Men's singles | (England); David Bryant | (Australia); John Snell | (Scotland); David McGill |
| Men's pairs | (Australia); Alf Sandercock; Peter Rheuben | (Canada); Burnie Gill; Graham Jarvis | (New Zealand); Phil Skoglund; Kevin Darling |
| Men's triples | (England); Jimmy Hobday; Tony Allcock; David Bryant | (Scotland); John Summers; David McGill; Willie McQueen | (New Zealand); John Malcolm; Nick Unkovich; Morgan Moffat |
| Men's fours | (Hong Kong); Philip Chok; Omar Dallah; George Souza Jr. Eric Liddell | (Scotland); John Summers; Willie McQueen; Alex McIntosh; Willie Wood | (New Zealand); John Malcolm; Kevin Darling; Phil Skoglund; Morgan Moffat |
| Men's Team | England | Australia | Scotland |

== Tables ==
=== Men's singles – round robin ===
| Pos | Player | P | W | D | L | Pts |
|---|---|---|---|---|---|---|
| 1 | (England) David Bryant | 19 | 18 | 0 | 1 | 36 |
| 2 | (Australia) John Snell | 19 | 15 | 0 | 4 | 30+ |
| 3 | (Scotland) David McGill | 19 | 15 | 0 | 4 | 30 |
| 4 | (New Zealand) Nick Unkovich | 19 | 14 | 0 | 5 | 28 |
| 5 | (Wales) John Russell Evans | 19 | 14 | 0 | 5 | 28 |
| 6 | (Hong Kong) Philip Chok | 19 | 12 | 0 | 7 | 24 |
| 7 | Stan Espie | 19 | 11 | 0 | 8 | 22 |
| 8 | (Guernsey) Keith Shaw | 19 | 11 | 0 | 8 | 22 |
| 9 | (Canada) Dave Duncalf | 19 | 9 | 0 | 10 | 18 |
| 10 | (Jersey) Arthur McKernan | 19 | 9 | 0 | 10 | 18 |
| 11 | (United States) Dick Folkins | 15 | 9 | 0 | 10 | 18 |
| 12 | (Zambia) Dan Coetzee | 19 | 8 | 1 | 10 | 17 |
| 13 | (Samoa) Feta Kirisome | 19 | 8 | 0 | 11 | 16 |
| 14 | (Kenya) Sid Meredith | 19 | 8 | 0 | 11 | 16 |
| 15 | (Israel) Cecil Cooper | 19 | 7 | 1 | 11 | 15 |
| 16 | (Eswatini) Tom Green | 19 | 6 | 0 | 13 | 12 |
| 17 | (Papua New Guinea) Bob Madden | 19 | 6 | 0 | 13 | 12 |
| 18 | (Malawi) Eddie Turner | 19 | 5 | 0 | 14 | 10 |
| 19 | (Fiji) Oscar Raymond | 19 | 4 | 0 | 15 | 8 |
| 20 | (Japan) Kichi Koriuchi | 19 | 0 | 0 | 19 | 0 |

+ Silver medal by virtue of higher shot percentage

=== Men's pairs – round robin ===
| Pos | Player | P | W | D | L | Pts |
|---|---|---|---|---|---|---|
| 1 | (Australia) Alf Sandercock & Peter Rheuben | 19 | 17 | 1 | 1 | 35 |
| 2 | (Canada) Burnie Gill & Graham Jarvis | 19 | 17 | 0 | 2 | 34 |
| 3 | (New Zealand) Phil Skoglund & Kevin Darling | 19 | 14 | 1 | 4 | 29 |
| 4 | (England) John Bell & Mal Hughes | 19 | 12 | 1 | 6 | 25 |
| 5 | (Scotland) Willie Wood & Alex McIntosh | 19 | 11 | 2 | 6 | 24 |
| 6 | Stan Espie & Brendan McBrien | 19 | 11 | 1 | 7 | 23 |
| 7 | (United States) Neil McInnes & Frank Souza | 19 | 11 | 0 | 8 | 22 |
| 8 | (Jersey) Marcel Coutoly & John Jones | 19 | 10 | 1 | 8 | 21 |
| 9 | (Wales) Lyn Perkins & Spencer Wilshire | 15 | 10 | 1 | 8 | 21 |
| 10 | (Hong Kong) George Souza Jr. & Eric Liddell | 15 | 10 | 0 | 9 | 20 |
| 11 | (Papua New Guinea) Alan Ramsbotham & Bob Madden | 15 | 9 | 2 | 8 | 20 |
| 12 | Guernsey | 15 | 8 | 0 | 11 | 16 |
| 13 | (Zambia) Dan Coetzee & Another | 15 | 8 | 0 | 11 | 16 |
| 14 | (Fiji) George Thaggard & Shaun Patton | 15 | 8 | 0 | 11 | 16 |
| 15 | (Samoa) Feta Kirisome, Sioane Lino+ & Falevi Petana | 19 | 7 | 0 | 12 | 14 |
| 16 | (Israel) Cecil Cooper & Jack Trappler | 19 | 6 | 1 | 12 | 13 |
| 17 | (Eswatini) Tom Green & Ted Cambridge | 19 | 6 | 0 | 13 | 12 |
| 18 | (Malawi) Pat Niland & Dave Ross | 19 | 5 | 1 | 13 | 11 |
| 19 | Kenya | 19 | 3 | 0 | 16 | 6 |
| 20 | (Japan) Kichi Koriuchi & Another | 19 | 0 | 0 | 19 | 0 |

+ injury replacement

=== Men's triples – round robin ===
| Pos | Player | P | W | D | L | Pts |
|---|---|---|---|---|---|---|
| 1 | (England) Jimmy Hobday, Tony Allcock & David Bryant | 19 | 18 | 0 | 1 | 36 |
| 2 | (Scotland) John Summers, David McGill & Willie McQueen | 19 | 16 | 1 | 2 | 33 |
| 3 | (New Zealand) John Malcolm, Nick Unkovich & Morgan Moffat | 19 | 14 | 1 | 4 | 29 |
| 4 | (Fiji) Kevin Parry, Oscar Raymond & Peter Fong | 19 | 13 | 1 | 5 | 27 |
| 5 | (Australia) John Snell, Keith Poole & Ron Taylor | 19 | 12 | 1 | 6 | 25 |
| 6 | (Canada) Dave Duncalf, Bill Boettger & Barry McFadden | 19 | 12 | 0 | 7 | 24 |
| 7 | (United States) Clive Forrester, Bert MacWilliams & Dick Folkins | 19 | 12 | 0 | 7 | 24 |
| 8 | (Hong Kong) Philip Chok, M B Hassan Jr. & Omar Dallah | 19 | 11 | 1 | 7 | 23 |
| 9 | John Higgins, John Greer & Willie Watson | 19 | 11 | 0 | 8 | 22 |
| 10 | (Zambia) John O'Flaherty, Jeff McLean & Tom Powell | 19 | 9 | 1 | 9 | 19 |
| 11 | (Eswatini) Jack Thomas, Ken Thomson, & Jack Fulton | 19 | 9 | 0 | 10 | 18 |
| 12 | (Wales) John Russell Evans, Bob Thomas & Gwyn Evans | 19 | 9 | 0 | 10 | 18 |
| 13 | Israel | 19 | 8 | 0 | 11 | 16 |
| 14 | (Jersey) ken Lowery, Frank Hambly & Arthur McKernan | 19 | 8 | 0 | 11 | 16 |
| 15 | (Papua New Guinea) Harry Morton, Heiner Veirling & Brian Sullivan | 19 | 6 | 0 | 13 | 12 |
| 16 | (Malawi) John Chalmers, Peter Crossan & Eddie Turner | 19 | 5 | 1 | 13 | 11 |
| 17 | Guernsey | 19 | 5 | 0 | 14 | 10 |
| 18 | Kenya | 19 | 4 | 0 | 15 | 8 |
| 19 | Western Samoa | 19 | 3 | 1 | 15 | 7 |
| 20 | (Japan) Jitsuji Ueyma, Key Takaya & Shozo Yamaha | 19 | 1 | 0 | 18 | 2 |

=== Men's fours – round robin ===
| Pos | Player | P | W | D | L | Pts |
|---|---|---|---|---|---|---|
| 1 | (Hong Kong) Philip Chok, Omar Dallah, George Souza Jr. & Eric Liddell | 19 | 15 | 1 | 1 | 31 |
| 2 | (Scotland) John Summers, Willie McQueen, Alex McIntosh & Willie Wood | 19 | 14 | 1 | 4 | 29 |
| 3 | (New Zealand) John Malcolm, Kevin Darling, Phil Skoglund & Morgan Moffat | 19 | 14 | 1 | 4 | 29 |
| 4 | (Australia) Alf Sandercock, Peter Rheuben, Keith Poole & Ron Taylor | 19 | 13 | 2 | 4 | 28 |
| 5 | (Wales) Lyn Perkins & Spencer Wilshire, Bob Thomas & Gwyn Evans | 19 | 13 | 1 | 6 | 27 |
| 6 | (England) Jimmy Hobday, Tony Allcock, John Bell & Mal Hughes | 19 | 11 | 3 | 5 | 25 |
| 7 | John Higgins, John Greer, Willie Watson & Brendan McBrien | 19 | 12 | 0 | 7 | 24 |
| 8 | (Canada) Graham Jarvis, Don Gibson+, Bill Boettger, Burnie Gill & Barry McFadden | 19 | 10 | 4 | 5 | 24 |
| 9 | (United States) Clive Forrester, Bert MacWilliams, Frank Souza & Neil McInnes | 19 | 11 | 1 | 7 | 23 |
| 10 | (Fiji) Kevin Parry, Peter Fong, Shaun Patton & George Thaggard | 19 | 10 | 0 | 9 | 20 |
| 11 | (Papua New Guinea) Harry Morton, Heiner Veirling & Brian Sullivan, Alan Ramsbotham | 19 | 10 | 0 | 9 | 20 |
| 12 | (Zambia) John O'Flaherty, Jeff McLean, Tom Powell & Another | 19 | 8 | 0 | 11 | 16 |
| 13 | (Israel) Jack Trappler | 19 | 7 | 0 | 12 | 14 |
| 14 | (Jersey) Ken Lowery, Frank Hambly, Marcel Coutoly & John Jones | 19 | 6 | 1 | 12 | 13 |
| 15 | Guernsey | 19 | 6 | 0 | 13 | 12 |
| 16 | (Malawi) Pat Niland, John Chalmers, Peter Crossan & Dave Ross | 19 | 6 | 0 | 13 | 12 |
| 17 | Kenya | 19 | 5 | 1 | 13 | 11 |
| 18 | (Samoa) Sioane Lino, Falevi Petana, 2 others, & Denis Dalton (Aus)+ | 19 | 5 | 0 | 14 | 10 |
| 19 | (Eswatini) Jack Thomas, Ken Thomson, & Jack Fulton, Ted Cambridge | 19 | 4 | 0 | 15 | 8 |
| 20 | (Japan) Jitsuji Ueyma, Key Takaya, Shozo Yamaha & Another | 19 | 0 | 0 | 19 | 0 |

+ injury replacement

=== W.M.Leonard Trophy ===
| Pos | Team | Singles | Pairs | Triples | Fours | Points | shot % |
|---|---|---|---|---|---|---|---|
| 1 | England | 20 | 17 | 20 | 15 | 72 | 1.604 |
| 2 | Australia | 19 | 20 | 16 | 17 | 72 | 1.581 |
| 3 | Scotland | 18 | 16 | 19 | 19 | 72 | 1.500 |
| 4 | New Zealand | 17 | 18 | 18 | 18 | 71 | |
| 5 | Hong Kong | 15 | 11 | 15 | 20 | 61 | |
| 6 | Canada | 12 | 19 | 14 | 13 | 58 | |
| 7 | Ireland | 14 | 15 | 12 | 14 | 55 | |
| 8 | Wales | 16 | 12 | 10 | 16 | 55 | |
| 9 | United States | 10 | 14 | 13 | 12 | 49 | |
| 10 | Jersey | 11 | 13 | 7 | 7 | 38 | |
| 11 | Fiji | 2 | 7 | 17 | 11 | 37 | |
| 12 | Zambia | 9 | 8 | 9 | 9 | 35 | |
| 13 | Guernsey | 13 | 9 | 4 | 6 | 32 | |
| 14 | Papua New Guinea | 5 | 10 | 6 | 10 | 31 | |
| 15 | Israel | 8 | 5 | 8 | 8 | 29 | |
| 16 | (Eswatini) Swaziland | 4 | 4 | 11 | 2 | 21 | |
| 17 | Western Samoa | 7 | 6 | 2 | 3 | 18 | |
| 18 | Malawi | 3 | 3 | 5 | 5 | 16 | |
| 19 | Kenya | 6 | 2 | 3 | 4 | 15 | |
| 20 | Japan | 1 | 1 | 1 | 1 | 4 | |

== Full results ==
=== Men's singles ===
Extended content

Men's singles round robin
| Round 1 (25 Jan) | | |
| Hong Kong | Kenya | 21–12 |
| Australia | Scotland | 21–15 |
| Israel | Western Samoa | 21–5 |
| England | Fiji | 21–8 |
| New Zealand | Swaziland | 21–12 |
| United States | Ireland | 21–18 |
| Canada | Zambia | 21–11 |
| Wales | Malawi | 21–6 |
| Papua New Guinea | Japan | 21–4 |
| Guernsey | Jersey | 21–10 |
| Round 2 (25 Jan) | | |
| Malawi | Canada | 21–16 |
| Australia | Swaziland | 21–4 |
| Israel | Hong Kong | 21–17 |
| England | Guernsey | 21–17 |
| New Zealand | Papua New Guinea | 21–12 |
| Kenya | United States | 21–18 |
| Ireland | Fiji | 21–14 |
| Wales | Japan | 21–9 |
| Zambia | Scotland | 21–11 |
| Western Samoa | Jersey | 21–14 |
| Round 3 (26 Jan) | | |
| Hong Kong | Western Samoa | 21–8 |
| Zambia | Guernsey | 21–12 |
| Ireland | Kenya | 21–6 |
| England | Scotland | 21–15 |
| Swaziland | Papua New Guinea | 21–16 |
| United States | Fiji | 21–19 |
| Malawi | Japan | 21–13 |
| Wales | Canada | 21–11 |
| New Zealand | Australia | 21–14 |
| Jersey | Israel | 21–15 |
| Round 4 (26 Jan) | | |
| Scotland | Wales | 21–6 |
| Australia | Hong Kong | 21–14 |
| Western Samoa | United States | 21–17 |
| England | Papua New Guinea | 21–16 |
| New Zealand | Guernsey | 21–15 |
| Kenya | Jersey | 21–20 |
| Ireland | Canada | 21–16 |
| Malawi | Fiji | 21–18 |
| Zambia | Japan | 21–5 |
| Swaziland | Israel | 21–20 |
| Round 5 (27 Jan) | | |
| Hong Kong | Swaziland | 21–11 |
| Ireland | Australia | 21–11 |
| Israel | Japan | 21–1 |
| England | Zambia | 21–7 |
| Kenya | New Zealand | 21–18 |
| Scotland | United States | 21–13 |
| Fiji | Canada | 21–15 |
| Wales | Guernsey | 21–8 |
| Western Samoa | Papua New Guinea | 21–11 |
| Jersey | Malawi | 21–11 |
| Round 6 (27 Jan) | | |
| Hong Kong | United States | 21–19 |
| Australia | Zambia | 21–13 |
| Kenya | Israel | 21–18 |
| England | Ireland | 21–11 |
| New Zealand | Japan | 21–7 |
| Scotland | Swaziland | 21–9 |
| Jersey | Canada | 21–16 |
| Malawi | Western Samoa | 21–18 |
| Wales | Papua New Guinea | 21–9 |
| Guernsey | Fiji | 21–16 |
| Round 7 (27 Jan) | | |
| Hong Kong | Papua New Guinea | 21–12 |
| Scotland | Fiji | 21–10 |
| Ireland | Zambia | 21–17 |
| England | Malawi | 21–2 |
| New Zealand | Israel | 21–10 |
| United States | Swaziland | 21–16 |
| Guernsey | Canada | 21–17 |
| Wales | Western Samoa | 21–11 |
| Jersey | Japan | 21–5 |
| Australia | Kenya | 21–18 |
| Round 8 (28 Jan) | | |
| Hong Kong | Zambia | 21–15 |
| Guernsey | Australia | 21–20 |
| Israel | Scotland | 21–17 |
| England | Swaziland | 21–11 |
| New Zealand | Western Samoa | 21–7 |
| United States | Malawi | 21–5 |
| Canada | Kenya | 21–12 |
| Wales | Ireland | 21–18 |
| Fiji | Japan | 21–3 |
| Papua New Guinea | Jersey | 21–9 |
| Round 9 (28 Jan) | | |
| Hong Kong | Jersey | 21–8 |
| Australia | Papua New Guinea | 21–9 |
| Kenya | Fiji | 21–12 |
| England | Western Samoa | 21–13 |
| Wales | New Zealand | 21–20 |
| United States | Israel | 21–19 |
| Canada | Japan | 21–4 |
| Scotland | Malawi | 21–10 |
| Zambia | Swaziland | 21–10 |
| Ireland | Guernsey | 21–7 |
| Round 10 (28 Jan) | | |
| Canada | Hong Kong | 21–17 |
| Scotland | Western Samoa | 21–9 |
| Ireland | Japan | 21–4 |
| England | New Zealand | 21–10 |
| Australia | Jersey | 21–9 |
| United States | Wales | 21–20 |
| Israel | Zambia | 20–20 |
| Malawi | Kenya | 21–12 |
| Fiji | Papua New Guinea | 21–6 |
| Guernsey | Swaziland | 21–8 |

Men's singles round robin
| Round 11 (30 Jan) | | |
| Hong Kong | Japan | 21–8 |
| Australia | Malawi | 21–15 |
| Western Samoa | Fiji | 21–19 |
| England | Kenya | 21–5 |
| New Zealand | Zambia | 21–14 |
| Jersey | Ireland | 21–14 |
| Swaziland | Canada | 21–19 |
| Wales | Israel | 21–16 |
| Scotland | Papua New Guinea | 21–9 |
| Guernsey | United States | 21–13 |
| Round 12 (30 Jan) | | |
| Hong Kong | Fiji | 21–17 |
| Scotland | Canada | 21–10 |
| Zambia | Malawi | 21–9 |
| Guernsey | Western Samoa | 21–15 |
| New Zealand | United States | 21–8 |
| Ireland | Israel | 21–14 |
| Australia | Japan | 21–1 |
| Wales | Swaziland | 21–13 |
| Papua New Guinea | Kenya | 21–16 |
| Jersey | England | 21–19 |
| Round 13 (30 Jan) | | |
| Hong Kong | Ireland | 21–19 |
| Australia | Canada | 21–14 |
| Kenya | Western Samoa | 21–15 |
| England | United States | 21–5 |
| Scotland | New Zealand | 21–20 |
| Swaziland | Japan | 21–11 |
| Israel | Guernsey | 21–19 |
| Wales | Zambia | 21–13 |
| Papua New Guinea | Malawi | 21–7 |
| Jersey | Fiji | 21–12 |
| Round 14 (31 Jan)' | | |
| Hong Kong | Malawi | 21–15 |
| Australia | Western Samoa | 21–6 |
| Scotland | Kenya | 21–14 |
| England | Wales | 21–15 |
| Jersey | Swaziland | 21–19 |
| Zambia | United States | 21–20 |
| Canada | Israel | 21–14 |
| New Zealand | Fiji | 21–5 |
| Ireland | Papua New Guinea | 21–10 |
| Guernsey | Japan | 21–15 |
| Round 15 (31 Jan) | | |
| Swaziland | Malawi | 21–15 |
| Australia | Wales | 21–17 |
| Israel | Fiji | 21–13 |
| England | Hong Kong | 21–16 |
| Western Samoa | Ireland | 21–16 |
| United States | Jersey | 21–17 |
| Canada | New Zealand | 21–17 |
| Papua New Guinea | Zambia | 21–14 |
| Scotland | Japan | 21–3 |
| Kenya | Guernsey | 21–14 |
| Round 16 (1 Feb) | | |
| Swaziland | Kenya | 21–11 |
| Australia | United States | 21–6 |
| Western Samoa | Japan | 21–6 |
| England | Canada | 21–6 |
| New Zealand | Hong Kong | 21–5 |
| Scotland | Ireland | 21–12 |
| Zambia | Fiji | 21–8 |
| Wales | Jersey | 21–11 |
| Papua New Guinea | Israel | 21–11 |
| Guernsey | Malawi | 21–10 |
| Round 17 (1 Feb) | | |
| Zambia | Kenya | 21–11 |
| Australia | Israel | 21–3 |
| Ireland | Malawi | 21–11 |
| England | Japan | 21–11 |
| New Zealand | Jersey | 21–7 |
| United States | Papua New Guinea | 21–14 |
| Canada | Western Samoa | 21–12 |
| Hong Kong | Wales | 21–16 |
| Fiji | Swaziland | 21–18 |
| Scotland | Guernsey | 21–10 |
| Round 18 (1 Feb) | | |
| Canada | Papua New Guinea | 21–11 |
| Australia | Fiji | 21–17 |
| New Zealand | Malawi | 21–9 |
| England | Israel | 21–16 |
| Ireland | Swaziland | 21–9 |
| United States | Japan | 21–5 |
| Western Samoa | Zambia | 21–14 |
| Wales | Kenya | 21–7 |
| Scotland | Jersey | 21–13 |
| Guernsey | Hong Kong | 21–17 |
| Round 19 (2 Feb) | | |
| Kenya | Japan | 21–13 |
| Wales | Fiji | 21–5 |
| Western Samoa | Swaziland | 21–5 |
| England | Australia | 21–19 |
| New Zealand | Ireland | 21–6 |
| Canada | United States | 21–5 |
| Jersey | Zambia | 21–15 |
| Israel | Malawi | 21–14 |
| Scotland | Hong Kong | 21–14 |
| Guernsey | Papua New Guinea | 21–16 |
