= George Souza Sr. =

Hong Kong international lawn bowler

Personal information
- Nationality: Hongkonger
- Born: 7 January 1917 British Hong Kong
- Died: 27 March 1983 (aged 66) British Hong Kong
Medal record
Representing Hong Kong
Commonwealth Games
Gold medal – first place	1970 Edinburgh	fours

George Allister Souza Sr. (7 January 1917 – 27 March 1983) was a Hong Kong international lawn bowler.

== Bowls career ==
Souza was born in Hong Kong on 7 January 1917, to Portuguese parents. He represented Hong Kong at cricket from 1953 to 1961 and won a gold medal in the fours at the 1970 Commonwealth Games in Edinburgh with Abdul Kitchell, Saco Delgado and Roberto da Silva.

== Personal life and death ==
Souza was an electric company employee by trade and his son George Souza Jr. became a world bowls champion.

Souza died in Hong Kong on 27 March 1983, at the age of 66.
