= Emma Boyd =

Canadian lawn bowler (born 2000)

Personal information
- Nationality: Canadian
- Born: 29 July 2000 (age 26) Tsawwassen, Delta, British Columbia, Canada

Sport
- Sport: Lawn bowls
- Club: Tsawwassen LBC, Pacific IBC / Club Tweed BC

Achievements and titles
- Highest world ranking: 30 (June 2025)
Medal record
World Outdoor Championships
Bronze medal – third place	2023 Gold Coast	triples
Bowls World Cup
Bronze medal – third place	2025 Kuala Lumpur	pairs
Hong Kong International Classic
Gold medal – first place	2024	pairs
IIBC Championships
Gold medal – first place	2017	U25 mixed doubles

Emma Boyd (born 29 July 2000) is a Canadian international lawn bowler. She reached a career high ranking of world number 30 in June 2025.

== Career ==
Boyd came to prominence in 2017, when she was selected by Canada for the 2017 World Junior Championships in Wales, known as the IIBC Championships. She won the Under-25 mixed doubles gold medal at the Championships. She later moved to live in Australia and joined the Tweed Heads BC.

In 2023, she was selected as part of the team to represent Canada at the blue riband event of the sport, the 2023 World Outdoor Bowls Championship. She participated in the women's triples and the women's fours events. In the fours, Boyd qualified in second place in her group before being eliminated in the quarter final after losing to Scotland. One week later in the triples partnering Joanna Cooper and Baylee van Steijn, the team won a bronze medal after losing to New Zealand in the semi finals.

In 2024, Boyd won the Australian Open fours title with Leanne Chinery, Louise Cronan and Kelly McKerihen. In November 2024, Boyd won the Hong Kong International Classic pairs with McKerihen.

In 2026, Boyd made her Commonwealth Games debut in Glasgow, Scotland with the national Bowls team. She finished 8th in Bowls Pairs competition.
