= Lawn Bowls Association of Hong Kong, China =

Governing body for the sport of bowls in Hong Kong, China

- Sport: Bowls
- Jurisdiction: Hong Kong, China
- Founded: 1908/1961
- Affiliation: World Bowls
- Headquarters: Causeway Bay, Hong Kong
- Location: Olympic House, 1 Stadium Path
- Secretary: David Leung

Official website
- www.bowls.org.hk
- (Hong Kong)

Lawn Bowls Association of Hong Kong, China formerly the Hong Kong Lawn Bowls Association (HKLBA) is the governing body for the sport of bowls in Hong Kong, China. The organisation is responsible for the promotion and development of lawn bowls in Hong Kong, and is affiliated with the world governing body World Bowls.

The Association organise tournaments such as men's and women's Hong Kong National Bowls Championships, with competition in the main bowls disciplines of singles, pairs, triples and fours/rinks and has 44 affiliated lawn bowls clubs.

== History ==
Bowls as a sport began in Hong Kong in 1897, when the first recorded game was played at 9 Knutsford Terrace in Kowloon. The players that participated in the game, Archie Ritchie, W. C. Jack, James Macdonald and W. Ramsay were all Scottish and they teamed up with A. Ewing, E. C. Wilkes, H. Schoolbred and J. Allen to form the Kowloon Bowling Green Club.

An association was formed in 1908 based on the Scottish Bowling Association but affiliated to the England Bowling Association. The sport survived and was still played during the Japanese occupation of Hong Kong.

The modern day Hong Kong Lawn Bowls Association was formed on 11 March 1961.

In 1981 the Hong Kong International Bowls Classic was inaugurated and remains a major competition for bowlers from around the world.

== See also ==
- Hong Kong National Bowls Championships
- Sport in Hong Kong
