= 2025 World Cup =

2025 World Cup may refer to:

== Cricket ==
- 2025 Women's Cricket World Cup
- 2025 Under-19 Women's T20 World Cup

== Football ==
- 2025 FIFA Club World Cup
- 2025 FIFA Futsal Women's World Cup
- 2025 FIFA U-17 World Cup
- 2025 FIFA U-20 World Cup

== Rugby ==
- 2025 Women's Rugby World Cup
- 2025 Rugby League World Cup (cancelled)

== Other ==
- 2025 Bowls World Cup
- 2025 Kho Kho World Cup
- 2025 Chess World Cup
- 2025 PDC World Cup of Darts
- 2024–25 FIS Alpine Ski World Cup
