= Mal Hughes =

British lawn bowler

Personal information
- Nationality: British (English)
- Born: 3 August 1932 Hartlepool, England
- Died: 11 July 2008 (aged 75) Middlesbrough, England

Sport
- Sport: Lawn bowls
- Club: Eldon Grove BC
Medal record
Representing England
World Outdoor Championships
Gold medal – first place	1980 Frankston	team

Malcolm "Mal" Hughes (1932–2008) was an English international lawn and indoor bowler.

== Biography ==
Hughes competed for England at the 1978 Commonwealth Games in the fours event.

In 1979 he won the inaugural Hartlepool Sports Personality of the Year award.

The following year, he won a gold medal in the team event (Leonard Cup) at the 1980 World Outdoor Bowls Championship in Melbourne with Tony Allcock, David Bryant, Jimmy Hobday and John Bell.

He was the national pairs champion with George Turley at the 1983 National Championships bowling for Eldon Grove BC of Durham.

Hughes was the manager of Hartlepool Indoor Bowls Club up until the time he died in 2008.
