= Mel Stewart (bowls) =

Hong Kong lawn bowler

Personal information
- Nationality: Hongkonger
Medal record
Representing (Hong Kong)
Asia Pacific Bowls Championships
Silver medal – second place	1989 Suva	fours
Gold medal – first place	1991 Kowloon	triples
Bronze medal – third place	1991 Kowloon	fours
Silver medal – second place	1993 Victoria	fours
Bronze medal – third place	1995 Dunedin	fours

Melvyn Stewart is a former Hong Kong international lawn bowler.

== Bowls career ==
Stewart has represented Hong Kong at two Commonwealth Games; in the fours event at the 1990 Commonwealth Games and in the fours event at the 1994 Commonwealth Games.

He won five medals at the Asia Pacific Bowls Championships, including a gold medal with David Tso and George Souza Jr. in the 1991 triples at Kowloon.
