= Gwyn Evans (bowls) =

Welsh lawn bowls player (born 1931)

Personal information
- Nationality: British (Welsh)
- Born: 15 August 1931 (age 95) Gelli, Wales

Sport
- Sport: Lawn bowls
- Club: Gelli Park BC
Medal record
Representing Wales
Commonwealth Games
Bronze medal – third place	1978 Edmonton	men's fours

Gwynfryn "Gwyn" Evans (born 15 August 1931) is a Welsh former international lawn bowls player who competed at the Commonwealth Games.

== Personal life ==
Evans was part of a famous bowls family. He was born in Gelli, Rhondda. His father Clifford Maldwyn Evans (1904-1985) and uncle John Morgan Evans (1917-1985), a world-class player, won the Welsh Pairs Championship in 1952.

Gwyn worked as a chartered public finance accountant and chief executive of Rhondda Borough Council until his retirement.

His brother was Maldwyn Evans (1937-2009) (the 1972 World Outdoor Bowls Championship gold medal winner)

== Bowls career ==
Evans won a bronze medal in the men's fours at the 1978 Commonwealth Games in Edmonton with Ellis Stanbury, Ian Sutherland and John Thomson.

He represented Wales from 1967 until 1985, won the Welsh indoor singles title in 1978, and captained the Welsh team in the 1980 World Outdoor Bowls Championship in Melbourne.

Evans won two National Championship Pairs titles in 1966 and 1967, with his brother Maldwyn and one fours title in 1961.
