= Ken Chan (bowls) =

Hongkonger lawn and indoor bowler (born 1985)

Personal information
- Nationality: Chinese (Hongkonger)
- Born: 1985 (age 40–41)

Sport
- Club: Kowloon CC
Medal record
Representing (Hong Kong)
Hong Kong International Bowls Classic
Gold medal – first place	2007	pairs

Ken Chan (born 1985) is an international lawn and indoor bowler from China (Hong Kong). He is a 12 times champion of Hong Kong.

== Bowls career ==
Chan has won 18 Hong Kong national titles (3 singles, 5 pairs, 7 triples and 3 fours).

In 2005, he won the silver medal in the pairs at the prestigious Hong Kong International Bowls Classic and won the Hong Kong bowler of the year. Two years later in 2007, he won the gold medal with Noel Kennedy in the pairs.

In 2008, he won the Hong Kong bowler of the year for the second time. In 2014, he won the men's National singles and as a result won the Bowler of the Year alongside his mother Anna, who won the women's national singles the same year. In addition he won the national pairs for Kowloon CC, with Noel Kennedy. It was the third time that he had won the bowler of the year.

In 2023, Chan reached the semi-finals of the open pairs with Jason Choi at the 2023 World Indoor Bowls Championship. On their way to the semi-finals they defeated the world champions Darren Burnett and Stewart Anderson in the quarter-finals.
