= Jesse Noronha =

Australian lawn bowler

Personal information
- Nationality: Australian
- Born: 6 April 1991 (age 33)

Sport
- Club: Cabramatta BC

Jesse Noronha (born 6 April 1991) is an Australian international lawn bowler.

== Bowls career ==
He started bowling in 2003 and his first success was the NSW state junior singles title in 2007. He was runner-up in the Australian Open pairs in 2011 and made his international debut in 2018.

In 2017, he won the Hong Kong International Bowls Classic singles and pairs titles, the latter with Ben Twist.
