= Ken Woods =

Australian lawn bowler

Personal information
- Nationality: Australia
- Born: 30 July 1942

Sport
- Club: ACT

Ken Woods (born 1942) is a former Australian international lawn bowler.

He lost out on a bronze medal in the fours with Denis Dalton, Dennis Katunarich and Rex Johnston at the 1990 Commonwealth Games in Auckland after being defeated by New Zealand in the bronze play off match.

He was inducted into the Australian Hall of Fame.
