= Helen Cheung =

Hong Kong lawn bowler

Personal information
- Nationality: Hongkonger, Chinese

Sport
- Sport: Lawn and indoor bowls
- Club: Kowloon Cricket Club

Achievements and titles
- Highest world ranking: 8 (August 2026)
Medal record
Representing Hong Kong
Bowls World Cup
| Gold medal – first place | 2025 Kuala Lumpur | pairs |
Asian Lawn Bowls Championship
| Gold medal – first place | 2014 Shenzhen | pairs |

Helen Cheung is a female international Hong Kong Chinese lawn bowler. She reached a career high ranking of world number 8 in August 2026.

== Bowls career ==
Cheung came to prominence when making her international debut for Hong Kong at the 2012 Hong Kong International Bowls Classic and was named the Hong Kong bowler of the year.

In 2014, Cheung won the pairs gold medal, with Dorothy Yu at the Asian Lawn Bowls Championship.

Cheung was selected to represent Hong Kong, China for the singles and triples events at the 2020 World Outdoor Bowls Championship in Australia but the event was cancelled due to the COVID-19 pandemic. She did however take part in the 2023 World Outdoor Bowls Championship, competing in the pairs and fours, reaching the quarter finals of the latter.

In November 2025, partnering Cheryl Chan, she won the pairs gold medal at the 2025 Bowls World Cup in Kula Lumpur, defeating New Zealanders Selina Goddard and Katelyn Inch in the final.

Cheung is a four-time champion of Hong Kong, having won the 2018 and 2020 singles, the 2024 triples and the 2020 fours at the Hong Kong National Bowls Championships.
