= Dorothy Yu =

Hong Kong lawn bowler

Personal information
- Nationality: Hongkonger, Chinese
- Born: c.1975

Sport
- Sport: Lawn and indoor bowls
Medal record
Representing Hong Kong
Asian Lawn Bowls Championship
Gold medal – first place	2014 Shenzhen	singles
Gold medal – first place	2014 Shenzhen	pairs
Hong Kong International Classic
Gold medal – first place	2015	singles
Silver medal – second place	2016	singles
Gold medal – first place	2025	singles

Dorothy Yu Kin-shan (born c.1975) is a female international Hong Kong Chinese lawn and indoor bowler.

== Biography ==
In 2014, Yu won double gold at the Asian Lawn Bowls Championship in Shenzhen, in the singles and the pairs with Helen Cheung.

Yu won the prestigious 2015 Hong Kong International Bowls Classic singles title defeating Millicent Lai in the final.

In 2023, she was selected as part of the team to represent Hong Kong, China at the 2023 World Bowls Indoor Championships. She participated in the women's singles and the women's pairs events. In the singles, she won her group before losing her quarter final to Katelyn Inch of New Zealand.

In 2025, Yu won the singles title for the second time at the Hong Kong International Classic.

Yu has won five national titles at the Hong Kong National Bowls Championships; the singles in 2014 and 2016, the pairs in 2018 and 2019 and the fours in 2012.
