= Emma Firyana Saroji =

Malaysian lawn bowler (born 1986)

Emma Firyana Saroji AKS
Personal information
- Nationality: Malaysian
- Born: 21 October 1986 (age 39) Selangor, Malaysia
- Height: 5 ft 2 in (157 cm)
- Weight: 54 kg (119 lb)

Sport
- Turned pro: 2005

Achievements and titles
- Highest world ranking: 1 (August 2026)
Medal record
Women's lawn bowls
Representing Malaysia
Commonwealth Games
Gold medal – first place	2018 Gold Coast	pairs
Silver medal – second place	2014 Glasgow	fours
Bowls World Cup
Gold medal – first place	2025 Kuala Lumpur	singles
World Champion of Champions
Gold medal – first place	2015 Brisbane	singles
Silver medal – second place	2017 Sydney	singles
World Cup Singles
Bronze medal – third place	2011 Warilla	singles
World Bowls Indoor Championships
Bronze medal – third place	2025 Aberdeen	singles
Asia Pacific Bowls Championships
Silver medal – second place	2015 Christchurch	pairs
Bronze medal – third place	2015 Christchurch	fours
Southeast Asian Games
Gold medal – first place	2007 Khorat	pairs
Gold medal – first place	2017 Kuala Lumpur	singles
Gold medal – first place	2019 Philippines	pairs
Asian Lawn Bowls Championship
Gold medal – first place	2012 Kuala Lumpur	singles
Gold medal – first place	2012 Kuala Lumpur	pairs
Gold medal – first place	2018 Xinxiang	pairs

Sgt. Emma Firyana binti Saroji AKS (born 21 October 1986) is a Malaysian lawn bowler who reached a world ranking of number 1 in August 2026.

== Biography ==
Saroji competed in both the women's triples and women's fours events at the 2014 Commonwealth Games. She failed to qualify from the group stages in the women's triples event but won a silver medal in the women's fours In 2015 she won the World Singles Champion of Champions in Brisbane, defeating Nicolene Neal in the final. She also won two medals at the 2015 Asia Pacific Bowls Championships in Christchurch and has won three gold medals in the Lawn bowls at the Southeast Asian Games.

In 2018, she was selected as part of the Malaysian team for the 2018 Commonwealth Games on the Gold Coast in Queensland where she claimed a gold medal in the Pairs with Siti Zalina Ahmad.

In 2020, she was selected for the 2020 World Outdoor Bowls Championship in Australia.

In 2022, she competed in the women's pairs and the Women's fours at the 2022 Commonwealth Games.

After winning the 2024 Malaysian national indoor singles she subsequently won the bronze medal at the 2025 World Bowls Indoor Championships in Aberdeen.

In November 2025, she won the gold medal at the 2025 Bowls World Cup, defeating Katherine Rednall in the final. After reaching the semi final of the women's singles at the 2026 Commonwealth Games she reached a world ranking of number 1.

== Awards and accolades ==
- Darjah Kebesaran Ahli Kegemilangan Sukan Selangor (AKS) (2018)
