= Kelly McKerihen =

Canadian lawn bowler

Personal information
- Born: 5 May 1986 (age 40) Toronto, Ontario, Canada

Sport
- Sport: Lawn bowls
- Club: Clayton BC / Port Credit LBC

Achievements and titles
- Highest world ranking: 1 (December 2024)
Medal record
Representing Canada
World Outdoor Championships
Bronze medal – third place	2012 Adelaide	singles
Bronze medal – third place	2016 Christchurch	singles
Silver medal – second place	2023 Gold Coast	singles
Bowls World Cup
Bronze medal – third place	2025 Kuala Lumpur	pairs
Atlantic Bowls Championships
Bronze medal – third place	2007 Ayr	triples
Bronze medal – third place	2007 Ayr	fours
Hong Kong International Classic
Gold medal – first place	2024	pairs

Kelly McKerihen (born 5 May 1986) is a Canadian International lawn bowler. She reached a career high ranking of world number 1 in December 2024.

== Biography ==
In 2007, McKerihen won the triples and fours bronze medals at the Atlantic Bowls Championships.

She won a bronze medal in the Women's singles at the 2012 World Outdoor Bowls Championship in Adelaide. Four years later in 2016, she won a bronze medal at the 2016 World Outdoor Bowls Championship in Christchurch in the singles.

In November 2017, McKerihen was named to Canada's 2018 Commonwealth Games team.

In 2020, she was selected for the 2020 World Outdoor Bowls Championship in Australia but the event was cancelled due to the COVID-19 pandemic. In 2022, she competed in the women's triples and the Women's fours at the 2022 Commonwealth Games.

In 2023, she was selected again as part of the team to represent Canada at the 2023 World Outdoor Bowls Championship. She participated in the women's singles and the women's pairs events. In the singles, McKerihen qualified unbeaten in first place in her group before advancing to the semi final stage, where she beat Katherine Rednall to set up a final against Tayla Bruce, where McKerihen lost 21–18.

In 2024, McKerihen won the pairs title at the New Zealand National Bowls Championships followed by the Australian Open fours title with Leanne Chinery, Louise Cronan and Emma Boyd. Then she won the Australian National Bowls Championships singles in October and in November 2024, McKerihen won the Hong Kong International Classic pairs with Boyd. McKerihen ended 2024 as the number 1 ranked bowler in the world.

== Personal life ==
Her father is Steve McKerihen.
