= Tony Cheung =

Hong Kong international bowls player

Personal information
- Nationality: Hongkonger, Chinese

Sport
- Sport: Bowls
- Club: Hong Kong FC/Kowloon BC
Medal record
Representing Hong Kong
Asia Pacific Bowls Championships
Bronze medal – third place	2015 Christchurch	fours
Bronze medal – third place	2019 Gold Coast	singles

Tony Cheung is an international Hong Kong lawn bowler.

== Bowls career ==
Cheung won a fours bronze medal in the 2015 Asia Pacific Bowls Championships. He finished runner-up in the 2018 World Singles Champion of Champions losing to Shannon McIlroy in the final and the following year he reached the final again but lost to Lee Schraner. In 2019, he also won singles bronze at the 2019 Asia Pacific Bowls Championships in the Gold Coast, Queensland.

In 2020, he was selected for the 2020 World Outdoor Bowls Championship in Australia but the event was cancelled due to the COVID-19 pandemic.

In 2023, he was selected as part of the team to represent Hong Kong at the 2023 World Outdoor Bowls Championship. He participated in the men's singles and the men's pairs events. In the singles, he qualified from his group but then lost to Gary Kelly at the quarter final stage.

In 2024, Cheung won his fifth national title after winning the pairs with Danny Ho at the National Championships.

== Personal life ==
He is an engineer by trade.
