= John Snell (bowls) =

Australian lawn bowler (born 1934)

Personal information
- Nationality: Australia
- Born: 18 September 1934 (age 91)

Sport
- Sport: Lawn bowls
Medal record
Representing Australia
World Outdoor Bowls Championships
Silver medal – second place	1980 Frankston	Singles
Silver medal – second place	1980 Frankston	Team
Commonwealth Games
Silver medal – second place	1978 Edmonton	singles

Sydney John Snell (born 18 September 1934) is an Australian former international lawn bowler.

== Bowls career ==
Snell won double silver at the 1980 World Outdoor Bowls Championship in Frankston; in the team event (Leonard Trophy) and the singles competition.

He also won a silver medal in the singles at the 1978 Commonwealth Games in Edmonton.
