= Danny Ho =

Hong Kong lawn bowler

Personal information
- Nationality: Hongkonger

Sport
- Club: Kowloon CC
Medal record
Representing Hong Kong
Asia Pacific Bowls Championships
Silver medal – second place	1985 Tweed Heads	fours
Silver medal – second place	1993 Victoria	fours
Bronze medal – third place	1995 Dunedin	triples
Representing Hong Kong
Bronze medal – third place	2003 Brisbane	triples
Silver medal – second place	2007 Christchurch	pairs
Bronze medal – third place	2007 Christchurch	fours
Bronze medal – third place	2009 Kuala Lumpur	triples

Danny Ho is a former Hong Kong international lawn bowler.

== Bowls career ==
Ho has represented Hong Kong at the Commonwealth Games, in the fours event at the 1986 Commonwealth Games.

He won three silver and four bronze medals at the Asia Pacific Bowls Championships.

In 2024, Ho won his fourth national title after winning the pairs with Tony Cheung at the National Championships.
