= Gloria Ha =

Hong Kong Chinese lawn bowler

Personal information
- Nationality: Hong Kong, China
- Born: 2002

Sport
- Club: Hong Kong Youth Development Team
Medal record
Representing Hong Kong
Asia Pacific Bowls Championships
Bronze medal – third place	2019 Gold Coast	fours
WB Indoor Championships
Silver medal – second place	2022 Bristol	singles

Gloria Yat Ting Ha (born 2002) is a female international Hong Kong Chinese lawn bowler.

== Bowls career ==
Ha made her debut for Hong Kong in 2015 and won a bronze medal in the fours with Angel So, Phyllis Wong and Cheryl Chan at the 2019 Asia Pacific Bowls Championships, held in the Gold Coast, Queensland.

At the age of just 14 she was selected for Hong Kong at the 2016 World Outdoor Bowls Championship in New Zealand. In 2022, Ha won a silver medal at the inaugural World Bowls Indoor Championships in the singles, she was defeated in the final by Julie Forrest.

In 2023, she won her second national singles title.

Later in 2023, she was selected as part of the team to represent Hong Kong at the 2023 World Outdoor Bowls Championship. She participated in the women's singles and the women's triples events. In the singles, Ha finished second in her group before losing the quarter final to Kelly McKerihen.

In 2024, Ha successfully retained her singles crown at the National Championships.
