= Alan Windsor =

English international lawn and indoor bowler

Personal information
- Nationality: British (English)
- Born: 12 January 1945 (age 81) Derby

Sport
- Sport: Lawn & indoor bowls
- Club: Woking Park BC (outdoors); Wey Valley (indoors)
Medal record
Representing England
World Indoor Bowls Championships
Bronze medal – third place	1981 Coatbridge	singles

Alan J. Windsor (born 1945) is a former English international lawn and indoor bowler.

== Bowls career ==
=== World Indoor Championships ===
He won the bronze medal in the 1980 World Indoor Bowls Championship. His first cap for England was in 1973 (outdoors) and 1974 (indoors).

=== Commonwealth Games ===
He represented England at the 1982 Commonwealth Games in the singles, at the 1982 Commonwealth Games in Brisbane, Queensland, Australia.

=== National ===
In 1981, he was runner-up to Andy Thomson in the national singles.

== Personal life ==
By trade he was a school caretaker.
