= Jock Thompson (bowls) =

Scottish-born Welsh lawn bowler (1920–2000)

Personal information
- Nationality: Scottish / Welsh
- Born: 16 February 1920 Hawick, Scotland
- Died: February 2000 (aged 80) Glamorgan, Wales

Sport
- Sport: Lawn bowls
- Club: Rhiwbina BC
Medal record
Representing Wales
Commonwealth Games
Bronze medal – third place	1978 Edmonton	men's fours
British Isles Championships
Gold medal – first place	1983	pairs
Gold medal – first place	1966	fours

John Dawson Hedley Thompson (16 February 1920 – February 2000) was a Scottish-born Welsh international lawn bowler who won a bronze medal at the Commonwealth Games.

== Biography ==
Introduced to bowls by his father in 1938 and moved to Wales at the end of World War II. Thompson was a Welsh international from 1961 to 1973 and captain from 1966 to 1968. Thompson bowled for and captained Wales in the 1966 World Outdoor Bowls Championship in New South Wales, Australia.

Thompson won the 1965 fours title and 1982 pairs title at the British Isles Bowls Championships and the Welsh National Bowls Championships, when bowling for the Rhiwbina Bowls Club.

Thompson was a civil servant by trade represented the Welsh team at the 1974 British Commonwealth Games in Christchurch, New Zealand, where he competed in the pairs event, with Ellis Stanbury.

Four years later he won a bronze medal in the men's fours at the 1978 Commonwealth Games in Edmonton with Ellis Stanbury, Gwyn Evans and Ian Sutherland.

Thompson died in Glamorgan in February 2000, at the age of 80.
