= Alf Sandercock =

Australian lawn bowler

Personal information
- Nationality: Australia
- Born: 29 August 1924 Saddleworth, South Australia
- Died: 21 August 2007 (aged 82) Maitland, South Australia

Sport
- Sport: Lawn bowls
Medal record
Representing Australia
World Outdoor Championships
Gold medal – first place	1980 Melbourne	Men's pairs
Silver medal – second place	1980 Melbourne	Men's team

Alfred 'Alf' Norman Sandercock (1924–2007) was an Australian international lawn bowler.

== Bowls career ==
=== World Bowls Championship ===
Sandercock won the pairs gold medal at the 1980 World Outdoor Bowls Championship in Frankston, Victoria with bowls partner Peter Rheuben. He also won a silver medal in the team event (Leonard Trophy).

=== National ===
Sandercock was the 1978 National Singles champion and represented Australia 73 times and South Australia 198 times.

== Awards ==
He was inducted into the Australian Hall of Fame.
