= Ray Williams (bowls) =

Lawn bowls player (born 1949)

Personal information
- Nationality: British (Welsh)
- Born: 1951 Bedwas, Wales

Sport
- Sport: Lawn bowls
- Club: Islwyn BC, Pontymister Ath BC, Bedwas & Trethomas BC and Senghydd BC
Medal record
Representing Wales
Commonwealth Games
Bronze medal – third place	1978 Edmonton	men's pairs

Ray Williams (born c. 1951), is a former Welsh international lawn bowls player.

== Biography ==
In 1975, Williams was a member of the Bedwas Bowls Club.

Williams, an assistant transport manager at the time, was the Monmouthshire open champion and represented Wales at the 1976 World Outdoor Bowls Championship in South Africa.

He won a bronze medal in the men's pairs at the 1978 Commonwealth Games in Edmonton with Jim Morgan.

Four years later he represented Wales again in the fours event at the 1982 Commonwealth Games. In 1983, after 24 caps for Wales, he received a 20-month suspended ban for misconduct (drunken behaviour) at the 1982 Commonwealth Games.
