= 1980 World Indoor Bowls Championship =

Bowls championship held in Coatbridge, North Lanarkshire

World Indoor Championships 1980
- 2nd World Indoor Bowls Championships
- Location: (Scotland) Coatbridge, North Lanarkshire
- Date(s): 25 February – 2 March, 1980.
- Category: World Indoor Championships

The 1980 Embassy World Indoor Bowls Championship was held at the Coatbridge indoor bowling club, North Lanarkshire, Scotland, from 25 February to 2 March 1980.

David Bryant won his second consecutive title beating Philip Chok in the final.

== Men's singles ==
=== Group stages ===
Group A results

Player 1	Player 2	Score
Bryant	Greer	21-13
Bryant	Yates	21-14
Bryant	Jones	12-21
Bryant	Windsor	21-14
Windsor	Greer	16-21
Windsor	Yates	21-6
Windsor	Jones	21-3
Greer	Yates	21-17
Greer	Jones	13-21
Yates	Jones	21-10

Pos	Player	P	W
1	(England) David Bryant	4	3
2	(England) Alan Windsor	4	2
3	(Canada) Ronnie Jones	4	2
4	(Australia) Jim Yates	4	1
5	(Republic of Ireland) Jim Greer	4	1

Group B results

Player 1	Player 2	Score
Chok	Watson	21-19
Chok	Hindmarsh	21-11
Chok	MacWilliams	21-7
Chok	Mears	21-8
Watson	Hindmarsh	21-2
Watson	MacWilliams	21-2
Watson	Mears	21-7
Hindmarsh	MacWilliams	21-2
Hindmarsh	Mears	21-20
MacWilliams	Mears	21-17

Pos	Player	P	W
1	(Hong Kong) Philip Chok	4	4
2	(Scotland) John Watson	4	3
3	(Wales) George Hindmarsh	4	2
4	(United States) Bert MacWilliams	4	1
5	(New Zealand) John Mears	4	0

=== Medal round ===
Semi-finals
(England) David Bryant	21
(Scotland) John Watson	16
(Hong Kong) Philip Chok	21
(England) Alan Windsor	14

Gold medal match
(England) David Bryant	21
(Hong Kong) Philip Chok	15
Third place
(England) Alan Windsor	21
(Scotland) John Watson	8
