= Slawee Kadir =

Hong Kong hockey player

Personal information
- Nationality: Hong Konger
- Born: 28 June 1933 (age 92)

Sport
- Sport: Field hockey / Lawn Bowls

Slawee Kadir (born 28 June 1933) is a former Hong Kong field hockey and Lawn bowls player. He competed at the 1964 Summer Olympics.

== Career ==
Kadir appeared at the 1964 Olympic Games, where he competed in the men's tournament field hockey tournament at the 1964 Olympics Games, in Tokyo, Japan. He also represented Hong Kong at Hockey in 1962 and 1966 Asian Games.

Kadir started bowling in 1953 and won three national titles at the Hong Kong National Bowls Championships. He won the fours in 1985, 1992 and 1993 representing the Indian Recreation Club.

== Personal life ==
Kadir is a retired as a prison officer.
