= Ron Taylor (bowls) =

Australian lawn bowler

Personal information
- Nationality: Australia

Sport
- Sport: Lawn bowls
- Club: Mandurah Bowling & Recreation Club
Medal record
Representing Australia
World Outdoor Championships
Silver medal – second place	1980 Melbourne	Men's team

Ron Taylor is a former Australian international lawn bowler.

== Bowls career ==
=== World Bowls Championship ===
Taylor won the team event (Leonard Trophy) silver medal at the 1980 World Outdoor Bowls Championship in Frankston, Victoria.

=== National ===
Taylor represented Western Australia 180 times and was the Mandurah Bowling and Recreation Club champion 29 times (3 singles, 10 pairs, 6 triples, 10 fours).

=== Awards ===
He was indicted into the WA Bowls Hall of Fame in 2006.
