= John Malcolm (bowls) =

New Zealand lawn bowler

Personal information
- Nationality: New Zealand
Medal record
Representing New Zealand
World Outdoor Championships
Bronze medal – third place	1980 Melbourne	triples
Bronze medal – third place	1980 Melbourne	fours
British Commonwealth Games
Silver medal – second place	1978 Edmonton	fours

John Malcolm is a former New Zealand international lawn bowler.

He won a bronze medal in the triples and a bronze medal in the fours at the 1980 World Outdoor Bowls Championship in Melbourne.

In addition, he won a silver medal in the fours at the 1978 Commonwealth Games in Edmonton.
