= Angel So =

Hong Kong lawn bowler

Personal information
- Nationality: Hongkonger, Chinese

Sport
- Club: Craigengower Cricket Club
Medal record
Representing Hong Kong
Asia Pacific Bowls Championships
Bronze medal – third place	2019 Gold Coast	fours

Angel So Ka-he is a female international Hong Kong Chinese lawn bowler.

== Bowls career ==
So won a bronze medal in the fours with Gloria Ha, Phyllis Wong and Cheryl Chan at the 2019 Asia Pacific Bowls Championships, held in the Gold Coast, Queensland.

In 2020, she was selected for the sport's blue riband event, the 2020 World Outdoor Bowls Championship in Australia but the event was cancelled due to the COVID-19 pandemic.

In 2023, she was selected as part of the team to represent Hong Kong at the 2023 World Outdoor Bowls Championship. She participated in the women's pairs and the women's fours events. In the fours, her team reached the quarter final before being beaten by Australia.

In 2024, So won her second pairs crown with Andrea Chan at the National Championships, previously having won the event in 2017.
