= Peter Rheuben =

Australian lawn bowler (1931–2014)

Personal information
- Nationality: Australia
- Born: 1931 Sydney
- Died: 4 April 2014, aged 83

Sport
- Sport: Lawn bowls
- Club: Ryde BC
Medal record
Representing Australia
World Outdoor Championships
Gold medal – first place	1980 Melbourne	Men's pairs
Silver medal – second place	1980 Melbourne	Men's team
Commonwealth Games
Bronze medal – third place	1982 Brisbane	Men's pairs

Peter Alan Rheuben (1931–2014) was an Australian international lawn bowler.

== Bowls career ==
=== World Championship ===
Rheuben won the pairs gold medal at the 1980 World Outdoor Bowls Championship in Frankston, Victoria with bowls partner Alf Sandercock. He also won a silver medal in the team event (Leonard Trophy).

=== Commonwealth Games ===
Rheuben represented Australia at the 1974 British Commonwealth Games in Christchurch, New Zealand and the 1982 Commonwealth Games where he won a bronze medal in the pairs with Denis Dalton.

== Personal life ==
He was a company director by trade and also represented Eastwood Rugby Club and New South Wales in rugby union against the British Lions in 1953.

== Awards ==
He was inducted into the Australian Hall of Fame.
