= Selangor honours list =

Selangor is one of the states in Malaysia that awards honours and titles.

== 2000 ==
- Abdullah Ahmad Badawi is sole recipient of Sri Paduka Mahkota Selangor (SPMS) award which carries the title Datuk Seri.
- 2 recipients of Datuk Seri Sultan Salahuddin Abdul Aziz Shah (SSSA) which also carries the title Datuk Seri.
- 20 recipients of Datuk Paduka Mahkota Selangor (DPMS) which carries the title Datuk.
- 65 recipients of Datuk Sultan Salahuddin Abdul Aziz Shah (DSSA) which also carries the title Datuk.

== 2001 ==
- 2 recipients of Sri Paduka Mahkota Selangor (SPMS) award which carries the title Datuk Seri.
- 2 recipients of Datuk Seri Sultan Salahuddin Abdul Aziz Shah (SSSA) which also carries the title Datuk Seri.
- 20 recipients of Datuk Paduka Mahkota Selangor (DPMS) which carries the title Datuk.
- 66 recipients of Datuk Sultan Salahuddin Abdul Aziz Shah (DSSA) which also carries the title Datuk.

== 2002 ==
- 2 recipients of Sri Paduka Mahkota Selangor (SPMS) award which carries the title Datuk Seri.
- 2 recipients of Datuk Setia Sultan Sharaffudin Idris Shah (SSIS) award which carries the title Datuk Setia.
- 18 recipients of Datuk Paduka Mahkota Selangor (DPMS) which carries the title Datuk.
- 20 recipients of Datuk Sultan Sharafuddin Idris Shah (DSIS) which also carries the title Datuk.

== 2003 ==
- 2 recipients of Sri Paduka Mahkota Selangor (SPMS) award which carries the title Datuk Seri.
- 2 recipients of Datuk Setia Sultan Sharaffudin Idris Shah (SSIS) award which carries the title Datuk Setia.
- 18 recipients of Datuk Paduka Mahkota Selangor (DPMS) which carries the title Datuk.
- 9 recipients of Datuk Sultan Sharafuddin Idris Shah (DSIS) which also carries the title Datuk.

== 2015 ==
The 2015 Selangor State Honours and Awards ceremony was held on 12 December 2015 at Istana Alam Shah, Klang. Below are the list of recipients of the honours and titles:

=== Royal Family Order of Selangor ===
- Syed Anwar Tuanku Syed Putra Jamalulail, the Tengku Syarif Panglima Perlis

=== Order of the Crown of Selangor ===
==== Knight Grand Commander ====
- Azmin Ali, the 15th Menteri Besar of Selangor

==== Knight Commander ====
- Mohd Na'im Mokhtar, the Chief Judge of Selangor's Syariah Court
- Nik Shuhaimi Nik Sulaiman, the Selangor state's legal advisor
- Afifi Al-Akiti, Orang Besar Lapan Perak
- Zainul Rashid Mohamad Razi, the Deputy Dean of Graduate and International Relations of Pusat Perubatan Universiti Kebangsaan Malaysia
- S. Balachandran, the director of Selangor's Health Department
- Puasa Md Taib, President of Sepang Municipal Council
- Mohd Zaki Ibrahim, director of Selangor's Town and Rural Planning Department
- Nazir Razak, chairman of CIMB Group Holdings

==== Member ====
- Tengku Ezrique Ezzuddean Tengku Ardy Esfandiari, member of Selangor royal family
- Tuan Abdul Malik Soleh, a judge in Selangor's Syariah Judiciary Department
- Major Khalid Yaacob, the administration staff officer 2 at the medical headquarter of Malaysian Armed Forces
- Lieutenant Commander Azlina Ahmad Zaini, the staff officer 2 of women's affairs (A) and secretary of BAKAT (L) in Royal Malaysian Navy
- Noor Asdiana Abdul Kadir, the corporate secretary in Selangor state government's secretariat office
- Rahilah Rahmat, the chief assistant district officer of Klang Land and District Office
- Idris Ramli, the chief assistant director of Jabatan Agama Islam Selangor (JAIS)
- Abdul Karim Jabar, the vice director of education policy planning and research division in the Ministry of Education
- Noor Huda Roslan, the chief registrar of Selangor's Syariah Judiciary Department
- Mas Sakdah Kamaruzzaman, the chief assistant secretary of the Human Resource Management Division at the Selangor State Secretary's office
- Mohd Shahrizal Mohd Salleh, the chief assistant financial officer of the Selangor State Treasury
- Fatimah Sham, director of UiTM Shah Alam's University Community Transformation Center (UCTC)
- Surya Wati Shawal, legal officer of Petaling Jaya Sessions/Magistrate Court
- Mohamad Zin Masod, corporate director of Selayang Municipal Council
- N. Jeeva, the general manager of internal audit of the Social Security Organization (SOCSO)

=== Order of Sultan Sharafuddin Idris Shah ===
==== Knight Grand Companion ====
- Tengku Azman Shah, member of Selangor Council of the Royal Court
- Mohd Zawawi Salleh, judge of the Court of Appeal
- Muhammed Khusrin Munawi, Selangor state secretary

==== Knight Companion ====
- Raja Reza Raja Zaid Shah, Malaysia's Deputy Permanent Representative to the United Nations (UN) in New York
- Ong Thiam Hock, the Deputy Fleet Commander of the Royal Malaysian Navy
- Saadah Ismail, the Deputy Vice Chancellor of Industry, Community and Alumni Network of Universiti Teknologi MARA
- Nooral Zeila Junid, a public health dental specialist in Planning Division of the Ministry of Health
- Ang Nai Har, the director of the Selangor National Audit Department
- Abdul Jalil Nordin, the Dean of the Faculty of Medicine, Health Sciences of Universiti Putra Malaysia
- Mohamad Nasir Ab Latif, the deputy chief executive officer (Investment) of Employees Provident Fund (KWSP)
- Azmi Abdul Aziz, the group managing director of Prasarana Malaysia
- Cheah See Yeong, director of MCT Konsortium
- Tan Siok Choo, the recipient of the Honorary Doctoral Degree of Plantation Management in Universiti Putra Malaysia

==== Member ====
- Lieutenant Colonel Mohd Safiee Mohd Yusof, the commanding officer of the Penang's Royal Malaysian Air Force Development and Management Center
- Norliza Zulkifli, the senior federal counsel of the Selangor Legal Advisory Room
- Mohd Faizal Abdul Raji, the chief assistant district officer of the Kuala Selangor Land and District Office
- Zailani Panot, the Klang Municipal Council's town and country planning officer
- Mohd Wazir Abdul Gani, the marketing manager of Selangor State Development Corporation (PKNS)
- Mohd Basri Abdul Manaf, the chief assistant director general of Selangor Forestry Department
- Mohd Azhar Sarid @ Mohd Sharif, Shah Alam City Council's administrative officer
- Suhaimi Sabran, the school improvement specialist coaching officer at the Sabak Bernam District Education Office
- Zainal Abidin Sulaiman, the religious administrative officer/senior registrar of JAIS
- Azman Dahlan, the secretary of Hulu Selangor District Council
- Anizan Ibrahim, the Hostel Manager of Yayasan Selangor Klang
- Nurhani Salwa Jamaluddin, Selangor Islamic Religious Council's (MAIS) legal advisor
- Zainuddin Tasiman, Raja Tun Uda Public Library's administrative officer
- Mohamed Idris Haron, the assistant medical officer of Kuala Lumpur and Putrajaya Health Department
- Mohd Asari Daud, the assistant medical officer of the Department of Anesthesiology and Intensive Care at Tengku Ampuan Rahimah Hospital (HTAR)

=== Distinguished Service Star ===
- Sub-inspector Md Punzan Yusof, Sub-inspector of welfare
- S. Sivaraja, the head of Industrial Relations Branch of Peretak's National Youth Skills Institute (IKBN)
- Faizah Mohd Shafawi, the assistant financial officer at the Selangor State Treasury
- Mohammad Khair Mahidin, the education management supervisor of the Klang Islamic Religious Department
- Mohd Azman Mohd Amin, the assistant auditor of the Internal Audit Division at the Selangor State Secretary's Office
- Abd Rahim Jantan, the assistant land officer of Hulu Selangor District and Land Office
- Saadah Mohd Sekak, the senior administrative assistant (retired) of Selangor State Secretary's Office Management Services Division

== 2019 ==
The 2019 Selangor State Honours and Awards ceremony was held on 11 December 2019 at Istana Alam Shah, Klang. Below are the list of recipients of the honours and titles:

=== Order of the Crown of Selangor ===
==== Knight Grand Commander ====
- Amirudin Shari, the 16th Menteri Besar of Selangor

==== Knight Commander ====
- Mohamad Adib Husain, Selangor Syariah Chief Judge
- Nur Ashikin Mohd Taib, Malaysian Ambassador to Sweden
- Vice Admiral Datuk Abdul Rahman Ayob, deputy chief of Royal Malaysian Navy
- Major General Datuk Badrul Hisham Muhammad, Army Headquarters Assistant Chief of Staff
- Datuk Ir Hashim Osman, Selangor Water Authority (LUAS) director
- Datuk Yeoh Seok Hong, YTL Power International Berhad managing director
- Zamani Ahmad Mansor, Selangor deputy State Secretary (Management)
- Professor Dr Zulkifli Idrus, Universiti Putra Malaysia deputy vice-chancellor (Research and Innovation)
- Zulkiflee Othman, Universiti Putra Malaysia Bursar

==== Companion ====
- Captain Mahadzir Mokhtar, head of Operations and Construction Division of the Royal Malaysian Navy Headquarters
- Colonel Idros Muhammad, Malaysian Army headquarters Royal Intelligence Corps director
- Mohd Faizal Abdul Raji, Kuala Selangor Land and District Office district officer

=== Order of Sultan Sharafuddin Idris Shah ===
==== Knight Grand Companion ====
- Professor Datin Paduka Dr Aini Ideris, vice-chancellor of Universiti Putra Malaysia

==== Knight Companion ====
- Syed Haizam Hishamuddin Putra Jamalullail Syed Anwar Jamalullail, Engku Panglima Setia Diraja Selangor
- Raja Muzaffar Raja Redzwa, Engku Orang Kaya Maha Bijaya Hulu Selangor
- First Admiral Shamsuddin Ludin, assistant Chief of Communications and Electronics Division of Malaysian Armed Forces headquarters
- Rear Admiral Hanafiah Hassan, director-general of National Hydrographic Centre
- Senior Assistant Commissioner Fadzil Ahmat, Selangor CID chief
- Datuk Mohd Khay Ibrahim, Zikay Group Berhad Group managing director
- Ahmad Fasal Zakaria, Selangor Sultan's Office protocol officer
- Yap Chong Heong, Tanjung Balai Group director

==== Companion ====
- Tengku Munazirah Tengku Abdul Samad Shah Alhaj, founder of Hope Factory Malaysia and the Sultan's niece
- Commander Zailara Zainal, assistant Chief of Engineering Services, Western Naval Logistics Headquarters Royal Malaysian Navy
- Zamri Abdul Rahman, Worldwide Holdings Berhad chief operating officer (environment)
