= 2025 Bowls World Cup =

Bowls event

- Venue: Bukit Kiara Arena
- Location: Kuala Lumpur, Malaysia
- Dates: 4 – 8 November 2025
- Nations: 12

The 2025 Bowls World Cup organised by World Bowls was the inaugural edition of the Bowls World Cup held from 4 to 8 November 2025 at the Bukit Kiara Arena in Kuala Lumpur, Malaysia.

It was contested between bowlers from the world's 12 leading ranked nations and is regarded as the third most important bowls event of the calendar behind the World Bowls Championship and Commonwealth Games.

The first venue consisted of four 36 metre indoor portable rinks, with covered carpet. An indoor location was chosen because of the similarities that the Bowls at the 2026 Commonwealth Games will experience.

== Winners ==
Event	Gold	Silver	Bronze
Men's singles	(England) Sam Tolchard	(India) Dinesh Kumar	(Australia) Corey Wedlock (Malaysia) Izzat Dzulkeple
Men's pairs	(Wales) Wales; Daniel Davies Jr. & Ross Owen	(Scotland) Scotland; Paul Foster & Jason Banks	Ireland; Adam McKeown & Ryan McElroy; Hong Kong China; James Po & Ko Ha Lee
Women's singles	(Malaysia) Emma Firyana Saroji	(England) Katherine Rednall	(Australia) Dawn Hayman (Malaysia) Alyani Jamil
Women's pairs	Hong Kong, China; Helen Cheung & Cheryl Chan	(New Zealand) New Zealand; Selina Goddard & Katelyn Inch	(Canada) Canada; Kelly McKerihen & Emma Boyd; Ireland; Lara Reaney & Chloe Wilson

== Results ==
=== Men's singles ===
First round

Section 1
Pos	Name	Pts
1	(England) Sam Tolchard	12
2	(Hong Kong) Ko Ha Lee	12
3	(Canada) Ryan Bester	9
4	(Scotland) Paul Foster MBE	6
5	(Wales) Ross Owen	3
6	(United States) Loren Dion	3

Section 2
Pos	Name	Pts
1	(India) Dinesh Kumar	12
2	(Malaysia) Soufi Rusli	9
3	Adam McKeown	9
4	(Australia) Aaron Teys	6
5	(New Zealand) Keanu Darby	6
6	(South Africa) Jason Evans	3

Section 3
Pos	Name	Pts
1	(Scotland) Jason Banks	12
2	(Wales) Daniel Davies Jr.	9
3	(Hong Kong) James Po	9
4	(United States) Aaron Zangl	9
5	(England) Jamie Walker	6
6	(Canada) John Bezear	0

Section 4
Pos	Name	Pts
1	(Malaysia) Izzat Dzulkeple	12
2	(Australia) Corey Wedlock	9
3	Ryan McElroy	9
4	(South Africa) Wayne Roberts	6
5	(India) Putul Sonowal	6
6	(New Zealand) Finbar McGuigan	3

Quarter finals

Player 1	Player 2	Score
Tolchard	Rusli	6–3, 4–4
Wedlock	Banks	7–3, 6–5
Kumar	Davies Jr.	6–8, 8–3, 3–0
Dzulkeple	Lee	9–4, 10–5

Semi finals

Player 1	Player 2	Score
Tolchard	Wedlock	8–3, 8–8
Kumar	Dzulkeple	5–5, 7–6

Final

Player 1	Player 2	Score
Tolchard	Kumar	7–2, 7–1

=== Women's singles ===
First round

Section 1
Pos	Name	Pts
1	(Hong Kong) Katherine Rednall	15
2	(Malaysia) Emma Firyana Saroji	9
3	Chloe Wilson	9
4	(South Africa) Anneke Scheepers	6
5	(New Zealand) Katelyn Inch	3
6	(Scotland) Caroline Brown	3

Section 2
Pos	Name	Pts
1	(Australia) Dawn Hayman	12
2	(India) Rupa Rani Tirkey	12
3	(Canada) Kelly McKerihen	6
4	(Hong Kong) Helen Cheung	6
5	(United States) Anne Nunes	6
6	(Wales) Caroline Taylor	3

Section 3
Pos	Name	Pts
1	(Malaysia) Alyani Jamil	15
2	(New Zealand) Selina Goddard	9
3	Lara Reaney	9
4	(England) Emily Kernick	6
5	(Scotland) Sophie McGrouther	3
6	(South Africa) Bridget Herselman	0

Section 4
Pos	Name	Pts
1	(India) Nayanmoni Saikia	12
2	(Hong Kong) Cheryl Chan	9
3	(Australia) Kelsey Cottrell	9
4	(Wales) Amy Williams	6
5	(United States) Janice Bell	6
6	(Canada) Emma Boyd	3

Quarter finals

Player 1	Player 2	Score
Jamil	Chan	7–3, 5–5
Rednall	Tirkey	11–1, 9–6
Hayman	Goddard	8–0, 8–2
Saroji	Saikia	8–1, 7–6

Semi finals

Player 1	Player 2	Score
Rednall	Jamil	6–3, 5–3
Saroji	Hayman	2–10, 6–4, 1–0

Final

Player 1	Player 2	Score
Saroji	Rednall	5–5, 6–5

=== Men's pairs ===
First round

Section 1
Pos	Name	Pts
1	(Wales) Owen & Davies	12
2	McKeown & McElroy	12
3	(India) Sonowal & Kumar	6
4	(Canada) Bester & Bezear	6
5	(England) Walker & Tolchard	6
6	(United States) Zangl & Dion	3

Section 2
Pos	Name	Pts
1	(Scotland) Foster & Banks	15
2	(Hong Kong) Po & Lee	9
3	(Australia) Teys & Wedlock	9
4	(Malaysia) Rusli & Dzulkeple	6
5	(South Africa) Evans & Roberts	3
6	(New Zealand) Darby & McGuigan	3

Semi finals

Player 1	Player 2	Score
Wales	Hong Kong, China	6–0, 4–2
Scotland	Ireland	5–2, 2–5, 1–0

Final

Player 1	Player 2	Score
Wales	Scotland	7–2, 5–1, 2–0

=== Women's pairs ===
First round

Section 1
Pos	Name	Pts
1	(New Zealand) Inch & Goddard	15
2	(Canada) McKerihen & Boyd	9
3	(South Africa) Scheepers & Herselman	9
4	(Wales) Taylor & Williams	6
5	(Malaysia) Saroji & Jamil	3
6	(India) Tirkey & Saikia	3

Section 2
Pos	Name	Pts
1	(Hong Kong) Cheung & Chan	12
2	Reaney & Wilson	9
3	(Scotland) McGrouther & Brown	9
4	(England) Kernick & Rednall	6
5	(Australia) Cottrell & Hayman	6
6	(United States) Nunes & Bell	3

Semi finals

Player 1	Player 2	Score
New Zealand	Ireland	4–2, 4–2
Hong Kong, China	Canada	5–2, 4–2

Final

Player 1	Player 2	Score
Hong Kong, China	New Zealand	5–4, 3–2
