= Rosemary McMahon =

Lawn bowler from Hong Kong

Personal information
- Nationality: Hongkonger
Medal record
Representing Hong Kong
Asia Pacific Bowls Championships
Bronze medal – third place	1985 Tweed Heads	triples
Silver medal – second place	1993 Victoria	fours

Rosemary McMahon is a former Hong Kong international lawn bowler.

== Bowls career ==
McMahon has represented Hong Kong at three Commonwealth Games; in the pairs event at the 1986 Commonwealth Games, in the singles at the 1990 Commonwealth Games and in the singles at the 1994 Commonwealth Games.

She won two medals at the Asia Pacific Bowls Championships.

== Family ==
Her husband Bill McMahon was also an international lawn bowler and their son is Mark McMahon.
