= Willie McQueen (bowls) =

Scottish bowler (died 1993)

Personal information
- Nationality: British (Scottish)
- Born: c.1924
- Died: November 1993 (aged 69) Dalserf, Scotland

Sport
- Sport: Bowls
- Club: Dalserf BC; Blantyre Miners’ Welfare IBC / Lanarskhire IBC
Medal record
Representing Scotland
World Outdoor Championships
Silver medal – second place	1980 Melbourne	triples
Silver medal – second place	1980 Melbourne	fours
Bronze medal – third place	1980 Melbourne	team

Willie McQueen (c.1924 – November 1993) was a Scottish international lawn and indoor and indoor bowler.

== Biography ==
McQueen won a silver medal in the triples, a silver medal in the fours and a bronze medal in the team event (Leonard Trophy) at the 1980 World Outdoor Bowls Championship in Melbourne. He was capped 69 times outdoors for Scotland from 1967 until 1989.

McQueen bowled indoors for the Blantyre Miners' Welfare Indoor Bowling Club and the Lanarskhire IBC and in 1983 set a Scottish record of earning 50 indoor caps. He would go on to make 21 appearances outdoors and 69 indoors for Scotland.

He was given the nickname 'Machine McQueen' by the legendary David Bryant due to his resilience on the bowling greens. By profession he was foreman. He was posthumously inducted into the Scottish Indoor Bowls Hall of Fame in 2016.

He died at his home in Dalserf in November 1993.
