= Bill McMahon =

Hong Kong international lawn bowler

Medal record
Representing (Hong Kong)
Asia Pacific Bowls Championships
Silver medal – second place	1987 Lae	triples

William McMahon is a former Hong Kong international lawn bowler.

== Bowls career ==
McMahon represented Hong Kong at two Commonwealth Games; in the fours event at the 1990 Commonwealth Games and in the pairs event at the 1994 Commonwealth Games.

In 1987 he won a triples silver medal at the Asia Pacific Bowls Championships in Lae, Papua New Guinea.

== Personal life ==
His wife Rosemary McMahon was also an international lawn bowler and his son is Mark McMahon.
