= Stanley Lai =

Hong Kong lawn bowler

Personal information
- Nationality: Hongkonger
- Born: 1965 (age 59–60)

Sport
- Club: Kowloon Bowling Green Club

Stanley Gon Lap Lai (born 1965) is an international lawn bowler from Hong Kong.

== Bowls career ==
Lai came to prominence (as the champion of Hong Kong) representing his nation and winning the silver medal at the 2012 World Singles Champion of Champions. He was denied gold by Muhammad Hizlee Abdul Rais of Malaysia.

The following year, he also claimed a silver medal behind Richard Catton of England at the 2013 Hong Kong International Bowls Classic.
