= Graham Jarvis (bowls) =

Canadian international lawn bowler

Personal information
- Nationality: Canadian
Medal record
Representing Canada
World Outdoor Championships
Silver medal – second place	1980 Melbourne	Men's pairs
Asia Pacific Bowls Championships
Silver medal – second place	1987 Lae	pairs

Graham Jarvis is a Canadian former international lawn bowler.

He won the pairs silver medal at the 1980 World Outdoor Bowls Championship in Frankston, Victoria with bowls partner Burnie Gill.

He won the pairs silver medal at the 1987 Asia Pacific Bowls Championships in Lae, Papua New Guinea.
