= Dennis Katunarich =

Australian lawn bowler

Personal information
- Nationality: Australian
- Born: 11 March 1950

Sport
- Club: Osborne Park BC
Medal record
Representing Australia
Asia Pacific Bowls Championships
| Silver medal – second place | 1985 Tweed Heads | singles |
| Silver medal – second place | 1985 Tweed Heads | pairs |
| Gold medal – first place | 1987 Lae | pairs |
| Bronze medal – third place | 1987 Lae | fours |
| Gold medal – first place | 1989 Suva | pairs |
| Gold medal – first place | 1989 Suva | fours |
| Silver medal – second place | 1991 Kowloon | fours |

Dennis Katunarich (born 1950) is a former Australian international lawn bowler.

== Bowls career ==
Katunarich won seven medals at the Asia Pacific Bowls Championships, including three gold medals in the 1987 pairs at Lae in Papua New Guinea and the 1989 pairs and fours in Suva, Fiji.

He lost out on a bronze medal in the fours with Denis Dalton, Ken Woods and Rex Johnston at the 1990 Commonwealth Games in Auckland when being beaten by New Zealand.

He bowls for the Osborne Park Bowling Club.
