= Ellis Stanbury =

Welsh lawn bowler

Personal information
- Nationality: British (Welsh)
- Born: 22 September 1929 Caerphilly, Wales
- Died: 26 March 2007 (aged 77)

Sport
- Sport: Lawn bowls
- Club: Llanbradach BC (outdoor); Islwyn (indoor)
Medal record
Representing Wales
Commonwealth Games
Bronze medal – third place	1978 Edmonton	fours

Ellis George Stanbury (22 September 1929 – 26 March 2007) was a Welsh international lawn and indoor bowler, and an industrial photographer by trade.

== Biography ==
Stanbury bowled for Llanbradach Bowl Club and represented the Welsh team at the 1974 British Commonwealth Games in Christchurch, New Zealand, where he competed in the pairs event, with John Thompson.

Stanbury toured the United States and Canada with Wales in 1975 and represented Wales at the 1976 World Outdoor Bowls Championship in South Africa.

Two years later won a bronze medal in the fours at the 1978 Commonwealth Games in Edmonton.

Stanbury won the Welsh National Bowls Championships fours title in 1974.
