= Elizabeth Li =

Personal information
- Nationality: Hongkonger
Medal record
Representing (Hong Kong)
Asia Pacific Bowls Championships
Gold medal – first place	2005 Melbourne	triples
Bronze medal – third place	2007 Christchurch	fours

Elizabeth Li is a Hong Kong international lawn bowler.

== Bowls career ==
Elizabeth Li was selected as part of the five woman team by Hong Kong for the 2008 World Outdoor Bowls Championship, which was held in Christchurch, New Zealand.

She won a triples gold medal (with Grace Chu and Camilla Leung), at the 2005 Asia Pacific Bowls Championships, held in Melbourne. Two years later she won a fours bronze at the 2007 event.
