= David Tso =

Hong Kong international lawn bowler

Personal information
- Nationality: Hongkonger
Medal record
Representing Hong Kong
Asia Pacific Bowls Championships
Gold medal – first place	1985 Tweed Heads	triples
Bronze medal – third place	1985 Tweed Heads	singles
Gold medal – first place	1991 Kowloon	triples
Bronze medal – third place	1991 Kowloon	fours
Representing Hong Kong
Bronze medal – third place	1999 Kuala Lumpur	triples
Bronze medal – third place	1999 Kuala Lumpur	fours

David Tso is a former Hong Kong international lawn bowler.

== Bowls career ==
Tso has represented Hong Kong at two Commonwealth Games; in the singles event at the 1982 Commonwealth Games and the pairs event at the 1986 Commonwealth Games.

He won six medals at the Asia Pacific Bowls Championships including two gold medals in the 1985 triples at Tweed Heads, New South Wales and the 1991 triples at Kowloon.

He has won the 1994 pairs with George Souza Jr., at the prestigious Hong Kong International Bowls Classic.
