= Cheryl Chan (bowls) =

Hong Kong lawn bowler

Personal information
- Nationality: Hongkonger, Chinese

Sport
- Sport: Lawn and indoor bowls
- Club: Shatin Sports Association

Achievements and titles
- Highest world ranking: 5 (August 2026)
Medal record
Representing Hong Kong
Bowls World Cup
Gold medal – first place	2025 Kuala Lumpur	pairs
Asia Pacific Bowls Championships
Bronze medal – third place	2019 Gold Coast	fours
Hong Kong International Classic
Gold medal – first place	2024	singles

Cheryl Chan is a female international Hong Kong Chinese lawn bowler. She reached a career high ranking of world number 5 in August 2026.

== Bowls career ==
Chan won a bronze medal in the fours with Gloria Ha, Phyllis Wong and Angel So at the 2019 Asia Pacific Bowls Championships, held in the Gold Coast, Queensland.

In 2020, she was selected for the 2020 World Outdoor Bowls Championship in Australia but the event was cancelled due to the COVID-19 pandemic.

In 2023, she was selected as part of the team to represent Hong Kong at the 2023 World Outdoor Bowls Championship. She participated in the women's triples and the women's fours events. In the fours, her team reached the quarter final before being beaten by Australia.

Chan won the prestigious 2024 Hong Kong International Bowls Classic singles title defeating Rosita Bradborn in the final. In November 2025, partnering Helen Cheung, she won the pairs gold medal at the 2025 Bowls World Cup.
