= Phyllis Wong =

Hogn Kong lawn bowler

Personal information
- Nationality: Hongkonger, Chinese

Sport
- Club: Hong Kong Football Club
Medal record
Representing Hong Kong
Asia Pacific Bowls Championships
Bronze medal – third place	2019 Gold Coast	fours

Phyllis Wong is a female international Hong Kong Chinese lawn bowler.

== Bowls career ==
=== World Championships ===
In 2020, she was selected for the 2020 World Outdoor Bowls Championship in Australia but the event was cancelled due to the COVID-19 pandemic.

In 2023, she was selected as part of the team to represent Hong Kong at the 2023 World Outdoor Bowls Championship. She participated in the women's triples and the women's fours events. In the fours, her team reached the quarter final before being beaten by Australia.

=== Asia Pacific ===
So won a bronze medal in the fours with Gloria Ha, Angel So and Cheryl Chan at the 2019 Asia Pacific Bowls Championships, held in the Gold Coast, Queensland.
