= Burnie Gill =

Canadian former international lawn bowler

Personal information
- Nationality: Canada

Sport
- Club: Port Elgin LBC
Medal record
Representing Canada
World Outdoor Championships
Silver medal – second place	1980 Melbourne	Men's pairs

Burnham "Burnie" Gill is a Canadian former international lawn bowler.

Gill won the pairs silver medal at the 1980 World Outdoor Bowls Championship in Frankston, Victoria with bowls partner Graham Jarvis.
