= John Summers (bowls) =

Personal information
- Nationality: Scotland

Sport
- Sport: Lawn bowls
- Club: Balerno BC
Medal record
Representing Scotland
World Outdoor Championships
| Silver medal – second place | 1980 Melbourne | triples |
| Silver medal – second place | 1980 Melbourne | fours |
| Bronze medal – third place | 1980 Melbourne | team |

John Summers is a former Scottish international lawn and indoor bowler.

== Bowls career ==
He won a silver medal in the triples, a silver medal in the fours and a bronze medal in the team event (Leonard Trophy) at the 1980 World Outdoor Bowls Championship in Melbourne.

== Coaching ==
Summers was appointed East of Scotland Regional coach in 1988 and elected manager of the Scottish Indoor International Team from 1989 to 2000. He was inducted into the Scottish Indoor Bowling Association's Hall of Fame in 2018.

== Personal life ==
He started bowling in 1967 after moving to Balerno with his wife and daughter from Strathaven, Lanarkshire.
