= Grace Chu =

Hong Kong international lawn bowler

Personal information
- Nationality: Hongkonger
Medal record
Representing (Hong Kong)
Asia Pacific Bowls Championships
Gold medal – first place	2005 Melbourne	triples
Bronze medal – third place	2007 Christchurch	fours
Bronze medal – third place	2009 Kuala Lumpur	fours

Grace Chu is a Hong Kong international lawn bowler.

== Bowls career ==
Chu was selected as part of the five woman team by Hong Kong for the 2008 World Outdoor Bowls Championship, which was held in Christchurch, New Zealand.

She won a triples gold medal (with Camilla Leung and Elizabeth Li), at the 2005 Asia Pacific Bowls Championships, held in Melbourne. She then followed this up with two bronze medals at the next two editions of the Championships.
