= Denis Dalton (bowls) =

Australian lawn bowler

Personal information
- Full name: Denis Michael Dalton
- Nationality: Australian
- Born: 6 July 1941
- Died: 6 May 2018 (aged 76)
Medal record
Representing Australia
Men's lawn bowls
Commonwealth Games
| Bronze medal – third place | 1982 Brisbane | Pairs |

Denis Michael Dalton (6 July 1941 - 6 May 2018) was an Australian international lawn bowler.

He won a bronze medal at the 1982 Commonwealth Games in Brisbane for the Men's Pairs, with Peter Rheuben.

Eight years later he lost the bronze medal play off in the fours with Ken Woods, Dennis Katunarich and Rex Johnston at the 1990 Commonwealth Games in Auckland.

He was inducted into the Bowls Australia Hall of Fame in 2022.
