= Philip Chok =

Hong Kong lawn bowler

Personal information
- Nationality: Hongkonger
Medal record
Representing Hong Kong
Commonwealth Games
Gold medal – first place	1978 Edmonton	men's fours
World Outdoor Championships
Gold medal – first place	1980 Melbourne	men's fours
World Indoor Championships
Silver medal – second place	1980 Coatbridge	men's Singles

Philip Chok is a former Hong Kong international lawn and indoor bowler.

== Career ==
Chok won a gold medal in the fours at both the 1980 World Outdoor Bowls Championship in Melbourne and the 1978 Commonwealth Games in Edmonton. He also finished runner-up to the legendary David Bryant in the 1980 World Indoor Bowls Championship.

Chok was one of the founders of the Hong Kong International Bowls Classic in which he won the 1983 & 1984 Hong Kong International Bowls Classic pairs titles.

His younger brother Edwin Chok was also an international lawn bowler and his mother Elvie Chok won the women's pairs gold medal at the 1977 World Outdoor Bowls Championship.
