= Bowls World Cup =

Bowls event

Tournament information
- Sport: Bowls
- Established: 2025
- Administrator: World Bowls
- Website: World Bowls

The World Cup organised by World Bowls is a bowls event inaugurated in 2025. It is contested between bowlers from national bowls organisations and is regarded as the third most important bowls event of the calendar behind the World Bowls Championship and Commonwealth Games.

The first edition was held in Malaysia and featured the world's top 12 ranked nations.

The first venue consisted of four 36 metre indoor portable rinks, with covered carpet. An indoor location was chosen because of the similarities that the Bowls at the 2026 Commonwealth Games will experience, whereas future events will take place outdoors on grass.

== Past winners ==
Year	Venue	Men's singles	Men's pairs	Women's singles	Women's pairs
2025	Bukit Kiara Arena; Kuala Lumpur, Malaysia	(England) Sam Tolchard	(Wales) Daniel Davies Jr. Ross Owen	(Malaysia) Emma Firyana Saroji	(Hong Kong) Helen Cheung; Cheryl Chan
