= Eric Liddell (bowls) =

Australian-Hong Kong bowler

Eric Liddell MBE
Personal information
- Born: 10 August 1924 Bairnsdale, Victoria, Australia
- Died: 28 April 1991 (aged 66) Queensland, Australia
Medal record
Representing Hong Kong
Men's lawn bowls
Commonwealth Games
Gold medal – first place	1978 Edmonton	men's pairs
World Outdoor Championships
Gold medal – first place	1972 Worthing	men's pairs
Gold medal – first place	1980 Melbourne	men's fours

Eric John Liddell MBE (10 August 1924 – 28 April 1991) was an Australian-born Hong Kong international lawn and indoor bowler.

== Bowls career ==
Liddell was born in Bairnsdale, Victoria, on 10 August 1924, to Edward and Victoria Liddell. He served for four and a half years during the Second World War. He emigrated to Hong Kong in 1951 and represented Hong Kong at the 1954 British Empire and Commonwealth Games and competing in six consecutive Commonwealth Games from 1954 until 1978.

He won the gold medal in the pairs with Saco Delgado at the 1972 World Outdoor Bowls Championship in Worthing and eight years later was part of the fours team that won the gold medal at the 1980 World Outdoor Bowls Championship in Melbourne. In between he won the pairs gold once again with Saco Delgado at the 1978 Commonwealth Games.

Following the 1980 World Championships Liddell retired from bowls and returned to live in Australia residing on the Gold Coast.

== Personal life and death ==
He was a chief assistant engineer by trade for the Hong Kong Telephone Company. Liddell later returned to Australia. He died in Queensland on 28 April 1991, at the age of 66.

== Awards ==
In the 1975 New Year Honours, Liddell was appointed a Member of the Order of the British Empire, for services to the blind in Hong Kong. He was senior vice president of the Hong Kong Lawn Bowls Association.
