= Noel Kennedy =

Hong Kong lawn bowler

Noel Joseph Kennedy
Personal information
- Nationality: British
- Born: 23 December 1964 (age 61) Croesyceiliog, Cwmbran, Torfaen, Wales
Medal record
Representing (Hong Kong)
Asia Pacific Bowls Championships
| Silver medal – second place | 1985 Tweed Heads | fours |
| Silver medal – second place | 1989 Suva | pairs |
| Silver medal – second place | 1989 Suva | fours |
| Silver medal – second place | 1991 Kowloon | pairs |
| Bronze medal – third place | 1991 Kowloon | fours |
| Bronze medal – third place | 1993 Victoria | pairs |
| Bronze medal – third place | 1995 Dunedin | pairs |
| Bronze medal – third place | 1995 Dunedin | singles |
Representing Hong Kong
| Bronze medal – third place | 1997 Warilla | singles |
| Bronze medal – third place | 1997 Warilla | pairs |
| Gold medal – first place | 2001 Melbourne | singles |
| Bronze medal – third place | 2001 Melbourne | pairs |
| Bronze medal – third place | 2003 Brisbane | singles |
| Bronze medal – third place | 2003 Brisbane | pairs |

Noel Joseph Kennedy (born 1964) is a British born, former Hong Kong international lawn bowler.

== Bowls career ==
Kennedy has represented Hong Kong at three Commonwealth Games; in the fours at the 1986 Commonwealth Games, in the pairs and in the fours at the 1990 Commonwealth Games and the 1994 Commonwealth Games.

He won 14 medals at the Asia Pacific Bowls Championships, including a gold medal in the 2001 singles at Melbourne.

He has won the 1994 singles title and the 1988 & 2007 pairs at the Hong Kong International Bowls Classic.
