= Jimmy Hobday =

British lawn bowler (born 1951)

Personal information
- Nationality: British (English)
- Born: 1951 (age 74–75)

Sport
- Sport: Lawn bowls
- Club: Boscombe Cliff BC
Medal record
Representing England
World Outdoor Championships
Gold medal – first place	1980 Frankston	triples
Gold medal – first place	1980 Frankston	team

Jimmy Hobday (born 1951) is a former English international lawn and indoor bowler.

== Bowls career ==
=== World Championships ===
Hobday won two gold medals in the triples at the 1980 World Outdoor Bowls Championship in Melbourne with Tony Allcock and David Bryant and the team event (Leonard Cup).

=== Commonwealth Games ===
He represented England at the 1982 Commonwealth Games in the fours, at the 1982 Commonwealth Games in Brisbane, Queensland, Australia.

=== National ===
Hobday was an international from 1977 until 1984 and won the 1976 Junior Singles Championship at the National Championships.

He bowled for both Wiltshire and Hampshire, the latter for the Boscombe Cliff BC.
