= Camilla Leung =

Hong Kong lawn bowler

Personal information
- Nationality: Hongkonger
Medal record
Representing (Hong Kong)
Asia Pacific Bowls Championships
Gold medal – first place	2005 Melbourne	triples
Bronze medal – third place	2007 Christchurch	fours

Camilla Leung is a Hong Kong international lawn bowler.

== Bowls career ==
Leung was selected as part of the five woman team by Hong Kong for the 2012 World Outdoor Bowls Championship, which was held in Adelaide, Australia.

She won a triples gold medal (with Grace Chu and Elizabeth Li), at the 2005 Asia Pacific Bowls Championships, held in Melbourne. Two years later she won a fours bronze at the 2007 event.
