= Roberto da Silva =

Hong Kong international lawn bowler

Personal information
- Nationality: Hong Kong
- Born: 1931 (age 94–95)
Medal record
Representing Hong Kong
World Outdoor Championships
Bronze medal – third place	1972 Worthing	fours
Commonwealth Games
Gold medal – first place	1970 Edinburgh	fours
Gold medal – first place	1978 Edmonton	fours

Roberto Eduardo da Silva is a former Hong Kong international lawn bowler.

== Bowls career ==
He was born in 1932 to Portuguese parents and won a bronze medal in the fours with Saco Delgado and Abdul Kitchell at the 1972 World Outdoor Bowls Championship in Worthing.

Either side of the World Championship he won two Commonwealth Games gold medals. In 1970 he was part of the four that won the gold medal at the 1970 British Commonwealth Games in Edinburgh and eight years later repeated the success at the 1978 Commonwealth Games in Edmonton.

== Personal life ==
He was a banking official by trade.
