= M. B. Hassan Jr. =

M B Hassan Jr.
Personal information
- Nationality: Hongkonger
- Born: 1949 (age 76–77)

Sport
- Club: Indian Recreation Club.
Medal record
Representing Hong Kong
Commonwealth Games
Gold medal – first place	1978 Edmonton	fours
Asia Pacific Bowls Championships
Gold medal – first place	1985 Tweed Heads	triples
Silver medal – second place	1985 Tweed Heads	fours

Mohammed Majid bin Hassan Junior (born 1949) is a former Hong Kong international lawn and indoor bowler.

== Bowls career ==
Hassan started playing aged 13 and has played for both Somerset and Essex in addition to the Indian Recreation Club in So Kon Po Valley.

He won a gold medal in the fours at the 1978 Commonwealth Games in Edmonton.

He won two medals at the Asia Pacific Bowls Championships including a gold medal in the 1985 triples at Tweed Heads, New South Wales.
