= Abdul Kitchell =

Hong Kong international lawn bowler

Personal information
- Nationality: Hong Kong
- Born: 1916

Sport
- Club: Indian Recreation BC
Medal record
Representing Hong Kong
World Outdoor Championships
Bronze medal – third place	1972 Worthing	fours
Commonwealth Games
Gold medal – first place	1970 Edinburgh	fours

Abdul Raheem Kitchell (born 1916) is a Hong Kong international lawn bowler.

== Bowls career ==
Kitchell was born in 1916 in Hong Kong after his family emigrated from Malaysia in the 1890s. He competed in the first World Bowls Championship in Kyeemagh, New South Wales, Australia in 1966. Six years later he won a bronze medal in the 1972 World Outdoor Bowls Championship.

In between he won a gold medal at the 1970 Commonwealth Games in Edinburgh.

== Personal life ==
Kitchell was an oil company executive by trade.
