= Clementi Cecil Delgado =

Hong Kong and United States international lawn and indoor bowler

Saco Delgado
Personal information
- Nationality: Hong Kong & (United States) USA
- Born: 22 November 1930 Hong Kong
- Died: 16 August 1997 (aged 66) Santa Clara, California
Medal record
Representing Hong Kong
Commonwealth Games
Gold medal – first place	1970 Edinburgh	men's rinks/fours
Gold medal – first place	1978 Edmonton	men's pairs
World Outdoor Championships
Gold medal – first place	1972 Worthing	men's pairs
Bronze medal – third place	1972 Worthing	men's fours

Clementi Cecil Delgado better known as Saco Delgado (1930-1997), was a Hong Kong international lawn and indoor bowler.

== Bowls career ==
Delgado was born in Hong Kong in 1930 to Portuguese parents and was an accountant before he started bowling in 1958. He won the Hong Kong lawn bowls championship ten times before winning the rinks/fours gold medal at the 1970 British Commonwealth Games in Edinburgh.

He won the gold medal in the pairs with Eric Liddell at the 1972 World Outdoor Bowls Championship in Worthing in addition to a bronze medal in the fours event. In 1978 he won another gold medal in the men's pairs with Liddell at the 1978 Commonwealth Games.

== Personal life ==
He was a banking official by trade. He became a US citizen in 1984.
