= George Souza Jr. =

Hong Kong former international lawn and indoor bowler

Personal information
- Nationality: Hongkonger
- Born: 19 August 1942 (age 83)

Sport
- Club: Craigengower CC
Medal record
Representing Hong Kong
World Outdoor Championships
Gold medal – first place	1980 Melbourne	men's fours
Asia Pacific Bowls Championships
Gold medal – first place	1985 Tweed Heads	triples
Silver medal – second place	1985 Tweed Heads	fours
Gold medal – first place	1991 Kowloon	triples
Bronze medal – third place	1991 Kowloon	fours

George Souza Jr. (born 19 August 1942) is a Hong Kong former international lawn and indoor bowler.

== Bowls career ==
Born in 1942 in Shanghai, he first represented Hong Kong in the singles at the 1978 Commonwealth Games. He won a gold medal in the fours at the 1980 World Outdoor Bowls Championship in Melbourne.

Souza won four medals at the Asia Pacific Bowls Championships including two gold medals in the 1985 triples at Tweed Heads, New South Wales and the 1991 triples at Kowloon.

In 1984, he won the Hong Kong International Bowls Classic singles title, in addition to winning three pairs titles in 1983, 1984 and 1994.

== Personal life ==
Souza is the son of George Souza Sr.
