= 2008 World Outdoor Bowls Championship – Women's triples =

Bowls championship held in Christchurch, New Zealand

World Outdoor Bowls Championships 2008 women's triples
- 11th World Outdoor Bowls Championships
- Location: Christchurch, New Zealand
- Date: 12–24 January 2008.
- Category: World Bowls Championship

The 2008 World Outdoor Bowls Championship women's triples was held at the Burnside Bowling Club in Christchurch, New Zealand, from 12 to 24 January 2008.

Sylvia Burns, Loraine Victor and Lorna Trigwell won the women's triples gold medal.

== Section tables ==
=== Section A ===
Pos	Player	P	W	D	L	F	A	Pts	Shots
1	(New Zealand) Marina Khan, Jan Khan, & Sharon Sims	11	10	0	1	247	141	20	+106
2	(Wales) Hannah Smith, Anwen Butten & Kathy Pearce	11	8	1	2	230	154	17	+76
3	(South Africa) Sylvia Burns, Loraine Victor & Lorna Trigwell	11	8	0	3	209	156	16	+53
4	(Hong Kong) Winnie Wai, Camilla Leung & Elizabeth Li	11	7	0	4	230	157	14	+73
5	(England) Lynne Whitehead, Jean Baker & Amy Monkhouse	11	6	1	4	201	165	13	+36
6	(Israel) Beverly Polatinsky, Yael Barner & Tami Kamzel	11	5	1	5	202	205	11	-3
7	(Republic of Ireland) Alison Bell, Donna McNally & Jennifer Dowds	11	4	1	6	166	190	9	-24
8	(Namibia) Sheena du Toit, Marietjie du Preez & Lesley Vermeulen	11	4	0	7	171	218	8	-47
9	(Norfolk Island) Christine Hore, Wendy Nagy & Margaret O'Brien	11	4	0	7	167	218	8	-51
10	(Botswana) Gase Pabalelo, Tirelo Buckley & Lebo Macarenhas	11	3	1	7	186	205	7	-19
11	(Argentina) Carolina Moris, Maria Ines Canzania & Susana Catarini	11	3	0	8	133	284	6	-151
12	(Brunei) Ahmad Norzainah, Muntol Azizah & Amalia Matali	11	1	1	9	173	222	3	-49

=== Section B ===
Pos	Player	P	W	D	L	F	A	Pts	Shots
1	(Australia) Claire Duke, Julie Keegan & Kelsey Cottrell	11	8	1	2	244	135	17	+109
2	(Malaysia) Nor Shafeeqah Yahya, Nur Fidrah Noh & Azlina Arshad	11	8	0	3	205	134	16	+71
3	(Jersey) Christine Grimes, Liz Cole & Karina Bisson	11	7	2	2	212	157	16	+55
4	(Scotland) Joyce Dickey, Seona Black & Lynn Stein	11	7	1	3	225	142	15	+83
5	(Philippines) Sonia Bruce, Nancy Bercasio & Milagros Witheridge	11	7	1	3	221	177	15	+44
6	(Spain) Debbie Colquhoun, Sheri Fletcher & Angie Goodfellow	11	7	0	4	172	178	14	-6
7	(Canada) Shirley Ko, Kerry O'Reilly & Marlene Cleutinx	11	4	1	6	198	199	9	-1
8	(Fiji) Caroline Soro, Varisila Vosalotaki & Salanieta Gukivuli	11	4	0	7	168	209	8	-41
9	(Eswatini) Charlotte Perry, Geraldine Thomas & Donna Svenningsen	11	3	0	8	162	219	6	-58
10	(Zambia) Elizabeth Kamuchoma, Hilda Luipa & Joan Mutale	11	2	2	7	160	229	6	-69
11	(Samoa) Lena Adam, Tina Silva & Feao Wright	11	3	0	8	140	273	6	-133
12	(Cook Islands) Irene Tuouna, Mouauri Tokorangi & Mata Vaile	11	2	0	9	158	212	4	-54

== Finals ==
Play Offs
South Africa	18
Malaysia	17
New Zealand	22
Scotland	21
Australia	27
Hong Kong	4
Wales	22
Jersey	12

Semifinals
South Africa	22
New Zealand	19
Australia	19
Wales	17

Gold medal
South Africa	15
Australia	11

== Results ==
Women's triples section 1
Round 1 - Jan 20		
South Africa	Brunei	20-13
New Zealand	Hong Kong	21-14
Botswana	Wales	17-12
Argentina	Namibia	20-13
Norfolk Island	England	23-16
Israel	Ireland	14-14
Round 2 - Jan 20		
South Africa	New Zealand	20-19
England	Ireland	23-14
Wales	Argentina	24-9
Namibia	Botswana	25-17
Israel	Norfolk Island	20-18
Hong Kong	Brunei	21-12
Round 3 - Jan 20		
South Africa	Israel	38-20
New Zealand	Norfolk Island	19-11
England	Argentina	29-12
Wales	Ireland	16-13
Brunei	Botswana	19-19
Hong Kong	Namibia	21-10
Round 4 - Jan 21		
South Africa	Botswana	19-11
New Zealand	England	17-8
Wales	Hong Kong	22-18
Namibia	Ireland	22-10
Israel	Brunei	26-13
Argentina	Norfolk Island	15-14
Round 5 - Jan 21		
New Zealand	Argentina	51-6
England	Hong Kong	16-13
Wales	South Africa	13-12
Israel	Botswana	18-13
Brunei	Ireland	29-15
Norfolk Island	Namibia	21-15
Round 6 - Jan 22		
South Africa	Argentina	20-11
New Zealand	Brunei	19-14
Wales	Namibia	32-13
Ireland	Hong Kong	17-15
Israel	England	21-11
Norfolk Island	Botswana	24-20
Round 7 - Jan 22		
New Zealand	Israel	21-9
Botswana	Argentina	24-12
England	Wales	16-16
Ireland	Norfolk Island	16-13
Namibia	Brunei	20-16
Hong Kong	South Africa	16-13
Round 8 - Jan 23		
South Africa	Norfolk Island	18-16
New Zealand	Wales	22-13
England	Brunei	26-11
Ireland	Argentina	21-10
Namibia	Israel	19-17
Hong Kong	Botswana	18-17
Round 9 - Jan 23		
New Zealand	Namibia	24-14
England	South Africa	16-11
Wales	Israel	19-14
Ireland	Botswana	22-12
Hong Kong	Argentina	44-8
Norfolk Island	Brunei	16-15
Round 10 - Jan 24		
South Africa	Namibia	18-12
New Zealand	Ireland	16-15
Botswana	England	19-18
Wales	Norfolk Island	42-5
Argentina	Brunei	19-16
Hong Kong	Israel	28-15
Round 11 - Jan 24		
South Africa	Ireland	20-9
New Zealand	Botswana	18-17
England	Namibia	22-8
Wales	Brunei	21-15
Israel	Argentina	28-11
Hong Kong	Norfolk Island	22-6

Women's triples section 2
Round 1 - Jan 20		
Australia	Zambia	22-12
Jersey	Samoa	25-11
Scotland	Fiji	26-14
Eswatini	Canada	19-10
Spain	Cook Islands	23-9
Philippines	Malaysia	20-12
Round 2 - Jan 20		
Australia	Eswatini	24-9
Canada	Zambia	21-21
Jersey	Cook Islands	16-15
Malaysia	Fiji	21-11
Scotland	Philippines	25-18
Samoa	Spain	26-11
Round 3 - Jan 20		
Australia	Fiji	30-7
Canada	Cook Islands	24-21
Malaysia	Eswatini	27-6
Scotland	Samoa	26-12
Spain	Philippines	17-15
Zambia	Jersey	23-23
Round 4 - Jan 21		
Australia	Scotland	15-15
Jersey	Eswatini	22-6
Malaysia	Zambia	18-10
Spain	Canada	24-13
Philippines	Cook Islands	29-11
Samoa	Fiji	18-10
Round 5 - Jan 21		
Australia	Samoa	32-6
Canada	Philippines	23-15
Jersey	Fiji	20-15
Malaysia	Cook Islands	13-12
Scotland	Zambia	31-4
Spain	Eswatini	20-13
Round 6 - Jan 22		
Australia	Spain	35-6
Malaysia	Jersey	19-12
Scotland	Canada	18-12
Eswatini	Zambia	17-16
Philippines	Fiji	19-18
Samoa	Cook Islands	18-16
Round 7 - Jan 22		
Australia	Canada	18-13
Malaysia	Scotland	14-13
Spain	Jersey	16-11
Cook Islands	Zambia	17-15
Fiji	Eswatini	19-13
Philippines	Samoa	23-17
Round 8 - Jan 23		
Australia	Malaysia	18-9
Jersey	Canada	22-14
Eswatini	Samoa	34-7
Spain	Scotland	12-11
Fiji	Cook Islands	17-14
Philippines	Zambia	25-7
Round 9 - Jan 23		
Jersey	Australia	26-15
Malaysia	Canada	21-14
Scotland	Cook Islands	23-8
Zambia	Samoa	25-16
Fiji	Spain	17-15
Philippines	Eswatini	27-18
Round 10 - Jan 24		
Australia	Cook Islands	20-16
Canada	Fiji	23-17
Jersey	Philippines	14-14
Malaysia	Samoa	40-6
Scotland	Eswatini	28-12
Zambia	Spain	17-16
Round 11 - Jan 24		
Canada	Samoa	31-3
Jersey	Scotland	21-9
Spain	Malaysia	12-11
Cook Islands	Eswatini	19-14
Fiji	Zambia	23-10
Philippines	Australia	16-15
