= 2008 World Outdoor Bowls Championship – Women's pairs =

Bowls championship held in Christchurch, New Zealand

World Outdoor Bowls Championships 2008 – women's pairs
- 11th World Outdoor Bowls Championships
- Location: Christchurch, New Zealand
- Date: 12–24 January 2008.
- Category: World Bowls Championship

The 2008 World Outdoor Bowls Championship women's pairs was held at the Burnside Bowling Club in Christchurch, New Zealand, from 12 to 24 January 2008.

Jo Edwards and Val Smith won the women's pairs gold medal.

== Section tables ==
=== Section A ===
Pos	Player	P	W	D	L	F	A	Pts	Shots
1	(Australia) Lynsey Armitage & Karen Murphy	11	11	0	0	233	103	22	+130
2	(New Zealand) Jo Edwards & Val Smith	11	9	0	2	230	134	18	+96
3	(England) Wendy King & Ellen Falkner	11	9	0	2	230	135	18	+95
4	(Republic of Ireland) Bernie O’Neill & Margaret Johnston	11	8	0	3	232	148	16	+84
5	(Zambia) Margaret Mponda & Eddah Mpezeni	11	6	0	5	180	202	12	-22
6	(Brunei) Muntol Isah & Daud Suhana	11	5	0	6	185	213	12	-28
7	(Eswatini) Celma Nienaber & Karin Byars	11	5	0	6	168	213	12	-45
8	(Fiji) Agnes Stephens & Litia Tikoisuva	11	4	0	7	173	200	8	-27
9	(Spain) Carol Meare & Pam Cole	11	3	0	8	155	218	6	-63
10	(Jersey) Gaynor Thomas & Suzie Dingle	11	2	0	9	155	218	4	-63
11	(Samoa) Manuia Porter & Lufilufi Taulealo	11	2	0	9	169	237	4	-68
12	(Argentina) Maria de Cabrera & Alicia Goodliffe	11	2	0	9	141	230	4	-89

=== Section B ===
Pos	Player	P	W	D	L	F	A	Pts	Shots
1	(Scotland) Kay Moran & Margaret Letham	11	11	0	0	261	140	22	+121
2	(Malaysia) Siti Zalina Ahmad & Nor Hashimah Ismail	11	8	2	1	229	149	18	+80
3	(Philippines) Rosita Bradborn & Ronalyn Greenlees	11	8	1	2	213	145	17	+68
4	(Canada) Kelly McKerihen & Leanne Chinery	11	7	0	4	195	186	14	+9
5	(South Africa) Colleen Webb & Cheryl Cox	11	6	0	5	178	184	12	-6
6	(Wales) Wendy Price & Isabel Jones	11	5	0	6	191	166	10	+25
7	(Norfolk Island) Anne Pledger & Debbie Wilford	11	3	2	6	180	190	8	-10
8	(Hong Kong) Peggy Ma & Grace Chu	11	4	0	7	190	214	8	-24
9	(Namibia) Theuna Grobler & Beatrix Lamprecht	11	4	0	7	170	213	8	-43
10	(Israel) Irit Grenchel & Yaffa Lavin	11	3	1	7	172	205	7	-33
11	(Cook Islands) Martina Akaruru & Porea Elisa	11	3	0	8	179	191	6	-12
12	(Botswana) Tshenolo Maloisane & Ivy Morton	11	1	0	10	118	293	2	-175

== Finals ==
Play Offs
New Zealand	30
Philippines	12
(Republic of Ireland) Ireland	20
Scotland	8
England	15
Malaysia	10
Australia	16
Canada	12

Semifinals
New Zealand	18
(Republic of Ireland) Ireland	12
England	17
Australia	16

Gold medal
New Zealand	28
England	8

== Results ==
Women's pairs section 1
Round 1 - Jan 20		
New Zealand	Eswatini	27-10
Australia	Fiji	27-6
England	Brunei	21-11
Zambia	Jersey	16-15
Ireland	Argentina	32-2
Spain	Samoa	18-13
Round 2 - Jan 20		
New Zealand	Argentina	25-4
Australia	Jersey	20-5
England	Fiji	19-12
Zambia	Samoa	28-13
Ireland	Brunei	21-18
Eswatini	Spain	22-11
Round 3 - Jan 20		
New Zealand	Samoa	24-13
Australia	Brunei	23-13
England	Argentina	18-11
Zambia	Fiji	21-18
Ireland	Eswatini	33-8
Spain	Jersey	21-19
Round 4 - Jan 21		
New Zealand	Brunei	23-13
Australia	Samoa	26-9
England	Jersey	19-17
Ireland	Fiji	17-9
Eswatini	Zambia	29-6
Spain	Argentina	26-10
Round 5 - Jan 21		
New Zealand	Spain	27-16
Australia	Zambia	25-14
England	Ireland	28-11
Eswatini	Argentina	21-15
Samoa	Jersey	27-12
Fiji	Brunei	24-12
Round 6 - Jan 22		
New Zealand	England	17-16
Australia	Spain	20-9
Zambia	Ireland	18-9
Argentina	Samoa	20-15
Fiji	Eswatini	21-12
Brunei	Jersey	17-15
Round 7 - Jan 22		
Australia	New Zealand	14-10
England	Zambia	29-9
Ireland	Spain	20-14
Eswatini	Brunei	17-8
Argentina	Jersey	20-15
Samoa	Fiji	24-10
Round 8 - Jan 23		
New Zealand	Fiji	22-15
Australia	Eswatini	24-9
England	Samoa	22-13
Zambia	Argentina	19-17
Ireland	Jersey	25-11
Brunei	Spain	26-17
Round 9 - Jan 23		
New Zealand	Zambia	20-7
Australia	Ireland	19-11
England	Spain	14-8
Jersey	Eswatini	17-14
Fiji	Argentina	19-18
Brunei	Samoa	21-19
Round 10 - Jan 24		
Australia	England	20-7
Zambia	Spain	24-7
Jersey	Fiji	20-16
Ireland	New Zealand	17-12
Eswatini	Samoa	20-14
Brunei	Argentina	25-15
Round 11 - Jan 24		
New Zealand	Jersey	23-9
Australia	Argentina	15-9
England	Eswatini	37-6
Ireland	Samoa	36-9
Fiji	Spain	23-8
Brunei	Zambia	20-18

Women's pairs section 2
Round 1 - Jan 20		
Philippines	Wales	23-12
Canada	Israel	18-17
Scotland	South Africa	18-9
Malaysia	Botswana	32-5
Norfolk Island	Namibia	18-15
Cook Islands	Hong Kong	21-9
Round 2 - Jan 20		
Scotland	Namibia	22-13
South Africa	Wales	15-14
Malaysia	Cook Islands	28-14
Israel	Hong Kong	26-18
Norfolk Island	Canada	18-9
Philippines	Botswana	19-11
Round 3 - Jan 20		
Canada	Cook Islands	24-9
Scotland	Philippines	20-14
South Africa	Norfolk Island	29-12
Malaysia	Wales	16-14
Namibia	Israel	17-16
Hong Kong	Botswana	33-11
Round 4 - Jan 21		
Wales	Namibia	22-15
Scotland	Canada	31-16
South Africa	Botswana	28-11
Malaysia	Israel	24-15
Philippines	Cook Islands	14-11
Hong Kong	Norfolk Island	19-18
Round 5 - Jan 21		
Canada	Namibia	18-15
Scotland	Norfolk Island	24-17
Botswana	Wales	18-12
Malaysia	Hong Kong	24-15
Israel	Cook Islands	16-10
Philippines	South Africa	26-10
Round 6 - Jan 22		
Wales	Israel	25-10
Canada	South Africa	26-11
Scotland	Botswana	28-8
Malaysia	Namibia	18-16
Philippines	Hong Kong	25-2
Cook Islands	Norfolk Island	20-12
Round 7 - Jan 22		
Wales	Cook Islands	19-13
Canada	Philippines	19-15
Scotland	Israel	27-9
Malaysia	South Africa	20-8
Norfolk Island	Botswana	28-4
Hong Kong	Namibia	28-14
Round 8 - Jan 23		
Canada	Wales	14-12
Scotland	Hong Kong	20-13
South Africa	Cook Islands	17-16
Namibia	Botswana	20-16
Philippines	Israel	17-16
Norfolk Island	Malaysia	13-13
Round 9 - Jan 23		
Wales	Norfolk Island	23-11
Scotland	Cook Islands	30-7
South Africa	Hong Kong	18-17
Malaysia	Canada	18-12
Israel	Botswana	24-16
Philippines	Namibia	25-10
Round 10 - Jan 24		
Scotland	Wales	20-14
Malaysia	Philippines	16-16
Namibia	South Africa	16-15
Norfolk Island	Israel	15-15
Hong Kong	Canada	25-13
Cook Islands	Botswana	43-3
Round 11 - Jan 24		
Wales	Hong Kong	24-11
Canada	Botswana	26-15
Scotland	Malaysia	21-20
South Africa	Israel	18-8
Namibia	Cook Islands	19-15
Philippines	Norfolk Island	19-18
