= Lawn bowls at the 2010 Commonwealth Games – Women's pairs =

The women's pairs competition in Lawn Bowls at the 2010 Commonwealth Games began on 4 October 2010 and finished on 11 October 2010. Ellen Falkner and Amy Monkhouse of England won the gold medal, defeating Malaysia's Nor Hashimah Ismail and Zuraini Khalid in the final. Anwen Butten and Hannah Smith from Wales won the bronze medal.

== Results ==
=== Qualifying – round robin ===
==== Section A ====
Team	Players	P	W	L	F	A	Pts	Sets
Australia	Lynsey Armitage & Natasha Van Eldik	10	7	3	195	110	14	+9
New Zealand	Jan Khan & Manu Timoti	10	6	4	202	135	12	+9
Namibia	Theuna Grobler & Diana Viljoen	10	6	4	178	158	12	+6
India	Manu Pal & Arzoo Rani	10	6	4	165	149	12	+2
Zambia	Foster Banda & Chiko Like	10	6	4	170	169	12	+2
South Africa	Brunhilde Rossouw & Colleen Webb	10	6	4	166	150	12	–1
Canada	Amanda Berg & Shirley Wong	10	5	5	138	179	10	–5
Northern Ireland	Jennifer Dowds & Donna McCloy	10	4	6	130	192	8	–8
Cook Islands	Tungane Tere & Tangata Tokorangi	10	3	7	149	176	6	–2
Norfolk Island	Petal Hore & Essie Sanchez	10	3	7	159	169	6	–4
Botswana	Tirelo Buckley & Obopile Mosimanyana	10	3	7	140	205	6	–8

==== Section B ====
Team	Players	P	W	L	F	A	Pts	Sets
Malaysia	Nor Hashimah Ismail & Zuraini Khalid	10	10	0	241	95	20	+18
England	Ellen Falkner & Amy Monkhouse	10	8	2	189	113	26	+12
Wales	Anwen Butten & Hannah Smith	10	8	2	163	155	16	+7
Scotland	Caroline Brown & Margaret Letham	10	7	3	185	132	14	+10
Brunei	Esmawandy Ibrahim & Siti Umar	10	5	5	145	168	10	–2
Samoa	Lena Adams & Akenese Westerlund	10	4	6	141	178	8	0
Jersey	Karina Bisson & Christine Grimes	10	4	6	147	152	8	–4
Guernsey	Lucy Beere & Gwen de la Mare	10	3	7	147	169	6	–8
Swaziland	Karin Byars & Celma Nienaber	10	3	7	129	174	6	–8
Niue	Olivia Bloomfield & Josphine Peyroux	10	2	8	108	217	4	–12
Papua New Guinea	Cunera Monalua & Walo Pisak	10	1	9	139	181	2	–13

=== Knockout stages ===
Quarterfinals
A1	Australia
Bye
B2	England	4	8	2
A3	Namibia	9	7	1
B1	Malaysia
Bye
B3	Wales	12	12
A2	New Zealand	4	2

Semifinals
A1	Australia	10	7
B2	England	10	8
B1	Malaysia	11	9
B3	Wales	4	3

Gold Medal Match
B2	England	12	5	5
B1	Malaysia	6	7	2
Bronze Medal Match
A1	Australia	4	8	1
B3	Wales	7	3	4

== See also ==
- Lawn bowls at the 2010 Commonwealth Games
