= 2008 World Outdoor Bowls Championship – Women's singles =

Bowls championship held in Christchurch, New Zealand

World Outdoor Bowls Championships 2008 women's singles
- 11th World Outdoor Bowls Championships
- Location: Christchurch, New Zealand
- Date: 12–24 January 2008.
- Category: World Bowls Championship

The 2008 World Outdoor Bowls Championship women's singles was held at the Burnside Bowling Club in Christchurch, New Zealand, from 12 to 24 January 2008.

Val Smith won the women's singles gold medal.

== Section tables ==
=== Section A ===
| Pos | Player | P | W | L | F | A | Pts | Shots |
|---|---|---|---|---|---|---|---|---|
| 1 | (Australia) Kelsey Cottrell | 11 | 9 | 2 | 228 | 135 | 18 | +93 |
| 2 | (Malaysia) Siti Zalina Ahmad | 11 | 8 | 3 | 220 | 143 | 16 | +77 |
| 3 | (Canada) Leanne Chinery | 11 | 8 | 3 | 221 | 151 | 16 | +70 |
| 4 | (Scotland) Kay Moran | 11 | 8 | 3 | 216 | 176 | 16 | +40 |
| 5 | (Philippines) Milagros Witheridge | 11 | 7 | 4 | 203 | 170 | 14 | +30 |
| 6 | (Norfolk Island) Debbie Wilford | 11 | 7 | 4 | 199 | 178 | 14 | +21 |
| 7 | (Republic of Ireland) Margaret Johnston | 11 | 7 | 4 | 192 | 173 | 14 | +19 |
| 8 | (Israel) Irit Grenchel | 11 | 4 | 7 | 154 | 194 | 8 | -40 |
| 9 | (Namibia) Lesley Vermuelen | 11 | 3 | 8 | 171 | 215 | 6 | -44 |
| 10 | (Samoa) Feao Wright | 11 | 3 | 8 | 154 | 215 | 6 | -61 |
| 11 | (Argentina) Alicia Goddliffe | 11 | 2 | 9 | 133 | 209 | 4 | -76 |
| 12 | (Zambia) Joan Mutale | 11 | 0 | 11 | 99 | 231 | 0 | -132 |

=== Section B ===
| Pos | Player | P | W | L | F | A | Pts | Shots |
|---|---|---|---|---|---|---|---|---|
| 1 | (New Zealand) Val Smith | 11 | 10 | 1 | 225 | 137 | 20 | +88 |
| 2 | (England) Ellen Falkner | 11 | 9 | 2 | 212 | 132 | 18 | +80 |
| 3 | (Fiji) Litia Tikoisuva | 11 | 7 | 4 | 212 | 184 | 14 | +28 |
| 4 | (Botswana) Lebo Mascarenhas | 11 | 6 | 5 | 211 | 186 | 12 | +25 |
| 5 | (South Africa) Colleen Webb | 11 | 6 | 5 | 164 | 196 | 12 | -32 |
| 6 | (Wales) Kathy Pearce | 11 | 5 | 6 | 194 | 183 | 10 | +11 |
| 7 | (Jersey) Karina Bisson | 11 | 5 | 6 | 204 | 202 | 10 | +2 |
| 8 | (Cook Islands) Porea Elisa | 11 | 5 | 6 | 163 | 198 | 10 | -35 |
| 9 | (Hong Kong) Peggy Ma | 11 | 4 | 7 | 172 | 202 | 8 | -30 |
| 10 | (Eswatini) Karin Byars | 11 | 4 | 7 | 174 | 212 | 8 | -38 |
| 11 | (Brunei) Amalia Matali | 11 | 4 | 7 | 149 | 210 | 8 | -61 |
| 12 | (Spain) Pam Cole | 11 | 1 | 10 | 181 | 219 | 2 | -38 |

== Finals ==
Play Offs
(New Zealand) Smith | 21
(Scotland) Moran | 14
(Malaysia) Ahmad | 21
(Fiji) Tikoisuva | 11
(England) Falkner | 21
(Canada) Chinery | 17
(Australia) Cottrell | 21
(Botswana) Mascarenhas | 1

Semifinals
(New Zealand) Smith | 21
(Malaysia) Ahmad | 10
(England) Falkner | 21
(Australia) Cottrell | 19

Gold medal
(New Zealand) Smith | 21
(England) Falkner | 13

== Results ==
Women's singles section 1
| Round 1 – Jan 12 | | |
| Ireland | Samoa | 21–10 |
| Australia | Zambia | 21–2 |
| Canada | Scotland | 21–20 |
| Malaysia | Norfolk Island | 21–13 |
| Argentina | Namibia | 21–11 |
| Philippines | Israel | 21–14 |
| Round 2 – Jan 12 | | |
| Ireland | Zambia | 21–12 |
| Scotland | Israel | 21–20 |
| Australia | Argentina | 21–17 |
| Malaysia | Samoa | 21–4 |
| Namibia | Canada | 21–17 |
| Norfolk Island | Philippines | 21–15 |
| Round 3 – Jan 13 | | |
| Scotland | Ireland | 21–20 |
| Canada | Samoa | 21–8 |
| Malaysia | Australia | 21–20 |
| Israel | Argentina | 21–18 |
| Norfolk Island | Zambia | 21–4 |
| Philippines | Namibia | 21–7 |
| Round 4 – Jan 13 | | |
| Scotland | Argentina | 21–4 |
| Australia | Samoa | 21–16 |
| Canada | Philippines | 21–15 |
| Malaysia | Israel | 21–1 |
| Namibia | Zambia | 21–15 |
| Norfolk Island | Ireland | 21–10 |
| Round 5 – Jan 13 | | |
| Australia | Namibia | 21–6 |
| Canada | Israel | 21–8 |
| Malaysia | Ireland | 21–11 |
| Argentina | Zambia | 21–9 |
| Philippines | Scotland | 21–18 |
| Samoa | Norfolk Island | 21–19 |
| Round 6 – Jan 14 | | |
| Ireland | Philippines | 21–12 |
| Australia | Scotland | 21–10 |
| Canada | Norfolk Island | 21–10 |
| Malaysia | Namibia | 21–17 |
| Israel | Zambia | 21–1 |
| Samoa | Argentina | 21–15 |
| Round 7 – Jan 14 | | |
| Ireland | Namibia | 21–20 |
| Scotland | Malaysia | 21–19 |
| Australia | Philippines | 21–14 |
| Canada | Zambia | 21–4 |
| Israel | Samoa | 21–15 |
| Norfolk Island | Argentina | 21–19 |
| Round 8 – Jan 15 | | |
| Ireland | Canada | 21–20 |
| Scotland | Samoa | 21–7 |
| Australia | Israel | 21–8 |
| Malaysia | Argentina | 21–7 |
| Norfolk Island | Namibia | 21–19 |
| Philippines | Samoa | 21–16 |
| Round 9 – Jan 15 | | |
| Ireland | Argentina | 21–4 |
| Scotland | Norfolk Island | 21–10 |
| Australia | Canada | 21–16 |
| Malaysia | Zambia | 21–7 |
| Israel | Namibia | 21–13 |
| Philippines | Samoa | 21–16 |
| Round 10 – Jan 16 | | |
| Scotland | Namibia | 21–15 |
| Australia | Ireland | 21–4 |
| Canada | Argentina | 21–3 |
| Norfolk Island | Israel | 21–8 |
| Philippines | Malaysia | 21–13 |
| Samoa | Zambia | 21–13 |
| Round 11 – Jan 16 | | |
| Ireland | Israel | 21–11 |
| Scotland | Zambia | 21–18 |
| Canada | Malaysia | 21–20 |
| Namibia | Samoa | 21–15 |
| Norfolk Island | Australia | 21–19 |
| Philippines | Argentina | 21–4 |

Women's singles section 2
| Round 1 – Jan 12 | | |
| England | South Africa | 21–3 |
| Botswana | Wales | 21–8 |
| New Zealand | Fiji | 21–11 |
| Jersey | Hong Kong | 21–16 |
| Spain | Cook Islands | 21–9 |
| Brunei | Eswatini | 21–14 |
| Round 2 – Jan 12 | | |
| South Africa | Hong Kong | 21–17 |
| England | Eswatini | 21–9 |
| Botswana | Brunei | 21–4 |
| New Zealand | Jersey | 21–20 |
| Cook Islands | Wales | 21–15 |
| Fiji | Spain | 21–14 |
| Round 3 – Jan 13 | | |
| England | Spain | 21–14 |
| Botswana | Fiji | 21–20 |
| New Zealand | Wales | 21–12 |
| Jersey | Eswatini | 21–18 |
| Cook Islands | South Africa | 21–6 |
| Hong Kong | Brunei | 21–13 |
| Round 4 – Jan 13 | | |
| South Africa | Brunei | 21–9 |
| England | Jersey | 21–16 |
| Botswana | Spain | 21–16 |
| New Zealand | Cook Islands | 21–11 |
| Eswatini | Wales | 21–16 |
| Fiji | Hong Kong | 21–13 |
| Round 5 – Jan 13 | | |
| Wales | Brunei | 21–14 |
| England | Hong Kong | 21–9 |
| New Zealand | Spain | 21–13 |
| Jersey | South Africa | 21–4 |
| Eswatini | Botswana | 21–19 |
| Fiji | Cook Islands | 21–8 |
| Round 6 – Jan 14 | | |
| South Africa | Botswana | 21–19 |
| Wales | Hong Kong | 21–10 |
| England | New Zealand | 21–15 |
| Eswatini | Fiji | 21–14 |
| Cook Islands | Jersey | 21–15 |
| Brunei | Spain | 21–18 |
| Round 7 – Jan 14 | | |
| Wales | England | 21–8 |
| Botswana | Jersey | 21–16 |
| New Zealand | Brunei | 21–8 |
| Cook Islands | Eswatini | 21–19 |
| Fiji | South Africa | 21–20 |
| Hong Kong | Spain | 21–18 |
| Round 8 – Jan 15 | | |
| South Africa | Spain | 21–20 |
| Wales | Jersey | 21–12 |
| England | Cook Islands | 21–5 |
| Botswana | Hong Kong | 21–17 |
| New Zealand | Eswatini | 21–13 |
| Fiji | Brunei | 21–11 |
| Round 9 – Jan 15 | | |
| England | Botswana | 21–13 |
| New Zealand | South Africa | 21–5 |
| Jersey | Spain | 21–18 |
| Fiji | Wales | 21–19 |
| Brunei | Cook Islands | 21–11 |
| Hong Kong | Eswatini | 21–10 |
| Round 10 – Jan 16 | | |
| South Africa | Eswatini | 21–7 |
| Wales | Spain | 21–13 |
| England | Brunei | 21–6 |
| New Zealand | Hong Kong | 21–6 |
| Jersey | Fiji | 21–20 |
| Cook Islands | Botswana | 21–17 |
| Round 11 – Jan 16 | | |
| South Africa | Wales | 21–19 |
| New Zealand | Botswana | 21–17 |
| Eswatini | Spain | 21–16 |
| Fiji | England | 21–15 |
| Brunei | Jersey | 21–20 |
| Hong Kong | Cook Islands | 21–14 |
