= Herbertson =

Herbertson is a surname. Notable people with the surname include:

- Andrew John Herbertson (1865–1915), British geographer
- Betty Herbertson, Australian lawn bowler
- Helen Herbertson, Australian choreographer, winner of the Kenneth Myer Medallion for the Performing Arts in 2007
- Herb Herbertson, a character in Nexo Knights
- Robert Herbertson (1852–1940), Australian politician
- Samuel Herbertson (1889–1915), Scottish footballer
