= 2000 World Outdoor Bowls Championship – Women's triples =

World bowls event

World Outdoor Championships 2000 – women's triples
- 9th World Outdoor Bowls Championships
- Location: Moama, Australia
- Date: 8–25 March 2000
- Category: World Outdoor Championships

The 2000 World Outdoor Bowls Championship women's triples was held in Moama, Australia, from 8 to 25 March 2000.

The gold medal was won by Sharon Sims, Anne Lomas and Patsy Jorgensen of New Zealand.

== Section tables ==
=== Section A ===
Pos	Player	P	W	D	L	Pts
1	(New Zealand) Sharon Sims, Anne Lomas, Patsy Jorgensen	16	13	2	1	28
2	(South Africa) Lorna Trigwell, Hester Bekker, Trish Steyn	16	13	0	3	26
3	(Wales) Shirley King, Nina Shipperlee, Betty Morgan	16	12	1	3	25
4	(Scotland) Betty Forsyth, Julie Forrest, Sarah Gourlay	16	12	0	4	24
5	(Israel) Renee Kusman, Pnina Gelbgiser, Ruthie Gilor	16	10	0	6	20 (+62)
6	Malaysia	16	10	0	6	20 (+8)
7	Spain	16	9	0	7	18 (+27)
8	Zimbabwe	16	9	0	7	18 (+17)
9	Namibia	16	7	0	9	14
10	Samoa	16	6	1	9	13
11	Cook Islands	16	6	0	10	12 (-21)
12	Fiji	16	6	0	10	12 (-50)
13	Brazil	16	5	0	11	10
14	Zambia	16	4	1	11	9
15	Papua New Guinea	16	4	0	12	8 (-68)
16	(United States) Dora Stewart, Katy Stone & Maryna Hyland	16	4	0	12	8 (-73)
17	Singapore	16	3	1	12	7

=== Section B ===
Pos	Player	P	W	D	L	Pts
1	(England) Katherine Hawes, Jill Polley, Norma Shaw	16	15	0	1	30
2	(Australia) Willow Fong, Margaret Sumner, Roma Dunn	16	13	0	3	26 (+198)
3	(Jersey) Liz Cole, Suzie Dingle, Karina Horman	16	13	0	3	26 (+155)
4	Donna McNally, Dorothy Kane, Margaret Johnston	16	12	0	4	24
5	India	16	10	1	5	21
6	(Canada) Doreen Creaney, Margaret Richards, Anita Nivala	16	10	0	6	20 (+92)
7	(Eswatini) Swaziland	16	9	2	5	20 (+40)
8	Norfolk Island	16	8	1	7	17
9	(Guernsey) Pauline Leadbetter, Jean Simon, Sheila Cave	16	8	0	8	16 (+51)
10	(Botswana) Debra Stewart, Lebo Moroke, Thembi Drewett	16	8	0	8	16 (-34)
11	(Hong Kong) Angela Chau, Linda Da Luz, Lena Yeung	16	7	0	9	14
12	Kenya	16	5	1	10	11
13	Brunei	16	3	3	10	9
14	Netherlands	16	3	2	11	8
15	Argentina	16	3	0	13	6
16	Thailand	16	2	1	13	5
17	Japan	16	1	1	14	3

== Results ==
Women's triples section A
Round 1 - (8 Mar)		
Zimbabwe	Namibia	21–11
South Africa	Wales	17–16
Fiji	United States	24–16
Singapore	Papua New Guinea	16–11
Malaysia	Cook Islands	18–16
Samoa	Zambia	22–10
Spain	Israel	21–13
New Zealand	Brazil	23–6
Round 2 - (8 Mar)		
Scotland	Malaysia	14–12
Spain	South Africa	22–10
Wales	Samoa	18–10
New Zealand	Singapore	27–7
Namibia	Fiji	26–5
Zambia	Papua New Guinea	19–16
Israel	United States	26–15
Cook Islands	Brazil	24–13
Round 3 - (9 Mar)		
Wales	Fiji	21–19
Scotland	United States	15–14
South Africa	Singapore	24–11
New Zealand	Papua New Guinea	18–14
Cook Islands	Namibia	15–11
Israel	Malaysia	28–5
Brazil	Zambia	24–11
Spain	Zimbabwe	25–9
Round 4 - (9 Mar)		
Wales	Zambia	19–17
Scotland	Israel	29–8
South Africa	Cook Islands	24–17
New Zealand	Namibia	31–7
United States	Brazil	24–8
Fiji	Papua New Guinea	18–15
Samoa	Zimbabwe	24–12
Spain	Singapore	21–12
Round 5 - (9 Mar)		
Scotland	Spain	31–7
Wales	Zimbabwe	23–12
Malaysia	Namibia	33–13
Israel	Singapore	26–9
Fiji	Zambia	26–17
Cook Islands	United States	16–14
New Zealand	Samoa	32–5
South Africa	Brazil	38–9
Round 6 - (10 Mar)		
Wales	Singapore	44–4
Scotland	Fiji	16–14
Malaysia	South Africa	22–7
New Zealand	United States	26–10
Namibia	Papua New Guinea	24–7
Israel	Cook Islands	20–11
Zimbabwe	Zambia	19–14
Brazil	Samoa	20–17
Round 7 - (10 Mar)		
Wales	New Zealand	16–16
Scotland	Brazil	38–10
South Africa	Namibia	33–10
Zimbabwe	Cook Islands	15–13
Papua New Guinea	Spain	26–21
Singapore	Fiji	21–16
Malaysia	Zambia	20–18
United States	Samoa	17–13
Round 8 - (11 Mar)		
Scotland	Zimbabwe	14–11
Wales	Brazil	25–10
New Zealand	Spain	29–11
Samoa	Namibia	21–13
Zambia	Israel	18–13
United States	Papua New Guinea	19–12
Cook Islands	Fiji	22–8
Malaysia	Singapore	25–7
Round 9 - (11 Mar)		
New Zealand	Scotland	18–15
Israel	South Africa	21–9
Wales	Namibia	28–11
Spain	United States	20–17
Fiji	Samoa	22–16
Cook Islands	Singapore	21–9
Brazil	Malaysia	20–19
Zimbabwe	Papua New Guinea	22–7
Round 10 - (12 Mar)		
South Africa	United States	16–10
Wales	Papua New Guinea	16–14
Scotland	Cook Islands	25–12
New Zealand	Zambia	19–19
Israel	Namibia	17–14
Brazil	Singapore	25–10
Samoa	Spain	27–19
Malaysia	Zimbabwe	14–12
Round 11 - (12 Mar)		
New Zealand	Zimbabwe	25–8
Namibia	Scotland	20–12
Wales	Israel	15–11
South Africa	Zambia	30–5
Papua New Guinea	Brazil	23–14
Malaysia	United States	22–11
Samoa	Singapore	13–13
Fiji	Spain	26–8
Round 12 - (13 Mar)		
South Africa	Fiji	27–12
Wales	United States	25–11
Papua New Guinea	Scotland	20–16
New Zealand	Cook Islands	26–10
Zambia	Namibia	22–15
Israel	Samoa	29–16
Malaysia	Spain	21–20
Zimbabwe	Brazil	27–14
Round 13 - (13 Mar)		
South Africa	Samoa	29–11
Wales	Malaysia	23–14
Scotland	Singapore	19–13
Cook Islands	Zambia	23–16
Israel	Papua New Guinea	21–15
Namibia	United States	22–13
Spain	Brazil	35–8
Zimbabwe	Fiji	20–6
Round 14 - (14 Mar)		
South Africa	Scotland	25–12
New Zealand	Fiji	26–14
Namibia	Brazil	19–12
Israel	Zimbabwe	16–10
Samoa	Cook Islands	19–12
Malaysia	Papua New Guinea	24–14
United States	Singapore	20–16
Spain	Zambia	22–10
Round 15 - (14 Mar)		
South Africa	Papua New Guinea	21–11
Wales	Cook Islands	22–13
Namibia	Spain	16–15
New Zealand	Israel	15–10
Scotland	Zambia	21–10
Brazil	Fiji	21–15
Zimbabwe	Singapore	25–8
Malaysia	Samoa	19–14
Round 16 - (15 Mar)		
Scotland	Wales	21–14
		–
		–
		–
		–
		–
		–
		–
Round 17 - (15 Mar)		
Scotland	Samoa	24–15
		–
		–
		–
		–
		–
		–
		–

Women's triples section B
Round 1 - (8 Mar)		
England	Australia	24–14
Canada	Netherlands	26–9
Guernsey	Brunei	22–11
Hong Kong	Kenya	21–12
Jersey	Thailand	35–10
Norfolk Island	Argentina	26–17
Ireland	India	23–14
(Eswatini) Swaziland	Japan	15–13
Round 2 - (8 Mar)		
Norfolk Island	(Eswatini) Swaziland	17–14
Australia	Japan	36–11
England	Kenya	15–14
Guernsey	Netherlands	21–15
Ireland	Brunei	26–16
India	Botswana	23–11
Jersey	Argentina	43–1
Canada	Hong Kong	17–8
Round 3 - (9 Mar)		
England	Argentina	38–6
Jersey	Ireland	16–13
Japan	Thailand	20–13
Hong Kong	Brunei	28–7
India	(Eswatini) Swaziland	19–18
Norfolk Island	Botswana	31–2
Canada	Guernsey	26–18
Australia	Netherlands	39–14
Round 4 - (9 Mar)		
Australia	Ireland	13–11
England	Hong Kong	26–9
Jersey	Guernsey	18–15
Botswana	(Eswatini) Swaziland	25–11
Canada	Argentina	43–5
Thailand	Kenya	16–12
Japan	Netherlands	18–18
Norfolk Island	Brunei	13–13
Round 5 - (9 Mar)		
England	Thailand	40–9
Norfolk Island	Ireland	20–16
Botswana	Japan	29–13
Jersey	India	20–10
Hong Kong	Argentina	21–10
Kenya	Guernsey	23–21
Netherlands	(Eswatini) Swaziland	15–15
Australia	Brunei	28–15
Round 6 - (10 Mar)		
Ireland	(Eswatini) Swaziland	20–15
England	Netherlands	44–10
Kenya	Brunei	17–17
Australia	India	27–8
Jersey	Canada	19–13
Botswana	Argentina	23–6
Hong Kong	Thailand	32–12
Guernsey	Norfolk Island	24–14
Round 7 - (10 Mar)		
England	Guernsey	25–12
Canada	Japan	28–9
Netherlands	Argentina	16–12
Ireland	Thailand	22–18
Norfolk Island	Kenya	26–9
Australia	Jersey	22–19
India	Hong Kong	18–15
Botswana	Brunei	15–14
Round 8 - (11 Mar)		
India	Netherlands	16–12
Jersey	Kenya	29–8
Botswana	Thailand	27–9
England	Brunei	25–7
Ireland	Argentina	31–6
(Eswatini) Swaziland	Hong Kong	17–9
Guernsey	Japan	27–8
Canada	Norfolk Island	26–9
Round 9 - (11 Mar)		
Kenya	Argentina	31–10
Norfolk Island	Japan	32–6
India	Brunei	20–19
Ireland	Netherlands	32–8
(Eswatini) Swaziland	Australia	19–13
Guernsey	Botswana	24–13
England	Jersey	28–6
Canada	Thailand	27–20
Round 10 - (12 Mar)		
Australia	Norfolk Island	16–14
England	Canada	14–13
Guernsey	Hong Kong	18–14
Ireland	Botswana	26–14
(Eswatini) Swaziland	Jersey	17–15
Kenya	Japan	22–19
Thailand	India	15–15
Brunei	Netherlands	23–14
Round 11 - (12 Mar)		
		–
		–
	Ireland	–
	(Eswatini) Swaziland	–
		–
		–
		–
		–
Round 12 - (13 Mar)		
India	Japan	23–12
Brunei	Thailand	19–13
England	Norfolk Island	31–10
Jersey	Hong Kong	19–12
Ireland	Guernsey	16–6
Canada	Botswana	23–12
Australia	Argentina	34–3
(Eswatini) Swaziland	Kenya	21–17
Round 13 - (13 Mar)		
Botswana	Netherlands	17–13
Jersey	Norfolk Island	35–14
Australia	Kenya	42–7
Brunei	Japan	23–11
(Eswatini) Swaziland	Canada	25–13
Hong Kong	Ireland	23–12
Argentina	Thailand	23–13
England	India	37–4
Round 14 - (14 Mar)		
Jersey	Brunei	23–13
Australia	Botswana	27–9
Hong Kong	Japan	18–17
(Eswatini) Swaziland	Thailand	28–7
Guernsey	Argentina	43–8
India	Canada	16–9
Norfolk Island	Netherlands	22–8
Ireland	Kenya	23–15
Round 15 - (14 Mar)		
Ireland	England	21–12
Kenya	India	29–9
Thailand	Netherlands	19–8
Canada	Australia	16–12
Jersey	Japan	27–6
Argentina	Brunei	16–14
Botswana	Hong Kong	17–15
(Eswatini) Swaziland	Guernsey	20–10
Round 16 - (15 Mar)		
Ireland	Japan	22–12
Brunei	(Eswatini) Swaziland	22–22
England	Botswana	21–12
Kenya	Canada	17–12
India	Argentina	16–12
Norfolk Island	Thailand	24–9
Australia	Guernsey	18–10
Netherlands	Hong Kong	19–17
Round 17 - (15 Mar)		
Ireland	Canada	24–7
England	Japan	27–8
(Eswatini) Swaziland	Argentina	25–15
India	Guernsey	17–13
Jersey	Netherlands	29–14
Hong Kong	Norfolk Island	24–10
Botswana	Kenya	19–16
Australia	Thailand	30–7

== Bronze medal match ==
Australia bt South Africa 28–11

== Gold medal match ==
New Zealand bt England 18-12
