= Lawn bowls at the 2010 Commonwealth Games – Women's triples =

Lawn bowls – Women's triples at the 2010 Commonwealth Games
- Venue: Yamuna Sports Complex
- Dates: 4–10 October 2010
- Competitors: 54 from 18 nations

The women's triples lawn bowling competition began on 4 October 2010. and finished on 10 October 2010. South Africa won the gold medal, defeating Australia in the final. England won the bronze medal.

== Results ==
=== Qualifying – round robin ===
==== Section A ====
Team	Players	P	W	L	F	A	Pts	Set Diff
England	Sian Gordon, Sandy Hazell, Jamie-Lea Winch	8	7	1	162	110	14	+10
South Africa	Tracy-Lee Botha, Susan Nel, Santjie Steyn	8	7	1	164	95	14	+7
Malaysia	Azlina Arshad, Zuraini Khalid, Nur Fidrah Noh	8	6	2	159	111	12	+8
Papua New Guinea	Moata Apu, Elizabeth Bure, Geua Vada Tau	8	5	3	124	135	10	0
Wales	Isabel Jones, Kathy Pearce, Wendy Price	8	4	4	140	116	8	+2
Cook Islands	Porea Elisa, Teokotai Jim, Kanny Vaile	8	3	5	126	112	6	–1
Canada	Rachel Larson, Harriette Pituley, Erin Roth	8	3	5	111	137	6	–5
Norfolk Island	Kitha Bailey, Margaret O'Brien, Anne Pledger	8	1	7	84	205	2	–12
Brunei	Haja Ampuan Salleh, Hajah Haji Ibrahim, Hajah Muntol	8	0	8	104	153	0	–9

==== Section B ====
Team	Players	P	W	L	F	A	Pts	Set Diff
India	Tania Choudhury, Rupa Rani Tirkey, Pinki	8	6	2	166	102	12	+9
Australia	Claire Duke, Julie Keegan, Sharyn Renshaw	8	6	2	173	101	12	+8
Scotland	Michelle Cooper, Lorraine Malloy, Lynn Stein	8	6	2	141	104	12	+7
New Zealand	Genevieve Baildon, Karen Coombe, Dale Lang	8	6	2	176	107	12	+5
Northern Ireland	Sandra Bailie, Mandy Cunningham, Barbara Logue	8	4	4	122	134	8	–2
Jersey	Helen Greechan, Susan Noel, Joan Renouf	8	4	4	124	160	8	–6
Namibia	Beatrix Lamprecht, Charlotte Morland, Lesley Vermueleen	8	2	6	136	134	4	–4
Botswana	Tibone Fox, Ivy Morton, Nelly Senna	8	1	7	105	141	2	–5
Niue	Faua Bell, Koumanogi Lepa, Anne Strickland	8	1	7	69	229	2	–12

=== Knockout stages ===
Quarterfinals
A1	England
Bye
A2	South Africa	8	6	3
B3	Scotland	3	7	1
B1	India
Bye
A3	Malaysia	6	6
B2	Australia	7	11

Semifinals
A1	England	6	13	2
A2	South Africa	8	4	3
B1	India	10	3
B2	Australia	12	12

Gold Medal Match
A2	South Africa	9	4	4
B2	Australia	6	8	3
Bronze Medal Match
A1	England	9	7
B1	India	8	7
