= Bill Cornehls =

Australian lawn bowler

William 'Bill' Cornehls
Personal information
- Nationality: Australian
- Born: 29 December 1960 (age 65) Cobram, Victoria
Medal record
Representing Australia
World Outdoor Championships
Silver medal – second place	2008 Christchurch	fours
Silver medal – second place	2008 Christchurch	team
Commonwealth Games
Gold medal – first place	2006 Victoria	triples
Asia Pacific Bowls Championships
Gold medal – first place	2003 Brisbane	fours
Silver medal – second place	2003 Brisbane	triples
Gold medal – first place	2007 Christchurch	triples
Gold medal – first place	2007 Christchurch	fours

William 'Bill' John Cornehls (born 1960) is a former Australian international lawn bowler.

== Bowls career ==
Cornehls won the Australian Singles Championship in 2000.

He won a gold medal in the inaugural triples competition at the 2006 Commonwealth Games in Victoria (Australia) with Mark Casey and Wayne Turley.

Two years later he won the silver medal in the fours with Nathan Rice, Wayne Turley and Mark Casey at the 2008 World Outdoor Bowls Championship in Christchurch. Shortly afterwards he announced his retirement.

He has won three gold medals at the Asia Pacific Bowls Championships.
