= Manu Timoti =

New Zealand lawn bowler

Personal information
- Nationality: New Zealander

Sport
- Sport: Lawn bowls
- Club: Hikurangi BC / Whangarei BC
Medal record
Representing New Zealand
Asia Pacific Bowls Championships
Gold medal – first place	2007 Christchurch	fours
Bronze medal – third place	2007 Christchurch	triples

Manu Timoti also known as Rawi Timoti is a New Zealand international lawn bowler.

== Bowls career ==
Timoti won the gold medal in the fours with Jan Khan, Marina Khan and Mary Campbell and the bronze medal in the triples at the 2007 Asia Pacific Bowls Championships in Adelaide.

She was selected to represent New Zealand at the 2010 Commonwealth Games, where she competed in the pairs event.
