= Tanimetua Harry =

Cook Islander lawn bowler

Personal information
- Nationality: Cook Islander
- Born: 24 January 1950 (age 76)
Medal record
Representing (Cook Islands)
Asia Pacific Bowls Championships
Bronze medal – third place	1995 Dunedin	triples

Tanimetua Harry (born 1950) is a former international lawn bowler from the Cook Islands.

== Bowls career ==
Harry has represented the Cook Islands at two Commonwealth Games; in the fours at the 1990 Commonwealth Games and in the singles at the 1998 Commonwealth Games.

She won a triples bronze medal (with Porea Elisa and Tremoana Damm) at the 1995 Asia Pacific Bowls Championships.
