= Tremoana Damm =

Cook Islander lawn bowler

Personal information
- Nationality: Cook Islander
- Born: 20 July 1945 (age 80)
Medal record
Representing (Cook Islands)
Asia Pacific Bowls Championships
Bronze medal – third place	1995 Dunedin	triples

Tremoana Damm (born 1945) is a former international lawn bowler from the Cook Islands.

== Bowls career ==
Damm has represented the Cook Islands at three Commonwealth Games; in the fours at the 1994 Commonwealth Games, in the fours at the 1998 Commonwealth Games and in the singles at the 2002 Commonwealth Games.

She won a triples bronze medal (with Porea Elisa and Tanimetua Harry) at the 1995 Asia Pacific Bowls Championships.
