= Genevieve Baildon =

New Zealand lawn bowler (born 1985)

Personal information
- Nationality: New Zealander
- Born: 1985 Mount Albert, New Zealand

Sport
- Sport: Lawn bowls
- Club: Hillcrest BC
Medal record
Representing New Zealand
Asia Pacific Bowls Championships
Gold medal – first place	2011 Adelaide	fours
Bronze medal – third place	2011 Adelaide	triples

Genevieve Baildon (born 1985) is a New Zealand international lawn bowler.

== Bowls career ==
In 2009, she won the Hong Kong International Bowls Classic singles.

She was selected to represent New Zealand at the 2010 Commonwealth Games, where she competed in the triples events.

Baildon won the gold medal in the fours with Jo Edwards, Leanne Curry and Jan Khan and the bronze medal in the triples at the 2011 Asia Pacific Bowls Championships in Adelaide.
