= Olssen =

Olssen is a surname. Notable people with the name include:

- Betty Olssen, Fijian international lawn bowler
- Erik Olssen ONZM FRSNZ (born 1941), New Zealand historian
- Gyda Ellefsplass Olssen (born 1978), Norwegian sport shooter
- Jabez Olssen (born 1975), New Zealand film and television editor
- Lance Olssen (born 1947), American professional football offensive lineman
- Mark Olssen, FAcSS, political theorist and University of Surrey professor
