= Betty Herbertson =

Australian lawn bowler

Personal information
- Nationality: Australian
Medal record
Representing (Australia)
Asia Pacific Bowls Championships
Gold medal – first place	1993 Victoria	triples

Betty Herbertson is a former Australian international lawn bowler.

== Bowls career ==
Herbertson has represented Australia at the Commonwealth Games, in the fours at the 1994 Commonwealth Games in Victoria, Canada.

She won the triples gold medal (with Dorothy Roche and Audrey Rutherford) at the 1993 Asia Pacific Bowls Championships, also in Victoria.
