= Shirley Kelly =

Australian lawn bowler

Personal information
- Nationality: Australian
Medal record
Representing (Australia)
Asia Pacific Bowls Championships
Gold medal – first place	1985 Tweed Heads	triples
Silver medal – second place	1985 Tweed Heads	fours

Shirley Kelly is a former Australian international lawn bowler.

== Bowls career ==
Kelly was selected as part of the five woman team by Australia for the 1981 World Outdoor Bowls Championship, which was held in Toronto, Canada.

She won a triples gold medal (with Pat Smith and Norma Massey) and a fours silver medal, at the 1985 Asia Pacific Bowls Championships, held in Tweed Heads, Australia.
