= Janki Gaunder =

Personal information
- Nationality: Fijian

Sport
- Club: Lautoka Associates BC
Medal record
Representing (Fiji)
Asia Pacific Bowls Championships
Bronze medal – third place	1985 Tweed Heads	pairs
Gold medal – first place	1987 Lae	fours

Janki Gaunder née Reddy is a former Fijian international lawn bowler.

== Bowls career ==
Gaunder has represented Fiji at the Commonwealth Games, in the pairs event at the 1986 Commonwealth Games.

She won a fours gold medal with Willow Fong, Robin Forster and Betty Olssen at the 1987 Asia Pacific Bowls Championships and a pairs bronze medal two year earlier.
