= Mark Jacobsen =

Australian bowls player

Personal information
- Nickname: Dougie
- Nationality: Australian
- Born: 4 June 1968
- Occupation: Bowls Professional/Manager/Coach

Sport
- Club: Port Melbourne Bowls Club Melbourne Vic Aust
Medal record
Representing (Australia)
World Outdoor Championships
Bronze medal – third place	2000 Johannesburg	pairs
Gold medal – first place	2000 Johannesburg	team
Commonwealth Games
Gold medal – first place	1998 Kuala Lumpur	pairs
Asia Pacific Bowls Championships
Gold medal – first place	1999 Kuala Lumpur	pairs
Gold medal – first place	1999 Kuala Lumpur	fours
Gold medal – first place	2001 Melbourne	gold
Gold medal – first place	2009 Kuala Lumpur	pairs
Bronze medal – third place	2009 Kuala Lumpur	fours

Mark Jacobsen (born 1968) is an Australian international lawn and indoor bowler.

== Bowls career ==
In the 2000 World Outdoor Bowls Championship he won a bronze medal in the pairs with Brett Duprez.

He also won a gold medal in the pairs with Brett Duprez at the 1998 Commonwealth Games in Kuala Lumpur.

He won five medals at the Asia Pacific Bowls Championships, of which four have been gold medals.
