= Berghofer =

Berghofer is a surname. Notable people with the surname include:

- Chuck Berghofer (born 1937), American jazz double bassist and electric bassist
- Clive Berghofer (born 1935), Australian property developer, politician and philanthropist
- Gabriele Berghofer (born 1963), Austrian Paralympic skier and athlete
- Mark Berghofer (born 1985), Australian international lawn bowler

== See also ==
- Clive Berghofer Stadium, Toowoomba
- QIMR Berghofer, Brisbane
