= Mark Berghofer =

Australian lawn bowler

Personal information
- Nationality: Australian
- Born: 21 January 1985 (age 41) Southport, Queensland, Australia

Sport
- Country: Australia
- Sport: Lawn bowls
Medal record
Asia Pacific Bowls Championships
Gold medal – first place	2009 Kuala Lumpur	triples
Bronze medal – third place	2009 Kuala Lumpur	fours
Silver medal – second place	2011 Adelaide	triples
Gold medal – first place	2011 Adelaide	fours

Mark Berghofer (born 21 January 1985) is an Australian international lawn bowler.

== Bows career ==
Berghofer won the gold medal in the triples with Wayne Turley and Leif Selby and the bronze medal in the fours at the 2009 Asia Pacific Bowls Championships in Kuala Lumpur. Two years later he won another gold at the 2011 Championships in Adelaide, when winning the fours with Mark Casey, Aron Sherriff and Nathan Rice. he laso picked up a silver in the triples (his fourth medal in total).

He was selected to represent Australia at the 2010 Commonwealth Games in Delhi, where he competed in the pairs event.
