= Lufilufi Taulealo =

Samoan lawn bowler

Personal information
- Nationality: Samoan
- Born: 2 November 1947 (age 78)

Sport
- Club: Kowloon BC
Medal record
Representing (Samoa)
Asia Pacific Bowls Championships
Bronze medal – third place	2007 Christchurch	pairs

Faletuiatua Lufilufi Taulealo (born 1947) is a former Samoan international lawn bowler.

== Bowls career ==
Taulealo has represented Samoa at two Commonwealth Games, in the singles at the 2002 Commonwealth Games and the pairs at the 2006 Commonwealth Games .

She won a pairs bronze medal with (Manuia Porter) at the 2007 Asia Pacific Bowls Championships in Christchurch.
