= Lee Poletti =

Australia lawn bowler

Personal information
- Nationality: Australian
- Born: 6 March 1948 (age 78)

Sport
- Club: Geraldton BC
Medal record
Representing Australia
Commonwealth Games
Silver medal – second place	1998 Kuala Lumpur	Women's fours
Asia Pacific Bowls Championships
Silver medal – second place	1999 Kuala Lumpur	triples
Gold medal – first place	2001 Melbourne	triples
Gold medal – first place	2001 Melbourne	fours
Bronze medal – third place	2003 Brisbane	fours

Barbara Lee Poletti is a former Australia lawn bowls international.

== Bowls career ==
Poletti won a silver medal in the Women's fours at the Commonwealth Games in Kuala Lumpur with Karen Murphy, Margaret Sumner and Marilyn Peddell.

She also won two gold medals at the Asia Pacific Bowls Championships in the triples and fours. She was inducted into the Western Australia Hall of Fame in 2016.

She played for the state until 2013 and won ten state titles (6 fours, 2 pairs and 1 in singles and triples).
