= Kundi Miki =

Papua New Guinean lawn bowler

Personal information
- Nationality: Papua New Guinean
- Born: 15 May 1947 (age 79)
Medal record
Representing (Papua New Guinea)
Asia Pacific Bowls Championships
Bronze medal – third place	1995 Dunedin	triples

Kundi Miki (born 1947) is a former Papua New Guinea international lawn bowler.

== Bowls career ==
Miki has represented Papua New Guinea the Commonwealth Games, in the fours at the 1998 Commonwealth Games.

He won a bronze medal at the 1995 Asia Pacific Bowls Championships, in the triples in Dunedin.
