= Dan Delany =

New Zealand lawn bowler

Personal information
- Nationality: New Zealander
- Born: 1978 Auckland, New Zealand

Sport
- Sport: Lawn bowls
Medal record
Representing New Zealand
Asia Pacific Bowls Championships
Gold medal – first place	2011 Adelaide	pairs
Silver medal – second place	2011 Adelaide	fours

Daniel Delany (born 1978) is a New Zealand international lawn bowler.

== Bowls career ==
Delany won the gold medal in the pairs with Richard Girvan and the silver medal in the fours at the 2011 Asia Pacific Bowls Championships in Adelaide.

He was selected to represent New Zealand at the 2010 Commonwealth Games, where he competed in the pairs events.
