= Marie Watson =

New Zealand lawn bowler

Personal information
- Nationality: New Zealander
- Born: 1944 (age 81–82)

Sport
- Sport: Bowls
- Club: Linwood BC; Stoke BC; United, Nelson
Medal record
Representing New Zealand
World Outdoor Championships
Silver medal – second place	1992 Ayr	fours
Bronze medal – third place	1992 Ayr	team
Commonwealth Games
Gold medal – first place	1990 Auckland	pairs
Asia Pacific Bowls Championships
Silver medal – second place	1987 Lae	fours
Bronze medal – third place	1991 Kowloon	pairs
Silver medal – second place	1991 Kowloon	fours
Silver medal – second place	1993 Victoria	triples
Bronze medal – third place	1993 Victoria	fours
Gold medal – first place	1995 Dunedin	triples
Gold medal – first place	1995 Dunedin	fours
Silver medal – second place	1997 Warilla	triples
Silver medal – second place	1997 Warilla	fours

Marie Watson is a former international lawn bowler from New Zealand.

== Bowls career ==
She won a gold medal in the women's pairs with Judy Howat at the 1990 Commonwealth Games in Auckland.

Two years later she won a silver medal in the fours at the 1992 World Outdoor Bowls Championship in Ayr.

In addition to the major championship successes, Watson won nine medals at the Asia Pacific Bowls Championships, including two gold medals in the triples and fours during the 1995 tournament at Dunedin.

She has won six New Zealand National Bowls Championships titles; (1996, 1997, 1999 & 2003 singles), (1987 pairs) and (1995 fours) when bowling for various bowls clubs.
