= Doreen O'Connor =

Fijian lawn bowler

Personal information
- Born: 23 January 1950 (age 76) Lautoka, Colony of Fiji, British Empire

Sport
- Sport: Lawn bowls
Medal record
Representing Fiji
Asia Pacific Bowls Championships
Bronze medal – third place	2001 Melbourne	fours
Bronze medal – third place	2003 Brisbane	fours

Doreen O'Connor (born 1950) is a Fijian international lawn bowler.

== Bows career ==
O'Connor won the bronze medal in the fours at the 2011 Asia Pacific Bowls Championships in Melbourne. Two years later she won a second fours bronze at the 2003 Championships in Brisbane.

She was selected to represent Fiji at the 2014 Commonwealth Games, where she competed in the triples and fours events.
