= Vimla Swamy =

Fijian lawn bowler

Personal information
- Nationality: Fijian
- Born: 22 May 1941 (age 85)
Medal record
Representing (Fiji)
Asia Pacific Bowls Championships
Gold medal – first place	1989 Suva	pairs
Bronze medal – third place	1989 Suva	fours
Gold medal – first place	1991 Kowloon	fours

Vimla Swamy (born 1941) is a former Fijian international lawn bowler.

== Bowls career ==
Swamy has represented Fiji at the Commonwealth Games, in the fours event at the 1998 Commonwealth Games.

She won three medals at the Asia Pacific Bowls Championships, including two gold medals in the 1989 pairs at Suva and the 1991 fours at Kowloon.
