= Mohd Afendy Tan Abdullah =

Malaysian lawn bowler

Personal information
- Nationality: Malaysian
- Born: 15 August 1964 (age 61) Malaysia
Medal record
Representing (Malaysia)
Asia Pacific Bowls Championships
Silver medal – second place	2003 Brisbane	pairs
Bronze medal – third place	2003 Brisbane	singles

Mohd Afendy Tan Abdullah (born 1964) is a former Malaysian international lawn bowler.

== Bowls career ==
He has represented Malaysia at two Commonwealth Games; in the fours event at the 1998 Commonwealth Games and in the singles event at the 2006 Commonwealth Games. In 2004, he made it to the round four championship.

He won two medals at the Asia Pacific Bowls Championships.

He made his international debut in 1998 and is a state coach by trade.
