= Sonia Bruce =

Filipino lawn bowls player

Personal information
- Nationality: Filipino
- Born: 15 August 1966 (age 59) Sagay, Negros Occidental, Philippines

Sport
- Club: Angeles Sports and Country Club
Medal record
Women's lawn bowls
Representing Philippines
World Outdoor Championships
Bronze medal – third place	2016 Christchurch	fours
Asia Pacific Bowls Championships
Bronze medal – third place	2003 Brisbane	triples
Bronze medal – third place	2009 Kuala Lumpur	triples
Silver medal – second place	2011 Adelaide	triples
Bronze medal – third place	2015 Christchurch	pairs
Southeast Asian Games
Silver medal – second place	2005 Manila	triples
Bronze medal – third place	2007 Nakhon Ratchasima	triples
Bronze medal – third place	2017 Kuala Lumpur	pairs
Silver medal – second place	2019 Philippines	triples

Asuncion Yang Yang Bruce (born 1966) also known as Sonia Bruce is a Philippines international lawn bowler.

== Bowls career ==
Bruce competed in the 2008 World Outdoor Bowls Championship and 2012 World Outdoor Bowls Championship but came to prominence when winning a bronze medal at the 2016 World Outdoor Bowls Championship in Christchurch in the fours with Hazel Jagonoy, Rosita Bradborn and Ronalyn Greenlees.

In 2014 and 2016, she won the Hong Kong International Bowls Classic pairs titles, first with Ainie Knight and later with Rosita Bradborn.

She has won four medals at the Asia Pacific Bowls Championships, starting in 2003 in Brisbane, where she won a bronze medal in the triples with Lolita Treasure and Milagros Witheridge. Six years later she won a second bronze, again in the triples with Witheridge and Greenlees. Two years later in 2011, she won a silver in Adelaide with Witehridge and Joy Tordoff and finally in 2015 in Christchurch, she secured another bronze but this time in the pairs event with Ainee Knight.

In 2023, she was selected as part of the team to represent Philippines at the 2023 World Outdoor Bowls Championship. She participated in the women's triples and the women's fours events.
