= Maurice Symes =

New Zealand international lawn bowler

Personal information
- Nationality: New Zealander
- Born: 1945 (age 80–81)

Sport
- Sport: Lawn bowls
- Club: Hawera Park BC
Medal record
Representing New Zealand
Commonwealth Games
Bronze medal – third place	1990 Auckland	pairs
Asia Pacific Bowls Championships
Gold medal – first place	1985 Tweed Heads	pairs
Silver medal – second place	1987 Lae	fours
Bronze medal – third place	1989 Suva	triples

Maurice Symes is a former New Zealand international lawn bowler.

== Bowls career ==
=== Commonwealth Games ===
He competed in the singles at the 1986 Commonwealth Games in Edinburgh, Scotland. Four years later he won a bronze medal for New Zealand when he was part of the pairs team at the 1990 Commonwealth Games in Auckland, New Zealand. His pairs partner was Rowan Brassey.

=== Asia Pacific Championships ===
He won three medals at the Asia Pacific Bowls Championships including a gold medal in the 1985 pairs at Tweed Heads, New South Wales.

=== National ===
He won the 1985 pairs title with Geoff Hawken at the New Zealand National Bowls Championships when bowling for the Hawera Park Bowls Club. Remarkably 36 years later he won a second national title winning the fours with John Gray, Craig MacDonell and Steve Beel.
