= Dorothy Kane =

Northern Irish lawn bowler

Personal information
- Nationality: British (Northern Irish)

Sport
- Sport: Lawn bowls
- Club: Moat Park BC
Medal record
Representing combined Ireland
Atlantic Bowls Championships
Gold medal – first place	1999 Cape Town	triples
British Isles Championships
Gold medal – first place	1999	pairs

Dorothy Kane is a Northern Irish international lawn bowler.

== Bowls career ==
Kane won the triples gold medal at the 1999 Atlantic Bowls Championships with Margaret Johnston and Donna McNally.

Kane has also represented Ireland in the triples at the 2000 World Outdoor Bowls Championship.

She became an Irish national champion after winning the 1998 pairs with Ruth Simpson at the Irish National Bowls Championships bowling for the Moat Park Bowls Club. Subsequently the pair went on to win the 1999 British Isles Bowls Championships.
