= Peter Mutter =

Canadian lawn bowler

Personal information
- Nationality: Canadian
Medal record
Representing (Canada)
Asia Pacific Bowls Championships
Silver medal – second place	1989 Suva	triples
Bronze medal – third place	1989 Suva	fours
Bronze medal – third place	1991 Kowloon	triples

Peter Mutter is a former Canadian international lawn bowler.

== Bowls career ==
Mutter has represented Canada at two Commonwealth Games at the 1990 Commonwealth Games and the 1994 Commonwealth Games.

He won three medals at the Asia Pacific Bowls Championships.
