= Peter Shaw (bowls) =

New Zealand international lawn bowler

Personal information
- Nationality: New Zealander
- Born: 1954 (age 71–72) Palmerston North
Medal record
Representing New Zealand
Commonwealth Games
| Bronze medal – third place | 1990 Auckland | fours |
Asia Pacific Bowls Championships
| Gold medal – first place | 1997 Warilla | pairs |
| Gold medal – first place | 1997 Warilla | fours |

Peter Shaw is a former New Zealand international lawn bowler.

== Bowls career ==
He won a bronze medal at the 1990 Commonwealth Games in the fours with Kevin Darling, Phil Skoglund and Stewart McConnell.

He won two gold medals in the pairs and fours at the 1997 Asia Pacific Bowls Championships. and also competed at the 1998 Commonwealth Games in Kuala Lumpur in Malaysia.

He won the 1997 singles title, 1998 pairs title and 1997 & 1998 fours title at the New Zealand National Bowls Championships when bowling for the Northern and North Palmerston Bowls Clubs.

== Personal life ==
He is a company manager by trade.
