= Chris Stadnyk =

Canadian international lawn bowler (born 1974)

Personal information
- Nationality: Canadian
- Born: 10 October 1974 (age 51)

Sport
- Sport: Lawn bowls
- Club: Niagara Falls Lawn Bowling Club
Medal record
Representing Canada
World Outdoor Championships
Bronze medal – third place	2008 Christchurch	triples
Asia Pacific Bowls Championships
Silver medal – second place	2001 Melbourne	fours
Bronze medal – third place	2003 Brisbane	fours
Silver medal – second place	2007 Christchurch	triples
Bronze medal – third place	2007 Christchurch	fours

Christopher Stadnyk is a Canadian international lawn bowler.

== Bowls career ==
Stadnyk won the bronze medal in the triples with Keith Roney and Hiren Bhartu at the 2008 World Outdoor Bowls Championship in Christchurch.

He has won four medals at the Asia Pacific Bowls Championships, two silver and two bronze.

In November 2017, Stadnyk was named to Canada's 2018 Commonwealth Games team.
