= Audrey Rutherford =

Australian bowls player

Personal information
- Nationality: Australian
Medal record
Representing Australia
World Outdoor Championships
Silver medal – second place	1992 Ayr	singles
Commonwealth Games
Gold medal – first place	1990 Auckland	fours
Asia Pacific Bowls Championships
Silver medal – second place	1991 Kowloon	triples
Bronze medal – third place	1991 Kowloon	fours
Gold medal – first place	1993 Victoria	triples
Gold medal – first place	1995 Dunedin	pairs

Audrey Frances Rutherford is a former international lawn bowler from Australia.

== Bowls career ==
She won a gold medal in the women's fours with Daphne Shaw, Dorothy Roche and Marion Stevens at the 1990 Commonwealth Games in Auckland.

Two years later she won a silver medal in the singles at the 1992 World Outdoor Bowls Championship in Ayr.

She won four medals at the Asia Pacific Bowls Championships including two gold medals.
