= Wayne Nairn =

New Zealand lawn bowler

Personal information
- Nationality: New Zealander
Medal record
Representing (New Zealand)
Asia Pacific Bowls Championships
Gold medal – first place	1985 Tweed Heads	pairs
Bronze medal – third place	1985 Tweed Heads	fours

Wayne Nairn is a former New Zealand international lawn bowler.

== Bowls career ==
Nairn has represented New Zealand at the Commonwealth Games. He participated in the pairs at the 1986 Commonwealth Games.

He won two medals at the 1985 Asia Pacific Bowls Championships in Tweed Heads, New South Wales.
