= Millie Khan =

New Zealand lawn bowls competitor (1938–2003)

Millie Khan MBE
Personal information
- Born: 29 July 1938
- Died: 24 November 2003 (aged 65)
- Spouse: Ronald Amin Khan
- Relatives: Jan Khan (daughter); Marina Khan (daughter)

Sport
- Country: New Zealand
- Sport: Lawn bowls
- Club: Matamata Bowling Club

Achievements and titles
- National finals: 11 national titles
Medal record
Women's lawn bowls
Representing New Zealand
World Outdoor Bowls Championships
Bronze medal – third place	1988 Auckland	singles
Silver medal – second place	1992 Ayr	triples
Bronze medal – third place	1992 Ayr	team
Commonwealth Games
Silver medal – second place	1990 Auckland	Singles
Bronze medal – third place	1998 Kuala Lumpur	Singles
Asia Pacific Bowls Championships
Gold medal – first place	1985 Tweed Heads	Fours
Gold medal – first place	1989 Suva	Singles
Gold medal – first place	1995 Dunedin	Triples
Gold medal – first place	1995 Dunedin	Fours
Silver medal – second place	1985 Tweed Heads	Triples
Silver medal – second place	1989 Suva	Pairs
Silver medal – second place	1997 Warilla	Singles
Silver medal – second place	1997 Warilla	Pairs

Millie Cecilia Khan MBE (29 July 1938 – 24 November 2003) was a lawn bowls competitor for New Zealand.

== Personal life ==
Khan is of Māori descent through her mother, while her father was a Yugoslav emigrant. She married her husband Ron Khan, who is of Pakistani descent, when she was 16. Two of her daughters (Jan Khan and Marina Khan) were also New Zealand representative lawn bowlers.

== Bowls career ==
A competitor at four Commonwealth Games; she won a silver medal in the women's singles at the 1990 Commonwealth Games. She won a bronze medal in the same event at the 1998 Commonwealth Games.

She won eight medals at the Asia Pacific Bowls Championships including four gold medals.

Khan won a total of eleven New Zealand National Bowls Championships titles; four in the singles (1989, 1990, 1992 and 2000); two in the pairs (1994 and 2000) and five in the fours (1989, 1990, 1997, 2001 and 2002) bowling for the Matamata Bowling Club.

== Honours and awards ==
In the 1990 Queen's Birthday Honours, Khan was appointed a Member of the Order of the British Empire, for services to bowls.

In 2013, Khan was an inaugural inductee into the Bowls New Zealand Hall of Fame.
