= Kevin Darling (bowls) =

New Zealand international lawn bowler

Personal information
- Full name: Kevin Robert Darling
- Nickname: KD
- Nationality: New Zealand
- Born: 14 February 1947 Dunedin
- Died: 21 March 2020 (aged 73) Dunedin
- Occupation: Retired Bowls player

Sport
- Country: New Zealand
- Sport: Lawn bowls
- Club: Balmacewen BC; Caversham BC
Medal record
Representing New Zealand
World Outdoor Championships
| Bronze medal – third place | 1980 Melbourne | pairs |
| Bronze medal – third place | 1980 Melbourne | fours |
Commonwealth Games
| Bronze medal – third place | 1990 Auckland | fours |

Kevin Robert Darling is a former New Zealand international lawn bowler.

== Profile ==
He was born in Dunedin, New Zealand on 14 February 1947.

== Bowls career ==
He won a bronze medal in the pairs and a bronze medal in the fours at the 1980 World Outdoor Bowls Championship in Melbourne.

Ten years later he won a bronze medal at the 1990 Commonwealth Games in the fours with Peter Shaw, Phil Skoglund and Stewart McConnell.

He won the 1988 singles title and the 1973 & 1974 pairs titles at the New Zealand National Bowls Championships when bowling for the Balmacewen & Caversham Bowls Clubs.

In 1990, Darling was awarded the New Zealand 1990 Commemoration Medal.
