= Stewart McConnell =

New Zealand international lawn bowler

Personal information
- Nationality: New Zealander

Sport
- Club: Kaikorai BC
Medal record
Representing New Zealand
Commonwealth Games
Bronze medal – third place	1990 Auckland	fours
Asia Pacific Bowls Championships
Silver medal – second place	1985 Tweed Heads	triples
Bronze medal – third place	1985 Tweed Heads	fours
Bronze medal – third place	1989 Suva	pairs

Stewart McConnell is a former New Zealand international lawn bowler.

== Bowls career ==
He won a bronze medal at the 1990 Commonwealth Games in the fours with Kevin Darling, Phil Skoglund and Peter Shaw.

He won three medals in the Asia Pacific Bowls Championships and also competed at the 1986 Commonwealth Games in Edinburgh, Scotland. He won 21 club titles.

== Personal life ==
His brother Duncan also won 18 club titles.
