= Tim Mason (bowls) =

Canadian bowls player

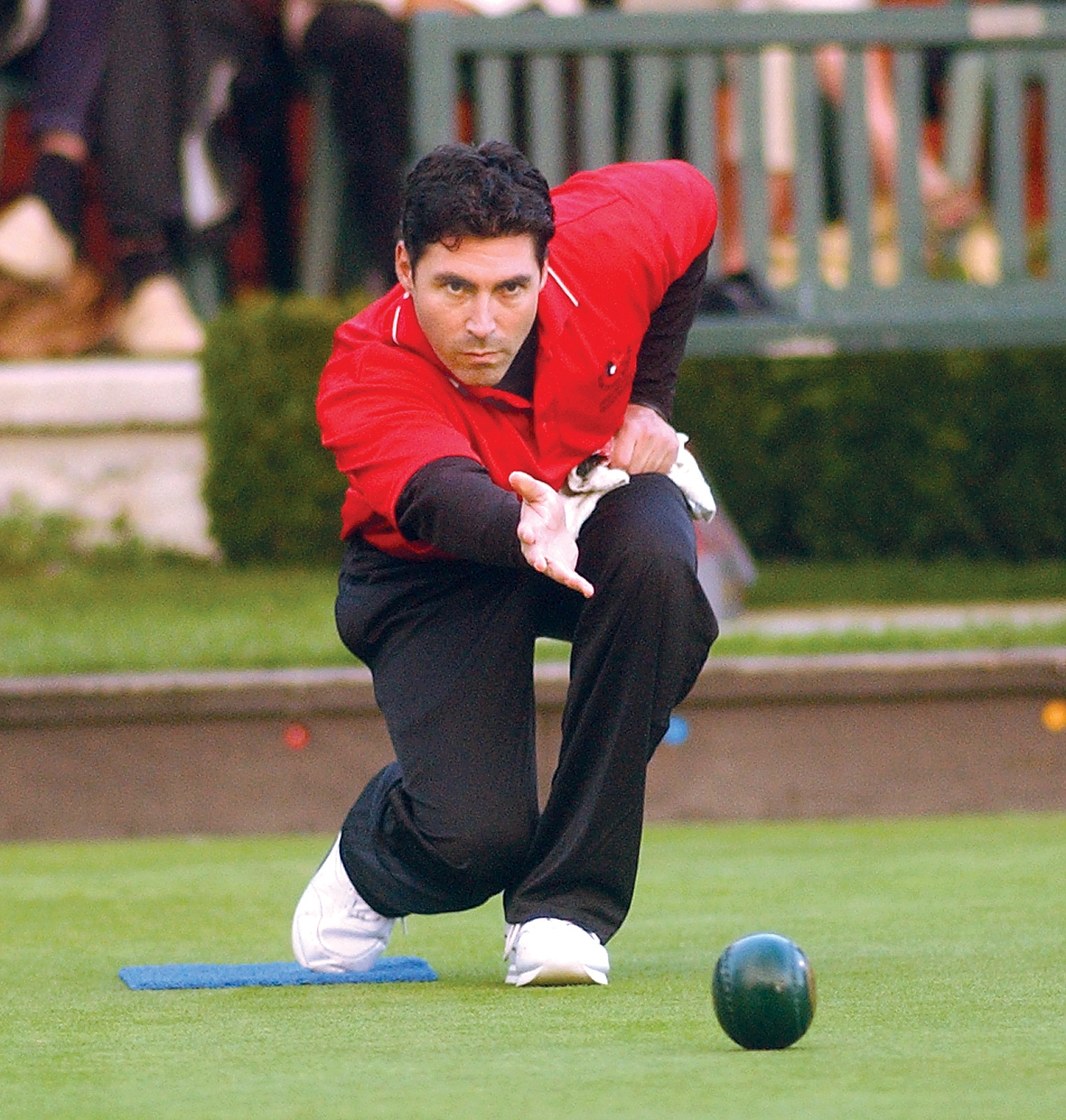
- Lawn Bowling – Tim Mason

Personal information
- Nationality: Canadian
- Born: 16 September 1974 (age 51) Midland, Ontario, Canada

Sport
- Sport: Lawn bowls
Medal record
Representing Canada
Asia Pacific Bowls Championships
Silver medal – second place	2007 Christchurch	triples
Bronze medal – third place	2007 Christchurch	fours
Bronze medal – third place	2011 Adelaide	pairs
Bronze medal – third place	2011 Adelaide	fours

Timothy Mason (born September 16, 1974) is a Canadian lawn bowler from Penetanguishene, Ontario.

== Bowls career ==
He is a two time Canadian champion and has won both outdoor and indoor Canadian National Championship titles. He first played for Canada at the 2006 World Cup in Australia becoming a member of the Canadian National Team.

He is a four time international medalist, having won his first at the 2007 Asia Pacific Bowls Championships in Christchurch, New Zealand (silver in the triples and bronze in the fours) and again at the 2011 Asia Pacific Championships in Adelaide, Australia (double bronze in the pairs and fours). Along with a North American Championship Gold.

He was selected as a member of the Canadian 2014 Commonwealth Games team that participated in Glasgow Scotland. He competed in the triples and fours events.

He has represented his country at indoor, outdoor and short mat international championship. Previously he was a professional hockey player and he used his sports background to make the jump to lawn bowling.

== Personal life ==
He currently resides in West Vancouver, BC and is the president of the West Vancouver LBC and the marketing and sport advancement coordinator for Bowls BC.
