= Arthur Black (bowls) =

Australian lawn bowler

Personal information
- Nationality: Australian
Medal record
Representing (Australia)
Asia Pacific Bowls Championships
Gold medal – first place	1985 Tweed Heads	fours
Silver medal – second place	1985 Tweed Heads	pairs

Arthur Marshall Black is a former Australian international lawn bowler.

== Bowls career ==
Black represented Australia in the pairs event at the 1986 Commonwealth Games.

He won two medals at the inaugural 1985 Asia Pacific Bowls Championships at Tweed Heads, New South Wales, including the fours gold medal with Keith Poole, Don Sherman and Wally Bonagura.
