= Iamo Ila =

Papua New Guinean lawn bowler

Personal information
- Nationality: Papua New Guinean
- Born: 25 November 1948 (age 77)
Medal record
Representing (Papua New Guinea)
Asia Pacific Bowls Championships
Bronze medal – third place	1995 Dunedin	triples

Iamo Ila (born 1948) is a former Papua New Guinea international lawn bowler.

== Bowls career ==
Ila has represented Papua New Guinea at two Commonwealth Games; in the fours at the 1994 Commonwealth Games and in the singles at the 1998 Commonwealth Games.

He won a bronze medal at the 1995 Asia Pacific Bowls Championships, in the triples in Dunedin.
