= Michael Wilks =

Australian lawn bowler

Personal information
- Nationality: Australian
- Born: 14 December 1973 (age 52)

Sport
- Club: Glen Elra/McKinnon BC
Medal record
Representing Australia
World Outdoor Championships
Silver medal – second place	2004 Ayr	fours
Asia Pacific Bowls Championships
Silver medal – second place	2003 Brisbane	triples
Gold medal – first place	2003 Brisbane	fours

Michael Wilks (born 14 December 1973) is a former Australian international lawn bowler.

== Bowls career ==
Wilks made his Australian debut in 2003 and won the silver medal in the fours at the 2004 World Outdoor Bowls Championship.

He won two medals at the 2003 Asia Pacific Bowls Championships in Brisbane.

He announced his international retirement in 2005 after only two years as an international.
