= Ratish Lal =

Fijian lawn bowler

Personal information
- Born: 25 December 1962 (age 63) Nabua, Colony of Fiji, British Empire

Sport
- Sport: Lawn bowls
Medal record
Representing Fiji
Asia Pacific Bowls Championships
Silver medal – second place	1995 Dunedin	fours
Bronze medal – third place	2007 Christchurch	pairs
Bronze medal – third place	2009 Kuala Lumpur	singles
Bronze medal – third place	2011 Adelaide	singles
Bronze medal – third place	2011 Adelaide	pairs

Ratish Lal (born 1962) is a Fijian international lawn bowler.

== Bows career ==
Lal has won five medals at the Asia Pacific Bowls Championships.

He was selected to represent Fiji at three Commonwealth Games; the fours at the 2002 Commonwealth Games, the triples at the 2006 Commonwealth Games, and the triples and fours at the 2014 Commonwealth Games.

He became the team manager for Fiji.
