= Peter Thaggard =

Personal information
- Nationality: Fijian
- Born: 3 September 1964 (age 61)
Medal record
Representing (Fiji)
Asia Pacific Bowls Championships
Bronze medal – third place	1985 Tweed Heads	pairs
Silver medal – second place	1995 Dunedin	fours

Peter Thaggard (born 1964) is a former Fijian international lawn bowler.

== Bowls career ==
Thaggard has represented Fiji at the Commonwealth Games, in the fours event at the 1998 Commonwealth Games.

He won two medals at the Asia Pacific Bowls Championships in 1985 and 1995 respectively.
