= Mark Sandford =

Personal information
- Nationality: Canadian
Medal record
Representing (Canada)
Asia Pacific Bowls Championships
Silver medal – second place	2001 Melbourne	fours
Bronze medal – third place	2007 Christchurch	pairs
Bronze medal – third place	2007 Christchurch	fours

Mark Sandford is a Canadian international lawn bowler.

== Bowls career ==
Sandford has represented Canada at two Commonwealth Games, in the pairs at the 1998 Commonwealth Games and in the triples at the 2006 Commonwealth Games.

He has won three medals at the Asia Pacific Bowls Championships. He has won three Canadian National titles.
