= Asia Pacific Bowls Championships =

International lawn bowling competition

Tournament information
- Sport: Lawn bowls
- Location: Various
- Established: 1985
- Defunct: 2021
- Administrator: World Bowls

The Asia Pacific Bowls Championships formerly the Pacific Rim Championships was a lawn bowling competition held between national bowls organisations in the Asia Pacific region. The event was inaugurated in 1985, and it was initially held every two years but then took place every four years and was a qualifying event for the World Outdoor Bowls Championships.

In 2021, the 2020 World Outdoor Bowls Championship was officially cancelled due to the COVID-19 pandemic. World Bowls then decided that the World Championships would take place every two years starting in 2023. This also resulted in the fact that qualifying events for the Championships were no longer required meaning the Atlantic Bowls Championships and Asia Pacific Championships were terminated.

== 1985 Tweed Heads, New South Wales, Australia ==
15-21 September (round robin - only 1 bronze awarded)

Event	Gold	Silver	Bronze
Men's Singles	(Fiji) Peter Fong	(Australia) Dennis Katunarich	(Hong Kong) David Tso
Men's Pairs	(New Zealand) Maurice Symes; Wayne Nairn	(Australia) Dennis Katunarich; Arthur Black	(Fiji) Peter Fong; Peter Thaggard
Men's Triples	(Hong Kong) George Souza Jr. M. B. Hassan Jr. David Tso	(New Zealand) Terry Scott; Jim Christie; Stewart McConnell	(Canada) Bob Scullion; Bert Walker; Alf Wallace
Men's Fours	(Australia) Keith Poole; Don Sherman; Arthur Black; Wally Bonagura	(Hong Kong) Noel Kennedy; Danny Ho; M. B. Hassan Jr. George Souza Jr.	(New Zealand) Terry Scott; Jim Christie; Wayne Nairn; Stewart McConnell
Women's Singles	(Australia) Merle Richardson	(New Zealand) Rhoda Ryan	(Hong Kong) Helen Wong
Women's Pairs	(New Zealand) Joyce Osborne; Rhoda Ryan	(Australia) Merle Richardson; Fay Craig	(Fiji) Willow Fong; Janki Gaunder
Women's Triples	(Australia) Pat Smith; Norma Massey; Shirley Kelly	(New Zealand) Millie Khan; Denise Page; Daphne Le Breton	(Hong Kong) Lilian Walton; Rosemary McMahon; Rae O'Donnell
Women's Fours	(New Zealand) Joyce Osborne; Millie Khan; Denise Page; Daphne Le Breton	(Australia) Pat Smith; Norma Massey; Shirley Kelly; Fay Craig	(Fiji) Willow Fong; Mari Seru; Filo O'Meagher; Robin Forster

== 1987 Lae BC, Lae, Papua New Guinea ==
25 October - 8 November sponsored by Mazda (bronze medal playoffs took place)

Event	Gold	Silver	Bronze
Men's Singles	(Australia) Ken Williams	(New Zealand) Rowan Brassey	Papua New Guinea
Men's Pairs	(Australia) Dennis Katunarich; Bill Wain	(Canada) Graham Jarvis	New Zealand
Men's Triples	(Australia) Darby Ross; Ken Williams; Trevor Morris	(Hong Kong) Keith Bosley; Clive Brindle; Bill McMahon	(Canada) Mark Gilliland; Bob Scullion; Kevin Jones
Men's Fours	(Papua New Guinea) Tau Nancie; Laka Rawali; Eddie Loa; Peter Pomaleu	(New Zealand) Maurice Symes; Ken Walker; Bill Kane; Sid Giddy	(Australia) Trevor Morris; Darby Ross; Dennis Katunarich; Bill Wain
Women's Singles	(Cook Islands) Ramona Ash	Australia	Papua New Guinea
Women's Pairs	(Fiji) Willow Fong; Maraia Lum On	(Hong Kong) Joan Humphreys; Rae O'Donnell	Cook Islands
Women's Triples	(Papua New Guinea) Cunera Monalua; Laureen Griffiths; Maggie Worri	Australia	(Canada) Alice Duncalf
Women's Fours	(Fiji) Willow Fong; Robin Forster; Betty Olssen; Janki Gaunder	(New Zealand) Jennie Simpson; Joyce Osborne; Judy Howat; Marie Watson	Papua New Guinea

== 1989 Suva, Fiji ==
Jul 8-21, sponsored by Mazda

Event	Gold	Silver	Bronze
Men's Singles	(Australia) Rob Parrella	(New Zealand) Ian Dickison	(Cook Islands) Philip Urlich
Men's Pairs	(Australia) Rob Parrella; Dennis Katunarich	(Hong Kong) Noel Kennedy; Mark McMahon	(New Zealand) Ian Dickison; Stewart McConnell
Men's Triples	(Australia) Rex Johnston; Terry McCabe; Ken Williams	(Canada) Peter Mutter; Dave Houtby; Bill Boettger	(New Zealand) Gary Lawson; Jim Scott; Maurice Symes
Men's Fours	(Australia) Rex Johnston; Terry McCabe; Dennis Katunarich; Ken Williams	(Hong Kong) Noel Kennedy; Mark McMahon; Ivan Ho; Mel Stewart	(Canada) Peter Mutter; Dave Houtby; Bill Boettger; Dave Brown
Women's Singles	(New Zealand) Millie Khan	(Fiji) Maraia Lum On	(Australia) Audrey Hefford
Women's Pairs	(Fiji) Maraia Lum On; Vimla Swamy	(New Zealand) Millie Khan; Lyn McLean	(Australia) Dorothy Roche; Betty Schenke
Women's Triples	(Australia) Greeta Fahey; Audrey Hefford; Di Cunnington	(New Zealand) Betty Fitzell; Adrienne Lambert; Marlene Castle	(Fiji) Willow Fong; Betty Olssen; Miri Seru
Women's Fours	(New Zealand) Betty Fitzell; Adrienne Lambert; Lyn McLean; Marlene Castle	(Australia) Greeta Fahey; Dorothy Roche; Betty Schenke; Di Cunnington	(Fiji) Willow Fong; Betty Olssen; Miri Seru; Vimla Swamy

== 1991 Kowloon CC & BC, Hong Kong ==
26 October - 10 November, sponsored by Mazda (bronze medal playoffs took place)

Event	Gold	Silver	Bronze
Men's Singles	(Australia) Rob Parrella	(Fiji) Caucau Turagabeci	(New Zealand) Peter Belliss
Men's Pairs	(Canada) Bill Boettger; Ronnie Jones	(Hong Kong) Noel Kennedy; Mark McMahon	(New Zealand) Peter Belliss; Rowan Brassey
Men's Triples	(Hong Kong) Mel Stewart; David Tso; George Souza Jr.	(Australia) Ian Schuback; Geoff Sutcliffe; Paul Richards	(Canada) Peter Mutter; Dave Brown; Dave Houtby
Men's Fours	(Canada) Bill Boettger; Dave Houtby; Dave Brown; Ronnie Jones	(Australia) Dennis Katunarich; Ian Schuback; Geoff Sutcliffe; Paul Richards	(Hong Kong) Mel Stewart; Noel Kennedy; David Tso; George Souza Jr.
Women's Singles	(Norfolk Island) Carmen Anderson	New Zealand	(Australia) Daphne Shaw
Women's Pairs	(Australia) Edda Bonutto; Daphne Shaw	(Fiji) Maraia Lum On; Radhika Prasad	(New Zealand) Marie Watson; Judy Howat
Women's Triples	(Hong Kong) Eva Ho; Linda Smith; Ching Lena Yeung	(Australia) Kathy McGowan; Maisie Flynn; Audrey Rutherford	Papua New Guinea
Women's Fours	(Fiji) Vimla Swamy; Betty Olssen; Phil Morrison; Radhika Prasad	(New Zealand) Judy Howat; Adrienne Lambert; Marlene Castle; Marie Watson	(Australia) Kathy McGowan; Maisie Flynn; Audrey Rutherford; Edda Bonutto

== 1993 Victoria BC, Victoria, British Columbia, Canada ==
25 July - 7 August, sponsored by Mazda (round robin, only 1 bronze)

Event	Gold	Silver	Bronze
Men's Singles	(Australia) Cameron Curtis	(New Zealand) Gary Lawson	
Men's Pairs	(Canada) Bill Boettger; Mark Gilliland	(Australia) Steve Srhoy; Cameron Curtis	(Hong Kong) Noel Kennedy; Mark McMahon
Men's Triples	(Australia) Steve Anderson; David Stockham; Sam Laguzza	New Zealand	Fiji
Men's Fours	(Australia) Steve Anderson; Steve Srhoy; David Stockham; Sam Laguzza	(Hong Kong) Mark McMahon; Danny Ho; Mel Stewart; Ken Wallis	(Canada) Keith Roney
Women's Singles	(Norfolk Island) Carmen Anderson	(New Zealand) Marlene Castle	
Women's Pairs	(Australia) Joy McKee; Kathy McGowan		
Women's Triples	(Australia) Dorothy Roche; Audrey Rutherford; Betty Herbertson	(New Zealand) Adrienne Lambert; Colleen Ferrick; Marie Watson	(Hong Kong) Angela Chau; Jenny Wallis; Ching Lena Yeung
Women's Fours	(Canada) Jean Roney; Margaret Richards; Margaret Fettes; Anita Nivala	(Hong Kong) Angela Chau; Jenny Wallis; Rae O'Donnell; Rosemary McMahon	(New Zealand) Adrienne Lambert; Ann Muir; Colleen Ferrick; Marie Watson

== 1995 Dunedin, New Zealand ==
22 November - 2 December, two bronze medals awarded

Event	Gold	Silver	Bronze	Bronze
Men's Singles	(Australia) Kelvin Kerkow	(New Zealand) Rowan Brassey	(Hong Kong) Noel Kennedy	(Norfolk Island) Norfolk Islands
Men's Pairs	(New Zealand) Rowan Brassey; Gary Lawson	(Australia) Steve Glasson; Rex Johnston	(Hong Kong) Noel Kennedy; Willie Lai	(Papua New Guinea) Martin Seeto; Albert Barakeina
Men's Triples	(New Zealand) Peter Belliss; David File; Andrew Curtain	(Australia) Kelvin Kerkow; Stephen Anderson; Sam Laguzza	(Canada) Ted Waterston; Keith Roney; Ian Jones	(Papua New Guinea) F Gabi; Kundi Miki; Iamo Ila
Men's Fours	(New Zealand) Peter Belliss; Gary Lawson; David File; Andrew Curtain	(Fiji) Peter Thaggard; Ram Karan Singh; Ram Shankar; Ratish Lal	(Hong Kong) Willie Lai; Danny Ho; Mel Stewart; Ken Wallis	(Australia) Stephen Anderson; Sam Laguzza; Steve Glasson; Rex Johnston
Women's Singles	(Norfolk Island) Carmen Anderson	(New Zealand) Judy Howat	(Hong Kong) Angela Chau	(Canada) Anita Nivala
Women's Pairs	(Australia) Audrey Rutherford; Norma Richardson	(New Zealand) Betty Prattley; Judy Howat	(Malaysia) Suhaimai Hamid; Saedah Abdul Rahim	(Samoa) Akenese Westerlund; Lagi Letoa
Women's Triples	(New Zealand) Marlene Castle; Millie Khan; Marie Watson	(Australia) Judy Nash; Roma Dunn; Margaret Sumner	(Malaysia) Nor Hashimah Ismail; Siti Hawa Ali; Haslah Hassan	(Cook Islands) Tanimetua Harry; Porea Elisa; Tremoana Damm
Women's Fours	(New Zealand) Betty Prattley; Marie Watson; Marlene Castle; Millie Khan	(Australia) Judy Nash; Norma Richardson; Roma Dunn; Margaret Sumner	(Canada) Maureen Thompson; Sharyl-Ann Milligan; Alice Duncalf; Jean Roney	(United States) Anne Barber; Mary Terrill; Heather Stewart; Evelyn Kenner

== 1997 Warilla BC & RC, Warilla, New South Wales, Australia ==
19 November - 1 December, (round robin, only 1 bronze)

Event	Gold	Silver	Bronze
Men's Singles	(New Zealand) Rowan Brassey	(Australia) Kelvin Kerkow	(Hong Kong) Noel Kennedy
Men's Pairs	(New Zealand) Peter Shaw; Rowan Brassey	Australia	(Hong Kong) Noel Kennedy; Anthony Carstairs
Men's Triples	(New Zealand) Peter Belliss; Russell Meyer; Andrew Curtain	Fiji	Singapore
Men's Fours	(New Zealand) Peter Belliss; Peter Shaw; Russell Meyer; Andrew Curtain	(Australia) John Noonan; Steve Glasson; Kevin Walsh; Rex Johnston	(Canada) Steve Wojcik; Kevin Jones; Keith Roney
Women's Singles	(Australia) Roma Dunn	(New Zealand) Millie Khan	Cook Islands
Women's Pairs	(Norfolk Island) Carmen Anderson; Essie Sanchez	(New Zealand) Millie Khan; Patsy Jorgensen	(Australia) Roma Dunn; Marilyn Peddell
Women's Triples	(Australia) Karen Murphy; Willow Fong; Margaret Sumner	(New Zealand) Marlene Castle; Marie Watson; Sharon Sims	(Hong Kong) Ching Lena Yeung; Angela Chau; Linda da Luz
Women's Fours	(Australia) Marilyn Peddell; Karen Murphy; Willow Fong; Margaret Sumner	(New Zealand) Marlene Castle; Marie Watson; Sharon Sims; Patsy Jorgensen	(Malaysia) Saedah Abdul Rahim; Nor Hashimah Ismail

== 1999 Bukit Kiara Bowls Complex, Kuala Lumpur, Malaysia ==
September 21-30

Event	Gold	Silver	Bronze	Bronze
Men's Singles	(Canada) Alan Webster	(Fiji) Caucau Turagabeci	(New Zealand) Andrew Curtain	
Men's Pairs	(Australia) Mark Jacobsen; Brett Duprez	Papua New Guinea	(United States) Ian Ho; Barry Pickup	
Men's Triples	(Australia) Rex Johnston; Steve Glasson; Adam Jeffery	Fiji	(Hong Kong) David Tso; Adam Poynton; James Cheng	(Singapore) Chai Hon Yoong; Ee Chong Beng; Spencer Arumugam
Men's Fours	(Australia) Rex Johnston; Mark Jacobsen; Adam Jeffery; Brett Duprez	Malaysia	(Hong Kong) Willie Lai; David Tso; James Cheng; Jacky Wong	Fiji
Women's Singles	(New Zealand) Marlene Castle	(Norfolk Island) Carmen Anderson	Malaysia	
Women's Pairs	(Australia) Karen Murphy; Willow Fong	Papua New Guinea	(Singapore) Mary Lim; Yong Lew Fong	(Malaysia) Nor Hashimah Ismail
Women's Triples	(New Zealand) Anne Lomas; Sharon Sims; Patsy Jorgensen	(Australia) Lee Poletti; Roma Dunn	(Hong Kong) Julia Wong; Linda Da Luz; Angela Chau	
Women's Fours	(New Zealand) Anne Lomas; Sharon Sims; Patsy Jorgensen; Jan Khan	(Malaysia) Nor Hashimah Ismail	(Canada) On-Kow Au; Martha Welsh; Sherrey Sidel; Susan Smith	

== 2001 Moama, Melbourne, Australia ==
22 October - 4 November

Event	Gold	Silver	Bronze	Bronze
Men's Singles	(Hong Kong) Noel Kennedy	(New Zealand) Sean Johnson	(United States) Merton Isaacman	(Australia) Steve Glasson
Men's Pairs	(New Zealand) Paul Girdler; Russell Meyer	(Samoa) Fa'imanu Tausisi	(Hong Kong) Noel Kennedy; Anthony Carstairs	(United States) Merton Isaacman; Ivan Ho
Men's Triples	(Australia) Rex Johnston; Adam Jeffery; Steve Glasson	(United States) Doug McArthur; Richard Broad; Ivan Hyland	(New Zealand) Sean Johnson; Rowan Brassey; Kerry Chapman	(Norfolk Island) Norfolk Islands
Men's Fours	(Australia) Rex Johnston; Adam Jeffery; Mark Jacobsen; Kelvin Kerkow	(Canada) Chris Grahame; Chris Stadnyk; Mark Sandford; Stephen Bezanson	(New Zealand) Paul Girdler; Russell Meyer; Rowan Brassey; Kerry Chapman	(Malaysia) Mohamed Aziz Maswadi; Ibrahim Jusoh; Mohammad Adif Daud; Mohamed Tazman Tahir
Women's Singles	(New Zealand) Marlene Castle	(Norfolk Island) Carmen Anderson	(Philippines) Milagros Witheridge	(Australia) Marilyn Peddell
Women's Pairs	(New Zealand) Jo Edwards; Sharon Sims	(Hong Kong) Danna Chiu; Anna Clarke	Cook Islands	(United States) Anne Nunes; Konia Spangler
Women's Triples	(Australia) Roma Dunn; Arrienne Wynen; Lee Poletti	(New Zealand) Marlene Castle; Anne Lomas; Patsy Jorgensen	(Hong Kong) Angela Chau; Stephanie Chung; Ching Lena Yeung	(Malaysia) Haslah Hassan; Nazura Ngahat; Bah Chu Mei
Women's Fours	(Australia) Roma Dunn; Karen Murphy; Arrienne Wynen; Lee Poletti	(New Zealand) Anne Lomas; Jo Edwards; Sharon Sims; Patsy Jorgensen	(Malaysia) Sarimah Abu Bakar; Haslah Hassan; Nazura Ngahat; Bah Chu Mei	(Fiji) Agnes Stephens; Doreen O'Connor; Sala Taylor; Radhika Prasad

== 2003 Pine Rivers Memorial BC, Brisbane Australia ==
25 November - 2 December

Event	Gold	Silver	Bronze	Bronze
Men's Singles	(New Zealand) Russell Meyer	(United States) Merton Isaacman	(Hong Kong) Noel Kennedy	(Malaysia) Mohd Afendy Tan Abdullah
Men's Pairs	(Canada) Keith Roney; Michel Larue	(Malaysia) Fairul Izwan Abd Muin; Mohd Afendy Tan Abdullah	(Hong Kong) Noel Kennedy; Adam Poynton	(Australia) Kelvin Kerkow; Steve Glasson
Men's Triples	(New Zealand) Gary Lawson; Sean Johnson; Jamie Hill	(Australia) Michael Wilks; Kevin Walsh; Bill Cornehls	(Hong Kong) Danny Ho; James Cheng; Jimmy Chiu	(Malaysia) Syed Mohamad Syed Akil; Zuraidi Puteh; Jozaini
Men's Fours	(Australia) Michael Wilks; Kevin Walsh; Bill Cornehls; Kelvin Kerkow	(New Zealand) Gary Lawson; Paul Girdler; Sean Johnson; Jamie Hill	(Canada) Chris Stadnyk; Michel Larue; Lyall Adams; John Devonshire	(Malaysia) Syed Mohamad Syed Akil; Fairul Izwan Abd Muin; Zuraidi Puteh; Jozaini
Women's Singles	(Philippines) Carmen Anderson	(New Zealand) Marlene Castle	(Australia) Karen Murphy	(Malaysia) Siti Zalina Ahmad
Women's Pairs	(Malaysia) Nazura Ngahat; Siti Zalina Ahmad	(Fiji) Litia Tikoisuva; Radhika Prasad	(Norfolk Island) Kitha Bailey; Essie Sanchez	(Papua New Guinea) Moata Nadu; Hedwig Labai
Women's Triples	(Malaysia) Haslah Hassan; Azlina Arshad; Nor Hashimah Ismail	(Canada) Andrea Stadnyk; Anita Nivala; Helen Culley	(Philippines) Milagros Witheridge; Lolita Treasure; Sonia Bruce	(Papua New Guinea) Janet Pat; Aiva Ned; Cecilia Drapok
Women's Fours	(New Zealand) Jo Edwards; Sharon Sims; Val Smith; Wendy Jensen	(Malaysia) Haslah Hassan; Azlina Arshad; Nazura Ngahat; Nor Hashimah Ismail	(Fiji) Litia Tikoisuva; Salanieta Gukivuli; Doreen O'Connor; Radhika Prasad	(Australia) Lynsey Armitage; Lee Poletti; Helen Bosisto; Maria Rigby

== 2005 Darebin International Sports Centre, Melbourne, Australia ==
7-16 November (bronze medal playoffs held)

Event	Gold	Silver	Bronze
Men's Singles	(Canada) Ryan Bester	(Fiji) Caucau Turagabeci	(Australia) Steve Glasson
Men's Pairs	(Malaysia) Safuan Said; Fairul Izwan Abdul Muin	(Australia) Mark Casey; Kelvin Kerkow	(Hong Kong) Pat Lai; Tony Tong
Men's Triples	(New Zealand) Gary Lawson; Justin Goodwin; Richard Girvan	Philippines	(United States) Jim Olson; Tony Baer; Doug McArthur
Women's Singles	(Fiji) Litia Tikoisuva	(Malaysia) Siti Zalina Ahmad	(New Zealand) Jo Edwards
Women's Pairs	(Australia) Karen Murphy; Lynsey Armitage	(Philippines) Rosita Bradborn; Ronalyn Greenlees	(New Zealand) Val Smith; Sharon Sims
Women's Triples	(Hong Kong) Grace Chu; Camilla Leung; Elizabeth Li	(Malaysia) Nor Hashimah Ismail; Azlina Arshad; Nor Iryani Azmi	(United States) Kathy Vea; Irene Webster; Kottia Spangler

== 2007 Burnside BC & Fendalton BC, Christchurch, New Zealand ==
13-21 January

Event	Gold	Silver	Bronze	Bronze
Men's Singles	(New Zealand) Ali Forsyth	(Canada) Ryan Bester	(Malaysia) Safuan Said	(Australia) Nathan Rice
Men's Pairs	(Australia) Nathan Rice; Leif Selby	(Hong Kong) Pat Lai; Danny Ho	(Canada) Ryan Bester; Mark Sandford	(Fiji) Ratish Lal; Arun Kumar
Men's Triples	(Australia) Mark Casey; Wayne Turley; Bill Cornehls	(Canada) Steve McKerihen; Chris Stadnyk; Tim Mason	(Malaysia) Mohd Amir Mohd Yusof; Azwan Shuhaimi; Khairul Annuar Abdul Kadir	(Singapore) Stephen Lo; Seah Wan Hin; Tan Kah Hock
Men's Fours	(Australia) Mark Casey; Wayne Turley; Leif Selby; Bill Cornehls	(New Zealand) Richard Girvan; Dwayne Cameron; Doug Wilson; Shannon McIlroy	(Hong Kong) Pat Lai; James Cheng; James Keung; Danny Ho	(Canada) Steve McKerihen; Chris Stadnyk; Mark Sandford; Tim Mason
Women's Singles	(New Zealand) Val Smith	(Australia) Karen Murphy	(Malaysia) Siti Zalina Ahmad	(Cook Islands) Porea Elisa
Women's Pairs	(Australia) Karen Murphy; Lynsey Clarke	(New Zealand) Val Smith; Mary Campbell	(Samoa) Lufilufi Taulealo; Manuia Porter	(Norfolk Island) Essie Sanchez; Debbie Wilford
Women's Triples	(Malaysia) Azlina Arshad; Nor Shafeeqah Yahya; Nur Fidrah Noh	(Australia) Julie Keegan; Claire Turley; Kelsey Cottrell	(New Zealand) Jan Khan; Marina Khan; Manu Timoti	(Cook Islands) Irene Tupuna; Porea Elisa; Kanny Vaile
Women's Fours	(New Zealand) Jan Khan; Marina Khan; Manu Timoti; Mary Campbell	(Malaysia) Nor Hashimah Ismail; Azlina Arshad; Nur Fidrah Noh; Nor Shafeeqah Yahya	(Hong Kong) Grace Chu; Wanis Sze; Camilla Leung; Elizabeth Li	(Australia) Ceri Ann Davies; Julie Keegan; Lynsey Clarke; Kelsey Cottrell

== 2009 National Lawn Bowls Complex, Bukit Kiara, Kuala Lumpur, Malaysia ==
8-16 August

Event	Gold	Silver	Bronze	Bronze
Men's Singles	(New Zealand) Ali Forsyth	(Australia) Leif Selby	(Fiji) Ratish Lal	(Malaysia) Safuan Said
Men's Pairs	(Australia) Mark Jacobsen; Robbie Thompson	(New Zealand) Gary Lawson; Jamie Hill	(China) Jacky Wong; Ye Sui Ying	(Malaysia) Fairul Izwan Abd Muin; Safuan Said
Men's Triples	(Australia) Leif Selby; Wayne Turley; Mark Berghofer	(New Zealand) Ali Forsyth; Shannon McIlroy; Shayne Sincock	(Hong Kong) Jerry Ng; Jimmy Chiu; Danny Ho	(Malaysia) Mohd Amir Mohd Yusof; Azwan Shuhaimi; Azim Azami Ariffin
Men's Fours	(Malaysia) Fairul Izwan Abd Muin; Azwan Shuhaimi; Mohd Amir Mohd Yusof; Azim Azami Ariffin	(Philippines) Angelo Morales; Christopher Dagpin; Leo Carreon; Ronald Lising	(Thailand) Chaithai Kancanakaphan; Tanangsak Klinson; Nakornsri Klimhom; Tanakrit Thamsorn	(Australia) Mark Jacobsen; Wayne Turley; Robbie Thompson; Mark Berghofer
Women's Singles	(Philippines) Rosita Bradborn	(Thailand) Songsin Tsao	(Australia) Kelsey Cottrell	(Malaysia) Siti Zalina Ahmad
Women's Pairs	(Malaysia) Nor Hashimah Ismail; Siti Zalina Ahmad	(Norfolk Island) Carmen Anderson; Debbie Wilford	(Philippines) Rosita Bradborn; Ainie Knight	(Australia) Karen Murphy; Lynsey Clarke
Women's Triples	(Malaysia) Azlina Arshad; Nur Fidrah Noh; Nor Shafeeqah Yahya	(Australia) Julie Keegan; Claire Turley; Kelsey Cottrell	(India) Rupa Rani Tirkey; Farzana Khan; Manisha Srivastava	(Philippines) Milagros Witheridge; Ronalyn Greenlees; Sonia Bruce
Women's Fours	(Malaysia) Nor Hashimah Ismail; Azlina Arshad; Nur Fidrah Noh; Nor Shafeeqah Yahya	(Brunei) Ajijah Muntol; Nabilah Salleh Chuchu; Fatmah Ibrahim; Siti Ervi Ferdarusamti Umar	(Hong Kong) Grace Chu; Peggy Ma; Winnie Wai; Elizabeth Cormack	(India) Rupa Rani Tirkey; Pinki; Tania Choudhury; Manisha Srivastava

== 2011 Lockleys BC & Holdfast Bay BC, Adelaide, Australia ==
30 November - 11 December

Event	Gold	Silver	Bronze	Bronze
Men's Singles	(Malaysia) Safuan Said	(Australia) Brett Wilkie	(China) Terence Lee	(Fiji) Ratish Lal
Men's Pairs	(New Zealand) Richard Girvan; Dan Delany	(Australia) Mark Casey; Brett Wilkie	(Canada) Ryan Bester; Tim Mason	(Fiji) Ratish Lal; Abdul Kalim
Men's Triples	(Fiji) Semesa Naiseruvati; Samuela Tuikiligana; Daniel Lum On	(Australia) Aron Sherriff; Nathan Rice; Mark Berghofer	(United States) Steve Nelson; Ian Ho; Loren Dion	(New Zealand) Ali Forsyth; Shaun Scott; Tony Grantham
Men's Fours	(Australia) Aron Sherriff; Nathan Rice; Mark Casey; Mark Berghofer	(New Zealand) Richard Girvan; Ali Forsyth; Dan Delany; Tony Grantham	(Malaysia) Soufi Rusli; Azwan Shuhaimi; Muhammad Hizlee Abdul Rais; Fairus Jabal	(Canada) Ryan Bester; John Aveline; Greg Wilson; Tim Mason
Women's Singles	(Malaysia) Siti Zalina Ahmad	(Australia) Kelsey Cottrell	(Norfolk Island) Carmen Anderson	(Fiji) Litia Tikoisuva
Women's Pairs	(New Zealand) Jo Edwards; Val Smith	(Philippines) Rosita Bradborn; Ainie Knight	(Malaysia) Siti Zalina Ahmad; Norzafirah Mohd Noor	(Australia) Karen Murphy; Natasha Scott
Women's Triples	(Australia) Lynsey Clarke; Rebecca Van Asch; Kelsey Cottrell	(Philippines) Milagros Witheridge; Sonia Bruce; Joy Tordoff	(New Zealand) Jan Khan; Genevieve Baildon; Leanne Curry	(Singapore) Mary Lim; Leng Li Li; Florence Leong
Women's Fours	(New Zealand) Jo Edwards; Jan Khan; Genevieve Baildon; Leanne Curry	(Australia) Karen Murphy; Lynsey Clarke; Rebecca Van Asch; Natasha Scott	(Canada) Marg Lepere; Harriette Pituley; Jacqueline Foster; Amanda Berg	(Japan) Hiroko Emura; Masako Satoh; Noriko Maebayashi; Atsumi Ono

== 2015 Burnside BC & Papanui BC, Christchurch - New Zealand ==
24 November - 6 December

Event	Gold	Silver	Bronze	Bronze
Men's Singles	(Australia) Aron Sherriff	(New Zealand) Mike Kernaghan	(Japan) Kenta Hasebe	(Malaysia) Muhammad Hizlee Abdul Rais
Men's Pairs	(Canada) Ryan Bester; Steve Santana	(Malaysia) Fairul Izwan Abd Muin; Muhammad Hizlee Abdul Rais	(New Zealand) Shannon McIlroy; Mike Kernaghan	(Australia) Nathan Rice; Ray Pearse
Men's Triples	(New Zealand) Paul Girdler; Andrew Kelly; Mike Nagy	(Japan) Kenta Hasebe; Kenichi Emura; Hisaharu Satoh	(Australia) Aron Sherriff; Mark Casey; Wayne Ruediger	(Fiji) Arun Kumar; David Aitcheson; Waisea Turaga
Men's Fours	(New Zealand) Paul Girdler; Shannon McIlroy; Andrew Kelly; Mike Nagy	(Australia) Mark Casey; Nathan Rice; Ray Pearse; Wayne Ruediger	(Hong Kong) Chun Yat Wong; Jason Choi; Tony Cheung; Terry Kung	(Malaysia) Soufi Rusli; Fairul Izwan Abd Muin; Zulhilmie Redzuan; Izzat Dzulkeple
Women's Singles	(Australia) Karen Murphy	(Norfolk Island) Carmen Anderson	(New Zealand) Jo Edwards	(Malaysia) Siti Zalina Ahmad
Women's Pairs	(Australia) Karen Murphy; Kelsey Cottrell	(Malaysia) Siti Zalina Ahmad; Emma Firyana Saroji	(Philippines) Ainie Knight; Sonia Bruce	(Norfolk Island) Carmen Anderson; Christine Jones
Women's Triples	(Philippines) Rosita Bradborn; Ronalyn Greenlees; Hazel Jagonoy	(Australia) Natasha Scott; Anne Johns; Carla Krizanic	(New Zealand) Sandra Keith; Angela Boyd; Katelyn Inch	(Fiji) Litia Tikoisuva; Sheral Mar; Elizabeth Moceiwai
Women's Fours	(Australia) Natasha Scott; Anne Johns; Kelsey Cottrell; Carla Krizanic	(United States) Myra Wood; Janice Bell; Anne Nunes; Candy DeFazio	(New Zealand) Sandra Keith; Val Smith; Angela Boyd; Katelyn Inch	(Malaysia) Nor Hashimah Ismail; Azlina Arshad; Nur Fidrah Noh; Emma Firyana Saroji

== 2019 Broadbeach BC, Helensvale BC & Musgrave Hill BC, Gold Coast, Australia ==
June 18 to 28

Event	Gold	Silver	Bronze	Bronze
Men's Singles	(New Zealand) Shannon McIlroy	(Canada) Ryan Bester	(Australia) Ray Pearse	(Hong Kong) Tony Cheung
Men's Pairs	(New Zealand) Shannon McIlroy; Gary Lawson	(Australia) Ray Pearse; Nathan Rice	(Canada) Ryan Bester; Rob Law	(Malaysia) Izzat Dzulkeple; Fairul Izwan Abd Muin
Men's Triples	(Australia) Barrie Lester; Aaron Teys; Aron Sherriff	(New Zealand) Mike Kernaghan; Jamie Hill; Ali Forsyth	(India) Naveet Rathi; Sunil Bahadur; Dinesh Kumar	(Malaysia) Soufi Rusli; Muhammad Hizlee Abdul Rais; Zulhilmie Redzuan
Men's Fours	(Australia) Barrie Lester; Aaron Teys; Nathan Rice; Aron Sherriff	(New Zealand) Mike Kernaghan; Jamie Hill; Gary Lawson; Ali Forsyth	(Malaysia) Soufi Rusli; Muhammad Hizlee Abdul Rais; Zulhilmie Redzuan; Fairul Izwan Abd Muin	(Canada) Rob Law; Pat Bird; Greg Wilson; Cam Lefresne
Women's Singles	(New Zealand) Jo Edwards	(Norfolk Island) Carmen Anderson	(Malaysia) Siti Zalina Ahmad	(India) Tania Choudhury
Women's Pairs	(Australia) Lynsey Clarke; Kelsey Cottrell	(Papua New Guinea) Piwen Karkar; Catherine Wimp	(Malaysia) Siti Zalina Ahmad; Nur Fidrah Noh	(New Zealand) Jo Edwards; Kirsten Edwards
Women's Triples	(Australia) Carla Krizanic; Natasha Scott; Rebecca Van Asch	(Malaysia) Auni Fathiah Kamis; Alyani Jamil; Azlina Arshad	(India) Tania Choudhury; Rupa Rani Tirkey; Sarita Tirkey	(Canada) Jacqueline Foster; Jordan Kos; Leanne Chinery
Women's Fours	(New Zealand) Wendy Jensen; Kirsten Edwards; Katelyn Inch; Val Smith	(Malaysia) Auni Fathiah Kamis; Alyani Jamil; Azlina Arshad; Nur Fidrah Noh	(Hong Kong) Gloria Ha; Cheryl Chan; Phyllis Wong; Angel So	(Australia) Carla Krizanic; Natasha Scott; Rebecca Van Asch; Lynsey Clarke

== See also ==
World Bowls Events
