= Judy Howat =

New Zealand lawn bowler

Judy Howat MNZM
Personal information
- Born: Judith Heather McLay; 20 May 1935 (age 91) Taumarunui, New Zealand
- Occupations: Hairdresser; taxi driver; computer operator

Sport
- Country: New Zealand
- Sport: Lawn bowls
- Club: Wellington Women's Bowling Club; Lyall Bay Bowling Club

Achievements and titles
- National finals: Singles champion (1988); Pairs champion (1999); Fours champion (2000)
Medal record
Women's lawn bowls
Representing New Zealand
World Outdoor Championships
Silver medal – second place	1992 Ayr	Fours
Bronze medal – third place	1992 Ayr	Team
Commonwealth Games
Gold medal – first place	1990 Auckland	Pairs
Asia Pacific Bowls Championships
Silver medal – second place	1987 Lae	Fours
Bronze medal – third place	1991 Kowloon	Pairs
Silver medal – second place	1991 Kowloon	Fours
Silver medal – second place	1995 Dunedin	Singles
Silver medal – second place	1995 Dunedin	Pairs

Judith Heather Howat MNZM (née McLay; born 20 May 1935) is a former New Zealand international lawn bowler. She won a gold medal representing her country in the women's pairs at the 1990 Commonwealth Games, and was part of the New Zealand women's four that finished second at the 1992 World Outdoor Bowls Championship.

== Early life and family ==
Howat was born Judith Heather McLay in Taumarunui on 20 May 1935, the daughter of Charles and Florence McLay. She was educated at Raurimu District High School. In 1955, she married Peter Charles Howat, and the couple went on to have four children.

Howat had a varied work career. She worked for the New Zealand Post Office for six years, and owned a hairdressing salon for six years. She spent seven years as a taxi driver, and was a computer operator for Wellington Newspapers for six years.

== Bowls career ==
At the 1990 Commonwealth Games in Auckland, Howat won the gold medal in the women's pairs with Marie Watson. In the final, they defeated Australia 23–13. Four years later, at the 1994 Commonwealth Games, Howat competed in the women's singles, finishing seventh.

At the 1992 World Outdoor Bowls Championship in Ayr, Howat won the silver medal in the women's fours, alongside Marlene Castle, Marie Watson and Adrienne Lambert. Paired with Marie Watson, she finished fourth in the women's pairs, losing to Zambia in the bronze-medal match. The New Zealand women won the women's team bronze medal.

She won five medals at the Asia Pacific Bowls Championships.

Howat won the 1988 singles title, the 1999 pairs title and the 2000 fours title at the New Zealand National Bowls Championships when bowling for the Wellington Bowling Club.

== Honours and awards ==
In 1990, Howat was awarded the New Zealand 1990 Commemoration Medal. In the 2005 New Year Honours, she was appointed a Member of the New Zealand Order of Merit, for services to lawn bowls. In 2013, she was inducted into the Bowls New Zealand Hall of Fame and the Sport Legends of Wellington.
