= Nor Shafeeqah Yahya =

Malaysian international lawn bowler

Personal information
- Nationality: Malaysian

Sport
- Sport: Lawn bowls
Medal record
Representing Malaysia
World Outdoor Championships
Bronze medal – third place	2008 Christchurch	fours
Bronze medal – third place	2008 Christchurch	team
Asia Pacific Bowls Championships
Gold medal – first place	2007 Christchurch	triples
Silver medal – second place	2007 Christchurch	fours
Gold medal – first place	2009 Kuala Lumpur	triples
Gold medal – first place	2009 Kuala Lumpur	fours

Nor Shafeeqah Yahya is a Malaysian international lawn bowler.

== Bowls career ==
Yahya won the bronze medal in the fours at the 2008 World Outdoor Bowls Championship in Christchurch.

She has won three gold medals and one silver medal at the Asia Pacific Bowls Championships.
