= Claire Turley =

Australian bowls player

Claire Turley née Claire Duke
Personal information
- Nationality: Australian
- Born: Claire Duke; 25 July 1983 (age 42) Tongala
Medal record
Representing Australia
Commonwealth Games
Silver medal – second place	2010 Delhi	Women's triples
World Outdoor Championships
Gold medal – first place	2008 Christchurch	Women's fours
Silver medal – second place	2008 Christchurch	Women's triples
Gold medal – first place	2008 Christchurch	Women's team
Asia Pacific Bowls Championships
Silver medal – second place	2007 Christchurch	triples
Silver medal – second place	2009 Kuala Lumpur	triples

Claire Turley née Duke is an Australian international Lawn Bowls player.

== Bowls career ==
In 2010, she won the silver medal in the triples at the 2010 Commonwealth Games in the Women's triples event.

She has won two silver medals at the Asia Pacific Bowls Championships.

In 2023, Turley won the Australian National Bowls Championships pairs title with Lynsey Clarke.

== Personal life ==
She married fellow Australian bowls international Wayne Turley in 2013.
