= Hannah Smith (bowls) =

Welsh-born Scottish international lawn and indoor bowler

Personal information
- Nationality: British (Welsh & Scottish)
- Born: 14 July 1986 (age 39) Carmarthen, Wales

Sport
- Sport: Lawn and indoor bowls
- Club: Carmarthen BC
Medal record
Representing Wales
World Outdoor Championships
Bronze medal – third place	2008 Christchurch	Women's triples
Silver medal – second place	2008 Christchurch	Women's fours
Bronze medal – third place	2012 Adelaide	Women's fours
Commonwealth Games
Bronze medal – third place	2010 Delhi	Women's pairs
Atlantic Bowls Championships
Gold medal – first place	2009 Johannesburg	Women's fours
Representing Scotland
British Isles Bowls Championships
Gold medal – first place	2022 Llandrindod Wells	pairs

Hannah Smith (born 14 July 1986) is a Scottish and former Welsh international lawn and indoor bowler.

== Biography ==
Smith from Carmarthen won the fours gold medal at the 2009 Atlantic Bowls Championships.

She then won a bronze medal in the pairs at the 2010 Commonwealth Games in Delhi and two years later won another bronze in the triples at the 2012 World Outdoor Bowls Championship in Adelaide.

Smith later represented Scotland and in 2019 she won the Scottish National Bowls Championships pairs title with Claire Johnston. Smith and Johnston then went on to win the 2022 pairs title at the British Isles Bowls Championships in Llandrindod Wells.

Smith will represent Scotland at the 2022 Commonwealth Games. In 2022, she duly competed in the women's pairs and the Women's fours at the Games.
