= Akenese Westerlund =

Samoan lawn bowler

Personal information
- Nationality: Samoan
Medal record
Representing (Samoa)
Asia Pacific Bowls Championships
Bronze medal – third place	1995 Dunedin	pairs

Akenese Westerlund is a former Samoan international lawn bowler.

== Bowls career ==
Westerlund has represented Samoa at three Commonwealth Games; in the pairs at the 1994 Commonwealth Games and in the fours at the 1998 Commonwealth Games and 2010 Commonwealth Games.

She won a pairs bronze medal (with Lagi Letoa) at the 1995 Asia Pacific Bowls Championships in Dunedin.
