= Ronalyn Greenlees =

Filipino lawn bowler

Vilma 'Ronalyn' Greenlees
Personal information
- Nationality: Filipino
- Born: 20 January 1971 (age 55) Pasacao, Camarines Sur, Philippines

Sport
- Club: Angeles Sports and Country Club
Medal record
Women's lawn bowls
Representing Philippines
World Outdoor Championships
Bronze medal – third place	2016 Christchurch	fours
Asia Pacific Bowls Championships
Silver medal – second place	2005 Melbourne	pairs
Bronze medal – third place	2009 Kuala Lumpur	triples
Gold medal – first place	2015 Christchurch	triples
Southeast Asian Games
Silver medal – second place	2001 Kuala Lumpur	pairs
Bronze medal – third place	2005 Manila	pairs
Bronze medal – third place	2007 Nakhon Ratchasima	triples
Silver medal – second place	2017 Kuala Lumpur	triples
Bronze medal – third place	2019 Philippines	pairs

Vilma Redima Greenlees (born 1971) also known as Ronalyn Greenlees is a Philippines international lawn bowler.

== Biography ==
She reached the final eight in the pairs at the 2008 World Outdoor Bowls Championship but came to prominence when winning the triples gold medal at the 2015 Asia Pacific Bowls Championships.

She won the bronze medal at the 2016 World Outdoor Bowls Championship in Christchurch in the fours with Hazel Jagonoy, Rosita Bradborn and Sonia Bruce.

In 2020, she was selected for the 2020 World Outdoor Bowls Championship in Australia but the event was cancelled due to the COVID-19 pandemic.

In 2023, she was selected as part of the team to represent Philippines at the 2023 World Outdoor Bowls Championship. She participated in the women's triples and the women's fours events.

Greenlees acted as the tournament director for the 16th Asian Lawn Bowls Championship in Clark City, Philippines.
