= Patsy Jorgensen =

Personal information
- Nationality: New Zealander
- Born: 24 March 1943 (age 83)

Sport
- Sport: Lawn bowls
- Club: Tauranga South BC
Medal record
Representing New Zealand
World Outdoor Championships
| Gold medal – first place | 2000 Moama | Fours |
| Gold medal – first place | 2000 Moama | Triples |
Commonwealth Games
| Bronze medal – third place | 2002 Manchester | Fours |
Asia Pacific Bowls Championships
| Silver medal – second place | 1997 Warilla | pairs |
| Silver medal – second place | 1997 Warilla | fours |
| Gold medal – first place | 1999 Kuala Lumpur | triples |
| Gold medal – first place | 1999 Kuala Lumpur | fours |
| Silver medal – second place | 2001 Melbourne | triples |
| Silver medal – second place | 2001 Melbourne | fours |

Patsy Jorgensen (born 24 March 1943 in Wairoa, New Zealand) is a lawn bowls competitor for New Zealand.

== Bowls career ==
She won double gold at the 2000 World Outdoor Bowls Championship in Moama, Australia when winning the triples and fours events.

Jorgsensen also won a bronze medal in the women's fours at the 2002 Commonwealth Games.

She won six medals at the Asia Pacific Bowls Championships including a 1999 double gold success in Kuala Lumpur.

Jorgensen won the 2003 fours title at the New Zealand National Bowls Championships when bowling for the Tauranga South Bowls Club.
