= Julie Keegan =

Australian lawn bowler

Personal information
- Nationality: Australian
- Born: 11 July 1964 (age 62)

Sport
- Country: Australia
- Sport: Lawn bowls
Medal record
Representing Australia
Women's Lawn bowls
Commonwealth Games
Silver medal – second place	2010 Delhi	Women's triples
World Outdoor Championships
Gold medal – first place	2008 Christchurch	Women's fours
Silver medal – second place	2008 Christchurch	Women's triples
Gold medal – first place	2008 Christchurch	Women's team
Asia Pacific Bowls Championships
Silver medal – second place	2007 Christchurch	triples
Bronze medal – third place	2007 Christchurch	fours
Silver medal – second place	2009 Kuala Lumpur	triples

Julie Keegan is a female Australian international lawn bowls player.

== Bowls career ==
Keegan won the singles title at the 2006 Australian Open and two years later she won the gold medal in the fours and silver medal in the triples at the 2008 World Championships. Two years later she won a silver medal at the 2010 Commonwealth Games in the Women's triples event.

In addition she has won three medals at Asia Pacific Championships. In 2007 a triples silver and fours bronze and in 2009 a triples silver. Keegan had played in over 100 test matches for Australia. Keegan has won the Hong Kong International Bowls Classic pairs title twice, twice (with Kelsey Cottrell) in 2009 and 2010.

In 2019 she won the Australian National Bowls Championships pairs with Katelyn Inch.

== Awards ==
In 2011 she was one of two finalists for Bowls Australia’s female bowler of the year, and in 2010 she was nominated for Hyundai Queensland Sportswoman of the year award.

== Personal life ==
Keegan is married with two children and lives on the Gold Coast in Queensland, Australia.
