= Essie Sanchez =

Norfolk Islander lawn bowler

Personal information
- Nationality: Norfolk Islander
- Born: 22 April 1958 (age 68) Jimenez, Misamis Occidental, Philippines

Sport
- Sport: Lawn bowls
Medal record
Representing Norfolk Island
Asia Pacific Bowls Championships
Gold medal – first place	1997 Warilla	pairs
Bronze medal – third place	2003 Brisbane	pairs
Bronze medal – third place	2007 Christchurch	pairs

Esterina Sanchez (born 22 April 1958), known as Essie Sanchez, is a Philippine-born Norfolk Islander international lawn bowler.

== Bows career ==
Sanchez won the gold medal in the pairs with Carmen Anderson at the 1997 Asia Pacific Bowls Championships in Warilla. Six years later she won a pairs bronze in Warilla and then won a third medal at the Atlantic Championships during the 2007 tournament in Christchurch.

She was selected to represent the Norfolk Islands at four Commonwealth Games. The first was in the singles at the 2006 Commonwealth Games, the second in the pairs at the 2010 Commonwealth Games and the third in the pairs and fours at the 2014 Commonwealth Games.

In 2022, she competed in her fourth Games at the 2022 Commonwealth Games in the women's triples and the Women's fours.
