= Anne Lomas =

Personal information
- Born: 2 July 1953 (age 72) Helensville, New Zealand

Sport
- Country: New Zealand
- Sport: Lawn bowls
Medal record
Representing New Zealand
World Outdoor Championships
Gold medal – first place	2000 Moama	Fours
Gold medal – first place	2000 Moama	Triples
Commonwealth Games
Bronze medal – third place	2002 Manchester	Fours
Asia Pacific Bowls Championships
Gold medal – first place	1999 Kuala Lumpur	triples
Gold medal – first place	1999 Kuala Lumpur	fours
Silver medal – second place	2001 Melbourne	triples
Silver medal – second place	2001 Melbourne	gfours

Anne Lomas (born 2 July 1953 in Helensville, New Zealand) is an international lawn bowls competitor for New Zealand.

== Bowls career ==
She won double gold at the 2000 World Outdoor Bowls Championship in Moama, Australia when winning the triples and fours events.

Lomas also won bronze medal in the women's fours at the 2002 Commonwealth Games.

She won four medals at the Asia Pacific Bowls Championships, of which two have been gold medals.
