= Kitha Bailey =

Norfolk Islander lawn bowler

Personal information
- Nationality: Norfolk Islander
- Born: 31 January 1950 (age 76)
Medal record
Representing (Norfolk Island)
Asia Pacific Bowls Championships
Bronze medal – third place	2003 Brisbane	pairs

Kathleen Margret Bailey (born 31 January 1950) is a former Norfolk Islands international lawn bowler.

== Bowls career ==
Bailey made her international debut in 1994 and has represented the Norfolk Islands at three Commonwealth Games; at the 2002 Commonwealth Games, the 2006 Commonwealth Games and the 2010 Commonwealth Games.

She won a bronze medal at the 2003 Asia Pacific Bowls Championships.
