= Beatrix Lamprecht =

Personal information
- Nationality: Namibian

Sport
- Sport: lawn bowls
Medal record
Representing Namibia
Atlantic Bowls Championships
Bronze medal – third place	2009 Johannesburg	triples

Beatrix Lamprecht is a Namibian international lawn bowler.

== Bowls career ==
She won a silver medal in triples at the 2009 Atlantic Bowls Championships in Johannesburg.

She was selected to represent Namibia at the 2010 Commonwealth Games, where she competed in the triples event.
