= Brett Duprez =

Australian lawn bowler

Brett Adrian Duprez
Personal information
- Nationality: Australian
- Born: 12 February 1975 (age 51)

Sport
- Club: St John's Park BC
Medal record
Representing Australia
World Outdoor Championships
Bronze medal – third place	2000 Johannesburg	pairs
Gold medal – first place	2000 Johannesburg	team
Silver medal – second place	2004 Ayr	fours
Commonwealth Games
Gold medal – first place	1998 Commonwealth Games	pairs
Asia Pacific Bowls Championships
Gold medal – first place	1999 Kuala Lumpur	pairs
Gold medal – first place	1999 Kuala Lumpur	fours

Brett Duprez (born 1975) is a former Australian international lawn bowler.

== Bowls career ==
Duprez won the gold medal in the pairs at the 1998 Commonwealth Games in Kuala Lumpur.

He has twice won medals at the World Bowls Championship, a bronze in the pairs at the 2000 World Outdoor Bowls Championship and a silver in the fours at the 2004 World Outdoor Bowls Championship.

He won double gold at the 1999 Asia Pacific Bowls Championships in Kuala Lumpur.

== Retirement and awards ==
He announced his international retirement in 2005. He was inducted into the Bowls NSW Hall of Fame in 2012.

In 2018 Bowls NSW named The Brett Duprez Development Series, a NSW 7-a-side competition, after him.
