= Ainie Knight =

Filipino lawn bowler

Personal information
- Nationality: Filipino
- Born: 24 May 1986 (age 40) Sagay, Negros Occidental

Achievements and titles
- Highest world ranking: 37 (September 2024)
Medal record
Representing Philippines
World Outdoor Championships
Bronze medal – third place	2012 Adelaide	Women's pairs
Asia Pacific Bowls Championships
Bronze medal – third place	2009 Kuala Lumpur	pairs
Silver medal – second place	2011 Adelaide	pairs
Bronze medal – third place	2015 Christchurch	pairs
Southeast Asian Games
Silver medal – second place	2007 Nakhon Ratchasima	Triples
Bronze medal – third place	2017 Kuala Lumpur	Pairs
Silver medal – second place	2019 Philippines	Triples
Asian Lawn Bowls Championship
Gold medal – first place	2024 Pattaya	triples
Gold medal – first place	2025 Clark	fours

Ainie Abatayo Knight (born 24 May 1986) is a Philippines international lawn and indoor bowler. She reached a career high ranking of world number 37 in September 2024.

== Biography ==
Knight from Sagay, Negros Occidental, in the Philippines won a bronze medal in the pairs at the 2012 World Outdoor Bowls Championship in Adelaide.

She has won three medals in the pairs at the Asia Pacific Bowls Championships. In 2014, she won the Hong Kong International Bowls Classic pairs title with Sonia Bruce.

In 2020, she was selected for the 2020 World Outdoor Bowls Championship in Australia but the event was cancelled due to the COVID-19 pandemic.

Knight won the gold medal in the triples at the 15th Asian Lawn Bowls Championship, held in Pattaya, Thailand, during March 2024. In 2025 she won a gold medal in the fours at the 16th Asian Lawn Bowls Championship in Clark City, Philippines.
