= Samuel Herbertson =

Scottish footballer

Personal information
- Full name: Samuel Herbertson
- Date of birth: 1889
- Place of birth: Irvine, Scotland
- Date of death: 12 July 1915 (aged 26)
- Place of death: Gallipoli, Ottoman Turkey
- Position: Goalkeeper

Senior career*
Years	Team	Apps	(Gls)
–1913	Beith		
1913–1914	Ayr United	13	(0)
- * Club domestic league appearances and goals

Samuel Herbertson (1889 – 12 July 1915) was a Scottish professional footballer who played in the Scottish League for Ayr United as a goalkeeper.

== Personal life ==
Soon after the outbreak of the First World War in August 1914, Herbertson enlisted as a private in the Royal Scots Fusiliers. He was killed in action at Gallipoli on 12 July 1915 and is commemorated on the Helles Memorial.
