= Patricia Smith (bowls) =

Australian international lawn bowler

Pat Smith
Personal information
- Born: 1920 Murwillumbah, New South Wales, Australia
- Died: 2017 (aged 96–97)

Sport
- Club: Murwillumbah BC
Medal record
Representing Australia
Commonwealth Games
Silver medal – second place	1986 Edinburgh	fours
Asia Pacific Bowls Championships
Gold medal – first place	1985 Tweed Heads	triples
Silver medal – second place	1985 Tweed Heads	fours

Patricia Josephine Smith (1920–2017) was an Australian international lawn bowler.

== Bowls career ==
Pat was part of the fours team that won a silver medal at the 1986 Commonwealth Games in Edinburgh. She had previously competed at the 1982 Commonwealth Games.

She also won a gold medal and a silver medal, at the 1985 Asia Pacific Bowls Championships in Tweed Heads, New South Wales and bowled for New South Wales from 1972-1987.

== Awards ==
She was awarded the Australian Sports Medal in 2000 and the Member of the Order of Australia in 1989 for services to bowls.
