= Betty Olssen =

Fijian international lawn bowler

Personal information
- Nationality: Fijian
Medal record
Representing (Fiji)
Asia Pacific Bowls Championships
Gold medal – first place	1987 Lae	fours
Bronze medal – third place	1989 Suva	triples
Bronze medal – third place	1989 Suva	fours
Gold medal – first place	1991 Kowloon	fours

Betty Olssen is a former Fijian international lawn bowler.

== Bowls career ==
Olssen has represented Fiji at the Commonwealth Games, in the fours event at the 1986 Commonwealth Games.

She won four medals at the Asia Pacific Bowls Championships including two gold medals in the fours.
