= Wayne Turley =

Australian bowls player

Personal information
- Nationality: Australian
- Born: 2 November 1972 (age 53)

Sport
- Sport: Bowls
- Club: Taren Point BC
Medal record
Representing Australia
Commonwealth Games
Gold medal – first place	2006 Victoria	Men's triples
Silver medal – second place	2010 Delhi	Men's triples
World Outdoor Championships
Silver medal – second place	2008 Christchurch	Men's fours
Silver medal – second place	2008 Christchurch	Men's team
Asia Pacific Bowls Championships
Gold medal – first place	2007 Christchurch	triples
Gold medal – first place	2007 Christchurch	fours
Gold medal – first place	2009 Kuala Lumpur	triples
Bronze medal – third place	2009 Kuala Lumpur	fours

Wayne William Turley OAM (born 2 November 1972) is an Australian international lawn and indoor bowler.

== Bowls career ==
In 2006 he won a gold medal in the men's triples at the 2006 Commonwealth Games. He won a silver medal four years later at the 2010 Commonwealth Games in Delhi.

In between he won a silver medal at the 2008 World Outdoor Bowls Championship. He married fellow Australian bowls international Claire Duke in 2013.

He won three gold medals and one silver medal at the Asia Pacific Bowls Championships.

Despite being Australian he won the 2005 fours title at the New Zealand National Bowls Championships when bowling for the Taren Point Bowls Club.
