= Milagros Witheridge =

Philippines lawn and indoor bowler

Personal information
- Nationality: Filipino
Medal record
Women's lawn bowls
Representing Philippines
World Outdoor Championships
Bronze medal – third place	2012 Adelaide	Women's pairs
Asia Pacific Bowls Championships
Bronze medal – third place	2001 Melbourne	singles
Bronze medal – third place	2003 Brisbane	triples
Bronze medal – third place	2009 Kuala Lumpur	triples
Silver medal – second place	2011 Adelaide	triples
Southeast Asian Games
Bronze medal – third place	2007 Nakhon Ratchasima	Triples

Milagros Witheridge also known as Maila is a Philippines international lawn and indoor bowler.

== Bowls career ==
Witheridge won a bronze medal in the pairs at the 2012 World Outdoor Bowls Championship in Adelaide with Ainie Knight.

She has also won four medals at the Asia Pacific Bowls Championships; two silvers and a bronze in the triples events and a singles bronze medal in 2001.
