= Dorothy Roche =

Australian international lawn bowls player

Personal information
- Nationality: Australian
- Born: 1928
- Died: 11 November 2021 (aged 93)

Sport
- Club: Merrylands Bowling Club
Medal record
Representing Australia
World Outdoor Championships
Gold medal – first place	1985 Melbourne	triples
Silver medal – second place	1985 Melbourne	fours
Gold medal – first place	1985 Melbourne	team
Gold medal – first place	1988 Auckland	triples
Gold medal – first place	1988 Auckland	fours
Silver medal – second place	1988 Auckland	team
Commonwealth Games
Gold medal – first place	1990 Auckland	fours
Asia Pacific Bowls Championships
Bronze medal – third place	1989 Suva	pairs
Silver medal – second place	1989 Suva	fours
Gold medal – first place	1993 Victoria	triples

Dorothy Edna Roche OAM (1928 – 11 November 2021) was an international lawn bowls competitor for Australia.

== Bowls career ==
Roche took up the sport of bowls in 1975. She won the triples gold medal and fours silver medal at the 1985 World Outdoor Bowls Championship in Melbourne, Australia. Three years later, she won double gold after winning both the triples and fours at the 1988 World Outdoor Bowls Championship in Auckland.

Roche became Australia's oldest Commonwealth Games gold medal winner when she won the women's fours at the 1990 Commonwealth Games in Auckland, at 61 years old.

She won three medals at the Asia Pacific Bowls Championships including a gold medal in the 1993 triples in Victoria, Canada.

Roche was awarded the Order of Australia for services to bowls in 1990.
