= Manuia Porter =

Samoan lawn bowler

Personal information
- Nationality: Samoan
- Born: 9 May 1948 (age 78)
Medal record
Representing (Samoa)
Asia Pacific Bowls Championships
Bronze medal – third place	2007 Christchurch	pairs

Manuia Porter (born 1948) is a former Samoan international lawn bowler.

== Bowls career ==
Porter has represented Samoa at two Commonwealth Games; at the 2002 Commonwealth Games and the 2006 Commonwealth Games.

She won a bronze medal at the 2007 Asia Pacific Bowls Championships.
