= Nathan Rice =

Australian lawn bowler

Personal information
- Nationality: Australian
- Born: 7 June 1979 (age 47) Launceston, Tasmania, Australia

Sport
- Sport: Lawn bowls
- Club: Club Helensvale
Medal record
Representing Australia
Men's lawn bowls
World Outdoor Championships
Bronze medal – third place	2008 Christchurch	pairs
Silver medal – second place	2008 Christchurch	fours
Silver medal – second place	2008 Christchurch	team
Commonwealth Games
Bronze medal – third place	2006 Melbourne	pairs
Bronze medal – third place	2014 Glasgow	fours
Silver medal – second place	2018 Gold Coast	triples
Silver medal – second place	2018 Gold Coast	fours
Asia Pacific Bowls Championships
Bronze medal – third place	2007 Christchurch	singles
Gold medal – first place	2007 Christchurch	pairs
Silver medal – second place	2011 Adelaide	triples
Gold medal – first place	2011 Adelaide	fours
Bronze medal – third place	2015 Christchurch	pairs
Silver medal – second place	2015 Christchurch	fours
Gold medal – first place	2019 Gold Coast	fours
Silver medal – second place	2019 Gold Coast	pairs

Nathan Rex Rice (born 7 June 1979) is a male former Australian international lawn bowler.

== Bowls career ==
=== World Championship ===
Rice won two medals at the 2008 World Outdoor Bowls Championship in Christchurch, New Zealand; a pairs bronze medal with Aron Sherriff and silver medal in the fours.

=== Commonwealth Games ===
He competed in the 2006 Melbourne where he won a men's pairs bronze medal with Barrie Lester in Melbourne. Eight years later he won another bronze in the men's fours at the 2014 Commonwealth Games.

He was part of the Australian team for the 2018 Commonwealth Games on the Gold Coast in Queensland where he took a silver medal in the Triples and another silver in the Fours.

=== Asia Pacific ===
Rice has won eight medals at the Asia Pacific Bowls Championships. The seventh and eighth medals came in the 2019 Asia Pacific Bowls Championships in the Gold Coast, Queensland.

He announced his international retirement in 2019.
