= Marina Khan (bowls) =

New Zealand lawn bowler

Personal information
- Nationality: New Zealander
- Born: 13 December 1965 (age 60)

Sport
- Sport: Bowls
- Club: Matamata BC
Medal record
Representing New Zealand
Commonwealth Games
Bronze medal – third place	2006 Melbourne	Pairs
World Outdoor Championships
Bronze medal – third place	2008 Christchurch	triples
Silver medal – second place	2008 Christchurch	team
Asia Pacific Bowls Championships
Gold medal – first place	2007 Christchurch	fours
Silver medal – second place	2007 Christchurch	triples

Marina Josephine Khan (born 13 December 1965 in Te Puke, New Zealand) is a lawn bowls competitor for New Zealand.

== Personal life ==
She is of Pakistani descent through her father, and of Yugoslav and Maori descent through her mother. Both she and her sister Jan Khan are the daughters of lawn bowler Millie Khan.

== Bowls career ==
At the 2006 Commonwealth Games she won a bronze medal in the women's pairs event with her sister Jan Khan.

She won the fours gold medal and triples silver medal at the 2007 Asia Pacific Bowls Championships in Christchurch.

Marina won the 2000 pairs title and the 2001 & 2002 fours title at the New Zealand National Bowls Championships when bowling for the Matamata Bowls Club.
