= Debbie Wilford =

Norfolk Island lawn bowler

Personal information
- Nationality: Norfolk Islander
- Born: 28 November 1961 (age 64)
Medal record
Representing (Norfolk Island)
Asia Pacific Bowls Championships
Bronze medal – third place	2007 Christchurch	pairs
Silver medal – second place	2009 Kuala Lumpur	pairs

Deborah Ann Wilford (born 1961) is a New Zealand born, Norfolk Islands international lawn bowler.

== Bowls career ==
Wilford has represented the Norfolk Islands at the Commonwealth Games, in the pairs at the 2006 Commonwealth Games.

She won two medals at the Asia Pacific Bowls Championships.
