= Jan Khan =

New Zealand lawn bowler

Personal information
- Nationality: New Zealander
- Born: 25 April 1958 (age 68)

Sport
- Sport: Bowls
- Club: Beckenham BC
Medal record
Representing New Zealand
World Outdoor Championships
Gold medal – first place	2000 Moama	Women's fours
Bronze medal – third place	2008 Christchurch	Women's triples
Silver medal – second place	2008 Christchurch	Women's team
Silver medal – second place	2012 Adelaide	Women's triples
Silver medal – second place	2012 Adelaide	Women's team
Commonwealth Games
Bronze medal – third place	2002 Manchester	Women's fours
Bronze medal – third place	2006 Melbourne	Women's pairs
Asia Pacific Bowls Championships
Gold medal – first place	1999 Kuala Lumpur	fours
Gold medal – first place	2007 Christchurch	fours
Bronze medal – third place	2007 Christchurch	triples
Gold medal – first place	2011 Adelaide	fours
Bronze medal – third place	2011 Adelaide	triples

Jan Maraea Khan (born 25 April 1958 in Rotorua, New Zealand) is an international lawn bowls competitor for New Zealand.

== Personal life ==
Jan is of Pakistani descent through her father, and of Yugoslav and Ngāti Rangitihi descent through her mother. Both she and her sister Marina Khan are the daughters of lawn bowler Millie Khan.

== Bowls career ==
At the 2002 Commonwealth Games, she won a bronze medal in the women's fours event. At the 2006 Commonwealth Games she again won a bronze in the women's pairs event with her sister Marina Khan.

She has won five medals at the Asia Pacific Bowls Championships, of which three have been gold medals.

Khan won the 2010 singles title and the 1997, 2000 & 2001 fours title at the New Zealand National Bowls Championships when bowling for the Beckenham Bowls Club.
