= Porea Elisa =

Cook Islander lawn bowler

Personal information
- Nationality: Cook Islander
- Born: 14 July 1955 (age 70)

Sport
- Sport: Lawn bowls
Medal record
Representing Cook Islands
Asia Pacific Bowls Championships
Bronze medal – third place	1995 Dunedin	triples
Bronze medal – third place	2007 Christchurch	singles
Bronze medal – third place	2007 Christchurch	triples

Porea Elisa (born 1955) is an international lawn bowler from the Cook Islands.

== Bowls career ==
Elisa won the bronze medal in the triples at the 1995 Asia Pacific Bowls Championships in Dunedin. Twelve years later she won double bronze in the singles and triples at the Asia Pacific Championships in Christchurch.

She was selected to represent the Cook Islands at the 2006 Commonwealth Games and 2010 Commonwealth Games.
