= 1988 World Outdoor Bowls Championship =

Lawn bowls competition

World Outdoor Championships 1988
- 6th World Outdoor Bowls Championships
- Location: Auckland, New Zealand
- Date(s): 30 January - 14 February 1988 (Men's); 20 November - 02 December, 1988 (Women's)
- Category: World Bowls Championship

The 1988 Men's World Outdoor Bowls Championship was held in Henderson, Auckland, New Zealand, from 30 January to 14 February 1988.

David Bryant won a third singles Gold defeating Willie Wood in the final. New Zealand won the Pairs and Triples, Ireland won the Fours. The Leonard Trophy went to England.

The 1988 Women's World Outdoor Bowls Championship was held at the same venue but ten months later. Janet Ackland claimed the Women's singles, Ireland won the pairs, Australia scooped the triples and fours but England won the Taylor Trophy.

== Medallists ==
Event	Gold	Silver	Bronze
Men's singles	(England); David Bryant	(Scotland); Willie Wood	(Zimbabwe); Garin Beare
Men's pairs	(New Zealand); Rowan Brassey; Peter Belliss	(England); David Bryant; Tony Allcock	(Wales); Robert Weale; Will Thomas
Men's triples	(New Zealand); Ian Dickison; Morgan Moffat; Phil Skoglund	(Scotland); Willie Paul; Willie Wood; Alex McIntosh	(England); John Ottaway; Wynne Richards; John Bell
Men's fours	Rodney McCutcheon; John McCloughlin; Sammy Allen; Jim Baker	(New Zealand); Rowan Brassey; Ian Dickison; Morgan Moffat; Phil Skoglund	(England); John Ottaway; Wynne Richards; John Bell; Tony Allcock
Men's team	England	New Zealand	Scotland
Women's singles	(Wales); Janet Ackland	Margaret Johnston	(New Zealand); Millie Khan
Women's pairs	Phillis Nolan; Margaret Johnston	(Botswana); Heather Roberts; June Fulton	(England); Wendy Line; Mary Price
Women's triples	(Australia); Marion Stevens; Greeta Fahey; Dorothy Roche	(England); Norma Shaw; Jayne Roylance; Barbara Fuller	(Hong Kong); Naty Rozario; Rae O'Donnell; Sandra Zakoske
Women's fours	(Australia); Norma Wainwright; Marion Stevens; Greeta Fahey; Dorothy Roche	(England); Norma Shaw; Jayne Roylance; Mary Price; Barbara Fuller	(Wales); Margaret Pomeroy; Mary Hughes; Pam Griffiths; Linda Parker
Women's team	England	Australia	Ireland

== Results ==
=== Men's 'DB Draught' singles – round robin ===
Section A

Pos	Player	P	W	L	F	A	Pts
1	(England) David Bryant	11	11	0	275	152	11
2	(Zimbabwe) Garin Beare	11	8	3	257	197	8
3	Stan Espie	11	8	3	252	199	8
4	(Hong Kong) George Souza Jr.	11	8	3	244	201	8
5	(New Zealand) Peter Belliss	11	7	4	246	171	7
6	(Papua New Guinea) Malcolm Stewart	11	5	6	216	214	5
7	(Zambia) Andy Taylor	11	5	6	211	241	5
8	(Malawi) Peter Jeens	11	4	7	221	238	4
9	(United States) Neil McInnes	11	4	7	221	238	4
10	(Jersey) David Le Marquand	11	3	8	217	245	3
11	(Samoa) Tolovaa Tuitolovaa	11	3	8	203	258	3
12	(Japan) Jimmy Ueyama	11	0	11	66	275	0

Section B

Pos	Player	P	W	L	F	A	Pts
1	(Scotland) Willie Wood	10	8	2	242	157	8
2	(Australia) Kenny Williams	10	7	3	237	158	7
3	(Wales) Robert Weale	10	6	4	222	172	6
4	(Canada) Alf Wallace	10	6	4	218	202	6
5	(Israel) Cecil Bransky	10	6	4	215	200	6
6	(Guernsey) Mike Nicolle	10	5	5	198	200	5
7	(Argentina) Jose Riveros	10	4	6	215	227	4
8	(Eswatini) Bob Elliott	10	4	6	178	211	4
9	(Botswana) Mel David	10	4	6	184	226	4
10	(Fiji) Peter Fong	10	3	7	167	231	3
11	(Kenya) Brian Jennings	10	1	9	152	244	1

Bronze medal match

Beare beat Williams 25–22.

Gold medal match

Bryant beat Wood 25–22.

=== Men's 'Budget Rent-a-Car' pairs – round robin ===
Section A

Pos	Player	P	W	D	L	F	A	Pts
1	(New Zealand) Rowan Brassey & Peter Belliss	11	11	0	0	305	169	22
2	(Wales) Robert Weale & Will Thomas	11	8	1	2	285	165	17
3	(Scotland) Grant Knox & George Adrain	11	8	0	3	264	185	16
4	(Papua New Guinea) Brian Boze & Malcolm Stewart	11	7	1	3	255	212	15
5	(Hong Kong) Mark McMahon & George Souza Jr.	11	7	0	4	275	176	14
6	(Australia) Bill Wain & Dennis Katunarich	11	6	0	5	260	156	12
7	(Botswana) Ray Mascarenhas & Johnny Kakakis	11	5	2	4	216	236	12
8	(Eswatini) George Hatzin & Bob Elliott	11	5	0	6	211	223	10
9	(United States) Bert MacWilliams & Joe Shepard	11	3	1	7	210	227	7
10	(Argentina) Linke Bausili & Jose Riveros	11	2	0	9	182	258	4
11	(Malawi) Peter Jeens & Bill Haining	11	1	1	9	201	263	3
12	(Japan) Saburo Kasuya & Jimmy Ueyama	11	0	0	11	102	495	0

Section B

Pos	Player	P	W	D	L	F	A	Pts
1	(England) David Bryant & Tony Allcock	10	9	0	1	261	152	18
2	(Canada) Ronnie Jones & Bill Boettger	10	7	1	2	225	182	15
3	(Israel) Gordon Seef & Cecil Bransky	10	7	0	3	229	161	14
4	(Fiji) Caucau Turagabeci & Peter Fong	10	7	0	3	218	178	14
5	Rodney McCutcheon & John McCloughlin	10	6	1	3	211	192	13
6	(Zimbabwe) Ken Redman & Garin Beare	10	5	0	5	185	203	10
7	(Samoa) Fiu Asi & Tolovaa Tuitolovaa	10	3	1	6	188	211	7
8	(Jersey) David Le Marquand & Ken Lowery	10	3	0	7	200	210	6
9	(Zambia) Andy Taylor & Duncan Naysmith	10	3	0	7	186	223	6
10	(Guernsey) Mike Smith & Mike Nicolle	10	2	0	8	157	242	4
11	(Kenya) Dave Bramley & Brian Jennings	10	1	1	8	143	269	3

Bronze medal match

Wales beat Canada 24–13.

Gold medal match

New Zealand beat England 18–16.

=== Men's 'Mitsubishi Mirage' triples – round robin ===
Section A

Pos	Player	P	W	D	L	F	A	Pts
1	(New Zealand) Ian Dickison, Morgan Moffat, Phil Skoglund	11	9	1	1	245	118	19
2	(England) John Ottaway, Wynne Richards, John Bell	11	9	0	2	252	141	18
3	(Australia) Kenny Williams, Trevor Morris, Darby Ross	11	8	1	2	249	153	17
4	(United States) Frank Souza, Skippy Arculli, Neil McInnes	11	8	0	3	189	155	16
5	Stan Espie, Sammy Allen, Jim Baker	11	7	0	4	208	148	14
6	(Fiji) Ram Shankar, Wilfred Stephens, Emi Cavuduadua	11	7	0	4	201	179	14
7	(Wales) Dave Vowles, Alun Thomas, Jim Morgan	11	4	2	5	198	169	10
8	(Samoa) Taitu’uga Rokeni, Taua Faasoo, Fetalaiga Kirisome	11	3	2	6	168	203	8
9	(Canada) Alf Wallace, David Brown, Dave Duncalf	11	3	0	8	164	198	6
10	(Malawi) Piet van Leeuwen, Dave Broad, John Chalmers	11	3	0	8	164	217	6
11	(Guernsey) Bill Crawford, Mike Pike, Bernie Simon	11	2	0	9	149	241	4
12	(Japan) Hideko Kugo, Kemichi Hashi, Larry Yamaya	11	0	0	11	81	346	0

Section B

Pos	Player	P	W	D	L	F	A	Pts
1	(Scotland) Willie Paul, Willie Wood, Alex McIntosh	10	8	0	2	215	146	16
2	(Papua New Guinea) Philip Rei, Derek Penny, Tau Nancie	10	6	1	3	207	153	13
3	(Jersey) Brian Attwood, Paul James, Tim Mallett	10	6	1	3	193	162	13
4	(Zambia) Japie Van Deventer, Corrie Krige, Tom Powell	10	6	0	4	203	179	12
5	(Zimbabwe) Richie Hayden, Bill Cumming, Paul Kramer	10	6	0	4	174	167	12
6	(Israel) Joe Goldberg, Cecil Cooper, Sam Skudowitz	10	5	1	4	197	150	11
7	(Hong Kong) Noel Kennedy, Danny Ho, David Tso	10	5	1	4	209	169	11
8	(Eswatini) Hayley Abrahams, Derek James, Dave Thompson	10	5	0	5	159	183	10
9	(Botswana) Mel David, John Baylis, John Thackray	10	3	1	6	164	204	7
10	(Kenya) Richard Dugdale, Oliver Fowler, John Bone	10	1	1	8	134	217	3
11	(Argentina) Richardo Cantarini, Julian Dannevig, Enri Merli	10	1	0	9	116	241	2

Bronze medal match

England beat Papua New Guinea 19–14.

Gold medal match

New Zealand beat Scotland 18–15.

=== Men's 'Tellus' fours – round robin ===
Section A

Pos	Player	P	W	D	L	F	A	Pts
1	Rodney McCutcheon, John McCloughlin, Sammy Allen, Jim Baker	11	10	1	0	280	145	21
2	(England) John Ottaway, Wynne Richards, John Bell, Tony Allcock	11	9	1	1	351	145	19
3	(Scotland) Willie Paul, Grant Knox, George Adrain, Alex McIntosh	11	9	0	2	279	182	18
4	(Botswana) Ray Mascarenhas, Johnny Kakakis, John Baylis, John Thackray	11	6	0	5	231	214	12
5	(Israel) Gordon Seef, Joe Goldberg, Cecil Cooper, Sam Skudowitz	11	6	0	5	220	212	12
6	(Zambia) Japie Van Deventer, Corrie Krige, Tom Powell, Duncan Naysmith	11	6	0	5	223	217	12
7	(Canada) David Brown, Ronnie Jones, Bill Boettger, Dave Duncalf	11	6	0	5	219	214	12
8	(Guernsey) Mike Smith, Bill Crawford, Mike Pike, Bernie Simon	11	6	0	5	228	223	12
9	(Jersey) Brian Attwood, Paul James, Ken Lowery, Tim Mallett	11	3	0	8	209	255	6
10	(Samoa) Taitu’uga Rokeni, Fiu Asi, Taua Faasoo, Fetalaiga Kirisome	11	2	0	9	184	249	4
11	(Argentina) Richardo Cantarini, Julian Dannevig, Clemente Bausili, Enrii Merli	11	2	0	9	178	283	4
12	(Japan) Saburo Kasuya, Hideko Kugo, Kemichi Hashi, Larry Yamaya	11	0	0	11	105	368	0

Section B

Pos	Player	P	W	D	L	F	A	Pts
1	(New Zealand) Rowan Brassey, Ian Dickison, Morgan Moffat, Phil Skoglund	10	9	0	1	248	146	18
2	(Wales) Dave Vowles, Alun Thomas, Jim Morgan, Will Thomas	10	8	0	2	247	149	16
3	(Australia) Bill Wain, Dennis Katunarich, Trevor Morris, Darby Ross	10	8	0	2	245	157	16
4	(Hong Kong) Noel Kennedy, Mark McMahon, Danny Ho, David Tso	10	6	1	3	225	172	13
5	(Fiji) Ram Shankar, Wilfred Stephens, Caucau Turagabeci, Emi Cavuduadua	10	5	1	4	200	164	11
6	(Zimbabwe) Richie Hayden, Ken Redman, Bill Cumming, Paul Kramer	10	5	1	4	204	190	11
7	(Papua New Guinea) Philip Rei, Derek Penny, Brian Boze, Tau Nancie	10	4	1	5	194	190	9
8	(Eswatini) George Hatzin, Hayley Abrahams, Derek James, Dave Thompson	10	3	0	7	162	263	6
9	(United States) Frank Souza, Bert MacWilliams, Skippy Arculli, Joe Shepard	10	2	0	8	160	242	4
10	(Malawi) Bill Haining, Piet van Leeuwen, Dave Broad, John Chalmers	10	1	1	8	143	245	3
11	(Kenya) Richard Dugdale, Dave Bramley, Oliver Fowler, John Bone	10	1	1	8	166	275	3

Bronze medal match

England beat Wales 21–18.

Gold medal match

Ireland beat New Zealand 26–15.

=== W.M.Leonard Trophy ===
Pos	Team	Singles	Pairs	Triples	Fours	Total
1	England	23	22	21	21	87
2	New Zealand	15	23	23	22	83
3	Scotland	22	19	22	18	81
4	Australia	20	13	19	19	71
5	Wales	19	20	10	20	69
6	Ireland	18	14	14	23	69
7	Zimbabwe	21	11	15	13	60
8	Hong Kong	16	15	11	17	59
9	Papua New Guinea	12	16	20	10	58
10	Israel	14	18	12	14	58
11	Canada	17	21	6	11	55
12	Fiji	4	17	13	15	49
13	Zambia	11	6	16	12	45
14	Botswana	6	11	7	16	40
15	Jersey	5	9	18	7	39
16	United States	7	7	17	6	37
17	(Eswatini) Swaziland	9	8	9	8	34
18	Guernsey	13	5	3	9	30
19	Western Samoa	2	10	8	5	25
20	Malawi	8	2	5	4	19
21	Argentina	10	4	2	2	18
22	Kenya	3	3	4	3	13
23	Japan	1	1	1	1	4

=== Women's 'Thomas Cook' Singles – round robin ===
Section A

Pos	Player	P	W	L	F	A	Pts
1	(Wales) Janet Ackland	11	9	2	230	168	9
2	(New Zealand) Millie Khan	11	8	3	219	168	8
3	(Scotland) Senga McCrone	11	8	3	223	182	8
4	(Australia) Merle Richardson	11	7	4	227	161	7
5	(Singapore) Ayres Soh	11	7	4	208	190	7
6	(Canada) Dorothy Macey	11	6	5	200	184	6
7	(Norfolk Island) Novi Browning	11	5	6	205	197	5
8	(Zimbabwe) Lorna Gordon	11	5	6	203	186	5
9	(Zambia) Helen Graham	11	5	6	196	197	5
10	(Samoa) Vaifou Pula Faraimo	11	4	7	170	196	4
11	(United States) Joyce Schindler	11	1	10	128	229	1
12	(Kenya) Jean Haggerty	11	0	11	88	239	0

Section B

Pos	Player	P	W	L	F	A	Pts
1	Margaret Johnston	10	8	2	209	169	8
2	(Fiji) Maraia Lum On	10	7	3	197	149	7
3	(Cook Islands) Rebecca Akaruru	10	6	4	186	186	6
4	(England) Wendy Line	10	5	5	195	172	5
5	(Jersey) Sheila Syvret	10	5	5	189	181	5
6	(Botswana) Babs Anderson	10	5	5	180	171	5
7	(Hong Kong) Joan Humphreys	10	5	5	174	191	5
8	(Papua New Guinea) Geua Vada Tau	10	4	6	188	178	4
9	(Guernsey) Fleur Bougourd	10	4	6	186	193	4
10	(Israel) Miriam Jankelowitz	10	3	7	161	203	3
11	(Argentina) Maria Gismondi	10	3	7	143	209	3

Bronze medal match

Khan beat Lum On 25–24.

Gold medal match

Ackland beat Johnston 25–20.

=== Women's pairs – round robin ===
Section A

Pos	Player	P	W	D	L	F	A	Pts
1	Phillis Nolan & Margaret Johnston	11	10	0	1	264	163	20
2	(England) Wendy Line & Mary Price	11	9	0	2	286	147	18
3	(Australia) Norma Wainwright & Merle Richardson	11	9	0	2	279	168	18
4	(Hong Kong) Joan Humphreys & Rosemary McMahon	11	7	0	4	243	205	14
5	(Jersey) Mavis Le Marquand & Jean Lowery	11	5	0	6	198	209	10
6	(United States) Jo Gilbert & Joyce Schindler	11	5	0	6	168	276	10
7	(Norfolk Island) Carmen Bishop & Novi Browning	11	4	0	7	190	221	8
8	(Canada) Dorothy Macey & Elaine Jones	11	4	0	7	189	229	8
9	(Israel) Lorraine Rabman & Miriam Jankelowitz	11	4	0	7	201	246	8
10	(Zambia) Ann Meir & Helen Graham	11	3	0	8	195	227	6
11	(Samoa) Faleseu Fua & Faleao Letoa	11	3	0	8	183	238	6
12	(Singapore) Ayres Soh & Rita Pereira	11	3	0	8	164	229	6

Section B

Pos	Player	P	W	D	L	F	A	Pts
1	(Botswana) Heather Roberts & June Fulton	10	9	0	1	224	164	18
2	(New Zealand) Judy Howat & Millie Khan	10	7	0	3	242	166	14
3	(Fiji) Maraia Lum On & Willow Fong	10	7	0	3	219	185	14
4	(Scotland) Sarah Gourlay & Frances Whyte	10	6	1	3	238	170	13
5	(Zimbabwe) Margaret Mills & Onei Dolphin	10	6	1	3	223	186	13
6	(Papua New Guinea) Geua Vada Tau & Laureen Griffiths	10	5	0	5	208	174	10
7	(Cook Islands) Teina Jay & Rebecca Akaruru	10	5	0	5	214	182	10
8	(Wales) Pam Griffiths & Margaret Pomeroy	10	4	0	6	182	213	8
9	(Guernsey) Pamela Le Tissier & Fleur Bougourd	10	4	0	6	174	216	8
10	(Kenya) Daphne Christie & Jean Haggerty	10	1	0	9	135	262	2
11	(Argentina) Dora de Jahn & Maria Gismondi	10	0	0	10	138	266	0

Bronze medal match

England beat New Zealand 20–15.

Gold medal match

Ireland beat Botswana 22–13.

=== Women's triples – round robin ===
Section A

Pos	Player	P	W	D	L	F	A	Pts
1	(Australia) Marion Stevens, Greeta Fahey & Dorothy Roche	10	7	1	2	214	157	15
2	(Scotland) Nan Mulholland, Senga McCrone & Annette Evans	10	7	1	2	181	139	15
3	(Wales) Janet Ackland, Mary Hughes & Linda Parker	10	7	0	3	192	165	14
4	(Fiji) Maxine Bentley, Janki Gaunder & Wimla Swamy	10	5	1	4	182	144	11
5	(Zambia) Ellie Maloney, Kathy Letherby & May Morrison	10	5	0	5	188	157	10
6	(Canada) Marlene Cleutrix, Rosina Toal & Alice Duncalf	10	5	0	5	177	159	10
7	Freda Elliott, Eileen Bell & Nan Allely	10	5	0	5	179	173	10
8	(Papua New Guinea) Geita Gabi, Mary Nancie & Olive Babaga	10	5	0	5	168	189	10
9	(Samoa) Laufili Ainuu, Fa’aniniva Pua Paulo & Vaifou Pula Faraimo	10	3	2	5	160	189	8
10	(Guernsey) Anne Simon, Hilda White & Jennifer Nicolle	10	2	1	7	134	185	5
11	(Singapore) Mary Low, Pam Koopal & Mary Ware	10	1	0	9	123	235	2

Section B

Pos	Player	P	W	D	L	F	A	Pts
1	(England) Norma Shaw, Jayne Roylance & Barbara Fuller	10	10	0	0	199	146	20
2	(Hong Kong) Naty Rozario, Rae O'Donnell & Sandra Zakoske	10	6	1	3	197	138	13
3	(Zimbabwe) Lorna Gordon, Sheila West & Eileen Jones	10	6	1	3	191	141	13
4	(New Zealand) Margaret Cole, Pearl Dymond & Jean Ryan	10	5	1	4	178	150	12
5	(Israel) Bessie Rosenburg, Tessa Futerman & Molly Skudowitz	10	5	1	4	160	149	11
6	(United States) Barbara Jones, Edith Denton & Ruby Woodcock	10	5	0	5	201	178	10
7	(Argentina) Angela de Abella, Graciela Edwards & Beatriz Bausili	10	4	0	6	157	186	8
8	(Kenya) Myra Layfield, Maureen Dougherty & Wendy Bone	10	4	0	6	152	189	8
9	(Norfolk Island) Beverley Herman, Beatrice Karl & Pauline Turton	10	3	0	7	147	198	6
10	(Botswana) Babs Anderson, Eve Thomas & Shirley Baylis	10	2	1	7	164	194	5
11	(Cook Islands) Ngamarama Ben, Tereapii Urlich & Agnes Winchester	10	2	0	8	127	206	4

Bronze medal match

Hong Kong beat Scotland 18–9.

Gold medal match

Australia beat England 22–13.

=== Women's 'Bell Tea' fours – round robin ===
Section A

Pos	Player	P	W	D	L	F	A	Pts
1	(England) Norma Shaw, Jayne Roylance, Mary Price & Barbara Fuller	10	9	0	1	205	114	18
2	Freda Elliott, Eileen Bell, Nan Allely & Phillis Nolan	10	8	0	2	172	145	16
3	(Hong Kong) Naty Rozario, Rae O'Donnell, Sandra Zakoske & Rosemary McMahon	10	7	0	3	173	120	14
4	(Scotland) Nan Mulholland, Sarah Gourlay, Annette Evans & Frances Whyte	10	6	0	4	167	161	12
5	(Samoa) Faleseu Fua, Faleao Letoa, Laufili Ainuu, & Fa’aniniva Pua Paulo	10	5	0	5	161	137	10
6	(Canada) Marlene Cleutrix, Elaine Jones, Rosina Toal & Alice Duncalf	10	5	0	5	141	159	10
7	(Israel) Lorraine Rabman, Bessie Rosenburg, Tessa Futerman & Molly Skudowitz	10	4	0	6	146	158	8
8	(Singapore) Mary Low, Pam Koopal, Rita Pereira & Mary Ware	10	4	0	6	141	172	8
9	(United States) Jo Gilbert, Barbara Jones, Edith Denton & Ruby Woodcock	10	3	0	7	123	172	6
10	(Argentina) Dora de Jahn, Angela de Abella, Graciela Edwards & Beatriz Bausili	10	2	8	9	127	164	4
11	(Kenya) Myra Layfield, Maureen Dougherty, Wendy Bone & Daphne Christie	10	2	0	8	123	172	4

Section B

Pos	Player	P	W	D	L	F	A	Pts
1	(Australia) Norma Wainwright, Marion Stevens, Greeta Fahey & Dorothy Roche	10	8	0	2	168	124	16
2	(Wales) Margaret Pomeroy, Mary Hughes, Pam Griffiths & Linda Parker	10	6	1	3	162	129	13
3	(Zimbabwe) Margaret Mills, Onei Dolphin, Sheila West & Eileen Jones	10	6	0	4	156	130	12
4	(Papua New Guinea) Geita Gabi, Mary Nancie, Laureen Griffiths & Olive Babaga	10	4	3	3	166	153	11
5	(Cook Islands) Ngamarama Ben, Teina Jay, Tereapii Urlich & Agnes Winchester	10	5	0	5	147	140	10
6	(New Zealand) Margaret Cole, Judy Howat, Pearl Dymond & Jean Ryan	10	4	2	4	149	170	10
7	(Botswana) Heather Roberts, Eve Thomas, Shirley Baylis & Jane Fulton	10	4	1	5	142	121	9
8	(Guernsey) Anne Simon, Hilda White, Pamela Le Tissier & Jennifer Nicolle	10	4	0	6	141	161	8
9	(Zambia) Ann Meir, Ellie Maloney, Kathy Letherby & May Morrison	10	3	2	5	122	143	8
10	(Norfolk Island) Beverley Herman, Carmen Bishop, Beatrice Karl & Pauline Turton	10	3	0	7	130	183	6
11	(Fiji) Maxine Bentley, Janki Gaunder, Wimla Swamy & Willow Fong	10	2	1	7	130	159	5

Bronze medal match

Wales beat Ireland 22–18.

Gold medal match

Australia beat England 20–19.

=== Taylor Trophy ===
Pos	Player	Singles	Pairs	Triples	Fours	Total
1	England	17	21	21	21	80
2	Australia	16	19	22	22	79
3	Ireland	22	23	10	19	74
4	Wales	23	9	18	20	70
5	New Zealand	21	20	16	12	69
6	Scotland	19	17	19	15	65
7	Hong Kong	11	16	20	17	64
8	Zimbabwe	8	15	17	18	58
9	Fiji	20	18	15	2	55
10	Botswana	12	22	4	9	47
11	Papua New Guinea	9	13	8	16	46
12	Canada	13	8	12	11	44
13	Cook Islands	18	11	1	13	43
14	Israel	5	6	13	10	34
15	Zambia	7	5	14	6	32
16	United States	3	12	11	5	31
17	Norfolk Island	10	10	6	4	30
18	Jersey	15	14	0	0	29
19	Western Samoa	4	3	5	14	26
20	Singapore	14	1	2	7	24
21	Guernsey	6	7	3	8	24
22	Argentina	2	2	9	3	16
23	Kenya	1	4	7	1	13
