= Lawn bowls at the Pacific Games =

Lawn bowls at the Pacific Games (known as the South Pacific Games until 2009) was introduced as a tournament for men's and women in 1979 at the 1979 South Pacific Games.

== Past winners ==
There have been six editions of lawn bowls at the Games.

=== Men's titles ===
Year	Venue	Singles	Pairs	Triples	Fours
1979	Suva, Fiji	(Papua New Guinea); Thomas Menton	(Cook Islands); Teanua Kamana; Tupui Henry	(Fiji); Peter Fong; Ram Harakh; Shaun Patton	(Fiji); Peter Fong; Ram Harakh; Shaun Patton; Kevin Perry
1983	Apia, Samoa				
1991	Port Moresby, PNG	(Fiji); Caucau Turagabeci	(Papua New Guinea); Martin Seeto; Tau Nancie	(Papua New Guinea); Babaga; Mugu; McKinnar	(Papua New Guinea); Martin Seeto; Babaga; Mugu; Tau Nancie
2003	Suva, Fiji	(Fiji)	(Fiji)	(Fiji)	(Fiji)
2007	Apia, Samoa	(Samoa); Valovale Pritchard	(Papua New Guinea); Peter Juni; Pomat Topal	(Tokelau); Lotomalie Fakaalofa; Sagato Alefosio; Sakaraia Patelesio	(Fiji); Arun Kumar; Semesa Naiseruvati; Rajnish Lal; Sushil Sharma
2015	Port Moresby, PNG	(Fiji); David Aitcheson	(Norfolk Island); Phillip Jones; Gary Bigg	(Fiji); Arun Kumar; David Aitcheson; Rajnesh Kumar	(Cook Islands); Peter Totoo; Phillip Tangi; Joseph Akaruru; Ioane Inatou
2019	Apia, Samoa	(Fiji); Semesa Naiseruvati	(Samoa); Lealaiauloto Tiatia; Tupai Avala Savaaiinaea	(Fiji); Abdul Kalim; Kushal Pillay; Semesa Naiseruvati	(Cook Islands); Aidan Zittersteijn; Taiki Paniani; Royden Aperau; Lawrence Paniani

=== Women's titles ===
Year	Venue	Singles	Pairs	Triples	Fours
1979	Suva, Fiji	(Fiji); Maraia Lum On	(Fiji); Maraia Lum On; Willow Fong	(Samoa); Josephine Hunt; Lemafoe Lagaala-Porter; Pula Laufili V. Faraimo	(Papua New Guinea); Piri Kennedy; Maggie Worri; Rose Kambul; Betty Glassey
1983	Apia, Samoa		(Fiji)		
1991	Port Moresby, PNG	(Fiji); Maraia Lum On	(Papua New Guinea); Geua Vada Tau; Linda Ahmat	(Papua New Guinea); Aun; Bray; Elizabeth Bure	(Papua New Guinea); Aun; Bray; Elizabeth Bure; Linda Ahmat
2003	Suva, Fiji	(Fiji); Litia Tikoisuva	(Samoa)	(Cook Islands)	(Fiji)
2007	Apia, Samoa	(Tokelau); Violina Linda Pedro	(Tokelau); Violina Linda Pedro; Opetera Samakia Ngatoko	(Cook Islands); Kanny Vaile; Mourauri Tokorangi; Irene Tupuna	(Cook Islands); Martina Akaruru; Kanny Vaile; Mourauri Tokorangi; Irene Tupuna
2015	Port Moresby, PNG	(Cook Islands); Teokotai Rahui Jim	(Papua New Guinea); Cesley Simbinali; Ju Melissa Carlo	(Fiji); Litia Tikoisuva; Sheral Mar; Elizabeth Moceiwai	(Papua New Guinea); Mondin Tiba; Cesley Simbinali; Angela Simbinali; Catherine Wimp
2019	Apia, Samoa	(Fiji); Litia Tikoisuva	(Norfolk Island); Shae Wilson; Petal Jones	(Niue); Josephine Peyroux; Pauline Rex-Blumsky; Christine Ioane	(Norfolk Island); Travey Wora; Tassie Evans; Ann Snell; Petal Jones
