= Lawn bowls at the 1979 South Pacific Games =

- Location: Suva, Fiji
- Dates: 28 August to 8 September 1979

Lawn Bowls at the 1979 South Pacific Games was held from 28 August to 8 September 1979 in Suva, Fiji.

== Men's results ==
Event	Gold	Silver	Bronze
Singles	(Papua New Guinea); Thomas Menton	(Samoa); Fetalaiga Kirisome	(Norfolk Island); Keith Turton
Pairs	(Cook Islands); Teanua Kamana; Tupui Henry	(Samoa); Fetalaiga Kirisome; Falevi Petana	(Norfolk Island); Lyle Hutchinson; Keith Turton
Triples	(Fiji); Peter Fong; Ram Harakh; Sean Patton	(Papua New Guinea); Fred Daniels; Esekia Takaru; Tau Nancie	(Norfolk Island); Bill Adams; Norm Lecren; Dan Yager
Fours	(Fiji); Peter Fong; Ram Harakh; Sean Patton; Kevin Perry	(Norfolk Island); Bill Adams; Lyle Hutchinson; Norm Lecren; Dan Yager	(Papua New Guinea); Albert Barakeina; Fred Daniels; Esekia Takaru; Tau Nancie

== Women's results ==
Event	Gold	Silver	Bronze
Singles	(Fiji); Maraia Lum On	(Papua New Guinea); Margaret Mitchell	(Cook Islands); Ramona Ash
Pairs	(Fiji); Maraia Lum On; Willow Fong	(Papua New Guinea); Piri Kennedy; Margaret Mitchell	(Cook Islands); Tungane Pokoati; Ramona Ash
Triples	(Samoa); Josephine Hunt; Lemafoe Lagaala-Porter; Pula Laufili V. Faraimo	(Papua New Guinea); Maggie Worri; Rose Kambul; Betty Glassey	(Fiji); Chandra Singh; Teresa Hughes; Filo O'Meagher
Fours	(Papua New Guinea); Piri Kennedy; Maggie Worri; Rose Kambul; Betty Glassey	(Cook Islands); Tungane Pokoati; Makiru Hole; Tepaeru Short; Lou Graham	(Fiji); Chandra Singh; Teresa Hughes; Filo O'Meagher; Willow Fong

== See also ==
- Lawn bowls at the Pacific Games
