= Lawn bowls at the 1991 South Pacific Games =

International lawn bowls competition

- Location: Port Moresby and Lae, Papua New Guinea
- Dates: 7–21 September 1991

Lawn bowls at the 1991 South Pacific Games was held from 7 to 21 September 1991 in Port Moresby and Lae, Papua New Guinea.

== Men's results ==
Event	Gold	Silver	Bronze
Singles	(Fiji); Caucau Turagabeci	(Norfolk Island); Kevin Williams	(Cook Islands); P Totoo
Pairs	(Papua New Guinea); Martin Seeto; Tau Nancie	(Fiji); Caucau Turagabeci; Pani Matailevu	(Norfolk Island); Dave Smith; Kevin Williams
Triples	(Papua New Guinea); Babaga; Mugu; McKinnar	(Fiji); Ram Shankar; Peter Thaggard; Singh	(Cook Islands); Rohui; Ieremia Tuteru; Templeton
Fours	(Papua New Guinea); Martin Seeto; Babaga; Mugu; Tau Nancie	(Cook Islands); Rohui; Pilkington; Ieremia Tuteru; Templeton	(Fiji); Pani Matailevu; Ram Shankar; Peter Thaggard; Singh
Team	Papua New Guinea	Fiji	Cook Islands

== Women's results ==
Event	Gold	Silver	Bronze
Singles	(Fiji); Maraia Lum On	(Norfolk Island); Carmen Bishop	(Samoa); Fua Leute
Pairs	(Papua New Guinea); Geua Vada Tau; Linda Ahmat	(Cook Islands); Ramona Ash; Kanny Vaile	(Fiji); Phil Morrison; Maraia Lum On
Triples	(Papua New Guinea); Aun; Bray; Elizabeth Bure	(Samoa); Marie Toalepaiaii; Faamomoi Rokeni; Fua Leute	(Cook Islands); Tuteru; Tremoana Damm; Ben
Fours	(Papua New Guinea); Aun; Bray; Elizabeth Bure; Linda Ahmat	(Fiji); Matailevu; Phil Morrison; Vimla Swamy; Adi Losalini Browne	(Samoa); Marie Toalepaiaii; Faamomoi Rokeni; Lee; Pativaine Ainuu
Team	Papua New Guinea	Fiji	Samoa

== See also ==
- Lawn bowls at the Pacific Games
