= Lawn bowls at the 1986 Commonwealth Games =

- Venue: Balgreen Bowls Club
- Location: Edinburgh, Scotland
- Dates: 24 July – 2 August 1986

Lawn bowls at the 1986 Commonwealth Games was the 12th appearance of the Lawn bowls at the Commonwealth Games. Competition at the 1986 Commonwealth Games took place at the Balgreen Bowls Club in Edinburgh, Scotland, from 24 July until 2 August 1986.

Wales topped the lawn bowls medal table by virtue of winning two gold medals.

== Medal table ==
* Host nation (Scotland)

Rank	Nation	Gold	Silver	Bronze	Total
1	Wales	2	0	0	2
2	Scotland*	1	1	1	3
3	England	1	0	3	4
4	Northern Ireland	1	0	1	2
5	New Zealand	1	0	0	1
6	Australia	0	2	0	2
6	Canada	0	2	0	2
8	Guernsey	0	1	0	1
9	Botswana	0	0	1	1
Totals (9 entries)		6	6	6	18

== Medallists ==
Event	Gold	Silver	Bronze
Men's singles	(New Zealand); Ian Dickison	(Australia); Ian Schuback	(Scotland); Richard Corsie
Men's pairs	(Scotland); Grant Knox; George Adrain	(Canada); Bill Boettger; Ronnie Jones	(England); Chris Ward; David Ward
Men's Fours	(Wales); Hafod Thomas; Jim Morgan; Robert Weale; Will Thomas	(Canada); Dan Milligan; Dave Brown; Dave Houtby; Dave Duncalf	(Northern Ireland); Billie Montgomery; Ernie Parkinson; Roy McCune; Willie Watson
Women's singles	(England); Wendy Line	(Scotland); Senga McCrone	(Botswana); Babs Anderson
Women's pairs	(Northern Ireland); Freda Elliott; Margaret Johnston	(Guernsey); Jenny Nicolle; Marie Smith	(England); Betty Stubbings; Jean Valls
Women's fours	(Wales); Linda Parker; Linda Evans; Joan Ricketts; Rita Jones	(Australia); Audrey Hefford; Betty Schenke; Clarice Power; Patricia Smith	(England); Barbara Fuller; Brenda Atherton; Madge Allan; Mary Price

== Results ==
The Women's pairs and Fours were inaugurated during these Games.

=== Men's singles – round robin ===
Pos	Player	P	W	L	Pts	Shots
1	(New Zealand) Ian Dickison	12	11	1	22	+81
2	(Australia) Ian Schuback	12	9	3	18	+61
3	(Scotland) Richard Corsie	12	9	3	18	+58
4	(Canada) Alf Wallace	12	8	4	16	+28
5	(Fiji) Peter Fong	12	7	5	14	+39
6	(England) Andy Thomson	12	7	5	14	0
7	(Wales) Ray Hill	12	6	6	12	+23
8	(Northern Ireland) Stan Espie	12	6	6	12	+15
9	(Hong Kong) Keith Bosley	12	4	8	8	-51
10	(Jersey) David Le Marquand	12	4	8	8	-60
11	(Botswana) Mel David	12	3	9	6	-48
12	(Guernsey) Mike Smith	12	2	10	4	-69
13	(Malawi) Ray Young	12	2	10	4	-77

=== Men's pairs – round robin ===
Pos	Player	P	W	D	L	Pts	Shots
1	(Scotland) Grant Knox & George Adrain	12	12	0	0	24	+121
2	(Canada) Bill Boettger & Ronnie Jones	12	9	0	3	18	+57
3	(England) Chris Ward & David Ward	12	8	0	4	16	+61
4	(Wales) Lyn Perkins & Spencer Wilshire	12	8	0	4	16	+44
5	(Hong Kong) David Tso & M B Hassan Jr.	12	6	1	6	13	-11
6	(Northern Ireland) Davy Hamilton & Rodney McCutcheon	12	6	0	6	12	+19
7	(New Zealand) Maurice Symes & Wayne Nairn	12	5	1	6	11	+5
8	(Fiji) Caucau Turagabeci & Jagdeo Singh	12	5	0	7	10	-42
9	(Australia) Arthur Black & Kevin Henricks	12	4	0	8	8	-18
10	(Malawi) Bill Haining & David Broad	12	4	0	8	8	-24
11	(Guernsey) Bill Crawford & Mike Nicolle	12	4	0	8	8	-47
12	(Botswana) John Thackray & Ray Mascarenhas	12	3	1	8	7	-71
13	(Jersey) John Jones & Marcel Coutouly	12	2	1	9	5	-94

=== Men's fours - round robin ===
Pos	Player	P	W	D	L	Pts	Shots
1	(Wales) Hafod Thomas, Jim Morgan, Robert Weale, Will Thomas	11	8	1	2	17	+45
2	(Canada) Dan Milligan, Dave Brown, Dave Houtby, Dave Duncalf	11	7	1	3	15	+60
3	(Northern Ireland) Billie Montgomery, Ernie Parkinson, Roy McCune, Willie Watson	11	7	0	4	14	+53
4	(New Zealand) John Murtagh, Keith Slight, Morgan Moffat, Stewart McConnell	11	7	0	4	14	+28
5	(Hong Kong) Danny Ho, George Souza Jr., Mark McMahon, Noel Kennedy	11	6	0	5	12	+38
6	(Scotland) Graham Robertson, Jim Boyle, Malcolm Graham, Willie Harkness	11	6	0	5	12	-9
7	(England) Julian Haines, Len Bowden, Martyn Sekjer, Pip Branfield	11	5	0	6	10	+12
8	(Botswana) Dennis Rose, Dereck Rhodes, James Benson, Johnie Kakakis	11	5	0	6	10	-20
9	(Australia) Bryce Stewart, Michael Hill, Peter Sardelic, Raymond Laycock	11	5	0	6	10	-22
10	(Fiji) Eminoni Cavaduadua, Geoff O'Meagher, Krishna Gaunder, Peter Thaggard	11	4	0	7	8	-52
11	(Eswatini) David Thompson, Hayley Abrahams, John Kemp, Thomas O'Lynn	11	3	0	8	6	-79
12	(Guernsey) Bernard Simon, Bob Murphy, Clarence Blondel, Gary Pitschou	11	2	0	9	4	-54

=== Women's singles – round robin ===
Pos	Player	P	W	L	Pts	Shots
1	(England) Wendy Line	11	9	2	18	+51
2	(Scotland) Senga McCrone	11	9	2	18	+49
3	(Botswana) Babs Anderson	11	7	4	14	+40
4	(Canada) Nell Hunter	11	6	5	12	+32
5	(Australia) Greeta Fahey	11	6	5	12	+11
6	(Fiji) Maraia Lum On	11	6	5	12	+11
7	(Hong Kong) Joan Humphreys	12	6	5	12	0
8	(Northern Ireland) Eileen Bell	11	6	5	12	-13
9	(New Zealand) Rhoda Ryan	11	5	6	10	+15
10	(Wales) Ann Dainton	11	5	6	10	-7
11	(Jersey) Margaret Blattman	11	1	10	2	-81
12	(Guernsey) Pam le Tissier	11	0	10	0	-142

=== Women's pairs – round robin ===
Pos	Player	P	W	D	L	Pts	Shots
1	(Northern Ireland) Freda Elliott & Margaret Johnston	10	9	0	1	18	+97
2	(Guernsey) Jenny Nicolle & Marie Smith	10	7	1	2	15	+25
3	(England) Betty Stubbings & Jean Valls	10	6	0	4	12	+42
4	(Hong Kong) Rosemary McMahon & Sandi Zakoske	10	6	0	4	12	+20
5	(Wales) Janet Ackland & Margaret Pomeroy	10	5	0	5	10	+32
6	(New Zealand) Joyce Osborne & Millie Khan	10	5	0	5	10	+14
7	(Canada) Alice Duncalf & Dorothy Macey	10	5	0	5	10	+9
8	(Scotland) Greta Boyle & Nan Mulholland	10	4	0	6	8	-10
9	(Australia) Beryl Godfrey & Hilda Pochon	10	4	0	6	8	-38
10	(Botswana) Eve Thomas & Margaret Green	10	2	1	7	5	-112
11	(Fiji) Janki Gaunder & Willow Fong	10	1	0	9	2	-79

=== Women's fours - round robin ===
Pos	Player	P	W	D	L	Pts	Shots
1	(Wales) Linda Parker, Linda Evans, Joan Ricketts, Rita Jones	12	10	0	2	20	+73
2	(Australia) Audrey Hefford, Betty Schenke, Clarice Power, Patricia Smith	12	9	0	3	18	+64
3	(England) Barbara Fuller, Brenda Atherton, Madge Allan, Mary Price	12	8	0	4	16	+107
4	(Hong Kong) Helen Wong, Josephine Hollis, Linda King, Rae O'Donnell	12	7	1	4	15	+21
5	(New Zealand) Daphne Le Breton, Denise Page, Jennifer Simpson, Vera Bindon	12	7	0	5	14	+21
6	(Eswatini) Anne Green, Liz James, Mariana Goddard, Wendy Vickery	12	7	0	5	14	-28
7	(Scotland) Annette Evans, Frances Whyte, Jen Menzies, Sarah Gourlay	12	6	1	5	13	+19
8	(Fiji) Betty Olssen, Filo O'Meagher, La Young, Robin Forster	12	4	2	6	10	+1
9	(Guernsey) Fleur Bougourd, Hilda White, June Finigan, Peggy Fish	12	5	0	7	10	-56
10	(Botswana) Denise David, Jacqueline Rhodes, Olwen Leadbitter, Yvonne Richards	12	4	0	8	8	-13
11	(Northern Ireland) Hilda Hamilton, Kathleen Megrath, Maureen Mallon, Nan Allely	12	4	0	8	8	-51
12	(Canada) Dorothy Mogridge, Elaine Jones, Jean Wintermute, Mari Paterson	12	3	1	8	7	-43
13	(Malawi) Audrey Ross, Edith Haining, Iris Hartley, Margaret Penman	12	1	1	10	3	-114

== See also ==
- List of Commonwealth Games medallists in lawn bowls
- Lawn bowls at the Commonwealth Games
