= Elva Bradley =

Fijian international lawn bowler

Personal information
- Nationality: Fiji

Sport
- Sport: Lawn bowls
Medal record
Representing Fiji
World Outdoor Championships
Silver medal – second place	1969 Sydney	fours
Bronze medal – third place	1969 Sydney	team

Elva Bradley is a former Fijian international lawn bowler.

== Bowls career ==
In 1969 she won the fours silver medal with Ateca Robinson, Olive Patton, Clarice Woolley at the 1969 World Outdoor Bowls Championship in Sydney, Australia. She also won a bronze medal in the team event (Taylor Trophy).
