= 1985 World Outdoor Bowls Championship =

Bowls championship held in Melbourne, Australia

Women's World Outdoor Championships 1985
- 5th Women's World Outdoor Bowls Championships
- Location: Melbourne, Australia
- Date(s): 13 February – 4 March, 1985.
- Category: World Bowls Championship

The 1985 Women's World Outdoor Bowls Championship was held at the Reservoir Bowling Club in Preston, Victoria, Melbourne, Australia from 13 February to 4 March 1985.

Merle Richardson of Australia won the Sylko Trophy (Singles Gold medal), Australia also won the Sussex Trophy (Pairs) and Worthing Trophy (Triples). Scotland secured the Henselite Trophy (Fours) and Australia won the Taylor Trophy, sponsored by the Daily Mirror for the being the best overall team.

== Medallists ==
Event	Gold	Silver	Bronze
Women's singles	(Australia); Merle Richardson	(Fiji); Maraia Lum On	(New Zealand); Rhoda Ryan
Women's pairs	(Australia); Merle Richardson; Fay Craig	(Fiji); Maraia Lum On; Willow Fong	(England); Jean Valls; Norma Shaw
Women's triples	(Australia); Dorothy Roche; Norma Massey; Mavis Meadowcroft	(Hong Kong); Helen Wong; Rae O'Donnell; Sandra Zakoske	(Wales); Linda Parker; Mair Jones; Rita Jones
Women's fours	(Scotland); Sarah Gourlay; Elizabeth Christie; Annette Evans; Frances Whyte	(Australia); Mavis Meadowcroft; Norma Massey; Fay Craig; Dorothy Roche	(England); Mavis Steele; Betty Stubbings; Brenda Atherton; Jean Valls
Women's Team	Australia	England	New Zealand

== Results ==
=== Women's singles – round robin ===
Pos	Player	P	W	L	Pts
1	(Australia) Merle Richardson	18	18	0	18
2	(Fiji) Maraia Lum On	18	16	2	16
3	(New Zealand) Rhoda Ryan	18	15	3	15
4	(England) Norma Shaw	18	15	3	15
5	(Zimbabwe) Flo Kennedy	18	14	4	14
6	(Republic of Ireland) Eileen Bell	18	13	5	13
7	(Canada) June Bell	18	11	7	11
8	(Israel) Helen Gordon	18	10	8	10
9	(Papua New Guinea) Kathy Sigimet	18	10	8	10
10	(Scotland) Senga McCrone	18	10	8	10
11	(Wales) Julie Davies	18	10	8	10
12	(Botswana) Babs Anderson	18	9	9	9
13	(Samoa) Pula Laufili V. Faraimo	18	8	10	8
14	(Hong Kong) Lena Sadick	18	7	11	7
15	(Kenya) Alice Mayers	18	6	12	6
16	(Jersey) Margaret Blatmann	18	5	13	5
17	(United States) Muriel 'Pat' Boehm	18	5	13	5
18	(Argentina) Maria de Gismondi	18	4	14	4
19	(Eswatini) Cynthia Thompson	18	4	14	4

=== Women's pairs – round robin ===
Pos	Player	P	W	D	L	Pts
1	(Australia) Merle Richardson & Fay Craig	18	14	0	3	28 +44
2	(Fiji) Maraia Lum On & Willow Fong	18	14	0	4	28 +28
3	(England) Jean Valls & Norma Shaw	18	13	0	5	26
4	(Republic of Ireland) Eileen Bell & Nan Allely	18	12	1	5	25
5	(New Zealand) Joyce Osborne & Barbara Kunicich	18	12	1	5	25
6	(Scotland) Elizabeth Christie & Senga McCrone	18	12	0	6	24
7	(Israel) Helen Gordon & Rina Lebel	18	11	0	7	22
8	(Canada) Alice Duncalf & Jean Black	18	11	0	7	22
9	(Papua New Guinea) Kathy Sigimet & Maggie Worri	18	10	1	7	21
10	(Zimbabwe) Peggy Mitchell & Onei Dolphin	18	10	1	7	21
11	(United States) Edith Denton & Muriel 'Pat' Boehm	18	10	0	8	20
12	(Wales) Julie Davies & Betty Morgan	18	9	1	8	19
13	(Hong Kong) Joan Humphreys & Lena Sadick	18	9	0	9	18
14	(Kenya) Alice Mayers & Mavis Cattermole	18	9	0	9	18
15	(Jersey) Margaret Blattmann & Jean Lowery	18	8	0	10	16
16	(Botswana) June Fulton & Babs Anderson	18	7	0	11	14
17	(Eswatini) Jenny Viegas & Cynthia Thompson	18	7	0	11	14
18	(Argentina) Maria de Gismondi & Maria Rohan	18	4	1	13	9
19	(Samoa) Pativaine Ainuu & Pula Laufili V. Faraimo	18	4	1	13	9

=== Women's triples – round robin ===
Pos	Player	P	W	D	L	Pts
1	(Australia) Dorothy Roche, Norma Massey & Mavis Meadowcroft	18	17	0	1	34
2	(Hong Kong) Helen Wong, Rae O'Donnell & Sandra Zakoske	18	15	0	3	30
3	(Wales) Linda Parker, Mair Jones & Rita Jones	18	14	1	3	29
4	(England) Brenda Atherton, Betty Stubbings & Mavis Steele	18	14	0	4	28
5	(New Zealand) Daphne Le Breton, Jean Moffat, Rhoda Ryan	18	13	0	5	26
6	(Scotland) Sarah Gourlay, Annette Evans & Frances Whyte	18	13	0	5	26
7	(Fiji) Janki Gaunder, Adi Losalini Browne & Filo O'Meagher	18	12	1	5	25
8	(Canada) June Bell, Agnes Bowlby & Jean Wintermute	18	11	1	6	23
9	(Zimbabwe) Flo Kennedy, Ilya Loader, Margaret Mills	17	11	1	6	23
10	(Botswana) Heather Roberts, Margaret Farmer & Yvonne Richards	17	11	0	7	22
11	(Republic of Ireland) Myra Wilson, Marie Barber & Margaret Johnston	18	10	0	8	20
12	(United States) Jo Gilbert, Isabella Forbes & Corinna Folkins	18	9	0	9	18
13	(Eswatini) Di Cochram, Liz James & Pat MacDonagh	18	8	0	10	16
14	(Papua New Guinea) Kapa Rawali, Onno Pelei & Olive Babaga	18	7	1	10	15
15	(Israel) Bernice Pillemer, Bernice Katz & Miriam Jankelowitz	18	6	1	11	13
16	(Jersey) Barbara Le Moignan, Doreen Gay, Kath Hickman	18	6	1	11	13
17	(Kenya) Sue Hesketh, Muriel Jennings, Jean Haggerty	18	5	1	12	11
18	(Samoa) Matua Ane Faaso'o, Josephine Hunt & Lemafoe Lagaala-Porter	18	3	0	15	6
19	(Argentina) Dora de Jahn, Leyla de Gourville & Susana de Cantarini	18	2	0	16	4

=== Women's fours – round robin ===
Pos	Player	P	W	D	L	Pts
1	(Scotland) Sarah Gourlay, Elizabeth Christie, Annette Evans & Frances Whyte	18	15	1	2	31
2	(Australia) Mavis Meadowcroft, Norma Massey, Fay Craig & Dorothy Roche	18	15	0	3	30
3	(England) Mavis Steele, Betty Stubbings, Brenda Atherton & Jean Valls	18	14	1	3	29
4	(New Zealand) Daphne Le Breton, Barbara Kunicich, Joyce Osborne & Jean Moffat	18	13	1	4	27
5	(Zimbabwe) Peggy Mirchell, Ilya Loader, Onei Dolphin, Margaret Mills	18	13	0	5	26
6	(Hong Kong) Sandra Zakoske, Joan Humphreys, Rae O'Donnell & Helen Wong	18	13	0	5	26
7	(Israel) Bernice Pillemer, Bernice Katz, Miriam Jankelowitz & Rina Lebel	18	12	1	5	25
8	(Wales) Linda Parker, Mair Jones, Rita Jones & Betty Morgan	18	12	0	6	24
9	(Republic of Ireland) Myra Wilson, Marie Barber, Nan Allely & Margaret Johnston	18	11	0	7	22
10	(Botswana) Heather Roberts, June Fulton, Margaret Farmer & Yvonne Richards	18	10	1	7	21
11	(Eswatini) Di Cochram, Liz James, Pat MacDonagh & Jenny Viegas	18	9	0	9	18
12	(United States) Jo Gilbert, Edith Denton, Isabella Forbes & Corinna Folkins	18	8	0	10	16
13	(Samoa) Pativaine Ainuu, Matua Faaso’o, Josephine Hunt & Lemafoe Lagaala-Porter	18	8	0	10	16
14	(Fiji) Janki Gaunder, Adi Losalini Browne, Willow Fong & Filo O'Meagher	18	8	0	10	16
15	(Papua New Guinea) Kapa Rawali, Onno Pelei, Olive Babaga & Maggie Worri	18	7	1	10	15
16	(Canada) Agnes Bowlby, Jean Wintermute, Alice Duncalf & Kathy Finch	18	7	0	11	14
17	(Kenya) Sue Hesketh, Muriel Jennings, Jean Haggerty & Mavis Cattermole	18	5	0	13	10
18	(Jersey) Barbara Le Moignan, Doreen Gay, Kath Hickman & Jean Lowery	18	4	0	14	8
19	(Argentina) Dora de Jahn, Leyla de Gourville, Susana de Cantarini & Maria Rohan	18	2	0	16	4

=== Taylor Trophy ===
Pos	Player	Singles	Pairs	Triples	Fours	Total
1	Australia	19	19	19	18	75
2	England	16	17	16	17	66
3	New Zealand	17	15	15	16	63
4	Scotland	12	14	15	19	60
5	Fiji	18	18	13	8	57
6	Zimbabwe	15	11	12	15	53
7	(Republic of Ireland) Ireland	14	16	9	11	50
8	Wales	12	8	17	12	49
9	Hong Kong	6	7	18	15	46
10	Papua New Guinea	12	11	6	5	44
11	Israel	12	13	5	13	43
12	Canada	13	13	12	4	42
13	Botswana	8	4	10	10	32
14	United States	4	9	8	8	29
15	(Eswatini) Swaziland	2	4	7	9	26
16	Western Samoa	7	2	2	8	19
17	Kenya	5	7	3	3	18
18	Jersey	4	5	5	2	16
19	Argentina	2	2	1	1	6
