= Lawn bowls at the 1983 South Pacific Games =

- Location: Apia, Western Samoa
- Dates: 5–16 September 1983

Lawn Bowls at the 1983 South Pacific Games was held from 5 to 16 September 1983 in Apia, Western Samoa.

== Men's results ==
Event	Gold	Silver	Bronze
Singles	(Norfolk Island); Keith Turton	(Samoa)	(Fiji); Peter Fong
Pairs	(Papua New Guinea)	(Fiji); Peter Fong; Kevin Perry	(Samoa)
Triples	(Samoa)	(Fiji); Jav Naidu; William Young; Geoff O'Meagher	(Papua New Guinea)
Fours	(Norfolk Island); Lyle Hutchinson; Sid Cooper; Gaeton Boudan; Barry Wilson	(Fiji); Jav Naidu; William Young; Geoff O'Meagher; Kevin Perry	(Papua New Guinea)

== Women's results ==
Event	Gold	Silver	Bronze
Singles	(Fiji); Willow Fong	(Cook Islands)	(Samoa); Matua Ane Faaso'o
Pairs	(Fiji); Janki Gaunder; Filo O'Meagher	(Cook Islands)	(Norfolk Island); J Vincent; Pauline Turton
Triples	(Cook Islands)	(Fiji); Willow Fong; Lavenia Young; Robin Forster	(Papua New Guinea); Kathy Sigimet; Olive Babaga
Fours	(Fiji); Robin Forster; Janki Gaunder; Lavenia Young; Filo O'Meagher	(Cook Islands)	(Samoa); Aliitasi Tauaa; Pula Laufili V.Faraimo

== See also ==
- Lawn bowls at the Pacific Games
