= Duncalf =

Duncalf is a surname. Notable people with the surname include:

- Alice Duncalf (fl. 1986), Canadian lawn bowler
- Dave Duncalf (1934–2003), British-born Canadian international lawn bowler
- Jenny Duncalf (born 1982), British squash player
