= Dan Milligan =

Personal information
- Nationality: Canada
- Born: 1953 (age 72–73) Canada

Sport
- Club: Cobourg LBC
Medal record
Representing Canada
Commonwealth Games
Silver medal – second place	1986 Edinburgh	fours

Dan Milligan is a former Canadian international lawn bowler and coach.

He won a silver medal in the fours at the 1986 Commonwealth Games in Edinburgh with Dave Duncalf, Dave Brown and Dave Houtby.

He was coach for the men's and women's team at the 1994 Commonwealth Games.

== Personal life ==
He is a co-owner of MVP Sports and a retired youth centre teacher. A keen curler, he moved to Cobourg in 1990 and helped establish the West Northumberland Curling Club.

His sister, Sharyl Ann, is also a former Canadian international lawn bowler.
