= Norma Massey =

Australian lawn bowls player

Personal information
- Nationality: Australian
- Born: 1924
- Died: October 2014 (aged 89–90)

Sport
- Sport: Lawn bowls
- Club: Yarraville Footscray Bowling Club
Medal record
Representing Australia
World Outdoor Championships
Bronze medal – third place	1969 Sydney	singles
Silver medal – second place	1969 Sydney	triples
Silver medal – second place	1969 Sydney	team
Gold medal – first place	1977 Worthing	team
Gold medal – first place	1985 Melbourne	triples
Silver medal – second place	1985 Melbourne	fours
Gold medal – first place	1985 Melbourne	team
Asia Pacific Bowls Championships
Gold medal – first place	1985 Tweed Heads	triples
Silver medal – second place	1985 Tweed Heads	fours

Norma Massey (1924-2014) was an international lawn bowls competitor for Australia.

== Bowls career ==
=== World Championships ===
Massey won the singles bronze medal and triples silver medal with Connie Hicks and Mary Ormsby, at the 1969 World Outdoor Bowls Championship in Sydney and also won a silver medal in the team event (Taylor Trophy).

Eight years later she represented Australia in the singles and triples events finishing just outside the medals but was part of the team that claimed the gold medal in the team event (Taylor Trophy).

Sixteen years after her first World Championships she won the triples gold medal with Dorothy Roche and Mavis Meadowcroft, the fours silver medal with Meadowcroft, Roche and Fay Craig and the team event gold medal at the 1985 World Outdoor Bowls Championship in Melbourne.

=== Asia Pacific Championships ===
She won two medals at the Asia Pacific Bowls Championships including a gold medal in the 1985 triples at Tweed Heads, New South Wales.

=== National ===
Norma joined Yarraville Seddon Bowling Club in 1953 and represented Australia in 104 times.

== Awards ==
Massey was awarded the Order of Australia for services to bowls in 2006. In 2011 she was inducted into Bowls Australia’s Hall of Fame. She died in October 2014.
