= Pam Griffiths =

Welsh international lawn bowler

Personal information
- Nationality: British (Welsh)

Sport
- Sport: Lawn and indoor bowls
- Club: Merthyr West End BC
Medal record
Representing Wales
World Outdoor Championships
Bronze medal – third place	1988 Auckland	fours

Pamela "Pam" Griffiths is a former international lawn bowls competitor from Wales who competed at the Commonwealth Games.

== Biography ==
In 1988, she won the bronze medal in the fours at the 1988 World Outdoor Bowls Championship in Auckland with Margaret Pomeroy, Mary Hughes and Linda Parker.

Two years later, she represented the Welsh team at the 1990 Commonwealth Games in Auckland, New Zealand, where she competed in the pairs event with Mary Hughes.

In 2006 she was part of the coaching staff during the 2006 Commonwealth Games.
