= Mary Hughes (bowls) =

Welsh lawn bowler

Personal information
- Nationality: British (Welsh)

Sport
- Sport: Lawn and indoor bowls
- Club: Skewen BC & Earlswood IBC
Medal record
Representing Wales
World Outdoor Championships
Bronze medal – third place	1988 Auckland	fours

Mary Hughes is a former international lawn bowls competitor from Wales who competed at the Commonwealth Games.

== Biography ==
In 1988 Hughes won the bronze medal in the fours at the 1988 World Outdoor Bowls Championship in Auckland with Margaret Pomeroy, Pam Griffiths and Linda Parker.

Hughes represented the Welsh team at the 1990 Commonwealth Games in Auckland, New Zealand, where she competed in the pairs event, with Pam Griffiths.

Two years later she represented Wales at the 1990 Commonwealth Games.
