= Heather Roberts =

Motswana lawn bowler

Personal information
- Nationality: Botswana
Medal record
Representing Botswana
World Outdoor Championships
Silver medal – second place	1988 Auckland	pairs

Heather Roberts is an international lawn bowler from Botswana.

Fulton started bowling in 1974 in Zambia. After moving to Jwaneng at the end of 1979 she was a founder member of the Jwaneng Bowls Club. She won the National Pairs in 1983 and was a finalist in 1984 before being selected for the 1985 World Outdoor Bowls Championship.

She won a silver medal with June Fulton in the pairs at the 1988 World Outdoor Bowls Championship in Auckland.

She also competed in the pairs with Jacqueline Rhodes at the 1990 Commonwealth Games
