= Elizabeth Christie =

Elizabeth Christie may refer to:

- Elizabeth Christie (bowls), Scottish international lawn and indoor bowler
- Bessie Christie, full name Elizabeth Froomes Christie, (1904–1983), New Zealand artist
