= Daphne Le Breton =

New Zealand lawn bowler

Personal information
- Nationality: New Zealander
- Born: 1 August 1932
- Died: 25 March 2000 (aged 67)

Sport
- Club: Upper Hutt BC; Raumati South BC
Medal record
Representing (New Zealand)
World Outdoor Championships
Bronze medal – third place	1985 Melbourne	team
Asia Pacific Bowls Championships
Gold medal – first place	1985 Tweed Heads	fours
Silver medal – second place	1985 Tweed Heads	triples

Daphne Charlotte Le Breton (1 August 1932 – 25 March 2000) was a New Zealand international lawn bowler.

== Bowls career ==
Le Breton represented New Zealand at the Commonwealth Games in the fours event at the 1986 Commonwealth Games. She won gold and silver medal at the 1985 Asia Pacific Bowls Championships in Tweed Heads. She was a New Zealand champion, winning the 1984 singles title at the New Zealand National Bowls Championships.

Le Breton died on 25 March 2000, aged 67.
