= Sandra Zakoske =

Sandi Zakoske
Personal information
- Nationality: Hong Kong
Medal record
Representing (Hong Kong) Hong Kong
World Outdoor Championships
Silver medal – second place	1985 Melbourne	triples
Bronze medal – third place	1988 Auckland	triples

Sandra 'Sandi' Zakoske is a former Hong Kong international lawn and indoor bowler.

Zakoske won a silver medal in the triples at the 1985 World Outdoor Bowls Championship in Melbourne with Rae O'Donnell and Helen Wong. She also won a triples medal at the 1988 World Outdoor Bowls Championship in Auckland after securing a bronze medal with O'Donnell and Naty Rozario.

She was national champion in 1977.
