= Phyl Spyers =

PNG international lawn bowler

Personal information
- Nationality: Papua New Guinea

Sport
- Sport: Lawn bowls
Medal record
Representing Papua New Guinea
World Outdoor Championships
Bronze medal – third place	1969 Sydney	triples

Phyl Spyers is a former Papua New Guinea international lawn bowler.

== Bowls career ==
In 1969 she won the triples bronze medal at the 1969 World Outdoor Bowls Championship in Sydney, Australia.
