= Jean Valls =

British lawn bowler

Personal information
- Nationality: British (English)

Sport
- Club: Raynes Park & Surrey
Medal record
Representing England
World Outdoor Championships
Bronze medal – third place	1985 Melbourne	pairs
Bronze medal – third place	1985 Melbourne	fours
Silver medal – second place	1985 Melbourne	team
Commonwealth Games
Bronze medal – third place	1986 Edinburgh	pairs
British Isles Championships
Gold medal – first place	1984	singles
Gold medal – first place	1984	pairs

Jean Valls is a former England international lawn and indoor bowler.

== Bowls career ==
Valls won two bronze medals in the pairs and fours at the 1985 World Outdoor Bowls Championship in Melbourne in addition to winning a bronze medal at the Commonwealth Games

She also won three National Titles; (singles 1983), (pairs 1982 & 1983). She subsequently won the singles at the British Isles Bowls Championships in 1984. Valls was runner-up in the fours in 1976.
