= Dave Houtby =

Personal information
- Nationality: Canadian
- Born: 1951 (age 74–75) St. Catharines, Ontario

Sport
- Club: Niagara Falls Lawn Bowling Club
Medal record
Representing Canada
World Outdoor Championships
Silver medal – second place	1992 Worthing	fours
Commonwealth Games
Silver medal – second place	1986 Edinburgh	fours
Asia Pacific Bowls Championships
Silver medal – second place	1989 Suva	triples
Bronze medal – third place	1989 Suva	fours
Bronze medal – third place	1991 Kowloon	triples
Gold medal – first place	1991 Kowloon	fours

Dave Houtby (born 1951) is a Canadian former international lawn and indoor bowler.

== Bowls career ==
Houtby won a bronze medal in the fours at the 1992 World Outdoor Bowls Championship in Worthing.

He also won a silver medal in the fours at the 1986 Commonwealth Games in Edinburgh.

He won four medals at the 1991 Asia Pacific Bowls Championships, including a gold in the fours with Ronnie Jones, Dave Brown and Bill Boettger, in Kowloon, Hong Kong.
