= Jayne Roylance =

English lawn bowler

Personal information
- Born: 8 October 1947 Fakenham, Norfolk, England
- Died: 3 November 2018 (aged 71)

Sport
- Club: County Arts Bowls Club (Norwich)
Medal record
Representing England
World Outdoor Championships
Silver medal – second place	1988 Auckland	Triples
Silver medal – second place	1988 Auckland	Fours
Gold medal – first place	1988 Auckland	Team
Commonwealth Games
Bronze medal – third place	1990 Auckland	Pairs

Jayne Elizabeth Roylance (née Ward) (8 October 1947– 3 November 2018) was a lawn bowls international for England.

== Bowls career ==
Roylance won a silver medal in the women's triples with Norma Shaw and Barbara Fuller during the 1988 World Outdoor Bowls Championship in Auckland.

Two years later she won a bronze medal in the pairs with Mary Price at the Commonwealth Games and four years later Roylance represented England in the fours event, at the 1994 Commonwealth Games in Victoria, British Columbia, Canada.

In addition she has also won three National titles and one national competition representing Norfolk. The fours in 1985, the two wood singles in 1988 and the triples in 1989

== Family ==
Her brothers Chris Ward and David Ward were both international players.
