= Cliff Williams (bowls) =

Welsh international lawn bowler

Personal information
- Nationality: British (Welsh)

Sport
- Sport: Lawn and indoor bowls
- Club: Gowerton BC

Cliff Williams is a former international lawn and indoor bowler from Wales who competed at the Commonwealth Games.

== Biography ==
Williams was a member of the Gowerton Bowls Club and represented Wales at the 1981 Home International Championship.

In 1981 representing Wales, he partnered Alun Thomas in the Australian bowls classic in Newcastle and won a bronze medal.

Williams represented the Welsh team at the 1982 Commonwealth Games in Brisbane, Australia, where he competed in the fours event, with Jim Morgan, Ray Williams and Alun Thomas. The quartet just missed the medals rostrum after finishing in fourth place.

Williams was later selected for the 1983 Home International Championship.
