= Linda Parker =

Linda Parker may refer to:

- Linda Vivienne Parker (born 1958), American judge
- Linda Parker (bowls) (born 1929), Welsh lawn and indoor bowler
