= Dorrie Costello =

Personal information
- Nationality: Fiji

Sport
- Sport: Lawn bowls
Medal record
Representing Fiji
World Outdoor Championships
Bronze medal – third place	1969 Sydney	team

Dorrie Costello is a former Fijian international lawn bowler.

== Bowls career ==
In 1969 she just missed out on a singles bronze medal after finishing fourth on points difference at the 1969 World Outdoor Bowls Championship in Sydney, Australia. She did however win a bronze medal is a member of the team that finished third in the team event (Taylor Trophy).
