= Garin Beare =

Zimbabwe international lawn and indoor bowler

Personal information
- Nationality: Zimbabwe
- Born: 26 February 1939 Lourenço Marques, Portuguese Mozambique
Medal record
Representing Zimbabwe
World Outdoor Championships
Bronze medal – third place	1988 Auckland	singles

Garin Beare is a former Zimbabwe international lawn and indoor bowler.

He won a bronze medal in the singles at the 1988 World Outdoor Bowls Championship in Auckland.
