= John Ottaway =

English lawn bowler

Personal information
- Nationality: British (English)
- Born: 2 June 1955 (age 71)

Sport
- Club: Wymondham Dell BC
Medal record
Representing England
World Outdoor Championships
Bronze medal – third place	1988 Auckland	triples
Bronze medal – third place	1988 Auckland	fours
Gold medal – first place	1988 Auckland	team
Silver medal – second place	1992 Worthing	team
Commonwealth Games
Gold medal – first place	2002	Men's fours
British Isles Championships
Gold medal – first place	1990	singles

John Ottaway is an English international lawn bowler born on 2 June 1955.

== Bowls career ==
John began bowling in 1970 aged just 15 and played indoors and outdoors for Wymondham Dell club in Norfolk.

He represented England at the 1990 Commonwealth Games in the fours, at the 1990 Commonwealth Games in Auckland, New Zealand and the fours at the 1998 Commonwealth Games in Kuala Lumpur, Malaysia.

His greatest moment came when winning the gold medal at the 2002 Commonwealth Games in the Men's fours at the 2002 Commonwealth Games. John became Norfolk bowls president in 2014.

He has won five National Championship titles in 1989, 1990, 1996, 2000 and 2001 and won the singles at the British Isles Bowls Championships in 1990.
