= Joan Ricketts =

Welsh international lawn bowler

Personal information
- Nationality: British (Welsh)

Sport
- Sport: Lawn and indoor bowls
- Club: Bailey Park BC, Abergavenny
Medal record
Representing Wales
Commonwealth Games
Gold medal – first place	1986 Edinburgh	fours

Joan Ricketts is a former Welsh international lawn bowler.

== Biography ==
Ricketts represented the Welsh team at the 1986 Commonwealth Games in Edinburgh, Scotland and was part of the fours team, with Linda Parker, Linda Evans and Rita Jones that won the gold medal.

Ricketts was twice champion of Wales at the Welsh National Bowls Championships, winning the triples in 1983 and the pairs in 1984, both while a member of the Bailey Park Bowls Club in Abergavenny.
