= Barbara Fuller =

Former English lawn bowls international bowler

Personal information
- Nationality: British (English)

Sport
- Club: Broomfield BC
Medal record
Representing England
World Outdoor Championships
Silver medal – second place	1988 Auckland	Triples
Silver medal – second place	1988 Auckland	Fours
Gold medal – first place	1988 Auckland	Team
Commonwealth Games
Bronze medal – third place	1986 Edinburgh	Fours

Barbara Fuller is a former lawn bowls international for England.

== Bowls career ==
Fuller won a bronze medal in the fours with Brenda Atherton, Madge Allan and Mary Price at the 1986 Commonwealth Games. Two years later she won a silver medal in the women's triples with Norma Shaw and Jayne Roylance during the 1988 World Outdoor Bowls Championship in Auckland.

In addition she has also won two National titles representing Middlesex. They were the fours in 1982 and the triples in 1984.
