= Pam Hart =

Australian lawn bowler

Personal information
- Nationality: Australia

Sport
- Sport: Lawn bowls
- Club: New South Wales
Medal record
Representing Australia
World Outdoor Championships
Silver medal – second place	1969 Sydney	pairs
Bronze medal – third place	1969 Sydney	fours
Silver medal – second place	1969 Sydney	team

Pam Hart is a former international lawn bowls competitor for Australia.

== Bowls career ==
She won a silver medal in the pairs with Jean Turnbull and bronze medal in the fours with Turnbull, Connie Hicks and Mary Ormsby at the 1969 World Outdoor Bowls Championship in Sydney. She also won a silver medal in the team event (Taylor Trophy) in 1969.
