= Alun Thomas (bowls) =

Welsh international lawn bowler

Personal information
- Nationality: British (Welsh)
- Born: c.1945

Sport
- Sport: Lawn and indoor bowls
- Club: BSC, Ebbw Vale BC

Alun Thomas (born c.1945) is a former international lawn and indoor bowler from Wales who competed at the Commonwealth Games.

== Biography ==
Thomas began playing bowls in 1973 with his company's bowls team at British Steel Corporation in Ebbw Vale, where he worked as a spares manager. He made his international debut for Wales indoors in 1978 and lived in Pennant Street.

In 1981 representing Wales, he partnered Cliff Williams in the Australian bowls classic in Newcastle and won a bronze medal.

Thomas represented the Welsh team at the 1982 Commonwealth Games in Brisbane, Australia, where he competed in the fours event, with Jim Morgan, Ray Williams and Cliff Williams. The quartet just missed the medals rostrum after finishing in fourth place.

The following year he won the 1983 Hoover singles title and represented Wales at the 1988 World Bowls Championship.
