= June Fulton =

Botswanian lawn bowler

Personal information
- Nationality: Botswana
Medal record
Representing Botswana
World Outdoor Championships
Silver medal – second place	1988 Auckland	pairs

June Fulton is an international lawn bowler from Botswana.

Fulton was a winner or runner-up in Harare W.B.A competitions from 1977 to 1983 and was selected for the 1985 World Outdoor Bowls Championship.

Three years later, she won a silver medal with Heather Roberts in the pairs at the 1988 World Outdoor Bowls Championship in Auckland.
