= Yetta =

Yetta is a given name. Notable people with the name include:

- Yetta Barsh Shachtman (1915–1996), American socialist politician
- Yetta Emanuel, South African lawn bowler
- Yetta Dorothea Geffen (1891–1986), American journalist, musician, and theatre professional
- Yetta Zwerling (1894–1982), Yiddish movie star

Fictional

- Yetta Rosenberg, character from The Nanny
