= Lawn bowls at the 2007 South Pacific Games =

- Location: Apia, Samoa
- Dates: 25 August to 8 September 2007

Lawn Bowls at the 2007 South Pacific Games was held 25 August to 8 September 2007 in Apia, Samoa.

== Men's results ==
| Event | Gold | Silver | Bronze |
|---|---|---|---|
| Singles | (Samoa); Valovale Aukuso Pritchard | (Cook Islands) | (Fiji); Ratish Lal |
| Pairs | (Papua New Guinea); Peter Juni; Pomat Topal | (Fiji); Ratish Lal; Arun Kumar | (Samoa); Valovale Aukuso Pritchard; Namulauulu Olopoto Letufuga |
| Triples | (Tokelau); Lotomalie Fakaalofa; Sagato Alefosio; Sakaraia Patelesio | (Fiji); Semesa Naiseruvati; Rajnish Lal; Sushil Sharma | (Samoa); Ieremia Leautuli; Ioane Loli; Aliivaa Liva Andrews |
| Fours | (Fiji); Arun Kumar; Semesa Naiseruvati; Rajnish Lal; Sushil Sharma | (Papua New Guinea) | (Tokelau) |

== Women's results ==
| Event | Gold | Silver | Bronze |
|---|---|---|---|
| Singles | (Tokelau); Violina Linda Pedro | (Cook Islands); Porea Elisa | (Samoa); Feaomaleula Wright |
| Pairs | (Tokelau); Violina Linda Pedro; Opetera Samakia Ngatoko | (Samoa); Manuia Porter; Lufilufi Taulealo | (Cook Islands); Porea Elisa; Martina Akaruru |
| Triples | (Cook Islands); Kanny Vaile; Mourauri Tangata Tokorangi; Matangaro Irene Tupuna | (Samoa); Feaomaleula Wright; Christina Gabriel; Catherine Ulberg | (Fiji); Varisila Vosalotaki; Nellie Ranadi Gaunavou; Soro Scott |
| Fours | (Cook Islands); Martina Akaruru; Kanny Vaile; Mourauri Tangata Tokorangi; Matangaro Irene Tupuna | (Fiji); Varisila Vosalotaki; Nellie Ranadi Gaunavou; Soro Scott; Loretta Kotoisuva | (Tokelau); Repeka Asi; Sasa Te'o; Opertera Samakia Ngatoko; Alieta Tiuioteo |

== See also ==
- Lawn bowls at the Pacific Games
