= Willie Paul (bowls) =

Former Scottish international lawn and indoor bowler

Personal information
- Nationality: British (Scottish)
- Born: 9 June 1944

Sport
- Club: Tanfield (outdoor); Edinburgh (indoor)
Medal record
Representing Scotland
World Outdoor Championships
Silver medal – second place	1988 Auckland	triples
Bronze medal – third place	1988 Auckland	team
Scottish Nationals
Gold medal – first place	1984	singles

William Paul is a former Scottish international lawn and indoor bowler.

== Bowls career ==
He won a silver medal in the triples at the 1988 World Outdoor Bowls Championship in Auckland.

He was a national champion in 1984 after winning the singles at the Scottish National Bowls Championships.

== Football ==
Willie is also a former Third Lanark A.C. goalkeeper, having played 22 games in season 1963–64.
