= Jean Turnbull =

Personal information
- Nationality: Australia

Sport
- Sport: Lawn bowls
- Club: Queensland
Medal record
Representing Australia
World Outdoor Championships
Silver medal – second place	1969 Sydney	pairs
Bronze medal – third place	1969 Sydney	fours
Silver medal – second place	1969 Sydney	team

Jean Turnbull is a former international lawn bowls competitor for Australia.

== Bowls career ==
She won a silver medal in the pairs with Pam Hart and a bronze medal in the fours with Hart, Connie Hicks and Mary Ormsby at the 1969 World Outdoor Bowls Championship in Sydney. She also won a silver medal in the team event (Taylor Trophy).
