= Mair Jones =

Welsh lawn and indoor bowler

Personal information
- Nationality: Wales

Sport
- Club: Pengelli BC
Medal record
lawn bowls
World Outdoor Championships
Bronze medal – third place	1985 Melbourne	triples

Mair Jones is a former Welsh international lawn and indoor bowler.

In 1985 Jones won a triples bronze medal at the 1985 World Outdoor Bowls Championship in Preston, Victoria, Melbourne, Australia with Rita Jones and Linda Parker.

Jones played for the Welsh International team for 17 years and was a National Champion in 1962.
