= Mary Ormsby (bowls) =

Australian bowls player (1927–2019)

Personal information
- Nationality: Australia
- Born: 1927
- Died: 2019 (aged 91–92)

Sport
- Sport: Lawn bowls
Medal record
Representing Australia
World Outdoor Championships
Silver medal – second place	1969 Sydney	triples
Bronze medal – third place	1969 Sydney	fours
Silver medal – second place	1969 Sydney	team

Mary Ormsby (1927-2019) was an international lawn bowls competitor for Australia.

== Bowls career ==
She won a silver medal in the triples with Norma Massey and Connie Hicks and the bronze medal with Pam Hart, Hicks and Jean Turnbull at the 1969 World Outdoor Bowls Championship in Sydney. She also won a silver medal in the team event (Taylor Trophy) in 1969.

She is the only person to have won all three Australian National Bowls Championships – the singles in 1969, the pairs (with Erica Murada) and the fours.

Ormsby was a winner of the women's South Australian state singles title in 1961-62 and played 167 times for the state.

Ormsby died in 2019.

== Awards ==
In 1985 she was awarded the Order of Australia Medal for services to the sport.
