= Darby Ross =

Australian lawn bowler

Personal information
- Nationality: Australian
Medal record
Representing (Australia)
Asia Pacific Bowls Championships
| Gold medal – first place | 1987 Lae | triples |
| Bronze medal – third place | 1987 Lae | fours |

Darby Ross is a former Australian international lawn bowler.

== Bowls career ==
In 1981, Ross won the inaugural pairs title at the Hong Kong International Bowls Classic; partnering Rob Dobbins they defeated England's Jimmy Hobday and Tony Allcock.

He won a triples gold medal (with Ken Williams and Trevor Morris) and a fours bronze medal, at the 1987 Asia Pacific Bowls Championships, held in Lae, Papua New Guinea.

Ross was selected as part of the five-man team by Australia for the 1988 World Outdoor Bowls Championship, which was held in Auckland, New Zealand.
