= Norma Wainwright =

Personal information
- Nationality: Australia

Sport
- Club: Melville Bowling Club
Medal record
Representing Australia
World Outdoor Championships
Gold medal – first place	1988 Auckland	fours
Silver medal – second place	1988 Auckland	team

Norma Wainwright is a former international lawn bowls competitor for Australia.

She won the fours gold medal at the 1988 World Outdoor Bowls Championship in Auckland.
