= Betty Schenke =

Personal information
- Nationality: Australian

Sport
- Club: Walkerville BC; Port Pirie BC
Medal record
Representing Australia
Commonwealth Games
Silver medal – second place	1986 Edinburgh	fours
Asia Pacific Bowls Championships
Bronze medal – third place	1989 Suva	pairs
Silver medal – second place	1989 Suva	fours

Betty Barbara Schenke married name Betty Greenslade is a former Australian international lawn bowler.

== Bowls career ==
Betty was part of the fours team that won a silver medal at the 1986 Commonwealth Games in Edinburgh.

She joined the Walkerville Bowling Club in 1972 and represented South Australia from 1976 to 1994.

She won two medals at the 1989 Asia Pacific Bowls Championships in the pairs and fours, in Suva, Fiji.
