= 1969 World Outdoor Bowls Championship =

Bowls championship held in Rockdale, Sydney, New South Wales

Women's World Outdoor Championships 1969
- 1st Women's World Outdoor Bowls Championships
- Location: (Australia) Rockdale, Sydney, New South Wales
- Date: 04 - 12 December 1969.
- Category: World Bowls Championship

The 1969 Women's World Outdoor Bowls Championship was held at the Elizabethan Bowls Club in Rockdale, Sydney, New South Wales, Australia, from 4–12 December 1969.

The event was organised by the newly affiliated International Women's Bowling Board in 1969 without the British Isles as members. This resulted in a first International Tournament with just six nations taking part. Gladys Doyle won the singles which was held in a round robin format. The pairs, triples and fours Gold and Taylor trophies all went to South Africa.

== Medallists ==
Event	Gold	Silver	Bronze
Women's singles	(Papua New Guinea); Gladys Doyle	(South Africa); Elsie McDonald	(Australia); Norma Massey
Women's pairs	(South Africa); Elsie McDonald; May Cridlan	(Australia); Pam Hart; Jean Turnbull	(Fiji); Olive Patton; Clarice Woolley
Women's triples	(South Africa); Sara Sundelowitz; Yetta Emanuel; Kathy Bidwell	(Australia); Norma Massey; Connie Hicks; Mary Ormsby	(Papua New Guinea); Alice Murphy; Phyl Spyers; Gladys Doyle
Women's fours	(South Africa); Sara Sundelowitz; Yetta Emanuel; Kathy Bidwell; May Cridlan	(Fiji); Ateca Robinson; Elva Bradley; Olive Patton; Clarice Woolley	(Australia); Pam Hart; Connie Hicks; Jean Turnbull; Mary Ormsby
Women's team	South Africa	Australia	Fiji

== Results ==
=== Women's singles – round robin ===
Round	Tie 1	Tie 2	Tie 3
Round 1	PNG 21 USA 6	Aus 21 Fij 3	Can 5 SAf 21
Round 2	PNG 21 Aus 9	Can 21 USA 3	SAf 15 Fij 21
Round 3	PNG 21 Can 5	Aus 17 SAf 21	Fij 21 USA 13
Round 4	SAf 21 USA 10	PNG 21 Fij 6	Aus 21 Can 10
Round 5	SAf 21 PNG 11	Aus 21 USA 5	Fij 21 Can 10

Pos	Player	P	W	L	Pts	Shots
1	(Papua New Guinea) Gladys Doyle	5	4	1	8	+48
2	(South Africa) Elsie McDonald	5	4	1	8	+35
3	(Australia) Norma Massey	5	3	2	6	+29
4	(Fiji) Dorrie Costello	5	3	2	6	-8
5	(Canada) Isabelle Gilboard	5	1	4	2	-36
6	(United States) Dorothy Mumma	5	0	5	0	-68

=== Women's pairs – round robin ===
Round	Tie 1	Tie 2	Tie 3
Round 1	PNG 30 USA 14	Aus bt Fij 17	SAf 36 Can 12
Round 2	Aus 38 PNG 4	USA 22 bt Can	SAf bt Fij 15
Round 3	Can 23 PNG 22	SAf 24 Aus 22	USA bt Fij 18
Round 4	SAf 24 USA 13	Fij 21 by PNG	Aus 39 Can 5
Round 5	SAf bt PNG	Aus bt USA	Fij bt Can

Pos	Player	P	W	D	L	Pts
1	(South Africa) Elsie McDonald & May Cridlan	5	5	0	0	10
2	(Australia) Pam Hart & Jean Turnbull	5	4	0	1	8
3	(Fiji) Olive Patton & Clarice Woolley	5	2	0	3	4+
4	(United States) Dorothy Veitch & Dorothy Mumma	5	2	0	3	4
5	(Papua New Guinea) Betty Glassey & Kon Allum	5	1	0	4	2
6	(Canada) Olive Parker & Joyce Aitken	5	1	0	4	2

+ more shots

=== Women's triples – round robin ===
Round	Tie 1	Tie 2	Tie 3
Round 1	PNG 25 USA 13	Aus 29 Fij	SAf 57 Can 9
Round 2	Aus 20 PNG 19	Can 15 USA 15	SAf 37 Fij 10
Round 3	PNG 39 Can 10	Aus 19 SAf 19	Fij 30 USA 10
Round 4	PNG 32 Fij 15	SAf 21 bt USA	Aus 30 Can 13
Round 5	SAf bt PNG	Aus bt USA	Fij bt Can

Pos	Player	P	W	D	L	Pts
1	(South Africa) Sara Sundelowitz, Yetta Emanuel & Kathy Bidwell	5	4	1	0	9+
2	(Australia) Norma Massey, Connie Hicks & Mary Ormsby	5	4	1	0	9
3	(Papua New Guinea) Alice Murphy, Phyl Spyers & Gladys Doyle	5	3	0	2	6
4	(Fiji) Ateca Robinson, Elva Bradley & Dorrie Costello	5	2	0	3	4
5	(United States) Vivian Esch, Genevieve Knight & Eleanor Holmes	5	0	1	4	1
6	(Canada) Molly Brew, Chris Burke & Isabelle Gilboard	5	0	1	4	1

+ more shots

=== Women's fours – round robin ===
Round	Tie 1	Tie 2	Tie 3
Round 1	Fij 25 Aus 24	USA 18 PNG 17	SAf 25 Can 11
Round 2	Aus 28 PNG 9	Can 12 USA 28	SAf 37 Fij 12
Round 3	PNG 32 Can 13	Aus 17 SAf 22	Fij 24 USA 18
Round 4	SAf 31 USA 6	Fij 22 PNG 14	Aus 27 Can 16
Round 5	Aus 23 USA 14	SAf 38 PNG 7	Fij 19 Can 18

Pos	Player	P	W	D	L	Pts	Shots
1	(South Africa) Sara Sundelowitz, Yetta Emanuel, Kathy Bidwell & May Cridlan	5	4	0	1	10	+100
2	(Fiji) Ateca Robinson, Elva Bradley, Olive Patton & Clarice Woolley	5	4	0	1	8	-9
3	(Australia) Pam Hart, Connie Hicks, Jean Turnbull & Mary Ormsby	5	3	0	2	6	+33
4	(United States) Vivian Esch, Genevieve Knight, Dorothy Veitch & Eleanor Holmes	5	2	0	3	4	-41
5	(Papua New Guinea) Alice Murphy, Phyl Spyers, Betty Glassey & Kon Allum	5	2	0	3	4	-22
6	(Canada) Molly Brew, Chris Burke, Olive Parker & Joyce Aitken	5	0	0	5	0	-61

=== Taylor Trophy ===
Pos	Player	Singles	Pairs	Triples	Fours	Total
1	South Africa	8	10	9	10	37
2	Australia	6	8	8	6	28
3	Fiji	6	4	4	8	23
4	Papua New Guinea	8	2	4	4	18
5	United States	0	4	1	4	9
6	Canada	2	2	1	0	5
