= Ann Watson =

Scottish international lawn bowler

Personal information
- Nationality: British (Scottish)
- Born: 29 April 1936

Sport
- Sport: Lawn and indoor bowls
- Club: Loanhead BC; Midlothian IBC

Agnes "Ann" Watson (born 29 April 1936) is a former international lawn bowler from Scotland who competed at the Commonwealth Games.

== Biography ==
Watson was a member of the Loanhead Bowls Club in Midlothian and a member of the Midlothian Indoor Bowls Club.

She was the Scottish national indoor triples champion in 1984 and 1985 and British Isles indoor champion in 1984 and singles runner up in 1985.

Watson represented the Scottish team at the 1990 Commonwealth Games in Auckland, New Zealand, where she competed in the fours event, with Janice Maxwell, Joyce Lindores and Annette Evans. At the time of the Games she was a secretary and receptionist at a General Practitioners.
