= David Ward (bowls) =

English lawn bowler

Personal information
- Born: 26 October 1945 Downham Market, Norfolk, England
- Died: 9 June 2005 (aged 59) North Walsham, Norfolk, England

Sport
- Club: Cromer and District Bowling Club
Medal record
Representing (England)
Commonwealth Games
Bronze medal – third place	1986 Edinburgh	pairs

David Spencer Ward (26 October 1945 – 9 June 2005) was an English international lawn and indoor bowler.

== Bowls career ==
He won a bronze medal in the pairs with his elder brother Chris Ward at the 1986 Commonwealth Games in Edinburgh.

He died on 9 June 2005 in a car accident.

== Family ==
In addition to his brother Chris being an international player his sister Jayne Roylance was also an international player and national champion.
