= Marie Smith (bowls) =

Personal information
- Nationality: Guernsey
Medal record
Women's indoor bowls
Representing Guernsey
Commonwealth Games
Silver medal – second place	1986 Edinburgh	Women's pairs

Marie Smith is a former international lawn bowler from Guernsey.

== Bowls career ==
Smith won a silver medal in the Women's pairs at the 1986 Commonwealth Games in Edinburgh with Jenny Nicolle.
