= Chris Ward (bowls) =

English lawn bowler

Personal information
- Born: 25 December 1941 Fakenham, Norfolk, England

Sport
- Club: Cromer and District Bowling Club
Medal record
Representing (England)
Commonwealth Games
Bronze medal – third place	1986 Edinburgh	pairs
British Isles Championships
Gold medal – first place	1983	singles

Christopher C Ward (born 1941) is a England former international lawn bowler.

== Bowls career ==
Ward won a bronze medal in the pairs with his younger brother David Ward at the 1986 Commonwealth Games in Edinburgh. He had earlier represented England in the pairs, at the 1978 Commonwealth Games in Edmonton, Alberta, Canada.

In addition he has won four National titles including the singles in 1977 and 1982, and the fours in 1980.

Ward won the singles at the British Isles Bowls Championships in 1983.

== Family ==
In addition to his brother David being an international player his sister Jayne Roylance was an international player and national champion.
