= Billie Montgomery =

Northern Irish international lawn bowler

Personal information
- Nationality: British (Northern Irish)

Sport
- Sport: Lawn bowls
- Club: Falls BC
Medal record
Representing Northern Ireland
Commonwealth Games
Bronze medal – third place	1986 Edinburgh	fours

Billie Montgomery is a former international lawn bowler from Northern Ireland who competed at the Commonwealth Games.

== Biography ==
Montgomery represented the Northern Irish team at the 1986 Commonwealth Games in Edinburgh, Scotland, where he competed in the fours event, with Ernie Parkinson, Willie Watson and Roy McCune and won a bronze medal.
