= Annette Evans =

Scottish lawn bowls player (born 1944)

Personal information
- Nationality: British (Scottish)
- Born: 28 May 1944
- Height: 168 cm (5 ft 6 in)

Sport
- Sport: Lawn and indoor bowls
- Club: Willowbank BC, Glasgow (outdoor); West of Scotland (indoor)
Medal record
Representing Scotland
World Outdoor Championships
Gold medal – first place	1985 Melbourne	fours
British Isles Championships
Gold medal – first place	1988	singles
Scottish National Championships
Gold medal – first place	1987	singles

Annette C. G. Evans (born 28 May 1944) is a former international lawn bowler who wona world championshiop gold and competed at two Commonwealth Games.

== Biography ==
Evans won the Women's Scottish National Bowls Championships title in 1987 and subsequently won the singles at the British Isles Bowls Championships in 1988. Her biggest accomplishment was winning gold in the fours during the 1985 World Outdoor Bowls Championship with Sarah Gourlay, Elizabeth Christie and Frances Whyte. She also competed at the 1986 Commonwealth Games alongside Gourlay, Whyte and Jen Menzies.

Evans represented the Scottish team at the 1990 Commonwealth Games in Auckland, New Zealand, where she competed in the fours event, with Janice Maxwell, Joyce Lindores and Ann Watson.

Evans retired from international competition later that year in 1990.
