= Elsie McDonald =

Personal information
- Nationality: South Africa
- Born: 12 February 1920 Kimberley, Northern Cape
- Died: 13 December 2012 (aged 92)

Sport
- Sport: Lawn bowls
Medal record
lawn bowls
World Outdoor Championships
Gold medal – first place	1969 Sydney	pairs
Silver medal – second place	1969 Sydney	singles
Gold medal – first place	1969 Sydney	team

Elsie Adelaide McDonald (née Cawood), was a South African international lawn and indoor bowler.

== Bowls career ==
She started bowling in 1958 for the Kimberley Engineering Works BC.

In 1969 she won the gold medal in the pairs with May Cridlan and the silver medal at the 1969 World Outdoor Bowls Championship in Sydney, Australia. She also won a gold medal in the team event (Taylor Trophy).

She was inaugurated into the South African Hall of Fame in 1981.
