= Merle Richardson =

Australian lawn bowls player

Personal information
- Full name: Merle Erica Richardson
- Nationality: Australian
- Born: 1930 (age 95–96)

Sport
- Club: Bulli Bowling Club/Corrimal Bowling Club
Medal record
Representing Australia
World Outdoor Championships
Gold medal – first place	1977 Worthing	fours
Gold medal – first place	1977 Worthing	team
Gold medal – first place	1985 Melbourne	singles
Gold medal – first place	1985 Melbourne	pairs
Gold medal – first place	1985 Melbourne	team
Silver medal – second place	1988 Auckland	team
Asia Pacific Bowls Championships
Gold medal – first place	1985 Tweed Heads	singles
Silver medal – second place	1985 Tweed Heads	pairs

Merle Erica Richardson OAM (born 1930 in New South Wales) is a former international lawn bowls competitor for Australia.

== Bowls career ==
=== World Championships ===
Richardson won the fours and team event gold medals at the 1977 World Outdoor Bowls Championship in Worthing, England, the fours gold was with Dot Jenkinson, Connie Hicks and Lorna Lucas.

Eight years later she won three golds at the 1985 World Outdoor Bowls Championship in Melbourne, Australia. The golds were in the singles, the pairs with Fay Craig and the team event (Taylor Trophy).

=== Asia Pacific Championships ===
She won two medals at the Asia Pacific Bowls Championships including a gold medal in the 1985 singles at Tweed Heads, New South Wales.

=== Awards ===
Richardson was awarded the Medal of the Order of Australia for services to bowls in 1987. In 2011 she was inducted into Bowls Australia’s Hall of Fame.
