= Dave Duncalf =

Personal information
- Nationality: Canada
- Born: 2nd quarter 1934 Bucklow Rural District, England
- Died: 13 December 2003 (aged 69) Port Moody, British Columbia

Sport
- Club: Vancouver South LBC
Medal record
Representing Canada
Commonwealth Games
Silver medal – second place	1986 Edinburgh	fours

David Duncalf (1934–2003) was an English born, Canadian international lawn bowler.

== Bowls career ==
He won a silver medal in the fours at the 1986 Commonwealth Games in Edinburgh with Dan Milligan, Dave Brown and Dave Houtby.

He won five Canadian National championships and his wife Alice Duncalf won nine national championships.

== Personal life ==
He emigrated from England in 1953, married Alice in 1971 and was an estimator for a number of construction firms. In 1989 he played a major role in the reconstruction of the Empress Hotel.
