= Albert Barakeina =

Papua New Guinean lawn bowler

Personal information
- Nationality: Papua New Guinean
- Born: 3 September 1948 (age 77)
Medal record
Representing (Papua New Guinea)
Asia Pacific Bowls Championships
Bronze medal – third place	1995 Dunedin	pairs

Albert Barakeina (born 1948) is a former Papua New Guinea international lawn bowler.

== Bowls career ==
Barakeina has represented Papua New Guinea at the Commonwealth Games, in the pairs at the 1998 Commonwealth Games.

He won a bronze medal with Martin Seeto in the pairs, at the 1995 Asia Pacific Bowls Championships, in Dunedin.
