= Betty Glassey =

PNG international lawn bowler

Personal information
- Nationality: Papua New Guinea

Sport
- Sport: Lawn bowls
- Club: Lae BC; Boroko RSL BC
Medal record
Representing Papua New Guinea
World Outdoor Championships
Bronze medal – third place	1973 Wellington	pairs

Betty Glassey is a former Papua New Guinea international lawn bowler.

== Bowls career ==
She represented Papua New Guinea at the 1969 World Outdoor Bowls Championship which was the first women's championships.

Four years later she won the pairs bronze medal with Gladys Doyle at the 1973 World Outdoor Bowls Championship.
