= Bill Wain =

Australian lawn bowler

Personal information
- Nationality: Australian
Medal record
Representing (Australia)
Asia Pacific Bowls Championships
Gold medal – first place	1987 Lae	pairs
Bronze medal – third place	1987 Lae	fours

William Wain is a former Australian international lawn bowler.

== Bowls career ==
Wain was selected as part of the five man team by Australia for the 1988 World Outdoor Bowls Championship, which was held in Auckland, New Zealand.

He won a pairs gold medal (with Dennis Katunarich) and a fours bronze medal, at the 1987 Asia Pacific Bowls Championships, held in Lae, Papua New Guinea.
