= Dave Brown (bowls) =

Canadian lawn bowler

Personal information
- Nationality: Canadian
- Born: 23 January 1939 Coventry, England
- Died: 26 May 2007 (aged 68)
Medal record
Representing Canada
World Outdoor Championships
Silver medal – second place	1992 Worthing	fours
Commonwealth Games
Silver medal – second place	1986 Edinburgh	fours
Asia Pacific Bowls Championships
Bronze medal – third place	1991 Kowloon	triples
Gold medal – first place	1991 Kowloon	fours

David Gordon Brown (born 1939) was a Canadian international lawn bowler.

== Bowls career ==
Brown was born in Coventry, England and emigrated to Canada before winning a bronze medal in the fours at the 1992 World Outdoor Bowls Championship in Worthing.

He also won a silver medal in the fours at the 1986 Commonwealth Games in Edinburgh.

He won two medals at the 1991 Asia Pacific Bowls Championships, including a gold in the fours with Ronnie Jones, Dave Houtby and Bill Boettger, in Kowloon, Hong Kong.
