= Lawn bowls at the 2003 South Pacific Games =

Event at the 2003 South Pacific Games

- Location: Suva, Fiji
- Dates: 28 June to 12 July 2003

Lawn Bowls at the 2003 South Pacific Games was held from 28 June to 12 July 2003 in Suva, Fiji.

== Men's results ==
Event	Gold	Silver	Bronze
Singles	(Fiji)	(Tokelau)	(Cook Islands)
Pairs	(Fiji)	(Papua New Guinea)	(Cook Islands)
Triples	(Fiji)	(Samoa)	(Norfolk Island); Sid Cooper; Robert Turton; Phil Bilman
Fours	(Fiji)	(Norfolk Island); Sid Cooper; Robert Turton; Phil Bilman; Warren Cranston	(Samoa)

== Women's results ==
Event	Gold	Silver	Bronze
Singles	(Fiji); Litia Tikoisuva	(Papua New Guinea)	(Niue)
Pairs	(Samoa)	(Papua New Guinea)	(Fiji)
Triples	(Cook Islands)	(Papua New Guinea)	(Samoa)
Fours	(Fiji)	(Cook Islands)	(Papua New Guinea)

== See also ==
- Lawn bowls at the Pacific Games
