= Madge Allan =

English lawn bowler

Margaret Allan
Personal information
- Nickname: Madge
- Died: Carlisle, Cumbria, England
Medal record
Women's bowls
Representing England
Commonwealth Games
Bronze medal – third place	1986 Edinburgh	Women's fours

Madge Allan is a former English international lawn bowler.

== Bowls career ==
Allan won a bronze medal in the Women's fours at the 1986 Commonwealth Games in Edinburgh with Barbara Fuller, Brenda Atherton and Mary Price.
