= Hafod Thomas =

Welsh lawn bowler

Personal information
- Nationality: Welsh

Sport
- Club: Loughor BC (outdoor)
Medal record
Representing Wales
Commonwealth Games
| Gold medal – first place | 1986 Edinburgh | fours |

Hafod Thomas is a Welsh former international lawn bowler.

He won a gold medal in the fours at the 1986 Commonwealth Games in Edinburgh with Jim Morgan, Robert Weale and Will Thomas.

He played for the Loughor Bowls Club and was an international from 1980 until 1986 in addition to being the Welsh captain in 1986.
