= Connie Hicks =

Australian lawn bowls competitor

Personal information
- Nationality: Australia
- Born: 16 May 1924 Kondinin, Western Australia
- Died: 2 November 2011 (aged 87)

Sport
- Sport: Lawn bowls
- Club: Royal Park Bowls Club
Medal record
Representing Australia
World Outdoor Championships
Silver medal – second place	1969 Sydney	triples
Bronze medal – third place	1969 Sydney	fours
Silver medal – second place	1969 Sydney	team
Gold medal – first place	1977 Worthing	fours
Gold medal – first place	1977 Worthing	team

Connie Hicks (née Haigh) was an international lawn bowls competitor for Australia.

== Bowls career ==
=== World Championships ===
Hicks won two silver medals and a bronze medal at the 1969 World Outdoor Bowls Championship in Sydney. The silver medals came in the team event (Taylor Trophy) and the triples with Norma Massey and Mary Ormsby. The bronze was in the fours event with Pam Hart, Jean Turnbull and Ormsby.

Eight years later Hicks won the fours gold medal with Dot Jenkinson, Lorna Lucas and Merle Richardson, at the 1977 World Outdoor Bowls Championship in Worthing and the team event gold medal (the Taylor Trophy).

=== State ===
She played for the Royal Park Bowls Club in North Perth and won 10 State titles. Connie married fellow lawn bowler Charlie Hicks in 1944.
