= Roy McCune =

Northern Irish international lawn bowler

Personal information
- Nationality: British (Northern Irish)

Sport
- Sport: Lawn bowls
- Club: Limavady BC
Medal record
Representing Northern Ireland
Commonwealth Games
Bronze medal – third place	1986 Edinburgh	fours

Roy McCune is a former Irish international lawn bowler. and current Ireland team Manager.

== Bowls career ==
McCune represented the Northern Irish team at the 1986 Commonwealth Games in Edinburgh, Scotland, where he competed in the fours event, with Billie Montgomery, Ernie Parkinson and Willie Watson. He won a bronze medal.

In 2013 he was the Irish team manager.
