= Jenny Nicolle =

Guernsey bowls player

Personal information
- Nationality: Guernsey
Medal record
Women's bowls
Representing Guernsey
Commonwealth Games
Silver medal – second place	1986 Edinburgh	Women's pairs

Jenny Nicolle is a former international lawn bowler from Guernsey.

== Bowls career ==
Nicolle won a silver medal in the Women's pairs at the 1986 Commonwealth Games in Edinburgh with Marie Smith. She also competed in the singles at the 1994 Commonwealth Games. She retired from bowls in 1996.

== Personal life ==
She worked in the finance industry and is married to fellow international bowler Mike Smith and is a trustee for the Guernsey Charitable Trust.
