= Audrey Hefford =

Australian international lawn bowler

Personal information
- Born: Audrey Maxine Hefford; 1929 Cobdogla, Australia
- Died: 5 March 2014 (aged 85)
Medal record
Representing Australia
Commonwealth Games
Silver medal – second place	1986 Edinburgh	fours
Asia Pacific Bowls Championships
Bronze medal – third place	1989 Suva	singles
Gold medal – first place	1989 Suva	triples

Audrey Maxine Hefford (1929 – 5 March 2014) was an Australian international lawn bowler.

== Bowls career ==
Audrey was part of the fours team that won a silver medal at the 1986 Commonwealth Games in Edinburgh. Four years later she just missed out on a bronze medal in the singles at the 1990 Commonwealth Games.

She made her debut for Australia in 1983 and represented South Australia from 1975 to 1999. She was inducted into the Bowls Australia Hall of Fame.

She also won a gold and bronze medal at the 1989 Asia Pacific Bowls Championships in Suva, Fiji.
