= Clarice Power =

Australian international lawn bowler

Personal information
- Nationality: Australia

Sport
- Club: Victoria (state); Mooroopna GBC; Bundoora BC; Euroa BC
Medal record
Representing Australia
Commonwealth Games
Silver medal – second place	1986 Edinburgh	fours

Clarice Christina Power is an Australian former international lawn bowler.

She was part of the fours team that won a silver medal at the 1986 Commonwealth Games in Edinburgh.

In 2017, she was inducted into the Sports Hall of Fame and has won four state championships.
