= Ian Dickison =

New Zealand lawn and indoor bowler (born 1952)

Ian Dickison MBE
Personal information
- Nationality: New Zealander
- Born: 9 March 1952

Sport
- Sport: Lawn bowls
- Club: Kaikorai Bowling Club
Medal record
Representing New Zealand
Lawn bowls
World Outdoor Championships
Gold medal – first place	1988 Auckland	triples
Silver medal – second place	1988 Auckland	fours
Silver medal – second place	1988 Auckland	team
Commonwealth Games
Gold medal – first place	1986 Edinburgh	singles
Asia Pacific Bowls Championships
Silver medal – second place	1989 Suva	singles
Bronze medal – third place	1989 Suva	pairs

Ian Antony Dickison MBE (born 9 March 1952) is a New Zealand former lawn and indoor bowler.

== Bowls career ==
Dickison came to prominence after being selected ahead of Peter Belliss for the 1986 Commonwealth Games in Edinburgh, Scotland. The decision by the New Zealand selectors proved to be right when Dickison secured the gold medal, defeating Ian Schuback of Australia in the final.

Dickison then won the 1988 Outdoor World Championship triples gold medal with Morgan Moffat and Phil Skoglund.

He won two medals at the 1989 Asia Pacific Bowls Championships in Suva, Fiji.

Other achievements include winning the singles title at the New Zealand National Bowls Championships in 1985 and the pairs title in 1981 bowling for the Kaikorai Bowls Club.

== Honours and awards ==
In the 1988 Queen's Birthday Honours, Dickison was appointed a Member of the Order of the British Empire, for services to bowls, and in 1990 he was awarded the New Zealand 1990 Commemoration Medal. In 2013, he was an inaugural inductee into the Bowls New Zealand Hall of Fame.
