= Marion Stevens =

Personal information
- Nationality: Australia
- Born: 1943 (age 82–83) Hayes, Middlesex, England

Sport
- Club: Keysborough Bowling Club/Dandenong Bowling Club
Medal record
Representing Australia
World Outdoor Championships
Gold medal – first place	1988 Auckland	triples
Gold medal – first place	1988 Auckland	fours
Silver medal – second place	1988 Auckland	team
Commonwealth Games
Gold medal – first place	1990 Auckland	fours

Marion Stevens née Pepper, (born 1943) in Hayes, Middlesex, is a former international lawn and indoor bowls competitor for Australia.

Stevens emigrated to Australia in 1973 and played for the Keysborough Bowling Club before moving to the Dandenong Bowling Club. She won the triples and fours gold medal at the 1988 World Outdoor Bowls Championship in Auckland.

Stevens competed in the Commonwealth Games winning a gold medal in the women's fours at the 1990 Commonwealth Games, in Auckland. In 2003 she was appointed as national selector for Australia.
