= Elizabeth Christie (bowls) =

Scottish international lawn and indoor bowler

Personal information
- Nationality: Scotland
Medal record
Representing Scotland
World Outdoor Championships
Gold medal – first place	1985 Melbourne	fours

Elizabeth Christie is a former Scottish international lawn and indoor bowler.

She won a gold medal in the fours at the 1985 World Outdoor Bowls Championship in Melbourne with Frances Whyte, Sarah Gourlay and Annette Evans.
