= Willie Watson (bowls) =

Northern Irish international lawn bowler

Personal information
- Nationality: British (Northern Irish)

Sport
- Sport: Lawn bowls
- Club: Knock BC
Medal record
Representing Northern Ireland
Commonwealth Games
Bronze medal – third place	1982 Brisbane	fours
Bronze medal – third place	1986 Edinburgh	fours

William "Willie" Watson is a former Irish international lawn bowler who competed at three Commonwealth Games.

== Biography ==
Watson, a post office worker by profession, made his international debut in 1973. In 1977 Watson was Ireland's bowler of the year and he represented the Northern Irish team at the 1978 Commonwealth Games in Edmonton, Canada, where he competed in the fours event, with Willie Murray, Michael Dunlop, Jimmy Donnelly.

Four years later he won a bronze medal in the fours with Sammy Allen, Frank Campbell and John McCloughlin at the 1982 Commonwealth Games in Brisbane, Australia.

In 1986 he won another bronze medal in the fours at the 1986 Commonwealth Games in Edinburgh with Ernie Parkinson, Billie Montgomery and Roy McCune.
