= Ernie Parkinson =

Northern Irish international lawn bowler

Personal information
- Nationality: British (Northern Irish)

Sport
- Sport: Lawn and indoor bowls
- Club: Belmont Bowling Club
Medal record
Representing Northern Ireland
Commonwealth Games
Bronze medal – third place	1986 Edinburgh	fours
Representing combined Ireland
British Isles Championships
Gold medal – first place	1990	triples

Ernie Parkinson is a former international lawn bowler from Northern Ireland who competed at the Commonwealth Games.

== Biography ==
Parkinson represented the Northern Irish team at the 1986 Commonwealth Games in Edinburgh, Scotland, where he competed in the fours event, with Billie Montgomery, Willie Watson and Roy McCune and won a bronze medal.

Four years later he represented Northern Ireland in the pairs at the 1990 Commonwealth Games in Auckland, New Zealand.

He plays for the Belmont Bowling Club which he joined from the Ormeau Bowls Club.
