= Sara Sundelowitz =

Personal information
- Nationality: South Africa

Sport
- Sport: Lawn bowls
Medal record
lawn bowls
World Outdoor Championships
Gold medal – first place	1969 Sydney	triples
Gold medal – first place	1969 Sydney	fours
Gold medal – first place	1969 Sydney	team

Sara Sundelowitz is a former South African international lawn bowler.

== Bowls career ==
In 1969 she won three gold medal's in the triples, fours and overall team event at the 1969 World Outdoor Bowls Championship in Sydney, Australia. She also won a gold medal in the team event (Taylor Trophy).
