= Greeta Fahey =

Australian lawn bowls competitor (born 1930)

Personal information
- Nationality: Australian
- Born: 1930

Sport
- Club: Helensvale BC
Medal record
Representing Australia
World Outdoor Championships
| Gold medal – first place | 1988 Auckland | triples |
| Gold medal – first place | 1988 Auckland | fours |
| Silver medal – second place | 1988 Auckland | team |
Asia Pacific Bowls Championships
| Gold medal – first place | 1989 Suva | triples |
| Silver medal – second place | 1989 Suva | fours |

Greeta Marie Fahey (born 1930) is a former international lawn bowls competitor for Australia.

== Bowls career ==
She won the triples and fours gold medal at the 1988 World Outdoor Bowls Championship in Auckland.

She won two medals at the 1989 Asia Pacific Bowls Championships in Suva, Fiji.
