= Fay Craig =

Australian lawn bowls competitor

Personal information
- Nationality: Australian

Sport
- Club: NJC Bowling Club
Medal record
Representing Australia
World Outdoor Championships
Gold medal – first place	1985 Melbourne	pairs
Silver medal – second place	1985 Melbourne	fours
Gold medal – first place	1985 Melbourne	team
Asia Pacific Bowls Championships
Silver medal – second place	1985 Tweed Heads	pairs
Silver medal – second place	1985 Tweed Heads	fours

Fay Craig is a former international lawn bowls competitor for Australia.

== Bowls career ==
Craig won the pairs gold medal with Merle Richardson and the fours silver medal at the 1985 World Outdoor Bowls Championship in Melbourne, Australia.

She won two silver medals at the Asia Pacific Bowls Championships at Tweed Heads, New South Wales.

Craig was inducted into the Bowls Australia Hall of Fame.
