= Gladys Doyle =

Papua New Guinea international lawn bowler

Personal information
- Nationality: Papua New Guinea

Sport
- Sport: Lawn Bowls
- Club: South Townsville Bowling Club
Medal record
Women's Lawn bowls
Representing Papua New Guinea
World Outdoor Championships
Gold medal – first place	1969 Sydney	singles
Bronze medal – third place	1969 Sydney	triples
Bronze medal – third place	1973 Wellington	pairs

Gladys Doyle is a former Papua New Guinea international lawn bowler.

== Bowls career ==
In 1969 she won the singles gold medal and the triples bronze medal at the 1969 World Outdoor Bowls Championship in Sydney, Australia. Doyle won another bronze four years later during the 1973 World Outdoor Bowls Championship. She also won a bronze medal in the team event (Taylor Trophy) in 1969.

From 1955 to 1963 she was the South Townsville Bowling Club champion.
