= Mavis Meadowcroft =

Australian lawn bowls competitor

Personal information
- Nationality: Australia
- Born: 27 January 1926
- Died: 20 May 2008 (aged 82)
Medal record
Representing Australia
World Outdoor Championships
Gold medal – first place	1985 Melbourne	triples
Silver medal – second place	1985 Melbourne	fours
Gold medal – first place	1985 Melbourne	team

Mavis Edna Meadowcroft (1926-2008) was an international lawn bowls competitor for Australia.

She won the triples gold medal and fours silver medal at the 1985 World Outdoor Bowls Championship in Melbourne.

She was 14-time Stanhope club champion, was selected for the Victoria state side from 1966 to 1988, and was inducted into the Bowls Australia Hall of Fame in 2011.
