= Maria Gismondi =

Italian cross-country skier (born 2004)

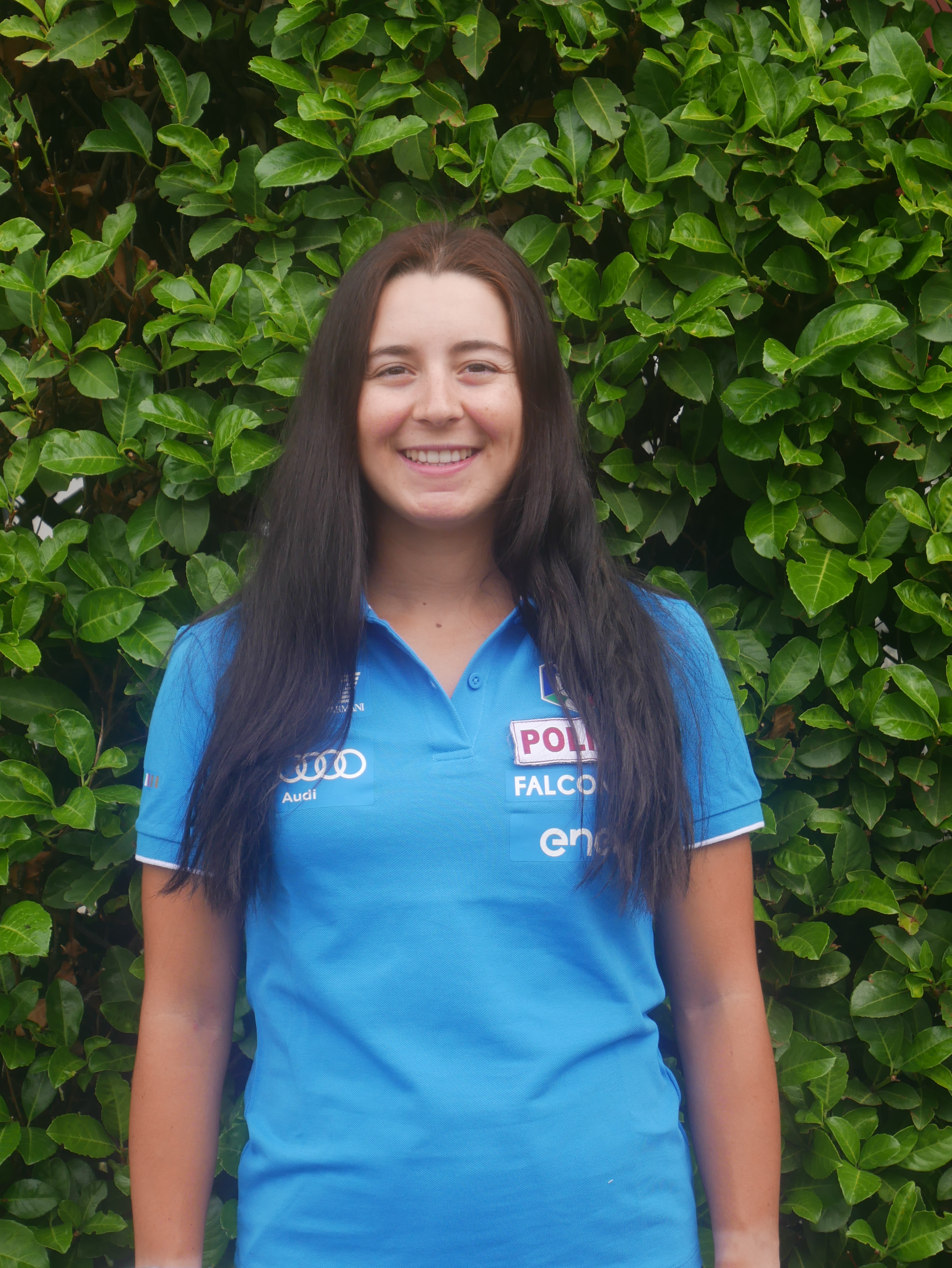
- Gismondi in 2025

Personal information
- Born: 13 June 2004 (age 22) Subiaco, Lazio, Italy

Sport
- Country: Italy
- Sport: Cross-country skiing

Maria Gismondi (born 13 June 2004) is an Italian cross-country skier. She competed in the 2026 Winter Olympics, as well as numerous FIS events.

== Skiathlon results ==
All results are sourced from the IOC.

=== Olympic Games ===
Year	Age	Individual	Skiathlon	Mass start	Sprint	Relay	Team sprint
2026	21	—	48	—	—	—	—
