= Violina Linda Pedro =

Lawn bowls player

Personal information
- Nationality: Tokelauan
- Born: c.1951/1952

Sport
- Sport: Lawn bowls
Medal record
Representing Tokelau
Pacific Games
Gold medal – first place	2007 Apia	Women's singles
Gold medal – first place	2007 Apia	Women's pairs

Violina Linda Pedro (born 1951 or 1952) is a bowls player from Tokelau.

== Bowls career ==
Pedro started to play lawn bowls in 1989. Lawn bowls is a very popular sport in the South Pacific region. At the 13th South Pacific Games on Samoa in 2007 she won the first ever gold medal in any international competition for her home country of Tokelau, as she won the women's pairs competition with her partner Opetera Samakia Ngatokov at the Lawn bowls at the 2007 South Pacific Games. She also won a gold medal in the women's singles competition.
