= Yetta Emanuel =

Personal information
- Nationality: South Africa

Sport
- Sport: Lawn bowls
Medal record
lawn bowls
World Outdoor Championships
| Gold medal – first place | 1969 Sydney | triples |
| Gold medal – first place | 1969 Sydney | fours |
| Gold medal – first place | 1969 Sydney | team |

Yetta Emanuel is a former South African international lawn bowler.

== Bowls career ==
In 1969 she won three gold medals in the triples, fours and overall team event at the 1969 World Outdoor Bowls Championship in Sydney, Australia.

She also won a gold medal in the team event (Taylor Trophy).
