= Trevor Morris (bowls) =

Australian lawn bowler

Personal information
- Nationality: Australian
- Born: 21 July 1956 (age 69) Cairns
Medal record
Representing Australia
Commonwealth Games
Gold medal – first place	1990 Auckland	pairs
Asia Pacific Bowls Championships
Gold medal – first place	1987 Lae	triples
Bronze medal – third place	1987 Lae	fours

Trevor Raymond Morris (born 1956) is a former Australian international lawn bowler.

== Bowls career ==
He won a gold medal in the pairs with Ian Schuback at the 1990 Commonwealth Games in Auckland.

He won two medals at the Asia Pacific Bowls Championships including a gold medal in the 1987 triples, in Lae, Papua New Guinea. In 1989, he won the Hong Kong International Bowls Classic pairs title.
