= Ronnie Jones (bowls) =

Canadian bowls player (1931–2022)

Personal information
- Nationality: Canadian
- Born: 1931 Liverpool, England
- Died: 2022 (aged 90–91)
- Height: 5 ft 2 in (157 cm)
Medal record
Representing Canada
World Outdoor Championships
Bronze medal – third place	1992 Worthing	pairs
Silver medal – second place	1992 Worthing	fours
Commonwealth Games
Silver medal – second place	1986 Edinburgh	pairs
Asia Pacific Bowls Championships
Gold medal – first place	1991 Kowloon	pairs
Gold medal – first place	1991 Kowloon	fours

Ronnie Jones (1931–2022) was a Canadian international lawn and indoor bowls player.

== Early life and bowls career ==
Jones was born in Liverpool, England and emigrated to Canada as a teenager in 1952. He made his debut for Canada in 1974.

Jones won a bronze medal in the pairs with Bill Boettger and a silver medal in the fours at the 1992 World Outdoor Bowls Championship in Worthing.

Jones also won a silver medal with Boettger in the pairs at the 1986 Commonwealth Games in Edinburgh.

Jones won two gold medals at the 1991 Asia Pacific Bowls Championships in the pairs and fours, in Kowloon, Hong Kong.

== Personal life and death ==
Ronnie Jones died in 2022.

His son is Kevin Jones.
