= Ramona Ash =

Cook Islands lawn bowler

Personal information
- Nationality: Cook Islander
Medal record
Representing (Cook Islands)
Asia Pacific Bowls Championships
Gold medal – first place	1987 Lae	Singles

Ramona Ash is a former Cook Islands international lawn bowler.

== Bowls career ==
Ash has represented the Cook Islands at the Commonwealth Games, in the fours at the 1994 Commonwealth Games.

She rose to prominence after winning the singles gold medal at the 1987 Asia Pacific Bowls Championships in Lae, Papua New Guinea.
