= Babs Anderson =

Botswanan lawn bowler

Flora 'Babs' Anderson
Personal information
- Nationality: Botswana
Medal record
Representing Botswana
Commonwealth Games
| Bronze medal – third place | 1986 Edinburgh | singles |

Flora 'Babs' Anderson is a former Motswana international lawn bowler.

In 1986 she won bronze medal in the singles at the 1986 Commonwealth Games in Edinburgh. She has represented Botswana at four consecutive Commonwealth Games from 1986 until 1998.

Flora started bowling in 1972 and won the national title on multiple occasions. She also represented Botswana at the first African Nations Tournament.

Her bronze medal in 1986 was the first Commonwealth Games medal to be won by Botswana.
