= Ram Shankar (bowls) =

Personal information
- Nationality: Fijian
- Born: 30 March 1938 (age 88)
Medal record
Representing (Fiji)
Asia Pacific Bowls Championships
Silver medal – second place	1995 Dunedin	fours

Ram Shankar (born 1938) is a former Fijian international lawn bowler.

== Bowls career ==
Shankar has represented Fiji at the Commonwealth Games, in the fours event at the 1998 Commonwealth Games.

He won a silver medal at the Asia Pacific Bowls Championships in the 1995 fours in Dunedin, New Zealand.

He was the Vice President of the Fiji Association of Sport and National Olympic Committee from 1997-2003.
