= Bill Boettger =

Canadian lawn bowls player

Personal information
- Nationality: Canadian
- Born: 1941 (age 84–85) Kitchener, Ontario
- Died: 2005
Medal record
Representing Canada
World Outdoor Championships
Bronze medal – third place	1992 Worthing	pairs
Silver medal – second place	1992 Worthing	fours
Commonwealth Games
Silver medal – second place	1986 Edinburgh	pairs
Asia Pacific Bowls Championships
Silver medal – second place	1989 Suva	triples
Bronze medal – third place	1989 Suva	fours
Gold medal – first place	1991 Kowloon	pairs
Gold medal – first place	1991 Kowloon	fours
Gold medal – first place	1993 Victoria	pairs

Bill Boettger (born 1941) is a Canadian former international lawn and indoor bowler.

== Biography ==
Boettger was a schoolteacher by trade and also commentated for Canadian television during televised events.

He won a bronze medal in the pairs with Ronnie Jones and a silver medal in the fours at the 1992 World Outdoor Bowls Championship in Worthing.

He also won a silver medal with Jones in the pairs at the 1986 Commonwealth Games in Edinburgh.

He won five medals at the Asia Pacific Bowls Championships including three gold medals.
