= Martin Seeto =

Papua New Guinean lawn bowler

Personal information
- Nationality: Papua New Guinean
- Born: 17 June 1962 (age 64)
Medal record
Representing (Papua New Guinea)
Asia Pacific Bowls Championships
Bronze medal – third place	1995 Dunedin	pairs

Martin Seeto (born 1962) is a former Papua New Guinea international lawn bowler.

== Bowls career ==
Seeto has represented Papua New Guinea at two Commonwealth Games; in the pairs at the 1998 Commonwealth Games and in the fours at the 1990 Commonwealth Games.

He won a bronze medal with Albert Barakeina in the pairs at the 1995 Asia Pacific Bowls Championships, in Dunedin.
