= Frances Whyte =

Scottish lawn bowler (1930–2003)

Personal information
- Nationality: British (Scottish)
- Born: 22 September 1930 Neilston, Scotland
- Died: 17 June 2003 (aged 72) Johnstone, Scotland

Sport
- Sport: Lawn and indoor bowls
- Club: Priorscroft BC
Medal record
Representing Scotland
World Outdoor Championships
Gold medal – first place	1985 Melbourne	fours
Gold medal – first place	1992 Ayr	triples
Gold medal – first place	1992 Ayr	fours
Gold medal – first place	1992 Ayr	team
Commonwealth Games
Gold medal – first place	1994 Victoria	pairs
Atlantic Bowls Championships
Gold medal – first place	1993 Florida	fours
Gold medal – first place	1995 Durban	fours

Janet Frances Margaret Whyte (née Crawford; 22 September 1930 – 17 June 2003) was a Scottish international lawn and indoor bowler who won world championship golds and competed at three Commonwealth Games.

== Biography ==
Janet Frances Margaret Crawford was born in Neilston, Scotland, on 22 September 1930. She won a gold medal in the fours at the 1985 World Outdoor Bowls Championship in Melbourne. Seven years later she won two more golds in both the triples and the fours at the 1992 World Outdoor Bowls Championship in Worthing.

She also competed at the Commonwealth Games in bowls events at the 1986 Commonwealth Games in Edinburgh, Scotland.

Whyte represented the Scottish team at the 1990 Commonwealth Games in Auckland, New Zealand, where she competed in the pairs event, with Sarah Gourlay.

In 1993 she won the fours gold medal at the inaugural Atlantic Bowls Championships.

A third Commonwealth Games appearance ensued in the bowl events at the 1994 Commonwealth Games..

One year later she repeated the Atlantic Bowls success winning the fours gold again in Durban.

Whyte died in Johnstone, Scotland, on 17 June 2003, aged 72.
