= Maggie Worri =

PNG international lawn bowler

Personal information
- Nationality: Papua New Guinean
Medal record
Representing Papua New Guinea
Asia Pacific Bowls Championships
Gold medal – first place	1987 Lae	triples

Maggie Worri is a former Papua New Guinea international lawn bowler.

== Bowls career ==
Worri won a triples gold medal at the Asia Pacific Bowls Championships in Lae, Papua New Guinea with Cunera Monalua and Laureen Griffiths.

She has represented Papua New Guinea at two Commonwealth Games; in the fours event at the 1990 Commonwealth Games and in the pairs event at the 2002 Commonwealth Games.
