= Linda Parker (bowls) =

Personal information
- Nationality: Wales
- Born: Malinda Florence Muriel Parker; 1925 Montgomeryshire, Wales
- Died: 26 December 2018 (aged 92–93) Powys, Wales

Sport
- Club: Knighton Ladies BC
Medal record
lawn bowls
World Outdoor Championships
Bronze medal – third place	1985 Melbourne	triples
Bronze medal – third place	1988 Auckland	fours
Commonwealth Games
Gold medal – first place	1986 Edinburgh	fours

Malinda Florence Muriel Parker, MBE (1925 – 26 December 2018) was a Welsh international lawn and indoor bowler. In 1985, Parker won a triples bronze medal at the 1985 World Outdoor Bowls Championship in Preston, Victoria, Melbourne, Australia with Rita Jones and Mair Jones. Three years later she won another bronze in the fours at the 1988 World Outdoor Bowls Championship at Auckland.

Parker was part of the fours team that won the gold medal at the 1986 Commonwealth Games in Edinburgh.

Parker made her International debut in 1970 and was a National Champion in 1972 and 1983. In 1980 she became President for the Welsh National Bowls Association, and she was awarded an MBE as part of the 2000 Birthday Honours. Parker died in Powys on 26 December 2018.
