= Jim Morgan (bowls) =

Welsh lawn bowler

Personal information
- Nationality: British (Welsh)
- Born: 29 January 1933
- Died: 13 January 2022 (aged 88)

Sport
- Sport: Lawn and indoor bowls
- Club: Barry Athletic BC (outdoor); Vale of Glamorgan (indoor)
Medal record
Representing Wales
Commonwealth Games
Bronze medal – third place	1978 Edmonton	pairs
Gold medal – first place	1986 Edinburgh	fours
British Isles Championships
Gold medal – first place	1964	fours

James Arthur Morgan (29 January 1933 – 13 January 2022) was a Welsh international lawn and indoor bowler.

== Bowls career ==
Morgan won a bronze medal in the pairs at the 1978 Commonwealth Games in Edmonton.

Eight years later won a gold medal in the fours at the 1986 Commonwealth Games in Edinburgh with Hafod Thomas, Robert Weale and Will Thomas.

In between he also played in the fours at the 1982 Commonwealth Games. He played for the Barry Athletic Bowling Club which he joined in 1961. he was a Welsh international from 1972-1988.

Morgan was a two times Welsh National Champion, winning the fours in 1963 and 1969 when bowling for the Barry Athletic Bowls Club. He also won the 1964 British Isles Bowls Championships fours title.

Between 1972 and 1988, Morgan earned 44 caps for the Welsh national outdoor team, which included captaincy in 1982. Indoors he earned 69 caps between 1968 and 1990 and was again captain of the team in 1979.

== Death ==
Morgan died on 13 January 2022, at the age of 88.
