= Kanny Vaile =

Cook Islands lawn bowler (1953–2019)

Personal information
- Born: 8 June 1953 Rarotonga, Cook Islands
- Died: 4 March 2019 (aged 65)

Sport
- Sport: Lawn bowls
- Club: Rarotonga BC
Medal record
Representing Cook Islands
Asia Pacific Bowls Championships
Bronze medal – third place	2007 Christchurch	triples

Mata Kanny Vaile (1953-2019) was an international lawn bowler from the Cook Islands.

== Bows career ==
Vaile won the bronze medal in the triples at Asia Pacific Bowls Championships in Christchurch.

She was selected to represent the Cook Islands at six Commonwealth Games. The fours in 1994 and 1998, the pairs in 2002 and 2006, the triples in 2010 and the triples and fours in 2014.

She died in 2019 and was buried at the family burial site in Tauae. She assisted her father in building the greens at the Rarotonga Bowling Club and won six gold medals and six bronze medals in National Championships.
