= Peter Fong =

Fijian lawn bowler (born 1941)

Personal information
- Nationality: Fijian
- Born: 1941 (age 84–85)

Sport
- Club: Suva BC/Tamavua BC/Rewa BC
Medal record
Representing (Fiji)
Asia Pacific Bowls Championships
Gold medal – first place	1985 Tweed Heads	singles
Bronze medal – third place	1985 Tweed Heads	triples

Peter Fong (born 1941) is a former Fijian international lawn bowler.

== Bowls career ==
Fong has represented Fiji at four Commonwealth Games. He competed in the fours event at the 1974 British Commonwealth Games, the fours event at the 1978 Commonwealth Games, the pairs event at the 1982 Commonwealth Games and the singles event at the 1986 Commonwealth Games.

He won the singles gold medal and the pairs bronze medal at the inaugural 1985 Asia Pacific Bowls Championships, in Tweed Heads, Australia and the 1991 triples in Kowloon, Hong Kong.

== Personal life ==
he was a marketing manager by trade and now bowls in Australia for the Merrylands Bowling Club and is the husband of female bowls international Willow Fong.
