= Maraia Lum On =

Fijian lawn bowler

Personal information
- Nationality: Fijian

Sport
- Club: Rewa Bowling Club
Medal record
Representing Fiji
World Outdoor Championships
Silver medal – second place	1981 Toronto	pairs
Silver medal – second place	1985 Melbourne	singles
Silver medal – second place	1985 Melbourne	pairs
Asia Pacific Bowls Championships
Gold medal – first place	1987 Lae	pairs
Gold medal – first place	1989 Suva	pairs
Silver medal – second place	1989 Suva	singles
Silver medal – second place	1991 Kowloon	pairs

Maraia Lum On is a former international lawn bowls competitor for Fiji.

== Bowls career ==
Lum On started bowling in 1976 and was the 1982 Fiji Sportswoman of the Year. She had been inducted into the Fiji Sports Hall of Fame and in 1986 was the joint flag bearer for Fiji at the opening ceremony of the Commonwealth Games in Edinburgh, Scotland.

Lum On won the pairs silver medal with Willow Fong at the 1981 World Outdoor Bowls Championship in Toronto, Canada and four years later won the singles and pairs silver medal at the 1985 World Outdoor Bowls Championship in Melbourne, Australia.

She won four medals at the Asia Pacific Bowls Championships including two gold medals in the 1987 pairs, in Lae, Papua New Guinea and the 1989 pairs in Suva, Fiji.
