= Tau Nancie =

Papua New Guinea international lawn bowler

Personal information
- Nationality: Papua New Guinean
Medal record
Representing (Papua New Guinea)
Asia Pacific Bowls Championships
Gold medal – first place	1987 Lae	fours

Tau Nancie is a former Papua New Guinea international lawn bowler.

== Bowls career ==
Nancie has represented Papua New Guinea at the Commonwealth Games in the fours at the 1990 Commonwealth Games.

He won a gold medal at the 1987 Asia Pacific Bowls Championships in the fours at Lae in his home country.
