= Alice Duncalf =

Canadian lawn bowler

Personal information
- Nationality: Canadian

Sport
- Club: Terminal City BC; Vancouver South BC
Medal record
Representing (Canada)
Asia Pacific Bowls Championships
Bronze medal – third place	1987 Lae	triples
Bronze medal – third place	1995 Dunedin	fours

Alice Duncalf is a former Canadian international lawn bowler.

== Bowls career ==
Duncalf has represented Canada at two Commonwealth Games at the 1986 Commonwealth Games and the 1994 Commonwealth Games.

She has won two medals at the Asia Pacific Bowls Championships.

She is a nine times Canadian champion and nine times Vancouver & District singles champion.

== Personal life ==
Her husband was Dave Duncalf.
