= Willow Fong =

Fijian-Australian lawn bowler

Personal information
- Nationality: Fijian & Australian

Sport
- Club: Rewa / Merrylands Bowling Club
Medal record
Representing Fiji
World Outdoor Championships
Silver medal – second place	1981 Toronto	pairs
Silver medal – second place	1985 Melbourne	pairs
Asia Pacific Bowls Championships
Bronze medal – third place	1985 Tweed Heads	pairs
Bronze medal – third place	1985 Tweed Heads	fours
Gold medal – first place	1987 Lae	pairs
Gold medal – first place	1987 Lae	fours
Bronze medal – third place	1989 Suva	triples
Bronze medal – third place	1989 Suva	fours
Representing Australia
World Outdoor Championships
Bronze medal – third place	2000 Moama	triples
Bronze medal – third place	2000 Moama	fours
Silver medal – second place	2000 Moama	team
Commonwealth Games
Bronze medal – third place	1998 Kuala Lumpur	pairs
Asia Pacific Bowls Championships
Gold medal – first place	1997 Warilla	triples
Gold medal – first place	1997 Warilla	fours
Gold medal – first place	1999 Kuala Lumpur	pairs

Willow Fong is a Tongan born, former international lawn bowls competitor for Fiji and Australia.

== Biography ==
Fong is originally from Tonga and started bowling in 1974.

Fong won the pairs silver medal with Maraia Lum On at the 1981 World Outdoor Bowls Championship in Toronto, Canada and four years later won the pairs silver medal again at the 1985 World Outdoor Bowls Championship in Melbourne, Australia. In 1998 she represented Australia at the Commonwealth Games and won a bronze medal in the pairs with Gordana Baric.

She was the joint flag bearer for Fiji at the opening ceremony of the 1986 Commonwealth Games in Edinburgh, Scotland.

She has won nine medals at the Asia Pacific Bowls Championships including five gold medals.

She now bowls in Australia for the Merrylands Bowling Club and is the wife of male bowls international Peter Fong.
