= World Bowls Championship =

Premier world bowls competition between national bowls organisations

Tournament information
- Sport: Lawn bowls
- Location: Various
- Established: 1966 (men); 1969 (women)
- Administrator: World Bowls
- Website: World Bowls

The World Bowls Championship is the premier world bowls competition between national bowls organisations.

== World Outdoor Championships ==
First held in Australia in 1966, the World Outdoor Bowls Championships for men and women are held every four years. From 2008 the men's and women's events were held together. Qualifying national bowls organisations (usually countries) are represented by a team of five players, who play once as a single and a four, then again as a pair and a triple. Gold, silver, and bronze medals are awarded in each of the four disciplines, and there is also a trophy for the best overall team — the Leonard Trophy for men and the Taylor Trophy for women. Northern Ireland & the Republic of Ireland compete as one combined Irish team.

The 2020 event was postponed twice and scheduled for 2021 due to the COVID-19 pandemic. However following continual issues surrounding the pandemic the Championships were officially cancelled on 9 March 2021. Furthermore, it was decided that the World Championships would take place every two years starting in 2023. This also resulted in the fact that qualifying events for the Championships were no longer required meaning the Atlantic Bowls Championships and Asia Pacific Championships were terminated.

The 2027 World Bowls Championship will be hosted in England for the for time in over 20 years at Victoria Park (home to the Birmingham 2022 Commonwealth Games), Royal Leamington Spa, from 20 July to 1 August. The last time it was held in England, the Men's and Women's competitions were held separately. The Men's competition was hosted in Worthing, England, in 1992 and the Women's competition was last hosted in England in 2004, Royal Leamington Spa. Commonwealth Games medal winner, Amy Monkhouse (now Amy Pharaoh), competed in the competition in 2004 and secured Women's Fours Gold. She went on to secure the same gold in the 2023 World Bowls Championships, Gold Coast, Australia.

=== Men's titles ===
Year	Venue	Singles Gold	Pairs Gold *	Triples Gold *	Fours Gold *	Team Champion
1966	Sydney, Australia	(England); David Bryant	(Australia); Geoff Kelly, Bert Palm	(Australia); John Dobbie, Athol Johnston, Don Collins	(New Zealand); Bill O'Neill, Gordon Jolly, Ron Buchan, Norm Lash	Australia
1972	Worthing, England	(Wales); Maldwyn Evans	(Hong Kong); Eric Liddell, Saco Delgado	(United States); Dick Folkins, Clive Forrester, Bill Miller	(England); Peter Line, Ted Hayward; Cliff Stroud, Norman King	Scotland
1976	Johannesburg, South Africa	(South Africa); Doug Watson	(South Africa); Bill Moseley, Doug Watson	(South Africa); Kevin Campbell, Nando Gatti, Kelvin Lightfoot	(South Africa); Kevin Campbell, Bill Moseley, Nando Gatti, Kelvin Lightfoot	South Africa
1980	Melbourne, Australia	(England); David Bryant	(Australia); Peter Rheuben, Alf Sandercock	(England); David Bryant, Tony Allcock, Jimmy Hobday	(Hong Kong); Omar Dallah, Eric Liddell, George Souza, Philip Chok	England
1984	Aberdeen, Scotland	(New Zealand); Peter Belliss	(United States); Skippy Arculli, Jim Candelet, George Adrain *	Jim Baker, Sammy Allen, Stan Espie	(England); Tony Allcock, John Bell; Julian Haines, George Turley	Scotland
1988	Auckland, New Zealand	(England); David Bryant	(New Zealand); Peter Belliss, Rowan Brassey	(New Zealand); Phil Skoglund, Morgan Moffat, Ian Dickison	Jim Baker, Sammy Allen, John McCloughlin, Rodney McCutcheon	England
1992	Worthing, England	(England); Tony Allcock	(Scotland); Alex Marshall, Richard Corsie	(Israel); Cecil Bransky, Lawrence Mendelsohn, Leon Bluhm	(Scotland); Angus Blair, Willie Wood, Alex Marshall, Graham Robertson	Scotland
1996	Adelaide, Australia	(England); Tony Allcock	Sammy Allen, Jeremy Henry	(Scotland); George Adrain, Willie Wood, Kenny Logan	(England); John Bell, Andy Thomson, David Cutler, Brett Morley	Scotland
2000	Johannesburg, South Africa	Jeremy Henry	(Scotland); Alex Marshall, George Sneddon	(New Zealand); Peter Belliss, Rowan Brassey, Andrew Curtain	(Wales); Will Thomas, Robert Weale, Stephen Rees, Mark Williams	Australia
2004	Ayr, Scotland	(Australia); Steve Glasson	(Canada); Ryan Bester, Keith Roney	(Scotland); David Peacock, Willie Wood, Jim McIntyre	Jim Baker, Neil Booth, Noel Graham, Jonathan Ross	Scotland
2008	Christchurch, New Zealand	(Malaysia); Safuan Said	(New Zealand); Gary Lawson, Russell Meyer	(Scotland); David Peacock, Willie Wood, Wayne Hogg	(New Zealand); Gary Lawson, Russell Meyer, Richard Girvan, Andrew Todd	New Zealand
2012	Adelaide, Australia	(Australia); Leif Selby	(Scotland); Alex Marshall, Paul Foster	(Scotland); Graeme Archer, Darren Burnett, David Peacock	(Australia); Aron Sherriff, Mark Casey, Brett Wilkie, Wayne Ruediger	Australia
2016	Christchurch, New Zealand	(New Zealand); Shannon McIlroy	(Australia); Aaron Wilson, Brett Wilkie	(England); Robert Paxton, Andy Knapper, Jamie Walker	(New Zealand); Ali Forsyth, Blake Signal, Mike Kernaghan, Mike Nagy	New Zealand
2020	Gold Coast, Australia	cancelled due to COVID-19				
2023	Gold Coast, Australia	(Canada); Ryan Bester	Gary Kelly, Adam McKeown	(Australia); Carl Healey, Aron Sherriff, Corey Wedlock	(Australia); Aron Sherriff, Carl Healey; Aaron Teys, Corey Wedlock	Australia
2027	TBA					

* Jim Candelet was taken ill during the pool stages and had to withdraw from the championships. As the USA did not have an available substitute the organisers allowed George Adrain, a reserve with the Scottish team, to take his place for the rest of the tournament.

=== Women's titles ===
Year	Venue	Singles Gold	Pairs Gold	Triples Gold	Fours Gold	Team Champion
1969	Sydney, Australia	(Papua New Guinea); Gladys Doyle	(South Africa); May Cridlan, Elsie McDonald	(South Africa); Kathy Bidwell, Yetta Emanuel, Sara Sundelowitz	(South Africa); May Cridlan, Kathy Bidwell, Yetta Emanuel, Sara Sundelowitz	South Africa
1973	Wellington, New Zealand	(New Zealand); Elsie Wilkie	(Australia); Dot Jenkinson, Lorna Lucas	(New Zealand); Cis Winstanley, Noeleen Scott, Irene Foote	(New Zealand); Cis Winstanley, Verna Devlin, Noeleen Scott, Irene Foote	New Zealand
1977	Worthing, England	(New Zealand); Elsie Wilkie	(Hong Kong); Helen Wong, Elvie Chok	(Wales); Enid Morgan, Margaret Pomeroy, Joan Osborne	(Australia); Merle Richardson, Lorna Lucas, Connie Hicks, Dot Jenkinson	Australia
1981	Toronto, Canada	(England); Norma Shaw	Nan Allely, Eileen Bell	(Hong Kong); Lena Sadick, Rae O'Donnell, Linda King	(England); Eileen Fletcher, Gloria Thomas, Mavis Steele; Betty Stubbings, Irene Molyneux*	England
1985	Melbourne, Australia	(Australia); Merle Richardson	(Australia); Merle Richardson, Fay Craig	(Australia); Mavis Meadowcroft, Norma Massey, Dorothy Roche	(Scotland); Frances Whyte, Annette Evans, Elizabeth Christie, Sarah Gourlay	Australia
1988	Auckland, New Zealand	(Wales); Janet Ackland	Margaret Johnston, Phillis Nolan	(Australia); Dorothy Roche, Marion Stevens, Greeta Fahey	(Australia); Dorothy Roche, Norma Wainwright, Marion Stevens, Greeta Fahey	England
1992	Ayr, Scotland	Margaret Johnston	Margaret Johnston, Phillis Nolan	(Scotland); Frances Whyte, Janice Maxwell, Joyce Lindores	(Scotland); Senga McCrone, Frances Whyte, Janice Maxwell, Joyce Lindores	Scotland
1996	Leamington Spa, England	(Norfolk Island); Carmen Anderson	Margaret Johnston, Phillis Nolan	(South Africa); Hester Bekker, Barbara Redshaw, Jannie de Beer	(Australia); Daphne Shaw, Margaret Sumner, Marilyn Peddell, Gordana Baric	South Africa
2000	Moama, Australia	Margaret Johnston	(Scotland); Joyce Lindores, Margaret Letham	(New Zealand); Anne Lomas, Sharon Sims, Patsy Jorgensen	(New Zealand); Anne Lomas, Sharon Sims, Patsy Jorgensen, Jan Khan	England
2004	Leamington Spa, England	Margaret Johnston	(New Zealand); Jo Edwards, Sharon Sims	(South Africa); Loraine Victor, Jill Hackland, Trish Steyn	(England); Amy Monkhouse, Jean Baker, Ellen Falkner, Jayne Christie	England
2008	Christchurch, New Zealand	(New Zealand); Val Smith	(New Zealand); Jo Edwards, Val Smith	(South Africa); Lorna Trigwell, Loraine Victor, Sylvia Burns	(Australia); Karen Murphy, Claire Duke, Julie Keegan, Lynsey Clarke	Australia
2012	Adelaide, Australia	(Australia); Karen Murphy	(Australia); Rebecca Van Asch, Kelsey Cottrell	(Australia); Karen Murphy, Lynsey Clarke, Natasha Scott	(Scotland); Margaret Letham, Caroline Brown, Lynn Stein, Michelle Cooper	Australia
2016	Christchurch, New Zealand	(Australia); Karen Murphy	(Wales); Jess Sims, Laura Daniels	(Australia); Rebecca Van Asch, Natasha Scott, Carla Krizanic	(Australia); Natasha Scott, Rebecca Van Asch, Carla Krizanic, Kelsey Cottrell	Australia
2020	Gold Coast, Australia	cancelled due to COVID-19				
2023	Gold Coast, Australia	(New Zealand); Tayla Bruce	(Malaysia); Ain Nabilah Tarmizi, Aleena Nawawi	(Australia); Kelsey Cottrell, Lynsey Clarke, Dawn Hayman	(England); Amy Pharaoh, Lorraine Kuhler, Jamie-Lea Marshall, Sophie Tolchard	New Zealand
2027	tba					

* Irene Molyneux played in the 1981 Fours & Pairs as an injury replacement helping England to the Fours Gold medal.

=== Summary ===
Nation	Men						Women						Total
Nation	Singles	Pairs	Triples	Fours	Team	Total	Singles	Pairs	Triples	Fours	Team	Total	Total
Australia	2	3	2	2	4	13	3	3	5	4	5	20	33
New Zealand	2	2	2	3	2	11	4	2	2	2	2	12	23
Scotland	-	3	4	1	5	13	-	1	1	3	1	6	19
England	5	-	2	2	2	11	1	-	-	3	4	8	19
South Africa	1	1	1	1	1	5	-	1	4	1	2	8	13
Ireland	1	2	1	2	-	6	3	4	-	-	-	7	13
Wales	1	-	-	1	-	2	1	1	1	-	-	3	5
Hong Kong	-	1	-	1	-	2	-	1	1	-	-	2	4
Canada	1	1	-	-	-	2	-	-	-	-	-	-	2
USA	-	1	1	-	-	2	-	-	-	-	-	-	2
Malaysia	1	-	-	-	-	1	-	1	-	-	-	1	2
Papua New Guinea	-	-	-	-	-	-	1	-	-	-	-	1	1
Norfolk Island	-	-	-	-	-	-	1	-	-	-	-	1	1
Israel	-	-	-	1	-	1	-	-	-	-	-	-	1

=== Para Bowls Titles ===
Year	Venue	Para Pairs Men Gold	Para Pairs Women Gold	Visually Impaired Mixed Pairs Gold
2023	Gold Coast, Australia	(Australia); James Reynolds, Damien Delgado	(New Zealand); Teri Blackbourn, Julie O'Connell	(Australia); Jake Fehlberg, Jackie Hudson

== See also ==
- World Bowls Events
