= Bowls England National Championships (women's pairs) =

British lawn bowls event

The women's pairs is one of the events at the annual Bowls England National Championships.

== Venues ==
- 1932–1933 (Blackheath & Greenwich Club)
- 1934–1934 (Balham Constitutional Bowls Club)
- 1935–1936 (Pitshanger Park, Ealing)
- 1937–1974 (Wimbledon Park)
- 1975–present (Victoria Park, Royal Leamington Spa)

== Sponsors ==
- 1981–1985 (Lombard)
- 1986–1993 (Liverpool Victoria)
- 1994–1996 (Double Century Sherry)
- 2000, 2002–2004 (National Express)
- 2001–2001 (Steradent)
- 2023–2025 (Aviva)

== Past winners ==
Year	Champion	Club	County	Runner-up	Club	County	Ref
1932	Mrs Roberts & Mrs Craxford	Southgate	Middlesex	&			
1933	Mrs E. M. Privett & Ethel Tigg	Waddon Residents	Surrey	Mrs Fry & Clara Johns	Cavendish Eastbourne	Sussex	
1934	Mrs E. M. Privett & Ethel Tigg	Waddon Residents	Surrey	Miss Meill & Mrs Woodcock	Southbourne	Sussex	
1935	Mrs Hopwell & Mrs Palmer	Hilly Fields	Kent	Violet Howard & Mrs M E Quick	Newton Abbot	Devon	
1936	Mrs Merralls & Mrs Hallett	Tunbridge Wells	Kent	Mrs Batsford & Mrs Shewan	Temple Fortune	Middlesex	
1937	Louisa King & Mrs E. M. Privett	Waddon Residents	Surrey	Violet Howard & Mrs M E Quick	Newton Abbot	Devon	
1938	Violet Howard & Mrs M E Quick	Newton Abbot	Devon	Mrs Batsford & Mrs Shewan	Temple Fortune	Middlesex	
1939	Mrs Graham & Madge Haynes	Rosehill	Surrey	Mrs Thornberry & Mrs Cordell	New Milton	Hampshire	
1940–1945 No competition due to war
1946	Mrs C. D. Franklin & Mrs Mew	Motspur Park	Surrey	Mrs W. Harris & Mrs J. Barnwell	Bilton Road	Warwicks	
1947	Mrs Monkcom & Mrs Stoat	Ilford	Essex	Mrs F.J. Pearce & Mrs C. Read	Lymington	Hampshire	
1948	Mrs E. Joyes & Mrs D. Coleman	Sheen	Surrey	Mrs Chamberlain & Mrs Reeves	White Hall	Essex	
1949	Winnie Winslow & Gladys Holmes	Salisbury	Wiltshire	Mrs Horne & Mrs Houghton	Southampton	Hampshire	
1950	Mrs F. N. Dickinson & Mrs A. Broughton	Sidmouth	Devon	Mrs Crawford & Mrs Bell	Horden Welfare	Durham	
1951	Mrs C. Gipson & Louisa Coxall	Sittingbourne	Kent	Mrs D. Coleman & Mrs E. Joyes	Sheen	Surrey	
1952	Olive Tomblin & Mrs M. Bannister	Racecourse Northampton	Northants	Maude Ford & Ellen Whyte-Rickard	Moorsdown	Hants	
1953	Marjorie Colley & Joan Colley	Torbay	Devon	Elsie Baldwin & Florence Smith	Avenue Leamington	Warwicks	
1954	Winnie Winslow & Gladys Holmes	Salisbury	Wiltshire	Elsie Cornish & Mable Damon	Strawberry Hill	Middlesex	
1955	Kathleen McDowall & Mrs Hallatt	Redland	Gloucs	Ada Casewell & Annie Beath	Zetland Park	Yorks	
1956	Mrs R. Evans & Mrs L. Johnson	Folkestone Park	Kent	Mrs F Turner & Miss R Mattock	Nailsworth	Gloucs	
1957	Mrs M D Munn & Mrs H R Gibson	Loxford	Essex	Mrs B Herbert & Mrs E Clarke	Oadby	Leics	
1958	Mrs M Goodman & E Youldon	Tavistock, Sir Francis Drake	Devon	Mrs A Welshman & R M B Robertson	Muswell Hill	Middlesex	
1959	Dorothy Winterburn & Lena Careswell	Hornsey	Middlesex	Molly Butters & Peggy Spowart	Cowpen & Crofton	Northumberland	
1960	Lilian Bufton & Minnie Powell	Tally Ho	Warwicks	Monica Astle & Doreen Clark	Lakeside	Notts	
1961	Jess Freeman & Ethel Wilson	Kettering	Northants	Mrs C Bloomfield & K Hassell	Scunthorpe	Lincs	
1962	Mrs F A Morgan & V C Boyle	Hastings & St Leonards	Sussex	Mrs V Broome & M Noyes	Island Bohemian	Berks	
1963	Mrs L Stewart & K Fairbairn	Banister Park	Hampshire	Mrs A Turnbull & M Wainwright	Beech Park	Surrey	
1964	Violet Stevens & Mavis Steele	Watling	Middlesex	Ivy Kelly & Winnie Hollow	Newton Abbott	Devon	
1965	Eleanor Routledge & Lily Wise	Silloth	Cumberland	Winifred Smith & Daphne Leese	Pymm	Middlesex	
1966	Helen O'Donnell & Phyllis Derrick	Magdalen Park	Surrey	Phyllis Angove & Edith Ferry	Newquay	Cornwall	
1967	Mrs F Lewis & M Pickvance	Sun	Herts	Ada Watson & Margaret Morrison	West Bridgford	Notts	
1968	Mrs R. Crutchley & Mrs I. Oliver	Danson Park	Kent	Mrs H. Welch & Mrs E. Bridgewater	Zetland Park	Yorkshire	
1969	Mrs D Barclay & F E Jarvis	Northdown	Kent	Mrs E Knight & M Rice	Peterborough	Northants	
1970	Mrs B Tregonning & Daphne Leese	Hornsey	Middlesex	Mrs E Carter & D Lower	Hurstpierpoint	Sussex	
1971	Mary Bartlett & Mavis Steele	Watling	Middlesex	Mrs R Hanger & A Wright	Kettering Services	Northants	
1972	Mrs M Light & L Parkhurst		Hampshire	Helen O'Donnell & Phyllis Derrick	Magdalen Park	Surrey	
1973	Betty Norbury & Ivy Burns	Avenue	Warwicks	Mrs H Garner & T Barton	South Norwood	Surrey	
1974	Mrs P Mortimer & Winnie Hollow	Newton Abbot	Devon	Mrs D Sands & Esther Stanberry	Spalding Castle	Lincolnshire	
1975	Joan Hunt & Betty Taylor	Atherley	Hampshire	Alice Bates & Jean Allcock	Goodwood	Leicestershire	
1976	Margaret Lockwood & Irene Molyneux	Oxford City & County	Oxfordshire	Jean Valls & Chris Wessier	Raynes Park	Surrey	
1977	Evelyn Scorer & Ethel Rutherford	Whitley	Northumberland	Elsie Clempson & Peggy Nash	Wendover	Bucks	
1978	Anne Pascoe & Gloria Thomas	Helston	Cornwall	Wynne Anderson & Joan Sparkes	Central Park	Essex	
1979	Anita Kaye & Alice Steventon	Torbay	Devon	Mrs B Hall & G Lamb	Edmonton	Middlesex	
1980	Mary Burnett & Norma Shaw	Stockton	Durham	Doris Etchells & Margaret Allan	Courtfield Carlisle	Cumbria	
1981	Sophia Simmons & Iris Smith	Watford	Herts	Mary Pepper & Joan Curtis	Yatton	Somerset	
1982	Chris Wessier & Jean Valls	Raynes Park	Surrey	Wendy Clarke & Enid Fairhall	Southampton	Hampshire	
1983	Chris Wessier & Jean Valls	Raynes Park	Surrey	Sally Batchelor & Kathy Coles	Falcon Chelmsford	Essex	
1984	Anne Pascoe & Eileen Perrett	Plymouth Hoe	Devon	Pam Davies & Joy Adamson	Croydon	Surrey	
1985	Dorothy Lewis & Pip Green	Oadby	Leicestershire	Vera Booth & Maureen Timms	Whitnash	Warwickshire	
1986	Freda Brown & Gladys Lye	Townsend	Herts	Mary Brill & Sheila Jones	Bridport	Dorset	
1987	Pamela Hood & Betty Annison	Norwich	Norfolk	Betty Johnson & Norma Shaw	Stockton	Durham	
1988	Margaret Elliott & Mavis Wellington	Kingsbridge	Devon	Sylvia Francis & Mary Atkinson	Broomfield	Middlesex	
1989	Betty Johnson & Norma Shaw	Stockton	Durham	Hilary Cooke & Jean Pindar	Springfield Park	Yorkshire	
1990	Maureen Christmas & Jenny Tunbridge	Chesterton	Cambridgeshire	Margaret Bonsor & Jean Baker	Alfreton	Derbyshire	
1991	Dora Farman & Joan Campbell	Tonbridge	Kent	Jackie Turner & Brenda Atherton	Carlton Conway	Notts	
1992	Joyce Morgan & June Larter	Chesterton	Cambridgeshire	Anita de-Meza & Jan Stern	Harrow	Middlesex	
1993	June Boosey & Kay Havord	Hatfield	Herts	Ann Dennis & Carol Branchett	Milton Regis	Kent	
1994	Joan Carpenter & Rhona Darling	Portsmouth	Hants	Mabel Hodge & Jan Stern	Northolt	Middlesex	
1995	Norma Beales & Mary Price	Burnham	Bucks	Jenny Moore & Wendy Barnard	Brixham	Devon	
1996	Gail Fitzgerald & Audrey Moore	Haynes Park Hornchurch	Essex	Sheila Jones & Sue Hawkesworth	Bridport	Dorset	
1997	Ann Beale & Carol Duckworth	Braintree	Essex	Deborah Healey & Sharon Rickman	Raynes Park	Surrey	
1998	Maureen Monkton & Edna Bessell	Yeovil	Somerset	Helen Tuohy & Pat Launders	Shepherd's Bush	Middlesex	
1999	Jean Morris & Jill Edson	Park	Lincolnshire	Pam Davis & Joy Adamson	Croydon	Essex	
2000	Pauline Morgan & Sue Lagdon	Minehead	Somerset	Mary Taylor & Kay Kerley	Oakley	Hampshire	
2001	Audrey Stephens & Chris Grigg	Bournvill	Warwickshire	Rosemary Spetch & Wendy Hardy	Poole Park	Dorset	
2002	Linda Smith & Tracy Powell	Leominster	Herefordshire	Brenda Brown & Liz Tunn	Colchester	Essex	
2003	Jennie Groves & Jane Baxter-Avison	Arnold Park	Nottinghamshire	Kim Smith & Pat McCumiskey	Purley Bury	Surrey	
2004	Jean Simmons & Maureen Tims	Leamington Spa	Warwickshire	Ann Parker & Sylvia Offler	Forest Oaks	Nottinghamshire	
2005	Sarah Newsom & Catherine Popple	Peterborough	Huntingdonshire	Wendy King & Sandy Hazell	Milton Regis	Kent	
2006	Val Osmond & Sue Latham	Ardagh	Gloucestershire	Linda Smith & Tracy Powell	Leominster	Herefordshire	
2007	Sue Alexander & Ellen Falkner	City of Ely	Cambridgeshire	Jane Baldwin & Michelle Barlow	St Ives	Huntingdonshire	
2008	Sue Alexander & Ellen Falkner	City of Ely	Cambridgeshire	Ruth Rogers & Natalie Melmore	Kings Torquay	Devon	
2009	Lynne Bowen & Jean Baker	Blackwell	Derbyshire	Rosemary Addison & Jayne Christie	St Neots	Cambridgeshire	
2010	Oriole Hocking & Sandra Parker	Silloth	Cumbria	Sharon Kitchener & Sally Butcher	Felixstowe & Suffolk	Suffolk	
2011	Christine Gowshall & Amy Gowshall	Cleethorpes	Lincolnshire	Hannah Overton & Michelle Barlow	Whittlesey Manor	Huntingdonshire	
2012	Sue Alexander & Ellen Falkner	St Neots	Cambridgeshire	Katherine Rednall & Margaret Insley	Felixstowe & Suffolk	Suffolk	
2013	Rosemary Corney & Brenda Plumpton	Alton Social	Hampshire	Lynne Bowen & Sue Davies	Broadway	Worcestershire	
2014	Lynda Smith & Tracey Powell	Leominster	Herefordshire	Sophie Tolchard & Natalie Melmore	Kings Torquay	Devon	
2015	Donna Knight & Katherine Hawes	Oxford City & County	Oxfordshire	Linda Churchman & Cheryl Salisbury	Littleport	Cambridgeshire	
2016	Sophie Tolchard & Natalie Chestney	Kings Torquay	Devon	Cassidy Lenton & Harriet Stevens	Kings Torquay	Devon	
2017	Sue Alexander & Ellen Falkner	Littleport	Cambridgeshire	Sue Cooke & Alex Jacobs	Box	Wiltshire	
2018	Suzanne Cotton & Diana Jones	Kingston	Yorkshire	Hazel Marke & Margaret Holden	Alton Social	Hampshire	
2019	Sheila Plaskitt & Penny Strong	Dunholme	Lincolnshire	Emma Cooper & Natalie Chestney	Kings Torquay	Devon	
2020 No competition due to COVID-19 pandemic							
2021	Katy Smith & Lucy Smith	Westlecot	Wiltshire	Margaret Smith & Sharmishta Patel	Sutton	Surrey	
2022	Sophie Tolchard & Harriet Stevens	Kings Torquay	Devon	Tracey Johnson & Joanne Rowe	Borough of Eye	Suffolk	
2023	Carol Gaskins & Donna Grant	Oxford City & County	Oxfordshire	Gill Grantham & Alison Spreadborough	Sir Francis Drake	Devon	
2024	Katherine Hawes-Watts & Lorraine Kuhler	Oxford City & County	Oxon	Caroline Cullum & Amy Pharaoh	Cleethorpes	Lincs	
2025	Caroline Cullum & Amy Pharaoh	Cleethorpes	Lincs	Lauren Selway & Emma Cooper	Kings	Devon	
2026	Jorja Jackson, Michelle Coleman	Brampton	Hunts	Rachel Forster & Vicky Cook	Workington	Cumbria	
