= Bowls England National Championships (women's triples) =

British lawn bowls event

The women's triples is one of the events at the annual Bowls England National Championships.

== Venues ==
- 1933 (Blackheath & Greenwich Club)
- 1934–1934 (Balham Constitutional Bowls Club)
- 1935–1936 (Pitshanger Park, Ealing)
- 1937–1974 (Wimbledon Park)
- 1975–present (Victoria Park, Royal Leamington Spa)

== Sponsors ==
- 1981–1985 (Lombard)
- 1986–1993 (Liverpool Victoria)
- 1994–1996 (Double Century Sherry)
- 2000, 2002–2004 (National Express)
- 2001–2001 (Steradent)
- 2023–2025 (Aviva)

== Past winners ==
Year	Champion	Club	County	Runner-up	Club	County	Ref
1933	Morton, Rodgers, Louisa King	Waddon Residents	Surrey		Hilly Fields	Kent	
1934	May Soppitt, Mabel Damon, Mrs Brown	Strawberry Hill	Middlesex	Mrs Kingston	Gravesend	Kent	
1935	G .F Barnes, Mrs E. M Privett, Ethel Tigg	Waddon Residents	Surrey	Mrs Ling	Preston Park Brighton	Sussex	
1936	G. F. Barnes, Mrs E. M Privett, Ethel Tigg	Waddon Residents	Surrey	Pryke, Stephenson, Miss Mitchell	Colchester	Essex	
1937	Mrs Crawford, Mrs Excel, Mrs Dennis	Bristol Pageant	Gloucs	Williamson, Gower, Smith	Blackheath	Kent	
1938	Mrs Cale, Burge, Elliott	Beach Park Worthing	Sussex	Williamson, Gower, Smith	Forest Hill	Kent	
1939	Hole, Nelson, Thorne	Wokingham	Berks & Bucks	Mrs Wills, Mrs Lodge, Miss Huggett	Cavendish Eastbourne	Sussex	
1940–1945 No competition due to war
1946	Isaac, Blay, Osey	Oxford City	Berks & Bucks	B Bigley, G Bigley, Mrs Jones	Letchworth	Herts	
1947	Mrs A. Gadbury, Mrs N. Davis, Mrs G. Martin	Ardagh	Gloucs	Mrs Tanner, Mrs Rook, Mrs Nye	Tunbridge Wells	Kent	
1948	Horn, Slade, Tolchard	Torquay	Devon	Linney, Cooke, Wolsey-Smith	Wimbledon Park	Surrey	
1949	G. Beck, W. A. Collins, H. L. Karn	Dorchester	Dorset	Gibbons, Clark, Rowe	Stretham Park	Cambs	
1950	Joyce Bettridge, Gertrude Bowyer, Winifred Jarrett	Norwood Green	Middx	Foster, Dassell, Wright	Motspur Park	Surrey	
1951	Finch, Whitfield, Rivers	Hurst	Berks & Bucks	Green, Wilson, Fisher	Torquay	Devon	
1952	Rosetta Capstick, Carvell, Green	Gunnersbury	Middx	Ainsley, Gallagher, Mills	Beach Park	Sussex	
1953	W. Murdoch, M. Dawes, Garner	Bournemouth	Hants	R. Howe, Skinner, Archer	Greyfields	Durham	
1954	M. Speight, B. A. Calvert, E. Walker	Wallsend	Northumb	Bayley, Eveleigh, Norah Crees	City of Exeter	Devon	
1955	Mrs L.A. Linney, Mrs T. C. Purkiss, Mrs W. Jackson	Wimbledon Park	Surrey	Osbourne, Bolt, Dorothy Payne	Dorchester	Dorset	
1956	R Clarke, W Dyos, L Merry	Egham	Surrey	J. Smallbone, K. Riley, D. King	Broadway	Worcs	
1957	C Tyler, A Wrigglesworth, D Hyland	Bexhill	Sussex	Annie May Pummell, Rose Excell, Bessie Burden	Ashford	Kent	
1958	Lily Scott, Marian Howe, Marjorie Marshall	Barnes Park	Durham	J Brittain, M Cobb, E Barton	St Neots	Cambs	
1959	Winifred Hall, E McCree, W Lambert	Culver Stanmore	Middx	D E Marshall, E A Frost, Ena Buckland	South Norwood	Surrey	
1960	D Hamer, Mary Shoesmith, Pamela Sawyer	Canoe Lake	Hants	G I Cozens, D Christopher, S Dickson	Dorchester	Dorset	
1961	D Penicud, G Foreman, G Wood	Windsor & Eton	Berks	A M Child, E Marvin, E A Grewcock	Earl Shilton	Leics	
1962	Lilian Bufton, L Randall, Minnie Powell	Tally Ho	Warks	K Redrup, H Biggs, G Barnard	Princes Risborough	Bucks	
1963	K Hedges, M Tildesley, V Hehges	Droitwich	Worcs	Margaret Green, Joan Colley, Joyce Hill	Torbay	Devon	
1964	Ivy Kelly, Marjorie Newbury, Winnie Hollow	Newton Abbot	Devon	T Wickenden, E Rawlinson, D L Wagstaff	Prittlewell	Essex	
1965	F Sharp, M McCarthy, M Blick	Maidenhead	Berks	V Corner, F Bulmer, L Truby	Bowburn	Durham	
1966	W Anderson, J Mills, Joan Sparkes	Falcon Chelmsford	Essex	M Kent, E Wright, H Baker	Mellows Park	Surrey	
1967	H Garner, O Marshall, Ena Buckland	South Norwood	Surrey	E Hindes, Mavis Cripps, E Strachan	Dovercourt	Essex	
1968	Lois Robertson, V Stevens, Mavis Steele	Watling Association	Middx	S Symonds, A Wyand, H Eglington	County Arts	Norfolk	
1969	M Blanch, G Taylor, J V Howes	Bognor Regis	Sussex	M Collins, J Lang, G Patten	Ilminster	Somerset	
1970	P Briggs, B Coombs, I Mouland	Moordown	Hants	M Spears, O Walkley, M Waterstone	Burton House	Lincs	
1971	I Cassidy, E Dean, C Gosling	Ilford	Essex	M Gooding, E Whitworth, D Rowland	Madeira Exmouth	Devon	
1972	P Carrot, W Anderson, Joan Sparkes	Central Park	Essex	L Warren, M Brooks, D Theaker	Bulwell	Notts	
1973	Parsons, B Taylor, M Welling	Atherley	Hants	B Gardiner, M Parry, M Perrett	Devizes	Wilts	
1974	R Ley, Margaret Lockwood, Irene Molyneux	Oxford City & County	Oxon	W March, E Dunn, M Sschacht	Shildon	Durham	
1975	Gwen Davis, Kathy Saill, Edith Howe	Cheltenham Spa	Glocs	Pat Page, Viv Chantler, Gladys Savage	Owls	Herts	
1976	Beryl Colgate, Pat White, Christine Wessier	Raynes Park	Surrey	Kate Stoten, Jane Fisher, Mary Thorne	Maulden	Beds	
1977	Penny Kauz, Olive Williams, Muriel Momber	Bristol St Andrews	Glocs	Beryl Colgate, Pat White, Christine Wessier	Raynes Park	Surrey	
1978	May Martin, Betty Ansell, Danny Danvers	Western Park	Leics	E Croft, Gladys Matthews, Madeline Gooding	Madeira	Devon	
1979	Bernice Trafford, Margaret Lockwood, Irene Molyneux	Oxford City & County	Oxon	Pearl Selwyn, Brenda Dingley, Phyllis Derrick	Magdalen Park	Surrey	
1980	Ann Tucker, Sylvia Goodenough, Doreen Fletcher	Fleet	Hants	Patsy Dance, Kay Rouse, Jess Millard	Shanklin	IOW	
1981	June Searle, Irene Briggs, Margaret Poots	Greenhill	Dorset	Anna Gordon, Sylvia Perkins, Ellen West	Bellingham	Kent	
1982	Joyce Jones, Marie Clark, Norma Shaw	Ropner Park	Durham	Margaret Cracknell, Brenda Tuck, Betty Pullen	Wymondham Dell	Norfolk	
1983	Trudy Tull, Ann Stone, Doris Cave	Blackheath & Greenwich	Kent	Joyce Jones, Marie Clark, Norma Shaw	Ropner Park	Durham	
1984	Gwen Rochester, Mary Atkinson, Barbara Fuller	Broomfield	Middx	Ruby Airey, Iris Lawson, Joyce Hull	Spennymoor	Durham	
1985	Betty Jacob, Wendy Line, Enid Fairhall	Southampton	Hants	Kath Adams, Sigrid Thomas, Maureen Edwards	Rugby Thornfield	Warks	
1986	Joyce Collinson, Ann Jones, Mary Price	Burnham	Bucks	Sue Swatland, Pip Green, Dorothy Lewis	Oadby	Leics	
1987	Eileen Vigor, Joyce Richards, Maureen James	Croydon	Surrey	J Gurney-Read, M Alstead, E Smith	Norfolk CC Staff	Norfolk	
1988	Joyce Collinson, Ann Erridge, Mary Price	Burnham	Bucks	S McNeil, Lucy Brownlie, Mavis Steele	Sunbury Sports	Middx	
1989	Christine Webb, Jenny Andrews, Jayne Roylance	North Walsham	Norfolk	Barbara Bridge, Sylvia Offler, Mavis Osbourne	Sherwood	Notts	
1990	Ann Haywood, Jill Ward, Shirley Page	Baldock	Herts	Ann Bellamy, Cath Smith, Sheila Wilson	North Scarle	Lincs	
1991	Audrey Mainwaring, Greta Winstone, Irene Molyneux	Oxford City & County	Oxon	Mary Taylor, Margaret Fellows, Edna Bessell	Yeovil	Somerset	
1992	Gill Blackmore, Katherine Hawes, Sylvia Rogers	Oxford City & County	Oxfordshire	Janet Marshall, Sheila Sewell, Pam Wynn	Chesterton	Cambs	
1993	Wendy Buckingham, Val Haste, Jill Polley	Great Baddow	Essex	Nora Hall, Amy Gowshall, Christine Gowshall	Park Avenue Grimsby	Lincs	
1994	Chris Winter, Pam Garden, Doreen Hankin	Egham	Surrey	Elizabeth Swadling, Pat Jose, Judith Reynolds	Penryn	Cornwall	
1995	Joyce Morgan, Sue Ritchie, June Larter	Chesterton	Cambs	Rita Payne, Mary Watson, Carol Clarke	Northfleet	Kent	
1996	Audrey Mainwaring, Greta Winstone, Irene Molyneux	Oxford City & County	Oxon	Jean Morris, Cath Smith, Jill Edson	Lincoln Park	Lincs	
1997	Margaret Nester, Margaret Walters, Dorothy Briars	Skegness	Lincs	Pat Rist, Sylvia Rogers, Sue Lacey	Oxford City & County	Oxon	
1998	Liz Tunn, Jenny Nicholson, Brenda Brown	Colchester	Essex	Jenny Whitlock, Maureen Monkton, Edna Bessell	Yeovil	Somerset	
1999	Carol Double, Dorothy Vincent, Carol McGrail	Temple	Surrey	Jean Sanderson, Anne Whittaker, Sandra White	Wooler	Northumb	
2000	Margaret Lawrence, Sian Maylin, Caroline Duarte	Magdalen Park	Surrey	Rita Moore, Carol Nichols, Dorothy Bannister	Kingscroft	Leics	
2001	Yvonne Wallington, Wendy King, Linda Ryan	Civil Service	Kent	Eileen West, Pam Lewis, Audrey Height	Rushden Town	Northants	
2002	Donna Marples, Jessie Hague, Pauline Marples	Blackwell	Derbyshire	Dawn Soughton, Joan Balding, Freda Shaw	Spalding Town	Lincs	
2003	Sheila Phillips, Linda Smith, Sharon Parnell	Plymouth City Bus	Devon	Yvonne Sheldon, Kathleen Draper, Lynne Mountain	Lincoln Park	Lincs	
2004	Jean Meneely, Freda Linberry, Wendy Davies	Field Place	Sussex	Lynne Whitehead, Pauline Marples, Jean Baker	Blackwell	Derbyshire	
2005	Sarah Newsom, Val Newsom, Catherine Popple	Peterborough	Hunts	Beryl Vickory, Dorothy Gardner, Cynthia May	Bude	Cornwall	
2006	Lynne Whitehead, Pat Oliver, Jean Baker	Blackwell	Derbyshire	Pat Walker, Linda Parker, Maureen Walker	Clarence Gardens	Yorks	
2007	Dorothy Bowers, Sue Alexander, Ellen Falkner	City of Ely	Cambs	Veronica Battersby, Joyce Hadfield, Joan Rees	St Austell	Cornwall	
2008	Carole Galletly, Stella Amos & Caroline Campion	Banbury Central	Oxon	Dorothy Bowers, Sue Alexander & Ellen Falkner	City of Ely	Cambs	
2009	June Wilson, Di Wilson & Penny Strong	Dunholme	Lincolnshire	Carol Gaskins, Donna Grant & Katherine Hawes	Oxford City & County	Oxon	
2010	Helen Mason, Jo Skelton & Kerry Bowley	Stute	Derbyshire	Margaret Watts, Rebecca Wigfield & Sharon Hall	Desborough	Northants	
2011	Ruth Rogers, Sophie Tolchard & Natalie Melmore	Kings Torquay	Devon	Jean Barwise, Sheila Dixon & Liz Garrity	Croft	Cumbria	
2012	Debbie Baker, Judy Banes & Amy Banes	Sheerness St George's	Kent	Sally Gilbert, Helen Moore & Jane Porter	Didcot	Berkshire	
2013	Kathleen Bowe, Eleanor Gass & Nicola Bowe	Wigton	Cumbria	Carole Galletly, Stella Amos & Caroline Campion	Banbury Central	Oxon	
2014	Helen Jones, Lorraine Kuhler & Sian Honnor	Homefield PaArk	Sussex	Lorraine Hume, Mary Williams & Denise Hodd	Polegrove	Sussex	
2015	Jenny Mitchell, Kimberley Tift & Jenny Dowers	Leighton Buzzard	Beds	Di Hurst, Jan Everitt & Pa Walker	Birstall	Leics	
2016	Sophie Tolchard, Lorraine Hackett & Natalie Chestney	Kings Torquay	Devon	Sharmista Patel, Maureen Vandrau & Margaret Smith	Sutton	Surrey	
2017	Chris Mitchell, Julie Jones & Alison Fail	Purton	Wiltshire	Terrie Wombwell, Liz Munro & Janet Eames	Dukeries	Notts	
2018	Sharmishta Patel, Maureen Vandrau & Margaret Smith	Sutton	Surrey	Margaret Watts, Katie Smith & Rebecca Wigfield	Desborough	Northants	
2019	Julie Leake, Bridget Hodder & Penny Cresswell	Poole Park	Dorset	Sharmishta Patel, Maureen Vandrau & Margaret Smith	Sutton	Surrey	
2020 No competition due to COVID-19 pandemic							
2021	Harriet Stevens, Sophie Tolchard & Emma Cooper	Kings Torquay	Devon	Charlotte Emanuel, Kat Hornbrook & Zoe Hollins	Milford	Surrey	
2022	Denise Hodd, Rachel Mackriell & Nina Allbut	Polegrove	Sussex	Helen Lewis-Wall, Sally-Ann Lewis-Wall, Jamie-Lea Winch	Kingscroft	Leics	
2023	Sophie Tolchard, Nicole Rogers, Harriet Stevens	Kings Torquay	Devon	Rachel Gingell, Kelly Jenkins, Pam Garden	Egham	Surrey	
2024	Louise Whyers, Penny Strong, Annalisa Dunham	Burton House	Lincs	Rebecca Willgress, Christine Rednall, Katherine Rednall	Norfolk BC	Norfolk	
2025	Ruby Philpott, Chelsea Spencer, Amy Pharaoh	Cleethorpes	Lincs	Donna Grant, Katherine Hawes-Watts, Lorraine Kuhler	Headington	Oxfordshire	
2026	Elizabeth Anderson, Yasmina Hasan, Debbie Souter	Southey	Surrey	Katherine Hawes-Watts, Morgan Merryweather, Lorraine Kuhler	Headington	Oxfordshire	
