= Bowls England National Championships (women's fours) =

British lawn bowls event

The women's fours originally known as the women's rinks is one of the events at the annual Bowls England National Championships.

== Venues ==
- 1932–1933 (Blackheath & Greenwich Club)
- 1934–1934 (Balham Constitutional Bowls Club)
- 1935–1936 (Pitshanger Park, Ealing)
- 1937–1974 (Wimbledon Park)
- 1975–present (Victoria Park, Royal Leamington Spa)

== Sponsors ==
- 1981–1985 (Lombard)
- 1986–1993 (Liverpool Victoria)
- 1994–1996 (Double Century Sherry)
- 2000, 2002–2004 (National Express)
- 2001–2001 (Steradent)
- 2023–2025 (Aviva)

== Past winners ==
Year	Champion	Club	County	Runner-up	Club	County	Ref
1932	Gilchrist, Ethel Tigg; Mrs E. M Privett, Mrs S. Holman	Waddon Residents	Surrey	Miss Johnston	Windsor & Eton	Berks	
1933	Fry, White; Llewelyn, Clara Johns	Cavendish Eastbourne	Sussex	Gilchrist, Ethel Tigg; Mrs E. M Privett, Mrs S. Holman	Waddon Residents	Surrey	
1934	Fry, White; Llewelyn, Clara Johns	Cavendish Eastbourne	Sussex	Mrs Wignall, Miss Biscombe, Mrs Harrington, Mrs E. J. Woodcock	Southbourne & Bournemouth	Hants	
1935	Fry, White; Llewelyn, Clara Johns	Cavendish Eastbourne	Sussex	Mrs R. C Codd, Mrs Shewan, Mrs Batsford, Mrs Ward	Temple Fortune	Middx	
1936	Nash, Foord; Tyler, Ling	Preston Park Brighton	Sussex	Mrs Ruffnell, Mrs Spencer; Mrs Morton, Mrs Fawcett	Kingston Canbury	Surrey	
1937	Mrs Swann, Mrs Reed; Mrs West, Miss Wardle	Bloomfield Bath	Somerset	Mrs Fawcett, Mrs Morton; Mrs Spencer, Little	Kingston Canbury	Surrey	
1938	Mrs L. Sharpe, Allen; E. Sharp, Woolridge	Grovelands	Middx	Mrs Elliott, Mrs Shearn, Mrs Burge, Mrs Cale	Beach Park Worthing	Sussex	
1939	Holmes, Reader; Fulton, Bassett	Hastings & St. Leonards	Sussex	Mrs Carr, Mrs Haywood, Mrs Cumming, Mrs Bott	Western Park	Leics	
1940–1945 No competition due to war
1946	Mrs S. Holman, Mrs G. F. Barnes; Miss Lambert, Louisa King	Waddon Residents	Surrey	Lucy, Drew; Dale, Violet Woodhead	Newton Abbot	Devon	
1947	Carvell, Benstead; Green, Culverhouse	Gunnersbury	Middx	Hooper, Campbell-Dykes; Finch, Blick	Maidenhead Town	Bucks & Berks	
1948	Mills, Gomm; Ainsley, Cale	Beach House	Sussex	Rosetta Capstick, Ireland; Carvell, Green	Gunnersbury	Middx	
1949	A. Twigger, Hemming; Brooks, Barlow	Stoke	Warks	Gill, Gould; Marshall, Chandler	South Norwood	Surrey	
1950	Lucy, Kerslake; Dale, Violet Woodhead	Paignton	Devon	Smythe, Abrams; Sievwright, McWilliams	Corby	Surrey	
1951	Ena Buckland, Medland; Durban, George	South Norwood	Surrey	Florence Stewart, Pocock; Roff, Cotes	Misbourne	Berks & Bucks	
1952	J. Grievison, A. Nesbit; O. Punton, O. Wright	Choppington Welfare	Northumb	Mrs G. Gilchrist, Mrs Pitcher; Mrs A. Wrigley, Mrs M. Wright	Burton House	Lincs	
1953	Rosetta Capstick, Warfield; Carvell, Green	Gunnersbury	Middx	Osbourne, Dickson; Dorothy Payne, Matthews	Dorchester	Dorset	
1954	Wake, White; Wilkinson, Spowart	Cowpen & Crofton	Northumb	Willingham, Powesland; Morgan, Hollow	Newton Abbot	Devon	
1955	Mrs G. Gilchrist, Mrs Pitcher; Mrs A. Wrigley, Mrs M. Wright	Burton House	Lincs	Mrs L. Stain, Mrs D. Hatton; Mrs P. Silcock, Mrs K. Orgill	Blidworth Colliery	Notts	
1956	I Linney, H J Cockney; T C Purkiss, W Jackson	Wimbledon Park	Surrey	E Vellere, E Grant; R Dibble, Roma Townsend	Tally Ho	Warks	
1957	D Vincent, S Lucas; Florrie Wilson, A V Webster	Hastings & St. Leonards	Sussex	D Helliker, V Bright; E Johnson, A Fisher	Pageant	Glocs	
1958	H Delnevo, D Turner; Venora Stew, M Lynn	City & County	Oxon	N Malia, Ivy Todd; Lorna Shields, Ella Johnston	Exhibition Park	Northumb	
1959	E Turner, A Welshman; L E Slater, R M B Robertson	Muswell Hill	Middx	L Cawson, N Horlock; P Mortimer, M E Quick	Newton Abbot	Devon	
1960	L Garrod, E Marjoram; R Sayer, Mary Smith	Kensington Gardens	Suffolk	F A Morgan, E M Fookes; E F Wilson, V Doyle	Hastings & St. Leonards	Sussex	
1961	Mary Riddlestone, Dorothy Panks; Mary Williams, Hilda Rule	Boxford	Suffolk	H Hopkins, O Marshall; E Frost, Ena Buckland	South Norwood	Surrey	
1962	Winifred Hall, F Churcher; E McCrae, W Lambert	Culver Stanmore	Middx	R Lawford, S Waters; Doreen Clark, M Astle	Lakeside	Notts	
1963	L Robertson, G Smith; V Stevens, Mavis Steele	Watling	Middx	M Green, Jeanette Webber; Joan Colley, I Hill	Torbay	Devon	
1964	G Sharp, B Needham, M Watchorn, E Wrigley	Burton House	Lincs	E Robertson, I Smallbone; J Riely, D King	Broadway	Worcs	
1965	M Sansom, M Ashdown; E Swain, M Young	Luton Town	Beds	E Dodge, I Scott; N Denny, O Freeman	Felixstowe & Suffolk	Suffolk	
1966	F Rudkin, I Jones; I L Jones, C Hornsby	South Woodford	Essex	M Ashton, N Wildbore; M Cox, S Clarke	Enderby	Leics	
1967	S Mulhern, M Barnston; D Hills, M Kinnersley	Morpeth	Northumb	I Power, E Salter; E Lockington, M Wadsworth	Egham	Surrey	
1968	E Wright, E Easton; R Young, Evelyn Bryant	Bournemouth	Hants	V Easton, M Baxter; E Haile, Eleanor Routledge	Silloth	Cumb	
1969	B Mackerness, M Bartlett; V Stevens, Mavis Steele	Watling	Middx	R Jamieson, H W Warner; V D Roche, E Steventon	Florence Park	Oxon	
1970	P Woodhouse, B Marigold; M Albery, E Smith	Homefield Park	Sussex	K Lee, P Briggs; B Coombs, I Mouland	Moordown	Hants	
1971	E Robertson, M Clifford; L Turner, A Gould	Hook & Southborough	Surrey	I Young, E Pink; M Dunn, M Cross	Den Teignmouth	Devon	
1972	T Bates, R Steels; N Johnson, M Wright	Burton House	Lincs	M Jones, W Morgan; I Crew, F Wright	Redland	Glocs	
1973	M Chiltern, G Hopkinson; L Ward, D Francis	Cornfield Road	Yorks	D McNair, J Williamson; J Catterall, C Pilkington	Heaton Hall	Lancs	
1974	Audrey Neal, D Redgrave; Betty Annison, Jean Youngs	County Arts	Norfolk	M Florey, F Joyce; Margaret Lockwood, Irene Molyneux	Oxford City & County	Oxon	
1975	A Edginton, A Lee; E Greaves, Edna Harris	Goodwood	Leics	E James, D Cook; M Ruskin, M Rich	Moordown	Hants	
1976	E Moore, A Jones; M Gibson, G Marlow	Blackpool	Lancs	A Townsend, M McVittie; Chris Wessier, Jean Valls	Raynes Park	Surrey	
1977	B Johnson, M Clark; M Burnett, Norma Shaw	Ropner Park	Durham	Gwen Bryan, Cath Steele; Ann Cockayne, Claire Reynolds	Waverley	Notts	
1978	Anita Kaye, D Walsh; Helen Allsop, Alice Steventon	Torbay County	Devon	Bernice Trafford, Pamela Allison; Margaret Lockwood, Irene Molyneux	Oxford City & County	Oxon	
1979	Pat Davies, Eileen Rolf; Joan Moffett, Eve Bruntnell	Leominster	Herefords	Bernice Trafford, Pamela Allison; Margaret Lockwood, Irene Molyneux	Oxford City & County	Oxon	
1980	Daphne Kennedy, Doreen Williams; Margaret Amos, Win Doubleday	Canterbury	Kent	Anne Pascoe, Betty Collins; Mary Brokenshire, Gloria Thomas	Helston	Cornwall	
1981	Wendy Clarke, E Hicks; C Croad, Enid Fairhall	Southampton	Hants	Kate Exton, Marion Jackson; Joan Ayliff, June Fowler	Bourne	Lincs	
1982	Gwen Rochester, F Lilly; Mary Atkinson, Barbara Fuller	Broomfield	Middx	M Shepherd, E Norris; N Halse, M Halse	Lammas	Middx	
1983	Pamela Gill, Valerie Chapman; Sybil Symonds, Margaret Doggett	County Arts	Norfolk	Elizabeth Johnson, Joyce Jones; Marie Clark, Norma Shaw	Ropner Park	Durham	
1984	Ann Anderson, Rene Gordon; Mary Burdess, Edna Wailes	Woodland	Durham	J Tiner, J Hennessey; J Downer, A Taylor	Guildford	Surrey	
1985	Christine Webb, Pat Emery; Jenny Andrews, Jayne Roylance	Cromer Marrams	Norfolk	A Roxton, G Williams; I Foote, S White	Edmonton	Middx	
1986	Greta Winstone, Margaret Ellis; Bernice Trafford, Irene Molyneux	Oxford City & County	Oxon	J Curgenven, P Clarke; M Venn, M Robertson	Tiverton Borough	Devon	
1987	Eileen Vigor, Marjorie Salter; Muriel Kelly, Pam Ward	Croydon	Surrey	I Glover, S Butler; J Burbage, J Armstrong	Edenside	Cumbria	
1988	M Norris, Wyn Sowerby; M Bray, Margaret Heggie	Edenside	Cumbria	M Zimmoch, E Coultas; J Chelin, P Napier	Bert Keech	Yorks	
1989	Hazel Dobbs, Marjorie Curtis; Jo Hardy, Diana Whittingham	Kingsway Hove	Sussex	Norma May, Janet Smith; Sylvia Coak, Vera Ireland	West Cornwall	Cornwall	
1990	Sheila Turner, Jill Gush; Carol Waters, Betty Mackerness	Starcross	Devon	Brenda Wills, Sue Bagshaw; Gill Fitzgerald, Mavis Buckby	Kettering	Northants	
1991	Ann Foxton, Gwen Williams; Ina Foote, Sheila White	Edmonton	Middx	Mary Taylor, S Cowcher; Margaret Fellows, Edna Bessell	Yeovil	Somerset	
1992	Ann Harrison, Joan Heath; Rita Vane, Ann Smith	Kearnsey	Kent	Susan Mart, Barbara Clark; Jackie Bailey, Gladys Hofton	Players	Notts	
1993	Jean Chudley, R Pittman; I Porter, R Peters	Broadstone	Dorset	Sandra Lake, Vera Bence; Sue Falconer, Joan Abel	Wellingborough	Northants	
1994	Sarah Newson, Valerie Newson; Mandy Brundle, Catherine Anton	Peterborough & Dis	Hunts	Jackie Turner, Ann Parker; Sheila Keeling, Brenda Atherton	Carlton Conway	Notts	
1995	Dawn Chittock, Hilda Hines; Ann Cox, Lynne Thelwell	Marlow	Bucks	Maureen Barker, Jean Baker; Jean Thomson, Glennis Haines	Blackwell	Derbys	
1996	Norma Beales, Sheila O'Hara; Jan Millard, Mary Price	Burnham	Bucks	Nora Hall, Margaret Leggett; Christine Gowshall, Amy Gowshall	Park Avenue	Lincs	
1997	Maureen Barker, Jean Baker; Jean Thompson, Glennis Haines	Blackwell	Derbys	Jean Meneely, J Atyed; Freda Linberry, Wendy Davies	Field Place Worthing	Sussex	
1998	Marlene Kemp, Margaret Payle; Marion Collins, Pat Sutton	Atherley	Hants	Jane Herbert, Sheila Reed; Pam Turner, Joyce Needham	Western Park	Leics	
1999	Moreen Sellars, Rose Rowsell; Sybil Bisset, Margaret Dyer	Clevedon Promenade	Somerset	Elisa Simmons, Sue Jordan-Smith; Pat Lawrence, Norma Hazzeldine	Long Eaton Silver Band	Derbys	
2000	Ann Haywood, Rose Castle; Gill Carver, Shirley Page	Baldock	Herts	Audrey Mainwaring, Lesley Storer; Carol Penson, Irene Molyneux	Oxford City & County	Oxon	
2001	Sue Roach, Barbara Rowie; Olive Polglase, Margaret Warren	Portleven	Cornwall	Eileen Perry, Lin Wright; Pat Rogers, Sue Sprigell	Chesham	Bucks	
2002	Margaret Robson, Maureen Gowland; Edna Stokoe, Gillian Jones	Consett Park	Durham	Gwen Daniels, Liz Swadling; Pat Jose, Judith Reynolds	Penryn	Cornwall	
2003	Emma Thurston, Mary Malton; Wendy Lutkin, Pat Reynolds	Whittlesey Manor	Hunts	Inger Newman, Pam Garden; Irene Jenkins, Doreen Hankin	Egham	Surrey	
2004	Sarah Newson, Doris Flowers; Val Newson, Catherine Popple	Peterborough	Hunts	Vaunder Lee, Barbara Pendrich; Cynthia Perrin, Joyce Hadfield	Newquay Trenance	Cornwall	
2005	Inger Newman, Pam Garden; Kath Strutt, Pat Launders	Egham	Surrey	Dot Kennelly, Sue Taylor; Sue Tomlinson, Carol Instone	Dunnington	Yorks	
2006	Lynne Whitehead, Pauline Marples; Jean Baker, Pat Oliver	Blackwell	Derbys	Jean Drury, Lois Kirkwood; Mary Bryan, June Hartley	Nafferton	Yorks	
2007	Sarah Newson, Julie Masters; Val Newson, Catherine Popple	Peterborough	Hunts	Zelma French, Jill Nicholson; Elizabeth Tunn, Brenda Brown	Colchester West End	Essex	
2008	Ann Warrington, Rosemarie Hilton; Sheron Mitchell & Carole Cuell	Croydon	Surrey	Anne Haywood, Heather Stapleford; Rosie Castle & Shirley Page	Baldock	Herts	
2009	Sarah Newson, Val Newson; Wendy Harrold & Catherine Popple	Peterborough & Dis	Hunts	Daphne Anderson, Bridget Collins; Wendy Adams & April Janman	Chichester Priory	Sussex	
2010	Carole Andrews, Sandra Maguire; Rose Lewis & Brenda Atherton	Forest Oaks	Notts	Shirley Dutton, Marion Evans; Nell Westlake & Lilian Holliday	Wokingham	Berks	
2011	Tracey Dent, Kirsty Burnett-Cox; Christine Gowshall & Amy Gowshall	Cleethorpes	Lincs	Margaret Watts, Veronica Gribble; Rebecca Wigfield & Sharon Hall	Desborough Town	Northants	
2012	Pa Walker, Jan Everitt; Jennie Groves & Diane Hurst	Birstall	Leics	Kirsty Richards, Pat Humpage; Ruth Phillips & Sandra Smith	Bournville	Warks	
2013	Sheila Seddon, Zoe Hollins; Gill Platt & Caroline Stevens	Milford	Surrey	Val Molton, Pat Baker; Pam Salvage & Sue Osborne	Kingswood & Hanham	Glocs	
2014	Myra Lewis, Donna Knight; Gail Gilkes & Katherine Hawes	Oxford City & County	Oxon	Maggie Edwards, Jasmin Spear; Yvonne McKee & Brenda Bishop	Kingsthorpe	Northants	
2015	Margaret Watts, Jeannie Flippance; Katie Smith & Rebecca Wigfield	Desborough Town	Northants	Chris Thomas, Jenny Goodman; Kathy Green & Brenda Davies	Hurstpierpoint	Sussex	
2016	Doreen Hankin, Glenda Dexter; Norma Beales & Pauline Clarke	Egham	Surrey	Rebecca Field, Carole Baker; Harriett Segasby & Jackie Devitt	Norfolk BC	Norfolk	
2017	Cathy Taylor, Nadine Mullins; Jean Staples & Ann Halliday	Cambridge Park	Middx	Dee Moores, Elisabeth Anderson; Shan Maylin & Debbie Souter	Southey	Surrey	
2018	Sophie Tolchard, Kelly Atkinson; Lorraine Hackett & Natalie Chestney	Kings Torquay	Devon	Emily Ferguson, Sandy Hazell; Wendy King & Sian Honnor	UK Paper	Kent	
2019	Lauren Hackett, Hayley James; Emma Cooper & Harriet Stevens	Kings Torquay	Devon	Steph Pinson, Sandie Smith; Bridget Hodder & Penny Cresswell	Poole Park	Dorset	
2020 No competition due to the COVID-19 pandemic							
2021	Hayley Kenny, Michelle Squires; Serena Madgewick & Rebecca Smith	Clockhouse	Essex	Louise Williams, Brenda Benney; Nicola Ellis & Frances Phillips	Helston	Cornwall	
2022	Helen Butler, Louise Whyers; Penny Strong, Annalisa Dunham & Pearl Flowers	Carters Park	Lincs	Donna Knight, Carol Gaskins; Katherine Hawes & Lorraine Kuhler	Oxford City & County	Oxon	
2023	Jemma Tuohy, Yasmina Hasan; Elizabeth Anderson & Debbie Souter	Egham	Surrey	Sally Gilbert, Angela Service; Helen Moore & Lynn Orlando	Didcot	Berks	
2024	Michelle Meadowcroft, Ellie Hamblett; Emily Kernick, Kirsty Richards	Royal Leamington Spa	Warks	Sara George, Jacquil Branfield, Laura Holden, Stef Branfield	Clevedon	Som	
2025	Sara George, Olivia Starr, Laura Holden, Stef Branfield	Clevedon	Som	Karen Millward, Pip Maxwell, Aqua Griffiths, Izzie White	Chester Road	Worcs	
2026	Karen Hofen, Julie Leake, Millie Tuck, Bridget Hodder	Poole Park	Dorset	Michelle Meadowcroft, Jacqui Ashley, Emily Kernick, Kirsty Richards	Royal Leamington Spa	Warks	
