= Bowls England National Championships (women's singles two wood) =

British lawn bowls event

The women's singles two wood is one of the events at the annual Bowls England National Championships.

The two-wood singles is a newer variation of the game; see Glossary of bowls terms.

== Venues ==
- 1939–1974 (Wimbledon Park)
- 1975–present (Victoria Park, Royal Leamington Spa)

== Sponsors ==
- 1981–1985 (Lombard)
- 1986–1993 (Liverpool Victoria)
- 1994–1996 (Double Century Sherry)
- 2000–2001 (Steradent)
- 2002–2004 (National Express)
- 2023–2025 (Aviva)

== Past winners ==
Year	Champion	Club	County	Runner-up	Club	County	Ref
1939	Lily Parnell	Clarence Park	Somerset	Mrs Yerbury	Bloomfield Bath	Somerset	
1940–1944 No competition due to war
1946	Sarah Osey	Oxford City	Berks & Bucks	Mrs Gadbury	Ardagh, Bristol	Gloucs	
1947	Louisa Coxall	Sittingbourne	Kent	Maud Chillman	Hampden Park	Sussex	
1948	Frances Carvell	Gunnersbury	Middlesex	Maud Chillman	Hampden Park	Sussex	
1949	Maud Chillman	Hampden Park	Sussex	Doris Rigby	Belgrave	Leices	
1950	Mrs F. N. Dickinson	Sidmouth	Devon	Rosetta Capstick	Gunnersbury	Middlesex	
1951	Florence Wright	Horden	Durham	Helen Clayton	Horsham	Sussex	
1952	Evelyn Courtenay	Yeovil	Somerset	Mrs C. Carr	Western Park	Leics	
1953	Winnifred Griffiths	Plymouth Hoe	Devon	Maud Chillman	Hampden Park	Sussex	
1954	Mrs H. Taylor	Loxford	Essex	Eveline Wheeler	Richmond Park Bournemouth	Hants	
1955	Audrey Frances Thomas	Ilford	Essex	Mrs E K Simpson	Southgate	Middlesex	
1956	Minna Chamberlain Rubery	Victoria	Essex	Eleanor Cordy Allen	Ipswich	Suffolk	
1957	Doreen Clark	Ericsson's	Notts	Gwen Webber	Barnstaple	Devon	
1958	Annie Beath	Zetland Park, Redcar	Yorkshire	Mrs S. Bulmer	Bowburn	Durham	
1959	Lena Careswell	Hornsey	Middlesex	Violet Rawlings	Gidea Park	Essex	
1960	Gwen Webber	Ashleigh Road	Devon	Mavis Cripps	Dovercourt	Essex	
1961	Mabel Darlington	Nuneaton	Warwicks	Joyce Lucking	Windsor Castle	Berks	
1962	Mrs M. Smith	Ilford	Essex	Winnie Winslow	Salisbury	Wilts	
1963	Mrs L. Cudmore	Fleming Park	Hants	Mrs I. Parham	Shell	Essex	
1964	Ena Buckland	South Norwood	Surrey	Mrs A. Smith	Kettering	Northants	
1965	Nancie Evans	Frome Selwood	Somerset	Mrs E. Knight	Lakeside	Notts	
1966	Mrs M Harrison	Wolvey	Warwicks	Mrs V L Turner	Hook & Southborough	Surrey	
1967	Ivy Burns	Avenue Leamington	Warwicks	Mrs E Stevens	Misbourne	Bucks	
1968	Edna Britton	Vernon Park	Notts	Iris Smith	Watford	Herts	
1969	Joan Hunt	Atherley	Hants	Doreen Clark	Lakeside	Notts	
1970	Phyllis Derrick	Magdalen Park	Surrey	Mrs M Allan	Courtfield Carlisle	Cumberland	
1971	Mrs N Galloway	Owton Lodge	Durham	Mrs D Smith	Devizes	Wilts	
1972	Brenda Atherton	Plessey	Notts	Mrs B. Forton	Norfolk BC	Norfolk	
1973	Mrs W Stevenson	Auriol Park	Surrey	Ruth Butterworth	YPI Hull	Yorkshire	
1974	Lana Maynard	Hatfield	Herts	Mrs J. A. Laws	Whitley & Monkseaton	Northumberland	
1975	Joan Hunt	Atherley	Hampshire	Anne Shipton	Broadstone	Dorset	
1976	Eileen King	Poole Park	Dorset	Norah Greenwood	Sileby	Northumberland	
1977	Winifred Hall	Culver	Middlesex	Anne Shipton	Broadstone	Dorset	
1978	Norma Shaw	Ropner Park	Durham	Eileen Fletcher	Poole Park	Dorset	
1979	Irene Molyneux	Oxford City & County	Oxfordshire	Phyllis Derrick	Magdalen Park	Surrey	
1980	Betty Newborn	Belgrave	Leics	Margaret Lockwood	Oxford City & County	Oxfordshire	
1981	Eveline Gascoigne	Silver Band	Notts	Verinia Lewis	Bodmin	Cornwall	
1982	Kath Steer	King's Heath	Warwicks	Win Scales	Herne Bay	Kent	
1983	Norma Shaw	Ropner Park	Durham	Joan Plackett	Worthing	Sussex	
1984	Val Vintiner	Lammas	Middlesex	Eileen Bird	Sherwood	Notts	
1985	Joan Bryant	Brockenhurst	Hants	Margaret Wilson	Bembridge	Isle of Wight	
1986	Norma Shaw	Ropner Park	Durham	Mary Saunders	Eye	Suffolk	
1987	Sue Franklin	Woolpack Wisbech	Norfolk	Jean Frame	West Bridgford	Notts	
1988	Jayne Roylance	North Walsham	Norfolk	Gwen Daniels	Penryn	Cornwall	
1989	Catherine Anton	Peterborough	Hunts	Edna Bessell	Yeovil	Somerset	
1990	Gill Fitzgerald	Kettering Lodge	Northants	Beryl Noble	Luton Town	Beds	
1991	Wendy Line	Southampton	Hants	Jean Baker	Alfreton	Derbyshire	
1992	Margaret Dyer	Clevedon Promenade	Somerset	Jean Cleft	Durham City	Durham	
1993	Val Chatfield	Woolwich & Plumstead	Kent	Kathie Scott	Crawley	Sussex	
1994	Brenda Whitehead	Norfolk BC	Norfolk	Gill Fitzgerald	Kettering Lodge	Northants	
1995	Liz Shorter	County Arts	Norfolk	Sharon Rickman	Raynes Park	Surrey	
1996	Margaret Ashford	Beccles	Suffolk	Catherine Anton	Peterborough	Hunts	
1997	Katherine Hawes	Oxford City & County	Oxfordshire	Ann Parker	Carlton Conway	Notts	
1998	Maureen Christmas	Chesterton	Cambs	Cindy Edmonson	Skelton Penrith	Cumbria	
1999	Elizabeth Messer	Southbourne	Hants	Lynne Whitehead	Norfolk BC	Norfolk	
2000	Maureen Timms	Whitnash	Warwicks	Janet Green	West Moors	Dorset	
2001	Brenda Atherton	Carlton Conway	Notts	Kath Baxter	Wigton	Cumbria	
2002	Janet Hardie	Westinghouse	Wiltshire	Heather Stapleford	Oakham	Leics	
2003	Ann Dennis	Milton Regis	Kent	Sue Davies	Broadway	Worcs	
2004	Shirley Page	Baldock	Herts	Janet Cropper	Bolton	Lancs	
2005	Amy Monkhouse	Waltham Park	Lincolnshire	Theresa Parnell	Stockton	Durham	
2006	Wendy King	Milton Regis	Hampshire	Joan Garner	Erdington Court	Warwickshire	
2007	Jean Baker	Blackwell	Derbyshire	Amy Stanton	Wellington	Somerset	
2008	Edna Bessell	Yeovil	Somerset	Doreen Hankin	Egham	Surrey	
2009	Wendy King	Milton Regis	Hampshire	Joan Walmsley	Bath	Somerset	
2010	Sue Davies	Broadway	Worcestershire	Shirley Page	Baldock	Hertfordshire	
2011	Ellen Falkner	St Neots	Cambridgeshire	Muriel Scott	North Tawton	Devon	
2012	Pat Bourne	Purley Bury	Surrey	Sue Dadson	Southbourne	Hampshire	
2013	Rebecca Wigfield	Desborough	Northamptonshire	Brenda Whitehead	Norfolk BC	Norfolk	
2014	Rebecca Field	Norfolk BC	Norfolk	Kate Herbison	Congresbury	Somerset	
2015	Margaret Smith	Sutton	Surrey	Jessica Eley	Bushey	Hertfordshire	
2016	Joan Welch	Riverain	Herts	Gillian Lamprey	Lowestoft Railway	Suffolk	
2017	Jamie-Lea Winch	Kingscroft	Leicestershire	Sophie Tolchard	Kings	Devon	
2018	Amy Gowshall	Cleethorpes	Lincolnshire	Rebecca Field	Norfolk BC	Norfolk	
2019	Sophie Tolchard	Kings	Devon	Donna Rock	Gillingham	Dorset	
2020 No competition due to COVID-19 pandemic							
2021	Stef Branfield	Clevedon	Somerset	Katherine Hawes	Oxford City	Oxfordshire	
2022	Rhianna Russell	Welwyn & District	Hertfordshire	Jennifer Southby	Barstead & Thurnham	Kent	
2023	Laura Holden	Clevedon	Som	Shannon Maughan	Bletchley Town	Bucks	
2024	Laura Holden	Clevedon	Som	Lorraine Kuhler	Oxford City & County	Oxon	
2025	Jane Murphy	Bletchley Town	Bucks	Kat Bowman	New Lount	Leics	
2026	Emily Kernick	Royal Leamington Spa	Warwicks	Katherine Hawes-Watts	Headington	Oxon	
