= 1977 World Outdoor Bowls Championship =

Women's World Outdoor Championships 1977
- 3rd Women's World Outdoor Bowls Championships
- Location: Beach House Park, Worthing, England
- Date(s): 21 May - 05 June, 1977.
- Category: World Bowls Championship

The 1977 Women's World Outdoor Bowls Championship was held Beach House Park in Worthing, England, from 21 May to 5 June 1977.

Elsie Wilkie successfully defended her singles title which was held in a round robin format.

The pairs went to Hong Kong, the triples to Wales and the fours to Australia. The Taylor Trophy was won by the Australian team.

== Medallists ==
Event	Gold	Silver	Bronze
Women's singles	(New Zealand); Elsie Wilkie	(Canada); June Bell	(Papua New Guinea); Norma de la Motte
Women's pairs	(Hong Kong); Elvie Chok; Helen Wong	(Australia); Lorna Lucas; Dot Jenkinson	(Wales); Janet Ackland; Lilian Nicholas
Women's triples	(Wales); Joan Osborne; Enid Morgan; Margaret Pomeroy	(New Zealand); Cis Winstanley; Pearl Dymond; Hazel Harper	(United States); Corinna Folkins; Dorothy Bacon; Louise Godfrey
Women's fours	(Australia); Dot Jenkinson; Connie Hicks; Lorna Lucas; Merle Richardson	(England); Margaret Lockwood; Joan Hunt; Mabel Darlington; Joan Sparkes	(Wales); Joan Osborne; Enid Morgan; Margaret Pomeroy; Janet Ackland
Women's team	Australia	Wales	New Zealand

== Results ==
=== Women's singles – round robin ===
Pos	Player	P	W	L	Pts
1	(New Zealand) Elsie Wilkie	13	9	4	18
2	(Canada) June Bell	13	9	4	18
3	(Papua New Guinea) Norma de la Motte	13	9	4	18
4	(Guernsey) Dot Foley	13	8	5	16
5	(Israel) Helen Gordon	13	8	5	16
6	(Australia) Norma Massey	13	8	5	16
7	(Hong Kong) Helen Wong	13	7	6	14
8	(Wales) Lilian Nicholas	13	7	6	14
9	(England) Mavis Steele	13	6	7	12
10	(Scotland) Eva Neil	13	6	7	12
11	(Republic of Ireland) Nessie Burnett	13	6	7	12
12	(Malawi) Peggy Chalmers	13	4	9	8
13	(Jersey) Rose Stableford	13	2	11	4
14	(United States) Dorothy Bacon	13	2	11	4

=== Women's pairs – round robin ===
Pos	Player	P	W	D	L	Pts
1	(Hong Kong) Elvie Chok & Helen Wong	13	12	0	1	24
2	(Australia) Lorna Lucas & Dot Jenkinson	13	11	1	1	23
3	(Wales) Janet Ackland & Lilian Nicholas	13	7	1	5	15
4	(Republic of Ireland) Nessie Burnett & Ellen Cameron	13	7	1	5	15
5	(New Zealand) Irene Foote & Elsie Wilkie	13	7	1	5	15
6	(England) Joan Hunt & Mavis Steele	13	6	1	6	13
7	(Papua New Guinea) Marion Bramwell & Norma de la Motte	13	6	0	7	12
8	(Scotland) Eva Neil & Jean Frame	13	6	0	7	12
9	(Canada) Shirley Otis & June Bell	13	6	0	7	12
10	(Guernsey) Pamela Le Tissier & Dot Foley	13	6	0	7	12
11	(United States) Irma Artist & Muriel Pat Boehm	13	5	1	7	11
12	(Malawi) Peggy Chalmers & Margaret Penman	13	3	0	10	6
13	(Israel) Edith Cohen-Mintz & Molly Skudowitz	13	3	0	10	6
14	(Jersey) Margaret Blattman & G Crossley	13	3	0	10	6

=== Women's triples – round robin ===
Pos	Player	P	W	D	L	Pts
1	(Wales) Joan Osborne, Enid Morgan & Margaret Pomeroy	13	10	1	2	21
2	(New Zealand) Cis Winstanley, Pearl Dymond & Hazel Harper	13	10	0	3	20
3	(United States) Corinna Folkins, Dorothy Bacon, Louise Godfrey	13	8	1	4	17
4	(Australia) Connie Hicks, Merle Richardson & Norma Massey	13	8	0	5	16
5	(Hong Kong) Marie Rozario, Joyce Liddell & Bea da Silva	13	7	1	5	15
6	(Republic of Ireland) Ireland	13	7	1	5	15
7	Scotland	13	7	0	6	14
8	(England) Margaret Lockwood, Mabel Darlington & Joan Sparkes	13	7	0	6	14
9	Israel	13	6	1	6	13
10	(Canada) Violet Eastwood, Freda Munro & Nell Hunter	13	6	0	7	12
11	(Papua New Guinea) Margaret Araji, Betty Glassey, Margaret Ramsbotham	13	5	0	8	10
12	Jersey	13	3	0	10	6
13	Malawi	13	3	0	10	6
14	Guernsey	13	1	1	11	3

=== Women's fours – round robin ===
Pos	Player	P	W	D	L	Pts
1	(Australia) Dot Jenkinson, Connie Hicks, Lorna Lucas & Merle Richardson	13	10	0	3	20
2	(England) Margaret Lockwood, Joan Hunt, Mabel Darlington & Joan Sparkes	13	10	0	3	20
3	(Wales) Joan Osborne, Enid Morgan, Margaret Pomeroy & Janet Ackland	13	9	1	3	19
4	Scotland	13	9	0	4	18
5	(Papua New Guinea) Marion Bramwell, Margaret Araji, Betty Glassey, Margaret Ramsbotham	13	7	1	5	15
6	(New Zealand) Irene Foote, Pearl Dymond, Cis Winstanley & Hazel Harper	13	7	0	6	14
7	(Hong Kong) Marie Rozario, Joyce Liddell, Bea da Silva & Elvie Chok	13	7	0	6	14
8	(Republic of Ireland) Ireland	13	6	1	6	13
9	(United States) Corinna Folkins, Louise Godfrey, Irma Artist & Muriel Pat Boehm	13	6	0	7	12
10	(Canada) Violet Eastwood, Freda Munro, Nell Hunt & Shirley Otis	13	4	1	8	9
11	Israel	13	4	1	8	9
12	Guernsey	13	4	0	9	8
13	Malawi	13	4	0	9	8
14	Jersey	13	2	1	10	3

=== Taylor Trophy ===
Pos	Player	Singles	Pairs	Triples	Fours	Total
1	Australia	6th	2nd	4th	1st	75
2	Wales	8th	3rd	1st	3rd	71
3	New Zealand	1st	5th	2nd	6th	67
4	Hong Kong	7th	1st	5th	7th	67
