= Irene Foote (bowls) =

New Zealand lawn bowler

Personal information
- Nationality: New Zealand

Sport
- Sport: Lawn bowls
- Club: Hauriki BC; Matua BC; Thames Valley BC; Bay of Plenty BC
Medal record
Representing New Zealand
World Outdoor Championships
Gold medal – first place	1973 Wellington	triples
Gold medal – first place	1973 Wellington	fours
Gold medal – first place	1973 Wellington	team
Bronze medal – third place	1977 Worthing	team

Irene Foote was an international lawn bowls competitor for New Zealand.

== Bowls career ==
=== World Championships ===
Foote won three gold medals in the triples with Noeleen Scott and Cis Winstanley, the fours with Scott, Winstanley and Verna Devlin and the team event (Taylor Trophy) at the 1973 World Outdoor Bowls Championship in Wellington, New Zealand.

Four years later she won a bronze medal as part of the New Zealand team at the 1977 World Outdoor Bowls Championship in Worthing.

=== National ===
Foote won five National Champion of Champion singles titles and was inducted into the Bowls New Zealand Hall of Fame in 2013.
