= 1981 World Outdoor Bowls Championship =

Bowls championship held in Toronto, Canada

Women's World Outdoor Championships 1981
- 4th Women's World Outdoor Bowls Championships
- Location: Toronto, Canada
- Date: 1 August - 15 August 1981.
- Category: World Bowls Championship

The 1981 Women's World Outdoor Bowls Championship was held at the Willowdale Bowling Club in Toronto, Canada, from 1 to 15 August 1981. Swaziland replaced Samoa two weeks before the competition started due to the Samoan General Strike

Norma Shaw of England won the singles Gold and double world champion Elsie Wilkie struggled with the difficult greens finishing last of 18. The Pairs went to Ireland, the Triples to Hong Kong and the Fours to England. The Taylor Trophy was won by the English team.

== Medallists ==
Event	Gold	Silver	Bronze
Women's singles	(England); Norma Shaw	(Zimbabwe); Flo Kennedy	(Hong Kong); Helen Wong
Women's pairs	Eileen Bell; Nan Allely	(Fiji); Maraia Lum On; Willow Fong	(England); Norma Shaw; Gloria Thomas; Irene Molyneux
Women's triples	(Hong Kong); Rae O'Donnell; Linda King; Lena Sadick	(England); Eileen Fletcher; Mavis Steele; Betty Stubbings	(Zimbabwe); Margaret Mills
Women's fours	(England); Eileen Fletcher; Mavis Steele; Betty Stubbings; Gloria Thomas; Irene Molyneux	(Hong Kong); Joan Humphreys; Rae O'Donnell; Linda King; Lena Sadick	(Israel); Edith Silverman; Molly Skudowitz; Helen Gordon; Rina Lebel; Bernice Pillemer
Women's Team	England	Hong Kong	Zimbabwe

== Results ==
=== Women's singles – round robin ===
Pos	Player	P	W	L	Pts
1	(England) Norma Shaw	17	15	2	30
2	(Zimbabwe) Flo Kennedy	17	13	4	26
3	(Hong Kong) Helen Wong	17	12	5	24
4	Eileen Bell	17	12	5	24
5	(Scotland) Esther Clark	17	11	6	22
6	(United States) Muriel 'Pat' Boehm	17	10	7	20
7	(Fiji) Maraia Lum On	17	10	7	20
8	(Wales) Margaret Pomeroy	17	9	8	18
9	(Israel) Miriam Jankelowitz	17	9	8	18
10	(Eswatini) Sue Hulley	17	8	9	16
11	(Zambia) Sylvia Keeling	17	8	9	16
12	(Australia) Mavis Meadowcroft	17	7	10	14
13	(Canada) Dorothy Randle	17	6	11	12
14	(Guernsey) Dot Foley	17	6	11	12
15	(Malawi) Peggy Chalmers	17	6	11	12
16	(Jersey) Dina Byman	17	5	12	10
17	(Papua New Guinea) Margaret Mitchell	17	3	14	6
18	(New Zealand) Elsie Wilkie	17	3	14	6

=== Women's pairs – round robin ===
Pos	Player	P	W	D	L	Pts
1	Eileen Bell & Nan Allely	17	14	0	3	28
2	(Fiji) Maraia Lum On & Willow Fong	17	12	1	4	25
3	(England) Norma Shaw, Gloria Thomas & Irene Molyneux+	17	12	0	5	24
4	Australia	17	11	0	6	22
5	Wales	17	10	1	6	21
6	(Zimbabwe) Flo Kennedy & another	17	10	0	7	20
7	Guernsey	17	9	0	8	18
8	(Canada) Annette Tidd & Debbie Ballem	17	8	0	9	16
9	(Hong Kong) Helen Wong & Joan Humphreys	17	8	0	9	16
10	(Eswatini) Liz James & another	17	7	1	9	15
11	Scotland	17	7	1	9	15
12	Zambia	17	7	0	10	14
13	(Israel) Miriam Jankelowitz & another	17	7	0	10	14
14	New Zealand	17	7	0	10	14
15	United States	17	6	0	11	12
16	Papua New Guinea	17	5	0	12	10
17	Malawi	17	4	0	13	8
18	Jersey	17	3	0	14	6

+ Injury replacement

=== Women's triples – round robin ===
Pos	Player	P	W	D	L	Pts
1	(Hong Kong) Rae O'Donnell, Linda King & Lena Sadick	17	14	0	3	28
2	(England) Eileen Fletcher, Mavis Steele & Betty Stubbings	17	13	0	4	26
3	(Zimbabwe) Margaret Mills	17	12	1	4	25
4	Scotland	17	11	1	5	23
5	Wales	17	10	1	6	21
6	Australia	17	10	1	6	21
7	Fiji	17	10	0	7	20
8	Zambia	17	9	1	7	19
9	(Canada) Dorothy Randle, Jean Wintermute & Selina Jarvis	17	8	1	8	17
10	Mabel Stewart, Eileen O'Hara & Margaret Dunlop	17	8	1	8	17
11	United States	17	7	0	10	14
12	Israel	17	6	0	11	12
13	New Zealand	17	6	0	11	12
14	Papua New Guinea	17	5	0	12	10
11	Malawi	17	3	1	13	7
12	Guernsey	17	3	1	13	7
13	Jersey	17	2	1	14	5
14	(Eswatini) Cynthia Thompson	17	2	0	15	4

=== Women's fours – round robin ===
Pos	Player	P	W	D	L	Pts
1	(England) Eileen Fletcher, Mavis Steele, Betty Stubbings, Gloria Thomas & Irene Molyneux+	17	13	0	4	26
2	(Hong Kong) Joan Humphreys, Rae O'Donnell, Linda King & Lena Sadick	17	12	0	5	24
3	(Israel) Edith Silverman, Molly Skudowitz, Helen Gordon, Rina Lebel & Bernice Pillemer	17	11	1	5	23
4	(Zimbabwe) Anna Bates, Margaret Mills, Mary Philp & Lucie Olver	17	11	0	6	22
5	(Fiji) Willow Fong, Janki Gaunder	17	11	0	6	22
6	Mabel Stewart, Eileen O'Hara, Margaret Dunlop & Nan Allely	17	10	1	6	21
7	(Wales) Betty Morgan, B Thomas	17	10	0	7	20
8	(Scotland) Cissie McPharland	17	9	0	8	18
9	(Zambia) Kathy Bruce, Ann Meir	17	8	1	8	17
10	(United States) Corinna Folkins, Erma Artist, Lilly Godfrey & Edith MacWilliams	17	8	0	9	16
11	New Zealand	17	8	0	9	16
12	(Papua New Guinea) Maggie Worri	17	7	1	9	15
13	(Australia) Merle Richardson, Shirley Kelly, Dulcie McCollom & Dot Jenkinson	17	6	1	10	13
14	(Malawi) Margaret Penman	17	6	1	10	13
15	(Canada) Annette Tidd, Debbie Ballem, Jean Wintermute & Selina Jarvis	17	6	0	11	12
16	(Jersey) Barbara Le Moignan, Jean Lowery, Doreen Gray, another	17	6	0	11	12
17	(Eswatini) Cynthia Thompson, Liz James	17	4	0	13	8
18	(Guernsey) P Jones	17	4	0	13	8

=== Taylor Trophy ===
Pos	Team	Singles	Pairs	Triples	Fours	Total
1	England	15	24	26	26	91
2	Hong Kong	12	16	28	24	80
3	Zimbabwe	13	20	25	22	80
4	Ireland	12	28	17	21	78
5	Fiji	10	25	20	22	77
6	Wales	9	21	21	20	71
7	Australia	7	22	21	13	63
8	Zambia	8	14	19	17	58
9	Israel	9	14	12	23	58
10	Scotland	11	15	23	18	57
11	United States	10	12	14	16	52
12	Canada	6	16	17	12	51
13	New Zealand	3	14	12	16	45
14	Guernsey	6	18	7	8	39
15	Papua New Guinea	3	10	10	15	38
16	(Eswatini) Swaziland	8	15	4	8	35
17	Malawi	6	8	7	13	34
18	Jersey	5	6	5	12	28
