= Folkins =

Folkins is a surname. Notable people with the surname include:

- Corinna Folkins (1918–1998), American lawn bowler, wife of Dick
- Dick Folkins (1917–1987), American lawn bowler, husband of Corinna
- Jeff Folkins, American physicist
- Lee Folkins (born 1939), American football player
- Lloyd Folkins (1913–1994), Canadian politician
