= Flo Kennedy =

Flo Kennedy may refer to:

- Florynce Kennedy (1916–2000), American lawyer, feminist and civil rights advocate
- Flo Kennedy (bowls), Rhodesian and Zimbabwean international lawn bowler
