= Tan Teck Long =

Singaporean banker

- Education: University of Manchester National University of Singapore
- Occupation: CEO
- Employer: OCBC Bank
- Term: January 2026 –
- Predecessor: Helen Wong

Tan Teck Long (born 1970) is a Singaporean banker and financial services executive, who is the chief executive officer (CEO) of OCBC Bank.

== Education ==
Tan holds a Master of Business Administration from the University of Manchester and a Bachelor of Accountancy with first-class honours from the National University of Singapore.

== Banking career ==
Tan started his career in DBS as a trainee officer in 1993 in its corporate banking department. He later became the head of DBS' real estate banking franchise in 2004 and lead DBS' Institutional Banking business in China from 2011 to 2016. He previously held roles in risk management, including as a senior credit approver, and setting up and heading DBS' loan workout unit. He was later appointed the Chief Risk Officer of DBS starting on 1 July 2018.

Tan joined OCBC in 2022 as the Head of Global Wholesale Banking, and on 1 January 2026 he was appointed Group Chief Executive Officer of OCBC Bank.

== Chairmanships and board memberships ==
Tan serves as a director on the Bank Of Ningbo and Maxwealth Fund Management Company in China.

He also serves as the board commissioner of OCBC Indonesia, and Director of OCBC Malaysia, OCBC Hong Kong, Bank of Singapore and Great Eastern Holdings Limited, and Chairman of the Association of Banks in Singapore, Chairman of ASEAN Bankers Association and Vice Chairman of the Institute of Banking and Finance Singapore (IBF).
