= Joan Humphreys =

Personal information
- Nationality: Hong Konger

Sport
- Sport: Lawn bowls
Medal record
Representing (Hong Kong) Hong Kong
World Outdoor Championships
Silver medal – second place	1981 Toronto	fours
Silver medal – second place	1981 Toronto	team
Asia Pacific Bowls Championships
Silver medal – second place	1987 Lae	pairs

Joan Humphreys is a former Hong Kong international lawn bowler.

== Bowls career ==
Humphreys won double silver in the fours with Rae O'Donnell, Lena Sadick and Linda King and the team event (Taylor Trophy) at the 1981 World Outdoor Bowls Championship in Toronto.

She won a pairs silver medal with Rae O'Donnell at the 1987 Asia Pacific Bowls Championships in Lae.
