= Eileen Smith =

Former international lawn bowls competitor for England

Personal information
- Nationality: British (English)
- Born: 27 April 1917
- Died: 14 September 2002 Worthing, Sussex

Sport
- Sport: Lawn bowls
- Club: Homefield Park BC
Medal record
Representing England
World Outdoor Championships
Silver medal – second place	1973 Wellington	fours
Bronze medal – third place	1973 Wellington	team

Eileen Smith (1917–2002) was an international lawn bowls competitor for England.

== Bowls career ==
In 1973, she won a silver medal in the fours with Phyllis Derrick, Nancie Colling and Joan Sparkes at the 1973 World Outdoor Bowls Championship in Wellington, New Zealand, and also earned a bronze medal in the team event (Taylor Trophy).
