= Nancie Colling =

English bowls player (1919–2020)

Personal information
- Nationality: British (English)
- Born: Florence Nancie Whalley; 19 April 1919 Colwyn Bay, Wales
- Died: 1 July 2020 (aged 101) Seaton, Devon, England

Sport
- Sport: Lawn bowls
- Club: Frome Selwood BC
Medal record
Representing England
World Outdoor Championships
Silver medal – second place	1973 Wellington	fours
Bronze medal – third place	1973 Wellington	team

Florence Nancie Colling MBE (née Whalley) also Nancie Evans (19 April 1919 – 1 July 2020) was an international lawn bowls competitor for England.

== Bowls career ==
Born in Colwyn Bay her family relocated to Somerset. She started bowling in Frome during 1948 and was Secretary of the Frome Selwood Club and the Somerset Ladies Bowling Association. In 1956 she won the first of her four National titles when winning the singles championship. Just two years later she won her second title in 1958, again bowling for Somerset, this was the same year in which she married Harold Evans and then played as Nancie Evans. The third title was the 1965 two wood singles. Widowed in 1959 she remarried to Coryndon Colling in 1967, playing as Nancie Colling afterwards. Remarkably she won the fourth of her National singles titles in 1970, four years after a spine injury had temporarily paralysed her.

In 1973 she was selected for the England team at the 1973 World Outdoor Bowls Championship in Wellington, New Zealand and won a silver medal's in the fours with Phyllis Derrick, Eileen Smith and Joan Sparkes, in addition to winning a bronze medal in the team event (Taylor Trophy).

== Bowls administration ==
In 1976 she became President of the English Women's Bowling Association and four years later served as Secretary of her National Association, a role that was performed for 22 years. She was also the President of the International Women's Bowling Board.

During the 1996 Birthday Honours she was awarded an MBE for services to bowls. Colling was recognised on her 100th birthday in 2019 by Bowls England but she died the following year in 2020 at her care home in Devon.
