= Hazel Harper =

New Zealand lawn bowler

Personal information
- Nationality: New Zealand

Sport
- Sport: Lawn bowls
- Club: Southland BC
Medal record
Representing New Zealand
World Outdoor Bowls Championships
Silver medal – second place	1977 Worthing	triples
Bronze medal – third place	1977 Worthing	team

Hazel Harper is a former New Zealand international lawn bowler.

== Bowls career ==
Harper won a silver medal at the 1977 World Outdoor Bowls Championship in Worthing in the triples event with Cis Winstanley and Pearl Dymond and a bronze medal in the team event (Taylor Trophy).

Harper was first capped in 1977 when bowling for Southland Bowls Club and won 26 caps.
