= Con Newbury =

Papua New Guinean lawn bowler

Personal information
- Nationality: Papua New Guinea

Sport
- Sport: Lawn bowls
Medal record
Representing Papua New Guinea
World Outdoor Championships
| Bronze medal – third place | 1973 Wellington | triples |

Con Newbury is a former Papua New Guinean international lawn bowler.

== Bowls career ==
In 1973 she won the triples bronze medal with Olive Howard and Margaret Ramsbotham at the 1973 World Outdoor Bowls Championship.
