= June Bell =

Canadian international lawn bowler

Personal information
- Nationality: Canada

Sport
- Sport: Lawn bowls
Medal record
Representing Canada
World Outdoor Championships
Silver medal – second place	1977 Worthing	singles

June Bell is a former Canadian international lawn bowler.

== Bowls career ==
=== World Championships ===
Bell won a silver medal in the singles for Canada at the 1977 World Outdoor Bowls Championship in Worthing.

=== National ===
Bell won the 1975 National triples Championship and 1976 National singles Championship. In addition to the two National titles she won the 1976 American Open Championship pairs and the Ontario singles Championship in 1973, 1976 and 1981, and the Ontario triples Championship in 1975.

=== Officiating ===
June Bell was president of Woodstock Lawn Bowling Club in 1966 and 1967 and chaired the Canadian Women's Selection Committee in 1991 and 1992.
