= Louise Godfrey =

Personal information
- Nationality: United States

Sport
- Sport: Lawn bowls
Medal record
Representing United States
World Outdoor Bowls Championships
| Bronze medal – third place | 1977 Worthing | triples |

Louise Godfrey is a former United States international lawn bowler.

== Bowls career ==
Godfrey won a bronze medal at the 1977 World Outdoor Bowls Championship in Worthing in the triples event with Corinna Folkins and Dorothy Bacon.
