= Lilian Nicholas =

Welsh lawn bowls player

Personal information
- Nationality: British (Welsh)
- Born: 24 November 1909 Ebbw Vale, Wales

Sport
- Sport: Bowls
- Club: Sophia Gardens; Ebbw Vale; Nevill
Medal record
Representing Wales
World Outdoor Championships
| Bronze medal – third place | 1977 Worthing | pairs |
| Silver medal – second place | 1977 Worthing | team |
British Isles Championships
| Gold medal – first place | 1972 | singles |

Lilian Nicholas (born 24 November 1909, date of death unknown) was an international lawn and indoor bowls competitor for Wales.

== Bowls career ==
In 1971, she became the first woman to represent Wales at bowls.

In 1977 she won the bronze medal in the pairs at the 1977 World Outdoor Bowls Championship in Worthing with Janet Ackland and a silver medal in the team event (Taylor Trophy).

Nicholas was seven times Welsh singles champion in 1963, 1964, 1967, 1970, 1971, 1978 & 1982 at the Welsh National Bowls Championships. and twice an indoor Welsh triples champion. She was also the inaugural winner of the singles at the British Isles Bowls Championships in 1972.
