= Joan Hunt =

British lawn bowler

Personal information
- Nationality: British (English)

Sport
- Sport: Lawn bowls
- Club: Atherley BC; Farnborough BC & Hampshire
Medal record
Representing England
World Outdoor Championships
| Silver medal – second place | 1977 Worthing | fours |
British Isles Championships
| Gold medal – first place | 1976 | pairs |

Joan Hunt is a former international lawn bowls competitor for England.

== Bowls career ==
In 1977 she won the silver medal in the fours at the 1977 World Outdoor Bowls Championship in Worthing with Joan Sparkes, Margaret Lockwood and Mabel Darlington and also competed in the pairs.

She won the 1969 & 1975 national 2 wood singles title and the 1975 national pairs at the England Women's National Championships when bowling for Atherley BC and Hampshire.

She was a member of Farnborough Bowling Club, holding the office of Ladies President in 1966 & 1967. She was Club Champion three times and won the Ladies' Championship seven times between 1962 and 1972.
