= Joan Osborne (bowls) =

Welsh bowls player

Personal information
- Nationality: Welsh

Sport
- Sport: Bowls
- Club: Howard Gardens BC; Sophia Gardens BC
Medal record
Representing Wales
World Outdoor Championships
| Gold medal – first place | 1977 Worthing | triples |
| Bronze medal – third place | 1977 Worthing | fours |
| Silver medal – second place | 1977 Worthing | team |
British Isles Championships
| Gold medal – first place | 1976 | fours |

Joan Osborne is a former international lawn and indoor bowls competitor for Wales.

== Bowls career ==
=== World Championships ===
In 1977 she won the gold medal in the triples, a bronze medal in the fours with Enid Morgan, Margaret Pomeroy and Janet Ackland and a silver medal in the team event (Taylor Trophy), at the 1977 World Outdoor Bowls Championship in Worthing.

=== National ===
Osborne has won three Welsh National Bowls Championships; the pairs in 1969 and the triples in 1972 and 1987.
