= Lorna Lucas =

Personal information
- Nationality: Australia

Sport
- Club: Avenue Bowls Club
Medal record
Representing Australia
World Outdoor Championships
Gold medal – first place	1973 Wellington	pairs
Bronze medal – third place	1973 Wellington	fours
Silver medal – second place	1973 Wellington	team
Gold medal – first place	1977 Worthing	fours
Gold medal – first place	1977 Worthing	team
Silver medal – second place	1977 Worthing	pairs

Lorna Lucas was an international lawn bowls competitor for Australia.

== Bowls career ==
=== World Championships ===
Lucas won the pairs gold medal with Dot Jenkinson and the fours bronze medal with Joan Vaughan, Olive Rowe and Jenkinson, at the 1973 World Outdoor Bowls Championship in Wellington.

Four years later she won two gold medals and one silver medal at the 1977 World Outdoor Bowls Championship in Worthing. The two gold's were in the fours with Connie Hicks, Jenkinson and Merle Richardson and the team event (Taylor Trophy). The silver was in the pairs with Jenkinson.

=== National ===
She won 23 Avenue Bowls Club titles.
