= Olive Howard =

Former Papua New Guinean international lawn bowler

Personal information
- Nationality: Papua New Guinea

Sport
- Sport: Lawn bowls
Medal record
Representing Papua New Guinea
World Outdoor Championships
Bronze medal – third place	1973 Wellington	triples

Olive Howard is a former Papua New Guinea international lawn bowler.

== Bowls career ==
In 1973 she won the triples bronze medal with Con Newbury and Margaret Ramsbotham at the 1973 World Outdoor Bowls Championship.
