= Margaret Mills (bowls) =

Zimbabwean international lawn bowler

Personal information
- Nationality: Zimbabwe

Sport
- Sport: Lawn bowls
Medal record
Representing Zimbabwe
World Outdoor Bowls Championships
Bronze medal – third place	1981 Toronto	triples
Bronze medal – third place	1981 Toronto	team
Commonwealth Games
Gold medal – first place	1982 Brisbane	triples

Margaret Mills is a former Zimbabwean international lawn bowler.

== Bowls career ==
Mills started bowling in 1964 and won double Bronze at the 1981 World Outdoor Bowls Championship in Toronto in the triples event and team event (Taylor Trophy). The following year she won a historic gold medal for Zimbabwe at the Commonwealth Games because it was the first time that Zimbabwe as a nation competed in the Games.

She played in the team that won the gold medal in the triples event with Anna Bates and Flo Kennedy at the 1982 Commonwealth Games.

Mills went on to compete for Zimbabwe in the fours at both the 1990 and 1994 Commonwealth Games.
