= Linda King (bowls) =

Hong Kong lawn and indoor bowler

Personal information
- Nationality: Hong Kong

Sport
- Sport: Lawn bowls
- Club: United Services Recreation Club
Medal record
Representing (Hong Kong) Hong Kong
World Outdoor Championships
Gold medal – first place	1981 Toronto	triples
Silver medal – second place	1981 Toronto	fours
Silver medal – second place	1981 Toronto	team

Linda King is a former Hong Kong international lawn and indoor bowler.

== Bowls career ==
King won the gold medal in the triples with Rae O'Donnell and Lena Sadick and double silver in the fours with Rae O'Donnell, Lena Sadick and Joan Humphreys and the team event (Taylor Trophy) at the 1981 World Outdoor Bowls Championship in Toronto.

She bowled for the United Services Recreation Club.
