= Dorothy Lewis (bowls) =

Female English international lawn bowler

Personal information
- Nationality: British (English)

Sport
- Sport: Lawn bowls
- Club: Oadby BC

Dorothy Lewis is a former female English international lawn bowler.

== Bowls career ==
Lewis won a National Championship in 1985 when she won the pairs title with Pip Green. The following year she finished runner-up in the National triples.

She represented England at the 1990 Commonwealth Games in the fours event, at the 1990 Commonwealth Games in Auckland, New Zealand.
