= Dorothy Bacon =

American lawn and indoor bowls player

Personal information
- Nationality: American

Sport
- Sport: Lawn bowls
Medal record
Representing United States
World Outdoor Bowls Championships
Bronze medal – third place	1977 Worthing	triples

Dorothy Bacon is an American former international lawn bowler.

== Bowls career ==
Bacon won a bronze medal at the 1977 World Outdoor Bowls Championship in Worthing, England in the triples event with Corinna Folkins and Louise Godfrey.
