= Margaret Pomeroy =

British lawn bowler

Personal information
- Nationality: British (Welsh)

Sport
- Sport: Lawn bowls
- Club: Howard Gardens; Sophia Gardens
Medal record
Representing Wales
World Outdoor Championships
Gold medal – first place	1977 Worthing	triples
Bronze medal – third place	1977 Worthing	fours
Silver medal – second place	1977 Worthing	team
Bronze medal – third place	1988 Auckland	fours
British Isles Championships
Gold medal – first place	1986	pairs
Gold medal – first place	1989	pairs
Gold medal – first place	1976	triples
Gold medal – first place	1981	triples

Margaret Pomeroy is a Welsh former international lawn and indoor bowls competitor.

== Biography ==
In 1977 she won the gold medal in the triples with Enid Morgan and Joan Osborne, bronze medal in the fours with Morgan, Osborne and Janet Ackland and a silver medal in the team event (Taylor Trophy), at the 1977 World Outdoor Bowls Championship in Worthing. In 1980, she took part in the world championship qualifier at the Whitnash Bowls Club for the 1981 World Outdoor Bowls Championship in Canada.

Pomeroy represented the Welsh team at the 1982 Commonwealth Games in Brisbane, Australia, where she competed in the triples event, with Janet Ackland and Gill Miles.

Pomeroy won a bronze medal at the 1988 World Outdoor Bowls Championship in Auckland.

Pomeroy has won 12 titles at the Welsh National Bowls Championships (1965, 1969, 1973, 1976, 1981 singles; 1969, 1975, 1982, 1985, 1988 pairs; 1979, 1985 triples) when bowling for the Howard Gardens and Sophia Gardens Bowls Clubs respectively. and seven indoor National titles, three in the pairs, three in the triples and one in the fours.
