= Lena Sadick =

Personal information
- Nationality: Hong Kong

Sport
- Sport: Lawn bowls
Medal record
Representing (Hong Kong) Hong Kong
World Outdoor Championships
Gold medal – first place	1981 Toronto	triples
Silver medal – second place	1981 Toronto	fours
Silver medal – second place	1981 Toronto	team

Lena Sadick is a former Hong Kong international lawn and indoor bowler.

== Bowls career ==
Sadick won a gold medal in the triples with Rae O'Donnell and Linda King and double silver in the fours with O'Donnell, King and Joan Humphreys and the team event (Taylor Trophy) at the 1981 World Outdoor Bowls Championship in Toronto .
