= Betty Stubbings =

English bowls player

Personal information
- Nationality: British (English)

Sport
- Sport: Lawn bowls
- Club: Pickering BC and Yorkshire (outdoor); Ryedale (indoor)
Medal record
Representing England
World Outdoor Championships
Gold medal – first place	1981 Toronto	fours
Silver medal – second place	1981 Toronto	triples
Gold medal – first place	1981 Toronto	team
Bronze medal – third place	1985 Melbourne	fours
Silver medal – second place	1985 Melbourne	team
Commonwealth Games
Bronze medal – third place	1982 Brisbane	triples
Bronze medal – third place	1986 Edinburgh	pairs

Betty Stubbings was an England international lawn and indoor bowler.

== Bowls career ==
Stubbings was an England International from 1978 until 1992.

In 1980, she took part in the world championship qualifier at the Whitnash Bowls Club for the 1981 World Outdoor Bowls Championship in Canada. After qualifying for the 1981 championships she won two gold medals in the fours with Eileen Fletcher, Mavis Steele, Gloria Thomas and Irene Molyneux and the team event (Taylor Trophy) at the 1981 World Outdoor Bowls Championship in Toronto. Four years later she won a bronze medal in the fours.

Stubbings also won two bronze medals at the Commonwealth Games and won the National Title in 1977.
