= Enid Morgan =

Welsh bowls player

Personal information
- Nationality: Wales
- Born: Enid Hamer; May 1916 Rhondda Valley
- Died: August 1983 (aged 67) Cardiff
- Education: Porth
Medal record
Representing Wales
World Outdoor Championships
Gold medal – first place	1977 Worthing	triples
Bronze medal – third place	1977 Worthing	fours
Silver medal – second place	1977 Worthing	team

Enid Morgan is a Welsh international lawn and indoor bowls competitor for Wales.

== Bowls career ==
In 1977, Morgan won the gold medal in the triples with Margaret Pomeroy and Joan Osborne, a bronze medal in the fours with Pomeroy, Osborne and Janet Ackland, at the 1977 World Outdoor Bowls Championship in Worthing and a silver medal in the team event (Taylor Trophy).
