= Eileen Fletcher =

English lawn bowls competitor (died 2019)

Personal information
- Nationality: British (English)
- Died: 2019

Sport
- Sport: Lawn bowls
- Club: Poole Park BC
Medal record
Representing England
World Outdoor Championships
Gold medal – first place	1981 Toronto	fours
Silver medal – second place	1981 Toronto	triples
Gold medal – first place	1981 Toronto	team

Eileen Fletcher (née King) was an international lawn bowls competitor for England.

== Bowls career ==
In 1980, King took part in the world championship qualifier at the Whitnash Bowls Club for the 1981 World Outdoor Bowls Championship in Canada. After qualifying for the 1981 championships she won two gold medals in the fours with Mavis Steele, Betty Stubbings, Gloria Thomas and Irene Molyneux and team event (Taylor Trophy) and a silver medal in the triples at the 1981 World Outdoor Bowls Championship in Toronto.

As Eileen King national singles title in 1973 and the national singles 2 wood champion in 1976. She was also the 2 wood runner-up in 1978. She married Thoams Fletcher in 1976 to become Eileen Fletcher.
