= Olive Rowe =

Former international lawn bowls competitor for Australia

Personal information
- Nationality: Australia

Sport
- Sport: Lawn bowls
Medal record
Representing Australia
World Outdoor Championships
Silver medal – second place	1973 Wellington	triples
Bronze medal – third place	1973 Wellington	fours
Silver medal – second place	1973 Wellington	team

Olive Rowe is a former international lawn bowls competitor for Australia.

== Bowls career ==
In 1973 she won three medals at the 1973 World Outdoor Bowls Championship in Wellington. A silver medal in the triples with Joan Vaughan and Mary Underwood, a bronze medal in the fours with Vaughan, Lorna Lucas and Dot Jenkinson and another silver medal in the team event (Taylor Trophy).
