= Norma de la Motte =

PNG lawn bowler

Personal information
- Nationality: Papua New Guinea

Sport
- Sport: Lawn bowls
- Club: Port Moresby BC
Medal record
Representing Papua New Guinea
World Outdoor Championships
Bronze medal – third place	1977 Worthing	singles

Norma de la Motte is a former Papua New Guinea international lawn bowler.

== Bowls career ==
De la Motte won a bronze medal in the singles for Papua New Guinea at the 1977 World Outdoor Bowls Championship in Worthing. She was selected for the Championships after winning the National singles and pairs in 1976.
