= Liz James (bowls) =

Personal information
- Full name: Elizabeth Spence James
- Nationality: EmaSwati
- Born: 17 September 1944 (age 81)

Sport
- Sport: Lawn bowls
- Club: TransNamib BC
Medal record
Representing Eswatini
World Singles Champion of Champions
Gold medal – first place	2003 Moama, Australia	Women's event

Elizabeth Spence James (born 17 September 1944) is a retired international lawn bowls player from eSwatini who was the 2003 World Singles Champion of Champions and began bowling in 1977.

== Bowls career ==
=== World Championships ===
James has competed for Swaziland (called eSwatini today) at four World Bowls Championships in 1981, 1985, 1992 and 1996. James has represented Swaziland at four Commonwealth Games in 1986, 1990, 1994 and 2006. In 2003 she became the World Singles Champion of Champions defeating Alison Merrien of Guernsey in the final.
