= Mary Underwood =

Australian lawn bowls competitor

Personal information
- Nationality: Australia

Sport
- Sport: Lawn bowls
- Club: Civic Centre BC
Medal record
Representing Australia
World Outdoor Championships
Bronze medal – third place	1973 Wellington	singles
Silver medal – second place	1973 Wellington	triples
Silver medal – second place	1973 Wellington	team

Mary Underwood is a former international lawn bowls competitor for Australia.

== Bowls career ==
In 1973 she won three medals at the 1973 World Outdoor Bowls Championship in Wellington. A bronze medal in the singles, a silver medal in the triples with Joan Vaughan and Olive Rowe and another silver medal in the team event (Taylor Trophy).

Underwood made her state debut in 1967 for Western Australia and bowled for the Civic Centre Bowls Club.
