= Rina Lebel =

Israeli international lawn bowler

Personal information
- Native name: רינה לבל
- Nationality: Israel

Sport
- Sport: Lawn bowls
Medal record
Representing (Israel) Israel
World Outdoor Championships
Bronze medal – third place	1981 Toronto	fours

Rina Lebel (Hebrew: רינה לבל) is a former Israeli international lawn bowler.

== Bowls career ==
Lebel won a bronze medal in the fours with Edith Silverman, Helen Gordon, Molly Skudowitz and Bernice Pillemer at the 1981 World Outdoor Bowls Championship in Toronto.
