= Edith Silverman =

Personal information
- Native name: אדית סילברמן
- Nationality: Israel

Sport
- Sport: Lawn bowls
Medal record
Representing (Israel) Israel
World Outdoor Championships
Bronze medal – third place	1981 Toronto	fours

Edith Silverman (Hebrew: אדית סילברמן) is a former Israeli international lawn bowler.

== Bowls career ==
Silverman won a bronze medal in the fours with Molly Skudowitz, Helen Gordon, Rina Lebel and Bernice Pillemer at the 1981 World Outdoor Bowls Championship in Toronto.
