= Elvie Chok =

Hong Kong lawn Bowler

Personal information
- Nationality: Hong Konger
- Born: 1924
- Died: 24 April 2015 (aged 90–91)

Sport
- Club: Hong Kong Police Sports Association
Medal record
Representing (Hong Kong) Hong Kong
World Outdoor Championships
Gold medal – first place	1977 Worthing	pairs

Elvie Chok was a Hong Kong international lawn and indoor bowler.

== Career ==
Chok won a gold medal in the 1977 World Outdoor Bowls Championship pairs, in Worthing with Helen Wong.

She died in 2015.

Her sons Philip Chok and Edwin Chok were both international players.
