= 1973 World Outdoor Bowls Championship =

Lawn bowls event

Women's World Outdoor Championships 1973
- 2nd Women's World Outdoor Bowls Championships
- Location: Wellington, New Zealand
- Date: 3–18 December 1973.
- Category: World Bowls Championship

The 1973 Women's World Outdoor Bowls Championship was held at the Victoria Bowls Club in Wellington, New Zealand, from 3 to 18 December 1973.

Elsie Wilkie won the singles which was held in a round robin format. The pairs was won by Australia whilst the triples, fours Gold and Taylor Trophy all went to New Zealand.

== Medallists ==
Event	Gold	Silver	Bronze
Women's singles	(New Zealand); Elsie Wilkie	(England); Mavis Steele	(Australia); Mary Underwood
Women's pairs	(Australia); Lorna Lucas; Dot Jenkinson	(England); Mavis Steele; Phyllis Derrick	(Papua New Guinea); Gladys Doyle; Betty Glassey
Women's triples	(New Zealand); Irene Foote; Noeleen Scott; Cis Winstanley	(Australia); Mary Underwood; Joan Vaughan; Olive Rowe	(Papua New Guinea); Con Newbury; Olive Howard; Margaret Ramsbotham
Women's fours	(New Zealand); Irene Foote; Noeleen Scott; Cis Winstanley; Verna Devlin	(England); Nancie Colling; Eileen Smith; Joan Sparkes; Phyllis Derrick	(Australia); Joan Vaughan; Olive Rowe; Dot Jenkinson; Lorna Lucas
Women's team	New Zealand	Australia	England

== Results ==
=== Women's singles – round robin ===
Round	Tie 1	Tie 2	Tie 3	Tie 4
Round 1	Nzl 22 Eng 13	Can 23 Fij 16	Aus 22 USA 3	Ire 23 PNG 18
Round 2	Nzl 21 Can 15	PNG 21 Aus 17	Eng 21 Fij 3	Ire 21 USA 19
Round 3	Nzl 21 Ire 4	Eng 21 Can 15	Aus 21 Fij 14	USA 21 PNG 10
Round 4	Nzl 21 Aus 20	Can 21 PNG 15	Fij 21 Ire 13	Eng 21 USA 3
Round 5	Nzl 21 USA 17	Can 21 Ire 20	Eng 21 Aus 17	PNG 21 Fij 5
Round 6	Nzl 21 Fij 12	USA 21 Can 17	Aus 21 Ire 13	Eng 21 PNG 17
Round 7	Aus 21 Can 12	Nzl 21 PNG 18	Fij 21 USA 15	Eng 22 Ire 6

Pos	Player	P	W	L	Pts
1	(New Zealand) Elsie Wilkie	7	7	0	14
2	(England) Mavis Steele	7	6	1	12
3	(Australia) Mary Underwood	7	4	2	8
4	(Canada) Anne Flook	7	3	2	6
5	(Fiji) Maureen Watson	7	2	5	4
6	Sadie Little	7	2	5	4
7	(Papua New Guinea) Gladys Doyle	7	2	5	4
8	(United States) Muriel Pat Boehm	7	2	5	4

=== Women's pairs – round robin ===
Round	Tie 1	Tie 2	Tie 3	Tie 4
Round 1	Aus 24 USA 14	PNG 20 Ire 20	Fij 21 Can 18	Eng 22 Nzl 20
Round 2	Aus bt PNG	Eng bt Can	Ire bt USA	Nzl bt Fij
Round 3	Eng 22 Fij 11	Ire 31 Can 16	Aus 27 Nzl 13	PNG 25 USA 14
Round 4	Aus 40 Can 6	Nzl 35 Ire 14	Eng 23 PNG 10	Fij 18 USA 15
Round 5	Aus 31 Fij 16	PNG 23 Nzl 21	Can 31 USA 10	Ire 22 Eng 20
Round 6	Aus 30 Ire 10	PNG 26 Fij 17	Nzl 26 Can 6	Eng 21 USA 12
Round 7	Eng 21 Aus 14	Fij 26 Ire 17	PNG 23 Can 13	Nzl 35 USA 10

Pos	Player	P	W	D	L	Pts
1	(Australia) Lorna Lucas & Dot Jenkinson	7	6	0	1	12
2	(England) Mavis Steele & Phyllis Derrick	7	6	0	1	12
3	(Papua New Guinea) Gladys Doyle & Betty Glassey	7	4	1	2	9
4	(New Zealand) Elsie Wilkie & Verna Devlin	7	4	0	3	8
5	Sadie Little & Jean Hayes	7	3	1	3	7
6	(Fiji) Maureen Watson & T Hughes	7	3	0	4	6
7	(Canada) Anne Flook & Olive Parker	7	1	0	6	2
8	(United States) Dorothy Mumma & Muriel Pat Boehm	7	0	0	7	0

=== Women's triples – round robin ===
Round	Tie 1	Tie 2	Tie 3	Tie 4
Round 1	Aus 15 USA 19	PNG 21 Ire 14	Fij 25 Can 19	Eng 18 Nzl 19
Round 2	Nzl bt Fij	Aus bt PNG	Eng bt Can	Ire bt USA
Round 3	Ire 31 Can 19	PNG 44 USA 11	Nzl 17 Aus 13	Eng 30 Fij 11
Round 4	Aus 26 Can 13	USA 29 Fij 14	Nzl 22 Ire 18	Eng 25 PNG 20
Round 5	Aus 20 Fij 17	PNG 26 Nzl 9	USA 26 Can 18	Eng 18 Ire 8
Round 6	Aus 20 Ire 19	PNG 37 Fij 11	Nzl 45 Can 5	Eng 24 USA 20
Round 7	Eng 16 Aus 22	Fij 17 Ire 17	PNG 20 Can 15	Nzl 24 USA 15

Pos	Player	P	W	D	L	Pts
1	(New Zealand) Irene Foote, Noeleen Scott, Cis Winstanley	7	6	0	1	12
2	(Australia) Mary Underwood, Joan Vaughan, Olive Rowe	7	5	0	2	10
3	(Papua New Guinea) Con Newbury, Olive Howard, Margaret Ramsbotham	7	5	0	2	10
4	(England) Nancie Colling, Eileen Smith, Joan Sparkes	7	4	1	2	9
5	(United States) B Service, Pageen Barker, Betty Ewen	7	3	1	3	7
6	A Patton, R Wilson, M Ross	7	2	1	4	5
7	(Fiji) A Wright, L Browne, R Forster	7	1	1	5	3
8	(Canada) I Todd, Mary Pollard, Dorothy Weeks	7	0	0	7	0

+ more shots

=== Women's fours – round robin ===
Round	Tie 1	Tie 2	Tie 3	Tie 4
Round 1	Nzl 21 Eng 15	Aus 31 USA 12	Fij 22 Can 14	Ire 22 PNG 12
Round 2	Nzl 31 Can 9	Aus 33 PNG 15	Eng 26 Fij 10	Ire 23 USA 16
Round 3	Nzl 38 Ire 18	Eng 38 Can 16	Fij 26 Aus 14	PNG 24 USA 9
Round 4	Aus 24 Nzl 18	Fij 21 Ire 19	Can 21 PNG 24	Eng 23 USA 18
Round 5	Fij 15 PNG 26	Nzl 21 USA 9	Ire 29 Can 14	Aus 19 Eng 19
Round 6	Nzl 31 Fij 10	USA 29 Can 22	Aus 18 Ire 16	Eng 21 PNG 17
Round 7	Aus 33 Can 10	Nzl 17 PNG 16	USA 22 Fij 17	Eng 16 Ire 15

Pos	Player	P	W	D	L	Pts
1	(New Zealand) Irene Foote, Noeleen Scott, Cis Winstanley & Verna Devlin	7	6	0	1	12
2	(England) Nancie Colling, Eileen Smith, Joan Sparkes & Phyllis Derrick	7	5	1	1	11
3	(Australia) Joan Vaughan, Olive Rowe, Dot Jenkinson & Lorna Lucas	7	5	1	1	11
4	A Patton, R Wilson, M Ross, Jean Hayes	7	3	0	4	6
5	(Fiji) T Hughes, A Wright, L Browne, R Forster	7	3	0	4	6
6	(Papua New Guinea) Con Newbury, Olive Howard, Margaret Ramsbotham, Betty Glassey	7	3	0	4	6
7	(United States) B Service, Pageen Barker, Betty Ewen, Dorothy Mumma	7	2	0	5	4
8	(Canada) Olive Parker, I Todd, Mary Pollard, Dorothy Weeks	7	0	0	7	0

=== Taylor Trophy ===
Pos	Player	Singles	Pairs	Triples	Fours	Total
1	New Zealand	4	1	4	4	13
2	Australia	2	4	3	1	11
3	England	3	3	1	2	9
4	Papua New Guinea	0	2	2	0	4
5	Ireland	0	0	0	1	1
6	Canada	1	0	0	0	1
