= Mabel Darlington =

Canadian-born English lawn bowls player (1916–1999)

Personal information
- Nationality: British (English)
- Born: 5 December 1916 Toronto, Ontario, Canada
- Died: 1999 (aged 82–83) Nuneaton, England

Sport
- Sport: Lawn bowls
- Club: Nuneaton BC
Medal record
Representing England
World Outdoor Championships
Silver medal – second place	1977 Worthing	fours

Mabel Phoebe Darlington (5 December 1916 – 1999) was a Canadian-born international lawn bowls competitor for England.

== Bowls career ==
In 1977 she won the silver medal in the fours at the 1977 World Outdoor Bowls Championship in Worthing with Margaret Lockwood, Joan Hunt and Joan Sparkes.

After taking up bowls in 1951 she won the 1961 national 2 wood singles title at the England Women's National Championships when bowling for Warwickshire.

Also won the Leamington Open four times.
