= Bernice Pillemer =

Israeli lawn bowler

Personal information
- Native name: ברניס פילמר
- Nationality: Israel

Sport
- Sport: Lawn bowls
- Club: Netanya BC
Medal record
Representing (Israel) Israel
World Outdoor Championships
Bronze medal – third place	1981 Toronto	fours

Bernice Pillemer (Hebrew: ברניס פילמר) is a former Israeli international lawn bowler.

== Bowls career ==
Pillemer won a bronze medal in the fours with Edith Silverman, Molly Skudowitz, Helen Gordon and Rina Lebel at the 1981 World Outdoor Bowls Championship in Toronto.
