= Janet Ackland =

Welsh bowls player (1938–2019)

Personal information
- Nationality: British (Welsh)
- Born: 19 December 1938
- Died: 21 December 2019 (aged 81) University Hospital Llandough, Penarth

Sport
- Sport: Bowls
- Club: Penarth Belle Vue BC
Medal record
Representing Wales
World Outdoor Championship
| Bronze medal – third place | 1977 Worthing | pairs |
| Bronze medal – third place | 1977 Worthing | fours |
| Silver medal – second place | 1977 Worthing | team |
| Gold medal – first place | 1988 Auckland | singles |
Commonwealth Games
| Bronze medal – third place | 1994 Victoria | pairs |
British Isles Championships
| Gold medal – first place | 1989 | fours |
| Gold medal – first place | 1990 | fours |

Janet Ackland (1938–2019) was a Welsh international lawn and indoor bowler.

== Bowls career ==
=== World Championships ===
Ackland won two bronze medals and a silver medal at the 1977 World Outdoor Bowls Championship; the silver medals came in the pairs with Lilian Nicholas and the fours with Joan Osborne, Enid Morgan and Margaret Pomeroy, the silver medal was in the team event (Taylor Trophy).

Eleven years later the pinnacle of her long career came when she took the singles gold medal at the 1988 World Outdoor Bowls Championship in Auckland.

=== Commonwealth Games ===
Ackland competed at four successive Commonwealth Games and in the 1994 Commonwealth Games she won a bronze in the pairs with Ann Dainton.

=== National ===
Ackland began bowling in 1959 and won her first title at Llandrindod Wells in 1969 and was the 1980 and 1987 Welsh National Bowls Championships singles champion. She has been a member of the Welsh International bowling team since 1973, winning 100 indoor and outdoor caps. She was also the captain of her country's team.

=== Awards ===
Ackland is a member of the Welsh Sports Hall of Fame.

== Sources ==
- Ffaith
- Welsh Sports Hall of Fame Inductees, Bowls
