= Anna Bates (bowls) =

Zimbabwean international lawn bowler

Personal information
- Nationality: Zimbabwe
Medal record
Representing Zimbabwe
World Outdoor Bowls Championships
Bronze medal – third place	1981 Toronto	team
Commonwealth Games
Gold medal – first place	1982 Brisbane	triples

Anna Bates is a former Zimbabwean international lawn bowler.

== Bowls career ==
Bates won a historic gold medal for Zimbabwe at the Commonwealth Games because it was the first time that Zimbabwe as a nation competed in the Games.

She played in the team that won the gold medal in the triples event with Flo Kennedy and Margaret Mills at the 1982 Commonwealth Games.
