= Verna Devlin =

Personal information
- Nationality: New Zealand

Sport
- Sport: Lawn bowls
- Club: Herne Bay BC/Carlton BC
Medal record
Representing New Zealand
World Outdoor Championships
Gold medal – first place	1973 Wellington	fours
Gold medal – first place	1973 Wellington	team

Verna Devlin is a former international lawn bowls competitor for New Zealand.

== Bowls career ==
She won the fours gold medal at the 1973 World Outdoor Bowls Championship in Wellington, New Zealand. She also won the gold medal in the team event (Taylor Trophy).

Devlin won the 1982 singles title and the 1971 pairs title at the New Zealand National Bowls Championships when bowling for the Herne Bay Bowls Club.

== Awards ==
Devlin was inducted into the Bowls New Zealand Hall of Fame in 2013.
