= Phyllis Derrick =

Former international lawn bowls competitor for England

Personal information
- Nationality: British (English)
- Born: c.1922

Sport
- Sport: Lawn bowls
- Club: Magdalen Park BC
Medal record
Representing England
World Outdoor Championships
Silver medal – second place	1973 Wellington	pairs
Silver medal – second place	1973 Wellington	fours
Bronze medal – third place	1973 Wellington	team
British Isles Championships
Gold medal – first place	1981	singles

Phyllis Derrick (born c.1922) is a former international lawn bowls competitor for England.

Derrick was born Phyllis Jones, her father was the Wales international bowler, W.E. Jones, and her mother also competed for Wales.

== Bowls career ==
In 1973 she won two silver medals, one in the pairs with Mavis Steele and one in the fours with Nancie Colling, Eileen Smith, and Joan Sparkes, at the 1973 World Outdoor Bowls Championship in Wellington, New Zealand. She also earned a bronze medal in the team event (Taylor Trophy). In 1980, she took part in the world championship qualifier at the Whitnash Bowls Club for the 1981 World Outdoor Bowls Championship in Canada.

In addition to the World Championship medals she won two singles titles in 1970 (two wood) and 1980 (four wood) and the 1966 pairs title at the England Women's National Championships when bowling for Magdalen Park Bowls Club, Surrey. She also won the singles at the British Isles Bowls Championships in 1981.
