= Helen Wong =

Personal information
- Nationality: Hong Kong
- Born: 1925
- Died: 25 March 2012

Sport
- Club: Craigengower CC Bowling Club
Medal record
Representing (Hong Kong) Hong Kong
World Outdoor Championships
Gold medal – first place	1977 Worthing	pairs
Bronze medal – third place	1981 Toronto	singles
Silver medal – second place	1981 Toronto	team
Silver medal – second place	1985 Melbourne	triples
Asia Pacific Bowls Championships
Bronze medal – third place	1985 Tweed Heads	singles

Helen Wong (1925-2012) was a Hong Kong international lawn and indoor bowler.

== Bowls career ==
Wong won a gold medal in the 1977 World Outdoor Bowls Championship pairs in Worthing with Elvie Chok. Four years later she won a bronze medal in the singles and a silver medal in the team event (Taylor Trophy) at the 1981 World Outdoor Bowls Championship in Toronto. In 1985 she won a third world medal when winning a silver medal in the triples at the 1985 World Outdoor Bowls Championship in Melbourne with Sandra Zakoske and Rae O'Donnell.

She won the singles bronze medal at the inaugural 1985 Asia Pacific Bowls Championships.

Wong played bowls at the Craigengower CC Bowls Club and won the National singles title seven times in 1958, 1960, 1962, 1963, 1971, 1974 & 1978. She died in 2012.
