= Flo Kennedy (bowls) =

Former international lawn bowler

Personal information
- Nationality: (Rhodesia) Zimbabwe

Sport
- Sport: Lawn bowls
Medal record
Representing Zimbabwe
World Outdoor Championships
Silver medal – second place	1981 Toronto	singles
Bronze medal – third place	1981 Toronto	team
Commonwealth Games
Gold medal – first place	1982 Brisbane	triples

Florence 'Flo' Kennedy is a former Rhodesian and Zimbabwean international lawn bowler.

== Bowls career ==
=== World Championship ===
Kennedy started bowling in 1964 and won two medals at the 1981 World Outdoor Bowls Championship in Toronto; a silver medal in the singles and a bronze medal in the team event (Taylor Trophy).

=== Commonwealth Games ===
Kennedy won an historic gold medal for Zimbabwe at the Commonwealth Games because it was the first time that Zimbabwe as a nation competed in the Games.

She skipped the team and won the gold medal in the triples event with Anna Bates and Margaret Mills. This led to her being voted Zimbabwe Sportsperson of the Year in 1982.

In 1973 she won a bronze medal (with Thelma Ault and Lucie Oliver) at the South African Games and is a four times national singles champion. In 1975 she lost in the South African Masters final at Pretoria to Lucie Oliver and lost the Oliver again the following year in the Rhodesian Masters final.
