= Jeff Folkins =

Jeffrey Joseph Folkins is an American physicist.

Folkins earned a degree in physics from Harvey Mudd College in 1976 and later attended the University of Pennsylvania, graduating with a doctorate in December 1981. He subsequently worked for Xerox during which he became an author on more than 150 U.S. patents. In 1999, Folkins was elected a fellow of the American Physical Society "[f]or applications of physics to electrophotography resulting in major innovations in the design of development subsystems and in color Xerographic marking systems."
