= Dot Jenkinson =

Australian international lawn bowls competitor

Personal information
- Nationality: Australia

Sport
- Club: Red Cliffs Bowls Club
Medal record
Representing Australia
World Outdoor Championships
Gold medal – first place	1973 Wellington	pairs
Bronze medal – third place	1973 Wellington	fours
Silver medal – second place	1973 Wellington	team
Gold medal – first place	1977 Worthing	fours
Gold medal – first place	1977 Worthing	team
Silver medal – second place	1977 Worthing	pairs

Dot Jenkinson was an international lawn bowls competitor for Australia.

== Bowls career ==
=== World Championships ===
Jenkinson won the pairs gold medal with Lorna Lucas and the fours bronze medal with Joan Vaughan, Olive Rowe and Lorna Lucas, at the 1973 World Outdoor Bowls Championship in Wellington.

Four years later she won two gold medals and a silver medal at the 1977 World Outdoor Bowls Championship in Worthing. The two gold's were in the fours with Connie Hicks, Lorna Lucas and Merle Richardson and the team event (Taylor Trophy). The silver was in the pairs with Lucas.

=== National ===
She won six Australian National Bowls Championships in the fours and secured 22 Red Cliffs Bowls Club Championship wins in the singles.
