= Rae O'Donnell =

Personal information
- Nationality: Hongkonger

Sport
- Sport: Lawn bowls
- Club: Kowloon CC
Medal record
Representing (Hong Kong) Hong Kong
World Outdoor Championships
| Gold medal – first place | 1981 Toronto | triples |
| Silver medal – second place | 1981 Toronto | fours |
| Silver medal – second place | 1981 Toronto | team |
| Silver medal – second place | 1985 Melbourne | triples |
| Bronze medal – third place | 1988 Auckland | triples |
Asia Pacific Bowls Championships
| Bronze medal – third place | 1985 Tweed Heads | triples |
| Silver medal – second place | 1987 Lae | pairs |
| Silver medal – second place | 1993 Victoria | fours |

Rae O'Donnell is a former Hong Kong international lawn and indoor bowler.

== Bowls career ==
O'Donnell won a gold medal at the 1981 World Outdoor Bowls Championship in Toronto in the triples with Lena Sadick and Linda King and a silver medal in the team event (Taylor Trophy). In 1985 she won a silver medal in the triples at the 1985 World Outdoor Bowls Championship in Melbourne with Sandra Zakoske and Helen Wong. She won a third triples medal at the 1988 World Outdoor Bowls Championship in Auckland after securing a bronze medal with Zakoske and Naty Rozario.

She won three medals at the Asia Pacific Bowls Championships.

She was national singles champion in 1991, pairs champion in 1985, 1987 & 1991, triples champion 1990 & 1991 and fours champion 1980, 1990 & 1991.
