= Gloria Thomas =

British lawn bowler

Personal information
- Nationality: British (English)
- Born: 1943 (age 82–83) Helston, England

Sport
- Sport: Lawn bowls
- Club: West Cornwall
Medal record
Representing England
World Outdoor Championships
| Gold medal – first place | 1981 Toronto | fours |
| Bronze medal – third place | 1981 Toronto | pairs |
| Gold medal – first place | 1981 Toronto | team |
British Isles Championships
| Gold medal – first place | 1979 | pairs |

Gloria Thomas is a former international lawn and indoor bowls competitor for England.

== Bowls career ==
In the 1960s, Thomas set up a ladies' section for her local bowling club in Helston. Thomas won the National Championships pairs title in 1978 with Anne Pascoe.

In 1980, she took part in the world championship qualifier at the Whitnash Bowls Club for the 1981 World Outdoor Bowls Championship in Canada. After qualifying for the 1981 championships she won two gold medals in the fours with Eileen Fletcher, Mavis Steele, Betty Stubbings and Irene Molyneux and the team event (Taylor Trophy) and the bronze medal in the pairs at the 1981 World Outdoor Bowls Championship in Toronto. In 2003, she competed in the National Express EBWA triples championship.
