= Noeleen Scott =

New Zealand lawn bowler

Personal information
- Born: Noeleen Mollison Thomson; 31 October 1926
- Died: 5 October 2023 (aged 96) Cromwell, New Zealand

Sport
- Country: New Zealand
- Sport: Lawn bowls
- Club: Cromwell Bowling Club

Achievements and titles
- National finals: Singles champion (1977)
Medal record
Women's lawn bowls
Representing New Zealand
World Outdoor Championships
Gold medal – first place	1973 Wellington	Triples
Gold medal – first place	1973 Wellington	Fours
Gold medal – first place	1973 Wellington	Team

Noeleen Mollison Scott (née Thomson; 31 October 1926 – 5 October 2023) was a New Zealand lawn bowls player. She won world triples and fours titles in 1973, and was inducted into the Bowls New Zealand Hall of Fame in 2013.

== Early life and family ==
Scott was born Noeleen Mollison Thomson on 31 October 1926, the daughter of Georgina Elsie and Harry Cuthbert Thomson. The family lived in Mosgiel, and her mother died in January 1930. She married Bill Scott, who was a member of the Cromwell Bowling Club and won the nation pairs title in 1964.

== Bowls career ==
Having seen her husband play bowls, Scott decided to take up the sport. She quickly rose through the playing ranks, and finished second in the singles at the 1965 national bowls championship. She went on to win the national singles title in 1977, and was again runner-up in 1981.

Scott won the triples and fours gold medals at the 1973 World Outdoor Bowls Championship in Wellington. She also won the gold medal in the team event (Taylor Trophy).

Scott was a member of the Cromwell Bowling Club for almost 50 years, until failing eyesight forced her retirement from the sport. During her playing career, she won 41 club titles and 17 Central Otago titles. In 2013, she was an inaugural inductee into the Bowls New Zealand Hall of Fame.

Scott died in Cromwell on 5 October 2023, having been predeceased by her husband.
