= World Indoor Championships =

The World Indoor Championships may refer to:

- World Athletics Indoor Championships (formerly IAAF World Indoor Championships), biennial track and field competition
- UCI Indoor Cycling World Championships, annual track cycling competition
- World Indoor Archery Championships, biennial archery competition
- World Indoor Bowls Championships, annual lawn bowl competition
- World Indoor Lacrosse Championship, quadrennial lacrosse competition

== See also ==
- World championship
