= Doreen Hankin =

British lawn bowler

Personal information
- Nationality: British (English)

Sport
- Club: Egham BC; Egham IBC
Medal record
Representing England
Atlantic Bowls Championships
Gold medal – first place	2005 Bangor	triples
Gold medal – first place	2005 Bangor	fours
British Isles Championships
Gold medal – first place	1995	triples
Gold medal – first place	2017	fours

Doreen Hankin is an English international lawn and indoor bowler.

== Bowls career ==
In 2005 she won the triples and fours gold medals at the Atlantic Bowls Championships.

Hankin has won two English National titles at the English National Bowls Championships winning the women's triples in 1994 and the women's fours in 2016. On both occasions this qualified her for the British Isles Bowls Championships and she subsequently won both events.
