= Helen Gordon (bowls) =

Personal information
- Native name: הלן גורדון
- Nationality: Israel

Sport
- Sport: Lawn bowls
Medal record
Representing (Israel) Israel
World Outdoor Championships
Bronze medal – third place	1981 Toronto	fours

Helen Gordon (Hebrew: הלן גורדון) is a former Israeli international lawn bowler.

== Bowls career ==
Gordon won a bronze medal in the fours with Edith Silverman, Molly Skudowitz, Rina Lebel and Bernice Pillemer at the 1981 World Outdoor Bowls Championship in Toronto.
