= Brenda Atherton =

English international lawn and indoor bowler (born 1934)

Personal information
- Nationality: British (English)
- Born: 1934 (age 91–92) Nottingham, Nottinghamshire, England

Sport
- Sport: Bowls
- Club: Forest Oaks, Nottingham
Medal record
Representing England
World Outdoor Championships
Bronze medal – third place	1985 Melbourne	fours
Silver medal – second place	1985 Melbourne	team
Commonwealth Games
Bronze medal – third place	1986 Edinburgh	fours
Bronze medal – third place	1994 Victoria	pairs

Brenda Atherton (born 1934) is a former England international lawn and indoor bowler. She is a founding member of Bowls England.

== Bowls career ==
Atherton won a bronze medal in the fours at the 1985 World Outdoor Bowls Championship in Melbourne. She won two bronze medals at the Commonwealth Games; she was selected for England in the fours, at the 1986 Commonwealth Games in Edinburgh, Scotland and represented England in the pairs event, at the 1994 Commonwealth Games in Victoria, British Columbia, Canada.

She also won three National Titles ranging from 1972 until 2010. They were the Two wood singles in 1972 and 2001 and the fours in 2010.
