= Elsie Wilkie =

New Zealand lawn bowls player

Elsie Wilkie MBE
Personal information
- Born: Elsie Hamer Fielden; 20 December 1922 Waihou, New Zealand
- Died: 29 November 1995 (aged 72) Matamata, New Zealand
- Spouse: Robert Caldwell Wilkie (m. 1943)

Sport
- Club: Walton Bowling Club; Matamata Bowling Club
Medal record
Representing New Zealand
Women's lawn bowls
World Outdoor Championships
| Gold medal – first place | 1973 Wellington | singles |
| Gold medal – first place | 1973 Wellington | team |
| Gold medal – first place | 1977 Worthing | singles |
| Bronze medal – third place | 1977 Worthing | team |

Elsie Hamer Wilkie MBE (née Fielden, 20 December 1922 – 29 November 1995) was a New Zealand lawn bowls player who represented her country internationally.

== Bowls career ==
She was born in Waihou, near Te Aroha.

She won the singles gold medal at the 1973 World Outdoor Bowls Championship in Wellington, New Zealand in addition to the team gold (Taylor Trophy), and four years later successfully defended her title when taking singles gold again at the 1977 World Outdoor Bowls Championship in Worthing, England. An additional bronze medal was won in the team event.

She won the 1966, 1970 & 1971 singles titles and the 1969 & 1980 pairs title at the New Zealand National Bowls Championships when bowling for the Walton and Matamata Bowls Club respectively.

== Honours and awards ==
In the 1979 New Year Honours, Wilkie was appointed a Member of the Order of the British Empire, for services to bowling.

In 1990, Wilkie was the first woman bowler to be inducted into the New Zealand Sports Hall of Fame.
