= Molly Skudowitz =

Personal information
- Native name: מולי סקודוביץ
- Nationality: Israel

Sport
- Sport: Lawn bowls
- Club: Netanya BC
Medal record
Representing (Israel) Israel
World Outdoor Championships
| Bronze medal – third place | 1981 Toronto | fours |

Molly Skudowitz (Hebrew: מולי סקודוביץ) is a former Israeli international lawn bowler.

== Bowls career ==
Skudowitz won a bronze medal in the fours with Edith Silverman, Helen Gordon, Rina Lebel and Bernice Pillemer at the 1981 World Outdoor Bowls Championship in Toronto.

== Personal life ==
She was married to fellow international bowler Sam Skudowitz.
