= Wendy Line =

British lawn bowler

Wendy Line (née Clarke)
Personal information
- Nationality: British (English)

Sport
- Club: Southampton BC
Medal record
Representing England
World Outdoor Championships
Bronze medal – third place	1988 Auckland	pairs
Gold medal – first place	1988 Auckland	team
Silver medal – second place	1996 Leamington Spa	singles
Silver medal – second place	1996 Leamington Spa	team
Commonwealth Games
Gold medal – first place	1986 Auckland	singles
British Isles Championships
Gold medal – first place	1986	triples

Wendy Line (née Clarke) is an English international lawn and indoor bowler.

== Bowls career ==
Line only started bowling at the age of 40 but won a bronze medal in the pairs at the 1988 World Outdoor Bowls Championship in Auckland.

Her greatest achievement came in the 1986 Commonwealth Games in Auckland when she won the gold medal in the women's singles. She represented England in the singles event, at the 1990 Commonwealth Games in Auckland and four years later represented England in the fours event, at the 1994 Commonwealth Games in Victoria, British Columbia, Canada.

Under her maiden name of Clarke she won the 1981 National fours and the 1982 national singles. In 1985, she won the national triples title, bowling for Southampton BC.

== Personal life ==
In 1984, she married fellow international bowler Peter Line, who died in 2025.
