= Cis Winstanley =

New Zealand lawn bowls competitor

Cis Winstanley MBE
Personal information
- Born: Cissie Lithgow; 26 December 1908 Egremont, Cumberland, England
- Died: 25 July 2006 (aged 97)

Sport
- Country: New Zealand
- Sport: Lawn bowls
- Club: Marewa BC
Medal record
Women's lawn bowls
Representing New Zealand
World Outdoor Championships
Gold medal – first place	1973 Wellington	triples
Gold medal – first place	1973 Wellington	fours
Gold medal – first place	1973 Wellington	team
Silver medal – second place	1977 Worthing	triples
Bronze medal – third place	1977 Worthing	team

Cissie Winstanley MBE (née Lithgow, 26 December 1908 – 25 July 2006) was an international lawn bowls competitor for New Zealand.

== Bowls career ==
She won the triples and fours gold medal at the 1973 World Outdoor Bowls Championship in Wellington, New Zealand and also won the gold medal in the team event (Taylor Trophy). Four years later she won a silver medal in the triples at the 1977 World Outdoor Bowls Championship in Worthing, England. An additional bronze medal was won in the team event.

Winstanley won 15 New Zealand National Bowls Championships; (Singles – 1965, 1968, 1973; Pairs – 1957, 1958, 1959, 1965, 1984; Fours – 1958, 1959, 1961, 1963, 1968, 1977, 1978) all when bowling for the Marewa Bowls Club.

== Honours and awards ==
In the 1975 Queen's Birthday Honours, Winstanley was appointed a Member of the Order of the British Empire, for services to bowling. She was inducted into the New Zealand Sport Hall of Fame in 1996.
