= Lynne Whitehead =

English lawn bowler

Lynne Bowen (nee Whitehead)
Personal information
- Nationality: British (English)
- Born: 12 March 1973 (age 53) Norwich, England

Sport
- Club: Norfolk Bowling Club
Medal record
lawn bowls
Representing England
Commonwealth Games
| Bronze medal – third place | 2002 Manchester | pairs |
World Indoor Championships
| Gold medal – first place | 2003 Yarmouth | Mixed Pairs |
Atlantic Bowls Championships
| Gold medal – first place | 2007 Ayr | triples |
British Isles Championships
| Gold medal – first place | 1995 | Junior Singles |
| Gold medal – first place | 2007 | triples |
| Gold medal – first place | 2007 | fours |

Lynne Maria Bowen (nee Whitehead) (born 1973) is an English international lawn bowler.

== Bowls career ==
She was born in 1973 and won the bronze medal in the pairs with Amy Gowshall at the 2002 Commonwealth Games in Manchester.

In 2007 she won the triples gold medal at the Atlantic Bowls Championships.

She bowled for the Norfolk Bowling Club until 2003 and has won six English National titles (the 2006 triples and 2006 fours and the junior singles in 1994 & 1998). The 2009 Pairs with Jeannie Baker and 2011 Champion of Champions Singles. She subsequently won the 1995 Junior singles and 2007 triples and fours at the British Isles Bowls Championships.

She won the World Indoor Mixed Pairs in 2003 with Tony Allcock.
