= Corinna Folkins =

American lawn bowler

Personal information
- Nationality: United States
- Born: 24 December 1918 Los Angeles
- Died: 29 January 1998 (aged 79) Mission Viejo, California

Sport
- Sport: Lawn bowls
- Club: Casta del Sol BC
Medal record
Representing United States
World Outdoor Bowls Championships
Bronze medal – third place	1977 Worthing	triples

Corinna Helen Folkins, née MacDonald (1918–1998), was a United States international lawn bowler.

== Bowls career ==
=== World Championships ===
Folkins won a bronze medal at the 1977 World Outdoor Bowls Championship in Worthing, in the triples event with Dorothy Bacon and Louise Godfrey.

=== National ===
Folkins was the 1981 pairs national champion and the Southwest Division American Women's Lawn Bowls Association (AWLBA) president while bowling for the Casta del Sol Bowls Club.

== Personal life ==
She married fellow international bowler Dick Folkins in 1947.
