= Irene Molyneux =

English lawn bowls player (1923–2019)

Personal information
- Nationality: British (English)
- Born: Q4 1922 Abingdon-on-Thames, Oxfordshire
- Died: 27 June 2019 (aged 96) Abingdon-on-Thames, Oxfordshire

Sport
- Sport: Lawn bowls
- Club: Oxford City and County BC
Medal record
Representing England
World Outdoor Championships
Gold medal – first place	1981 Toronto	fours
Bronze medal – third place	1981 Toronto	pairs
Gold medal – first place	1981 Toronto	team
British Isles Championships
Gold medal – first place	1977	pairs

Emily Irene Molyneux (née Drew) (1922–2019) was an international lawn bowls competitor for England.

== Bowls career ==
In 1981 Molyneux won double gold in the fours with Eileen Fletcher, Mavis Steele, Betty Stubbings and Gloria Thomas and the team event (Taylor Trophy) and a bronze medal in the pairs at the 1981 World Outdoor Bowls Championship in Toronto.

Molyneaux won seven National Championships titles; 1976 (pairs), 1979 (two wood singles), 1974, 1979, 1991, 1996 (triples) and fours (1986). She also won the British Isles Bowls Championships pairs title in 1977 with Margaret Lockwood.

Her husband Jim was President of the Oxford City and County Bowls Club in 1976.
