= Margaret Lockwood (bowls) =

England international lawn bowler

Personal information
- Nationality: British (English)
- Born: 29 April 1927 Thame, Oxfordshire
- Died: 18 December 2020 (aged 93)

Sport
- Sport: Lawn bowls
- Club: Oxford City & County BC
Medal record
Representing England
World Outdoor Championships
Silver medal – second place	1977 Worthing	fours
British Isles Championships
Gold medal – first place	1977	pairs

Margaret E. Lockwood (née Janaway) (29 April 1927 – 18 December 2020) was an international lawn bowls competitor for England.

== Bowls career ==
In 1977, she won the silver medal in the fours at the 1977 World Outdoor Bowls Championship in Worthing with Joan Sparkes, Joan Hunt and Mabel Darlington and also competed in the triples.

Lockwood won the 1976 pairs title and the 1974 and 1979 triples titles, at the England Women's National Championships when bowling for Oxfordshire, in addition to being runner-up on four more occasions.

In 1989, she was president of the English Women's Indoor Bowling Association.
