= Catherine Popple =

English international lawn bowler

Catherine Popple (née Catherine Anton)
Personal information
- Nationality: British (English)
- Born: Catherine Ivy Anton; 5 May 1965 (age 61)

Sport
- Club: Parkway BC; Peterborough & District BC
Medal record
Representing England
Lawn bowls
Commonwealth Games
Bronze medal – third place	1998 Kuala Lumpur	fours
Atlantic Bowls Championships
Silver medal – second place	1999 Cape Town	fours
British Isles Championships
Gold medal – first place	2006	triples
Gold medal – first place	2005	fours
Gold medal – first place	2008	fours

Catherine Ivy Popple née Anton (born 5 May 1965) is a former English international lawn bowler. Popple was an England international for 26 years, representing her country from 1987 to 2012.

== Bowls career ==
Anton represented England in the fours event, at the 1994 Commonwealth Games in Victoria, British Columbia, Canada.

In 1998 she represented England at the 1998 Commonwealth Games in Kuala Lumpur and won a bronze medal in the fours event with Norma Shaw, Mandy Jacklin and Shirley Page.

In 1999 she won the fours silver medal at the Atlantic Bowls Championships.

Anton is also an eleven times national champion representing Huntingdonshire, one singles, one pairs, one triples, four fours and four junior.

In 2024, Popple was appointed as a national selector for Bowls England.

== Personal life ==
She married fellow bowler Stuart Popple.
