= Mavis Steele =

British lawn bowler

Mavis Steele MBE
Personal information
- Nationality: British (English)
- Born: 9 September 1928 Kenton, Middlesex, England
- Died: 1998 Surrey, England

Sport
- Sport: Lawn bowls
- Club: Sunbury Sports Club BC; Egham IBC
Medal record
Representing England
World Outdoor Championships
| Silver medal – second place | 1973 Wellington | pairs |
| Silver medal – second place | 1973 Wellington | singles |
| Bronze medal – third place | 1973 Wellington | team |
| Gold medal – first place | 1981 Toronto | fours |
| Silver medal – second place | 1981 Toronto | triples |
| Gold medal – first place | 1981 Toronto | team |
| Bronze medal – third place | 1985 Melbourne | fours |
| Silver medal – second place | 1985 Melbourne | team |
Commonwealth Games
| Bronze medal – third place | 1982 Brisbane | Triples |

Mavis Mary Steele MBE (1928-1998) was an England international lawn bowler.

== Personal life ==
Mavis was born in Kenton, Middlesex on 9 September 1928. She was a data preparation manager by trade.

== Bowls career ==
In 1973 she secured a double silver at the 1973 World Outdoor Bowls Championship in Wellington, New Zealand in the singles and the pairs with Phyllis Derrick. Eight years later she her finest moment came when claiming double gold in the fours with Eileen Fletcher, Betty Stubbings, Gloria Thomas and Irene Molyneux and the team event (Taylor Trophy), during the 1981 World Outdoor Bowls Championship in Toronto.

Mavis was twice selected to represent England at the Commonwealth Games; the first in 1982 in Brisbane where she won a bronze medal in the triples with Norma Shaw and Betty Stubbings and the second in 1990.

She won eight outdoor National titles; the singles in 1961, 1962 and 1969, the pairs in 1964 & 1971, the triples in 1968 and the fours in 1963 & 1969. She played for Sunbury Sports Club outdoors and the Egham club indoors.

== Awards ==
Steele was appointed a Member of the Order of the British Empire (MBE) in the 1983 New Year Honours for services to women's bowls.
