= Joan Sparkes =

English lawn bowls player (born 1916)

Personal information
- Nationality: British (English)
- Born: 25 July 1916 Brightlingsea, England

Sport
- Sport: Lawn bowls
- Club: Central Park BC
Medal record
Representing England
World Outdoor Championships
Silver medal – second place	1973 Wellington	fours
Bronze medal – third place	1973 Wellington	team
Silver medal – second place	1977 Worthing	fours

Joan Emily Sparkes (née Southgate; born 25 July 1916) was an English international lawn bowls competitor.

== Bowls career ==
Joan Emily Southgate was born in Brightlingsea, Essex on 25 July 1916. In 1938, she married Leslie A. Sparkes (a county player and butcher by trade). She was introduced to the sport by her husband and took up bowls in 1954 at Burnham-on-Crouch.

Sparkes won the 1966 & 1972 triples title at the England Women's National Championships when bowling for Essex.

In 1973 she won the silver medal in the fours at the 1973 World Outdoor Bowls Championship in Wellington, New Zealand and also earned a bronze medal in the team event (Taylor Trophy). Four years later she won another silver medal in the fours at the 1977 World Outdoor Bowls Championship in Worthing with Margaret Lockwood, Joan Hunt and Mabel Darlington.
