= 2016 World Outdoor Bowls Championship – Women's pairs =

World Outdoor Championships 2016 women's pairs
- 13th World Outdoor Bowls Championships
- Location: Christchurch, New Zealand
- Date: 29 November – 11 December 2016
- Category: 2016 World Outdoor Bowls Championship

The 2016 World Outdoor Bowls Championship women's pairs was held at the Burnside Bowling Club in Avonhead, Christchurch, New Zealand, from 6 to 11 December 2016.

The women's pairs gold medal was won by Laura Daniels and Jess Sims of Wales.

== Section tables ==
=== Section 1 ===
Team	Player	P	W	D	L	Pts	Shots
1	(New Zealand) Angela Boyd, Jo Edwards	9	8	0	1	16	+83
2	(Australia) Karen Murphy, Kelsey Cottrell	9	6	0	3	12	+62
3	(England) Sophie Tolchard, Ellen Falkner	9	6	0	3	12	+54
4	(Philippines) Ainie Knight, Sonia Bruce	9	5	0	4	10	+58
5	(Cyprus) Linda Ryan, Fran Davis	9	5	0	4	10	0
6	(Israel) Shira Eshel, Tami Kamzel	9	5	0	4	10	−16
7	(Canada) Shirley Fitzpatrick-Wong, Jackie Foster	9	4	0	5	8	9
8	(Netherlands) Saskia Schaft, Guurtje Copier	9	3	0	6	6	−46
9	(Namibia) Anjuleen Viljoen, Lesley Vermeulen	9	2	0	7	4	−103
10	(Singapore) Jane Low, Josephine Lim	9	1	0	8	2	−101

=== Section 2 ===
Team	Player	P	W	D	L	Pts	Shots
1	(Wales) Laura Daniels, Jess Sims	9	8	0	1	16	+94
2	(Scotland) Lauren Baillie, Lesley Doig	9	8	0	1	16	+58
3	(Malaysia) Siti Zalina Ahmad, Emma Firyana Saroji	9	6	0	3	12	+42
4	(Norfolk Island) Shae Wilson, Carmen Anderson	9	5	0	4	10	+46
5	(South Africa) Colleen Piketh, Nici Neal	9	5	0	4	10	+25
6	Sarah‑Jane Curran, Catherine Beattie	9	5	0	4	10	−2
7	(Spain) Carol Broomfield, Christine Mawson	9	3	0	6	6	−81
8	(Hong Kong) Vivian Yip, Dorothy Yu	9	2	0	7	4	−22
9	(Cook Islands) Linda Vavia, Teokotai Jim	9	2	0	7	4	−93
10	(China) Song Suzhen, Yu Xiaoyan	9	1	0	8	2	−67

== Finals ==
Play Offs
New Zealand	bye
Australia	12
England	17
Wales	bye
Scotland	20
Malaysia	5

Semifinals
New Zealand	13
England	11
Wales	20
Scotland	11

Gold medal
New Zealand	15
Wales	16

== Results ==
women's pairs Section 1
Round 1 – 6 Dec		
New Zealand	Cyprus	28–9
Australia	Singapore	37–8
England	Netherlands	17–6
Philippines	Canada	23–13
Israel	Namibia	18–11
Round 2 – 6 Dec		
New Zealand	Philippines	19–14
Australia	Netherlands	27–12
Israel	Cyprus	17–12
Canada	Namibia	26–9
Singapore	England	17–13
Round 3 – 6 Dec		
New Zealand	Australia	24–7
England	Israel	26–6
Philippines	Singapore	20–7
Cyprus	Namibia	25–11
Netherlands	Canada	19–18
Round 4 – 7 Dec		
New Zealand	Canada	22–12
Australia	Philippines	17–10
Cyprus	Netherlands	20–15
Israel	Singapore	18–12
Namibia	England	12–11
Round 5 – 7 Dec		
New Zealand	Netherlands	17–15
Australia	Israel	18–11
Philippines	Namibia	34–5
England	Canada	18–10
Cyprus	Singapore	22–14
Round 6 – 7 Dec		
New Zealand	Singapore	21–13
Australia	Namibia	37–7
Philippines	Netherlands	23–8
England	Cyprus	25–12
Canada	Israel	21–12
Round 7 – 8 Dec		
New Zealand	Namibia	26–7
Australia	England	17–15
Cyprus	Canada	23–17
Israel	Philippines	17–12
Netherlands	Singapore	17–12
Round 8 – 8 Dec		
New Zealand	Israel	17–7
England	Philippines	17–15
Cyprus	Australia	20–10
Canada	Singapore	29–8
Netherlands	Namibia	19–16
Round 9 – 8 Dec		
England	New Zealand	22–15
Philippines	Cyprus	22–15
Israel	Netherlands	15–8
Canada	Australia	17–16
Namibia	Singapore	25–10

women's pairs Section 2
Round 1 – 6 Dec		
Wales	China	25–9
Scotland	Ireland	17–8
South Africa	Hong Kong	19–15
Norfolk Island	Malaysia	18–16
Spain	Cook Islands	14–13
Round 2 – 6 Dec		
Wales	Ireland	32–9
Scotland	China	18–11
South Africa	Spain	17–10
Norfolk Island	Cook Islands	27–4
Malaysia	Hong Kong	21–17
Round 3 – 6 Dec		
Wales	Spain	25–7
Scotland	Cook Islands	25–14
South Africa	China	24–10
Malaysia	Ireland	20–8
Hong Kong	Norfolk Island	20–15
Round 4 – 7 Dec		
Wales	Malaysia	16–10
Scotland	Hong Kong	20–18
Norfolk Island	Ireland	17–13
South Africa	Cook Islands	31–9
Spain	China	18–16
Round 5 – 7 Dec		
Wales	Hong Kong	24–8
Scotland	South Africa	17–9
Norfolk Island	Spain	29–8
Malaysia	China	16–14
Ireland	Cook Islands	28–10
Round 6 – 7 Dec		
Wales	South Africa	23–11
Scotland	Spain	22–12
Malaysia	Cook Islands	29–2
Ireland	Hong Kong	18–15
China	Norfolk Island	19–16
Round 7 – 8 Dec		
Wales	Scotland	22–13
Malaysia	Spain	27–11
South Africa	Norfolk Island	17–13
Ireland	China	16–7
Cook Islands	Hong Kong	21–17
Round 8 – 8 Dec		
Wales	Cook Islands	18–11
Scotland	Norfolk Island	22–17
Malaysia	South Africa	16–12
Ireland	Spain	20–6
Hong Kong	China	17–9
Round 9 – 8 Dec		
Scotland	Malaysia	22–7
Norfolk Island	Wales	20–7
Ireland	South Africa	17–15
Spain	Hong Kong	19–17
Cook Islands	China	21–9
