= Jersey at the 2010 Commonwealth Games =

Sporting event delegation

Flag of Jersey

Jersey competed in the 2010 Commonwealth Games held in Delhi, India, from 3 to 14 October 2010.

Thirty-one athletes were named in the team after original nominees Mariana Agathangelou and Elizabeth Cann elected to compete for England instead.

== Aquatics ==
=== Swimming ===
Team Jersey consisted of 1 swimmer.

Ian Black

== Archery ==
Team Jersey consisted of 2 archers.

Micheal Coward, Lucy O'Sullivan

== Athletics ==
Team Jersey consisted of 2 athletes.

Zane Duquemin, Kathryn Rothwell

== Badminton ==
Team Jersey consisted of 2 badminton players.

Kimberley Ashton, Solenn Pasturel

== Cycling ==
Team Jersey consisted of 3 cyclists.

Robin Ovenden, Chris Spence, Richard Tanguy.

== Lawn Bowls ==
Team Jersey consisted of 12 lawn bowls players over 6 events

Men: Cyril Renouf, Derek Boswell, Allan Quernard, Malcolm De Sousa, John Lowery, Michael Rive.
Women: Sue Noel, Christine Grimes, Helen Greechan, Karina Bisson, Rachel Macdonald, Joan Renouf.

== Shooting ==
Team Jersey consisted of 6 shooters.

Bruce Horwood, Daniel Richardson, Steven Le Couilliard, Marc Yates, Andrew De La Haye, Mary Norman.

== Squash ==
Team Jersey consisted of 3 squash players.

Kate Cadigan, Jeannine Cowie, Michael Hopkins.

== See also ==
- Jersey at the 2006 Commonwealth Games
