= Lawn bowls at the 2018 Commonwealth Games – Women's triples =

Lawn bowls competition at the 2018 Commonwealth Games, Australia

Lawn bowls – Women's triples at the 2018 Commonwealth Games
- Venue: Broadbeach Bowls Club
- Dates: 9 – 12 April 2018
- Competitors: 54 from 18 nations

Medalists
gold medal	Carla Krizanic; Natasha Scott; Rebecca Van Asch	Australia
silver medal	Caroline Brown; Kay Moran; Stacey McDougall	Scotland
bronze medal	Ellen Falkner; Katherine Rednall; Sian Honnor	England

Lawn bowls women's triples at the 2018 Commonwealth Games was held at the Broadbeach Bowls Club in the Gold Coast, Australia from April 9 to 12. A total of 54 athletes from 18 associations participated in the event. Australia won the gold medal, defeating Scotland in the final. England the bronze medal.

== Sectional play ==
The top two from each section advance to the knockout stage.

=== Section A ===
Rank	Nation	Athletes	MP	MW	MT	ML	FR	AG	PD	PTS
1	Australia	Carla Krizanic, Natasha Scott, Rebecca Van Asch	4	4	0	0	96	45	51	12
2	Canada	Jackie Foster, Joanna Cooper, Pricilla Westlake	4	2	0	2	62	59	3	6
3	Papua New Guinea	Ju Carlo, Loa Babona, Piwen Karkar	4	2	0	2	49	83	-34	6
4	India	Farzana Khan, Nayanmoni Saikia, Pinki	4	1	0	3	60	68	-8	3
5	Fiji	Litia Tikoisuva, Loreta Kotoisuva, Radhika Prasad	4	1	0	3	63	75	-12	3

	Australia	Canada	Papua New Guinea	India	Fiji
Australia	—	20–13	32–12	20–11	24–9
Canada	13–20	—	11–14	19–10	19–15
Papua New Guinea	12–32	14–11	—	6–24	17–16
India	11–20	10–19	24–6	—	15–23
Fiji	9–24	15–19	16–17	23–15	—

=== Section B ===
Rank	Nation	Athletes	MP	MW	MT	ML	FR	AG	PD	PTS
1	New Zealand	Katelyn Inch, Mandy Boyd, Tayla Bruce	4	4	0	0	89	50	39	12
2	Wales	Anwen Butten, Caroline Taylor, Emma Woodcock	4	3	0	1	71	60	11	9
3	Jersey	Doreen Moon, Eileen Vowden, Joan Renouf	4	2	0	2	56	66	-10	6
4	Namibia	Johanna van den Bergh, Lesley Vermeulen, Sheena Du Toit	4	1	0	3	60	61	-1	3
5	Zambia	Getrude Siame, Mildred Mkandawire, Sophia Matipa	4	0	0	4	53	92	-39	0

	New Zealand	Wales	Jersey	Namibia	Zambia
New Zealand	—	19–15	24–8	22–15	24–12
Wales	15–19	—	18–7	15–14	23–20
Jersey	8–24	7–18	—	15–12	26–12
Namibia	15–22	14–15	12–15	—	19–9
Zambia	12–24	20–23	12–26	9–19	—

=== Section C ===
Rank	Nation	Athletes	MP	MW	MT	ML	FR	AG	PD	PTS
1	Malaysia	Auni Fathiah, Azlina Arshad, Nur Fidrah Noh	3	3	0	0	61	37	24	9
2	Scotland	Caroline Brown, Kay Moran, Stacey McDougall	3	2	0	1	54	36	18	6
3	Cook Islands	Jacquelin Purea, Teokotai Jim, Tiare Jim	3	1	0	2	49	59	-10	3
4	Norfolk Island	Christine Jones, Christine Pauling, Tessie Evans	3	0	0	3	33	65	-32	0

	Malaysia	Scotland	Cook Islands	Norfolk Island
Malaysia	—	17–10	20–14	24–13
Scotland	10–17	—	28–10	16–9
Cook Islands	14–20	10–28	—	25–11
Norfolk Island	13–24	9–16	11–25	—

=== Section D ===
Rank	Nation	Athletes	MP	MW	MT	ML	FR	AG	PD	PTS
1	England	Ellen Falkner, Katherine Rednall, Sian Honnor	3	3	0	0	86	24	+62	9
2	Northern Ireland	Donna McNally, Erin Smith, Sarah McAuley	3	2	0	1	50	36	+14	6
3	South Africa	Elma Davis, Esme Kruger, Johanna Snyman	3	1	0	2	64	49	+15	2
4	Niue	Chris Hipa, Ku Ioane, Pilena Motufoou	3	0	0	3	19	110	-91	0

	England	Northern Ireland	South Africa	Niue
England	—	16–8	28–11	42–5
Northern Ireland	8–16	—	14–13	28–7
South Africa	11–28	13–14	—	40–7
Niue	5–42	7–28	7–40	—

== Knockout stage ==
Quarterfinals
A1	Australia	30
D2	Northern Ireland	5
D1	England	16
B2	Wales	11
B1	New Zealand	16
A2	Canada	18
C1	Malaysia	15
C2	Scotland	17

Semifinals
A1	Australia	16
D1	England	13
A2	Canada	7
C2	Scotland	19

Finals
A1	Australia	21
C2	Scotland	12
Third place
D1	England	20
A2	Canada	12
