= Bowls at the 2004 Commonwealth Youth Games =

Lawn Bowls at the II Commonwealth Youth Games
- Dates: 1 – 3 December
- Host city: Bendigo, Australia
- Venue: Bendigo Bowls Club
- Events: 4
- Participation: 28 athletes from 7 nations

At the 2004 Commonwealth Youth Games, the lawn bowls events were held at Bendigo Bowls club in Bendigo, Australia from 1 to 3 December.

Seven nations took place in boys singles, girls single, mixed doubles, with all scores counting towards an overall team event.

The winners were decided from a round robin format of seven games, with points carried forward to the overall team result. In the singles competition, the first player to score 21 points will win. In the mixed doubles, the team that has amassed the most points over 21 ends will secure the win - draws are possible in this format.

== Medal table ==
* Host nation ( AUS)

Rank	Nation	Gold	Silver	Bronze	Total
1	AUS*	3	1	0	4
2	MAS	1	0	0	1
3	SCO	0	2	0	2
4	ENG	0	1	1	2
5	NZL	0	0	3	3
Totals (5 entries)		4	4	4	12

== Roster ==
Participating teams and rosters
Australia	Scotland	New Zealand	England	Malaysia	Northern Ireland	Samoa
Alex Murtagh; Brody Pitham; Rebecca Quail; Georgia White	Martyn Rice	Shannon McIlroy; Matthew Gallop; Clare Hendra; Katie Scott	Sam Tolchard; Jamie Chestney; Sian Honnor			

== Boys Singles ==
A round robin stage took place to decide the overall winner. All games were played first to 21.

Rank	Team	Points	Leg Difference
1st place, gold medalist(s)	Australia	10	+37
2nd place, silver medalist(s)	England	8	+32
3rd place, bronze medalist(s)	New Zealand	8	+28
4	Scotland	8	+6
5	Northern Ireland	4	-7
6	Malaysia	4	-21
7	Samoa	0	-75

- Australia 21-13 Malaysia
- England 21-13 New Zealand
- Scotland 21-13 Samoa

- England 21-17 Northern Ireland
- Malaysia 21-11 Samoa
- New Zealand 21-8 Scotland

- Australia 21-13 New Zealand
- England 21-11 Malaysia
- Scotland 21-18 Northern Ireland

- Northern Ireland 21-17 Australia
- New Zealand 21-8 Samoa
- Scotland 21-11 Malaysia

- Australia 21-8 Samoa
- Scotland 21-17 England
- New Zealand 21-13 Northern Ireland

- Australia 21-15 England
- Northern Ireland 21-10 Samoa
- New Zealand 21-11 Malaysia

- Australia 21-15 Scotland
- (England) Australia 21-1 Samoa
- Malaysia 21-14 Northern Ireland

== Girls Singles ==
A round robin stage took place to decide the overall winner. All games were played first to 21.

Rank	Team	Points	Leg Difference
1st place, gold medalist(s)	Malaysia	10	+37
2nd place, silver medalist(s)	Australia	8	+37
3rd place, bronze medalist(s)	New Zealand	8	+35
4	Scotland	8	+12
5	England	6	+6
6	Northern Ireland	2	-39
7	Samoa	0	-88

- Australia 21-4 England
- Malaysia 21-8 Northern Ireland
- Scotland 21-4 Samoa

- England 21-12 New Zealand
- Malaysia 21-17 Australia
- Scotland 21-15 Northern Ireland

- Australia 21-4 Samoa
- Scotland 21-16 England
- Malaysia 21-14 New Zealand

- Australia 21-5 Northern Ireland
- New Zealand 21-4 Samoa
- Scotland 21-19 Malaysia

- New Zealand 21-9 Australia
- Malaysia 21-19 England
- Northern Ireland 21-11 Samoa

- Australia 21-18 Scotland
- England 21-7 Samoa
- New Zealand 21-14 Northern Ireland

- England 21-14 Northern Ireland
- Malaysia 21-8 Samoa
- New Zealand 21-6 Scotland

== Mixed Doubles ==
A round robin stage took place to decide the overall winner. All games were played to 21 legs with the points amassed creating a final score.

Rank	Team	Points	Leg Difference
1st place, gold medalist(s)	Australia	10	+56
2nd place, silver medalist(s)	Scotland	9	+32
3rd place, bronze medalist(s)	England	8	+28
4	New Zealand	6	+15
5	Malaysia	5	+18
6	Northern Ireland	4	+0
7	Samoa	0	-149

- Australia 27-17 Northern Ireland
- England 17-12 Malaysia
- New Zealand 45-8 Samoa

- Australia 23-17 England
- Malaysia 44-7 Samoa
- Scotland 16-14 Northern Ireland

- Australia 29-9 Samoa
- Scotland 16-16 Malaysia
- New Zealand 26-10 Northern Ireland

- Scotland 22-13 Australia
- England 13-12 Northern Ireland
- Malaysia 16-12 New Zealand

- Australia 23-9 Malaysia
- England 29-16 Samoa
- New Zealand 17-16 Scotland

- Australia 21-6 New Zealand
- Scotland 20-15 England
- Northern Ireland 33-8 Samoa

- England 27-7 New Zealand
- Scotland 24-7 Samoa
- Northern Ireland 20-16 Malaysia

== Team ==
All results were gathered throughout the competitions to create an overall team winner

Rank	Team	Points	Leg Difference
1st place, gold medalist(s)	Australia	28	+130
2nd place, silver medalist(s)	Scotland	25	+50
3rd place, bronze medalist(s)	New Zealand	22	+78
4	England	22	+66
5	Malaysia	19	+34
6	Northern Ireland	10	-46
7	Samoa	0	-312
