= 2004 World Outdoor Bowls Championship – Women's singles =

Lawn bowls event

World Outdoor Championship 2004 women's singles
- 10th World Outdoor Bowls Championships
- Location: Leamington Spa, England
- Date(s): 3–17 September 2004
- Category: World Bowls Championship

The 2004 World Outdoor Bowls Championship women's singles was held at Victoria Park, Leamington Spa in England.

Originally the championships were going to take place in Kuala Lumpur, Malaysia, during 2003 but due to political reasons it was moved to England the following year.

Margaret Johnston of Ireland won the singles gold medal.

== Section tables ==
First round 4 sections, top two teams qualify for quarter finals.

=== Section A ===
Pos	Player	P	W	L	Pts	Shots
1	Margaret Johnston	7	7	0	14	+73
2	(England) Shirley Page	7	5	2	10	+45
3	(Canada) Clarice Fitzpatrick	7	5	2	10	+16
4	(Netherlands) Guurtje Ros-Copier	7	4	3	8	+21
5	(Norfolk Island) Anne Pledger	7	3	4	6	-28
6	(Spain) Patsy Fisher	7	2	5	4	-37
7	(Namibia) Elaine Krahenbuh	7	1	6	2	-32
8	(Portugal) Janeth Gomez de Rocha	7	1	6	2	-58

=== Section B ===
Pos	Player	P	W	L	Pts	Shots
1	(Wales) Betty Morgan	6	5	1	10	+45
2	(Scotland) Margaret Letham	6	5	1	10	+43
3	(Botswana) Lebo Maroke	6	4	2	8	+9
4	(Fiji) Radhika Prasad	6	3	3	6	-3
5	(Zambia) Hilda Luipa	6	2	4	4	+1
6	(Japan) Junko Tahara	6	1	5	2	-47
7	(Guernsey) Jennifer Nicolle	6	1	5	2	-48

=== Section C ===
Pos	Player	P	W	L	Pts	Shots
1	(Israel) Ruthie Gilor	6	4	2	8	+34
2	(Australia) Karen Murphy	6	4	2	8	+13
3	(United States) Anne Nunes	6	4	2	8	-1
4	(Malaysia) Siti Zalina Ahmad	6	3	3	6	+23
5	(New Zealand) Marlene Castle	6	3	3	6	+7
6	(Hong Kong) Dannie Chiu	6	2	4	4	-7
7	(Isle of Man) Maureen Payne	6	1	5	2	-69

=== Section D ===
Pos	Player	P	W	L	Pts	Shots
1	(South Africa) Lorna Trigwell	6	5	1	10	+48
2	(Philippines) Carmen Anderson	6	4	2	8	+14
3	(Zimbabwe) Jane Rigby	6	3	3	6	+12
4	(Eswatini) Dawn Squires	6	3	3	6	+7
5	(Thailand) Songsin Tsao	6	3	3	6	-5
6	(Jersey) Alison Camacho	6	2	4	4	-36
7	(India) Renu Mohta	6	1	5	2	-40

== Finals ==
Play Offs
Johnston	21
(Australia) Murphy	6
(Wales) Morgan	21
(Philippines) Anderson	9
(South Africa) Trigwell	21
(England) Page	16
(Scotland) Letham	21
(Israel) Gilor	10

Semifinals
Johnston	21
(Wales) Morgan	14
(South Africa) Trigwell	21
(Scotland) Letham	14

Gold medal
Johnston	21
(South Africa) Trigwell	9
Third place
(Scotland) Letham	21
(Wales) Morgan	9

== Results ==
Women's singles section A
Round 1 – September 11		
Netherlands	England	21–12
Ireland	Portugal	21–10
Norfolk Island	Spain	21–14
Canada	Namibia	21–5
Round 2 – September 11		
England	Canada	21–17
Ireland	Norfolk Island	21–6
Netherlands	Namibia	21–8
Spain	Portugal	21–15
Round 3 – September 12		
Ireland	Canada	21–7
England	Norfolk Island	21–8
Portugal	Namibia	21–17
Spain	Netherlands	21–16
Round 4 – September 12		
Ireland	Namibia	21–9
England	Spain	21–9
Netherlands	Norfolk Island	21–8
Canada	Portugal	21–11
Round 5 – September 13		
Ireland	Spain	21–12
England	Namibia	21–14
Norfolk Island	Portugal	21–14
Canada	Netherlands	21–20
Round 6 – September 13		
Ireland	Netherlands	21–10
England	Portugal	21–2
Norfolk Island	Namibia	21–18
Canada	Spain	21–18
Round 7 – September 14		
Ireland	England	21–20
Namibia	Spain	21–4
Canada	Norfolk Island	21–17
Netherlands	Portugal	21–12

Women's singles section B
Round 1 – September 11		
Scotland	Botswana	21–9
Wales	Japan	21–3
Guernsey	Zambia	21–19
Round 2 – September 11		
Scotland	Fiji	21–15
Wales	Guernsey	21–13
Zambia	Japan	21–10
Round 3 – September 12		
Fiji	Wales	21–18
Scotland	Guernsey	21–11
Botswana	Japan	21–10
Round 4 – September 12		
Wales	Scotland	21–16
Fiji	Guernsey	21–10
Botswana	Zambia	21–16
Round 5 – September 13		
Wales	Botswana	21–6
Scotland	Zambia	21–7
Fiji	Japan	21–12
Round 6 – September 13		
Wales	Zambia	21–19
Japan	Guernsey	21–13
Botswana	Fiji	21–14
Round 7 – September 14		
Scotland	Japan	21–15
Botswana	Guernsey	21–8
Zambia	Fiji	21–8

Women's singles section C
Round 1 – September 11		
Australia	Isle of Man	21–4
Israel	Hong Kong	21–20
United States	New Zealand	21–20
Round 2 – September 11		
Australia	Israel	21–20
Malaysia	New Zealand	21–13
Hong Kong	Isle of Man	21–8
Round 3 – September 12		
Malaysia	Australia	21–7
New Zealand	Israel	21–14
United States	Isle of Man	21–15
Round 4 – September 12		
New Zealand	Australia	21–15
Israel	Malaysia	21–18
United States	Hong Kong	21–13
Round 5 – September 13		
Australia	United States	21–11
Hong Kong	New Zealand	21–9
Isle of Man	Malaysia	21–19
Round 6 – September 13		
Australia	Hong Kong	21–16
Israel	Isle of Man	21–1
United States	Malaysia	21–9
Round 7 – September 14		
Israel	United States	21–3
New Zealand	Isle of Man	21–6
Malaysia	Hong Kong	21–3

Women's singles section D
Round 1 – September 11		
Jersey	Philippines	21–12
South Africa	India	21–14
(Eswatini) Swaziland	Thailand	21–7
Round 2 – September 11		
South Africa	Jersey	21–2
Zimbabwe	(Eswatini) Swaziland	21–2
Philippines	India	21–11
Round 3 – September 12		
Zimbabwe	Jersey	21–14
South Africa	(Eswatini) Swaziland	21–11
Philippines	Thailand	21–12
Round 4 – September 12		
Jersey	(Eswatini) Swaziland	21–19
South Africa	Zimbabwe	21–8
Thailand	India	21–5
Round 5 – September 13		
Thailand	Jersey	21–14
(Eswatini) Swaziland	India	21–7
Philippines	Zimbabwe	21–18
Round 6 – September 13		
India	Jersey	21–7
Philippines	South Africa	21–10
Thailand	Zimbabwe	21–16
Round 7 – September 14		
South Africa	Thailand	21–11
(Eswatini) Swaziland	Philippines	21–11
Zimbabwe	India	21–14
