= Lorraine Malloy =

Scottish lawn bowler (born 1965)

Personal information
- Nationality: British (Scottish)
- Born: 8 September 1965 (age 60) Broxburn, West Lothian, Scotland

Sport
- Sport: Lawn bowls
- Club: Spring Grove BC / Balbardie IBC
Medal record
Representing Scotland
Atlantic Bowls Championships
Gold medal – first place	2015 Paphos	fours
Bronze medal – third place	2015 Paphos	triples
World Singles Champion of Champions
Silver medal – second place	2008 Aberdeen	women's title
British Isles Bowls Championships
Gold medal – first place	2010 Worthing	Women's Singles

Lorraine Malloy (born 1965) is a Scottish international lawn bowler.

== Bowls career ==
Malloy won two singles crowns at the Scottish National Bowls Championships in 2007 and 2009 while bowling for the Spring Grove Bowls Club. The latter success subsequently led her to winning the singles at the British Isles Bowls Championships in 2010.

In 2008 she finished runner-up to Kathy Pearce in the World Singles Champion of Champions held in Aberdeen. Malloy has also represented Scotland at two Commonwealth Games, when she participated in the triples event at the 2010 Commonwealth Games and both the pairs and fours at the 2014 Commonwealth Games.

In 2013, she won the Hong Kong International Bowls Classic singles title and in 2015, she won the fours gold medal with (Rebecca Craig, Stacey McDougall and Claire Johnston) at the Atlantic Bowls Championships.
