= Irit Grenchel =

Israeli international lawn bowler

Personal information
- Native name: אירית גרנצ'ל
- Nationality: Israeli
Medal record
Representing (Israel)
Atlantic Bowls Championships
| Silver medal – second place | 2005 Bangor | triples |
| Bronze medal – third place | 2007 Ayr | pairs |

Irit Grenchel (Hebrew: אירית גרנצ'ל) is an Israeli international lawn bowler.

== Bowls career ==
Grenchel was selected as part of the five woman team by Israel for the 2020 World Outdoor Bowls Championship Previously she had represented Israel at two more World Championships; the 2004 World Outdoor Bowls Championship and the 2008 World Outdoor Bowls Championship.

She won a triples silver medal (with Tami Kamzel and Naomi Fix), at the 2005 Atlantic Bowls Championships. Two years later she won a second medal at the Championships; this time it was a pairs bronze with Ruthie Gilor at the 2007 event in Ayr, Scotland.
