= Mitchinson =

Mitchinson may refer to:

- John Mitchinson (bishop), DD (1833–1918), English teacher, Anglican priest, Bishop of Barbados, Master of Pembroke College, Oxford
- John Mitchinson (researcher), the head of research for the British television panel game QI
- John Mitchinson (tenor) (born 1932), English operatic tenor
- Martin Mitchinson author of The Darien Gap, a non-fiction book, published 2008
- Sam Mitchinson (born 1992), left footed Australian football (soccer) player
- Scott Mitchinson (born 1984), Australian minor league baseball player
- Steven Mitchinson, (born 1975), lawn bowler from Harlow, Essex
- Wendy Mitchinson (1947–2021), Canadian historian at the University of Waterloo, Canada Research Chair in Gender and Medical history

== See also ==
- William Mitchinson Hicks, FRS (1850–1934), British mathematician and physicist
- Cyril Edwin Mitchinson Joad or C. E. M. Joad (1891–1953), English philosopher and broadcasting personality
