= 2008 World Outdoor Bowls Championship – Men's singles =

Bowls championship held in Christchurch, New Zealand

World Outdoor Bowls Championships 2008 – men's singles
- 11th World Outdoor Bowls Championships
- Location: Christchurch, New Zealand
- Date: 12–24 January 2008.
- Category: World Bowls Championship

The 2008 World Outdoor Bowls Championship men's singles was held at the Burnside Bowling Club in Christchurch, New Zealand, from 12 to 24 January 2008.

Safuan Said won the men's singles Gold.

Bizarrely, there is confusion as to the actual Brunei team that competed. Although HJ Brahim Naim is listed as competing in the singles and pairs he publicly announced that he was not there after missing his flight.

== Section tables ==
=== Section A ===
Pos	Player	P	W	L	F	A	Pts	Shots
1	(Malaysia) Safuan Said	10	9	1	198	147	18	+51
2	(Australia) Aron Sherriff	10	8	2	206	118	16	+88
3	(Canada) Ryan Bester	10	8	2	182	113	16	+69
4	(New Zealand) Ali Forsyth	10	7	3	192	128	14	+64
5	(Papua New Guinea) Peter Juni	10	6	4	185	171	12	+14
6	(Spain) Nick Cole	10	4	5	172	158	10	+14
7	(Wales) Mike Prosser	10	4	6	150	165	8	-15
8	(Zimbabwe) Roy Garden	10	4	6	156	195	8	-39
9	(Norfolk Island) Neil Tall	10	2	8	129	196	4	-67
10	(Brunei) Haji J Brahim Naim+	10	2	8	109	191	4	-82
11	(Israel) Danny Keet	10	0	10	113	210	0	-97

=== Section B ===
Pos	Player	P	W	L	F	A	Pts	Shots
1	(South Africa) Gerry Baker	11	10	1	228	142	20	+86
2	(Scotland) Darren Burnett	11	9	2	214	132	18	+82
3	(Guernsey) Gary Pitschou	11	8	3	201	151	16	+50
4	(Republic of Ireland) Martin McHugh	11	7	4	205	163	14	+42
5	(England) Mark Walton	11	7	4	202	169	14	+33
6	(Fiji) Ratish Lal	11	7	4	202	189	14	+13
7	(Jersey) Jamie Macdonald	11	5	6	203	181	10	+22
8	(Namibia) Douw Calitz	11	4	7	177	215	8	-38
9	(Hong Kong) Ken Chan	11	4	7	153	206	6	-53
10	(Cook Islands) Munokoa Totoo	11	3	8	168	211	6	-43
11	(Zimbabwe) Surasek Phonghanyudh	11	2	9	160	221	4	-61
12	(Argentina) Juan Garcia Cabello	11	0	11	98	231	0	-133

== Finals ==
Play Offs
(Malaysia) Said	21
(Republic of Ireland) McHugh	11
(Canada) Bester	21
(Scotland) Burnett	12
(Australia) Sherriff	21
(Guernsey) Pitschou	17
(New Zealand) Forsyth	21
(South Africa) Baker	18

Semifinals
(Malaysia) Said	21
(Canada) Bester	20
(Australia) Sherriff	21
(New Zealand) Forsyth	20

Gold medal
(Malaysia) Said	21
(Australia) Sherriff	10

== Results ==
Men's singles section 1
Round 1 – Jan 20		
Australia	Zimbabwe	21–11
New Zealand	Norfolk Island	21–7
Spain	Israel	21–0
Canada	Wales	21–3
Malaysia	Papua New Guinea	21–20
Round 2 – Jan 20		
Australia	Papua New Guinea	21–15
Canada	New Zealand	21–16
Zimbabwe	Spain	21–18
Malaysia	Israel	21–5
Brunei	Norfolk Island	21–7
Round 3 – Jan 20		
Australia	Israel	21–10
Wales	Norfolk Island	21–11
Canada	Brunei	21–6
Malaysia	Zimbabwe	21–12
Papua New Guinea	Spain	21–18
Round 4 – Jan 21		
Australia	Wales	21–11
Canada	Papua New Guinea	21–5
Spain	Brunei	21–3
Malaysia	New Zealand	21–17
Norfolk Island	Israel	21–19
Round 5 – Jan 21		
Australia	Norfolk Island	21–14
New Zealand	Wales	21–7
Zimbabwe	Israel	21–17
Malaysia	Spain	21–16
Papua New Guinea	Brunei	21–18
Round 6 – Jan 22		
New Zealand	Zimbabwe	21–7
Wales	Brunei	21–8
Canada	Norfolk Island	21–12
Spain	Australia	21–18
Papua New Guinea	Israel	21–18
Round 7 – Jan 22		
Australia	Brunei	21–1
New Zealand	Spain	21–8
Canada	Zimbabwe	21–15
Malaysia	Wales	21–17
Papua New Guinea	Norfolk Island	21–6
Round 8 – Jan 23		
New Zealand	Brunei	21–7
Wales	Israel	21–13
Spain	Canada	21–12
Malaysia	Australia	21–20
Papua New Guinea	Zimbabwe	21–18
Round 9 – Jan 23		
Australia	New Zealand	21–12
Wales	Spain	21–7
Canada	Israel	21–5
Malaysia	Brunei	21–9
Norfolk Island	Zimbabwe	21–9
Round 10 – Jan 24		
Australia	Canada	21–2
New Zealand	Papua New Guinea	21–19
Zimbabwe	Wales	21–19
Malaysia	Norfolk Island	21–10
Brunei	Israel	21–16
Round 11 – Jan 24		
New Zealand	Israel	21–10
Canada	Malaysia	21–9
Zimbabwe	Brunei	21–15
Spain	Norfolk Island	21–20
Papua New Guinea	Wales	21–9

Men's singles section 2
Round 1 – Jan 20		
England	Scotland	21–7
South Africa	Cook Islands	21–7
Ireland	Hong Kong	21–7
Guernsey	Jersey	21–12
Thailand	Argentina	21–17
Fiji	Namibia	21–13
Round 2 – Jan 20		
Scotland	South Africa	21–18
Jersey	Argentina	21–9
Namibia	Thailand	21–19
Ireland	Cook Islands	21–11
Guernsey	Fiji	21–15
Hong Kong	England	21–18
Round 3 – Jan 20		
Scotland	Ireland	21–9
England	Cook Islands	21–18
South Africa	Hong Kong	21–13
Jersey	Namibia	21–12
Guernsey	Thailand	21–16
Fiji	Argentina	21–5
Round 4 – Jan 21		
Scotland	Argentina	21–17
England	Jersey	21–15
South Africa	Thailand	21–12
Namibia	Cook Islands	21–15
Guernsey	Hong Kong	21–9
Fiji	Ireland	21–15
Round 5 – Jan 21		
Scotland	Hong Kong	21–1
South Africa	England	21–9
Jersey	Cook Islands	21–14
Ireland	Argentina	21–6
Guernsey	Namibia	21–15
Fiji	Thailand	21–19
Round 6 – Jan 22		
South Africa	Guernsey	21–4
Namibia	Argentina	21–14
Ireland	England	21–8
Thailand	Hong Kong	21–15
Fiji	Jersey	21–20
Cook Islands	Scotland	21–18
Round 7 – Jan 22		
Scotland	Guernsey	21–14
England	Thailand	21–10
South Africa	Fiji	21–14
Ireland	Jersey	21–19
Cook Islands	Argentina	21–6
Hong Kong	Namibia	21–16
Round 8 – Jan 23		
Scotland	Fiji	21–7
South Africa	Ireland	21–20
Jersey	Thailand	21–10
Namibia	England	21–20
Guernsey	Argentina	21–10
Hong Kong	Cook Islands	21–14
Round 9 – Jan 23		
Scotland	Namibia	21–10
England	Fiji	21–19
South Africa	Jersey	21–17
Ireland	Thailand	21–14
Guernsey	Cook Islands	21–7
Hong Kong	Argentina	21–11
Round 10 – Jan 24		
Scotland	Thailand	21–9
England	Argentina	21–1
South Africa	Namibia	21–13
Jersey	Hong Kong	21–10
Guernsey	Ireland	21–14
Fiji	Cook Islands	21–19
Round 11 – Jan 24		
Scotland	Jersey	21–15
England	Guernsey	21–15
South Africa	Argentina	21–12
Ireland	Namibia	21–14
Fiji	Hong Kong	21–14
Cook Islands	Thailand	21–19
