= Liz Cole =

Liz Cole is the name of:

- Liz Cole (television producer)
- Liz Cole (lawn bowler)
