= Margaret Letham =

British lawn bowler

Personal information
- Nationality: British (Scottish)
- Born: 21 June 1956 (age 70)

Sport
- Sport: Bowls
- Club: Burbank Hamilton BC (outdoors); Blantyre Miners Welfare (indoors)
Medal record
Representing Scotland
Women's bowls
World Outdoor Championships
Gold medal – first place	2000 Moama	Pairs
Gold medal – first place	2012 Adelaide	Fours
Bronze medal – third place	1996 Leamington Spa	Team
Bronze medal – third place	2000 Moama	Team
Bronze medal – third place	2004 Leamington Spa	Singles
Bronze medal – third place	2012 Adelaide	Pairs
Bronze medal – third place	2012 Adelaide	Team
Commonwealth Games
Gold medal – first place	1998 Kuala Lumpur	Pairs
Atlantic Championships
Gold medal – first place	1999 Cape Town	Pairs
Gold medal – first place	2007 Ayr	Pairs
Gold medal – first place	2009 Johannesburg	Pairs
Gold medal – first place	2011 Paphos	Pairs
Silver medal – second place	1999 Cape Town	Singles
Silver medal – second place	2005 Bangor	Pairs
Silver medal – second place	2005 Bangor	Fours
British Isles Championships
Gold medal – first place	2022 Landrindod Wells	singles

Margaret Elizabeth Letham (born 21 June 1956) is a female lawn and indoor bowler. From Hamilton, South Lanarkshire, in Scotland and started bowling at the age of 15.

== Bowls career ==
=== World Outdoor Championships ===
Letham has won medals at four World Outdoor Championships. Starting with a pairs gold with Joyce Lindores in 2000 in Moama, Australia, and then a singles bronze four years later in Leamington Spa. The third medal came eight years later when she was part of the four that won gold in Adelaide, the four consisted of Letham, Caroline Brown, Lynn Stein and Michelle Cooper. At the same event she also won the pairs bronze partnering Claire Johnston.

=== Commonwealth Games ===
She won gold medal at the 1998 Commonwealth Games in Kuala Lumpur, Malaysia and had competed in five consecutive Commonwealth Games for Scotland from 1998 until 2014.

=== International ===
In 1999 she won the singles silver medal and pairs gold medal at the Atlantic Bowls Championships.

Six years later in 2005, she won the pairs and fours silver medals at the Championships and in 2007 she a second pairs gold medal at the Championships. In 2009 she won her third pairs gold medal before winning a fourth pairs gold medal (and seventh medal in total) at the 2011 Championships in Paphos.

In 2008, she won the Hong Kong International Bowls Classic singles title.

=== National ===
Letham has won the Scottish National Bowls Championships singles title on two occasions in 1999 and 2019. In 2022, she won the women's singles at the British Isles Bowls Championships.
