= Dinesh Kumar =

Dinesh Kumar may refer to:

- Dinesh Kumar (bowls) (born 1977), Indian international lawn bowler
- Dinesh Kumar (boxer) (born 1988), Indian boxer
- Dinesh Kumar (footballer) (born 1997), Indian footballer represents Coimbatore and played for chennai city fc
- Dinesh (choreographer) (born 1975), Indian choreographer
- Dinesh Kumar (cyclist), Indian cyclist at events such as 2022 Commonwealth Games
