= 2016 World Outdoor Bowls Championship – Women's singles =

World Outdoor Championships 2016 women's singles
- 13th World Outdoor Bowls Championships
- Location: Christchurch, New Zealand
- Date: 29 November – 11 December 2016
- Category: 2016 World Outdoor Bowls Championship

The 2016 World Outdoor Bowls Championship women's singles was held at the Burnside Bowling Club in Avonhead, Christchurch, New Zealand, from 29 November to 4 December 2016.

The women's singles gold medal went to Karen Murphy of Australia. It was her second consecutive singles title after having won in 2012 as well.

== Section tables ==
=== Section 1 ===
Team	Player	P	W	D	L	Pts	Shots
1	(Canada) Kelly McKerihen	9	8	0	1	16	+63
2	(Australia) Karen Murphy	9	7	0	2	14	+68
2	(New Zealand) Jo Edwards	9	7	0	2	14	+68
4	(Netherlands) Saskia Schaft	9	6	0	3	12	+30
4	(Wales) Laura Daniels	9	6	0	3	12	+30
6	(United States) Kim Heiser	9	3	0	6	6	−17
7	(Kenya) Susan Kariuki	9	3	0	6	6	−48
8	(Fiji) Sainiana Walker	9	3	0	6	6	−55
9	(Cyprus) Fran Davis	9	2	0	7	4	−47
10	(Guernsey) Jacqueline Nicolle	9	0	0	9	0	−92

=== Section 2 ===
Team	Player	P	W	D	L	Pts	shots
1	(Scotland) Lesley Doig	9	8	0	1	16	+64
2	(Malaysia) Siti Zalina Ahmad	9	6	0	3	12	+50
3	(Norfolk Island) Carmen Anderson	9	6	0	3	12	+23
4	(Philippines) Ainie Knight	9	6	0	3	12	+18
5	Catherine Beattie	9	5	0	4	10	+16
6	(South Africa) Colleen Piketh	9	5	0	4	10	+6
7	(Brunei) Nurul Chuchu	9	5	0	4	10	−6
8	(England) Sophie Tolchard	9	2	0	7	4	−12
9	(Zimbabwe) Debbie Robertson	9	2	0	7	4	−84
10	(Cook Islands) Teokotai Jim	9	0	0	9	0	−75

== Finals ==
Play Offs
(Canada) McKerihen	bye
(Malaysia) Zalina Ahmad	14
(Australia) Murphy	21
(Scotland) Doig	bye
(New Zealand) Edwards	21
(Norfolk Island) Anderson	20

Semifinals
(Canada) McKerihen	20
(Australia) Murphy	21
(Scotland) Doig	21
(New Zealand) Edwards	18

Gold medal
(Australia) Murphy	21
(Scotland) Doig	13

== Results ==
Women's singles section 1
Round 1 – 29 Nov		
Netherlands	Fiji	21–9
United States	Guernsey	21–5
Australia	Cyprus	21–7
New Zealand	Kenya	21–8
Canada	Wales	21–16
Round 2 – 29 Nov		
Fiji	Kenya	21–12
Wales	Netherlands	21–17
Cyprus	Guernsey	21–20
Australia	United States	21–14
Canada	New Zealand	21–16
Round 3 – 29 Nov		
New Zealand	Wales	21–12
Fiji	Cyprus	21–18
Netherlands	United States	21–9
Canada	Guernsey	21–15
Kenya	Australia	21–16
Round 4 – 30 Nov		
Canada	Cyprus	21–13
Australia	Fiji	21–3
Netherlands	Kenya	21–10
New Zealand	United States	21–10
Wales	Guernsey	21–6
Round 5 – 30 Nov		
Netherlands	Guernsey	21–12
Australia	Canada	21–19
Kenya	United States	21–14
New Zealand	Cyprus	21–12
Wales	Fiji	21–12
Round 6 – 30 Nov		
Cyprus	Kenya	21–12
New Zealand	Guernsey	21–1
Australia	Wales	21–9
United States	Fiji	21–15
Canada	Netherlands	21–11
Round 7 – 1 Dec		
Australia	Guernsey	21–9
Canada	Fiji	21–5
Netherlands	New Zealand	21–16
Wales	Kenya	21–8
United States	Cyprus	21–14
Round 8 – 1 Dec		
Canada	Kenya	21–12
New Zealand	Australia	21–20
Netherlands	Cyprus	21–17
Wales	United States	21–18
Fiji	Guernsey	21–12
Round 9 – 1 Dec		
Canada	United States	21–15
Australia	Netherlands	21–12
New Zealand	Fiji	21–6
Wales	Cyprus	21–9
Kenya	Guernsey	21–17

Women's singles section 2
Round 1 – 29 Nov		
Norfolk Island	Zimbabwe	21–5
Scotland	Malaysia	21–16
Ireland	Cook Islands	21–13
England	Philippines	21–20
Brunei	South Africa	21–13
Round 2 – 29 Nov		
Philippines	Zimbabwe	21–10
Norfolk Island	Brunei	21–17
Malaysia	Cook Islands	21–17
Scotland	Ireland	21–18
South Africa	England	21–16
Round 3 – 29 Nov		
Brunei	England	21–16
Zimbabwe	Cook Islands	21–18
Scotland	Norfolk Island	21–11
South Africa	Malaysia	21–17
Philippines	Ireland	21–15
Round 4 – 30 Nov		
Philippines	Norfolk Island	21–19
Scotland	England	21–19
South Africa	Cook Islands	21–9
Ireland	Zimbabwe	21–8
Malaysia	Brunei	21–5
Round 5 – 30 Nov		
England	Cook Islands	21–11
Brunei	Zimbabwe	21–12
Norfolk Island	Malaysia	21–18
Ireland	South Africa	21–14
Philippines	Scotland	21–17
Round 6 – 30 Nov		
Philippines	Cook Islands	21–11
Ireland	Brunei	21–19
Malaysia	England	21–20
Scotland	Zimbabwe	21–5
Norfolk Island	South Africa	21–16
Round 7 – 1 Dec		
Scotland	Cook Islands	21–6
Brunei	Philippines	21–20
Malaysia	Ireland	21–9
South Africa	Zimbabwe	21–11
England	Norfolk Island	21–12
Round 8 – 1 Dec		
Scotland	Brunei	21–10
Malaysia	Zimbabwe	21–6
Norfolk Island	Cook Islands	21–12
Ireland	England	21–7
South Africa	Philippines	21–20
Round 9 – 1 Dec		
Scotland	South Africa	21–15
Malaysia	Philippines	21–7
Norfolk Island	Ireland	21–14
Brunei	Cook Islands	21–17
Zimbabwe	England	21–18
