= Ysie White =

Welsh lawn bowler

Personal information
- Nationality: British (Welsh)
- Born: 17 August 1993 (age 32)
- Home town: Whitland, Carmarthenshire, Wales

Sport
- Sport: Lawn bowls
- Club: Tenby BC (outdoors)
Medal record
Representing Wales
Atlantic Bowls Championships
Gold medal – first place	2019 Cardiff	fours
Bronze medal – third place	2019 Cardiff	pairs

Ysie White (born 17 August 1993) is a Welsh international lawn bowler.

== Bowls career ==
In 2019, she won the fours gold medal and the pairs bronze medal at the Atlantic Bowls Championships

In 2020, she was selected for the sport's blue riband event, the 2020 World Outdoor Bowls Championship in Australia but the event was cancelled due to the COVID-19 pandemic.

In 2022, she competed in the women's triples and the Women's fours at the 2022 Commonwealth Games.

In 2023, she was selected as part of the team to represent Wales at the 2023 World Outdoor Bowls Championship. She participated in the women's pairs and the women's fours events. In the fours, her team reached the quarter final before being beaten by England.
