= Lauren Baillie-Whyte =

Scottish international lawn bowler (born 1982)

Personal information
- Nationality: British (Scottish)
- Born: 7 February 1982 (age 44)

Sport
- Sport: Lawn bowls
- Club: Cockenzie & Port Seton BC
Medal record
World Outdoor Championships
Bronze medal – third place	2016 Christchurch	pairs

Lauren Suzanne Baillie-Whyte (born 7 February 1982), formerly Lauren Baillie, is a Scottish international lawn bowler.

== Biography ==
Baillie won a bronze medal in the pairs at the 2016 World Outdoor Bowls Championship in Christchurch with bowls partner Lesley Doig.

She also won the Scottish National Bowls Championships pairs title on four occasions with her sister Leanne Baillie in 2009, 2011, 2012 & 2013 bowling for Cockenzie & Port Seton. In 2019, she changed her name to Baillie-Whyte.

In 2020, she was selected for the 2020 World Outdoor Bowls Championship in Australia.

In 2022, she competed in the women's triples and the Women's fours at the 2022 Commonwealth Games.
