= Eleanor Allan =

Scottish lawn bowler

Personal information
- Nationality: Scottish
- Born: 25 December 1937 (age 88)
Medal record
Representing Scotland
Atlantic Bowls Championships
Gold medal – first place	1995 Durban	fours

Eleanor Stuart Allan is a former Scottish international female lawn bowler.

== Bowls career ==
In 1995, she won the fours gold medal at the Atlantic Bowls Championships with Betty Forsyth, Frances Whyte and Liz Dickson.

== Personal life ==
She was a Director of World Bowls from 2001 to 2012 and is a life member. She is also the Secretary for Bowls Scotland.
