= Mary Davies (bowls) =

Welsh lawn bowler

Personal information
- Nationality: British (Welsh)

Sport
- Sport: British (Welsh)
- Club: Llandrindod Wells BC
Medal record
Representing Wales
Atlantic Bowls Championships
Gold medal – first place	1993 Florida	triples
Silver medal – second place	1993 Florida	fours
British Isles Championships
Gold medal – first place	1991	triples
Gold medal – first place	1999	fours

Mary Davies is a former Welsh international lawn bowler.

== Biography ==
In 1993 she won the triples gold medal and the fours silver medal at the inaugural Atlantic Bowls Championships.

Davies represented the Welsh team at the 1994 Commonwealth Games in Victoria, Canada, where she competed in the fours event, with Val Howell, Linda Evans and Betty Morgan.

Davies just missed out on medal during the 1992 World Outdoor Bowls Championship after losing the triples bronze play off.

She is a multiple Welsh champion winning the Welsh National Bowls Championships seven times (triples 1990, 1991, 2001, fours 1993, 1998 1999 and pairs 1997) and has won two British Isles Bowls Championships titles.
