= Wendy Vickery =

South African-born Swazi lawn bowler

Personal information
- Nationality: Swazi / South African
- Born: 21 July 1946 (age 79)
Medal record
Representing (Eswatini)
Atlantic Bowls Championships
Silver medal – second place	1999 Cape Town	triples

Wendy Marion Vickery (born 1946) is a South African born, former Swaziland international lawn bowler.

== Bowls career ==
Vickery has represented Swaziland at three Commonwealth Games at the 1986 Commonwealth Games, the 1990 Commonwealth Games and the 1994 Commonwealth Games.

She won a triples silver medal at the 1999 Atlantic Bowls Championships in Cape Town, South Africa.
