= Sarah Mansbridge =

Personal information
- Nationality: British (Welsh)
- Born: 28 November 1975 (age 50)

Sport
- Club: Saundersfoot BC
Medal record
Representing Wales
Atlantic Bowls Championships
Gold medal – first place	1997 Llandrindod Wells	triples
Silver medal – second place	1997 Llandrindod Wells	fours

Sarah Mansbridge is a former Welsh international lawn bowler.

== Bowls career ==
Mansbridge won the triples gold medal with Betty Morgan and Kathy Pearce and the fours silver medal at the 1997 Atlantic Bowls Championships In Llandrindod wells.

She was selected by Wales for the 1998 Commonwealth Games where she competed in the fours event. The team finished in 4th place in section B and therefore missing out on a medal.
