= Chandan Kumar Singh =

Indian bowls player

Chandan Singh
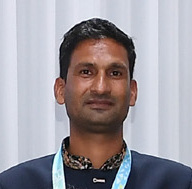
- Singh in August 2022

Personal information
- Nationality: Indian
- Born: 5 June 1985 (age 41) Ranchi, Jharkhand, India

Achievements and titles
- Highest world ranking: 53 (August 2024)
Medal record
Representing India
Commonwealth Games
| Silver medal – second place | 2022 Birmingham | fours |
Asian Lawn Bowls Championship
| Gold medal – first place | 2016 Brunei | fours |
| Gold medal – first place | 2017 New Delhi | triples |
| Gold medal – first place | 2024 Pattaya | fours |

Chandan Kumar Singh (born 5 June 1985) is an Indian international lawn bowler. He is a two times Asian Champion and has represented India at three Commonwealth Games.

== Career ==
In 2014 and 2018, he competed in the 2014 Commonwealth Games and the 2018 Commonwealth Games.

Singh won the gold medal at the Asian Lawn Bowls Championship in 2016 in the fours and the following year in 2017, in the triples.

In 2022, he was selected for the 2022 Commonwealth Games in Birmingham, where he competed in two events; the men's triples and the men's fours. In the fours event as part of the team with Sunil Bahadur, Navneet Singh and Dinesh Kumar he reached the final and secured a silver medal.

In 2023, he was selected by the Indian national team, to represent them at the sport's blue riband event, the 2023 World Bowls Championship. He participated in the men's triples and the men's fours events.

Singh won the gold medal in the fours at the 15th Asian Lawn Bowls Championship, held in Pattaya, Thailand, during March 2024.
