= Helen Grundlingh =

African famous lawn bowler

Personal information
- Nationality: South African

Sport
- Sport: Lawn bowls
- Club: Port Natal BC
Medal record
Representing South Africa
Atlantic Bowls Championships
Silver medal – second place	2011 Paphos	fours
Bronze medal – third place	2011 Paphos	triples

Helen Jeanne Grundlingh is a South African lawn bowler. She competed in the women's singles at the 2010 Commonwealth Games.

In 2011 she won the fours silver medal and triples bronze medal at the Atlantic Bowls Championships.
