= Gedion Appollis =

Namibian lawn bowler

Personal information
- Nationality: Namibian
- Born: 3 July 1975 (age 50) Walvis Bay, Namibia

Sport
- Sport: Lawn bowls
Medal record
Representing Namibia
Atlantic Bowls Championships
Bronze medal – third place	2019 Cardiff	triples

Gedion Appollis also known as Piet Appollis (born 1975) is an international lawn bowler from Namibia.

== Bowls career ==
Appollis represented Namibia at the 2014 Commonwealth Games

In 2019 he won the triples bronze medal at the Atlantic Bowls Championships.
