= Kay Moran =

Scottish bowler

Personal information
- Nationality: Scottish
- Born: 5 October 1973 (age 53) Glasgow

Sport
- Club: Crookston BC / Cabramatta BC
Medal record
Representing Scotland
Lawn bowls
Commonwealth Games
Silver medal – second place	2006 Melbourne	pairs
Silver medal – second place	2018 Gold Coast	triples
Atlantic Bowls Championships
Gold medal – first place	2005 Bangor	singles
Gold medal – first place	2007 Ayr	pairs

Kay Moran (born 5 October 1973) is a female Scottish international lawn and indoor bowler.

== Bowls career ==
She won a silver medal in the pairs with Joyce Lindores at the 2006 Commonwealth Games in Melbourne.

In 2005 she won the singles gold medal at the Atlantic Bowls Championships and in 2007 she won the pairs gold medal at the Atlantic Championships.

In 2018 she was selected as part of the Scottish team for the 2018 Commonwealth Games on the Gold Coast in Queensland that won a silver medal in the Triples with Caroline Brown and Stacey McDougall.

Originally from Crookston, Glasgow she now lives in Shell Cove, New South Wales, Australia and plays for the Cabramatta Bowls Club and has won several prestigious Australian titles including the Australian Open and the Australian National Bowls Championships fours.

In 2020 she was selected for the 2020 World Outdoor Bowls Championship in Australia.
