= Adam McKeown (bowls) =

Northern Irish lawn and indoor bowler

Personal information
- Nationality: Northern Irish
- Born: 1 February 2000 (age 26)

Sport
- Sport: Lawn and indoor bowls
- Club: Old Bleach BC

Achievements and titles
- Highest world ranking: 20 (June 2024)
Medal record
Representing Northern Ireland
Commonwealth Games
| Gold medal – first place | 2022 Birmingham | fours |
| Gold medal – first place | 2026 Glasgow | pairs |
Representing combined Ireland
World Outdoor Championships
| Gold medal – first place | 2023 Gold Coast | pairs |
| Bronze medal – third place | 2023 Gold Coast | fours |
| Silver medal – second place | 2023 Gold Coast | team |
Bowls World Cup
| Bronze medal – third place | 2025 Kuala Lumpur | pairs |
Atlantic Bowls Championships
| Bronze medal – third place | 2019 Cardiff | singles |
Irish Nationals
| Gold medal – first place | 2022 | singles |

Adam McKeown (born 1 February 2000) is a Northern Irish international lawn and indoor bowler. He reached a career high ranking of world number 20 in June 2024.

== Bowls career ==
McKeown started playing outdoor bowls at 10 years old at Mossley Outdoor Bowling Club. He won the British Isles U-18 title in 2017 becoming his Club's first ever British champion. Two years later he won the singles bronze medal at the 2019 Atlantic Bowls Championships. Indoors he has won the mixed doubles title at the 2019/20 IIBC Championships.

In 2022, he competed in the men's triples and the men's fours at the 2022 Commonwealth Games. In the fours the team of McKeown, Sam Barkley, Ian McClure and Martin McHugh won the gold medal defeating India in the final. Just one month later he won his first national title when winning the open singles at the Irish National Bowls Championships.

In 2023, he was selected as part of the team to represent Ireland at the sport's blue riband event, the 2023 World Outdoor Bowls Championship. He participated in the men's pairs and the men's fours events. In the pairs with Gary Kelly, they topped their group before going on to win the gold medal, defeating Australia in the final. He then won a bronze medal in the fours (partnering Stuart Bennett, Ian McClure and Martin McHugh) to complete a very successful Championship. He also represented Ireland at the Hong Kong International Bowls Classic.

At the 2026 Commonwealth Games, he combined with Gary Kelly to win the gold medal in the men's pairs, defeating England's Nick Brett and Jamie Walker on a tiebreak end in the final.
