= Loukas Paraskeva =

Cypriot lawn bowler

Personal information
- Nationality: Cypriot
Medal record
Representing (Cyprus)
Atlantic Bowls Championships
Bronze medal – third place	2011 Cyprus	triples

Loukas Paraskeva is a Cypriot international lawn bowler.

== Bowls career ==
Paraskeva was selected as part of the two man team by Cyprus for the 2016 World Outdoor Bowls Championship, which was held in Avonhead, Christchurch, New Zealand.

He won a triples bronze medal at the 2011 Atlantic Bowls Championships and has won eight titles at the Cypriot National Championships.
