= Navneet Singh (bowls) =

Indian bowls player

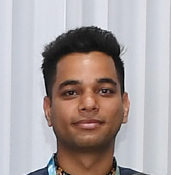
- Singh in August 2022

Personal information
- Nationality: Indian
- Born: 13 September 1994 (age 31)

Achievements and titles
- Highest world ranking: 32 (August 2026)
Medal record
Men's lawn bowls
Representing India
Commonwealth Games
Silver medal – second place	2022 Birmingham	fours

Navneet Singh (born 13 September 1994) is an Indian international lawn bowler. He has represented India at the Commonwealth Games and won a medal. He reached a career high ranking of world number 32 in August 2026.

== Career ==
In 2022, he was selected for the 2022 Commonwealth Games in Birmingham, where he competed in two events; the men's triples and the men's fours. In the fours event as part of the team with Sunil Bahadur, Chandan Kumar Singh and Dinesh Kumar he reached the final and secured a silver medal.

In 2023, he was selected by the Indian national team, to represent them at the sport's blue riband event, the 2023 World Bowls Championship. He participated in the men's triples and the men's fours events.
