= Alister Kennedy =

Scottish lawn bowler

Personal information
- Nationality: British (Scottish)
- Born: 1978 (age 47–48)

Sport
- Club: West Barns BC
Medal record
Representing Scotland
Atlantic Bowls Championships
Gold medal – first place	2011 Paphos	fours
Silver medal – second place	2011 Paphos	triples
British Isles Championships
Gold medal – first place	2014	pairs

Alister Kennedy (born 1978) is a Scottish international lawn bowler.

== Bowls career ==
Kennedy won the fours gold medal and triples silver medal at the 2011 Atlantic Bowls Championships.

Kennedy became a Scottish national champion in 2013 after winning the pairs title with Billy Mellors at the Scottish National Bowls Championships. The pair subsequently became British champions the following year after winning the British Isles Bowls Championships.
