= Mandy O'Donnell =

Scottish lawn and indoor bowler (born 1989)

Personal information
- Nationality: Scottish
- Born: 1989

Sport
- Sport: Bowls
- Club: Bainfield BC
Medal record
Representing Scotland
Atlantic Bowls Championships
| Gold medal – first place | 2011 Paphos | triples |

Mandy O'Donnell (born 1989) is a female Scottish international lawn and indoor bowler.

== Bowls career ==
In 2011 she won the triples gold medal at the Atlantic Bowls Championships with Lorna Smith and Anne Dunwoodie.

She won the British U-25 title in 2011.
