= Lawn bowls at the 2022 Commonwealth Games – Men's fours =

Bowls event

Lawn bowls men's four at the 2022 Commonwealth Games
- Venue: Victoria Park
- Dates: 2 August – 6 August 2022
- Competitors: 68 from 17 nations

Medalists
gold medal	Sam Barkley; Adam McKeown; Ian McClure; Martin McHugh	Northern Ireland
silver medal	Sunil Bahadur; Navneet Singh; Chandan Kumar Singh; Dinesh Kumar	India
bronze medal	Louis Ridout; Nick Brett; Jamie Chestney; Sam Tolchard	England

Lawn bowls at the 2022 Commonwealth Games – Men's fours was held at the Victoria Park from August 2 to August 6. A total of 68 athletes from 17 associations participated in the event. Northern Ireland won the gold medal, defeating India in the final. England won the bronze medal.

== Results ==
The top two from each section advance to the knockout stage.

=== Section A ===
Rank	Nation	Athletes	MP	MW	MT	ML	FR	AG	PD	PTS
1	Scotland	Stewart Anderson, Darren Burnett, Paul Foster, Alex Marshall	4	3	0	1	58	42	+16	9
2	New Zealand	Tony Grantham, Andrew Kelly, Mike Galloway, Ali Forsyth	4	2	0	2	59	54	+5	6
3	South Africa	Bradley Robinson, Prince Neluonde, Petrus Breitenbach, Wayne Rittmuller	4	2	0	2	56	57	-1	6
4	Jersey	Derek Boswell, Scott Ruderham, Greg Davis, Malcolm De Sousa	4	2	0	2	51	58	-7	6
5	Malta	Peter John Ellul, Mark Malogorski, Troy Lorimer, Shaun Parnis	4	1	0	3	52	65	-13	3

	Jersey	Malta	New Zealand	Scotland	South Africa
Jersey	—	19–11	9–22	13–8	10–17
Malta	11–19	—	13–14	9–17	19–15
New Zealand	22–9	14–13	—	10–18	13–14
Scotland	8–13	17–9	18–10	—	15–10
South Africa	17–10	15–19	14–13	10–15	—

=== Section B ===
Rank	Nation	Athletes	MP	MW	MT	ML	FR	AG	PD	PTS
1	Canada	Rob Law, Greg Wilson, John Bezear, Cam Lefresne	3	3	0	0	50	22	+28	9
2	Northern Ireland	Sam Barkley, Adam McKeown, Ian McClure, Martin McHugh	3	2	0	1	45	28	+17	6
3	Australia	Barrie Lester, Carl Healey, Corey Wedlock, Ben Twist	3	1	0	2	32	39	-7	3
4	Niue	Norman Mitimeti, Leslie Lagatule, Kolonisi Polima, Dalton Tagelagi	3	0	0	3	19	57	-38	0

	Australia	Canada	Niue	Northern Ireland
Australia	—	6–19	18–8	8–12
Canada	19–6	—	18–4	13–12
Niue	8–18	4–18	—	7–21
Northern Ireland	12–8	12–13	21–7	—

=== Section C ===
Rank	Nation	Athletes	MP	MW	MT	ML	FR	AG	PD	PTS
1	England	Louis Ridout, Nick Brett, Jamie Chestney, Sam Tolchard	3	3	0	0	68	29	+39	9
2	India	Sunil Bahadur, Navneet Singh, Chandan Kumar Singh, Dinesh Kumar	3	2	0	1	45	41	+4	6
3	Cook Islands	Royden Aperau, Alex Kairua, Aidan Zittersteijn, Jason Lindsey	3	1	0	2	35	55	-20	3
4	Fiji	Martin Fong, Kushal Pillay, Rajnesh Prasad, David Aitcheson	3	0	0	3	29	52	-23	0

	Cook Islands	England	Fiji	India
Cook Islands	—	10–25	15–10	10–20
England	25–10	—	23–8	20–11
Fiji	10–15	8–23	—	11–14
India	20–10	11–20	14–11	—

=== Section D ===
Rank	Nation	Athletes	MP	MW	MT	ML	FR	AG	PD	PTS
1	Wales	Owain Dando, Jarrad Breen, Ross Owen, Jonathan Tomlinson	3	2	1	0	59	22	+37	7
2	Malaysia	Idham Amin Ramlan, Izzat Dzulkeple, Syamil Syazwan Ramli, Soufi Rusli	3	2	1	0	52	31	+21	7
3	Norfolk Island	John Christian, Trevor Gow, Hadyn Evans, Tim Sheridan	3	1	0	2	36	42	-6	3
4	Brunei	Haji Amli Haji Gafar, Bahren Abdul Rahman, Haji Osman Haji Yahya, Mohd Hazmi Hj Idris	3	0	0	3	14	66	-52	0

	Brunei	Malaysia	Norfolk Island	Wales
Brunei	—	8–21	4–17	2–28
Malaysia	21–8	—	19–11	12–12
Norfolk Island	17–4	11–19	—	8–19
Wales	28–2	12–12	19–8	—

== Knockout stage ==
Quarterfinals
A1	Scotland	15
B2	Northern Ireland	18
D1	Wales	18
A2	New Zealand	16
B1	Canada	10
C2	India	14
C1	England	16
D2	Malaysia	10

Semifinals
B2	Northern Ireland	18
D1	Wales	9
C2	India	13
C1	England	12

Final
B2	Northern Ireland	18
C2	India	5
Third place
D1	Wales	12
C1	England	17
