= Lesley Doig =

Scottish bowls player

Personal information
- Nationality: British (Scottish)
- Born: 13 August 1991 (age 34) Perth, Scotland

Sport
- Sport: Lawn & indoor bowls
- Club: Strathmiglo BC
Medal record
World Outdoor Championships
Silver medal – second place	2016 Christchurch	singles
Bronze medal – third place	2016 Christchurch	pairs
World Indoor Bowls Championships
Gold medal – first place	2018 Yarmouth	Mixed pairs
Bronze medal – third place	2018 Gold Coast	Pairs

Lesley Jayne Doig (born 13 August 1991) is a Scottish international lawn and indoor bowler.

Doig won a bronze medal in the 2015 World Junior Championship before achieving a notable success by winning the silver medal in the singles at the 2016 World Outdoor Bowls Championship in Christchurch losing out to Karen Murphy in the final. She then won the bronze medal in the pairs with Lauren Baillie.

In 2018, Doig won the World Indoor Mixed Pairs title with Jamie Chestney.

She was selected as part of the Scottish team for the 2018 Commonwealth Games on the Gold Coast in Queensland where she won a bronze medal in the Pairs with Claire Johnston.
