= Jacqui Janse van Rensburg =

Lawn Bowler

Personal information
- Nickname: Jax
- Nationality: South African

Sport
- Sport: Lawn bowls
- Club: Morningside Country Club / Johannesburg
Medal record
Representing South Africa
Atlantic Bowls Championships
Silver medal – second place	2019 Cardiff	fours
Bronze medal – third place	2019 Cardiff	triples

Jacquelyn Janse van Rensburg is a South African international lawn bowler.

== Bowls career ==
In 2019, she won the fours silver medal and triples bronze medal at the Atlantic Bowls Championships.

In 2023, she was part of the four who won the fours title at the South African National Bowls Championships.

In 2023, Van Rensburg represented South Africa at the Multi Nation event held in Australia; triples team winning silver.

Later in the year, Van Rensburg and Dezi Rosenblatt won bronze at the Hong Kong Classic.

Van Rensburg represented South Africa at the 2026 Commonwealth Games.
