= Val Howell =

Welsh bowls player (died 2021)

Personal information
- Nationality: British (Welsh)
- Died: 25 January 2021

Sport
- Sport: Lawn and indoor bowls
- Club: Merthyr West End BC
Medal record
Representing Wales
Atlantic Bowls Championships
| Gold medal – first place | 1993 Florida | triples |
| Silver medal – second place | 1993 Florida | fours |

Val Howell (died 25 January 2021) was a Welsh international lawn bowler.

== Biography ==
In 1993, she won the triples gold medal and the fours silver medal at the inaugural Atlantic Bowls Championships.

Howell represented the Welsh team at the 1994 Commonwealth Games in Victoria, Canada, where she competed in the fours event, with Mary Davies, Linda Evans and Betty Morgan.

She became a Welsh champion in 1986 winning the triples at the Welsh National Bowls Championships.

She later became the Welsh team manager.
