= Gus Hodgetts =

British lawn bowler

Personal information
- Nationality: Australian/British (Jersey)
- Born: Australia

Sport
- Sport: Lawn bowls
- Club: Jersey BC
Medal record
Representing Jersey
Atlantic Bowls Championships
Gold medal – first place	2015 Paphos	fours

Ian Gus Hodgetts is an Australian born, international lawn bowler from Jersey.

== Bowls career ==
In 2015, he won the fours gold medal at the Atlantic Bowls Championships.
