= Anne Dunwoodie =

Scottish lawn bowler and journalist

Personal information
- Nationality: Scottish
- Born: October 1949 (age 76)

Sport
- Sport: Bowls
Medal record
Representing Scotland
Atlantic Bowls Championships
Gold medal – first place	2011 Paphos	triples

Anne Dunwoodie (born October 1949) is a female Scottish international lawn bowler and journalist.

== Bowls career ==
In 2011 she won the triples gold medal at the Atlantic Bowls Championships with Lorna Smith and Mandy O'Donnell.

She writes for Bowls International and in 2010 was made an honorary life member of the Scottish Indoor Bowls Association.
