= Prince Neluonde =

Mmboniseni Prince Neluonde
Personal information
- Nationality: South African
- Born: 1 May 1984 (age 42) Thohoyandou, South Africa

Sport
- Sport: Lawn bowls
- Club: Bryanston Sports
Medal record
Representing South Africa
Men's lawn bowls
Commonwealth Games
Gold medal – first place	2014 Glasgow	Men's triples
Atlantic Bowls Championships
Gold medal – first place	2019 Cardiff	triples

Mmboniseni 'Prince' Neluonde (born 1 May 1984) is a South African lawn bowler.

== Bowls career ==
He competed in the men's triples at the 2014 Commonwealth Games where he won a gold medal.

He was selected as part of the South Africa team for the 2018 Commonwealth Games on the Gold Coast in Queensland.

In 2019 he won the triples gold medal at the Atlantic Bowls Championships and in 2020 he was selected for the 2020 World Outdoor Bowls Championship in Australia. In 2022, he competed in the men's pairs and the men's fours at the 2022 Commonwealth Games.

In 2024, Neluonde won the pairs title with Wilson Malobolo, at the South African National Bowls Championships bowling for Bryanston Sports BC.
