= Alan Shaw (bowls) =

Personal information
- Nationality: British (Jersey)
- Born: 4 September 1941 (age 85)

Sport
- Club: Jersey BC
Medal record
Representing Jersey
Atlantic Bowls Championships
Silver medal – second place	2007 Ayr	fours
British Isles Championships
Gold medal – first place	2008	triples

Francis Alan Shaw (born 1941) is a former international lawn bowler from Jersey.

== Bowls career ==
Shaw has represented Jersey at the Commonwealth Games, in the triples at the 2006 Commonwealth Games.

In 2007, he won the fours silver medal at the Atlantic Bowls Championships.

He became a British champion after winning the 2008 triples title, with Cyril Renouf and John Rowcliffe, at the British Isles Bowls Championships.
