= 2000 World Outdoor Bowls Championship – Women's pairs =

World bowls event

World Outdoor Championships 2000 – women's pairs
- 9th World Outdoor Bowls Championships
- Location: Moama, Australia
- Date(s): 8 March - 25 March 2000
- Category: World Outdoor Championships

The 2000 World Outdoor Bowls Championship women's pairs was held in Moama, Australia, from 8 to 25 March 2000.

The gold medal was won by Margaret Letham & Joyce Lindores of Scotland.

== Section tables ==
=== Section A ===
| Pos | Player | P | W | D | L | Pts |
|---|---|---|---|---|---|---|
| 1 | (Scotland) Margaret Letham & Joyce Lindores | 16 | 14 | 0 | 2 | 28 |
| 2 | (England) Jean Baker & Mary Price | 16 | 13 | 1 | 2 | 27 |
| 3 | (New Zealand) Jan Khan & Marlene Castle | 16 | 12 | 1 | 3 | 25 |
| 4 | (Fiji) Litia Tikoisuva & Radhika Prasad | 16 | 11 | 0 | 5 | 22 |
| 5 | (Norfolk Island) Carmen Anderson & Essie Sanchez | 16 | 10 | 1 | 5 | 21 (+119) |
| 6 | (Guernsey) Eunice Trebert & Alison Merrien | 16 | 10 | 1 | 5 | 21 (+61) |
| 7 | (Wales) Ann Sutherland & Rita Jones | 16 | 10 | 0 | 6 | 20 (+122) |
| 8 | Malaysia | 16 | 10 | 0 | 6 | 20 (+53) |
| 9 | Barbara Cameron & Phillis Nolan | 16 | 8 | 1 | 7 | 17 |
| 10 | (Spain) Dorothy North & Doreen Ives | 16 | 7 | 2 | 7 | 16 (+4) |
| 11 | Zambia | 16 | 8 | 0 | 8 | 16 (-30) |
| 12 | (Israel) Merle Swerdlow & Shirley Kantor | 16 | 7 | 0 | 9 | 14 |
| 13 | (Singapore) Philomena Goh & Mary Lim | 16 | 4 | 1 | 11 | 9 |
| 14 | Brazil | 16 | 3 | 0 | 13 | 6 |
| 15 | Kenya | 16 | 2 | 0 | 14 | 4 (-137) |
| 16 | Japan | 16 | 2 | 0 | 14 | 4 (-207) |
| 17 | India | 16 | 1 | 0 | 15 | 2 |

=== Section B ===
| Pos | Player | P | W | D | L | Pts |
|---|---|---|---|---|---|---|
| 1 | (Australia) Karen Murphy & Arrienne Wynen | 16 | 15 | 0 | 1 | 30 |
| 2 | Papua New Guinea | 16 | 13 | 0 | 3 | 26 |
| 3 | (United States) Kottia Spangler & Anne Chenry | 16 | 12 | 0 | 4 | 24 |
| 4 | (Eswatini) Swaziland | 16 | 11 | 0 | 5 | 22 |
| 5 | Namibia | 16 | 9 | 0 | 7 | 18 (+105) |
| 6 | (Jersey) Gean O'Neil & Sheila Syvret | 16 | 9 | 0 | 8 | 18 (+15) |
| 7 | Cook Islands | 16 | 9 | 0 | 7 | 18 (+5) |
| 8 | South Africa | 16 | 8 | 0 | 8 | 16 (+57) |
| 9 | (Hong Kong) Danna Chiu & Anna Clarke | 16 | 8 | 0 | 8 | 16 (+2) |
| 10 | Zimbabwe | 16 | 7 | 0 | 9 | 14 (+55) |
| 11 | (Canada) Jean Roney & Maureen Thompson | 16 | 7 | 0 | 9 | 14 (-4) |
| 12 | Thailand | 16 | 7 | 0 | 9 | 14 (-123) |
| 13 | Samoa | 16 | 6 | 0 | 10 | 12 |
| 14 | Netherlands | 16 | 5 | 0 | 11 | 10 |
| 15 | Botswana | 16 | 4 | 0 | 12 | 8 |
| 16 | Argentina | 16 | 3 | 0 | 13 | 6 (-130) |
| 17 | (Brunei) Amalia Matali & Suhana Mohd Daud | 16 | 3 | 0 | 13 | 6 (-240) |

== Results ==
Women's pairs section A
| Round 1 - (8 Mar) | | |
| Fiji | Ireland | 24–16 |
| Malaysia | New Zealand | 26–17 |
| England | Brazil | 34–7 |
| Guernsey | Singapore | 22–16 |
| Wales | Japan | 34–14 |
| Israel | Spain | 31–29 |
| Zambia | Kenya | 16–15 |
| Norfolk Island | India | 58–7 |
| Round 2 - (8 Mar) | | |
| Scotland | Spain | 22–17 |
| England | Malaysia | 22–13 |
| Ireland | India | 44–7 |
| Fiji | Singapore | 32–10 |
| Wales | Zambia | 27–10 |
| Brazil | Israel | 23–19 |
| Norfolk Island | Kenya | 29–10 |
| New Zealand | Guernsey | 26–7 |
| Round 3 - (9 Mar) | | |
| Scotland | Kenya | 32–7 |
| Ireland | Malaysia | 20–17 |
| England | New Zealand | 28–20 |
| Wales | Israel | 26–15 |
| Japan | India | 34–14 |
| Zambia | Fiji | 31–22 |
| Norfolk Island | Spain | 23–23 |
| Guernsey | Brazil | 30–9 |
| Round 4 - (9 Mar) | | |
| Scotland | Norfolk Island | 32–10 |
| Ireland | Israel | 32–18 |
| England | Wales | 31–9 |
| New Zealand | Zambia | 26–12 |
| Guernsey | Fiji | 26–23 |
| Brazil | Kenya | 17–15 |
| Malaysia | India | 36–12 |
| Singapore | Japan | 17–12 |
| Round 5 - (10 Mar) | | |
| Scotland | India | 43–5 |
| Wales | Spain | 36–9 |
| England | Singapore | 21–21 |
| Ireland | Brazil | 25–13 |
| Malaysia | Norfolk Island | 16–14 |
| Israel | Kenya | 21–15 |
| Guernsey | Zambia | 34–16 |
| Fiji | Japan | 24–9 |
| Round 6 - (10 Mar) | | |
| Spain | Ireland | 22–20 |
| New Zealand | Wales | 24–15 |
| Scotland | Zambia | 33–8 |
| England | Kenya | 25–9 |
| Singapore | Brazil | 30–9 |
| Guernsey | Japan | 34–12 |
| Fiji | Malaysia | 24–14 |
| Norfolk Island | Israel | 27–16 |
| Round 7 - (10 Mar) | | |
| Ireland | Wales | 22–16 |
| Fiji | England | 24–18 |
| Scotland | Brazil | 30–7 |
| Zambia | Malaysia | 24–18 |
| Singapore | Kenya | 23–17 |
| Spain | Guernsey | 17–17 |
| Japan | Israel | 19–17 |
| New Zealand | India | 40–9 |
| Round 8 - (11 Mar) | | |
| Scotland | Japan | 34–8 |
| Malaysia | Spain | 21–15 |
| Israel | Zambia | 16–15 |
| New Zealand | Kenya | 33–12 |
| England | India | 45–7 |
| Fiji | Brazil | 37–14 |
| Wales | Singapore | 20–14 |
| Norfolk Island | Guernsey | 24–13 |
| Round 9 - (11 Mar) | | |
| England | Scotland | 20–15 |
| Zambia | Singapore | 23–16 |
| Spain | Brazil | 30–18 |
| Israel | Malaysia | 20–16 |
| Norfolk Island | Ireland | 26–17 |
| New Zealand | Japan | 24–18 |
| Wales | Fiji | 23–20 |
| Kenya | India | 30–10 |
| Round 10 - (12 Mar) | | |
| Scotland | Israel | 24–17 |
| Wales | Norfolk Island | 24–13 |
| Malaysia | Brazil | 37–9 |
| Singapore | India | 34–8 |
| Ireland | Kenya | 28–12 |
| Fiji | New Zealand | 19–18 |
| Spain | Japan | 25–18 |
| Guernsey | England | 18–16 |
| Round 11 - (12 Mar) | | |
| Spain | Kenya | 29–16 |
| Malaysia | Singapore | 22–15 |
| Zambia | India | 27–17 |
| New Zealand | Brazil | 30–11 |
| England | Japan | 32–4 |
| Guernsey | Ireland | 26–16 |
| Scotland | Wales | 32–9 |
| Norfolk Island | Fiji | 18–11 |
| Round 12 - (13 Mar) | | |
| Brazil | Japan | 25–12 |
| England | Israel | 30–17 |
| Guernsey | Wales | 20–19 |
| Fiji | Kenya | 22–14 |
| Spain | India | 36–12 |
| Zambia | Ireland | 26–17 |
| Norfolk Island | Singapore | 22–14 |
| New Zealand | Scotland | 23–15 |
| Round 13 - (13 Mar) | | |
| Wales | Kenya | 28–12 |
| Ireland | Singapore | 25–10 |
| India | Brazil | 20–19 |
| Zambia | Japan | 36–11 |
| Scotland | Malaysia | 22–14 |
| New Zealand | Norfolk Island | 19–14 |
| Israel | Guernsey | 29–7 |
| Fiji | Spain | 28–15 |
| Round 14 - (14 Mar) | | |
| Scotland | Ireland | 27–17 |
| Norfolk Island | Japan | 32–16 |
| Malaysia | Kenya | 21–18 |
| Israel | Singapore | 28–8 |
| England | Zambia | 20–15 |
| Guernsey | India | 32–8 |
| New Zealand | Spain | 18–16 |
| Wales | Brazil | 26–12 |
| Round 15 - (14 Mar) | | |
| Malaysia | Japan | 23–15 |
| Fiji | Israel | 29–9 |
| Scotland | Guernsey | 20–19 |
| England | Norfolk Island | 37–12 |
| New Zealand | Ireland | 18–18 |
| Spain | Singapore | 18–17 |
| Zambia | Brazil | 25–18 |
| Wales | India | 64–1 |
| Round 16 - (15 Mar) | | |
| England | Ireland | 33–18 |
| Scotland | Fiji | 15–14 |
| New Zealand | Singapore | 17–11 |
| Spain | Zambia | 21–17 |
| Guernsey | Malaysia | 24–15 |
| Israel | India | 56–7 |
| Norfolk Island | Brazil | 39–6 |
| Kenya | Japan | 19–16 |
| Round 17 - (15 Mar) | | |
| Malaysia | Wales | 24–19 |
| England | Spain | 15–12 |
| Ireland | Japan | 32–6 |
| Scotland | Singapore | 31–18 |
| Norfolk Island | Zambia | 29–10 |
| New Zealand | Israel | 31–10 |
| Fiji | India | 31–11 |
| Guernsey | Kenya | 27–19 |

Women's pairs section B
| Round 1 - (8 Mar) | | |
| Jersey | South Africa | 30–18 |
| Hong Kong | Namibia | 22–16 |
| Brunei | Zimbabwe | 21–16 |
| (Eswatini) Swaziland | Botswana | 18–13 |
| Australia | Thailand | 30–12 |
| Canada | Netherlands | 23–18 |
| Cook Islands | Argentina | 18–17 |
| United States | Samoa | 27–12 |
| Round 2 - (8 Mar) | | |
| Namibia | Cook Islands | 23–15 |
| Netherlands | Jersey | 19–12 |
| South Africa | Argentina | 41–15 |
| Hong Kong | Zimbabwe | 21–19 |
| United States | Brunei | 22–21 |
| Papua New Guinea | Samoa | 33–15 |
| (Eswatini) Swaziland | Canada | 24–8 |
| Australia | Botswana | 39–6 |
| Round 3 - (9 Mar) | | |
| Canada | Samoa | 23–10 |
| Cook Islands | Brunei | 21–13 |
| Australia | United States | 43–8 |
| Thailand | Netherlands | 24–19 |
| Papua New Guinea | (Eswatini) Swaziland | 25–17 |
| South Africa | Botswana | 38–13 |
| Namibia | Zimbabwe | 26–17 |
| Jersey | Hong Kong | 21–19 |
| Round 4 - (9 Mar) | | |
| Australia | Zimbabwe | 30–13 |
| Papua New Guinea | Canada | 29–10 |
| Botswana | Namibia | 21–14 |
| United States | Jersey | 27–13 |
| (Eswatini) Swaziland | Brunei | 33–9 |
| South Africa | Cook Islands | 22–14 |
| Hong Kong | Netherlands | 31–15 |
| Thailand | Argentina | 22–14 |
| Round 5 - (10 Mar) | | |
| Papua New Guinea | Netherlands | 28–18 |
| Hong Kong | Canada | 24–14 |
| (Eswatini) Swaziland | United States | 18–16 |
| Samoa | Australia | 23–14 |
| Jersey | Brunei | 25–10 |
| Botswana | Cook Islands | 23–12 |
| South Africa | Thailand | 32–11 |
| Zimbabwe | Argentina | 29–12 |
| Round 6 - (10 Mar) | | |
| Cook Islands | Thailand | 28–8 |
| Samoa | Jersey | 21–18 |
| Brunei | Argentina | 17–14 |
| (Eswatini) Swaziland | Zimbabwe | 20–18 |
| Papua New Guinea | Botswana | 36–13 |
| United States | Canada | 21–14 |
| Australia | Namibia | 24–12 |
| Hong Kong | South Africa | 21–12 |
| Round 7 - (10 Mar) | | |
| Zimbabwe | South Africa | 24–13 |
| Argentina | (Eswatini) Swaziland | 24–15 |
| Botswana | Hong Kong | 23–9 |
| United States | Thailand | 30–12 |
| Namibia | Netherlands | 34–10 |
| Papua New Guinea | Brunei | 43–9 |
| Cook Islands | Samoa | 36–6 |
| Australia | Jersey | 20–15 |
| Round 8 - (11 Mar) | | |
| Samoa | Hong Kong | 28–20 |
| United States | Botswana | 27–13 |
| Papua New Guinea | Thailand | 48–16 |
| Cook Islands | Canada | 24–21 |
| Australia | Argentina | 36–12 |
| (Eswatini) Swaziland | Namibia | 22–21 |
| Zimbabwe | Netherlands | 28–6 |
| South Africa | Brunei | 37–5 |
| Round 9 - (11 Mar) | | |
| Australia | South Africa | 32–8 |
| Argentina | Botswana | 27–17 |
| United States | Hong Kong | 20–16 |
| Jersey | Canada | 19–16 |
| Papua New Guinea | Zimbabwe | 18–12 |
| (Eswatini) Swaziland | Netherlands | 25–16 |
| Thailand | Namibia | 23–22 |
| Samoa | Brunei | 25–14 |
| Round 10 - (12 Mar) | | |
| Netherlands | Argentina | 28–14 |
| (Eswatini) Swaziland | Jersey | 27–12 |
| Cook Islands | Zimbabwe | 22–20 |
| United States | Papua New Guinea | 31–10 |
| South Africa | Namibia | 23–16 |
| Thailand | Samoa | 24–19 |
| Hong Kong | Brunei | 43–14 |
| Australia | Canada | 23–18 |
| Round 11 - (12 Mar) | | |
| {{}} | {{}} | – |
| {{}} | {{}} | – |
| {{}} | {{}} | – |
| {{}} | (Eswatini) Swaziland | – |
| {{}} | {{}} | – |
| {{}} | {{}} | – |
| {{}} | {{}} | – |
| {{}} | {{}} | – |
| Round 12 - (13 Mar) | | |
| Thailand | Brunei | 20–16 |
| Namibia | Papua New Guinea | 24–16 |
| (Eswatini) Swaziland | South Africa | 21–18 |
| Netherlands | Samoa | 36–11 |
| Jersey | Botswana | 20–17 |
| Australia | Cook Islands | 31–10 |
| Canada | Argentina | 26–18 |
| United States | Zimbabwe | 20–19 |
| Round 13 - (13 Mar) | | |
| Australia | (Eswatini) Swaziland | 24–13 |
| Papua New Guinea | Hong Kong | 27–15 |
| Jersey | Argentina | 24–17 |
| South Africa | Samoa | 35–10 |
| Cook Islands | United States | 23–13 |
| Canada | Namibia | 23–21 |
| Thailand | Botswana | 22–20 |
| Netherlands | Brunei | 19–18 |
| Round 14 - (14 Mar) | | |
| Canada | Thailand | 28–9 |
| Zimbabwe | Botswana | 23–14 |
| Cook Islands | Netherlands | 17–16 |
| Australia | Brunei | 53–7 |
| Papua New Guinea | Jersey | 27–17 |
| United States | Argentina | 26–16 |
| Hong Kong | (Eswatini) Swaziland | 21–18 |
| Namibia | Samoa | 27–18 |
| Round 15 - (14 Mar) | | |
| Papua New Guinea | Cook Islands | 20–18 |
| Australia | Netherlands | 24–18 |
| Hong Kong | Thailand | 23–17 |
| Zimbabwe | Canada | 22–13 |
| Samoa | Argentina | 21–9 |
| Brunei | Botswana | 21–16 |
| United States | South Africa | 33–18 |
| Namibia | Jersey | 26–16 |
| Round 16 - (15 Mar) | | |
| {{}} | {{}} | – |
| {{}} | {{}} | – |
| {{}} | (Eswatini) Swaziland | – |
| {{}} | {{}} | – |
| {{}} | {{}} | – |
| {{}} | {{}} | – |
| {{}} | {{}} | – |
| {{}} | {{}} | – |
| Round 17 - (15 Mar) | | |
| {{}} | {{}} | – |
| {{}} | {{}} | – |
| {{}} | (Eswatini) Swaziland | – |
| {{}} | {{}} | – |
| {{}} | {{}} | – |
| {{}} | {{}} | – |
| {{}} | {{}} | – |
| {{}} | {{}} | – |

== Bronze medal match ==
England beat Papua New Guinea 21-17

== Gold medal match ==
Scotland beat Australia 17-13
