= Stuart Milligan (bowls) =

Personal information
- Nationality: South African

Sport
- Sport: Lawn bowls
- Club: Durban BC
Medal record
Representing South Africa
Atlantic Bowls Championships
Gold medal – first place	2009 Johannesburg	triples
Gold medal – first place	2009 Johannesburg	fours

Stuart Milligan is a South African international lawn bowler.

== Bowls career ==
In 2009, he won the triples and fours gold medals at the Atlantic Bowls Championships.
