= Sam Barkley (bowls) =

Irish bowls player

Personal information
- Nationality: British (Northern Irish)
- Born: 28 March 1999 (age 27)

Sport
- Club: Old Bleach (outdoor); County Antrim (indoor)
Medal record
Representing Northern Ireland
Commonwealth Games
Gold medal – first place	2022 Birmingham	fours
Irish Nationals
Gold medal – first place	2021	pairs

Sam Barkley (born 28 March 1999 in Northern Ireland) is a combined Irish international lawn and indoor bowler.

== Bowls career ==
Barkley made his indoor bowling debut for Ireland in 2016. In 2020, he won the Junior singles at the British Isles Indoor Championships.

He made his debut at the World Championships during the 2021 World Indoor Bowls Championship competing in the singles and pairs. In 2021, he became a National champion after winning the pairs with Martin McHugh at the Irish National Bowls Championships.

In 2022, he competed in the men's pairs and the men's fours at the 2022 Commonwealth Games. In the fours the team of Barkley, Adam McKeown, Ian McClure and Martin McHugh won the gold medal defeating India in the final.

== Personal life ==
He is a plumber by trade.
