= Jess Sims =

Welsh bowls player

Personal information
- Nationality: Welsh
- Born: Jessica Williams; 3 October 1990 (age 35) Hereford, Herefordshire

Sport
- Sport: Lawn & indoor bowls
- Club: Llandrindod Wells Bowling Club
Medal record
Representing Wales
World Outdoor Championships
Gold medal – first place	2016 Christchurch	pairs
Silver medal – second place	2016 Christchurch	team
Atlantic Bowls Championships
Silver medal – second place	2015 Paphos	fours
British Isles Championships
Gold medal – first place	2011	fours
Gold medal – first place	2015	pairs

Jess Sims née Jessica Williams (born 1990) is a Welsh international lawn and indoor bowler. Jess has represented Wales for many years in Junior and Senior squads. In 2015 she won the fours silver medal at the Atlantic Bowls Championships.

In 2016, she won the gold medal with Laura Thomas in the pairs at the 2016 World Outdoor Bowls Championship in Christchurch.

She was selected as part of the Welsh team for the 2018 Commonwealth Games on the Gold Coast in Queensland
