= Scott Ruderham =

British lawn bowler

Personal information
- Nickname: The Smoke
- Nationality: British (Jersey)
- Born: 25 August 1988 (age 37)

Sport
- Sport: Lawn bowls
- Club: Sun BC
Medal record
Representing Jersey
Atlantic Bowls Championships
Gold medal – first place	2015 Paphos	fours
Silver medal – second place	2019 Cardiff	fours
British Isles Championships
Gold medal – first place	2016 Llandrindod	fours

Scott Ruderham (born 1988) is an international lawn bowler from Jersey.

== Bowls career ==
Ruderham became a British champion in 2016 after winning the fours at the British Isles Bowls Championships.

In 2015 he won the fours gold medal at the Atlantic Bowls Championships and fours years later won a silver medal in the same event at the Championships. He represented Jersey in the 2016 World Outdoor Bowls Championship in Christchurch, New Zealand, in the pairs and fours.

In 2021 Ruderham won his first Sun Bowls Club Singles Championship. In October 2021, Ruderham was selected to represent Jersey in the 2022 Commonwealth Games being held in Birmingham. He duly competed in the men's triples and the men's fours at the Games.

Ruderham has also represented Jersey at darts, making his debut in 2016.
