= Sian Honnor =

British bowls player (born 1988)

Personal information
- Nationality: British (English)
- Born: Sian Gordon; 14 January 1988 (age 38) Canterbury, England

Achievements and titles
- Highest world ranking: 39 (August 2026)
Medal record
Women's lawn bowls
Representing England
Commonwealth Games
Bronze medal – third place	2010 Delhi	women's triples
Gold medal – first place	2014 Glasgow	women's triples
Bronze medal – third place	2018 Gold Coast	women's triples
Gold medal – first place	2022 Birmingham	women's triples
Gold medal – first place	2026 Glasgow	women's pairs
Atlantic Bowls Championships
Gold medal – first place	2011 Paphos	fours
Gold medal – first place	2019 Cardiff	triples

Sian Honnor (née Gordon, born 14 January 1988, in Canterbury) is an English international lawn bowler from Whitstable. She reached a highest world ranking of 39 in August 2026.

== Bowls career ==
=== Outdoors ===
She first represented England on the world stage when she competed in the Commonwealth Youth Games in Bendigo in 2004, winning a bronze medal in the mixed pairs with Jamie Chestney.

She represented England at the 2010 Commonwealth Games where she won, with Jamie-Lea Winch and Sandy Hazell, a bronze medal in the woman's triples competition.

At the 2011 Atlantic Bowls Championships, Gordon won Gold in the Ladies Fours and Ladies Team Events. She won Gold in the Ladies Fours with Julie Saunders, Ellen Falkner and Amy Gowshall. Gordon competed in the 2014 Commonwealth Games and won Gold in the Ladies Triples event with Sophie Tolchard and Ellen Falkner. In 2014 she was a National triples champion.

She was selected as part of the English team for the 2018 Commonwealth Games on the Gold Coast in Queensland where she won a bronze medal in the Triples with Katherine Rednall and Ellen Falkner.

In 2019 she won the triples gold medal at the Atlantic Bowls Championships and in 2020 she was selected for the 2020 World Outdoor Bowls Championship in Australia.

In 2022, she competed in the women's triples and the Women's fours at the 2022 Commonwealth Games. She won the gold medal in the triples with Jamie Lea Winch and Natalie Chestney.

=== Indoors ===
She won the EIBA women's national singles for the second time in 2025, adding to her numerous national titles including Under 25 singles twice, National Fours twice and National Triples.

Playing with Amy Pharaoh, she won the gold medal in the women's pairs at the 2026 Commonwealth Games which was held on an indoor green in Glasgow, defeating Syafiqa Haidar and Aleena Nawawi of Malaysia in the final.

== Personal life ==
She works in communications for a homelessness charity in Kent. She is a former editor for 'Bowls International' magazine and commentates for the BBC during the World Indoor Bowls Championships.
