= Sandy Hazell =

English indoor and lawn bowler (born 1965)

Personal information
- Nationality: English
- Born: 24 September 1965 (age 60)
Medal record
Representing England
Commonwealth Games
| Bronze medal – third place | 2010 Delhi | Women's triples |
World Indoor Bowls Championships
| Gold medal – first place | 1996 Guernsey | Women's singles |

Sandy Hazell is an English international indoor and lawn bowler.

== Bowls career ==
Hazell won the women's singles at the 1996 World Indoor Bowls Championship before representing England at the 2010 Commonwealth Games where she won, with Jamie-Lea Winch and Sian Gordon, a bronze medal in the woman's triples competition.

In 2012, she won the Hong Kong International Bowls Classic singles title. Two years later in 2014, she was appointed England captain.

In 2023, she was named as the England team manager for the 2023 World Outdoor Bowls Championship.
