= Jarrad Breen =

Welsh lawn bowler (born 1992)

Personal information
- Nationality: British (Welsh)
- Born: 6 October 1992 (age 33)
- Home town: Tonyrefail, Wales

Sport
- Sport: Lawn bowls
- Club: Harlequins BC (outdoors); Cynon Valley (indoors)

Achievements and titles
- Highest world ranking: 36 (August 2024)
Medal record
Men's bowls
Representing Wales
Commonwealth Games
Gold medal – first place	2022 Birmingham	Men's pairs
British Isles Championships
Gold medal – first place	2018	fours
Gold medal – first place	2019	triples
Welsh Nationals
Gold medal – first place	2017, 2024	fours
Gold medal – first place	2018	triples

Jarrad Breen (born 6 October 1992) is a Welsh international lawn and indoor bowler.

== Early life and family ==
Breen was born on 6 October 1992 and attended Tonyrefail Comprehensive School. His brother Jack Breen is also an international bowler.

== Bowls career ==
Breen became a National champion in 2017 when he won the fours title at the Welsh National Bowls Championships and the following year became a National champion for the second time, after winning the triples title. He also won the 2017 IIBC Championships singles. In 2021, Breen reached the final of the pairs and fours at the 2021 Welsh National Bowls Championships.

In 2022, he competed in the men's pairs and the men's fours at the 2022 Commonwealth Games. Partnering Daniel Salmon he won the pairs gold medal.

In 2023, he was selected as part of the team to represent Wales at the 2023 World Outdoor Bowls Championship. He participated in the men's pairs and the men's fours events. In the pairs with Daniel Salmon, they reached the quarter finals before losing to Malaysia.
