= Lawn bowls at the 2022 Commonwealth Games – Men's pairs =

Bowls event

Lawn bowls men's pairs at the 2022 Commonwealth Games
- Venue: Victoria Park
- Dates: 29 July – 2 August 2022
- Competitors: 38 from 19 nations

Medalists
gold medal	Daniel Salmon; Jarrad Breen	Wales
silver medal	Jamie Walker; Sam Tolchard	England
bronze medal	Paul Foster; Alex Marshall	Scotland

Lawn bowls at the 2022 Commonwealth Games – Men's pairs was held at the Victoria Park from July 29 to August 2. A total of 38 athletes from 19 associations participated in the event. Daniel Salmon and Jarrad Breen of Wales won the gold medal, defeating England's Jamie Walker and Sam Tolchard in the final. Paul Foster and Alex Marshall from Scotland won the bronze medal.

== Sectional play ==
The top two from each section advance to the knockout stage.

=== Section A ===
Rank	Nation	Athletes	MP	MW	MT	ML	FR	AG	PD	PTS
1	Northern Ireland	Sam Barkley, Martin McHugh	4	3	0	1	82	44	+38	9
2	Wales	Daniel Salmon, Jarrad Breen	4	3	0	1	79	52	+27	9
3	Namibia	John-Pierre Fouche, Carel Olivier	4	2	0	2	72	59	+13	6
4	Norfolk Island	John Christian, Tim Sheridan	4	1	0	3	64	70	-7	3
5	Jamaica	Robert Simpson, Mervyn Edwards	4	1	0	3	36	108	-72	3

	Jamaica	Namibia	Norfolk Island	Northern Ireland	Wales
Jamaica	—	4–33	17–16	7–26	8–33
Namibia	33–4	—	19–12	6–27	14–16
Norfolk Island	16–17	12–19	—	20–15	16–19
Northern Ireland	26–7	27–6	15–20	—	14–11
Wales	33–8	16–14	19–16	11–14	—

=== Section B ===
Rank	Nation	Athletes	MP	MW	MT	ML	FR	AG	PD	PTS
1	Scotland	Paul Foster, Alex Marshall	4	4	0	0	103	40	+39	12
2	Jersey	Derek Boswell, Ross Davis	4	2	1	1	69	59	+10	7
3	Canada	John Bezear, Ryan Bester	4	2	0	2	59	58	+1	6
4	New Zealand	Tony Grantham, Shannon McIlroy	4	1	1	2	60	59	+1	4
5	Niue	Tukala Tagelagi, Dalton Tagelagi	4	0	0	4	42	93	-51	0

	Canada	Jersey	Niue	New Zealand	Scotland
Canada	—	13–20	20–9	15–11	11–18
Jersey	20–13	—	27–9	15–15	7–22
Niue	9–20	9–27	—	14–23	10–23
New Zealand	11–15	15–15	23–14	—	11–15
Scotland	18–11	22–7	23–10	15–11	—

=== Section C ===
Rank	Nation	Athletes	MP	MW	MT	ML	FR	AG	PD	PTS
1	England	Jamie Walker, Sam Tolchard	4	3	0	1	103	40	+63	9
2	India	Sunil Bahadur, Dinesh Kumar	4	3	0	1	83	44	+39	9
3	Malaysia	Idham Amin Ramlan, Fairul Izwan Abd Muin	4	3	0	1	81	56	+25	9
4	Cook Islands	Alex Kairua, Phillip Jim	4	1	0	3	53	66	-13	3
5	Falkland Islands	Chris Locke, Garry Tyrrell	4	0	0	4	27	141	-114	0

	Cook Islands	England	Falkland Islands	India	Malaysia
Cook Islands	—	7–20	23–12	8–15	15–19
England	20–7	—	47–5	15–18	21–10
Falkland Islands	12–23	5–47	—	4–36	6–35
India	15–8	18–15	36–4	—	14–17
Malaysia	19–15	10–21	35–6	17–14	—

=== Section D ===
Rank	Nation	Athletes	MP	MW	MT	ML	FR	AG	PD	PTS
1	South Africa	Prince Neluonde, Wayne Rittmuller	3	3	0	0	56	35	+21	9
2	Fiji	Kushal Pillay, Rajnesh Prasad	3	2	0	1	66	48	+18	6
3	Australia	Corey Wedlock, Aaron Wilson	3	1	0	2	53	51	+2	3
4	Guernsey	Matt Solway, Todd Priaulx	3	0	0	3	34	75	-41	0

	Australia	Fiji	Guernsey	South Africa
Australia	—	16–27	29–7	8–17
Fiji	27–16	—	25–14	14–18
Guernsey	7–29	14–25	—	13–21
South Africa	17–8	18–14	21–13	—

== Knockout stage ==
Quarterfinals
A1	Northern Ireland	26
C2	India	8
D1	South Africa	11
A2	Wales	16
B1	Scotland	20
D2	Fiji	7
C1	England	19
B2	Jersey	6

Semifinals
A1	Northern Ireland	14
A2	Wales	22
B1	Scotland	13
C1	England	19

Final
A2	Wales	19
C1	England	18
Third place
A1	Northern Ireland	5
B1	Scotland	25
