= Atlantic Bowls Championships =

International lawn bowling competition

Tournament information
- Sport: Lawn bowls
- Location: Various
- Established: 1993
- Defunct: 2021
- Administrator: World Bowls

The Atlantic Bowls Championships was a lawn bowling competition held between national bowls organisations in the Atlantic region. The event was a qualifying event for the World Outdoor Bowls Championships until the 2021 announcement that it would no longer be held. Originally the Championships were for women only and were called the Atlantic Rim Championships. In 2007 men competed for the first time at the event.

The 2001 tournament due to be held in Namibia was cancelled due to opposition from the Namibia Sports Commission. The next tournament was held in 2005.

In 2021, the 2020 World Outdoor Bowls Championship was officially cancelled due to the COVID-19 pandemic. World Bowls then decided that the World Championships would take place every two years starting in 2023. This also resulted in the fact that qualifying events for the Championships were no longer required meaning the Atlantic Championships and Asia Pacific Bowls Championships were terminated.

== 1993 Florida, United States ==
Inaugural event held at Sun City Center 19–31 October. For women only and medals determined by round robin.

| Event | Gold | Silver | Bronze |
|---|---|---|---|
| Women's Singles | (England) Norma Shaw | (Wales) Rita Jones | (South Africa) Barbara Redshaw |
| Women's Pairs | Barbara Cameron; Phillis Nolan | (England) Norma Shaw; Gwen Daniel | (Namibia) Cathelean du Plessis; Anne Ainsworth |
| Women's Triples | (Wales) Mary Davies; Val Howell; Rita Jones | (England) Edna Bessell; Shirley Page; Margaret Heggie | (Guernsey) Jean Simon; Eunice Thompson; Sally Paul |
| Women's Fours | (Scotland) Sarah Gourlay; Senga McCrone; Janice Maxwell; Frances Whyte | (Wales) Mary Davies; Val Howell; Linda Evans; Betty Morgan | (England) Edna Bessell; Gwen Daniel; Shirley Page; Margaret Heggie |

== 1995 Durban, South Africa ==
18-30 April, for women only and medals determined by round robin.

| Event | Gold | Silver | Bronze |
|---|---|---|---|
| Women's Singles | (South Africa) Jo Peacock | (England) Norma Shaw | Phillis Nolan |
| Women's Pairs | (South Africa) Lorna Trigwell; Jo Peacock | (England) Gill Fitzgerald; Norma Shaw | Barbara Cameron; Phillis Nolan |
| Women's Triples | (South Africa) Lyn Dwyer; Hester Bekker; Colleen Grondein | (Wales) Ann Sutherland; Judith Wason; Rita Jones | (Jersey) Denise Falkner; Jean Jones; Val Stead |
| Women's Fours | (Scotland) Betty Forsyth; Frances Whyte; Liz Dickson; Eleanor Allan | (South Africa) Lorna Trigwell; Lyn Dwyer; Hester Bekker; Colleen Grondein | (England) Gill Fitzgerald; Mary Price; Jean Baker; Norma Hazzledine |

== 1997 Llandrindod Wells, Wales ==
22 August-2 September, for women only and medals determined by round robin of 12 teams.

| Event | Gold | Silver | Bronze |
|---|---|---|---|
| Women's Singles | (England) Mary Price | Margaret Johnston | (Wales) Betty Morgan |
| Women's Pairs | (England) Katherine Hawes; Mary Price | Phillis Nolan; Margaret Johnston | (Guernsey) Jean Simon; Anne Simon |
| Women's Triples | (Wales) Sarah Mansbridge; Betty Morgan; Kathy Pearce | (Jersey) Alison Birch; Karina Horman; Jean Lowery | (Scotland) Kathy Houston; Susan Kelly; Joyce Lindores |
| Women's Fours | (South Africa) Jannie de Beer; Barbara Redshaw; Lorna Trigwell; Hester Bekker | (Wales) Sarah Mansbridge; Nina Shipperlee; Kathy Pearce; Rita Jones | (Scotland) Susan Kelly; Janice Maxwell; Sarah Gourlay; Kathy Houston |

== 1999 Cape Town, South Africa ==
Goodwood BC, 21–28 March, for women only. The tournament grew from 12 teams to 16 teams and was organised into two groups of eight, with the winners of each group meeting in the final.

| Event | Gold | Silver |
|---|---|---|
| Women's Singles | Margaret Johnston | (Scotland) Margaret Letham |
| Women's Pairs | (Scotland) Margaret Letham; Joyce Lindores | (South Africa) Lesley Hartwell; Hester Bekker |
| Women's Triples | Donna McNally; Dorothy Kane; Margaret Johnston | (Eswatini) Dawn Squires; Wendy Vickery; Mariana Goddard |
| Women's Fours | (South Africa) Trish Steyn; Ellen Cawker; Hester Bekker; Lorna Trigwell | (England) Katherine Hawes; Catherine Popple; Mary Price; Norma Shaw |

== 2005 Bangor, Northern Ireland ==
Ward Park, 13–23 August. For women only and only one bronze medal awarded.

| Event | Gold | Silver | Bronze |
|---|---|---|---|
| Women's Singles | (Scotland) Kay Moran | (Wales) Betty Morgan MBE | (Jersey) Gean O'Neil |
| Women's Pairs | (South Africa) Sharon Glenn; Esme Steyn | (Scotland) Margaret Letham; Joyce Lindores | (England) Michelle Barlow; Edna Bessell |
| Women's Triples | (England) Sue Harriott; Ellen Falkner; Doreen Hankin | (Israel) Tami Kamzel; Naomi Fix; Irit Grenchel | (Jersey) Christine Grimes; Gean O'Neil; Gina le Long |
| Women's Fours | (England) Sue Harriott; Edna Bessell; Ellen Falkner; Doreen Hankin | (Scotland) Joyce Lindores; Margaret Letham; Betty Forsyth; Seona Black | Donna McNally; Lisa McDonagh; Mandy Cunningham; Chrissie O'Gorman |

== 2007 Ayr, Scotland ==
Ayr Northfield BC - 13–22 July 2007, third place playoffs determined bronze medal.

| Event | Gold | Silver | Bronze |
|---|---|---|---|
| Men's Singles | (Canada) Ryan Bester | (Guernsey) Matt Le Ber | (Jersey) Jamie MacDonald |
| Men's Pairs | (Wales) Martin Selway; Robert Horgan | (Jersey) Derek Boswell; Cyril Renouf | (Scotland) David Kelly; Darren Burnett |
| Men's Triples | (Wales) Neil Rees; Mike Prosser; Andrew Atwood | Michael Higgins; Gary McCloy; Clifford Craig | (Guernsey) Paul Wakeham; Len Le Ber; Ian Merrien |
| Men's Fours | (South Africa) Gerry Baker; Billy Radloff; Clinton Roets; Handré Marais | (Jersey) Cyril Renouf; Derek Boswell; Alan Shaw; Thomas Greechan | (Wales) Martin Selway; Robert Horgan; Neil Rees; Andrew Atwood |
| Women's Singles | (South Africa) Colleen Webb | (Israel) Ruthie Gilor | Jennifer Dowds |
| Women's Pairs | (Scotland) Kay Moran; Margaret Letham | (Canada) Clarice Fitzpatrick; Shirley Fitzpatrick-Wong | (Israel) Irit Grenchel; Ruthie Gilor |
| Women's Triples | (England) Lynne Whitehead; Jean Baker; Amy Monkhouse | (Wales) Isabel Jones; Anwen Butten; Kathy Pearce | (Canada) Shirley Ko; Kelly McKerihen; Harriette Pituley |
| Women's Fours | (Jersey) Lindsey Greechan; Christine Grimes; Joan Renouf; Liz Cole | (South Africa) Cheryl Cox; Loraine Victor; Sylvia Burns; Lorna Trigwell | (Canada) Kelly McKerihen; Shirley Fitzpatrick-Wong; Clarice Fitzpatrick; Harriette Pituley |

== 2009 Johannesburg, South Africa ==
The Wanderers 3–16 May 2009

| Event | Gold | Silver | Bronze | Bronze |
|---|---|---|---|---|
| Men's Singles | (South Africa) Gerry Baker | (England) Sam Tolchard | (Wales) Jason Greenslade | (Israel) Boaz Markus |
| Men's Pairs | (Wales) Jason Greenslade; Robert Weale | | | |
| Men's Triples | (South Africa) Wayne Perry; Stuart Milligan; Bobby Donnelly | (England) Sam Tolchard; Stuart Airey; Graham Shadwell | (Wales) Martin Selway; David Harding; Marc Wyatt | Myles Greenfield |
| Men's Fours | (South Africa) Wayne Perry; Johann Pierre du Plessis; Stuart Milligan; Bobby Donnelly | (England) Mark Bantock; Stuart Airey; Robert Newman; Graham Shadwell | (Wales) Martin Selway; David Harding; Marc Wyatt; Robert Weale | (Jersey) Derek Boswell; John Lowery; Terry Allen; Cyril Renouf |
| Women's Singles | (Israel) Ruthie Gilor | (Wales) Kathy Pearce | (Netherlands) Saskia Schaft | (England) Ellen Falkner |
| Women's Pairs | (Scotland) Caroline Brown; Margaret Letham | (England) Edna Bessell; Ellen Falkner | Jennifer Dowds; Bernie O'Neill | |
| Women's Triples | (Wales) Isabel Jones; Wendy Price; Kathy Pearce | (Namibia) Beatrix Lamprecht | (South Africa) Sylvia Burns; Jenny Jones; Pam Landau | |
| Women's Fours | (Wales) Hannah Smith; Wendy Price; Isabel Jones; Anwen Butten | (South Africa) Sylvia Burns; Jenny Jones; Pam Landau; Susan Nel | (United States) Marita Nierth; Irene Webster; Jan Hargraves; Maryna Hyland | Karen Woodside; Mandy Cunningham; Bernie O'Neill; Sandra Bailie |

== 2011 Paphos, Cyprus ==
Athena Beach Hotel, 17–30 October 2011

| Event | Gold | Silver | Bronze | Bronze |
|---|---|---|---|---|
| Men's Singles | (England) Jamie Chestney | (Wales) Jonathan Tomlinson | (Jersey) Malcolm De Sousa | (South Africa) Bobby Donnelly |
| Men's Pairs | (South Africa) Bobby Donnelly; Gerry Baker | Ian McClure; Gary Kelly | (Scotland) Grant Logan; David Peacock | (Jersey) Malcolm De Sousa; Michael Rive |
| Men's Triples | (England) John Hick; Graham Shadwell; Jamie Chestney | (Scotland) Martyn Rice; Alister Kennedy; Graeme Archer | (South Africa) Wayne Parry; Clinton Roets; Gidion Vermeulen | (Cyprus) Loukas Paraskeva |
| Men's Fours | (Scotland) Martyn Rice; Alister Kennedy; Grant Logan; Graeme Archer | Ian McClure; Martin McHugh; Mark McPeak; Graham McKee | (Wales) Sion Jones; Mark Harding; Andrew Fleming; David Axon | (Israel) Yair Bekier; Allan Saitowitz; Roy Ben-Ari; Colin Silberstein |
| Women's Singles | Catherine McMillen | (England) Natalie Melmore | (Scotland) Claire Johnston | (Jersey) Christine Grimes |
| Women's Pairs | (Scotland) Claire Johnston; Margaret Letham | (South Africa) Tracy-Lee Botha; Colleen Piketh | (United States) Dee McSparran; Janice Bell | (Spain) Peta Rhodes; Yvonne Briden |
| Women's Triples | (Scotland) Anne Dunwoodie; Mandy O'Donnell; Lorna Smith | (England) Julie Saunders; Natalie Melmore; Ellen Falkner | (South Africa) Helen Grundlingh; Santjie Steyn; Susan Nel | (Spain) Debbie Colquhoun; Janet Dando; Sheri Fletcher |
| Women's Fours | (England) Julie Saunders; Sian Gordon; Ellen Falkner; Amy Gowshall | (South Africa) Helen Grundlingh; Santjie Steyn; Susan Nel; Colleen Piketh | Ashleigh Rainey; Paula Montgomery; Erin Smith; Sarah-Jane Coleman | (United States) Margi Rambo; Janice Bell |

== 2015 Paphos, Cyprus ==
Athena Beach Hotel, 30 November - 13 December

| Event | Gold | Silver | Bronze | Bronze |
|---|---|---|---|---|
| Men's Singles | (England) Jamie Walker | (Scotland) Darren Burnett | (Guernsey) Todd Priaulx | Gary Kelly |
| Men's Pairs | Gary Kelly; Ian McClure | (Scotland) Paul Foster; Alex Marshall | (England) Louis Ridout; Graham Shadwell | (Israel) Daniel Alonim; Tzvika Hadar |
| Men's Triples | (Scotland) Stewart Anderson; Neil Speirs; Darren Burnett | (Wales) Paul Taylor; Steve Harris; Robert Weale | (England) Andrew Knapper; Jamie Walker; Robert Newman | Aaron Tennant; Neil Mulholland; Martin McHugh |
| Men's Fours | (Jersey) Greg Davis; Scott Ruderham; Cyril Renouf; Gus Hodgetts | (Scotland) Stewart Anderson; Neil Speirs; Paul Foster; Alex Marshall | (Wales) Ross Owen; Paul Taylor; Kevin James; Steve Harris | Aaron Tennant; Neil Mulholland; Ian McClure; Martin McHugh |
| Women's Singles | Catherine Beattie | (Netherlands) Saskia Schaft | (England) Sophie Tolchard | (Guernsey) Lucy Beere |
| Women's Pairs | (South Africa) Nici Neal; Colleen Piketh | (Cyprus) Fran Davis; Linda Ryan | (England) Rebecca Wigfield; Wendy King | (Scotland) Rebecca Craig; Claire Johnston |
| Women's Triples | Erin Smith; Bernie O'Neill; Sandra Bailie | (England) Jamie-Lea Winch; Sophie Tolchard; Ellen Falkner | (Scotland) Lorraine Malloy; Stacey McDougall; Lorna Smith | (South Africa) Sylvia Burns; Anneke Snyman; Susan Nel |
| Women's Fours | (Scotland) Rebecca Craig; Lorraine Malloy; Stacey McDougall; Claire Johnston | (Wales) Laura Daniels; Jess Sims; Kathy Pearce; Anwen Butten | (South Africa) Anneke Snyman; Sylvia Burns; Nici Neal; Susan Nel | (England) Rebecca Wigfield; Jamie-Lea Winch; Wendy King; Ellen Falkner |

== 2019 Cardiff, Wales ==
Barry Athletic BC, Dinas Powys BC, Penarth Windsor BC, Penylan BC, 10–23 May

| Event | Gold | Silver | Bronze | Bronze |
|---|---|---|---|---|
| Men's Singles | (England) Jamie Walker | (Scotland) Darren Burnett | (Wales) Daniel Salmon | Adam McKeown |
| Men's Pairs | (England) Steven Mitchinson; Jamie Walker | (Scotland) Paul Foster; Alex Marshall | (Jersey) Derek Boswell; Ross Davis | (Malta) Mark Malogorski; Brendan Aquilina |
| Men's Triples | (South Africa) Prince Neluonde; Jason Evans; Billy Radloff | (Scotland) Ronnie Duncan; Derek Oliver; Darren Burnett | (England) David Bolt; Ian Lesley; Sam Tolchard | (Namibia) Piet Appollis; Johan Jacobs; Willem Esterhuizen |
| Men's Fours | (Scotland) Ronnie Duncan; Derek Oliver; Paul Foster; Alex Marshall | (Jersey) Derek Boswell; Scott Ruderham; Greg Davis; Malcolm De Sousa | (Wales) Ben Thomas; Ross Owen; Steve Harris; Jonathan Tomlinson | Aaron Tennant; Neil Mulholland; Andrew Kyle; Mark Wilson |
| Women's Singles | (Israel) Ruthie Gilor | (Guernsey) Lucy Beere | (England) Natalie Chestney | (Scotland) Caroline Brown |
| Women's Pairs | (South Africa) Nici Neal; Colleen Piketh | (Guernsey) Rose Ogier; Lucy Beere | (Wales) Sara Nicholls; Ysie White | (England) Rebecca Wigfield; Natalie Chestney |
| Women's Triples | (England) Jamie-Lea Winch; Lorraine Kuhler; Sian Honnor | (Scotland) Hannah Smith; Claire Johnston; Caroline Brown | (South Africa) Jacqui Janse van Rensburg; Esme Kruger; Anneke Snyman | Ashleigh Rainey; Courtney Wright; Shauna O'Neill |
| Women's Fours | (Wales) Melanie Thomas; Bethan Russ; Ysie White; Anwen Butten | (South Africa) Jacqui Janse van Rensburg; Nici Neal; Esme Kruger; Anneke Snyman | (Scotland) Hannah Smith; Stacey McDougall; Megan Grantham; Claire Johnston | (Zimbabwe) Allyson Dale; Melanie James; Heather Singleton; Kerry Craven |

== See also ==
World Bowls Events
