= Jo Edwards =

New Zealand lawn bowler (born 1970)

Jo Edwards MNZM
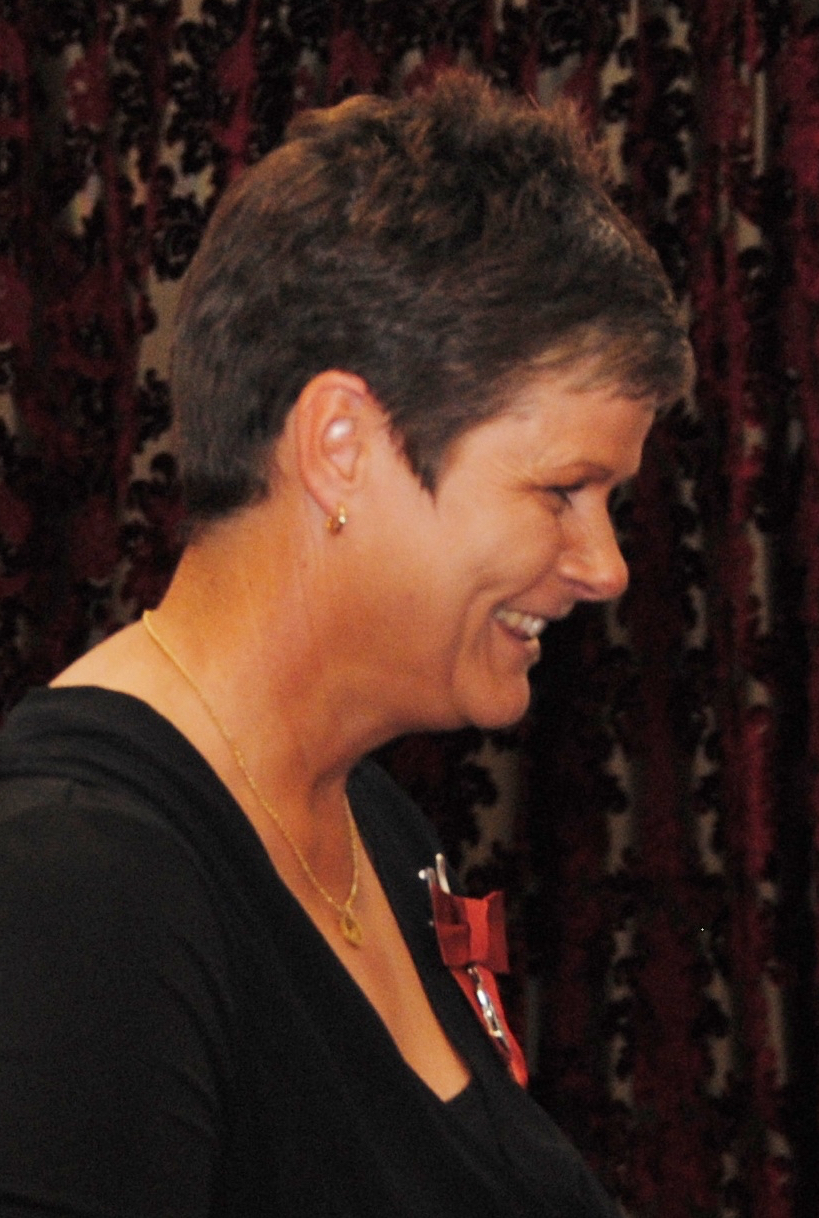
- Edwards in 2014

Personal information
- Nationality: New Zealander
- Born: 5 February 1970 (age 56) Clatterbridge, England
Medal record
Lawn bowls
Representing New Zealand
World Outdoor Championships
Gold medal – first place	2004 Leamington Spa	Pairs
Gold medal – first place	2008 Christchurch	Pairs
Silver medal – second place	2008 Christchurch	Team
Silver medal – second place	2012 Adelaide	Pairs
Silver medal – second place	2012 Adelaide	Team
Silver medal – second place	2016 Christchurch	Pairs
Bronze medal – third place	2016 Christchurch	Singles
Bronze medal – third place	2016 Christchurch	Team
Commonwealth Games
Gold medal – first place	2002 Manchester	Pairs
Gold medal – first place	2014 Glasgow	Singles
Gold medal – first place	2018 Gold Coast	Singles
Asia Pacific Bowls Championships
Gold medal – first place	2001 Melbourne	pairs
Silver medal – second place	2001 Melbourne	fours
Gold medal – first place	2003 Brisbane	fours
Bronze medal – third place	2005 Melbourne	singles
Gold medal – first place	2011 Adelaide	pairs
Gold medal – first place	2011 Adelaide	fours
Bronze medal – third place	2015 Christchurch	singles
Gold medal – first place	2019 Gold Coast	singles
Bronze medal – third place	2019 Gold Coast	pairs

Joanna Edwards MNZM (born 5 February 1970) is a New Zealand former international lawn bowls competitor. She has won two world titles and three Commonwealth Games gold medals.

== Bowls career ==
=== Outdoors ===
At the 2002 Commonwealth Games she won a gold medal along with Sharon Sims in the women's pairs event. She has twice won the gold medal at the World Outdoor Bowls Championships in the pairs events: in 2004 with Sharon Sims; and in 2008 with Val Smith.

In 2014 she won a second Commonwealth Games gold medal after winning the women's singles in Glasgow.

In 2016, she won a bronze medal at the 2016 World Outdoor Bowls Championship in Christchurch in the singles and a silver medal with Angela Boyd in the pairs.

She was selected as part of the New Zealand team for the 2018 Commonwealth Games on the Gold Coast in Queensland, where she claimed a gold medal in the Singles.

In 2020 she was selected for the 2020 World Outdoor Bowls Championship in Australia.

In addition to World Bowls and Commonwealth Games success she has won five gold medals and (nine medals in total) at the Asia Pacific Bowls Championships and excelled at the 2015 APL (Australian Premier League), she was the only woman competing in the eight-team tournament featuring 24 of the world's top players and played alongside her countrymen Ali Forsyth and Shannon McIlroy to win the title at Club Pine Rivers.

=== Indoors ===
Edwards has won six World Cup Singles titles (a women's record) with the latest success being in 2019. Previous wins were in 2009, 2010, 2011, 2013 and 2017.

== Honours ==
In the 2014 Queen's Birthday Honours, Edwards was appointed a Member of the New Zealand Order of Merit, for services to lawn bowls.

== Retirement ==
Edwards announced her retirement from international bowls in November 2020.
