= Mariana Goddard =

Former Swaziland lawn bowler

Personal information
- Nationality: Swati / South African
- Born: 2 July 1948 (age 77)
Medal record
Representing (Eswatini)
Atlantic Bowls Championships
Silver medal – second place	1999 Cape Town	triples

Mariana Goddard (born 1948) is a South African born, former Swaziland international lawn bowler.

== Bowls career ==
Goddard has represented Swaziland at three Commonwealth Games at the 1986 Commonwealth Games, the 1990 Commonwealth Games and the 1994 Commonwealth Games.

She won a triples silver medal at the 1999 Atlantic Bowls Championships in Cape Town, South Africa.
