= John Bezear =

Canadian international lawn bowler

Personal information
- Nationality: Canadian
- Born: 28 August 1979 (age 46)

Sport
- Sport: Lawn bowls
- Club: Heritage LBC
Medal record
Men's lawn bowls
Representing Canada
World Outdoor Championships
| Bronze medal – third place | 2012 Adelaide | pairs |
| Bronze medal – third place | 2023 Gold Coast | pairs |

John Bezear (born 28 August 1979) is a Canadian international lawn bowler.

== Bowls career ==
He was selected to represent Canada at the sports blue riband event, the 2012 World Outdoor Bowls Championship in Adelaide and won a bronze medal in the Men's pairs. In 2020, he was selected for the 2020 World Outdoor Bowls Championship in Australia but the event was cancelled due to the COVID-19 pandemic.

In 2022, he competed in the men's pairs and the men's fours at the 2022 Commonwealth Games.

In 2023, he was selected again by Canada for the 2023 World Outdoor Bowls Championship. He participated in the men's pairs and the men's fours events. In the pairs, Bezear qualified in first place in his group before being eliminated at the semi final stage, after losing to Ireland.
