= Sunil Bahadur =

Indian lawn bowler

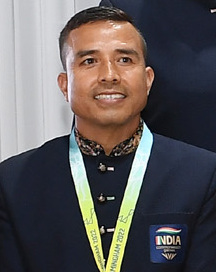
- Bahadur in August 2022

Personal information
- Nationality: Indian
- Born: 15 November 1976 (age 49) Ranchi, Jharkhand, India

Achievements and titles
- Highest world ranking: 49 (August 2026)
Medal record
Representing India
Commonwealth Games
Silver medal – second place	2022 Birmingham	fours
Asia Pacific Bowls Championships
Bronze medal – third place	2019 Gold Coast	triples
Asian Lawn Bowls Championship
Gold medal – first place	2024 Pattaya	fours

Sunil Bahadur (born 1976) is an Indian international lawn bowler. He reached a career high ranking of world number 49 in August 2026.

== Bowls career ==
=== Commonwealth Games ===
Bahadur has represented India at three Commonwealth Games in the pairs at the 2010 Commonwealth Games, the singles and triples at the 2014 Commonwealth Games and in the triples and fours at the 2018 Commonwealth Games. In the men's fours the team won section B but failed to win a medal after losing to Wales in the quarter-finals. In 2022, he competed in the men's pairs and the men's fours at the 2022 Commonwealth Games. In the fours event as part of the team with Navneet Singh, Chandan Kumar Singh and Dinesh Kumar he reached the final and secured a silver medal.

=== World Championships ===
He competed for India at the 2016 World Outdoor Bowls Championship in New Zealand. In 2020, he was selected for the 2020 World Outdoor Bowls Championship in Australia, which resulted in cancellation following the COVID-19 pandemic. He was selected by the Indian national team, to represent them at the sport's blue riband event, the 2023 World Bowls Championship. He participated in the men's pairs and the men's fours events. In the pairs with Putul Sonowal, they reached the quarter finals before losing to Canada.

=== Other events ===
Bahadur won a triples bronze medal at the 2019 Asia Pacific Bowls Championships in the Gold Coast, Queensland.

Bahadur won the gold medal in the fours at the 15th Asian Lawn Bowls Championship, held in Pattaya, Thailand, during March 2024.
