= Jamie MacDonald (bowls) =

Jersey bowls player

Personal information
- Nationality: British (Jersey)
- Born: 16 November 1987 (age 38) Jersey

Sport
- Sport: Lawn bowls
Medal record
Representing Jersey
Atlantic Bowls Championships
Bronze medal – third place	2007 Ayr	singles

Jamie MacDonald (born 16 November 1987) is an international lawn bowler from Jersey.

== Bowls career ==
MacDonald represented Jersey at the 2014 Commonwealth Games in the triples and fours.

In 2007 he won the singles bronze medal at the Atlantic Bowls Championships.
