= Dawn Squires =

Personal information
- Nationality: Swati / English
- Born: 6 June 1949 (age 77)
Medal record
Representing (Eswatini)
Atlantic Bowls Championships
Silver medal – second place	1999 Cape Town	triples

Dawn Squires (born 1949) is an English born, former Swaziland international lawn bowler.

== Bowls career ==
Squires has represented Swaziland at two Commonwealth Games; at the 1998 Commonwealth Games and the 2006 Commonwealth Games.

She won a triples silver medal at the 1999 Atlantic Bowls Championships in Cape Town, South Africa.

== Personal life ==
She lived in Malkerns and is a company Director by trade.
