= Caroline Brown (bowls) =

Scottish bowls player

Personal information
- Born: 27 August 1980 (age 45) Bellshill, North Lanarkshire, Scotland

Sport
- Sport: Bowls
- Club: Motherwell BC (outdoors); Blantyre Miners Welfare (indoors)

Achievements and titles
- Highest world ranking: 35 (August 2024)
Medal record
Women's bowls
Representing Scotland
World Outdoor Championships
Gold medal – first place	2012 Adelaide	fours
Bronze medal – third place	2012 Adelaide	triples
Bronze medal – third place	2012 Adelaide	team
Bronze medal – third place	2023 Gold Coast	fours
Commonwealth Games
Silver medal – second place	2018 Gold Coast	triples
World Indoor Bowls Championships
Gold medal – first place	2007 Yarmouth	singles
Atlantic Bowls Championships
Gold medal – first place	2009 Johannesburg	pairs
Silver medal – second place	2019 Cardiff	triples
Bronze medal – third place	2019 Cardiff	singles
World Cup Singles
Gold medal – first place	2014 Warilla	singles
British Isles Championships
Gold medal – first place	2011	singles

Caroline Brown (born 27 August 1980) is a Scottish international indoor and lawn and indoor bowls player.

== Bowls career ==
Brown was born in Bellshill, North Lanarkshire on 27 August 1980.

She won the 2007 World Indoor Bowls Championship women's singles and five years later who won a gold and bronze medal at the 2012 World Outdoor Bowls Championship.

In 2009, she won the pairs gold medal at the Atlantic Bowls Championships.

After winning the 2010 Scottish National Bowls Championships she subsequently won the singles at the British Isles Bowls Championships in 2011.

She won the gold medal at the 2014 World Cup Singles in Warilla, New South Wales, Australia.

In 2018, she was selected as part of the Scottish team for the 2018 Commonwealth Games on the Gold Coast in Queensland that won a silver medal in the Triples with Kay Moran and Stacey McDougall. In 2019 she won the triples silver medal and singles bronze medal at the Atlantic Bowls Championships.

In 2022, she competed in the women's triples and the Women's fours at the 2022 Commonwealth Games. In 2023, she was selected as part of the team to represent Scotland at the 2023 World Outdoor Bowls Championship. She participated in the women's triples and the women's fours events. In the fours, her team won the bronze medal.

== Personal life ==
Brown works as a Senior Improvement Officer for NHS Lanarkshire.
