= Stacey McDougall =

Scottish bowls player

Personal information
- Nationality: British (Scottish)
- Born: 10 April 1990 (age 36) Edinburgh

Sport
- Sport: Lawn & indoor bowls
- Club: Dalkeith BC (Outdoor); Midlothian (Indoor)
Medal record
Representing Scotland
World Outdoor Championships
| Bronze medal – third place | 2023 Gold Coast | fours |
Commonwealth Games
| Silver medal – second place | 2018 Gold Coast | Triples |
Atlantic Bowls Championships
| Gold medal – first place | 2015 Paphos | fours |
| Bronze medal – third place | 2015 Paphos | triples |
| Bronze medal – third place | 2019 Cardiff | fours |

Stacey McDougall (born 10 April 1990) is a Scottish international lawn and Indoor bowler.

== Profile ==
McDougall lives in Woodburn, Dalkeith and plays for the Dalkeith BC (Outdoor) and Midlothian BC (Indoor). She started bowling in 1999 and works for the Royal Bank of Scotland.

== Bowls career ==
McDougall made her senior international debut in 2012 (indoors) and 2013 (outdoors) and has won two senior National titles. In 2015 she won the fours gold medal at the Atlantic Bowls Championships and represented Scotland at the 2016 World Outdoor Bowls Championship – Women's Fours.

She was selected as part of the Scottish team for the 2018 Commonwealth Games, on the Gold Coast in Queensland that won a silver medal in the Triples with Kay Moran and Caroline Brown.

In 2019, she won the fours bronze medal at the Atlantic Bowls Championships and in 2020, she was selected for the 2020 World Outdoor Bowls Championship in Australia but the event was cancelled due to the COVID-19 pandemic.

In 2023, she was selected as part of the team to represent Scotland at the 2023 World Outdoor Bowls Championship. She participated in the women's triples and the women's fours events. In the fours, her team won the bronze medal.
