= Dinesh Kumar (bowls) =

Indian lawn bowler (born 1977)

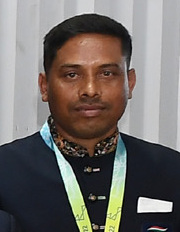
- Kumar in 2022

Personal information
- Full name: Dinesh Kumar Singh
- Born: 16 June 1977 (age 49) Ranchi, Jharkhand, India

Achievements and titles
- Highest world ranking: 10 (August 2026)
Medal record
Men's lawn bowls
Representing India
Commonwealth Games
Silver medal – second place	2022 Birmingham	Fours
World Cup
Silver medal – second place	2025 Kuala Lumpur	Singles
Asia Pacific Championships
Bronze medal – third place	2019 Gold Coast	Triples

Dinesh Kumar Singh (born 6 June 1977) is an Indian lawn bowler. He reached a career high ranking of world number 10 in August 2026.

== Bowls career ==
Kumar has represented India at three Commonwealth Games in the triples at the 2010 Commonwealth Games, the pairs and fours at the 2014 Commonwealth Games and in the triples and fours at the 2018 Commonwealth Games. In the 2014 men's fours the team topped their section but lost the bronze medal play off to Australia. Four years later the men's fours team won section B but failed to win a medal after losing to Wales in the quarter-finals. In 2022, he competed in the men's pairs and the men's fours at the 2022 Commonwealth Games. In the fours event as part of the team with Navneet Singh, Chandan Kumar Singh and Sunil Bahadur he reached the final and secured a silver medal.

Kumar won a triples bronze medal at the 2019 Asia Pacific Bowls Championships in the Gold Coast, Queensland.

In 2020, he was selected for the 2020 World Outdoor Bowls Championship in Australia, which resulted in cancellation following the COVID-19 pandemic. In 2023, he was selected by the Indian national team, to represent them at the sport's blue riband event, the 2023 World Bowls Championship. He participated in the men's triples and the men's fours events.

In November 2025, he won the singles silver medal at the 2025 Bowls World Cup, losing to Sam Tolchard in the final.
