= Erin Smith (bowls) =

Northern Irish international lawn and indoor bowler

Personal information
- Nationality: Northern Irish

Sport
- Sport: Lawn & indoor bowls
Medal record
Representing combined Ireland
Atlantic Bowls Championships
Bronze medal – third place	2011 Paphos	fours
Gold medal – first place	2015 Paphos	triples

Erin Smith is a Northern Irish international lawn & indoor bowler.

== Bowls career ==
In 2011, she won the fours bronze medal at the Atlantic Bowls Championships and in 2015 she won the triples gold medal at the Atlantic Bowls Championships.

In 2016, Smith won the finals in both the triples and fours of the Provincial Towns Women's Bowling Association Championships.

She was selected as part of the Northern Ireland team for the 2018 Commonwealth Games on the Gold Coast in Queensland.
