= Martyn Rice =

Scottish international lawn bowler (born 1986)

Personal information
- Nationality: British (Scottish)
- Born: c.1986

Sport
- Sport: Lawn and indoor bowls
- Club: Marchmount BC
Medal record
Representing Scotland
Atlantic Bowls Championships
Gold medal – first place	2011 Paphos	fours
Silver medal – second place	2011 Paphos	triples

Martyn Rice (born c.1986) is a Scottish international lawn bowler.

== Biography ==
Rice won the fours gold medal and triples silver medal at the 2011 Atlantic Bowls Championships.

Bowling for Dumfries Bowling Club, he became a Scottish national champion in 2017 after winning the singles at the Scottish National Bowls Championships. He also reached the final in 2019.
