= Tami Kamzel =

Israeli international lawn bowler

Personal information
- Native name: תמי קמזל
- Nationality: Israeli
Medal record
Representing (Israel)
Atlantic Bowls Championships
Silver medal – second place	2005 Bangor	triples
European Championships
Bronze medal – third place	2011 Portugal	mixed

Tami Kamzel (Hebrew: תמי קמזל) is an Israeli international lawn bowler.

== Bowls career ==
Kamzel won a triples silver medal (with Irit Grenchel and Naomi Fix), at the 2005 Atlantic Bowls Championships. In 2011, she won a bronze medal at the European Bowls Championships in Portugal.

Kamzel was selected as part of the five woman team by Israel for the 2020 World Outdoor Bowls Championship Previously she had represented Israel at four more World Championships; the 2000 World Outdoor Bowls Championship, the 2004 World Outdoor Bowls Championship, the 2012 World Outdoor Bowls Championship and the 2016 World Outdoor Bowls Championship.
