= Cyril Renouf =

British lawn bowler

Personal information
- Nationality: British (Jersey)

Sport
- Sport: Lawn bowls
- Club: Jersey BC
Medal record
Representing Jersey
Atlantic Bowls Championships
Silver medal – second place	2007 Ayr	pairs
Silver medal – second place	2007 Ayr	fours
Bronze medal – third place	2009 Johannesburg	fours
Gold medal – first place	2015 Paphos	fours
British Isles Championships
Gold medal – first place	2008	triples
European Championships
Gold medal – first place	2009 Cyprus	overall
Gold medal – first place	2009 Cyprus	singles
Silver medal – second place	2015 Israel	pairs

Cyril Renouf is an international lawn bowler from Jersey.

== Bowls career ==
Renouf finished first in the individual standings at the 2009 European Team Championships and represented Jersey at the 2010 Commonwealth Games.

In 2007 he won the pairs and fours silver medals at the Atlantic Bowls Championships. Two years later in 2009 he won the fours bronze medal at the Atlantic Championships and in 2015 he won the fours gold medal at the Atlantic Bowls Championships.

Renouf became a British champion after winning the 2008 triples title, at the British Isles Bowls Championships, with Alan Shaw and John Rowcliffe.

In 2015, he won his third European Bowls Championships medal in Israel.
