= Derek Boswell =

Jersey lawn bowler

Personal information
- Nationality: British (Jersey / Scottish)
- Born: 16 February 1962 (age 64) Inchinnan, Renfrewshire

Sport
- Sport: Lawn bowls
- Club: Jersey BC
Medal record
Representing Jersey
Atlantic Bowls Championships
Silver medal – second place	2007 Ayr	pairs
Silver medal – second place	2007 Ayr	fours
Bronze medal – third place	2009 Johannesburg	fours
Silver medal – second place	2019 Cardiff	fours
Bronze medal – third place	2019 Cardiff	pairs
European Championships
Silver medal – second place	2015 Israel	pairs

Derek Alexander Boswell (born 16 February 1962) is a Scottish born international lawn bowler from Jersey.

== Bowls career ==
Boswell represented Jersey at the 2006 Commonwealth Games, 2010 Commonwealth Games and the 2018 Commonwealth Games

In 2007 he won the pairs and fours silver medals at the Atlantic Bowls Championships. Two years later he won the fours bronze medal at the 2009 Atlantic Championships and in 2019 he won the fours silver medal and pairs bronze medal at the Atlantic Championships.

In 2020, he was selected for the 2020 World Outdoor Bowls Championship in Australia and in October 2021, he was selected to represent Jersey in the 2022 Commonwealth Games being held in Birmingham. He duly competed in the men's pairs and the men's fours at the Games.

In 2023, he was selected as part of the team to represent Jersey at the 2023 World Outdoor Bowls Championship. He participated in the men's pairs and the men's fours events.
