= Liz Cole (lawn bowler) =

Personal information
- Nationality: British (Jersey)
Medal record
Representing Jersey
Atlantic Bowls Championships
Gold medal – first place	2007 Ayr	fours

Liz Cole is an international lawn bowler representing Jersey.

== Bowls career ==
Cole has represented Jersey at the Commonwealth Games in the fours at the 2002 Commonwealth Games. The four finished second in their section before losing in the quarter-finals against Canada.

In 2007 she won the fours gold medal at the Atlantic Bowls Championships.
