= Linda Ryan (bowls) =

Cypriot lawn bowler

Personal information
- Nationality: Cypriot
Medal record
Representing (Cyprus)
Atlantic Bowls Championships
Silver medal – second place	2015 Cyprus	pairs
European Championships
Silver medal – second place	2009 Cyprus	singles
Bronze medal – third place	2017 Jersey	pairs

Linda Ryan is a Cypriot international lawn bowler who has won 19 titles at the Cypriot National Championships.

== Bowls career ==
In 2009, she won a medal at the European Bowls Championships. She won a pairs silver medal with Fran Davis, at the 2015 Atlantic Bowls Championships held in her home country.

Ryan was selected as part of the two woman team by Cyprus for the 2016 World Outdoor Bowls Championship, which was held in Avonhead, Christchurch, New Zealand. In 2017, she won her second European Championships medal.
