= Rebecca Craig =

Personal information
- Nationality: Scottish

Sport
- Sport: Lawn and indoor bowls
- Club: Alloa East End BC (outdoors)
Medal record
Representing Scotland
Atlantic Bowls Championships
Gold medal – first place	2015 Paphos	fours
Bronze medal – third place	2015 Paphos	pairs

Rebecca Craig is a Scottish international lawn and indoor bowler.

== Bowls career ==
In 2015 she won the fours gold medal and the pairs bronze medal at the Atlantic Bowls Championships.

She is also an indoor Scottish national champion.
