= Julie Saunders =

Julie Saunders Julie Leake
Personal information
- Nationality: British (English)
- Born: 1962 (age 63–64) Corfe Mullen, Dorset, England

Sport
- Sport: Lawn bowls
- Club: Bournemouth IBC (indoors); Poole Park (outdoors)
Medal record
Representing England
Atlantic Bowls Championships
Gold medal – first place	2011 Paphos	fours
Silver medal – second place	2011 Paphos	triples
English Nationals
Gold medal – first place	2005	singles 4 wood
Gold medal – first place	2022	champion of champions
Gold medal – first place	2026	fours

Julie Saunders married name Julie Leake, is an English female international lawn and indoor bowler.

== Bowls career ==
Saunders won the English National title in 2005 representing Hampshire. By winning the National title she represented England at the 2006 World Singles Champion of Champions event in Christchurch, New Zealand where she won the gold medal defeating Julie Keegan in the final.

In 2011 she won the fours gold medal and the triples silver medal at the Atlantic Bowls Championships. In 2022, she won the champion of champions title at the 2022 Bowls England National Finals.

== Personal life ==
Saunders is a sports coach at Bryanston School, near Blandford Forum and married fellow bowler Roy Leake (a former fours National finalist) in Las Vegas during 2012.
