= Steven Mitchinson =

British lawn bowler

Personal information
- Nationality: British (English)
- Born: 6 August 1975 (age 51)

Sport
- Sport: Bowls
- Club: Kings Chase BC & Barking IBC
Medal record
Representing England
Atlantic Bowls Championships
Gold medal – first place	2019 Cardiff	pairs

Steven John Mitchinson (born 6 August 1975) is an English international bowls player.

== Career ==
Mitchinson started off his bowls career playing for Tye Green Bowls Club before moving to Nortel Bowls Club. In 2000, he moved to his current club, Romford Bowls Club.

He won the National Championship Singles in 2010 and consequently qualified for the 2011 British Isles Bowls Championships, where he finished runner-up to Richard Leonard. The same year, he made his debut for England in the 2011 British Isles Series held in Edinburgh, where England finished third. In 2012, he was picked as reserve for the England team and was victorious in Dublin the following year. He was selected in the English teams from 2014 to 2019, the England side won the British Isles Series in 2015, 2016 and 2017.

In 2013, he was called up for the English Indoor side but the England team was unsuccessful in the British Isles Series which was won by Scotland, however subsequent years were more successful and he was a member of the England team which won the Series in both 2014 and 2015. In November 2011 he competed in the World Singles Champion of Champions finishing fifth. He was ranked 20th in the world according to the World Bowls Ranking list. In November 2015 he won the Harlow Sports Personality award and was a finalist for the Essex Sports Personality of the year award. In 2017 he was captain of the Essex team that won the Balcomb (National Double Rink) Trophy.

In 2019, he was selected for the England squad, with Sam Tolchard, Jamie Walker, Ian Lesley and David Bolt at the Atlantic Bowls Championships which were held in Cardiff, Wales. He won the pairs competition (partnering Walker) after winning their group, defeating Malta in the semi-final and Scotland in the final. In the final they won by one shot beating Paul Foster and Alex Marshall.

== See also ==
- English National Bowls Championships
