= Joan Renouf =

British lawn bowler (b.1944)

Personal information
- Nationality: British (Jersey)
- Born: 1 March 1944 Jersey, Channel Islands
- Died: June 11, 2025 (aged 81) Jersey, Channel Islands
Medal record
Representing Jersey
Atlantic Bowls Championships
Gold medal – first place	2007 Ayr	fours
European Championships
Gold medal – first place	2011 Portugal	pairs
Bronze medal – third place	2013 Spain	pairs

Joan Madeline Renouf (1 March 1944 – 11 June 2025) was an international lawn bowler representing Jersey.

== Bowls career ==
Renouf represented Jersey at two Commonwealth Games; in the triples at the 2010 Commonwealth Games and the triples and fours at the 2018 Commonwealth Games.

In 2007, she won the fours gold medal at the Atlantic Bowls Championships.

In 2011, she won a gold medal at the European Bowls Championships in Portugal and two years later in 2013, won a bronze at the same Championships.
