= Ruthie Gilor =

Israeli lawn bowler

Personal information
- Native name: רותי גילור
- Nationality: Israeli
- Born: 1965

Sport
- Club: Kiryat Ono BC
Medal record
Representing (Israel)
Atlantic Bowls Championships
Silver medal – second place	2007 Ayr	singles
Bronze medal – third place	2007 Ayr	pairs
Gold medal – first place	2009 Johannesburg	singles
Gold medal – first place	2019 Cardiff	singles
European Championships
Bronze medal – third place	2011 Portugal	mixed
Bronze medal – third place	2022 Ayr	triples

Ruthie Gilor (Hebrew: רותי גילור) also known as is a lawn and indoor international bowler.

== Bowls career ==
Gilor represented Israel during the 2000 World Outdoor Bowls Championship and 2004 World Outdoor Bowls Championship (in which she reached the singles quarter final) and the 2012 World Outdoor Bowls Championship. In 2005 she became the first person to reach all four disciplines in the Israeli National championships and successfully defended her singles crown winning of the third time.

In 2007, she won the singles silver medal and bronze pairs medal at the Atlantic Bowls Championships.

In 2009, she won the singles gold medal at the Atlantic Bowls Championships In 2011, she won a bronze medal at the European Bowls Championships in Portugal.

In 2019, ten years after her last Atlantic medal she won the singles gold again at the 2019 Atlantic Bowls Championships. In 2020, was selected for the 2020 World Outdoor Bowls Championship but the event was cancelled due to the COVID-19 pandemic. In 2022, she won singles bronze at the European Bowls Championships.

In 2023, she was selected as part of the team to represent Israel at the 2023 World Outdoor Bowls Championship. She participated in the women's singles and the women's triples events.
