= Fran Davis =

Cypriot lawn bowler

Personal information
- Nationality: Cypriot
Medal record
Representing (Cyprus)
Atlantic Bowls Championships
Silver medal – second place	2015 Cyprus	pairs

Fran Davis is a Cypriot international lawn bowler.

== Bowls career ==
Davis was selected as part of the two woman team by Cyprus for the 2016 World Outdoor Bowls Championship, which was held in Avonhead, Christchurch, New Zealand.

She won a pairs silver medal with Linda Ryan, at the 2015 Atlantic Bowls Championships held in her home country and she has won nine titles at the Cypriot National Championships.
