= Asian Lawn Bowls Championship =

International lawn bowling competition

Tournament information
- Sport: Lawn bowls
- Location: Various
- Established: 2001
- Administrator: World Bowls

The Asian Lawn Bowls Championship is a lawn bowls competition held between national bowls organisations in Asia.

== Past winners ==
=== Men ===
Year	Venue	Singles	Pairs	Triples	Fours	Ref
2001	Hong Kong; 17–23 Jun	Malaysia	(Hong Kong); Adam Poynton; James Cheng	Philippines	Malaysia	
2002	Angeles City; Philippines; 6–12 May		Malaysia			
2003	Kuala Lumpur; Malaysia; 7–12 Jul	(Hong Kong); Adam Poynton	(Malaysia); Jozaini Johari; Safuan Said	(Malaysia); Azizan Saidon; Zuraidi Puteh; Mohamad Syed Akil	(Malaysia); Zuraidi Puteh; Kamarul Aizat Othman; Mohamad Syed Akil; Jozaini Johari	
2005	Kuala Lumpur; Malaysia; 1–5 Jun	(Brunei); Haji Naim Brahim	(Malaysia); Fairul Izwan Abd Muin; Safuan Said	(Hong Kong); Dickson Ha; James Keung; Jimmy Chiu	(Malaysia); Megat Nazim Zinuddin; Fairul Izwan Abd Muin; Mohamad Syed Akil; Safuan Said	
2006	Brunei; 12–18 Aug		(Hong Kong); Jerry Ng; Robin Chok	(Brunei); Pg Md Salleh Chuchu; Lokman Hj Md Salleh		
2007	Kuala Lumpur; Malaysia; 12–20 Jul		(Brunei); Abdul Rahman bin Haji Omar; Haji Naim Brahim			
2008	Shenzhen; China; 30 Oct–7 Nov		(Brunei); Abdul Rahman bin Haji Omar			
2009	Bijiashan Park; Shenzhen; China; 2–9 Dec					
2012	Kuala Lumpur; Malaysia; 6–11 Apr	(India); Sunil Bahadur	(Philippines); Christopher Dagpin; Hommer Mercado	(Thailand); Tanongsak Klinsorn; Vinai Nilklum; Thakrit Thamasarn	(Philippines); Angelo Morales; Christopher Dagpin; Ronald Lising; Edman Portacio	
2014	Shenzhen; China; 1–9 Dec	(Hong Kong); Tony Cheung	(Hong Kong); Tony Cheung; Stanley Lai	(Malaysia); Soufi Rusli; Zulhilmie Redzuan; Syamil Syazwan Ramli	(Malaysia); Hizlee Rais; Fairul Muin; Soufi Rusli; Zulhilmie Redzuan	
2016	Brunei; 24 Jan–2 Feb	(Malaysia); Fairus Jabal	(Hong Kong); James Po; Tony Cheung	(Malaysia); Mohd Naufal Azmi; Syamil Syazwan Ramli; Mohd Amir Mohd Yusof	(India); Chandan Kumar Singh; Mridul Borgohain; Krishna Xalxo; Dinesh Kumar	
2017	New Delhi; India; 3–10 Oct	(Malaysia); Soufi Rusli	(Malaysia); Hizlee Rais; Fairul Muin	(India); Chandan Kumar Singh; Sunil Bahadur; Dinesh Kumar	(Singapore); Anthony Loh; Melvin Tan; Pang Heng Heck; Bernard Foo	
2018	Xinxiang; China; 10–17 Oct	(Thailand); Wattana Kadkhunthod	(Hong Kong); Tony Cheung; Imen Tang	(Malaysia); Zulhilmie Redzuan; Fairus Jabal; Izzat Dzulkeple	(Hong Kong); Kenny Tam; Anthony So; Imen Tang; Li Ming Sum	
2023	Kuala Lumpur; Malaysia; 20–26 Feb	(Malaysia); Izzat Dzulkeple	(Philippines); Rodel Labayo; Elmer Abatayo	(Philippines); Ronald Lising; Leo Carreon; Hommer Mercado	(Malaysia); Hizlee Rais; Amirul Daniel Abdul Rahim; Muhammad Haiqal Azami; Soufi Rusli	
2024	Pattaya; Thailand; 3–10 Mar	(Malaysia); Izzat Dzulkeple	(Philippines); Elmer Abatayo; Rodel Labayo	(Malaysia); Soufi Rusli; Idham Amin Ramlan; Fadley Jabal	(India); Abhishek Lakra; Sunil Bahadur; Chandan Kumar Singh; Alok Lakra	
2025	Clark City; Philippines; 27 Apr–4 May	(Hong Kong); James Po	(Malaysia); Soufi Rusli; Amirul Danial Abdul Rahim	(Malaysia); Muhammad Naufal Azmi; Idham Amin Ramlan; Izzat Dzulkeple	(Malaysia); Muhammad Naufal Azmi; Idham Amin Ramlan; Soufi Rusli; Amirul Danial Abdul Rahim	

=== Women ===
Year	Venue	Singles	Pairs	Triples	Fours	Ref
2001	Hong Kong; 17-23 Jun		(Singapore); Rosemary Tessensohn; Mary Lim			
2002	Angeles City; Philippines; 6-12 May				Malaysia	
2003	Kuala Lumpur; Malaysia; 7–12 Jul	(Malaysia); Siti Zalina Ahmad	(Thailand); Vivatana Itinitpong; Rosrin Sonmani	(Malaysia); Haslah Hassan; Nazura Ngahat; Saedah Abdul Rahim	(Malaysia); Azlina Arshad; Nazura Ngahat; Haslah Hassan; Nor Hashimah Ismail	
2005	Kuala Lumpur; Malaysia; 1–5 Jun	(Malaysia); Siti Zalina Ahmad	(Malaysia); Bah Chu Mei; Nor Hashimah Ismail	(Thailand); Songsin Tsao; Kornkamon Phonghanyudh; Thong Omen	(Malaysia); Nor Iryani Azmi; Azlina Arshad; Haslah Hassan; Nor Hashimah Ismail	
2006	Brunei; 12–18 Aug			(Hong Kong); Hana Ko; Winnie Wai; Peggy Ma	(Malaysia); Nor Iryani Azmi	
2007	Kuala Lumpur; Malaysia; 12–20 Jul					
2008	Shenzhen; China; 30 Oct–7 Nov	(Malaysia); Siti Zalina Ahmad	(Malaysia); Siti Zalina Ahmad			
2009	Bijiashan Park; Shenzhen; China; 2–9 Dec				(India); Manisha Kumari; Farrana Khan; Rupa Rani Tirkey; Pinki Singh	
2012	Kuala Lumpur; Malaysia; 6–11 Apr	(Malaysia); Emma Firyana Saroji	(Malaysia); Emma Firyana Saroji; Maisarah Aminludin	(Philippines); Marites Rosas; Hazel Jagonoy; Nancy Bercasio Breakenridge	(Hong Kong); Tammy Tham; Jessie So; Joanna Nam; Alice Lee	
2014	Shenzhen; China; 1–9 Dec	(Hong Kong); Dorothy Yu	(Hong Kong); Dorothy Yu; Helen Cheung	(China); Wu Feng Ping; Li Qing Xuan; Chen Yan Fen	(China); Zeng Xiao Ping; Wu Feng Ping; Li Qing Xuan; Chen Yan Fen	
2016	Brunei; 24 Jan–2 Feb	(Malaysia); Siti Zalina Ahmad	(Malaysia); Nur Ain Nabilah Tarmizi; Siti Zalina Ahmad	(Malaysia); Auni Fathiah Kamis; Zuraini Khalid; Nur Fidrah Noh	(Brunei); HJH Ajijah Muntol; Suhana Daud; HJH Amalia HJ MA Tali; Esma W Andy Brahim	
2017	New Delhi; India; 3–10 Oct	(Malaysia); Siti Zalina Ahmad	(Malaysia); Auni Fathiah Kamis; Siti Zalina Ahmad	(India); Nayanmoni Saikia; Farzana Khan; Pinki Singh	(Malaysia); Nur Ain Nabilah Tarmizi; Auni Fathiah Kamis; Zuraini Khalid; Azlina Arshad	
2018	Xinxiang; China; 10–17 Oct	(Singapore); Shermeen Lim	(Malaysia); Siti Zalina Ahmad; Emma Firyana Saroji	(China); Zheng Fang; Song Su Zhen; Miao Xin Hung	(Malaysia); Siti Zalina Ahmad; Azlina Arshad; Nur Fidrah Noh; Auni Fathiah Kamis	
2023	Kuala Lumpur; Malaysia; 20–26 Feb	(Malaysia); Alyani Jamil	(Philippines); Marissa Baronda; Rosita Bradborn	(Malaysia); Alyani Jamil; Syafiqa Haidar Afif; Azlina Arshad	(India); Nayanmoni Saikia; Rupa Rani Tirkey; Pinki Singh; Lovely Choubey	
2024	Pattaya; Thailand; 3–10 Mar	(Philippines); Rosita Bradborn	(India); Nayanmoni Saikia; Bangita Hazarika	(Philippines); Sharon Hauters; Ainie Knight; Hazel Jagonoy	(Malaysia); Aleena Nawawi; Nur Ain Nabilah Tarmizi; Syafiqa Rahman; Nor Farah Ain Abdullah	
2025	Clark City; Philippines; 27 Apr–4 May	(Malaysia); Alyani Jamil	(Malaysia); Aleena Nawawi; Nur Ain Nabilah Tarmizi	(India); Pinki Singh; Rupa Rani Tirkey; Lovely Choubey	(Philippines); Sharon Hauters; Marisa Baronda; Hazel Jagonoy; Ainie Knight	

== See also ==
- World Bowls Events
