= Lawn bowls at the 2019 SEA Games =

- Venue: Friendship Gate, Clark
- Location: Pampanga, Philippines
- Date: 1–4 December

The lawn bowls competitions at the 2019 Southeast Asian Games in Philippines were held at a lot beside the Friendship Gate of the Clark Freeport Zone from 1 to 4 December 2019. It was the sixth time that Lawn bowls at the Southeast Asian Games was held.

== Schedule ==
The following was the schedule for the lawn bowls competitions. All times were Philippine Standard Time (UTC+8).

== Medal table ==
* Host nation (Philippines)

Rank	Nation	Gold	Silver	Bronze	Total
1	Malaysia (MAS)	4	0	2	6
2	Philippines (PHI)*	1	3	2	6
3	Singapore (SGP)	1	0	1	2
4	Brunei (BRU)	0	2	0	2
5	Thailand (THA)	0	1	1	2
Totals (5 entries)		6	6	6	18

== Medalists ==
=== Men ===
Event	Gold	Silver	Bronze
Pairs	Philippines; Rodel Labayo; Angelo Morales	Thailand; Woramet Singkeaw; Uthen Ontong	Malaysia; Muhammad Hizlee Abdul Rais; Soufi Rusli
Triples	Malaysia; Izzat Dzulkeple; Fairus Jabal; Syamil Syazwan Ramli	Philippines; Elmer Abatayo; Hommer Mercado; Christopher Dagpin	Singapore; Leong Khim Hoong; Melvin Tan Kwang Yong; Matthew Ngui Ming Fook
Fours	Malaysia; Idham Amin Ramli; Daeng Dhadyry Dahasry; Zulhilmie Redzuan; Fairul Izwan Abd Muin	Brunei; Bahren Abdul Rahman; Mohd Hazmi Hj Idris; Haji Amli Haji Gafar; Haji Osman Haji Yahya	Philippines; Curte Robert Guarin; Emmanuel Portacio; Leo Carreon; Ronald Lising

=== Women ===
Event	Gold	Silver	Bronze
Pairs	Malaysia; Alyani Jamil; Emma Firyana Saroji	Brunei; Amalia Matali; Esmawandy Brahim	Philippines; Nenita Tabiano; Ronalyn Greenlees
Triples	Singapore; Lim Poh Eng; Goh Quee Kee; Shermeen Lim	Philippines; Nancy Toyco; Sonia Bruce; Ainie Knight	Malaysia; Auni Fathiah Kamis; Zuraini Khalid; Azlina Arshad
Fours	Malaysia; Afiqah Dayana Budiman; Nur Ain Nabilah Tarmizi; Syafiqa Rahman; Siti Zalina Ahmad	Philippines; Marisa Baronda; Sharon Hauters; Hazel Jagonoy; Rosita Bradborn	Thailand; Chamaiporn Kotchawong; Kanistha Langyanai; Palita Gangur; Nannapat Tomak
