= Lawn bowls at the 2022 Commonwealth Games =

- Venue: Victoria Park
- Dates: 29 July – 6 August 2022
- Competitors: 227 from 24 nations

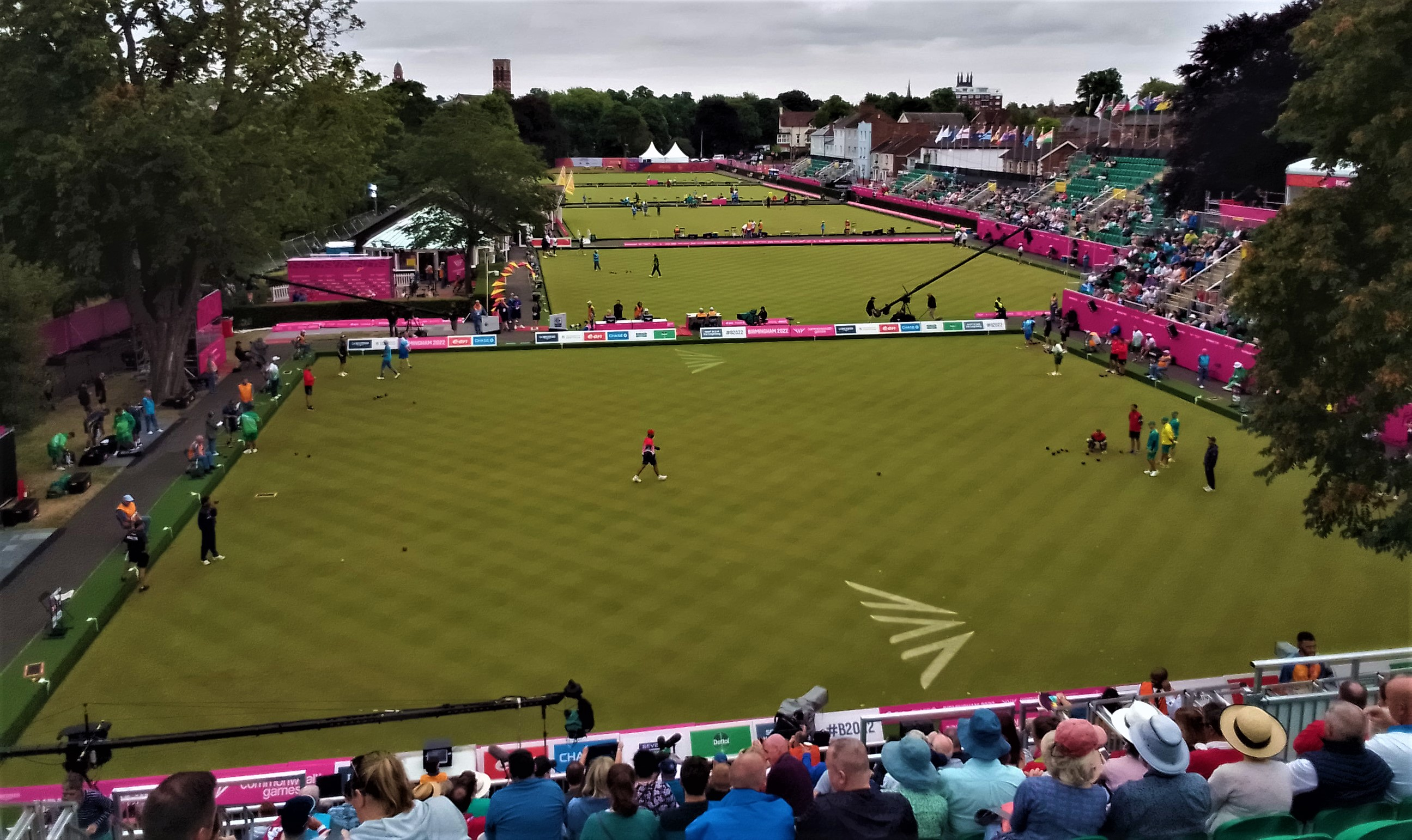
Lawn bowls competition at the 2022 Commonwealth Games

Lawn bowls at the 2022 Commonwealth Games was the 21st appearance of Lawn bowls at the Commonwealth Games. the lawn bowls competition at the 2022 Commonwealth Games was held in Birmingham, England. This was the twenty-first edition having featured in every Games bar 1966, and the third staging within England specifically.

The competition was scheduled to take place between 29 July and 6 August 2022, spread across eleven events (including three parasport events).

== Schedule ==
The competition schedule was as follows:

G	Group stage	¼	Quarter-finals	½	Semi-finals	B	Bronze medal match	F	Gold medal match

Date Event	Fri 29		Sat 30		Sun 31		Mon 1					Tue 2				Wed 3			Thu 4			Fri 5				Sat 6			
Session →	M	A	M	A	M	A	M			A		M		A		M	A		M	A		M		A		M		A	
Men's singles												G				G			G			¼				½		B	F
Men's pairs		G		G	G	¼	½					B	F																
Men's triples	G	G	G		G	¼	½	B	F																				
Men's fours														G			G			G		¼		½		B	F		
Women's singles	G		G		G	¼	½			B	F																		
Women's pairs												G				G			G			¼	½			B	F		
Women's triples												G					G			G	¼	½		B	F				
Women's fours		G		G	G	¼	½					B	F																
Parasport
Men's pairs B6–8	G		G			G	½							B	F														
Women's pairs B6–8	G		G			G	½										B	F											
Mixed pairs B2–3						G	G			G		G					G			½		B	F						

== Venue ==
The lawn bowls competition will be held at the Victoria Park bowling greens in Leamington Spa.

== Qualification (parasport) ==
A total of 36 parasport bowlers (18 pairs) nominally qualify to compete at the Games. They qualify for each event as follows:

- One pair from the host nation.
- Five pairs (one per nation, excluding the hosts) receive a CGF / International Bowls for the Disabled (IBD) Bipartite Invitation.

== Medal table ==
* Host nation (England)

Rank	Nation	Gold	Silver	Bronze	Total
1	Australia	3	3	0	6
2	Scotland	3	0	2	5
3	England*	2	2	3	7
4	Wales	1	1	1	3
5	India	1	1	0	2
5	Northern Ireland	1	1	0	2
7	Malaysia	0	1	1	2
7	South Africa	0	1	1	2
9	Guernsey	0	1	0	1
10	New Zealand	0	0	3	3
Totals (10 entries)		11	11	11	33

== Medallists ==
=== Men ===
Event	Gold	Silver	Bronze
Singles	Aaron Wilson; Australia	Gary Kelly; Northern Ireland	Iain McLean; Scotland
Pairs	Wales; Daniel Salmon; Jarrad Breen	England; Jamie Walker; Sam Tolchard	Scotland; Paul Foster; Alex Marshall
Triples	England; Louis Ridout; Nick Brett; Jamie Chestney	Australia; Barrie Lester; Carl Healey; Ben Twist	Wales; Owain Dando; Ross Owen; Jonathan Tomlinson
Fours	Northern Ireland; Sam Barkley; Adam McKeown; Ian McClure; Martin McHugh	India; Sunil Bahadur; Navneet Singh; Chandan Kumar Singh; Dinesh Kumar	England; Louis Ridout; Nick Brett; Jamie Chestney; Sam Tolchard

=== Women ===
Event	Gold	Silver	Bronze
Singles	Ellen Ryan; Australia	Lucy Beere; Guernsey	Siti Zalina Ahmad; Malaysia
Pairs	Australia; Kristina Krstic; Ellen Ryan	England; Amy Pharaoh; Sophie Tolchard	New Zealand; Katelyn Inch; Selina Goddard
Triples	England; Jamie-Lea Winch; Natalie Chestney; Sian Honnor	Malaysia; Nur Ain Nabilah Tarmizi; Syafiqa Haidar Afif Abdul Rahman; Azlina Arshad	New Zealand; Nicole Toomey; Tayla Bruce; Val Smith
Fours	India; Rupa Rani Tirkey; Nayanmoni Saikia; Lovely Choubey; Pinki Singh	South Africa; Thabelo Muvhango; Bridget Calitz; Esme Kruger; Johanna Snyman	New Zealand; Selina Goddard; Nicole Toomey; Tayla Bruce; Val Smith

=== Para-sport ===
Event	Gold	Silver	Bronze
Men's pairs B6–8	Scotland; Garry Brown; Kevin Wallace	Australia; Damien Delgado; Chris Flavel	England; Craig Bowler; Kieran Rollings
Women's pairs B6–8	Scotland; Rosemary Lenton; Pauline Wilson	Australia; Serena Bonnell; Cheryl Lindfield	South Africa; Desiree Levin; Victoria van der Merwe
Mixed pairs B2–3	Scotland; Melanie Inness; George Miller; Robert Barr; Sarah Jane Ewing	Wales; Julie Thomas; Mark Adams; Gordon LLewellyn; John Wilson	England; Alison Yearling; Susan Wherry; Chris Turnbull; Mark Wherry

== Participating nations ==
There were 24 participating Commonwealth Games Associations (CGA's) in lawn bowls with a total of 227 (118 men and 109 women) athletes. The number of athletes a nation entered is in parentheses beside the name of the country.

- Australia (18)
- Botswana (4)
- Brunei (6)
- Canada (10)
- Cook Islands (10)
- England (18)
- Falkland Islands (5)
- Fiji (10)
- Guernsey (4)
- India (10)
- Jamaica (2)
- Jersey (5)
- Kenya (2)
- Malaysia (10)
- Malta (8)
- Namibia (2)
- New Zealand (18)
- Niue (10)
- Norfolk Island (10)
- Northern Ireland (10)
- Scotland (18)
- Singapore (3)
- South Africa (18)
- Wales (16)
