= Idham Amin Ramlan =

Malaysian lawn bowler

Personal information
- Nationality: Malaysian
- Born: 13 November 2000 (age 25) Malaysia

Sport
- Sport: Lawn bowls

Achievements and titles
- Highest world ranking: 20 (November 2025)
Medal record
Representing Malaysia
World Outdoor Championships
Bronze medal – third place	2023 Gold Coast	pairs
Southeast Asian Games
Gold medal – first place	2019 Philippines	fours
Asian Lawn Bowls Championship
Gold medal – first place	2025 Clark	triples
Gold medal – first place	2025 Clark	fours

Muhammad Idham Amin Ramlan (born 13 December 2000) is a Malaysian international lawn bowler and South East Asian champion. He has represented Malaysia at the Commonwealth Games. He reached a career high ranking of world number 20 in November 2025.

== Biography ==
In 2018 he won the U-25 gold medal at the 2018 Asian Lawn Championships. In 2021, he won the gold medal at the Lawn bowls at the Southeast Asian Games in the fours event.

In 2022, he participated in the 2022 Commonwealth Games in Birmingham, where he competed in the men's pairs event and the men's fours event.

He was selected by the Malaysian national team, to represent them at the sport's blue riband event, the 2023 World Bowls Championship. He will participate in the men's pairs and the men's fours events. The Malaysian team ranked seventh in the world at the start of the tournament, were given the target of reaching the semi finals. In the pairs with Izzat Dzulkeple, they won a bronze medal.

In 2025, Ramlan won a gold medal in the triples and fours at the 16th Asian Lawn Bowls Championship in Clark City, Philippines.
