= Hazel Jagonoy =

Filipino lawn bowler

Personal information
- Nationality: Filipino
- Born: 2 October 1988 (age 37) Gamay, Northern Samar, Philippines

Sport
- Club: Angeles Sports and Country Club
Medal record
Women's lawn bowls
Representing Philippines
World Outdoor Championships
Bronze medal – third place	2016 Christchurch	fours
Asia Pacific Bowls Championships
Gold medal – first place	2015 Christchurch	triples
Southeast Asian Games
Silver medal – second place	2017 Kuala Lumpur	triples
Silver medal – second place	2019 Philippines	fours
Asian Lawn Bowls Championship
Gold medal – first place	2024 Pattaya	triples
Gold medal – first place	2025 Clark	fours

Hazel Drio Jagonoy (born 1988) is an international Philippines lawn bowler.

== Biography ==
She won a triples gold at the Asia Pacific Bowls Championships in Christchurch but came to prominence after winning a bronze medal at the 2016 World Outdoor Bowls Championship in Christchurch in the fours with Rosita Bradborn, Ronalyn Greenlees and Sonia Bruce.

In 2020 she was selected for the sport's blue riband event, the 2020 World Outdoor Bowls Championship in Australia but the event was cancelled due to the COVID-19 pandemic.

In 2023, she was selected as part of the team to represent Philippines at the 2023 World Outdoor Bowls Championship. She participated in the women's triples and the women's fours events.

Jagonoy won the gold medal in the triples at the 15th Asian Lawn Bowls Championship, held in Pattaya, Thailand, during March 2024. In 2025 she won a gold medal in the fours at the 16th Asian Lawn Bowls Championship in Clark City, Philippines.
