= Aleena Nawawi =

Malaysian lawn bowler (born 1999)

Personal information
- Full name: Aleena Ahmad Nawawi
- Nationality: Malaysian
- Born: 2 January 1999 (age 27) Perak, Malaysia

Sport
- Sport: Lawn bowls

Achievements and titles
- Highest world ranking: 11 (August 2026)
Medal record
Representing Malaysia
World Outdoor Championships
Gold medal – first place	2023 Gold Coast	pairs
Commonwealth Games
Silver medal – second place	2026 Glasgow	pairs
Asian Lawn Bowls Championship
Gold medal – first place	2024 Pattaya	fours
Gold medal – first place	2025 Clark	pairs
National Championships
Silver medal – second place	2023	singles

Aleena Ahmad Nawawi (born 2 January 1999) is a lawn bowler from Malaysia. She reached a career high ranking of world number 11 in August 2026.

== Bowls career ==
Aleena came to prominence in late 2022, winning the gold medal in the triples at the 2022 Malaysian Games and then winning a silver medal at the national singles at the Bukit Kiara Sports Complex. She lost in the final to Alyani Jamil.

Her performances led to her being selected by the Malaysian national team, to represent them at the sport's blue riband event, the 2023 World Bowls Championship. She participated in the women's pairs and the women's fours events. The Malaysian team ranked seventh in the world at the start of the tournament, were given the target of reaching the semi finals. In the pairs partnering Ain Nabilah Tarmizi, she reached the final against Malta, where she won the gold medal after winning 15–11.

Nawawi won the gold medal in the fours at the 15th Asian Lawn Bowls Championship, held in Pattaya, Thailand, during March 2024. In 2025 she won a gold medal in the pairs at the 16th Asian Lawn Bowls Championship in Clark City, Philippines.

Playing with Syafiqa Haidar, she won the silver medal in the women's pairs at the 2026 Commonwealth Games in Glasgow, Scotland, losing to England's Sian Honnor and Amy Pharaoh in the final .

== Honours ==
=== Honours of Malaysia ===
- Malaysia :
  - Member of the Order of the Defender of the Realm (AMN) (2024)
