= Lawn bowls at the 2022 Commonwealth Games – Women's triples =

Bowls event

Lawn bowls women's triples at the 2022 Commonwealth Games
- Venue: Victoria Park
- Dates: 2 – 5 August 2022
- Competitors: 51 from 17 nations

Medalists
gold medal	Jamie-Lea Winch; Natalie Chestney; Sian Honnor	England
silver medal	Nur Ain Nabilah Tarmizi; Syafiqa Haidar Afif Abdul Rahman; Azlina Arshad	Malaysia
bronze medal	Nicole Toomey; Tayla Bruce; Val Smith	New Zealand

Lawn bowls at the 2022 Commonwealth Games – Women's triples was held at the Victoria Park from 2 to 5 August. A total of 51 athletes from 17 associations participated in the event. England won the gold medal, defeating Malaysia in the final. New Zealand won the bronze medal.

== Sectional play ==
The top two triples from each section will advance to the knockout stage.

=== Section A ===
Rank	Nation	Athletes	MP	MW	MT	ML	FR	AG	PD	PTS
1	Australia	Lynsey Clarke, Natasha Van Eldik, Rebecca Van Asch	4	3	0	1	82	45	+37	9
2	Northern Ireland	Ashleigh Rainey, Courtney Meneely, Chloe Wilson	4	3	0	1	69	56	+13	9
3	South Africa	Thabelo Muvhango, Esme Kruger, Johanna Snyman	4	2	0	2	69	60	+9	6
4	Singapore	Margaret Lim, Amira Goh, Shermeen Lim	4	2	0	2	66	73	–7	6
5	Falkland Islands	Andrea Stanworth, Trudi Clarke, Daphne Arthur-Almond	4	0	0	4	42	94	–52	0

	Australia	Northern Ireland	South Africa	Singapore	Falkland Islands
Australia	—	19–9	12–17	22–11	29–8
Northern Ireland	9–19	—	15–14	23–13	22–10
South Africa	17–12	14–15	—	18–19	20–14
Singapore	11–22	13–23	19–18	—	23–10
Falkland Islands	8–29	10–22	14–20	10–23	—

=== Section B ===
Rank	Nation	Athletes	MP	MW	MT	ML	FR	AG	PD	PTS
1	Cook Islands	Emily Jim, Tiare Jim, Teokotai Jim	3	3	0	0	53	37	+16	9
2	Wales	Laura Daniels, Ysie White, Anwen Butten	3	1	1	1	43	44	-1	4
3	Scotland	Dee Hoggan, Lauren Baillie-Whyte, Caroline Brown	3	1	0	2	52	45	+7	3
4	Botswana	Lesego Mottladiile, Lephai Marea Modutlwa, Jocelyn Tshenolo Moshokgo	3	0	1	2	34	56	–22	1

	Cook Islands	Wales	Scotland	Botswana
Cook Islands	—	14–11	24–13	15–13
Wales	11–14	—	16–14	16–16
Scotland	13–24	14–16	—	25–5
Botswana	15–13	16–16	5–25	—

=== Section C ===
Rank	Nation	Athletes	MP	MW	MT	ML	FR	AG	PD	PTS
1	England	Jamie-Lea Winch, Natalie Chestney, Sian Honnor	3	2	0	1	64	41	+23	6
2	New Zealand	Nicole Toomey, Tayla Bruce, Val Smith	3	2	0	1	60	39	+21	6
3	India	Tania Choudhury, Pinki Singh, Rupa Rani Tirkey	3	2	0	1	54	42	+12	6
4	Niue	Tagaloa Tukuitoga, Liline Tagaloa Hewett, Selasiosiana Sionetamasi Simpson	3	0	0	3	29	85	–56	0

	England	New Zealand	India	Niue
England	—	14–18	24–11	26–12
New Zealand	18–14	—	11–15	31–10
India	11–24	15–11	—	28–7
Niue	12–26	10–31	7–28	—

=== Section D ===
Rank	Nation	Athletes	MP	MW	MT	ML	FR	AG	PD	PTS
1	Malaysia	Nur Ain Nabilah Tarmizi, Syafiqa Haidar Afif Abdul Rahman, Azlina Arshad	3	2	0	1	56	42	+14	6
2	Fiji	Radhika Prasad, Loreta Kotoisuva, Sheral Mar	3	2	0	1	49	40	+9	6
3	Canada	Jennifer Macdonald, Leanne Chinery, Kelly McKerihen	3	1	0	2	49	47	+2	3
4	Norfolk Island	Ellie Dixon, Petal Jones, Essie Sanchez	3	1	0	2	34	59	–25	3

	Malaysia	Fiji	Canada	Norfolk Island
Malaysia	—	14–17	18–17	24–8
Fiji	17–14	—	19–10	13–16
Canada	17–18	10–19	—	19–10
Norfolk Island	8–24	16–13	10–19	—

== Knockout stage ==
Quarterfinals
A1	Australia	10
C2	New Zealand	14
D1	Malaysia	25
B2	Wales	22
B1	Cook Islands	23
D2	Fiji	12
C1	England	25
A2	Northern Ireland	11

Semifinals
C2	New Zealand	8
D1	Malaysia	16
B1	Cook Islands	11
C1	England	23

Final
D1	Malaysia	9
C1	England	17
Third place
C2	New Zealand	27
B1	Cook Islands	6
