= Elmer Abatayo =

Filipino lawn bowler

Personal information
- Nationality: Filipino

Achievements and titles
- Highest world ranking: 10 (October 2024)
Medal record
Representing (Philippines)
Southeast Asian Games
Silver medal – second place	2019 Pampanga	triples
Asian Lawn Bowls Championship
Gold medal – first place	2023 Kuala Lumpur	pairs
Gold medal – first place	2024 Pattaya	pairs

Elmer Metoda Abatayo is a Filipino international lawn bowler. He reached a career high ranking of world number 10 in October 2024.

== Career ==
Abatayo came to prominence when he won a silver medal at the 2019 SEA Games in Pampanga. Bowling with Christopher Dagpin and Hommer Mercado in the triples event they were defeated into second place by the favourites Malaysia.

In 2023, he won the gold medal (with Rodel Labayo) at the 14th Asian Lawn Bowls Championship in Kuala Lumpur.

He was selected as part of the team to represent the Philippines at the blue riband event of the sport, the 2023 World Outdoor Bowls Championship. He competed in the men's pairs and the men's fours events.

Abatayo successfully defended his pairs crown (with Labayo) at the 15th Asian Lawn Bowls Championship, held in Pattaya, Thailand, during March 2024.
