= Wattana Kadkhunthod =

Thai lawn bowler

Personal information
- Nationality: Thai

Sport
- Sport: Bowls
Medal record
Representing Thailand
Southeast Asian Games
Bronze medal – third place	2017 Kuala Lumpur	triples
Asian Lawn Bowls Championship
Gold medal – first place	2018 Xinxiang	singles

Wattana Kadkhunthod is an international Thai lawn and indoor bowler.

== Bowls career ==
Kadkhunthod won the gold medal at the 2018 Asian Lawn Bowls Championship in the singles. The previous year he had won a bronze medal as part of the Thai triples team in the Lawn bowls at the 2017 Southeast Asian Games.

In 2022, he qualified to represent Thailand at the 2022 World Bowls Indoor Championships. The event had been cancelled in 2020 and 2021 due to the COVID-19 pandemic.

In 2023, he participated in the 2023 World Bowls Indoor Championships in Barrack Heights, New South Wales, Australia.

In 2023, he was selected as part of the team to represent Thailand at the 2023 World Outdoor Bowls Championship. He participated in the men's pairs and the men's fours events.
