= Francesca Baleri =

South African lawn bowler

Personal information
- Nationality: South African
- Born: South Africa

Sport
- Sport: Lawn & indoor bowls
Medal record
Representing South Africa
African States Tournament
Silver medal – second place	2023	singles
Silver medal – second place	2023	pairs

Francesca Baleri is a South African international lawn and indoor bowler.

== Bowls career ==
Baleri came to prominence after winning the silver medal at the South African Junior Masters in 2023.

She was selected by the South African national team to represent them at the African States Tournament in June 2023, in Namibia, where she won double silver. The first silver was in the singles behind Jane Rigby, and the other came in the pairs.

In August 2023, Baleri was selected by the national team again, to represent them at the sport's blue riband event, the 2023 World Bowls Championship. She participated in the women's pairs and the women's fours events.
