= Rosita Bradborn =

Filipino lawn bowls player

Rosita 'Rose' Bradborn
Personal information
- Nationality: Filipino
- Born: 25 May 1973 (age 53) Daram, Samar, Philippines

Sport
- Club: Angeles Sports and Country Club

Achievements and titles
- Highest world ranking: 16 (November 2025)
Medal record
Women's lawn bowls
Representing Philippines
World Outdoor Championships
Bronze medal – third place	2016 Christchurch	fours
Asia Pacific Bowls Championships
Silver medal – second place	2005 Melbourne	pairs
Gold medal – first place	2009 Kuala Lumpur	singles
Bronze medal – third place	2009 Kuala Lumpur	pairs
Silver medal – second place	2011 Adelaide	pairs
Gold medal – first place	2015 Christchurch	triples
Southeast Asian Games
Silver medal – second place	2005 Manila	triples
Bronze medal – third place	2007 Nakhon Ratchasima	singles
Silver medal – second place	2017 Kuala Lumpur	triples
Silver medal – second place	2019 Philippines	fours
Asian Lawn Bowls Championship
Gold medal – first place	2023 Kuala Lumpur	pairs
Gold medal – first place	2024 Pattaya	singles

Rosita Etang Bradborn (born 1973) also known as Rose Bradborn, is a Philippines international lawn bowler. She reached a career high ranking of world number 20 in June 2025.

== Biography ==
She competed at the 2008 World Outdoor Bowls Championship and 2012 World Outdoor Bowls Championship but came to prominence when winning a bronze medal at the 2016 World Outdoor Bowls Championship in Christchurch in the fours with Hazel Jagonoy, Ronalyn Greenlees and Sonia Bruce.

She won five medals at the Asia Pacific Bowls Championships, of which two have been gold medals. In 2016, she won the Hong Kong International Bowls Classic pairs title with Sonia Bruce.

In 2020, she was selected for the sport's blue riband event, the 2020 World Outdoor Bowls Championship in Australia but the event was cancelled due to the COVID-19 pandemic.

In 2023, she won the pairs gold medal at the 14th Asian Lawn Bowls Championship in Kuala Lumpur. Later in 2023, she was selected as part of the team to represent Philippines at the 2023 World Outdoor Bowls Championship. She participated in the women's pairs and the women's fours events.

Bradborn won the singles crown at the 15th Asian Lawn Bowls Championship, held in Pattaya, Thailand, during March 2024 and later that year in November she finished runner-up in the singles to Cheryl Chan at the 2024 Hong Kong International Bowls Classic.
