= Nazura Ngahat =

Malaysian lawn bowler

Personal information
- Nationality: Malaysian
Medal record
Representing (Malaysia)
Asia Pacific Bowls Championships
Bronze medal – third place	2001 Melbourne	triples
Bronze medal – third place	2001 Melbourne	fours
Gold medal – first place	2003 Brisbane	pairs
Silver medal – second place	2003 Brisbane	fours
Southeast Asian Games
Gold medal – first place	2001 Kuala Lumpur	fours
Asian Lawn Bowls Championship
Gold medal – first place	2003 Kuala Lumpur	triples
Gold medal – first place	2003 Kuala Lumpur	fours

Nazura Ngahat is a Malaysian international lawn bowler.

== Bowls career ==
Ngahat has represented Malaysia at the Commonwealth Games, in the pairs events at the 2002 Commonwealth Games.

She won four medals at the Asia Pacific Bowls Championships including a gold medal in the 2003 pairs with Siti Zalina Ahmad, in Brisbane and in 2001, she won the gold medal in the fours event at the 2001 Southeast Asian Games in Kuala Lumpur.
