= 2023 World Outdoor Bowls Championship – Women's Fours =

Bowls competition

2023 World Outdoor Bowls Championships – Women's fours
- 14th World Outdoor Bowls Championships
- Location: Gold Coast, Australia
- Date: 29 August to 10 September
- Category: World Bowls Championship

The 2023 World Outdoor Bowls Championship – Women's fours will be the 14th edition of the World Championships to be held on the Gold Coast in Queensland, Australia from 29 August to 10 September. There will be five venues; the Broadbeach Bowls Club, Musgrave Hill Bowls Club, Club Helensvale, Paradise Point Club and Mudgeraba Club.

The women's fours is one of eight events that will determine the 2023 world champions.

== Section tables ==
=== Section 1 ===
Team	Player	P	W	D	L	Pts	Shots
1	(Australia) Kristina Krstic, Dawn Hayman, Lynsey Clarke, Kelsey Cottrell	6	6	0	0	18	75
2	(Canada) Joanna Cooper, Baylee van Steijn, Emma Boyd, Jordan Kos	6	5	0	1	15	42
3	(India) Lovely Choubey, Pinki Singh, Nayanmoni Saikia, Rupa Rani Tirkey	6	3	1	2	10	1
4	Ashleigh Rainey, Sarah Kelly, Shauna O'Neill, Chloe Wilson	6	3	0	3	9	15
5	(Norfolk Island) Ellie Dixon, Carla Miles, Petal Jones, Carmen Anderson	6	2	0	4	6	-15
6	(United States) Mary Spease, Janice Bell, Joan Robbins, Mary Ann Beath	6	1	1	4	4	-25
7	(Botswana) Lasedi Mafoko, Molatedi Douma, Chakale Robert, Gaoromelwe Pelemo	6	0	0	6	0	-93

=== Section 2 ===
Team	Player	P	W	D	L	Pts	Shots
1	(England) Sophie Tolchard, Jamie-Lea Marshall, Lorraine Kuhler, Amy Pharaoh	6	5	0	1	15	71
2	(South Africa) Thabelo Muvhango, Francesca Baleri, Esme Kruger, Anneke Snyman	6	5	0	1	15	65
3	(Malaysia) Aleena Nawawi, Ain Nabilah Tarmizi, Syafiqa Haidar Rahman, Azlina Arshad	6	4	1	1	13	41
4	(Jersey) Kim Hutchings, Sara Douglas, Rachel MacDonald, Fiona Archibald	6	3	1	2	10	22
5	(Fiji) Radhika Prasad, Elizabeth Moceiwai, Sheryl Edward, Litia Tikoisuva	6	2	0	4	6	6
6	(Switzerland) Andrea Locher, Caroline Lehmann, Simone Kunz, Marianne Kunzle	6	1	0	5	3	-57
7	(Turkey) AT Atalay, Busranur Uzun, Serap Usta, Sebiha Usta	6	0	0	6	0	-148

=== Section 3 ===
Team	Player	P	W	D	L	Pts	Shots
1	(New Zealand) Leeane Poulson, Selina Goddard, Val Smith, Katelyn Inch	5	5	0	0	15	48
2	(Wales) Sara Nicholls, Bethan Russ, Ysie White, Laura Daniels	5	3	0	2	9	22
3	(Malta) Rita Hedges, Rose Rixon, Rebecca Rixon, Connie Rixon	5	3	0	2	9	16
4	(Japan) Masako Sato, Sayuri Abiru, Midori Matsuoka, Hiroko Emura	5	2	0	3	6	-12
5	(Argentina) Virginia Bianco, Anabel Didlaukis, Ana Ramos, Gabriela Villamarin	5	1	0	4	3	-36
6	(Niue) Lynsey Talagi, Christine Hipa, Catherine Papani, Pilena Motufoou	5	1	0	4	3	-38
7	(Kenya) Crestine Masila, Fridah Mwangi, Jedidiah Maina, Esther Ndungu	withdrew					

=== Section 4 ===
Team	Player	P	W	D	L	Pts	Shots
1	(Scotland) Carla Banks, Claire Anderson, Stacey McDougall, Caroline Brown	7	5	0	2	15	38
2	(Hong Kong) Cheryl Chan, Phyllis Wong, Angel So, Helen Cheung	7	4	1	2	13	50
3	(Philippines) Asuncion Bruce, Hazel Jagonoy, Vilma Greenlees, Rosita Bradborn	7	4	0	3	12	14
4	(Thailand) Chamaipron Kotchawong, Tanida Kachanthornpak, Palita Gangur, Nannapat Tomak	7	4	0	3	12	12
5	(Cook Islands) Philomina Akaruru, Emily Jim, Rima Strickland, Tiare Jim	7	4	0	3	12	12
6	(Singapore) Sarah Ho Shu En, Leng Li Li, Cheo Ai Lin, May Lee Beng Hua	7	3	1	3	10	-13
7	(Papua New Guinea) May Osamae, Diane Siminali, Olive Roika, Klesha Walo	7	2	0	5	6	-83
8	(Zimbabwe) Caryn Sinclair, Caroline McDonnell, Melanie James, Heather Singleton	7	1	0	6	3	-30

== Finals ==
Play Offs
Australia	13
Hong Kong	8
Scotland	17
Canada	9
England	14
Wales	13
New Zealand	15
South Africa	12

Semifinals
Australia	19
Scotland	18
England	20
New Zealand	10

Gold medal
Australia	7
England	14

== Results ==
Women's fours section 1
Round 1 (28 Aug)		
United States	Botswana	19–9
India	Ireland	16–13
Canada	Norfolk Island	21–8
Round 2 (29 Aug)		
Australia	Ireland	23–7
Norfolk Island	Botswana	20–4
Canada	India	18–11
Round 3 (29 Aug)		
United States	Norfolk Island	6–18
Australia	Canada	12–10
Botswana	India	11–29
Round 4 (29 Aug)		
Ireland	Canada	14–17
United States	India	12–12
Australia	Botswana	26–5
Round 5 (30 Aug)		
Norfolk Island	India	13–22
Ireland	Botswana	26–15
Australia	United States	19–9
Round 6 (30 Aug)		
Canada	Botswana	22–5
Norfolk Island	Australia	12–16
Ireland	United States	18–9
Round 7 (31 Aug)		
India	Australia	5–27
Canada	United States	17–13
Norfolk Island	Ireland	6–23

Women's fours section 2
Round 1 (28 Aug)		
South Africa	Switzerland	20–8
Jersey	Malaysia	14–14
Turkey	Fiji	3–32
Round 2 (29 Aug)		
England	Malaysia	27–6
Fiji	Switzerland	14–9
Turkey	Jersey	7–18
Round 3 (29 Aug)		
South Africa	Fiji	20–13
England	Turkey	36–4
Switzerland	Jersey	6–25
Round 4 (30 Aug)		
Malaysia	Turkey	48–4
South Africa	Jersey	20–10
England	Switzerland	21–7
Round 5 (30 Aug)		
Fiji	Jersey	9–21
Malaysia	Switzerland	25–12
England	South Africa	6–18
Round 6 (30 Aug)		
Turkey	Switzerland	14–20
Fiji	England	15–21
Malaysia	South Africa	13–11
Round 7 (31 Aug)		
Jersey	England	10–20
Turkey	South Africa	4–30
Fiji	Malaysia	9–12

Women's fours section 3
Round 1 (28 Aug)		
New Zealand	Kenya	+
Wales	Niue	19–8
Argentina	Japan	14–19
Round 2 (29 Aug)		
New Zealand	Japan	19–9
Wales	Kenya	+
Malta	Argentina	9–11
Round 3 (29 Aug)		
Japan	Kenya	+
New Zealand	Malta	16–10
Niue	Argentina	17–10
Round 4 (29 Aug)		
Japan	Malta	8–20
Wales	Argentina	20–5
New Zealand	Niue	21–7
Round 5 (30 Aug)		
Kenya	Malta	+
Japan	Niue	15–6
New Zealand	Wales	17–10
Round 6 (30 Aug)		
Argentina	Kenya	+
Malta	Niue	16–5
Japan	Wales	13–17
Round 7 (31 Aug)		
Niue	Kenya	–
Argentina	New Zealand	9–20
Malta	Wales	14–13

Women's fours section 4
Round 1 (28 Aug)		
Philippines	Zimbabwe	9–16
Scotland	Papua New Guinea	33–6
Thailand	Hong Kong	12–10
Cook Islands	Singapore	17–8
Round 2 (29 Aug)		
Philippines	Hong Kong	9–21
Scotland	Zimbabwe	19–11
Singapore	Papua New Guinea	18–10
Cook Islands	Thailand	18–12
Round 3 (29 Aug)		
Hong Kong	Zimbabwe	21–10
Scotland	Singapore	8–17
Philippines	Cook Islands	19–16
Papua New Guinea	Thailand	7–24
Round 4 (29 Aug)		
Zimbabwe	Singapore	9–15
Hong Kong	Cook Islands	10–14
Scotland	Thailand	18–8
Philippines	Papua New Guinea	25–9
Round 5 (30 Aug)		
Zimbabwe	Cook Islands	11–13
Singapore	Thailand	6–16
Hong Kong	Papua New Guinea	31–7
Philippines	Scotland	8–15
Round 6 (30 Aug)		
Thailand	Zimbabwe	16–13
Cook Islands	Papua New Guinea	13–15
Singapore	Philippines	6–23
Hong Kong	Scotland	18–9
Round 7 (30 Aug)		
Papua New Guinea	Zimbabwe	19–12
Thailand	Philippines	9–13
Cook Islands	Scotland	9–13
Singapore	Hong Kong	11–11

+Kenya forfeited
