= Lovely Choubey =

Indian lawn bowler (born 1980)

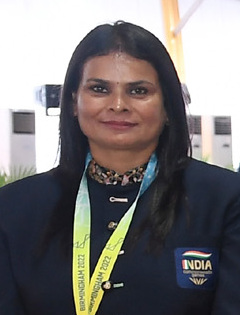
- Choubey in August 2022

Personal information
- Nationality: Indian
- Born: 3 August 1980 (age 45) Ranchi, Jharkhand, India
Medal record
Representing India
Commonwealth Games
Gold medal – first place	2022 Birmingham	fours
Asian Lawn Bowls Championship
Silver medal – second place	2014 Shenzhen	singles
Silver medal – second place	2014 Shenzhen	pairs
Gold medal – first place	2023 Kuala Lumpur	fours

Lovely Choubey (born 3 August 1980) is an Indian women's international lawn bowler.

== Bowls career ==
=== World Championships ===
Choubey was selected by the Indian national team, to represent them at the sport's blue riband event, the 2023 World Bowls Championship. She participated in the women's fours and the women's pairs events.

=== Commonwealth Games ===
Choubey has represented India at three Commonwealth Games; in the triples and fours at the 2014 Commonwealth Games, in the pairs and fours at the 2018 Commonwealth Games and in the pairs and fours at the 2022 Commonwealth Games. In the 2022 competition, she was part of the Indian Women's fours team, along with (Pinki Singh, Nayanmoni Saikia and Rupa Rani Tirkey) which won Gold beating South Africa in the final, 17–10.

=== Asian Championships ===
Choubey has won a silver medal in the singles as well as the pairs events at the 2014 Asian Lawn Bowls Championship.

In 2023, she won the fours gold medal at the 14th Asian Lawn Bowls Championship in Kuala Lumpur.
