= Hiroko Emura =

Japanese lawn bowler

Personal information
- Nationality: Japanese
Medal record
Representing (Japan)
Asia Pacific Bowls Championships
Bronze medal – third place	2011 Adelaide	fours

Hiroko Emura is a Japanese international lawn bowler.

== Bowls career ==
Emura won a fours bronze medal (with Masako Satoh, Noriko Maebayashi and Atsumi Ono), at the 2011 Asia Pacific Bowls Championships in Adelaide.

Emura was selected as part of the five woman team by Japan for the sport's blue riband event, the 2020 World Outdoor Bowls Championship but the event was cancelled due to the COVID-19 pandemic.

In 2023, she was selected as part of the team to represent Japan at the 2023 World Outdoor Bowls Championship. She participated in the women's triples and the women's fours events.
