= 2023 World Outdoor Bowls Championship – Men's Pairs =

Bowls competition

2023 World Outdoor Bowls Championships – Men's pairs
- 14th World Outdoor Bowls Championships
- Location: Gold Coast, Australia
- Date: 29 August to 10 September
- Category: World Bowls Championship

The 2023 World Outdoor Bowls Championship – Men's pairs will be the 14th edition of the World Championships to be held on the Gold Coast in Queensland, Australia from 29 August to 10 September. There will be five venues; the Broadbeach Bowls Club, Musgrave Hill Bowls Club, Club Helensvale, Paradise Point Club and Mudgeraba Club.

The men's pairs is one of eight events that will determine the 2023 world champions.

== Section tables ==
=== Section 1 ===
Team	Player	P	W	D	L	Pts	Shots
1	(Wales) Daniel Salmon & Jarrad Breen	8	8	0	0	24	102
2	(Australia) Aaron Wilson & Aaron Teys	8	7	0	1	21	99
3	(Jersey) Malcolm De Sousa & Derek Boswell	8	4	1	3	13	22
4	(Singapore) Anthony Loh Lee Kee Sin & Deepan Ramachandra	8	4	0	4	12	10
5	(Philippines) Elmer Abatayo & Rodel Labayo	8	4	0	4	12	4
6	(Norfolk Island) Trevor Gow & Matt Bigg	8	4	0	4	12	-18
7	(Malta) Peter Tonna & Wesley Hedges	8	1	2	5	5	-39
8	(Argentina) Ricardo Rubinat & Raul Pollet	8	1	1	6	4	-86
9	(Samoa) Avala Savaiinaea & Tasesa Tafeaga	8	1	0	7	3	-94

=== Section 2 ===
Team	Player	P	W	D	L	Pts	Shots
1	Gary Kelly & Adam McKeown	8	7	0	1	21	90
2	(India) Putul Sonowal & Sunil Bahadur	8	7	0	1	21	56
3	(Hong Kong) Tony Cheung & Lee Ka Ho	8	6	1	1	19	48
4	(Zimbabwe) Myles Hooper & Clive Robertson	8	5	0	3	15	25
5	(United States) Bob Schneider & Charlie Herbert	8	4	1	3	13	60
6	(Macau) Wong Chi Hong & Cheong Pak Keong	8	3	0	5	9	-16
7	(Botswana) Michael Gabobewe & George Kieni	8	2	0	6	6	-39
8	(France) Dorian Dumont & Guillaume Hertzog	8	1	0	7	3	-85
9	(Spain) Terry Morgan & John Pooley	8	0	0	8	0	-139

=== Section 3 ===
Team	Player	P	W	D	L	Pts	Shots
1	(Canada) John Bezear & Ryan Bester	8	6	0	2	20	87
2	(New Zealand) Tony Grantham & Andrew Kelly	8	6	1	1	19	79
3	(England) Ed Morris & Sam Tolchard	8	6	1	1	19	73
4	(Thailand) Uthen Ontong & Wattana Kadkhunthod	8	6	0	2	18	59
5	(Netherlands) Maus Van Tol & Frank De Vries	8	3	0	5	9	-48
6	(Turkey) Serkan Akar & Ozkan Akar	8	3	0	5	90	-82
7	(Fiji) Lal Chand Prasad & Munesh Kumar	8	2	0	6	6	6
8	(Namibia) Christo Steenkamp & Schalk Van Wyk	8	2	0	6	6	-48
9	(Japan) Takashi Ohira & Tetsuya Hirouchi	8	0	0	8	0	-126
10	(Kenya) Benson Kariuki Wambugu & Cephas Kimwaki Kimani	withdrew					

=== Section 4 ===
Team	Player	P	W	D	L	Pts	Shots
1	(Scotland) Jason Banks & Iain McLean	9	9	0	0	27	88
2	(Malaysia) Izzat Dzulkeple & Soufi Rusli	9	8	0	1	24	99
3	(Cook Islands) Aidan Zittersteijn & Taiki Paniani	9	6	0	3	18	53
4	(South Africa) Wayne Rittmuller & Niksa Benguric	9	6	0	3	18	45
5	(Israel) Danny Alonim & Dani Slodownik	9	4	0	5	12	44
6	(Papua New Guinea) Manu Walo & Fred Koisen	9	4	0	5	12	4
7	(Switzerland) Markus Merz & Beat Matti	9	3	0	6	9	-17
8	(Sweden) Olle Bäckgren & Pontus Palmkvist	9	3	0	6	9	-34
9	(Niue) Keith Papani & Gregory Funaki	9	2	0	7	6	-103
10	(Falkland Islands) Garry Tyrrell & Christopher Locke	9	0	0	9	0	-179

== Finals ==
Play Offs
Wales	14
Malaysia	15
Scotland	2
Australia	19
Ireland	16
New Zealand	13
Canada	23
India	7

Semifinals
Malaysia	12
Australia	23
Ireland	22
Canada	6

Gold medal
Australia	11
Ireland	19

== Results ==
Men's pairs section 1
Round 1 (28 Aug)		
Australia	Argentina	26–7
Wales	Philippines	15–10
Malta	Jersey	17–17
Singapore	Norfolk Island	21–10
Round 2 (29 Aug)		
Singapore	Jersey	16–18
Wales	Malta	29–6
Australia	Philippines	27–9
Samoa	Argentina	13–21
Round 3 (29 Aug)		
Samoa	Wales	8–23
Argentina	Jersey	1–32
Philippines	Norfolk Island	21–10
Malta	Singapore	15–9
Round 4 (30 Aug)		
Norfolk Island	Malta	20–17
Jersey	Philippines	23–10
Argentina	Wales	4–26
Australia	Samoa	36–6
Round 5 (30 Aug)		
Jersey	Australia	10–24
Norfolk Island	Samoa	25–6
Singapore	Argentina	20–14
Philippines	Malta	15–11
Round 6 (30 Aug)		
Philippines	Singapore	15–16
Argentina	Norfolk Island	15–16
Samoa	Jersey	15–19
Wales	Australia	15–13
Round 7 (31 Aug)		
Wales	Norfolk Island	23–8
Australia	Singapore	19–13
Malta	Samoa	10–18
Argentina	Philippines	11–26
Round 8 (31 Aug)		
Malta	Argentina	18–18
Singapore	Samoa	28–13
Australia	Norfolk Island	19–12
Wales	Jersey	19–8
Round 9 (31 Aug)		
Samoa	Philippines	8–19
Malta	Australia	12–19
Singapore	Wales	15–24
Norfolk Island	Jersey	17–14

Men's pairs section 2
Round 1 (28 Aug)		
Ireland	Macau	22–6
Hong Kong	France	22–6
Zimbabwe	United States	14–12
India	Spain	29–14
Round 2 (29 Aug)		
India	United States	16–15
Hong Kong	Zimbabwe	18–11
Ireland	France	29–11
Botswana	Macau	17–19
Round 3 (29 Aug)		
Botswana	Hong Kong	12–15
Macau	United States	8–30
France	Spain	12–0
Zimbabwe	India	9–22
Round 4 (30 Aug)		
Spain	Zimbabwe	5–35
United States	France	20–9
Macau	Hong Kong	13–18
Ireland	Botswana	27–12
Round 5 (30 Aug)		
United States	Ireland	10–17
Spain	Botswana	9–31
India	Macau	25–15
France	Zimbabwe	13–20
Round 6 (30 Aug)		
France	India	16–25
Macau	Spain	21–11
Botswana	United States	8–41
Hong Kong	Ireland	14–11
Round 7 (31 Aug)		
Hong Kong	Spain	33–12
Ireland	India	14–12
Zimbabwe	Botswana	22–9
Macau	France	32–4
Round 8 (31 Aug)		
Zimbabwe	Macau	17–14
India	Botswana	17–14
Ireland	Spain	32–7
Hong Kong	United States	14–14
Round 9 (31 Aug)		
Botswana	France	19–11
Zimbabwe	Ireland	14–24
India	Hong Kong	17–10
Spain	United States	9–13

Men's pairs section 3
Round 1 (28 Aug)		
New Zealand	Kenya	+
England	Netherlands	30–8
Japan	Canada	9–32
Fiji	Namibia	15–16
Thailand	Turkey	31–11
Round 2 (29 Aug)		
Namibia	Canada	16–24
England	Japan	20–8
Netherlands	New Zealand	14–18
Kenya	Turkey	+
Fiji	Thailand	15–18
Round 3 (29 Aug)		
Turkey	England	10–25
Canada	Kenya	+
Netherlands	Fiji	8–27
Namibia	Japan	20–11
New Zealand	Thailand	12–18
Round 4 (30 Aug)		
Japan	Fiji	8–29
Canada	Netherlands	29–7
Kenya	England	+
New Zealand	Turkey	32–5
Thailand	Namibia	24–15
Round 5 (30 Aug)		
New Zealand	Canada	16–16
Fiji	Turkey	10–15
Kenya	Namibia	+
Japan	Netherlands	10–33
Thailand	England	10–20
Round 6 (30 Aug)		
Namibia	Netherlands	13–17
Fiji	Kenya	+
Turkey	Canada	6–32
England	New Zealand	9–17
Thailand	Japan	25–5
Round 7 (31 Aug)		
England	Fiji	21–14
Namibia	New Zealand	10–28
Japan	Turkey	14–19
Netherlands	Kenya	+
Canada	Thailand	18–13
Round 8 (31 Aug)		
Japan	Kenya	+
Turkey	Namibia	20–16
Fiji	New Zealand	8–23
Canada	England	17–17
Netherlands	Thailand	10–26
Round 9 (31 Aug)		
Turkey	Netherlands	14–22
New Zealand	Japan	23–10
Namibia	England	10–25
Fiji	Canada	11–14
Thailand	Kenya	+

Men's pairs section 4
Round 1 (28 Aug)		
Scotland	Sweden	18–12
Malaysia	Cook Islands	19–14
Niue	South Africa	11–32
Israel	Falkland Islands	33–3
Switzerland	Papua New Guinea	13–22
Round 2 (29 Aug)		
Falkland Islands	South Africa	7–29
Malaysia	Niue	35–8
Cook Islands	Scotland	13–24
Sweden	Papua New Guinea	9–29
Israel	Switzerland	26–7
Round 3 (29 Aug)		
Papua New Guinea	Malaysia	6–21
South Africa	Sweden	17–14
Cook Islands	Israel	16–12
Falkland Islands	Niue	12–17
Scotland	Switzerland	19–12
Round 4 (30 Aug)		
Niue	Israel	9–32
South Africa	Cook Islands	16–12
Sweden	Malaysia	9–28
Scotland	Papua New Guinea	21–15
Switzerland	Falkland Islands	31–3
Round 5 (30 Aug)		
Scotland	South Africa	16–11
Israel	Papua New Guinea	20–12
Sweden	Falkland Islands	29–8
Niue	Cook Islands	11–23
Switzerland	Malaysia	11–24
Round 6 (30 Aug)		
Falkland Islands	Cook Islands	10–25
Israel	Sweden	14–20
Papua New Guinea	South Africa	12–18
Malaysia	Scotland	15–19
Switzerland	Niue	19–8
Round 7 (31 Aug)		
Malaysia	Israel	22–13
Falkland Islands	Scotland	11–39
Niue	Papua New Guinea	11–16
Cook Islands	Sweden	26–5
South Africa	Switzerland	9–17
Round 8 (31 Aug)		
Niue	Sweden	20–19
Papua New Guinea	Falkland Islands	28–9
Israel	Scotland	12–23
South Africa	Malaysia	13–17
Cook Islands	Switzerland	18–11
Round 9 (31 Aug)		
Papua New Guinea	Cook Islands	5–19
Scotland	Niue	22–12
Falkland Islands	Malaysia	8–19
Israel	South Africa	12–18
Switzerland	Sweden	8–17

+ Kenya forfeited
