= Izzat Dzulkeple =

Malaysian lawn bowler (born 1982)

Personal information
- Full name: Izzat Shameer Dzulkeple
- Nationality: Malaysian
- Born: 24 June 1982 (age 44) Perak, Malaysia

Sport
- Sport: Bowls

Achievements and titles
- Highest world ranking: 1 (September 2024)
Medal record
Representing Malaysia
World Outdoor Championships
Bronze medal – third place	2023 Gold Coast	pairs
Asia Pacific Bowls Championships
Bronze medal – third place	2015 Christchurch	fours
Bronze medal – third place	2019 Gold Coast	pairs
World Champion of Champions
Silver medal – second place	2022 Wellington	singles
Bowls World Cup
Bronze medal – third place	2025 Kuala Lumpur	singles
Hong Kong International Bowls Classic
Silver medal – second place	2023	singles
Gold medal – first place	2023	pairs
Southeast Asian Games
Gold medal – first place	2019 Philippines	triples
Asian Lawn Bowls Championship
Gold medal – first place	2018 Xinxiang	triples
Gold medal – first place	2023 Kuala Lumpur	singles
Gold medal – first place	2024 Pattaya	singles
Gold medal – first place	2025 Clark	triples
Commonwealth Games
Silver medal – second place	2026 Glasgow	singles

Izzat Shameer Dzulkeple (born 24 June 1982) is an international Malaysian lawn bowler. He reached a career high ranking of world number 1 in September 2024.

== Bowls career ==
=== World Championships ===
In 2020, he was selected for the 2020 World Outdoor Bowls Championship in Australia, which resulted in cancellation following the COVID-19 pandemic. He was selected by the Malaysian national team, to represent them at the sport's blue riband event, the 2023 World Bowls Championship.

He participated in the men's singles and the men's pairs events. The Malaysian team ranked seventh in the world at the start of the tournament, were given the target of reaching the semi finals. In the pairs with Idham Amin Ramlan, they won a bronze medal and one week later, in the singles, he won his group undfeated but then lost to Ryan Bester at the quarter final stage.

=== Commonwealth Games ===
In 2022, he competed in the men's triples and the men's fours at the 2022 Commonwealth Games.

Dzulkeple won the silver medal in the men's singles at the 2026 Commonwealth Games in Glasgow, Scotland, losing to Sam Tolchard of England in the final.

=== Other major events ===
Dzulkeple won a fours bronze medal in the 2015 Asia Pacific Bowls Championships and a pairs bronze four years later at the 2019 Asia Pacific Bowls Championships in the Gold Coast, Queensland. He also won a gold medal in the triples at the Lawn bowls at the 2019 Southeast Asian Games.

In September in 2022, he married Arisha Roslan before sealing a third national title at the Bukit Kiara Sports Complex. He had previously won the title in 2013 and 2017. In November 2022, he won the silver medal at the World Singles Champion of Champions in Wellington, New Zealand.

In 2023, he experienced a very successful season, winning the singles gold medal at the 14th Asian Lawn Bowls Championship in Kuala Lumpur and then winning the national championships, before sealing a gold (pairs with Muhammad Hizlee Abdul Rais) and a silver (singles) at the Hong Kong International Bowls Classic. He successfully defended the gold medal in the singles at the 15th Asian Lawn Bowls Championship, held in Pattaya, Thailand, during March 2024.

In 2025 he won a gold medal in the triples at the 16th Asian Lawn Bowls Championship in Clark City, Philippines.
