= Courtney Meneely =

Irish bowler (born 1994)

Personal information
- Nationality: British (Northern Irish)
- Born: 25 May 1994 (age 32)

Sport
- Sport: Lawn bowls
- Club: Ewarts BC (outdoors)
Medal record
Representing combined Ireland
Atlantic Bowls Championships
Bronze medal – third place	2019 Cardiff	triples

Courtney Meneely (born 25 May 1994), also known as Courtney Wright, is a Northern Irish international lawn bowler.

== Bowls career ==
Meneely became the Irish champion in 2018 after winning the singles at the Irish National Bowls Championships and was named Irish bowler of the year. In 2019 she won the triples bronze medal at the Atlantic Bowls Championships.

In 2022 she competed in the women's triples and the Women's fours at the 2022 Commonwealth Games.
