= Shermeen Lim =

Singaporean bowls player

Personal information
- Nationality: Singaporean
- Born: 14 May 1989 (age 37)
Medal record
Representing Singapore
women's lawn bowls
Asian Lawn Bowls Championship
Gold medal – first place	2018 China	singles
Southeast Asian Games
Gold medal – first place	2019 Philippines	triples

Shermeen Xin Yi Lim (born 14 May 1989) is a Singaporean international lawn bowler. She is the former Asian women's singles champion, a Southeast Asian Games gold medallist and has represented Singapore at the Commonwealth Games. She has also won three National titles.

In 2018, she won the women's singles at the Asian Lawn Bowls Championship and one year later in 2019, won a gold medal in the triples at the Lawn bowls at the Southeast Asian Games. She was also selected for the cancelled 2020 World Outdoor Bowls Championship.

In 2022, she competed at the 2022 Commonwealth Games in Birmingham, in the women's singles and the women's triples at the Games.
