= Nayanmoni Saikia =

Indian lawn bowler (born 1988)

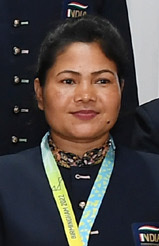
- Saikia in August 2022

Personal information
- Nationality: Indian
- Born: 21 September 1988 (age 37) Golaghat, Assam, India

Achievements and titles
- Highest world ranking: 24 (August 2024)
Medal record
Women's lawn bowls
Representing India
Commonwealth Games
Gold medal – first place	2022 Birmingham	fours
Asian Lawn Bowls Championship
Gold medal – first place	2017 New Delhi	triples
Bronze medal – third place	2018 Xinxiang	fours
Gold medal – first place	2023 Kuala Lumpur	fours
Gold medal – first place	2024 Pattaya	pairs

Nayanmoni Saikia (born 21 September 1988) is an Indian women's international lawn bowler.

== Bowls career ==
=== World Championship ===
In 2023, she was selected by the Indian national team, to represent them at the sport's blue riband event, the 2023 World Bowls Championship. She participated in the women's pairs and the women's fours events.

=== Commonwealth Games ===
Saikia has represented India at three Commonwealth Games; in the triples and fours at the 2014 Commonwealth Games, in the pairs and fours at the 2018 Commonwealth Games and in the pairs and fours at the 2022 Commonwealth Games. In the 2022 competition, she was part of the Indian Women's fours team, along with Lovely Choubey, Pinki Singh and Rupa Rani Tirkey which won gold medal beating South Africa in the final, 17-10.

=== Asian Championships ===
In the Asian Lawn Bowls Championship, Saikia has won gold in women's triples in 2017 and bronze in women's fours in 2018.

In 2023, she won the fours gold medal at the 14th Asian Lawn Bowls Championship in Kuala Lumpur and the following year won the gold medal in the pairs at the 15th Asian Lawn Bowls Championship, held in Pattaya, Thailand, during March 2024.

== Awards ==
She has been awarded Arjuna Award in 2022 by Government of India.
