= Rodel Labayo =

Filipino lawn bowler

Personal information
- Nationality: Filipino

Achievements and titles
- Highest world ranking: 78 (December 2024)
Medal record
Representing (Philippines)
Southeast Asian Games
Gold medal – first place	2019 Pampanga	pairs
Asian Lawn Bowls Championship
Gold medal – first place	2023 Kuala Lumpur	pairs
Gold medal – first place	2024 Pattaya	pairs

Rodel Vasquez Labayo is a Filipino international lawn bowler.

== Career ==
Labayao came to prominence when he won the gold medal at the 2019 SEA Games in Pampanga. Bowling with Angelo Morales in the pairs event they defeated Thailand into second place and the favourites Malaysia, who had to settle for bronze.

He was selected as part of the five man team by the Philippines for the 2020 World Outdoor Bowls Championship, which was due to be held in the Gold Coast, Australia but the event was cancelled due to the COVID-19 pandemic.

In 2023, he won the gold medal (with Elmer Abatayo) at the 14th Asian Lawn Bowls Championship in Kuala Lumpur. Later in 2023, he was selected as part of the team to represent the Philippines at the 2023 World Outdoor Bowls Championship. He participated in the men's singles and the men's pairs events.

Labayo successfully defended his pairs crown (with Abatayo) at the 15th Asian Lawn Bowls Championship, held in Pattaya, Thailand, during March 2024.
