= Claire Anderson (bowls) =

British lawn bowler

Claire Anderson (née Claire Walker)
Personal information
- Nationality: British (Scottish)
- Born: 1992 (age 33–34)

Sport
- Sport: Lawn bowls
- Club: Eddlewood BC (outdoors); Blantyre IBC (indoors)

Achievements and titles
- Highest world ranking: 38 (June 2024)
Medal record
Women's bowls
Representing Scotland
World Outdoor Championships
Bronze medal – third place	2023 Gold Coast	fours
Bronze medal – third place	2023 Gold Coast	pairs
World Bowls Indoor Championships
Bronze medal – third place	2025 Aberdeen	mixed pairs

Claire Anderson née Claire Walker (born 1992) is a Scottish international lawn bowler.

== Bowls career ==
Walker won the indoor National triples in 2015 and 2018, the indoor pairs in 2016, the British indoor triples in 2016 and the pairs in 2017.

In 2019, she married former indoor world champion Stewart Anderson and played under her married name afterwards.

In 2020, Anderson was selected for the 2020 World Outdoor Bowls Championship in Australia but the event was cancelled due to the COVID-19 pandemic. In 2023, she was selected as part of the team to represent Scotland at the 2023 World Outdoor Bowls Championship. She participated in the women's pairs and the women's fours events. In the fours, her team won the bronze medal. One week later in the pairs partnering Emma McIntyre, she won a bronze medal, losing to Malaysia in the semi final.

Partnering her husband Stewart in the mixed pairs, she won the bronze medal at the 2025 World Bowls Indoor Championships in Aberdeen.
