= 2023 World Outdoor Bowls Championship – Women's Triples =

Bowls competition

2023 World Outdoor Bowls Championships – Women's triples
- 14th World Outdoor Bowls Championships
- Location: Gold Coast, Australia
- Date: 29 August to 10 September
- Category: World Bowls Championship

The 2023 World Outdoor Bowls Championship – Women's triples will be the 14th edition of the World Championships to be held on the Gold Coast in Queensland, Australia from 29 August to 10 September. There will be five venues; the Broadbeach Bowls Club, Musgrave Hill Bowls Club, Club Helensvale, Paradise Point Club and Mudgeraba Club.

The women's triples is one of eight events that will determine the 2023 world champions.

== Section tables ==
=== Section 1 ===
Team	Player	P	W	D	L	Shots	Pts
1	(Australia) Dawn Hayman, Lynsey Clarke, Kelsey Cottrell	6	6	0	0	92	18
2	Sophie McIntyre, Shauna O'Neill, Chloe Wilson	6	4	1	1	30	13
3	(Hong Kong) Cheryl Chan, Phyllis Wong, Gloria Ha	6	3	1	2	25	10
4	(Israel) Karni Amit, Amaliya Levy, Ruthie Gilor	6	3	0	3	-45	9
5	(Fiji) Radhika Prasad, Sheryl Edward, Litia Tikoisuva	6	2	0	4	-11	6
6	(Botswana) Molatedi Douma, Chakale Robert, Gaoromelwe Mpopi Pelemo	6	1	0	5	-40	3
7	(Argentina) Virginia Bianco, Anabel Didlaukis, Gabriela Villamarin	6	1	0	5	-51	3

=== Section 2 ===
Team	Player	P	W	D	L	Shots	Pts
1	(New Zealand) Tayla Bruce, Val Smith, Leeane Poulson	7	7	0	0	80	21
2	(Canada) Joanna Cooper, Baylee van Steijn, Emma Boyd	7	5	1	1	47	16
3	(Jersey) Sara Douglas, Megan Kivlin, Fiona Archibald	7	4	0	3	11	12
4	(Wales) Melanie Thomas, Laura Daniels, Bethan Russ	7	3	1	3	24	10
5	(Cook Islands) Philomina Akaruru, Rima Strickland, Teokorai Jim	7	3	1	3	3	10
6	(Japan) Masako Sato, Midori Matsuoka, Hiroko Emura	7	1	3	3	-15	6
7	(Zimbabwe) Caroline McDonnell, Melanie James, Heather Singleton	7	1	2	4	-26	5
8	(Switzerland) Andrea Locher, Caroline Lehmann, Simone Kunz	7	0	0	7	-124	0

=== Section 3 ===
Team	Player	P	W	D	L	Shots	Pts
1	(India) Tania Choudhary, Pinki Singh, Rupa Rani Tirkey	7	7	0	0	64	21
2	(Malaysia) Alyani Jamil, Syafiqa Haidar Rahman, Azlina Arshad	7	5	1	1	39	16
3	(Scotland) Carla Banks, Stacey McDougall, Caroline Brown	7	4	1	2	24	13
4	(Norfolk Island) Ellie Dixon, Carla Miles, Petal Jones	7	4	0	3	20	12
5	(Philippines) Asuncion Bruce, Hazel Jagonoy, Vilma Greenlees	7	3	0	4	14	9
6	(Singapore) Leng Li Li, Cheo Ai Lin, May Lee Beng Hua	7	2	0	5	-21	6
7	(Papua New Guinea) Diane Siminali, Olive Roika, Piwen Karkar	7	2	0	5	-52	6
8	(Niue) Lynsey Talagi, Christine Hipa, Joy Peyroux	7	0	0	7	-88	0

=== Section 4 ===
Team	Player	P	W	D	L	Shots	Pts
1	(England) Jamie-Lea Marshall, Lorraine Kuhler, Katherine Rednall	5	5	0	0	54	15
2	(South Africa) Thabelo Muvhango, Esme Kruger, Anneke Snyman	5	4	0	1	43	12
3	(United States) Mary Spease, Joan Robbins, Mary Ann Beath	5	2	0	3	-32	6
4	(Malta) Rita Hedges, Irene Attard, Rose Rixon	5	1	1	3	-17	4
5	(Thailand) Chamaipron Kotchawong, Tanida Kachanthornpak, Nannapat Tomak	5	1	1	3	-19	4
6	(Turkey) Sebiha Usta, Serap Usta, Bahar Cil	5	1	0	4	-29	3
7	(Kenya) Crestine Masila, Fridah Mwangi, Esther Ndungu	withdrew					

== Finals ==
Play Offs
Australia	19
South Africa	13
England	18
Ireland	19
New Zealand	14
Malaysia	13
India	9
Canada	20

Semifinals
Australia	14
Ireland	13
New Zealand	20
Canada	9

Gold medal
Australia	15
New Zealand	9

== Results ==
Women's triples section 1
Round 1 (4 Sep)		
Fiji	Botswana	23–12
Israel	Hong Kong	10–24
Argentina	Ireland	11–20
Round 2 (5 Sep)		
Australia	Hong Kong	26–11
Ireland	Botswana	17–15
Argentina	Israel	10–21
Round 3 (5 Sep)		
Fiji	Ireland	14–21
Australia	Argentina	19–10
Botswana	Israel	10–13
Round 4 (5 Sep)		
Hong Kong	Argentina	26–5
Fiji	Israel	13–15
Australia	Botswana	23–5
Round 5 (5 Sep)		
Hong Kong	Botswana	16–17
Ireland	Israel	29–5
Australia	Fiji	23–8
Round 6 (6 Sep)		
Argentina	Botswana	20–13
Ireland	Australia	8–20
Hong Kong	Fiji	18–12
Round 7 (7 Sep)		
Israel	Australia	8–31
Argentina	Fiji	9–17
Ireland	Hong Kong	16–16

Women's triples section 2
Round 1 (4 Sep)		
Wales	Japan	15–15
New Zealand	Cook Islands	20–8
Switzerland	Canada	6–38
Jersey	Zimbabwe	20–16
Round 2 (5 Sep)		
Wales	Canada	11–16
New Zealand	Japan	21–17
Zimbabwe	Cook Islands	7–26
Jersey	Switzerland	18–8
Round 3 (5 Sep)		
Canada	Japan	16–12
New Zealand	Zimbabwe	21–12
Wales	Jersey	19–6
Cook Islands	Switzerland	23–9
Round 4 (5 Sep)		
Canada	Jersey	17–10
New Zealand	Switzerland	29–6
Wales	Cook Islands	12–14
Japan	Zimbabwe	14–14
Round 5 (5 Sep)		
Zimbabwe	Switzerland	27–9
Canada	Cook Islands	25–15
Wales	New Zealand	12–22
Japan	Jersey	6–24
Round 6 (6 Sep)		
Jersey	Cook Islands	18–8
Zimbabwe	Wales	9–21
Canada	New Zealand	10–21
Switzerland	Japan	12–23
Round 7 (7 Sep)		
Switzerland	Wales	12–28
Jersey	New Zealand	14–25
Zimbabwe	Canada	16–16
Cook Islands	Japan	15–15

Women's triples section 3
Round 1 (4 Sep)		
Malaysia	Papua New Guinea	29–11
Scotland	India	12–14
Niue	Philippines	11–23
Singapore	Norfolk Island	14–18
Round 2 (5 Sep)		
Malaysia	Philippines	20–14
Scotland	Papua New Guinea	16–13
Norfolk Island	India	12–16
Singapore	Niue	28–7
Round 3 (5 Sep)		
Philippines	Papua New Guinea	22–13
Scotland	Norfolk Island	17–10
Malaysia	Singapore	15–11
India	Niue	23–8
Round 4 (5 Sep)		
Philippines	Singapore	14–15
Scotland	Niue	19–11
Malaysia	India	13–16
Papua New Guinea	Norfolk Island	8–24
Round 5 (5 Sep)		
Norfolk Island	Niue	24–9
Philippines	India	13–14
Malaysia	Scotland	14–14
Papua New Guinea	Singapore	21–17
Round 6 (6 Sep)		
Singapore	India	6–29
Norfolk Island	Malaysia	14–19
Philippines	Scotland	20–18
Niue	Papua New Guinea	12–18
Round 7 (7 Sep)		
Niue	Malaysia	12–23
Singapore	Scotland	10–20
Norfolk Island	Philippines	14–13
India	Papua New Guinea	25–9

Women's triples section 4
Round 1 (4 Sep)		
Thailand	United States	16–18
Turkey	England	11–23
South Africa	Kenya	+
Round 2 (5 Sep)		
South Africa	United States	21–8
England	Kenya	+
Malta	Thailand	13–13
Round 3 (5 Sep)		
United States	Kenya	+
South Africa	Malta	20–14
Turkey	Thailand	12–16
Round 4 (5 Sep)		
United States	Malta	16–14
England	Thailand	21–9
South Africa	Turkey	28–9
Round 5 (5 Sep)		
United States	Turkey	7–21
South Africa	England	15–19
Kenya	Malta	+
Round 6 (6 Sep)		
Malta	Turkey	17–9
United States	England	13–22
Thailand	Kenya	+
Round 7 (6 Sep)		
Thailand	South Africa	9–18
Malta	England	11–18
Turkey	Kenya	+

+forfeited
