= Lawn bowls at the 2022 Commonwealth Games – Women's fours =

Bowls event

Lawn bowls women's four at the 2022 Commonwealth Games
- Venue: Victoria Park
- Dates: 29 July – 2 August 2022
- Competitors: 64 from 16 nations

Medalists
gold medal	Lovely Choubey; Pinki Singh; Nayanmoni Saikia; Rupa Rani Tirkey	India
silver medal	Thabelo Muvhango; Bridget Calitz; Esme Kruger; Johanna Snyman	South Africa
bronze medal	Selina Goddard; Nicole Toomey; Tayla Bruce; Val Smith	New Zealand

Lawn bowls at the 2022 Commonwealth Games – Women's fours was held at the Victoria Park from July 29 to August 2. A total of 64 athletes from 16 associations participated in the event. India won the gold medal, defeating South Africa in the final. New Zealand won the bronze medal.

== Sectional play ==
The top two from each section advance to the knockout stage.

=== Section A ===
Rank	Nation	Athletes	MP	MW	MT	ML	FR	AG	PD	PTS
1	Fiji	Radhika Prasad, Losalini Tukai, Loreta Kotoisuva, Sheral Mar	3	2	0	1	40	44	-4	6
2	Botswana	Lesego Mottladiile, Boikhutso Mooketsi, Lephai Marea Modutlwa, Jocelyn Tshenolo Moshokgo	3	1	1	1	52	43	+9	4
3	Australia	Kristina Krstic, Lynsey Clarke, Rebecca Van Asch, Natasha Van Eldik	3	1	1	1	40	41	-1	4
4	Scotland	Hannah Smith, Claire Johnston, Lauren Baillie-Whyte, Caroline Brown	3	1	0	2	39	43	-4	3

	Australia	Botswana	Fiji	Scotland
Australia	—	15–15	16–10	9–16
Botswana	15–15	—	21–11	16–17
Fiji	10–16	13–12	—	17–16
Scotland	16–9	12–13	11–21	—

=== Section B ===
Rank	Nation	Athletes	MP	MW	MT	ML	FR	AG	PD	PTS
1	New Zealand	Selina Goddard, Nicole Toomey, Tayla Bruce, Val Smith	3	2	1	0	61	29	+32	7
2	South Africa	Thabelo Muvhango, Bridget Calitz, Esme Kruger, Johanna Snyman	3	2	1	0	54	36	+18	7
3	Wales	Sara Nicholls, Caroline Taylor, Ysie White, Anwen Butten	3	1	0	2	55	40	+15	3
4	Niue	Tagaloa Tukuitoga, Liline Tagaloa Hewett, Hina Rereiti, Selasiosiana Sionetamasi Simpson	3	0	0	3	16	81	-65	0

	Niue	New Zealand	South Africa	Wales
Niue	—	3–29	7–24	6–28
New Zealand	29–3	—	14–14	18–12
South Africa	24–7	14–14	—	16–15
Wales	28–6	12–18	15–16	—

=== Section C ===
Rank	Nation	Athletes	MP	MW	MT	ML	FR	AG	PD	PTS
1	Norfolk Island	Ellie Dixon, Petal Jones, Essie Sanchez, Carmen Anderson	3	3	0	0	54	30	+24	9
2	Northern Ireland	Megan Devlin, Ashleigh Rainey, Courtney Meneely, Chloe Wilson	3	2	0	1	35	37	-2	6
3	Malaysia	Emma Firyana Saroji, Nur Ain Nabilah Tarmizi, Syafiqa Haidar Afif Abdul Rahman, Azlina Arshad	3	1	0	2	44	40	+4	3
4	Malta	Irene Attard, Rosemaree Rixon, Rebecca Rixon, Connie-Leigh Rixon	3	0	0	3	28	54	-26	0

	Malaysia	Malta	Norfolk Island	Northern Ireland
Malaysia	—	22–6	12–21	10–13
Malta	6–22	—	12–16	10–16
Norfolk Island	21–12	16–12	—	17–6
Northern Ireland	13–10	16–10	6–17	—

=== Section D ===
Rank	Nation	Athletes	MP	MW	MT	ML	FR	AG	PD	PTS
1	England	Sophie Tolchard, Jamie-Lea Winch, Natalie Chestney, Sian Honnor	3	3	0	0	60	32	+28	9
2	India	Lovely Choubey, Pinki Singh, Nayanmoni Saikia, Rupa Rani Tirkey	3	2	0	1	41	34	+7	6
3	Cook Islands	Emily Jim, Matapa Puia, Tiare Jim, Teokotai Jim	3	1	0	2	30	45	-15	3
4	Canada	Jennifer Macdonald, Jacqueline Foster, Leanne Chinery, Kelly McKerihen	3	0	0	3	34	54	-20	0

	Canada	Cook Islands	England	India
Canada	—	11–14	16–23	7–17
Cook Islands	14–11	—	7–19	9–15
England	23–16	19–7	—	18–9
India	17–7	15–9	9–18	—

== Knockout stage ==
Quarterfinals
A1	Fiji	15
C2	Northern Ireland	12
D1	England	11
B2	South Africa	12
B1	New Zealand	17
A2	Botswana	13
C1	Norfolk Island	9
D2	India	17

Semifinals
A1	Fiji	14
B2	South Africa	16
B1	New Zealand	13
D2	India	16

Final
B2	South Africa	10
D2	India	17
Third place
A1	Fiji	6
B1	New Zealand	17
