= Nicole Toomey =

New Zealand lawn bowler

Personal information
- Nationality: New Zealander
- Born: 29 January 1995 (age 31) Wellington, New Zealand

Sport
- Sport: Lawn bowls
- Club: Victoria Bowling Club, Wellington
Medal record
Lawn bowls
Representing New Zealand
Commonwealth Games
Bronze medal – third place	2022 Birmingham	fours
Bronze medal – third place	2022 Birmingham	triples

Nicole Toomey (born 29 January 1995) is a New Zealand international lawn bowler.

== Bowls career ==
In 2021 Toomey won the New Zealand national single bowls title and was also named Bowls New Zealand Emerging Player of the Year (Female).

Toomey has been selected to represent New Zealand at the 2022 Commonwealth Games in Birmingham. She competed in the women's triples and the Women's fours at the Games. In both the triples and fours she secured a bronze medal.
