= Janice Bell =

American lawn bowler

Personal information
- Nationality: American
- Born: 25 January 19?? Scotland

Sport
- Club: Oakland LBC
Medal record
Representing United States
Asia Pacific Bowls Championships
Silver medal – second place	2015 Christchurch	fours
Atlantic Bowls Championships
Bronze medal – third place	2011 Paphos	pairs
Bronze medal – third place	2011 Paphos	fours

Janice Bell is a Scottish-born American lawn bowls international.

== Bowls career ==
=== World Championship ===
Bell competed at the 2016 World Outdoor Bowls Championship in Christchurch and four years later in 2020, was selected for the 2020 World Outdoor Bowls Championship in Australia but the event was cancelled due to the COVID-19 pandemic.

In 2023, she was selected as part of the team to represent the United States at the 2023 World Outdoor Bowls Championship. She participated in the women's pairs and the women's fours events.

=== Asia Pacific ===
Bell won a fours silver medal at the 2015 Asia Pacific Bowls Championships in Christchurch.

=== Atlantic Championships ===
In 2011, she won the pairs and fours bronze medals at the Atlantic Bowls Championships.
