= Pinki Singh (bowls) =

Indian lawn bowler (born 1980)

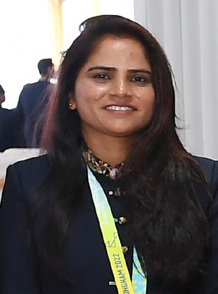
- Singh in August 2022

Personal information
- Full name: Pinki Kaushik Singh
- Nationality: Indian
- Born: 14 August 1980 (age 46) Delhi, India
Medal record
Women's lawn bowls
Representing India
Commonwealth Games
Gold medal – first place	2022 Birmingham	fours
Asia Pacific Bowls Championships
Bronze medal – third place	2009 Kuala Lumpur	fours
Asian Lawn Bowls Championship
Bronze medal – third place	2014 Shenzhen	triples
Silver medal – second place	2016 Brunei	triples
Bronze medal – third place	2016 Brunei	fours
Gold medal – first place	2017 New Delhi	triples
Gold medal – first place	2023 Kuala Lumpur	fours
Gold medal – first place	2025 Clark	triples

Pinki Kaushik Singh (born 14 August 1980) is an Indian women's international lawn bowler.

== Bowls career ==
=== World Championships ===
Pinki was selected by the Indian national team, to represent them at the sport's blue riband event, the 2023 World Bowls Championship. She participated in the women's triples and the women's fours events.

=== Commonwealth Games ===
Pinki has represented India at four Commonwealth Games; in the triples at the 2010 Commonwealth Games, in the pairs and fours at the 2014 Commonwealth Games, in the singles and triples at the 2018 Commonwealth Games and in the triples and fours at the 2022 Commonwealth Games. In the 2022 competition, she was part of the Women's fours Indian team, along with (Lovely Choubey, Nayanmoni Saikia and Rupa Rani Tirkey) which won Gold beating South Africa in the final, 17–10.

=== Asia Pacific Championships ===
Pinki has won a bronze medal at the 2009 Asia Pacific Bowls Championships.

=== Asian Championships ===
In the Asian Lawn Bowls Championship, Pinki has won bronze medal in women's triples in 2014, silver in women's triples and bronze in women's fours in 2016, and gold in women's triples in 2017.

In 2023, she won the fours gold medal at the 14th Asian Lawn Bowls Championship in Kuala Lumpur. In 2025 she won a gold medal in the triples at the 16th Asian Lawn Bowls Championship in Clark City, Philippines.

== Awards ==
She was conferred the Arjuna Award for 2023.
