= Nur Ain Nabilah Tarmizi =

Malaysian lawn bowler (born 1998)

Personal information
- Nationality: Malaysian
- Born: 2 March 1998 (age 28) Malaysia

Sport
- Sport: Lawn bowls

Achievements and titles
- Highest world ranking: 15 (February 2026)
Medal record
Representing Malaysia
World Outdoor Championships
Gold medal – first place	2023 Gold Coast	pairs
Commonwealth Games
Silver medal – second place	2022 Birmingham	triples
Southeast Asian Games
Gold medal – first place	2017 Kuala Lumpur	fours
Gold medal – first place	2019 Philippines	fours
Asian Lawn Bowls Championship
Gold medal – first place	2024 Pattaya	fours
Gold medal – first place	2025 Clark	pairs

Nur Ain Nabilah Tarmizi (born 2 March 1998) is a Malaysian international lawn bowler. She is a Southeast Asian Games double gold medalist and has represented Malaysia at the Commonwealth Games winning a silver medal. She reached a career high ranking of world number 15 in February 2026.

== Biography ==
She has twice won the gold medal at the Lawn bowls at the Southeast Asian Games, in 2017 and 2019 in the fours event.

In 2022, she was selected for the 2022 Commonwealth Games in Birmingham, where she competed in the men's pairs triples and the women's fours event. In the triples, the team of Tarmizi, Syafiqa Haidar Afif Abdul Rahman and Azlina Arshad secured a silver medal but lost the final to England.

In 2023, she was selected by the Malaysian national team, to represent them at the sport's blue riband event, the 2023 World Bowls Championship. She participated in the women's triples and the women's fours events. The Malaysian team ranked seventh in the world at the start of the tournament, were given the target of reaching the semi finals. In the pairs partnering Aleena Nawawi, she reached the final against Malta, where she won the gold medal after winning 15–11.

Tarmizi won the gold medal in the fours at the 15th Asian Lawn Bowls Championship, held in Pattaya, Thailand, during March 2024. In 2025 she won a gold medal in the pairs at the 16th Asian Lawn Bowls Championship in Clark City, Philippines.

== Honours ==
=== Honours of Malaysia ===
- Malaysia :
  - Member of the Order of the Defender of the Realm (AMN) (2024)
