= Alyani Jamil =

Malaysian international lawn bowler (born 1993)

Personal information
- Nationality: Malaysian
- Born: 20 June 1993 (age 33) Malaysia

Achievements and titles
- Highest world ranking: 3 (November 2025)
Medal record
Representing Malaysia
Asia Pacific Bowls Championships
Silver medal – second place	2019 Gold Coast	triples
Silver medal – second place	2019 Gold Coast	fours
Bowls World Cup
Bronze medal – third place	2025 Kuala Lumpur	singles
Southeast Asian Games
Gold medal – first place	2017 Kuala Lumpur	fourss
Gold medal – first place	2019 Philippines	pairs
Asian Lawn Bowls Championship
Gold medal – first place	2023 Kuala Lumpur	singles
Gold medal – first place	2023 Kuala Lumpur	triples
Gold medal – first place	2025 Clark	singles

Nurul Alyani Binti Jamil (born 1993) is a Malaysian international lawn bowler. She reached a career high ranking of world number 3 in November 2025.

== Bowls career ==
=== World Championships ===
In 2020, Jamil was selected for the 2020 World Outdoor Bowls Championship in Australia, which resulted in cancellation following the COVID-19 pandemic.

Jamil was selected by the Malaysian national team, to represent them at the sport's blue riband event, the 2023 World Bowls Championship. She participated in the women's pairs and the women's singles events. The Malaysian team ranked seventh in the world at the start of the tournament, were given the target of reaching the semi finals.

=== World Singles Champion of Champions ===
Jamil was runner-up to Jo Edwards in the 2018 World Singles Champion of Champions.

=== Other events ===
Jamil won two silver medals at the 2019 Asia Pacific Bowls Championships in the Gold Coast, Queensland in the triples and fours and won two gold medals in the fours (2017) and pairs (2019) in the Lawn bowls at the Southeast Asian Games.

In 2023, Jamil won the singles and triples gold medals at the 14th Asian Lawn Bowls Championship in Kuala Lumpur. In 2025, Jamil won a gold medal in the singles at the 16th Asian Lawn Bowls Championship in Clark City, Philippines.
