= Lawn bowls at the 2017 SEA Games =

Lawn bowls event

- Venue: National Lawn Bowls Centre
- Location: Kuala Lumpur, Malaysia
- Date: 22–27 August 2017

The lawn bowls competitions at the 2017 Southeast Asian Games in Kuala Lumpur were held at National Lawn Bowls Centre.

== Medal table ==
* Host nation (Malaysia)

Rank	Nation	Gold	Silver	Bronze	Total
1	Malaysia (MAS)*	7	1	0	8
2	Philippines (PHI)	1	3	2	6
3	Brunei (BRU)	0	3	1	4
4	Singapore (SGP)	0	1	1	2
5	Thailand (THA)	0	0	4	4
Totals (5 entries)		8	8	8	24

== Medalists ==
=== Men ===
Event	Gold	Silver	Bronze
Singles	Soufi Rusli; Malaysia	Lee Yuan Min; Singapore	Elmer Abatayo; Philippines
Pairs	Malaysia; Fairul Izwan Abd Muin; Muhammad Hizlee Abdul Rais	Philippines; Pancho Marcelito; Angelo Morales	Thailand; Naret Aiangetuen; Sonthi Manakitpaiboon
Triples	Malaysia; Fairus Jabal; Syamil Syazwan Ramli; Mohd Amir Mohd Yusof	Brunei; Ampuan Ahad Ampuan Kasim; Haji Naim Brahim; Pg Haji Tengah Pg Haji Tejudin	Thailand; Wattana Kadkhunthod; Anan Naksaray; Thanakrit Thammasarn
Fours	Philippines; Curte Robert Guarin; Emmanuel Portacio; Leo Carreon; Ronald Lising	Malaysia; Daeng Dhadyry Dahasry; Izzat Dzulkeple; Safuan Said; Zulhilmie Redzuan	Thailand; Anuruk Rodmanee; Chalit Yingyong; Patawee Montien; Uthen Ontong

=== Women ===
Event	Gold	Silver	Bronze
Singles	Emma Firyana Saroji; Malaysia	Amalia Matali; Brunei	Tham Mee Kim; Singapore
Pairs	Malaysia; Auni Fathiah Kamis; Siti Zalina Ahmad	Brunei; Dk Nurul Nabilah; Esmawandy Brahim	Philippines; Sonia Bruce; Ainie Knight
Triples	Malaysia; Azlina Arshad; Noorazlinda Zakaria; Zuraini Khalid	Philippines; Ronalyn Greenlees; Rosita Bradborn; Hazel Jagonoy	Brunei; Ajijah Muntol; Norafizah Matossen; Suhana Md Daud
Fours	Malaysia; Nur Fidrah Noh; Nor Hashimah Ismail; Alyani Jamil; Nur Ain Nabilah Tarmizi	Philippines; Marisa Baronda; Nancy Toyco; Nenita Tabiano; Sharon Hauters	Thailand; Chamaipron Kotchawong; Kritsana Namthaisong; Palita Gangur; Patsorn Bryant

== See also ==
- Boccia at the 2017 ASEAN Para Games
- Pétanque at the 2017 Southeast Asian Games
