= Haji Naim Brahim =

Bruneian lawn bowler

Personal information
- Born: 23 April 1948 (age 78) Brunei-Muara District, Brunei
Medal record
Representing (Brunei)
Southeast Asian Games
Silver medal – second place	1999 Bandar Seri Begawan	pairs
Silver medal – second place	2001 Kuala Lumpur	pairs
Gold medal – first place	2005 Angeles City	triples
Gold medal – first place	2007 Nakhon Ratchasima	singles
Silver medal – second place	2017 Kuala Lumpur	triples
Asian Lawn Bowls Championship
Gold medal – first place	2005 Kuala Lumpur	singles
Gold medal – first place	2007 Kuala Lumpur	pairs

Haji Naim Brahim (born 23 April 1948) is an international lawn bowler from Brunei.

== Bowls career ==
=== Commonwealth Games ===
Brahim has represented Brunei at six Commonwealth Games; he participated in the singles at the 1994 Commonwealth Games, the pairs at the 1998 Commonwealth Games and the 2002 Commonwealth Games, the singles at the 2006 Commonwealth Games, the pairs at the 2000 Commonwealth Games and the triples event and fours event at the 2018 Commonwealth Games.

=== World Championships ===
Brahim has been selected to represent Brunei at the World Bowls Championship on three occasions in 2008 (singles and pairs), 2012 (triples and fours) and 2016 (triples and fours).

=== Southeast Asian Games ===
He has also won two gold medals in Lawn bowls at the Southeast Asian Games (2005 and 2007) and ten years later won a silver medal in the triples at the 2017 Southeast Asian Games.

=== Asian Championships ===
He has won two gold medals at the Asian Lawn Bowls Championship.
