= Emmanuel Portacio =

Filipino lawn bowler (1969–2022)

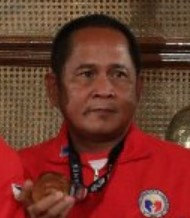
- Portacio in 2017

Personal information
- Nationality: Filipino
- Born: 11 December 1969
- Died: 7 April 2022 (aged 52)
Medal record
Representing (Philippines)
Southeast Asian Games
| Bronze medal – third place | 2007 Nakhon Ratchasima | triples |
| Gold medal – first place | 2017 Kuala Lumpur | fours |
| Bronze medal – third place | 2019 Philippines | fours |

Emmanuel Portacio (11 December 1969 – 7 April 2022) was a Filipino international lawn bowler.

== Bowls career ==
In 2017, Portacio won the gold medal in the fours event at the 2017 Southeast Asian Games in Kuala Lumpur. His fours team consisted of Curte Robert Guarin, Leo Carreon and Ronald Lising.
