= Bethan Russ =

Welsh international lawn bowler

Personal information
- Nationality: British (Welsh)

Sport
- Sport: Lawn bowls
- Club: Port Talbot BC (outdoors)
Medal record
Representing Wales
Atlantic Bowls Championships
Gold medal – first place	2019 Cardiff	fours
European Championships
Gold medal – first place	2017 Jersey	mixed four
Welsh Nationals
Gold medal – first place	2024	singles

Bethan Russ is a Welsh international lawn bowler.

== Bowls career ==
In 2017, Russ won a gold medal in the mixed four at the 11th European Bowls Championships.

In 2019, she won the fours gold medal at the Atlantic Bowls Championships

In 2023, she was selected as part of the team to represent Wales at the 2023 World Outdoor Bowls Championship. She participated in the women's triples and the women's fours events. In the fours, her team reached the quarter final before being beaten by England.

In 2024, Russ won the Welsh National Bowls Championships women's singles title.
