= Rupa Rani Tirkey =

Indian lawn bowler (born 1987)

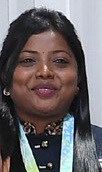

Personal information
- Nationality: Indian
- Born: 27 September 1987 (age 38) Ranchi, Jharkhand, India

Sport
- Sport: lawn bowls
- Coached by: Madhukant Patak

Achievements and titles
- Highest world ranking: 44 (August 2026)
Medal record
Representing India
Commonwealth Games
Gold medal – first place	2022 Birmingham	fours
Asia Pacific Bowls Championships
Bronze medal – third place	2009 Kuala Lumpur	triples
Bronze medal – third place	2009 Kuala Lumpur	fours
Bronze medal – third place	2019 Gold Coast	triples
Asian Lawn Bowls Championship
Gold medal – first place	2009 Shenzhen	fours
Bronze medal – third place	2014 Shenzhen	triples
Silver medal – second place	2016 Brunei	triples
Bronze medal – third place	2016 Brunei	fours
Gold medal – first place	2023 Kuala Lumpur	fours
Gold medal – first place	2025 Clark	triples

Rupa Rani Tirkey (born 27 September 1987) is an Indian women's international lawn bowler. She reached a career high ranking of world number 44 in August 2026.

== Bowls career ==
=== World Championships ===
In 2020, she was selected for the 2020 World Outdoor Bowls Championship in Australia, which resulted in cancellation following the COVID-19 pandemic. She was selected by the Indian national team, to represent them at the sport's blue riband event, the 2023 World Bowls Championship. She participated in the women's triples and the women's fours events.

=== Commonwealth Games ===
Tirkey has represented India at four Commonwealth Games in the triples at the 2010 Commonwealth Games, the triples and fours at the 2014 Commonwealth Games, in the pairs and fours at the 2018 Commonwealth Games and in the triples and fours at the 2022 Commonwealth Games. In the 2018 competition the Women's fours won section B and just failed out on winning a medal after losing to Malta in the quarter finals. In the 2022 competition, she was part of the Women's fours Indian team, along with (Lovely Choubey, Pinki Singh and Nayanmoni Saikia) which won the gold medal beating South Africa in the final, 17-10.

=== Asia Pacific Championships ===
Tirkey has won three medals at the Asia Pacific Bowls Championships; the latest medal success was a bronze medal at the 2019 Asia Pacific Bowls Championships in the Gold Coast, Queensland.

=== Asian Championships ===
In the Asian Lawn Bowls Championship, Tirkey has won bronze medal in women's triples in 2014 followed by silver in women's triples and bronze in women's fours, both in 2016.

In 2023, she won the fours gold medal at the 14th Asian Lawn Bowls Championship in Kuala Lumpur. In 2025 she won a gold medal in the triples at the 16th Asian Lawn Bowls Championship in Clark City, Philippines.
