= Zuraini Khalid =

Personal information
- Nationality: Malaysian
- Born: 30 January 1987 (age 39)
Medal record
Representing Malaysia
World Outdoor Championships
Silver medal – second place	2012 Adelaide	Women's fours
Commonwealth Games
Silver medal – second place	2010 Delhi	Women's pairs
Southeast Asian Games
Gold medal – first place	2017 Kuala Lumpur	triples

Zuraini Khalid is a Malaysian female international lawn bowler.

== Bowls career ==
Khalid won a silver medal in the women's pairs (with Nor Hashimah Ismail) at the 2010 Commonwealth Games in Delhi. Two years later she won another silver medal but this time at the 2012 World Outdoor Bowls Championship, in the fours event with (Auni Fathiah Kamis, Nur Fidrah Noh and Azlina Arshad) which was held in Adelaide, Australia.

In 2016, she won the Hong Kong International Bowls Classic singles title and finished runner up in the pairs and in 2017, won a gold medal in the Lawn bowls at the Southeast Asian Games.
