= 2023 World Outdoor Bowls Championship – Women's Pairs =

Bowls competition

2023 World Outdoor Bowls Championships – Women's pairs
- 14th World Outdoor Bowls Championships
- Location: Gold Coast, Australia
- Date: 29 August to 10 September
- Category: World Bowls Championship

The 2023 World Outdoor Bowls Championship – Women's pairs will be the 14th edition of the World Championships to be held on the Gold Coast in Queensland, Australia from 29 August to 10 September. There will be five venues; the Broadbeach Bowls Club, Musgrave Hill Bowls Club, Club Helensvale, Paradise Point Club and Mudgeraba Club.

The women's pairs is one of eight events that will determine the 2023 world champions.

== Section tables ==
=== Section 1 ===
Team	Player	P	W	D	L	Shots	Pts
1	(Norfolk Island) Carmen Anderson & Shae Wilson	7	7	0	0	68	21
2	(Wales) Sara Nicholls & Ysie White	7	5	1	1	42	16
3	(South Africa) Francesca Baleri & Colleen Piketh	7	4	1	2	71	13
4	(United States) Anne Nunes & Janice Bell	7	4	0	3	28	12
5	(Thailand) Orawan Sodok & Palita Gangur	7	3	0	4	21	9
6	(Singapore) Sarah Ho Shu En & Philomena Goh Quee Kee	7	3	0	4	17	9
7	(Turkey) Busranur Uzun & AT Atalay	7	1	0	6	-165	3
8	(France) Olivia Four & Cindy Royet	7	0	0	7	-82	0

=== Section 2 ===
Team	Player	P	W	D	L	Shots	Pts
1	(New Zealand) Selina Goddard & Katelyn Inch	7	6	0	1	95	18
2	Ashleigh Rainey & Sarah Kelly	7	6	0	1	41	18
3	(Philippines) Marisa Baronda & Rosita Bradborn	7	5	0	2	75	15
4	(Guernsey) Rose Ogier & Lucy Beere	7	5	0	2	61	15
5	(Namibia) Bianca Lewis & Diana Viljoen	7	3	0	4	2	9
6	(Argentina) Laucila Bausili & Ana Ramos	7	2	0	5	-78	6
7	(Papua New Guinea) Klesha Walo & May Osamae	7	1	0	6	-94	3
8	(Niue) Catherine Papani & Pilena Motufoou	7	0	0	7	-102	0

=== Section 3 ===
Team	Player	P	W	D	L	Shots	Pts
1	(Malaysia) Ain Nabilah Tarmizi & Aleena Nawawi	7	5	0	2	62	15
2	(Scotland) Emma McIntyre & Claire Anderson	7	5	0	2	34	15
3	(India) Lovely Choubey & Nayanmoni Saikia	7	4	1	2	33	13
4	(Cook Islands) Emily Jim & Tiare Jim	7	4	0	3	-8	12
5	(Canada) Jordan Kos & Kelly McKerihen	7	3	1	3	6	10
6	(Botswana) Lesedi Millicent Mafoko & Lephai Marea Modutlwa	7	3	0	4	-51	9
7	(Jersey) Kim Hutchings & Rachel MacDonald	7	2	1	4	-17	7
8	(Macau) Chan Wai Kun & Tam Sim Fong	7	0	1	6	-59	1
9	(Kenya) Jedidiah Njeri Maina & Eunice Wambui Mbugua	withdrew					

=== Section 4 ===
Team	Player	P	W	D	L	Shots	Pts
1	(England) Sophie Tolchard & Amy Pharaoh	8	7	0	1	84	21
2	(Malta) Rebecca Rixon & Connie-Leigh Rixon	8	6	1	1	69	19
3	(Australia) Kristina Krstic & Ellen Ryan	8	6	0	2	75	18
4	(Zimbabwe) Caryn Sinclair & Jane Rigby	8	4	1	3	-42	13
5	(Hong Kong) Angel So & Helen Cheung	8	3	0	5	6	9
6	(Fiji) Elizabeth Moceiwai & Losalini Diqoya	8	3	0	5	-47	9
7	(Netherlands) Elly Dolieslager & Ineke Spangenberg	8	3	0	5	-55	9
8	(Switzerland) Marianne Kunzle & Laura Butler	8	1	1	6	-24	4
9	(Japan) Sayuri Abiru & Keiko Kurohara	8	1	1	6	-66	4

== Finals ==
Play Offs
(Norfolk Island) Norfolk Islands	9
Malta	20
England	17
Wales	14
New Zealand	16
Scotland	17
Malaysia	16
Ireland	14

Semifinals
Malta	20
England	7
Scotland	10
Malaysia	17

Gold medal
Malta	11
Malaysia	15

== Results ==
Women's pairs section 1
Round 1 (4 Sep)		
Wales	France	21–10
Norfolk Island	Turkey	42–5
United States	South Africa	18–21
Thailand	Singapore	15–18
Round 2 (5 Sep)		
Wales	South Africa	20–20
Norfolk Island	France	20–7
Singapore	Turkey	26–6
Thailand	United States	12–17
Round 3 (5 Sep)		
South Africa	France	20–6
Norfolk Island	Singapore	19–17
Wales	Thailand	18–17
Turkey	United States	6–28
Round 4 (5 Sep)		
France	Singapore	4–26
South Africa	Thailand	9–16
Norfolk Island	United States	16–14
Wales	Turkey	34–10
Round 5 (6 Sep)		
France	Thailand	8–23
Singapore	United States	13–15
South Africa	Turkey	54–5
Wales	Norfolk Island	14–17
Round 6 (6 Sep)		
United States	France	19–14
Thailand	Turkey	25–10
Singapore	Wales	12–20
South Africa	Norfolk Island	13–17
Round 7 (6 Sep)		
Turkey	France	17–15
United States	Wales	18–19
Thailand	Norfolk Island	13–20
Singapore	South Africa	8–24

Women's pairs section 2
Round 1 (4 Sep)		
New Zealand	Papua New Guinea	37–4
Philippines	Argentina	34–4
Guernsey	Ireland	14–22
Niue	Namibia	10–24
Round 2 (5 Sep)		
New Zealand	Ireland	16–15
Philippines	Papua New Guinea	28–4
Namibia	Argentina	24–13
Niue	Guernsey	12–30
Round 3 (5 Sep)		
Ireland	Papua New Guinea	24–14
Philippines	Namibia	23–9
New Zealand	Niue	31–4
Argentina	Guernsey	11–25
Round 4 (5 Sep)		
Papua New Guinea	Namibia	11–27
Ireland	Niue	15–14
Philippines	Guernsey	17–24
New Zealand	Argentina	39–7
Round 5 (6 Sep)		
Papua New Guinea	Niue	31–8
Namibia	Guernsey	11–23
Ireland	Argentina	18–11
New Zealand	Philippines	11–16
Round 6 (6 Sep)		
Guernsey	Papua New Guinea	28–9
Niue	Argentina	13–14
Namibia	New Zealand	10–16
Ireland	Philippines	20–11
Round 7 (7 Sep)		
Argentina	Papua New Guinea	23–8
Guernsey	New Zealand	15–16
Niue	Philippines	9–27
Namibia	Ireland	12–19

Women's pairs section 3
Round 1 (4 Sep)		
Malaysia	Jersey	29–10
Scotland	Botswana	22–13
India	Canada	17–17
Cook Islands	Kenya	+
Round 2 (5 Sep)		
Kenya	Canada	+
Malaysia	India	18–20
Scotland	Jersey	13–19
Macau	Botswana	9–22
Round 3 (5 Sep)		
Macau	Malaysia	12–18
Botswana	Canada	14–23
Jersey	Cook Islands	16–17
India	Kenya	+
Round 4 (5 Sep)		
Cook Islands	India	20–10
Canada	Jersey	22–16
Botswana	Malaysia	6–35
Scotland	Macau	21–8
Round 5 (6 Sep)		
Canada	Scotland	10–21
Cook Islands	Macau	18–17
Kenya	Botswana	+
Jersey	India	17–13
Round 6 (6 Sep)		
Jersey	Kenya	+
Botswana	Cook Islands	17–9
Macau	Canada	11–23
Malaysia	Scotland	12–15
Round 7 (6 Sep)		
Malaysia	Cook Islands	19–15
Scotland	Kenya	+
India	Macau	27–13
Botswana	Jersey	13–12
Round 8 (7 Sep)		
Scotland	Cook Islands	21–12
Malaysia	Canada	20–11
Kenya	Macau	+
India	Botswana	34–8
Round 9 (7 Sep)		
Kenya	Malaysia	+
Cook Islands	Canada	14–13
Macau	Jersey	15–15
India	Scotland	17–12

Women's pairs section 4
Round 1 (5 Sep)		
England	Zimbabwe	31–7
Australia	Japan	23–7
Switzerland	Netherlands	8–14
Fiji	Hong Kong	7–26
Round 2 (5 Sep)		
Fiji	Netherlands	21–20
Australia	Switzerland	18–16
England	Japan	21–9
Malta	Zimbabwe	18–18
Round 3 (5 Sep)		
Malta	Australia	19–10
Zimbabwe	Netherlands	16–22
Japan	Hong Kong	15–10
Switzerland	Fiji	13–18
Round 4 (6 Sep)		
Hong Kong	Switzerland	20–13
Netherlands	Japan	20–11
Zimbabwe	Australia	7–30
England	Malta	17–13
Round 5 (6 Sep)		
Netherlands	England	5–30
Hong Kong	Malta	10–22
Fiji	Zimbabwe	16–19
Japan	Switzerland	16–16
Round 6 (6 Sep)		
Japan	Fiji	10–21
Zimbabwe	Hong Kong	15–12
Malta	Netherlands	28–10
Australia	England	12–17
Round 7 (7 Sep)		
Australia	Hong Kong	17–15
England	Fiji	15–8
Switzerland	Malta	15–18
Zimbabwe	Japan	17–14
Round 8 (7 Sep)		
England	Hong Kong	17–9
Australia	Netherlands	30–8
Fiji	Malta	10–21
Switzerland	Zimbabwe	15–17
Round 9 (7 Sep)		
Malta	Japan	28–8
Switzerland	England	13–12
Fiji	Australia	5–29
Hong Kong	Netherlands	21–11

+forfeited
