= Fairul Izwan Abd Muin =

Malaysian lawn bowler

Fairul Izwan Abdul Muin
Personal information
- Nationality: Malaysian
- Born: 3 November 1982 (age 43) Selangor, Malaysia
- Height: 5 ft 11 in (180 cm)
- Weight: 85 kg (187 lb)
Medal record
Representing Malaysia
Men's lawn bowls
World Outdoor Championships
Bronze medal – third place	2008 Christchurch	Men's pairs
Bronze medal – third place	2008 Christchurch	Men's team
Commonwealth Games
Silver medal – second place	2014 Glasgow	Men's pairs
Bronze medal – third place	2010 Delhi	Men's pairs
Asia Pacific Bowls Championships
Silver medal – second place	2003 Brisbane	pairs
Bronze medal – third place	2003 Brisbane	triples
Bronze medal – third place	2003 Brisbane	fours
Gold medal – first place	2005 Melbourne	pairs
Gold medal – first place	2009 Kuala Lumpur	fours
Bronze medal – third place	2009 Kuala Lumpur	fours
Silver medal – second place	2015 Christchurch	pairs
Bronze medal – third place	2015 Christchurch	fours
Bronze medal – third place	2019 Gold Coast	fours
Bronze medal – third place	2019 Gold Coast	fours
Southeast Asian Games
Gold medal – first place	2005 Angeles City	pairs
Gold medal – first place	2007 Nakhon Ratchasima	triples
Gold medal – first place	2017 Kuala Lumpur	pairs
Gold medal – first place	2019 Philippines	fours

Fairul Izwan Abdul Muin (born 3 November 1982) is a Malaysian lawn bowler.

== Bowls career ==
=== World Championships ===
Muin won a pairs bronze medal at the 2008 World Outdoor Bowls Championship in Christchurch, New Zealand. In 2020 he was selected for the 2020 World Outdoor Bowls Championship in Australia.

=== Commonwealth Games ===
Muin competed in both the men's fours and the men's pairs events at the 2014 Commonwealth Games. He narrowly missed out on a medal in the men's fours event, coming in fourth place, but won a silver medal in the men's pairs Four years earlier he had won a bronze medal in the pairs at the 2010 Commonwealth Games in Delhi.

In 2022, he competed in the men's singles and the men's pairs at the 2022 Commonwealth Games.

=== Asia Pacific ===
Muin has won ten medals at the Asia Pacific Bowls Championships, a silver pairs and bronze fours in 2003, a gold pairs in 2005 in the pairs with Safuan Said, a gold fours and bronze pairs in 2009, and a silver pairs and bronze fours in 2015. His ninth and tenth medals was a pairs bronze and fours bronze at the 2019 Asia Pacific Bowls Championships in the Gold Coast, Queensland.

=== Southeast Asian Games ===
Muin has also won four gold medals in Lawn bowls at the Southeast Asian Games, a pairs gold at the 2005 Southeast Asian Games and triples in 2007 Southeast Asian Games, a gold in pairs at the 2017 Southeast Asian Games and a gold in Fours at the 2019 Southeast Asian Games.
