= Soufi Rusli =

Malaysian bowls player (born 1987)

Personal information
- Full name: Muhammad Soufi Rusli
- Nationality: Malaysian
- Born: 23 October 1987 (age 38) Kuala Lumpur, Malaysia
- Height: 171 cm (5 ft 7 in)
- Weight: 75 kg (165 lb)

Sport
- Sport: Bowls

Achievements and titles
- Highest world ranking: 19 (November 2025)
Medal record
Bowls
Representing Malaysia
Commonwealth Games
Bronze medal – third place	2026 Glasgow	pairs
World Cup Singles
Silver medal – second place	2017 Warilla	Men's singles
Asia Pacific Bowls Championships
Bronze medal – third place	2011 Adelaide	fours
Bronze medal – third place	2015 Christchurch	fours
Bronze medal – third place	2019 Gold Coast	triples
Bronze medal – third place	2019 Gold Coast	fours
Southeast Asian Games
Gold medal – first place	2017 Kuala Lumpur	singles
Asian Lawn Bowls Championship
Gold medal – first place	2024 Pattaya	triples
Gold medal – first place	2025 Clark	pairs
Gold medal – first place	2025 Clark	fours

Muhammad Soufi bin Rusli is an Malaysian international bowls player. He won a bronze medal in the men's pairs at the 2026 Commonwealth Games.

== Bowls career ==
=== World Championships ===
Rusli was selected by the Malaysian national team, to represent them at the sport's blue riband event, the 2023 World Bowls Championship. He participated in the men's triples and the men's fours events. The Malaysian team ranked seventh in the world at the start of the tournament, were given the target of reaching the semi finals. In the triples, his team reached the quarter final before losing to Ireland.

=== Commonwealth Games ===
Rusli represented Malaysia in the singles and triples at the 2018 Commonwealth Games; he reached the quarter-finals of the singles. In 2022, he competed in the men's triples and the men's fours at the 2022 Commonwealth Games.

At the 2026 Commonwealth Games, he combined with Amirul D Rahim to win the bronze medal in the men's pairs.

=== World Cup Singles ===
He won the silver medal at the 2017 World Cup Singles losing to Jeremy Henry in the final.

=== Other events ===
Rusli has won four medals at the Asia Pacific Bowls Championships; the latest medals being a double bronze medal at the 2019 Asia Pacific Bowls Championships in the Gold Coast, Queensland. He also won a gold medal at the Lawn bowls at the 2017 Southeast Asian Games in the singles.

Rusli won the gold medal in the triples at the 15th Asian Lawn Bowls Championship, held in Pattaya, Thailand, during March 2024 and the pairs and fours golds at the 16th Asian Lawn Bowls Championship in Clark City, Philippines during 2025.
