= Songsin Tsao =

Thai lawn bowler

Personal information
- Nationality: Thai
Medal record
Representing (Thailand)
Asia Pacific Bowls Championships
Silver medal – second place	2009 Kuala Lumpur	singles
Southeast Asian Games
Gold medal – first place	2005 Angeles City	singles
Gold medal – first place	2007 Nakhon Ratchasima	singles

Songsin Tsao (Thai: ทรงศิลป์ เชาว์) is an international lawn bowler from Thailand.

== Bowls career ==
Tsao has won two singles gold medals at the Lawn bowls at the Southeast Asian Games.

She won a singles silver medal at the 2009 Asia Pacific Bowls Championships, held in Kuala Lumpur. Tsao was selected as part of the five woman team by Thailand for the 2012 World Outdoor Bowls Championship, which was held in Adelaide, Australia.

In 2017, she won the Hong Kong International Bowls Classic pairs title with Jintana Visanuvimol.
