= Siti Zalina Ahmad =

Malaysian lawn bowler (born 1979)

Personal information
- Nationality: Malaysian
- Born: 2 June 1979 (age 47) Perak, Malaysia
Medal record
Representing Malaysia
World Outdoor Championships
Bronze medal – third place	2008 Christchurch	singles
Bronze medal – third place	2008 Christchurch	team
World Cup Singles
Gold medal – first place	2015 Warilla	singles
Silver medal – second place	2016 Warilla	singles
Bronze medal – third place	2019 Warilla	singles
World Champion of Champions
Silver medal – second place	2007 Warilla	singles
Commonwealth Games
Bronze medal – third place	1998 Kuala Lumpur	fours
Gold medal – first place	2002 Manchester	singles
Gold medal – first place	2006 Melbourne	singles
Gold medal – first place	2018 Gold Coast	pairs
Bronze medal – third place	2022 Birmingham	singles
Asia Pacific Bowls Championships
Gold medal – first place	2003 Brisbane	pairs
Silver medal – second place	2005 Melbourne	singles
Bronze medal – third place	2007 Christchurch	singles
Bronze medal – third place	2009 Kuala Lumpur	singles
Gold medal – first place	2009 Kuala Lumpur	pairs
Gold medal – first place	2011 Adelaide	singles
Bronze medal – third place	2011 Adelaide	pairs
Bronze medal – third place	2015 Christchurch	singles
Silver medal – second place	2015 Christchurch	pairs
Bronze medal – third place	2019 Gold Coast	singles
Bronze medal – third place	2019 Gold Coast	pairs
Southeast Asian Games
Gold medal – first place	1999 Bandar Seri Begawan	pairs
Gold medal – first place	2017 Kuala Lumpur	pairs
Gold medal – first place	2019 Philippines	fours
Asian Lawn Bowls Championship
Gold medal – first place	2003 Kuala Lumpur	singles
Gold medal – first place	2005 Kuala Lumpur	singles
Gold medal – first place	2008 Shenzhen	singles
Gold medal – first place	2008 Shenzhen	pairs
Gold medal – first place	2016 Brunei	singles
Gold medal – first place	2016 Brunei	pairs
Gold medal – first place	2017 New Delhi	singles
Gold medal – first place	2017 New Delhi	pairs
Gold medal – first place	2018 Xinxiang	pairs
Gold medal – first place	2018 Xinxiang	fours

Siti Zalina Ahmad (born 2 June 1979) is a Malaysian international lawn bowler.

== Bowls career ==
Siti Zalina Ahmad is from Perak, in Malaysia and is one of only two women to have won two Commonwealth Games singles gold medals. After watching a game of hockey in 1995 she saw a lawn bowls match and decided to take up the sport.

=== Commonwealth Games ===
The first title came in 2002 when she won the Commonwealth Games Singles Gold medal in Manchester and four years later she successfully defended her title winning the Commonwealth Games Singles Gold medal in Melbourne.

In the 2010 Commonwealth Games she won her qualifying group with a perfect 10–0 win record and 20-0 set record before losing to Natalie Melmore in the semi-finals bringing her eight-year reign as champion to an end. She was also the flag bearer for the Malaysian team during the 2010 games.

She was selected as part of the Malaysian team for the 2018 Commonwealth Games on the Gold Coast in Queensland where she claimed a gold medal in the Pairs with Emma Firyana Saroji.

In 2022, she competed in the women's singles and the women's pairs at the 2022 Commonwealth Games. In the singles she secured a bronze medal.

=== World Championship ===
Zalina has also won one world championship medal, a bronze at the 2008 World Outdoor Bowls Championship in Christchurch, New Zealand. In 2020 she was selected for the 2020 World Outdoor Bowls Championship in Australia.

=== International ===
Zalina has won eleven medals at the Asia Pacific Bowls Championships, including three gold medals and a double bronze at the 2019 Asia Pacific Bowls Championships in the Gold Coast, Queensland. She has also won three titles at the Hong Kong International Bowls Classic, consisting of the 2014 and 2018 singles title and the 2008 pairs title with Nor Hashimah Ismail.

In the Southeast Asian Games she has won three gold medals.

=== National ===
She also won the 2008 singles title at the New Zealand National Bowls Championships when bowling as an overseas invitational player.

== Personal life ==
Her occupation is a Police Officer and is nicknamed Lina.
