= Jane Rigby (bowls) =

Zimbabwean lawn bowler

Personal information
- Nationality: Zimbabwean
Medal record
Representing (Zimbabwe)
World Singles Champion of Champions
Silver medal – second place	2012 Cyprus	singles
African States Tournament
Gold medal – first place	2023	singles

Jane Rigby is a Zimbabwean international lawn bowler.

== Bowls career ==
Rigby has represented Zimbabwe at the Commonwealth Games, in the singles event at the 2002 Commonwealth Games.

She won the silver medal at the 2012 World Singles Champion of Champions in Paphos, Cyprus.

She was selected by the Zimbabwe team to represent them at the African States Tournament in June 2023, in Namibia, where she won the gold medal in the singles.

In 2023, she was selected as part of the team to represent Zimbabwe at the sport's blue riband event, the 2023 World Outdoor Bowls Championship. She participated in the women's singles and the women's pairs events.
