= Syamil Syazwan Ramli =

Malaysian international lawn bowler (born 1988)

Personal information
- Nationality: Malaysian
- Born: 14 November 1988 (age 37)

Sport
- Sport: Bowls
Medal record
Representing Malaysia
Southeast Asian Games
Gold medal – first place	2017 Kuala Lumpur	triples
Gold medal – first place	2019 Philippines	triples

Mohammad Syamil Syazwan Ramli (born 1988) is a Malaysian international lawn bowler.

== Bowls career ==
In 2016 Ramli represented Malaysia at the 2016 World Outdoor Bowls Championship and two years later the 2018 Commonwealth Games. He has won two gold medals in the triples at the Lawn bowls at the 2017 Southeast Asian Games and the Lawn bowls at the 2019 Southeast Asian Games.

In 2020, he was selected for the 2020 World Outdoor Bowls Championship in Australia. In 2022, he competed in the men's triples and the men's fours at the 2022 Commonwealth Games.
