= Syafiqa Haidar Afif Abdul Rahman =

Malaysian lawn bowler (born 1994)

Personal information
- Nationality: Malaysian
- Born: 24 January 1994 (age 32) Malaysia

Sport
- Sport: Lawn bowls

Achievements and titles
- Highest world ranking: 12 (August 2026)
Medal record
Representing Malaysia
Commonwealth Games
Silver medal – second place	2022 Birmingham	triples
Silver medal – second place	2026 Glasgow	pairs
Southeast Asian Games
Gold medal – first place	2019 Philippines	fours
Asian Lawn Bowls Championship
Gold medal – first place	2023 Kuala Lumpur	triples
Gold medal – first place	2024 Pattaya	fours

Syafiqa Haidar Afif Abdul Rahman (born 24 January 1994) is a Malaysian international lawn bowler. She is a Southeast Asian Games gold medalist and has represented Malaysia at the Commonwealth Games winning two silver medals. She reached a highest world ranking of number 12 in August 2026.

== Biography ==
She has won the gold medal at the Lawn bowls at the Southeast Asian Games, in 2019 in the fours event.

In 2022, she was selected for the 2022 Commonwealth Games in Birmingham, where she competed in the men's pairs triples and the women's fours event. In the triples, the team of Abdul Rahman, Nur Ain Nabilah Tarmizi and Azlina Arshad secured a silver medal but lost the final to England. Also in 2023, she won the triples gold medals at the 14th Asian Lawn Bowls Championship in Kuala Lumpur.

In 2023, she was selected by the Malaysian national team, to represent them at the sport's blue riband event, the 2023 World Bowls Championship. She participated in the women's triples and the women's fours events. The Malaysian team ranked seventh in the world at the start of the tournament, were given the target of reaching the semi finals.

Rahman won the gold medal in the fours at the 15th Asian Lawn Bowls Championship, held in Pattaya, Thailand, during March 2024.

Playing with Aleena Nawawi, she won the silver medal in the women's pairs at the 2026 Commonwealth Games in Glasgow, Scotland, losing to England's Sian Honnor and Amy Pharaoh in the final.
