= Auni Fathiah Kamis =

Malaysian lawn bowler

Personal information
- Nationality: Malaysian
- Born: 11 July 1991 (age 34)
Medal record
Representing Malaysia
World Outdoor Championships
Silver medal – second place	2012 Adelaide	fours
Asia Pacific Bowls Championships
Silver medal – second place	2019 Gold Coast	triples
Silver medal – second place	2019 Gold Coast	fours
Southeast Asian Games
Gold medal – first place	2017 Kuala Lumpur	pairs

Auni Fathiah Binti Kamis is a Malaysian international lawn bowler.

== Bowls career ==
=== World Championship ===
Kamis won a silver medal in the fours at the 2012 World Outdoor Bowls Championship in Adelaide.

=== Other events ===
Kamis won two silver medals at the 2019 Asia Pacific Bowls Championships in the Gold Coast, Queensland in the triples and fours and has won a gold medal in the pairs in the Lawn bowls at the Southeast Asian Games.
