= Azlina Arshad =

Malaysian international lawn bowler

Personal information
- Nationality: Malaysian
- Born: 26 August 1981 (age 44) Pulau Pinang, Malaysia
- Height: 5 ft 1 in (155 cm)
- Weight: 78 kg (172 lb)
Medal record
Representing Malaysia
World Outdoor Championships
Bronze medal – third place	2008 Christchurch	fours
Bronze medal – third place	2008 Christchurch	team
Silver medal – second place	2012 Adelaide	fours
Bronze medal – third place	2016 Christchurch	triples
Commonwealth Games
Gold medal – first place	2006 Glasgow	triples
Silver medal – second place	2014 Glasgow	fours
Silver medal – second place	2022 Birmingham	triples
Asia Pacific Bowls Championships
Gold medal – first place	2003 Brisbane	triples
Silver medal – second place	2003 Brisbane	fours
Silver medal – second place	2005 Melbourne	triples
Gold medal – first place	2007 Christchurch	triples
Silver medal – second place	2007 Christchurch	fours
Gold medal – first place	2009 Kuala Lumpur	triples
Gold medal – first place	2009 Kuala Lumpur	fours
Bronze medal – third place	2015 Christchurch	fours
Silver medal – second place	2019 Gold Coast	triples
Silver medal – second place	2019 Gold Coast	fours
Southeast Asian Games
Gold medal – first place	2005 Angeles City	triples
Gold medal – first place	2007 Nakhon Ratchasima	pairs
Gold medal – first place	2017 Kuala Lumpur	triples
Asian Lawn Bowls Championship
Gold medal – first place	2003 Kuala Lumpur	fours
Gold medal – first place	2005 Kuala Lumpur	fours
Gold medal – first place	2017 New Delhi	fours
Gold medal – first place	2018 Xinxiang	fours
Gold medal – first place	2023 Kuala Lumpur	triples

Azlina Arshad (born 26 August 1981) is a Malaysian international lawn bowler.

== World Championship ==
Arshad has won three World Championship medals; a bronze medal in the fours at the 2008 World Outdoor Bowls Championship in Christchurch, New Zealand, a silver medal in the fours at the 2012 World Outdoor Bowls Championship in Adelaide and in 2016, a bronze medal with Nor Hashimah Ismail and Nur Fidrah Noh in the triples at the 2016 World Outdoor Bowls Championship in Christchurch. In 2020 she was selected for the 2020 World Outdoor Bowls Championship in Australia, which resulted in cancellation following the COVID-19 pandemic.

In 2023, she was selected by the Malaysian national team, to represent them at the sport's blue riband event, the 2023 World Bowls Championship. She participated in the women's triples and the women's fours events. The Malaysian team ranked seventh in the world at the start of the tournament, were given the target of reaching the semi finals.

== Commonwealth Games ==
Azlina won a gold medal at the 2006 Commonwealth Games in the women's triples. Eight years later she competed in both the women's triples and women's fours events at the 2014 Commonwealth Games. She failed to qualify from the group stages in the women's triples event but won a silver medal in the women's fours.

In 2022, she competed in the women's triples and the Women's fours at the 2022 Commonwealth Games. She won the silver medal in the triples with Syafiqa Haidar Afif Abdul Rahman and Nur Ain Nabilah Tarmizi.

== Asia Pacific Championships ==
Arshad has won eleven Asia Pacific Bowls Championships medals. Included in the haul of medals is four gold medals and a double silver at the 2019 Asia Pacific Bowls Championships in the Gold Coast, Queensland in the triples and fours.

== Southeast Asian Games ==
Arshad has won three gold medals in the pairs and triples (twice) at the Lawn bowls at the Southeast Asian Games.

== Asian Championships ==
In 2023, she won the triples gold medals at the 14th Asian Lawn Bowls Championship in Kuala Lumpur.
