= Lawn bowls at the SEA Games =

International lawn bowling competition

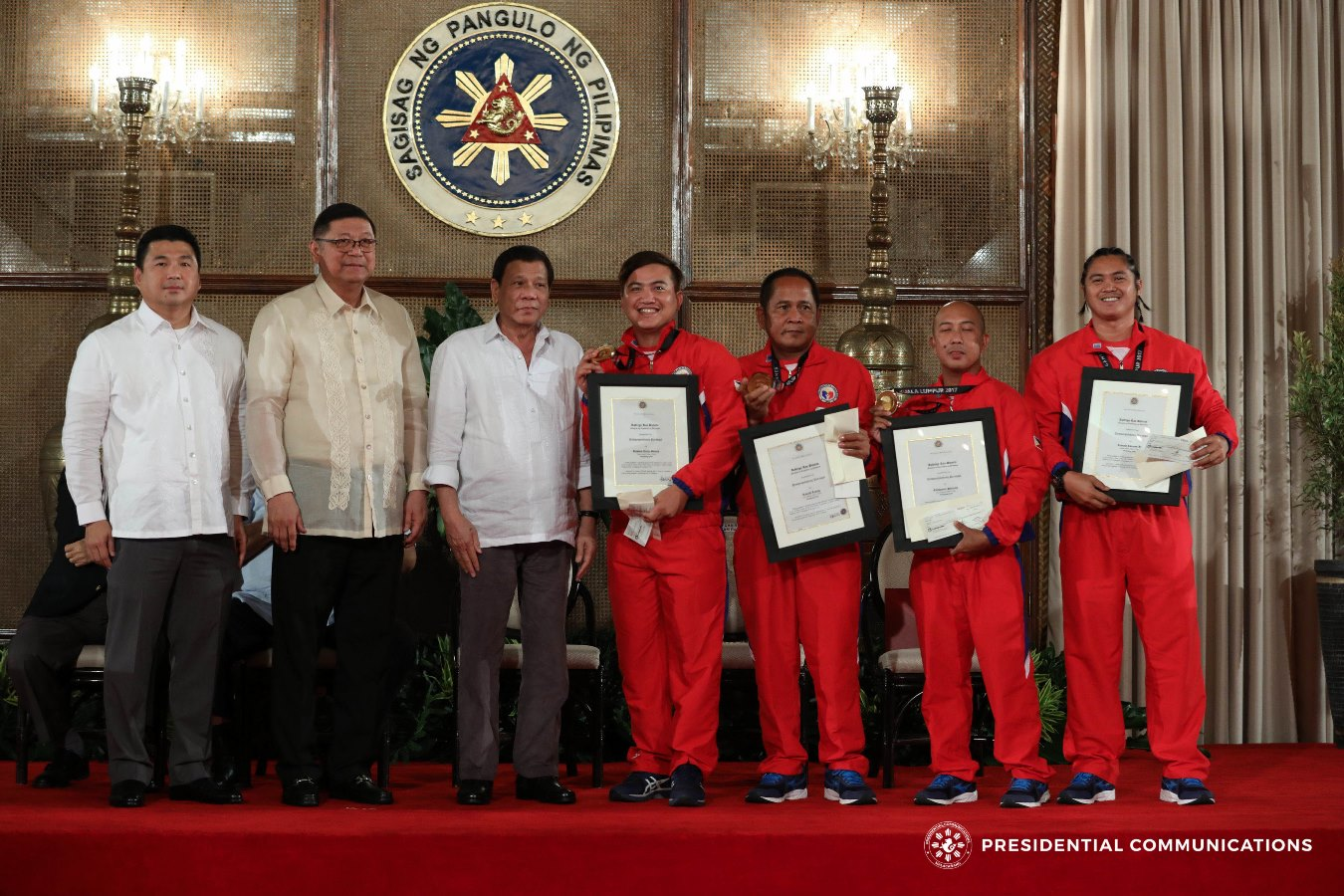
- Men's fours champions, the Philippines in 2017

Tournament information
- Sport: Lawn bowls
- Location: Various
- Established: 1999
- Administrator: Southeast Asian Games Federation

Lawn bowls at the Southeast Asian Games is a lawn bowls competition (normally held every two years) between national bowls organisations in Southeast Asia. It is one of the sports that form the Southeast Asian Games.

== Past winners ==
=== Men ===
| Year | Singles | Pairs | Triples | Fours |
|---|---|---|---|---|
| 1999 | (Brunei); Pengiran Tengah Tajuddin | (Malaysia); Ibrahim Jusoh; Mohamed Tazman Tahir | not held | (Malaysia); Firdaus Ghuas; Jozaini Johari; Zuraidi Puteh; Sazeli Sani |
| 2001 | (Malaysia); Syed Mohamad Syed Akil | (Malaysia); Mohamed Tazman Tahir; Sazeli Sani | not held | (Malaysia); Aziz Maswadi; Mohd Aidf Daud; Ibrahim Jusoh; Shalhuddin Wahab |
| 2005 | (Philippines); Ronald Lising | (Malaysia); Fairul Izwan Abd Muin; Safuan Said | (Brunei); Salleh Chuchu Tuah; Haji Naim Brahim; Lokman Mohammad Salleh | not held |
| 2007 | (Brunei); Haji Naim Brahim | (Malaysia); Azim Azami Ariffin; Mohd Amir Mohd Yusof | (Malaysia); Fairul Izwan Abd Muin; Azwan Shuhaimi; Zulhilmie Redzuan | not held |
| 2017 | (Malaysia); Soufi Rusli | (Malaysia); Fairul Izwan Abd Muin; Muhammad Hizlee Abdul Rais | (Malaysia); Fairus Jabal; Syamil Syazwan Ramli; Mohd Amir Mohd Yusof | (Philippines); Curte Robert Guarin; Emmanuel Portacio; Leo Carreon; Ronald Lising |
| 2019 | not held | (Philippines); Rodel Labayo; Angelo Morales | (Malaysia); Izzat Dzulkeple; Fairus Jabal; Syamil Syazwan Ramli | (Malaysia); Idham Amin Ramlan; Daeng Dhadyry Dahasry; Zulhilmie Redzuan; Fairul Izwan Abd Muin |
| 2023 | | | | |

=== Women ===
| Year | Singles | Pairs | Triples | Fours |
|---|---|---|---|---|
| 1999 | (Singapore); Rosemary Tessensohn | (Malaysia); Siti Zalina Ahmad; Nor Hashimah Ismail | not held | (Malaysia); Nor Azwa Mohamed Di; Siti Hawa Ali; Bah Chu Mei; Haslah Hassan |
| 2001 | (Thailand); Songsin Faithakam | (Malaysia); Nor Hashimah Ismail; Sarimah Abu Bakar | not held | (Malaysia); Nazura Ngahat; Rosnah Abu; Haslah Hassan; Bah Chu Mei |
| 2005 | (Thailand); Songsin Tsao | (Malaysia); Bah Chu Mei; Haslah Hassan | (Malaysia); Nor Iryani Azmi; Azlina Arshad; Nor Hashimah Ismail | not held |
| 2007 | (Thailand); Songsin Tsao | (Malaysia); Azlina Arshad; Emma Firyana Saroji | (Malaysia); Maisarah Aminludin; Nur Fidrah Noh; Nor Hashimah Ismail | not held |
| 2017 | (Malaysia); Emma Firyana Saroji | (Malaysia); Auni Fathiah Kamis; Siti Zalina Ahmad | (Malaysia); Azlina Arshad; Noorazlinda Zakaria; Zuraini Khalid | (Malaysia); Nur Fidrah Noh; Nor Hashimah Ismail; Alyani Jamil; Nur Ain Nabilah Tarmizi |
| 2019 | not held | (Malaysia); Alyani Jamil; Emma Firyana Saroji | (Singapore); Lim Poh Eng; Goh Quee Kee; Shermeen Lim | (Malaysia); Afiqah Dayana Budiman; Nur Ain Nabilah Tarmizi; Syafiqa Haidar Afif Abdul Rahman; Siti Zalina Ahmad |
| 2023 | | | | |

== See also ==
- World Bowls Events
