= Clark Freeport and Special Economic Zone =

Clark
- Freeport and special economic zone
- Clark Freeport and Special Economic Zone
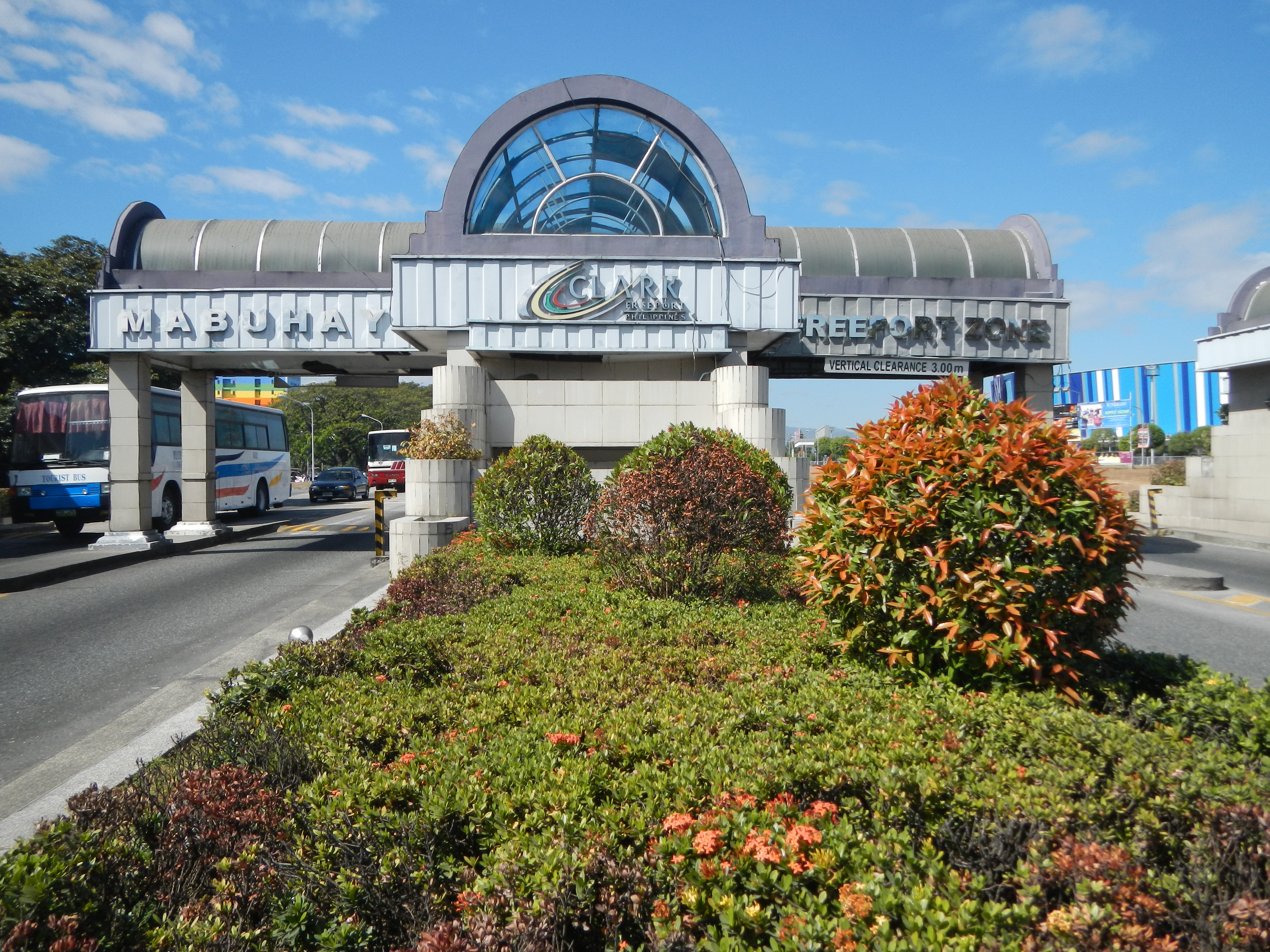
- Main gate of the Clark Freeport Zone in Angeles City

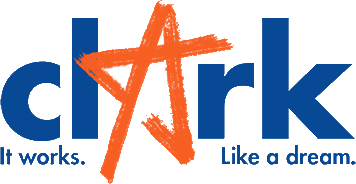
- Logo
- Motto: Clark: It works. Like a dream.
- Location of Clark Pampanga and Tarlac
- Interactive map of Clark
- Location in Luzon Location in the Philippines
- Coordinates: 15°11′06″N 120°32′22″E
- Country: Philippines
- Region: Central Luzon
- Provinces: Pampanga and Tarlac
- Cities and municipalities (portions): Pampanga: Angeles; Mabalacat; Porac; Tarlac: Bamban; Capas
- Managing entity: Clark Development Corporation
- Established: April 3, 1993

Area
  - Total: 320.6 km^{2} (123.8 sq mi)
- Time zone: UTC+8 (PST)
- Catholic diocese: Roman Catholic Archdiocese of San Fernando (Pampanga); Roman Catholic Diocese of Tarlac (Tarlac)
- Website: www.visitclark.com and www.clark.com.ph

Clark, officially named as the Clark Freeport and Special Economic Zone, is an area in Central Luzon, Philippines that is designated as a freeport and a special economic zone by the Philippine Economic Zone Authority. It covers the cities and municipalities of Angeles, Mabalacat, and Porac in the province of Pampanga, as well as Capas and Bamban in Tarlac and is anchored by the Clark International Airport, New Clark City, and Clark Global City developments. The area is managed by state-owned Clark Development Corporation.

Originally anchored on the Clark Air Base which was controlled by the United States Air Force until 1991, most of the air base has now been converted into a civilian airport, with some portions now under the Philippine Air Force. Clark serves as economic, sporting, and aviation center of Central Luzon. It is one of the regions that hosted the 2019 SEA Games.

== History ==
=== Establishment of the Clark Special Economic Zone ===
The Bases Conversion and Development Act of 1992 (Republic Act 7227) authorized the President to issue a decree converting the military reservation in the Clark area covering Angeles City, Mabalacat, and Porac, Pampanga and Capas, Tarlac into a special economic zone. The legislation also created the Bases Conversion and Development Authority (BCDA) to facilitate the conversion process.

President Fidel V. Ramos issued Proclamation No. 163 on April 3, 1993, creating the Clark Special Economic Zone (CSEZ) and transferring the administration of the area to the BCDA. The proclamation included the Clark Air Base and portions of the Clark reverted base lands not reserved for military use to the CSEZ. The Clark Development Corporation, a subsidiary of BCDA was founded to oversee the development of the area in the same year. The Metro Clark Advisory Council (MCAC) was also formed shortly as a mechanism for the CDC to coordinate with local government units in the area.

The following year, President Ramos declared Clark as the future site of a "premier" civilian international airport with a 14-million passenger capacity by 1998 but this plan did not come to fruition as projected.

On June 14, 1996, the CSEZ was expanded with the addition of the Sacobia area, which includes lands from Mabalacat, Pampanga and Bamban, Tarlac, through Ramos' Proclamation No. 805.

The CSEZ was placed under the Philippine Economic Zone Authority on March 10, 2006, by President Gloria Macapagal Arroyo through Proclamation No. 1035, granting tax and duty exemptions to export company locators operating within the CSEZ. The Clark economic zone lost these exemptions in 2005 after a Supreme Court ruling that these exemptions under the BCDA charter are exclusive to the Subic economic zone.

=== Creation of the Freeport Zone ===
The Clark Air Base area, also known as the Clark Main Zone, was declared a Freeport Zone and was separated from the special economic zone through Republic Act 9400 of 2007.

Since then the Freeport Zone and the Clark Special Economic Zone were considered as separate areas but collectively they are occasionally referred to as the "Clark Freeport and Special Economic Zone".

=== Further reorganization ===
In November 2018, the BCDA and the Clark Development Corporation grouped four developments within the CFEZ namely the Clark Freeport Zone, Clark Global City, Clark International Airport, and New Clark City as "districts" under one brand dubbed as "Clark: It Works. Like A Dream". Six years later, it was announced that the planned central business district is set to rise in the area as Clark Central Business District and it will create more than 170,000 jobs.

== Demographics ==
Population of areas in Clark
City/Municipality	Population (2024)
Angeles City	483,452
Bamban	81,012
Capas	162,724
Mabalacat	306,594
Porac	147,551
Total	1,181,333

== See also ==
- History of Clark Air Base
- Clark Veterans Cemetery
- Clark Parade Grounds
