= Australia Indoor Bowls Championships =

Tournament information
- Sport: Indoor bowls
- Established: men (1988) women (2003)
- Website: Bowls Australia

The Australian Indoor Championships is an annual tournament organised by Bowls Australia and held in separate singles events between men and women bowlers from the constituent states and territories of Australia. The tournament takes place at Tweed Heads Bowls Club on the border of New South Wales and Queensland.

Previously the respective champions went on to represent Australia in the World Cup Singles event, but now qualify for entry to the annual World Bowls Indoor Championships.

== History ==
The men's singles event started in 1988, with the women's singles added for the first time in 2003. The championships have always been held at the Tweed Heads Bowls Club.

The first men's singles champion was Commonwealth Games medallist Denis Dalton from New South Wales in 1988, while Queensland's Di Cunnington claimed the inaugural women's title in 2003.

== Format ==
The men's and women's tournaments are run as 32-player knockout draws with matches of two sets of nine ends, and a three-end tie-break if required. Eight players in each draw are seeded, with the defending champion seeded first.

The quantity of participants qualified from each state and territory is determined by Bowls Australia, and berths are contested at a series of regional qualifying events prior to the championships.

== Men's Singles Champions ==
Year	State	Champion (club)	State	Runner-up (club)	Score	Ref
1988	NSW	Denis Dalton ( - )	-	-	-	
1989	QLD	Alex Mathews ( - )	-	-	-	
1990	NSW	Rex Johnston ( - ) (1/2)	-	-	-	
1991	QLD	Trevor Morris ( - )	-	-	-	
1992	WA	Dennis Katunarich ( - )	-	-	-	
1993	SA	Ian Taylor ( - )	-	-	-	
1994	QLD	Steve Glasson ( - ) (1/9)	-	-	-	
1995	QLD	Ian Schuback ( - ) (1/2)	-	-	-	
1996	QLD	Ian Schuback ( - ) (2/2)	-	-	-	
1997	QLD	Steve Glasson ( - ) (2/9)	-	-	-	
1998	QLD	Steve Glasson ( - ) (3/9)	-	-	-	
1999	QLD	Steve Glasson ( - ) (4/9)	-	-	-	
2000	NSW	Rex Johnston (2/2) ( - )	-	-	-	
2001	NSW	Steve Glasson (St Johns Park) (5/9)	QLD	Ray Glasser (Coolangatta)	-	
2002	QLD	Steve Glasson ( - ) (6/9)	QLD	Ray Glasser ( - )	-	
2003	QLD	Steve Glasson ( - ) (7/9)	-	-	-	
2004	QLD	Steve Glasson ( - ) (8/9)	-	-	-	
2005	QLD	Steve Glasson ( - ) (9/9)	QLD	Mark Casey ( - )	2-1 (12-4,1-10,2-0)	
2006	QLD	Kelvin Kerkow ( - ) (1/2)	-	-	-	
2007	QLD	Kelvin Kerkow ( - ) (2/2)	-	-	-	
2008	NSW	Leif Selby (Warilla)	-	-	-	
2009	QLD	Anthony Kiepe ( - )	-	-	-	
2010	QLD	Brett Wilkie (Club Helensvale)	QLD	Jamie Anderson (Capalaba)	1.5-0.5 (7-7,12-7)	
2011	NSW	Jeremy Henry (Warilla) (1/3)	WA	Lance Strahan (Cambridge)	2-1 (3-9,11-6,3-2)	
2012	QLD	Mark Casey (Club Helensvale)	NSW	Paul Girdler (Tweed Heads)	2-1 (6-4,8-13,3-2)	
2013	VIC	Tony Wood (Clayton)	TAS	Mark Nitz (Burnie)	2-0 (9-6,9-3)	
2014	NSW	David Holt (St Johns Park)	QLD	Brett Wilkie (Club Helensvale)	2-1 (9-6,4-7,2-1)	
2015	NSW	Jeremy Henry (Warilla) (2/3)	NSW	Paul Girdler (Tweed Heads)	2-1 (4-7,11-4,4-2)	
2016	NSW	Jeremy Henry (Warilla) (3/3)	VIC	Curtis Hanley (Melbourne)	2-0 (11-2,9-8)	
2017	NSW	David Ferguson (Engadine)	NSW	Jeremy Henry (Warilla)	2-1 (6-11,8-6,4-2)	
2018	NSW	Aaron Teys (Warilla)	WA	Clive Adams (Cambridge)	2-0 (8-5,9-5)	
2019	VIC	Robert Briglia (Middle Park)	NSW	Aaron Teys (Warilla)	2-1 (2-10,15-9,3-1)	
2020	no championship due to COVID-19					
2021	no championship due to COVID-19					
2022	QLD	Aron Sherriff (Broadbeach)	VIC	Dylan Fisher (Moonee Valley)	2-0 (10-3,7-6)	
2023	NSW	Ray Pearse (Taren Point)	VIC	Darren Gordon (Dunkeld)	2-0 (14-1,8-3)	
2024	NSW	Jack McShane (Merrylands)	NSW	Jeremy Henry (Warilla)	2-0 (8-7,8-4)	
2025	NSW	Corey Wedlock (Warilla)	NSW	Jack McShane (Merrylands)	2-1 (6-5,9-11,3-1)	

== Women's Singles Champions ==
Year	State	Champion (club)	State	Runner-up (club)	Score	Ref
2003	QLD	Di Cunnington ( - )	-	-	-	
2004	VIC	Claire Duke ( - )	-	-	-	
2005	NSW	Maria Rigby ( - )	QLD	Brenda Thompson (Ipswich)	2-0 (9-8,13-3)	
2006	VIC	Judy Nardella ( - )	-	-	-	
2007	NSW	Karen Murphy ( - ) (1/6)	QLD	Kelsey Cottrell ( - )	-	
2008	NSW	Karen Murphy ( - ) (2/6)	-	-	-	
2009	NSW	Karen Murphy ( - ) (3/6)	-	-	-	
2010	NSW	Katrina Wright ( - )	NSW	Arleen Jeffrey ( - )	2-1	
2011	NSW	Karen Murphy (Cabramatta) (4/6)	NSW	Vicki Turner (Warilla)	2-0 (11-2,12-3)	
2012	NSW	Karen Murphy (Cabramatta) (5/6)	NSW	Claire Duke (Cabramatta)	2-0 (9-3,11-6)	
2013	NSW	Karen Murphy (Cabramatta) (6/6)	QLD	Maria Rigby (Manly)	2-0 (10-4,10-4)	
2014	NSW	Jamie-Lee Worsnop (St Johns Park)	NSW	Kay Moran (Cabramatta)	1.5-0.5 (8-5,8-8)	
2015	VIC	Carla Odgers (Sunbury)	QLD	Lynsey Clarke (Club Helensvale)	2-1 (10-8,5-8,4-2)	
2016	NSW	Natasha Scott (Raymond Terrace)	TAS	Rebecca Van Asch (Invermay)	2-1 (6-8,8-6,2-1)	
2017	TAS	Rebecca Van Asch (Invermay) (1/2)	VIC	Kelly McKerihen (Clayton)	2-1 (9-4,5-7,4-2)	
2018	TAS	Rebecca Van Asch (Invermay) (2/2)	QLD	Chloe Stewart (Broadbeach)	2-1 (9-4,1-9,5-0)	
2019	NSW	Genevieve Delves (Raymond Terrace)	NSW	Karen Murphy (Cabramatta)	2-1 (0-10,10-3,5-0)	
2020	no championship due to COVID-19					
2021	no championship due to COVID-19					
2022	QLD	Kelsey Cottrell (Broadbeach) (1/3)	NSW	Brianna Smith (St Johns Park)	2-0 (8-5,7-1)	
2023	VIC	Samantha Atkinson (Richmond Union)	NSW	Reese Finn-Young (Merimbula Imlay)	2-0 (10-5,9-4)	
2024	QLD	Kelsey Cottrell (Club Helensvale) (2/3)	QLD	Chloe Stewart (Club Tweed)	2-1 (9-4,2-11,5-0)	
2025	QLD	Kelsey Cottrell (Club Helensvale) (3/3)	NSW	Dawn Hayman (St Johns Park)	2-0 (11-5,8-6)	
