= Australian National Bowls Championships =

Australian bowls event

Tournament information
- Sport: Lawn bowls
- Location: Australia
- Established: 1913
- Administrator: Bowls Australia
- Website: Bowls Australia

The Australian National Bowls Championships and the Australian Open are competitions in Australia for bowls. They are organised by Bowls Australia. Bowls dates back to 1845 in Australia but it was not until 1910, during the 1910 Carnival of Bowls, that South Australia proposed the formation of the Australian Bowling Council (consisting of the six states) which duly formed the following year in 1911. The first National Singles Championships were held in 1913, with each state holding the Championships in turn. The Championships were also known as the Carnival at one stage.

The Championships were not held for a twelve year period from 2005 until 2016 when the Australian Open effectively replaced the National Championships. They Nationals returned in 2017 at the Club Sapphire Merimbula but the Australian Open continued to be held and remains a significant national event.

The Championships were severely disrupted by the COVID-19 pandemic with the 2020 Championships held over until May 2021. When they eventually took place not all of the events could be completed due to further problems with the pandemic. The 2021 championships were finally held in April 2022.

== Australian National Championships ==
=== Men ===
Year	Singles	Pairs	Triples	Fours	Ref
1913	W E Sayers (Ballarat)	not held	not held	W Arnott; G A Chapman; J Yeo; Harry Moses	
1914	Louis Waxman (Armadale)	not held	not held	W A Hotchin; J C Stewart; S W Smith; L Waxman	
1915–1921 not held due to World War I					
1922	T A Williams (Ballarat)	not held	not held	T Alexander; A Alexander; A Fuller; T Lewis	
1923 not held					
1924	John Gustafson (Fremantle)	not held	not held	E J Whykes; T Young; W M Morgan; T A Williams	
1925 not held					
1926	Andy Oastler (Camberwell)	not held	not held	H Maidment; M B Wilson; C Wyett; W Miller	
1927	Frank Dobbie (City of Camberwell)	not held	not held	H P Walsh; S Solomon; J Puls; F W Hardham	
1928–1929 not held					
1930	A B Stanley (Moreland)	not held	not held	E Daley; G A Holmes; J A Ferguson; A B Stanley	
1931	Frank Dobbie (City of Camberwell)	not held	not held	W Bleach Jr. W A Hotchin; J C Blair; W Bleach Sr.	
1932–1933 not held					
1934	T Williams (South Park)	G L Jacobs; A U Alley (Composite)	not held	Harold Murray; G A Holmes; J A Ferguson; A B Stanley	
19351 not held					
1936	E W Walker (Oakleigh)	H W Brown; R T Harrison (Composite)	not held	J Murray; N F Daws; G L Jacobs; A U Alley	
1937 not held					
1938	Frank Livingstone (Onehunga)	Percy Hutton; Howard Mildren (South Park)	not held	Harold Murray; Aub Murray; Charlie McNeill; Tom Kinder	
1939–1946 not held due to World War II					
1947	Jack Petchell (Sturt)	J Bunce; T H Jackett (City of Hawthorn)	not held	C Hill; A Toose; H Carne; F Winn	
1948	Jack Gordon (Coorparoo)	A E C Treloar; M C Wood (Adelaide)	not held	F J Bleazby; W Jepson; C L P Lilburne; N F Daws	
1949	Glyn Bosisto (Victoria)	Bert Palm; W A Maughan (Bundaberg)	not held	John Cobley; James Cobley; Len Knight; Charles Cordaiy	
1950 not held					
1951	Glyn Bosisto (Auburn)	A E C Treloar; M C Wood (Adelaide)	not held	T H Jackett; R T Rundle; A C Davies; Glyn Bosisto	
1952	Glyn Bosisto (Auburn)	J D Blackwell; M P Bussau (Nhill)	not held	H Murrell; T R Salmond; H Rutherford; H Littler	
1953	Glyn Bosisto (Auburn)	David Long; John Bird (Ryde)	not held	Elgar Collins; Walter Maling; Charles Beck; Neville Green	
1954 not held					
1955	Charlie McNeill (Hamilton)	W J Truscott; Harry Snook (Composite)	not held	J D Robinson; L A Beasley; G K Hutton; W R Tate	
1956 not held					
1957	Albert Newton (City)	R L Davis; L A Fitzpatrick (Ballan)	not held	C Jackson; C Hoath; K Spry; Glyn Bosisto	
1958 not held					
1959	Keith Downie (Newcastle City)		not held	Wally Bourne; Bert Flugge; Laurie Poole; Keith Poole	
1960 not held					
1961	Ellis Crew (NSW)	J W West; Jim McCain (St George/Bexley)	not held	Bill Sneyd; S Carter; E McCarthy; Ron Marshall	
1962 not held					
1963	Ron Marshall (Queensland)	John Reynolds; Gus Bianchetto (NSW)	not held	Dave Downie; H Hill; S Owen; W Dart	
1964 not held					
1965	Noel Osborne (Taree)	John Slater; Alan Griffin (St George)	not held	Alan Crawford; Harry Beveridge; Keith Martin; Geoff Kelly	
1966 not held					
1967	Tom Eastall (Penguin, Tas)	Ron Soulsby; John Grant (Yarrawonga)	not held	Harry Lyon; Abe Corrall; Stan Lane; Mick Reynolds	
1968 not held					
1969	Martin Millsom (Footscray City)	Alan Smith; Albert Newton (City)	not held		
1970	Merv Davy (Queensland)	Bill Jackson (Gosford); Bob Pinkerton (Camden)	not held	Vic Hayes; R Morton; Peter Rheuben; Frank Soars	
1971 not held					
1972	Clive White (Queensland)	I Stanton; R Baird (Queensland)	not held	Stan Coomber; H Wyper; E Stewart; Keith Poole	
1973 not held					
1974	Colin Thorn (WA)	Ron Butler; Col Lindsay (WA)	not held	Tisha McIntosh; Barry Salter; Jim Woodward; Alan Freeman	
1975	Cec Liddell	Roy Souter (Wiseman Park); Phil Flynn (Illawarra)	not held	Tisha McIntosh; Barry Salter; Kenny Williams; Ken Woods	
1976 not held					
1977	Barrie Baxter (Queensland)	Robert Parrella; Brian Gillett (Queensland)	not held	Cecil Bransky; David Blumberg; Jim Hall; Reg Robinson	
1978 not held					
1979	Jim Yates (Moreland, Vic)	Robert Parrella; Brian Gillett	not held		
1980 not held					
1981	Jack Hosking (Victoria)	Wally Bonaguro; Keith Lindner (SA)	not held	Clarrie Watkins; Bob Bartlett; Sam Clough; Jim McDonnell	
1982 not held					
1983	Jack Christey (NSW)		not held	Peter Rheuben; Ivan Vlatko; Jim Hall; David Blumberg	
1984 not held					
1985		Dennis Katunarich	not held	Dennis Katunarich; Brian Katunarich; John Rainoldi; Paul Richards	
1986	Peter Lawson (Tasmania)	Dennis Katunarich; John Rainoldi (WA)	not held	Charlie Hayes	
1987	Terry Baldwin (Warilla, NSW)	Rex Johnston; Bruce Linton	not held		
1988	Ian Ross (Victoria)	Ian Schuback; Fred Diamond	not held	John Hurst; Ian Jarvis; Colin Gee; Harold Fisher	
1989 not held					
1990	Peter Rheuben		not held	Cameron Curtis	
1991			not held		
1992			not held		
1993			not held		
1994	John Noonan		not held		
1995			not held		
1996			not held		
1997			not held		
1998			not held		
1999			not held		
2000	Bill Cornehls		not held		
2001–2016 not held					
2017	Aron Sherriff	Anthony Kiepe; Des Cann Jr.	Sean Ingham; Kevin Anderson; Ryan Bester	Des Cann Jr. Matthew Lucas; Brett Wilkie; Nathan Rice	
2018	Ray Pearse	Jade Groenewege; Sean Baker	Alan Howard; Peter Balderson; Mitchell Mears	Jordan Yates; Darren Burgess; Jay Bye-Norris; Anthony Flapper	
2019	Matthew Baus	Jade Groenewege; Sean Baker	Josh Berry; Chris Herden; Ben Twist	Joshua Appleyard; Brad Johns; Robert Meadows; Lee Schraner	
2020	cancelled	Lee Schraner; Brad Marron<	Corey Wedlock; Gary Kelly; Brendan Aquilina	Aaron Teys; Corey Wedlock; Brendan Aquilina; Jamie Turner	
2021	Blake Nairn	Aron Sherriff; Sean Ingham	Nick Cahill; Barrie Lester; Aron Sherriff	Paul Sinden; Adam Graham; Anthony Einfeld; Mark Masel	
2022	Rob McMullen	Jack McShane; Shawn Thompson	Nino Vlahovic; Winston Brackley; Brett Mahoney	Jordan Yates; Paul Williamson; Brad Willoughby; Anthony Flapper	
2023	Cody Packer	Corey Wedlock; Gary Kelly	Roger Stevens; Dean Drummond; Peter Brown	Craig Donaldson; Mathew Pietersen; David Ferguson; Ben Twist	
2024	Jay Bye-Norris	Ben Winther; Brett Spurr	Andrew Evans; Jake Rynne; Kane Nelson	Tyler Pettigrew; Brad Piper; Cody Gerick; Kane Nelson	
2025	24-28 November				

Championships not held - 1915-21, 1913, 1925, 1928, 1929, 1932, 1933, 1935, 1937, 1939–46, 1950, 1954, 1956, 2001-2016

=== Women ===
Year	Singles	Pairs	Triples	Fours	Ref
1969	Mary Ormsby				
1986	Greta Fahey				
2017	Kylie Whitehead	Natasha Jones; Lynsey Clarke	Lynne Thompson; Genevieve Delves; Natasha Scott	Natasha Jones; Lynsey Clarke; Julie Keegan; Chloe Stewart	
2018	Carla Krizanic	Anne Johns; Kelsey Cottrell	Louise Cronin; Kate Walker; Katrina Wright	Laura Merz; Robyn O'Brien; Therese Hastings; Helen Morss	
2019	Chloe Stewart	Katelyn Inch; Julie Keegan	Val Hardy; Judy Beesley; Jo Martin	Erin Swatridge; Kay Moran; Jamie-Lee Worsnop; Ellen Ryan	
2020	cancelled	Genevieve Delves; Natasha Van Eldik	Kate Matthews; Genevieve Delves; Natasha Van Eldik	Isabella Lawson; Leigh Fortington; Maria Rigby; Ester Regan	
2021	Bolivia Millerick	Cassandra Millerick; Kelsey Cottrell	Rebecca Van Asch; Debra Lee; Jess McMullen	Claire Sanders; Laureen Smith; Anne Miles; Kylie Whitehead	
2022	Kelsey Cottrell	Sam Ferguson; Anne Johns	Kerry Andersen; Rhonda Prosser; Kaye Blackwell	Amanda Masters; Shaan Saunders; Shari Solly; Jennie Bruce	
2023	Jessie Cottell	Claire Turley; Lynsey Clarke	Kate Matthews; Genevieve Delves; Natasha Van Eldik	Jamie-Lee Worsnop; Ellen Falkner; Ellen Ryan; Karen Murphy	
2024	Kelly McKerihen	Natasha Russell; Dawn Hayman	Brenda Balchin; Brenda Thompson; Noelene Dutton	Helen Heal; Robyn O'Brien; Hailey Packer; Kristina Krstic	

== Australian Open ==
=== Men ===
Year	Singles	Pairs	Fours triples until 2014	Ref
2005	Shane Globits	Bill Cornehls; Michael Wilks	Bill Cornehls; Kevin Walsh; Michael Wilks	
2006	Russell Meyer	Mark Nitz; Mark Strochnetter	Alan Dove; Graham Edwards; Wayne Roberts	
2007	Robert Doody	Matthew Marchant; Greg Harlow	Brody Pitham; John Bezear; Shane Garvey	
2008	Leif Selby	Ryan Bester; Gary Lawson	Carl Healey; Trentan Healey; Scott Bateup	
2009	Brett Wilkie	Ian McMahon; Mark Casey	Mark Berghofer; Robbie Thompson; Mark Jacobsen	
2010	Aron Sherriff	Mervyn King; Stuart Airey	Paul Jopson; Ben Twist; Kurt Brown	
2011	Leif Selby	Neville Rodda; Lee Schraner	Nick McIntyre; Matthew Flapper; Ali Forsyth	
2012	Mark Casey	Leif Selby; Nathan Rice	Ray Lawerson; James Pearce; Alan Dove	
2013	Aaron Wilson	Russell Green Jnr; Dylan Fisher	Tony Crammond; Dave Caldwell; Peter Bobrige	
2014	Nathan Wilson	Andrew Rees; Brendon Baker	Simon Mitchell; Brodie Turner; Jon Dimopoulos; Michael Cronin	
2015	Aaron Teys	Robbie Wild; Sean Baker	Steven Dennis; Nathan Pedersen; Wayne Ruediger; Scott Thulborn	
2016	Aron Sherriff	Steven Dennis; Nathan Pedersen	Steven Dennis; Nathan Pedersen; Wayne Ruediger; Scott Thulborn	
2017	Nathan Pedersen	Josh Thornton; Barrie Lester	Ryan Burnett; Darren Burnett; Paul Foster; Alex Marshall	
2018	Ryan Bester	Chris Herden; Carl Healey	Ryan Burnett; Nathan Rice; Jeremy Henry; Alex Marshall	
2019	Aron Sherriff	Ray Pearse; Aron Sherriff	Bradley Lawson; Scott De Jongh; Jamie Anderson; Kurt Brown	
2020	cancelled due to COVID-19 pandemic			
2021	Aaron Wilson	Matt Johnstone; Cody Packer	Ray Pearse; Aaron Hewson; Ben Twist; David Ferguson	
2022	Aron Sherriff	Aaron Wilson; Ben Twist	Carl Healey; Wayne Ruediger; Nathan Pedersen; Gary Kelly	
2023	Aron Sherriff	Aaron Wilson; Ben Twist	Barrie Lester; Corey Wedlock; Aaron Teys; Aron Sherriff	
2024	Aron Sherriff	Joseph Clarke; Jack McShane	Ray Pearse; Peter Taylor; Gary Kelly; Carl Healey	
2025	Aron Sherriff	Corey Wedlock; Gary Kelly	Thor Shannon; Adam Wallace; Ollie Morrison; Jake Rynne	

=== Women ===
Year	Singles	Pairs	Fours triples until 2014	Ref
2005	Roma Dunn	Arleen Jeffrey; Maria Rigby	Brooke Edwards; Gayle Edwards; Jan Hurst	
2006	Julie Keegan	Margaret Fairbairn; Helen Bosisto	Katherine Hawes; Jean Baker; Catherine Popple	
2007	Siti Zalina Ahmad	Noi Tucker; Therese Hastings	Karin Wilkinson; Margaret Smith; Beth Quinlain	
2008	Katrina Wright	Linda Gardiner; Gail Waitai	Corinne Crouch; Kay Moran; Katrina Wright	
2009	Kelsey Cottrell	Lynsey Armitage; Karen Murphy	Kay Moran; Anne Johns; Karen Murphy	
2010	Joyce Lindores	Sharyn Renshaw; Therese Hastings	Clare McCaul; Jan Khan; Val Smith	
2011	Lisa Phillips	Kay Moran; Karen Murphy	Kelsey Cottrell; Anne Johns; Lynsey Armitage	
2012	Lynsey Armitage	Victoria Troster; Elise Cowan	Kelsey Cottrell; Anne Johns; Lynsey Armitage	
2013	Lisa Phillips	Kelsey Cottrell; Lynsey Armitage	Samantha Shannahan; Claire Turley; Lisa Phillips	
2014	Anne Johns	Emma Brown; Noelene Dutton	Anne Johns; Rebecca Van Asch; Kelsey Cottrell; Lynsey Clarke	
2015	Ellen Ryan	Emma Brown; Noelene Dutton	Samantha Noronha; Natalie Noronha; Carla Odgers; Natasha Scott	
2016	Natasha Scott	Anne Johns; Rebecca Van Asch	Tiffany Brodie; Amelia Bruggy; Georgia White; Chloe Stewart	
2017	Ellen Ryan	Ellen Ryan; Julie Keegan	Tiffany Brodie; Amelia Bruggy; Georgia White; Chloe Stewart	
2018	Rebecca Van Asch	Gayle Edwards; Brooke Edwards	Lindg Qu; Leeane Poulson; Dianne Strawbridge; Marilyn Emerton	
2019	Natasha Scott	Genevieve Delves; Dawn Hayman	Lynsey Clarke; Anne Johns; Kelsey Cottrell; Rebecca Van Asch	
2020	cancelled due to COVID-19 pandemic			
2021	Natasha Van Eldik	Lynsey Clarke; Kelsey Cottrell	Sam Ferguson; Anne Johns; Lynsey Clarke; Kelsey Cottrell	
2022	Kelsey Cottrell	Paris Baker; Olivia Bloomfield	Sam Ferguson; Rebecca Van Asch; Lynsey Clarke; Kelsey Cottrell	
2023	Cassandra Millerick	Genevieve Delves; Natasha Van Eldik	Olivia Cartwright; Laura Butler; Chloe Stewart; Katelyn Inch	
2024	Laura Butler	Ellen Fife; Kristina Krstic	Louise Cronan; Leanne Chinery; Emma Boyd; Kelly McKerihen	
2025	Dawn Hayman	Selina Goddard; Chloe Stewart	Lynsey Clarke; Anne Johns; Rebecca Van Asch; Kelsey Cottrell	
