= Bowls Premier League =

Australian bowls competition

- Formerly: Australian Premier League
- Sport: Bowls
- Founded: 2013
- No. of teams: 12
- Countries: Australia
- Most recent champion: Tweed Ospreys (BPL20)
- Most titles: Tweed Ospreys (5)
- Broadcasters: Fox Sports, Sky Sport
- Website: http://www.bowls.com.au/events-page/national-events/bowls-premier-league

The Bowls Premier League (BPL) is an annual bowls competition involving teams from around Australia. The competition was founded in 2013 as a way to popularise the sport by presenting in a modernised format, using the term "made-for-television" in its promotion. The competition features faster play, modified rules, colourful clothing and comprehensive television coverage.

The BPL was founded by Bowls Australia and was initially contested by teams from the five major Australian cities plus a New Zealand side and has since expanded to 12 clubs. The week-long event attracts a large number of Australia's best bowls players to compete, as well as several high-profile bowlers from overseas.

== History ==
The first edition of the competition was held in November, 2013 under the name Australian Premier League. The inaugural clubs were Adelaide Endurance, Brisbane Gold, Melbourne Roys, New Zealand Blackjacks, Perth Suns and Sydney Lions, with Brisbane winning the first title.

Two further teams – the Murray Steamers and the Gold Coast Hawks – joined the competition in 2014 to expand the competition to eight. The Murray Steamers defeated Adelaide Endurance in the final of the 2014 competition to be champions for the second running of the event.

In 2016, Bowls Australia announced there would be two tournaments held per year starting from 2017, with one event staged in Auckland in addition to the traditional event at Club Pine Rivers in Brisbane, Queensland. The competition also underwent a name change to reflect the inclusion of the New Zealand leg, renaming to Bowls Premier League.

The Australian leg of the BPL has always been held in November while the first edition of the New Zealand event was held in March.

Adelaide Endurance were replaced by Illawarra Gorillas in 2017.

BPL10 in 2019 marked a significant shift in the competition, as three teams - Gold Coast Hawks, Illawarra Gorillas and New Zealand Blackjacks - did not renew their licence. This opened the door to three new teams - Adelaide Pioneers, Melbourne Pulse and Tweed Heads Ospreys.

In February 2020, Moama Bowling Club hosted the first BPL outside of Brisbane and New Zealand, with the New Zealand version of the event heading to the Victoria-NSW border town until at least 2022.

BPL12, planned to be hosted by Club Pine Rivers in November 2020, was postponed due to COVID. Moama eventually hosted the event in February 2021, with Club Pine Rivers hosting BPL13 and BPL14 later the same year.

BPL14 was later moved to Moama and played in February 2022. The league expanded to 10 teams, dropping the Melbourne Roys and adding the Tasmania Tridents, Melbourne eXtreme and Gold Coast Hawks. The Murray Steamers changed their name to the Moama Steamers.

The event's exponential growth continued in November 2024, with Geelong Jets and Sydney Saints expanding the competition to 12 teams.

=== Event structure ===
Originally, BPL competitions began on a Thursday and ended on Sunday. That was eventually changed, with competitions beginning on a Tuesday, then a Monday, and ending on a Friday evening.

Each BPL competition runs over the course of five days at one venue in a double round-robin and finals (playoffs) system; this makes for a total of 22 rounds consisting of six matches in each round.

The first New Zealand edition of the competition in March, 2017 had its event held from Monday through to Thursday.

All five matches in the final round of each day, as well as the BPL Cup Final are televised on Fox Sports in Australia and Sky Sport in New Zealand, as well as through digital streaming platform Kayo. Bowls Australia also livestream round robin matches during the day via Facebook and YouTube, using their popular Rinkside Live service.

== Competition format ==
Each match consists of a two five-end sets, with a one-end tie-break played if required. The game format is pairs, with three bowls for each player per end. A team coach also has a substitute player at their disposal which must be used during the game, but only immediately preceding the delivery of a bowl by their team player. Every player in the team, including the sub, must bowl at least 12 bowls per game (previously nine, changed for BPL20). The team with that wins both sets, or one set and then the tie-break, is the winner.

Instead of spending time rolling the jack, as per normal competitions, the players place the mat and advise the marker the length of the jack they would like to play to. Players have a 30-second shot clock in which they must deliver their bowl from the time the jack is placed at the start of an end or once their opposition bowl has come to a rest. Teams can nominate one Power Play end per set, enabling teams to earn double the shots scored in that end.

=== Finals system ===
Each team plays each other twice during the competition. At the end of the double round-robin, the top five teams in the standings play off in the finals series.

If teams on the ladder are equal on points they will be split on net total shots (shots for minus shots against).

The finals series includes straight eliminations and double-chance matches. It is similar to a four-team Page playoff system tournament, but with the addition of an elimination round between fourth and fifth place to move on to the standard Page bracket.

Finals Series Format
Match	Teams	Notes
Elimination Final 1	4th place team vs 5th place team	Winning team advances to Elimination Final 2. Losing team is eliminated.
Elimination Final 2	3rd place team vs Winner of Elimination Final 1	Winning team advances to Preliminary Final. Losing team is eliminated.
Semi Final	1st place team vs 2nd place team	Winning team advances to the Grand Final. Losing team advances to the Preliminary Final.
Preliminary Final	Winner of Elimination Final 2 vs Loser of Semi Final	Winning team advances to the Grand Final. Losing team is eliminated.
Grand Final	Winner of Semi Final vs Winner of Preliminary Final	Winner is the Event Champion.

=== Prizemoney ===
The BPL competition carries more than $100,000 in prize-money, with the winning franchise collecting $28,000.

== Franchises ==
The Bowls Premier League expanded to 12 teams for BPL14, held at the Moama Bowling Club.

=== Current franchises ===
Team name	Colours	Location	Region/State/Territory	Franchise owner	First season	Titles	Last title	Notes
Adelaide Pioneers		Adelaide	South Australia	Adelaide Bowling Club	BPL10			
Geelong Jets		Geelong	Victoria	Ocean Grove Bowling Club	BPL20			New BPL franchise
Gold Coast Hawks		Helensvale	Queensland	Club Helensvale	APL02	2	BPL21	Did not compete in 2020-2021
Melbourne eXtreme		Melbourne	Victoria	Club Sunbury	BPL14			
Melbourne Pulse		Melbourne	Victoria	Dandenong Club	BPL10	3	BPL19	
Moama Steamers		Moama	New South Wales	Moama Bowling Club	APL02	4	BPL22	Formerly Murray Steamers
Moreton Bay Pirates		Brisbane	Queensland	Club Pine Rivers	APL01	2	BPL08	Formerly Brisbane Gold / Pirates
Perth Suns		Perth	Western Australia	Bowls Western Australia	APL01			
Sydney Lions		Sydney	New South Wales	Club Mount Lewis	APL01	4	BPL14	
Sydney Saints		Sydney	New South Wales	St Johns Park Bowling Club	BPL20			New BPL franchise
Tasmania Tridents		Hobart	Tasmania	Bowls Tasmania	BPL14			
Tweed Heads Ospreys		Tweed Heads	New South Wales	Club Tweed	BPL10	5	BPL20	

=== Former franchises ===
Team name	Colours	Location	Region/State/Territory	Franchise owner	First season	Last season	Titles	Last title
Adelaide Endurance		Adelaide	South Australia	Bowls South Australia	APL01	BPL05	-	-
Illawarra Gorillas		Illawarra	New South Wales	Warilla Bowls & Recreation Club	BPL06	BPL09	1	BPL09
Melbourne Roys		Melbourne	Victoria	Fitzroy Victoria Bowling & Sports Club	APL01	BPL13	-	-
New Zealand Blackjacks		Various Cities	Various Regions	Bowls New Zealand	APL01	BPL09	1	APL03

== Champions ==
Year	Edition	Location	Winner	Score	Runner-up	MVP
2013	APL01	Brisbane	Brisbane Gold	7–4, 8-2	Adelaide Endurance	Scott Thulborn (Adelaide Endurance)
2014	APL02	Brisbane	Murray Steamers	6–2, 5-3	Adelaide Endurance	Alex Marshall (Murray Steamers)
2015	APL03	Brisbane	New Zealand Blackjacks	6–3, 0–8, 1-0	Adelaide Endurance	Mark Casey (Gold Coast Hawks)
2016	BPL04	Brisbane	Sydney Lions	6–4, 10-6	Murray Steamers	Ryan Bester (Murray Steamers)
2017	BPL05	Auckland (NZ)	Sydney Lions	3–2, 6-3	New Zealand Blackjacks	Shannon McIlroy (New Zealand Blackjacks)
2017	BPL06	Brisbane	Sydney Lions	10-0, 8-1	Illawarra Gorillas	Aron Sherriff (Sydney Lions)
2018	BPL07	Wellington (NZ)	Gold Coast Hawks	5-3, 7-7	Brisbane Pirates	Aron Sherriff (Gold Coast Hawks)
2018	BPL08	Brisbane	Brisbane Pirates	9-2, 6-2	Murray Steamers	Ryan Bester (Murray Steamers)
2019	BPL09	Lower Hutt (NZ)	Illawarra Gorillas	6-9, 7–1, 1-0	Brisbane Pirates	Alex Marshall (Brisbane Pirates)
2019	BPL10	Brisbane	Tweed Heads Ospreys	9-0, 8-1	Sydney Lions	Aaron Teys (Tweed Heads Ospreys)
2020	BPL11	Moama	Murray Steamers	6-1, 3–11, 1-0	Melbourne Roys	Aron Sherriff (Sydney Lions) and Aaron Wilson (Melbourne Roys)
2021	BPL12	Moama	Tweed Heads Ospreys	6-0, 4-1	Adelaide Pioneers	Scott Thulborn (Adelaide Pioneers)
2021	BPL13	Brisbane	Tweed Heads Ospreys	12-2, 7-1	Murray Steamers	Aaron Teys (Tweed Heads Ospreys)
2022	BPL14	Moama	Sydney Lions	5-11, 7–4, 1-0	Moama Steamers	Aron Sherriff (Gold Coast Hawks)
2022	BPL15	Brisbane	Melbourne Pulse	5-3, 3-8, 1-0	Melbourne Extreme	Aron Sherriff (Moama Steamers)
2022	BPL16	Brisbane	Melbourne Pulse	6-3, 10-1	Adelaide Pioneers	Corey Wedlock (Tweed Heads Ospreys)
2023	BPL17	Moama	Moama Steamers	5-2, 6-2	Sydney Lions	Aron Sherriff (Moama Steamers)
2023	BPL18	Brisbane	Tweed Heads Ospreys	4-6, 6-5, 1-0	Melbourne eXtreme	Aaron Teys (Tweed Heads Ospreys)
2024	BPL19	Moama	Melbourne Pulse	1-10, 7-4, 1-0	Moreton Bay Pirates	Gary Kelly (Melbourne Pulse)
2024	BPL20	Brisbane	Tweed Ospreys	8-8, 5-4	Sydney Lions	Nathan Black (Sydney Lions)
2025	BPL21	Moama	Gold Coast Hawks	6-5, 6-2	Geelong Jets	Paul Foster (Geelong Jets)
2025	BPL22	Brisbane	Moama Steamers	6-9, 5-1, 1-0	Sydney Lions	Nathan Black (Sydney Lions)

=== BPL All Star Team ===
Year	Edition	Location	Bowlers	Coach
2022	BPL14	Moama	Aron Sherriff (Gold Coast Hawks), Ben Twist (Sydney Lions), Kelsey Cottrell (Gold Coast Hawks).	Steve Glasson (Sydney Lions)
2022	BPL15	Brisbane	Aron Sherriff (Moama Steamers), Matt Flapper (Melbourne Extreme), Rebecca Van Asch (Tasmania Tridents)	Jeremy Henry & Scott De Jongh (Melbourne Pulse)
2022	BPL16	Brisbane	Corey Wedlock (Tweed Heads Ospreys), Gary Kelly (Melbourne Pulse), Rebecca Van Asch (Tasmania Tridents)	Jeremy Henry (Melbourne Pulse)
2023	BPL17	Moama	Aron Sherriff (Moama Steamers), Aaron Wilson (Sydney Lions), Jo Edwards (Moreton Bay Pirates)	Kevin Anderson (Moama Steamers)
2023	BPL18	Brisbane	Aaron Teys (Tweed Heads Ospreys), Aron Sherriff (Moama Steamers), Kylie Whitehead (Melbourne eXtreme)	Wayne Turley (Tweed Heads Ospreys)
2024	BPL19	Moama	Gary Kelly (Melbourne Pulse), Aaron Wilson (Sydney Lions), Dawn Hayman (Moreton Bay Pirates)	Jeremy Henry & Andrew Breeden-Walton (Melbourne Pulse)
2024	BPL20	Brisbane	Nathan Black (Sydney Lions), Aaron Wilson (Geelong Jets), Dawn Hayman (Sydney Saints)	Wayne Turley (Tweed Ospreys)
2025	BPL21	Moama	Paul Foster (Geelong Jets), Aaron Wilson (Geelong Jets), Kelsey Cottrell (Gold Coast Hawks)	Mark Thatcher (Gold Coast Hawks)
2025	BPL22	Brisbane	Nathan Black (Sydney Lions), Aron Sherriff (Moama Steamers), Kristina Van Nierop (Perth Suns)	Kevin Anderson (Moama Steamers)

=== Championships by club ===
Team	Champions	Runners-up	Competition won
Tweed Heads Ospreys	5	0	BPL10, BPL12, BPL13, BPL18, BPL20
Sydney Lions	4	4	BPL04, BPL05, BPL06, BPL14
Moama/Murray Steamers	4	4	APL02, BPL11, BPL17, BPL22
Melbourne Pulse	3	0	BPL15, BPL16, BPL19
Brisbane Pirates/Gold	2	3	APL01, BPL08
Gold Coast Hawks	2	0	BPL07, BPL21
New Zealand Blackjacks	1	1	APL03
Illawarra Gorillas	1	1	BPL09
Adelaide Endurance	0	3	-
Adelaide Pioneers	0	2	-
Melbourne eXtreme	0	2	-
Melbourne Roys	0	1	-
Geelong Jets	0	1	-

== BPL Cup ==
In 2017, Bowls Australia announced the introduction of the BPL Cup, a nationwide tournament for all clubs in the same mould as football cup competitions, such as the FA Cup.

Each of the eight Australian states and territories hold statewide competitions for all bowls clubs where an eventual state winner will progress to the national BPL Cup finals at Club Pine Rivers.

=== BPL Cup Champions ===
Year	Club	State	Players
2017	Club Merrylands	NSW	Michael Clarke, Neil Burkett, Shawn Thompson
2018	Narrabri	NSW	Graham Spence, Cameron Yates and Peter Hobday
2019	South Perth	WA	Glenn Pauling, Scott Walker, Ashley Sharp
2020	West Lakes	SA	Craig Mills, Nathan Black, TJ Saunders
2021	City Memorial Bowls Club (Warrnambool)	VIC	N. Billington, W. Hall, V. Moloney, C Davey
2022	Highton	VIC	Craig Polwarth, Rob Chambers, Jeremy Fitzgerald, Dan Priddle
2023	Ettalong	NSW	Nathan Malloy, Lee Trethowan, Darren Morrison
2024	Ettalong	NSW	Nathan Malloy, Lee Trethowan, Darren Morrison
2025	Paradise Point	QLD	Jo Watts, Paul Cruise, Darren Christie

== See also ==
- Bowls Australia
