= 2012 World Outdoor Bowls Championship – Men's singles =

Lawn bowls event

World Outdoor Championships 2012 men's singles
- 12th World Outdoor Bowls Championships
- Location: Adelaide, Australia
- Date: 24 November – 9 December 2012.
- Category: 2012 World Outdoor Bowls Championship

The 2012 World Outdoor Bowls Championship men's singles was held at the Lockleys Bowling Club in Adelaide, Australia. Some of the qualifying rounds were held at the nearby Holdfast Bowling Club in Glenelg North.

Leif Selby won the men's singles Gold.

== Section tables ==
=== Pool 1 ===
Pos	Player	P	W	L	F	A	Pts	Shots
1	(Canada) Ryan Bester	11	11	0	231	125	22	+106
2	(Jersey) Malcolm De Sousa	11	9	2	208	151	18	+57
3	(South Africa) Gerry Baker	11	8	3	206	173	16	+33
4	(Malaysia) Muhammad Hizlee Abdul Rais	11	8	3	205	179	16	+26
5	(Wales) Robert Weale	11	7	4	223	153	14	+70
6	(Fiji) Arun Kumar	11	6	5	191	180	12	+11
7	(Republic of Ireland) Martin McHugh	11	5	6	186	173	10	+13
8	(Philippines) Hommer N Mercado	11	4	7	168	205	8	-37
9	(China) Terence Lee	11	3	8	157	205	6	-48
10	(Namibia) Graham Snyman	11	3	8	152	211	6	-59
11	(Brunei) Mohd Salleh Mohd Huzaimi	11	2	9	159	209	4	-50
12	(Brazil) Patrick Moraes Knight	11	0	11	109	231	0	-122

=== Pool 2 ===
Pos	Player	P	W	L	F	A	Pts	Shots
1	(Australia) Leif Selby	11	11	0	231	125	22	+106
2	(Scotland) Paul Foster	11	9	2	227	142	18	+85
3	(New Zealand) Shannon McIlroy	11	9	2	216	166	18	+50
4	(Japan) Kenta Hasebe	11	8	3	215	152	16	+63
5	(England) Jamie Chestney	11	7	4	205	148	14	+63
6	(Hong Kong) Robin Chok	11	5	6	187	190	10	-3
7	(Israel) Tzvika Hadar	11	5	6	165	179	10	-14
8	(Spain) Nick Cole	11	3	8	186	188	6	-2
9	(United States) Steve Nelson	11	3	8	157	211	6	-54
10	(Thailand) Anuruk Rodmanee	11	3	8	150	215	6	-65
11	(Zimbabwe) Ritchie Hayden	10	3	8	135	220	6	-85
12	(Botswana) Oabona Motladiile	11	0	11	93	231	0	-138

== Finals ==
Play Offs
(Australia) Leif Selby
bye
(New Zealand) Shannon McIlroy	21
(Jersey) Malcolm De Sousa	3
(Canada) Ryan Bester
bye
(South Africa) Gerry Baker	21
(Scotland) Paul Foster	9

Semifinals
(Australia) Selby	21
(New Zealand) McIlroy	19
(Canada) Bester	21
(South Africa) Baker	10

Gold medal
(Australia) Selby	21
(Canada) Bester	19

== Results ==
Men's singles section 1
Round 1 – Nov 24		
Canada	Malaysia	21–16
Brunei	Philippines	21–7
Fiji	Namibia	21–10
Wales	Brazil	21–12
Jersey	China	21–13
Ireland	South Africa	21–11
Round 2 – Nov 24		
Fiji	Wales	21–12
Canada	Ireland	21–12
Philippines	China	21–20
South Africa	Malaysia	21–7
Jersey	Brunei	21–15
Namibia	Brazil	21–12
Round 3 – Nov 25		
Ireland	Brunei	21–8
Philippines	Brazil	21–11
Malaysia	Fiji	21–18
Canada	Namibia	21–13
South Africa	China	21–3
Wales	Jersey	21–14
Round 4 – Nov 25		
Fiji	Brunei	21–8
Philippines	Namibia	21–3
China	Ireland	21–18
Jersey	South Africa	21–14
Malaysia	Wales	21–20
Canada	Brazil	21–7
Round 5 – Nov 25		
Jersey	Malaysia	21–14
Wales	Ireland	21–11
Canada	China	21–6
South Africa	Brazil	1-13
Namibia	Brunei	21–15
Fiji	Philippines	21–18
Round 6 – Nov 26		
Canada	Philippines	21–12
Wales	China	21–9
Jersey	Brazil	21–11
South Africa	Fiji	21–10
Ireland	Namibia	21–2
Malaysia	Brunei	21–14
Round 7 – Nov 26		
Malaysia	Philippines	21–9
Canada	Fiji	21–12
China	Brazil	21–2
Wales	Namibia	21–5
Jersey	Ireland	21–11
South Africa	Brunei	21–17
Round 8 – Nov 27		
Fiji	China	21–17
Canada	South Africa	21–13
Wales	Brunei	21–12
Ireland	Brazil	21–7
Jersey	Philippines	21–12
Malaysia	Namibia	21–13
Round 9 – Nov 27		
South Africa	Wales	21–20
Philippines	Ireland	21–14
Malaysia	Brazil	21–17
Jersey	Fiji	21–6
Canada	Brunei	21–11
Namibia	China	21–16
Round 10 – Nov 28		
Malaysia	China	21–10
Wales	Philippines	21–6
Brunei	Brazil	21–13
South Africa	Namibia	21–20
Canada	Jersey	21–5
Ireland	Fiji	21–19
Round 11 – Nov 28		
Fiji	Brazil	21–4
Canada	Wales	21–18
China	Brunei	21–17
South Africa	Philippines	21–20
Malaysia	Ireland	21–15
Jersey	Namibia	21–13

Men's singles section 2
Round 1 – Nov 24		
Spain	Israel	21–4
Japan	United States	21–8
Thailand	Botswana	21–16
Australia	New Zealand	21–11
Scotland	England	21–14
Hong Kong	Zimbabwe	21–7
Round 2 – Nov 24		
Israel	Zimbabwe	21–9
Australia	Scotland	21–19
United States	Thailand	21–11
Japan	Botswana	21–8
Hong Kong	Spain	21–12
New Zealand	England	21–15
Round 3 – Nov 25		
England	Thailand	21–14
Spain	Botswana	21–4
Australia	Zimbabwe	21–11
New Zealand	Hong Kong	21–4
Scotland	Japan	21–20
Israel	United States	21–6
Round 4 – Nov 25		
Hong Kong	Botswana	21–7
Thailand	Zimbabwe	21–16
Japan	England	21–17
Scotland	United States	21–11
Australia	Israel	21–10
New Zealand	Spain	21–18
Round 5 – Nov 25		
Australia	United States	21–10
England	Israel	21–10
Scotland	Spain	21–12
Zimbabwe	Botswana	21–13
Hong Kong	Thailand	21–19
New Zealand	Japan	21–15
Round 6 – Nov 26		
New Zealand	Botswana	21–13
England	Hong Kong	21–9
Australia	Thailand	21–4
Scotland	Zimbabwe	21–8
Japan	Israel	21–9
Spain	United States	21–12
Round 7 – Nov 26		
Israel	Hong Kong	21–18
England	United States	21–11
Scotland	Thailand	21–7
Australia	Botswana	21–4
New Zealand	Zimbabwe	21–14
Japan	Spain	21–19
Round 8 – Nov 27		
Japan	Zimbabwe	21–0
Australia	Hong Kong	21–16
Scotland	New Zealand	21–16
Israel	Thailand	21–11
England	Spain	21–11
United States	Botswana	21–16
Round 9 – Nov 27		
Scotland	Israel	21–11
England	Botswana	21–2
Australia	Spain	21–16
Zimbabwe	United States	21–19
New Zealand	Thailand	21–12
Japan	Hong Kong	21–19
Round 10 – Nov 28		
Hong Kong	Scotland	21–19
New Zealand	United States	21–17
Australia	Japan	21–12
England	Zimbabwe	21–7
Israel	Botswana	21–9
Thailand	Spain	21–15
Round 11 – Nov 28		
United States	Hong Kong	21–16
Scotland	Botswana	21–1
Australia	England	21–12
Zimbabwe	Spain	21–20
Japan	Thailand	21–9
New Zealand	Israel	21–16
