= 2016 World Outdoor Bowls Championship – Men's singles =

Bowls event

World Outdoor Championships 2016 men's singles
- 13th World Outdoor Bowls Championships
- Location: Christchurch, New Zealand
- Date(s): 29 November – 11 December 2016
- Category: 2016 World Outdoor Bowls Championship

The 2016 World Outdoor Bowls Championship men's singles will be held at the Burnside Bowling Club in Avonhead, Christchurch, New Zealand from 6–11 December 2016.

Shannon McIlroy from New Zealand won the men's singles gold medal.

== Section tables ==
=== Section 1 ===
Team	Player	P	W	D	L	Pts	Shots
1	(Canada) Ryan Bester	9	7	0	2	14	+58
2	(Scotland) Darren Burnett	9	7	0	2	14	+52
3	(Australia) Aron Sherriff	9	7	0	2	14	+39
4	(Japan) Kenta Hasebe	9	6	0	3	12	+22
5	(India) Sunil Bahadur	9	5	0	4	10	−5
6	(Jersey) Malcolm De Sousa	9	4	0	5	8	−5
7	(Spain) Peter Bonsor	9	3	0	6	6	−8
8	(Namibia) Willem Esterhuizen	9	3	0	6	6	−30
9	(Guernsey) Todd Priaulx	9	2	0	7	4	−54
10	(Macau) Johnny Ng	9	1	0	8	2	−69

=== Section 2 ===
Team	Player	P	W	D	L	Pts	Shots
1	(New Zealand) Shannon McIlroy	9	8	0	1	16	+64
2	(Wales) Jonathan Tomlinson	9	8	0	1	16	+42
3	(Malaysia) Fairus Jabal	9	6	0	3	12	+24
4	(England) Jamie Walker	9	4	0	5	8	+22
4	Gary Kelly	9	4	0	5	8	+22
6	(Hong Kong) Tony Cheung	9	4	0	5	8	−12
7	(Brunei) Abdul Rahman bin Haji Omar	9	3	0	6	6	−28
8	(South Africa) Gerry Baker	9	3	0	6	6	−32
9	(Norfolk Island) Ryan Dixon	9	3	0	6	6	−33
10	(Cyprus) Loukas Paraskeva	9	2	0	8	4	−69

== Finals ==
Play Offs
(Canada) Bester	bye
(Scotland) Burnett	21
(Malaysia) Jabal	13
(Wales) Tomlinson	8
(Australia) Sherriff	21
(New Zealand) McIlroy	bye

Semifinals
(Canada) Bester	21
(Scotland) Burnett	20
(Australia) Sherriff	17
(New Zealand) McIlroy	21

Gold medal
(Canada) Bester	17
(New Zealand) McIlroy	21

== Results ==
Men's singles section 1
Round 1 – 6 Dec		
Canada	Scotland	21–8
Australia	Spain	21–14
Namibia	Japan	21–20
Jersey	India	21–17
Guernsey	Macau	21–19
Round 2 – 6 Dec		
Canada	Japan	21–19
Australia	Jersey	21–19
Scotland	Macau	21–5
Namibia	Guernsey	21–14
Spain	India	21–17
Round 3 – 6 Dec		
Canada	Jersey	21–12
Australia	Macau	21–15
Scotland	Spain	21–17
Japan	Guernsey	21–13
India	Namibia	21–17
Round 4 – 7 Dec		
Canada	Macau	21–7
Scotland	Australia	21–15
Japan	India	21–13
Spain	Namibia	21–18
Jersey	Guernsey	21–10
Round 5 – 7 Dec		
Australia	Namibia	21–12
Japan	Scotland	21–18
India	Canada	21–20
Guernsey	Spain	21–12
Macau	Jersey	21–16
Round 6 – 7 Dec		
Canada	Namibia	21–8
Australia	Japan	21–13
Scotland	Jersey	21–8
Spain	Macau	21–10
India	Guernsey	21–13
Round 7 – 8 Dec		
Canada	Guernsey	21–11
Scotland	Namibia	21–11
India	Australia	21–18
Japan	Macau	21–9
Jersey	Spain	21–18
Round 8 – 8 Dec		
Canada	Spain	21–18
Scotland	India	21–12
Australia	Guernsey	21–10
Japan	Jersey	21–20
Namibia	Macau	21–12
Round 9 – 8 Dec		
Scotland	Guernsey	21–11
Australia	Canada	21–16
Japan	Spain	21–20
India	Macau	21–17
Jersey	Namibia	21–13

Men's singles section 2
Round 1 – 6 Dec		
Malaysia	Ireland	21–14
Wales	Brunei	21–7
New Zealand	Hong Kong	21–17
England	Norfolk Island	21–5
Cyprus	South Africa	21–20
Round 2 – 6 Dec		
Malaysia	Cyprus	21–9
Wales	Hong Kong	21–17
New Zealand	Brunei	21–10
South Africa	Norfolk Island	21–17
Ireland	England	21–10
Round 3 – 6 Dec		
Malaysia	England	21–17
Wales	South Africa	21–17
New Zealand	Cyprus	21–19
Hong Kong	Ireland	21–15
Norfolk Island	Brunei	21–19
Round 4 – 7 Dec		
Wales	Ireland	21–19
New Zealand	England	21–12
Malaysia	Hong Kong	21–15
South Africa	Brunei	21–13
Cyprus	Norfolk Island	21–18
Round 5 – 7 Dec		
Wales	England	21–20
South Africa	Malaysia	21–13
Hong Kong	Cyprus	21–15
Norfolk Island	New Zealand	21–14
Brunei	Ireland	21–17
Round 6 – 7 Dec		
Wales	Norfolk Island	21–9
New Zealand	South Africa	21–1
Malaysia	Brunei	21–13
Ireland	Cyprus	21–3
England	Hong Kong	21–11
Round 7 – 8 Dec		
New Zealand	Wales	21–17
Malaysia	Norfolk Island	21–10
Ireland	South Africa	21–10
England	Cyprus	21–5
Hong Kong	Brunei	21–17
Round 8 – 8 Dec		
New Zealand	Malaysia	21–7
Wales	Cyprus	21–14
Ireland	Norfolk Island	21–13
Hong Kong	South Africa	21–13
Brunei	England	21–8
Round 9 – 8 Dec		
New Zealand	Ireland	21–14
Wales	Malaysia	21–19
England	South Africa	21–13
Brunei	Cyprus	21–9
Norfolk Island	Hong Kong	21–9
