= Lawn bowls at the 2010 Commonwealth Games – Men's singles =

The men's singles competition began on 9 October 2010. and finished on 13 October 2010. Robert Weale of Wales won the gold medal, defeating Australia's Leif Selby in the final. Gary Kelly from Northern Ireland won the bronze medal.

== Results ==
=== Qualifying – round robin ===
==== Section A ====
Pos	Player	P	W	L	F	A	Pts	Sets
1	(Northern Ireland) Gary Kelly	9	7	2	154	108	14	+10
2	(Australia) Leif Selby	9	6	3	161	116	12	+7
3	(Scotland) Paul Foster	9	6	3	155	107	12	+4
4	(South Africa) Bobby Donnelly	9	6	3	147	137	12	+1
5	(Canada) Ryan Bester	9	4	5	146	120	8	+2
6	(Papua New Guinea) Peter Juni	9	4	5	146	127	8	+2
7	(Malaysia) Safuan Said	9	4	5	142	138	8	-1
8	(Guernsey) Matt Le Ber	9	3	6	94	154	6	-8
9	(India) Mohammad Raja	9	3	6	101	178	6	-8
10	(Samoa) Valovale Pritchard	9	2	7	99	160	4	-11

==== Section B ====
Pos	Player	P	W	L	F	A	Pts	Sets
1	(England) Sam Tolchard	8	7	1	157	86	14	+11
2	(New Zealand) Ali Forsyth	8	7	1	150	92	14	+8
3	(Wales) Robert Weale	8	5	3	164	98	10	+6
4	(Cook Islands) Munokokura Pita	8	4	4	114	129	8	0
5	(Jersey) Michael Rive	8	4	4	109	125	8	-2
6	(Botswana) Raymond Mascarenhas	8	3	5	133	110	6	1
7	(Malta) Shaun Parnis	8	3	5	112	134	6	-3
8	(Niue) Leslie Lagatule	8	2	6	80	169	4	-8
9	(Brunei) Kassim Ampuan	8	1	7	81	157	2	-13

=== Finals ===
Quarterfinals
Gary Kelly (NIR)
Bye
Ali Forsyth (NZL)	11	1	3
Leif Selby (AUS)	2	13	4
Sam Tolchard (ENG)
Bye
Robert Weale (WAL)	8	8
Paul Foster (SCO)	8	5

Semifinals
Gary Kelly (NIR)	9	7
Leif Selby (AUS)	9	9
Sam Tolchard (ENG)	9	3	0
Robert Weale (WAL)	5	8	4

Gold Medal Match
Leif Selby (AUS)	3	10	1
Robert Weale (WAL)	8	6	4
Bronze Medal Match
Gary Kelly (NIR)	6	8	3
Sam Tolchard (ENG)	11	7	2

== See also ==
- Lawn bowls at the 2010 Commonwealth Games
