= Laura Butler =

Swiss lawn bowler

Laura Butler (née Laura Merz)
Personal information
- Nationality: Australian / Swiss
- Born: Laura Merz c.1992

Sport
- Sport: Lawn bowls
- Club: Gstaad BC / Manning Eagles BC

Achievements and titles
- Highest world ranking: 8 (September 2024)
Medal record
Australian nationals
Gold medal – first place	2018	fours

Laura Butler née Merz (born 1992) is a Swiss international lawn bowler. She reached a career high ranking of world number 8 in September 2024.

== Career ==
As Laura Merz she became an Australian national champion after winning the 2018 fours title, at the Australian National Bowls Championships. Two years later, she won the singles title at the 2020 Australian State Championship, bowling for Manning Eagles BC. By February 2022, she was the second ranked women's player in Australia.

In 2023, she married Blake Butler to become Laura Butler but chose to represent Switzerland, the nation of her father. She won the Australian Open fours in 2023 and was then selected as part of the team to represent Switzerland at the 2023 World Outdoor Bowls Championship. She participated in the women's singles and the women's pairs events. In the singles Butler qualified in second place in her group becoming the first Swiss bowler to reach the last eight of the World Championships. She was eliminated in the quarter final after losing to Ellen Ryan.

In 2024, Butler won the Australian Open singles title after defeating Kelsey Cottrell in the final, it was Butler's second Australian Open title.

== Family ==
Her father Markus Merz also represented Switzerland at the 2023 World Championships.
