= John Noonan =

John Noonan may refer to:

- John T. Noonan Jr., American judge
- John Noonan (analyst)
- John Gerard Noonan, American bishop
- John Ford Noonan, American actor, playwright, and screenwriter
- John Noonan (bowls)
