= Melanie Thomas =

Melanie Thomas may refer to:

- Melanie Thomas (bowls), Welsh international lawn bowler
- Mel Thomas (born 1985), American basketball player
- Melanie Valerio Thomas (born 1969), American former Olympic swimmer

== Fictional characters ==
- Melanie Thomas (EastEnders), in the UK TV soap opera EastEnders, played by Ava Healy
