= Bowls at the 2023 Island Games =

Indoor Bowls at the 2023 Island Games
- Venue: Indoor Bowls Stadium, Guernsey
- Dates: 8–14 July
- Competitors: 27 from 8 nations

Indoor Bowls, for the 2023 Island Games, held at Indoor Bowls Stadium, Guernsey in July 2023.

== Medal table ==
* Host nation (Guernsey)

Rank	Nation	Gold	Silver	Bronze	Total
1	Guernsey*	3	2	1	6
2	Falkland Islands	0	1	0	1
3	Jersey	0	0	4	4
4	Bermuda	0	0	1	1
Totals (4 entries)		3	3	6	12

== Participating islands ==
- Alderney
- Bermuda
- Falkland Islands
- Guernsey (Host)
- Jersey
- Orkney
- Western Isles
- Ynys Môn

== Results ==
Event	Gold	Silver	Bronze
Singles	Alison Merrien; Guernsey	Ian Merrien; Guernsey	David Leach; Bermuda
Singles	Alison Merrien; Guernsey	Ian Merrien; Guernsey	Michael Rive; Jersey
Pairs	Guernsey; Joshua Bonsall; Bradley Le Noury	Guernsey; Rose Ogier; Shirley Petit	Jersey; Sally Black; Jean Holmes
Pairs	Guernsey; Joshua Bonsall; Bradley Le Noury	Guernsey; Rose Ogier; Shirley Petit	Jersey; Luke Le Sueur; Cyril Renouf
Triples	Guernsey; Catherine Bonsall; Alison Merrien; Shirley Petit	Falkland Islands; Cecil Alexander; Christopher Locke; Oliver Thompson	Jersey; Luke Le Sueur; Cyril Renouf; Michael Rive
Triples	Guernsey; Catherine Bonsall; Alison Merrien; Shirley Petit	Falkland Islands; Cecil Alexander; Christopher Locke; Oliver Thompson	Guernsey; David King; Michael Le Noury; Stephen Le Noury
