= Bosisto =

Bosisto is a surname. Notable people with the surname include:

- Glyn Bosisto (1899–1990), Australian lawn bowler
- Joseph Bosisto (1827–1898), Australian chemist and politician
- Will Bosisto (born 1993), Australian cricketer
