= Australian Premier League (disambiguation) =

Australian Premier League may refer to:

- The former name of the Australian and New Zealand lawn bowls competition now known as Bowls Premier League
- A provisional name for the A-League, the Australian national soccer league
- A provisional name for the National Premier Leagues, a league system involving Australian state league soccer teams
