= Barrie Lester =

Australian lawn bowler

Personal information
- Full name: Barrie Norman Lester
- Nationality: Australian
- Born: 24 January 1982 (age 44) Bendigo, Australia

Sport
- Sport: Bowls
- Club: Club Kawana, Queensland

Achievements and titles
- Highest world ranking: 26 (June 2024)
Medal record
Men's bowls
Representing Australia
World Outdoor Championships
| Silver medal – second place | 2016 Christchurch | triples |
| Silver medal – second place | 2016 Christchurch | fours |
| Silver medal – second place | 2016 Christchurch | team |
Commonwealth Games
| Bronze medal – third place | 2006 Melbourne | pairs |
| Silver medal – second place | 2018 Gold Coast | triples |
| Silver medal – second place | 2018 Gold Coast | fours |
| Silver medal – second place | 2022 Birmingham | triples |
Asia Pacific Bowls Championships
| Gold medal – first place | 2019 Gold Coast | triples |
| Gold medal – first place | 2019 Gold Coast | fours |

Barrie Norman Lester (born 24 January 1982) is an Australian international lawn and indoor bowler.

== Bowls career ==
=== World Championship ===
In 2016 he was part of the triples team with Aron Sherriff and Mark Casey who won the silver medal at the 2016 World Outdoor Bowls Championship in Christchurch and won another silver medal in the fours.

In 2020 he was selected for the 2020 World Outdoor Bowls Championship in Australia.

=== Commonwealth Games ===
Lester won a bronze medal in the pairs with Nathan Rice at the 2006 Commonwealth Games in Melbourne.

Further success came as part of the Australian team for the 2018 Commonwealth Games on the Gold Coast in Queensland where he won two silver medals in the Triples and the Fours.

In 2022, he competed in the men's triples and the men's fours at the 2022 Commonwealth Games. Lester, along with Carl Healey and Ben Twist won the silver medal.

=== Asia Pacific ===
Lester won double gold at the 2019 Asia Pacific Bowls Championships in the Gold Coast, Queensland.

=== Other ===
In 2012, he won the Hong Kong International Bowls Classic singles title. At national level he has won one Australian National Bowls Championships title and two Australian Opens.
