= Aaron Wilson (bowls) =

Australian lawn bowler (born 1991)

Personal information
- Nickname: Disco Tech
- Nationality: Australian
- Born: 24 November 1991 (age 34) St Arnaud, Victoria

Sport
- Sport: Lawn bowls
- Club: Cabramatta Bowls Club

Achievements and titles
- Highest world ranking: 6 (June 2024)
Medal record
Men's lawn bowls
Representing Australia
World Outdoor Championships
Gold medal – first place	2016 Christchurch	Pairs
Silver medal – second place	2016 Christchurch	Fours
Silver medal – second place	2016 Christchurch	Team
Silver medal – second place	2023 Gold Coast	pairs
Bronze medal – third place	2023 Gold Coast	singles
Gold medal – first place	2023 Gold Coast	team
Commonwealth Games
Gold medal – first place	2018 Gold Coast	Singles
Gold medal – first place	2022 Birmingham	Singles

Aaron Wilson (born 24 November 1991) is an Australian international lawn bowler. He reached a career high ranking of world number 6 in June 2024.

== Bowls career ==
Wilson won the 2016 World Junior Championships and won the gold medal with bowls partner Brett Wilkie in the pairs at the 2016 World Outdoor Bowls Championship and won a silver medal in the fours. He won the Australian Open singles title in 2013.

Wilson was selected as part of the Australian team for the 2018 Commonwealth Games on the Gold Coast in Queensland, where he won a gold medal in the singles. He is currently high performance coach of the Cabramatta Bowling Club in Sydney.

In 2020, he was selected for the 2020 World Outdoor Bowls Championship in Australia but the event was cancelled due to the COVID-19 pandemic. The following year in 2021, he won his second Australian Open singles crown.

In 2022, he competed in the men's singles and the men's pairs at the 2022 Commonwealth Games and won the gold medal in the men's singles. In 2022, he also won his third Australian Open.

In 2023, he won his fourth Australian Open, after a second successive pairs win with Ben Twist and then he was selected as part of the team to represent Australia at the 2023 World Outdoor Bowls Championship. He participated in the men's singles and the men's pairs events. In the pairs with Aaron Teys, they won the silver medal after losing to Ireland in the final and one week later, in the singles he won a bronze medal after reaching the semi final stage, where he lost to Gary Kelly.
