= Kylie Whitehead =

Australian lawn bowler

Personal information
- Nationality: Australia
- Born: 1994 (age 31–32)

Sport
- Sport: Bowls
- Club: Wodonga BC
Medal record
Bowls
Representing Australia
World Singles Champion of Champions
| Gold medal – first place | 2019 Adelaide | women's title |

Kylie Whitehead (born 1994) is a female international Australian lawn bowler.

Whitehead is of English and Walpiri background. She was raised in Chiltern in north-east Victoria by her father's parents.

Whitehead is a physiotherapist and studied physiotherapy at Charles Sturt University.

== Bowls career ==
Whitehead began playing bowls in 2010 at Wodonga Bowls Club alongside her grandfather.

Whitehead won the 2019 World Singles Champion of Champions beating Debbie White in the final. She was the 2017 Australian National Bowls Championships singles winner and has played over 100 state matches for Victoria.
