= Ben Twist =

Australian lawn bowler

Personal information
- Nationality: Australian
- Born: 1 June 1990 (age 36)

Sport
- Club: St Johns Park BC

Achievements and titles
- Highest world ranking: 14 (September 2024)
Medal record
Representing Australia
Commonwealth Games
| Silver medal – second place | 2022 Birmingham | triples |

Ben Twist (born 1 June 1990) is an Australian international lawn bowler. He reached a career high ranking of world number 14 in September 2024.

== Bowls career ==
He started bowling in 2003 and his first success was the Queensland state triples in 2007. He won the Australian Open triples in 2010 and made his international debut in 2018.

Twist became the Australian national champion after winning the 2019 Australian National Bowls Championships triples title.

In 2018, he won the Hong Kong International Bowls Classic singles title, having previously won the pairs with Jesse Noronha in 2017. In 2021, he won his second Australian Open crown, this time in the fours.

In 2022, he competed in the men's triples and the men's fours at the 2022 Commonwealth Games. Twist, along with Carl Healey and Barrie Lester won the silver medal. Later in 2022, he won a third Australian Open.

In 2023, he won his fourth Australian Open, after a second successive pairs win with Aaron Wilson. Later in October, Twist won the Australian Nationals fours title with Craig Donaldson, Mathew Pietersen and David Ferguson.
