= World Singles Champion of Champions =

World bowls event

The World Singles Champion of Champions is an event inaugurated in 2003 that is contested annually between bowlers who have won their respective national singles title.

The event was first held in 2003 at the Moama Bowling Club in Moama, Australia. Traditionally the competition favours the Southern Hemisphere players because the Northern Hemisphere players have to travel to the event and compete on faster greens. Lee Schraner of Australia and Jo Edwards of New Zealand are the most successful bowlers having won two gold medals.

== Past winners ==
=== Men's singles ===
Year	Venue	Winner	Runner-up	Ref
2003	Moama, Australia	(Namibia) Douw Calitz	(Scotland) Darren Burnett	
2004	Warilla, Australia	(New Zealand) Ali Forsyth	(Scotland) David Anderson	
2005	Christchurch, New Zealand	(England) Mark Walton	(New Zealand) Dwayne Cameron	
2006	Christchurch, New Zealand	(Scotland) Darren Burnett	(Israel) Jeff Rabkin	
2007	Warilla, Australia	(New Zealand) Tony Grantham	(Eswatini) Willie James	
2008	Aberdeen, Scotland	(Australia) Leif Selby	(Wales) Mark Weaver	
2009	Ayr, Scotland	(Australia) Brett Wilkie	(Scotland) Wayne Hogg	
2010	Norfolk Island	(Australia) Aron Sherriff	(New Zealand) Andrew Todd	
2011	Hong Kong, China	(Jersey) Thomas Greechan	(Scotland) Jonathan Ross	
2012	Paphos, Cyprus	(Malaysia) Muhammad Hizlee Abdul Rais	(Hong Kong) Stanley Lai	
2013	Christchurch, New Zealand	(England) Tom Bishop	(Scotland) Alistair White	
2014	Christchurch, New Zealand	(Scotland) Iain McLean	(Malaysia) Fairus Jabal	
2015	Brisbane, Australia	Neil Mulholland+	(Malaysia) Fairul Izwan Abd Muin	
2016	Brisbane, Australia	(Australia) Scott Thulborn	(Wales) Jonathan Tomlinson	
2017	Sydney, Australia	(Australia) Aaron Teys	(New Zealand) Dean Elgar	
2018	Sydney, Australia	(New Zealand) Shannon McIlroy	(Hong Kong) Tony Cheung	
2019	Adelaide, Australia	(Australia) Lee Schraner	(Hong Kong) Tony Cheung	
2020	Adelaide, Australia	cancelled due to COVID-19 pandemic		
2021	Naenae B.C., Wellington, New Zealand	cancelled due to COVID-19 pandemic		
2022	Naenae B.C., Wellington, New Zealand	(England) Sam Tolchard	(Malaysia) Izzat Dzulkeple	
2023	Club Robina, Gold Coast, Australia	(Wales) Daniel Salmon	(Scotland) Darren Gualtieri	
2024	Browns Bay BC, Auckland, New Zealand	(Australia) Lee Schraner	(New Zealand) Aiden Takarua	
2025	Club Barham, Barham, Australia	David Copeland	(Fiji) Rajnesh Prasad	

=== Women's singles ===
Year	Venue	Winner	Runner-up	Ref
2003	Moama, Australia	(Eswatini) Liz James	(Guernsey) Alison Merrien	
2004	Warilla, Australia	Margaret Johnston+	(Scotland) Karen Dawson	
2005	Christchurch, New Zealand	(Malaysia) Nor Iryani Azmi	(New Zealand) Sharon Sims	
2006	Christchurch, New Zealand	(England) Julie Saunders	(Australia) Julie Keegan	
2007	Warilla, Australia	(Guernsey) Alison Merrien	(Malaysia) Siti Zalina Ahmad	
2008	Aberdeen, Scotland	(Wales) Kathy Pearce	(Scotland) Lorraine Malloy	
2009	Ayr, Scotland	(Australia) Kelsey Cottrell	(Guernsey) Lucy Beere	
2010	Norfolk Island	(New Zealand) Jan Khan	(Scotland) Joyce Lindores	
2011	Hong Kong, China	(New Zealand) Jo Edwards	(Scotland) Caroline Brown	
2012	Paphos, Cyprus	(New Zealand) Sandra Keith	(Zimbabwe) Jane Rigby	
2013	Christchurch, New Zealand	(Australia) Karen Murphy	(Scotland) Lorna Smith	
2014	Christchurch, New Zealand	(Scotland) Lorna Smith	(Netherlands) Saskia Schaft	
2015	Brisbane, Australia	(Malaysia) Emma Firyana Saroji	(South Africa) Nicolene Neal	
2016	Brisbane, Australia	(Australia) Natasha Scott	(Brunei) Amalia Matali	
2017	Sydney, Australia	(Wales) Laura Daniels	(Malaysia) Emma Firyana Saroji	
2018	Sydney, Australia	(New Zealand) Jo Edwards	(Malaysia) Alyani Jamil	
2019	Adelaide, Australia	(Australia) Kylie Whitehead	(New Zealand) Debbie White	
2020	Adelaide, Australia	cancelled due to COVID-19 pandemic		
2021	Naenae B.C., Wellington, New Zealand	cancelled due to COVID-19 pandemic		
2022	Naenae B.C., Wellington, New Zealand	(New Zealand) Tayla Bruce	(Australia) Carla Krizanic	
2023	Club Robina, Gold Coast, Australia	(United States) Anne Nunes	(Guernsey) Lucy Beere	
2024	Browns Bay BC, Auckland, New Zealand	(Tonga) Milika Nathan	(United States) Anne Nunes	
2025	Club Barham, Barham, Australia	(Norfolk Island) Shae Wilson	(New Zealand) Debbie White	

+Ireland competes as one nation

== See also ==
World Bowls Events
