= Brendan Aquilina =

Maltese bowls player (born 1987)

Personal information
- Nationality: Maltese
- Born: 23 September 1987 (age 38) Wollongong, Australia

Sport
- Sport: Lawn and indoor bowls
Medal record
Representing Malta
World Cup Singles
Silver medal – second place	2019 Warilla	singles
Atlantic Bowls Championships
Bronze medal – third place	2019 Cardiff	pairs

Brendan Aquilina (born 23 September 1987) is a Maltese international lawn and indoor bowler.

== Bowls career ==
=== Outdoors ===
He was born in Wollongong, Australia and started bowling at the Jamberoo Bowling Club in New South Wales. He represented Malta in the 2010 Commonwealth Games.

He was selected as part of the Maltese team for the 2018 Commonwealth Games on the Gold Coast in Queensland where he reached the semi-finals of the Pairs with Shaun Parnis. In 2019 he won the pairs bronze medal with Mark Malogorski at the Atlantic Bowls Championships and in 2020 he was selected for the 2020 World Outdoor Bowls Championship in Australia.

In 2021, Aquilina won the 2020 triples title with Gary Kelly and Corey Wedlock at the delayed Australian National Bowls Championships. The following day he also won the fours title with Wedlock, Jamie Turner and Aaron Teys.

=== Indoors ===
In 2019 he finished runner-up to Gary Kelly in the final of the World Cup Singles.
