= Lisa Phillips (bowls) =

Personal information
- Full name: Lisa Renee Phillips
- Born: 29 May 1993 (age 33) Moe, Victoria, Australia
- Spouse: Annika Parsons Married January 8th 2022

Sport
- Country: Australia
- Sport: Lawn bowls

Lisa Phillips (born 29 May 1993) is an Australian lawn bowler from Victoria, Australia. Growing up watching both her parents and grandparents play lawn bowls at the age of 10 years she decided she wanted to participate. Phillips was only playing socially with family up until the age of 13 when she then decided she would attend the Victoria State Junior Squad. At age 15 years, Phillips was first chosen to represent Victoria at junior level which then led to many years competing in the junior ranks. In 2008 Phillips had represented Victoria in the Australian Junior Championships and received a silver medal in the fours discipline.

== Career ==
Lisa Phillips had a successful career in her junior years, landing herself representing Australia in the Junior Trans Tasman Series against New Zealand. In 2010, Phillips at age 17 years, had her first open age win when she successfully took out the title of the Queensland Open which secured her a spot to participate in the Australian Open of bowls. Phillips then went on to win the Australian Open in 2011 against good friend Samantha Shannahan. Shortly after Phillips had taken out the title of the 2011 Australian Open Championship, she had then been picked to be a member of the Australian Squad. Spending two years as a member, Phillips was never picked to represent Australia.

Following her success in 2011, Phillips competed in the 2012 Australian Open and made it to the finals to then come runner up to Lynsey Clarke. In 2013, Phillips made another attempt at the Australian Open silverware, which was successful and scored Phillips her third year in the finals and the only female bowler to win two Australian Open titles, making her the number one female bowler in Australia.

== Personal life ==
Lisa Phillips is a member of the LGBT community and is openly acknowledged as being a lesbian. Phillips has stated that she wants to bring a new age twist to Lawn Bowls rather than the tradition and is most commonly recognized as having both tattoos and piercings.

== Achievements ==
2009-2010 Winner QLD Open Singles, Winner Junior Golden Nugget, Winner NSW under 25 Singles,

2010-2011 Australian Open Women's Singles Champion, Australian Open Under 18 runner up, Semi-Finalist Australian Indoor Singles, Semi-Finalist Golden Nugget

2011-2012 Runner Up Australian Open Women's Singles, Australian Super Six Singles Champion, Victorian State Singles Champion, Victorian Under 25 Singles Champion

2012-2013 Australian Open Women's Singles Champion, Australian Open Women's Triples Champion

2013-2014 Semi-Finalist Australian Open Women's Singles
