= Dwayne Cameron (bowls) =

New Zealand bowler (born 1976)

Personal information
- Nationality: New Zealander
- Born: 1976 (age 49–50)

Sport
- Club: Manurewa Cosmopolitan BC; Homai BC
Medal record
Representing New Zealand
Asia Pacific Bowls Championships
Silver medal – second place	2007 Christchurch	fours

Dwayne Cameron (born 1976) is an international lawn bowler from New Zealand.

== Bowls career ==
Cameron came to prominence when becoming the champion of New Zealand winning the singles title at the 2005 New Zealand National Bowls Championships. He had previously been part of the fours that won the 2006 title. The single success qualified him for the 2005 World Singles Champion of Champions, where he secured a silver medal losing in the final to Mark Walton of England.

In 2007, he won a silver medal at the Asia Pacific Bowls Championships (with Richard Girvan, Doug Wilson and Shannon McIlroy.
