= Sophie McIntyre =

Irish lawn bowler

Personal information
- Nationality: British (Northern Irish)

Sport
- Sport: Lawn & indoor bowls
- Club: Ballymoney BC (outdoor); Ballybrakes Community BC (indoor)
Medal record
Representing Combined Ireland
World Outdoor Championships
Bronze medal – third place	2023 Gold Coast	triples

Sophie McIntyre is a combined Ireland international lawn and indoor bowler.

== Bowls career ==
McIntyre, who bowls for Limavady BC and Ballybrakes Community BC, came to prominence after winning the women's 2022 Irish under 25 singles and u25 pairs outdoor titles and going on to win the gold in the u25 singles and silver medal in the U25 pairs at the British Isles Bowls Championships.

Later in 2022, she was part of the rinks (fours) team, that won the Northern Ireland national indoor title.

In 2023, she made her international debut for the combined Ireland team in test matches against Jersey and Scotland. Her performances led to her being selected by the national team, to represent them at the sport's blue riband event, the 2023 World Bowls Championship. She participated in the women's singles and the women's triples events. In the triples partnering Shauna O'Neill and Chloe Wilson, the team won a bronze medal after losing to Australia in the semi finals.
