= Aiden Takarua =

New Zealand lawn bowler

Personal information
- Nationality: New Zealander
- Born: c.1999

Sport
- Club: Pt Chevalier BC

Achievements and titles
- Highest world ranking: 6 (August 2026)
Medal record
Representing (New Zealand)
World Singles Champion of Champions
Silver medal – second place	2024 Auckland	singles
Hong Kong International Classic
Gold medal – first place	2025	singles

Aiden Takarua (born c.1999) is a New Zealand lawn bowler. He reached a career high ranking of world number 6 in August 2026.

== Bowls career ==
In 2024, Takarua won the silver medal at the World Singles Champion of Champions, which was held in Auckland, New Zealand. The New Zealander who had qualified for the event by virtue of winning his national title claimed the silver medal after winning eight of his nine pool matches. He then defeated Lewis King of England in the quarter-final, Pat Bird of Canada in the semi-final before losing the final to Australia's Lee Schraner.

Previously in 2024, Takarua had won the singles at the New Zealand National Bowls Championships, defeating the defending champion Sheldon Bagrie-Howley in the final.

Takarua qualified for the 2025 World Indoor Bowls Championship and in November, won the 2025 singles title at the Hong Kong International Classic.
