= Page playoff system =

Playoff format

The Page playoff system is a playoff format. It is used in top level competitions in softball, curling, Australian rules football and the Indian Premier League, Pakistan Super League, and Bangladesh Premier League cricket tournaments, and is used widely in lower level competitions around Australia. Teams are seeded using a round-robin or league tournament, and the top four play a mix of a single-elimination and double-elimination tournament to determine the winner.

== History ==
The Page playoff system first gained prominence in Australia, where it was adopted by all of the top level state football leagues (the Victorian Football League, West Australian Football League and South Australian National Football League) in 1931. It came to be named after Percy "Pip" Page, the Richmond Football Club delegate who moved the motion to adopt it in the Victorian league; and it was first proposed by lawyer Kenneth McIntyre. The system came to used widely throughout Australia in many sports for most four-team finals competitions.

The Page playoff system was used at the Australian Rugby League Championship 1954–1972. In Australia, its most notable use today is in netball, having been adopted by Super Netball when it began play in 2017.

The system has been used since 1990 by the International Softball Federation and its successor, the World Baseball Softball Confederation, for the Women's Softball World Championship and from 1996 to 2008 at the Olympic Games.

Its first use in curling was by the Canadian Curling Association in the 1995 Labatt Brier, the men's championship, and was adopted the next year at the 1996 Scott Tournament of Hearts, the women's championship. It gained acceptance and in 2005 the World Curling Championships started using it until 2018 when the playoff format was switched to re-seeding 6 team single-elimination. It has not yet been adopted in curling at the Olympic Games.

The format is used in the Indian Premier League cricket tournament since 2011.

The format has also been used in some much lower-key, internet gaming events, such as chess and backgammon.

Beginning with the 2020 season, the League of Legends Championship Series uses a double-elimination format with a Page playoff system being employed for the final rounds of the playoff tournament. A similar format would also be adopted for the League of Legends European Championship that same year.

The 2021 playoffs saw the National Basketball Association use the system for its Play-In Tournament. It featured teams ranked 7th–10th in their respective conferences during the regular season. The winner of the 7–8 game advanced to the playoffs as the seventh seed, while the loser played in the preliminary final game against the winner of the 9–10 game for the eighth seed. This meant the 7th and 8th place teams have two chances to win once, while the 9th and 10th place teams needed to win back-to-back games. This play-in format remains in use as of the 2025 NBA playoffs.

The Page playoff is used by the Bowls Premier League in Australia, in a slightly modified format. Before the four teams play in a Page bracket, the fourth and fifth place teams from the round robin play each other in an elimination game, with the loser being eliminated and the winner moving on to play the third place team in the main Page bracket.

The League of Legends Pro League also uses the same system to determine its final two World Championship berths since 2020, followed by League of Legends Champions Korea since 2022.

== Format ==
The system requires teams to be ranked in some way, as the top two teams have an advantage over the bottom two. This is usually accomplished through a round-robin tournament, which eliminates all but the top four teams.

The Page playoff system was invented in Australia in the early 1930s and adopted soon after by the Victorian Football League (now known as the Australian Football League). The top four teams advance to the playoffs, which are played over three rounds with one team being eliminated in each round.

The format progresses as follows:

- In Game 1, the third- and fourth-placed teams play against each other. The loser is eliminated.
- In Game 2, the first- and second-placed teams play against each other. The winner qualifies directly for the final.
- In Game 3, the winner of Game 1 plays against the loser of Game 2. The loser is eliminated.
- Game 4 (the final) is then played between the winners of Games 2 and 3.

This system gives the top two teams a double chance, in that they can lose their first game and still go on to win the title, producing a similar though not identical effect to a double-elimination tournament. This gives the top two teams a significant advantage over the next two, since winning the title from third or fourth place requires winning one more game than winning from first or second, and also requires defeating every other team in the playoffs. Additionally, the higher-ranked team in any pairing (which, in the final, is automatically the team that won Game 2) will play as the home team to provide an additional advantage; in the case of curling teams, where teams rarely play national or international tournaments at their home rink, the advantage is that the first-placed team is given the hammer (last rock) in the first end, which is a reasonable advantage between comparably skilled teams.

In the 2008 World Women's Curling Championship, a fifth match was added to the format: a bronze medal playoff match, which was played between the two teams which did not qualify for the final (the losers of Games 1 and 3). This game is normally scheduled between Games 3 and 4. Previously, the bronze would have automatically been awarded to the team which lost Game 3, so this game provides a chance for the loser of Game 1 to still receive a medal. This was also introduced at the national level at the 2011 Scotties Tournament of Hearts and the 2011 Tim Hortons Brier. The bronze medal game was heavily criticized for being "meaningless" in part because simply winning a "medal" does not carry the same sort of prestige it does in the Olympic Games. The bronze medal game was eliminated prior to the 2018 Canadian championship curling season.

=== Names of matches ===
In Australia, Games 1 and 2 are known as Semi-Finals; Game 3 is called the Preliminary Final, and the final is known as the Grand Final. To distinguish between the two Semi-Finals, which are different in nature, the match between 3rd and 4th is known either as the First semi-final or the Minor Semi-Final; and the match between 1st and 2nd is known either as the Second semi-final or the Major Semi-Final.

In Curling, Games 1 and 2 are usually known as the 3–4 game and 1–2 game, respectively (and Game 2 is usually played first, to give the higher-ranked team more rest before Game 3); Game 3 is called the Semi-Final, and the final is known by that name. In China's LPL, Game 2 is known as the Winner's Bracket, while Game 1 and Game 3 are respectively called Loser's Bracket first round and Loser's Bracket final. There is no real final, the winner of Game 2 would be the 3rd seed of LPL in the Worlds, while the winner of Game 3 is seeded as 4th and have to enter the play-in round.

In the Indian Premier League, the 1–2 match is referred to as Qualifier 1, the 3–4 match is referred to as the Eliminator, and the third game is referred to as Qualifier 2 respectively.

=== Examples ===
1931 Victorian Football League playoffs

The first-ever use of the system was in Australia in 1931 after the Victorian Football League adopted it. The regular season ended with Geelong winning the minor premiership, followed by Richmond, Carlton and Collingwood. The finals proceeded as follows:

Semifinals
1	Geelong	10.6 (66)
2	Richmond	15.9 (99)
3	Carlton	20.10 (130)
4	Collingwood	5.12 (42)

Preliminary Final
1	Geelong	11.17 (83)
3	Carlton	11.11 (77)

Grand Final
2	Richmond	7.6 (48)
1	Geelong	9.14 (68)

Page playoff, including a bronze medal match, from the 2011 Scotties Tournament of Hearts.

Page Playoffs
1	Saskatchewan	9
2	Canada	10
3	Ontario	13
4	Nova Scotia	5

Semifinal
1	Saskatchewan	7
3	Ontario	5

Final
2	Canada	7
1	Saskatchewan	8
Third place
4	Nova Scotia	9
3	Ontario	7

== See also ==
- AFL finals series
- NBA play-in tournament
- McIntyre system
