= Cassandra Millerick =

Australian lawn bowler

Personal information
- Nationality: Australian
- Born: 28 May 1994 (age 32) Australia

Sport
- Sport: Bowls
- Club: Moama BC; Moama Steamers

Achievements and titles
- Highest world ranking: 5 (June 2024)

Cassandra Millerick (born 28 May 1994) is an Australian international lawn bowler. She reached a career high ranking of world number 5 in June 2024.

== Bowls career ==
Millerick came to prominence in 2021, after winning the pairs title with Kelsey Cottrell at the Australian National Bowls Championships.

Two years later in 2023, she became the champion of Australia when winning the singles title at the nationals. By winning the 2023 national title, she propelled herself into a world ranking high of 5.
