= 2023 World Outdoor Bowls Championship – Women's singles =

Bowls competition

2023 World Outdoor Bowls Championships – Women's singles
- 14th World Outdoor Bowls Championships
- Location: Gold Coast, Australia
- Date: 29 August to 10 September
- Category: World Bowls Championship

The 2023 World Outdoor Bowls Championship – Women's singles will be the 14th edition of the World Championships to be held on the Gold Coast in Queensland, Australia from 29 August to 10 September. There will be five venues; the Broadbeach Bowls Club, Musgrave Hill Bowls Club, Club Helensvale, Paradise Point Club and Mudgeraba Club.

The women's singles is one of eight events that will determine the 2023 world champions.

== Section tables ==
=== Section 1 ===
Team	Player	P	W	L	Pts	Shots
1	(Australia) Ellen Ryan	10	10	0	30	139
2	(Sri Lanka) Kumari Mangos	10	8	2	24	58
3	(Zimbabwe) Jane Rigby	10	7	3	21	33
4	(Philippines) Marisa Baronda	10	6	4	15	16
5	(Thailand) Orawan Sodok	10	5	5	15	14
6	(Cyprus) Sara Trotter	10	5	5	15	4
7	(Netherlands) Ineke Spangenberg	10	4	6	12	-8
8	(Spain) Debbie Colquhoun	10	3	7	9	-49
9	(Botswana) Lephai Marea Modutlwa	10	3	7	9	-53
10	(Falkland Islands) Daphine Almond	10	3	7	9	-62
11	(Argentina) Lucila Bausili	10	1	9	3	-92

=== Section 2 ===
Team	Player	P	W	L	Pts	Shots
1	(England) Katherine Rednall	9	8	1	24	95
2	(Hong Kong) Gloria Ha	9	8	1	24	52
3	(Scotland) Emma McIntyre	9	7	2	21	49
4	(Cook Islands) Teokotai Jim	9	5	4	15	9
5	(Wales) Melanie Thomas	9	5	4	15	-15
6	(France) Cindy Royet	9	4	5	12	-22
7	(Papua New Guinea) Piwen Karkar	9	3	6	9	-19
8	(Israel) Ruth Gilor	9	2	7	6	-25
9	Sophie McIntyre	9	2	7	6	-34
10	(Brazil) Maria Evangelisti	9	1	8	3	-90

=== Section 3 ===
Team	Player	P	W	L	Pts	Shots
1	(Canada) Kelly McKerihen	9	9	0	27	112
2	(South Africa) Colleen Piketh	9	7	2	21	63
3	(Fiji) Losalini Diqoya	9	6	3	18	19
4	(Guernsey) Lucy Beere	9	6	3	18	10
5	(Jersey) Megan Kivlin	9	5	4	15	-6
6	(Norfolk Island) Shae Wilson	9	4	5	12	16
7	(Turkey) Bahar Cil	9	3	6	9	-74
8	(India) Tania Choudhary	9	2	7	6	-13
9	(Malta) Irene Attard	9	2	7	6	-41
10	(Namibia) Bianca Lewis	9	1	8	3	-86

=== Section 4 ===
Team	Player	P	W	L	Pts	Shots
1	(New Zealand) Tayla Bruce	8	8	0	24	74
2	(Switzerland) Laura Butler	8	7	1	21	60
3	(United States) Anne Nunes	8	6	2	18	51
4	(Malaysia) Alyani Jamil	8	4	4	12	15
5	(Japan) Keiko Kurohara	8	4	4	12	11
6	(Singapore) Philomena Goh Quee Kee	8	3	5	9	-20
7	(Niue) Joy Peroux	8	3	5	9	-29
8	(Macau) Tam Sim Fong	8	1	7	3	-39
9	(Samoa) Lei Kaleopa	8	0	8	0	-123
10	(Kenya) Eunice Wambui Mbugua	withdrew				

== Finals ==
Play Offs
(Australia) Ryan	21
(Switzerland) Butler	11
(Australia) Bruce	21
(Sri Lanka) Mangos	11
(England) Rednall	21
(South Africa) Piketh	11
(Canada) McKerihen	21
(Hong Kong) Ha	12

Semifinals
(Australia) Ryan	12
(New Zealand) Bruce	21
(England) Rednall	20
(Canada) McKerihen	21

Gold medal
(New Zealand) Bruce	21
(Canada) McKerihen	18

== Results ==
Women's singles section 1
Round 1 (28 Aug)		
Australia	Falkland Islands	21–4
Philippines	Thailand	21–11
Spain	Netherlands	6–21
Cyprus	Botswana	21–7
Argentina	Zimbabwe	6–21
Round 2 (29 Aug)		
Cyprus	Argentina	21–6
Botswana	Netherlands	21–16
Philippines	Spain	21–5
Australia	Thailand	21–14
Falkland Islands	Sri Lanka	2–21
Round 3 (29 Aug)		
Sri Lanka	Philippines	21–7
Netherlands	Falkland Islands	21–10
Thailand	Cyprus	17-21
Zimbabwe	Spain	21–4
Botswana	Argentina	18–21
Round 4 (29 Aug)		
Botswana	Zimbabwe	10–21
Spain	Cyprus	12–21
Netherlands	Thailand	10–21
Falkland Islands	Philippines	21–10
Australia	Sri Lanka	21–8
Round 5 (30 Aug)		
Australia	Netherlands	21–7
Cyprus	Sri Lanka	15–19
Falkland Islands	Zimbabwe	4–21
Thailand	Argentina	21–10
Spain	Botswana	21–5
Round 6 (30 Aug)		
Argentina	Spain	9–21
Thailand	Zimbabwe	15–21
Cyprus	Falkland Islands	19–17
Sri Lanka	Netherlands	20–16
Philippines	Australia	3–21
Round 7 (30 Aug)		
Philippines	Cyprus	21–7
Zimbabwe	Australia	1–21
Argentina	Sri Lanka	6–21
Botswana	Falkland Islands	21–10
Thailand	Spain	21–12
Round 8 (31 Aug)		
Botswana	Thailand	8–21
Argentina	Falkland Islands	0–9
Sri Lanka	Zimbabwe	18–16
Cyprus	Australia	6–21
Philippines	Netherlands	21–13
Round 9 (31 Aug)		
Zimbabwe	Netherlands	20–19
Argentina	Philippines	19–21
Australia	Botswana	21–6
Sri Lanka	Spain	21–8
Falkland Islands	Thailand	21–16
Round 10 (1 Sep)		
Spain	Falkland Islands	21–11
Botswana	Sri Lanka	18–19
Australia	Argentina	21–9
Zimbabwe	Philippines	8–21
Cyprus	Netherlands	16–21
Round 11 (1 Sep)		
Sri Lanka	Thailand	20–21
Australia	Spain	21–13
Philippines	Botswana	17–21
Argentina	Netherlands	17–21
Zimbabwe	Cyprus	21–20

Women's singles section 2
Round 1 (28 Aug)		
Scotland	Papua New Guinea	21–6
Wales	France	21–20
Hong Kong	Ireland	21–14
England	Cook Islands	21–9
Israel	Brazil	21–12
Round 2 (29 Aug)		
Cook Islands	Ireland	21–10
Wales	Hong Kong	16–21
France	Scotland	12–21
Papua New Guinea	Brazil	21–1
England	Israel	21–15
Round 3 (29 Aug)		
Brazil	Wales	21–11
Ireland	Papua New Guinea	21–16
France	England	4–21
Cook Islands	Hong Kong	4–21
Scotland	Israel	21–19
Round 4 (29 Aug)		
Hong Kong	England	21–18
Ireland	France	20–21
Papua New Guinea	Wales	14–21
Scotland	Brazil	21–8
Israel	Cook Islands	18–21
Round 5 (30 Aug)		
Scotland	Ireland	21–13
England	Brazil	21–1
Papua New Guinea	Cook Islands	8–21
Hong Kong	France	21–13
Israel	Wales	14–21
Round 6 (30 Aug)		
Cook Islands	France	21–14
England	Papua New Guinea	21–16
Brazil	Ireland	9–21
Wales	Scotland	21–14
Israel	Hong Kong	9–21
Round 7 (30 Aug)		
Wales	England	6–21
Cook Islands	Scotland	19–21
Hong Kong	Brazil	21–12
France	Papua New Guinea	21–10
Ireland	Israel	14–21
Round 8 (31 Aug)		
Hong Kong	Papua New Guinea	21–17
Brazil	Cook Islands	12–21
England	Scotland	21–15
Ireland	Wales	21–11
France	Israel	21–11
Round 9 (31 Aug)		
Brazil	France	13–21
Scotland	Hong Kong	21–8
Cook Islands	Wales	18–21
England	Ireland	21–4
Israel	Papua New Guinea	20–21

Women's singles section 3
Round 1 (28 Aug)		
Canada	Malta	21–5
Norfolk Island	India	13–21
Turkey	South Africa	3–21
Fiji	Guernsey	21–11
Jersey	Namibia	21–5
Round 2 (29 Aug)		
Guernsey	South Africa	21–17
Norfolk Island	Turkey	21–14
India	Canada	13–21
Malta	Namibia	21–15
Fiji	Jersey	21–17
Round 3 (29 Aug)		
Namibia	Norfolk Island	2–21
South Africa	Malta	21–8
India	Fiji	16–21
Guernsey	Turkey	11–21
Canada	Jersey	21–5
Round 4 (29 Aug)		
Turkey	Fiji	4–21
South Africa	India	21–16
Malta	Norfolk Island	16–21
Canada	Namibia	21–2
Jersey	Guernsey	14–21
Round 5 (30 Aug)		
Canada	South Africa	21–13
Fiji	Namibia	21–17
Malta	Guernsey	15–21
Turkey	India	3–21
Jersey	Norfolk Island	21–20
Round 6 (30 Aug)		
Guernsey	India	21–12
Fiji	Malta	21–10
Namibia	South Africa	11–21
Norfolk Island	Canada	7–21
Jersey	Turkey	21–8
Round 7 (30 Aug)		
Norfolk Island	Fiji	21–7
Guernsey	Canada	17–21
Turkey	Namibia	21–15
India	Malta	13–21
South Africa	Jersey	21–8
Round 8 (31 Aug)		
Turkey	Malta	21–18
Namibia	Guernsey	14–21
Fiji	Canada	14–21
South Africa	Norfolk Island	21–16
India	Jersey	18–21
Round 9 (31 Aug)		
Namibia	India	21–20
Canada	Turkey	21–1
Guernsey	Norfolk Island	21–20
Fiji	South Africa	10–21
Jersey	Malta	21–20

Women's singles section 4
Round 1 (28 Aug)		
New Zealand	Macau	19–17
Malaysia	Niue	21–13
Samoa	United States	3–21
Kenya	Singapore	+
Japan	Switzerland	10–21
Round 2 (29 Aug)		
Singapore	United States	13–21
Malaysia	Samoa	21–1
Niue	New Zealand	7–21
Macau	Switzerland	11–21
Kenya	Japan	+
Round 3 (29 Aug)		
Switzerland	Malaysia	21–15
United States	Macau	21–8
Niue	Kenya	+
Singapore	Samoa	21–5
New Zealand	Japan	21–11
Round 4 (29 Aug)		
Samoa	Kenya	+
United States	Niue	21–13
Macau	Malaysia	8–21
New Zealand	Switzerland	21–18
Japan	Singapore	21–17
Round 5 (30 Aug)		
New Zealand	United States	21–15
Kenya	Switzerland	+
Macau	Singapore	15–21
Samoa	Niue	7–21
Japan	Malaysia	20–21
Round 6 (30 Aug)		
Singapore	Niue	12–21
Kenya	Macau	+
Switzerland	United States	21–18
Malaysia	New Zealand	15–21
Japan	Samoa	21–8
Round 7 (30 Aug)		
Malaysia	Kenya	+
Singapore	New Zealand	1–21
Samoa	Switzerland	9–21
Niue	Macau	18–17
United States	Japan	21–17
Round 8 (31 Aug)		
Samoa	Macau	4–21
Switzerland	Singapore	21–14
Kenya	New Zealand	+
United States	Malaysia	21–12
Niue	Japan	12–21
Round 9 (31 Aug)		
Switzerland	Niue	21–7
New Zealand	Samoa	21–8
Singapore	Malaysia	21–15
Kenya	United States	+
Japan	Macau	21–10

+Kenya forfeited
