= Jack Petchell =

Australian rules footballer

Personal information
- Full name: John Harold Petchell
- Born: 14 December 1904; Kaniva, Victoria
- Died: 10 August 1968 (aged 63); South Australia
- Original team: Melbourne University / Scotch College

Playing career^{1}
Years	Club	Games (Goals)
1927–1929	South Melbourne	35 (36)
1929–1930	Preston (VFA)	16 (5)
- ^{1} Playing statistics correct to the end of 1930.

John Harold 'Jack' Petchell (14 December 1904 – 10 August 1968) was an Australian rules footballer and an Australian international lawn bowler.

== Australian rules football ==
Petchell played with South Melbourne in the Victorian Football League (VFL) for three seasons. He subsequently played for Preston in the Victorian Football Association (VFA).

== War service ==
Petchell served in the Australian Army during World War II.

== Lawn bowls ==
Petchell won the 1947 singles title at the Australian National Bowls Championships when bowling for the Sturt Bowls Club.
