= Carl Healey =

Australian lawn bowler

Personal information
- Nationality: Australian
- Born: 29 March 1987 (age 39) Penrith, New South Wales, Australia

Sport
- Club: Cabramatta BC

Achievements and titles
- Highest world ranking: 6 (August 2024)
Medal record
Representing Australia
World Outdoor Championships
Gold medal – first place	2023 Gold Coast	triples
Gold medal – first place	2023 Gold Coast	fours
Gold medal – first place	2023 Gold Coast	team
Commonwealth Games
Silver medal – second place	2022 Birmingham	triples

Carl Healey (born 29 March 1987) is an Australian international lawn bowler. He has represented Australia at the Commonwealth Games and won a silver medal. He reached a career high ranking of world number 6 in August 2024.

== Bowls career ==
He started bowling in 2000 and won the Australian Open fours in 2008 and pairs in 2018.

In 2022, he competed in the men's triples and the men's fours at the 2022 Commonwealth Games. Healey, along with Ben Twist and Barrie Lester won the silver medal in the triples. Later in 2022, he won his third Australian Open.

In 2023, he was selected as part of the team to represent Australia at the 2023 World Outdoor Bowls Championship. He participated in the men's triples and the men's fours events. In the triples with Corey Wedlock and Aron Sherriff, he won the gold medal. One week later in the fours partnering Wedlock, Sherriff and Aaron Teys, the team won their group before reaching the final against Scotland, where he won a second gold medal winning 12–10 to complete a very successful championships.

In 2024, Healey won the Australian Open fours title with Peter Taylor, Gary Kelly and Ray Pearse, it was Healey's fourth Australian Open title.
