= Nathan Pedersen =

Australian lawn bowler

Personal information
- Nationality: Australian
- Born: 1995 (age 29–30)

Sport
- Club: Modbury BC

Nathan Pedersen (born 1995) is an Australian international lawn bowler.

== Bowls career ==
Pedersen has won four Australian Open titles. The 2015 & 2016 fours, the 2016 pairs and the 2017 singles.

He has twice won the Hong Kong International Bowls Classic pairs title, winning in 2015 and 2016 with Corey Wedlock.

In 2022, he won his fifth title at the Australian Open.
