= William James (bowls) =

South African-Eswatini lawn bowler (b. 1969)

Personal information
- Full name: William John James
- Nationality: Swati / South African
- Born: 22 August 1969 (age 56)
Medal record
Representing Eswatini
World Singles Champion of Champions
| Silver medal – second place | 2007 Warilla | singles |

William John James (born 22 August 1969) is a South African born, Eswatini (formerly named Swaziland) international lawn bowler.

== Bowls career ==
James made his international debut in 1998 and has represented Swaziland at two Commonwealth Games; in the singles event at the 2002 Commonwealth Games and in the singles event at the 2006 Commonwealth Games.

He won a silver medal at the 2007 World Singles Champion of Champions in Warilla, Australia.

== Personal life ==
He is a farmer by trade and lives in Malkerns.
