= Melanie Thomas (bowls) =

British lawn bowler

Personal information
- Nationality: British (Welsh)

Sport
- Sport: Lawn bowls
- Club: Lampeter BC (outdoors)
Medal record
Representing Wales
Atlantic Bowls Championships
| Gold medal – first place | 2019 Cardiff | fours |

Melanie Thomas is a Welsh international lawn bowler.

== Bowls career ==
Thomas became a national champion in 2019 after winning the singles at the Welsh National Bowls Championships.

In 2019 she won the fours gold medal at the Atlantic Bowls Championships

In 2023, she was selected as part of the team to represent Wales at the 2023 World Outdoor Bowls Championship. She participated in the women's singles and the women's triples events.
