= Anne Johns =

Scottish-born Australian lawn bowler

Personal information
- Nationality: Australian
- Born: 1980 Scotland

Sport
- Sport: Lawn bowls
- Club: Engadine Cougars
Medal record
Representing Australia
Asia Pacific Bowls Championships
Gold medal – first place	2015 Christchurch	fours
Silver medal – second place	2015 Christchurch	triples

Anne Johns is a Scottish-born Australian international lawn bowler.

== Early life and background ==
Anne Johns was born in 1981 in Scotland. She later moved to Australia, where she became involved in the sport of lawn bowling.

== Career ==
Johns has represented Australia at various international competitions. She has earned recognition for her skills and achievements in lawn bowling, competing at national and international levels. Her career highlights include at the Asia Pacific Championships where Johns won a fours gold medal with Natasha Scott, Kelsey Cottrell and Carla Krizanic and a triples silver medal with Scott and Krizanic at the 2015 Asia Pacific Bowls Championships in New Zealand.

In 2018 she won the pairs title with Kelsey Cottrell, at the Australian National Bowls Championships and won the title again 2022 with Samantha Ferguson. In 2021, she won her 8th Australian Open crown, this time in the fours.

In 2025, she won her ninth Australian Open title (7th in fours).

== Children ==
Anne Johns has 2 children. The eldest, Jack Johns, was born in 2013, followed by Sophie Johns, in 2017.
