= Sharyn Renshaw =

Personal information
- Nationality: Australia
- Born: 22 July 1961 (age 64) St Johns Park, New South Wales
Medal record
Representing Australia
Lawn Bowls
Commonwealth Games
Silver medal – second place	2010 Delhi	Women's triples

Sharyn Renshaw is an Australian international Lawn Bowls player.

In 2010, she won the silver medal in the triples at the 2010 Commonwealth Games in the Women's triples event.
