= Corey Wedlock =

Australian lawn bowler

Personal information
- Nationality: Australian
- Born: 15 June 1996 (age 30)

Sport
- Sport: Bowls
- Club: Warilla BC (outdoors)

Achievements and titles
- Highest world ranking: 1 (August 2026)
Medal record
Representing Australia
World Outdoor Championships
Gold medal – first place	2023 Gold Coast	triples
Gold medal – first place	2023 Gold Coast	fours
Gold medal – first place	2023 Gold Coast	team
Bowls World Cup
Bronze medal – third place	2025 Kuala Lumpur	singles

Corey Wedlock (born 15 June 1996) is an international Australian lawn and indoor bowler. He reached a career high ranking of world number 1 in August 2026.

== Bowls career ==
Corey made his international debut in 2017 and has twice won the pairs with Nathan Pedersen at the Hong Kong International Bowls Classic in 2015 and 2016.

In 2020, he was selected for the 2020 World Outdoor Bowls Championship in Australia but the event was cancelled due to the COVID-19 pandemic.

In 2021, Wedlock won the delayed triples title with Gary Kelly and Brendan Aquilina at the delayed Australian National Bowls Championships. The following day he also won the fours title with Aquilina, Jamie Turner and Aaron Teys.

In 2022, he competed in the men's pairs and the men's fours at the 2022 Commonwealth Games.

In 2023, he won his first Australian Open and then was selected as part of the team to represent Australia at the 2023 World Outdoor Bowls Championship. He participated in the men's triples and the men's fours events. In the triples with Aron Sherriff and Carl Healey, they won the gold medal. In the fours partnering Aaron Teys, Healey and Sherriff the team won their group before reaching the final against Scotland, where he won a second gold medal winning 12–10 to complete a very successful championships.

In October 2023, Wedlock won the National pairs title with Gary Kelly and in 2025, he won the Australian Open pairs title with Kelly.
