= Genevieve Delves =

Australian bowls player (born 1978)

Personal information
- Nationality: Australian
- Born: 21 September 1978 (age 48) Australia

Rugby union career
- Position: Fly-half
Amateur team(s)
| Years | Team | Apps | (Points) |
- Warringah
International career
| Years | Team | Apps | (Points) |
| 1998–2002 | Australia | 3 | (0) |

Sport
- Sport: Bowls
- Club: Maitland City BC

Achievements and titles
- Highest world ranking: 35 (June 2024)

Genevieve Delves (born 21 September 1978) is an Australian international lawn and indoor bowler.

== Rugby union career ==
Delves represented Australia at the 1998 and 2002 Women's Rugby World Cups.

== Bowls career ==
In 2019, she won the Australian National indoor title, which qualified her to represent Australia at the 2022 World Bowls Indoor Championships. The delay in representing Australia at the event was due to cancellations in 2020 and 2021 because of the COVID-19 pandemic

In 2023, Delves won a second pairs title at the Australian Open but missed out on selection for the 2023 World Bowls Championship. Later in October 2023, Delves won the Australian National Bowls Championships triples title with Kate Matthews and Natasha Van Eldik.
