= John Noonan (bowls) =

Australian lawn bowler

Personal information
- Nationality: Australian

Sport
- Club: Marion BC
Medal record
Representing (Australia)
Asia Pacific Bowls Championships
Silver medal – second place	1997 Warilla	fours

John Noonan is an Australian international lawn bowler.

== Bowls career ==
Noonan became the Australian national champion after winning the 1994 Australian National Bowls Championships singles title. Two years later in 1996, he won the Hong Kong International Bowls Classic singles title.

Noonan then won a silver medal at the 1997 Asia Pacific Bowls Championships, held in Warilla, Australia.
