= Scott Thulborn =

Australian lawn bowls player

Personal information
- Nationality: Australian
- Born: 1984 (age 41–42) Australia

Sport
- Sport: Lawn bowls
- Club: Adelaide BC
Medal record
Representing Australia
World Singles Champion of Champions
Gold medal – first place	2016 Brisbane	Men's Singles

Scott Thulborn (born 1984) is a retired Australian lawn bowls player, who won the 2016 World Singles Champion of Champions.

== Bowls career ==
In 2016, Thulborn became the World Singles Champion of Champions defeating Jonathan Tomlinson of Wales in the final. He is twice the winner of the fours event at Australian National Bowls Championships (2015 & 2016).

In 2019, he announced his retirement from the Australian squad after representing Australia on 32 occasions since 2017.
