= Michael Rive =

Jersey bowls player

Personal information
- Nationality: British (Jersey)
- Born: 1986 (age 39–40)

Sport
- Sport: Lawn bowls
- Club: JBC

Achievements and titles
- Highest world ranking: 45 (sept 2024)
Medal record
Representing Jersey
Atlantic Bowls Championships
Bronze medal – third place	2011 Paphos	pairs
European Bowls Championships
Silver medal – second place	2022 Ayr	singles

Michael Rive (born 1986) is an international lawn bowler representing Jersey.

== Bowls career ==
Rive has represented Jersey at the Commonwealth Games in the men's singles.

In 2011, he won the pairs bronze medal at the Atlantic Bowls Championships with Malcolm De Sousa.

In 2022, he won the silver medal in the singles at the 2022 European Championships.

Rive won the gold medal in the singles at the 2025 Island Games in Orkney as well as silver in the triples where he played alongside Josh Band and Kevin Le Long.
