= Dawn Hayman =

Australian lawn bowler

Personal information
- Nationality: Australian
- Born: 25 May 1997 (age 29)

Sport
- Sport: Lawn bowls
- Club: St Johns Park BC

Achievements and titles
- Highest world ranking: 1 (February 2026)
Medal record
Women's bowls
Representing Australia
World Outdoor Championships
Gold medal – first place	2023 Gold Coast	triples
Silver medal – second place	2023 Gold Coast	fours
Bronze medal – third place	2023 Gold Coast	team
Bowls World Cup
Bronze medal – third place	2025 Kuala Lumpur	singles

Dawn Hayman (born 25 May 1997) is an Australian international lawn bowler. She reached a career high ranking of world number 1 in February 2026.

== Career ==
Hayman made her debut for Australia in 2019 after winning the gold medal in the pairs at the 2019 Australian Open. In 2022, she won the silver medal in the 2022 Australian Open singles.

In 2023, she was selected as part of the team to represent Australia at the 2023 World Outdoor Bowls Championship. She participated in the women's triples and the women's fours events. In the fours, her team won the silver medal after losing to England in the final. One week later in the triples (partnering Lynsey Clarke and Kelsey Cottrell), the team won the group undefeated and reached the final against New Zealand, going on to win the gold medal.

In 2024, Hayman won the Australian National Bowls Championships pairs with Natasha Russell. In 2025, Hayman won her second Australian Open but first in the singles event.
