= Lee Schraner =

Australian bowls player

Personal information
- Born: 31 January 1982 (age 44) Prahran, Victoria, Australia
- Years active: 1994–present

Sport
- Sport: Lawn Bowls
- Club: Raymond Terrace Bowling Club

Achievements and titles
- Highest world ranking: 6 (July 2025)
Medal record
Bowls
Representing Australia
World Singles Champion of Champions
Bronze medal – third place	2018 Sydney	Men's
Gold medal – first place	2019 Adelaide	Men's
Bronze medal – third place	2022 Wellington	Men's
Gold medal – first place	2024 Auckland	Men's

Lee James Schraner (born 1982) is a lawn bowls dual World Singles Champion of Champions gold and bronze medalist. He reached a career high ranking of world number 6 in July 2025.

== Bowls career ==
Schraner began bowls in 1994 at Mount Cottrell Bowling Club, located on the outskirts of Melton, Victoria. Schraner has represented Australia at Under 25 level and Open Men's Level on numerous occasions. He became the 132nd male to represent Australia in Lawn Bowls when he led in the pairs for Mark Jacobsen against England, in the "Battle on the Border" at Moama Bowling Club on carpet in February 2010.

Schraner was omitted from the Australian Squad that same year, prior to the Delhi Commonwealth Games. In July 2018 he was named in the Australian Jackaroos Emerging Squad (the tier below the Open squad), but after just one year, he was omitted in June 2019. However, he won the 2019 World Singles Champion of Champions, beating Tony Cheung in the final.

He became the number one ranked bowler in Australia in October 2018 and held the ranking until June 2019.

At age 37, he retired from official National duties stating "It is a great thing to chase your dreams but life is too short to chase them forever", clearly related to his lack of opportunity at the highest level. Schraner made himself available for the Australian team again in 2024 after a string of successful results, and was selected in the Australian Jackaroos Squad of 10 men for the 2024/25 season.

Schraner won the World Singles Champion of Champions for the second time in 2024, defeating New Zealander Aiden Takarua in the final.

=== National Championships ===
Schraner is the only player in history to have won the Australian Champion of Champions singles gold medal four times. These victories came in 2017 in Darwin, 2018 in Hobart, 2022 (for the 2021 event) on the Gold Coast and 2023 in Perth. He won the Australian Open Pairs in 2011, the Australian Fours Gold Medal in 2019 and the Australian Pairs Gold Medal in 2020.

== Published Author ==
Published Stories & Books released by Lee Schraner
Title	Year	Comments
Nothing to Prove	2024	Autobiography
In the Zone - Developing Mental Toughness in Lawn Bowls	2014	Non-fiction and educational
In the Zone II - Secrets of a World Champ	2020	Non-fiction and educational
