= Fairus Jabal =

Malaysian international lawn bowler (born 1989)

Personal information
- Nationality: Malaysian
- Born: 10 December 1989 (age 36) Pahang

Sport
- Sport: Bowls
Medal record
Representing Malaysia
World Champion of Champions
Silver medal – second place	2014 Christchurch	Men's singles
Asia Pacific Bowls Championships
Bronze medal – third place	2011 Adelaide	fours
Southeast Asian Games
Gold medal – first place	2017 Kuala Lumpur	triples
Gold medal – first place	2019 Philippines	triples

Mohamad Fairus Abd Jabal (born 10 December 1989) is a Malaysian international lawn bowler.

== Bowls career ==
=== World Championships ===
He competed for Malaysia at the 2016 World Outdoor Bowls Championship in New Zealand. In 2020 he was selected for the 2020 World Outdoor Bowls Championship in Australia.

=== World Singles Champion of Champions ===
Jabal won a singles silver medal in the 2014 World Singles Champion of Champions in the Christchurch, New Zealand.

=== Commonwealth Games ===
He represented Malaysia during the 2014 Commonwealth Games.

=== Asia Pacific Championships ===
He won a bronze medal at the 2011 Asia Pacific Bowls Championships in Adelaide. He has also won two gold medals in the triples at the Lawn bowls at the 2017 Southeast Asian Games and the Lawn bowls at the 2019 Southeast Asian Games.
