= Glyn Bosisto =

Australian lawn bowler

Personal information
- Nationality: Australian
- Born: 15 February 1899 Gawler, South Australia
- Died: 16 December 1990 (aged 91) Windsor, Victoria

Sport
- Sport: Lawn bowls
- Club: Victoria BC; Auburn BC

Glyn de Villiers Bosisto (15 February 1899 – 16 December 1990) was an Australian international lawn bowler.

== Bowls career ==
After moving to Adelaide he took up bowls under his father's tuition at the Prospect Bowls Club. After being transferred to Melbourne by the bank in 1932, he became the club champion at Glen Iris BC before returning to Sydney in 1935. He was seven times City Club champion and also North Sydney club champion. In 1941 he won the fours at the Metropolitan and State championships before joining the Victoria Bowling Club and later the Auburn club.

He won the Australian National Bowls Championships singles title four consecutive years from 1949 until 1953 in addition to skipping the fours to two titles in 1951 and 1957.

He represented Australia, New South Wales and Victoria 256 times and appeared for Australia in the singles at the Lawn bowls at the 1954 British Empire & Commonwealth Games and again in the singles at the Lawn Bowls at the 1958 British Empire and Commonwealth Games.

== Personal life ==
He was the youngest of eight children and was educated at Gawler District High School before joining the National Bank of Australasia Ltd aged 16. He married Audrey Davies in 1928 and his banking career forced several re-locations throughout his career. He became a bank manager before retiring from the banking industry in 1955.

In 1977 he was appointed MBE and was inducted into the Sport Australia Hall of Fame eight years later in 1985.

Author: Bosisto Glyn in collaboration with John Fitzgerald "Bowling Along" First published 1963 Stanley Paul, London. Bosisto, Glyn: "Bowls by Bosisto - Concise Instructions on the Technique and Art of How to Play Lawn Bowls" ISBN 0 9591319 06 First Published 1983 Quadricolor Mulgrave Victoria

Personal

Wife Audrey
