= 2023 World Outdoor Bowls Championship =

Bowls competition

2023 World Outdoor Bowls Championships
- 14th World Outdoor Bowls Championships
- Location: Gold Coast, Australia
- Date: 29 August to 10 September
- Website official website
- Category: World Bowls Championship

The 2023 World Outdoor Bowls Championship is the 14th edition of the World Bowls Championship, held on the Gold Coast in Queensland, Australia from 29 August to 10 September.

The event was long-awaited by the sport because the 2020 World Outdoor Bowls Championship was cancelled due to the COVID-19 pandemic, resulting in a seven-year wait since the last championships in 2016. Consequently, the Championships will now be held every two years.

There are five venues; the Broadbeach Bowls Club, Musgrave Hill Bowls Club, Club Helensvale, Paradise Point Club and Mudgeraba Club.

There are eight events that determine the 2023 world champions, the men's singles, doubles, triples and fours and the women's singles, doubles, triples and fours and in addition there are two overall team winners, who receive the Leonard and Taylor trophies respectively. The finals were broadcast live on Fox Sports (Australia), Kayo Sports and Sky Sport (New Zealand).

== Participating teams ==
There were 43 nations/associations competing at 2023 Championships, although only eight countries are represented in all of the events and Kenya pulled out before the tournament started.

Member nations
- Australia (hosts)
- Argentina
- Botswana
- Brazil
- Canada
- Cook Islands
- Cyprus
- Czech Republic
- England
- Falkland Islands
- Fiji
- France
- Guernsey
- Hong Kong, China
- India
- Ireland
- Israel
- Japan
- Jersey
- Kenya
- (Macau) Macao, China
- Malaysia
- Malta
- Namibia
- Netherlands
- New Zealand
- Niue
- Norfolk Island
- Papua New Guinea
- Philippines
- Samoa
- Scotland
- Singapore
- South Africa
- Spain
- Sri Lanka
- Sweden
- Switzerland
- Thailand
- Turkey
- United States
- Wales
- Zimbabwe

== Medallists ==
Event	Gold	Silver	Bronze	Bronze
Men's singles	(Canada); Ryan Bester	Gary Kelly	(Scotland); Iain McLean	(Australia); Aaron Wilson
Men's pairs	Gary Kelly; Adam McKeown	(Australia); Aaron Wilson; Aaron Teys	(Canada); John Bezear; Ryan Bester	(Malaysia); Idham Amin Ramlan; Izzat Dzulkeple
Men's triples	(Australia); Corey Wedlock; Aron Sherriff; Carl Healey	(Scotland); Paul Foster; Derek Oliver; Alex Marshall	(England); Louis Ridout; Nick Brett; Jamie Walker	Stuart Bennett; Ian McClure; Martin McHugh
Men's fours	(Australia); Corey Wedlock; Aaron Teys; Carl Healey; Aron Sherriff	(Scotland); Jason Banks; Derek Oliver; Paul Foster; Alex Marshall	Stuart Bennett; Adam McKeown; Ian McClure; Martin McHugh	(New Zealand); Tony Grantham; Chris Le Lievre; Lance Pascoe; Sheldon Bagrie-Howley
Men's team	Australia	Ireland	Scotland	N/A
Women's singles	(New Zealand); Tayla Bruce	(Canada); Kelly McKerihen	(England); Katherine Rednall	(Australia); Ellen Ryan
Women's pairs	(Malaysia); Nur Ain Nabilah Tarmizi; Aleena Nawawi	(Malta); Rebecca Rixon; Connie-Leigh Rixon	(England); Sophie Tolchard; Amy Pharaoh	(Scotland); Emma McIntyre; Claire Anderson
Women's triples	(Australia); Dawn Hayman; Lynsey Clarke; Kelsey Cottrell	(New Zealand); Tayla Bruce; Val Smith; Leeane Poulson	(Canada); Joanna Cooper; Baylee van Steijn; Emma Boyd	Sophie McIntyre; Shauna O'Neill; Chloe Wilson
Women's fours	(England); Sophie Tolchard; Jamie-Lea Marshall; Lorraine Kuhler; Amy Pharaoh	(Australia); Kristina Krstic; Dawn Hayman; Lynsey Clarke; Kelsey Cottrell	(Scotland); Carla Banks; Claire Anderson; Stacey McDougall; Caroline Brown	(New Zealand); Leeane Poulson; Selina Goddard; Val Smith; Katelyn Inch
Women's team	New Zealand	England	Australia	N/A

== Results ==
=== Men's team (W.M.Leonard Trophy) ===
	Team	Singles	Pairs	Triples	Fours	Total
1	Australia	20+2	18+4	18+6	20+6	94
2	Ireland	20+4	20+6	18+2	20+2	92
3	Scotland	18+2	20	20+4	20+4	88
4	Malaysia	20	18+2	20	14	74 (+333)
5	England	20	16	20+2	16	74 (+298)
6	Canada	18+6	20+2	16	12	74 (+228)
7	New Zealand	18	18	14	20+2	72
8	Wales	16	20	16	18	70
9	India	16	18	16	14	64 (+204)
10	Hong Kong China	18	16	12	18	64 (+145)
11	United States	12	12	20	18	62 (+195)
12	Cook Islands	14	16	14	18	62 (+96)
13	South Africa	14	14	16	16	60 (+170)
14	Jersey	16	16	14	14	60 (+13)
15	Thailand	10	14	18	14	56
16	Israel	12	12	12	16	52
17	Fiji	14	8	14	12	48
18	Zimbabwe	10	14	12	8	44
19	Philippines	12	12	10	8	42 (+0)
20	Singapore	12	14	6	10	42 (-40)
21	Japan	16	4	18	4	42 (-59)
22	Norfolk Island	10	10	10	10	40
23	Namibia	8	6	8	16	38
24	Malta	4	8	12	12	36
25	Botswana	8	8	10	8	34 (-139)
26	(Macau) Macao China	4	10	8	12	34 (-150)
27	Papua New Guinea	6	10	8	6	30 (-169)
28	Argentina	8	6	6	10	30 (-276)
29	France	6	6	10	6	28 (-243)
30	Turkey	4	10	4	10	28 (-438)
31	Switzerland	6	8	6	6	26
32	Samoa	4	4	8	8	24
33	Netherlands	10	12	0	0	22
34	Niue	4	4	6	6	20
35	Czech Republic	14	0	0	0	14
36	Sweden	4	6	0	0	10 (-97)
37	Spain	6	4	0	0	10 (-199)
38	Guernsey	8	0	0	0	8 (-1)
39	Falkland Islands	4	4	0	0	8 (-276)
40	Cyprus	4	0	0	0	4 (-65)
41	Sri Lanka	4	0	0	0	4 (-123)
42	Brazil	4	0	0	0	4 (-149)

=== Women's team (Taylor Trophy) ===
	Team	Singles	Pairs	Triples	Fours	Total
1	New Zealand	20+6	20	20+4	20+2	92
2	England	20+2	20+2	20	20+6	90
3	Australia	20+2	16	20+6	20+4	88
4	Canada	20+4	12	18+2	18	74 (+207)
5	Malaysia	14	20+6	18	16	74 (+157)
6	Scotland	16	18+2	16	20+2	74 (+145)
7	South Africa	18	16	18	18	70
8	Hong Kong China	18	12	16	18	64
9	Wales	12	18	14	18	62
10	Philippines	14	16	12	16	58 (+119)
11	India	6	16	20	16	58 (+85)
12	Norfolk Island	10	20	14	12	56 (+89)
13	Ireland	4	18	18+2	14	56 (+52)
14	Malta	4	18+4	14	16	56 (+27)
15	United States	16	14	16	10	56 (+22)
16	Cook Islands	14	14	12	12	52
17	Thailand	12	12	12	14	50 (+28)
18	Jersey	12	8	16	14	50 (+10)
19	Fiji	16	10	12	12	50 (-33)
20	Zimbabwe	16	14	8	6	44
21	Singapore	10	10	10	10	40 (-37)
22	Japan	12	4	10	14	40 (-82)
23	Switzerland	18	6	6	10	40 (-145)
24	Argentina	4	10	8	12	34 (-257)
25	Turkey	8	8	10	8	34 (-416)
26	Botswana	4	10	10	8	32 (-237)
27	Papua New Guinea	8	8	8	8	32 (-248
28	Niue	8	6	6	10	30
29	Guernsey	14	14	0	0	28
30	Israel	6	0	14	0	20
31	Sri Lanka	18	0	0	0	18
32	Netherlands	8	8	0	0	16 (-63)
33	Namibia	4	12	0	0	16 (-84)
34	France	10	6	0	0	16 (-104)
35	(Macau) Macao China	6	6	0	0	12
36	Cyprus	10	0	0	0	10
37	Spain	6	0	0	0	6
38	Falkland Islands	4	0	0	0	4 (-62)
39	Brazil	4	0	0	0	4 (-90)
40	Samoa	4	0	0	0	4 (-123)

=== Para overall team (inaugural title) ===
	Team	Men's Pairs	Women's Pairs	Mixed VI Pairs	Total
1	Australia	20+6	18+2	18+6	70
2	Scotland	16	16+4	16+2	54
3	New Zealand	14	20+6	12	52
4	South Africa	20+4	0	20+4	48
5	England	16	10+2	14+2	44
6	Hong Kong China	18+2	12	10	42
7	Thailand	14	14	0	28
8	Singapore	18+2	0	0	20
9	South Korea	12	0	0	12 (-30)
10	Wales	12	0	0	12 (-45)
11	Japan	10	0	0	10

=== Medal tally (no trophy/medals awarded) (excluding team medals) ===
	Team	Gold	Silver	Bronze	Total
1	Australia	5	2	3	10
2	New Zealand	2	1	2	5
3	Ireland	1	1	3	5
4	Canada	1	1	2	4
5	England	1	0	4	5
6	Malaysia	1	0	1	2
7	Scotland	0	3	4	7
8	South Africa	0	2	0	2
9	Malta	0	1	0	1
10	Hong Kong China	0	0	1	1
	Singapore	0	0	1	1
	Thailand	0	0	1	1
