= Lynsey Clarke =

Australian lawn bowler

Personal information
- Nationality: Australian
- Born: Lynsey Reeve Armitage; 6 December 1983 (age 42) Pontefract, West Yorkshire, England

Sport
- Club: Tweed Heads BC

Achievements and titles
- Highest world ranking: 4 (June 2024)
Medal record
Women's Lawn bowls
Representing Australia
World Outdoor Championships
Gold medal – first place	2008 Christchurch	Women's fours
Bronze medal – third place	2008 Christchurch	Women's pairs
Gold medal – first place	2008 Christchurch	Women's team
Gold medal – first place	2012 Adelaide	Women's triples
Gold medal – first place	2012 Adelaide	Women's team
Gold medal – first place	2023 Gold Coast	triples
Silver medal – second place	2023 Gold Coast	fours
Bronze medal – third place	2023 Gold Coast	team
Commonwealth Games
Gold medal – first place	2006 Victoria	Women's pairs
Silver medal – second place	2014 Glasgow	Women's triples
Asia Pacific Bowls Championships
Bronze medal – third place	2003 Brisbane	fours
Gold medal – first place	2005 Melbourne	pairs
Gold medal – first place	2007 Christchurch	pairs
Bronze medal – third place	2007 Christchurch	fours
Bronze medal – third place	2009 Kuala Lumpur	pairs
Gold medal – first place	2011 Adelaide	triples
Silver medal – second place	2011 Adelaide	fours
Gold medal – first place	2019 Gold Coast	pairs
Bronze medal – third place	2019 Gold Coast	fours

Lynsey Reeve Clarke (née Armitage, born 6 December 1983 in Pontefract, West Yorkshire, England) is an Australian lawn bowler. She reached a career high ranking of world number 4 in June 2024.

== Bowls career ==
=== World Championship ===
In 2008, she won a gold in the fours and team event and a bronze medal in the pairs at the 2008 World Outdoor Bowls Championship. The success continued in the 2012 World Outdoor Bowls Championship winning another gold medal in the triples and team events.

In 2020, she was selected for the 2020 World Outdoor Bowls Championship in Australia but the event was cancelled due to the COVID-19 pandemic. In 2023, she was selected as part of the team to represent Australia at the 2023 World Outdoor Bowls Championship. She participated in the women's triples and the women's fours events. In the fours, her team won the silver medal after losing to England in the final. One week later in the triples (partnering Kelsey Cottrell and Dawn Hayman), the team won the group undefeated and reached the final against New Zealand, going on to win the gold medal.

=== Commonwealth Games ===
She competed in the 2006 Commonwealth Games Pairs competition with Karen Murphy and won the gold medal. In 2014 under her married name of Clarke she competed in the Women's triples at the 2014 Commonwealth Games where she won a silver medal.

In 2022, she competed in the women's triples and the Women's fours at the 2022 Commonwealth Games.

=== Asia Pacific ===
Clarke has won nine medals at the Asia Pacific Bowls Championships (two of which were in her maiden name of Armitage). The medal haul includes four gold medals, the latest at the 2019 Asia Pacific Bowls Championships in the Gold Coast, Queensland.

=== National ===
In 2017 she won the pairs and fours titles at the Australian National Bowls Championships and in 2021, she won her 8th & 9th Australian Open crown, this time in the pairs and fours. In 2022, she won her 10th title at the Australian Open.

In 2023, Clarke won the Australian National Bowls Championships pairs title with Claire Turley and in 2025, she won the Australian Open fours title.
