= Aaron Teys =

Australian bowls player

Personal information
- Nationality: Australian
- Born: 7 December 1993 (age 32)

Sport
- Sport: Bowls
- Club: Warilla BC

Achievements and titles
- Highest world ranking: 3 (June 2024)
Medal record
Bowls
Representing Australia
World Outdoor Championships
Gold medal – first place	2023 Gold Coast	fours
Silver medal – second place	2023 Gold Coast	pairs
Gold medal – first place	2023 Gold Coast	team
World Singles Champion of Champions
Gold medal – first place	2017 Sydney	singles
Asia Pacific Bowls Championships
Gold medal – first place	2019 Gold Coast	triples
Gold medal – first place	2019 Gold Coast	fours

Aaron Teys (born 7 December 1993) is an international Australian lawn and indoor bowler. He reached a career high ranking of world number 3 in June 2024.

== Bowls career ==
=== World Championships ===
In 2020, he was selected for the 2020 World Outdoor Bowls Championship in Australia but the event was cancelled due to the COVID-19 pandemic.

In 2023, he was selected as part of the team to represent Australia at the 2023 World Outdoor Bowls Championship. He participated in the men's pairs and the men's fours events. In the pairs with Aaron Wilson, they won the silver medal after losing to Ireland in the final. One week later in the fours partnering Corey Wedlock, Carl Healey and Aron Sherriff, the team won their group before reaching the final against Scotland, where he won the gold medal winning 12–10.

=== World Singles Champion of Champions ===
Teys won the 2017 World Singles Champion of Champions defeating Dean Elgar in the final.

=== Asia Pacific ===
Teys won double gold in the triples and fours at the 2019 Asia Pacific Bowls Championships in the Gold Coast, Queensland.

=== National ===
In 2021, he won the fours title with Corey Wedlock, Brendan Aquilina and Jamie Turner at the delayed 2020 Australian National Bowls Championships. He won his first Australian Open in 2023.
