= Aron Sherriff =

Australian lawn bowler (born 1985)

Personal information
- Nationality: Australian
- Born: 29 October 1985 (age 41) Paddington, Australia

Sport
- Sport: Bowls
- Club: Broadbeach

Achievements and titles
- Highest world ranking: 1 (June 2024)
Medal record
Representing Australia
World Outdoor Championships
| Silver medal – second place | 2008 Christchurch | singles |
| Bronze medal – third place | 2008 Christchurch | pairs |
| Silver medal – second place | 2008 Christchurch | team |
| Gold medal – first place | 2012 Adelaide | fours |
| Silver medal – second place | 2012 Adelaide | pairs |
| Gold medal – first place | 2012 Adelaide | team |
| Silver medal – second place | 2016 Christchurch | triples |
| Bronze medal – third place | 2016 Christchurch | singles |
| Silver medal – second place | 2016 Christchurch | team |
| Gold medal – first place | 2023 Gold Coast | triples |
| Gold medal – first place | 2023 Gold Coast | fours |
| Gold medal – first place | 2023 Gold Coast | team |
Commonwealth Games
| Bronze medal – third place | 2014 Glasgow | singles |
| Silver medal – second place | 2018 Gold Coast | triples |
| Silver medal – second place | 2018 Gold Coast | fours |
World Singles Champion of Champions
| Gold medal – first place | 2010 Norfolk Island | Men's Singles |
Asia Pacific Bowls Championships
| Silver medal – second place | 2011 Adelaide | triples |
| Gold medal – first place | 2011 Adelaide | fours |
| Gold medal – first place | 2015 Christchurch | singles |
| Bronze medal – third place | 2015 Christchurch | triples |
| Gold medal – first place | 2019 Gold Coast | triples |
| Gold medal – first place | 2019 Gold Coast | fours |
WB Indoor Championships
| Gold medal – first place | 2023 Warilla | singles |
| Gold medal – first place | 2023 Warilla | mixed pairs |

Aron Sherriff (born 29 October 1985) is an Australian former international lawn and indoor bowler. He won three world championship titles and was ranked world number 1 in June 2024. He reached a career high ranking of world number 1 in March 2024. In October 2024 he announced his retirement from international representation.

== Bowls career ==
=== World Championship ===
==== Outdoor ====
Sherriff won the gold medal in the triples with Mark Casey, Brett Wilkie and Wayne Ruediger during the 2012 World Outdoor Bowls Championship in Adelaide. He also won silver in the pairs with Leif Selby. Four years earlier he had won a silver and bronze at the 2008 World Outdoor Bowls Championship in Christchurch, New Zealand.

In 2016 he was part of the triples team with Barrie Lester and Mark Casey who won the silver medal at the 2016 World Outdoor Bowls Championship in Christchurch and he also won a bronze medal in the singles.

In 2020, he was selected for the 2020 World Outdoor Bowls Championship in Australia but the event was cancelled due to the COVID-19 pandemic.

In 2023, he was selected as part of the team to represent Australia at the 2023 World Outdoor Bowls Championship. He participated in the men's triples and the men's fours events. In the triples with Corey Wedlock and Carl Healey, he won the gold medal. One week later in the fours partnering Wedlock, Healey and Aaron Teys, the team won their group before reaching the final against Scotland, where he won a second gold medal winning 12–10.

==== Indoor ====
In 2023, he won double gold in the singles and the mixed pairs with Kelsey Cottrell at the 2023 World Bowls Indoor Championships.

=== Commonwealth Games ===
He won the lawn bowls bronze medal at the 2014 Commonwealth Games. He won the Bowls Australia Awards Night as the International Bowler of the Year for three consecutive years.

Further success came as part of the Australian team for the 2018 Commonwealth Games on the Gold Coast in Queensland where he took two silver medals in the Triples and in the Fours.

=== Asia Pacific ===
Sherriff has won six medals at the Asia Pacific Bowls Championships, including double gold in the triples and fours at the 2019 Asia Pacific Bowls Championships in the Gold Coast, Queensland.

=== Nationals ===
Sherriff has won three Australian National Bowls Championships titles and nine Australian Opens.

In 2025, Sherriff won his fourth consecutive Australian Open singles title, it was Sherriff's ninth Australian Open title.
