= Ryan Bester =

Canadian lawn bowler (born 1984)

Personal information
- Full name: Ryan George Peter Bester
- Nationality: Canadian
- Born: 7 December 1984 (age 41) Hanover, Ontario, Canada

Sport
- Sport: Bowls
- Club: Hanover LBC / Broadbeach BC
Medal record
Representing Canada
World Outdoor Championships
Gold medal – first place	2004 Ayr	pairs
Bronze medal – third place	2008 Christchurch	singles
Silver medal – second place	2012 Adelaide	singles
Bronze medal – third place	2012 Adelaide	pairs
Silver medal – second place	2016 Christchurch	singles
Gold medal – first place	2023 Gold Coast	singles
Bronze medal – third place	2023 Gold Coast	pairs
Commonwealth Games
Bronze medal – third place	2006 Melbourne	singles
Silver medal – second place	2014 Glasgow	singles
Silver medal – second place	2018 Gold Coast	singles
Asia Pacific Bowls Championships
Gold medal – first place	2005 Melbourne	singles
Silver medal – second place	2007 Christchurch	singles
Bronze medal – third place	2007 Christchurch	pairs
Bronze medal – third place	2011 Adelaide	pairs
Bronze medal – third place	2011 Adelaide	fours
Gold medal – first place	2015 Christchurch	pairs
Silver medal – second place	2019 Gold Coast	singles
Bronze medal – third place	2019 Gold Coast	pairs
Atlantic Bowls Championships
Gold medal – first place	2007 Ayr	singles

Ryan George Peter Bester (born 7 December 1984 in Hanover, Canada) is a Canadian lawn bowler.

== Bowls career ==
=== World Outdoor Championships ===
Bester won the gold medal in the pairs with Keith Roney at the 2004 World Outdoor Bowls Championship in Ayr. After winning a bronze in the 2008 World Outdoor Bowls Championship he finished runner-up to Leif Selby in the 2012 World Outdoor Bowls Championship men's singles. He won his fifth World Championship medal when winning a silver medal in the singles at the 2016 World Outdoor Bowls Championship in Christchurch.

In 2020, he was selected for the 2020 World Outdoor Bowls Championship in Australia but the event was cancelled due to the COVID-19 pandemic.

In 2023, he was selected again by Canada for the 2023 World Outdoor Bowls Championship. He participated in the men's pairs and the men's fours events. In the pairs, Bester qualified in first place with John Bezear in his group before being eliminated at the semi final stage, after losing to Ireland. However one week later, in the singles he went on to win the gold medal after beating Gary Kelly in the final.

=== Commonwealth Games ===
He clinched the silver medal in the 2014 Commonwealth Games in lawn bowling. He also won bronze medal in 2006 Commonwealth Games in Melbourne.

In November 2017, Bester was named to Canada's 2018 Commonwealth Games team. During the 2018 Commonwealth Games on the Gold Coast in Queensland he won a silver medal in the singles. In 2022, he competed in the men's singles and the men's pairs at the 2022 Commonwealth Games.

=== Asia Pacific and Atlantic ===
Bester has won eight medals at the Asia Pacific Bowls Championships, a singles gold in 2005, a silver in the singles and bronze in the pairs in 2007, double bronze in 2011 and a pairs gold in 2015. His seventh and eighth medals came in with a singles silver and pairs bronze at the 2019 Asia Pacific Bowls Championships in the Gold Coast, Queensland. In 2007 he won the singles gold medal at the Atlantic Bowls Championships.
