= Gary Kelly (bowls) =

Northern Irish bowls player (born 1989)

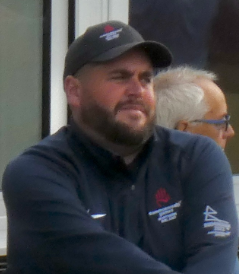
- Kelly at the 2022 Commonwealth Games

Personal information
- Nationality: Irish
- Born: 10 May 1989 (age 37) Ballymoney, Northern Ireland
- Education: Our Lady of Lourdes High School, Ballymoney

Sport
- Sport: bowls
- Club: Ballybrakes Community (indoors); Ballymoney BC / Warilla (outdoors)

Achievements and titles
- Highest world ranking: 2 (August 2026)
Medal record
Representing Northern Ireland
Commonwealth Games
Bronze medal – third place	2010 Delhi	singles
Silver medal – second place	2022 Birmingham	singles
Gold medal – first place	2026 Glasgow	pairs
Bronze medal – third place	2026 Glasgow	singles
Representing Combined Ireland
World Bowls Championship
Silver medal – second place	2016 Christchurch	pairs
Gold medal – first place	2023 Gold Coast	pairs
Silver medal – second place	2023 Gold Coast	singles
Silver medal – second place	2023 Gold Coast	team
World Cup Singles
Gold medal – first place	2019 Warilla	singles
Atlantic Championships
Silver medal – second place	2011 Paphos	pairs
Gold medal – first place	2015 Paphos	pairs
Bronze medal – third place	2015 Paphos	singles
British Isles Championships
Gold medal – first place	2010	pairs
Gold medal – first place	2018	pairs
European Championships
Gold medal – first place	2022 Ayr	singles
Gold medal – first place	2022 Ayr	triples

Gary Kelly (born 10 May 1989) is an Australian-based Irish international indoor and lawn bowler. He reached a career high ranking of world number 2 in August 2026.

== Bowls career ==
=== Outdoors ===
He won a bronze medal in the Men's singles at the 2010 Commonwealth Games. In 2011 he won the pairs silver medal at the Atlantic Bowls Championships and in 2015 he won the pairs gold medal at the Atlantic Bowls Championships.

He won a silver medal for a combined Irish team with bowls pairs partner Ian McClure in the pairs at the 2016 World Outdoor Bowls Championship.

In 2018, he was selected as part of the Northern Ireland team for the 2018 Commonwealth Games on the Gold Coast in Queensland and in 2020 he was selected for the 2020 World Outdoor Bowls Championship in Australia but the event was cancelled due to the COVID-19 pandemic.

In addition to his international successes he also won the 2007 Irish National Bowls Championships singles.

Kelly moved to Australia after the 2018 Commonwealth Games and won the delayed 2020 Australian triples title with Corey Wedlock and Brendan Aquilina at the Australian National Bowls Championships. In 2022, he competed in the men's singles (winning a silver medal) and the men's triples at the 2022 Commonwealth Games. Later in 2022, he won his first title at the Australian Open and also won the singles and triples at the European Bowls Championships.

In 2023, he was selected as part of the team to represent Ireland at the 2023 World Outdoor Bowls Championship. He participated in the men's singles and the men's pairs events. In the pairs with Adam McKeown, they topped their group before going on to win the gold medal, defeating Australia in the final. One week later, in the singles he went on to win the silver medal after losing the final to Ryan Bester. Later in October, Kelly won the Australian Nationals pairs title with Corey Wedlock.

In 2024, Kelly won the Australian Open fours title with Peter Taylor, Ray Pearse and Carl Healey, it was Kelly's second Australian Open title. A third followed in 2025, when winning the pairs with Corey Wedlock.

=== Indoors ===
His first major success indoors came in 2019 after he defeated Brendan Aquilina in the final of the World Cup Singles.

He was part of the winning trio that won the inaugural Ultimate Bowls Championship in April 2019 winning $60,000 AUD in prize money.

Kelly won the bronze medal in the men's singles at the 2026 Commonwealth Games which was played indoors in Glasgow. A few days later he combined with Adam McKeown to win the gold medal in the men's pairs, defeating England's Nick Brett and Jamie Walker on a tiebreak end in the final.
