= Leif Selby =

Australian lawn bowler

Personal information
- Nationality: Australian
- Born: 26 July 1972 (age 53)

Sport
- Sport: Lawn bowls
- Club: Warilla Bowls and Recreation Club BC
Medal record
Commonwealth Games
Silver medal – second place	2010 Delhi	Men's singles
World Outdoor Championships
Gold medal – first place	2012 Adelaide	Men's singles
Silver medal – second place	2012 Adelaide	Men's Pairs
Gold medal – first place	2012 Adelaide	Men's Team
World Singles Champion of Champions
Gold medal – first place	2008 Scotland	Men's Singles
Asia Pacific Bowls Championships
Gold medal – first place	2007 Christchurch	pairs
Gold medal – first place	2007 Christchurch	fours
Gold medal – first place	2009 Kuala Lumpur	triples
Silver medal – second place	2009 Kuala Lumpur	singles

Leif Selby (born 26 July 1972) is a retired Australian Lawn bowler.

== Bowls career ==
He won the lawn bowls gold medal in the singles competition and silver in the pairs with Aron Sherriff at the 2012 World Outdoor Bowls Championship. He also won the silver medal in the singles competition at the 2010 Commonwealth Games.

He twice won the gold medal in 2009 and 2010 at the World Cup Singles in Warilla, New South Wales, Australia.

He won three gold medals and one silver medal at the Asia Pacific Bowls Championships and in 2009, he won the Hong Kong International Bowls Classic singles title.

== Retirement ==
He made a shock announcement in 2012 that he was retiring despite being at the pinnacle of his sport. He had played 142 international games.
