= Northern Ireland at the 2022 Commonwealth Games =

- Flag of Northern Ireland
- CG code: NIR
- CGA: Northern Ireland Commonwealth Games Council
- Website: www.teamni.org

in Birmingham, England 28 July 2022 – 8 August 2022
- Competitors: 93 (40 men and 53 women) in 14 sports
- Flag bearers (opening): Martin McHugh; Michaela Walsh
- Flag bearer (closing): Dylan Eagleson
- Medals Ranked 11th: Gold 7 Silver 7 Bronze 4 Total 18

Commonwealth Games appearances (overview)
- 1934; 1938; 1950; 1954; 1958; 1962; 1966; 1970; 1974; 1978; 1982; 1986; 1990; 1994; 1998; 2002; 2006; 2010; 2014; 2018; 2022; 2026; 2030

Other related appearances
- Ireland (1930)

Northern Ireland competed at the 2022 Commonwealth Games in Birmingham, England between 28 July and 8 August 2022. It was the twentieth Games participation for Northern Ireland.

Lawn bowler Martin McHugh and boxer Michaela Walsh were the delegation's flagbearers during the opening ceremony.

The Games were Northern Ireland's most successful, with them having won their highest number of gold medals, joint highest number of silver medals, and their most medals overall.

== Medalists ==
Medal	Name	Sport	Event	Date
Gold	Bethany Firth	Swimming	Women's 200 metre freestyle S14	3 August
Gold	Sam Barkley; Adam McKeown; Ian McClure; Martin McHugh	Lawn bowls	Men's fours	6 August
Gold	Dylan Eagleson	Boxing	Men's bantamweight	7 August
Gold	Aidan Walsh	Boxing	Men's light middleweight	7 August
Gold	Amy Broadhurst	Boxing	Women's lightweight	7 August
Gold	Jude Gallagher	Boxing	Men's featherweight	7 August
Gold	Michaela Walsh	Boxing	Women's featherweight	7 August
Silver	Chloe MacCombe; Guide: Catherine A Sands	Triathlon	Women's PTVI	31 July
Silver	Rhys McClenaghan	Gymnastics	Men's pommel horse	1 August
Silver	Daniel Wiffen	Swimming	Men's 1500 metre freestyle	3 August
Silver	Kate O'Connor	Athletics	Women's heptathlon	3 August
Silver	Gary Kelly	Lawn bowls	Men's singles	6 August
Silver	Carly McNaul	Boxing	Women's light flyweight	7 August
Silver	Ciara Mageean	Athletics	Women's 1500 metres	7 August
Bronze	Barry McClements	Swimming	Men's 100 metre backstroke S9	29 July
Bronze	Nathon Burns	Judo	Men's 66 kg	1 August
Bronze	Yasmin Javadian	Judo	Women's 52 kg	1 August
Bronze	Eireann Nugent	Boxing	Women's light middleweight	6 August

Medals by sport
Sport	Gold medal	Silver medal	Bronze medal	Total
Athletics	0	2	0	2
Boxing	5	1	1	7
Gymnastics	0	1	0	1
Judo	0	0	2	2
Lawn Bowls	1	1	0	2
Swimming	1	1	1	3
Triathlon	0	1	0	1
Total	7	7	4	18

Medals by date
Date	Gold medal	Silver medal	Bronze medal	Total
29 July	0	0	1	1
31 July	0	1	0	1
1 August	0	1	2	3
3 August	1	2	0	3
6 August	1	1	1	3
7 August	5	2	0	7
Total	7	7	4	18

Medals by gender
Gender	Gold medal	Silver medal	Bronze medal	Total
Male	4	3	2	9
Female	3	4	2	9
Mixed / open	0	0	0	0
Total	7	7	4	18

== Competitors ==
The following is the list of number of competitors participating at the Games per sport/discipline.

Sport	Men	Women	Total
Athletics	3	9	12
Badminton	0	1	1
3x3 basketball	4	0	4
Boxing	7	5	12
Cycling	4	3	7
Diving	0	1	1
Gymnastics	3	0	3
Judo	4	3	7
Lawn bowls	5	5	10
Netball	—N/a	12	12
Swimming	3	7	10
Table tennis	4	1	5
Triathlon	3	4	7
Weightlifting	0	2	2
Total	40	53	93

== Athletics ==
One para athlete was officially selected on 19 May 2022. Another para athlete and thirteen other athletes were added on 21 June 2022.

On 12 July 2022, CGNI declared that Leon Reid was barred from competing in the Games by BOCCG following a security risk assessment. On 26 July, Paul Pollock withdrew from the Games.

Men
Track and road events

Athlete	Event	Final	
Athlete	Event	Result	Rank
Kevin Seaward	Marathon	2:16:54	9
Stephen Scullion	Marathon	2:17:51	10
Mark Millar	Marathon T54	1:58:48	6

Women
Track and road events

Athlete	Event	Heat		Final	
Athlete	Event	Result	Rank	Result	Rank
Eve Walsh-Dann	100 m T38	14.04	5	Did not advance	
Ciara Mageean	1500 m	4:13.52	1 Q	4:04.14	2nd place, silver medalist(s)
Roisin Flanagan	5000 m	—N/a		15:26.76	11
Hannah Irwin	10,000 m	—N/a		DNF	
Megan Marrs	100 m hurdles	13.37	4	Did not advance	
Eilish Flanagan	3000 m steeplechase	—N/a		9:57.18	6

Field events

Athlete	Event	Final	
Athlete	Event	Distance	Rank
Ellie McCartney	Pole vault	4.25	7

Combined events – Heptathlon

Athlete	Event	100H	HJ	SP	200 m	LJ	JT	800 m	Final	Rank
Anna McCauley	Result	14.68	1.75	11.36	25.40	5.68	34.87	2:19.16	5426	6
Anna McCauley	Points	884	916	619	850	753	569	835	5426	6
Kate O'Connor	Result	13.74	1.78	13.73	24.73	5.82	51.14	2:14.48	6233	2nd place, silver medalist(s)
Kate O'Connor	Points	1015	953	776	912	795	882	900	6233	2nd place, silver medalist(s)

== Badminton ==
One player (Rachael Darragh) was officially selected on 15 July 2022.

Athlete	Event	Round of 64	Round of 32	Round of 16	Quarterfinal	Semifinal	Final / BM	
Athlete	Event	Opposition Score	Opposition Score	Opposition Score	Opposition Score	Opposition Score	Opposition Score	Rank
Rachael Darragh	Women's singles	Bye	Dookhee (MRI); W (21–10, 21–8)	Laurens Jordaan (RSA); W (21–13, 21–5)	Li (CAN); L (14–21, 14–21)	Did not advance		

== 3x3 basketball ==
On 14 April 2022, Northern Ireland qualified for the men's 3x3 wheelchair basketball tournament by virtue of winning the men's IWBF European Qualifier in Largs, Scotland.

Squad selections were officially announced on 19 May 2022.

Summary

Team	Event	Preliminary round			Semifinal	Final / BM / PM	
Team	Event	Opposition Result	Opposition Result	Rank	Opposition Result	Opposition Result	Rank
Northern Ireland wheelchair men	Men's tournament	Canada; L 5 - 13	Australia; W 11 - 9	3	—N/a	South Africa; W 10–7	5

=== Men's wheelchair tournament ===
Roster

- Matt Rollston
- Nathan McCabe
- Conn Nagle
- James MacSorley

Group B

Pos	Team	Pld	W	L	PF	PA	PD	Qualification
1	Canada	2	1	1	24	18	+6	Semi-finals
2	Australia	2	1	1	24	24	0	Semi-finals
3	Northern Ireland	2	1	1	16	22	−6	5th place match

Source: Birmingham 2022
Rules for classification: 1) Wins; 2) Head-to-head record; 3) Points scored.

30 July 2022
19:30

Report

Northern Ireland	5–13	Canada
Pts: McCabe 3		Pts: Higgins 6

Smithfield

31 July 2022
19:30

Report

Australia	9–11	Northern Ireland
Pts: Dalton, Pople 5		Pts: Nagle 5

Smithfield

5th place match

2 August 2022
15:00

Report

Northern Ireland	10–7	South Africa
Pts: Macsorley 6		Pts: Mbhele 7

Smithfield

== Boxing ==
A squad of thirteen boxers (eight men, five women) was officially selected on 4 May 2022. Damien Sullivan withdrew from the Games.

Men

Athlete	Event	Round of 32	Round of 16	Quarterfinals	Semifinals	Final	
Athlete	Event	Opposition Result	Opposition Result	Opposition Result	Opposition Result	Opposition Result	Rank
Clepson Paiva	Flyweight	—N/a	Addo (GHA); W 3 - 2	Dodd (WAL); L RSC	Did not advance		
Dylan Eagleson	Bantamweight	—N/a		Sigauque (MOZ); W 5 - 0	McHale (SCO); W 3 - 2	Mensah (GHA); W 5 - 0	1st place, gold medalist(s)
Jude Gallagher	Featherweight	Dlamini (SWZ); W 5 - 0	Farrell (ENG); W RSC	Hussain (PAK); W 5 - 0	Al-Ahmadieh (CAN); W WO	Commey (GHA); W WO	1st place, gold medalist(s)
John Paul Hale	Light welterweight	Tukamuhebwa (UGA); L 2 - 3	Did not advance				
Eugene McKeever	Welterweight	—N/a	Zimba (ZAM); L RSC-I	Did not advance			
Aidan Walsh	Light middleweight	—N/a	Pakela (LES); W 5 - 0	Akbar (ENG); W 3 - 2	Croft (WAL); W 4 - 1	Muxanga (MOZ); W 5 - 0	1st place, gold medalist(s)
Jake Tucker	Middleweight	—N/a	Le Poullain (GGY); L 2 - 3	Did not advance			

Women

Athlete	Event	Round of 16	Quarterfinals	Semifinals	Final	
Athlete	Event	Opposition Result	Opposition Result	Opposition Result	Opposition Result	Rank
Nicole Clyde	Minimumweight	—N/a	Nitu (IND); L ABD	Did not advance		
Carly McNaul	Light flyweight	Harris (AUS); W 3 - 2	Hansika (SRI); W 5 - 0	Nakimuli (UGA); W 5 - 0	Zareen (IND); L 0- 5	2nd place, silver medalist(s)
Michaela Walsh	Featherweight	—N/a	Kenosi (BOT); W 5 - 0	Mnguni (RSA); W 5 - 0	Oshoba (NGR); W 5 - 0	1st place, gold medalist(s)
Amy Broadhurst	Lightweight	—N/a	Nkandu (ZAM); W RSC	Ogunsemilore (NGR); W 5 - 0	Richardson (ENG); W 5 - 0	1st place, gold medalist(s)
Eireann Nugent	Light middleweight	—N/a	Wilkinson (ENG); W 4 - 0	Eccles (WAL); L 0 - 5	Did not advance	3rd place, bronze medalist(s)

== Cycling ==
A squad of eight cyclists was officially selected on 30 June 2022. JB Murphy and Lydia Boylan withdrew from the squad due to injury.

=== Road ===
Men

Athlete	Event	Time	Rank
Christopher McGlinchey	Road race	3:37:08	39
Cameron Orr	Road race	3:37:08	52
Darren Rafferty	Road race	3:37:08	35
Matthew Teggart	Road race	3:28:29	4
Darren Rafferty	Time trial	49:10.80	8

Women

Athlete	Event	Time	Rank
Alice Sharpe	Road race	2:44:46	15
Jo Patterson	Time trial	4:42.75	19

=== Track ===
Points race

Athlete	Event	Final	
Athlete	Event	Points	Rank
Lydia Boylan	Women's points race	DNS	
Alice Sharpe	Women's points race	6	11

Scratch race

Athlete	Event	Final
Lydia Boylan	Women's scratch race	DNS
Alice Sharpe	Women's scratch race	5

=== Mountain Biking ===
Athlete	Event	Time	Rank
Christopher McGlinchey	Men's cross-country	1:40:19	9
Cameron Orr	Men's cross-country	1:36:29	4

== Diving ==
One diver (Tanya Watson) was officially selected on 1 June 2022.

Athlete	Events	Semifinal		Final	
Athlete	Events	Points	Rank	Points	Rank
Tanya Watson	Women's 10 m platform	266.55	10 Q	282.25	10

== Gymnastics ==
=== Artistic ===
Men
Individual Qualification

Athlete	Event	Apparatus						Total	Rank
Athlete	Event	F	PH	R	V	PB	HB	Total	Rank
Ewan McAteer	Qualification	—N/a			13.950 Q	—N/a			
Rhys McClenaghan	Qualification	—N/a	14.350 Q	—N/a					
Eamon Montgomery	Qualification	13.750 Q	—N/a						

Individual Finals

Athlete	Event	Apparatus						Total	Rank
Athlete	Event	F	PH	R	V	PB	HB	Total	Rank
Eamon Montgomery	Floor	13.666	—N/a					13.666	5
Rhys McClenaghan	Pommel horse	—N/a	14.133	—N/a				14.133	2nd place, silver medalist(s)
Ewan McAteer	Vault	—N/a			13.750	—N/a		13.750	6

== Judo ==
A squad of seven judoka (four men, three women) was officially selected on 28 April 2022.

Men

Athlete	Event	Round of 32	Round of 16	Quarterfinals	Semifinals	Repechage	Final/BM	
Athlete	Event	Opposition Result	Opposition Result	Opposition Result	Opposition Result	Opposition Result	Opposition Result	Rank
Nathon Burns	-66 kg	—N/a	Edwin (NGR); W 10 - 0	Saini (IND); L 0 - 10	—N/a	Mungandu (ZAM); W 1 - 0	Short (SCO); W 10 - 0	3rd place, bronze medalist(s)
Callum Nash	-66 kg	—N/a	Balarjishvili (CYP); L 0 - 1	Did not advance				
Joshua Green	-73 kg	—N/a	Boyce (TTO); W 11 - 0	Matsoukatov (CYP); L 0 - 10	—N/a	Repiyallage (SRI); W 10 - 0	Bensted (AUS); L 0 - 10	5
Eoin Fleming	-81 kg	—N/a	Georgiakis (CYP); W 10 - 0	Kosam (NRU); W 10 - 0	Gauthier-Drapeau (CAN); L 0 - 10	—N/a	Nikolic (AUS); L 1 - 10	5

Women

Athlete	Event	Round of 16	Quarterfinals	Semifinals	Repechage	Final/BM	
Athlete	Event	Opposition Result	Opposition Result	Opposition Result	Opposition Result	Opposition Result	Rank
Yasmin Javadian	-52 kg	—N/a	Griesel (RSA); W 01- 0	Easton (AUS); L 0 - 1	—N/a	Ferreira (MOZ); W 1 - 0	3rd place, bronze medalist(s)
Rachael Hawkes	-70 kg	—N/a	Drysdale-Daley (JAM); L 0 - 10	—N/a		Yeats-Brown (ENG); L 0 - 10	5
Sarah Hawkes	+78 kg	—N/a	Paduch (AUS); L 0 - 10	—N/a	Kana (KEN); W 10 - 0	Andrews (NZL); L 0 - 10	5

== Lawn bowls ==
A squad of ten bowlers (five per gender) was officially selected on 28 February 2022.

Men

Athlete	Event	Group stage					Quarterfinal	Semifinal	Final / BM	
Athlete	Event	Opposition Score	Opposition Score	Opposition Score	Opposition Score	Rank	Opposition Score	Opposition Score	Opposition Score	Rank
Gary Kelly	Singles	Dixon (NFK); W 21 - 12	Salmon (WAL); W 21 - 12	Tagelagi (NIU); W 21 - 14	Bester (CAN); W 21–13	1 Q	Evans (RSA); W 21–12	Muin (MAS); W 21–15	Wilson (AUS); L 3-21	2nd place, silver medalist(s)
Sam Barkley; Martin McHugh	Pairs	Norfolk Island; L 15 - 20	Namibia; W 27 - 6	Wales; W 14 - 11	Jamaica; W 26 - 7	1 Q	India; W 26 - 8	Wales; L 14 - 22	Scotland; L 5 - 25	4
Adam McKeown; Gary Kelly; Ian McClure	Triples	Norfolk Island; W 24 - 10	Wales; T 15 - 15	Fiji; L 15 - 20	—N/a	3	Did not advance			
Sam Barkley; Adam McKeown; Ian McClure; Martin McHugh	Fours	Canada; L 12 - 13	Niue; W 21 - 7	Australia; W 12 - 8	—N/a	2 Q	Scotland; W 18 - 15	Wales; W 18 - 9	India; W 18 - 5	1st place, gold medalist(s)

Women

Athlete	Event	Group stage					Quarterfinal	Semifinal	Final / BM	
Athlete	Event	Opposition Score	Opposition Score	Opposition Score	Opposition Score	Rank	Opposition Score	Opposition Score	Opposition Score	Rank
Shauna O'Neill	Singles	Hoggan (SCO); L 14 - 21	Arthur-Almond (FLK); W 21 - 2	Daniels (WAL); L 19 - 21	Tania (IND); L 12 - 21	3	Did not advance			
Megan Devlin; Shauna O'Neill	Pairs	England; L 13 - 14	Scotland; W 18 - 12	Fiji; L 16 - 17	—N/a	2 Q	Malaysia; L 11 - 15	Did not advance		
Ashleigh Rainey; Courtney Meneely; Chloe Wilson	Triples	Falkland Islands; W 22 - 10	South Africa; W 15 - 14	Singapore; W 23 - 13	Australia; L 9 - 19	2 Q	England; L 11–25	Did not advance		
Megan Devlin; Ashleigh Rainey; Courtney Meneely; Chloe Wilson	Fours	Malta; W 16 - 10	Malaysia; W 13 - 10	Norfolk Island; L 6 - 17	—N/a	2 Q	Fiji; L 12 - 15	Did not advance		

== Netball ==
By virtue of its position in the World Netball Rankings (as of 31 January 2022), Northern Ireland qualified for the tournament.

Complete fixtures were announced in March 2022.

Summary

Team	Event	Group stage						Semifinal	Final / BM / Cl.	
Team	Event	Opposition Result	Opposition Result	Opposition Result	Opposition Result	Opposition Result	Rank	Opposition Result	Opposition Result	Rank
Northern Ireland (NIR)	Women's tournament	New Zealand; L 20 - 79	Malawi; L 41 - 54	England; L 27 - 71	Uganda; L 26 - 63	Trinidad and Tobago; W 41 - 32	5	—N/a	Scotland; L 33 - 43	10

Roster

Twelve players were selected on 6 June 2022.

- Jenna Bowman
- Ciara Crosbie
- Emma Magee
- Georgie McGrath
- Caroline O'Hanlon
- Michelle Drayne
- Niamh Cooper
- Frances Keenan
- Fionnuala Toner
- Michelle Magee
- Olivia McDonald
- Maria McCann

Group play

Pos	Team	Pld	W	D	L	GF	GA	GD	Pts	Qualification
1	England (H)	5	5	0	0	321	169	+152	10	Semi-finals
2	New Zealand	5	4	0	1	325	188	+137	8	Semi-finals
3	Uganda	5	3	0	2	256	206	+50	6	Classification matches
4	Malawi	5	2	0	3	258	262	−4	4	Classification matches
5	Northern Ireland	5	1	0	4	155	299	−144	2	Classification matches
6	Trinidad and Tobago	5	0	0	5	136	327	−191	0	Classification matches

Source: Birmingham 2022
(H) Hosts

29 July 2022; 20:00	Report	New Zealand	79–20	Northern Ireland	National Exhibition Centre; Umpires: Anso Kemp; Joshua Bowring
29 July 2022; 20:00	Report	Mes 5/13 (38%); Nweke 29/31 (94%); Selby-Rickit 25/27 (93%); Wilson 20/22 (91%)		Bowman 4/7 (57%); Crosbie 9/16 (56%); Magee 6/10 (60%); McGrath 1/3 (33%)	National Exhibition Centre; Umpires: Anso Kemp; Joshua Bowring

31 July 2022; 12:00	Report	Malawi	54–41	Northern Ireland	National Exhibition Centre; Umpires: Angela Armstrong-Lush; Tracy-Ann Griffiths
31 July 2022; 12:00	Report	Chimaliro 4/4 (100%); Kumwenda 29/32 (91%); Mvula 15/19 (79%); Simtowe 6/6 (100%)		Bowman 1/3 (33%); Crosbie 18/22 (82%); Magee 22/27 (81%)	National Exhibition Centre; Umpires: Angela Armstrong-Lush; Tracy-Ann Griffiths

1 August 2022; 18:00	Report	England	71–27	Northern Ireland	National Exhibition Centre; Umpires: Alison Harrison; Bronwen Adams
1 August 2022; 18:00	Report	Cardwell 40/45 (89%); Drakeford-Lewis 11/12 (92%); Housby 20/20 (100%)		Bowman 8/11 (73%); Crosbie 8/12 (67%); Magee 9/13 (69%); McGrath 2/2 (100%)	National Exhibition Centre; Umpires: Alison Harrison; Bronwen Adams

3 August 2022; 12:00	Report	Uganda	63–26	Northern Ireland	National Exhibition Centre; Umpires: Tracy-Ann Griffiths; Gary Burgess
3 August 2022; 12:00	Report	Cholhok 41/46 (89%); Eyaru 8/9 (89%); Nassanga 14/15 (93%)		Bowman 2/8 (25%); Crosbie 14/20 (70%); Magee 7/11 (64%); McGrath 3/5 (60%)	National Exhibition Centre; Umpires: Tracy-Ann Griffiths; Gary Burgess

4 August 2022; 14:00	Report	Trinidad and Tobago	32–41	Northern Ireland	National Exhibition Centre; Umpires: Anso Kemp; Alison Harrison
4 August 2022; 14:00	Report	Cooper 7/9 (78%); Hollingsworth 7/9 (78%); Noel 18/18 (100%)		Bowman 4/8 (50%); Crosbie 27/34 (79%); Magee 8/14 (57%); McGrath 2/3 (67%)	National Exhibition Centre; Umpires: Anso Kemp; Alison Harrison

Ninth place match

5 August 2022; 11:30	Report	Scotland	43–33	Northern Ireland	National Exhibition Centre; Umpires: Louise Travis; Alison Harrison
5 August 2022; 11:30	Report	Goodwin 23/27 (85%); McCall 20/26 (77%)		Bowman 4/8 (50%); Crosbie 17/24 (71%); Magee 12/17 (71%)	National Exhibition Centre; Umpires: Louise Travis; Alison Harrison

== Swimming ==
A squad of three para swimmers was selected on 19 May 2022, all having qualified via the World Para Swimming World Rankings for performances registered between 31 December 2020 and 18 April 2022. Seven swimmers were added to the squad on 1 June 2022.

Men

Athlete	Event	Heat		Semifinal		Final	
Athlete	Event	Time	Rank	Time	Rank	Time	Rank
Jack McMillan	100 m freestyle	49.61	11	49.69	11	Did not advance	
Jack McMillan	200 m freestyle	1:48.51	9	—N/a		Did not advance	
Daniel Wiffen	400 m freestyle	3:47.43	1	—N/a		3:46.62	4
Daniel Wiffen	1500 m freestyle	15:37.53	5	—N/a		14:51.79	2nd place, silver medalist(s)
Barry McClements	100 m backstroke S9	—N/a				1:05.09	3rd place, bronze medalist(s)
Barry McClements	100 m butterfly S10	—N/a				1:02.47	7
Jack McMillan	200 m individual medley	DNS		—N/a		Did not advance	

Women

Athlete	Event	Heat		Semifinal		Final	
Athlete	Event	Time	Rank	Time	Rank	Time	Rank
Grace Davison	50 m freestyle	27.08	25	Did not advance			
Danielle Hill	50 m freestyle	25.29	6	25.15	6	25.36	7
Mollie McAlorum	50 m freestyle	27.15	27	Did not advance			
Victoria Catterson	100 m freestyle	55.97	12	56.04	13	Did not advance	
Danielle Hill	100 m freestyle	DNS		Did not advance			
Kaitlyn McCaw	100 m freestyle	58.26	25	Did not advance			
Victoria Catterson	200 m freestyle	1:59.86	7	—N/a		2:00.65	8
Grace Davison	200 m freestyle	2:10.00	19	—N/a		Did not advance	
Bethany Firth	200 m freestyle	2:08.34	18	—N/a		Did not advance	
Bethany Firth	200 m freestyle S14	—N/a				2:07.02	1st place, gold medalist(s)
Mollie McAlorum	400 m freestyle	4:32.31	15	—N/a		Did not advance	
Grace Davison	50 m backstroke	30.49	20	Did not advance			
Danielle Hill	50 m backstroke	28.32	7	28.28	7 Q	28.29	7
Mollie McAlorum	50 m backstroke	31.77	22	Did not advance			
Danielle Hill	100 m backstroke	1:01.85	8	1:01.74	9	Did not advance	
Siomha Brady	100 m backstroke S8	—N/a				1:34.08	7
Siomha Brady	50 m breaststroke	DNS		Did not advance			
Grace Davison	50 m butterfly	DNS		Did not advance			
Danielle Hill	50 m butterfly	26.92	9	26.65	9	Did not advance	
Kaitlyn McCaw	50 m butterfly	28.07	23	Did not advance			
Kaitlyn McCaw	100 m butterfly	1:02.60	24	Did not advance			
Grace Davison	200 m individual medley	2:22.34	12	—N/a		Did not advance	
Mollie McAlorum	200 m individual medley	DNS		—N/a		Did not advance	
Victoria Catterson; Grace Davison; Mollie McAlorum; Danielle Hill	4 × 100 m freestyle relay	—N/a				3:47.24	6

== Table tennis ==
Singles

Athletes	Event	Group stage			Round of 32	Round of 16	Quarterfinal	Semifinal	Final / BM	
Athletes	Event	Opposition Score	Opposition Score	Rank	Opposition Score	Opposition Score	Opposition Score	Opposition Score	Opposition Score	Rank
Owen Cathcart	Men's singles	Britton (GUY); W 4 - 0	Bawm (BAN); W 4 - 0	1 Q	Quek (SGP); L 1 - 4	Did not advance				
Paul McCreery	Men's singles	Sultan (SEY); W 4 - 1	Elia (CYP); W 4 - 1	1 Q	Gnanasekaran (IND); L 0 - 4	Did not advance				
Zak Wilson	Men's singles	Luu (AUS); L 0 - 4	van Lange (GUY); W 4 - 1	2	Did not advance					
Sophie Earley	Women's singles	Bristol (SEY); W 4 - 0	Greaves (GUY); W 4 - 0	1 Q	Zhou (SGP); W 4 - 3	Zhang (CAN); L 3 - 4	Did not advance			

Doubles

Athletes	Event	Round of 64	Round of 32	Round of 16	Quarterfinal	Semifinal	Final / BM	
Athletes	Event	Opposition Score	Opposition Score	Opposition Score	Opposition Score	Opposition Score	Opposition Score	Rank
James Skelton; Owen Cathcart	Men's doubles	—N/a	Canada (Chen / Wang); L 0 - 3	Did not advance				
Zak Wilson; Paul McCreery	Men's doubles	Malaysia (Choong / Wong); W 3–2	Canada (Hazin / Ly); L 0–3	Did not advance				
Sophie Earley; Owen Cathcart	Mixed doubles	Seychelles (Bristol / Sultan); W 3 - 0	India (Akula / Sharath); L 0 - 3	Did not advance				

Team

Athletes	Event	Group stage				Quarterfinal	Semifinal	Final / BM	
Athletes	Event	Opposition Score	Opposition Score	Opposition Score	Rank	Opposition Score	Opposition Score	Opposition Score	Rank
Zak Wilson; Paul McCreery; Owen Cathcart; James Skelton	Men's team	Singapore; L 0 - 3	Barbados; W 3 - 0	India; L 0 - 3	3	Did not advance			

== Triathlon ==
A squad of three paratriathletes (plus one guide) was selected on 19 May 2022, all having qualified via the World Triathlon Para Rankings (as of 28 March 2022). Two more guides were confirmed as of 19 June 2022, plus one triathlete on 11 July 2022.

Individual

Athlete	Event	Swim (750 m)	Trans 1	Bike (20 km)	Trans 2	Run (5 km)	Total	Rank
James Edgar	Men's	8:42	0:51	26:18	0:19	16:50	53:00	16

Paratriathlon

Athlete	Event	Swim (750 m)	Trans 1	Bike (20 km)	Trans 2	Run (5 km)	Total	Rank
Oliver Gunning; Guide: Kyle Duncan	Men's PTVI	13:03	1:15	35:45	0:37	24:09	1:17:35	9
Chloe MacCombe; Guide: Catherine Sands	Women's PTVI	14:53	1:44	32:37	0:43	21:23	1:14:39	2nd place, silver medalist(s)
Judith MacCombe; Guide: Anne Paul	Women's PTVI	17:38	1:42	33:42	0:42	21:27	1:18:30	4

== Weightlifting ==
Two weightlifters were selected on 11 April 2022. They qualified through their positions in the IWF Commonwealth Ranking List.

Athlete	Event	Weight lifted		Total	Rank
Athlete	Event	Snatch	Clean & jerk	Total	Rank
Hannah Crymble	Women's 59 kg	83	103	186	6
Caroline Doyle	Women's 64 kg	78	101	179	9

== See also ==
- Ireland at the 2020 Summer Olympics
- Ireland at the 2022 Winter Olympics
