= Guernsey at the 2022 Commonwealth Games =

- Flag of Guernsey
- CG code: GGY
- CGA: Guernsey Commonwealth Games Association
- Website: guernseycga.gg

in Birmingham, England 28 July 2022 – 8 August 2022
- Competitors: 28 (18 men and 10 women) in 7 sports
- Flag bearers: Marc Cox; Elena Johnson
- Medals Ranked =33rd: Gold 0 Silver 1 Bronze 1 Total 2

Commonwealth Games appearances (overview)
- 1970; 1974; 1978; 1982; 1986; 1990; 1994; 1998; 2002; 2006; 2010; 2014; 2018; 2022; 2026; 2030

Guernsey competed at the 2022 Commonwealth Games in Birmingham, England between 28 July and 8 August 2022. Having made its Games debut in 1970, it was Guernsey's fourteenth appearance to date.

Guernsey's team consisted of 28 athletes. Cyclist Marc Cox and badminton player Elena Johnson were the country's flagbearers during the opening ceremony.

On 1 August, lawn bowler Lucy Beere won the territory's first medal in 28 years, by winning the silver medal in the women's singles event. Five days later, Alastair Chalmers won the bronze in the men's 400 metre hurdles to claim the islands' first Commonwealth Games medal in athletics.

== Medallists ==
Medal	Name	Sport	Event	Date
Silver	Lucy Beere	Lawn bowls	Women's singles	1 August
Bronze	Alastair Chalmers	Athletics	Men's 400 metres hurdles	6 August

== Competitors ==
Guernsey received a quota of 28 open allocation slots from Commonwealth Sport. This quota is used to determine the overall team in sports lacking a qualifying system.

The following is the list of number of competitors participating at the Games per sport/discipline.

Sport	Men	Women	Total
Athletics	4	1	5
Badminton	1	3	4
Boxing	1	0	1
Cycling	5	0	5
Lawn bowls	2	2	4
Swimming	4	4	8
Triathlon	1	0	1
Total	18	10	28

== Athletics ==
Two athletes were officially selected on 11 November 2021, with three others added on 4 March 2022.

Men
Track and road events

Athlete	Event	Heat		Semifinal		Final	
Athlete	Event	Result	Rank	Result	Rank	Result	Rank
Joe Chadwick	100 m	10.60	5	did not advance			
Joe Chadwick	200 m	21.54	6	did not advance			
Cameron Chalmers	400 m	47.49	4	did not advance			
Alastair Chalmers	400 m hurdles	50.39	4 q	—N/a		49.97	3rd place, bronze medalist(s)
Peter Curtis	400 m hurdles	52.57	5	—N/a		did not advance	

Women
Track and road events

Athlete	Event	Heat		Semifinal		Final	
Athlete	Event	Result	Rank	Result	Rank	Result	Rank
Abi Galpin	200 m	24.47	3 Q	24.10	7	did not advance	

== Badminton ==
Four players were officially selected on 4 March 2022.

Athlete	Event	Round of 64	Round of 32	Round of 16	Quarterfinal	Semifinal	Final / BM	
Athlete	Event	Opposition Score	Opposition Score	Opposition Score	Opposition Score	Opposition Score	Opposition Score	Rank
Emily Trebert	Women's singles	Bodha (MRI); L (7–21, 12–21)	did not advance					
Elena Johnson; Chloe le Tissier	Women's doubles	—N/a	Bye	Chen / Somerville (AUS); L (9–21, 7–21)	did not advance			
Stuart Hardy; Chloe le Tissier	Mixed doubles	Bye	Angus / Wynter (JAM); L (17–21, 11–21)	did not advance				

== Boxing ==
One boxer (Billy Le Poullain) was officially selected on 4 March 2022.

Men

Athlete	Event	Round of 32	Round of 16	Quarterfinals	Semifinals	Final	
Athlete	Event	Opposition Result	Opposition Result	Opposition Result	Opposition Result	Opposition Result	Rank
Billy le Poullain	Middleweight	Bye	Tucker (NIR); W 3-2	Richardson (ENG); L 0-5	did not advance		

== Cycling ==
Three cyclists were officially selected on 11 November 2021, with three others added on 4 March 2022.

=== Road ===
Men

Athlete	Event	Time	Rank
Marc Cox	Road race	3:37:18	56
Samuel Culverwell	Road race	3:28:53	9
James Roe	Road race	3:37:08	40
Michael Serafin	Road race	3:37:08	43
Sebastian Tremlett	Road race	DNF	
Marc Cox	Time trial	55:02.35	31
Samuel Culverwell	Time trial	52:36.52	21
Sebastian Tremlett	Time trial	52:58.23	23

=== Mountain Biking ===
Athlete	Event	Time	Rank
James Roe	Men’s cross-country	LAP	
Michael Serafin	Men’s cross-country	LAP	

== Lawn bowls ==
Four players were officially selected on 4 March 2022.

Men

Athlete	Event	Group Stage					Quarterfinal	Semifinal	Final / BM	
Athlete	Event	Opposition Score	Opposition Score	Opposition Score	Opposition Score	Rank	Opposition Score	Opposition Score	Opposition Score	Rank
Todd Priaulx	Singles	Wilson (AUS); L 7-21	Evans (RSA); L 16-21	Kimani (KEN); L 11-21	Jim (COK); W 21-17	5	did not advance			
Todd Priaulx; Matt Solway	Pairs	Australia; L 7–29	South Africa; L 13–21	Fiji; L 14–25	—N/a	4	did not advance			

Women

Athlete	Event	Group Stage					Quarterfinal	Semifinal	Final / BM	
Athlete	Event	Opposition Score	Opposition Score	Opposition Score	Opposition Score	Rank	Opposition Score	Opposition Score	Opposition Score	Rank
Lucy Beere	Singles	Kos (CAN); W 21–7	Ryan (AUS); W 21–11	Mbugua (KEN); W 21–16	—N/a	1 Q	Inch (NZL); W 21–16	Ahmad (MAS); W 21–15	Ryan (AUS); L 17–21	2nd place, silver medalist(s)
Lucy Beere; Rose Ogier	Pairs	Malaysia; L 19―22	Cook Islands; W 18―10	Malta; T 17―17	Norfolk Island; W 20―10	3	did not advance			

== Swimming ==
Eight swimmers were officially selected on 4 March 2022.

Men

Athlete	Event	Heat		Semifinal		Final	
Athlete	Event	Time	Rank	Time	Rank	Time	Rank
Jonathan Beck	50 m freestyle	24.28	33	did not advance			
Ronny Hallett	50 m freestyle	24.15	31	did not advance			
Jonathan Beck	100 m freestyle	54.94	55	did not advance			
Samuel Lowe	200 m freestyle	1:59.45	31	—N/a		did not advance	
Samuel Lowe	400 m freestyle	4:14.62	21	—N/a		did not advance	
Samuel Lowe	200 m backstroke	2:11.73	17	—N/a		did not advance	
Charlie-Joe Hallett	50 m breaststroke	28.49	18	did not advance			
Ronny Hallett	50 m breaststroke	29.58	27	did not advance			
Charlie-Joe Hallett	100 m breaststroke	1:03.82	21	did not advance			
Ronny Hallett	100 m breaststroke	1:05.85	28	did not advance			
Charlie-Joe Hallett	200 m breaststroke	2:24.01	14	—N/a		did not advance	
Ronny Hallett	200 m breaststroke	2:26.46	15	—N/a		did not advance	
Charlie-Joe Hallett	100 m butterfly	56.83	28	did not advance			
Samuel Lowe	200 m individual medley	2:13.06	19	—N/a		did not advance	
Charlie-Joe Hallett; Samuel Lowe; Ronny Hallett; Jonathan Beck	4 × 100 m freestyle relay	3:35.27	10	—N/a		did not advance	
Samuel Lowe; Ronny Hallett; Charlie-Joe Hallett; Jonathan Back	4 × 100 m medley relay	3:59.47	7 Q	—N/a		3:56.27	7

Women

Athlete	Event	Heat		Semifinal		Final	
Athlete	Event	Time	Rank	Time	Rank	Time	Rank
Laura le Cras	50 m freestyle	27.72	34	did not advance			
Orla Rabey	50 m freestyle	27.47	33	did not advance			
Molly Staples	50 m freestyle	28.02	40	did not advance			
Orla Rabey	100 m freestyle	58.67	27	did not advance			
Molly Staples	100 m freestyle	1:00.65	35	did not advance			
Tatiana Tostevin	100 m freestyle	1:00.05	32	did not advance			
Tatiana Tostevin	50 m backstroke	30.06	16 Q	29.90	14	did not advance	
Tatiana Tostevin	100 m backstroke	1:03.50	13 Q	1:03.99	14	did not advance	
Laura le Cras	50 m breaststroke	33.09	15 Q	33.26	16	did not advance	
Laura le Cras	100 m breaststroke	1:15.27	20	did not advance			
Laura le Cras	50 m butterfly	Disqualified		did not advance			
Orla Rabey	50 m butterfly	28.45	25	did not advance			
Molly Staples	50 m butterfly	29.29	32	did not advance			
Orla Rabey	100 m butterfly	1:02.37	23	did not advance			
Molly Staples	100 m butterfly	1:07.54	30	did not advance			
Orla Rabey	200 m butterfly	2:20.18	13	—N/a		did not advance	
Laura le Cras; Molly Staples; Tatiana Tostevin; Orla Rabey	4 × 100 m freestyle relay	—N/a				3:59.17	7
Tatiana Tostevin; Laura le Cras; Orla Rabey; Molly Staples	4 × 100 m medley relay	—N/a				4:23.37	6

Mixed

Athlete	Event	Heat		Final	
Athlete	Event	Time	Rank	Time	Rank
Tatiana Tostevin; Jonathan Beck; Orla Rabey; Ronny Hallett	4 × 100 m freestyle relay	3:48.97	11	did not advance	
Tatiana Tostevin; Ronny Hallett; Charlie-Joe Hallett; Orla Rabey	4 × 100 m medley relay	4:04.02	8 Q	4:02.79	8

== Triathlon ==
One triathlete was officially selected on 11 November 2021.

Individual

Athlete	Event	Swim (750 m)	Trans 1	Bike (20 km)	Trans 2	Run (5 km)	Total	Rank
Joshua Lewis	Men's	8:47	0:57	27:44	0:22	17:23	55:13	23
