= Pricilla =

Pricilla is a feminine given name. Notable people with the name include:

== Given name ==
- Agatha Pricilla, Indonesian singer and actress
- Joanne Pricilla Loutoy, Seychellois sprinter
- Pricilla de Oliveira Azevedo, Brazilian police officer
- Pricilla Nanyang, South Sudanese politician
- Pricilla Westlake (born 1995), Canadian international lawn bowler

== See also ==
- Priscilla, feminine given name
