= Tirkey =

Tirkey is a surname. Notable people with the surname include:

- Bandhu Tirkey, Indian politician and a former Member of Jharkhand Legislative Assembly
- Bhushan Tirkey, Indian politician and member of Jharkhand Mukti Morcha
- Clement Tirkey, bishop of the Roman Catholic Diocese of Jalpaiguri, India
- Dasrath Tirkey, politician, member of the All India Trinamool Congress
- Dilip Tirkey (born 1977), former Indian field hockey player
- Dipsan Tirkey (born 1998), Indian field hockey player
- Ignace Tirkey, Indian field Hockey player
- Manohar Tirkey (born 1953), member of the 15th Lok Sabha
- Parvati Tirkey (born 1994), Indian poet, educator, researcher
- Pius Tirkey (1928–2014), Indian politician
- Prabhudas Sunil Tirkey, Indian Lutheran bishop
- Prabodh Tirkey (born 1984), Indian hockey midfielder
- Rohit Joseph Tirkey (born 1989), Indian politician
- Roselina Tirkey (born 1982), Indian politician
- Rupa Rani Tirkey (born 1987), international Indian lawn bowler
- Sarita Tirkey, Indian international lawn bowler
- Shilpi Neha Tirkey (born 1993), Indian politician from Jharkhand
- Sunil Chandra Tirkey, Indian Minister of State for Consumer Affairs in West Bengal
