= Elizabeth Moceiwai =

Fijian international female lawn bowler (born 1976)

Personal information
- Born: 13 June 1976 (age 50) Suva, Fiji

Sport
- Sport: Lawn bowls
Medal record
Representing Fiji
Asia Pacific Bowls Championships
Bronze medal – third place	2015 Christchurch	triples

Elizabeth Moceiwai (born 13 June 1976) is a Fijian international female lawn bowler.

== Biography ==
Moceiwai competed at the 2014 Commonwealth Games.

She won a triples bronze medal with Litia Tikoisuva and Sheral Mar at the 2015 Asia Pacific Bowls Championships in New Zealand.

In 2016, she was selected to compete in the 2016 World Outdoor Bowls Championship and four years later in 2020, she was selected for the 2020 World Outdoor Bowls Championship in Australia but the event was cancelled due to the COVID-19 pandemic.

In 2023, she was selected as part of the team to represent Fiji at the 2023 World Outdoor Bowls Championship. She participated in the women's pairs and the women's fours events.
