= Tzvika Hadar =

Tzvika Hadar may refer to:

- Zvika Hadar, Israeli actor, comedian and television host
- Tzvika Hadar (bowls)
