= Jordan Kos =

Canadian lawn bowler

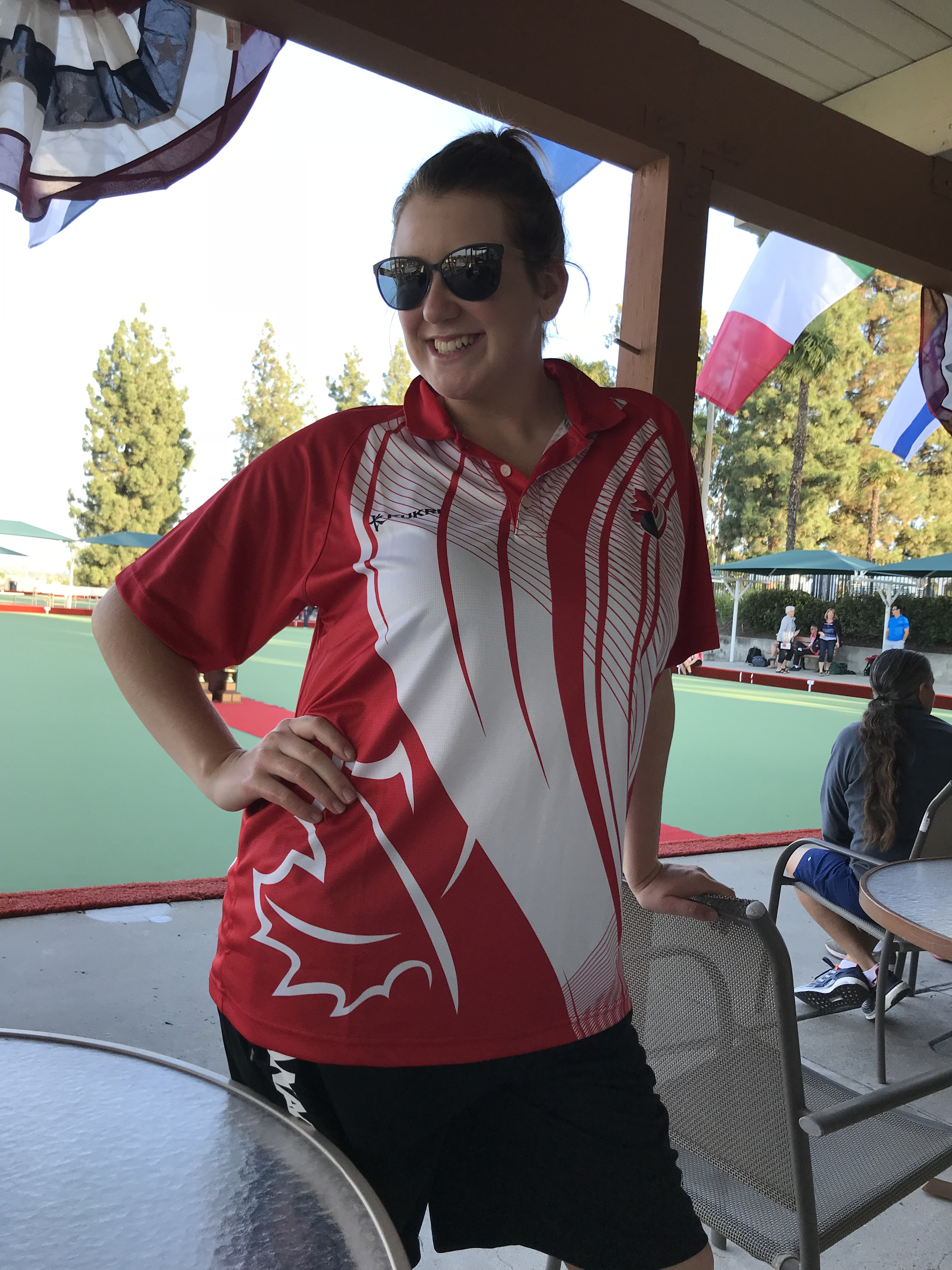

Personal information
- Born: June 25, 2000 (age 26) Regina, Saskatchewan, Canada
- Education: University of Regina
- Occupation: Teacher / Student / Marketing Assistant
- Years active: 2007 - present
- Employer: Ripplinger Financial Corp
- Website: https://jordankos.weebly.com

Sport
- Country: Canada
- Sport: Bowls
- Club: Regina LBC

Achievements and titles
- National finals: 2022 Gold Medal - Canadian Women's Singles
Medal record
Representing Canada
Asia Pacific Bowls Championships
Bronze medal – third place	2019 Gold Coast	triples

Jordan Audra Sargent Kos (born June 25, 2000) is a female international Canadian lawn bowler.

== Personal ==
Kos started lawn bowling at the Regina Lawn Bowling Club in May 2008 at the age of 7 years. Kos became a member of the Development Squad of Team Canada in 2014, at the age of 14 years - the youngest player every to do so. Kos became a member of the high performance, seniors quad, Team Canada in 2016. Kos attends the University of Regina, Faculty of Education and Faculty of Arts History.

== Bowls career ==
Kos won a bronze medal in the triples with Jacqueline Foster and Leanne Chinery at the 2019 Asia Pacific Bowls Championships, held in the Gold Coast, Queensland.

In 2020, Kos was selected for the blue ribbon event of the sport, the 2020 World Outdoor Bowls Championship in Australia but the event was cancelled due to the COVID-19 pandemic.

Kos was selected to represent Canada at the 2022 Commonwealth Games held in Birmingham, England. She competed in the women's singles and the women's pairs (as skip). This was Kos' debut appearance at the Commonwealth Games. In 2023, Kos represented Canada at the World Bowls Champion of Champions. Kos placed 2nd in her pool and 4th overall. Kos advanced to the semi-finals and was eliminated by USA. Also in 2023, she was selected again, as part of the team to represent Canada at the 2023 World Outdoor Bowls Championship. She participated in the women's pairs and the women's fours events. In the fours, Kos qualified in second place in her group before being eliminated in the quarter final, after losing to Scotland.

In 2024, Kos was selected to represent Canada at the Atlantic Challenge (formerly the Four Nations Series) in Ayr, Scotland at the Bowls Scotland's National Training Centre.
