= Sheral Mar =

Fijian lawn bowler

Personal information
- Born: 17 March 1964 (age 62) Suva, Colony of Fiji, British Empire

Sport
- Sport: Lawn bowls
Medal record
Representing Fiji
Asia Pacific Bowls Championships
Bronze medal – third place	2015 Christchurch	triples

Sheral Mar (born 1964) is a Fijian international female lawn bowler.

== Biography ==
Mar won a triples bronze medal with Litia Tikoisuva and Elizabeth Moceiwai at the 2015 Asia Pacific Bowls Championships in New Zealand.

In 2016 she was selected to compete in the 2016 World Outdoor Bowls Championship and four years later in 2020 she was selected for the 2020 World Outdoor Bowls Championship in Australia. In between she competed at the 2018 Commonwealth Games.

In 2022, she competed in the women's triples and the Women's fours at the 2022 Commonwealth Games.
