= 2020 World Outdoor Bowls Championship =

Canceled bowls tournament in Australia

World Outdoor Championships 2020
- 14th World Outdoor Bowls Championships
- Location: Gold Coast, Australia
- Date: Cancelled
- Category: World Bowls Championship

The 2020 World Outdoor Bowls Championship was to be the 14th edition of the World Championships to be held at the Broadbeach Bowls Club, Musgrave Hill Bowls Club and Club Helensvale on the Gold Coast in Queensland, Australia. There were to be eight events that determined the 2021 world champions, the men's singles, doubles, triples and fours and the women's singles, doubles, triples and fours and in addition there are two overall team winners who receive the Leonard and Taylor trophies respectively. It was originally scheduled from 23 May to 7 June 2020 but the event was officially cancelled on 9 March 2021.

== Postponement ==
The event followed suit of other sporting events around the world in early 2020, with the outbreak of the COVID-19 (coronavirus) outbreak wreaking havoc across the sporting industry. On March 17, 2020, World Bowls and host organisation Bowls Australia made the decision to postpone the event. Australia's borders were closed to foreign travellers and no time was set as to when the event would be postponed until, due to the uncertain nature of the coronavirus. “We believe this is the right decision to minimise the risk of public exposure to the coronavirus, which the World Health Organization recently declared a global pandemic," World Bowls Chief Executive Officer Gary Smith said at the time. On 31 March, it was announced that the event would be held on 25 May to 6 June 2021 but then suffered a further delay with new dates of 7 September to 19 September 2021 being announced.

== Cancellation ==
Following continual issues surrounding the pandemic, the Championships were officially cancelled on 9 March 2021. Furthermore it was decided that the World Championships would take place every two years starting in 2023. This also resulted in the fact that qualifying events for the Championships were no longer required meaning the Atlantic Bowls Championships and Asia Pacific Bowls Championships were terminated.

== Participating teams ==
There were due to be 36 nations/associations competing at 2021 Championships.

Participating teams
- Australia (hosts)
- Argentina
- Botswana
- Brunei
- Canada
- China
- Cyprus
- England
- Fiji
- France
- Guernsey
- Hong Kong, China
- India
- Isle of Man
- Ireland
- Israel
- Japan
- Jersey
- Malaysia
- Malta
- Namibia
- Netherlands
- New Zealand
- Niue
- Norfolk Island
- Papua New Guinea
- Philippines
- Samoa
- Scotland
- Spain
- Singapore
- South Africa
- Thailand
- Tonga
- United States
- Wales
- Zimbabwe

== Teams ==
=== Men's singles ===
- (Australia) Aaron Wilson
- (Botswana) Remmy Kebapetse
- (Canada) Ryan Bester
- (England) Robert Paxton
- (Hong Kong) Tony Cheung
- (India) Mridul Borgohain
- Gary Kelly
- (Israel) Tzvika Hadar
- (Jersey) Ross Davis
- (Malaysia) Fairul Izwan Abd Muin
- (Malta) Brendan Aquilina
- (Namibia) Carbous Oliver
- (New Zealand) Shannon McIlroy
- (Niue) Frederrick Tafatu
- (Papua New Guinea) Joe Morgan
- (Philippines) Christopher Dagpin
- (Samoa) Solomona Faamaoni
- (Scotland) Darren Burnett
- (South Africa) Jason Evans
- (Spain) Thomas Rodgers
- (Thailand) Uthen Ontong
- (United States) Charlie Herbert
- (Wales) Daniel Salmon
- (Zimbabwe) Aaron Chilundo

=== Men's pairs ===
- (Australia) Corey Wedlock & Aaron Wilson
- (Botswana) John Gaborutwe & Remmy Kebapetse
- (Canada) John Bezear & Ryan Bester
- (China) Mao Yongmin & Liu Guoqiang
- (England) Nick Brett & Robert Paxton
- (Guernsey) Matt Solway & Matt Le Ber
- (Hong Kong) Lyndon Sham & Tony Cheung
- (India) Ananda Kumar Narzary & Mridul Borgohain
- Mark Wilson & Marty McHugh
- (Isle of Man) Clive McGreal & Mark McGreal
- (Jersey) Derek Boswell & Ross Davis
- (Malaysia) Zulhilmie Redzuan & Fairul Izwan Abd Muin
- (Malta) Mark Malogorski & Brendan Aquilina
- (Namibia) JP Fouche & Carbous Oliver
- (New Zealand) Shannon McIlroy & Gary Lawson
- (Norfolk Island) Hadyn Evans & Ryan Dixon
- (Papua New Guinea) Joe Morgan & Matu Bazo
- (Philippines) Rodel Labayo & Leo Carreon
- (Scotland) Paul Foster & Alex Marshall
- (South Africa) Wayne Rittmuller & Jason Evans
- (Thailand) Woramet Singkeaw & Uthen Ontong
- (United States) Bob Schneider & Charlie Herbert
- (Wales) Daniel Salmon & Jonathan Tomlinson
- (Zimbabwe) Myles Hopper & Thomas Craven

=== Men's triples ===
- (Argentina) Ricardo Rubinat, Jorge Barreto, Raul Pollet
- (Australia) Barrie Lester, Aaron Teys, Aron Sherriff
- (Canada) Rob Law, Greg Wilson, Cam Lefresne
- (China) Meng Zhaoqian, Zhang Baocheng, Ye Suiying
- (Cyprus) Robert Manson, Colin Hall, Scott Ferguson
- (England) Andrew Knapper, Jamie Walker, Sam Tolchard
- (Fiji) Kushal Pillay, Rajnesh Prasad, Semesa Naiseruvati
- (France) Maxime Faury, Virgile Machado, Amaury Dumont
- (Hong Kong) Imen Tang, James Po, Kaho Lee
- (India) Sunil Bahadur, Naveet Rathi Singh, Dinesh Kumar Singh
- Aaron Tennant, Ian McClure, Gary Kelly
- (Israel) Tzvika Hadar, Danny Slodowik, Allan Saitowitz
- (Japan) Hirokazu Mori, Hisaharu Satoh, Kenta Hasebe
- (Jersey) Greg Davis, Scott Baxter, Malcolm De Sousa
- (Malaysia) Izzat Dzulkeple, Fairus Jabal, Syamil Syazwan Ramli
- (Malta) Peter Ellul, Troy Lorimer, Shaun Parnis
- (Namibia) Schalk Van Wyk, Steven Peake, Johan Jacobs
- (New Zealand) Andrew Kelly, Mike Kernaghan, Ali Forsyth
- (Papua New Guinea) Kenneth Ikirima, Gabriel Simeon, Fred Koesan
- (Philippines) Hommer Mercado, Christopher Dagpin, Ronald Lising
- (Scotland) Ronnie Duncan, Derek Oliver, Darren Burnett
- (South Africa) Prince Neluonde, Charles Mathewson, Pierre Breitenbach
- (United States) Loren Dion, James Flower, Neil Furman
- (Wales) Ross Owen, Chris Klefenz, Steve Harris

=== Men's fours ===
- (Argentina) Ricardo Rubinat, Rodolfo Muller, Jorge Barreto, Raul Pollet
- (Australia) Barrie Lester, Aaron Teys, Corey Wedlock, Aron Sherriff
- (Botswana) Ajitkumar Naik, Baven Balendra, John Gaborutwe, Binesh Desai
- (Canada) Rob Law, Greg Wilson, John Bezear, Cam Lefresne
- (England) Andrew Knapper, Nick Brett, Jamie Walker, Sam Tolchard
- (Hong Kong) Imen Tang, Lyndon Sham, James Po, Kaho Lee
- (India) Ananda Kumar Narzary, Naveet Rathi, Sunil Bahadur, Dinesh Kumar
- Aaron Tennant, Mark Wilson, Ian McClure, Marty McHugh
- (Israel) Daniel Alonim, Selwyn Hare, Danny Slodowik, Allan Saitowitz
- (Japan) Tomoyuki Tamachi, Hisaharu Satoh, Jun Koyama, Kenta Hasebe
- (Jersey) Derek Boswell, Scott Baxter, Greg Davis, Malcolm De Sousa
- (Malaysia) Izzat Dzulkeple, Fairus Jabal, Zulhilmie Redzuan, Syamil Syazwan Ramli
- (Malta) Peter Ellul, Troy Lorimer, Mark Malogorski, Shaun Parnis
- (Namibia) JP Fouche, Schalk Van Wyk, Steven Peake, Johan Jacobs
- (New Zealand) Andrew Kelly, Mike Kernaghan, Gary Lawson, Ali Forsyth
- (Norfolk Island) Michael Godfrey, Gary Bigg, Hadyn Evans, Ryan Dixon
- (Papua New Guinea) Kenneth Ikirima, Gabriel Simeon, Matu Bazo, Fred Koesan
- (Philippines) Hommer Mercado, Rodel Labayo, Leo Carreon, Ronald Lising
- (Scotland) Ronnie Duncan, Derek Oliver, Paul Foster & Alex Marshall
- (South Africa) Prince Neluonde, Wayne Rittmuller, Charles Mathewson, Pierre Breitenbach
- (Thailand) Woramet Singkeaw, Sonthi Manakitpaiboon, Wattana Kadkhunthod, Thanakrit Thammasarn
- (United States) Loren Dion, Bob Schneider, James Flower, Neil Furman
- (Wales) Ross Owen, Chris Klefenz, Steve Harris Jonathan Tomlinson
- (Zimbabwe) Loionel Coventry, Myles Hopper, Clive Robertson, Thomas Craven

=== Women's singles ===
- (Australia) Kelsey Cottrell
- (Botswana) Lephai Modutlwa
- (Canada) Kelly McKerihen
- (China) Miao Xinhong
- (England) Katherine Rednall
- (Fiji) Litia Tikoisuva
- (France) Cindy Royet
- (Guernsey) Lucy Beere
- (Hong Kong) Helen Cheung
- (India) Tania Choudhury
- Catherine Beattie
- (Israel) Ruthie Gilor
- (Japan) Keiko Kurohara
- (Malaysia) Siti Zalina Ahmad
- (Namibia) Bianca Lewis
- (Netherlands) Saskia Schaft
- (New Zealand) Jo Edwards
- (Norfolk Island) Carmen Anderson
- (Scotland) Dee Hoggan
- (Singapore) Tammy Tham Mee Kim
- (South Africa) Colleen Piketh
- (Thailand) Kannika Limwanich
- (Wales) Laura Daniels
- (Zimbabwe) Caryn Sinclair

=== Women's pairs ===
- (Australia) Lynsey Clarke & Kelsey Cottrell
- (Canada) Joanna Cooper & Jordan Kos
- (England) Katherine Rednall & Ellen Falkner
- (Fiji) Losalini Tukai & Litia Tikoisuva
- (Guernsey) Rose Ogier & Lucy Beere
- (Hong Kong) Cheryl Chan & Angel So
- (India) Nayanmoni Saikia & Bangita Hazarika
- Ashleigh Rainey & Sarah Kelly
- (Israel) Ruthie Gilor & Tami Kamzel
- (Jersey) Rachel Macdonald & Fiona Archibald
- (Malaysia) Alyani Jamil & Emma Firyana Saroji
- (Malta) Rebecca Rixon & Connie-Leigh Rixon
- (Namibia) Amanda Steenkamp & Anjuleen Viljoen
- (Netherlands) Ineke Nagtegaal & Norma Duin
- (New Zealand) Tayla Bruce & Jo Edwards
- (Norfolk Island) Shae Wilson & Christine Jones
- (Papua New Guinea) Piwen Karkar & Catherine Wimp
- (Philippines) Hazel Jagonoy & Rosita Bradborn
- (Scotland) Kay Moran & Stacey McDougall
- (Singapore) Tammy Tham Mee Kim & Shermeen Lim
- (South Africa) Nici Neal & Colleen Piketh
- (Thailand) Kannika Limwanich & Patsorn Bryant
- (Wales) Sara Nicholls & Caroline Taylor
- (Zimbabwe) Caryn Sinclair & Melanie James

=== Women's triples ===
- (Argentina) Sara Ines Jaimez, Ana Ramos, Gabriela Villamarin
- (Australia) Ellen Ryan, Natasha Scott, Rebecca Van Asch
- (Brunei) Hajah Nafsiah Jamal, Dayang Isah Muntol, Hajah Ajijah Muntol
- (Canada) Jackie Foster, Leanne Chinery, Kelly McKerihen
- (China) Miao Xinhong, Zheng Fang, Song Suzhen
- (England) Sophie Tolchard, Lorraine Kuhler, Sian Honnor
- (Fiji) Elizabeth Moceiwai, Loretta Kotoisuva, Sheral Mar
- (Guernsey) Jackie Nicolle, Gemma Lewin, Lyn Small
- (Hong Kong) Shirley Ko, Phyllis Wong, Helen Cheung
- (India) Sarita Tirkey, Tania Choudhury, Rupa Rani Tirkey
- Megan Devlin, Catherine Beattie, Shauna O'Neill
- (Malaysia) Syafiqa Haidar Afif Abdul Rahman, Azlina Arshad, Siti Zalina Ahmad
- (Malta) Irene Attard, Rosemaree Rixon, Tahlia Camilleri
- (Namibia) Elzaan De Vries, Bianca Lewis, Diana Viljoen
- (Netherlands) Betty Schiltman, Elly Dollieslager, Saskia Schaft
- (New Zealand) Debbie White, Val Smith, Katelyn Inch
- (Norfolk Island) Tracey Wora, Maycee Deszecsar, Carmen Anderson
- (Philippines) Marisa Baronda, Ronalyn Greenlees, Ainie Knight
- (Scotland) Dee Hoggan, Claire Anderson, Lauren Baillie-Whyte
- (South Africa) Bridgett Calitz, Esme Kruger, Johanna Snyman
- (Thailand) Chamaiporn Kotchawong, Palita Gangur, Nannapat Tomak
- (United States) Candy DeFazio, Janice Bell, Anne Nunes
- (Wales) Laura Daniels, Ysie White, Anwen Butten
- (Zimbabwe) Allyson Dale, Heather Singleton, Kerry Craven

=== Women's fours ===
- (Argentina) Sara Ines Jaimez, Celia Nunez, Ana Ramos, Gabriela Villamarin
- (Australia) Ellen Ryan, Lynsey Clarke, Natasha Scott, Rebecca Van Asch
- (Canada) Jackie Foster, Joanna Cooper, Jordan Kos, Leanne Chinery
- (England) Sophie Tolchard, Lorraine Kuhler, Ellen Falkner, Sian Honnor
- (Fiji) Losalini Tukai, Elizabeth Moceiwai, Loretta Kotoisuva, Sheral Mar
- (Guernsey) Rose Ogier, Jackie Nicolle, Gemma Lewin, Lyn Small
- (Hong Kong) Cheryl Chan, Shirley Ko, Phyllis Wong, Angel So
- (India) Sarita Tirkey, Bangita Hazarika, Nayanmoni Saikia, Rupa Rani Tirkey
- Megan Devlin, Ashleigh Rainey, Sarah Kelly, Shauna O'Neill
- (Israel) Amalya Levy, Irit Grenchel, Edna Zomberg, Tami Kamzel
- (Japan) Yoko Goda, Yukie Koyama, Midori Matsuoka, Hiroko Emura
- (Jersey) Jean Holmes, Ethel Southern, Lorraine Bowman, Fiona Archibald
- (Malaysia) Alyani Jamil, Syafiqa Haidar Afif Abdul Rahman, Azlina Arshad, Emma Firyana Saroji
- (Malta) Tahlia Camilleri, Rosemaree Rixon, Rebecca Rixon, Connie-Leigh Rixon
- (Namibia) Elzaan De Vries, Amanda Steenkamp, Anjuleen Viljoen, Diana Viljoen
- (New Zealand) Tayla Bruce, Debbie White, Val Smith, Katelyn Inch
- (Norfolk Island) Tracey Wora, Maycee Deszecsar, Shae Wilson, Christine Jones
- (Philippines) Hazel Jagonoy Ronalyn Greenlees, Ainie Knight, Rosita Bradborn
- (Scotland) Kay Moran, Claire Anderson, Stacey McDougall, Lauren Baillie-Whyte
- (Singapore) Josephine Lim Poh Tin, May Lee Beng Hua, Amira Goh Quee Kee, Shermeen Lim Xin Yi
- (South Africa) Bridgett Calitz, Nici Neal, Esme Kruger, Johanna Snyman
- (Thailand) Chamaiporn Kotchawong, Nannapat Tomak, Palita Gangur, Patsorn Bryant
- (Wales) Sara Nicholls, Caroline Taylor, Ysie White, Anwen Butten
- (Zimbabwe) Allyson Dale, Melanie James, Heather Singleton, Kerry Craven
