= Shae Wilson =

Norfolk Island bowls player (born 1999)

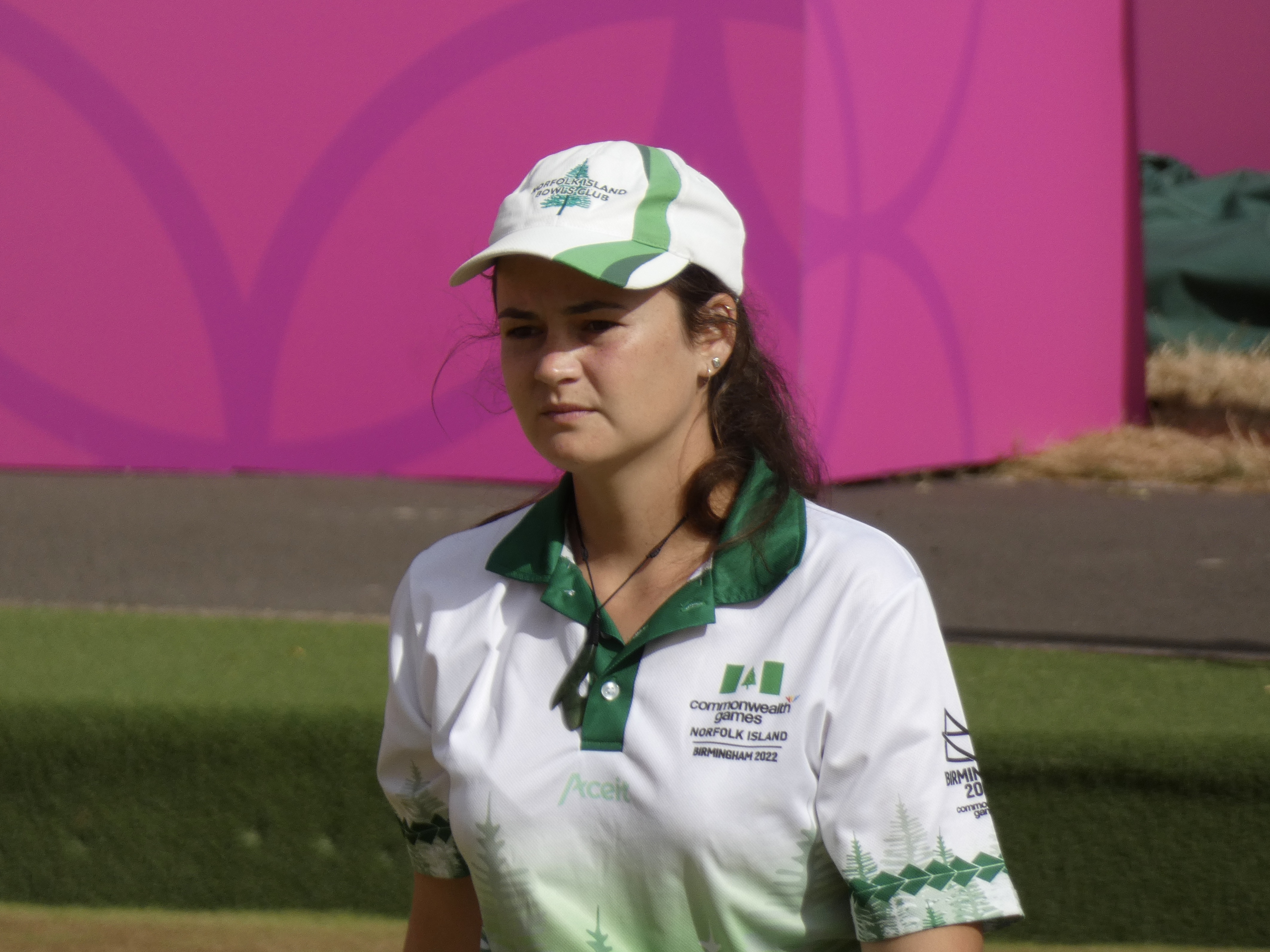
- Wilson at the 2022 Commonwealth Games in Leamington Spa

Personal information
- Nationality: Norfolk Islander
- Born: 11 January 1999 (age 27)

Achievements and titles
- Highest world ranking: 23 (August 2026)
Medal record
Representing (Norfolk Island)
Commonwealth Games
Bronze medal – third place	2026 Glasgow	singles
World Singles Champion of Champions
Gold medal – first place	2025 Barham	singles

Shae Wilson (born 11 January 1999) is an international lawn bowler from Norfolk Island. She has represented Norfolk Island at multiple international events, including at two Commonwealth Games. She reached a highest world ranking of number 23 in August 2026.

== Career ==
In 2018, she competed at the 2018 Commonwealth Games on the Gold Coast, in the women's singles and the women's fours at the Games.

The following year in 2019, Shae achieved Norfolk Island's first medal at World Champion of Champions, winning bronze in women's singles.

She competed in her second Commonwealth Games, at the 2022 Commonwealth Games in Birmingham, in the women's singles and the women's pairs. She finished top of her group in the singles and defeated Laura Daniels (a former world champion) in the quarter-finals before losing in the semi-finals to the eventual champion Ellen Ryan and then losing the bronze medal play off.

In 2023, she was selected again as part of the team to represent the Norfolk Islands at the 2023 World Outdoor Bowls Championship. She participated in the women's singles and the women's pairs events. In the pairs partnering Carmen Anderson, she won her group undefeated but lost to Malta in the quarter finals.

After winning her national singles title, Wilson subsequently won the 2025 World Singles Champion of Champions, defeating Debbie White in the final.

At the 2026 Commonwealth Games, which was played indoors in Glasgow, Wilson won the bronze medal in the women's singles.
