= Rose Ogier =

British bowls player

Personal information
- Full name: Rosemary Ogier
- Nationality: British (Guernsey)
- Born: 5 December 1955 (age 70)

Achievements and titles
- Highest world ranking: 47 (August 2024)
Medal record
Representing (Guernsey)
Atlantic Bowls Championships
Silver medal – second place	2019 Cardiff	pairs
European Championships
Gold medal – first place	2019 Guernsey	pairs
Gold medal – first place	2019 Guernsey	mixed fours
Gold medal – first place	2019 Guernsey	team

Rosemary Ogier (born 5 December 1955) is an international lawn bowler from Guernsey.

== Bowls career ==
Ogier won a pairs silver medal (with Lucy Beere), at the 2019 Atlantic Bowls Championships in Cardiff. Also in 2019, she won three gold medals at the European Bowls Championships.

The following year in 2020, Ogier was selected as part of the five woman team by Guernsey for the 2020 World Outdoor Bowls Championship

In 2022, she competed in the women's pairs at the 2022 Commonwealth Games.
