= Lawn bowls at the 2022 Commonwealth Games – Men's singles =

Bowls event

Lawn bowls men's singles at the 2022 Commonwealth Games
- Venue: Victoria Park
- Dates: 2 August – 6 August 2022
- Competitors: 18 from 18 nations

Medalists
gold medal	Aaron Wilson	Australia
silver medal	Gary Kelly	Northern Ireland
bronze medal	Iain McLean	Scotland

Lawn bowls at the 2022 Commonwealth Games – Men's singles was held at the Victoria Park from August 2 to 6. A total of 18 athletes from 18 associations participated in the event. Australia's Aaron Wilson won the gold medal, defeating Gary Kelly from Northern Ireland in the final. Iain McLean of Scotland won the bronze medal.

== Sectional play ==
The top two from each section advance to the knockout stage.

=== Section A ===
Rank	Athlete	MP	MW	MT	ML	FR	AG	PD	PTS
1	Aaron Wilson (AUS)	4	4	0	0	84	38	+46	12
2	Jason Evans (RSA)	4	3	0	1	72	56	+16	9
3	Cephas Kimwaki Kimani (KEN)	4	1	0	3	61	74	-13	3
4	Philip Jim (COK)	4	1	0	3	56	80	-24	3
5	Todd Priaulx (GGY)	4	1	0	3	55	80	-25	3

	Australia	South Africa	Kenya	Cook Islands	Guernsey
Australia	—	21–9	21–13	21–9	21–7
South Africa	9–21	—	21–10	21–9	21–16
Kenya	13–21	10–21	—	17–21	21–11
Cook Islands	9–21	9–21	21–17	—	17–21
Guernsey	7–21	16–21	11–21	21–17	—

=== Section B ===
Rank	Athlete	MP	MW	MT	ML	FR	AG	PD	PTS
1	Gary Kelly (NIR)	4	4	0	0	84	51	+33	12
2	Ryan Bester (CAN)	4	3	0	1	76	50	+26	9
3	Daniel Salmon (WAL)	4	2	0	2	64	62	+2	6
4	Ryan Dixon (NFK)	4	1	0	3	52	76	-24	3
5	Tukala Matua Leomotu Tagelagi (NIU)	4	0	0	4	47	84	-37	0

	Canada	Northern Ireland	Norfolk Island	Niue	Wales
Canada	—	13–21	21–8	21–11	21–10
Northern Ireland	21–13	—	21–12	21-14	21–12
Norfolk Island	8–21	12–21	—	21–13	11–21
Niue	11–21	14–21	13–21	—	9–21
Wales	10–21	12–21	21–11	21–9	—

=== Section C ===
Rank	Athlete	MP	MW	MT	ML	FR	AG	PD	PTS
1	Fairul Izwan Abd Muin (MAS)	4	3	0	1	75	47	+28	9
2	Jamie Walker (ENG)	4	3	0	1	71	52	+19	9
3	Carel Aron Olivier (NAM)	4	3	0	1	75	57	+18	9
4	Semesa Naiseruvati (FIJ)	4	1	0	3	61	67	-6	3
5	Robert Simpson (JAM)	4	0	0	4	25	84	-59	0

	Malaysia	England	Namibia	Jamaica	Fiji
Malaysia	—	21–8	12–21	21–4	21–14
England	8–21	—	21–12	21–8	21–11
Namibia	21–12	12–21	—	21–9	21–15
Jamaica	4–21	8–21	9–21	—	4–21
Fiji	14–21	11–21	15–21	21–4	—

=== Section D ===
Rank	Athlete	MP	MW	MT	ML	FR	AG	PD	PTS
1	Iain McLean (SCO)	4	3	0	1	82	43	+39	9
2	Ross Davis (JEY)	4	3	0	1	76	60	+16	9
3	Shannon McIlroy (NZL)	4	2	0	2	65	55	+10	6
4	Mridul Borgohain (IND)	4	2	0	2	63	66	-3	6
5	Chris Locke (FLK)	4	0	0	4	22	84	-62	0

	Scotland	New Zealand	India	Falkland Islands	Jersey
Scotland	—	21–4	19–21	21–5	21–13
New Zealand	4–21	—	21–8	21–5	19–21
India	21–19	8–21	–	21–5	13–21
Falkland Islands	5–21	5–21	5–21	–	7–21
Jersey	13–21	21–19	21–13	21–7	—

== Knockout stage ==
Quarterfinals
A1	Aaron Wilson (AUS)	21
C2	Jamie Walker (ENG)	16
D1	Iain McLean (SCO)	21
B2	Ryan Bester (CAN)	4
B1	Gary Kelly (NIR)	21
A2	Jason Evans (RSA)	12
C1	Fairul Izwan Abd Muin (MAS)	21
D2	Ross Davis (JEY)	12

Semifinals
A1	Aaron Wilson (AUS)	21
D1	Iain McLean (SCO)	9
B1	Gary Kelly (NIR)	21
C1	Fairul Izwan Abd Muin (MAS)	15

Final
A1	Aaron Wilson (AUS)	21
B1	Gary Kelly (NIR)	3
Third place
D1	Iain McLean (SCO)	21
C1	Fairul Izwan Abd Muin (MAS)	11
