= Joanna Cooper (bowls) =

Canadian international lawn bowler

Personal information
- Born: 3 December 1983 (age 42) Calgary, Alberta, Canada

Sport
- Sport: Lawn bowls
- Club: Stanley Park LBC; Rotary Park LBC; Calgary LBC; North East Valley BC (Nzl)
Medal record
Representing Canada
World Outdoor Championships
Bronze medal – third place	2023 Gold Coast	triples

Joanna Cooper (born 3 December 1983) is a Canadian international lawn bowler.

== Biography ==
She was born in Calgary, Alberta, Canada and was selected as part of the Canadian team for the 2018 Commonwealth Games on the Gold Coast in Queensland where she reached the semi-finals of the Fours with Pricilla Westlake, Leanne Chinery and Jackie Foster.

In 2020, she was selected for the blue riband of the sport, the 2020 World Outdoor Bowls Championship in Australia but the event was cancelled due to the COVID-19 pandemic.

In 2023, she was selected again as part of the team to represent Canada at the 2023 World Outdoor Bowls Championship. She participated in the women's triples and the women's fours events. In the fours, Cooper qualified in second place in her group before being eliminated in the quarter final after losing to Scotland. One week later in the triples partnering Baylee van Steijn and Emma Boyd, the team won a bronze medal after losing to New Zealand in the semi finals.
