= Sarita Tirkey =

Personal information
- Nationality: India
Medal record
Representing India
Asia Pacific Bowls Championships
Bronze medal – third place	2019 Gold Coast	triples

Sarita Tirkey is an Indian women's international lawn bowler.

== Bowls career ==
=== World Championships ===
In 2020 she was selected for the 2020 World Outdoor Bowls Championship in Australia.

=== Asia Pacific ===
Tirkey won a bronze medal in the triples with Tania Choudhury and Rupa Rani Tirkey, at the 2019 Asia Pacific Bowls Championships, held in the Gold Coast, Queensland.
