= Chloe Wilson =

Irish and Northern Irish lawn bowler

Personal information
- Nationality: British (Northern Irish)
- Born: 8 March 2002 (age 24)

Sport
- Sport: Lawn bowls

Achievements and titles
- Highest world ranking: 20 (August 2026)
Medal record
Representing Ireland
World Outdoor Championships
Bronze medal – third place	2023 Gold Coast	triples
Bowls World Cup
Bronze medal – third place	2025 Kuala Lumpur	pairs
European Bowls Championships
Gold medal – first place	2022 Ayr	triples
Gold medal – first place	2024 Ayr	fours
World Indoor Bowls Championships
Gold medal – first place	2026 Yarmouth	mixed pairs
Irish Nationals
Gold medal – first place	2024	fours
Representing Northern Ireland
Commonwealth Games
Bronze medal – third place	2026 Glasgow	pairs

Chloe Wilson (born 8 March 2002) is a lawn and indoor bowler who has represented both Ireland and Northern Ireland. She reached a career high ranking of world number 20 in August 2026.

== Career ==
Wilson won the Northern Ireland Women's Bowling Association (NIWBA) Pairs Championship in 2018 and on eyear later was chosen for the Irish Emerging Squad. Wilson was selected to represent Northern Ireland in the triples and the fours at the 2022 Commonwealth Games. During 2002, she also won a gold medal at the European Bowls Championships in the triples with Ashleigh Rainey and Lara Reaney.

In 2023, she was selected as part of the All-Ireland team for the sport's blue riband event, the 2023 World Outdoor Bowls Championship on the Gold Coast In Australia. She participated in the women's triples and the women's fours events. In the triples partnering Sophie McIntyre and Shauna O'Neill, the team won a bronze medal after losing to Australia in the semi finals.

In 2024 she won another gold medal at the 2024 European Bowls Championships but this time in the fours. Wilson won a her first national title at the 2024 Irish National Bowls Championships in the fours.

On her debut at the 2026 World Indoor Bowls Championship she teamed up with England's Jamie Walker to win the mixed pairs title.

Playing with Shauna O'Neill, she won the bronze medal in the women's pairs at the 2026 Commonwealth Games in Glasgow.
