= Baylee van Steijn =

Canadian lawn bowler

Personal information
- Born: 26 February 2001 (age 25) Gores Landing, Ontario, Canada

Sport
- Sport: Lawn bowls
- Club: Cobourg LBC / Port Perry LBC
Medal record
Representing Canada
World Outdoor Championships
Bronze medal – third place	2023 Gold Coast	triples

Baylee van Steijn (born 26 February 2001) is a Canadian international lawn bowler.

== Career ==
Baylee van Steijn first came to prominence in 2016, when she represented Canada against the United States, as part of the Canadian Development squad. Two years later in 2018, she won a bronze medal in a ten nation event in Wales. Bowling with Jake Masterson, she won the mixed pairs national title of Canada in 2022 and the following year in 2023, won the silver medal at the Canadian Youth Championships.

In 2023, she was selected as part of the team to represent Canada at the blue riband event of the sport, the 2023 World Outdoor Bowls Championship. She participated in the women's triples and the women's fours events. In the fours, van Steijn qualified in second place in her group before being eliminated in the quarter final after losing to Scotland. One week later in the triples partnering Joanna Cooper and Emma Boyd, the team won a bronze medal after losing to New Zealand in the semi finals.
