= Daniel Alonim =

Israeli international lawn bowler

Personal information
- Native name: דניאל אלונים
- Nationality: Israeli
Medal record
Representing (Israel)
Atlantic Bowls Championships
| Bronze medal – third place | 2015 Cyprus | pairs |

Daniel Alonim (Hebrew: דניאל אלונים) is an Israeli international lawn bowler.

== Bowls career ==
Alonim was selected as part of the five man team by Israel for the 2020 World Outdoor Bowls Championship He also represented Israel at the 2016 World Outdoor Bowls Championship.

He won a pairs bronze medal (with Tzvika Hadar), at the 2015 Atlantic Bowls Championships.
