= Cycling at the 2022 Commonwealth Games – Men's road time trial =

Cycling – Men's road time trial at the 2022 Commonwealth Games
- Venue: West Park
- Dates: 4 August
- Competitors: 54 from 29 nations
- Winning time: 46:21.24

Medalists
gold medal	Rohan Dennis	Australia
silver medal	Fred Wright	England
bronze medal	Geraint Thomas	Wales

The men's road time trial at the 2022 Commonwealth Games in Birmingham, England was held on 4 August along the West Park.

== Schedule ==
The schedule was as follows:

Date	Time	Round
Thursday 4 August 2022	12:01	Race

All times are British Summer Time (UTC+1)

== Results ==
The results were as follows:

Rank	Name	Time	Behind
1st place, gold medalist(s)	Rohan Dennis (AUS)	46:21.24	–
2nd place, silver medalist(s)	Fred Wright (ENG)	46:47.52	+26.28
3rd place, bronze medalist(s)	Geraint Thomas (WAL)	46:49.73	+28.49
4	Aaron Gate (NZL)	48:43.28	+2:22.04
5	Luke Plapp (AUS)	48:47.70	+2:26.46
6	John Archibald (SCO)	48:54.55	+2:33.31
7	Owain Doull (WAL)	49:05.46	+2:44.22
8	Darren Rafferty (NIR)	49:10.80	+2:49.56
9	Tom Sexton (NZL)	49:41.52	+3:20.28
10	Andreas Miltiadis (CYP)	49:50.49	+3:29.25
11	Kaden Hopkins (BER)	50:00.27	+3:39.03
12	Daniel Bigham (ENG)	50:04.66	+3:43.42
13	Pier-André Côté (CAN)	50:29.62	+4:08.38
14	Mark Stewart (SCO)	50:38.79	+4:17.55
15	Conor White (BER)	50:52.19	+4:30.95
16	Tyler Hannay (IOM)	51:02.83	+4:41.59
17	Moise Mugisha (RWA)	51:56.70	+5:35.46
18	Gustav Basson (RSA)	52:04.58	+5:43.34
19	Charles Kagimu (UGA)	52:05.91	+5:44.67
20	Leon Mazzone (IOM)	52:28.38	+6:07.14
21	Sam Culverwell (GGY)	52:36.52	+6:15.28
22	Finn Crockett (SCO)	52:42.37	+6:21.13
23	Sebastian Tremlett (GGY)	52:58.23	+6:36.99
24	Michael Foley (CAN)	53:05.24	+6:44.00
25	Jack Rebours (JEY)	53:21.99	+7:00.75
26	Nicholas Narraway (BER)	53:34.82	+7:13.58
27	Byiza Uhiriwe (RWA)	53:52.62	+7:31.38
28	Mark Lett (GIB)	53:56.84	+7:35.60
29	Dean Robson (JEY)	54:39.14	+8:17.90
30	Samuel O'Shea (GIB)	54:59.17	+8:37.93
31	Marc Cox (GGY)	55:02.35	+8:41.11
32	Dirk Coetzee (NAM)	55:05.94	+8:44.70
33	Christopher Rougier-Lagane (MRI)	55:09.46	+8:48.22
34	Alexandre Mayer (MRI)	55:10.80	+8:49.56
35	Hasani Hennis (AIA)	55:18.18	+8:56.94
36	Aidan Buttigieg (MLT)	56:05.93	+9:44.69
37	Sam Talbot (IVB)	56:06.67	+9:45.43
38	Oscar Quiroz (BIZ)	56:56.05	+10:34.81
39	Cory Williams (BIZ)	57:16.32	+10:55.08
40	Michael Testori (CAY)	57:41.29	+11:20.05
41	Darel Christopher (IVB)	58:06.36	+11:45.12
42	Matlhogonolo Botlhole (BOT)	59:43.20	+13:21.96
43	Victor Magalhães (CAY)	1:00:38.99	+14:17.75
44	Lorin Sawyer (BAH)	1:02:19.72	+15:58.48
45	Delroy Carty (AIA)	1:02:29.71	+16:08.47
46	Jim Horton (FLK)	1:02:45.73	+16:24.49
47	Christopher Symonds (GHA)	1:02:56.79	+16:35.55
48	Giovanni Lovell (BIZ)	1:03:07.68	+16:46.44
49	Yohan Monthy (SEY)	1:03:41.19	+17:19.95
50	Henry Djangmah (GHA)	1:04:26.26	+18:05.02
51	Christopher Griffith (GUY)	1:04:38.91	+18:17.67
52	Mario Ernesta (SEY)	1:04:43.81	+18:22.57
53	Derek Barbara (GIB)	1:05:05.87	+18:44.63
54	Felix Neely (BAH)	1:07:58.03	+21:36.79
	Reinardt Janse van Rensburg (RSA)	Did not start	
	Daryl Impey (RSA)	Did not start	
	Conor Delanbanque (ANT)	Did not start	
