= Mark Malogorski =

Maltese lawn bowler

Personal information
- Nationality: Maltese
- Born: 31 January 1970 (age 56)
Medal record
Representing (Malta)
Atlantic Bowls Championships
Bronze medal – third place	2019 Cardiff	pairs

Mark Anthony Malogorski (born 31 January 1970) is a Maltese international lawn bowler.

== Bowls career ==
Malogorski was selected as part of the five man team by Malta for the 2020 World Outdoor Bowls Championship

He won a pairs bronze medal (with Brendan Aquilina), at the 2019 Atlantic Bowls Championships.

In 2022, Malogorski was selected for the 2022 Commonwealth Games in Birmingham. He competed in the men's fours at the 2022 Games.
