= Kerry Craven =

Zimbabwean international lawn bowler

Personal information
- Nationality: Zimbabwean
Medal record
Representing (Zimbabwe)
Atlantic Bowls Championships
| Bronze medal – third place | 2019 Cardiff | fours |

Kerry Craven is a Zimbabwean international lawn bowler.

== Bowls career ==
Craven was selected as part of the five woman team by Zimbabwe for the 2020 World Outdoor Bowls Championship

She won a fours bronze medal (with Allyson Dale, Melanie James and Heather Singleton), at the 2019 Atlantic Bowls Championships.
