= Kristina Van Nierop =

Australian lawn bowler

Kristina Van Nierop née Krstic
Personal information
- Nationality: Australian
- Born: 15 June 1994 (age 32)
- Occupation(s): Lawn bowler, chiropractor

Sport
- Sport: Lawn bowls
- Club: Manning Memorial BC

Achievements and titles
- Highest world ranking: 3 (June 2025)
Medal record
Women's bowls
Representing Australia
World Outdoor Championships
Silver medal – second place	2023 Gold Coast	fours
Bronze medal – third place	2023 Gold Coast	team
Commonwealth Games
Gold medal – first place	2022 Birmingham	pairs
Nationals
Gold medal – first place	2024	fours

Kristina Van Nierop née Krstic (born 15 June 1994) is an Australian international lawn bowler. She represented Australia at the 2022 Commonwealth Games, where she won a gold medal in the pairs. She reached a career high ranking of world number 3 in June 2025.

== Personal life ==
Krstic attended Mount Lawley Senior High School from 2007 to 2011.

== Bowls career ==
Krstic, a chiropractor, started bowling at age 10 and won multiple titles at the junior level. She came to prominence after winning the silver medal in the pairs with Karen Murphy at the 2015 Hong Kong International Bowls Classic. She has won four Australian National Bowls Championships medals and four Australian open medals.

In 2022, Krstic competed in the women's pairs and the women's fours at the 2022 Commonwealth Games in Birmingham. In the pairs even, with Ellen Ryan, she won the gold medal, defeating England in a tie break final that went down to the last shot of the game.

In 2023, she was selected as part of the team to represent Australia at the 2023 World Outdoor Bowls Championship. She participated in the women's pairs and the women's fours events. In the fours, her team won the silver medal after losing to England in the final.

In 2024 Krstic won the Australian Open pairs with Ellen Fife (formerly Ryan), it was Krstic's first Australian Open title. Later in October, she won the fours at the national Championships.
