= Lawn bowls at the 2022 Commonwealth Games – Women's singles =

Bowls event

Lawn bowls women's singles at the 2022 Commonwealth Games
- Venue: Victoria Park
- Dates: 29 July – 1 August 2022
- Competitors: 18 from 18 nations

Medalists
gold medal	Ellen Ryan	Australia
silver medal	Lucy Beere	Guernsey
bronze medal	Siti Zalina Ahmad	Malaysia

Lawn bowls at the 2022 Commonwealth Games – Women's singles was held at the Victoria Park from July 29 to August 1. A total of 18 athletes from 18 associations participated in the event. Ellen Ryan of Australia won the gold medal, defeating Guernsey's Lucy Beere in the final. Siti Zalina Ahmad from Malaysia won the bronze medal.

== Sectional play ==
The top two from each section advance to the knockout stage.

=== Section A ===
Rank	Athlete	MP	MW	MT	ML	FR	AG	PD	PTS
1	Siti Zalina Ahmad (MAS)	4	4	0	0	84	55	+29	12
2	Katelyn Inch (NZL)	4	3	0	1	83	66	+17	9
3	Amy Pharaoh (ENG)	4	2	0	2	71	61	+10	6
4	Shermeen Lim (SGP)	4	1	0	3	58	82	–24	3
5	Olivia Buckingham (NIU)	4	0	0	4	52	84	–32	0

	England	Malaysia	Niue	New Zealand	Singapore
England	—	11–21	21–16	18–21	21–3
Malaysia	21–11	—	21–7	21–20	21–17
Niue	16–21	7–21	—	10–21	19–21
New Zealand	21–18	20–21	21–10	—	21–17
Singapore	3–21	17–21	21–19	17–21	—

=== Section B ===
Rank	Athlete	MP	MW	MT	ML	FR	AG	PD	PTS
1	Dee Hoggan (SCO)	4	4	0	0	84	43	+41	12
2	Laura Daniels (WAL)	4	3	0	1	77	52	+25	9
3	Shauna O'Neill (NIR)	4	1	0	3	66	65	+1	3
4	Tania Choudhury (IND)	4	1	0	3	61	75	–14	3
5	Daphne Arthur-Almond (FLK)	4	1	0	3	30	83	–53	3

	Falkland Islands	India	Northern Ireland	Scotland	Wales
Falkland Islands	—	21–20	2–21	5–21	2–21
India	20–21	—	21–12	10–21	10–21
Northern Ireland	21–2	12–21	—	14–21	19–21
Scotland	21–5	21–10	21–14	—	21–14
Wales	21–2	21–10	21–19	14–21	—

=== Section C ===
Rank	Athlete	MP	MW	MT	ML	FR	AG	PD	PTS
1	Shae Wilson (NFK)	3	3	0	0	63	47	+16	9
2	Nooroa Mataio (COK)	3	1	0	2	48	48	0	3
3	Colleen Piketh (RSA)	3	1	0	2	52	56	–4	3
4	Litia Tikoisuva (FIJ)	3	1	0	2	43	55	–12	3

	Cook Islands	Fiji	Norfolk Island	South Africa
Cook Islands	—	21–6	13–21	14–21
Fiji	6–21	—	16–21	21–13
Norfolk Island	21–13	21–16	—	21–18
South Africa	21–14	13–21	18–21	—

=== Section D ===
Rank	Athlete	MP	MW	MT	ML	FR	AG	PD	PTS
1	Lucy Beere (GGY)	3	3	0	0	63	34	+29	9
2	Ellen Ryan (AUS)	3	2	0	1	53	45	+8	6
3	Eunice Mbugua (KEN)	3	1	0	2	44	58	–14	3
4	Jordan Kos (CAN)	3	0	0	3	40	63	–23	0

	Australia	Canada	Guernsey	Kenya
Australia	—	21–17	11–21	21–7
Canada	17–21	—	7–21	16–21
Guernsey	21–11	21–7	—	21–16
Kenya	7–21	21–16	16–21	—

== Knockout stage ==
Quarterfinals
A1	Siti Zalina Ahmad (MAS)	21
C2	Nooroa Mataio (COK)	14
D1	Lucy Beere (GGY)	21
A2	Katelyn Inch (NZL)	16
B1	Dee Hoggan (SCO)	9
D2	Ellen Ryan (AUS)	21
C1	Shae Wilson (NFK)	21
B2	Laura Daniels (WAL)	11

Semifinals
A1	Siti Zalina Ahmad (MAS)	15
D1	Lucy Beere (GGY)	21
D2	Ellen Ryan (AUS)	21
C1	Shae Wilson (NFK)	17

Final
D1	Lucy Beere (GGY)	17
D2	Ellen Ryan (AUS)	21
Third place
A1	Siti Zalina Ahmad (MAS)	21
C1	Shae Wilson (NFK)	10
