= Boxing at the 2022 Commonwealth Games – Women's light middleweight =

Boxing competitions

Boxing – Women's light middleweight at the 2022 Commonwealth Games
- Venue: National Exhibition Centre Hall 4
- Dates: July 30 – 7 August 2022
- Competitors: 11 from 11 nations

Medalists
| gold medal | Rosie Eccles | Wales |
| silver medal | Kaye Scott | Australia |
| bronze medal | Alcinda Panguana | Mozambique |
| bronze medal | Eireann Nugent | Northern Ireland |

The Women's light middleweight boxing competitions at the 2022 Commonwealth Games in Birmingham, England took place between July 30 and August 7 at National Exhibition Centre Hall 4. Light middleweights were limited to those boxers weighing between 66 and 70 kilograms.

Like all Commonwealth boxing events, the competition was a straight single-elimination tournament. Both semifinal losers were awarded bronze medals, so no boxers competed again after their first loss. Bouts consisted of three rounds of three minutes each, with one-minute breaks between rounds.

== Schedule ==
The schedule is as follows:

| Date | Round |
|---|---|
| Saturday 30 July | Preliminaries |
| Wednesday 3 August | Quarter-finals |
| Saturday 6 August | Semi-finals |
| Sunday 7 August 2022 | Final |

== Results ==
The draw is as follows:

=== Bracket ===
Preliminaries
Clotilde Essiane (CMR) | 5
Kimberly Gittens (BAR) | 0
Jodie Wilkinson (ENG) | 4
Bolanle Shogbamu (NGR) | 1
Ariane Nicholson (NZL) | 0
Lovlina Borgohain (IND) | 5

Quarterfinals
Alcinda Panguana (MOZ) | 3
Clotilde Essiane (CMR) | 2
Kaye Scott (AUS) | 5
Zainab Keita (SLE) | 0
Eireann Nugent (NIR) | 4
Jodie Wilkinson (ENG) | 0
Lovlina Borgohain (IND) | 2
Rosie Eccles (WAL) | 3

Semifinals
Alcinda Panguana (MOZ) | 1
Kaye Scott (AUS) | 4
Eireann Nugent (NIR) | 0
Rosie Eccles (WAL) | 5

Final
Kaye Scott (AUS)
Rosie Eccles (WAL) | RSC
