= Debbie White (bowls) =

New Zealand lawn bowler

Personal information
- Nationality: New Zealander
- Born: 5 January 1963 (age 63)

Sport
- Sport: Lawn bowls
- Club: Hinuera BC (outdoors)

Achievements and titles
- Highest world ranking: 11 (November 2025)
Medal record
World Singles Champion of Champions
Silver medal – second place	2025 Barham	singles
National Championships
Gold medal – first place	2019	singles
Gold medal – first place	2023	fours
Gold medal – first place	2025	singles/fours

Debra Joy White is a New Zealand international lawn bowler. She reached a career high ranking of world number 42 in July 2025.

== Bowls career ==
White became National champion in 2019 when winning the singles at the New Zealand National Bowls Championships.

In 2020 she was selected for the 2020 World Outdoor Bowls Championship in Australia. She won a second national title in the fours during 2023.

In 2025, Whites won the singles and fours titles at the nationals, bowling for Hinuera. She subsequently represented New Zealand at the 2025 World Singles Champion of Champions, reaching the final where she was beaten by Shae Wilson.

== Personal life ==
Her mother Jennie Simpson was an international bowler, Commonwealth Games medallist and National champion.
