= Allyson Dale =

Zimbabwean international lawn bowler

Personal information
- Nationality: Zimbabwean
Medal record
Representing (Zimbabwe)
Atlantic Bowls Championships
Bronze medal – third place	2019 Cardiff	fours

Allyson Dale is a Zimbabwean international lawn bowler.

== Bowls career ==
Dale was selected as part of the five woman team by Zimbabwe for the 2020 World Outdoor Bowls Championship

She won a fours bronze medal (with Melanie James, Heather Singleton and Kerry Craven), at the 2019 Atlantic Bowls Championships.
