= Melanie James =

Zimbabwean lawn bowler

Personal information
- Nationality: Zimbabwean
Medal record
Representing (Zimbabwe)
Atlantic Bowls Championships
Bronze medal – third place	2019 Cardiff	fours

Melanie James is a Zimbabwean international lawn bowler.

== Bowls career ==
James won a fours bronze medal (with Allyson Dale, Heather Singleton and Kerry Craven), at the 2019 Atlantic Bowls Championships.

James was selected as part of the five woman team by Zimbabwe for the sport's blue riband event, the 2020 World Outdoor Bowls Championship but the event was cancelled due to the COVID-19 pandemic.

In 2023, she was selected as part of the team to represent Zimbabwe at the 2023 World Outdoor Bowls Championship. She participated in the women's triples and the women's fours events.
