= Sara Nicholls =

Welsh lawn bowler

Personal information
- Full name: Sara Marie Nicholls
- Nationality: British (Welsh)
- Born: 16 October 1989 (age 36)
- Height: 165 cm (5 ft 5 in)
- Weight: 58 kg (128 lb)

Sport
- Sport: Lawn bowls
- Club: Llandeilo BC (outdoors); City & County of Swansea (indoors)
Medal record
Representing Wales
Atlantic Bowls Championships
Bronze medal – third place	2019 Cardiff	pairs
European Championships
Gold medal – first place	2024 Ayr	triples

Sara Marie Nicholls (born 16 October 1989) is a Welsh international lawn and indoor bowler.

== Bowls career ==
Nicholls was the Welsh team's singles representative at the 2019 Atlantic Bowls Championships where she won the pairs bronze medal at the and in 2020, she was selected for the 2020 World Outdoor Bowls Championship in Australia but the event was cancelled due to the COVID-19 pandemic.

In 2022, she competed in the women's pairs and the Women's fours at the 2022 Commonwealth Games.

In 2023, she was selected as part of the team to represent Wales at the 2023 World Outdoor Bowls Championship. She participated in the women's pairs and the women's fours events. In the fours, her team reached the quarter final before being beaten by England.

Nicholls was in the triples team with Caroline Taylor and Jodie McCarthy that won the gold medal at the 2024 European Bowls Championships.
