= Lawn bowls at the 2022 Commonwealth Games – Women's pairs =

Bowls event

Lawn bowls women's pairs at the 2022 Commonwealth Games
- Venue: Victoria Park
- Dates: 2 – 6 August 2022
- Competitors: 38 from 19 nations

Medalists
gold medal	Kristina Krstic; Ellen Ryan	Australia
silver medal	Amy Pharaoh; Sophie Tolchard	England
bronze medal	Katelyn Inch; Selina Goddard	New Zealand

Lawn bowls at the 2022 Commonwealth Games – women's pairs was held at the Victoria Park from 2 to 6 August 2022. A total of 38 athletes from 19 associations participated in the event. Australia's Kristina Krstic and Ellen Ryan won the gold medal, defeating Amy Pharaoh and Sophie Tolchard of England in the final. Katelyn Inch and Selina Goddard from New Zealand won the bronze medal.

== Sectional play ==
The top two from each section advance to the knockout stage.

=== Section A ===
Rank	Nation	Athletes	MP	MW	MT	ML	FR	AG	PD	PTS
1	Malaysia	Siti Zalina Ahmad, Emma Firyana Saroji	4	3	0	1	81	63	+18	9
2	Norfolk Island	Shae Wilson, Carmen Anderson	4	3	0	1	79	69	+10	9
3	Guernsey	Lucy Beere, Rose Ogier	4	2	1	1	74	59	+15	7
4	Cook Islands	Matapa Puia, Nooroa Mataio	4	1	0	3	52	81	-29	3
5	Malta	Rebecca Rixon, Connie-Leigh Rixon	4	0	1	3	66	80	-14	1

	Malaysia	Norfolk Island	Guernsey	Cook Islands	Malta
Malaysia	—	17–22	22–19	22–6	20–16
Norfolk Island	22–17	—	10–20	26–14	21–18
Guernsey	19–22	20–10	—	18–10	17–17
Cook Islands	6–22	14–26	10–18	—	22–15
Malta	16–20	18–21	17–17	15–22	—

=== Section B ===
Rank	Nation	Athletes	MP	MW	MT	ML	FR	AG	PD	PTS
1	New Zealand	Katelyn Inch, Selina Goddard	3	3	0	0	56	35	+21	9
2	India	Lovely Choubey, Nayanmoni Saikia	3	1	1	1	48	40	+8	4
3	South Africa	Colleen Piketh, Bridget Calitz	3	1	1	1	52	44	+8	4
4	Niue	Olivia Buckingham, Hina Rereiti	3	1	0	2	35	50	-15	3

	New Zealand	India	South Africa	Niue
New Zealand	—	18–9	19–10	19–16
India	9–18	—	16–16	23–6
South Africa	10–19	16–16	—	26–9
Niue	16–19	6–23	9–26	—

=== Section C ===
Rank	Nation	Athletes	MP	MW	MT	ML	FR	AG	PD	PTS
1	England	Amy Pharaoh, Sophie Tolchard	3	3	0	0	52	33	+19	9
2	Northern Ireland	Shauna O'Neill, Megan Devlin	3	1	0	2	47	43	+4	3
3	Fiji	Losalini Tukai, Litia Tikoisuva	3	1	0	2	43	51	-8	3
4	Scotland	Hannah Smith, Claire Johnston	3	1	0	32	35	50	-15	3

	England	Northern Ireland	Fiji	Scotland
England	—	14–13	19–13	19–7
Northern Ireland	13–14	—	16–17	18–12
Fiji	13–19	17–16	—	13–16
Scotland	7–19	12–18	16–14	—

=== Section D ===
Rank	Nation	Athletes	MP	MW	MT	ML	FR	AG	PD	PTS
1	Australia	Kristina Krstic, Ellen Ryan	3	3	0	0	85	35	+50	9
2	Wales	Sara Nicholls, Caroline Taylor	3	1	1	1	58	45	+13	4
3	Brunei	Norafizah Matossen, Esmawandy Brahim	3	1	0	2	37	63	-26	3
4	Canada	Jacqueline Foster, Jordan Kos	3	0	1	2	34	71	-37	1

	Australia	Wales	Brunei	Canada
Australia	—	21–15	24–14	40–6
Wales	15–21	—	25–14	27–8
Brunei	14–24	8–27	—	15–12
Canada	6–40	16–16	12–15	—

== Knockout stage ==
Quarterfinals
A1	Malaysia	15
C2	Northern Ireland	11
D1	Australia	19
A2	Norfolk Island	12
B1	New Zealand	16
D2	Wales	15
C1	England	19
B2	India	12

Semifinals
A1	Malaysia	10
D1	Australia	13
B1	New Zealand	12
C1	England	19

Final
D1	Australia	19
C1	England	18
Third place
A1	Malaysia	15
B1	New Zealand	20
