= Naveet Rathi =

Indian lawn bowler

Naveet Rathi Singh
Personal information
- Nationality: India
Medal record
Representing India
Asia Pacific Bowls Championships
Bronze medal – third place	2019 Gold Coast	triples

Naveet Rathi Singh is an Indian international Indian lawn bowler.

== Bowls career ==
=== World Championships ===
He competed for India at the 2016 World Outdoor Bowls Championship in New Zealand. In 2020 he was selected for the 2020 World Outdoor Bowls Championship in Australia.

=== Asia Pacific ===
Rathi won a triples bronze medal at the 2019 Asia Pacific Bowls Championships in the Gold Coast, Queensland.
