= Tzvika Hadar (bowls) =

Israeli lawn bowler (born 1958)

Personal information
- Native name: צביקה הדר
- Nationality: Israeli
- Born: 1958
Medal record
Representing (Israel)
Atlantic Bowls Championships
Bronze medal – third place	2015 Cyprus	pairs
European Championships
Bronze medal – third place	2011 Portugal	mixed
Bronze medal – third place	2022 Ayr	triples

Tzvika Hadar (Hebrew: צביקה הדר; born 1958) is an Israeli international lawn bowler.

== Bowls career ==
Hadar represented Israel at three World Championships (the sport's blue riband event); the 2004 World Outdoor Bowls Championship, the 2012 World Outdoor Bowls Championship and the 2016 World Outdoor Bowls Championship.

In 2011, he won a bronze medal at the European Bowls Championships in Portugal and won a pairs bronze medal (with Daniel Alonim), at the 2015 Atlantic Bowls Championships.

Hadar was selected as part of the five man team by Israel for his fourth World Championship at the 2020 World Outdoor Bowls Championship but the event was cancelled due to the COVID-19 pandemic. In 2022, he won triples bronze at the European Bowls Championships.

In 2023, he was selected as part of the team to represent Israel at the 2023 World Outdoor Bowls Championship. He participated in the men's triples and the men's singles events.

In 2024, he qualified with his older brother for the pairs competition at the 2024 World Indoor Bowls Championship. He had qualified for the 2023 Scottish International but chose not to participate due to the Gaza war.

He has also served as the European Bowls Union President and had a career in real estate.
