= Ashleigh Rainey =

Irish bowler

Personal information
- Nationality: British (Northern Irish)
- Born: 28 April 1985 (age 41)

Sport
- Sport: Lawn bowls
- Club: Ewarts BC (outdoors)
Medal record
Representing combined Ireland
Atlantic Bowls Championships
Bronze medal – third place	2011 Paphos	fours
Bronze medal – third place	2019 Cardiff	triples
European Bowls Championships
Gold medal – first place	2022 Ayr	triples
Irish Nationals
Gold medal – first place	2018	triples
Gold medal – first place	2023	pairs
Gold medal – first place	2024	fours

Ashleigh Rainey (born 28 April 1985) is a Northern Irish international lawn and indoor bowler.

== Bowls career ==
Ashleigh has played for Ireland both indoors and outdoors.

In 2019, she won the triples bronze medal at the Atlantic Bowls Championships and in 2020, she was selected for the 2020 World Outdoor Bowls Championship in Australia but the event was cancelled due to the COVID-19 pandemic.

In 2022, she competed in the women's triples and the Women's fours at the 2022 Commonwealth Games. During 2002, she also won a gold medal at the European Bowls Championships in the triples with Chloe Wilson and Lara Reaney.

In 2023, she won her second national title, after winning the pairs at the Irish National finals. Shortly afterwards in 2023, she was selected as part of the team to represent Ireland at the 2023 World Outdoor Bowls Championship. She participated in the women's pairs and the women's fours events.

Rainey won a third title at the 2024 Nationals in the fours.
