= Megan Devlin =

Personal information
- Nationality: British (Northern Irish)
- Born: 10 June 1993 (age 31)

Sport
- Sport: Lawn bowls
- Club: Ballymena BC (outdoors)

Megan Devlin (born 10 June 1993) is a Northern Irish international lawn bowler.

== Bowls career ==
Devlin won a Gold medal at the European Championships in 2017. She has also captained the Irish U-25 Team before being called up to the senior team.

In 2020, she was selected for the 2020 World Outdoor Bowls Championship in Australia.

In 2022, she competed in the women's pairs and the Women's fours at the 2022 Commonwealth Games.
