= Eireann Nugent =

Northern Ireland boxer (born 1992)

Personal information
- Born: Eireann Cathlin Nugent; 1 April 1992 (age 34)
- Height: 165 cm (5 ft 5 in)

Boxing career
- Stance: Orthodox
Medal record
Women's amateur boxing
Representing Northern Ireland
Commonwealth Games
Bronze medal – third place	2022 Birmingham	Light middleweight

Eireann Cathlin Nugent (/ˈeɪrən ˈnuːdjənt/; born 1 April 1992) is a boxer from Northern Ireland. She participated in the 2022 Commonwealth Games.
