= Dee Hoggan =

Scottish lawn and indoor bowls player

Personal information
- Nationality: British (Scottish)
- Born: 30 May 1990 (age 36)

Sport
- Sport: Bowls
- Club: Tranent BC (outdoors); East Lothian IBC (indoors)
Medal record
Representing Scotland
Hong Kong International Bowls Classic
Gold medal – first place	2023	pairs
British Isles Championships
Gold medal – first place	2018	singles
European Championships
Silver medal – second place	2019 Guernsey	team

Dee Hoggan (born 30 May 1990) is a Scottish international lawn and indoor bowler.

== Bowls career ==
In 2016, she won the national mixed pairs title with her uncle and the following year she became the National Singles Champion at the Scottish National Bowls Championships. After winning the 2017 Scottish National singles title she subsequently won the singles at the British Isles Bowls Championships in 2018.

In 2019, she won a silver medal at the European Bowls Championships and in 2020, she was selected for the 2020 World Outdoor Bowls Championship in Australia.

In 2022, she competed in the women's singles and the women's triples at the 2022 Commonwealth Games.

In 2023, she won the gold medal in the pairs with Rachel Sinclair, at the Hong Kong International Bowls Classic.
