= Parvati Tirkey =

Indian Hindi-language poet

Parvati Tirkey (born 16 January 1994) is an Indian poet, educator, and researcher from the Gumla district of Jharkhand. Belonging to the Kurukh tribal community, she is recognized for her contributions to contemporary Hindi literature. Her debut poetry collection Phir Ugna earned her the Sahitya Akademi Yuva Puraskar in 2025.

== Early life and education ==
Parvati Tirkey was born on 16 January 1994 in Gumla, Jharkhand. She received her early education at Jawahar Navodaya Vidyalaya, Gumla. She went on to pursue her undergraduate and postgraduate studies in Hindi literature at Banaras Hindu University (BHU) in Varanasi. She later completed her Doctor of Philosophy (Ph.D.) from the Department of Hindi at BHU, with her research focusing on "Kudukh Adivasi Geet: Jeevan Raag aur Jeevan Sangharsh" (Kudukh Tribal Songs: Rhythm of Life and Struggle).

== Academic career ==
Tirkey serves as an assistant professor in the Department of Hindi at Ram Lakhan Singh Yadav College, affiliated with Ranchi University. Her academic and literary work explores the convergence of tribal oral traditions, folk songs, and modern Hindi poetry, seeking to bridge indigenous experiences with mainstream literary discourse.

== Literary contributions ==
Tirkey's first poetry collection, Phir Ugna, was published by Radhakrishna Prakashan in 2023. The collection has been noted for its sensitive, direct, and communicative style. Through her poetry, Tirkey brings to life a world populated by earth, trees, birds, forests, and celestial elements, not merely as metaphors but as living presences.

Her verses are deeply rooted in tribal life and philosophy, portrayed without romanticization or artificial constructs. The collection captures the conflict between modernity and indigenous identity, offering reflections on cultural loss, ecological awareness, and the silent resilience of marginalized communities.

== Recognition ==
- Pralek Navlekhan Samman 2023
- Sahitya Akademi Yuva Puraskar, 2025 – for her poetry collection Phir Ugna.

== In popular culture ==
Parvati Tirkey has featured in a BBC documentary where she talks about her life and influences: "Parvati Tirkey: The Sahitya Akademi winner preserving Kurukh culture through poetry"
