= Jacqueline Foster (bowls) =

Canadian lawn bowler (born 1975)

Jackie Foster
Personal information
- Born: 14 December 1975 (age 50) Middleton, Canada

Sport
- Sport: Lawn bowls
- Club: Dartmouth LBC
Medal record
Representing Canada
Asia Pacific Bowls Championships
| Bronze medal – third place | 2011 Adelaide | fours |
| Bronze medal – third place | 2019 Gold Coast | triples |

Jacqueline Lee Foster (born 14 December 1975) is a Canadian international lawn bowler.

== Career ==
She was born in Middleton, Canada and represented Canada during the 2014 Commonwealth Games.

She was selected as part of the Canadian team for the 2018 Commonwealth Games on the Gold Coast in Queensland where she reached the semi-finals of the Fours with Pricilla Westlake, Leanne Chinery and Joanna Cooper. Foster won her second medal at the Asia Pacific Bowls Championships, during the 2019 Asia Pacific Bowls Championships in the Gold Coast, Queensland.

In 2020 she was selected for the 2020 World Outdoor Bowls Championship in Australia and in 2022, she competed in the women's pairs and the Women's fours at the 2022 Commonwealth Games.

In 2022, Foster won her first national title when winning the fours at the Canadian National Bowls Championships, with Lorraine Bezanson and her sister Tammy and her mother Debbie. Foster then won a second national fours title in 2024.
