= Shauna O'Neill =

Northern Irish lawn bowler (born 2000)

Personal information
- Nationality: British (Northern Irish)
- Born: 18 January 2000 (age 26)

Sport
- Sport: Lawn bowls
- Club: Limavady BC (outdoors)

Achievements and titles
- Highest world ranking: 6 (August 2026)
Medal record
Representing combined Ireland
World Outdoor Championships
Bronze medal – third place	2023 Gold Coast	triples
Atlantic Bowls Championships
Bronze medal – third place	2019 Cardiff	triples
European Bowls Championships
Silver medal – second place	2024 Ayr	pairs
British Bowls Championships
Gold medal – first place	2025 Llandrindod Wells	singles
Gold medal – first place	2026 Ayr	singles, triples
Representing Northern Ireland
Commonwealth Games
Bronze medal – third place	2026 Glasgow	pairs

Shauna O'Neill (born 18 January 2000) is a Northern Irish international lawn bowler. She reached her highest world ranking of number 6 in August 2026.

== Bowls career ==
Shauna won the Irish U-25 singles in 2019.

In 2019, she won the triples bronze medal at the Atlantic Bowls Championships and in 2020 she was selected for the 2020 World Outdoor Bowls Championship in Australia.

In 2022, she competed in the women's singles and the women's pairs at the 2022 Commonwealth Games.

In 2023, she was selected by combined Ireland national team, to represent them at the sport's blue riband event, the 2023 World Bowls Championship. She participated in the women's triples and the women's fours events. In the triples partnering Sophie McIntyre and Chloe Wilson, the team won a bronze medal after losing to Australia in the semi finals.

O'Neill finished 2023 with a double success at the IIBC Championships, winning the singles and pairs titles. In 2024 she won a silver medal at the 2024 European Bowls Championships in the pairs.

O'Neill won her first title at the 2024 Irish National Bowls Championships, when winning the singles and subsequently won the singles at the 2025 British Championships. She then successfully retained her Irish singles title at the 2025 Nationals in Lurgan and also picked up a triples crown with Limavady BC.

Playing with Chloe Wilson, she won the bronze medal in the women's pairs at the 2026 Commonwealth Games in Glasgow.

== Personal life ==
O'Neill is a post office manager by trade.
