= Leanne Chinery =

Canadian lawn bowler

Personal information
- Nationality: Canadian
- Born: Leanne Marie Chinery; 24 November 1981 (age 44) Chilliwack, British Columbia

Sport
- Sport: Lawn bowls

Leanne Marie Chinery (born 24 November 1981) is a Canadian international lawn bowler.

== Bowls career ==
She was born in Chilliwack, British Columbia and represented Canada at the 2006 Commonwealth Games and the 2014 Commonwealth Games.

She was selected as part of the Canadian team for the 2018 Commonwealth Games on the Gold Coast in Queensland where she reached the semi-finals of the fours with Joanna Cooper, Pricilla Westlake and Jackie Foster.

Chinery won a triples bronze medal at the 2019 Asia Pacific Bowls Championships in the Gold Coast, Queensland.

In 2020, she was selected for the 2020 World Outdoor Bowls Championship in Australia but the event was cancelled due to the COVID-19 pandemic.

In 2022, she competed in the women's triples and the Women's fours at the 2022 Commonwealth Games.

In 2024, Chinery won the Australian Open fours title with Louise Cronan, Emma Boyd and Kelly McKerihen.

== Personal life ==
Her partner is fellow bowls international Tony Grantham of New Zealand.
