= Pricilla Westlake =

Canadian international lawn bowler (born 1995)

Personal information
- Nationality: Canadian
- Born: 30 September 1995 (age 30) Lae, Papua New Guinea

Sport
- Sport: Lawn bowls

Pricilla Westlake (born 30 September 1995) is a Canadian international lawn bowler.

She was born in Lae, Papua New Guinea and was selected as part of the Canadian team for the 2018 Commonwealth Games on the Gold Coast in Queensland where she reached the semi-finals of the Fours with Joanna Cooper, Leanne Chinery and Jackie Foster.

She won gold medal in the women's singles at the 2017 World Youth Championships, becoming the first Canadian to win a medal at the event.
