= Pricilla de Oliveira Azevedo =

Brazilian police officer

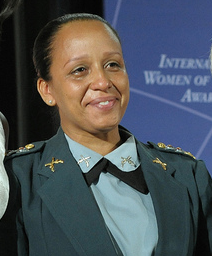
- Pricilla de Oliveira Azevedo at the International Women of Courage Award in 2012.
- Born: c. 1978
- Occupation: police officer

Major Pricilla de Oliveira Azevedo (born c. 1978) is a Brazilian police officer who has won international awards for her service.

== Life ==
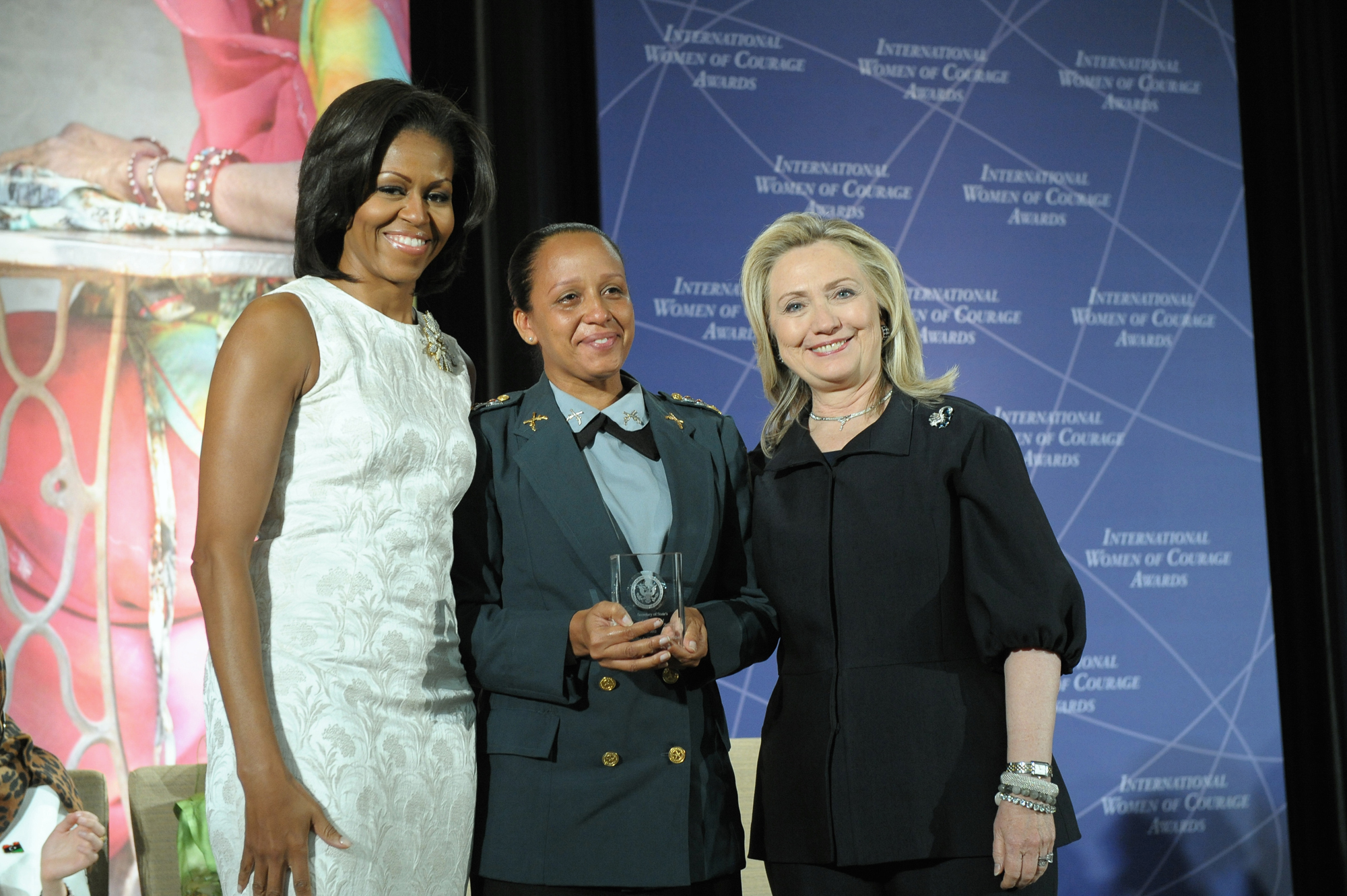
Pricilla de Oliveira Azevedo along Michelle Obama and Hillary Clinton received the International Women of Courage Award in 2012.

She was born in about 1978 and she was brought up in Laranjeiras neighborhood. She arrested people who had earlier kidnapped her and held her prisoner.

In 1998 she joined the Military Police of Rio de Janeiro State, and in 2000 she began working in street repression operations and police battalions. In 2007 she was kidnapped and attacked, but she escaped and managed to arrest three of her kidnappers. In 2008 she was placed in charge of the first “Police Pacification Unit” (UPP) in Rio de Janeiro, in the favela of Santa Marta. As of January 2014 she is the chief of the Police Pacification Unit in Rocinha, which she became chief of in 2013 after its officers were accused of being involved in the disappearance of a local man.

She received a 2012 International Women of Courage award, and Veja named her Defender of the City.
