= Litia Tikoisuva =

Fijian lawn bowler

Personal information
- Full name: Litia Botei Tikoisuva
- Born: 2 May 1963 (age 63) Gau, Colony of Fiji, British Empire
- Height: 170 cm (5 ft 7 in) (2018)
- Weight: 72 kg (159 lb) (2018)

Sport
- Sport: Lawn bowls
Medal record
Women's lawn bowls
Representing Fiji
World Outdoor Championships
Bronze medal – third place	1996 Leamington Spa	Women's Pairs
Asia Pacific Bowls Championships
Silver medal – second place	2003 Brisbane	pairs
Bronze medal – third place	2003 Brisbane	fours
Gold medal – first place	2005 Melbourne	singles
Bronze medal – third place	2011 Adelaide	singles
Bronze medal – third place	2015 Christchurch	triples
Pacific Games
Gold medal – first place	2019 Samoa	singles

Litia Botei Tikoisuva (born 2 May 1963) is a Fijian international female lawn bowler.

== Biography ==
Tikoisuva won a pairs bronze medal with Radhika Prasad at the 1996 World Outdoor Bowls Championship in Victoria Park in Royal Leamington Spa, England.

She has won five medals at the Asia Pacific Bowls Championships including the women's singles gold medal at the 2005 Championships in Melbourne.

In 2019, she won a gold medal at the Pacific Games in the singles event and in 2020, she was selected for the 2020 World Outdoor Bowls Championship in Australia. In 2022, she competed in the women's singles and the women's pairs at the 2022 Commonwealth Games.

In 2023, she was selected as part of the team to represent Fiji at the 2023 World Outdoor Bowls Championship. She participated in the women's triples and the women's fours events.
