= Lucy Beere =

Guernsey bowls player

Lucy Beere MBE
Personal information
- Nationality: British (Guernsey)
- Born: 7 July 1982 (age 43) Newport, Isle of Wight
Medal record
Representing Guernsey
Commonwealth Games
| Silver medal – second place | 2022 Birmingham | Singles |
World Singles Champion of Champions
| Silver medal – second place | 2009 Gold Coast | singles |
| Silver medal – second place | 2023 Gold Coast | singles |
World Cup Singles
| Silver medal – second place | 2017 Warilla | singles |
| Gold medal – first place | 2018 Warilla | singles |
| Silver medal – second place | 2019 Warilla | singles |
Atlantic Bowls Championships
| Silver medal – second place | 2019 Cardiff | singles |
| Silver medal – second place | 2019 Cardiff | pairs |
European Championships
| Gold medal – first place | 2009 Cyprus | singles |
| Gold medal – first place | 2019 Guernsey | pairs |
| Gold medal – first place | 2019 Guernsey | mixed four |
| Gold medal – first place | 2019 Guernsey | team |

Lucy Kate Beere MBE (born 7 July 1982) is a Guernsey international lawn and indoor bowler.

== Bowls career ==
She has represented Guernsey at four Commonwealth Games; competing in the 2010 Commonwealth Games in Delhi, the 2014 Commonwealth Games in Glasgow, the 2018 Commonwealth Games in the Gold Coast and the 2022 Commonwealth Games in Birmingham where she won a silver medal in the singles event. In 2018, she defeated Rebecca Van Asch in the final of the World Cup Singles

In 2019, she won the singles and pairs silver medal at the Atlantic Bowls Championships and during the same year she won three gold medals at the European Bowls Championships.

In 2020, she was selected for the 2020 World Outdoor Bowls Championship in Australia but the event was cancelled due to the COVID-19 pandemic.

In 2022, she competed in the women's singles and the women's pairs at the 2022 Commonwealth Games. At the Games, Beere won Guernsey's first medal in 28 years, by winning the silver medal in the singles event where she lost by 21 shots to 17 in the final to Australian Ellen Ryan.

In 2023, she was selected again as part of the team to represent Guernsey at the 2023 World Outdoor Bowls Championship. She participated in the women's singles and the women's pairs events.

Shortly after the World Championships and still on the Gold Coast, Beere won the silver medal at the World Singles Champion of Champions for the second time, losing to Anne Nunes in the final, 2–5, 4–3, 3–6. Beere won a bronze medal at the 2024 European Bowls Championships.

== Honours ==
Beere was appointed Member of the Order of the British Empire (MBE) in the 2023 New Year Honours for services to bowls on Guernsey.
