= Ellen Fife =

Australian lawn bowler

Ellen Fife (née Ellen Ryan)
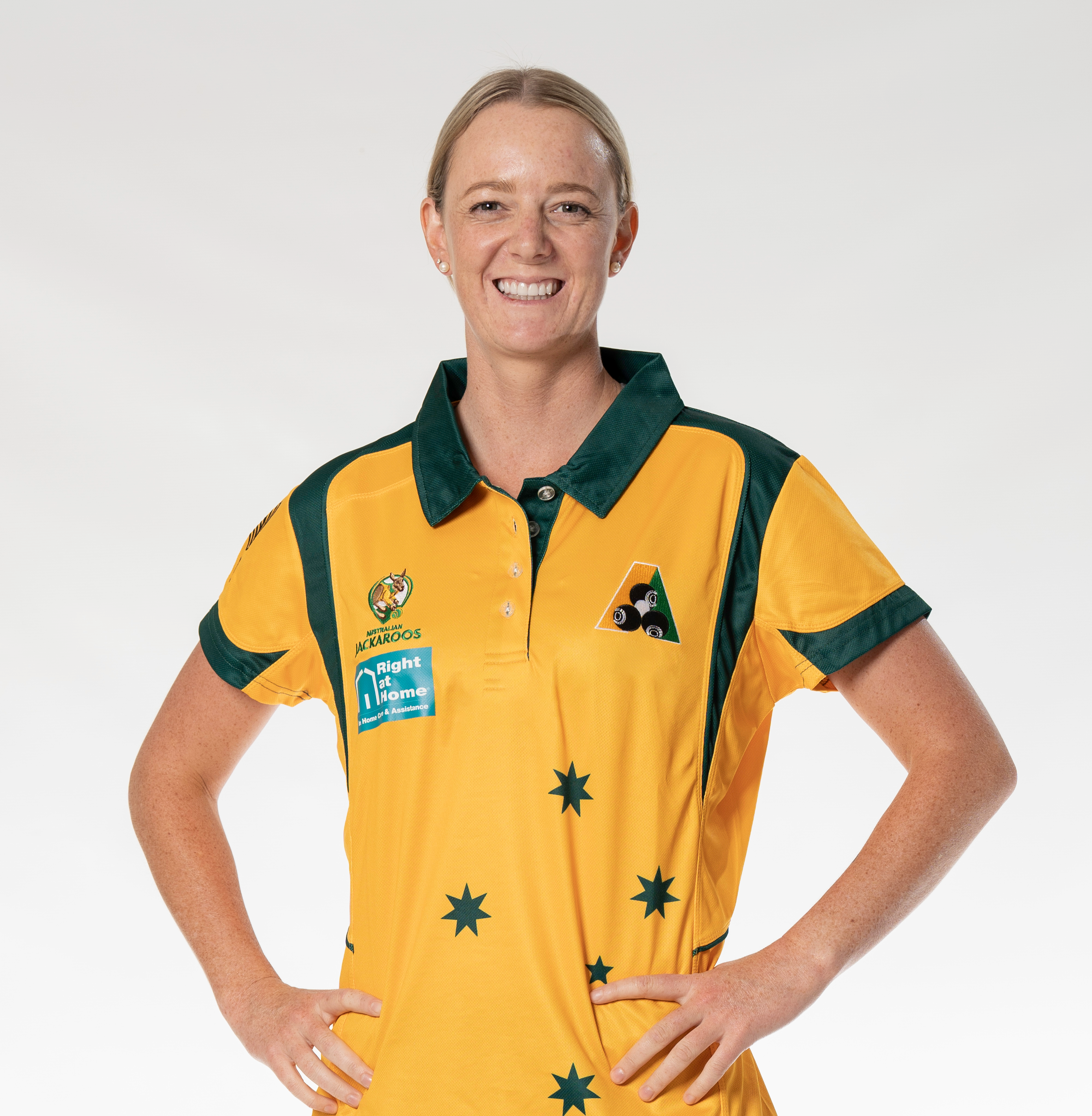

Personal information
- Nationality: Australian
- Born: Ellen Ryan; 23 March 1997 (age 29) Goulburn, New South Wales, Australia

Sport
- Sport: Lawn and indoor bowls
- Club: Cabramatta Bowling Club

Achievements and titles
- Highest world ranking: 3 (August 2024)
Medal record
Women's bowls
Representing Australia
World Outdoor Championships
Bronze medal – third place	2023 Gold Coast	singles
Bronze medal – third place	2023 Gold Coast	team
Commonwealth Games
Gold medal – first place	2022 Birmingham	Singles
Gold medal – first place	2022 Birmingham	Pairs
World Indoor Bowls Championships
Gold medal – first place	U25 singles	2017

Ellen Fife (née Ryan) (born 23 March 1997) is an Australian international lawn and indoor bowler. She reached a career high ranking of world number 3 in August 2024.

== Bowls career ==
Ryan made her international debut during the 2017 Australia v England Test Series and won the Australian Open singles and pairs gold medal in 2017. She was the first person to hold both the indoor and outdoor world under-25 singles titles simultaneously.

In 2018, Ryan won the Hong Kong International Bowls Classic pairs title with Natasha Scott. The following year in 2019, she won the Australian National Bowls Championships fours.

In 2020, Ryan was selected for the 2020 World Outdoor Bowls Championship in Australia but the event was cancelled due to the COVID-19 pandemic.

In 2022, Ryan competed in the women's singles and the women's pairs at the 2022 Commonwealth Games in Birmingham. In the singles event, Ryan won the gold medal, defeating Lucy Beere in the final by 21 shots to 17. In the pairs with Kristina Krstic, she secured the double gold.

In 2023, she was selected again as part of the team to represent Australia at the 2023 World Outdoor Bowls Championship. She participated in the women's singles and the women's pairs events. In the singles, Ryan won her group undefeated before reaching the semi final where she lost to Tayla Bruce. Later in October 2023, Ryan won the Australian National Bowls Championships fours title with Jamie-Lee Worsnop, Ellen Falkner and Karen Murphy

In 2024, playing under her married name of Ellen Fife, she won the Australian Open pairs with Krstic, it was Fife's fourth Australian Open title.

== Awards ==
Ryan was awarded the 2017 Young Player of the Year by the World Bowls Tour.
