= Tania Choudhury (bowls) =

Indian lawn bowler (born 1995)

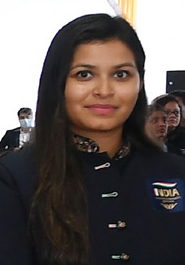
- Choudhury in August 2022

Personal information
- Nationality: Indian
- Born: 13 June 1995 (age 31) Guwahati, Assam, India
Medal record
Representing India
Asia Pacific Bowls Championships
| Bronze medal – third place | 2009 Kuala Lumpur | fours |
| Bronze medal – third place | 2019 Gold Coast | singles |
| Bronze medal – third place | 2019 Gold Coast | triples |

Tania Choudhury (born 13 June 1995) is an Indian women's international lawn bowler. She hails from Guwahati, an Engineering graduate from Assam Engineering College and an MBA from the Tezpur University, Assam.

== Bowls career ==
=== World Championships ===
In 2020, she was selected for the 2020 World Outdoor Bowls Championship in Australia, which resulted in cancellation following the COVID-19 pandemic. She was selected by the Indian national team, to represent them at the sport's blue riband event, the 2023 World Bowls Championship. She participated in the women's singles and the women's triples events.

=== Commonwealth Games ===
Choudhury has represented India at two Commonwealth Games in 2010 when she became the youngest lawn bowls player to compete at the 2010 Commonwealth Games where her triples team finished top of Pool B but missed out on a bronze medal after losing to England in the play off. Four years later she competed at the 2014 Commonwealth Games.

In 2022, she competed in the women's singles and the women's triples at the 2022 Commonwealth Games.

=== Asia Pacific ===
Choudhury has won three medals at the Asia Pacific Bowls Championships. She won a fours bronze medal in 2009 and a double bronze in the singles and triples at the 2019 Asia Pacific Bowls Championships in the Gold Coast, Queensland.
