= 2012 World Outdoor Bowls Championship – Men's fours =

Bowling championship

World Outdoor Championships 2012 men's fours
- 12th World Outdoor Bowls Championships
- Location: Adelaide, Australia
- Date: 24 November – 9 December 2012.
- Category: 2012 World Outdoor Bowls Championship

The 2012 World Outdoor Bowls Championship men's fours was held at the Lockleys Bowling Club in Adelaide, Australia. Some of the qualifying rounds were held at the nearby Holdfast Bowling Club in Glenelg North.

Mark Casey, Brett Wilkie, Wayne Ruediger and Aron Sherriff won the men's fours gold.

== Section tables ==
=== Pool 1 ===
Pos	Player	P	W	D	F	A	L	Pts	Shots
1	(Republic of Ireland) Neil Booth, Ian McClure, James Talbot, Paul Daly	11	9	0	2	192	143	18	+49
2	(Wales) Jason Greenslade, Jonathan Tomlinson, Chris Blake, Andrew Fleming	11	8	1	2	213	146	17	+67
3	(England) Stuart Airey, Robert Newman, Graham Shadwell, Mark Bantock	11	7	2	2	218	136	16	+82
4	(New Zealand) Richard Girvan, Ali Forsyth, Matt Gallop, Tony Grantham	11	7	1	3	233	133	15	+100
5	(Malaysia) Azwan Shuhaimi, Fairus Jabal, Khairul Anuar Abdul Kadir, Soufi Rusli	11	7	1	3	210	155	15	+55
6	(Namibia) Willem Esterhuizen, Douw Calitz, Ewald Vermeulen, Jean Viljoen	11	6	1	4	192	171	13	+21
7	(Zimbabwe) Roy Garden, Tom Craven, Manuel Silva, Clive Robertson	11	4	0	7	183	181	8	+2
8	(Spain) Frank Pain, Paul Brown, Brian Robertson, Graham Cathcart, John Muldoon	11	4	0	7	156	232	8	-76
9	(China) Ricky Wong, Jimmy Tam, Another, Another	11	4	0	7	149	229	8	-80
10	(Israel) Colin Silberstein, Roy Ben-Ari, Noam Yehudai, Dan Slodovnik	11	3	0	8	162	207	6	-45
11	(Brunei) Brahim Haji Naim, Haiji Ibrahim Haiji Rosli, Bujang Md Ali, Another	11	3	0	8	151	220	6	-69
12	Thailand	11	1	0	10	131	237	2	-106

=== Pool 2 ===
Pos	Player	P	W	D	F	A	L	Pts	Shots
1	(Australia) Aron Sherriff, Mark Casey, Brett Wilkie & Wayne Ruediger	11	9	1	1	256	124	19	+132
2	(Scotland) Alex Marshall, Graeme Archer, Darren Burnett & David Peacock	11	8	0	3	233	136	16	+97
3	(South Africa) Gidion Vermeulen, Bobby Donnelly, Clinton Roets & Petrus Breitenbach	11	8	0	3	201	146	16	+55
4	(Canada) John Bezear, George Whitelaw, Michel Larue, Steve Santana	11	8	0	3	188	174	16	+14
5	(United States) Neil Furman, Loren Dion, Bill Brault, Aaron Zangl	11	7	1	3	196	181	15	+15
6	(Hong Kong) Danny Ho, Andy Chan, Stanley Lai, Alex Ng	11	5	1	5	206	182	11	+24
7	(Jersey) Thomas Greechan, Lee Nixon, Greg Davis, Jamie MacDonald	11	5	1	5	171	166	11	+5
8	(Philippines) Emmanuel Portacio, Christopher Dagpin, Ronald Lising, Angelo Morales	11	3	2	6	194	185	8	+9
9	(Fiji) Samuela Tuikiligana, Semesa Naiseravati, David Aitcheson, Abdul Kalim	11	3	1	7	173	216	7	-43
10	(Japan) Ken Emura, Hisaharu Satoh, Junji Goda, Hirokazu Mori	11	3	0	8	156	199	6	-43
11	(Botswana) Kitso Robert, Remmy Kebapetse, Joshua Mothusi, Kabo Gaboutloeloe	11	2	0	9	114	256	4	-142
12	(Brazil) Gary Oughton, Fabio d'Avila Melo, Peter Gordon, Alex Lojelo Munn	11	1	1	9	126	249	3	-123

== Finals ==
Play Offs
(Republic of Ireland) Ireland
bye
South Africa	16
England	15
Australia
bye
Scotland	19
Wales	15

Semifinals
(Republic of Ireland) Ireland	18
South Africa	19
Australia	23
Scotland	22

Gold medal
South Africa	13
Australia	22

== Results ==
Men's fours section 1
Round 1 – Nov 24		
England	New Zealand	18–12
China	Brunei	26–13
Namibia	Zimbabwe	17–13
Wales	Israel	21–12
Spain	Thailand	22–7
Malaysia	Ireland	25–4
Round 2 – Nov 24		
Namibia	Wales	23–11
Israel	Zimbabwe	15–13
England	Malaysia	19–19
China	Thailand	20–15
Ireland	New Zealand	16–13
Spain	Brunei	18–16
Round 3 – Nov 25		
Israel	China	26–12
New Zealand	Namibia	20–7
England	Zimbabwe	15–11
Ireland	Thailand	15–11
Wales	Spain	29–5
Brunei	Malaysia	19–12
Round 4 – Nov 25		
China	Zimbabwe	23–17
Malaysia	Thailand	23–10
Ireland	Spain	30–9
England	Israel	24–6
Wales	New Zealand	16–12
Namibia	Brunei	18–11
Round 5 – Nov 25		
Ireland	Israel	23–14
New Zealand	Spain	+
Wales	Malaysia	22–16
Namibia	China	23–14
Zimbabwe	Brunei	22–10
England	Thailand	30–4
Round 6 – Nov 26		
Ireland	Namibia	18–13
Wales	Thailand	24–10
Spain	Israel	22–19
England	China	22–12
Malaysia	Zimbabwe	24–21
New Zealand	Brunei	30–14
Round 7 – Nov 26		
Thailand	Israel	20–14
England	Namibia	17–17
New Zealand	China	30–5
Wales	Zimbabwe	15–15
Malaysia	Spain	22–11
Ireland	Brunei	15–11
Round 8 – Nov 27		
Namibia	Thailand	26–14
New Zealand	Zimbabwe	15–15
Ireland	England	18–11
Wales	Brunei	27–9
Malaysia	Israel	19–7
Spain	China	25–6
Round 9 – Nov 27		
Ireland	Wales	19–11
Malaysia	China	24–6
New Zealand	Israel	24–7
Namibia	Spain	26–11
England	Brunei	22–13
Zimbabwe	Thailand	18–13
Round 10 – Nov 28		
New Zealand	Thailand	28–13
Wales	China	20–10
Brunei	Israel	18–16
England	Spain	25–7
Malaysia	Namibia	16–11
Ireland	Zimbabwe	20–10
Round 11 – Nov 28		
Israel	Namibia	26–11
Wales	England	17–15
Brunei	Thailand	17–14
China	Ireland	15–14
New Zealand	Malaysia	25–10
Zimbabwe	Spain	28–14

Men's fours section 2
Round 1 – Nov 24		
Brazil	Jersey	17–13
Philippines	Japan	25–10
United States	Botswana	25–10
Australia	South Africa	15–10
Canada	Scotland	21–13
Hong Kong	Fiji	29–19
Round 2 – Nov 24		
Japan	Botswana	24–11
Australia	Scotland	15–13
United States	Philippines	20–18
Jersey	Fiji	18–10
Hong Kong	Brazil	19–7
Canada	South Africa	19–9
Round 3 – Nov 25		
United States	Canada	23–15
Botswana	Brazil	20–13
Australia	Fiji	19–19
South Africa	Hong Kong	21–15
Scotland	Japan	16–15
Jersey	Philippines	14–14
Round 4 – Nov 25		
Botswana	Hong Kong	15–14
United States	Fiji	22–9
Canada	Japan	22–12
South Africa	Brazil	15–13
Jersey	Australia	20–16
Scotland	Philippines	20–10
Round 5 – Nov 25		
Scotland	Brazil	46–4
Australia	Philippines	21–12
Canada	Jersey	16–12
Fiji	Botswana	20–12
United States	Hong Kong	22–15
South Africa	Japan	17–14
Round 6 – Nov 26		
Scotland	Fiji	21–11
South Africa	Botswana	33–4
Australia	United States	21–12
Hong Kong	Canada	28–8
Jersey	Japan	21–11
Philippines	Brazil	26–9
Round 7 – Nov 26		
Hong Kong	Jersey	18–12
Canada	Philippines	17–14
Scotland	United States	28–6
Australia	Botswana	36–5
South Africa	Fiji	20–16
Japan	Brazil	16–12
Round 8 – Nov 27		
Japan	Fiji	21–9
Australia	Hong Kong	34–10
Scotland	Australia	16–13
United States	Jersey	19–14
Canada	Brazil	21–14
Philippines	Botswana	29–9
Round 9 – Nov 27		
Jersey	Scotland	19–16
Canada	Botswana	18–14
Australia	Brazil	34–8
Hong Kong	Japan	26–9
South Africa	United States	18–13
Fiji	Philippines	25–18
Round 10 – Nov 28		
Scotland	Hong Kong	20–17
South Africa	Philippines	25–13
Canada	Fiji	24–13
Australia	Japan	23–8
Jersey	Botswana	20–9
Brazil	United States	17–17
Round 11 – Nov 28		
Hong Kong	Philippines	15–15
Scotland	Botswana	24–5
Australia	Canada	22–7
Fiji	Brazil	22–12
United States	Japan	17–16
South Africa	Jersey	20–8

+ Spain defaulted fixture against New Zealand due to illness and John Muldoon was a replacement
