= 2012 World Outdoor Bowls Championship – Men's triples =

Lawn bowls event

World Outdoor Championships 2012 men's triples
- 12th World Outdoor Bowls Championships
- Location: Adelaide, Australia
- Date(s): 24 November - 9 December 2012.
- Category: 2012 World Outdoor Bowls Championship

The 2012 World Outdoor Bowls Championship men's triples was held at the Lockleys Bowling Club in Adelaide, Australia. Some of the qualifying Rounds were held at the nearby Holdfast Bowling Club in Glenelg North.

Graeme Archer, Darren Burnett and David Peacock won the men's triples Gold.

== Section tables ==
=== Pool 1 ===
| Pos | Player | P | W | D | F | A | L | Pts | Shots |
|---|---|---|---|---|---|---|---|---|---|
| 1 | (Scotland) Graeme Archer, Darren Burnett, David Peacock | 11 | 9 | 1 | 1 | 196 | 129 | 19 | +67 |
| 2 | (Japan) Kenichi Emura, Hisaharu Satoh, Kenta Hasebe | 11 | 8 | 0 | 3 | 175 | 149 | 16 | +26 |
| 3 | (Republic of Ireland) Neil Booth, James Talbot, Paul Daly | 11 | 7 | 1 | 3 | 160 | 134 | 15 | +26 |
| 4 | (South Africa) Gidion Vermeulen, Bobby Donnelly, Clinton Roets | 11 | 7 | 0 | 4 | 188 | 129 | 14 | +59 |
| 5 | (Malaysia) Azwan Shuhaimi, Fairus Jabal, Khairul Anuar Abdul Kadir | 11 | 6 | 1 | 4 | 165 | 148 | 13 | +17 |
| 6 | (Wales) Jonathan Tomlinson, Chris Blake, Andrew Fleming | 11 | 6 | 0 | 5 | 165 | 147 | 12 | +18 |
| 7 | (England) Stuart Airey, Robert Newman, Mark Bantock | 11 | 6 | 0 | 5 | 151 | 140 | 12 | +11 |
| 8 | (Hong Kong) Robin Chok, Stanley Lai, Alex Ng | 11 | 5 | 1 | 5 | 151 | 170 | 11 | -19 |
| 9 | (Israel) Tzvika Hadar, Noam Yehudai, Dan Slodovnik | 11 | 2 | 3 | 6 | 125 | 168 | 7 | -43 |
| 10 | (United States) Steve Nelson, Loren Dion, Bill Brault | 11 | 2 | 2 | 7 | 124 | 182 | 6 | -58 |
| 11 | Thailand | 11 | 2 | 0 | 9 | 125 | 177 | 4 | -52 |
| 12 | (Spain) Nick Cole, Brian Robertson, Graham Cathcart | 11 | 1 | 1 | 9 | 120 | 172 | 3 | -52 |

=== Pool 2 ===
| Pos | Player | P | W | D | L | F | A | Pts | Shots |
|---|---|---|---|---|---|---|---|---|---|
| 1 | (New Zealand) Ali Forsyth, Matt Gallop, Tony Grantham | 11 | 9 | 2 | 0 | 222 | 102 | 20 | +120 |
| 2 | (Australia) Mark Casey, Brett Wilkie, Wayne Ruediger | 11 | 9 | 0 | 2 | 206 | 134 | 18 | +72 |
| 3 | (China) Terence Lee, Ricky Wong, Jimmy Tam | 11 | 7 | 0 | 4 | 155 | 149 | 14 | +6 |
| 4 | (Jersey) Thomas Greechan, Jamie MacDonald, Lee Nixon | 11 | 6 | 1 | 4 | 168 | 126 | 13 | +42 |
| 5 | (Philippines) Angelo Morales, Ronald Lising, Emmanuel Portacio | 11 | 6 | 0 | 5 | 151 | 153 | 12 | -2 |
| 6 | (Namibia) Graham Snyman, Lorato Ketshabe, Ewald Vermeulen, Jean Viljoen | 11 | 5 | 1 | 5 | 160 | 158 | 11 | +2 |
| 7 | (Canada) George Whitelaw, Michel Larue, Steve Santana | 11 | 5 | 0 | 6 | 162 | 167 | 10 | -5 |
| 8 | (Zimbabwe) Roy Garden, Tom Craven, Manuel Silva | 11 | 5 | 0 | 6 | 140 | 150 | 10 | -10 |
| 9 | (Fiji) Samuela Tuikiligana, Arun Kumar, Abdul Kalim | 11 | 4 | 1 | 6 | 153 | 166 | 9 | -13 |
| 10 | (Botswana) Kitso Robert, Remmy Kebapetswe, Kabo Gaboutloeloe | 11 | 4 | 0 | 7 | 119 | 209 | 8 | -90 |
| 11 | (Brunei) Brahim Haji Naim, Haiji Ibrahim Haiji Rosli, Bujang Md Ali | 11 | 3 | 1 | 7 | 141 | 154 | 7 | -13 |
| 12 | (Brazil) Gary Oughton, Fabio Melo, Ascendino Melo Neto | 11 | 0 | 0 | 11 | 99 | 208 | 0 | -109 |

== Finals ==
Play Offs
Scotland
bye
(Republic of Ireland) Ireland | 15
Japan | 10
New Zealand
bye
Australia | 13
China | 11

Semifinals
Scotland | 17
(Republic of Ireland) Ireland | 5
New Zealand | 10
Australia | 12

Gold medal
Scotland | 13
Australia | 12

== Results ==
Men's triples section 1
| Round 1 - Nov 29 | | |
| Scotland | Malaysia | 18-12 |
| Japan | Thailand | 14-12 |
| South Africa | Hong Kong | 19-15 |
| Wales | Israel | 23-7 |
| United States | Spain | 14-14 |
| England | Ireland | 18-10 |
| Round 2 - Nov 29 | | |
| Japan | United States | 21-16 |
| Malaysia | England | 17-10 |
| Thailand | Spain | 16-13 |
| Wales | Hong Kong | 22-10 |
| South Africa | Israel | 16-9 |
| Scotland | Ireland | 14-14 |
| Round 3 - Nov 30 | | |
| Thailand | England | 15-8 |
| Japan | Israel | 15-8 |
| Scotland | Hong Kong | 19-13 |
| Wales | Spain | 14-12 |
| Ireland | United States | 18-10 |
| South Africa | Malaysia | 20-7 |
| Round 4 - Nov 30 | | |
| Ireland | Spain | 15-9 |
| Japan | South Africa | 20-16 |
| Israel | Malaysia | 11-11 |
| Scotland | Wales | 20-10 |
| Hong Kong | Thailand | 19-6 |
| England | United States | 26-7 |
| Round 5 - Nov 30 | | |
| Hong Kong | Japan | 17-13 |
| Spain | Scotland | 12-11 |
| Ireland | Israel | 16-11 |
| United States | Malaysia | 18-13 |
| South Africa | Thailand | 19-12 |
| England | Wales | 13-11 |
| Round 6 - Dec 1 | | |
| Ireland | Hong Kong | 16-7 |
| Wales | United States | 10-10 |
| Israel | Spain | 14-11 |
| Japan | Malaysia | 19-15 |
| England | South Africa | 11-9 |
| Scotland | Thailand | 25-12 |
| Round 7 - Dec 1 | | |
| Wales | South Africa | 20-16 |
| England | Spain | 15-14 |
| Ireland | Thailand | 14-12 |
| Scotland | Japan | 25-13 |
| Malaysia | Hong Kong | 23-12 |
| Israel | United States | 13-13 |
| Round 8 - Dec 2 | | |
| Hong Kong | United States | 12-9 |
| Scotland | South Africa | 14-13 |
| Malaysia | Ireland | 16-12 |
| Wales | Thailand | 16-12 |
| England | Israel | 16-6 |
| Japan | Spain | 24-4 |
| Round 9 - Dec 2 | | |
| Hong Kong | Spain | 14-13 |
| Malaysia | Thailand | 19-6 |
| South Africa | United States | 19-5 |
| Ireland | Wales | 22-9 |
| Japan | England | 13-12 |
| Scotland | Israel | 17-13 |
| Round 10 - Dec 3 | | |
| Malaysia | Spain | 13-9 |
| Hong Kong | England | 15-13 |
| South Africa | Ireland | 19-7 |
| Scotland | United States | 18-8 |
| Japan | Wales | 14-8 |
| Israel | Thailand | 16-13 |
| Round 11 - Dec 3 | | |
| Hong Kong | Israel | 17-17 |
| United States | Thailand | 14-9 |
| Malaysia | Wales | 19-13 |
| Ireland | Japan | 16-9 |
| Scotland | England | 23-9 |
| South Africa | Spain | 22-9 |

Men's triples section 2
| Round 1 - Nov 29 | | |
| New Zealand | Australia | 13-10 |
| Canada | Fiji | 19-10 |
| Namibia | Zimbabwe | 22-7 |
| Jersey | Brazil | 14-7 |
| Brunei | Philippines | 17-5 |
| China | Botswana | 22-5 |
| Round 2 - Nov 29 | | |
| Zimbabwe | Brazil | 10-9 |
| Australia | Fiji | 21-13 |
| China | Philippines | 20-4 |
| Botswana | Brunei | 19-13 |
| Namibia | Jersey | 18-11 |
| New Zealand | Canada | 20-14 |
| Round 3 - Nov 30 | | |
| Namibia | Canada | 15-7 |
| Australia | Brunei | 19-14 |
| Philippines | Brazil | 21-7 |
| New Zealand | China | 20-4 |
| Botswana | Jersey | 17-14 |
| Zimbabwe | Fiji | 16-11 |
| Round 4 - Nov 30 | | |
| Botswana | Namibia | 14-11 |
| Zimbabwe | China | 19-7 |
| New Zealand | Brunei | 15-15 |
| Australia | Philippines | 17-10 |
| Fiji | Brazil | 34-3 |
| Jersey | Canada | 22-9 |
| Round 5 - Nov 30 | | |
| China | Namibia | 23-17 |
| Canada | Brunei | 16-14 |
| Philippines | Fiji | 14-11 |
| Australia | Jersey | 17-15 |
| New Zealand | Brazil | 25-6 |
| Zimbabwe | Botswana | 14-10 |
| Round 6 - Dec 1 | | |
| Canada | Botswana | 29-6 |
| Brunei | Brazil | 17-11 |
| Philippines | Jersey | 15-7 |
| Australia | Zimbabwe | 16-10 |
| New Zealand | Namibia | 30-6 |
| Fiji | China | 13-11 |
| Round 7 - Dec 1 | | |
| Namibia | Brazil | 21-7 |
| New Zealand | Philippines | 22-10 |
| China | Australia | 19-16 |
| Fiji | Botswana | 28-11 |
| Zimbabwe | Canada | 18-9 |
| Jersey | Brunei | 13-6 |
| Round 8 - Dec 2 | | |
| China | Brazil | 12-10 |
| Philippines | Botswana | 22-8 |
| New Zealand | Jersey | 10-10 |
| Brunei | Zimbabwe | 16-7 |
| Fiji | Namibia | 10-10 |
| Australia | Canada | 24-6 |
| Round 9 - Dec 2 | | |
| Australia | Brazil | 20-13 |
| New Zealand | Botswana | 24-7 |
| Jersey | Fiji | 23-9 |
| Philippines | Zimbabwe | 17-15 |
| China | Canada | 15-14 |
| Namibia | Brunei | 17-9 |
| Round 10 - Dec 3 | | |
| Australia | Namibia | 17-14 |
| Canada | Philippines | 20-10 |
| Fiji | Brunei | 17-12 |
| New Zealand | Zimbabwe | 17-13 |
| Botswana | Brazil | 15-13 |
| Jersey | China | 23-7 |
| Round 11 - Dec 3 | | |
| Jersey | Zimbabwe | 16-11 |
| China | Brunei | 15-8 |
| Canada | Brazil | 19-13 |
| Philippines | Namibia | 23-9 |
| Australia | Botswana | 29-7 |
| New Zealand | Fiji | 26-7 |
