= 2008 World Outdoor Bowls Championship – Men's fours =

Bowls championship held in Christchurch, New Zealand

World Outdoor Bowls Championships 2008 men's fours
- 11th World Outdoor Bowls Championships
- Location: Christchurch, New Zealand
- Date: 12–24 January 2008.
- Category: World Bowls Championship

The 2008 World Outdoor Bowls Championship men's fours was held at the Burnside Bowling Club in Christchurch, New Zealand, from 12 to 24 January 2008.

Andrew Todd, Richard Girvan, Russell Meyer and Gary Lawson won the men's fours gold medal.

== Section tables ==
=== Section A ===
| Pos | Player | P | W | D | L | F | A | Pts | Shots |
|---|---|---|---|---|---|---|---|---|---|
| 1 | (Scotland) Wayne Hogg, Billy Mellors, Willie Wood & David Peacock | 10 | 9 | 0 | 1 | 196 | 150 | 18 | +46 |
| 2 | (England) Mark Bantock, Stephen Farish, Robert Newman & Graham Shadwell | 10 | 7 | 2 | 1 | 217 | 106 | 16 | +111 |
| 3 | (Republic of Ireland) Jonathan Ross, Jim Baker, Jeremy Henry & Neil Booth | 10 | 7 | 0 | 3 | 192 | 137 | 14 | +55 |
| 4 | (Wales) Neil Rees, Martin Selway, Robert Horgan & Andrew Atwood | 10 | 5 | 2 | 3 | 186 | 143 | 12 | +43 |
| 5 | (Canada) Mark Sandford, Keith Roney, Chris Stadnyk & Hiren Bhartu | 10 | 6 | 0 | 4 | 189 | 147 | 12 | +42 |
| 6 | (Fiji) Arun Kumar, Samuela Tuikiligana, Curtis Mar & Keshwa Goundar | 10 | 4 | 1 | 5 | 149 | 172 | 9 | -23 |
| 7 | (Israel) David Kontente, David Hakak, Colin Silberstein & Haviv Takin | 10 | 4 | 1 | 5 | 135 | 186 | 9 | -51 |
| 8 | (Hong Kong) Heron Lau, Robin Chok, KK Yeung & James Keung | 10 | 4 | 0 | 6 | 157 | 180 | 8 | -23 |
| 9 | (Brunei) Yahya HJ Osman, Chuchu PM Salleh, Hitam Salleh & Lockman Salleh | 10 | 3 | 1 | 6 | 165 | 176 | 7 | -11 |
| 10 | (Guernsey) Mac Timms, Nigel Collins, Garry Collins & Gary Pitschou | 10 | 1 | 1 | 8 | 121 | 223 | 3 | -102 |
| 11 | (Thailand) Michael Liu, Dennis Mijnhijmer, Frank de Vries & Thira Maithai | 10 | 1 | 0 | 9 | 128 | 215 | 2 | -87 |

=== Section B ===
| Pos | Player | P | W | D | L | F | A | Pts | Shots |
|---|---|---|---|---|---|---|---|---|---|
| 1 | (Australia) Nathan Rice, Bill Cornehls, Wayne Turley & Mark Casey | 11 | 9 | 1 | 1 | 264 | 112 | 19 | +152 |
| 2 | (New Zealand) Andrew Todd, Richard Girvan, Russell Meyer & Gary Lawson | 11 | 11 | 0 | 0 | 238 | 135 | 22 | +103 |
| 3 | (Malaysia) Azim Azami Ariffin, Azwan Shuhaimi, M Amir M Yusof & Fairul Izwan Abd Muin | 11 | 9 | 0 | 2 | 239 | 156 | 18 | +83 |
| 4 | (South Africa) Wayne Perry, Clinton Roets, Billy Radloff & Brian Dixon | 11 | 6 | 1 | 4 | 188 | 170 | 13 | +18 |
| 5 | (Jersey) Derek Boswell, Alan Shaw, Lee Nixon & Cyril Renouf | 11 | 6 | 0 | 5 | 189 | 183 | 12 | +6 |
| 6 | (Namibia) Sandy Joubert, Julian Viljoen, Tollie Cronje & Graham Snyman | 11 | 5 | 0 | 6 | 173 | 186 | 12 | -13 |
| 7 | (Papua New Guinea) Gagina Babona, Pomat Topal, Pokatou Pomaleu & Nadu Namun | 11 | 5 | 0 | 6 | 175 | 199 | 10 | -24 |
| 8 | (Zimbabwe) Norman Gardiner, Bryan Ray, Cedric Edwards & Denis Streak | 11 | 5 | 0 | 6 | 180 | 206 | 10 | -26 |
| 9 | (Norfolk Island) Kerry Roberts, Phil Jones, Peter Walkinshaw & Jim Rawlinson | 11 | 4 | 1 | 6 | 149 | 228 | 9 | -79 |
| 10 | (Spain) Clive English, Barry Latham, Keith Jones & Mick Johnson | 11 | 3 | 2 | 6 | 166 | 190 | 8 | -24 |
| 11 | (Argentina) Jorge Barreto, Clemente Bausili, Rafael Goodliffe & Raul Pollet | 11 | 2 | 1 | 8 | 137 | 242 | 5 | -105 |
| 12 | (Cook Islands) Ioane Inatou, Tuouna Putara, Vaine Henry & Philip Tangi | 11 | 1 | 1 | 9 | 135 | 226 | 3 | -91 |

== Finals ==
Play Offs
New Zealand | 20
(Republic of Ireland) Ireland | 17
South Africa | 19
Scotland | 12
Australia | 27
Wales | 9
England | 28
Malaysia | 8

Semifinals
New Zealand | 21
South Africa | 9
Australia | 23
England | 14

Gold medal
New Zealand | 20
Australia | 10

== Results ==
Men's fours section 1
| Round 1 - Jan 20 | | |
| Ireland | Hong Kong | 18-15 |
| England | Thailand | 27-10 |
| Scotland | Fiji | 21-10 |
| Canada | Wales | 23-14 |
| Israel | Guernsey | 17-16 |
| Round 2 - Jan 20 | | |
| Scotland | Ireland | 19-17 |
| Wales | Brunei | 17-16 |
| Israel | Thailand | 13-12 |
| Hong Kong | Fiji | 19-12 |
| England | Guernsey | 14-14 |
| Round 3 - Jan 20 | | |
| Ireland | Thailand | 19-18 |
| England | Canada | 29-7 |
| Scotland | Israel | 21-15 |
| Wales | Hong Kong | 21-14 |
| Brunei | Fiji | 17-13 |
| Round 4 - Jan 21 | | |
| Ireland | Fiji | 20-15 |
| England | Israel | 22-8 |
| Scotland | Canada | 22-15 |
| Hong Kong | Guernsey | 27-11 |
| Brunei | Thailand | 27-11 |
| Round 5 - Jan 21 | | |
| Ireland | Canada | 25-6 |
| England | Hong Kong | 30-3 |
| Thailand | Wales | 14-11 |
| Fiji | Guernsey | 17-10 |
| Brunei | Israel | 19-19 |
| Round 6 - Jan 22 | | |
| England | Ireland | 21-4 |
| Scotland | Brunei | 24-17 |
| Wales | Guernsey | 40-6 |
| Canada | Thailand | 34-3 |
| Fiji | Israel | 19-11 |
| Round 7 - Jan 22 | | |
| Ireland | Brunei | 23-9 |
| Scotland | Guernsey | 22-14 |
| Israel | Canada | 14-12 |
| Hong Kong | Thailand | 22-15 |
| England | Wales | 16-16 |
| Round 8 - Jan 23 | | |
| Scotland | Thailand | 19-12 |
| Wales | Israel | 20-15 |
| Canada | Guernsey | 24-14 |
| Hong Kong | Brunei | 23-15 |
| Fiji | England | 23-15 |
| Round 9 - Jan 23 | | |
| England | Wales | 22-10 |
| Wales | Ireland | 20-11 |
| Canada | Hong Kong | 19-10 |
| Fiji | Thailand | 23-15 |
| Brunei | Guernsey | 22-9 |
| Round 10 - Jan 24 | | |
| Ireland | Guernsey | 22-7 |
| England | Brunei | 21-11 |
| Scotland | Wales | 14-13 |
| Canada | Fiji | 30-3 |
| Israel | Hong Kong | 16-12 |
| Round 11 - Jan 24 | | |
| Ireland | Israel | 33-7 |
| Scotland | Hong Kong | 24-15 |
| Canada | Brunei | 19-13 |
| Guernsey | Thailand | 20-18 |
| Fiji | Wales | 14-14 |

Men's fours section 2
| Round 1 - Jan 20 | | |
| Australia | Spain | 20-11 |
| New Zealand | Namibia | 27-11 |
| Jersey | Papua New Guinea | 23-15 |
| Zimbabwe | Argentina | 20-13 |
| Malaysia | Norfolk Island | 38-3 |
| Cook Islands | South Africa | 20-15 |
| Round 2 - Jan 20 | | |
| Australia | Zimbabwe | 21-10 |
| New Zealand | Papua New Guinea | 23-5 |
| South Africa | Norfolk Island | 16-14 |
| Namibia | Jersey | 21-20 |
| Spain | Argentina | 17-17 |
| Malaysia | Cook Islands | 15-15 |
| Round 3 - Jan 20 | | |
| Australia | Cook Islands | 29-11 |
| New Zealand | South Africa | 17-16 |
| Namibia | Spain | 22-9 |
| Jersey | Argentina | 34-11 |
| Malaysia | Zimbabwe | 31-17 |
| Papua New Guinea | Norfolk Island | 20-13 |
| Round 4 - Jan 21 | | |
| Australia | Papua New Guinea | 29-10 |
| New Zealand | Jersey | 26-11 |
| South Africa | Argentina | 17-14 |
| Spain | Zimbabwe | 16-14 |
| Malaysia | Namibia | 29-4 |
| Norfolk Island | Cook Islands | 17-16 |
| Round 5 - Jan 21 | | |
| Australia | New Zealand | 20-10 |
| Namibia | Cook Islands | 25-8 |
| Jersey | Malaysia | 16-14 |
| Spain | South Africa | 21-8 |
| Norfolk Island | Argentina | 16-10 |
| Papua New Guinea | Zimbabwe | 27-13 |
| Round 6 - Jan 22 | | |
| Australia | South Africa | 17-11 |
| New Zealand | Cook Islands | 20-7 |
| Zimbabwe | Namibia | 16-11 |
| Malaysia | Spain | 23-14 |
| Norfolk Island | Jersey | 23-6 |
| Papua New Guinea | Argentina | 26-15 |
| Round 7 - Jan 22 | | |
| Australia | Norfolk Island | 31-10 |
| New Zealand | Argentina | 32-11 |
| South Africa | Namibia | 27-11 |
| Zimbabwe | Jersey | 18-14 |
| Spain | Cook Islands | 26-7 |
| Malaysia | Papua New Guinea | 18-13 |
| Round 8 - Jan 23 | | |
| Australia | Malaysia | 20-11 |
| New Zealand | Zimbabwe | 20-13 |
| South Africa | Papua New Guinea | 20-10 |
| Jersey | Cook Islands | 15-13 |
| Argentina | Namibia | 15-11 |
| Spain | Norfolk Island | 18-18 |
| Round 9 - Jan 23 | | |
| Australia | Namibia | 21-9 |
| New Zealand | Spain | 27-6 |
| Jersey | South Africa | 20-8 |
| Zimbabwe | Norfolk Island | 26-12 |
| Malaysia | Argentina | 27-7 |
| Papua New Guinea | Cook Islands | 23-13 |
| Round 10 - Jan 24 | | |
| Australia | Jersey | 21-14 |
| New Zealand | Malaysia | 20-18 |
| South Africa | Zimbabwe | 23-11 |
| Namibia | Norfolk Island | 31-6 |
| Argentina | Cook Islands | 19-7 |
| Papua New Guinea | Spain | 18-15 |
| Round 11 - Jan 24 | | |
| Australia | Argentina | 35-5 |
| South Africa | Malaysia | 27-15 |
| Namibia | Papua New Guinea | 17-8 |
| Jersey | Spain | 16-13 |
| Zimbabwe | Cook Islands | 22-18 |
| Norfolk Island | New Zealand | 17-16 |
