= 2008 World Outdoor Bowls Championship – Men's triples =

Bowls championship held in Christchurch, New Zealand

World Outdoor Bowls Championships 2008 - men's triples
- 11th World Outdoor Bowls Championships
- Location: Christchurch, New Zealand
- Date: 12–24 January 2008.
- Category: World Bowls Championship

The 2008 World Outdoor Bowls Championship men's triples was held at the Burnside Bowling Club in Christchurch, New Zealand, from 12 to 24 January 2008.

Wayne Hogg, Willie Wood and David Peacock of Scotland won the gold medal.

== Section tables ==
=== Section A ===
Pos	Player	P	W	D	L	F	A	Pts	Shots
1	(England) Mark Walton, Stephen Farish & Graham Shadwell	10	9	0	1	236	113	18	+123
2	(Australia) Bill Cornehls, Wayne Turley & Mark Casey	10	8	1	1	237	120	17	+117
3	(Scotland) Wayne Hogg, Willie Wood & David Peacock	10	7	0	3	219	128	14	+91
4	(Malaysia) Azim Azami Ariffin, Azwan Shuhaimi & Mohd Amir Mohd Yusof	10	7	0	3	196	133	14	+63
5	(Hong Kong) Ken Chan, KK Yeung & James Keung	10	5	0	5	162	185	10	-23
6	(South Africa) Clinton Roets, Billy Radloff & Brian Dixon	10	4	0	6	151	187	8	-36
7	(Wales) Neil Rees, Mike Prosser & Andrew Atwood	10	3	1	6	151	191	7	-40
8	(Guernsey) Nigel Collins, Garry Collins & Gary Pitschou	10	3	1	6	149	193	7	-44
9	(Namibia) Julian Viljoen, Tollie Cronje & Douw Calitz	10	2	2	6	163	162	6	+1
10	(Cook Islands) Ioane Inatou, Tuouna Putara & Philip Tangi	10	3	0	7	108	250	6	-142
11	(Papua New Guinea) Gagina Babon, Pokatou Pomaleu & Nadu Namun	10	1	1	8	119	229	3	-110

=== Section B ===
Pos	Player	P	W	D	L	F	A	Pts	Shots
1	(Republic of Ireland) Jonathan Ross, Jeremy Henry & Neil Booth	11	9	1	1	230	126	19	+104
2	(New Zealand) Andrew Todd, Richard Girvan & Ali Forsyth	11	9	0	2	243	127	18	+116
3	(Fiji) Samuela Tuikiligana, Curtis Mar & Keshwa Goundar	11	9	0	2	188	130	18	+58
4	(Canada) Keith Roney, Chris Stadnyk & Hiren Bhartu	11	7	1	3	218	153	15	+65
5	(Spain) Clive English, Keith Jones & Mick Johnson	11	6	3	2	224	163	15	+61
6	(Zimbabwe) Norman Gardiner, Cedric Edwards & Denis Streak	11	5	1	5	181	189	11	-8
7	(Brunei) Yahya HJ Osman, Chuchu PM Salleh & Hitam Salleh	11	5	0	6	176	193	10	-17
8	(Israel) David Kontente, Colin Silberstein & Haviv Takin	11	5	0	6	177	208	10	-31
9	(Jersey) Derek Boswell, Alan Shaw & Cyril Renouf	11	3	0	8	166	182	6	-16
10	(Thailand) Dennis Mijnhijmer, Frank de Vries & Surasek Phonghanyudh	11	3	0	8	164	201	6	-37
11	(Norfolk Island) Kerry Roberts, Peter Walkinshaw & Jim Rawlinson	11	1	0	10	110	253	2	-143
12	(Argentina) Jorge Barreto, Juan Garcia Cabello & Raul Pollet	11	1	0	101	110	262	2	-152

== Finals ==
Play Offs
Scotland	22
(Fiji) New Zealand	14
Canada	20
England	14
Fiji	19
Australia	14
Malaysia	15
(Republic of Ireland) Ireland	13

Semifinals
Scotland	26
Canada	11
Fiji	24
Malaysia	17

Gold medal
Scotland	16
Fiji	14

== Results ==
Men's triples section 1
Round 1 - Jan 12		
Scotland	Cook Islands	30-6
England	Papua New Guinea	26-6
Australia	Malaysia	21-12
Wales	Guernsey	30-11
Hong Kong	South Africa	21-14
Round 2 - Jan 12		
Scotland	South Africa	22-11
England	Australia	21-15
Namibia	Guernsey	18-18
Malaysia	Papua New Guinea	33-6
Hong Kong	Cook Islands	41-4
Round 3 - Jan 13		
Scotland	Hong Kong	23-10
South Africa	Guernsey	15-11
Namibia	Wales	20-8
Malaysia	England	24-7
Cook Islands	Papua New Guinea	15-12
Round 4 - Jan 13		
England	South Africa	24-10
Australia	Scotland	21-10
Wales	Cook Islands	20-10
Malaysia	Guernsey	17-12
Papua New Guinea	Namibia	17-16
Round 5 - Jan 13		
Scotland	Papua New Guinea	44-3
England	Cook Islands	37-6
Wales	South Africa	17-15
Namibia	Australia	17-17
Hong Kong	Guernsey	21-15
Round 6 - Jan 14		
Scotland	Malaysia	26-8
England	Hong Kong	24-8
Australia	Guernsey	28-8
Cook Islands	Namibia	15-14
Wales	Papua New Guinea	16-16
Round 7 - Jan 14		
England	Scotland	28-7
South Africa	Cook Islands	23-13
Australia	Papua New Guinea	24-10
Malaysia	Namibia	18-14
Hong Kong	Wales	19-14
Round 8 - Jan 15		
Scotland	Namibia	25-12
England	Wales	33-10
Australia	South Africa	20-14
Guernsey	Papua New Guinea	18-14
Malaysia	Hong Kong	24-5
Round 9 - Jan 15		
Scotland	Wales	16-12
England	Namibia	16-12
Australia	Wales	27-12
Guernsey	Cook Islands	24-14
Malaysia	South Africa	22-10
Round 10 - Jan 16		
South Africa	Namibia	19-18
Australia	Wales	27-12
Guernsey	Scotland	17-16
Hong Kong	Papua New Guinea	17-16
Cook Islands	Malaysia	20-14
Round 11 - Jan 16		
England	Guernsey	20-15
South Africa	Papua New Guinea	20-19
Australia	Cook Islands	35-5
Namibia	Hong Kong	22-9
Malaysia	Wales	24-12

Men's triples section 2
Round 1 - Jan 12		
New Zealand	Thailand	20-14
Ireland	Norfolk Island	37-5
Zimbabwe	Brunei	24-11
Canada	Argentina	38-2
Spain	Israel	27-14
Fiji	Jersey	20-12
Round 2 - Jan 12		
New Zealand	Zimbabwe	32-7
Ireland	Jersey	19-15
Israel	Argentina	27-18
Fiji	Norfolk Island	12-11
Brunei	Thailand	17-9
Canada	Spain	19-19
Round 3 - Jan 13		
New Zealand	Brunei	26-8
Ireland	Fiji	12-9
Jersey	Argentina	22-9
Canada	Israel	25-17
Spain	Zimbabwe	20-20
Thailand	Norfolk Island	26-9
Round 4 - Jan 13		
New Zealand	Jersey	17-11
Ireland	Zimbabwe	22-16
Israel	Thailand	16-15
Canada	Norfolk Island	19-8
Argentina	Brunei	18-15
Fiji	Spain	26-10
Round 5 - Jan 13		
New Zealand	Norfolk Island	26-7
Ireland	Thailand	24-9
Israel	Zimbabwe	15-14
Canada	Jersey	21-9
Spain	Brunei	17-15
Fiji	Argentina	18-11
Round 6 - Jan 14		
Ireland	Brunei	23-19
Zimbabwe	Argentina	15-11
Israel	Norfolk Island	21-12
Canada	Thailand	28-15
Spain	Jersey	20-12
Fiji	New Zealand	12-10
Round 7 - Jan 14		
New Zealand	Ireland	17-9
Zimbabwe	Thailand	20-13
Jersey	Norfolk Island	29-11
Canada	Fiji	17-13
Spain	Argentina	28-6
Brunei	Israel	18-16
Round 8 - Jan 15		
New Zealand	Canada	18-15
Ireland	Israel	19-10
Zimbabwe	Jersey	16-11
Spain	Norfolk Island	34-2
Fiji	Brunei	24-15
Thailand	Argentina	23-12
Round 9 - Jan 15		
New Zealand	Israel	33-14
Ireland	Canada	20-9
Fiji	Zimbabwe	20-16
Brunei	Jersey	17-15
Norfolk Island	Argentina	17-7
Thailand	Spain	19-18
Round 10 - Jan 16		
Ireland	Argentina	33-5
Israel	Jersey	18-12
Canada	Zimbabwe	19-16
Spain	New Zealand	19-18
Fiji	Thailand	19-7
Brunei	Norfolk Island	25-13
Round 11 - Jan 16		
New Zealand	Argentina	26-11
Zimbabwe	Norfolk Island	17-15
Jersey	Thailand	18-14
Spain	Ireland	12-12
Fiji	Israel	15-9
Brunei	Canada	16-8
