= Lawn bowls at the 2010 Commonwealth Games – Men's triples =

Bowls event

The men's triples competition began on 4 October 2010. and finished on 10 October 2010. The gold medal was won by South Africa who won the final over Australia after a tie-break. The bronze medal was won by England, who only lost one match all tournament.

== Results ==
=== Qualifying – round robin ===
==== Section A ====
Team	Players	P	W	L	F	A	Pts	Set Diff
South Africa	Johann Pierre du Plessis, Wayne Perry, Gidion Vermeulen	10	8	2	192	117	16	+6
Australia	Brett Wilkie, Wayne Turley, Mark Casey	10	7	3	215	111	14	+13
Wales	Chris Blake, Andrew Fleming, Marc Wyatt	10	7	3	177	153	14	+4
Scotland	Wayne Hogg, David Peacock, Willie Wood	10	7	3	172	137	14	+1
New Zealand	Shannon McIlroy, Richard Girvan, Andrew Todd	10	6	4	180	120	12	+7
Canada	Hiren Bhartu, Steve McKerihen, Fred Wallbank	10	5	5	165	156	10	+1
Namibia	Willem Esterhuizen, Steven Peake, Graham Snyman	10	5	5	143	174	10	–4
Brunei	Yakup Amit, Md Ali Bujang, Haji Haji Ibrahim	10	4	6	136	199	8	–5
India	Sunil Bahadur, Dinesh Kumar, Prince Mahto, Mahip Tirkey	10	3	7	161	164	6	–1
Malta	Leonard Callus, Michael Debono, Joseph Saragozza	10	2	8	134	187	4	–8
Niue	Vihekula Kanaihu, Ian McKenna, Kolonisi Polima	10	1	9	88	245	2	–20

==== Section B ====
Team	Players	P	W	L	F	A	Pts	Set Diff
England	Mark Bantock, Robert Newman & Graham Shadwell	9	9	0	187	115	18	+14
Malaysia	Mohd Amir Mohd Yusof, Syed Mohamad Syed Akil, Azim Azami Ariffin	9	8	1	189	92	16	+10
Guernsey	Garry Collins, Dan De la Mare, Gary Pitschou	9	6	3	155	124	12	+6
Northern Ireland	Paul Daly, Martin McHugh, Neil Booth	9	6	3	179	128	12	+9
Kenya	Michael Bedan, Ngugi Njuguna, Martin Nyaga	9	5	4	130	167	10	–2
Norfolk Island	John Christian, Tim Sheridan, Bazza Wilson	9	3	6	136	151	6	–7
Botswana	Boitumelo Mosinyi, Gabatladiwe Motshidisi, Kitso Robert	9	2	7	136	162	4	–2
Cook Islands	Vaine Henry, Ioane Ina Tou, Denis Tokorangi	9	2	7	118	169	4	–7
Jersey	Derek Boswell, Allan Quemard, Cyril Renouf	9	2	7	132	175	4	–8
Papua New Guinea	Harry Kaisa, Lucas Roika, Soling Tiba	9	2	7	106	185	4	–8

Jersey won 5 sets with a shot difference of -43 to finish ahead of Papua New Guinea who won 5 sets with a shot difference of -79.

=== Knockout stages ===
Quarterfinals
A1	South Africa
Bye
B3	Guernsey	6	3
A3	Wales	8	12
B1	England
Bye
B2	Malaysia	1	8
A2	Australia	14	10

Semifinals
A1	South Africa	10	11
A3	Wales	7	9
B1	England	3	7	4
A2	Australia	11	5	5

Gold Medal Match
A1	South Africa	9	4	4
A2	Australia	6	8	3
Third place
A3	Wales	6	4
B1	England	8	9

== See also ==
- Lawn bowls at the 2010 Commonwealth Games
