= 2012 World Outdoor Bowls Championship – Women's triples =

Lawn bowls event

World Outdoor Championships 2012 women's triples
- 12th World Outdoor Bowls Championships
- Location: Adelaide, Australia
- Date(s): 24 November - 9 December 2012.
- Category: 2012 World Outdoor Bowls Championship

The 2012 World Outdoor Bowls Championship women's triples was held at the Lockleys Bowling Club in Adelaide, Australia. Some of the qualifying rounds were held at the nearby Holdfast Bowling Club in Glenelg North.

Karen Murphy, Lynsey Armitage and Natasha Van Eldik won the women's triples Gold.

== Section tables ==
=== Pool 1 ===
Pos	Player	P	W	D	F	A	L	Pts	Shots
1	(Scotland) Lynn Stein, Caroline Brown & Michelle Cooper	11	10	0	1	209	108	20	+101
2	(Wales) Kathy Pearce, Caroline Taylor & Lisa Forey	11	9	1	1	196	127	19	+69
3	(South Africa) Susan Nel, Santjie Steyn & Esme Steyn	11	9	0	2	204	123	18	+81
4	(Canada) Kelly McKerihen, Laura Hudson, Laura Seed	11	7	0	4	158	145	14	+13
5	(Philippines) Rosita Bradborn, Sonia Bruce, Hazel Jagonoy	11	5	1	5	145	142	11	+3
6	(Israel) Irit Grenchel, Edna Zomberg, Tami Kamzel	11	5	1	5	150	170	11	-20
7	(Jersey) Doreen Moon, Joan Renouf, Suzie Dingle	11	5	0	6	165	163	10	+2
8	(Fiji) Litia Tikoisuva, Doreen O'Connor, Sheryl Mar	11	4	1	6	168	163	9	+5
9	(Cyprus) Gill Ford, Diane Roberts, Dorothy Gibbons	11	4	0	7	133	176	8	-43
10	(Japan) Yoka Goda, Hiroko Emura, Hiroko Mori	11	3	0	8	123	177	6	-54
11	(Botswana) Obopile Mosimanyana, Tobone Fox, Lillian Tebele	11	2	0	9	135	193	4	-58
12	(China) Chen Yan Fen, Yattie So, Susanna Shea	11	1	0	10	109	208	2	-99

=== Pool 2 ===
Pos	Player	P	W	D	L	F	A	Pts	Shots
1	(Australia) Karen Murphy, Lynsey Armitage & Natasha Van Eldik	11	10	0	1	209	103	20	+106
2	(Hong Kong) Alice Lee, Jessie So & Tammy Tham	11	9	0	2	195	134	18	+61
3	(New Zealand) Mandy Boyd, Jan Khan & Lisa White	11	8	1	2	206	99	17	+107
4	(England) Natalie Melmore, Sian Gordon & Jamie-Lea Winch	11	8	0	3	202	120	16	+82
5	(Malaysia) Auni Fathiah Kamis, Zuraini Khalid & Azlina Arshad	11	6	2	3	165	145	14	+20
6	(Thailand) Thong Oomen, Kesanee Wongssopa, Orawan Sodok	11	4	1	6	143	153	9	-10
7	(Spain) Sheri Fletcher, Janet Dando, Deborah Colquhoun	11	4	1	6	147	158	9	-11
8	(Netherlands) Elly Dolieslager, Norma Duin, Corrie Windle	11	4	0	7	128	193	8	-65
9	(Republic of Ireland) Ashleigh Rainey, Noeleen Kelly & Sarah-Jane Coleman	11	3	1	7	127	201	7	-74
10	(Norfolk Island) Trudy Davis, Kate Smith & Kitha Bailey	11	3	0	8	109	202	6	-93
11	(United States) Ngamarama Ben, Tereapii Urlich & Agnes Winchester	11	2	1	8	140	170	5	-30
12	(Brunei) Muntiol Ajijah, Jamal Nafsiah, Munttol Isah	11	1	1	9	101	194	3	-93

== Finals ==
Play Offs
Australia
bye
South Africa	11
Wales	12
Scotland
bye
New Zealand	16
Hong Kong	6

Semifinals
Australia	18
Wales	6
New Zealand	15
Scotland	10

Gold medal
Australia	21
New Zealand	9

== Results ==
Women's triples section 1
Round 1 – Nov 24		
South Africa	Wales	30–5
Scotland	Jersey	18–5
Philippines	Canada	16–10
Israel	Cyprus	23–14
Fiji	China	22–10
Japan	Botswana	16–12
Round 2 – Nov 24		
Scotland	South Africa	16–15
Botswana	China	15–11
Fiji	Japan	15–13
Philippines	Israel	11–11
Canada	Cyprus	17–15
Wales	Jersey	22–12
Round 3 – Nov 25		
Jersey	Japan	26–4
Cyprus	Botswana	17–13
South Africa	Philippines	19–7
Wales	Canada	18–7
Scotland	China	21–8
Israel	Fiji	14–7
Round 4 – Nov 25		
Canada	Botswana	15–12
Wales	Cyprus	18–7
South Africa	Israel	25–11
Scotland	Fiji	20–11
Japan	Philippines	12–11
Jersey	Cyprus	18–10
Round 5 – Nov 25		
Scotland	Cyprus	23–7
South Africa	Fiji	16–14
Jersey	Israel	19–13
Botswana	Philippines	17–12
Canada	Japan	15–12
Wales	China	33–5
Round 6 – Nov 26		
Wales	Botswana	16–11
China	Israel	15–13
Fiji	Cyprus	26–8
Scotland	Philippines	13–11
Canada	Jersey	18–11
South Africa	Japan	15–9
Round 7 – Nov 26		
Israel	Canada	15–7
Jersey	Fiji	16–10
Scotland	Japan	16–10
South Africa	Botswana	24–10
Wales	Philippines	11–11
Cyprus	China	18–10
Round 8 – Nov 27		
Philippines	China	21–11
Canada	South Africa	17–12
Wales	Scotland	12–9
Israel	Japan	15–12
Cyprus	Jersey	15–10
Fiji	Botswana	27–11
Round 9 – Nov 27		
Philippines	Fiji	16–16
Wales	Japan	26–9
Canada	China	15–7
Scotland	Israel	31–8
Jersey	Botswana	20–18
South Africa	Cyprus	13–7
Round 10 – Nov 28		
Philippines	Jersey	17–12
Wales	Fiji	14–13
Scotland	Canada	21–12
South Africa	China	17–11
Israel	Botswana	14–8
Cyprus	Japan	15–11
Round 11 – Nov 28		
Philippines	Cyprus	12–10
Japan	China	15–11
Wales	Israel	21–13
Scotland	Botswana	21–8
South Africa	Jersey	18–16
Canada	Fiji	25–6

Women's triples section 2
Round 1 – Nov 24		
Norfolk Island	United States	17–15
England	Ireland	26–6
Australia	New Zealand	16–10
Netherlands	Spain	16–15
Thailand	Brunei	18–9
Hong Kong	Malaysia	20–13
Round 2 – Nov 24		
United States	Brunei	11–9
Australia	Malaysia	19–9
Thailand	Norfolk Island	18–8
England	Netherlands	24–10
Ireland	Spain	15–15
Hong Kong	New Zealand	14–12
Round 3 – Nov 25		
New Zealand	Ireland	17–5
Malaysia	Brunei	12–12
Netherlands	Thailand	16–8
Hong Kong	Norfolk Island	25–6
United States	Spain	34–2
England	Australia	16–11
Round 4 – Nov 25		
Australia	Netherlands	16–9
England	Norfolk Island	24–9
Hong Kong	Brunei	16–13
Malaysia	Thailand	16–11
Ireland	United States	18–16
New Zealand	Spain	14–8
Round 5 – Nov 25		
England	United States	21–7
Ireland	Norfolk Island	14–12
New Zealand	Brunei	23–6
Australia	Thailand	14–9
Hong Kong	Netherlands	24–9
Spain	Malaysia	16–13
Round 6 – Nov 26		
Malaysia	England	14–12
Netherlands	Brunei	15–12
Thailand	Spain	15–13
New Zealand	United States	20–8
Hong Kong	Ireland	21–5
Australia	Norfolk Island	19–8
Round 7 – Nov 26		
Ireland	Netherlands	16–11
Hong Kong	Thailand	18–13
Malaysia	Norfolk Island	20–4
Australia	United States	15–6
New Zealand	England	22–5
Spain	Brunei	15–6
Round 8 – Nov 27		
Norfolk Island	Netherlands	16–7
Hong Kong	Spain	13–12
Thailand	United States	11–11
England	Brunei	26–5
Australia	Ireland	30–10
New Zealand	Malaysia	14–14
Round 9 – Nov 27		
Malaysia	Netherlands	18–12
Brunei	Ireland	18–14
Australia	Spain	17–11
England	Thailand	18–13
New Zealand	Norfolk Island	25–7
Hong Kong	United States	22–6
Round 10 – Nov 28		
Malaysia	Ireland	20–12
New Zealand	Thailand	18–12
England	Hong Kong	22–9
Australia	Brunei	29–2
Netherlands	United States	19–13
Spain	Norfolk Island	26–7
Round 11 – Nov 28		
Spain	England	14–8
New Zealand	Netherlands	31–4
Norfolk Island	Brunei	15–9
Malaysia	United States	16–13
Australia	Hong Kong	23–13
Thailand	Ireland	15–12
