= 2012 World Outdoor Bowls Championship – Women's fours =

Lawn bowls event

World Outdoor Championships 2012 women's fours
- 12th World Outdoor Bowls Championships
- Location: Adelaide, Australia
- Date(s): 24 November – 9 December 2012.
- Category: 2012 World Outdoor Bowls Championship

The 2012 World Outdoor Bowls Championship women's fours was held at the Lockleys Bowling Club in Adelaide, Australia. Some of the qualifying Rounds were held at the nearby Holdfast Bowling Club in Glenelg North.

Margaret Letham, Caroline Brown, Lynn Stein and Michelle Cooper won the women's fours Gold.

== Section tables ==
=== Pool 1 ===
Pos	Player	P	W	D	F	A	L	Pts	Shots
1	(Scotland) Margaret Letham, Caroline Brown, Lynn Stein & Michelle Cooper	11	10	1	0	267	105	21	+162
2	(Malaysia) Auni Fathiah Kamis, Nur Fidrah Noh, Zuraini Khalid & Azlina Arshad	11	10	0	1	246	147	20	+99
3	(Philippines) Rosita Bradborn, Ainie Knight, Sonia Bruce & Hazel Jagonoy	11	8	0	3	247	158	16	+89
4	(New Zealand) Jo Edwards, Mandy Boyd, Jan Khan, Lisa White	11	7	1	3	218	141	15	+77
5	(Australia) Rebecca Quail, Kelsey Cottrell, Natasha Van Eldik, Lynsey Armitage	11	6	1	4	216	161	13	+55
6	(Israel) Tami Kamzel, Edna Zomberg, Irit Grenchel, Beverly Polatinsky	11	4	1	6	181	192	9	-11
7	(Brunei) Hj Mohd Rosita, Muntiol Ajijah, Jamal Nafsiah, Munttol Isah	11	4	1	6	168	231	9	-63
8	(Spain) Sheri Fletcher, Janet Dando, Margaret Lawley, Deborah Colquhoun	11	4	0	7	171	201	8	-30
9	(Botswana) Obopile Mosimanyyana, Tirelo Buckley, Tobone Fox, Lillian Tebele	11	4	0	7	152	211	8	-59
10	(Canada) Marg Lepere, Laura Hudson, Laura Seed, Jackie Foster	11	3	0	9	142	230	6	-88
11	(Thailand) Thong Oomen, Kesanee Wongssopa, Orawan Sodok, Chamaipom Kotchawong	11	2	1	8	135	237	5	-102
12	(Japan) Nanami Yoshimoto, Masako Satoh, Hiroko Emura, Hiroko Mori	11	1	0	10	142	271	2	-129

=== Pool 2 ===
Pos	Player	P	W	D	F	A	L	Pts	Shots
1	(Wales) Anwen Butten, Kathy Pearce, Hannah Smith & Lisa Forey	11	11	0	0	230	152	22	+78
2	(England) Ellen Falkner, Sian Gordon, Wendy King & Jamie-Lea Winch	11	9	0	2	222	131	18	+91
3	(South Africa) Colleen Piketh, Susan Nel, Santjie Steyn & Esme Steyn	11	7	1	3	216	125	15	+91
4	(Fiji) Sheryl Mar, Doreen O'Connor, Salanieta Gukivuli & Litia Tikoisuva	11	6	1	4	183	150	13	+33
5	(Netherlands) Elly Dolieslager, Norma Duin, Corrie Windle & Ineke Nagtegaal	11	6	0	5	194	189	12	+5
6	(United States) Anne Nunes, Eva Lee, Janice Bell & Myra Wood	11	5	1	5	160	178	11	-18
7	(Cyprus) Sol Robertson, Diane Roberts, Gill Ford & Linda Ryan	11	5	0	6	189	178	10	+11
8	(Jersey) Christine Grimes, Doreen Moon, Joan Renouf & Suzie Dingle	11	5	0	6	168	205	10	-37
9	(Republic of Ireland) Ashleigh Rainey, Noeleen Kelly, Paula Montgomery & Sarah-Jane Coleman	11	4	1	6	193	182	9	+11
10	(Hong Kong) Jessie So, Alice Lee, Joanna Nam & Camilla Leung	11	4	0	7	174	190	8	-16
11	(Norfolk Island) Tess Evans, Trudy Davis, Kate Smith & Kitha Bailey	11	1	0	10	137	234	2	-97
12	(China) Susanna Shea, May Poon, Yettie So & Chen Fan Yen	11	1	0	10	115	267	2	-152

== Finals ==
Play Offs
Wales
bye
Malaysia	18
Philippines	17
Scotland
bye
South Africa	24
England	19

Semifinals
Wales	14
Malaysia	15
Scotland	19
South Africa	6

Gold medal
Malaysia	15
Scotland	18

== Results ==
Women's fours section 1
Round 1 – Nov 29		
Malaysia	Australia	20–9
New Zealand	Scotland	14–14
Philippines	Canada	23–5
Spain	Israel	17–11
Brunei	Japan	23–11
Thailand	Botswana	18–15
Round 2 – Nov 29		
Botswana	Japan	16–14
Canada	Israel	21–16
Scotland	Malaysia	20–11
Philippines	Spain	30–10
New Zealand	Australia	22–14
Brunei	Thailand	18–18
Round 3 – Nov 30		
Scotland	Thailand	30–6
Israel	Brunei	22–11
Australia	Philippines	23–13
Malaysia	Canada	28–16
New Zealand	Japan	30–13
Brunei	Spain	23–14
Round 4 – Nov 30		
Botswana	Canada	24–7
Philippines	Thailand	23–14
Scotland	Japan	38–9
Malaysia	Israel	25–13
Australia	Spain	24–11
New Zealand	Brunei	25–13
Round 5 – Nov 30		
New Zealand	Israel	19–12
Brunei	Australia	16–15
Scotland	Spain	20–9
Philippines	Botswana	22–8
Canada	Thailand	15–11
Malaysia	Japan	34–15
Round 6 – Dec 1		
Malaysia	Botswana	20–16
Spain	Japan	22–16
Israel	Brunei	21–18
Philippines	New Zealand	21–14
Scotland	Canada	25–10
Australia	Thailand	31–8
Round 7 – Dec 1		
Australia	Botswana	28–11
Malaysia	Philippines	21–17
Israel	Japan	29–4
Spain	Canada	19–11
Scotland	Brunei	27–12
New Zealand	Thailand	28–5
Round 8 – Dec 2		
Philippines	Japan	22–19
Australia	Canada	26–14
Malaysia	New Zealand	12–11
Thailand	Spain	19–15
Scotland	Israel	29–7
Botswana	Brunei	19–10
Round 9 – Dec 2		
New Zealand	Spain	16–14
Scotland	Botswana	26–9
Australia	Israel	16–16
Philippines	Brunei	39–9
Malaysia	Thailand	26–15
Canada	Japan	19–12
Round 10 – Dec 3		
Scotland	Philippines	18–13
Spain	Botswana	30–8
Israel	Thailand	17–8
New Zealand	Canada	25–8
Malaysia	Brunei	26–5
Australia	Japan	25–10
Round 11 – Dec 3		
Philippines	Israel	24–17
Japan	Thailand	19–13
Malaysia	Spain	23–10
Brunei	Canada	21–16
Botswana	New Zealand	15–14
Scotland	Australia	20–5

Women's fours section 2
Round 1 – Nov 29		
Netherlands	Cyprus	18–17
Fiji	Norfolk Island	24–7
Wales	Ireland	21–15
England	South Africa	13–11
United States	China	19–14
Hong Kong	Jersey	27–7
Round 2 – Nov 29		
United States	Norfolk Island	17–13
Wales	England	18–15
Fiji	China	30–9
Cyprus	Hong Kong	22–12
Netherlands	Jersey	26–17
South Africa	Ireland	20–13
Round 3 – Nov 30		
South Africa	China	28–9
United States	Netherlands	21–10
Wales	Hong Kong	24–12
Jersey	Ireland	18–11
England	Norfolk Island	33–10
Fiji	Cyprus	16–11
Round 4 – Nov 30		
Jersey	United States	24–10
China	Hong Kong	14–13
South Africa	Norfolk Island	28–7
England	Fiji	17–11
Ireland	Netherlands	22–18
Wales	Cyprus	25–17
Round 5 – Nov 30		
Netherlands	England	23–8
Wales	Fiji	22–12
Cyprus	South Africa	18–15
United States	Hong Kong	18–12
Jersey	China	27–10
Ireland	Norfolk Island	19–13
Round 6 – Dec 1		
Ireland	United States	16–16
South Africa	Jersey	32–10
Wales	China	25–11
England	Hong Kong	22–13
Cyprus	Norfolk Island	25–10
Fiji	Netherlands	22–9
Round 7 – Dec 1		
Cyprus	Jersey	20–16
South Africa	Fiji	13–13
England	China	31–7
Wales	United States	19–15
Hong Kong	Ireland	17–15
Netherlands	Norfolk Island	22–16
Round 8 – Dec 2		
Hong Kong	Norfolk Island	19–9
Wales	Jersey	21–10
England	Ireland	23–12
Cyprus	China	24–7
South Africa	Netherlands	13–11
Fiji	United States	15–10
Round 9 – Dec 2		
England	Cyprus	16–9
South Africa	United States	21–8
Wales	Netherlands	20–16
Hong Kong	Fiji	23–13
Ireland	China	30–8
Jersey	Norfolk Island	16–13
Round 10 – Dec 3		
South Africa	Hong Kong	22–9
Fiji	Ireland	16–15
England	Jersey	24–9
Wales	Norfolk Island	21–16
United States	Cyprus	18–14
Netherlands	China	17–16
Round 11 – Dec 3		
England	United States	20–8
Netherlands	Hong Kong	24–17
Jersey	Fiji	14–11
Wales	South Africa	14–13
Norfolk Island	China	23–10
Ireland	Cyprus	25–12
