= Lawn bowls at the 2010 Commonwealth Games – Men's pairs =

Bowls event

The men's pairs competition began on 4 October 2010. and finished on 11 October 2010. Shaun Addinall and Gerry Baker of South Africa won the gold medal, defeating England's Stuart Airey and Mervyn King in the final. Khairul Annuar Abdul Kadir and Fairul Izwan Abd Muin from Malaysia won the bronze medal.

== Results ==
=== Qualifying ===
==== Section A ====
Team	Players	Played	Won	Lost	F	A	Pts	Set Diff
South Africa	Shaun Addinall & Gerry Baker	11	10	1	222	130	20	+13
Australia	Mark Berghofer & Aron Sherriff	11	10	1	271	121	20	+12
Scotland	Darren Burnett & Neil Speirs	11	8	3	223	120	16	+10
Northern Ireland	Gary McCloy & Ian McClure	11	8	3	196	169	16	+3
Canada	Michel Larue & Keith Roney	11	7	4	207	152	14	+5
Brunei	Haji Naim Brahim & Abdul Rahman bin Haji Omar	11	6	5	196	168	12	0
Papua New Guinea	Reuben Soten & Anthony Yogio	11	5	6	170	168	10	–4
Cook Islands	Tupou Maihia & Kairua Takai	11	4	7	159	221	8	–1
Kenya	Eric Langton & Michael Sewe	11	3	8	146	234	6	–6
Swaziland	Graham Byars & Hannes Nienaber	11	3	8	118	241	6	–9
Botswana	Phemelo Kebapetse & Oabona Motladiile	11	2	9	150	251	4	–10
Niue	John Kumitau & Motufoli Vakaheketaha	11	0	11	141	224	0	–13

==== Section B ====
Team	Players	Played	Won	Lost	F	A	Pts	Set Diff
Malaysia	Khairul Annuar Abdul Kadir & Fairul Izwan Abd Muin	11	9	2	243	113	18	+15
Jersey	Malcolm De Sousa & John Lowery	11	9	2	218	152	18	+9
England	Stuart Airey & Mervyn King	11	8	3	220	127	16	+9
Wales	Jason Greenslade & Martin Selway	11	8	3	201	142	16	+9
Malta	Brendan Aquilina & Francis Vella	11	6	5	205	164	12	+8
New Zealand	Richard Collett & Dan Delany	11	6	5	229	170	12	–1
India	Dinesh Kumar & Prince Mahto	11	6	5	172	193	12	–4
Malawi	Laurence Arthur & Julian Arthur	11	4	7	173	207	8	–4
Guernsey	Don Batiste & Ian Merrien	11	4	7	149	207	8	–7
Samoa	Edward Bell & Petelo Gabriel	11	3	8	161	196	6	–6
Namibia	Willem Esterhuizen & Jean Viljoen	11	2	9	92	323	4	–17
Falkland Islands	George Paice & Gerald Reive	11	1	10	160	229	2	–11

=== Knockout stages ===
Quarterfinals
A1	South Africa
Bye
A3	Scotland	9	2	2
B2	Jersey	6	10	1
B1	Malaysia
Bye
B3	England	12	10
A2	Australia	4	5

Semifinals
A1	South Africa	10	6	4
A3	Scotland	8	7	1
B1	Malaysia	8	4
B3	England	9	8

Gold Medal Match
A1	South Africa	8	13
B3	England	7	13
Bronze Medal Match
A3	Scotland	1	14	1
B1	Malaysia	15	4	5

== See also ==
- Lawn bowls at the 2010 Commonwealth Games
