= 2008 World Outdoor Bowls Championship – Men's pairs =

Bowls championship held in Christchurch, New Zealand

World Outdoor Bowls Championships 2008 - men's pairs
- 11th World Outdoor Bowls Championships
- Location: Christchurch, New Zealand
- Date: 12–24 January 2008.
- Category: World Bowls Championship

The 2008 World Outdoor Bowls Championship men's pairs was held at the Burnside Bowling Club in Christchurch, New Zealand, from 12 to 24 January 2008.

Russell Meyer and Gary Lawson of New Zealand won the gold medal.

+ Bizarrely there is confusion as to the actual Brunei team that competed. Although HJ Brahim Naim is listed as competing in the singles & pairs he publicly announced that he was not there after missing his flight.

== Section tables ==
=== Section A ===
Pos	Player	P	W	D	L	F	A	Pts	Shots
1	(Scotland) Darren Burnett & Billy Mellors	10	9	0	1	247	119	18	+128
2	(England) Mark Bantock & Robert Newman	10	9	0	1	212	106	18	+106
3	(Canada) Mark Sandford & Ryan Bester	10	8	0	2	206	119	16	+87
4	(South Africa) Gerry Baker & Wayne Perry	10	6	0	4	195	147	12	+48
5	(Hong Kong) Heron Lau & Robin Chok	10	6	0	4	155	169	12	-14
6	(Papua New Guinea) Peter Juni & Pomat Topal	10	4	0	6	156	179	8	-23
7	(Norfolk Island) Neil Tall & Phil Jones	10	4	0	6	140	196	8	-56
8	(Cook Islands) Vaine Henry & Munokoa Totoo	10	3	0	7	145	197	6	-52
9	(Israel) David Hakak & Danny Keet	10	2	0	8	138	195	4	-57
10	(Wales) Martin Selway & Robert Horgan	10	2	0	8	129	203	4	-74
11	(Guernsey) Mac Timms & Ian Merrien	10	2	0	8	120	213	4	-93

=== Section B ===
Pos	Player	P	W	D	L	F	A	Pts	Shots
1	(New Zealand) Russell Meyer & Gary Lawson	11	10	0	1	258	120	20	+138
2	(Malaysia) Safuan Said & Fairul Izwan Abd Muin	11	10	0	1	251	145	20	+106
3	(Australia) Aron Sherriff & Nathan Rice	11	8	0	3	241	129	16	+112
4	(Fiji) Arun Kumar & Ratish Lal	11	8	0	3	221	146	16	+75
5	(Namibia) Sandy Joubert & Graham Snyman	11	6	0	5	192	173	12	+19
6	(Zimbabwe) Roy Garden & Bryan Ray	11	5	1	5	185	191	11	-6
7	(Republic of Ireland) Jim Baker & Martin McHugh	11	5	0	6	161	164	10	-3
8	(Jersey) Jamie Macdonald & Lee Nixon	11	3	1	7	176	199	7	-23
9	(Brunei) Haji J Brahim Naim+ & Lockman Salleh	11	3	0	8	182	214	6	-32
10	(Spain) Nick Cole & Barry Latham	11	3	0	8	166	208	6	-42
11	(Argentina) Clemente Bausili & Rafael Goodliffe	11	2	0	9	121	270	4	-149
12	(Thailand) Michael Liu & Thira Maithai	11	2	0	9	127	322	4	-195

== Finals ==
Play Offs
Scotland	20
Fiji	9
Malaysia	20
Canada	8
New Zealand	19
South Africa	14
Australia	20
England	10

Semifinals
Scotland	17
Malaysia	16
New Zealand	19
Australia	12

Gold medal
Scotland	13
New Zealand	18

== Results ==
men's pairs Section 1
Round 1 - Jan 12		
Wales	Cook Islands	22-8
Scotland	Guernsey	37-10
England	South Africa	16-15
Papua New Guinea	Hong Kong	22-11
Norfolk Island	Israel	20-12
Round 2 - Jan 12		
Canada	Papua New Guinea	25-13
South Africa	Wales	20-14
England	Israel	35-5
Hong Kong	Guernsey	15-13
Norfolk Island	Cook Islands	20-17
Round 3 - Jan 13		
Canada	Guernsey	21-10
Scotland	Papua New Guinea	22-11
South Africa	Norfolk Island	27-9
Israel	Wales	22-13
England	Cook Islands	28-8
Round 4 - Jan 13		
Canada	South Africa	21-12
Scotland	Cook Islands	24-14
England	Papua New Guinea	13-11
Hong Kong	Israel	20-14
Norfolk Island	Guernsey	18-15
Round 5 - Jan 13		
Canada	Israel	20-11
Scotland	South Africa	21-7
England	Guernsey	26-9
Hong Kong	Cook Islands	23-14
Papua New Guinea	Wales	17-14
Round 6 - Jan 14		
Canada	Scotland	22-13
South Africa	Cook Islands	30-9
England	Norfolk Island	20-7
Hong Kong	Wales	20-13
Papua New Guinea	Guernsey	25-12
Round 7 - Jan 14		
Scotland	Wales	36-5
England	Canada	19-12
Guernsey	Cook Islands	16-14
Hong Kong	Norfolk Island	19-10
Papua New Guinea	Israel	16-11
Round 8 - Jan 15		
Canada	Wales	26-6
Scotland	Norfolk Island	28-12
South Africa	Papua New Guinea	22-17
Israel	Guernsey	20-10
England	Hong Kong	17-9
Round 9 - Jan 15		
Canada	Hong Kong	27-11
Wales	Norfolk Island	20-15
Scotland	England	21-13
South Africa	Guernsey	24-11
Cook Islands	Israel	17-16
Round 10 - Jan 16		
Canada	Norfolk Island	24-11
Scotland	Hong Kong	25-12
South Africa	Israel	24-14
England	Wales	25-9
Cook Islands	Papua New Guinea	31-10
Round 11 - Jan 16		
Scotland	Israel	20-13
Guernsey	Wales	14-13
Hong Kong	South Africa	15-14
Cook Islands	Canada	13-8
Norfolk Island	Papua New Guinea	18-14

men's pairs Section 2
Round 1 - Jan 12		
New Zealand	Fiji	21-9
Zimbabwe	Argentina	28-9
Namibia	Ireland	30-5
Australia	Thailand	47-2
Spain	Brunei	24-6
Malaysia	Jersey	19-16
Round 2 - Jan 12		
Ireland	Fiji	19-9
New Zealand	Zimbabwe	19-14
Namibia	Argentina	29-6
Jersey	Brunei	18-13
Spain	Thailand	29-12
Malaysia	Australia	17-15
Round 3 - Jan 13		
New Zealand	Namibia	26-9
Zimbabwe	Ireland	16-13
Jersey	Thailand	32-11
Australia	Brunei	22-16
Fiji	Argentina	33-5
Malaysia	Spain	36-4
Round 4 - Jan 13		
Ireland	Jersey	22-8
New Zealand	Australia	19-18
Namibia	Brunei	19-16
Spain	Argentina	25-14
Fiji	Malaysia	23-9
Thailand	Zimbabwe	19-12
Round 5 - Jan 13		
New Zealand	Spain	24-7
Namibia	Thailand	30-9
Australia	Ireland	19-10
Argentina	Jersey	17-15
Malaysia	Zimbabwe	33-15
Brunei	Fiji	21-15
Round 6 - Jan 14		
New Zealand	Argentina	30-6
Australia	Spain	19-11
Fiji	Namibia	27-6
Malaysia	Brunei	25-17
Thailand	Ireland	16-15
Zimbabwe	Jersey	17-17
Round 7 - Jan 14		
New Zealand	Thailand	39-8
Zimbabwe	Spain	20-12
Namibia	Jersey	20-14
Fiji	Australia	13-11
Malaysia	Ireland	14-12
Brunei	Argentina	20-17
Round 8 - Jan 15		
Ireland	Brunei	15-13
Namibia	Spain	16-15
Australia	Zimbabwe	20-15
Argentina	Thailand	19-13
Fiji	Jersey	23-11
Malaysia	New Zealand	16-13
Round 9 - Jan 15		
Ireland	Argentina	21-9
New Zealand	Brunei	25-12
Zimbabwe	Namibia	15-13
Australia	Jersey	21-9
Fiji	Spain	17-15
Malaysia	Thailand	36-8
Round 10 - Jan 16		
New Zealand	Ireland	16-9
Jersey	Spain	24-10
Australia	Namibia	22-9
Fiji	Zimbabwe	28-11
Malaysia	Argentina	29-11
Brunei	Thailand	39-12
Round 11 - Jan 16		
Ireland	Spain	20-14
New Zealand	Jersey	26-12
Zimbabwe	Brunei	22-9
Australia	Argentina	27-8
Fiji	Thailand	24-17
Malaysia	Namibia	18-11
