= Addinall =

Addinall is an English surname. Notable people with the surname include:

- Bert Addinall (1921–2005), English football player
- Percy Addinall (1888–1932), English football player
- Shaun Addinall (born 1969), South African lawn bowler
