= 2004 World Outdoor Bowls Championship – Men's singles =

Lawn bowls event

World Bowls Championship 2004 men's singles
- 10th World Outdoor Bowls Championships
- Location: Ayr, Scotland
- Date(s): 23 July – 7 August, 2004
- Category: World Bowls Championship

The 2004 World Outdoor Bowls Championship men's singles was held at the Northfield Bowls Complex in Ayr, Scotland, from 23 July to 7 August 2004.

Steve Glasson of Australia won the gold medal.

== Qualifying round ==
=== Section 1 ===
Pos	Player	P	W	L	F	A	Pts
1	(Scotland) Alex Marshall	5	5	0	105	41	10
2	(United States) Merton Isaacman	5	3	2	88	89	6
3	(Fiji) Caucau Turagabeci	5	2	3	87	91	4
4	(Philippines) Christopher Dagpin	5	2	3	90	97	4
5	Jeremy Henry	5	2	3	83	94	4
6	(Kenya) Eric Langton	5	1	4	58	99	2

=== Section 2 ===
Pos	Player	P	W	L	F	A	Pts
1	(Australia) Steve Glasson	5	5	0	105	45	10
2	(New Zealand) Russell Meyer	5	4	1	91	84	8
3	(Malaysia) Mohd Afendy Tan Abdullah	5	3	2	91	70	6
4	(Namibia) Douw Calitz	5	1	4	72	99	2
5	(Canada) David Anderson	5	1	4	66	94	2
6	(Samoa) Iremia Leautuli	5	1	4	68	101	2

=== Section 3 ===
Pos	Player	P	W	L	F	A	Pts
1	(Wales) Jason Greenslade	5	5	0	105	50	10
2	(England) Stephen Farish	5	3	2	97	71	6
3	(Eswatini) William James	5	3	2	82	73	6
4	(Hong Kong) Adam Poynton	5	2	3	80	83	4
5	(Spain) John Young	5	2	3	80	90	4
6	(Japan) Junichiro Yoshida	5	0	5	28	105	0

=== Section 4 ===
Pos	Player	P	W	L	F	A	Pts
1	(South Africa) Donald Piketh	5	5	0	105	37	10
2	(Israel) Jeff Rabkin	5	4	1	92	63	8
3	(Jersey) Alan Quemard	5	3	2	79	94	6
4	(Brazil) Patrick Knight	5	2	3	89	83	4
5	(Norfolk Island) Ron Campion	5	1	4	56	101	2
6	(Zimbabwe) Denis Streak	5	0	5	62	105	0

== Championship round ==
=== Section 1 ===
Pos	Player	P	W	L	F	A	Pts
1	(Australia) Glasson	5	4	1	104	97	8
2	(Fiji) Turagabeci	5	3	2	98	80	6
3	(Israel) Rabkin	5	2	3	94	76	4
4	(Wales) Greenslade	5	2	3	84	89	4
5	(United States) Isaacman	5	2	3	85	95	4
6	(Eswatini) James	5	2	3	74	102	4

=== Section 2 ===
Pos	Player	P	W	L	F	A	Pts
1	(Scotland) Marshall	5	5	0	105	46	10
2	(New Zealand) Meyer	5	4	1	103	67	8
3	(England) Farish	5	3	2	91	791	6
4	(Malaysia) Abdullah Tan	5	1	4	64	96	2
5	(South Africa) Piketh	5	1	4	61	95	2
6	(Jersey) Quemard	5	1	4	55	104	2

== Bronze medal match ==
Meyer beat Turagabeci 15–9

== Gold medal match ==
Glasson beat Marshall 21–15

== Results ==
Men's singles section 1
Round 1 – Aug 1		
Fiji	Philippines	21–17
Ireland	Kenya	21–12
Scotland	United States	21–6
Round 2 – Aug 1		
Fiji	Kenya	21–11
United States	Ireland	21–17
Scotland	Philippines	21–16
Round 3 – Aug 2		
Philippines	Ireland	21–15
Scotland	Fiji	21–8
United States	Kenya	21–12
Round 4 – Aug 2		
Ireland	Fiji	21–19
Scotland	Kenya	21–2
Philippines	United States	21–19
Round 5 – Aug 3		
United States	Fiji	21–18
Scotland	Ireland	21–7
Kenya	Philippines	21–15

Men's singles section 2
Round 1 – Aug 1		
Australia	Namibia	21–15
Malaysia	Samoa	21–10
New Zealand	Canada	21–13
Round 2 – Aug 1		
Australia	Canada	21–3
Malaysia	Namibia	21–4
New Zealand	Samoa	21–19
Round 3 – Aug 2		
Australia	Samoa	21–8
Namibia	Canada	21–15
New Zealand	Malaysia	21–16
Round 4 – Aug 2		
Australia	Malaysia	21–12
Canada	Samoa	21–10
New Zealand	Namibia	21–15
Round 5 – Aug 3		
Australia	New Zealand	21–7
Malaysia	Canada	21–14
Samoa	Namibia	21–17

Men's singles section 3
Round 1 – Aug 1		
Spain	England	21–18
(Eswatini) Swaziland	Hong Kong	21–11
Wales	Japan	21–4
Round 2 – Aug 1		
England	(Eswatini) Swaziland	21–10
Hong Kong	Japan	21–9
Wales	Spain	21–13
Round 3 – Aug 2		
England	Japan	21–0
Wales	Hong Kong	21–8
(Eswatini) Swaziland	Spain	21–14
Round 4 – Aug 2		
Wales	England	21–16
Hong Kong	Spain	21–11
(Eswatini) Swaziland	Japan	21–6
Round 5 – Aug 3		
England	Hong Kong	21–19
Spain	Japan	21–9
Wales	(Eswatini) Swaziland	21–9

Men's singles section 4
Round 1 – Aug 1		
Israel	Brazil	21–18
South Africa	Norfolk Island	21–7
Jersey	Zimbabwe	21–19
Round 2 – Aug 1		
Israel	Jersey	21–12
South Africa	Brazil	21–11
Norfolk Island	Zimbabwe	21–17
Round 3 – Aug 2		
Israel	Norfolk Island	21–6
Jersey	Brazil	21–18
South Africa	Zimbabwe	21–7
Round 4 – Aug 2		
South Africa	Israel	21–8
Jersey	Norfolk Island	21–15
Brazil	Zimbabwe	21–13
Round 5 – Aug 3		
Brazil	Norfolk Island	21–7
Israel	Zimbabwe	21–6
South Africa	Jersey	21–4

men's singles Championship Section A
Round 1 – Aug 3		
Australia	Wales	21–20
United States	Israel	21–19
(Eswatini) Swaziland	Fiji	21–20
Round 2 – Aug 4		
Australia	United States	21–19
Wales	(Eswatini) Swaziland	21–11
Fiji	Israel	21–13
Round 3 – Aug 4		
Fiji	Australia	21–20
Israel	(Eswatini) Swaziland	21–4
United States	Wales	21–13
Round 4 – Aug 5		
(Eswatini) Swaziland	United States	21–19
Australia	Israel	21–20
Wales	Fiji	21–15
Round 5 – Aug 5		
Israel	Wales	21–9
Fiji	United States	21–5
Australia	(Eswatini) Swaziland	21–17

men's singles Championship Section B
Round 1 – Aug 3		
Scotland	South Africa	21–3
New Zealand	England	21–16
Jersey	Malaysia	21–20
Round 2 – Aug 4		
Scotland	New Zealand	21–19
South Africa	Jersey	21–11
England	Malaysia	21–9
Round 3 – Aug 4		
Scotland	Malaysia	21–7
England	Jersey	21–7
New Zealand	South Africa	21–17
Round 4 – Aug 5		
New Zealand	Jersey	21–11
Scotland	England	21–12
Malaysia	South Africa	21–12
Round 5 – Aug 5		
England	South Africa	21–12
New Zealand	Malaysia	21–7
Scotland	Jersey	21–5
