= Lawn bowls at the 2010 Commonwealth Games =

Bowls event

- Venue: Yamuna Sports Complex
- Location: Delhi, India
- Dates: 4 October – 13 October 2010

Lawn bowls at the 2010 Commonwealth Games was the 18th appearance of lawn bowls at the Commonwealth Games. The lawn bowls competition was held at the J.N. Sports Complex in Delhi, India. The events were held from 4 to 13 October 2010.

== Events ==
=== Men ===
Event	Gold	Silver	Bronze
Singles	Robert Weale; Wales	Leif Selby; Australia	Gary Kelly; Northern Ireland
Pairs	South Africa Shaun Addinall; Gerry Baker	England Stuart Airey; Mervyn King	Malaysia Khairul Annuar Abdul Kadir; Fairul Izwan Abd Muin
Triples	South Africa Johann Pierre du Plessis; Wayne Perry; Gidion Vermeulen	Australia Mark Casey; Wayne Turley; Brett Wilkie	England Mark Bantock; Robert Newman; Graham Shadwell

=== Women ===
Event	Gold	Silver	Bronze
Singles	Natalie Melmore; England	Val Smith; New Zealand	Kelsey Cottrell; Australia
Pairs	England Ellen Falkner; Amy Monkhouse	Malaysia Nor Hashimah Ismail; Zuraini Khalid	Wales Anwen Butten; Hannah Smith
Triples	South Africa Tracy-Lee Botha; Susan Nel; Santjie Steyn	Australia Claire Duke; Julie Keegan; Sharyn Renshaw	England Sian Gordon; Sandy Hazell; Jamie-Lea Winch

== Medal table ==
Rank	Nation	Gold	Silver	Bronze	Total
1	South Africa	3	0	0	3
2	England	2	1	2	5
3	Wales	1	0	1	2
4	Australia	0	3	1	4
5	Malaysia	0	1	1	2
6	New Zealand	0	1	0	1
7	Northern Ireland	0	0	1	1
Totals (7 entries)		6	6	6	18

== Participating nations ==
- Australia (12)
- Botswana (12)
- Brunei (11)
- Canada (12)
- Cook Islands (12)
- England (12)
- Falkland Islands (2)
- Guernsey (9)
- India (12)
- Jersey (12)
- Kenya (6)
- Malaysia (12)
- Malawi (3)
- Malta (7)
- Namibia (10)
- New Zealand (12)
- Niue (12)
- Norfolk Island (9)
- Northern Ireland (11)
- Papua New Guinea (12)
- Samoa (6)
- Scotland (12)
- Singapore (6)
- South Africa (12)
- Swaziland (4)
- Wales (12)
- Zambia (3)

== See also ==
- List of Commonwealth Games medallists in lawn bowls
- Lawn bowls at the Commonwealth Games
