= Janet Dando =

International lawn bowler

Personal information
- Nationality: Spanish
Medal record
Representing Spain
Atlantic Bowls Championships
Bronze medal – third place	2011 Paphos	triples
European Championships
Gold medal – first place	2013 Spain	pairs
Bronze medal – third place	2013 Spain	mixed
Bronze medal – third place	2013 Spain	team

Janet Dando is an international lawn bowler representing Spain.

== Bowls career ==
Dando joined the Spanish squad in 2007. In 2011, she won a bronze medal in the triples with Sheri Fletcher and Debbie Colquhoun at the Atlantic Bowls Championships.

She represented Spain in the triples event and fours event at the 2012 World Outdoor Bowls Championship. In 2013, she won three medals including a gold medal at the European Bowls Championships in Spain.
