= Caucau Turagabeci =

Fijian lawn bowler

Personal information
- Born: 15 February 1939 Fiji
Medal record
Representing (Fiji)
Asia Pacific Bowls Championships
Silver medal – second place	1991 Kowloon	singles
Silver medal – second place	1999 Kuala Lumpur	singles
Silver medal – second place	2005 Melbourne	singles

Caucau Turagabeci is a former Fijian international lawn bowler.

== Bowls career ==
Turagabeci made his international debut in 1981 and has represented Fiji at three Commonwealth Games. He competed in the pairs event at the 1986 Commonwealth Games, the singles event at the 1998 Commonwealth Games and the singles event at the 2006 Commonwealth Games.

He just missed out on winning a World Championship bronze medal in 2004, after losing the bronze medal play off to Russell Meyer by a score of 15-9.

He won three silver medals at the Asia Pacific Bowls Championships.

His son Eminoni Turagabeci is also a Fijian lawn bowler.
