= Lawn bowls at the 2007 SEA Games =

Lawn bowls event

- Venue: Queen Sirikit Sport Centre
- Location: Pathum Thani, Thailand
- Date: 6 to 15 December 2007

Lawn bowls at the 2007 Southeast Asian Games was held in the lawn bowls stadium in Queen Sirikit Sport Centre, Pathum Thani, Thailand.

== Medalists ==
=== Men ===
Event	Gold	Silver	Bronze
Singles	Haji Naim Brahim; Brunei	Chia Tee Chiak; Singapore	Safuan Said; Malaysia
Pairs	Malaysia; Azim Azami Ariffin; Mohd Amir Mohd Yusof	Thailand; Chaithai Kanchanakaphan; Tanakrit Thamasarn	Brunei; Md Salleh Awang Hitam; Mohd Israt
Triples	Malaysia; Fairul Izwan Abd Muin; Azwan Shuhaimi; Zulhilmie Redzuan	Thailand; Tanongsak Klinsorn; Sakprasert Mitsaha; Winai Niklum	Philippines; Angelo Morales; Emmanuel Portacio; Hommer Mercado

=== Women ===
Event	Gold	Silver	Bronze
Singles	Songsin Tsao; Thailand	Siti Zalina Ahmad; Malaysia	Rosita Bradborn; Philippines
Pairs	Malaysia; Azlina Arshad; Emma Firyana Saroji	Philippines; Nancy Bercasio; Sonia Bruce	Thailand; Arpa Phonghanyudh; Buranwut Thonguaan
Triples	Malaysia; Maisarah Aminludin; Nur Fidrah Noh; Nor Hashimah Ismail	Thailand; Thong Oomen; Orawan Sodok; Saengjan Wareeram	Philippines; Ainie Knight; Milagros Witheridge; Ronalyn Greenlees
