= Roy Jennings =

Roy Jennings is the name of:

- Roy Jennings (footballer) (1931–2016), English football player and manager
- Roy Jennings (rugby union) (1905–1968), English rugby union player
- Roy Jennings (bowls), Lawn bowler from Israel
