= Sarah‑Jane Curran =

Bowls player from Northern Ireland

Sarah‑Jane Curran née Sarah‑Jane Coleman
Personal information
- Nationality: British (Northern Irish)
- Born: December 1984

Sport
- Sport: Lawn & indoor bowls
- Club: Ballymena BC
Medal record
Representing combined Ireland
Atlantic Bowls Championships
Bronze medal – third place	2011 Paphos	fours
European Championships
Bronze medal – third place	2015 Israel	mixed

Sarah‑Jane Curran (born 1984) née Sarah‑Jane Coleman is a Northern Irish international lawn and indoor bowler.

== Bowls career ==
In 2011, under her maiden name of Coleman she won the fours bronze medal at the Atlantic Bowls Championships.

The following year she was selected for a combined Ireland team at the 2012 World Outdoor Bowls Championship, where she competed in the triples event and fours event.

In 2016, she competed in her second World Outdoor Championship in the fours and pairs.

In 2016, Curran won the finals in both the triples and fours of the Provincial Towns Women's Bowling Association Championships. She then became an Irish national champion in 2016 after winning the triples at the Irish National Bowls Championships.

== Personal life ==
She is a Director of the County Antrim Indoor Bowling Club.
