= 2016 World Outdoor Bowls Championship – Men's pairs =

World Outdoor Championships 2016 men's pairs
- 13th World Outdoor Bowls Championships
- Location: Christchurch, New Zealand
- Date: 29 November – 11 December 2016
- Category: 2016 World Outdoor Bowls Championship

The 2016 World Outdoor Bowls Championship men's pairs was held at the Burnside Bowling Club in Avonhead, Christchurch, New Zealand, from 29 November to 4 December 2016.

The men's pairs gold medal went to Aaron Wilson and Brett Wilkie of Australia.

== Section tables ==
=== Section 1 ===
Team	Player	P	W	D	L	Pts	Shots
1	(Australia) Aaron Wilson, Brett Wilkie	9	7	1	1	15	+51
2	(England) Sam Tolchard, Louis Ridout	9	7	0	2	14	+72
3	(Scotland) Alex Marshall, Paul Foster	9	6	0	3	12	+43
4	(Hong Kong) James Po, Tony Cheung	9	6	0	3	12	+36
5	(Jersey) Malcolm De Sousa, Scott Ruderham	9	5	1	3	11	+19
6	(Canada) Ryan Bester, Steve Santana	9	5	0	4	10	+10
7	(South Africa) Gerry Baker, Jason Evans	9	3	0	6	6	−25
8	(Fiji) Samuela Tuikiligana, Kushal Pillay	9	3	0	6	6	−36
9	(Singapore) Chia Tee Chiak, Christian Huang	9	2	0	7	4	−79
10	(Cyprus) Loukas Paraskeva, Michael Jarvis	9	0	0	9	0	−99

=== Section 2 ===
Team	Player	P	W	D	L	Pts	Shots
1	(New Zealand) Mike Kernaghan, Shannon McIlroy	9	8	0	1	16	+94
2	(Malaysia) Fairul Izwan Abd Muin, Muhammad Hizlee Abdul Rais	9	8	0	1	16	+92
3	Gary Kelly, Ian McClure	9	6	0	3	12	+41
4	(Wales) Jonathan Tomlinson, Marc Wyatt	9	6	0	3	12	+34
5	(United States) Aaron Zangl, Charlie Herbert	9	5	0	4	10	−1
6	(Guernsey) Todd Priaulx, Matt Solway	9	3	1	5	7	−38
7	(Israel) Tzvika Hadar, Dan Slodownik	9	3	0	6	6	−29
8	(Spain) Derek Eldon, Tom Rogers	9	2	1	6	5	−68
9	(Norfolk Island) John Christian, Ryan Dixon	9	2	0	7	4	−30
10	(India) Sunil Bahadur, Naveet Rathi	9	1	0	8	2	−95

== Finals ==
Play Offs
Australia	bye
Scotland	14
Malaysia	12
England	10
Ireland	17
New Zealand	bye

Semifinals
Australia	17
Scotland	11
Ireland	17
New Zealand	10

Gold medal
Australia	18
Ireland	7

== Results ==
Men's pairs section 1
Round 1 – 29 Nov		
Canada	Singapore	22–14
England	Jersey	28–11
Australia	South Africa	17–11
Scotland	Cyprus	30–10
Hong Kong	Fiji	19–14
Round 2 – 29 Nov		
Scotland	Singapore	20–17
Hong Kong	Canada	19–14
South Africa	England	16–15
Australia	Jersey	14–14
Fiji	Cyprus	18–15
Round 3 – 29 Nov		
Hong Kong	Cyprus	24–10
South Africa	Singapore	22–10
Canada	Jersey	16–12
England	Fiji	19–8
Australia	Scotland	16–11
Round 4 – 30 Nov		
England	Hong Kong	18–16
Scotland	Canada	16–14
Singapore	Australia	16–15
Fiji	South Africa	22–11
Jersey	Cyprus	19–10
Round 5 – 30 Nov		
England	Canada	19–9
Australia	Fiji	19–10
Scotland	Jersey	21–9
South Africa	Cyprus	29–16
Hong Kong	Singapore	23–7
Round 6 – 30 Nov		
Scotland	South Africa	16–12
England	Cyprus	27–8
Australia	Hong Kong	24–13
Jersey	Singapore	32–9
Brunei	Zimbabwe	21–12
Round 7 – 1 Dec		
Australia	England	16–15
Hong Kong	Scotland	22–18
Canada	Cyprus	16–12
Jersey	South Africa	24–12
Fiji	Singapore	24–13
Round 8 – 1 Dec		
Australia	Cyprus	26–13
England	Singapore	24–13
Scotland	Fiji	24–9
Jersey	Hong Kong	18–11
Canada	South Africa	21–15
Round 9 – 1 Dec		
Australia	Canada	21–14
England	Scotland	15–11
Hong Kong	South Africa	23–11
Jersey	Fiji	15–14
Singapore	Cyprus	19–15

Men's pairs section 2
Round 1 – 29 Nov		
United States	India	28–15
Israel	Norfolk Island	18–16
Wales	Guernsey	23–9
Ireland	Spain	27–8
New Zealand	Malaysia	12–11
Round 2 – 29 Nov		
United States	Spain	26–10
India	New Zealand	17–13
Wales	Israel	32–10
Guernsey	Norfolk Island	20–10
Malaysia	Ireland	21–10
Round 3 – 29 Nov		
New Zealand	Ireland	23–13
Wales	United States	21–17
Norfolk Island	India	29–9
Malaysia	Israel	16–15
Guernsey	Spain	15–15
Round 4 – 30 Nov		
United States	Guernsey	14–12
Malaysia	Wales	23–9
New Zealand	Israel	24–8
Ireland	Norfolk Island	26–11
Spain	India	22–11
Round 5 – 30 Nov		
Israel	India	20–11
Malaysia	Guernsey	33–9
Spain	Norfolk Island	17–16
Wales	Ireland	18–10
New Zealand	United States	24–10
Round 6 – 30 Nov		
Wales	Spain	15–13
Malaysia	India	24–12
New Zealand	Guernsey	20–5
United States	Norfolk Island	16–9
Ireland	Israel	23–12
Round 7 – 1 Dec		
Malaysia	United States	30–8
New Zealand	Spain	27–10
Norfolk Island	Wales	14–11
Ireland	India	31–12
Guernsey	Israel	17–15
Round 8 – 1 Dec		
New Zealand	Norfolk Island	28–11
Malaysia	Spain	17–9
Ireland	Guernsey	16–15
United States	Israel	22–16
Wales	India	18–9
Round 9 – 1 Dec		
New Zealand	Wales	21–13
Malaysia	Norfolk Island	18–17
Ireland	United States	18–13
Guernsey	India	18–12
Israel	Spain	28–10
