= World Cup Singles =

International indoor bowls competition

Tournament information
- Sport: Bowls
- Location: Various
- Established: 2005
- Defunct: 2019
- Administrator: World Bowls

The World Cup Singles was an event inaugurated in 2005 by the organisation known as World Bowls and was held until 2019. It was contested annually between bowlers from national bowls organisations. The competition was seen as the Southern Hemisphere equivalent of the World Indoor Bowls Championships held annually in the United Kingdom and organised by the World Bowls Tour.

== History ==
The event was first held from 3-10 April 2005, at the Hong Kong Football Club indoor bowling green and Ap Lei Chau Sports Centre in Hong Kong but eventually took place every year at the Warilla Bowls Club in New South Wales, Australia.

Although players from both hemispheres were able to compete, travelling restricted the entries and the majority of the leading indoor players from the Northern hemisphere did not take part.

In 2019, World Bowls came to an agreement with the International Indoor Bowls Council (IIBC), formerly the WIBC. The agreement was to merge their two international indoor championships, the World Cup Singles and the IIBC Championships. The new event would be called the World Bowls Indoor Championships.

== Past winners ==
=== Men's singles ===
Year	Winner	Runner-up
2005	(Australia) Mark Casey	(Hong Kong) Terence Lee
2006	(Scotland) Neil Speirs	(Malaysia) Safuan Said
2007	(Australia) Kelvin Kerkow	(Australia) Jeremy Henry
2008	(Malaysia) Safuan Said	(New Zealand) Ali Forsyth
2009	(Australia) Leif Selby	(Malaysia) Safuan Said
2010	(Australia) Leif Selby	(Australia) Anthony Kiepe
2011	James Talbot	(Scotland) Graeme Archer
2012	(Australia) Jeremy Henry	James Talbot
2013	(Australia) Jeremy Henry	(New Zealand) Tony Grantham
2014	(Australia) Jeremy Henry	(Australia) Tony Wood
2015	(Scotland) Iain McLean	(Australia) David Holt
2016	(Australia) Jeremy Henry	Andrew Kyle
2017	(Australia) Jeremy Henry	(Malaysia) Muhammad Soufi Rusli
2018	(Australia) Jeremy Henry	(Australia) David Ferguson
2019	Gary Kelly	(Malta) Brendan Aquilina

=== Women's singles ===
Year	Winner	Runner-up
2005	(Hong Kong) Grace Chu	(Fiji) Litia Tikoisuva
2006	(Canada) Shirley Choy	(England) Doreen Hankin
2007	(Australia) Judy Nardella	(South Africa) Lorna Trigwell
2008	(Guernsey) Alison Merrien	(New Zealand) Val Smith
2009	(New Zealand) Jo Edwards	(Australia) Karen Murphy
2010	(New Zealand) Jo Edwards	(Australia) Karen Murphy
2011	(New Zealand) Jo Edwards	(Guernsey) Alison Merrien
2012	(Guernsey) Alison Merrien	(New Zealand) Jo Edwards
2013	(New Zealand) Jo Edwards	(Guernsey) Alison Merrien
2014	(Scotland) Caroline Brown	(Guernsey) Alison Merrien
2015	(Malaysia) Siti Zalina Ahmad	(Scotland) Julie Forrest
2016	(Norfolk Island) Carmen Anderson	(Malaysia) Siti Zalina Ahmad
2017	(New Zealand) Jo Edwards	(Guernsey) Lucy Beere
2018	(Guernsey) Lucy Beere	(Australia) Rebecca Van Asch
2019	(New Zealand) Jo Edwards	(Guernsey) Lucy Beere

== See also ==
World Bowls Events
