= Stephen Farish =

British bowls player

Personal information
- Full name: Stephen Edward Farish
- Nationality: British (English)
- Born: 12 August 1970 (age 55)

Sport
- Sport: Lawn bowls
- Club: Wigton Bowling Club
Medal record
Representing England
World Outdoor Championships
Bronze medal – third place	2008 Christchurch	fours
Commonwealth Games
Silver medal – second place	2002 Manchester	pairs
British Isles Championships
Gold medal – first place	2001	pairs
Gold medal – first place	1998	triples

Stephen Edward Farish (born 12 August 1970) is an English international bowls player.

== Biography ==
In 1992, Farish won the national singles title after defeating Hugh Duff in the final. He has further National Championship titles in 1997 and 2000.

In 2002 he won a silver medal with Dean Morgan in the pairs at the 2002 Commonwealth Games in Manchester.

In 2008 he won a bronze medal with Mark Bantock, Robert Newman and Graham Shadwell in the fours at the 2008 World Outdoor Bowls Championship in Christchurch, New Zealand.
