= Johann Pierre du Plessis =

Personal information
- Nationality: South African
- Born: 8 September 1960 (age 65)

Sport
- Sport: Lawn bowls
Medal record
Representing South Africa
Men's lawn bowls
Commonwealth Games
Gold medal – first place	2010 Delhi	Men's triples
Atlantic Bowls Championships
Gold medal – first place	2009 Johannesburg	fours

Johann Pierre du Plessis is a South African international lawn bowler.

== Bowls career ==
In 2009 he won the fours gold medal at the Atlantic Bowls Championships.

He won a gold medal in the Men's triples at the 2010 Commonwealth Games with Wayne Perry and Gidion Vermeulen.
