= Allan Saitowitz =

Israeli lawn bowler

Personal information
- Native name: אלן סייטוביץ
- Nationality: Israeli
Medal record
Representing (Israel)
Atlantic Bowls Championships
Bronze medal – third place	2011 Cyprus	fours
European Championships
Bronze medal – third place	2022 Ayr	triples
Bronze medal – third place	2024 Ayr	fours

Allan Saitowitz (Hebrew: אלן סייטוביץ) is an Israeli international lawn bowler.

== Bowls career ==
Saitowitz won a fours bronze medal (with Yair Bekier, Roi Ben-Ari and Colin Silberstein) at the 2011 Atlantic Bowls Championships.

He was selected as part of the five man team by Israel for the 2020 World Outdoor Bowls Championship but the event was cancelled due to the COVID-19 pandemic. In 2022, he won triples bronze at the European Bowls Championships.

In 2023, he was selected as part of the team to represent Israel at the 2023 World Outdoor Bowls Championship. He participated in the men's triples and the men's fours events.

Saitowitz was in the fours team that won the bronze medal at the 2024 European Bowls Championships.
