= John Lowery (bowls) =

Jersey international lawn bowler

Personal information
- Nationality: British (Jersey)
- Born: 14 August 1979 (age 46) Jersey, Channel Islands

Sport
- Club: Jersey BC
Medal record
Representing Jersey
Atlantic Bowls Championships
Bronze medal – third place	2009 Johannesburg	fours

John James Lowery (born 14 August 1979) is a Jersey international lawn bowler.

== Bowls career ==
Lowery won the fours bronze medal at the 2009 Atlantic Bowls Championships in Johannesburg.

He has represented Jersey at three Commonwealth Games. At the 2006 Commonwealth Games he competed in the triples, at the 2010 Commonwealth Games he competed in the pairs, where he reached the quarter finals, just missing out on a medal and finally at the 2014 Commonwealth Games he took part in both the triples and fours events.
