= Leo Carreon =

Filipino lawn bowler

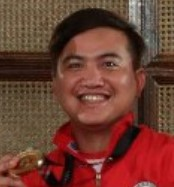
- Carreon in 2017

Personal information
- Nationality: Filipino
Medal record
Representing (Philippines)
Asia Pacific Bowls Championships
Bronze medal – third place	2009 Kuala Lumpur	fours
Southeast Asian Games
Gold medal – first place	2017 Kuala Lumpur	fours
Asian Lawn Bowls Championship
Gold medal – first place	2023 Kuala Lumpur	triples

Leoncio Carreon Jr. is a Filipino international lawn bowler.

== Bowls career ==
He won a fours bronze medal (with Christopher Dagpin, Angelo Morales and Ronald Lising) at the 2009 Asia Pacific Bowls Championships, held in Kuala Lumpur and a gold medal in the fours at the Lawn bowls at the 2017 Southeast Asian Games, his fours team consisted of Lising, Curte Robert Guarin and Emmanuel Portacio.

Carreon was selected as part of the five man team by the Philippines for the 2020 World Outdoor Bowls Championship, which was due to be held in the Gold Coast, Australia.

In 2023, he won the triples gold medal (with Ronald Lising and Hommer Mercado) at the 14th Asian Lawn Bowls Championship in Kuala Lumpur. Later in 2023, he was selected as part of the team to represent the Philippines at the 2023 World Outdoor Bowls Championship. He participated in the men's triples and the men's fours events.
