= Lynn Stein =

Scottish Lawn bowler

Personal information
- Nationality: British (Scottish)
- Born: 27 January 1968 (age 58)

Sport
- Club: Wingygates Durievale BC

Achievements and titles
- Highest world ranking: 38 (September 2024)
Medal record
Representing Scotland
Lawn Bowls
World Outdoor Championships
Gold medal – first place	2012 Adelaide	Women's fours
Bronze medal – third place	2012 Adelaide	Women's triples
Bronze medal – third place	2012 Adelaide	Women's team
British Isles Championships
Gold medal – first place	2019	triples
Gold medal – first place	2024	fours
European Championships
Bronze medal – third place	2007 Cyprus	overall
Silver medal – second place	2007 Cyprus	singles
Silver medal – second place	2007 Cyprus	team
Bronze medal – third place	2009 Cyprus	singles
Gold medal – first place	2009 Cyprus	team
Silver medal – second place	2013 Spain	mixed
Silver medal – second place	2013 Spain	team

Lynn Stein is a Scottish international bowls player.

== Bowls career ==
In 207, she won three medals at the European Bowls Championships in Cyprus and two years later won two more medals including a gold at the same Championships. She reached a career high ranking of world number 38 in September 2024.

She won a gold medal in the women's fours event (with Margaret Letham, Caroline Brown and Michelle Cooper) at the 2012 World Outdoor Bowls Championship. One year later in 2013, she won her 6th and 7th medals at the European Bowls Championships in Spain.

Stein became a British champion after winning the 2019 triples title, at the British Isles Bowls Championships. This followed on from her triples success at the Scottish National Bowls Championships the previous year for Leven BC.

In 2023, she won a second national title after winning the fours with Wingygates Durievale BC. Her son Christopher Stein won the men's fours title during the same championship. Stein subsequently won the fours title at the 2024 British Isles Bowls Championships.
