= Khairul Annuar Abdul Kadir =

Malaysian lawn bowler (born 1985)

Personal information
- Nationality: Malaysian
- Born: 26 July 1985 (age 40)
Medal record
Representing Malaysia
Commonwealth Games
Bronze medal – third place	2010 Delhi	Men's pairs
Asia Pacific Bowls Championships
Bronze medal – third place	2007 Christchurch	triples

Khairul Annuar Abdul Kadir is a Malaysian international lawn bowler.

== Bowls career ==
Kadir won a bronze medal in the men's pairs with Fairul Izwan Abd Muin at the 2010 Commonwealth Games in Delhi.

He won the triples bronze medal at the 2007 Asia Pacific Bowls Championships, in Christchurch, New Zealand.
