= Wayne Ruediger =

Australian bowls player

Personal information
- Nationality: Australian
- Born: 15 August 1976 (age 49) Mount Barker, Australia

Sport
- Sport: Lawn bowls
Medal record
Representing Australia
Commonwealth Games
Bronze medal – third place	2014 Glasgow	Men's fours
World Outdoor Championships
Gold medal – first place	2012 Adelaide	Men's fours
Silver medal – second place	2012 Adelaide	Men's triples
Gold medal – first place	2012 Adelaide	Men's team
Asia Pacific Bowls Championships
Bronze medal – third place	2015 Christchurch	triples
Silver medal – second place	2015 Christchurch	fours

Wayne Ruediger (born 15 August 1976) is an Australian international lawn bowler.

== Bowls career ==
Ruediger won the gold medal in the fours with Aron Sherriff, Mark Casey and Brett Wilkie during the 2012 World Outdoor Bowls Championship in Adelaide.

He competed in the men's fours at the 2014 Commonwealth Games where he won a bronze medal.

He won two medals at the 2015 Asia Pacific Bowls Championships in Christchurch.

In 2022, he won his third fours title at the Australian Open.
