= Percy Addinall =

English footballer (1888–1932)

Personal information
- Date of birth: 1888
- Place of birth: Hull, England
- Date of death: 1932 (aged 43–44)
- Position: Left half

Senior career*
Years	Team	Apps	(Gls)
- West End (Lincoln)
1919	Lincoln City	15	(0)
- Grantham Town
- * Club domestic league appearances and goals

Percy Addinall (1888–1932) was a footballer who played in the Football League as a left half for Lincoln City.
