= Gidion Vermeulen =

South African lawn bowler

Personal information
- Nationality: South African
- Born: 18 July 1970 (age 55)

Sport
- Sport: Lawn bowls
- Club: Westville BC
Medal record
Representing South Africa
Men's lawn bowls
Commonwealth Games
Bronze medal – third place	2006 Melbourne	Men's triples
Gold medal – first place	2010 Delhi	Men's triples
World Outdoor Championships
Silver medal – second place	2012 Adelaide	Men's fours
Bronze medal – third place	2012 Adelaide	Men's team
Atlantic Bowls Championships
Bronze medal – third place	2011 Paphos	triples

Gidion Vermeulen is a South African international lawn bowler.

== Bowls career ==
He won a gold medal in the Men's triples at the 2010 Commonwealth Games with Johann Pierre du Plessis and Wayne Perry.

He finished runner-up in the 2010 pairs at the National Championships bowling for the Westville Bowls Club.

In 2011 he won the triples bronze medal at the Atlantic Bowls Championships. The following year he won a silver medal in the fours at the 2012 World Outdoor Bowls Championship.
