= Roy Jennings (bowls) =

Israeli lawn bowler

Personal information
- Native name: רוי ג'נינגס
- Nationality: Israeli
Medal record
Representing (Israel)
Atlantic Bowls Championships
Bronze medal – third place	2011 Cyprus	fours

Roy Harold Jennings (Hebrew: רוי הרולד ג'נינגס), previously known as Roy Ben-Ari (Hebrew: רועי בן-ארי), is an Israeli international lawn bowler.

== Bowls career ==
Jennings was selected as part of the five man team by Israel for the 2012 World Outdoor Bowls Championship in Adelaide, Australia.

He won a fours bronze medal (with Yair Bekier, Colin Silberstein and Allan Saitowitz) at the 2011 Atlantic Bowls Championships.
