= Christopher Dagpin =

Filipino lawn bowler

Personal information
- Nationality: Filipino
Medal record
Representing (Philippines)
Asia Pacific Bowls Championships
Bronze medal – third place	2009 Kuala Lumpur	fours

Christopher Ebaietor Dagpin is a Filipino international lawn bowler.

== Bowls career ==
Dagpin was selected as part of the five man team by the Philippines for the 2020 World Outdoor Bowls Championship, which was due to be held in the Gold Coast, Australia.

He won a fours bronze medal (with Angelo Morales, Leo Carreon and Ronald Lising), at the 2009 Asia Pacific Bowls Championships, held in Kuala Lumpur. In 2014, he won the Hong Kong International Bowls Classic pairs title with Angelo Morales.
