= Andrew Todd (bowls) =

New Zealand bowls player

Personal information
- Nationality: New Zealand
- Born: 16 December 1966 (age 59)

Sport
- Sport: Lawn bowls
- Club: Burnside BC
Medal record
Men's lawn bowls
Representing New Zealand
World Outdoor Championships
Gold medal – first place	2008 Christchurch	Men's fours
Gold medal – first place	2008 Christchurch	Men's team

Andrew Todd (born 6 December 1966) is a New Zealand international lawn bowler.

== Bowls career ==
In 2008 he won the gold medal in the fours at the 2008 World Outdoor Bowls Championship in Christchurch along with Gary Lawson, Russell Meyer and Richard Girvan.

Todd represented New Zealand at the 2010 Commonwealth Games.

He won the 2010 singles title at the New Zealand National Bowls Championships when bowling for the Burnside Bowls Club.
