= Lisa Forey =

Welsh bowler (born 1977)

Personal information
- Nationality: British (Welsh)
- Born: 6 July 1977 (age 48) Morriston, Wales

Sport
- Country: Welsh
Medal record
Representing Wales
World Outdoor Championships
Bronze medal – third place	2012 Adelaide	Women's triples
Bronze medal – third place	2012 Adelaide	Women's fours
British Isles Championships
Gold medal – first place	2016	pairs
European Championships
Bronze medal – third place	2011 Portugal	pairs
Gold medal – first place	2011 Portugal	mixed
Gold medal – first place	2011 Portugal	team

Lisa Jayne Forey (born 6 July 1977) in Morriston is a Welsh international lawn and indoor bowler.

== Bowls career ==
In 2011, she won three medals including two golds at the European Bowls Championships in Portugal. She won a bronze medal in the triples and fours at the 2012 World Outdoor Bowls Championship in Adelaide.

Forey became a British champion after winning the 2016 pairs with Barbara Griffith, at the British Isles Bowls Championships.
