= Graham Shadwell =

British lawn bowler

Personal information
- Nationality: British (English)
- Born: 22 July 1975 (age 50)

Sport
- Club: Cooper Avon
Medal record
Representing England
World Outdoor Championships
| Bronze medal – third place | 2008 Christchurch | Men's fours |
| Bronze medal – third place | 2012 Adelaide | Men's Pairs |
Commonwealth Games
| Bronze medal – third place | 2010 Delhi | Men's Triples |
Atlantic Bowls Championships
| Silver medal – second place | 2009 Johannesburg | triples |
| Silver medal – second place | 2009 Johannesburg | fours |
| Gold medal – first place | 2011 Paphos | triples |
| Bronze medal – third place | 2015 Paphos | pairs |

Graham Anthony George Shadwell (born 1975) is an English international bowls player.

== Bowls career ==
Shadwell won the 1999 national junior singles defeating Robert Newman in the final.

Shadwell won two bronze medals at consecutive World Outdoor Championships in 2008 in the fours with Mark Bantock, Stephen Farish and Robert Newman and in 2012 in the pairs with Jamie Chestney.

In between the two World Championships he won another bronze medal in the triples with Bantock and Newman at the lawn bowls competition at the 2010 Commonwealth Games.

In 2009 he won the triples and fours silver medals at the Atlantic Bowls Championships and in 2011 he won the triples gold medal at the Atlantic Bowls Championships. In 2015 he won the pairs bronze medal at the Atlantic Championships.

In 2004 & 2008, he won the Hong Kong International Bowls Classic pairs titles with Mark Walton. He was selected to represent England at the 2016 World Outdoor Bowls Championship but had to pull out and has won the English Indoor Bowling Association's Champion of Champions title twice.
