= Steve Santana =

Canadian lawn bowler

Personal information
- Nationality: Canadian
- Born: 1981 (age 44–45) Victoria, British Columbia, Canada

Sport
- Sport: Bowls
- Club: Vancouver South LBC
Medal record
Representing Canada
Asia Pacific Bowls Championships
| Gold medal – first place | 2015 Christchurch | pairs |

Steven 'Steve' Santana (born 1981) is a Canadian lawn bowler.

== Bowls career ==
Santana was the 2011 Canadian Singles Champion and represented Canada at the 2012 World Outdoor Bowls Championship.

He won a pairs gold medal with Ryan Bester at the 2015 Asia Pacific Bowls Championships in New Zealand.
