= Ronald Lising =

Filipino lawn bowler

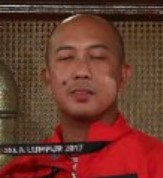
- Lising in 2017

Personal information
- Nationality: Filipino
Medal record
Representing (Philippines)
Asia Pacific Bowls Championships
| Bronze medal – third place | 2009 Kuala Lumpur | fours |
Southeast Asian Games
| Gold medal – first place | 2005 Angeles City | singles |
Asian Lawn Bowls Championship
| Gold medal – first place | 2012 Kuala Lumpur | fours |
| Gold medal – first place | 2023 Kuala Lumpur | triples |

Ronald Samia Lising is a Filipino international lawn bowler.

== Bowls career ==
In 2005, Lising won the gold medal in the singles event at the 2005 Southeast Asian Games in Angeles City.

He won a fours bronze medal (with Christopher Dagpin, Angelo Morales and Leo Carreon) at the 2009 Asia Pacific Bowls Championships, held in Kuala Lumpur.

In 2017, he won a gold medal in the fours at the Lawn bowls at the 2017 Southeast Asian Games, his fours team consisted of Leo Carreon, Curte Robert Guarin and Emmanuel Portacio.

Lising was selected as part of the five man team by the Philippines for the 2020 World Outdoor Bowls Championship, which was due to be held in the Gold Coast, Australia.

In 2023, he won the triples gold medal (with Carreon and Hommer Mercado) at the 14th Asian Lawn Bowls Championship in Kuala Lumpur. Later in 2023, he was selected as part of the team to represent the Philippines at the 2023 World Outdoor Bowls Championship. He participated in the men's triples and the men's fours events.
