= James Talbot (bowls) =

Personal information
- Nationality: Northern Irish
- Born: County Antrim, Northern Ireland
Medal record
Representing combined Ireland
World Outdoor Championships
Bronze medal – third place	2012 Adelaide	Men's triples
Bronze medal – third place	2012 Adelaide	Men's fours
British Isles Championships
Gold medal – first place	2002	fours

James Talbot is a Northern Irish international lawn and indoor bowler.

== Bowls career ==
Talbot is from County Antrim, in Northern Ireland and he won a bronze medal in the triples and fours at the 2012 World Outdoor Bowls Championship.

He won the gold medal at the 2011 World Cup Singles in Warilla, New South Wales, Australia.
