= Brett Wilkie =

Australian lawn bowler

Personal information
- Nationality: Australian
- Born: 7 June 1974 (age 52) Ballarat, Australia

Sport
- Sport: Lawn bowls
Medal record
Representing Australia
World Bowls Championship
Gold medal – first place	2012 Adelaide	fours
Silver medal – second place	2012 Adelaide	triples
Gold medal – first place	2012 Adelaide	team
Gold medal – first place	2016 Christchurch	pairs
Silver medal – second place	2016 Christchurch	fours
Silver medal – second place	2016 Christchurch	team
Commonwealth Games
Silver medal – second place	2010 Delhi	triples
Bronze medal – third place	2014 Glasgow	fours
Silver medal – second place	2018 Gold Coast	fours
World Singles Champion of Champions
Gold medal – first place	2009 Scotland	Men's Singles
Asia Pacific Bowls Championships
Silver medal – second place	2011 Adelaide	singles
Silver medal – second place	2011 Adelaide	pairs

Brett Wilkie is an Australian international lawn bowler.

== Bowls career ==
Wilkie came to prominence after winning the Australian national championship and qualifying for the 2009 World Singles Champion of Champions event, where he won the gold medal defeating Wayne Hogg of Scotland in the final.

He was selected to play for Australia during the 2010 Commonwealth Games in Delhi where he won a triples silver medal. Wilkie then won the gold medal in the fours with Aron Sherriff, Mark Casey and Wayne Ruediger during the 2012 World Outdoor Bowls Championship in Adelaide and a silver medal in the triples.

He competed in the men's fours at the 2014 Commonwealth Games where he won a bronze medal.

He won two silver medals at the 2011 Asia Pacific Bowls Championships in Adelaide.

He won a gold medal with bowls pairs partner Aaron Wilson in the pairs at the 2016 World Outdoor Bowls Championship and won a silver medal in the fours.

He was selected as part of the Australian team for the 2018 Commonwealth Games on the Gold Coast in Queensland where he claimed a silver medal in the Fours with Aron Sherriff, Barrie Lester, and Nathan Rice.
