= Billy Radloff =

South African international lawn bowler

Personal information
- Nationality: South African

Sport
- Sport: Lawn bowls
- Club: George BC; Knysna BC
Medal record
Representing South Africa
World Outdoor Championships
Bronze medal – third place	2008 Christchurch	fours
Atlantic Bowls Championships
Gold medal – first place	2007 Ayr	fours
Gold medal – first place	2019 Cardiff	triples

Billy Radloff is a South African international lawn bowler.

== Career ==
Radloff won his first cap for the South African national team in 2003. He won the bronze medal in the fours with Clinton Roets and Brian Dixon and Wayne Perry at the 2008 World Outdoor Bowls Championship in Christchurch.

In 2007 he won the fours gold medal at the Atlantic Bowls Championships.

In 2012, bowling for George BC, he won the pairs title with Japie Combrink at the South African National Bowls Championships and in 2019 he won the triples gold medal at the Atlantic Bowls Championships

A second national title did not arrive until 2025, when bowling for the Knysna BC, he won the pairs with John Rimbault.
