= Brian Dixon (bowls) =

South African international lawn bowler

Personal information
- Nationality: South Africa

Sport
- Sport: Lawn bowls
Medal record
Representing South Africa
World Outdoor Championships
Bronze medal – third place	2008 Christchurch	fours

Brian Dixon is a South African international lawn bowler.

Dixon won the bronze medal in the fours with Clinton Roets and Billy Radloff and Wayne Perry at the 2008 World Outdoor Bowls Championship in Christchurch.
