= Angelo Morales =

Filipino lawn bowler

Personal information
- Nationality: Filipino
Medal record
Representing (Philippines)
Asia Pacific Bowls Championships
Bronze medal – third place	2009 Kuala Lumpur	fours
Southeast Asian Games
Gold medal – first place	2019 Philippines	pairs

Angelo Atoip Morales is a Filipino international lawn bowler.

== Bowls career ==
Morales won a fours bronze medal (with Christopher Dagpin, Leo Carreon and Ronald Lising) at the 2009 Asia Pacific Bowls Championships, held in Kuala Lumpur.

Morales was selected as part of the five man team by the Philippines for the 2012 World Outdoor Bowls Championship, which was held in Adelaide, Australia. In 2014, he won the Hong Kong International Bowls Classic pairs title with Christopher Dagpin and finished runner-up in the same event in 2018.

He won a gold medal in the pairs at the Lawn bowls at the 2019 Southeast Asian Games.
