= Colin Silberstein =

Israeli lawn bowler

Personal information
- Native name: קולין זילברשטיין
- Nationality: Israeli
Medal record
Representing (Israel)
Atlantic Bowls Championships
Bronze medal – third place	2011 Cyprus	fours

Colin Silberstein (Hebrew: קולין זילברשטיין) is an Israeli international lawn bowler.

== Bowls career ==
Silberstein was selected as part of the five man team by Israel for the 2012 World Outdoor Bowls Championship in Adelaide, Australia.

He won a fours bronze medal (with Yair Bekier, Roi Ben-Ari and Allan Saitowitz) at the 2011 Atlantic Bowls Championships.
