= Matt Gallop =

Personal information
- Nationality: New Zealand
- Born: 10 November 1987 (age 38) Blenheim, New Zealand

Sport
- Sport: Lawn bowls
- Club: Blenheim BC; Cabramatta BC
Medal record
Representing New Zealand
World Outdoor Championships
Bronze medal – third place	2012 Adelaide	Men's triples

Matt Gallop (born 10 November 1987) is a New Zealand international lawn and indoor bowler.

== Bowls career ==
Gallop from Blenheim, in New Zealand won a bronze medal in the triples at the 2012 World Outdoor Bowls Championship in Adelaide.

He won the 2012/13 pairs title and 2010/11 fours title at the New Zealand National Bowls Championships when bowling for the Blenheim and Cabramatta Bowls Clubs respectively.
