= Lisa White (bowls) =

Personal information
- Nationality: New Zealander

Achievements and titles
- Highest world ranking: 25 (December 2024)
Medal record
Representing New Zealand
World Outdoor Championships
Silver medal – second place	2012 Adelaide	Women's triples
Silver medal – second place	2012 Adelaide	Women's team

Lisa White is a New Zealand international lawn and indoor bowler. She reached a career high ranking of world number 25 in December 2024.

White who plays for Raumati Bowling Club in Wellington, New Zealand, won a silver medal in the triples at the 2012 World Outdoor Bowls Championship in Adelaide.
