= Bobby Donnelly (bowls) =

South African lawn bowler

Personal information
- Nationality: South African
- Born: 12 September 1962 (age 63) Boksburg, South Africa

Sport
- Sport: Lawn bowls
- Club: The Wanderers BC
Medal record
Representing South Africa
Men's lawn bowls
Commonwealth Games
Gold medal – first place	2002 Manchester	Men's singles
Gold medal – first place	2014 Glasgow	Men's triples
World Outdoor Championships
Silver medal – second place	2000 Johannesburg	Men's fours
Silver medal – second place	2012 Adelaide	Men's fours
Bronze medal – third place	2012 Adelaide	Men's team
Atlantic Bowls Championships
Gold medal – first place	2009 Johannesburg	triples
Gold medal – first place	2009 Johannesburg	fours
Gold medal – first place	2011 Paphos	pairs
Bronze medal – third place	2011 Paphos	singles

Robert 'Bobby' Donnelly (born 12 September 1962) is a South African lawn bowler.

== Bowls career ==
Donnelly secured a silver medal in the fours at the 2000 World Outdoor Bowls Championship before competing in the 2002 Commonwealth Games bowls singles after receiving a late call up as an injury replacement. He took a surprise gold medal defeating Jeremy Henry in the final.

In 2009 he won the triples and fours gold medals at the Atlantic Bowls Championships and two years later he won the pairs gold medal and singles bronze medal at the 2011 Atlantic Bowls Championships.

He won the 2013 singles at the National Championships bowling for the Wanderers Bowls Club.

A second Commonwealth Games gold came his way in the men's triples at the 2014 Commonwealth Games.

He was selected as part of the South Africa team for the 2018 Commonwealth Games on the Gold Coast in Queensland.
