= Shaun Addinall =

South African international lawn bowler

Personal information
- Nationality: South African
- Born: 27 September 1969 (age 56) South Africa

Sport
- Sport: Lawn bowls
Medal record
Representing South Africa
Men's lawn bowls
World Outdoor Championships
Silver medal – second place	2000 Johannesburg	pairs
Silver medal – second place	2000 Johannesburg	fours
Commonwealth Games
Bronze medal – third place	2002 Manchester	Men's pairs
Gold medal – first place	2010 Delhi	Men's pairs

Shaun Christopher Addinall (born 27 September 1969) is a South African international lawn bowler.

Addinall won a bronze medal in the pairs with bowls partner Gerry Baker at the 2002 Commonwealth Games. He competed in the 2006 Commonwealth Games before winning a gold medal with Baker in the 2010 Commonwealth Games – Men's pairs.
