= Russell Meyer =

New Zealand international lawn bowler

Personal information
- Born: 1 May 1972 (age 54)

Sport
- Country: New Zealand
- Sport: Lawn bowls
- Club: Cabramatta BC
Medal record
Representing New Zealand
World Outdoor Championships
Bronze medal – third place	2000 Johannesburg	pairs
Bronze medal – third place	2000 Johannesburg	fours
Bronze medal – third place	2000 Johannesburg	team
Bronze medal – third place	2004 Ayr	singles
Silver medal – second place	2004 Ayr	team
Gold medal – first place	2008 Christchurch	pairs
Gold medal – first place	2008 Christchurch	fours
Gold medal – first place	2008 Christchurch	team
Asia Pacific Bowls Championships
Gold medal – first place	1997 Warilla	triples
Gold medal – first place	1997 Warilla	fours
Gold medal – first place	2001 Melbourne	pairs
Bronze medal – third place	2001 Melbourne	fours
Gold medal – first place	2003 Brisbane	singles

Russell Meyer (born 1972) is a former New Zealand international lawn bowler.

== Bowls career ==
In 2000 he won a pairs bronze medal with Paul Girdler at the 2000 World Outdoor Bowls Championship in Johannesburg and four years later won another bronze medal in the singles at the 2004 World Outdoor Bowls Championship in Ayr. In 2002, he won the Hong Kong International Bowls Classic pairs title with Paul Girdler.

In 2008 he won double gold winning both the pairs and fours at the 2008 World Outdoor Bowls Championship in Christchurch.

He won five medals at the Asia Pacific Bowls Championships, four of which were gold medals.

He won the 2008 singles title and 1998 pairs title at the New Zealand National Bowls Championships when bowling for the Cabramatta & Northern Bowls Clubs respectively.
