= Michel Larue =

Canadian lawn bowler

Personal information
- Nationality: Canadian
- Born: 26 November 1966 (age 59)
Medal record
Representing (Canada)
Asia Pacific Bowls Championships
Gold medal – first place	2003 Brisbane	pairs
Bronze medal – third place	2003 Brisbane	fours

Michel Larue (born 1966) is a former Canadian international lawn bowler.

== Bowls career ==
Larue has represented Canada at two Commonwealth Games; at the 2006 Commonwealth Games and the 2010 Commonwealth Games.

He won two medals at the 2003 Asia Pacific Bowls Championships including a gold medal in the pairs, with Keith Roney at Pine Rivers Memorial BC, in Brisbane, Australia.

He won a Canadian National title in 2010.
