= Wayne Hogg =

Scottish bowler

Personal information
- Nationality: Scottish
- Born: 24 September 1980 (age 46)

Sport
- Club: Markinch BC
Medal record
Representing Scotland
World Outdoor Championships
Gold medal – first place	2008 Christchurch	Men's triples
British Isles Championships
Gold medal – first place	2014	triples

Wayne Hogg (born 24 September 1980) is a Scottish international indoor and lawn bowler.

== Bowls career ==
In 2008 he won the gold medal in the triples at the 2008 World Outdoor Bowls Championship in Christchurch along with David Peacock and Willie Wood.

He then won the 2008 Scottish National Bowls Championships singles title qualifying for the 2009 World Singles Champion of Champions event, where he won the silver medal losing to Brett Wilkie of Australia in the final.

In addition to his singles title he also won the Scottish National Bowls Championships triples title in 2013.
