= Mohd Amir Mohd Yusof =

Malaysian international lawn bowler (born 1983)

Personal information
- Nationality: Malaysian
- Born: 7 September 1983 (age 42)

Sport
- Sport: Lawn bowls
Medal record
Representing Malaysia
World Outdoor Championships
Bronze medal – third place	2008 Christchurch	triples
Bronze medal – third place	2008 Christchurch	team
Asia Pacific Bowls Championships
Bronze medal – third place	2007 Christchurch	triples
Bronze medal – third place	2009 Kuala Lumpur	triples
Gold medal – first place	2009 Kuala Lumpur	fours
Southeast Asian Games
Gold medal – first place	2007 Nakhon Ratchasima	pairs
Gold medal – first place	2017 Kuala Lumpur	triples

Mohd Amir Mohd Yusof is a Malaysian international lawn bowler.

== Bowls career ==
Ariffin won the bronze medal in the triples with Azim Azami Ariffin and Azwan Shuhaimi at the 2008 World Outdoor Bowls Championship in Christchurch.

He won three medals at the Asia Pacific Bowls Championships, including the 2009 fours gold medal, in the singles, in Kuala Lumpur and two gold medals in bowls events at the Southeast Asian Games.
