= Michelle Cooper (bowls) =

Scottish international bowls player (born 1986)

Personal information
- Nationality: British (Scottish)
- Born: 8 June 1986 (age 40)
Medal record
Representing Scotland
Lawn Bowls
World Outdoor Championships
Gold medal – first place	2012 Adelaide	Women's fours
Bronze medal – third place	2012 Adelaide	Women's triples
Bronze medal – third place	2012 Adelaide	Women's team

Michelle Cooper (born 8 June 1986) is a Scottish international bowls player who won a gold medal at the 2012 World Outdoor Bowls Championship. Cooper won the World U25 Mixed Pairs Championship at Gedling Indoor Bowling Club in Nottingham in 2010.

== Personal life ==
Cooper is from Kilwinning in North Ayrshire. Her parents are Alexander and Maureen.

In November 2016, Cooper was jailed for 8 months after admitting to stealing £61,000 from her parents' bank account because of a gambling addiction.
