= Richard Girvan =

New Zealand lawn bowler

Personal information
- Full name: Richard Anthony Girvan
- Nationality: New Zealander
- Born: 30 December 1973 (age 52) Auckland

Sport
- Sport: Lawn bowls
- Club: Nelson Bay BC; Onehunga BC

Achievements and titles
- National finals: NZ Fours winner 2005, 2015, 2017
Medal record
Representing New Zealand
World Outdoor Championships
Gold medal – first place	2008 Christchurch	Men's fours
Gold medal – first place	2008 Christchurch	Men's team
Asia Pacific Bowls Championships
Gold medal – first place	2005 Melbourne	triples
Silver medal – second place	2007 Christchurch	fours
Gold medal – first place	2011 Adelaide	pairs
Silver medal – second place	2011 Adelaide	fours

Richard Anthony Girvan (born 30 December 1973) in Auckland is a New Zealand international lawn bowler.

== Bowls career ==
In 2008 he won the gold medal in the fours at the 2008 World Outdoor Bowls Championship in Christchurch along with Gary Lawson, Russell Meyer and Andrew Todd.

Girvan represented New Zealand at the 2006 Commonwealth Games 2010 Commonwealth Games and the 2014 Commonwealth Games.

He won four medals at the Asia Pacific Bowls Championships, of which two have been gold medals.

He won the 2005, 2014/15 and 2016/17 fours title at the New Zealand National Bowls Championships when bowling for the Taren Point and Onehunga Bowls Clubs respectively.
