= David Peacock (bowls) =

British lawn bowler

Personal information
- Born: 30 January 1970 (age 56) Edinburgh, Scotland

Sport
- Club: Danderhall BC (Outdoor); Midlothian IBC (Indoor)
Medal record
Representing Scotland
World Outdoor Championships
Gold medal – first place	2004 Ayr	Men's triples
Gold medal – first place	2004 Ayr	Men's team
Gold medal – first place	2008 Christchurch	Men's triples
Gold medal – first place	2012 Adelaide	Men's triples
Bronze medal – third place	2012 Adelaide	Men's fours
Silver medal – second place	2012 Adelaide	Men's team
Commonwealth Games
Gold medal – first place	2014 Glasgow	Men's fours
Atlantic Bowls Championships
Bronze medal – third place	2011 Paphos	pairs

David Craig Peacock (born 30 January 1970) is a Scottish international lawn and indoor bowler.

== Bowls career ==
Peacock won the 2002 Hong Kong International Bowls Classic singles title.

He claimed the triples gold medal at the 2004 World Outdoor Bowls Championship with Jim McIntyre and Willie Wood. Four years later he repeated the success when winning the triples at the 2008 World Outdoor Bowls Championship with Wayne Hogg and Willie Wood.

In 2011 he won the pairs bronze medal at the Atlantic Bowls Championships. The following year he won his third World Championship gold in the triples at the 2012 World Outdoor Bowls Championship with Graeme Archer and Darren Burnett, he also won a fours bronze medal.

He competed for Scotland in the men's fours at the 2014 Commonwealth Games where he won a gold medal.
