= Azim Azami Ariffin =

Malaysian international lawn bowler

Personal information
- Nationality: Malaysian
- Born: 3 April 1985 (age 41)

Sport
- Sport: Lawn bowls
Medal record
Representing Malaysia
World Outdoor Championships
Bronze medal – third place	2008 Christchurch	triples
Bronze medal – third place	2008 Christchurch	team
Asia Pacific Bowls Championships
Gold medal – first place	2009 Kuala Lumpur	fours
Bronze medal – third place	2009 Kuala Lumpur	triples
Southeast Asian Games
Gold medal – first place	2007 Nakhon Ratchasima	pairs

Azim Azami Mohd Ariffin is a Malaysian international lawn bowler.

== Bowls career ==
Ariffin won the bronze medal in the triples with Mohd Amir Mohd Yusof and Azwan Shuhaimi at the 2008 World Outdoor Bowls Championship in Christchurch.

He won a fours gold medal and a triples bronze medal at the 2009 Asia Pacific Bowls Championships in Kuala Lumpur and in 2007, he won the gold medal in the pairs event at the 2007 Southeast Asian Games in Nakhon Ratchasima.
