= Clinton Roets =

South African international lawn bowler

Personal information
- Nationality: South African

Sport
- Sport: Lawn bowls
Medal record
Representing South Africa
World Outdoor Championships
Bronze medal – third place	2008 Christchurch	Men's fours
Silver medal – second place	2012 Adelaide	Men's fours
Bronze medal – third place	2012 Adelaide	Men's team
Atlantic Bowls Championships
Gold medal – first place	2007 Ayr	fours
Bronze medal – third place	2011 Paphos	triples

Clinton Roets is a South African international lawn bowler.

Roets won the bronze medal in the fours with Billy Radloff and Brian Dixon and Wayne Perry at the 2008 World Outdoor Bowls Championship in Christchurch.

In 2007 he won the fours gold medal at the Atlantic Bowls Championships and in 2011 he won the triples bronze medal at the Atlantic Bowls Championships.

He won a silver medal in the Men's Fours at the 2012 World Outdoor Bowls Championship in Adelaide.
