= Stuart Airey (bowls) =

British lawn bowler

Personal information
- Nationality: British (English)
- Born: 4 October 1971 (age 54) Sunderland, England

Sport
- Country: England
- Sport: Lawn bowls
Medal record
Representing England
Men's Lawn bowls
Commonwealth Games
Silver medal – second place	2010 Delhi	Men's pairs
Silver medal – second place	2014 Glasgow	Men's fours
Atlantic Bowls Championships
Silver medal – second place	2009 Johannesburg	Men's triples
Silver medal – second place	2009 Johannesburg	Men's fours
British Isles Championships
Gold medal – first place	2008	fours

Stuart Airey (born 4 October 1971) is an English international lawn bowler.

== Bowls career ==
Airey was an England junior international and was the winner of the English U25 indoor singles in 1995.

In 1997 & 1998, he won the Hong Kong International Bowls Classic pairs titles with Andrew Wills.

In 2009 he won the triples and fours silver medals at the Atlantic Bowls Championships.

He competed for England in the 2010 Commonwealth Games Men's pairs winning a silver medal with Mervyn King and four years later he won another silver medal in the men's fours at the 2014 Commonwealth Games.
