= Azwan Shuhaimi =

Malaysian international lawn bowler (born 1986)

Personal information
- Nationality: Malaysian
- Born: 17 September 1986 (age 39)

Sport
- Sport: Lawn bowls
- Club: Selangor
Medal record
Representing Malaysia
World Outdoor Championships
Bronze medal – third place	2008 Christchurch	triples
Bronze medal – third place	2008 Christchurch	team
Asia Pacific Bowls Championships
Bronze medal – third place	2007 Christchurch	triples
Gold medal – first place	2009 Kuala Lumpur	fours
Bronze medal – third place	2009 Kuala Lumpur	triples
Bronze medal – third place	2011 Adelaide	fours
Southeast Asian Games
Gold medal – first place	2007 Nakhon Ratchasima	triples

Afrizal Azwan Shuhaimi is a Malaysian international lawn bowler.

== Bowls career ==
Shuhaimi won the bronze medal in the triples with Mohd Amir Mohd Yusof and Azim Azami Ariffin at the 2008 World Outdoor Bowls Championship in Christchurch.

He has won four medals at the Asia Pacific Bowls Championships, which includes a gold medal in the fours with (Fairul Izwan Abd Muin, Mohd Amir Mohd Yusof and Azim Azami Ariffin), at the 2009 Championships held in his own country. In 2007, he also won the gold medal in the triples event at the 2007 Southeast Asian Games in Nakhon Ratchasima.
