= Graeme Archer (bowls) =

Scottish lawn bowler

Personal information
- Nationality: Scottish
- Born: 1 February 1967 (age 59) Edinburgh, Scotland

Sport
- Club: Sighthill Edinburgh BC
Medal record
Representing Scotland
World Outdoor Championships
Gold medal – first place	2012 Adelaide	Men's triples
Bronze medal – third place	2012 Adelaide	Men's fours
Silver medal – second place	2012 Adelaide	Men's team
Atlantic Bowls Championships
Gold medal – first place	2011 Paphos	fours
Silver medal – second place	2011 Paphos	triples

Graeme Archer (born 1 February 1967) is a Scottish lawn bowler from Edinburgh.

== Bowls career ==
He was National champion in 1995.

In 2011 he won the fours gold medal and triples silver medal at the Atlantic Bowls Championships.

He won the lawn bowls gold medal in the triples competition at the 2012 World Outdoor Bowls Championship. In 2025, he married Andrea Blair.
