= Robert Newman (bowls) =

English international bowls player

Personal information
- Nationality: British (English)
- Born: 17 February 1975 (age 51)

Sport
- Club: Reading
Medal record
Representing England
World Outdoor Championships
Bronze medal – third place	2004 Ayr	triples
Bronze medal – third place	2004 Ayr	fours
Bronze medal – third place	2008 Christchurch	fours
Commonwealth Games
Bronze medal – third place	2010 Delhi	triples
Atlantic Bowls Championships
Silver medal – second place	2009 Johannesburg	fours
Bronze medal – third place	2015 Paphos	triples

Robert Newman (born 1975) is a former English international lawn and indoor bowls player.

== Bowls career ==
Newman was a junior international indoors and lost to Stuart Airey in the final of the 1995 English indoor singles championship.

Newman won three bronze medals in the World Bowls Championship. The first two in the triples and fours at the 2004 World Outdoor Bowls Championship in Ayr followed by another bronze in the fours at the 2008 World Outdoor Bowls Championship in Christchurch.

Newman also won a bronze medal at the lawn bowls competition at the 2010 Commonwealth Games. He announced his retirement in 2016.

He won two Men's National Championships in the triples (2003) and the fours (1993) bowling for Reading. He finished runner-up to Graham Shadwell in the 1999 national junior singles.

In 2009 he won the fours silver medal at the Atlantic Bowls Championships and in 2015 he won the triples bronze medal at the Championships. In 2010, he won the Hong Kong International Bowls Classic singles and pairs titles.
