= Wayne Perry (bowls) =

South African international lawn bowler (born 1982)

Personal information
- Nationality: South African
- Born: 11 February 1982 (age 44)

Sport
- Sport: Lawn bowls
- Club: Roosevelt BC
Medal record
Representing South Africa
Men's lawn bowls
Commonwealth Games
Gold medal – first place	2010 Delhi	Men's triples
World Outdoor Championships
Bronze medal – third place	2008 Christchurch	Men's fours
Atlantic Bowls Championships
Gold medal – first place	2009 Johannesburg	triples
Gold medal – first place	2009 Johannesburg	fours
Bronze medal – third place	2011 Paphos	triples

Wayne Perry is a South African international lawn bowler.

== Bowls career ==
In 2006, he won the Hong Kong International Bowls Classic pairs title with Neil Burkett. Two years later, Perry won the bronze medal in the fours with Clinton Roets and Brian Dixon and Billy Radloff at the 2008 World Outdoor Bowls Championship in Christchurch.

In 2009 he won the triples and fours gold medals at the Atlantic Bowls Championships.

He won a gold medal in the Men's triples at the 2010 Commonwealth Games.

In 2011 he won the triples bronze medal at the Atlantic Bowls Championships.
