= Mark Bantock =

English bowls player

Personal information
- Nationality: British (English)
- Born: 3 November 1969 (age 56) London, England

Sport
- Club: Gerrards Cross
Medal record
Men's Lawn bowls
Representing England
Commonwealth Games
Silver medal – second place	2006 Melbourne	Men's pairs
Bronze medal – third place	2010 Delhi	Men's Triples
World Outdoor Championships
Bronze medal – third place	2008 Christchurch	Men's fours
Atlantic Bowls Championships
Silver medal – second place	2009 Johannesburg	fours

Mark Tony Bantock is a former international bowls player from England.

== Biography ==
Bantock finished runner-up in the national junior singles in 1990.

Bantock was an England captain and won a silver medal in the Men's pairs at the 2006 Commonwealth Games and a bronze medal at the lawn bowls competition at the 2010 Commonwealth Games. In 2009 he won the fours silver medal at the Atlantic Bowls Championships.

He announced his retirement in 2012.
