= Mark Casey (bowls) =

Australian bowls player

Personal information
- Nationality: Australian
- Born: 30 January 1982 (age 44)

Sport
- Club: Deer Park
Medal record
Representing Australia
World Outdoor Championships
Silver medal – second place	2008 Christchurch	Men's fours
Silver medal – second place	2008 Christchurch	Men's team
Gold medal – first place	2012 Adelaide	Men's fours
Silver medal – second place	2012 Adelaide	Men's triples
Gold medal – first place	2012 Adelaide	Men's team
Silver medal – second place	2016 Christchurch	triples
Silver medal – second place	2016 Christchurch	fours
Silver medal – second place	2016 Christchurch	team
Commonwealth Games
Gold medal – first place	2006 Melbourne	Men's triples
Silver medal – second place	2010 Delhi	Men's triples
Asia Pacific Bowls Championships
Silver medal – second place	2005 Melbourne	pairs
Gold medal – first place	2007 Christchurch	triples
Gold medal – first place	2007 Christchurch	fours
Gold medal – first place	2011 Adelaide	fours
Silver medal – second place	2011 Adelaide	pairs
Bronze medal – third place	2015 Christchurch	triples
Silver medal – second place	2015 Christchurch	fours

Mark Casey (born 30 January 1982) is an international Australian lawn and indoor bowler.

== Bowls career ==
In 2005 he won the gold medal at the inaugural World Cup Singles in Hong Kong.

The following year in 2006 he won the gold medal in the triples competition at the 2006 Commonwealth Games in Melbourne. He won the lawn bowls gold medal in the fours competition at the 2012 World Outdoor Bowls Championship.

He won seven medals at the Asia Pacific Bowls Championships, of which three have been gold medals.

In 2016 he was part of the triples team with Aron Sherriff and Barrie Lester who won the silver medal at the 2016 World Outdoor Bowls Championship in Christchurch and won another silver medal in the fours.
