= 2012 World Outdoor Bowls Championship =

Bowls championship held in Adelaide, Australia

World Outdoor Championships 2012
- 12th World Outdoor Bowls Championships
- Location: Adelaide, Australia
- Date: 24 November - 9 December 2012.
- Category: World Bowls Championship

The 2012 World Outdoor Bowls Championship was held at the Lockleys Bowling Club in Adelaide, Australia, from 24 November to 9 December 2012.

Some of the qualifying rounds were held at the nearby Holdfast Bowling Club in Glenelg North.

Leif Selby won the men's singles Gold and the pairing of Alex Marshall and Paul Foster took the pairs Gold. Scotland also won the triples but Australia struck Gold in the fours and Leonard Trophy.

In the women's events Australia were dominant winning the singles won by Karen Murphy, pairs, triples and Taylor Trophy. Only the Scotland team managed to stop a complete clean sweep after claiming the fours.

== Medallists ==
Event	Gold	Silver	Bronze	Bronze
Men's singles	(Australia) Leif Selby	(Canada) Ryan Bester	(New Zealand) Shannon McIlroy	(South Africa) Gerry Baker
Men's pairs	(Scotland) Alex Marshall; Paul Foster	(Australia) Aron Sherriff; Leif Selby	(Canada) Ryan Bester; John Bezear	(England) Jamie Chestney; Graham Shadwell
Men's triples	(Scotland) Graeme Archer; Darren Burnett; David Peacock	(Australia) Mark Casey; Brett Wilkie; Wayne Ruediger	Neil Booth; James Talbot; Paul Daly	(New Zealand) Ali Forsyth; Matt Gallop; Tony Grantham
Men's fours	(Australia) Mark Casey; Brett Wilkie; Wayne Ruediger; Aron Sherriff	(South Africa) Gidion Vermeulen; Bobby Donnelly; Clinton Roets; Petrus Breitenbach	(Scotland) Alex Marshall; Graeme Archer; Darren Burnett; David Peacock	Neil Booth; James Talbot; Paul Daly; Ian McClure
Men's Team	Australia	Scotland	South Africa	N/A
Women's singles	(Australia) Karen Murphy	(New Zealand) Val Smith	(Canada) Kelly McKerihen	(England) Natalie Melmore
Women's pairs	(Australia) Rebecca Quail; Kelsey Cottrell	(New Zealand) Jo Edwards; Val Smith	(Philippines) Ainie Knight; Milagros Witheridge	(Scotland) Margaret Letham; Claire Johnston
Women's triples	(Australia) Karen Murphy; Lynsey Armitage; Natasha Van Eldik	(New Zealand) Mandy Boyd; Jan Khan; Lisa White	(Scotland) Lynn Stein; Caroline Brown; Michelle Cooper	(Wales) Kathy Pearce; Caroline Taylor; Lisa Forey
Women's fours	(Scotland) Margaret Letham; Caroline Brown; Lynn Stein; Michelle Cooper	(Malaysia) Auni Fathiah Kamis; Nur Fidrah Noh; Zuraini Khalid; Azlina Arshad	(Wales) Anwen Butten; Kathy Pearce; Hannah Smith; Lisa Forey	(South Africa) Colleen Piketh; Susan Nel; Santjie Steyn; Esme Steyn
Women's Team	Australia	New Zealand	Scotland	N/A

== Results ==
=== W.M.Leonard Trophy ===
Pos	Team	singles	pairs	triples	fours	Total
1	Australia	24+3	23+2	23+2	24+3	104
2	Scotland	20	24+3	24+3	21+1	96
3	South Africa	21+1	16	18	23+2	81
4	New Zealand	22+1	17	22+1	17	80
5	Canada	23+2	22+1	11	18	77
6	Ireland	12	19	21+1	22+1	76
7	Wales	16	20	14	20	70
8	England	15	21+1	12	19	68
9	Jersey	19	15	17	12	63
10	Malaysia	17	13	16	16	62
11	Namibia	6	18	13	14	51
12	China	8	14	19	8	49
13	Japan	18	1	20	6	45
14	Philippines	10	8	15	10	43
15	Hong Kong	13	4	10	13	40
16	Fiji	14	9	8	7	38
17	United States	7	10	5	15	37
18	Zimbabwe	4	11	9	11	35
19	Spain	9	6	2	9	26
20	Israel	11	3	7	5	26
21	Brazil	2	12	1	2	17
22	Botswana	1	7	6	3	17
23	Thailand	5	5	3	1	14
24	Brunei	3	2	4	4	13

=== Taylor Trophy ===
Pos	Player	singles	pairs	triples	fours	Total
1	Australia	24+3	24+3	24+3	16	97
2	New Zealand	23+2	23+2	23+2	18	93
3	Scotland	14	21+1	22+1	24+3	86
4	England	22+1	20	18	20	81
5	South Africa	20	18	19	21+1	79
6	Wales	13	19	21+1	22+1	77
7	Malaysia	12	14	16	23+2	67
8	Philippines	7	22+1	15	19	64
9	Israel	15	13	14	13	55
10	Hong Kong China	17	11	20	6	54
11	Netherlands	10	15	9	15	49
12	Canada	21+1	4	17	5	48
13	Ireland	19	12	7	8	46
14	Spain	5	17	11	9	42
15	Jersey	4	16	12	10	42
16	Fiji	2	9	10	17	38
17	Cyprus	6	10	8	12	36
18	Norfolk Island	18	8	5	3	34
19	Brunei	16	5	2	11	34
20	Thailand	11	2	13	4	30
21	United States	3	6	4	14	27
22	Japan	8	3	6	2	19
23	China	9	7	1	1	19
24	Botswana	1	1	3	7	12
