= Northern Ireland at the 1994 Commonwealth Games =

Northern Ireland at the 2002 Commonwealth Games
- CGF code: NIR
- CGA: Northern Ireland Commonwealth Games Council
- Website: nicgc.org

in Victoria, British Columbia, Canada
- Flag bearers: Opening: Closing:
- Medals Ranked 10th: Gold 5 Silver 2 Bronze 3 Total 10

Commonwealth Games appearances (overview)
- 1934; 1938; 1950; 1954; 1958; 1962; 1966; 1970; 1974; 1978; 1982; 1986; 1990; 1994; 1998; 2002; 2006; 2010; 2014; 2018; 2022; 2026; 2030

Other related appearances
- Ireland (1930)

Northern Ireland competed at the 1994 Commonwealth Games in Victoria, British Columbia, Canada, from 18 to 28 August 1994.

Northern Ireland finished 10th in the medal table with five gold medals, two silver medals and three bronze medals.

The Northern Irish team was named during June 1994.

== Medallists ==
=== Gold ===
- David Calvert (shooting)
- Margaret Johnston (lawn bowls)
- Neil Sinclair (boxing)
- Jimmy Webb (boxing)
- Men's trap pairs (shooting)

=== Silver ===
- Martin Renaghan (boxing)
- Mark Winters (boxing)

=== Bronze ===
- Men's pairs (lawn bowls)
- Men's fours (lawn bowls)
- Men's fullbore rifle pairs (shooting)

== Team ==
=== Athletics ===
Men

Athlete	Events	Club	Medals
Jim Campbell	5000m, 10,000m		
Dermot Donnelly	5000m, 10,000m		
Gary Lough	1500m		
Paul McBurney	200, 400m		
Michael John Joseph McDonald	triple jump		
Brian Francis Treacy	1500m		
Davy Wilson	800m, 1500m		

Women

Athlete	Events	Club	Medals
Joanna Margaret Latimer	800m		
Stephanie Llewellyn	400m, 400m hurdles		
Stephanie Anne McCann	400m, 400m hurdles		
Jackie McKernan	discus throw, shot put		

=== Badminton ===
Men

Athlete	Events	Club	Medals
Graham Henderson	singles, doubles, mixed	Alpha BC, Lisburn	
Bruce Topping	singles, doubles, mixed	Alpha BC, Lisburn	
Michael Watt	singles, mixed	Alpha BC, Lisburn	

Women

Athlete	Events	Club	Medals
Jayne Plunkett	singles, doubles, mixed	Alpha BC, Lisburn	
Claire Russell	singles, doubles, mixed	Alpha BC, Lisburn	
Ann Stephens	mixed	Alpha BC, Lisburn	

=== Boxing ===
Athlete	Events	Club	Medals
Paul Douglas	91kg heavyweight		
Damaen Kelly	51kg flyweight		
Stephen Kirk	81kg light-heavyweight		
Colin Moffett	-48kg light-flyweight		
Adrian Patterson	57kg featherweight		
Danny Ryan	75kg middleweight		
Martin Renaghan	60kg lightweight	Keady ABC, Armagh	Silver medal
Neil Sinclair	67kg welterweight		Gold medal
Tommy Waite	54kg bantamweight		
Jim Webb	71kg light-middleweight	Holy Trinity ABC, Belfast	Gold medal
Mark Winters	63.5kg light-welterweight		Silver medal

=== Cycling ===
Men

Athlete	Events	Club	Medals
Ian Chivers	road race		
Tommy Evans	road race, scratch, points		
Conor Henry	road race		
Alastair Irvine	scratch, points		
Mark Kane	road race, time trial		
Cormac McCann	team time trial		
David McCann	team time trial		
John McClelland	scratch, points, team time trial		
Andrew Moss	pursuit, team time trial		

=== Gymnastics ===
Men

Athlete	Events	Club	Medals
Colin Close	all-round, parallel, pommel, rings		
Nicholas Dunn	all-round		

Women

Athlete	Events	Club	Medals
Fiona Burgess	team		
Sonya Cairns	all-round, team		
Jenny Dwyer	all-round, team		
Helen McGarry	rhythmic		
Kerry Rutledge	rhythmic		

=== Lawn bowls ===
Men

Athlete	Events	Club	Medals
Stephen Adamson	pairs	Dunbarton BC	Bronze medal
Sammy Allen	pairs	Cliftonville BC	Bronze medal
Victor Dallas	fours	Coleraine BC	Bronze medal
Noel Graham	fours	Lisnagarvey BC	Bronze medal
Ian McClure	fours	Portrush BC	Bronze medal
John McCloughlin	fours	Lisnagarvey BC	Bronze medal
Jackie Smyth	singles	Magherafelt BC	

Women

Athlete	Events	Club	Medals
Barbara Cameron	pairs	Ballymena BC	
Freda Elliott	pairs	Knock BC	
Margaret Johnston	singles	Ballymoney BC	Gold medal

=== Shooting ===
Men

Athlete	Events	Medals
Thomas Allen	trap, trap pairs	Gold medal
Donald Baker	rifle 3pos, prone, 3pos pair	
David Calvert	fullbore rifle, fullbore rifle pairs	,
Robert Clarke	air rifle, pair	
Tom Hewitt	trap, trap pairs	Gold medal
Mervyn McFarland	air pistol	
Martin Millar	fullbore rifle, fullbore rifle pairs	Bronze medal
Cliff Ogle	rifle 3pos, prone, 3pos pair, air rifle pair	

=== Swimming ===
Men

Athlete	Events	Club	Medals
Richard Gheel	100, 200m backstroke		
Gareth Walker	100m butterfly, 50, 100 free		

Women

Athlete	Events	Club	Medals
Sharlene Brown	200m breaststroke		
Marion Madine	100, 200m butterfly, 200 free		
Emma Robinson	100, 200m breaststroke, 50 free		
Diane Simms	200, 400, 800m freestyle		

=== Weightlifting ===
Athlete	Events	Club	Medals
Eamon Byrne	64kg		
Brendan Cooke	70kg		

=== Wrestling ===
Athlete	Events	Club	Medals
Mark Bowman	68kg		
John O'Rawe	62kg		
