= Irish National Bowls Championships =

Lawn bowls competitions

Tournament information
- Sport: Lawn bowls
- Location: Ireland
- Established: 1908
- Administrator: IBA / IWBA
- Website: Irish Bowling Association

The Irish National Bowls Championships combines Northern Ireland and the Republic of Ireland. Traditionally, the game was played mainly in Northern Ireland, but the Kenilworth Bowling Club of Dublin joined the Irish Bowls Association in 1906, which prompted the merger into one team. With the exception of the Commonwealth Games, players continue to represent a combined Ireland team at all major international championships.

== History ==
The singles championship is called the Dr Rusk Cup named after Dr John Rusk, President of the IBA and the singles representative player at the Lawn Bowls at the 1934 British Empire Games. The Pairs is called the T.W McMullan Cup, the Triples is known as the Charlie Clawson Cup and the Fours is known as the C.L MacKean Cup. Roy Fulton is a record seven times singles champion closely followed by Martin McHugh with six wins.

The Women's National Championships were inaugurated in 1947 but only consisted of the pairs and fours initially.

The national champions are determined by the winners of the Irish Bowling Association Championships. To qualify for the Championships, bowlers must win their respective championship. The four qualifying tournaments are held by the Northern Ireland Private Greens League (NIPGL/NIWPGL), the Northern Ireland Bowling Association (NIBA/NIWBA), the Bowling League of Ireland (BLI/LBLI) and the Northern Ireland Provincial Bowling Association (NIPBA/PTWBA).

The 2020 and women's 2021 Championships were cancelled due to the COVID-19 pandemic. The 2023 event clashed with the 2023 World Outdoor Bowls Championship, which denied the chance for several leading bowlers to either defend or regain titles.

== Past winners ==
=== Men's singles ===
Year	Champion	Runner-Up	Ref
1908	R. Archer (Ormeau)	John Lindsay (Belmont)	
1909	D. W. Barnett (Belmont)	T. H. Forsythe (Shaftesbury)	
1910	A. Cherry (Ormeau)	R. Stead (Ballynafeigh)	
1911	James Coulter (Ormeau)	W. R. Forsythe (Shaftesbury)	
1912	R. Archer (Ormeau) & George Cooper (Kenilworth)+	joint winners declared	
1913	George Cooper (Kenilworth)	F. McCartney (Belmont)	
1914	W. McLetchie (Bangor)	S. S. Mercer (Shaftesbury)	
1915	James Coulter (Ormeau)	J. McCann (Falls)	
1916	George Cooper (Kenilworth)	Tom McCrea (Falls)	
1917	Sam Windrum (Shaftesbury)	S. J. Thompson (Ulster)	
1918	William Dougal (North Belfast)	Walter Scott (Cavehill)	
1919	J. B. Teuton (Shaftesbury)	R. R. Thomson (Kenilworth)	
1920	W. R. Forsythe (Ulster)	Leslie Lewis (Kenilworth)	
1921	S. Boyd (North Belfast)	George Cooper (Kenilworth)	
1922	J. B. Teuton (Shaftesbury)	S. Arthurs (Woodvale)	
1923	James Fitzpatrick (Falls)	Charles Park (Ormo Bakery)	
1924	D. W. Barnett (Belmont)	J. K. Dunlop (Falls)	
1925	Tom Kearney (Larne)	Harry King (Castleton)	
1926	Charles Park (Ormo Bakery)	Tom Kearney (Larne)	
1927	Tom McCrea (Ulster)	Harry King (Castleton)	
1928	John Park (Forth River)	J. Baker (Woodvale)	
1929	John Park (Forth River)	J. Baker (North Belfast)	
1930	J. Landon (Castleton)	Fred Wright (Alexandra)	
1931	George Cooper (Kenilworth)	T. Topping (Cavehill)	
1932	Dr John Rusk (Cavehill)	Thomas B. Molyneaux (Ballynafeigh)	
1933	Percy Watson (Cavehill)	John Park (Woodvale)	
1934	John Park (Forth River)	James Fitzpatrick (Falls)	
1935	Thomas B. Molyneaux (Ballynafeigh)	John Downing (Shatfesbury)	
1936	W. Brown (Knock)	J. Wilkin (Alexandra)	
1937	A. B. MacLaughlin (Alexandra)	Syd Thompson (Musgrave)	
1938	Percy Watson (Cavehill)	H. McCutcheon (Divis)	
1939	Joe Baker (Forth River)	W. J. Thompson (Belfast)	
1940	Joe Baker (Forth River)	W. L. Bowie (St. James's Gate)	
1941-1945 not held
1946	Barry Fitzmaurice (Cliftonville)	S. J. Dixon (St. James's Gate)	
1947	William Barr (Londonderry)	H. Whiteside (Castleton)	
1948	F.J. Wright (Cliftonville)	Albert Cameron (Kenilworth)	
1949	Bob Miller (Bangor)	W. McClean (Ballymoney)	
1950	Syd Thompson (Willowfield)	R. McKillen (Portrush)	
1951	Garth Anderson (Coleraine)	Raymond Fisher (Ormeau)	
1952	Tom Henry (Londonderry)	Pat McCarragher (Divis)	
1953	Walter Christie (Victoria)	Percy Watson (Cavehill)	
1954	Sammy Park (Cliftonville)	George McFadden (Woodvale)	
1955	Jack Webb (Musgrave)	Pat McGuirk (Leinster)	
1956	Roy Fulton (Coleraine)	Pat McGuirk (Leinster)	
1957	Roy Fulton (Coleraine)	Willie Byme (Herbert Park. Dublin)	
1958	Jack Webb (Musgrave)	Syd Thompson (Willowfield)	
1959	Jimmy Connolly (Leinster)	J. Hill (Derry)	
1960	Jim Hood (Cavehill)	Syd Thompson (Willowfield)	
1961	Tom Kennedy (Lisnagarvey)	Andy Smith (Falls)	
1962	Roy Fulton (Coleraine)	Con McCarthy (Dublin)	
1963	Billy Tate (Bangor)	Pat McGuirk (Leinster)	
1964	Roy Fulton (Coleraine)	Bertie McConnell (Belmont)	
1965	Roy Fulton (Coleraine)	Danny Laverty (Woodvale)	
1966	Davy McEnaney (Leinster)	Harry Brown (Limavady)	
1967	Roy Fulton (Coleraine)	Sammy Millar (Windsor)	
1968	Tom Sutton (Cavehill)	Pat McGuirk (Leinster)	
1969	John Higgins (York Road)	Pat McGuirk (Leinster)	
1970	Danny Laverty (Woodvale)	Willie Murray (Portrush)	
1971	Roy Fulton (Coleraine)	Billy Crothers (Ewarts)	
1972	David Marchant (Leinster)	Billy Pimley (Falls)	
1973	Billy Curragh (Ards)	Don Mellor (Leinster)	
1974	Sammy Ashwood (Balmoral)	North McQuay (Knock)	
1975	Willie Murray (Portrush)	Alan Eager (Kenilworth)	
1976	Hugh Wallace (Carrickfergus)	John Henry (Ballymoney)	
1977	Dennis Darcy (Crumlin)	North McQuay (Knock)	
1978	Marcus Craig (Cliftonville)	Frank Daly (Crumlin)	
1979	Sammy Allen (Ballymena)	Chris Wallace (Carrickfergus)	
1980	David Corkill (Knock)	Tommy Catherwood (Cookstown)	
1981	Billy Loughrey (Portrush)	Tom Sutton (Cavehill)	
1982	Paul McVeigh (Falls)	Ken Hogg (Ballymoney)	
1983	Gordon Woods (Ballymoney)	Sammy Allen (Ballymena)	
1984	Ian Gillen (Blackrock)	Ivan Craig (Rathfriland)	
1985	Morrow Horner (Belmont)	John Higgins (York Road)	
1986	Ken Hogg (Cookstown)	Alan Geary (Blackrock)	
1987	Alan McMullan (Balmoral)	Michael Geary (Leinster)	
1988	David Corkill (Knock)	Don McArthur (Limavady)	
1989	Jim Baker (Cliftonville)	Tom Turkington (Balmoral)	
1990	Stephen Adamson (Dunbarton)	Willie Smyth (Magherafelt)	
1991	John Nolan (Blackrock)	Noel Graham (Lisnagarvey)	
1992	Alex Lightbody (Bangor)	Gary McCloy (Portrush)	
1993	Colin Best (Willowfield)	Noel Weir (Rathfriland)	
1994	Gary McCloy (Portrush)	Andrew Whisker (Saintfield)	
1995	Noel Graham (Lisnagarvey)	John Nolan (Blackrock)	
1996	Jeremy Henry (Portrush)	Michael Dunlop (Ormeau)	
1997	Greg Moore (Banbridge)	James Talbot (Old Bleach)	
1998	Clifford Craig (Bangor)	James Talbot (Old Bleach)	
1999	John Murphy (Crumlin)	James McKenny (Dromore)	
2000	Ian Ross (Brookgreen)	Jonathan Ross (Lisnagarvey)	
2001	Jeremy Henry (Portrush)	Martin McHugh (Whitehead)	
2002	Myles Greenfield (Dunbarton)	Noel Graham (Lisnagarvey)	
2003	Martin McHugh (Whitehead)	Blair Somers (Blackrock)	
2004	Martin McHugh (Whitehead)	John Leonard (St. James's Gate)	
2005	Martin McHugh (Whitehead)	Wilfie Moore (Limavady)	
2006	Martin McHugh (Whitehead)	Adam Barr (Limavady)	
2007	Gary Kelly (Ballymoney)	Stephen Millane (St. James's Gate)	
2008	Ian McClure (Portrush)	Tony Budde (Belmont)	
2009	Gerard McGleave (Divis)	Thomas Smyth (Leinster)	
2010	Richard Leonard (St. James's Gate)	Graham McKee (Bangor)	
2011	Paul Daly (Ulster Transport)	James Martin (Ballymoney)	
2012	Ian McClure (Portrush)	Gerard McCleave (Divis)	
2013	Martin McHugh (Whitehead)	Ian McClure (Portrush)	
2014	Neil Mulholland (Lisnagarvey)	Ian McClure (Portrush)	
2015	Martin McHugh (Whitehead)	Peter Convery (Dunbarton)	
2016	Barry Kane (Dunluce)	Mark McPeak (Belmont)	
2017	Mark Wilson (Cookstown)	Noel Graham (Lisnagarvey)	
2018	Stephen Coleman (Ballymena)	Gary McCloy (Portrush)	
2019	Gary McCloy (Portrush)	Aaran O'Keefe (Banbridge)	
2020 cancelled due to COVID-19 pandemic			
2021	Simon Martin (Belmont)	Aaran O'Keefe (Banbridge)	
2022	Adam McKeown (Old Bleach)	Jackie Erskine (Bangor)	
2023	Ross McMullan (Limavady)	Ian Wilson (CYM)	
2024	David Copeland (Dunbarton)	Kyle Blakely (Banbridge)	
2025	Richie Leonard (Crumlin)	Ryan McElroy (Dunbarton)	

+ Shared title due to final not being played.

==== Most titles ====
Name	Titles	Year
Roy Fulton	7	1956, 1957 1962, 1964, 1965, 1967, 1971
Martin McHugh	6	2003, 2004, 2005, 2006, 2013, 2015
George Cooper	4	1912, 1913, 1916, 1931
John Park	3	1928, 1929, 1933

=== Men's pairs ===
Year	Champion	Runner-Up	Ref
1923	Bobbie Campbell & Dr John Rusk (Cavehill)	J. Govan & F. McCartney (Belmont)	
1924	S. Craig & Tom Kearney (Larne)	Fred Bestall & George Cooper (Kenilworth)	
1925	J. McPartland & Jack McCann (Falls)	W. Allen & J. McCutcheon (North Belfast)	
1926	Bob Rae & Percy Watson (Cavehill)	Charlie McShane & Ernie Duggan (Falls)	
1927	Harry King & Alex McAlpine (Castleton)	J. B. Teuton & W. R. Forsythe (Ulster)	
1928	J. Quigley & R. Carson (Castleton)	J. B. Teuton & R. J. Thompson (Ulster)	
1929	Jimmy Stewart & Bob Miller (Bangor)	A. Cush & H. Russell (Forth River)	
1930	Watty Lyons & Percy Watson (Cavehill)	J. Wilson & J. A. Love (Coleraine)	
1931	C. McCartney & Fred Wright (Alexandra)	J.Baker & J. Brown (Woodvale)	
1932	Cecil Curran & Charlie Clawson (Shaftesbury)	J. Moon & A. McAlpine (Castleton)	
1933	W. Andrews & S. Bradley (Forth River)	Sutherland & Morton (Coleraine)	
1934	Fred Bestall & George Cooper (Kenilworth)	Watty Lyons & Percy Watson (Cavehill)	
1935	J. Kernohan & W. J. Irwin (Castleton)	H. J. Deering & Alex Brown (Belmont)	
1936	J. Patterson & J. Wilkin (Alexandra)	R. T. Young & R. Ralph (Ballynafeigh)	
1937	H. Jones & W. J. Thompson (Belfast)	H. McCutcheon & J. Glass (Divis)	
1938	Fred Bestall & E. A. Ingram (Kenilworth)	Watty Lyons & Percy Watson (Cavehill)	
1939	Cecil Curran & Charlie Clawson (Shaftesbury)	H. McCormick & A.Brown (Belmont)	
1940	W. Robinson & J. A. Boyd (Clontarf)	R. Martin & W. McClelland (Bangor)	
1941-1945 not held
1946	W. J. Flook & W. L. Bowie (Kenilworth)	Baird & J. Glass (Forth River)	
1947	Bob Miller & Sammy Mulholland (Bangor)	E. Currie & Albert Cameron (Coleraine)	
1948	R. McCartney & J. Leadbetter (Castleton)	W. McCauley & J. McArthur (Ballymoney)	
1949	George Best & Syd Thompson (Willowfield)	T. M. Smith & Tom Henry (Londonderry)	
1950	Jack Webb & Alex Carr (Musgrave)	A. B. McLaughlin & Percy Watson (Cavehill)	
1951	Garth Anderson & Roy Fulton (Coleraine)	R. Hayes & J. McNab (Willowfield)	
1952	R. M. Watson & Tom Henry (Londonderry)	T. McGrand & Jimmy McHaffie (Woodvale)	
1953	Joe McPherson & Christie Fox (Willowfield)	Harry Morris & Pat McCarragher (Divis)	
1954	Jimmy Burns & Gerry Crossey (Falls)	Joe McPherson & Christie Fox (Willowfield)	
1955	Sammy Park & Jack McDonald (Cliftonville)	T. Sutton and V. McAleese (Carrickfergus)	
1956	Bob Sterling & Jimmy Boyd (Shaftesbury)	R. Dunn & Harry Stevenson (Donaghadee)	
1957	George Best & Syd Thompson (Willowfield)	Harry Bustard & Jimmy McHaffie (Woodvale)	
1958	Gilmore Elder & Jimmy Gault (Woodvale)	John S. Kelso & Tom Henry (Londonderry)	
1959	R. Dunn & Harry Stevenson (Donaghadee)	P. J. Galligan & M Liston (Blackrock)	
1960	John S. Kelso & Tom Henry (Londonderry)	C. Allen & J. E. Haslem (Shaftesbury)	
1961	Harry Watterson & Gerry Crossey (Falls)	George McFadden & S. Kayes (Woodvale)	
1962	Jimmy Connolly & Pat McGuirk (Leinster)		
1963	Charlie Taylor & Roy Fulton (Coleraine)	Percy Watson, G Wright & John Campbell (sub) (Cavehill)	
1964	Charlie Taylor & Roy Fulton (Coleraine)	C. Allen & J. E. Haslem (Shaftesbury)	
1965	Charlie Park & Tommy Russell (Belmont)	J. Leslie & W. Roberts (Musgrave)	
1966	Charlie Taylor & Roy Fulton (Coleraine)	H. McCullough & Jim Holland (Pickie)	
1967	Charlie Taylor & Roy Fulton (Coleraine)	Johnny Fulham & Pat McGuirk (Leinster)	
1968	Tom Kennedy & Davy McEnaney (Leinster)	Andy Smyth & Billy Pimley (Falls)	
1969	George McDowell & Walter Furlonger (Holywood)	Andy Smyth & Billy Pimley (Falls)	
1970	Norman Fisher & Jim Ringland (Lisnagarvey)	Jack Webb & Jimmy Donnelly (Falls)	
1971	Liam Byrne & Don Mellor (Leinster)	Sam Cheddy & David Hill (Castleton)	
1972	David Marchant & Tom Kennedy (Leinster)	Sam Cheddy & David Hill (Castleton)	
1973	Garth Anderson & Roy Fulton (Coleraine)	Bob Sharp & Alex Burrows (Herbert Park)	
1974	David Marchant & Tom Kennedy (Leinster)	Stan Espie & Jimmy Donnelly (Falls)	
1975	David Marchant & Tom Kennedy (Leinster)	Colin Irons & Phil McAllister (Woodvale)	
1976	Alf Keegan & Lou Halpin (Catholic Young Men)	John Higgins & Sam Currie (York Road CD)	
1977	Jim Gallagher & Cecil Beck (Banbridge)	Joe Rogan & Jimmy Donnelly (Falls)	
1978	Paul Moorehead & Pat McGuirk (Leinster)	Wilmer Thompson & Jackie Campbell (Ards)	
1979	Joe Rogan & Jimmy Donnelly (Falls)	Maurice Geary & David Marchant (Blackrock)	
1980	Tony Murray & Tom Kennedy (Herbert Park)	Chris Wallace & Frank Campbell (Carrickfergus)	
1981	Rodney McCutcheon & Keith Herron (Bangor)	Alan McCombe & Sandy Smith (Knock)	
1982	Norman Lambe & Jeff McMullan (Ormeau)	Noel O'Hara & Pat O'Hara (Herbert Park)	
1983	Leslie Wilson & Trevor Porter (Bangor)	Hugh Shannon & Ralph Connor (Ballymoney)	
1984	Hugh Dunlop & Ken Hogg (Ballymoney)		
1985	Billy Chambers & Stanley Hegan (Shaftesbury)		
1986	Harry Evans & Roy McReavie (Forth River)		
1987	Brian Craig & Jim Baker (Cliftonville)		
1988	A. McMullan & M. Reid (Balmoral)		
1989	G. Rees & M. Graham (Bangor)		
1990	Barry Moffett & Jeremy Henry (Portrush)		
1991	Sean Quinn & Liam McHugh (Cookstown)		
1992	Ronnie Milliken & J. Irwin (Ballymoney)		
1993	R. Oliver & Ian McClure (Portrush)		
1994	Barry Moffett & Jeremy Henry (Portrush)		
1995	Ian Stewart & Stephen Moran (Carrickfergus)		
1996	Ronnie Milliken & J. Irwin (Ballymoney)		
1997	Ian Perry & Andrew Hughes (Portadown)		
1998	D. Lloyd & G. D'Arcy (CYM)		
1999	Robert Hastings & Gary Scott (Bangor)		
2000	Victor Dallas & Stephen Brewster (Coleraine)		
2001	Jim Baker & Sammy Allen (Ballymena)		
2002	Barry Browne & Martin McHugh (Whitehead)	Ian Gillen & John Nolan (Blackrock)	
2003	Ian McClure & Jeremy Henry (Portrush)	Connor Murphy & Blair Somers (Blackrock)	
2004	Richard Leonard & Stephen Millane (St. James’s Gate)	Paul Daly & Brendan Thompson (Ulster Transport)	
2005	Barry Browne & Martin McHugh (Whitehead)	Paul Daly & Brendan Thompson (Ulster Transport)	
2006	Barry Browne & Martin McHugh (Whitehead)	Ian McClure & Jeremy Henry (Portrush)	
2007	Paul Robinson & Andrew Kyle (Larne)	Ian Stewart & Stephen Moran (Whitehead)	
2008	Terry Mulholland & Chris Mulholland (Dunbarton)	Gary Clarke & Mark Shannon (Bangor)	
2009	Brian Hughes & Gary Kelly (Ballymoney)		
2010	Graham McKee & Robert Hastings (Bangor)		
2011	Colin Hogg & Mark Wilson (Cookstown)	Keith Padgett & Chris Jones (Portglenone)	
2012	Stephen Shields & Jim Baker (Ballymena)	Brendan Power & Gerard McGleave (Divis)	
2013	Barry Browne & Martin McHugh (Whitehead)	Aaron Tennant & Alan Paul (Ballymoney)	
2014	Barry Browne & Martin McHugh (Whitehead)	Ivan Craig & Neil Mulholland (Lisnagarvey)	
2015	Rodney Kane & Barry Kane (Dunluce)	Paul Daly & Simon Martin (Belmont)	
2016	Thomas Smyth & Paul Smyth (Leinster)	Michael Nutt & Stephen Kirkwood (Old Bleach)	
2017	Aaron Tennant & Gary Kelly (Ballymoney)	Conor McCartan & Derick Wilson (Dunbarton)	
2018	Terry Crawford & Gary Eaton Jr. (Salisbury)	Aidan Corrigan & Mark Sproule (Portadown)	
2019	Colin Hogg & Mark Wilson (Cookstown)	Philip Cromie & Noel Graham (Lisnagarvey)	
2020 cancelled due to COVID-19 pandemic
2021	Sam Barkley & Martin McHugh (Old Bleach)	Nicky Smyth & Shane Leonard (Crumlin)	
2022	Kyle Blakely & Jack Moffett (Banbridge)	Colin Hogg & Mark Wilson (Cookstown)	
2023	Paul Daly & Simon Martin (Belmont)	Nicky Smyth & Shane Leonard (Crumlin)	
2024	Colin Hogg & Mark Wilson (Cookstown)	Eamon Carruth & Richie Leonard (Crumlin)	
2025	Martin McAleese & Willie McCaw (Ballymoney))	Ryan McElroy & Jack Moffett (Dunbarton)	

=== Men's triples ===
Year	Champion	Runner-Up	Ref
1970	W. McKane, Garth Anderson, Roy Fulton (Coleraine)	Falls	
1971	Jimmy Thompson, Tom Kennedy, David Marchant (Leinster)	Portrush	
1972	Jim Carroll, Tommy Corcoran, Vincent Donohoe (CYM)	Saintfield	
1973	D. Dolan, Davy McEnaney, Pat McGuirk (Leinster)	Falls	
1974	S. Maguire, David Marchant, Tom Kennedy (Leinster)	Banbridge	
1975	Raymond Weir, Ken Hogg, Willie Murray (Portrush)	Belmont	
1976	Eddie McNally, Billy McKelvey, Jim Brankin (Falls)	Crumlin	
1977	John Higgins, David Heatley, Sammy Curry (York Road)	Falls	
1978	Eddie McNally, Billy McKelvey, Jim Brankin (Falls)	Dunluce	
1979	Robin Gray, Marcus Craig, Jim Craig (Cliftonville)	Herbert Park	
1980	Jimmy Dickie, Jim Henderson, Dessie Newell (Knock)	Carrickfergus	
1981	Paul Moorehead, Richard Darcy, Paul Smyth (Leinster)	Falls	
1982	Billy Chivers, Davy Griffen, John McCullough (North Belfast)	Clarendon	
1983	Tommy Johnston, Tommy Smith, Ken Hogg (Ballymoney)	Crumlin	
1984	Tommy Johnston, Tommy Smith, Ken Hogg (Ballymoney)	Crumlin	
1985	Tom Thornton, Eddie Toner, Jarlath Connaughton (Crumlin)	Knock	
1986	Mervyn Jess, David Craig, Charlie Davis (Banbridge)	Belmont	
1987	Dickie McDermott, Joe Williamson, Richard McDermott (Coleraine)	Bangor	
1988	Davy Carson, Davy Heatley, Davy Johnston (Cliftonville)	Magherafelt	
1989	Joe Whyte, Clifford Craig, Ernie Parkinson (Ormeau)	Castleton	
1990	Gary McCloy, Russell Millar, Colin Hogg (Portrush)	Cliftonville	
1991	Joe Whyte, Clifford Craig, Ernie Parkinson (Ormeau)	Magherafelt	
1992	Eric Sands, Willie Smyth, Jackie Smyth (Magherafelt)	Blackrock	
1993	Barry Moffett, Jeremy Henry, Ian McClure (Portrush)	Ballymena	
1994	Cecil Aicken, John McCloughlin, Noel Graham (Lisnagarvey)	Cookstown	
1995	Ian McKeown, David Gardiner, Tony Budde (Belmont)	Portadown	
1996	Paul Daly, Brian Daly, Davy Hamilton (Belmont)	Portadown	
1997	C. Hogg, Tom McAleavey, J. Smith (Cookstown)	Old Bleach	
1998	Cecil Aicken, John McCloughlin, Noel Graham (Lisnagarvey)	Old Bleach	
1999	Tommy Smith, Willie McCaw, Ronnie Milliken (Ballymoney)	Dunbarton	
2000	Donald Roe, David Roe, Jonathon Ross (Lisnagarvey)	Portrush	
2001	Trevor Law, Michael Nutt, James Talbot (Old Bleach)	Crumlin	
2002	Trevor Colvin, Eddie Curran, Gary McCloy (Portrush)	Portadown	
2003	David Coulter, Stephen McKinley, Rodney Fiddis (Ulster Transport)	Dunluce	
2004	Nigel McKenna, Brendan Morrow, Brian McAlary (Kilrea)	Portadown	
2005	Paul Daly, Brian Daly, Brendan Thompson (Ulster Transport)	Londonderry Park	
2006	Michael Nutt, Sammy Hall, Neil Booth (Old Bleach)	St. James's Gate	
2007	Rodney Kane, Barry Kane, Mervyn McKeeman (Dunluce)	Londonderry Park	
2008	Darren McIlroy, Gary McElroy, Cliff Dennison (Dunbarton)	C.Y.M.	
2009	Richard Leonard, Stephen Millane, John Leonard (St. James's Gate)	Ballymena	
2010	Richard Leonard, Stephen Millane, John Leonard (St. James's Gate)	Ballymoney	
2011	Paul Daly, S. McKinley, Brendan Thompson (Ulster Transport)	St. James Gate	
2012	John Nicholl, Stephen Coleman, Andrew Kyle (Ballymena)	Bangor	
2013	David Copeland, Conor McCartan, D.J. Wilson (Dunbarton)	Banbridge	
2014	Michael Higgins, Tony Bell, Andy Hughes (Dunbarton)	Bangor	
2015	Gareth Pierpoint, Eamon Carruth, Robbie Maher (St. James's Gate)	Cookstown	
2016	Martin McHugh, Jack Montgomery, JR Wilson (Whitehead)	Ballymoney	
2017	Martin McHugh, Jack Moffett, JR Wilson (Whitehead)	Crumlin	
2018	Alistair Steele, Ali Davison, Willie McCaw (Ballymoney)	Dunbarton	
2019	Ronnie Talbot, Robert Kirkwood, Michael Nutt (Old Bleach)	Crumlin	
2020 cancelled due to COVID-19 pandemic
2021	Aaron Coleman, Ali Coleman, Stephen Coleman (Ballymena)	Portrush	
2022	Derek Smith, Gary McCloy, Ian McClure (Portrush)	Dunbarton	
2023	Mark McPeak, Paul Daly & Simon Martin (Belmont)	Bangor	
2024	Aaron Tennant, Ally Davison & Brian Smyth (Ballymoney)	Dunbarton	
2025	John Leonard, Nicky Smyth & Shane Leonard (Crumlin)	Portrush	

=== Men's fours/rinks ===
Year	Champion	Runner-Up	Ref
1908	A. T. Young, J. J. Quinn, J. W. Cooper, J. B. Mitchell (Kenilworth)	Belmont	
1909	William Lindsay, F. Brown, Dr John Rusk, A. Jamieson (Belfast)	Ballynafeigh	
1910	R. McCormick, Dick Taylor, George McMillen, John Pollock (Ballynafeigh)	Ballymena	
1911	D. D. Young, W. J. Arlow, T. H. Forsythe, W. R. Forsythe (Shaftesbury)	Ballynafeigh	
1912	A. Best, A. E. Greer, Dr John Rusk, A. Jamieson (Belfast)	Ulster	
1913	J. Robinson, J. R. Gray, Robert Blakely, Dr John Rusk (Cavehill)	Falls	
1914	J. B. Teuton, S. G. Mercer, W. J. Arlow, D. D. Young (Shaftesbury)	Knock	
1915	J. Tyson, R. Wilson, H. P. Grosse, A. R.Pulford (Ballynafeigh)	Knock	
1916	Samuel Craig, F. Clegg, J. F. Barklie, James Walker (Larne)	Ballynafeigh	
1917	P. Sheridan, A. Wilson, Walter Irvine, Dr Davison (Ulster)	Ballynafeigh	
1918	A. J. Chew, R. Stead, R.T. Whittet, R. Carson (Baird's)	Shaftesbury	
1919	R. Carr, G. Craig, A. Watt, S. Windrum (Shaftesbury)	Castleton	
1920	J. Wilson, A. D. Sutherland, T. J. Martin, J. A. Love (Coleraine)	Belmont	
1921	T. Taggart, A. Wilson, Robert Blakely, R. Wilson (Ulster)	Ballynafeigh	
1922	W. McLean, T. R. Neville, A. Boyce, J. Gillespie (North Belfast)	Cavehill	
1923	Tom Brown, J. Gillespie, J. McCutcheon, John Robinson (North Belfast)	Castleton	
1924	L. McLellan, T. Dickson, L. Small, J. Montagu (Shaftesbury)	Castleton	
1925	Jamie Cathcart, D. G. Parkinson, J. K.Neave, Joe Hamill (Ballymena)	North Belfast	
1926	R. Campbell, J. Clements Bob Rae, Percy Watson (Cavehill)	Castleton	
1927	David Agnew, Robert Kerr, A. H. Fitzsimmons, Wiliam Thompson (Ormeau)	Forth River	
1928	A. Acheson, T. Kernohan, W. J. Irwin, R. McAfee (Castleton)	Larne	
1929	T. R. Tarleton, R. Wilson, John Moore, Thomas Molyneaux (Ballynafeigh)	Larne	
1930	J. Fullerton, H. Jones, W. G. Weir, F. Speed (Queen's Island)	Shaftesbury	
1931	C. Park, J. McKelvey, D. Riddel, John Park (Woodvale)	Alexandra	
1932	W. Lawther, P. Stevenson, Thomas Molyneaux, John Moore (Ballynafeigh)	Woodvale	
1933	W. McClean, H. Savage, F. Sheppard, H. Livingstone (North Belfast)	Alexandra	
1934	J. Wilkin, H. Whiteside, T. Howe, Fred Wright (Alexandra)	Larne	
1935	J. Tate, W. Smith, J. Morrow, H. J. Deering (Belmont)	Shaftesbury	
1936	J. Potter, R. Carlisle, R Faulkner, F. Jackson (Strand)	Cavehill	
1937	H. McCutcheon, R. Maguire, E. Dundee, R Weir (Shaftesbury)	Divis	
1938	J. Conway, R. Mehaffy, A. Hanley, M. Moles (Woodvale)	Larne	
1939	A. J. White, R. Craig, D. H. Stephens, Fred Bestall (Leinster)	Shaftesbury	
1940	J. Shields, B. Farrelly, F. Lewis, J. Thompson (Divis)	Alexandra	
1941-1945 not held
1946	W. J.Neill, R. McKinlay, R. McClelland, J.Beck (Alexandra)	Divis	
1947	J. McPherson, T. Bell, R. Curran, Charlie Clawson (Shaftesbury)	Cliftonville	
1948	D. King, H. Logan, J. McGarry, A. B. McLaughlin (Cavehill)	Londonderry	
1949	C. Doherty, A. Wilson, T.Hogan, E. Armstrong (St. James's Gate)	North Belfast	
1950	Johnny Hyland, Davy McEnaney, Walter Chapman, Pat McGuirk (Leinster)	Falls	
1951	W. Andrews, C. Hoey, W.R. Hanna, W.J. Baird (Forth River)	Musgrave	
1952	C. McCarthy, Walter Chapman, R. H. Adjey, R. Craig (Leinster)	Bangor	
1953	Johnny Fulham, Davy McEnaney, Walter Chapman, Pat McGuirk (Leinster)	Ballycastle	
1954	Johnny Fulham, Davy McEnaney, Jimmy Thompson, Pat McGuirk (Leinster)	Donaghadee	
1955	G. Dawson, E. Millar, A. McKelvey, Seve Dornan, (Botanic)	Blackrock	
1956	J. Stockman, W. Rea, Garth Anderson, Roy Fulton (Coleraine)	Belmont	
1957	W. Campbell, R. Adjey, C. McCarthy, Alex Cuolahan, (Kenilworth)	Portrush	
1958	H. McAllister, J. Connor, W.Caldwell, Albert Cameron (Portrush)	Woodvale	
1959	B. Moore, M. Waddell, F. J. Harris, Billy Tate (Bangor)	Londonderry	
1960	George Best, William Greer, Fred Greer, Syd Thompson (Willowfield)	Woodvale	
1961	George Best, William Greer, Fred Greer, Syd Thompson (Willowfield)	Bangor	
1962	Harry Watterson, Gerry McNeill, Jack Webb, Gerry Crossey (Falls)	Banbridge	
1963	Johnny Fulham, Davy McEnaney, Jimmy Connolly, Pat McGuirk (Leinster)	Shaftesbury	
1964	Tom Russell, Bertie McConnell, Billy Clarke, Joe Carlisle (Belmont)	Clontarf	
1965	J. K. Rankin, W Rodgers, W. Pollock, Billy Tate (Bangor)	Coleraine	
1966	J. Wilkinson, W Rodgers, W. Pollock, Billy Tate (Bangor)	Coleraine	
1967	Cecil Beck, R Mills, Walter Gamble, Jimmy Dennison (Banbridge)	Falls	
1968	Jimmy Donnelly, Jack Webb, Harry Watterson, Gerry Crossey (Falls)	Coleraine	
1969	W. Hanna, W Rodgers, W. Pollock, Billy Tate (Bangor)	Lisnagarvey	
1970	Danny Laverty, Tom O'Neill, Bob McDowell, Phil McAlister (Woodvale)	Londonderry	
1971	R. Burns, Eddie McVeigh, D. Francis, Sammy Ashwood (Balmoral)	Coleraine	
1972	Jim Flanagan, Peter Gregory, Harry Watterson, Gerry Crossey (Falls)	Ballymoney	
1973	Willie Harbinson, Tommy Boyd, Gordon Wylie, John Henry (Ballymoney)	Pickie	
1974	Raymond Weir, R Currie, Ken Hogg, Willie Murray (Portrush)	Castle	
1975	Jim Lewis, Eddie McClenahan, Harry Montgomery, Neville Fisher (Lisnagarvey)	Ballymoney	
1976	Paul Moorehead, Paul Smyth, Pat McGuirk, Tom Kennedy (Leinster)	North Down	
1977	David Corkill, Ken Kilpatrick, North McQuay, Willie Watson (Knock)	Coleraine	
1978	Derek Mineely, Norman Summerville, Tommy Mayne, Billy McKee (Musgrave)	Belmont	
1979	Alex Beggs, Jimmy Hunter, Roy Hill, Herbie Bell (Whitehead)	Portrush	
1980	John Eddie Mullan, Raymond Weir, Joe Williamson, Willie Murray (Portrush)	Knock	
1981	Paul Moorehead, Richard Darcy, Paul Smyth, Brian Carpenter (Leinster)	Ballymoney	
1982	Brian Sloan, Morrow Horner, Ian McKeown, Robin Horner (Belmont)	Banbridge	
1983	Peter O'Hara, Noel O'Hara, Paddy O'Hara, Tony Murray (Herbert Park)	Ballymoney	
1984	Frank Daly, Dennis Darcy, Paddy Aspel, Jarlath Connaughton (Crumlin)	Cliftonville	
1985	Victor Dallas, Richard McDermott, Vincent Mullan, Dick McDermott (Coleraine)	Carrickfergus	
1986	Tom Evans, William McFadden, William Patton, Sammy Wylie (Old Bleach)	Blackrock	
1987	Brian Begley, Sean Wragg, Dickie Hughes, Vincent Mullan (Portrush)	Banbridge	
1988	D Hickinson, J Gault, H Shannon, Gordon Wylie (Ballymoney)	Falls	
1989	D Mineely, Morrow Horner, Brian Sloan, Robin Horner (Belmont)	Ormeau	
1990	Robert Hastings, Jackie Nelson, Rodney McCutcheon, Gary Scott (Bangor)	Cliftonville	
1991	David Duthie, Robert Taylor, Willie McKeown, Harry Elliott (Dunluce)	Ormeau	
1992	Jim McConville, Sammy Kerr, Tom Greenfield, Myles Greenfield (Dunbarton)	Coleraine	
1993	Paul Daly, R Stothers, G Mitchell, Brian Daly (Belmont)	Dunluce	
1994	Bobby Smith, Robin Gray, John Patterson, Davy Johnston (Cliftonville)	Brooke Park	
1995	Ian Stewart, James Caldwell, Dessie Hill, Stephen Moran (Carrickfergus)	Old Bleach	
1996	Michael Stewart, Hugh McHugh, Martin McHugh, William Keyes (Whitehead)	Ballymoney	
1997	David Roe, M. Nelson, Donald Roe, Jonathon Ross (Lisnagarvey)	Belmont	
1998	Billy Chambers, Barry Quinn, Gary Clarke, Mark Shannon (Bangor)	CYM	
1999	Donie Garvey, Tom Farren, Maurice Kelly, Bernie Vaughan (CYM)	Dunbarton	
2000	Mark McPeak, Terry Mulholland, Robin Horner, Chris Mulholland (Belmont)	Larne	
2001	Michael Nutt, Sammy Hall, James Talbot, Neil Booth (Old Bleach)	Dunluce	
2002	Conor Murphy, Blair Somers, Michael Scanlon, Ian Gillen (Blackrock)	Balmoral	
2003	Mark McPeak, John Boyd, Davy Hamilton, Roy Battersby (Belmont)	Banbridge	
2004	Tommy Johnston, Kieran Campbell, Liam McHugh, Colin Hogg (Cookstown)	St. James's Gate	
2005	Martin McHugh, Michael Stewart, Hugh McHugh, Philip Gilmartin, JR Wilson (Whitehead)	Brookgreen	
2006	Allister Calvin, Richard McDermott, Stephen Brewster, Victor Dallas (Coleraine)	Dunbarton	
2007	Steven Falls, Jimmy Hodges, Nigel Robinson, Jim Baker (Ballymena)	Leinster	
2008	Simon Colville, Rodney Kane, Barry Kane, Mervyn McKeeman (Dunluce)	Pickie	
2009	Sean Trainor, Davy Nixon, Marty Trainor, Michael Merritt (Falls)	Ballymoney	
2010	Michael Higgins, Andy Hughes, Derick Wilson, Myles Greenfield (Dunbarton)	Bangor	
2011	Michael Bickerstaff, Ryan Craig, John Boyd, Clifford Craig (Balmoral)	Blackrock	
2012	Fergie Larkin, James Kelly, Tony Bell, Clifford Dennison (Dunbarton)	Balmoral	
2013	Gareth Pierpoint, Aidan Hoey, S. Leonard, Richard Leonard (St. James's Gate)	Lisnagarvey	
2014	Michael Higgins, Andy Hughes, D.J Wilson, Myles Greenfield (Dunbarton)	Ballymoney	
2015	Matthew Hastings, Thomas Cannavan, Graham McKee, Robert Hastings (Bangor)	St. James's Gate	
2016	Stuart Bennett, Robin Horner, Ryan Cavan, Simon Martin (Belmont)	Dunluce	
2017	Robin Beattie, Jackie Erskine, Keith Taylor, Simon Denley (Bangor)	Cookstown	
2018	Gary Kelly, Brian Smyth, Jim Martin, Aaron Tennant (Ballymoney)	Banbridge	
2019	Darren Atkinson, Robin Horner, Ryan Cavan, Simon Martin (Belmont)	Divis	
2020 cancelled due to the COVID-19 pandemic
2021	Dean Mills, Mark McPeak, David Corkill, Stuart Bennett (Belmont)	Limavady	
2022	Nigel Beggs, Paul Daly, Ryan Cavan, Simon Martin (Belmont)	Coleraine	
2023	Jonny Shepherd, James Shaw, Colin Hogg, Mark Wilson (Cookstown)	Larne	
2024	Robbie Maher, Eamon Carruth, Richie Leonard & Shane Leonard (Crumlin)	Dunbarton	
2025	Robbie Maher, Eamon Carruth, Richie Leonard & Shane Leonard (Crumlin)	Old Bleach	

=== Women's singles ===
Year	Champion	Ref
1964	Sadie Herron (Alexandra)	
1965	Agnes Sterrett (Ward Park)	
1966	Ellen Cameron (Belfast)	
1967	Elsie Furlonger (Holywood)	
1968	May Ross (Ward Park)	
1969	Belle McKeag (Wingrave)	
1970	Maura Brown (Leinster)	
1971	Maura Brown (Leinster)	
1972	Bessie Sharpe (Herbert Park)	
1973	Eileen Bell (Saintfield)	
1974	Nessie Burnett (Herbert Park)	
1975	Nessie Burnett (Herbert Park)	
1976	Nessie Burnett (Herbert Park)	
1977	Maura Brown (Leinster)	
1978	Ellen Cameron (Belfast)	
1979	Nessie Burnett (Herbert Park)	
1980	Maureen Montgomery (Cavehill)	
1981	Nancy Gibson (Lisnagarvey)	
1982	Eileen Bell (Belfast)	
1983	Hilda Hamilton (Belfast)	
1984	Margaret Johnston (Ballymoney)	
1985	Eileen Bell (Belfast)	
1986	Mabel Johnston (Ballymena)	
1987	Betty Dunne (Blackrock)	
1988	Alice Tunney (Kenilworth)	
1989	Phillis Nolan (Blackrock)	
1990	Marie Barber (Blackrock)	
1991	Phillis Nolan (Blackrock)	
1992	Phillis Nolan (Blackrock)	
1993	Marie Barber (Blackrock)	
1994	Margaret Johnston (Ballymoney)	
1995	Margaret Johnston (Ballymoney)	
1996	Margaret Johnston (Ballymoney)	
1997	Phillis Nolan (Blackrock)	
1998	Margaret Johnston (Ballymoney)	
1999	Bernie O'Neill (Portstewart)	
2000	Pat MacDonagh (Leinster)	
2001	Barbara Cameron (Ballymena)	
2002	Alicia Weir (NI Civil Service)	
2003	Margaret Johnston (Ballymoney)	
2004	Phillis Nolan (Blackrock)	
2005	Jennifer Dowds (Ballymena)	
2006		
2007	Phillis Nolan (Blackrock)	
2008		
2009		
2010	Marie McCord (Ewarts)	
2011	Mandy Cunningham (Ewarts)	
2012	Sally McAuley (Ewarts)	
2013	Mandy Cunningham (Ewarts)	
2014	Bernie O'Neill (Portstewart)	
2015	Roaemarie Brown (Dun Laoghaire)	
2016	Bernie O'Neill (Portstewart)	
2017	Alicia Weir (NI Civil Service)	
2018	Courtney Wright (Ewarts)	
2019	Jennifer McClure (Castle Park)	
2020 & 2021 cancelled due to COVID-19 pandemic
2022	Noeleen Kelly (Crumlin)	
2023	Sarah Kelly (Crumlin)	
2024	Shauna O'Neill (Limavady)	
2025	Shauna O'Neill (Limavady)	

=== Women's pairs ===
Year	Champion	Ref
1947	Alexandra	
1948	Londonderry	
1949	Kenilworth	
1950	Kenilworth	
1951	Ward Park	
1952	Ward Park	
1953	Ward Park	
1954	Castleton	
1955	Chichester	
1956	Ward Park	
1957	Pickie	
1958	York Road Civil Defence	
1959	Castleton	
1960	Salisbury	
1961	Knock	
1962	Salisbury	
1963	Ward Park	
1964	Whitehead	
1965	Margaret Stormont & May Ross (Ward Park)	
1966	Houston & Lockhart (Whitehead)	
1967	Cameron & Morrow (Wingrave)	
1968	Barnes & Beattie (Brookvale)	
1969	G. Lewis & Queenie Bailey (Lisnagarvey)	
1970	Collins & Wilson (Deramore)	
1971	McGrath & Rita Stevenson (Belfast)	
1972	Morrison & Thompson (Saintfield)	
1973	I McDowell & Ellen Cameron (Belfast)	
1974	Agne Middleton & Molly Byrne (Leinster)	
1975	I Reddock & F Andrews (Ballymena)	
1976	P Marchant & Alma Prodohl (Blackrock)	
1977	Nan Allely & Daisy Fraser (Donaghdee)	
1978	M Wilson & A Brown (Holywood)	
1979	Nan Allely & Daisy Fraser (Donaghdee)	
1980	Tilly Costley & Lena Simpson (Knock)	
1981	K McGrath & Ellen Cameron (Belfast)	
1982	S Adair & A Hewitt (Belfast)	
1983	Phillis Nolan & Marie Barber (Blackrock)	
1984	Margaret Johnston & Muriel McCullough (Ballymoney)	
1985	Margaret Paul & Muriel McCullough (Ballymoney)	
1986	Betty Patterson & Lynne Johnston (Belfast)	
1987	Min Keag & Madge Cheddy (Castleton)	
1988	Christine O'Gorman & Alma Prodohl (Blackrock)	
1989	Alice Elliott & Joyce Mulholland (Dunluce)	
1990	Belle McKeag & Marie Martin (Wingrave)	
1991	Rosie Ivie & Marian Hoey (Crumlin)	
1992	Marie Barber & Phillis Nolan (Blackrock)	
1993	Irene Minnis & Freda Elliott (Knock)	
1994	Geraldine Law & Patricia Horner (NI Civil Service)	
1995	Jennifer Dowds & Margaret Johnston (Ballymoney)	
1996	Marie Barber & Phillis Nolan (Blackrock)	
1997	Jennifer Dowds & Margaret Johnston (Ballymoney)	
1998	Ruth Simpson & Dorothy Kane (Moat Park)	
1999	Alice Elliott & Joyce Mulholland (Dunluce)	
2000	Donna McNally & Mary Massey (Comber)	
2001	Theresa Reinhardt & Maureen Daley (Herbert Park)	
2002	Alicia Weir & Paula Montgomery (NI Civil Service)	
2003	M J Campbell & Margaret Johnston (Ballymoney)	
2004	Margaret Campbell & Bernie O'Neill (Portstewart)	
2005	Marian Hoey & Phillis Nolan (Blackrock)	
2006	Maureen Shaw & Margaret Johnston (Ballymoney)	
2007	Olive Paisley & Sally McAuley	
2008		
2009	Alicia Weir & Paula Montgomery (NI Civil Service)	
2010	Ida Eldon & Val Wilson (Dungannon)	
2011	Carole McQuade & Christine O'Gorman (Blackrock)	
2012	Margaret McNevin & Noeleen Kelly (Crumlin)	
2013	Penney Johnston & Anne McClelland (Dunluce)	
2014	Helen Wilson & Karen Woodside (Knock)	
2015	Carole McQuade & Christine O'Gorman (Blackrock)	
2016	Cliodhna Eadie & Sandra Bailie (Knock)	
2017	Jean Lyden & Ann Sloan (Dungannon)	
2018	Sarah Kelly & Noeleen Kelly (Crumlin)	
2019	Sarah Kelly & Noeleen Kelly (Crumlin)	
2020 & 2021 cancelled due to COVID-19 pandemic
2022	Sandra Bailie & Alison Morris (NI Civil Service)	
2023	Ashleigh Rainey & Lara Reaney (Ewarts)	
2024	Sarah Kelly & Noeleen Kelly (Crumlin)	
2025	Sarah Kelly & Noeleen Kelly (Crumlin)	

=== Women's triples ===
Year	Champion	Ref
1979	J Murphy, E O'Hara, Nessie Burnett (Herbert Park)	
1980	J Hollinger, Peg Dillon, Nan Allely (Donaghdee)	
1981	R O'Neill, M Henry, M Paul (Ballymoney)	
1982	Freda Elliott, D Turner, M Ross (Belfast)	
1983	M Montgomery, Alice Elliott, Joyce Mulholland (Dunluce)	
1984	E Clements, Eileen Morrison, Maureen Mallon (Lisnagarvey)	
1985	Kathleen Megrath, Hilda Hamilton, Eileen Bell (Belfast)	
1986	M Furlong, M Schofield, Phillis Nolan (Blackrock)	
1987	Kathleen Megrath, Hilda Hamilton, Eileen Bell (Belfast)	
1988	Moya Murphy, Nan Coyle, Eileen Nicholl (Ballymena)	
1989	Kathleen Megrath, Hilda Hamilton, Eileen Bell (Saintfield)	
1990	Nan Montgomery, Alice Elliott, Joyce Mulholland (Dunluce)	
1991	P McAlary, B Dunlop, Margaret Johnston (Ballymoney)	
1992	Iris Scott, Eileen Morrison, Maureen Mallon (Lisnagarvey)	
1993	Betty Dunne, P Dosson, Christine O'Gorman (Blackrock)	
1994	Pauline Mackie, Valerie Wilson, Maureen Fearon (Dungannon)	
1995	Pauline Mackie, Valerie Wilson, Maureen Fearon (Dungannon)	
1996	Pat Dawson, Emerald Higston, Christine O'Gorman (Blackrock)	
1997	L. Clarke, M. Maguire, Ann McGuinness (Divis)	
1998	Irene Minnis, Pat Smyth, Freda Elliott (Knock)	
1999	Pauline Day, Patsy McCann, Marie Tormey (Leinster)	
2000	Joyce Gregg, Anita Stanney, Audrey Doggart (Hilden)	
2001	Muriel Wilkinson, Alicia Weir, Paula Montgomery (NI Civil Service)	
2002	Pauline Mackie, Valerie Wilson, Maureen Fearon (Dungannon)	
2003	P Caldin, Alice Elliott, Joyce Mulholland (Dunluce)	
2004	S. McGarel, M. McAuley, L. McMaster (Larne)	
2005	M. Clarke, L. French, M. Moody (Portstewart)	
2006		
2007	E Gregg, Sadie Baillie, Marie McCord (Ewarts)	
2008		
2009	Jean Kane, Marge O'Lear, Phyllis Brett (Bray)	
2010	Alice Tunney (Kenilworth)	
2011	Bernie McGleenan, Margaret McGrath, Ann McKivor (Dungannon)	
2012	Cliodhna Eadie, Karen Woodside, Sandra Bailie (Knock)	
2013	Freda Page, Elizabeth Woods, Elizabeth Boal (Belmont)	
2014	Carole McQuade, Heather Cahill, Phillis Nolan (Blackrock)	
2015	Patricia Ross, Hilary Cavan, Alicia Weir (NI Civil Service)	
2016	Chloe Watson, Cliodhna Eadie, Sandra Bailie (Knock)	
2017	Carole McQuade, Anne Gillen-Murphy, Christine O'Gorman (Blackrock)	
2018	Ashleigh Rainey, Jean Boyd, Sally McAuley (Ewarts)	
2019	Ann Smith, Margaret Paul, Megan Morrow (Ballymoney)	
2020 & 2021 cancelled due to COVID-19 pandemic
2022	Grace Henry, Barbara Cameron, Donna McCloy (Ballymena)	
2023	Ann Smith, Zoe Stratton, Margaret Paul (Ballymoney)	
2024	Caroline Murray, Pauline Curry, Bernie O'Neill (Portstewart)	
2025	Rachel Cochrane, Hannah Cochrane, Shauna O'Neill (Limavady)	

=== Women's fours/rinks ===
Year	Champion	Ref
1947	Cavehill	
1948	Kenilworth	
1949	Londonderry	
1950	Alexandra	
1951	Leinster	
1952	Ward Park	
1953	Chichester	
1954	Ward Park	
1955	Chichester	
1956	Castleton	
1957	York Road Civil Defence	
1958	Whitehead	
1959	Belmont	
1960	Pickie	
1961	Castleton	
1962	Knock	
1963	Wingrave	
1964	Forth River	
1965	Brookvale	
1966	York Road Civil Defence	
1967	Salisbury	
1968	Lisnagarvey	
1969	Burnett (Herbert Park)	
1970	Ballyholme	
1971	Elsie Patterson, Senga McCrone, Greta Burnett, Queenie Bailey (Lisnagarvey)	
1972	Knock	
1973	A Allan, G Beattie, M Gennett, Nancy Gibson (Lady Neill)	
1974	Margaret Kennedy, I Reddock, F Andrews, Eileen Nichol (Ballymena)	
1975	A Allen, M Jennett, M Beattie, Nancy Gibson (Lisnagarvey)	
1976	R Porter, S Herron, R Wilson, Ann Patton (Deramore)	
1977	M Kelly, E McMillan, I Smyth, Dorothy Blackstock (Deramore)	
1978	J Mulligan, M McMurray, M Wilson, A Brown (Deramore)	
1979	P Marchant, Phillis Nolan, Marie Barber, Alma Prodohl (Blackrock)	
1980	A McNulty, J Spencer, L Watts, Alice Tunney (Kenilworth)	
1981	W Boylan, Maureen Webb, B McKelvey, Kathleen Toner (Falls)	
1982	Freda Elliott, E Wilkinson, Eileen Bell, M Ross (Belfast)	
1983	Margaret Dunlop, A McAlary, Muriel McCullough, Margaret Johnston (Ballymoney)	
1984	Kathleen Megrath, Hilda Hamilton, Eileen Bell, Ellen Cameron (Belfast)	
1985	Kathleen Megrath, Hilda Hamilton, D McGill, Eileen Bell (Belfast)	
1986	Pat Marchant, Christine O'Gorman, Marie Barber, Alma Prodohl (Blackrock)	
1987	M Stewart, M Tosh, M Boyd, Ellen Cameron (Belfast)	
1988	M Owens, E McKebben, M Matthews, Freda Elliott (Belmont)	
1989	Betty Dunne, Christine O'Gorman, Marie Barber, Alma Prodohl (Blackrock)	
1990	Nan Montgomery, Frances Chestnutt, Alice Elliott, Joyce Mulholland (Dunluce)	
1991	Iris Scott, Peggy Mallon, Eileen Morrison, Maureen Mallon (Lisnagarvey)	
1992	D Marsden, R Freeman, S Donald, N Gibson	
1993	M Killen, Margaret McGarrity, M Hand, M Martin (Falls)	
1994	Margaret Murphy, Pat Murphy, Marie Schofield, Phillis Nolan (Blackrock)	
1995	Margaret Murphy, Pat Murphy, Marie Schofield, Phillis Nolan (Blackrock)	
1996	Irene Minnis, Pat Smyth, J. Wilson, Freda Elliott (Knock)	
1997	Pauline Day, Patsy McCann, Cora McDermott, Marie Tormey (Leinster)	
1998		
1999	Ina Culligan, Mary Elliott, Deirdre McCulloch, Maeve Hoey (CYM)	
2000	Margaret Murphy, Pat Murphy, Marian Hoey, Phillis Nolan (Blackrock BC)	
2001	Pauline Mackie, Valerie Wilson, Ann McKiver, Maureen Fearon (Dungannon)	
2002		
2003	M J Campbell, M Robinson, B Graham, Margaret Johnston (Ballymoney)	
2004	W Russell, B Liddell, G McCormick, P Newton	
2005	Irene Minnis, Pat Smyth, M. McGuile, C. Young (Knock)	
2006		
2007	Carmel Scully, Pat Dawson, Noelline O'Reilly, Chrissie O'Gorman (Blackrock)	
2008	M. McGuile, Pat Smyth, Karen Woodside, Sandra Bailie (Knock)	
2009	Mary Bayliss, Helen Wilson, Phyllis McCandless, Kay Curran (Knock)	
2010	Carmel Scully, Pat Dawson, Noelline O'Reilly, Chrissie O'Gorman (Blackrock)	
2011	Cliodhna Eadie, Pat Smyth, Karen Woodside, Sandra Bailie (Knock)	
2012	Jacqueline Jones, Sarah-Jane Coleman, Donna McCloy, Jennifer Dowds (Ballymena)	
2013	Mae McIlmoyle, Noelle Graham, Anna Forest, Dessa Baird (Limavady)	
2014	Cliodhna Eadie, Pat Smyth, Karen Woodside, Sandra Bailie (Knock)	
2015	Patricia Ross, Wilma Adair, Hilary Cavan, Alicia Weir (NI Civil Service)	
2016	Sarah Kelly, Paula Russell-Toner, Margaret McNevin, Noeleen Kelly (Crumlin)	
2017	Megan Morrow, Mandy Tennant, Barbara Logue, Margaret Johnston (Ballymoney)	
2018	Sarah Kelly, Paula Russell, Margaret McNevin, Noeleen Kelly (Crumlin)	
2019	Pat Benson, Lara Reaney, Zoe Minish, Lynda Lyttle (Portadown)	
2020 & 2021 cancelled due to COVID-19 pandemic
2022	Marian Lynch, Pauline Murray, Georgina Morrissey & Cora Hamill (CYM)	
2023	Noelle Graham, Norma Marshall, Valerie Witherow, Dessa Baird (Limavady)	
2024	Ashleigh Rainey, Jean Boyd, Lara Reaney, Chloe Wilson (Ewarts)	
2025	Ann Smith, Margaret Paul, Zoe Stratton, Sophie McIntyre (Ballymoney)	
