= Northern Ireland at the 1986 Commonwealth Games =

- CGF code: NIR
- CGA: Northern Ireland Commonwealth Games Council
- Website: nicgc.org

in Edinburgh, Scotland
- Medals Ranked 7th: Gold 2 Silver 4 Bronze 9 Total 15

Commonwealth Games appearances (overview)
- 1934; 1938; 1950; 1954; 1958; 1962; 1966; 1970; 1974; 1978; 1982; 1986; 1990; 1994; 1998; 2002; 2006; 2010; 2014; 2018; 2022; 2026; 2030

Other related appearances
- Ireland (1930)

Northern Ireland competed at the 1986 Commonwealth Games in Edinburgh, Scotland, from 24 July to 2 August 1986.

Northern Ireland finished 7th in the medal table with two gold medals, four silver medals and nine bronze medals.

The Northern Irish team was named on 16 June 1986 and consisted of 80 athletes.

== Medalists ==
=== Gold ===
- Phil Beattie (400 metres hurdles)
- Women's pairs (lawn bowls)

=== Silver ===
- Martin Girvan (hammer throw)
- Sharon McPeake (long jump)
- Roy Nash (boxing)
- Men's trap pairs (shooting)

=== Bronze ===
- Janet Boyle (high jump)
- Chris Carleton (boxing)
- Damien Denny (boxing)
- Brendan Lowe (boxing)
- Patrick Tinney (boxing)
- Johnston Todd (boxing)
- Men's team trial (cycling)
- Men's fullbore rifle pairs (shooting)
- Men's fours (lawn bowls)

== Team ==
=== Athletics ===
Men

Athlete	Events	Club	Medals
Simon Herbert Baird	200m		
Phil Beattie	400m hurdles		Gold medal
Martin Gerard Deane	marathon		
Martin Girvan	hammer throw		Silver medal
Terence Peter Greene	5000m		
Mark Brian Kirk	800m, 1500m		
Floyd Manderson	high jump		
Peter McColgan	steeplechase, 5000m		
Kieran James Moore	110m hurdles		
John Robert Reynolds	discus throw, shot put		
Stephen Wilson Martin	1500m		

Women

Athlete	Events	Club	Medals
Janet Boyle	high jump		Bronze medal
Jackie McKernan	discus throw, shot put		
Elaine McLaughlin	400m hurdles		
Sharon McPeake	high jump		Silver medal
Moira O'Neill	marathon		
Judith Robinson	100m, 100m hurdles		

=== Badminton ===
Men

Athlete	Events	Club	Medals
Peter Ferguson	singles, doubles, team	Alpha BC, Lisburn	
Rikki Keag	singles, doubles, team	Alpha BC, Lisburn	
George Stephens	singles, doubles, team	Alpha BC, Lisburn	
Bill Thompson	singles, doubles, team	Alpha BC, Lisburn	

Women

Athlete	Events	Club	Medals
Barbara Beckett	singles, mixed, team	Alpha BC, Lisburn	
Holly Lane	singles, mixed, team	CYM SC, Terenure, Dublin	
Ann Stephens	singles, mixed, team	Alpha BC, Lisburn	

=== Boxing ===
Athlete	Events	Club	Medals
Chris Carleton	57kg featherweight	Oliver Plunkett ABC, Belfast	Bronze medal
Damien Denny	67kg welterweight	Holy Trinity BC, Belfast	Bronze medal
Brendan Lowe	63.5kg light-welterweight	Holy Family BC, Belfast	Bronze medal
Gerard McKenna	60kg lightweight	Newington ABC, Belfast	
Roy Nash	54kg bantamweight	St Mary's ABC, Derry	Silver medal
Brendan O'Hara	71kg light-middleweight	St Malachy's/George's ABC, Belfast	
Gerry Storey	81kg light-heavyweight	Holy Family BC, Belfast	
Patrick Tinney	75kg middleweight	Holy Family BC, Belfast	Bronze medal
Johnston Todd	-48kg light-flyweight	Holy Family BC, Belfast	Bronze medal

=== Cycling ===
Athlete	Events	Club	Medals
Joe Barr	team time trial		Bronze medal
Ian Chivers	road race		
Séamus Downey	road race		
Alastair Irvine	road race, scratch, team time trial		Bronze medal
David McCall	time trial, scratch		
Cormac McCann	road race, team time trial		Bronze medal
Martin Quinn	team time trial		Bronze medal

=== Judo ===
Demonstration event only

Men

Athlete	Events	Club	Medals
John Gibson	95kg half-heavyweight	UUC	
Eric Gwynne	78kg half-middleweight	Ards	
Shane McManus	+95kg heavyweight	UUC	
Aiden Mitchell	71kg lightweight	Queen's Univ, Belfast	
Colin Savage	65kg half-lightweight	Senshukwai JC	Gold medal
Jim Toland	60kg extra-lightweight	Long Tower Youth Club, Derry	
Terry Watt	86kg middleweight	St Columbs, Derry	

Women

Athlete	Events	Club	Medals
Dympna Doherty	61kg half-middleweight	Belfast	
Karen Gray	56kg lightweight	Senshukwai JC	Silver medal
Gilian Hughes	52kg half-lightweight	Senshukwai JC	
Una Macmahon	48kg extra-lightweight	Queen's Univ, Belfast	
Avril Malley	72kg half-heavyweight	Ren bu Kwai, Dungannon	Gold medal
Joyce Malley	66kg middleweight	Univ of Ulster, Coleraine	
Ailsa Miller	61kg half-middleweight	UUJ	
Vivienne Moorhouse	+72kg heavyweight	UUC	
Brona Ward	66kg middleweight	Belfast	

=== Lawn bowls ===
Men

Athlete	Events	Club	Medals
Stan Espie	singles	Willowfield BC	
Davy Hamilton	pairs	Belmont BC	
Roy McCune	fours	Limavady BC	Bronze medal
Rodney McCutcheon	pairs	Bangor BC	
Billie Montgomery	fours	Falls BC	Bronze medal
Ernie Parkinson	fours	Ormeau BC	Bronze medal
Willie Watson	fours	Knock BC	Bronze medal

Women

Athlete	Events	Club	Medals
Nan Allely	fours	Donaghadee BC	
Eileen Bell	singles	Belfast BC	
Freda Elliott	pairs	Belmont BC	Gold medal
Hilda Hamilton	fours	Belfast BC	
Margaret Johnston	pairs	Ballymoney BC	Gold medal
Kathleen Megrath	fours	Belfast BC	
Maureen Mallon	fours	Lisnagarvey BC	

=== Rowing ===
Men

Athlete	Events	Club	Medals
John Armstrong	Ltwt single sculls, double scull		
Patrick Armstrong	single sculls, double scull		
Mike Bailey	coxswain, coxed four (men & women)		
Colin Dickson	coxless fours, coxed four		
Colin Hunter	coxless fours, coxed four		
Domhnall MacAuley	coxless fours, coxed four		
Robert Storrs	coxless fours, coxed four		

Women

Athlete	Events	Club	Medals
Kathryn Armstrong	coxed four, ltw Coxless four		
Catherine Buchanan	coxed four, ltw Coxless four		
Angela Darby	coxed four, ltw Coxless four		
Alison Hamilton	coxed four, ltw Coxless four		

=== Shooting ===
Men

Athlete	Events	Medals
David Calvert	fullbore rifle, fullbore rifle pairs	Bronze medal
Eamon Furphy	trap, trap pair	Silver medal
Tom Hewitt	trap, trap pair	Silver medal
Martin Mace	air rifle, rifle 3pos, prone	
Martin Millar	fullbore rifle, fullbore rifle pairs	Bronze medal
Cliff Ogle	air rifle, rifle 3pos, prone	
Ken Stanford	air pistol, centre fire	
Albert Thompson	skeet, skeet pair	
Trevor West	skeet, skeet pair	
Robbie Williamson	air pistol, free pistol	

=== Swimming ===
Men

Athlete	Events	Club	Medals
Richard Gheel	100, 200m backstroke		
Willie Johnston	100m butterfly, 100m freestyle		
Mark Miller	200m, 1500m freestyle		

Women

Athlete	Events	Club	Medals
Sharon Dugan	100, 200m breaststroke, 4x100 medley, 4x100 free		
Joanne Guiller	100m backstroke, 100m butterfly, 100m free, 4x100 medley, 4x100 free		
Marion Madine	100, 200m butterfly, 100, 200m, 400m free, 4x100 medley, 4x100 free		
Nuala McKibben	100, 200m breaststroke, 4x100 medley, 4x100 free		

=== Wrestling ===
Athlete	Events	Medals
Mark Bowman	featherweight 62kg	
Eddie Cusak	middleweight 82kg	
Ivan Weir	heavyweight 100kg	
