= Hilda Hamilton =

Northern Irish international lawn bowler

Personal information
- Nationality: British (Northern Irish)

Sport
- Sport: Lawn and indoor bowls
- Club: Belfast BC; Saintfield BC
Medal record
Representing combined Ireland
British Isles Championships
Gold medal – first place	1988	triples
Gold medal – first place	1985, 1986	fours
Representing Northern Ireland
Irish Nationals
Gold medal – first place	1983	singles
Gold medal – first place	1985, 1987, 1989	triples
Gold medal – first place	1984, 1985	fours

Hilda Hamilton is a former international lawn and indoor bowler from Northern Ireland who competed at the Commonwealth Games.

== Biography ==
Hamilton was initially a member of the Belfast Bowls Club and represented the combined Ireland team at international level. She also bowled indoors.

She was the singles champion of Ireland at the 1983 Irish National Bowls Championships. and went on to win five more titles in the triples (1985, 1987 and 1989) and fours (1984, 1985). She subsequently qualified to represent Ireland at the British Isles Bowls Championships, winning the fours title in 1985 and 1986 and triples in 1988. The last of her national titles was with the Saintfield Bowls Club.

Hamilton represented the Northern Irish team at the 1986 Commonwealth Games in Edinburgh, Scotland, where she competed in the fours event, with Kathleen Megrath, Nan Allely and Maureen Mallon.

At the 1990 British Isles Championships Hamilton and fellow bowler Eileen Bell were forced to concede their matches due to the ban on the third Irish bowler Kathleen Megrath.
