= Alicia Crangle =

Northern Irish international lawn bowler

Alicia Crangle/Weir
Personal information
- Nationality: British (Northern Irish)
- Born: 30 March 1970 (age 56)

Sport
- Sport: Lawn and indoor bowls
- Club: Salisbury BC, Belfast; NI Civil Service BC, Belfast
Medal record
Representing Northern Ireland
British Isles Championships
| Gold medal – first place | 2010 | pairs |
| Gold medal – first place | 2002, 2016 | triples |
Irish Nationals
| Gold medal – first place | 2001, 2017 | singles |
| Gold medal – first place | 2002, 2009 | pairs |
| Gold medal – first place | 2001, 2015 | triples |
| Gold medal – first place | 2015 | fours |

Alicia Crangle married name Alicia Weir (born 30 March 1970) is a former international lawn bowler from Northern Ireland who competed at two Commonwealth Games.

== Biography ==
Crangle a pediatrician by profession, was a member of the Salisbury Bowls Club in Belfast and represented the combined Ireland team at international level.

Crangle represented the Northern Irish team at the 1998 Commonwealth Games in Kuala Lumpur, Malaysia, where she competed in the fours event, with Patricia Horner, Donna McNally and Geraldine Law.

After marrying she played under the name of Alicia Weir and represented the Northern Irish team again at the 2002 Commonwealth Games in Manchester, England, where she competed in the fours event, with Patricia Horner, Dessa Baird and Paula Montgomery.

Bowling for the NI Civil Service Bowls Club in Belfast, she won seven national titles at the Irish National Bowls Championships; the singles in 2002 and 2017, the pairs in 2002 and 2009, the triples in 2001 and 2015 and the fours in 2015.

She subsequently qualified to represent Ireland at the British Isles Bowls Championships, winning titles in 2002, 2010 and 2016.
