= Irish Women's Bowling Association =

Governing body for the sport of bowls for women in Ireland

- Sport: Bowls
- Jurisdiction: Ireland
- Abbreviation: IWBA
- Founded: 1947
- Affiliation: World Bowls
- Headquarters: Co. Antrim, Northern Ireland
- Secretary: Jennifer Dowds

Official website
- www.iwba.co.uk
- (Northern Ireland) & (Republic of Ireland)

The Irish Women's Bowling Association is the governing body for the sport of bowls for women in Ireland. The organisation is responsible for the promotion and development of lawn bowls in Northern Ireland and the Republic of Ireland, and is affiliated with the world governing body World Bowls. The IWBA also falls under the umbrella of the Irish Bowls Federation.

== History ==
Bowls in Ireland began with Scottish and English settlers in Northern Ireland during the 17th century.

In 1903, J. C. Hunter of Belfast visited England following an invitation by W.G. Grace and this led to five clubs forming the Irish Bowling Association (IBA) in 1904. However, it was not until the affiliation of the Dublin-based Kenilworth Bowling Club to the IBA that the organisation encompassed all of Ireland.

The Irish National Bowls Championships were inaugurated in 1908.

The Irish Women's Bowling Association was formed on 17 October 1947 and had eight founder member clubs. This grew to 56 by 1972 and the Irish Women's Bowling League was created in 1952, followed by the Junior League in 1964. In 1969 the four competitions still used today to qualify for the Nationals were introduced, they were; the NI Private Greens League (NIWPGL), the Ladies Bowling League of Ireland (LBLI) the Provincial Towns Women's BA (PTWBA) and the Northern Ireland Women's BA (NIWBA).

The association is the governing body for the sport of bowls for women in Ireland. The organisation is responsible for the promotion and development of lawn bowls in Northern Ireland and the Republic of Ireland, and is affiliated with the world governing body World Bowls. The IWBA also falls under the umbrella of the Irish Bowls Federation.
