= Sarah McAuley =

Sarah McAuley may refer to:

- Sarah McAuley (bowls)
- Sarah McAuley (field hockey)
