= Barbara Logue =

Northern Irish international lawn bowler

Personal information
- Nationality: British (Northern Irish)
- Born: c.1961

Sport
- Sport: Lawn and indoor bowls
- Club: Ballymoney BC
Medal record
Representing Northern Ireland
Irish Nationals
Gold medal – first place	2017	fours

Barbara Logue (born c.1961), is a former international lawn bowler from Northern Ireland who competed at the Commonwealth Games.

== Biography ==
Logue was a member of the Ballymoney Bowls Club and represented the combined Ireland team at international level.

Logue represented the Northern Irish team at the 2010 Commonwealth Games in Delhi, India, where she competed in the triples event, with Mandy Cunningham and Sandra Bailie.

Logue was a 2016 Irish indoor fours runner-up and was the outdoor fours champion of Ireland at the 2017 Irish National Bowls Championships and subsequently qualified to represent Ireland at the British Isles Bowls Championships. She also represented Ireland at the 2017 Hong Kong International Bowls Classic.
