= Paula Montgomery =

Irish lawn bowler

Personal information
- Nationality: British (Northern Irish)
- Citizenship: Irish
- Born: Paula Smith; 29 June 1971 (age 55) Belfast, Northern Ireland

Sport
- Sport: Bowls
- Club: NI Civil Service BC
- Partner: Alan Montgomery
Medal record
Representing combined Ireland
Atlantic Bowls Championships
Bronze medal – third place	2011 Paphos	Fours
British Isles Championships
Gold medal – first place	2010	Pairs
Gold medal – first place	2002	Triples

Paula Montgomery née Paula Smith (born 29 June 1971) is an Irish international lawn bowler.

== Biography ==
As Paula Smith, she represented Ireland at Under 25 level from 1991 to 1996, gaining 18 junior international caps. Montgomery then represented Ireland at Senior level from 1997 to 2004 before taking a three-year sabbatical and returning to international duty in 2008, competing each year in the British Isles Women's Home International Series, the most recent of which was 2019 and captained the International team in 2018 & 2019. She currently has 74 Senior International caps.

Montgomery has represented Northern Ireland at two Commonwealth Games; the first in the pairs event, as lead with Barbara Cameron at the 1998 Commonwealth Games in Kuala Lumpur. At the second, four years later at the 2002 Commonwealth Games in Manchester, she played 2nd in the fours event with Alicia Weir, Dessa Baird and Pat Horner, reaching the quarter finals.

Montgomery has also represented Ireland at various international events including the Atlantic Bowls Championships in Llandrindod Wells, Wales (1997) and Paphos, Cyprus (2011) where she won the fours bronze medal. In 2012, she represented Ireland at the 2012 World Outdoor Bowls Championship in Adelaide, Australia competing in the pairs and the fours events.

At national level she won the 2002 and 2009 pairs titles and 2001 triples title at the Irish National Bowls Championships and subsequently won two British Isles Bowls Championships triples in the 2002 and pairs in 2010. Additionally she won the Irish U25 singles in 1994, 1995 & 1997 (as Paula Smith).

Montgomery was assistant manager to the Under 25 Women's Irish International team in 2014 and has been part of the coaching and selection committee since then.

== Personal life ==
She is married to former Irish International bowler Alan Montgomery.
