= Geraldine Law =

Northern Irish international lawn bowler

Personal information
- Nationality: British (Northern Irish)
- Born: 26 July 1967 (age 58)

Sport
- Sport: Lawn and indoor bowls
- Club: NI Civil Service BC, Belfast
Medal record
Representing Northern Ireland
Irish Nationals
Gold medal – first place	1994	pairs

Geraldine Law (born 26 July 1967) is a former international lawn and indoor bowler from Northern Ireland who competed at the Commonwealth Games.

== Biography ==
Law, a civil servant by profession, was a member of the NI Civil Service Bowls Club in Belfast and represented the combined Ireland team at international level.

Law won the 1996 Irish indoor title and her brother Trevor Law was also a successful indoor bowler.

Law represented the Northern Irish team at the 1998 Commonwealth Games in Kuala Lumpur, Malaysia, where she competed in the fours event, with Alicia Crangle, Donna McNally and Pat Horner.

She was the pairs champion of Ireland (with Pat Horner) at the 1994 Irish National Bowls Championships.
