= George Best (bowls) =

Northern Irish lawn bowler

Personal information
- Nationality: Northern Irish
- Born: 13 April 1911 Belfast, Northern Ireland
- Died: 25 September 1994 (aged 83) Belfast, Northern Ireland

Sport
- Sport: Lawn bowls
- Club: Willowfield BC
Medal record
Representing Northern Ireland
National Championships
Gold medal – first place	1949	pairs
Gold medal – first place	1957	pairs
Gold medal – first place	1960	fours
Gold medal – first place	1961	fours

George Best (13 April 1911 – 25 September 1994), was an international lawn bowler from Northern Ireland who competed at the British Empire and Commonwealth Games (now Commonwealth Games).

== Biography ==
Best was first capped by Ireland at international level in 1946. He was a 21st president of the Willowfield Bowling Club of Belfast and was given the honour of re-opening the club's green at Gibson Park in April 1949.

It was also in 1949 that Best won the pairs championship of Ireland with Syd Thompson at the Irish National Bowls Championships and the duo won a second pairs title in 1957.

Best represented the 1958 Northern Irish team at the 1958 British Empire and Commonwealth Games in Cardiff, Wales in the fours event, with Gerry Crossey, Tom Henry and Jack Webb, where the team finished in eighth place.

Best and Thompson teamed up with William Greer and Fred Greer to win consecutive fours titles in 1960 and 1961. Also in 1961, Best was named captain of the Irish team for the 1961 internationals.

In 1962 he retired as honorary secretary of the Willowfield Club after nine years in the role. He was also the president of Linfield F.C. and died in 1994.
