= Alex Lightbody =

British lawn bowler

Personal information
- Full name: Alexander Lightbody
- Nationality: British
- Born: 1966 Newtownards, County Down
- Years active: 1982 - Present

Sport
- Sport: Lawn & Indoor bowls
- Club: Outdoors - Castle BC, Bangor BC, Pickie BC; Indoors - Belfast IBC
Medal record
Representing combined Ireland
British Isles Championships
Gold medal – first place	1993	singles
Irish National Bowls Championships
Gold medal – first place	1992	singles

Alex Lightbody (born 1966) is an international lawn bowler, who has represented Ireland (combined) and Northern Ireland at international level, playing for the highly successful Bangor Bowling Club from 1983 - 2001 Lightbody won numerous club and team titles, among which where six Irish Bowling Association Senior cups and two Inter club Championships, Lightbody also won the Inter Association senior series playing for the NIBA along with multiple senior division 1 and senior cup titles

== Bowls career ==
Lightbody won the Irish National Bowls Championships singles in 1992. Trailing in the final against Gary McCloy 14–9, he came back to secure a 21–15 victory. In doing so he became the first Bangor bowler since Billy Tate to win the title.

The 1992 Irish title qualified him for the 1993 British Isles Bowls Championships and he subsequently won the singles held in Worthing becoming the first Irish winner since David Corkill in 1980.

== Other titles ==
- Northern Ireland Bowls Association (NIBA) singles title: 1992
- Northern Ireland Bowls Association (NIBA) fours title: 1983
- Northern Ireland bowls Association (NIBA) Senior cup 1983 1885 1987 2001
- Northern Ireland Bowls Association (NIBA) Senior League Division1 1987 1990 1991 1993 1994 19951996 1997 1998 1999 2001
- Irish Bowling Association (IBA) Inter-Association Club Championship 1987 1990
- Irish Bowling Association (IBA) Senior Cup 1983 1987 1991 1992 1997 2000
- Belmont open pairs
- Belmont fours
- Belfast IBC Triples
- North Down IBC U25 singles, Pairs, Triples, Fours (2)
- Bangor BC Open Singles 1985,1986,1987
- Bangor BC Open pairs 1984, 1985,1986,1987,1988
- Bangor BC H, Cap Singles 1984

== European ranking ==
Lightbody has a Professional Bowls Association European ranking of 96 in 2021.
