= Maureen Mallon =

Northern Irish international lawn bowler

Personal information
- Nationality: British (Northern Irish)

Sport
- Sport: Lawn and indoor bowls
- Club: Lisnagarvey BC
Medal record
Representing combined Ireland
British Isles Championships
Gold medal – first place	1985	triples
Representing Northern Ireland
Irish Nationals
Gold medal – first place	1984, 1992	triples
Gold medal – first place	1991	fours

Maureen Mallon is a former international lawn bowler from Northern Ireland who competed at the Commonwealth Games.

== Biography ==
Mallon was a member of the Lisnagarvey Bowls Club and represented the combined Ireland team at international level.

Mallon represented the Northern Irish team at the 1986 Commonwealth Games in Edinburgh, Scotland, where she competed in the fours event, with Kathleen Megrath, Nan Allely and Hilda Hamilton.

She was a three-times champion of Ireland at the Irish National Bowls Championships, in the triples in 1984 and 1992 and the fours in 1991.

She subsequently qualified to represent Ireland at the British Isles Bowls Championships, winning the triples title in 1985.
