= Patricia Horner =

Northern Irish international lawn bowler

Personal information
- Nationality: British (Northern Irish)
- Born: 17 March 1947 (age 79)

Sport
- Sport: Lawn and indoor bowls
- Club: NI Civil Service BC, Belfast
Medal record
Representing Northern Ireland
Irish Nationals
Gold medal – first place	1994	pairs

Patricia "Pat" Horner (born 17 March 1947) is a former international lawn bowler from Northern Ireland who competed at two Commonwealth Games.

== Biography ==
Horner a nurse by profession, was a member of the NI Civil Service Bowls Club in Belfast and represented the combined Ireland team at international level.

Horner represented the Northern Irish team at the 1998 Commonwealth Games in Kuala Lumpur, Malaysia, where she competed in the fours event, with Alicia Crangle, Donna McNally and Geraldine Law.

Four years later Horner represented the Northern Irish team again at the 2002 Commonwealth Games in Manchester, England, where she competed in the fours event, with Alicia Weir (Crangle), Dessa Baird and Paula Montgomery.

She was the pairs champion of Ireland (with Geraldine Law) at the 1994 Irish National Bowls Championships.
