= Michael Nutt =

Irish lawn bowler

Personal information
- Nationality: British (Northern Irish)
- Born: 30 August 1966 (age 59)

Sport
- Club: Old Bleach BC
Medal record
Commonwealth Games
Bronze medal – third place	2002 Manchester	fours
Representing combined Ireland
British Isles Championships
Gold medal – first place	2002	fours

Michael Nutt is a male Irish international lawn bowler.

== Profile ==
Nutt was born in 1966 and taught Spanish and French at Ballyclare High School. He was selected by Northern Ireland to represent them at the 2002 Commonwealth Games in Manchester. He secured the bronze medal in the fours, with Noel Graham, Neil Booth and Jim Baker at the .

Nutt bowls for the Old Bleach Bowling Club and was the National triples champion in 2001 and 2019.
