= Kathleen Megrath =

Northern Irish international lawn bowler

Personal information
- Nationality: British (Northern Irish)

Sport
- Sport: Lawn and indoor bowls
- Club: Belfast BC; Saintfield BC
Medal record
Representing combined Ireland
British Isles Championships
Gold medal – first place	1988	triples
Gold medal – first place	1985, 1986	fours
Representing Northern Ireland
Gold medal – first place	1985, 1987, 1989	triples
Gold medal – first place	1984, 1985	fours

Kathleen Megrath is a former international lawn bowler from Northern Ireland who competed at the Commonwealth Games.

== Biography ==
Megrath was initially a member of the Belfast Bowls Club and Belfast Indoors Bowls Club and represented the combined Ireland team at international level.

She was a five-times champion of Ireland at the Irish National Bowls Championships in the triples (1985, 1987 and 1989) and fours (1984, 1985). She subsequently qualified to represent Ireland at the British Isles Bowls Championships, winning the fours title in 1985 and 1986 and triples in 1988. The last of her national titles was with the Saintfield Bowls Club.

Megrath represented the Northern Irish team at the 1986 Commonwealth Games in Edinburgh, Scotland, where she competed in the fours event, with Hilda Hamilton, Nan Allely and Maureen Mallon.

After being left out of the Irish squad for the 1990 Home internationals she refused to travel to for the British Isles Championships forcing Ireland to concede their triples participation. Megrath received a two-year ban.
