= Simon Martin (bowls) =

Northern Irish international lawn bowler (born 1976)

Personal information
- Nationality: Northern Irish
- Born: 27 February 1976 (age 50) Northern Ireland

Sport
- Sport: Lawn bowls
- Club: Belmont BC

Achievements and titles
- Highest world ranking: 13 (March 2025)
Medal record
Representing combined Ireland
World Outdoor Championships
Bronze medal – third place	2016 Christchurch	fours
British Isles Championships
Gold medal – first place	2023	fours
European Championships
Gold medal – first place	2024 Ayr	pairs
Gold medal – first place	2024 Ayr	fours
Representing Northern Ireland
Irish Nationals
Gold medal – first place	2016, 2019, 2022	fours
Gold medal – first place	2021	singles
Gold medal – first place	2023	pairs
Gold medal – first place	2023	triples

Simon Matthew Martin (born 1976) is a Northern Irish international lawn bowler. He reached a career high ranking of world number 13 in March 2025.

== Bowls career ==
=== International ===
Martin was selected for the combined Irish team that competed in the 2016 World Outdoor Bowls Championship. He was part of the fours team with Martin McHugh, Neil Mulholland and Ian McClure that won a bronze medal in Christchurch.

Two years later, he was selected as part of the Northern Ireland team for the 2018 Commonwealth Games on the Gold Coast in Queensland.

=== National ===
Martin is a four times National champion after winning events at the Irish National Bowls Championships, which included the singles in 2021.

He also won the fours gold in 2016, 2019 and 2022.

In 2023, he won the fours title, with Ryan Cavan, Nigel Beggs & Paul Daly at the British Isles Bowls Championships, held in Ayr. He followed this up in September 2023, when he won his 5th and 6th national titles; the pairs (with Paul Daly) and the triples (with Daly and Mark McPeak).

Martin won double gold in the pairs and fours at the 2024 European Bowls Championships.
