= Victor Dallas =

Northern Irish international lawn bowler

Personal information
- Nationality: British (Northern Irish)
- Born: 1958 (age 67–68) Coleraine, Northern Ireland

Sport
- Sport: Lawn and indoor bowls
- Club: Coleraine BC
Medal record
Representing Northern Ireland
Commonwealth Games
Bronze medal – third place	1994 Victoria	fours

Victor Noel Dallas is a former international lawn and indoor bowler from Northern Ireland who competed at the Commonwealth Games.

== Biography ==
Dallas competed in the pairs event at the 1990 Commonwealth Games in Auckland, New Zealand.

Four years later Dallas represented the Northern Irish team at the 1994 Commonwealth Games in Victoria, Canada. He competed in the fours event, with Ian McClure, Noel Graham and John McCloughlin and won a bronze medal.

He was named President of the Coleraine Bowling Club in 2010, a position that both his father Noel Dallas and his son Jordan Dallas have held.
