= Mark McPeak =

Irish lawn bowler

Personal information
- Nationality: Northern Irish
- Born: 16 June 1968 (age 58)

Sport
- Club: Belmont BC
Medal record
Representing Northern Ireland
Commonwealth Games
Silver medal – second place	2006 Melbourne	triples
Representing combined Ireland
Atlantic Bowls Championships
Silver medal – second place	2011 Paphos	fours
British Isles Championships
Gold medal – first place	2001	fours
Irish Nationals
Gold medal – first place	2000	fours
Gold medal – first place	2003	fours
Gold medal – first place	2021	fours
Gold medal – first place	2023	triples

Mark Brian McPeak (born 1968) is an Irish international lawn and indoor bowler born in Northern Ireland.

== Bowls career ==
He won a silver medal in the Men's triples at the 2006 Commonwealth Games in Thornbury, Victoria. McPeak competed in the triples and fours at the 2011 Atlantic Bowls Championships in Cyprus, winning a silver medal in the latter.

He is a four times National champion, winning the fours title with his club Belmont, at the Irish National Bowls Championships in 2000, 2003 and 2021. He was also the 2016 singles runner-up behind Barry Kane.

On 2 September 2023, McPeak won his fourth national title, when winning the triples with Simon Martin and Paul Daly.
