= Richard Leonard (bowls) =

Bowler from Northern Ireland

Personal information
- Nationality: Irish

Sport
- Club: Crumlin BC
Medal record
Representing combined Ireland
British Isles Championships
Gold medal – first place	2011	singles

Richard Leonard is an Irish international lawn bowler and former British champion.

== Biography ==
Leonard won the Irish National Bowls Championships singles in 2010, bowling for St James Gate BC and subsequently won the singles at the British Isles Bowls Championships in 2011.

He was also the Irish pairs champion in 2004, singles runner up in 2019, and triples winner in 2009 and 2010 and fours champion in 2013.

Leonard won his sixth national title after winning the fours with his club Crumlin during the 2024 Irish Nationals and then completed a double to make it eight the following year in 2025, claiming the singles and retaining the fours with Robbie Maher, Eamon Carruth and Shane Leonard.
