= Gary McCloy =

Irish international lawn and indoor bowler

Personal information
- Nationality: British (Northern Irish)
- Born: 28 May 1969 (age 57)

Sport
- Club: Portrush
Medal record
Lawn bowls
Representing combined Ireland
World Outdoor Championships
Bronze medal – third place	2000 Johannesburg	Triples
Atlantic Bowls Championships
Silver medal – second place	2007 Ayr	pairs
European Championships
Bronze medal – third place	2011 Portugal	pairs
British Isles Championships
Gold medal – first place	2023	triples
Representing Northern Ireland
Commonwealth Games
Gold medal – first place	1998 Kuala Lumpur	Fours
Irish Nationals
Gold medal – first place	1990	triples
Gold medal – first place	1994	singles
Gold medal – first place	2002	triples
Gold medal – first place	2019	singles
Gold medal – first place	2022	triples

Gary Samuel McCloy (born 28 May 1969) is an Irish international lawn and indoor bowler.

== Bowls career ==
He won a bronze medal in the fours at the 2000 World Outdoor Bowls Championship in Johannesburg.

He was also part of the fours team that secured the gold medal for Northern Ireland at the 1998 Commonwealth Games in Kuala Lumpur, Malaysia, the other members were Ian McClure, Martin McHugh and Neil Booth.

In 2007 he won the pairs silver medal at the Atlantic Bowls Championships.

He also won the 1994 and 2019 Irish National Bowls Championships singles title.

In 2022, he won his fifth national title when winning the triples at the Irish National Bowls Championships.

In 2023, he won the triples title, with Derek Smith & Ian McClure at the British Isles Bowls Championships, held in Ayr.

== Personal life ==
He is married to fellow Irish international bowler Donna McNally and they run the Ballybrakes bowls shop within the Ballybrakes Community Bowls Club.
