= Davy Hamilton =

Northern Irish international lawn bowler

Personal information
- Nationality: British (Northern Irish)

Sport
- Sport: Lawn and indoor bowls
- Club: Belmont BC
Medal record
Representing combined Ireland
British Isles Championships
Gold medal – first place	1997	triples
Representing Northern Ireland
Irish Nationals
Gold medal – first place	1996	triples
Gold medal – first place	2003	fours

Davy Hamilton is a former international lawn bowler from Northern Ireland who competed at the Commonwealth Games.

== Biography ==
Hamilton was a member of the Belmont Bowls Club and represented the combined Ireland team at international level. Indoors, Hamilton skipped the Belmont four that won the 1984 national championships and subsequently represented Ireland at the 1985 British Isles Bowls Championships.

Hamilton represented the Northern Irish team at the 1986 Commonwealth Games in Edinburgh, Scotland, where he competed in the pairs event with Rodney McCutcheon.

In July 1988 he reached the final of both the singles and pairs at the City of Belfast championships and in September 1988 won both the singles and pairs at the Ballymena BC Championships.

He was the champion of Ireland two times at the Irish National Bowls Championships, winning the triples in 1996 and the fours in 2003 and subsequently qualified to represent Ireland at the British Isles Bowls Championships, where they won the triples title in 1997.
