= Jack Webb (bowls) =

Northern Irish lawn bowler

Personal information
- Nationality: Northern Irish
- Born: unknown
- Died: 23 February 1983 Belfast, Northern Ireland

Sport
- Sport: Lawn bowls
- Club: Musgrave BC; Falls BC
Medal record
Representing Northern Ireland
British Isles Championships
Gold medal – first place	1963	fours
Gold medal – first place	1969	fours
National Championships
Gold medal – first place	1950	pairs
Gold medal – first place	1955	singles
Gold medal – first place	1958	singles
Gold medal – first place	1962	fours
Gold medal – first place	1968	fours

Jack Webb (date of birth unknown – 23 February 1983), was an international lawn bowler from Northern Ireland who competed at the British Empire and Commonwealth Games (now Commonwealth Games).

== Biography ==
Webb was a member of the Musgrave Bowling Club of Belfast and in 1950 won the pairs championship of Ireland with Alex Carr, at the Irish National Bowls Championships. He then won the singles championship of Ireland after winning the title in 1955 and 1958.

Webb represented the 1958 Northern Irish team at the 1958 British Empire and Commonwealth Games in Cardiff, Wales in the fours event, with Gerry Crossey, Tom Henry and George Best, where the team finished in eighth place.

Webb won the Musgrave singles championship for eight consecutive seasons and in 1959, Webb became the president of the Musgrave club.

Webb left the Musgrave club and became a member of the Falls Bowling Club, with whom he won two rinks national titles in 1962 and 1968. The successes qualified the quartet for the British Isles Bowls Championships on each of the following seasons and the Falls BC bowlers duly won both British Isles titles in 1963 and 1969.

He died on 23 February 1983.
