= Billy Pimley =

Northern Irish international lawn bowler

Personal information
- Nationality: Northern Irish
- Born: 24 November 1919 Belfast, Northern Ireland
- Died: 30 May 2023 (aged 103) Belfast, Northern Ireland

Sport
- Sport: Lawn bowls
- Club: Falls BC

William "Billy" Pimley (24 November 1919 – 30 May 2023) was an international lawn bowler from Northern Ireland who competed at the Commonwealth Games.

== Biography ==
Pimley was educated at St Malachy's College and was a member of the Falls Bowls Club in Belfast and made his international debut in 1971.

Pimley was a three-times runner-up in the Irish National Bowls Championships; in the singles behind David Marchant of Leinster in 1972 and the pairs in 1968 and 1969.

Pimley represented the Northern Irish team at the 1974 British Commonwealth Games in Christchurch, New Zealand, where he competed in the pairs event, with Billy Tate.

In November 2019 he visited his old school shortly before celebrating his 100th birthday.
