= Roy Fulton =

Scottish-born Irish international lawn bowler (1916–2000)

Personal information
- Full name: Robert Fulton
- Born: 14 June 1916 Whiteinch, Glasgow, Scotland
- Died: 29 September 2000 (aged 84) Prestwick, South Ayrshire, Scotland

Sport
- Club: Coleraine BC
Medal record
Representing Ireland
World Outdoor Championships
Bronze medal – third place	1966 Kyeemagh	singles
Representing Northern Ireland
Commonwealth Games
Bronze medal – third place	1970 Edinburgh	singles
British Isles Championships
Gold medal – first place	1968	singles
Gold medal – first place	1967	pairs
Gold medal – first place	1968	pairs

Robert Fulton (14 June 1916 – 29 September 2000) was a Scottish international lawn bowler who represented Ireland.

== Bowls career ==
Fulton represented a combined Ireland team at the first World Bowls Championship in Kyeemagh, New South Wales, Australia in 1966 and won a bronze medal in the singles at the championship.

In addition he won a bronze medal at the 1970 British Commonwealth Games in Edinburgh and represented Northern Ireland at the Lawn Bowls at the 1958 British Empire and Commonwealth Games and Lawn bowls at the 1974 British Commonwealth Games.

Fulton was also seven time singles champion at the Irish National Bowls Championships (1956, 1957, 1962, 1964, 1965 1967, 1971) in addition to six pairs (1951, 1963, 1964, 1966, 1967, 1973). He also won the singles at the British Isles Bowls Championships in 1968.

== Personal life and death ==
Fulton was born in Whiteinch, Glasgow on 14 June 1916, to Robert Fulton Sr. and Mary Fulton (née Hutchinson). He was a rugby player at Hillhead High School and a Scottish schoolboys billiards international. He took up bowling in 1946 before switching allegiance to Ireland.

Fulton died in Prestwick, South Ayrshire on 29 September 2000, at the age of 84.
