= Bernie O'Neill (bowls) =

Bowler from Northern Ireland

Personal information
- Nationality: Northern Irish
- Born: Northern Ireland

Sport
- Sport: Lawn bowls
- Club: Portstewart BC
Medal record
Representing combined Ireland
World Outdoor Championships
Bronze medal – third place	2008 Christchurch	pairs
Bronze medal – third place	2008 Christchurch	fours
Atlantic Bowls Championships
Bronze medal – third place	2009 Johannesburg	fours
Bronze medal – third place	2009 Johannesburg	pairs
Gold medal – first place	2015 Paphos	triples
British Isles Championships
Gold medal – first place	2005	pairs
Irish Nationals
Gold medal – first place	1999	singles
Gold medal – first place	2004	pairs
Gold medal – first place	2014	singles
Gold medal – first place	2016	singles
Gold medal – first place	2024	triples

Bernadette O'Neill is a Northern Irish international lawn bowler.

== Bowls career ==
=== International ===
O'Neill won the bronze medal in the fours and pairs at the 2008 World Outdoor Bowls Championship in Christchurch, New Zealand. In addition she won a gold medal at the World Champion of Champions in the triples.

In 2009, she won the fours and pairs bronze medals at the Atlantic Bowls Championships and in 2015 she won the triples gold medal at the Atlantic Bowls Championships.

=== National ===
O'Neill won three singles titles at the Irish National Bowls Championships bowling for the Portstewart Bowls Club, in 1999, 2014 and 2016. She also won the pairs in 2004 and the triples in 2024.
