= Jackie Smyth (bowls) =

Northern Irish international lawn bowler

Personal information
- Nationality: British (Northern Irish)
- Born: c.1967

Sport
- Sport: Lawn and indoor bowls
- Club: Magherafelt BC; Portrush BC
Medal record
Representing Northern Ireland
British Isles Championships
Gold medal – first place	1993	triples
Irish Nationals
Gold medal – first place	1992	triples

Jackie Smyth (born c. 1967) is a former international lawn bowler from Northern Ireland who competed at the Commonwealth Games.

== Biography ==
Smyth started bowling at the age of 13 and was a member of the Magherafelt Bowls Club. In 1994 he became the club president; his profession at the time was a sales manager with Sperrin Metals. Smyth won three Irish U25 titles in 1986, 1987 and 1991 and the British U25 singles in 1992.

Smyth represented the Northern Irish team at the 1994 Commonwealth Games in Victoria, Canada, where he competed in the singles event.

He was the triples champion of Ireland at the 1992 Irish National Bowls Championships and subsequently qualified to represent Ireland at the British Isles Bowls Championships, winning the triples title in 1993 with Eric Sands and his father Willie Smyth.

As of 2025 he was bowling for the Portrush Bowling Club and won his third Irish Senior Cup.
