= Graham McKee =

Irish international lawn & indoor bowler (born 1980)

Personal information
- Nationality: British (Northern Irish)
- Born: Belfast, Northern Ireland

Sport
- Sport: indoor and lawn bowls
- Club: Sydenham (outdoors); County Antrim (indoors)
Medal record
Representing combined Ireland
Atlantic Bowls Championships
Silver medal – second place	2011 Paphos	fours

Graham McKee (born 1980) is an Irish international lawn & indoor bowler.

== Bowls career ==
mcKee was capped by the combined Irish team and competed in the triples and fours at the 2011 Atlantic Bowls Championships in Cyprus, winning a silver medal in the latter.

In 2018, he held a career high world indoor ranking of 20.

He has qualified for the World Indoor Bowls Championships in 2017, 2018 and 2019 and is twice a National champion after winning the pairs (2010) and fours (2015) at the Irish National Bowls Championships.
