= Paul Daly (bowls) =

Northern Irish international lawn bowler

Personal information
- Nationality: Northern Irish
- Born: 28 March 1972 (age 54) Belfast, Northern Ireland

Sport
- Club: Belmont BC; Ulster Transport BC
Medal record
Representing Ireland combined
Men's lawn bowls
World Outdoor Championships
Bronze medal – third place	2012 Adelaide	Men's triples
Bronze medal – third place	2012 Adelaide	Men's fours
British Isles Championships
Gold medal – first place	1997	triples
Gold medal – first place	2012	singles
Gold medal – first place	2023	fours
Representing Northern Ireland
Commonwealth Games
Silver medal – second place	2014 Glasgow	Men's triples
Irish Nationals
Gold medal – first place	1993	fours
Gold medal – first place	1996	triples
Gold medal – first place	2005	triples
Gold medal – first place	2011	singles
Gold medal – first place	2011	triples
Gold medal – first place	2022	fours
Gold medal – first place	2023	pairs
Gold medal – first place	2023	triples

Paul Daly (born 28 March 1972) is a Northern Irish international lawn bowler.

== Bowls career ==
=== International ===
Daly won a silver medal in the men's triples at the 2014 Commonwealth Games. He also won a bronze medal in the triples and fours at the 2012 World Outdoor Bowls Championship.

=== National Championships ===
Daly is an eight times Irish National Bowls Championships winner, including winning the singles title in 2011, bowling for Ulster Transport Bowls Club.

His first title came in 1993 in the fours for Belmont BC and followed this up in 1996 when winning the triples in 1996, again for Belmont. Nine years later in 2005, he won the triples bowling for Ulster Transport BC. In 2011, he won the triples in addition to the singles. He later switched clubs moving back to the Belmont club.

In 2022, he won his sixth national title when winning the fours at the Irish National Bowls Championships. The following year in 2023, he won the fours title, with Ryan Cavan, Nigel Beggs & Simon Martin at the British Isles Bowls Championships, held in Ayr.

On 2 September 2023, Daly won two more national titles; the pairs (with Simon Martin) and the triples (with Martin and Mark McPeak).
