= David Copeland (bowls) =

Northern Irish international lawn bowler

Personal information
- Nationality: Northern Irish
- Born: 1980 Northern Ireland

Sport
- Sport: Bowls
- Club: Dunbarton BC, Gilford
Medal record
Representing combined Ireland
World Singles Champion of Champions
Gold medal – first place	2025 Barham	Men's singles

David Copeland (born 1980) is a Northern Irish international lawn bowler who became the World Singles Champion of Champions in 2025.

== Biography ==
Copeland won his first Irish national bowls title in 2013, with Conor McCartan and D.J. Wilson, as part of the Dunbarton Bowls Club triples.

In 2024 he defeated Kyle Blakely of Banbridge in the final of the national singles.

By virtue of winning the national singles, Copeland represented Team Ireland at the 2025 World Singles Champion of Champions and went on to become world champion after qualifying from section 3 and then defeating Jacob Nelson, Iain McLean and then Rajnesh Prasad of Fiji in the final to claim the crown.
