= Gerry Crossey =

Northern Irish lawn bowler

Personal information
- Nationality: Northern Irish
- Born: 1910 Lurgan, Northern Ireland
- Died: April 1989 (aged 78–79) Lurgan, Northern Ireland

Sport
- Sport: Lawn bowls
- Club: Falls BC, Belfast
Medal record
Representing Northern Ireland
British Isles Championships
Gold medal – first place	1963	fours
Gold medal – first place	1969	fours
National Championships
Gold medal – first place	1954	pairs
Gold medal – first place	1961	pairs
Gold medal – first place	1962	fours
Gold medal – first place	1968	fours
Gold medal – first place	1972	fours

Patrick Gerard Crossey (1910 – April 1989), was an international lawn bowler from Northern Ireland who competed at the British Empire and Commonwealth Games (now Commonwealth Games).

== Biography ==
Crossey was a member of the Falls Bowling Club of Belfast and in 1954 won the pairs championship of Ireland at the Irish National Bowls Championships, partnering Jimmy Burns.

Crossey represented the 1958 Northern Irish team at the 1958 British Empire and Commonwealth Games in Cardiff, Wales in the fours event, with Tom Henry, George Best and Jack Webb, where the team finished in eighth place.

Crossey went on to win four more national titles in 1961 (pairs), 1962, 1968 and 1972 (fours), in addition to claiming two British Isles Bowls Championships in 1963 and 1969.

He died in April 1989.
