= Sarah Kelly (bowls) =

Irish lawn bowler

Personal information
- Nationality: Irish
- Born: 1986

Sport
- Sport: Lawn bowls
- Club: Crumlin BC (outdoors)
Medal record
European Championships
Silver medal – second place	2022 Ayr	pairs
British Isles Championships
Gold medal – first place	2024	singles
Irish Nationals
Gold medal – first place	2016, 2018	fours
Gold medal – first place	2018, 2019, 2024, 2025	pairs
Gold medal – first place	2023	singles

Sarah Kelly (born 1986) is an Irish international lawn bowler.

== Bowls career ==
Kelly has won seven National championships after winning one singles, four pairs titles and two fours titles at the Irish National Bowls Championships. Six of the titles were won with her mother Noeleen Kelly (Kelly being a member of the fours team and the partner in the pairs). Sarah has also captained Ireland.

In 2020, she was selected for the 2020 World Outdoor Bowls Championship in Australia but the event was cancelled due to the COVID-19 pandemic. In 2022, she won pairs silver at the European Bowls Championships.

In 2023, she won her fifth national title, after winning the singles at the Irish national finals.

Shortly afterwards in 2023, she was selected as part of the team to represent Ireland at the 2023 World Outdoor Bowls Championship. She participated in the women's pairs and the women's fours events.

In 2024, she won the singles title at the British Isles Bowls Championships. She then successfully retained her Irish pairs title at the 2025 nationals in Lurgan.
