= Daisy Fraser =

Northern Irish international lawn bowler

Personal information
- Nationality: British (Northern Irish)

Sport
- Sport: Lawn and indoor bowls
- Club: Donaghadee BC
Medal record
Representing combined Ireland
British Isles Championships
Gold medal – first place	1978	pairs
Representing Northern Ireland
Irish Nationals
Gold medal – first place	1977	pairs
Gold medal – first place	1979	pairs

Daisy Fraser is a former international lawn and indoor bowler from Northern Ireland who competed at the Commonwealth Games.

== Biography ==
Fraser was a member of the Donaghadee Bowls Club. She was the pairs champion of Ireland with Nan Allely in 1977 and 1979 at the Irish National Bowls Championships and subsequently became the British champion after winning the 1978 pairs at the British Isles Bowls Championships.

Fraser represented the Northern Irish team at the 1982 Commonwealth Games in Brisbane, Australia, where he competed in the triples event, with Eileen Bell and Nan Allely.

Fraser also bowled indoors and was a British Isles pairs champion.
