= John Rusk (bowls) =

Irish lawn bowls player

Personal information
- Nationality: Northern Irish
- Born: c.1865 Belfast, Northern Ireland
- Died: 28 January 1938 Belfast, Northern Ireland

Sport
- Sport: Lawn bowls
- Club: Shaftesbury BC; Belfast BC; Cavehill BC
Medal record
Men's Lawn bowls
Representing Northern Ireland
National Championships
| Gold medal – first place | 1909 | fours |
| Gold medal – first place | 1912 | fours |
| Gold medal – first place | 1913 | fours |
| Gold medal – first place | 1923 | pairs |
| Gold medal – first place | 1932 | singles |

John Rusk (c.1865 – 28 January 1938) was a prominent doctor and lawn bowls international from Northern Ireland who competed at the British Empire Games (now the Commonwealth Games). He was President of the Irish Bowling Association in 1912.

== Biography ==
Rusk studied at Royal Academy of Medicine in Ireland and the Queen's University Belfast. He joined Shaftesbury Bowling Club in 1899 before joining Belfast Bowling Club from 1905 until 1917.

In 1909, 1912 and 1913 he won the fours championship of Ireland with Belfast BC. He then joined Cavehill BC, with whom he won the inaugural national pairs with Bobbie Campbell in 1923.

Rusk won the prestigious national singles title in 1932 before representing the 1934 Northern Irish Team at the 1934 British Empire Games in London, participating in the singles event.

Rusk was a well known medical practitioner in Belfast, running his own practice. He died on 28 January 1938 at his home at 228 Antrim Road in Belfast.

The singles championship at the Irish National Bowls Championships was named after him.
