= Dessa Baird =

Northern Irish international lawn bowler

Personal information
- Nationality: British (Northern Irish)
- Born: 26 August 1956

Sport
- Sport: Lawn and indoor bowls
- Club: Limavady BC
Medal record
Representing Northern Ireland
Irish Nationals
Gold medal – first place	2013, 2023	fours

Dessa Baird (born 26 August 1956), is a former international lawn bowler from Northern Ireland who competed at the Commonwealth Games.

== Biography ==
Baird was a member of the Limavady Bowls Club and represented the combined Ireland team at international level.

Baird represented the Northern Irish team at the 2002 Commonwealth Games in Manchester, England, where she competed in the fours event, with Alicia Weir, Pat Horner and Paula Montgomery.

She was twice the fours champion of Ireland, winning the titles at the 2013 and 2023 Irish National Bowls Championships.
