= Phillis Nolan =

Irish lawn bowler (1946–2022)

Personal information
- Nationality: Irish
- Born: 10 February 1946 Bray, County Wicklow, Ireland
- Died: 16 March 2022 (aged 76) Dublin, Ireland

Sport
- Club: Bray BC (1972-77); Blackrock BC (1978-)
Medal record
Representing combined Ireland
World Outdoor Bowls Championships
Gold medal – first place	1988 Auckland	pairs
Bronze medal – third place	1988 Auckland	team
Gold medal – first place	1992 Ayr	pairs
Silver medal – second place	1992 Ayr	team
Gold medal – first place	1996 Leamington Spa	pairs
Atlantic Bowls Championships
Gold medal – first place	1993 Florida	pairs
Bronze medal – third place	1995 Durban	singles
Bronze medal – third place	1995 Durban	pairs
Silver medal – second place	1997 Llandrindod Wells	pairs
British Isles Championships
Gold medal – first place	1992	singles
Gold medal – first place	1993	singles
Gold medal – first place	1995	fours
Gold medal – first place	1996	fours
Gold medal – first place	2005	singles

Phillis Nolan (10 February 1946 – 16 March 2022) was an Irish lawn bowler.

== Bowls career ==
=== World Outdoor Championship ===
Nolan partnered Margaret Johnston in a very successful pairs team and they won three consecutive World Outdoor Bowls Championships gold medals. The three world titles came at the 1988 World Outdoor Bowls Championship, 1992 World Outdoor Bowls Championship and the 1996 World Outdoor Bowls Championship.

=== Atlantic Championships ===
In 1993, she won the pairs gold medal with Barbara Cameron at the inaugural Atlantic Bowls Championships. She went on to win three more medals at the Championships.

=== British Isles ===
She also won the British Isles Bowls Championships singles title three times in 1992, 1993 and 2005, a record only bettered by fellow Irish bowler Margaret Johnston

At the Irish National Bowls Championships bowling for the Blackrock Bowls Club, she won the singles title six times (1989, 1991, 1992, 1997, 2004, 2007), the pairs in 1983, 1992, 1996, 2005 the triples in 1986 & 2014 and the fours in 1979, 1994, 1995 and 2000.

=== Family ===
Her son John Nolan was the 1991 singles champion at the Irish National Bowls Championships.
