= Eileen Bell (bowls) =

Irish lawn and indoors bowls player

Personal information
- Nationality: British (Northern Irish)
- Born: 1936 (age 89–90) Ballynahinch, Northern Ireland

Sport
- Sport: Lawn and indoor bowls
- Club: Ballynahinch BC; Belfast BC/Shaws Bridge BC
Medal record
Representing Ireland
World Outdoor Championships
Gold medal – first place	1981 Toronto	pairs
Bronze medal – third place	1988 Auckland	team
British Isles Championships
Gold medal – first place	1974	singles
Gold medal – first place	1983	singles
Gold medal – first place	1986	singles
Gold medal – first place	1988	triples
Gold medal – first place	1985	fours
Gold medal – first place	1986	fours

Eileen Bell (born 1936) is a former Irish lawn and indoor bowler.

== Biography ==
Bell started bowling in the 1960s in her home town of Ballynahinch, Northern Ireland. Bell won the 1981 World Outdoor Bowls Championship pairs Gold in Toronto when partnering Nan Allely. She bowled for the Belfast BC (outdoors) and Shaws Bridge (indoors).

Bell represented the Northern Irish team at the 1982 Commonwealth Games in Brisbane, Australia, where she competed in the triples event, with Nan Allely and Daisy Fraser.

Bell represented the Northern Irish team again at the 1986 Commonwealth Games in Edinburgh, Scotland, where she competed in the singles event.

Bell is the winner of nine Irish National Bowls Championships and has been three times British Isles Bowls Championships singles title holder (1974, 1983 & 1986), a record only bettered by fellow Irish bowler Margaret Johnston. In addition she has also won a triples and fours title.
