= Aaron Tennant =

Northern Irish lawn bowler (born 1991)

Personal information
- Nationality: British (Northern Irish)
- Born: 1991

Sport
- Sport: Lawn bowls
- Club: Ballymoney BC (outdoors)
Medal record
Representing combined Ireland
Atlantic Bowls Championships
Bronze medal – third place	2015 Paphos	triples
Bronze medal – third place	2015 Paphos	fours
Bronze medal – third place	2019 Cardiff	triples
British Isles Championships
Gold medal – first place	2018	pairs
European Championships
Bronze medal – third place	2015 Israel	mixed
Gold medal – first place	2022 Ayr	triples
Bronze medal – third place	2022 Ayr	fours

Aaron Tennant (born 1991) is a Northern Irish lawn bowler.

== Bowls career ==
Tennant won the triples and fours bronze medals at the 2015 Atlantic Bowls Championships.

He won the British Isles Pairs with Gary Kelly and the 2018 Hong Kong International Bowls Classic doubles with Ian McClure. He is also a three time National Champion winning a pairs, triples and fours title at the Irish National Bowls Championships.

In 2019, he won the fours bronze medal at the Atlantic Bowls Championships and in 2020 he was selected for the 2020 World Outdoor Bowls Championship in Australia but the event was cancelled due to the COVID-19 pandemic.

In 2022, he won two medals (a triples gold and fours bronze) at the European Bowls Championships.
