= Clifford Craig =

Irish lawn bowler

Personal information
- Nationality: British (Northern Irish)
- Born: 1963 Belfast
- Education: Lisnasharragh High School
- Occupation: Electrician

Sport
- Sport: Bowls
- Club: Balmoral BC
Medal record
Representing combined Ireland
Atlantic Bowls Championships
Silver medal – second place	2007 Ayr	pairs
British Isles Championships
Gold medal – first place	1999	singles
Gold medal – first place	1990	triples

Clifford Craig (born 1963) is an Irish international lawn bowler and former British champion.

== Bowls career ==
Craig won the Irish National Bowls Championships singles in 1998 and subsequently won the singles at the British Isles Bowls Championships in 1999. He also won the 1989 Irish triples title.

In 2007 he won the pairs silver medal at the Atlantic Bowls Championships.
