= Tom Henry (bowls) =

Northern Irish lawn bowler

Personal information
- Nationality: Northern Irish
- Born: 1908 Ballymoney, Ireland
- Died: 3 March 2003 (aged 94–95)

Sport
- Sport: Lawn bowls Badminton
- Club: Londonderry BC
Medal record
Representing Northern Ireland
National Championships
| Gold medal – first place | 1952 | singles |
| Gold medal – first place | 1952 | pairs |
| Gold medal – first place | 1960 | pairs |
| Gold medal – first place | 1968 | fours |
| Gold medal – first place | 1972 | fours |

Thomas Lyle Henry (1908 – 3 March 2003), was an international lawn bowler and badminton player from Northern Ireland, who competed at the British Empire and Commonwealth Games (now Commonwealth Games).

== Biography ==
Henry, born in Ballymoney, Ireland, attended the Model School and St. James Church. He won honours at junior and senior level in badminton, winning the 1948 Scottish Open doubles with Frank Peard and earning 33 international caps.

After his badminton career, he concentrated on lawn bowls and having previously moved to Derry in 1939, he joined Londonderry Bowling Club, was capped by Ireland in 1948 and won the 1952 Irish National Bowls Championships singles and pairs title.

Henry represented the 1958 Northern Irish team at the 1958 British Empire and Commonwealth Games in Cardiff, Wales in the fours event, with Gerry Crossey, George Best and Jack Webb, where the team finished in eighth place.

He took a position with Edmiston and Co. in Shipquay Street, as a sports equipment manager and went on to win three more national titles, the pairs in 1960 and the fours in 1968 and 1972. He died in 2003.
