= Neil Mulholland =

Northern Irish international lawn bowler (born 1980)

Personal information
- Nationality: Northern Irish
- Born: 13 February 1980 (age 46) Lisburn, Northern Ireland

Sport
- Club: Lisnagarvey BC, Old Bleach BC
Medal record
Representing Northern Ireland
Commonwealth Games
Silver medal – second place	2014 Glasgow	Men's triples
Representing combined Ireland
World Outdoor Championships
Bronze medal – third place	2016 Christchurch	fours
World Singles Champion of Champions
Gold medal – first place	2015 Australia	Men's Singles
Atlantic Bowls Championships
Bronze medal – third place	2015 Paphos	triples
Bronze medal – third place	2015 Paphos	fours
Bronze medal – third place	2019 Cardiff	triples

Neil Mulholland (born 13 February 1980) is a Northern Irish international lawn bowler.

== Bowls career ==
He won a silver medal in the men's triples at the 2014 Commonwealth Games. In 2015 he won the triples and fours bronze medals at the Atlantic Bowls Championships.

In 2016 he was part of the fours team with Martin McHugh, Simon Martin and Ian McClure that won a bronze medal at the 2016 World Outdoor Bowls Championship in Christchurch.

He won the 2014 Irish National Bowls Championships singles and in 2015 he became the World Singles Champion of Champions defeating Fairul Izwan Abd Muin of Malaysia in the final.

In 2019 he won the fours bronze medal at the Atlantic Bowls Championships.
