= Stuart Bennett (bowls) =

Irish lawn bowler

Personal information
- Nationality: British (Northern Irish)

Sport
- Club: Belmont BC (outdoor); Belfast (indoor)

Achievements and titles
- Highest world ranking: 34 (September 2024)
Medal record
Representing Northern Ireland
Irish Nationals
Gold medal – first place	2016	singles
Gold medal – first place	2021	fours
Representing combined Ireland
World Outdoor Championships
Bronze medal – third place	2023 Gold Coast	triples
Bronze medal – third place	2023 Gold Coast	fours
Silver medal – second place	2023 Gold Coast	team
European Championships
Bronze medal – third place	2015 Israel	mixed pairs
Bronze medal – third place	2022 Ayr	fours

Stuart Bennett (born in Northern Ireland) is a combined Irish international lawn and indoor bowler.

== Bowls career ==
In 2012, Bennett became a National champion after winning the fours at the Irish National Bowls Championships bowling for the Belmont Bowls Club. In 2015, he won a bronze medal at the European Bowls Championships in Israel. In 2019, he was in the Irish team that won the Home International Bowls Championships.

He was due to make his debut at the World Championships during the 2021 World Indoor Bowls Championship competing in the singles and pairs but the event was cancelled. He did gain consolation however by winning a second National fours title in September 2021. In 2022, he won fours bronze at the European Championships.

In 2023, he was selected as part of the team to represent Ireland at the 2023 World Outdoor Bowls Championship. He participated in the men's triples and the men's fours events. In the triples with Ian McClure and Martin McHugh, he won the bronze medal. One week later he won a second bronze medal in the fours partnering McHugh, McClure and Adam McKeown. The team won their group but lost to Australia in the semi final.

== Personal life ==
He is a civil servant by trade.
