= Rodney McCutcheon =

Northern Irish international lawn bowler

Personal information
- Nationality: British (Northern Irish)
- Born: 3 April 1962 (age 64) Bangor, County Down, Northern Ireland

Sport
- Sport: Lawn bowls
- Club: Bangor BC
Medal record
Representing Ireland
World Outdoor Championships
Gold medal – first place	1988 Auckland	Men's fours
British Isles Championships
Gold medal – first place	1991	fours
Representing Northern Ireland
Commonwealth Games
Silver medal – second place	1990 Auckland	Men's fours

Rodney McCutcheon (born on 3 April 1962) is a former international lawn and indoor bowler from Northern Ireland who competed at the Commonwealth Games and won a gold medal at the world championships.

== Biography ==
McCutcheon was born in Bangor, County Down and as a schoolboy first played on the short mats. In 1982 he defeated Tony Allcock in the British Isles Under-25 singles championship.

He represented the Northern Irish team at the 1986 Commonwealth Games in Edinburgh, Scotland, where he competed in the pairs event, with Davy Hamilton.

His best moment came in the 1988 World Outdoor Bowls Championship when he won gold in the fours.

He won a silver with Northern Ireland at the 1990 Commonwealth Games in Auckland, New Zealand.
