= Sarah McAuley (bowls) =

Northern Irish international lawn bowler (born 1964)

Personal information
- Nationality: Northern Irish
- Born: 21 February 1964 (age 62) Derry, Northern Ireland

Sport
- Sport: Lawn bowls
- Club: County Antrim BC
Medal record
Irish Nationals
Gold medal – first place	2012	singles
Gold medal – first place	2018	triples

Sarah McAuley (born 21 February 1964) is a Northern Irish international lawn bowler.

== Career ==
She was born in Derry and was selected as part of the Northern Ireland team for the 2018 Commonwealth Games on the Gold Coast in Queensland.

McAuley has won two national titles at the Irish National Bowls Championships; the singles title in 2014 and the triples in 2018, when bowling for Ewarts.
