= Sandra Bailie =

Northern Irish lawn bowler

Sandra Bailie MBE
Personal information
- Nationality: British (Northern Irish)
- Born: 30 November 1960 (age 65) Northern Ireland

Sport
- Sport: Lawn & indoor bowls
- Club: Knock BC; NI Civil Service, Belfast
Medal record
Representing combined Ireland
Atlantic Bowls Championships
Bronze medal – third place	2009 Johannesburg	fours
Gold medal – first place	2015 Paphos	triples
Irish National Bowls Championships
Gold medal – first place	2008	fours
Gold medal – first place	2011	fours
Gold medal – first place	2012	triples
Gold medal – first place	2014	fours
Gold medal – first place	2016	pairs
Gold medal – first place	2016	triples
Gold medal – first place	2022	pairs

Sandra Hazel Bailie MBE (born 30 November 1960) is a Northern Irish international lawn and indoor bowler.

== Bowls career ==
=== Outdoor career ===
In 2009, she won the fours bronze medal at the Atlantic Bowls Championships and in 2015 she won the triples gold medal at the Atlantic Bowls Championships.

She won the 2016 (pairs), 2012 & 2016 (triples) and 2008, 2011 & 2014 fours titles at the Irish National Bowls Championships bowling for the Knock Bowls Club.

In 2016, she was selected as part of the Northern Ireland team for the 2018 Commonwealth Games on the Gold Coast in Queensland.

In 2022, Bailie won her seventh national title while bowling for NI Civil Service. She won the pairs with Alison Morris.

=== Indoor career ===
Bailie reached the final of the mixed pairs during the 2022 World Indoor Bowls Championship losing to Paul Foster and Alison Merrien.

== Honours and awards ==
Bailie was voted Belfast Sports Personality of the Year in 2017

She was appointed Member of the Order of the British Empire (MBE) in the 2023 New Year Honours for services to bowls.
