= Jennifer Dowds =

Northern Irish lawn bowler

Personal information
- Nationality: Northern Irish
- Born: 7 July 1959 (age 66) Ballymoney, Northern Ireland

Sport
- Sport: Lawn bowls
- Club: Ballymena BC
Medal record
Representing Ireland
World Outdoor Championships
Bronze medal – third place	2008 Christchurch	fours
Atlantic Bowls Championships
Bronze medal – third place	2007 Ayr	singles
Bronze medal – third place	2009 Johannesburg	pairs

Jennifer Dowds (born 7 July 1959) is a Northern Irish international lawn bowler.

== Bowls career ==
=== International ===
Dowds won the bronze medal in the fours at the 2008 World Outdoor Bowls Championship in Christchurch, New Zealand.

In 2007, she won the singles bronze medal at the Atlantic Bowls Championships and two years later won the pairs bronze medal at the 2009 Atlantic Bowls Championships.

=== National ===
Dowd won the 2005 singles title at the Irish National Bowls Championships.

Additionally, she won the 1995 and 1997 pairs titles and the 2012 fours title, at the Irish National Championships, bowling for the Ballymoney and Ballymena Bowls Clubs respectively.

In 2016, Dowds won the finals in both the pairs and triples of the Provincial Towns Women's Bowling Association Championships.
