= Neil Booth =

Northern Irish international lawn and indoor bowler

Personal information
- Nationality: British (Northern Irish)
- Born: 19 February 1968 (age 58) Ballymena, Co. Antrim, Northern Ireland

Sport
- Sport: Lawn and indoor bowls
- Club: Old Bleach BC
Medal record
Representing Ireland
World Outdoor Championships
Gold medal – first place	2004 Ayr	fours
Bronze medal – third place	2004 Ayr	team
Bronze medal – third place	2012 Adelaide	triples
Bronze medal – third place	2012 Adelaide	fours
British Isles Championships
Gold medal – first place	2002	fours
Representing Northern Ireland
Commonwealth Games
Gold medal – first place	1998 Kuala Lumpur	fours
Bronze medal – third place	2002 Manchester	fours
Silver medal – second place	2006 Melbourne	triples
Silver medal – second place	2014 Glasgow	triples

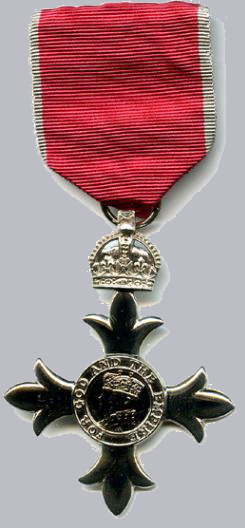
MBE insignia

Neil Booth MBE (born 19 February 1968) is a former Northern Irish international lawn and indoor bowler and bowls team coach and manager.

== Bowls career ==
Booth has won three World Championship medals starting with the gold medal in the fours at the 2004 World Outdoor Bowls Championship in Ayr with Jonathan Ross, Noel Graham and Jim Baker. This was followed by two bronze medals in 2012.

In addition Booth has won four Commonwealth Games medals. He won the gold medal in the fours at the 1998 Kuala Lumpur with Gary McCloy, Ian McClure and Martin McHugh. He won a bronze in 2002, a silver medal in 2006 and another silver in 2014.

Booth retired from international competition in 2014.

== Coaching ==
Booth was selected as a coach for the Northern Ireland team for the 2018 Commonwealth Games on the Gold Coast in Queensland. He was team manager for the 2020 World Outdoor Bowls Championship in Australia.

== Honours ==
- *: Member of the Order of the British Empire (2025)
