= Freda Elliott =

Northern Irish international lawn bowler

Personal information
- Nationality: British (Northern Irish)

Sport
- Sport: Lawn and indoor bowls
- Club: Belfast BC; Belmont BC; Knock BC
Medal record
Representing Ireland
World Outdoor Championships
Bronze medal – third place	1988 Auckland	team
Representing Northern Ireland
Commonwealth Games
Gold medal – first place	1986	pairs

Winifred "Freda" Elliott is a former international lawn bowler from Northern Ireland who competed at the Commonwealth Games and won a gold medal.

== Biography ==
Elliott represented the Northern Irish team at the 1986 Commonwealth Games in Edinburgh, Scotland, where she competed in the pairs event, with Margaret Johnston, winning the gold medal.

She has won six Irish National Bowls Championships titles in the pairs (1993), the triples (1982, 1998) and the fours (1982, 1988 and 1996).
