= Syd Thompson =

Irish bowls player (1912–1998)

Syd Thompson OBE
Personal information
- Nationality: British (Northern Irish)
- Born: 29 August 1912 Belfast, Northern Ireland
- Died: 1998 (aged 85–86) Belfast, Northern Ireland

Sport
- Sport: Lawn bowls
- Club: Willowfield BC
Medal record
Representing Northern Ireland
Lawn bowls
Commonwealth Games
Bronze medal – third place	1970 Edinburgh	pairs

Sydney "Syd" James Thompson (29 August 1912 – 1998) was an Irish international lawn and indoor bowler.

== Biography ==
Thompson was a member of the Willowfield Bowls Club.

Thompson served as the Northern Ireland Private Greens Bowling League (NIPGBL) president in 1974 and as Irish Bowling Association (IBA) and the British Isles Bowls Council (BIBC) president in 1964.

He won a bronze medal in the pairs at the 1970 Commonwealth Games in Edinburgh.

He played 78 times for the Irish outdoor team and 51 times for the indoor team and was awarded an O.B.E.

He won the 1950 singles title and 1949 & 1957 pairs title at the Irish National Bowls Championships when bowling for the Willowfield Bowls Club.
