= Ian McClure (bowls) =

Northern Irish bowls player

Personal information
- Nationality: Northern Irish
- Born: 23 August 1973 (age 52) Coleraine, Northern Ireland

Sport
- Club: Portrush BC

Achievements and titles
- Highest world ranking: 12 (June 2024)
Medal record
Representing Ireland combined
World Outdoor Championships
Bronze medal – third place	2000 Johannesburg	triples
Bronze medal – third place	2012 Adelaide	fours
Silver medal – second place	2016 Christchurch	pairs
Bronze medal – third place	2016 Christchurch	fours
Bronze medal – third place	2023 Gold Coast	triples
Bronze medal – third place	2023 Gold Coast	fours
Silver medal – second place	2023 Gold Coast	team
Atlantic Bowls Championships
Silver medal – second place	2011 Paphos	pairs
Silver medal – second place	2011 Paphos	fours
Gold medal – first place	2015 Paphos	pairs
Bronze medal – third place	2015 Paphos	fours
British Isles Championships
Gold medal – first place	1994	triples
Gold medal – first place	2013	singles
Gold medal – first place	2023	triples
Representing Northern Ireland
Irish Nationals
Gold medal – first place	1993, 2003	pairs
Gold medal – first place	1993, 2022	triples
Gold medal – first place	2008, 2012	singles
Commonwealth Games
Gold medal – first place	1998 Kuala Lumpur	fours
Gold medal – first place	2022 Birmingham	fours
Bronze medal – third place	1994 Victoria	fours
World Indoor Championships
Gold medal – first place	2004 Yarmouth	pairs

Ian McClure (born 23 August 1973) is an indoor and lawn bowler.

== Profile ==
Ian McClure is from Coleraine and began playing bowls in 1988 after being introduced to the sport by his father and the ex-international Willie Murray.

== Career ==
=== Commonwealth Games ===
McClure was part of the fours team that secured the gold medal for Northern Ireland at the 1998 Commonwealth Games in Kuala Lumpur, Malaysia, the other members were Gary McCloy, Martin McHugh and Neil Booth. Previously he had won a fours bronze in the 1994 Commonwealth Games. McClure was selected as part of the Northern Ireland team for the 2018 Commonwealth Games on the Gold Coast in Queensland.

In 2022, he competed in the men's triples and the men's fours at the 2022 Commonwealth Games. In the fours the team of McClure, Sam Barkley, Adam McKeown, Ian McClure and Martin McHugh won the gold medal defeating India in the final.

=== World Championships ===
McClure has won four medals at the World Championships; a triples bronze in the 2000 World Outdoor Bowls Championship and a fours bronze in the 2012 World Outdoor Bowls Championship. He won a silver medal for the combined Irish team with bowls pairs partner Gary Kelly in the pairs at the 2016 World Outdoor Bowls Championship and a fours bronze medal with Martin McHugh, Simon Martin and Neil Mulholland. In 2020, he was selected for the 2020 World Outdoor Bowls Championship in Australia but the event was cancelled due to the COVID-19 pandemic.

In 2023, he won the triples title, with Derek Smith & Gary McCloy at the British Isles Bowls Championships, held in Ayr. It was his third British Isles crown and second triples, which he last won 29 years previously. Later in 2023, he was selected as part of the team to represent Ireland at the 2023 World Outdoor Bowls Championship. He participated in the men's triples and the men's fours events. In the triples with Stuart Bennett and Martin McHugh, he won the bronze medal. He then won a second bronze medal in the fours event (partnering McHugh, Bennett and Adam McKeown) after winning their group but losing to Australia in the semi final.

=== National ===
McClure is a two time singles winner of the Irish National Bowls Championships (2008 & 2012) and subsequently won the singles at the British Isles Bowls Championships in 2013. In 2022, just one month after winning Commonwealth Games gold he won his sixth national title when winning the triples at the Irish National Bowls Championships.

=== Other ===
In 2011, he won the pairs and fours silver medals at the Atlantic Bowls Championships and in 2015 he won the pairs gold medal and the fours bronze medal at the Atlantic Bowls Championships. In 2018, he won the pairs with Aaron Tennant at the Hong Kong International Bowls Classic.
