= Martin McHugh (bowls) =

Northern Irish international lawn bowler (born 1973)

Personal information
- Nationality: British (Northern Irish)
- Born: 14 May 1973 (age 53)

Sport
- Sport: Lawn bowls
- Club: Whitehead BC (1996-2021); Old Bleach BC (2021-)
Medal record
Representing Ireland combined
World Outdoor Championships
Bronze medal – third place	2000 Johannesburg	triples
Bronze medal – third place	2016 Christchurch	fours
Bronze medal – third place	2023 Gold Coast	triples
Bronze medal – third place	2023 Gold Coast	fours
Silver medal – second place	2023 Gold Coast	team
Atlantic Bowls Championships
Silver medal – second place	2011 Paphos	fours
Bronze medal – third place	2015 Paphos	triples
Bronze medal – third place	2015 Paphos	fours
British Isles Championships
Gold medal – first place	2004	singles
Gold medal – first place	2005	singles
Gold medal – first place	2016	singles
Gold medal – first place	2007	pairs
Representing Northern Ireland
Commonwealth Games
Gold medal – first place	1998 Kuala Lumpur	fours
Gold medal – first place	2022 Birmingham	fours

Hugh Martin McHugh (born 14 May 1973) is a Northern Irish international lawn bowler.

== Bowls career ==
=== World Championships ===
McHugh competed in five successive World Bowls Championships in 2000, 2008, 2012 and 2016 and 2023. He won a triples bronze medal in the 2000 World Outdoor Bowls Championship and in 2016, was part of the combined Irish fours team with Simon Martin, Neil Mulholland and Ian McClure that won a bronze medal in Christchurch. In 2020, he was selected for the 2020 World Outdoor Bowls Championship in Australia but the event was cancelled due to the COVID-19 pandemic.

In 2023, he was selected as part of the team to represent Ireland at the 2023 World Outdoor Bowls Championship. He participated in the men's triples and the men's fours events. In the triples with Ian McClure and Stuart Bennett, he won the bronze medal. He then won a second bronze medal in the fours event (partnering McClure, Bennett and Adam McKeown) after winning their group but losing to Australia in the semi final.

=== Commonwealth Games ===
McHugh has also competed in seven Commonwealth Games in 1998 and 2002, 2006, 2010, 2014, 2018 and 2022. He won a fours gold medal at the 1998 Commonwealth Games.

McHugh was selected for his sixth Games as part of the Northern Ireland team for the 2018 Commonwealth Games on the Gold Coast in Queensland. In 2022 he was selected for his seventh Commonwealth Games, he competed in the men's pairs and the men's fours at the 2022 Commonwealth Games. In the fours the team of Sam Barkley, Adam McKeown, Ian McClure and McHugh won the gold medal defeating India in the final.

For the 2022 Commonwealth Games lawn bowler McHugh and boxer Michaela Walsh were the delegation's flagbearers during the opening ceremony. The Games were Northern Ireland's most successful, with them having won their highest number of gold medals, joint highest number of silver medals, and their most medals overall.

=== National ===
He has been capped 115 times by Ireland.

He is the winner of nineteen senior titles at the Irish National Bowls Championships. He has won six singles and went undefeated for four years winning in 2003, 2004, 2005 and 2006, the other two wins came in 2013 and 2015. In addition to the six singles he has won six pairs (five with Barry Browne 2002, 2005, 2006, 2013, 2014) and (one with Sam Barkley 2021), two triples (2016, 2017, 2026), two fours (1996 & 2005) and two junior titles.

=== Other ===
He also has four British Isles Bowls Championships, three singles (2004, 2005 & 2016) and one pairs (1999) with Barry Browne (2007) and also has a record of 35 NIBA championships. In 2011 he won a silver medal and in 2015 he won two bronze medals at the Atlantic Bowls Championships.He competed in the European championships 2026 were he won gold in the triples with Stuart Bennet and Stephen Kirkwood, he also won gold one the fours with Ryan McIlroy Stephen Kirkwood and Mark Wilson with a n outstanding tournament they won team gold. He also won the Private greens league championship pairs in 2021 with Sam Barkley. He has also won the fours with Alan Hill Maurice Kirkwood and Stephen Kirkwood in 2025. He won the triples with Neil Mulholland and Stephen Kirkwood.
