= Donna McNally =

Northern Irish lawn bowler

Donna McCloy née Donna McNally
Personal information
- Nationality: Northern Irish
- Born: Donna McNally; 2 September 1972 (age 53) Dundonald, Northern Ireland

Sport
- Sport: Lawn bowls
- Club: Ballymena BC; Comber BC
Medal record
Lawn bowls
Representing combined Ireland
World Outdoor Championships
Bronze medal – third place	2008 Christchurch	Fours
Atlantic Bowls Championships
Gold medal – first place	1999 Cape Town	triples
Bronze medal – third place	2005 Bangor	fours
Irish Nationals
Gold medal – first place	2000	pairs
Gold medal – first place	2012	fours
Gold medal – first place	2022	triples

Donna McCloy (née Donna McNally; born 2 September 1972) is a Northern Irish international lawn bowler.

== Bowls career ==
=== International ===
McNally won the triples gold medal at the 1999 Atlantic Bowls Championships with Margaret Johnston and Dorothy Kane. Six years later she won the fours bronze medal at the 2005 Atlantic Championships.

She then won the bronze medal in the fours at the 2008 World Outdoor Bowls Championship in Christchurch.

After taking part in the 2010 Commonwealth Games and the 2014 Commonwealth Games she was selected as part of the Northern Ireland team for the 2018 Commonwealth Games on the Gold Coast in Queensland.

=== National ===
McNally won the 2000 pairs title at the Irish National Bowls Championships, bowling for the Comber Club. Twelve years later she won the 2012 fours title at the National Championships bowling for the Ballymena Bowls Club.

In 2016, McCloy won the finals in both the pairs and fours of the Provincial Towns Women's Bowling Association Championships. In 2022, she won a third national title after winning the triples.

== Personal life ==
She is married to fellow Irish international bowler Gary McCloy and they run the Ballybrakes bowls shop within the Ballybrakes Community Bowls Club.
