= Barbara Cameron (bowls) =

Bowls player from Northern Ireland

Personal information
- Nationality: Northern Irish
- Born: 16 April 1962 (age 64) Coalisland, Northern Ireland

Sport
- Sport: Lawn bowls
- Club: Ballymena BC
Medal record
Representing Northern Ireland
Women's lawn bowls
Commonwealth Games
Bronze medal – third place	2014 Glasgow	Women's pairs
Representing combined Ireland
Atlantic Bowls Championships
Gold medal – first place	1993 Florida	pairs
Bronze medal – third place	1995 Durban	pairs
Irish Nationals
Gold medal – first place	2001	singles
Gold medal – first place	2022	triples

Barbara Mary Cameron BEM (born 16 April 1962) is a Northern Irish international lawn bowler and bowls coach.

== Bowls career ==
=== International ===
In 1993, she won the pairs gold medal with Phillis Nolan at the inaugural Atlantic Bowls Championships. Two years later she won the pairs bronze medal at the Atlantic Championships.

She competed for Northern Ireland in the women's pairs event at the 2014 Commonwealth Games where she won a bronze medal.

=== National ===
In 2001, Cameron won the singles crown at the Irish National Bowls Championships, bowling for Ballymena BC. In 2022, she won the triples title. In 2016, Cameron won the final in the fours of the Provincial Towns Women's Bowling Association Championships.

== Coaching ==
Cameron was selected as a coach for the Northern Ireland team for the 2018 Commonwealth Games on the Gold Coast in Queensland.

Cameron was awarded the British Empire Medal (BEM) in the 2020 Birthday Honours for services to lawn bowls in Northern Ireland.
