= Nan Allely =

Irish lawn and indoor bowler

Personal information
- Nationality: British (Northern Irish)

Sport
- Sport: Lawn and indoor bowls
- Club: Donaghadee BC
Medal record
Representing Ireland
World Outdoor Championships
Gold medal – first place	1981 Toronto	pairs
Bronze medal – third place	1988 Auckland	team
British Isles Championships
Gold medal – first place	1978	pairs

Nan Allely is a former lawn and indoor bowler from Northern Ireland.

== Biography ==
Allely bowled for the Donaghadee Bowls Club outdoors and the Shore Street Presbyterian Club indoors. She was the pairs champion of Ireland with Daisy Fraser in 1977 and 1979 and triples champion in 1980 at the Irish National Bowls Championships and subsequently became the British champion after winning the 1978 pairs at the British Isles Bowls Championships.

Allely won the 1981 World Outdoor Bowls Championship pairs gold in Toronto when partnering Eileen Bell.

Allely represented the Northern Irish team at the 1982 Commonwealth Games in Brisbane, Australia, where she competed in the triples event, with Eileen Bell and Daisy Fraser.

In March 2024, she won a lifetime achievement award at the Ards and North Down Sports Awards ceremony.
