= Margaret Johnston (bowls) =

Northern Irish bowler

Margaret Johnston MBE
Personal information
- Nationality: Irish
- Born: 2 May 1943 (age 83)

Sport
- Club: Ballymoney
Medal record
Representing Ireland
World Outdoor Bowls Championships
| Gold medal – first place | 1988 Auckland | pairs |
| Silver medal – second place | 1988 Auckland | singles |
| Bronze medal – third place | 1988 Auckland | team |
| Gold medal – first place | 1992 Ayr | singles |
| Gold medal – first place | 1992 Ayr | pairs |
| Silver medal – second place | 1992 Ayr | team |
| Gold medal – first place | 1996 Leamington Spa | pairs |
| Gold medal – first place | 2000 Moama | singles |
| Gold medal – first place | 2004 Leamington Spa | singles |
| Bronze medal – third place | 2008 Christchurch | pairs |
Atlantic Bowls Championships
| Silver medal – second place | 1997 | singles |
| Silver medal – second place | 1997 | pairs |
| Gold medal – first place | 1999 | singles |
| Gold medal – first place | 1999 | triples |
British Isles Championships
| Gold medal – first place | 1985 | singles |
| Gold medal – first place | 1996 | singles |
| Gold medal – first place | 1997 | singles |
| Gold medal – first place | 1999 | singles |
| Gold medal – first place | 1985 | pairs |
| Gold medal – first place | 2007 | pairs |
| Gold medal – first place | 1992 | triples |
Representing Northern Ireland
Commonwealth Games
| Gold medal – first place | 1986 | pairs |
| Bronze medal – third place | 1990 | singles |
| Gold medal – first place | 1994 | singles |
World Indoor Bowls Championships
| Gold medal – first place | 1988 | Singles |

Margaret Johnson MBE (born 2 May 1943) is a former Northern Irish lawn and indoor bowler.

== Bowls career ==
Johnston is arguably the greatest women's player of all time despite only starting outdoor bowling in 1979. From Bellaghy, Derry, she joined an indoor club and played locally for many years before joining the Ballymoney Club. In her first year of the outdoors game Johnston reached the final of the Irish Singles.

=== World Outdoor ===
Her record in the World Outdoor Bowls Championship reads as six golds, two silver and one bronze. In 1988 she was pairs champion with Phillis Nolan, silver in the singles and bronze in the team. Four years later she won the singles and pairs (with Nolan again) and a silver in the team. In 1996 she won a third consecutive pairs title with Nolan and four years later in the 2000 World Outdoor Bowls Championship she became singles Champion again. Finally in the 2004 World Outdoor Bowls Championship she won a record third singles title.

=== Commonwealth Games ===
Johnston won the pairs gold medal with Freda Elliott at the 1986 Commonwealth Games and eight years later won a second gold medal after winning the singles competition in Canada. She represented Northern Ireland ins six consecutive Commonwealth Games from 1986 until 2006. In between the two gold medal successes was a bronze medal in the singles at the 1990 Games.

=== Atlantic Championships ===
In 1997 she won the singles and pairs silver medals at the Atlantic Bowls Championships. Two years later she won the singles and triples gold medal at the Championships. Her medal haul would arguably have been greater but she refused to fund her own travel costs which the Irish Bowls authorities failed to fund.

=== National Championships & Other ===
The first Irish National Bowls Championships title came in 1983 and then she went from strength to strength creating an incredible record. She turned back the clock in 2017 when she won the fours title at the Irish National Championships.

Johnston also holds the record number for women's singles titles at the British Isles Bowls Championships, winning four in 1985, 1996, 1997 & 1999.

In addition to her World outdoor and Commonwealth titles she was also the 2004 World Singles Champion of Champions.

=== World Indoor ===
Johnston also won the 1988 World Indoor Bowls Championship title.

== List of major wins ==
Johnson's achievements include:

- 1986 Commonwealth Games Pairs Champion
- 1988 World Indoor Bowls Championship Singles Champion
- 1988 World Outdoor Bowls Championship Pairs Champion
- 1992 World Outdoor Bowls Championship Singles Champion
- 1992 World Outdoor Bowls Championship Pairs Champion
- 1994 Commonwealth Games Singles Champion
- 1996 World Outdoor Bowls Championship Pairs Champion
- 1997 Atlantic Bowls Championships Singles Champion
- 1997 Atlantic Bowls Championships Pairs Champion
- 2000 World Outdoor Bowls Championship Singles Champion
- 2004 World Outdoor Bowls Championship Singles Champion

== Awards and retirement ==
Johnston was appointed Member of the Order of the British Empire (MBE) in the 1991 New Year Honours for services to bowls. She was voted BBC Northern Ireland Sports Personality of the Year in 2004 and in 2008 announced her retirement from international bowls.
