= 2016 World Outdoor Bowls Championship – Women's fours =

World Outdoor Championships 2016 women's fours
- 13th World Outdoor Bowls Championships
- Location: Christchurch, New Zealand
- Date: 29 November – 11 December 2016
- Category: 2016 World Outdoor Bowls Championship

The 2016 World Outdoor Bowls Championship women's fours was held at the Burnside Bowling Club in Avonhead, Christchurch, New Zealand, from 29 November to 4 December 2016.

The women's fours gold medal went to Natasha Scott, Rebecca Van Asch, Carla Krizanic and Kelsey Cottrell of Australia.

== Section tables ==
=== Section 1 ===
| Team | Player | P | W | D | L | Pts | Shots |
|---|---|---|---|---|---|---|---|
| 1 | (New Zealand) Kirsten Edwards, Val Smith, Angela Boyd, Katelyn Inch | 9 | 8 | 0 | 1 | 16 | +90 |
| 2 | (Australia) Natasha Scott, Rebecca Van Asch, Carla Krizanic, Kelsey Cottrell | 9 | 6 | 0 | 3 | 12 | +71 |
| 3 | (Wales) Anwen Butten, Emma Woodcock, Jess Sims, Kathy Pearce | 9 | 6 | 0 | 3 | 12 | +9 |
| 4 | (South Africa) Elma Davis, Susan Nel, Sylvia Burns, Nici Neal | 9 | 5 | 0 | 4 | 10 | +13 |
| 5 | Sandra Bailie, Alicia Weir, Cliodhna Eadie, Sarah‑Jane Curran | 9 | 5 | 0 | 4 | 10 | −39 |
| 6 | (Hong Kong) Mercredi Yeung, Camilla Leung, Gloria Ha, Dorothy Yu | 9 | 4 | 0 | 5 | 8 | −6 |
| 7 | (Singapore) Josephine Lim, Lim Kwee Choon, May Lee, Jane Low | 9 | 4 | 0 | 5 | 8 | −50 |
| 8 | (Namibia) Marietjie van der Bergh, Renetta de Kock, Lesley Vermeulen, Anjuleen Viljoen | 9 | 3 | 0 | 6 | 6 | −36 |
| 9 | (Fiji) Sheral Mar, Elizabeth Moceiwai, Litia Tikoisuva, Loreta Kotoisuva | 9 | 3 | 0 | 6 | 6 | −40 |
| 10 | (Canada) Leanne Chinery, Pricilla Westlake, Shirley Fitzpatrick-Wong, Jackie Foster | 9 | 1 | 0 | 8 | 0 | −12 |

=== Section 2 ===
| Team | Player | P | W | D | L | Pts | Shots |
|---|---|---|---|---|---|---|---|
| 1 | (England) Rebecca Wigfield, Wendy King, Jamie-Lea Winch, Ellen Falkner | 9 | 9 | 0 | 0 | 18 | +96 |
| 2 | (Scotland) Claire Johnston, Julie Forrest, Stacey McDougall, Lauren Baillie | 9 | 7 | 0 | 2 | 14 | +60 |
| 3 | (Philippines) Hazel Jagonoy, Rosita Bradborn, Ronalyn Greenlees, Sonia Bruce | 9 | 6 | 0 | 3 | 12 | +53 |
| 4 | (United States) Anne Nunes, Candy DeFazio, Janice Bell, Michele Arculli | 9 | 5 | 0 | 4 | 10 | −15 |
| 5 | (Malaysia) Nor Hashimah Ismail, Nur Fidrah Noh, Azlina Arshad, Emma Firyana Saroji | 9 | 4 | 1 | 4 | 9 | +73 |
| 6 | (Japan) Hiroko Emura, Masako Satoh, Midori Matsuoka, Noriko Maebayashi | 9 | 4 | 1 | 4 | 9 | +6 |
| 7 | (Spain) Debbie Colquhoun, Lisa Bonsor, Lynne Eldon, Christine Mawson | 9 | 4 | 0 | 5 | 8 | −46 |
| 8 | (Israel) Rivka Ovadia, Shira Eshel, Tami Kamzel, Beverley Polatinsky | 9 | 2 | 1 | 6 | 5 | −26 |
| 9 | (Norfolk Island) Christine Jones, Tess Evans, Anne Pledger, Shae Wilson | 9 | 2 | 1 | 6 | 5 | −48 |
| 10 | (Turkey) Emine Dursun, Filiz Adiguzel, Havva Konanc, Rahsan Akar | 9 | 0 | 0 | 9 | 0 | −153 |

== Finals ==
Play Offs
England | bye
Wales | 14
Philippines | 19
Australia | 17
Scotland | 8
New Zealand | bye

Semifinals
England | 18
Philippines | 15
Australia | 27
New Zealand | 9

Gold medal
England | 8
Australia | 23

== Results ==
Women's fours section 1
| Round 1 – 29 Nov | | |
| South Africa | Canada | 18–14 |
| Namibia | Fiji | 19–14 |
| Wales | Australia | 16–15 |
| Singapore | New Zealand | 17–14 |
| Ireland | Hong Kong | 15–14 |
| Round 2 – 29 Nov | | |
| New Zealand | South Africa | 20–10 |
| Ireland | Canada | 16–14 |
| Wales | Fiji | 20–18 |
| Australia | Namibia | 29–13 |
| Singapore | Hong Kong | 20–15 |
| Round 3 – 29 Nov | | |
| Ireland | Singapore | 19–14 |
| Wales | South Africa | 25–12 |
| Namibia | Canada | 24–20 |
| Fiji | Hong Kong | 16–14 |
| New Zealand | Australia | 21–13 |
| Round 4 – 30 Nov | | |
| New Zealand | Canada | 16–10 |
| Hong Kong | Wales | 19–13 |
| Namibia | Singapore | 24–12 |
| Fiji | Ireland | 22–14 |
| South Africa | Australia | 14–13 |
| Round 5 – 30 Nov | | |
| Canada | Fiji | 25–11 |
| Australia | Hong Kong | 21–11 |
| New Zealand | Namibia | 25–15 |
| Wales | Singapore | 18–11 |
| South Africa | Ireland | 21–14 |
| Round 6 – 30 Nov | | |
| New Zealand | Wales | 22–13 |
| Singapore | Fiji | 17–15 |
| Australia | Ireland | 26–12 |
| South Africa | Namibia | 29–13 |
| Hong Kong | Canada | 14–11 |
| Round 7 – 1 Dec | | |
| New Zealand | Ireland | 29–6 |
| Wales | Namibia | 16–12 |
| Australia | Fiji | 26–13 |
| Singapore | Canada | 19–16 |
| Hong Kong | South Africa | 16–13 |
| Round 8 – 1 Dec | | |
| New Zealand | Hong Kong | 25–15 |
| Australia | Singapore | 30–5 |
| Wales | Canada | 18–17 |
| Ireland | Namibia | 16–15 |
| Fiji | South Africa | 17–14 |
| Round 9 – 1 Dec | | |
| New Zealand | Fiji | 28–11 |
| Australia | Canada | 18–15 |
| South Africa | Singapore | 24–10 |
| Ireland | Wales | 15–11 |
| Hong Kong | Namibia | 24–14 |

Women's fours section 2
| Round 1 – 29 Nov | | |
| Israel | Turkey | 31–7 |
| Scotland | Malaysia | 14–11 |
| England | United States | 29–13 |
| Japan | Spain | 18–12 |
| Philippines | Norfolk Island | 19–9 |
| Round 2 – 29 Nov | | |
| United States | Malaysia | 21–11 |
| England | Scotland | 22–16 |
| Japan | Norfolk Island | 27–11 |
| Spain | Turkey | 21–12 |
| Philippines | Israel | 18–8 |
| Round 3 – 29 Nov | | |
| Japan | Philippines | 15–14 |
| United States | Turkey | 15–10 |
| Scotland | Israel | 22–9 |
| Malaysia | Norfolk Island | 18–8 |
| England | Spain | 22–8 |
| Round 4 – 30 Nov | | |
| England | Turkey | 32–3 |
| Philippines | Malaysia | 22–17 |
| Scotland | Japan | 24–19 |
| United States | Norfolk Island | 21–20 |
| Spain | Israel | 23–14 |
| Round 5 – 30 Nov | | |
| Malaysia | Israel | 32–8 |
| United States | Japan | 26–12 |
| Philippines | Turkey | 23–13 |
| Spain | Scotland | 19–12 |
| England | Norfolk Island | 31–15 |
| Round 6 – 30 Nov | | |
| Spain | United States | 25–11 |
| Japan | Malaysia | 15–15 |
| England | Philippines | 16–15 |
| Scotland | Turkey | 35–9 |
| Israel | Norfolk Island | 14–14 |
| Round 7 – 1 Dec | | |
| England | Malaysia | 17–10 |
| Philippines | Spain | 31–10 |
| Scotland | United States | 22–11 |
| Israel | Japan | 19–9 |
| Norfolk Island | Turkey | 23–12 |
| Round 8 – 1 Dec | | |
| England | Japan | 23–17 |
| Scotland | Philippines | 19–11 |
| United States | Israel | 20–17 |
| Malaysia | Turkey | 33–12 |
| Norfolk Island | Spain | 17–16 |
| Round 9 – 1 Dec | | |
| England | Israel | 14–13 |
| Scotland | Norfolk Island | 20–13 |
| Philippines | United States | 18–11 |
| Malaysia | Spain | 46–3 |
| Japan | Turkey | 29–11 |
