= 2012 World Outdoor Bowls Championship – Women's pairs =

Lawn bowls event

World Outdoor Championships 2012 women's pairs
- 12th World Outdoor Bowls Championships
- Location: Adelaide, Australia
- Date(s): 24 November - 9 December 2012.
- Category: 2012 World Outdoor Bowls Championship

The 2012 World Outdoor Bowls Championship women's pairs was held at the Lockleys Bowling Club in Adelaide, Australia. Some of the qualifying Rounds were held at the nearby Holdfast Bowling Club in Glenelg North.

Rebecca Quail & Kelsey Cottrell won the women's pairs Gold.

== Section tables ==
=== Pool 1 ===
Pos	Player	P	W	D	L	F	A	Pts	Shots
1	(Australia) Rebecca Quail & Kelsey Cottrell	11	10	0	1	263	112	20	+151
2	(New Zealand) Jo Edwards & Val Smith	11	8	0	3	251	136	16	+115
3	(Scotland) Margaret Letham & Claire Johnston	11	8	0	3	227	150	16	+77
4	(South Africa) Colleen Piketh & Esme Steyn	11	7	0	4	221	176	14	+45
5	(Netherlands) Ineke Nagtegaal & Saskia Schaft	11	6	0	5	173	207	12	-34
6	(Israel) Ruthie Gilor & Beverley Polatinsky	11	6	0	5	168	192	12	-24
7	(Hong Kong) Camilla Leung & Joanna Nam	11	5	0	6	168	192	10	-25
8	(Fiji) Elizabeth Moceiwai & Salanieta Gukivuli	11	4	0	7	175	214	10	-39
9	(Norfolk Island) Debbie Wilford & Tess Evans	11	4	0	7	163	193	8	-30
10	(United States) Kimberly Heiser & Eva Lee	11	3	0	8	153	217	6	-64
11	(Canada) Marg Lepere & Jackie Foster	11	2	0	9	160	231	4	-71
12	(Thailand) Kesanee Wongsasapa & Chamaipom Kotchawong	11	2	0	9	140	241	4	-101

=== Pool 2 ===
Pos	Player	P	W	D	L	F	A	Pts	Shots
1	(Philippines) Ainie Knight & Milagros Witheridge	11	10	0	1	249	138	20	+111
2	(England) Ellen Falkner & Wendy King	11	10	0	1	237	129	20	+108
3	(Wales) Anwen Butten & Hannah Smith	11	8	0	3	227	147	16	+80
4	(Spain) Margaret Lawley & Lynn Greenland	11	7	0	4	192	170	14	+13
5	(Jersey) Christine Grimes & Karina Bisson	11	7	0	4	159	160	14	-1
6	(Malaysia) Emma Firyana Saroji & Nur Fidrah Noh	11	6	0	5	184	169	12	+15
7	(Republic of Ireland) Cliodhan Eadie & Paula Montgomery	11	5	0	6	196	154	10	+42
8	(Cyprus) PSol Robertson & Linda Ryan	11	5	0	6	181	167	10	+14
9	(China) May Poon & Yu Xiao Yan	11	3	0	8	130	237	6	-107
10	(Brunei) Kamis Rosita & Umar Sit Ervi Fedarussanti	11	2	0	9	150	223	4	-73
11	(Japan) Masako Satoh & Nanami Yoshimoto	11	2	0	9	140	225	4	-85
12	(Botswana) Pauline Lekone & Tirelo Buckley	11	1	0	10	132	249	4	-117

== Finals ==
Play Offs
Australia
bye
Scotland	22
Wales	14
Philippines
bye
New Zealand	18
England	17

Semifinals
Australia	24
Scotland	1
New Zealand	13
Philippines	12

Gold medal
Australia	16
New Zealand	12

== Results ==
Women's pairs section 1
Round 1 - Nov 24		
Australia	New Zealand	17-11
Scotland	Canada	22-12
South Africa	Hong Kong	25-12
Netherlands	Israel	20-12
Norfolk Island	Thailand	14-13
Fiji	United States	20-12
Round 2 - Nov 24		
New Zealand	Canada	36-7
Thailand	United States	19-17
Fiji	Norfolk Island	18-12
Israel	South Africa	20-15
Hong Kong	Netherlands	17-14
Australia	Scotland	17-16
Round 3 - Nov 25		
Scotland	Fiji	31-12
Netherlands	United States	15-14
South Africa	New Zealand	19-14
Australia	Hong Kong	32-6
Canada	Thailand	18-14
Israel	Norfolk Island	15-9
Round 4 - Nov 25		
Norfolk Island	Canada	26-10
Australia	Netherlands	25-11
New Zealand	Israel	21-9
Hong Kong	United States	16-10
South Africa	Fiji	24-18
Scotland	Thailand	23-11
Round 5 - Nov 25		
Netherlands	Canada	20-19
New Zealand	Norfolk Island	28-15
Scotland	Israel	22-14
United States	South Africa	21-18
Fiji	Hong Kong	17-15
Australia	Thailand	27-9
Round 6 - Nov 26		
Australia	United States	38-6
Israel	Thailand	22-11
Netherlands	Norfolk Island	23-14
Canada	South Africa	25-14
Scotland	Hong Kong	21-11
New Zealand	Fiji	21-13
Round 7 - Nov 26		
Israel	Hong Kong	16-13
Scotland	Norfolk Island	17-8
Fiji	Canada	22-12
New Zealand	United States	26-8
South Africa	Australia	16-12
Netherlands	Thailand	21-17
Round 8 - Nov 27		
South Africa	Thailand	16-13
Hong Kong	New Zealand	22-11
Australia	Canada	19-10
Fiji	Israel	22-18
Scotland	Netherlands	23-12
Norfolk Island	United States	20-11
Round 9 - Nov 27		
Norfolk Island	South Africa	21-19
Australia	Fiji	29-7
Hong Kong	Thailand	24-11
Israel	Canada	21-16
Scotland	United States	25-14
New Zealand	Netherlands	22-10
Round 10 - Nov 28		
South Africa	Scotland	21-16
Australia	Norfolk Island	22-9
Canada	Hong Kong	21-15
New Zealand	Thailand	43-5
United States	Israel	18-10
Netherlands	Fiji	23-10
Round 11 - Nov 28		
South Africa	Netherlands	34-4
Thailand	Fiji	17-16
Australia	Israel	25-11
United States	Canada	22-10
New Zealand	Scotland	18-11
Hong Kong	Norfolk Island	17-15

Women's pairs section 2
Round 1 - Nov 24		
Philippines	Malaysia	25-10
England	Ireland	24-7
Wales	Jersey	24-9
Spain	Cyprus	17-13
China	Japan	19-17
Brunei	Botswana	22-8
Round 2 - Nov 24		
England	Malaysia	21-7
Japan	Botswana	16-15
China	Brunei	13-12
Wales	Cyprus	18-17
Spain	Jersey	17-9
Philippines	Ireland	18-17
Round 3 - Nov 25		
Jersey	Ireland	14-9
Malaysia	Japan	15-12
Cyprus	China	23-13
Philippines	Brunei	25-13
Spain	Botswana	23-15
England	Wales	20-10
Round 4 - Nov 25		
Jersey	Botswana	15-10
Wales	Brunei	25-11
Philippines	Japan	25-7
Malaysia	China	26-13
England	Cyprus	16-11
Ireland	Spain	28-11
Round 5 - Nov 25		
Wales	Botswana	37-10
Jersey	Brunei	21-18
Ireland	Japan	19-14
England	China	20-18
Philippines	Cyprus	17-14
Malaysia	Spain	25-6
Round 6 - Nov 26		
Ireland	Botswana	22-9
Cyprus	Japan	22-8
Spain	China	27-12
Wales	Malaysia	20-12
Philippines	Jersey	20-8
England	Brunei	24-12
Round 7 - Nov 26		
Jersey	Cyprus	19-12
Philippines	China	29-7
Malaysia	Brunei	18-11
England	Botswana	30-18
Wales	Ireland	17-9
Japan	Spain	20-18
Round 8 - Nov 27		
Cyprus	Brunei	21-10
Philippines	Spain	21-13
China	Botswana	15-13
Wales	Japan	32-10
England	Jersey	18-9
Malaysia	Ireland	16-13
Round 9 - Nov 27		
Philippines	Botswana	34-5
Spain	England	13-12
Wales	China	17-9
Ireland	Brunei	24-9
Jersey	Japan	17-10
Cyprus	Malaysia	19-16
Round 10 - Nov 28		
Philippines	Wales	20-15
Ireland	China	32-4
Jersey	Malaysia	17-13
England	Japan	23-9
Botswana	Cyprus	17-9
Spain	Brunei	27-12
Round 11 - Nov 28		
Spain	Wales	20-12
Brunei	Japan	20-17
Cyprus	Ireland	18-16
Malaysia	Botswana	26-12
England	Philippines	29-15
Jersey	China	21-7
