= 2008 World Outdoor Bowls Championship – Women's fours =

Bowls championship held in Christchurch, New Zealand

World Outdoor Bowls Championships 2008 women's fours
- 11th World Outdoor Bowls Championships
- Location: Christchurch, New Zealand
- Date: 12–24 January 2008.
- Category: World Bowls Championship

The 2008 World Outdoor Bowls Championship women's fours was held at the Burnside Bowling Club in Christchurch, New Zealand, from 12 to 24 January 2008.

Lynsey Armitage, Claire Duke, Julie Keegan and Karen Murphy won the women's fours gold medal.

== Section tables ==
=== Section A ===
| Pos | Player | P | W | D | L | F | A | Pts | Shots |
|---|---|---|---|---|---|---|---|---|---|
| 1 | (England) Lynne Whitehead, Jean Baker, Wendy King & Amy Monkhouse | 11 | 10 | 0 | 1 | 253 | 135 | 20 | +118 |
| 2 | (Wales) Hannah Smith, Anwen Butten, Isabel Jones & Wendy Price | 11 | 9 | 1 | 1 | 222 | 158 | 19 | +64 |
| 3 | (New Zealand) Marina Khan, Jan Khan, Sharon Sims & Jo Edwards | 11 | 8 | 1 | 2 | 279 | 108 | 17 | +171 |
| 4 | (Malaysia) Nor Shafeeqah Yahya, Nur Fidrah Noh, Azlina Arshad & Nor Hashimah Ismail | 11 | 7 | 2 | 2 | 274 | 153 | 16 | +121 |
| 5 | (Philippines) Sonia Bruce, Nancy Bercasio, Rosita Bradborn & Ronalyn Greenlees | 11 | 8 | 0 | 3 | 215 | 162 | 16 | +53 |
| 6 | (Brunei) Ahmad Norzainah, Daud Suhana, Muntol Isah & Muntol Azizah | 11 | 7 | 0 | 4 | 198 | 176 | 14 | +22 |
| 7 | (Namibia) Sheena du Toit, Theuna Grobler, Marietjie du Preez & Beatrix Lamprecht | 11 | 5 | 0 | 6 | 177 | 212 | 10 | -35 |
| 8 | (Zambia) Elizabeth Kamuchoma, Hilda Luipa, Margaret Mponda & Eddah Mpezeni | 11 | 4 | 0 | 7 | 172 | 213 | 8 | -41 |
| 9 | (Israel) Beverly Polatinsky, Yaffa Lavin, Yael Barner & Tami Kamzel | 11 | 3 | 0 | 8 | 163 | 229 | 6 | -66 |
| 10 | (Argentina) Maria de Cabrera, Carolina Moris, Maria Ines Canzania & Susana Catarini | 11 | 2 | 0 | 9 | 140 | 263 | 4 | -123 |
| 11 | (Fiji) Caroline Soro, Agnes Stephens, Varisila Vosalotaki & Salanieta Gukivuli | 11 | 1 | 0 | 10 | 160 | 272 | 2 | -112 |
| 12 | (Botswana) Tshenolo Maloisane, Gase Pabalelo, Tirelo Buckley & Ivy Morton | 11 | 0 | 0 | 11 | 122 | 294 | 1 | -172 |

=== Section B ===
| Pos | Player | P | W | D | L | F | A | Pts | Shots |
|---|---|---|---|---|---|---|---|---|---|
| 1 | (Scotland) Joyce Dickey, Seona Black, Margaret Letham & Lynn Stein | 11 | 11 | 0 | 0 | 252 | 150 | 22 | +102 |
| 2 | (Australia) Lynsey Armitage, Claire Duke, Julie Keegan & Karen Murphy | 11 | 9 | 0 | 2 | 259 | 127 | 18 | +132 |
| 3 | (South Africa) Sylvia Burns, Loraine Victor, Cheryl Cox & Lorna Trigwell | 11 | 8 | 0 | 3 | 238 | 158 | 16 | +80 |
| 4 | Alison Bell, Donna McNally, Bernie O'Neill & Jennifer Dowds | 11 | 7 | 0 | 4 | 218 | 159 | 14 | +59 |
| 5 | (Hong Kong) Grace Chu, Winnie Wai, Camilla Leung & Elizabeth Li | 11 | 7 | 0 | 4 | 207 | 177 | 14 | +30 |
| 6 | (Canada) Shirley Ko, Kelly McKerihen, Kerry O'Reilly & Marlene Cleutinx | 11 | 6 | 0 | 5 | 178 | 177 | 12 | +1 |
| 7 | (Jersey) Gaynor Thomas, Christine Grimes, Liz Cole & Suzie Dingle | 11 | 6 | 0 | 5 | 168 | 180 | 12 | -12 |
| 8 | (Norfolk Island) Christine Hore, Wendy Nagy, Anne Pledger & Margaret O'Brien | 11 | 4 | 0 | 7 | 178 | 199 | 8 | -21 |
| 9 | (Spain) Debbie Colquhoun, Carol Meare, Sheri Fletcher & Angie Goodfellow | 11 | 4 | 0 | 7 | 171 | 211 | 8 | -40 |
| 10 | (Cook Islands) Martina Akaruru, Irene Tuouna, Mouauri Tokorangi & Mata Vaile | 11 | 3 | 0 | 8 | 178 | 217 | 6 | -39 |
| 11 | (Eswatini) Celma Nienaber, Charlotte Perry, Geraldine Thomas & Donna Svenningsen | 11 | 1 | 0 | 10 | 141 | 275 | 2 | -134 |
| 12 | (Samoa) Manuia Porter, Lena Adam, Tina Silva & Lufilufi Taulealo | 11 | 0 | 0 | 11 | 116 | 274 | 0 | -158 |

== Finals ==
Play Offs
Australia | 21
Wales | 14
Ireland | 25
England | 16
Wales | 22
South Africa | 10
Malaysia | 18
Scotland | 8

Semifinals
Australia | 20
Ireland | 11
Wales | 18
Malaysia | 15

Gold medal
Australia | 22
Wales | 6

== Results ==
Women's fours section 1
| Round 1 – Jan 12 | | |
| Wales | England | 18–11 |
| New Zealand | Israel | 31–6 |
| Malaysia | Argentina | 48–8 |
| Namibia | Botswana | 24–17 |
| Brunei | Zambia | 20–9 |
| Philippines | Fiji | 26–7 |
| Round 2 – Jan 12 | | |
| England | Fiji | 23–21 |
| Malaysia | Wales | 20–20 |
| New Zealand | Botswana | 39–7 |
| Namibia | Zambia | 20–16 |
| Brunei | Israel | 16–15 |
| Philippines | Argentina | 25–12 |
| Round 3 – Jan 13 | | |
| England | Argentina | 24–8 |
| Wales | Philippines | 22–9 |
| New Zealand | Zambia | 19–10 |
| Malaysia | Fiji | 23–21 |
| Namibia | Israel | 19–16 |
| Brunei | Botswana | 24–10 |
| Round 4 – Jan 13 | | |
| England | New Zealand | 17–14 |
| Wales | Botswana | 29–6 |
| Zambia | Argentina | 18–15 |
| Malaysia | Namibia | 25–11 |
| Israel | Fiji | 22–8 |
| Brunei | Philippines | 29–16 |
| Round 5 – Jan 13 | | |
| England | Israel | 31–7 |
| New Zealand | Wales | 25–11 |
| Malaysia | Botswana | 40–4 |
| Namibia | Argentina | 19–12 |
| Brunei | Fiji | 26–6 |
| Philippines | Zambia | 18–16 |
| Round 6 – Jan 14 | | |
| England | Philippines | 21–17 |
| Wales | Argentina | 25–5 |
| New Zealand | Brunei | 31–4 |
| Zambia | Botswana | 22–11 |
| Malaysia | Israel | 24–9 |
| Namibia | Fiji | 27–14 |
| Round 7 – Jan 14 | | |
| England | Malaysia | 19–14 |
| Wales | Fiji | 27–18 |
| New Zealand | Argentina | 36–6 |
| Zambia | Israel | 20–17 |
| Brunei | Namibia | 23–12 |
| Philippines | Botswana | 24–9 |
| Round 8 – Jan 15 | | |
| England | Brunei | 23–11 |
| Wales | Zambia | 18–17 |
| New Zealand | Malaysia | 16–16 |
| Israel | Argentina | 19–15 |
| Fiji | Botswana | 21–17 |
| Philippines | Namibia | 17–12 |
| Round 9 – Jan 15 | | |
| England | Zambia | 30–8 |
| Wales | Brunei | 14–13 |
| New Zealand | Namibia | 28–7 |
| Israel | Botswana | 23–19 |
| Argentina | Fiji | 26–17 |
| Philippines | Malaysia | 18–14 |
| Round 10 – Jan 16 | | |
| England | Botswana | 30–8 |
| Wales | Namibia | 20–17 |
| New Zealand | Fiji | 32–7 |
| Malaysia | Zambia | 25–13 |
| Brunei | Argentina | 18–15 |
| Philippines | Israel | 28–12 |
| Round 11 – Jan 16 | | |
| England | Namibia | 24–9 |
| Wales | Israel | 18–17 |
| Zambia | Fiji | 23–20 |
| Malaysia | Brunei | 25–14 |
| Argentina | Botswana | 18–14 |
| Philippines | New Zealand | 17–8 |

Women's fours section 2
| Round 1 – Jan 12 | | |
| Jersey | Norfolk Island | 17–14 |
| Scotland | Hong Kong | 23–20 |
| South Africa | Cook Islands | 24–17 |
| Australia | Eswatini | 33–7 |
| Ireland | Samoa | 27–8 |
| Canada | Spain | 20–12 |
| Round 2 – Jan 12 | | |
| Jersey | Cook Islands | 21–15 |
| Scotland | Eswatini | 29–12 |
| South Africa | Spain | 34–8 |
| Australia | Samoa | 30–7 |
| Ireland | Hong Kong | 21–10 |
| Canada | Fiji | 16–15 |
| Round 3 – Jan 13 | | |
| Scotland | Samoa | 21–10 |
| South Africa | Norfolk Island | 14–12 |
| Australia | Hong Kong | 24–11 |
| Ireland | Eswatini | 31–8 |
| Spain | Jersey | 17–16 |
| Cook Islands | Canada | 19–9 |
| Round 4 – Jan 13 | | |
| Jersey | Ireland | 16–12 |
| Scotland | Canada | 21–12 |
| Australia | South Africa | 19–18 |
| Spain | Eswatini | 26–17 |
| Hong Kong | Norfolk Island | 20–16 |
| Cook Islands | Samoa | 35–10 |
| Round 5 – Jan 13 | | |
| Scotland | Norfolk Island | 26–20 |
| South Africa | Samoa | 30–8 |
| Australia | Spain | 25–16 |
| Ireland | Cook Islands | 16–12 |
| Canada | Eswatini | 22–14 |
| Hong Kong | Jersey | 19–11 |
| Round 6 – Jan 14 | | |
| Jersey | Eswatini | 22–11 |
| Scotland | Australia | 16–12 |
| South Africa | Canada | 18–16 |
| Ireland | Spain | 23–10 |
| Hong Kong | Samoa | 29–9 |
| Norfolk Island | Cook Islands | 22–12 |
| Round 7 – Jan 14 | | |
| Scotland | Ireland | 26–14 |
| South Africa | Jersey | 22–9 |
| Australia | Norfolk Island | 38–6 |
| Canada | Samoa | 25–9 |
| Spain | Cook Islands | 27–7 |
| Hong Kong | Eswatini | 26–13 |
| Round 8 – Jan 15 | | |
| Jersey | Australia | 13–7 |
| Scotland | South Africa | 19–16 |
| Canada | Ireland | 16–14 |
| Spain | Samoa | 21–12 |
| Hong Kong | Cook Islands | 26–18 |
| Norfolk Island | Eswatini | 20–9 |
| Round 9 – Jan 15 | | |
| Scotland | Cook Islands | 20–13 |
| South Africa | Hong Kong | 16–14 |
| Australia | Ireland | 19–15 |
| Canada | Jersey | 20–13 |
| Eswatini | Samoa | 20–16 |
| Norfolk Island | Spain | 17–13 |
| Round 10 – Jan 16 | | |
| Jersey | Samoa | 17–15 |
| Scotland | Spain | 23–8 |
| South Africa | Eswatini | 29–13 |
| Australia | Cook Islands | 25–9 |
| Ireland | Norfolk Island | 22–17 |
| Hong Kong | Canada | 15–13 |
| Round 11 – Jan 16 | | |
| Scotland | Jersey | 28–13 |
| Australia | Canada | 27–9 |
| Ireland | South Africa | 23–17 |
| Hong Kong | Spain | 17–13 |
| Cook Islands | Eswatini | 21–17 |
| Norfolk Island | Samoa | 19–12 |
