= Lawn bowls at the 2014 Commonwealth Games – Women's fours =

Lawn bowls – Women's fours at the 2014 Commonwealth Games
- Venue: Kelvingrove Lawn Bowls Centre
- Dates: 24–27 July 2014
- Competitors: 68 from 17 nations

Medalists
gold medal	Esme Steyn; Santjie Steyn; Tracy-Lee Botha; Susan Nel	South Africa
silver medal	Emma Firyana Saroji; Nur Fidrah Noh; Nor Hashimah Ismail; Azlina Arshad	Malaysia
bronze medal	Selina Goddard; Amy McIlroy; Val Smith; Mandy Boyd	New Zealand

The Women's fours at the 2014 Commonwealth Games, was part of the lawn bowls competition, which took place between 24 and 27 July 2014 at the Kelvingrove Lawn Bowls Centre. South Africa won the gold medal, defeating Malaysia in the final. New Zealand won the bronze medal.

== Sectional play ==
=== Section A ===
Rank	Nation	Team	MP	MW	MT	ML	For	Ag	PD	Pts
1	Scotland	Claire Johnston, Lorraine Malloy; Lauren Baillie, Margaret Letham	4	3	0	1	66	46	+20	9
2	Jersey	Christine Grimes, Katie Nixon; Susan Noel, Alison Camacho	4	3	0	1	51	44	+7	9
3	Australia	Carla Odgers, Natasha Scott; Lynsey Clarke, Karen Murphy	4	2	0	2	57	46	+11	6
4	Cook Islands	Kanny Vaile, Matangaro Tupuna; Antonina Browne Linda Vaile	4	2	0	2	50	58	-8	6
5	Papua New Guinea	Haro Raka, Jane Wangon; Angela Simbinali, Monding Tiba	4	0	0	4	45	75	-30	0

24 July, 08:45
Team	1	2	3	4	5	6	7	8	9	10	11	12	13	14	15	Final
Scotland	0	0	0	2	5	6	6	6	7	10	11	11	13	13	16	16
Cook Islands	3	4	5	5	5	5	6	9	9	9	9	10	10	11	11	11
Report

24 July, 08:45
Team	1	2	3	4	5	6	7	8	9	10	11	12	13	14	15	Final
Australia	0	3	3	5	6	7	8	8	9	9	10	11	12	12	12	12
Papua New Guinea	1	1	2	2	2	2	2	5	5	6	6	6	6	8	10	10
Report

24 July, 15:45
Team	1	2	3	4	5	6	7	8	9	10	11	12	13	14	15	Final
Australia	2	4	5	5	5	5	5	6	8	11	11	11	11	12	13	13
Jersey	0	0	0	1	4	6	8	8	8	8	10	12	14	14	14	14
Report

24 July, 15:45
Team	1	2	3	4	5	6	7	8	9	10	11	12	13	14	15	Final
Papua New Guinea	0	4	6	7	8	8	8	12	14	14	14	14	16	16	16	16
Cook Islands	5	5	5	5	5	6	10	10	10	11	16	17	17	18	21	21
Report

25 July, 08:45
Team	1	2	3	4	5	6	7	8	9	10	11	12	13	14	15	Final
Scotland	0	6	8	8	9	11	13	15	16	20	24	24	26	26	27	27
Papua New Guinea	1	1	1	3	3	3	3	3	3	3	3	6	6	7	7	7
Report

25 July, 08:45
Team	1	2	3	4	5	6	7	8	9	10	11	12	13	14	15	Final
Jersey	0	2	3	3	4	4	4	4	4	4	4	5	5	7	7	7
Cook Islands	1	1	1	2	2	3	5	6	7	9	10	10	11	11	12	12
Report

25 July, 15:45
Team	1	2	3	4	5	6	7	8	9	10	11	12	13	14	15	Final
Scotland	0	0	0	1	2	2	3	4	4	5	5	6	6	7	7	7
Jersey	1	2	4	4	4	6	6	6	10	10	13	13	14	14	15	15
Report

25 July, 15:45
Team	1	2	3	4	5	6	7	8	9	10	11	12	13	14	15	Final
Australia	1	1	5	5	6	6	9	10	10	13	16	17	19	19	19	19
Cook Islands	0	1	1	2	2	3	3	3	4	4	4	4	4	5	6	6
Report

26 July, 11:45
Team	1	2	3	4	5	6	7	8	9	10	11	12	13	14	15	Final
Scotland	0	1	3	3	3	3	3	4	8	11	15	16	16	16	16	16
Australia	1	1	1	2	4	5	5	5	5	5	5	5	9	12	13	13
Report

26 July, 11:45
Team	1	2	3	4	5	6	7	8	9	10	11	12	13	14	15	Final
Jersey	2	7	7	8	8	10	11	12	12	13	15	15	15	15	15	15
Papua New Guinea	0	0	1	1	2	2	2	2	3	3	3	7	8	11	12	12
Report

=== Section B ===
Rank	Nation	Team	MP	MW	MT	ML	For	Ag	PD	Pts
1	Malaysia	Emma Firyana Saroji, Nur Fidrah Noh; Nor Hashimah Ismail, Azlina Arshad	4	4	0	0	73	41	32	12
2	Fiji	Salanieta Gukivuli, Doreen O'Connor; Radhika Prasad, Litia Tikoisuva	4	3	0	1	68	46	22	9
3	Northern Ireland	Mandy Cunningham, Jennifer Dowds; Barbara Cameron, Donna McCloy	4	2	0	2	59	54	5	6
4	India	Tania Choudhury, Pinki; Rupa Rani Tirkey, Lovely Choubey	4	1	0	3	50	63	-13	3
5	Niue	Catherine Papani, Josephine Peyroux; Jade Posimani, Rosaalofa Rex	4	0	0	4	41	87	-46	0

24 July, 08:45
Team	1	2	3	4	5	6	7	8	9	10	11	12	13	14	15	Final
Malaysia	1	1	2	2	3	5	5	8	9	14	14	17	17	17	17	17
Niue	0	1	1	2	2	2	3	3	3	3	4	4	5	6	8	8
Report

24 July, 08:45
Team	1	2	3	4	5	6	7	8	9	10	11	12	13	14	15	Final
Fiji	1	3	3	4	6	7	8	8	8	10	12	12	15	17	19	19
India	0	0	1	1	1	1	1	4	7	7	7	8	8	8	8	8
Report

24 July, 15:45
Team	1	2	3	4	5	6	7	8	9	10	11	12	13	14	15	Final
Fiji	1	2	3	5	6	7	8	11	11	12	12	15	16	17	18	18
Northern Ireland	0	0	0	0	0	0	0	0	1	1	4	4	4	4	4	4
Report

24 July, 15:45
Team	1	2	3	4	5	6	7	8	9	10	11	12	13	14	15	Final
India	5	9	9	10	10	10	10	11	11	12	14	16	17	17	20	20
Niue	0	0	1	1	3	4	5	5	7	7	7	7	7	12	12	12
Report

25 July, 08:45
Team	1	2	3	4	5	6	7	8	9	10	11	12	13	14	15	Final
Malaysia	2	2	2	2	4	7	8	10	11	11	14	14	14	15	19	19
India	0	1	4	5	5	5	5	5	5	7	7	8	10	10	10	10
Report

25 July, 08:45
Team	1	2	3	4	5	6	7	8	9	10	11	12	13	14	15	Final
Northern Ireland	1	5	10	12	13	13	15	19	22	22	23	23	23	28	31	31
Niue	0	0	0	0	0	1	1	1	1	3	3	8	9	9	9	9
Report

25 July, 15:45
Team	1	2	3	4	5	6	7	8	9	10	11	12	13	14	15	Final
Malaysia	0	0	0	2	2	3	4	6	7	9	9	12	12	14	15	15
Northern Ireland	1	2	5	5	7	7	7	7	7	7	10	10	11	11	11	11
Report

25 July, 15:45
Team	1	2	3	4	5	6	7	8	9	10	11	12	13	14	15	Final
Fiji	0	3	5	5	5	8	8	9	11	13	15	15	15	15	19	19
Niue	1	1	1	4	5	5	7	7	7	7	7	10	11	12	12	12
Report

26 July, 11:45
Team	1	2	3	4	5	6	7	8	9	10	11	12	13	14	15	Final
Malaysia	2	4	4	8	9	11	11	11	13	16	16	16	17	18	22	22
Fiji	0	0	1	1	1	1	4	5	5	5	10	12	12	12	12	12
Report

26 July, 11:45
Team	1	2	3	4	5	6	7	8	9	10	11	12	13	14	Final
Northern Ireland	0	4	4	4	4	4	4	4	7	7	8	10	10	13	13
India	3	3	5	6	7	8	9	10	10	11	11	11	12	12	12
Report

=== Section C ===
Rank	Nation	Team	MP	MW	MT	ML	For	Ag	PD	Pts
1	New Zealand	Selina Goddard, Amy McIlroy; Val Smith, Mandy Boyd	2	2	0	0	35	19	16	6
2	Zambia	Everlyn Namutowe, Sophia Matipa; Eddah Mpezeni, Foster Banda	2	1	0	1	29	31	-2	3
3	Wales	Anwen Butten, Lisa Forey; Kelly Packwood, Kathy Pearce	2	0	0	2	15	29	-14	0

24 July, 08:45
Team	1	2	3	4	5	6	7	8	9	10	11	12	13	14	15	Final
Wales	0	0	1	1	4	4	4	4	4	6	6	6	6	8	9	9
Zambia	1	2	2	3	3	4	7	8	9	9	11	12	16	16	16	16
Report

25 July, 08:45
Team	1	2	3	4	5	6	7	8	9	10	11	12	13	14	15	Final
New Zealand	5	6	6	11	14	14	14	14	15	15	18	20	20	22	22	22
Zambia	0	0	1	1	1	5	8	10	10	11	11	11	12	12	13	13
Report

26 July, 11:45
Team	1	2	3	4	5	6	7	8	9	10	11	12	13	14	15	Final
Wales	0	0	0	2	2	3	3	3	3	4	4	5	5	6	6	6
New Zealand	1	2	3	3	7	7	8	9	10	10	11	11	12	12	13	13
Report

=== Section D ===
Rank	Nation	Team	MP	MW	MT	ML	For	Ag	PD	Pts
1	England	Ellen Falkner, Sian Honnor; Sophie Tolchard, Jamie-Lea Winch	3	3	0	0	58	32	26	9
2	South Africa	Esme Steyn, Santjie Steyn; Tracy-Lee Botha, Susan Nel	3	1	0	2	46	41	5	3
3	Norfolk Island	Tess Evans, Petal Jones; Wendy Nagy, Essie Sanchez	3	1	0	2	37	49	-12	3
4	Canada	Mary Ann Beath, Leanne Chinery; Jackie Foster, Laura Hawryszko	3	1	0	2	34	53	-19	3

24 July, 08:45
Team	1	2	3	4	5	6	7	8	9	10	11	12	13	14	15	Final
South Africa	0	0	1	2	2	2	2	2	2	2	9	13	13	13	13	13
Norfolk Island	1	3	3	3	4	6	8	9	13	14	14	14	15	16	17	17
Report

24 July, 08:45
Team	1	2	3	4	5	6	7	8	9	10	11	12	13	14	15	Final
England	3	5	10	10	10	12	12	15	15	18	18	18	21	21	21	21
Canada	0	0	0	4	5	5	6	6	7	7	8	9	9	10	11	11
Report

25 July, 08:45
Team	1	2	3	4	5	6	7	8	9	10	11	12	13	14	15	Final
South Africa	2	3	4	8	9	11	11	11	14	14	14	15	17	19	19	19
Canada	0	0	0	0	0	0	1	2	2	5	6	6	6	6	9	9
Report

25 July, 08:45
Team	1	2	3	4	5	6	7	8	9	10	11	12	13	14	15	Final
England	1	3	3	5	9	9	11	16	16	17	18	18	19	19	21	21
Norfolk Island	0	0	1	1	1	3	3	3	5	5	5	6	6	7	7	7
Report

26 July, 11:45
Team	1	2	3	4	5	6	7	8	9	10	11	12	13	14	15	Final
South Africa	1	1	4	7	7	8	9	9	10	10	10	10	13	13	14	14
England	0	3	3	3	4	4	4	6	6	8	12	13	13	15	15	15
Report

26 July, 11:45
Team	1	2	3	4	5	6	7	8	9	10	11	12	13	14	15	Final
Canada	0	0	0	4	4	6	8	8	8	8	10	11	13	14	14	14
Norfolk Island	1	3	4	4	5	5	5	7	10	11	11	11	11	11	13	13
Report

== Knockout stage ==
Quarterfinal
A1	Scotland	16
A2	Jersey	14
D1	England	10
D2	South Africa	12
B1	Malaysia	23
B2	Fiji	8
C1	New Zealand	16
C2	Zambia	5

Semifinal
A1	Scotland	12
D2	South Africa	15
B1	Malaysia	13
C1	New Zealand	11

Finals
D2	South Africa	14
B1	Malaysia	9
Third place
A1	Scotland	15
C1	New Zealand	21

=== Quarterfinals ===
26 July, 16:45
Team	1	2	3	4	5	6	7	8	9	10	11	12	13	14	15	Final
Scotland	0	1	1	1	6	6	9	9	9	10	12	12	15	15	16	16
Jersey	2	2	4	6	6	7	7	9	12	12	12	13	13	14	14	14
Report

26 July, 16:45
Team	1	2	3	4	5	6	7	8	9	10	11	12	13	Final
Malaysia	2	6	6	6	12	13	15	18	18	19	19	21	23	23
Fiji	0	0	2	5	5	5	5	5	6	6	8	8	8	8
Report

26 July, 16:45
Team	1	2	3	4	5	6	7	8	9	10	11	12	13	14	Final
New Zealand	0	2	2	4	5	7	8	9	10	10	12	12	15	16	16
Zambia	1	1	2	2	2	2	2	2	2	3	3	5	5	5	5
Report

26 July, 16:45
Team	1	2	3	4	5	6	7	8	9	10	11	12	13	14	15	Final
England	1	2	2	3	4	6	7	8	8	8	8	9	9	10	10	10
South Africa	0	0	1	1	1	1	1	1	3	7	10	10	11	11	12	12
Report

=== Semifinals ===
27 July, 08:45
Team	1	2	3	4	5	6	7	8	9	10	11	12	13	14	15	Final
Scotland	0	0	1	3	6	6	7	8	9	9	11	11	11	12	12	12
South Africa	5	7	7	7	7	9	9	9	9	10	10	12	13	13	15	15
Report

27 July, 08:45
Team	1	2	3	4	5	6	7	8	9	10	11	12	13	14	15	Final
Malaysia	0	2	2	5	5	5	5	7	7	8	8	10	12	13	13	13
New Zealand	1	1	2	2	3	4	8	8	9	9	10	10	10	10	11	11
Report

=== Finals ===
==== Gold medal ====
27 July, 12:30
Rank	Team	1	2	3	4	5	6	7	8	9	10	11	12	13	14	15	Final
1st place, gold medalist(s)	South Africa	3	3	3	4	4	4	4	4	4	8	9	10	12	13	14	14
2nd place, silver medalist(s)	Malaysia	0	2	3	3	4	5	7	8	9	9	9	9	9	9	9	9
Report

==== Bronze medal ====
27 July, 12:30
Rank	Team	1	2	3	4	5	6	7	8	9	10	11	12	13	14	15	Final
4	Scotland	0	2	3	3	4	6	9	9	9	9	9	12	14	15	15	15
3rd place, bronze medalist(s)	New Zealand	3	3	3	6	6	6	6	9	10	14	16	16	16	16	21	21
Report
