= 2016 World Outdoor Bowls Championship – Women's triples =

World Outdoor Championships 2016 women's triples
- 13th World Outdoor Bowls Championships
- Location: Christchurch, New Zealand
- Date: 29 November – 11 December 2016
- Category: 2016 World Outdoor Bowls Championship

The 2016 World Outdoor Bowls Championship women's triples was held at the Burnside Bowling Club in Avonhead, Christchurch, New Zealand, from 6 to 11 December 2016.

The women's triples gold medal was won by Natasha Scott, Rebecca Van Asch and Carla Krizanic of Australia.

== Section tables ==
=== Section 1 ===
Team	Player	P	W	D	L	Pts	Shots
1	(Malaysia) Nor Hashimah Ismail, Nur Fidrah Noh, Azlina Arshad	9	7	0	2	14	+55
2	(England) Rebecca Wigfield, Wendy King, Jamie-Lea Winch	9	7	0	2	14	+43
3	(South Africa) Elma Davis, Susan Nel, Sylvia Burns	9	7	0	2	14	+42
4	(New Zealand) Kirsten Edwards, Val Smith, Katelyn Inch	9	6	0	3	12	+26
5	(Hong Kong) Mercredi Yeung, Camilla Leung, Gloria Ha	9	6	0	3	12	+25
6	(Philippines) Hazel Jagonoy, Rosita Bradborn, Ronalyn Greenlees	9	5	0	4	10	+28
7	(Namibia) Marietjie van der Bergh, Renetta de Kock, Debbie Voights	9	2	0	7	4	−24
8	(Norfolk Island) Christine Jones, Tess Evans, Anne Pledger	9	2	0	7	4	−37
9	(China) Wang Mei, Zheng Fang, Guo Xiaomin	9	2	0	7	4	−75
10	(Spain) Debbie Colquhoun, Lisa Bonsor, Lynne Eldon	9	1	0	8	2	−83

=== Section 2 ===
Team	Player	P	W	D	L	Pts	Shots
1	(Australia) Natasha Scott, Rebecca Van Asch, Carla Krizanic	9	8	0	1	16	+139
2	(Wales) Anwen Butten, Kathy Pearce, Emma Woodcock	9	7	0	2	14	+34
3	(Scotland) Claire Johnston, Julie Forrest, Stacey McDougall	9	6	0	3	12	+68
4	(Fiji) Sheral Mar, Elizabeth Moceiwai, Litia Tikoisuva	9	5	1	3	11	+56
5	(Canada) Kelly McKerihen, Leanne Chinery, Pricilla Westlake	9	5	1	3	11	+29
6	(United States) Anne Nunes, Candy DeFazio, Janice Bell	9	4	2	3	10	−11
7	(Brunei) Esmawandy Brahim, Nurul Chuchu, Amalia Matali	9	4	0	5	8	−7
8	(Zimbabwe) Mel James, Debbie Robertson, Jane Rigby	9	2	0	7	4	−47
9	Sandra Bailie, Alicia Weir, Cliodhna Eadie	9	2	0	7	4	−56
10	(Isle of Man) Pamela Makin, Winifred Kewley, Anne Watterson	9	0	0	9	0	−205

== Finals ==
Playoffs
Malaysia	bye
England	12
Wales	16
Australia	bye
South Africa	18
Scotland	17

Semifinals
Malaysia	16
Wales	18
Australia	17
South Africa	15

Gold medal
Wales	6
Australia	17

== Results ==
Women's triples section 1
Round 1 – 6 Dec		
Malaysia	Norfolk Island	21–11
England	Spain	23–7
New Zealand	Namibia	21–11
South Africa	Hong Kong	16–13
Philippines	China	17–14
Round 2 – 6 Dec		
Malaysia	Spain	27–6
England	Norfolk Island	23–8
New Zealand	Hong Kong	17–15
Philippines	South Africa	19–11
Namibia	China	16–11
Round 3 – 6 Dec		
Malaysia	Namibia	20–13
England	Philippines	14–11
New Zealand	China	26–10
South Africa	Spain	25–8
Hong Kong	Norfolk Island	22–16
Round 4 – 7 Dec		
England	South Africa	13–9
Malaysia	New Zealand	17–12
Hong Kong	Philippines	16–13
Namibia	Spain	29–10
China	Norfolk Island	22–19
Round 5 – 7 Dec		
England	Namibia	22–12
Philippines	Norfolk Island	26–12
South Africa	New Zealand	16–15
Hong Kong	Malaysia	17–13
Spain	China	24–5
Round 6 – 7 Dec		
England	New Zealand	13–11
Malaysia	China	18–13
Philippines	Spain	24–13
South Africa	Norfolk Island	12–11
Hong Kong	Namibia	17–16
Round 7 – 8 Dec		
Malaysia	England	19–13
South Africa	Namibia	21–20
New Zealand	Philippines	13–11
Norfolk Island	Spain	17–11
China	Hong Kong	17–14
Round 8 – 8 Dec		
England	China	17–8
South Africa	Malaysia	21–14
New Zealand	Norfolk Island	13–12
Hong Kong	Spain	20–11
Philippines	Namibia	25–13
Round 9 – 8 Dec		
Malaysia	Philippines	23–11
South Africa	China	30–6
New Zealand	Spain	16–13
Hong Kong	England	22–12
Norfolk Island	Namibia	20–13

Women's triples section 2
Round 1 – 6 Dec		
Australia	Isle of Man	44–4
Brunei	Ireland	20–14
Wales	Canada	15–11
Scotland	United States	17–13
Zimbabwe	Fiji	18–12
Round 2 – 6 Dec		
Australia	Canada	25–12
Fiji	Brunei	21–12
United States	Isle of Man	28–15
Wales	Scotland	15–12
Ireland	Zimbabwe	22–15
Round 3 – 6 Dec		
Australia	Zimbabwe	27–10
Fiji	Wales	26–5
United States	Ireland	19–17
Brunei	Isle of Man	23–9
Canada	Scotland	15–14
Round 4 – 7 Dec		
Australia	United States	32–9
Canada	Fiji	17–13
Wales	Brunei	14–13
Scotland	Zimbabwe	24–12
Ireland	Isle of Man	21–13
Round 5 – 7 Dec		
Australia	Fiji	20–11
Canada	Isle of Man	30–6
United States	Zimbabwe	25–19
Wales	Ireland	24–9
Scotland	Brunei	20–12
Round 6 – 7 Dec		
Australia	Wales	20–8
Canada	Ireland	21–8
United States	Brunei	18–11
Fiji	Scotland	17–12
Zimbabwe	Isle of Man	25–8
Round 7 – 8 Dec		
Wales	Isle of Man	35–4
Scotland	Australia	22–9
Fiji	Ireland	23–12
United States	Canada	18–18
Brunei	Zimbabwe	22–9
Round 8 – 8 Dec		
Australia	Brunei	30–5
Wales	United States	22–10
Scotland	Ireland	19–8
Fiji	Isle of Man	33–4
Canada	Zimbabwe	26–12
Round 9 – 8 Dec		
Australia	Ireland	21–8
Wales	Zimbabwe	13–12
Scotland	Isle of Man	41–12
United States	Fiji	16–16
Brunei	Canada	23–13
