= 2016 World Outdoor Bowls Championship – Men's fours =

World Outdoor Championships 2016 men's fours
- 13th World Outdoor Bowls Championships
- Location: Christchurch, New Zealand
- Date: 29 November – 11 December 2016
- Category: 2016 World Outdoor Bowls Championship

The 2016 World Outdoor Bowls Championship men's fours was held at the Burnside Bowling Club in Avonhead, Christchurch, New Zealand from 6–11 December 2016.

The men's fours gold medal was won by Blake Signal, Mike Kernaghan, Mike Nagy and Ali Forsyth of New Zealand.

== Section tables ==
=== Section 1 ===
Team	Player	P	W	D	L	Pts	Shots
1	(New Zealand) Blake Signal, Mike Kernaghan, Mike Nagy, Ali Forsyth	9	9	0	0	18	+153
2	(Scotland) Iain McLean, Paul Foster, Ronnie Duncan, Alex Marshall	9	7	0	2	14	+43
3	(United States) James Flower, Aaron Zangl, Scott Roberts, Charlie Herbert	9	6	0	3	12	−15
4	(South Africa) Thinus Oelofse, Petrus Breitenbach, Rudi Jacobs, Jason Evans	9	5	0	4	10	−7
5	(Wales) Steve Harris, Robert Weale, Ross Owen, Marc Wyatt	9	4	1	4	9	+41
6	(Hong Kong) James Po, Jason Choi, Raymond Ho, Terry Kung	9	4	0	5	8	−12
7	(Canada) Ryan Stadnyk, Steve McKerihen, Steven Santana, Cam Lefresne	9	3	1	5	7	−11
8	(Israel) Arie Kremer, Dan Slodownik, Daniel Alonim, Tzvika Hadar	9	3	0	6	6	−43
9	(Fiji) Rajnesh Prasad, Samuela Tuikiligana, Semesa Naiseruvati, Arun Kumar	9	2	0	7	4	−60
10	(Brunei) Haji Naim Brahim, Huziami Mohd Salleh, Md Ali Hj Bujang, PMS Chuchu	9	1	0	8	2	−89

=== Section 2 ===
Team	Player	P	W	D	L	Pts	Shots
1	Martin McHugh, Neil Mulholland, Simon Martin, Ian McClure	9	8	1	0	17	+83
2	(England) Andrew Knapper, Louis Ridout, Robert Paxton, Sam Tolchard	9	7	0	2	14	+97
3	(Australia) Aaron Wilson, Barrie Lester, Mark Casey, Brett Wilkie	9	7	0	2	14	+69
4	(Malaysia) Md Hizlee Abdul Rais, Syamil Syazwan Ramli, Zulhilmie Redzuan, Fairul Izwan Abd Muin	9	5	0	4	10	+43
5	(Zimbabwe) Denis Streak, Clive Robertson, Terry Bowes, Tom Craven	9	5	0	4	10	−17
6	(Jersey) John Lowery, Michael Rive, Scott Ruderham, Greg Davis	9	4	1	4	9	−13
7	(Spain) Derek Eldon, Graham Cathcart, Nick Cole, Tom Rogers	9	3	0	6	6	−30
8	(Norfolk Island) Brent Pauling, Mitchell Graham, Tim Sheridan, John Christian	9	2	1	6	5	−44
9	(Japan) Hisaharu Satoh, Kenichi Emura, Koichi Sakamoto, Munehisa Miyazaki	9	1	1	7	3	−88
10	(Singapore) Pang Hang Heck, Terrence Lee, Thomas Leong, Christian Huang	9	1	0	8	2	−100

== Finals ==
Play Offs
New Zealand	bye
Scotland	20
England	10
Ireland	bye
United States	12
Australia	21

Semifinals
New Zealand	20
Scotland	3
Ireland	10
Australia	22

Gold medal
New Zealand	23
Australia	4

== Results ==
Men's fours section 1
Round 1 – 6 Dec		
New Zealand	Israel	26–10
Scotland	Hong Kong	16–15
South Africa	Fiji	19–14
Wales	Brunei	31–6
United States	Canada	22–13
Round 2 – 6 Dec		
New Zealand	Canada	13–9
Scotland	Brunei	18–9
South Africa	United States	15–14
Hong Kong	Wales	22–17
Israel	Fiji	21–14
Round 3 – 6 Dec		
New Zealand	Fiji	25–5
Scotland	Canada	22–9
South Africa	Brunei	19–12
Wales	United States	23–10
Hong Kong	Israel	22–16
Round 4 – 7 Dec		
New Zealand	Hong Kong	20–8
Scotland	Fiji	20–11
Wales	Israel	24–13
South Africa	Canada	17–8
United States	Brunei	17–10
Round 5 – 7 Dec		
New Zealand	United States	45–4
Scotland	South Africa	17–14
Israel	Brunei	21–9
Canada	Hong Kong	22–15
Fiji	Wales	20–16
Round 6 – 7 Dec		
New Zealand	Brunei	29–8
Wales	South Africa	20–17
Hong Kong	Fiji	18–10
Israel	Canada	16–15
United States	Scotland	15–14
Round 7 – 8 Dec		
New Zealand	South Africa	36–4
Scotland	Wales	16–15
United States	Israel	20–14
Canada	Fiji	22–9
Brunei	Hong Kong	20–13
Round 8 – 8 Dec		
New Zealand	Scotland	23–17
United States	Hong Kong	17–12
South Africa	Israel	25–15
Wales	Canada	15–15
Fiji	Brunei	20–10
Round 9 – 8 Dec		
New Zealand	Wales	14–13
Scotland	Israel	24–10
United States	Fiji	27–15
Hong Kong	South Africa	17–16
Canada	Brunei	22–17

Men's fours section 2
Round 1 – 6 Dec		
England	Spain	24–4
Australia	Zimbabwe	21–17
Ireland	Singapore	26–6
Malaysia	Jersey	20–12
Japan	Norfolk Island	18–15
Round 2 – 6 Dec		
England	Malaysia	19–16
Australia	Norfolk Island	27–11
Ireland	Jersey	17–17
Spain	Singapore	14–11
Zimbabwe	Japan	18–10
Round 3 – 6 Dec		
England	Norfolk Island	28–6
Australia	Singapore	17–11
Ireland	Malaysia	17–10
Spain	Zimbabwe	25–17
Jersey	Japan	23–11
Round 4 – 7 Dec		
England	Singapore	35–3
Australia	Spain	16–14
Ireland	Norfolk Island	23–14
Malaysia	Japan	24–11
Jersey	Zimbabwe	20–13
Round 5 – 7 Dec		
England	Japan	35–7
Australia	Jersey	32–9
Ireland	Zimbabwe	27–11
Malaysia	Spain	28–10
Norfolk Island	Singapore	12–12
Round 6 – 7 Dec		
England	Jersey	21–22
Australia	Malaysia	19–13
Ireland	Japan	17–12
Zimbabwe	Singapore	17–15
Norfolk Island	Spain	24–16
Round 7 – 8 Dec		
Ireland	England	28–10
Australia	Japan	27–6
Malaysia	Singapore	30–11
Zimbabwe	Norfolk Island	18–13
Jersey	Spain	19–12
Round 8 – 8 Dec		
Ireland	Australia	21–14
Malaysia	Norfolk Island	21–19
Zimbabwe	England	16–14
Jersey	Singapore	19–12
Spain	Japan	24–9
Round 9 – 8 Dec		
Ireland	Spain	14–13
England	Australia	16–14
Zimbabwe	Malaysia	19–18
Norfolk Island	Jersey	19–14
Zimbabwe	Japan	18–17
