= Lawn bowls at the 2014 Commonwealth Games – Women's triples =

Lawn bowls – Women's triples at the 2014 Commonwealth Games
- Venue: Kelvingrove Lawn Bowls Centre
- Dates: 28–31 July 2014
- Competitors: 54 from 17 nations

Medalists
gold medal	Ellen Falkner; Sian Gordon; Sophie Tolchard	England
silver medal	Karen Murphy; Kelsey Cottrell; Lynsey Clarke	Australia
bronze medal	Esme Steyn; Susan Nel; Santjie Steyn	South Africa

The Women's triple at the 2014 Commonwealth Games, was part of the lawn bowls competition, which took place between 28 and 31 July 2014 at the Kelvingrove Lawn Bowls Centre. England won the gold medal, defeating Australia in the final. South Africa won the bronze medal.

== Sectional play ==
=== Section A ===
Rank	Team	Team	MP	MW	MT	ML	For	Ag	PD	Pts
1	Australia	Karen Murphy, Kelsey Cottrell, Lynsey Clarke	4	3	1	0	73	48	+25	10
2	Malaysia	Emma Firyana Saroji, Nur Fidrah Noh, Azlina Arshad	4	3	0	1	80	49	+31	9
3	India	Rupa Rani Tirkey, Nayanmoni Saikia, Lovely Choubey	4	2	1	1	75	44	+31	7
4	Jersey	Christine Grimes, Susan Noel, Alison Camacho	4	1	0	3	52	77	-25	3
5	Niue	Catherine Papani, Jade Posimani, Rosaalofa Rex	4	0	0	4	34	96	-62	0

28 July, 12:45
Team	1	2	3	4	5	6	7	8	9	10	11	12	13	14	15	16	17	18	Final
Australia	1	5	5	5	8	8	8	11	16	19	19	19	19	20	24	24	24	24	24
Niue	0	0	1	2	2	3	4	4	4	4	5	6	7	7	7	8	9	10	10
Report

28 July, 12:45
Team	1	2	3	4	5	6	7	8	9	10	11	12	13	14	15	16	17	18	Final
Malaysia	0	0	2	4	4	5	5	6	6	7	8	10	10	10	11	11	14	16	16
India	3	7	7	7	8	8	9	9	11	11	11	11	12	13	13	14	14	14	14
Report

28 July, 17:45
Team	1	2	3	4	5	6	7	8	9	10	11	12	13	14	15	16	17	18	Final
Malaysia	0	2	2	2	4	4	6	6	9	12	13	16	20	24	26	26	27	28	28
Jersey	1	1	2	3	3	5	5	6	6	6	6	6	6	6	6	7	7	7	7
Report

28 July, 17:45
Team	1	2	3	4	5	6	7	8	9	10	11	12	13	14	15	16	17	18	Final
India	3	5	6	8	9	12	15	18	19	20	21	24	24	25	26	27	29	30	30
Niue	0	0	0	0	0	0	0	0	0	0	0	0	1	1	1	1	1	1	1
Report

29 July, 11:45
Team	1	2	3	4	5	6	7	8	9	10	11	12	13	14	15	16	17	18	Final
Australia	0	0	2	5	5	5	5	7	7	9	9	10	11	12	12	13	13	13	13
India	1	3	3	3	5	6	7	7	8	8	9	9	9	9	10	10	11	13	13
Report

29 July, 11:45
Team	1	2	3	4	5	6	7	8	9	10	11	12	13	14	15	16	17	18	Final
Jersey	0	1	1	3	4	6	7	7	7	9	10	10	10	10	11	13	13	16	16
Niue	3	3	4	4	4	4	4	5	6	6	6	9	10	14	14	14	15	15	15
Report

29 July, 18:45
Team	1	2	3	4	5	6	7	8	9	10	11	12	13	14	15	16	17	18	Final
Australia	1	1	1	2	2	3	3	7	9	9	9	12	12	12	12	12	15	16	16
Jersey	0	2	3	3	4	4	6	6	6	7	9	9	10	11	14	15	15	15	15
Report

29 July, 18:45
Team	1	2	3	4	5	6	7	8	9	10	11	12	13	14	15	16	17	18	Final
Malaysia	0	1	1	3	5	7	8	8	13	17	19	19	19	21	22	25	25	26	26
Niue	2	2	3	3	3	3	3	4	4	4	4	6	7	7	7	7	8	8	8
Report

30 July, 11:45
Team	1	2	3	4	5	6	7	8	9	10	11	12	13	14	15	16	17	18	Final
Australia	1	3	6	6	8	10	10	11	13	14	16	18	18	19	20	20	20	20	20
Malaysia	0	0	0	2	2	2	3	3	3	3	3	3	5	5	5	6	8	10	10
Report

30 July, 11:45
Team	1	2	3	4	5	6	7	8	9	10	11	12	13	14	15	16	17	18	Final
Jersey	1	1	1	2	2	6	6	6	7	7	7	8	9	9	10	11	13	14	14
India	0	2	4	4	7	7	10	12	12	13	15	15	15	18	18	18	18	18	18
Report

=== Section B ===
Rank	Nation	Team	MP	MW	MT	ML	For	Ag	PD	Pts
1	New Zealand	Mandy Boyd, Selina Goddard, Amy McIlroy	4	4	0	0	87	40	+47	12
2	Fiji	Doreen O'Connor, Radhika Prasad, Litia Tikoisuva	4	2	0	2	57	65	-8	6
3	Canada	Mary Ann Beath, Laura Hawryszko, Kelly McKerihen	4	1	1	2	64	69	-5	4
4	Zambia	Everlyn Namutowe, Sophia Matipa, Eddah Mpezeni	4	1	1	2	50	73	-23	4
5	Cook Islands	Antonina Browne, Matangaro Tupuna, Kanny Vaile	4	1	0	3	54	65	-11	3

28 July, 12:45
Team	1	2	3	4	5	6	7	8	9	10	11	12	13	14	15	16	17	18	Final
New Zealand	1	4	6	8	8	9	11	13	13	13	14	15	18	18	18	19	20	21	21
Cook Islands	0	0	0	0	1	1	1	1	2	5	5	5	5	6	7	7	7	7	7
Report

28 July, 12:45
Team	1	2	3	4	5	6	7	8	9	10	11	12	13	14	15	16	17	18	Final
Canada	2	2	3	4	5	8	9	9	9	9	9	9	12	13	14	14	14	16	16
Zambia	0	3	3	3	3	3	3	4	5	6	7	10	10	10	10	14	16	16	16
Report

28 July, 17:45
Team	1	2	3	4	5	6	7	8	9	10	11	12	13	14	15	16	17	18	Final
Canada	0	4	6	6	6	6	7	7	9	9	11	11	13	14	14	14	14	16	16
Fiji	2	2	2	3	4	5	5	6	6	9	9	13	13	13	15	16	16	17	17
Report

28 July, 17:45
Team	1	2	3	4	5	6	7	8	9	10	11	12	13	14	15	16	17	18	Final
Zambia	0	0	0	4	4	4	4	6	6	6	7	7	7	7	7	7	8	8	8
Cook Islands	1	2	3	3	4	5	8	8	12	13	13	14	18	19	20	21	21	22	22
Report

29 July, 11:45
Team	1	2	3	4	5	6	7	8	9	10	11	12	13	14	15	16	17	18	Final
New Zealand	0	1	2	2	5	6	6	9	12	13	13	15	19	19	20	21	21	22	22
Zambia	3	3	3	4	4	4	7	7	7	7	8	8	8	9	9	9	10	10	10
Report

29 July, 11:45
Team	1	2	3	4	5	6	7	8	9	10	11	12	13	14	15	16	17	18	Final
Fiji	3	4	4	5	6	7	7	7	9	10	10	12	12	12	12	16	16	16	16
Cook Islands	0	0	1	1	1	1	2	3	3	3	5	5	6	8	10	10	11	12	12
Report

29 July, 18:45
Team	1	2	3	4	5	6	7	8	9	10	11	12	13	14	15	16	17	18	Final
New Zealand	1	2	5	5	6	7	7	7	7	9	12	13	14	14	16	16	20	21	21
Fiji	0	0	0	2	2	2	4	5	8	8	8	8	8	10	10	11	11	11	11
Report

29 July, 18:45
Team	1	2	3	4	5	6	7	8	9	10	11	12	13	14	15	16	17	18	Final
Canada	2	5	7	8	8	8	9	10	12	12	12	12	12	13	15	17	17	20	20
Cook Islands	0	0	0	0	3	5	5	5	5	7	8	11	12	12	12	12	13	13	13
Report

30 July, 11:45
Team	1	2	3	4	5	6	7	8	9	10	11	12	13	14	15	16	17	18	Final
New Zealand	0	1	1	2	2	3	6	7	11	16	16	16	17	18	20	21	23	23	23
Canada	1	1	3	3	6	6	6	6	6	6	9	11	11	11	11	11	11	12	12
Report

30 July, 11:45
Team	1	2	3	4	5	6	7	8	9	10	11	12	13	14	15	16	17	18	Final
Fiji	1	1	2	2	3	3	4	4	6	6	7	9	9	9	11	11	13	13	13
Zambia	0	2	2	4	4	5	5	7	7	8	8	8	10	11	11	13	13	16	16
Report

=== Section C ===
Rank	Nation	Team	MP	MW	MT	ML	For	Ag	PD	Pts
1	England	Ellen Falkner, Sian Gordon, Sophie Tolchard	3	2	0	1	53	41	+12	6
2	Scotland	Lauren Baillie, Claire Johnston, Margaret Letham	3	2	0	1	50	40	+10	6
3	Northern Ireland	Mandy Cunningham, Jennifer Dowds, Barbara Cameron, Donna McCloy	3	1	0	2	49	52	-3	3
4	Papua New Guinea	Haro Raka, Angela Simbinali, Monding Tiba	3	1	0	2	43	62	-19	3

28 July, 12:45
Team	1	2	3	4	5	6	7	8	9	10	11	12	13	14	15	16	17	18	Final
Scotland	0	1	3	5	5	5	7	8	12	12	14	16	19	19	19	20	22	22	22
Papua New Guinea	2	2	2	2	3	4	4	4	4	5	5	5	5	6	7	7	7	8	8
Report

28 July, 12:45
Team	1	2	3	4	5	6	7	8	9	10	11	12	13	14	15	16	17	18	Final
England	0	2	3	3	3	3	7	7	7	8	11	11	13	14	14	14	17	18	18
Northern Ireland	1	1	1	2	5	6	6	6	7	8	8	8	9	9	9	11	12	12	12
Report

29 July, 11:45
Team	1	2	3	4	5	6	7	8	9	10	11	12	13	14	15	16	17	18	Final
Scotland	2	3	3	3	5	5	6	10	11	11	14	15	15	18	19	19	19	19	19
Northern Ireland	0	0	1	2	2	3	3	3	3	4	4	4	5	5	5	8	9	11	11
Report

29 July, 11:45
Team	1	2	3	4	5	6	7	8	9	10	11	12	13	14	15	16	17	18	Final
England	1	1	1	1	3	3	3	3	6	6	6	7	8	8	8	11	14	14	14
Papua New Guinea	0	2	5	9	9	10	11	12	12	13	15	15	15	16	18	18	18	20	20
Report

30 July, 11:45
Team	1	2	3	4	5	6	7	8	9	10	11	12	13	14	15	16	17	18	Final
Scotland	1	2	2	4	4	4	4	4	5	5	7	7	7	7	8	8	8	9	9
England	0	0	2	2	3	4	8	9	9	10	10	12	14	17	17	19	20	21	21
Report

30 July, 11:45
Team	1	2	3	4	5	6	7	8	9	10	11	12	13	14	15	16	17	18	Final
Northern Ireland	0	0	2	7	11	15	15	15	15	16	18	23	23	25	25	26	26	26	26
Papua New Guinea	1	3	3	3	3	3	7	9	11	11	11	11	12	12	13	13	14	15	15
Report

=== Section D ===
Rank	Team	Team	MP	MW	MT	ML	For	Ag	PD	Pts
1	South Africa	Esme Steyn, Susan Nel, Santjie Steyn	2	2	0	0	29	25	+4	6
2	Wales	Lisa Forey, Kelly Packwood, Kathy Pearce	2	1	0	1	27	26	+1	3
3	Norfolk Island	Tess Evans, Petal Jones, Wendy Nagy	2	0	0	2	24	29	-5	0

28 July, 12:45
Team	1	2	3	4	5	6	7	8	9	10	11	12	13	14	15	16	17	18	Final
South Africa	1	2	2	3	5	8	9	9	11	11	13	13	14	14	14	14	14	15	15
Norfolk Island	0	0	2	2	2	2	2	3	3	4	4	7	7	8	9	11	12	12	12
Report

29 July, 11:45
Team	1	2	3	4	5	6	7	8	9	10	11	12	13	14	15	16	17	18	Final
Wales	2	3	4	4	5	5	6	6	6	6	7	7	7	12	13	14	14	14	14
Norfolk Island	0	0	2	2	2	3	3	5	6	8	8	9	10	10	10	10	11	12	12
Report

30 July, 11:45
Team	1	2	3	4	5	6	7	8	9	10	11	12	13	14	15	16	17	18	Final
Wales	0	1	4	4	4	5	5	6	6	7	9	9	9	12	12	13	13	13	13
South Africa	2	2	2	3	4	4	6	6	7	7	7	7	9	9	11	11	13	14	14
Report

== Knockout stage ==
Quarterfinals
A1	Australia	25
B2	Fiji	8
D1	South Africa	21
C2	Scotland	12
B1	New Zealand	13
D2	Wales	14
C1	England	24
A2	Malaysia	8

Semifinals
A1	Australia	17
D1	South Africa	8
D2	Wales	13
C1	England	18

Finals
A1	Australia	4
C1	England	22
Third place
D1	South Africa	23
D2	Wales	14

=== Quarterfinals ===
30 July, 15:45
Team	1	2	3	4	5	6	7	8	9	10	11	12	13	14	15	16	Final
Australia	1	3	9	11	11	11	13	15	19	19	19	20	23	24	24	25	25
Fiji	0	0	0	0	1	4	4	4	4	5	7	7	7	7	8	8	8
Report

30 July, 15:45
Team	1	2	3	4	5	6	7	8	9	10	11	12	13	14	15	16	17	18	19	Final
New Zealand	1	2	2	2	4	4	4	6	7	7	8	11	12	12	12	12	12	13	13	13
Wales	0	0	1	2	2	3	4	4	4	5	5	5	5	6	9	12	13	13	14	14
Report

30 July, 15:45
Team	1	2	3	4	5	6	7	8	9	10	11	12	13	14	15	16	Final
England	2	6	9	10	14	14	15	16	16	16	17	17	19	22	22	24	24
Malaysia	0	0	0	0	0	1	1	1	2	3	3	4	4	4	6	6	6
Report

30 July, 15:45
Team	1	2	3	4	5	6	7	8	9	10	11	12	13	14	15	16	17	Final
South Africa	1	1	3	3	7	7	7	9	10	12	14	16	17	19	20	21	21	21
Scotland	0	1	1	5	5	7	9	9	9	9	9	9	9	9	9	9	12	12
Report

=== Semifinals ===
31 July, 12:45
Team	1	2	3	4	5	6	7	8	9	10	11	12	13	14	15	16	17	Final
Australia	0	2	2	2	2	3	4	8	8	11	12	13	14	14	15	16	17	17
South Africa	2	2	3	4	6	6	6	6	7	7	7	7	7	8	8	8	8	8
Report

31 July, 12:45
Team	1	2	3	4	5	6	7	8	9	10	11	12	13	14	15	16	17	18	Final
Wales	0	0	3	3	3	5	5	6	8	9	11	11	11	12	12	12	12	13	13
England	2	5	5	6	8	8	11	11	11	11	11	14	15	15	16	17	18	18	18
Report

=== Finals ===
==== Gold medal match ====
31 July, 17:30
Rank	Team	1	2	3	4	5	6	7	8	9	10	11	12	13	14	15	Final
2nd place, silver medalist(s)	Australia	0	0	0	1	1	1	1	1	1	1	2	3	3	3	4	4
1st place, gold medalist(s)	England	5	6	11	11	12	13	16	17	18	20	20	20	21	22	22	22
Report

==== Bronze medal match ====
31 July, 17:30
Rank	Team	1	2	3	4	5	6	7	8	9	10	11	12	13	14	15	16	17	Final
3rd place, bronze medalist(s)	South Africa	5	5	7	7	7	8	9	9	9	10	10	10	11	12	17	20	23	23
4	Wales	0	3	3	4	5	5	5	6	7	7	10	14	14	14	14	14	14	14
Report
