= 2016 World Outdoor Bowls Championship – Men's triples =

Bowls event

World Outdoor Championships 2016 men's triples
- 13th World Outdoor Bowls Championships
- Location: Christchurch, New Zealand
- Date(s): 29 November – 11 December 2016
- Category: 2016 World Outdoor Bowls Championship

The 2016 World Outdoor Bowls Championship men's triples was held at the Burnside Bowling Club in Avonhead, Christchurch, New Zealand, from 29 November to 4 December 2016.

The men's triples gold medal went to Andrew Knapper, Jamie Walker and Robert Paxton of England.

== Section tables ==
=== Section 1 ===
Team	Player	P	W	D	L	Pts	Shots
1	(New Zealand) Blake Signal, Mike Nagy, Ali Forsyth	9	8	0	1	16	+54
2	(Australia) Aron Sherriff, Barrie Lester, Mark Casey	9	7	1	1	15	+85
3	Martin McHugh, Neil Mulholland, Simon Martin	9	6	0	3	12	+32
4	(Namibia) Douw Calitz, Graham Snyman, Willem Esterhuizen	9	4	1	4	9	+9
5	(Jersey) John Lowery, Michael Rive, Greg Davis	9	4	0	5	8	−8
6	(United States) James Flower, Phil Dunn, Scott Roberts	9	4	0	5	8	−48
7	(Wales) Steve Harris, Robert Weale, Ross Owen	9	3	1	5	7	+18
8	(Canada) Ryan Stadnyk, Steve McKerihen, Cam Lefresne	9	3	0	6	6	−47
9	(Malaysia) Fairus Jabal, Syamil Syazwan Ramli, Zulhilmie Redzuan	9	2	1	6	4	−42
10	(Samoa) Ieremia Salesa, Ioane Petelo, Arthur Bell	9	2	0	7	4	−53

=== Section 2 ===
Team	Player	P	W	D	L	Pts	Shots
1	(England) Andrew Knapper, Jamie Walker, Robert Paxton	9	8	0	1	16	+65
2	(Scotland) Darren Burnett, Iain McLean, Ronnie Duncan	9	7	0	2	14	+95
3	(Japan) Kenta Hasebe, Hisaharu Satoh, Kenichi Emura	9	6	0	3	12	+26
4	(Spain) Peter Bonsor, Graham Cathcart, Nick Cole	9	5	0	4	10	+35
5	(Brunei) Abdul Rahman bin Haji Omar, Haji Naim Brahim, Md Ali Hj Bujang	9	5	0	4	10	−15
6	(Zimbabwe) Tom Craven, Denis Streak, Terry Bowes	9	4	0	5	8	−39
7	(South Africa) Thinus Oelofse, Petrus Breitenbach, Rudi Jacobs	9	3	1	5	7	−24
8	(Fiji) Rajnesh Prasad, Semesa Naiseruvati, Arun Kumar	9	3	0	6	6	−23
9	(Norfolk Island) Brent Pauling, Mitchell Graham, Tim Sheridan	9	3	0	6	6	−24
10	(Niue) Koloni Polima, Dalton Tagelagi, John Kumitau	9	0	1	8	1	−96

== Finals ==
Play Offs
England	bye
Japan	16
Ireland	15
New Zealand	bye
Australia	16
Scotland	13

Semifinals
England	18
Japan	9
New Zealand	10
Australia	18

Gold medal
England	15
Australia	14

== Results ==
men's triples Section 1
Round 1 – 29 Nov		
Canada	United States	22–14
New Zealand	Jersey	16–13
Australia	Wales	20–20
Ireland	Samoa	19–8
Malaysia	Namibia	14–14
Round 2 – 29 Nov		
United States	Samoa	16–9
Namibia	Canada	19–11
Jersey	Wales	15–12
Australia	New Zealand	19–9
Malaysia	Ireland	14–12
Round 3 – 29 Nov		
Ireland	Namibia	20–13
Wales	United States	26–7
New Zealand	Canada	23–8
Jersey	Malaysia	27–5
Australia	Samoa	15–14
Round 4 – 30 Nov		
Australia	United States	29–10
Jersey	Namibia	24–23
New Zealand	Ireland	17–9
Wales	Malaysia	16–15
Canada	Samoa	15–11
Round 5 – 30 Nov		
Jersey	Canada	20–10
Australia	Malaysia	21–10
New Zealand	Samoa	27–8
Ireland	Wales	17–13
United States	Namibia	17–15
Round 6 – 30 Nov		
Wales	Samoa	21–5
Ireland	Jersey	23–12
Namibia	Australia	12–9
New Zealand	United States	23–16
Malaysia	Canada	16–10
Round 7 – 1 Dec		
New Zealand	Wales	17–13
Australia	Jersey	28–4
Ireland	Canada	20–11
Namibia	Samoa	19–12
United States	Malaysia	17–14
Round 8 – 1 Dec		
New Zealand	Namibia	18–16
Australia	Ireland	19–11
United States	Jersey	13–12
Canada	Wales	17–13
Samoa	Malaysia	23–16
Round 9 – 1 Dec		
New Zealand	Malaysia	19–13
Australia	Canada	21–6
Ireland	United States	19–11
Namibia	Wales	19–16
Samoa	Jersey	18–13

men's triples Section 2
Round 1 – 29 Nov		
England	Spain	14–11
Scotland	Japan	23–19
Brunei	Zimbabwe	22–11
South Africa	Fiji	25–10
Norfolk Island	Niue	17–12
Round 2 – 29 Nov		
South Africa	Spain	15–12
England	Norfolk Island	23–13
Japan	Zimbabwe	18–10
Scotland	Brunei	21–9
Fiji	Niue	20–12
Round 3 – 29 Nov		
Fiji	Norfolk Island	15–14
Zimbabwe	Spain	20–13
England	Scotland	18–13
Japan	Niue	22–12
Brunei	South Africa	18–14
Round 4 – 30 Nov		
England	South Africa	21–10
Japan	Norfolk Island	17–16
Scotland	Fiji	19–16
Spain	Brunei	19–11
Zimbabwe	Niue	16–11
Round 5 – 30 Nov		
England	Japan	19–10
Brunei	Niue	23–14
Scotland	South Africa	28–8
Zimbabwe	Fiji	16–11
Spain	Norfolk Island	10–8
Round 6 – 30 Nov		
Zimbabwe	South Africa	16–14
Norfolk Island	Brunei	21–12
England	Niue	31–8
Spain	Scotland	22–13
Japan	Fiji	16–11
Round 7 – 1 Dec		
England	Fiji	16–13
Scotland	Zimbabwe	32–8
Japan	Brunei	28–11
Spain	Niue	20–10
South Africa	Norfolk Island	15–12
Round 8 – 1 Dec		
England	Zimbabwe	21–15
Scotland	Norfolk Island	27–7
Spain	Japan	19–9
Brunei	Fiji	17–15
South Africa	Niue	15–15
Round 9 – 1 Dec		
Scotland	Niue	34–8
Japan	South Africa	23–15
Brunei	England	18–13
Fiji	Spain	18–17
Norfolk Island	Zimbabwe	22–13
