= Curtis Mar =

Personal information
- Nationality: Fiji
- Born: 6 August 1967 (age 58)
Medal record
Representing Fiji
World Outdoor Championships
| Silver medal – second place | 2008 Christchurch | Men's triples |

Curtis Mar (born 6 August 1967) is a Fijian international lawn bowler and team manager.

In 2008 he won the silver medal in the triples at the 2008 World Outdoor Bowls Championship in Christchurch along with Keshwa Goundar and Samuela Tuikiligana.

In 2016 he was the team manager during the 2016 World Outdoor Bowls Championship.
