= Michael Nagy (bowls) =

New Zealand international lawn and indoor bowler

Personal information
- Nationality: New Zealander
- Born: 29 November 1980 (age 45)

Sport
- Sport: Bowls
- Club: Birkenhead, North Harbour and Taren Point, Sydney
Medal record
Representing New Zealand
World Outdoor Championships
Bronze medal – third place	2016 Christchurch	triples
Gold medal – first place	2016 Christchurch	fours
Gold medal – first place	2016 Christchurch	team
Asia Pacific Bowls Championships
Gold medal – first place	2015 Christchurch	triples
Gold medal – first place	2015 Christchurch	fours

Michael Nagy (born 29 November 1980) is a New Zealand international lawn and indoor bowler.

== Bowls career ==
Nagy has won two Asia Pacific Bowls Championships gold medals and won a bronze medal at the 2016 World Outdoor Bowls Championship in Christchurch in the triples with Ali Forsyth and Blake Signal before winning a gold medal in the fours with Forsyth, Signal and Mike Kernaghan.

He was selected as part of the New Zealand team for the 2018 Commonwealth Games on the Gold Coast in Queensland.

He won the 2013/14 pairs title and 2013/14 fours title at the New Zealand National Bowls Championships when bowling for the Taren Point Bowls Club.
