= Ali Forsyth =

New Zealand international lawn and indoor bowler

Personal information
- Born: Alexander David Forsyth; 11 December 1979 (age 46) Nelson, New Zealand

Sport
- Country: New Zealand
- Sport: Lawn bowls
- Club: Stoke Bowling Club; United Bowling Club; Taren Point Bowling Club; Havelock Bowling Club; Nelson Bowling Club; Clayton Bowls Club

Achievements and titles
- National finals: New Zealand; Singles champion (2003, 2004, 2014); Pairs champion (2013, 2016, 2018); Fours champion (2011, 2012, 2018); Australia; Open triples champion (2011); Mixed Pairs champion (2021)
Medal record
Men's bowls
Representing New Zealand
World Outdoor Championships
Gold medal – first place	2016 Christchurch	Fours
Gold medal – first place	2008 Christchurch	Team
Gold medal – first place	2016 Christchurch	Team
Bronze medal – third place	2008 Christchurch	Singles
Bronze medal – third place	2012 Adelaide	Triples
Bronze medal – third place	2016 Christchurch	Triples
World Singles Champion of Champions
Gold medal – first place	2004 Australia	Singles
Asia Pacific Bowls Championships
Gold medal – first place	2007 Christchurch	Singles
Gold medal – first place	2009 Kuala Lumpur	Singles
Silver medal – second place	2009 Kuala Lumpur	Triples
Silver medal – second place	2011 Adelaide	Fours
Silver medal – second place	2019 Gold Coast	Triples
Silver medal – second place	2019 Gold Coast	Fours
Bronze medal – third place	2005 Melbourne	Singles
Bronze medal – third place	2011 Adelaide	Triples

Alexander David Forsyth (born 11 December 1979) is a New Zealand international lawn and indoor bowler.

== Bowls career ==
Forsyth from Nelson, in New Zealand, first came to prominence when winning the New Zealand national title which qualified him to compete in the 2004 World Singles Champion of Champions. He won the gold medal defeating David Anderson of Scotland in the final.

=== World Championships ===
He then won a bronze medal in the singles at the 2008 World Outdoor Bowls Championship and a bronze in the triples at the 2012 World Outdoor Bowls Championship in Adelaide. In 2016, he won his sixth national title including the pairs with his father Neville.

In 2016, he won a bronze medal at the 2016 World Outdoor Bowls Championship in Christchurch in the triples with Blake Signal and Mike Nagy before winning a gold medal in the fours with Signal, Nagy and Mike Kernaghan.

In 2020 he was selected for the 2020 World Outdoor Bowls Championship in Australia.

=== Commonwealth Games ===
He was selected as part of the New Zealand team for the 2018 Commonwealth Games on the Gold Coast in Queensland. In 2022, he competed in the men's triples and the men's fours at the 2022 Commonwealth Games.

=== Asia Pacific Championships ===
Forsyth has won seven medals at the Asia Pacific Bowls Championships, including two gold medals in the singles and a double silver in the triples and fours at the 2019 Asia Pacific Bowls Championships in the Gold Coast, Queensland.

=== National ===
At national level Forsyth has won nine titles at the New Zealand National Bowls Championships when bowling for the various bowls clubs. They are the 2003, 2004 and 2013/14 singles for the United and Havelock Bowls Clubs respectively; the pairs three times in 2012/13, 2015/16 and 2017/18 and the fours three times in 2010/11, 2011/12 and 2017/18.
