= Mike Kernaghan =

New Zealand lawn bowls competitor

Personal information
- Nationality: New Zealander
- Born: 22 July 1955 (age 71) Wallasey, England

Sport
- Sport: Lawn bowls
- Club: North East Valley Club, Dunedin
Medal record
Representing New Zealand
World Outdoor Championships
Bronze medal – third place	2016 Christchurch	Pairs
Gold medal – first place	2016 Christchurch	fours
Gold medal – first place	2016 Christchurch	team
Commonwealth Games
Bronze medal – third place	2002 Manchester	Singles
Asia Pacific Bowls Championships
Silver medal – second place	2015 Christchurch	singles
Bronze medal – third place	2015 Christchurch	pairs
Silver medal – second place	2019 Gold Coast	triples
Silver medal – second place	2019 Gold Coast	fours

Mike Kernaghan (born 22 July 1955 in Wallasey, England) is a lawn bowls competitor for New Zealand.

== Bowls career ==
=== World Championship ===
In 2016 he won a bronze medal with Shannon McIlroy at the World Bowls Championship in the Men's Pairs competition in Christchurch before winning a gold medal in the fours with Blake Signal, Mike Nagy and Ali Forsyth.

In 2020 he was selected for the 2020 World Outdoor Bowls Championship in Australia.

=== Commonwealth Games ===
He won a bronze medal in the men's singles at the 2002 Commonwealth Games. He also competed at the 1994 Commonwealth Games, and was a coach at the 1998 Commonwealth Games.

=== Asia Pacific ===
Kernaghan has won four medals at the Asia Pacific Bowls Championships, including double silver in the triples and fours at the 2019 Asia Pacific Bowls Championships in the Gold Coast, Queensland.

=== National ===
He won the 2001, 2002 and 2014/15 singles titles, the 2007 pairs title and 2013/14 fours title at the New Zealand National Bowls Championships when bowling for the Kaikorai Bowls Club.
