= Keshwa Goundar =

Fijian international lawn bowler (born 1957)

Personal information
- Nationality: Fiji
- Born: 27 September 1957 (age 68)
Medal record
Representing Fiji
World Outdoor Championships
Silver medal – second place	2008 Christchurch	Men's triples

Keshwa Goundar (born 1957) is a Fijian international lawn bowler.

In 2008 he won the silver medal in the triples at the 2008 World Outdoor Bowls Championship in Christchurch along with Curtis Mar and Samuela Tuikiligana.
