= Santjie Steyn =

South African international lawn bowler (born 1972)

Personal information
- Nationality: South African
- Born: 20 June 1972 (age 54) Caledon, South Africa
- Height: 5 ft 6 in (168 cm)
- Weight: 80 kg (180 lb)

Sport
- Sport: Lawn bowls
Medal record
Representing South Africa
Women's lawn bowls
Commonwealth Games
Gold medal – first place	2010 Delhi	Women's triples
Gold medal – first place	2014 Glasgow	Women's fours
Bronze medal – third place	2014 Glasgow	Women's triples
World Outdoor Championships
Bronze medal – third place	2012 Adelaide	Women's fours
Atlantic Bowls Championships
Silver medal – second place	2011 Paphos	fours
Bronze medal – third place	2011 Paphos	triples

Susanna Jacoba 'Santjie' Steyn (born 20 June 1972) is a South African lawn bowler.

== Bowls career ==
In 2011 she won the fours silver medal and triples bronze at the Atlantic Bowls Championships.

She competed in the women's fours and the women's triples events at the 2014 Commonwealth Games where she won a gold and bronze medal respectively.

She was selected as part of the South Africa team for the 2018 Commonwealth Games on the Gold Coast in Queensland.
