= Kenta Hasebe =

Japanese lawn bowler

Personal information
- Nationality: Japanese
- Born: 20 May 1991 (age 35)
- Education: North Sydney Boys High School
- Occupation(s): French and Japanese Teacher

Sport
- Sport: Bowls
- Club: North Sydney BC
Medal record
Representing Japan
World Outdoor Championships
Bronze medal – third place	2016 Christchurch	Men's Triples
Asia Pacific Bowls Championships
Bronze medal – third place	2015 Christchurch	singles
Silver medal – second place	2015 Christchurch	triples

Kenta Treacher Hasebe (born 1991) is an Australian who has represented Japan at lawn and indoor bowls.

== Biography ==
Hasebe, a school teacher at Sydney Girls High School, represented Japan in the 2016 World Outdoor Bowls Championship in Christchurch and won a bronze medal in the triples with Hisaharu Satoh and Kenichi Emura. The bronze medal was the first ever bowls medal won by his nation.

=== World Championships ===
In 2020, he was selected for his second World Championship at the 2020 World Outdoor Bowls Championship in Australia but the event was cancelled due to the COVID-19 pandemic.

In 2023, he was selected as part of the team to represent Japan at the 2023 World Outdoor Bowls Championship. He participated in the men's triples and the men's singles events. In the triples his team reached the quarter final before losing to England.

=== Asia Pacific Championships ===
He won two medals at the 2015 Asia Pacific Bowls Championships in Christchurch.
