= Blake Signal =

New Zealand bowls player

Personal information
- Nationality: New Zealander
- Born: 17 January 1982 (age 44) Upper Hutt
- Education: St Patricks College, Silverstream

Sport
- Sport: Bowls
- Club: Stokes Valley, Wellington and Nelson Bay, NSW
Medal record
Representing New Zealand
World Outdoor Championships
Bronze medal – third place	2016 Christchurch	triples
Gold medal – first place	2016 Christchurch	fours
Gold medal – first place	2016 Christchurch	team

Blake Signal (born 17 January 1982) is a New Zealand international lawn and indoor bowler.

== Bowls career ==
Signal has won four New Zealand National Bowls Championships titles (the fours in 2010, 2012 and 2017 and pairs in 2012). Signal won a bronze medal at the 2016 World Outdoor Bowls Championship in Christchurch in the triples with Ali Forsyth and Mike Nagy before winning a gold medal in the fours with Forsyth, Nagy and Mike Kernaghan.

He was selected as part of the New Zealand team for the 2018 Commonwealth Games on the Gold Coast in Queensland.
