= 2008 World Outdoor Bowls Championship =

Bowls championship held in Christchurch, New Zealand

World Outdoor Championships 2008
- 11th World Outdoor Bowls Championships
- Location: Christchurch, New Zealand
- Date: 12–24 January 2008.
- Category: World Bowls Championship

The 2008 World Outdoor Bowls Championship was held at the Burnside Bowling Club in Christchurch, New Zealand, from 12 to 24 January 2008. Safuan Said won the men's singles Gold. New Zealand won the pairs, fours and Leonard Trophy with only Scotland preventing a clean sweep by claiming the triples.

== Medallists ==
Event	Gold	Silver	Bronze	Bronze
Men's singles	(Malaysia) Safuan Said	(Australia) Aron Sherriff	(Canada) Ryan Bester	(New Zealand) Ali Forsyth
Men's pairs	(New Zealand) Russell Meyer; Gary Lawson	(Scotland) Darren Burnett; Billy Mellors	(Malaysia) Safuan Said; Fairul Izwan Abd Muin	(Australia) Aron Sherriff; Nathan Rice
Men's triples	(Scotland) Wayne Hogg; Willie Wood; David Peacock	(Fiji) Samuela Tuikiligana; Curtis Mar; Keshwa Goundar	(Canada) Keith Roney; Chris Stadnyk; Hiren Bhartu	(Malaysia) Azim Azami Ariffin; Azwan Shuhaimi; Mohd Amir Mohd Yusof
Men's fours	(New Zealand) Andrew Todd; Richard Girvan; Russell Meyer; Gary Lawson	(Australia) Nathan Rice; Bill Cornehls; Wayne Turley; Mark Casey	(England) Mark Bantock; Stephen Farish; Robert Newman; Graham Shadwell	(South Africa) Wayne Perry; Clinton Roets; Billy Radloff; Brian Dixon
Men's team	New Zealand	Australia	Malaysia	N/A
Women's singles	(New Zealand) Val Smith	(England) Ellen Falkner	(Malaysia) Siti Zalina Ahmad	(Australia) Kelsey Cottrell
Women's pairs	(New Zealand) Jo Edwards; Val Smith	(England) Wendy King; Ellen Falkner	Bernie O’Neill; Margaret Johnston	(Australia) Lynsey Armitage; Karen Murphy
Women's triples	(South Africa) Sylvia Burns; Loraine Victor; Lorna Trigwell	(Australia) Claire Duke; Julie Keegan; Kelsey Cottrell	(New Zealand) Marina Khan; Jan Khan; Sharon Sims	(Wales) Hannah Smith; Anwen Butten; Kathy Pearce
Women's fours	(Australia) Lynsey Armitage; Claire Duke; Julie Keegan; Karen Murphy	(Wales) Hannah Smith; Anwen Butten; Isabel Jones; Wendy Price	Alison Bell; Donna McNally; Bernie O’Neill; Jennifer Dowds	(Malaysia) Nor Shafeeqah Yahya; Nur Fidrah Noh; Azlina Arshad; Nor Hashimah Ismail
Women's team	Australia	New Zealand	Malaysia	N/A

== Results ==
=== W. M. Leonard Trophy ===
Pos	Team	Singles	Pairs	Triples	Fours	Total
1	New Zealand	21	23	16	23	83
2	Australia	22	20	18	22	82
3	Malaysia	23	21	21	16	81
4	Scotland	17	22	23	18	80
5	Canada	21	19	20	15	75
6	England	15	17	17	21	70
7	South Africa	19	18	12	20	69
8	Ireland	16	11	19	19	65
9	Fiji	13	16	22	12	63
10	Zimbabwe	9	13	13	9	44
11	Hong Kong	7	15	14	8	44
12	Namibia	8	14	7	13	42
13	Wales	10	4	10	17	41
14	Jersey	11	9	6	14	40
15	Papua New Guinea	14	12	3	11	40
16	Spain	12	5	15	5	37
17	Guernsey	18	3	8	4	33
18	Brunei	4	7	11	6	28
19	Israel	2	6	9	10	27
20	Norfolk Island	6	10	2	7	25
21	Cook Islands	5	8	5	2	20
22	Thailand	3	1	4	1	9
23	Argentina	1	2	1	3	7

=== Taylor Trophy ===
Pos	Player	Singles	Pairs	Triples	Fours	Total
1	Australia	22	22	23	24	91
2	New Zealand	24	24	21	20	89
3	Malaysia	21	19	19	22	81
4	England	23	23	15	19	80
5	Scotland	19	18	20	18	75
6	Wales	13	14	22	23	72
7	South Africa	15	16	24	17	72
8	Philippines	16	17	16	16	65
9	Ireland	12	21	11	21	65
10	Canada	20	20	12	13	65
11	Hong Kong	8	10	17	15	50
12	Jersey	11	5	18	12	46
13	Norfolk Island	14	11	8	10	43
14	Fiji	18	9	10	4	41
15	Israel	9	6	13	7	35
16	Namibia	7	8	9	11	35
17	Brunei	4	13	1	14	32
18	Spain	2	7	14	8	31
19	Zambia	1	15	5	9	30
20	(Eswatini) Swaziland	6	12	7	3	28
21	Botswana	17	1	6	1	25
22	Cook Islands	10	4	2	6	22
23	Samoa	5	3	4	2	14
24	Argentina	3	2	3	5	13
