= Kenichi Emura =

Japanese international lawn bowler

Personal information
- Nationality: Japanese
- Born: 23 August 1955 (age 70)

Sport
- Sport: Bowls
- Club: Tweed Heads BC
Medal record
Representing Japan
World Outdoor Championships
Bronze medal – third place	2016 Christchurch	Men's Triples
Asia Pacific Bowls Championships
Silver medal – second place	2015 Christchurch	triples

Kenichi Emura (江村健一, Emura Ken'ichi; born 1955) is a Japanese international lawn bowler.

== Bowls career ==
Emura a computer consultant by trade won the national singles title in 2013 and represented Japan in the 2016 World Outdoor Bowls Championship in Christchurch winning a bronze medal in the triples with Hisaharu Satoh and Kenta Hasebe. The bronze medal was the first ever bowls medal won by the nation.

He won a triples silver medal at the 2015 Asia Pacific Bowls Championships in Christchurch.

In 2023, he was selected as part of the team to represent Japan at the 2023 World Outdoor Bowls Championship. He participated in the men's triples and the men's fours events. In the triples his team reached the quarter final before losing to England.
