= Esme Steyn =

South African international lawn bowler (born 1953)

Personal information
- Nationality: South African
- Born: 22 March 1953 (age 73) Durban, South Africa
- Height: 5 ft 4 in (163 cm)
- Weight: 60 kg (130 lb)

Sport
- Sport: Lawn bowls
- Club: Linden BC
Medal record
Women's lawn bowls
Representing South Africa
Commonwealth Games
Gold medal – first place	2014 Glasgow	Women's fours
Bronze medal – third place	2014 Glasgow	Women's triples
World Outdoor Championships
Bronze medal – third place	2012 Adelaide	Women's fours
Atlantic Bowls Championships
Gold medal – first place	2005 Bangor	pairs

Esme Steyn (born 22 March 1953) is a South African international lawn bowler.

== Bowls career ==
In 2005 she won the pairs gold medal at the Atlantic Bowls Championships.

She competed in the women's fours and the women's triples events at the 2014 Commonwealth Games where she won a gold and bronze medal respectively.

She was selected as part of the South Africa team for the 2018 Commonwealth Games on the Gold Coast in Queensland.

She won the 2011 & 2012 singles at the National Championships bowling for the Linden Bowls Club.
