= Nor Hashimah Ismail =

Malaysian lawn bowler (born 1971)

Personal information
- Nationality: Malaysian
- Born: 6 April 1971 (age 55) Selangor, Malaysia
- Height: 5 ft 2 in (157 cm)
- Weight: 63 kg (139 lb)
Medal record
Representing Malaysia
Women's lawn bowls
World Outdoor Championships
Bronze medal – third place	2008 Christchurch	fours
Bronze medal – third place	2008 Christchurch	team
Bronze medal – third place	2016 Christchurch	triples
Commonwealth Games
Bronze medal – third place	1998 Kuala Lumpur	fours
Gold medal – first place	2006 Melbourne	triples
Silver medal – second place	2010 Delhi	pairs
Silver medal – second place	2014 Glasgow	fours
Asia Pacific Bowls Championships
Bronze medal – third place	1995 Dunedin	triples
Bronze medal – third place	1997 Warilla	triples
Silver medal – second place	1999 Kuala Lumpur	fours
Bronze medal – third place	1999 Kuala Lumpur	pairs
Gold medal – first place	2003 Brisbane	triples
Silver medal – second place	2003 Brisbane	fours
Silver medal – second place	2005 Melbourne	triples
Silver medal – second place	2007 Chrustchurch	fours
Gold medal – first place	2009 Kuala Lumpur	pairs
Gold medal – first place	2009 Kuala Lumpur	fours
Bronze medal – third place	2015 Christchurch	fours
Southeast Asian Games
Gold medal – first place	1999 Bandar Seri Begawan	pairs
Gold medal – first place	2001 Kuala Lumpur	pairs
Gold medal – first place	2005 Angeles City	triples
Gold medal – first place	2007 Nakhon Ratchasima	riples
Gold medal – first place	2017 Kuala Lumpur	fours
Asian Lawn Bowls Championship
Gold medal – first place	2003 Kuala Lumpur	fours
Gold medal – first place	2005 Kuala Lumpur	pairs
Gold medal – first place	2005 Kuala Lumpur	fours

Nor Hashimah Ismail (born 6 April 1971) is a Malaysian lawn bowler.

== Bowls career ==
=== World Championships ===
In 2008, Ismail won a bronze medal in the fours at the 2008 World Outdoor Bowls Championship. Eight years later in 2016, she won a second bronze medal, with Azlina Arshad and Nur Fidrah Noh in the triples at the 2016 World Outdoor Bowls Championship in Christchurch.

=== Commonwealth Games ===
Nor competed in both the women's pairs and women's fours events at the 2014 Commonwealth Games. She failed to qualify from the group stages in the women's pairs event but won a silver medal in the women's fours

=== Other events ===
She has won eleven medals at the Asia Pacific Bowls Championships including three gold medals. In 2010, she won the Hong Kong International Bowls Classic singles title and previously had won the 2008 pairs title with Siti Zalina Ahmad.

She has also won four gold medals in the Lawn bowls at the Southeast Asian Games.
