= Susan Nel =

South African international lawn bowler (born 1956)

Personal information
- Nationality: South African
- Born: 27 August 1956 (age 69) Shabani, Southern Rhodesia
- Height: 5 ft 6 in (168 cm)
- Weight: 84 kg (185 lb)

Sport
- Sport: lawn bowls
- Club: Rustenberg Impala BC
Medal record
Representing South Africa
World Outdoor Championships
Bronze medal – third place	2012 Adelaide	fours
Bronze medal – third place	2016 Christchurch	triples
Commonwealth Games
Gold medal – first place	2010 Delhi	triples
Gold medal – first place	2014 Glasgow	fours
Bronze medal – third place	2014 Glasgow	triples
Atlantic Bowls Championships
Silver medal – second place	2009 Johannesburg	fours
Silver medal – second place	2011 Paphos	fours
Bronze medal – third place	2011 Paphos	triples
Bronze medal – third place	2015 Paphos	triples
Bronze medal – third place	2015 Paphos	fours

Susanna Sophie Nel (born 27 August 1956) is a South African international lawn bowler.

== Bowls career ==
In 2009 she won the fours silver medal at the Atlantic Bowls Championships and in 2011 she won the fours silver medal and triples bronze at the Atlantic Bowls Championships.

She competed in the women's fours and the women's triples events at the 2014 Commonwealth Games where she won a gold and bronze medal respectively. She was the 2014 pairs runner-up at the National Championships, bowling for the Rustenberg Impala Bowls Club.

Nel picked up two bronze medals at the Atlantic Bowls Championships held at Cyprus (30 November – 13 December 2015), in the triples (along with Anneke Snyman and Sylvia Burns) and the fours.

In 2016, she won a bronze medal with Elma Davis and Sylvia Burns in the triples at the 2016 World Outdoor Bowls Championship in Christchurch.

She was selected as part of the South Africa team for the 2018 Commonwealth Games on the Gold Coast in Queensland.
