= Kelsey Cottrell =

Australian lawn bowler (born 1990)

Personal information
- Nationality: Australian
- Born: 31 May 1990 (age 36) Auckland, New Zealand

Sport
- Sport: Bowls
- Club: St Johns Park

Achievements and titles
- Highest world ranking: 1 (June 2024)
Medal record
Representing Australia
World Outdoor Championships
Gold medal – first place	2008 Christchurch	Team
Bronze medal – third place	2008 Christchurch	Singles
Silver medal – second place	2008 Christchurch	Triples
Gold medal – first place	2012 Adelaide	Pairs
Gold medal – first place	2012 Adelaide	Team
Gold medal – first place	2016 Christchurch	Fours
Gold medal – first place	2016 Christchurch	Team
Gold medal – first place	2023 Gold Coast	triples
Silver medal – second place	2023 Gold Coast	fours
Bronze medal – third place	2023 Gold Coast	team
Commonwealth Games
Bronze medal – third place	2010 Delhi	Singles
Silver medal – second place	2014 Glasgow	Triples
Gold medal – first place	2018 Gold Coast	Fours
Asia Pacific Bowls Championships
Silver medal – second place	2007 Christchurch	triples
Bronze medal – third place	2007 Christchurch	fours
Bronze medal – third place	2009 Kuala Lumpur	singles
Silver medal – second place	2009 Kuala Lumpur	triples
Silver medal – second place	2011 Adelaide	singles
Gold medal – first place	2011 Adelaide	triples
Gold medal – first place	2015 Christchurch	pairs
Gold medal – first place	2015 Christchurch	fours
Gold medal – first place	2019 Gold Coast	pairs
WB Indoor Championships
Gold medal – first place	2023 Warilla	mixed pairs

Kelsey May Cottrell (born 31 May 1990) is an Australian international lawn bowler. She reached a career high ranking of world number 1 in June 2024.

== Bowls career ==
=== World Championships ===
Outdoor

Cottrell won three medals at the 2008 World Outdoor Bowls Championship in Christchurch, New Zealand. Four years later she won the gold medal in the pairs competition with Rebecca Quail and a team gold at the 2012 World Outdoor Bowls Championship.

In 2016, Cottrell was part of the fours team with Natasha Scott, Rebecca Van Asch and Carla Krizanic who won the gold medal at the 2016 World Outdoor Bowls Championship in Christchurch, in addition to a team gold.

In 2020, she was selected for the 2020 World Outdoor Bowls Championship in Australia but the event was cancelled due to the COVID-19 pandemic. In 2023, she was selected as part of the team to represent Australia at the 2023 World Outdoor Bowls Championship. She participated in the women's triples and the women's fours events. In the fours, her team won the silver medal after losing to England in the final. One week later in the triples (partnering Lynsey Clarke and Dawn Hayman), the team won the group undefeated and reached the final against New Zealand, going on to win the gold medal.

Indoor

In 2023, she won the mixed pairs gold with Aron Sherriff at the 2023 World Bowls Indoor Championships.

=== Commonwealth Games ===
Cottrell competed in the 2010 Commonwealth Games where she won a bronze medal in the singles. Four years later she won a silver in the triples at the 2014 Commonwealth Games.

Cottrell was part of the Australian team for the 2018 Commonwealth Games on the Gold Coast in Queensland where she claimed another gold medal in the Fours with Krizanic, Scott and Van Asch once again.

She was a batonbearer for the 2022 Commonwealth Games Queen's Baton Relay when the baton came to Broadbeach Bowls Club in Gold Coast in March 2022.

=== International ===
Cottrell has won nine medals at the Asia Pacific Bowls Championships. The medal haul includes four gold medals, the latest at the 2019 Asia Pacific Bowls Championships in the Gold Coast, Queensland. Cottrell has won the Hong Kong International Bowls Classic pairs title three times, twice with Julie Keegan (2009, 2010) and once with Carla Odgers (2013).

=== National ===
Although born in Auckland she became the third overseas player to have won the singles title at the New Zealand National Bowls Championships when bowling as an invitational player in 2015/16.

In 2018, she won the pairs title at the Australian National Bowls Championships and in 2021, she won her 7th & 8th Australian Open crown, this time in the pairs and fours. A second national title was won in 2021 (in the pairs). In 2022, she won his 9th and 10th titles at the Australian Open.

In 2025, she won the Australian Open fours title, her 11th success at the Open.
