= Natasha Scott =

Australian lawn bowler (born 1990)

Personal information
- Nationality: Australian
- Born: Natasha Van Eldik; 27 November 1990 (age 35) Maitland, New South Wales

Sport
- Sport: Bowls
- Club: Maitland City BC

Achievements and titles
- Highest world ranking: 19 (June 2024)
Medal record
Women's lawn bowls
Representing Australia
World Outdoor Championships
Gold medal – first place	2012 Adelaide	triples
Gold medal – first place	2012 Adelaide	team
Gold medal – first place	2016 Christchurch	fours
Gold medal – first place	2016 Christchurch	triples
Gold medal – first place	2016 Christchurch	team
Commonwealth Games
Gold medal – first place	2018 Gold Coast	fours
Gold medal – first place	2018 Gold Coast	triples
Asia Pacific Bowls Championships
Bronze medal – third place	2011 Adelaide	pairs
Gold medal – first place	2015 Christchurch	fours
Silver medal – second place	2015 Christchurch	triples
Gold medal – first place	2019 Gold Coast	triples
Bronze medal – third place	2019 Gold Coast	fours

Natasha Scott (née Van Eldik, born 27 November 1990) is an Australian international lawn bowler. She reached a career high ranking of world number 19 in June 2024.

== World Championship ==
She won the lawn bowls gold medal in the triples competition at the 2012 World Outdoor Bowls Championship in addition to the team event.

In 2016, she was part of the fours team with Rebecca Van Asch, Carla Krizanic and Kelsey Cottrell who won the gold medal at the 2016 World Outdoor Bowls Championship in Christchurch and a gold medal in the triples with Van Asch and Krizanic. A third gold medal was inevitable in the team event.

In 2020, she was selected for the 2020 World Outdoor Bowls Championship in Australia but the event was cancelled due to the COVID-19 pandemic. Despite winning another Australian Open in 2023, she missed out on selection for the 2023 World Championships.

== Commonwealth Games ==
She was part of the Australian team for the 2018 Commonwealth Games on the Gold Coast in Queensland where she claimed two more gold medals in the Fours with Cottrell, Krizanic and Van Asch and the Triples with Krizanic and Van Asch.

In 2022, she competed in the women's triples and the Women's fours at the 2022 Commonwealth Games.

== International ==
Scott has won five medals at the Asia Pacific Bowls Championships, two of which were gold, the latest at the 2019 Asia Pacific Bowls Championships in the Gold Coast, Queensland. In 2018, she won the Hong Kong International Bowls Classic pairs title with Ellen Ryan.

== National ==
In 2021, playing under the name Van Eldik she won the pairs (with Genevieve Delves) and triples (with Davis and Kate Matthews) at the delayed 2020 Australian National Bowls Championships. This was her third national title after previously winning the 2017 triples. She also has five Australian Open titles to her name (2015, 2016, 2019, 2021 and 2023).

In 2023, Van Eldik won the Australian Nationals triples title with Kate Matthews and Genevieve Delves.

== Personal life ==
On 7 January 2014 Van Eldik married fellow Raymond Terrace BC player Lennon Scott.

Scott separated from Scott in 2019 and has since gone back to maiden name, Van Eldik.
