= Andrew Knapper =

English lawn bowler (born 1981)

Personal information
- Nationality: English
- Born: 2 September 1981 (age 44) Taplow, England
- Height: 5 ft 10 in (178 cm)
- Weight: 90 kg (200 lb)

Sport
- Sport: Lawn bowls
- Club: Tilehurst BC
Medal record
Representing England
Commonwealth Games
Silver medal – second place	2014 Glasgow	Men's fours
Bronze medal – third place	2014 Glasgow	Men's pairs
World Outdoor Championships
Gold medal – first place	2016 Christchurch	triples
Atlantic Bowls Championships
Bronze medal – third place	2015 Paphos	triples

Andrew Knapper (born 2 September 1981) is an English former international lawn bowler.

== Bowls career ==
Knapper competed for England in both the men's fours and the men's pairs events at the 2014 Commonwealth Games where he won a silver and bronze medal respectively. In 2015 he won the triples bronze medal at the Atlantic Bowls Championships.

In 2016 he was part of the triples team with Robert Paxton and Jamie Walker who won the gold medal at 2016 World Outdoor Bowls Championship in Christchurch.

He won the National Championship triples in 2013 and 2019.

In 2020 he was selected for the 2020 World Outdoor Bowls Championship in Australia.

Knapper announced his retirement from international bowls in June 2021.
