= Elma Davis =

South African lawn bowler (1968–2019)

Personal information
- Nationality: South African
- Born: 1 April 1968
- Died: 14 April 2019 (aged 51)

Sport
- Sport: Lawn bowls
- Club: George Bowling Club
Medal record
World Outdoor Championships
Representing South Africa
Bronze medal – third place	2016 Christchurch	Women's triples
Commonwealth Games
Silver medal – second place	2018 Gold Coast	Women's fours

Elma Davis (1 April 1968 – 14 April 2019) was a South African international lawn bowler.

== Bowls career ==
In 2016, Davis won a bronze medal with Susan Nel and Sylvia Burns in the triples at the 2016 World Outdoor Bowls Championship in Christchurch.

Davis was part of the South African team for the 2018 Commonwealth Games on the Gold Coast in Queensland where she claimed a silver medal in the Fours with Esme Kruger, Johanna Snyman and Nicolene Neal.

Davis was a five times winner of the National Championships (three in fours and two in pairs) bowling for the George Bowls Club.

== Death ==
On 14 April 2019, Davis died during an apparent murder suicide perpetrated by her husband.
