= Rebecca Van Asch =

Australian Lawn bowler (born 1988)

Rebecca Van Asch (née Quail)
Personal information
- Nationality: Australian
- Born: Rebecca Quail; 2 March 1988 (age 38)

Sport
- Sport: Bowls
- Club: Invermay
Medal record
Representing Australia
World Outdoor Championships
Gold medal – first place	2012 Adelaide	pairs
Gold medal – first place	2012 Adelaide	team
Gold medal – first place	2016 Christchurch	fours
Gold medal – first place	2016 Christchurch	triples
Gold medal – first place	2016 Christchurch	team
Commonwealth Games
Gold medal – first place	2018 Gold Coast	fours
Gold medal – first place	2018 Gold Coast	triples
Asia Pacific Bowls Championships
Gold medal – first place	2011 Adelaide	triples
Silver medal – second place	2011 Adelaide	fours
Gold medal – first place	2019 Gold Coast	triples
Bronze medal – third place	2019 Gold Coast	fours

Rebecca Van Asch (née Quail, born 2 March 1988) is an Australian lawn bowler.

== Bowls career ==
=== World Championship ===
She won the lawn bowls gold medal in the pairs competition with Kelsey Cottrell at the 2012 World Outdoor Bowls Championship in addition to the team event.

In 2016, she was part of the fours team with Carla Krizanic, Natasha Scott and Kelsey Cottrell who won the gold medal at the 2016 World Outdoor Bowls Championship in Christchurch, a second gold medal in the triples with Scott and Krizanic and a third gold in the team event.

In 2020 she was selected for the 2020 World Outdoor Bowls Championship in Australia.

=== Commonwealth Games ===
She was part of the Australian team for the 2018 Commonwealth Games on the Gold Coast in Queensland where she claimed two more gold medals in the Fours with Cottrell, Scott and Krizanic and the Triples with Scott and Krizanic.

In 2022, she competed in the women's triples and the Women's fours at the 2022 Commonwealth Games.

=== Asia Pacific ===
Van Asch has won four medals at the Asia Pacific Bowls Championships including two gold medals, the latest at the 2019 Asia Pacific Bowls Championships in the Gold Coast, Queensland.

=== Nationals ===
Van Asch has won an Australian National Bowls Championships title (2021) and six Australian Opens (2014, 2016, 2018, 2019, 2022, 2025). In 2022, she won his 5th title at the Australian Open and in 2025, won fours again.
