= Rebecca Wigfield =

English lawn and indoor bowls player

Personal information
- Nationality: British (English)
- Born: 8 August 1988 (age 37) Kettering, England

Sport
- Sport: Bowls
- Club: Desborough Town
Medal record
Representing England
World Outdoor Championships
Silver medal – second place	2016 Christchurch	fours
Atlantic Bowls Championships
Bronze medal – third place	2015 Paphos	pairs
Bronze medal – third place	2015 Paphos	fours
Bronze medal – third place	2019 Cardiff	pairs
British Isles Championships
Gold medal – first place	2016	fours
European Championships
Gold medal – first place	2017 Jersey	pairs

Rebecca Louise Wigfield is an English international bowls player.

== Career history ==
Rebecca Wigfield has won two National Championships; in 2013 she won the National Two‐Wood Singles followed by the 2015 National Fours. In 2016, she won the Bowls England Women’s National Champion of Champions.

The bowler who represents Northamptonshire was part of the fours team with Wendy King, Jamie-Lea Winch and Ellen Falkner who won the silver medal at the 2016 World Outdoor Bowls Championship in Christchurch.

In 2015, she won the pairs and fours bronze medals at the Atlantic Bowls Championships and in 2019 she once again won the pairs bronze medal at the Atlantic Bowls Championships.

In 2023, she represented England in the British Isles series.
