= Emma Woodcock =

Welsh international lawn and indoor bowler

Personal information
- Nationality: Wales
- Born: Emma Moorhouse; 9 November 1976 (age 49) Knighton
- Education: John Beddoes School, Presteigne
- Occupation: Accountant

Sport
- Sport: Lawn bowls
- Club: Cardiff Bowling Club
- Partner: Matthew Woodcock
Medal record
World Outdoor Championships
| Silver medal – second place | 2016 Christchurch | Women's triples |
| Silver medal – second place | 2016 Christchurch | Women's team |

Emma Woodcock (born 9 November 1976) is a Welsh international lawn and indoor bowler.

== Profile ==
In 2016, she won a silver medal with Kathy Pearce and Anwen Butten in the triples at the 2016 World Outdoor Bowls Championship in Christchurch.

She was selected as part of the Welsh team for the 2018 Commonwealth Games on the Gold Coast in Queensland

== Achievements ==
- Silver medal - 2016 World Outdoor Bowls Championship - Women's Triples
- 2009 Welsh Rinks
- 2010, 2011, 2012 Welsh Double Rink
- 2014 Welsh Singles
- 2015 Welsh Mixed Pairs
- 2016 Welsh Champion of Champions
