= Alison Bell (bowls) =

Northern Irish international lawn bowler

Personal information
- Nationality: Northern Ireland
- Born: 1983 (age 42–43)

Sport
- Sport: Lawn bowls
- Club: Portadown
Medal record
Representing Ireland
World Outdoor Championships
Bronze medal – third place	2008 Christchurch	fours

Alison Bell (born 1983) is a Northern Irish international lawn bowler.

Bell won the bronze medal in the fours at the 2008 World Outdoor Bowls Championship in Christchurch.
