= Hisaharu Satoh =

Japanese international lawn bowler

Personal information
- Nationality: Japanese

Sport
- Sport: Bowls
- Club: Harboard LBC
Medal record
Representing Japan
World Outdoor Championships
Bronze medal – third place	2016 Christchurch	Men's Triples
Asia Pacific Bowls Championships
Silver medal – second place	2015 Christchurch	triples

Hisaharu Satoh is a Japanese international lawn bowler.

== Bowls career ==
He won a triples silver medal at the 2015 Asia Pacific Bowls Championships in Christchurch.

Satoh represented Japan in the 2016 World Outdoor Bowls Championship in Christchurch winning a bronze medal in the triples with Kenichi Emura and Kenta Hasebe. The bronze medal was the first ever bowls medal won by the nation.

In 2020, he was selected for the 2020 World Outdoor Bowls Championship in Australia but the event was cancelled due to the COVID-19 pandemic.

In 2023, he was selected as part of the team to represent Japan at the 2023 World Outdoor Bowls Championship. He participated in the men's triples and the men's fours events. In the triples his team reached the quarter final before losing to England.
