= Carla Krizanic =

Australian international lawn bowler (born 1990)

Personal information
- Nickname: Odgy
- Nationality: Australian
- Born: 26 April 1990 (age 36) Castlemaine, Victoria, Australia
- Height: 1.64 m (5 ft 5 in)
- Weight: 53 kg (117 lb)

Sport
- Sport: Bowls
- Club: Sunbury
Medal record
Representing Australia
World Outdoor Championships
Gold medal – first place	2016 Christchurch	Fours
Gold medal – first place	2016 Christchurch	Triples
Gold medal – first place	2016 Christchurch	Team
Commonwealth Games
Gold medal – first place	2018 Gold Coast	Fours
Gold medal – first place	2018 Gold Coast	Triples
World Champion of Champions
Silver medal – second place	2022 Wellington	singles
Asia Pacific Bowls Championships
Gold medal – first place	2015 Christchurch	fours
Silver medal – second place	2015 Christchurch	triples
Gold medal – first place	2019 Gold Coast	triples
Bronze medal – third place	2019 Gold Coast	fours

Carla Krizanic (née Odgers; born 26 April 1990) is an Australian international lawn bowler.

== Bowls career ==
=== World Championships ===
In 2016, she was part of the fours team with Rebecca Van Asch, Natasha Scott and Kelsey Cottrell who won the gold medal at the 2016 World Outdoor Bowls Championship in Christchurch and a gold medal in the triples with Scott and Van Asch.

=== Commonwealth Games ===
She was part of the Australian team for the 2018 Commonwealth Games on the Gold Coast in Queensland where she won two more gold medals in the Fours with Cottrell, Scott and Van Asch and the Triples with Scott and Van Asch.

=== Other major events ===
Krizanic has won four medals at the Asia Pacific Bowls Championships including two golds. The latest gold medal was at the 2019 Asia Pacific Bowls Championships in the Gold Coast, Queensland. In November 2022, he won the silver medal at the World Singles Champion of Champions in Wellington, New Zealand.

== Personal life ==
Carla married Tristan Krizanic in 2015; she had previously represented Australia as Carla Odgers.
