= Candy DeFazio =

American lawn bowler

Personal information
- Nationality: United States
- Born: 31 May 1950 (age 76)

Sport
- Club: Long Beach LBC
Medal record
Representing United States
Asia Pacific Bowls Championships
Silver medal – second place	2015 Christchurch	fours

Candace 'Candy' DeFazio (born 1950) is a United States lawn bowls international competitor.

== Bowls career ==
=== World Championship ===
DeFazio competed at the 2016 World Outdoor Bowls Championship in Christchurch and four years later in 2020 was selected for the 2020 World Outdoor Bowls Championship in Australia.

=== Asia Pacific ===
She won a fours silver medal at the 2015 Asia Pacific Bowls Championships in Christchurch, New Zealand.
