= Jamie-Lea Winch =

British lawn bowler (born 1990)

Jamie-Lea Marshall née Jamie-Lea Winch
Personal information
- Nationality: British (English)
- Born: 18 October 1990 (age 35) Northampton, England

Sport
- Club: Kingscroft BC
Medal record
Representing England
World Outdoor Championships
Silver medal – second place	2016 Christchurch	fours
Gold medal – first place	2023 Gold Coast	fours
Silver medal – second place	2023 Gold Coast	team
Commonwealth Games
Silver medal – second place	2014 Glasgow	pairs
Bronze medal – third place	2010 Delhi	triples
Gold medal – first place	2022 Birmingham	triples
Atlantic Bowls Championships
Silver medal – second place	2015 Paphos	triples
Bronze medal – third place	2015 Paphos	fours
Gold medal – first place	2019 Cardiff	triples
European Championships
Silver medal – second place	2013 Jersey	pairs
Gold medal – first place	2013 Jersey	mixed four
Gold medal – first place	2013 Jersey	team
Gold medal – first place	2017 Jersey	pairs

Jamie-Lea Marshall (née Jamie-Lea Winch) (born 18 October 1990) is an English international lawn bowler.

== Bowls career ==
Jamie competed for England in the women's pairs at the 2014 Commonwealth Games where she won a silver medal with Natalie Melmore.

In 2015 she won the triples silver medal and fours bronze medal at the Atlantic Bowls Championships and in 2016, she was part of the fours team with Rebecca Wigfield, Wendy King and Ellen Falkner who won the silver medal at the 2016 World Outdoor Bowls Championship in Christchurch.

She has won four National Championships including the singles in 2019. Also during 2019 she won the triples gold medal at the Atlantic Bowls Championships.

In 2022, she competed in the women's triples and the Women's fours at the 2022 Commonwealth Games. She won the gold medal in the triples with Sian Honnor and Natalie Chestney.

In 2023, she was selected as part of the team to represent England at the 2023 World Outdoor Bowls Championship. She participated in the women's triples and the women's fours events. In the fours, her team won the gold medal defeating Australia in the final.
