= Sylvia Burns =

South African international lawn bowler

Personal information
- Nationality: South African
- Born: 12 May 1955 (age 71) Cape Town, South Africa

Sport
- Sport: lawn bowls
- Club: Mowbray BC
Medal record
Representing South Africa
World Outdoor Championships
Gold medal – first place	2008 Christchurch	triples
Bronze medal – third place	2016 Christchurch	triples
Atlantic Bowls Championships
Silver medal – second place	2007 Ayr	fours
Silver medal – second place	2009 Johannesburg	fours
Bronze medal – third place	2015 Paphos	triples
Bronze medal – third place	2015 Paphos	fours

Sylvia Burns is a South African international lawn bowler.

== Bowls career ==
She won a gold medal in the Women's Triples at the 2008 World Outdoor Bowls Championship in Christchurch.

In 2007, she won the fours silver medal at the Atlantic Bowls Championships

In 2009 she won another fours silver medal at the Atlantic Bowls Championships and in 2015 she won the triples and fours bronze medals at the Atlantic Bowls Championships.

In 2016, she won a bronze medal with Susan Nel and Elma Davis in the triples at the 2016 World Outdoor Bowls Championship in Christchurch.

She won the 2017 pairs title at the National Championships bowling for the Edgemead Bowls Club.
