= Nur Fidrah Noh =

Malaysian lawn bowler (born 1986)

Personal information
- Nationality: Malaysian
- Born: 16 May 1986 (age 40) Johor, Malaysia
- Height: 5 ft 0 in (152 cm)
- Weight: 65 kg (143 lb)
Medal record
Representing Malaysia
World Outdoor Championships
Bronze medal – third place	2008 Christchurch	fours
Bronze medal – third place	2008 Christchurch	team
Silver medal – second place	2012 Adelaide	fours
Bronze medal – third place	2016 Christchurch	triples
Commonwealth Games
Silver medal – second place	2014 Glasgow	fours
Asia Pacific Bowls Championships
Gold medal – first place	2007 Christchurch	triples
Gold medal – first place	2009 Kuala Lumpur	triples
Gold medal – first place	2009 Kuala Lumpur	fours
Bronze medal – third place	2015 Christchurch	fours
Bronze medal – third place	2019 Gold Coast	pairs
Silver medal – second place	2019 Gold Coast	fours
Southeast Asian Games
Gold medal – first place	2007 Nakhon Ratchasima	triples
Gold medal – first place	2017 Kuala Lumpur	fours

Nur Fidrah Noh (born 16 May 1986) is a Malaysian lawn bowler.

== Bowls career ==
=== World Championship ===
Noh won a bronze medal in the fours at the 2008 World Outdoor Bowls Championship in Christchurch, New Zealand and fours year later won a silver medal in the fours at the 2012 World Outdoor Bowls Championship in Adelaide.

In 2016, she won a bronze medal with Azlina Arshad and Nor Hashimah Ismail in the triples at the 2016 World Outdoor Bowls Championship in Christchurch.

=== Commonwealth Games ===
In 2014 she competed in both the women's triples and women's fours events at the 2014 Commonwealth Games. She failed to qualify from the group stages in the women's triples event but won a silver medal in the women's fours

=== Asia Pacific ===
Noh has won six medals at the Asia Pacific Bowls Championshipsincluding three gold medals and two medals at the 2019 Asia Pacific Bowls Championships in the Gold Coast, Queensland.

=== Southeast Asian Games ===
In addition to the major medals won she has also won two gold medals in the Lawn bowls at the Southeast Asian Games.

=== National ===
She won the 2007 singles title at the New Zealand National Bowls Championships when bowling as an overseas invitational player.
