= Kathy Pearce =

Welsh bowls player (born 1963)

Personal information
- Nationality: British (Welsh)
- Born: 16 February 1963 (age 63) Berriew, Welshpool, Wales

Sport
- Club: Berriew
Medal record
Representing Wales
World Outdoor Championships
Bronze medal – third place	2004 Leamington Spa	fours
Bronze medal – third place	2004 Leamington Spa	team
Bronze medal – third place	2008 Christchurch	triples
Bronze medal – third place	2012 Adelaide	triples
Bronze medal – third place	2012 Adelaide	fours
Silver medal – second place	2016 Christchurch	triples
Silver medal – second place	2016 Christchurch	team
World Singles Champion of Champions
Gold medal – first place	2008 Aberdeen	singles
Atlantic Bowls Championships
Gold medal – first place	1997 Llandrindod Wells	triples
Silver medal – second place	1997 Llandrindod Wells	fours
Silver medal – second place	2007 Ayr	triples
Gold medal – first place	2009 Johannesburg	triples
Silver medal – second place	2009 Johannesburg	singles
Silver medal – second place	2015 Paphos	fours

Katharine Anne Pearce (born 16 February 1963) is a Welsh international lawn and indoor bowler.

== Bowls career ==
Pearce from Berriew, Welshpool won the triples gold medal and fours silver medal at the 1997 Atlantic Bowls Championships In Llandrindod wells.

In 2004 she won a bronze medal at the 2004 World Outdoor Bowls Championship in the fours and in 2007 won the triples silver medal at the Atlantic Championships.

The following year she won another World bronze at the 2008 World Outdoor Bowls Championship. Also, in 2008 she won the World Singles Champion of Champions event gold medal defeating Lorraine Malloy of Scotland in the final at Aberdeen.

In 2009 she won the singles silver medal and the triples gold medal at the Atlantic Championships in Johannesburg.

She then won two more bronze medals in the triples and fours at the 2012 World Outdoor Bowls Championship in Adelaide.

In 2015 she won the fours silver medal at the Atlantic Bowls Championships.

In 2016, she won a silver medal with Emma Woodcock and Anwen Butten in the triples at the 2016 World Outdoor Bowls Championship in Christchurch.
