= Wendy King =

English lawn and indoor bowls player

Personal information
- Nationality: British (English)
- Born: 2 November 1962 (age 63)

Sport
- Sport: Bowls
- Club: Appleyard BC / Milton Regis
Medal record
Representing England
World Outdoor Championships
Silver medal – second place	2008 Christchurch	pairs
Silver medal – second place	2016 Christchurch	fours
Atlantic Bowls Championships
Bronze medal – third place	2015 Paphos	pairs
Bronze medal – third place	2015 Paphos	fours
European Championships
Gold medal – first place	2013 Spain	mixed
Gold medal – first place	2013 Spain	team
Silver medal – second place	2013 Spain	pairs

Wendy Jean King is an English international bowls player.

== Bowls career ==
Wendy King won a silver medal at the 2008 World Outdoor Bowls Championship pairs and competed in the 2012 World Outdoor Bowls Championship and 2016 World Outdoor Bowls Championship.

The bowler who represents Kent has won three National titles; in 2001 she won the National Triples followed by the 2006 and 2009 Two Wood Singles Championship.

In 2013, she won three medals at the European Bowls Championships in Spain and in 2015, she won the pairs and fours bronze medals at the Atlantic Bowls Championships.

In 2016, she was part of the fours team with Rebecca Wigfield, Jamie-Lea Winch and Ellen Falkner who won the silver medal at the 2016 World Outdoor Bowls Championship in Christchurch.

In 2023, she represented England in the British Isles series.
