= Anwen Butten =

Welsh international Bowls competitor

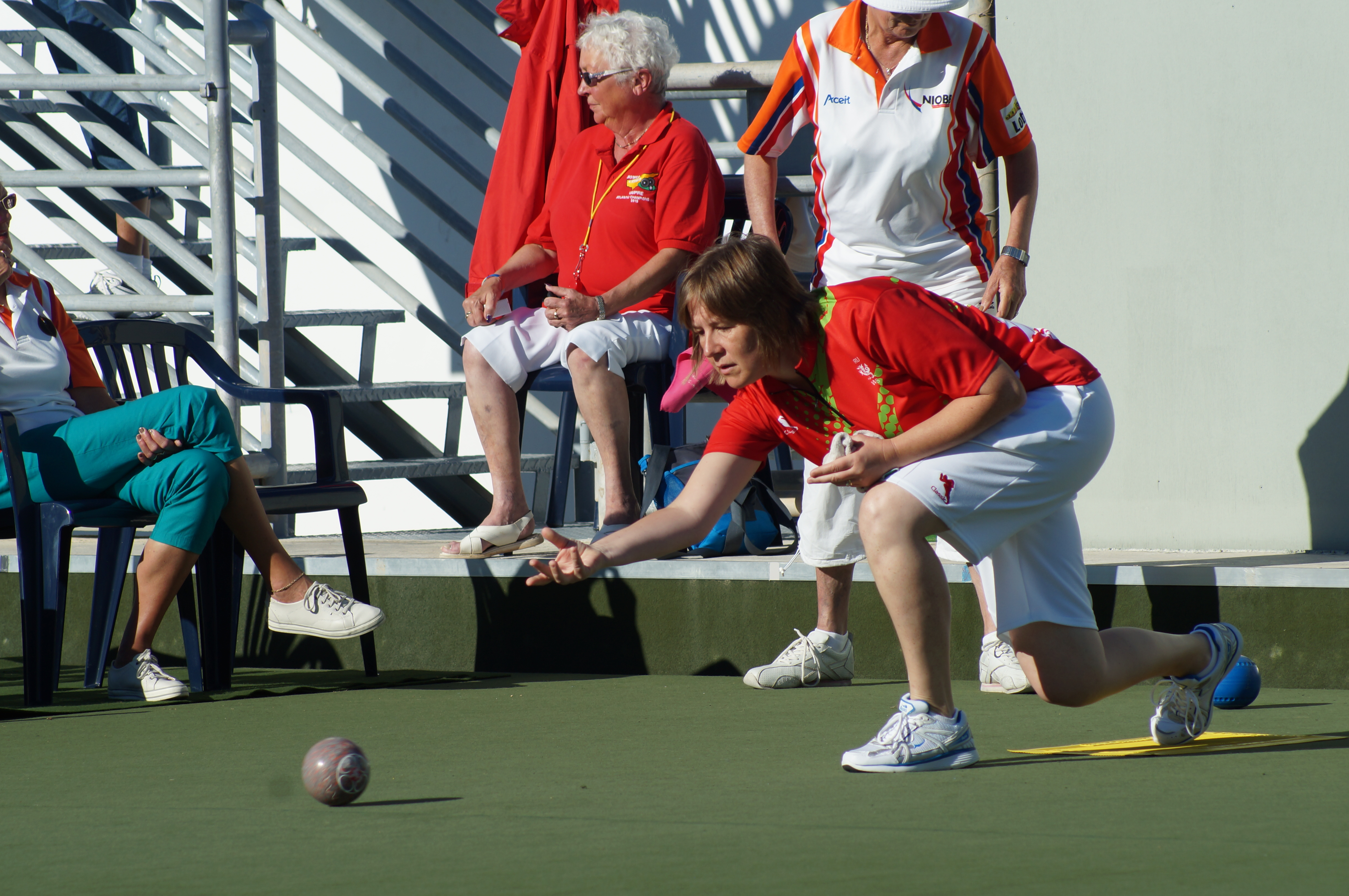

Personal information
- Nationality: British (Welsh)
- Born: 28 August 1972 (age 53) Carmarthen, Wales

Sport
- Club: Lampeter BC
Medal record
Representing Wales
World Outdoor Championships
Bronze medal – third place	2004 Leamington Spa	fours
Bronze medal – third place	2004 Leamington Spa	team
Silver medal – second place	2008 Christchurch	fours
Bronze medal – third place	2008 Christchurch	triples
Bronze medal – third place	2012 Adelaide	fours
Silver medal – second place	2016 Christchurch	triples
Silver medal – second place	2016 Christchurch	team
Commonwealth Games
Bronze medal – third place	2002 Manchester	pairs
Bronze medal – third place	2010 Delhi	pairs
Atlantic Bowls Championships
Silver medal – second place	2007 Ayr	triples
Gold medal – first place	2009 Johannesburg	fours
Silver medal – second place	2015 Paphos	fours
Gold medal – first place	2019 Cardiff	fours
British Isles Championships
Gold medal – first place	2018	fours
Gold medal – first place	2024	pairs
Welsh Nationals
Gold medal – first place	2011, 2015, 2024	fours
Gold medal – first place	2012, 2017	triples
Gold medal – first place	2016, 2023	pairs

Margaret Anwen Butten (born 29 August 1972) is a Welsh international bowls competitor for Wales.

== Bowls career ==
Butten was born in Carmarthen. She began playing bowls at the age of 13 after watching her mother play for the Welsh International team. Seeing her mother play inspired her to play.

At the 2002 Commonwealth Games, she won a bronze medal along with Joanna Weale in the women's pairs event. Butten competed at the 2006 Commonwealth Games in Melbourne but was unsuccessful in winning a medal.

In 2007, she won the triples silver medal at the Atlantic Bowls Championships and followed this with a fours gold medal in Johannesburg two years later (2009).

She then competed at the 2010 Commonwealth Games along with Hannah Smith in the women's pairs and won a bronze medal.

During the run up to the 2014 Commonwealth Games in Glasgow she was chosen for the Commonwealth Games Queen's Baton Relay in Carmarthen. The Baton carried a message from Queen Elizabeth II as Head of the Commonwealth. The Relay traditionally begins at Buckingham Palace in London as a part of the city's Commonwealth Day festivities. The Queen entrusts the baton to the first relay runner. At the Opening Ceremony of the Games, held at Glasgow's Celtic F.C. stadium, the final relay runner, Chris Hoy, handed the baton back to the Queen, who read the message aloud to officially open the Games.

She won another medal at the 2015 Atlantic Games before winning a silver medal with Kathy Pearce and Emma Woodcock in the triples at the 2016 World Outdoor Bowls Championship in Christchurch.

She was selected as part of the Welsh team for the 2018 Commonwealth Games on the Gold Coast in Queensland

In 2019, she won the fours gold medal at the Atlantic Bowls Championships and in 2020 she was selected for the 2020 World Outdoor Bowls Championship in Australia.

In 2022, she competed in the women's triples and the Women's fours at the 2022 Commonwealth Games. Butten won the pairs title at the 2023 Welsh National Bowls Championships, with her daughter Alis Butten (for the second time) but missed out on selection for the 2023 World Outdoor Bowls Championship. The pair then went on to win the win the pairs title at the 2024 British Isles Bowls Championships.
