= 2016 World Outdoor Bowls Championship =

World Championship bowls event

World Outdoor Championships 2016
- 13th World Outdoor Bowls Championships
- Location: Christchurch, New Zealand
- Date: 29 November – 11 December 2016.
- Category: World Bowls Championship

The 2016 World Outdoor Bowls Championship was held at the Burnside Bowling Club in Avonhead, Christchurch, New Zealand, from 29 November to 11 December 2016.

There were eight events that determined the 2016 world champions, the men's singles, doubles, triples and fours and the women's singles, doubles, triples and fours.

== Medallists ==
Event	Gold	Silver	Bronze	Bronze
Men's singles	(New Zealand); Shannon McIlroy	(Canada); Ryan Bester	(Scotland); Darren Burnett	(Australia); Aron Sherriff
Men's pairs	(Australia); Aaron Wilson; Brett Wilkie	Ireland; Gary Kelly; Ian McClure	(Scotland); Alex Marshall; Paul Foster	(New Zealand); Mike Kernaghan; Shannon McIlroy
Men's triples	(England); Andrew Knapper; Jamie Walker; Robert Paxton	(Australia); Aron Sherriff; Barrie Lester; Mark Casey	(Japan); Kenta Hasebe; Hisaharu Satoh; Kenichi Emura	(New Zealand); Blake Signal; Mike Nagy; Ali Forsyth
Men's fours	(New Zealand); Blake Signal; Mike Kernaghan; Mike Nagy; Ali Forsyth	(Australia); Aaron Wilson; Barrie Lester; Mark Casey; Brett Wilkie	Ireland; Martin McHugh; Neil Mulholland; Simon Martin; Ian McClure	(Scotland); Iain McLean; Paul Foster; Ronnie Duncan; Alex Marshall
Men's team	New Zealand	Australia	Scotland	N/A
Women's singles	(Australia); Karen Murphy	(Scotland); Lesley Doig	(Canada); Kelly McKerihen	(New Zealand); Jo Edwards
Women's pairs	(Wales); Laura Daniels; Jess Sims	(New Zealand); Angela Boyd; Jo Edwards	(Scotland); Lauren Baillie; Lesley Doig	(England); Sophie Tolchard; Ellen Falkner
Women's triples	(Australia); Natasha Scott; Rebecca Van Asch; Carla Krizanic	(Wales); Anwen Butten; Kathy Pearce; Emma Woodcock	(South Africa); Elma Davis; Susan Nel; Sylvia Burns	(Malaysia); Nor Hashimah Ismail; Nur Fidrah Noh; Azlina Arshad
Women's fours	(Australia); Natasha Scott; Rebecca Van Asch; Carla Krizanic; Kelsey Cottrell	(England); Rebecca Wigfield; Wendy King; Jamie-Lea Winch; Ellen Falkner	(Philippines); Hazel Jagonoy; Rosita Bradborn; Ronalyn Greenlees; Sonia Bruce	(New Zealand); Kirsten Edwards; Val Smith; Angela Boyd; Katelyn Inch
Women's team	Australia	Wales	New Zealand	N/A

== Results ==
=== Men's team (W.M.Leonard Trophy) ===
	Team	Singles	Pairs	Triples	Fours	Total
1	New Zealand	20+3	18+1	18+1	20+3	84
2	Australia	17+1	20+3	19+2	19+2	83
3	Scotland	18+1	17+1	16	17+1	71
4	Ireland	13	19+2	15	18+1	68
5	England	11	15	20+3	16	65
6	Wales	16	11	8	11	48
7	Malaysia	15	16	3	14	48
8	Canada	19+2	10	5	8	46
9	Jersey	10	12	11	10	43
10	United States	0	11	9	15	35
11	Spain	8	5	14	7	34
12	Japan	14	0	17+1	1	33
13	South Africa	5	8	7	13	33
14	Hong Kong	9	14	0	9	32
15	Zimbabwe	0	0	10	12	22
16	Brunei	7	0	12	2	21
17	Namibia	6	0	13	0	19
18	Norfolk Island	4	4	4	5	17
19	Fiji	0	6	6	4	16
20	India	12	2	0	0	14
21	Israel	0	7	0	6	13
22	Guernsey	3	9	0	0	12
23	Singapore	0	3	0	3	6
24	Cyprus	2	1	0	0	3
25	Samoa	0	0	2	0	2
26	(Macau) Macao	1	0	0	0	1
27	Niue	0	0	1	0	1

=== Women's team (Taylor Trophy) ===
	Team	Singles	Pairs	Triples	Fours	Total
1	Australia	20+3	16	20+3	20+3	85
2	Wales	14	20+3	19+2	15	73
3	New Zealand	17+1	19+2	14	18+1	72
4	Scotland	19+2	18+1	15	16	71
5	Malaysia	16	15	18+1	11	61
6	England	5	17+1	16	19+2	60
7	Philippines	13	14	10	17+1	55
8	South Africa	10	12	17+1	14	54
9	Canada	18+1	8	11	2	40
10	Norfolk Island	15	13	6	3	37
11	Ireland	11	10	4	12	37
12	United States	9	0	9	13	31
13	Hong Kong	0	5	12	9	26
14	Fiji	6	0	13	4	23
15	Netherlands	12	6	0	0	18
16	Spain	0	7	2	8	17
17	Brunei	8	0	8	0	16
18	Namibia	0	3	7	6	16
19	Cyprus	4	11	0	0	15
20	Israel	0	9	0	5	14
21	Japan	0	0	0	10	10
22	Zimbabwe	3	0	5	0	8
23	Singapore	0	1	0	7	8
24	Kenya	7		0	0	7
25	Cook Islands	2	4	0	0	6
26	China	0	2	3	0	5
27	Guernsey	1	0	0	0	1
28	Turkey	0	0	0	1	1
29	Isle of Man	0	0	1	0	1
