= New Zealand National Bowls Championships =

Lawn bowls event

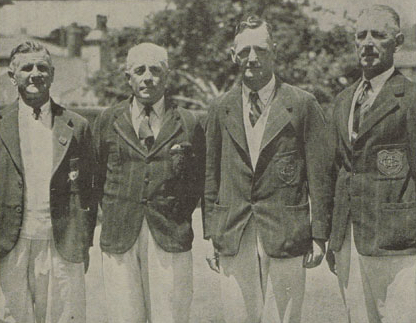
- Alex Robertson, Jack Macklow and Bill Whittaker and Frank Livingstone, 1940 fours winners

Tournament information
- Sport: Lawn bowls
- Location: New Zealand
- Established: 1914
- Website: Bowls New Zealand

The New Zealand National Bowls Championships is organised by Bowls New Zealand. Bowls was introduced in New Zealand in 1861 but the first national championships were not held until 1914.

== Men's singles ==
| Year | Champion | Ref |
|---|---|---|
| 1914 | John Kilgour (Carlton) | |
| 1915 | Max Walker (Ponsonby) | |
| 1916 | Edward Fountain (Roslyn) | |
| 1917 | Cyril Ingram (Wellington) | |
| 1918 | Walter Foster (Caledonian) | |
| 1919 | Max Walker (Ponsonby) | |
| 1920 | Ernest Harraway (Dunedin) | |
| 1921 | James Brackenbridge (Wellington) | |
| 1922 | James Rigby (North East Valley) | |
| 1923 | Max Walker (Ponsonby) | |
| 1924 | William Carswell (Taieri) | |
| 1925 | Jack Best (Dunedin) | |
| 1926 | Walter Foster (Caledonian) | |
| 1927 | Henry C Clarke (Rocky Nook) | |
| 1928 | John Scott (Caledonian) | |
| 1929 | Archibald R Coltman (Carlton) | |
| 1930 | Frank Lambeth (Balmacewen) | |
| 1931 | Norm Bell (Hamilton) | |
| 1932 | John Scott (Caledonian) | |
| 1933 | William M Parkhouse (Wellington) | |
| 1934 | William Carswell (Taieri) | |
| 1935 | Arthur Engebretsen (Napier) | |
| 1936 | Frank Livingstone (Onehunga) | |
| 1937 | Charlie Spearman (Sydenham) | |
| 1938 | William D Bennett (Hastings) | |
| 1939 | Wally Franks (Balmoral) | |
| 1940 | George A Deare (Carlton) | |
| 1941 | Charlie Spearman (Christchurch RSA) | |
| 1944 | Mort Squire (Hawera Tower) | |
| 1945 | Jim Martin (Carlton) | |
| 1946 | Jim Martin (Edgeware) | |
| 1947 | Steve Vella (Onehunga) | |
| 1948 | Sam Marriott (Opawa) | |
| 1949 | Stan Gooch (Kahutia) | |
| 1950 | Lew J Edwards (Balclutha) | |
| 1951 | Ron Graham (Johnsonville) | |
| 1952 | Frank Livingstone (Onehunga) | |
| 1953 | Roy McMaster (Stanley) | |
| 1954 | Robin Andrew (Onehunga) | |
| 1955 | Jack Rabone (Northern) | |
| 1956 | George Littlejohn (Hutt) | |
| 1957 | Ham Pirret (Tuakau) | |
| 1958 | Phil Skoglund (Northern) | |
| 1959 | Bill Fleming (Newtown) | |
| 1960 | Stan Snedden (Linwood) | |
| 1961 | Jack Rabone (Auckland) | |
| 1962 | Jeff Barron (Miramar) | |
| 1963 | Tony Govorko (Ngongotahā) | |
| 1964 | Ron Buchan (Tui Park) | |
| 1965 | Ron Buchan (Tui Park) | |
| 1966 | Phil Skoglund (Palmerston North) | |
| 1967 | Percy Jones (Otahuhu Railway) | |
| 1968 | Stan Lawson (Burwood) | |
| 1969 | Lionel Franks (Balmoral) | |
| 1970 | Phil Skoglund (Palmerston North) | |
| 1971 | Phil Skoglund (Northern) | |
| 1972 | Phil Skoglund (Northern) | |
| 1973 | Percy Jones (Otahuhu Railway) | |
| 1974 | Robbie Robson (Tokoroa) | |
| 1975 | Vic Sellars (Northern) | |
| 1976 | Ernie Wilson (Balmacewen) | |
| 1977 | Ivan Kostanich (Helensville) | |
| 1978 | John Malcolm (Carlton) | |
| 1979 | Nick Unkovich (Okahu Bay) | |
| 1980 | John Murtagh (Paritutu) | |
| 1981 | Peter Belliss (Aramoho) | |
| 1982 | Jim Scott (Johnsonville) | |
| 1983 | Danny O'Connor (Okahu Bay) | |
| 1984 | Robin Milne (Geraldine) | |
| 1985 | Ian Dickison (Kaikorai) | |
| 1986 | Peter Belliss (Aramoho) | |
| 1987 | Ken Walker (Fairfield) | |
| 1988 | Kevin Darling (Caversham) | |
| 1989 | Gary Lawson (Sydenham) | |
| 1990 | Terry Scott (North East Valley) | |
| 1991 | Petar Sain (Carlton) | |
| 1992 | Peter Belliss (Aramoho) | |
| 1993 | Ivan Kostanich (Carlton) | |
| 1994 | Gary Lawson (Carlton) | |
| 1995 | Brian Baldwin (Paritutu) | |
| 1996 | Nino Vlahovic (Carlton) | |
| 1997 | Peter Shaw (Northern) | |
| 1998 | Kelvin Scott (Belfast) | |
| 1999 | Justin Goodwin (Hillsboro) | |
| 2000 | Petar Sain (Carlton) | |
| 2001 | Mike Kernaghan (Kaikorai) | |
| 2002 | Mike Kernaghan (Kaikorai) | |
| 2003 | Ali Forsyth (United) | |
| 2004 | Ali Forsyth (United) | |
| 2005 | Dwayne Cameron (Homai) | |
| 2006 | Alan Dickson (Castlecliff) | |
| 2007 | Tony Grantham (Birkenhead) | |
| 2008 | Russell Meyer (Cabramatta) | |
| 2009 | Richard Collett (Papakura) | |
| 2010 | Andrew Todd (Burnside) | |
| 2011 | Shaun Scott (North East Valley) | |
| 2012 | Peter Hodson (Stoke) | |
| 2013 | Shaun Scott (North East Valley) | |
| 2014 | Ali Forsyth (Havelock) | |
| 2015 | Mike Kernaghan (Kaikorai) | |
| 2016 | Shannon McIlroy (Stoke) | |
| 2017 | Dean Elgar (West End) | |
| 2018 | Shannon McIlroy (Stoke) | |
| 2019 | Taylor Horn (Mangere) | |
| 2020 | Andrew Kelly (Canterbury 2017) | |
| 2021 | Mike Galloway (Royal Oak) | |
| 2022 | Kelvin Scott (Elmwood Park) | |
| 2023 | Sheldon Bagrie-Howley (Gore) | |
| 2024 | Aiden Takarua (Point Chevalier) | |
| 2025 | Matt Berry (Pringle Park) | |

== Men's pairs ==
| Year | Champions | Ref |
|---|---|---|
| 1914 | Ernest Harraway, J Johnson (Dunedin) | |
| 1915 | Alexander Smellie, George Blackwood (Green Island) | |
| 1916 | Charles Parata, V Dimock (Thorndon) | |
| 1917 | J J Martin, A Sawyer (Turanganui) | |
| 1918 | Ernest Harraway, W M Hogg (Dunedin) | |
| 1919 | W J Hueston, J B Rosemund (Gisborne) | |
| 1920 | W Spiller, J Turnbull (Sydenham) | |
| 1921 | S Potter, William Grenfell (Wellington) | |
| 1922 | James Brackenbridge Sr., James Brackenbridge Jr. (Newtown) | |
| 1923 | T Edwards, W McCallum (Temuka) | |
| 1924 | J A Redpath, Jas Angus (Canterbury) | |
| 1925 | James Sexton, Charlie Davis (Newtown) | |
| 1926 | E Tamblyn, W R Todd (St Kilda) | |
| 1927 | Max Walker, A Brakebush (Auckland) | |
| 1928 | G Logan, D Dunphy (Maitai) | |
| 1929 | F Laurenson, A G Kinvig (Linwood) | |
| 1930 | H Jenkin, G L Gladding (Carlton) | |
| 1931 | R N Pilkington, H G Loveridge (Hamilton) | |
| 1932 | C E Hardley, Bill Bremner (West End Auckland) | |
| 1933 | Mort Squire, Harry Maslin (Hawera Tower) | |
| 1934 | J A Veitch, J McPherson (West Harbour) | |
| 1935 | R N Pilkington, H G Loveridge (Hamilton) | |
| 1936 | H Haworth, J W Turpin (Canterbury) | |
| 1937 | Jack Lowry, D Hunter (Petone) | |
| 1938 | C E Tyrrell, R B Clarke (Roslyn) | |
| 1939 | W J Robinson, J S Anchor (Hamilton) | |
| 1940 | Bill Bremner, L G Donaldson (West End Auckland) | |
| 1941 | Mort Squire, Harry Maslin (Hawera Tower) | |
| 1944 | E W Travers, P H Edwards (St Kilda) | |
| 1945 | L Russell, J W Darroch (St Heliers) | |
| 1946 | S C K Smith, G C Batchelor (Northend) | |
| 1947 | Phil Exelby, Rance Hawkins (Frankton) | |
| 1948 | S Garelja, M A Marinovich (Oratia) | |
| 1949 | J G Mingins, Frank Livingstone (Onehunga) | |
| 1950 | E H Elwood, A Hirst (Christchurch RSA) | |
| 1951 | Arthur Webster, George Littlejohn (Hutt) | |
| 1952 | Life Ravenwood, R K Aitchison (North East Valley) | |
| 1953 | Ted Pilkington, J F Benson (Balmoral) | |
| 1954 | Charlie Spearman, N A McNab (Christchurch RSA) | |
| 1955 | Mate Borich, Rance Hawkins (Hamilton) | |
| 1956 | Life Ravenwood, L J Hughes (North East Valley) | |
| 1957 | Lionel Franks, H Franks (Balmoral) | |
| 1958 | Ham Pirret, C J Rogers (Tuakau) | |
| 1959 | Hec Thompson, Gordon Bradley (Whitiora) | |
| 1960 | Pete Skoglund, Eddie Taylor (Carlton) | |
| 1961 | M Vulinovich, N Posa (Oratia) | |
| 1962 | Bob McDonald, Frank Livingstone (Onehunga) | |
| 1963 | John Flett, Selwyn Jolly (Pt Chevalier) | |
| 1964 | G P Ogilvie, Bill Scott (Cromwell) | |
| 1965 | Ces McGarry, Norm Lash (Carlton) | |
| 1966 | E W Grimman, Ernie M Wilson (Caversham) | |
| 1967 | Percy Jones, D Miller (Otahuhu Railway) | |
| 1968 | Hugh Hogg, A F Rawlinson (St Clair) | |
| 1969 | Percy Jones, D Miller (Otahuhu Railway) | |
| 1970 | Wally Wilkinson, H Hartley (St Albans Merivale) | |
| 1971 | Dave Baldwin, John Murtagh (Paritutu) | |
| 1972 | Phil Skoglund, Vic Sellars (Northern) | |
| 1973 | Kevin Darling, R E Dunne (Balmacewen) | |
| 1974 | Kevin Darling, Ernie Wilson (Balmacewen) | |
| 1975 | Dave Kydd, C W Franks (Eastbourne) | |
| 1976 | Phil Skoglund, Mario Basile (Northern) | |
| 1977 | Norm Lash, Ted Quinn (Hutt) | |
| 1978 | George Alley, Cliff Pryce-Jones (Mt Wellington) | |
| 1979 | Bill MacArthur, Vern Muir (Paritutu) | |
| 1980 | Dave Burgess, Colin Galt (Te Rangi) | |
| 1981 | Ian Dickison, Phil Dickison (Kaikorai) | |
| 1982 | Danny O'Connor, Rowan Brassey (Okahu Bay) | |
| 1983 | Alan Crow (New Plymouth RSA), Bruce Johns (Paritutu) | |
| 1984 | Ivan Kostanich, Pat Robertson (Helensville) | |
| 1985 | Maurice Symes, Geoff Hawken (Hawera Park) | |
| 1986 | Les Morrison, Winston McLachlan (Clinton) | |
| 1987 | Peter Clark (Whakatane), Don McKillop (Opotiki) | |
| 1988 | Jack Dale, Bruce McGowan (Papanui) | |
| 1989 | Dave Blanche, Jim Vevers (Paraparaumu Beach) | |
| 1990 | Bruce Malcolm, Gordon Duggie (Port Chalmers) | |
| 1991 | Nick Unkovich, Ross Haresnape (Rawhiti) | |
| 1992 | Peter Belliss (Aramoho), Robin Jefferson (Poverty Bay) | |
| 1993 | Sid Giddy (Mt Maunganui), Kevin Asplin (Arawa) | |
| 1994 | Bruce McNish, Stewart Buttar (Burnside) | |
| 1995 | Peter Belliss (Aramoho), Lance Tasker (Castlecliff) | |
| 1996 | Brian Baldwin, Gary Mounsey (Paritutu) | |
| 1997 | Gary Lawson (Belfast), Andrew Curtain (Elmwood) | |
| 1998 | Peter Shaw, Russell Meyer (Northern) | |
| 1999 | Phil Skoglund, Raymond Skoglund (Northern) | |
| 2000 | Chris Waterson (Wanganui), Sean Johnson (Aramoho) | |
| 2001 | Mike Galloway, David Clark (Pakuranga) | |
| 2002 | Brendon Gibson, Grant Wakefield (Johnsonville) | |
| 2003 | Vladimir Marsic, Petar Sain (Carlton) | |
| 2004 | Mike Small, Kevin Gore (Burnside) | |
| 2005 | Kevin Robinson (Tokoroa), Stephen Posa (Takapuna) | |
| 2006 | Rex Holmes, Brian Howman (Paraparaumu Beach) | |
| 2007 | Mike Kernaghan (Onehunga), David Archer (Taieri) | |
| 2008 | Gary Lawson, Andrew Curtain (Eastbourne) | |
| 2009 | Rob Ashton (Johnsonville), Ray Boffa (Paraparaumu Beach) | |
| 2010 | Gary Lawson (Eastbourne), Dan Delany (Onehunga) | |
| 2011 | Ryan Bester (Cabramatta), Chris Le Lievre (Onehunga) | |
| 2012 | Blake Signal (Stokes Valley), Alvin Gardiner (Elmwood) | |
| 2013 | Ali Forsyth (Havelock), Matt Gallop (Blenheim) | |
| 2014 | Tony Grantham (Birkenhead), Mike Nagy (Taren Point) | |
| 2015 | Rob Ashton, Petar Sain (Carlton Cornwall) | |
| 2016 | Ali Forsyth (Nelson), Neville Forsyth (Stoke) | |
| 2017 | Gary Lawson (Sumner), Neville Rodda (Victoria) | |
| 2018 | Ali Forsyth (Clayton), Gary Lawson (Eastbourne) | |
| 2019 | Jordan King, Chris Lowe (Mangere) | |
| 2020 | Raymond Martin (Victoria), Robbie Bennett (Titahi Bay) | |
| 2021 | Lance Pascoe (Elmwood Park), Jamie Hill (Mt Albert) | |
| 2022 | Andrew Kelly (Canterbury 2017), Seamus Curtin (Stokes Valley) | |
| 2023 | Gary Lawson, Tony Grantham (Mt Albert) | |
| 2024 | Gary Lawson, Tony Grantham (Mt Albert) | |
| 2025 | Lance Pascoe (Elmwood Park), Jamie Hill (Mt Albert) | |

== Men's fours ==
| Year | Champions | Ref |
|---|---|---|
| 1914 | J Porteous, W J Thompson, A E Erskine, William Grenfell (Wellington) | |
| 1915 | Jimmy Nash, Frederick Tasker, Sydney Dixon, Norman Nash (Palmerston North) | |
| 1916 | J Laughton, A B Duff, A E Davies, Charlie Davis (Newtown) | |
| 1917 | G B Osmond, W Coltman, Archibald Coltman, J S Ryrie (Auckland) | |
| 1918 | C R Smith, E T G Falconer, J Spinks, W Robson (Otago) | |
| 1919 | Ernie Jury, O Gallagher, W Given, A J Andrew (Karangahake) | |
| 1920 | A P London, H N Tiley, F L Anderson, H Brookfield (Wanganui) | |
| 1921 | Ernie Jury, O Gallagher, Andy Bell, B Hilton (Karangahake) | |
| 1922 | William Carswell, W Allan, W B Allan, J A McKinnon (Taieri) | |
| 1923 | A Parsons, V P Casey, J F Hosking, R S Sommervell (Ponsonby) | |
| 1924 | Bill Bremner, C G Maher, H S Hill, W Ure (West End Auckland) | |
| 1925 | R N Pilkington, Arthur McIntyre, F T Wilson, J J Wernham (Hamilton) | |
| 1926 | Ernest Harraway, F McCullough, H G Sledeberg, Jack Best (Dunedin) | |
| 1927 | A H Benefield, J F Wright, H Rowling, J McMillan (St Johns Hill) | |
| 1928 | Walter Foster, D Hutchison, V Langley, F Kettle (Caledonian) | |
| 1929 | Bill Bremner, I Clarke, F Needham, C E Hardley (West End Auckland) | |
| 1930 | D M Stuart, J Dowland, L C Buist, E S Wilson (St Kilda) | |
| 1931 | George A Deare, H Gardiner, A J H Gregory, Jack Best (Dunedin) | |
| 1932 | Max Walker, C H De Launay, Len Keys, K S Macky (Auckland) | |
| 1933 | L M Taylor, James Brackenbridge, R McKenzie, Arthur Hastings (Lyall Bay) | |
| 1934 | Harry Wilson, H F Gibson, F Redpath, G Dickson (Linwood) | |
| 1935 | H Whittle, W J Liversidge, L G Donaldson, W E Mincham (Grey Lynn) | |
| 1936 | R Haworth, C J Shaw, J W Turpin, C H Elsom (Canterbury) | |
| 1937 | R Haworth, C J Shaw, P Munn, C H Elsom (Canterbury) | |
| 1938 | Harry Wilson, P Munn, F Redpath, Stan Snedden (Linwood) | |
| 1939 | Wally Franks, J F Benson, H Franks, C F Robertson (Balmoral) | |
| 1940 | Frank Livingstone, Alex Robertson, Jack Macklow, Bill Whittaker (Onehunga) | |
| 1941 | P Munn, A Williamson, D H Joseph, C H Elsom (Canterbury) | |
| 1944 | Charlie Spearman, J A Whyte, A E Seymour, W J Chapman (Christchurch RSA) | |
| 1945 | Arthur Engebretsen, J A Maher, H Berry, J Franklin (Heretaunga) | |
| 1946 | F White, J Armstrong, J Gourley, W Hillhouse (Runanga) | |
| 1947 | Geoff Crowley, Vic Hurlstone, L S Crowley, Bill Crowley (Tolaga Bay) | |
| 1948 | J H Mingins, Alex Robertson, Frank Livingstone, Jack Macklow (Onehunga) | |
| 1949 | Pete Skoglund, Alby Rivers, Link Rule, Bert Murdoch (Otahuhu) | |
| 1950 | Geoff Crowley, Vic Hurlstone, J H Meikle, Bill Crowley (Tolaga Bay) | |
| 1951 | Pete Skoglund, Alby Rivers, Link Rule, Bert Murdoch (Otahuhu) | |
| 1952 | K S Ewing, Mort Squire, W J Ashton, N M Johnston (Stratford) | |
| 1953 | N Orange, N A Fletcher, C B Shine, W G Thornally (Balmoral) | |
| 1954 | Pete Skoglund, Bill O'Neill, Link Rule, J Rothwell (Otahuhu) | |
| 1955 | I B Evans, A Robinson, E A Horan, J Whitehead (Omarunui) | |
| 1956 | Robbie Robson, L J Buckingham, C E Tomlinson, P C F Barrat (Mangakino) | |
| 1957 | Ron Buchan, A N Callaghan, Wally Wearne, F M Murray (Tui Park) | |
| 1958 | Pete Skoglund, Arthur Connew, L G Donaldson, W H Woods (Carlton) | |
| 1959 | M A Marinovich, A Sunde, C Hill, T Sunde (Oratia) | |
| 1960 | Bill O'Neill, B G Moore, J D Scott, H Roy (Carlton) | |
| 1961 | Mort Squire, R S Eves, L N Harris, J Hammersley (West End) | |
| 1962 | R Brown, H W Todd, S Barlow, W Humphreys (Marlborough) | |
| 1963 | Bill O'Neill, J Coltman, Norm Lash, J D Scott (Carlton) | |
| 1964 | H Deavoll, R D Barron, J M Clarke, C T Bateman (Sydenham) | |
| 1965 | Percy Jones, A Cotton, G Macrae, D Miller (Otahuhu Railway) | |
| 1966 | A J Rudduck, R Keen, R W M Anderson, T McGimpsey (Meadowbank) | |
| 1967 | H E Fayen, J H Fowler, J E Ord, Howard Bogun (Taumarunui) | |
| 1968 | Mattie Connew, R L Park, R G Park, J Morron (Carlton) | |
| 1969 | D Milat, T Radich, D F Borrie, T Miosich (Ellerslie) | |
| 1970 | Gordon Jolly, John W Walls, A J Robinson, Peter Jolly (Leith) | |
| 1971 | John Somerville, Nick Unkovich, Sid Downie, Morrie Davis (Rewa) | |
| 1972 | Ken Tompkins, Dave Baldwin, Bruce Johns, John Murtagh (Paritutu) | |
| 1973 | Bob McDonald, C W Smith, Morrie Davis, N Church (Onehunga) | |
| 1974 | Ken Murtagh, Dave Baldwin, Bruce Ballinger, John Murtagh (Paritutu) | |
| 1975 | Nick Unkovich, Danny O'Connor, Doug Richards-Jolley, Des Craig (Okahu Bay) | |
| 1976 | Phil Skoglund, Wally Hobbs, Mario Basile, George McKenzie (Northern) | |
| 1977 | Kerry Clark, N Kroon, Terry Scott, C Hutchison (North East Valley) | |
| 1978 | Morgan Moffat, B J Smith, L G Calder, Ken Watson (Linwood) | |
| 1979 | Nick Unkovich, Danny O'Connor, Doug Richards-Jolley, Des Craig (Okahu Bay) | |
| 1980 | Jim Scott, Cliff Taylor, Kevin Harmon, Rex Knox (Johnsonville) | |
| 1981 | Nick Unkovich, Danny O'Connor, Doug Richards-Jolley, Rowan Brassey (Okahu Bay) | |
| 1982 | Nick Unkovich, Danny O'Connor, Doug Richards-Jolley, Rowan Brassey (Okahu Bay) | |
| 1983 | Bruce McNish (Milton), Ken Walker (Fairfield), Les Burnard (Fairfield), Ray Hunt (Balclutha) | |
| 1984 | Nick Unkovich (Rawhiti), Ivan Marsic (Carlton), Bert Robinson (Hillsboro), George Alley (Mt Wellington) | |
| 1985 | Nick Unkovich (Rawhiti), John Somerville (Rewa), Lou Musin (Rawhiti), Chris Tracey (Rawhiti) | |
| 1986 | Nick Unkovich (Rawhiti), John Somerville (Rewa), Lou Musin (Rawhiti), Chris Tracey (Rawhiti) | |
| 1987 | Mick Heald, Harold Greenfield, Graeme Clifford, John Aplin (Naenae) | |
| 1988 | Peter Meier (South Brighton), Bruce McNish (Spreydon), Russell Good (South Brighton), Roger Glendinning (South Brighton) | |
| 1989 | Brian Barker (Papanui), Pat Doig (Papanui), Dave Trainor (Wilton), Warner Barber (Papanui) | |
| 1990 | Rowan Brassey, Danny O'Connor, Peter Thorne, Barry Greer (Okahu Bay) | |
| 1991 | Sid Giddy (Arawa), Mike Martinovich (Pukekohe), Doug Kent (Papakura), Kevin Asplin (Arawa) | |
| 1992 | Nick Grgicevich (Hillsboro), Ivan Marsic (Carlton), Vladimir Marsic (Carlton), Mike Martinovich (Pukekohe) | |
| 1993 | Gary Lawson (Carlton), Bruce McNish (Greymouth), Andrew Curtain (Linwood), Stewart Buttar (Burnside) | |
| 1994 | Gary Lawson (Carlton), Bruce McNish (Burnside), Andrew Curtain (Linwood), Stewart Buttar (Burnside) | |
| 1995 | Rowan Brassey, Danny O'Connor, Peter Thorne, Ross Haresnape (Okahu Bay) | |
| 1996 | Gary Lawson (Victoria), Peter Shaw (Palmerston North), Mike Solomon (Victoria), Andrew Curtain (Elmwood) | |
| 1997 | Gary Lawson (Belfast), Peter Shaw (Northern), Mike Solomon (Victoria, Andrew Curtain (Elmwood) | |
| 1998 | Andrew Smith (Havelock), Lloyd Gallop (Blenheim), Kevin Greenwood (Havelock), Bob Dowling (Havelock) | |
| 1999 | Petar Sain, Nick Krajancic, Ivan Zonich, Alf Dickens (Carlton) | |
| 2000 | Sid Giddy, Maurice Hickey, Kevin Maxfield, Lance Tasker (Mt Maunganui) | |
| 2001 | Sid Giddy, Maurice Hickey, Kevin Maxfield, Lance Tasker (Mt Maunganui) | |
| 2002 | Rowan Brassey (Avondale), Jamie Hill (Avondale), Kerry Chapman (Henderson), Ross Haresnape (Avondale) | |
| 2003 | Rowan Brassey, Jamie Hill, Mike Reid, Ross Haresnape (Avondale) | |
| 2004 | Gary Lawson (Hornby Domain), Glenn McDonald (Riccarton Racecourse), Andrew Curtain (Elmwood), Adam Newman (Victoria) | |
| 2005 | Richard Girvan (Taren Point), Danny O'Connor (Okahu Bay), Wayne Turley (Taren Point), Steve Beel (North East Valley) | |
| 2006 | Dwayne Cameron (Manurewa Cosmopolitan), Shannon McIlroy (Te Karaka), Shane McGonagle (Hunua), Ross Thorn (Naenae) | |
| 2007 | Sean O'Neill (Kia Toa Timaru), Dave Hanson (Kia Toa Timaru), Rod Dorgan (Kia Toa Timaru), Barrie Andrews (West End Timaru) | |
| 2008 | Ryan Bester (Hanover), Bruce McNish (Musgrave Hill), Chris Le Lievre (Onehunga), Nick Buttar (Burnside) | |
| 2009 | Peter Belliss (Cabramatta), Kevin Robinson (Putaruru), Stephen Posa (Frankton Railway), Justin Goodwin (Eastbourne) | |
| 2010 | Alvin Gardiner (Elmwood), Blake Signal (Stokes Valley), Robbie Bennett (Johnsonville), Clint Carroll (Stokes Valley) | |
| 2011 | Ali Forsyth (Taren Point), Matt Gallop (Cabramatta), Lloyd Gallop (Blenheim), Graham Hood (Havelock) | |
| 2012 | Andrew Kelly (Canterbury), Ali Forsyth (Havelock), Blake Signal (Stokes Valley), Greg Ruaporo (Hillsboro) | |
| 2013 | Rowan Brassey (Cabramatta), Beau Prideaux (Cabramatta), Rodger Hassall (Paritutu), Brett Hassall (Avondale) | |
| 2014 | Mike Kernaghan (Kaikorai), Andrew Kelly (Redcliffs Mt Pleasant), Tony Grantham (Birkenhead), Mike Nagy (Taren Point) | |
| 2015 | Peter Belliss (Aramoho), Richard Girvan (Onehunga), Lance Tasker (Tauranga), Danny O'Connor (Birkenhead) | |
| 2016 | Kerry Becks (Kaiapoi Club), Darren Redway (Papanui), Paddy Stewart (Kaiapoi Club), Tony Andrews (Kaiapoi Club) | |
| 2017 | Peter Belliss (Aramoho), Richard Girvan (Onehunga), Blake Signal (Stokes Valley), Lance Tasker (Tauranga) | |
| 2018 | Ali Forsyth (Clayton), Gary Lawson (Eastbourne), Shannon McIlroy (Stoke), Justin Goodwin (Eastbourne) | |
| 2019 | Dean Elgar (West End), Bruce Hall (West End), Neil Candy (West End), Gavin Scrivener (Aramoho) | |
| 2020 | Gary Lawson (Elmwood Park), Jamie Hill (Mt Albert), Caleb Hope (Gore), Sheldon Bagrie-Howley (Gore) | |
| 2021 | Maurice Symes (Blenheim), John Gray (Mount and Te Puke), Craig MacDonell (Blenheim), Steve Beel (Mount Maunganui) | |
| 2022 | Cancelled due to the COVID-19 pandemic | |
| 2023 | Rodney Greaney (Halswell), Paul Matheson (Halswell), Adrian Robins (Waimate), Kevan Greenwood (Renwick) | |
| 2024 | Mike Galloway, Martin Dixon, Steve Fisher (Royal Oak), David Clark (Manurewa) | |
| 2025 | Mike Galloway, Martin Dixon, Steve Fisher (Royal Oak), David Clark (Manurewa) | |

== Women's singles ==
| Year | Champion | Ref |
|---|---|---|
| 1957 | Ella McGuiness (Manurewa) | |
| 1958 | Alma Hamblyn (Riverside) | |
| 1959 | Jean Sangwell (Riverside) | |
| 1960 | Myrtle Nichol (Marewa) | |
| 1961 | Marjorie Butts (Canterbury RSA) | |
| 1962 | Audrey Russell (Marsden) | |
| 1963 | Ruth MacLachlan (Riverton) | |
| 1964 | Hazel Harper (Buckland) | |
| 1965 | Cis Winstanley (Marewa) | |
| 1966 | Elsie Wilkie (Walton) | |
| 1967 | Lenore McKenzie (Woolston) | |
| 1968 | Cis Winstanley (Marewa) | |
| 1969 | Thelma Harris (Lower Hutt) | |
| 1970 | Elsie Wilkie (Walton) | |
| 1971 | Elsie Wilkie (Walton) | |
| 1972 | Joyce Osborne (Manawatu) | |
| 1973 | Cis Winstanley (Marewa) | |
| 1975 | Altha Triggs (Caversham) | |
| 1976 | Alice Shaw (Otahuhu) | |
| 1977 | Noeleen Scott (Cromwell) | |
| 1978 | Barbara Kunicich (Bayswater) | |
| 1979 | Pearl Dymond (Stratford) | |
| 1980 | Rhoda Ryan (Matamata) | |
| 1981 | Barbara Kunicich (Bayswater) | |
| 1982 | Verna Devlin (Herne Bay) | |
| 1983 | Joyce Osborne (Manawatu) | |
| 1984 | Daphne Le Breton (Upper Hutt) | |
| 1985 | Olive Campbell (Balmacewen) | |
| 1986 | Vera Bindon (Rocky Nook) | |
| 1987 | Jean Foreman (Spreydon) | |
| 1988 | Judy Howat (Wellington) | |
| 1989 | Millie Khan (Matamata) | |
| 1990 | Millie Khan (Matamata) | |
| 1991 | Gladys Jellyman (Wakefield) | |
| 1992 | Millie Khan (Matamata) | |
| 1993 | Jean Cooper (Onehunga) | |
| 1994 | Arabia Kemp (Castlecliff) | |
| 1995 | Daphney Hugo (Woolston Park) | |
| 1996 | Marie Watson (Linwood) | |
| 1997 | Marie Watson (Linwood) | |
| 1998 | Eryn Brightwell (West End) | |
| 1999 | Marie Watson (Stoke) | |
| 2000 | Millie Khan (Matamata) | |
| 2001 | Dot Curry (Stadium) | |
| 2002 | Sharon Sims (Northern) | |
| 2003 | Marie Watson (United) | |
| 2004 | Shona Klimeck (Hokonui) | |
| 2005 | Sharon Sims (Northern) | |
| 2006 | Audrey Stevenson (Raumati South) | |
| 2007 | Nur Fidrah Noh (Malaysia) | |
| 2008 | Siti Zalina Ahmad (Malaysia) | |
| 2009 | Sue Wightman (Hakaru) | |
| 2010 | Jan Khan (Beckenham) | |
| 2011 | Jo Edwards (Burnside) | |
| 2012 | Sandra Keith (Leeston) | |
| 2013 | Val McEldowney (New Plymouth) | |
| 2014 | Helen King (Victoria) | |
| 2015 | Leigh Griffin (Victoria) | |
| 2016 | Kelsey Cottrell (St Johns Park) | |
| 2017 | Selina Goddard (Carlton Cornwall) | |
| 2018 | Jo Edwards (Pine Rivers) | |
| 2019 | Debbie White (Hinuera) | |
| 2020 | Katelyn Inch (Broadbeach, Aus) | |
| 2021 | Nicole Toomey (Victoria) | |
| 2022 | Tayla Bruce (Burnside) | |
| 2023 | Selina Goddard (Takapuna) | |
| 2024 | Leeane Poulson (Papakura) | |
| 2025 | Debbie White (Hinuera) | |

== Women's pairs ==
| Year | Champions | Ref |
|---|---|---|
| 1952 | Addess, Higginson (St Kilda) | |
| 1953 | G McGehan, Meredith (Auckland) | |
| 1954 | R Castel, Campbell (Alexandra) | |
| 1955 | Trix Tricker, L Shephard-Wilson (Lower Hutt) | |
| 1956 | A Swanson, M Harris (Kew) | |
| 1957 | Myrtle Nichol, Cis Winstanley (Marewa) | |
| 1958 | Myrtle Nichol, Cis Winstanley (Marewa) | |
| 1959 | Myrtle Nichol, Cis Winstanley (Marewa) | |
| 1960 | O Carey, A McIvor (Miramar) | |
| 1961 | E Edyvean, M Smith (Richmond) | |
| 1962 | E Hughes, V D'Arth (Hawera Tower) | |
| 1963 | Ivy Opie, Iris George (Hawera Tower) | |
| 1964 | V Wald, P Lockwood (Te Papapa) | |
| 1965 | Cis Winstanley, Eileen Bardell (Marewa) | |
| 1966 | Jean Ryan, R Chaafe (Roskill) | |
| 1967 | Joan Porter, Jean Coulson (Central) | |
| 1968 | Dot Pierson, Doris Thomson (Marewa) | |
| 1969 | Elsie Wilkie, Joan McLean (Walton) | |
| 1970 | Jean Ryan, R Chaafe (Onehunga) | |
| 1971 | Verna Devlin, J Clifford (Herne Bay) | |
| 1972 | Thelma Bainbridge, E Moore (Rocky Nook) | |
| 1973 | Rhoda Ryan, W Guy (Waharoa) | |
| 1974 | Barbara Kunicich, L Hunt (Bayswater) | |
| 1975 | N Baker, E Potter (Auckland) | |
| 1976 | V Beeston, N Calder (Te Puke) | |
| 1977 | Betty Fitzell, Joyce Hawtin (Matamata) | |
| 1978 | Altha Triggs, M Fisher (Caversham) | |
| 1979 | A Beazley, T Anderson (Linwood) | |
| 1980 | Elsie Wilkie, Zelda Clements (Matamata) | |
| 1981 | Margaret Walker, Delza Lowry (Lower Hutt) | |
| 1982 | Alice Shaw, Roz Windle (Papatoetoe) | |
| 1983 | Joan Porter, Jean Coulson (Central) | |
| 1984 | Cis Winstanley, Audrey Shuker (Marewa) | |
| 1985 | Thelma Kidd, Vi Fox (Matamata) | |
| 1986 | Evelyn Baker, Kath Campbell (Arawa) | |
| 1987 | Denise Page, Marie Watson (Linwood) | |
| 1988 | Rhoda Ryan, Adrienne Lambert (Matamata) | |
| 1989 | Catherine Bond, Nola Fitzsimmons (Omarunui) | |
| 1990 | Lenore Webber, Joy Deuchrass (Fairfield) | |
| 1991 | Altha Triggs, Noeleen Southen (Riccarton) | |
| 1992 | Bev Green, Norma Gallagher (Mt Maunganui) | |
| 1993 | Sharon Sims, Bev Budd (Manawatu) | |
| 1994 | Millie Khan, Gay Holmes (Matamata) | |
| 1995 | Karin Ware, Elaine Murdoch (Linwood) | |
| 1996 | Jocelyn Wallace, Val Johnston (Hillcrest) | |
| 1997 | Leigh Pettersen, Rae Mander (Tauranga Domain) | |
| 1998 | Eileen Powdrill, Gay Thompson (Kamo) | |
| 1999 | Judy Howat, Barbara Herrett (Wellington) | |
| 2000 | Millie Khan, Marina Khan (Matamata) | |
| 2001 | Marlene Castle (Orewa), Paulette Mytton (Browns Bay) | |
| 2002 | Jenny Flemming (Motueka), Sandra Robertson (Picton) | |
| 2003 | Norma Stewart, Janis Scott (New Lynn) | |
| 2004 | Jo Edwards, Val Smith (United) | |
| 2005 | Anne Bateman, Janice McLean (Kensington) | |
| 2006 | Sharon Sims (Northern), Mary Campbell (Taupo) | |
| 2007 | Sharon Sims (Northern), Mary Campbell (Taupo) | |
| 2008 | Jo Babich, Bev Crowe (Carlton Cornwall) | |
| 2009 | Sharon Sims (Northern), Mary Campbell (Tauranga South) | |
| 2010 | Reen Stratford (New Lynn), Bev Crowe (Carlton Cornwall) | |
| 2011 | Jo Edwards (Burnside), Val Smith (United) | |
| 2012 | Genevieve Baildon (Hillcrest), Jan Shirley (Canterbury) | |
| 2013 | Sandra Keith, Serena Matthews (Dunsandel) | |
| 2014 | Ann Muir (Kensington), Carolyn Crawford (St Clair) | |
| 2015 | Mandy Boyd, Angela Boyd (Burnside) | |
| 2016 | Mandy Boyd, Angela Boyd (Burnside) | |
| 2017 | Dale Rayner (Johnsonville), Ashleigh Jeffcoat (Frankton Junction) | |
| 2018 | Bev Morel, Sherrie Cottle (Elmwood Park) | |
| 2019 | Val Smith (United), Lisa Prideaux (Merrylands) | |
| 2020 | Katelyn Inch, Selina Goddard (composite) | |
| 2021 | Val Smith (United), Lisa Prideaux (Merrylands) | |
| 2022 | Sandra Keith (Allenton), Bev Morel (Elmwood Park) | |
| 2023 | Clare Hendra (Silverstream), Tayla Bruce (Burnside) | |
| 2024 | Jan Shirley (Elmwood), Kelly McKerihen (Clayton) | |
| 2025 | Olivia Bloomfield (New Lynn), Lisa Prideaux (Auckland) | |

== Women's fours ==
| Year | Champions | Ref |
|---|---|---|
| 1951 | Nellie Dennison, Constance Joyce, J Johnson, Lillian Tinney (Wanganui) | |
| 1952 | Violet Millett, Florence Bates, Ivy Fitzmorris, Nellie Bennett (Parnell) | |
| 1953 | Molly Moncur, Emma Linnell, Maheno Cochram, Ella Buchingham (Hawera Tower) | |
| 1954 | Hazel Shaw, Doris Kirkham, Elizabeth Turnbull, Bernice O'Hara (Otahuhu) | |
| 1955 | Ruby May, Ina Harris, Ivy Ballin, E Palmer (Riverside) | |
| 1956 | Isabella Swanson, Muriel Harris, Polly Crane, Hazel Whelan (Kew) | |
| 1957 | Lorraine Fowler, Anne Lloyd, Rhoda Greenwood, M Irving (Herne Bay) | |
| 1958 | Myrtle Nichol, Dot Pierson, Peg Forward, Cis Winstanley (Marewa) | |
| 1959 | Myrtle Nichol, Cis Winstanley, Dot Pierson, Peg Forward (Marewa) | |
| 1960 | Lyla Maule, L Anderson, Patricia Clarkson, Lorna Rogers (Patea) | |
| 1961 | Myrtle Nichol, Cis Winstanley, Dot Pierson, Peg Forward (Marewa) | |
| 1962 | Trix Tricker, F Murray, J Williams, Phil Simpson (Lower Hutt) | |
| 1963 | Cis Winstanley, Dot Pierson, Eileen Bardell, Doris Thomson (Marewa) | |
| 1964 | Ivy Opie, Iris George, J Mitchell, Edna Hughes (Hawera Tower) | |
| 1965 | Gwen Smith, Celia Chapple, A Scott, Ethel Hopkins (Kaiapoi) | |
| 1966 | Mary Raine, Aileen Gordon, Beth Percy, Elizabeth Richardson (Wanganui) | |
| 1967 | Thelma Bates, Betty Fitzell, M Price, Zelda Clements (Matamata) | |
| 1968 | Cis Winstanley, Dot Pierson, Peg Forward, Doris Thomson (Marewa) | |
| 1969 | Elsie Silvester, May Howie, Janet Whaler, Eunice Lister (Shirley) | |
| 1970 | Katheen Broderick, Vera Clayton, Gwyneth Lodge, Nancy Inwood (Beerescourt) | |
| 1971 | Zelda Smith, Iris McKeaman, J Keith, M Johnston (Huntly) | |
| 1972 | Elizabeth Potter, Nell Baker, Jan Jones, Jean Lash (Auckland) | |
| 1973 | Barbara Kunicich, Laura Hunt, Iris McIntyre, Nada Donaldson (Bayswater) | |
| 1974 | Joan Moody, Ethel Mason, Joyce Welsh, Ann Cleghorn (Northern) | |
| 1975 | Alice Whiting, Jean Johnston, Joy Hobson, Linda Mitchell (Woolston WMC) | |
| 1976 | Margret Hopkins, Eunice Stitt, Joyce Vasey, Rene Milne (Papatoetoe) | |
| 1977 | Cis Winstanley, Dot Pierson, Peg Forward, Doris Thomson (Marewa) | |
| 1978 | Cis Winstanley, Dot Pierson, Peg Forward, Doris Thomson (Marewa) | |
| 1979 | Nora Campi, Win Mackenzie, Katie Hooper, Kath Pomery (Kamo) | |
| 1980 | Alice Chalklen, Joyce Else, Sylvia Denton, Joyce Phair (Avondale) | |
| 1981 | Rhoda Ryan, Adrienne Lambert, Betty Schwass, Islay Garland (Matamata) | |
| 1982 | Flora McKinnon, Thelma Snell, Iris Parkes, Edna Forde (Whangarei) | |
| 1983 | Jean Ryan, Jean Cooper, Patricia Brown, Shirley Brown (Onehunga) | |
| 1984 | Jean Ryan, Nan Keating, Nita Rennison, Patricia Brown (Onehunga) | |
| 1985 | Thelma Kidd, Vi Fox, Gladys Moore, Mavis Buchanan (Matamata) | |
| 1986 | Maida Russ, Rona Carver, Elsie Martin, Dulcie Francis (Kihikihi) | |
| 1987 | Jennie Simpson, Betty Fitzell, Betty Schwass, Annette Bell (Matamata) | |
| 1988 | Thelma Kidd, Vi Fox, Gladys Moore, Mavis Buchanan (Matamata) | |
| 1989 | Rhoda Ryan, Adrienne Lambert, Zelda Clements, Millie Khan (Matamata) | |
| 1990 | Rhoda Ryan, Adrienne Lambert, Zelda Clements, Millie Khan (Matamata) | |
| 1991 | Rhoda Ryan, Adrienne Lambert, Zelda Clements, Mavis Buchanan (Matamata) | |
| 1992 | Dale Clements, Thelma Kidd, Gladys Moore, Pat Madill (Matamata) | |
| 1993 | Jean Caddie, Mavis Buchanan, Bev Green, Norma Gallagher (Gate Pa) | |
| 1994 | Rhoda Ryan, Zelda Clements, Lucille Hughes, June Crow (Matamata) | |
| 1995 | Denise Page, Marie Watson, Bev Morel, Raelene Peters (Linwood) | |
| 1996 | Val Mathews, Shirley Fielding, Shirley Brett, Ngaire Dean (Putaruru) | |
| 1997 | Millie Khan (Matamata), Bev Corbett (Hinuera), Min Risbridge (Tokoroa), Jan Khan (Beckenham) | |
| 1998 | Mata McEwan (Caledonian), Joan Evans (Fairfield), Gloria Shine (St Kilda), Janet Swallow (Fairfield) | |
| 1999 | Marlene Castle (Orewa), Carole Fredrick, Mary Guldbrandsen (Sunnybrae), Paulette Mytton (Browns Bay) | |
| 2000 | Judy Howat, Barbara Herrett, Tui Scrimshaw, Christine Allan (The Park Kilbirnie) | |
| 2001 | Millie Khan (Matamata), Mina Paul (Ngongotahā), Marina Khan (Matamata), Jan Khan (Beckenham) | |
| 2002 | Millie Khan (Matamata), Mina Paul (Ngongotahā), Marina Khan (Matamata), Jan Khan (Beckenham) | |
| 2003 | Patsy Jorgensen (Tauranga South), Winnie McLelland, Faye Cosgrove & Daphne Hynes (Andersons Bay) | |
| 2004 | Maureen Parker, Norma Stewart, Hetty Bolscher, Janis Scott (New Lynn) | |
| 2005 | Judy Carson, Ann Muir, Caroline Downes, Nancy Jujnovich (Kensington) | |
| 2006 | Lorraine Davis, Bev Heathcote, Karin Ware, Maureen Doherty (Beckenham) | |
| 2007 | Bev Morel, Lois Grey, Pam Phair, Theresa Woodham (Elmwood) | |
| 2008 | Jo Babich (Carlton Cornwall), Jan Malcolm & Rita Berridge (Frankton Railway), Bev Crowe (Carlton Cornwall) | |
| 2009 | Kay Tomlinson (Richmond), Bev White & Josephine Connolly (Omanu), Colleen Kempton (Richmond) | |
| 2010 | Barbara McGregor, Val Smith, Dianne Potts, Dale Bourke (United) | |
| 2011 | Sue Burnand (Frankton Railway), Mandy Boyd (Johnsonville), Angela Boyd (Taradale), Leanne Curry (Frankton Railway) | |
| 2012 | Carole Fredrick, Ruth Lynch, Gayle Melrose, Lisa Helmling (Birkenhead) | |
| 2013 | Heather Johns, Val Keightly, Debbie Smith, Caroline Harris (Paritutu) | |
| 2014 | Mandy Boyd (Burnside), Amy McIlroy (United), Gemma Watts (United), Selina Goddard (Carlton Cornwall) | |
| 2015 | Cynthia Adams (Wanganui), Dot Belliss (Wanganui), Glenis Pidwell (Durie Hill), Pamela Burgess (Wanganui) | |
| 2016 | Mandy Boyd (Burnside), Kirsten Griffin (United), Leigh Griffin (Victoria), Angela Boyd (Burnside) | |
| 2017 | Jo Edwards (United), Val Smith (Merrylands), Kirsten Edwards (United), Tayla Bruce (Burnside) | |
| 2018 | Mandy Boyd (Burnside), Leigh Griffin (Victoria), Sheryl McLean (Canterbury), Angela Boyd (Burnside) | |
| 2019 | Mandy Boyd (Burnside), Kirsten Edwards (Stoke), Leigh Griffin (Victoria), Angela Boyd (Burnside) | |
| 2020 | Sandra Keith (Allenton), Clare Hendra (Silverstream), Selina Smith (Takapuna), Tayla Bruce (Burnside) | |
| 2021 | Mandy Boyd (Burnside), Kirsten Edwards (Stoke), Leigh Griffin (Victoria), Angela Boyd (Burnside) | |
| 2022 | Cancelled due to the COVID-19 pandemic | |
| 2023 | Val Smith (Nelson), Debbie White (Hinuera), Ashleigh Jeffcoat, Kimberley Hemmingway (Carlton Cornwall) | |
| 2024 | Dale Rayner & Kaaren Guilford (Johnsonville), Reen Belliss (Aramoho), Linda Ralph (Carlton Cornwall) | |
| 2025 | Val Smith (Nelson), Debbie White (Hinuera), Ashleigh Jeffcoat (Carlton Cornwall), Kimberley Hemingway (Auckland) | |

== See also ==
- Bowls New Zealand
