= Tayla Bruce =

New Zealand lawn bowls player

Personal information
- Born: 22 February 1995 (age 31) Christchurch, New Zealand
- Height: 1.78 m (5 ft 10 in)
- Weight: 72 kg (159 lb)

Sport
- Country: New Zealand
- Sport: Lawn bowls
- Club: Burnside Bowling Club

Achievements and titles
- National finals: Singles champion (2022); Pairs champion (2023); Fours champion (2017, 2020)
- Highest world ranking: 2 (August 2024)
Medal record
Women's lawn bowls
Representing New Zealand
World Outdoor Championships
Gold medal – first place	2023 Gold Coast	singles
Silver medal – second place	2023 Gold Coast	triples
Gold medal – first place	2023 Gold Coast	team
Commonwealth Games
Bronze medal – third place	2022 Birmingham	fours
Bronze medal – third place	2022 Birmingham	triples
World Champion of Champions
Gold medal – first place	2022 Wellington	singles
World Bowls Indoor Championships
Bronze medal – third place	2025 Aberdeen	singles

Tayla Bruce (born 22 February 1995) is a New Zealand international lawn bowls player. She reached a career high ranking of world number 2 in August 2024.

== Bowls career ==
Born in Christchurch in 1995, Bruce plays for the Burnside Bowling Club. She won the 2017 national women's fours title, in a team with Jo Edwards, Val Smith, and Kirsten Edwards. At the annual Canterbury awards, she was named as sportswoman of the year and young player of the year.

She was selected as part of the New Zealand team for the 2018 Commonwealth Games on the Gold Coast in Queensland.

A second national fours title was secured in 2020, playing alongside Sandra Keith, Clare Hendra, and Selina Smith. During the same year she was selected for the 2020 World Outdoor Bowls Championship in Australia but the event was cancelled due to the COVID-19 pandemic.

In 2022, she won her third national title after securing the singles crown. Also in 2022, she competed in the women's triples and the women's fours at the 2022 Commonwealth Games. She won double bronze; in the triples playing with Nicole Toomey and Val Smith and in the fours, playing with Selina Goddard, Toomey and Smith. In November 2022, she won the gold medal at the World Singles Champion of Champions in Wellington, New Zealand.

In January 2023, Bruce won the New Zealand National Bowls Championships women's pairs title with Clare Hendra.

Also in 2023, she was selected again as part of the team to represent New Zealand at the 2023 World Outdoor Bowls Championship. She participated in the women's singles and the women's triples events. In the singles, Bruce won her group undefeated before reaching the semi-final, where she beat Ellen Ryan to set up a final against Kelly McKerihen. In the final, Bruce defeated McKerihen, 21–18. In the triples (partnering Val Smith and Leeane Poulson), the team won the group undefeated before winning a tense quarter final against Malaysia and a semi final against Canada. In the final they met Australia, losing 16–9 but claiming the silver medal.

After winning the 2024 New Zealand national indoor singles she subsequently won the bronze medal at the 2025 World Bowls Indoor Championships in Aberdeen.
