= Selina Goddard =

New Zealand lawn bowls player

Personal information
- Born: 23 July 1994 (age 32) Ōtāhuhu, New Zealand
- Height: 150 cm (4 ft 11 in)

Sport
- Country: New Zealand
- Sport: Lawn bowls
- Club: Takapuna Bowling Club

Achievements and titles
- National finals: singles (2017, 2023) pairs (2020) fours (2014, 2020) mixed pairs (2024)
- Highest world ranking: 1 (November 2025)
Medal record
Women's lawn bowls
Representing New Zealand
World Outdoor Championships
Bronze medal – third place	2023 Gold Coast	Fours
Gold medal – first place	2023 Gold Coast	Team
Commonwealth Games
Bronze medal – third place	2014 Glasgow	Fours
Bronze medal – third place	2022 Birmingham	Pairs
Bronze medal – third place	2022 Birmingham	Fours
Bowls World Cup
Silver medal – second place	2025 Kuala Lumpur	pairs
World Singles Champion of Champions
Bronze medal – third place	2017 Sydney	Singles

Selina Goddard (born 23 July 1994) is a New Zealand international lawn bowls player, playing out of Takapuna Bowling Club. She reached a career high ranking of world number 1 in November 2025.

From 2020 to 2021 she played under the name of Selina Smith.

== Bowls career ==
=== Early career ===
Goddard was introduced to the sport at a young age through her parents, who were keen bowlers. She started playing bowls competitively at age 14, while attending Howick College in Auckland. She was first selected for the New Zealand Under-18 team in 2013, followed by the New Zealand Development team for the 2014 Trans-Tasman series, which the women’s development team won.

=== Commonwealth Games ===
Goddard made her Commonwealth Games debut at the 2014 Games in Glasgow, Scotland, winning a bronze medal in the women’s fours alongside Mandy Boyd, Amy McIlroy, and Val Smith.

At the 2022 Games in Birmingham, England, she won bronze medals in both the women’s pairs with Katelyn Inch and the women’s fours with Val Smith, Nicole Toomey, and Tayla Bruce.

=== World Championships ===
Goddard made her World Championship debut at the 2023 World Outdoor Bowls Championships on the Gold Coast, Queensland. She competed in the women’s pairs and the women’s fours. In the fours, her team won the bronze medal, and the collective efforts of the New Zealand women’s team earned them the Taylor Trophy for being the best-performed women’s team at the event.

At the 2017 World Champion of Champions Singles at St Johns Park Bowling Club in Sydney, Australia, Goddard won the bronze medal.

=== International Competitions ===
Goddard has been a regular member of the New Zealand side in the Trans-Tasman series from 2015 to 2025, including being part of the winning open women’s team at the 2016 event in Christchurch, New Zealand. She has also enjoyed success at the Multi-Nations, winning bronze medals in the women’s fours and triples in 2016, and claiming the pairs title with Katelyn Inch in 2023 on the Gold Coast, Queensland, Australia. In 2024, she secured a bronze medal in the women's pairs in Hong Kong International Bowls Classic with Briar Atkinson. In 2025, she achieved a historic clean sweep at the Victorian Open, winning the singles, pairs, and triples titles, and also claimed the women’s pairs title at the Australian Open with Chloe Stewart.

In November 2025, partnering Katelyn Inch, she won the silver medal at the 2025 Bowls World Cup.

=== National Titles ===
Goddard has won six New Zealand National Bowls Championship Titles:

- 2014 – Fours (with Mandy Boyd, Amy McIlroy, Gemma Watts)
- 2017 – Singles
- 2020 – Pairs (with Katelyn Inch) and Fours (with Tayla Bruce, Clare Hendra, Sandra Keith)
- 2023 – Singles
- 2024 – Mixed Pairs (with Sheldon Bagrie-Howley)
