= Unkovich =

Unkovich is a surname. Notable people with the surname include:

- Nick Unkovich (1923–2005), New Zealand lawn bowler
- Tanya Unkovich, New Zealand politician
