= Clare Hendra =

New Zealand lawn bowls player

Personal information
- Born: Upper Hutt, New Zealand

Sport
- Country: New Zealand
- Sport: Lawn bowls
- Club: Silverstream Bowling Club

Achievements and titles
- National finals: Fours champion (2020); Pairs champion (2023)

Clare Hendra is a New Zealand international lawn and indoor bowls player.

== Bowls career ==
Hendra became a national champion after winning the fours event, playing with Sandra Keith, Selina Smith and Tayla Bruce, at the 2020 New Zealand National Bowls Championships. She was later named as the New Zealand Female Emerging player of the year.

In 2022, she was selected by New Zealand as a reserve for the 2022 Commonwealth Games in Birmingham, England.

In January 2023, Hendra won a second national title, when winning the women's pairs title with Tayla Bruce. She then participated in her first World indoor bowls championship, competing in the singles and mixed pairs at the 2023 World Indoor Bowls Championship.

In 2023, she won her second title at the National Championships, bowling for Silverstream BC.

== Working life ==
Hendra works as a data analyst manager for the Ministry of Education.
