= Tony Grantham =

New Zealand lawn bowler

Personal information
- Born: 30 December 1972 (age 53) Whanganui, New Zealand
- Height: 168 cm (5 ft 6 in)

Sport
- Sport: Lawn bowls
- Club: Mt Albert BC

Achievements and titles
- Highest world ranking: 27 (June 2024)
Medal record
Men's bowls
Representing New Zealand
World Outdoor Championships
Bronze medal – third place	2012 Adelaide	triples
Bronze medal – third place	2023 Gold Coast	fours
World Singles Champion of Champions
Gold medal – first place	2007 Australia	singles
Asia Pacific Championships
Bronze medal – third place	2011 Adelaide	triples
Silver medal – second place	2011 Adelaide	fours

Tony Grantham (born 30 December 1972) is a New Zealand international lawn and indoor bowler.

== Bowls career ==
Grantham from Whanganui, in New Zealand won the singles at the New Zealand National Bowls Championships, which qualified him to play in the 2007 World Singles Champion of Champions event. He won the gold medal in the event beating Will James of Swaziland in the final.

He won two medals at the 2011 Asia Pacific Bowls Championships in Adelaide. One year later he then won a bronze medal in the triples at the 2012 World Outdoor Bowls Championship in Adelaide.

Grantham also competed for New Zealand at the 2014 Commonwealth Games and won further National titles; the 2013/14 pairs and 2013/14 fours title at the New Zealand National Bowls Championships, when bowling for the Birkenhead Bowls Club.

In 2022, he competed in the men's pairs and the men's fours at the 2022 Commonwealth Games.

In 2023, he won his fourth title at the National Championships, bowling for Mt Albert BC. Later in 2023, he was selected as part of the team to represent New Zealand at the 2023 World Outdoor Bowls Championship. He participated in the men's pairs and the men's fours events. In the pairs with Andrew Kelly, they reached the quarter finals before losing to eventual winner Ireland. In the fours partnering Chris Le Lievre, Lance Pascoe and Sheldon Bagrie-Howley, the team won their group before securing a bronze medal, losing to Scotland in the semi final.

In 2024, he successfully defended his pairs title with Gary Lawson at the 2024 New Zealand nationals.

== Personal life ==
His partner is fellow bowls international Leanne Chinery of Canada.
