= Shannon McIlroy =

New Zealand lawn bowler (born 1987)

Personal information
- Born: Shannon John McIlroy; 5 January 1987 (age 39) Gisborne, New Zealand
- Spouse: Amy Brenton (m. 2013)

Sport
- Country: New Zealand
- Sport: Lawn bowls
- Club: Stoke Bowling Club

Achievements and titles
- Highest world ranking: 42 (August 2026)
Medal record
Representing New Zealand
World Outdoor Championships
Bronze medal – third place	2012 Adelaide	singles
Bronze medal – third place	2016 Christchurch	pairs
Gold medal – first place	2016 Christchurch	singles
Gold medal – first place	2016 Christchurch	team
World Singles Champion of Champions
Gold medal – first place	2018 Sydney	men's title
Asia Pacific Bowls Championships
Silver medal – second place	2007 Christchurch	fours
Silver medal – second place	2009 Kuala Lumpur	triples
Gold medal – first place	2015 Christchurch	fours
Bronze medal – third place	2015 Christchurch	pairs
Gold medal – first place	2019 Gold Coast	singles
Gold medal – first place	2019 Gold Coast	pairs

Shannon John McIlroy (born 5 January 1987) is a New Zealand international lawn bowler. He reached a career high ranking of world number 42 in August 2026.

== Bowls career ==
=== World Outdoor Championships ===
McIlroy won a bronze medal in the Men's singles at the 2012 World Outdoor Bowls Championship in Adelaide.

In 2016, he won a bronze medal with Mike Kernaghan at the World Bowls Championship in the Men's Pairs competition in Christchurch before winning the gold medal in the singles.

In 2020 he was selected for the 2020 World Outdoor Bowls Championship in Australia.

=== Commonwealth Games ===
He was selected as part of the New Zealand team for the 2018 Commonwealth Games on the Gold Coast in Queensland where he reached the quarter-finals of the men's singles.

In 2022, he competed in the men's singles and the men's pairs at the 2022 Commonwealth Games.

=== Asia Pacific ===
McIlroy has won six medals at the Asia Pacific Bowls Championships, a fours silver in 2007, a second silver in the triples in 2009 and a fours gold and pairs bronze in 2015 but his greatest success to date was winning double gold at the 2019 Asia Pacific Bowls Championships in the Gold Coast, Queensland, winning the singles and the pairs with Gary Lawson.

=== National ===
He won the 2015/16 and 2017/18 singles title at the New Zealand National Bowls Championships when bowling for the Stoke Bowls Club in addition to the 2004 & 2017/18 fours titles.

== Personal life ==
Of Māori descent, McIlroy affiliates to the Ngāti Porou iwi. He married fellow lawn bowls player Amy Brenton in January 2013.
