= 2023 World Outdoor Bowls Championship – Men's Fours =

Bowls competition

2023 World Outdoor Bowls Championships – Men's fours
- 14th World Outdoor Bowls Championships
- Location: Gold Coast, Australia
- Date: 29 August to 10 September
- Category: World Bowls Championship

The 2023 World Outdoor Bowls Championship – Men's fours will be the 14th edition of the World Championships to be held on the Gold Coast in Queensland, Australia from 29 August to 10 September. There will be five venues; the Broadbeach Bowls Club, Musgrave Hill Bowls Club, Club Helensvale, Paradise Point Club and Mudgeraba Club.

The Men's fours is one of eight events that will determine the 2023 world champions.

== Section tables ==
=== Section 1 ===
Team	Player	P	W	D	L	Shots	Pts
1	(New Zealand) Tony Grantham, Chris Le Lievre, Lance Pascoe, Sheldon Bagrie-Howley	7	6	0	1	60	18
2	(Cook Islands) Aidan Zittersteijn, Adoni Wichman Rairoa, Taiki Paniani, Teora Turua	7	5	0	2	13	15
3	(South Africa) Bradley Robinson, Victor Siphali, Niksa Benguric, Jason Evans	7	4	1	2	35	13
4	(India) Sunil Bahadur, Navneet Singh, Chandan Kumar Singh, Dinesh Kumar	7	3	1	3	5	10
5	(Fiji) Lal Chand Prasad, Munesh Kumar, Semesa Naiseruvati, Rejnesh Prasad	7	3	0	4	11	9
6	(Singapore) Harriman Yuen, Deepan Ramachandran, Thomas Leong Khim Hoong, Matthew Ngui Ming Fook	7	3	0	4	-19	9
7	(Zimbabwe) Grant Clift, Bryan Ray, Myles Hooper, Clive Roberston	7	3	0	4	-32	9
8	(Switzerland) Christian Haldimann, Thomas Schneiter, Thomas Walti, Beat Matti	7	0	0	7	-73	0
9	(Kenya) Kjellan Awour, Anwar Mbarak Hamanda, Benson Kariuki Wambugu, Joseph Kitosi Muta	withdrew					

=== Section 2 ===
Team	Player	P	W	D	L	Shots	Pts
1	(Australia) Corey Wedlock, Aaron Teys, Carl Healey, Aron Sherriff	8	8	0	0	100	24
2	(Wales) Owain Dando, Chris Klefenz, Ross Owen, Jarrad Breen	8	6	1	1	57	19
3	(Namibia) Christo Steenkamp, Andre Campbell, Colin Peake, Johan Jacobs	8	4	1	3	-5	13
4	(Malaysia) Haiqal Azami, Idham Amin Ramlan, Hizlee Abdul Rais, Soufi Rusli	8	4	0	4	27	12
5	(Malta) Peter Ellul, Wesley Hedges, Jason Borg, Troy Lorimer	8	4	0	4	-37	12
6	(Norfolk Island) Tony Scicluna, Matt Bigg, Teddy Evans, Ryan Dixon	8	3	0	5	-2	9
7	(Philippines) Elmer Abatayo, Hommer Mercado, Leoncio Carreon Jr., Ronald Lising	8	3	0	5	-19	9
8	(Japan) Takashi Ohira, Tetsuya Hirouchi, Hisaharu Sato, Kenichi Emura	8	2	0	6	-49	6
9	(Papua New Guinea) J Walsh, K Walsh, Kenneth Ikirima, Fred Koisen	8	1	0	7	-72	3

=== Section 3 ===
Team	Player	P	W	D	L	Shots	Pts
1	Stuart Bennett, Adam McKeown, Ian McClure, Martin McHugh	7	6	1	0	99	19
2	(United States) Bob Schneider, Bill Brault, Loren Dion, Aaron Zangl	7	5	0	2	58	15
3	(Israel) Danny Alonim, Selwyn Hare, Dani Slodownik, Allan Saitowitz	7	4	0	3	35	12
4	(Jersey) Derek Boswell, Taylor Greechan, Kevin Le Long, Greg Davis	7	4	0	3	-9	12
5	(Macau) Chan Kim Meng, Leong Sio Kei, Wong Chi Hong, Cheong Pak Keong	7	3	1	3	-29	10
6	(Turkey) Baris Islam Bolat, Ege Guzelocak, Serkan Akar Ozkan Akar	7	2	0	5	-47	6
7	(Botswana) Michael Gabobewe, Diane Nixon Senna, Andre van de Walt, Binesh Desai	7	2	0	5	-50	6
8	(Niue) Tifaga Tuipuiliu Lologa, Tukala Tagelagi, Keith Papani, Gregory Funaki	7	6	0	1	-57	3

=== Section 4 ===
Team	Player	P	W	D	L	Shots	Pts
1	(Scotland) Jason Banks, Derek Oliver, Paul Foster MBE, Alex Marshall MBE	7	6	0	1	74	19
2	(Hong Kong) Imen Tang, Stephen Sy, James Po, Lee Ka Ho	7	5	1	1	24	16
3	(England) Louis Ridout, Ed Morris, Nick Brett, Jamie Walker	7	5	0	2	54	15
4	(Thailand) Patawee Montien, Naret Aiangetuen, Wattana Kadkhunthod, Thanakrit Thammasarn	7	5	0	2	48	15
5	(Canada) Owen Kirby, Rob Law, John Bezear, Cameron Lefresne	7	3	0	4	11	9
6	(Argentina) Daniel Saint Genez, Javier Llauro, Jorge Barreto, Raul Pollet	7	2	0	5	-21	6
7	(Samoa) Tasesa Tafeaga, Edward Pio Bell, Lafaele Lotomau, Asuao Manu Faauma	7	1	0	6	-74	3
8	(France) Dorian Dumont, Maxime Faure, Guillaume Hertzog, David Ducote	7	0	0	7	-116	0

== Finals ==
Play Offs
New Zealand	14
Hong Kong	12
Scotland	20
Cook Islands	12
Australia	15
United States	11
Ireland	16
Wales	10

Semifinals
New Zealand	8
Scotland	18
Australia	17
Ireland	9

Gold medal
Scotland	10
Australia	12

== Results ==
Men's fours section 1
Round 1 (4 Sep)		
New Zealand	Switzerland	21–6
South Africa	Cook Islands	10–13
India	Zimbabwe	20–11
Singapore	Fiji	12–8
Round 2 (5 Sep)		
Singapore	Zimbabwe	11–20
South Africa	India	11–11
New Zealand	Cook Islands	17–9
Kenya	Switzerland	+
Round 3 (5 Sep)		
Kenya	South Africa	+
Switzerland	Zimbabwe	14–20
Cook Islands	Fiji	14–11
India	Singapore	12–17
Round 4 (5 Sep)		
Fiji	India	25–11
Zimbabwe	Cook Islands	15–13
Switzerland	South Africa	17–19
New Zealand	Kenya	+
Round 5 (6 Sep)		
Zimbabwe	New Zealand	9–25
Fiji	Kenya	+
Singapore	Switzerland	17–10
Cook Islands	India	12–10
Round 6 (6 Sep)		
Cook Islands	Singapore	16–8
Switzerland	Fiji	7–21
Kenya	Zimbabwe	+
South Africa	New Zealand	12–13
Round 7 (7 Sep)		
South Africa	Fiji	21–3
New Zealand	Singapore	18–12
India	Kenya	+
Switzerland	Cook Islands	10–17
Round 8 (7 Sep)		
India	Switzerland	26–10
Singapore	Kenya	+
New Zealand	Fiji	15–6
South Africa	Fiji	19–8
Round 9 (7 Sep)		
Kenya	Cook Islands	+
India	New Zealand	13–12
Singapore	South Africa	11–23
Fiji	Zimbabwe	19–6

Men's fours section 2
Round 1 (4 Sep)		
Australia	Philippines	22–5
Malaysia	Malta	11–13
Namibia	Wales	12–12
Japan	Norfolk Island	4–16
Round 2 (5 Sep)		
Japan	Wales	8–26
Malaysia	Namibia	11–13
Australia	Malta	21–5
Papua New Guinea	Philippines	7–14
Round 3 (5 Sep)		
Papua New Guinea	Malaysia	8–16
Philippines	Wales	8–13
Malta	Norfolk Island	6–20
Namibia	Japan	22–12
Round 4 (5 Sep)		
Norfolk Island	Namibia	18–13
Wales	Malta	18–6
Philippines	Malaysia	9–15
Australia	Papua New Guinea	35–6
Round 5 (6 Sep)		
Wales	Australia	14–16
Norfolk Island	Papua New Guinea	8–18
Japan	Philippines	15–10
Malta	Namibia	9–16
Round 6 (6 Sep)		
Malta	Japan	16–14
Philippines	Norfolk Island	15–8
Papua New Guinea	Wales	8–21
Malaysia	Australia	14–16
Round 7 (7 Sep)		
Malaysia	Norfolk Island	15–11
Australia	Japan	23–8
Namibia	Papua New Guinea	14–11
Philippines	Malta	14–19
Round 8 (7 Sep)		
Namibia	Philippines	9–14
Japan	Papua New Guinea	11–15
Australia	Norfolk Island	11–9
Malaysia	Wales	12–13
Round 9 (7 Sep)		
Papua New Guinea	Malta	10–13
Namibia	Australia	4–21
Japan	Malaysia	5–21
Norfolk Island	Wales	13–23

Men's fours section 3
Round 1 (4 Sep)		
Ireland	Macau	13–13
United States	Botswana	12–6
Turkey	Jersey	17–13
Niue	Israel	0–3
Round 2 (5 Sep)		
Ireland	Jersey	18–4
United States	Macau	23–7
Israel	Botswana	18–9
Niue	Turkey	13–10
Round 3 (5 Sep)		
Jersey	Macau	17–10
United States	Israel	15–9
Ireland	Niue	23–7
Botswana	Turkey	14–8
Round 4 (5 Sep)		
Macau	Israel	4–19
Jersey	Niue	17–9
United States	Turkey	11–12
Ireland	Botswana	40–6
Round 5 (6 Sep)		
Macau	Niue}	13–11
Israel	Turkey	28–9
Jersey	Botswana	16–13
Ireland	United States	19–10
Round 6 (6 Sep)		
Turkey	Macau	10–12
Niue	Botswana	14–15
Israel	Ireland	10–14
Jersey	United States	11–21
Round 7 (7 Sep)		
Botswana	Macau	9–14
Turkey	Ireland	8–30
Niue	United States	3–33
Israel	Jersey	14–15

Men's fours section 4
Round 1 (4 Sep)		
Scotland	Argentina	19–9
England	Samoa	24–4
France	Hong Kong	9–19
Thailand	Canada	23–7
Round 2 (5 Sep)		
Scotland	Hong Kong	13–13
England	Argentina	23–12
Canada	Samoa	23–5
Thailand	France	27–4
Round 3 (5 Sep)		
Hong Kong	Argentina	18–7
England	Canada	19–11
Scotland	Thailand	16–11
Samoa	France	19–7
Round 4 (5 Sep)		
Argentina	Canada	6–18
Hong Kong	Thailand	11–17
England	France	22–6
Scotland	Samoa	33–4
Round 5 (6 Sep)		
Argentina	Thailand	9–12
Canada	France	20–6
Hong Kong	Samoa	19–15
Scotland	England	14–10
Round 6 (6 Sep)		
France	Argentina	3–24
Thailand	Samoa	18–8
Canada	Scotland	10–16
Hong Kong	England	13–11
Round 7 (7 Sep)		
Samoa	Argentina	10–15
France	Scotland	6–26
Thailand	England	9–14
Canada	Hong Kong	16–19

+forfeited
