= 2023 World Outdoor Bowls Championship – Men's Triples =

Bowls competition

2023 World Outdoor Bowls Championships – Men's triples
- 14th World Outdoor Bowls Championships
- Location: Gold Coast, Australia
- Date: 29 August to 10 September
- Category: World Bowls Championship

The 2023 World Outdoor Bowls Championship – Men's triples will be the 14th edition of the World Championships to be held on the Gold Coast in Queensland, Australia from 29 August to 10 September. There will be five venues; the Broadbeach Bowls Club, Musgrave Hill Bowls Club, Club Helensvale, Paradise Point Club and Mudgeraba Club.

The men's triples is one of eight events that will determine the 2023 world champions.

== Section tables ==
=== Section 1 ===
Team	Player	P	W	D	L	Pts	Shots
1	(England) Louis Ridout, Nick Brett, Jamie Walker	7	6	0	1	18	61
2	(Thailand) Patawee Montien, Naret Aiangetuen, Thanakrit Thammasarn	7	5	0	2	15	29
3	(Canada) Owen Kirby, Rob Law, Cameron Lefresne	7	4	0	3	12	23
4	(Jersey) Taylor Greechan, Kevin Le Long, Greg Davis	7	3	1	3	10	-6
5	(Israel) Tzvika Hadar, Selwyn Hare, Allan Saitowitz	7	3	1	3	10	-8
6	(Norfolk Island) Tony Scicluna, Teddy Evans, Ryan Dixon	7	3	0	4	9	-38
7	(Namibia) Andre Campbell, Colin Peake, Johan Jacobs	7	1	1	5	4	-30
8	(Singapore) Harriman Yuen, Thomas Leong Khim Hoong, Matthew Ngui Ming Fook	7	1	1	5	4	-31
9	(Kenya) Kjellan Awour, Anwar Hamanda, Joseph Kitosi Muta	withdrew					

=== Section 2 ===
Team	Player	P	W	D	L	Pts	Shots
1	(Malaysia) Haiqal Azami, Idham Amin Ramlan, Hizlee Abdul Rais	8	7	0	1	21	117
2	(Australia) Corey Wedlock, Aron Sherriff, Carl Healey	8	6	0	2	18	139
3	(India) Navneet Singh, Chandan Kumar Singh, Dinesh Kumar	8	7	0	1	18	87
4	(Fiji) Kushal Pillay, Semesa Naiseruvati, Rejnesh Prasad	8	5	0	3	15	39
5	(Zimbabwe) Grant Clift, Bryan Ray, Lionel Coventry	8	5	0	3	15	16
6	(France) Maxime Faure, Dorian Dumont, David Ducote	8	4	0	4	12	1
7	(Samoa) Edward Pio Bell, Lafaele Lotomau, Asuao Manu Faauma	8	1	0	7	3	-90
8	(Argentina) Daniel Saint Genez, Javier Llauro, Jorge Barreto	8	1	0	7	3	-111
9	(Turkey) Baris Islam Bolat, Zafer Yaman, Ege Guzelocak	8	1	0	7	3	-198

=== Section 3 ===
Team	Player	P	W	D	L	Pts	Shots
1	(United States) Bill Brault, Aaron Zangl, Loren Dion	7	6	0	1	18	67
2	Stuart Bennett, Ian McClure, Martin McHugh	7	6	0	1	18	57
3	(South Africa) Bradley Robinson, Victor Siphali, Jason Evans	7	5	0	2	15	40
4	(New Zealand) Chris Le Lievre, Lance Pascoe, Sheldon Bagrie-Howley	7	4	0	3	12	68
5	(Hong Kong) Imen Tang, Stephen Sy, James Po	7	4	0	3	12	9
6	(Botswana) Baven Balendra, Andre van de Walt, Binesh Desai	7	2	0	5	6	-43
7	(Papua New Guinea) J Morgan, Kenneth Ikirima, K Walsh	7	1	0	6	3	-72
8	(Switzerland) Christian Haldimann, Thomas Schneiter, Thomas Walti	7	0	0	7	0	-126

=== Section 4 ===
Team	Player	P	W	D	L	Pts	Shots
1	(Scotland) Paul Foster MBE, Derek Oliver, Alex Marshall MBE	7	6	1	0	19	84
2	(Japan) Hisaharu Sato, Kenichi Emura, Kenta Hasebe	7	5	0	2	15	70
3	(Wales) Owain Dando, Chris Klefenz, Ross Owen	7	4	1	2	13	54
4	(Cook Islands) Royden Aperau, Adoni Wichman Rairoa, Teora Turua	7	3	2	2	11	26
5	(Malta) Peter Ellul, Jason Borg, Troy Lorimer	7	3	0	4	9	-20
6	(Philippines) Hommer Mercado, Leoncio Carreon Jr., Ronald Lising	7	2	0	5	6	-19
7	(Macau) Chan Kim Meng, Lam Su Hong, Leong Sio Kei	7	2	0	5	6	-60
8	(Niue) Tifaga Tuipuiliu Lologa, Tukala Tagelagi, Stanley Frederick Tafatu	7	1	0	6	3	-135

== Finals ==
Play Offs
England	17
Japan	14
Scotland	17
Thailand	13
Malaysia	13
Ireland	14
United States	7
Australia	22

Semifinals
England	13
Scotland	23
Ireland	11
Australia	23

Gold medal
Scotland	8
Australia	17

== Results ==
Men's triples section 1
Round 1 (28 Aug)		
England	Thailand	17–16
Namibia	Singapore	14–14
Israel	Singapore	13–13
Norfolk Island	Canada	9–30
Round 2 (29 Aug)		
Norfolk Island	Jersey	17–13
Namibia	Israel	21–17
England	Singapore	22–9
Kenya	Thailand	+
Round 3 (29 Aug)		
Kenya	Namibia	+
Thailand	Jersey	20–14
Singapore	Canada	18–17
Israel	Norfolk Island	15–12
Round 4 (29 Aug)		
Canada	Israel	12–17
Jersey	Singapore	18–16
Thailand	Namibia	19–11
England	Kenya	+
Round 5 (30 Aug)		
Jersey	England	10–24
Canada	Kenya	+
Norfolk Island	Thailand	11–14
Singapore	Israel	14–21
Round 6 (30 Aug)		
Singapore	Norfolk Island	12–17
Thailand	Canada	13–16
Kenya	Jersey	+
Namibia	England	13–22
Round 7 (31 Aug)		
Namibia	Canada	16–23
England	Norfolk Island	27–5
Israel	Kenya	+
Thailand	Singapore	15–10
Round 8 (31 Aug)		
Israel	Thailand	15–26
Norfolk Island	Kenya	+
England	Canada	9–15
Namibia	Jersey	13–21
Round 9 (31 Aug)		
Kenya	Singapore	+
Israel	England	9–17
Norfolk Island	Namibia	15–13
Canada	Jersey	12–20

Men's triples section 2
Round 1 (28 Aug)		
Australia	India	14–22
Samoa	Turkey	28–6
France	Zimbabwe	14–20
Malaysia	Fiji	15–10
Round 2 (29 Aug)		
Malaysia	Zimbabwe	11–16
Samoa	France	15–17
Australia	Turkey	65–0
Argentina	India	12–25
Round 3 (29 Aug)		
Argentina	Samoa	14–13
India	Zimbabwe	27–12
Turkey	Fiji	13–19
France	Malaysia	8–25
Round 4 (30 Aug)		
Fiji	France	15–18
Zimbabwe	Turkey	20–10
India	Samoa	32–7
Australia	Argentina	32–7
Round 5 (30 Aug)		
Zimbabwe	Australia	15–19
Fiji	Argentina	33–3
Malaysia	India	18–11
Turkey	France	9–33
Round 6 (30 Aug)		
Turkey	Malaysia	4–43
India	Fiji	16–26
Argentina	Zimbabwe	18–22
Samoa	Australia	5–39
Round 7 (31 Aug)		
Samoa	Fiji	5–20
Australia	Malaysia	11–12
France	Argentina	19–14
India	Turkey	40–5
Round 8 (31 Aug)		
France	India	10–18
Malaysia	Argentina	40–8
Australia	Fiji	25–7
Samoa	Zimbabwe	10–24
Round 9 (31 Aug)		
Argentina	Turkey	13–16
France	Australia	17–19
Malaysia	Samoa	30–9
Fiji	Zimbabwe	23–19

Men's triples section 3
Round 1 (28 Aug)		
New Zealand	Botswana	24–7
Ireland	Papua New Guinea	34–12
Hong Kong	United States	8–18
Switzerland	South Africa	15–31
Round 2 (29 Aug)		
New Zealand	United States	17–11
Ireland	Botswana	20–9
South Africa	Papua New Guinea	25–15
Switzerland	Hong Kong	14–29
Round 3 (29 Aug)		
United States	Botswana	21–14
Ireland	South Africa	22–17
New Zealand	Switzerland	39–6
Papua New Guinea	Hong Kong	16–18
Round 4 (30 Aug)		
Botswana	South Africa	11–26
United States	Switzerland	26–4
Ireland	Hong Kong	21–13
New Zealand	Papua New Guinea	28–5
Round 5 (30 Aug)		
Botswana	Switzerland	28–11
South Africa	Hong Kong	22–16
United States	Papua New Guinea	26–5
New Zealand	Ireland	15–17
Round 6 (30 Aug)		
Hong Kong	Botswana	24–10
Switzerland	Papua New Guinea	14–24
South Africa	New Zealand	21–14
United States	Ireland	20–16
Round 7 (31 Aug)		
Papua New Guinea	Botswana	12–16
Hong Kong	New Zealand	16–14
Switzerland	Ireland	11–24
South Africa	United States	13–22

Men's triples section 4
Round 1 (28 Aug)		
Japan	Cook Islands	20–15
Scotland	Malta	21–11
Philippines	Wales	15–17
Macau	Niue	23–7
Round 2 (29 Aug)		
Japan	Wales	18–12
Scotland	Cook Islands	15–15
Niue	Malta	11–21
Macau	Philippines	15–11
Round 3 (29 Aug)		
Wales	Cook Islands	16–16
Scotland	Niue	48–2
Japan	Macau	33–5
Malta	Philippines	13–15
Round 4 (30 Aug)		
Cook Islands	Niue	21–7
Wales	Macau	25–9
Scotland	Philippines	20–13
Japan	Malta	17–20
Round 5 (30 Aug)		
Cook Islands	Macau	27–8
Niue	Philippines	29–17
Wales	Malta	31–11
Japan	Scotland	13–14
Round 6 (30 Aug)		
Philippines	Cook Islands	18–10
Macau	Malta	12–17
Niue	Japan	4–35
Wales	Scotland	11–19
Round 7 (31 Aug)		
Malta	Cook Islands	13–19
Philippines	Japan	15–19
Macau	Scotland	10–22
Niue	Wales	6–36

+ Kenya forfeited
