= John Somerville (bowls) =

Jack Somerville
Personal information
- Born: John Somerville; 10 September 1926
- Died: 5 March 1987 (aged 60) Auckland, New Zealand

Sport
- Sport: Lawn bowls
- Club: Rewa Bowling Club

Achievements and titles
- National finals: Fours champion (1971, 1985, 1986)
Medal record
Men's lawn bowls
Representing New Zealand
British Commonwealth Games
Gold medal – first place	1974 Christchurch	Fours

John Somerville (10 September 1926 – 5 March 1987) was a New Zealand lawn bowls player.

== Bowls career ==
At the 1974 British Commonwealth Games, Somerville won the men's fours gold medal partnering David Baldwin, Kerry Clark and Gordon Jolly.

A member of the Rewa Bowling Club, Somerville won the 1971, 1985 and 1986 fours title at the New Zealand National Bowls Championships.

== Awards ==
In 2013, Somerville was an inaugural inductee into the Bowls New Zealand Hall of Fame.
