= Justin Goodwin =

New Zealand international lawn bowler (born 1976)

Personal information
- Full name: Justin William Goodwin
- Nationality: New Zealander
- Born: 15 July 1976 (age 49)
Medal record
Representing (New Zealand)
Asia Pacific Bowls Championships
Gold medal – first place	2005 Melbourne	triples

Justin William Goodwin (born 15 July 1976) is a New Zealand international lawn bowler.

== Bowls career ==
Goodwin has represented New Zealand at the Commonwealth Games, in the triples event at the 2006 Commonwealth Games.

He won a gold medal in the triples with Gary Lawson and Richard Girvan, at the 2005 Asia Pacific Bowls Championships in Melbourne.
