= Jamie Hill =

New Zealand international lawn and indoor bowler

Personal information
- Born: 5 February 1981 (age 45) Papakura, New Zealand

Sport
- Country: New Zealand
- Sport: Lawn bowls
- Club: Avondale Bowling Club; Mount Albert Bowling Club
Medal record
Representing New Zealand
Men's lawn bowls
Asia Pacific Bowls Championships
Gold medal – first place	2003 Brisbane	Triples
Silver medal – second place	2003 Brisbane	Fours
Silver medal – second place	2009 Kuala Lumpur	Pairs
Silver medal – second place	2019 Gold Coast	Triples
Silver medal – second place	2019 Gold Coast	Fours
National Championships
Gold medal – first place	2002	fours
Gold medal – first place	2003	fours
Gold medal – first place	2020	fours
Gold medal – first place	2021	pairs
Gold medal – first place	2025	pairs

Jamie Peter Hill (born 5 February 1981) is a New Zealand international lawn bowler.

== Bowls career ==
Hill became the youngest player to represent New Zealand in 2003 when aged 22. He had gained selection after twice winning the fours national title in successive years (2002 and 2003) bowling for Avondale Bowling Club. Additionally Hill won a gold medal in the triples and silver medal in the fours at the 2003 Asia Pacific Bowls Championships in Brisbane.

Hill represented New Zealand in the pairs tournament at the 2006 Commonwealth Games in Melbourne.

In 2009, Hill won a silver in the pairs at the Asia Pacific Championships before returning in 2019 and winning double silver in the triples and fours in the Gold Coast, Queensland.

In 2020 and 17 years after winning his first national titles and bowling for Mount Albert, he was a member of the fours that secured the national title. The following year he partnered Lance Pascoe, when winning the 2021 pairs title.

Hill won a second national pairs title with Pascoe in 2025.
