= Mandy Boyd =

New Zealand bowls player

Personal information
- Nationality: New Zealand
- Born: 15 October 1991 (age 35) Napier, New Zealand

Sport
- Sport: Bowls
- Club: Burnside

Achievements and titles
- Highest world ranking: 29 (August 2026)
Medal record
Representing New Zealand
Commonwealth Games
| Bronze medal – third place | 2014 Glasgow | Women's fours |
World Outdoor Championships
| Silver medal – second place | 2012 Adelaide | Women's triples |
| Silver medal – second place | 2012 Adelaide | Women's team |

Mandy Boyd (born 15 October 1991) is a New Zealand international lawn bowls player. She reached a highest world ranking of number 29 in August 2026.

== Bowls career ==
Mandy followed her sister Angela Boyd into the sport, and started playing in 2006 while at Napier Girls' High School.

Boyd competed at the 2014 Commonwealth Games as part of the women's triples and women's fours teams. She won a bronze medal in the women's fours events along with teammates Selina Goddard, Amy McIlroy and Val Smith.

She was selected as part of the New Zealand team for the 2018 Commonwealth Games on the Gold Coast in Queensland.

In addition to her international success she has won the 2015 & 2016 pairs titles with her sister and six 'fours' titles (2011, 2014, 2016, 2018, 2019, 2021) at the New Zealand National Bowls Championships when bowling for the Burnside Bowls Club.
