= Chris Le Lievre =

New Zealand lawn bowler

Personal information
- Nationality: New Zealander
- Born: 1985 (age 40–41)

Sport
- Sport: Lawn bowls
- Club: Musgrave Hill BC
Medal record
Men's bowls
Representing New Zealand
World Outdoor Championships
Bronze medal – third place	2023 Gold Coast	fours
National Championships
Gold medal – first place	2008	fours
Gold medal – first place	2011	pairs

Chris Le Lievre (born 1985) is a New Zealand international lawn bowler.

== Career ==
In 2009, Le Lievre was selected for the New Zealand under-25 side to face Australia in the Trans-Tasman Test Series.

He has won two gold medals in the fours (2008) and pairs (2011) at the New Zealand National Bowls Championships.

In 2022, Le Lievre was a reserve for the 2022 Commonwealth Games in Birmingham.

In 2023, he was selected as part of the team to represent New Zealand at the 2023 World Outdoor Bowls Championship. He participated in the men's triples and the men's fours events. In the fours partnering Tony Grantham, Lance Pascoe and Sheldon Bagrie-Howley, the team won their group before securing a bronze medal, losing to Scotland in the semi final.
