= Mike Galloway (bowls) =

Lawn bowler from New Zealand

Personal information
- Born: 14 June 1966 (age 59)

Sport
- Country: New Zealand
- Sport: Lawn bowls
- Club: Royal Oak Bowls; Pakuranga Bowling Club

Achievements and titles
- National finals: Singles (2021); Pairs (2001), Fours (2024, 2025)

Mike Galloway (born 1966) is a New Zealand international lawn bowler. He is a double National champion and represented New Zealand at the Commonwealth Games.

== Bowls career ==
Galloway made his international debut in 1997 against Fiji. He won the New Zealand National Bowls Championships, first in 2001, when winning the pairs with David Clark when bowling for Pakuranga and then 20 years later when winning the singles title bowling for Royal Oak.

Galloway was awarded the joint 2020-21 male New Zealand Player of the Year. In 2022, he was selected for the men's triples and men's fours events at the 2022 Commonwealth Games in Birmingham.

In 2024, Galloway won another National Bowls Championships, when claiming the fours title with Martin Dixon, Steve Fisher and David Clark and repeated the success in February 2025.

== Personal life ==
Galloway is an Auckland-based greenkeeper by trade.
