= Denise Page =

New Zealand lawn bowler

Personal information
- Nationality: New Zealander

Sport
- Club: Linwood BC; Parklands BC
Medal record
Representing (New Zealand)
Asia Pacific Bowls Championships
Gold medal – first place	1985 Tweed Heads	fours
Silver medal – second place	1985 Tweed Heads	triples

Denise Page is a former New Zealand international lawn bowler.

== Bowls career ==
Page has represented New Zealand at the Commonwealth Games, in the fours event at the 1986 Commonwealth Games.

She won gold and silver medal at the inaugural 1985 Asia Pacific Bowls Championships, in Tweed Heads.

She is a two times New Zealand champion winning the 1987 pairs and 1995 fours titles at the New Zealand National Bowls Championships.
