= Leeane Poulson =

New Zealand lawn bowler

Personal information
- Nationality: New Zealander
- Born: 1962 (age 63–64)

Sport
- Sport: Lawn bowls
- Club: Papakura BC

Achievements and titles
- Highest world ranking: 12 (September 2024)
Medal record
Women's bowls
Representing New Zealand
World Outdoor Championships
Silver medal – second place	2023 Gold Coast	triples
Bronze medal – third place	2023 Gold Coast	fours
Gold medal – first place	2023 Gold Coast	team
Australian Open
Gold medal – first place	2018	fours

Leeane Poulson (born 1962) is a horse racing trainer and a New Zealand international lawn bowler. She reached a career high ranking of world number 12 in September 2024.

== Career ==
Poulson won the gold medal in the fours at the 2018 Australian Open.

In 2022, Poulson was named as a reserve for the 2022 Commonwealth Games.

In 2023, she was selected as part of the team to represent New Zealand at the 2023 World Outdoor Bowls Championship. She participated in the women's triples and the women's fours events. In the fours, her team won the bronze medal. One week later in the triples (partnering Tayla Bruce and Val Smith), the team won the group undefeated before winning a tense quarter final against Malaysia and a semi final against Canada. In the final they met Australia, losing 16–9 but claiming the silver medal.

In 2024, Poulson won the women's singles at the New Zealand National Bowls Championships. By winning the national singles title, she propelled herself into a world ranking high of 16.
