= Val Smith =

New Zealand lawn bowler

Val Smith ONZM
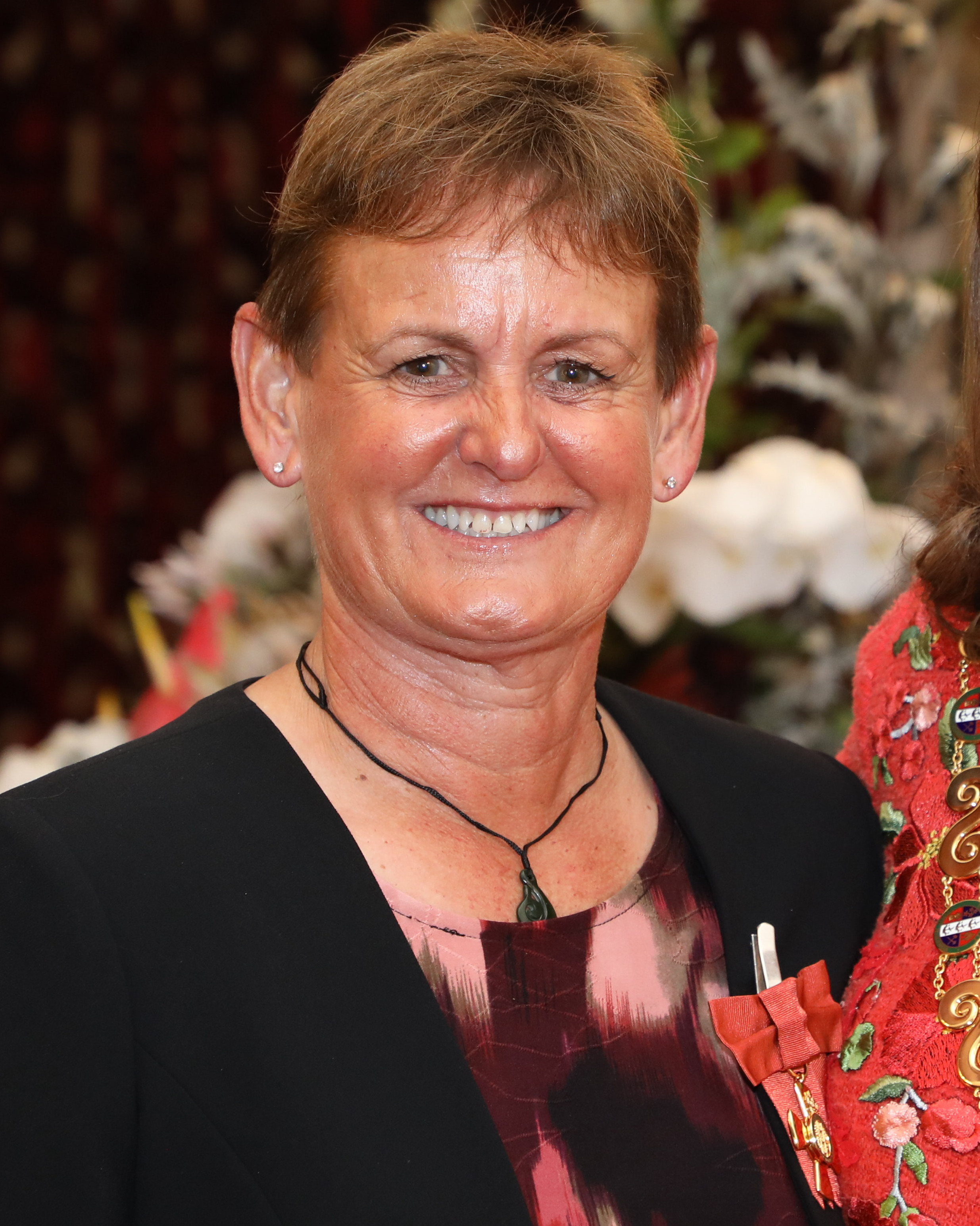
- Smith in 2026

Personal information
- Born: 29 July 1965 (age 61)

Sport
- Country: New Zealand
- Sport: Lawn bowls
- Club: United, Nelson; Merrylands, Sydney
Medal record
Representing New Zealand
World Outdoor Championships
Bronze medal – third place	2004 Leamington Spa	triples
Gold medal – first place	2008 Christchurch	singles
Gold medal – first place	2008 Christchurch	pairs
Silver medal – second place	2008 Christchurch	team
Silver medal – second place	2012 Adelaide	singles
Silver medal – second place	2012 Adelaide	pairs
Silver medal – second place	2012 Adelaide	team
Bronze medal – third place	2016 Christchurch	fours
Bronze medal – third place	2016 Christchurch	team
Bronze medal – third place	2023 Gold Coast	fours
Silver medal – second place	2023 Gold Coast	triples
Gold medal – first place	2023 Gold Coast	team
Commonwealth Games
Silver medal – second place	2010 Delhi	Singles
Bronze medal – third place	2014 Glasgow	fours
Bronze medal – third place	2022 Birmingham	triples
Bronze medal – third place	2022 Birmingham	fours
Asia Pacific Bowls Championships
Gold medal – first place	2003 Brisbane	fours
Bronze medal – third place	2005 Melbourne	pairs
Gold medal – first place	2007 Christchurch	singles
Silver medal – second place	2007 Christchurch	pairs
Gold medal – first place	2011 Adelaide	pairs
Bronze medal – third place	2015 Christchurch	fours
Gold medal – first place	2019 Gold Coast	fours

Valerie Christine Smith ONZM (born 29 July 1965) is an international lawn bowler from New Zealand.

== Bowls career ==
=== World Championships ===
Smith won a bronze medal at the 2004 World Outdoor Bowls Championship in Leamington Spa before winning three medals four years later at the 2008 World Outdoor Bowls Championship in the singles and pairs gold medal and team event (silver medal) in Christchurch, New Zealand. At the 2012 World Outdoor Bowls Championship, Smith won two silver medals in the singles and pairs respectively. In 2016, she won a bronze medal in the fours at the 2016 World Outdoor Bowls Championship in Christchurch with Angela Boyd, Katelyn Inch and Kirsten Edwards.

In 2020, she was selected for the 2020 World Outdoor Bowls Championship in Australia but the event was cancelled due to the COVID-19 pandemic. In 2023, she was selected as part of the team to represent New Zealand at the 2023 World Outdoor Bowls Championship. She participated in the women's triples and the women's fours events. In the fours, her team won the bronze medal. One week later in the triples (partnering Tayla Bruce and Leeane Poulson), the team won the group undefeated before winning a tense quarter final against Malaysia and a semi final against Canada. In the final they met Australia, losing 16–9 but claiming the silver medal.

=== Commonwealth Games ===
Smith competed at the 2006 Commonwealth Games in Melbourne, the women's triples competition and at the 2010 Commonwealth Games in Delhi, where she won a silver medal in the women's singles competition. She competed at the 2014 Commonwealth Games as part of the women's pairs and women's fours teams. She won a bronze medal in the women's fours events alongside teammates Mandy Boyd, Selina Goddard and Amy McIlroy.

She was selected as part of the New Zealand team for the 2018 Commonwealth Games on the Gold Coast in Queensland. In 2022, she competed in the women's triples and the Women's fours at the 2022 Commonwealth Games. In both the triples and the fours she secured a bronze medal.

=== Asia Pacific ===
Smith has won seven medals at the Asia Pacific Bowls Championships including four golds, the latest gold being at the 2019 Asia Pacific Bowls Championships in the Gold Coast, Queensland.

=== National ===
In addition to her international successes Smith has won eight titles at the New Zealand National Bowls Championships. She won the pairs four times in 2004 and 2011 (with Jo Edwards) and 2019 and 2021 (with Lisa Prideaux) and the fours in 2010, 2017, 2023 and 2025.

== Honours and awards ==
In the 2026 New Year Honours, Smith was appointed an Officer of the New Zealand Order of Merit, for services to outdoor bowls.
