= Owen Kirby =

Canadian international lawn bowler

Personal information
- Born: 5 May 1999 (age 27) Kitchener, Ontario, Canada

Sport
- Sport: Lawn bowls
- Club: Heritage Greens LBC
Medal record
Representing Canada
IIBC Championships
Silver medal – second place	2017	U25 mixed doubles

Owen Kirby (born 5 May 1999) is a Canadian international lawn bowler.

== Bowls career ==
Kirby came to prominence in 2017, when he was selected by Canada for the 2017 World Junior Championships in Wales, known as the IIBC Championships. He won the Under-25 mixed doubles silver medal at the Championships.

In 2022, Kirby represented Canada at the Junior World Indoor Bowling Championships in Northern Ireland.

Kirby was selected to represent Canada at the sports blue riband event, the 2023 World Outdoor Bowls Championship. He participated in the men's triples and the men's fours events. In the triples, Kirby finished in third place in his group.

In 2024, Kirby won the singles and pairs titles at the Canadian National Bowls Championships.
