= Andrew Kelly (bowls) =

New Zealand lawn bowler (born 1988)

Personal information
- Born: 8 March 1988 (age 38) Oamaru, New Zealand

Sport
- Country: New Zealand
- Sport: Lawn & indoor bowls
- Club: Dunedin PBA; Canterbury 2017

Achievements and titles
- National finals: Singles champion (2020); Pairs champion (2022); Fours champion (2012, 2014)
Medal record
Representing New Zealand
Men's bowls
Asia Pacific Bowls Championships
Gold medal – first place	2015 Christchurch	Triples
Gold medal – first place	2015 Christchurch	Fours
WB Indoor Championships
Silver medal – second place	2023 Warilla	singles

Andrew Kelly (born 8 March 1988) is a New Zealand international lawn and indoor bowler.

== Early life ==
He grew up in Oamaru, North Otago and was a pupil at Waitaki Boys' High School.

== Bowls career ==
In 2009, he won the Hong Kong International Bowls Classic pairs title with Richard Collett. He was a World Junior champion (2010) and he captained the fours (outdoors) when winning the New Zealand National Bowls Championships in 2012 and 2014, when bowling for the Canterbury 2017 and Redcliffs Bowls Clubs respectively.

He won double gold at the 2015 Asia Pacific Bowls Championships in Christchurch.

In 2018, he qualified for the 2018 World Indoor Bowls Championship where he eliminated six times world champion Alex Marshall. In 2020 he won the singles title at the National Championships. In 2020, he was selected for the 2020 World Outdoor Bowls Championship in Australia but the event was cancelled due to the COVID-19 pandemic During the same year won the national singles. In 2022, he won his fourth national title after winning the pairs.

In 2022, he competed in the men's triples and the men's fours at the 2022 Commonwealth Games. The following year in 2023, he finished runner-up to Aron Sherriff in the singles at the 2023 World Bowls Indoor Championships.

In 2023, he was selected as part of the team to represent New Zealand at the 2023 World Outdoor Bowls Championship. He participated in the men's singles and the men's pairs events. In the pairs with Tony Grantham, they reached the quarter finals before losing to eventual winner Ireland. In the singles, he qualified from his group but then lost to Aaron Wilson at the quarter final stage.
