= Katelyn Inch =

New Zealand lawn bowler

Personal information
- Nationality: New Zealander
- Born: 19 August 1995 (age 31) Rangiora, Canterbury Region
- Education: University of Canterbury

Sport
- Sport: Lawn bowls
- Club: Canterbury Bowling Club and Oxford Club Bowls

Achievements and titles
- Regional finals: Queensland titles 4
- National finals: New Zealand titles 2 Australian title 1
- Highest world ranking: 14 (June 2024)
Medal record
World Outdoor Championships
Bronze medal – third place	2016 Christchurch	fours
Bronze medal – third place	2016 Christchurch	team
Bronze medal – third place	2023 Gold Coast	fours
Gold medal – first place	2023 Gold Coast	team
Commonwealth Games
Bronze medal – third place	2022 Birmingham	pairs
Bowls World Cup
Silver medal – second place	2025 Kuala Lumpur	pairs
Asia Pacific Bowls Championships
Bronze medal – third place	2015 Christchurch	triples
Bronze medal – third place	2015 Christchurch	fours
Gold medal – first place	2019 Gold Coast	fours
WB Indoor Championships
Silver medal – second place	2023 Warilla	singles

Katelyn Inch (born 19 August 1995) is a New Zealand international lawn bowler. She reached a career high ranking of world number 14 in June 2024.

== Bowls career ==
=== World Championships ===
Inch was born in Rangiora and brought up in Oxford, New Zealand. She made her debut for New Zealand in 2015 and won a bronze medal in the fours at the 2016 World Outdoor Bowls Championship in Christchurch with Angela Boyd, Val Smith and Kirsten Edwards.

In 2020, she was selected for the 2020 World Outdoor Bowls Championship in Australia but the event was cancelled due to the COVID-19 pandemic.

In 2023, she won the Australian Open fours and was then selected as part of the team to represent New Zealand at the 2023 World Outdoor Bowls Championship. She participated in the women's pairs and the women's fours events. In the fours, her team won the bronze medal.

=== Commonwealth Games ===
She was selected as part of the New Zealand team for the 2018 Commonwealth Games on the Gold Coast in Queensland. In 2022, she competed in the women's singles and the women's pairs at the 2022 Commonwealth Games. In the pairs she secured a bronze medal.

=== Other ===
Inch has won three medals at the Asia Pacific Bowls Championships, the latest being a gold medal at the 2019 Asia Pacific Bowls Championships in the Gold Coast, Queensland.

In November 2025, partnering Selina Goddard, she won the pairs silver medal at the 2025 Bowls World Cup.

=== Nationals ===
Inch won the 2019 Australian National Bowls Championships pairs with Julie Keegan and the New Zealand National Bowls Championships singles and pairs in 2020.
