= Muhammad Haiqal Azami =

Malaysian lawn bowler

Personal information
- Nationality: Malaysian
- Born: 1999 (age 26–27)

Sport
- Sport: Lawn bowls
- Club: Selangor
Medal record
Representing Malaysia
Asian Lawn Bowls Championship
Gold medal – first place	2023 Kuala Lumpur	fours

Muhammad Haiqal Azami (born 1999) is a lawn bowler from Malaysia.

== Bowls career ==
Azami who bowls out of Selangor, first represented the Malaysian National team in 2017 and won the national men's doubles gold in 2018, with Haiqal Roslan.

In 2022, he won the mixed doubles title with Nurshafila Omar, at the 20th Malaysian Games.

In 2023, Azami won the gold medal at the Asian Lawn Bowls Championship, in the fours. His performances led to him being selected again by the national team, to represent them at the sport's blue riband event, the 2023 World Bowls Championship. He participated in the men's triples and the men's fours events. In the triples, his team reached the quarter final before losing to Ireland.
