= James Pirret =

Lawn Bowling player from New Zealand (1915-1976)

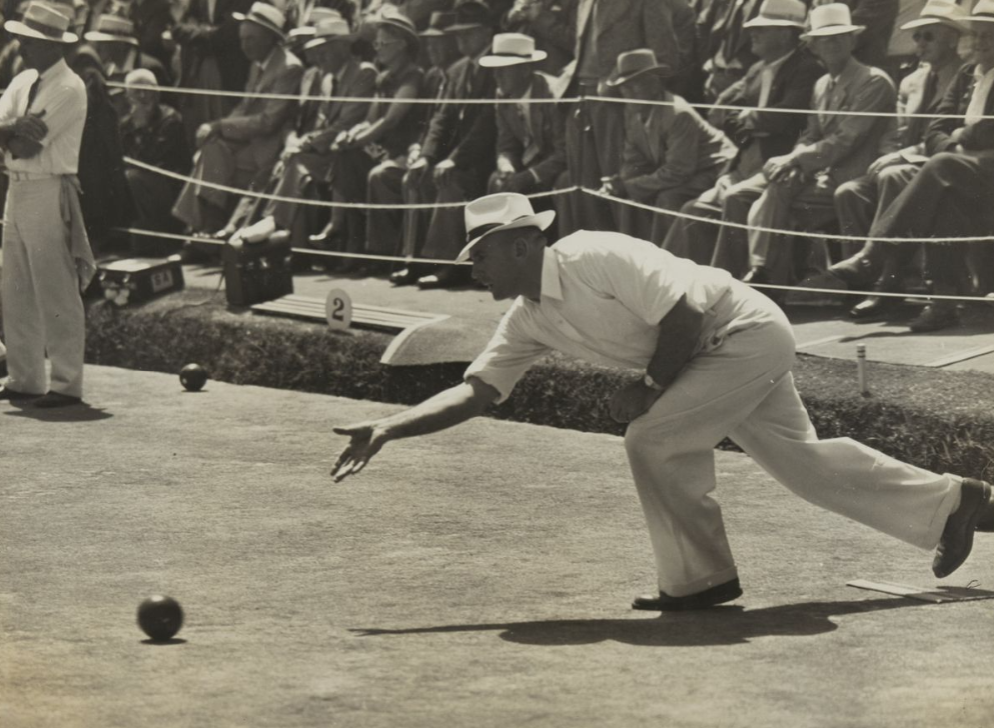
- 1950 British Empire Games at the Carlton Bowling Club, Pirret during the singles Auckland Libraries Heritage Collections

Personal information
- Born: 22 February 1915
- Died: 4 December 1976 (aged 61)

Sport
- Country: New Zealand
- Sport: Lawn bowls
- Club: Tuakau Bowling Club

Achievements and titles
- National finals: Men's singles champion (1957); Men's pairs champion (1958)
Medal record
Men's lawn bowls
Representing New Zealand
Commonwealth Games
Gold medal – first place	1950 Auckland	Singles
Silver medal – second place	1954 Vancouver	Singles

James "Ham" Pirret (22 February 1915 – 4 December 1976) was a New Zealand lawn bowls player.

At the 1950 British Empire Games in Auckland he won the men's singles gold medal. In 1954 at the next British Empire and Commonwealth Games in Vancouver he won the silver medal in the men's singles. Pirret competed in the men's singles at his third consecutive British Empire and Commonwealth Games in 1958 at Cardiff, finishing in sixth place.

Pirret won two New Zealand National Bowls Championships titles representing the Tuakau Bowling Club: the men's singles in 1957; and the men's pairs (as skip), with C. J. Rogers, in 1958.

Pirret died on 4 December 1976, and his ashes were buried at Tuakau Cemetery.
