= Bill Brault =

American lawn bowler

Personal information
- Nationality: American
- Born: United States

Sport
- Sport: Lawn bowls
- Club: San Diego LBC

Achievements and titles
- Highest world ranking: 37 (August 2026)
Medal record
Representing United States
National Championships
Gold medal – first place	2008	pairs
Gold medal – first place	2013	singles
Gold medal – first place	2015	singles
Gold medal – first place	2016	pairs
Gold medal – first place	2017	pairs

Bill Brault is an international lawn bowler from the United States. He is a five times national champion of the United States. He reached a career high ranking of world number 37 in August 2026.

== Bowls career ==
Brault came to prominence after winning the United States national championship pairs in 2008. He was later selected to represent the United States at the sport's blue riband event, the 2012 World Outdoor Bowls Championship in Adelaide, Australia, where he competed in the triples and fours events.

After winning the national singles in 2015, he represented the United States at the World Singles Champion of Champions and the 2015 Asia Pacific Bowls Championships in New Zealand.

After missing out on selection for the 2020 World Outdoor Bowls Championship, which was cancelled following the COVID-19 pandemic, he returned to the US team to represent them at 2023 World Bowls Championship. He participated in the men's triples and the men's fours events. In the triples, his team reached the quarter final before losing to eventual winners Australia.
