= Johan Jacobs (bowls) =

Namibian international lawn bowler

Personal information
- Nationality: Naimibian
Medal record
Representing (Namibia)
Atlantic Bowls Championships
Bronze medal – third place	2019 Cardiff	triples

Johan Jacobs is a Namibian international lawn bowler.

== Bowls career ==
Jacobs won a triples bronze medal (with Piet Appollis and Willem Esterhuizen), at the 2019 Atlantic Bowls Championships.

Jacobs was selected as part of the five man team by Namibia for the sport's blue riband event, the 2020 World Outdoor Bowls Championship but the event was cancelled due to the COVID-19 pandemic.

In 2023, he was selected as part of the team to represent Namibia at the 2023 World Outdoor Bowls Championship. He participated in the men's triples and the men's fours events.
