= David Baldwin (bowls) =

New Zealand lawn bowls competitor (1921–2012)

Personal information
- Full name: David Charles Baldwin
- Born: 14 December 1921 Auckland, New Zealand
- Died: 7 July 2012 (aged 90) New Plymouth, New Zealand
- Occupation: Civil engineer

Sport
- Country: New Zealand
- Sport: Lawn bowls
- Club: Paritutu Bowling Club

Achievements and titles
- National finals: Pairs champion (1971); Fours champion (1972, 1974)
Medal record
Representing New Zealand
Men's lawn bowls
Commonwealth Games
Gold medal – first place	1974 Christchurch	Fours
Silver medal – second place	1978 Edmonton	Fours

David Charles Baldwin (14 December 1921 – 7 July 2012) was a New Zealand lawn bowls player.

== Personal life ==
Born in Auckland on 14 December 1921, Baldwin was the son of Jessie and Charles Baldwin. He was educated at New Plymouth Boys' High School and worked for 43 years at the New Plymouth City Council as a civil engineer. In his youth, he excelled in numerous sports including cricket, tennis, table tennis and soccer.

== Bowls career ==
At the 1974 British Commonwealth Games, Baldwin won the men's fours gold medal partnering Kerry Clark, Gordon Jolly and John Somerville. Four years later, at the 1978 Commonwealth Games, he won the silver medal again in the men's fours.

Baldwin won three New Zealand National Bowls Championships titles when bowling for the Paritutu Bowling Club: the pairs in 1971 with John Murtagh, the fours in 1972 with Murtagh, Bruce John and Ken Tompkins, and the fours again in 1974 with Murtagh, Bruce Ballinger and Ken Murtagh. Baldwin won 16 Taranaki bowls titles.

Baldwin remained a casual participant until just a few months before he died on 7 July 2012 in New Plymouth.

== Awards ==
Baldwin won the overall award in the Taranaki Sports Awards in 1974 and as part of a bowls team in 1990. In 2013, he was an inaugural inductee into the Bowls New Zealand Hall of Fame. In 2018, he was inducted into the Taranaki Sports Hall of Fame.
