= Greg Davis (bowls) =

Jersey bowls player

Gregory Davis
Personal information
- Nationality: British (Jersey)
- Born: 23 November 1988 (age 37) Saint Helier, Jersey

Sport
- Sport: Lawn bowls
- Club: Sun BC
Medal record
Representing Jersey
Atlantic Bowls Championships
Gold medal – first place	2015 Paphos	fours
Silver medal – second place	2019 Cardiff	fours
British Isles Championships
Gold medal – first place	2016	fours
European Championships
Silver medal – second place	2024 Ayr	pairs

Greg Davis is an international lawn bowler from Jersey.

== Bowls career ==
Davis represented Jersey at the 2014 Commonwealth Games.

In 2015 he won the fours gold medal at the Atlantic Bowls Championships. and four years later won a silver medal in the same event at the Atlantic Championships.

Davis has won a British title, winning the fours in 2016 at the British Isles Bowls Championships. In 2020, he was selected for the 2020 World Outdoor Bowls Championship in Australia

In October 2021, he was selected to represent Jersey in the 2022 Commonwealth Games being held in Birmingham. He duly competed in the men's triples and the men's fours at the Games.

In 2023, he was selected as part of the team to represent Jersey at the 2023 World Outdoor Bowls Championship. He participated in the men's triples and the men's fours events. In 2024, he won a silver medal in the pairs at the 2024 European Bowls Championships.
