= Victor Siphali =

South African lawn bowler

Personal information
- Nationality: South African
- Born: 23 November 1983 (age 42) South Africa

Sport
- Sport: Lawn & indoor bowls
- Club: Bryanston Sports
Medal record
Representing South Africa
African States Tournament
Gold medal – first place	2023	triples
Silver medal – second place	2023	pairs

Victor Siphali (born 2 June 1983) is a South African international lawn and indoor bowler.

== Bowls career ==
Siphali came to prominence after being named the Johannesburg Bowls Association Player of the Year.

He was selected by the South African national team to represent them at the African States Tournament in June 2023, in Namaibia, where he won the gold medal in the fours and a silver medal in the pairs.

In August 2023, Siphali was selected by the national team again, to represent them at the sport's blue riband event, the 2023 World Bowls Championship. He participated in the men's triples and the men's fours events.
