= Aaron Zangl =

American lawn bowler

Personal information
- Born: 1975 (age 50–51) United States

Sport
- Sport: Lawn bowls
- Club: Central Division/ Milwaukee Lake Park
Medal record
Representing United States
National Championships
Gold medal – first place	2011	pairs

Aaron Zangl (born 1975) is an international lawn bowler from the United States. He is a former national champion of the United States.

== Bowls career ==
Zangl came to prominence after winning the United States national championship pairs in 2011. He was later selected to represent the United States at the sport's blue riband event, the 2012 World Outdoor Bowls Championship in Adelaide, Australia, where he competed in the pairs and fours events.

He was selected again for the United States team to compete in pairs and fours, at the 2016 World Outdoor Bowls Championship.

After missing out on selection for the 2020 World Outdoor Bowls Championship, which was cancelled following the COVID-19 pandemic, he returned to the US team to represent them for a third World Championships, at the 2023 World Bowls Championship. He participated in the men's triples and the men's fours events. In the triples, his team reached the quarter final before losing to eventual winners Australia.
