= Loren Dion =

American lawn bowler

Personal information
- Nationality: American
- Born: 1980 (age 45–46) United States

Sport
- Sport: Lawn bowls
- Club: SW/ Cambria LBC
Medal record
Representing United States
Asia Pacific Bowls Championships
Bronze medal – third place	2011	triples
Hong Kong International Bowls Classic
Bronze medal – third place	2009	singles

Loren Dion (born 1980) is an international lawn bowler from the United States.

== Bowls career ==
Dion came to prominence in 2009, after becoming the first player from the United States to win a medal at the prestigious Hong Kong International Bowls Classic.

He then secured a major championships international bronze medal (as part of the triples team that included Steve Nelson and Ian Ho) at the 2011 Asia Pacific Bowls Championships.

The following year, he was selected to represent the United States at the sport's blue riband event, the 2012 World Outdoor Bowls Championship in Adelaide, Australia, where he competed in the triples and fours events.

After missing out on selection for the 2016 World Championships, he returned to the US team to represent them at the 2020 World Outdoor Bowls Championship but the event was cancelled, following the COVID-19 pandemic.

At the 2022 World Indoor Bowls Championship Dion lost in the singles to Nick Brett, the world number 2 at the time, and then contracted COVID-19 and had to pull out of the pairs event.

He represented the US team at the 2023 World Bowls Championship. He will participate in the men's triples and the men's fours events. In the triples, his team reached the quarter final before losing to eventual winners Australia.
