= Angela Boyd =

New Zealand lawn bowler

Personal information
- Nationality: New Zealander
- Born: 10 October 1986 (age 39)

Sport
- Sport: Lawn bowls
- Club: Burnside Bowling Club, Christchurch
Medal record
World Outdoor Championships
Bronze medal – third place	2016 Christchurch	Fours
Silver medal – second place	2016 Christchurch	Pairs
Bronze medal – third place	2016 Christchurch	Team
Asia Pacific Bowls Championships
Bronze medal – third place	2015 Christchurch	triples
Bronze medal – third place	2015 Christchurch	fours

Angela Boyd (born 10 October 1986) is a New Zealand international lawn bowler.

== Bowls career ==
Angela's sister Mandy Boyd is also an international bowler.

She won two medals at the 2015 Asia Pacific Bowls Championships in Christchurch.

Boyd has won four national titles. In 2016, she won a bronze medal in the fours at the 2016 World Outdoor Bowls Championship in Christchurch with Katelyn Inch, Val Smith and Kirsten Edwards and a silver medal with Jo Edwards in the pairs.

In addition to her international success she has won the 2015 & 2016 pairs titles with her sister and five 'fours' titles (2011, 2016, 2018, 2019, 2021) at the New Zealand National Bowls Championships when bowling for the Burnside Bowls Club.
