= Lance Pascoe =

New Zealand lawn bowler

Sport
- Country: New Zealand
- Sport: Lawn bowls
- Club: Elmwood Park BC

Achievements and titles
- National finals: Men's pairs champion (2021, 2025)
- Highest world ranking: 43 (July 2025)
Medal record
Men's bowls
Representing New Zealand
World Outdoor Championships
Bronze medal – third place	2023 Gold Coast	Fours

Lance Ronald Pascoe is a New Zealand international lawn bowler. He reached a career high ranking of world number 43 in July 2025.

== Career ==
Pascoe won the gold medal in the pairs at the 2021 New Zealand National Bowls Championships, bowling with Jamie Hill. He was then awarded the New Zealand bowler of the year award.

In 2022, Pascoe was named as a reserve for the 2022 Commonwealth Games.

In 2023, he was selected as part of the team to represent New Zealand at the 2023 World Outdoor Bowls Championship. He participated in the men's triples and the men's fours events. In the fours partnering Tony Grantham, Chris Le Lievre and Sheldon Bagrie-Howley, the team won their group before securing a bronze medal, losing to Scotland in the semi final.

Pascoe won a second national pairs title with Jamie Hill in 2025.
