= Danny O'Connor (bowls) =

New Zealand international lawn bowls player

Personal information
- Nationality: New Zealand
- Died: 27 April 2017

Sport
- Club: Okahu Bay BC; Birkenhead BC
Medal record
Representing New Zealand
Commonwealth Games
Silver medal – second place	1982 Brisbane	men's fours

Danny O'Connor (died 27 April 2017) was a New Zealand international lawn bowls player.

== Bowls career ==
He won a silver medal in the men's fours at the 1982 Commonwealth Games in Brisbane with Rowan Brassey, Morgan Moffat and Jim Scott.

He won ten New Zealand National Bowls Championships titles; the 1975, 1979, 1981, 1982, 1990, 1995, 2005 & 2014 fours, the 1982 pairs and the 1983 singles.

He died on 27 April 2017.
