= Sheldon Bagrie-Howley =

New Zealand lawn bowler

Personal information
- Nationality: New Zealander
- Born: 13 February 1995 (age 31)

Sport
- Sport: Lawn bowls
- Club: Gore BC

Achievements and titles
- Highest world ranking: 6 (October 2024)
Medal record
Men's bowls
Representing New Zealand
World Outdoor Championships
Bronze medal – third place	2023 Gold Coast	fours
Hong Kong International Bowls Classic
Silver medal – second place	2023	pairs
National Championships
Gold medal – first place	2023	singles

Sheldon Bagrie-Howley (born 13 February 1995) is a New Zealand international lawn bowler. He reached a career high ranking of world number 6 in October 2024.

== Career ==
Bagrie-Howley, a New Zealand international, was part of the 2022 Commonwealth Games team.

Bagrie-Howley won the gold medal in the singles at the 2023 New Zealand National Bowls Championships.

In 2023, he was selected as part of the team to represent New Zealand at the 2023 World Outdoor Bowls Championship. He participated in the men's triples and the men's fours events. In the fours partnering Tony Grantham, Chris Le Lievre and Lance Pascoe, the team won their group before securing a bronze medal, losing to Scotland in the semi final.

In November 2023, Bagrie-Howley secured a silver medal in the pairs, at the Hong Kong International Bowls Classic.
