= Kirsten Edwards =

New Zealand international lawn bowler

Personal information
- Nationality: New Zealander
- Born: 18 March 1991 (age 35)

Sport
- Sport: Lawn bowls
- Club: United, Nelson
Medal record
World Outdoor Championships
Bronze medal – third place	2016 Christchurch	Fours
Bronze medal – third place	2016 Christchurch	Team
Asia Pacific Bowls Championships
Gold medal – first place	2019 Gold Coast	fours
Bronze medal – third place	2019 Gold Coast	pairs

Kirsten Edwards née Griffin (born 1991) is a New Zealand international lawn bowler.

== Bowls career ==
Edwards won the bronze medal in the fours at the 2016 World Outdoor Bowls Championship in Christchurch with Angela Boyd, Val Smith and Katelyn Inch.

=== Asia Pacific ===
Edwards won two medals at the 2019 Asia Pacific Bowls Championships in the Gold Coast, Queensland.

=== National ===
Edwards has won four national titles at the New Zealand National Bowls Championships, all in the fours (2016, 2017, 2019, 2021) when bowling for the United and Stoke Bowls Clubs respectively. Her mother Leigh Griffin was also part of the four during the title wins.
