= Kerry Clark =

New Zealand lawn bowls player and administrator

Kerry Clark CNZM OBE
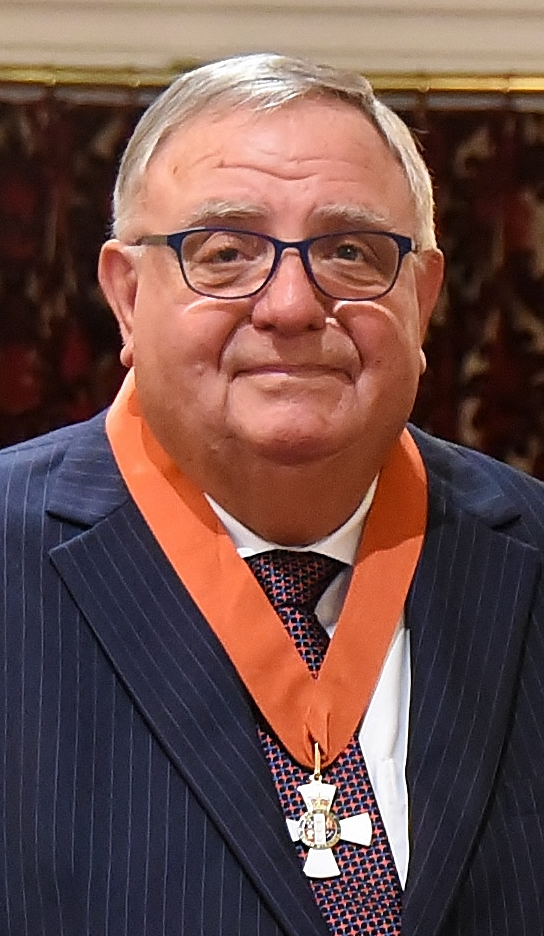
- Clark in 2017

Personal information
- Born: Peter Kerry Clark; 30 June 1949 (age 76) Cromwell, New Zealand

Sport
- Country: New Zealand
- Sport: Lawn bowls
Medal record
Men's lawn bowls
Representing New Zealand
British Commonwealth Games
| Gold medal – first place | 1974 Christchurch | Fours |

Peter Kerry Clark CNZM OBE (born 30 June 1949) is a New Zealand lawn bowls player and administrator.

== Early life and family ==
Born in Cromwell on 30 June 1949, Clark was educated at Cromwell District High School from 1961 to 1965. He married his wife, Suzanne, in 1990, and the couple have one child.

== Playing career ==
Clark began playing bowls in Cromwell as a 12-year-old, and represented New Zealand at the 1972 world championships. At the 1974 British Commonwealth Games he won the men's fours gold medal, partnering David Baldwin, Gordon Jolly and John Somerville. At the following 1978 Commonwealth Games he came fourth in the men's singles. He made his final international appearance for New Zealand in 1980.

== Administration ==
Between 1982 and 1986, Clark was the convenor of the national men's selection panel, and was involved in the organisation of the 1988 World Outdoor Bowls Championship in Auckland. He served as president of the International Bowling Board for two years. When the New Zealand men's and women's bowls associations amalgamated to form Bowls New Zealand in 1996, Clark was appointed as that body's inaugural chief executive. He announced his retirement in 2016.

Clark became chair of the World Bowls laws committee in 2004, and also chaired the organisation of the 2008 World Outdoor Bowls Championship held in Christchurch. He was chair of the New Zealand Sports Turf Institute between 1997 and 2011, and was the World Bowls technical delegate for the 2014 Commonwealth Games in Glasgow. Clark also Chaired the organisation of the 2016 World Outdoor Championships in Christchurch.

A trustee of the Halberg Disability Foundation since 1996, Clark was made a life trustee in 2016.

== Honours and awards ==
In the 1989 Queen's Birthday Honours, Clark was appointed an Officer of the Order of the British Empire, for services to bowls. In 2013, he was an inaugural inductee into the Bowls New Zealand Hall of Fame. Clark was appointed a Companion of the New Zealand Order of Merit for services to bowls in the 2017 Queen's Birthday Honours. In 2018, Clark was awarded the Commonwealth Games Federation Order of Merit.
