= Amy McIlroy =

New Zealand bowls player (born 1991)

Personal information
- Nationality: New Zealand
- Born: Amy Brenton; 22 March 1991 (age 35) Nelson, New Zealand

Sport
- Country: New Zealand
- Sport: Lawn bowls
- Events: Triples; Fours
Medal record
Lawn bowls
Representing New Zealand
Commonwealth Games
Bronze medal – third place	2014 Glasgow	Women's fours
- Updated on 28 July 2014

Amy McIlroy (née Brenton, born 22 March 1991) is a New Zealand lawn bowls player. She competed at the 2014 Commonwealth Games as part of the women's triples and women's fours teams. She won a bronze medal in the women's fours events along with teammates Mandy Boyd, Selina Goddard and Val Smith.

Born Amy Brenton, McIlroy attended Nelson's Nayland College. She married fellow lawn bowls player Shannon McIlroy in January 2013.
