= Nick Unkovich =

International lawn bowler

Personal information
- Born: Nikola Unkovich; 15 January 1923 Korčula, Kingdom of Serbs, Croats and Slovenes (present-day Croatia)
- Died: 21 July 2005 (aged 82) Auckland, New Zealand
- Spouse: Joy Auld (m. 1951)

Sport
- Country: New Zealand
- Sport: Lawn bowls
- Club: Matamata Bowling Club; Okahu Bay Bowling Club; Rawhiti Bowling Club
Medal record
Representing New Zealand
Men's lawn bowls
World Outdoor Championships
| Bronze medal – third place | 1980 Melbourne | triples |

Nikola Unkovich (15 January 1923 – 21 July 2005), generally known as Nick Unkovich, was a New Zealand international lawn bowler.

== Early life and family ==
Unkovich was born in 1923 on the island of Korčula in present-day Croatia, and migrated to New Zealand with his parents in 1932, settling in Northland. In 1951, he married Joy Auld in Auckland, and the couple went on to have two children.

== Bowls career ==
Unkovich started bowling at the Matamata Bowling Club, after moving to nearly Waharoa to establish a grocery business. He played for the Okahu Bay Bowling Club in Auckland from the mid 1970s, and then the Rawhiti Club in Remuera in later years.

He won a bronze medal in the triples at the 1980 World Outdoor Bowls Championship in Melbourne.

He won ten New Zealand National Bowls Championships titles, one singles (1979), one pairs (1991) with Ross Haresnape and eight fours titles between 1971 and 1986.
