= Gary Lawson (bowls) =

New Zealand bowler (born 1965)

Personal information
- Nationality: New Zealander
- Born: 19 October 1965 (age 60)

Sport
- Sport: Lawn bowls
- Club: Elmwood Park BC
Medal record
Representing New Zealand
World Outdoor Championships
Bronze medal – third place	1996 Adelaide	Men's fours
Silver medal – second place	2004 Ayr	Men's triples
Silver medal – second place	2004 Ayr	Men's team
Gold medal – first place	2008 Christchurch	Men's pairs
Gold medal – first place	2008 Christchurch	Men's fours
Gold medal – first place	2008 Christchurch	Men's team
Asia Pacific Bowls Championships
Bronze medal – third place	1989 Suva	triples
Silver medal – second place	1993 Victoria	singles
Gold medal – first place	1995 Dunedin	pairs
Gold medal – first place	1995 Dunedin	fours
Gold medal – first place	2003 Brisbane	triples
Silver medal – second place	2003 Brisbane	fours
Gold medal – first place	2005 Melbourne	triples
Silver medal – second place	2009 Kuala Lumpur	pairs
Gold medal – first place	2019 Gold Coast	pairs
Silver medal – second place	2019 Gold Coast	fours

Gary Raymond Lawson (born 19 October 1965) is a New Zealand international lawn bowler and a record 14 times New Zealand champion.

== Bowls career ==
=== World Championships ===
In 1996 he won the lawn bowls fours bronze medal at the 1996 World Outdoor Bowls Championship in Adelaide. He won a silver medal in the triples eight years later at the 2004 World Outdoor Bowls Championship. In 2008 he struck double gold winning both the pairs and fours at the 2008 World Outdoor Bowls Championship in Christchurch.

In 2020 he was selected for the 2020 World Outdoor Bowls Championship in Australia.

=== Commonwealth Games ===
Lawson has also appeared twice for New Zealand at the Commonwealth Games.

=== Asia Pacific ===
Lawson has won ten medals at the Asia Pacific Bowls Championships, a bronze in 1989, silver in 1993, double gold in 1995 in the pairs with Rowan Brassey and in the fours, a gold and silver in 2003, a gold in 2005, a silver in 2009 and his ninth and tenth medals was a pairs gold with Shannon McIlroy and a fours silver at the 2019 Asia Pacific Bowls Championships in the Gold Coast, Queensland.

=== National ===
He won a record 16 titles at the New Zealand National Bowls Championships bowling for various clubs. The wins were in the singles (1989, 1994); pairs (1997, 2008, 2010, 2016/17, 2017/18, 2023, 2024) and fours (1993, 1994, 1996, 1997, 2004, 2017/18, 2020). He also won the Australian Open Pairs championship with Ryan Bester in 2008.
