= Sandra Keith (bowls) =

New Zealand lawn bowler

Personal information
- Born: Sandra Margaret Keith; 1968 (age 57–58)

Sport
- Country: New Zealand
- Sport: Lawn bowls
- Club: Leeston Bowling Club

Achievements and titles
- National finals: Singles champion (2012); Pairs champion (2013, 2022); Fours champion (2020)
Medal record
Women's lawn bowls
Representing New Zealand
World Singles Champion of Champions
Gold medal – first place	2012 Cyprus	Singles
Asia Pacific Bowls Championships
Bronze medal – third place	2015 Christchurch	Triples
Bronze medal – third place	2015 Christchurch	Fours

Sandra Margaret Keith (born 1968) is a New Zealand women's international lawn bowler.

== Bowls career ==
Keith is a four times National champion, winning the New Zealand National Bowls Championships singles in 2012, pairs in 2013 and 2022 and fours in 2020.

The 2012 national singles win qualified her to play in the World Singles Champion of Champions in Paphos, Cyprus, where she won the gold medal after defeating Jane Rigby in the final.

She has also won two bronze medals at the Asia Pacific Bowls Championships.
